= K League All-Star Game =

- Organiser(s): Korea Football Association (1991–1992); K League Federation (1995–present)
- Founded: 1991; 35 years ago
- Region: South Korea
- Broadcaster: Coupang Play

The K League All-Star Game is an annual association football exhibition match organised by the South Korean K League. The inaugural match was held in 1991.

== Blue vs White ==
Allocation of clubs
Year	1991	1992
Blue	Yukong Elephant; Lucky-Goldstar Hwangso; Daewoo Royals	Yukong Elephant; LG Cheetahs; Ilhwa Chunma
White	POSCO Atoms; Hyundai Horang-i; Ilhwa Chunma	POSCO Atoms; Hyundai Horang-i; Daewoo Royals

=== 1991 ===
10 November 1991
UTC+9 15:00

Blue	3–1	White
Lee Young-jin 9'; Noh Soo-jin 35'; Ha Seok-ju 64'	Report	Kim Hyun-seok 27'

Dongdaemun Stadium, Seoul
Attendance: 10,000
Referee: Choi Gil-soo

GK	(South Korea) Cha Sang-kwang
DF	(South Korea) Chung Yong-hwan
DF	(South Korea) Choi Yun-kyum	Substituted off
DF	(South Korea) Gu Sang-bum
DF	(South Korea) Park Hyun-yong
DF	(South Korea) Kim Pan-keun
MF	(South Korea) Choi Jin-han
MF	(South Korea) Lee Young-jin	Substituted off
MF	(South Korea) Noh Soo-jin	Substituted off
FW	(South Korea) Hwangbo Kwan	Substituted off
FW	(South Korea) Kim Joo-sung
Substitutes:
DF	(South Korea) Park Jung-bae	Substituted on
MF	(South Korea) Kim Jun-hyun	Substituted on
MF	(South Korea) Cho Min-kook	Substituted on
FW	(South Korea) Ha Seok-ju	Substituted on
Manager:
(South Korea) Kim Jung-nam

GK	(South Korea) Choi In-young
DF	(South Korea) Choi Kang-hee
DF	(South Korea) Gong Moon-bae
DF	(South Korea) Chung Jong-son
MF	(South Korea) Yoon Sung-hyo
MF	(South Korea) Lee Sang-yoon	Substituted off
MF	(South Korea) Oh Dong-cheon
MF	(South Korea) Kim Hyun-seok	Substituted off
FW	(South Korea) Shin Hong-gi
FW	(South Korea) Choi Soon-ho	Substituted off
FW	(South Korea) Ko Jeong-woon
Substitutes:
DF	(South Korea) Cho Woo-seok	Substituted on
MF	(South Korea) Kim Sang-ho
FW	(South Korea) Kim I-joo	Substituted on
FW	(South Korea) Lee Kee-keun	Substituted on
Manager:
(South Korea) Park Jong-hwan

Most Valuable Player:
(South Korea) Lee Young-jin

Assistant referees:
(South Korea) Kil Ki-chul
(South Korea) Park Hee-charang
Fourth official:
(South Korea) Kim Young-joo

=== 1992 ===
22 July 1992
UTC+9 18:00

Blue	0–2	White
	Report	Kim Hyun-seok 81', 85'

Dongdaemun Stadium, Seoul
Attendance: 8,051
Referee: Choi Chang-seon

GK	(Tajikistan) Valeri Sarychev
DF	(South Korea) Ha Sung-joon
DF	(South Korea) Park Jung-bae
DF	(South Korea) Choi Young-jun
DF	(South Korea) Gu Bon-seok	Substituted off
MF	(South Korea) Lee Sang-yoon	Substituted off
MF	(South Korea) Lee Young-jin
MF	(South Korea) Choi Dae-shik
MF	(South Korea) Noh Soo-jin	Substituted off
FW	(South Korea) Hwangbo Kwan	Substituted off
FW	(South Korea) Ko Jeong-woon
Substitutes:
GK	(South Korea) Lee Moon-young
DF	(South Korea) Lee Jong-hwa	Substituted on
DF	(South Korea) Shin Dong-chul
MF	(South Korea) Oh Dong-cheon	Substituted on
MF	(South Korea) Choi Yun-kyum
FW	(South Korea) Yoon Sang-chul	Substituted on
FW	(South Korea) Lim Keun-jae	Substituted on
Manager:
(South Korea) Ko Jae-wook

GK	(South Korea) Choi In-young
DF	(South Korea) Choi Kang-hee
DF	(South Korea) Chung Jong-soo
DF	(South Korea) Chung Jong-son
DF	(South Korea) Hong Myung-bo
MF	(South Korea) Park Tae-ha
MF	(South Korea) Ahn Sung-il	Substituted off
MF	(South Korea) Park Hyun-yong
FW	(South Korea) Park Chang-hyun
FW	(South Korea) Kim Jung-hyuk	Substituted off
FW	(South Korea) Noh Kyung-hwan	Substituted off
Substitutes:
GK	(South Korea) Cha Sang-kwang
DF	(South Korea) Kim Pan-keun	Substituted on
DF	(South Korea) Nam Ki-young
DF	(South Korea) Yoon Sung-hyo
DF	(South Korea) Chung Yong-hwan
MF	(South Korea) Shin Hong-gi	Substituted on
FW	(South Korea) Kim Hyun-seok	Substituted on
Manager:
(South Korea) Cha Bum-kun

Most Valuable Player:
(South Korea) Kim Hyun-seok

Assistant referees:
(South Korea) Lee Sang-yong
(South Korea) Kim Gwang-jong
Fourth official:
(South Korea) Seo Geun-man

== Koreans vs foreigners ==
Blue Dragon team consisted of native Korean players, and White Tiger team consisted of foreign players.

=== 1995 ===
7 August 1995
UTC+9 15:00

Blue Dragon	1–0	White Tiger
Roh Sang-rae 87'	Report

Busan Gudeok Stadium, Busan
Attendance: 25,000
Referee: Lee Sang-yong

GK	(South Korea) Kim Byung-ji	Substituted off
DF	(South Korea) Kang Chul	Substituted off
DF	(South Korea) Kim Pan-keun	Substituted off
DF	(South Korea) Yoo Sang-chul
DF	(South Korea) Lee Young-sang
MF	(South Korea) Choi Young-il
MF	(South Korea) Hong Myung-bo
MF	(South Korea) Ko Jeong-woon
MF	(South Korea) Ha Seok-ju	Substituted off
FW	(South Korea) Hwang Sun-hong	Substituted off
FW	(South Korea) Kim Joo-sung	Substituted off
Substitutes:
GK	(South Korea) Shin Bum-chul	Substituted on
MF	(South Korea) Lee Young-jin	Substituted on
MF	(South Korea) Choi Dae-shik	Substituted on
MF	(South Korea) Shin Tae-yong	Substituted on
FW	(South Korea) Roh Sang-rae	Substituted on
FW	(South Korea) Song Ju-seok	Substituted on
Manager:
(South Korea) Huh Jung-moo

GK	(Tajikistan) Valeri Sarychev
DF	(Ukraine) Andriy Sidelnikov
DF	(Federal Republic of Yugoslavia) Jovan Šarčević
DF	(Brazil) Silvan Lopes
DF	(South Korea) Gu Sang-bum
MF	(Russia) Gennadi Styopushkin	Substituted off
MF	(Bosnia and Herzegovina) Amir Teljigović
MF	(South Korea) Hwangbo Kwan	Substituted off
FW	(Federal Republic of Yugoslavia) Rade Bogdanović
FW	(Federal Republic of Yugoslavia) Saša Drakulić	Substituted off
FW	(South Korea) Kim Bong-gil (Note: Selected for the All-Star Team to replace Seo Jung-won, originally selected.)	Substituted off
Substitutes:
GK	(Russia) Aleksandr Podshivalov	Substituted on
DF	(Federal Republic of Yugoslavia) Goran Jevtić	Substituted on
MF	(Federal Republic of Yugoslavia) Boro Janičić
MF	(Hungary) József Somogyi	Substituted on
MF	(South Korea) Han Jung-kook	Substituted on
MF	(Federal Republic of Yugoslavia) Boško Minić	Substituted on
Manager:
(Russia) Valery Nepomnyashchy

Most Valuable Player:
(South Korea) Roh Sang-rae

Assistant referees:
(South Korea) Min Byung-keuk
(South Korea) Kim Young-joo
Fourth official:
(South Korea) Kang Byung-ho

=== 1997 ===
30 November 1997
UTC+9 14:00

Blue Dragon	2–1	White Tiger
Kim Do-hoon 47'; Kim Jung-hyuk 50'	Report	Manić 43'

Gwang-Yang Stadium, Gwangyang
Attendance: 25,000
Referee: Seo Geun-man

GK	(South Korea) Kim Byung-ji
DF	(South Korea) Chung Jong-son
DF	(South Korea) Ha Seok-ju
DF	(South Korea) Kim Tae-young
DF	(South Korea) Yoo Sang-chul
MF	(South Korea) Kim Gi-dong	Substituted off
MF	(South Korea) Lee Ki-hyung	Substituted off
MF	(South Korea) Seo Jung-won
MF	(South Korea) Kim Hyun-seok	Substituted off
FW	(South Korea) Park Kun-ha	Substituted off
FW	(South Korea) Kim Do-hoon
Substitutes:
GK	(South Korea) Kim Bong-soo
DF	(South Korea) Kim Joo-sung
DF	(South Korea) Lee Min-sung
DF	(South Korea) Kim Jung-hyuk	Substituted on
MF	(South Korea) Jang Chul-woo	Substituted on
MF	(South Korea) Lee Sang-yoon	Substituted on
FW	(South Korea) Roh Sang-rae	Substituted on
Manager:
(South Korea) Ko Jae-wook

GK	(Tajikistan) Valeri Sarychev	Substituted off
DF	(Russia) Boris Vostrosablin
DF	(Brazil) Maciel	Substituted off
DF	(Romania) Cosmin Olăroiu
DF	(Zaire) Mutamba Kabongo
MF	(Croatia) Dževad Turković	Substituted off
MF	(Romania) Pavel Badea
MF	(North Macedonia) Žanko Savov	Substituted off
FW	(Federal Republic of Yugoslavia) Radivoje Manić	Substituted off
FW	(Romania) Constantin Barbu	Substituted off
FW	(Federal Republic of Yugoslavia) Saša Drakulić	Substituted off
Substitutes:
GK	(Russia) Aleksei Prudnikov	Substituted on
MF	(Ghana) Stanley Aborah	Substituted on
MF	(Russia) Oleg Elyshev	Substituted on
MF	(Russia) Denis Laktionov	Substituted on
FW	(Cameroon) Michel Pensée	Substituted on
FW	(Ukraine) Vitaliy Parakhnevych	Substituted on
FW	(Ukraine) Serhiy Skachenko	Substituted on
Manager:
(Russia) Valery Nepomnyashchy

Most Valuable Player:
(South Korea) Kim Jung-hyuk

Assistant referees:
(South Korea) Kwak Kyung-man
(South Korea) Kang Sung-choo
Fourth official:
(South Korea) Lee Jae-sung

== Central vs South ==
Allocation of clubs
Central	Anyang LG Cheetahs, FC Seoul; Bucheon SK; Cheonan Ilhwa Chunma, Seongnam Ilhwa Chunma; Daejeon Citizen; Incheon United; Suwon Samsung Bluewings; Daegu FC (2006–2007); Jeonbuk Hyundai Motors (2006–2007)
South	Busan Daewoo Royals, Busan I'Cons, Busan IPark; Gwangju Sangmu; Gyeongnam FC; Jeju United; Jeonnam Dragons; Pohang Steelers; Ulsan Hyundai Horang-i; Daegu FC (2003–2005); Jeonbuk Hyundai Dinos, Jeonbuk Hyundai Motors (2000–2005)

=== 1998 ===
16 August 1998
UTC+9 17:00

Central	2–6	South
Ko Jong-soo 16' (pen.); Lee Sang-yoon 35'	Report	Ahn Jung-hwan 28'; Yoo Sang-chul 30'; Park Tae-ha 55'; Park Sung-bae 56'; Lee Dong-gook 69' (pen.) 78'

Jamsil Stadium, Seoul
Attendance: 61,840
Referee: Kim Gwang-jong

GK	(South Korea) Kim Bong-soo
DF	(South Korea) Kang Chul
DF	(South Korea) Jang Dae-il
DF	(South Korea) Kim Kyung-bum
DF	(South Korea) Lee Lim-saeng
MF	(South Korea) Ko Jong-soo	Substituted off
MF	(Russia) Oleg Elyshev	Substituted off
MF	(South Korea) Yoon Jung-hwan
MF	(South Korea) Lee Gi-bum	Substituted off
FW	(South Korea) Lee Sang-yoon	Substituted off
FW	(South Korea) Choi Yong-soo
Substitutes:
GK	(South Korea) Lee Woon-jae
DF	(Democratic Republic of the Congo) Mutamba Kabongo
DF	(South Korea) Lee Ki-hyung
DF	(South Korea) Seo Dong-won	Substituted on
MF	(South Korea) Shin Jin-won	Substituted on
MF	(Russia) Denis Laktionov
FW	(South Korea) Kim Eun-jung	Substituted on
Manager:
(South Korea) Kim Ho

GK	(South Korea) Kim Byung-ji	Substituted off
DF	(South Korea) Kim Joo-sung
DF	(South Korea) Lee Min-sung	Substituted off
DF	(South Korea) Yoo Sang-chul	Substituted off
DF	(South Korea) Kim Jung-hyuk
MF	(Brazil) Maciel
MF	(South Korea) Kim Hyun-seok	Substituted off
MF	(South Korea) Kim Do-keun	Substituted off
FW	(South Korea) Jung Jae-kwon	Substituted off
FW	(South Korea) Ahn Jung-hwan	Substituted off
FW	(South Korea) Lee Dong-gook	Substituted off
Substitutes:
GK	(South Korea) Shin Bum-chul	Substituted on
MF	(South Korea) Kim Tae-young	Substituted on
MF	(South Korea) Lee Kyung-chun	Substituted on
MF	(South Korea) Park Tae-ha	Substituted on
FW	(Iraq) Abbas Obeid Jassim	Substituted on
FW	(Croatia) Dževad Turković	Substituted on
FW	(South Korea) Park Sung-bae	Substituted on
Manager:
(South Korea) Lee Cha-man

Most Valuable Player:
(South Korea) Lee Dong-gook

Assistant referees:
(South Korea) Kwon Jong-chul
(South Korea) Kim Tae-young
Fourth official:
(South Korea) Han Byung-hwa

=== 1999 ===
15 August 1999
UTC+9 18:00

Central	7–3	South
Choi Yong-soo 10' (pen.); Drakulić 16'; Kim Eun-jung 52' (pen.); Gwak Kyung-keun 55', 75'; Jung Kwang-min 63'; Seo Dong-won 70'	Report	Maciel 31', 86'; Roh Sang-rae 89'

Jamsil Stadium, Seoul
Attendance: 65,872
Referee: Lim Eun-joo

GK	(South Korea) Lee Woon-jae	Substituted off
DF	(South Korea) Shin Hong-gi	Substituted off
DF	(Democratic Republic of the Congo) Mutamba Kabongo
DF	(South Korea) Kang Chul
DF	(South Korea) Lee Lim-saeng
MF	(South Korea) Park Nam-yeol
MF	(South Korea) Ko Jong-soo	Substituted off
MF	(South Korea) Seo Jung-won	Substituted off
FW	(South Korea) Kim Jin-woo	Substituted off
FW	(Federal Republic of Yugoslavia) Saša Drakulić	Substituted off
FW	(South Korea) Choi Yong-soo	Substituted off
Substitutes:
GK	(South Korea) Kwon Chan-soo	Substituted on
MF	(South Korea) Lee Ki-hyung	Substituted on
MF	(South Korea) Jung Kwang-min	Substituted on
MF	(South Korea) Seo Dong-won	Substituted on
FW	(South Korea) Gwak Kyung-keun	Substituted on
FW	(South Korea) Kim Eun-jung	Substituted on
FW	(Russia) Sergey Burdin	Substituted on
Manager:
(South Korea) Kim Ho

GK	(South Korea) Kim Byung-ji	Substituted off
DF	(South Korea) Kim Sang-hoon	Substituted off
DF	(South Korea) Choi Dong-ho
DF	(Brazil) Maciel
DF	(South Korea) Kim Tae-young
MF	(South Korea) Ko Jeong-woon	Substituted off
MF	(South Korea) Seo Hyuk-su
MF	(South Korea) Park Sung-bae	Substituted off
FW	(South Korea) Kim Hyun-seok	Substituted off
FW	(South Korea) Lee Dong-gook	Substituted off
FW	(South Korea) Ahn Jung-hwan	Substituted off
Substitutes:
GK	(South Korea) Lee Kwang-suk	Substituted on
DF	(South Korea) Kim Hyun-soo	Substituted on
MF	(Federal Republic of Yugoslavia) Radivoje Manić	Substituted on
MF	(South Korea) Kim Do-keun	Substituted on
FW	(South Korea) Kim Jong-kun	Substituted on
FW	(South Korea) Park Tae-ha	Substituted on
FW	(South Korea) Roh Sang-rae	Substituted on
Manager:
(South Korea) Ko Jae-wook

Most Valuable Player:
(South Korea) Gwak Kyung-keun

Assistant referees:
(South Korea) Kim Jin-ohk
(South Korea) Min Bae-sik
Fourth official:
(South Korea) Cha Deok-hwan

=== 2000 ===
15 August 2000
UTC+9 18:00

Central	2–3	South
Lee Yong-bal 46' (pen.); Park Nam-yeol 53'	Report	Lee Dong-gook 3'; Lee Young-pyo 21' (o.g.); Choi Moon-sik 39'

Jamsil Stadium, Seoul
Attendance: 48,986
Referee: Lee Sang-yong

GK	(South Korea) Shin Eui-son	(substituted off) 45'
DF	(South Korea) Seo Dong-won	(substituted off) 45'
DF	(South Korea) Kang Chul
DF	(South Korea) Lee Lim-saeng
DF	(South Korea) Shin Hong-gi
DF	(South Korea) Kim Young-chul	(substituted off) 45'
MF	(South Korea) Lee Young-pyo
MF	(South Korea) Ko Jong-soo
FW	(South Korea) Park Kang-jo	(substituted off) 45'
FW	(South Korea) Park Nam-yeol	(substituted off) 65'
FW	(South Korea) Choi Yong-soo
Substitutes:
GK	(South Korea) Lee Yong-bal	(substituted on) 45'
MF	(South Korea) Shin Jin-won	(substituted on) 45'
MF	(Russia) Denis Laktionov	(substituted on) 45'
MF	(Brazil) André Gaspar	(substituted on) 45'
FW	(South Korea) Jang Chul-woo	(substituted on) 65'
Manager:
(South Korea) Cho Yoon-hwan

GK	(South Korea) Kim Byung-ji	(substituted off) 45'
DF	(South Korea) Park Min-seo	(substituted off) 55'
DF	(Croatia) Jasenko Sabitović
DF	(Brazil) Maciel	(substituted off) 45'
DF	(South Korea) Kim Tae-young
MF	(South Korea) Kim Do-kyun
MF	(South Korea) Park Tae-ha
MF	(South Korea) Yang Hyun-jung
MF	(South Korea) Choi Moon-sik	(substituted off) 61'
FW	(South Korea) Lee Dong-gook	(substituted off) 61'
FW	(South Korea) Kim Do-hoon
Substitutes:
GK	(South Korea) Seo Dong-myung	(substituted on) 45'
DF	(South Korea) Kim Sang-hoon	(substituted on) 45'
DF	(South Korea) Lee Gi-boo	(substituted on) 55'
MF	(South Korea) Kim Nam-il	(substituted on) 61'
FW	(Federal Republic of Yugoslavia) Radivoje Manić	(substituted on) 61'
Manager:
(South Korea) Lee Hoe-taik

Most Valuable Player:
(South Korea) Kim Byung-ji

Assistant referees:
(South Korea) Lee Sam-ho
(South Korea) Kim Kye-soo
Fourth official:
(South Korea) Kim Yong-chul

=== 2001 ===
5 August 2001
UTC+9 19:00

Central	1–2	South
Sandro 65'	Report	Lee Dong-gook 3', 30'

Suwon World Cup Stadium, Suwon
Attendance: 31,978
Referee: Son Jong-deok

GK	(South Korea) Shin Eui-son	Substituted off
DF	(South Korea) Lee Young-pyo
DF	(South Korea) Cho Sung-hwan
DF	(South Korea) Kim Young-keun
DF	(South Korea) Kim Hyun-soo
MF	(South Korea) Lee Eul-yong
MF	(South Korea) Choi Tae-uk
MF	(South Korea) Park Nam-yeol	Substituted off
FW	(South Korea) Sung Han-soo	Substituted off
FW	(Federal Republic of Yugoslavia) Saša Drakulić	Substituted off
FW	(South Korea) Kim Eun-jung	Substituted off
Substitutes:
GK	(South Korea) Lee Yong-bal	(substituted on) 45'
MF	(South Korea) Ko Jong-soo	(substituted on) 45'
MF	(Russia) Denis Laktionov	(substituted on) 52'
MF	(Brazil) Sandro Cardoso	(substituted on) 52'
MF	(South Korea) Seo Jung-won	(substituted on) 35'
Manager:
(South Korea) Kim Ho

GK	(South Korea) Kim Byung-ji
DF	(South Korea) Ha Seok-ju	Substituted off
DF	(South Korea) Song Chong-gug
DF	(Brazil) Maciel
DF	(South Korea) Lee Min-sung
MF	(South Korea) Kim Nam-il
MF	(Colombia) Harry Castillo	Substituted off
MF	(South Korea) Yang Hyun-jung	Substituted off
MF	(South Korea) Kim Hyun-seok	Substituted off
FW	(South Korea) Lee Dong-gook
FW	(South Korea) Kim Do-hoon	Substituted off
Substitutes:
GK	(South Korea) Seo Dong-myung	(substituted on) 84'
DF	(South Korea) Jang Dae-il	(substituted on) 63'
MF	(South Korea) Kim Do-kyun	(substituted on) 45'
MF	(South Korea) Ko Jeong-woon	(substituted on) 35'	(substituted off) 45'
FW	(Brazil) Paulinho	(substituted on) 54'
FW	(Brazil) Cezinha	(substituted on) 54'
Manager:
(South Korea) Kim Ho-gon

Most Valuable Player:
(South Korea) Lee Dong-gook

Assistant referees:
(South Korea) Kim Sun-jin
(South Korea) Kim Hwa-soo
Fourth official:
(South Korea) Kim Hoi-sung

=== 2002 ===
15 August 2002
UTC+9 19:00

Central	6–1	South
Drakulić 49', 59', 65', 86'; Dabo 72'; Shin Tae-yong 87'	Report	Lee Dong-gook 61'

Seoul World Cup Stadium, Seoul
Attendance: 65,860
Referee: Kwon Jong-chul

GK	(South Korea) Shin Eui-son
DF	(South Korea) Lee Young-pyo
DF	(South Korea) Lee Lim-saeng	Substituted off
DF	(South Korea) Lee Ki-hyung
DF	(South Korea) Kim Sang-sik	Substituted off
MF	(South Korea) Ko Jong-soo	Substituted off
MF	(South Korea) Lee Kwan-woo
MF	(South Korea) Shin Tae-yong
MF	(Brazil) André Gaspar	Substituted off
FW	(South Korea) Choi Tae-uk	Substituted off
FW	(South Korea) Kim Eun-jung	Substituted off
Substitutes:
GK	(South Korea) Lee Woon-jae
DF	(South Korea) Kim Jung-soo	(substituted on) 45'
DF	(South Korea) Kim Young-chul	(substituted on) 45'
MF	(South Korea) Nam Ki-il	(substituted on) 45'
MF	(South Korea) Choi Sung-yong	(substituted on) 45'
FW	(Mali) Cheick Oumar Dabo	(substituted on) 45'
FW	(Federal Republic of Yugoslavia) Saša Drakulić	(substituted on) 45'
Manager:
(South Korea) Cha Kyung-bok

GK	(South Korea) Kim Byung-ji	Substituted off
DF	(South Korea) Hong Myung-bo	Substituted off
DF	(South Korea) Kim Tae-young	Substituted off
DF	(South Korea) Park Dong-hyuk
DF	(South Korea) Choi Jin-cheul	Substituted off
MF	(South Korea) Kim Nam-il	Substituted off
MF	(Colombia) Harry Castillo
MF	(South Korea) Hyun Young-min	Substituted off
MF	(South Korea) Park Jin-sub
FW	(South Korea) Lee Dong-gook
FW	(South Korea) Lee Chun-soo
Substitutes:
GK	(South Korea) Lee Yong-bal	(substituted on) 45'
DF	(Brazil) Maciel	(substituted on) 45'
DF	(South Korea) Lee Min-sung	(substituted on) 45'
MF	(South Korea) Song Chong-gug	(substituted on) 65'
MF	(South Korea) Ha Seok-ju	(substituted on) 45'
FW	(Federal Republic of Yugoslavia) Radivoje Manić
FW	(South Korea) Kim Do-hoon	(substituted on) 45'
Manager:
(South Korea) Kim Jung-nam

Most Valuable Player:
(Federal Republic of Yugoslavia) Saša Drakulić

Assistant referees:
(South Korea) Yoo Young-tae
(South Korea) Ahn Sang-ki
Fourth official:
(South Korea) Park Jong-kyu

=== 2003 ===
15 August 2003
UTC+9 19:00

Central	1–4	South
Dabo 82'	Report	Lee Dong-gook 18'; Edmilson 70'; Dodô 80'; Kim Hyun-seok 85'

Seoul World Cup Stadium, Seoul
Attendance: 55,874
Referee: Kim Jin-ok

GK	(South Korea) Lee Woon-jae	Substituted off
DF	(South Korea) Cho Byung-kuk
DF	(Croatia) Jasenko Sabitović	Substituted off
DF	(South Korea) Lee Ki-hyung	Substituted off
MF	(South Korea) Lee Eul-yong
MF	(South Korea) Choi Tae-uk
MF	(South Korea) Lee Kwan-woo
MF	(South Korea) Shin Tae-yong
MF	(South Korea) Seo Jung-won	Substituted off
FW	(South Korea) Jung Jo-gook	Substituted off
FW	(South Korea) Kim Eun-jung	Substituted off
Substitutes:
GK	(South Korea) Choi Eun-sung	(substituted on) 46'
DF	(South Korea) Wang Jung-hyun
DF	(South Korea) Nam Ki-il	(substituted on) 46'
MF	(Romania) Gabriel Popescu	(substituted on) 46'
FW	(South Korea) Kim Do-hoon	(substituted on) 46'
FW	(Mali) Cheick Oumar Dabo	(substituted on) 46'
FW	(South Korea) Lee Won-shik	(substituted on) 46'
Manager:
(South Korea) Cha Kyung-bok

GK	(South Korea) Kim Byung-ji	Substituted off
DF	(South Korea) Lee Min-sung	Substituted off
DF	(South Korea) Kim Tae-young	Substituted off
DF	(South Korea) Park Jin-sub
DF	(South Korea) Choi Jin-cheul	Substituted off
MF	(South Korea) Noh Jung-yoon	Substituted off
MF	(South Korea) Hyun Young-min
MF	(South Korea) Kim Do-keun	Substituted off
MF	(South Korea) Kim Nam-il
FW	(South Korea) Lee Dong-gook
FW	(South Korea) Choi Sung-kuk	Substituted off
Substitutes:
GK	(South Korea) Kim Yong-dae	(substituted on) 62'
DF	(Brazil) Rogério Pinheiro	(substituted on) 46'
DF	(South Korea) Park Dong-hyuk	(substituted on) 46'
MF	(South Korea) Kim Gi-dong	(substituted on) 70'
MF	(South Korea) Kim Hyun-seok	(substituted on) 58'
MF	(South Korea) Kim Hak-chul	(substituted on) 54'
FW	(Brazil) Dodô	(substituted on) 46'
FW	(Portugal) Edmilson	(substituted on) 46'
Manager:
(South Korea) Kim Jung-nam

Most Valuable Player:
(South Korea) Lee Dong-gook

Assistant referees:
(South Korea) Kim Sun-jin
(South Korea) Won Chang-ho
Fourth official:
(South Korea) Han Byung-hwa

=== 2004 ===
4 July 2004
UTC+9 18:00

Central	4–2	South
Nádson 20'; Kim Eun-jung 28', 34'; Kim Do-hoon 71'	Report	Cooke 59', 75'

Daejeon World Cup Stadium, Daejeon
Attendance: 19,638
Referee: Lee Sang-yong

GK	(South Korea) Lee Woon-jae	(substituted off) 45(1)'
DF	(South Korea) Kim Hyun-soo	(substituted off) 45(2)'
DF	(Croatia) Jasenko Sabitović
DF	(South Korea) Lee Ki-hyung
DF	(South Korea) Kim Jung-soo
MF	(South Korea) Kim Do-heon
MF	(South Korea) Lee Kwan-woo	(substituted off) 59'
MF	(South Korea) Shin Tae-yong	(substituted off) 45(3)'
MF	(South Korea) Lee Eul-yong
FW	(Brazil) Nádson	(substituted off) 45(4)'
FW	(South Korea) Kim Eun-jung
Substitutes:
GK	(South Korea) Choi Eun-sung	(substituted on) 45(1)'
DF	(South Korea) Cho Byung-kuk	(substituted on) 45(2)'
DF	(South Korea) Kim Chi-gon	(substituted on) 59'
MF	(South Korea) Choi Tae-uk	(substituted on) 45(3)'
MF	(South Korea) Kim Dong-jin
FW	(Mali) Cheick Oumar Dabo
FW	(South Korea) Kim Do-hoon	(substituted on) 45(4)'
Manager:
(South Korea) Cho Kwang-rae

GK	(South Korea) Kim Byung-ji	(substituted off) 58'
DF	(Brazil) Rogério Pinheiro
DF	(South Korea) Hyun Young-min
DF	(South Korea) Park Jin-sub	(substituted off) 45(1)'
DF	(South Korea) Lee Min-sung	(substituted off) 45(2)'
MF	(South Korea) Yoon Ju-il	(substituted off) 45(3)'
MF	(South Korea) Kim Sang-rok
MF	(South Korea) Yoon Jung-hwan	(substituted off) 79(1)'
MF	(South Korea) Kim Tae-young	(substituted off) 79(2)'
FW	(South Korea) Lee Dong-gook
FW	(South Korea) Choi Sung-kuk
Substitutes:
GK	(South Korea) Kim Young-kwang	(substituted on) 45(3)'
DF	(South Korea) Choi Jin-cheul	(substituted on) 45(2)'
DF	(South Korea) Kim Tae-young
MF	(South Korea) Kim Nam-il	(substituted on) 79(2)'
MF	(South Korea) Noh Jung-yoon	(substituted on) 79(1)'
FW	(Brazil) Jefferson Feijão	(substituted on) 58'
FW	(England) Andy Cooke	(substituted on) 45(1)'
Manager:
(South Korea) Choi Soon-ho

Most Valuable Player:
(South Korea) Kim Eun-jung

Assistant referees:
(South Korea) Kwak Kyung-man
(South Korea) Kang Dae-yeon
Fourth official:
(South Korea) Choi Doo-yeol

=== 2005 ===
21 August 2005
UTC+9 18:00

Central	2–3	South
Park Chu-young 13' (pen.); Gong O-kyun 65'	Report	Rogério Pinheiro 19'; Lee Dong-gook 38'; Sandro 87'

Seoul World Cup Stadium, Seoul
Attendance: 32,784
Referee: Park Jong-kyu

GK	(South Korea) Lee Woon-jae	Substituted off
DF	(South Korea) Park Jin-sub	Substituted off
DF	(South Korea) Choi Sung-yong
DF	(South Korea) Kim Han-yoon
DF	(Croatia) Mato Neretljak
MF	(South Korea) Baek Ji-hoon
MF	(South Korea) Lee Kwan-woo	Substituted off
MF	(South Korea) Cho Yong-hyung
FW	(South Korea) Park Chu-young
FW	(South Korea) Kim Do-hoon	Substituted off
FW	(South Korea) Kim Eun-jung	Substituted off
Substitutes:
GK	(South Korea) Choi Eun-sung	(substituted on) 45'
DF	(South Korea) Chun Jae-ho	(substituted on) 45'
MF	(South Korea) Kim Do-heon
MF	(South Korea) Kim Dae-eui
MF	(South Korea) Kim Dong-jin	(substituted on) 45'
FW	(South Korea) Gong O-kyun	(substituted on) 45'
FW	(South Korea) Bang Seung-hwan	(substituted on) 45'
Manager:
(South Korea) Cha Bum-kun

GK	(South Korea) Kim Byung-ji	Substituted off
DF	(Brazil) Rogério Pinheiro
DF	(South Korea) Choi Jin-cheul	Substituted off
DF	(South Korea) Yoon Jung-hwan	Substituted off
DF	(South Korea) Kim Jung-woo	Substituted off
MF	(South Korea) Yoo Sang-chul	Substituted off
MF	(South Korea) Lee Jung-hyo
MF	(South Korea) Lee Jang-kwan	Substituted off
MF	(South Korea) Chung Kyung-ho	Substituted off
FW	(Brazil) Sandro Hiroshi
FW	(South Korea) Lee Dong-gook
Substitutes:
GK	(South Korea) Kim Young-kwang	(substituted on) 45'
DF	(South Korea) Yoo Kyoung-youl	(substituted on) 45'
DF	(South Korea) Park Dong-hyuk	(substituted on) 45'
MF	(South Korea) Ko Jong-soo	(substituted on) 71'
MF	(South Korea) Kim Sang-rok	(substituted on) 45'
MF	(South Korea) Hong Soon-hak	(substituted on) 59'
FW	(Romania) Adrian Neaga	(substituted on) 45'
Manager:
(South Korea) Huh Jung-moo

Most Valuable Player:
(South Korea) Park Chu-young

Assistant referees:
(South Korea) Kim Sun-jin
(South Korea) Kim Hyun-goo
Fourth official:
(South Korea) Lee Sang-yong

=== 2006 ===
20 August 2006
UTC+9 18:00

Central	10–6	South
Lee Kwan-woo 19'; Park Chu-young 32', 79'; Kim Eun-jung 33'; Radončić 51', 68', 84', 86', 88' (pen.); Botti 64'	Report	Choi Sung-kuk 3', 49', 70', 89'; An Yong-hak 8'; Lee Chun-soo 37'

Incheon World Cup Stadium, Incheon
Attendance: 33,562
Referee: Lee Sam-ho

GK	1	(South Korea) Lee Woon-jae	(substituted off) 45'
DF	4	(South Korea) Choi Jin-cheul	(substituted off) 45'
DF	8	(South Korea) Song Chong-gug	(substituted off) 45'
DF	15	(South Korea) Cho Byung-kuk
DF	23	(South Korea) Cho Won-hee
MF	5	(South Korea) Kim Nam-il	(substituted off) 45'
MF	7	(South Korea) Baek Ji-hoon	(substituted off) 45'
MF	13	(South Korea) Lee Kwan-woo	(substituted off) 45'
MF	14	(South Korea) Kim Do-heon
FW	10	(South Korea) Park Chu-young
FW	18	(South Korea) Kim Eun-jung	(substituted off) 45'
Substitutes:
GK	77	(South Korea) Kim Byung-ji	(substituted on) 45'
DF	20	(South Korea) Kim Young-chul	(substituted on) 45'
DF	21	(South Korea) Kim Chi-woo	(substituted on) 45'
MF	30	(South Korea) Oh Jang-eun	(substituted on) 45'
FW	12	(South Korea) Bae Ki-jong	(substituted on) 45'
FW	16	(Brazil) Raphael Botti (Note: Selected for the All-Star Team to replace Kim Hyeung-bum, originally selected.)	(substituted on) 45'
FW	31	(Montenegro) Dženan Radončić	(substituted on) 45'
Manager:
(South Korea) Cha Bum-kun

GK	21	(South Korea) Kim Young-kwang	(substituted off) 45'
DF	3	(Brazil) Rogério Pinheiro
DF	5	(South Korea) Yoo Kyoung-youl	(substituted off) 45'
DF	6	(South Korea) Park Dong-hyuk
DF	14	(South Korea) Oh Beom-seok	(substituted off) 45'
MF	9	(South Korea) Kim Yong-hee
MF	12	(Brazil) Andrezinho	(substituted off) 45'
MF	17	(North Korea) An Yong-hak	(substituted off) 56'
FW	10	(South Korea) Lee Chun-soo
FW	16	(South Korea) Chung Kyung-ho	(substituted off) 45'
FW	18	(South Korea) Choi Sung-kuk
Substitutes:
GK	24	(South Korea) Cho Jun-ho	(substituted on) 45'
DF	4	(South Korea) Cho Sung-hwan	(substituted on) 45'
DF	7	(South Korea) Lee Gang-jin
DF	15	(South Korea) Cho Yong-hyung	(substituted on) 45'
MF	13	(South Korea) Kim Hyo-il	(substituted on) 56'
FW	8	(Brazil) Popó	(substituted on) 45'
FW	11	(South Korea) Kim Jin-yong	(substituted on) 45'
Manager:
(South Korea) Huh Jung-moo

Most Valuable Player:
(Montenegro) Dženan Radončić

Assistant referees:
(South Korea) Ahn Sang-ki
(South Korea) Kim Dae-young
Fourth official:
(South Korea) Ko Geum-bok

=== 2007 ===
4 August 2007
UTC+9 16:40

Central	5–2	South
Damjanović 18'; Denilson 48', 67', 77'; Park Chu-young 87'	Report	Namgung Do 34'; Popó 86'

Seoul World Cup Stadium, Seoul
Attendance: 25,832
Referee: Kwon Jong-chul

Central	South

GK	1	(South Korea) Kim Byung-ji	Substituted off
DF	4	(South Korea) Choi Jin-cheul
DF	8	(South Korea) Song Chong-gug
DF	15	(South Korea) Jang Hak-young
DF	23	(South Korea) Kim Chi-gon	Substituted off
MF	5	(South Korea) Kim Do-heon	Substituted off
MF	7	(South Korea) Choi Chul-soon
MF	13	(Brazil) Mota	Substituted off
MF	14	(South Korea) Lee Kwan-woo	Substituted off
FW	10	(South Korea) Lee Keun-ho
FW	18	(Montenegro) Dejan Damjanović	Substituted off
Substitutes:
GK	77	(South Korea) Lee Woon-jae	(substituted on) 45'
DF	16	(South Korea) Cho Byung-kuk	(substituted on) 80'
MF	20	(South Korea) Kim Sang-rok	(substituted on) 45'
MF	21	(South Korea) Kim Nam-il	(substituted on) 87'
FW	12	(South Korea) Yeom Ki-hun
FW	30	(South Korea) Park Chu-young	(substituted on) 87'
FW	31	(Brazil) Denilson	(substituted on) 45'
Manager:
(South Korea) Cha Bum-kun

GK	21	(South Korea) Kim Young-kwang	Substituted off
DF	3	(Brazil) Rogério Pinheiro	Substituted off
DF	5	(South Korea) Kim Jin-kyu	Substituted off
DF	6	(South Korea) Lee Gang-jin
DF	9	(North Korea) An Yong-hak
MF	12	(South Korea) Hwang Jin-sung
MF	14	(South Korea) Kim Gi-dong	Substituted off
MF	17	(South Korea) Oh Jang-eun
MF	18	(South Korea) Kim Chi-woo
FW	10	(Brazil) Popó
FW	16	(South Korea) Namgung Do	Substituted off
Substitutes:
GK	24	(South Korea) Park Dong-suk	(substituted on) 45'
DF	4	(South Korea) Oh Beom-seok
DF	7	(South Korea) Lee Yo-han	(substituted on) 45'
MF	8	(South Korea) Kim Hyo-il	(substituted on) 49'
FW	11	(South Korea) Woo Sung-yong	(substituted on) 45'
FW	13	(South Korea) Chun Jae-woon	(substituted on) 45'
FW	15	(South Korea) Lee Chun-soo
Manager:
(South Korea) Park Hang-seo

Most Valuable Player:
(Brazil) Denilson

Assistant referees:
(South Korea) Kim Hwa-soo
(South Korea) Kim Sun-jin
Fourth official:
(South Korea) Lee Sang-yong

== Other rivalries ==
=== 2013 ===
21 June 2013
19:00 UTC+9

Team Classic	3–3	Team Challenge
Lee Dong-gook 23' (pen.); Damjanović 26'; Jong Tae-se 70+1'	Report	Yeom Ki-hun 28'; Koo Ja-cheol 63'; Wesley Alex 65'

Seoul World Cup Stadium, Seoul

Team Classic	Team Challenge

GK	1	(South Korea) Kim Byung-ji
DF	22	(South Korea) Cha Du-ri
DF	21	(South Korea) Yun Young-sun
DF	29	(South Korea) Kwak Hee-ju
DF	7	(Brazil) Adilson
MF	12	(Serbia) Miloš Bosančić
MF	6	(South Korea) Lee Myung-joo
MF	4	(South Korea) Park Jong-woo
MF	11	(South Korea) Lim Sang-hyub
FW	10	(Montenegro) Dejan Damjanović
FW	20	(South Korea) Lee Dong-gook
Substitutes:
GK		(South Korea) Jung Sung-ryong
DF		(South Korea) Hong Chul
DF		(South Korea) Lee Woong-hee
DF		(South Korea) Yoo Kyoung-youl
MF		(South Korea) Kim Nam-il
MF		(South Korea) Lee Chun-soo
MF		(Brazil) Eninho
MF		(South Korea) Song Jin-hyung
FW		(South Korea) Kim Shin-wook
FW		(North Korea) Jong Tae-se
FW		(Romania) Ianis Zicu
Manager:
(South Korea) Choi Yong-soo

GK	21	(South Korea) Yoo Hyun
DF	25	(South Korea) Choi Chul-soon
DF	20	(South Korea) Lim Ha-ram
DF	32	(South Korea) Kim Hyung-il
DF	3	(South Korea) Yang Sang-min
MF	11	(South Korea) Lee Keun-ho
MF	8	(South Korea) Lee Ho
MF	7	(South Korea) Kim Jae-sung
FW	26	(South Korea) Yeom Ki-hun
FW	9	(South Korea) Kim Young-hoo
FW	10	(South Korea) Jung Jo-gook
Substitutes:
GK		(South Korea) Kim Deok-soo
DF		(South Korea) Oh Beom-seok
DF		(South Korea) Son Guk-hoe
DF		(South Korea) Lee Sang-woo
MF		(Brazil) Wesley Alex
MF		(South Korea) Yoo Soo-hyun
FW		(South Korea) Lim Chang-gyoon
DF		(South Korea) Yoon Suk-young (invited player)
MF		(South Korea) Koo Ja-cheol (invited player)
MF		(South Korea) Ki Sung-yueng (invited player)
MF		(South Korea) Lee Chung-yong (invited player)
Manager:
(South Korea) Cho Dong-hyun

Most Valuable Player:
(South Korea) Koo Ja-cheol

Match rules

- 70 minutes (35 minutes each half)

=== 2015 ===
17 July 2015
19:30 UTC+9

Team Choi Kang-hee	3–3	Team Stielike
Leonardo 27'; Joo Min-kyu 50'; Kim Ho-nam 53'	Report	Yeom Ki-hun 11'; Hwang Ui-jo 48'; Lee Jong-ho 61'

Ansan Wa~ Stadium, Ansan
Attendance: 24,772

GK	(South Korea) Kim Byung-ji
DF	(South Korea) Cha Du-ri
DF	(Croatia) Matej Jonjić
DF	(Spain) Osmar
DF	(South Korea) Hong Chul
MF	(South Korea) Kim Seung-dae
MF	(South Korea) Yoon Bit-garam
MF	(South Korea) Shin Hyung-min
MF	(South Korea) Kim Do-heon
MF	(Brazil) Leonardo
FW	(South Korea) Lee Dong-gook
Substitutes:
DF	(South Korea) Choi Hyo-jin	Substituted on
DF	(South Korea) Yun Young-sun	Substituted on
MF	(South Korea) Hwang Ji-woong	Substituted on
MF	(South Korea) Son Jun-ho	Substituted on
MF	(South Korea) Kim Ho-nam	Substituted on
FW	(South Korea) Joo Min-kyu	Substituted on
Manager:
(South Korea) Choi Kang-hee

GK	(South Korea) Kwoun Sun-tae
DF	(South Korea) Rim Chang-woo
DF	(South Korea) Kim Hyung-il
DF	(South Korea) Lee Kyung-ryul
DF	(South Korea) Choi Chul-soon
MF	(South Korea) Go Yo-han
MF	(South Korea) Ju Se-jong
MF	(South Korea) Kwon Chang-hoon
MF	(South Korea) Yeom Ki-hun
FW	(South Korea) Lee Jong-ho
FW	(South Korea) Kim Shin-wook
Substitutes:
GK	(South Korea) Jung Sung-ryong	Substituted on
DF	(South Korea) Jeong Dong-ho	Substituted on
DF	(South Korea) Jung Seung-hyun	Substituted on
MF	(South Korea) Jo Soo-chul	Substituted on
FW	(South Korea) Hwang Ui-jo	Substituted on
FW	(South Korea) Lee Jeong-hyeop	Substituted on
Manager:
(Germany) Uli Stielike

Most Valuable Player:
(South Korea) Yeom Ki-hun

Match rules

- 70 minutes (35 minutes each half)

== vs J.League (JOMO Cup) ==
=== 2008 ===
2 August 2008
UTC+9 18:00

K League All-Stars	3–1	J.League All-Stars
Choi Sung-kuk 37'; Edu 57', 60'	Report	Tulio 67'

Olympic Stadium, Tokyo
Attendance: 27,629
Referee: Mark Shield

GK	1	(South Korea) Lee Woon-jae		(substituted off) 81(1)'
CB	3	(South Korea) Kim Hyung-il
CB	5	(South Korea) Kim Chi-gon
CB	14	(South Korea) Lee Jung-soo	(yellow card) 87'
DM	6	(South Korea) Cho Won-hee
RM	2	(South Korea) Choi Hyo-jin
LM	4	(South Korea) Kim Chi-woo		(substituted off) 45(2)'
AM	19	(South Korea) Lee Kwan-woo		(substituted off) 68'
RF	7	(South Korea) Choi Sung-kuk		(substituted off) 73'
CF	10	(Montenegro) Dženan Radončić		(substituted off) 62'
LF	11	(Brazil) Dudu		(substituted off) 45(1)'
Substitutes:
GK	18	(South Korea) Kim Young-kwang		(substituted on) 81(1)'
MF	9	(South Korea) Chung Kyung-ho		(substituted on) 45(2)'
MF	16	(South Korea) Lee Dong-sik		(substituted on) 68'
FW	8	(South Korea) Jung Jo-gook		(substituted on) 62'
FW	13	(South Korea) Kim Jin-yong		(substituted on) 73'
FW	15	(Brazil) Edu		(substituted on) 45(1)'	(substituted off) 81(2)'
FW	17	(South Korea) Jang Nam-seok		(substituted on) 81(2)'
Manager:
(South Korea) Cha Bum-kun

GK	1	(Japan) Seigo Narazaki
DF	2	(Japan) Yuji Nakazawa		(substituted off) 69'
DF	4	(Japan) Marcus Tulio Tanaka	(yellow card) 85'
DF	7	(Japan) Toru Araiba
DF	15	(Japan) Yūichi Komano		(substituted off) 79'
MF	6	(South Korea) Kim Nam-il		(substituted off) 65'
MF	8	(Japan) Mitsuo Ogasawara	(yellow card) 62'	(substituted off) 75'
MF	10	(Japan) Koji Yamase		(substituted off) 60'
MF	14	(Japan) Kengo Nakamura
FW	9	(Norway) Frode Johnsen
FW	16	(North Korea) Jong Tae-se		(substituted off) 72'
Substitutes:
GK	19	(Japan) Ryōta Tsuzuki
DF	3	(Japan) Daiki Iwamasa		(substituted on) 69'
DF	13	(Japan) Yuki Abe		(substituted on) 65'
MF	5	(Japan) Yasuyuki Konno		(substituted on) 79'
MF	11	(Japan) Takahiro Futagawa		(substituted on) 75'
MF	17	(Japan) Mu Kanazaki		(substituted on) 60'
FW	18	(Japan) Seiichiro Maki		(substituted on) 72'
Manager:
(Brazil) Oswaldo de Oliveira

Most Valuable Player:
(South Korea) Choi Sung-kuk

Assistant referees:
(Japan) Yoshihisa Takahashi
(Japan) Hisashi Nakai

=== 2009 ===
8 August 2009
UTC+9 19:00

K League All-Stars	1–4	J.League All-Stars
Choi Sung-kuk 82' (pen.)	Report	Marquinhos 14'; Lee Jung-soo 59'; K. Nakamura 72'; Juninho 81'

Incheon Munhak Stadium, Incheon
Attendance: 39,230

GK	1	(South Korea) Lee Woon-jae		(substituted off) 56'
RB	4	(South Korea) Kim Chang-soo		(substituted off) 46(1)'
CB	3	(South Korea) Kim Hyung-il
CB	5	(China) Li Weifeng
LB	8	(Brazil) Adilson
CM	16	(South Korea) Ki Sung-yueng
CM	14	(South Korea) Kim Jung-woo		(substituted off) 46(2)'
RW	10	(Montenegro) Dejan Damjanović		(substituted off) 46(3)'
AM	11	(South Korea) Choi Tae-uk		(substituted off) 65'
LW	18	(South Korea) Lee Dong-gook		(substituted off) 46(4)'
CF	7	(South Korea) Choi Sung-kuk	(yellow card) 77'
Substitutes:
DF	2	(South Korea) Choi Hyo-jin	(yellow card) 86'	(substituted on) 46(1)'
MF	13	(South Korea) Lee Ho		(substituted on) 46(2)'
FW	9	(Brazil) Edu		(substituted on) 46(3)'
MF	15	(South Korea) Yoo Byung-soo		(substituted on) 46(4)'
GK	19	(South Korea) Kim Young-kwang		(substituted on) 56'
FW	17	(South Korea) Kim Young-hoo		(substituted on) 68'
Manager:
(South Korea) Cha Bum-kun

GK	1	(Japan) Seigo Narazaki	(substituted off) 75'
CB	3	(Japan) Daiki Iwamasa	(substituted off) 83'
CB	17	(Japan) Tomokazu Myojin
CB	6	(South Korea) Lee Jung-soo
RWB	2	(Japan) Atsuto Uchida	(substituted off) 46'
LWB	15	(Brazil) Gilton Ribeiro
CM	14	(Japan) Kengo Nakamura	(substituted off) 81'
CM	7	(Japan) Yasuhito Endō	(substituted off) 59'
CM	8	(Japan) Mitsuo Ogasawara	(substituted off) 67'
CF	10	(Brazil) Juninho
CF	18	(Brazil) Marquinhos	(substituted off) 63'
Substitutes:
DF	5	(Japan) Yūichi Komano	(substituted on) 46'
MF	9	(Japan) Takuya Nozawa	(substituted on) 59'
FW	11	(Japan) Yoshito Ōkubo	(substituted on) 63'
MF	13	(Japan) Yuki Abe	(substituted on) 67'
GK	19	(Japan) Hitoshi Sogahata	(substituted on) 75'
MF	16	(Japan) Hiroyuki Taniguchi	(substituted on) 81'
DF	4	(Japan) Tomoaki Makino	(substituted on) 83'
Manager:
(Brazil) Oswaldo de Oliveira

Most Valuable Player:
(South Korea) Lee Jung-soo

Assistant referees:
(South Korea) Kim Yong
(South Korea) Son Jae-sun

== Invitational games ==
=== 2010 ===
4 August 2010
UTC+9 20:00

K League All-Stars	2–5	Barcelona
Choi Sung-kuk 1'; Lee Dong-gook 35'		Ibrahimović 5'; Messi 42', 45+1'; V. Sánchez 81'; Oriol 83'

Seoul World Cup Stadium, Seoul
Attendance: 32,581
Referee: Choi Kwang-bo

K League All-Stars	Barcelona

GK	1	(South Korea) Jung Sung-ryong		(substituted off) 46(1)'
RB	19	(South Korea) Kim Chang-soo
CB	6	(South Korea) Kim Hyung-il
CB	4	(South Korea) Kim Sang-sik		(substituted off) 46(3)'
LB	2	(South Korea) Choi Hyo-jin		(substituted off) 46(2)'
CM	8	(South Korea) Kim Jae-sung		(substituted off) 46(4)'
CM	5	(South Korea) Kim Do-heon		(substituted off) 46(5)'
CM	17	(South Korea) Choi Sung-kuk		(substituted off) 46(8)'
AM	9	(Brazil) Eninho		(substituted off) 46(6)'
AM	11	(Colombia) Mauricio Molina	Yellow card	(substituted off) 46(7)'
CF	20	(South Korea) Lee Dong-gook		(substituted off) 46(9)'
Substitutes:
GK	21	(South Korea) Kim Young-kwang		(substituted on) 46(1)'
DF	15	(South Korea) Kim Chi-gon		(substituted on) 46(3)'
MF	7	(South Korea) Koo Ja-cheol		(substituted on) 46(4)'
MF	14	(South Korea) Park Hee-do		(substituted on) 46(8)'
MF	16	(South Korea) Ha Dae-sung		(substituted on) 46(5)'
MF	22	(South Korea) Woo Seung-je (Note: Selected for the All-Star Team to replace Kim Dong-jin, originally selected.)		(substituted on) 46(2)'
FW	10	(Brazil) Lucio		(substituted on) 46(6)'
FW	12	(Brazil) Índio (Note: Selected for the All-Star Team to replace Cho Yong-hyung, originally selected.)		(substituted on) 46(9)'
FW	18	(South Korea) Lee Seung-yeoul		(substituted on) 46(7)'
Manager:
(South Korea) Choi Kang-hee

GK	13	(Spain) José Manuel Pinto		(substituted off) 46(1)'
DF	16	(Spain) Ilie Sánchez		(substituted off) 29(1)'
DF	3	(Spain) Sergi Gómez		(substituted off) 46(2)'
DF	18	(Argentina) Gabriel Milito		(substituted off) 46(3)'
DF	19	(Brazil) Maxwell		(substituted off) 46(4)'
MF	4	(Mexico) Jonathan dos Santos		(substituted off) 46(5)'
MF	6	(Spain) Sergi Roberto		(substituted off) 46(6)'
MF	21	(Brazil) Adriano		(substituted off) 29(2)'
FW	17	(Spain) Eduard Oriol
FW	9	(Sweden) Zlatan Ibrahimović		(substituted off) 46(7)'
FW	27	(Spain) Benja	Yellow card
Substitutes:
GK	25	(Spain) Rubén Miño		(substituted on) 46(1)'
DF	2	(Brazil) Dani Alves		(substituted on) 29(2)' (substituted off) 46(8)'
DF	5	(Spain) Marc Muniesa		(substituted on) 46(2)'
DF	12	(Spain) Albert Dalmau		(substituted on) 46(9)'
DF	22	(France) Eric Abidal		(substituted on) 46(4)'
MF	8	(Spain) Víctor Sánchez		(substituted on) 46(6)'
MF	14	(Spain) Martí Riverola		(substituted on) 46(5)'
MF	15	(Mali) Seydou Keita		(substituted on) 46(8)'
FW	10	(Argentina) Lionel Messi		(substituted on) 29(1)' (substituted off) 46(9)'
FW	11	(Spain) Nolito		(substituted on) 46(7)'
FW	28	(Spain) Cristian Tello		(substituted on) 46(3)'
Manager:
(Spain) Pep Guardiola

Most Valuable Player:
(Argentina) Lionel Messi

Assistant referees:
Jung Hae-sang
Kim Yong-soo
Fourth official:
Kim Jong-hyuk

=== 2012 ===
This match was held to commemorate the 10th anniversary of the 2002 FIFA World Cup, which South Korea hosted.

5 July 2012
UTC+9 19:00

Team 2012	6–3	Team 2002
Eninho 14', 58'; Lee Dong-gook 17', 20', 68'; Ha Dae-sung 66'		Choi Yong-soo 25'; Park Ji-sung 30'; Hwang Sun-hong 70'

Seoul World Cup Stadium, Seoul
Attendance: 37,155
Referee: Lee Sam-ho

Team 2012	Team 2002

GK	12	(South Korea) Kim Young-kwang
DF	3	(Brazil) Adilson
DF	23	(Australia) Eddy Bosnar
DF	4	(South Korea) Yoo Kyoung-youl
DF	2	(South Korea) Choi Hyo-jin
MF	8	(Brazil) Eninho
MF	16	(South Korea) Ha Dae-sung
MF	13	(South Korea) Yoon Bit-garam
MF	9	(South Korea) Lee Seung-gi
MF	22	(South Korea) Kim Hyeung-bum
FW	20	(South Korea) Lee Dong-gook
Substitutes:
GK	1	(South Korea) Jung Sung-ryong
GK	21	(South Korea) Kim Yong-dae
DF	5	(South Korea) Kwak Tae-hwi
DF	15	(South Korea) Hong Jeong-ho
DF	17	(South Korea) Shin Kwang-hoon
DF	19	(South Korea) Jung In-whan
DF	27	(South Korea) Kim Chang-soo
MF	6	(South Korea) Lee Hyun-seung
MF	7	(South Korea) Kang Seung-jo
MF	14	(South Korea) Kim Jung-woo
FW	11	(South Korea) Lee Keun-ho
FW	18	(South Korea) Kim Eun-jung
Manager:
(South Korea) Shin Tae-yong

GK	1	(South Korea) Lee Woon-jae
DF	7	(South Korea) Kim Tae-young
DF	4	(South Korea) Choi Jin-cheul
DF	20	(South Korea) Hong Myung-bo
MF	13	(South Korea) Lee Eul-yong
MF	5	(South Korea) Kim Nam-il
MF	6	(South Korea) Yoo Sang-chul
MF	22	(South Korea) Song Chong-gug
FW	21	(South Korea) Park Ji-sung
FW	18	(South Korea) Hwang Sun-hong
FW	9	(South Korea) Seol Ki-hyeon
Substitutes:
GK	12	(South Korea) Kim Byung-ji
GK	23	(South Korea) Choi Eun-sung
DF	15	(South Korea) Lee Min-sung
MF	2	(South Korea) Hyun Young-min
MF	3	(South Korea) Choi Sung-yong
MF	8	(South Korea) Choi Tae-uk
FW	11	(South Korea) Choi Yong-soo
FW	19	(South Korea) Ahn Jung-hwan
Manager:
(Netherlands) Guus Hiddink

Most Valuable Player:
(South Korea) Lee Dong-gook

Assistant referees:
(South Korea) Kim Kye-soo
(South Korea) Kim Hyun-goo

Fourth official:
(South Korea) Song Min-seok

Match rules

- 70 minutes (35 minutes each half)
- No extra-time and penalty shootout
- No limit on substitutions (Team 2002)
- For Team 2002, be allowed re-substitutions

=== 2014 ===
25 July 2014
UTC+9 20:00

Team K League	6–6	Team Park Ji-sung
Kim Seung-gyu 26' (pen.); Yoon Bit-garam 30'; Lim Sang-hyub 46'; Lee Dong-gook 48', 67'; Lee Jong-ho 74'		Kang Soo-il 7'; Jong Tae-se 18'; Jung Jo-gook 21'; Park Ji-sung 58'; Kim Hyun 66'; Lee Chun-soo 80'

Seoul World Cup Stadium, Seoul
Referee: Ha Seok-ju (first half)
Choi Yong-soo (second half)

Team K League	Team Park Ji-sung

GK	18	(South Korea) Kim Seung-gyu
DF	2	(South Korea) Lee Yong
DF	22	(Australia) Alex Wilkinson
DF	6	(South Korea) Kim Jin-kyu
DF	17	(South Korea) Hong Chul
MF	10	(South Korea) Lee Seung-gi
MF	14	(South Korea) Yoon Bit-garam
MF	8	(South Korea) Kim Do-heon
MF	26	(South Korea) Yeom Ki-hun
MF	11	(South Korea) Lee Keun-ho
FW	9	(South Korea) Kim Shin-wook
Substitutes:
GK	1	(South Korea) Lee Bum-young
DF	5	(South Korea) Cha Du-ri
DF	16	(South Korea) Lee Yun-pyo
MF	7	(South Korea) Lim Sang-hyub
MF	19	(South Korea) Kim Tae-hwan
MF	24	(South Korea) Lee Jae-an
FW	12	(South Korea) Kim Seung-dae
FW	18	(South Korea) Lee Jong-ho
FW	20	(South Korea) Lee Dong-gook
Manager:
(South Korea) Hwang Sun-hong
Coach:
(South Korea) Seo Jung-won

GK	1	(South Korea) Kim Byung-ji
DF	16	(South Korea) Oh Beom-seok
DF	5	(Japan) Tsuneyasu Miyamoto
DF	32	(South Korea) Kim Hyung-il
DF	12	(South Korea) Lee Young-pyo
MF	19	(South Korea) Moon Chang-jin
MF	8	(South Korea) Kim Jae-sung
MF	7	(South Korea) Park Ji-sung	(yellow card) 27'
MF	11	(South Korea) Kang Soo-il
FW	9	(South Korea) Jung Jo-gook
FW	14	(North Korea) Jong Tae-se
Substitutes:
GK	23	(South Korea) Choi Eun-sung
DF	3	(South Korea) Kim Yong-hwan
DF	6	(South Korea) Park Dong-hyuk
DF	13	(South Korea) Hyun Young-min	(yellow card) 46'
DF	22	(South Korea) Kim Chi-gon
MF	10	(South Korea) Lee Chun-soo
MF	20	(South Korea) Baek Ji-hoon
FW	18	(South Korea) Kim Eun-jung
FW	27	(South Korea) Kim Hyun
Manager:
(Netherlands) Guus Hiddink
Coach:
(South Korea) Park Hang-seo
(South Korea) Jung Hae-seong

Most Valuable Player:
(South Korea) Park Ji-sung

Assistant referees:
(South Korea) Cho Min-kook / Kim Bong-gil
(South Korea) Lee Sang-yoon

Fourth official:
(South Korea) Park Kyung-hoon

Match rules

- 80 minutes (40 minutes each half)
- No extra-time and penalty shootout
- No limit on substitutions and can be allowed re-substitutions

=== 2017 ===
This game is the first all-star game to be held outside South Korea.

29 July 2017
20:03 UTC+7

K League All-Stars	0–1	Vietnam U23
	Report; Video	Nguyễn Văn Toàn 70'

Mỹ Đình National Stadium, Hanoi
Referee: Sivakorn Pu-udom

GK	1	(South Korea) Kim Yong-dae		(substituted off) 46(2)'
RB	3	(South Korea) Lee Seul-chan (Note: Selected for the All-Star Team to replace Choi Hyo-jin, originally selected.)
CB	15	(South Korea) Koo Ja-ryong		(substituted off) 46(3)'
CB	4	(South Korea) Oh Ban-suk		(substituted off) 46(1)'
LB	36	(South Korea) Kim Jin-su
RM	20	(South Korea) Han Sang-woon		(substituted off) 46(5)'
CM	7	(South Korea) Kim Do-hyuk		(substituted off) 46(4)'
CM	8	(South Korea) Son Jun-ho
LM	26	(South Korea) Yeom Ki-hun		(substituted off) 72'
SS	11	(South Korea) Lee Keun-ho		(substituted off) 59'
CF	99	(South Korea) Kim Shin-wook
Substitutes:
GK	21	(South Korea) Jo Hyeon-woo		(substituted on) 46(2)'
DF	5	(South Korea) Kwak Tae-hwi	(yellow card) 49'	(substituted on) 46(1)'
DF	14	(South Korea) Oh Beom-seok		(substituted on) 46(3)'
DF	23	(South Korea) Kim Min-hyeok		(substituted on) 46(4)'
DF	33	(South Korea) Hong Chul		(substituted on) 59'
FW	17	(South Korea) Ahn Hyeon-beom (Note: Selected for the All-Star Team to replace Hwang Il-su, originally selected.)		(substituted on) 72'
FW	18	(South Korea) Yang Dong-hyen		(substituted on) 46(5)'
Manager:
(South Korea) Hwang Sun-hong
Coaches:
(South Korea) Kim Do-hoon
(South Korea) Seo Jung-won

GK	22	(Vietnam) Phí Minh Long
CB	11	(Vietnam) Đỗ Duy Mạnh
CB	3	(Vietnam) Hoàng Văn Khánh	(substituted off) 46(3)'
CB	4	(Vietnam) Bùi Tiến Dũng
RB	17	(Vietnam) Vũ Văn Thanh	(substituted off) 84'
LB	20	(Vietnam) Đoàn Văn Hậu	(substituted off) 68'
CM	13	(Vietnam) Lâm Ti Phông	(substituted off) 46(1)'
CM	6	(Vietnam) Lương Xuân Trường
CM	12	(Vietnam) Nguyễn Phong Hồng Duy	(substituted off) 46(2)'
CF	26	(Vietnam) Hà Đức Chinh	(substituted off) 27'
CF	10	(Vietnam) Nguyễn Công Phượng	(substituted off) 64'
Substitutes:
DF	2	(Vietnam) Trần Văn Kiên	(substituted on) 84'
DF	7	(Vietnam) Trần Đình Trọng	(substituted on) 46(3)'
DF	21	(Vietnam) Đỗ Thanh Thịnh	(substituted on) 68'
MF	8	(Vietnam) Nguyễn Tuấn Anh	(substituted on) 64'
MF	19	(Vietnam) Nguyễn Quang Hải	(substituted on) 46(2)'
FW	14	(Vietnam) Lê Thanh Bình	(substituted on) 27'
FW	9	(Vietnam) Nguyễn Văn Toàn	(substituted on) 46(1)'
Manager:
(Vietnam) Nguyễn Hữu Thắng

=== 2019 ===
The friendly match against Juventus was hosted by South Korean sports agency TheFasta on 26 July 2019. The K League Federation defined that this match wasn't official All-Star Game, but they cooperated to accomplish the match. It was scheduled to kick-off at 20:00, but it was delayed for 50 minutes because Juventus players and staff arrived late at the stadium. This match caused controversy in South Korea due to Cristiano Ronaldo who disdained the contract by refusing the signing event and sitting on the bench throughout the game. Seven years after this controversy, Nanyang Technological University studied 26 countries to identify their preferences between Ronaldo and Lionel Messi, and South Korea recorded the strongest relative preference for Messi ahead of Argentina in the research.

26 July 2019
UTC+9 20:50

Team K League	3–3	Juventus
Osmar 7'; Cesinha 45'; Taggart 50'	Report	Muratore 9'; Matuidi 78'; Pereira 81'

Seoul World Cup Stadium, Seoul
Attendance: 63,000
Referee: Kim Dong-jin

Team K League	Juventus

GK	21	(South Korea) Jo Hyeon-woo		(substituted off) 46(1)'
RB	22	(South Korea) Hong Chul		(substituted off) 46(2)'
CB	4	(Cyprus) Valentinos Sielis
CB	6	(South Korea) Yun Young-sun (Note: Selected for the All-Star Team to replace Dave Bulthuis, originally selected.)		(substituted off) 46(3)'
LB	2	(South Korea) Lee Yong		(substituted off) 46(4)'
CM	5	(Spain) Osmar		(substituted off) 65'
CM	8	(South Korea) Yoon Bit-garam	(yellow card) 42'	(substituted off) 46(5)'
CM	14	(South Korea) Kim Bo-kyung		(substituted off) 46(6)'
RF	11	(Brazil) Cesinha
CF	20	(South Korea) Lee Dong-gook (c)		(substituted off) 46(7)'
LF	7	(Brazil) Éder		(substituted off) 46(8)'
Substitutes:
GK	31	(South Korea) Song Bum-keun		(substituted on) 46(1)'
MF	13	(South Korea) Kim Jin-ya		(substituted on) 46(2)'
DF	23	(South Korea) Lee Kwang-seon		(substituted on) 46(3)'
DF	33	(South Korea) Park Joo-ho		(substituted on) 46(4)'
MF	42	(United States) Mix Diskerud		(substituted on) 46(5)'
FW	10	(South Korea) Park Chu-young		(substituted on) 46(6)'
FW	18	(Australia) Adam Taggart		(substituted on) 46(7)'
FW	77	(Brazil) Wanderson		(substituted on) 46(8)'
MF	24	(South Korea) Yun Il-lok		(substituted on) 65'
Manager:
(Portugal) José Morais

GK	1	(Poland) Wojciech Szczęsny		(substituted off) 39'
RB	20	(Portugal) João Cancelo	(yellow card) 40'	(substituted off) 84'
CB	4	(Netherlands) Matthijs de Ligt
CB	24	(Italy) Daniele Rugani		(substituted off) 60(2)'
LB	37	(Italy) Pietro Beruatto		(substituted off) 65'
CM	23	(Germany) Emre Can		(substituted off) 60(3)'
CM	5	(Bosnia and Herzegovina) Miralem Pjanić		(substituted off) 60(4)'
CM	41	(Italy) Simone Muratore		(substituted off) 72'
RF	33	(Italy) Federico Bernardeschi
CF	21	(Argentina) Gonzalo Higuaín		(substituted off) 70'
LF	17	(Croatia) Mario Mandžukić (c)
Substitutes:
GK	31	(Italy) Carlo Pinsoglio		(substituted on) 39' (substituted off) 60(1)'
GK	77	(Italy) Gianluigi Buffon		(substituted on) 60(1)'
DF	19	(Italy) Leonardo Bonucci		(substituted on) 60(2)'
MF	25	(France) Adrien Rabiot		(substituted on) 60(3)'
MF	14	(France) Blaise Matuidi		(substituted on) 60(4)'
DF	36	(Italy) Luca Coccolo		(substituted on) 65'
FW	44	(England) Stephy Mavididi		(substituted on) 70'
MF	45	(Brazil) Matheus Pereira		(substituted on) 72'
MF	35	(Italy) Alessandro Di Pardo		(substituted on) 84'
Manager:
(Italy) Maurizio Sarri

Most Valuable Player:
(Brazil) Cesinha

Assistant referees:
(South Korea) Yoon Kwang-ryeol
(South Korea) Park Sang-jun

Fourth official:
(South Korea) Kim Jong-hyeok

=== 2022 ===
E-commerce company Coupang hosted Tottenham Hotspur's friendlies against K League All-Stars and Sevilla on 13 and 16 July 2022 respectively under the name of "Coupang Play Series".

13 July 2022
UTC+9 20:00

Team K League	3–6	Tottenham Hotspur
Cho Gue-sung 45+2'; Veldwijk 52'; Amano 71'	Report	Dier 29'; Kim Jin-hyuk 46' (o.g.); Kane 53', 74'; Son Heung-min 67' (pen.), 84'

Seoul World Cup Stadium, Seoul
Attendance: 64,100
Referee: Kim Jong-hyeok

Team K League	Tottenham Hotspur

GK	21	(South Korea) Jo Hyeon-woo		(substituted off) 46(1)'
RB	14	(South Korea) Park Seung-wook		(substituted off) 69'
CB	4	(South Korea) Jeong Tae-wook		(substituted off) 46(2)'
CB	44	(Netherlands) Dave Bulthuis		(substituted off) 46(3)'
LB	3	(South Korea) Kim Jin-su (c)		(substituted off) 46(4)'
RM	22	(South Korea) Kwon Chang-hoon		(substituted off) 32(1)'
CM	26	(Serbia) Aleksandar Paločević		(substituted off) 46(5)'
CM	8	(South Korea) Paik Seung-ho		(substituted off) 46(6)'
LM	17	(South Korea) Kim Dae-won		(substituted off) 46(7)'
CF	9	(South Korea) Cho Gue-sung		(substituted off) 46(8)'
CF	10	(South Korea) Lee Seung-woo		(substituted off) 32(2)'
Substitutes:
GK	41	(South Korea) Kim Young-kwang		(substituted on) 46(1)'
DF	47	(South Korea) Kim Dong-min	(red card) 73'	(substituted on) 69'
DF	36	(South Korea) Kim Ji-soo		(substituted on) 46(3)'
DF	23	(South Korea) Lee Ki-je		(substituted on) 46(4)'
MF	5	(South Korea) Lee Myung-joo		(substituted on) 46(2)'
MF	27	(South Korea) Yang Hyun-jun		(substituted on) 32(1)' (substituted off) 62(1)'
MF	11	(Japan) Jun Amano		(substituted on) 62(1)'
MF	6	(South Korea) Sin Jin-ho		(substituted on) 46(6)'
MF	12	(Guinea-Bissau) Gerso Fernandes		(substituted on) 46(7)'
FW	18	(South Korea) Joo Min-kyu		(substituted on) 46(5)'
FW	7	(South Korea) Kim Jin-hyuk		(substituted on) 46(8)'
FW	19	(Netherlands) Lars Veldwijk		(substituted on) 32(2)' (substituted off) 62(2)'
FW	13	(South Korea) Cho Young-wook		(substituted on) 62(2)'
Manager:
(South Korea) Kim Sang-sik

GK	40	(England) Brandon Austin	(substituted off) 46(1)'
RB	12	(Brazil) Emerson Royal	(substituted off) 47'
CB	17	(Argentina) Cristian Romero	(substituted off) 46(2)'
CB	6	(Colombia) Davinson Sánchez	(substituted off) 77(2)'
LB	19	(England) Ryan Sessegnon	(substituted off) 46(3)'
DM	15	(England) Eric Dier (c)	(substituted off) 77(1)'
CM	30	(Uruguay) Rodrigo Bentancur	(substituted off) 46(4)'
CM	4	(England) Oliver Skipp	(substituted off) 46(5)'
RF	27	(Brazil) Lucas Moura	(substituted off) 76'
CF	9	(Brazil) Richarlison	(substituted off) 77(3)'
LF	11	(Spain) Bryan Gil	(substituted off) 46(6)'
Substitutes:
GK	1	(France) Hugo Lloris	(substituted on) 46(1)'
DF	25	(England) Japhet Tanganga	(substituted on) 46(2)'
DF	46	(England) Malachi Fagan-Walcott	(substituted on) 77(1)'
DF	98	(England) Charlie Sayers	(substituted on) 77(2)'
DF	2	(Republic of Ireland) Matt Doherty	(substituted on) 46(3)'
MF	7	(South Korea) Son Heung-min	(substituted on) 47'
MF	29	(Senegal) Pape Matar Sarr	(substituted on) 46(4)'
MF	5	(Denmark) Pierre-Emile Højbjerg	(substituted on) 46(5)'
MF	42	(England) Harvey White	(substituted on) 76'
FW	39	(Republic of Ireland) Troy Parrott	(substituted on) 77(3)'
FW	10	(England) Harry Kane	(substituted on) 46(6)'
Manager:
(Italy) Antonio Conte

=== 2023 ===
The second match of the 2023 Coupang Play Series was contested by Atlético Madrid and K League All-Stars.

27 July 2023
UTC+9 20:00

Team K League	3–2	Atlético Madrid
Kryvotsyuk 50'; Paločević 89' (pen.); Lee Soon-min 90+4'	Report	Lemar 13'; Martín 85'

Seoul World Cup Stadium, Seoul
Attendance: 58,903
Referee: Kim Hee-gon

GK	1	(South Korea) Lee Chang-geun	(substituted off) 46(1)'
RB	66	(South Korea) Seol Young-woo
CB	3	(South Korea) Jeong Tae-wook	(substituted off) 63'
CB	19	(South Korea) Kim Young-gwon	(substituted off) 46(2)'
LB	23	(South Korea) Lee Ki-je	(substituted off) 46(3)'
DM	14	(South Korea) Han Kook-young	(substituted off) 54(1)'
DM	8	(South Korea) Paik Seung-ho	(substituted off) 46(4)'
RW	7	(South Korea) Na Sang-ho	(substituted off) 54(2)'
AM	33	(South Korea) Bae Jun-ho	(substituted off) 46(5)'
LW	10	(South Korea) Lee Seung-woo	(substituted off) 46(6)'
CF	18	(South Korea) Joo Min-kyu	(substituted off) 46(7)'
Substitutes: (Note: Timo Letschert withdrew due to COVID-19.)
GK	21	(South Korea) Jo Hyeon-woo	(substituted on) 46(1)'
DF	2	(South Korea) Hwang Jae-won	(substituted on) 54(1)'
DF	5	(Australia) Alex Grant	(substituted on) 46(2)'
DF	98	(Azerbaijan) Anton Kryvotsyuk	(substituted on) 46(3)'
MF	26	(Serbia) Aleksandar Paločević	(substituted on) 54(2)'
MF	44	(South Korea) Lee Soon-min	(substituted on) 46(4)'
FW	9	(Brazil) Zeca	(substituted on) 46(7)'
FW	11	(Brazil) Cesinha	(substituted on) 46(5)'
FW	12	(Guinea-Bissau) Gerso Fernandes	(substituted on) 46(6)'
FW	17	(Brazil) Reis	(substituted on) 63'
Manager:
(South Korea) Hong Myung-bo

GK	1	(Croatia) Ivo Grbić	(substituted off) 46(1)'
RB	3	(Spain) César Azpilicueta	(substituted off) 46(2)'
CB	15	(Montenegro) Stefan Savić	(substituted off) 46(3)'
CB	20	(Belgium) Axel Witsel	(substituted off) 46(4)'
CB	22	(Spain) Mario Hermoso	(substituted off) 46(5)'
LB	12	(Brazil) Samuel Lino	(substituted off) 46(6)'
CM	5	(Argentina) Rodrigo De Paul	(substituted off) 46(7)'
CM	6	(Spain) Koke	(substituted off) 46(8)'
CM	11	(France) Thomas Lemar	(substituted off) 46(9)'
RF	7	(France) Antoine Griezmann	(substituted off) 46(10)'
LF	19	(Spain) Álvaro Morata	(substituted off) 46(11)'
Substitutes:
GK	25	(Brazil) Antonio Gomis	(substituted on) 46(1)'
DF	4	(Turkey) Çağlar Söyüncü	(substituted on) 46(4)'
DF	18	(Spain) Javi Galán	(substituted on) 46(6)'
DF	27	(Cyprus) Ilias Kostis	(substituted on) 46(5)'
DF	29	(Uruguay) Santiago Mouriño	(substituted on) 46(3)'
MF	8	(Spain) Saúl Ñíguez	(substituted on) 46(9)'
MF	24	(Spain) Pablo Barrios	(substituted on) 46(7)'
MF	26	(Spain) Aitor Gismera	(substituted on) 46(8)'
FW	10	(Argentina) Ángel Correa	(substituted on) 46(11)'
FW	28	(Spain) Carlos Martín	(substituted on) 46(2)'
FW	32	(Spain) Rodrigo Riquelme	(substituted on) 46(10)'
Manager:
(Argentina) Diego Simeone

=== 2024 ===
In 2024, Coupang hosted Tottenham Hotspur's friendlies against K League All-Stars and Bayern Munich on 31 July and 3 August respectively.

31 July 2024
UTC+9 20:00

Team K League	3–4	Tottenham Hotspur
Iljutcenko 52', 54'; Oberdan 81'	Report	Kulusevski 29'; Son Heung-min 38', 45+2'; Lankshear 67'

Seoul World Cup Stadium, Seoul
Attendance: 63,395
Referee: Kim Jong-hyeok

GK	21	(South Korea) Jo Hyeon-woo	(substituted off) 46(4)'
RB	16	(South Korea) Choi Jun	(substituted off) 46(8)'
CB	25	(South Korea) Park Seung-wook	(substituted off) 46(3)'
CB	4	(South Korea) Park Jin-seob	(substituted off) 46(11)'
LB	13	(South Korea) Lee Myung-jae	(substituted off) 46(2)'
DM	14	(South Korea) Lee Dong-gyeong	(substituted off) 46(1)'
DM	6	(South Korea) Jeong Ho-yeon	(substituted off) 46(7)'
RW	7	(South Korea) Yoon Do-young	(substituted off) 46(10)'
AM	10	(South Korea) Lee Seung-woo	(substituted off) 46(9)'
LW	47	(South Korea) Yang Min-hyeok	(substituted off) 46(6)'
CF	18	(South Korea) Joo Min-kyu	(substituted off) 46(5)'
Substitutes:
GK	1	(South Korea) Hwang In-jae	(substituted on) 46(4)'
DF	82	(Croatia) Matej Jonjić	(substituted on) 46(1)'
DF	77	(Brazil) Wanderson	(substituted on) 46(2)'
DF	74	(Montenegro) Marko Tući	(substituted on) 46(3)'
DF	88	(South Korea) Hwang Mun-ki (Note: Selected for the All-Star Team to replace Hwang Jae-won, originally selected.)	(substituted on) 46(10)'
MF	11	(Brazil) Cesinha	(substituted on) 46(6)'
MF	8	(Brazil) Oberdan	(substituted on) 46(7)'
MF	5	(Brazil) Italo	(substituted on) 46(11)'
FW	9	(Russia) Stanislav Iljutcenko	(substituted on) 46(5)'
FW	27	(South Korea) Jeong Jae-hee	(substituted on) 46(8)'
FW	70	(Brazil) Anderson Oliveira	(substituted on) 46(9)'
Manager:
(South Korea) Park Tae-ha

GK	1	(Italy) Guglielmo Vicario	(substituted off) 46(3)'
RB	23	(Spain) Pedro Porro	(substituted off) 64'
CB	12	(Brazil) Emerson Royal	(substituted off) 72'
CB	33	(Wales) Ben Davies	(substituted off) 63(5)'
LB	63	(England) Jamie Donley	(substituted off) 63(2)'
CM	29	(Senegal) Pape Matar Sarr	(substituted off) 46(1)'
CM	14	(England) Archie Gray	(substituted off) 63(6)'
CM	15	(Sweden) Lucas Bergvall	(substituted off) 46(2)'
RW	22	(Wales) Brennan Johnson	(substituted off) 63(4)'
CF	21	(Sweden) Dejan Kulusevski	(substituted off) 63(3)'
LW	7	(South Korea) Son Heung-min	(substituted off) 63(1)'
Substitutes:
GK	40	(England) Brandon Austin	(substituted on) 46(3)'
DF	24	(England) Djed Spence	(substituted on) 64'
DF	6	(Romania) Radu Drăgușin	(substituted on) 72'
MF	4	(England) Oliver Skipp	(substituted on) 46(1)'
MF	10	(Denmark) James Maddison	(substituted on) 46(2)'
MF	55	(England) George Abbott	(substituted on) 63(2)'
MF	59	(England) Mikey Moore	(substituted on) 63(4)'
MF	45	(England) Alfie Devine	(substituted on) 63(5)'
MF	8	(Mali) Yves Bissouma	(substituted on) 63(6)'
FW	16	(Germany) Timo Werner	(substituted on) 63(1)'
FW	62	(England) Will Lankshear	(substituted on) 63(3)'
Manager:
(Australia) Ange Postecoglou

=== 2025 ===
In 2025, Coupang hosted Newcastle United's friendlies against K League All-Stars and Tottenham Hotspur on 30 July and 3 August respectively.

30 July 2025
UTC+9 20:00

Team K League	1–0	Newcastle United
Kim Jin-gyu 36'	Report

Suwon World Cup Stadium, Suwon
Attendance: 27,422
Referee: Kim Woo-sung

GK	21	(South Korea) Jo Hyeon-woo	(substituted off) 46(1)'
RB	2	(South Korea) Eo Jeong-won (Note: Selected for the All-Star Team to replace Kim Moon-hwan, originally selected.)	(substituted off) 61'
CB	5	(South Korea) Byeon Jun-soo	(substituted off) 46(3)'
CB	4	(South Korea) Park Jin-seob	(substituted off) 46(2)'
LB	55	(Netherlands) Thomas Oude Kotte (Note: Selected for the All-Star Team to replace Lee Tae-seok, originally selected.)	(substituted off) 81'
DM	16	(South Korea) Kim Dong-hyun	(substituted off) 46(5)'
CM	20	(South Korea) Lee Chang-min	(substituted off) 46(7)'
CM	97	(South Korea) Kim Jin-gyu	(substituted off) 46(6)'
RW	14	(South Korea) Lee Dong-gyeong	(substituted off) 46(4)'
LW	10	(South Korea) Jeon Jin-woo	(substituted off) 46(8)'
CF	9	(Brazil) Bruno Mota
Substitutes:
GK	1	(South Korea) Kim Kyeong-min	(substituted on) 46(1)'
DF	98	(Azerbaijan) Anton Kryvotsyuk	(substituted on) 46(2)'
DF	3	(Brazil) Caio Marcelo	(substituted on) 46(3)'
DF	19	(South Korea) Kim Young-gwon	(substituted on) 61'
DF	24	(South Korea) Han Hyeon-seo	(substituted on) 81'
MF	32	(Brazil) Luan Dias	(substituted on) 46(4)'
MF	6	(Sweden) Darijan Bojanić	(substituted on) 46(5)' (substituted off) 75'
MF	8	(Brazil) Oberdan	(substituted on) 46(7)'
MF	41	(South Korea) Hwang Do-yun	(substituted on) 75'
FW	11	(Brazil) Cesinha	(substituted on) 46(6)'
FW	7	(Albania) Jasir Asani	(substituted on) 46(8)'
Manager:
(South Korea) Kim Pan-gon

GK	22	(England) Nick Pope	(substituted off) 72(1)'
RB	17	(Sweden) Emil Krafth	(substituted off) 72(2)'
CB	37	(Republic of Ireland) Alex Murphy
CB	6	(England) Jamaal Lascelles
LB	21	(England) Tino Livramento
CM	28	(England) Joe Willock	(substituted off) 90+2'
CM	8	(Italy) Sandro Tonali	(substituted off) 77'
CM	67	(England) Lewis Miley
RW	20	(Sweden) Anthony Elanga
CF	18	(Denmark) William Osula	(substituted off) 82'
LW	10	(England) Anthony Gordon
Substitutes:
GK	19	(Greece) Odysseas Vlachodimos
GK	26	(England) John Ruddy
GK	29	(England) Mark Gillespie
GK	31	(England) Max Thompson	(substituted on) 72(1)'
DF	2	(England) Kieran Trippier
DF	3	(England) Lewis Hall
DF	5	(Switzerland) Fabian Schär
DF	13	(England) Matt Targett
DF	30	(Scotland) Harrison Ashby	(substituted on) 72(2)'
DF	33	(England) Dan Burn
MF	7	(Brazil) Joelinton
MF	11	(England) Harvey Barnes
MF	23	(England) Jacob Murphy
MF	39	(Brazil) Bruno Guimarães
MF	44	(England) Alfie Harrison	(substituted on) 90+2'
MF	45	(Norway) Travis Hernes	(substituted on) 77'
MF	54	(England) Anthony Munda
MF	64	(South Korea) Park Seung-soo	(substituted on) 82'
FW	62	(England) Sean Neave
Manager:
(England) Eddie Howe

=== 2026 ===
In 2026, Coupang hosted Manchester City's friendlies against K League All-Stars and Atlético Madrid on 5 and 9 August respectively.

5 August 2026
UTC+9 20:00

Team K League	1–3	Manchester City
Kim Dae-won 12'	Report	Aït-Nouri 9'; Reijnders 20'; Mubama 23'

Seoul World Cup Stadium, Seoul
Attendance: 28,036
Referee: Park Byeong-jin

GK	31	(South Korea) Song Bum-keun	(substituted off) 46(1)'
RB	33	(South Korea) Kim Moon-hwan	(substituted off) 46(2)'
CB	5	(Jordan) Yazan Al-Arab	(substituted off) 46(3)'
CB	13	(South Korea) Lee Gi-hyuk	(substituted off) 46(4)'
LB	2	(South Korea) Eo Jeong-won	(substituted off) 46(5)'
CM	30	(South Korea) Kim Bong-soo	(substituted off) 35'
CM	55	(South Korea) Park Tae-jun	(substituted off) 46(6)'
RW	14	(South Korea) Lee Dong-gyeong	(substituted off) 46(7)'
LW	17	(South Korea) Kim Dae-won	(substituted off) 46(8)'
SS	7	(Brazil) Matheus Oliveira	(substituted off) 46(9)'
CF	99	(Brazil) Yago Cariello	(substituted off) 46(10)'
Substitutes:
GK	25	(South Korea) Gu Sung-yun	(substituted on) 46(1)'
DF	15	(Spain) Juan Ibiza	(substituted on) 46(4)'
DF	21	(South Korea) Kwon Kyung-won	(substituted on) 46(3)'
DF	26	(South Korea) An Tae-hyun	(substituted on) 46(5)'
DF	40	(South Korea) Kim Ryun-seong	(substituted on) 73'
MF	16	(South Korea) Ki Sung-yueng	(substituted on) 46(6)'
MF	37	(South Korea) Kim Ju-chan	(substituted on) 46(8)'
MF	42	(South Korea) Son Jeong-beom	(substituted on) 35' (substituted off) 69'
MF	70	(South Korea) Ha Seung-un	(substituted on) 46(2)' (substituted off) 73'
MF	88	(South Korea) Moon Min-seo	(substituted on) 69'
FW	9	(Montenegro) Stefan Mugoša	(substituted on) 46(10)'
FW	10	(South Korea) Lee Seung-woo	(substituted on) 46(9)'
FW	11	(Brazil) Jefferson Galego	(substituted on) 46(7)'
Manager:
(South Korea) Chung Jung-yong

GK	25	(Italy) Gianluigi Donnarumma	(substituted off) 46(1)'
RB	82	(England) Rico Lewis	(substituted off) 61'
CB	3	(Portugal) Rúben Dias	(substituted off) 46(2)'
CB	45	(Uzbekistan) Abdukodir Khusanov	(substituted off) 46(3)'
LB	24	(Croatia) Joško Gvardiol	(substituted off) 46(4)'
CM	4	(Netherlands) Tijjani Reijnders	(substituted off) 62(4)'
CM	8	(Croatia) Mateo Kovačić	(substituted off) 46(5)'
AM	47	(England) Phil Foden	(substituted off) 62(1)'
RW	42	(Ghana) Antoine Semenyo	(substituted off) 46(6)'
CF	67	(England) Divin Mubama	(substituted off) 62(3)'
LW	21	(Algeria) Rayan Aït-Nouri	(substituted off) 62(2)'
Substitutes:
GK	13	(England) Marcus Bettinelli	(substituted on) 46(1)'
GK	84	(England) Jack Wint
GK	92	(France) Max-Edgar Chabot
DF	22	(Brazil) Vitor Reis	(substituted on) 46(3)'
DF	61	(England) Kaden Braithwaite
DF	68	(England) Max Alleyne	(substituted on) 46(2)'
DF	89	(England) Matthew Henderson-Hall
DF	91	(England) Stephen Mfuni	(substituted on) 46(4)'
MF	14	(Spain) Nico González	(substituted on) 46(5)'
MF	27	(Portugal) Matheus Nunes	(substituted on) 61'
MF	30	(Argentina) Claudio Echeverri	(substituted on) 62(1)'
MF	63	(England) Divine Mukasa
MF	75	(England) Floyd Samba
MF	93	(England) Xavier Parker
FW	7	(Egypt) Omar Marmoush	(substituted on) 62(3)'
FW	26	(Brazil) Savinho	(substituted on) 46(6)'
FW	40	(England) Jeremy Monga	(substituted on) 62(2)'
FW	71	(France) Mahamadou Sangaré
FW	81	(England) Jaden Heskey	(substituted on) 62(4)'
Manager:
(Italy) Enzo Maresca

Most Valuable Player:
(Ghana) Antoine Semenyo

== Most Valuable Player ==
Year	Player	Team
1991	(South Korea) Lee Young-jin	Blue
1992	(South Korea) Kim Hyun-seok	White
1995	(South Korea) Roh Sang-rae	Blue Dragon
1997	(South Korea) Kim Jung-hyuk	Blue Dragon
1998	(South Korea) Lee Dong-gook	South
1999	(South Korea) Gwak Kyung-keun	Central
2000	(South Korea) Kim Byung-ji	South
2001	(South Korea) Lee Dong-gook (2)	South
2002	(Federal Republic of Yugoslavia) Saša Drakulić	Central
2003	(South Korea) Lee Dong-gook (3)	South
2004	(South Korea) Kim Eun-jung	Central
2005	(South Korea) Park Chu-young	Central
2006	(Montenegro) Dženan Radončić	Central
2007	(Brazil) Denílson	Central
2008	(South Korea) Choi Sung-kuk	K League All-Stars
2009	(South Korea) Lee Jung-soo	J.League All-Stars
2010	(Argentina) Lionel Messi	Barcelona
2012	(South Korea) Lee Dong-gook (4)	Team 2012
2013	(South Korea) Koo Ja-cheol	Team Challenge
2014	(South Korea) Park Ji-sung	Team Park Ji-sung
2015	(South Korea) Yeom Ki-hun	Team Choi Kang-hee
2019	(Brazil) Cesinha	Team K League
2026	(Ghana) Antoine Semenyo	Manchester City

== See also ==
- K League
- K League Best XI
- JOMO Cup
