= Kwon Chan-soo =

South Korean footballer

Kwon Chan-Soo
Personal information
- Full name: Kwon Chan-Soo
- Date of birth: May 30, 1974 (age 52)
- Place of birth: South Korea
- Height: 1.83 m (6 ft 0 in)
- Position: Goalkeeper

Youth career
- Dankook University

Senior career*
Years	Team	Apps	(Gls)
1999–2003	Seongnam Ilhwa Chunma	66	(0)
2004	Incheon United	4	(0)
2005	Seongnam Ilhwa Chunma	10	(0)
2005–2008	Incheon United	8	(0)
- * Club domestic league appearances and goals

- Kwon Chan-soo
- Hangul: 권찬수
- Hanja: 權贊修
- RR: Gwon Chansu
- MR: Kwŏn Ch'ansu

Kwon Chan-Soo (born May 30, 1974) is a South Korean former football player. His previous club is K-League side Seongnam Ilhwa Chunma and Incheon United.

== Club career statistics ==
Club performance			League		Cup		League Cup		Continental		Total		
Season	Club	League	Apps	Goals	Apps	Goals	Apps	Goals	Apps	Goals	Apps	Goals	
South Korea			League		KFA Cup		League Cup		Asia		Total		
1999	Cheonan Ilhwa Chunma	K-League	14	0	?	?	8	0	-				
2000	Seongnam Ilhwa Chunma	K-League	10	0	?	?	4	0	?	?			
2001	Seongnam Ilhwa Chunma	K-League	6	0	?	?	1	0	?	?			
2002	Seongnam Ilhwa Chunma	K-League	14	0	?	?	1	0	?	?			
2003	Seongnam Ilhwa Chunma	K-League	22	0	1	0	-		?	?			
2004	Seongnam Ilhwa Chunma	K-League	Incheon United	4	0	0	0	4	0	-		8	0
2005	Seongnam Ilhwa Chunma	K-League	Incheon United	0	0	0	0	4	0	-		4	0
2005	Seongnam Ilhwa Chunma	K-League	Seongnam Ilhwa Chunma	10	0	0	0	0	0	-		10	0
2006	Seongnam Ilhwa Chunma	K-League	Incheon United	1	0	0	0	2	0	-		3	0
2007	Seongnam Ilhwa Chunma	K-League	Incheon United	7	0	1	0	5	0	-		13	0
2008	Seongnam Ilhwa Chunma	K-League	Incheon United	0	0	0	0	0	0	-		0	0
Total	South Korea		88	0			29	0					
Career total			88	0			29	0					
