= Maciel (footballer, born 1972) =

Brazilian footballer

Personal information
- Full name: Maciel Luiz Franco
- Date of birth: March 15, 1972 (age 54)
- Place of birth: Bandeira do Sul, Minas Gerais, Brazil
- Height: 1.75 m (5 ft 9 in)
- Position: Centre back

Senior career*
Years	Team	Apps	(Gls)
1993–1996	União São João		
1997–2003	Chunnam Dragons	133	(9)
- * Club domestic league appearances and goals as of January 10, 2012

Maciel Luiz Franco (born 15 March 1972 in Bandeira do Sul), also known as Maciel, is a Brazilian former professional football player.

== Career ==
=== Chunnam Dragons ===
Maciel spent seven years playing for South Korean K-League club Chunnam Dragons, from 1997 to 2003. He was awarded K-League Best Eleven for four straight seasons and won the K-League Best Defender of the Year in the 1998 season. He wanted to gain Korean citizenship before the 2002 FIFA World Cup, but abandoned his attempt eventually.

== Club career statistics ==
Club performance			League		Cup		League Cup		Total	
Season	Club	League	Apps	Goals	Apps	Goals	Apps	Goals	Apps	Goals
Korea Republic			League		FA Cup		K-League Cup		Total	
1997	Chunnam Dragons	K-League	13	3	-		-		13	3
1998	Chunnam Dragons	K-League	17	1	-		10	0	27	1
1999	Chunnam Dragons	K-League	27	2	-		9	0	36	2
2000	Chunnam Dragons	K-League	25	0	-		11	1	36	1
2001	Chunnam Dragons	K-League	22	0	-		7	0	29	0
2002	Chunnam Dragons	K-League	19	2	-		8	0	27	2
2003	Chunnam Dragons	K-League	10	1	-		-		10	1
Country	Korea Republic		133	9	-		45	1	178	10
Total			133	9	-		45	1	178	10
