= Seo Dong-won (footballer, born 1975) =

South Korean footballer

Seo Dong-Won 서동원
Personal information
- Full name: Seo Dong-Won
- Date of birth: August 14, 1975 (age 51)
- Place of birth: Seoul, South Korea
- Height: 1.84 m (6 ft 0 in)
- Position: Midfielder

Youth career
- 1994–1997: Yonsei University

Senior career*
Years	Team	Apps	(Gls)
1998–2000	Daejeon Citizen	55	(7)
2001	Suwon Samsung Bluewings	2	(0)
2001–2002	Jeonbuk Hyundai Motors	18	(1)
2003–2004	Gwangju Sangmu Bulsajo (Army)	41	(0)
2005–2006	Incheon United	32	(4)
2006–2007	Seongnam Ilhwa Chunma	15	(0)
2008–2010	Busan I'Park	36	(0)

International career
1998–2001	South Korea	8	(1)
- * Club domestic league appearances and goals

- Seo Dong-won
- Hangul: 서동원
- Hanja: 徐東源
- RR: Seo Dongwon
- MR: Sŏ Tongwŏn

Seo Dong-Won (born August 14, 1975) is a South Korean former football player. He played for Daejeon Citizen, Suwon Samsung Bluewings, Jeonbuk Hyundai Motors, Gwangju Sangmu Bulsajo (army), Incheon United, Seongnam Ilhwa Chunma).and Busan I'Park.

== Career statistics ==
Club performance			League		Cup		League Cup		Continental		Total	
Season	Club	League	Apps	Goals	Apps	Goals	Apps	Goals	Apps	Goals	Apps	Goals
South Korea			League		KFA Cup		League Cup		Asia		Total	
1998	Daejeon Citizen	K-League	15	1	?	?	14	0	—			
1999	Daejeon Citizen	K-League	19	2	?	?	9	1	—			
2000	Daejeon Citizen	K-League	21	4	?	?	7	0	—			
2001	Suwon Samsung Bluewings	K-League	2	0	?	?	8	0	?	?		
2001	Jeonbuk Hyundai Motors	K-League	15	1	?	?	0	0	?	?		
2002	Jeonbuk Hyundai Motors	K-League	3	0	?	?	4	0	?	?		
2003	Gwangju Sangmu Bulsajo	K-League	19	0	2	0	—		—		21	0
2004	Gwangju Sangmu Bulsajo	K-League	22	0	0	0	7	1	—		29	1
2005	Incheon United	K-League	25	4	0	0	5	1	—		30	5
2006	Incheon United	K-League	7	0	1	0	1	0	—		9	0
2006	Seongnam Ilhwa Chunma	K-League	9	0	0	0	4	0	—		13	0
2007	Seongnam Ilhwa Chunma	K-League	6	0	0	0	1	0	?	?		
2008	Busan I'Park	K-League	12	0	0	0	6	1	—		18	1
2009	Busan I'Park	K-League	19	0	2	0	8	0	—		29	0
2010	Busan I'Park	K-League	5	0	0	0	0	0	—		5	0
Total	South Korea		199	14			74	4				
Career total			199	14			74	4				

=== International ===
Scores and results list South Korea's goal tally first, score column indicates score after each Seo goal.

List of international goals scored by Seo Dong-won
No.	Date	Venue	Opponent	Score	Result	Competition
1	21 January 2000	North Harbour Stadium, Auckland, New Zealand	New Zealand	1–0	1–0	Friendly
