= Kim Tae-young (footballer, born 1970) =

South Korean footballer

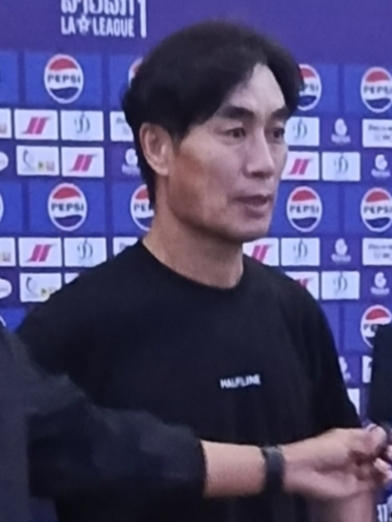
- Kim in 2025

Personal information
- Full name: Kim Tae-young
- Date of birth: 8 November 1970 (age 55)
- Place of birth: Goheung, Jeonnam, South Korea
- Height: 1.78 m (5 ft 10 in)
- Position: Defender

Team information
- Current team: Champasak Avenir (manager)

College career
Years	Team	Apps	(Gls)
1989–1992	Dong-A University		

Senior career*
Years	Team	Apps	(Gls)
1993–1994	Kookmin Bank		
1995–2005	Jeonnam Dragons	199	(4)

International career
1993	South Korea B		
1992–2004	South Korea	105	(3)

Managerial career
- 2006–2007: Kwandong University (assistant)
- 2009: South Korea U20 (assistant)
- 2009–2012: South Korea U23 (assistant)
- 2013: Ulsan Hyundai (assistant)
- 2013–2014: South Korea (assistant)
- 2015–2016: Jeonnam Dragons (assistant)
- 2017–2018: Suwon Samsung Bluewings (assistant)
- 2019–2022: Cheonan City
- 2025–: Champasak Avenir
Medal record
Representing South Korea
Men's football
Summer Universiade
Silver medal – second place	1993 Buffalo
AFC Asian Cup
Bronze medal – third place	2000 Lebanon
EAFF Championship
Winner	2003 Japan
- * Club domestic league appearances and goals

- Kim Tae-young
- Hangul: 김태영
- Hanja: 金泰映
- RR: Gim Taeyeong
- MR: Kim T'aeyŏng

Kim Tae-young (born 8 November 1970) is a South Korean football manager and former player who played as a defender who is currently the manager of Lao League 1 club Champasak Avenir.

== International career ==
Kim played for the South Korea national team as a centre-back or left back, and was a participant in 1998 and 2002 FIFA World Cup. In the 2002 World Cup, he formed South Korea's defensive trio with Hong Myung-bo and Choi Jin-cheul, and contributed to South Korea's fourth-place finish. He was noted for his nose guard mask, which he wore after his nose was broken by Christian Vieri's arm in the round of 16 against Italy.

== Managerial career ==
Kim was the assistant coach to Hong Myung-bo for the South Korea U20 in 2009 and the South Korea U23 from 2009 until 2012.

In January 2013, Kim joined Kim Ho-kon as his assistant coach at Ulsan Hyundai.

In July 2013, Kim reunited with Hong Myung-bo joining him as the assistant coach of the South Korea national team where he was part of the South Korea's coaching staff during the 2014 FIFA World Cup.

== Career statistics ==
=== Club ===
Appearances and goals by club, season and competition
Club	Season	League			National cup		League cup		Continental		Other		Total	
Club	Season	Division	Apps	Goals	Apps	Goals	Apps	Goals	Apps	Goals	Apps	Goals	Apps	Goals
Kookmin Bank	1993	National Semipro League	?	?	?	?	?	?	—		—		?	?
Kookmin Bank	1994	National Semipro League	?	?	?	?	?	?	—		—		?	?
Kookmin Bank	Total		?	?	?	?	?	?	—		—		?	?
Jeonnam Dragons	1995	K League	25	2	—		7	0	—		—		32	2
Jeonnam Dragons	1996	K League	21	0	?	?	7	1	—		—		28	1
Jeonnam Dragons	1997	K League	7	1	?	?	10	0	—		—		17	1
Jeonnam Dragons	1998	K League	18	0	?	?	1	0	?	?	—		19	0
Jeonnam Dragons	1999	K League	20	0	?	?	9	0	?	?	1 (Note: Appearance in K League Championship)	0	30	0
Jeonnam Dragons	2000	K League	23	0	?	?	8	0	—		—		31	0
Jeonnam Dragons	2001	K League	20	1	?	?	6	0	—		—		26	1
Jeonnam Dragons	2002	K League	23	0	?	?	1	0	—		—		24	0
Jeonnam Dragons	2003	K League	29	0	?	?	—		—		—		29	0
Jeonnam Dragons	2004	K League	11	0	?	?	0	0	—		1	0	12	0
Jeonnam Dragons	2005	K League	2	0	?	?	0	0	—		—		2	0
Jeonnam Dragons	Total		199	4	?	?	49	1	?	?	2	0	250	5
Career total			199	4	?	?	49	1	?	?	2	0	250	5

=== International ===
Appearances and goals by national team and year
National team	Year	Apps	Goals
South Korea	1992	1	0
South Korea	1993	10	3
South Korea	1996	2	0
South Korea	1997	13	0
South Korea	1998	15	0
South Korea	1999	5	0
South Korea	2000	10	0
South Korea	2001	14	0
South Korea	2002	17	0
South Korea	2003	12	0
South Korea	2004	6	0
Career total		105	3

Results list South Korea's goal tally first.

List of international goals scored by Kim Tae-young
No.	Date	Venue	Cap	Opponent	Score	Result	Competition
1	9 March 1993	Vancouver, Canada	2	Canada	1–0	2–0	Friendly
2	9 June 1993	Seoul, South Korea	8	India	3–0	7–0	1994 FIFA World Cup qualification
3	9 June 1993	Seoul, South Korea	8	India	7–0	7–0	1994 FIFA World Cup qualification

== Filmography ==
=== Television ===
Year	Title	Role	Note(s)	Ref.
2020	Let's Play Soccer	Himself	Episode 40	
2021–present	Kick a Goal	Himself		
2022	Gundesliga	Himself		

== Honours ==
=== Player ===
Kookmin Bank

- Korean National Semipro Championship: 1993

Jeonnam Dragons

- Korean FA Cup: 1997
- Korean League Cup runner-up: 1997, 2000+
- Asian Cup Winners' Cup runner-up: 1998–99

South Korea B

- Summer Universiade silver medal: 1993

South Korea

- AFC Asian Cup third place: 2000
- EAFF Championship: 2003

Individual

- K League All-Star: 1997, 1998, 1999, 2000, 2002, 2003, 2004
- K League 1 Best XI: 2002, 2003
- K League 30th Anniversary Best XI: 2013
- AFC Opta All-time XI at the FIFA World Cup: 2020

=== Television personality ===
List of awards and nominations received by TV personality Kim Tae-young
Award ceremony	Year	Category	Nominated work	Result	Ref.
SBS Entertainment Awards	2022	Leader of the Year Award (Note: Shared with Ha Seok-ju, Kim Byung-ji, Choi Jin-cheul, Choi Sung-yong, Lee Eul-yong, Hyun Young-min, Lee Young-pyo, Oh Beom-seok, Cho Jae-jin and Baek Ji-hoon)	Kick a Goal	Won	

== See also ==
- List of men's footballers with 100 or more international caps
