= Jang Dae-il =

South Korean footballer

Jang Dae-Il 장대일
Personal information
- Full name: Jang Dae-Il
- Date of birth: March 9, 1975 (age 51)
- Place of birth: Incheon, South Korea
- Height: 1.83 m (6 ft 0 in)
- Position: Defender

Youth career
- 1993–1997: Yonsei University

Senior career*
Years	Team	Apps	(Gls)
1998–2000	Cheonan Ilhwa / Seongnam Ilhwa	28	(4)
2000–2003	Busan I'Cons	41	(1)
Total		69	(5)

International career^{‡}
1997–1998	South Korea	15	(0)
- * Club domestic league appearances and goals as of Sep 3 2008 ‡ National team caps and goals as of Sep 3 2008

Jang Dae-Il (born 9 March 1975) is a former South Korean football player. His father is British.

He played for several clubs, including Seongnam Ilhwa Chunma and Busan I'cons.

He played for the South Korea national football team and was a participant at the 1998 FIFA World Cup.

== Club career statistics ==
Club performance			League		Cup		League Cup		Continental		Total	
Season	Club	League	Apps	Goals	Apps	Goals	Apps	Goals	Apps	Goals	Apps	Goals
South Korea			League		KFA Cup		League Cup		Asia		Total	
1998	Cheonan Ilhwa Chunma	K-League	13	2	?	?	1	0	-			
1999	Cheonan Ilhwa Chunma	K-League	15	2	?	?	6	1	-			
2000	Seongnam Ilhwa Chunma	K-League	0	0	?	?	5	0	?	?		
2000	Busan I'cons	K-League	9	0	?	?	2	0	-			
2001	Busan I'cons	K-League	6	1	?	?	9	0	-			
2002	Busan I'cons	K-League	2	0	?	?	3	0	-			
2003	Busan I'cons	K-League	24	0	1	0	-		-		25	0
Total	South Korea		69	5			26	1				
Career total			69	5			26	1				
