= Seo Dong-myung =

South Korean footballer

Personal information
- Full name: Seo Dong-myung
- Date of birth: 4 May 1974 (age 52)
- Place of birth: Samcheok, Gangwon, South Korea
- Height: 1.96 m (6 ft 5 in)
- Position: Goalkeeper

College career
| Years | Team | Apps | (Gls) |
| 1992–1995 | University of Ulsan | | |

Senior career*
| Years | Team | Apps | (Gls) |
| 1996–1997 | Ulsan Hyundai Horang-i | 9 | (0) |
| 1998–1999 | Sangmu FC (draft) | | |
| 2000–2001 | Jeonbuk Hyundai Motors | 43 | (1) |
| 2002–2006 | Ulsan Hyundai Horang-i | 125 | (0) |
| 2007–2008 | Busan IPark | 12 | (0) |
| Total | | 189 | (1) |

International career
| 1994–1996 | South Korea U23 | 28 | (0) |
| 1995–1998 | South Korea | 22 | (0) |
- * Club domestic league appearances and goals

Seo Dong-myung (born 4 May 1974) is a South Korean football coach and former player. He played as a goalkeeper for the South Korea national under-23 team at the 1996 Summer Olympics. He was selected as second-choice goalkeeper for the senior national team for the 1998 FIFA World Cup. After retirement, he coached K League clubs as a goalkeeping coach.

== Honours ==
Ulsan Hyundai Horang-i

- K League 1: 1996, 2005
- Korean Super Cup: 2006
- A3 Champions Cup: 2006
- Korean League Cup runner-up: 2002, 2005

Sangmu FC

- Korean National Semipro League (Autumn): 1998, 1999
- Korean National Semipro Championship: 1999

Jeonbuk Hyundai Motors

- Korean FA Cup: 2000

Individual

- K League All-Star: 2000, 2001
- K League 1 Best XI: 2003
