= Kang Chul =

South Korean footballer

Personal information
- Full name: Kang Chul
- Date of birth: 2 November 1971 (age 54)
- Place of birth: Seoul, South Korea
- Height: 1.76 m (5 ft 9 in)
- Position: Left-back

Team information
- Current team: Hwaseong FC (manager)

College career
Years	Team	Apps	(Gls)
1989–1992	Yonsei University		

Senior career*
Years	Team	Apps	(Gls)
1993–2000	Bucheon SK	102	(7)
1996–1997	→ Sangmu FC (draft)		
2001	LASK Linz	8	(0)
2001–2004	Jeonnam Dragons	61	(1)
Total		171	(8)

International career^{‡}
1991	Korea U20	4	(0)
1991–2000	South Korea U23	27 (Note: Includes five appearances against non-national teams, and three appearances as an overage player in Summer Olympics.)	(0)
1992–2001	South Korea	54	(1)

Managerial career
- 2020: Daejeon Hana Citizen (caretaker)
- 2022–: Hwaseong FC
Medal record
Representing South Korea
Men's football
AFC Asian Cup
Bronze medal – third place	2000 Lebanon
AFC Youth Championship
Winner	1990 َIndonesia
- * Club domestic league appearances and goals as of 15 January 2008 ‡ National team caps and goals as of 15 January 2008

- Kang Chul
- Hangul: 강철
- Hanja: 姜喆
- RR: Gang Cheol
- MR: Kang Ch'ŏl

Kang Chul (born 2 November 1971) is a former South Korean football player who played as a left-back. He played for South Korea in two Summer Olympics and two AFC Asian Cups. After retirement, he became an assistant manager under Hwang Sun-hong for a long time. In the 2013 Korean FA Cup, he was named the best manager after leading Pohang Steelers to win the final instead of Hwang who was sent off in the middle of the match.

== Career statistics ==
=== International ===
Results list South Korea's goal tally first.

List of international goals scored by Kang Chul
No.	Date	Venue	Opponent	Score	Result	Competition
1	13 June 1993	Seoul Olympic Stadium, Seoul, South Korea	Bahrain	1–0	3–0	1994 FIFA World Cup qualification

== Honours ==
=== Player ===
Yonsei University

- Korean President's Cup: 1989

Bucheon SK

- Korean League Cup: 1994, 2000+

Jeonnam Dragons

- Korean FA Cup runner-up: 2003

South Korea U20

- AFC Youth Championship: 1990

South Korea

- AFC Asian Cup third place: 2000

Individual

- K League All-Star: 1995, 1998, 1999, 2000
- K League 1 Best XI: 1999, 2000

=== Manager ===
Individual

- Korean FA Cup Best Manager: 2013
