= Shin Tae-yong =

South Korean football manager (born 1970)

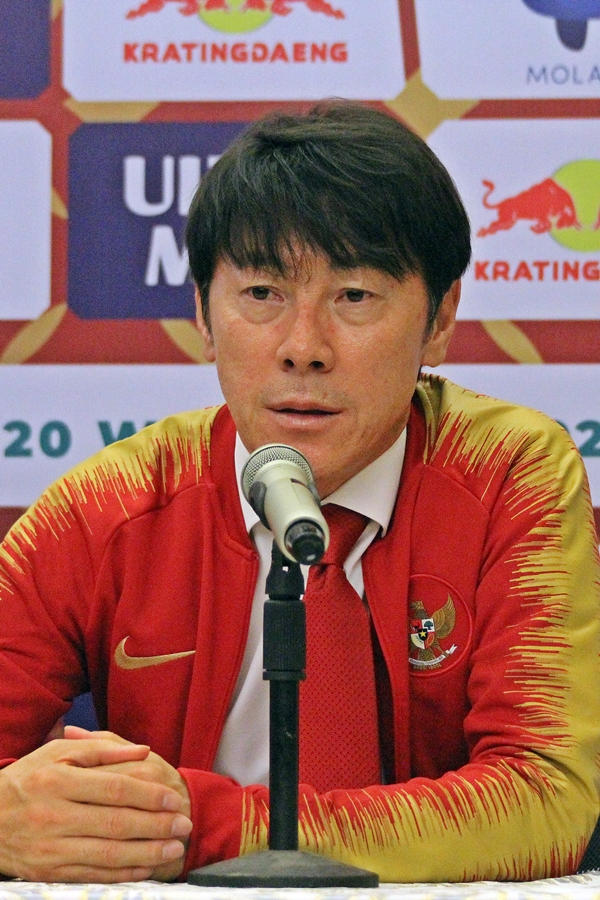
- Shin with Indonesia in 2019

Personal information
- Full name: Shin Tae-yong
- Date of birth: 11 October 1970 (age 56)
- Place of birth: Yeongdeok, South Korea
- Height: 1.73 m (5 ft 8 in)
- Position: Midfielder

Team information
- Current team: Persija Jakarta (head coach)

College career
Years	Team	Apps	(Gls)
1988–1991	Yeungnam University		

Senior career*
Years	Team	Apps	(Gls)
1992–2004	Seongnam Ilhwa Chunma	295	(76)
2005	Queensland Roar	1	(0)
Total		296	(76)

International career
1987	South Korea U17	4	(2)
1988	South Korea U20	1	(1)
1991–1992	South Korea U23	16	(4)
1992–1997	South Korea	23	(3)

Managerial career
- 2005–2008: Queensland Roar (assistant)
- 2008–2012: Seongnam Ilhwa Chunma
- 2014: South Korea (caretaker)
- 2014–2017: South Korea (assistant)
- 2015–2016: South Korea U23
- 2016–2017: South Korea U20
- 2017–2018: South Korea
- 2020–2023: Indonesia U20
- 2020–2025: Indonesia U23
- 2020–2025: Indonesia
- 2025: Ulsan HD
- 2026–: Persija Jakarta
Medal record
Men's football
Representing South Korea (as manager)
AFC U-23 Championship
Runner-up	2016 Qatar
EAFF Championship
Winner	2017 Japan
Representing Indonesia (as manager)
AFF Championship
Runner-up	2020 Singapore
AFF U-23 Championship
Runner-up	2023 Thailand
SEA Games
Bronze medal – third place	2021 Vietnam
- * Club domestic league appearances and goals

- Shin Tae-yong
- Hangul: 신태용
- Hanja: 申台龍
- RR: Sin Taeyong
- MR: Sin T'aeyong

Shin Tae-yong (Korean: 신태용; born 11 October 1970) is a South Korean football manager and former professional player. He is currently the head coach of Indonesian Super League club Persija Jakarta. He is the first man in history to win the AFC Champions League (Asian Club Championship) as both player and manager, having won the 1995 tournament as a player and the 2010 tournament as the manager with Seongnam Ilhwa Chunma.

== Club career ==
After graduating from Yeungnam University, Shin spent 12 seasons playing for Ilhwa Chunma. He won the K League Young Player of the Year Award in 1992, the first year of his professional career. He was a key player for Ilhwa Chunma when they won the K League for three consecutive years from 1993 to 1995. Especially in 1995, he became the Most Valuable Player of the K League, and also won the Asian Club Championship at the end of the year. Afterwards, Ilhwa Chunma faltered for a while, but they succeeded in conquering the league again thanks to Shin's contribution. They once again won the league for three consecutive years from 2001 to 2003, and he also won his second MVP Award in 2001. He scored 99 goals and provided 68 assists in 401 matches across both the K League and the Korean League Cup. Shin is regarded as one of the greatest K League players of all time, and was selected for the K League 30th Anniversary Best XI in 2013.

He could have become a one-club man, but finished his playing career in Australia with the Queensland Roar in the A-League. Shin retired in September 2005 due to an ongoing ankle issue that would have required surgery. He accepted an assistant coaching role at the club, assisting Miron Bleiberg primarily with technical skills.

== International career ==
Shin played 23 international matches including at the 1996 AFC Asian Cup for the South Korea national team.

== Style of play ==
As a player, he was an attacking midfielder. He earned the nickname "Fox of the Ground" by clearly distinguishing when passing and dribbling with sensual and intelligent play.

== Managerial career ==
=== Seongnam Ilhwa Chunma ===
In 2009, Shin became the caretaker manager of Seongnam, leading the team to second place in both the 2009 K League and the 2009 Korean FA Cup, though suffered from a lack of funds. He signed a permanent contract the next year and immediately brought success, winning the 2010 AFC Champions League and the 2011 Korean FA Cup. He became the first man to win the AFC Champions League as both player and manager. However, the team's performance declined in the 2012 season, aggravated by the death of Sun Myung Moon, the founder of the Unification Church which owned the club, in the middle of the season. He eventually resigned from Seongnam after finishing the season.

=== South Korea ===
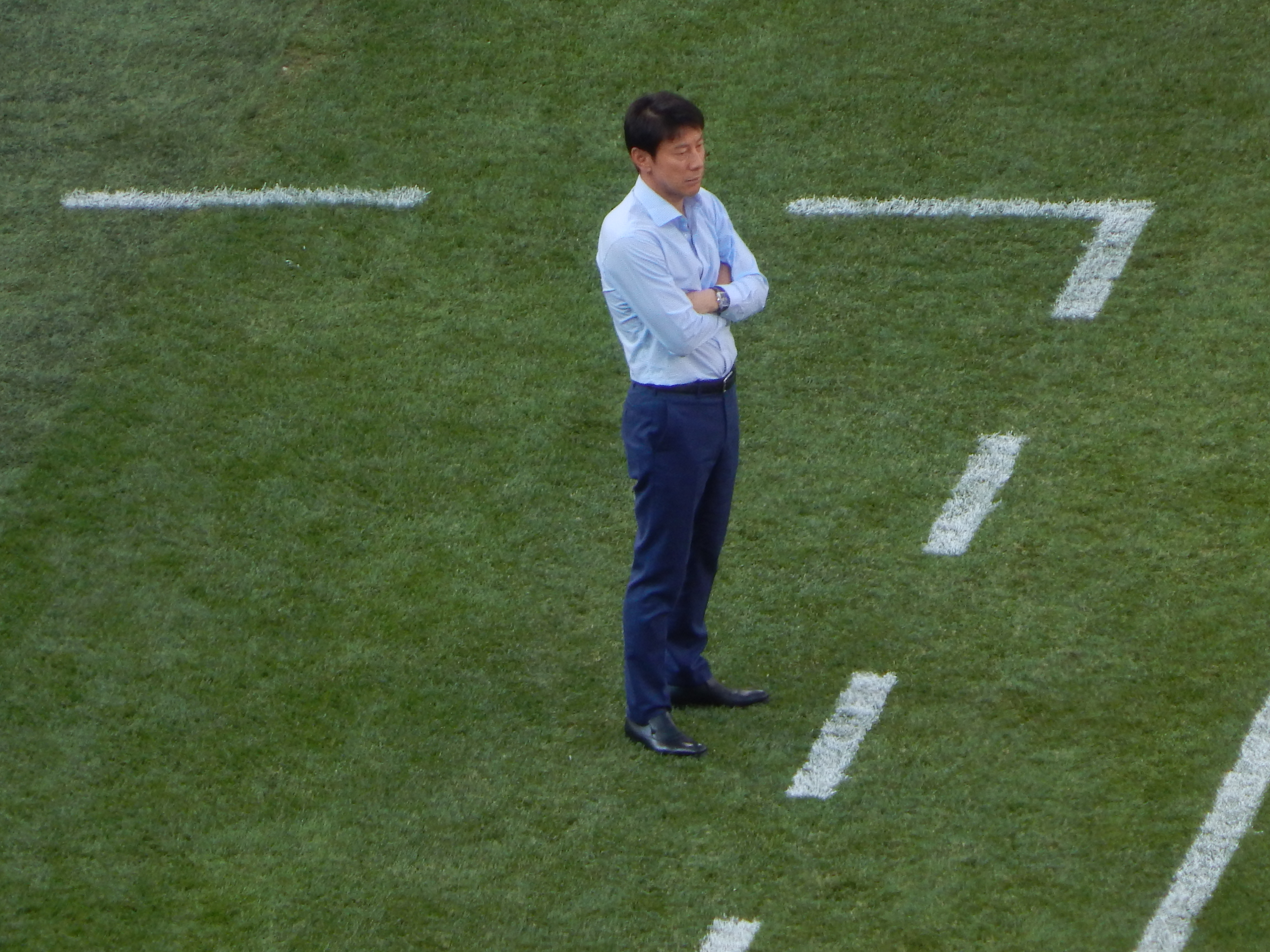
Shin during the 2018 FIFA World Cup match against Sweden

In August 2014, he became the assistant coach of the South Korea national team. Under Shin, South Korea reached the Asian Cup final for the first time in 27 years. South Korea's manager at that time was Uli Stielike, but the actual coaching role was performed by Shin, who took charge of the tactics and training of the team.

Shin also managed the South Korea under-23 team at the same time, and participated in the 2016 Summer Olympics. South Korea won their group by acquiring 7 points against Germany, Mexico, and Fiji, but they were surprisingly elimininated by Honduras in the quarter-finals.

On 22 November 2016, Shin was appointed manager of the South Korea under-20 team to prepare for the 2017 FIFA U-20 World Cup on home soil. Therefore, he left the senior team to concentrate on the under-20 team. At the World Cup, South Korea finished second in their group with 6 points and advanced to the knockout stage, but lost to Portugal in the round of 16.

After Shin left the South Korean senior team, Stielike made poor results in qualifiers of the 2018 FIFA World Cup and was eventually fired by the Korea Football Association. On 4 July 2017, Shin became the manager of the senior team to replace Stielike. In December, he won the 2017 EAFF E-1 Football Championship, beating arch-rivals Japan in the final fixture 4–1. Despite two goalless draws, South Korea under Shin also obtained qualification to the 2018 FIFA World Cup in Russia. They were drawn in the same group against Sweden, Mexico and defending champions Germany. South Korea lost 1–0 to Sweden and 2–1 to Mexico, but surprised everyone by defeating Germany 2–0.

=== Indonesia ===
On 28 December 2019, the Football Association of Indonesia (PSSI) confirmed the appointment of Shin as the Indonesian national team's manager, replacing dismissed Simon McMenemy. He was handed a 4-year contract, while he also became the first South Korean in Indonesia's managerial history.

==== 2021–2023: Regenerating the Team Garuda ====
Shin's start in Indonesia was not good with Indonesia losing 4–0 and 5–0 to Vietnam and United Arab Emirates, respectively, in the second round of 2022 World Cup qualification. After the World Cup qualifiers, he led Indonesia with an average squad age of 23.8 years to the final of the 2020 AFF Championship. In June 2022, he led Indonesia to qualify for the 2023 AFC Asian Cup, ending Indonesia's 16-year absence from the competition, following a 2–1 win against Kuwait and a thumping 7–0 victory against Nepal on the final matchday to clinch qualification.

Prior to 2023 AFC U-20 Asian Cup which scheduled to be held in March 2023, Shin's request to take a number of Persija Jakarta and Persib Bandung players was rejected by their managers, Thomas Doll and Luis Milla. The players were called up to attend a training camp to prepare for the second appearance of the national team in the tournament. Shin was absent from a virtual meeting with the Persija management, which was regretted by Doll. Nine of Doll's players were called and declined since they were competing for the league title.

Shin became the first coach that managed to lead Indonesia national teams in three age levels from senior, under-23, and under-20 to all qualify for the AFC Asian Cup in their respective levels, with the under-23 team qualifying for the AFC U-23 Asian Cup for the first time.

==== 2023 Asian Cup ====
In the 2023 AFC Asian Cup tournament, Shin brought up the youngest squad out of all 24 teams with an average age of 23.81 years. Indonesia first faced off against Iraq in a 3–1 loss. In the second match, Indonesia faced off against Southeast Asian rivals Vietnam and defeated them 1–0. It was the first victory against Vietnam in 7 years. In the last group stage match, Indonesia lost 3–1 to Asia's top-ranked team, Japan. Despite two losses in the group stage, Indonesia managed to advance to the round of 16 by finishing as one of the four best third-place groups. Shin was able to lead Indonesia to the knockout stage of the AFC Asian Cup for the first time in their history after their first appearance in 1996 AFC Asian Cup, thanks to Oman and Kyrgyzstan drew each other in group F. Indonesia faced off against Australia in the Round of 16 in a 4–0 loss.

==== 2024 U-23 Asian Cup and Olympic play-off ====
In April 2024, Indonesia participated at the 2024 AFC U-23 Asian Cup, making their debut in the competition. Indonesia were in Group B with Asia's powerhouses, Australia, Jordan and hosts Qatar. Despite a controversial 2–0 loss to Qatar, in which the referee seemed to be friendly toward the hosts, Indonesia managed to advance to the quarter-finals as group runners-up after winning 1–0 over Australia, and 4–1 over Jordan. After fulfilling the two targets set by PSSI which were to reach the knockout stages at both Asian Cup and U-23 Asian Cup, on 25 April, PSSI president Erick Thohir announced that Shin's contract was officially extended until 2027. Shin also faced his native South Korea in the quarter-finals, but defeated them 11–10 on penalties after a 2–2 draw for 120 minutes. He had three chances to lead Indonesia to the 2024 Summer Olympics, with the last two matches of the tournament and Afro-Asian play-off between fourth-placed teams left. However, Indonesia missed all three opportunities by losing 2–0 to Uzbekistan in the semi-finals, 2–1 to Iraq (after extra-time) in the third place match and 1–0 to Guinea in the Olympic qualifying play-off. They were dominated by the three opponents unlike in previous matches and failed to earn their first Olympic football berth since 1956. Shin was sent off for complaining strongly about the penalty awarded to Guinea for the second time during the last match.

==== 2026 World Cup qualification ====
At the continuation of the second round of 2026 FIFA World Cup qualifiers, where Indonesia previously lost 5–1 to Iraq and drew 1–1 with the Philippines in November 2023, they beat Vietnam again twice. They earned a 1–0 home win and a 3–0 away win over Vietnam on 21 and 26 March 2024, respectively, and the latter was their first away win over Vietnam since 2004. Finishing as Group G runners-up at the second round after a 2–0 loss to Iraq and a 2–0 win over the Philippines in June 2024, Indonesia became the only Southeast Asian nation among 18 qualified nations at the AFC third round.

Before the start of the third round, PSSI brought numerous naturalised players to the Indonesia national team. Drawn in the Group C with Japan, Australia, Saudi Arabia, Bahrain and China, Shin and the new squad got six points in six matches including a 2–0 win over Saudi Arabia. Indonesia was ranked third in the group with four matches left, having the possibility of advancing directly to World Cup finals or AFC fourth round.

On 6 January 2025, however, PSSI sacked him to appoint a European manager, who can communicate with naturalised players smoothly. His dismissal caused emotional reactions among the Indonesian and South Korean media, with his son, Shin Jae-won commented that PSSI "will regret this", this was compounded by the potential candidate for Shin's replacement coach, Patrick Kluivert, who was considered unclean due to a gambling scandal. On 11 January, Shin publicly expressed his gratitude for the support he received from the Indonesian people, and expressed his hope that Indonesia would qualify for the 2026 World Cup. Shin's son, Jae-won, said he hoped that with this dismissal, his father would take a break and return to South Korea.

=== Ulsan HD ===
On 5 August 2025, Shin signed with K League 1 club Ulsan HD, beginning to replace previous manager Kim Pan-gon. He defeated Jeju SK, winning his first match at Ulsan, but failed to bring a win in seven subsequent K League 1 matches. He was in conflict with Ulsan players due to his modes of communication and training. In an interview after an AFC Champions League Elite match on 1 October, he mentioned a "reshuffle of the squad" without consulting the club's executives, embarrassing them. Afterwards, an anonymous player spread a picture of Shin's golf bag which was in the club's bus and the spread was followed by the rumor about Shin's indolence. On 9 October, he was sacked 65 days after his appointment. After leaving the club, he denied the rumor and revealed the club's executives communicated with only players when he was in conflict with some veteran players. Lee Chung-yong pretended to swing a golf club when performing his goal celebration in the first match after Shin's dismissal, intensifying the controversy. Additionally, Jung Seung-hyun claimed if Shin, who assaulted him, did the same behavior at an Arabian club, Shin would be immediately sacked. About this, Shin explained he was glad to see his pupil Jung after a long time, so slapped Jung's cheek for a lark. Shin said he is sorry to Jung, if he offended Jung, but denied that it was an assault. The club and players stopped criticising Shin after Shin's explanations. Fans were also confused about whether Shin's act was able to be seen as an assault after watching a video of the situation. In July 2026, the Korea Football Association concluded that Shin assaulted his players, but they did not announce concrete explanations and the level of disciplinary action. The level of disciplinary action against Shin was a one-year suspension in South Korean football, and was made public by Persija Jakarta which he managed at the time.

=== Persija Jakarta ===
On 8 June 2026, Shin was officially announced as the new head coach of Persija Jakarta on a three-years contract. He became the first South Korean coach in Liga Indonesia history. Shin's first league match in charge was on 5 September, a 1–0 win at Borneo Samarinda where new signing Alexander Jeremejeff scored on his debut. A week later, on 12 September, he led the team to a 2–1 win over Persib Bandung in the Indonesian Derby. It was Persija's first win over their rivals since March 2023.

== Administrative career ==
On 9 April 2025, Shin was appointed vice-president of the Korea Football Association by president Chung Mong-gyu, along with Kim Byung-ji and Park Hang-seo.

== Personal life ==
Shin has two children, Shin Jae-won and Shin Jae-hyeok.

In Indonesia, he is widely known by his initial "STY".

Shin was appointed as an advertising model of Nongshim, a South Korean food company, and made a dance video to promote instant noodle "Nongshim Bulgogi" in Indonesia. The song and his dance in the video became an internet meme after attracting attention in South Korea and Indonesia.

Shin received a Golden Visa from the Indonesian government.

In 2026, Shin Tae-yong appeared as a parent panelist alongside his son, footballer Shin Jae-hyeok, on the tvN Story/E Channel dating program When Our Kids Fall in Love 2(내 새끼의 연애2), which aired from February to April 2026.

== Career statistics ==
=== Club ===
Appearances and goals by club, season and competition
Club	Season	League			National cup		League cup		Continental		Other		Total	
Club	Season	Division	Apps	Goals	Apps	Goals	Apps	Goals	Apps	Goals	Apps	Goals	Apps	Goals
Seongnam Ilhwa Chunma	1992	K League	18	7	—		7	3	—		—		25	10
Seongnam Ilhwa Chunma	1993	K League	28	5	—		5	1	—		—		33	6
Seongnam Ilhwa Chunma	1994	K League	23	7	—		6	1			—		29	8
Seongnam Ilhwa Chunma	1995	K League	26	6	—		7	0			2 (Note: Appearance(s) in K League Championship)	2	35	8
Seongnam Ilhwa Chunma	1996	K League	24	18			5	3			—		29	21
Seongnam Ilhwa Chunma	1997	K League	7	0			12	3			—		19	3
Seongnam Ilhwa Chunma	1998	K League	7	1			17	2	—		—		24	3
Seongnam Ilhwa Chunma	1999	K League	25	4			10	5	—		—		35	9
Seongnam Ilhwa Chunma	2000	K League	26	7			7	2			1	0	34	9
Seongnam Ilhwa Chunma	2001	K League	27	5			9	0			—		36	5
Seongnam Ilhwa Chunma	2002	K League	26	4			11	2			—		37	6
Seongnam Ilhwa Chunma	2003	K League	38	8	2	0	—				—		40	8
Seongnam Ilhwa Chunma	2004	K League	20	4	0	0	11	2			—		31	6
Seongnam Ilhwa Chunma	Total		295	76	2	0	107	24			3	2	407	102
Queensland Roar	2005–06	A-League	1	0	—		—		—		1 (Note: Appearance in A-League Pre-Season Challenge Cup)	0	2	0
Career total			296	76	2	0	107	24			4	2	409	102

=== International ===
Appearances and goals by national team and year
National team	Year	Apps	Goals
South Korea	1992	1	0
South Korea	1993	2	0
South Korea	1994	2	0
South Korea	1995	3	0
South Korea	1996	13	3
South Korea	1997	2	0
Career total		23	3

Results list South Korea's goal tally first.

List of international goals scored by Shin Tae-yong
No.	Date	Venue	Cap	Opponent	Score	Result	Competition
1	30 April 1996	Tel Aviv, Israel	13	Israel	3–0	5–4	Friendly
2	11 August 1996	Ho Chi Minh City, Vietnam	15	Vietnam	1–0	4–0	1996 AFC Asian Cup qualification
3	16 December 1996	Dubai, United Arab Emirates	21	Iran	2–1	2–6	1996 AFC Asian Cup

== Managerial statistics ==
As of match played 7 November 2026

Managerial record by team and tenure
Team	From	To	Record					Ref.
Team	From	To	Pld	W	D	L	Win %	Ref.
Seongnam Ilhwa Chunma	8 December 2008	7 December 2012	183	80	43	60	43.72	
South Korea (caretaker)	18 August 2014	8 September 2014	2	1	0	1	50.00	
South Korea U23	6 February 2015	31 December 2016	30	18	9	3	60.00	
South Korea U20	22 November 2016	3 July 2017	10	5	2	3	50.00	
South Korea	4 July 2017	31 July 2018	21	7	6	8	33.33	
Indonesia U20	1 January 2020	6 July 2023	29	11	7	11	37.93	
Indonesia U23	1 January 2020	5 January 2025	25	12	3	10	48.00	
Indonesia	1 January 2020	5 January 2025	63	27	15	21	42.86	
Ulsan HD	5 August 2025	9 October 2025	10	2	4	4	20.00	
Persija Jakarta	8 June 2026	Present	10	7	1	2	70.00	
Total			383	170	90	123	44.39	

== Honours ==
=== Player ===
Yeungnam University

- Korean President's Cup: 1991

Seongnam Ilhwa Chunma

- K League 1: 1993, 1994, 1995, 2001, 2002, 2003
- Korean FA Cup: 1999
- Korean League Cup: 1992, 2002, 2004
- Korean Super Cup: 2002
- Asian Club Championship: 1995
- Asian Super Cup: 1996
- Afro-Asian Club Championship: 1996
- A3 Champions Cup: 2004

Individual

- K League Rookie of the Year: 1992
- K League 1 Best XI: 1992, 1993, 1994, 1995, 1996, 2000, 2001, 2002, 2003
- K League All-Star: 1995, 2002, 2003, 2004
- K League 1 Most Valuable Player: 1995, 2001
- K League 1 top goalscorer: 1996
- K League 30th Anniversary Best XI: 2013
- K League Hall of Fame: 2023

=== Manager ===
Seongnam Ilhwa Chunma

- AFC Champions League: 2010
- Korean FA Cup: 2011

South Korea U23

- AFC U-23 Championship runner-up: 2016

South Korea

- EAFF Championship: 2017

Indonesia

- AFF Championship runner-up: 2020

Indonesia U23

- AFF U-23 Championship runner-up: 2023
- SEA Games bronze medal: 2021

Individual

- Korean FA Cup Best Manager: 2011
- K League All-Star: 2012
