= Jasenko Sabitović =

Croatian-born South Korean footballer (born 1973)

Jasenko Sabitović 이싸빅
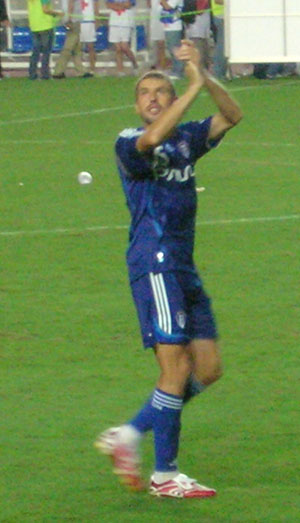
- Sabitović playing for Suwon Bluewings in 2007

Personal information
- Full name: Lee Savik
- Birth name: Jasenko Sabitović
- Date of birth: 29 March 1973 (age 53)
- Place of birth: Tuzla, SFR Yugoslavia
- Height: 1.85 m (6 ft 1 in)
- Position: Centre-back

Senior career*
Years	Team	Apps	(Gls)
1992–1994	Radnik Velika Gorica	30	(1)
1993–1994	→ Jahn Regensburg (loan)	14	(0)
1994–1997	NK Zagreb	58	(6)
1998–2002	Pohang Steelers	109	(4)
2003–2005	Ilhwa Chunma	56	(2)
2005–2007	Suwon Bluewings	31	(0)
2008	Chunnam Dragons	5	(0)
2009	Karlovac	12	(1)
Total		315	(14)

International career
1995	Croatia U21	6	(1)
- * Club domestic league appearances and goals

- Jasenko Sabitović
- Hangul: 이싸빅
- Hanja: 李싸빅
- RR: I Ssabik
- MR: I Ssabik

Jasenko Sabitović (Korean: 이싸빅; Korean pronunciation: [i.s͈a.bik̚]; Croatian pronunciation: [jâseːnko sabǐːtoʋit͡ɕ]; born 29 May 1973) is a former professional footballer who played as a centre-back. Born in Bosnia, he received his South Korean passport in 2004 and while playing there was known as Lee Savik.

== Club career ==
He began his playing career at NK Zagreb. Sabitović first arrived in South Korea in 1998, when he signed for the Pohang Steelers from NK Zagreb, a team in the Croatian First League.

After being released by Suwon Samsung Bluewings, rumours circulated that he would be heading to Africa, and this proved to be the case, as he was transferred to the Ghanaian football club Accra Hearts of Oak, although he was later transferred to Jeonnam Dragons.

He returned to Croatia to play for Karlovac in the First Football League.

== International career ==
Born in Tuzla, SR Bosnia and Herzegovina, SFR Yugoslavia, Sabitović played for the Croatia U21 national team because his mother is a Bosnian Croat. He won six international caps with the team in 1995. Because of this, he was eligible to play for Bosnia and Herzegovina, Croatia and South Korea.

== Honours ==
Seongnam Ilhwa Chunma

- K League 1: 2003

Suwon Samsung Bluewings

- Korean FA Cup runner-up: 2006

Pohang Steelers

- Korean FA Cup runner-up: 2001, 2002
