= Lee Kyung-chun =

South Korean footballer (born 1969)

Personal information
- Full name: Lee Kyung-chun
- Date of birth: 14 April 1969 (age 57)
- Height: 1.83 m (6 ft 0 in)
- Position: Defender

College career
Years	Team	Apps	(Gls)
1989–1991	Ajou University		

Senior career*
Years	Team	Apps	(Gls)
1992–1993	Daewoo Royals	15	(0)
1994	Chonbuk Buffalo	21	(2)
1995–2000	Jeonbuk Hyundai Motors	91	(1)
Total		127	(3)

International career
1996	South Korea U23	1 (Note: Appearance as an overage player in Summer Olympics)	(0)
1994	South Korea	3	(0)
- * Club domestic league appearances and goals as of 30 April 2010

Lee Kyung-chun (born 14 April 1969) is a former South Korean footballer. Lee played for Dawoo Royals, Chonbuk Buffalo, Jeonbuk Hyundai Motors in the K League. He also played as an over-aged player for South Korean under-23 team in the 1996 Summer Olympics.

== Honours ==
Jeonbuk Hyundai Motors

- Korean FA Cup: 2000

Individual

- K League All-Star: 1998
