= Mutamba Kabongo =

Democratic Republic of the Congo footballer

Personal information
- Full name: Mutamba Kabongo
- Date of birth: 9 December 1970 (age 55)
- Place of birth: DR Congo
- Height: 1.82 m (6 ft 0 in)
- Position: Defender

Senior career*
Years	Team	Apps	(Gls)
1995–1996	AS Bantous		
1997–2000	Anyang LG Cheetahs	59	(4)

International career
1996–2001	Zaire / Congo DR	6	(0)
Medal record
Representing DR Congo
Men's football
Africa Cup of Nations
Third place	1998 Burkina Faso
- * Club domestic league appearances and goals as of 15 August 2011

Mutamba Kabongo (born 9 December 1970) is a former footballer from the Democratic Republic of the Congo who played as a defender. He was an international for DR Congo and played at the 1996 African Cup of Nations and 1998 African Cup of Nations.

== Club career ==
He played for Anyang LG Cheetahs of the South Korean K League.

== Honours ==
DR Congo

- African Cup of Nations: 3rd place, 1998
