= Chung Jong-son =

South Korean footballer (born 1966)

Chung Jong-Son
Personal information
- Full name: Chung Jong-Son
- Date of birth: 20 March 1966 (age 60)
- Place of birth: South Korea
- Height: 1.74 m (5 ft 8 1/2 in)
- Position: Midfielder

Team information
- Current team: Eonnam High School

Senior career*
Years	Team	Apps	(Gls)
1985	POSCO Atoms	1	(0)
1989–1994	Hyundai Horang-i	137	(1)
1995–1997	Chonbuk Hyundai Dinos	61	(0)
1998	Anyang LG Cheetahs	12	(0)
Total		211	(1)

International career
1993–1994	South Korea	9	(0)

Managerial career
- 2001: Eonnam High School (Coach)
- 2002–: Eonnam High School
- * Club domestic league appearances and goals

Chung Jong-Son (Korean: 정종선, born 20 March 1966) is a South Korean former international footballer who played professionally as a midfielder for POSCO Atoms, Hyundai Horang-i, Jeonbuk Hyundai Dinos and Anyang LG Cheetahs. He represented South Korea at the 1994 FIFA World Cup.
