= Rogério Pinheiro =

Brazilian footballer (born 1972)

Personal information
- Full name: Rogério Pinheiro dos Santos
- Date of birth: April 21, 1972 (age 54)
- Place of birth: Angra dos Reis, Rio de Janeiro, Brazil
- Height: 1.84 m (6 ft 0 in)
- Position: Defender

Senior career*
Years	Team	Apps	(Gls)
1991–1994	Botafogo	28	(2)
1995	São Paulo	12	(0)
1996	Fluminense	0	(0)
1996	Atlético Mineiro	23	(2)
1997–2001	São Paulo	53	(4)
2002	Portuguesa	0	(0)
2002–2003	Vasco da Gama	13	(0)
2003–2005	Pohang Steelers	74	(5)
2006–2008	Gyeongnam FC	66	(3)
- * Club domestic league appearances and goals

Rogerio Pinheiro dos Santos, known as Rogério Pinheiro in the K-League, (born: April 21, 1972) is a former Brazilian footballer who plays as a defender.

His Korean football career started in 2003. In 2003, Pohang Steelers brought him to the K-League. And in 2006, he moved to Gyeongnam FC.

He previously played domestically for Botafogo FR, São Paulo FC, Fluminense FC, Atlético Mineiro, Portuguesa and CR Vasco da Gama.
