= Lee Yong-bal =

South Korean footballer (born 1973)

Lee Yong-Bal
Personal information
- Full name: Lee Yong-Bal
- Date of birth: 15 March 1973 (age 53)
- Place of birth: South Korea
- Position: Goalkeeper

Team information
- Current team: Yonsei University (coach)

Senior career*
Years	Team	Apps	(Gls)
1994–2001	Yukong Elephants / Bucheon SK	96	(1)
2002–2006	Jeonbuk Hyundai	86	(0)
2006	Gyeongnam FC	0	(0)

Managerial career
- Yonsei University (coach)
- * Club domestic league appearances and goals

Lee Yong-Bal (Korean: 이용발; born 15 March 1973) is a South Korean retired footballer who played as a goalkeeper.
