= 2001 K League =

POSCO K League
- Season: 2001
- Dates: 17 June – 28 October 2001
- Champions: Seongnam Ilhwa Chunma (4th title)
- Champions League: Seongnam Ilhwa Chunma; Daejeon Citizen
- Matches played: 135
- Goals scored: 310 (2.3 per match)
- Best Player: Shin Tae-yong
- Top goalscorer: Sandro Cardoso (13 goals)

The 2001 K League was the 19th season of K League. It kicked off on June 17, and was finished on 28 October.

== League table ==
Pos	Team	Pld	W	D	L	GF	GA	GD	Pts	Qualification
1	Seongnam Ilhwa Chunma (C)	27	11	12	4	35	20	+15	45	Qualification for the Champions League
2	Anyang LG Cheetahs	27	11	10	6	30	23	+7	43	
3	Suwon Samsung Bluewings	27	12	5	10	40	35	+5	41	
4	Busan I'Cons	27	10	11	6	38	33	+5	41	
5	Pohang Steelers	27	10	8	9	28	29	−1	38	
6	Ulsan Hyundai Horang-i	27	10	6	11	34	39	−5	36	
7	Bucheon SK	27	7	14	6	29	29	0	35	
8	Jeonnam Dragons	27	6	10	11	28	33	−5	28	
9	Jeonbuk Hyundai Motors	27	5	10	12	23	33	−10	25	
10	Daejeon Citizen	27	5	10	12	25	36	−11	25	Qualification for the Champions League (Note: Qualified as champions of the FA Cup.)

Source: RSSSF
(C) Champions

== Top scorers ==
Rank	Player	Club	Goals	Apps
1	(Brazil) Sandro Cardoso	Suwon Samsung Bluewings	13	22
2	(Brazil) Paulinho	Ulsan Hyundai Horang-i	11	22
2	(South Korea) Woo Sung-yong	Busan I'Cons	11	22
2	(South Korea) Seo Jung-won	Suwon Samsung Bluewings	11	25
5	(Federal Republic of Yugoslavia) Saša Drakulić	Seongnam Ilhwa Chunma	10	25
6	(South Korea) Park Jung-hwan	Anyang LG Cheetahs	9	16
6	(Brazil) César	Jeonnam Dragons	9	26
6	(South Korea) Nam Ki-il	Bucheon SK	9	27
9	(Brazil) Tico Mineiro	Jeonnam Dragons	8	23
9	(North Macedonia) Goran Petreski	Pohang Steelers	8	25
9	(Brazil) Ricardo Campos	Anyang LG Cheetahs	8	25
9	(South Korea) Kim Do-hoon	Jeonbuk Hyundai Motors	8	26

== Awards ==
=== Main awards ===
Award	Winner	Club
Most Valuable Player	(South Korea) Shin Tae-yong	Seongnam Ilhwa Chunma
Top goalscorer	(Brazil) Sandro Cardoso	Suwon Samsung Bluewings
Top assist provider	(Federal Republic of Yugoslavia) Zoran Urumov	Busan I'Cons
Rookie of the Year	(South Korea) Song Chong-gug	Busan I'Cons
Manager of the Year	(South Korea) Cha Kyung-bok	Seongnam Ilhwa Chunma
Special Award	(South Korea) Shin Eui-son	Anyang LG Cheetahs
Special Award	(South Korea) Lee Yong-bal	Bucheon SK
Best Referee	(South Korea) Kim Jin-ok	—
Best Assistant Referee	(South Korea) Kim Gye-soo	—

=== Best XI ===
Position	Winner	Club
Goalkeeper	(South Korea) Shin Eui-son	Anyang LG Cheetahs
Defenders	(Federal Republic of Yugoslavia) Zoran Urumov	Busan I'Cons
Defenders	(South Korea) Kim Hyun-soo	Seongnam Ilhwa Chunma
Defenders	(South Korea) Kim Yong-hee	Seongnam Ilhwa Chunma
Defenders	(South Korea) Lee Young-pyo	Anyang LG Cheetahs
Midfielders	(South Korea) Shin Tae-yong	Seongnam Ilhwa Chunma
Midfielders	(South Korea) Seo Jung-won	Suwon Samsung Bluewings
Midfielders	(South Korea) Song Chong-gug	Busan I'Cons
Midfielders	(South Korea) Nam Ki-il	Bucheon SK
Forwards	(South Korea) Woo Sung-yong	Busan I'Cons
Forwards	(Brazil) Sandro Cardoso	Suwon Samsung Bluewings

== See also ==
- 2001 Korean League Cup
- 2001 Korean FA Cup
