= 2003 K League =

Football league season

Samsung Hauzen K League
- Season: 2003
- Dates: 23 March – 16 November 2003
- Champions: Seongnam Ilhwa Chunma (6th title)
- Champions League: Seongnam Ilhwa Chunma; Jeonbuk Hyundai Motors
- Matches played: 264
- Goals scored: 675 (2.56 per match)
- Best Player: Kim Do-hoon
- Top goalscorer: Kim Do-hoon (28 goals)

The 2003 K League was the 21st season of the K League. It kicked off on March 23, and was finished on 16 November.

== League table ==
Pos	Team	Pld	W	D	L	GF	GA	GD	Pts	Qualification
1	Seongnam Ilhwa Chunma (C)	44	27	10	7	85	50	+35	91	Qualification for the Champions League
2	Ulsan Hyundai Horang-i	44	20	13	11	63	44	+19	73	
3	Suwon Samsung Bluewings	44	19	15	10	59	46	+13	72	
4	Jeonnam Dragons	44	17	20	7	65	48	+17	71	
5	Jeonbuk Hyundai Motors	44	18	15	11	72	58	+14	69	Qualification for the Champions League (Note: Qualified as champions of the FA Cup.)
6	Daejeon Citizen	44	18	11	15	50	51	−1	65	
7	Pohang Steelers	44	17	13	14	53	46	+7	64	
8	Anyang LG Cheetahs	44	14	14	16	69	68	+1	56	
9	Busan I'Cons	44	13	10	21	41	71	−30	49	
10	Gwangju Sangmu Bulsajo	44	13	7	24	41	60	−19	46	
11	Daegu FC	44	7	16	21	38	60	−22	37	
12	Bucheon SK	44	3	12	29	39	73	−34	21	

Source: RSSSF
(C) Champions

== Top scorers ==
Rank	Player	Club	Goals	Apps
1	(South Korea) Kim Do-hoon	Seongnam Ilhwa Chunma	28	40
2	(Brazil) Dodô	Ulsan Hyundai Horang-i	27	44
2	(Brazil) Magno Alves	Jeonbuk Hyundai Motors	27	44
4	(Brazil) Itamar	Jeonnam Dragons	23	34
5	(Portugal) Edmilson	Jeonbuk Hyundai Motors	17	39
6	(South Korea) Shin Byung-ho	Jeonnam Dragons	16	42
7	(South Korea) Woo Sung-yong	Pohang Steelers	15	40
8	(Brazil) Nadson	Suwon Samsung Bluewings	14	18
8	(Brazil) Tuta	Suwon Samsung Bluewings	14	31
10	(England) Andy Cooke	Busan I'Cons	13	22

== Awards ==
=== Main awards ===
Award	Winner	Club
Most Valuable Player	(South Korea) Kim Do-hoon	Seongnam Ilhwa Chunma
Top goalscorer	(South Korea) Kim Do-hoon	Seongnam Ilhwa Chunma
Top assist provider	(Portugal) Edmilson	Jeonbuk Hyundai Motors
Rookie of the Year	(South Korea) Jung Jo-gook	Anyang LG Cheetahs
Manager of the Year	(South Korea) Cha Kyung-bok	Seongnam Ilhwa Chunma

=== Best XI ===
Position	Winner	Club
Goalkeeper	(South Korea) Seo Dong-myung	Ulsan Hyundai Horang-i
Defenders	(South Korea) Choi Jin-cheul	Jeonbuk Hyundai Motors
Defenders	(South Korea) Kim Tae-young	Jeonnam Dragons
Defenders	(South Korea) Kim Hyun-soo	Seongnam Ilhwa Chunma
Defenders	(Brazil) Rogério Pinheiro	Pohang Steelers
Midfielders	(South Korea) Shin Tae-yong	Seongnam Ilhwa Chunma
Midfielders	(South Korea) Lee Seong-nam	Seongnam Ilhwa Chunma
Midfielders	(South Korea) Lee Kwan-woo	Daejeon Citizen
Midfielders	(South Korea) Kim Nam-il	Jeonnam Dragons
Forwards	(South Korea) Kim Do-hoon	Seongnam Ilhwa Chunma
Forwards	(Brazil) Magno Alves	Jeonbuk Hyundai Motors

== See also ==
- 2003 Korean FA Cup
