= South Korea national under-23 football team results (2020–present) =

- Win Draw Loss

This article is the list of international matches of the South Korea national under-23 football team from 2020 to present.

== Results by year ==
Year	Pld	W	D	L	Win %
2020	8	6	1	1	75.00
2021	11	7	1	3	63.64
2022	7	3	2	2	42.86
2023	16	14	0	2	87.50
2024	13	6	3	4	46.15
2025	13	6	2	5	46.15
2026	18	10	4	4	55.56
Total	86	52	13	21	60.47

== Under-23 matches ==
=== 2020 ===
9 January 2020 AFC U-23 Championship (Group C)	South Korea	1–0	China	Songkhla, Thailand
20:15	Lee Dong-jun 90+3'	Report		Stadium: Tinsulanon Stadium; Attendance: 6,000; Referee: Mohammed Abdulla Hassan Mohamed (United Arab Emirates)

12 January 2020 AFC U-23 Championship (Group C)	Iran	1–2	South Korea	Songkhla, Thailand
17:15	Shekari 54'	Report	Lee Dong-jun 22'; Cho Gue-sung 35'	Stadium: Tinsulanon Stadium; Attendance: 5,855; Referee: Adham Makhadmeh (Jordan)

15 January 2020 AFC U-23 Championship (Group C)	Uzbekistan	1–2	South Korea	Rangsit, Thailand
17:15	Abdixolikov 21'	Report	Oh Se-hun 5', 71'	Stadium: Thammasat Stadium; Referee: Hiroyuki Kimura (Japan)

19 January 2020 AFC U-23 Championship (Quarter-finals)	South Korea	2–1	Jordan	Rangsit, Thailand
17:15	Cho Gue-sung 15'; Lee Dong-gyeong 90+5'	Report	Al-Naimat 75'	Stadium: Thammasat Stadium; Referee: Abdulrahman Al-Jassim (Qatar)

22 January 2020 AFC U-23 Championship (Semi-finals)	Australia	0–2	South Korea	Rangsit, Thailand
20:15		Report	Kim Dae-won 56'; Lee Dong-gyeong 76'	Stadium: Thammasat Stadium; Referee: Nawaf Shukralla (Bahrain)

26 January 2020 AFC U-23 Championship (Final)	South Korea	1–0 (a.e.t.)	Saudi Arabia	Bangkok, Thailand
19:30	Jeong Tae-wook 114'	Report		Stadium: Rajamangala Stadium; Referee: Chris Beath (Australia)

12 November Friendly	Egypt	0–0	South Korea	Cairo, Egypt
20:00 UTC+2		Report		Stadium: Cairo International Stadium; Referee: Mahmoud El Banna (Egypt)

14 November Friendly	Brazil	3–1	South Korea	Cairo, Egypt
15:00 UTC+2	Cunha 42'; Rodrygo 61'; Neres 73'	Report	Lee Dong-gyeong 7'	Stadium: Cairo International Stadium; Referee: Ibrahim Nour El Din (Egypt)

=== 2021 ===
12 June Friendly	South Korea	3–1	Ghana	Seogwipo, South Korea
	Lee Sang-min 18'; Lee Seung-mo 59'; Cho Gue-sung 66'	Report	Obeng 76'	Stadium: Jeju World Cup Stadium; Attendance: 2,532; Referee: Chae Sang-hyub (Korea)

15 June Friendly	South Korea	2–1	Ghana	Seogwipo, South Korea
	Jeong Woo-yeong 41'; Lee Dong-jun 65'	Report	Barnes 51'	Stadium: Jeju World Cup Stadium; Attendance: 2,337; Referee: Choi Hyun-jae (Korea)

13 July Friendly	South Korea	2–2	Argentina	Yongin, South Korea
	Lee Dong-gyeong 35'; Um Won-sang 90+2'	Report	Mac Allister 12'; Vaenzuela 55'	Stadium: Yongin Mireu Stadium; Attendance: 0 Referee: Kim Woo-sung (South Korea)

16 July Friendly	South Korea	1–2	France	Seoul, South Korea
	Kwon Chang-hoon 63' (pen.)	Report	Kolo Muani 84'; Mbuku 89'	Stadium: Seoul World Cup Stadium; Attendance: 0 Referee: Kim Jong-hyeok (South Korea)

22 July 2020 Summer Olympics (Group B)	New Zealand	1–0	South Korea	Kashima, Japan
17:00 UTC+9	Wood 70'	Report		Stadium: Kashima Stadium; Referee: Victor Gomes (South Africa)

25 July 2020 Summer Olympics (Group B)	Romania	0–4	South Korea	Kashima, Japan
20:00 UTC+9		Report	Marin 27' (o.g.); Um Won-sang 59'; Lee Kang-in 84' (pen.), 90'	Stadium: Kashima Stadium; Referee: Jesús Valenzuela (Venezuela)

28 July 2020 Summer Olympics (Group B)	South Korea	6–0	Honduras	Yokohama, Japan
17:30 UTC+9	Hwang Ui-jo 12' (pen.), 45+5', 52' (pen.); Won Du-jae 19' (pen.); Kim Jin-ya 64'; Lee Kang-in 82'	Report		Stadium: International Stadium Yokohama; Attendance: 0 Referee: Georgi Kabakov (Bulgaria)

31 July 2020 Summer Olympics (Quarter-finals)	South Korea	3–6	Mexico	Yokohama, Japan
20:00 UTC+9	Lee Dong-gyeong 20', 51'; Hwang Ui-jo 90+1'	Report	Martín 12', 54'; Romo 30'; Córdova 39' (pen.), 63'; Aguirre 84'	Stadium: International Stadium Yokohama; Attendance: 0 Referee: Orel Grinfeld (Israel)

25 October 2022 AFC U-23 Asian Cup (Qualification)	South Korea	3–0	Philippines	Jalan Besar, Singapore
18:00 UTC+9	Lee Kyu-hyuk 51'; Go Jae-hyun 72'; Park Jeong-in 89'	Report		Stadium: Jalan Besar Stadium; Attendance: 400; Referee: Yudai Yamamoto (Japan)

28 October 2022 AFC U-23 Asian Cup (Qualification)	Timor-Leste	0–6	South Korea	Jalan Besar, Singapore
18:00 UTC+9		Report	Park Jeong-in 29', 32', 49'; Choi Jun 31'; Oh Hyun-gyu 82'; Kim Se-yun 87'	Stadium: Jalan Besar Stadium; Attendance: 166; Referee: Ngô Duy Lân (Vietnam)

31 October 2022 AFC U-23 Asian Cup (Qualification)	South Korea	5–1	Singapore	Jalan Besar, Singapore
21:30 UTC+9	Kim Chan 3'; Cho Sang-jun 6'; Mahler 25' (o.g.); Park Jeong-in 40'; Choi Jun 52'	Report	Adam 57'	Stadium: Jalan Besar Stadium; Attendance: 993; Referee: Hussein Abo Yehia (Lebanon)

=== 2022 ===
2 June 2022 AFC U-23 Asian Cup (Group C)	South Korea	4–1	Malaysia	Tashkent, Uzbekistan
18:00 UTC+5	Lee Sang-min 31'; Kim Tae-hwan 48'; Cho Young-wook 88', 90+2'	Report	Ajmal 83'	Stadium: Lokomotiv Stadium; Attendance: 290; Referee: Saoud Al-Athbah (Qatar)

5 June 2022 AFC U-23 Asian Cup (Group C)	Vietnam	1–1	South Korea	Tashkent, Uzbekistan
18:00 UTC+5	Vũ Tiến Long 83'	Report	Cho Young-wook 64'	Stadium: Lokomotiv Stadium; Attendance: 255; Referee: Ahmad Alali (Kuwait)

8 June 2022 AFC U-23 Asian Cup (Group C)	South Korea	1–0	Thailand	Tashkent, Uzbekistan
18:00 UTC+5	Go Jae-hyun 35'	Report		Stadium: Pakhtakor Stadium; Attendance: 350; Referee: Salman Ahmad Falahi (Qatar)

12 June 2022 AFC U-23 Asian Cup (Quarter-finals)	South Korea	0–3	Japan	Tashkent, Uzbekistan
18:00 UTC+5		Live Report; Stats Report	Y. Suzuki 22', 80'; Hosoya 65'	Stadium: Pakhtakor Stadium; Attendance: 529; Referee: Hanna Hattab (Syria)

26 September Friendly	South Korea	1–1	Uzbekistan	Hwaseong, South Korea
20:00 UTC+9	Cho Hyun-taek 85'	Report	Ruslan Jiyanov 49'	Stadium: Hwaseong Stadium; Attendance: 5,124; Referee: Chae Sang-hyeop (South Korea)

17 November Friendly	United Arab Emirates	2–1	South Korea	Dubai, United Arab Emirates
19:30 UTC+4	Al-Maazmi 18' (pen.); Faraj Abdulla 59'	Report	Kang Hyun-muk 7'	Stadium: Emirates Stadium; Attendance: 0 Referee: Abdullah Suhail (United Arab Emirates)

20 November Friendly	United Arab Emirates	0–2	South Korea	Dubai, United Arab Emirates
19:30 UTC+4		Report	An Jae-jun 11'; Paik Sang-hoon 56'	Stadium: Emirates Stadium; Attendance: 0 Referee: Saif Al-Messabi (United Arab Emirates)

=== 2023 ===
22 March Qatar International Friendship Tournament	South Korea	3–0	Oman	Doha, Qatar
20:30 UTC+3	Eom Ji-sung 8'; Kim Sin-jin 33'; An Jae-jun 76'	Report		Stadium: Thani bin Jassim Stadium; Attendance: 0 Referee: Abdulhadi Al-Ruwaili (Qatar)

25 March Qatar International Friendship Tournament	Iraq	0–1	South Korea	Doha, Qatar
20:30 UTC+3		Report	Goh Young-joon 89'	Stadium: Suheim bin Hamad Stadium; Attendance: 0 Referee: Khalid Al-Nabit (Qatar)

28 March Qatar International Friendship Tournament	South Korea	3–0	United Arab Emirates	Doha, Qatar
20:30 UTC+3	An Jae-jun 58'; Hong Si-hoo 79', 86'	Report		Stadium: Abdullah bin Khalifa Stadium; Attendance: 0 Referee: Abdulrahman Al-Jassim (Qatar)

15 June Friendly	China	1–3	South Korea	Zhejiang, China
18:00 UTC+8	Xu Haoyang 63'	Report	Um Won-sang 51', 53'; Jeong Woo-yeong 60'	Stadium: Jinhua Sports Centre Stadium; Referee: Wang Di (China)

19 June Friendly	China	1–0	South Korea	Zhejiang, China
19:30 UTC+8	Sun Qinhan 45'	Report		Stadium: Jinhua Sports Centre Stadium; Attendance: 24,468; Referee: Jin Jingyuan (China)

6 September Friendly	South Korea	0–2	Qatar	Changwon, South Korea
20:00 UTC+9		Report	Al-Rawi 38'; Al-Abdullah 67'	Stadium: Changwon Football Center; Attendance: 4,352; Referee: Abdullah Jamali (Kuwait)

9 September 2024 AFC U-23 Asian Cup (Qualification)	South Korea	1–0	Kyrgyzstan	Changwon, South Korea
20:00 UTC+9	Hong Yun-sang 3'	Report		Stadium: Changwon Football Center; Attendance: 7,021; Referee: Zhang Lei (China)

12 September 2024 AFC U-23 Asian Cup (Qualification)	South Korea	3–0	Myanmar	Changwon, South Korea
20:00 UTC+9	Paik Sang-hoon 5'; Jeon Byung-kwan 85'; Oh Jae-hyeok 90+2'	Report		Stadium: Changwon Football Center; Attendance: 3,838; Referee: Majed Al-Shamrani (Saudi Arabia)

19 September 2022 Asian Games (Group E)	Kuwait	0–9	South Korea	Jinhua, China
19:30 UTC+8		Report	Jeong Woo-yeong 3', 45', 48'; Cho Young-wook 19', 74'; Paik Seung-ho 44'; Um Won-sang 52'; Park Jae-yong 80'; An Jae-jun 90+6'	Stadium: Jinhua Stadium; Attendance: 2,936; Referee: Hasan Akrami (Iran)

21 September 2022 Asian Games (Group E)	South Korea	4–0	Thailand	Jinhua, China
19:30 UTC+8	Hong Hyun-seok 15'; An Jae-jun 20'; Um Won-sang 39'; Lee Jae-ik 45+1'	Report		Stadium: Jinhua Stadium; Attendance: 3,166; Referee: Ahmad Yacoub Ibrahim (Jordan)

24 September 2022 Asian Games (Group E)	South Korea	3–0	Bahrain	Jinhua, China
19:30 UTC+8	Lee Han-beom 61'; Paik Seung-ho 74'; Goh Young-jun 84'	Report		Stadium: Jinhua Stadium; Referee: Yousif Saeed Hasan (Iraq)

27 September 2022 Asian Games (Round of 16)	South Korea	5–1	Kyrgyzstan	Jinhua, China
19:30 UTC+8	Paik Seung-ho 11' (pen.); Jeong Woo-yeong 12', 74' (pen.); Cho Young-wook 79'; Hong Hyun-seok 85'	Report	Maksat Alygulov 28'	Stadium: Jinhua Stadium; Attendance: 18,393; Referee: Alex King (Australia)

1 October 2022 Asian Games (Quarter-finals)	China	0–2	South Korea	Hangzhou, China
20:00 UTC+8		Report	Hong Hyun-seok 18'; Song Min-kyu 35'	Stadium: Huanglong Sports Centre Stadium; Attendance: 38,158; Referee: Qasim Al-Hatmi (Oman)

4 October 2022 Asian Games (Semi-finals)	South Korea	2–1	Uzbekistan	Hangzhou, China
20:00 UTC+8	Jeong Woo-yeong 3', 38'	Report	Jaloliddinov 25'	Stadium: Huanglong Sports Centre Stadium; Attendance: 38,019; Referee: Ammar Ashkanani (Kuwait)

7 October 2022 Asian Games (Final)	South Korea	2–1	Japan	Hangzhou, China
20:00 UTC+8	Jeong Woo-yeong 27'; Cho Young-wook 56'	Report	Uchino 2'	Stadium: Hangzhou Sports Park Stadium; Attendance: 68,018; Referee: Ammar Mahfoodh (Bahrain)

20 November Friendly	France	0–3	South Korea	Le Havre, France
18:30 UTC+1			Jeong Sang-bin 70', 79'; Hong Yun-sang 90+4'	Stadium: Stade Océane

=== 2024 ===
20 March 2024 WAFF U-23 Championship (Quarter-finals)	South Korea	1–0	Thailand	Hofuf, Saudi Arabia
20:00 UTC+3	Cho Hyun-taek 45+1'	Report		Stadium: Prince Abdullah bin Jalawi Stadium; Attendance: 100; Referee: Alaeddin Sheikh Ahmad (Lebanon)

23 March 2024 WAFF U-23 Championship (Semi-finals)	Saudi Arabia	0–1	South Korea	Al Mubarraz, Saudi Arabia
23:00 UTC+3		Report	Eom Ji-sung 41'	Stadium: Al Fateh Stadium; Attendance: 1,500; Referee: Saad Ahmed (Egypt)

26 March 2024 WAFF U-23 Championship (Final)	Australia	2–2 (3–4 p)	South Korea	Al Mubarraz, Saudi Arabia
23:00 UTC+3	A. Kuol 11', 72'	Report	Lee Young-jun 26'; Kang Seong-jin 62'	Stadium: Al Fateh Stadium
	Penalties
	A. Kuol (penalty scored); Italiano (penalty scored); D'Arrigo (penalty scored); J. Hollman (penalty missed); G. Kuol (penalty missed)		(penalty scored) Lee Tae-seok; (penalty scored) Lee Kang-hee; (penalty scored) An Jae-jun; (penalty scored) Seo Myung-guan

9 April Friendly	Saudi Arabia	1–0	South Korea	Abu Dhabi, United Arab Emirates
	Thakri 72'	Report		Stadium: Al Nahyan Stadium

16 April 2024 AFC U-23 Asian Cup (Group B)	South Korea	1–0	United Arab Emirates	Qatar
	Lee Young-jun 90+4'	Report		Attendance: Abdullah bin Khalifa Stadium, Doha; Referee: Rustam Lutfullin (Uzbekistan)

19 April 2024 AFC U-23 Asian Cup (Group B)	China	0–2	South Korea	Qatar
		Report	Lee Young-jun 34', 69'	Stadium: Abdullah bin Khalifa Stadium, Doha; Referee: Mohammed Al-Shammari (Qatar)

22 April 2024 AFC U-23 Asian Cup (Group B)	Japan	0–1	South Korea	Al Rayyan, Qatar
16:00 UTC+3		Report	Kim Min-woo 75'	Stadium: Jassim Bin Hamad Stadium; Referee: Majed Al-Shamrani (Saudi Arabia)

25 April 2024 AFC U-23 Asian Cup (Quarter-finals)	South Korea	2–2 (a.e.t.) (10–11 p)	Indonesia	Doha, Qatar
20:30 UTC+3	Komang 45' (o.g.); Jeong Sang-bin 84'	Report	Struick 15', 45+3'	Stadium: Abdullah bin Khalifa Stadium; Referee: Shaun Evans (Australia)
	Penalties
	Kim Min-woo (penalty scored); Lee Kang-hee (penalty scored); Hwang Jae-won (penalty scored); Paik Sang-hoon (penalty scored); Byun Joon-soo (penalty scored); Kang Sang-yoon (penalty missed); Jeong Sang-bin (penalty scored); Hong Yun-sang (penalty scored); Cho Hyun-taek (penalty scored); Baek Jong-bum (penalty scored); Kim Min-woo (penalty scored); Lee Kang-hee (penalty missed)		(penalty scored) Sananta; (penalty scored) Arhan; (penalty scored) Struick; (penalty scored) Marselino; (penalty scored) Hubner; (penalty missed) Arkhan; (penalty scored) Sroyer; (penalty scored) Ridho; (penalty scored) Ferarri; (penalty scored) Ernando; (penalty scored) Sananta; (penalty scored) Arhan

3 June 2024 Maurice Revello Tournament	South Korea	0–2	Saudi Arabia	Vitrolles, France
14:00 UTC+2		Report	Al-Zaid 80'; Al-Asmari 90+3'	Stadium: Stade Jules-Ladoumègue; Referee: Veronika Bernatskaia (Kyrgyzstan)

7 June 2024 Maurice Revello Tournament	France	1–0	South Korea	Aubagne, France
17:30 UTC+2	Virginius 40'	Report		Stadium: Stade de Lattre-de-Tassigny; Referee: Susana Corella (Ecuador)

11 June 2024 Maurice Revello Tournament	South Korea	0–0 (3–5 p)	Mexico	Fos-sur-Mer, France
14:00 UTC+2		Report		Stadium: Stade Parsemain; Referee: Antsino Twanyanyukwa (Namibia)
	Penalties
	Jung Sung-woo (penalty scored); Jo Jin-ho (penalty missed); Moon Seong-woo (penalty scored); Ahn Jae-min (penalty scored)		(penalty scored) Alcántar; (penalty scored) Ambríz; (penalty scored) Monroy; (penalty scored) J. Rodríguez; (penalty scored) Álvarez

=== 2025 ===
20 March CFA Team China 2025	South Korea	1–1	Vietnam	Yancheng, China
14:30 UTC+8	Kim Woo-bin 90+5'	Report	Nguyễn Thanh Nhàn 53'	Stadium: Yancheng Sports Center Stadium

23 March CFA Team China 2025	China	1–0	South Korea	Yancheng, China
14:30 UTC+8	Liu Haofan 85'			Stadium: Yancheng Sports Center Stadium

25 March CFA Team China 2025	South Korea	3–1	Uzbekistan	Yancheng, China
14:30 UTC+8	Hwang In-taek 27'; Lee Seung-won 73' (pen.); Moon Min-seo 90+5'		Turdimurodov 90+3'	Stadium: Yancheng Sports Center Stadium

5 June Friendly	South Korea	0–0	Australia	Yongin, South Korea
19:00 UTC+9		Report		Stadium: Yongin Mireu Stadium; Attendance: 2,135; Referee: Kim Woo-sung (South Korea)

9 June Friendly	South Korea	0–2	Australia	Siheung, South Korea
13:00 UTC+9		Report	Kuol 6'; Lopane 21'	Stadium: Jeongwang Stadium; Attendance: 0

3 September 2026 AFC U-23 Asian Cup (Qualification)	South Korea	5–0	Macau	Sidoarjo, Indonesia
15:30 UTC+7	Jeong Jae-sang 14', 49' (pen.); Park Seung-ho 45+4'; Kang Seong-jin 58'; Seo Jae-min 88'	Report		Stadium: Gelora Delta Stadium; Attendance: 106

6 September 2026 AFC U-23 Asian Cup (Qualification)	Laos	0–7	South Korea	Sidoarjo, Indonesia
15:30 UTC+7		Report	Jung Ji-hun 44'; Lee Kyu-dong 45+4'; Cho Sang-hyeok 49', 60', 90+2'; Park Seung-ho 69' (pen.); Hwang Do-yoon 70'	Stadium: Gelora Delta Stadium; Attendance: 249

9 September 2026 AFC U-23 Asian Cup (Qualification)	South Korea	1–0	Indonesia	Sidoarjo, Indonesia
19:30 UTC+7	Hwang Do-yoon 6'	Report		Stadium: Gelora Delta Stadium

10 October Friendly	Saudi Arabia	4–0	South Korea	Al-Ahsa, Saudi Arabia
16:30 UTC+3	Al-Aliwa 40', 61'; Al-Julaydan 49'; Al-Subiani 64'	Report		Stadium: Prince Abdullah bin Jalawi Stadium

14 October Friendly	Saudi Arabia	2–0	South Korea	Al-Ahsa, Saudi Arabia
16:30 UTC+3	Al-Nemer 45' (pen.); Abdullah 79' (pen.)	Report		Stadium: Prince Abdullah bin Jalawi Stadium

12 November 2025 Panda Cup	South Korea	2–0	Uzbekistan	Chengdu, China
15:30 UTC+8	Jung Seung-bae 56'; Kim Myung-jun 88'	Report		Stadium: Shuangliu Sports Centre

15 November 2025 Panda Cup	China	2–0	South Korea	Chengdu, China
19:35 UTC+8	Behram Abduweli 71', 81'	Report		Stadium: Shuangliu Sports Centre; Attendance: 10,089; Referee: Tang Shunqi (China)

18 November 2025 Panda Cup	Vietnam	0–1	South Korea	Chengdu, China
15:30 UTC+8		Report	Kim Myung-jun 34'	Stadium: Shuangliu Sports Centre

=== 2026 ===
7 January 2026 AFC U-23 Asian Cup (Group C)	South Korea	0–0	Iran	Riyadh, Saudi Arabia
14:30 UTC+3		Report		Stadium: Al-Shabab Club Stadium; Attendance: 127; Referee: Ammar Mahfoodh (Bahrain)

10 January 2026 AFC U-23 Asian Cup (Group C)	Lebanon	2–4	South Korea	Riyadh, Saudi Arabia
14:30 UTC+3	Shahin 13'; El Fadl 48'	Report	Lee Hyun-yong 20'; Jeong Jae-sang 56'; Kang Seong-jin 71'; Kim Tae-won 76'	Stadium: Al-Shabab Club Stadium; Attendance: 588; Referee: Abdulla Al-Marri (Qatar)

13 January 2026 AFC U-23 Asian Cup (Group C)	Uzbekistan	2–0	South Korea	Riyadh, Saudi Arabia
14:30 UTC+3	Karimov 48'; Saidnurullaev 70'	Report		Stadium: Prince Faisal bin Fahd Sports City Stadium; Attendance: 139; Referee: Qasim Al-Hatmi (Oman)

17 January 2026 AFC U-23 Asian Cup (Quarter-finals)	Australia	1–2	South Korea	Jeddah, Saudi Arabia
18:30 UTC+3	Jovanovic 51'	Report	Baek Ga-on 21'; Shin Min-ha 88'	Stadium: King Abdullah Sports City Hall Stadium; Attendance: 172; Referee: Fu Ming (China)

20 January 2026 AFC U-23 Asian Cup (Semi-finals)	Japan	1–0	South Korea	Jeddah, Saudi Arabia
14:30 UTC+3	Koizumi 36'	Report		Stadium: King Abdullah Sports City Hall Stadium; Referee: Abdulla Al-Marri (Qatar)

23 January 2026 AFC U-23 Asian Cup (Third place match)	Vietnam	2–2 (a.e.t.) (7–6 p)	South Korea	Jeddah, Saudi Arabia
18:00 UTC+3	Nguyễn Quốc Việt 30'; Nguyễn Đình Bắc 71'	Report	Kim Tae-won 69'; Shin Min-ha 90+7'	Stadium: King Abdullah Sports City Hall Stadium; Referee: Abdullah Jamali (Kuwait)
	Penalties
	Khuất Văn Khang (penalty scored); Phạm Minh Phúc (penalty scored); Nguyễn Thái Quốc Cường (penalty scored); Nguyễn Ngọc Mỹ (penalty scored); Nguyễn Nhật Minh (penalty scored); Nguyễn Xuân Bắc (penalty scored); Nguyễn Thanh Nhàn (penalty scored)		(penalty scored) Kim Tae-won; (penalty scored) Kang Seong-jin; (penalty scored) Lee Chan-wook; (penalty scored) Kim Yong-hak; (penalty scored) Lee Hyun-yong; (penalty scored) Jang Seok-hwan; (penalty missed) Bae Hyun-seo

29 March Friendly	South Korea	2–1	Japan	Cheonan, South Korea
	Lee Young-jun 34', 49'	Report	Ishii 77'	Stadium: Korea Football Park

31 March Friendly	South Korea	1–4	United States	Cheonan, South Korea
	Park Seung-ho 12' (pen.)	Report	Baker-Whiting 7', 33'; Brennan 15'; Castañeda 80'	Stadium: Korea Football Park

3 June Friendly	South Korea	1–1	United Arab Emirates	Thanyaburi, Thailand
20:00 UTC+7	Lee Seung-won 47'	Report	Saleh 50'	Stadium: True BG Stadium

6 June Friendly	Thailand	2–3	South Korea	Thanyaburi, Thailand
20:00 UTC+7	Buaphan 3'; Chansri 16'	Report	Kang Seong-jin 10'; Lee Young-jun 49'; Choi Woo-jin 79'	Stadium: True BG Stadium

9 June Friendly	South Korea	0–1	Kyrgyzstan	Thanyaburi, Thailand
20:00 UTC+7		Report	Madanov 81'	Stadium: True BG Stadium

15 September 2026 Asian Games (Group D)	Qatar	1–4	South Korea	Nagoya, Japan
19:30 UTC+9	Sherif 85'	Report	Eom Ji-sung 7', 20', 45+1'; Kim Myung-jun 66'	Stadium: Paloma Mizuho Rugby Stadium; Attendance: 1,633; Referee: Adam Kersey (Australia)

22 September 2026 Asian Games (Group D)	South Korea	2–0	Saudi Arabia	Nagoya, Japan
19:00 UTC+9	Shin Min-ha 67'; Kim Myung-jun 69'	Report		Stadium: Paloma Mizuho Rugby Stadium; Attendance: 1,042; Referee: Hiroki Kasahara (Japan)

25 September 2026 Asian Games (Quarter-finals)	South Korea	4–0	Vietnam	Nagoya, Japan
19:30 UTC+9	Lee Young-jun 15', 81'; Kim Ji-soo 77'; Kim Myung-jun 88'	Report		Stadium: Paloma Mizuho Rugby Stadium; Attendance: 2,167; Referee: Firdavs Nosafarov (Uzbekistan)

30 September 2026 Asian Games (Semi-finals)	South Korea	2–1	China	Osaka, Japan
15:00 UTC+9	Lee Young-jun 33'; Bae Jun-ho 82'	Report	Wang Yudong 22'	Stadium: Nagai Stadium; Attendance: 4,470; Referee: Sadullo Gulmurodi (Tajikistan)

3 October Friendly	Australia	1–2 (Note: Played by separate under-21 team.)	South Korea	Gosford, Australia
15:00 UTC+10	Kim Min-soo 19' (o.g.)	Report	Ha Jeong-woo 2'; Yoon Do-young 39'	Stadium: Polytec Stadium

3 October 2026 Asian Games (Final)	South Korea	1–0	Japan	Toyota, Japan
19:30 UTC+9	Eom Ji-sung 61'	Report		Stadium: Toyota Stadium; Attendance: 30,086; Referee: Adam Kersey (Australia)

6 October Friendly	Australia	2–2	South Korea	Gosford, Australia
13:00 UTC+11	Di Pizio 45+5'; Akon 73'	Report	Sung Ye-geon 12'; Kim Ye-geon 36'	Stadium: Polytec Stadium

== Other matches ==
5 June 2024 2024 Maurice Revello Tournament	Ivory Coast U20	2–1	South Korea	Fos-sur-Mer, France
14:00 UTC+2	Wawa 12'; Ouotro 72'	Report	Hong Yong-jun 90'	Stadium: Stade Parsemain; Referee: Odette Hamilton (Jamaica)

14 June 2024 2024 Maurice Revello Tournament	South Korea	2–1	Indonesia U20	Saint-Chamas, France
14:00 UTC+2	Jung Seung-bae 48', 59'	Report	Firmansyah 78'	Stadium: Stade René Gimet; Referee: Akhona Makalima (South Africa)

== See also ==
- South Korea national under-23 football team results
