= 2024 WAFF U-23 Championship =

بطولة غرب آسيا لكرة القدم تحت 23 عاما

Tournament details
- Host country: Saudi Arabia
- Dates: 20–26 March
- Teams: 8 (from 2 confederations) (from 4 sub-confederations)
- Venues: 2 (in 2 host cities)

Final positions
- Champions: South Korea (1st title)
- Runners-up: Australia
- Third place: Saudi Arabia
- Fourth place: Egypt

Tournament statistics
- Matches played: 12
- Goals scored: 29 (2.42 per match)
- Top scorer: (Australia) Alou Kuol (3 goals)

The 2024 WAFF U-23 Championship was the fifth edition of the WAFF U-23 Championship, the international age-restricted football championship organized by the West Asian Football Federation (WAFF) for the men's under-23 national teams of West Asia. Eight teams competed in the tournament, with four WAFF teams and four other invitees.

Iraq were the defending champions, but they were eliminated from the tournament at the group stages. South Korea won their first WAFF title, beating Australia 4–3 on penalties after a 2–2 draw.

== Teams ==
Eight teams took part in the competition, with four from the WAFF and four other invitees. Iraq participated with its under-19 national team.

Team	Appearance	Previous best performance
Australia (invitee)	1st	Debut
Egypt (invitee)	1st	Debut
Iraq	3rd	Winners (2023)
Jordan	4th	Winners (2021)
Saudi Arabia	4th	Winners (2022)
South Korea (invitee)	1st	Debut
Thailand (invitee)	1st	Debut
United Arab Emirates	4th	Group stage (2015, 2021, 2023)

=== Draw ===
The draw for the group stage took place on 3 March 2024 at the WAFF headquarters in Amman, Jordan. Teams from the same group of the upcoming 2024 AFC U-23 Asian Cup could not be drawn into the same group. Host Saudi Arabia were automatically placed in position A1.

Group A
Pos	Team
A1	Saudi Arabia (H)
A2	Jordan

Group B
Pos	Team
B1	South Korea
B2	Thailand

Group C
Pos	Team
C1	Egypt
C2	United Arab Emirates

Group D
Pos	Team
D1	Australia
D2	Iraq

== Venues ==
(Saudi Arabia) Hofuf	(Saudi Arabia) Al-Mubarraz
Prince Abdullah bin Jalawi Stadium	Al Fateh Stadium
Capacity: 19,550	Capacity: 11,000
2024 WAFF U-23 Championship is located in Saudi Arabia

== Group stage ==
=== Group A ===
Pos	Team	Pld	W	D	L	GF	GA	GD	Pts	Qualification
1	Saudi Arabia (H)	1	0	1	0	1	1	0	1 (Note: Saudi Arabia won 2–1 on penalty shootouts)	Knockout stage
2	Jordan	1	0	1	0	1	1	0	1	

Source: WAFF
(H) Hosts
Notes:
20 March 2024
23:00 UTC+3

Saudi Arabia	1–1	Jordan
Al-Faraj 52' (pen.)		Kalbouneh 16'
Penalties
S. Al-Zaid (penalty scored); Al-Faraj (penalty missed); A. Zaid (penalty missed); Barnawi (penalty scored)	2–1	(penalty missed) Abu Taha; (penalty scored) Al-Thiabat; (penalty missed) Afaneh; (penalty missed) Abualnadi; (penalty missed) Bani Hani

Al Fateh Stadium, Al Mubarraz

=== Group B ===
Pos	Team	Pld	W	D	L	GF	GA	GD	Pts	Qualification
1	South Korea	1	1	0	0	1	0	+1	3	Knockout stage
2	Thailand	1	0	0	1	0	1	−1	0	

Source: WAFF
20 March 2024
20:00 UTC+3

South Korea	1–0	Thailand
Cho Hyun-taek 45+2'

Al Fateh Stadium, Al Mubarraz

=== Group C ===
Pos	Team	Pld	W	D	L	GF	GA	GD	Pts	Qualification
1	Egypt	1	1	0	0	1	0	+1	3	Knockout stage
2	United Arab Emirates	1	0	0	1	0	1	−1	0	

Source: WAFF
20 March 2024
23:00 UTC+3

Egypt	1–0	United Arab Emirates
Mazhar 82'

Prince Abdullah bin Jalawi Stadium, Hofuf
Referee: Abdullah Al-Shehri (Saudi Arabia)

=== Group D ===
Pos	Team	Pld	W	D	L	GF	GA	GD	Pts	Qualification
1	Australia	1	1	0	0	2	1	+1	3	Knockout stage
2	Iraq	1	0	0	1	1	2	−1	0	

Source: WAFF
20 March 2024
20:00 UTC+3

Australia	2–1	Iraq
D'Arrigo 10'; A. Kuol 15'	Report	H. Jaafar 49'

Prince Abdullah bin Jalawi Stadium, Hofuf

== Classification matches ==
=== Classification semi-finals ===
23 March 2024
20:00 UTC+3

Iraq	1–1	United Arab Emirates
Sadiq 53'		Al-Mansoori 34'
Penalties
Haydar (penalty scored); Mahdi (penalty scored); Mokhalad (penalty scored); K. Jaafar (penalty scored); H. Jaafar (penalty missed)	4–3	(penalty scored) Al-Maazmi; (penalty scored) Bader; (penalty scored) Al-Kass; (penalty missed) Ahmed; (penalty missed) Al-Balooshi

Prince Abdullah bin Jalawi Stadium, Hofuf

23 March 2024
20:00 UTC+3

Thailand	1–3	Jordan
Thanadol 23'		Abu Taha 32'; Al-Haj 37'; Bani Hani 52'

Al Fateh Stadium, Al Mubarraz

=== Seventh place play-off ===
26 March 2024
20:00 UTC+3

United Arab Emirates	0–1	Thailand
		Chitsanupong 28'

Prince Abdullah bin Jalawi Stadium, Hofuf

=== Fifth place play-off ===
26 March 2024
23:00 UTC+3

Iraq	1–3	Jordan
Bani Hani 45+1' (o.g.)		Abu Taha 20'; Al-Haj 68'; Kalbouneh 86'

Prince Abdullah bin Jalawi Stadium, Hofuf

== Knockout stage ==
Semi-finals
23 March – Hofuf
Australia (p)	1 (2)
Egypt	1 (1)
23 March – Al Mubarraz
South Korea	1
Saudi Arabia	0

Final
26 March – Al Mubarraz
Australia	2 (3)
South Korea (p)	2 (4)
Third place
26 March – Al Mubarraz
Egypt	2 (2)
Saudi Arabia (p)	2 (4)

=== Semi-finals ===
23 March 2024
23:00 UTC+3

Australia	1–1	Egypt
G. Kuol 15' (pen.)		J. Hollman 22' (o.g.)
Penalties
Courtney-Perkins (penalty missed); Okon-Engstler (penalty missed); Girdwood-Reich (penalty scored); Velupillay (penalty missed); Brook (penalty scored)	2–1	(penalty missed) Adel; (penalty missed) Faisal; (penalty scored) El Debes; (penalty missed) El Saaiy; (penalty missed) Eid

Prince Abdullah bin Jalawi Stadium, Hofuf
Referee: Baraa Abu Aisha (Palestine)

23 March 2024
23:00 UTC+3

South Korea	1–0	Saudi Arabia
Eom Ji-sung 41'

Al Fateh Stadium, Al Mubarraz

=== Third place play-off ===
26 March 2024
20:00 UTC+3

Egypt	2–2	Saudi Arabia
Saber 5'; Abdel Maguid 90+2'		Al-Sahafi 37'; Al-Nemer 86'
Penalties
Faisal (penalty missed); Abdel Maguid (penalty scored); Fayed (penalty scored); El Maghrabi (penalty missed)	2–4	(penalty scored) S. Al-Zaid; (penalty scored) Al-Julaydan; (penalty scored) Barnawi; (penalty scored) Al-Nemer

Al Fateh Stadium, Al Mubarraz
Referee: Shiekh Ahmad Alaeddin (Lebanon)

=== Final ===
26 March 2024
23:00 UTC+3

Australia	2–2	South Korea
A. Kuol 11', 72'	Report	Lee Young-jun 26'; Kang Seong-jin 62'
Penalties
A. Kuol (penalty scored); Italiano (penalty scored); D'Arrigo (penalty scored); J. Hollman (penalty missed); G. Kuol (penalty missed)	3–4	(penalty scored) Lee Tae-seok; (penalty scored) Lee Kang-hee; (penalty scored) An Jae-jun; (penalty scored) Seo Myung-guan

Al Fateh Stadium, Al Mubarraz

== Goalscorers ==
There were 29 goals scored in 12 matches, for an average of 2.42 goals per match.

3 goals

- (Australia) Alou Kuol

2 goals

- (Jordan) Mohannad Abu Taha
- (Jordan) Aref Al-Haj
- (Jordan) Baker Kalbouneh

1 goal

- (Australia) Louis D'Arrigo
- (Australia) Garang Kuol
- (Egypt) Hossam Abdelmaguid
- (Egypt) Bilal Mazhar
- (Egypt) Mahmoud Saber
- (Iraq) Halgurd Jaafar
- (Iraq) Ali Sadiq
- (Jordan) Reziq Bani Hani
- (Saudi Arabia) Abdulaziz Al-Faraj
- (Saudi Arabia) Meshari Al-Nemer
- (Saudi Arabia) Marwan Al-Sahafi
- (South Korea) Cho Hyun-taek
- (South Korea) Eom Ji-sung
- (South Korea) Kang Seong-jin
- (South Korea) Lee Young-jun
- (Thailand) Chitsanupong Choti
- (Thailand) Thanadol Kaosaart
- (United Arab Emirates) Mohammed Al-Mansoori

1 own goal

- (Australia) Jake Hollman (against Egypt)
- (Jordan) Reziq Bani Hani (against Iraq)

== Ranking ==
Rank	Team	M	W	D	L	GF	GA	GD	Points
1	South Korea	3	2	1	0	4	2	+2	7
2	Australia	3	1	2	0	5	4	+1	5
3	Saudi Arabia	3	0	2	1	3	4	-1	2
4	Egypt	3	1	2	0	4	3	+1	5
5	Jordan	3	2	1	0	7	3	+4	7
6	Iraq	3	0	1	2	3	6	-3	1
7	Thailand	3	1	0	2	2	4	-2	3
8	United Arab Emirates	3	0	1	2	1	3	-2	1
