= 2025 Panda Cup =

Tournament details
- Host country: China
- City: Chengdu
- Dates: 12–18 November 2025
- Teams: 4 (from 3 sub-confederations)
- Venue: 1 (in 1 host city)

Final positions
- Champions: South Korea (2nd title)
- Runners-up: China
- Third place: Uzbekistan
- Fourth place: Vietnam

Tournament statistics
- Matches played: 6
- Goals scored: 7 (1.17 per match)
- Attendance: 14,226 (2,371 per match)
- Top scorer(s): (China) Behram Abduweli (South Korea) Kim Myung-jun (2 goals each)

The 2025 Panda Cup (Chinese: 2025年熊猫杯) was the 8th edition of the international men's youth football tournament contested by the under-22 national teams.

The tournament was held in Chengdu, China from 12–18 November 2025.

== Participating teams ==
On 16 October 2025, it was announced that hosts China had invited South Korea, Vietnam and Uzbekistan to participate in the 2025 Panda Cup.

All four teams are qualified for the 2026 AFC U-23 Asian Cup and they will use their under-22 teams for preparation. While Vietnam also prepares for the 2025 SEA Games.

| Team | Sub-confederation |
|---|---|
| China (host) | EAFF |
| South Korea | EAFF |
| Vietnam | AFF |
| Uzbekistan | CAFA |

== Venues ==
Location of the host city of the 2025 Panda Cup.

- 1 Chengdu

2025 Panda Cup venue
Chengdu
Shuangliu Sports Centre
Capacity: 26,000

== Matches ==
All times are local, CST (UTC+8)

| Pos | Team | Pld | W | D | L | GF | GA | GD | Pts | |
|---|---|---|---|---|---|---|---|---|---|---|
| 1 | South Korea | 3 | 2 | 0 | 1 | 3 | 2 | +1 | 6 | Champions |
| 2 | China (H) | 3 | 1 | 1 | 1 | 2 | 1 | +1 | 4 | Runners-up |
| 3 | Uzbekistan | 3 | 1 | 1 | 1 | 1 | 2 | −1 | 4 | Third place |
| 4 | Vietnam | 3 | 1 | 0 | 2 | 1 | 2 | −1 | 3 | Fourth place |

Source: CFA
Rules for classification: 1) points; 2) goal difference; 3) goals scored; 4) head-to-head points; 5) head-to-head goal difference; 6) head-to-head number of goals scored; 7) Disciplinary points (yellow card = 1 point, red card as a result of two yellow cards = 3 points, direct red card = 3 points, yellow card followed by direct red card = 4 points).
(H) Hosts
12 November 2025
15:30

| South Korea | 2–0 | Uzbekistan |
|---|---|---|
| Jung Seung-bae 56'; Kim Myung-jun 88' | Report |

Shuangliu Sports Centre, Chengdu
12 November 2025
19:35

| China | 0–1 | Vietnam |
|---|---|---|
| | Report | Phạm Minh Phúc 81' |

Shuangliu Sports Centre, Chengdu
Attendance: 4,137
Referee: Shen Yinhao (China)

15 November 2025
15:30

| Uzbekistan | 1–0 | Vietnam |
|---|---|---|
| Khamidov 4' | Report |

Shuangliu Sports Centre, Chengdu
15 November 2025
19:35

| China | 2–0 | South Korea |
|---|---|---|
| Behram Abduweli 71', 81' | Report |

Shuangliu Sports Centre, Chengdu
Attendance: 10,089
Referee: Tang Shunqi (China)

18 November 2025
15:30

| Vietnam | 0–1 | South Korea |
|---|---|---|
| | Report | Kim Myung-jun 35' |

Shuangliu Sports Centre, Chengdu
18 November 2025
19:35

| China | 0–0 | Uzbekistan |
|---|---|---|
| | Report |

Shuangliu Sports Centre, Chengdu
Attendance: 4,218
Referee: Dai Yige (China)

== Goalscorers ==
There were 7 goals scored in 6 matches, for an average of 1.17 goals per match.

2 goals

- (China) Behram Abduweli
- (South Korea) Kim Myung-jun

1 goal

- (South Korea) Jung Seung-bae
- (Vietnam) Phạm Minh Phúc
- (Uzbekistan) Saidkhon Khamidov
