= Garang Kuol =

Australian soccer player (born 2004)

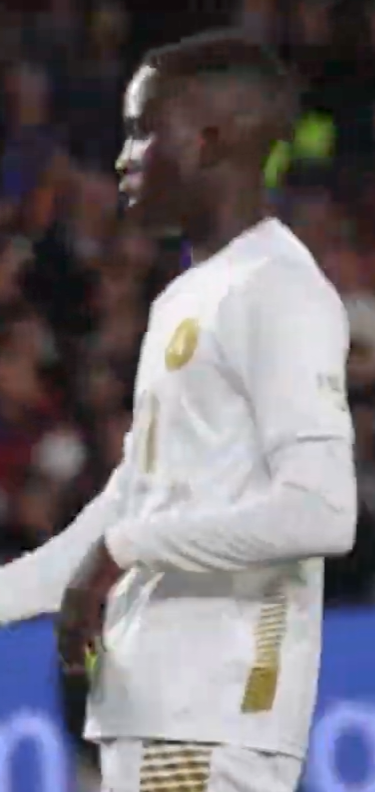
- Kuol playing with A-Leagues All Stars in 2022

Personal information
- Full name: Garang Mawien Kuol
- Date of birth: 15 September 2004 (age 22)
- Place of birth: Cairo, Egypt
- Height: 1.75 m (5 ft 9 in)
- Position: Winger

Team information
- Current team: Jablonec (on loan from Sparta Prague)
- Number: 36

Youth career
- Shepparton Soccer Club
- 2015–2020: Goulburn Valley Suns
- 2021: Central Coast Mariners

Senior career*
Years	Team	Apps	(Gls)
2021	CCM Academy	6	(0)
2021–2023	Central Coast Mariners	18	(6)
2023–2025	Newcastle United	0	(0)
2023	→ Heart of Midlothian (loan)	8	(1)
2023–2024	→ Volendam (loan)	15	(1)
2025–	Sparta Prague	23	(0)
2026–	→ Jablonec (loan)	1	(1)

International career^{‡}
2022	Australia U20	3	(1)
2023–	Australia U23	12	(2)
2022–	Australia	5	(1)
Medal record
Men's football
Representing Australia
WAFF U-23 Championship
Runner-up	2024 Saudi Arabia
- * Club domestic league appearances and goals as of 22 September 2026 ‡ National team caps and goals as of 9 June 2025

Garang Mawien Kuol (born 15 September 2004) is a professional soccer player who plays as a winger for Czech First League club Jablonec on loan from Sparta Prague. Born a South Sudanese refugee in Egypt, he plays for the Australia national team.

== Early life ==
Kuol was born on 15 September 2004 in an Egyptian refugee camp, to South Sudanese parents Mawien and Antonietta Kuol. His family fled their war-torn home in South Sudan to Egypt before eventually settling in Shepparton, Victoria, Australia in 2005. Growing up in regional Victoria, Garang was first introduced to football by his brother Kuol and frequently trained with his two other brothers Teng and Alou Kuol. Both Garang and Alou took inspiration from Australian footballers Tim Cahill and Mark Bresciano. Kuol started his football as a junior for Shepparton Soccer Club, before joining Goulburn Valley Suns, where he trained in the youth and senior ranks for five years until the age of 15.

== Club career ==
=== Central Coast Mariners ===
Kuol signed with Central Coast Mariners Academy in January 2021, joining his brother Alou Kuol. At the age of 16, Kuol got his first start for the senior NPL squad on 14 March, against Mounties Wanderers after the squad's main starters were absent with the A-League Men squad. In December, Kuol earned his first call-up to the A-League squad for their FFA Cup clash against Wollongong Wolves but wasn't officially named on the bench despite being with the substitute group on the day. In the subsequent round, Kuol scored on his professional debut on 21 December, just seven minutes after coming off the bench, in a 6–0 away win against APIA Leichhardt. He would miss the next game against Sydney FC due to illness. Kuol returned in the final as a late substitute where he was involved in his side's consolation goal in the seventh minute of stoppage time in a 2–1 defeat to Melbourne Victory.

Kuol made his A-League Men debut on 5 April 2022, scoring a goal with a first-time shot through Phoenix keeper Oliver Sail, in the Mariners' 5–0 win over Wellington Phoenix. His finish was praised by pundits including his brother, Alou, who stated, "Garangski has landed." Kuol went on to score three goals in his next six A-League Men appearances to secure Finals qualification. On 20 May, Kuol was one of two "Commissioner's picks" chosen to play in the 2022 A-Leagues All Stars Game against Barcelona. On 23 June, Kuol signed his first professional contract on a two-years deal with the Mariners amidst notable interests from foreign clubs. On 13 November, Kuol scored twice for the Mariners after coming on as a substitute in a 3–2 loss to Western United. His second goal, a powerful strike from a narrow angle, was named as the A-League Men's Goal of the Month for November by 10 News First, as selected by former Socceroo Alex Tobin. Kuol made his first league start for the Mariners on 18 December, managing one assist in a 2–1 win over Sydney FC, and later his last appearance for the club on 30 December in a 2–1 win against Melbourne Victory where he received a standing ovation from the fans at Central Coast Stadium.

=== Newcastle United ===
In mid-September 2022, it was reported that Kuol had signed a pre-agreement and would transfer to English Premier League side Newcastle United during the January 2023 transfer window. On 30 September 2022, Kuol signed a four-year deal with Newcastle United for a transfer fee of £300,000 included with sell-on clauses and other bonus triggers. He officially joined the club on 1 January 2023. On 12 January 2023, Kuol was loaned to Scottish Premiership club Heart of Midlothian until the end of the 2022–23 season. He made his debut at Tynecastle Park the following day, coming on as a substitute for Barrie McKay at the 77th minute of a 1–0 league victory over St Mirren. On 1 February, Kuol started his first league game, played out of position as a midfielder instead of his natural position as a forward, in a 3–0 defeat to Rangers. He scored his first goal for the club in the next fixture against Rangers in the 4th minute of additional time after coming on as an 83rd-minute substitute to secure a 2–2 draw. Kuol returned to Newcastle in late June, making only limited appearances for Hearts.

Kuol was not added to the Magpie's pre-season in the United States, instead training in Verona with fellow Premier League academy players, Amani Richards and Sol Sidibe. While awaiting for the completion of his work permit, on 8 August, Kuol was sent on a season-long loan to Eredivisie club FC Volendam. He made his debut for the club on 12 August in a 2–1 league loss to Vitesse at Kras Stadion. In his second starting appearance, Kuol scored his first league goal for the club in a 3–1 defeat to Fortuna Sittard on 17 September 2023. He became the youngest foreigner to score in FC Volendam's history, having netted the club's third goal in four games, all of which have been defeats. He was awarded Volendam's August–September Goal of the Month for his strike against Fortuna. After the resignation of manager Matthias Kohler, Kuol faced reduced playing time under new manager and former assistant Regillio Simons, who placed tactical changes that led him to be benched. Kuol returned from loan in May 2024, having experienced relegation in the Eredivisie with Volendam.

After his return, Kuol made his non-competitive debut for Newcastle United in a friendly against Tottenham on 22 May at Melbourne Cricket Ground, during Newcastle's pre-season tour in Melbourne, Australia.

=== Sparta Prague ===
On 29 August 2025, Kuol signed a multi-year contract with Czech First League club Sparta Prague for an undisclosed fee.

==== Jablonec (loan) ====
On 29 August 2026, Kuol joined Czech First League club Jablonec on a one-year loan deal without an option to make the transfer permanent.

== International career ==
=== Youth ===
In October 2022, Kuol was called up to the Australian under-20 side for 2023 AFC U-20 Asian Cup qualification matches in Kuwait. Kuol's coach at Central Coast Mariners, Nick Montgomery, was critical of the selection, arguing that Kuol would have better chances of selection for the 2022 FIFA World Cup by playing consistently for the Mariners in the 2022–23 A-League Men. Kuol scored in the second qualifying game in a 4–1 win over India as Australia progressed to the 2023 AFC U-20 Asian Cup in Uzbekistan. However, after consultation with his loanee club Hearts and parent club Newcastle United, Kuol was deemed unavailable for selection ahead of the U20 Asian Cup.

Kuol, along with his brother, Alou, was named in the Australian under-23 team for the 2023 Maurice Revello Tournament in June 2023. Kuol accumulated three assists during the tournament, managing two against the Mediterranean Select side, and one against Mexico, to reach the semi-final. After the loss to finalists Panama, he added an assist to his tally in a 2–0 victory over France U21 in the third-place playoff. In March 2024, Kuol and his brother were recalled to the under-23 squad for the 2024 WAFF U-23 Championship. Kuol scored one goal in the semi-final win over Egypt to reach the final against South Korea. After a 2–2 scoreline in regular time, Kuol missed his respective penalty in the 4–3 penalty shootout defeat to the Koreans, becoming runners-up in the tournament.

In April, Kuol was named to the under-23 squad for the 2024 AFC U-23 Asian Cup in Qatar, in contention to secure a place for the 2024 Summer Olympics. The Olyroos failed to qualify past the group stage without scoring a goal, with Kuol making all three appearances of the bench against Jordan, Indonesia, and Qatar.

=== Senior ===
In September 2022, Kuol earned his first senior national team call-up, being selected in the Australian squad to play two friendlies against New Zealand. He made his debut at 18 years and 10 days of age as a second-half substitute in the second game of the New Zealand series, earning plaudits for a number of dangerous contributions in attack. Kuol's debut made him the sixth-youngest "Socceroo" of all time, and the youngest to be selected in an Australia squad since Harry Kewell.

Kuol was named in Australia's squad for the 2022 FIFA World Cup in November 2022 at 18 years old, making him the youngest player ever selected for Australia for a FIFA World Cup. Kuol came on as a substitute in the second half of Australia's loss to France in their opening game of the Cup on 22 November 2022, becoming the youngest player to appear at a World Cup for Australia and the ninth-youngest player ever to take the field at a World Cup. Kuol also came on as a substitute in Australia's round of sixteen loss to Argentina, who would go on to win the competition, making him the youngest player to feature in a FIFA World Cup knockout match since Pelé at the 1958 FIFA World Cup. Kuol had a late chance to equalise for Australia, however, his shot was saved by Argentinian goalkeeper Emiliano Martínez.

Kuol scored his first international goal in Australia's first match since the 2022 FIFA World Cup, his fourth international appearance, scoring against Ecuador in a friendly at Western Sydney Stadium on 24 March 2023.

== Personal life ==
Kuol has three older brothers and three younger brothers. Two of his brothers, Alou Kuol and Teng Kuol, are also professional soccer players who had played with Central Coast Mariners and Goulburn Valley Suns. Most notably, Alou had played in Germany with VfB Stuttgart in the Bundesliga, making one league appearance, before returning to the Mariners in July 2023.

== Career statistics ==
=== Club ===
As of match played 11 February 2024

Appearances and goals by club, season and competition
Club	Season	League			National cup (Note: Includes Australia Cup, Scottish Cup)		Other		Total	
Club	Season	Division	Apps	Goals	Apps	Goals	Apps	Goals	Apps	Goals
Central Coast Mariners Academy	2021	NPL NSW 2	6	0	—		—		6	0
Central Coast Mariners	2021–22	A-League Men	9	4	3	1	—		12	5
Central Coast Mariners	2022–23	A-League Men	9	2	1	0	—		10	2
Central Coast Mariners	Total		18	6	4	1	—		22	7
Heart of Midlothian (loan)	2022–23	Scottish Premiership	8	1	1	0	0	0	9	1
Volendam (loan)	2023–24	Eredivisie	15	1	1	0	—		16	1
Sparta Praha	2025-26	Czech First Liga	4		1		1		6	
Career total			51	8	7	1	1	0	59	9

=== International ===
Appearances and goals by national team and year
National team	Year	Apps	Goals
Australia	2022	3	0
Australia	2023	2	1
Total		5	1

List of international goals scored by Garang Kuol
No.	Date	Venue	Opponent	Score	Result	Competition
1	24 March 2023	Western Sydney Stadium, Sydney, Australia	Ecuador	3–1	3–1	Friendly

== Honours ==
=== Player ===
Australia U-23

- WAFF U-23 Championship: runner-up 2024

=== Individual ===
- A-Leagues All Star: 2022
