= South Korea national under-23 football team results (2000–2009) =

- Win Draw Loss

This article is the list of international matches of the South Korea national under-23 football team from 2000 to 2009.

== Results by year ==
| Year | Pld | W | D | L | Win % |
|---|---|---|---|---|---|
| 2000 | 10 | 9 | 0 | 1 | 90.00 |
| 2001 | Did not play | | | | |
| 2002 | 9 | 7 | 2 | 0 | 77.78 |
| 2003 | 9 | 7 | 1 | 1 | 77.78 |
| 2004 | 22 | 12 | 5 | 5 | 54.55 |
| 2005 | Did not play | | | | |
| 2006 | 9 | 5 | 2 | 2 | 55.56 |
| 2007 | 13 | 8 | 4 | 1 | 61.54 |
| 2008 | 6 | 4 | 1 | 1 | 66.67 |
| 2009 | 1 | 0 | 0 | 1 | 0.00 |
| Total | 79 | 52 | 15 | 12 | 65.82 |

== Under-23 matches ==
=== 2000 ===
| 9 January 4 Nations Tournament | South Korea | 2–0 | Egypt | Adelaide, Australia |
| 17:30 ACST (UTC+09:30) | Seol Ki-hyeon 68'; Lee Kwan-woo 88' | Report | | Stadium: Hindmarsh Stadium; Attendance: 5,807; Referee: Hugo Brett (Australia) |

| 12 January 4 Nations Tournament | South Korea | 3–0 | Nigeria | Adelaide, Australia |
| 19:00 ACST (UTC+09:30) | Lee Dong-gook 60'; Seol Ki-hyeon 68'; Choi Chul-woo 87' | Report | | Stadium: Hindmarsh Stadium; Attendance: 4,017; Referee: Mark Shield (Australia) |

| 15 January 4 Nations Tournament | Australia | 0–3 | South Korea | Adelaide, Australia |
| 20:00 ACST (UTC+09:30) | | Report | Seol Ki-hyeon 14'; Lee Kwan-woo 42'; Lee Dong-gook 45+2' | Stadium: Hindmarsh Stadium; Attendance: 5,945; Referee: Eddie Lennie (Australia) |

| 21 January Friendly | New Zealand | 1–2 | South Korea | Auckland, New Zealand |
| 17:45 NZST (UTC+12) | Scott 42' | Report | Ahn Hyo-yeon 47'; Seol Ki-hyeon 56' | Stadium: North Harbour Stadium; Attendance: 12,000; Referee: Derek Rugg (New Zealand) |

| 23 January Friendly | New Zealand | 2–5 | South Korea | Palmerston North, New Zealand |
| 15:00 NZST (UTC+12) | Campbell 64'; Hickey 72' | Report | Kim Dae-wook 1'; Ahn Hyo-yeon 13'; Kim Do-kyun 61'; Kim Seung-hyun 67'; Choi Chul-woo 78' | Stadium: Showgrounds; Attendance: 3,000; Referee: Bruce Grimshaw (New Zealand) |

| 29 August Friendly | South Korea | 5–1 | Nigeria | Seongnam, South Korea |
| 17:00 KST (UTC+09) | Kim Do-hoon 4'; Lee Chun-soo 30' (pen.), 41', 70'; Kim Do-kyun 61' | Report | Aghahowa 3' | Stadium: Seongnam Sports Complex; Attendance: 16,500; Referee: Zhang Yeduan (China PR) |

| 1 September Friendly | South Korea | 5–1 | Nigeria | Seoul, South Korea |
| 19:00 KST (UTC+09) | Park Ji-sung 10'; Ko Jong-soo 44', 80'; Park Jin-sub 50'; Kim Do-kyun 86' | Report | Yakubu 35' (pen.) | Stadium: Olympic Stadium; Attendance: 25,000; Referee: Zhu Liuyi (China PR) |

| 14 September 2000 Summer Olympics (Group B) | South Korea | 0–3 | Spain | Adelaide, Australia |
| 18:30 ACST (UTC+09:30) | | Report | Velamazán 10'; Mari 26'; Xavi 37' | Stadium: Hindmarsh Stadium; Attendance: 14,060; Referee: Felipe Ramos (Mexico) |

| 17 September 2000 Summer Olympics (Group B) | South Korea | 1–0 | Morocco | Adelaide, Australia |
| 18:30 ACST (UTC+09:30) | Lee Chun-soo 53' (pen.) | Report | | Stadium: Hindmarsh Stadium; Attendance: 12,753; Referee: Herbert Fandel (Germany) |

| 20 September 2000 Summer Olympics (Group B) | South Korea | 1–0 | Chile | Adelaide, Australia |
| 18:30 ACST (UTC+09:30) | Lee Dong-gook 28' | Report | | Stadium: Hindmarsh Stadium; Attendance: 16,309; Referee: Ľuboš Micheľ (Slovakia) |

=== 2002 ===
| 7 September Friendly | South Korea | 0–0 | North Korea | Seoul, South Korea |
| 19:00 KST (UTC+09) | | | | Stadium: Seoul World Cup Stadium; Attendance: 63,000; Referee: Kwon Jong-chul (South Korea) |

| 20 September Friendly | South Korea | 1–0 | United Arab Emirates | Changwon, South Korea |
| 19:00 KST (UTC+09) | Lee Dong-gook 13' (pen.) | | | Stadium: Changwon Stadium; Referee: Park Sang-goo (South Korea) |

| 23 September Friendly | South Korea | 2–1 | Kuwait | Busan, South Korea |
| 19:00 KST (UTC+09) | Kim Eun-jung 17'; Lee Chun-soo 63' | Report | Abdullah 42' | Stadium: Busan Gudeok Stadium |

| 27 September 2002 Asian Games (Group A) | South Korea | 4–0 | Maldives | Busan, South Korea |
| 19:00 KST (UTC+09) | Choi Tae-uk 5'; Ghani 45' (o.g.); Lee Dong-gook 59'; Mohamed 89' (o.g.) | | | Stadium: Busan Gudeok Stadium |

| 30 September 2002 Asian Games (Group A) | Oman | 2–5 | South Korea | Yangsan, South Korea |
| 19:00 KST (UTC+09) | Saleh 50'; Al-Busaidi 76' | | Cho Sung-hwan 24'; Kim Do-heon 49'; Lee Dong-gook 60'; Lee Chun-soo 65', 85' | Stadium: Yangsan Stadium |

| 3 October 2002 Asian Games (Group A) | Malaysia | 0–4 | South Korea | Masan, South Korea |
| 19:00 KST (UTC+09) | | | Kim Eun-jung 20', 72'; Choi Tae-uk 36'; Lee Dong-gook 90' | Stadium: Masan Stadium |

| 8 October 2002 Asian Games (Quarter-finals) | South Korea | 1–0 | Bahrain | Ulsan, South Korea |
| 19:00 KST (UTC+09) | Lee Dong-gook 38' (pen.) | | | Stadium: Munsu World Cup Stadium |

| 10 October 2002 Asian Games (Semi-finals) | Iran | 0–0 (a.e.t.) (5–3 p) | South Korea | Busan, South Korea |
| 19:00 KST (UTC+09) | | | | Stadium: Busan Gudeok Stadium |
| | Penalties |
| | Nekounam (penalty scored); Kaebi (penalty scored); Nosrati (penalty scored); Mobali (penalty scored); Golmohammadi (penalty scored) | | (penalty scored) Lee Dong-gook; (penalty missed) Lee Young-pyo; (penalty scored) Choi Tae-uk; (penalty scored) Park Ji-sung |

| 13 October 2002 Asian Games (Bronze medal match) | Thailand | 0–3 | South Korea | Ulsan, South Korea |
| 16:00 KST (UTC+09) | | | Park Dong-hyuk 15'; Lee Chun-soo 73'; Choi Tae-uk 74' | Stadium: Munsu World Cup Stadium |

=== 2003 ===
| 3 February 4 Nations Tournament | South Korea | 2–0 | Lesotho | Johannesburg, South Africa |
| 16:00 SAST (UTC+02) | Choi Young-hoon 18'; Choi Tae-uk 24' | | | Stadium: Orlando Stadium |

| 5 February 4 Nations Tournament | South Korea | 2–0 | Namibia | Johannesburg, South Africa |
| 16:00 SAST (UTC+02) | Jeon Jae-woon 9' (pen.); Kim Jin-yong 44' | | | Stadium: Orlando Stadium |

| 8 February 4 Nations Tournament | South Africa | 2–1 | South Korea | Johannesburg, South Africa |
| 15:00 SAST (UTC+02) | Mahlangu 82'; Thwala 89' | | Cho Jae-jin 8' | Stadium: Orlando Stadium |

| 12 February Friendly | Netherlands | 0–1 | South Korea | Amsterdam, Netherlands |
| 15:00 CET (UTC+01) | | | Son Seung-joon 63' | Stadium: Olympic Stadium; Attendance: 5,000 |

| 5 April Friendly | South Korea | 4–1 | Costa Rica | Ulsan, South Korea |
| 19:00 KST (UTC+09) | Choi Tae-uk 21'; Kim Do-heon 58'; Jeon Jae-woon 81'; Jung Jo-gook 86' | | López 3' | Stadium: Munsu Cup Stadium; Attendance: 21,000; Referee: Subkhiddin Mohd Salleh (Malaysia) |

| 23 July Friendly | Japan | 1–1 | South Korea | Tokyo, Japan |
| 19:00 JST (UTC+09) | Cho Byung-kuk 29' (o.g.) | | Choi Tae-uk 22' | Stadium: Yoyogi National Stadium; Attendance: 38,058; Referee: Shamsul Maidin (Singapore) |

| 17 September Friendly | South Korea | 2–1 | Japan | Seoul, South Korea |
| 19:00 KST (UTC+09) | Kim Dong-jin 6', 32' | | Takamatsu 77' | Stadium: Seoul World Cup Stadium; Attendance: 41,254; Referee: Subkhiddin Mohd Salleh (Malaysia) |

| 1 October 2004 Summer Olympics (Qualification) | Hong Kong | 0–1 | South Korea | Wan Chai, Hong Kong |
| 15:00 HKT (UTC+08) | | | Park Yong-ho 55' | Stadium: Hong Kong Stadium; Referee: Seityono Midi Nitrorejo (Indonesia) |

| 7 October 2004 Summer Olympics (Qualification) | South Korea | 2–0 | Hong Kong | Goyang, South Korea |
| 19:00 KST (UTC+09) | Cho Jae-jin 45+1'; Choi Tae-uk 79' | | | Stadium: Goyang Stadium; Attendance: 42,000; Referee: Ahmad Khalidi Supian (Malaysia) |

=== 2004 ===
| 7 January Friendly | Australia | 1–0 | South Korea | Perth, Australia |
| 19:30 AWST (UTC+08) | Holman 90' | | | Stadium: Perth Oval; Attendance: 10,000; Referee: Eddie Lennie (Australia) |

| 16 January Qatar International Friendship Tournament | South Korea | 2–0 | Switzerland | Doha, Qatar |
| 18:00 EAT (UTC+03) | Choi Tae-uk 17'; Cho Jae-jin 63' | | | Stadium: Al-Ittihad Stadium; Attendance: 200 |

| 18 January Qatar International Friendship Tournament | Morocco | 2–0 | South Korea | Doha, Qatar |
| 18:00 EAT (UTC+03) | Ajeddou 8'; Akaddar 90+3' | | | Stadium: Al-Ittihad Stadium; Attendance: 300 |

| 23 January Qatar International Friendship Tournament | Morocco | 3–1 | South Korea | Doha, Qatar |
| 19:00 EAT (UTC+03) | Allaoui 52'; Aqqal 62'; El Moubarki 87' | | Choi Tae-uk 23' | Stadium: Al-Ittihad Stadium; Attendance: 300 |

| 21 February Friendly | Japan | 2–0 | South Korea | Osaka, Japan |
| 15:00 | Matsui 56'; Morisaki 81' | | | Stadium: Yanmar Stadium Nagai; Attendance: 38,601; Referee: Benito Archundia (Mexico) |

| 3 March 2004 Summer Olympics (Qualification) | South Korea | 1–0 | China | Seoul, South Korea |
| 19:00 | Cho Jae-jin 81' | | | Stadium: Seoul World Cup Stadium; Attendance: 20,124; Referee: Toru Kamikawa (Japan) |

| 17 March 2004 Summer Olympics (Qualification) | Iran | 0–1 | South Korea | Tehran, Iran |
| 16:00 | | | Lee Chun-soo 60' | Stadium: Azadi Stadium; Attendance: 20,000; Referee: Rahan (Bahrain) |

| 24 March 2004 Summer Olympics (Qualification) | Malaysia | 0–1 | South Korea | Petaling Jaya, Malaysia |
| 20:45 | | | Cho Jae-jin 43' (pen.) | Stadium: Petaling Jaya Stadium; Attendance: 18,000; Referee: Ala Abdul Kadir Nema (Iraq) |

| 6 April Friendly | South Korea | 1–0 | Iraq | Seoul, South Korea |
| 19:00 | Kim Dong-hyun 37' | | | Stadium: Seoul World Cup Stadium; Attendance: 25,204; Referee: Kashihara (Japan) |

| 14 April 2004 Summer Olympics (Qualification) | South Korea | 3–0 | Malaysia | Suwon, South Korea |
| 19:00 | Kim Dong-hyun 2', 85'; Jeon Jae-woon 68' | | | Stadium: Suwon World Cup Stadium; Attendance: 25,507 |

| 1 May 2004 Summer Olympics (Qualification) | China | 0–2 | South Korea | Changsha, China |
| 19:30 | | | Cho Jae-jin 45'; Kim Dong-jin 47' | Stadium: Helong Sports Center Stadium; Attendance: 38,000 |

| 12 May 2004 Summer Olympics (Qualification) | South Korea | 1–0 | Iran | Seoul, South Korea |
| 19:00 | Kim Do-heon 89' | | | Stadium: Seoul World Cup Stadium; Attendance: 20,217; Referee: Yoshida (Japan) |

| 15 July Friendly | Morocco | 0–0 | South Korea | Casablanca, Morocco |
| 18:00 | | | | Stadium: Stade Mohammed V Attendance: 15,000 |

| 21 July Friendly | South Korea | 0–0 | Japan | Seoul, South Korea |
| 19:00 | | | | Stadium: Seoul World Cup Stadium; Attendance: 41,228; Referee: Sun Baojie (China) |

| 30 July Friendly | South Korea | 3–1 | Australia | Seogwipo, South Korea |
| 19:00 | Cho Jae-jin 17'; Kim Dong-jin 65'; Choi Sung-kuk 78' | | Elrich 85' | Stadium: Jeju World Cup Stadium; Attendance: 32,134 |

| 11 August 2004 Summer Olympics (Group A) | South Korea | 2–2 | Greece | Thessaloniki, Greece |
| 20:30 | Kim Dong-jin 43'; Vyntra 64' (o.g.) | Report | Taralidis 78'; Papadopoulos 82' (pen.) | Stadium: Kaftanzoglio Stadium; Attendance: 25,152; Referee: Jorge Larrionda (Uruguay) |

| 14 August 2004 Summer Olympics (Group A) | South Korea | 1–0 | Mexico | Athens, Greece |
| 20:30 | Kim Jung-woo 16' | Report | | Stadium: Karaiskakis Stadium; Attendance: 14,026; Referee: Claus Bo Larsen (Denmark) |

| 17 August 2004 Summer Olympics (Group A) | South Korea | 3–3 | Mali | Thessaloniki, Greece |
| 20:30 | Cho Jae-jin 57', 59'; Tamboura 64' (o.g.) | Report | N'Diaye 7', 24', 55' | Stadium: Kaftanzoglio Stadium; Attendance: 3,320; Referee: Éric Poulat (France) |

| 21 August 2004 Summer Olympics (Quarter-finals) | Paraguay | 3–2 | South Korea | Thessaloniki, Greece |
| 21:00 | Bareiro 19', 71'; Cardozo 61' | Report | Lee Chun-soo 74', 79' (pen.) | Stadium: Kaftanzoglio Stadium; Attendance: 4,080; Referee: Massimo De Santis (Italy) |

=== 2006 ===
| 14 November Friendly | South Korea | 1–1 | Japan | Changwon, South Korea |
| 20:00 KST (UTC+09) | Park Chu-young 4' | | Ahn Tae-eun 64' (o.g.) | Stadium: Changwon Civic Stadium; Attendance: 9,375; Referee: Cheung Yim Yau (Hong Kong) |

| 21 November Friendly | Japan | 1–1 | South Korea | Tokyo, Japan |
| 19:20 JST (UTC+09) | Masuda 74' | | Yang Dong-hyun 45' | Stadium: National Olympic Stadium; Attendance: 22,115; Referee: Zhang Lei (China PR) |

| 23 November Friendly | United Arab Emirates | 0–2 | South Korea | Dubai, United Arab Emirates |
| 18:15 | | Report | Oh Jang-eun 55'; Yeom Ki-hun 66' | Stadium: Al Maktoum Stadium |

| 28 November 2006 Asian Games (Group B) | South Korea | 3–0 | Bangladesh | Doha, Qatar |
| 17:15 EAT (UTC+03) | Lee Chun-soo 2'; Park Chu-young 58', 73' | | | Stadium: Al-Gharafa Stadium; Referee: Marat Ismailov (Uzbekistan) |

| 2 December 2006 Asian Games (Group B) | Vietnam | 0–2 | South Korea | Doha, Qatar |
| 17:15 EAT (UTC+03) | | | Lee Ho 7'; Kim Jin-kyu 90+2' | Stadium: Grand Hamad Stadium; Referee: Abdullah Balideh (Qatar) |

| 5 December 2006 Asian Games (Group B) | South Korea | 1–0 | Bahrain | Al-Rayyan, Qatar |
| 19:45 EAT (UTC+03) | Oh Beom-seok 57' | | | Stadium: Umm-Affai Stadium; Referee: Krishnan Ramachandran (Malaysia) |

| 9 December 2006 Asian Games (Quarter-finals) | South Korea | 3–0 | North Korea | Al-Rayyan, Qatar |
| 19:00 EAT (UTC+03) | Kim Chi-woo 31'; Yeom Ki-hun 34'; Jung Jo-gook 57' | | | Stadium: Umm-Affai Stadium; Referee: Abdulrahman Racho (Syria) |

| 12 December 2006 Asian Games (Semi-finals) | Iraq | 1–0 | South Korea | Doha, Qatar |
| 19:00 EAT (UTC+03) | Saeed 24' | | | Stadium: Al-Gharafa Stadium; Referee: Ali Al-Badwawi (United Arab Emirates) |

| 14 December 2006 Asian Games (Bronze medal match) | Iran | 1–0 (a.e.t.) | South Korea | Doha, Qatar |
| 17:30 EAT (UTC+03) | Kolahkaj 114' | | | Stadium: Al-Gharafa Stadium; Referee: Abdulrahman Abdou (Qatar) |

=== 2007 ===
| 28 February 2008 Summer Olympics (Qualification) | South Korea | 1–0 | Yemen | Suwon, South Korea |
| 20:00 KST (UTC+09) | Yang Dong-hyun 63' | | | Stadium: Suwon World Cup Stadium; Attendance: 11,672; Referee: Tan Hai (China PR) |

| 14 March 2008 Summer Olympics (Qualification) | United Arab Emirates | 1–3 | South Korea | Abu Dhabi, United Arab Emirates |
| 19:00 (UTC+04) | Saker 49' | | Han Dong-won 22', 80'; Lee Seung-hyun 36' | Stadium: Al Nahyan Stadium; Attendance: 500; Referee: Tan Hai (China PR) |

| 28 March 2008 Summer Olympics (Qualification) | South Korea | 2–0 | Uzbekistan | Ansan, South Korea |
| 20:00 KST (UTC+09) | Han Dong-won 34', 84' | | | Stadium: Ansan Wa~ Stadium; Attendance: 32,377; Referee: Tallat Najm (Lebanon) |

| 18 April 2008 Summer Olympics (Qualification) | Uzbekistan | 0–1 | South Korea | Tashkent, Uzbekistan |
| 17:00 UZT (UTC+05) | | | Baek Ji-hoon 76' | Stadium: Pakhtakor Markaziy Stadium; Attendance: 5,000; Referee: K. Ibrahim (Kazakhstan) |

| 16 May 2008 Summer Olympics (Qualification) | Yemen | 1–0 | South Korea | Sana'a, Yemen |
| 17:00 (UTC+04) | Al-Baadani 41' | | | Stadium: Ali Mohsen Stadium; Attendance: 10,000; Referee: Krishma (Bangladesh) |

| 6 June 2008 Summer Olympics (Qualification) | South Korea | 3–1 | United Arab Emirates | Daejeon, South Korea |
| 20:00 KST (UTC+09) | Lee Keun-ho 32', 48'; Kim Chang-soo 80' | | Khamis 70' | Stadium: Daejeon World Cup Stadium; Attendance: 30,510; Referee: Subkhiddin Mohd Salleh (Malaysia) |

| 22 August 2008 Summer Olympics (Qualification) | South Korea | 2–1 | Uzbekistan | Seoul, South Korea |
| 20:00 KST (UTC+09) | Lee Sang-ho 71'; Lee Keun-ho 78' | | Kim Jin-kyu 45+1' (o.g.) | Stadium: Seoul World Cup Stadium; Attendance: 22,885; Referee: Ben Williams (Australia) |

| 3 September Friendly | Qatar | 0–0 | South Korea | Dubai, United Arab Emirates |
| 17:20 (UTC+04) | | | | Stadium: Al-Rashid Stadium; Attendance: 300 |

| 8 September 2008 Summer Olympics (Qualification) | Bahrain | 0–1 | South Korea | Riffa, Bahrain |
| 19:00 (UTC+03) | | | Kang Min-soo 74' | Stadium: Bahrain National Stadium; Attendance: 400 |

| 12 September 2008 Summer Olympics (Qualification) | South Korea | 1–0 | Syria | Seoul, South Korea |
| 20:00 KST (UTC+09) | Kim Seung-yong 9' | | | Stadium: Seoul World Cup Stadium; Attendance: 20,129; Referee: Yang Zhiqiang (China PR) |

| 17 October 2008 Summer Olympics (Qualification) | Syria | 0–0 | South Korea | Damascus, Syria |
| 15:00 EEST (UTC+03) | | | | Stadium: Abbasiyyin Stadium; Attendance: 300; Referee: Hedayat Mombini (Iran) |

| 17 November 2008 Summer Olympics (Qualification) | Uzbekistan | 0–0 | South Korea | Tashkent, Uzbekistan |
| 15:00 UZT (UTC+05) | | | Baek Ji-hoon 76' | Stadium: Pakhtakor Markaziy Stadium; Attendance: 3,000; Referee: Abdullah Balideh (Qatar) |

| 21 November 2008 Summer Olympics (Qualification) | South Korea | 0–0 | Bahrain | Ansan, South Korea |
| 20:00 KST (UTC+09) | | | | Stadium: Ansan Wa~ Stadium; Attendance: 28,221; Referee: Subkhiddin Mohd Salleh (Malaysia) |

=== 2008 ===
| 16 July Friendly | South Korea | 2–1 | Guatemala | Ansan, South Korea |
| 20:00 KST (UTC+09) | Kim Kun-hoan 56'; Lee Keun-ho 81' | | Ávila 32' | Stadium: Ansan Wa~ Stadium, Ansan; Attendance: 19,388; Referee: Liu Kwok Man (Hong Kong) |

| 27 July Friendly | South Korea | 2–1 | Ivory Coast | Suwon, South Korea |
| 20:00 KST (UTC+09) | Jung Sung-ryong 20'; Lee Keun-ho 62' | | Gervinho 74' | Stadium: Suwon World Cup Stadium; Attendance: 31,266; Referee: Huang Junjie (China PR) |

| 31 July Friendly | South Korea | 1–0 | Australia | Seoul, South Korea |
| 20:00 KST (UTC+09) | Shin Young-rok 24' | | | Stadium: Seoul World Cup Stadium; Attendance: 20,533; Referee: Kenji Ogiya (Japan) |

| 7 August 2008 Summer Olympics (Group D) | South Korea | 1–1 | Cameroon | Qinhuangdao, China |
| 19:45 CST (UTC+08) | Park Chu-young 68' | Report | Mandjeck 81' | Stadium: Qinhuangdao Olympic Sports Center Stadium; Attendance: 21,943; Referee: Jair Marrufo (United States) |

| 10 August 2008 Summer Olympics (Group D) | Italy | 3–0 | South Korea | Qinhuangdao, China |
| 19:45 CST (UTC+08) | Rossi 15'; Rocchi 32'; Montolivo 90' | Report | | Stadium: Qinhuangdao Olympic Sports Center Stadium; Attendance: 29,455; Referee: Thomas Einwaller (Austria) |

| 13 August 2008 Summer Olympics (Group D) | South Korea | 1–0 | Honduras | Shanghai, China |
| 17:00 CST (UTC+08) | Kim Dong-jin 23' | Report | | Stadium: Shanghai Stadium; Attendance: 34,160; Referee: Michael Hester (New Zealand) |

== Other matches ==
| 14 January 2004 Qatar International Friendship Tournament | South Korea | 5–0 | Paraguay XI | Doha, Qatar |
| 18:00 EAT (UTC+03) | Choi Sung-kuk 13'; Choi Tae-uk 45', 53', 61'; Jeon Jae-woon 85' | | | Stadium: Al-Ittihad Stadium; Attendance: 200; Referee: Yassim Al-Hail (Qatar) |

| 21 January 2004 Qatar International Friendship Tournament | Japan Universiade | 0–3 | South Korea | Doha, Qatar |
| 19:00 | | | Cho Jae-jin 32'; Choi Tae-uk 58' (pen.); Choi Sung-kuk 76' | Stadium: Al-Ittihad Stadium; Attendance: 300 |

| 26 July 2004 Friendly | South Korea | 1–1 | Paraguay XI | Goyang, South Korea |
| 19:00 | Cho Jae-jin 3' | | Bogado 90+1' | Stadium: Goyang Stadium; Attendance: 30,818 |

| 19 December 2009 Friendly | South Korea | 1–2 | Japan U20 | Changwon, South Korea |
| 15:00 KST (UTC+09) | Cho Young-cheol 36' | Report | Yamada 77', 88' | Stadium: Changwon Football Center; Attendance: 13,277; Referee: Huang Junjie (China PR) |

== See also ==
- South Korea national under-23 football team results
