= Lee Young-jun (footballer) =

Korean association football player

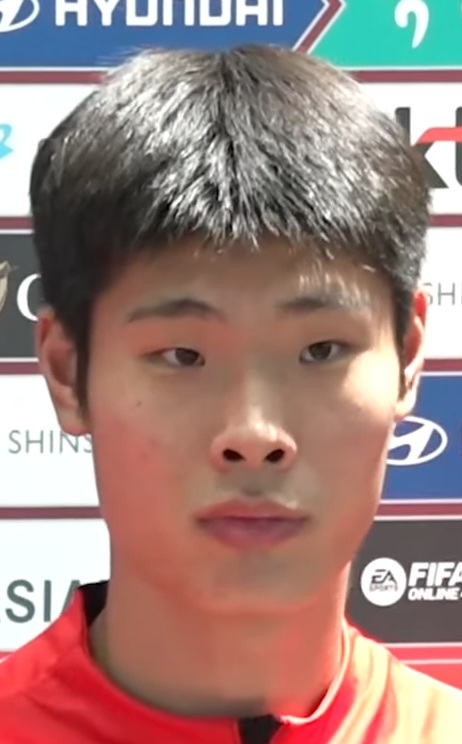
- Lee in 2023

Personal information
- Full name: Lee Young-jun
- Date of birth: 23 May 2003 (age 23)
- Place of birth: Suwon, South Korea
- Height: 1.93 m (6 ft 4 in)
- Position: Striker

Team information
- Current team: Grasshopper
- Number: 18

Youth career
- 2013–2016: Suwon Samsung Bluewings
- 2017: Anseong FC
- ?: FC OSAN
- 2019: Eonnam High School
- 2019–2020: Shinpyeong High School

Senior career*
Years	Team	Apps	(Gls)
2021–2024	Suwon FC	29	(1)
2023–2024	→ Gimcheon Sangmu (draft)	21	(4)
2024–	Grasshopper	44	(9)
2025	Grasshopper II	1	(1)

International career^{‡}
2022–2023	South Korea U20	22	(10)
2022–	South Korea U23	13	(8)
Medal record
Men's football
Representing South Korea
Asian Games
Gold medal – first place	2026 Aichi–Nagoya
WAFF U-23 Championship
Winner	2024 Saudi Arabia
- * Club domestic league appearances and goals as of 1 November 2026 ‡ National team caps and goals as of 3 October 2026

- Lee Young-jun
- Hangul: 이영준
- RR: I Yeongjun
- MR: I Yŏngjun

Lee Young-jun (Korean: 이영준; born 23 May 2003) is a South Korean footballer who plays as a striker for Swiss Super League club Grasshopper.

== Club career ==
On 29 July 2024, Lee signed a four-year contract with Swiss Super League side Grasshopper. On 24 August, he scored within 44 seconds in a 3–1 victory over Sion, where he made his debut. On 27 May 2025, he scored the opener in the relegation play-off first leg against Aarau. Grasshopper avoided relegation after defeating Aarau 4–1 on aggregate.

During the 2025–26 season, Lee made only 15 league appearances due to a long-term injury. The club once again faced Aarau in the relegation play-off. In the play-off second leg, he provided an assist for Lovro Zvonarek's opener, but was sent off in the 88th minute for kneeing Leon Frokaj in the face. Grasshopper won 2–1 after extra time, and he apologized to his team and fans on Instagram.

== International career ==
Lee played for the South Korean national under-20 team in the 2023 FIFA U-20 World Cup. He scored against France and Ecuador while helping his team reach the semi-finals.

On 26 March 2024, Lee scored South Korea's first goal in the 2024 WAFF U-23 Championship final, where South Korea defeated Australia on penalties.

Lee led South Korea to the quarter-finals with he scoring three goals in the 2024 AFC U-23 Asian Cup, but he was sent off for his unsportsmanlike foul in the quarter-final match against Indonesia, where South Korea was eliminated.

== Career statistics ==
=== Club ===
As of 1 November 2026

Appearances and goals by club, season and competition
Club	Season	League			National cup		Continental		Other		Total	
Club	Season	Division	Apps	Goals	Apps	Goals	Apps	Goals	Apps	Goals	Apps	Goals
Suwon FC	2021	K League 1	13	0	1	0	—		—		14	0
Suwon FC	2022	K League 1	16	1	1	0	—		—		17	1
Suwon FC	Total		29	1	2	0	—		—		31	1
Gimcheon Sangmu (draft)	2023	K League 2	13	3	2	1	—		—		15	4
Gimcheon Sangmu (draft)	2024	K League 1	8	1	0	0	—		—		8	1
Gimcheon Sangmu (draft)	Total		21	4	2	1	—		—		23	5
Grasshopper	2024–25	Swiss Super League	20	3	1	0	—		1 (Note: Appearances in Swiss Super League relegation play-off)	1	22	4
Grasshopper	2025–26	Swiss Super League	15	3	3	0	—		2	0	20	3
Grasshopper	2026–27	Swiss Super League	9	3	2	3	—		—		11	6
Grasshopper	Total		44	9	6	3	—		3	1	53	13
Grasshopper II	2024–25	1. Liga Classic	1	1	—		—		—		1	1
Career total			95	15	10	4	—		3	1	108	20

== Honours ==
Gimcheon Sangmu

- K League 2: 2023

South Korea U23

- WAFF U-23 Championship: 2024
- Asian Games: 2026
