= An Jae-jun (footballer, born 2001) =

South Korean footballer (born 2001)

Personal information
- Date of birth: 3 April 2001 (age 25)
- Place of birth: South Korea
- Height: 1.85 m (6 ft 1 in)
- Position: Forward

Team information
- Current team: Pohang Steelers
- Number: 20

Youth career
- 2014–2016: Hyundai Middle School
- 2017–2019: Hyundai Senior High School

Senior career*
Years	Team	Apps	(Gls)
2020	Ulsan Hyundai	0	(0)
2020	→ Mladá Boleslav (loan)	1	(0)
2020	→ Dukla Prague B (loan)	5	(0)
2021–2024	Bucheon FC 1995	75	(16)
2024–	Pohang Steelers	23	(1)

International career^{‡}
2016–2017	South Korea U17	9	(5)
2019	South Korea U20	5	(2)
2022–	South Korea U23	12	(5)
Medal record
Men's football
Representing South Korea
Asian Games
Gold medal – first place	2022 Hangzhou	Team
- * Club domestic league appearances and goals as of 3 August 2026 ‡ National team caps and goals as of 7 October 2023

- An Jae-jun
- Hangul: 안재준
- RR: An Jaejun
- MR: An Chaejun

An Jae-jun (Korean: 안재준; born 3 April 2001) is a South Korean footballer who plays as a forward for Pohang Steelers in the K League 1.

== Career statistics ==
As of 22 September 2023

Appearances and goals by club, season and competition
Club	Season	League			Korean FA Cup		Asia		Play-offs		Total	
Club	Season	Division	Apps	Goals	Apps	Goals	Apps	Goals	Apps	Goals	Apps	Goals
Mladá Boleslav (loan)	2019–20	Czech First League	1	0	0	0	—		—		1	0
Dukla Prague B (loan)	2020-21	Bohemian Football League	5	0	0	0	—		—		5	0
Bucheon FC 1995	2021	K League 2	19	0	2	1	—		—		21	1
Bucheon FC 1995	2022	K League 2	24	4	3	1	—		—		27	5
Bucheon FC 1995	2023	K League 2	19	8	0	0	—		—		19	8
Career total			67	12	5	2	0	0	0	0	72	14

== Honours ==
South Korea U23

- Asian Games: 2022

Individual

- K League Young Player of the Year (K League 2): 2023
