= Jung Seung-bae =

South Korean footballer (born 2003)

- Jung in 2025

Personal information
- Date of birth: November 9, 2003 (age 22)
- Place of birth: Daejeon, South Korea
- Height: 1.72 m (5 ft 8 in)
- Position: Striker

Team information
- Current team: Suwon FC
- Number: 70

Youth career
- Daejeon Hana Citizen U12
- Yuseong Middle School (youth)

Senior career*
Years	Team	Apps	(Gls)
2024–	Suwon FC	45	(7)

International career
2022	South Korea U20	2	(1)
2025–	South Korea U23	7	(1)
Korean name
Hangul	정승배
RR	Jeong Seungbae
MR	Chŏng Sŭngbae
- * Club domestic league appearances and goals as of November 1, 2026

Jung Seung-bae (Korean: 정승배; born November 9, 2003) is a South Korean professional footballer who plays as a striker for K League 2 club Suwon FC. He made his debut appearance in the 2024 K League 1 season.

== Early life and career beginnings ==
Jung Seung-bae was born on November 9, 2003. A native of Daejeon, he played for Daejeon Hana Citizen's U-12 team, joined the U-15 team during his tenure at Yuseong Middle School, and attended Yeouido High School in Seoul. He attended Hannam University and competed in the U-League. He became the top scorer that season, contributing 14 goals in 15 appearances. He was also called up for the Denso Cup squad.

At the finals of the 17th Baekdudaegan Cup 1st and 2nd Year Football Federation Tournament, Jung contributed the first goal of the match against Korea University, contributing to a 4–3 victory and earning Hannam University's first championship in its history. At the finals the following year, Jung contributed a goal for the institution against Ajou University in a 2–2 draw, ultimately winning the Baekdudaegan Cup for a second consecutive year with 3–2 on penalties. He also scored twice in the final of the 59th Taebaeksan Cup at the Autumn University Football Federation Tournament against Hongik University, securing a 4–2 victory and Hannam's third title of the year. With four goals, the most among all players in the tournament, Jung earned the Top Scorer Award.

== Senior career ==
Jung signed with K League 1 club Suwon FC ahead of the 2024 season. He made his first professional appearance in a match against FC Seoul on April 30. On his 21st birthday, Jung scored his first league goal in a 4–0 victory against Gangwon FC. He scored his second goal in the 2025 season in a 1–1 draw against Gimcheon Sangmu FC. Due to limited playing opportunities in his first two season, Jung made 10 and 14 appearances, respectively.

Following Suwon FC's relegation to the second division in 2026, Jung made more appearances and was described as a "valuable asset" to the team for his aggressive dribbling and ability to break through opposition defenses on the flanks. By the end of October, he scored five goals and provided three assists.

== International career ==
In 2022, Jung was called up to the South Korea national under-20 football team. At the 2024 Maurice Revello Tournament, he scored both goals in a 2–1 victory against Indonesia. Ahead of the 2026 AFC U-23 Asian Cup, Jung withdrew from the national U-22 team after sustaining an ankle injury. As of 2025, he returned to the under-23 team after replacing Kim Ji-soo following a hamstring injury. Jung scored a goal in the opening match of the 2025 Panda Cup, aiding the team to the 2–0 victory against Uzbekistan.

== Style of play ==
Jung played as a central midfielder or in the flanks in his youth, transitioning into a striker in his collegiate career. He cites Sergio Agüero as his role model.

== Career statistics ==
=== Club ===
As of November 1, 2026.

Appearances and goals by club, season and competition
Club	Season	League			Cup		Continental		Other		Total	
Club	Season	Division	Apps	Goals	Apps	Goals	Apps	Goals	Apps	Goals	Apps	Goals
Suwon FC	2024	K League 1	10	1	0	0	0	0	0	0	10	1
Suwon FC	2025	K League 1	14	1	2	1	0	0	0	0	16	1
Suwon FC	2026	K League 2	21	5	0	0	0	0	0	0	21	5
Career total			45	7	2	1	0	0	0	0	47	8
