= Jang Seok-hwan =

South Korean footballer (born 2004)

Personal information
- Date of birth: 11 October 2004 (age 22)
- Place of birth: Ansan, Gyeonggi, South Korea
- Height: 1.80 m (5 ft 11 in)
- Position: Left-back

Team information
- Current team: Gwangju FC (on loan from Suwon Bluewings)
- Number: 2

Youth career
- 2013–2016: Ansan Hwarang Elementary School
- 2017–2019: Yongin FC
- 2020–2022: Yongin Football Center
- 2023–2024: Suwon Bluewings

Senior career*
Years	Team	Apps	(Gls)
2024–	Suwon Bluewings	24	(0)
2026–	→ Gwangju FC (loan)	4	(0)

International career^{‡}
2019	South Korea U15	5	(1)
2020	South Korea U16	3	(0)
2024–	South Korea U23	2	(0)
- * Club domestic league appearances and goals as of 4 August 2026 ‡ National team caps and goals as of 11 October 2024

- Jang Seok-hwan
- Hangul: 장석환
- RR: Jang Seokhwan
- MR: Chang Sŏkhwan

Jang Seok-hwan (Korean: 장석환; born 11 October 2004) is a South Korean footballer who currently plays as a left-back for Gwangju FC, on loan from Suwon Bluewings.

== Club career ==
In June 2021, while at the Yongin Football Center, Jang was invited by German side Bayern Munich to be part of their World Squad initiative, representing the club in international friendlies. Ahead of the 2023 season, he was announced as a new signing for then-K League 1 side Suwon Bluewings. After no appearances in his first season, he made his professional debut in March 2024 against Seoul E-Land.

== International career ==
Jang was called up to the South Korea under-23 side for the 2024 Maurice Revello Tournament.

== Career statistics ==
=== Club ===
As of 11 October 2024

Appearances and goals by club, season and competition
Club	Season	League			Cup		Playoffs		Total	
Club	Season	Division	Apps	Goals	Apps	Goals	Apps	Goals	Apps	Goals
Suwon Bluewings	2024	K League 2	15	0	1 (Note: Appearances in the Korean FA Cup)	0	0	0	16	0
Career total			15	0	1	0	0	0	16	0
