= Kang Seong-jin =

South Korean footballer (born 2003)

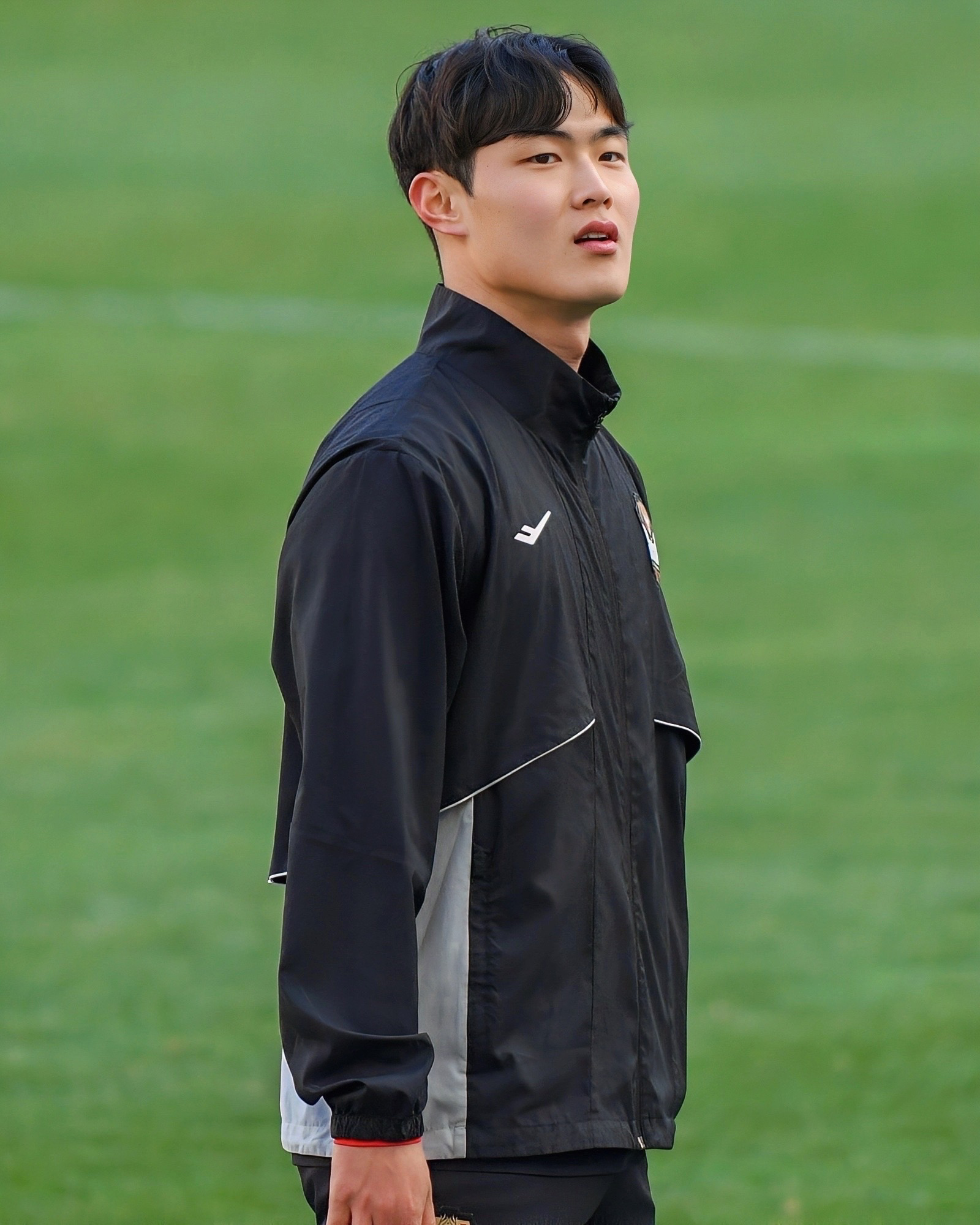
- Kang in 2025

Personal information
- Date of birth: 26 March 2003 (age 23)
- Place of birth: Seoul, South Korea
- Height: 1.80 m (5 ft 11 in)
- Positions: Winger; attacking midfielder

Team information
- Current team: Suwon Samsung Bluewings
- Number: 22

Youth career
- 2016–2021: FC Seoul

Senior career*
Years	Team	Apps	(Gls)
2021–2025	FC Seoul	82	(6)
2025	→ Suwon Samsung Bluewings (loan)	13	(1)
2026–	Suwon Samsung Bluewings	8	(1)

International career^{‡}
2018–2019	South Korea U17	7	(5)
2022–2023	South Korea U20	14	(3)
2022–	South Korea U23	21	(3)
2022–	South Korea	2	(2)
Medal record
Men's football
Representing South Korea
EAFF Championship
Runner-up	2022 Japan
WAFF U-23 Championship
Winner	2024 Saudi Arabia
- * Club domestic league appearances and goals as of 5 August 2026 ‡ National team caps and goals as of 20 January 2026

Kang Seong-jin (Korean: 강성진; born 26 March 2003) is a South Korean professional footballer who plays as a winger or an attacking midfielder for Suwon Samsung Bluewings and the South Korea national team.

== Club career ==
A youth player of FC Seoul, Kang joined the club's senior team in 2021 and became the first semi-professional footballer in the club's history. He made his K League 1 debut in a match against Seongnam FC on 10 March 2020. He had his first assist in the Super Match against Suwon Samsung Bluewings on 26 September, and his first goal against Gwangju FC on 3 November.

== International career ==
Kang was part of the South Korea squad at the 2022 EAFF Championship. He played two matches against China and Hong Kong, and scored two goals against the latter.

Kang evaded three Jordanian players and scored a goal after starting a dribble from inside his own half in an AFC U-20 Asian Cup match on 5 March 2023. His solo goal was nominated for the FIFA Puskás Award.

== Career statistics ==
=== Club ===
As of 9 November 2025

Club	Season	League			Cup		Continental		Other		Total	
Club	Season	Division	Apps	Goals	Apps	Goals	Apps	Goals	Apps	Goals	Apps	Goals
FC Seoul	2021	K League 1	14	1	0	0	—		—		14	1
FC Seoul	2022	K League 1	34	1	6	0	—		—		40	1
FC Seoul	2023	K League 1	7	2	1	1	—		—		8	3
FC Seoul	2024	K League 1	22	2	2	1	—		—		24	3
FC Seoul	2025	K League 1	5	0	1	1	—		—		6	1
FC Seoul	Total		82	6	10	3	—		—		92	9
Suwon Samsung Bluewings (loan)	2025	K League 2	13	1	—		—		—		13	1
Career total			95	7	10	3	—		—		105	10

=== International ===
Scores and results list South Korea's goal tally first.

List of international goals scored by Kang Seong-jin
No	Date	Venue	Opponent	Score	Result	Competition
1	24 July 2022	Toyota Stadium, Toyota, Japan	Hong Kong	1–0	3–0	2022 EAFF Championship
2	24 July 2022	Toyota Stadium, Toyota, Japan	Hong Kong	3–0	3–0	2022 EAFF Championship

== Honours ==
South Korea U23

- WAFF U-23 Championship: 2024

South Korea

- EAFF Championship runner-up: 2022
