= Seo Myung-gwan =

South Korean footballer (born 2002)

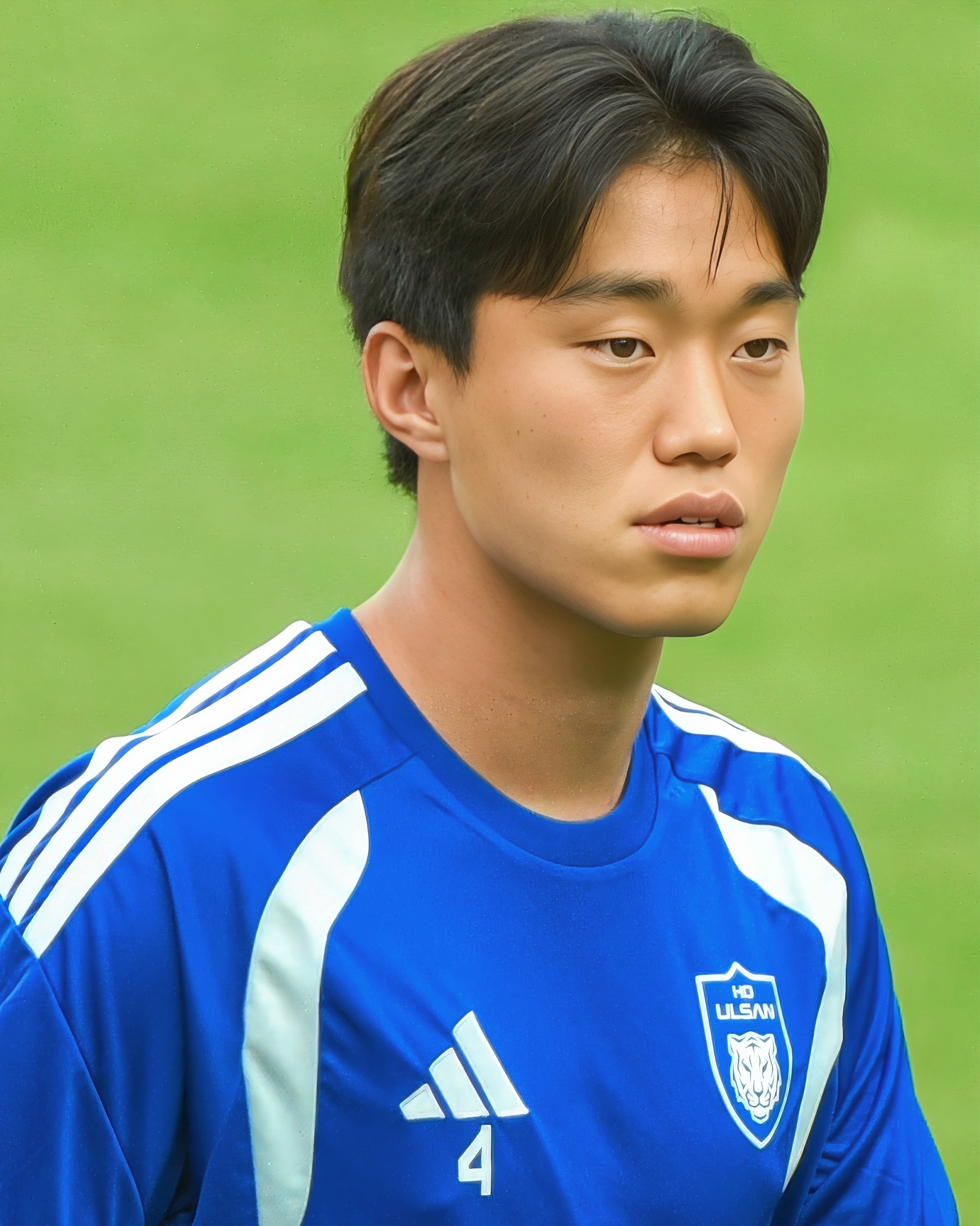
- Seo with Ulsan HD in 2026

Personal information
- Date of birth: 23 November 2002 (age 23)
- Place of birth: Gongju, Chungnam, South Korea
- Height: 1.86 m (6 ft 1 in)
- Position: Centre-back

Team information
- Current team: Ulsan HD
- Number: 4

Youth career
- 2018–2020: Yuseong High School
- 2021–2022: Ajou University

Senior career*
Years	Team	Apps	(Gls)
2023–2024	Bucheon FC 1995	51	(0)
2025–	Ulsan HD	31	(1)

International career^{‡}
2023–	South Korea U23	7	(0)
2025–	South Korea	1	(0)
Korean name
Hangul	서명관
RR	Seo Myeonggwan
MR	Sŏ Myŏnggwan
- * Club domestic league appearances and goals as of 3 August 2026 ‡ National team caps and goals as of 11 July 2025

Seo Myung-gwan (Korean: 서명관; born 23 November 2002) is a South Korean footballer who plays as a centre-back for Ulsan HD in the K League 1 and the South Korea national team.

== Club career ==
He joined Bucheon FC 1995 in 2022.

He joined Ulsan HD in 2025.

== Career statistics ==
As of 13 May 2026

Appearances and goals by club, season and competition
Club	Season	League			Korean FA Cup		Continental		Other		Total	
Club	Season	Division	Apps	Goals	Apps	Goals	Apps	Goals	Apps	Goals	Apps	Goals
Bucheon FC 1995	2023	K League 2	30	0	0	0	—		—		30	0
Bucheon FC 1995	2024	K League 2	21	0	0	0	—		—		21	0
Bucheon FC 1995	Total		51	0	0	0	—		—		51	0
Ulsan HD	2025	K League 1	21	1	2	0	6 (Note: Appearances in AFC Champions League Elite)	0	1 (Note: Appearances in FIFA Club World Cup)	0	30	1
Ulsan HD	2026	K League 1	5	0	0	0	1	0	—		6	0
Ulsan HD	Total		26	1	2	0	7	0	1	0	36	1
Career total			77	1	2	0	7	0	1	0	87	1
