= Kim Myung-jun =

South Korean footballer (born 2006)

Personal information
- Date of birth: 21 March 2006 (age 20)
- Place of birth: Icheon, South Korea
- Height: 1.82 m (6 ft 0 in)
- Position: Striker

Team information
- Current team: Jong Genk
- Number: 89

Youth career
- Pohang Steelers

Senior career*
| Years | Team | Apps | (Gls) |
| 2024 | Pohang Steelers | 2 | (0) |
| 2025– | Jong Genk | 26 | (5) |

International career^{‡}
| 2022–2023 | South Korea U17 | 23 | (9) |
| 2024–2025 | South Korea U20 | 9 | (3) |
| 2025– | South Korea U23 | 9 | (5) |
Medal record
Men's football
Representing South Korea
Asian Games
| Gold medal – first place | 2026 Aichi–Nagoya |
AFC U-17 Asian Cup
| Runner-up | 2023 Thailand |
- * Club domestic league appearances and goals as of 11 October 2026 ‡ National team caps and goals as of 3 October 2026

Kim Myung-jun (Korean: 김명준; born 21 March 2006) is a South Korean professional footballer who plays as a striker for Challenger Pro League club Jong Genk.

On 11 October 2023, he was named by English newspaper The Guardian as one of the best players born in 2006 worldwide.

== Club career ==
After playing for academies of Pohang Steelers, Kim joined Jong Genk, the reserve team of Belgian Pro League club Genk, in January 2025.

== International career ==
Kim represented South Korea at the 2023 FIFA U-17 World Cup, scoring two goals in the group stage of the tournament.

== Career statistics ==
=== Club ===
As of match played 11 October 2026

Appearances and goals by club, season and competition
| Club | Season | League | | | National cup | | Continental | | Other | | Total | |
| Club | Season | Division | Apps | Goals | Apps | Goals | Apps | Goals | Apps | Goals | Apps | Goals |
|---|---|---|---|---|---|---|---|---|---|---|---|---|
| Pohang Steelers | 2024 | K League 1 | 2 | 0 | 0 | 0 | 2 (Note: Appearances in AFC Champions League Elite) | 0 | — | | 4 | 0 |
| Jong Genk | 2024–25 | Challenger Pro League | 4 | 0 | — | | — | | — | | 4 | 0 |
| Jong Genk | 2025–26 | Challenger Pro League | 17 | 1 | — | | — | | — | | 17 | 1 |
| Jong Genk | 2026–27 | Challenger Pro League | 5 | 4 | — | | — | | — | | 5 | 4 |
| Jong Genk | Total | | 26 | 5 | — | | — | | — | | 26 | 5 |
| Career total | | | 28 | 5 | 0 | 0 | 2 | 0 | 0 | 0 | 30 | 5 |

== Honours ==
South Korea U17

- AFC U-17 Asian Cup runner-up: 2023

South Korea U23

- Asian Games: 2026
