= South Korea national under-23 football team =

National football team in South Korea

Korea Republic U-23
- Nickname(s): Taegeuk Warriors; Tigers of Asia
- Association: Korea Football Association (KFA)
- Confederation: AFC (Asia)
- Sub-confederation: EAFF (East Asia)
- Head coach: Kim Eun-jung
- Most caps: Kim Do-heon (39)
- Top scorer: Choi Yong-soo (18); Hwang Ui-jo (18)
- FIFA code: KOR
First colours	Second colours

First international
- South Korea 5–0 Indonesia (Masan, South Korea; 24 March 1991)

Biggest win
- South Korea 10–0 Philippines (Seoul, South Korea; 18 May 1991); South Korea 10–0 Philippines (Yangon, Myanmar; 30 June 2012); South Korea 10–0 Macau (Ho Chi Minh City, Vietnam; 19 July 2017)

Biggest defeat
- Saudi Arabia 4–0 South Korea (Al-Ahsa, Saudi Arabia; 10 October 2025)

Olympic Games
- Appearances: 8 (first in 1992)
- Best result: Bronze medalists (2012)

Asian Games
- Appearances: 7 (first in 2002)
- Best result: Gold medalists (2014, 2018, 2022, 2026)

AFC U-23 Asian Cup
- Appearances: 7 (first in 2013)
- Best result: Champions (2020)
Medal record
Olympic Games
Bronze medal – third place	2012 London
Asian Games
Gold medal – first place	2014 Incheon
Gold medal – first place	2018 Jakarta-Palembang
Gold medal – first place	2022 Hangzhou
Gold medal – first place	2026 Aichi-Nagoya
Bronze medal – third place	2002 Busan
Bronze medal – third place	2010 Guangzhou
AFC U-23 Asian Cup
Winner	2020 Thailand
Runner-up	2016 Qatar
WAFF U-23 Championship
Winner	2024 Saudi Arabia

The South Korea national under-23 football team (Korean: 대한민국 23세 이하 축구 국가대표팀; recognized as Korea Republic by FIFA, and Republic of Korea by IOC) represents South Korea at football in the Olympic Games and Asian Games. It was founded when the Olympic football was changed to an under-23 competition. It also can be managed as an under-21 or under-22 team if necessary.

== History ==
=== London Generation ===
Under manager Hong Myung-bo, the South Korean under-23 team participated at the 2012 Summer Olympics in London. In the group stage, South Korea qualified for the quarter-finals as runners-up of their group by beating Switzerland 2–1 and drawing with Mexico and Gabon in two goalless matches. In the quarter-finals, South Korea met hosts Great Britain. South Korean forward Ji Dong-won scored the opening goal, but British midfielder Aaron Ramsey scored a penalty equaliser. Ramsey once again had a penalty chance four minutes after his penalty goal, but South Korea's over-aged goalkeeper Jung Sung-ryong blocked it. However, Jung was injured in a collision with Micah Richards in the middle of the second half, and was replaced by Lee Bum-young. Nevertheless, Lee did not concede a goal until the end of extra time, and made a save from the shot of Britain's fifth kicker Daniel Sturridge in the penalty shoot-out. South Korea beat Great Britain 5–4 on penalties and Lee was praised by finishing the game successfully, but the compliments turned to criticisms after the semi-finals. He conceded three goals against Brazil, failing to perform his role. After being eliminated by a 3–0 loss to Brazil, South Korea competed with their historical rival Japan for a bronze medal. Their over-aged striker Park Chu-young scored the opening goal with a solo effort against three Japanese defenders, and Koo Ja-cheol scored an additional goal, a decisive one for the victory. South Korea won their first-ever medal in Olympic football after defeating Japan 2–0, and the medalists were exempted from mandatory military service according to the laws of the country. They were called the "London Generation" in South Korea, and most of them played for the senior team in the 2014 FIFA World Cup in Brazil, where they were eliminated after finishing last in their group.

== Recent results and fixtures ==
The following is a list of match results in the last 12 months, as well as any future matches that have been scheduled.

Win Draw Loss Fixture

=== 2026 ===
7 January 2026 AFC U-23 Asian Cup GS	South Korea	0–0	Iran	Riyadh, Saudi Arabia
14:30 UTC+3		Report		Stadium: Al-Shabab Club Stadium; Attendance: 127; Referee: Ammar Mahfoodh (Bahrain)

10 January 2026 AFC U-23 Asian Cup GS	Lebanon	2–4	South Korea	Riyadh, Saudi Arabia
14:30 UTC+3	Shahin 13'; El Fadl 48'	Report	Lee Hyun-yong 20'; Jeong Jae-sang 56'; Kang Seong-jin 71'; Kim Tae-won 76'	Stadium: Al-Shabab Club Stadium; Attendance: 588; Referee: Abdulla Al-Marri (Qatar)

13 January 2026 AFC U-23 Asian Cup GS	Uzbekistan	2–0	South Korea	Riyadh, Saudi Arabia
14:30 UTC+3	Karimov 48'; Saidnurullaev 70'	Report		Stadium: Prince Faisal bin Fahd Sports City Stadium; Attendance: 139; Referee: Qasim Al-Hatmi (Oman)

17 January 2026 AFC U-23 Asian Cup QF	Australia	1–2	South Korea	Jeddah, Saudi Arabia
18:30 UTC+3	Jovanovic 51'	Report	Baek Ga-on 21'; Shin Min-ha 88'	Stadium: King Abdullah Sports City Hall Stadium; Attendance: 172; Referee: Fu Ming (China)

20 January 2026 AFC U-23 Asian Cup SF	Japan	1–0	South Korea	Jeddah, Saudi Arabia
14:30 UTC+3	Koizumi 36'	Report		Stadium: King Abdullah Sports City Hall Stadium; Attendance: 188; Referee: Abdulla Al-Marri (Qatar)

23 January 2026 AFC U-23 Asian Cup 3rd	Vietnam	2–2 (a.e.t.) (7–6 p)	South Korea	Jeddah, Saudi Arabia
18:00 UTC+3	Nguyễn Quốc Việt 30'; Nguyễn Đình Bắc 71'	Report	Kim Tae-won 69'; Shin Min-ha 90+7'	Stadium: King Abdullah Sports City Hall Stadium; Attendance: 270; Referee: Abdullah Jamali (Kuwait)
	Penalties
	Khuất Văn Khang (penalty scored); Phạm Minh Phúc (penalty scored); Nguyễn Thái Quốc Cường (penalty scored); Nguyễn Ngọc Mỹ (penalty scored); Nguyễn Nhật Minh (penalty scored); Nguyễn Xuân Bắc (penalty scored); Nguyễn Thanh Nhàn (penalty scored)		(penalty scored) Kim Tae-won; (penalty scored) Kang Seong-jin; (penalty scored) Lee Chan-ouk; (penalty scored) Kim Yong-hak; (penalty scored) Lee Hyun-yong; (penalty scored) Jang Seok-hwan; (penalty missed) Bae Hyun-seo

29 March Friendly	South Korea	2–1	Japan	Cheonan, South Korea
17:00 UTC+9	Lee Young-jun 34', 49'	Report	Ishii 77'	Stadium: Korea Football Park

31 March Friendly	South Korea	1–4	United States	Cheonan, South Korea
19:00 UTC+9	Park Seung-ho 12' (pen.)	Report	Baker-Whiting 7', 33'; Brennan 15'; Castañeda 80'	Stadium: Korea Football Park

3 June Friendly	South Korea	1–1	United Arab Emirates	Thanyaburi, Thailand
20:00 UTC+7	Lee Seung-won 47'	Report	Saleh 50'	Stadium: True BG Stadium

6 June Friendly	Thailand	2–3	South Korea	Thanyaburi, Thailand
20:00 UTC+7	Buaphan 3'; Chansri 16'	Report	Kang Seong-jin 10'; Lee Young-jun 49'; Choi Woo-jin 79'	Stadium: True BG Stadium

9 June Friendly	South Korea	0–1	Kyrgyzstan	Thanyaburi, Thailand
20:00 UTC+7		Report	Madanov 81'	Stadium: True BG Stadium

15 September 2026 Asian Games GS	Qatar	1–4	South Korea	Nagoya, Japan
19:30 UTC+9	Sherif 85'	Report	Eom Ji-sung 7', 20', 45+1'; Kim Myung-jun 66'	Stadium: Paloma Mizuho Rugby Stadium; Attendance: 1,633; Referee: Adam Kersey (Australia)

22 September 2026 Asian Games GS	South Korea	2–0	Saudi Arabia	Nagoya, Japan
19:00 UTC+9	Shin Min-ha 67'; Kim Myung-jun 69'	Report		Stadium: Paloma Mizuho Rugby Stadium; Attendance: 1,042; Referee: Hiroki Kasahara (Japan)

25 September 2026 Asian Games QF	South Korea	4–0	Vietnam	Nagoya, Japan
19:30 UTC+9	Lee Young-jun 15', 81'; Kim Ji-soo 77'; Kim Myung-jun 88'	Report		Stadium: Paloma Mizuho Rugby Stadium; Attendance: 2,167; Referee: Firdavs Nosafarov (Uzbekistan)

30 September 2026 Asian Games SF	South Korea	2–1	China	Osaka, Japan
15:00 UTC+9	Lee Young-jun 33'; Bae Jun-ho 82'	Report	Wang Yudong 22'	Stadium: Nagai Stadium; Attendance: 4,470; Referee: Sadullo Gulmurodi (Tajikistan)

3 October 2026 Asian Games Final	South Korea	1–0	Japan	Toyota, Japan
19:30 UTC+9	Eom Ji-sung 61'	Report		Stadium: Toyota Stadium; Attendance: 30,086; Referee: Adam Kersey (Australia)

3 October Friendly	Australia	1–2	South Korea	Gosford, Australia
15:00 UTC+10	Kim Min-soo 19' (o.g.)	Report	Ha Jeong-woo 2'; Yoon Do-young 39' (pen.)	Stadium: polytec Stadium

6 October Friendly	Australia	2–2	South Korea	Gosford, Australia
13:00 UTC+10	Di Pizio 45+5'; Akon 73'	Report	Sung Ye-geon 12'; Kim Ye-geon 36'	Stadium: polytec Stadium

14 November Friendly	South Korea	0–0	Mexico	Cheonan, South Korea
16:00 UTC+9		Report		Stadium: Korea Football Park

17 November Friendly	South Korea	0–0	Mexico	Cheonan, South Korea
19:00 UTC+9		Report		Stadium: Cheonan Stadium

== All-time results ==
As of 6 October 2026

Results by decade
Year	Pld	W	D	L	Win %	Matches
1991–1999	93	56	22	15	60.22	Matches
2000–2009	79	52	15	12	65.82	Matches
2010–2019	119	73	29	17	61.34	Matches
2020–present	86	52	13	21	60.47	Matches
Total	377	233	79	65	61.80	—

== Coaching staff ==
=== Current personnel ===
As of 5 October 2026

Position	Name
Manager	(South Korea) Kim Eun-jung
Assistant coach	(South Korea) Kim Tae-min
Coach	(South Korea) Lee Sang-don
Goalkeeping coach	(South Korea) Chung Yoo-suk

=== Manager history ===
As of 17 November 2026

Caretaker manager

No.	Manager	Year	Pld	W	D	L	Win %	Competition(s)
1	(South Korea) Kim Sam-rak	1991–1992	30	21	6	3	70.00	1992 Summer Olympics group stage
2	(Russia) Anatoliy Byshovets	1994–1996	43	19	14	10	44.19	1996 Summer Olympics group stage
3	(South Korea) Huh Jung-moo	1998–2000	30	25	2	3	83.33	2000 Summer Olympics group stage
4	(South Korea) Park Hang-seo	2002	9	7	2	0	77.78	2002 Asian Games bronze medal
5	(South Korea) Kim Ho-kon	2003–2004	31	19	6	6	61.29	2004 Summer Olympics quarter-finals
6	(Netherlands) Pim Verbeek	2006–2007	15	10	2	3	66.67	2006 Asian Games fourth place
7	(South Korea) Park Sung-hwa	2007–2008	13	7	5	1	53.85	2008 Summer Olympics group stage
8	(South Korea) Hong Myung-bo	2009–2012	32	19	8	5	59.38	2010 Asian Games bronze medal 2012 Summer Olympics bronze medal
—	(South Korea) Kim Tae-young (Note: Managed separate under-21 team in the 2013 AFC U-22 Championship qualification.)	2012	5	4	1	0	80.00	—
—	(South Korea) Chung Jung-yong	2012	2	1	0	1	50.00	—
9	(South Korea) Lee Kwang-jong	2013–2015	22	12	5	5	54.55	2013 AFC U-22 Championship fourth place 2014 Asian Games gold medal
—	(South Korea) Choi Moon-sik (Note: Managed under-22 team as a caretaker in the 2015 King's Cup because former manager Lee Kwang-jong urgently resigned from the team due to his acute leukemia.)	2015	3	2	1	0	66.67	—
10	(South Korea) Shin Tae-yong	2015–2016	30	18	9	3	60.00	2016 AFC U-23 Championship runner-up 2016 Summer Olympics quarter-finals
—	(South Korea) Chung Jung-yong	2017	3	2	1	0	66.67	—
11	(South Korea) Kim Bong-gil	2017–2018	6	3	1	2	50.00	2018 AFC U-23 Championship fourth place
12	(South Korea) Kim Hak-bum	2018–2021	33	22	5	6	66.67	2018 Asian Games gold medal 2020 AFC U-23 Championship champion 2020 Summer Olympics quarter-finals
13	(South Korea) Hwang Sun-hong	2021–2024	31	23	3	5	74.19	2022 AFC U-23 Asian Cup quarter-finals 2022 Asian Games gold medal 2024 AFC U-23 Asian Cup quarter-finals
—	(South Korea) Myung Jae-yong	2024	3	2	1	0	66.67	2024 WAFF U-23 Championship champion
—	(South Korea) Choi Jae-young	2024	5	1	1	3	20.00	—
—	(South Korea) Lee Chang-hyun	2025	3	1	1	1	33.33	—
14	(South Korea) Lee Min-sung	2025–2026	26	14	4	8	53.85	2026 AFC U-23 Asian Cup fourth place 2026 Asian Games gold medal
15	(South Korea) Kim Eun-jung	2026–present	4	1	3	0	25.00	
Total			379	233	81	65	61.48	—

== Players ==
=== Current squad ===
The following players were called up for the friendly matches against Mexico on 14 and 17 November 2026.

No.	Pos.	Player	Date of birth (age)	Club
	GK	Kim Min-seung	9 February 2005 (age 21)	(Korea Football Association) Paju Frontier
	GK	Kim Min-soo	8 July 2005 (age 21)	(Korea Football Association) Daejeon Hana Citizen
	GK	Park Sang-young	17 September 2005 (age 21)	(Korea Football Association) Gimcheon Sangmu
	DF	Kim Seo-jin	7 January 2005 (age 21)	(Korea Football Association) Gimcheon Sangmu
	DF	Ham Sun-woo	28 January 2005 (age 21)	(Korea Football Association) Hwaseong FC
	DF	Lee Geon-hee	11 March 2005 (age 21)	(Korea Football Association) Suwon Samsung Bluewings
	DF	Shin Il-yeon	17 July 2005 (age 21)	(Korea Football Association) Chungnam Asan
	DF	Choi Seung-gu	28 September 2005 (age 21)	(Korea Football Association) Incheon United
	DF	Park Sang-hyoun	14 October 2005 (age 21)	(Korea Football Association) Gimpo FC
	DF	Kwon Gi-min	27 October 2005 (age 21)	(Korea Football Association) Jeju SK
	DF	Park Min-jae	30 November 2005 (age 20)	(Korea Football Association) Jeju SK
	DF	Kang Min-woo	2 March 2006 (age 20)	(Japan Football Association) Kataller Toyama
	DF	Ko Jong-hyun	11 April 2006 (age 20)	(Korea Football Association) Suwon Samsung Bluewings
	DF	Han Jae-bin	4 November 2006 (age 20)	(Korea Football Association) Jeonbuk Hyundai Motors
	MF	Park Hye-sung	9 April 2005 (age 21)	(Korea Football Association) Busan IPark
	MF	Son Seung-min	9 May 2005 (age 21)	(Korea Football Association) Daegu FC
	MF	Min Si-young	21 June 2005 (age 21)	(Korea Football Association) Ulsan University
	MF	Sung Ye-geon	30 October 2005 (age 21)	(Korea Football Association) Bucheon FC 1995
	MF	Lee Chang-woo	12 March 2006 (age 20)	(Korea Football Association) Pohang Steelers
	MF	Seo Hyeok-joon	9 October 2006 (age 20)	(Korea Football Association) Ulsan University
	MF	Kim Ye-geon	7 August 2008 (age 18)	(Football Association of Serbia) Red Star Belgrade
	FW	Choi Byeong-wook	11 April 2005 (age 21)	(Korea Football Association) Jeju SK
	FW	Kim Do-yoon	18 May 2005 (age 21)	(Korea Football Association) Suwon FC
	FW	Kim Gyeol	14 January 2005 (age 21)	(Korea Football Association) Suwon Samsung Bluewings
	FW	Kim Jun-ha	2 December 2005 (age 20)	(Korea Football Association) Gimcheon Sangmu
	FW	Yoon Do-young	28 October 2006 (age 20)	(German Football Association) 1. FC Magdeburg

=== Recent call-ups ===
The following players have also been called up to a South Korea under-21 squad within the last 12 months.

Pos.	Player	Date of birth (age)	Caps	Goals	Club	Latest call-up
GK	Lee Sang-hyeon	19 July 2006 (age 20)			(South Korea) Bucheon FC 1995	v. Australia, 6 October 2026
GK	Hong Seong-min	29 September 2006 (age 20)			(South Korea) Pohang Steelers	v. Australia, 6 October 2026
GK	Lee Seung-hwan	5 April 2003 (age 23)			(South Korea) Chungbuk Cheongju	2026 Asian Games
GK	Kim Joon-hong	3 June 2003 (age 23)			(South Korea) Suwon Samsung Bluewings	2026 Asian Games
GK	Kim Hyung-jun	27 April 2005 (age 21)			(South Korea) Sungkyunkwan University	Cheonan training camp, August 2026
GK	Woo Kyu-jeong	16 May 2006 (age 20)			(South Korea) Chung-Ang University	Cheonan training camp, August 2026
GK	Lee Gyeong-jun	27 January 2006 (age 20)			(South Korea) Suwon Samsung Bluewings	Cheonan training camp, June 2026
GK	Han Tae-hee	5 July 2004 (age 22)			(South Korea) Daegu FC	v. United States, 31 March 2026
GK	Yun Ki-wook	10 October 2006 (age 20)			(South Korea) FC Seoul	Namhae training camp, March 2026
GK	Hwang Jae-yun	18 March 2003 (age 23)			(South Korea) Seoul E-Land	2026 AFC U-23 Asian Cup
GK	Moon Hyun-ho	13 May 2003 (age 23)			(South Korea) Ulsan HD	2026 AFC U-23 Asian Cup
DF	Choi Seok-hyun	13 January 2003 (age 23)			(South Korea) Ulsan HD	2026 Asian Games
DF	Park Seong-hoon	27 January 2003 (age 23)			(South Korea) FC Seoul	2026 Asian Games
DF	Kang Min-jun	8 April 2003 (age 23)			(South Korea) Pohang Steelers	2026 Asian Games
DF	Park Gyeong-seop	2 July 2004 (age 22)			(South Korea) Incheon United	2026 Asian Games
DF	Choi Woo-jin	18 July 2004 (age 22)			(South Korea) Jeonbuk Hyundai Motors	2026 Asian Games
DF	Kim Ji-soo	24 December 2004 (age 21)			(England) Brentford	2026 Asian Games
DF	Bae Hyun-seo	16 February 2005 (age 21)			(South Korea) Gyeongnam FC	2026 Asian Games
DF	Shin Min-ha	15 September 2005 (age 21)			(South Korea) Gangwon FC	2026 Asian Games
DF	Chung Ma-ho	14 January 2005 (age 21)			(South Korea) Gimcheon Sangmu	Cheonan training camp, August 2026
DF	Kang Chan-sol	14 May 2005 (age 21)			(South Korea) Korea University	Cheonan training camp, August 2026
DF	Um Joon-hyeok	28 December 2005 (age 20)			(South Korea) Dankook University	Cheonan training camp, August 2026
DF	Lee Ji-hun	19 January 2006 (age 20)			(South Korea) Kwangwoon University	Cheonan training camp, August 2026
DF	Lee Tak-ho	14 February 2006 (age 20)			(South Korea) Chung-Ang University	Cheonan training camp, August 2026
DF	Mun Ji-won	2 April 2006 (age 20)			(South Korea) Ulsan University	Cheonan training camp, August 2026
DF	Kim Seung-eon	20 September 2006 (age 20)			(South Korea) Hanyang University	Cheonan training camp, August 2026
DF	Jang Seok-hwan	11 October 2004 (age 22)			(South Korea) Gwangju FC	v. Kyrgyzstan, 9 June 2026
DF	Hwang Seok-ki	26 February 2005 (age 21)			(South Korea) Seongnam FC	Cheonan training camp, June 2026
DF	Kim Ho-jin	29 September 2005 (age 21)			(South Korea) Pohang Steelers	Cheonan training camp, June 2026
DF	Seo Jeong-hyeok	9 March 2006 (age 20)			(South Korea) Jeonbuk Hyundai Motors	Cheonan training camp, June 2026
DF	Lee Hyun-yong	29 December 2003 (age 22)			(South Korea) Suwon FC	v. United States, 31 March 2026
DF	Lee Ye-chan	23 May 2005 (age 21)			(South Korea) Bucheon FC 1995	Namhae training camp, March 2026
DF	Jang Ha-yun	30 June 2005 (age 21)			(South Korea) Paju Frontier	Namhae training camp, March 2026
DF	Jo In-jung	8 November 2005 (age 21)			(South Korea) Jeju SK	Namhae training camp, March 2026
DF	Park Jun-seo	26 April 2004 (age 22)			(South Korea) Hwaseong FC	2026 AFC U-23 Asian Cup
DF	Kim Do-hyun	12 May 2004 (age 22)			(South Korea) Gangwon FC	2026 AFC U-23 Asian Cup
DF	Jo Hyun-tae	27 October 2004 (age 22)			(South Korea) Daegu FC	2026 AFC U-23 Asian Cup
MF	Hwang Seo-woong	22 January 2005 (age 21)			(South Korea) Pohang Steelers	v. Australia, 6 October 2026
MF	Son Jeong-beom	28 September 2007 (age 19)			(South Korea) FC Seoul	v. Australia, 6 October 2026
MF	Lee Gi-hyuk ^{OA}	7 July 2000 (age 26)			(South Korea) Gangwon FC	2026 Asian Games
MF	Eom Ji-sung ^{OA}	9 May 2002 (age 24)			(Wales) Swansea City	2026 Asian Games
MF	Yang Hyun-jun ^{OA}	25 May 2002 (age 24)			(Scotland) Celtic	2026 Asian Games
MF	Lee Hyun-ju	7 February 2003 (age 23)			(Portugal) Arouca	2026 Asian Games
MF	Lee Seung-won	6 March 2003 (age 23)			(South Korea) Gangwon FC	2026 Asian Games
MF	Hwang Do-yun	9 April 2003 (age 23)			(South Korea) FC Seoul	2026 Asian Games
MF	Bae Jun-ho	21 August 2003 (age 23)			(England) Stoke City	2026 Asian Games
MF	Kang Sang-yoon	31 May 2004 (age 22)			(South Korea) Jeonbuk Hyundai Motors	2026 Asian Games
MF	Yang Min-hyeok	16 April 2006 (age 20)			(Belgium) Westerlo	2026 Asian Games
MF	Park Seung-soo	17 March 2007 (age 19)			(England) Newcastle United U21	2026 Asian Games
MF	Kang Seung-ho	7 April 2005 (age 21)			(South Korea) Honam University	Cheonan training camp, August 2026
MF	Jo Woo-ryeong	16 June 2005 (age 21)			(South Korea) Hannam University	Cheonan training camp, August 2026
MF	Kim Seung-hyun	21 January 2006 (age 20)			(South Korea) Ulsan University	Cheonan training camp, August 2026
MF	Kim Ju-hyun	8 February 2006 (age 20)			(South Korea) Dongguk University	Cheonan training camp, August 2026
MF	Jin Dong-hwan	28 April 2006 (age 20)			(South Korea) Yong In University	Cheonan training camp, August 2026
MF	Son Tae-hoon	30 June 2006 (age 20)			(South Korea) Tongmyong University	Cheonan training camp, August 2026
MF	Kang Seong-jin	26 March 2003 (age 23)			(South Korea) Suwon Samsung Bluewings	v. Kyrgyzstan, 9 June 2026
MF	Park Seung-ho	1 September 2003 (age 23)			(South Korea) Incheon United	v. Kyrgyzstan, 9 June 2026
MF	Seo Jae-min	16 September 2003 (age 23)			(South Korea) Incheon United	v. Kyrgyzstan, 9 June 2026
MF	Baek Ji-ung	29 August 2004 (age 22)			(South Korea) Seoul E-Land	v. Kyrgyzstan, 9 June 2026
MF	Sung Shin	13 January 2005 (age 21)			(South Korea) Bucheon FC 1995	Cheonan training camp, June 2026
MF	Baek Min-gyu	20 November 2005 (age 20)			(South Korea) Incheon United	Cheonan training camp, June 2026
MF	Jin Tae-ho	20 January 2006 (age 20)			(South Korea) Yongin FC	Cheonan training camp, June 2026
MF	Kim Hyun-min	30 July 2006 (age 20)			(South Korea) Busan IPark	Cheonan training camp, June 2026
MF	Baek In-woo	29 November 2006 (age 19)			(South Korea) Ulsan HD	Cheonan training camp, June 2026
MF	Cho Joon-hyun	4 February 2004 (age 22)			(South Korea) Seoul E-Land	v. United States, 31 March 2026
MF	Hwang Tae-hwan	23 July 2005 (age 21)			(South Korea) Sangji University	Namhae training camp, March 2026
MF	Baek Seung-won	15 February 2006 (age 20)			(South Korea) Pohang Steelers	Namhae training camp, March 2026
MF	Lee Chan-ouk	3 February 2003 (age 23)			(South Korea) Gyeongnam FC	2026 AFC U-23 Asian Cup
MF	Kim Han-seo	14 February 2003 (age 23)			(South Korea) Yongin FC	2026 AFC U-23 Asian Cup
MF	Kim Yong-hak	20 May 2003 (age 23)			(South Korea) Pohang Steelers	2026 AFC U-23 Asian Cup
MF	Kim Dong-jin	30 July 2003 (age 23)			(South Korea) Pohang Steelers	2026 AFC U-23 Asian Cup
MF	Park Hyun-bin	19 May 2003 (age 23)			(South Korea) Suwon Samsung Bluewings	Cheonan training camp, December 2025 ^{INJ}
FW	Ha Jeong-woo	8 November 2005 (age 21)			(South Korea) Suwon FC	v. Mexico, 14 November 2026 ^{INJ}
FW	Kim Min-su	19 January 2006 (age 20)			(Scotland) Rangers	v. Mexico, 14 November 2026 ^{INJ}
FW	Jeon Min-gyu	8 July 2006 (age 20)			(South Korea) Seongnam FC	v. Mexico, 14 November 2026 ^{INJ}
FW	Kim Tae-won	11 March 2005 (age 21)			(Japan) Kataller Toyama	v. Australia, 6 October 2026
FW	Lee Tae-kyung	19 January 2006 (age 20)			(South Korea) Chung-Ang University	v. Australia, 6 October 2026
FW	Lee Young-jun	23 May 2003 (age 23)			(Switzerland) Grasshopper	2026 Asian Games
FW	Kim Myung-jun	21 March 2006 (age 20)			(Belgium) Jong Genk	2026 Asian Games
FW	Bae Hyun-min	9 May 2005 (age 21)			(South Korea) Jungwon University	Cheonan training camp, August 2026
FW	Yu Ye-jong	8 September 2005 (age 21)			(South Korea) Howon University	Cheonan training camp, August 2026
FW	Kim Gi-wan	5 June 2006 (age 20)			(South Korea) Kyonggi University	Cheonan training camp, August 2026
FW	Na Hyeon-seo	27 December 2006 (age 19)			(South Korea) Calvin University	Cheonan training camp, August 2026
FW	Baek Ga-on	23 January 2006 (age 20)			(South Korea) Busan IPark	Cheonan training camp, June 2026
FW	Uh Dam	23 March 2006 (age 20)			(South Korea) Bucheon FC 1995	Namhae training camp, March 2026
FW	Jung Seung-bae	9 November 2003 (age 23)			(South Korea) Suwon FC	2026 AFC U-23 Asian Cup
FW	Jung Ji-hun	9 April 2004 (age 22)			(South Korea) Gwangju FC	2026 AFC U-23 Asian Cup
FW	Jeong Jae-sang	25 May 2004 (age 22)			(South Korea) Ulsan HD	2026 AFC U-23 Asian Cup
^{INJ} Withdrew due to injury.^{WD} Player withdrew from the squad due to non-injury issue.^{A} Call up to A team.^{OA} Overage player.

=== Overage players ===
Football at the Summer Olympics and the Asian Games have required that under-23 players enter the competitions, but they have allowed three overage players can be included in one squad. These three players are called the "Wild cards" in South Korea. According to South Korean laws, Olympic medalists and Asian Games gold medalists can be exempted from the military service, and so top-level players also compete for wild cards.

Olympics	Player 1	Player 2	Player 3
1996	Lee Lim-saeng (DF) (Note: Lee Lim-saeng was replaced by reserve player Lee Kyung-chun after the second match due to his injury.); Lee Kyung-chun (DF)	Ha Seok-ju (MF)	Hwang Sun-hong (FW)
2000	Kang Chul (DF)	Kim Sang-sik (DF)	Kim Do-hoon (FW)
2004	Yoo Sang-chul (MF)	Chung Kyung-ho (FW)	—
2008	Kim Dong-jin (DF)	Kim Jung-woo (MF)	—
2012	Jung Sung-ryong (GK)	Kim Chang-soo (DF)	Park Chu-young (FW)
2016	Jang Hyun-soo (DF)	Son Heung-min (FW)	Suk Hyun-jun (FW)
2020	Park Ji-soo (DF)	Kwon Chang-hoon (MF)	Hwang Ui-jo (FW)
Asian Games	Player 1	Player 2	Player 3
2002	Lee Woon-jae (GK)	Kim Young-chul (DF)	Lee Young-pyo (DF)
2006	Kim Dong-jin (DF)	Kim Do-heon (MF)	Lee Chun-soo (FW)
2010	Kim Jung-woo (MF)	Park Chu-young (FW)	—
2014	Kim Seung-gyu (GK)	Park Joo-ho (DF)	Kim Shin-wook (FW)
2018	Jo Hyeon-woo (GK)	Hwang Ui-jo (FW)	Son Heung-min (FW)
2022	Park Jin-seob (DF)	Seol Young-woo (DF)	Paik Seung-ho (MF)
2026	Eom Ji-sung (MF)	Lee Gi-hyuk (MF)	Yang Hyun-jun (MF)

== Records ==
Statistics below are from matches which the KFA consider as official including non-international matches (against clubs, regional teams, and other KFA teams).

=== Most appearances ===
As of 20 July 2026

Rank	Player	Caps	Goals	Career	Ref.
1	Kim Do-heon	39	3	2002–2006	
2	Kim Dong-jin	37	6	2002–2008	
3	Lee Ki-hyung	36	7	1994–1996	
3	Kim Jung-woo	36	2	2003–2010	
5	Choi Tae-uk	34	8	2000–2004	
5	Choi Sung-kuk	34	1	2002–2006	
7	Choi Sung-yong	33	0	1994–1996	
8	Choi Yong-soo	31	18	1994–1996	
8	Moon Chang-jin	31	16	2013–2016	
8	Cho Young-wook	31	14	2017–2023	

=== Top goalscorers ===
As of 20 July 2026

Rank	Player	Goals	Caps	Ratio	Career	Ref.
1	Hwang Ui-jo	18	28	0.64	2012–2021	
1	Choi Yong-soo	18	31	0.58	1994–1996	
3	Lee Dong-gook	16	25	0.64	1999–2002	
3	Moon Chang-jin	16	31	0.52	2013–2016	
5	Cho Young-wook	14	31	0.45	2017–2023	
6	Lee Dong-gyeong	12	18	0.67	2018–2021	
6	Park Chu-young	12	30	0.4	2006–2012	
8	Jeong Woo-yeong	11	20	0.55	2019–2023	
8	Kwon Chang-hoon	11	25	0.44	2015–2021	
8	Lee Chun-soo	11	28	0.39	1999–2006	

== Competitive record ==
Champions Runners-up Third place Tournament played on home soil

=== Summer Olympics ===
Football at the Summer Olympics was a senior tournament until 1988.

Summer Olympics record									Qualification record					
Year	Round	Pld	W	D	L	GF	GA	Squad	Pld	W	D	L	GF	GA
1948–1988	Entered with the senior team								Entered with the senior team					
(Spain) 1992	Group stage	3	0	3	0	2	2	Squad	13	10	2	1	36	4
(United States) 1996	Group stage	3	1	1	1	2	2	Squad	9	8	1	0	25	5
(Australia) 2000	Group stage	3	2	0	1	2	3	Squad	7	6	1	0	24	2
(Greece) 2004	Quarter-finals	4	1	2	1	8	8	Squad	8	8	0	0	12	0
(China) 2008	Group stage	3	1	1	1	2	4	Squad	12	8	3	1	14	4
(United Kingdom) 2012	Bronze medalists	6	2	3	1	5	5	Squad	8	4	4	0	12	4
(Brazil) 2016	Quarter-finals	4	2	1	1	12	4	Squad	Via AFC U-23 Asian Cup					
(Japan) 2020	Quarter-finals	4	2	0	2	13	7	Squad	Via AFC U-23 Asian Cup					
(France) 2024	Did not qualify								Via AFC U-23 Asian Cup					
Total	Bronze medalists	30	11	11	8	46	35	8/9	57	44	11	2	123	19

=== AFC U-23 Asian Cup ===
AFC U-23 Asian Cup record									Qualification record					
Year	Round	Pld	W	D	L	GF	GA	Squad	Pld	W	D	L	GF	GA
(Oman) 2013	Fourth place	6	3	2	1	8	3	Squad	5	4	1	0	23	3
(Qatar) 2016	Runners-up	6	4	1	1	14	6	Squad	3	3	0	0	12	0
(China) 2018	Fourth place	6	3	1	2	8	9	Squad	3	2	1	0	12	1
(Thailand) 2020	Champions	6	6	0	0	10	3	Squad	3	2	1	0	16	3
(Uzbekistan) 2022	Quarter-finals	4	2	1	1	6	5	Squad	3	3	0	0	14	1
(Qatar) 2024	Quarter-finals	4	3	1	0	6	2	Squad	2	2	0	0	4	0
(Saudi Arabia) 2026	Fourth place	6	2	2	2	8	8	Squad	3	3	0	0	13	0
(Japan) 2028	To be determined								To be determined					
Total	1 title	38	23	8	7	60	36	7/7	22	19	3	0	94	8

=== Asian Games ===
Football at the Asian Games was a senior tournament until 1998.

Asian Games record
Year	Round	Pld	W	D	L	GF	GA	Squad
1951–1998	Entered with the senior team							
(South Korea) 2002	Bronze medalists	6	5	1	0	17	2	Squad
(Qatar) 2006	Fourth place	6	4	0	2	9	2	Squad
(China) 2010	Bronze medalists	7	5	0	2	17	6	Squad
(South Korea) 2014	Gold medalists	7	7	0	0	13	0	Squad
(Indonesia) 2018	Gold medalists	7	6	0	1	19	7	Squad
(China) 2022	Gold medalists	7	7	0	0	27	3	Squad
(Japan) 2026	Gold medalists	5	5	0	0	13	2	Squad
(Qatar) 2030	To be determined							
(Saudi Arabia) 2034	To be determined							
Total	4 titles	45	39	1	5	115	22	7/7

=== Other competitions ===
Competition	Round	Pld	W	D	L	GF	GA	Squad
(Saudi Arabia) 2024 WAFF U-23 Championship	Champions	3	2	1	0	4	2	Squad

== Head-to-head record ==
The following table shows South Korea under-23s' head-to-head record against each foreign national team, as of 15 September 2026.

Opponent	Pld	W	D	L	GF	GA	GD	Win %
Algeria	2	2	0	0	5	0	+5	100.00
Argentina	1	0	1	0	2	2	+0	0.00
Australia	19	12	4	3	30	16	+14	63.16
Austria	1	1	0	0	3	1	+2	100.00
Bahrain	10	9	1	0	19	1	+18	90.00
Bangladesh	3	3	0	0	10	0	+10	100.00
Brazil	4	0	0	4	1	11	−10	0.00
Brunei	1	1	0	0	5	0	+5	100.00
Bulgaria	1	1	0	0	5	1	+4	100.00
Cambodia	2	2	0	0	7	1	+6	100.00
Cameroon	1	0	1	0	1	1	+0	0.00
Canada	4	2	2	0	8	4	+4	50.00
Chile	1	1	0	0	1	0	+1	100.00
China	21	14	3	4	30	12	+18	66.67
Chinese Taipei	3	3	0	0	23	1	+22	100.00
Colombia	3	0	2	1	4	5	−1	0.00
Colombia U20	1	1	0	0	1	0	+1	100.00
Costa Rica	1	1	0	0	4	1	+3	100.00
Czech Republic	1	1	0	0	4	1	+3	100.00
Denmark	4	0	2	2	3	6	−3	0.00
Denmark XI	1	0	1	0	0	0	+0	0.00
Timor-Leste	3	2	1	0	9	0	+9	66.67
Egypt	2	1	1	0	2	0	+2	50.00
England	1	0	1	0	1	1	+0	0.00
Estonia	1	1	0	0	5	1	+4	100.00
Fiji	1	1	0	0	8	0	+8	100.00
France	5	1	1	3	5	5	+0	20.00
Gabon	1	0	1	0	0	0	+0	0.00
Germany	1	0	1	0	3	3	+0	0.00
Ghana	5	4	1	0	9	2	+7	80.00
Great Britain	1	0	1	0	1	1	+0	0.00
Greece	1	0	1	0	2	2	+0	0.00
Guatemala	1	1	0	0	2	1	+1	100.00
Honduras	5	3	1	1	11	3	+8	60.00
Honduras U20	1	1	0	0	2	0	+2	100.00
Hong Kong	5	5	0	0	18	0	+18	100.00
Indonesia	9	8	1	0	27	5	+22	88.89
Indonesia U20	1	1	0	0	2	1	+1	100.00
Iran	10	6	2	2	14	8	+6	60.00
Iraq	7	3	2	2	8	7	+1	42.86
Iraq A	1	0	1	0	2	2	+0	0.00
Italy	2	0	0	2	1	5	−4	0.00
Ivory Coast	1	1	0	0	2	1	+1	100.00
Ivory Coast U20	1	0	0	1	1	2	−1	0.00
Japan	20	10	4	6	22	22	+0	50.00
Japan U20	1	0	0	1	1	2	−1	0.00
Japan Universiade	1	1	0	0	3	0	+3	100.00
Jordan	7	4	3	0	12	4	+8	57.14
Kazakhstan	1	1	0	0	2	1	+1	100.00
Kuwait	3	2	1	0	12	2	+10	66.67
Kuwait A	1	1	0	0	2	1	+1	100.00
Kyrgyzstan	4	3	0	1	7	2	+5	75.00
Laos	2	2	0	0	9	0	+9	100.00
Lebanon	1	1	0	0	4	2	+2	100.00
Lesotho	1	1	0	0	2	0	+2	100.00
Macau	2	2	0	0	15	0	+15	100.00
Malaysia	11	8	1	2	23	7	+16	72.73
Malaysia A	2	1	0	1	4	2	+2	50.00
Maldives	1	1	0	0	4	0	+4	100.00
Mali	1	0	1	0	3	3	+0	0.00
Mexico	10	3	5	2	9	10	−1	30.00
Morocco	6	1	2	3	3	7	−4	16.67
Myanmar	3	2	1	0	6	0	+6	66.67
Namibia	1	1	0	0	2	0	+2	100.00
Netherlands	1	1	0	0	1	0	+1	100.00
New Zealand	4	3	0	1	9	5	+4	75.00
Nigeria	4	4	0	0	14	2	+12	100.00
North Korea	4	2	1	1	4	1	+3	50.00
Norway	1	0	1	0	0	0	+0	0.00
Norway A	1	1	0	0	3	0	+3	100.00
Oman	6	6	0	0	18	3	+15	100.00
Palestine	1	1	0	0	3	0	+3	100.00
Paraguay	2	0	1	1	2	3	−1	0.00
Paraguay XI	2	1	1	0	6	1	+5	50.00
Philippines	4	4	0	0	30	0	+30	100.00
Qatar	9	2	4	3	8	7	+1	22.22
Qatar U20	1	0	1	0	1	1	+0	0.00
Romania	1	1	0	0	4	0	+4	100.00
Russia	4	2	1	1	6	3	+3	50.00
Saudi Arabia	15	8	3	4	15	12	+3	53.33
Scotland	1	0	0	1	0	1	−1	0.00
Senegal	1	1	0	0	3	0	+3	100.00
Singapore	1	1	0	0	5	1	+4	100.00
South Africa	1	0	0	1	1	2	−1	0.00
Spain	2	0	0	2	2	6	−4	0.00
Sri Lanka	1	1	0	0	5	0	+5	100.00
Sweden	3	1	1	1	4	6	−2	33.33
Switzerland	3	3	0	0	6	2	+4	100.00
Syria	5	3	2	0	6	2	+4	60.00
Thailand	8	8	0	0	18	3	+15	100.00
Thailand A	2	1	1	0	3	1	+2	50.00
Trinidad and Tobago	2	1	1	0	2	0	+2	50.00
Tunisia	2	2	0	0	7	1	+6	100.00
United Arab Emirates	12	8	2	2	20	7	+13	66.67
United States	6	3	1	2	8	9	−1	50.00
Uzbekistan	18	13	2	3	35	20	+15	72.22
Vietnam	10	6	4	0	16	7	+9	60.00
Yemen	3	2	0	1	6	1	+5	66.67
Total	371	228	78	65	717	286	+431	61.46

== Honours ==
=== Intercontinental ===
- Summer Olympics

Bronze medalists: 2012

=== Continental ===
- AFC U-23 Asian Cup

Champions: 2020
Runners-up: 2016

- Asian Games

Gold medalists: 2014, 2018, 2022, 2026
Bronze medalists: 2002, 2010

=== Regional ===
- WAFF U-23 Championship

Champions: 2024

=== Friendly competitions ===
- Dunhill Cup Vietnam: 1999
- Four Nations Tournament: 2000 (Australia), 2003 (South Africa)
- Qatar International Friendship Tournament: 2005, 2023
- King's Cup: 2012, 2015
- Panda Cup: 2025

=== Awards ===
- AFC National Team of the Year: 2012
- AFC U-23 Asian Cup Fair Play Award: 2013, 2026

== See also ==
- Football in South Korea
- Korea Football Association
- South Korea national football team
- South Korea national football B team
- South Korea national under-20 football team
- South Korea national under-17 football team
- South Korea women's national football team
