= South Korea national under-23 football team results (1991–1999) =

Results of the South Korean under-23 football team from 1991–1999

- Win Draw Loss

This article is the list of international matches of the South Korea national under-23 football team from 1991 to 1999.

== Results by year ==
Year	Pld	W	D	L	Win %
1991	14	13	1	0	92.86
1992	16	8	5	3	50.00
1993	Did not play				
1994	4	3	1	0	75.00
1995	25	11	7	7	44.00
1996	14	5	6	3	35.71
1997	Did not play				
1998	Did not play				
1999	20	16	2	2	80.00
Total	93	56	22	15	60.22

== Under-23 matches ==
=== 1991 ===
24 March Friendly	South Korea	5–0	Indonesia	Masan, South Korea
15:00 KST (UTC+09)	Shin Tae-yong 5', 52'; Na Seung-hwa 9'; No Jung-yoon 51'; Kwak Kyung-keun 57'			Stadium: Masan Stadium; Attendance: 15,000; Referee: Kim Gwang-taek (South Korea)

26 March Friendly	South Korea	3–1	Indonesia	Busan, South Korea
15:00 KST (UTC+09)	Kwon Tae-kyu 17', 28'; Kwak Kyung-keun 77'		Maizar 57'	Stadium: Busan Gudeok Stadium; Attendance: 3,000; Referee: Han Nam-sik (South Korea)

5 April Friendly	South Korea	2–1	United States	Busan, South Korea
16:00 KST (UTC+09)	Lim Keun-jae 30', 69'		Vermes 57'	Stadium: Busan Gudeok Stadium; Referee: Kil Ki-chul (South Korea)

7 April Friendly	South Korea	2–0	United States	Pohang, South Korea
16:00 KST (UTC+09)	Noh Jung-yoon 44'; Agoos 60' (o.g.)			Stadium: Pohang Football Stadium; Attendance: 4,000; Referee: Kim In-soo (South Korea)

12 April Friendly	South Korea	3–0	Canada	Suwon, South Korea
18:00 KST (UTC+09)	Lim Keun-jae 3'; Kim In-wan 49'; Seo Jung-won 82'			Stadium: Suwon Civic Stadium; Attendance: 3,000; Referee: Park Hee-charang (South Korea)

14 April Friendly	South Korea	1–0	Canada	Gongju, South Korea
14:00 KST (UTC+09)	Kim Yong-bum 78'			Stadium: Gongju City Stadium; Attendance: 20,000; Referee: Cho Chang-seon (South Korea)

18 May 1992 Summer Olympics (Qualification)	South Korea	10–0	Philippines	Seoul, South Korea
18:00 KST (UTC+09)	Seo Jung-won 14', 21', 52'; Kim Gwi-hwa 26', 89'; Na Seung-hwa 34'; Kim In-wan 43'; No Jung-yoon 62'; Shin Tae-yong 70'; Kwon Tae-kyu 74'			Stadium: Olympic Stadium; Attendance: 4,000; Referee: Dzulkifli Chanigo (Indonesia)

20 May 1992 Summer Olympics (Qualification)	South Korea	6–0	Bangladesh	Seoul, South Korea
19:00 KST (UTC+09)	Lee Ki-bum 4'; Na Seung-hwa 27'; Kwak Kyung-keun 59'; No Jung-yoon 69'; Kwon Tae-kyu 81'; Han Jung-kook 89'			Stadium: Olympic Stadium; Attendance: 3,500; Referee: Samuel Chan Yam Ming (Hong Kong)

22 May 1992 Summer Olympics (Qualification)	South Korea	2–1	Thailand	Seoul, South Korea
19:00 KST (UTC+09)	Seo Jung-won 50'; Han Jung-gook 81'		Khunkarekroad 65'	Stadium: Olympic Stadium; Attendance: 5,000; Referee: Ahmed Ibrahim Hakeem (United Arab Emirates)

26 May 1992 Summer Olympics (Qualification)	South Korea	0–0	Malaysia	Seoul, South Korea
17:00 KST (UTC+09)				Stadium: Olympic Stadium; Attendance: 30,000; Referee: Mohammad Riyahi (Iran)

29 June 1992 Summer Olympics (Qualification)	Philippines	0–7	South Korea	Kuala Lumpur, Malaysia
20:30 MST (UTC+08)			Kim Kwi-hwa 2', 11'; Kim Ki-nam 47'; Kwon Tae-kyu 50'; Han Jung-gook 57'; Lee Moon-seok 72'; Seo Jung-won 83'	Stadium: Merdeka Stadium; Referee: Sagar Kumar Sen (India)

1 July 1992 Summer Olympics (Qualification)	Malaysia	0–2	South Korea	Kuala Lumpur, Malaysia
18:40 MST (UTC+08)			Kim Ki-nam 16'; Seo Jung-won 19'	Stadium: Merdeka Stadium; Referee: Shizuo Takada (Japan)

3 July 1992 Summer Olympics (Qualification)	Bangladesh	0–1	South Korea	Kuala Lumpur, Malaysia
15:45 MST (UTC+08)			No Jung-yoon 27'	Stadium: Merdeka Stadium; Referee: Odeh Al-Rahal (Jordan)

5 July 1992 Summer Olympics (Qualification)	Thailand	0–2	South Korea	Kuala Lumpur, Malaysia
20:30 MST (UTC+08)			Choi Moon-sik 69', 73'	Stadium: Merdeka Stadium; Referee: Mohammed Al-Swayel (Saudi Arabia)

=== 1992 ===
18 January 1992 Summer Olympics (Qualification)	South Korea	1–1	Kuwait	Kuala Lumpur, Malaysia
21:30 MST (UTC+08)	No Jung-yoon 30'		Al-Hadiyah 10'	Stadium: Merdeka Stadium; Attendance: 10,000; Referee: Kamaruddin Haji Sakhari (Malaysia)

21 January 1992 Summer Olympics (Qualification)	South Korea	1–0	Bahrain	Kuala Lumpur, Malaysia
19:30 MST (UTC+08)	No Jung-yoon 43'			Stadium: Merdeka Stadium; Referee: Samuel Chan Yam Ming (Hong Kong)

24 January 1992 Summer Olympics (Qualification)	Qatar	1–0	South Korea	Kuala Lumpur, Malaysia
20:00 MST (UTC+08)	Noorallah 38'			Stadium: Merdeka Stadium; Attendance: 40,000; Referee: Ali Bujsaim (United Arab Emirates)

27 January 1992 Summer Olympics (Qualification)	South Korea	1–0	Japan	Kuala Lumpur, Malaysia
19:30 MST (UTC+08)	Kim Byung-soo 88'			Stadium: Merdeka Stadium; Referee: Jamal Al Sharif (Syria)

30 January 1992 Summer Olympics (Qualification)	South Korea	3–1	China	Kuala Lumpur, Malaysia
20:30 MST (UTC+08)	Kwak Kyung-keun 2'; Seo Jung-won 5'; Kim Kwi-hwa 9'		Hao Haidong 79'	Stadium: Merdeka Stadium; Referee: Jamal Al Sharif (Syria)

17 March Friendly	United States	3–1	South Korea	Los Angeles, United States
19:00 PDT (UTC−07)	Snow 6'; Jones 10'; Washington 11'		Jung Jae-kwon 57'	Stadium: Los Angeles Memorial Coliseum; Attendance: 15,000; Referee: Arturo Angeles (United States)

19 March Friendly	South Korea	2–0	Honduras	Los Angeles, United States
19:00 PDT (UTC−07)	Kim Do-hoon 10', 43'			Stadium: Los Angeles Memorial Coliseum; Attendance: 12,000; Referee: Arturo Angeles (United States)

21 March Friendly	United States	1–2	South Korea	Irvine, United States
15:00 PDT (UTC−07)	Snow 47'		Kwak Kyung-keun 30'; Kim Dong-hak 54'	Stadium: UC Irvine Stadium; Referee: Benito Archundia (Mexico)

31 March Friendly	Canada	2–2	South Korea	Burnaby, Canada
	Macey 62'; Corazzin 81'		Kim Kwi-hwa 36'; Kwak Kyung-keun 50'	Stadium: Swangard Stadium

3 May Friendly	South Korea	2–1	Australia	Iri, South Korea
15:00 KST (UTC+09)	Shin Tae-yong 21' (pen.); No Jung-yoon 52'		Seal 50'	Stadium: Iri Civic Stadium; Attendance: 18,012; Referee: Lee Sang-yong (South Korea)

5 May Friendly	South Korea	2–1	Australia	Pyeongtaek, South Korea
15:00 KST (UTC+09)	Seo Jung-won 84'; Jung Jae-kwon 87'		Gibson 28'	Stadium: Pyeongtaek Civic Stadium

19 May Friendly	Austria	1–3	South Korea	Salzburg, Austria
17:15 CEST (UTC+02)	Reinmayr 5'		Shin Tae-yong 13'; Cho Jung-hyun 16'; Seo Jung-won 78'	Stadium: Lehen Stadium; Attendance: 12,000

27 May Friendly	Spain	3–2	South Korea	Valencia, Spain
	Mikel Lasa 19'; Gabriel Vidal 63'; Alfonso Pérez 89'		Seo Jung-won 25'; Na Seung-hwa 80'	Stadium: Estadio Luís Casanova

26 July 1992 Summer Olympics (Group C)	Morocco	1–1	South Korea	Valencia, Spain
21:00 CEST (UTC+02)	Bahja 64'		Jung Jae-kwon 73'	Stadium: Estadio Luís Casanova; Attendance: 2,000; Referee: Arturo Angeles (United States)

28 July 1992 Summer Olympics (Group C)	Paraguay	0–0	South Korea	Valencia, Spain
21:00 CEST (UTC+02)		Report		Stadium: Estadio Luís Casanova; Attendance: 2,000; Referee: Mohamed Sendid (Algeria)

30 July 1992 Summer Olympics (Group C)	Sweden	1–1	South Korea	Barcelona, Spain
21:00 CEST (UTC+02)	Rödlund 52'	Report	Seo Jung-won 28'	Stadium: Estadi de Sarrià; Attendance: 12,000; Referee: Manuel Díaz Vega (Spain)

=== 1994 ===
27 November Friendly	South Korea	3–0	Russia	Changwon, South Korea
15:00 KST (UTC+09)	Lee Woo-young 31', 89'; Park Choong-Kyun 84'			Stadium: Changwon Civic Stadium; Attendance: 13,750; Referee: Kang Byung-Ho (South Korea)

29 November Friendly	South Korea	1–1	Russia	Changwon, South Korea
15:00 KST (UTC+09)	Cho Hyun 13'		Kharlachyov 30' (pen.)	Stadium: Changwon Civic Stadium; Attendance: 10,264; Referee: Han Nam-Sik (South Korea)

21 December Friendly	Saudi Arabia	0–1	South Korea	Riyadh, Saudi Arabia
			Park Choong-kyun 60'	Stadium: King Fahd International Stadium

24 December Friendly	Saudi Arabia	0–3	South Korea	Jeddah, Saudi Arabia
15:00 KST (UTC+09)			Lee Woo-young 11', 33'; Yoon Jung-hwan 22'	Stadium: Prince Abdullah al-Faisal Stadium

=== 1995 ===
14 January Coca-Cola Cup	South Korea	1–0	Japan	Sydney, Australia
16:30 AEST (UTC+10)	Choi Yong-soo 18'			Stadium: Aussie Stadium; Referee: Gerry Connolly (Australia)

16 January Coca-Cola Cup	Australia	1–1	South Korea	Canberra, Australia
19:30 AEST (UTC+10)	Spiteri 70'		Park Choong-kyun 64'	Stadium: Bruce Stadium; Attendance: 12,000

18 January Coca-Cola Cup	Denmark	0–0	South Korea	Wollongong, Australia
17:30 AEST (UTC+10)				Stadium: Brandon Park; Attendance: 10,000; Referee: John Fraser (Australia)

21 January Coca-Cola Cup	Denmark	2–1	South Korea	Sydney, Australia
18:30 AEST (UTC+10)	Nielsen 20'; Sørensen 83'		Woo Sung-yong 49'	Stadium: Aussie Stadium; Referee: Eugene Brazzale (Australia)

8 March Friendly	Switzerland	1–2	South Korea	Lugano, Switzerland
	La Placa 20'		Cho Jong-hwa 64'; Lee Ki-hyung 75'	Stadium: Lugano Stadium

22 March Friendly	Tunisia	1–5	South Korea	Tunis, Tunisia
15:00	? 72'		Lee Woo-young 21'; Lee Kyung-soo 25'; Woo Sung-yong 44'; Cho Hyun 56'; Oh Gwang-hoon 68'	Stadium: Stade Olympique El-Menzah

14 May Friendly	South Korea	0–0	Ghana	Seoul, South Korea
14:00				Stadium: Seoul Olympic Stadium; Attendance: 38,755; Referee: An Bong-ki (South Korea)

16 May Friendly	South Korea	3–0	Ghana	Suwon, South Korea
19:30	Cho Hyun-doo 9'; Yoon Jung-hwan 66'; Kim Dae-ui 90'			Stadium: Suwon Sports Complex; Attendance: 32,150; Referee: Han Nam-sik (South Korea)

21 May 1996 Summer Olympics (Qualification)	Hong Kong	0–5	South Korea	Hong Kong
15:30 HKT (UTC+08)			Woo Sung-yong 7'; Choi Yong-soo 16', 44' (pen.); Lee Ki-hyung 48'; Yoon Jong-hwan 68'	Stadium: Mong Kok Stadium; Attendance: 3,000

25 May 1996 Summer Olympics (Qualification)	Indonesia	1–2	South Korea	Jakarta, Indonesia
19:00 IWST (UTC+07)	Indriyanto 65'		Choi Yong-soo 42', 50'	Stadium: Gelora Bung Karno Stadium; Attendance: 70,000

5 June 1995 Toulon Tournament	France	1–0	South Korea	Berre, France
17:00	Histilloles 69'			Stadium: Berre Municipal Stadium; Attendance: 1,000; Referee: Dermot Gallagher (England)

7 June 1995 Toulon Tournament	Mexico	1–0	South Korea	Arles, France
18:00	Martinez 23'			Stadium: Fernand Fournier Stadium; Referee: Nik Ahmad Yaakub (Malaysia)

9 June 1995 Toulon Tournament	Scotland	1–0	South Korea	Six-Fours-les-Plages, France
18:00	Dailly 81'			Stadium: Presqu'ile du Gaou; Referee: M. Fernandes (Angola)

19 August 1996 Summer Olympics (Qualification)	South Korea	7–0	Hong Kong	Gwangju, South Korea
14:00 KST (UTC+09)	Park Choong-kyun 7'; Cho Hyun-doo 30'; Choi Yong-soo 34', 61', 69', 78'; Lee Woo-young 82'			Stadium: Gwangju Mudeung Stadium; Attendance: 7,238; Referee: Shinichiro Obata (Japan)

22 August 1996 Summer Olympics (Qualification)	South Korea	1–0	Indonesia	Seoul, South Korea
17:00 KST (UTC+09)	Cho Hyun-doo 41'			Stadium: Seoul Olympic Stadium; Attendance: 21,438; Referee: Chin Fan Chuang (Chinese Taipei)

6 October Friendly	South Korea	2–1	Mexico	Suwon, South Korea
18:00	Lee Ki-hyung 35'; Choi Yong-soo 64'		Capetillo 29'	Stadium: Suwon Sports Complex; Attendance: 9,231; Referee: Han Nam-sik (South Korea)

8 October Friendly	South Korea	1–1	Mexico	Changwon, South Korea
15:00	Cho Hyun-doo 24'		Palencia 80'	Stadium: Changwon Stadium; Attendance: 27,153; Referee: Lee Sang-kwon (South Korea)

13 October Friendly	South Korea	0–0	Trinidad and Tobago	Ulsan, South Korea
18:30				Stadium: Ulsan Public Stadium; Attendance: 12,483; Referee: Kim Young-joo (South Korea)

15 October Friendly	South Korea	2–0	Trinidad and Tobago	Pohang, South Korea
15:00	Lee Ki-hyung 42'; Kim Dae-ui 54'			Stadium: Pohang Sports Complex; Attendance: 3,125; Referee: An Bong-ki (South Korea)

4 November Friendly	Norway	0–0	South Korea	Porsgrunn, Norway
13:30				Stadium: Pors Stadium; Attendance: 350; Referee: Tore Hollung (Norway)

7 November Friendly	Sweden	3–0	South Korea	Kalmar, Sweden
19:00	Ljung 42'; Olsson 71'; Blomqvist 83'			Stadium: Frederikskans Stadium; Attendance: 1,460; Referee: Jorn West Larsen (Denmark)

23 November Friendly	South Korea	0–1	Russia	Suwon, South Korea
18:30			Semak 29'	Stadium: Suwon Sports Complex; Attendance: 9,021; Referee: Lee Sang-kwon (South Korea)

25 November Friendly	South Korea	2–1	Russia	Suwon, South Korea
14:00	Lee Sang-hun 28'; Choi Yong-soo 70' (pen.)		Oreshchuk 32'	Stadium: Suwon Sports Complex; Attendance: 12,361; Referee: Kim Young-joo (South Korea)

=== 1996 ===
9 February Kam Tournament	South Korea	1–3	Denmark	Monterey Park, United States
19:00 PST (UTC−08)	Choi Yong-soo 82'		Jørgensen 30' (pen.); Lyhne 45'; Jensen 61'	Stadium: Weingart Stadium; Referee: Arturo Angeles (United States)

11 February Kam Tournament	United States	0–0	South Korea	Monterey Park, United States
20:30 PST (UTC−08)				Stadium: Weingart Stadium

14 February Kam Tournament	South Korea	1–1	Mexico	Santa Ana, United States
21:00 PST (UTC−08)	Choi Yong-soo 89'		Pérez 90'	Stadium: Santa Ana Bowl; Referee: Arturo Angeles (United States)

18 February Kam Tournament	South Korea	2–2	Canada	San Jose, United States
20:00 PST (UTC−08)	Choi Yong-soo 58', 77'		Thompson 1' (pen.), 16'	Stadium: PAL Stadium

17 March 1996 Summer Olympics (Qualification)	South Korea	1–1	Saudi Arabia	Shah Alam, Malaysia
22:00 MST (UTC+08)	Yoon Jung-hwan 21'		O. Al-Dosari 39'	Stadium: Shah Alam Stadium; Attendance: 22,000; Referee: Sidi Bekaye Magassa (Mali)

19 March 1996 Summer Olympics (Qualification)	South Korea	2–1	Kazakhstan	Shah Alam, Malaysia
20:00 MST (UTC+08)	Lee Ki-hyung 59'; Woo Sung-yong 88'		Grokhovsky 2'	Stadium: Shah Alam Stadium; Attendance: 5,000; Referee: Jamal Al Sharif (Syria)

21 March 1996 Summer Olympics (Qualification)	South Korea	3–0	China	Kuala Lumpur, Malaysia
21:00 MST (UTC+08)	Lee Ki-hyung 35'; Lee Woo-young 58', 67'			Stadium: Merdeka Stadium; Attendance: 20,000; Referee: Said Belqola (Morocco)

24 March 1996 Summer Olympics (Qualification)	South Korea	2–1	Iraq	Shah Alam, Malaysia
22:15 MST (UTC+08)	Choi Yong-soo 19', 30'		Hamad 89'	Stadium: Shah Alam Stadium; Attendance: 30,000; Referee: Pirom Un-Prasert (Thailand)

27 March 1996 Summer Olympics (Qualification)	South Korea	2–1	Japan	Shah Alam, Malaysia
22:15 MST (UTC+08)	Lee Sang-heon 79'; Choi Yong-Soo 82' (pen.)		Jo 80'	Stadium: Shah Alam Stadium; Attendance: 50,000; Referee: Jamal Al Sharif (Syria)

6 July Friendly	South Korea	1–2	Colombia	Changwon, South Korea
17:00 KST (UTC+09)	Lee Won-sik 86'		Gallo 38', 63'	Stadium: Changwon Civic Stadium; Attendance: 8,120; Referee: Kim Gwang-taek (South Korea)

9 July Friendly	South Korea	1–1	Colombia	Daejeon, South Korea
19:00 KST (UTC+09)	Ha Seok-ju 27'		Gallo 29'	Stadium: Daejeon Hanbat Stadium; Attendance: 30,125; Referee: An Bong-ki (South Korea)

21 July 1996 Summer Olympics (Group C)	South Korea	1–0	Ghana	Washington D.C., United States
12:00 EDT (UTC−04)	Yoon Jung-hwan 41' (pen.)	Report		Stadium: RFK Stadium; Attendance: 45,946; Referee: Edward Lennie (United States)

23 July 1996 Summer Olympics (Group C)	Mexico	0–0	South Korea	Birmingham, United States
20:00 CDT (UTC−05)		Report		Stadium: Legion Field; Attendance: 26,111; Referee: Lucien Bouchardeau (Niger)

25 July 1996 Summer Olympics (Group C)	Italy	2–1	South Korea	Birmingham, United States
21:00 CDT (UTC−05)	Branca 24', 82'	Report	Lee Ki-hyung 62'	Stadium: Legion Field; Attendance: 28,319; Referee: Robert Ruben Ruscio (Argentina)

=== 1999 ===
15 January Friendly	Australia	0–1	South Korea	Morwell, Australia
19:30 AEST (UTC+10)			Lee Kwan-woo 17'	Stadium: Mobil Park; Referee: John Connolly (Australia)

22 January Friendly	Australia	0–2	South Korea	Melbourne, Australia
19:30 AEST (UTC+10)			Seol Ki-hyeon 25'; Sinozic 89' (o.g.)	Stadium: Lakeside Stadium; Attendance: 4,000; Referee: Mark Shield (Australia)

30 January Dunhill Cup Vietnam	South Korea	2–1	China	Ho Chi Minh, Vietnam
19:45 ICT (UTC+07)	Lee Dong-gook 24', 52'		Zhang Yuning 63'	Stadium: Thong Nhat Stadium; Attendance: 5,000; Referee: Jerry Andres (Philippines)

3 February Dunhill Cup Vietnam	South Korea	5–1	Bulgaria	Ho Chi Minh, Vietnam
17:00 ICT (UTC+07)	Kim Dong-seon 1', 70'; Shin Byung-ho 52', 79'; Lee Kwan-woo 61' (pen.)		Chomakov 8' (pen.)	Stadium: Thong Nhat Stadium; Attendance: 400; Referee: Luong The Tai (Vietnam)

5 February Dunhill Cup Vietnam	South Korea	2–0	Iran	Ho Chi Minh, Vietnam
19:45 ICT (UTC+07)	Seol Ki-hyeon 46'; Lee Dong-gook 54'			Stadium: Thong Nhat Stadium; Referee: Jerry Andres (Philippines)

7 February Dunhill Cup Vietnam	South Korea	1–0 (a.e.t.)	China	Ho Chi Minh, Vietnam
17:30 ICT (UTC+07)	Choi Chul-woo 91'			Stadium: Thong Nhat Stadium; Referee: Toru Kamikawa (Japan)

25 May 2000 Summer Olympics (Qualification)	South Korea	5–0	Sri Lanka	Seoul, South Korea
19:00 KST (UTC+09)	Kim Nam-il 3'; Lee Dong-gook 20', 44', 49'; Lee Young-pyo 48'			Stadium: Dongdaemun Stadium; Attendance: 10,000; Referee: Dmitry Roman (Uzbekistan)

27 May 2000 Summer Olympics (Qualification)	South Korea	7–0	Chinese Taipei	Seoul, South Korea
19:00 KST (UTC+09)	Park Jin-sub 14'; Ahn Hyo-yeon 18'; Lee Young-pyo 23'; Choi Chul-woo 26'; Park Dong-hyuk 34'; Seol Ki-hyeon 58'; Jeon Woo-keun 88'			Stadium: Dongdaemun Stadium; Attendance: 11,000; Referee: Ranjit Kab (Nepal)

29 May 2000 Summer Olympics (Qualification)	South Korea	7–0	Indonesia	Seoul, South Korea
19:00 KST (UTC+09)	Lee Dong-gook 1', 35', 40'; Park Jin-sub 23'; Ahn Hyo-yeon 69', 76'; Lee Kwan-woo 72'			Stadium: Olympic Stadium; Attendance: 26,500; Referee: Sun Baojie (China PR)

6 August Friendly	South Korea	0–0	Qatar	Apeldoorn, Netherlands
18:00 CEST (UTC+02)				Stadium: Sportpark Berg & Bos; Attendance: 120

14 August Friendly	Estonia	1–5	South Korea	Tallinn, Estonia
18:00 EEST (UTC+03)	Rooba 90'		Park Jae-hong 9'; Park Jae-hong 32'; Choi Chul-woo 60'; Ko Min-ki 73'; Park Dong-hyuk 90+3'	Stadium: Kadrioru Stadium; Attendance: 120; Referee: Marcus Kotter (Estonia)

18 August Friendly	Czech Republic	1–4	South Korea	Prostějov, Czech Republic
16:30 CEST (UTC+02)	Došek 58'		Park Jin-sub 13'; Park Ji-sung 79'; Ahn Hyo-yeon 89'; Na Hee-keun 90'	Stadium: Stadion 1. SK Prostějov; Attendance: 1,200; Referee: Ladislav Gadoši (Slivakia)

7 September Friendly	Japan	4–1	South Korea	Tokyo, Japan
19:00 JST (UTC+09)	Fukuda 22'; Hirase 28', 56'; Endō 60'		Choi Chul-woo 90+1'	Stadium: Yoyogi National Stadium; Attendance: 44,506; Referee: Nik Ahmad Yaqoub (Malaysia)

27 September Friendly	South Korea	0–1	Japan	Seoul, South Korea
19:00 JST (UTC+09)			Park Dong-hyuk 81' (o.g.)	Stadium: Olympic Stadium; Attendance: 42,000; Referee: Lu Jun (China PR)

3 October 2000 Summer Olympics (Qualification)	South Korea	1–0	China	Seoul, South Korea
19:00 KST (UTC+09)	Shin Byung-ho 63'			Stadium: Olympic Stadium; Attendance: 41,500; Referee: Mohamed Nazri Abdullah (Malaysia)

13 October Friendly	Saudi Arabia	1–3	South Korea	Riyadh, Saudi Arabia
19:30 EAT (UTC+03)	Al-Shayei 90+1'		Lee Kwan-woo 14'; Shin Byung-ho 41'; Park Dong-hyuk 61' (pen.)	Stadium: King Fahd International Stadium; Referee: Mamdouh Al Mirdasi (Saudi Arabia)

17 October 2000 Summer Olympics (Qualification)	Bahrain	0–1	South Korea	Riffa, Bahrain
17:45 EAT (UTC+03)			Lee Dong-gook 54'	Stadium: Bahrain National Stadium; Attendance: 1,300; Referee: Khalid Dalu (Syria)

29 October 2000 Summer Olympics (Qualification)	China	1–1	South Korea	Shanghai, China
19:45 CST (UTC+08)	Zhang Yuning 56'		Lee Dong-gook 45+2'	Stadium: Shanghai Stadium; Attendance: 60,000; Referee: Ali Abdulla Mandani (Kuwait)

13 November 2000 Summer Olympics (Qualification)	South Korea	2–1	Bahrain	Seoul, South Korea
19:00 KST (UTC+09)	Jalal 8'		Kim Eun-jung 52'; Park Jin-sub 81'	Stadium: Olympic Stadium; Attendance: 38,000; Referee: Russamee Jindamai (Thailand)

== Other matches ==
17 July 1995 1995 Merdeka Tournament	Malaysia A	2–1	South Korea	Kuala Lumpur, Malaysia
19:45	Anuar Abu Bakar 21'; Liew Kimtu 27' (pen.)		Lee Woo-young 12'	Stadium: Merdeka Stadium; Attendance: 20,000; Referee: Jamaml Al-Sharif (Syria)

19 July 1995 1995 Merdeka Tournament	Iraq A	2–2	South Korea	Kuala Lumpur, Malaysia
19:00	Jassim 60'; Abdul-Ridha 62'		Lee Woo-young 34', 50'	Stadium: Merdeka Stadium; Attendance: 10,000; Referee: Sukavit Yu-Sabai (Thailand)

1 February 1999 Dunhill Cup Vietnam	South Korea	3–0	Malaysia A	Ho Chi Minh, Vietnam
17:00 ICT (UTC+07)	Kim Do-kyun 24'; Lee Dong-gook 38'; Choi Chul-woo 88'			Stadium: Thong Nhat Stadium; Attendance: 400; Referee: Nguyen Van Mui (Vietnam)

== See also ==
- South Korea national under-23 football team results
