= Football at the 2000 Summer Olympics – Men's Asian Qualifiers =

Tournament details
- Dates: 3 April – 13 November, 1999
- Teams: 35 (from 1 confederation)

The Asian Football Confederation's Pre-Olympic Tournament was held from 3 April 1999 to 13 November 1999. Thirty-five teams entered the qualification for the three allocated spots for the 2000 Summer Olympics Men's Football tournament in Sydney.

The qualification saw Korea Republic, Japan and Kuwait winning their final round groups and qualifying to the Olympics.

== Format ==
Asian berths for the final is 3.

First round
35 teams were grouped into 9 groups, where each group would consist of round-robin tournament. The winners of each group would qualify to the finals. 12 teams from West Asia were grouped into 4 groups of 3 teams each, 5 teams from Central Asia were grouped into one group, 18 teams from East Asia, South Asia and Southeast Asia were grouped into 4 groups of 4 or 5 teams each.
Final round
9 teams were grouped into 3 groups of 3 teams each, where each group would consist of home and away round-robin tournament. The winners of each group would qualify to the finals.

== First round ==
The first round was played in nine groups held from 3 April 1999 to 24 July 1999. The winner of each group will be promoted to the final round.

=== Group 1 ===
| Rank | Team | Pld | W | D | L | GF | GA | GD | Pts |
|---|---|---|---|---|---|---|---|---|---|
| 1 | Qatar | 4 | 3 | 1 | 0 | 9 | 3 | +6 | 10 |
| 2 | United Arab Emirates | 4 | 2 | 1 | 1 | 13 | 4 | +9 | 7 |
| 3 | Yemen | 4 | 0 | 0 | 4 | 2 | 17 | −15 | 0 |

| 20 May 1999 | Yemen | 0–3 | Qatar |

| 23 May 1999 | United Arab Emirates | 6–1 | Yemen |

| 26 May 1999 | United Arab Emirates | 0–1 | Qatar |

| 1 June 1999 | Qatar | 3–1 | Yemen |

| 4 June 1999 | Yemen | 0–5 | United Arab Emirates |

| 7 June 1999 | Qatar | 2–2 | United Arab Emirates |

=== Group 2 ===
| Rank | Team | Pld | W | D | L | GF | GA | GD | Pts |
|---|---|---|---|---|---|---|---|---|---|
| 1 | Kuwait | 4 | 3 | 1 | 0 | 10 | 6 | +4 | 10 |
| 2 | Oman | 4 | 1 | 1 | 2 | 5 | 10 | −5 | 4 |
| 3 | Syria | 4 | 1 | 0 | 3 | 8 | 7 | +1 | 3 |

| 6 May 1999 | Oman | 2–2 | Kuwait |

| 14 May 1999 | Syria | 1–2 | Kuwait |

| 20 May 1999 | Oman | 1–5 | Syria |

| 25 May 1999 | Kuwait | 3–2 | Syria |

| 31 May 1999 | Syria | 0–1 | Oman |

| 5 June 1999 | Kuwait | 3–1 | Oman |

=== Group 3 ===
| Rank | Team | Pld | W | D | L | GF | GA | GD | Pts |
|---|---|---|---|---|---|---|---|---|---|
| 1 | Saudi Arabia | 4 | 2 | 2 | 0 | 8 | 4 | +4 | 8 |
| 2 | Iraq | 4 | 1 | 2 | 1 | 7 | 10 | −3 | 5 |
| 3 | Jordan | 4 | 1 | 0 | 3 | 8 | 9 | −1 | 3 |

| 1 July 1999 | Jordan | 1–3 | Saudi Arabia |

| 3 July 1999 | Iraq | 4–2 | Jordan |

| 5 July 1999 | Saudi Arabia | 1–1 | Iraq |

| 8 July 1999 | Saudi Arabia | 2–0 | Jordan |

| 10 July 1999 | Jordan | 5–0 | Iraq |

| 12 July 1999 | Iraq | 2–2 | Saudi Arabia |

=== Group 4 ===
| Rank | Team | Pld | W | D | L | GF | GA | GD | Pts |
|---|---|---|---|---|---|---|---|---|---|
| 1 | Bahrain | 4 | 3 | 0 | 1 | 7 | 3 | +4 | 9 |
| 2 | Lebanon | 4 | 1 | 1 | 2 | 4 | 5 | −1 | 4 |
| 3 | Iran | 4 | 1 | 1 | 2 | 3 | 6 | −3 | 4 |

| 14 May 1999 | Iran | 2–1 | Bahrain |

| 20 May 1999 | Bahrain | 2–1 | Lebanon |

| 6 June 1999 | Lebanon | 3–1 | Iran |

| 11 June 1999 | Bahrain | 2–0 | Iran |

| 18 June 1999 | Lebanon | 0–2 | Bahrain |

| 25 June 1999 | Iran | 1–1 | Lebanon |

=== Group 5 ===
| Rank | Team | Pld | W | D | L | GF | GA | GD | Pts |
|---|---|---|---|---|---|---|---|---|---|
| 1 | Kazakhstan | 8 | 5 | 2 | 1 | 20 | 9 | +11 | 17 |
| 2 | Uzbekistan | 8 | 5 | 1 | 2 | 15 | 7 | +8 | 16 |
| 3 | Turkmenistan | 8 | 4 | 1 | 3 | 17 | 14 | +3 | 13 |
| 4 | Kyrgyzstan | 8 | 3 | 1 | 4 | 9 | 14 | −5 | 10 |
| 5 | Tajikistan | 8 | 0 | 1 | 7 | 4 | 21 | −17 | 1 |

| 3 April 1999 | Uzbekistan | 3–1 | Kyrgyzstan |

| 3 April 1999 | Tajikistan | 1–2 | Turkmenistan |

| 10 April 1999 | Uzbekistan | 3–0 | Tajikistan |

| 24 April 1999 | Tajikistan | 0–0 | Kazakhstan |

| 24 April 1999 | Turkmenistan | 1–1 | Uzbekistan |

| 8 May 1999 | Kazakhstan | 4–1 | Turkmenistan |

| 8 May 1999 | Kyrgyzstan | 1–0 | Tajikistan |

| 15 May 1999 | Turkmenistan | 3–0 | Kyrgyzstan |

| 15 May 1999 | Uzbekistan | 0–2 | Kazakhstan |

| 29 May 1999 | Kyrgyzstan | 2–1 | Turkmenistan |

| 29 May 1999 | Kazakhstan | 3–1 | Uzbekistan |

| 5 June 1999 | Turkmenistan | 3–2 | Kazakhstan |

| 5 June 1999 | Tajikistan | 1–2 | Kyrgyzstan |

| 12 June 1999 | Kazakhstan | 5–1 | Tajikistan |

| 12 June 1999 | Uzbekistan | 3–0 | Turkmenistan |

| 19 June 1999 | Kazakhstan | 1–1 | Kyrgyzstan |

| 26 June 1999 | Tajikistan | 0–2 | Uzbekistan |

| 26 June 1999 | Kyrgyzstan | 2–3 | Kazakhstan |

| 3 July 1999 | Kyrgyzstan | 0–2 | Uzbekistan |

| 3 July 1999 | Turkmenistan | 6–1 | Tajikistan |

=== Group 6 ===
| Pos | Team | Pld | W | D | L | GF | GA | GD | Pts | Qualification |
|---|---|---|---|---|---|---|---|---|---|---|
| 1 | Japan (H) | 8 | 8 | 0 | 0 | 52 | 1 | +51 | 24 | Second round |
| 2 | Hong Kong (H) | 8 | 4 | 1 | 3 | 14 | 12 | +2 | 13 | |
| 3 | Malaysia | 8 | 3 | 2 | 3 | 17 | 17 | 0 | 11 | |
| 4 | Nepal | 8 | 2 | 2 | 4 | 9 | 23 | −14 | 8 | |
| 5 | Philippines | 8 | 0 | 1 | 7 | 4 | 43 | −39 | 1 | |

(H) Hosts

| 12 June 1999 | Philippines | 0–13 | Japan |

| 12 June 1999 | Hong Kong | 1–2 | Nepal |

| 14 June 1999 | Nepal | 0–5 | Japan |

| 14 June 1999 | Hong Kong | 2–2 | Malaysia |

| 16 June 1999 | Philippines | 0–1 | Nepal |

| 16 June 1999 | Malaysia | 0–4 | Japan |

| 18 June 1999 | Malaysia | 6–1 | Philippines |

| 18 June 1999 | Hong Kong | 1–4 | Japan |

| 20 June 1999 | Nepal | 1–1 | Malaysia |

| 20 June 1999 | Hong Kong | 4–1 | Philippines |

| 26 June 1999 | Philippines | 0–1 | Hong Kong |

| 26 June 1999 | Japan | 9–0 | Nepal |

| 28 June 1999 | Nepal | 1–2 | Hong Kong |

| 28 June 1999 | Japan | 4–0 | Malaysia |

| 30 June 1999 | Nepal | 2–2 | Philippines |

| 30 June 1999 | Malaysia | 0–3 | Hong Kong |

| 2 July 1999 | Philippines | 0–5 | Malaysia |

| 2 July 1999 | Japan | 2–0 | Hong Kong |

| 4 July 1999 | Malaysia | 3–2 | Nepal |

| 4 July 1999 | Japan | 11–0 | Philippines |

=== Group 7 ===
| Rank | Team | Pld | W | D | L | GF | GA | GD | Pts | Qualification |
|---|---|---|---|---|---|---|---|---|---|---|
| 1 | China | 6 | 6 | 0 | 0 | 20 | 0 | +20 | 18 | Advance to the final round |
| 2 | North Korea | 6 | 3 | 1 | 2 | 10 | 5 | +5 | 10 | |
| 3 | Myanmar | 6 | 1 | 1 | 4 | 2 | 18 | −16 | 4 | |
| 4 | Vietnam | 6 | 0 | 2 | 4 | 3 | 12 | −9 | 2 | |

| 23 May 1999 | Myanmar | 0–1 | North Korea |

| 23 May 1999 | Vietnam | 0–4 | China |

| 26 May 1999 | Vietnam | 1–2 | North Korea |

| 26 May 1999 | Myanmar | 0–4 | China |

| 29 May 1999 | Vietnam | 1–2 | Myanmar |

| 29 May 1999 | North Korea | 0–1 | China |

| 12 June 1999 | North Korea | 6–0 | Myanmar |

| 12 June 1999 | China | 3–0 | Vietnam |

| 15 June 1999 | North Korea | 1–1 | Vietnam |

| 15 June 1999 | China | 6–0 | Myanmar |

| 18 June 1999 | Myanmar | 0–0 | Vietnam |

| 18 June 1999 | China | 2–0 | North Korea |

=== Group 8 ===
| Rank | Team | Pld | W | D | L | GF | GA | GD | Pts |
|---|---|---|---|---|---|---|---|---|---|
| 1 | South Korea | 3 | 3 | 0 | 0 | 19 | 0 | +19 | 9 |
| 2 | Indonesia | 3 | 2 | 0 | 1 | 4 | 9 | −5 | 6 |
| 3 | Chinese Taipei | 3 | 1 | 0 | 2 | 5 | 10 | −5 | 3 |
| 4 | Sri Lanka | 3 | 0 | 0 | 3 | 2 | 11 | −9 | 0 |

| 25 May 1999 | Chinese Taipei | 1–2 | Indonesia |

| 25 May 1999 | South Korea | 5–0 | Sri Lanka |
| | Kim Nam-il 3'; Lee Dong-gook 20' 44' 49'; Seol Ki-hyeon 48' |

| 27 May 1999 | Indonesia | 2–1 | Sri Lanka |

| 27 May 1999 | South Korea | 7–0 | Chinese Taipei |
| | Park Jin-sub 14'; Ahn Hyo-yeon 18'; Lee Young-pyo 23'; Choi Chul-woo 26'; Park Dong-hyuk 34'; Jeon Woo-keun 88' |

| 29 May 1999 | Chinese Taipei | 4–1 | Sri Lanka |

| 29 May 1999 | South Korea | 7–0 | Indonesia |
| | Lee Dong-gook 1' 35' 40'; Park Jin-sub 23'; Ahn Hyo-yeon 69' 76'; Lee Kwan-woo 72' |

=== Group 9 ===
| Rank | Team | Pld | W | D | L | GF | GA | GD | Pts |
|---|---|---|---|---|---|---|---|---|---|
| 1 | Thailand | 2 | 1 | 1 | 0 | 2 | 0 | +2 | 4 |
| 2 | India | 2 | 0 | 1 | 1 | 0 | 2 | −2 | 1 |

| 17 July 1999 | Thailand | 2–0 | India |

| 24 July 1999 | India | 0–0 | Thailand |

== Final round ==
The final round was played in three groups of three teams each held from 1 October to 13 November 1999. The winner of each group will represent Asia at the 2000 Olympic Games.

=== Group A ===
| Rank | Team | Pld | W | D | L | GF | GA | GD | Pts |
|---|---|---|---|---|---|---|---|---|---|
| 1 | Kuwait | 4 | 3 | 0 | 1 | 10 | 3 | +7 | 9 |
| 2 | Saudi Arabia | 4 | 2 | 0 | 2 | 5 | 8 | –3 | 6 |
| 3 | Qatar | 4 | 1 | 0 | 3 | 5 | 9 | –4 | 3 |

| 1 October 1999 | Qatar | 4 – 1 | Saudi Arabia |

| 8 October 1999 | Saudi Arabia | 2 – 1 | Kuwait |

| 15 October 1999 | Kuwait | 4 – 0 | Qatar |

| 29 October 1999 | Saudi Arabia | 2 – 0 | Qatar |

| 7 November 1999 | Kuwait | 3 – 0 | Saudi Arabia |

| 12 November 1999 | Qatar | 1 – 2 | Kuwait |

Kuwait qualify to the 2000 Summer Olympics Football tournament in Sydney.

=== Group B ===
| Rank | Team | Pld | W | D | L | GF | GA | GD | Pts |
|---|---|---|---|---|---|---|---|---|---|
| 1 | South Korea | 4 | 3 | 1 | 0 | 5 | 2 | +3 | 10 |
| 2 | China | 4 | 1 | 1 | 2 | 3 | 4 | –1 | 4 |
| 3 | Bahrain | 4 | 1 | 0 | 3 | 3 | 5 | –2 | 3 |

| 3 October 1999 | South Korea | 1 – 0 | China |
| | Sin Byung-ho 63' |

| 10 October 1999 | China | 2 – 1 | Bahrain |

| 17 October 1999 | Bahrain | 0 – 1 | South Korea |
| | | | Lee Dong-gook 54' |

| 29 October 1999 | China | 1 – 1 | South Korea |
| | Zhang Yuning 57' | | Lee Dong-gook 45' |

| 5 November 1999 | Bahrain | 1 – 0 | China |

| 13 November 1999 | South Korea | 2 – 1 | Bahrain |
| | Kim Eun-jung 52'; Park Jin-sub 81' | | Mahmood Jalal 8' |

South Korea qualify to the 2000 Summer Olympics Football tournament in Sydney.

=== Group C ===
| Rank | Team | Pld | W | D | L | GF | GA | GD | Pts |
|---|---|---|---|---|---|---|---|---|---|
| 1 | Japan | 4 | 4 | 0 | 0 | 14 | 2 | +12 | 12 |
| 2 | Kazakhstan | 4 | 1 | 1 | 2 | 5 | 6 | –1 | 4 |
| 3 | Thailand | 4 | 0 | 1 | 3 | 2 | 13 | –11 | 1 |

| 2 October 1999 | Kazakhstan | 0 – 0 | Thailand |

| 9 October 1999 | Kazakhstan | 0 – 2 | Japan |

| 17 October 1999 | Japan | 3 – 1 | Thailand |

| 30 October 1999 | Thailand | 1 – 4 | Kazakhstan |

| 6 November 1999 | Japan | 3 – 1 | Kazakhstan |

| 13 November 1999 | Thailand | 0 – 6 | Japan |

Japan qualify to the 2000 Summer Olympics Football tournament in Sydney.
