= South Korea national football team results (2000–2009) =

- Win Draw Loss

This is a list of football games played by the South Korea national football team between 2000 and 2009.

== Results by year ==
Year	Pld	W	D	L	Win %
2000	22	12	8	2	54.55
2001	16	8	4	4	50.00
2002	22	6	8	8	27.27
2003	15	7	2	6	46.67
2004	17	10	5	2	58.82
2005	17	6	6	5	35.29
2006	22	9	6	7	40.91
2007	11	4	4	3	36.36
2008	16	8	7	1	50.00
2009	13	6	6	1	46.15
Total	171	76	56	39	44.44

== Matches ==
=== 2000 ===
21 January Friendly	New Zealand	0–1	South Korea	Auckland, New Zealand
			Seo Dong-won 66'

23 January Friendly	New Zealand	0–0	South Korea	Palmerston North, New Zealand

15 February 2000 CONCACAF Gold Cup (Group D)	South Korea	0–0	Canada	Los Angeles, United States

17 February 2000 CONCACAF Gold Cup (Group D)	South Korea	2–2	Costa Rica	Los Angeles, United States
	Lee Dong-gook 14'; Lee Min-sung 74'		Wanchope 66'; Medford 85'

5 April 2000 AFC Asian Cup (Qualification)	South Korea	9–0	Laos	Seoul, South Korea
	Sim Jae-won 32'; Kim Eun-jung 45', 67', 71'; Lee Chun-soo 50'; Seol Ki-hyeon 58', 77', 86'; Ahn Hyo-yeon 75'

7 April 2000 AFC Asian Cup (Qualification)	South Korea	6–0	Mongolia	Seoul, South Korea
	Ahn Hyo-yeon 20', 23'; Choi Tae-uk 37', 88'; Choi Chul-woo 46'; Lee Chun-soo 71'

9 April 2000 AFC Asian Cup (Qualification)	South Korea	4–0	Myanmar	Seoul, South Korea
	Seol Ki-hyeon 61', 67'; Ahn Hyo-yeon 78', 89'

26 April Friendly	South Korea	1–0	Japan	Seoul, South Korea
	Ha Seok-ju 78'

28 May Friendly	South Korea	0–0	FR Yugoslavia	Seoul, South Korea

30 May Friendly	South Korea	0–0	FR Yugoslavia	Seoul, South Korea

7 June 2000 LG Cup	South Korea	2–1	Macedonia	Teheran, Iran
	Choi Chul-woo 47'; Park Ji-sung 63'		Šakiri 89'

9 June 2000 LG Cup	South Korea	1–0	Egypt	Teheran, Iran
	Park Kang-jo 63'

28 July Friendly	China	0–1	South Korea	Beijing, China
			Lee Young-pyo 52'

4 October 2000 LG Cup	United Arab Emirates	1–1 (a.e.t.) (3–2 p)	South Korea	Abu Dhabi, United Arab Emirates
	Y. S. Ali 34'		Lee Young-pyo 89'

7 October 2000 LG Cup	South Korea	4–2	Australia	Abu Dhabi, United Arab Emirates
	Sim Jae-won 44'; Noh Jung-yoon 48'; Seol Ki-hyeon 64'; Lee Dong-gook 90'		Agostino 30', 36'

13 October 2000 AFC Asian Cup (Group B)	South Korea	2–2	China	Tripoli, Lebanon
17:05	Lee Young-pyo 30'; Noh Jung-yoon 58'	Report	Su Maozhen 36'; Fan Zhiyi 66' (pen.)	Stadium: International Olympic Stadium; Attendance: 1,000; Referee: Omer Al-Mehannah (Saudi Arabia)

16 October 2000 AFC Asian Cup (Group B)	South Korea	0–1	Kuwait	Tripoli, Lebanon
19:45		Report	Al-Huwaidi 43'	Stadium: International Olympic Stadium; Attendance: 5,000; Referee: Brian Hall (United States)

19 October 2000 AFC Asian Cup (Group B)	South Korea	3–0	Indonesia	Beirut, Lebanon
19:35	Lee Dong-gook 30', 76', 90+1'	Report		Stadium: Sports City Stadium; Attendance: 500; Referee: Toru Kamikawa (Japan)

23 October 2000 AFC Asian Cup (Quarter-finals)	South Korea	2–1 (a.e.t.)	Iran	Tripoli, Lebanon
16:45	Kim Sang-sik 90'; Lee Dong-gook 99'	Report	Bagheri 71'	Stadium: International Olympic Stadium; Attendance: 5,000; Referee: Ali Bujsaim (UAE)

26 October 2000 AFC Asian Cup (Semi-finals)	South Korea	1–2	Saudi Arabia	Beirut, Lebanon
16:45	Lee Dong-gook 90+1'	Report	Al-Meshal 76', 80'	Stadium: Sports City Stadium; Attendance: 7,000; Referee: Saad Kamil Al-Fadhli (Kuwait)

29 October 2000 AFC Asian Cup (Third place match)	South Korea	1–0	China	Beirut, Lebanon
17:05	Lee Dong-gook 76'	Report		Stadium: Sports City Stadium; Attendance: 20,000; Referee: Nabil Ayad (Lebanon)

20 December Friendly	Japan	1–1	South Korea	Yokohama, Japan
	Hattori 56'		Ahn Jung-hwan 14'

=== 2001 ===
24 January 2001 Lunar New Year Cup	South Korea	2–3	Norway	Hong Kong
	Ko Jong-soo 24' (pen.); Kim Do-hoon 66'	Report 1 Report 2	Johnsen (Note: The KFA wrote Tommy Øren as Norway's third goalscorer in its website unlike other websites.) 35', 69'; Helstad 42'

27 January 2001 Lunar New Year Cup	South Korea	1–1 (a.e.t.) (6–5 p)	Paraguay	Hong Kong
	Ko Jong-soo 56'		Morínigo 68'

11 February Dubai Tournament	United Arab Emirates	1–4	South Korea	Dubai, United Arab Emirates
	Juma 24'		Song Chong-gug 45'; Yoo Sang-chul 65'; Seol Ki-hyeon 72'; Ko Jong-soo 89'

24 April 2001 LG Cup	South Korea	1–0	Iran	Cairo, Egypt
	Kim Do-hoon 6' (pen.)

26 April 2001 LG Cup	Egypt	1–2	South Korea	Cairo, Egypt
	Abdel-Rahman 21'		Ha Seok-ju 12'; Ahn Hyo-yeon 61'

25 May Friendly	South Korea	0–0	Cameroon	Suwon, South Korea

30 May 2001 FIFA Confederations Cup (Group A)	South Korea	0–5	France	Daegu, South Korea
			Marlet 9'; Vieira 19'; Anelka 34'; Djorkaeff 80'; Wiltord 90'

1 June 2001 FIFA Confederations Cup (Group A)	South Korea	2–1	Mexico	Ulsan, South Korea
	Hwang Sun-hong 56'; Yoo Sang-chul 90'		V. Ruiz 81'

3 June 2001 FIFA Confederations Cup (Group A)	South Korea	1–0	Australia	Suwon, South Korea
	Hwang Sun-hong 24'

15 August Friendly	Czech Republic	5–0	South Korea	Drnovice, Czech Republic
	Nedvěd 29'; Baranek 65', 85', 90+2'; Lokvenc 74'			Stadium: Sportovní areál

13 September Friendly	South Korea	2–2	Nigeria	Daejeon, South Korea
	Lee Chun-soo 65'; Choi Yong-soo 77'		Chukwu 8', 38'

16 September Friendly	South Korea	2–1	Nigeria	Busan, South Korea
	Kim Do-hoon 58' (pen.); Lee Dong-gook 90+1'		Chukwu 61'

8 November Friendly	South Korea	0–1	Senegal	Jeonju, South Korea
			Bouba Diop 42'

10 November Friendly	South Korea	2–0	Croatia	Seoul, South Korea
	Choi Tae-uk 63'; Kim Nam-il 66'

13 November Friendly	South Korea	1–1	Croatia	Gwangju, South Korea
	Choi Yong-soo 42'		Živković 62'

9 December Friendly	South Korea	1–0	United States	Seogwipo, South Korea
	Yoo Sang-chul 20'

=== 2002 ===
19 January 2002 CONCACAF Gold Cup (Group B)	United States	2–1	South Korea	Los Angeles, United States
	Donovan 33'; Beasley 90+3'		Song Chong-gug 37'

23 January 2002 CONCACAF Gold Cup (Group B)	South Korea	0–0	Cuba	San Francisco, United States

27 January 2002 CONCACAF Gold Cup (Quarter-finals)	South Korea	0–0 (a.e.t.) (4–2 p)	Mexico	Los Angeles, United States
	Penalties
	Lee Eul-yong (penalty scored); Lee Dong-gook (penalty scored); Choi Sung-yong (penalty scored); Lee Young-pyo (penalty scored)		(penalty scored) Noriega; (penalty scored) De Anda; (penalty missed) Sosa; (penalty missed) Hierro

30 January 2002 CONCACAF Gold Cup (Semi-finals)	South Korea	1–3	Costa Rica	Anaheim, United States
	Choi Jin-cheul 80'		Gómez 43'; Wanchope 76', 81'

2 February 2002 CONCACAF Gold Cup (Third place match)	South Korea	1–2	Canada	San Diego, United States
	Kim Do-hoon 15'		Kim Do-hoon 33' (o.g.); De Rosario 34'

13 February Friendly	Uruguay	2–1	South Korea	Montevideo, Uruguay
	Abreu 6', 65'		Kim Do-hoon 26'

13 March Friendly	Tunisia	0–0	South Korea	Tunis, Tunisia

20 March Friendly	South Korea	2–0	Finland	Cartagena, Spain
	Hwang Sun-hong 86', 87'

26 March Friendly	South Korea	0–0	Turkey	Bochum, Germany
		(Report)		Stadium: Ruhrstadion; Attendance: 21,675; Referee: (Germany) Lutz Michael Fröhlich

20 April Friendly	South Korea	2–0	Costa Rica	Daegu, South Korea
	Cha Du-ri 24'; Choi Tae-uk 83'

27 April Friendly	South Korea	0–0	China	Incheon, South Korea

16 May Friendly	South Korea	4–1	Scotland	Busan, South Korea
	Lee Chun-soo 14'; Ahn Jung-hwan 57', 87'; Yoon Jung-hwan 67'		Dobie 74'

21 May Friendly	South Korea	1–1	England	Seogwipo, South Korea
	Park Ji-sung 51'		Owen 26'

26 May Friendly	South Korea	2–3	France	Suwon, South Korea
	Park Ji-sung 26'; Seol Ki-hyeon 41'		Trezeguet 16'; Dugarry 53'; Leboeuf 90'

4 June 2002 FIFA World Cup (Group D)	South Korea	2–0	Poland	Busan, South Korea
	Hwang Sun-hong 26'; Yoo Sang-chul 53'

10 June 2002 FIFA World Cup (Group D)	South Korea	1–1	United States	Daegu, South Korea
	Ahn Jung-hwan 78'		Mathis 24'

14 June 2002 FIFA World Cup (Group D)	South Korea	1–0	Portugal	Incheon, South Korea
	Park Ji-sung 70'

18 June 2002 FIFA World Cup (Round of 16)	South Korea	2–1 (a.e.t.)	Italy	Daejeon, South Korea
	Seol Ki-hyeon 88'; Ahn Jung-hwan 117'		Vieri 18'

22 June 2002 FIFA World Cup (Quarter-finals)	South Korea	0–0 (a.e.t.) (5–3 p)	Spain	Gwangju, South Korea
	Penalties
	Hwang Sun-hong (penalty scored); Park Ji-sung (penalty scored); Seol Ki-hyeon (penalty scored); Ahn Jung-hwan (penalty scored); Hong Myung-bo (penalty scored)		(penalty scored) Hierro; (penalty scored) Baraja; (penalty scored) Xavi; (penalty missed) Joaquín

25 June 2002 FIFA World Cup (Semi-finals)	South Korea	0–1	Germany	Seoul, South Korea
			Ballack 75'

29 June 2002 FIFA World Cup (Third place match)	South Korea	2–3	Turkey	Daegu, South Korea
	Lee Eul-yong 9'; Song Chong-gug 90+3'	(Report)	Şükür 1'; Mansız 13', 32'	Stadium: World Cup Stadium; Attendance: 63,483; Referee: (Kuwait) Saad Mane

20 November Friendly	South Korea	2–3	Brazil	Seoul, South Korea
	Seol Ki-hyeon 7'; Ahn Jung-hwan 58'		Ronaldo 16', 67'; Ronaldinho 90+3'

=== 2003 ===
29 March Friendly	South Korea	0–0	Colombia	Busan, South Korea

16 April Friendly	South Korea	0–1	Japan	Seoul, South Korea
			Cho Byung-kuk 90+2' (o.g.)

31 May Friendly	Japan	0–1	South Korea	Tokyo, Japan
			Ahn Jung-hwan 86'

8 June Friendly	South Korea	0–2	Uruguay	Seoul, South Korea
			Hornos 14'; Abreu 53'

11 June Friendly	South Korea	0–1	Argentina	Seoul, South Korea
			Saviola 43'

25 September 2004 AFC Asian Cup (Qualification)	South Korea	5–0	Vietnam	Incheon, South Korea
	Lee Ki-hyung 35'; Cho Jae-jin 49'; Kim Do-hoon 68'; Kim Dae-eui 72'; Woo Sung-yong 86'

27 September 2004 AFC Asian Cup (Qualification)	South Korea	1–0	Oman	Incheon, South Korea
	Choi Sung-kuk 46'

29 September 2004 AFC Asian Cup (Qualification)	South Korea	16–0	Nepal	Incheon, South Korea
	Kim Dae-eui 18', 37'; Woo Sung-yong 21', 46', 48'; Park Jin-sub 22', 28', 64', 67', 89'; Lee Eul-yong 54'; Lee Kwan-woo 57'; Kim Do-hoon 75', 84', 86'; Chung Kyung-ho 80'

19 October 2004 AFC Asian Cup (Qualification)	South Korea	0–1	Vietnam	Muscat, Oman
			Phạm Văn Quyến 74'

21 October 2004 AFC Asian Cup (Qualification)	Oman	3–1	South Korea	Muscat, Oman
	Said 60'; Hashim 64'; Fawzi 88'		Chung Kyung-ho 47'

24 October 2004 AFC Asian Cup (Qualification)	South Korea	7–0	Nepal	Muscat, Oman
	Cho Jae-jin 1'; Lee Ki-hyung 5', 51'; Kim Do-hoon 15' (pen.), 31', 33'; Chung Kyung-ho 36'

18 November Friendly	South Korea	0–1	Bulgaria	Seoul, South Korea
			Manchev 20'

4 December 2003 EAFF Championship	South Korea	3–1	Hong Kong	Tokyo, Japan
	Kim Do-heon 22'; Kim Do-hoon 49'; Ahn Jung-hwan 56'		Akandu 33'

7 December 2003 EAFF Championship	South Korea	1–0	China	Saitama, Japan
	Yoo Sang-chul 45'

10 December 2003 EAFF Championship	Japan	0–0	South Korea	Yokohama, Japan

=== 2004 ===
14 February Friendly	South Korea	5–0	Oman	Ulsan, South Korea
	Al-Noobi 8' (o.g.); Seol Ki-hyeon 24'; Ahn Jung-hwan 41' (pen.), 60'; Rabee'a 86' (o.g.)

18 February 2006 FIFA World Cup (Qualification)	South Korea	2–0	Lebanon	Suwon, South Korea
	Cha Du-ri 32'; Cho Byung-kuk 50'

31 March 2006 FIFA World Cup (Qualification)	Maldives	0–0	South Korea	Malé, Maldives

28 April Friendly	South Korea	0–0	Paraguay	Incheon, South Korea

2 June Friendly	South Korea	0–1	Turkey	Seoul, South Korea
		(Report)	Şükür 21'	Stadium: World Cup Stadium; Attendance: 51,185; Referee: (Singapore) Shamsul Maidin

5 June Friendly	South Korea	2–1	Turkey	Daegu, South Korea
	Yoo Sang-chul 66' (pen.); Kim Eun-jung 77'	(Report)	Şükür 43'	Stadium: World Cup Stadium; Attendance: 45,284; Referee: (Japan) Toshimitsu Yoshida

9 June 2006 FIFA World Cup (Qualification)	South Korea	2–0	Vietnam	Daejeon, South Korea
	Ahn Jung-hwan 29'; Kim Do-heon 61'

10 July Friendly	South Korea	2–0	Bahrain	Gwangju, South Korea
	Lee Dong-gook 2'; Choi Jin-cheul 40'

14 July Friendly	South Korea	1–1	Trinidad and Tobago	Seoul, South Korea
	Cha Du-ri 52'		Scotland 77'

19 July 2004 AFC Asian Cup (Group B)	South Korea	0–0	Jordan	Jinan, China

23 July 2004 AFC Asian Cup (Group B)	South Korea	2–0	United Arab Emirates	Jinan, China
	Lee Dong-gook 40'; Ahn Jung-hwan 90+1'

27 July 2004 AFC Asian Cup (Group B)	South Korea	4–0	Kuwait	Jinan, China
	Lee Dong-gook 24', 41'; Cha Du-ri 45'; Ahn Jung-hwan 75'

31 July 2004 AFC Asian Cup (Quarter-finals)	South Korea	3–4	Iran	Jinan, China
	Seol Ki-hyeon 15'; Lee Dong-gook 24'; Kim Nam-il 68'		Karimi 9', 19', 77'; Park Jin-sub 50' (o.g.)

8 September 2006 FIFA World Cup (Qualification)	Vietnam	1–2	South Korea	Saigon, Vietnam
	Park Jae-hong 49' (o.g.)		Lee Dong-gook 63'; Lee Chun-soo 75'

13 October 2006 FIFA World Cup (Qualification)	Lebanon	1–1	South Korea	Beirut, Lebanon
	Nasseredine 27'		Choi Jin-cheul 7'

17 November 2006 FIFA World Cup (Qualification)	South Korea	2–0	Maldives	Seoul, South Korea
	Kim Do-heon 65'; Lee Dong-gook 79'

19 December Friendly	South Korea	3–1	Germany	Busan, South Korea
	Kim Dong-jin 16'; Lee Dong-gook 71'; Cho Jae-jin 87'		Ballack 24'

=== 2005 ===
15 January Friendly	South Korea	1–2	Colombia	Los Angeles, United States
	Chung Kyung-ho 2'		Castillo 41'; Perea 75'

19 January Friendly	South Korea	1–1	Paraguay	Los Angeles, United States
	Kim Jin-kyu 46'	Report	Cardozo 45+1' (pen.)

22 January Friendly	South Korea	1–1	Sweden	Carson, United States
	Chung Kyung-ho 70'		Rosenberg 86'

4 February Friendly	South Korea	0–1	Egypt	Seoul, South Korea
			Moteab 14'

9 February 2006 FIFA World Cup (Qualification)	South Korea	2–0	Kuwait	Seoul, South Korea
	Lee Dong-gook 23'; Lee Young-pyo 80'

20 March Friendly	South Korea	1–0	Burkina Faso	Dubai, United Arab Emirates
	Kim Sang-sik 65'

25 March 2006 FIFA World Cup (Qualification)	Saudi Arabia	2–0	South Korea	Dammam, Saudi Arabia
	Kariri 29'; Al-Qahtani 75'

30 March 2006 FIFA World Cup (Qualification)	South Korea	2–1	Uzbekistan	Seoul, South Korea
	Lee Young-pyo 54'; Lee Dong-gook 62'		Geynrikh 78'

3 June 2006 FIFA World Cup (Qualification)	Uzbekistan	1–1	South Korea	Tashkent, Uzbekistan
	Shatskikh 63'		Park Chu-young 90'

8 June 2006 FIFA World Cup (Qualification)	Kuwait	0–4	South Korea	Kuwait City, Kuwait
			Park Chu-young 18'; Lee Dong-gook 28' (pen.); Chung Kyung-ho 54'; Park Ji-sung 60'

31 July 2005 EAFF Championship	South Korea	1–1	China	Daejeon, South Korea
	Kim Jin-kyu 73'		Sun Xiang 52'

4 August 2005 EAFF Championship	South Korea	0–0	North Korea	Jeonju, South Korea

8 August 2005 EAFF Championship	South Korea	0–1	Japan	Daegu, South Korea
			Nakazawa 86'

14 August Friendly	South Korea	3–0 (Note: Not recognised as international "A" match.)	North Korea	Seoul, South Korea
	Chung Kyung-ho 34'; Kim Jin-yong 36'; Park Chu-young 68'

17 August 2006 FIFA World Cup (Qualification)	South Korea	0–1	Saudi Arabia	Seoul, South Korea
			Al-Anbar 4'

12 October Friendly	South Korea	2–0	Iran	Seoul, South Korea
	Cho Won-hee 1'; Kim Jin-kyu 90'

12 November Friendly	South Korea	2–2	Sweden	Seoul, South Korea
	Ahn Jung-hwan 7'; Kim Young-chul 51'		Linderoth 8'; Rosenberg 56'

16 November Friendly	South Korea	2–0	Serbia and Montenegro	Seoul, South Korea
	Choi Jin-cheul 4'; Lee Dong-gook 66'

=== 2006 ===
18 January Friendly	United Arab Emirates	1–0	South Korea	Dubai, United Arab Emirates
	Khalil 22'

21 January 2006 LG Cup	South Korea	1–1	Greece	Riyadh, Saudi Arabia
	Park Chu-young 24'		Zagorakis 10'

25 January 2006 LG Cup	South Korea	1–0	Finland	Riyadh, Saudi Arabia
	Park Chu-young 46'

29 January 2006 Lunar New Year Cup	South Korea	2–0	Croatia	Hong Kong
	Kim Dong-jin 35'; Lee Chun-soo 49'

1 February 2006 Lunar New Year Cup	South Korea	1–3	Denmark	Hong Kong
	Cho Jae-jin 13'		Jacobsen 43'; Bech 64'; Silberbauer 88'

11 February Friendly	South Korea	0–1	Costa Rica	Oakland, United States
			Saborío 40'

15 February Friendly	South Korea	1–0	Mexico	Los Angeles, United States
	Lee Dong-gook 15'

22 February 2007 AFC Asian Cup (Qualification)	Syria	1–2	South Korea	Aleppo, Syria
	Al-Khatib 48'		Kim Do-heon 4'; Lee Chun-soo 49'

1 March Friendly	South Korea	1–0	Angola	Seoul, South Korea
	Park Chu-young 22'

23 May Friendly	South Korea	1–1	Senegal	Seoul, South Korea
	Kim Do-heon 74'		N'Diaye 80'

26 May Friendly	South Korea	2–0	Bosnia and Herzegovina	Seoul, South Korea
	Seol Ki-hyeon 50'; Cho Jae-jin 90+2'

1 June Friendly	Norway	0–0	South Korea	Oslo, Norway

4 June Friendly	South Korea	1–3	Ghana	Edinburgh, Scotland
	Lee Eul-yong 50'		Gyan 36'; Muntari 62'; Essien 80'

13 June 2006 FIFA World Cup (Group G)	South Korea	2–1	Togo	Frankfurt, Germany
	Lee Chun-soo 54'; Ahn Jung-hwan 72'		Kader 31'

18 June 2006 FIFA World Cup (Group G)	South Korea	1–1	France	Leipzig, Germany
	Park Ji-sung 81'		Henry 9'

23 June 2006 FIFA World Cup (Group G)	South Korea	0–2	Switzerland	Hanover, Germany
			Senderos 23'; Frei 77'

16 August 2007 AFC Asian Cup (Qualification)	Chinese Taipei	0–3	South Korea	Taipei, Republic of China
			Ahn Jung-hwan 31'; Jung Jo-gook 55'; Kim Do-heon 81'

2 September 2007 AFC Asian Cup (Qualification)	South Korea	1–1	Iran	Seoul, South Korea
	Seol Ki-hyeon 45'		Hashemian 90+2'

6 September 2007 AFC Asian Cup (Qualification)	South Korea	8–0	Chinese Taipei	Suwon, South Korea
	Seol Ki-hyeon 3', 43'; Jung Jo-gook 5', 45', 89'; Cho Jae-jin 64', 83'; Kim Do-heon 78'

8 October Friendly	South Korea	1–3	Ghana	Seoul, South Korea
	Kim Dong-hyun 63'		Gyan 48', 83'; Essien 58'

11 October 2007 AFC Asian Cup (Qualification)	South Korea	1–1	Syria	Seoul, South Korea
	Cho Jae-jin 8'		Al-Sayed 18'

15 November 2007 AFC Asian Cup (Qualification)	Iran	2–0	South Korea	Tehran, Iran
	Enayati 48'; Badamaki 90+1'

=== 2007 ===
6 February Friendly	South Korea	1–0	Greece	London, England
	Lee Chun-soo 78'

24 March Friendly	South Korea	0–2	Uruguay	Seoul, South Korea
			Bueno 19', 37'

2 June Friendly	South Korea	0–2	Netherlands	Seoul, South Korea
			Van der Vaart 31', 71'

29 June Friendly	South Korea	3–0	Iraq	Seogwipo, South Korea
	Yeom Ki-hun 50'; Lee Chun-soo 79'; Lee Keun-ho 85'

5 July Friendly	South Korea	2–1	Uzbekistan	Seoul, South Korea
	Cho Jae-jin 5', 19'		Djeparov 60'

11 July 2007 AFC Asian Cup (Group D)	South Korea	1–1	Saudi Arabia	Jakarta, Indonesia
	Choi Sung-kuk 65'		Al-Qahtani 77' (pen.)

15 July 2007 AFC Asian Cup (Group D)	South Korea	1–2	Bahrain	Jakarta, Indonesia
	Kim Do-heon 4'		Isa 43'; Abdullatif 85'

18 July 2007 AFC Asian Cup (Group D)	Indonesia	0–1	South Korea	Jakarta, Indonesia
			Kim Jung-woo 34'

22 July 2007 AFC Asian Cup (Quarter-finals)	South Korea	0–0 (a.e.t.) (4–2 p)	Iran	Kuala Lumpur, Malaysia
	Penalties
	Lee Chun-soo (penalty scored); Kim Sang-sik (penalty scored); Kim Do-heon (penalty missed); Cho Jae-jin (penalty scored); Kim Jung-woo (penalty scored)		(penalty scored) Zandi; (penalty missed) Mahdavikia; (penalty scored) Enayati; (penalty missed) Khatibi

25 July 2007 AFC Asian Cup (Semi-finals)	South Korea	0–0 (a.e.t.) (3–4 p)	Iraq	Kuala Lumpur, Malaysia
	Penalties
	Lee Chun-soo (penalty scored); Lee Dong-Gook (penalty scored); Cho Jae-Jin (penalty scored); Yeom Ki-Hun (penalty missed); Kim Jung-woo (penalty missed)		(penalty scored) Mulla Mohammed; (penalty scored) Munir; (penalty scored) Abdul-Amir; (penalty scored) Mnajed

28 July 2007 AFC Asian Cup (Third place match)	South Korea	0–0 (a.e.t.) (6–5 p)	Japan	Palembang, Indonesia
	Penalties
	Cho Jae-jin (penalty scored); Oh Beom-seok (penalty scored); Lee Chun-soo (penalty scored); Lee Ho (penalty scored); Kim Jin-kyu (penalty scored); Kim Chi-woo (penalty scored)		(penalty scored) S. Nakamura; (penalty scored) Endō; (penalty scored) Abe; (penalty scored) Komano; (penalty scored) Nakazawa; (penalty missed) Hanyu

=== 2008 ===
30 January Friendly	South Korea	0–1	Chile	Seoul, South Korea
			Fierro 54'

6 February 2010 FIFA World Cup (Qualification)	South Korea	4–0	Turkmenistan	Seoul, South Korea
	Kwak Tae-hwi 43'; Seol Ki-hyeon 57', 83'; Park Ji-sung 70'

17 February 2008 EAFF Championship	China	2–3	South Korea	Chongqing, China
	Zhou Haibin 46'; Liu Jian 61'		Park Chu-young 42', 63'; Kwak Tae-hwi 90+1'

20 February 2008 EAFF Championship	South Korea	1–1	North Korea	Chongqing, China
	Yeom Ki-hun 20'		Jong Tae-se 72'

23 February 2008 EAFF Championship	South Korea	1–1	Japan	Chongqing, China
	Yeom Ki-hun 15'		Yamase 67'

26 March 2010 FIFA World Cup (Qualification)	South Korea	0–0	North Korea	Shanghai, China

31 May 2010 FIFA World Cup (Qualification)	South Korea	2–2	Jordan	Seoul, South Korea
	Park Ji-sung 39'; Park Chu-young 48' (pen.)		Abdel-Fattah 73', 80'

7 June 2010 FIFA World Cup (Qualification)	Jordan	0–1	South Korea	Amman, Jordan
			Park Chu-young 24' (pen.)

14 June 2010 FIFA World Cup (Qualification)	Turkmenistan	1–3	South Korea	Ashgabat, Turkmenistan
	Öwekow 77' (pen.)		Kim Do-heon 14', 86', 90+3' (pen.)

22 June 2010 FIFA World Cup (Qualification)	South Korea	0–0	North Korea	Seoul, South Korea

5 September Friendly	South Korea	1–0	Jordan	Seoul, South Korea
	Lee Chung-yong 5'

10 September 2010 FIFA World Cup (Qualification)	South Korea	1–1	North Korea	Shanghai, China
	Ki Sung-yueng 69'		Hong Yong-jo 64' (pen.)

11 October Friendly	South Korea	3–0	Uzbekistan	Suwon, South Korea
	Ki Sung-yueng 3'; Lee Keun-ho 72', 85'

15 October 2010 FIFA World Cup (Qualification)	South Korea	4–1	United Arab Emirates	Seoul, South Korea
	Lee Keun-ho 20', 80'; Park Ji-sung 26'; Kwak Tae-hwi 89'		Al Hammadi 72'

14 November Friendly	Qatar	1–1	South Korea	Doha, Qatar
	Fábio 73'		Lee Chung-yong 6'

19 November 2010 FIFA World Cup (Qualification)	Saudi Arabia	0–2	South Korea	Riyadh, Saudi Arabia
			Lee Keun-ho 76'; Park Chu-young 90+2'

=== 2009 ===
1 February Friendly	South Korea	1–1	Syria	Dubai, United Arab Emirates
	Al Aitoni 80' (o.g.)		Al-Rashed 90'

4 February Friendly	South Korea	2–2	Bahrain	Dubai, United Arab Emirates
	Kim Jung-woo 79'; Lee Keun-ho 90+3'		Aaish 63' (pen.); Abdulrahman 82'

11 February 2010 FIFA World Cup (Qualification)	Iran	1–1	South Korea	Tehran, Iran
	Nekounam 58'		Park Ji-sung 81'

28 March Friendly	South Korea	2–1	Iraq	Suwon, South Korea
	Kim Chi-woo 57'; Lee Keun-ho 70' (pen.)		Hwang Jae-won 52' (o.g.)

1 April 2010 FIFA World Cup (Qualification)	South Korea	1–0	North Korea	Seoul, South Korea
	Kim Chi-woo 87'

2 June Friendly	South Korea	0–0 (Note: The friendly match against Oman was not regarded as an official match organized by FIFA because South Korea used seven substitutes in the match. Under the FIFA regulations, a maximum of six substitutes may be used in an official national team match.)	Oman	Dubai, United Arab Emirates

6 June 2010 FIFA World Cup (Qualification)	United Arab Emirates	0–2	South Korea	Dubai, United Arab Emirates
			Park Chu-young 9'; Ki Sung-yueng 39'

10 June 2010 FIFA World Cup (Qualification)	South Korea	0–0	Saudi Arabia	Seoul, South Korea

17 June 2010 FIFA World Cup (Qualification)	South Korea	1–1	Iran	Seoul, South Korea
	Park Ji-sung 81'		Shojaei 51'

12 August Friendly	South Korea	1–0	Paraguay	Seoul, South Korea
	Park Chu-young 83'

5 September Friendly	South Korea	3–1	Australia	Seoul, South Korea
	Park Chu-young 4'; Lee Jung-soo 20'; Seol Ki-hyeon 86'		Kisnorbo 33'

14 October Friendly	South Korea	2–0	Senegal	Seoul, South Korea
	Ki Sung-yueng 42'; Oh Beom-seok 80'

14 November Friendly	Denmark	0–0	South Korea	Esbjerg, Denmark

18 November Friendly	South Korea	0–1	Serbia	London, England
			Žigić 7'

== See also ==
- South Korea national football team results
- South Korea national football team
