= Football at the 1996 Summer Olympics – Men's Asian Qualifiers =

Tournament details
- Dates: 20 May 1995 – 27 March 1996
- Teams: 25 (from 1 confederation)

The Asian Football Confederation's Pre-Olympic Tournament was held from 20 May 1995 to 27 March 1996. Twenty-five teams entered the qualification for the three allocated spots for the 1996 Summer Olympics Football tournament in Atlanta.

The qualification saw Korea Republic, Japan and Saudi Arabia winning their final round groups and qualifying to the Olympics.

== Format ==
First round
25 teams were grouped into 8 groups, where each group would consist of home and away round-robin tournament. The winners of each group qualified to the second round. Most groups consisted of three teams, however one group had four teams.
Second round
8 teams were grouped into 2 groups of 4 teams each, and played a single round-robin tournament. The top two from each group qualified to the third round.
Third round
This stage was a single-elimination tournament for the last four teams. The top three teams qualified for the Olympics.

== First round ==
The first round was played in eight groups held from 20 May 1995 to 29 October 1995. The winner of each group qualified to the second round.

=== Group 1 ===
Rank	Team	Pld	W	D	L	GF	GA	GD	Pts
1	China	4	4	0	0	11	2	+9	12
2	Singapore	4	1	1	2	3	7	-4	4
3	Malaysia	4	0	1	3	1	6	-5	1

24 June 1995

Singapore	2–0	Malaysia

2 July 1995

China	4–0	Singapore

9 July 1995

China	2–1	Malaysia

16 July 1995

Malaysia	0–0	Singapore

23 July 1995

Malaysia	0–2	China

29 July 1995

Singapore	1–3	China

=== Group 2 ===
Rank	Team	Pld	W	D	L	GF	GA	GD	Pts
1	Japan	4	4	0	0	16	1	+15	12
2	Thailand	4	2	0	2	12	6	+6	6
3	Chinese Taipei	4	0	0	4	1	22	-21	0

26 May 1995

Thailand	0–5	Japan

28 May 1995

Chinese Taipei	1–4	Japan

30 May 1995

Thailand	7–0	Chinese Taipei

8 June 1995

Chinese Taipei	0–5	Thailand

11 June 1995

Japan	6–0	Chinese Taipei

14 June 1995

Japan	1–0	Thailand

=== Group 3 ===
Rank	Team	Pld	W	D	L	GF	GA	GD	Pts
1	South Korea	4	4	0	0	15	1	+14	12
2	Indonesia	4	2	0	2	6	4	+2	6
3	Hong Kong	4	0	0	4	1	17	-16	0

21 May 1995

Hong Kong	0–5	South Korea
		Woo Sung-yong 7'; Choi Yong-soo 16', 44' (pen.); Lee Ki-hyung 48'; Yoon Jong-hwan 68'

25 May 1995

Indonesia	1–2	South Korea
Nugroho 65'		Choi Yong-soo 42', 50'

30 May 1995

Indonesia	1–0	Hong Kong

19 August 1995

South Korea	7–0	Hong Kong
Park Choong-kyun 7'; Cho Hyun-doo 30'; Choi Yong-soo 16', 61', 69', 78'; Lee Woo-young 82'

22 August 1995

South Korea	1–0	Indonesia
Cho Hyun-doo 41'

26 August 1995

Hong Kong	1–4	Indonesia

=== Group 4 ===
Rank	Team	Pld	W	D	L	GF	GA	GD	Pts
1	Oman	4	4	0	0	13	3	+10	12
2	India	4	2	0	2	8	7	+1	6
3	Pakistan	4	0	0	4	2	13	-11	0

7 October 1995

Pakistan	0–2	Oman

11 October 1995

Pakistan	1–2	India
Ayub Alam 90'		Shamsi Reza 58'; Bhutia 60'

18 October 1995

Oman	3–2	India

22 October 1995

India	3–1	Pakistan
Basudeb Mondal; Ancheri (pen.); Prashanta Chakravarty		Ashfaq

25 October 1995

Oman	6–0	Pakistan

29 October 1995

India	1–2	Oman

=== Group 5 ===
Rank	Team	Pld	W	D	L	GF	GA	GD	Pts
1	Kazakhstan	6	5	1	0	19	5	+14	16
2	Uzbekistan	6	3	1	2	12	8	+4	10
3	Tajikistan	6	1	1	4	9	14	-5	4
4	Kyrgyzstan	6	1	1	4	9	22	-13	4

20 May 1995

Kyrgyzstan	1–5	Uzbekistan

20 May 1995

Tajikistan	0–3	Kazakhstan

10 June 1995

Kyrgyzstan	2–2	Kazakhstan

10 June 1995

Uzbekistan	2–0	Tajikistan

24 June 1995

Uzbekistan	1–2	Kazakhstan

24 June 1995

Tajikistan	3–0	Kyrgyzstan

12 August 1995

Uzbekistan	2–1	Kyrgyzstan

12 August 1995

Kazakhstan	3–1	Tajikistan

2 September 1995

Kazakhstan	6–0	Kyrgyzstan

2 September 1995

Tajikistan	1–1	Uzbekistan

7 October 1995

Kyrgyzstan	5–4	Tajikistan

7 October 1995

Kazakhstan	3–1	Uzbekistan

=== Group 6 ===
Rank	Team	Pld	W	D	L	GF	GA	GD	Pts
1	Saudi Arabia	4	3	1	0	4	0	+4	10
2	Kuwait	4	1	2	1	3	3	0	5
3	Syria	4	0	1	3	2	6	-4	1

24 August 1995

Saudi Arabia	2–0	Syria

31 August 1995

Kuwait	0–1	Saudi Arabia

8 September 1995

Syria	0–1	Kuwait

15 September 1995

Syria	0–1	Saudi Arabia

21 September 1995

Saudi Arabia	0–0	Kuwait

28 September 1995

Kuwait	2–2	Syria

=== Group 7 ===
Rank	Team	Pld	W	D	L	GF	GA	GD	Pts
1	United Arab Emirates	4	2	2	0	5	3	+2	8
2	Iran	4	2	1	1	9	4	+5	7
3	Turkmenistan	4	0	1	3	4	11	-7	1

13 September 1995

Turkmenistan	2–4	Iran

23 September 1995

United Arab Emirates	2–1	Turkmenistan

29 September 1995

Iran	1–1	United Arab Emirates

5 October 1995

Iran	4–0	Turkmenistan

15 October 1995

Turkmenistan	1–1	United Arab Emirates

22 October 1995

United Arab Emirates	1–0	Iran

=== Group 8 ===
Rank	Team	Pld	W	D	L	GF	GA	GD	Pts
1	Iraq	4	2	2	0	8	3	+5	8
2	Qatar	4	2	1	1	8	6	+2	7
3	Jordan	4	0	1	3	4	11	-7	1

15 September 1995

Jordan	1–2	Qatar

22 September 1995

Qatar	0–0	Iraq

29 September 1995

Jordan	0–4	Iraq
		Chathir, Fawzi; Wahaib

6 October 1995

Qatar	4–2	Jordan

13 October 1995

Iraq	3–2	Qatar
Chathir, Ali

20 October 1995

Iraq	1–1	Jordan
Ali

== Second round ==
The second and third rounds were played in Malaysia from 16 to 27 March 1996. The winners and runners-up of the second round qualified for the third round.

=== Group A ===
Rank	Team	Pld	W	D	L	GF	GA	GD	Pts
1	Japan	3	2	1	0	6	2	+4	7
2	Iraq	3	2	1	0	5	2	+3	7
3	Oman	3	1	0	2	4	6	-2	3
4	United Arab Emirates	3	0	0	3	2	7	-5	0

16 March 1996

Iraq	1–1	Japan
Wahaib 58'		Jo 27'

Shah Alam Stadium, Selangor
Referee: Pirom Un-Prasert (THA)

16 March 1996

United Arab Emirates	1–3	Oman
Saed Hassan 3'		Mohamed Al Arami 28', 65' (pen.); Habsi Ghuloom 89'

Shah Alam Stadium, Selangor
Referee: Hossein Asgari (IRN)

18 March 1996

Iraq	3–1	United Arab Emirates
Wahaib 31'; Fawzi 51'; Chathir 89'		Adel Mohamed Abdulla 10' (pen.)

Shah Alam Stadium, Selangor
Referee: Ayad Mohamad Nabil (LBN)

18 March 1996

Japan	4–1	Oman
Maezono 19' (pen.), 39'; Jo 57'; Nakata 58'		Dhahi Al Mukhaini 19' (pen.)

Shah Alam Stadium, Selangor
Referee: Said Belqola (MAR)

20 March 1996

Japan	1–0	United Arab Emirates
Uemura 23'

Shah Alam Stadium, Selangor
Referee: Manie Saadie (KUW)

20 March 1996

Iraq	1–0	Oman
Chathir 62'

Shah Alam Stadium, Selangor
Referee: Sidi Magassa (MLI)

=== Group B ===
Rank	Team	Pld	W	D	L	GF	GA	GD	Pts
1	South Korea	3	2	1	0	6	2	+4	7
2	Saudi Arabia	3	1	2	0	6	2	+4	5
3	China	3	1	1	1	5	6	-1	4
4	Kazakhstan	3	0	0	3	3	10	-7	0

17 March 1996

Kazakhstan	2–4	China
Niyazimbetov 33'; Yablochkin 21'		Yao Xie 45', 50'; Genwei Yu 81'; Weijun Peng 88' (pen.)

Shah Alam Stadium, Selangor
Referee: Saad Mane (KUW)

17 March 1996

South Korea	1–1	Saudi Arabia
Yoon Jong-hwan 21'		Al-Dossary 39'

Shah Alam Stadium, Selangor
Referee: Pirom Un-Prasert (THA)

19 March 1996

Kazakhstan	1–2	South Korea
Grokhovskiy 2'		Lee Ki-hyung 59'; Woo Sung-yong 89'

Shah Alam Stadium, Selangor
Referee: Jamal Al-Sharif (SYR)

19 March 1996

China	1–1	Saudi Arabia
Tan Ende 75'		Al-Dossary 53'

Shah Alam Stadium, Selangor
Referee: Mohamed Abdullah (MAS)

21 March 1996

China	0–3	South Korea
		Lee Ki-hyung 36'; Lee Woo-young 57', 67'

Shah Alam Stadium, Selangor
Referee: Said Belqola (MAR)

21 March 1996

Kazakhstan	0–4	Saudi Arabia
		Ibrahim Bin Isa 2'; Al Dosari 36', 56', 64'

Shah Alam Stadium, Selangor
Referee: Hossein Asgari (IRN)

== Third round ==
The winners of both semi-finals qualified for the 1996 Olympic Games in Atlanta.

=== Semifinals ===
24 March 1996

Japan	2–1	Saudi Arabia
Maezono 4', 58'		Al Dosari 77'

Shah Alam Stadium, Selangor
Referee: Mohd Nazri Abdullah (MAS)

24 March 1996

South Korea	2–1	Iraq
Choi Yong-soo 19', 30'		Essam Salem 89'

Shah Alam Stadium, Selangor
Referee: Pirom Un-Prasert (THA)

=== Third place play-off ===
The winners of the third place play-off qualified for the 1996 Olympic Games in Atlanta.

27 March 1996

Saudi Arabia	1–0 (a.e.t./g.g.)	Iraq
Hussain Sulaimani 97'

Shah Alam Stadium, Selangor
Referee: Said Belqola (MAR)

=== Final ===
27 March 1996

South Korea	2–1	Japan
Lee Sang-hun 79'; Choi Yong-soo 82' (pen.)		Jo 81'

Shah Alam Stadium, Selangor
Referee: Jamal Al-Sharif (SYR)
