= Na Seung-hwa =

South Korean footballer (born 1969)

Personal information
- Date of birth: 8 October 1969 (age 57)
- Position: Defender

International career
Years	Team	Apps	(Gls)
- South Korea

Na Seung-hwa (born 8 October 1969) is a South Korean former footballer. He competed in the men's tournament at the 1992 Summer Olympics.
