= Gwak Kyung-keun =

South Korean footballer

Gwak Kyung-Keun 곽경근
Personal information
- Full name: Gwak Kyung-Keun
- Date of birth: October 10, 1972 (age 54)
- Place of birth: Bucheon, Gyeonggi, South Korea
- Height: 1.84 m (6 ft 0 in)
- Position: Forward

Team information
- Current team: Bucheon FC 1995

Youth career
- 1988–1990: Bupyeong High School
- 1991–1994: Korea University

Senior career*
Years	Team	Apps	(Gls)
1995	Urawa Reds	0	(0)
1995–1997	Fukushima FC	47	(13)
1998–2002	Bucheon SK	111	(24)
2003–2004	Busan I'Cons	49	(0)

International career^{‡}
1991–1992	South Korea U-23	27	(6)
1998–2000	South Korea	7	(0)

Managerial career
- 2005–2011: Yeoido High School
- 2012–2013: Bucheon FC 1995
- * Club domestic league appearances and goals as of 15 January 2008 ‡ National team caps and goals as of 15 January 2008

- Gwak Kyung-keun
- Hangul: 곽경근
- Hanja: 郭慶根
- RR: Gwak Gyeonggeun
- MR: Kwak Kyŏnggŭn

Gwak Kyung-Keun (Korean: 곽경근; born October 10, 1972) is a South Korean football player who plays at the forward position.

When he transferred to Busan I'cons, he changed his position to defender.

He is now the manager of Bucheon FC 1995 in K League.
