= Cho Hyun-doo =

South Korean footballer (born 1973)

Cho Hyun-Doo 조현두
Personal information
- Full name: Cho Hyun-Doo
- Date of birth: November 23, 1973 (age 52)
- Place of birth: South Korea
- Height: 1.77 m (5 ft 9 1/2 in)
- Position: Forward

Team information
- Current team: Suwon Samsung Bluewings U-18

Youth career
- 1992–1995: Hanyang University

Senior career*
Years	Team	Apps	(Gls)
1996–2002	Suwon Samsung Bluewings	135	(20)
2003	Chunnam Dragons	3	(0)
2003–2005	Bucheon SK	69	(8)
2006–2007	Gangneung City	0	(9)
2009–2010	Yongin FC		

International career^{‡}
1993	South Korea U-20		
1995–1996	South Korea U-23	22	(4)
1997	South Korea	3	(0)

Managerial career
- 2007–2009: Suwon Samsung Bluewings U-12 (coach)
- 2010–2011: Suwon Samsung Bluewings U-15
- 2012–present: Suwon Samsung Bluewings U-18
- * Club domestic league appearances and goals as of 31 January 2009 ‡ National team caps and goals as of 18 June 2007

- Cho Hyun-doo
- Hangul: 조현두
- Hanja: 趙顯斗
- RR: Jo Hyeondu
- MR: Cho Hyŏndu

Cho Hyun-doo (Korean: 조현두; born November 23, 1973) is a football player from South Korea. He is currently coaching Suwon Samsung Bluewings youth system.

He was a member of the South Korean Youth (U-20) team in early 1990s and went on to play as a professional in the K-League.

He also made three appearances for the South Korea national team, including a match versus New Zealand in 1997.

== Club career ==
- 1996-2002 Suwon Samsung Bluewings
- 2003 Chunnam Dragons
- 2003-2005 Bucheon SK
- 2006-2007 Gangneung City
- 2009–2010 Yongin Citizen
