= Park Dong-hyuk =

South Korean footballer (born 1979)

Park Dong-Hyuk 박동혁
Personal information
- Full name: Park Dong-Hyuk
- Date of birth: 18 April 1979 (age 47)
- Place of birth: Seoul, South Korea
- Height: 1.85 m (6 ft 1 in)
- Position: Centre back

Team information
- Current team: Jeonnam Dragons (manager)

Youth career
- 1998–2001: Korea University

Senior career*
Years	Team	Apps	(Gls)
2002–2005	Jeonbuk Hyundai Motors	74	(5)
2006–2008	Ulsan Hyundai	68	(6)
2009	Gamba Osaka	9	(1)
2009	→ Kashiwa Reysol (loan)	14	(0)
2009–2011	Kashiwa Reysol	57	(6)
2012	Dalian Shide	25	(3)
2013–2014	Ulsan Hyundai	40	(1)

International career^{‡}
1998–1999	South Korea U-20	8	(0)
1999–2002	South Korea U-23	32	(5)
1998–2005	South Korea	18	(0)

Managerial career
- 2018–2019: Asan Mugunghwa
- 2020–2023: Chungnam Asan
- 2023–2024: Gyeongnam FC
- 2025–: Jeonnam Dragons
Medal record
Representing South Korea
Men's football
Asian Games
Bronze medal – third place	2002 Busan	Team
- * Club domestic league appearances and goals as of 5 December 2023 ‡ National team caps and goals as of 22 January 2009

- Park Dong-hyuk
- Hangul: 박동혁
- Hanja: 朴東赫
- RR: Bak Donghyeok
- MR: Pak Tonghyŏk

Park Dong-Hyuk (born 18 April 1979) is a South Korean football manager and former player who is the current manager of K League 2 club Jeonnam Dragons. He last played for K League Classic club Ulsan Hyundai. His previous clubs were Jeonbuk Hyundai Motors, Gamba Osaka, Kashiwa Reysol and Dalian Shide. He was a part of South Korea, who appeared at the Summer Olympic Games in 2000.

On 16 December 2011, Park signed a contract with Chinese Super League club Dalian Shide.

On 21 November 2023, he left Chungnam Asan FC through a mutual consent. On 5 December 2023, he got appointed as the 9th manager of Gyeongnam FC.

== Club statistics ==
Club performance			League		Cup		League Cup		Continental		Total	
Season	Club	League	Apps	Goals	Apps	Goals	Apps	Goals	Apps	Goals	Apps	Goals
South Korea			League		KFA Cup		League Cup		Asia		Total	
2002	Jeonbuk Hyundai Motors	K-League	13	2	?	?	8	0	?	?		
2003	Jeonbuk Hyundai Motors	K-League	31	1	3	0	-		-		34	1
2004	Jeonbuk Hyundai Motors	K-League	13	0	1	0	9	4	?	1		
2005	Jeonbuk Hyundai Motors	K-League	17	2	4	0	10	3	-		31	5
2006	Ulsan Hyundai Horang-i	K-League	21	4	1	0	13	0	?	?		
2007	Ulsan Hyundai Horang-i	K-League	24	2	3	0	8	2	-		35	4
2008	Ulsan Hyundai Horang-i	K-League	28	1	2	1	9	0	-		39	2
Japan			League		Emperor's Cup		League Cup		Asia		Total	
2009	Gamba Osaka	J1 League	9	1	-		-		3	0	12	1
2009	Kashiwa Reysol	J1 League	14	0	1	0	-		-		15	0
2010	Kashiwa Reysol	J2 League	34	4	3	0	-		-		37	4
2011	Kashiwa Reysol	J1 League	17	2			1	0	-		18	2
China PR			League		FA Cup		CSL Cup		Asia		Total	
2012	Dalian Shide	Chinese Super League					-		-			
Total	South Korea		147	12	14	1	57	9				
Total	Japan		74	7	4	0	1	0	3	0	82	7
Career total			221	19			58	9	?	1		

== Honors ==
=== Club ===
Jeonbuk Hyundai Motors

- Korean FA Cup – 2003, 2005
- Korean Super Cup – 2004

Ulsan Hyundai

- A3 Champions Cup – 2006
- Hauzen Cup – 2007
- Korean Super Cup – 2006

=== Individual ===
- K-League Best XI – 2008
