= Igor Grokhovskiy =

Kazakhstani footballer

Personal information
- Full name: Igor Valentinovich Grokhovskiy
- Date of birth: June 30, 1973
- Date of death: February 2005 (aged 31)
- Place of death: Samara, Russia
- Height: 1.81 m (5 ft 11 1/2 in)
- Position: Forward

Youth career
- Kazakh Republican Academy Alma-Ata

Senior career*
Years	Team	Apps	(Gls)
1991	FC Olimpia Alma-Ata	7	(1)
1991	FC Tselinnik Tselinograd	5	(0)
1992	FC Arman	31	(19)
1993	FC Dinamo Alma-Ata	36	(20)
1994	FC Dynamo Moscow	0	(0)
1994	→ FC Dynamo-d Moscow (loan)	8	(4)
1994	FC Lokomotiv Nizhny Novgorod	1	(0)
1995–1996	FC Arsenal Tula	43	(12)
1998–1999	FC Arsenal Tula	14	(1)
1998–1999	→ FC Arsenal-2 Tula (loans)	38	(18)
- * Club domestic league appearances and goals

Igor Valentinovich Grokhovskiy (Russian: Игорь Валентинович Гроховский; 30 June 1973 – February 2005) was a Kazakhstani football player.
