= Lee Young-pyo =

South Korean football commentator and former player (born 1977)

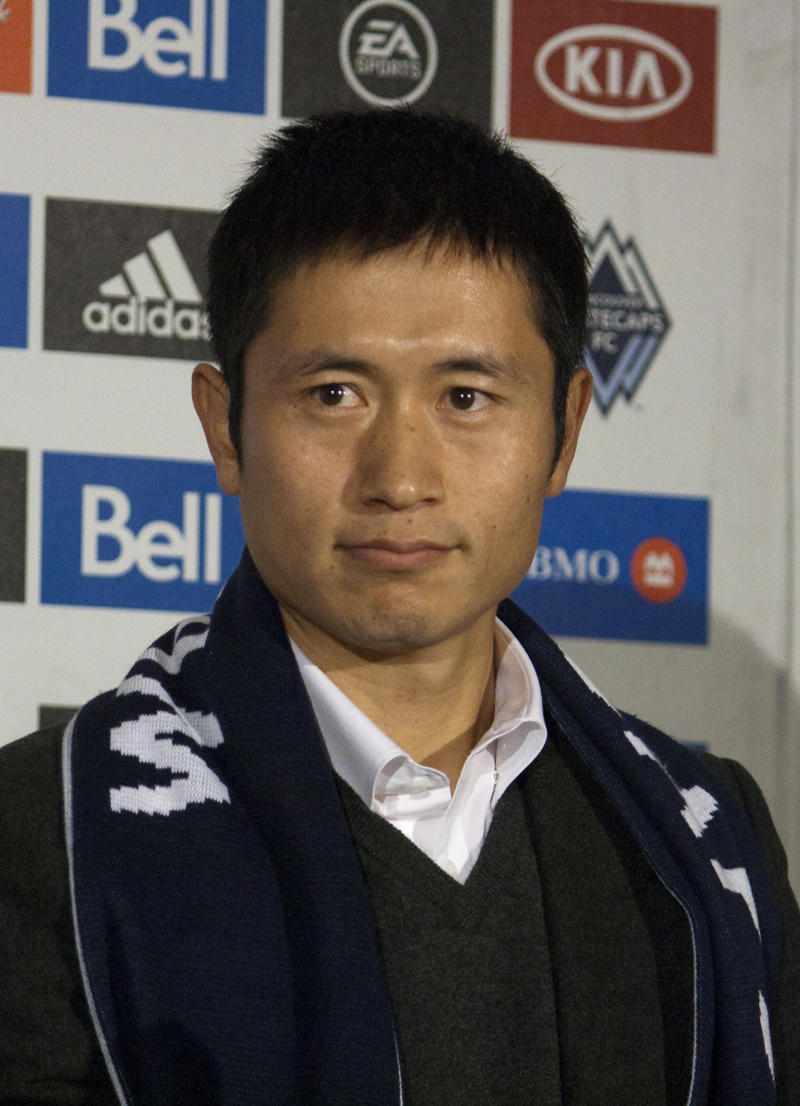
- Lee with Vancouver Whitecaps FC in 2011

Personal information
- Full name: Lee Young-pyo
- Date of birth: 23 April 1977 (age 49)
- Place of birth: Hongcheon, Gangwon, South Korea
- Height: 1.76 m (5 ft 9 in)
- Position: Left-back

Youth career
- 1990–1992: Anyang Middle School
- 1993–1995: Anyang Technical High School

College career
Years	Team	Apps	(Gls)
1996–1999	Konkuk University		

Senior career*
Years	Team	Apps	(Gls)
2000–2002	Anyang LG Cheetahs	60	(3)
2003–2005	PSV Eindhoven	81	(1)
2005–2008	Tottenham Hotspur	70	(0)
2008–2009	Borussia Dortmund	18	(0)
2009–2011	Al-Hilal	46	(0)
2011–2013	Vancouver Whitecaps FC	65	(1)
Total		340	(5)

International career
1999–2002	South Korea U23	23 (Note: Includes nine appearances as an overage player (six appearances in Asian Games, three appearances in friendlies).)	(2)
1999–2011	South Korea	127	(5)
Medal record
Representing South Korea
Men's football
AFC Asian Cup
Bronze medal – third place	2000 Lebanon	Team
Bronze medal – third place	2011 Qatar	Team
Asian Games
Bronze medal – third place	2002 Busan	Team
- * Club domestic league appearances and goals

- Lee Young-pyo
- Hangul: 이영표
- Hanja: 李榮杓
- RR: I Yeongpyo
- MR: I Yŏngp'yo
- IPA: [i.jʌŋ.pʰjo]

Lee Young-pyo (Korean: 이영표; born 23 April 1977) is a South Korean football commentator, administrator and former professional footballer. Primarily a left-back or wing-back, he was known for his pace, stamina, intelligent positioning and step overs. Although right-footed, he also played at right-back and as a defensive midfielder.

Lee began his professional career with Anyang LG Cheetahs, winning the 2000 K League and being selected for the 2001 K League Best XI. He joined PSV Eindhoven under former South Korea manager Guus Hiddink in 2003, winning two Eredivisie titles and the 2004–05 KNVB Cup and helping PSV reach the semi-finals of the 2004–05 UEFA Champions League. He moved to Tottenham Hotspur in 2005 and later played for Borussia Dortmund, Al-Hilal and Vancouver Whitecaps FC, retiring in 2013. He was part of Tottenham's 2007–08 Football League Cup-winning squad, won two Saudi Pro League titles with Al-Hilal and was voted Vancouver's Player of the Year in 2012.

Between 1999 and 2011, Lee earned 127 caps and scored five goals for the South Korea national team. He appeared at three FIFA World Cups and helped South Korea finish fourth as co-hosts in 2002, providing the assists for the winning goals against Portugal in the group stage and Italy in the round of 16. He also helped South Korea finish third at the 2000 and 2011 AFC Asian Cups.

After retiring as a player, Lee became a football commentator for KBS, with his forecasts during the 2014 FIFA World Cup earning him the nickname "Octopus Young-pyo". He was chief executive of Gangwon FC from 2021 to 2022 and as a vice-president of the Korea Football Association from 2021 to 2023, and was appointed an outside director of Ulsan HD FC in 2026.

== Early life ==
Lee was born on 23 April 1977 in Changchon-ri, Nae-myeon, Hongcheon, Gangwon Province. He attended Changchon Elementary School through the second grade before his family moved to Anyang in 1985. At Anyang Elementary School, Lee competed in athletics and placed eighth in a Gyeonggi Province elementary short-distance marathon while in the third grade. The following year, a football coach who had noticed his speed invited him to join the school team. Lee later recalled choosing football because he preferred the prospect of playing a team sport to running alone.

Lee continued his education at Anyang Middle School and Anyang Technical High School, playing as a striker throughout his school career. In July 1995, as a third-year student, he scored his team's second goal in Anyang Technical High's 2–0 victory over Jaehyun High School in the final of the 14th KBS Cup autumn high-school tournament and was named the tournament's most valuable player. The following month, he helped Anyang Technical High win the Baengnokgi national high-school tournament. Shortly before entering university, Lee suffered a serious knee injury and consequently did not represent South Korea at under-20 or younger levels.

Lee entered Konkuk University in 1996, where he studied political science and played for the university football team for four years. Although he had previously played as a striker, Konkuk coach Jeong Jong-deok converted him to left wing-back, believing that the position would make the best use of his dribbling ability. Lee remained in the position throughout his four years at Konkuk.

== Club career ==
=== Anyang LG Cheetahs ===
On 3 December 1999, Anyang LG Cheetahs selected Lee, then at Konkuk University, with the first overall pick of the 2000 K League draft. Manager Cho Kwang-rae initially restricted him to the left flank but later used him as an attack-minded wing-back, allowing him to move into central midfield and forward areas. His frequent national-team commitments limited him to 18 domestic appearances. He nevertheless scored twice, registering his first professional goal in a 2–1 victory over Daejeon Citizen on 5 July and the winning goal against Bucheon SK seven days later. Lee appeared in both matches of the championship series against Bucheon as Anyang claimed its first league title in ten years. He finished runner-up to Yang Hyun-jung for the K League Rookie of the Year award.

In 2001, Lee made 22 league appearances as the defending champions finished second, two points behind Seongnam Ilhwa Chunma. He was subsequently selected as a defender in the K League Best XI. After a national-team training camp ended, Lee flew to Tehran in April 2002 and played every minute of Anyang’s semi-final and final in the 2001–02 Asian Club Championship. Anyang defeated hosts Esteghlal 2–1 in the semi-final, but played most of the final with ten men following André’s first-half dismissal and lost 4–2 on penalties to Suwon Samsung Bluewings after a goalless draw.

After returning from the 2002 FIFA World Cup, Lee recorded one goal and five assists in 23 league appearances as Anyang finished fourth in 2002. During a league match at Bucheon on 21 July, Lee was involved in a late altercation with veteran defender Lee Lim-saeng, who struck him after believing that Lee had deliberately stepped on him during a challenge. Lee bowed in apology on the field, while Lim subsequently accepted full responsibility and apologised by telephone; although footage of the incident circulated widely, Lee said in 2019 that the two had remained close and described the episode as widely misunderstood.

Following the 2002 season, PSV Eindhoven head coach and former South Korea manager Guus Hiddink contacted Lee about joining the Dutch club. Lee later recalled that, before PSV's approach, he had not received an offer from a European club and had rejected one from an unnamed J.League club because he feared that moving to Japan would end his hopes of playing in Europe. On 8 January 2003, Anyang announced an agreement to loan Lee to PSV for six months for a reported US$300,000, with a US$1.7 million fee if PSV made the transfer permanent.

=== PSV Eindhoven ===
Lee made his Eredivisie debut for PSV on 15 February 2003, coming on at half-time and playing at left-back in a 6–0 home victory over FC Zwolle. He started each of PSV's remaining 14 league matches that season. On his 26th birthday, 23 April, PSV announced that his six-month loan would become a permanent three-year contract beginning on 1 July. PSV clinched the 2002–03 Eredivisie title on the final day of the season, making Lee and Park Ji-sung the first South Korean footballers to win a European top-flight league title.

Lee remained PSV's first-choice left-back during the 2003–04 season, starting 32 of the club's 34 league matches. PSV opened the season by defeating FC Utrecht 3–1 in the 2003 Johan Cruyff Shield and later reached the 2003–04 UEFA Cup quarter-finals, where they were eliminated 3–2 on aggregate by Newcastle United.

Lee's most productive PSV season came in 2004–05. On 24 October 2004, he scored his only goal for the club to open a 2–0 victory over Ajax, before crossing for John de Jong to head in the second goal. He recorded one goal and ten assists in 31 league appearances, completing every minute of each of those matches. In April 2005, Voetbal International wrote that Lee covered the entire left flank and was second only to Mark van Bommel in assists for PSV at that point, referring to him as the Eredivisie's best left-back that season. Lee played the full match as PSV defeated Willem II 4–0 in the 2005 KNVB Cup final, completing the club's first league-and-cup double in 16 seasons.

Lee also appeared in all 14 of PSV's Champions League matches, including qualifying. PSV advanced beyond the Champions League group stage for the first time and ultimately reached the semi-finals, where Lee and Park became the first South Korean players to appear at that stage of the competition. In the second leg of the semi-final against AC Milan, Hiddink switched to a three-man defence and pushed Lee farther forward on the left. Lee reached the byline and crossed for Phillip Cocu to put PSV 2–0 ahead on the night and level the tie on aggregate. PSV eventually won 3–1, but Massimo Ambrosini's stoppage-time away goal sent Milan through on the away-goals rule with the aggregate score tied at 3–3.

In July 2005, Monaco entered negotiations to sign Lee, but its reported €2 million offer fell short of PSV's €5 million valuation. Hiddink also said that leaving PSV would benefit Lee only if he joined a leading club in one of Europe's major leagues, effectively opposing the Monaco move. In a 2025 interview, Lee recalled receiving approaches from six clubs: Tottenham Hotspur, Monaco, Porto, Manchester City, Newcastle United and West Ham United. He said Monaco offered him nearly twice Tottenham's salary and that manager Didier Deschamps telephoned to explain his plans for Lee, but Lee preferred Tottenham because he wanted to test himself in the Premier League.

PSV and Hiddink initially sought to keep Lee when Tottenham pursued him. Lee later recalled telling Hiddink that, although he did not want to lose the opportunity, he would remain and continue giving his best if Hiddink wanted him to stay. Hiddink responded by offering him PSV's maximum contract terms, but two days before the transfer window closed, he embraced Lee and told him simply, "Go." Lee completed his transfer to Tottenham on 31 August 2005. In an interview shortly afterward, he said the move would have been impossible without Hiddink's decision and thanked the manager for ultimately helping him leave.

=== Tottenham Hotspur ===
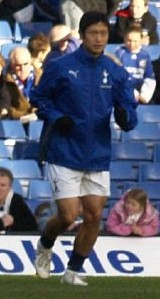
Lee playing for Tottenham Hotspur in 2008

Lee completed his transfer from PSV to Tottenham Hotspur on 31 August 2005, becoming the first South Korean to represent the club. He made his Premier League debut on 10 September, playing the full match at left-back in a 0–0 draw with Liverpool. During the first half, he used his characteristic stepovers to beat Steve Finnan and win a corner. Lee established himself as Tottenham's first-choice left-back, starting 31 league matches in his first season as the club finished fifth and qualified for the UEFA Cup.

On 22 October 2005, Lee and Park Ji-sung became the first pair of South Korean players to face one another in the Premier League, appearing for Tottenham and Manchester United respectively in a 1–1 draw. In the return fixture on 17 April 2006, Park dispossessed Lee inside the Tottenham penalty area and supplied Wayne Rooney for the decisive goal in United's 2–1 victory. A photograph showing Park reaching back to clasp Lee's hand immediately after the goal attracted widespread attention in South Korea.

In August 2006, Lee came close to joining Roma, but withdrew from the proposed transfer shortly before it was to be completed. He said that although footballing considerations favoured Roma, he believed remaining in England was better for his life and future; he denied reports that religious or family considerations had caused the decision. On 4 March 2007, his stoppage-time tackle on Bobby Zamora began the counterattack from which Paul Stalteri scored the winning goal in Tottenham's 4–3 victory over West Ham United. The following month, however, Lee tore the lateral ligament in his left knee during a UEFA Cup match against Sevilla. He underwent surgery and missed the remainder of the season.

After recovering, Lee made 30 appearances in all competitions during the 2007–08 season. He appeared four times in Tottenham's victorious League Cup campaign and received a winner's medal, although he was not selected for the final against Chelsea. On 27 August 2008, he left Tottenham to join Borussia Dortmund permanently. Lee made 93 appearances for Tottenham, including 70 in the Premier League, without scoring.

=== Borussia Dortmund ===
On 27 August 2008, Lee joined Borussia Dortmund from Tottenham on a one-year contract lasting until 30 June 2009, with the transfer fee undisclosed. Manager Jürgen Klopp recruited him after the club's established left-back, Dedê, suffered an anterior cruciate ligament injury that was expected to sideline him for six months.

Lee made his competitive debut on 13 September, starting at left-back in a 3–3 Revierderby draw with Schalke 04. He became a regular and was used on both sides of the defence, making 22 competitive appearances—18 in the Bundesliga and two each in the DFB-Pokal and UEFA Cup.

In December 2008, Dortmund announced that it had reached an agreement with Lee to extend his contract through at least June 2010, praising his performances during the first half of the season. The proposed extension was never formalised; sporting director Michael Zorc later described the announcement as a declaration of intent that had not been executed. After Dedê returned, Lee was initially moved to right-back but subsequently lost his place, making his final Dortmund appearance on 4 April 2009.

=== Al-Hilal ===
In July 2009, after his Dortmund contract expired, Lee signed a one-year contract with Saudi Arabian club Al-Hilal that included an option for a second season. Lee chose the club partly because he expected more regular playing time, and reached the decision after consulting Seol Ki-hyeon, who had recently spent six months on loan at Al-Hilal.

Lee made his league debut on 19 August, playing the full match in a 2–1 victory at Al-Qadisiyah. Although principally a left-back earlier in his career, he was generally deployed at right-back by Al-Hilal. He appeared in all 22 league matches and all four matches of Al-Hilal's successful Saudi Crown Prince Cup campaign as the club completed a domestic double in 2009–10.

On 30 March 2010, Lee scored his only goal for Al-Hilal, converting in stoppage time to secure a 3–2 away victory over the United Arab Emirates' Al-Ahli in the 2010 AFC Champions League group stage. His performances earned him a one-year contract extension through June 2011. Al-Hilal subsequently reached the Champions League semi-finals, but lost both legs 1–0 to Iran's Zob Ahan. Lee was sent off in the 71st minute of the second leg after kicking an opponent.

Lee appeared in 24 of Al-Hilal's 26 league matches during the 2010–11 season. The club retained both the league and Crown Prince Cup, completing the league season unbeaten with 19 victories and seven draws. Lee played the full match in the 5–0 Crown Prince Cup final victory over Al-Wehda. Al-Hilal offered Lee another extension following the season, but he declined and left when his contract expired in June 2011, having made 46 league appearances over his two seasons.

=== Vancouver Whitecaps FC ===
On 6 December 2011, Vancouver Whitecaps FC announced Lee's signing as a free agent. His contract covered the 2012 season and included an option for a second year. Lee said that he chose Vancouver over more lucrative offers because he prioritised his family's future and wanted to experience a new culture while his daughters learned English. Although he had usually played at left-back, head coach Martin Rennie recruited him to fill the vacancy at right-back, with Alain Rochat established on the left.

Lee made his Major League Soccer (MLS) debut on 10 March 2012, starting in a 2–0 home victory over expansion club Montreal Impact. His only MLS goal came on 28 April, when a 74th-minute free kick from the right flank that he had intended as a cross gave Vancouver a 1–0 away victory over the Columbus Crew. He started and completed all 33 of his regular-season appearances, missing only one match and recording four assists. Whitecaps supporters voted him the club's 2012 Player of the Year. Vancouver became the first Canadian club to qualify for the MLS Cup playoffs, and Lee started their first playoff match, a 2–1 knockout-round defeat to defending champions LA Galaxy on 1 November.

After considering retirement, Lee agreed to return when Vancouver took up the option for 2013. He made 32 regular-season appearances, including 30 starts, and recorded six assists. One of those was the cross for Camilo Sanvezzo's scissor-kick equaliser in a 2–2 draw with the Portland Timbers on 6 October, which was later voted the 2013 MLS Goal of the Year. The Whitecaps won the Cascadia Cup for the first time since entering MLS, but did not return to the league playoffs.

On 22 October, Vancouver confirmed that Lee would retire at the end of the season. Five days later, he captained the Whitecaps in his final professional match, a 3–0 home victory over the Colorado Rapids before a sold-out crowd of 21,000. Camilo, who was pursuing the MLS Golden Boot, offered Lee a first-half penalty; Lee declined, and after converting it Camilo knelt and presented him with the ball. Lee was substituted in stoppage time to a standing ovation, and his teammates lifted him at midfield after the match. At a retirement press conference in Seoul on 14 November, Lee said that he had prepared for retirement for five or six years and chose to stop when he began noticing a decline in his stamina, before it became apparent to his teammates and coaches. The following day, the Korea Football Association held an official retirement ceremony titled "Adieu No. 12" at half-time of South Korea's friendly against Switzerland at Seoul World Cup Stadium, where supporters launched about 20,000 paper aeroplanes carrying farewell messages. Across his two seasons in Vancouver, Lee started 63 of 65 MLS regular-season matches, scoring once and recording ten assists.

== International career ==
=== 2000 Summer Olympics ===
Lee was selected for the South Korean Olympic team in April 1999 despite having no previous youth-international experience. He scored on his under-23 debut, a 5–0 Olympic qualifying victory over Sri Lanka on 25 May, and scored again in a 7–0 win against Chinese Taipei two days later. At the 2000 Summer Olympics, Lee started all three group matches. South Korea lost 3–0 to Spain before defeating Morocco and Chile 1–0; all three teams finished with six points, but South Korea placed third on goal difference and were eliminated.

=== 2002 World Cup ===
Lee made his senior international debut on 12 June 1999, in a 1–1 draw with Mexico at the Korea Cup, and scored his first senior goal in a 1–0 friendly victory over China on 28 July 2000. Later that year, he played in all six of South Korea's matches at the 2000 AFC Asian Cup, scoring the opening goal in a 2–2 group-stage draw with China as the team finished third. Lee also appeared in all three of South Korea's matches at the 2001 FIFA Confederations Cup and represented invited South Korean sides at the 2000 and 2002 CONCACAF Gold Cups.

Under manager Guus Hiddink, Lee was frequently used as a defensive midfielder during 2001 and early 2002 before returning to the left wing-back position in the months preceding the World Cup.

On 1 June 2002, shortly before South Korea's World Cup opener, Lee tore a muscle in his left calf after colliding with Cha Du-ri during training. He missed the first two group matches, against Poland and the United States, before returning to start against Portugal. His cross from the left was controlled by Park Ji-sung, who scored the only goal of the match to send South Korea into the knockout stage as group winners. In the round of 16 against Italy, Ahn Jung-hwan headed another Lee cross into the net in the 117th minute for a 2–1 golden goal victory. Lee appeared in all five of South Korea's remaining matches as the co-hosts finished fourth.

=== 2002 Asian Games ===
Lee returned as one of South Korea under-23s' three over-age players, alongside Lee Woon-jae and Kim Young-chul, for the 2002 Asian Games, appearing in all six matches. In the semi-final, South Korea drew 0–0 with Iran after extra time. Lee, the team captain, struck the crossbar with South Korea's only missed penalty, while Iran converted all five attempts to win the shootout 5–3. South Korea subsequently defeated Thailand 3–0 to win the bronze medal.

The defeat meant that teammates who had not already qualified for South Korea's special military-service status for athletes, including Lee Dong-gook, did not receive the benefit available to Asian Games gold medallists. Lee had already qualified under the special rule introduced for members of South Korea's 2002 FIFA World Cup team. He later recalled apologising to Lee Dong-gook, who told him that he did not blame him for the miss.

=== 2006 World Cup ===
Lee played every minute of South Korea's four matches at the 2004 AFC Asian Cup, where they won their group before losing 4–3 to Iran in the quarter-finals. During qualification for the 2006 FIFA World Cup, he scored in victories over Kuwait and Uzbekistan in 2005; these were his final two senior international goals.

At the 2006 World Cup, Lee started all three of South Korea's group matches. He played as a left wing-back in the 2–1 victory over Togo, but moved to right-back for the following match against France when Kim Dong-jin returned from suspension to occupy the left side. Lee was again used on the right against Switzerland. South Korea collected four points but finished third in their group and were eliminated.

=== 2010 World Cup ===
A torn lateral ligament in Lee's left knee, sustained while playing for Tottenham Hotspur in April 2007, required surgery and ruled him out of the 2007 AFC Asian Cup. On 19 November 2008, he became the seventh South Korean to earn 100 senior caps, making two early goal-line clearances in a 2–0 World Cup qualifying victory away to Saudi Arabia.

Lee started all four of South Korea's matches at the 2010 FIFA World Cup. In their opening 2–0 victory over Greece, Giourkas Seitaridis fouled him near the corner flag; Ki Sung-yueng delivered the resulting free kick for Lee Jung-soo's seventh-minute opening goal. The sequence was repeated in the 2–2 draw with Nigeria, when Chinedu Obasi fouled Lee before another Ki free kick was converted by Lee Jung-soo. South Korea advanced to the round of 16, where they lost 2–1 to Uruguay.

At the 2011 AFC Asian Cup, Lee played every minute of South Korea's six matches as the team finished third. His 127th and final senior appearance was the 3–2 third-place play-off victory over Uzbekistan on 28 January, after which he retired from international football. It was his 16th Asian Cup appearance, then a South Korean record, and he finished his senior international career with five goals in 127 matches.

== Style of play ==
A right-footed full-back used primarily on the left, Lee could also operate at right-back or as a defensive midfielder. His dominant foot was a recurring consideration when he played on the left. A 2006 assessment of his first Tottenham season praised his passing, pace and recovery runs but identified crossing with his weaker left foot as his principal technical limitation, observing that those deliveries lacked the height and power of his right-footed kicks. Tottenham sometimes moved him to his natural side; when he started the 2006–07 season at right-back to accommodate Benoît Assou-Ekotto on the left, the club said that the arrangement could give the team greater balance because Lee was right-footed. He later played predominantly at right-back for Al-Hilal and Vancouver Whitecaps.

Although his relatively slight build could leave him at a physical disadvantage, Lee compensated with speed, stamina, intelligent positioning and efficient defending. His work rate and movement allowed him to contribute on both sides of the ball, regularly advancing from full-back to support attacks.

Lee was particularly associated with his dribbling and repeated step overs. He developed the move after repeatedly watching footage of Diego Maradona as a child and practising Maradona's dribbling techniques. Early in his senior career, a contemporary profile identified his kicking power and crossing as areas requiring improvement and noted occasional errors in his delivery. He nevertheless supplied important crosses during his career; in the second leg of PSV Eindhoven's 2004–05 UEFA Champions League semi-final against AC Milan, his stepovers featured in PSV's attacking play before he crossed for Phillip Cocu to score.

== After retirement ==
=== Broadcasting ===
Following his retirement, Lee signed a five-year exclusive contract as a football commentator with KBS in January 2014, covering major tournaments through the 2018 FIFA World Cup. He made his commentary debut later that month during South Korea's friendly against Mexico.

During the 2014 FIFA World Cup, Lee attracted attention for several forecasts that proved correct. He anticipated the Netherlands' victory over defending champions Spain and correctly predicted 2–1 victories for Ivory Coast over Japan and Italy over England. The forecasts earned him the nickname "Octopus Young-pyo" (문어 영표), after Paul the Octopus, which had become famous for apparently predicting results at the 2010 World Cup. Lee rejected descriptions of the forecasts as prophecy, explaining that anticipating possible developments was part of a commentator's work and acknowledging that many of his predictions had also been incorrect. His analysis attracted press attention, while KBS's broadcast of South Korea's match against Russia led the country's three terrestrial networks in audience ratings.

Following South Korea's group-stage elimination, manager Hong Myung-bo said that the players had gained valuable experience from the tournament. Lee responded that the World Cup was "not a place to gain experience" but "a place to prove yourself". Although he described the campaign as a failure because South Korea had not reached the round of 16, he said that responsibility extended beyond the players to Korean football as a whole.

Lee continued as a KBS commentator through the 2018 World Cup, during which the network led the terrestrial television ratings for each of South Korea's three group matches. After five years away from the network, he resumed commentary for KBS in May 2023. He returned to World Cup commentary as part of KBS's main broadcasting team for the 2026 FIFA World Cup, eight years after his previous World Cup assignment.

=== Sport administration ===
In March 2016, Lee returned to Vancouver Whitecaps FC as a club ambassador, representing the club at community, commercial-partner and promotional events. In April 2018, he was appointed to the K League Development Committee, an external advisory panel formed to consider league regulations, marketing, youth development and standards of play.

In February 2019, Lee was appointed one of 15 civilian members of the Ministry of Culture, Sports and Tourism's public–private Sports Innovation Committee, which was charged with developing structural reforms for South Korean sport and monitoring their implementation. In July, he presented the committee's fifth recommendation, which called for expanding community sports clubs to link elite, school and recreational sport. In April 2020, the ministry also appointed Lee to the five-member preparatory committee for the Sports Ethics Center, which was responsible for establishing the new body's rules, organisational structure and staffing before its launch.

By July 2020, Lee was a director of the KFA Football Love Sharing Foundation, the Korea Football Association's charitable foundation. He represented the foundation at the launch of K League Dream Assist, a one-to-one mentoring programme for aspiring footballers from disadvantaged backgrounds, and remained a director as of June 2024.

In December 2020, Lee was appointed chief executive of Gangwon FC. At 43, he was the youngest chief executive in the K League at the time. With the club facing relegation in late 2021, Lee recruited Choi Yong-soo as manager. Gangwon subsequently retained their K League 1 status through the relegation play-off and finished sixth in 2022, equalling the highest league position in the club's history. Lee's tenure was also credited with improvements in sponsorship, merchandising and community programmes. The Gangwon provincial government nevertheless declined to renew his contract without publicly identifying a specific reason. The decision prompted opposition from supporters and criticism from some members of the club's board and the provincial council, and Lee left the club at the end of 2022.

While leading Gangwon, Lee was appointed a vice-president of the Korea Football Association (KFA) in March 2021. The association said that it expected him to advise on grassroots expansion, player-development strategy and support policies for the K League. He resigned in April 2023, accepting responsibility for failing to prevent the KFA board from approving an amnesty for 100 sanctioned football figures, including 48 who had been involved in match-fixing. The association withdrew the amnesty three days after announcing it amid widespread criticism.

In April 2026, Ulsan HD FC appointed Lee as the first outside director in the club's history, with a remit that included contributing to its philosophy and medium- and long-term planning. In July 2026, he also joined the temporary K-Football Innovation Committee, established to consider reforms to football governance, youth development and the use of technology before the formation of the KFA's next administration.

=== Business ===
Lee founded Socks Up, a start-up producing products including socks and foot cream. He has said that he created the business to pursue sustainable social support rather than relying on one-off donations.

== Personal life ==
Lee became a Christian in his early twenties and has described his faith as a central influence on his values and outlook. He met Jang Bo-yoon in 2000, when she interviewed him at the K League All-Star Game. They married at Onnuri Church in Seoul on 6 June 2003 and have three daughters.

In 2009, Lee and university student Lee Seung-guk published 《성공이 성공이 아니고 실패가 실패가 아니다》 (literally, Success Is Not Success and Failure Is Not Failure), a book developed from a week of conversations about Lee's football career, personal philosophy and religious life. In 2018, he published two further collections of essays, 《생각이 내가 된다》 (Thought Becomes Me) and 《말하지 않아야 할 때》 (When Not to Speak), addressing lessons drawn from football, faith and his personal experiences.

Lee has supported several football-related charitable initiatives. In 2010, he donated ₩30 million to the football programme at Konkuk University, following a donation of ₩20 million in equipment the previous year, and also contributed to a youth football team in East Timor. He later was an ambassador for Compassion Korea and helped organise a charity football tournament in 2019 whose proceeds supported children pursuing football in Thailand and provided footballs to Compassion centres around the world.

== Career statistics ==
=== Club ===
Appearances and goals by club, season and competition
Club	Season	League			National cup		League cup		Continental		Other		Total	
Club	Season	Division	Apps	Goals	Apps	Goals	Apps	Goals	Apps	Goals	Apps	Goals	Apps	Goals
Anyang LG Cheetahs	2000	K League	15	2	0	0	3	0	2 (Note: Appearances in the Asian Cup Winners' Cup)	0	—		20	2
Anyang LG Cheetahs	2001	K League	22	0	1	0	7	0	2 (Note: Appearances in the Asian Club Championship)	0	—		32	0
Anyang LG Cheetahs	2002	K League	23	1	1	0	0	0	5	0	—		29	1
Anyang LG Cheetahs	Total		60	3	2	0	10	0	9	0	—		81	3
PSV Eindhoven	2002–03	Eredivisie	15	0	2	0	—		—		—		17	0
PSV Eindhoven	2003–04	Eredivisie	32	0	2	0	—		12 (Note: Six appearances in UEFA Champions League, six appearances in UEFA Cup)	0	1 (Note: Appearance in Johan Cruyff Shield)	0	47	0
PSV Eindhoven	2004–05	Eredivisie	31	1	4	0	—		14 (Note: Appearances in UEFA Champions League)	0	—		49	1
PSV Eindhoven	2005–06	Eredivisie	3	0	—		—		—		1	0	4	0
PSV Eindhoven	Total		81	1	8	0	—		26	0	2	0	117	1
Tottenham Hotspur	2005–06	Premier League	31	0	0	0	1	0	—		—		32	0
Tottenham Hotspur	2006–07	Premier League	21	0	5	0	1	0	4 (Note: Appearances in UEFA Cup)	0	—		31	0
Tottenham Hotspur	2007–08	Premier League	18	0	2	0	4	0	6	0	—		30	0
Tottenham Hotspur	Total		70	0	7	0	6	0	10	0	—		93	0
Borussia Dortmund	2008–09	Bundesliga	18	0	2	0	—		2	0	—		22	0
Al-Hilal	2009–10	Saudi Pro League	22	0	4	0	4	0	10 (Note: Appearances in the AFC Champions League)	1	—		40	1
Al-Hilal	2010–11	Saudi Pro League	24	0	5	0	3	0	5	0	—		37	0
Al-Hilal	Total		46	0	9	0	7	0	15	1	—		77	1
Vancouver Whitecaps FC	2012	Major League Soccer	33	1	2	0	—		—		1 (Note: Appearance in the MLS Cup playoffs)	0	36	1
Vancouver Whitecaps FC	2013	Major League Soccer	32	0	1	0	—		—		—		33	0
Vancouver Whitecaps FC	Total		65	1	3	0	—		—		1	0	69	1
Career total			340	5	31	0	23	0	62	1	3	0	459	6

=== International ===
Appearances and goals by national team and year
National team	Year	Apps	Goals
South Korea	1999	3	0
South Korea	2000	20	3
South Korea	2001	14	0
South Korea	2002	20	0
South Korea	2003	4	0
South Korea	2004	12	0
South Korea	2005	8	2
South Korea	2006	10	0
South Korea	2007	2	0
South Korea	2008	7	0
South Korea	2009	10	0
South Korea	2010	11	0
South Korea	2011	6	0
Career total		127	5

Scores and results list South Korea's goal tally first; the score column indicates the score after each Lee goal.

List of international goals scored by Lee Young-pyo
No.	Date	Venue	Cap	Opponent	Score	Result	Competition
1	28 July 2000	Workers' Stadium, Beijing, China	14	China	1–0	1–0	Friendly
2	4 October 2000	Al-Maktoum Stadium, Dubai, United Arab Emirates	15	United Arab Emirates	1–1	1–1 (a.e.t.) (2–3 p)	2000 LG Cup
3	13 October 2000	International Olympic Stadium, Tripoli, Lebanon	17	China	1–0	2–2	2000 AFC Asian Cup
4	9 February 2005	Seoul World Cup Stadium, Seoul, South Korea	74	Kuwait	2–0	2–0	2006 FIFA World Cup qualification
5	30 March 2005	Seoul World Cup Stadium, Seoul, South Korea	76	Uzbekistan	1–0	2–1	2006 FIFA World Cup qualification

== Filmography ==
=== Television ===
Year	Title	Role	Ref.
2014	Our Neighborhood Arts and Physical Education	Himself	
2020	Fly Shoot Dori: New Beginning	Himself	
2020–2021	Not Football or Baseball	Himself	
2021–present	Kick a Goal	Himself	
2024	Little Footballer 2024	Himself	
2025–2026	Run for Your Life	Himself	

== Honours ==
=== Player ===
Anyang LG Cheetahs

- K League: 2000
- Korean Super Cup: 2001
- Asian Club Championship runner-up: 2001–02

PSV Eindhoven

- Eredivisie: 2002–03, 2004–05
- KNVB Cup: 2004–05
- Johan Cruyff Shield: 2003

Tottenham Hotspur

- Football League Cup: 2007–08

Al-Hilal

- Saudi Pro League: 2009–10, 2010–11
- Saudi Crown Prince Cup: 2009–10, 2010–11

Vancouver Whitecaps FC

- Cascadia Cup: 2013

South Korea U23

- Asian Games bronze medal: 2002

South Korea

- AFC Asian Cup third place: 2000, 2011

Individual

- K League All-Star: 2000, 2001, 2002
- K League Best XI: 2001
- Vancouver Whitecaps FC Player of the Year: 2012
- AFC Fans' All-time XI at the FIFA World Cup: 2020

=== Television personality ===
List of awards and nominations received by TV personality Lee Young-pyo
Award ceremony	Year	Category	Nominated work	Result	Ref.
SBS Entertainment Awards	2022	Leader of the Year Award (Note: Shared with Ha Seok-ju, Kim Byung-ji, Kim Tae-young, Choi Jin-cheul, Choi Sung-yong, Lee Eul-yong, Hyun Young-min, Oh Beom-seok, Cho Jae-jin and Baek Ji-hoon)	Kick a Goal	Won	

== See also ==
- List of men's footballers with 100 or more international caps
