= Lee Woo-young =

South Korean footballer and manager

Personal information
- Full name: Lee Woo-young
- Date of birth: 19 August 1973 (age 53)
- Place of birth: South Korea
- Height: 1.86 m (6 ft 1 in)
- Position: Forward

Team information
- Current team: Senshu University (coach)

College career
Years	Team	Apps	(Gls)
- Yonsei University

Senior career*
Years	Team	Apps	(Gls)
1996–1997	Oita Trinity	20	(10)
1998	Anyang LG Cheetahs	1	(0)
Total		21	(10)

International career
1994–1996	South Korea U23	37 (Note: Includes eight appearances in non-international matches (seven appearances against non-national teams, one appearance against another KFA team).)	(9)
1995	South Korea	3	(1)

Managerial career
- 2007–2010: Keio University
- * Club domestic league appearances and goals

Lee Woo-young (Korean: 이우영, born 19 August 1973) is a South Korean football manager and former player. He played for South Korean under-23 team as a forward in the 1996 Summer Olympics. He retired early as a player at the age of 26 due to a knee injury. After his retirement, he coached Keio University from 2003 to 2010 (became a head coach since 2007) and Japanese Universiade team in 2013. He is a coach and a professor of Senshu University since 2012.
