= Sin Byung-ho =

South Korean footballer

Sin Byung-Ho 신병호
Personal information
- Full name: Sin Byung-Ho
- Date of birth: April 26, 1977 (age 49)
- Place of birth: Jeju, Jeju, South Korea
- Height: 1.77 m (5 ft 10 in)
- Position: Forward

Team information
- Current team: Jeju Middle School

Youth career
- 1996–1999: Konkuk University

Senior career*
Years	Team	Apps	(Gls)
2000	Yokohama F. Marinos	0	(0)
2000	Grêmio Esportivo Sãocarlense	0	(0)
2001	Mito HollyHock	28	(11)
2002	Ulsan Hyundai Horang-i	0	(0)
2002–2005	Chunnam Dragons	88	(26)
2006	Gyeongnam FC	16	(2)
2007–2008	Jeju United	10	(2)
Total		142	(41)

International career^{‡}
1999	South Korea U-23	10	(4)
1998–2000	South Korea	2	(0)

Managerial career
- 2008–: Jeju Middle School (Coach)
- * Club domestic league appearances and goals as of 19 November 2008 ‡ National team caps and goals as of 7 October 2008

Sin Byung-Ho (born April 26, 1977) is a South Korean former football player who played for Jeju United, Gyeongnam FC, Chunnam Dragons, Ulsan Hyundai Horang-i and Mito HollyHock in Japan.

On 2 November 2008, he announced his retirement. After retirement, he coached Jeju Middle School football team.

== Club statistics ==
Club performance			League		Cup		League Cup		Total	
Season	Club	League	Apps	Goals	Apps	Goals	Apps	Goals	Apps	Goals
Japan			League		Emperor's Cup		J.League Cup		Total	
2000	Yokohama F. Marinos	J1 League	0	0	0	0	0	0	0	0
2001	Mito HollyHock	J2 League	28	11	3	2	0	0	31	13
Korea Republic			League		FA Cup		K-League Cup		Total	
2002	Ulsan Hyundai Horang-i	K-League	0	0	?	?	7	1		
2002	Chunnam Dragons	K-League	26	8	?	?	0	0		
2003	Chunnam Dragons	K-League	42	16	5	4	-		47	20
2004	Chunnam Dragons	K-League	12	2	0	0	9	1	21	3
2005	Chunnam Dragons	K-League	8	0	0	0	0	0	8	0
2006	Gyeongnam FC	K-League	16	2	2	1	10	3	28	6
2007	Jeju United	K-League	8	0	1	0	6	0	15	0
2008	Jeju United	K-League	2	2	1	0	4	0	7	2
Country	Japan		28	11	3	2	0	0	31	13
Country	Korea Republic		114	30			36	5		
Total			142	41			36	5		

== National team statistics ==
Korea Republic national team
Year	Apps	Goals
1998	1	0
1999	0	0
2000	1	0
Total	2	0
