= Woo Sung-yong =

South Korean footballer (born 1974)

Personal information
- Date of birth: August 18, 1974 (age 52)
- Place of birth: Goseong, Gangwon, South Korea
- Height: 1.91 m (6 ft 3 in)
- Position: Forward

Youth career
- 1992–1995: Ajou University

Senior career*
Years	Team	Apps	(Gls)
1996–2002	Busan Daewoo Royals / Busan I'cons	151	(42)
2003–2004	Pohang Steelers	66	(25)
2005–2006	Seongnam Ilhwa Chunma	46	(18)
2007–2008	Ulsan Hyundai Horang-i	49	(11)
2009	Incheon United	14	(0)
Total		326	(96)

International career
1994–1996	South Korea U23	22	(4)
1995–2007	South Korea	13	(4)

Managerial career
- 2019: Seoul E-Land (caretaker)
- * Club domestic league appearances and goals

- Woo Sung-yong
- Hangul: 우성용
- Hanja: 禹成用
- RR: U Seongyong
- MR: U Sŏngyong

Woo Sung-yong (born August 18, 1974) is a South Korean former professional footballer who played as a forward.

== Career statistics ==
=== Club ===
Appearances and goals by club, season and competition
Club	Season	League			National cup		League cup		Total	
Club	Season	Division	Apps	Goals	Apps	Goals	Apps	Goals	Apps	Goals
Busan I'cons	1996	K-League	26	3			5	1	31	4
Busan I'cons	1997	K-League	15	0			15	2	30	2
Busan I'cons	1998	K-League	13	2			12	2	25	4
Busan I'cons	1999	K-League	26	7			12	2	38	9
Busan I'cons	2000	K-League	24	6			10	0	34	6
Busan I'cons	2001	K-League	22	11			11	5	33	16
Busan I'cons	2002	K-League	25	13			1	0	26	13
Pohang Steelers	2003	K-League	40	15	2	1	—		42	16
Pohang Steelers	2004	K-League	26	10	0	0	1	0	27	10
Seongnam Ilhwa Chunma	2005	K-League	18	2	2	1	12	1	32	4
Seongnam Ilhwa Chunma	2006	K-League	28	16	0	0	13	3	41	19
Ulsan Hyundai Horang-i	2007	K-League	26	8	3	1	9	1	38	10
Ulsan Hyundai Horang-i	2008	K-League	23	3	0	0	8	2	31	5
Incheon United	2009	K-League	14	0	1	0	4	1	19	1
Career total			326	96	8	3	113	20	447	119

=== International ===
Results list South Korea's goal tally first.

Date	Location	Opponent	Score	Result	Competition
September 25, 2003	Incheon, South Korea	Vietnam	1 goal	5–0	2004 AFC Asian Cup qualification
September 29, 2003	Incheon, South Korea	Nepal	3 goals	16–0	2004 AFC Asian Cup qualification
