= Choi Chul-woo =

South Korean footballer (born 1977)

Choi Chul-woo 최철우
Personal information
- Full name: Choi Chul-woo
- Date of birth: November 30, 1977 (age 48)
- Place of birth: Jeonbuk, South Korea
- Height: 1.85 m (6 ft 1 in)
- Position: Forward

Youth career
- 1997–1999: Korea University

Senior career*
Years	Team	Apps	(Gls)
2000–2001	Ulsan Hyundai Horang-i	16	(4)
2002–2003	Pohang Steelers	40	(6)
2004–2006	Bucheon SK / Jeju United	42	(8)
2007	Jeonbuk Hyundai Motors	5	(0)
2008	Busan IPark	5	(0)
2009	Ulsan Hyundai Mipo Dockyard		
2010	Home United FC		

International career^{‡}
1999–2000	South Korea U-23	23	(7)
2000	South Korea	10	(2)
- * Club domestic league appearances and goals as of 10 October 2008 ‡ National team caps and goals as of 10 October 2008

- Choi Chul-woo
- Hangul: 최철우
- Hanja: 崔喆宇
- RR: Choe Cheolu
- MR: Ch'oe Ch'ŏru

Choi Chul-woo (born November 30, 1977) is a former South Korean football player he is the currently caretaker manager of K League 2 club Seongnam.

His previous clubs is Ulsan Hyundai Horang-i, Pohang Steelers, Bucheon SK, Jeju United, Jeonbuk Hyundai Motors, Busan I'Park and Ulsan Hyundai Mipo Dockyard. He also spent his final career at Home United in the S-League.

He was a part of the South Korean team at the 2000 Summer Olympics.

== Club career statistics ==
Club performance			League		Cup		League Cup		Continental		Total	
Season	Club	League	Apps	Goals	Apps	Goals	Apps	Goals	Apps	Goals	Apps	Goals
South Korea			League		KFA Cup		League Cup		Asia		Total	
2000	Ulsan Hyundai Horang-i	K-League	9	4	?	?	3	1	—			
2001	Ulsan Hyundai Horang-i	K-League	7	0	?	?	1	0	—			
2002	Pohang Steelers	K-League	19	2	?	?	8	2	—			
2003	Pohang Steelers	K-League	21	4	3	2	—		—		24	6
2004	Bucheon SK	K-League	5	0	4	0	0	0	—		9	0
2005	Bucheon SK	K-League	18	5	0	0	7	1	—		25	6
2006	Jeju United	K-League	19	3	1	0	5	1	—		25	4
2007	Jeonbuk Hyundai Motors	K-League	5	0	0	0	7	1	?	?		
2008	Busan I'Park	K-League	5	0	1	1	4	0	—		10	1
2009	Ulsan Hyundai Mipo Dockyard	Korea National League					—		—			
Singapore			League		Singapore Cup		League Cup		Asia		Total	
2010	Home United FC	S-League							—			
Total	South Korea		108	18			35	6				
Total	Singapore											
Career total			108	18			35	6				

== International goals ==
Results list South Korea's goal tally first.

Date	Venue	Opponent	Score	Result	Competition
April 7, 2000	Seoul, South Korea	Mongolia	1 goal	6–0	2000 AFC Asian Cup qualification
June 7, 2000	Tehran, Iran	Macedonia	1 goal	2–1	2000 LG Cup
