= Park Jin-sub =

South Korean footballer (born 1977)

Park Jin-sub 박진섭
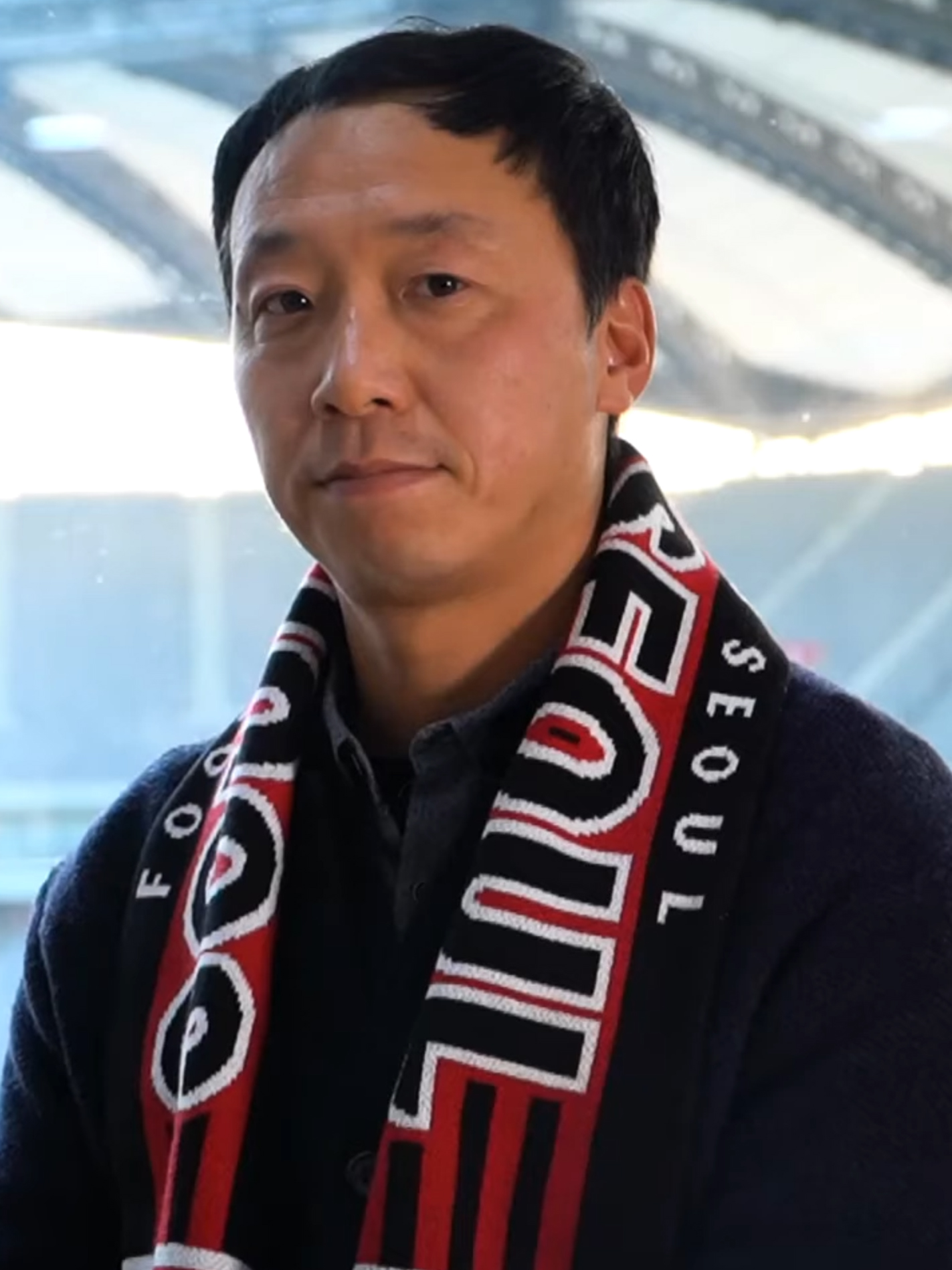
- Park in December 2020

Personal information
- Full name: Park Jin-sub
- Date of birth: March 11, 1977 (age 49)
- Place of birth: Seoul, South Korea
- Height: 1.78 m (5 ft 10 in)
- Position: Right back

Youth career
- 1996–1999: Korea University

Senior career*
Years	Team	Apps	(Gls)
2000–2001	Sangmu (army)		
2002–2005	Ulsan Hyundai Horang-i	91	(2)
2005–2008	Seongnam Ilhwa Chunma	97	(0)
2009–2010	Busan I'Park	39	(0)
2011–2012	Ulsan Hyundai Mipo Dockyard	28	(2)

International career^{‡}
1996–1997	South Korea U-20	8	(2)
1999–2000	South Korea U-23	29	(4)
1998–2004	South Korea	35	(5)

Managerial career
- 2018–2020: Gwangju FC
- 2021: FC Seoul
- 2022: Jeonbuk Hyundai Motors B
- 2022–2024: Busan IPark
- 2025–: Cheonan City
- * Club domestic league appearances and goals as of 18 June 2022 ‡ National team caps and goals as of 8 December 2020

- Park Jin-sub
- Hangul: 박진섭
- Hanja: 朴珍燮
- RR: Bak Jinseop
- MR: Pak Chinsŏp

Park Jin-sub (born March 11, 1977) is a former South Korean football manager and former player, who is the current manager of K League 2 club Cheonan City.

== Playing career ==
His playing career was spent in South Korea with Sangmu (2000–2001) while in the army, Ulsan Hyundai Horang-i (2002–2005), Seongnam Ilhwa Chunma (2005–2008), Busan I'Park (2009–2010), and Ulsan Hyundai Mipo Dockyard Dolphin (2011–2012).

== International career ==
Park Jin-sub has represented South Korea at youth level and part of the senior team squads. Between 1998 and 2004 he played 35 times and all of his 5 goals scored against Nepal on September 29, 2003.

== Managerial career ==
On 18 December 2017, Park was appointed as Gwangju FC manager.

On 8 December 2020, Park was appointed as FC Seoul manager.

On 6 January 2022 Park Jin-sub became manager of Jeonbuk Hyundai Motors B Team, for Jeonbuk Hyundai Motors's first season outside of the youth leagues as their reserve team participates in the K4 League along with other Reserve Teams.

On 3 June 2022, he was appointed as the new manager of Busan IPark after resignation of Ricardo Peres.

== Career statistics ==
=== International goals ===
1Results list South Korea's goal tally first.

Date	Venue	Opponent	Score	Result	Competition
September 29, 2003	Incheon, South Korea	Nepal	5 goals	16-0	2004 AFC Asian Cup qualification

== Honours ==
=== Player ===
Ulsan Hyundai FC

- K League 1: 2005

=== Manager ===
Gwangju FC

- K League 2: 2019
