= An Hyo-yeon =

South Korean footballer

An Hyo-Yeon 안효연
Personal information
- Full name: An Hyo-Yeon
- Date of birth: 16 April 1978 (age 48)
- Place of birth: Incheon, Republic of Korea
- Height: 1.83 m (6 ft 0 in)
- Positions: Forward; right winger

Youth career
- 1994–1996: Bupyeong High School

College career
Years	Team	Apps	(Gls)
1997–2000	Dongguk University		

Senior career*
Years	Team	Apps	(Gls)
2001–2002	Kyoto Purple Sanga	48	(11)
2003–2004	Busan I'cons	32	(4)
2005	Suwon Bluewings	18	(2)
2006–2008	Seongnam Ilhwa Chunma	16	(0)
2007–2008	→ Suwon Bluewings (Loan)	20	(2)
2009	Jeonnam Dragons	5	(0)
2009	Yokohama FC	18	(3)
2010	Home United FC	1	(0)
2010–2011	Persela Lamongan	8	(1)
2011–2012	Bintang Medan	12	(3)
2012–2013	PSMS Medan (IPL)	15	(3)
2013–2014	Lampang FC	11	(2)
Total		204	(31)

International career
1997	South Korea U-20	2	(0)
1999–2000	South Korea U-23	21	(2)
1998–2002	South Korea	14	(6)
- * Club domestic league appearances and goals

An Hyo-Yeon (Korean: 안효연; Korean pronunciation: [an.ɦjo.jʌn] or [an] [hjo.jʌn]; born 16 April 1978 in Incheon) is a South Korean retired footballer who played as striker.

His previous clubs were Kyoto Purple Sanga and Yokohama FC in Japan, Busan I'cons, Suwon Samsung Bluewings, Seongnam Ilhwa Chunma and Chunnam Dragons in South Korea. He was also registered as a Home United player in the S.League when their player registration period opens in June 2010. In September 2010 he joined Persela Lamongan before left in early January 2011.

== International career ==
An played for the South Korea national team at 2001 FIFA Confederations Cup in South Korea and Japan.

He also played for South Korea at the 1997 FIFA U-17 World Championship in China.

== Club statistics ==
Club performance			League		Cup		League Cup		Continental		Total	
Season	Club	League	Apps	Goals	Apps	Goals	Apps	Goals	Apps	Goals	Apps	Goals
Japan			League		Emperor's Cup		League Cup		Asia		Total	
2001	Kyoto Purple Sanga	J2 League	39	8	2	2	2	0	-		43	10
2002	Kyoto Purple Sanga	J1 League	7	1	0	0	5	1	-		12	2
South Korea			League		KFA Cup		League Cup		Asia		Total	
2003	Busan I'cons	K-League	14	0	0	0	-		-		14	0
2004	Busan I'cons	K-League	18	4	4	4	12	2	-		34	10
2005	Suwon Samsung Bluewings	K-League	18	2	2	0	12	1	?	?		
2006	Seongnam Ilhwa Chunma	K-League	16	0	1	0	12	1	-		29	1
2007	Suwon Samsung Bluewings	K-League	10	1	0	0	2	0	-		12	1
2008	Suwon Samsung Bluewings	K-League	10	1	0	0	5	1	-		15	2
2009	Chunnam Dragons	K-League	5	0	0	0	0	0	-		5	0
Japan			League		Emperor's Cup		League Cup		Asia		Total	
2009	Yokohama FC	J2 League	18	3	2	0	-		-		20	3
Total	Japan		73	15	4	0	7	1	-		84	16
Total	South Korea		91	8	7	4	43	5			141	17
Career total			164	23	11	4	50	6			225	33

== National team statistics ==
South Korea national team
Year	Apps	Goals
1998	3	0
1999	0	0
2000	3	5
2001	5	1
2002	3	0
Total	14	6

== International goals ==
Results list South Korea's goal tally first.

Date	Venue	Opponent	Score	Result	Competition
5 April 2000	Seoul, South Korea	Laos	1 goal	9–0	2000 AFC Asian Cup qualification
7 April 2000	Seoul, South Korea	Mongolia	2 goals	6–0	2000 AFC Asian Cup qualification
9 April 2000	Seoul, South Korea	Myanmar	2 goals	4–0	2000 AFC Asian Cup qualification
26 April 2001	Cairo, Egypt	Egypt	1 goal	2–1	2001 LG Cup
