= Super Match =

Association football rivalry in South Korea

- Other names: FC Seoul vs Suwon Samsung Bluewings
- Location: Seoul Metropolitan Area
- Teams: FC Seoul; Suwon Samsung Bluewings
- First meeting: 10 April 1996
- Latest meeting: 25 November 2023; K League 1 Seoul 0–1 Suwon
- Broadcasters: JTBC Golf&Sports, Sky Sports

Statistics
- Total meetings: 112
- Most wins: Seoul (43)
- Most player appearances: Suwon: Kwak Hee-ju (34); Seoul: Dejan Damjanović (27)
- Top scorer: Park Chu-young (10)
- All-time series: Seoul: 43; Drawn: 30; Suwon: 39
- Largest victory: Suwon 5–1 Anyang (20 March 1999); Suwon 5–1 Seoul (18 April 2015)

The Super Match (Korean: 슈퍼매치) is a name for a football rivalry between two South Korean football teams from the Seoul Metropolitan Area, FC Seoul and Suwon Samsung Bluewings. The match and the rivalry between the two teams is regarded as the biggest in the South Korean K League.

The first match was played in 1996. The rivalry became more fierce in 2004, after Anyang LG Cheetahs relocated to Seoul and changed the club's name to FC Seoul.

== History ==
In 1996, neighboring Gyeonggi cities of Anyang and Suwon started hosting K League clubs. LG Cheetahs (currently FC Seoul), based in Seoul between 1990 and 1995, has relocated to Anyang under decentralization policy in K League. Suwon has hosted the newly founded Suwon Samsung Bluewings since that year.

For Suwon in early days, main rivals were Ulsan Hyundai and Pusan Daewoo which had fierce showdowns in the league finals in 1996 and 1997. Anyang and Suwon became rivals between 1998 and 1999, after former Suwon assistant coach Cho Kwang-rae joined Anyang and former Anyang player Seo Jung-won transferred to Suwon after his short spell with RC Strasbourg to beat Anyang 5–1 in the 1999 Korean Super Cup. Also a fact that the club's parent companies (LG Electronics and Samsung Electronics) being industrial arch rivals, boosted the rivalry. The match up was informally named Jijidae Derby in 2003, after a hill on the National Route 1 connecting two cities.

The rivalry between the two clubs became more fierce after 2004, when Anyang LG Cheetahs relocated back to Seoul and changed the club's name to FC Seoul. Since then, the rivalry has been promoted heavily by the league and media for commercial reasons, and is officially named "Super Match" since 2009.

== Venues ==
FC Seoul	Super Match is located in South Korea	Suwon Samsung Bluewings
Seoul World Cup Stadium	Super Match is located in South Korea	Suwon World Cup Stadium
Capacity: 66,704	Super Match is located in South Korea	Capacity: 44,031

== Players who have played for both clubs ==
- (South Korea) Kim Dong-hae (Seoul: 1989–1995; Suwon: 1996)
- (South Korea) Park Chul-woo (Seoul: 1992–1994; Suwon: 1996–1997)
- (South Korea) Seo Jung-won (Seoul: 1992–1997; Suwon: 1999–2004)
- (South Korea) Park Jung-suk (Suwon: 1996–2000; Seoul: 2001–2007)
- (South Korea) Lee Ki-hyung (Suwon: 1996–2002; Seoul: 2005–2006)
- (Tajikistan) Vitaliy Parakhnevych (Suwon: 1998–2000; Seoul: 2001)
- (Brazil) Tuta (Seoul: 2002; Suwon: 2003)
- (South Korea) Lee Jung-soo (Seoul: 2002–2004; Suwon: 2006–2008 and 2016–2017)
- (South Korea) Han Dong-won (Seoul: 2002–2006; Suwon: 2012)
- (South Korea) Lee Jong-min (Suwon: 2002–2004 and 2013; Seoul: 2008–2012)
- (South Korea) Baek Ji-hoon (Seoul: 2005–2006; Suwon: 2006–2016)
- (South Korea) Park Sung-bae (Seoul: 2005–2006; Suwon: 2007)
- (South Korea) Choi Jae-soo (Seoul: 2004–2007; Suwon: 2012–2015)
- (South Korea) Cho Chan-ho (Suwon: 2015; Seoul: 2016–2017)
- (South Korea) Lee Sang-ho (Suwon: 2009–2016; Seoul: 2017–2018)
- (Montenegro) Dejan Damjanović (Seoul: 2008–2013 and 2016–2017; Suwon: 2018–2019)
- (South Korea) Cho Ji-hun (Suwon: 2011–2018; Seoul: 2022)
- (South Korea) Lim Sang-hyub (Suwon: 2018–2020; Seoul: 2023–2024)
- (South Korea) Lee Si-young (Seoul: 2023–present; Suwon: 2024 (on loan))
- (Germany) Stanislav Iljutcenko (Seoul: 2022–2024; Suwon: 2025–2026)
- (South Korea) Kang Seong-jin (Seoul: 2021–2025; Suwon: 2025–present)

== Match reports ==
All times are KST (UTC+09:00).

=== League matches ===
==== 1990s ====
1996 K League
16 June 1996
15:00

Anyang LG Cheetahs	0–2	Suwon Samsung Bluewings
	Report	Park Kun-ha 70'; Alaor 77'

Anyang Stadium
Attendance: 32,865
Referee: Jung Jong
1996 K League
25 July 1996
19:00

Suwon Samsung Bluewings	2–1	Anyang LG Cheetahs
Badea 37'; Yoon Sung-hyo 76'	Report	Yoon Sang-chul 83' (pen.)

Suwon Stadium
Attendance: 8,531
Referee: Kim Jin-ok
1996 K League
24 August 1996
19:00

Anyang LG Cheetahs	0–0	Suwon Samsung Bluewings
	Report

Dongdaemun Stadium
Attendance: 4,850
Referee: Kim Kwang-taek
1996 K League
10 October 1996
19:00

Suwon Samsung Bluewings	2–0	Anyang LG Cheetahs
Badea 37'; Park Kun-ha 72'	Report

Suwon Stadium
Attendance: 13,723
Referee: Lee Sang-yong

1997 K League
28 June 1997
19:00

Suwon Samsung Bluewings	1–1	Anyang LG Cheetahs
Yoon Sung-hyo 69'	Report	Mutamba 77'

Suwon Stadium
Attendance: 8,355
Referee: Kim Kwang-taek
1997 K League
9 August 1997
19:00

Anyang LG Cheetahs	0–1	Suwon Samsung Bluewings
	Report	Lee Byung-keun 90'

Anyang Stadium
Attendance: 3,753
Referee: Kim Kwang-taek

1998 K League
26 August 1998
19:00

Suwon Samsung Bluewings	2–1 (a.e.t.)	Anyang LG Cheetahs
Denis 82' (pen.); Drakulić 113'	Report	Park Jong-in 90+5'

Suwon Stadium
Attendance: 19,567
Referee: Son Jong-Deok
1998 K League
20 September 1998
15:00

Anyang LG Cheetahs	1–1 (a.e.t.)	Suwon Samsung Bluewings
Kang Chun-ho 17'	Report	Shin Hong-gi 22' (pen.)
Penalties
Kim Gwi-hwa (penalty scored); Je Yong-sam (penalty missed); Kim Sung-il (penalty scored); Kang Chun-ho (penalty scored); Kim Bong-soo (penalty missed)	3–4	(penalty scored) Shin Hong-gi; (penalty scored) Ko Jong-soo; (penalty scored) Park Kun-ha; (penalty missed) Vitaliy; (penalty scored) Mihai

Anyang Stadium
Attendance: 20,085
Referee: Kim Young-joo

1999 K League
2 June 1999
19:00

Anyang LG Cheetahs	0–1	Suwon Samsung Bluewings
	Report	Shin Hong-gi 63' (pen.)

Anyang Stadium
Attendance: 14,235
Referee: Kwon Jong-chul
1999 K League
21 July 1999
19:30

Anyang LG Cheetahs	0–4	Suwon Samsung Bluewings
	Report	Seo Jung-won 34'; Drakulić 76'; Vitaliy 86'; Cho Hyun-doo 90'

Changwon Stadium
Attendance: 33,041
Referee: Wang Jong-gook
1999 K League
6 October 1999
19:00

Suwon Samsung Bluewings	2–3	Anyang LG Cheetahs
Vitaliy 4'; Park Kun-ha 42'	Report	Choi Yong-soo 17'; Jung Hyun-ho 90+1'; Jung Kwang-min 90+3'

Suwon Stadium
Attendance: 14,521
Referee: Lim Eun-joo

==== 2000s ====
2000 K League
21 May 2000
15:00

Anyang LG Cheetahs	2–1	Suwon Samsung Bluewings
Choi Yong-soo 37'; Jung Kwang-min 53'	Report	Lee Kyung-woo 24'

Anyang Stadium
Attendance: 21,826
Referee: Park Jong-kyu
2000 K League
25 June 2000
19:00

Suwon Samsung Bluewings	0–1	Anyang LG Cheetahs
	Report	Jung Kwang-min 19'

Suwon Stadium
Attendance: 20,614
Referee: Kim Hoi-sung
2000 K League
30 September 2000
19:00

Anyang LG Cheetahs	3–2	Suwon Samsung Bluewings
Choi Yong-soo 30', 43'; Koubek 81'	Report	Ryu Woong-ryeol 20'; Denis 54'

Anyang Stadium
Attendance: 6,012
Referee: Kwon Jong-chul

2001 K League
17 June 2001
15:00

Anyang LG Cheetahs	1–0	Suwon Samsung Bluewings
Koubek 25'	Report

Anyang Stadium
Attendance: 21,232
Referee: Kim Hoi-sung
2001 K League
25 July 2001
19:00

Anyang LG Cheetahs	1–0	Suwon Samsung Bluewings
Ricardo 37'	Report

Mokdong Stadium
Attendance: 11,073
Referee: Han Byung-hwa
2001 K League
17 October 2001
19:00

Suwon Samsung Bluewings	0–1	Anyang LG Cheetahs
	Report	Ricardo 16'

Suwon World Cup Stadium
Attendance: 15,124
Referee: Kim Hoi-sung

2002 K League
14 July 2002
19:00

Anyang LG Cheetahs	3–0	Suwon Samsung Bluewings
Park Yun-hwa 3'; André 60'; Marcos Denner 90+3'	Report

Anyang Stadium
Attendance: 21,294
Referee: Lee Sang-yong
2002 K League
18 August 2002
19:00

Suwon Samsung Bluewings	1–2	Anyang LG Cheetahs
Park Kun-ha 61'	Report	André 28'; Jin Soon-jin 85'

Suwon World Cup Stadium
Attendance: 38,245
Referee: Kwon Jong-chul
2002 K League
13 November 2002
19:30

Suwon Samsung Bluewings	4–1	Anyang LG Cheetahs
Gabi 20', 61'; Denis 56'; Seo Jung-won 82'	Report	Kim Seong-jae 36'

Suwon World Cup Stadium
Attendance: 8,356
Referee: Lee Sang-yong

2003 K League
7 May 2003
15:00

Suwon Samsung Bluewings	3–1	Anyang LG Cheetahs
Seo Jung-won 24'; Tuta 86'; Gabi 90+1'	Report	Kim Dong-jin 27'

Suwon World Cup Stadium
Attendance: 18,930
Referee: Lee Sang-yong
2003 K League
22 June 2003
19:00

Anyang LG Cheetahs	2–2	Suwon Samsung Bluewings
Jung Jo-gook 54'; Ricardo 59'	Report	Jung Yong-hoon 24'; Kim Do-heon 29'

Anyang Stadium
Attendance: 17,521
Referee: Peter Gagelmann (Germany)
2003 K League
14 September 2003
15:00

Suwon Samsung Bluewings	2–0	Anyang LG Cheetahs
Nádson 35'; Eninho 87'	Report

Suwon World Cup Stadium
Attendance: 21,360
Referee: Kwon Jong-chul
2003 K League
8 October 2003
19:30

Anyang LG Cheetahs	1–2	Suwon Samsung Bluewings
Park Yo-seb 39'	Report	Nádson 86', 88'

Anyang Stadium
Attendance: 7,375
Referee: Felix Brych (Germany)

2004 K League
23 May 2004
15:00

FC Seoul	1–0	Suwon Samsung Bluewings
Ricardo 15'	Report

Seoul World Cup Stadium
Attendance: 30,751
Referee: Lee Sam-ho
2004 K League
3 October 2004
17:00

Suwon Samsung Bluewings	1–0	FC Seoul
Kim Do-heon 82'	Report

Suwon World Cup Stadium
Attendance: 19,836
Referee: Knut Kircher (Germany)

2005 K League
12 June 2005
19:00

FC Seoul	1–1	Suwon Samsung Bluewings
Choi Jae-soo 12'	Report	Kim Dae-eui 88'

Seoul World Cup Stadium
Attendance: 19,385
Referee: Lee Jong-gook
2005 K League
23 October 2005
15:00

Suwon Samsung Bluewings	0–3	FC Seoul
	Report	Park Chu-young 20'; Jung Jo-gook 51'; Han Tae-you 69'

Suwon World Cup Stadium
Attendance: 33,479
Referee: Kwon Jong-chul

2006 K League
12 March 2006
14:00

Suwon Samsung Bluewings	1–1	FC Seoul
Itamar 64' (pen.)	Report	Park Chu-young 78' (pen.)

Suwon World Cup Stadium
Attendance: 33,819
Referee: Lee Young-chul
2006 K League
23 August 2006
20:00

FC Seoul	1–1	Suwon Samsung Bluewings
Dudu 18'	Report	Lee Kwan-woo 63'

Seoul World Cup Stadium
Attendance: 41,237
Referee: Ko Kum-bok

2007 K League
8 April 2007
15:00

FC Seoul	0–1	Suwon Samsung Bluewings
	Report	Ha Tae-goon 17'

Seoul World Cup Stadium
Attendance: 55,397
Referee: Lee Sang-yong
2007 K League
19 August 2007
19:00

Suwon Samsung Bluewings	2–1	FC Seoul
Lee Kwan-woo 45'; Kim Dae-eui 50'	Report	Kim Dong-suk 57'

Suwon World Cup Stadium
Attendance: 41,819
Referee: Choi Kwang-bo

2008 K League
13 April 2008
15:00

FC Seoul	0–2	Suwon Samsung Bluewings
	Report	Shin Young-rok 51', 62'

Seoul World Cup Stadium
Attendance: 44,239
Referee: Choi Kwang-bo
2008 K League
29 October 2008
19:30

Suwon Samsung Bluewings	0–1	FC Seoul
	Report	Ki Sung-yueng 90+2'

Suwon World Cup Stadium
Attendance: 26,713
Referee: Ko Kum-bok
2008 K League Championship 1st leg
3 December 2008
20:00

FC Seoul	1–1	Suwon Samsung Bluewings
Adi 21'	Report	Kwak Hee-ju 79'

Seoul World Cup Stadium
Attendance: 39,011
Referee: Peter Gagelmann (Germany)
2008 K League Championship 2nd leg
7 December 2008
14:00

Suwon Samsung Bluewings	2–1	FC Seoul
Edu 11'; Song Chong-gug 36'	Report	Jung Jo-gook 25' (pen.)

Suwon World Cup Stadium
Attendance: 41,044
Referee: Felix Brych (Germany)

2009 K League
4 April 2009
17:00

FC Seoul	1–0	Suwon Samsung Bluewings
Lee Chung-yong 68'	Report

Seoul World Cup Stadium
Attendance: 32,075
Referee: Choi Kwang-bo
2009 K League
1 August 2009
19:30

Suwon Samsung Bluewings	2–0	FC Seoul
An Yong-hak 51'; Tiago 85'	Report

Suwon World Cup Stadium
Attendance: 35,058
Referee: Choi Kwang-bo

==== 2010s ====
2010 K League
4 April 2010
15:00

FC Seoul	3–1	Suwon Samsung Bluewings
Esteves 24'; Jung Jo-gook 27'; Choi Hyo-jin 32'	Report	Kang Min-soo 47'

Seoul World Cup Stadium
Attendance: 48,558
Referee: Choi Kwang-bo
2010 K League
28 August 2010
19:30

Suwon Samsung Bluewings	4–2	FC Seoul
Kim Jin-kyu 3' (o.g.); Lee Sang-ho 26'; Takahara 84', 90'	Report	Hyun Young-Min 52' (pen.); Damjanović 56'

Suwon World Cup Stadium
Attendance: 42,377
Referee: Choi Kwang-bo

2011 K League
6 March 2011
14:00

FC Seoul	0–2	Suwon Samsung Bluewings
	Report	Geynrikh 40'; Oh Jang-eun 60'

Seoul World Cup Stadium
Attendance: 51,606
Referee: Choi Myung-yong
2011 K League
3 October 2011
15:30

Suwon Samsung Bluewings	1–0	FC Seoul
Stevo 78'	Report

Suwon World Cup Stadium
Attendance: 44,537
Referee: Choi Kwang-bo

2012 K League
1 April 2012
15:00

Suwon Samsung Bluewings	2–0	FC Seoul
Park Hyun-beom 24'; Stevo 34'	Report

Suwon World Cup Stadium
Attendance: 45,192
Referee: Lee Min-hoo
2012 K League
18 August 2012
19:00

FC Seoul	0–2	Suwon Samsung Bluewings
	Report	Radončić 7' (pen.), 81'

Seoul World Cup Stadium
Attendance: 50,787
Referee: Kim Sung-ho
2012 K League
3 October 2012
14:00

Suwon Samsung Bluewings	1–0	FC Seoul
Oh Jang-eun 50'	Report

Suwon World Cup Stadium
Attendance: 43,352
Referee: Choi Myung-yong
2012 K League
4 November 2012
14:00

FC Seoul	1–1	Suwon Samsung Bluewings
Jung Jo-gook 40'	Report	Lee Sang-ho 23'

Seoul World Cup Stadium
Attendance: 40,510
Referee: Ryu Hee-Seon

2013 K League Classic
14 April 2013
14:00

Suwon Samsung Bluewings	1–1	FC Seoul
Radončić 87'	Report	Damjanović 19'

Suwon World Cup Stadium
Attendance: 37,897
Referee: Choi Myung-yong
2013 K League Classic
3 August 2013
19:00

FC Seoul	2–1	Suwon Samsung Bluewings
Adi 29'; Kim Jin-kyu 53'	Report	Cho Ji-hun 79'

Seoul World Cup Stadium
Attendance: 43,681
Referee: Yoo Sun-ho
2013 K League Classic
9 October 2013
13:00

Suwon Samsung Bluewings	2–0	FC Seoul
Santos 58'; Jong Tae-se 82'	Report

Suwon World Cup Stadium
Attendance: 36,476
Referee: Woo Sang-il
2013 K League Classic
2 November 2013
14:00

FC Seoul	2–1	Suwon Samsung Bluewings
Damjanović 34', 75'	Report	Jong Tae-se 5'

Seoul World Cup Stadium
Attendance: 25,761
Referee: Choi Myung-yong

2014 K League Classic
27 April 2014
14:15

Suwon Samsung Bluewings	0–1	FC Seoul
	Report	Escudero 77'

Suwon World Cup Stadium
Attendance: 29,318
Referee: Kim Sang-woo
2014 K League Classic
12 July 2014
19:00

FC Seoul	2–0	Suwon Samsung Bluewings
Kim Jin-kyu 43'; Yun Ju-tae 90+4'	Report

Seoul World Cup Stadium
Attendance: 46,549
Referee: Choi Myung-yong
2014 K League Classic
5 October 2014
14:00

FC Seoul	0–1	Suwon Samsung Bluewings
	Report	Roger 54'

Seoul World Cup Stadium
Attendance: 46,549
Referee: Ryu Sun-ho
2014 K League Classic
9 November 2014
14:00

Suwon Samsung Bluewings	0–1	FC Seoul
	Report	Go Yo-han 90+3'

Suwon World Cup Stadium
Attendance: 34,029
Referee: Choi Myung-yong

2015 K League Classic
18 April 2015
15:00

Suwon Samsung Bluewings	5–1	FC Seoul
Lee Sang-ho 22', 52'; Yeom Ki-hun 48'; Jong Tae-se 67', 89'	Report	Molina 43'

Suwon World Cup Stadium
Attendance: 26,520
Referee: Kim Jong-hyeok
2015 K League Classic
27 June 2015
17:00

FC Seoul	0–0	Suwon Samsung Bluewings
	Report

Seoul World Cup Stadium
Attendance: 39,328
Referee: Kim Sung-ho
2015 K League Classic
19 September 2015
15:05

Suwon Samsung Bluewings	0–3	FC Seoul
	Report	Adriano 20' (pen.), 40'; Cha Du-ri 42'

Suwon World Cup Stadium
Attendance: 29,046
Referee: Lee Dong-jun
2015 K League Classic
7 November 2015
15:00

FC Seoul	4–3	Suwon Samsung Bluewings
Yun Ju-tae 28', 45+1', 55', 62'	Report	Santos 56'; Kwon Chang-hoon 64'; Shin Se-gye 90'

Seoul World Cup Stadium
Attendance: 23,308
Referee: Park Byung-jin

2016 K League Classic
30 April 2016
15:00

Suwon Samsung Bluewings	1–1	FC Seoul
Santos 6'	Report	Adriano 57'

Suwon World Cup Stadium
Attendance: 28,109
Referee: Kim Sang-woo
2016 K League Classic
18 June 2016
19:00

FC Seoul	1–1	Suwon Samsung Bluewings
Adriano 74' (pen.)	Report	Kwak Hee-ju 81'

Seoul World Cup Stadium
Attendance: 47,899
Referee: Song Min-seok
2016 K League Classic
13 August 2016
19:00

FC Seoul	1–0	Suwon Samsung Bluewings
Yun Il-lok 26'	Report

Seoul World Cup Stadium
Attendance: 36,309
Referee: Kim Jong-hyeok

2017 K League Classic
5 March 2017
15:00

FC Seoul	1–1	Suwon Samsung Bluewings
Lee Sang-ho 62'	Report	Kim Min-woo 9'

Seoul World Cup Stadium
Attendance: 34,376
Referee: Kim Dong-jin
2017 K League Classic
18 June 2017
18:00

Suwon Samsung Bluewings	1–2	FC Seoul
Johnathan 34'	Report	Ha Dae-sung 32'; Yun Il-lok 66'

Suwon World Cup Stadium
Attendance: 20,140
Referee: Ko Hyung-jin
2017 K League Classic
12 August 2017
19:00

Suwon Samsung Bluewings	0–1	FC Seoul
	Report	Kwak Kwang-seon 61' (o.g.)

Suwon World Cup Stadium
Attendance: 26,581
Referee: Kim Jong-hyeok
2017 K League Classic
21 October 2017
15:00

FC Seoul	2–2	Suwon Samsung Bluewings
Damjanović 56' (pen.); Yun Il-lok 74'	Report	Lee Yong-rae 50'; Johnathan 90+4' (pen.)

Seoul World Cup Stadium
Attendance: 27,257
Referee: Lee Dong-jun

2018 K League 1
8 April 2018
14:00

Suwon Samsung Bluewings	0–0	FC Seoul
	Report

Suwon World Cup Stadium
Attendance: 13,122
Referee: Kim Dong-jin
2018 K League 1
5 May 2018
16:00

FC Seoul	2–1	Suwon Samsung Bluewings
Anderson 2', 29'	Report	Yeom Ki-hun 86' (pen.)

Seoul World Cup Stadium
Attendance: 29,617
Referee: Kim Woo-sung
2018 K League 1
15 August 2018
19:00

Suwon Samsung Bluewings	1–2	FC Seoul
Damjanović 4'	Report	Go Yo-han 49'; Anderson 90+1'

Suwon World Cup Stadium
Attendance: 13,853
Referee: Kim Sung-ho

2019 K League 1
5 May 2019
16:00

Suwon Samsung Bluewings	1–1	FC Seoul
Damjanović 56'	Report	Park Chu-young 90+9' (pen.)

Suwon World Cup Stadium
Attendance: 24,019
Referee: Kim Dong-jin
2019 K League 1
16 June 2019
19:00

FC Seoul	4–2	Suwon Samsung Bluewings
Osmar 11', 79'; Pešić 61', 82'	Report	Han Eui-kwon 16'; Taggart 90+2'

Seoul World Cup Stadium
Attendance: 32,057
Referee: Ko Hyung-jin
2019 K League 1
6 October 2019
14:00

Suwon Samsung Bluewings	1–2	FC Seoul
Yeom Ki-hun 59'	Report	Park Chu-young 17' (pen.); Lee Myung-joo 54'

Suwon World Cup Stadium
Attendance: 16,241
Referee: Kim Dae-yong

==== 2020s ====
2020 K League 1
4 July 2020
20:00

Suwon Samsung Bluewings	3–3	FC Seoul
Taggart 11' (pen.), 42'; Kim Gun-hee 45+2'	Report	Park Chu-young 28'; Cho Young-wook 57'; Ko Kwang-min 61'

Suwon World Cup Stadium
Attendance: 0
Referee: Kim Yong-woo
2020 K League 1
13 September 2020
17:30

FC Seoul	2–1	Suwon Samsung Bluewings
Jo Sung-jin 7' (o.g.); Han Seung-gyu 61'	Report	Yeom Ki-hun 19' (pen.)

Seoul World Cup Stadium
Attendance: 0
Referee: Kim Woo-sung
2020 K League 1
26 September 2020
14:00

Suwon Samsung Bluewings	3–1	FC Seoul
Taggart 14', 63', 90+1'	Report	Park Chu-young 54'

Suwon World Cup Stadium
Attendance: 0
Referee: Park Byung-jin

2021 K League 1
21 March 2021
16:30

Suwon Samsung Bluewings	1–2	FC Seoul
Jeong Sang-bin 16'	Report	Ki Sung-yueng 45+4'; Park Jung-bin 80'

Suwon World Cup Stadium
Attendance: 3,311
Referee: Ko Hyung-jin
2021 K League 1
29 May 2021
19:00

FC Seoul	0–3	Suwon Samsung Bluewings
	Report	Kim Gun-hee 39' (pen.); Kim Min-woo 50'; Min Sang-gi 67'

Seoul World Cup Stadium
Attendance: 4,976
Referee: Kim Jong-hyeok
2021 K League 1
26 September 2021
15:00

Suwon Samsung Bluewings	0–2	FC Seoul
	Report	Cho Young-wook 64'; Na Sang-ho 86' (pen.)

Suwon World Cup Stadium
Attendance: 0
Referee: Lee Dong-jun

2022 K League 1
10 April 2022
19:00

FC Seoul	2–0	Suwon Samsung Bluewings
Paločević 80'; Na Sang-ho 90+2'	Report

Seoul World Cup Stadium
Attendance: 14,625
Referee: Lee Dong-jun
2022 K League 1
19 June 2022
19:30

Suwon Samsung Bluewings	0–1	FC Seoul
	Report	Cho Young-wook 58'

Suwon World Cup Stadium
Attendance: 12,922
Referee: Ko Hyung-jin
2022 K League 1
4 September 2022
16:30

FC Seoul	1–3	Suwon Samsung Bluewings
Iljutcenko 90'	Report	Oh Hyun-gyu 28', 64'; An Byong-jun 32'

Seoul World Cup Stadium
Attendance: 16,333
Referee: Jeong Dong-sik
2022 K League 1
9 October 2022
14:00

Suwon Samsung Bluewings	0–0	FC Seoul
	Report

Suwon World Cup Stadium
Attendance: 10,818
Referee: Kim Jong-hyeok

2023 K League 1
22 April 2023
14:00

FC Seoul	3–1	Suwon Samsung Bluewings
Na Sang-ho 38'; Hwang Ui-jo 53'; Paločević 82'	Report	Mulić 89'

Seoul World Cup Stadium
Attendance: 30,186
Referee: Jeong Dong-sik
2023 K League 1
24 June 2023
16:30

Suwon Samsung Bluewings	0–1	FC Seoul
	Report	Willyan 87'

Suwon World Cup Stadium
Attendance: 19,513
Referee: Kim Woo-sung
2023 K League 1
2 September 2023
16:30

Suwon Samsung Bluewings	0–1	FC Seoul
	Report	Iljutcenko 2'

Suwon World Cup Stadium
Attendance: 22,882
Referee: Ko Hyung-jin
2023 K League 1
25 November 2023
16:30

FC Seoul	0–1	Suwon Samsung Bluewings
	Report	Bassani 64'

Seoul World Cup Stadium
Attendance: 36,007
Referee: Park Byung-jin

=== League Cup matches ===
1996 League Cup
10 April 1996
19:00

Suwon Samsung Bluewings	2–2	Anyang LG Cheetahs
Cho Hyun-doo 72'; Park Kun-ha 90+2'	Report	Jassim 57' (pen.); Skachenko 67'

Suwon Stadium
Attendance: 14,200
Referee: Kim Young-joo

1997 League Cup
2 April 1997
16:00

Anyang LG Cheetahs	4–4	Suwon Samsung Bluewings
Seo Jung-won 36' (pen.), 42'; Mutamba 74'; Skachenko 79'	Report	Oli 21'; Lee Kee-keun 52'; Park Kun-ha 65', 67'

Anyang Stadium
Attendance: 4,327
Referee: Wang Jong-gook

1998 League Cup Group A
31 March 1998
19:00

Suwon Samsung Bluewings	1–0	Anyang LG Cheetahs
Lee Jin-haeng 50'	Report

Suwon Stadium
Attendance: 5,881
Referee: Wang Jong-gook
1998 League Cup Group A
4 April 1998
15:00

Anyang LG Cheetahs	1–0 (a.e.t.)	Suwon Samsung Bluewings
Victor 91'	Report

Gumi Civic Stadium
Attendance: 23,725
Referee: Lee Jae-sung
1998 League Cup
26 May 1998
19:00

Anyang LG Cheetahs	1–1 (a.e.t.)	Suwon Samsung Bluewings
Je Yong-sam 72'	Report	Yoon Sung-hyo 82'
Penalties
Jung Kwang-min (penalty scored); Kim Gwi-hwa (penalty scored); Kim Hak-cheol (penalty missed); Oh Myung-kwan (penalty missed); Kim Dae-sung (penalty missed); Kim Bong-soo (penalty missed)	2–3	(penalty scored) Badea; (penalty scored) Shin Hong-gi; (penalty missed) Yoon Sung-hyo; (penalty missed) Kim Jin-woo; (penalty missed) Kim Young-sun; (penalty scored) Jung Yong-hoon

Anyang Stadium
Attendance: 5,004
Referee: Lee Sang-yong

1999 League Cup
11 August 1999
19:00

Suwon Samsung Bluewings	4–2	Anyang LG Cheetahs
Drakulić 27', 90+2'; Shin Hong-gi 45+3'; Ko Jong-soo 49'	Report	Jung Kwang-min 10', 40'

Dongdaemun Stadium
Attendance: 24,874
Referee: Han Byung-hwa

2000 League Cup Group A
29 March 2000
19:00

Anyang LG Cheetahs	0–0 (a.e.t.)	Suwon Samsung Bluewings
	Report
Penalties
Choi Yong-soo (penalty missed); Stojisavljević (penalty scored); Kim Seong-jae (penalty scored); Park Jung-hwan (penalty scored); Son Hyun-jun (penalty missed); Han Sang-gu (penalty scored); Wang Jung-hyun (penalty missed)	4–5	(penalty scored) Shin Hong-gi; (penalty scored) Denis; (penalty missed) Luțu; (penalty missed) Lee Gi-bum; (penalty scored) Kim Jin-woo; (penalty scored) Kim Jae-shin; (penalty scored) Vitaliy

Changwon Stadium
Attendance: 14,705
Referee: Kim Tae-young
2000 League Cup Group A
9 April 2000
15:00

Suwon Samsung Bluewings	5–4	Anyang LG Cheetahs
Lee Kyung-woo 17', 86'; Vitaliy 20', 48'; Yang Jong-hu 28'	Report	Jung Kwang-min 16'; Lee Sang-hun 19'; André 26'; Choi Yong-soo 87'

Suwon Stadium
Attendance: 8,413
Referee: Lee Sang-kwon

2001 League Cup Group A
8 April 2001
15:00

Anyang LG Cheetahs	1–0	Suwon Samsung Bluewings
Park Yong-ho 37'	Report

Anyang Stadium
Attendance: 12,042
Referee: Wang Jong-gook
2001 League Cup Group A
2 May 2001
19:00

Suwon Samsung Bluewings	1–0	Anyang LG Cheetahs
Ko Jong-soo 19'	Report

Suwon Stadium
Attendance: 16,555
Referee: Lim Jong-ho

2004 League Cup
8 August 2004
19:00

FC Seoul	0–0	Suwon Samsung Bluewings
	Report

Seoul World Cup Stadium
Attendance: 14,823
Referee: Lee Sang-yong

2005 League Cup
13 April 2005
19:00

FC Seoul	1–0	Suwon Samsung Bluewings
Ricardo Nascimento 58' (pen.)	Report

Seoul World Cup Stadium
Attendance: 30,143
Referee: Choi Kwang-bo

2006 League Cup
26 July 2006
19:00

Suwon Samsung Bluewings	1–1	FC Seoul
Olivera 71'	Report	Chun Je-hun 84'

Suwon World Cup Stadium
Attendance: 22,365
Referee: Lee Young-chul

2007 League Cup Group B
21 March 2007
20:00

FC Seoul	4–1	Suwon Samsung Bluewings
Park Chu-young 13', 51', 52'; Jung Jo-gook 87'	Report	Mato 6'

Seoul World Cup Stadium
Attendance: 35,993
Referee: Ko Kum-bok
2007 League Cup Group B
2 May 2007
19:00

Suwon Samsung Bluewings	3–1	FC Seoul
Kwak Hee-ju 47'; Kim Dae-eui 62'; Baek Ji-hoon 67'	Report	Kim Eun-Jung 74'

Suwon World Cup Stadium
Attendance: 28,713
Referee: Choi Kwang-bo

2008 League Cup Group A
2 April 2008
20:00

FC Seoul	0–2	Suwon Samsung Bluewings
	Report	Seo Dong-hyeon 77'; Cho Yong-tae 90+3'

Seoul World Cup Stadium
Attendance: 23,528
Referee: Hong Jin-ho
2008 League Cup Group A
2 July 2008
19:30

Suwon Samsung Bluewings	0–1	FC Seoul
	Report	Lee Seung-yeoul 45+3'

Suwon World Cup Stadium
Attendance: 23,724
Referee: Choi Myung-yong

2010 League Cup Semi-finals
28 July 2010
20:00

FC Seoul	4–2 (a.e.t.)	Suwon Samsung Bluewings
Damjanović 57', 110'; Lee Seung-yeoul 82', 115'	Report	Kim Jin-kyu 62' (o.g.); Yeom Ki-hun 72'

Seoul World Cup Stadium
Attendance: 21,036
Referee: Choi Myung-yong

=== FA Cup matches ===
1997 FA Cup Quarter-finals
25 November 1997

Anyang LG Cheetahs	2–2 (a.e.t.)	Suwon Samsung Bluewings
Seo Jung-won 1'; Kim Jong-yeon 56'	Report	Cho Hyun-doo 34'; Olăroi 38'
Penalties
Oleg (penalty scored); Seo Jung-won (penalty missed); Mutamba (penalty missed); Kim Dae-sung (penalty scored); Kim Bong-soo (penalty scored)	3–2	(penalty missed) Laktionov; (penalty scored) Olăroiu; (penalty missed) Lee Ki-hyung; (penalty scored) Cho Hyun-doo; (penalty missed) Lee Byung-keun

Gwangju Mudeung Stadium

2006 FA Cup Quarter-finals
12 August 2006
19:00

FC Seoul	2–2	Suwon Samsung Bluewings
Park Chu-young 67'; Dudu 77'	Report	Silva 52'; Mato 88'
Penalties
Kim Eun-jung (penalty scored); Dudu (penalty scored); Lee Ki-hyung (penalty missed); Lee Eul-yong (penalty scored); Park Chu-young (penalty scored); Lee Min-sung (penalty scored); Kim Chi-gon (penalty missed)	5–6	(penalty scored) Mato; (penalty missed) Silva; (penalty scored) Olivera; (penalty scored) Song Chong-gug; (penalty scored) Kim Nam-il; (penalty scored) Lee Sa-vik; (penalty scored) Cho Won-hee

Seoul World Cup Stadium
Attendance: 38,533

2007 FA Cup Round of 16
1 August 2007
20:00

FC Seoul	0–0	Suwon Samsung Bluewings
	Report
Penalties
Choi Won-kwon (penalty scored); Dudu (penalty scored); Sim Woo-yeon (penalty scored); Lee Eul-yong (penalty missed); Ricardo Nascimento (penalty scored)	4–2	(penalty missed) Mato; (penalty scored) Hong Soon-hak; (penalty missed) Kwak Hee-ju; (penalty scored) Yang Sang-min

Seoul World Cup Stadium
Attendance: 31,459

2012 FA Cup Round of 16
20 June 2012
19:30

FC Seoul	0–2	Suwon Samsung Bluewings
	Report	Kim Ju-young 40' (o.g.); Stevo 53'

Seoul World Cup Stadium
Attendance: 14,853
Referee: Yoo Seon-ho

2016 FA Cup Final (first leg)
27 November 2016
14:00

Suwon Samsung Bluewings	2–1	FC Seoul
Johnathan 15'; Yeom Ki-hun 58'	Report	Ju Se-jong 50'

Suwon World Cup Stadium
Attendance: 31,034
Referee: Lee Dong-jun
2016 FA Cup Final (second leg)
3 December 2016
13:30

FC Seoul	2–1 (a.e.t.)	Suwon Samsung Bluewings
Adriano 75'; Yoon Seung-won 90+3'	Report	Johnathan 55'
Penalties
Kwak Tae-hwi (penalty scored); Go Yo-han (penalty scored); Osmar (penalty scored); Ju Se-jong (penalty scored); Adriano (penalty scored); Lee Seok-hyun (penalty scored); Ko Kwang-min (penalty scored); Cho Chan-ho (penalty scored); Yoon Seung-won (penalty scored); Yu Sang-hun (penalty missed)	9–10	Santos (penalty scored); Yang Sang-min (penalty scored); Cho Won-hee (penalty scored); Cho Dong-geon (penalty scored); Yeom Ki-hun (penalty scored); Kwak Kwang-seon (penalty scored); Hong Chul (penalty scored); Koo Ja-ryong (penalty scored); Jang Ho-ik (penalty scored); Yang Hyung-mo (penalty scored)

Seoul World Cup Stadium
Attendance: 35,037
Referee: Kim Sung-ho

=== Super Cup matches ===
1999 Super Cup
20 March 1999

Suwon Samsung Bluewings	5–1	Anyang LG Cheetahs
Parakhnevych 11'; Drakulić 24', 87', 90'; Shin Hong-gi 76' (pen.)		Baek Hyung-jin 45'

Suwon Stadium
Attendance: 15,077

=== AFC Champions League matches ===
2001–02 Asian Club Championship Quarter-finals
17 February 2002

Suwon Samsung Bluewings	0–0	Anyang LG Cheetahs

Jeju World Cup Stadium
2001–02 Asian Club Championship Final
5 April 2002

Suwon Samsung Bluewings	0–0 (a.e.t.)	Anyang LG Cheetahs
Penalties
Lee Ki-hyung (penalty scored); Ko Chang-hyun (penalty missed); Alen (penalty scored); Cho Byung-kuk (penalty scored); Sandro (penalty scored)	4–2	(penalty missed) Park Yo-seb; (penalty scored) Marcos; (penalty missed) Kim Sung-il; (penalty scored) Lee Young-pyo

Azadi Stadium

== Records and statistics ==
- As of 25 November 2023.
- Penalty shoot-outs results are counted as a drawn match.

=== All-time results ===
Competition	Played	Seoul wins	Draws	Suwon wins	Seoul goals	Suwon goals
K League 1	85	36	19	30	100	105
Korean League Cup	18	6	6	6	27	27
Korea Cup	6	1	3	2	7	9
Korean Super Cup	1	0	0	1	1	5
AFC Champions League	2	0	2	0	0	0
Total	112	43	30	39	135	146

=== Top goalscorers ===
No.	Player	Team	K League 1	League Cup	FA Cup	Total
1	(South Korea) Park Chu-young	FC Seoul	6	3	1	10
2	(Montenegro) Dejan Damjanović	Both teams	7	2	0	9
3	(Australia) Adam Taggart	Suwon Samsung Bluewings	6	0	0	6
3	(South Korea) Jung Jo-gook	FC Seoul	5	1	0	6
3	(South Korea) Yeom Ki-hun	Suwon Samsung Bluewings	4	1	1	6
3	(South Korea) Seo Jung-won	Both teams	3	2	1	6
3	(South Korea) Jung Kwang-min	FC Seoul	2	4	0	6
3	(South Korea) Park Kun-ha	Suwon Samsung Bluewings	2	4	0	6
9	(South Korea) Yun Ju-tae	FC Seoul	5	0	0	5
9	(South Korea) Lee Sang-ho	Both teams	5	0	0	5
9	(Brazil) Adriano	FC Seoul	4	0	1	5
9	(South Korea) Choi Yong-soo	FC Seoul	3	2	0	5

- Goals against both teams
  - (South Korea) Seo Jung-won (3 goals against Suwon, 3 goals against Seoul)
  - (South Korea) Lee Sang-ho (4 goals against Seoul, 1 goal against Suwon)
  - (Montenegro) Dejan Damjanović (7 goals against Suwon, 2 goals against Seoul)

=== Largest victories ===
Date	Competition	Result	Venue
20 March 1999	Super Cup	Suwon 5–1 Anyang	Suwon Stadium
18 April 2015	K League Classic	Suwon 5–1 Seoul	Suwon World Cup Stadium
21 July 1999	K League	Anyang 0–4 Suwon	Changwon Civic Stadium
13 November 2002	K League	Suwon 4–1 Anyang	Suwon World Cup Stadium
21 March 2007	League Cup	Seoul 4–1 Suwon	Seoul World Cup Stadium
14 July 2002	K League	Anyang 3–0 Suwon	Anyang Stadium
23 October 2005	K League	Suwon 0–3 Seoul	Suwon World Cup Stadium
19 September 2015	K League Classic	Suwon 0–3 Seoul	Suwon World Cup Stadium

=== Highest attendances ===
No.	Date	Competition	Attendance	Venue	Result
1	8 April 2007	K League	55,397	Seoul World Cup Stadium	Seoul 0–1 Suwon
2	6 March 2011	K League	51,606	Seoul World Cup Stadium	Seoul 0–2 Suwon
3	8 August 2012	K League	50,787	Seoul World Cup Stadium	Seoul 0–2 Suwon
4	4 April 2010	K League	48,558	Seoul World Cup Stadium	Seoul 3–1 Suwon
5	18 June 2016	K League Classic	47,899	Seoul World Cup Stadium	Seoul 1–1 Suwon
6	13 July 2014	K League Classic	46,549	Seoul World Cup Stadium	Seoul 2–0 Suwon
7	1 April 2012	K League	45,192	Suwon World Cup Stadium	Suwon 2–0 Suwon
8	3 October 2011	K League	44,537	Suwon World Cup Stadium	Suwon 1–0 Seoul
9	13 April 2008	K League	44,239	Seoul World Cup Stadium	Seoul 0–2 Suwon
10	3 August 2013	K League Classic	43,681	Seoul World Cup Stadium	Seoul 2–1 Suwon

== Honours ==
Seoul	Competition	Suwon
International
0	AFC Champions League	2
0	Asian Super Cup (defunct)	2
Domestic
7	K League 1	4
0	K League 2	1
2	League Cup (defunct)	6
2	Korea Cup	5
1	K League Super Cup	3
12	Aggregate	23
