= 2001 Korean FA Cup =

2001 Seoul Bank FA Cup

Tournament details
- Country: South Korea

Final positions
- Champions: Daejeon Citizen (1st title)
- Runners-up: Pohang Steelers

Tournament statistics
- Top goal scorer(s): Kim Eun-jung; Choi Sung-kuk (4 goals each)

Awards
- Best player: Kim Eun-jung

The 2001 Korean FA Cup, known as the 2001 Seoul Bank FA Cup, was the sixth edition of the Korean FA Cup.

== Qualifying round ==
=== First round ===
October 6	Pohang City	2–1	Hansung University	Gimcheon Stadium
	Yang Chun-heon 32'; Yoo Heung-il 82'		Sim Seong-bo 18'

October 6	Hyundai Mipo Dockyard	2–0	Kangwon Tourism College	Daegu World Cup Stadium Subfield
	Lee Seong-rak 22'; Min Yeong-gi 34'

October 6	Kwandong University	6–1	Masan City	Daegu World Cup Stadium Subfield
	Son Jeong-u 19'; Jeong Jin-haeng 45', 80'; Jang Byeong-il 60'; Choi Jin-uk 83'		An Seong-ho 3' (o.g.); Hwang Jeong-gyu 62'

October 6	Dong-A University	1–1 (a.e.t.) (3–2 p)	Hongik University	Daegu Suseong Gumin Stadium
	Yun Ju-il 67'		Lee Jin-seok 43'

October 6	Ulsan Sejong Industry	1–4	Kwangwoon University	Daegu Suseong Gumin Stadium
	Geum Deuk-yong 80'		Hong Bok-pyo 18', 59'; Kim Tae-su 37' (pen.), 41'

October 7	Korea Railroad	2–1	Kyung Hee University	Daegu World Cup Stadium Subfield
	Heo Se-gyu 44'; Lee Sun-haeng 90'		Lee Jun-young 72'

October 7	Yonsei University	3–2	Kunjang College	Daegu World Cup Stadium Subfield
	Lee Jae-hak 46'; Kim Dong-kyu 85'; Sin Dong-geun 90'		Han Seong-dae 57' (pen.); Jang Jae-ho 61'

October 7	Gwangju Samsung Electronics	1–3	Konkuk University	Daegu Suseong Gumin Stadium
	Jo Byeong-gwan 71'		Ju Hyeong-cheol 33', 54' (pen.); Jo Yong-hyeon 85'

October 7	Seoul City	3–1	Myongji University	Daegu Suseong Gumin Stadium
	Je Yong-sam 7'; Kim Ju-yeong 16', 26'		Jeong Han-geo 73'

October 7	Kyungil University	0–2	Sangmu FC	Gimcheon Stadium
			Park Jin-seop 24' (pen.); Song Heung-seop 41'

October 7	Samik Musical Instruments	0–1	Hannam University	Gimcheon Stadium
			Lee Dae-hue 85'

October 7	Jeonbuk National University	1–0	Ulsan Donggu	Gimcheon Stadium Subfield
	Lee Jeong-uk 90+'

October 7	Daegu University	1–4	Korea University	Gimcheon Stadium Subfield
	Kim Yong-sik 90'		Choi Sung-kuk 52'; Kim Young-sam 58'; Cha Du-ri 69'; Lee Jin-u 76'

October 8	Soongsil University	2–2 (a.e.t.) (5–4 p)	Kookmin Bank	Gimcheon Stadium
	Park Jong-woo 27'; Ko Ki-gu 46'		Baek Seung-u 70', 90'

October 8	University of Ulsan	4–2	Gwangju FC	Gimcheon Stadium
	Byun Sung-hwan 43' (pen.); Chung Kyung-ho 51'; Lim Jin-yeong 75', 88'		Hwang In-seong 47'; Seon Hui-gyu 66'

October 8	Jeonju University	2–3	Gangneung City	Gimcheon Stadium Subfield
	Park Jin-man 55', 67'		Park Hyo-jin 17'; Jeong Sang-mo 28', 87'

October 8	Yong In University	0–3	Pohang City	Gimcheon Stadium Subfield
			Yang Chun-heon 40'; Lee Seong-cheon 49', 63'

== Final rounds ==
=== Bracket ===
Round of 16
Jeonbuk Hyundai Motors	1
Sangmu FC	0
Jeonnam Dragons	0 (4)
Korea Railroad (p)	0 (5)
Anyang LG Cheetahs	3
University of Ulsan	0
Daejeon Citizen	2
Gangneung City	1
Pohang Steelers	3
Hannam University	0
Busan I'Cons	4
Seoul City	2
Seongnam Ilhwa Chunma	3
Korea University	1
Bucheon SK	1
Ulsan Hyundai Horang-i (a.e.t.)	2

Quarter-finals
Jeonbuk Hyundai Motors	2
Korea Railroad	1
Anyang LG Cheetahs	1
Daejeon Citizen	2
Pohang Steelers	3
Busan I'Cons	2
Seongnam Ilhwa Chunma	0
Ulsan Hyundai Horang-i	2

Semi-finals
Jeonbuk Hyundai Motors	1 (3)
Daejeon Citizen (p)	1 (4)
Pohang Steelers (a.e.t.)	2
Ulsan Hyundai Horang-i	1

Final
Daejeon Citizen	1
Pohang Steelers	0

=== Second round ===
Six clubs won by default: Jeonbuk Hyundai Motors, Seongnam Ilhwa Chunma, Anyang LG Cheetahs, Daejeon Citizen, Pohang Steelers and Busan I'Cons.

October 30	Pohang City	1–3	University of Ulsan	Namhae Stadium
	Lee Seong-cheon 72'		Sung Jong-hyun 34'; Lim Jin-yeong 51'; Kim Dong-hwan 87'

October 30	Dong-A University	0–1	Gangneung City	Namhae Stadium
			Jeong Sang-mo 18'

October 30	Sangmu FC	2–0	Yonsei University	Daegu Civil Stadium
	Kim Hae-chul 34'; Han Jong-seong 38'

October 30	Korea University	7–3	Kwandong University	Daegu Civil Stadium
	Cha Du-ri 9'; Choi Sung-kuk 17' (pen.), 22', 79'; Kim Jung-woo 70'; Lee Chun-soo 82', 84'		Sim Seong-seok 44'; Jeong Jin-haeng 49'; Son Jeong-u 58'

October 31	Hannam University	3–1	Kwangwoon University	Daegu Civil Stadium
	Sin Chung-hue 3'; Lee Dae-hue 56'; Nam Yeong-il 81' (pen.)		Park Dae-dong 11'

October 31	Seoul City	2–2 (a.e.t.) (5–3 p)	Soongsil University	Daegu Civil Stadium
	Yoo Jin-o 8'; Yoo Yeong-mu 33'		Ko Ki-gu 21'; Do Hwa-sung 54'

October 31	Jeonnam Dragons	2–0	Konkuk University	Gwang-yang Stadium
	Tico Mineiro 74', 87' (pen.)

October 31	Suwon Samsung Bluewings	0–2	Korea Railroad	Suwon World Cup Stadium
			Kim Eun-cheol 29'; Park Han-seok 37'

October 31	Bucheon SK	1–0	Jeonbuk National University	Bucheon Leports Complex
	Lee Sang-yoon 69'

October 31	Ulsan Hyundai Horang-i	3–2 (a.e.t.)	Hyundai Mipo Dockyard	Ulsan Sports Complex
	Jang Cheol-min 49'; Kim Hyun-seok 63'; Son Sang-ho 111'		Lee Seong-rak 8'; Kim Yeong-gi 90+'

=== Round of 16 ===
November 3	Daejeon Citizen	2–1	Gangneung City	Daejeon Sports Complex
	Kim Eun-jung 13'; Coly 91'		Kim Gi-beom 54'

November 3	Seongnam Ilhwa Chunma	3–1	Korea University	Seongnam 1 Stadium
	Drakulić 6', 68'; Cho Jin-ho 66'		Min Gyeong-in 23'

November 4	Jeonbuk Hyundai Motors	1–0	Sangmu FC	Jeonju Stadium
	Oh Gwang-hun 13'

November 4	Jeonnam Dragons	0–0 (a.e.t.) (4–5 p)	Korea Railroad	Gwangyang Stadium

November 4	Anyang LG Cheetahs	3–0	University of Ulsan	Mokdong Stadium
	Han Jung-hwa 9'; André 67' (pen.); Park Jung-hwan 76'

November 4	Pohang Steelers	3–0	Hannam University	Steelyard
	Kim Eun-seok 35'; Milaimović 64'; Yun Bo-yeong 85'

November 4	Busan I'Cons	4–2	Seoul City	Busan Gudeok stadium
	Lee Jang-gwan 19'; Jeon Woo-keun 28'; Kim Gi-jong 53'; Shaka 63'		Song Yu-chan 39'; Kim Ju-yeong 83'

November 4	Bucheon SK	1–2 (a.e.t.)	Ulsan Hyundai Horang-i	Bucheon Leports Complex
	Jeong Pil-seok 87'		Cleber Arildo 83'; Lee Kil-yong 116'

=== Quarter-finals ===
November 15	Jeonbuk Hyundai Motors	2–1	Korea Railroad	Jeonju World Cup Stadium
	Kim Do-hoon 5'; Rogerio Prateat 84'		Lee Jong-muk 61' (pen.)

November 15	Anyang LG Cheetahs	1–2	Daejeon Citizen	Mokdong Stadium
	An Seong-hun 42'		Kim Eun-jung 21'; Jeong Yeong-hun 28'

November 15	Busan I'Cons	2–3	Pohang Steelers	Busan Gudeok stadium
	Shaka 14'; Jeon Woo-keun 49'		Petreski 6'; Yun Bo-yeong 63'; Kim Sang-rok 90'

November 15	Seongnam Ilhwa Chunma	0–2	Ulsan Hyundai Horang-i	Seongnam 1 Stadium
			Jang Cheol-min 2'; Park Kyu-seon 83'

=== Semi-finals ===
November 18	Jeonbuk Hyundai Motors	1–1 (a.e.t.) (3–4 p)	Daejeon Citizen	Bucheon Leports Complex
	Choi Jin-cheul 22'		Kim Eun-jung 73'

November 18	Pohang Steelers	2–1 (a.e.t.)	Ulsan Hyundai Horang-i	Bucheon Leports Complex
	Lee Dong-gook 8'; Yun Bo-yeong 99' (pen.)		Lee Kil-yong 79'

=== Final ===
November 25	Daejeon Citizen	1–0	Pohang Steelers	Seoul World Cup Stadium
	Kim Eun-jung 53'

== Awards ==
Award	Winner	Team
Most Valuable Player	(South Korea) Kim Eun-jung	Daejeon Citizen
Top goalscorer	(South Korea) Kim Eun-jung	Daejeon Citizen
Top goalscorer	(South Korea) Choi Sung-kuk	Korea University

== See also ==
- 2001 in South Korean football
- 2001 K League
- 2001 Korean League Cup
