= 2004 A3 Champions Cup =

A3 Nissan Cup 2004

Tournament details
- Host country: China
- Dates: 22 – 28 February
- Teams: 4 (from 1 confederation)
- Venue: 1 (in 1 host city)

Final positions
- Champions: (South Korea) Seongnam Ilhwa Chunma (1st title)
- Runners-up: (Japan) Yokohama F. Marinos
- Third place: (China) Shanghai Shenhua
- Fourth place: (China) Shanghai International

Tournament statistics
- Matches played: 6
- Goals scored: 13 (2.17 per match)
- Top scorer(s): (South Korea) Kim Do-Hoon (Seongnam Ilhwa, 2 goals)
- Best player(s): (South Korea) Kim Do-Hoon (Seongnam Ilhwa)

The 2004 A3 Champions Cup was second edition of A3 Champions Cup. It was held from February 22 to 28, 2003 in Shanghai, China PR.

== Participants ==
- (China) Shanghai Shenhua – 2003 Chinese Jia-A League Champions
- (China) Shanghai International – 2003 Chinese Jia-A League Runners-up
- (Japan) Yokohama F. Marinos – 2003 J. League Champions
- (South Korea) Seongnam Ilhwa Chunma – 2003 K-League Champions

== Group table ==
| Team | Pld | W | D | L | GF | GA | GD | Pts |
|---|---|---|---|---|---|---|---|---|
| (South Korea) Seongnam Ilhwa Chunma | 3 | 2 | 1 | 0 | 5 | 1 | +4 | 7 |
| (Japan) Yokohama F. Marinos | 3 | 2 | 0 | 1 | 4 | 4 | 0 | 6 |
| (China) Shanghai Shenhua | 3 | 0 | 2 | 1 | 2 | 4 | −2 | 2 |
| (China) Shanghai International | 3 | 0 | 1 | 2 | 2 | 4 | −2 | 1 |

=== Match Results ===
22 February 2004

| Yokohama F. Marinos (Japan) | 0 – 3 | (South Korea) Seongnam Ilhwa Chunma |
|---|---|---|
| | | Kim Do-Hoon 50'; Adhemar 63'; Shin Tae-Yong 82' |

Hongkou Football Stadium, Shanghai

22 February 2004

| Shanghai Shenhua (China) | 1 – 1 | (China) Shanghai International |
|---|---|---|
| Zheng Kewei 80' | | Ayew 44' |

Hongkou Football Stadium, Shanghai

25 February 2004

| Shanghai International (China) | 0 – 1 | (South Korea) Seongnam Ilhwa Chunma |
|---|---|---|
| | | Kim Do-Hoon 43' |

Hongkou Football Stadium, Shanghai

25 February 2004

| Shanghai Shenhua (China) | 0 – 2 | (Japan) Yokohama F. Marinos |
|---|---|---|
| | | Yasunaga 54'; Kurihara 85' |

Hongkou Football Stadium, Shanghai

28 February 2004

| Shanghai International (China) | 1 – 2 | (Japan) Yokohama F. Marinos |
|---|---|---|
| Zhan Keqiang 23' | | Matsuda 55'; Kubo 60' |

Hongkou Football Stadium, Shanghai

28 February 2004

| Shanghai Shenhua (China) | 1 – 1 | (South Korea) Seongnam Ilhwa Chunma |
|---|---|---|
| Petković 45' | | Harry Castillo 11' |

Hongkou Football Stadium, Shanghai

== Awards ==
=== Winners ===
A3 Champions Cup 2004 Winners

Seongnam Ilhwa Chunma
First title

=== Individual awards ===
| Top Goalscorers | Most Valuable Player |
|---|---|
| (South Korea) Kim Do-Hoon (Seongnam Ilhwa) | (South Korea) Kim Do-Hoon (Seongnam Ilhwa) |

== Goalscorers ==
| Pos | Player | Team | Goals |
|---|---|---|---|
| 1 | (South Korea) Kim Do-Hoon | (South Korea) Seongnam Ilhwa Chunma | 2 |
| 2 | (Brazil) Adhemar | (South Korea) Seongnam Ilhwa Chunma | 1 |
| 2 | (Colombia) Harry Castillo | (South Korea) Seongnam Ilhwa Chunma | 1 |
| 2 | (South Korea) Shin Tae-Yong | (South Korea) Seongnam Ilhwa Chunma | 1 |
| 2 | (Ghana) Kwame Ayew | (China) Shanghai International | 1 |
| 2 | (China) Zhan Keqiang | (China) Shanghai International | 1 |
| 2 | (Serbia and Montenegro) Dejan Petković | (China) Shanghai Shenhua | 1 |
| 2 | (China) Zheng Kewei | (China) Shanghai Shenhua | 1 |
| 2 | (Japan) Tatsuhiko Kubo | (Japan) Yokohama F. Marinos | 1 |
| 2 | (Japan) Yuzo Kurihara | (Japan) Yokohama F. Marinos | 1 |
| 2 | (Japan) Naoki Matsuda | (Japan) Yokohama F. Marinos | 1 |
| 2 | (Japan) Sotaro Yasunaga | (Japan) Yokohama F. Marinos | 1 |
