= List of Yokohama F. Marinos records and statistics =

This article contains records and statistics for the Japanese professional football club, Yokohama F. Marinos.

== J.League ==
Year	League	Place	GP	Pts	Win	Draw	Lose	Average Crowd
1993	J1 1st stage	3 / 10	18	-	11	-	7	16,781
1993	J1 2nd stage	3 / 10	18	-	10	-	8	16,781
1993	J1 Total	4 / 10	36	-	21	-	15	16,781
1994	J1 1st stage	9 / 12	22	-	8	-	14	19,801
1994	J1 2nd stage	3 / 12	22	-	14	-	8	19,801
1994	J1 Total	6 / 12	44	-	22	-	22	19,801
1995	J1 1st stage	Champions / 14	26	52	17	-	9	18,326
1995	J1 2nd stage	3 / 14	26	46	15	-	11	18,326
1995	J1 Total	Champions / 14	52	98	32	-	20	18,326
1996	J1	3 / 16	30	63	21	-	9	14,589
1997	J1 1st stage	5 / 17	16	28	11	-	5	9,211
1997	J1 2nd stage	3 / 17	16	32	12	-	4	9,211
1997	J1 Total	3 / 17	32	60	23	-	9	9,211
1998	J1 1st stage	4 / 18	17	32	11	-	6	19,165
1998	J1 2nd stage	4 / 18	17	32	11	-	6	19,165
1998	J1 Total	4 / 18	34	64	22	-	12	19,165
1999	J1 1st stage	7 / 16	15	23	8	1	6	20,095
1999	J1 2nd stage	3 / 16	15	30	10	2	3	20,095
1999	J1 Total	5 / 16	30	53	18	3	9	20,095
2000	J1 1st stage	Champions / 16	15	30	10	0	5	16,644
2000	J1 2nd stage	5 / 16	15	24	8	1	6	16,644
2000	J1 Total	Runners-up / 16	30	54	18	1	11	16,644
2001	J1 1st stage	15 / 16	15	11	3	2	10	20,595
2001	J1 2nd stage	10 / 16	15	19	6	3	6	20,595
2001	J1 Total	13 / 16	30	30	9	5	16	20,595
2002	J1 1st stage	Runners-up / 16	15	33	11	3	1	24,108
2002	J1 2nd stage	6 / 16	15	22	8	1	6	24,108
2002	J1 Total	Runners-up / 16	30	55	19	4	7	24,108
2003	J1 1st stage	Champions / 16	15	32	10	2	3	24,957
2003	J1 2nd stage	Champions / 16	15	26	7	5	3	24,957
2003	J1 Total	Champions / 16	30	58	17	7	6	24,957
2004	J1 1st stage	Champions / 16	15	36	11	3	1	24,818
2004	J1 2nd stage	6 / 16	15	23	6	5	4	24,818
2004	J1 Total	Champions / 16	30	59	17	8	5	24,818
2005	J1	9 / 18	34	48	12	12	10	25,713
2006	J1	9 / 18	34	45	13	6	15	23,663
2007	J1	7 / 18	34	50	14	8	12	24,039
2008	J1	9 / 18	34	48	13	9	12	23,682
2009	J1	10 / 18	34	46	11	13	10	22,057
2010	J1	8 / 18	34	51	15	6	13	25,684
2011	J1	5 / 18	34	56	16	8	10	21,038
2012	J1	4 / 18	34	53	13	14	7	22,946
2013	J1	2 / 18	34	62	18	8	8	27,496

== Domestic cup competitions ==
Year	Emperor's Cup	J. League Cup	Super Cup
1992	Champions	Group Stage	-
1993	Quarter-finals	Group Stage	-
1994	Semi-finals	Semi-finals	-
1995	2nd Round	Not Held	Runners-up
1996	3rd Round	Group Stage	-
1997	4th Round	Group Stage	-
1998	3rd Round	Group Stage	-
1999	Quarter-finals	Quarter-finals	-
2000	Quarter-finals	Quarter-finals	-
2001	3rd Round	Champions	-
2002	4th Round	Group Stage	-
2003	Quarter-finals	Quarter-finals	-
2004	5th Round	Quarter-finals	Runners-up
2005	5th Round	Semi-finals	Runners-up
2006	Quarter-finals	Semi-finals	-
2007	5th Round	Semi-finals	-
2008	Semi-finals	Quarter-finals	-
2009	4th Round	Semi-finals	-
2010	4th Round	Group Stage	-
2011	Semi-finals	Quarter-finals	-
2012	Semi-finals	Group Stage	-
2013	Champions	Semi-finals	-

== Major International Competitions ==
Season	Competition	Result	Average Crowd
1992-93	Asian Cup Winners Cup	Champions	?
1996-97	Asian Club Championship	Quarter-finals	?
2004	A3 Champions Cup	Runners-up	-
2004	AFC Champions League	Round 1	?
2005	A3 Champions Cup	3rd	-
2005	AFC Champions League	Round 1	?

== Top scorers by season ==
Season	Player	Domestic league	Ref
2010	(Japan) Kazuma Watanabe	8	
