= Kim Do-hoon =

South Korean footballer and manager

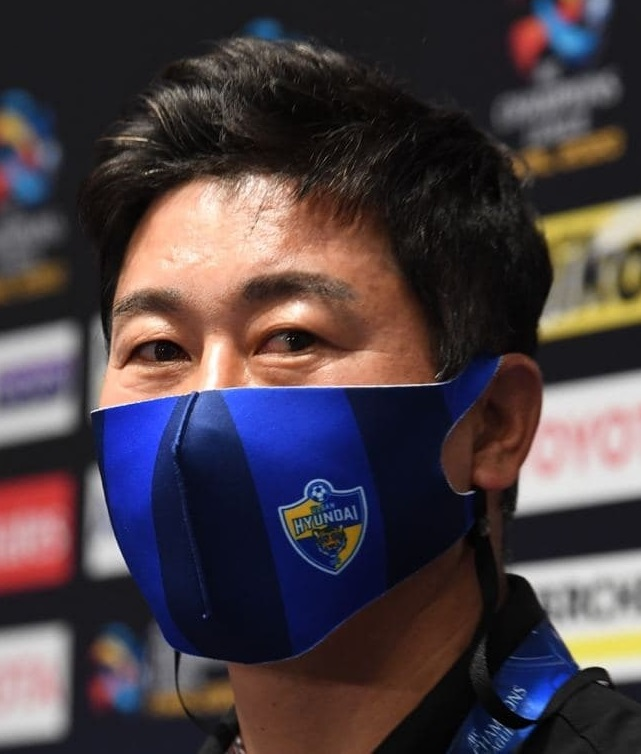
- Kim in 2020

Personal information
- Date of birth: 21 July 1970 (age 56)
- Place of birth: Tongyeong, Gyeongnam, South Korea
- Height: 1.83 m (6 ft 0 in)
- Position: Striker

College career
Years	Team	Apps	(Gls)
1989–1992	Yonsei University		

Senior career*
Years	Team	Apps	(Gls)
1993–1994	Sangmu FC (draft)	36	(12)
1995–2002	Jeonbuk Hyundai Motors	122	(44)
1998–1999	→ Vissel Kobe (loan)	58	(26)
2003–2005	Seongnam Ilhwa Chunma	84	(42)
Total		300	(124)

International career
1990–2000	South Korea U23	8 (Note: Includes three appearances against non-national team, and four appearances and one goal as an overage player (three appearances in Summer Olympics, one appearance and one goal in friendlies).)	(2)
1993-1996	South Korea B	14	(4)
1994–2003	South Korea	72	(30)

Managerial career
- 2006–2012: Seongnam Ilhwa Chunma (assistant)
- 2014–2015: South Korea U20 (assistant)
- 2015–2016: Incheon United
- 2016–2020: Ulsan Hyundai
- 2021–2022: Lion City Sailors
- 2023–2024: South Korea (caretaker)
Medal record
Men's football
Representing South Korea
Summer Universiade
Silver medal – second place	1993 Buffalo
EAFF Championship
Winner	2003 Japan
East Asian Games
Gold medal – first place	1993 Shanghai
- * Club domestic league appearances and goals

- Kim Do-hoon
- Hangul: 김도훈
- RR: Gim Dohun
- MR: Kim Tohun

Kim Do-hoon (Korean: 김도훈; born 21 July 1970) is a South Korean professional football manager and former player. He played for the South Korean national team at the 1998 FIFA World Cup in France.

== Club career ==
Kim played as a striker for Jeonbuk Hyundai Motors, Seongnam Ilhwa Chunma and Japanese club Vissel Kobe during his professional career. He is the top goalscorer at the 2004 AFC Champions League, and the third player to win the K League Top Scorer Award twice.

== International career ==
On 13 September 1994, Kim scored his first international goal against Ukraine in a 2–0 friendly win.

On 28 March 1999, Kim scored the only goal in a 1–0 friendly win over Brazil. As a result of his goal, South Korea became the first Asian nation to defeat Brazil.

On 29 September 2003, Kim scored his first international hat-trick in a 16–0 thrashing victory against Nepal during the 2004 AFC Asian Cup qualifiers. On 24 October 2003, he would then scored his second hat-trick in the reverse fixtures against the same opponent in a 7–0 win.

== Coaching career ==
Kim became the assistant coach of Seongnam Ilhwa Chunma under manager Kim Hak-bum straight after retiring as a player in 2005. He performed the role of assistant coach at Seongnam until Hak-bum's successor, Shin Tae-yong, left from the club in 2012. He helped Seongnam win the 2006 K League, the 2010 AFC Champions League and the 2011 Korean FA Cup while spending his coaching career at Seongnam.

Kim worked as a coach at Gangwon FC with his mentor Hak-bum and assistant coach Kim Hyung-yul in 2013. After leaving from Gangwon with them, Kim was appointed as the assistant coach of South Korea national under-20 team by Korea Football Association (KFA) in 2014.

== Managerial career ==
=== Incheon United ===
On 13 January 2015, Kim was appointed the manager of Incheon United. He made his managerial debut in a 1–1 draw with FC Seoul on 12 April. During his first season as a manager, Incheon reached the Korean FA Cup final for the first time in their history. However, he resigned from his post on 31 August 2016 due to his poor results until the middle of his second season.

=== Ulsan Hyundai ===
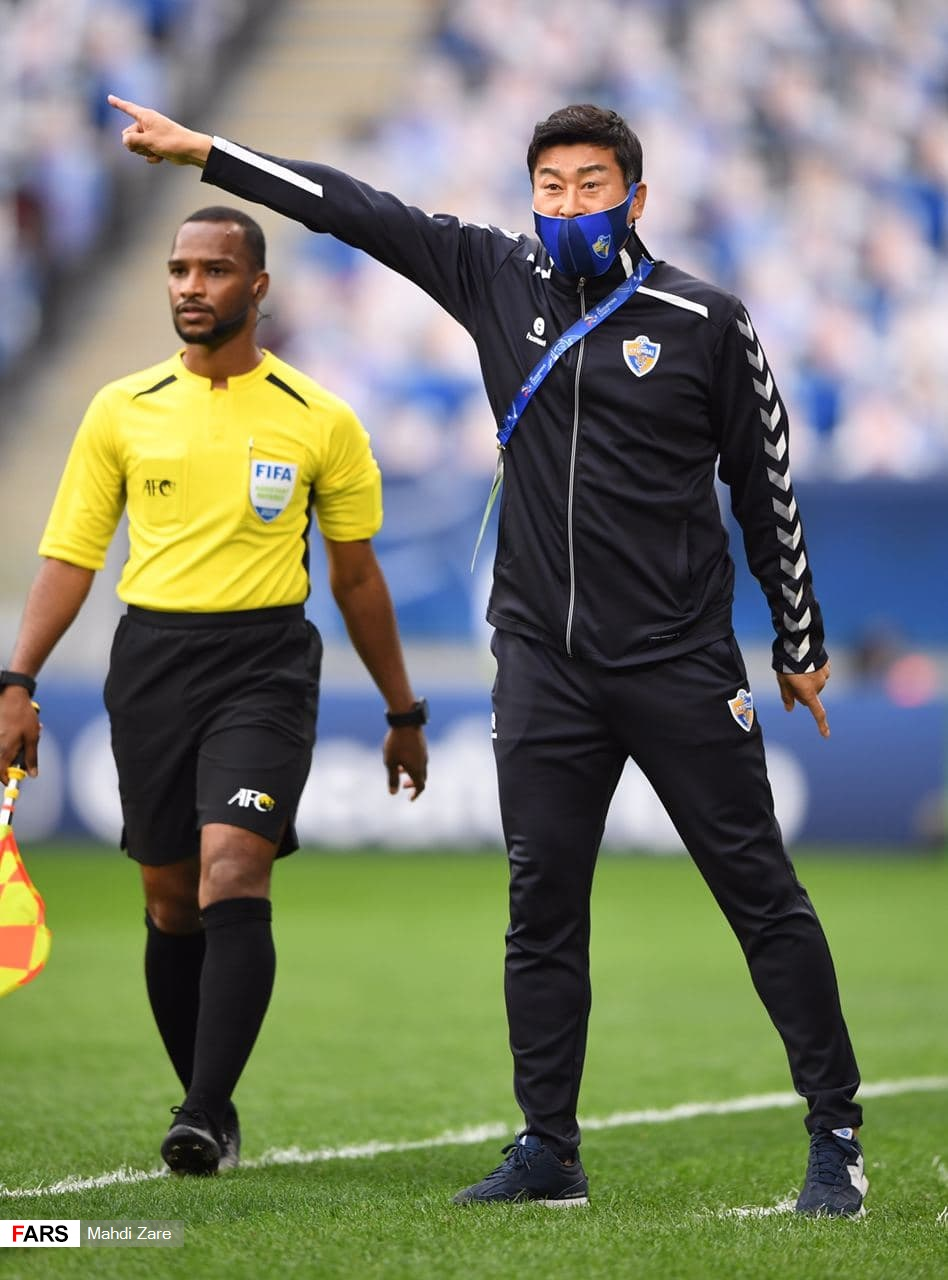
Kim managing Ulsan Hyundai in the 2020 AFC Champions League final.

On 21 November 2016, Ulsan Hyundai appointed Kim as their manager. He guided Ulsan to their first FA Cup title and second Champions League title in their history, winning the 2017 Korean FA Cup and the 2020 AFC Champions League. Despite these outcomes, he resigned from the club just after winning the Champions League to take responsibility for failing to bring a K League 1 title for four years.

=== Lion City Sailors ===
On 18 May 2021, Kim was appointed to manage Singapore Premier League club Lion City Sailors on a two-and-a-half-year contract. During his maiden season, he led the Sailors to win the 2021 Singapore Premier League title. He also guided the Sailors to win the 2022 Singapore Community Shield in his second season in charge.

On 24 July 2022, he headbutted Tampines Rovers assistant coach Mustafic Fahrudin near the end of a game. On 11 August 2022, Kim resigned after he received a three-match suspension for his forceful outburst.

=== South Korea ===
On 20 May 2024, Kim was appointed the caretaker manager of South Korea national team by KFA for the 2026 FIFA World Cup qualifiers in June against Singapore and China.

== Career statistics ==
=== Club ===
Appearances and goals by club, season and competition
Club	Season	League			National cup		League cup		Continental		Other		Total	
Club	Season	Division	Apps	Goals	Apps	Goals	Apps	Goals	Apps	Goals	Apps	Goals	Apps	Goals
Sangmu FC (draft)	1993	National Semipro League	?	?	? (Note: Appearance(s) in Korean National Championship, Korean President's Cup)	?	—		—		—		?	?
Sangmu FC (draft)	1994	National Semipro League	?	?	?	?	—		—		—		?	?
Sangmu FC (draft)	Total		?	?	?	?	—		—		—		?	?
Jeonbuk Hyundai Motors	1995	K League	18	6	—		7	3	—		—		25	9
Jeonbuk Hyundai Motors	1996	K League	16	6	? (Note: Appearance(s) in Korean FA Cup)	?	6	4	—		—		22	10
Jeonbuk Hyundai Motors	1997	K League	9	3	?	?	5	1	—		—		14	4
Jeonbuk Hyundai Motors	2000	K League	20	12	?	?	7	3	—		—		27	15
Jeonbuk Hyundai Motors	2001	K League	26	8	?	?	9	7	? (Note: Appearance(s) in Asian Cup Winners' Cup)	?	1 (Note: Appearance in Korean Super Cup)	0	36	15
Jeonbuk Hyundai Motors	2002	K League	22	8	?	?	8	2	?	?	—		30	10
Jeonbuk Hyundai Motors	Total		111	43	?	?	42	20	?	?	1	0	154	63
Vissel Kobe (loan)	1998	J1 League	33	17	2	2	0	0	—		—		35	19
Vissel Kobe (loan)	1999	J1 League	25	10	0	0	2	0	—		—		27	10
Vissel Kobe (loan)	Total		58	27	2	2	2	0	—		—		62	29
Seongnam Ilhwa Chunma	2003	K League	40	28	?	(3)	—		? (Note: Appearance(s) in AFC Champions League)	(3)	—		40	28
Seongnam Ilhwa Chunma	2004	K League	23	5	?	?	9	5	?	(9)	1	0	33	10
Seongnam Ilhwa Chunma	2005	K League	20	9	?	?	12	4	—		—		32	13
Seongnam Ilhwa Chunma	Total		83	42	?	?	21	9	?	?	1	0	105	51
Career total			252	112	2	2	65	29	?	?	2	0	321	143

=== International ===
Appearances and goals by national team and year
National team	Year	Apps	Goals
South Korea	1994	5	1
South Korea	1995	3	2
South Korea	1996	14	7
South Korea	1997	12	6
South Korea	1998	8	0
South Korea	1999	4	1
South Korea	2000	2	0
South Korea	2001	8	3
South Korea	2002	6	2
South Korea	2003	10	8
Career total		72	30

Results list South Korea's goal tally first.

List of international goals scored by Kim Do-hoon
No.	Date	Venue	Cap	Opponent	Score	Result	Competition
1	13 September 1994	Seoul, South Korea	1	Ukraine	1–0	2–0	Friendly
2	5 June 1995	Suwon, South Korea	6	Costa Rica	1–0	1–0	1995 Korea Cup
3	10 June 1995	Seoul, South Korea	7	Zambia	2–2	2–3	1995 Korea Cup
4	19 March 1996	Dubai, United Arab Emirates	10	United Arab Emirates	1–0	2–3	1996 Dubai Tournament
5	30 April 1996	Tel Aviv, Israel	13	Israel	1–0	5–4	Friendly
6	5 August 1996	Ho Chi Minh City, Vietnam	14	Guam	4–0	9–0	1996 AFC Asian Cup qualification
7	8 August 1996	Ho Chi Minh City, Vietnam	15	Chinese Taipei	2–0	4–0	1996 AFC Asian Cup qualification
8	23 November 1996	Suwon, South Korea	17	Colombia	3–1	4–1	Friendly
9	7 December 1996	Abu Dhabi, United Arad Emirates	20	Indonesia	1–0	4–2	1996 AFC Asian Cup
10	16 December 1996	Dubai, United Arab Emirates	22	Iran	1–0	2–6	1996 AFC Asian Cup
11	18 January 1997	Melbourne, Australia	23	Norway	1–0	1–0	1997 Opus Tournament
12	24 August 1997	Daegu, South Korea	28	Tajikistan	1–0	4–1	Friendly
13	24 August 1997	Daegu, South Korea	28	Tajikistan	3–1	4–1	Friendly
14	18 October 1997	Tashkent, Uzbekistan	32	Uzbekistan	5–1	5–1	1998 FIFA World Cup qualification
15	9 November 1997	Abu Dhabi, United Arad Emirates	34	United Arab Emirates	2–0	3–1	1998 FIFA World Cup qualification
16	9 November 1997	Abu Dhabi, United Arad Emirates	34	United Arab Emirates	3–1	3–1	1998 FIFA World Cup qualification
17	28 March 1999	Seoul, South Korea	43	Brazil	1–0	1–0	Friendly
18	24 January 2001	Hong Kong	49	Norway	2–2	2–3	2001 Lunar New Year Cup
19	24 April 2001	Cairo, Egypt	52	Iran	1–0	1–0	2001 LG Cup
20	16 September 2001	Busan, South Korea	55	Nigeria	1–0	2–1	Friendly
21	2 February 2002	Pasadena, United States	60	Canada	1–0	1–2	2002 CONCACAF Gold Cup
22	13 February 2002	Montevideo, Uruguay	61	Uruguay	1–1	1–2	Friendly
23	25 September 2003	Incheon, South Korea	63	Vietnam	3–0	5–0	2004 AFC Asian Cup qualification
24	29 September 2003	Incheon, South Korea	65	Nepal	12–0	16–0	2004 AFC Asian Cup qualification
25	29 September 2003	Incheon, South Korea	65	Nepal	14–0	16–0	2004 AFC Asian Cup qualification
26	29 September 2003	Incheon, South Korea	65	Nepal	15–0	16–0	2004 AFC Asian Cup qualification
27	24 October 2003	Muscat, Oman	68	Nepal	3–0	7–0	2004 AFC Asian Cup qualification
28	24 October 2003	Muscat, Oman	68	Nepal	4–0	7–0	2004 AFC Asian Cup qualification
29	24 October 2003	Muscat, Oman	68	Nepal	5–0	7–0	2004 AFC Asian Cup qualification
30	4 December 2003	Tokyo, Japan	70	Hong Kong	2–1	3–1	2003 EAFF Championship

== Managerial statistics ==
As of 11 June 2024

Managerial record by team and tenure
Team	From	To	Record					Ref.
Team	From	To	Pld	W	D	L	Win %	Ref.
Incheon United	13 January 2015	30 September 2016	71	26	19	26	36.62	
Ulsan Hyundai	21 November 2016	20 December 2020	193	106	48	39	54.92	
Lion City Sailors	21 May 2021	11 August 2022	36	22	8	6	61.11	
South Korea (caretaker)	20 May 2024	11 June 2024	2	2	0	0	100.00	
Career total			302	156	75	71	51.66	

== Honours ==
=== Player ===
Yonsei University

- Korean President's Cup: 1989

Sangmu FC

- Korean National Semipro League (Spring): 1994

Jeonbuk Hyundai Motors

- Korean FA Cup: 2000
- Asian Cup Winners' Cup runner-up: 2001–02

Seongnam Ilhwa Chunma

- K League 1: 2003
- Korean League Cup: 2004
- A3 Champions Cup: 2004
- AFC Champions League runner-up: 2004

South Korea B

- Summer Universiade silver medal: 1993
- East Asian Games: 1993

South Korea

- EAFF Championship: 2003

Individual

- Korean National Semipro League (Spring) top goalscorer: 1994
- K League All-Star: 1997, 2000, 2001, 2002, 2003, 2004, 2005
- K League 1 top goalscorer: 2000, 2003
- K League 1 Best XI: 2000, 2003
- Korean League Cup top goalscorer: 2001
- K League 1 Most Valuable Player: 2003
- A3 Champions Cup Most Valuable Player: 2004
- A3 Champions Cup top goalscorer: 2004
- AFC Champions League top goalscorer: 2004

=== Manager ===
Incheon United

- Korean FA Cup runner-up: 2015

Ulsan Hyundai

- Korean FA Cup: 2017
- AFC Champions League: 2020

Lion City Sailors

- Singapore Premier League: 2021
- Singapore Community Shield: 2022

Individual

- K League Manager of the Month: September 2017, July 2019, July 2020
- Singapore Premier League Coach of the Month: September 2021, April 2022
