= 2005 A3 Champions Cup =

A3 Nissan Champions Cup 2005

Tournament details
- Host country: South Korea
- Dates: 13 – 19 February
- Teams: 4 (from 1 confederation)
- Venue: 1 (in 1 host city)

Final positions
- Champions: (South Korea) Suwon Bluewings (1st title)
- Runners-up: (South Korea) Pohang Steelers
- Third place: (Japan) Yokohama F. Marinos
- Fourth place: (China) Shenzhen Jianlibao

Tournament statistics
- Matches played: 6
- Goals scored: 18 (3 per match)
- Top scorer(s): (Brazil) Nádson (6 goals) (Suwon Bluewings)
- Best player(s): (Brazil) Nádson (Suwon Bluewings)

The 2005 A3 Champions Cup was third edition of A3 Champions Cup. It was held from February 13 to 19, 2003 in Seogwipo, South Korea.

== Participants ==
- (South Korea) Suwon Samsung Bluewings – 2004 K-League Champions
- (South Korea) Pohang Steelers – 2004 K-League Runners-up
- (China) Shenzhen Jianlibao – 2004 Chinese Super League Champions
- (Japan) Yokohama F. Marinos – 2004 J. League Champions

== Group table ==
Team	Pld	W	D	L	GF	GA	GD	Pts
(South Korea) Suwon Samsung Bluewings (C)	3	2	1	0	8	4	+4	7
(South Korea) Pohang Steelers	3	1	2	0	5	3	+2	5
(Japan) Yokohama F. Marinos	3	1	1	1	4	4	0	4
(China) Shenzhen Jianlibao	3	0	0	3	1	7	−6	0

(C) Champions

=== Match results ===
All times are Korea Standard Time (KST) – UTC+9

13 February 2005
13:30

Pohang Steelers (South Korea)	1 – 1	(Japan) Yokohama F. Marinos
Santos 64'		Shimizu 3'

Jeju World Cup Stadium, Seogwipo

13 February 2005
16:00

Shenzhen Jianlibao (China)	1 – 3	(South Korea) Suwon Samsung Bluewings
Yang Chen 6'		Nádson 3', 26'; Kim Dae-Eui 5'

Jeju World Cup Stadium, Seogwipo

16 February 2005
16:30

Yokohama F. Marinos (Japan)	2 – 0	(China) Shenzhen Jianlibao
Ueno 46'; Kumabayashi 63'

Jeju World Cup Stadium, Seogwipo

16 February 2005
19:00

Suwon Samsung Bluewings (South Korea)	2 – 2	(South Korea) Pohang Steelers
Nádson 27', 30'		Moon Min-Kwi 81'; Back Young-Chul 89'

Jeju World Cup Stadium, Seogwipo

19 February 2005
13:30

Suwon Samsung Bluewings (South Korea)	3 – 1	(Japan) Yokohama F. Marinos
Nádson 16', 85'; Kim Dong-hyun 51'		Ōshima 20'

Jeju World Cup Stadium, Seogwipo

19 February 2005
16:00

Pohang Steelers (South Korea)	2 – 0	(China) Shenzhen Jianlibao
Da Silva 9'; Back Young-Chul 88'

Jeju World Cup Stadium, Seogwipo

== Awards ==
=== Winners ===
2005 A3 Champions Cup

First title

=== Individual awards ===
Top Goalscorers	Most Valuable Player
(Brazil) Nádson (Suwon Bluewings)	(Brazil) Nádson (Suwon Bluewings)

== Goalscorers ==
Pos	Player	Team	Goals
1	(Brazil) Nádson	(South Korea) Suwon Samsung Bluewings	6
2	(South Korea) Back Young-Chul	(South Korea) Pohang Steelers	2
3	(Brazil) Da Silva	(South Korea) Pohang Steelers	1
3	(South Korea) Moon Min-Kwi	(South Korea) Pohang Steelers	1
3	(Brazil) Santos	(South Korea) Pohang Steelers	1
3	(China) Yang Chen	(China) Shenzhen Jianlibao	1
3	(South Korea) Kim Dae-Eui	(South Korea) Suwon Samsung Bluewings	1
3	(South Korea) Kim Dong-hyun	(South Korea) Suwon Samsung Bluewings	1
3	(Japan) Shingo Kumabayashi	(Japan) Yokohama F. Marinos	1
3	(Japan) Hideo Ōshima	(Japan) Yokohama F. Marinos	1
3	(Japan) Norihisa Shimizu	(Japan) Yokohama F. Marinos	1
3	(Japan) Yoshiharu Ueno	(Japan) Yokohama F. Marinos	1
