= Papa Oumar Coly =

Senegalese footballer (born 1975)

Personal information
- Date of birth: 20 May 1975 (age 51)
- Place of birth: Senegal
- Position: Defender

Senior career*
Years	Team	Apps	(Gls)
2001–2003	Daejeon		
- Port Autonome
- * Club domestic league appearances and goals

Papa Oumar Coly (born 20 May 1975) is a Senegalese former professional footballer who played as a defender. Besides Senegal, he has played in South Korea. He has been called up to the Senegal national team.

== Career ==
Before the 2001 season, Coly signed for South Korean top flight side Daejeon, becoming their first ever foreign player. In 2001, he helped them win the 2001 Korean FA Cup, their only major trophy. He was seen as a fan favorite. Before the 2004 season, he left Daejeon. After that, he signed for Port Autonome in Senegal.
