= 2006 A3 Champions Cup =

Tournament details
- Host country: Japan
- Dates: 2 – 8 August
- Teams: 4 (from 1 confederation)
- Venue: 1 (in 1 host city)

Final positions
- Champions: (South Korea) Ulsan Hyundai Horang-i (1st title)
- Runners-up: (Japan) Gamba Osaka
- Third place: (Japan) JEF United
- Fourth place: (China) Dalian Shide

Tournament statistics
- Matches played: 6
- Goals scored: 26 (4.33 per match)
- Attendance: 70,950 (11,825 per match)
- Top scorer(s): (South Korea) Lee Chun-Soo (Ulsan Hyundai, 6 goals)
- Best player(s): (South Korea) Lee Chun-Soo (Ulsan Hyundai)

The fourth edition of the A3 Champions Cup took place in Tokyo, Japan, between 2 and 8 August 2006. It was won by Korean team Ulsan Hyundai Horang-i, who came back strongly from their defeat in the opening match to win the following two by margins of 6–0 and 4–0. It was the third time a Korean team has won this competition.

== Participants ==
- (China) Dalian Shide - 2005 Chinese Super League Champions
- (Japan) Gamba Osaka - 2005 J. League Champions
- (Japan) JEF United Chiba - 2005 Yamazaki Nabisco Cup Winners (invited)
- (South Korea) Ulsan Hyundai Horang-i - 2005 K-League Champions

== Group table ==
Team	Pld	W	D	L	GF	GA	GD	Pts
(South Korea) Ulsan Hyundai Horang-i	3	2	0	1	12	3	+9	6
(Japan) Gamba Osaka	3	2	0	1	5	8	−3	6
(Japan) JEF United Ichihara Chiba	3	1	1	1	5	6	−1	4
(China) Dalian Shide	3	0	1	2	4	9	−5	1

== Matches ==
Round 1

2 August 2006
17:00

Gamba Osaka (Japan)	3 – 2	(China) Dalian Shide
Yamaguchi 17'; Magno Alves 18', 53'		Zou Jie 57'; Wang Sheng 71'

Tokyo National Stadium, Tokyo
Attendance: 7,178

2 August 2006
19:30

Ulsan Hyundai Horang-i (South Korea)	2 – 3	(Japan) JEF United Ichihara Chiba
Choi Sung-Kuk 24'; Lee Chun-Soo 42'		Nakajima 21'; Maki 43'; Hanyu 44'

Tokyo National Stadium, Tokyo
Attendance: 11,066

Round 2

5 August 2006
17:00

Ulsan Hyundai Horang-i (South Korea)	6 – 0	(Japan) Gamba Osaka
Kim Young-Sam 24'; Leandrão 34', 83'; Lee Chun-Soo 46', 74', 85'

Tokyo National Stadium, Tokyo
Attendance: 13,688

5 August 2006
19:30

JEF United Ichihara Chiba (Japan)	2 – 2	(China) Dalian Shide
Abe 53' (pen.); Maki 65'		Zou Jie 30'; Zhu Ting 57'

Tokyo National Stadium, Tokyo
Attendance: 17,052

Round 3

8 August 2006
17:00

Dalian Shide (China)	0 – 4	(South Korea) Ulsan Hyundai Horang-i
		Lee Chun-Soo 34', 72'; Leandrão 43'; Choi Sung-Kuk 48'

Tokyo National Stadium, Tokyo
Attendance: 6,821

8 August 2006
19:30

Gamba Osaka (Japan)	2 – 0	(Japan) JEF United Ichihara Chiba
Endō 66'; Bando 81'

Tokyo National Stadium, Tokyo
Attendance: 15,145

== Awards ==
=== Winners ===
A3 Champions Cup 2006 Winners

Ulsan Hyundai Horang-i
First title

=== Individual awards ===
Top Goalscorers	Most Valuable Player
(South Korea) Lee Chun-Soo (Ulsan)	(South Korea) Lee Chun-Soo (Ulsan)

== Goalscorers ==
Pos	Player	Team	Goals
1	(South Korea) Lee Chun-Soo	(South Korea) Ulsan Hyundai Horang-i	6
2	(Brazil) Leandrão	(South Korea) Ulsan Hyundai Horang-i	3
3	(China) Zou Jie	(China) Dalian Shide	2
3	(Brazil) Magno Alves	(Japan) Gamba Osaka	2
3	(Japan) Seiichiro Maki	(Japan) JEF United Ichihara Chiba	2
3	(South Korea) Choi Sung-Kuk	(South Korea) Ulsan Hyundai Horang-i	2
7	(China) Wang Sheng	(China) Dalian Shide	1
7	(China) Zhu Ting	(China) Dalian Shide	1
7	(Japan) Ryūji Bando	(Japan) Gamba Osaka	1
7	(Japan) Yasuhito Endō	(Japan) Gamba Osaka	1
7	(Japan) Satoshi Yamaguchi	(Japan) Gamba Osaka	1
7	(Japan) Yuki Abe	(Japan) JEF United Ichihara Chiba	1
7	(Japan) Koji Nakajima	(Japan) JEF United Ichihara Chiba	1
7	(Japan) Naotake Hanyu	(Japan) JEF United Ichihara Chiba	1
7	(South Korea) Kim Young-Sam	(South Korea) Ulsan Hyundai Horang-i	1
