= Kim Eun-jung (footballer) =

South Korean footballer (born 1979)

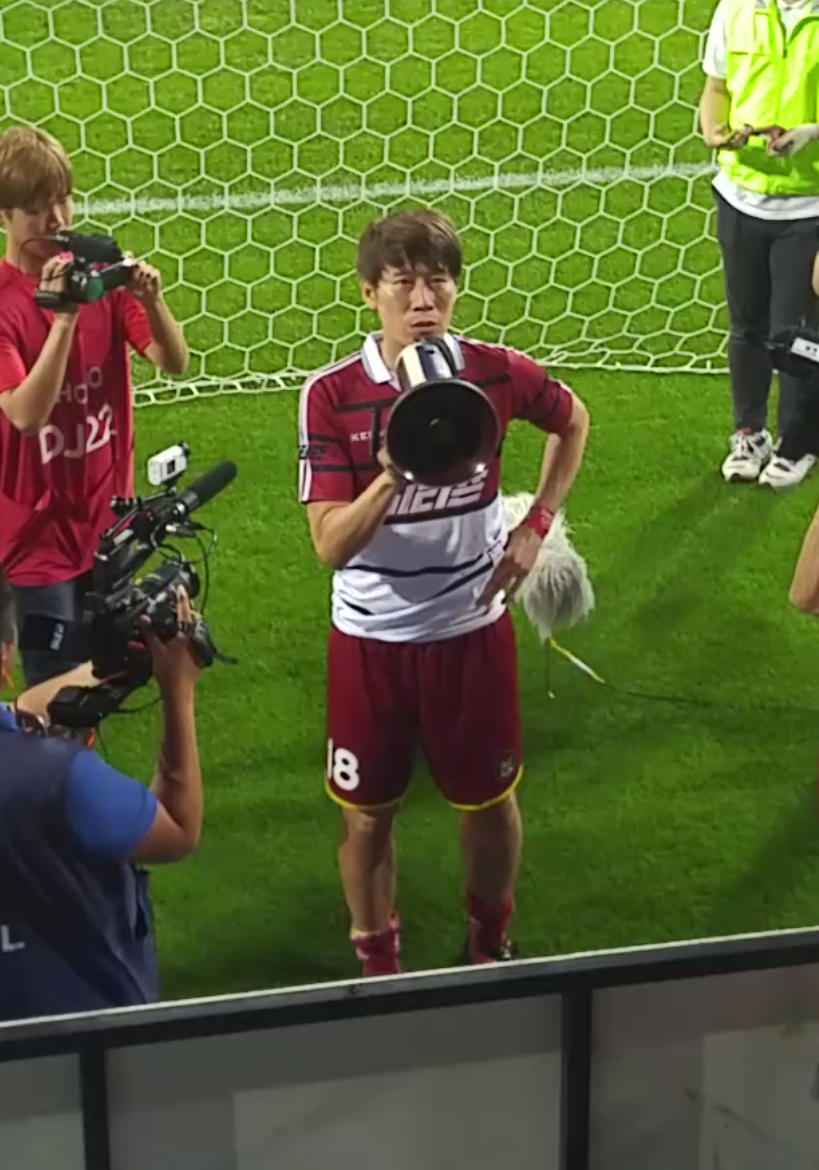
- Kim in 2016

Personal information
- Date of birth: 8 April 1979 (age 47)
- Place of birth: Seoul, South Korea
- Height: 1.84 m (6 ft 0 in)
- Position: Striker

Team information
- Current team: Suwon FC (manager)

Youth career
- 1994–1996: Dongbuk High School

Senior career*
Years	Team	Apps	(Gls)
1997–2003	Daejeon Citizen	125	(29)
2003	→ Vegalta Sendai (loan)	10	(2)
2004–2008	FC Seoul	90	(27)
2009	Changsha Ginde	28	(7)
2010–2011	Jeju United	57	(19)
2012–2013	Gangwon FC	54	(16)
2013	→ Pohang Steelers (loan)	9	(1)
2014	Daejeon Citizen	17	(3)
Total		390	(104)

International career
1998–1999	South Korea U20	11	(7)
1999–2002	South Korea U23	10	(4)
1998–2004	South Korea	15	(5)

Managerial career
- 2017: Tubize (caretaker)
- 2021–2023: South Korea U20
- 2024–2025: Suwon FC
- 2026–: South Korea U23
Medal record
Men's football
Representing South Korea
Asian Games
Bronze medal – third place	2002 Busan
AFC Youth Championship
Winner	1998 Thailand
EAFF Championship
Winner	2003 Japan
Korean name
Hangul	김은중
Hanja	金殷中
RR	Gim Eunjung
MR	Kim Ŭnjung
- * Club domestic league appearances and goals

Kim Eun-jung (Korean: 김은중; born 8 April 1979) is a South Korean football manager and former player who played as a striker. He is currently manager of South Korea U23.

== Club career ==
Kim played for numerous East Asian clubs during his professional career, but he is regarded as a legend of K League club Daejeon Citizen. In 1997, he started his career at the newly-formed Daejeon Citizen, becoming their founding member. At the 2001 Korean FA Cup, he scored four goals including the winning goal in the final, bringing the club's first major title. He also chose Daejeon as the last club of his playing career when the club was relegated to the K League 2 in 2014. He was not a main player at this time, but helped Daejeon win the league. After they was promoted to the K League 1 the next year, he joined Belgian Second Division club Tubize as a coach, retiring as a player.

== International career ==
Kim played for the South Korea national team at 1998 Asian Games and 2004 AFC Asian Cup. He also represented South Korea at 1998 AFC Youth Championship, 1999 FIFA World Youth Championship, and 2002 Asian Games during his youth career. (The men's football at the Asian Games converted from senior tournament to under-23 tournament in 2002.)

Kim played with only one eye after his left eye was injured in his childhood. He was known as one of five South Korean football internationals, who went blind in one eye, alongside Lee Tae-ho, Yoo Sang-chul, Kwak Hee-ju, and Kwak Tae-hwi.

== Managerial career ==
Kim managed South Korea under-20s at 2023 AFC U-20 Asian Cup and 2023 FIFA U-20 World Cup, leading them to the semi-finals at both tournaments. He left the under-20 team after the U-20 World Cup, and was appointed manager of K League 1 club Suwon FC at the end of the year.

== Career statistics ==
=== Club ===
Appearances and goals by club, season and competition
Club	Season	League			National cup		League cup		Continental		Other		Total	
Club	Season	Division	Apps	Goals	Apps	Goals	Apps	Goals	Apps	Goals	Apps	Goals	Apps	Goals
Daejeon Citizen	1997	K League	9	0		0	5	0	—		—		14	0
Daejeon Citizen	1998	K League	13	0		0	16	6	—		—		29	6
Daejeon Citizen	1999	K League	22	4		0	2	0	—		—		24	4
Daejeon Citizen	2000	K League	17	4		0	3	1	—		—		20	5
Daejeon Citizen	2001	K League	23	7	4	4	8	2	—		—		35	13
Daejeon Citizen	2002	K League	19	3	3	1	8	4	3	1	—		33	9
Daejeon Citizen	2003	K League	22	11	0	0	—		3	1	—		25	12
Daejeon Citizen	Total		125	29	7	5	42	13	6	2	—		180	49
Vegalta Sendai (loan)	2003	J1 League	10	2	1	0	0	0	—		—		11	2
FC Seoul	2004	K League	24	8	0	0	5	0	—		—		29	8
FC Seoul	2005	K League	20	7	1	1	10	0	—		—		31	8
FC Seoul	2006	K League	24	9	3	1	12	5	—		1 (Note: Appearance(s) in K League Championship)	0	40	15
FC Seoul	2007	K League	9	0	1	1	7	4	—		—		17	5
FC Seoul	2008	K League	13	3	1	0	6	1	—		2	1	22	5
FC Seoul	Total		90	27	6	3	40	10	—		3	1	139	41
Changsha Ginde	2009	Chinese Super League	28	7	—		—		—		—		28	7
Jeju United	2010	K League	27	13	4	3	4	4	—		3	0	38	20
Jeju United	2011	K League	30	6	2	1	0	0	5	1	—		37	8
Jeju United	Total		57	19	6	4	4	4	5	1	3	0	75	28
Gangwon FC	2012	K League	41	16			—		—		—		41	16
Gangwon FC	2013	K League 1	13	0			—		—		—		13	0
Gangwon FC	Total		54	16			—		—		—		54	16
Pohang Steelers (loan)	2013	K League 1	9	1			—		—		—		9	1
Daejeon Citizen	2014	K League 2	17	3			—		—		—		17	3
Career total			390	104	20	12	86	27	11	3	6	1	513	147

=== International ===
Appearances and goals by national team and year
National team	Year	Apps	Goals
South Korea	1998	6	1
South Korea	2000	2	3
South Korea	2003	1	0
South Korea	2004	6	1
Total		15	5

Results list South Korea's goal tally first.

List of international goals scored by Kim Eun-jung
No.	Date	Venue	Opponent	Score	Result	Competition
1	4 December 1998	Bangkok, Thailand	Vietnam	1–0	4–0	1998 Asian Games
2	5 April 2000	Seoul, South Korea	Laos	2–0	9–0	2000 AFC Asian Cup qualification
3	5 April 2000	Seoul, South Korea	Laos	5–0	9–0	2000 AFC Asian Cup qualification
4	5 April 2000	Seoul, South Korea	Laos	6–0	9–0	2000 AFC Asian Cup qualification
5	5 June 2004	Daegu, South Korea	Turkey	2–1	2–1	Friendly

== Honours ==
=== Player ===
Daejeon Citizen

- Korean FA Cup: 2001
- K League 2: 2014

FC Seoul

- Korean League Cup: 2006

Pohang Steelers

- K League 1: 2013
- Korean FA Cup: 2013

South Korea U20

- AFC Youth Championship: 1998

South Korea U23

- Asian Games bronze medal: 2002

South Korea

- EAFF Championship: 2003

Individual

- K League All-Star: 1998, 1999, 2001, 2002, 2003, 2004, 2005, 2006, 2012
- Korean FA Cup Most Valuable Player: 2001
- Korean FA Cup top goalscorer: 2001
- K League All-Star Game Most Valuable Player: 2004
- K League 1 Best XI: 2006, 2010
- K League 1 Most Valuable Player: 2010

=== Manager ===
Individual

- K League Manager of the Month: July 2025

Sporting positions
Preceded by Cho Yong-hyung	Jeju United captain 2010–2011	Succeeded by Choi Won-kwon
Preceded by Lee Eul-yong	Gangwon FC captain 2012	Succeeded by Chun Jae-ho
