= 2013 K League =

2013 K League may refer to:

- 2013 K League Classic (1st Division)
- 2013 K League Challenge (2nd Division)
