= Kim Dong-kyu =

South Korean footballer (born 1981)

Kim Dong-Kyu
Personal information
- Full name: Kim Dong-Kyu (김동규)
- Date of birth: May 13, 1981 (age 45)
- Place of birth: South Korea
- Height: 1.83 m (6 ft 0 in)
- Position: Midfielder

Senior career*
Years	Team	Apps	(Gls)
2004–2005	Ulsan Hyundai	8	(0)
2006–2007	Gwangju Sangmu	21	(0)
2008–2009	Ulsan Hyundai	7	(0)
- * Club domestic league appearances and goals

Kim Dong-Kyu (born May 13, 1981) is a South Korean football player who since 2008 has played for Ulsan Hyundai (formerly Gwangju Sangmu).
