= Nádson (footballer, born 1982) =

Brazilian footballer

Personal information
- Full name: Nádson Rodrigues de Souza
- Date of birth: 30 January 1982 (age 44)
- Place of birth: Serrinha, Bahia, Brazil
- Height: 1.72 m (5 ft 8 in)
- Position: Striker

Youth career
- 1999–2000: Vitória

Senior career*
| Years | Team | Apps | (Gls) |
| 2001–2003 | Vitória | 22 | (11) |
| 2003–2008 | Suwon Samsung Bluewings | 52 | (31) |
| 2005–2006 | → Corinthians (loan) | 6 | (1) |
| 2008 | Vegalta Sendai | 12 | (3) |
| 2009 | Vitória | 14 | (8) |
| 2009 | Bahia | 20 | (9) |
| 2010 | Sport Recife | 4 | (0) |
| 2011 | Jacuipense | 0 | (0) |
| 2011 | América-RN | 2 | (0) |
| 2012 | Al-Shamal | 14 | (15) |
| 2012–2013 | Jacuipense | 5 | (1) |
| 2013 | Ypiranga | 0 | (0) |
| 2014 | Lagarto | 18 | (7) |
| 2014 | São Mateus | 0 | (0) |
| 2015 | Jacuipense | 8 | (4) |
| 2016 | URT | 3 | (1) |
| Total | | 180 | (91) |

International career
| 2003 | Brazil | 2 | (0) |
Medal record
Men's football
Representing Brazil
CONCACAF Gold Cup
| Runner-up | 2003 Mexico–United States |
- * Club domestic league appearances and goals

Nádson Rodrigues de Souza (born 30 January 1982), usually known as Nádson, is a Brazilian former professional footballer who played as a striker.

== Club career ==
21-year-old striker Nádson proved his potential in 2003, spending his best year. He helped Vitória won the Campeonato Baiano and the Copa do Nordeste, and became the top goalscorer of both competitions. He also played the leading role in Vitória's historical match, scoring four goals in a 7–2 Copa do Brasil win over Palmeiras. His performances led him to represent Brazil at the 2003 CONCACAF Gold Cup.

On 7 August 2003, K League club Suwon Samsung Bluewings paid $2.7 million, which consisted of a transfer fee of $1.5 million, the wage of $1 million for five years, and a deposit of $0.2 million, for Nádson. The sum was the highest ever for a foreign player in South Korea at the time. He was nicknamed "Nadgoal" by Suwon fans due to his impressive scoring ability. In the 2004 season, he contributed to winning the K League, and became the first foreign player to receive the K League Most Valuable Player Award. In 2005, he won the A3 Champions Cup and the Korean Super Cup. He scored two goals in every match of the 2005 A3 Champions Cup, being selected as the Most Valuable Player of the competition by scoring a total of six goals. He also scored the winning goal in a 1–0 Super Cup win over Busan IPark.

In the middle of the 2005 season, however, Nádson had injured his left achilles tendon and right ankle, and had operations and rehabilitation training in Brazil. In 2006, after recovering from the injuries, he refused to return to Suwon, and stayed at Vitória's training ground until summer. He joined Corinthians on loan on 3 August, but suffered a relapse at the new club. He came back to Suwon in 2007, but Suwon also gave up a contract extension with him after his frequent absences.

After leaving Suwon, Nádson played for several Brazilian clubs in addition to J2 League side Vegalta Sendai and Qatari Second Division side Al-Shamal. He retired as a player in 2016.

== International career ==
Nádson was selected for the Brazil national team for the 2003 CONCACAF Gold Cup. He played as a substitute in a group stage match against Mexico and the semi-final match against the United States.

== Style of play ==
Despite having a small stature, Nádson threatened opponents with clever movement and accurate shots. He was skilled in sharp sense rather than power.

== Career statistics ==
=== Club ===
Appearances and goals by club, season and competition
| Club | Season | League | | | State league | | National cup | | League cup | | Continental | | Other | | Total | |
| Club | Season | Division | Apps | Goals | Apps | Goals | Apps | Goals | Apps | Goals | Apps | Goals | Apps | Goals | Apps | Goals |
|---|---|---|---|---|---|---|---|---|---|---|---|---|---|---|---|---|
| Vitória | 2001 | Série A | 1 | 0 | | | 0 | 0 | — | | — | | 0 | 0 | 1 | 0 |
| Vitória | 2002 | Série A | 6 | 1 | | | 0 | 0 | — | | — | | 0 | 0 | 6 | 1 |
| Vitória | 2003 | Série A | 15 | 10 | ? (Note: Appearances in Campeonato Baiano) | (7) | 7 | 8 | — | | — | | 4 (Note: Appearances in Copa do Nordeste) | 5 | 26 | 23 |
| Vitória | Total | | 22 | 11 | | | 7 | 8 | — | | — | | 4 | 5 | 33 | 24 |
| Suwon Samsung Bluewings | 2003 | K League | 18 | 14 | — | | | | — | | — | | — | | 18 | 14 |
| Suwon Samsung Bluewings | 2004 | K League | 23 | 12 | — | | | | 12 | 2 | — | | 3 (Note: Appearances in K League Championship) | 0 | 38 | 14 |
| Suwon Samsung Bluewings | 2005 | K League | 3 | 1 | — | | | | 12 | 6 | (Note: Appearance(s) in AFC Champions League) | | 4 (Note: Three appearances and six goals in A3 Champions Cup, one appearance and one goal in Korean Super Cup) | 7 | 19 | 14 |
| Suwon Samsung Bluewings | 2007 | K League | 8 | 4 | — | | | | 7 | 4 | — | | 0 | 0 | 15 | 8 |
| Suwon Samsung Bluewings | Total | | 52 | 31 | — | | | | 31 | 12 | | | 7 | 7 | 90 | 50 |
| Corinthians (loan) | 2006 | Série A | 6 | 1 | — | | — | | — | | 1 (Note: Appearance in Copa Sudamericana) | 1 | 0 | 0 | 7 | 2 |
| Vegalta Sendai | 2008 | J2 League | 12 | 3 | — | | | | — | | — | | — | | 12 | 3 |
| Vitória | 2009 | Série A | — | | 14 | 8 | 1 | 0 | — | | — | | — | | 15 | 8 |
| Bahia | 2009 | Série B | 20 | 9 | — | | — | | — | | — | | 0 | 0 | 20 | 9 |
| Sport Recife | 2010 | Série B | 4 | 0 | | | 0 | 0 | — | | — | | 0 | 0 | 4 | 0 |
| América-RN | 2011 | Série C | 2 | 0 | — | | — | | — | | — | | — | | 2 | 0 |
| Al-Shamal | 2011–12 | Qatari Second Division | 14 | 15 | — | | | | — | | — | | — | | 14 | 15 |
| Jacuipense | 2013 | — | | | 5 | 1 | — | | — | | — | | 0 | 0 | 5 | 1 |
| Lagarto | 2014 | — | | | 18 (Note: Appearances in Campeonato Sergipano) | 7 | 2 | 0 | — | | — | | — | | 20 | 7 |
| Jacuipense | 2015 | — | | | 8 | 4 | 3 | 1 | — | | — | | — | | 11 | 5 |
| URT | 2016 | Série D | — | | 3 (Note: Appearances in Campeonato Mineiro) | 1 | — | | — | | — | | — | | 3 | 1 |
| Career total | | | 132 | 70 | 48 | 21 | 13 | 9 | 31 | 12 | 1 | 1 | 11 | 12 | 236 | 125 |

=== International ===
Appearances and goals by national team and year
| National team | Year | Apps | Goals |
|---|---|---|---|
| Brazil | 2003 | 2 | 0 |

== Honours ==
Vitória

- Campeonato Baiano: 2002, 2003, 2009
- Copa do Nordeste: 2003

Suwon Samsung Bluewings

- K League 1: 2004
- Korean League Cup: 2005
- Korean Super Cup: 2005
- A3 Champions Cup: 2005

Sport Recife

- Campeonato Pernambucano: 2010

Brazil

- CONCACAF Gold Cup runner-up: 2003

Individual

- Campeonato Baiano top goalscorer: 2003
- Copa do Nordeste top goalscorer: 2003
- K League All-Star: 2004
- K League 1 Most Valuable Player: 2004
- K League 1 Best XI: 2004
- A3 Champions Cup Most Valuable Player: 2005
- A3 Champions Cup top goalscorer: 2005
- Korean Super Cup Most Valuable Player: 2005
