= Lee Chun-soo =

South Korean footballer (born 1981)

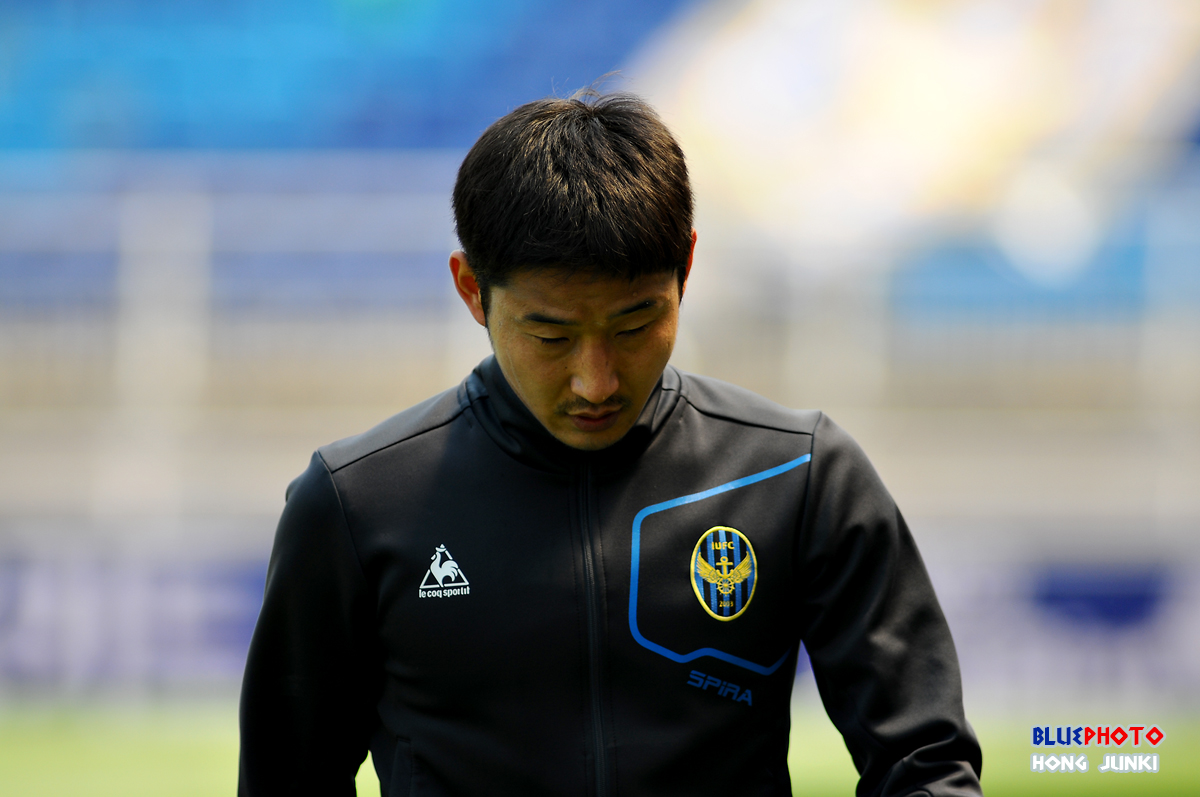
- Lee with Incheon United in 2013

Personal information
- Full name: Lee Chun-soo
- Date of birth: 9 July 1981 (age 45)
- Place of birth: Incheon, South Korea
- Height: 1.73 m (5 ft 8 in)
- Positions: Winger; attacking midfielder

Youth career
- 1994–1996: Bupyeongdong Middle School
- 1997–1999: Bupyeong High School

College career
Years	Team	Apps	(Gls)
2000–2001	Korea University		

Senior career*
Years	Team	Apps	(Gls)
2002–2003	Ulsan Hyundai Horang-i	36	(15)
2003–2005	Real Sociedad	13	(0)
2004–2005	→ Numancia (loan)	15	(0)
2005–2007	Ulsan Hyundai Horang-i	45	(14)
2007–2009	Feyenoord	12	(0)
2008	→ Suwon Samsung Bluewings (loan)	3	(0)
2009	→ Jeonnam Dragons (loan)	7	(4)
2009–2010	Al-Nassr	16	(3)
2010–2011	Omiya Ardija	43	(8)
2013–2015	Incheon United	67	(5)
Total		257	(49)

International career
1999–2000	South Korea U20	11	(12)
1999–2006	South Korea U23	28 (Note: Includes six appearances and one goal as an overage player in Asian Games.)	(11)
2000–2008	South Korea	78	(10)
Medal record
Representing South Korea
Men's football
AFC Asian Cup
Bronze medal – third place	2007 Indonesia, Malaysia, Thailand and Vietnam
Asian Games
Bronze medal – third place	2002 Busan
- * Club domestic league appearances and goals

- Lee Chun-soo
- Hangul: 이천수
- Hanja: 李天秀
- RR: I Cheonsu
- MR: I Ch'ŏnsu

Lee Chun-soo (Korean: 이천수; born 9 July 1981) is a South Korean former professional footballer who played as a winger and attacking midfielder. He was known for his pace, dribbling ability, and proficiency at free kicks.

Lee began his professional career with Ulsan Hyundai Horang-i in 2002, winning the K League Rookie of the Year award. In 2003, he became the first South Korean to join a La Liga club when he signed for Real Sociedad. After a loan spell at Numancia, he returned to Ulsan in 2005, helping the club win the league title and winning the league's MVP award. He subsequently played for Feyenoord and clubs in South Korea, Saudi Arabia, and Japan, finishing his career at Incheon United in 2015.

Lee scored 10 goals in 78 appearances for South Korea between 2000 and 2008. He appeared in all seven matches as the team reached the semifinals of the 2002 FIFA World Cup. At the 2006 FIFA World Cup, he scored a free kick against Togo in South Korea's first World Cup victory outside their own country. He also competed at the 2000 and 2004 Summer Olympics and helped South Korea finish third at the 2007 AFC Asian Cup.

Lee was known for his outspoken manner and confrontational behavior during his playing career, which was also marked by disciplinary suspensions and disputes with clubs. After retirement, he worked in football administration and became a television personality and football commentator. As of 2021, he also runs the YouTube channel Richunsu.

== Early life ==
Lee was born in Incheon and began playing football in the fourth grade at Bupyeong Elementary School. He then attended Bupyeongdong Middle School and Bupyeong High School. Lee's family experienced financial difficulties after his father's employer went bankrupt while Lee was in middle school, and he frequently struggled to pay his football team's boarding fees during high school.

Lee initially was not a starter for his high school because of his small stature but trained at night to improve his fitness. He and his school teammates Choi Tae-uk and Park Yong-ho were known as the "Bupyeong trio"; all three later represented South Korea at senior level. Lee first attracted attention in 1998, when he helped Bupyeong win the autumn high-school football federation tournament, finishing as its top scorer with eight goals. He then helped the school win three titles in 1999, and professional clubs sought to recruit him later that year.

Lee entered Korea University in 2000, turning down professional offers on the understanding that he could pursue a move abroad. That March, he helped the university win the President's Cup. His performances in 2000 earned him the nickname "Millennium Express" (밀레니엄 특급). Lee left university after his second year and joined Ulsan Hyundai Horang-i in February 2002.

== Club career ==
=== Ulsan Hyundai Horang-i ===
Lee signed a five-year contract with Ulsan Hyundai Horang-i in February 2002, with the club agreeing to support a future move abroad. He scored on his professional debut against Suwon Samsung Bluewings on 10 July 2002.

Lee recorded seven goals and nine assists in 18 appearances during the 2002 K League season. He helped Ulsan win their final eight matches and finish as runners-up. He won the league's top assist provider award and was selected for the Best XI. He was also named Rookie of the Year, receiving 73 of 74 votes.

In May 2003, Lee was named the Asian Football Confederation's Young Player of the Year for 2002. He recorded eight goals and six assists in 18 league appearances for Ulsan in 2003 before joining Real Sociedad in July.

=== Real Sociedad ===
In July 2003, Lee joined Real Sociedad for a transfer fee of US$3.5 million, signing a three-year contract with an option for a fourth year. He became the first South Korean to join a La Liga club.

Lee made his competitive debut against Espanyol on 30 August 2003. The match ended in a 1–1 draw, with Darko Kovačević scoring Sociedad's equaliser by finishing Lee's chip over the goalkeeper. Lee was credited with an assist. That September, he told Korean reporters that he hoped to move to Barcelona within two years and join Real Madrid two years later.

Lee made 21 competitive appearances during the 2003–04 season, including 13 in La Liga and six in the UEFA Champions League, without scoring. Reflecting on the move in 2018, Lee said that he had been unprepared to live abroad and had struggled to adapt to a different culture. He recalled difficulties connecting with manager Raynald Denoueix and credited teammate Javier de Pedro with helping him settle in.

==== Loan to Numancia ====
In August 2004, Lee joined Numancia on a season-long loan. He initially impressed, with Spanish sports newspaper AS selecting him as its player of the match against both Getafe and Albacete in September.

By January 2005, Lee had lost his place in the side, and manager Máximo Hernández publicly expressed concern about his form and condition. He made 16 competitive appearances for Numancia without scoring.

Reflecting on Lee's spell in 2024, his former coach Francisco said that language difficulties forced him to explain tactics through diagrams and left Lee feeling isolated. Teammate Juanlu recalled that Lee impressed in training but struggled to reproduce those performances in matches, despite his teammates' efforts to help him settle.

In March 2005, Numancia and Real Sociedad agreed to terminate the loan early. Lee returned to South Korea to recover from a hamstring injury, and Sociedad agreed that he would rejoin Ulsan Hyundai Horang-i at the end of the season.

=== Return to Ulsan ===
Lee returned to Ulsan for the second half of the 2005 K League season. On 27 November, he scored a hat-trick and provided an assist in a 5–1 away victory over Incheon United in the first leg of the championship final. Ulsan won 6–3 on aggregate to claim their first league title in nine years. In the second leg, Lee became the fastest player to reach both 20 goals and 20 assists in the K League, doing so in 50 appearances. He recorded seven goals and five assists across the regular season and play-offs and received the league's MVP award at the end of the season.

In 2006, Lee helped Ulsan win the Super Cup. In August, he scored six goals in three matches as Ulsan won the A3 Champions Cup, including a hat-trick in a 6–0 victory over Gamba Osaka. He finished as the tournament's top scorer and most valuable player. His season ended in October when he received a six-match suspension and a ₩4 million fine for verbally abusing match officials during a league game against Incheon.

In June 2007, Lee scored the only goal of Ulsan's League Cup semi-final against Suwon Samsung Bluewings with a free kick. He missed the final while on international duty as Ulsan defeated FC Seoul 2–1 to win the competition. In August, Ulsan agreed to sell Lee to Feyenoord for €2 million.

=== Feyenoord ===
In August 2007, Lee agreed a four-year contract with Eredivisie club Feyenoord. He made his debut as a second-half substitute in a 1–0 league win over Excelsior on 20 October. In November, Feyenoord granted him two weeks' leave in South Korea while he was suffering from influenza and struggling to adjust to life in the Netherlands.

In January 2008, Lee assisted Jonathan de Guzmán's opening goal in a 4–0 win over SV Deurne in the round of 16 of the KNVB Cup. Feyenoord went on to win the competition, defeating Roda JC 2–0 in the final. Lee made 12 league appearances during the season without scoring. He underwent ankle surgery in May and spent his rehabilitation in South Korea.

In July 2008, Lee joined Suwon Samsung Bluewings on a season-long loan. Feyenoord's technical director, Peter Bosz, said that Lee had no immediate place in the club's intended system for the coming season and that the club hoped the loan would provide him with regular playing time.

==== Loan to Suwon Samsung Bluewings ====
Lee was recovering from ankle surgery when he joined Suwon Samsung Bluewings in July 2008. He made his debut as a substitute in a 1–0 league win over Gyeongnam FC on 23 August. Four days later, on his home debut, he came off the bench to score the only goal in a League Cup group-stage victory over Incheon United.

Lee suffered a groin muscle tear in September, for which he was prescribed up to four weeks of rest and rehabilitation. He ultimately made four appearances for Suwon, scoring once. His spell was also marked by disagreements with the coaching staff. In December, he apologized to manager Cha Bum-kun for failing to repay his support with strong performances.

On 24 December 2008, the K League declared Lee ineligible to play at Suwon's request, after the club cited his absence from training and failure to follow the coaching staff's instructions. Suwon lifted the restriction in February 2009, allowing him to join Jeonnam Dragons on loan.

==== Loan to Jeonnam Dragons ====
On 26 February 2009, Lee joined Jeonnam Dragons on a loan scheduled to run until January 2010. Jeonnam manager Park Hang-seo had persuaded Suwon manager Cha Bum-kun to allow the move.

Lee scored a late free kick on his debut against FC Seoul on 7 March, in a 6–1 defeat. During the match, after a goal was disallowed for offside, he made an obscene arm gesture and an apparent shooting gesture towards an assistant referee. On 10 March, the K League suspended him for six matches, fined him ₩6 million and ordered him to carry the fair-play flag before three home matches. In 2021, Lee said that the apparent shooting gesture had been an attempt to plead with the official that was misinterpreted because of the camera angle.

Returning from suspension on 26 April, Lee scored and provided an assist in a 4–1 away win over Suwon, Jeonnam's first league victory of the season. He scored four goals in seven league appearances during the loan.

Lee's loan ended amid a dispute over a proposed transfer to Saudi Arabian club Al-Nassr. Following a disagreement with the coaching staff, Lee left the team on 28 June. Jeonnam requested the League that he be made ineligible to play in the K League, citing missed training, failure to follow instructions, and his unauthorized departure. The league imposed the restriction on 1 July. The ban prevented him from playing in the K League without Jeonnam's consent but permitted an overseas transfer. Lee's transfer from Feyenoord to Al-Nassr was confirmed later that month.

=== Al-Nassr ===
Lee joined Al-Nassr on a one-year contract in July 2009. In December, he scored twice in a 3–1 league victory over Al-Fateh. He sustained a rib injury later that month and made a series of substitute appearances after returning in January 2010.

On 17 March 2010, Lee returned to South Korea amid a dispute over unpaid wages. He said that Al-Nassr owed him three months' salary, a signing bonus, and other allowances. Al-Nassr said that Lee had left without permission and referred the matter to the Saudi Arabian Football Federation.

The Saudi Federation's refusal to issue an international transfer certificate delayed a move to Japan, but intervention by FIFA allowed Lee to join Omiya Ardija in August 2010. In April 2014, Al-Nassr reported that it had settled the outstanding payments, and Lee's complaint to FIFA was withdrawn.

=== Omiya Ardija ===
After training with the club on trial, Lee joined Omiya Ardija in August 2010 on a contract for the remainder of the season. He made his debut on 15 August, playing the full match in a goalless draw with Júbilo Iwata. Lee's first goals for the club came on 5 September, when he scored twice and provided an assist in a 4–1 victory over Kamatamare Sanuki in the Emperor's Cup. In December, he extended his contract for another year.

Lee opened the 2011 season by scoring twice in a 3–3 draw away to Kashima Antlers on 6 March. He was a regular starter before a hamstring injury in August ruled him out for several weeks. On 13 January 2012, Omiya announced that his contract had expired and would not be renewed. Lee scored eight goals in 43 league appearances across his two seasons with the club.

=== Incheon United ===
In February 2013, after more than a year without a club, Lee joined his hometown club Incheon United after Jeonnam agreed to lift the restriction preventing his return to domestic football. He had visited Jeonnam's home ground to apologize to supporters and meet members of the coaching staff to seek reconciliation. He made his debut as a second-half substitute in a 2–1 home defeat to Daejeon Citizen on 31 March, his first K League appearance in 1,381 days. On 25 May, he scored his first goal for Incheon and provided an assist in a 3–0 away victory over Busan IPark.

In October 2013, Incheon suspended Lee for the remainder of the season, fined him ₩20 million, and ordered him to perform 100 hours of community service following an altercation at a bar. Prosecutors subsequently decided not to prosecute, taking into account his lack of previous criminal punishment, his settlement with the counterparty in the altercation, and the club's disciplinary action.

Lee renewed his contract in February 2015. By then, he had taken on a mentoring role with the club's younger players. On 29 August, he scored the winning free kick in a 2–1 victory over Daejeon Citizen, securing Incheon's first four-match winning run since 2012.

Lee announced his retirement on 5 November 2015. An ankle injury prevented him from playing in Incheon's final league match against Jeonnam on 28 November, but the club held a farewell ceremony at half-time. He finished his three seasons at Incheon with five goals in 67 league appearances.

== International career ==
=== Early career and 2002 World Cup ===
Lee represented South Korea's under-18 team at the 1999 Bangabandhu Cup in Bangladesh, finishing as the tournament's leading scorer.

Lee made his debut for the senior national team on 5 April 2000 in Asian Cup qualifying against Laos, scoring in a 9–0 victory.

At the 2000 Summer Olympics, Lee scored the only goal against Morocco, converting the rebound after Tarik El Jarmouni had saved his penalty. However, Lee was sent off early in the final group match against Chile; South Korea won 1–0 but were eliminated on goal difference despite winning two of their three matches. He missed the 2000 AFC Asian Cup, due to the four-match suspension following his dismissal at the Olympics and a left ankle injury.

Lee joined Guus Hiddink's squad during its European training camp in August 2001 and established himself as an option on the wing. Lee appeared in all seven of South Korea's matches at the 2002 FIFA World Cup. While playing the first five matches as a substitute, he became famous for kicking Paolo Maldini's head in the round of 16 against Italy. In the semi-finals against Germany, where Lee was in the starting line-up for the first time, he had a shot saved by Oliver Kahn in the eighth minute, but drew criticism for carrying the ball rather than passing to an unmarked Ahn Jung-hwan during a second-half counterattack. The move ended when Michael Ballack fouled Lee in the 71st minute, receiving the booking that ruled him out of the final. Ballack scored the game's only goal four minutes later.

Lee helped South Korea win bronze at the 2002 Asian Games, scoring and providing an assist in the 3–0 third-place victory over Thailand. In March 2004, he scored the only goal in an Olympic qualifying victory over Iran at Azadi Stadium in Tehran, the first win there by a South Korean national side at any age level.

Lee missed the 2004 AFC Asian Cup as he focused on competing at the 2004 Summer Olympics. At the 2004 Olympics, South Korea reached the quarter-finals, where Lee scored twice in a 3–2 defeat to Paraguay.

=== 2006 World Cup ===
By the 2006 FIFA World Cup, Lee had become an important attacking player under Dick Advocaat, playing both on the wing and as an attacking midfielder. In South Korea's opening match against Togo on 13 June, he scored a 54th-minute equalizer with a free kick. South Korea went on to win 2–1, recording their first World Cup victory outside their own country.

After a 1–1 draw with France, South Korea suffered a 2–0 defeat to Switzerland and were eliminated in the group stage. Lee broke down in tears on the pitch after the defeat. He subsequently explained that he had been overwhelmed by disappointment at the elimination and a sense of having let down the supporters.

Lee returned as an overage player for the 2006 Asian Games, captaining the under-23 side as they finished fourth.

=== 2007 Asian Cup ===
Lee played in all six of South Korea's matches at the 2007 AFC Asian Cup, despite suffering from tonsillitis and a back injury. In the final group match, he set up Kim Jung-woo's winning goal against Indonesia, helping South Korea qualify for the quarter-finals. He converted his penalties in the quarter-final shoot-out victory over Iran and the semi-final defeat to Iraq. South Korea subsequently defeated Japan on penalties in the third-place match.

=== Retirement ===
Lee's final senior international appearance came against North Korea in a World Cup qualifier on 10 September 2008. He finished his international career with 10 goals in 78 appearances. On 24 March 2016, the Korea Football Association held a farewell ceremony for Lee at half-time of South Korea's World Cup qualifier against Lebanon at Ansan Wa~ Stadium.

== Style of play ==
Lee played as a winger and attacking midfielder. He combined pace and dribbling ability with considerable stamina. A contemporary assessment of his performances at the 2002 World Cup praised these qualities but identified inaccurate crossing and a tendency to pursue individual opportunities at the expense of combination play as weaknesses. Reviewing his career at retirement, The Hankyoreh also highlighted his vision and intelligent play.

Lee was also a free-kick specialist, scoring 12 goals directly from free kicks during his K League career. Although right-footed, he was effective from either side of the penalty area. He developed his technique by imitating David Beckham during extra practice after team training.

== After retirement ==
=== Football administration ===
In January 2019, Lee returned to Incheon United to oversee first-team and youth-team operations, scouting, and player support. He resigned in August 2020 after nineteen months in the role.

In January 2021, Lee was appointed chairman of the Korea Football Association's social contribution committee. He served until December 2022, and was succeeded by Cho Won-hee in January 2023.

=== Media work ===
Lee began working as a football commentator for JTBC3 Fox Sports in March 2016. He subsequently appeared as a coach on the SBS football entertainment program Kick a Goal, leading FC Bulnabang to its first-season championship in 2021. In February 2022, he and his family joined the reality program Mr. House Husband. His appearances earned him the Top Excellence Award in the reality category at the 2022 KBS Entertainment Awards.

In April 2021, Lee launched the football-focused YouTube channel Richunsu (리춘수), named after a fan's pronunciation of his name during his playing career in Spain. The channel's coverage of the 2022 FIFA World Cup featured match discussions with other former internationals. By December 2022, its video reacting to South Korea's qualification for the round of 16 had received more than five million views.

Lee's online football commentary also drew scrutiny. In March 2019, he criticized Paulo Bento's selection policy, arguing that Kim Seung-gyu would retain his place regardless of Jo Hyeon-woo's performances; other commentators challenged Lee's characterization of Bento. In July 2024, Lee joined other former internationals in questioning the KFA's appointment of Hong Myung-bo as national-team coach and supported Park Joo-ho, who had criticized the selection process.

Following South Korea's group-stage elimination at the 2026 FIFA World Cup, Lee criticized Hong's tactical inflexibility and the coaching staff's management of the players' physical condition, calling for those responsible to resign. Lee disputed Hong's suggestion that critics should work within the KFA to bring about change, saying that he had sought such opportunities but had repeatedly been excluded.

=== Political activities ===
Lee campaigned for Democratic Party politician Song Young-gil in the 2020 legislative election. In 2024, he supported People Power Party candidate Won Hee-ryong in Incheon's Gyeyang B constituency and chaired his fundraising association. Lee said that his endorsements reflected personal relationships and a wish to develop the area where he grew up, rather than allegiance to a particular party. He reported receiving online abuse and losing YouTube subscribers during the 2024 campaign.

== Personality and reputation ==
Lee's outspoken manner and confrontational behavior earned him a reputation as a "bad boy" of South Korean football. His talkativeness prompted mocking nicknames including "Hyeockham" (혀컴, combining the Korean word for "tongue" with David Beckham's surname), and "Ib Chun-soo" (입천수, substituting the word for "mouth" for his surname). In a 2013 interview, Lee described himself as reserved and said that his outward confidence concealed insecurity about his abilities.

Before the 2002 World Cup, Guus Hiddink sought to relax the national team's strict hierarchy centered on seniority and improve communication between younger and older players. At Hiddink's prompting, Lee addressed captain Hong Myung-bo, twelve years his senior, with "Myung-bo, let's eat" (명보야 밥 먹자), using Hong's given name and informal speech instead of the respectful language expected toward senior teammates. Other players later recalled their astonishment at his willingness to do so. Lee later adopted the phrase as the title of a YouTube interview series featuring former national teammates. He also recalled persuading the designated taker, Lee Eul-yong, to let him take the free kick against Togo at the 2006 World Cup because he was confident of scoring.

Lee credited his competitiveness with helping him overcome his small stature, while acknowledging that he struggled to keep his combative temperament confined to the pitch. His disciplinary record included suspensions for abusing match officials, while disputes with Suwon and Jeonnam led both clubs to place him on their inactive lists. Lee also attributed his kick to Paolo Maldini's head during the 2002 World Cup to anger at the Italian players' rough treatment of his teammates.

In its assessment at his retirement, The Hankyoreh judged that Lee's club career had not fulfilled expectations, citing his unsuccessful spells in Spain and the Netherlands. Lee later attributed his difficulties in Europe partly to having moved before he was adequately prepared for life abroad. He explained that he played best when able to communicate freely and feel at ease with teammates, but had struggled to adapt to his new surroundings.

== Career statistics ==
=== Club ===
Appearances and goals by club, season and competition
Club	Season	League			National cup		League cup		Continental		Other		Total	
Club	Season	Division	Apps	Goals	Apps	Goals	Apps	Goals	Apps	Goals	Apps	Goals	Apps	Goals
Ulsan Hyundai Horang-i	2002	K League	18	7	3	2	0	0	—		—		21	9
Ulsan Hyundai Horang-i	2003	K League	18	8	0	0	—		—		—		18	8
Ulsan Hyundai Horang-i	Total		36	15	3	2	0	0	—		—		39	17
Real Sociedad	2003–04	La Liga	13	0	2	0	—		6 (Note: Appearances in UEFA Champions League)	0	—		21	0
Real Sociedad	2004–05	La Liga	0	0	0	0	—		—		—		0	0
Real Sociedad	Total		13	0	2	0	—		6	0	—		21	0
Numancia (loan)	2004–05	La Liga	15	0	1	0	—		—		—		16	0
Ulsan Hyundai Horang-i	2005	K League	11	4	1	0	0	0	—		3 (Note: Appearances in K League Championship)	3	15	7
Ulsan Hyundai Horang-i	2006	K League	18	5	0	0	6	2	6 (Note: Appearances in AFC Champions League)	3	4 (Note: One appearance in K League Super Cup, three appearances and six goals in A3 Champions Cup)	6	34	16
Ulsan Hyundai Horang-i	2007	K League	16	5	1	0	10	2	—		—		27	7
Ulsan Hyundai Horang-i	Total		45	14	2	0	16	4	6	3	7	9	76	30
Feyenoord	2007–08	Eredivisie	12	0	2	0	—		—		—		14	0
Feyenoord	2008–09	Eredivisie	0	0	0	0	—		0	0	0	0	0	0
Feyenoord	Total		12	0	2	0	—		0	0	0	0	14	0
Suwon Samsung Bluewings (loan)	2008	K League	3	0	0	0	1	1	—		—		4	1
Jeonnam Dragons (loan)	2009	K League	7	4	1	0	1	0	—		—		9	4
Al-Nassr	2009–10	Saudi Pro League	16	3	0	0	0	0	—		3 (Note: Appearances in GCC Champions League)	1	19	4
Omiya Ardija	2010	J1 League	16	2	2 (Note: References:)	2	0	0	—		—		18	4
Omiya Ardija	2011	J1 League	27	6	1	0	0	0	—		—		28	6
Omiya Ardija	Total		43	8	3	2	0	0	—		—		46	10
Incheon United	2013	K League 1	19	2	1	0	—		—		—		20	2
Incheon United	2014	K League 1	28	1	0	0	—		—		—		28	1
Incheon United	2015	K League 1	20	2	0	0	—		—		—		20	2
Incheon United	Total		67	5	1	0	—		—		—		68	5
Career total			257	49	15	4	18	5	12	3	10	10	312	71

=== International ===
Appearances and goals by national team and year
National team	Year	Apps	Goals
South Korea	2000	9	2
South Korea	2001	7	1
South Korea	2002	16	1
South Korea	2003	6	0
South Korea	2004	4	1
South Korea	2005	8	0
South Korea	2006	17	3
South Korea	2007	10	2
South Korea	2008	1	0
Career total		78	10

Scores and results list South Korea's goal tally first; the score column indicates the score after each Lee goal.

List of international goals scored by Lee Chun-soo
No.	Date	Venue	Cap	Opponent	Score	Result	Competition
1	5 April 2000	Dongdaemun Stadium, Seoul, South Korea	1	Laos	3–0	9–0	2000 AFC Asian Cup qualification
2	7 April 2000	Dongdaemun Stadium, Seoul, South Korea	2	Mongolia	5–0	6–0	2000 AFC Asian Cup qualification
3	13 September 2001	Daejeon Hanbat Stadium, Daejeon, South Korea	11	Nigeria	1–2	2–2	Friendly
4	16 May 2002	Busan Asiad Main Stadium, Busan, South Korea	23	Scotland	1–0	4–1	Friendly
5	8 September 2004	Thống Nhất Stadium, Ho Chi Minh City, Vietnam	40	Vietnam	2–1	2–1	2006 FIFA World Cup qualification
6	29 January 2006	Hong Kong Stadium, Hong Kong	54	Croatia	2–0	2–0	2006 Lunar New Year Cup
7	22 February 2006	Al-Hamadaniah Stadium, Aleppo, Syria	58	Syria	2–1	2–1	2007 AFC Asian Cup qualification
8	13 June 2006	Waldstadion, Frankfurt, Germany	63	Togo	1–1	2–1	2006 FIFA World Cup
9	6 February 2007	Craven Cottage, London, England	68	Greece	1–0	1–0	Friendly
10	29 June 2007	Jeju World Cup Stadium, Seogwipo, South Korea	71	Iraq	2–0	3–0	Friendly

== Filmography ==
=== Television ===
Year	Title	Role	Ref.
2017	Society Game 2	Himself	
2021	Kick a Goal	Himself	
2021	Golden Eleven 2	Himself	
2021	Brad PT & GYM Carry	Himself	
2022–2024 (Note: In February 2024, Lee decided to temporarily suspend television appearances to participate in election campaigning.)	Mr. House Husband 2	Himself	
2022	Gundesliga	Himself	

=== Web series ===
Year	Title	Role	Ref.
2021	Ssangssang Invitational	Himself	

== Honours ==
=== Player ===
Ulsan Hyundai Horang-i

- K League 1: 2005
- Korean League Cup: 2007
- Korean Super Cup: 2006
- A3 Champions Cup: 2006

Feyenoord

- KNVB Cup: 2007–08

Suwon Samsung Bluewings

- K League 1: 2008
- Korean League Cup: 2008

Incheon United

- Korean FA Cup runner-up: 2015

South Korea U23

- Asian Games bronze medal: 2002

South Korea

- AFC Asian Cup third place: 2007

Individual

- K League All-Star: 2002, 2006, 2007, 2013
- K League 1 top assist provider: 2002
- K League Rookie of the Year: 2002
- K League 1 Best XI: 2002, 2005
- AFC Youth Player of the Year: 2002
- K League 1 Most Valuable Player: 2005
- A3 Champions Cup Most Valuable Player: 2006
- A3 Champions Cup top goalscorer: 2006
- AFC Asian Cup Team of the Tournament: 2007
- Korean FA Goal of the Year: 2007

=== Television personality ===
List of awards and nominations received by TV personality Lee Chun-soo
Award ceremony	Year	Category	Nominated work	Result	Ref.
KBS Entertainment Awards	2022	Top Excellence Award in Reality Category	Mr. House Husband 2	Won	
KBS Entertainment Awards	2023	Entertainer of the Year	Mr. House Husband 2	Won	
KBS Entertainment Awards	2023	Grand Prize	Mr. House Husband 2	Nominated	
