= Harry Castillo =

Colombian football forward (born 1974)

Personal information
- Full name: Harry German Castillo Vallejo
- Date of birth: 13 May 1974 (age 52)
- Height: 1.60 m (5 ft 3 in)
- Position: Forward

Senior career*
Years	Team	Apps	(Gls)
1998–1999	Millonarios		
2000	Suwon Bluewings	2	(1)
2000–2003	Busan IPark	59	(14)
2004	Ilhwa Chunma		
2005–2006	Millonarios	6	(0)
2006	Gyeongnam	20	(1)
2008–2009	Deportivo Pasto		
2010–2011	Bogotá		
- * Club domestic league appearances and goals as of 7 December 2013 ‡ National team caps and goals as of 7 October 2009

Harry German Castillo Vallejo (born 14 May 1974) is a Colombian football forward who played for many South Korean football clubs.
