= Marcos Denner =

Brazilian footballer (born 1976)

Personal information
- Full name: Marco Aurélio Martins Ivo
- Date of birth: March 12, 1976 (age 50)
- Place of birth: Rio de Janeiro, Brazil
- Height: 1.74 m (5 ft 9 in)
- Position: Forward

Team information
- Current team: Grêmio Esportivo Brasil

Senior career*
Years	Team	Apps	(Gls)
1994–1998	Nova Iguaçu		
1998	Tupi		
1999	América (SP)		
1999–2001	Juventus		
2001	Botafogo (SP)	24	(9)
2002	Anyang LG Cheetahs	23	(5)
2003	Portuguesa		
2003	Santo André		
2004	Criciúma	42	(13)
2005	Flamengo		
2005	Fortaleza	18	(1)
2006	Nova Iguaçu		
2006	Marília		
2006	Galo Maringá		
2006–2007	Paulista		
2007–2008	Sertãozinho		
2008–2009	Caxias	2	(0)
2009–2010	Juventude	27	(12)
2010	Criciúma	6	(2)
2011	Guarani		
2011–	Grêmio Esportivo Brasil		
- * Club domestic league appearances and goals as of 17 May 2008

Marco Aurélio Martins Ivo, known as Marcos Denner (born March 12, 1976) is a Brazilian footballer who currently plays as a forward for Grêmio Esportivo Brasil.

== Club career ==
His previous club was Nova Iguaçu, Tupi, América, Juventus, Botafogo, FC Seoul, then known as Anyang LG Cheetahs, Portuguesa, Santo André, Flamengo, Fortaleza, Marília, Galo Maringá, Paulista, Sertãozinho, Caxias, Juventude and Guarani.
