= Adilson Dos Santos =

Dutch footballer

Personal information
- Full name: Adilson Ben David Dos Santos
- Date of birth: 15 May 1974 (age 52)
- Place of birth: Rotterdam, Netherlands
- Position: Striker

Senior career*
Years	Team	Apps	(Gls)
1992–1995	Sparta	4	(0)
1994–1995	→ Eindhoven (loan)	10	(0)
1995–1996	Excelsior	12	(3)
1996–1999	RKC	75	(7)
1999–2002	NEC	25	(0)
Total		126	(10)
- * Club domestic league appearances and goals

Adilson Ben David Dos Santos (born 15 May 1974) is a Dutch retired footballer.

== Club career ==
He made his professional and Eredivisie debut for Sparta on 24 January 1993 against RKC and also played for Eindhoven, Excelsior, RKC and NEC during the 1992-2002 football seasons.

He was released by NEC in the summer of 2002.
