= Kim Sung-il (footballer) =

South Korean footballer (born 1973)

Kim Sung-il 김성일
Personal information
- Full name: Kim Sung-il
- Date of birth: April 13, 1973 (age 53)
- Place of birth: South Korea
- Height: 1.78 m (5 ft 10 in)
- Position: Defender

Youth career
- 1992–1995: Yonsei University

Senior career*
Years	Team	Apps	(Gls)
1996–1997	Sangmu (military service)		
1998–2003	Anyang LG Cheetahs	104	(16)
2004–2005	Seongnam Ilhwa Chunma	16	(0)

International career
2015–	Incheon United (coach)		
- * Club domestic league appearances and goals

- Kim Sung-il
- Hangul: 김성일
- Hanja: 金成鎰
- RR: Gim Seongil
- MR: Kim Sŏngil

Kim Sung-il (Korean: 김성일; born April 13, 1973 South Korea) is a South Korean former footballer who played as a defender.

He started professional career at FC Seoul, then known as Anyang LG Cheetahs in 1998.

Kim Sung-il was appointed as coach of Incheon United in 2015
