= Gyeonggi Gwangju FC =

South Korean football club

Gyeonggi Gwangju FC is a South Korean football club based in the city of Gwangju.

It has played at the third level of South Korean football.
