= Jung Kwang-min =

South Korean footballer (born 1976)

Jung Kwang-Min 정광민
Personal information
- Full name: Jung Kwang-Min
- Date of birth: January 30, 1976 (age 50)
- Height: 1.80 m (5 ft 11 in)
- Position: Midfielder

Youth career
- 1994–1997: Myongji University

Senior career*
| Years | Team | Apps | (Gls) |
| 1998–2002 | Anyang LG Cheetahs | 86 | (21) |
| 2007 | FC Seoul | 3 | (0) |
| 2007 | Daegu FC | 2 | (0) |

International career
| 1999–2001 | South Korea | 1 | (0) |

Managerial career
- 2015–2018: Kyonggi University
- 2019: FC Seoul (assistant coach)
- * Club domestic league appearances and goals

- Jung Kwang-min
- Hangul: 정광민
- Hanja: 丁光珉
- RR: Jeong Gwangmin
- MR: Chŏng Kwangmin

Jung Kwang-Min (born January 8, 1976) is a South Korean footballer. He played for FC Seoul.
