= Victor Shaka =

Nigerian footballer (born 1975)

Victor Shakaa
Personal information
- Full name: Victor Shakaa
- Date of birth: 1 May 1975 (age 51)
- Place of birth: Nigeria
- Position: Forward

Senior career*
Years	Team	Apps	(Gls)
1995–1997	Nigerdock		
1997	Trabzonspor		
1997–1999	Anyang LG Cheetahs	40	(9)
1999–2000	Ulsan Hyundai Horangi	25	(8)
2001–2002	Busan I'cons	5	(2)
2003–2004	Happy Valley AA	38	(6)

International career^{‡}
2001	Nigeria	1	(0)
- * Club domestic league appearances and goals as of 8 October 2007 ‡ National team caps and goals as of 8 October 2007

Victor Shaka (born 1 May 1975) is a Nigerian footballer who plays as a forward. His previous club is include Trabzonspor, Happy Valley AA in Hong Kong. He also played for FC Seoul, Ulsan Hyundai Horangi and Busan I'Cons of the South Korean K League.
