= A3 Champions Cup =

- Founded: 2002
- Abolished: 2008
- Region: East Asia
- Teams: 4
- Website: www.a3cup.com

A3 Champions Cup (also known as East Asian Champions Cup) was an annual football (soccer) tournament jointly organized by the China PR, Japan and Korea Republic football Association. It began in 2003, involving the league champions of China, Japan and South Korea. The host nation also invited an additional team, making this a four team tournament. South Korea was the most successful country in this tournament. Their representatives won the tournament three times.

It had been suggested that the league champion from Australia be added to the cup in the future. However, financial problems with the sponsor placed the tournament into question. It was reported that Japan's champion may not participate in the 2008 edition, since Urawa were not paid their appearance fee in 2007. The tournament was canceled on 23 September 2008 due to the sponsor's bankruptcy.

== Past results ==
Season	Venue	Champions	Runners-up	3rd	4th
2003	(Japan) Tokyo	(Japan) Kashima Antlers †	(China) Dalian Shide	(South Korea) Seongnam Ilhwa Chunma	(Japan) Júbilo Iwata
2004	(China) Shanghai	(South Korea) Seongnam Ilhwa Chunma	(Japan) Yokohama F. Marinos	(China) Shanghai Shenhua	(China) Inter Shanghai †
2005	(South Korea) Jeju	(South Korea) Suwon Samsung Bluewings	(South Korea) Pohang Steelers †	(Japan) Yokohama F. Marinos	(China) Shenzhen Kingway
2006	(Japan) Tokyo	(South Korea) Ulsan Hyundai Horang-i	(Japan) Gamba Osaka	(Japan) JEF United Chiba †	(China) Dalian Shide
2007	(China) Jinan	(China) Shanghai Shenhua †	(China) Shandong Luneng Taishan	(Japan) Urawa Red Diamonds	(South Korea) Seongnam Ilhwa Chunma

† = did not qualify as league champions.

=== Records ===
- Top Scorer:

2005: (Brazil) Nadson (6 goals)
2006: (South Korea) Lee Chun-soo (6 goals)
