= AFC Asian Cup records and statistics =

This is a list of records and statistics of the AFC Asian Cup.

== General statistics by tournament ==
| Year | Host(s) | Winners | Winning coach | Top scorer(s) (goals) | Best player award |
|---|---|---|---|---|---|
| 1956 | Hong Kong | South Korea | (South Korea) Kim Sung-gan | (Israel) Nahum Stelmach (4) | —N/a |
| 1960 | South Korea | South Korea | (South Korea) Kim Yong-sik | (South Korea) Cho Yoon-ok (4) | —N/a |
| 1964 | Israel | Israel | (Israel) Yosef Merimovich | (India) Inder Singh (2) (Israel) Mordechai Spiegler (2) | —N/a |
| 1968 | Iran | Iran | (Iran) Mahmoud Bayati | (Iran) Homayoun Behzadi (4) (Israel) Moshe Romano (4) (Israel) Giora Spiegel (4) | —N/a |
| 1972 | Thailand | Iran | (Iran) Mohammad Ranjbar | (Iran) Hossein Kalani (5) | (Iran) Ebrahim Ashtiani |
| 1976 | Iran | Iran | (Iran) Heshmat Mohajerani | (Iran) Gholam Hossein Mazloumi (3) (Iran) Nasser Nouraei (3) (Kuwait) Fathi Kamel (3) | (Iran) Ali Parvin |
| 1980 | Kuwait | Kuwait | (Brazil) Carlos Alberto Parreira | (Iran) Behtash Fariba (7) (South Korea) Choi Soon-ho (7) | —N/a |
| 1984 | Singapore | Saudi Arabia | (Saudi Arabia) Khalil Al-Zayani | (China) Jia Xiuquan (3) (Iran) Shahrokh Bayani (3) (Iran) Nasser Mohammadkhani (3) | (China) Jia Xiuquan |
| 1988 | Qatar | Saudi Arabia | (Brazil) Carlos Alberto Parreira | (South Korea) Lee Tae-ho (3) | (South Korea) Kim Joo-sung |
| 1992 | Japan | Japan | (Netherlands) Hans Ooft | (Saudi Arabia) Fahad Al-Bishi (3) | (Japan) Kazuyoshi Miura |
| 1996 | United Arab Emirates | Saudi Arabia | (Portugal) Nelo Vingada | (Iran) Ali Daei (8) | (Iran) Khodadad Azizi |
| 2000 | Lebanon | Japan | (France) Philippe Troussier | (South Korea) Lee Dong-gook (6) | (Japan) Hiroshi Nanami |
| 2004 | China | Japan | (Brazil) Zico | (Bahrain) A'ala Hubail (5) (Iran) Ali Karimi (5) | (Japan) Shunsuke Nakamura |
| 2007 | Indonesia; Malaysia; Thailand; Vietnam | Iraq | (Brazil) Jorvan Vieira | (Iraq) Younis Mahmoud (4) (Japan) Naohiro Takahara (4) (Saudi Arabia) Yasser Al-Qahtani (4) | (Iraq) Younis Mahmoud |
| 2011 | Qatar | Japan | (Italy) Alberto Zaccheroni | (South Korea) Koo Ja-cheol (5) | (Japan) Keisuke Honda |
| 2015 | Australia | Australia | (Australia) Ange Postecoglou | (United Arab Emirates) Ali Mabkhout (5) | (Australia) Massimo Luongo |
| 2019 | United Arab Emirates | Qatar | (Spain) Félix Sánchez | (Qatar) Almoez Ali (9) | (Qatar) Almoez Ali |
| 2023 | Qatar | Qatar | (Spain) Tintín Márquez | (Qatar) Akram Afif (8) | (Qatar) Akram Afif |
| 2027 | Saudi Arabia | TBD | TBD | TBD | TBD |

== Debut of national teams ==
As of 2027, Afghanistan, Bhutan, Brunei, Guam, Laos, Macau, Maldives, Mongolia, Northern Mariana Islands, Nepal, Pakistan, Sri Lanka, and Timor-Leste are yet to make their debut in the tournament.

| Year | Debuting teams | | | Successor teams |
| Year | Teams | No. | Cum. | Successor teams |
|---|---|---|---|---|
| 1956 | Hong Kong, Israel, South Korea, South Vietnam | 4 | 4 | |
| 1960 | Taiwan | 1 | 5 | |
| 1964 | India | 1 | 6 | |
| 1968 | Iran, Burma | 2 | 8 | |
| 1972 | Iraq, Khmer Republic, Kuwait, Thailand | 4 | 12 | |
| 1976 | China, Malaysia, South Yemen | 3 | 15 | |
| 1980 | Bangladesh, North Korea, Qatar, Syria, United Arab Emirates | 5 | 20 | |
| 1984 | Saudi Arabia, Singapore | 2 | 22 | |
| 1988 | Bahrain, Japan | 2 | 24 | |
| 1992 | None | 0 | 24 | |
| 1996 | Indonesia, Uzbekistan | 2 | 26 | |
| 2000 | Lebanon | 1 | 27 | |
| 2004 | Jordan, Oman, Turkmenistan | 3 | 30 | |
| 2007 | Australia | 1 | 31 | Vietnam |
| 2011 | None | 0 | 31 | |
| 2015 | Palestine | 1 | 32 | |
| 2019 | Kyrgyzstan, Philippines, Yemen | 3 | 35 | |
| 2023 | Tajikistan | 1 | 36 | |
| 2027 | None | 0 | 36 | |

== Overall team records ==
In this ranking 3 points are awarded for a win, 1 for a draw and 0 for a loss. As per statistical convention in football, matches decided in extra time are counted as wins and losses, while matches decided by penalty shoot-outs are counted as draws. Teams are ranked by total points, then by goal difference, then by goals scored.

As of 2023 AFC Asian Cup

| Rank | Team | Part | Pld | W | D | L | GF | GA | GD | Pts |
|---|---|---|---|---|---|---|---|---|---|---|
| 1 | Iran | 16 | 74 | 45 | 20 | 9 | 143 | 55 | +88 | 155 |
| 2 | South Korea | 16 | 73 | 38 | 19 | 16 | 117 | 74 | +43 | 133 |
| 3 | Japan | 11 | 53 | 33 | 12 | 8 | 104 | 52 | +52 | 111 |
| 4 | Saudi Arabia | 11 | 52 | 23 | 15 | 14 | 74 | 50 | +24 | 84 |
| 5 | China | 13 | 59 | 23 | 15 | 21 | 88 | 66 | +22 | 84 |
| 6 | Qatar | 11 | 46 | 19 | 12 | 15 | 66 | 52 | +14 | 69 |
| 7 | Iraq | 10 | 42 | 18 | 8 | 17 | 54 | 52 | +2 | 62 |
| 8 | United Arab Emirates | 11 | 48 | 16 | 13 | 19 | 47 | 64 | −17 | 61 |
| 9 | Kuwait | 10 | 42 | 15 | 10 | 17 | 47 | 51 | −4 | 55 |
| 10 | Uzbekistan | 8 | 33 | 15 | 7 | 11 | 49 | 50 | −1 | 52 |
| 11 | Australia | 5 | 26 | 15 | 5 | 6 | 49 | 17 | +32 | 50 |
| 12 | Jordan | 5 | 22 | 10 | 7 | 5 | 30 | 18 | +12 | 37 |
| 13 | Syria | 7 | 25 | 8 | 5 | 12 | 19 | 30 | −11 | 29 |
| 14 | Israel | 4 | 13 | 9 | 0 | 4 | 28 | 15 | +13 | 27 |
| 15 | Bahrain | 7 | 27 | 7 | 6 | 14 | 33 | 44 | −11 | 27 |
| 16 | Thailand | 8 | 28 | 3 | 11 | 14 | 22 | 54 | −32 | 20 |
| 17 | Oman | 5 | 16 | 3 | 5 | 8 | 12 | 20 | −8 | 14 |
| 18 | North Korea | 5 | 18 | 3 | 2 | 13 | 15 | 40 | −25 | 11 |
| 19 | Indonesia | 5 | 16 | 3 | 2 | 11 | 13 | 38 | −25 | 11 |
| 20 | India | 5 | 16 | 3 | 1 | 12 | 12 | 33 | −21 | 10 |
| 21 | Vietnam (Note: Including results representing South Vietnam.) | 5 | 18 | 2 | 3 | 13 | 21 | 43 | −22 | 9 |
| 22 | Myanmar | 1 | 4 | 2 | 1 | 1 | 5 | 4 | +1 | 7 |
| 23 | Malaysia | 4 | 12 | 1 | 4 | 7 | 10 | 28 | −18 | 7 |
| 24 | Lebanon | 3 | 9 | 1 | 3 | 5 | 8 | 17 | −9 | 6 |
| 25 | Palestine | 3 | 10 | 1 | 3 | 6 | 7 | 21 | −14 | 6 |
| 26 | Tajikistan | 1 | 5 | 1 | 2 | 2 | 3 | 4 | −1 | 5 |
| 27 | Chinese Taipei | 2 | 7 | 1 | 2 | 4 | 5 | 12 | −7 | 5 |
| 28 | Singapore | 1 | 4 | 1 | 1 | 2 | 3 | 4 | −1 | 4 |
| 29 | Cambodia | 1 | 5 | 1 | 1 | 3 | 8 | 10 | −2 | 4 |
| 30 | Kyrgyzstan | 2 | 7 | 1 | 1 | 5 | 7 | 12 | −5 | 4 |
| 31 | Hong Kong | 4 | 13 | 0 | 3 | 10 | 10 | 30 | −20 | 3 |
| 32 | Turkmenistan | 2 | 6 | 0 | 1 | 5 | 7 | 16 | −9 | 1 |
| 33 | Philippines | 1 | 3 | 0 | 0 | 3 | 1 | 7 | −6 | 0 |
| 34 | South Yemen | 1 | 2 | 0 | 0 | 2 | 0 | 9 | −9 | 0 |
| 35 | Yemen | 1 | 3 | 0 | 0 | 3 | 0 | 10 | −10 | 0 |
| 36 | Bangladesh | 1 | 4 | 0 | 0 | 4 | 2 | 17 | −15 | 0 |

Only 13 teams have not yet participated in the Asian Cup:

- Afghanistan
- Bhutan
- Brunei
- Guam
- Laos
- Macau
- Mongolia
- Maldives
- Nepal
- Northern Mariana Islands
- Pakistan
- Sri Lanka
- Timor-Leste

== Teams reaching the top four ==
The first four editions only had four or five teams and played in one single group. Since 1972, the final tournament has introduced the knockout stage. Since 2019, no third place play-off has been played. Since 2023, losing semi-finalists are ranked by the AFC based on goal difference in the semi-finals.

Bold text denotes team was host country.

| Team | Champions | Runners-up | Third place | Fourth place | Semi-finalist | Top 4 total |
|---|---|---|---|---|---|---|
| Japan | 4 (**1992**, 2000, 2004, 2011) | 1 (2019) | —N/a | 1 (2007) | —N/a | 6 |
| Saudi Arabia | 3 (1984, 1988, 1996) | 3 (1992, 2000, 2007) | —N/a | —N/a | —N/a | 6 |
| Iran | 3 (**1968**, 1972, **1976**) | —N/a | 4 (1980, 1988, 1996, 2004) | 1 (1984) | 1 (2019, 2023) | 10 |
| South Korea | 2 (1956, **1960**) | 4 (1972, 1980, 1988, 2015) | 4 (1964, 2000, 2007, 2011) | —N/a | 1 (2023) | 11 |
| Qatar | 2 (2019, **2023**) | —N/a | —N/a | —N/a | —N/a | 2 |
| Israel | 1 (**1964**) | 2 (1956, 1960) | 1 (1968) | —N/a | —N/a | 4 |
| Kuwait | 1 (**1980**) | 1 (1976) | 1 (1984) | 1 (1996) | —N/a | 4 |
| Australia | 1 (**2015**) | 1 (2011) | —N/a | —N/a | —N/a | 2 |
| Iraq | 1 (2007) | —N/a | —N/a | 2 (1976, 2015) | —N/a | 3 |
| China | —N/a | 2 (1984, **2004**) | 2 (1976, 1992) | 2 (1988, 2000) | —N/a | 6 |
| United Arab Emirates | —N/a | 1 (**1996**) | 1 (2015) | 1 (1992) | 1 (**2019**) | 4 |
| India | —N/a | 1 (1964) | —N/a | —N/a | —N/a | 1 |
| Myanmar (Note: Burma until 1989.) | —N/a | 1 (1968) | —N/a | —N/a | —N/a | 1 |
| Jordan | —N/a | 1 (2023) | —N/a | —N/a | —N/a | 1 |
| Hong Kong | —N/a | —N/a | 1 (**1956**) | 1 (1964) | —N/a | 2 |
| Chinese Taipei (Note: Taiwan until 1980.) | —N/a | —N/a | 1 (1960) | 1 (1968) | —N/a | 2 |
| Thailand | —N/a | —N/a | 1 (**1972**) | —N/a | —N/a | 1 |
| Vietnam | —N/a | —N/a | —N/a | 2 (1956, 1960) | —N/a | 2 |
| Cambodia (Note: Khmer Republic from 1970 to 1975.) | —N/a | —N/a | —N/a | 1 (1972) | —N/a | 1 |
| North Korea | —N/a | —N/a | —N/a | 1 (1980) | —N/a | 1 |
| Bahrain | —N/a | —N/a | —N/a | 1 (2004) | —N/a | 1 |
| Uzbekistan | —N/a | —N/a | —N/a | 1 (2011) | —N/a | 1 |

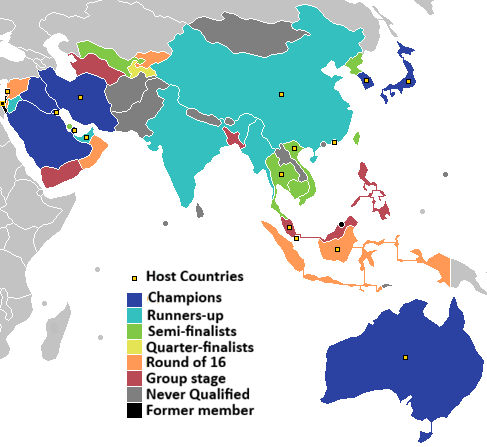

== Comprehensive team results by tournament ==
Legend

- 1st – Champions
- 2nd – Runners-up
- 3rd – Third place
- 4th – Fourth place
- SF – Semi-finals
- QF – Quarter-finals
- R16 – Round of 16
- GS – Group stage
- Q – Qualified for upcoming tournament
- •• — Qualified but withdrew / Disqualified after qualification
- • — Did not qualify
- × — Did not enter / Withdrew from the Asian Cup
- — Hosts

For each tournament, the number of teams in each finals tournament are shown (in parentheses).

| Team | (British Hong Kong) 1956 (4) | (South Korea) 1960 (4) | (Israel) 1964 (4) | (Iran) 1968 (5) | (Thailand) 1972 (6) | (Iran) 1976 (6) | (Kuwait) 1980 (10) | (Singapore) 1984 (10) | (Qatar) 1988 (10) | (Japan) 1992 (8) | (United Arab Emirates) 1996 (12) | (Lebanon) 2000 (12) | (China) 2004 (16) | (Indonesia) (Malaysia) (Thailand) (Vietnam) 2007 (16) | (Qatar) 2011 (16) | (Australia) 2015 (16) | (United Arab Emirates) 2019 (24) | (Qatar) 2023 (24) | (Saudi Arabia) 2027 (24) | Total |
|---|---|---|---|---|---|---|---|---|---|---|---|---|---|---|---|---|---|---|---|---|
West Asian members
| Bahrain | Part of UK | | | × | • | × | •• | × | GS | • | × | • | 4th | GS | GS | GS | R16 | R16 | Q | 8 |
| Iraq | Not an AFC member | | | | GS | 4th | × | × | × | × | QF | QF | QF | 1st | QF | 4th | R16 | R16 | Q | 11 |
| Jordan | Not an AFC member | | | | • | × | × | • | • | × | • | • | QF | • | QF | GS | R16 | 2nd | Q | 6 |
| Kuwait | Not an AFC member | | | × | GS | 2nd | 1st | 3rd | GS | • | 4th | QF | GS | • | GS | GS | × | • | Q | 11 |
| Lebanon | Not an AFC member | | | × | • | × | • | × | × | × | • | GS | • | × | • | • | GS | GS | • | 3 |
| Oman | Not an AFC member | | | | | | | • | × | • | • | • | GS | GS | • | GS | R16 | GS | Q | 6 |
| Palestine | Not an AFC member | | | | | | | | | | | • | • | • | • | GS | GS | R16 | Q | 4 |
| Qatar | Part of United Kingdom | | | | | • | GS | GS | GS | GS | • | QF | GS | GS | QF | GS | 1st | 1st | Q | 12 |
| Saudi Arabia | Not an AFC member | | | | | •• | × | 1st | 1st | 2nd | 1st | 2nd | GS | 2nd | GS | GS | R16 | R16 | Q | 12 |
| Syria | Not an AFC member | | | | • | × | GS | GS | GS | • | GS | • | • | • | GS | • | GS | R16 | Q | 8 |
| United Arab Emirates | Part of United Kingdom | | | | | × | GS | GS | GS | 4th | 2nd | • | GS | GS | GS | 3rd | SF | R16 | Q | 12 |
| Yemen | Not an AFC member | | | | | | | • | • | × | • | • | • | • | • | • | GS | • | Q | 2 |
Central Asian members
| Iran | × | • | × | 1st | 1st | 1st | 3rd | 4th | 3rd | GS | 3rd | QF | 3rd | QF | QF | QF | SF | 3rd | Q | 16 |
| Kyrgyzstan | Part of Soviet Union | | | | | | | | | | • | • | • | × | • | • | R16 | GS | Q | 3 |
| Tajikistan | Part of Soviet Union | | | | | | | | | | • | • | • | × | • | • | • | QF | Q | 2 |
| Turkmenistan | Part of Soviet Union | | | | | | | | | | • | • | GS | × | • | • | GS | • | • | 2 |
| Uzbekistan | Part of Soviet Union | | | | | | | | | | GS | GS | QF | QF | 4th | QF | R16 | QF | Q | 9 |
South Asian members
| Bangladesh | Part of Pakistan | | | | | × | GS | • | • | • | × | • | • | • | • | • | • | • | • | 1 |
| India | × | • | 2nd | • | × | × | × | GS | • | • | • | • | • | • | GS | • | GS | GS | • | 5 |
East Asian members
| China | Not an AFC member | | | | | 3rd | GS | 2nd | 4th | 3rd | QF | 4th | 2nd | GS | GS | QF | QF | GS | Q | 14 |
| Chinese Taipei | • | 3rd | × | 4th | × | × | OFC member | | | • | • | • | • | • | • | • | • | • | • | 2 |
| Hong Kong | 3rd | • | 4th | 5th | • | • | • | • | • | • | • | • | • | • | • | • | • | GS | • | 4 |
| Japan | × | × | × | • | × | • | × | × | GS | 1st | QF | 1st | 1st | 4th | 1st | QF | 2nd | QF | Q | 11 |
| North Korea | Not an AFC member | | | | | •• | 4th | × | • | GS | × | • | • | × | GS | GS | GS | × | Q | 6 |
| South Korea | 1st | 1st | 3rd | • | 2nd | • | 2nd | GS | 2nd | • | QF | 3rd | QF | 3rd | 3rd | 2nd | QF | 4th | Q | 16 |
Southeast Asian members
| Australia | OFC member | | | | | | | | | | | | | QF | 2nd | 1st | QF | QF | Q | 6 |
| Cambodia | • | × | × | • | 4th | × | × | × | × | × | × | • | × | × | • | • | • | • | • | 1 |
| Indonesia | × | × | × | • | • | • | • | • | • | • | GS | GS | GS | GS | • | • | × | R16 | Q | 6 |
| Malaysia | • | • | • | • | • | GS | GS | • | • | • | • | • | • | GS | • | • | • | GS | • | 4 |
| Myanmar | × | × | × | 2nd | × | × | × | × | × | × | • | • | • | × | • | • | • | • | • | 1 |
| Philippines | • | • | × | • | × | × | • | • | × | × | • | • | × | × | • | • | GS | • | • | 1 |
| Singapore | × | • | × | • | × | • | • | GS | × | • | • | • | • | • | • | • | • | • | Q | 2 |
| Thailand | × | × | • | • | 3rd | •• | • | • | • | GS | GS | GS | GS | GS | • | • | R16 | R16 | Q | 9 |
| Vietnam | 4th | 4th | • | • | • | • | × | × | × | × | • | • | • | QF | • | • | QF | GS | Q | 6 |
Former AFC members
| Israel | 2nd | 2nd | 1st | 3rd | •• | Expelled from AFC | | | | | UEFA member | | | | | | | | | 4 |
| South Yemen | | | | | | GS | × | × | • | Part of Yemen | | | | | | | | | | 1 |

== Teams yet to qualify for finals ==
The following teen teams which are current AFC members have never qualified for the AFC Asian Cup.

Legend

- • – Did not qualify
- × – Did not enter / withdrew / banned

For each tournament, the number of teams in each finals tournament (in brackets) are shown.

| Team | (British Hong Kong) 1956 (4) | (South Korea) 1960 (4) | (Israel) 1964 (4) | (Iran) 1968 (5) | (Thailand) 1972 (6) | (Iran) 1976 (6) | (Kuwait) 1980 (10) | (Singapore) 1984 (10) | (Qatar) 1988 (10) | (Japan) 1992 (8) | (United Arab Emirates) 1996 (12) | (Lebanon) 2000 (12) | (China) 2004 (16) | (Indonesia) (Malaysia) (Thailand) (Vietnam) 2007 (16) | (Qatar) 2011 (16) | (Australia) 2015 (16) | (United Arab Emirates) 2019 (24) | (Qatar) 2023 (24) | (Saudi Arabia) 2027 (24) | Attempts |
|---|---|---|---|---|---|---|---|---|---|---|---|---|---|---|---|---|---|---|---|---|
| Afghanistan | × | × | × | × | × | • | • | • | × | × | × | × | • | × | × | • | • | • | • | 8 |
| Bhutan | × | × | × | × | × | × | × | × | × | × | × | • | • | × | × | × | • | • | • | 5 |
| Brunei | × | × | × | × | • | • | × | × | × | × | × | • | • | × | • | × | • | • | • | 8 |
| Guam | | | | | | | | | | × | • | • | • | × | • | • | • | • | • | 8 |
| Laos | × | × | × | × | × | × | × | × | × | × | × | • | • | × | × | • | • | • | • | 6 |
| Macau | × | × | × | × | × | × | • | × | × | • | • | • | • | × | • | • | • | • | • | 10 |
| Mongolia | × | × | × | × | × | × | × | × | × | × | × | • | • | × | • | • | • | • | • | 7 |
| Maldives | Part of UK | | | × | × | × | × | × | × | × | • | • | • | × | • | • | • | • | • | 8 |
| Nepal | | | | | × | × | × | • | • | × | • | • | • | × | × | • | • | • | • | 9 |
| Northern Mariana Islands | | | | | | | | | | | | | | | × | • | × | × | × | 1 |
| Pakistan | × | • | × | • | × | × | × | • | • | • | • | • | • | • | • | • | • | • | • | 14 |
| Sri Lanka | × | × | × | × | • | × | • | • | × | × | • | • | • | × | • | • | • | • | • | 11 |
| Timor-Leste | Part of Portugal | | | | | Part of Indonesia | | | | | | Did not exist, under United Nations | • | × | × | × | • | • | • | 4 |

== Drought ==
| Team | Last Appearance | Number of missed tournaments |
|---|---|---|
| Chinese Taipei | 1968 | 15 |
| Myanmar | 1968 | 15 |
| Cambodia | 1972 | 14 |
| Bangladesh | 1980 | 12 |
| Philippines | 2019 | 2 |
| Turkmenistan | 2019 | 2 |
| Hong Kong | 2023 | 1 |
| India | 2023 | 1 |
| Lebanon | 2023 | 1 |
| Malaysia | 2023 | 1 |

== Streaks ==
| Team | Qualified since | Number of participations |
|---|---|---|
| Iran | 1968 | 16 |
| China | 1976 | 14 |
| Saudi Arabia | 1984 | 12 |
| Japan | 1988 | 11 |
| Iraq | 1996 | 9 |
| South Korea | 1996 | 9 |
| Uzbekistan | 1996 | 9 |
| Qatar | 2000 | 8 |
| Bahrain | 2004 | 7 |
| United Arab Emirates | 2004 | 7 |
| Australia | 2007 | 6 |
| Jordan | 2011 | 5 |
| Oman | 2015 | 4 |
| Palestine | 2015 | 4 |
| Kyrgyzstan | 2019 | 3 |
| Syria | 2019 | 3 |
| Thailand | 2019 | 3 |
| Vietnam | 2019 | 3 |
| Indonesia | 2023 | 2 |
| Tajikistan | 2023 | 2 |
| Kuwait | 2027 | 1 |
| North Korea | 2027 | 1 |
| Singapore | 2027 | 1 |
| Yemen | 2027 | 1 |

== Results of host nations ==
| Year | Host nation | Finish |
|---|---|---|
| 1956 | Hong Kong | Third place |
| 1960 | South Korea | Champions |
| 1964 | Israel | Champions |
| 1968 | Iran | Champions |
| 1972 | Thailand | Third place |
| 1976 | Iran | Champions |
| 1980 | Kuwait | Champions |
| 1984 | Singapore | Group stage |
| 1988 | Qatar | Group stage |
| 1992 | Japan | Champions |
| 1996 | United Arab Emirates | Runners-up |
| 2000 | Lebanon | Group stage |
| 2004 | China | Runners-up |
| 2007 | Indonesia | Group stage |
| 2007 | Malaysia | Group stage |
| 2007 | Thailand | Group stage |
| 2007 | Vietnam | Quarter-finals |
| 2011 | Qatar | Quarter-finals |
| 2015 | Australia | Champions |
| 2019 | United Arab Emirates | Semi-finals |
| 2023 | Qatar | Champions |
| 2027 | Saudi Arabia | TBD |

== Results of defending finalists ==
| Year | Defending champions | Finish | Defending runners-up | Finish |
|---|---|---|---|---|
| 1960 | South Korea | Champions | Israel | Runners-up |
| 1964 | South Korea | Third place | Israel | Champions |
| 1968 | Israel | Third place | India | did not qualify |
| 1972 | Iran | Champions | Burma | Withdrew |
| 1976 | Iran | Champions | South Korea | did not qualify |
| 1980 | Iran | Third place | Kuwait | Champions |
| 1984 | Kuwait | Third place | South Korea | Group Stage |
| 1988 | Saudi Arabia | Champions | China | Fourth Place |
| 1992 | Saudi Arabia | Runners-up | South Korea | did not qualify |
| 1996 | Japan | Quarter-finals | Saudi Arabia | Champions |
| 2000 | Saudi Arabia | Runners-up | United Arab Emirates | did not qualify |
| 2004 | Japan | Champions | Saudi Arabia | Group stage |
| 2007 | Japan | Fourth place | China | Group stage |
| 2011 | Iraq | Quarter-finals | Saudi Arabia | Group stage |
| 2015 | Japan | Quarter-finals | Australia | Champions |
| 2019 | Australia | Quarter-finals | South Korea | Quarter-finals |
| 2023 | Qatar | Champions | Japan | Quarter-finals |
| 2027 | Qatar | TBD | Jordan | TBD |

== Other records ==
- Only three teams have won the tournament in their debut appearances:
  - South Korea (1956)
  - Iran (1968)
  - Saudi Arabia (1984)
- Iran hold the record for the most games played, with 74.
- Only Iran have won three consecutive AFC Asian Cup.

== Individual records ==
=== Overall top goalscorers ===
Players in bold are still active at international level.

| Rank | Player | Country | Years | Goals |
|---|---|---|---|---|
| 1 | Ali Daei | Iran | 1996, 2000, 2004 | 14 |
| 2 | **Almoez Ali** | Qatar | 2019, 2023 | 11 |
| 3 | Lee Dong-gook | South Korea | 2000, 2004, 2007 | 10 |
| 4 | Naohiro Takahara | Japan | 2000, 2007 | 9 |
| 4 | Ali Mabkhout | United Arab Emirates | 2015, 2019, 2023 | 9 |
| 4 | **Akram Afif** | Qatar | 2019, 2023 | 9 |
| 7 | Jasem Al-Huwaidi | Kuwait | 1996, 2000 | 8 |
| 7 | Younis Mahmoud | Iraq | 2004, 2007, 2011, 2015 | 8 |
| 7 | **Sardar Azmoun** | Iran | 2015, 2019, 2023 | 8 |
| 10 | Hossein Kalani | Iran | 1968, 1972 | 7 |
| 10 | Faisal Al-Dakhil | Kuwait | 1976, 1980, 1984 | 7 |
| 10 | Behtash Fariba | Iran | 1980 | 7 |
| 10 | Choi Soon-ho | South Korea | 1980 | 7 |
| 10 | **Son Heung-min** | South Korea | 2011, 2015, 2019, 2023 | 7 |
| 15 | Yasser Al-Qahtani | Saudi Arabia | 2004, 2007, 2011 | 6 |
| 15 | Alexander Geynrikh | Uzbekistan | 2004, 2007, 2011 | 6 |
| 15 | Tim Cahill | Australia | 2007, 2011, 2015 | 6 |
| 15 | Ahmed Khalil | United Arab Emirates | 2011, 2015, 2019 | 6 |
| 15 | **Aymen Hussein** | Iraq | 2023 | 6 |
| 15 | **Mehdi Taremi** | Iran | 2019, 2023 | 6 |
| 22 | Woo Sang-kwon | South Korea | 1956, 1960 | 5 |
| 22 | Nahum Stelmach | Israel | 1956, 1960, 1964 | 5 |
| 22 | Ali Jabbari | Iran | 1968, 1972 | 5 |
| 22 | Chung Hae-won | South Korea | 1980, 1988 | 5 |
| 22 | Hwang Sun-hong | South Korea | 1988, 1996 | 5 |
| 22 | Akinori Nishizawa | Japan | 2000 | 5 |
| 22 | Shao Jiayi | China | 2000, 2004, 2007 | 5 |
| 22 | Ali Karimi | Iran | 2000, 2004, 2007 | 5 |
| 22 | A'ala Hubail | Bahrain | 2004, 2007 | 5 |
| 22 | Ismail Abdullatif | Bahrain | 2007, 2011, 2015 | 5 |
| 22 | Koo Ja-cheol | South Korea | 2011, 2015, 2019 | 5 |
| 22 | **Hassan Al-Haydos** | Qatar | 2011, 2015, 2019, 2023 | 5 |

=== Top goalscorers in one tournament ===
Players in bold are still active at international level.

| Goals | Player | Country | Year | Ref. |
|---|---|---|---|---|
| 9 | **Almoez Ali** | Qatar | 2019 | |
| 8 | Ali Daei | Iran | 1996 | |
| 8 | **Akram Afif** | Qatar | 2023 | |
| 7 | Behtash Fariba | Iran | 1980 | |
| 7 | Choi Soon-ho | South Korea | 1980 | |
| 6 | Lee Dong-gook | South Korea | 2000 | |
| 6 | **Aymen Hussein** | Iraq | 2023 | |
| 5 | Hossein Kalani | Iran | 1972 | |
| 5 | Ali Karimi | Iran | 2004 | |
| 5 | A'ala Hubail | Bahrain | 2004 | |
| 5 | Koo Ja-cheol | South Korea | 2011 | |
| 5 | Ali Mabkhout | United Arab Emirates | 2015 | |

=== Most tournament wins ===
| Wins | Player | Country | Years |
|---|---|---|---|
| 3 | Parviz Ghelichkhani | Iran | 1968, 1972, 1976 |

=== Most tournament appearances ===
The table lists the players who have appeared in four or more different tournaments.

| Tournaments | Player | Years |
|---|---|---|
| 5 | (Uzbekistan) Ignatiy Nesterov | 2004, 2007, 2011, 2015, 2019 |
| 4 | (United Arab Emirates) Adnan Al-Talyani | 1984, 1988, 1992, 1996 |
| 4 | (China) Li Ming | 1992, 1996, 2000, 2004 |
| 4 | (Iran) Mehdi Mahdavikia | 1996, 2000, 2004, 2007 |
| 4 | (South Korea) Kim Yong-dae | 2000, 2004, 2007, 2011 |
| 4 | (Iran) Javad Nekounam | 2004, 2007, 2011, 2015 |
| 4 | (Iraq) Younis Mahmoud | 2004, 2007, 2011, 2015 |
| 4 | (Japan) Yasuhito Endō | 2004, 2007, 2011, 2015 |
| 4 | (Saudi Arabia) Saud Kariri | 2004, 2007, 2011, 2015 |
| 4 | (Qatar) Bilal Mohammed | 2004, 2007, 2011, 2015 |
| 4 | (Uzbekistan) Server Djeparov | 2004, 2007, 2011, 2015 |
| 4 | (Uzbekistan) Timur Kapadze | 2004, 2007, 2011, 2015 |
| 4 | (China) Zheng Zhi | 2004, 2007, 2015, 2019 |
| 4 | (Oman) Ahmed Kano | 2004, 2007, 2015, 2019 |
| 4 | (Jordan) Amer Shafi | 2004, 2011, 2015, 2019 |
| 4 | (United Arab Emirates) Ismail Matar | 2004, 2007, 2011, 2019 |
| 4 | (Uzbekistan) Marat Bikmaev | 2004, 2007, 2011, 2019 |
| 4 | (Iran) Masoud Shojaei | 2007, 2011, 2015, 2019 |
| 4 | (Saudi Arabia) Waleed Abdullah | 2007, 2011, 2015, 2019 |
| 4 | (Uzbekistan) Anzur Ismailov | 2007, 2011, 2015, 2019 |
| 4 | (China) Zhang Linpeng | 2011, 2015, 2019, 2023 |
| 4 | (Iran) Ehsan Hajsafi | 2011, 2015, 2019, 2023 |
| 4 | (Iran) Karim Ansarifard | 2011, 2015, 2019, 2023 |
| 4 | (South Korea) Son Heung-min | 2011, 2015, 2019, 2023 |
| 4 | (Qatar) Hassan Al-Haydos | 2011, 2015, 2019, 2023 |
| 4 | (Qatar) Saad Al-Sheeb | 2011, 2015, 2019, 2023 |

Younis Mahmoud is the only player in the history of the tournament to score a goal in four separate tournaments.

=== Fastest goals scored from kick-off ===
Only three goals in the history of the tournament have been scored in the first minute of their respective games.

- (United Arab Emirates) Ali Mabkhout (against Bahrain) at the 2015 edition in **14 seconds**
- (Kuwait) Fathi Kameel (against China PR) at the 1976 edition in **20 seconds**
- (China) Xie Yuxin (against Japan) at the 1992 edition in **20 seconds**

== Match records ==
=== Attendance by year ===
| Year | Matches | Attendance | | | | |
| Year | Matches | Total | Average | Highest | Round | Attendance |
|---|---|---|---|---|---|---|
| 1992 | 16 | 316,496 | 19,781 | JPN – KSA | Final | 60,000 |
| 1996 | 26 | 448,000 | 17,231 | IRN – KUW UAE – KSA | Third place match Final | 60,000 |
| 2000 | 26 | 276,488 | 10,634 | LBN – IRN | Group stage | 52,418 |
| 2004 | 32 | 937,650 | 29,302 | CHN – JPN | Final | 62,000 |
| 2007 | 32 | 724,222 | 22,632 | KSA – IDN IDN – KOR | Group stage | 88,000 |
| 2011 | 32 | 405,361 | 12,668 | QAT – UZB | Group stage | 47,413 |
| 2015 | 32 | 705,705 | 22,053 | KOR – AUS | Final | 76,385 |
| 2019 | 51 | 644,307 | 12,633 | UAE – IND | Group stage | 43,206 |
| 2023 | 51 | 1,507,790 | 29,565 | JOR – QAT | Final | 86,492 |

=== Highest attendance ===
- The highest ever attendance officially recorded was of 112,000 during the 1976 AFC Asian Cup final between Iran and Kuwait.

== Awards ==
=== Most Valuable Player ===
| Year | Player |
|---|---|
| 1956 | —N/a |
| 1960 | —N/a |
| 1964 | —N/a |
| 1968 | —N/a |
| 1972 | (Iran) Ebrahim Ashtiani |
| 1976 | (Iran) Ali Parvin |
| 1980 | —N/a |
| 1984 | (China) Jia Xiuquan |
| 1988 | (South Korea) Kim Joo-sung |
| 1992 | (Japan) Kazuyoshi Miura |
| 1996 | (Iran) Khodadad Azizi |
| 2000 | (Japan) Hiroshi Nanami |
| 2004 | (Japan) Shunsuke Nakamura |
| 2007 | (Iraq) Younis Mahmoud |
| 2011 | (Japan) Keisuke Honda |
| 2015 | (Australia) Massimo Luongo |
| 2019 | (Qatar) Almoez Ali |
| 2023 | (Qatar) Akram Afif |

=== Team of the Tournament ===
| Edition | Goalkeeper(s) | Defenders | Midfielders | Forwards |
|---|---|---|---|---|
| 1980 | (Iran) Nasser Hejazi | (Kuwait) Naeem Saad (Malaysia) Soh Chin Aun (Kuwait) Mahboub Juma'a (Iran) Mehdi Dinvarzadeh | (Iran) Abdolreza Barzegari (Kuwait) Saad Al-Houti (South Korea) Lee Young-moo | (South Korea) Choi Soon-ho (Kuwait) Faisal Al-Dakhil (Kuwait) Jasem Yaqoub |
| 1984 | Unknown or not awarded | | | |
| 1988 (18 players) | (China) Zhang Huikang (Saudi Arabia) Abdullah Al-Deayea | (Saudi Arabia) Mohamed Al-Jawad (Saudi Arabia) Saleh Nu'eimeh (South Korea) Park Kyung-hoon (South Korea) Chung Yong-hwan | (China) Xie Yuxin (United Arab Emirates) Mohamed Salim (Kuwait) Mahboub Juma'a (Iran) Sirous Ghayeghran (South Korea) Chung Hae-won (Qatar) Adel Khamis (Kuwait) Abdulaziz Al-Hajeri (South Korea) Byun Byung-joo | (Saudi Arabia) Youssef Al-Thunayan (Saudi Arabia) Majed Abdullah (South Korea) Kim Joo-sung (China) Wang Baoshan |
| 1992 | Unknown or not awarded | | | |
| 1996 | (Saudi Arabia) Mohamed Al-Deayea | (Saudi Arabia) Abdullah Zubromawi (United Arab Emirates) Yousef Saleh (Iran) Mohammad Khakpour | (Iran) Mehrdad Minavand (United Arab Emirates) Mohamed Ali (Saudi Arabia) Khalid Al-Muwallid (United Arab Emirates) Saad Bakheet Mubarak | (Saudi Arabia) Fahad Al-Mehallel (Kuwait) Jasem Al-Huwaidi (Iran) Ali Daei |
| 2000 | (China) Jiang Jin | (South Korea) Hong Myung-bo (Saudi Arabia) Mohammed Al-Khilaiwi (Kuwait) Jamal Mubarak | (Japan) Hiroshi Nanami (Saudi Arabia) Nawaf Al-Temyat (Iraq) Abbas Obeid (Iran) Karim Bagheri (Japan) Shunsuke Nakamura | (South Korea) Lee Dong-gook (Japan) Naohiro Takahara |
| 2004 | (Japan) Yoshikatsu Kawaguchi | (Japan) Tsuneyasu Miyamoto (Japan) Yuji Nakazawa (China) Zheng Zhi (Iran) Mehdi Mahdavikia | (Japan) Shunsuke Nakamura (China) Shao Jiayi (China) Zhao Junzhe (Bahrain) Talal Yousef | (Bahrain) A'ala Hubail (Iran) Ali Karimi |
| 2007 (fan-voted) | (South Korea) Lee Woon-jae | (Japan) Yuji Nakazawa (Australia) Lucas Neill (Iraq) Bassim Abbas (Iran) Rahman Rezaei | (Japan) Shunsuke Nakamura (Australia) Harry Kewell (South Korea) Lee Chun-soo (Iraq) Nashat Akram | (Japan) Naohiro Takahara (Saudi Arabia) Yasser Al-Qahtani |
| 2011 | Not awarded | | | |
| 2015 | (Australia) Mathew Ryan | (Iraq) Dhurgham Ismail (South Korea) Kwak Tae-hwi (Australia) Trent Sainsbury (South Korea) Cha Du-ri | (Australia) Massimo Luongo (United Arab Emirates) Omar Abdulrahman (South Korea) Ki Sung-yueng | (United Arab Emirates) Ali Mabkhout (Australia) Tim Cahill (South Korea) Son Heung-min |
| 2019 (23 players) | (Iran) Alireza Beiranvand (Japan) Shūichi Gonda (Qatar) Saad Al Sheeb | (United Arab Emirates) Bandar Al-Ahbabi (Qatar) Boualem Khoukhi (Japan) Maya Yoshida (Qatar) Bassam Al-Rawi (Japan) Yuto Nagatomo (Qatar) Abdelkarim Hassan (South Korea) Kim Min-jae | (Iran) Omid Ebrahimi (Qatar) Abdulaziz Hatem (Iran) Ashkan Dejagah (Australia) Tom Rogic (Japan) Gaku Shibasaki (Qatar) Hassan Al-Haydos | (Qatar) Akram Afif (Qatar) Almoez Ali (Iran) Sardar Azmoun (Vietnam) Nguyễn Quang Hải (China) Wu Lei (United Arab Emirates) Ali Mabkhout (Japan) Yuya Osako |

=== Fair play award ===
- First awarded in 1984

| Year | Winner |
|---|---|
| 1984 | China |
| 1988 | Not awarded |
| 1992 | Not awarded |
| 1996 | Iran |
| 2000 | Saudi Arabia |
| 2004 | China |
| 2007 | Japan |
| 2011 | South Korea |
| 2015 | Australia |
| 2019 | Japan |
| 2023 | Qatar |
