= AFC Asian Cup awards =

Association football awards

At the end of each AFC Asian Cup final tournament, several awards are presented to the players and teams which have distinguished themselves in various aspects of the competition.

== Awards ==
There are currently five post-tournament awards

- the Most Valuable Player for best player;
- the Top Goalscorer for most prolific goal scorer;
- the Best Goalkeeper for most outstanding goalkeeper;
- the Team of the Tournament for best combined team of players at the tournament;
- the Fair Play Award for the team with the best record of fair play.

== Most Valuable Player ==
| Year | Most Valuable Player | Ref. |
|---|---|---|
| 1956 | Not awarded | |
| 1960 | Not awarded | |
| 1964 | Not awarded | |
| 1968 | Not awarded | |
| 1972 | (Iran) Ebrahim Ashtiani | |
| 1976 | (Iran) Ali Parvin | |
| 1980 | Not awarded | |
| 1984 | (China) Jia Xiuquan | |
| 1988 | (South Korea) Kim Joo-sung | |
| 1992 | (Japan) Kazuyoshi Miura | |
| 1996 | (Iran) Khodadad Azizi | |
| 2000 | (Japan) Hiroshi Nanami | |
| 2004 | (Japan) Shunsuke Nakamura | |
| 2007 | (Iraq) Younis Mahmoud | |
| 2011 | (Japan) Keisuke Honda | |
| 2015 | (Australia) Massimo Luongo | |
| 2019 | (Qatar) Almoez Ali | |
| 2023 | (Qatar) Akram Afif | |

== Top Goalscorer ==
| Year | Top Goalscorer(s) | Goals | Ref. |
|---|---|---|---|
| 1956 | (Israel) Nahum Stelmach | 4 | |
| 1960 | (South Korea) Cho Yoon-ok | 4 | |
| 1964 | (India) Inder Singh (Israel) Mordechai Spiegler | 2 | |
| 1968 | (Iran) Homayoun Behzadi (Israel) Giora Spiegel (Israel) Moshe Romano | 4 | |
| 1972 | (Iran) Hossein Kalani | 5 | |
| 1976 | (Kuwait) Fathi Kameel (Iran) Gholam Hossein Mazloumi (Iran) Nasser Nouraei | 3 | |
| 1980 | (South Korea) Choi Soon-ho (Iran) Behtash Fariba | 7 | |
| 1984 | (China) Jia Xiuquan (Iran) Shahrokh Bayani (Iran) Nasser Mohammadkhani | 3 | |
| 1988 | (South Korea) Lee Tae-ho | 3 | |
| 1992 | (Saudi Arabia) Fahad Al-Bishi | 3 | |
| 1996 | (Iran) Ali Daei | 8 | |
| 2000 | (South Korea) Lee Dong-gook | 6 | |
| 2004 | (Iran) Ali Karimi (Bahrain) A'ala Hubail | 5 | |
| 2007 | (Iraq) Younis Mahmoud (Japan) Naohiro Takahara (Saudi Arabia) Yasser Al-Qahtani | 4 | |
| 2011 | (South Korea) Koo Ja-cheol | 5 | |
| 2015 | (United Arab Emirates) Ali Mabkhout | 5 | |
| 2019 | (Qatar) Almoez Ali | 9 | |
| 2023 | (Qatar) Akram Afif | 8 | |

== Best Goalkeeper ==
| Year | Best Goalkeeper |
|---|---|
| 1984 | (Saudi Arabia) Abdullah Al-Deayea |
| 1988 | (China) Zhang Huikang |
| 1992 | Not awarded |
| 1996 | (Saudi Arabia) Mohamed Al-Deayea |
| 2000 | (China) Jiang Jin |
| 2004 | Not awarded |
| 2007 | (Iraq) Noor Sabri |
| 2011 | Not awarded |
| 2015 | (Australia) Mathew Ryan |
| 2019 | (Qatar) Saad Al-Sheeb |
| 2023 | (Qatar) Meshaal Barsham |

== Team of the Tournament ==
=== By edition ===
| Year | Goalkeepers | Defenders | Midfielders | Forwards |
|---|---|---|---|---|
| 1980 | (Iran) Nasser Hejazi | (Kuwait) Naeem Saad (Malaysia) Soh Chin Aun (Kuwait) Mahboub Juma'a (Iran) Mehdi Dinvarzadeh | (Iran) Abdolreza Barzegari (Kuwait) Saad Al-Houti (South Korea) Lee Young-moo | (South Korea) Choi Soon-ho (Kuwait) Faisal Al-Dakhil (Kuwait) Jasem Yaqoub |
| 1984 | Unknown or not awarded | | | |
| 1988 (18 players) | (China) Zhang Huikang (Saudi Arabia) Abdullah Al-Deayea | (Saudi Arabia) Mohamed Al-Jawad (Saudi Arabia) Saleh Nu'eimeh (South Korea) Park Kyung-hoon (South Korea) Chung Yong-hwan | (China) Xie Yuxin (United Arab Emirates) Mohamed Salim (Kuwait) Mahboub Juma'a (Iran) Sirous Ghayeghran (South Korea) Chung Hae-won (Qatar) Adel Khamis (Kuwait) Abdulaziz Al-Hajeri (South Korea) Byun Byung-joo | (Saudi Arabia) Youssef Al-Thunayan (Saudi Arabia) Majed Abdullah (South Korea) Kim Joo-sung (China) Wang Baoshan |
| 1992 | Unknown or not awarded | | | |
| 1996 | (Saudi Arabia) Mohamed Al-Deayea | (Saudi Arabia) Abdullah Zubromawi (United Arab Emirates) Yousef Saleh (Iran) Mohammad Khakpour | (Iran) Mehrdad Minavand (United Arab Emirates) Mohamed Ali (Saudi Arabia) Khalid Al-Muwallid (United Arab Emirates) Saad Bakheet Mubarak | (Saudi Arabia) Fahad Al-Mehallel (Kuwait) Jasem Al-Huwaidi (Iran) Ali Daei |
| 2000 | (China) Jiang Jin | (South Korea) Hong Myung-bo (Saudi Arabia) Mohammed Al-Khilaiwi (Kuwait) Jamal Mubarak | (Japan) Hiroshi Nanami (Saudi Arabia) Nawaf Al-Temyat (Iraq) Abbas Obeid (Iran) Karim Bagheri (Japan) Shunsuke Nakamura | (South Korea) Lee Dong-gook (Japan) Naohiro Takahara |
| 2004 | (Japan) Yoshikatsu Kawaguchi | (Japan) Tsuneyasu Miyamoto (Japan) Yuji Nakazawa (China) Zheng Zhi (Iran) Mehdi Mahdavikia | (Japan) Shunsuke Nakamura (China) Shao Jiayi (China) Zhao Junzhe (Bahrain) Talal Yousef | (Bahrain) A'ala Hubail (Iran) Ali Karimi |
| 2007 | (South Korea) Lee Woon-jae | (Japan) Yuji Nakazawa (Australia) Lucas Neill (Iraq) Bassim Abbas (Iran) Rahman Rezaei | (Japan) Shunsuke Nakamura (Australia) Harry Kewell (South Korea) Lee Chun-soo (Iraq) Nashat Akram | (Japan) Naohiro Takahara (Saudi Arabia) Yasser Al-Qahtani |
| 2011 | Not awarded | | | |
| 2015 | (Australia) Mathew Ryan | (Iraq) Dhurgham Ismail (South Korea) Kwak Tae-hwi (Australia) Trent Sainsbury (South Korea) Cha Du-ri | (Australia) Massimo Luongo (United Arab Emirates) Omar Abdulrahman (South Korea) Ki Sung-yueng | (United Arab Emirates) Ali Mabkhout (Australia) Tim Cahill (South Korea) Son Heung-min |
| 2019 (23 players) | (Iran) Alireza Beiranvand (Japan) Shūichi Gonda (Qatar) Saad Al Sheeb | (United Arab Emirates) Bandar Al-Ahbabi (Qatar) Boualem Khoukhi (Japan) Maya Yoshida (Qatar) Bassam Al-Rawi (Japan) Yuto Nagatomo (Qatar) Abdelkarim Hassan (South Korea) Kim Min-jae | (Iran) Omid Ebrahimi (Qatar) Abdulaziz Hatem (Iran) Ashkan Dejagah (Australia) Tom Rogic (Japan) Gaku Shibasaki (Qatar) Hassan Al-Haydos | (Qatar) Akram Afif (Qatar) Almoez Ali (Iran) Sardar Azmoun (Vietnam) Nguyễn Quang Hải (China) Wu Lei (United Arab Emirates) Ali Mabkhout (Japan) Yuya Osako |
| 2023 (1) (Note: Selected by official social networking service.) | (Qatar) Meshaal Barsham | (Jordan) Abdallah Nasib (Saudi Arabia) Ali Al-Bulaihi (Qatar) Lucas Mendes | (Iran) Mehdi Ghayedi (Australia) Craig Goodwin (Qatar) Hassan Al-Haydos (South Korea) Lee Kang-in | (Qatar) Akram Afif (Iraq) Aymen Hussein (Jordan) Yazan Al-Naimat |
| 2023 (2) (Note: Selected by Technical Study Group.) (26 players) | (Qatar) Meshaal Barsham (Jordan) Yazeed Abulaila (Australia) Mathew Ryan | (Jordan) Yazan Al-Arab (Australia) Aziz Behich (Jordan) Ihsan Haddad (Tajikistan) Vahdat Hanonov (South Korea) Kim Min-jae (Qatar) Lucas Mendes (Jordan) Abdallah Nasib | (Qatar) Hassan Al-Haydos (Japan) Wataru Endo (Iran) Saeid Ezatolahi (Australia) Jackson Irvine (Iran) Alireza Jahanbakhsh (Qatar) Ahmed Fatehi (Uzbekistan) Abbosbek Fayzullaev | (Qatar) Akram Afif (Qatar) Almoez Ali (Jordan) Yazan Al-Naimat (Iran) Sardar Azmoun (South Korea) Lee Kang-in (Uzbekistan) Jaloliddin Masharipov (South Korea) Son Heung-min (Jordan) Musa Al-Taamari (Iran) Mehdi Taremi |

=== All-time XI ===
On 12 August 2023, the AFC announced all-time Asian Cup XI selected by fans and experts.

| Goalkeeper | Defenders | Midfielders | Forwards |
|---|---|---|---|
| (Saudi Arabia) Mohamed Al-Deayea | (Iran) Mehdi Mahdavikia (South Korea) Hong Myung-bo (Japan) Yuji Nakazawa (Japan) Yuto Nagatomo | (South Korea) Park Ji-sung (Japan) Shunsuke Nakamura (Japan) Keisuke Honda | (Australia) Tim Cahill (Iran) Ali Daei (South Korea) Son Heung-min |

== Fair Play Award ==
First awarded in 1984

| Year | Winner | Ref. |
|---|---|---|
| 1984 | China | |
| 1988 | Not awarded | |
| 1992 | Not awarded | |
| 1996 | Iran | |
| 2000 | Saudi Arabia | |
| 2004 | China | |
| 2007 | Japan | |
| 2011 | South Korea | |
| 2015 | Australia | |
| 2019 | Japan | |
| 2023 | Qatar | |

== See also ==
- FIFA World Cup awards
- UEFA European Championship awards
- Copa América awards
- Africa Cup of Nations awards
- CONCACAF Gold Cup awards
- OFC Men's Nations Cup awards
