= 1988 AFC Asian Cup final =

Association football match

- Event: 1988 AFC Asian Cup
South Korea	Saudi Arabia
(South Korea)	(Saudi Arabia)
0	0
- After extra time Saudi Arabia won 4–3 on penalties
- Date: 18 December 1988
- Venue: Al-Ahli Stadium, Doha
- Referee: Michel Vautrot (France)
- Attendance: 20,000

The 1988 AFC Asian Cup final was a football match which determined the winner of the 1988 AFC Asian Cup, the 8th edition of the AFC Asian Cup, a quadrennial tournament contested by the men's national teams of the member associations of the Asian Football Confederation.

== Venue ==
Al-Ahli Stadium also known as Hamad bin Khalifa Stadium located in Doha, Qatar, hosted the 1988 AFC Asian Cup Final. The 18,000-seat stadium is used by Al Ahli SC (Doha) and Al-Sailiya SC. It was one of two stadiums used to host the 1988 Asian Cup; twelve matches were played in the stadium including the final.

== Route to the final ==
South Korea
Round
Saudi Arabia
Opponents
Result
Group stage
Opponents
Result
United Arab Emirates
1–0
Match 1
Syria
2–0
Japan
2–0
Match 2
Kuwait
0–0
Qatar
3–2
Match 3
Bahrain
1–1
Iran
3–0
Match 4
China
1–0
Group A Winners

Pos	Team	Pld	Pts
1	South Korea	4	8
2	Iran	4	5
3	Qatar	4	4
4	United Arab Emirates	4	2
5	Japan	4	1

Final standings
Group B winners

Pos	Team	Pld	Pts
1	Saudi Arabia	4	6
2	China	4	5
3	Syria	4	4
4	Kuwait	4	3
5	Bahrain	4	2

Opponents
Result
Knockout stage
Opponents
Result
China
2–1 (a.e.t.)
Semi-finals
Iran
1–0

== Match ==
=== Final ===
18 December 1988
16:00

South Korea	0–0 (a.e.t.)	Saudi Arabia
	Report
Penalties
Cho Min-kook (penalty missed); Lee Tae-ho (penalty scored); Byun Byung-joo (penalty scored); Kim Joo-sung (penalty scored); Cho Yoon-hwan (penalty missed)	3–4	(penalty scored) Nu'eimeh; (penalty missed) Abd Al-Jawad; (penalty scored) Abdullah; (penalty scored) Al-Mutlaq; (penalty scored) Al-Bishi

Al-Ahly Stadium, Doha
Attendance: 20,000
Referee: Michel Vautrot (France)

GK	1	Cho Byung-deuk
RB	2	Park Kyung-hoon
CB	5	Chung Yong-hwan
CB	13	Cho Yoon-hwan
LB	17	Gu Sang-bum	(yellow card) 71'
RM	19	Yeo Bum-kyu	(yellow card) 109'
CM	4	Cho Min-kook
CM	8	Chung Hae-won
LM	10	Ham Hyun-gi		(substituted off) 49'
CF	14	Hwang Sun-hong		(substituted off) 59'
CF	16	Kim Joo-sung	(yellow card) 50'
Substitutes:
FW	11	Byun Byung-joo		(substituted on) 49'
FW	6	Lee Tae-ho		(substituted on) 59'
Manager:
(South Korea) Lee Hoe-taik

GK	1	Abdullah Al-Deayea
RB	2	Abdullah Al-Dosari
CB	4	Ahmed Jameel Madani
CB	5	Saleh Nu'eimeh
LB	13	Mohamed Abd Al-Jawad	(yellow card) 34'
RM	6	Saleh Al-Mutlaq
CM	8	Fahad Al-Bishi
CM	10	Fahad Al-Musaibeah
LM	9	Majed Abdullah
CF	15	Yousuf Al-Thunayan		(substituted off) 106'
CF	17	Saad Al-Dossary		(substituted off) 72'
Substitutes:
FW	11	Mohaisen Al-Jam'an		(substituted on) 72'
FW	7	Yousuf Jazea'a Al-Dosari		(substituted on) 106'
Manager:
(Brazil) Carlos Alberto Parreira
