= Saudi Arabia national football team results (1980–1999) =

This is a list of the Saudi Arabia national football team results from 1980 to 1999.

== Results ==
=== 1980 ===
30 January 1980 Friendly	Saudi Arabia	1–3	South Korea	Riyadh, Saudi Arabia
	Abdullah 7'	Report	? 10' ? 40' ? 88'	Stadium: Prince Faisal bin Fahd Stadium; Attendance: 20,000

1 February 1980 Friendly	Saudi Arabia	0–0	South Korea	Khobar, Saudi Arabia
		Report		Stadium: Prince Saud bin Jalawi Stadium; Referee: Fahad Al Dahmash (Saudi Arabia)

29 September 1980 Islamic Games	Saudi Arabia	3–0	Malaysia	İzmir, Turkey
	Majed Abdullah 30'; Amin Dabo 35'; Darwish Saeed 72'	Report		Stadium: Atatürk Stadium; Attendance: 1,000

3 October 1980 Islamic Games	Turkey	3–0	Saudi Arabia	İzmir, Turkey
	Tuncay Soyak 2'; Saleh Al-Nu'eimeh 34' (o.g.); Zafer Bilgetay 80'	Report		Stadium: Atatürk Stadium; Attendance: 5,591; Referee: Zayn Al Abidin Alaadin (Malaysia)

4 October 1980 Islamic Games	Libya	2–0	Saudi Arabia	İzmir, Turkey
	Abdulnaser Ezzeddin 69'; Salem Mohammed Mismari 70'	Report		Stadium: Atatürk Stadium; Referee: Erkan Göksel (Turkey)

12 December 1980 Friendly	Saudi Arabia	8–0	Indonesia	Riyadh, Saudi Arabia
		Report		Stadium: Prince Faisal bin Fahd Stadium

14 December 1980 Friendly	Saudi Arabia	3–0	Indonesia	Jeddah, Saudi Arabia
		Report		Stadium: Prince Abdullah Al Faisal Stadium

=== 1981 ===
24 February 1981 Friendly	Singapore	1–1	Saudi Arabia	Kallang, Singapore
15:25 UTC+8	22'	Report	Al-Dosari 70'	Stadium: Former National Stadium

8 March 1981 Friendly	Saudi Arabia	1–2	Tunisia	Riyadh, Saudi Arabia
15:25 UTC+3	Jassim 21'	Report	Altunissi 74'; Dhiab 90'	Stadium: Prince Faisal bin Fahd Stadium; Referee: Fallaj Al Shanar (Saudi Arabia)

11 March 1981 Friendly	Saudi Arabia	2–1	Jordan	Riyadh, Saudi Arabia
16:00 UTC+3	Khames 20'; Dabo 27'	Report	74'	Stadium: Prince Faisal bin Fahd Stadium

21 March 1981 1982 FWCQ	Iraq	0–1	Saudi Arabia	Riyadh, Saudi Arabia
20:00 UTC+3		Report	Mohammad 82'	Stadium: Prince Faisal bin Fahd Stadium; Referee: Mario Rubio Vázquez (Mexico)

24 March 1981 1982 FWCQ	Syria	0–2	Saudi Arabia	Riyadh, Saudi Arabia
20:00 UTC+3		Report	Jassem 47', 65'	Stadium: Prince Faisal bin Fahd Stadium; Referee: Junichi Nichi (Japan)

28 March 1981 1982 FWCQ	Saudi Arabia	1–0	Bahrain	Riyadh, Saudi Arabia
20:00 UTC+3	Al-Dosari 71'	Report		Stadium: Prince Faisal bin Fahd Stadium; Referee: Toshikazu Sano (Japan)

31 March 1981 1982 FWCQ	Saudi Arabia	1–0	Qatar	Riyadh, Saudi Arabia
20:00 UTC+3	Aboloya 85'	Report		Stadium: Prince Faisal bin Fahd Stadium; Referee: Tony Boskovic (Australia)

17 October 1981 Friendly	Saudi Arabia	2–0	South Korea	Riyadh, Saudi Arabia
15:25 UTC+3	Al-Musaibeah 18'; Abdullah 87'	Report		Stadium: Prince Faisal bin Fahd Stadium; Referee: Fallaj Al Shanar (Saudi Arabia)

28 October 1981 Friendly	Saudi Arabia	1–2	Sweden	Riyadh, Saudi Arabia
15:30 UTC+3	Al-Musaibeah 38'	Report	Larsson 23', 83'	Stadium: Prince Faisal bin Fahd Stadium; Referee: Fahad Al Dahmash (Saudi Arabia)

4 November 1981 1982 FWCQ	Saudi Arabia	0–1	Kuwait	Riyadh, Saudi Arabia
20:00 UTC+3		Report	Al-Anbari 55'	Stadium: Prince Faisal bin Fahd Stadium; Attendance: 28,000; Referee: Alf Grey (England)

12 November 1981 1982 FWCQ	Saudi Arabia	2–4	China	Kuala Lumpur, Malaysia (Note: The match was held in Malaysia due to China and Saudi Arabia not having diplomatic relations.)
20:00 UTC+8	Al Nifawi 10'; Majed Abdullah 11'	Report	Zuo Shusheng 62'; Chen Jingang 63'; Gu Guangming 76'; Huang Xiangdong 88'	Stadium: Merdeka Stadium; Attendance: 40,000; Referee: Alexis Ponnet (Belgium)

19 November 1981 1982 FWCQ	China	2–0	Saudi Arabia	Kuala Lumpur, Malaysia
20:00 UTC+8	Huang Xiangdong 24'; Cai Jinbiao 27'	Report		Stadium: Merdeka Stadium; Attendance: 45,000; Referee: José Roberto Wright (Brazil)

28 November 1981 1982 FWCQ	New Zealand	2–2	Saudi Arabia	Auckland, New Zealand
20:00 UTC+12	Billy McClure 15' (pen.); Ricki Herbert 87'	Report	Majed Abdullah 37', 41'	Stadium: Mt. Smart Stadium; Referee: Arturo Ithurralde (Argentina)

7 December 1981 1982 FWCQ	Kuwait	2–0	Saudi Arabia	Kuwait City, Kuwait
20:00 UTC+3	Al-Dakhil 36', 56'	Report		Stadium: Al-Qadisiyyah Stadium; Attendance: 25,000; Referee: Jan Redelfs (West Germany)

19 December 1981 1982 FWCQ	Saudi Arabia	0–5	New Zealand	Riyadh, Saudi Arabia
20:00 UTC+3		Report	Wynton Rufer 16', 39'; Brian Turner 17', 43' (pen.); Steve Wooddin 38'	Stadium: Prince Faisal bin Fahd Stadium; Attendance: 5,000; Referee: Charles Corver (Netherlands)

=== 1982 ===
21 March 1982 1982 Gulf Cup	United Arab Emirates	1–0	Saudi Arabia	Abu Dhabi, United Arab Emirates
20:00 UTC+4	Khalifah 49'	Report		Stadium: Zayed Sports City Stadium; Referee: Gianfranco Menegali (Italy)

24 March 1982 1982 Gulf Cup	Iraq	1–1 (Note: The match was declared null and void after Iraq withdrew from the competition.)	Saudi Arabia	Abu Dhabi, United Arab Emirates
18:00 UTC+4	Saeed 88'	Report	Al Saqeer 14'	Stadium: Zayed Sports City Stadium; Referee: Brian McGinlay (Scotland)

26 March 1982 1982 Gulf Cup	Kuwait	1–0	Saudi Arabia	Abu Dhabi, United Arab Emirates
20:00 UTC+4	Al-Haddad 88'	Report		Stadium: Zayed Sports City Stadium; Referee: Jan Redelfs (West Germany)

29 March 1982 1982 Gulf Cup	Saudi Arabia	1–0	Qatar	Abu Dhabi, United Arab Emirates
16:00 UTC+4	Abdullah 68' (pen.)	Report		Stadium: Zayed Sports City Stadium; Attendance: 15,000; Referee: Jan Redelfs (West Germany)

31 March 1982 1982 Gulf Cup	Saudi Arabia	3–0	Oman	Abu Dhabi, United Arab Emirates
20:00 UTC+4		Report		Stadium: Zayed Sports City Stadium

2 April 1982 1982 Gulf Cup	Saudi Arabia	2–2	Bahrain	Abu Dhabi, United Arab Emirates
20:00 UTC+4		Report		Stadium: Zayed Sports City Stadium; Referee: Abdullah Ghareeb (Kuwait)

3 October 1982 Friendly	Saudi Arabia	2–1	Morocco	Riyadh, Saudi Arabia
12:00 UTC+3	Al-Dosari 21'; Al Qahtani 70'	Report	Bouderbala 41'	Stadium: Prince Faisal bin Fahd Stadium; Referee: Abdullah Al Naseer (Saudi Arabia)

12 October 1982 Friendly	Saudi Arabia	0–0	Cameroon	Riyadh, Saudi Arabia
20:00 UTC+3		Report		Stadium: Prince Faisal bin Fahd Stadium; Referee: Fallaj Al Shanar (Saudi Arabia)

20 November 1982 1982 Asian Games	Saudi Arabia	1–0	Thailand	New Delhi, India
20:30 UTC+5:30	Al Qahtani 45'	Report		Stadium: Ambedkar Stadium

22 November 1982 1982 Asian Games	Saudi Arabia	1–1	Syria	New Delhi, India
16:00 UTC+5:30	Al Qahtani 54'	Report	Madarati 16'	Stadium: Chhatrasal Stadium

24 November 1982 1982 Asian Games	North Korea	2–2	Saudi Arabia	New Delhi, India
16:00 UTC+5:30	Kim Jong-Man 30'; Hwang Sang-Hoi 40'	Report	Ba Yazeed 11'; Abdul Shakor 20'	Stadium: Chhatrasal Stadium

27 November 1982 1982 Asian Games	India	0–1	Saudi Arabia	New Delhi, India
20:00 UTC+5:30		Report		Stadium: Jawaharlal Nehru Stadium; Referee: Vijit Getkeaw (Thailand)

1 December 1982 1982 Asian Games	Iraq	1–0	Saudi Arabia	New Delhi, India
20:00 UTC+5:30		Report		Stadium: Jawaharlal Nehru Stadium; Referee: Hardjowasito Sudarso (Indonesia)

2 December 1982 1982 Asian Games	North Korea	0–2; Awarded (Note: The match was scratched and Saudi Arabia were awarded the bronze medal 2–0 after the North Korean team (including officials and competitors from other sports) were handed a two-year suspension for assaulting the referee, Vijit Getkaew of Thailand, and his linesman after the final whistle of their semi-final.)	Saudi Arabia	New Delhi, India
				Stadium: Jawaharlal Nehru Stadium

=== 1984 ===
21 February 1984 Friendly	Saudi Arabia	4–2	Algeria	Riyadh, Saudi Arabia
	Abdullah 3' (pen.), 73'; Khalifa 13'; Al-Nafisah 90'	Report	Zidane 30', 58'	Stadium: Prince Faisal bin Fahd Stadium; Referee: Fallaj Al-Shanar (Saudi Arabia)

10 March 1984 1984 Gulf Cup	Qatar	2–1	Saudi Arabia	Muscat, Oman
		Report		Stadium: Royal Oman Police Stadium

15 March 1984 1984 Gulf Cup	Saudi Arabia	3–1	Oman	Muscat, Oman
		Report		Stadium: Royal Oman Police Stadium

17 March 1984 1984 Gulf Cup	Iraq	4–0	Saudi Arabia	Muscat, Oman
		Report		Stadium: Royal Oman Police Stadium

20 March 1984 1984 Gulf Cup	Saudi Arabia	1–1	Kuwait	Muscat, Oman
		Report		Stadium: Royal Oman Police Stadium

23 March 1984 1984 Gulf Cup	Saudi Arabia	2–0	United Arab Emirates	Muscat, Oman
		Report		Stadium: Royal Oman Police Stadium

26 March 1984 1984 Gulf Cup	Saudi Arabia	2–0	Bahrain	Muscat, Oman
		Report		Stadium: Royal Oman Police Stadium

25 September 1984 Friendly	Saudi Arabia	1–2	Iceland	Khobar, Saudi Arabia
		Report		Stadium: Prince Saud bin Jalawi Stadium; Attendance: 15,000; Referee: Fallaj Al Shanar (Saudi Arabia)

8 October 1984 Friendly	Saudi Arabia	2–1	Thailand	Jeddah, Saudi Arabia
		Report		Stadium: Prince Abdullah Al Faisal Stadium

10 October 1984 Friendly	Saudi Arabia	1–3	Thailand	Jeddah, Saudi Arabia
		Report		Stadium: Prince Abdullah Al Faisal Stadium

19 October 1984 1984 Asian Cup qualification	Saudi Arabia	7–0	Nepal	Jeddah, Saudi Arabia
		Report		Stadium: Prince Abdullah Al Faisal Stadium

22 October 1984 1984 Asian Cup qualification	Saudi Arabia	1–0	United Arab Emirates	Jeddah, Saudi Arabia
		Report		Stadium: Prince Abdullah Al Faisal Stadium

24 October 1984 1984 Asian Cup qualification	Saudi Arabia	5–0	Sri Lanka	Jeddah, Saudi Arabia
		Report		Stadium: Prince Abdullah Al Faisal Stadium

26 October 1984 1984 Asian Cup qualification	Saudi Arabia	6–0	Oman	Jeddah, Saudi Arabia
		Report		Stadium: Prince Abdullah Al Faisal Stadium

20 November 1984 Friendly	Saudi Arabia	2–1	Finland	Jubail, Saudi Arabia
		Report		Stadium: Jubail Club Stadium; Attendance: 6,000

2 December 1984 1984 Asian Cup	Saudi Arabia	1–1	South Korea	Singapore
19:00 UTC+8	Abdullah 90'	Report	Lee Tae-Ho 51'	Stadium: National Stadium; Attendance: 20,000; Referee: George Joseph (Malaysia)

4 December 1984 1984 Asian Cup	Syria	0–1	Saudi Arabia	Singapore
21:00 UTC+8		Report	Khalifa 66'	Stadium: National Stadium; Attendance: 2,000; Referee: Shizuo Takada (Japan)

8 December 1984 1984 Asian Cup	Qatar	1–1	Saudi Arabia	Singapore
19:00 UTC+8	Zaid 47'	Report	Abduljawad 65'	Stadium: National Stadium; Attendance: 15,000; Referee: Antonio Márquez (Mexico)

11 December 1984 1984 Asian Cup	Kuwait	0–1	Saudi Arabia	Singapore
21:00 UTC+8		Report	Al-Jam'an 88'	Stadium: National Stadium; Attendance: 5,000; Referee: Toshikazu Sano (Japan)

13 December 1984 1984 Asian Cup	Saudi Arabia	1–1 (a.e.t.) (5–4 p)	Iran	Singapore
20:00 UTC+8	Shahin Bayani 88' (o.g.)	Report	Shahrokh Bayani 43'	Stadium: National Stadium; Attendance: 20,000; Referee: George Courtney (England)
	Penalties
	Abdullah (penalty scored); Abduljawad (penalty scored); Nu'eimeh (penalty scored); Al-Jam'an (penalty scored); Al-Musaibeah (penalty scored)		(penalty scored) Hajiloo; (penalty scored) Mokhtarifar; (penalty scored) Derakhshan; (penalty missed) Panjali; (penalty scored) Shahrokh Bayani

16 December 1984 1984 Asian Cup	Saudi Arabia	2–0	China	Singapore
20:00 UTC+8	Al-Nafisah 10'; Abdullah 46'	Report		Stadium: National Stadium; Attendance: 26,000; Referee: Shizuo Takada (Japan)

=== 1985 ===
12 April 1985 1986 FWCQ	Saudi Arabia	0–0	United Arab Emirates	Riyadh, Saudi Arabia
		Report		Stadium: King Fahd Stadium; Attendance: 30,973; Referee: Mohammad Sakran (Jordan)

19 April 1985 1986 FWCQ	United Arab Emirates	1–0	Saudi Arabia	Dubai, United Arab Emirates
	F. Khamees 5'	Report		Stadium: Zabeel Stadium; Attendance: 15,000; Referee: Bob Valentine (Scotland)

3 July 1985 1985 Arab Cup	Saudi Arabia	4–0	Jordan	Ta'if, Saudi Arabia
	Nu'eimeh 45'; Azmi 49' (o.g.); Al-Musaibeah 58'; Al-Bishi 89'	Report		Stadium: King Fahd Stadium; Referee: Nizar Watti (Syria)

7 July 1985 1985 Arab Cup	Saudi Arabia	1–0	Qatar	Ta'if, Saudi Arabia
	Mohammad 61'	Report		Stadium: King Fahd Stadium; Referee: Belaïd Lacarne (Algeria)

10 July 1985 1985 Arab Cup	Iraq	3–2	Saudi Arabia	Ta'if, Saudi Arabia
	Abid 12', 18'; Rasheed 28'	Report	Nu'eimeh 12' (pen.); Abd Al-Jawad 88'	Stadium: King Fahd Stadium; Referee: Belaïd Lacarne (Algeria)

12 July 1985 1985 Arab Cup	Saudi Arabia	0–0 (a.e.t.) (3–1 p)	Qatar	Ta'if, Saudi Arabia
		Report		Stadium: King Fahd Stadium

28 July 1985 Friendly	Tunisia	1–0	Saudi Arabia

15 September 1985 1985 Afro-Asian Cup of Nations	Cameroon	4–1	Saudi Arabia	Yaoundé, Cameroon
17:00 UTC+1	Omam-Biyik 8'; Milla 33' 84'; Kundé 87' (pen.)		Abu Dawud 44'	Stadium: Stade Ahmadou Ahidjo; Attendance: 80,000; Referee: Tesfaye Gebreyesus (Ethiopia)

4 October 1985 1985 Afro-Asian Cup of Nations	Saudi Arabia	2–1	Cameroon	Ta'if, Saudi Arabia
16:00 UTC+3	Mohammed 9'; Abd Al-Jawad 86'	Report	Omam-Biyik 57'	Stadium: King Fahd Stadium; Attendance: 20,000; Referee: Jassim Mandi (Bahrain)

=== 1986 ===
17 February 1986 Friendly	Saudi Arabia	0–0	Algeria	Khobar, Saudi Arabia
19:30 UTC+3		Report		Stadium: Prince Saud bin Jalawi Stadium

21 February 1986 Friendly	Saudi Arabia	1–1	Algeria	Khobar, Saudi Arabia
19:30 UTC+3	Mohammed 17'	Report	Bouiche 81'	Stadium: Prince Saud bin Jalawi Stadium

25 February 1986 Friendly	Saudi Arabia	1–2	Wales	Khobar, Saudi Arabia
19:30 UTC+3		Report		Stadium: Prince Saud bin Jalawi Stadium

28 February 1986 Friendly	Saudi Arabia	0–1	Finland	Khobar, Saudi Arabia
19:30 UTC+3		Report		Stadium: Prince Saud bin Jalawi Stadium

9 March 1986 Friendly	Saudi Arabia	0–0	Paraguay	Khobar, Saudi Arabia
19:30 UTC+3		Report		Stadium: Prince Saud bin Jalawi Stadium

23 March 1986 1986 Gulf Cup	Kuwait	3–1	Saudi Arabia	Riffa, Bahrain
20:00 UTC+3		Report		Stadium: Bahrain National Stadium; Referee: Bob Valentine (Scotland)

25 March 1986 1986 Gulf Cup	Bahrain	2–1	Saudi Arabia	Riffa, Bahrain
20:00 UTC+3		Report		Stadium: Bahrain National Stadium; Referee: Michel Vautrot (France)

28 March 1986 1986 Gulf Cup	Saudi Arabia	3–1	Oman	Riffa, Bahrain
20:00 UTC+3		Report		Stadium: Bahrain National Stadium; Referee: Karl-Heinz Tritschler (West Germany)

30 March 1986 1986 Gulf Cup	Saudi Arabia	2–1	Iraq	Riffa, Bahrain
20:00 UTC+3		Report		Stadium: Bahrain National Stadium; Referee: Marcel Van Langenhove (Belgium)

2 April 1986 1986 Gulf Cup	United Arab Emirates	2–0	Saudi Arabia	Riffa, Bahrain
20:00 UTC+3		Report		Stadium: Bahrain National Stadium; Referee: Karl-Heinz Tritschler (West Germany)

5 April 1986 1986 Gulf Cup	Saudi Arabia	2–0	Qatar	Riffa, Bahrain
20:00 UTC+3		Report		Stadium: Bahrain National Stadium; Referee: Marcel Van Langenhove (Belgium)

7 September 1986 Friendly	Singapore	0–4	Saudi Arabia	Singapore
16:00 UTC+8		Report		Stadium: National Stadium

21 September 1986 1986 Asian Games	Saudi Arabia	3–1	Malaysia	Gwangju, South Korea
18:00 UTC+9	Al-Shehrani 28'; Abdullah 30', 53'	Report	Wong Hung Nung 12'	Stadium: Gwangju Mudeung Stadium

25 September 1986 1986 Asian Games	Indonesia	0–2	Saudi Arabia	Gwangju, South Korea
18:00 UTC+9		Report	Abdullah 84', 87'	Stadium: Gwangju Mudeung Stadium

29 September 1986 1986 Asian Games	Qatar	0–1	Saudi Arabia	Gwangju, South Korea
18:00 UTC+9		Report	Al-Jam'an 21'	Stadium: Gwangju Mudeung Stadium

1 October 1986 1986 Asian Games	Iraq	1–1 (a.e.t.) (9–10 p)	Saudi Arabia	Seoul, South Korea
20:00 UTC+9	Mohammed 51'	Report	Al-Shehrani 39'	Stadium: Olympic Stadium

3 October 1986 1986 Asian Games	Saudi Arabia	2–2 (a.e.t.) (7–6 p)	Kuwait	Seoul, South Korea
20:00 UTC+9	Al-Shehrani 53'; Al-Thunayan 79'	Report	Al-Suwayed 18'; Al-Hasawi 66'	Stadium: Olympic Stadium

5 October 1986 1986 Asian Games	South Korea	2–0	Saudi Arabia	Seoul, South Korea
20:00 UTC+9	Cho Kwang-rae 7'; Byun Byung-joo 84'	Report		Stadium: Olympic Stadium; Attendance: 70,000

=== 1988 ===
17 February 1988 Friendly	Saudi Arabia	2–2	Scotland	Riyadh, Saudi Arabia
16:00 UTC+3	Al-Dosari 16'; Abdullah 71'	Report	Johnston 47'; Collins 49'	Stadium: Prince Faisal bin Fahd Stadium; Referee: Abdullah Al Naseer (Saudi Arabia)

2 March 1988 1988 Gulf Cup	Saudi Arabia	2–0	Oman	Riyadh, Saudi Arabia
20:00 UTC+3	Al-Bishi 58'; Al-Dosari 84'	Report		Stadium: King Fahd International Stadium; Referee: Jassim Mandi (Bahrain)

5 March 1988 1988 Gulf Cup	Saudi Arabia	0–0	Qatar	Riyadh, Saudi Arabia
20:00 UTC+3		Report		Stadium: King Fahd International Stadium; Referee: Claude Bouillet (France)

9 March 1988 1988 Gulf Cup	Saudi Arabia	1–0	Bahrain	Riyadh, Saudi Arabia
20:00 UTC+3	Abdullah 88'	Report		Stadium: King Fahd International Stadium; Referee: Rune Larsson (Sweden)

13 March 1988 1988 Gulf Cup	Saudi Arabia	2–2	United Arab Emirates	Riyadh, Saudi Arabia
20:00 UTC+3	Gurab 61'; Abdullah 86'	Report	Bakheet 39', 41'	Stadium: King Fahd International Stadium; Referee: Carlo Longhi (Italy)

16 March 1988 1988 Gulf Cup	Iraq	2–0	Saudi Arabia	Riyadh, Saudi Arabia
20:00 UTC+3	Radhi 58'; Gorgis 72'	Report		Stadium: King Fahd International Stadium; Referee: Carlo Longhi (Italy)

18 March 1988 1988 Gulf Cup	Kuwait	0–0	Saudi Arabia	Riyadh, Saudi Arabia
20:00 UTC+3		Report		Stadium: King Fahd International Stadium; Referee: Jassim Mandi (Bahrain)

21 June 1988 Friendly	New Zealand	2–0	Saudi Arabia	Melbourne, Australia
13:00 UTC+11		Report		Stadium: Olympic Park Stadium

23 June 1988 Friendly	New Zealand	3–2	Saudi Arabia	Melbourne, Australia
13:00 UTC+11		Report		Stadium: Olympic Park Stadium

29 June 1988 Friendly	Hong Kong	0–3	Saudi Arabia
		Report

1 July 1988 Friendly	Hong Kong	0–1	Saudi Arabia
		Report

14 November 1988 Friendly	Saudi Arabia	0–0	Egypt
		Report

16 November 1988 Friendly	Saudi Arabia	1–1	England
		Report

23 November 1988 Friendly	Saudi Arabia	1–0	Tunisia
		Report

2 December 1988 1988 Asian Cup	Syria	0–2	Saudi Arabia	Doha, Qatar
18:00 UTC+3		Report	Al-Mutlaq 20'; Al-Suwaiyed 82'	Stadium: Qatar SC Stadium; Referee: Erik Fredriksson (Sweden)

5 December 1988 1988 Asian Cup	Saudi Arabia	0–0	Kuwait	Doha, Qatar
15:00 UTC+3		Report		Stadium: Al-Ahly Stadium; Referee: Michel Vautrot (France)

9 December 1988 1988 Asian Cup	Saudi Arabia	1–1	Bahrain	Doha, Qatar
15:00 UTC+3	Jazea'a 78'	Report	F. Mohamed 44' (pen.)	Stadium: Qatar SC Stadium; Referee: Vincent Mauro (United States)

12 December 1988 1988 Asian Cup	China	0–1	Saudi Arabia	Doha, Qatar
15:00 UTC+3		Report	Al-Bishi 56'	Stadium: Al-Ahly Stadium; Referee: Mohamed Hansal (Algeria)

15 December 1988 1988 Asian Cup	Saudi Arabia	1–0	Iran	Doha, Qatar
16:00 UTC+3	Abdullah 16'	Report		Stadium: Qatar SC Stadium; Attendance: 17,000; Referee: George Courtney (England)

18 December 1988 1988 Asian Cup	South Korea	0–0 (a.e.t.) (3–4 p)	Saudi Arabia	Doha, Qatar
16:00 UTC+3		Report		Stadium: Al-Ahly Stadium; Attendance: 20,000; Referee: Michel Vautrot (France)
	Penalties
	Cho Min-Kook (penalty missed); Lee Tae-Ho (penalty scored); Byun Byung-Joo (penalty scored); Kim Joo-Sung (penalty scored); Cho Yoon-Hwan (penalty missed)		(penalty scored) Nu'eimeh; (penalty missed) Abd Al-Jawad; (penalty scored) Abdullah; (penalty scored) Al-Mutlaq; (penalty scored) Al-Bishi

=== 1989 ===
15 March 1989 1990 FWCQ	Saudi Arabia	5–4	Syria

20 March 1989 1990 FWCQ	Yemen	0–1	Saudi Arabia

30 March 1989 1990 FWCQ	Syria	0–0	Saudi Arabia

5 April 1989 1990 FWCQ	Saudi Arabia	1–0	Yemen

12 October 1989 1990 FWCQ	China	2–1	Saudi Arabia

16 October 1989 1990 FWCQ	Qatar	1–1	Saudi Arabia

21 October 1989 1990 FWCQ	Saudi Arabia	0–0	United Arab Emirates

25 October 1989 1990 FWCQ	South Korea	2–0	Saudi Arabia

28 October 1989 1990 FWCQ	North Korea	2–0	Saudi Arabia

=== 1990 ===
24 September 1990 1990 Asian Games	Saudi Arabia	4–0	Bangladesh	Beijing, China
	Abdulshakoor 11'; Abdullah 12', 80' (pen.); Al-Bishi 73'			Stadium: Xiannongtan Stadium; Referee: Robert Lee (Singapore)

28 September 1990 1990 Asian Games	Saudi Arabia	2–0	Japan	Beijing, China
	Al-Bishi 30'; Al-Muwallid 48'			Stadium: Fengtai Stadium; Referee: Kim In-soo (South Korea)

1 October 1990 1990 Asian Games	Saudi Arabia	0–0 (a.e.t.) (3–4 p)	North Korea	Beijing, China
				Stadium: Xiannongtan Stadium; Referee: Kiichiro Tachi (Japan)

=== 1992 ===
11 September 1992 1992 Arab Cup	Syria	1–1	Saudi Arabia	Aleppo, Syria
	Kardaghli 78'		Abdullah 58' (pen.)	Stadium: Al-Hamadaniah Stadium

15 September 1992 1992 Arab Cup	Saudi Arabia	2–0	Kuwait	Aleppo, Syria
	Al-Muwallid 38'; Al-Jaber 87'			Stadium: Al-Hamadaniah Stadium

15 October 1992 1992 King Fahd Cup	United States	0–3	Saudi Arabia	Riyadh, Saudi Arabia
		Report	Al-Bishi 48' (pen.); Al-Thunayan 74'; Al-Muwallid 84'	Stadium: King Fahd International Stadium; Attendance: 70,000; Referee: Ulisses Tavares da Silva (Brazil)

20 October 1992 1992 King Fahd Cup	Argentina	3–1	Saudi Arabia	Riyadh, Saudi Arabia
	Rodríguez 18'; Caniggia 24'; Simeone 64'	Report	Al-Owairan 65'	Stadium: King Fahd International Stadium; Attendance: 75,000; Referee: Lim Kee Chong (Mauritius)

29 October 1992 1992 Asian Cup	Saudi Arabia	1–1	China	Hiroshima, Japan
	Al-Thunayan 17'	Report	Li Bing 41'	Stadium: Hiroshima Big Arch; Attendance: 15,000; Referee: Shinichiro Obata (Japan)

31 October 1992 1992 Asian Cup	Saudi Arabia	1–1	Qatar	Hiroshima, Japan
	Al-Muwallid 86'	Report	Mustafa 74'	Stadium: Hiroshima Stadium; Attendance: 4,000; Referee: Neji Jouini (Tunisia)

2 November 1992 1992 Asian Cup	Saudi Arabia	4–0	Thailand	Onomichi, Japan
	Al-Owairan 4'; Al-Bishi 19', 72'; Al-Thunayan 64'	Report		Stadium: Bingo Sports Park; Attendance: 4,000; Referee: Ali Bujsaim (United Arab Emirates)

6 November 1992 1992 Asian Cup	Saudi Arabia	2–0	United Arab Emirates	Hiroshima, Japan
	Al-Owairan 77'; Al-Bishi 80'	Report		Stadium: Hiroshima Stadium; Attendance: 12,000; Referee: Rasheed Al-Jassas (Kuwait)

8 November 1992 1992 Asian Cup	Japan	1–0	Saudi Arabia	Hiroshima, Japan
	Takagi 36'	Report		Stadium: Hiroshima Big Arch; Attendance: 60,000; Referee: Jamal Al Sharif (Syria)

28 November 1992 1992 Gulf Cup	Bahrain	2–1	Saudi Arabia	Doha, Qatar
		Report		Stadium: Khalifa International Stadium

1 December 1992 1992 Gulf Cup	Saudi Arabia	0–1	United Arab Emirates	Doha, Qatar
		Report		Stadium: Khalifa International Stadium

4 December 1992 1992 Gulf Cup	Saudi Arabia	2–0	Oman	Doha, Qatar
		Report		Stadium: Khalifa International Stadium

6 December 1992 1992 Gulf Cup	Saudi Arabia	2–1	Kuwait	Doha, Qatar
		Report		Stadium: Khalifa International Stadium

10 December 1992 1992 Gulf Cup	Qatar	0–1	Saudi Arabia	Doha, Qatar
		Report		Stadium: Khalifa International Stadium

=== 1993 ===
9 April 1993 Friendly	Saudi Arabia	0–2	United States	Riyadh, Saudi Arabia
		Report	Moore 79'; Michallik 82'	Stadium: King Fahd International Stadium

18 April 1993 Friendly	Saudi Arabia	3–1	New Zealand
		Report

22 April 1993 Friendly	Singapore	0–3	Saudi Arabia
		Report

24 April 1993 Friendly	Saudi Arabia	1–0	New Zealand
		Report

1 May 1993 1994 FWCQ	Macau	0–6	Saudi Arabia	Kuala Lumpur, Malaysia
		Report	Al-Jaber 12'; Al-Owairan 21', 24'; Al-Dosari 65'; Al-Mehallel 68'; Al-Muwallid 79' (pen.)	Stadium: Stadium Merdeka; Attendance: 33,181; Referee: Kim Kwang-Taik (South Korea)

3 May 1993 1994 FWCQ	Malaysia	1–1	Saudi Arabia	Kuala Lumpur, Malaysia
	Mokhtar 31'	Report	Al-Muwallid 88' (pen.)	Stadium: Stadium Merdeka; Attendance: 25,082; Referee: Tachi Kiichiro (Japan)

5 May 1993 1994 FWCQ	Kuwait	0–0	Saudi Arabia	Kuala Lumpur, Malaysia
		Report		Stadium: Stadium Merdeka; Attendance: 11,370; Referee: Ahmed Hakeem (United Arab Emirates)

14 May 1993 1994 FWCQ	Saudi Arabia	8–0	Macau	Riyadh, Saudi Arabia
	Hamzah Idris 8', 25', 85'; Al-Muwallid 22' (pen.); Al-Owairan 37', 56', 79'; Al-Muainea 40'	Report		Stadium: King Fahd International Stadium; Attendance: 15,081; Referee: Mohamed Al Malood (Bahrain)

16 May 1993 1994 FWCQ	Saudi Arabia	3–0	Malaysia	Riyadh, Saudi Arabia
	Abdullah 9', 64'; Madani 58'	Report		Stadium: King Fahd International Stadium; Attendance: 34,491; Referee: Yadollah Soleimani (Iran)

18 May 1993 1994 FWCQ	Saudi Arabia	2–0	Kuwait	Riyadh, Saudi Arabia
	Al-Owairan 23'; Abdullah 89'	Report		Stadium: King Fahd International Stadium; Attendance: 34,491; Referee: Shizuo Takada (Japan)

17 September 1993 Friendly	Saudi Arabia	4–0	Thailand
		Report

20 September 1993 Friendly	Saudi Arabia	3–0	Thailand
		Report

23 September 1993 Friendly	Saudi Arabia	1–2	Costa Rica
		Report

27 September 1993 Friendly	Saudi Arabia	3–2	Costa Rica
		Report

6 October 1993 Friendly	Saudi Arabia	4–2	Russia
		Report

15 October 1993 1994 FWCQ	Saudi Arabia	0–0	Japan	Doha, Qatar
		Report		Stadium: Khalifa International Stadium; Attendance: 20,000; Referee: Serge Muhmenthaler (Switzerland)

18 October 1993 1994 FWCQ	North Korea	1–2	Saudi Arabia	Doha, Qatar
	Ryu Song-Gun 68'	Report	Mehalel 56'; Al-Muwallid 73'	Stadium: Khalifa International Stadium; Attendance: 15,000; Referee: Ion Crăciunescu (Romania)

22 October 1993 1994 FWCQ	South Korea	1–1	Saudi Arabia	Doha, Qatar
	Shin Hong-Ki 63'	Report	Madani 90'	Stadium: Khalifa International Stadium; Attendance: 35,000; Referee: Jaap Uilenberg (Netherlands)

24 October 1993 1994 FWCQ	Iraq	1–1	Saudi Arabia	Doha, Qatar
	Radhi 1'	Report	Owairan 36'	Stadium: Khalifa International Stadium; Attendance: 20,000; Referee: Joël Quiniou (France)

28 October 1993 1994 FWCQ	Saudi Arabia	4–3	Iran	Doha, Qatar
	Al-Jaber 21'; Mehalel 27'; Al-Mousa 47'; Falatah 64'	Report	Fonounizadeh 43', 52'; Manafi 90'	Stadium: Khalifa International Stadium; Attendance: 40,000; Referee: Jaap Uilenberg (Netherlands)

=== 1994 ===
23 January 1994 Friendly	Saudi Arabia	1–0	China

26 January 1994 Friendly	Saudi Arabia	1–1	China

6 February 1994 Friendly	Saudi Arabia	1–1	Colombia

9 February 1994 Friendly	Saudi Arabia	0–1	Colombia

26 March 1994 Friendly	Saudi Arabia	0–2	Chile

29 March 1994 Friendly	Saudi Arabia	2–2	Chile

13 April 1994 Friendly	Saudi Arabia	0–1	Poland

20 April 1994 Friendly	Saudi Arabia	2–0	Iceland

27 April 1994 Friendly	Greece	5–1	Saudi Arabia

4 May 1994 Friendly	Saudi Arabia	0–1	Bolivia

25 May 1994 Friendly	United States	0–0	Saudi Arabia

4 June 1994 Friendly	Trinidad and Tobago	2–3	Saudi Arabia

20 June 1994 1994 World Cup	Netherlands	2–1	Saudi Arabia	Washington, United States
19:30 UTC−4	Jonk 50'; Taument 86'	Report	Amin 18'	Stadium: RFK Stadium; Attendance: 50,535; Referee: Manuel Díaz Vega (Spain)

25 June 1994 1994 World Cup	Saudi Arabia	2–1	Morocco	East Rutherford, United States
12:30 UTC−4	Al-Jaber 7' (pen.); Amin 45'	Report	Chaouch 26'	Stadium: Giants Stadium; Attendance: 76,322; Referee: Philip Don (England)

29 June 1994 1994 World Cup	Belgium	0–1	Saudi Arabia	Washington, United States
12:30 UTC−4		Report	Al-Owairan 5'	Stadium: RFK Stadium; Attendance: 52,959; Referee: Hellmut Krug (Germany)

3 July 1994 1994 World Cup	Saudi Arabia	1–3	Sweden	Dallas, United States
12:00 UTC−5	Al-Ghesheyan 85'	Report	Dahlin 6'; K. Andersson 51', 88'	Stadium: Cotton Bowl; Attendance: 60,277; Referee: Renato Marsiglia (Brazil)

19 October 1994 Friendly	Saudi Arabia	2–1	United States

4 November 1994 1994 Gulf Cup	Saudi Arabia	2–1	Oman	Abu Dhabi, United Arab Emirates
				Stadium: Zayed Sports City Stadium; Attendance: 5,000; Referee: Robert Sedlacek (Austria)

6 November 1994 1994 Gulf Cup	Saudi Arabia	1–1	United Arab Emirates	Abu Dhabi, United Arab Emirates
				Stadium: Zayed Sports City Stadium; Attendance: 60,000

10 November 1994 1994 Gulf Cup	Saudi Arabia	3–1	Bahrain	Abu Dhabi, United Arab Emirates
				Stadium: Zayed Sports City Stadium; Referee: Robert Sedlacek (Austria)

12 November 1994 1994 Gulf Cup	Saudi Arabia	2–1	Qatar	Abu Dhabi, United Arab Emirates
				Stadium: Zayed Sports City Stadium; Attendance: 8,000; Referee: Tapio Yli-Karro (Finland)

16 November 1994 1994 Gulf Cup	Saudi Arabia	2–0	Kuwait	Abu Dhabi, United Arab Emirates
				Stadium: Zayed Sports City Stadium; Referee: Carlos Alberto Silva (Portugal)

10 December 1994 Friendly	Saudi Arabia	1–2	Poland

17 December 1994 Friendly	Saudi Arabia	1–3	Costa Rica

29 December 1994 Friendly	Saudi Arabia	1–0	Zambia

=== 1995 ===
6 January 1995 1995 King Fahd Cup	Saudi Arabia	0–2	Mexico	Riyadh, Saudi Arabia
18:15 UTC+3		Report	L. García 65', 82'	Stadium: King Fahd International Stadium; Attendance: 25,000; Referee: Salvador Imperatore (Chile)

8 January 1995 1995 King Fahd Cup	Saudi Arabia	0–2	Denmark	Riyadh, Saudi Arabia
18:15 UTC+3		Report	B. Laudrup 43'; Wieghorst 90'	Stadium: King Fahd International Stadium; Attendance: 10,000; Referee: Lim Kee Chong (Mauritius)

8 October 1995 Friendly	United States	4–3	Saudi Arabia	Washington D.C., United States
16:00 UTC−4	Lalas 35'; Max Moore 48'; Ramos 62'; Lassiter 68'	Report	Al-Jaber 9'; Al-Mehallel 11'; Al-Owairan 29' (pen.)	Stadium: Robert F. Kennedy Memorial Stadium; Attendance: 10,216; Referee: Raúl Domínguez (United States)

11 October 1995 Friendly	Mexico	2–1	Saudi Arabia	Los Angeles, United States
20:00 UTC−8	Suárez 78'; Lozano 87'	Report	Vidrio 23' (o.g.)	Stadium: Los Angeles Memorial Coliseum; Attendance: 40,389; Referee: Joshua Patlak (United States)

24 October 1995 Friendly	Japan	2–1	Saudi Arabia	Tokyo, Japan
20:00 UTC+9	Nanami 27'; Miura 54'	Report	Al-Turki 89'	Stadium: National Stadium; Attendance: 37,576; Referee: Zoran Petrović (Yugoslavia)

28 October 1995 Friendly	Japan	2–1	Saudi Arabia	Matsuyama, Japan
16:00 UTC+9	Miura 82'; Akita 85'	Report	Al-Jaber 53'	Stadium: Ningineer Stadium; Attendance: 25,000; Referee: Armando Pérez (Colombia)

31 October 1995 Friendly	South Korea	1–1	Saudi Arabia	Seoul, South Korea
20:00 UTC+9	Hwang Sun-hong 64'	Report	Amin 85'	Stadium: Seoul Olympic Stadium; Attendance: 50,000; Referee: Mohd Nazri Abdullah (Malaysia)

29 December 1995 Friendly	Saudi Arabia	3–0	Kazakhstan	Jeddah, Saudi Arabia
20:00 UTC+3	Al-Thunayan 57', 73'; Amin 64'	Report		Stadium: Prince Abdullah Al Faisal Stadium; Attendance: 8,500; Referee: Hasan Al-Beheiry (Saudi Arabia)

=== 1996 ===
5 January 1996 Friendly	Saudi Arabia	1–1	Ghana
		Report

24 January 1996 1996 Asian Cup qualification	Saudi Arabia	3–0	Kyrgyzstan
		Report

28 January 1996 1996 Asian Cup qualification	Saudi Arabia	4–0	Yemen
		Report

31 January 1996 1996 Asian Cup qualification	Kyrgyzstan	0–2	Saudi Arabia
		Report

4 February 1996 1996 Asian Cup qualification	Yemen	0–1	Saudi Arabia
		Report

19 September 1996 Friendly	Saudi Arabia	2–1	Zambia
		Report

25 September 1996 Friendly	Saudi Arabia	1–3	Zambia
		Report

3 October 1996 Friendly	Saudi Arabia	3–0	New Zealand
		Report

9 October 1996 Friendly	Saudi Arabia	0–0	Australia
		Report

15 October 1996 1996 Gulf Cup	Saudi Arabia	1–0	Oman	Muscat, Oman
20:00 UTC+4	Al-Mehallel 75'	Report		Stadium: Sultan Qaboos Sports Complex; Attendance: 45,000; Referee: Masayoshi Okada (Japan)

19 October 1996 1996 Gulf Cup	Qatar	2–2	Saudi Arabia	Muscat, Oman
20:00 UTC+4		Report		Stadium: Sultan Qaboos Sports Complex; Referee: Masayoshi Okada (Japan)

21 October 1996 1996 Gulf Cup	Saudi Arabia	3–1	Bahrain	Muscat, Oman
20:00 UTC+4		Report		Stadium: Sultan Qaboos Sports Complex; Referee: Sidi Bekaye Magassa (Mali)

24 October 1996 1996 Gulf Cup	Kuwait	1–0	Saudi Arabia	Muscat, Oman
20:00 UTC+4		Report		Stadium: Sultan Qaboos Sports Complex; Attendance: 5,000; Referee: Saeed Abdullah (United Arab Emirates)

27 October 1996 1996 Gulf Cup	United Arab Emirates	2–2	Saudi Arabia	Muscat, Oman
20:00 UTC+4		Report		Stadium: Sultan Qaboos Sports Complex; Referee: Saad Kameel Al-Fadhli (Kuwait)

6 November 1996 Friendly	Saudi Arabia	1–0	Bulgaria
		Report

14 November 1996 Friendly	Saudi Arabia	3–1	Syria	Riyadh, Saudi Arabia
	Al-Temawi 20' (pen.); Massad 23'; Anwar 38'	Report	Kurdughli 88'	Stadium: Prince Faisal bin Fahd Stadium; Referee: Abdul Aziz Al Dokhail (Saudi Arabia)

19 November 1996 Friendly	Saudi Arabia	1–3	Mali	Khobar, Saudi Arabia
	Diallo 41' (o.g.)	Report	S. Coulibaly 5'; Dissa 70', 82'	Stadium: Prince Saud bin Jalawi Stadium; Referee: Omer Al Mehannah (Saudi Arabia)

29 November 1996 Friendly	Saudi Arabia	4–1	Indonesia
		Report

5 December 1996 1996 Asian Cup	Saudi Arabia	6–0	Thailand	Dubai, United Arab Emirates
16:45 UTC+4	Al-Temawi 10' (pen.), 29' (pen.); Al-Mehallel 15', 54'; Al-Muwallid 18'; Al-Jaber 52'	Report		Stadium: Al-Maktoum Stadium; Attendance: 5,000; Referee: Gamal Al-Ghandour (Egypt)

8 December 1996 1996 Asian Cup	Saudi Arabia	1–0	Iraq	Dubai, United Arab Emirates
16:45 UTC+4	Al-Mehallel 26'	Report		Stadium: Al-Maktoum Stadium; Attendance: 12,000; Referee: Ali Bujsaim (United Arab Emirates)

11 December 1996 1996 Asian Cup	Saudi Arabia	0–3	Iran	Dubai, United Arab Emirates
16:45 UTC+4		Report	Daei 12'; Bagheri 37'; Azizi 47'	Stadium: Al-Maktoum Stadium; Attendance: 12,000; Referee: Masayoshi Okada (Japan)

16 December 1996 1996 Asian Cup	Saudi Arabia	4–3	China	Abu Dhabi, United Arab Emirates
19:30 UTC+4	Al-Thunayan 31', 65'; Al-Jaber 34'; Al-Mehallel 43'	Report	Zhang Enhua 6', 89'; Peng Weiguo 16'	Stadium: Sheikh Zayed Stadium; Attendance: 5,000; Referee: Mohd Nazri Abdullah (Malaysia)

18 December 1996 1996 Asian Cup	Iran	0–0 (a.e.t.) (3–4 p)	Saudi Arabia	Abu Dhabi, United Arab Emirates
19:30 UTC+4		Report		Stadium: Sheikh Zayed Stadium; Attendance: 35,000; Referee: Gamal Al-Ghandour (Egypt)
	Penalties
	Daei (penalty missed); Peyrovani (penalty scored); Yazdani (penalty missed); Estili (penalty scored); Bagheri (penalty scored); Khakpour (penalty missed)		(penalty missed) Al-Temawi; (penalty scored) Sulaimani; (penalty scored) Zubromawi; (penalty missed) Al-Muwallid; (penalty scored) Al-Harbi; (penalty scored) Madani

21 December 1996 1996 Asian Cup	United Arab Emirates	0–0 (a.e.t.) (2–4 p)	Saudi Arabia	Abu Dhabi, United Arab Emirates
19:30 UTC+4		Report		Stadium: Sheikh Zayed Stadium; Attendance: 60,000; Referee: Mohd Nazri Abdullah (Malaysia)
	Penalties
	M. Ali (penalty scored); Saleh (penalty missed); K. Saad (penalty scored); Saeed (penalty missed)		(penalty scored) Al-Thunayan; (penalty scored) Zubromawi; (penalty missed) Al-Harbi; (penalty scored) Al-Temawi; (penalty scored) Al-Muwallid

=== 1997 ===
2 March 1997 Friendly	Saudi Arabia	3–0	Syria	Riyadh, Saudi Arabia
	Zubromawi 4'; Al-Shahrani 35'; A. Al-Dosari 90'	Report		Stadium: Prince Faisal bin Fahd Stadium

4 March 1997 Friendly	Saudi Arabia	1–1	Syria	Riyadh, Saudi Arabia
	A. Al-Dosari 85'	Report	Jokhadar 47'	Stadium: Prince Faisal bin Fahd Stadium

9 March 1997 Friendly	Saudi Arabia	4–0	Indonesia	Hougang, Singapore
		Report		Stadium: Hougang Stadium

11 March 1997 Friendly	Saudi Arabia	1–1	Indonesia	Hougang, Singapore
		Report		Stadium: Hougang Stadium

16 March 1997 1998 FWCQ	Chinese Taipei	0–2	Saudi Arabia	Shah Alam, Malaysia
		Report	O. Al-Dosari 34'; Al-Shahrani 37'	Stadium: Shah Alam Stadium; Attendance: 15,000; Referee: Hiroyuki Umemoto (Japan)

18 March 1997 1998 FWCQ	Malaysia	0–0	Saudi Arabia	Shah Alam, Malaysia
		Report		Stadium: Shah Alam Stadium; Attendance: 20,000; Referee: Hiroyuki Umemoto (Japan)

20 March 1997 1998 FWCQ	Bangladesh	1–4	Saudi Arabia	Shah Alam, Malaysia
	Rana 44'	Report	Al-Muwallid 20'; Al-Temawi 27'; Al-Shahrani 65'; Al-Mehallel 73'	Stadium: Shah Alam Stadium; Attendance: 5,000; Referee: Fong Fat Wah (Hong Kong)

27 March 1997 1998 FWCQ	Saudi Arabia	3–0	Bangladesh
		Report

29 March 1997 1998 FWCQ	Saudi Arabia	3–0	Malaysia
		Report

31 March 1997 1998 FWCQ	Saudi Arabia	6–0	Chinese Taipei
		Report

14 September 1997 1998 FWCQ	Saudi Arabia	2–1	Kuwait
		Report

19 September 1997 1998 FWCQ	Iran	1–1	Saudi Arabia
		Report

25 September 1997 Friendly	Saudi Arabia	5–1	Mali
		Report

3 October 1997 1998 FWCQ	China	1–0	Saudi Arabia
		Report

11 October 1997 1998 FWCQ	Saudi Arabia	1–0	Qatar
		Report

17 October 1997 1998 FWCQ	Kuwait	2–1	Saudi Arabia
		Report

24 October 1997 1998 FWCQ	Saudi Arabia	1–0	Iran
		Report

6 November 1997 1998 FWCQ	Saudi Arabia	1–1	China
		Report

12 November 1997 1998 FWCQ	Qatar	0–1	Saudi Arabia
		Report

7 December 1997 Friendly	Saudi Arabia	0–0	Iceland
		Report

12 December 1997 Friendly	Saudi Arabia	0–3	Brazil
		Report

14 December 1997 Friendly	Saudi Arabia	0–5	Mexico
		Report

16 December 1997 Friendly	Saudi Arabia	1–0	Australia
		Report

=== 1998 ===
22 February 1998 Friendly	Saudi Arabia	0–3	Germany	Riyadh, Saudi Arabia
20:00 UTC+3		Report	Möller 19'; Helmer 72'; Marschall 90'	Stadium: King Fahd International Stadium; Attendance: 17,000; Referee: Sultan Khamis (Bahrain)

4 May 1998 Friendly	Jamaica	0–0	Saudi Arabia
		Report

9 May 1998 Friendly	Saudi Arabia	2–1	Trinidad and Tobago
		Report

12 May 1998 Friendly	Saudi Arabia	1–1	Iceland
		Report

17 May 1998 Friendly	Saudi Arabia	2–1	Namibia
		Report

23 May 1998 Friendly	England	0–0	Saudi Arabia
		Report

27 May 1998 Friendly	Norway	6–0	Saudi Arabia
		Report

3 June 1998 Friendly	Saudi Arabia	0–0	Mexico
		Report

12 June 1998 1998 FWC	Saudi Arabia	0–1	Denmark	Lens, France
17:30 UTC+2		Report	Rieper 69'	Stadium: Stade Félix Bollaert; Attendance: 38,100; Referee: Javier Castrilli (Argentina)

18 June 1998 1998 FWC	France	4–0	Saudi Arabia	Saint-Denis, France
21:00 UTC+2	Henry 37', 78'; Trezeguet 68'; Lizarazu 85'	Report		Stadium: Stade de France; Attendance: 80,000; Referee: Arturo Brizio Carter (Mexico)

24 June 1998 1998 FWC	South Africa	2–2	Saudi Arabia	Bordeaux, France
16:00 UTC+2	Bartlett 18', 90+3' (pen.)	Report	Al-Jaber 45+2' (pen.); Al-Thunayan 74' (pen.)	Stadium: Parc Lescure; Attendance: 31,800; Referee: Mario Sánchez (Chile)

11 September 1998 Friendly	Saudi Arabia	8–0	Tanzania
		Report

14 September 1998 Friendly	Saudi Arabia	2–1	Sudan
		Report

17 September 1998 Friendly	Saudi Arabia	3–2	Senegal
		Report

27 September 1998 1998 Arab Cup	Lebanon	1–4	Saudi Arabia	Doha, Qatar
	Al-Indari 88'	Report	Al-Dosari 28', 38', 77'; Al-Temyat 82'	Stadium: Jassim bin Hamad Stadium; Attendance: 13,000; Referee: Juma'a Al-Ali (Qatar)

29 September 1998 1998 Arab Cup	Saudi Arabia	2–1	Kuwait	Doha, Qatar
	Al-Thunayan 65'; Al Temawi 79'	Report	Youssouf 3'	Stadium: Jassim bin Hamad Stadium; Attendance: 20,000; Referee: Hisham Qirat (Tunisia)

1 October 1998 1998 Arab Cup	Qatar	1–3	Saudi Arabia	Doha, Qatar
	Mustafa 82'	Report	Al-Dosari 28', 49', 64'	Stadium: Khalifa International Stadium; Attendance: 25,000; Referee: Abdulaziz Hassan (Bahrain)

31 October 1998 1998 Gulf Cup	Saudi Arabia	2–1	Kuwait	Riffa, Bahrain
		Report		Stadium: Bahrain National Stadium

2 November 1998 1998 Gulf Cup	Saudi Arabia	1–1	Bahrain	Riffa, Bahrain
		Report		Stadium: Bahrain National Stadium

5 November 1998 1998 Gulf Cup	Saudi Arabia	1–0	Oman	Riffa, Bahrain
		Report		Stadium: Bahrain National Stadium

8 November 1998 1998 Gulf Cup	Saudi Arabia	1–0	United Arab Emirates	Riffa, Bahrain
		Report		Stadium: Bahrain National Stadium

11 November 1998 1998 Gulf Cup	Saudi Arabia	0–0	Qatar	Riffa, Bahrain
		Report		Stadium: Bahrain National Stadium

=== 1999 ===
18 June 1999 Friendly	Saudi Arabia	2–0	Jordan
		Report

22 June 1999 Friendly	Saudi Arabia	2–1	Jordan
		Report

9 July 1999 Friendly	Canada	0–2	Saudi Arabia
		Report

13 July 1999 Friendly	Jamaica	2–1	Saudi Arabia
		Report

15 July 1999 Friendly	Jamaica	0–4	Saudi Arabia
		Report

17 July 1999 Friendly	Costa Rica	1–0	Saudi Arabia
		Report

25 July 1999 1999 FIFA Confederations Cup	Mexico	5–1	Saudi Arabia	Mexico City, Mexico
14:30 CDT	Blanco 12', 19', 68', 77'; Abundis 21'	Report	Al-Temyat 62' (pen.)	Stadium: Estadio Azteca; Attendance: 85,000; Referee: Óscar Ruiz (Colombia)

27 July 1999 1999 FIFA Confederations Cup	Saudi Arabia	0–0	Bolivia	Mexico City, Mexico
18:00 CDT		Report		Stadium: Estadio Azteca; Attendance: 65,000; Referee: Brian Hall (United States)

29 July 1999 1999 FIFA Confederations Cup	Egypt	1–5	Saudi Arabia	Mexico City, Mexico
18:00 CDT	S. Ibrahim 70' (pen.)	Report	Al-Otaibi 8', 34', 78', 85'; Al-Shahrani 64'	Stadium: Estadio Azteca; Attendance: 15,000; Referee: Ubaldo Aquino (Paraguay)

1 August 1999 1999 FIFA Confederations Cup	Brazil	8–2	Saudi Arabia	Guadalajara, Mexico
15:00 CDT	João Carlos 8'; Ronaldinho 11', 65', 90+2'; Zé Roberto 33'; Alex 36', 86'; Rôni 62'	Report	Al-Otaibi 22', 31'	Stadium: Estadio Jalisco; Attendance: 48,000; Referee: Óscar Ruiz (Colombia)

3 August 1999 1999 FIFA Confederations Cup	United States	2–0	Saudi Arabia	Guadalajara, Mexico
21:00 CDT	Bravo 27'; McBride 78'	Report		Stadium: Estadio Jalisco; Attendance: 38,000; Referee: Ubaldo Aquino (Paraguay)

8 September 1999 Friendly	Zambia	0–0	Saudi Arabia	Harare, Zimbabwe
16:30 UTC+2		Report		Stadium: National Sports Stadium

11 September 1999 Friendly	Zambia	1–2	Saudi Arabia	Harare, Zimbabwe
16:30 UTC+2		Report		Stadium: National Sports Stadium

18 September 1999 1997 Afro-Asian Cup of Nations	South Africa	1–0	Saudi Arabia	Cape Town, South Africa
20:30 UTC+2	Ndlanya 48'	Report		Stadium: Green Point Stadium; Attendance: 20,000; Referee: Felix Tangawarima (Zimbabwe)

30 September 1999 1997 Afro-Asian Cup of Nations	Saudi Arabia	0–0	South Africa	Riyadh, Saudi Arabia
17:00 UTC+3		Report		Stadium: King Fahd International Stadium; Attendance: 50,000; Referee: Saad Kamil (Kuwait)

== See also ==
- Saudi Arabia national football team results (2000–09)
- Saudi Arabia national football team results (2010–19)
- Saudi Arabia national football team results (2020–present)
