= Mohamed Al-Deayea =

Saudi Arabian footballer (born 1972)

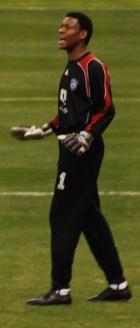
- Al-Deayea with Al-Hilal in 2010

Personal information
- Full name: Mohamed Abdullaziz Al-Deayea Al-Shammari
- Date of birth: 2 August 1972 (age 54)
- Place of birth: Ha'il, Saudi Arabia
- Height: 1.89 m (6 ft 2 in)
- Position: Goalkeeper

Youth career
- 1986-1989: Al-Ta'ee

Senior career*
Years	Team	Apps	(Gls)
1989–1999	Al-Ta'ee	176	(0)
1999–2010	Al-Hilal	237	(0)
Total		413	(0)

International career
1993–2006	Saudi Arabia	178	(0)
Medal record
Representing Saudi Arabia
Men's football
AFC Asian Cup
Winner	1996 United Arab Emirates
Runner-up	2000 Lebanon
FIFA U-17 World Cup
Winner	1989 Scotland
- * Club domestic league appearances and goals

Mohamed Abdullaziz Al-Deayea Al-Shammari (Arabic: مُحَمَّد عَبْد الْعَزِيز الدَّعْيَع الشَّمَّرِيّ; born 2 August 1972), also known as Mohammed Deayea al-Shammari, is a Saudi Arabian former professional footballer who played as a goalkeeper. He participated in four FIFA World Cups for the Saudi Arabia national team and earned a total of 178 officially recognised caps. Al-Deayea played for al-Tai FC and al-Hilal SFC and was represented in all Saudi national teams. He is considered one of the prominent goalkeepers in the history of Saudi sports.

== Early life and club career ==
Mohammed al-Deayea was born in Hail into a family passionate about sports. He initially started as a handball goalkeeper for al-Tai FC at eight years old but switched to football following a recommendation from the club's junior football coach. He joined al-Tai SFC's junior team in 1988, impressing enough to earn a spot on the Saudi junior national team. With this team, he triumphed at the FIFA U-16 World Championship in Scotland in 1989. He progressed to the youth national team and by 1993, he was playing for the senior Saudi national team.

Al-Deayea played a pivotal role in the national team's qualification for the 1994 FIFA World Cup in the United States, where he excelled. In 1999, al-Hilal SFC acquired him in a high-profile transfer, and he defended their goal until retiring in 2010, capping a twenty-two-year career. A testimonial match was organized in 2012 to honor his contributions, featuring a game between Italy's Juventus and al-Hilal SFC. Despite his qualifications, Al-Deayea is the joint holder of a negative record: most goals conceded by a goalkeeper in FIFA World Cups, tied with Mexican legend Antonio Carbajal, having conceded 25 goals in 10 matches across the three tournaments in which he played (1994, 1998 and 2002). About a third of these came in a single match, in the 2002 tournament, where Germany thrashed an out-of-sorts Saudi team by an 8-0 score.

Al-Deayea has split his professional career between the clubs Al-Ta'ee and Al-Hilal. Originally, he started as a handball player, but was convinced by his club and his older brother Abdullah to become a professional footballer. Mohammed was under great pressure of expectations in the beginning of his career because his brother Abdullah was an AFC Asian Cup winner and a highly reputed goalkeeper.

== Retirement ==
On 22 June 2010, Mohamed Al-Deayea announced his retirement from football at the age of 37. On 5 January 2012, a testimonial match for him was organised between his club Al-Hilal and Juventus, with 70,000 people attending at the King Fahd Stadium. The match ended 7–1 in favour of Juventus with Al-Hilal's sole goal coming from Saad Al-Harthi. Juventus' goals were scored by Alessandro Del Piero (twice), Eljero Elia, Arturo Vidal, Giorgio Chiellini, Simone Pepe and Fabio Quagliarella.

== Career statistics ==
=== Club ===
Appearances and goals by club, season and competition
Club	Season	League		Cup		ACL		Total	
Club	Season	Apps	Goals	Apps	Goals	Apps	Goals	Apps	Goals
Al-Ta'ee	1991–92	22	0	—		—		22	0
Al-Ta'ee	1992–93	22	0	—		—		22	0
Al-Ta'ee	1993–94	22	0	—		—		22	0
Al-Ta'ee	1994–95	22	0	—		—		22	0
Al-Ta'ee	1995–96	22	0	—		—		22	0
Al-Ta'ee	1996–97	22	0	—		—		22	0
Al-Ta'ee	1997–98	22	0	—		—		22	0
Al-Ta'ee	1998–99	22	0	—		—		22	0
Al-Ta'ee	Total	176	0	0	0	0	0	176	0
Al-Hilal	1999–00	22	0	4	0	7	0	33	0
Al-Hilal	2000–01	22	0	2	0	—		24	0
Al-Hilal	2001–02	22	0	—		5	0	27	0
Al-Hilal	2002–03	22	0	4	0	—		26	0
Al-Hilal	2003–04	22	0	4	0	3	0	29	0
Al-Hilal	2004–05	22	0	5	0	4	0	31	0
Al-Hilal	2005–06	22	0	5	0	—		27	0
Al-Hilal	2006–07	21	0	4	0	6	0	31	0
Al-Hilal	2007–08	21	0	5	0	6	0	32	0
Al-Hilal	2008–09	21	0	4	0	7	0	32	0
Al-Hilal	2009–10	20	0	1	0	4	0	25	0
Al-Hilal	Total	237	0	38	0	42	0	306	0
Career total		413	0	38	0	42	0	493	0

=== International ===
Appearances and goals by national team and year
National team	Year	Apps	Goals
Saudi Arabia	1993	20	0
Saudi Arabia	1994	22	0
Saudi Arabia	1995	6	0
Saudi Arabia	1996	21	0
Saudi Arabia	1997	23	0
Saudi Arabia	1998	22	0
Saudi Arabia	1999	16	0
Saudi Arabia	2000	12	0
Saudi Arabia	2001	12	0
Saudi Arabia	2002	12	0
Saudi Arabia	2003	0	0
Saudi Arabia	2004	3	0
Saudi Arabia	2005	2	0
Saudi Arabia	2006	7	0
Total		178	0

== Honours ==
Al-Ta'ee

- Saudi First Division: 1994–95

Al-Hilal

- Saudi Premier League: 2001–02, 2004–05, 2007–08, 2009–10
- Saudi Crown Prince Cup: 1999–2000, 2003, 2004–05, 2005–06, 2007–08, 2008–09, 2009–10
- Saudi Founder's Cup: 1999–2000
- AFC Champions League: 1999–2000
- Asian Cup Winners Cup: 2001–02
- Asian Super Cup: 2000
- Arab Cup Winners' Cup: 2000
- Arab Super Cup: 2001

Saudi Arabia U17

- FIFA U-17 World Cup: 1989

Saudi Arabia

- AFC Asian Cup: 1996
- Arabian Gulf Cup: 1994, 2003
- Arab Nations Cup: 1998
- Islamic Solidarity Games: 2005

Individual

- AFC Asian Cup Team of the Tournament: 1996
- FIFA Confederations Cup All-Star Team: 1997
- AFC Asian All-Star: 1997, 2000
- IFFHS Asia's Goalkeeper of the Century: 1999
- AFC Fans' All-time XI at the FIFA World Cup: 2020
- IFFHS Asian Men's Team of All Time: 2021
- AFC Asian Cup All-time XI: 2023

== See also ==
- List of men's footballers with 100 or more international caps
