= Fahad Al-Musaibeah =

Saudi Arabian footballer

Personal information
- Full name: Fahad Mohammed Al-Musaibeah
- Date of birth: 4 April 1961 (age 65)
- Place of birth: Riyadh, Saudi Arabia
- Position: Midfielder

Senior career*
Years	Team	Apps	(Gls)
1979–1991	Al-Hilal		

International career
1980–1989	Saudi Arabia	96	(6)
- * Club domestic league appearances and goals

Fahad Al-Musaibeah is a Saudi football midfielder who played for Saudi Arabia in the 1984 Olympic Games.

== International goals ==
No.	Date	Venue	Opponent	Score	Result	Competition
1.	28 October 1989	Jalan Besar Stadium, Kallang, Singapore	North Korea	1–0	2–0	1990 FIFA World Cup qualification

== Record at FIFA Tournaments ==
Year	Competition	Apps	Goal
1981–1989	FIFA World Cup qualification	21	2
1984	1984 Olympic Games	3	0
Total		24	2
