= Wang Baoshan =

Chinese footballer

Wang Baoshan 王宝山
Personal information
- Full name: Wang Baoshan
- Date of birth: April 13, 1963 (age 63)
- Place of birth: Pingyi, Shandong, China
- Position: Striker

Team information
- Current team: Shenzhen 2028 (head coach)

Senior career*
Years	Team	Apps	(Gls)
1980–1986	Shaanxi Province		
1991–1993	Otsuka Pharmaceutical		

International career
1986–1990	China	23	(2)

Managerial career
- 1995–1997: Foshan Fosti
- 1998: Yunnan Hongta
- 2001–2002: China U-20
- 2003–2004: Guangdong Xiongying
- 2005: Jiangsu Sainty
- 2005–2006: Shenzhen Jianlibao
- 2007–2008: China (assistant)
- 2009–2010: Chengdu Blades
- 2012: Chengdu Blades
- 2013–2015: Chongqing Lifan
- 2016–2017: Beijing Renhe
- 2017–2018: Shenzhen FC
- 2018–2020: Henan Jianye
- 2020: Tianjin TEDA
- 2022: Shaanxi Chang'an Athletic
- 2024: Shenzhen 2028 (team manager)
- 2025–: Shenzhen 2028
- * Club domestic league appearances and goals as of Jan 1, 2012

Wang Baoshan (Chinese: 王宝山; born on April 13, 1963) is a Chinese former international football player. As a player he represented Shaanxi Province before being one of the first Chinese players who went to Japan when he joined Otsuka Pharmaceutical. Internationally he played for the Chinese national team at the 1988 AFC Asian Cup

== Playing career ==
While Wang Baoshan was born in Pingyi, Shandong his family would move to Baoji in Shaanxi to see him graduate to the senior team of the Shaanxi Province football club by the 1980 Chinese league season. Unfortunately for Wang in his debut season he was part of the squad that came bottom of the league and his club were relegated at the end of the campaign. His time within the second tier would see him establish himself within the team and by the 1985 league season he would help aid Shaanxi win promotion back into the top tier, which soon caught the attention of the Chinese national team. With the national team he would play within the 1988 AFC Asian Cup and was part of the team that came fourth within the tournament. When he returned to club football he would move to Japan and joined Otsuka Pharmaceutical before he retired.

== International goals ==
No.	Date	Venue	Opponent	Score	Result	Competition
1.	23 February 1989	Tianhe Stadium, Guangzhou, China	Bangladesh	1–0	2–0	1990 FIFA World Cup qualification
2.	4 March 1989	Dhaka Stadium, Dhaka, Bangladesh	Bangladesh	1–0	2–0	1990 FIFA World Cup qualification

== Management career ==
Wang Baoshan got his break in club management with second-tier football club Foshan Fosti in the 1995 league season and helped guide the club to a fifth-place finish. For the next several seasons he would guide the club to mid-table mediocrity until the club were taken over by Xiamen Yuanhua at the beginning of the 1998 league season and was subsequently released by the club. Wang wouldn't have to wait long for a new job and would take on the position of general manager for another second-tier club Yunnan Hongta, however he would quickly also serve as the club's manager for one season before he would settle on becoming the team's youth team manager for the next two seasons. His work with the youth team would quickly draw the attentions of the China U-20 team and he would lead them into the 2002 AFC Youth Championship where the team finished in a disappointing sixth-place finish. After the tournament the Chinese Football Association would decide not to renew his contract and Wang would join another second-tier football club Guangdong Xiongying in the 2003 league season and guide the team to a mid-table position. The following season saw the club decide to move to Shenzhen and rename themselves Shenzhen Kejian, Wang would again guide the club to another mid-table position, however the club was severely in debt and dissolved at the end of the 2004 league season.

Wang would join another second-tier football club in Jiangsu Sainty, however his time with them only lasted one season when he was unable to win promotion with the club. In November 2005 Wang would receive his first attempt at the top tier when he was offered the management post at Shenzhen Jianlibao and led them into the 2006 league season. His time at the club was not very successful, he had lost the respect of the players and was floating above relegation also the club were in debt and could not afford to be relegated, which saw in September 2006 Wang being sacked as the team's manager and replaced by Xie Feng for the rest of the season. Wang would take a step back from being a Head coach and take on the assistant management position with the Chinese national team where he worked under Vladimir Petrović. The Chinese Football Association would sack Petrović in June 2008 which saw the National team without a Head coach to lead them into important 2011 AFC Asian Cup qualification matches, being the only assistant with top flight management experience there were rumours that Wang would lead the national team on at least a short-term basis, however the Chinese FA decided to bring in experienced coach Yin Tiesheng in instead. Strangely enough in July 2008 after being sacked from Shenzhen Jianlibao the club took him back but this time as a technical advisor.

In May 2009 the Head coach position at top-tier club Chengdu Blades became available after their previous manager Li Bing resigned, under Wang results would improve throughout the season and he would go on to lead the team onto a respectable seventh-place finish. Despite this achievement Chengdu Blades were relegated to the second tier before the start of the 2010 league season for match fixing after it was discovered the club had fixed a match several years ago. Wang decided to stay loyal towards the club and remained as manager to aid the club win immediate promotion back into the top tier at the end of the 2010 league season. Despite this achievement the club decided that they needed a new manager and brought in Lawrie McKinna for the start of the 2011 Chinese Super League season. After over a year out of management Chengdu Blades who had fallen back into the second tier asked for Wang's help half-way through the 2012 China League One season after the previous manager Niu Hongli had resigned.

In 2013, Wang became the head coach of Chongqing Lifan.

On 27 September 2018, Henan Jianye signed Wang to replace Chang Woe-ryong.

On 20 January 2022, Wang was named as the manager of Shaanxi Chang'an Athletic.

== Managerial statistics ==
As of 19 July 2022

Naty	Team	From	To	Record							
Naty	Team	From	To	G	W	D	L	GF	GA	GD	Win %
(China)	Chengdu Blades	1 January 2009	31 December 2010	30	11	6	13	32	39	−7	36.67
(China)	Chongqing Lifan	10 December 2012	30 November 2015	54	28	12	14	90	82	+8	51.85
(China)	Beijing Renhe	8 December 2015	8 June 2017	45	22	10	13	69	49	+20	48.89
(China)	Shenzhen FC	14 June 2017	9 April 2018	22	9	4	9	35	27	+8	40.91
(China)	Henan Jianye	27 September 2018	6 July 2020	38	16	8	14	53	53	+0	42.11
(China)	Tianjin TEDA	19 August 2020	31 December 2020	20	5	5	10	22	28	−6	25.00
(China)	Shaanxi Chang'an Athletic	20 January 2022	19 July 2022	9	3	5	1	15	9	+6	33.33
Total				218	94	50	74	316	287	+29	43.12

Note: win or lose by penalty shoot-out is counted as the draw in time.
