= Zhang Huikang =

Chinese footballer

Zhang Huikang 张惠康
Personal information
- Full name: Zhang Huikang
- Date of birth: 22 July 1962 (age 64)
- Place of birth: Shanghai, China
- Height: 1.82 m (5 ft 11 1/2 in)
- Position: Goalkeeper

Senior career*
Years	Team	Apps	(Gls)
1982–1991	Shanghai		
1992–1993	South China		

International career
1987–1990	China	25	(0)
- * Club domestic league appearances and goals

Zhang Huikang (born 22 July 1962) is a Chinese football goalkeeper who played for China in the 1988 Asian Cup. He also played for Shanghai city team and South China in Hong Kong.

== Career statistics ==
=== International statistics ===
Year	Competition	Apps	Goal
1987–1990	Friendly	4	0
1988	AFC Asian Cup qualifiers	4	0
1988	Asian Cup	6	0
1989	FIFA World Cup qualification	8	0
1990	Dynasty Cup	2	0
Total		25	0
