= Abdullah Al-Deayea =

Saudi Arabian footballer

Personal information
- Full name: Abdullah Abdulaziz Al-Deayea
- Date of birth: 1 December 1961 (age 64)
- Place of birth: Ha'il, Saudi Arabia
- Height: 1.82 m (6 ft 0 in)
- Position: Goalkeeper

Senior career*
Years	Team	Apps	(Gls)
1979–1992	Al-Tai		
1992–1997	Al-Hilal		

International career
1984–1990	Saudi Arabia	58	(0)
- * Club domestic league appearances and goals

Abdullah Al-Deayea (Arabic: عبدالله الدعيع, born 1 December 1961) is a retired Saudi Arabian professional football goalkeeper who played for Al-Tai and Al-Hilal. He is the elder brother of the former goalkeeper Mohamed Al-Deayea and the father of Saudi footballers Bader Al-Deayea and Sultan Al-Deayea. Mohamed started off as a handball player and came to football at the age of 15 as a striker, following the advice of Abdullah.

== Honours ==
Al-Tai

- Saudi First Division: 1984–85
- Saudi Second Division: 1976–77

Al-Hilal

- Saudi Premier League: 1995–96
- Saudi Crown Prince Cup: 1995
- Saudi Federation Cup: 1992–93, 1995–96
- Asian Cup Winners' Cup: 1996–97
- Arab Club Champions Cup: 1994, 1995

Saudi Arabia

- AFC Asian Cup: 1984, 1988
