= Fahd Al-Bishi =

Saudi Arabian footballer (born 1965)

Fahad Al-Bishi
Personal information
- Full name: Fahad bin Al-Harifi bin Fahad Al-Husseini Al-Bishi
- Date of birth: 10 September 1965 (age 61)
- Place of birth: Bisha, Saudi Arabia
- Height: 1.74 m (5 ft 8 1/2 in)
- Position: Midfielder

Youth career
- 1982: Al-Nakhil
- 1982–1984: Al-Nassr

Senior career*
Years	Team	Apps	(Gls)
1984–2000	Al-Nassr	250	(74)

International career
1986–1994	Saudi Arabia	65	(24)
Medal record
Representing Saudi Arabia
AFC Asian Cup
Winner	1988 AFC Asian Cup
Runner-up	1992 AFC Asian Cup
Confederation Cup
Runner-up	1992 King Fahd Cup
- * Club domestic league appearances and goals

Fahad bin Al-Harifi bin Fahad Al-Husseini Al-Bishi (Arabic: فهد بن الهريفي بن فهد الحسيني البيشي; born 10 September 1965) is a former Saudi footballer who played for Al-Nassr FC and the Saudi Arabia national team. He represented his country at the 1994 FIFA World Cup.

== Club career ==
=== Early career ===
When he was young kid, Fahad played from Al-Nak'el Club, he moved to Al-Nassr was a small player in the Age 16 years old. Paulo César Carpegiani the coach gave him to chance to play in 1984 to prove his presence with the team.

=== Al-Nassr ===
First official goal scored by a player the team had before the agreement the Saudi city of Dammam, where he scored one of the goals of four Saudi victory in a match which ended outcome 4–1 on 29 August 1984.

Register for a team victory (74) goal is relatively low due to his participation with the team victory for three years, where he made the Union Saudi request to retire from football after a dispute with management victory. And have been approved for retirement and when he decided to return to his team rejected the Saudi and especially a member of the Saudi Federation (Saleh bin Nasser), but after three years of retirement speech. Although this article applies to the player who wants to return for another team is his team. As his team return to it whenever he wants. No longer to post victory, but after three years.

== International career ==
Such as the Saudi team for youth in 1985 and participated in the AFC Youth Championship, which was held in the UAE participated in the World Youth Cup in Moscow In 1986 joined the team first and announced his retirement from international partnerships in 1994 after participating actively in the World Cup in America.

He participated in many local tournaments and international and achieved with club and country many tournaments and achievements have won with the team championship 1988 AFC Asian Cup in Qatar and was the owner of the winning goal against team China as well as the owner penalty-kick shootout last in the final match against South Korean which the continental trophy to Saudi Arabia for the second time in a row, the solution with the team in the Asian after the Japanese team in the 1992 AFC Asian Cup in Japan, which won the Golden Boot-winning scorer in Asia that tournament, also achieved runner-up with the team in the FIFA Confederations Cup first in 1992 after lost to Argentina in final, but his first goal in the history of the tournament in the Confederations Cup against United States, solving with the team and in the summer at the Asian Games in 1987 in Korea after Korean team, and participated in the 1994 FIFA World Cup in America and lost in 16 round.

The record for the national team (24) official goals.

== International goals ==
No.	Date	Venue	Opponent	Score	Result	Competition
1.	12 December 1988	Hamad bin Khalifa Stadium, Doha, Qatar	China	1–0	1–0	1988 AFC Asian Cup
2.	15 March 1989	Jeddah, Saudi Arabia	Syria	1–0	5–4	1990 FIFA World Cup qualification
3.	12 October 1989	National Stadium, Kallang, Singapore	China	1–0	1–2	1990 FIFA World Cup qualification

== Honours ==
Al-Nassr

- Saudi Premier League: 1989, 1994, 1995
- King's Cup: 1986, 1987, 1990
- Saudi Federation Cup: 1998
- Asian Cup Winners Cup: 1998
- Asian Super Cup: 1998
- Gulf Club Champions Cup: 1996, 1997

Saudi Arabia

- AFC Asian Cup: 1988; runner-up 1992

Individual

- Asian Cup top scorer in 1992: 3 goals
- Second best Asian player: 1993
- Best Arab countries player: 1988
- First Arabian player to get Adidas Golden Boot
- First player to score in the 1992 King Fahd Cup, Saudi Arabia 3–0 USA
- First Asian and Arabian player to score in the FIFA Club World Cup in 1999 (in the match with Real Madrid)
- FIFA Club World Cup second top scorer: 2000
