= Hamad bin Khalifa Stadium =

Stadium in Doha, Qatar

Coordinates: 25°15′6.81″N 51°32′7.30″E

- Al Ahli Stadium
- Interactive map of Hamad bin Khalifa Stadium
- Location: Doha, Qatar
- Capacity: 12,000
- Surface: Grass

Tenants
- Al Ahli SC; Al Sailiya SC

Hamad bin Khalifa Stadium is a multi-purpose stadium in Doha, Qatar. It is the home ground of Al Ahli SC (Doha) and Al-Sailiya SC. The stadium holds 18,000 people. In addition to QSL matches, the stadium also hosts regular track and field meets.

== See also ==
- Lists of stadiums
- List of football stadiums in Qatar

Preceded by National Stadium; Singapore	AFC Asian Cup; Final Venue; 1988	Succeeded by Hiroshima Big Arch (Japan) Hiroshima
