= Mohamed Salim =

Emirati footballer (born 1968)

Personal information
- Full name: Mohamed Salim Mubarak
- Date of birth: 1968 (age 57–58)
- Place of birth: United Arab Emirates

International career
Years	Team	Apps	(Gls)
- United Arab Emirates

Mohamed Salim Mubarak (Arabic: مُحَمَّد سَلِيم مُبَارَك; born 1968) is a footballer from the UAE who played as a defender for Al-Ahli Club in Dubai, and the UAE national football team. He was in the squad of UAE team in the 1990 FIFA World Cup in Italy but never played in the tournament.
