= 1988 AFC Asian Cup =

كأس آسيا 1988

Tournament details
- Host country: Qatar
- Dates: 2–18 December
- Teams: 10
- Venues: 2 (in 1 host city)

Final positions
- Champions: Saudi Arabia (2nd title)
- Runners-up: South Korea
- Third place: Iran
- Fourth place: China

Tournament statistics
- Matches played: 24
- Goals scored: 40 (1.67 per match)
- Attendance: 164,500 (6,854 per match)
- Top scorer: (South Korea) Lee Tae-Ho (3 goals)
- Best player: (South Korea) Kim Joo-Sung
- Best goalkeeper: (China) Zhang Huikang

The 1988 AFC Asian Cup (Arabic: كأس آسيا 1988) was the ninth international association football championship for members of the Asian Football Confederation (AFC). Hosted by Qatar, the competition ran from 2 to 17 December 1988 and was contested by the national teams of Bahrain, China, Iran, Japan, Kuwait, Qatar, Saudi Arabia, South Korea, Syria and the United Arab Emirates.

The final was contested by South Korea and defending champions Saudi Arabia. After a goalless draw in regulation time and after extra time, the final was the first to require a penalty shoot-out to determine a winner. Saudi Arabia successfully defended their title after winning the shoot-out 4–3.

== Background ==
The inaugural AFC Asian Cup was held in Hong Kong in 1956. Saudi Arabia were the defending champions after defeating China 2–0 in the final of the previous edition in 1984. Iran were the most successful team in the history of the competition, having won the title three times previously.

== Qualification ==
Qatar qualified automatically as hosts and Saudi Arabia qualified automatically as holders. In total, 24 teams were included in the qualifying draw but four would withdraw without playing a match.

The teams were split into four qualifying groups of six. The United Arab Emirates and China qualified as the winners and runners-up respectively of group one. In group two, Kuwait and Japan qualified as group winners and runners-up respectively. Syria and Iran qualified as group winners and runners-up respectively of group three. Bahrain and South Korea qualified from group four as group winners and runners-up respectively.

=== Participants ===
Japan contested the qualifiers and the final tournament with a B team as the Japan Football Association prioritised domestic fixtures.

Nations qualified for the 1988 AFC Asian Cup
Team	Qualified as	Qualified on	Previous appearance
Qatar	Hosts	N/A	2 (1980, 1984)
Saudi Arabia	1984 AFC Asian Cup champions	16 December 1984	1 (1984)
United Arab Emirates	Group 1 winners	17 February 1988	2 (1980, 1984)
China	Group 1 runners-up	16 February 1988	3 (1976, 1980, 1984)
Kuwait	Group 2 winners	18 April 1988	4 (1972, 1976, 1980, 1984)
Japan	Group 2 runners-up	18 April 1988	0 (debut)
Syria	Group 3 winners	3 June 1988	2 (1980, 1984)
Iran	Group 3 runners-up	4 June 1988	5 (1968, 1972, 1976, 1980, 1984)
Bahrain	Group 4 winners	22 June 1988	0 (debut)
South Korea	Group 4 runners-up	22 June 1988	6 (1956, 1960, 1964, 1972, 1980, 1984)

== Format ==
The 10 teams were drawn into two single round robin groups of five teams. The group winners and runners-up would contest the semi-finals which would decide the teams contesting the final and the third-place play-off.

== Venues ==
Matches were played at the Al-Ahly Stadium and the Qatar SC Stadium in Doha.

Venues of the 1988 AFC Asian Cup
1 Al-Ahly Stadium
2 Qatar SC Stadium

City	Stadium	Capacity
Doha	Al-Ahly Stadium	20,000
Doha	Qatar SC Stadium	20,000

== Group stage ==
=== Group A ===
South Korea and Iran advanced to the semi-finals.

==== Table ====
Pos	Team	Pld	W	D	L	GF	GA	GD	Pts	Qualification
1	South Korea	4	4	0	0	9	2	+7	8	Advance to semi-finals
2	Iran	4	2	1	1	3	3	0	5	Advance to semi-finals
3	Qatar	4	2	0	2	7	6	+1	4	
4	United Arab Emirates	4	1	0	3	2	4	−2	2	
5	Japan	4	0	1	3	0	6	−6	1	

==== Matches ====
2 December 1988
16:00

Iran	2–0	Qatar
Bavi 6'; Pious 89'

Al-Ahly Stadium, Doha
Attendance: 15,000
Referee: Michel Vautrot (France)

3 December 1988
15:00

United Arab Emirates	0–1	South Korea
		Lee Tae-ho 8' (pen.)

Al-Ahly Stadium, Doha
Attendance: 200
Referee: George Courtney (England)

4 December 1988
15:00

Japan	0–0	Iran

Qatar SC Stadium, Doha
Attendance: 2,000
Referee: Samuel Chan Yam Ming (Hong Kong)

5 December 1988
17:00

Qatar	2–1	United Arab Emirates
Muftah 17'; Musabah 26' (o.g.)		H. Mohamed 35'

Qatar SC Stadium, Doha
Attendance: 2,000
Referee: Erik Fredriksson (Sweden)

6 December 1988
15:00

South Korea	2–0	Japan
Hwang Sun-hong 13'; Kim Joo-sung 35'

Qatar SC Stadium, Doha
Attendance: 1,000
Referee: Salah Mohammed (Iraq)

8 December 1988
15:00

Iran	1–0	United Arab Emirates
Pious 27'

Qatar SC Stadium, Doha
Attendance: 4,000
Referee: Steven Ovinis (Malaysia)

9 December 1988
17:00

Qatar	2–3	South Korea
Salman 47' (pen.), 80' (pen.)		Chung Hae-won 10', 72'; Kim Joo-sung 34'

Qatar SC Stadium, Doha
Attendance: 15,000
Referee: George Courtney (England)

10 December 1988
15:00

United Arab Emirates	1–0	Japan
A.A. Mohamed 86'

Al-Ahly Stadium, Doha
Attendance: 1,000
Referee: Ahmad Bash (Jordan)

11 December 1988
17:00

South Korea	3–0	Iran
Byun Byung-joo 26', 57'; Hwang Sun-hong 42'

Al-Ahly Stadium, Doha
Attendance: 2,000
Referee: Neji Jouini (Tunisia)

12 December 1988
17:00

Japan	0–3	Qatar
		Khamis 58', 82'; Muftah 90'

Al-Ahly Stadium, Doha
Attendance: 10,000
Referee: Yusuf Namoğlu (Turkey)

=== Group B ===
Saudi Arabia and China advanced to the semi-finals.

==== Table ====
Pos	Team	Pld	W	D	L	GF	GA	GD	Pts	Qualification
1	Saudi Arabia	4	2	2	0	4	1	+3	6	Advance to semi-finals
2	China	4	2	1	1	6	3	+3	5	Advance to semi-finals
3	Syria	4	2	0	2	2	5	−3	4	
4	Kuwait	4	0	3	1	2	3	−1	3	
5	Bahrain	4	0	2	2	1	3	−2	2	

==== Matches ====
2 December 1988
18:00

Syria	0–2	Saudi Arabia
		Al-Mutlaq 20'; Al-Suwaiyed 82'

Qatar SC Stadium, Doha
Attendance: 15,000
Referee: Erik Fredriksson (Sweden)

3 December 1988
17:00

Kuwait	0–0	Bahrain

Al-Ahly Stadium, Doha
Attendance: 3,000
Referee: Vincent Mauro (United States)

4 December 1988
17:00

China	3–0	Syria
Gao Sheng 13'; Xie Yuxin 14', 19'

Qatar SC Stadium, Doha
Attendance: 3,000
Referee: Mohamed Hansal (Algeria)

5 December 1988
15:00

Saudi Arabia	0–0	Kuwait

Al-Ahly Stadium, Doha
Attendance: 15,000
Referee: Michel Vautrot (France)

6 December 1988
17:00

Bahrain	0–1	China
		Zhang Xiaowen 78'

Qatar SC Stadium, Doha
Attendance: 1,000
Referee: Syed Shahid Hakim (India)

8 December 1988
17:00

Syria	1–0	Kuwait
Al-Nasser 63'

Al-Ahly Stadium, Doha
Attendance: 2,000
Referee: Yusuf Namoğlu (Turkey)

9 December 1988
15:00

Saudi Arabia	1–1	Bahrain
Jazea'a 78'		F. Mahmoud 44' (pen.)

Qatar SC Stadium, Doha
Attendance: 10,000
Referee: Vincent Mauro (United States)

10 December 1988
17:00

Kuwait	2–2	China
Adel Abbas 60' (pen.); Mansour Basha 62'		Ma Lin 10', 87'

Al-Ahly Stadium, Doha
Attendance: 8,000
Referee: Erik Fredriksson (Sweden)

11 December 1988
15:00

Bahrain	0–1	Syria
		Abu Al-Sel 72' (pen.)

Qatar SC Stadium, Doha
Attendance: 800
Referee: Michel Vautrot (France)

12 December 1988
15:00

China	0–1	Saudi Arabia
		Al-Bishi 56'

Al-Ahly Stadium, Doha
Attendance: 15,000
Referee: Mohamed Hansal (Algeria)

== Semi-finals ==
South Korea defeated China after extra time and Saudi Arabia defeated Iran to advance to the final.

14 December 1988
16:00

South Korea	2–1 (a.e.t.)	China
Lee Tae-ho 93', 103'		Mai Chao 100'

Qatar SC Stadium, Doha
Attendance: 1,000
Referee: Vincent Mauro (United States)

15 December 1988
16:00

Saudi Arabia	1–0	Iran
Abdullah 16'

Qatar SC Stadium, Doha
Attendance: 17,000
Referee: George Courtney (England)

== Third-place play-off ==
After a goalless draw, Iran defeated China 3–0 on penalties to finish third.

17 December 1988
16:00

China	0–0 (a.e.t.)	Iran
Penalties
Duan Ju (penalty missed); Wang Baoshan (penalty missed); Wu Wenbing (penalty missed)	0–3	(penalty scored) Moharrami; (penalty scored) Ansarifard; (penalty scored) Ghayeghran

Al-Ahly Stadium, Doha
Attendance: 1,500
Referee: Ahmad Bash (Jordan)

== Final ==
After a goalless draw in 90 minutes and extra time, a penalty shootout was required to determine the winner – the first time a shootout was needed to decide the final. Saudi Arabia defeated South Korea 4–3 on penalties to win the tournament.

18 December 1988
16:00

South Korea	0–0 (a.e.t.)	Saudi Arabia
Penalties
Cho Min-kook (penalty missed); Lee Tae-ho (penalty scored); Byun Byung-joo (penalty scored); Kim Joo-sung (penalty scored); Cho Yoon-hwan (penalty missed)	3–4	(penalty scored) Nu'eimeh; (penalty missed) Abd Al-Jawad; (penalty scored) Abdullah; (penalty scored) Al-Mutlaq; (penalty scored) Al-Bishi

Al-Ahli Stadium, Doha
Attendance: 20,000
Referee: Michel Vautrot (France)

== Goalscorers ==
There were 40 goals scored in 24 matches, for an average of 1.67 goals per match.

3 goals

- (South Korea) Lee Tae-ho

2 goals

- (China) Ma Lin
- (China) Xie Yuxin
- (Iran) Farshad Pious
- (South Korea) Byun Byung-joo
- (South Korea) Chung Hae-won
- (South Korea) Hwang Sun-hong
- (South Korea) Kim Joo-sung
- (Qatar) Adel Khamis
- (Qatar) Mansour Muftah
- (Qatar) Khalid Salman

1 goal

- (Bahrain) Fahad Mohamed
- (China) Gao Sheng
- (China) Mai Chao
- (China) Zhang Xiaowen
- (Iran) Karim Bavi
- (Kuwait) Adel Abbas
- (Kuwait) Mansour Basha
- (Saudi Arabia) Saleh Al-Mutlaq
- (Saudi Arabia) Mohamed Al-Suwaiyed
- (Saudi Arabia) Fahad Al-Bishi
- (Saudi Arabia) Yousuf Jazea'a
- (Saudi Arabia) Majed Abdullah
- (Syria) Walid Abu Al-Sel
- (Syria) Walid Al-Nasser
- (United Arab Emirates) Hassan Mohamed
- (United Arab Emirates) Abdulaziz Mohamed

1 own goal

- (United Arab Emirates) Muhsin Musabah (against Qatar)

== Awards ==
Most valuable player

- (South Korea) Kim Joo-sung

Top scorer

- (South Korea) Lee Tae-ho

Best goalkeeper

- (China) Zhang Huikang

Best forward

- (South Korea) Lee Tae-ho

Team of the tournament
Goalkeepers	Defenders	Midfielders	Forward
(China) Zhang Huikang; (Saudi Arabia) Abdullah Al-Deayea	(Saudi Arabia) Mohamed Al-Jawad; (Saudi Arabia) Saleh Nu'eimeh; (South Korea) Park Kyung-hoon; (South Korea) Chung Yong-hwan	(China) Xie Yuxin; (United Arab Emirates) Mohamed Salim; (Kuwait) Mahboub Juma'a; (Iran) Sirous Ghayeghran; (South Korea) Chung Hae-won; (Qatar) Adel Khamis; (Kuwait) Abdulaziz Al-Hajeri; (South Korea) Byun Byung-joo	(Saudi Arabia) Youssef Al-Thunayan; (Saudi Arabia) Majed Abdullah; (South Korea) Kim Joo-sung; (China) Wang Baoshan
