= Saleh Al-Nu'eimeh =

Saudi Arabian footballer

Saleh Nu'eimah
Personal information
- Full name: Saleh Mohammed Nu'eimah
- Date of birth: 1960 (age 65–66)
- Place of birth: Riyadh, Saudi Arabia
- Height: 1.82 m (5 ft 11 1/2 in)
- Position: Defender

Senior career*
Years	Team	Apps	(Gls)
1976–1990	Al-Hilal		

International career
1978–1989	Saudi Arabia	99	(2)
- * Club domestic league appearances and goals

Saleh Mohammed Nu'eimah (Arabic: صالح النعيمة) is a Saudi Arabian retired football player who played for Al Hilal Club and the Saudi national team.

== Career ==
Saleh Nu'eimah began his career on the morning of Sunday, 4 October 1976. He remained a reserve for a year and played his first game in 1977.

He scored his first goal in the return of its founder athletes Abdul Rahman bin Said. He was selected for the national team in 1979 in a record time for such selection.

He was a key player in the 1984 AFC Asian Cup held in Singapore and was named in the all-star team after the 1988 AFC Asian Cup.
