= Mohamed Abd Al-Jawad =

Saudi Arabian footballer

Personal information
- Full name: Mohamed Abed Abd Al-Jawad
- Date of birth: 28 November 1962 (age 63)
- Place of birth: Jeddah, Saudi Arabia
- Height: 1.65 m (5 ft 5 in)
- Position: Left back

Senior career*
Years	Team	Apps	(Gls)
1980–1995	Al-Ahli		

International career
1981–1994	Saudi Arabia	122	(7)
- * Club domestic league appearances and goals

Mohamed Abed Abd Al-Jawad (Arabic: مُحَمَّد عَابِد عَبْد الْجَوَاد, born 28 November 1962 in Jeddah) is a former Saudi Arabian football defender. He is nicknamed the flying wing. Mário Zagallo gave him his number 13 in Saudi national team while he was training Saudi National team, Abd Al-Jawad played with the Saudi national team from 1980 to 1994 and played for Al-Ahli from 1978 to 1995. Now works as an agent for football (soccer) players.

== Achievements ==
Al-Ahli

- Saudi Premier League : 1977–78, 1983–84
- King Cup : 1978, 1979, 1983
- Gulf Club Champions Cup : 1985
- Prince Faisal bin Fahd League : 1982

Saudi Arabia

- AFC Asian Cup:

Winner: 1984, 1988

== Personal life ==
After retirement, Abd Al-Jawad works as analyst and interviewer on TV. Aside from Arabic, he is fluent in English and Portuguese.

== See also ==
- List of men's footballers with 100 or more international caps
