= Football at the 1988 Summer Olympics – Group C =

== Table ==
Pos	Team	Pld	W	D	L	GF	GA	GD	Pts	Soviet Union national football team	Argentina national football team	South Korea national football team	United States men's national soccer team
1	Soviet Union	3	2	1	0	6	3	+3	5		2–1	0–0	4–2
2	Argentina	3	1	1	1	4	4	0	3	1–2		2–1	1–1
3	South Korea (H)	3	0	2	1	1	2	−1	2	0–0	1–2		0–0
4	United States	3	0	2	1	3	5	−2	2	2–4	1–1	0–0	

Source: FIFA
(H) Hosts

== Matches ==
=== South Korea vs Soviet Union ===
South Korea	0 — 0 (final score after 90 minutes)	Soviet Union
Manager: (South Korea) Kim Jung-Nam Team: 01 - GK - Cho Byung-Deuk; 02 - DF - Park Kyung-Hoon (yellow card) 57'; 04 - DF - Cho Min-Kook; 05 - DF - Jung Yong-Hwan; 17 - DF - Gu Sang-Bum; 03 - MF - Choi Kang-Hee; 08 - MF - Chung Hae-Won sub 24'; 16 - MF - Kim Joo-Sung; 19 - MF - Yeo Bum-Kyu sub 62'; 11 - FW - Byun Byung-Joo; 14 - FW - Choi Soon-Ho Substitutes: 10 - FW - Choi Sang-Kook on 24'; 18 - ? - Choi Yun-Gyeom on 62' Unused Substitutes: 20 - GK - Kim Pung-Joo ? ? Scorers: -	Half-time: 0-0 Competition: Olympic tournament (group stage) Date: Sunday; September 18, 1988 Kick off: 5 p.m. Venue: Busan Gudeok Stadium, Busan Attendance: 30000 Referee: Tullio Lanese ITA Assistants: Kenny Hope GBR; Chris Bambridge AUS Match rules: 90 minutes Five named substitutes Maximum of 2 substitutions	Manager: (Soviet Union) Anatoliy Byshovets Team: 01 - GK - Dmitry Kharin; 02 - DF - Gela Ketashvili; 04 - DF - Oleksiy Cherednyk; 17 - DF - Viktor Losev; 18 - DF - Sergei Gorlukovich; 08 - MF - Igor Ponomaryov; 10 - MF - Igor Dobrovolski; 15 - MF - Oleksiy Mykhaylychenko; 20 - MF - Arminas Narbekovas; 09 - FW - Aleksandr Borodyuk sub 46'; 19 - FW - Yury Savichev sub 58' Substitutes: 11 - FW - Volodymyr Lyuty on 46'; 14 - FW - Volodymyr Tatarchuk on 58' Unused Substitutes: 16 - GK - Alexei Prudnikov ? ? Scorers: -

=== United States vs Argentina ===
United States	1 — 1 (final score after 90 minutes)	Argentina
Manager: (United States) Lothar Osiander Team: 01 - GK - David Vanole; 04 - DF - Kevin Crow; 12 - DF - Paul Krumpe; 19 - DF - Brian Bliss (yellow card) 90'; 20 - DF - Paul Caligiuri; 08 - MF - Rick Davis (yellow card) 52'; 15 - MF - Tab Ramos sub 74'; 16 - MF - Bruce Murray; 17 - MF - Desmond Armstrong; 09 - FW - Brent Goulet sub 68'; 10 - FW - Peter Vermes Substitutes: 05 - DF - Mike Windischmann on 68'; 13 - MF - John Harkes on 74' Unused Substitutes: 18 - GK - Jeff Duback ? ? Scorers: 1-0 Mike Windischmann (78')	Half-time: 0-0 Competition: Olympic tournament (group stage) Date: Sunday; September 18, 1988 Kick off: 7 p.m. Venue: Daegu Civic Stadium, Daegu Attendance: 18500 Referee: Jamal Al Sharif SYR Assistants: Arnaldo Cézar Coelho BRA; Edgardo Codesal MEX Match rules: 90 minutes Five named substitutes Maximum of 2 substitutions	Manager: (Argentina) Carlos Pachamé Team: 01 - GK - Luis Islas; 02 - DF - Rubén Agüero; 08 - DF - Hernán Díaz; 09 - DF - Néstor Fabbri; 11 - DF - Néstor Lorenzo; 14 - DF - Carlos Mayor sub 54' (yellow card) 42'; 16 - MF - Hugo Pérez; 17 - MF - Alejandro Ruidiaz; 04 - FW - Carlos Alfaro; 07 - FW - Jorge Comas sub 81'; 19 - FW - Darío Siviski Substitutes: 13 - DF - Mario Lucca on 54' (yellow card) 77'; 15 - DF - Mauro Airez on 81' Unused Substitutes: 12 - GK - Fabián Cancelarich ? ? Scorers: 1-1 Carlos Alfaro (83', pen.)

=== South Korea vs United States ===
South Korea	0 — 0 (final score after 90 minutes)	United States
Manager: (South Korea) Kim Jung-Nam Team: 01 - GK - Cho Byung-Deuk; 02 - DF - Park Kyung-Hoon; 04 - DF - Cho Min-Kook; 05 - DF - Jung Yong-Hwan; 17 - DF - Gu Sang-Bum; 03 - MF - Choi Kang-Hee sub 25'; 16 - MF - Kim Joo-Sung (yellow card) 58'; 18 - MF - Choi Yun-Gyeom; 10 - FW - Choi Sang-Kook; 11 - FW - Byun Byung-Joo; 14 - FW - Choi Soon-Ho Substitutes: 06 - ? - Lee Tae-Ho on 25' sub 74'; 09 - ? - Kim Yong-Se on 74' Unused Substitutes: 20 - GK - Kim Pung-Joo ? ? Scorers: -	Half-time: 0-0 Competition: Olympic tournament (group stage) Date: Tuesday; September 20, 1988 Kick off: 5 p.m. Venue: Busan Gudeok Stadium, Busan Attendance: 22000 Referee: Baba Laouissi MAR Assistants: Lennox Sirjuesingh TRI; Tullio Lanese ITA Match rules: 90 minutes Five named substitutes Maximum of 2 substitutions	Manager: (United States) Lothar Osiander Team: 01 - GK - David Vanole; 04 - DF - Kevin Crow; 12 - DF - Paul Krumpe; 19 - DF - Brian Bliss; 20 - DF - Paul Caligiuri; 08 - MF - Rick Davis; 15 - MF - Tab Ramos sub 46'; 13 - MF - John Harkes sub 76'; 17 - MF - Desmond Armstrong; 09 - FW - Brent Goulet; 06 - FW - Frank Klopas Substitutes: 03 - DF - John Doyle on 46'; 14 - DF - John Stollmeyer on 76' Unused Substitutes: 18 - GK - Jeff Duback ? ? Scorers: -

=== Soviet Union vs Argentina ===
Soviet Union	2 — 1 (final score after 90 minutes)	Argentina
Manager: (Soviet Union) Anatoliy Byshovets Team: 01 - GK - Dmitry Kharin; 02 - DF - Gela Ketashvili; 04 - DF - Oleksiy Cherednyk (yellow card) 43'; 17 - DF - Viktor Losev; 18 - DF - Sergei Gorlukovich; 07 - MF - Yevgeni Kuznetsov; 10 - MF - Igor Dobrovolski (yellow card) 54'; 15 - MF - Oleksiy Mykhaylychenko (yellow card) 24'; 20 - MF - Arminas Narbekovas sub 61'; 11 - FW - Volodymyr Lyuty; 14 - FW - Volodymyr Tatarchuk sub 79' Substitutes: 19 - FW - Yury Savichev on 61'; 12 - DF - Yevgeny Yarovenko on 79' Unused Substitutes: 16 - GK - Alexei Prudnikov ? ? Scorers: 1-0 Igor Dobrovolski (7'); 2-0 Oleksiy Mykhaylychenko (22')	Half-time: 2-0 Competition: Olympic tournament (group stage) Date: Tuesday; September 20, 1988 Kick off: 7 p.m. Venue: Daegu Civic Stadium, Daegu Attendance: 25000 Referee: Gérard Biguet FRA Assistants: Kurt Röthlisberger SUI; Badara Sène SEN Match rules: 90 minutes Five named substitutes Maximum of 2 substitutions	Manager: (Argentina) Carlos Pachamé Team: 01 - GK - Luis Islas; 02 - DF - Rubén Agüero; 08 - DF - Hernán Díaz; 09 - DF - Néstor Fabbri; 11 - DF - Néstor Lorenzo; 13 - DF - Mario Lucca; 16 - MF - Hugo Pérez; 06 - MF - Claudio Cabrera sub 68'; 04 - FW - Carlos Alfaro; 07 - FW - Jorge Comas; 19 - FW - Darío Siviski Substitutes: 03 - FW - Mauro Airez on 68' Unused Substitutes: 12 - GK - Fabián Cancelarich ? ? ? Scorers: 2-1 Carlos Alfaro (77', pen.)

=== South Korea vs Argentina ===
South Korea	1 — 2 (final score after 90 minutes)	Argentina
Manager: (South Korea) Kim Jung-Nam Team: 01 - GK - Cho Byung-Deuk; 02 - DF - Park Kyung-Hoon; 04 - DF - Cho Min-Kook; 05 - DF - Jung Yong-Hwan; 17 - DF - Gu Sang-Bum (yellow card) 48'; 03 - MF - Choi Kang-Hee sub 81'; 16 - MF - Kim Joo-Sung; 07 - MF - Noh Soo-Jin sub 70'; 10 - FW - Choi Sang-Kook; 11 - FW - Byun Byung-Joo; 14 - FW - Choi Soon-Ho Substitutes: 19 - MF - Yeo Bum-Kyu on 70'; 09 - ? - Kim Yong-Se on 81' Unused Substitutes: 20 - GK - Kim Pung-Joo ? ? Scorers: 1-1 Noh Soo-Jin (14')	Half-time: 1-1 Competition: Olympic tournament (group stage) Date: Thursday; September 22, 1988 Kick off: 5 p.m. Venue: Busan Gudeok Stadium, Busan Attendance: 30000 Referee: Chris Bambridge AUS Assistants: Juan Daniel Cardellino URU; Kenny Hope GBR Match rules: 90 minutes Five named substitutes Maximum of 2 substitutions	Manager: (Argentina) Carlos Pachamé Team: 01 - GK - Luis Islas; 15 - DF - Pedro Monzón; 08 - DF - Hernán Díaz; 09 - DF - Néstor Fabbri; 11 - DF - Néstor Lorenzo sub 74'; 13 - DF - Mario Lucca; 16 - MF - Hugo Pérez sub 60'; 04 - FW - Carlos Alfaro; 07 - FW - Jorge Comas; 03 - FW - Mauro Airez; 19 - FW - Darío Siviski Substitutes: 18 - FW - Alejandro Russo on 60'; 06 - MF - Claudio Cabrera on 74' Unused Substitutes: 12 - GK - Fabián Cancelarich ? ? Scorers: 0-1 Carlos Alfaro (3'); 1-2 Néstor Fabbri (73')

=== Soviet Union vs United States ===
Soviet Union	4 — 2 (final score after 90 minutes)	United States
Manager: (Soviet Union) Anatoliy Byshovets Team: 01 - GK - Dmitry Kharin; 02 - DF - Gela Ketashvili; 12 - DF - Yevgeny Yarovenko; 17 - DF - Viktor Losev; 18 - DF - Sergei Gorlukovich; 07 - MF - Yevgeni Kuznetsov; 10 - MF - Igor Dobrovolski sub 54'; 15 - MF - Oleksiy Mykhaylychenko sub 59'; 20 - MF - Arminas Narbekovas; 11 - FW - Volodymyr Lyuty; 19 - FW - Yury Savichev Substitutes: 05 - DF - Arvydas Janonis on 54'; 09 - FW - Aleksandr Borodyuk on 59' Unused Substitutes: 16 - GK - Alexei Prudnikov ? ? Scorers: 1-0 Oleksiy Mykhaylychenko (7'); 2-0 Arminas Narbekovas (19'); 3-0 Igor Dobrovolski (45', pen.); 4-0 Oleksiy Mykhaylychenko (48')	Half-time: 3-0 Competition: Olympic tournament (group stage) Date: Thursday; September 22, 1988 Kick off: 5 p.m. Venue: Daegu Civic Stadium, Daegu Attendance: 20000 Referee: Arnaldo Cézar Coelho BRA Assistants: Edgardo Codesal MEX; Jamal Al Sharif SYR Match rules: 90 minutes Five named substitutes Maximum of 2 substitutions	Manager: (United States) Lothar Osiander Team: 01 - GK - David Vanole; 03 - DF - John Doyle; 04 - DF - Kevin Crow; 12 - DF - Paul Krumpe sub 65'; 14 - DF - John Stollmeyer sub 46'; 19 - DF - Brian Bliss; 20 - DF - Paul Caligiuri; 08 - MF - Rick Davis; 16 - MF - Bruce Murray; 10 - FW - Peter Vermes; 06 - FW - Frank Klopas Substitutes: 09 - FW - Brent Goulet on 46'; 17 - MF - Desmond Armstrong on 65' (yellow card) 69' Unused Substitutes: 18 - GK - Jeff Duback ? ? Scorers: 4-1 Brent Goulet (65'); 4-2 John Doyle (85')
