= Football at the 1988 Summer Olympics – Knockout stage =

== Bracket ==
Quarter-finals
September 25 - Daegu
Sweden	1
Italy (AET)	2
September 25 - Busan
Soviet Union	3
Australia	0
September 25 - Gwangju
Zambia	0
West Germany	4
September 25 - Seoul
Brazil	1
Argentina	0

Semi-finals
September 27 - Busan
Italy	2
Soviet Union (AET)	3
September 27 - Seoul
West Germany	1 (2)
Brazil	1 (3)

Gold medal match
October 1 - Seoul
Soviet Union (AET)	2
Brazil	1
Bronze-medal match
September 30 - Seoul
Italy	0
West Germany	3

== Matches ==
=== Zambia vs West Germany ===
Zambia	0 — 4 (final score after 90 minutes)	West Germany
Manager: (Zambia) Samuel Ndhlovu Team: 01 - GK - David Chabala; 14 - DF - Manfred Chabinga; 15 - DF - Ashols Melu; 04 - DF - Samuel Chomba; 03 - DF - Edmon Mumba; 07 - MF - Jonson Bwalya sub 54'; 06 - MF - Derby Makinka; 12 - MF - Kalusha Bwalya; 08 - MF - Charles Musonda; 19 - FW - Stone Nyirenda sub 54'; 18 - FW - Wisdom Mumba Chansa Substitutes: 11 - ? - Lucky Msiska on 54'; 17 - ? - Pearson Mwanza on 54' (yellow card) 67' Unused Substitutes: 16 - GK - Richard Mwanza ? ? Scorers: -	Half-time: 0-3 Competition: Olympic tournament (quarter-finals) Date: Sunday; September 25, 1988 Kick off: 5 p.m. Venue: Gwangju Mudeung Stadium, Gwangju Attendance: 8,000 Referee: Jesús Díaz COL Assistants: Jamal Al Sharif SYR; Jassim Mandi BHR Match rules: 90 minutes 30 minutes of extra-time if necessary Penalty shootout if scores still level Five named substitutes Maximum of 2 substitutions	Manager: (West Germany) Hannes Löhr Team: 12 - GK - Uwe Kamps; 05 - DF - Thomas Hörster; 02 - DF - Michael Schulz; 04 - DF - Wolfgang Funkel; 13 - DF - Roland Grahammer; 03 - MF - Armin Görtz; 14 - MF - Thomas Häßler sub 77'; 08 - MF - Holger Fach; 10 - MF - Wolfram Wuttke; 09 - FW - Jürgen Klinsmann; 19 - FW - Karl-Heinz Riedle sub 29' Substitutes: 18 - DF - Gerhard Kleppinger on 29'; 06 - MF - Olaf Janßen on 77' Unused Substitutes: 01 - GK - Oliver Reck ? ? Scorers: 0-1 Wolfgang Funkel (18', pen.); 0-2 Jürgen Klinsmann (34'); 0-3 Jürgen Klinsmann (43'); 0-4 Jürgen Klinsmann (89')

=== Soviet Union vs Australia ===
Soviet Union	3 — 0 (final score after 90 minutes)	Australia
Manager: (Soviet Union) Anatoliy Byshovets Team: 01 - GK - Dmitry Kharin; 02 - DF - Gela Ketashvili; 04 - DF - Oleksiy Cherednyk sub 72'; 17 - DF - Viktor Losev; 18 - DF - Sergei Gorlukovich; 07 - MF - Yevgeni Kuznetsov (yellow card) 82'; 10 - MF - Igor Dobrovolski; 15 - MF - Oleksiy Mykhaylychenko; 20 - MF - Arminas Narbekovas; 11 - FW - Volodymyr Lyuty; 14 - FW - Volodymyr Tatarchuk sub 68' Substitutes: 03 - DF - Igor Sklyarov on 68'; 13 - DF - Sergei Fokin on 72' Unused Substitutes: 16 - GK - Alexei Prudnikov ? ? Scorers: 1-0 Igor Dobrovolski (50', pen.); 1-0 Igor Dobrovolski (54', pen.); 3-0 Oleksiy Mykhaylychenko (62')	Half-time: 0-0 Competition: Olympic tournament (quarter-finals) Date: Sunday; September 25, 1988 Kick off: 5 p.m. Venue: Busan Gudeok Stadium, Busan Attendance: 7,000 Referee: Juan Daniel Cardellino URU Assistants: Vincent Mauro USA; Edgardo Codesal MEX Match rules: 90 minutes 30 minutes of extra-time if necessary Penalty shootout if scores still level Five named substitutes Maximum of 2 substitutions	Manager: (Australia) Frank Arok Team: 01 - GK - Jeffrey Olver; 02 - DF - Gary van Egmond; 03 - DF - Graham Jennings; 04 - DF - Charlie Yankos; 05 - DF - Robert Dunn (yellow card) 67'; 06 - MF - Paul Wade; 11 - MF - Oscar Crino; 12 - MF - Alan Davidson; 07 - MF - Frank Farina; 09 - FW - Graham Arnold; 18 - FW - David Mitchell (red card) 68' Substitutes: none Unused Substitutes: 08 - MF - Mike Petersen; 20 - GK - Michael Gibson ? ? ? Scorers: -

=== Sweden vs Italy ===
Sweden	1 — 2 (final score after 120 minutes)	Italy
Manager: (Sweden) Benny Lennartsson Team: 01 - GK - Sven Andersson; 05 - DF - Roland Nilsson; 03 - DF - Peter Lönn; 04 - DF - Göran Arnberg; 16 - DF - Roger Ljung; 06 - MF - Jonas Thern; 07 - MF - Leif Engqvist; 08 - MF - Michael Andersson; 09 - MF - Joakim Nilsson sub 73'; 10 - FW - Anders Limpar sub 23' (yellow card) 4'; 15 - FW - Jan Hellström Substitutes: 14 - FW - Hans Eskilsson on 23'; 13 - FW - Martin Dahlin on 73' Unused Substitutes: 17 - GK - Lars Eriksson ? ? Scorers: 1-1 Jan Hellström (84')	After 90 minutes: 1-1 Half-time: 0-0 Competition: Olympic tournament (quarter-finals) Date: Sunday; September 25, 1988 Kick off: 7 p.m. Venue: Daegu Civic Stadium, Daegu Attendance: 11,000 Referee: Gérard Biguet FRA Assistants: Michał Listkiewicz POL; Jean-Fidele Diramba GAB Match rules: 90 minutes 30 minutes of extra-time if necessary Penalty shootout if scores still level Five named substitutes Maximum of 2 substitutions	Manager: (Italy) Francesco Rocca Team: 01 - GK - Stefano Tacconi; 06 - DF - Mauro Tassotti; 09 - DF - Massimo Brambati (yellow card) 37'; 05 - DF - Ciro Ferrara; 04 - DF - Luigi De Agostini (yellow card) 45'; 11 - MF - Massimo Crippa; 16 - MF - Giuseppe Iachini; 18 - MF - Massimo Mauro; 19 - MF - Alberico Evani sub 73' (yellow card) 58'; 13 - FW - Pietro Paolo Virdis; 14 - FW - Ruggiero Rizzitelli sub 80' Substitutes: 07 - MF - Angelo Colombo on 73' (yellow card) 108'; 03 - FW - Andrea Carnevale on 80' Unused Substitutes: 20 - GK - Gianluca Pagliuca ? ? Scorers: 0-1 Pietro Paolo Virdis (50'); 1-2 Massimo Crippa (98')

=== Brazil vs Argentina ===
Brazil	1 — 0 (final score after 90 minutes)	Argentina
Manager: (Brazil) Carlos Alberto Silva Team: 01 - GK - Cláudio Taffarel; 02 - DF - Jorginho; 05 - DF - Ademir; 13 - DF - André Cruz; 14 - DF - Luiz Carlos Winck (yellow card) 25'; 15 - DF - Aloísio; 08 - MF - Geovani (yellow card) 83'; 16 - MF - Milton sub 65'; 19 - MF - Andrade; 20 - FW - Bebeto; 11 - FW - Romário Substitutes: 10 - FW - Careca on 65' Unused Substitutes: 12 - GK - Zé Carlos ? ? ? Scorers: 1-0 Geovani (76')	Half-time: 0-0 Competition: Olympic tournament (quarter-finals) Date: Sunday; September 25, 1988 Kick off: 7 p.m. Venue: Dongdaemun Stadium, Seoul Attendance: 21,800 Referee: Kurt Röthlisberger SUI Assistants: Keith Hackett ENG; Shizuo Takada JPN Match rules: 90 minutes 30 minutes of extra-time if necessary Penalty shootout if scores still level Five named substitutes Maximum of 2 substitutions	Manager: (Argentina) Carlos Pachamé Team: 01 - GK - Luis Islas; 08 - DF - Hernán Díaz; 09 - DF - Néstor Fabbri sub 65'; 11 - DF - Néstor Lorenzo; 13 - DF - Mario Lucca; 15 - DF - Pedro Monzón; 16 - MF - Hugo Pérez sub 80'; 04 - FW - Carlos Alfaro; 07 - FW - Jorge Comas; 03 - FW - Mauro Airez; 19 - FW - Darío Siviski Substitutes: 14 - DF - Carlos Mayor on 65'; 18 - FW - Alejandro Russo on 80' Unused Substitutes: 12 - GK - Fabián Cancelarich ? ? Scorers: -

=== Italy vs Soviet Union ===
Italy	2 — 3 (final score after 120 minutes)	Soviet Union
Manager: (Italy) Francesco Rocca Team: 01 - GK - Stefano Tacconi; 06 - DF - Mauro Tassotti; 09 - DF - Massimo Brambati; 05 - DF - Ciro Ferrara (yellow card) 94' (yellow-red card) 96'; 10 - DF - Stefano Carobbi; 11 - MF - Massimo Crippa; 16 - MF - Giuseppe Iachini (yellow card) 42'; 18 - MF - Massimo Mauro; 19 - MF - Alberico Evani sub 70'; 13 - FW - Pietro Paolo Virdis; 14 - FW - Ruggiero Rizzitelli sub 88' Substitutes: 17 - MF - Stefano Desideri on 70'; 03 - FW - Andrea Carnevale on 88' (yellow card) 108' Unused Substitutes: 20 - GK - Gianluca Pagliuca ? ? Scorers: 1-0 Pietro Paolo Virdis (50'); 2-3 Andrea Carnevale (118')	After 90 minutes: 1-1 Half-time: 0-0 Competition: Olympic tournament (semi-finals) Date: Tuesday; September 27, 1988 Kick off: 5 p.m. Venue: Busan Gudeok Stadium, Busan Attendance: 10,000 Referee: Jamal Al Sharif SYR Assistants: Gérard Biguet FRA; Michał Listkiewicz POL Match rules: 90 minutes 30 minutes of extra-time if necessary Penalty shootout if scores still level Five named substitutes Maximum of 2 substitutions	Manager: (Soviet Union) Anatoliy Byshovets Team: 01 - GK - Dmitry Kharin; 02 - DF - Gela Ketashvili (yellow card) 85'; 04 - DF - Oleksiy Cherednyk sub 46' (yellow card) 35'; 17 - DF - Viktor Losev; 18 - DF - Sergei Gorlukovich (yellow card) 53'; 07 - MF - Yevgeni Kuznetsov; 10 - MF - Igor Dobrovolski; 15 - MF - Oleksiy Mykhaylychenko; 20 - MF - Arminas Narbekovas; 11 - FW - Volodymyr Lyuty; 14 - FW - Volodymyr Tatarchuk sub 70' Substitutes: 12 - DF - Yevgeny Yarovenko on 46'; 19 - FW - Yury Savichev on 70' (yellow card) 102' Unused Substitutes: 16 - GK - Alexei Prudnikov ? ? Scorers: 1-1 Igor Dobrovolski (78'); 1-2 Arminas Narbekovas (92'); 1-3 Oleksiy Mykhaylychenko (106')

=== West Germany vs Brazil ===
West Germany	1 — 1 (final score after 120 minutes) (Penalty shootout 2 — 3)	Brazil
Manager: (West Germany) Hannes Löhr Team: 12 - GK - Uwe Kamps; 05 - DF - Thomas Hörster; 02 - DF - Michael Schulz; 04 - DF - Wolfgang Funkel; 13 - DF - Roland Grahammer; 03 - MF - Armin Görtz sub 96'; 14 - MF - Thomas Häßler; 08 - MF - Holger Fach; 10 - MF - Wolfram Wuttke (yellow card) 65'; 09 - FW - Jürgen Klinsmann; 11 - FW - Frank Mill sub 106' Substitutes: 18 - DF - Gerhard Kleppinger on 96'; 06 - MF - Olaf Janßen on 106' Unused Substitutes: 01 - GK - Oliver Reck ? ? Scorers: 1-0 Holger Fach (50')	After 90 minutes: 1-1 Half-time: 0-0 Competition: Olympic tournament (semi-finals) Date: Tuesday; September 27, 1988 Kick off: 8 p.m. Venue: Olympic Stadium, Seoul Attendance: 65,000 Referee: Keith Hackett ENG Assistants: Chris Bambridge AUS; Juan Carlos Loustau ARG Match rules: 90 minutes 30 minutes of extra-time if necessary Penalty shootout if scores still level Five named substitutes Maximum of 2 substitutions	Manager: (Brazil) Carlos Alberto Silva Team: 01 - GK - Cláudio Taffarel; 02 - DF - Jorginho; 05 - DF - Ademir sub 72' (yellow card) 67'; 13 - DF - André Cruz; 14 - DF - Luiz Carlos Winck; 15 - DF - Aloísio (yellow card) 118'; 08 - MF - Geovani (yellow card) 43'; 19 - MF - Andrade; 10 - FW - Careca; 20 - FW - Bebeto sub 62' (yellow card) 3'; 11 - FW - Romário Substitutes: 18 - FW - João Paulo on 62'; 16 - MF - Milton on 72' Unused Substitutes: 12 - GK - Zé Carlos ? ? Scorers: 1-1 Romário (79')

=== Italy vs West Germany ===
Italy	0 — 3 (final score after 90 minutes)	West Germany
Manager: (Italy) Francesco Rocca Team: 01 - GK - Stefano Tacconi; 06 - DF - Mauro Tassotti; 09 - DF - Massimo Brambati; 04 - DF - Luigi De Agostini; 10 - DF - Stefano Carobbi; 11 - MF - Massimo Crippa (yellow card) 87'; 07 - MF - Angelo Colombo; 15 - MF - Roberto Galia (yellow card) 60'; 18 - MF - Massimo Mauro; 03 - FW - Andrea Carnevale; 13 - FW - Pietro Paolo Virdis sub 58' Substitutes: 14 - FW - Ruggiero Rizzitelli on 58' Unused Substitutes: 20 - GK - Gianluca Pagliuca ? ? ? Scorers: -	Half-time: 0-2 Competition: Olympic tournament (bronze-medal match) Date: Friday; September 30, 1988 Kick off: 7 p.m. Venue: Olympic Stadium, Seoul Attendance: 61,000 Referee: Juan Carlos Loustau ARG Assistants: Kurt Röthlisberger SUI; Jean-Fidele Diramba GAB Match rules: 90 minutes 30 minutes of extra-time if necessary Penalty shootout if scores still level Five named substitutes Maximum of 2 substitutions	Manager: (West Germany) Hannes Löhr Team: 12 - GK - Uwe Kamps; 05 - DF - Thomas Hörster; 02 - DF - Michael Schulz (yellow card) 32'; 04 - DF - Wolfgang Funkel; 13 - DF - Roland Grahammer; 18 - DF - Gerhard Kleppinger; 14 - MF - Thomas Häßler; 17 - MF - Ralf Sievers sub 85'; 10 - MF - Wolfram Wuttke sub 61'; 09 - FW - Jürgen Klinsmann; 11 - FW - Frank Mill Substitutes: 15 - MF - Christian Schreier on 61'; 07 - MF - Rudi Bommer on 85' Unused Substitutes: 01 - GK - Oliver Reck ? ? Scorers: 0-1 Jürgen Klinsmann (5'); 0-2 Gerhard Kleppinger (18'); 0-3 Christian Schreier (68')

=== Soviet Union vs Brazil ===
Soviet Union	2 — 1 (final score after 120 minutes)	Brazil
Manager: (Soviet Union) Anatoliy Byshovets Team: 01 - GK - Dmitry Kharin; 02 - DF - Gela Ketashvili (yellow card) 42'; 12 - DF - Yevgeny Yarovenko; 17 - DF - Viktor Losev; 18 - DF - Sergei Gorlukovich (yellow card) 91'; 07 - MF - Yevgeni Kuznetsov; 10 - MF - Igor Dobrovolski; 15 - MF - Oleksiy Mykhaylychenko; 20 - MF - Arminas Narbekovas sub 46'; 11 - FW - Volodymyr Lyuty sub 115'; 14 - FW - Volodymyr Tatarchuk (yellow card) 78' (red card) 110' Substitutes: 19 - FW - Yury Savichev on 46'; 03 - DF - Igor Sklyarov on 115' Unused Substitutes: 16 - GK - Alexei Prudnikov ? ? Scorers: 1-1 Igor Dobrovolski (60', pen.); 2-1 Yury Savichev (103')	After 90 minutes: 1-1 Half-time: 0-1 Competition: Olympic tournament (gold-medal match) Date: Saturday; October 1, 1988 Kick off: 7 p.m. Venue: Olympic Stadium, Seoul Attendance: 74,000 Referee: Gérard Biguet FRA Assistants: Jesús Díaz COL; Jassim Mandi BHR Match rules: 90 minutes 30 minutes of extra-time if necessary Penalty shootout if scores still level Five named substitutes Maximum of 2 substitutions	Manager: (Brazil) Carlos Alberto Silva Team: 01 - GK - Cláudio Taffarel; 02 - DF - Jorginho; 13 - DF - André Cruz; 14 - DF - Luiz Carlos Winck (yellow card) 72'; 15 - DF - Aloísio (yellow card) 115'; 16 - MF - Milton; 17 - MF - Neto sub 73'; 19 - MF - Andrade; 10 - FW - Careca (yellow card) 42'; 20 - FW - Bebeto sub 75'; 11 - FW - Romário Substitutes: 09 - FW - Edmar on 73' (red card) 118'; 18 - FW - João Paulo on 75' Unused Substitutes: 12 - GK - Zé Carlos ? ? Scorers: 0-1 Romário (29')
