= South Korea national football team results (1980–1989) =

- Win Draw Loss

This is a list of football games played by the South Korea national football team between 1980 and 1989.

== Results by year ==
Year	Pld	W	D	L	Win %
1980	17	12	2	3	70.59
1981	12	7	2	3	58.33
1982	13	5	5	3	38.46
1983	15	8	5	2	53.33
1984	16	7	4	5	43.75
1985	15	11	0	4	73.33
1986	10	4	3	3	40.00
1987	5	3	2	0	60.00
1988	10	7	3	0	70.00
1989	16	11	3	2	68.75
Total	129	75	29	25	58.14

== Matches ==
=== 1980 ===
30 January Friendly	Saudi Arabia	1–3	South Korea	Riyadh, Saudi Arabia
	Abdullah 7'	Report	? 10'; ? 40'; ? 88'	Stadium: Prince Faisal bin Fahd Stadium; Attendance: 20,000

1 February Friendly	Saudi Arabia	0–0	South Korea	Khobar, Saudi Arabia
		Report		Stadium: Prince Saud bin Jalawi Stadium; Referee: Fahad Al Dahmash (Saudi Arabia)

26 February Friendly	South Korea	1–0	Mexico	Los Angeles, United States
	Kim Kang-nam 72'

22 March 1980 Summer Olympics (Qualification)	South Korea	3–1	Japan	Kuala Lumpur, Malaysia
	Huh Jung-moo 34' (pen.); Cho Kwang-rae 57', 79'		Takahara 89'

25 March 1980 Summer Olympics (Qualification)	Malaysia	3–0	South Korea	Kuala Lumpur, Malaysia
	Wong 7'; Khalid 32'; Choi Jong-duk 69' (o.g.)

27 March 1980 Summer Olympics (Qualification)	South Korea	8–0	Philippines	Kuala Lumpur, Malaysia
	Park Sang-in 13'; Chung Hae-won 16'; Shin Hyun-ho 22', 30', 64'; Gray 41' (o.g.); Kim Tae-hwan 50'; Huh Jung-moo 71'

31 March 1980 Summer Olympics (Qualification)	South Korea	3–0	Brunei	Kuala Lumpur, Malaysia
	Cho Kwang-rae 38'; Park Sang-in 40'; Chung Hae-won 83'

3 April 1980 Summer Olympics (Qualification)	South Korea	1–0	Indonesia	Kuala Lumpur, Malaysia
	Cho Kwang-rae 55'

6 April 1980 Summer Olympics (Qualification)	Malaysia	2–1	South Korea	Kuala Lumpur, Malaysia
	Bakri 12'; Wong 85'		Kim Kang-nam 58'

25 August 1980 Korea Cup	South Korea	3–0	Indonesia	Chuncheon, South Korea
	Choi Soon-ho 19'; Chung Hae-won 40'; Lee Kang-jo 83' (pen.)

2 September 1980 Korea Cup	South Korea	2–0	Indonesia	Seoul, South Korea
	Chung Hae-won 30'; Lee Kang-jo 89'

16 September 1980 AFC Asian Cup (Group B)	South Korea	1–1	Malaysia	Kuwait City, Kuwait
	Choi Soon-ho 68'		Zulkifli 90'

19 September 1980 AFC Asian Cup (Group B)	South Korea	2–0	Qatar	Kuwait City, Kuwait
	Lee Jung-il 4'; Choi Soon-ho 21'

21 September 1980 AFC Asian Cup (Group B)	Kuwait	0–3	South Korea	Kuwait City, Kuwait
			Hwang Seok-keun 47'; Choi Soon-ho 71', 78'

24 September 1980 AFC Asian Cup (Group B)	South Korea	4–1	United Arab Emirates	Kuwait City, Kuwait
	Choi Soon-ho 26', 53', 78' (pen.); Chung Hae-won 84'		Shombi 79'

28 September 1980 AFC Asian Cup (Semi-finals)	South Korea	2–1	North Korea	Kuwait City, Kuwait
	Chung Hae-won 80', 89'		Pak Jong-hun 19' (pen.)

30 September 1980 AFC Asian Cup (Final)	Kuwait	3–0	South Korea	Kuwait City, Kuwait
	Al-Houti 7'; Al-Dakhil 30', 67'

=== 1981 ===
10 February Friendly	Mexico	4–0	South Korea	Mexico City, Mexico
	Rodriguez 14'; Castro 23'; Lira 80'; Orduña 88'

8 March Japan–Korea Regular Match	Japan	0–1	South Korea	Tokyo, Japan
			Chung Hae-won 39'

21 April 1982 FIFA World Cup (Qualification)	South Korea	2–1	Malaysia	Kuwait City, Kuwait
	Hong Sung-ho 31'; Lee Kang-jo 82'		Wong 5'

24 April 1982 FIFA World Cup (Qualification)	South Korea	5–1	Thailand	Kuwait City, Kuwait
	Choi Soon-ho 23', 85'; Choi Jong-duk 33'; Oh Seok-jae 68'; Lee Tae-ho 70'		Pichai 35'

29 April 1982 FIFA World Cup (Qualification)	Kuwait	2–0	South Korea	Kuwait City, Kuwait
	Al-Anberi 50'; Al-Ghanim 80'

17 June 1981 Korea Cup	South Korea	2–0	Malaysia	Jeonju, South Korea
	Chung Hae-won 48', 51'

21 June 1981 Korea Cup	South Korea	2–0	Japan	Busan, South Korea
	Oh Seok-jae 43'; Lee Tae-yeop 77'

20 August 1981 Jakarta Anniversary Tournament	Indonesia	0–1	South Korea	Jakarta, Indonesia
			Hwang Seok-keun 9'

4 September 1981 Merdeka Tournament	South Korea	2–0	Singapore	Kuala Lumpur, Malaysia
	Hwang Seok-keun 20'; Byun Byung-joo 75'

13 September 1981 Merdeka Tournament	South Korea	1–1	Iraq	Kuala Lumpur, Malaysia
	Byun Byung-joo 40'		Aziz 60'

16 September 1981 Merdeka Tournament	South Korea	1–1	Thailand	Kuala Lumpur, Malaysia
	Hwang Seok-keun 58'		Chalor 25'

17 October Friendly	Saudi Arabia	2–0	South Korea	Riyadh, Saudi Arabia
	Al-Musaibeah 18'; Abdullah 87'	Report		Stadium: Prince Faisal bin Fahd Stadium; Referee: Fallaj Al Shanar (Saudi Arabia)

=== 1982 ===
18 February 1982 Nehru Cup	India	2–2	South Korea	Calcutta, India
	Banerjee 41'; Bhattacharya 89' (pen.)		Hwang Seok-keun 64'; Chung Jong-soo 86'

20 February 1982 Nehru Cup	South Korea	2–2	Uruguay	Calcutta, India
	Chung Hae-won 3'; Chang Woe-ryong 15'		Ramos 48' (pen.); Nadal 65'

1 March 1982 Nehru Cup	South Korea	1–1	China	Calcutta, India
	Lee Tae-ho 44'		Shen Xiangfu 80'

7 March Friendly	Iraq	3–0	South Korea	Baghdad, Iraq

10 March Friendly	Iraq	1–1	South Korea	Baghdad, Iraq
			Lee Tae-ho (?)

21 March Japan–Korea Regular Match	South Korea	3–0	Japan	Seoul, South Korea
	Kang Shin-woo 2'; Choi Soon-ho 38'; Lee Kang-jo 52'

9 May 1982 King's Cup	Thailand	0–3	South Korea	Bangkok, Thailand
			Hwang Seok-keun 17'; Chung Hae-won 37'; Lee Tae-ho 67' (pen.)

17 May 1982 King's Cup	Thailand	0–0 (a.e.t.) (4–3 p)	South Korea	Bangkok, Thailand
	Penalties
	Piyapong (penalty scored); Saghapool (penalty scored); Apinan (penalty scored); Prapan (penalty scored); Sutin (penalty missed); Visoot (penalty missed)		(penalty scored) Chang Woe-ryong; (penalty scored) Park Kyung-hoon; (penalty scored) Lee Tae-ho; (penalty missed) Lee Kang-jo; (penalty missed) Chung Hae-won; (penalty missed) Choi Soon-ho

9 June 1982 Korea Cup	South Korea	1–0	India	Busan, South Korea
	Bhattacharya 65' (o.g.)			Stadium: Busan Gudeok Stadium

11 June 1982 Korea Cup	South Korea	3–0	Bahrain	Gwangju, South Korea
	Lee Tae-ho 27', 52' (pen.); Choi Soon-ho 54'			Stadium: Gwangju Mudeung Stadium

21 November 1982 Asian Games (Group D)	South Korea	3–0	South Yemen	New Delhi, India
	Chung Hae-won 25'; Choi Soon-ho 75', 80'

23 November 1982 Asian Games (Group D)	South Korea	0–1	Iran	New Delhi, India
			Derakhshan 47'

25 November 1982 Asian Games (Group D)	South Korea	1–2	Japan	New Delhi, India
	Kang Shin-woo 21'		Kimura 58'; Kaneda 79'

=== 1983 ===
6 March Japan–Korea Regular Match	Japan	1–1	South Korea	Tokyo, Japan
	Tanaka 6'		Kim Gyeong-ho 90'

6 June 1983 Korea Cup	South Korea	4–0	Thailand	Suwon, South Korea
	Lee Sang-yong 4'; No In-ho 40', 89'; Lee Tae-ho 79'

8 June 1983 Korea Cup	South Korea	1–0	Nigeria	Seoul, South Korea
	No In-ho 15'

10 June 1983 Korea Cup	South Korea	2–0	United States	Busan, South Korea
	Cho Min-kook 29' (pen.), 40'

12 June 1983 Korea Cup	South Korea	3–0	Indonesia	Jeonju, South Korea
	Lee Sang-yong 19', 54'; Ahn Byung-tae 58'

15 June 1983 Korea Cup	South Korea	1–0	Ghana	Seoul, South Korea
	Lee Tae-ho 82'

28 July Friendly	South Korea	1–1 (a.e.t.) (3–5 p)	Guatemala	Los Angeles, United States
	? (?)		Alburez 39'

3 August Friendly	Guatemala	2–1	South Korea	Guatemala City, Guatemala
	M. Mendez 10'; Fernandez 58'		Lee Kil-yong 32'

9 August Friendly	Costa Rica	1–1	South Korea	San José, Costa Rica
	Ledezma 7' (pen.)		Byun Byung-joo 22'

1 November 1984 Summer Olympics (Qualification)	Thailand	2–1	South Korea	Bangkok, Thailand
	Vorawan 65'; Piyapong 71'		Shin Yon-ho 40'

3 November 1984 Summer Olympics (Qualification)	South Korea	3–3	China	Bangkok, Thailand
	Kim Jong-geon 32', 50'; Kim Jong-boo 34'		Jia Xiuquan 51'; Liu Haiguang 79', 85'

5 November 1984 Summer Olympics (Qualification)	South Korea	4–0	Hong Kong	Bangkok, Thailand
	Kim Jong-boo 58', 72', 85'; Shin Yon-ho 68' (pen.)

8 November 1984 Summer Olympics (Qualification)	South Korea	0–0	China	Bangkok, Thailand

10 November 1984 Summer Olympics (Qualification)	South Korea	2–0	Hong Kong	Bangkok, Thailand
	Shin Yon-ho 35'; Kim Jong-boo 60'

12 November 1984 Summer Olympics (Qualification)	Thailand	0–2	South Korea	Bangkok, Thailand
			Shin Yon-ho 44', 83'

=== 1984 ===
17 April 1984 Summer Olympics (Qualification)	South Korea	0–0	Kuwait	Singapore

19 April 1984 Summer Olympics (Qualification)	South Korea	1–0	Bahrain	Singapore
	Choi Soon-ho 43'

22 April 1984 Summer Olympics (Qualification)	South Korea	2–0	New Zealand	Singapore
	Chung Yong-hwan 65'; Choi Soon-ho 70'

24 April 1984 Summer Olympics (Qualification)	South Korea	4–5	Saudi Arabia	Singapore
	Chung Jong-son 14'; Chung Hae-won 20'; Al-Bishi 49' (o.g.); Lee Kil-yong 73'		Al-Nafisah 41'; M. Al-Dosari 47'; Abdullah 57', 65'; S. Al-Dosari 82'

29 April 1984 Summer Olympics (Qualification)	South Korea	0–1	Iraq	Singapore
			Dirjal 43'

3 June 1984 Korea Cup	South Korea	2–0	Guatemala	Busan, South Korea
	Lee Tae-ho 58'; Lee Tae-hyeong 62'

30 September Japan–Korea Regular Match	South Korea	1–2	Japan	Seoul, South Korea
	Lee Gyeong-nam 42'		Kimura 36'; Mizunuma 50'

4 October Friendly	South Korea	5–0	Cameroon	Seoul, South Korea
	Park Chang-sun 16'; Byun Byung-joo 44'; Choi Sang-kook 46', 70', 80'

10 October 1984 AFC Asian Cup (Qualification)	South Korea	6–0	North Yemen	Kolkata, India
	Park Sung-hwa 1', 2', 3', 46'; Chung Hae-won 47', 48'

13 October 1984 AFC Asian Cup (Qualification)	South Korea	6–0	Pakistan	Kolkata, India
	Lee Tae-ho 10'; Choi Sang-kook 15'; Park Sung-hwa 46', 47'; (?); (?)

16 October 1984 AFC Asian Cup (Qualification)	South Korea	0–0	Malaysia	Kolkata, India

19 October 1984 AFC Asian Cup (Qualification)	India	0–1	South Korea	Kolkata, India
			Park Chang-sun 75'

2 December 1984 AFC Asian Cup (Group A)	South Korea	1–1	Saudi Arabia	Singapore
	Lee Tae-ho 51'		Abdullah 90'	Stadium: National Stadium; Attendance: 24,340; Referee: George Joseph (Malaysia)

5 December 1984 AFC Asian Cup (Group A)	South Korea	0–0	Kuwait	Singapore

7 December 1984 AFC Asian Cup (Group A)	South Korea	0–1	Syria	Singapore
			Hassan 13'

10 December 1984 AFC Asian Cup (Group A)	South Korea	0–1	Qatar	Singapore
			Salman 69'

=== 1985 ===
2 March 1986 FIFA World Cup (Qualification)	Nepal	0–2	South Korea	Kathmandu, Nepal
			Pradhan 35' (o.g.); Lee Tae-ho 63' (pen.)

10 March 1986 FIFA World Cup (Qualification)	Malaysia	1–0	South Korea	Kuala Lumpur, Malaysia
	Dollah 7'

6 April 1986 FIFA World Cup (Qualification)	South Korea	4–0	Nepal	Seoul, South Korea
	Huh Jung-moo 18', 57'; Kim Seok-won 36'; Chung Jong-soo 41'

19 May 1986 FIFA World Cup (Qualification)	South Korea	2–0	Malaysia	Seoul, South Korea
	Park Chang-sun 12' (pen.); Cho Min-kook 18'

6 June 1985 Korea Cup	South Korea	3–2	Thailand	Daejeon, South Korea
	Choi Soon-ho 2'; Park Chang-sun 48' (pen.); Lee Tae-ho 75'		Somchai 7'; Witthaya 88'

8 June 1985 Korea Cup	South Korea	3–0	Bahrain	Gwangju, South Korea
	Choi Soon-ho 6', 55'; Lee Tae-ho 88'

15 June 1985 Korea Cup	South Korea	2–0	Iraq	Seoul, South Korea
	Choi Soon-ho 2', 87'

21 July 1986 FIFA World Cup (Qualification)	South Korea	2–0	Indonesia	Seoul, South Korea
	Byun Byung-joo 74'; Kim Joo-sung 82'

30 July 1986 FIFA World Cup (Qualification)	Indonesia	1–4	South Korea	Jakarta, Indonesia
	Sulaiman 87'		Byun Byung-joo 7'; Choi Soon-ho 9'; Huh Jung-moo 32'; Kim Joo-sung 47'

26 October 1986 FIFA World Cup (Qualification)	Japan	1–2	South Korea	Tokyo, Japan
	Kimura 43'		Chung Yong-hwan 30'; Lee Tae-ho 42'

3 November 1986 FIFA World Cup (Qualification)	South Korea	1–0	Japan	Seoul, South Korea
	Huh Jung-moo 61'

3 December Friendly	South Korea	1–2	Mexico	Los Angeles, United States
	Kim Joo-sung 13'		Flores 15', 56'

8 December Mexico Tournament	South Korea	0–1	Hungary	Irapuato, Mexico
			Kiprich 54' (pen.)

10 December Mexico Tournament	Mexico	2–1	South Korea	Guadalajara, Mexico
	Boy 43'; Hermosillo 85'		Kim Jong-boo 23'

14 December Mexico Tournament	South Korea	2–0	Algeria	Nezahualcóyotl, Mexico
	Kim Jong-boo 56'; Choi Soon-ho 89'

=== 1986 ===
16 February 1986 Lunar New Year Cup	South Korea	1–3	Paraguay	Hong Kong
	Cho Min-kook 77'		Cañete 46'; Sandoval 66'; Schettina 89'

2 June 1986 FIFA World Cup (Group A)	South Korea	1–3	Argentina	Mexico City, Mexico
	Park Chang-sun 83'		Valdano 6', 46'; Ruggeri 18'

5 June 1986 FIFA World Cup (Group A)	South Korea	1–1	Bulgaria	Mexico City, Mexico
	Kim Jong-boo 71'		Getov 11'

11 June 1986 FIFA World Cup (Group A)	South Korea	2–3	Italy	Puebla, Mexico
	Choi Soon-ho 62'; Huh Jung-moo 89'		Altobelli 17', 73'; Cho Kwang-rae 82' (o.g.)

20 September 1986 Asian Games (Group B)	South Korea	3–0	India	Busan, South Korea
	Noh Soo-jin 9'; Choi Soon-ho 32'; Park Chang-sun 83' (pen.)

24 September 1986 Asian Games (Group B)	South Korea	0–0	Bahrain	Busan, South Korea

28 September 1986 Asian Games (Group B)	South Korea	4–2	China	Busan, South Korea
	Park Chang-sun 19' (pen.); Kim Joo-sung 47'; Lee Tae-ho 74'; Cho Min-kook 76'		Li Hui 25' (pen.), 79' (pen.)

1 October 1986 Asian Games (Quarter-finals)	South Korea	1–1 (a.e.t.) (5–4 p)	Iran	Busan, South Korea
	Park Chang-sun 34' (pen.)		Bavi 84'

3 October 1986 Asian Games (Semi-finals)	South Korea	4–0	Indonesia	Seoul, South Korea
	Cho Kwang-rae 28'; Choi Soon-ho 51', 74'; Lee Tae-ho 67'

5 October 1986 Asian Games (Final)	South Korea	2–0	Saudi Arabia	Seoul, South Korea
	Cho Kwang-rae 7'; Byun Byung-joo 84'	Report		Stadium: Olympic Stadium; Attendance: 70,000

=== 1987 ===
10 June 1987 Korea Cup	South Korea	0–0	Egypt	Masan, South Korea

12 June 1987 Korea Cup	South Korea	1–0	United States	Busan, South Korea
	Choi Sang-kook 31'

14 June 1987 Korea Cup	South Korea	4–2	Thailand	Daejeon, South Korea
	Noh Soo-jin 14'; Kim Joo-sung 18'; Chung Hae-won 64'; Kim Sam-soo 79' (pen.)		Thanis 63'; Wirapong 88'

21 June 1987 Korea Cup	South Korea	1–1 (a.e.t.) (5–4 p)	Australia	Seoul, South Korea
	Kim Pan-keun 72'		Arnold 83'
	Penalties
	Chung Hae-won (penalty scored); Choi Soon-ho (penalty missed); Kim Pan-keun (penalty scored); Kim Sam-soo (penalty scored); Kim Joo-sung (penalty scored); Yeo Bum-kyu (penalty scored)		(penalty scored) Crino; (penalty scored) Yankos; (penalty scored) Davidson; (penalty missed) Farina; (penalty scored) Dunn; (penalty missed) Raskopoulos

17 December 1987 Merdeka Tournament	Malaysia	0–1	South Korea	Kuala Lumpur, Malaysia
			Choi Sang-kook 80'

=== 1988 ===
6 January 1987 Afro-Asian Cup of Nations	South Korea	1–1 (a.e.t.) (4–3 p)	Egypt	Doha, Qatar
	Lee Tae-ho 65'		Younes 86'
	Penalties
	Chung Hae-won (penalty scored); Noh Soo-jin (penalty scored); Byun Byung-joo (penalty scored); Kim Sam-soo (penalty scored)		(penalty scored) Soliman; (penalty scored) Shehata; (penalty missed) Ramadan; (penalty scored) Shobair; (penalty missed) Younes

19 June 1988 Korea Cup	South Korea	4–0	Zambia	Suwon, South Korea
	Byun Byung-joo 3'; Choi Soon-ho 53'; Chung Hae-won 77', 86'

18 September 1988 Summer Olympics (Group C)	South Korea	0–0 (Note: Not recognised as international "A" match.)	Soviet Union Olympic	Busan, South Korea
				Stadium: Busan Gudeok Stadium

20 September 1988 Summer Olympics (Group C)	South Korea	0–0	United States	Busan, South Korea
				Stadium: Busan Gudeok Stadium

22 September 1988 Summer Olympics (Group C)	South Korea	1–2	Argentina Olympic	Busan, South Korea
	Noh Soo-jin 14'		Alfaro Moreno 3'; Fabbri 73'	Stadium: Busan Gudeok Stadium

26 October Japan–Korea Regular Match	Japan	0–1	South Korea	Tokyo, Japan
			Choi Soon-ho 43'

3 December 1988 AFC Asian Cup (Group A)	South Korea	1–0	United Arab Emirates	Doha, Qatar
15:00	Lee Tae-ho 8' (pen.)	Report		Stadium: Al-Ahly Stadium; Referee: George Courtney (England)

6 December 1988 AFC Asian Cup (Group A)	South Korea	2–0	Japan	Doha, Qatar
15:00	Hwang Sun-hong 13'; Kim Joo-sung 35'	Report		Stadium: Qatar SC Stadium; Referee: Salah Mohammed (Iraq)

9 December 1988 AFC Asian Cup (Group A)	Qatar	2–3	South Korea	Doha, Qatar
17:00	Salman 47' (pen.), 80' (pen.)	Report	Chung Hae-won 10', 72'; Kim Joo-sung 34'	Stadium: Qatar SC Stadium; Referee: George Courtney (England)

11 December 1988 AFC Asian Cup (Group A)	South Korea	3–0	Iran	Doha, Qatar
17:00	Byun Byung-joo 26', 57'; Hwang Sun-hong 42'	Report		Stadium: Al-Ahly Stadium; Attendance: 5,000; Referee: Neji Jouini (Tunisia)

14 December 1988 AFC Asian Cup (Semi-finals)	South Korea	2–1 (a.e.t.)	China	Doha, Qatar
16:00	Lee Tae-ho 93', 103'	Report	Mai Chao 100'	Stadium: Qatar SC Stadium; Attendance: 1,000; Referee: Vincent Mauro (United States)

18 December 1988 AFC Asian Cup (Final)	South Korea	0–0 (a.e.t.) (3–4 p)	Saudi Arabia	Doha, Qatar
16:00		Report		Stadium: Al-Ahly Stadium; Attendance: 20,000; Referee: Michel Vautrot (France)
	Penalties
	Cho Min-kook (penalty missed); Lee Tae-ho (penalty scored); Byun Byung-joo (penalty scored); Kim Joo-sung (penalty scored); Cho Yoon-hwan (penalty missed)		(penalty scored) Al-Naima; (penalty missed) Al-Jawad; (penalty scored) Abdullah; (penalty scored) Al-Mutlaq; (penalty scored) Al-Bishi

=== 1989 ===
5 May Japan–Korea Regular Match	South Korea	1–0	Japan	Seoul, South Korea
	Lee Tae-ho 63'

23 May 1990 FIFA World Cup (Qualification)	South Korea	3–0	Singapore	Seoul, South Korea
	Hwang Sun-hong 7', 20'; Chung Hae-won 89'

25 May 1990 FIFA World Cup (Qualification)	South Korea	9–0	Nepal	Seoul, South Korea
	Chung Yong-hwan 1'; Lee Tae-ho 16' (pen.); Choi Sang-kook 24', 48'; Kim Yong-se 29', 83'; Lee Young-jin 38'; Noh Soo-jin 46'; Cho Min-kook 87'

27 May 1990 FIFA World Cup (Qualification)	South Korea	3–0	Malaysia	Seoul, South Korea
	Choi Soon-ho 5'; Hwang Sun-hong 56', 79'

3 June 1990 FIFA World Cup (Qualification)	South Korea	4–0	Nepal	Singapore
	Lee Hak-jong 31'; Park Kyung-hoon 41'; Kim Yong-se 43'; Lee Tae-ho 84'

5 June 1990 FIFA World Cup (Qualification)	South Korea	3–0	Malaysia	Singapore
	Hwang Sun-hong 66'; Cho Min-kook 83'; Hwangbo Kwan 87'

7 June 1990 FIFA World Cup (Qualification)	Singapore	0–3	South Korea	Singapore
			Kim Yong-se 8'; Noh Soo-jin 61', 69'

26 June 1989 Korea Cup	South Korea	0–0	Czechoslovakia	Seoul, South Korea

10 August Marlboro Cup	South Korea	2–4	Mexico	Los Angeles, United States
	Hwangbo Kwan 47', 52'		Peláez 12', 36', 46', 57'

13 August Marlboro Cup	United States	1–2	South Korea	Los Angeles, United States
	Harkes 63'		Banks 17' (o.g.); Hwang Sun-hong 21'

16 September Friendly	South Korea	0–1	Egypt	Seoul, South Korea
			Hassan 7'

13 October 1990 FIFA World Cup (Qualification)	South Korea	0–0	Qatar	Singapore

16 October 1990 FIFA World Cup (Qualification)	South Korea	1–0	North Korea	Singapore
	Hwang Sun-hong 18'

20 October 1990 FIFA World Cup (Qualification)	South Korea	1–0	China	Singapore
	Kim Joo-sung 66'

25 October 1990 FIFA World Cup (Qualification)	South Korea	2–0	Saudi Arabia	Singapore
	Hwangbo Kwan 41'; Hwang Sun-hong 89'			Stadium: National Stadium; Attendance: 11,288; Referee: Carlos Espósito (Argentina)

28 October 1990 FIFA World Cup (Qualification)	South Korea	1–1	United Arab Emirates	Singapore
	Hwangbo Kwan 7'		Al Talyani 16'

== See also ==
- South Korea national football team results
- South Korea national football team
