= 1989 Ilhwa Chunma season =

Ilhwa Chunma
1989 season
- Chairman: Park Kyu-Nam
- Manager: Park Jong-Hwan
- KPFL: 5th
- Top goalscorer: Baek Jong-Chul (9 goals)
- Highest home attendance: 20,000
- Lowest home attendance: 1,000

On 1 November 1988, Tongil Sports Co., Ltd. announced the organization of Ilhwa Chunma Football Club and chose Dongdaemun Stadium in Seoul as its home stadium. Then on 18 March 1989, 108 days after the announcement, the organizing ceremony was held at the Sheraton Walkerhill Hotel in Seoul. Ilhwa Chunma participated in its first season as the 6th professional football team of Korean Professional Football League.

== Staff ==
=== Coaching staff ===
- Manager : (South Korea) Park Jong-Hwan
- Coach : (South Korea) Won Hong-Jae
- Trainer : (South Korea) Lee Jang-Soo
- Team Physician : (South Korea) Lee Sang-Don

== Squad ==
Note: Flags indicate national team as defined under FIFA eligibility rules; some limited exceptions apply. Players may hold more than one non-FIFA nationality.

Pos.	Nation	Player
GK	KOR	Kim Young-Ho
GK	KOR	Na Chi-Seon
GK	KOR	Ahn Hyo-Chul
DF	KOR	Lim Jong-Heon
DF	KOR	Kim Hyun-Seok
DF	KOR	Choi Chung-Il
DF	KOR	Kim Young-Joo
DF	KOR	Jang Chang-Soon
DF	KOR	Park Jong-Dae
DF	KOR	Yoo Seung-Gwan
DF	KOR	Ko Jeong-Woon
DF	KOR	Park Sang-Rok
DF	KOR	Kim Kyung-Bum
DF	KOR	Moon Won-Geun
MF	KOR	Baek Jong-Chul

Pos.	Nation	Player
MF	KOR	Ha Sung-Jun
MF	KOR	Kim Yong-Se
MF	KOR	Kim I-Ju
MF	KOR	Nam Ho-Sang
MF	KOR	Oh Dong-Cheon
MF	KOR	Bang In-Woong
MF	KOR	Ahn Ik-Soo
MF	KOR	Jung Pyeong-Ryeol
FW	KOR	Min Byung-Eun
FW	KOR	Han Yeon-Su
FW	KOR	Jang Jeong
FW	KOR	Kim Ki-Wan
FW	KOR	Park Doo-Heung
FW	KOR	Son Woong-Jung
FW	KOR	Kim Jae-So

== Season results ==
=== KPFL table ===
Pos	Team	Pld	W	D	L	GF	GA	GD	Pts	Qualification
2	Lucky-Goldstar Hwangso	40	15	17	8	53	40	+13	47	
3	Daewoo Royals	40	14	14	12	44	44	0	42	Qualification for the Cup Winners' Cup (Note: Qualified as champions of the Korean National Football Championship.)
4	POSCO Atoms	40	13	14	13	49	50	−1	40	
5	Ilhwa Chunma	40	6	21	13	44	52	−8	33	
6	Hyundai Horang-i	40	7	15	18	34	49	−15	29	

Source: RSSSF

=== Personal awards ===
Rookie of the Year Award: Ko Jeong-Woon
Best XI: Lim Jong-Heon

== Matches ==
26 March 1989 KPFL	Lucky-Goldstar Hwangso	2–2	Ilhwa Chunma	Jeonju Stadium, Jeonju
	Kim Sam-Su 48', Cho Min-Kook 67'		Kim Yong-Se 43' 55'	Attendance: 20,000; Referee: Sim Geon-Taek

1 April 1989 KPFL	Lucky-Goldstar Hwangso	0–1	Ilhwa Chunma	Cheongju Stadium, Cheongju
			Son Woong-Jung 01'	Attendance: 15,000; Referee: Han Woon-Jib

9 April 1989 KPFL	Hyundai Horang-i	2–1	Ilhwa Chunma	Chuncheon Civil Stadium, Chuncheon
	Kang Jae-Soon 55', Lee Hak-Jong 68'		Kim I-Ju 71'	Attendance: 14,000; Referee: Choi Kil-Soo

15 April 1989 KPFL	Hyundai Horang-i	0–0	Ilhwa Chunma	Gangneung Stadium, Gangneung
				Attendance: 10,000; Referee: Park Hwa-Deok

23 April 1989 KPFL	POSCO Atoms	1–3	Ilhwa Chunma	Steelyard Stadium, Pohang
	Choi Sang-Kuk 69'		Park Jong-Dae 17', Kim I-Ju 24', Baek Jong-Chul 44'	Attendance: 20,000; Referee: Lee Do-Ha

29 April 1989 KPFL	Ilhwa Chunma	1–3	POSCO Atoms	Dongdaemun Stadium, Seoul
	Kim I-Ju 21'		Lee Hwa-Yeol 04' 38', Kim Jong-Boo 12'	Attendance: 20,000; Referee: Choi Kil-Soo

6 May 1989 KPFL	Daewoo Royals	1–0	Ilhwa Chunma	Busan Gudeok Stadium, Busan
	Byun Byung-Joo 28'			Attendance: 10,000; Referee: Sim Geon-Taek

9 May 1989 KPFL	Ilhwa Chunma	3–3	Daewoo Royals	Dongdaemun Stadium, Seoul
	Baek Jong-Chul 23', Son Woong-Jung 34', Choi Chung-Il 54'		Byun Byung-Joo 50', Son Hyung-Sun 59', Noh Kyung-Hwan 81'	Attendance: 8,000; Referee: Park Hee-Cha-Rang

13 May 1989 KPFL	Ilhwa Chunma	0–1	Yukong Elephants	Dongdaemun Stadium, Seoul
			Cha Seok-Jun 40'	Attendance: 9,000; Referee: Lee Do-Ha

20 May 1989 KPFL	Yukong Elephants	1–1	Ilhwa Chunma	Moodeung Stadium, Gwangju
	Moon Young-Rae 78'		Kim Kyung-Bum 04'	Attendance: 4,600; Referee: Park Kyung-In

28 May 1989 KPFL	Ilhwa Chunma	3–3	Daewoo Royals	Dongdaemun Stadium, Seoul
	Park Doo-Heung 14', Baek Jong-Chul 24', Ha Sung-Jun 52'		Kim Pan-Geun 26', Byun Byung-Joo 50' 59'	Attendance: 7,000; Referee: Kil Ki-Chul

2 June 1989 KPFL	Daewoo Royals	2–1	Ilhwa Chunma	Busan Gudeok Stadium, Busan
	Lee Tae-Hyung1 10', Yeo Bum-Kyu 72'		Baek Jong-Chul 55'	Attendance: 10,000; Referee: Sim Geon-Taek

6 June 1989 KPFL	Ilhwa Chunma	2–2	Lucky-Goldstar Hwangso	Dongdaemun, Seoul
	Baek Jong-Chul 41', Kim Young-Joo 59'		Choi Jin-Han 37', Cha Kwang-Sik 73'	Attendance: 7,000; Referee: Park Kyung-Hwa

10 June 1989 KPFL	Lucky-Goldstar Hwangso	1–1	Ilhwa Chunma	Jeonju Stadium, Jeonju
	Choi Tae-Jin 59'		Baek Jong-Chul 28'	Attendance: 15,000; Referee: Kim In-Soo

1 July 1989 KPFL	Ilhwa Chunma	4–1	POSCO Atoms	Dongdaemun Stadium, Seoul
	Kim Yong-Se 20' 22', Baek Jong-Chul 57', Kim Young-Joo 74'		Cho Keung-Yeon 53'	Attendance: 5,000; Referee: Choi Kil-Soo

8 July 1989 KPFL	POSCO Atoms	1–1	Ilhwa Chunma	Steelyard Stadium, Pohang
	Cho Keung-Yeon 19'		Kim Yong-Se 89'	Attendance: 8,000; Referee: Sim Geon-Taek

12 July 1989 KPFL	Ilhwa Chunma	0–0	Hyundai Horang-i	Dongdaemun Stadium, Seoul
				Attendance: 3,000; Referee: Kim In-Soo

19 July 1989 KPFL	Yukong Elephants	2–2	Ilhwa Chunma	Olympic Stadium, Seoul
	Kim Bong-Gil 79', Noh Soo-Jin 89'		Baek Jong-Chul 40' 66'	Attendance: 4,000; Referee: Kil Ki-Chul

5 August 1989 KPFL	Ilhwa Chunma	2–0	Yukong Elephants	Olympic Stadium, Seoul
	Kim Young-Joo 17', Yoo Seung-Gwan 58'			Attendance: 8,000; Referee: Sim Geon-Taek

15 August 1989 KPFL	Ilhwa Chunma	2–2	Lucky-Goldstar Hwangso	Dongdaemun Stadium, Seoul
	Yoo Seung-Gwan 20', Kim Ki-Wan 37'		Cha Sang-Hae 75', Lee In-Jae 90+1'	Attendance: 8,000; Referee: Park Kyung-In

19 August 1989 KPFL	Ilhwa Chunma	0–0	Yukong Elephants	Dongdaemun Stadium, Seoul
				Attendance: 6,000; Referee: Choi Kil-Soo

23 August 1989 KPFL	Yukong Elephants	2–2	Ilhwa Chunma	Anseong Civil Stadium, Anseong
	Noh Soo-Jin 60', Kim Jun-Hyun 61'		Yoo Seung-Gwan 52', Oh Dong-Cheon 59'	Attendance: 10,000; Referee: Park Hwa-Deok

26 August 1989 KPFL	POSCO Atoms	1–0	Ilhwa Chunma	Steelyard Stadium, Pohang
	Choi Moon-Sik 87'			Attendance: 13,000; Referee: Han Woon-Jib

2 September 1989 KPFL	Ilhwa Chunma	0–2	POSCO Atoms	Dongdaemun Stadium, Seoul
			Park Chang-Hyun 60', Choi Moon-Sik 85'	Attendance: 4,000; Referee: Lim Jung-Sik

6 September 1989 KPFL	Ilhwa Chunma	1–0	Hyundai Horang-i	Olympic Stadium, Seoul
	Yoo Seung-Gwan 65'			Attendance: 2,000; Referee: Sim Geon-Taek

9 September 1989 KPFL	Hyundai Horang-i	0–0	Ilhwa Chunma	Chuncheon Civil Stadium, Chuncheon
				Attendance: 3,500; Referee: Kim In-Soo

16 September 1989 KPFL	Ilhwa Chunma	2–3	Daewoo Royals	Dongdaemun Stadium, Seoul
	Kim Young-Joo 37' 38'		Lee Tae-Ho 30', Park Hyun-Yong 43', Yeo Bum-Kyu 63'	Attendance: 3,000; Referee: Choi Kil-Soo

23 September 1989 KPFL	Ilhwa Chunma	1–1	Yukong Elephants	Dongdaemun Stadium, Seoul
	Ko Jeong-Woon 28'		Cho Yoon-Hwan 52'	Attendance: 2,000; Referee: Kil Ki-Chul

26 September 1989 KPFL	Yukong Elephants	1–0	Ilhwa Chunma	Incheon Civil Stadium, Incheon
	Moon Young-Rae 79'			Attendance: 400; Referee: Kim In-Soo

30 September 1989 KPFL	Ilhwa Chunma	1–2	POSCO Atoms	Dongdaemun Stadium, Seoul
	Park Jong-Dae 37'		Cho Keung-Yeon 02', Choi Moon-Sik 70'	Attendance: 1,000; Referee: Ko Sung-Deuk

3 October 1989 KPFL	POSCO Atoms	1–1	Ilhwa Chunma	Steelyard Stadium, Pohang
	Choi Moon-Sik 90'		Ko Jeong-Woon 88'	Attendance: 12,000; Referee: Han Woon-Jib

7 October 1989 KPFL	Hyundai Horang-i	0–1	Ilhwa Chunma	Chuncheon Civil Stadium, Chuncheon
			Ko Jeong-Woon 60'	Attendance: 6,000; Referee: Park Hee-Cha-Rang

11 October 1989 KPFL	Ilhwa Chunma	0–1	Daewoo Royals	Dongdaemun Stadium, Seoul
			Ahn Seong-Il 85'	Attendance: 3,000; Referee: Park Hwa-Deok

14 October 1989 KPFL	Ilhwa Chunma	1–2	Hyundai Horang-i	Dongdaemun Stadium, Seoul
	Kim Young-Joo 18'		Jung Dong-Bok 09', Lee Jong-Hwa 54'	Attendance: 1,000; Referee: Na Yoon-Sik

18 October 1989 KPFL	Daewoo Royals	0–0	Ilhwa Chunma	Busan Gudeok Stadium, Busan
				Attendance: 1,000; Referee: Sim Geon-Taek

21 October 1989 KPFL	Daewoo Royals	0–0	Ilhwa Chunma	Busan Gudeok Stadium, Busan
				Attendance: 10,000; Referee: Na Yoon-Sik

25 October 1989 KPFL	Lucky-Goldstar Hwangso	4–0	Ilhwa Chunma	Olympic Stadium, Seoul
	Lee Young-Ik 15', Yoon Sang-Chul 47' 82', Joo Kyung-Chul 65'			Attendance: 1,000; Referee: Kim In-Soo

28 October 1989 KPFL	Ilhwa Chunma	2–2	Lucky-Goldstar Hwangso	Olympic Stadium, Seoul
	Yoo Seung-Gwan 28', Ko Jeong-Woon 52'		Cha Sang-Hae 49', Kang Deuk-Su 72'	Attendance: 1,500; Referee: Kim In-Soo
