= 1982 Nehru Cup =

Tournament details
- Host country: India
- Dates: 16 February – 3 March
- Teams: 6 (from 3 confederations)
- Venue: Calcutta

Final positions
- Champions: Uruguay (1st title)
- Runners-up: China

Tournament statistics
- Matches played: 16
- Goals scored: 47 (2.94 per match)

The 1982 Nehru Cup was the first edition of the Nehru Cup. It was held between 16 February to 3 March in Calcutta.

== Format ==
A total of 6 teams participated in the tournament through being invited by the All India Football Federation. The tournament would be played in a round-robin style with the top two in the final standings then meeting in a final match to crown the champions.

Amateur teams and 'B' sides from Europe were invited.

== Matches ==
| Pos | Team | Pld | W | D | L | GF | GA | GD | Pts |
|---|---|---|---|---|---|---|---|---|---|
| 1 | Uruguay | 5 | 3 | 2 | 0 | 9 | 5 | +4 | 8 |
| 2 | China | 5 | 2 | 3 | 0 | 6 | 2 | +4 | 7 |
| 3 | South Korea | 5 | 1 | 4 | 0 | 10 | 8 | +2 | 6 |
| 4 | Italy Olympic | 5 | 2 | 0 | 3 | 7 | 9 | −2 | 4 |
| 5 | India | 5 | 1 | 2 | 2 | 6 | 8 | −2 | 4 |
| 6 | Yugoslavia B | 5 | 0 | 1 | 4 | 3 | 9 | −6 | 1 |

Source: RSSSF
16 February 1982

| India | 1–1 | China |
|---|---|---|
| Bose 59' | | Zuo Shusheng 24' |

Eden Gardens, Calcutta

17 February 1982

| Uruguay | 1–0 | Yugoslavia B |
|---|---|---|
| Francescoli 45' | Report |

Eden Gardens, Calcutta

18 February 1982

| India | 2–2 | South Korea |
|---|---|---|
| Banerjee; Bhattacharya | | Hwang Seok-keun; Chung Jong-soo |

Eden Gardens, Calcutta

19 February 1982

| China | 3–0 | Yugoslavia B |
|---|---|---|
| Lin Lefeng 63'; Zuo Shusheng 74', 87' |

Eden Gardens, Calcutta

20 February 1982

| Uruguay | 2–2 | South Korea |
|---|---|---|
| Ramos 48' (pen.); Nadal 65' | Report | Chung Hae-won 3'; Chang Woe-ryong 15' |

Eden Gardens, Calcutta

21 February 1982

| India | 0–1 | Italy Olympic |

Eden Gardens, Calcutta

22 February 1982

| China | 0–0 | Uruguay |
|---|---|---|
| | Report |

Eden Gardens, Calcutta

23 February 1982

| South Korea | 1–1 | Yugoslavia B |

Eden Gardens, Calcutta

24 February 1982

| China | 1–0 | Italy Olympic |
|---|---|---|
| Chi Shangbin 68' |

Eden Gardens, Calcutta

25 February 1982

| India | 1–3 | Uruguay |
|---|---|---|
| Bhattacharya 35' | Report | da Silva 8', 23'; Saralegui 70' |

Eden Gardens, Calcutta

26 February 1982

| South Korea | 4–2 | Italy Olympic |

Eden Gardens, Calcutta

27 February 1982

| India | 2–1 | Yugoslavia B |
|---|---|---|
| Monoranjan Bhattacharya; Manas Bhattacharya |

Eden Gardens, Calcutta

28 February 1982

| Uruguay | 3–2 | Italy Olympic |
|---|---|---|
| Ramos 7'; Francescoli 48'; González 65' | Report | Lamberto Piovanelli 53'; Romiti 75' |

Eden Gardens, Calcutta

1 March 1982

| China | 1–1 | South Korea |
|---|---|---|
| Shen Xiangfu 80' | | Lee Tae-ho |

Eden Gardens, Calcutta

2 March 1982

| Italy Olympic | 2–1 | Yugoslavia B |

Eden Gardens, Calcutta

=== Final ===
3 March 1982

| Uruguay | 2–0 | China |
|---|---|---|
| Da Silva 23'; Nadal 84' | Report |

Eden Gardens, Calcutta

== Winners ==
1982 Nehru Cup champion

Uruguay
First title
