= Chung Yong-hwan =

South Korean footballer (1960–2015)

Personal information
- Full name: Chung Yong-hwan
- Date of birth: 10 February 1960
- Place of birth: Busan, South Korea
- Date of death: 7 June 2015 (aged 55)
- Place of death: Busan, South Korea
- Height: 1.78 m (5 ft 10 in)
- Position: Centre-back

College career
Years	Team	Apps	(Gls)
1980–1983	Korea University		

Senior career*
Years	Team	Apps	(Gls)
1984–1994	Daewoo Royals	150	(7)

International career
1979	South Korea U20		
1985	South Korea B		
1983–1993	South Korea	86	(3)

Managerial career
- 2007: Yangju Citizen
Medal record
Representing South Korea
Men's football
Asian Games
Gold medal – first place	1986 Seoul
Bronze medal – third place	1990 Beijing
AFC Asian Cup
Runner-up	1988 Qatar
- * Club domestic league appearances and goals

Chung Yong-hwan (Korean: 정용환, 10 February 1960 – 7 June 2015) was a South Korean football player and manager.

== Playing career ==
Chung played as a one-club man for K League club Daewoo Royals after graduating from Korea University. He led Daewoo to win three K League titles and once won the league's MVP award.

Considered one of the best K League defenders during the 1980s, Chung played for the South Korea national team. He largely contributed to South Korea's advance to the 1986 FIFA World Cup, and was named the Most Valuable Player by Korea Football Association after the qualifiers. He played all three group stage matches for his country at the 1986 World Cup, but failed to reach the knockout stage. He captained South Korea in the 1990 FIFA World Cup qualifiers, and once again helped the team qualify for the tournament. At the 1990 FIFA World Cup, however, he played only the first match due to a thigh injury.

Chung left for England to study the system of foreign football in 1995 after finishing his playing career in South Korea. He signed for Third Division team Fulham at the time, but the contract was invalidated because he did not get a work permit.

== Style of play ==
Chung was noted for his jumping ability and did not lose aerial duels against 1.97-m-tall forward Rob Landsbergen, although he was not tall. His fast reaction time and good sense of balance also made his defensive skills accurate. He did not receive a yellow card at the K League for eight years from 1984 to 1991.

== Death ==
Chung died of stomach cancer on 7 June 2015.

== Career statistics ==
=== Club ===
Appearances and goals by club, season and competition
Club	Season	League			National cup		League cup		Continental		Total	
Club	Season	Division	Apps	Goals	Apps	Goals	Apps	Goals	Apps	Goals	Apps	Goals
Daewoo Royals	1984	K League	22	0	—		—		—		22	0
Daewoo Royals	1985	K League	2	0	—		—		? (Note: Appearance(s) in Asian Club Championship)	?	2	0
Daewoo Royals	1986	K League	1	0	—		2	1	?	?	3	1
Daewoo Royals	1987	K League	19	1	—		—		—		19	1
Daewoo Royals	1988	K League	11	0	? (Note: Appearance(s) in Korean National Championship)	?	—		—		11	0
Daewoo Royals	1989	K League	9	0	?	?	—		—		9	0
Daewoo Royals	1990	K League	8	0	—		—		—		8	0
Daewoo Royals	1991	K League	33	2	—		—		—		33	2
Daewoo Royals	1992	K League	25	1	—		10	1	—		35	2
Daewoo Royals	1993	K League	6	2	—		0	0	—		6	2
Daewoo Royals	1994	K League	14	1	—		6	0	—		20	1
Career total			150	7	?	?	18	2	?	?	168	9

=== International ===
Appearances and goals by national team and year
National team	Year	Apps	Goals
South Korea	1983	11	0
South Korea	1984	12	1
South Korea	1985	15	1
South Korea	1986	4	0
South Korea	1987	5	0
South Korea	1988	8	0
South Korea	1989	14	1
South Korea	1990	11	0
South Korea	1992	4	0
South Korea	1993	2	0
Career total		86	3

Results list South Korea's goal tally first.

List of international goals scored by Chung Yong-hwan
No.	Date	Venue	Cap	Opponent	Score	Result	Competition
1	22 April 1984	Singapore	14	New Zealand	1–0	2–0	1984 Summer Olympics qualification
2	26 October 1985	Tokyo, Japan	33	Japan	1–0	2–1	1986 FIFA World Cup qualification
3	25 May 1989	Seoul, South Korea	58	Nepal	1–0	9–0	1990 FIFA World Cup qualification

== Honours ==
Korea University

- Korean President's Cup: 1982
- Korean National Championship runner-up: 1981

Daewoo Royals

- K League 1: 1984, 1987, 1991
- Korean National Championship: 1989
- Asian Club Championship: 1985–86
- Afro-Asian Club Championship: 1986
- Korean League Cup runner-up: 1986

South Korea

- Asian Games: 1986
- Afro-Asian Cup of Nations: 1987
- Dynasty Cup: 1990
- AFC Asian Cup runner-up: 1988

Individual

- K League 1 Best XI: 1984, 1987, 1991
- Korean FA Best XI: 1984, 1985, 1987, 1988
- AFC Asian Cup Team of the Tournament: 1988
- Korean FA Most Valuable Player: 1985, 1988
- K League 1 Most Valuable Player: 1991
- K League All-Star: 1991, 1992
- K League '80s All-Star Team: 2003
