= Careca (footballer, born 1968) =

Brazilian footballer

Personal information
- Date of birth: 27 September 1968 (age 58)
- Place of birth: Passos, Minas Gerais, Brazil
- Height: 1.85 m (6 ft 1 in)
- Position: Striker

Senior career*
Years	Team	Apps	(Gls)
1985–1990	Cruzeiro		
1990–1992	Sporting CP	32	(8)
1992–1993	Famalicão	10	(0)
1993–1994	Cruzeiro	9	(1)
1995	Ponte Preta		
1995	Atlético Mineiro		
1996	América Mineiro		
1997	Londrina		
1997	Coritiba		
1998	Democrata		
1998	Vila Nova		
1999–2000	América Mineiro		

International career
1988–1989	Brazil	7	(0)
Medal record
Men's football
Representing Brazil
Olympic Games
Silver medal – second place	1988 Seoul	Team competition
Pan American Games
Gold medal – first place	1987 Indianapolis	Team competition
- * Club domestic league appearances and goals

Hamilton de Souza (born 27 September 1968), better known as Careca or Careca II, is a Brazilian former professional footballer who played as a striker.

== Career ==
Careca II was born in Passos, Minas Gerais. He played for several Brazilian clubs as Cruzeiro, Atlético Mineiro and Coritiba and also for Sporting CP in Portugal.

Careca competed for Brazil at the 1988 Summer Olympics. In the first round, he started three times in the front line with the famed Romário but did not score and was each time substituted for Bebeto. Careca also played each of Brazil's three games in the knock-out stages and won the silver medal, after Brazil lost the final against the Soviet Union.

Careca II played seven games for the Brazil national team.

In 2008, he served as assistant coach of the youth team of Atlético Mineiro.

== Personal life ==
In July 2015, his son Hamilton de Souza Junior, signed a contract to play for Biu Chun Rangers in the 2015–16 Hong Kong Premier League.
