= 1987 Afro-Asian Cup of Nations =

- Khalifa Stadium hosted the final
South Korea	Egypt
1	1
- after extra time South Korea won 4–3 on penalties
- Date: 6 January 1988
- Venue: Khalifa International Stadium, Doha
- Referee: Jassim Mandi (Bahrain)
- Attendance: 15,000

The 1987 Afro-Asian Cup of Nations was the third edition of the Afro-Asian Cup of Nations, it was contested between South Korea, winners of the 1986 Asian Games, and Egypt, winners of the 1986 African Cup of Nations. The match was played in one leg on 6 January 1988 in Doha, Qatar.

== Qualified teams ==
Country	Qualified as	Previous appearance in tournament
Egypt	1986 African Cup of Nations champions	Debut
South Korea	1986 Asian Games champions	Debut

== Match details ==
6 January 1988
17:00 UTC+3

South Korea	1–1 (a.e.t.)	Egypt
Lee Tae-ho 65'	report	Younes 88'
Penalties
	4–3	(penalty scored) Soliman; (penalty scored) Shehata; (penalty missed) Ramadan; (penalty scored) El-Kass; (penalty missed) Younes

Khalifa International Stadium, Doha, Qatar
Attendance: 15,000
Referee: Jassim Mandi (Bahrain)

South Korea	Egypt

South Korea:
GK	–	Cho Byung-deuk
DF	–	Park Kyung-hoon
DF	–	Gu Sang-bum
DF	–	Cho Young-jeung
DF	–	Jung Yong-hwan
MF	–	Noh Soo-jin
MF	–	Kim Sam-soo
MF	–	Lee Tae-ho
FW	–	Choi Soon-ho
FW	–	Chung Hae-won
FW	–	Byun Byung-joo	Substituted off
Substitutes:
FW	–	Choi Sang-kook	Substituted on
Manager:
... ...

Egypt:
GK	–	Ahmed Shobair
DF	–	Ali Shehata
DF	–	Hamada Sedki
DF	–	Mohamed Omar
DF	–	Mohamed Saad
DF	–	Alaa Mayhoub
MF	–	Ayman Younes
MF	–	Ismail Youssef
MF	–	Mohamed Ramadan
FW	–	Emad Soliman
FW	–	Gamal Abdel-Hamid	Substituted off
Substitutes:
MF	–	Ahmed El-Kass	Substituted on
Manager:
... ...

Assistant referees:
... ... (...)
... ... (...)
Fourth official:
... ... (...)

Man of the Match:
... ... (...)

== Winners ==
South Korea won on penalties 4–3 after 1–1 on final score.

1987 Afro-Asian Cup of Nations

South Korea
1st title
