= Kim Poong-joo =

South Korean footballer (born 1964)

Kim Poong-Joo 김풍주
Personal information
- Date of birth: 1 October 1964 (age 62)
- Place of birth: South Korea
- Height: 1.92 m (6 ft 4 in)
- Position: Goalkeeper

Team information
- Current team: South Korea (goalkeeping coach)

Senior career*
Years	Team	Apps	(Gls)
1983–1996	Pusan Daewoo Royals	159	(0)

International career
1983	South Korea U20		
1988	South Korea U23		
1988–1991	South Korea	19	(0)

Managerial career
- 1997–1999: Pusan Daewoo Royals (goalkeeping coach)
- 2000: Jaehyun Elementary School (goalkeeping coach)
- 2002–2003: South Korea U20 (goalkeeping coach)
- 2004–2008: Ulsan Hyundai Horangi (goalkeeping coach)
- 2009–2011: South Korea U20, South Korea U17 (goalkeeping coach)
- 2012–2013: South Korea (goalkeeping coach)
- 2013–: Goyang Daekyo Noonnoppi (goalkeeping coach)
Medal record
Representing South Korea
Men's football
Asian Games
Bronze medal – third place	1990 Beijing	Team
- * Club domestic league appearances and goals

Kim Poong-Joo (Korean: 김풍주; born 1 October 1964) is a South Korean football coach and former player. He played as a goalkeeper for Pusan Daewoo Royals.

== Career statistics ==
Club performance			League		Cup		League Cup		Continental		Total	
Season	Club	League	Apps	Goals	Apps	Goals	Apps	Goals	Apps	Goals	Apps	Goals
South Korea			League		KFA Cup		League Cup		Asia		Total	
1983	Pusan Daewoo Royals	K-League	1	0	-		-		-		1	0
1984	Pusan Daewoo Royals	K-League	17	0	-		-		-		17	0
1985	Pusan Daewoo Royals	K-League	21	0	-		-		?	?		
1986	Pusan Daewoo Royals	K-League	13	0	-		11	0	?	?		
1987	Pusan Daewoo Royals	K-League	15	0	-		-		-		15	0
1988	Pusan Daewoo Royals	K-League	7	0	-		-		-		7	0
1989	Pusan Daewoo Royals	K-League	6	0	-		-		-		6	0
1990	Pusan Daewoo Royals	K-League	8	0	-		-		-		8	0
1991	Pusan Daewoo Royals	K-League	37	0	-		-		-		37	0
1992	Pusan Daewoo Royals	K-League	0	0	-		0	0	-		0	0
1993	Pusan Daewoo Royals	K-League	19	0	-		5	0	-		24	0
1994	Pusan Daewoo Royals	K-League	11	0	-		6	0	-		17	0
1995	Pusan Daewoo Royals	K-League	0	0	-		0	0	-		0	0
1996	Pusan Daewoo Royals	K-League	4	0	?	?	0	0	-			
Total	South Korea		159	0			22	0				
Career total			159	0			22	0				
