= 1987 K League =

Korean Professional Football League
- Season: 1987
- Dates: 28 March – 8 November 1987
- Champions: Daewoo Royals (2nd title)
- Asian Club Championship: Withdrew
- Matches: 80
- Goals: 199 (2.49 per match)
- Best Player: Chung Hae-won
- Top goalscorer: Choi Sang-kook (15 goals)
- Best goalkeeper: Cho Byung-deuk

The 1987 Korean Professional Football League was the fifth season of the K League. Before the start of this season, the Korean Professional Football Committee was separated from the Korea Football Association. A total of 5 professional teams participated in the league. Hanil Bank withdrew the league from this season. It began on 28 March and ended on 8 November 1987. It was operated with the home and away system for the first time.

== Foreign players ==
Team	Player 1
Daewoo Royals	
Hyundai Horang-i	
Lucky-Goldstar Hwangso	
POSCO Atoms	
Yukong Elephants	(Brazil) Perivaldo

== League table ==
Pos	Team	Pld	W	D	L	GF	GA	GD	Pts
1	Daewoo Royals (C)	32	16	14	2	41	20	+21	46
2	POSCO Atoms	32	16	8	8	64	41	+23	40
3	Yukong Elephants	32	9	9	14	34	43	−9	27
4	Hyundai Horang-i	32	7	12	13	34	40	−6	26
5	Lucky-Goldstar Hwangso	32	7	7	18	26	55	−29	21

Source: RSSSF
(C) Champions

== Top scorers ==
Rank	Scorer	Club	Goals	Apps
1	(South Korea) Choi Sang-kook	POSCO Atoms	15	30
2	(South Korea) Lee Heung-sil	POSCO Atoms	12	29
2	(South Korea) Noh Soo-jin	Yukong Elephants	12	30
4	(South Korea) Kim Joo-sung	Daewoo Royals	10	28
5	(South Korea) Kim Hong-woon	POSCO Atoms	9	26
6	(South Korea) Lee Sang-cheol	Hyundai Horang-i	8	28
7	(South Korea) Park Hang-seo	Lucky-Goldstar Hwangso	7	28

== Awards ==
=== Main awards ===
Award	Winner	Club
Most Valuable Player	(South Korea) Chung Hae-won	Daewoo Royals
Top goalscorer	(South Korea) Choi Sang-kook	POSCO Atoms
Top assist provider	(South Korea) Choi Sang-kook	POSCO Atoms
Rookie of the Year	(South Korea) Kim Joo-sung	Daewoo Royals
Manager of the Year	(South Korea) Lee Cha-man	Daewoo Royals
Best Goalkeeper	(South Korea) Cho Byung-deuk	POSCO Atoms
Fighting Spirit Award	(South Korea) Choi Ki-bong	Yukong Elephants
Exemplary Award	(South Korea) Park No-bong	Daewoo Royals
Best Referee	(South Korea) Park Kyung-in	—

=== Best XI ===
Position	Winner	Club
Goalkeeper	(South Korea) Kim Poong-joo	Daewoo Royals
Defenders	(South Korea) Choi Ki-bong	Yukong Elephants
Defenders	(South Korea) Chung Yong-hwan	Daewoo Royals
Defenders	(South Korea) Park Kyung-hoon	POSCO Atoms
Defenders	(South Korea) Gu Sang-bum	Lucky-Goldstar Hwangso
Midfielders	(South Korea) Kim Sam-soo	Hyundai Horang-i
Midfielders	(South Korea) Noh Soo-jin	Yukong Elephants
Midfielders	(South Korea) Lee Heung-sil	POSCO Atoms
Forwards	(South Korea) Choi Sang-kook	POSCO Atoms
Forwards	(South Korea) Chung Hae-won	Daewoo Royals
Forwards	(South Korea) Kim Joo-sung	Daewoo Royals
