= Park Kyung-hoon =

South Korean footballer and manager

Personal information
- Full name: Park Kyung-hoon
- Date of birth: 19 January 1961 (age 65)
- Place of birth: Seoul, South Korea
- Height: 1.72 m (5 ft 8 in)
- Position: Right-back

Youth career
- 1977–1979: Cheonggu High School

College career
Years	Team	Apps	(Gls)
1980–1983	Hanyang University		

Senior career*
Years	Team	Apps	(Gls)
1984–1992	POSCO Atoms	124	(4)
1993–1994	Yeading		

International career
1981–1990	South Korea	93	(1)

Managerial career
- 2004–2007: South Korea U17
- 2010–2014: Jeju United
- 2016–2017: Seongnam FC
Medal record
Representing South Korea
Men's football
Asian Games
Gold medal – first place	1986 Seoul	Team
Bronze medal – third place	1990 Beijing	Team
AFC Asian Cup
Silver medal – second place	1988 Qatar	Team
- * Club domestic league appearances and goals

Park Kyung-hoon (Korean: 박경훈; born 19 January 1961) is a South Korean football manager and former player. Park played for the South Korea national team in 1986 and 1990 FIFA World Cup. He also won the 1986 Asian Games with the national team.

== Club career ==
Born in the slum of Seoul, (Suyu-dong) Park had liked art originally, but he changed his career path to be a footballer due to his financial problem when becoming a high school student. He spent his professional career in POSCO Atoms, and won three titles in the K League. In the 1988 season, he was named the Most Valuable Player, but he thought that his teammate Lee Kee-keun should deserve the award. He wanted to return it, but the K League Federation rejected his decision.

In 1993, Park announced his retirement and left for England to study abroad. He also played for an English semi-professional club Yeading for a time, and became the first South Korean player to appear in the English FA Cup.

In 2013, K League Federation selected him as the right back of the 30th Anniversary Best XI.

== Style of play ==
Park is regarded as one of the greatest South Korean right backs of all time. Nicknamed the "Progenitor of Overlapping" in South Korea, he was the first South Korean full-back to actively take part in attack.

== Career statistics ==
=== Club ===
Club	Season	League			National cup		League cup		Total	
Club	Season	Division	Apps	Goals	Apps	Goals	Apps	Goals	Apps	Goals
POSCO Atoms	1984	K League	21	0	—		—		21	0
POSCO Atoms	1985	K League	4	0	? (Note: Appearance(s) in Korean National Championship)	?	—		4	0
POSCO Atoms	1986	K League	1	0	—		2	0	3	0
POSCO Atoms	1987	K League	31	0	—		—		31	0
POSCO Atoms	1988	K League	12	0	?	?	—		12	0
POSCO Atoms	1989	K League	5	1	?	?	—		5	1
POSCO Atoms	1990	K League	8	0	—		—		8	0
POSCO Atoms	1991	K League	23	3	—		—		23	3
POSCO Atoms	1992	K League	19	0	—		8	0	27	0
POSCO Atoms	Total		124	4	?	?	10	0	134	4
Yeading	1993–94	Isthmian League Premier Division	?	?	? (Note: Appearance(s) in FA Cup)	?	—		?	?
Yeading	1994–95	Isthmian League Premier Division	?	?	?	?	—		?	?
Yeading	Total		?	?	?	?	—		?	?
Career total			124	4	?	?	10	0	134	4

=== International ===
Appearances and goals by national team and year
National team	Year	Apps	Goals
South Korea	1981	9	0
South Korea	1982	7	0
South Korea	1983	8	0
South Korea	1984	13	0
South Korea	1985	11	0
South Korea	1986	7	0
South Korea	1987	2	0
South Korea	1988	8	0
South Korea	1989	12	1
South Korea	1990	16	0
Career total		93	1

Results list South Korea's goal tally first.

List of international goals scored by Park Kyung-hoon
No.	Date	Venue	Cap	Opponent	Score	Result	Competition
1	3 June 1989	Singapore	67	Nepal	2–0	4–0	1990 FIFA World Cup qualification

== Honours ==
=== Player ===
Hanyang University

- Korean National Championship: 1983

POSCO Atoms B

- Korean National Championship runner-up: 1985

POSCO Atoms

- K League 1: 1986, 1988, 1992

South Korea

- Asian Games: 1986
- AFC Asian Cup runner-up: 1988
- Afro-Asian Cup of Nations: 1987
- Dynasty Cup: 1990

Individual

- Korean FA Best XI: 1981, 1984, 1985, 1986, 1987, 1988
- AFC Asian All-Star: 1982
- K League 1 Best XI: 1984, 1987
- K League 1 Most Valuable Player: 1988
- AFC Asian Cup Team of the Tournament: 1988
- K League '80s All-Star Team: 2003
- K League 30th Anniversary Best XI: 2013

=== Manager ===
Individual

- K League 1 Manager of the Year: 2010
