= Yeo Bum-kyu =

South Korean footballer (born 1962)

Personal information
- Date of birth: June 24, 1962 (age 64)
- Place of birth: South Korea
- Height: 1.74 m (5 ft 9 in)
- Position: Midfielder

Team information
- Current team: Hannam University

Youth career
- Yonsei University

Senior career*
Years	Team	Apps	(Gls)
1986–1992	Daewoo Royals	141	(11)

International career^{‡}
1985–1989	South Korea	7	(1)

Managerial career
- 1995–2001: Chunnam Dragons (coach)
- 2003: Gwangyang Jechul High School
- 2004–2005: Chunnam Dragons (assistant)
- 2006: Gwangyang Jechul High School
- 2007–2010: Hyundai High School
- 2011–2012: Gwangju FC (assistant)
- 2013: Gwangju FC
- * Club domestic league appearances and goals as of 7 December 2012 ‡ National team caps and goals as of 7 December 2012

- Yeo Bum-kyu
- Hangul: 여범규
- Hanja: 余範奎
- RR: Yeo Beomgyu
- MR: Yŏ Pŏmgyu

Yeo Bum-kyu (born June 24, 1962) is a retired South Korean football midfielder.

== International career ==
He was part of the South Korea squad at the 1988 AFC Asian Cup.

== Honours ==
- K League (2)

Daewoo Royals
1987, 1991
