= Cho Byung-deuk =

South Korean footballer (born 1958)

Personal information
- Full name: Cho Byung-deuk
- Date of birth: 26 May 1958 (age 68)
- Place of birth: Ganghwa, Gyeonggi, South Korea
- Height: 1.83 m (6 ft 0 in)
- Position: Goalkeeper

Youth career
- 1972–1974: Seoul Physical Education Middle School
- 1975–1977: Seoul Physical Education High School

College career
Years	Team	Apps	(Gls)
1979–1980	Myongji University		

Senior career*
Years	Team	Apps	(Gls)
1978	POSCO FC		
1981–1986	Hallelujah FC	62	(0)
1987–1990	POSCO Atoms	72	(0)
Total		134	(0)

International career^{‡}
1977	South Korea U20		
1978	South Korea B		
1979–1989	South Korea	44	(0)

Managerial career
- 1997–1998: Hallelujah FC
Medal record
Representing South Korea
Men's football
Asian Games
Gold medal – first place	1986 Seoul	Team
AFC Asian Cup
Silver medal – second place	1980 Kuwait	Team
Silver medal – second place	1988 Qatar	Team
- * Club domestic league appearances and goals as of 1 May 2009 ‡ National team caps and goals as of 1 May 2009

Cho Byung-deuk (Korean: 조병득, born May 26, 1958) is a South Korean former football player and goalkeeper coach.

== Playing career ==
Cho played for South Korea in 1980 AFC Asian Cup, 1986 Asian Games, 1988 Summer Olympics and 1988 AFC Asian Cup. He conceded 29 goals in 44 international matches and won the 1986 Asian Games. He was also selected as a member of South Korean squad for the 1986 FIFA World Cup, but was pushed to the bench by his rival Oh Yun-kyo. He couldn't appear in the World Cup.

== Style of play ==
Cho is regarded as one of the greatest South Korean goalkeepers of all time. He had a supple and nimble body, and showed accurate goal kicks. He is the first goalkeeper to provide an assist in the K League.

== Career statistics ==
=== Club ===
Club	Season	League			Cup		Other		Total	
Club	Season	Division	Apps	Goals	Apps	Goals	Apps	Goals	Apps	Goals
POSCO FC	1978	Semipro League	?	?	? (Note: Appearance(s) in Korean National Championship)	?	? (Note: Appearance(s) in Korean President's Cup)	?	?	?
Hallelujah FC	1981	Semipro League	?	?	?	?	?	?	?	?
Hallelujah FC	1982	Semipro League	?	?	?	?	?	?	?	?
Hallelujah FC	1983	K League	15	0	—		—		15	0
Hallelujah FC	1984	K League	28	0	—		—		28	0
Hallelujah FC	1985	K League	19	0	—		—		19	0
Hallelujah FC	1986	Semipro League	?	?	?	?	?	?	?	?
Hallelujah FC	Total		62	0	?	?	?	?	62	0
POSCO Atoms	1987	K League	18	0	—		—		18	0
POSCO Atoms	1988	K League	6	0	?	?	—		6	0
POSCO Atoms	1989	K League	25	0	?	?	—		25	0
POSCO Atoms	1990	K League	23	0	—		—		23	0
POSCO Atoms	Total		72	0	?	?	—		72	0
Career total			134	0	?	?	?	?	134	0

== Honours ==
Myongji University

- Korean National Championship runner-up: 1979

Hallelujah FC

- K League 1: 1983

POSCO Atoms

- K League 1: 1988

South Korea

- Asian Games: 1986
- AFC Asian Cup runner-up: 1980, 1988
- Afro-Asian Cup of Nations: 1987

Individual

- Korean FA Best XI: 1980, 1985, 1986, 1987, 1988
- K League 1 Best XI: 1983
- K League 1 Best Goalkeeper: 1983, 1987
- K League '80s All-Star Team: 2003
