= Byun Byung-joo =

South Korean footballer

Personal information
- Full name: Byun Byung-joo
- Date of birth: 26 April 1961 (age 65)
- Place of birth: Paju, Gyeonggi, South Korea
- Height: 1.74 m (5 ft 9 in)
- Position: Right winger

College career
Years	Team	Apps	(Gls)
1980–1983	Yonsei University		

Senior career*
Years	Team	Apps	(Gls)
1983–1989	Daewoo Royals	97	(22)
1990–1991	Hyundai Horang-i	32	(6)
Total		129	(28)

International career
1981–1990	South Korea	76	(11)

Managerial career
- 1993–1996: Incheon Steel
- 1998–1999: Yong In University
- 2007–2009: Daegu FC
Medal record
Representing South Korea
Men's football
Asian Games
Gold medal – first place	1986 Seoul
Bronze medal – third place	1990 Beijing
AFC Asian Cup
Runner-up	1988 Qatar
- * Club domestic league appearances and goals

- Byun Byung-joo
- Hangul: 변병주
- Hanja: 邊炳柱
- RR: Byeon Byeongju
- MR: Pyŏn Pyŏngju

Byun Byung-joo (Korean: 변병주; Korean pronunciation: [pjʌn.bjʌŋ.dʑu] or [pjʌn] [pjʌŋ.dʑu]; born 26 April 1961) is a former South Korean football player.

== International career ==
Byun played for the South Korea national football team at the 1986 and 1990 FIFA World Cups. South Korea failed to win a match at either edition of the World Cup. He later expressed deep regret over hitting Bulgaria's goalpost with a crucial shot, which could have secured South Korea's first-ever World Cup victory had it been successful.

Byun scored South Korea's second goal when his team defeated Saudi Arabia 2–0 in the 1986 Asian Games final.

== Style of play ==
Nicknamed the "Bullet" in South Korea, Byun showed fast dribbles and accurate crosses. He was an important winger for South Korea at the time, although he was criticised for his monotonous style.

== Career statistics ==
=== Club ===
Appearances and goals by club, season and competition
Club	Season	League			League cup		Continental		Total	
Club	Season	Division	Apps	Goals	Apps	Goals	Apps	Goals	Apps	Goals
Daewoo Royals	1983	K League	4	1	—		—		4	1
Daewoo Royals	1984	K League	19	4	—		—		19	4
Daewoo Royals	1985	K League	4	1	—		? (Note: Appearance(s) in Asian Club Championship)	?	4	1
Daewoo Royals	1986	K League	10	2	2	0	?	?	12	2
Daewoo Royals	1987	K League	30	5	—		—		30	5
Daewoo Royals	1988	K League	11	2	—		—		11	2
Daewoo Royals	1989	K League	19	7	—		—		19	7
Daewoo Royals	Total		97	22	2	0	?	?	99	22
Hyundai Horang-i	1990	K League	10	3	—		—		10	3
Hyundai Horang-i	1991	K League	22	3	—		—		22	3
Hyundai Horang-i	Total		32	6	—		—		32	6
Career total			129	28	2	0	?	?	131	28

=== International ===
Appearances and goals by national team and year
National team	Year	Apps	Goals
South Korea	1981	8	2
South Korea	1982	6	0
South Korea	1983	8	1
South Korea	1984	13	1
South Korea	1985	12	2
South Korea	1986	7	1
South Korea	1987	1	0
South Korea	1988	10	3
South Korea	1989	3	0
South Korea	1990	8	1
Career total		76	11

Results list South Korea's goal tally first.

List of international goals scored by Byun Byung-joo
No.	Date	Venue	Cap	Opponent	Score	Result	Competition
1	4 September 1981	Kuala Lumpur, Malaysia	6	Singapore	2–0	2–0	1981 Pestabola Merdeka
2	13 September 1981	Kuala Lumpur, Malaysia	7	Iraq	1–0	1–1	1981 Pestabola Merdeka
3	9 August 1983	San José, Costa Rica	22	Costa Rica	1–1	1–1	Friendly
4	4 October 1984	Seoul, South Korea	27	Cameroon	2–0	5–0	Friendly
5	21 July 1985	Seoul, South Korea	41	Indonesia	1–0	2–0	1986 FIFA World Cup qualification
6	30 July 1985	Jakarta, Indonesia	42	Indonesia	1–0	4–1	1986 FIFA World Cup qualification
7	5 October 1986	Seoul, South Korea	54	Saudi Arabia	2–0	2–0	1986 Asian Games
8	19 June 1988	Suwon, South Korea	57	Zambia	1–0	4–0	1988 Korea Cup
9	11 December 1988	Doha, Qatar	63	Iran	1–0	3–0	1988 AFC Asian Cup
10	11 December 1988	Doha, Qatar	63	Iran	3–0	3–0	1988 AFC Asian Cup
11	5 September 1990	Seoul, South Korea	74	Australia	1–0	1–0	Friendly

== Honours ==
Yonsei University

- Korean President's Cup: 1980

Daewoo Royals

- K League 1: 1984, 1987
- Korean National Championship: 1989
- Korean League Cup runner-up: 1986
- Asian Club Championship: 1985–86
- Afro-Asian Club Championship: 1986

South Korea

- Asian Games: 1986
- Afro-Asian Cup of Nations: 1987
- AFC Asian Cup runner-up: 1988
- Dynasty Cup: 1990

Individual

- Korean FA Best XI: 1981
- AFC Asian Cup Team of the Tournament: 1988
