= Chung Hae-won =

South Korean footballer (1959–2020)

Personal information
- Full name: Chung Hae-won
- Date of birth: 1 July 1959
- Place of birth: South Korea
- Date of death: 1 May 2020 (aged 60)
- Place of death: Goyang, Gyeonggi, South Korea
- Height: 1.78 m (5 ft 10 in)
- Position: Forward

Youth career
- 1976–1978: Anyang Technical High School

College career
Years	Team	Apps	(Gls)
1979–1982	Yonsei University		

Senior career*
Years	Team	Apps	(Gls)
1983–1991	Daewoo Royals	147	(34)

International career
1978	South Korea U20		
1979	South Korea B		
1980–1990	South Korea	66	(22)

Managerial career
- 1994: Daewoo Royals
Medal record
Representing South Korea
Men's football
AFC Asian Cup
Silver medal – second place	1980 Kuwait	Team
Silver medal – second place	1988 Qatar	Team
AFC Youth Championship
Gold medal – first place	1978 Bangladesh	Team
- * Club domestic league appearances and goals

Chung Hae-won (Korean: 정해원; Hanja: 丁海遠, 1 July 1959 – 1 May 2020) was a South Korean football player and coach.

== International career ==
After winning the 1978 AFC Youth Championship as a member of the national under-20 team, Chung played as a left winger or a striker for senior national team. He scored two crucial goals to give South Korea a 2–1 win over North Korea in the semi-finals of the 1980 AFC Asian Cup, sending his team to the final.

Chung was selected for the national team for the 1988 Summer Olympics. However, he was injured during the first match against Soviet Union, and had to finish his competition early. He also participated as an attacking midfielder in the 1990 FIFA World Cup.

== Career statistics ==
=== International ===
Appearances and goals by national team and year
National team	Year	Apps	Goals
South Korea	1980	17	7
South Korea	1981	10	3
South Korea	1982	10	3
South Korea	1984	8	3
South Korea	1987	4	1
South Korea	1988	9	4
South Korea	1989	6	1
South Korea	1990	2	0
Career total		66	22

List of international goals scored by Chung Hae-won
No.	Date	Venue	Opponent	Score	Result	Competition
1	27 March 1980	Kuala Lumpur, Malaysia	Philippines	2–0	10–0	1980 Summer Olympics qualification
2	31 March 1980	Kuala Lumpur, Malaysia	Brunei	3–0	3–0	1980 Summer Olympics qualification
3	25 August 1980	Chuncheon, South Korea	Indonesia	2–0	3–0	1980 Korea Cup
4	2 September 1980	Seoul, South Korea	Indonesia	1–0	2–0	1980 Korea Cup
5	24 September 1980	Kuwait City, Kuwait	United Arab Emirates	4–1	4–1	1980 AFC Asian Cup
6	28 September 1980	Kuwait City, Kuwait	North Korea	1–1	2–1	1980 AFC Asian Cup
7	28 September 1980	Kuwait City, Kuwait	North Korea	2–1	2–1	1980 AFC Asian Cup
8	8 March 1981	Tokyo, Japan	Japan	1–0	1–0	Friendly
9	17 June 1981	Jeonju, South Korea	Malaysia	1–0	2–0	1981 Korea Cup
10	17 June 1981	Jeonju, South Korea	Malaysia	2–0	2–0	1981 Korea Cup
11	20 February 1982	Kolkata, India	Uruguay	1–0	2–2	1982 Nehru Cup
12	9 May 1982	Bangkok, Thailand	Thailand	2–0	3–0	1982 King's Cup
13	21 November 1982	New Delhi, India	South Yemen	1–0	3–0	1982 Asian Games
14	24 April 1984	Singapore	Saudi Arabia	2–0	4–5	1984 Summer Olympics qualification
15	10 October 1984	Kolkata, India	North Yemen	?–0	6–0	1984 AFC Asian Cup qualification
16	10 October 1984	Kolkata, India	North Yemen	?–0	6–0	1984 AFC Asian Cup qualification
17	14 June 1987	Daejeon, South Korea	Thailand	3–1	4–2	1987 Korea Cup
18	19 June 1988	Suwon, South Korea	Zambia	3–0	4–0	1988 Korea Cup
19	19 June 1988	Suwon, South Korea	Zambia	4–0	4–0	1988 Korea Cup
20	9 December 1988	Doha, Qatar	Qatar	1–0	3–2	1988 AFC Asian Cup
21	9 December 1988	Doha, Qatar	Qatar	3–1	3–2	1988 AFC Asian Cup
22	23 May 1989	Seoul, South Korea	Singapore	3–0	3–0	1990 FIFA World Cup qualification

== Honours ==
Yonsei University

- Korean President's Cup: 1980

Daewoo Royals

- K League 1: 1984, 1987, 1991
- Korean National Championship: 1989
- Korean League Cup runner-up: 1986
- Asian Club Championship: 1985–86
- Afro-Asian Club Championship: 1986

South Korea U20

- AFC Youth Championship: 1978

South Korea

- AFC Asian Cup runner-up: 1980, 1988
- Afro-Asian Cup of Nations: 1987

Individual

- Korean President's Cup Best Player: 1980
- Korean President's Cup top goalscorer: 1980
- Korean FA Best XI: 1980, 1981, 1986, 1987, 1988
- AFC Asian All-Star: 1982
- K League 1 top goalscorer: 1986
- K League 1 Best XI: 1986, 1987
- K League 1 Most Valuable Player: 1987
- AFC Asian Cup Team of the Tournament: 1988
- K League '80s All-Star Team: 2003
