= Oleksiy Cherednyk =

Soviet footballer (born 1960)

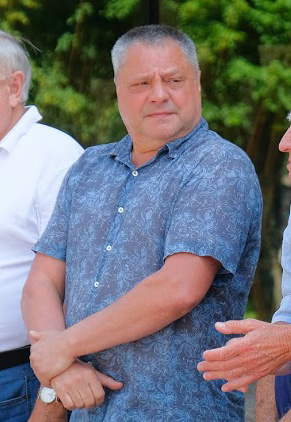
- Oleksiy Cherednyk in 2018

Personal information
- Full name: Oleksiy Valentynovich Cherednyk
- Date of birth: 15 September 1960 (age 66)
- Place of birth: Stalinabad, Tajik SSR
- Height: 1.77 m (5 ft 10 in)
- Positions: Defender; midfielder

Team information
- Current team: Shakhtar Donetsk (scout)

Youth career
- 1974–1978: Pamir Dushanbe

Senior career*
Years	Team	Apps	(Gls)
1979–1982	Pamir Dushanbe	134	(4)
1983–1989	Dnipro Dnipropetrovsk	141	(7)
1990–1993	Southampton	23	(0)
1994	Chornomorets Odesa	3	(0)
1995	Metalurh Zaporizhya	6	(0)
1995–1996	Kryvbas Kryvyi Rih	5	(0)
Total		312	(11)

International career
1986–1988	USSR (Olympic)	8	(0)
1989	USSR	2	(0)

Managerial career
- 1996: Kryvbas Kryvyi Rih
- 1997: Torpedo Zaporizhzhia
Medal record
Representing the Soviet Union
Men's football
Gold medal – first place	1988 Seoul	Team
- * Club domestic league appearances and goals

Aleksei Valentinovich Cherednik (Russian: Алексей Валентинович Чередник, Ukrainian: Олексій Валентинович Чередник; born 15 September 1960) is a Soviet, Tajikistani, and Ukrainian former professional footballer who later for quite some time played in Ukraine and later became a Ukrainian football manager and a scout for Shakhtar Donetsk and FC Dnipro.

== Career ==
Cherednyk was born in Dushanbe, at that time "Stalinabad". His parents moved to Tajikistan in the 1930s, his father came from near Volgograd and his mother from near Penza. To football, Cherednyk arrived by coming into a local sports school in Dushanbe as a companion to his friend. Initially, he started as a goalkeeper, but, due to his height, he was reassigned as a defender. His first coach was Vladimir Maksakov. To Pamir, Cherednyk arrived in 1977 when the team was managed by Ishtvan Sekech.

In late 1982, when Pamir was playing a few matches back-to-back in Ukraine (Zaporizhia – Nikopol) during the 1982 Soviet First League season, Cherednyk was snatched from under the nose of Dinamo Moscow by the Dnipro scouts.

== International career ==
Cherednyk made his debut for USSR on 21 February 1989 in a friendly against Bulgaria.

== Honours ==
Dnipro Dnipropetrovsk

- Soviet Top League: 1988
- Soviet Cup: 1989

Soviet Union

- Olympic champion: 1988
