= Volodymyr Lyutyi =

Ukrainian footballer (born 1962)

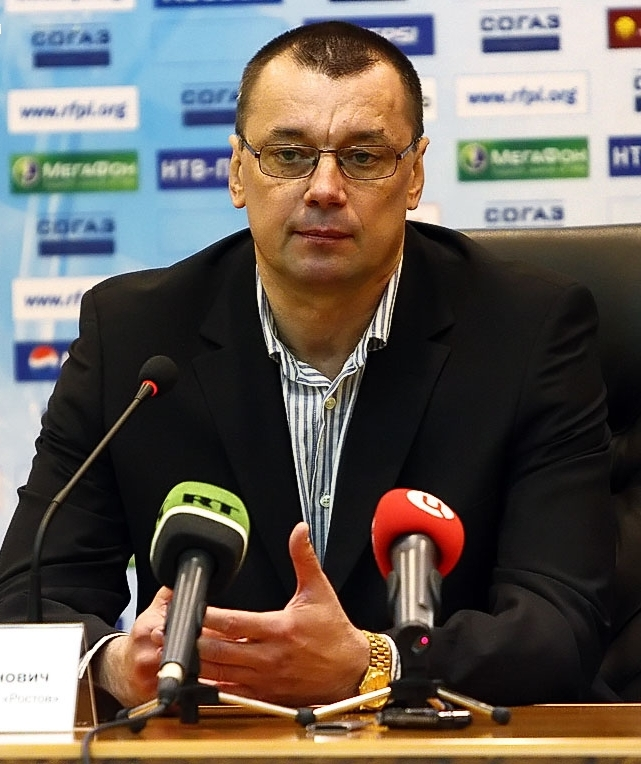
- Lyutyi in 2011

Personal information
- Full name: Volodymyr Ivanovych Lyutyi
- Date of birth: 20 April 1962 (age 64)
- Place of birth: Dnipropetrovsk, Ukrainian SSR, Soviet Union
- Height: 1.88 m (6 ft 2 in)
- Positions: Midfielder; striker

Senior career*
Years	Team	Apps	(Gls)
1979–1989	Dnipro Dnipropetrovsk	250	(51)
1989–1991	Schalke 04	45	(9)
1991–1992	MSV Duisburg	36	(6)
1992	VfL Bochum	3	(0)
1993	Bursaspor	2	(0)
1993	Rot-Weiß Oberhausen	6	(0)
1994	SpVgg Unterhaching	10	(6)
1994–1996	FSV Salmrohr	43	(5)
1996	Dnipro Dnipropetrovsk	1	(0)
1996–1997	Preußen Köln		
1997–1998	SV Wittlich		
1998–1999	FV Bad Honnef		
1999–2001	FC Junkersdorf		

International career
1986–1988	USSR (Olympic)	12	(3)
1990–1992	USSR / CIS	6	(1)

Managerial career
- 2004-2006: Fortuna Bonn
- 2007: Lokomotiv Moscow (assistant)
- 2009-2010: FV Bad Honnef
- 2010–2011: FC Rostov (assistant)
- 2011: FC Rostov (head coach)
- 2013: Nistru Otaci
- 2013: Rapid Ghidighici
- 2014–2015: FC Saxan
- 2016: FC Ternopil (sportive director)
- 2016: FC Zugdidi
- 2017: PFC Sumy
- 2017-2018: TSV Oldenburg
- 2018-2019: FC Hansa Rostock U19
- 2020-2021: Rostocker FC
- 2022-2024: FC Hansa Rostock U17 (assistant)
Medal record
Men's Summer Olympics
Soviet Union
Gold medal – first place	1988 Seoul	Team competition
- * Club domestic league appearances and goals

Volodymyr Ivanovych Lyutyi (Ukrainian: Володимир Іванович Лютий; born 20 April 1962) is a football coach and a former player from Ukraine.

== Career ==
Lyutyi was born in Dnipropetrovsk. After playing for the Soviet FC Dnipro Dnipropetrovsk, Lyutyi spent almost another ten years playing in Germany for such clubs like Schalke 04, MSV Duisburg, VfL Bochum and SpVgg Unterhaching, and Turkish club Bursaspor.

He earned six caps for USSR and CIS from 1990 to 1992, and played in the 1990 FIFA World Cup and the 1992 UEFA European Football Championship. He also won a gold medal in the 1988 Olympics.

After his playing career he worked as a coach in Germany, Russia, Moldova, Georgia and the Ukraine, notable assignments were Lokomotiv Moscow, FC Rostov and Hansa Rostock.

He currently lives in Germany.

== Honours ==
- Soviet Top League: 1983, 1988
- Soviet Cup: 1989
- USSR Federation Cup: 1986, 1989
- USSR Super Cup: 1989
- Olympic Gold medal : 1988
- 2. Bundesliga : 1991
