= Mario Lucca =

Argentine footballer

Personal information
- Full name: Mario Bruno Lucca Guerra
- Date of birth: 6 August 1961 (age 65)
- Place of birth: Tucumán, Argentina
- Height: 1.85 m (6 ft 1 in)
- Position: Defender

Youth career
- 1979–1980: Atlético Tucumán

Senior career*
Years	Team	Apps	(Gls)
1980–1981	Atlético Tucumán	10	(0)
1982–1983	Nueva Chicago	76	(3)
1984–1991	Vélez Sársfield	282	(16)
1992–1994	Unión Española	88	(9)
1995–1996	Deportes Temuco	56	(9)
1997	Deportes La Serena	28	(3)
1998	Audax Italiano	19	(0)

International career
1988	Argentina Olympic	4	(0)
- * Club domestic league appearances and goals

Mario Bruno Lucca Guerra (born August 6, 1961, in Tucumán, Argentina) is an Argentine naturalized Chilean former footballer who played as a defender for clubs in Argentina and Chile.

== Teams ==
- Atlético Tucumán, 1980–1981
- Nueva Chicago, 1982–1983
- Vélez Sársfield, 1984–1991
- Unión Española, 1992–1994
- Deportes Temuco, 1995–1996
- Deportes La Serena, 1997
- Audax Italiano, 1998

== Personal life ==
Lucca acquired Chilean citizenship by descent from his mother's side.

Mario is the father of former footballer Valeria Lucca.

== Honours ==
Unión Española

- Copa Chile: 1992, 1993
