= Kim Yong-se =

South Korean footballer

Kim Yong-Se 김용세
Personal information
- Full name: Kim Yong-Se
- Date of birth: April 21, 1960 (age 66)
- Place of birth: Paju, Gyeonggi, South Korea
- Height: 1.92 m (6 ft 3 1/2 in)
- Position: Striker

Youth career
- Joongdong High School

Senior career*
Years	Team	Apps	(Gls)
1979	Korea Electric Power		
1980–1982	Army FC (Military service)		
1982–1988	Yukong Elephants	104	(39)
1989–1991	Ilhwa Chunma	58	(14)

International career^{‡}
1979	South Korea U-20		
1984–1989	South Korea	13	(4)
- * Club domestic league appearances and goals as of 12 June 2009 ‡ National team caps and goals as of 12 June 2009

Kim Yong-Se (Korean: 김용세; Hanja: 金鏞世, born April 21, 1960) is a former South Korean football player.

== Playing career ==
After graduating from high school, he started his football career with amateur side Korea Electric Power. One year later, he went to ROK Army for military duty. From 1982 to 1988, he played in K-League side Yukong Elephants as a founding member. In 1989, he moved to Ilhwa Chunma as the first free agent in the K-League.

== International career ==
He was a participant at 1979 FIFA World Youth Championship as a member of South Korea U-20 and 1986 FIFA World Cup and 1988 Summer Olympics as a member of South Korea. Especially, he played as a defender in the 1986 FIFA World Cup.

== Honours ==
=== Club ===
Yukong Elephants

- K-League
  - Runner-up (1): 1984

=== Individual ===
- K-League Best XI (3) : 1983, 1985, 1986
- K-League Fighting Spirit Award (1) : 1985
