= Gela Ketashvili =

Georgian footballer (born 1965)

Personal information
- Full name: Gela Georgiyevich Ketashvili
- Date of birth: 27 September 1965 (age 61)
- Place of birth: Tbilisi, Georgian SSR
- Height: 1.74 m (5 ft 9 in)
- Position: Defender

Senior career*
Years	Team	Apps	(Gls)
1983	Torpedo Kutaisi	27	(0)
1984–1990	Dinamo Tbilisi	137	(4)
1991	Guria Lanchkhuti	7	(0)
1993–1994	FC Tetri Artsivi		
1995	Dinamo Tbilisi	3	(0)

International career
1986–1988	USSR (Olympic)	11	(0)
1986–1988	USSR	3	(0)
1990	Georgia	1	(0)
Medal record
Representing the Soviet Union
Men's football
Gold medal – first place	1988 Seoul	Team
- * Club domestic league appearances and goals

Gela Giorgis dze Ketashvili (Georgian: გელა გიორგის ძე კეტაშვილი, Russian: Гела Георгиевич Кеташвили) (born 27 September 1965) is a Soviet and Georgian retired footballer who played as a defender. He won the gold medal at the 1988 Summer Olympics.

== International career ==
Ketashvili made his debut for USSR on 10 May 1989 in a 1990 FIFA World Cup qualifier against Turkey. He was not selected for the World Cup squad. He also played for Georgia.

== Honours ==
- Olympic Champion: 1988
