= Yevgeni Kuznetsov (footballer, born 1961) =

Russian footballer

Personal information
- Full name: Yevgeni Borisovich Kuznetsov
- Date of birth: 30 August 1961 (age 65)
- Place of birth: Yaroslavl, Yaroslavl Oblast, Russian SFSR
- Height: 1.80 m (5 ft 11 in)
- Position: Midfielder

Youth career
- Yaroslavets Yaroslavl

Senior career*
Years	Team	Apps	(Gls)
1980–1981	Shinnik Yaroslavl	66	(13)
1982–1989	Spartak Moscow	209	(23)
1990–1993	Norrköping	84	(12)
1994–1995	Skellefteå	33	(8)
1995	Lokomotiv Moscow	10	(1)
1996	Chunnam Dragons	8	(1)
1997	Öster	6	(0)
1997–1998	Mjällby	19	(0)
1999–2000	Karlskrona		

International career
1986–1988	Soviet Union (Olympic)	11	(1)

Managerial career
- 1999–2000: Karlskrona
- 2001–2003: Öster
- 2004: Anzhi Makhachkala
- 2008–2009: Öster
- * Club domestic league appearances and goals

Olympic medal record

Representing the Soviet Union

Men's football
Gold medal – first place	1988 Seoul	Team

Yevgeni Borisovich Kuznetsov (Russian: Евгений Борисович Кузнецов; born 30 August 1961) is a Russian professional football coach and a former player.

== Club career ==
He made his professional debut in the Soviet First League in 1980 for FC Shinnik Yaroslavl. Kuznetsov played in the Soviet Union for Shinnik Yaroslavl and Spartak Moscow, for Swedish clubs Norrköping, Skellefteå, Öster, Mjällby and Karlskrona, in Russia for Lokomotiv Moscow, and for South Korean club Chunnam Dragons.

== Honours ==
- Olympic Champion: 1988 (team captain).
- Soviet Top League champion: 1987, 1989.
- Soviet Top League runner-up: 1983, 1984, 1985.
- Soviet Top League bronze: 1982, 1986.
- Russian Premier League runner-up: 1995.
- Russian Cup winner: 1996 (played in the early stages of the 1995/96 tournament for FC Lokomotiv Moscow.
- Allsvenskan runner-up: 1990, 1991, 1992.
- Svenska Cupen winner: 1991.

== European club competitions ==
- UEFA Cup 1986–87 with FC Spartak Moscow : 5 games.
- UEFA Cup 1987–88 with FC Spartak Moscow : 4 games.
- European Cup 1988–89 with FC Spartak Moscow : 3 games.
- UEFA Cup 1989–90 with FC Spartak Moscow : 4 games.
- UEFA Cup 1995–96 with FC Lokomotiv Moscow : 1 game.
