= Aleksei Prudnikov =

Russian footballer

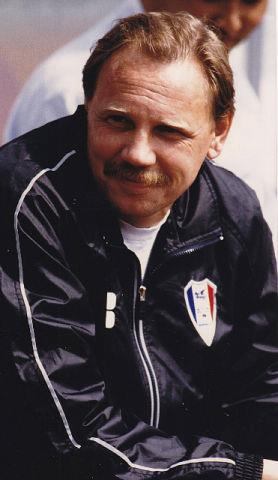

Personal information
- Full name: Aleksei Pavlovich Prudnikov
- Date of birth: 20 March 1960 (age 66)
- Place of birth: Moscow, Russian SFSR, Soviet Union
- Height: 1.89 m (6 ft 2 in)
- Position: Goalkeeper

Senior career*
| Years | Team | Apps | (Gls) |
| 1978–1982 | Spartak Moscow | 17 | (0) |
| 1983–1987 | Dynamo Moscow | 129 | (0) |
| 1988 | Torpedo Moscow | 5 | (0) |
| 1989–1990 | Spartak Moscow | 2 | (0) |
| 1990–1991 | Velež Mostar | 2 | (0) |
| 1991–1992 | Sarajevo | 18 | (0) |
| 1993 | Jaro | 16 | (0) |
| 1994 | Baltika Kaliningrad | 10 | (0) |
| 1995 | Kolos Krasnodar | 38 | (0) |
| 1995–1998 | Chonbuk Hyundai Dinos | 45 | (0) |

International career
| 1982 | Soviet Union U-21 | 1 | (0) |
| 1987 | Soviet Union Olympic Team | 1 | (0) |
| 1988 | Soviet Union XI | 1 | (0) |
- * Club domestic league appearances and goals

Olympic medal record

Representing Soviet Union

Men's football
| Gold medal – first place | 1988 Seoul | Team |

Aleksei Pavlovich Prudnikov (Russian: Алексей Павлович Прудников; born 20 March 1960) is a former USSR and Russian football player who played as a goalkeeper.

== Club career ==
His clubs were Spartak Moscow, Dynamo Moscow, Torpedo Moscow, Baltika Kaliningrad, Kolos Krasnodar, and Velež Mostar, Sarajevo in Yugoslavia, Chonbuk Hyundai Dinos in South Korea, Jaro in Finland.

== International ==
Prudnikov played for the Soviet U-21 and Olympic teams, as well as an unofficial Soviet representative team at the 1988 President's Cup Football Tournament.
