= Chung Jong-soo =

South Korean footballer (born 1961)

Chung Jong-Soo
Personal information
- Full name: Chung Jong-Soo
- Date of birth: 27 March 1961 (age 65)
- Place of birth: South Korea
- Height: 1.74 m (5 ft 8 1/2 in)
- Position: Defender

Team information
- Current team: Chung Jong-Soo Youth Academy

Youth career
- 1981–1982: Korea University

Senior career*
Years	Team	Apps	(Gls)
1984–1989	Yukong Elephants	102	(1)
1990–1995	Hyundai Horang-i	104	(1)
Total		206	(2)

International career
1982–1992	South Korea	36	(3)

Managerial career
- 1996–2000: Ulsan Hyundai Horang-i Reserve
- 2000: Ulsan Hyundai Horang-i (Caretaker)
- 2000–2001: Ulsan Hyundai Horang-i Reserve
- 2001–2006: Ulsan Hyundai Horang-i (Coach)
- 2007–Present: Chung Jong-Soo Youth Academy
- * Club domestic league appearances and goals

Chung Jong-soo
Medal record

Representing South Korea

Men's football

Asian Games
Gold medal – first place	1986 Seoul	Team
Bronze medal – third place	1990 Beijing	Team

Chung Jong-Soo (Korean: 정종수; born 27 March 1961) is a South Korean former international footballer who played professionally as a defender for Yukong Elephants and Hyundai Horang-i. He represented South Korea at the 1986 FIFA World Cup and 1990 FIFA World Cup.
