= Fabián Cancelarich =

Argentine footballer (1965–2024)

Personal information
- Full name: Fabián Oscar Cancelarich
- Date of birth: 30 December 1965
- Place of birth: San José de la Esquina, Santa Fe Province, Argentina
- Date of death: 14 May 2024 (aged 58)
- Place of death: Buenos Aires, Argentina
- Height: 1.91 m (6 ft 3 in)
- Position: Goalkeeper

Senior career*
Years	Team	Apps	(Gls)
1986–1992	Ferro Carril Oeste		
1992–1993	Belgrano	51	(0)
1994	Newell's Old Boys	7	(0)
1994	Belgrano	3	(0)
1995	Millonarios		
1995–1996	Huracán	2	(0)
1996–1997	Talleres de Córdoba		
1997–1999	Platense	45	(0)
1999–2000	Ferro Carril Oeste	14	(0)
2000–2004	Central Córdoba		

International career
1988–1993	Argentina	0	(0)
Medal record
Men's football
Representing Argentina
FIFA World Cup
Silver medal – second place	1990 Italy	Team
FIFA Confederations Cup
Gold medal – first place	1992 Saudi Arabia	Team
Copa América
Gold medal – first place	1991 Chile	Team
Pan American Games
Bronze medal – third place	1987 United States	Team
- * Club domestic league appearances and goals

Fabián Oscar Cancelarich (30 December 1965 – 14 May 2024) was an Argentine professional footballer who played as a goalkeeper.

== Club career ==
Born in San José de la Esquina, Cancelarich started his club career in 1986 with Ferro Carril Oeste in the Primera Division Argentina. In 1992, he was transferred to Belgrano de Córdoba and in 1994 he played for Newell's Old Boys.

In 1995, Cancelarich moved to Colombia to play for Millonarios, but he soon returned to the Argentine Primera with Huracán 1995–1996 and Platense 1997–1999.

In 1999, Cancelarich returned to Ferro, the club where he started his career, after this final spell in the Primera Cancelarich moved to 2nd division Central Córdoba in 2000. In 2002, Central Córdoba were relegated to the 3rd division, Cancelarich stayed with the club until his retirement in 2004.

He totalled 203 matches for Ferrocarril Oeste.

== International career ==
He was part of his country's squad at the 1987 Panamerican Games and the 1988 Olympic Games and served as the reserve goalkeeper for Argentina during the 1990 FIFA World Cup. In 1991, he was part of the Argentina squad that won the Copa América. Although he was called up around 30 times for the national team, Cancelarich never earned a senior cap with the Albiceleste.

== Personal life ==
=== Death ===
Cancelarich died of a heart attack in Buenos Aires, on 14 May 2024, at the age of 58.

== Honours ==
Ferro Carril Oeste

- Argentine Primera División: 1984

Argentina

- Copa América: 1991
- FIFA Confederations Cup: 1992
- FIFA World Cup runner-up: 1990
