= Yuri Savichev =

Russian footballer

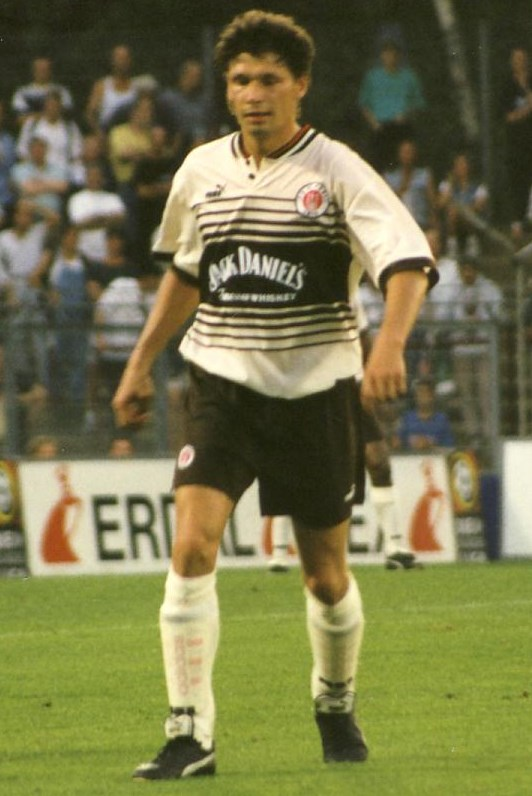
- Savichev with FC St. Pauli during the 1997–98 season

Personal information
- Full name: Yuri Nikolayevich Savichev
- Date of birth: 13 February 1965 (age 61)
- Place of birth: Moscow, Russian SFSR
- Height: 1.81 m (5 ft 11 in)
- Position: Forward

Senior career*
Years	Team	Apps	(Gls)
1984	FShM Moscow		
1984–1990	Torpedo Moscow	135	(47)
1990–1992	Olympiacos	45	(16)
1992–1994	1. FC Saarbrücken	69	(20)
1994–2000	FC St. Pauli	88	(26)
Total		337	(109)

International career
1986–1988	Soviet Union (Olympic)	9	(2)
1988–1990	Soviet Union	8	(0)

Managerial career
- Niendorfer TSV (assistant coach)
Medal record
Representing Soviet Union
Men's football
Gold medal – first place	1988 Seoul	Team
- * Club domestic league appearances and goals

Yuri Nikolayevich Savichev (Russian: Юрий Николаевич Савичев, born 13 February 1965) is a Russian former professional footballer who played as a forward. He is an identical twin brother of Nikolai Savichev and an uncle of Daniil Savichev.

== Club career ==
Savichev was born in Moscow.

== International career ==
Savichev played for the Soviet Union national team at the 1988 Olympic Games, where Savichev struck the winning goal during extra-time in the 103rd minute of the final against Romário's Brazil. He made his debut for USSR on 19 October 1988 in a 1990 FIFA World Cup qualifier against Austria. He was not selected for the final tournament squad.

== Honours ==
Torpedo Moscow

- Soviet Cup: 1986
- Soviet Top League bronze: 1988

Olympiacos

- Greek Football Cup: 1992

Soviet Union

- Olympic champion: 1988

Individual

- Top 33 players year-end list: 1986, 1987, 1988, 1989
- Member of the Grigory Fedotov club
