= Viktor Losev =

Russian footballer

Personal information
- Full name: Viktor Vasilyevich Losev
- Date of birth: 25 January 1959 (age 67)
- Place of birth: Murom, Russian SFSR, Soviet Union
- Height: 1.70 m (5 ft 7 in)
- Position: Defender

Youth career
- 1976: Avangard Murom

Senior career*
| Years | Team | Apps | (Gls) |
| 1976–1978 | FC Torpedo Vladimir | | |
| 1979–1980 | FC Torpedo Moscow | 29 | (0) |
| 1981–1985 | FC Fakel Voronezh | 198 | (4) |
| 1986–1992 | FC Dynamo Moscow | 169 | (0) |
| 1999–2000 | FC Serpukhov (amateur) | | |

International career
| 1986–1988 | USSR (Olympic) | 12 | (0) |
| 1987 | USSR | 3 | (0) |

Managerial career
- 1994: FC Tekhinvest-M Moscow (assistant)
- 1996–1998: FC Fakel Voronezh (assistant)
- 1999–2000: FC Serpukhov (assistant)
- 2001: FC Fakel Voronezh
- 2002: FC Khimki (assistant)
- 2003–2005: Russia U-19 (assistant)
- 2005–2010: Russia U-21 (assistant)
- 2012–2015: FC Ufa (assistant)
- 2017–2018: Kazakhstan (assistant)
- 2020: FC Ararat Yerevan (assistant)
- 2021–2022: FC Torpedo Moscow (assistant)
- * Club domestic league appearances and goals

Olympic medal record

Representing the Soviet Union

Men's football
| Gold medal – first place | 1988 Seoul | Team |

Viktor Vasilyevich Losev (Russian: Виктор Васильевич Лосев; born 25 January 1959) is a Russian football coach and a former player.

== Honours ==
As a player

- Olympic Champion: 1988 (team captain).
- Soviet Top League runner-up: 1986.
- Soviet Top League bronze: 1990.
- Russian Premier League bronze: 1992.

As an assistant coach

- Russian Football National League : 2021-22

== International career ==
Losev made his debut for USSR on 29 August 1987 in a friendly against Yugoslavia. He also played in a UEFA Euro 1988 qualification match against France
