= Darío Siviski =

Argentine footballer

Personal information
- Full name: Darío Andrés Siviski
- Date of birth: 20 December 1962 (age 63)
- Place of birth: Avellaneda, Argentina
- Position: Midfielder

Youth career
- 1978–1980: River Plate

Senior career*
Years	Team	Apps	(Gls)
1981–1983	Temperley	?	(?)
1984–1985	Toluca	29	(2)
1985–1986	Temperley	?	(?)
1986–1990	San Lorenzo	126	(21)
1990–1991	Servette	?	(?)
1991–1992	Independiente	27	(4)
1992–1993	Estudiantes	?	
1993	Servette	20	(0)
1994–1995	Avispa Fukuoka	?	(?)
1995–1996	Grupo Universitario	?	(?)
1997–1999	Temperley	?	(?)

International career
1987–1990	Argentina	6	(0)
- * Club domestic league appearances and goals as of October 2008

Darío Andrés Siviski (born 20 December 1962 in Avellaneda) is a former Argentine football midfielder who played for a number of clubs in Argentina, Mexico, Switzerland and Japan. He represented Argentina at the 1988 Olympic games and played for the full Argentina national team at Copa América 1987. Siviski started his playing career in 1981 with Temperley he spent some time in Mexico with Toluca before returning to Temperley in 1985. In 1986 Siviski joined San Lorenzo de Almagro where he played 126 games, scoring 21 goals. In 1990, he joined Servette of Switzerland. He has also played for Independiente and Estudiantes de La Plata in the Argentine Primera and Avispa Fukuoka in the J-League under manager Hugo Maradona.

Towards the end of his playing career he played for Grupo Universitario de Tandil before returning to his first club Club Atlético Temperley in 1997.

He represented Argentina at the 1988 Olympic games and played for the senior Argentina national team on six occasions including games at Copa América 1987.

After retiring as a footballer he has worked in various roles including football agent, coach and sporting director.
