= Noh Soo-jin =

South Korean footballer (born 1962)

Personal information
- Date of birth: 10 February 1962 (age 64)
- Place of birth: South Korea
- Height: 1.77 m (5 ft 10 in)
- Positions: Forward; midfielder

Senior career*
Years	Team	Apps	(Gls)
1986–1993	Yukong Elephants	127	(39)

International career
1985–1989	South Korea B		
1985–1990	South Korea	27	(5)
Medal record
Representing South Korea
Men's football
Asian Games
Gold medal – first place	1986 Seoul
AFC Asian Cup
Runner-up	1988 Qatar
- * Club domestic league appearances and goals

- Korean name
- Hangul: 노수진
- Hanja: 魯壽珍
- RR: No Sujin
- MR: No Sujin

Noh Soo-jin (Korean: 노수진, born on 10 February 1962) is a former South Korean footballer. A forward or midfielder, he was a part of the South Korea national team at the 1986 and 1990 FIFA World Cups as well as the 1988 Summer Olympics and the 1988 AFC Asian Cup. At the club side, he won the 1989 K League with Yukong Elephants. After his retirement as a player, he worked at the football club of Yeongdeungpo Technical High School as a coach from 1993 to 2003 and a manager from 2005 to 2013.

== Career statistics ==
=== Club ===
Appearances and goals by club, season and competition
Club	Season	League			League cup		Total	
Club	Season	Division	Apps	Goals	Apps	Goals	Apps	Goals
Yukong Elephants	1986	K League	10	3	3	1	13	4
Yukong Elephants	1987	K League	30	12	—		30	12
Yukong Elephants	1988	K League	10	2	—		10	2
Yukong Elephants	1989	K League	30	16	—		30	16
Yukong Elephants	1990	K League	13	1	—		13	1
Yukong Elephants	1991	K League	20	5	—		20	5
Yukong Elephants	1992	K League	13	0	6	5	19	5
Yukong Elephants	1993	K League	1	0	0	0	1	0
Career total			127	39	9	6	136	45

=== International ===
Results list South Korea's goal tally first.

List of international goals scored by Noh Soo-jin
No.	Date	Venue	Opponent	Score	Result	Competition
1	20 September 1986	Busan, South Korea	India	1–0	3–0	1986 Asian Games
2	14 June 1987	Daejeon, South Korea	Thailand	1–0	4–2	1987 Korea Cup
3	25 May 1989	Seoul, South Korea	Nepal	6–0	9–0	1990 FIFA World Cup qualification
4	7 June 1989	Singapore	Singapore	2–0	3–0	1990 FIFA World Cup qualification
5	7 June 1989	Singapore	Singapore	3–0	3–0	1990 FIFA World Cup qualification

== Honours ==
Yukong Elephants

- K League 1: 1989

South Korea

- Asian Games: 1986
- Afro-Asian Cup of Nations: 1987
- AFC Asian Cup runner-up: 1988

Individual

- K League 1 Best XI: 1987, 1989
- K League 1 Most Valuable Player: 1989
- K League All-Star: 1991, 1992
- Korean League Cup top goalscorer: 1992
