= Kim Sam-soo =

South Korean footballer (born 1963)

Personal information
- Date of birth: 8 February 1963 (age 63)
- Place of birth: Daejeon, South Korea
- Height: 1.71 m (5 ft 7 1/2 in)
- Position: Midfielder

Senior career*
Years	Team	Apps	(Gls)
1986–1988	Hyundai Horang-i	52	(4)
1989–1993	Lucky-Goldstar Hwangso	97	(3)
1994	Daewoo Royals	19	(1)
Total		168	(8)

International career
1981	South Korea U-20		
1984–1988	South Korea		

Managerial career
- 1997–2002: Daejeon Citizen (Coach)
- 2010: Cheonan FC
- * Club domestic league appearances and goals

- Kim Sam-soo
- Hangul: 김삼수
- RR: Gim Samsu
- MR: Kim Samsu

Kim Sam-soo (born 8 February 1963) is a South Korean football midfielder who played for South Korea in the 1986 FIFA World Cup. He also played for Hyundai Horang-i and Lucky-Goldstar Hwangso.
