= Carlos Alfaro Moreno =

Argentine footballer (born 1964)

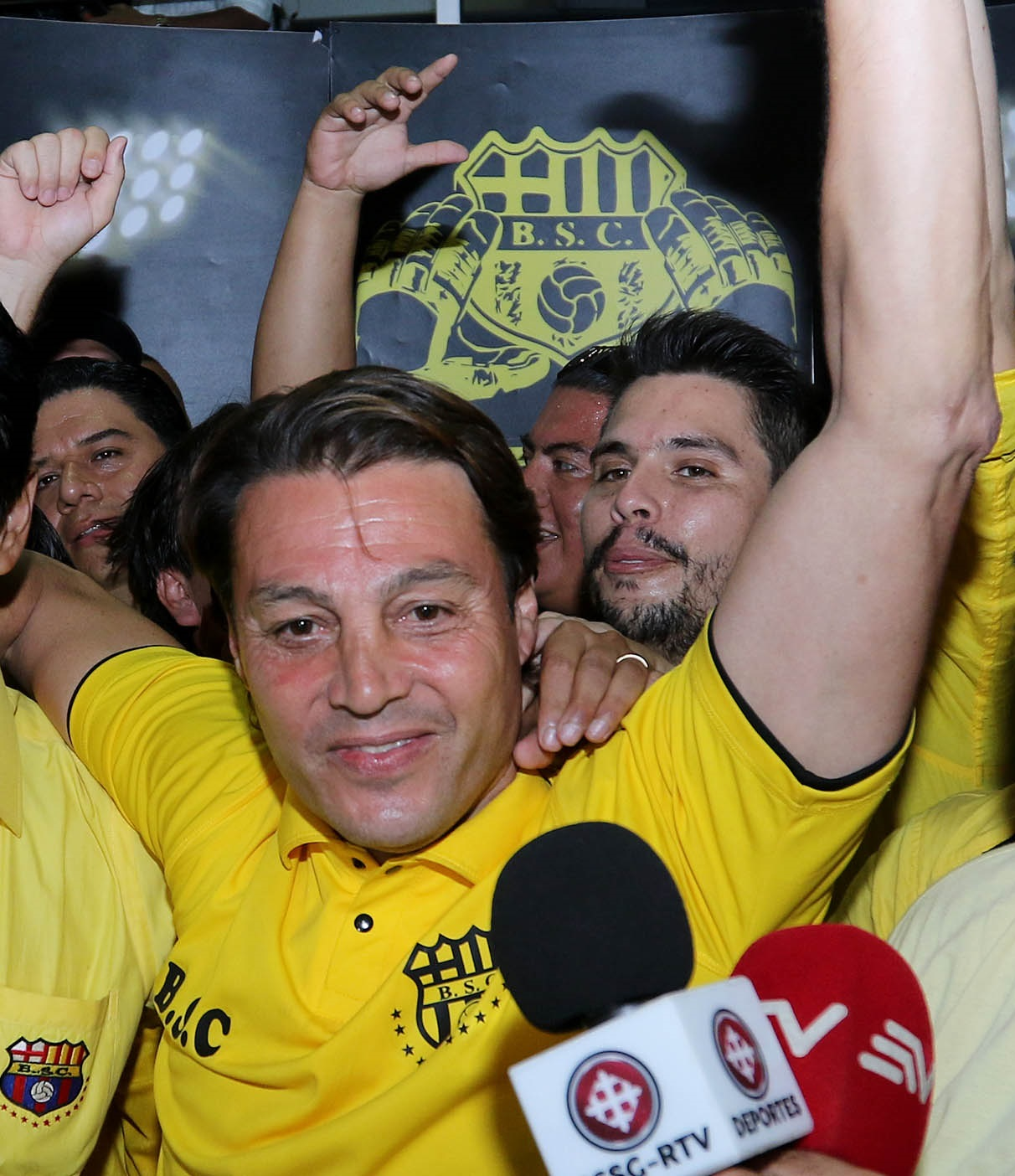

Personal information
- Full name: Carlos Alejandro Alfaro Moreno
- Date of birth: 18 October 1964 (age 62)
- Place of birth: Buenos Aires, Argentina
- Height: 1.76 m (5 ft 9 in)
- Position: Striker

Senior career*
Years	Team	Apps	(Gls)
1983–1988	Platense	134	(31)
1988–1991	Independiente	100	(38)
1991–1992	Espanyol	14	(0)
1992–1993	Palamós	28	(4)
1993–1994	Independiente	14	(6)
1994–1997	Barcelona SC	105	(28)
1997	América	13	(2)
1998	Atlante	16	(6)
1998–2000	Barcelona SC	30	(19)
2000	Ferro Carril Oeste	15	(1)
2001–2002	Barcelona SC	47	(17)

International career
1989–1991	Argentina	11	(2)
- * Club domestic league appearances and goals as of 14 October 2007

Carlos Alejandro Alfaro Moreno (born 18 October 1964 in Buenos Aires) is an Argentine former footballer who played as a striker. He played club football in Argentina, Spain, Ecuador and Mexico as well as representing the Argentina national football team.

== Club career ==
Alfaro Moreno started his career in 1983 with Club Atlético Platense, in 1988 he moved to Club Atlético Independiente where he played an important part in their championship winning campaign in 1988–89. He was awarded the 1989 Player of the Year of Argentina.

In 1991 Alfaro Moreno moved to Spain to play for Espanyol his time with the club was unsuccessful and he moved to Palamós also of Spain.

In 1993, he returned to Independiente, before moving on to join Barcelona Sporting Club in Ecuador. Alfaro Moreno helped the club to win the Ecuadorian championship in 1995 and in 1997. Part way through the 1997 season Alfaro Moreno was sold to Mexican team Club América, he then had a spell with Atlante before returning to Barcelona.

In 2000 Alfaro Moreno returned to Argentina to play for Ferro Carril Oeste but he only stayed for the Apertura 2000 tournament before returning to Barcelona for a third spell with the club before his retirement in 2002.

== International career ==
Between 1989 and 1991 Alfaro Moreno played 11 games for the Argentina national football team scoring 2 goals.

== After football ==
After retirement Alfaro Moreno has gone into coaching and youth development, running his own soccer school in Guayaquil called the Academia de Fútbol Alfaro Moreno.

== Honours ==
Independiente

- Primera División Argentina: 1988–89

Barcelona Sporting Club

- Ecuadorian championship: 1995, 1997
