= Choi Sang-kook =

South Korean footballer and manager

Choi Sang-Kook 최상국
Personal information
- Full name: Choi Sang-Kook
- Date of birth: February 15, 1961 (age 65)
- Place of birth: Chungju, Chungbuk, South Korea
- Position: Forward

Team information
- Current team: Seoul United FC

Senior career*
Years	Team	Apps	(Gls)
1983–1991	POSCO Atoms	149	(31)

International career^{‡}
1983–1989	South Korea	16	(8)

Managerial career
- 1992–2003: Cheongju University
- 2004–2013: Howon University
- 2014–present: Seoul United FC
- * Club domestic league appearances and goals as of 17 December 2014 ‡ National team caps and goals as of 18 November 2008

Choi Sang-Kook (born February 15, 1961) is a South Korea football manager and former footballer who plays as a forward. He played only for POSCO Atoms.

== Club career ==
Choi Sang-Kook was the top scorer in the 1987 K-League season and he was also the top assister. He broke Piyapong Piew-on's record in the 1985 K-League season. He is the last man that was the top scorer and assister in the same season.

== International career ==
He was part of the South Korea national football team. He played at 1984 AFC Asian Cup, 1986 Asian Games, 1988 Summer Olympics and many of South Korea's matches. He played at the 1990 FIFA World Cup qualification, but he failed to join the final squad.

== Career statistics ==
=== Club ===
All-Time Club Performance
Club	Season	League			League Cup			AFC Champions League			Total
Club	Season	Apps	Goals	Assts	Apps	Goals	Assts	Apps	Goals	Assts	Apps	Goals	Assts
POSCO Atoms	1983	16	2	4	-	-	-	-	-	-	16	2	4
POSCO Atoms	1984	23	4	1	-	-	-	-	-	-	23	4	1
POSCO Atoms	1985	20	2	2	-	-	-	-	-	-	20	2	2
POSCO Atoms	1986	9	1	3	10	1	1	-	-	-	19	2	4
POSCO Atoms	1987	30	15	8	-	-	-	-	-	-	30	15	8
POSCO Atoms	1988	11	2	1	-	-	-	-	-	-	11	2	1
POSCO Atoms	1989	8	2	0	-	-	-	-	-	-	8	2	0
POSCO Atoms	1990	19	3	0	-	-	-	-	-	-	19	3	0
POSCO Atoms	1991	13	0	2	-	-	-	-	-	-	13	0	2
POSCO Atoms	Total	149	31	21	10	1	1	-	-	-	159	32	22
Career totals		149	31	21	10	1	1	-	-	-	159	32	22

=== International goals ===
Results list South Korea's goal tally first.

Date	Venue	Opponent	Score	Result	Competition
October 4, 1984	Seoul	Cameroon	3 goals	5-0	Olympic Stadium opening anniversary
October 13, 1984	Calcutta	Pakistan	1 goal	6-0	1984 AFC Asian Cup qualification
June 12, 1987	Busan	United States	1 goal	1-0	1987 President's Cup
December 17, 1987	Kuala Lumpur	Malaysia	1 goal	1-0	1987 Merdeka Cup
May 25, 1989	Seoul	Nepal	2 goals	9-0	1990 FIFA World Cup qualification
