= South Korea national football team results (1990–1999) =

- Win Draw Loss

This is a list of football games played by the South Korea national football team between 1990 and 1999.

== Results by year ==
Year	Pld	W	D	L	Win %
1990	21	12	3	6	57.14
1991	6	3	3	0	50.00
1992	5	1	4	0	20.00
1993	21	11	6	4	52.38
1994	20	7	6	7	35.00
1995	9	2	4	3	22.22
1996	16	8	3	5	50.00
1997	23	15	5	3	65.22
1998	25	10	8	7	40.00
1999	5	1	3	1	20.00
Total	151	70	45	36	46.36

== Matches ==
=== 1990 ===
4 February 1990 Malta International Football Tournament	South Korea	2–3	Norway	Ta' Qali, Malta
	Hwang Sun-hong 36'; Lee Sang-yoon 58'		Berg 53'; Skammelsrud 87'; Tangen 89'

10 February 1990 Malta International Football Tournament	Malta	1–2	South Korea	Ta' Qali, Malta
	Laferla 83'		Baek Jong-chul 39'; Hwangbo Kwan 75'

15 February Friendly	Iraq	0–0	South Korea	Baghdad, Iraq

18 February Friendly	Egypt	0–0	South Korea	Cairo, Egypt

12 June 1990 FIFA World Cup (Group E)	South Korea	0–2	Belgium	Verona, Italy
			Degryse 53'; De Wolf 64'

17 June 1990 FIFA World Cup (Group E)	South Korea	1–3	Spain	Udine, Italy
	Hwangbo Kwan 42'		Míchel 22', 61', 81'

21 June 1990 FIFA World Cup (Group E)	South Korea	0–1	Uruguay	Udine, Italy
			Fonseca 90'

27 July 1990 Dynasty Cup	South Korea	2–0	Japan	Beijing, China
	Hwang Sun-hong 34'; Kim Joo-sung 66'

29 July 1990 Dynasty Cup	South Korea	1–0	North Korea	Beijing, China
	Hwangbo Kwan 89'

31 July 1990 Dynasty Cup	China	0–1	South Korea	Beijing, China
			Lee Sang-yoon 26'

3 August 1990 Dynasty Cup	China	1–1 (a.e.t.) (4–5 p)	South Korea	Beijing, China
	Mai Chao 61'		Hong Myung-bo 22' (pen.)
	Penalties
	Zhu Bo (penalty scored); Li Hongbing (penalty missed); Wu Qunli (penalty scored); Xie Yuxin (penalty missed); Ma Lin (penalty scored); Guo Yijun (penalty missed)		(penalty missed) Lee Sang-yoon; (penalty scored) Hong Myung-bo; (penalty scored) Choi Soon-ho; (penalty scored) Lee Young-jin; (penalty missed) Park Kyung-hoon; (penalty scored) Chung Yong-hwan; (penalty scored) Choi In-young

6 September Friendly	South Korea	1–0	Australia	Seoul, South Korea
	Byun Byung-joo 19'

9 September Friendly	South Korea	1–0	Australia	Busan, South Korea
	Seo Jung-won 82'

23 September 1990 Asian Games (Group A)	South Korea	7–0	Singapore	Beijing, China
	Hong Myung-bo 10' (pen.); Kim Joo-sung 48', 59'; Ko Jeong-woon 51', 61'; Seo Jung-won 58', 62'

25 September 1990 Asian Games (Group A)	South Korea	7–0	Pakistan	Beijing, China
	Hwang Sun-hong 22', 41', 82'; Kim Sang-ho 47', 51'; Chung Jong-soo 58'; Noh Jung-yoon 77'

27 September 1990 Asian Games (Group A)	China	0–2	South Korea	Beijing, China
			Seo Jung-won 57', 75'

1 October 1990 Asian Games (Quarter-finals)	South Korea	1–0	Kuwait	Beijing, China
	Gu Sang-bum 59'

3 October 1990 Asian Games (Semi-finals)	South Korea	0–1 (a.e.t.)	Iran	Beijing, China
		Report	Ghayeghran 108'

5 October 1990 Asian Games (Bronze medal match)	South Korea	1–0	Thailand	Beijing, China
	Hwangbo Kwan 51'

11 October Friendly	North Korea	2–1	South Korea	Pyongyang, North Korea
	Yun Jong-su 49'; Tak Young-bin 90'		Kim Joo-sung 25'

23 October Friendly	South Korea	1–0	North Korea	Seoul, South Korea
	Hwang Sun-hong 25'

=== 1991 ===
7 June 1991 Korea Cup	South Korea	0–0	Egypt	Seoul, South Korea

9 June 1991 Korea Cup	South Korea	3–0	Indonesia	Daejeon, South Korea
	Ko Jeong-woon 52'; Kim Joo-sung 55'; Ha Seok-ju 82' (pen.)

11 June 1991 Korea Cup	South Korea	1–1	Malta	Gwangju, South Korea
	Ha Seok-ju 73'		Suda 89'

14 June 1991 Korea Cup	South Korea	0–0 (a.e.t.) (4–3 p)	Australia	Seoul, South Korea
	Penalties
	Ha Seok-ju (penalty scored); Choi Dae-shik (penalty scored); Yoon Deok-yeo (penalty missed); Ko Jeong-woon (penalty scored); Choi Kang-hee (penalty scored)		(penalty scored) Wade; (penalty missed) Arnold; (penalty scored) Blagojevic; (penalty scored) Milosevic; (penalty missed) Vidmar

16 June 1991 Korea Cup	South Korea	2–0	Egypt	Seoul, South Korea
	Ha Seok-ju 41', 89' (pen.)

27 July Japan–Korea Regular Match	Japan	0–1	South Korea	Nagasaki, Japan
			Ha Seok-ju 62'

=== 1992 ===
22 August 1992 Dynasty Cup	South Korea	0–0	Japan	Beijing, China

24 August 1992 Dynasty Cup	South Korea	1–1	North Korea	Beijing, China
	Hong Myung-bo 22'	Report	Choi Yong-son 89'

26 August 1992 Dynasty Cup	China	0–2	South Korea	Beijing, China
			Park Hyun-yong 19'; Jung Jae-kwon 73'

29 August 1992 Dynasty Cup	South Korea	2–2 (a.e.t.) (2–4 p)	Japan	Beijing, China
	Jung Jae-kwon 32'; Kim Jung-hyuk 97'		Nakayama 82'; Takagi 96'
	Penalties
	Kim Jung-hyuk (penalty scored); Choi Kang-hee (penalty missed); Ko Jeong-woon (penalty missed); Lee Sang-yoon (penalty scored)		(penalty scored) Hashiratani; (penalty scored) Ihara; (penalty scored) Miura; (penalty scored) Kitazawa

21 October Friendly	South Korea	0–0	United Arab Emirates	Anyang, South Korea

=== 1993 ===
9 March Friendly	Canada	0–2	South Korea	Coquitlam, Canada
			Kim Tae-young 18'; Kim Hyun-seok 87'

11 March Friendly	Canada	2–0	South Korea	Victoria, Canada
	Catliff 20'; Berdusco 70'

25 April Friendly	South Korea	1–1	Iraq	Changwon, South Korea
	Gu Sang-bum 89'		A. Radhi 50'

28 April Friendly	South Korea	2–2	Iraq	Ulsan, South Korea
	Ha Seok-ju 26'; Seo Jung-won 66'		Abdul-Hameed 38'; Qais 76' (pen.)

9 May 1994 FIFA World Cup (Qualification)	South Korea	0–0	Bahrain	Beirut, Lebanon

11 May 1994 FIFA World Cup (Qualification)	Lebanon	0–1	South Korea	Beirut, Lebanon
			Ha Seok-ju 17'

13 May 1994 FIFA World Cup (Qualification)	South Korea	3–0	India	Beirut, Lebanon
	Hong Myung-bo 19' (pen.); Choi Moon-sik 70'; Ha Seok-ju 89'

15 May 1994 FIFA World Cup (Qualification)	South Korea	3–0	Hong Kong	Beirut, Lebanon
	Ha Seok-ju 21'; Seo Jung-won 50'; Choi Moon-sik 73'

5 June 1994 FIFA World Cup (Qualification)	South Korea	4–1	Hong Kong	Seoul, South Korea
	Choi Moon-sik 12'; Jung Jae-kwon 76'; Ha Seok-ju 81'; Noh Jung-yoon 85'		Au Wai-lun 21'

7 June 1994 FIFA World Cup (Qualification)	South Korea	2–0	Lebanon	Seoul, South Korea
	Ha Seok-ju 31'; Hwangbo Kwan 56'

9 June 1994 FIFA World Cup (Qualification)	South Korea	7–0	India	Seoul, South Korea
	Lee Ki-beom 4', 23', 50'; Kim Tae-young 37', 69'; Park Jung-bae 39'; Ha Seok-ju 66' (pen.)

13 June 1994 FIFA World Cup (Qualification)	South Korea	3–0	Bahrain	Seoul, South Korea
	Kang Chul 15'; Park Nam-yeol 63'; Gu Sang-bum 84'

19 June 1993 Korea Cup	South Korea	1–2	Egypt	Seoul, South Korea
	Seo Jung-won 55'		Ezzat 22', 54'

28 June 1993 Korea Cup	South Korea	0–1	Egypt	Seoul, South Korea
			Reda 86'

24 September Friendly	South Korea	1–1	Australia	Seoul, South Korea
	Seo Jung-won 35'		Mori 85'

26 September Friendly	South Korea	1–0	Australia	Seoul, South Korea
	Choi Moon-sik 75'

16 October 1994 FIFA World Cup (Qualification)	South Korea	3–0	Iran	Doha, Qatar
	Park Jung-bae 18'; Ha Seok-ju 79'; Ko Jeong-woon 81'

19 October 1994 FIFA World Cup (Qualification)	South Korea	2–2	Iraq	Doha, Qatar
	Kim Pan-keun 40'; Hong Myung-bo 66'		Hussein 31'; Jafar 85'

22 October 1994 FIFA World Cup (Qualification)	South Korea	1–1	Saudi Arabia	Doha, Qatar
	Shin Hong-gi 63'		Jamil 90'

25 October 1994 FIFA World Cup (Qualification)	South Korea	0–1	Japan	Doha, Qatar
			Miura 60'

28 October 1994 FIFA World Cup (Qualification)	South Korea	3–0	North Korea	Doha, Qatar
	Ko Jeong-woon 49'; Hwang Sun-hong 53'; Ha Seok-ju 75'

=== 1994 ===
16 February Friendly	South Korea	1–2	Romania	Changwon, South Korea
	Shin Hong-gi 19'		Dumitrescu 44', 73'

26 February Friendly	South Korea	2–2	Colombia	Los Angeles, United States
	Kim Pan-keun 55'; Hwang Sun-hong 66'		Escobar 73'; Aristizábal 85'

5 March Friendly	United States	1–0	South Korea	Los Angeles, United States
	Reyna 83'

12 March Friendly	United States	1–1	South Korea	Los Angeles, United States
	Armstrong 31'		Balboa 63' (o.g.)

1 May Friendly	South Korea	2–2	Cameroon	Seoul, South Korea
	Kim Hyun-seok 84'; Cho Jin-ho 90'		Libiih 27'; Kalla 89'

4 May Friendly	South Korea	2–1	Cameroon	Changwon, South Korea
	Cho Jin-ho 18'; Hwang Sun-hong 79'		Mouyémé 44'

5 June Friendly	South Korea	1–2	Ecuador	Boston, United States
	Hong Myung-bo 60'		Vernaza 34'; Ron 77' (pen.)

11 June Friendly	South Korea	3–0	Honduras	Dallas, United States
	Ko Jeong-woon 7'; Hwang Sun-hong 37'; Kim Joo-sung 78'

17 June 1994 FIFA World Cup (Group C)	South Korea	2–2	Spain	Dallas, United States
	Hong Myung-bo 85'; Seo Jung-won 90'		Salinas 51'; Goikoetxea 55'

23 June 1994 FIFA World Cup (Group C)	South Korea	0–0	Bolivia	Boston, United States

27 June 1994 FIFA World Cup (Group C)	South Korea	2–3	Germany	Dallas, United States
	Hwang Sun-hong 52'; Hong Myung-bo 63'		Klinsmann 12', 37'; Riedle 20'

11 September Friendly	South Korea	1–0	Ukraine	Gangneung, South Korea
	Hong Myung-bo 84'

13 September Friendly	South Korea	2–0	Ukraine	Seoul, South Korea
	Kim Do-hoon 64'; Hwang Sun-hong 85'

19 September Friendly	South Korea	0–0	United Arab Emirates	Seoul, South Korea

1 October 1994 Asian Games (Group C)	South Korea	11–0	Nepal	Onomichi, Japan
	Ha Seok-ju 9', 55'; Hwang Sun-hong 15', 21', 29', 39', 43', 64', 82', 86'; Ko Jeong-woon 35'

5 October 1994 Asian Games (Group C)	South Korea	2–1	Oman	Hiroshima, Japan
	Humaid 12' (o.g.); Hwang Sun-hong 48'		Abdulnoor 82'

7 October 1994 Asian Games (Group C)	South Korea	0–1	Kuwait	Miyoshi, Japan
			Salboukh 70'

11 October 1994 Asian Games (Quarter-finals)	Japan	2–3	South Korea	Hiroshima, Japan
	Miura 30'; Ihara 86'		Yoo Sang-chul 51'; Hwang Sun-hong 77', 89' (pen.)

13 October 1994 Asian Games (Semi-finals)	South Korea	0–1	Uzbekistan	Hiroshima, Japan
			Abduraimov 64'

15 October 1994 Asian Games (Bronze medal match)	South Korea	1–2	Kuwait	Hiroshima, Japan
	Seo Jung-won 4'		Sulaiman 8'; Al-Ahmad 18'

=== 1995 ===
31 January 1995 Lunar New Year Cup	South Korea	1–0	Colombia	Hong Kong
	Choi Yong-soo 51'

6 February 1995 Lunar New Year Cup	South Korea	0–1	FR Yugoslavia	Hong Kong
			Kovačević 49'

19 February 1995 Dynasty Cup	South Korea	0–0	China	Hong Kong

21 February 1995 Dynasty Cup	South Korea	1–1	Japan	Hong Kong
	Lee Woo-young 67'		Kurosaki 47'

26 February 1995 Dynasty Cup	South Korea	2–2 (a.e.t.) (3–5 p)	Japan	Hong Kong
	Lee Ki-hyung 26', 90'		Fukuda 2'; Yamaguchi 87'
	Penalties
	Yoo Sang-chul (penalty scored); Choi Yong-soo (penalty missed); Lee Ki-hyung (penalty scored); Choi Sung-yong (penalty scored)		(penalty scored) Hashiratani; (penalty scored) Kitazawa; (penalty scored) Fukuda; (penalty scored) Moriyasu; (penalty scored) Ihara

5 June 1995 Korea Cup	South Korea	1–0	Costa Rica	Suwon, South Korea
	Kim Do-hoon 78'

10 June 1995 Korea Cup	South Korea	2–3	Zambia	Seoul, South Korea
	Roh Sang-rae 41'; Kim Do-hoon 61'		Mulenga 10'; Lota 51'; Mutale 79'

12 August Friendly	South Korea	0–1	Brazil	Suwon, South Korea
			Dunga 34'

31 October Friendly	South Korea	1–1	Saudi Arabia	Seoul, South Korea
	Hwang Sun-hong 64'		Anwar 85'

=== 1996 ===
13 March Friendly	Croatia	3–0	South Korea	Zagreb, Croatia
	Vlaović 24', 43', 63'

19 March Dubai Tournament	United Arab Emirates	3–2	South Korea	Dubai, United Arab Emirates
	Al-Haddad 48'; Bakheet 51'; Al-Talyani 56'		Kim Do-hoon 23'; Hwang Sun-hong 63'

23 March Dubai Tournament	South Korea	2–2	Morocco	Dubai, United Arab Emirates
	Ko Jeong-woon 23'; Roh Sang-rae 61'		Fahmi 35'; Nazir 37'

25 March Dubai Tournament	South Korea	1–1	Egypt	Dubai, United Arab Emirates
	Roh Sang-rae 88'		Abdel Moneim 87'

30 April Friendly	Israel	4–5	South Korea	Tel Aviv, Israel
	Revivo 78', 87'; Banin 80'; Zohar 90'		Kim Do-hoon 4'; Yoo Sang-chul 37'; Shin Tae-yong 39'; Hwang Sun-hong 54', 56' (pen.)

16 May Friendly	South Korea	0–2	Sweden	Seoul, South Korea
			Dahlin 12'; Limpar 58'

5 August 1996 AFC Asian Cup (Qualification)	South Korea	9–0	Guam	Ho Chi Minh City, Vietnam
	Park Tae-ha 2', 4', 40'; Kim Hyun-seok 5', 36', 55'; Kim Do-hoon 19'; Seo Hyo-won 52'; Choi Moon-sik 85'

8 August 1996 AFC Asian Cup (Qualification)	South Korea	4–0	Chinese Taipei	Ho Chi Minh City, Vietnam
	Hong Myung-bo 9'; Kim Do-hoon 19'; Park Tae-ha 48', 70'

11 August 1996 AFC Asian Cup (Qualification)	Vietnam	0–4	South Korea	Ho Chi Minh City, Vietnam
			Shin Tae-yong 1'; Roh Sang-rae 8'; Park Tae-ha 17'; Seo Hyo-won 83'

25 September Friendly	South Korea	3–1	China	Seoul, South Korea
	Seo Jung-won 15'; Lee Ki-hyung 30'; Ha Seok-ju 64'		Hao Haidong 10'

23 November Friendly	South Korea	4–1	Colombia	Suwon, South Korea
	Hwang Sun-hong 51', 62'; Kim Do-hoon 75'; Park Tae-ha 87'		Villa 70'

26 November Friendly	China	2–3	South Korea	Guangzhou, China
	Hao Haidong 51'; Li Bing 84' (pen.)		Roh Sang-rae 7' (pen.); Lee Young-jin 56'; Shin Hong-gi 71'

4 December 1996 AFC Asian Cup (Group A)	United Arab Emirates	1–1	South Korea	Dubai, United Arab Emirates
	Khamis 40'		Hwang Sun-hong 9'

7 December 1996 AFC Asian Cup (Group A)	South Korea	4–2	Indonesia	Dubai, United Arab Emirates
	Kim Do-hoon 5'; Hwang Sun-hong 7', 15'; Ko Jeong-woon 64'		Wabia 57'; Wewengkang 65'

10 December 1996 AFC Asian Cup (Group A)	South Korea	0–2	Kuwait	Dubai, United Arab Emirates
			Al-Huwaidi 59'; B. Abdullah 87'

16 December 1996 AFC Asian Cup (Quarter-finals)	South Korea	2–6	Iran	Abu Dhabi, United Arab Emirates
	Kim Do-hoon 11'; Shin Tae-yong 34'		Bagheri 30'; Azizi 51'; Daei 56', 66', 83', 89'

=== 1997 ===
18 January 4 Nations Tournament	South Korea	1–0	Norway	Melbourne, Australia
	Kim Do-hoon 57'

22 January 4 Nations Tournament	Australia	2–1	South Korea	Brisbane, Australia
	Bingley 36'; Edwards 72'		Ha Seok-ju 75'

25 January 4 Nations Tournament	South Korea	3–1	New Zealand	Sydney, Australia
	Park Kun-ha 76'; Ko Jong-soo 82'; Yoo Sang-chul 85'		Coveny 33'

22 February 1998 FIFA World Cup (Qualification)	Hong Kong	0–2	South Korea	Hong Kong
			Seo Jung-won 61'; Choi Moon-sik 74'

2 March 1998 FIFA World Cup (Qualification)	Thailand	1–3	South Korea	Bangkok, Thailand
	Piyapong 48'		Roh Sang-rae 18'; Ha Seok-ju 73'; Choi Moon-sik 86'

23 April China–Korea Regular Match	China	0–2	South Korea	Beijing, China
			Park Kun-ha 45', 57'

21 May Friendly	Japan	1–1	South Korea	Tokyo, Japan
	Miura 88' (pen.)		Yoo Sang-chul 56'

28 May 1998 FIFA World Cup (Qualification)	South Korea	4–0	Hong Kong	Daejeon, South Korea
	Yoo Sang-chul 25' (pen.); Choi Yong-soo 39', 72'; Park Kun-ha 86'

1 June 1998 FIFA World Cup (Qualification)	South Korea	0–0	Thailand	Seoul, South Korea

12 June 1997 Korea Cup	South Korea	3–1	Egypt	Seoul, South Korea
	Park Kun-ha 12'; Yoo Sang-chul 65'; Choi Moon-sik 77'		Khashaba 23'

14 June 1997 Korea Cup	South Korea	3–0	Ghana	Suwon, South Korea
	Seo Jung-won 5'; Choi Yong-soo 49'; Choi Moon-sik 54'

16 June 1997 Korea Cup	South Korea	1–1	FR Yugoslavia	Seoul, South Korea
	Seo Jung-won 19'		Jokanović 55'

10 August Friendly	South Korea	1–2	Brazil	Seoul, South Korea
	Kim Do-keun 7'		Ronaldo 83' (pen.); Anderson 90'

24 August Friendly	South Korea	4–1	Tajikistan	Daegu, South Korea
	Kim Do-hoon 3', 34'; Choi Yong-soo 19'; Yoo Sang-chul 65' (pen.)		Tukhtaev 33'

30 August China–Korea Regular Match	South Korea	0–0	China	Seoul, South Korea

6 September 1998 FIFA World Cup (Qualification)	South Korea	3–0	Kazakhstan	Seoul, South Korea
	Choi Yong-soo 24', 67', 74'

12 September 1998 FIFA World Cup (Qualification)	South Korea	2–1	Uzbekistan	Seoul, South Korea
	Choi Yong-soo 15'; Lee Sang-yoon 87'		Shatskikh 74'

28 September 1998 FIFA World Cup (Qualification)	Japan	1–2	South Korea	Tokyo, Japan
	Yamaguchi 65'		Seo Jung-won 83'; Lee Min-sung 86'

4 October 1998 FIFA World Cup (Qualification)	South Korea	3–0	United Arab Emirates	Seoul, South Korea
	Ha Seok-ju 7'; Yoo Sang-chul 67' (pen.); Lee Sang-yoon 80'

11 October 1998 FIFA World Cup (Qualification)	Kazakhstan	1–1	South Korea	Almaty, Kazakhstan
	Yevteyev 51'		Choi Yong-soo 4'

18 October 1998 FIFA World Cup (Qualification)	Uzbekistan	1–5	South Korea	Tashkent, Uzbekistan
	Fyodorov 65' (pen.)		Choi Yong-soo 18', 41'; Yoo Sang-chul 38'; Ko Jeong-woon 57'; Kim Do-hoon 70'

1 November 1998 FIFA World Cup (Qualification)	South Korea	0–2	Japan	Seoul, South Korea
			Nanami 1'; Lopes 37'

9 November 1998 FIFA World Cup (Qualification)	United Arab Emirates	1–3	South Korea	Abu Dhabi, United Arab Emirates
	Bakheet 51'		Lee Sang-yoon 9'; Kim Do-hoon 42', 66'

=== 1998 ===
27 January 1998 King's Cup	South Korea	2–0	Egypt	Bangkok, Thailand
	Choi Yong-soo 6'; Lee Sang-yoon 42'

29 January 1998 King's Cup	Thailand	0–2	South Korea	Bangkok, Thailand
			Ko Jong-soo 52'; Choi Yong-soo 63'

31 January 1998 King's Cup	South Korea	1–1 (a.e.t.) (5–4 p)	Egypt	Bangkok, Thailand
	Choi Yong-soo 48'		H. Hassan 1'

7 February Friendly	New Zealand	0–1	South Korea	Auckland, New Zealand
			Choi Yong-soo 1'

11 February Friendly	Australia	1–0	South Korea	Sydney, Australia
	Tapai 38'

1 March 1998 Dynasty Cup	Japan	2–1	South Korea	Yokohama, Japan
	Nakayama 17'; Jo 88'		Lee Sang-yoon 21'

4 March 1998 Dynasty Cup	South Korea	2–1	China	Yokohama, Japan
	Choi Sung-yong 38'; Lee Sang-yoon 42'		Li Bing 15'

1 April Friendly	South Korea	2–1	Japan	Seoul, South Korea
	Lee Sang-yoon 40'; Hwang Sun-hong 72'		Nakayama 61'

15 April Friendly	Slovakia	0–0	South Korea	Bratislava, Slovakia

18 April Friendly	Macedonia	2–2	South Korea	Skopje, Macedonia
	Hristov 56'; Gjuzelov 88'		Jang Hyung-seok 24'; Choi Yong-soo 85'

22 April Friendly	FR Yugoslavia	3–1	South Korea	Zagreb, FR Yugoslavia
	Stanković 47', 57'; Jokanović 63'		Hwang Sun-hong 15'

16 May Friendly	South Korea	2–1	Jamaica	Seoul, South Korea
	Lee Sang-yoon 35', 50'		Powell 41'

19 May Friendly	South Korea	0–0	Jamaica	Seoul, South Korea

27 May Friendly	South Korea	2–2	Czech Republic	Seoul, South Korea
	Hwang Sun-hong 56'; Choi Yong-soo 81'		Němec 17'; Lokvenc 31'

4 June China–Korea Regular Match	South Korea	1–1	China	Seoul, South Korea
	Lee Sang-yoon 16'		Ma Mingyu 51'

13 June 1998 FIFA World Cup (Group E)	South Korea	1–3	Mexico	Lyon, France
	Ha Seok-ju 28'		Peláez 51'; Hernández 74', 84'

20 June 1998 FIFA World Cup (Group E)	South Korea	0–5	Netherlands	Marseille, France
			Cocu 38'; Overmars 42'; Bergkamp 71'; Van Hooijdonk 80'; De Boer 83'

25 June 1998 FIFA World Cup (Group E)	South Korea	1–1	Belgium	Paris, France
	Yoo Sang-chul 71'		Nilis 7'

22 November China–Korea Regular Match	China	0–0	South Korea	Shanghai, China

2 December 1998 Asian Games (Preliminary Group A)	South Korea	2–3	Turkmenistan	Bangkok, Thailand
	Choi Yong-soo 1', 44'		Choi Yoon-yeol 59' (o.g.); Agaýew 85'; Kislov 88'

4 December 1998 Asian Games (Preliminary Group A)	South Korea	4–0	Vietnam	Bangkok, Thailand
	Kim Eun-jung 30'; Choi Yong-soo 42', 86'; Yoon Jung-hwan 66'

7 December 1998 Asian Games (Group B)	South Korea	2–0	Japan	Bangkok, Thailand
	Choi Yong-soo 31' (pen.), 46'

9 December 1998 Asian Games (Group B)	South Korea	2–1	United Arab Emirates	Bangkok, Thailand
	Yoon Jung-hwan 37'; Yoo Sang-chul 55' (pen.)		Al-Bloushi 62'

11 December 1998 Asian Games (Group B)	South Korea	1–0	Kuwait	Bangkok, Thailand
	Choi Yong-soo 58'

14 December 1998 Asian Games (Quarter-finals)	Thailand	2–1 (a.e.t.)	South Korea	Bangkok, Thailand
	Kiatisuk 81'; Thawatchai 95'		Yoo Sang-chul 86'

=== 1999 ===
28 March Friendly	South Korea	1–0	Brazil	Seoul, South Korea
	Kim Do-hoon 90'

5 June Friendly	South Korea	1–2	Belgium	Seoul, South Korea
	Ko Jong-soo 89' (pen.)		Martens 23', 31'

12 June 1999 Korea Cup	South Korea	1–1	Mexico	Seoul, South Korea
	Ahn Jung-hwan 16'		Terrazas 14'

15 June 1999 Korea Cup	South Korea	0–0	Egypt	Seoul, South Korea

19 June 1999 Korea Cup	South Korea	1–1	Croatia	Seoul, South Korea
	Noh Jung-yoon 58'		Tomas 88'

== See also ==
- South Korea national football team results
- South Korea national football team
