= China–South Korea football rivalry =

International football rivalry

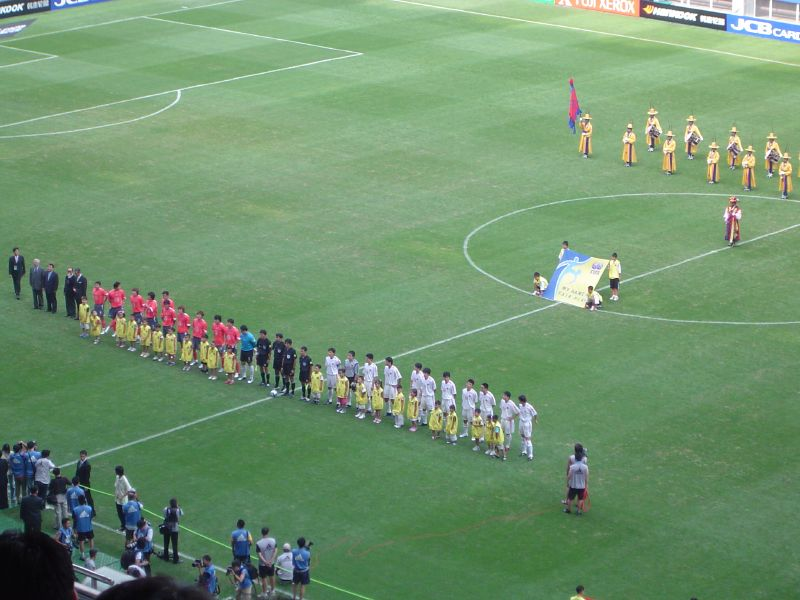
- China vs South Korea at the 2005 East Asian Football Championship
- Other names: Konghanzheng
- Location: Asia (AFC); East Asia (EAFF)
- Teams: China; South Korea
- First meeting: 17 December 1978; Asian Games; South Korea 1–0 China
- Latest meeting: 7 July 2025; EAFF E-1 Football Championship; South Korea 3–0 China

Statistics
- Total meetings: 39
- Top scorer: Lee Tae-ho (4)
- All-time series: China: 2 South Korea: 24; Draw: 13

The China–South Korea football rivalry is a sports rivalry between the men's national association football teams of each country. The rivalry is commonly referred to as Konghanzheng (Chinese: 恐韩症; pinyin: kǒng hán zhèng; lit. 'Fear of Korea Symptom'; Korean: 공한증, romanized: gonghanjeung) or Korea-fearing symptom due to how common it is for the China national team to lose to the South Korea national team. Over the 39 official matches they have played against each other, China has only won twice.

== Overview ==
The term "Konghanzheng" literally means "the symptom of fearing Korea". This term was originally used by the Chinese mass media and was later adopted by the Korean media as well. While this term may be seen as an effort to diminish the achievements of the Korean side, the Chinese media has historically taken a positive attitude acknowledging the Korean team's preeminence among East Asian sides.

In Korea, this term is often used as a general term for national victory, as when Korean baseball fans express a desire to create Koreaphobia among the Japanese. This concept is also paired with the Korean Wave (Hallyu) in Korean discourse regarding their relationship with China and other Asian countries.

Lin Xiaohua, the vice chairman of Chinese Football Association said before the match on 10 February 2010, "Koreaphobia comes from the differences in ability, now that becomes much narrower. Therefore, if the mentality is enhanced, our team can overcome Koreanphobia". He also said that the association will invite psychotherapists for the China national football team to cope with the psychological pressure and defeatism for the future. Immediately after his announcement, China defeated South Korea for the first time in their history.

On 23 March 2017, China defeated South Korea for the first time in an official FIFA competitive match by a score of 1–0 in the 2018 FIFA World Cup qualification tournament.

== Head-to-head record ==
Venue	China wins	South Korea wins	Draws	China goals	South Korea goals
At China home	1	9	2	6	20
At South Korea home	0	6	5	7	17
Neutral venue	1	9	6	13	22
Total	2	24	13	26	59

== Matches ==
No.	Date	Competition	South Korea	Result	China	Venue
1	17 December 1978	1978 Asian Games	Cha Bum-kun 47'	1–0		Bangkok, Thailand
2	29 December 1978	1980 AFC Asian Cup qualification	Huh Jung-moo 13'	1–0		Manila, Philippines
3	1 March 1982	1982 Nehru Cup	Lee Tae-ho 44'	1–1	Shen Xiangfu 80'	Calcutta, India
4	3 November 1983	1984 Summer Olympics qualification	Kim Jong-kun 32', 50'; Kim Jong-boo 34'	3–3	Jia Xiuquan 51'; Liu Haiguang 79', 85'	Bangkok, Thailand
5	8 November 1983	1984 Summer Olympics qualification		0–0		Bangkok, Thailand
6	28 September 1986	1986 Asian Games	Park Chang-sun 19' (pen.); Kim Joo-sung 47'; Lee Tae-ho 74'; Cho Min-kook 76'	4–2	Li Hui 25' (pen.), 79' (pen.)	Seoul, South Korea
7	14 December 1988	1988 AFC Asian Cup	Lee Tae-ho 93', 103'	2–1 (a.e.t.)	Mai Chao 100'	Doha, Qatar
8	20 October 1989	1990 FIFA World Cup qualification	Kim Joo-sung 66'	1–0		Singapore
9	31 July 1990	1990 Dynasty Cup	Lee Sang-yoon 26'	1–0		Beijing, China
10	3 August 1990	1990 Dynasty Cup	Hong Myung-bo 22' (pen.)	1–1 (a.e.t.) (5–4 p)	Mai Chao 61'	Beijing, China
11	27 September 1990	1990 Asian Games	Seo Jung-won 57', 75'	2–0		Beijing, China
12	26 August 1992	1992 Dynasty Cup	Park Hyun-yong 19'; Jung Jae-kwon 73'	2–0		Beijing, China
13	19 February 1995	1995 Dynasty Cup		0–0		Hong Kong
14	25 September 1996	Friendly	Seo Jung-won 15'; Lee Ki-hyung 30'; Ha Seok-ju 64'	3–1	Hao Haidong 10'	Seoul, South Korea
15	26 November 1996	Friendly	Roh Sang-rae 7' (pen.); Lee Young-jin 56'; Shin Hong-gi 71'	3–2	Hao Haidong 51'; Li Bing 84' (pen.)	Guangzhou, China
16	23 April 1997	Friendly	Park Kun-ha 45', 57'	2–0		Beijing, China
17	30 August 1997	Friendly		0–0		Seoul, South Korea
18	4 March 1998	1998 Dynasty Cup	Choi Sung-yong 38'; Lee Sang-Yoon 42'	2–1	Li Bing 15'	Yokohama, Japan
19	4 June 1998	Friendly	Lee Sang-yoon 16'	1–1	Ma Mingyu 51'	Seoul, South Korea
20	22 November 1998	Friendly		0–0		Shanghai, China
21	28 July 2000	Friendly	Lee Young-pyo 52'	1–0		Beijing, China
22	13 October 2000	2000 AFC Asian Cup	Lee Young-pyo 30'; Noh Jung-yoon 58'	2–2	Su Maozhen 36'; Fan Zhiyi 66'	Tripoli, Lebanon
23	29 October 2000	2000 AFC Asian Cup	Lee Dong-gook 76'	1–0		Beirut, Lebanon
24	27 April 2002	Friendly		0–0		Incheon, South Korea
25	7 December 2003	2003 EAFF Championship	Yoo Sang-chul 45+1'	1–0		Saitama, Japan
26	31 July 2005	2005 EAFF Championship	Kim Jin-kyu 73'	1–1	Sun Xiang 52'	Daejon, South Korea
27	17 February 2008	2008 EAFF Championship	Park Chu-young 43', 75'; Kwak Tae-hwi 90+2'	3–2	Zhou Haibin 47'; Liu Jian 61'	Chongqing, China
28	10 February 2010	2010 EAFF Championship		0–3	Yu Hai 5'; Gao Lin 27'; Deng Zhuoxiang 60'	Tokyo, Japan
29	24 July 2013	2013 EAFF Championship		0–0		Hwaseong, South Korea
30	2 August 2015	2015 EAFF Championship	Kim Seung-dae 45'; Lee Jong-ho 58'	2–0		Wuhan, China
31	1 September 2016	2018 FIFA World Cup qualification	Zheng Zhi 20' (o.g.); Lee Chung-yong 62'; Koo Ja-cheol 66'	3–2	Yu Hai 73'; Hao Junmin 76'	Seoul, South Korea
32	23 March 2017	2018 FIFA World Cup qualification		0–1	Yu Dabao 35'	Changsha, China
33	9 December 2017	2017 EAFF Championship	Kim Shin-wook 12'; Lee Jae-sung 19'	2–2	Wei Shihao 9'; Yu Dabao 76'	Tokyo, Japan
34	16 January 2019	2019 AFC Asian Cup	Hwang Ui-jo 14' (pen.); Kim Min-jae 51'	2–0		Abu Dhabi, United Arab Emirates
35	15 December 2019	2019 EAFF Championship	Kim Min-jae 13'	1–0		Busan, South Korea
36	20 July 2022	2022 EAFF Championship	Zhu Chenjie 39' (o.g.); Kwon Chang-hoon 54'; Cho Gue-sung 80'	3–0		Toyota, Japan
37	21 November 2023	2026 FIFA World Cup qualification	Son Heung-min 11' (pen.), 45'; Jung Seung-hyun 87'	3–0		Shenzhen, China
38	11 June 2024	2026 FIFA World Cup qualification	Lee Kang-in 61'	1–0		Seoul, South Korea
39	7 July 2025	2025 EAFF Championship	Lee Dong-gyeong 8'; Joo Min-kyu 21'; Kim Ju-sung 56'	3–0		Yongin, South Korea

== See also ==
- Anti-Chinese sentiment in Korea
- Anti-Korean sentiment in China
- Eul-yong Ta
- China national football team records and statistics
- South Korea national football team records and statistics
