= Hong Kong national football team results (1990–1999) =

- Win Draw Loss

This is a list of the Hong Kong national football team results from 1990 to 1999.

== 1990 ==
23 September 1990 Asian Games; Group 4	Kuwait	2–1	Hong Kong	Beijing, China

25 September 1990 Asian Games; Group 4	Hong Kong	0–2	Thailand	Beijing, China

27 September 1990 Asian Games; Group 4	Hong Kong	2–0	Yemen	Beijing, China

== 1991 ==
No any matches were played in 1991.

== 1992 ==
3 June 1992 AFC Asian Cup; Qualification Group 4	Hong Kong	2–2	Macau	Pyongyang, North Korea

5 June 1992 AFC Asian Cup; Qualification Group 4	Chinese Taipei	0–0	Hong Kong	Pyongyang, North Korea

7 June 1992 AFC Asian Cup; Qualification Group 4	North Korea	0–0	Hong Kong	Pyongyang, North Korea

== 1993 ==
23 April International Friendly	Kuwait	2–2	Hong Kong	Singapore

25 April International Friendly	Kuwait	1–0	Hong Kong	Singapore

7 May 1994 FIFA World Cup; Qualification 1st round group D	Hong Kong	2–1	Bahrain	Beirut, Lebanon

9 May 1994 FIFA World Cup; Qualification 1st round group D	Lebanon	2–2	Hong Kong	Beirut, Lebanon

11 May 1994 FIFA World Cup; Qualification 1st round group D	India	1–2	Hong Kong	Beirut, Lebanon

15 May 1994 FIFA World Cup; Qualification 1st round group D	Hong Kong	0–3	South Korea	Beirut, Lebanon

5 June 1994 FIFA World Cup; Qualification 1st round group D	South Korea	4–1	Hong Kong	Seoul, Korea Republic

9 June 1994 FIFA World Cup; Qualification 1st round group D	Hong Kong	1–2	Lebanon	Seoul, Korea Republic

11 June 1994 FIFA World Cup; Qualification 1st round group D	Bahrain	3–0	Hong Kong	Seoul, Korea Republic

13 June 1994 FIFA World Cup; Qualification 1st round group D	Hong Kong	1–3	India	Seoul, Korea Republic

== 1994 ==
1 October 1994 Asian Games; Group B	Malaysia	4–3	Hong Kong	Hiroshima, Japan
	Abu Haniffah 48'; Adnan 53'; Thanasegar 80'; Salleh 87'		77', 79', 90' (pen.) Bredbury

3 October 1994 Asian Games; Group B	Thailand	1–2	Hong Kong	Hiroshima, Japan
	Chalermsan 67'		Lam Hung Lun; Lee Kin Wo 76'

5 October 1994 Asian Games; Group B	Hong Kong	0–1	Uzbekistan	Hiroshima, Japan
			Abduraimov 20'

11 October 1994 Asian Games; Group B	Hong Kong	1–2	Saudi Arabia	Hiroshima, Japan
	Bredbury 27'		Al-Shenaif 75'; Al-Qanat 87'

== 1995 ==
19 February 1995 Dynasty Cup; Group Stage	Hong Kong	0–3	Japan	So Kon Po, British Hong Kong
			Kurosaki 42', 78'; Hashiratani 70'	Stadium: Hong Kong Stadium; Attendance: 29,753; Referee: Russamee Jindama (Thailand)

21 February 1995 Dynasty Cup; Group Stage	Hong Kong	0–0	China	So Kon Po, British Hong Kong
				Stadium: Hong Kong Stadium; Attendance: 14,292; Referee: Nik Ahmad Yaakub (Malaysia)

23 February 1995 Dynasty Cup; Group Stage	Hong Kong	2–3	South Korea	Mong Kok, British Hong Kong
	Greer 20'; Bredbury 64'		Lee Ki-hyung 15'; Ko Jeong-woon 39'; Choi Yong-soo 88'	Stadium: Mong Kok Stadium; Attendance: 6,223; Referee: Russamee Jindamai (Thailand)

26 February 1995 Dynasty Cup; Third Place Match	Hong Kong	1–1 (a.e.t.) (3–1 p)	China	So Kon Po, British Hong Kong
	Santos 2'		Li Bin 32'	Stadium: Hong Kong Stadium; Attendance: 27,668; Referee: Russamee Jindamai (Thailand)
	Penalties
	Tempest (penalty missed); Bredbury (penalty scored); Tam Siu Wai (penalty scored); Santos (penalty scored)		(penalty scored) Gao Feng; (penalty missed) Zhu Qi; (penalty missed) Li Bing; (penalty missed) Liu Yue

== 1996 ==
30 January 1996 AFC Asian Cup; Qualification Group 2	Hong Kong	8–0	Philippines	Mong Kok, British Hong Kong
				Stadium: Mong Kok Stadium

1 February 1996 AFC Asian Cup; Qualification Group 2	Hong Kong	4–1	Macau	Mong Kok, British Hong Kong
				Stadium: Mong Kok Stadium

4 February 1996 AFC Asian Cup; Qualification Group 2	Hong Kong	0–2	China	So Kon Po, British Hong Kong
				Stadium: Hong Kong Stadium

== 1997 ==
22 February 1998 FIFA World Cup; Qualification 1st Round; Group 6	Hong Kong	0–2	South Korea	British Hong Kong
		(report))	Seo Jung-won 60'; Choi Moon-sik 75'	Referee: Yoshimi Ogawa (Japan)

9 March 1998 FIFA World Cup; Qualification 1st Round; Group 6	Thailand	2–0	Hong Kong	Bangkok, Thailand
	Krissada 23'; Natipong 79'	(report)		Stadium: Rajamangala Stadium; Attendance: 10,000; Referee: Abdul Aziz A. Al Dokhail (Saudi Arabia)

30 March 1998 FIFA World Cup; Qualification 1st Round; Group 6	Hong Kong	3–2	Thailand	So Kon Po, British Hong Kong
	Lee Kin Woo 23'; Cheng Sin Siu 48'; Au Wai Lun 88'	(report)	Natipong 43'; Chalermsan 70'	Stadium: Hong Kong Stadium; Attendance: 20,000; Referee: Nazri Abdullah Mohamed (Malaysia)

28 May 1998 FIFA World Cup; Qualification 1st Round; Group 6	South Korea	4–0	Hong Kong	Daejeon, South Korea
	Yoo Sang-chul 25'; Choi Yong-soo 39', 72'; Park Kun-ha 86'	(report)		Stadium: Daejeon Hanbat Sports Complex; Attendance: 20,000; Referee: Hussein Issa (Iraq)

== 1998 ==
19 November International Friendly	Hong Kong	1–1	Vietnam	Hong Kong

30 November 1998 Asian Games; Group F	Hong Kong	0–6	Oman	Bangkok, Thailand

2 December 1998 Asian Games; Group F	Thailand	5–0	Hong Kong	Bangkok, Thailand

== 1999 ==
12 October International Friendly	Hong Kong	4–3	Mauritius	Hong Kong

18 October 2000 AFC Asian Cup; Qualification Group 7	Hong Kong	4–1	Cambodia	Mong Kok, Hong Kong
	Chen Sin Syu-Chung 34', 52'; Lee Kin Wo 54'; Wong Chi Kyung 83'		Sochetra 40'	Stadium: Mong Kok Stadium

24 October 2000 AFC Asian Cup; Qualification Group 7	Hong Kong	1–1	Indonesia	Mong Kok, Hong Kong
	Au Wai Lun 62'		Putiray 88'	Stadium: Mong Kok Stadium

7 November 2000 AFC Asian Cup; Qualification Group 7	Cambodia	0–1	Hong Kong	Phnom Penh, Cambodia
			Lai Kai Cheuk 58'

20 November 2000 AFC Asian Cup; Qualification Group 7	Indonesia	3–1	Hong Kong	Jakarta, Indonesia
	Ma'ruf 9'; Putiray 48'; Pamungkas 72'		Au Wai Lun 62'	Stadium: Senayan Stadium
