= Japan national football team results (1990–1999) =

This article lists the results for the Japan national football team between 1990 and 1999.

== 1990 ==
Date	Opponent	Result	Score	Venue	Competition
27 July 1990	South Korea	L	0–2	Beijing, China	Dynasty Cup
29 July 1990	China	L	0–1	Beijing, China	Dynasty Cup
31 July 1990	North Korea	L	0–1	Beijing, China	Dynasty Cup
26 September 1990	Bangladesh	W	3–0	Beijing, China	1990 Asian Games Football
28 September 1990	Saudi Arabia	L	0–2	Beijing, China	1990 Asian Games Football
1 October 1990	Iran	L	0–1	Beijing, China	1990 Asian Games Football

== 1991 ==
Date	Opponent	Result	Score	Venue	Competition
2 June 1991	Thailand	W	1–0	ND Soft Stadium Yamagata, Yamagata, Japan	Kirin Cup
27 July 1991	South Korea	L	0–1	Nagasaki Athletic Stadium, Nagasaki, Japan	International Friendly

== 1992 ==
Date	Opponent	Result	Score	Venue	Competition
31 May 1992	Argentina	L	0–1	Tokyo National Stadium, Tokyo, Japan	Kirin Cup
7 June 1992	Wales	L	0–1	Ningineer Stadium, Matsuyama, Japan	Kirin Cup
22 August 1992	South Korea	D	0–0	Beijing, China	Dynasty Cup
24 August 1992	China	W	2–0	Beijing, China	Dynasty Cup
26 August 1992	North Korea	W	4–1	Beijing, China	Dynasty Cup
29 August 1992	South Korea	D	2–2 (a.e.t.); 4–2 (pen.)	Beijing, China	Dynasty Cup
30 October 1992	United Arab Emirates	D	0–0	Bingo Sports Park, Onomichi, Japan	1992 AFC Asian Cup
1 November 1992	North Korea	D	1–1	Hiroshima Big Arch, Hiroshima, Japan	1992 AFC Asian Cup
3 November 1992	Iran	W	1–0	Hiroshima Big Arch, Hiroshima, Japan	1992 AFC Asian Cup
6 November 1992	China	W	3–2	Hiroshima Stadium, Hiroshima, Japan	1992 AFC Asian Cup
8 November 1992	Saudi Arabia	W	1–0	Hiroshima Big Arch, Hiroshima, Japan	1992 AFC Asian Cup

== 1993 ==
Date	Opponent	Result	Score	Venue	Competition
7 March 1993	Hungary	L	0–1	Hakatanomori Athletic Stadium, Fukuoka, Japan	Kirin Cup
14 March 1993	United States	W	3–1	Tokyo National Stadium, Tokyo, Japan	Kirin Cup
8 April 1993	Thailand	W	1–0	Kobe Universiade Memorial Stadium, Kobe, Japan	1994 FIFA World Cup qualification (AFC)
11 April 1993	Bangladesh	W	8–0	Tokyo National Stadium, Tokyo, Japan	1994 FIFA World Cup qualification (AFC)
15 April 1993	Sri Lanka	W	5–0	Tokyo National Stadium, Tokyo, Japan	1994 FIFA World Cup qualification (AFC)
18 April 1993	United Arab Emirates	W	2–0	Tokyo National Stadium, Tokyo, Japan	1994 FIFA World Cup qualification (AFC)
28 April 1993	Thailand	W	1–0	Dubai, United Arab Emirates	1994 FIFA World Cup qualification (AFC)
30 April 1993	Bangladesh	W	4–1	Dubai, United Arab Emirates	1994 FIFA World Cup qualification (AFC)
5 May 1993	Sri Lanka	W	6–0	Dubai, United Arab Emirates	1994 FIFA World Cup qualification (AFC)
7 May 1993	United Arab Emirates	D	1–1	Al Ain, United Arab Emirates	1994 FIFA World Cup qualification (AFC)
4 October 1993	Ivory Coast	W	1–0	Tokyo National Stadium, Tokyo, Japan	1993 Afro-Asian Cup of Nations
15 October 1993	Saudi Arabia	D	0–0	Doha, Qatar	1994 FIFA World Cup qualification (AFC)
18 October 1993	Iran	L	1–2	Doha, Qatar	1994 FIFA World Cup qualification (AFC)
21 October 1993	North Korea	W	3–0	Doha, Qatar	1994 FIFA World Cup qualification (AFC)
25 October 1993	South Korea	W	1–0	Doha, Qatar	1994 FIFA World Cup qualification (AFC)
28 October 1993	Iraq	D	2–2	Doha, Qatar	1994 FIFA World Cup qualification (AFC)

== 1994 ==
Date	Opponent	Result	Score	Venue	Competition
22 May 1994	Australia	D	1–1	Hiroshima Big Arch, Hiroshima, Japan	Kirin Cup
29 May 1994	France	L	1–4	Tokyo National Stadium, Tokyo, Japan	Kirin Cup
8 July 1994	Ghana	W	3–2	Mizuho Athletic Stadium, Nagoya, Japan	Asics Cup
14 July 1994	Ghana	W	2–1	Kobe Universiade Memorial Stadium, Kobe, Japan	Asics Cup
27 September 1994	Australia	D	0–0	Tokyo National Stadium, Tokyo, Japan	International Friendly
3 October 1994	United Arab Emirates	D	1–1	Miyoshi Kinsai Stadium, Hiroshima, Japan	1994 Asian Games Football
5 October 1994	Qatar	D	1–1	Hiroshima Stadium, Hiroshima, Japan	1994 Asian Games Football
9 October 1994	Burma	W	5–0	Bingo Athletic Stadium, Hiroshima, Japan	1994 Asian Games Football
11 October 1994	South Korea	L	2–3	Hiroshima Stadium, Hiroshima, Japan	1994 Asian Games Football

== 1995 ==
Date	Opponent	Result	Score	Venue	Competition
6 January 1995	Nigeria	L	0–3	King Fahd II Stadium, Riyadh, Saudi Arabia	1995 King Fahd Cup
8 January 1995	Argentina	L	1–5	King Fahd II Stadium, Riyadh, Saudi Arabia	1995 King Fahd Cup
15 February 1995	Australia	L	1–2	Sydney, Australia	International Friendly
19 February 1995	Hong Kong	W	3–0^{1}	Hong Kong Stadium, So Kon Po, Hong Kong	1995 Dynasty Cup
21 February 1995	South Korea	D	1–1	Hong Kong Stadium, So Kon Po, Hong Kong	1995 Dynasty Cup
23 February 1995	China	W	2–1	Mong Kok Stadium, Mong Kok, Hong Kong	1995 Dynasty Cup
26 February 1995	South Korea	D	2–2 (a.e.t.); 5–3 (pen.)	Hong Kong Stadium, So Kon Po, Hong Kong	1995 Dynasty Cup
21 May 1995	Scotland	D	0–0	Hiroshima Big Arch, Hiroshima, Japan	Kirin Cup
28 May 1995	Ecuador	W	3–0	Tokyo National Stadium, Tokyo, Japan	Kirin Cup
3 June 1995	England	L	1–2	(United Kingdom) Wembley Stadium, London, Great Britain	Umbro Cup
6 June 1995	Brazil	L	0–3	(United Kingdom) Goodison Park, Liverpool, Great Britain	Umbro Cup
10 June 1995	Sweden	D	2–2	(United Kingdom) City Ground, Nottingham, Great Britain	Umbro Cup
6 August 1995	Costa Rica	D	3–0	Nishikyogoku Athletic Stadium, Kyoto, Japan	International Friendly
9 August 1995	Brazil	L	1–5	Tokyo National Stadium, Tokyo, Japan	International Friendly
20 September 1995	Paraguay	L	1–2	Tokyo National Stadium, Tokyo, Japan	1995 Descente Adidas match
24 October 1995	Saudi Arabia	W	2–1	Tokyo National Stadium, Tokyo, Japan	1995 Descente Adidas match
28 October 1995	Saudi Arabia	W	2–1	Ningineer Stadium, Matsuyama, Japan	1995 Descente Adidas match
1:This match is not recognized because the players came from Hong Kong League XI.

== 1996 ==
Date	Opponent	Result	Score	Venue	Competition
10 February 1996	Australia	W	4–1	Wollongong, Australia	International Friendly
14 February 1996	Australia	L	0–3	Melbourne, Australia	International Friendly
19 February 1996	Poland	W	5–0	Hong Kong	Lunar New Year Cup
22 February 1996	Sweden	D	1–1; 4–5 (pen.)	Hong Kong	Lunar New Year Cup
26 May 1996	FR Yugoslavia	W	1–0	Tokyo National Stadium, Tokyo, Japan	Kirin Cup
29 May 1996	Mexico	W	3–2	Higashihirao Koen Level-5 Stadium, Fukuoka, Japan	Kirin Cup
25 August 1996	Uruguay	W	5–3	Nagai Stadium, Osaka, Japan	International Friendly
11 September 1996	Uzbekistan	W	1–0	Tokyo National Stadium, Tokyo, Japan	International Friendly
13 October 1996	Tunisia	W	1–0	Kobe Universiade Memorial Stadium, Kobe, Japan	Puma Cup
6 December 1996	Syria	W	2–1	Al Ain, United Arab Emirates	1996 AFC Asian Cup
9 December 1996	Uzbekistan	W	4–0	Al Ain, United Arab Emirates	1996 AFC Asian Cup
12 December 1996	China	W	1–0	Al Ain, United Arab Emirates	1996 AFC Asian Cup
15 December 1996	Kuwait	L	0–2	Al Ain, United Arab Emirates	1996 AFC Asian Cup

== 1997 ==
Date	Opponent	Result	Score	Venue	Competition
9 February 1997	Thailand	D	1–1	Bangkok, Thailand	King's Cup
13 February 1997	Sweden	L	0–1	Bangkok, Thailand	King's Cup
15 March 1997	Thailand	L	1–3	Bangkok, Thailand	International Friendly
23 March 1997	Oman	W	1–0	Muscat, Oman	1998 FIFA World Cup qualification (AFC)
25 March 1997	Macau	W	10–0	Muscat, Oman	1998 FIFA World Cup qualification (AFC)
27 March 1997	Nepal	W	6–0	Muscat, Oman	1998 FIFA World Cup qualification (AFC)
21 May 1997	South Korea	D	1–1	Tokyo National Stadium, Tokyo, Japan	International Friendly
8 June 1997	Croatia	W	4–3	Tokyo National Stadium, Tokyo, Japan	Kirin Cup
15 June 1997	Turkey	W	1–0	Nagai Stadium, Osaka, Japan	Kirin Cup
22 June 1997	Macau	W	10–0	Tokyo National Stadium, Tokyo, Japan	1998 FIFA World Cup qualification (AFC)
25 June 1997	Nepal	W	3–0	Tokyo National Stadium, Tokyo, Japan	1998 FIFA World Cup qualification (AFC)
28 June 1997	Oman	D	1–1	Tokyo National Stadium, Tokyo, Japan	1998 FIFA World Cup qualification (AFC)
13 August 1997	Brazil	L	0–3	Nagai Stadium, Osaka, Japan	International Friendly
7 September 1997	Uzbekistan	W	6–3	Tokyo National Stadium, Tokyo, Japan	1998 FIFA World Cup qualification (AFC)
19 September 1997	United Arab Emirates	D	0–0	Abu Dhabi, United Arab Emirates	1998 FIFA World Cup qualification (AFC)
28 September 1997	South Korea	L	1–2	Tokyo National Stadium, Tokyo, Japan	1998 FIFA World Cup qualification (AFC)
4 October 1997	Kazakhstan	D	1–1	Almaty, Kazakhstan	1998 FIFA World Cup qualification (AFC)
11 October 1997	Uzbekistan	D	1–1	Tashkent, Uzbekistan	1998 FIFA World Cup qualification (AFC)
26 October 1997	United Arab Emirates	D	1–1	Tokyo National Stadium, Tokyo, Japan	1998 FIFA World Cup qualification (AFC)
1 November 1997	South Korea	W	2–0	Seoul, South Korea	1998 FIFA World Cup qualification (AFC)
8 November 1997	Kazakhstan	W	5–1	Tokyo National Stadium, Tokyo, Japan	1998 FIFA World Cup qualification (AFC)
16 November 1997	Iran	W	3–2	Johor Bahru, Malaysia	1998 FIFA World Cup qualification (AFC)

== 1998 ==
Date	Opponent	Result	Score	Venue	Competition	Ref.
15 February 1998	Australia	W	3–0	Adelaide, Australia	International Friendly	
1 March 1998	South Korea	W	2–1	International Stadium Yokohama, Yokohama, Japan	1998 Dynasty Cup	
4 March 1998	Hong Kong League XI	W	5–1^{a}	International Stadium Yokohama, Yokohama, Japan	1998 Dynasty Cup	
7 March 1998	China	L	0–2	Tokyo National Stadium, Tokyo, Japan	1998 Dynasty Cup	
1 April 1998	South Korea	L	1–2	Seoul, South Korea	International Friendly	
17 May 1998	Paraguay	D	1–1	Tokyo National Stadium, Tokyo, Japan	Kirin Cup	
24 May 1998	Czech Republic	D	0–0	International Stadium Yokohama, Yokohama, Japan	Kirin Cup	
31 May 1998	Mexico	L	1–2	Lausanne, Switzerland	International Friendly	
3 June 1998	FR Yugoslavia	L	0–1	Lausanne, Switzerland	International Friendly	
14 June 1998	Argentina	L	0–1	Stade de Toulouse, Toulouse, France	1998 FIFA World Cup	
20 June 1998	Croatia	L	0–1	Stade de la Beaujoire, Nantes, France	1998 FIFA World Cup	
26 June 1998	Jamaica	L	1–2	Stade Gerland, Lyon, France	1998 FIFA World Cup	
28 October 1998	Egypt	W	1–0	Nagai Stadium, Osaka, Japan	International Friendly (Kirin Challenge Cup)	
1 December 1998	Nepal	W	5–0^{b}	Bangkok, Thailand	1998 Asian Games Football	
3 December 1998	India	W	1–0^{b}	Bangkok, Thailand	1998 Asian Games Football	
7 December 1998	South Korea	L	0–2^{b}	Bangkok, Thailand	1998 Asian Games Football	
9 December 1998	Kuwait	W	2–1^{b}	Bangkok, Thailand	1998 Asian Games Football	
11 December 1998	United Arab Emirates	L	0–1	Bangkok, Thailand	1998 Asian Games Football	
a: The matches against Hong Kong League XI is not recognized by JFA as an official "A" match. b: The five matches in the 1998 Asian Games in Bangkok are not recognized by JFA as official "A" matches because Japan effectively field an under-21 squad.

== 1999 ==
Date	Opponent	Result	Score	Venue	Competition	Ref.
31 March 1999	Brazil	L	0–2	Tokyo National Stadium, Tokyo, Japan	International Friendly(Kirin Challenge Cup)	
3 June 1999	Belgium	D	0–0	Tokyo National Stadium, Tokyo, Japan	Kirin Cup	
6 June 1999	Peru	D	0–0	International Stadium Yokohama, Yokohama, Japan	Kirin Cup	
29 June 1999	Peru	L	2–3	Asunción, Paraguay	1999 Copa América	
2 July 1999	Paraguay	L	0–4	Asunción, Paraguay	1999 Copa América	
5 July 1999	Bolivia	D	1–1	Pedro Juan Caballero, Paraguay	1999 Copa América	
8 September 1999	Iran	D	1–1	International Stadium Yokohama, Yokohama, Japan	International Friendly(Kirin Challenge Cup)	

== See also ==
- Japan at the Copa América
