= Liu Yue =

Liu Yue is the name of:

- Liu Yue (footballer, born 1975), Chinese international footballer
- Liu Yue (footballer, born 1997), Chinese footballer
