= Hans Ooft =

Dutch footballer and manager

Personal information
- Full name: Marius Johan Ooft
- Date of birth: June 27, 1947 (age 79)
- Place of birth: Rotterdam
- Position: Striker

Senior career*
Years	Team	Apps	(Gls)
1964–1967	Feyenoord U21		
1967–1970	SC Veendam		
1970–1974	SC Cambuur		
1974–1975	SC Heerenveen		

Managerial career
- 1976: Netherlands Youth
- 1987–1988: Mazda
- 1992–1993: Japan
- 1994–1996: Júbilo Iwata
- 1998: Kyoto Purple Sanga
- 2002–2003: Urawa Red Diamonds
- 2008: Júbilo Iwata
Medal record
Men's football
Representing Japan (as manager)
AFC Asian Cup
Winner	1992
Dynasty Cup
Winner	1992
- * Club domestic league appearances and goals

Marius Johan "Hans" Ooft (born 1947) is a Dutch former football player and manager who became the first foreigner to head the Japanese football team. Under Ooft, Japan won the Asian Championship for the first time in 1992 but was fired a year later for failing to qualify them for the 1994 World Cup in a crucial match against Iraq.

== Managerial statistics ==
Team	From	To	Record					Refs
Team	From	To	G	W	D	L	Win %	Refs
Japan	April 1, 1992	November 11, 1993	27	16	7	4	59.26	
Júbilo Iwata	1994	1996	144	77	3	64	53.47	(Note: Club statistics include J.League and J.League Cup figures.)
Kyoto Purple Sanga	1998	1998	16	3	2	11	18.75	
Urawa Red Diamonds	2002	2003	80	37	14	29	46.25	
Júbilo Iwata	2008	2008	11	3	2	6	27.27	
Total			278	136	28	114	48.92	

== Honors ==
=== Manager ===
Japan

- AFC Asian Cup: 1992
- Dynasty Cup: 1992
- Afro-Asian Cup of Nations: 1993

Urawa Red Diamonds

- J.League Cup: 2003

Individual

- Japan Football Hall of Fame: Inducted in 2013
