= Kim Pan-keun =

South Korean footballer (born 1966)

Personal information
- Full name: Kim Pan-keun
- Date of birth: 5 March 1966 (age 60)
- Place of birth: Haenam, Jeonnam, South Korea
- Height: 1.65 m (5 ft 5 in)
- Position: Right-back

Team information
- Current team: BSP Youth Academy

College career
Years	Team	Apps	(Gls)
1983–1986	Korea University		

Senior career*
Years	Team	Apps	(Gls)
1987–1993	Daewoo Royals	160	(11)
1994–1997	Anyang LG Cheetahs	78	(2)
1998–2001	Marconi Stallions	69	(4)
Total		307	(17)

International career
1982–1983	South Korea U20		
1985	South Korea B		
1983–1996	South Korea	59	(3)
Medal record
Representing South Korea
Men's football
Asian Games
Bronze medal – third place	1990 Beijing	Team
AFC Youth Championship
Gold medal – first place	1982 Thailand	Team
- * Club domestic league appearances and goals

Kim Pan-keun (Korean: 김판근, born 5 March 1966) is former South Korean footballer.

== International career ==
When South Korea reached the semi-finals in the 1983 FIFA World Youth Championship, Kim was a key member of the semi-finalists and became the only South Korean player to be selected for the All-Star Team. After the World Youth Championship, he was called up to senior national team that year, becoming the youngest South Korean player to make a senior international debut. (17 years, 241 days) He also participated in the 1994 FIFA World Cup.

== Personal life ==
Kim's son, Danny Kim, is also a footballer and has played for Brisbane Roar in the A-League and the Australian under-17 national side.

== Career statistics ==
=== Club ===
Appearances and goals by club, season and competition
Club	Season	League			National cup		League cup		Total	
Club	Season	Division	Apps	Goals	Apps	Goals	Apps	Goals	Apps	Goals
Daewoo Royals	1987	K League	30	2	—		—		30	2
Daewoo Royals	1988	K League	3	2	?	?	—		3	2
Daewoo Royals	1989	K League	30	2	?	?	—		30	2
Daewoo Royals	1990	K League	20	0	—		—		20	0
Daewoo Royals	1991	K League	37	2	—		—		37	2
Daewoo Royals	1992	K League	17	1	—		6	0	23	1
Daewoo Royals	1993	K League	23	2	—		1	0	24	2
Daewoo Royals	Total		160	11	?	?	7	0	167	11
Anyang LG Cheetahs	1994	K League	23	0	—		0	0	23	0
Anyang LG Cheetahs	1995	K League	28	1	—		7	0	35	1
Anyang LG Cheetahs	1996	K League	15	0	?	?	0	0	15	0
Anyang LG Cheetahs	1997	K League	12	1	?	?	15	0	27	1
Anyang LG Cheetahs	Total		78	2	?	?	22	0	100	2
Marconi Stallions	1997–98	National Soccer League	20	2	—		—		20	2
Marconi Stallions	1998–99	National Soccer League	17	2	—		—		17	2
Marconi Stallions	1999–2000	National Soccer League	16	0	—		—		16	0
Marconi Stallions	2000–01	National Soccer League	16	0	—		—		16	0
Marconi Stallions	Total		69	4	—		—		69	4
Career total			307	17	?	?	29	0	336	17

=== International ===
Results list South Korea's goal tally first.

List of international goals scored by Kim Pan-keun
No.	Date	Venue	Opponent	Score	Result	Competition
1	21 June 1987	Seoul, South Korea	Australia	1–0	1–1 (5–4 p)	1987 Korea Cup
2	19 October 1993	Doha, Qatar	Iraq	1–1	2–2	1994 FIFA World Cup qualification
3	26 February 1994	Los Angeles, United States	Colombia	1–0	2–2	Friendly

== Honours ==
Korea University

- Korean National Championship: 1985

Daewoo Royals

- K League 1: 1987, 1991
- Korean National Championship: 1989

Anyang LG Cheetahs

- Korean League Cup runner-up: 1994

South Korea U20

- AFC Youth Championship: 1982

South Korea

- Asian Games bronze medal: 1990
- Afro-Asian Cup of Nations: 1987
- Dynasty Cup: 1990

Individual

- FIFA World Youth Championship All-Star Team: 1983
- Korean FA Best XI: 1984
- K League All-Star: 1991, 1992, 1995
- K League 1 Best XI: 1993, 1995
- K League '90s All-Star Team: 2003
