= Kim Jong-song =

North Korean footballer (born 1964)

Kim Jong-Song
Personal information
- Full name: Kim Jong-Song
- Date of birth: April 23, 1964 (age 62)
- Place of birth: Tokyo, Japan
- Height: 1.83 m (6 ft 0 in)
- Position: Forward

Senior career*
Years	Team	Apps	(Gls)
1987–1994	Zainichi Chosen FC		
1995	Júbilo Iwata	2	(0)
1996	Consadole Sapporo	20	(4)
1997–1998	Zainichi Chosen FC		

International career
1990–1992	North Korea	20	(2)

Managerial career
- 2010–2014: Korea University
- 2016–2018: FC Ryukyu
- 2019–2021: Kagoshima United
- 2021–2023: Gainare Tottori
- 2023–2024: FC Ryukyu
- 2025: Kamatamare Sanuki
- * Club domestic league appearances and goals

- Kim Jong-song
- Hangul: 김종성
- Hanja: 金鍾成
- RR: Gim Jongseong
- MR: Kim Chongsŏng

Kim Jong-Song (Korean: 김종성; born 23 April 1964) is a professional football manager and former footballer who was most recently the manager of Kamatamare Sanuki. Born in Japan, he represented the North Korea national team and represented them at the 1992 AFC Asian Cup.

== Managerial statistics ==
As of end of 2025 season

Team	From	To	Record				
Team	From	To	G	W	D	L	Win %
FC Ryukyu	2016	2018	98	46	27	25	46.94
Kagoshima United	2019	2021	77	29	11	37	37.66
Gainare Tottori	2021	2023	73	23	12	38	31.51
FC Ryukyu	2023	2024	52	18	14	20	34.62
Kamatamare Sanuki	2025	2025	18	6	3	9	33.33
Total			318	122	67	129	38.36

== International goals ==
No.	Date	Venue	Opponent	Score	Result	Competition
1.	22 August 1992	Beijing, China	China	2–1	2–2	1992 Dynasty Cup
2.	26 August 1992	Beijing, China	Japan	1–0	1–4	1992 Dynasty Cup
