= 1996 Lunar New Year Cup =

Tournament details
- Host country: Hong Kong
- Dates: 4 – 7 February
- Teams: 4
- Venue: 1 (in 1 host city)

Final positions
- Champions: Sweden (1st title)

Tournament statistics
- Matches played: 4
- Goals scored: 9 (2.25 per match)
- Top scorer(s): (Japan) Takuya Takagi (Japan) Norio Omura (2 goals)

The 1996 Lunar New Year Cup was a football tournament held in Hong Kong over the first and fourth day of the Chinese New Year holiday.

== Participating teams ==
- Hong Kong League XI (host)
- Japan
- Sweden
- Poland

== Results ==
=== Semifinals ===
4 February 1996

Japan	5–0	Poland
Yamaguchi 31'; Takagi 33', 77'; Omura 41'; Miura 63'	Report

Hong Kong Stadium, Hong Kong
Attendance: 27,456
Referee: Esfandiar Baharmast (USA)

4 February 1996

Hong Kong League XI	0–1	Sweden
	Report	Alexandersson 65'

Hong Kong Stadium, Hong Kong
Attendance: 27,456
Referee: Peter Mikkelsen (Denmark)

=== Third place match ===
7 February 1996

Hong Kong League XI	0–1	Poland
	Report	Śrutwa 27'

Hong Kong Stadium, Hong Kong
Attendance: 32,019
Referee: Esfandiar Baharmast (USA)

=== Final ===
7 February 1996

Japan	1–1 (a.e.t.)	Sweden
Omura 65'	Report	Pringle 52'
Penalties
Miura (penalty scored); Sōma (penalty scored); Takagi (penalty missed); Honda (penalty scored); Ihara (penalty scored)	4–5	(penalty scored) Landberg; (penalty scored) Karlsson; (penalty scored) R. Nilsson; (penalty scored) M. Nilsson; (penalty scored) Alexandersson

Hong Kong Stadium, Hong Kong
Attendance: 31,932
Referee: Peter Mikkelsen (Denmark)

== Bracket ==
Semi-finals
4 February 1996 – Hong Kong
Japan	5
Poland	0
4 February 1996 – Hong Kong
Sweden	1
Hong Kong League XI	0

Final
7 February 1996 – Hong Kong
Sweden (pen.)	1 (5)
Japan	1 (4)
Third place
7 February 1996 – Hong Kong
Poland	1
Hong Kong League XI	0

1996 Carlsberg Cup Winner
Sweden
First Title

== Top scorers ==
2 goals

- (Japan) Takuya Takagi
- (Japan) Norio Omura

1 goal

- (Japan) Motohiro Yamaguchi
- (Japan) Kazuyoshi Miura
- (Sweden) Martin Pringle
- (Sweden) Niclas Alexandersson
- (Poland) Mariusz Śrutwa

== See also ==
- Hong Kong Football Association
- Hong Kong First Division League
