= 1992 Dynasty Cup =

Tournament details
- Host country: China
- Dates: 22–29 August 1992
- Teams: 4 (from 1 confederation)
- Venue: 1 (in 1 host city)

Final positions
- Champions: Japan (1st title)
- Runners-up: South Korea
- Third place: North Korea
- Fourth place: China

Tournament statistics
- Matches played: 7
- Goals scored: 19 (2.71 per match)
- Attendance: 280,000 (40,000 per match)
- Top scorer: (Japan) Takuya Takagi (4 goals)
- Best player: (Japan) Kazuyoshi Miura

The 1992 Dynasty Cup was a football competition for the top four teams of East Asia. The second edition of the Dynasty Cup was held from 22 to 29 August 1992 in China. The competition was won by Japan.

== Participating teams ==
- China
- Japan
- South Korea
- North Korea

== Results ==
=== Group stage ===
Team	Pld	W	D	L	GF	GA	GD	Pts
Japan	3	2	1	0	6	1	+5	5
South Korea	3	1	2	0	3	1	+2	4
North Korea	3	0	2	1	4	7	–3	2
China	3	0	1	2	2	6	–4	1

22 August 1992

South Korea	0–0	Japan

Attendance: 50,000
Referee: Nizar Watti (Syria)
22 August 1992

China	2–2	North Korea
Xu Hong 65'; Gao Hongbo 89'		Choi Won-nam 41'; Kim Jong-song 75'

Attendance: 55,000
Referee: Mohamed Nazri Abdullah (Malaysia)

24 August 1992

China	0–2	Japan
		Fukuda 38'; Takagi 82'

Attendance: 60,000
Referee: Pirom Un-prasert (Thailand)
24 August 1992

South Korea	1–1	North Korea
Hong Myung-bo 22'		Choi Yong-son 89'

Attendance: 60,000
Referee: Nizar Watti (Syria)

26 August 1992

North Korea	1–4	Japan
Kim Jong-song 13'		Fukuda 33'; Takagi 35', 46'; Miura 74'

Attendance: 20,000
Referee: Samuel Chan Yam Ming (Hong Kong)
26 August 1992

China	0–2	South Korea
		Park Hyun-yong 19'; Jung Jae-kwon 73'

Attendance: 20,000
Referee: Ali Mohamed Al-Majid (Bahrain)

=== Final ===
29 August 1992

Japan	2–2	South Korea
Nakayama 83'; Takagi 96'		Jung Jae-kwon 32'; Kim Jung-hyuk 97'
Penalties
Hashiratani (penalty scored); Ihara (penalty scored); Miura (penalty scored); Kitazawa (penalty scored)	4–2	(penalty scored) Kim Jung-hyuk; (penalty scored) Lee Sang-yoon; (penalty missed) Choi Kang-hee; (penalty missed) Ko Jeong-woon

Attendance: 15,000
Referee: Pirom Un-prasert (Thailand)
