= Takuya Takagi =

Japanese footballer and manager

Takuya Takagi 高木 琢也
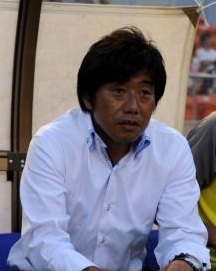
- Takagi with Roasso Kumamoto

Personal information
- Date of birth: November 12, 1967 (age 59)
- Place of birth: Minamishimabara, Nagasaki, Japan
- Height: 1.88 m (6 ft 2 in)
- Position: Forward

Team information
- Current team: V-Varen Nagasaki (manager)

Youth career
- 1983–1985: Kunimi High School

College career
Years	Team	Apps	(Gls)
1986–1989	Osaka University of Commerce		

Senior career*
Years	Team	Apps	(Gls)
1990–1991	Fujita Industries	15	(3)
1991–1997	Sanfrecce Hiroshima	173	(62)
1998–1999	Verdy Kawasaki	40	(11)
2000	Consadole Sapporo	17	(0)
Total		245	(76)

International career
1992–1997	Japan	44	(27)

Managerial career
- 2006–2007: Yokohama FC
- 2009: Tokyo Verdy
- 2010–2012: Roasso Kumamoto
- 2013–2018: V-Varen Nagasaki
- 2019–2020: Omiya Ardija
- 2021–2022: SC Sagamihara
- 2025–: V-Varen Nagasaki
Medal record
Sanfrecce Hiroshima
Runner-up	J1 League	1994
Runner-up	Emperor's Cup	1995
Runner-up	Emperor's Cup	1996
Representing Japan
AFC Asian Cup
Gold medal – first place	1992 Japan
- * Club domestic league appearances and goals

Takuya Takagi (高木 琢也, Takagi Takuya; born November 12, 1967) is a Japanese football manager and former player, who is currently the manager of J1 League club V-Varen Nagasaki, He played for Japan national team. He was a physical forward and the Japanese media and fans dubbed him as the Cannon of Asia.

His son Toshiya is also a footballer.

== Club career ==
Takagi was educated at and played for Kunimi High School and Osaka University of Commerce. After finishing the university in 1990, he joined Japan Soccer League side Fujita Industries (current Shonan Bellmare). He moved to Mazda (current Sanfrecce Hiroshima) in 1991 and was awarded the JSL Young Player of the Year in 1992. His partnership with Czech Ivan Hašek up front was so successful that Hiroshima won the second stage of J1 League in 1994.

Due to financial difficulties, Hiroshima was forced to release their key players including Takagi in 1998. He moved to Verdy Kawasaki. He was then transferred to J2 League side Consadole Sapporo in 2000 and retired there at the end of the season.

== International career ==
Takagi was capped 44 times and scored 27 goals for the Japan national team. He made his international debut in a friendly against Argentina on May 31, 1992 at the Tokyo National Stadium, the first match under Hans Ooft's reign. He scored his first international goal in a Dynasty Cup match against China on August 24, 1992, in Beijing. He became the ace striker for Ooft's Japan national team.

He was a member of the Japan team that won the 1992 AFC Asian Cup. He scored the lone goal in the final against Saudi Arabia and even though he is said to be awarded the Most Valuable Player of the competition, this is not true. The honor went to his teammate Kazuyoshi Miura. Takagi wasn't even elected into the Tournament Best Eleven.

He was also a member of the Japan squad who participated in the 1994 FIFA World Cup qualification for the 1994 FIFA World Cup. He was suspended for the crucial last match that the Japanese fans now refer to as the Agony of Doha, and watched from the bench a late Iraqi equaliser dashed Japan's hope to qualify for the finals in the USA.

He also took part in the 1996 AFC Asian Cup hosted by UAE. He played three games and scored one goal against Syria in the competition.

== Coaching career ==
=== Until 2004 ===
After finishing his playing career, he worked as a soccer commentator on television. He also acquired the S-Class Coaching License that was a prerequisite to manage a J.League club in 2004.

=== Yokohama FC ===
At the beginning of 2006, he was appointed an assistant coach at Yokohama FC. He was unexpectedly promoted to the manager of the club to replace Yusuke Adachi who was sacked only after the team lost to Ehime FC in the opening match of the season. Takagi's lack of coaching experience and untimely dismissal of Adachi worried the fans who decided in protest to watch the second match of the season (the first match under Takagi) in silence.

However, Takagi quickly convinced the supporters as he guided the club unbeaten for the first fifteen matches under his reign. This was the record unbeaten run since appointment of a new manager in J.League. The club made another J.League record when they did not concede any goal for 770 consecutive minutes by breaking Shimizu S-Pulse's 731 minutes recorded in 1993. They kept 7 consecutive clean sheets which was also a tied J2 League record.

Yokohama FC, who had been languishing in the bottom half of the standing previous 5 seasons since their accession to J2, won the title and gained the first-ever promotion to J1 League.

The club made a drastic change in their squad before the beginning of the 2007 season in preparation for the fight in the top-flight. Eleven players left while another eleven joined the club. Those who left included the striking partners Shoji Jo and Alemão who scored 30 goals together out of club's 61 goals in the previous season. Long-serving Tomotaka Kitamura and Tsuyoshi Yoshitake also left. Takagi enhanced his squad by recruiting former Japanese internationals Tatsuhiko Kubo and Daisuke Oku (both from Yokohama F. Marinos), and Gilmar Silva (from Tokyo Verdy).

They beat Marinos in a Yokohama derby in the second match of the season, but otherwise the things didn't go well for Takagi. New team leaders Oku and Kubo were sidelined due to injuries and the club was anchored at the bottom of the standing. The club signed high-profile former Japanese international midfielder Atsuhiro Miura in August. Apparently there was a conflict between the management and Takagi as he expressed disgruntlement on Miura's signing quoting that what the club needed at that point was a good defender or forward. He was sacked on August 27, 2007, and replaced by Brazilian Júlio César Leal.

=== Tokyo Verdy ===
In 2008, Takagi signed with Tokyo Verdy returned to J1 and he served as assistant coach under manager and his former international teammate Tetsuji Hashiratani in 2008. However Verdy was relegated to J2 in a year and Hashiratani resigned end of the season. Takagi was promoted to the manager as Hashiratani successor. However he was sacked for poor performance in October.

=== Roasso Kumamoto ===
He was appointed the manager of Roasso Kumamoto in 2010, and managed until his resignation after 2012 season.

=== V-Varen Nagasaki ===
On 20 December 2012, Takagi's local club V-Varen Nagasaki made an announcement that they appointed Takagi as the manager of newly promoted club to the 2013 J2 League. In 2017 season, the club won the 2nd place and was promoted to J1 first time in the club history. In 2018, V-Varen gain several players who Takagi's junior at his high school, Yuhei Tokunaga, Hokuto Nakamura and Kenta Tokushige. However the club finished at the bottom place and was relegated to J2, Takagi resigned end of the 2018 season.

=== Omiya Ardija ===
In 2019, Takagi signed with J2 club Omiya Ardija.

== Career statistics ==
=== Club ===
Appearances and goals by club, season and competition
Club	Season	League			Emperor's Cup		J.League Cup		Total	
Club	Season	Division	Apps	Goals	Apps	Goals	Apps	Goals	Apps	Goals
Fujita Industries	1990–91	JSL Division 2	15	3			0	0	15	3
Mazda	1991–92	JSL Division 1	22	9			0	0	22	9
Sanfrecce Hiroshima	1992	J1 League	–		0	0	7	4	7	4
Sanfrecce Hiroshima	1993	J1 League	29	11	2	0	0	0	31	11
Sanfrecce Hiroshima	1994	J1 League	42	14	0	0	1	0	43	14
Sanfrecce Hiroshima	1995	J1 League	24	5	5	4	–		29	9
Sanfrecce Hiroshima	1996	J1 League	30	11	5	2	6	1	41	14
Sanfrecce Hiroshima	1997	J1 League	26	12	2	1	0	0	28	13
Verdy Kawasaki	1998	J1 League	22	9	3	0	1	0	26	9
Verdy Kawasaki	1999	J1 League	18	2	0	0	3	1	21	3
Consadole Sapporo	2000	J2 League	17	0	3	1	1	0	21	1
Career total			245	76	20	8	20	6	285	90

=== International ===
Appearances and goals by national team and year
National team	Year	Apps	Goals
Japan	1992	11	5
Japan	1993	13	7
Japan	1994	5	2
Japan	1995	0	0
Japan	1996	10	6
Japan	1997	5	7
Total		44	27

== International goals ==
No.	Date	Venue	Opponent	Score	Result	Competition
1.	24 August 1992	Beijing, China	China	2–0	2–0	1992 Dynasty Cup
2.	26 August 1992	Beijing, China	North Korea	2–1	4–1	1992 Dynasty Cup
3.	26 August 1992	Beijing, China	North Korea	3–1	4–1	1992 Dynasty Cup
4.	29 August 1992	Beijing, China	South Korea	2–1	2–2 (a.e.t.) (4–2 p)	1992 Dynasty Cup
5.	8 November 1992	Hiroshima, Japan	Saudi Arabia	1–0	1–0	1992 AFC Asian Cup
6.	11 April 1993	Tokyo, Japan	Bangladesh	2–0	8–0	1994 FIFA World Cup qualification
7.	11 April 1993	Tokyo, Japan	Bangladesh	6–0	8–0	1994 FIFA World Cup qualification
8.	15 April 1993	Tokyo, Japan	Sri Lanka	1–0	5–0	1994 FIFA World Cup qualification
9.	15 April 1993	Tokyo, Japan	Sri Lanka	4–0	5–0	1994 FIFA World Cup qualification
10.	18 April 1993	Tokyo, Japan	United Arab Emirates	2–0	2–0	1994 FIFA World Cup qualification
11.	30 April 1993	Dubai, UAE	Bangladesh	4–1	4–1	1994 FIFA World Cup qualification
12.	5 May 1994	Dubai, UAE	Sri Lanka	4–0	6–0	1994 FIFA World Cup qualification
13.	5 October 1994	Hiroshima, Japan	Qatar	1–1	1–1	1994 Asian Games
14.	9 October 1994	Onomichi, Japan	Myanmar	2–0	5–0	1994 Asian Games
15.	10 February 1996	Wollongong, Australia	Australia	2–0	4–1	Friendly
16.	10 February 1996	Wollongong, Australia	Australia	3–0	4–1	Friendly
17.	19 February 1996	Causeway Bay, Hong Kong	Poland	2–0	5–0	1996 Lunar New Year Cup
18.	19 February 1996	Causeway Bay, Hong Kong	Poland	5–0	5–0	1996 Lunar New Year Cup
19.	25 August 1996	Osaka, Japan	Uruguay	3–?	5–3	Friendly
20.	6 December 1996	Al Ain, UAE	Syria	2–1	2–1	1996 AFC Asian Cup
21.	25 March 1997	Muscat, Oman	Macau	2–0	10–0	1998 FIFA World Cup qualification
22.	25 March 1997	Muscat, Oman	Macau	3–0	10–0	1998 FIFA World Cup qualification
23.	25 March 1997	Muscat, Oman	Macau	6–0	10–0	1998 FIFA World Cup qualification
24.	27 March 1997	Muscat, Oman	Nepal	2–0	6–0	1998 FIFA World Cup qualification
25.	27 March 1997	Muscat, Oman	Nepal	3–0	6–0	1998 FIFA World Cup qualification
26.	27 March 1997	Muscat, Oman	Nepal	5–0	6–0	1998 FIFA World Cup qualification
27.	8 November 1997	Tokyo, Japan	Kazakhstan	5–1	5–1	1998 FIFA World Cup qualification

== Managerial statistics ==
Update; October 2, 2019

Team	From	To	Record				
Team	From	To	G	W	D	L	Win %
Yokohama FC	2006	2007	69	29	17	23	42.03
Tokyo Verdy	2009	2009	44	17	9	18	38.64
Roasso Kumamoto	2010	2012	116	42	34	40	36.21
V-Varen Nagasaki	2013	2018	244	88	71	85	36.07
Omiya Ardija	2019	2020	34	16	12	6	47.06
Total			507	192	143	172	37.87

== Honors ==
Japan

- 1992 Asian Cup
- Dynasty Cup: 1992

Individual

- Dynasty Cup top scorer:1992
