= Eul-yong Ta =

South Korean internet phenomenon

Lee Eul-yong during the incident, with Li Yi (#11) on the ground and Yang Chen (#22) in the background

Eul-yong Ta (Korean: 을용타; Hanja: 乙容打) is a South Korean internet phenomenon and meme referring to an on-field incident between footballers Lee Eul-yong and Li Yi that occurred during a June 2003 football match between South Korea and China at the 2003 East Asian Football Championship.

Eul-yong Ta is a combination of [Lee] Eul-yong and the Hanja character ta (打), which roughly translates "to strike" or"blow" in Korean.

== Background ==
=== Koreaphobia ===
"Koreaphobia" (Korean: 공한증; Chinese: 恐韩症) is a term coined by Chinese journalists to describe the expectation that the Chinese national team will lose against Korea. As of July 2026, both nations have played against each other 39 times, with China only winning twice.

=== Anti-Chinese sentiment in Korea ===
The Korean media has said that the popularity of Eul-yong Ta is a result of anger over Chinese-Korean geographical disputes. Prior to the time of the match, South Korea had been involved in geographical disputes with China regarding Goguryeo, Jiandao, and Northeast Project of the Chinese Academy of Social Sciences. In 1998, a Chinese goalkeeper injured Hwang Sun-Hong, the main forward for the national team until his retirement in 2003. This prevented Hwang from playing in the 1998 World Cup in France.

=== The match ===
The two countries faced each other during the inaugural 2003 East Asian Cup. During the match, South Korea was winning 1–0 after the first half, as Yoo Sang-Chul headed the ball passed by Lee.

In the second half of the game, Chinese forward Li Yi deliberately kicked Lee's right shin after Lee completed a pass. Having recovered from a recent ankle injury, Lee was upset at Li's foul play and slapped Li on the back of his head, thereafter which Li Yi started to roll on the ground grabbing his head. A brief confrontation between the two teams followed, resulting in some physical contact but not a full-on scuffle. The referee awarded a yellow card for Li (simulation) and a red card for Lee (violence).

== Reaction and influence ==
Mini-Me casts an evil glance in front of Li Yi.

When Lee received a red card for violence, the Korean media accused Li Yi of "Hollywood action." At the same time, the media described Lee's expression in the picture as "proud" and "remorseless." The picture of Li Yi painfully clasping his head in front of Lee who is casting an angry glance at him, accompanied by a video clip of the incident, spread out through the Internet.

Korean websites, especially DC Inside known for high-level digital image editing and digital photography, began to photoshop and produce numerous parodies to ridicule the incident. Initially, the photoshopped works showed Lee holding a hammer or a chainsaw. Photoshopped works of the Korean footballer holding a Korean history textbook in front of the Chinese and another picture of Lee in Ŭlchi Mundŏk's armor have also surfaced on the internet.

Gradually, the parodies grew more complex over time as they were altered to resemble movie posters, and statues. Examples of parodies include pictures of Lee holding an electric saw before the Chinese, driving a crane towards Li, and Lee in Goku's costume in his Super Saiyan form. As of June 2006, the number of parodies have exceeded 200. Less frequently, the Chinese athlete (Yang Chen) in the background has been the subject of photoshopping.

Eul-yong Ta has been used to portray anti-Chinese sentiments and other social and political issues of South Korea such as strained relations between Korea and Japan. Eul-yong Ta became popular once again when South Korean gymnast Yang Tae Young lost to Paul Hamm in 2004 Summer Olympics. New parodies continued to be made after 2006 World Cup when Korea lost in a match against Switzerland.

Eul-yong Ta influenced new terms such as Eul-yong Chook and "Zidane-Ta" in South Korea when Zinedine Zidane headbutted Marco Materazzi during the final round of the 2006 World Cup.

=== Lee's reaction ===
Lee Eul-yong had seen the parodies of Eul-yong Ta "just once." He regrets the incident and has said that he should have controlled his temper as a veteran on the field. To a question asking him whether he was offended, he responded that he was not offended by the parodies and content "as long as people laughed from the parodies." (그런 건 없다. 사람들이 그걸로 재미있으면 됐다.)

In 2016, Lee featured in a commercial for Canon Korea along with his former international teammate Ahn Jung-hwan, recreating the incident but with Lee slapping Ahn's head instead.

=== Eul-yong Chook ===
In late 2005, another picture of Lee began to surface on the internet, which showed him in Bucheon FC's uniform performing a mid-air kick during the match against Suwon Samsung Bluewings. Like Eul-yong Ta, the picture became subject to parodies which include a photoshopped picture of Lee kicking Junichiro Koizumi to reflect the anti-Japanese sentiment in Korea and also Apolo Anton Ohno.

== See also ==
- Anti-Chinese sentiment in Korea
- Lee Eul-yong
- China–South Korea football rivalry
