= Tim Bredbury =

Hong Kongese footballer

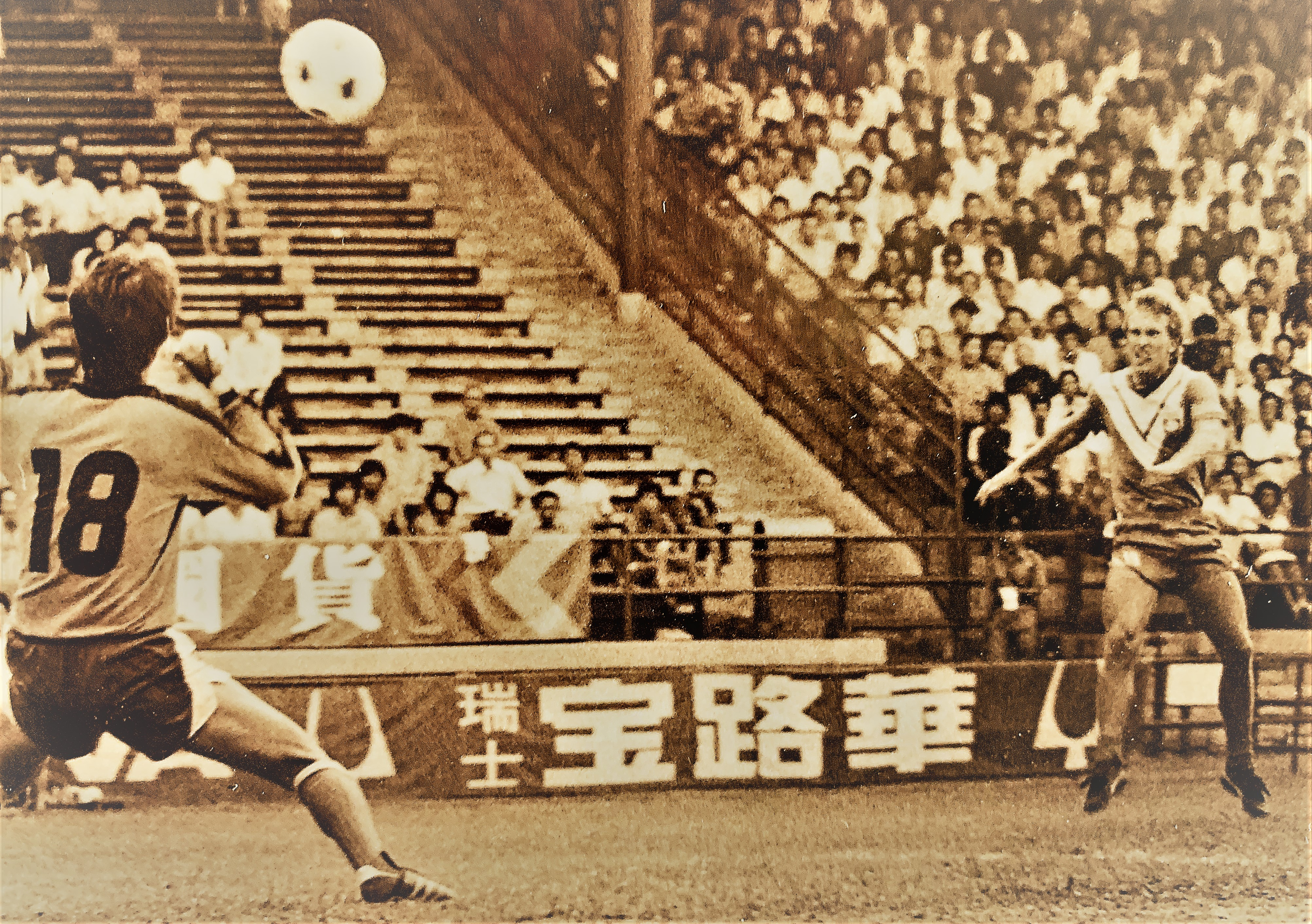

Personal information
- Full name: Timothy Aston Bredbury
- Date of birth: 25 April 1963 (age 63)
- Place of birth: British Hong Kong
- Height: 5 ft 8 in (1.73 m)
- Position: Forward

Youth career
- 1979–1982: Liverpool

Senior career*
Years	Team	Apps	(Gls)
1982	Ryoden	4	(13)
1982–1984	Seiko	34	(15)
1985–1986	Rangers (HKG)		
1986–1990	South China		(61)
1990–1991	Lai Sun	29	(21)
1991–1992	Sydney Olympic	24	(15)
1992	Selangor	18	(11)
1993	Sabah	10	(3)
1993	South China	3	(1)
1993–1994	Voicelink	11	(6)
1994–1995	Sing Tao	24	(8)
1995–1996	Frankwell	14	(3)
1996–1999	Instant-Dict		

International career
1986–1999	Hong Kong	34	(14)

Managerial career
- 2006: Rangers (HKG)
- 2007: Tai Po
- 2007–2008: Rangers (HKG)
- 2011–2012: Rangers
- 2012–2013: Sun Hei
- 2007–2013: Kitchee (academy coach)
- 2012–2013: Tai Chung
- 2016–2017: HKFC U18 Team & HKFC Vets Team (HKFC Soccer 7's 2016/2017)
- 2017–2018: Kitchee (U14 Team)
- 2018–2019: Kitchee (assistant technical director)
- 2019–2020: Kowloon
- 2023: Sham Shui Po (assistant coach)
- 2024: Rangers (HKG)
- * Club domestic league appearances and goals

Timothy Aston Bredbury (Chinese: 巴貝利; born 25 April 1963) is a Hong Kong professional football coach and former professional footballer who played as a forward. Bredbury is a UEFA/AFC A-licensed coach.

== Early life ==
Bredbury was born in Hong Kong to British parents from Liverpool. His father John moved to Hong Kong as a fireman working for the Hong Kong Fire Services Department. He went to Glenealy School and King George V School. As a talented sportsman, he represented Hong Kong in rugby sevens at the 1979 Rosslyn Park World Schools Sevens, as well as in field hockey and swimming. He has three siblings who have also represented Hong Kong at field hockey and rugby.

== Club career ==
Bredbury began his football career with Liverpool in 1979, signing as an apprentice professional. After two years, he was offered full professional terms on a one-year contract.

Bredbury stayed at the Liverpool reserve team for three years, winning the Central League twice, the Liverpool Senior Cup and the Nice International Invitation Tournament in France.

At the end of his contract, Bredbury was then approached by Ryoden. He decided to take the offer and return to Hong Kong. He scored 13 goals in 4 games and was soon signed up with Hong Kong league giants Seiko, playing alongside the likes of Arie Haan, Theo de Jong, Dick Nanninga, René van de Kerkhof, Johnny Rep, Peter Bodak and Benny Wendt in a highly successful 2-year period winning the league twice.

Between 1982 and 1999, Bredbury played for various clubs in Hong Kong, such as Hong Kong Rangers, South China, Lai Sun, Frankwell, Sing Tao and Instant-Dict, as well as Australian club Sydney Olympic FC and Malaysian clubs Selangor FA and Sabah FA.

Bredbury was the joint top goalscorer in Hong Kong on two separate occasions and finished tied (with Dale Tempest) in the Hong Kong First Division League with 21 goals during the 1990–1991 season with Lai Sun FC before leaving Hong Kong and signing for Sydney Olympic in Australia.

In his debut season, Bredbury also finished as joint top scorer (with Kimon Taliadoros) in the National Soccer League with Sydney Olympic FC during the 1991–1992 season scoring 15 goals in 24 appearances.

Bredbury also had two successful seasons playing in Malaysia with giants Selangor FC and second division side Sabah FC. At Sabah, Bredbury helped the club reach the FA Cup Final, the first time a second division side had achieved this feat.

At the club level, Bredbury played against top club sides from around the world, including Corinthians, Lucky Gold Star (now Seoul), Odense, Sampdoria, A.C. Milan, Everton, Aston Villa, Coventry, Sparta Prague, Brøndby and Chelsea.

In 1986, Bredbury was invited to join the Hong Kong national team and, in a career that spanned over 10 years, he played in the World Cup qualifying rounds, Olympics qualifying rounds and Asian Games in Yokohama, Japan. He played over 30 representative games scoring 14 goals.

Bredbury was also a regular member of the Hong Kong League XI side competing in the Carlsberg Cup and Dynasty Cup tournaments playing against such sides as Denmark, Paraguay (where he was "Man of the Match"), Yugoslavia, Japan, South Korea, Nigeria, Sweden, Romania, Switzerland, China.

In addition to his professional playing career, Bredbury is also a fully qualified English Football Association coach and gained his UEFA A Licence in December 2011 through the English Football Association. In 2016, he also received recognition through the AFC and now holds the equivalent license.

Bredbury is a member of the English Football Association Coaches Association and also a former member of the English Professional Footballers Association.

== Post-playing career ==
Bredbury worked as a marketing manager, professional coach, sports journalist, event organiser and television presenter on ATV's World channel.

== Managerial career ==
On 30 June 2024, Brebdury was appointed as the head coach of Rangers.

== Career statistics ==
=== International goals ===
No.	Date	Venue	Opponent	Score	Result	Competition
1.	4 June 1989	Kowloon, Hong Kong	Indonesia	1–0	1–1	1990 FIFA World Cup qualification
2.	2 July 1989	Pyongyang, North Korea	North Korea	1–1	1–4	1990 FIFA World Cup qualification
3.	1 October 1994	Hiroshima, Japan	Malaysia	1–2	3–4	1994 Asian Games
4.	1 October 1994	Hiroshima, Japan	Malaysia	2–2	3–4	1994 Asian Games
5.	1 October 1994	Hiroshima, Japan	Malaysia	3–4	3–4	1994 Asian Games
6.	9 October 1994	Hiroshima, Japan	Saudi Arabia	1–0	1–2	1994 Asian Games
7.	23 February 1995	Kowloon, Hong Kong	South Korea	2–2	2–3	1995 Dynasty Cup
8.	30 January 1996	Kowloon, Hong Kong	Philippines	2–0	8–0	1996 AFC Asian Cup qualification
9.	30 January 1996	Kowloon, Hong Kong	Philippines	3–0	8–0	1996 AFC Asian Cup qualification
10.	1 February 1996	Kowloon, Hong Kong	Macau	2–1	4–1	1996 AFC Asian Cup qualification
11.	1 February 1996	Kowloon, Hong Kong	Macau	3–1	4–1	1996 AFC Asian Cup qualification
12.	1 February 1996	Kowloon, Hong Kong	Macau	4–1	4–1	1996 AFC Asian Cup qualification

== Honours ==
- 7 Hong Kong First Division League
- 1 Hong Kong Second Division League
- 2 Hong Kong Senior Shield
- 4 Hong Kong FA Cup
- 5 Hong Kong Viceroy Cup
- 2 Lunar New Year Cup
- 3 Guangdong-Hong Kong Cup
- 1 Hong Kong Junior Viceroy Cup
- 2 Central League Champions - UK
- 1 Liverpool Senior Cup Champions - UK
- 1 Nice Invitation Cup Champions - Fra
- 2 Seven a Side Champions - HK
- 3 Top Goal Scorer - HK
- 1 NSL Joint Top Goalscorer - Aust
