= Kim Joo-sung =

South Korean footballer (born 1964)

Personal information
- Full name: Kim Joo-sung
- Date of birth: 17 January 1964 (age 62)
- Place of birth: Yangyang, Gangwon, South Korea
- Height: 1.77 m (5 ft 10 in)
- Position: Attacking midfielder

Youth career
- 1977–1979: Seongsu Middle School
- 1980–1982: Choongang High School

College career
Years	Team	Apps	(Gls)
1983–1986	Chosun University		

Senior career*
Years	Team	Apps	(Gls)
1987–1999	Busan Daewoo Royals	198	(34)
1992–1994	→ VfL Bochum (loan)	34	(4)
Total		232	(38)

International career
1984	South Korea U20		
1984–1987	South Korea B		
1985–1996	South Korea	76	(14)
Medal record
Men's football
Representing South Korea
Summer Universiade
Silver medal – second place	1987 Zagreb
Asian Games
Gold medal – first place	1986 Seoul
Bronze medal – third place	1990 Beijing
AFC Asian Cup
Runner-up	1988 Qatar
- * Club domestic league appearances and goals

- Kim Joo-sung
- Hangul: 김주성
- Hanja: 金鑄城
- RR: Gim Juseong
- MR: Kim Chusŏng

Kim Joo-sung (born 17 January 1964) is a South Korean former footballer who mainly played as an attacking midfielder. An icon of the Daewoo Royals with a brief stint in Germany for VfL Bochum, Kim was also a long-time South Korean national team captain and finished second in the IFFHS Asia's Player of the Century polls.

== Club career ==
In December 1986, Kim signed for K League club Daewoo Royals prior to his graduation from Chosun University. In his first professional season, he won the league title and was named the league's Rookie of the Year. After gaining one more league title in 1991, he joined Bundesliga club VfL Bochum on loan in June 1992.

In his first season at Bochum, Kim struggled to adapt to the Bundesliga and suffered relegation. He helped Bochum win the 2. Bundesliga title the next season before coming back to South Korea at Daewoo's request.

Kim changed his position to sweeper in the last years of his career, and became the league's MVP when Daewoo won another league title in 1997. Two years later, he announced his retirement, with Daewoo also retiring his number 16.

== International career ==
Kim started to be selected for the South Korea national team during the 1986 FIFA World Cup qualifiers. Following the World Cup qualifiers, he played for South Korea at several competitions including the 1986 FIFA World Cup and the 1988 Summer Olympics. In Asia, he won a gold medal at the 1986 Asian Games, and received the MVP award at the 1988 AFC Asian Cup. While receiving attention internationally, he privately negotiated with Austrian Bundesliga side Swarovski Tirol in May 1988, but the contract was invalidated by the Korea Amateur Sports Association, which did not allow medalists exempted from compulsory military service to play abroad for five years.

After remaining in South Korea, Kim led his country to win the Asian qualifying tournament of the 1990 FIFA World Cup easily without defeat, and was selected as the tournament's best player. Despite being criticised for his poor performances at the 1990 World Cup by the press, he was voted Asian Footballer of the Year for three consecutive years from 1989 to 1991. In October 1991, he played for the official World XI against Germany in a charity match organised by FIFA.

== After retirement ==
In September 2003, Kim attended a sports management masters course at De Montfort University, Leicester until February 2004, when his studies took him to Switzerland.

== Career statistics ==
=== Club ===
Appearances and goals by club, season and competition
Club	Season	League			National cup		League cup		Other		Total	
Club	Season	Division	Apps	Goals	Apps	Goals	Apps	Goals	Apps	Goals	Apps	Goals
Busan Daewoo Royals	1987	K League	28	10	? (Note: Appearance(s) in Korean National Championship)	?	—		—		28	10
Busan Daewoo Royals	1988	K League	10	3	?	?	—		—		10	3
Busan Daewoo Royals	1989	K League	8	2	?	?	—		—		8	2
Busan Daewoo Royals	1990	K League	9	2	—		—		—		9	2
Busan Daewoo Royals	1991	K League	37	14	—		—		—		37	14
Busan Daewoo Royals	1992	K League	8	0	—		1	0	—		9	0
Busan Daewoo Royals	1994	K League	3	0	—		0	0	—		3	0
Busan Daewoo Royals	1995	K League	25	1	—		5	1	—		30	2
Busan Daewoo Royals	1996	K League	20	2	? (Note: Appearance(s) in Korean FA Cup)	?	6	0	—		26	2
Busan Daewoo Royals	1997	K League	16	0	?	?	18	0	—		34	0
Busan Daewoo Royals	1998	K League	13	0	?	?	15	0	—		28	0
Busan Daewoo Royals	1999	K League	21	0	?	?	7	0	5 (Note: Appearances in K League Championship)	0	33	0
Busan Daewoo Royals	Total		198	34	?	?	52	1	5	0	255	35
VfL Bochum (loan)	1992–93	Bundesliga	13	0	0	0	—		—		13	0
VfL Bochum (loan)	1993–94	2. Bundesliga	21	4	1	0	—		—		22	4
VfL Bochum (loan)	Total		34	4	1	0	0	0	—		35	4
Career total			232	38	1	0	52	1	5	0	290	39

=== International ===
Appearances and goals by national team and year
National team	Year	Apps	Goals
South Korea	1985	8	3
South Korea	1986	10	1
South Korea	1987	5	1
South Korea	1988	6	2
South Korea	1989	8	1
South Korea	1990	18	4
South Korea	1991	5	1
South Korea	1992	0	0
South Korea	1993	4	0
South Korea	1994	5	1
South Korea	1995	1	0
South Korea	1996	6	0
Career total		76	14

Appearances and goals by competition
Competition	Apps	Goals
Friendlies	14	3
Minor competitions	19	3
Asian Games	11	3
AFC Asian Cup	9	2
Summer Olympics	1	0
FIFA World Cup qualification	13	3
FIFA World Cup	9	0
Total	76	14

Results list South Korea's goal tally first.

List of international goals scored by Kim Joo-sung
No.	Date	Venue	Cap	Opponent	Score	Result	Competition
1	21 July 1985	Seoul, South Korea	1	Indonesia	2–0	2–0	1986 FIFA World Cup qualification
2	30 July 1985	Jakarta, Indonesia	2	Indonesia	4–0	4–1	1986 FIFA World Cup qualification
3	3 December 1985	Los Angeles, United States	5	Mexico	1–0	1–2	Friendly
4	28 September 1986	Seoul, South Korea	15	China	2–1	4–2	1986 Asian Games
5	14 June 1987	Daejeon, South Korea	21	Thailand	2–0	4–2	1987 Korea Cup
6	6 December 1988	Doha, Qatar	26	Japan	2–0	2–0	1988 AFC Asian Cup
7	9 December 1988	Doha, Qatar	27	Qatar	2–0	3–2	1988 AFC Asian Cup
8	20 October 1989	Singapore	35	China	1–0	1–0	1990 FIFA World Cup qualification
9	28 July 1990	Beijing, China	44	Japan	2–0	2–0	1990 Dynasty Cup
10	23 September 1990	Beijing, China	49	Singapore	2–0	7–0	1990 Asian Games
11	23 September 1990	Beijing, China	49	Singapore	5–0	7–0	1990 Asian Games
12	11 October 1990	Pyongyang, North Korea	54	North Korea	1–0	1–2	Friendly
13	9 June 1991	Seoul, South Korea	57	Indonesia	2–0	3–0	1991 Korea Cup
14	11 June 1994	Duncanville, United States	66	Honduras	3–0	3–0	Friendly

== Honours ==
Busan Daewoo Royals

- K League 1: 1987, 1991, 1997
- Korean National Championship: 1989
- Korean League Cup: 1997, 1997+, 1998+

VfL Bochum

- 2. Bundesliga: 1993–94

South Korea B

- Summer Universiade silver medal: 1987

South Korea

- Asian Games: 1986
- Dynasty Cup: 1990
- AFC Asian Cup runner-up: 1988

Individual

- FIFA World XI: 1991
- AFC Asian Cup Most Valuable Player: 1988
- AFC Asian Cup Team of the Tournament: 1988
- FIFA World Cup qualification (AFC) Most Outstanding Player: 1989
- IFFHS Asian Men's Player of the Year: 1989, 1990, 1991
- IFFHS Asia's Player of the 20th Century runner-up: 1999
- IFFHS Asian Men's Team of the 20th Century: 2021
- MasterCard Asian/Oceanian Team of the 20th Century: 1998
- Dynasty Cup Most Valuable Player: 1990
- Korean FA Best XI: 1985, 1986, 1987, 1988
- Korean FA Most Valuable Player: 1991
- K League Rookie of the Year: 1987
- K League 1 Best XI: 1987, 1991, 1996, 1997, 1999
- K League All-Star: 1991, 1995, 1997, 1998
- K League 1 Most Valuable Player: 1997
- K League '90s All-Star Team: 2003
- K League 30th Anniversary Best XI: 2013
- K League Hall of Fame: 2025

Awards
Preceded by Kim Hyun-seok	K-League Most Valuable Player; 1997	Succeeded by Ko Jong-soo
Preceded by Ham Hyun-gi	K-League Rookie of the Year; 1987	Succeeded by Hwangbo Kwan
