= 1995 Dynasty Cup =

Tournament details
- Host country: Hong Kong
- Dates: 19–26 February 1995
- Teams: 4 (from 1 confederation)
- Venue: 2 (in 1 host city)

Final positions
- Champions: Japan (2nd title)
- Runners-up: South Korea
- Third place: Hong Kong
- Fourth place: China

Tournament statistics
- Matches played: 8
- Goals scored: 18 (2.25 per match)
- Attendance: 148,188 (18,524 per match)
- Top scorer: (Japan) Hisashi Kurosaki (4 goals)

The 1995 Dynasty Cup was a football competition for the top four teams of East Asia. The third edition of the Dynasty Cup was held from 19 to 26 February 1995 in British Hong Kong which was under control of United Kingdom. The competition was won by Japan for the second straight time.

== Participating teams ==
- China
- Hong Kong
- Japan
- South Korea

== Venues ==
Hong Kong
So Kon Po	Mong Kok
Hong Kong Stadium	Mong Kok Stadium
Capacity: 40,000	Capacity: 8,500

== Results ==
=== Group stage ===
Team	Pld	W	D	L	GF	GA	GD	Pts
Japan	3	2	1	0	6	2	+4	7
South Korea	3	1	2	0	4	3	+1	5
China	3	0	2	1	1	2	–1	2
Hong Kong	3	0	1	2	2	6	–4	1

19 February 1995

Hong Kong	0–3	Japan
		Kurosaki 42', 78'; Hashiratani 70'

Hong Kong Stadium, So Kon Po
Attendance: 29,753
Referee: Russamee Jindamai (Thailand)
19 February 1995

China	0–0	South Korea

Hong Kong Stadium, So Kon Po
Attendance: 24,875
Referee: Mohamed Nazri Abdullah (Malaysia)

21 February 1995

South Korea	1–1	Japan
Lee Woo-young 67'		Kurosaki 47'

Hong Kong Stadium, So Kon Po
Attendance: 14,292
Referee: Nimal Wickeramatunge (Sri Lanka)
21 February 1995

Hong Kong	0–0	China

Hong Kong Stadium, So Kon Po
Attendance: 14,292
Referee: Nik Ahmad Yaakub (Malaysia)

23 February 1995

Japan	2–1	China
Fujita 16'; Kurosaki 22'		Gao Feng 55'

Mong Kok Stadium, Mong Kok
Attendance: 3,417
Referee: Nimal Wickeramatunge (Sri Lanka)
23 February 1995

Hong Kong	2–3	South Korea
Greer 20'; Bredbury 64'		Lee Ki-hyung 15'; Ko Jeong-woon 39'; Choi Yong-soo 88'

Mong Kok Stadium, Mong Kok
Attendance: 6,223
Referee: Russamee Jindamai (Thailand)

=== Finals stage ===
==== Third place match ====
26 February 1995

Hong Kong	1–1	China
L. Santos 2'		Li Bing 32'
Penalties
Tempest (penalty missed); Bredbury (penalty scored); Tam Siu Wai (penalty scored); L. Santos (penalty scored)	3–1	(penalty scored) Gao Feng; (penalty missed) Zhu Qi; (penalty missed) Li Bing; (penalty missed) Liu Yue

Hong Kong Stadium, So Kon Po
Attendance: 27,668
Referee: Russamee Jindamai (Thailand)

==== Final ====
26 February 1995

Japan	2–2	South Korea
Fukuda 2'; Yamaguchi 87'		Lee Ki-hyung 27', 90+'
Penalties
Hashiratani (penalty scored); Kitazawa (penalty scored); Fukuda (penalty scored); Moriyasu (penalty scored); Masami Ihara (penalty scored)	5–3	(penalty scored) Yoo Sang-cheol; (penalty missed) Choi Yong-soo; (penalty scored) Lee Ki-hyung; (penalty scored) Choi Sung-yong

Hong Kong Stadium, So Kon Po
Attendance: 27,668
Referee: Nik Ahmad Yaakub (Malaysia)

Japan	South Korea

1995 Dynasty Cup winners

Japan
Second title

== Awards ==
Top 11
Goalkeeper	Defenders	Midfielders	Forwards
(China) Ou Chuliang	(Japan) Hiroshige Yanagimoto (Japan) Tetsuji Hashiratani (Japan) Masami Ihara (South Korea) Ko Jeong-woon	(South Korea) Lee Ki-hyung (Hong Kong) Leslie Santos (Japan) Hajime Moriyasu (Japan) Masakiyo Maezono	(Japan) Hisashi Kurosaki (South Korea) Choi Yong-soo

Fair Play Trophy
Japan
