= 1998 Dynasty Cup =

Tournament details
- Host country: Japan
- Dates: 1–7 March 1998
- Teams: 4 (from 1 confederation)
- Venue: 2 (in 2 host cities)

Final positions
- Champions: Japan (3rd title)
- Runners-up: China
- Third place: South Korea
- Fourth place: Hong Kong

Tournament statistics
- Matches played: 6
- Goals scored: 16 (2.67 per match)
- Attendance: 270,501 (45,084 per match)
- Top scorer: (China) Li Bing (3 goals)
- All statistics correct as of 9 January 2010.

The 1998 Dynasty Cup, also known as The 4th AFC Marlboro Dynasty Cup '98 due to sponsorship reasons, was a football competition for the top four teams of East Asia. The fourth and final edition of the Dynasty Cup was held from March 1, 1998, to March 7, 1998, in Tokyo and Yokohama, Japan. The competition was won by Japan for the third straight time.

== Participating teams ==
- China
- Hong Kong
- Japan
- South Korea

== Venues ==
Tokyo	Yokohama
National Stadium	International Stadium
Capacity: 57,363	Capacity: 72,327

== Matches ==
Team	Pld	W	D	L	GF	GA	GD	Pts
Japan	3	2	0	1	7	4	+3	6
China	3	2	0	1	4	2	+2	6
South Korea	3	2	0	1	4	3	+1	6
Hong Kong	3	0	0	3	1	7	–6	0

1 March 1998

Japan	2–1	South Korea
Nakayama 18'; Jo 89'		Lee Sang-yoon 21'

International Stadium Yokohama
Attendance: 59,380
Referee: Ali Bujsaim (UAE)
1 March 1998

China	1–0	Hong Kong
Zhang Enhua 59'

International Stadium Yokohama
Attendance: 40,000
Referee: Masayoshi Okada (Japan)

4 March 1998

Japan	5–1	Hong Kong
Nakata 22', 36' (pen.); Masuda 40'; Nanami 71'; Lopes 85'		Tempest 34'

International Stadium Yokohama
Attendance: 50,743
Referee: Abdul Rahman Al-Zeid (Saudi Arabia)
4 March 1998

South Korea	2–1	China
Choi Sung-yong 38'; Lee Sang-yoon 42'		Li Bing 15'

International Stadium Yokohama
Attendance: 39,484
Referee: Pirom Un-Prasert (Thailand)

7 March 1998

Japan	0–2	China
		Li Bing 9', 50'

National Stadium, Tokyo
Attendance: 53,226
Referee: Abdul Rahman Al-Zeid (Saudi Arabia)
7 March 1998

South Korea	1–0	Hong Kong
Choi Yong-soo 90'

National Stadium, Tokyo
Attendance: 27,668
Referee: Masayoshi Okada (Japan)

1998 Dynasty Cup winners

Japan
Third title
