= Jung Jae-kwon =

South Korean footballer (born 2008)

Jung Jae-Kwon 정재권
Personal information
- Full name: Jung Jae-Kwon
- Date of birth: November 5, 1970 (age 55)
- Place of birth: South Korea
- Height: 1.70 m (5 ft 7 in)
- Position: Left winger

Team information
- Current team: Laos U20 (head coach)

Youth career
- 1990–1992: Hanyang University

Senior career*
Years	Team	Apps	(Gls)
1993	Industrial Bank of Korea		
1994–1999	Pusan Daewoo Royals	99	(20)
1998	→ Vitória FC (Loan)	5	(1)
2000–2001	Pohang Steelers	17	(1)

International career
1992	South Korea U-23	10	(3)
1992–1997	South Korea	15	(3)

Managerial career
- 2002: Dong-eui University
- 2003–2007: Dongnae Middle School
- 2008–: Hanyang University
- 2024: Laos U20 (interim)
- * Club domestic league appearances and goals

Jung Jae-Kwon is a South Korean footballer. Since 2008, he has played for Seoul United in the Challengers League as well as coached Laos U20

== Club career ==
- 1993 Industrial Bank of Korea FC - (Semi-professional)
- 1994-1999 Pusan Daewoo Royals
- 1998 Vitória FC - on loan
- 2000-2001 Pohang Steelers

== International goals ==
Results list South Korea's goal tally first.

Date	Venue	Opponent	Score	Result	Competition
August 26, 1992	Beijing, China	China	1 goal	2-0	1992 Dynasty Cup
August 29, 1992	Beijing, China	Japan	1 goal	2-2 (2-4 PSO)	1992 Dynasty Cup
June 3, 1993	Seoul, South Korea	Hong Kong	1 goal	4-1	1994 FIFA World Cup qualification
