= 1990 Dynasty Cup =

Tournament details
- Host country: China
- Dates: 27 July – 3 August 1990
- Teams: 4 (from 1 confederation)
- Venue: 1 (in 1 host city)

Final positions
- Champions: South Korea (1st title)
- Runners-up: China
- Third place: North Korea
- Fourth place: Japan

Tournament statistics
- Matches played: 7
- Goals scored: 10 (1.43 per match)
- Best player: (South Korea) Kim Joo-Sung

The 1990 Dynasty Cup was a football competition for the top four teams of East Asia. The first edition of the Dynasty Cup was held from 27 July 1990 to 3 August 1990 in China. The competition was won by South Korea.

== Participating teams ==
- China
- Japan
- South Korea
- North Korea

== Results ==
=== Group stage ===
Team	Pld	W	D	L	GF	GA	GD	Pts
South Korea	3	3	0	0	4	0	+4	6
China	3	2	0	1	3	1	+2	4
North Korea	3	1	0	2	1	3	–2	2
Japan	3	0	0	3	0	4	–4	0

27 July 1990

South Korea	2–0	Japan
Hwang Sun-Hong 34'; Kim Joo-Sung 66'

27 July 1990

China	2–0	North Korea
Gao Sheng 9'; Ma Lin 46'

29 July 1990

South Korea	1–0	North Korea
Hwangbo Kwan 89'

29 July 1990

China	1–0	Japan
Wu Qunli 77'

31 July 1990

North Korea	1–0	Japan
Ri Hyok-Chon 66'

31 July 1990

China	0–1	South Korea
		Lee Sang-Yoon 26'

=== Final ===
3 August 1990

China	1–1	South Korea
Mai Chao 61'		Hong Myung-Bo 22' (pen.)
Penalties
Wu Qunli (penalty scored); Li Hongbing (penalty scored); Mai Chao (penalty scored); Duan Ju (penalty scored); Xie Yuxin (penalty missed); Zhang Xiaowen (penalty missed); Guo Yijun (penalty missed)	4–5	(penalty scored) Hong Myung-Bo; (penalty scored) Choi Soon-ho; (penalty scored) Lee Young-jin; (penalty scored) Chung Yong-hwan; (penalty scored) Choi In-young; (penalty missed) Lee Sang-yoon; (penalty missed) Park Kyung-hoon

1990 Dynasty Cup winners

South Korea
First title
