= Wu Qunli =

Chinese footballer and coach

Wu Qunli 吴群立
Personal information
- Full name: Wu Qunli
- Date of birth: 20 March 1960 (age 66)
- Place of birth: Guangzhou, Guangdong, China
- Height: 1.75 m (5 ft 9 in)
- Positions: Left midfielder; striker

Senior career*
Years	Team	Apps	(Gls)
1983–1993	Guangzhou FC		
1994–1998	South China		
1998–1999	Golden		
2000–2001	Tung Po		

International career
1985–1993	China	36	(6)

Managerial career
- 2001–2002: Guangzhou FC (assistant)
- 2002: Guangzhou FC
- 2006: Hunan Billows
Medal record
Men's football
Representing China
AFC Asian Cup
Bronze medal – third place	1992 Japan	Team
University Games
Bronze medal – third place	1985 Kobe	Football
- * Club domestic league appearances and goals

Wu Qunli
- Simplified Chinese: 吴群立
Transcriptions
Standard Mandarin
- Hanyu Pinyin: Wú Qúnlì
- IPA: [ǔ tɕʰy̌n lî]
Yue: Cantonese
- Jyutping: Ng4 Kwan4 Lap6
- IPA: [ŋ̭̍ kʷʰɐ̏n lɐ̀p̚]

Wu Qunli (born 20 March 1960 in Guangzhou) is a Chinese football coach and former international midfield player. As a player he represented Guangzhou FC and Hong Kong First Division League side South China, while internationally he also played for his country in the 1988 Summer Olympics and 1992 AFC Asian Cup. Since retiring he would move into management where he returned to Guangzhou FC as an assistant before becoming their manager for a short spell.

== Playing career ==
Wu Qunli was born in the Baiyun District within Guangzhou and would join second-tier football club Guangzhou FC within the 1983 league season. He would soon see his club win promotion to the top tier at the end of the 1984 league season, via the Chinese FA Cup. The following season would see him called up to the Chinese national team for the first time where he would become a regular before playing with the senior team in the 1988 Summer Olympics. By the 1990 league season Guangzhou FC were in the second tier, however Wu made sure this was short lived and aided the club to a runners-up position and promotion back up to the top tier, this wouldn't go unnoticed and he personally won the Chinese footballer of the year award. By now Wu had become a vital member for his club and country and go on to lead China into the 1992 AFC Asian Cup where they came third.

With another Chinese footballer of the year award won at the end of the 1993 league season Wu would leave Guangzhou FC and join Hong Kong First Division League side South China in 1994. He would immediately make an impression within the team when he won the Hong Kong Viceroy Cup at the end of the 1993–94 league season. He would then be given the nickname of "Golden Left Foot" for he saved the team many times by scoring some great goals using his left foot. A Hong Kong Senior Shield and Hong Kong FA Cup at the end of the 1995-96 league season followed despite Wu missing six months after an injury sustained on 9 March 1996. With Wu winning the Hong Kong First Division League title at the end of the 1996–97 league season Wu would soon move to Golden and then Tung Po before he retired.

== Honours ==
=== Player ===
==== Club ====
South China

- Hong Kong First Division League: 1996–97
- Hong Kong Senior Shield: 1995–96, 1996–97
- Hong Kong Viceroy Cup: 1993–94, 1997–98
- Hong Kong FA Cup: 1995–96

==== International ====
- AFC Asian Cup: 1992 (Third)

==== Individual ====
- CFA Footballer of the Year: 1990, 1993
