= Choi Sung-yong =

South Korean footballer (born 1975)

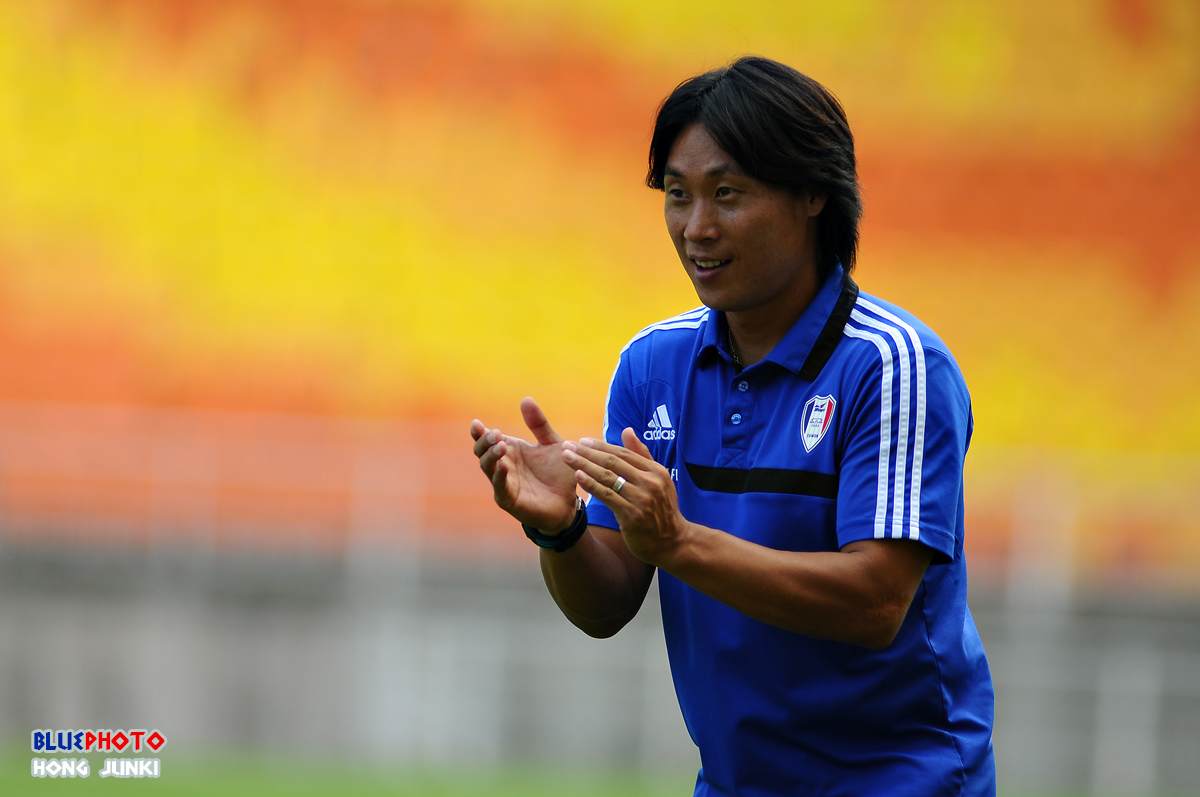
- Choi in 2013

Personal information
- Date of birth: 25 December 1975 (age 50)
- Place of birth: Masan, Gyeongnam, South Korea
- Height: 1.73 m (5 ft 8 in)
- Positions: Wing-back; midfielder

College career
Years	Team	Apps	(Gls)
1994–1996	Korea University		

Senior career*
Years	Team	Apps	(Gls)
1997–1998	Sangmu FC (draft)		
1999–2000	Vissel Kobe	51	(0)
2001	LASK Linz	19	(1)
2002–2006	Suwon Samsung Bluewings	78	(1)
2006–2007	Yokohama FC	22	(0)
2007	Ulsan Hyundai Horang-i	8	(0)
2008–2010	Thespa Kusatsu	48	(0)
Total		226	(2)

International career
1990	South Korea U17	1	(0)
1993	South Korea U20	3	(0)
1994–1996	South Korea U23	44	(0)
1995–2003	South Korea	65	(1)

Managerial career
- 2023: Suwon Samsung Bluewings (caretaker)
Medal record
Representing South Korea
Men's football
AFC Asian Cup
Bronze medal – third place	2000 Lebanon
AFC Youth Championship
Runner-up	1992 United Arab Emirates
- * Club domestic league appearances and goals

- Choi Sung-yong
- Hangul: 최성용
- Hanja: 崔成勇
- RR: Choe Seongyong
- MR: Ch'oe Sŏngyong

Choi Sung-yong (Korean: 최성용; born 25 December 1975) is a former South Korean footballer who played as a wing-back or midfielder. Known for his good stamina and concentration, Choi was noted for his ability for man-to-man defense. He performed a role to concentrate on marking Hidetoshi Nakata, considered the best Asian player at the time, when South Korea played against Japan in the late 1990s and early 2000s.

Choi played for the South Korea national team as a right-back in the 1998 FIFA World Cup. He was also selected for the national team for the 2002 FIFA World Cup, but didn't appear on the field at that time. After the 2002 World Cup, he joined Suwon Samsung Bluewings and helped the club win the K League title.

== Career statistics ==
=== Club ===
Appearances and goals by club, season and competition
Club	Season	League			National cup		League cup		Total	
Club	Season	Division	Apps	Goals	Apps	Goals	Apps	Goals	Apps	Goals
Vissel Kobe	1999	J1 League	26	0	1	0	1	0	28	0
Vissel Kobe	2000	J1 League	25	0	1	0	4	0	30	0
Vissel Kobe	Total		51	0	2	0	5	0	58	0
LASK Linz	2000–01	Austrian Bundesliga	13	1	1	0	—		14	1
LASK Linz	2001–02	Erste Division	6	0	0	0	—		6	0
LASK Linz	Total		19	1	1	0	—		20	1
Suwon Samsung Bluewings	2002	K League	11	0	?	?	—		11	0
Suwon Samsung Bluewings	2003	K League	23	0	1	0	—		24	0
Suwon Samsung Bluewings	2004	K League	20	1	0	0	12	0	32	1
Suwon Samsung Bluewings	2005	K League	16	0	3	0	7	0	26	0
Suwon Samsung Bluewings	2006	K League	8	0	0	0	4	0	12	0
Suwon Samsung Bluewings	Total		78	1	4	0	23	0	105	1
Yokohama FC	2006	J2 League	22	0	1	0	—		23	0
Ulsan Hyundai Horang-i	2007	K League	8	0	0	0	0	0	8	0
Thespa Kusatsu	2008	J2 League	37	0	1	0	—		38	0
Thespa Kusatsu	2009	J2 League	7	0	2	0	—		9	0
Thespa Kusatsu	2010	J2 League	4	0	0	0	—		4	0
Thespa Kusatsu	Total		48	0	3	0	—		51	0
Career total			226	2	11	0	28	0	265	2

=== International ===
Appearances and goals by national team and year
National team	Year	Apps	Goals
South Korea	1995	3	0
South Korea	1997	12	0
South Korea	1998	24	1
South Korea	1999	2	0
South Korea	2000	5	0
South Korea	2001	8	0
South Korea	2002	8	0
South Korea	2003	3	0
Career total		65	1

Scores and results list South Korea's goal tally first, score column indicates score after each Choi goal.

List of international goals scored by Choi Sung-yong
No.	Date	Venue	Opponent	Score	Result	Competition
1	4 March 1998	International Stadium Yokohama, Yokohama, Japan	China	1–1	2–1	1998 Dynasty Cup

== Honours ==
Suwon Samsung Bluewings

- K League: 2004
- Korean FA Cup: 2002
- Korean League Cup: 2005
- Korean Super Cup: 2005
- Asian Club Championship: 2001–02
- Asian Super Cup: 2002
- A3 Champions Cup: 2005

Yokohama FC

- J2 League: 2006

Ulsan Hyundai Horang-i

- Korean League Cup: 2007

South Korea U20

- AFC Youth Championship runner-up: 1992

South Korea

- AFC Asian Cup third place: 2000

Individual

- K League All-Star: 2002, 2005
