= Lee Sang-yoon (footballer) =

South Korean footballer

Personal information
- Full name: Lee Sang-yoon
- Date of birth: 10 April 1969 (age 57)
- Place of birth: Daejeon, South Korea
- Height: 1.79 m (5 ft 10 1/2 in)
- Position: Forward

College career
Years	Team	Apps	(Gls)
1986–1989	Konkuk University		

Senior career*
Years	Team	Apps	(Gls)
1990–1998	Cheonan Ilhwa Chunma	201	(51)
1999	→ Lorient (loan)	4	(0)
1999–2000	Seongnam Ilhwa Chunma	38	(12)
2001	Bucheon SK	16	(1)
Total		259	(64)

International career
1990–1998	South Korea	30	(12)

Managerial career
- 2012: Chungnam Ilhwa Chunma
- 2013–2014: Seongnam FC (assistant)
- 2014: Seongnam FC (caretaker)
- 2015–2016: Konkuk University
- * Club domestic league appearances and goals

Lee Sang-yoon (born 10 April 1969) is a South Korean football commentator and former player who mostly played for Ilhwa Chunma. He was also a member of the South Korea national team at the 1990 and 1998 FIFA World Cups. After becoming a commentator, he is nicknamed "Gareth Sang-yoon" due to his husky voice which sounds like he has phlegm (called "garae" in South Korea) in his throat.

== Career statistics ==
=== Club ===
Appearances and goals by club, season and competition
Season	Club	League			National cup		League cup		Continental		Other		Total	
Season	Club	Division	Apps	Goals	Apps	Goals	Apps	Goals	Apps	Goals	Apps	Goals	Apps	Goals
Cheonan Ilhwa Chunma	1990	K League	14	4	—		—		—		—		14	4
Cheonan Ilhwa Chunma	1991	K League	35	15	—		—		—		—		35	15
Cheonan Ilhwa Chunma	1992	K League	28	9	—		9	4	—		—		37	13
Cheonan Ilhwa Chunma	1993	K League	29	7	—		3	0	—		—		32	7
Cheonan Ilhwa Chunma	1994	K League	27	6	—		4	0	? (Note: Appearances in Asian Club Championship)	?	—		31	6
Cheonan Ilhwa Chunma	1995	K League	24	1	—		0	0	?	?	3 (Note: Appearance(s) in K League Championship)	1	27	2
Cheonan Ilhwa Chunma	1996	K League	25	5	?	?	0	0	?	?	—		25	5
Cheonan Ilhwa Chunma	1997	K League	7	1	?	?	5	0	?	?	—		12	1
Cheonan Ilhwa Chunma	1998	K League	12	3	?	?	1	0	—		—		13	3
Cheonan Ilhwa Chunma	Total		201	51	?	?	22	4	?	?	3	1	226	56
Lorient	1999	French Division 1	4	0	0	0	0	0	—		—		4	0
Seongnam Ilhwa Chunma	1999	K League	15	3	?	?	1	0	—		—		16	3
Seongnam Ilhwa Chunma	2000	K League	23	9	?	?	11	4	? (Note: Appearance(s) in Asian Cup Winners' Cup)	?	2	0	36	13
Seongnam Ilhwa Chunma	Total		38	12	?	?	12	4	?	?	2	0	52	16
Bucheon SK	2001	K League	16	1	?	?	4	0	—		—		20	1
Career total			259	64	?	?	38	8	?	?	5	1	302	73

=== International ===
Results list South Korea's goal tally first.

List of international goals scored by Lee Sang-yoon
No.	Date	Venue	Opponent	Score	Result	Competition
1	4 February 1990	Ta' Qali, Malta	Norway	2–1	2–3	Friendly
2	31 July 1990	Beijing, China	China	1–0	1–0	1990 Dynasty Cup
3	12 September 1997	Seoul, South Korea	Uzbekistan	2–1	2–1	1998 FIFA World Cup qualification
4	4 October 1997	Seoul, South Korea	United Arab Emirates	3–0	3–0	1998 FIFA World Cup qualification
5	9 November 1997	Abu Dhabi, United Arab Emirates	United Arab Emirates	1–0	3–1	1998 FIFA World Cup qualification
6	27 January 1998	Bangkok, Thailand	Egypt	2–0	2–0	1998 King's Cup
7	1 March 1998	Yokohama, Japan	Japan	1–1	1–2	1998 Dynasty Cup
8	4 March 1998	Yokohama, Japan	China	2–1	2–1	1998 Dynasty Cup
9	1 April 1998	Seoul, South Korea	Japan	1–0	2–1	Friendly
10	16 May 1998	Seoul, South Korea	Jamaica	1–0	2–1	Friendly
11	16 May 1998	Seoul, South Korea	Jamaica	2–1	2–1	Friendly
12	4 June 1998	Seoul, South Korea	China	1–0	1–1	Friendly

== Honours ==
Cheonan Ilhwa Chunma

- K League 1: 1993, 1994, 1995
- Korean FA Cup: 1999
- Korean League Cup: 1992
- Asian Club Championship: 1995–96
- Asian Super Cup: 1996
- Afro-Asian Club Championship: 1996

Individual

- K League All-Star: 1991, 1992, 1997, 1998
- K League 1 Best XI: 1991, 1993
- K League 1 Most Valuable Player: 1993
