= Liu Yue (footballer, born 1975) =

Chinese footballer

Personal information
- Date of birth: 12 July 1975 (age 51)
- Place of birth: Jinan, Shandong, China
- Height: 1.75 m (5 ft 9 in)
- Position: Defender

Senior career*
Years	Team	Apps	(Gls)
1994–1999	Shandong Luneng	101	(3)
2000–2003	Yunnan Hongta	87	(6)
2004	Chongqing Lifan	5	(0)

International career
1995–1996	China	11	(0)
Medal record
Men's football
Representing China
East Asian Games
Bronze medal – third place	1993 Shanghai	Football
- * Club domestic league appearances and goals

Liu Yue (Chinese: 刘越; born 12 July 1975) is a Chinese former international football defender who played for Shandong Luneng, Yunnan Hongta and Chongqing Lifan while also representing China in the 1996 Asian Cup. Since retiring he has moved into sports commentary with Shanghai TV.

== Playing career ==
Liu Yue would start his career with Shandong Luneng and would quickly make a name for himself when he was part of the team that won the 1995 Chinese FA Cup. This would soon see him selected for the Chinese national team where he was selected as the team's first choice left back within the 1996 Asian Cup. Within the tournament he would have a disappointing game against Saudi Arabia within the quarter-finals, which saw China knocked out of the competition and ending his international career once the manager Qi Wusheng permanently drop him from the team. Despite this Liu would continue to be a regular for Shandong and go on to win the 1999 league title and FA Cup with them before moving to Yunnan Hongta F.C. where he was reunited with his former coach Qi Wusheng. After spending several seasons with Yunnan the club were taken over by Chongqing Lifan where he spent one season with them before retiring.

== Honours ==
Shandong Luneng

- Chinese Jia-A League: 1999
- Chinese FA Cup: 1995, 1999
