= Dynasty Cup =

East Asian international football tournament

- Founded: 1990
- Abolished: 1998
- Region: East Asia
- Teams: 4
- Last champions: Japan (3rd title)
- Most championships: Japan (3 titles)

Dynasty Cup was an East Asian international association football tournament. It was hosted by China in 1990 and 1992, Hong Kong in 1995, and Japan in 1998.

The inaugural edition in 1990 was won by South Korea. The next three editions were won by Japan, before the tournament was discontinued in 1998.

== Results ==
Year	Hosts	Champions	Runners-up	Third place	Fourth place
1990; Details	China	South Korea	China	North Korea	Japan
1992; Details	China	Japan	South Korea	North Korea	China
1995; Details	Hong Kong	Japan	South Korea	Hong Kong	China
1998; Details	Japan	Japan	China	South Korea	Hong Kong

== Performance by nation ==
Rank	Team	Title(s)	Runners-up	Third place	Fourth place	Total
1	Japan	3	0	0	1	4
2	South Korea	1	2	1	0	4
3	China	0	2	0	2	4
4	North Korea	0	0	2	0	2
5	Hong Kong	0	0	1	1	2

== Summary ==
Rank	Team	Part	M	W	D	L	GF	GA	GD	Points
1	South Korea	4	15	7	7	1	20	12	+8	28
2	Japan	4	14	6	4	4	23	15	+8	22
3	China	4	14	4	5	5	12	13	–1	17
4	North Korea	2	6	1	2	3	5	10	–5	5
5	Hong Kong	2	7	0	2	5	4	14	–10	2

== Most valuable players ==
Year	Player
1990	(South Korea) Kim Joo-sung
1992	(Japan) Kazuyoshi Miura
1995	(Japan) Masami Ihara
1998	(Japan) Hidetoshi Nakata

== Top scorers ==
Year	Player	Goals
1990	(China) Wu Qunli	2
1992	(Japan) Takuya Takagi	4
1995	(Japan) Hisashi Kurosaki	4
1998	(China) Li Bing	3

== See also ==
- EAFF E-1 Football Championship
