= Ko Jeong-woon =

South Korean footballer

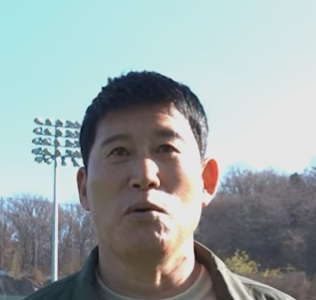
- Ko in November 2022

Personal information
- Full name: Ko Jeong-woon
- Date of birth: 27 June 1966 (age 60)
- Place of birth: Wanju, Jeonbuk, South Korea
- Height: 1.77 m (5 ft 10 in)
- Position: Winger

Team information
- Current team: Gimpo FC (manager)

College career
Years	Team	Apps	(Gls)
1985–1988	Konkuk University		

Senior career*
Years	Team	Apps	(Gls)
1989–1996	Cheonan Ilhwa Chunma	173	(34)
1997–1998	Cerezo Osaka	29	(3)
1998–2001	Pohang Steelers	35	(14)
Total		237	(51)

International career^{‡}
1987–1988	South Korea B		
1989–1997	South Korea	77	(10)

Managerial career
- 2003: Sun Moon University
- 2018: FC Anyang
- 2020–: Gimpo FC
Medal record
Representing South Korea
Men's football
Asian Games
Bronze medal – third place	1990 Beijing
- * Club domestic league appearances and goals as of 30 June 2007 ‡ National team caps and goals as of 26 June 2014

- Ko Jeong-woon
- Hangul: 고정운
- Hanja: 高正云
- RR: Go Jeongun
- MR: Ko Chŏngun

Ko Jeong-woon (born 27 June 1966) is a South Korean football manager and former player. He is currently manager of K League 2 club Gimpo FC.

== Playing career ==
Ko was one of South Korea's most influential forwards at the 1994 FIFA World Cup. While playing three group stage matches as a left winger for his country, he sent off Miguel Ángel Nadal in a 2–2 draw with Spain.

That year, Ko also received the K League Most Valuable Player Award after lifting the league trophy. According to him, Bundesliga club Bayer Leverkusen was interested in him, approaching his club Ilhwa Chunma at the end of the season. He individually negotiated with Leverkusen after going to Germany, but Ilhwa director Park Gyu-nam strongly opposed his transfer. He said the cancellation of the contract became his lifelong resentment.

== Managerial career ==
=== Early career ===
In 2003, Ko managed the football club of Sun Moon University, starting his managerial career. Sun Moon University was owned by Tongil Group, the owner of Ilhwa Chunma for which he had played. Between 2004 and 2006, he followed his mentor at Ilhwa, Lee Jang-soo, working as a coach of K League clubs Jeonnam Dragons and FC Seoul under Lee.

In 2008, Ko returned to Ilhwa as a coach of their under-18 team, also known as the football club of Pungsaeng High School. He was promoted to manager of Pungsaeng in 2010, managing them until 2011.

=== FC Anyang ===
After working as a professor of Howon University and football commentator of SPOTV, Ko was appointed manager of K League 2 club FC Anyang prior to the 2018 season. After a 11-match winless streak, he gained his first win as a professional manager in a match against Gwangju FC on 20 May, which ended in a 3–2 win. His results improved during the second half of the season, but Anyang failed to advance to the promotion play-offs. He resigned from the team at the end of the season.

=== Gimpo FC ===
In 2020, Ko became the manager of K3 League side Gimpo Citizen (renamed Gimpo FC in 2021). In 2021, his team finished second in the regular season, and then achieved the league title by winning the play-offs. In 2022, Gimpo got a license for professionalisation, being promoted to the K League 2 regardless of the results at the K3 League. In 2023, the Gimpo squad qualified for the promotion play-offs as the regular season's third-placed team despite receiving the second lowest salary among K League 2 teams. During the play-offs, they defeated Gyeongnam FC 2–1 in the semi-final, and lost 2–1 on aggregate to K League 1 side Gangwon FC in the two-legged final. His team failed to be promoted, but he was named the league's Manager of the Year.

In 2026, however, it was revealed that Gimpo FC's executives embezzled ₩8.3 billion from the club for about three years since 2023. Among them, director Kwon Il was Ko's agent in the past, and joined the club as a temporary worker by Ko's recommendation. Afterwards, Kwon was promoted to director, and renewed Ko's contract with he increasing Ko's salary sharply (to ₩300 million). For a year, Gimpo FC earned ₩400 million from ticket sales, whereas they used about ₩10 billion as an operating budget. The press paid attention to the waste of tax money as well as the embezzlement.

== Career statistics ==
=== Club ===
Appearances and goals by club, season and competition
Club	Season	League			National cup		League cup		Continental		Other		Total	
Club	Season	Division	Apps	Goals	Apps	Goals	Apps	Goals	Apps	Goals	Apps	Goals	Apps	Goals
Cheonan Ilhwa Chunma	1989	K League	31	4	?	?	—		—		—		31	4
Cheonan Ilhwa Chunma	1990	K League	21	4	—		—		—		—		21	4
Cheonan Ilhwa Chunma	1991	K League	40	13	—		—		—		—		40	13
Cheonan Ilhwa Chunma	1992	K League	26	4	—		7	3	—		—		33	7
Cheonan Ilhwa Chunma	1993	K League	2	0	—		0	0	—		—		2	0
Cheonan Ilhwa Chunma	1994	K League	21	4	—		0	0	?	?	—		21	4
Cheonan Ilhwa Chunma	1995	K League	25	4	—		4	1	?	?	—		29	5
Cheonan Ilhwa Chunma	1996	K League	7	1	?	?	5	3	?	?	4 (Note: Two appearances and two goals in Afro-Asian Club Championship, two appearances in Asian Super Cup)	2	16	6
Cheonan Ilhwa Chunma	Total		173	34	?	?	16	7	?	?	4	2	193	43
Cerezo Osaka	1997	J1 League	17	3	?	?	5	3	—		—		22	6
Cerezo Osaka	1998	J1 League	12	0	?	?	2	0	—		—		14	0
Cerezo Osaka	Total		29	3	?	?	7	3	—		—		36	6
Pohang Steelers	1998	K League	16	5	?	?	—		?	?	?	0	16	5
Pohang Steelers	1999	K League	19	9	?	?	2	0	?	?	—		21	9
Pohang Steelers	2000	K League	0	0	?	?	0	0	—		—		0	0
Pohang Steelers	2001	K League	0	0	?	?	4	0	—		—		4	0
Pohang Steelers	Total		35	14	?	?	6	0	?	?	?	0	41	14
Career total			237	51	?	?	29	10	?	?	4	2	270	63

=== International ===
Appearances and goals by national team and year
National team	Year	Apps	Goals
South Korea	1989	2	0
South Korea	1990	9	2
South Korea	1991	6	1
South Korea	1992	4	0
South Korea	1993	9	2
South Korea	1994	18	2
South Korea	1995	7	0
South Korea	1996	11	2
South Korea	1997	11	1
Career total		77	10

Scores and results list South Korea's goal tally first.

List of international goals scored by Ko Jeong-woon
No.	Date	Venue	Opponent	Score	Result	Competition
1	23 September 1990	Beijing, China	Singapore	4–0	7–0	1990 Asian Games
2	23 September 1990	Beijing, China	Singapore	6–0	7–0	1990 Asian Games
3	9 June 1991	Seoul, South Korea	Indonesia	1–0	3–0	1991 Korea Cup
4	16 October 1993	Doha, Qatar	Iran	3–0	3–0	1994 FIFA World Cup qualification
5	28 October 1993	Doha, Qatar	North Korea	1–0	3–0	1994 FIFA World Cup qualification
6	11 June 1994	Duncanville, United States	Honduras	1–0	3–0	Friendly
7	1 October 1994	Hiroshima, Japan	Nepal	5–0	11–0	1994 Asian Games
8	23 March 1996	Dubai, United Arab Emirates	Morocco	1–0	2–2	1996 Dubai Tournament
9	7 December 1996	Abu Dhabi, United Arab Emirates	Indonesia	4–1	4–2	1996 AFC Asian Cup
10	18 October 1997	Tashkent, Uzbekistan	Uzbekistan	4–0	5–1	1998 FIFA World Cup qualification

== Managerial statistics ==
As of 8 October 2022

Managerial record by team and tenure
Team	From	To	Record				
Team	From	To	P	W	D	L	Win %
Gimpo FC	1 January 2020	Present	92	31	29	32	33.70
Total			92	31	29	32	33.70

== Honours ==
=== Player ===
Cheonan Ilhwa Chunma

- K League 1: 1993, 1994, 1995
- Korean League Cup: 1992
- Asian Club Championship: 1995
- Asian Super Cup: 1996
- Afro-Asian Club Championship: 1996

Pohang Steelers

- Korean FA Cup runner-up: 2001

South Korea

- Asian Games bronze medal: 1990

Individual

- K League Rookie of the Year: 1989
- K League 1 Best XI: 1991, 1994, 1995, 1999
- K League All-Star: 1991, 1992, 1995, 1999, 2001
- K League 1 Most Valuable Player: 1994
- K League 1 top assist provider: 1994
- K League '90s All-Star Team: 2003

=== Manager ===
Gimpo FC

- K3 League: 2021

Individual

- K League Manager of the Month: April 2023, August 2025
- K League 2 Manager of the Year: 2023
