= South Korea national football team results (unofficial matches) =

- Win Draw Loss

This article shows unofficial matches of the South Korea national football team. They don't meet the standard of international "A" matches.

== International matches ==
The following matches are classified as unofficial matches against national teams or league selections.

=== 1940s ===
| Date | Competition | Team scorer(s) | Score | Opponent scorer(s) | Opponent | Venue | Ref. | Note(s) |
|---|---|---|---|---|---|---|---|---|
| 1949-01-01 | Friendly | Chung Kook-chin 5', 9'; Chung Nam-sik 20'; Min Byung-dae 23'; Bae Jeong-ho 27' | 5–2 | Weatherall 68'; Cheung Kam-hoi 75' (pen.) | Hong Kong XI | Hong Kong | | |
| 1949-01-09 | Friendly | Chung Kook-chin 26'; Chung Nam-sik 53' (pen.), 65'; Min Byung-dae 88' | 4–2 | Li Chun-fai 17'; Cheung Kam-hoi 35' (pen.) | Hong Kong XI | Hong Kong | | |
| 1949-01-15 | Friendly | | 4–2 | | Vietnam B | Saigon, Vietnam | | |

=== 1950s ===
| Date | Competition | Team scorer(s) | Score | Opponent scorer(s) | Opponent | Venue | Ref. | Note(s) |
|---|---|---|---|---|---|---|---|---|
| 1953-04-16 | Friendly | Min Byung-dae 9'; Choi Chung-min 22', 46' | 3–2 | Siang Teik 44'; Sai Chong 55' | (Federation of Malaya) Malaya XI | Singapore | | |
| 1953-04-27 | Friendly | Chu Young-kwang 20'; Choi Yung-keun 39'; Chung Nam-sik 48' | 3–5 | Kam Lok-sang 6'; Chu Wing-wah 46', 62'; Szeto Man 54', 79' | Hong Kong XI | Hong Kong | | |
| 1956-02-26 | Friendly | Woo Sang-kwon 15'; Kim Hong-woo 27' | 2–1 | Larry Chua 3' | (Taiwan) Republic of China XI | Manila, Philippines | | |
| 1956-02-28 | Friendly | Choi Chung-min 13', 30', 61'; Park Il-kap 49'; Kim Young-jin 79', 80' | 6–1 | Larry Chua 17' (pen.) | Philippines University XI | Manila, Philippines | | |

=== 1960s ===
| Date | Competition | Team scorer(s) | Score | Opponent scorer(s) | Opponent | Venue | Ref. | Note(s) |
|---|---|---|---|---|---|---|---|---|
| 1960-08-30 | Friendly | Jeong Sun-cheon 28', 68', 90'; Cha Tae-sung 75'; Woo Sang-kwon 81' | 5–2 | ? 4', 35' | Hong Kong XI | Hong Kong | | |
| 1960-09-01 | Friendly | Yoo Pan-soon 46' | 1–2 | ? 59', 81' | Hong Kong XI | Hong Kong | | |
| 1961-11-04 | Friendly | Jeong Sun-cheon 10', 44', 55'; Kim Seon-hwi 75' | 4–1 | | Thailand XI | Bangkok, Thailand | | |
| 1961-11-06 | Friendly | — | 0–1 | Lua Wen-chung 85' | Hong Kong XI | Hong Kong | | |
| 1962-05-26 | Friendly | Jeong Sun-cheon 43'; Yoo Pan-soon 55' | 2–1 | Sian Liong 65' (pen.) | Indonesia XI | Jakarta, Indonesia | | |
| 1962-05-29 | Friendly | Cho Yoon-ok 1'; Woo Sang-kwon 25' | 2–1 | Mubarak 30' | Indonesia XI | Jakarta, Indonesia | | |
| 1962-06-04 | Friendly | Yoo Pan-soon 11'; Cho Yoon-ok 35', 58' | 3–1 | Robert 6' | (Federation of Malaya) Malaya XI | Kuala Lumpur, Malaya | | |
| 1962-06-06 | Friendly | Cho Sung-dal 23'; Cho Yoon-ok 55'; Jeong Sun-cheon 57'; Moon Jung-sik 67' | 4–3 | Govindaraju 5', 8'; Arthur 48' | (Federation of Malaya) Malaya XI | Penang, Malaya | | |
| 1962-06-08 | Friendly | — | 0–1 | Ghani 68' | (Federation of Malaya) Malaya XI | Alor Setar, Malaya | | |
| 1962-06-13 | Friendly | Cho Sung-dal 7'; Cho Yoon-ok 13', 19'; Woo Sang-kwon 31', 47'; Cha Tae-sung 43' | 6–2 | Lau Chi-lam 15', 35' | Hong Kong XI | Hong Kong | | |
| 1963-08-09 | 1963 Pestabola Merdeka | Cho Yoon-ok 77' | 1–0 | — | (United Kingdom) Great Britain Military | Kuala Lumpur, Malaya | | |
| 1963-08-25 | Friendly | Cho Yoon-ok 81' | 1–1 | Hla Shwe 43' | (Myanmar) Burma U20 | Yangon, Burma | | |
| 1964-07-04 | Friendly | Cho Sung-dal 5'; Cha Tae-sung 33'; Woo Sang-kwon 35'; Cho Yoon-ok 40', 68' | 5–4 | | Hong Kong XI | Hong Kong | | |
| 1964-07-05 | Friendly | Cho Yoon-ok 17', 27'; Cha Kyung-bok 64' | 3–0 | — | Hong Kong XI | Hong Kong | | |
| 1964-10-14 | 1964 Summer Olympics | — | 0–4 | Zé Roberto 30'; Elizeu 44', 54'; Roberto 73' | Brazil Olympic | Mitsuzawa Soccer Stadium; Yokohama, Japan | | |
| 1966-08-14 | 1966 Pestabola Merdeka | Cha Tae-sung 50'; Kim Jung-nam 76' | 2–0 | — | Japan B | Kuala Lumpur, Malaysia | | |
| 1966-09-04 | 1966 Pestabola Merdeka | Huh Yoon-jung 10'; Cho Sung-dal 17' | 2–1 | Cheung Yiu-kwok 67' | Hong Kong XI | Hong Kong | | |
| 1968-08-18 | 1968 Pestabola Merdeka | Jeong Kang-ji 4'; Huh Yoon-jung 54' | 2–0 | — | Japan B | Ipoh, Malaysia | | |
| 1968-08-18 | Friendly | Lee Hoe-taik 54', 65', 79'; Huh Yoon-jung 57', 67', 70'; Kim Ki-bok 89' | 7–1 | Kwong Yin-ying 69' | Hong Kong XI | Singapore | | |

=== 1970s ===
| Date | Competition | Team scorer(s) | Score | Opponent scorer(s) | Opponent | Venue | Ref. | Note(s) |
|---|---|---|---|---|---|---|---|---|
| 1972-07-13 | 1972 Pestabola Merdeka | Park Su-deok 34'; Lee Hoe-taik 48'; Park Lee-chun 70' | 3–1 | Mohammed 43' | Malaysia B | Kuala Lumpur, Malaysia | | |
| 1975-05-14 | 1975 Korea Cup | Lee Cha-man 5' | 1–0 | — | Japan B | Seoul, South Korea | | |
| 1975-05-18 | 1975 Korea Cup | Cho Kwang-rae 6'; Shin Hyun-ho 10'; Park Byung-chul 17' | 3–0 | — | Indonesia B | Seoul, South Korea | | |
| 1975-06-13 | 1975 Jakarta Anniversary Tournament | Lee Young-moo 33' | 1–1 | Tarquinio 73' | Australia B | Jakarta, Indonesia | | |
| 1976-01-02 | 1975 King's Cup | Lee Young-moo 12', 50'; Jang Ki-moon 57', 59' | 4–0 | — | Malaysia B | Bangkok, Thailand | | |
| 1976-12-25 | 1976 King's Cup | Kim Kang-nam 19', 43'; Kim Sung-nam 58' | 3–1 | Bandid 64' | Thailand B | Bangkok, Thailand | | |
| 1978-05-25 | 1978 Japan Cup | Cha Bum-kun 6'; Lee Young-moo 17'; Shin Hyun-ho 59' | 3–0 | — | Japan XI | Okayama, Japan | | |
| 1978-09-16 | 1978 Korea Cup | Cha Bum-kun 46', 68'; Kim Kang-nam 57', 59' | 4–1 | Garcia 19' | United States Olympic | Seoul, South Korea | | |

=== 1980s ===
| Date | Competition | Team scorer(s) | Score | Opponent scorer(s) | Opponent | Venue | Ref. | Note(s) |
|---|---|---|---|---|---|---|---|---|
| 1980-08-23 | 1980 Korea Cup | Hwang Seok-keun 68', 78' | 2–0 | — | Malaysia B | Seoul, South Korea | | |
| 1980-08-27 | 1980 Korea Cup | Choi Soon-ho 24'; Lee Tae-yeop 38'; Lee Tae-ho 50' (pen.); Chung Hae-won 55' | 4–0 | — | Thailand B | Daejeon, South Korea | | |
| 1980-08-29 | 1980 Korea Cup | Chung Hae-won 33', 85'; Lee Kang-jo 34'; Cho Kwang-rae 44'; Lee Tae-ho 69' | 5–0 | — | Bahrain B | Gwangju, South Korea | | |
| 1981-02-08 | Friendly | Lee Kang-jo 89' | 1–1 | Herrera 22' | Mexico B | Mexico City, Mexico | | |
| 1981-08-13 | 1981 Jakarta Anniversary Tournament | Lee Kang-jo 82' | 1–1 | ? 71' | Bulgaria XI | Jakarta, Indonesia | | |
| 1981-08-15 | 1981 Jakarta Anniversary Tournament | Hwang Seok-keun 7' (?); Byun Byung-joo 48'; Lee Kang-jo (?); Cho Kwang-rae (?); Lee Tae-ho (?) ? (?) | 8–0 | — | Indonesia B | Jakarta, Indonesia | | |
| 1981-08-17 | 1981 Jakarta Anniversary Tournament | Hwang Seok-keun 37', 72' | 2–0 | — | Thailand B | Jakarta, Indonesia | | |
| 1981-08-20 | 1981 Jakarta Anniversary Tournament | Hwang Seok-keun (?) | 1–0 | — | Indonesia | Jakarta, Indonesia | | |
| 1981-08-21 | 1981 Jakarta Anniversary Tournament | Byun Byung-joo (?); Choi Kyoung-sik (?) | 2–2 | — | Bulgaria XI | Jakarta, Indonesia | | |
| 1982-02-23 | 1982 Nehru Cup | Chung Hae-won 7' | 1–1 | Celar 54' | (Socialist Federal Republic of Yugoslavia) Yugoslavia B | Calcutta, India | | |
| 1982-02-26 | 1982 Nehru Cup | Choi Soon-ho 20', 40', 89'; Lee Tae-ho 85' | 4–2 | Marozzi 47'; Guadalupi 60' | Italy Amateurs | Calcutta, India | | |
| 1982-05-02 | 1982 King's Cup | Byun Byung-joo 20'; Cho Kwang-rae 47'; Hwang Seok-keun 60'; Lee Tae-ho 65'; Choi Soon-ho 85' | 5–0 | — | Thailand B | Bangkok, Thailand | | |
| 1982-05-05 | 1982 King's Cup | Chung Hae-won 11'; Byun Byung-joo 26'; Choi Soon-ho 44'; Lee Kang-jo 59'; Lee Tae-ho 70' | 5–0 | | Malaysia XI | Bangkok, Thailand | | |
| 1982-05-13 | 1982 King's Cup | Chung Hae-won 21' | 1–0 | — | Thailand B | Bangkok, Thailand | | |
| 1982-05-15 | 1982 King's Cup | Choi Soon-ho 12'; Lee Kang-jo 38', 88' | 3–1 | Alongkote 72' | Thailand B | Bangkok, Thailand | | |
| 1982-06-07 | 1982 Korea Cup | Park Sung-hwa 41'; Choi Soon-ho 44', 88' | 3–0 | — | Indonesia Garuda | Seoul, South Korea | | |
| 1986-02-09 | 1986 Lunar New Year Cup | Kim Yong-se 20'; Choi Soon-ho 83' | 2–0 | — | Hong Kong XI | Hong Kong | | |
| 1987-06-08 | 1987 Korea Cup | Kim Sam-soo 37' | 1–0 | — | Hungary XI | Seoul, South Korea | | |
| 1987-12-19 | 1987 Pestabola Merdeka | Noh Soo-jin 30' (pen.); Kim Joo-sung 65' | 2–3 | Bielik 23'; Daněk 25'; Ekhardt 62' | Czechoslovakia Olympic | Kuala Lumpur, Malaysia | | |
| 1988-06-16 | 1988 Korea Cup | Yeo Bum-kyu 15'; Choi Soon-ho 37', 40'; Choi Sang-kook 56'; Lee Tae-ho 67' | 5–1 | Bizzarri 55' | (Italy) Serie C U21 | Seoul, South Korea | | |
| 1988-06-26 | 1988 Korea Cup | — | 0–0 (a.e.t.) (3–4 p) | — | Czechoslovakia XI | Seoul, South Korea | | |
| 1988-09-18 | 1988 Summer Olympics | — | 0–0 | — | Soviet Union Olympic | Busan, South Korea | | |
| 1988-09-22 | 1988 Summer Olympics | Noh Soo-jin 14' | 1–2 | Alfaro Moreno 3'; Fabbri 73' | Argentina Olympic | Busan, South Korea | | |
| 1989-06-17 | 1989 Korea Cup | Hwang Sun-hong 16' | 1–1 | Henderson 51' | United States U21 | Seoul, South Korea | | |
| 1989-06-21 | 1989 Korea Cup | Hwang Sun-hong 51'; Hwangbo Kwan 76'; Park Yang-ha 78' | 3–0 | — | Hungary U21 | Gwangju, South Korea | | |

=== 1990s ===
| Date | Competition | Team scorer(s) | Score | Opponent scorer(s) | Opponent | Venue | Ref. | Note(s) |
|---|---|---|---|---|---|---|---|---|
| 1993-06-23 | 1993 Korea Cup | Kim Jung-hyuk 16'; Choi Moon-sik 57' (pen.); Seo Jung-won 84' | 3–0 | — | China U20 | Changwon, South Korea | | |
| 1993-06-26 | 1993 Korea Cup | Jung Jae-kwon 75' | 1–0 | — | (Czech Republic) Czechoslovakia XI | Busan, South Korea | | |
| 1995-02-23 | 1995 Dynasty Cup | Lee Ki-hyung 15'; Ko Jeong-woon 39'; Choi Yong-soo 88' | 3–2 | Greer 20'; Bredbury 64' | Hong Kong XI | Hong Kong | | |
| 1998-01-25 | 1998 King's Cup | Sin Byung-ho 85' | 1–2 | Andersen 13'; Bisgaard 73' | Denmark B | Thai National Stadium; Bangkok, Thailand | | |
| 1998-03-07 | 1998 Dynasty Cup | Choi Yong-soo 90' | 1–0 | — | Hong Kong XI | Yoyogi Park; Tokyo, Japan | | |

=== 2000s ===
| Date | Competition | Team scorer(s) | Score | Opponent scorer(s) | Opponent | Venue | Ref. | Note(s) |
|---|---|---|---|---|---|---|---|---|
| 2001-02-08 | 2001 Dubai Tournament | Yoo Sang-chul 87' | 1–1 | Rokki 10' | Morocco B | Dubai, United Arab Emirates | | |
| 2001-02-14 | 2001 Dubai Tournament | — | 0–2 | Mikkelsen 7'; Nielsen 78' | Denmark XI | Dubai, United Arab Emirates | | |
| 2005-08-14 | Friendly | Chung Kyung-ho 34'; Kim Jin-yong 36'; Park Chu-young 68' | 3–0 | — | North Korea | Seoul World Cup Stadium; Seoul, South Korea | | |
| 2009-06-02 | Friendly | — | 0–0 | — | Oman | Zabeel Stadium; Dubai, United Arab Emirates | | (Note: This friendly match did not accord the status of international "A" match organized by FIFA, because South Korea used seven substitutes in the match. Under the FIFA regulations, a maximum of six substitutes could be used in an official international match.) |

=== 2010s ===
| Date | Competition | Team scorer(s) | Score | Opponent scorer(s) | Opponent | Venue | Ref. | Note(s) |
|---|---|---|---|---|---|---|---|---|
| 2011-10-07 | Friendly | Park Chu-young 65', 76' | 2–2 | Lewandowski 29'; Błaszczykowski 82' | Poland | Seoul World Cup Stadium; Seoul, South Korea | | |
| 2015-01-04 | Friendly | Hawsawi 67' (o.g.); Lee Jeong-hyeop 90+2' | 2–0 | — | Saudi Arabia | Parramatta Stadium; Sydney, Australia | | (Note: This friendly match did not accord the status of international "A" match organized by FIFA, because FIFA received the pre-exhibition match document from the Australian FA late.) |

== Non-international matches ==
The following matches are classified as unofficial matches against allied teams, regional teams, or clubs.

=== 1940s ===
| Date | Competition | Team scorer(s) | Score | Opponent scorer(s) | Opponent | Venue | Ref. | Note(s) |
|---|---|---|---|---|---|---|---|---|
| 1948-07-06 | Friendly | Chung Nam-sik 5', 44', 47', 55'; Chung Kook-chin 7' | 5–1 | Tam Woon-cheung 27' | Hong Kong–Chinese | Hong Kong | | |
| 1949-01-02 | Friendly | Jang Kyung-hwan 54'; Chung Kook-chin 62' | 2–3 | Lai Shiu-wing 30', 89'; Cheung Kam-hoi 32' | Hong Kong–Chinese | Hong Kong | | |
| 1949-01-04 | Friendly | Jang Kyung-hwan 12'; Kim Ji-sung 77' | 2–3 | Kiernan 7'; Mullen 22', 69' | Hong Kong–Foreigners | Hong Kong | | |
| 1949-01-18 | Friendly | | 5–0 | | (France) French Military in Vietnam | Saigon, Vietnam | | |

=== 1950s ===
| Date | Competition | Team scorer(s) | Score | Opponent scorer(s) | Opponent | Venue | Ref. | Note(s) |
|---|---|---|---|---|---|---|---|---|
| 1950-04-16 | Friendly | Kim Yong-sik 15', 75'; Choi Yung-keun 85' | 3–1 | Tang Yee-kit 38' | Hong Kong–Chinese | Hong Kong | | |
| 1953-04-12 | Friendly | — | 0–2 | Harith 42' (pen.); Boon Seong 53' | (Federation of Malaya) (Taiwan) Malaya–Republic of China | Singapore | | |
| 1953-04-14 | Friendly | Chung Nam-sik 76' | 1–2 | Davenport 2'; Min Byung-dae 89' (o.g.) | (United Kingdom) British Military in Singapore | Singapore | | |
| 1953-04-22 | Friendly | Choi Yung-keun 5'; Park Il-kap 11'; Choi Chung-min 61', 63' | 4–0 | — | Singapore–Chinese | Singapore | | |
| 1953-05-07 | Friendly | Chung Nam-sik 32'; Choi Yung-keun 54' | 2–0 | — | (United Kingdom) British Military in Hong Kong | Hong Kong | | |
| 1953-05-16 | Friendly | | Unknown | | Hong Kong–Chinese | Hong Kong | | |
| 1958-02-22 | Friendly | Woo Sang-kwon 59' | 1–3 | Tang Sum 17'; Ho Cheng-yau 53'; Yiu Cheuk-yin 64' | Chinese in Hong Kong | Hong Kong | | |
| 1958-03-04 | Friendly | — | 0–0 | — | Chinese in Hong Kong | Hong Kong | | |

=== 1960s ===
| Date | Competition | Team scorer(s) | Score | Opponent scorer(s) | Opponent | Venue | Ref. | Note(s) |
|---|---|---|---|---|---|---|---|---|
| 1960-08-17 | Friendly | Jeong Sun-cheon 9'; Cha Tae-sung 20'; Park Gyeong-hwa 63'; Yoo Pan-soon 70' | 4–0 | — | (Federation of Malaya) Penang | Penang, Malaya | | |
| 1960-08-19 | Friendly | Yoo Pan-soon 19' | 1–2 | Rahman 5', 61' | (Federation of Malaya) Perak | Perak, Malaya | | |
| 1960-08-21 | Friendly | Cha Tae-sung 25'; Choi Chung-min 52' | 2–1 | ? 21' | (Federation of Malaya) Selangor | Kuala Lumpur, Malaya | | |
| 1961-04-01 | Friendly | Jeong Sun-cheon 67' (pen.); Lee Soon-myung 75' | 2–4 | Freitas 1'; Veríssimo 44', 57'; Darcy Santos 48' | (Brazil) Madureira | Hyochang Stadium; Seoul, South Korea | | |
| 1961-04-02 | Friendly | — | 0–2 | Veríssimo 21', 28' | (Brazil) Madureira | Hyochang Stadium; Seoul, South Korea | | |
| 1962-03-10 | Friendly | — | 0–1 | Gallardo 25' | (Peru) Sporting Cristal | Hyochang Stadium; Seoul, South Korea | | |
| 1962-03-11 | Friendly | Jeong Sun-cheon 14' | 1–3 | Gallardo 20'; Quintos 61' ? 79' | (Peru) Sporting Cristal | Hyochang Stadium; Seoul, South Korea | | |
| 1962-06-16 | Friendly | Cha Tae-sung 21' | 1–2 | Cheung Chi-wai 33'; Kwok Yau 69' | Chinese in Hong Kong | Hong Kong | | |
| 1963-08-20 | Friendly | Jeong Sun-cheon 22'; Huh Yoon-jung 27'; Cha Tae-sung 65', 70' | 4–1 | ? 48' | (Federation of Malaya) Penang | Penang, Malaya | | |
| 1963-09-01 | Friendly | Lee Hyun 4'; Jo Nam-soo 16' | 2–2 | ? 35' ? 60' | Chinese in Hong Kong | Hong Kong | | |
| 1963-09-03 | Friendly | Cho Yoon-ok 53'; Jung Byung-tak 62' | 2–1 | ? 76' | Chinese in Hong Kong | Hong Kong | | |
| 1968-08-10 | 1968 Pestabola Merdeka | — | 0–3 | Van Oosten 27'; Mcintosh 75'; Segon 90' | Western Australia XI | Kuala Lumpur, Malaysia | | |

=== 1970s ===
| Date | Competition | Team scorer(s) | Score | Opponent scorer(s) | Opponent | Venue | Ref. | Note(s) |
|---|---|---|---|---|---|---|---|---|
| 1974-06-15 | Friendly | Kim Jae-han 21'; Park Lee-chun 22' | 2–1 | Brooks 75' | (England) Middlesex Wanderers | Seoul, South Korea | | |
| 1974-06-17 | Friendly | Cha Bum-kun 71' | 1–1 | Brooks 31' | (England) Middlesex Wanderers | Seoul, South Korea | | |
| 1974-12-22 | Hong Kong Tournament | Kim Jin-kook 10'; Ko Jae-wook 75'; Cha Bum-kun 80' | 3–0 | — | (Hong Kong) South China | Hong Kong | | |
| 1975-04-24 | Friendly | Kim Jin-kook 77' | 1–0 | — | (West Germany) Tennis Borussia Berlin | Seoul, South Korea | | |
| 1975-04-27 | Friendly | Yoo Dong-choon 85' | 1–1 | Schulz 53' | (West Germany) Tennis Borussia Berlin | Seoul, South Korea | | |
| 1975-04-28 | Friendly | Park Byung-chul 19' | 1–1 | Subklewe 54' | (West Germany) Tennis Borussia Berlin | Busan, South Korea | | |
| 1975-05-10 | 1975 Korea Cup | — | 0–1 | Nazmi 37' | (Iran) Homa | Seoul, South Korea | | |
| 1975-05-20 | 1975 Korea Cup | Huh Jung-moo 18' | 1–0 | — | (Iran) Homa | Seoul, South Korea | | |
| 1976-02-15 | Friendly | Lee Young-moo 13', 29'; Cho Dong-hyun 70' | 3–0 | — | (Iran) Homa | Seoul, South Korea | | |
| 1976-06-01 | Friendly | — | 0–3 | Lester 27'; Clements 50', 85' | (England) Manchester City | Busan Gudeok Stadium; Busan, South Korea | | (Note: The series consisted of three games, and the first game was played by South Korea B.) |
| 1976-06-03 | Friendly | — | 0–3 | Lester 6'; Power 24'; Tueart 30' | (England) Manchester City | Daegu Civic Stadium; Daegu, South Korea | | |
| 1976-09-19 | 1976 Korea Cup | Cha Bum-kun 87' | 1–1 | Wilson Luis 22' | (Brazil) Paulista U21 | Seoul, South Korea | | |
| 1976-09-25 | 1976 Korea Cup | — | 0–0 (a.e.t.) | — | (Brazil) Paulista U21 | Seoul, South Korea | | |
| 1976-09-27 | Friendly | Park Jong-won 38' | 1–1 | W. Carrasco 12' | (Brazil) Paulista U21 | Busan, South Korea | | |
| 1977-09-07 | 1977 Korea Cup | Cho Kwang-rae 33'; Cha Bum-kun 43'; Kim Jae-han 84', 85' | 4–1 | ? 47' | (Lebanon) Racing Beirut | Busan, South Korea | | |
| 1977-09-11 | 1977 Korea Cup | Kim Jin-kook 41', 83'; Shin Hyun-ho 51', 77', 86'; Cha Bum-Kun 54' | 6–1 | Webb 60' | (England) Middlesex Wanderers | Seoul, South Korea | | |
| 1977-09-15 | 1977 Korea Cup | — | 0–1 | Baroninho 13' | (Brazil) Paulista U21 | Seoul, South Korea | | |
| 1977-09-18 | Friendly | Cha Bum-kun 66' (pen.) | 1–2 | Baroninho 18'; Nélson Borges 88' | (Brazil) Paulista U21 | Busan, South Korea | | |
| 1978-05-13 | Friendly | Lee Young-moo 29' | 1–1 | Viola 27' | (Italy) Bologna | Dongdaemun Stadium; Seoul, South Korea | | |
| 1978-05-15 | Friendly | Huh Jung-moo 89' | 1–0 | — | (Italy) Bologna | Busan Gudeok Stadium; Busan, South Korea | | |
| 1978-05-20 | 1978 Japan Cup | — | 0–1 | Frid 25' | (Brazil) Palmeiras | Osaka, Japan | | |
| 1978-05-23 | 1978 Japan Cup | Cha Bum-kun 21'; Kim Jae-han 63'; Kim Ho-kon 88' (pen.) | 3–4 | Simonsen 2'; Hannes 9'; Gores 52'; Del'Haye 70' | (West Germany) Borussia Mönchengladbach | Hiroshima, Japan | | |
| 1978-09-09 | 1978 Korea Cup | Kim Jae-han 32', 82'; Kim Kang-nam 68' | 3–2 | Irwin 25'; Graydon 48' (pen.) | (United States) Washington Diplomats | Seoul, South Korea | | |
| 1978-09-21 | 1978 Korea Cup | Cho Kwang-rae 1'; Huh Jung-moo 16'; Kim Kang-nam 29'; Kim Jae-han 48'; Park Sang-in 67'; Shin Hyun-ho 75' | 6–2 | Bakić 53'; Stokes 89' | (United States) Washington Diplomats | Seoul, South Korea | | |
| 1978-10-21 | Friendly | Park Sang-in 39' | 1–1 | Mosquera 29' | (Peru) Sporting Cristal | Busan, South Korea | | |
| 1978-10-23 | Friendly | — | 0–0 | — | (Peru) Sporting Cristal | Daegu, South Korea | | |
| 1978-10-26 | Friendly | Hwang Jae-man 15'; Park Sang-in 53'; Shin Hyun-ho 65' | 3–1 | Quesada 29' | (Peru) Sporting Cristal | Seoul, South Korea | | |
| 1979-05-04 | Friendly | — | 0–0 | — | (Peru) Sporting Cristal | Busan, South Korea | | |
| 1979-05-06 | Friendly | Park Yong-ju 76' | 1–1 | Bailetti 54' | (Peru) Sporting Cristal | Daegu, South Korea | | |
| 1979-05-08 | Friendly | — | 0–1 | Mosquera 86' | (Peru) Sporting Cristal | Seoul, South Korea | | |
| 1979-05-12 | Friendly | — | 0–1 | Aparicio 66' | (Peru) Sporting Cristal | Seoul, South Korea | | |
| 1979-07-09 | Friendly | — | 0–1 | Hrubesch 27' | (West Germany) Hamburger SV | Busan Gudeok Stadium; Busan, South Korea | | |
| 1979-07-11 | Friendly | — | 0–1 | Gorski 78' | (West Germany) Hamburger SV | Daegu Civic Stadium; Daegu, South Korea | | |
| 1979-07-14 | Friendly | Yoo Geon-su 25', 38' | 2–4 | Magath 8', 62'; Wehmeyer 16'; Gorski 70' | (West Germany) Hamburger SV | Gwangju Mudeung Stadium; Gwangju, South Korea | | |
| 1979-09-21 | 1979 Korea Cup | Cho Kwang-rae 27' | 1–2 (a.e.t.) | Castro 20'; Joadir Silva 95' | (Brazil) Vitória-ES | Seoul, South Korea | | |
| 1979-09-28 | Friendly | Park Sung-hwa 86' | 1–0 | — | (United States) New York Cosmos | Busan, South Korea | | |
| 1979-09-30 | Friendly | Huh Jung-moo 5'; Lee Jung-il 30'; Park Sung-hwa 81' | 3–2 | Chinaglia 53', 73' | (United States) New York Cosmos | Seoul, South Korea | | |

=== 1980s ===
| Date | Competition | Team scorer(s) | Score | Opponent scorer(s) | Opponent | Venue | Ref. | Note(s) |
|---|---|---|---|---|---|---|---|---|
| 1980-06-11 | Friendly | Huh Jung-moo 70' | 1–2 | Nachtweih 16'; Lorant 50' (pen.) | (West Germany) Eintracht Frankfurt | Seoul, South Korea | | |
| 1980-06-13 | Friendly | — | 0–1 | Cha Bum-kun 80' | (West Germany) Eintracht Frankfurt | Busan Gudeok Stadium; Busan, South Korea | | |
| 1980-06-15 | Friendly | Lee Jung-il 3'; Huh Jung-moo 83' | 2–3 | Cha Bum-kun 10'; Hölzenbein 15'; Nickel 55' | (West Germany) Eintracht Frankfurt | Seoul, South Korea | | |
| 1980-07-18 | Friendly | Choi Soon-ho 30' | 1–2 | Júlio 7'; Palhares 34' | (Portugal) Boavista | Seoul, South Korea | | |
| 1980-07-21 | Friendly | Choi Soon-ho 17'; Lee Kang-jo 60' | 2–0 | — | (Portugal) Boavista | Busan, South Korea | | |
| 1980-07-23 | Friendly | Choi Soon-ho 2' | 1–2 | Palhares 56' (pen.); Barbosa 88' | (Portugal) Boavista | Seoul, South Korea | | |
| 1981-02-21 | Friendly | Chung Hae-won 89' | 1–2 | Morales 54'; Bica 63' | (Uruguay) Nacional | Los Angeles, United States | | |
| 1981-02-24 | Friendly | — | 0–0 | — | (Mexico) Guadalajara | Los Angeles, United States | | |
| 1981-04-01 | Friendly | Hong Sung-ho 14'; Lee Tae-ho 63' | 2–2 | Marinho 37'; Souza 82' | (Brazil) Americano | Daegu, South Korea | | |
| 1981-04-05 | Friendly | Lee Young-moo 14' | 1–0 | — | (Brazil) Americano | Busan, South Korea | | |
| 1981-06-13 | 1981 Korea Cup | Byun Byung-joo 5' | 1–1 | Bellavia 51' | (France) Châteauroux | Seoul, South Korea | | |
| 1981-06-15 | 1981 Korea Cup | Lee Kang-jo 21'; Byun Byung-joo 41', 77'; Cho Kwang-rae 51' | 4–1 | Malek 56' | (West Germany) 1. FC Saarbrücken | Daejeon, South Korea | | |
| 1981-06-19 | 1981 Korea Cup | Byun Byung-Joo 74' | 1–1 | Ballejo 40' (pen.) | (Argentina) Racing (C) | Daegu, South Korea | | |
| 1981-06-24 | 1981 Korea Cup | Chung Hae-won 30'; Byun Byung-Joo 89' | 2–0 | — | (Uruguay) Danubio | Seoul, South Korea | | |
| 1981-06-26 | 1981 Korea Cup | Chung Hae-won 50'; Cho Kwang-rae 74' | 2–2 | Oyola 6'; Molina 54' | (Argentina) Racing (C) | Seoul, South Korea | | |
| 1981-09-07 | 1981 Pestabola Merdeka | — | 0–2 | Cabino Kupfer 14'; Luiz Barbosa 56' | (Brazil) São Paulo City XI | Kuala Lumpur, Malaysia | | |
| 1982-04-07 | Friendly | Kwon Oh-son 2'; Byun Byung-joo 16' | 2–3 | Thiele 50'; Ormslev 70'; Bommer 72' | (West Germany) Fortuna Düsseldorf | Seoul, South Korea | | |
| 1982-04-09 | Friendly | Kang Shin-woo 61' | 1–0 | — | (West Germany) Fortuna Düsseldorf | Busan, South Korea | | |
| 1982-04-11 | Friendly | Choi Gyeong-sik 45' (pen.); Cho Kwang-rae 71' | 2–1 | Wenzel 70' | (West Germany) Fortuna Düsseldorf | Gwangju, South Korea | | |
| 1982-05-08 | 1982 King's Cup | Kwon Oh-son 66' | 1–0 | — | (Indonesia) NIAC Mitra | Bangkok, Thailand | | |
| 1982-05-10 | 1982 King's Cup | Lee Kang-jo 6'; Choi Soon-ho 49' | 2–0 | — | (Indonesia) NIAC Mitra | Bangkok, Thailand | | |
| 1982-06-05 | 1982 Korea Cup | — | 0–2 | Van de Kerkhof 43'; Wildschut 65' | (Netherlands) PSV Eindhoven | Seoul, South Korea | | |
| 1982-06-19 | 1982 Korea Cup | — | 0–0 (a.e.t.) | — | (Brazil) Operário-MS | Gwangju, South Korea | | |
| 1982-10-23 | Friendly | Choi Gyeong-sik 69' (pen.) | 1–2 | Luizinho 36'; Santos 79' | (Brazil) Baraúnas | Busan, South Korea | | |
| 1982-10-25 | Friendly | — | 0–1 | Paulo 65' (pen.) | (Brazil) Baraúnas | Seoul, South Korea | | |
| 1982-10-28 | Friendly | Kang Shin-woo 16' | 1–2 | Neeskens 24'; Bogićević 39' | (United States) New York Cosmos | Jeonju, South Korea | | |
| 1982-10-30 | Friendly | — | 0–1 | Chinaglia 65' | (United States) New York Cosmos | Masan, South Korea | | |
| 1983-05-01 | Friendly | Lee Tae-ho 16'; Chung Yong-hwan 65' | 2–1 | Mendonça 23' | (Brazil) Portuguesa | Seoul, South Korea | | |
| 1983-06-04 | 1983 Korea Cup | Cho Min-kook 32'; Lee Tae-ho 71'; Byun Byung-joo 77' | 3–1 | Corti 52' | (Italy) Genoa | Seoul, South Korea | | |
| 1983-06-17 | 1983 Korea Cup | Choi Soon-ho 15'; Byun Byung-joo 36' | 2–3 | Koolhof 19', 56'; Thoresen 28' | (Netherlands) PSV Eindhoven | Seoul, South Korea | | |
| 1983-05-01 | Friendly | Lee Kil-yong 44', 89'; Byun Byung-joo 56' | 3–1 | Scheller 17' | (West Germany) Mainz 05 | Seoul, South Korea | | |
| 1983-07-26 | Friendly | Lee Tae-ho 72' | 1–2 | Aguirre 21'; Alderete 88' | (Mexico) América | Los Angeles, United States | | |
| 1984-03-01 | Friendly | Shin Yon-ho 63' | 1–1 | Kim Poong-joo 53' (o.g.) | (West Germany) Fortuna Düsseldorf | Busan, South Korea | | |
| 1984-03-03 | Friendly | Lee Kil-yong 51'; Kim Jong-boo 83' | 2–0 | — | (West Germany) Fortuna Düsseldorf | Seoul, South Korea | | |
| 1984-04-05 | Friendly | Byun Byung-joo 3', 50', 73'; Lee Chil-seong 70'; Shin Yon-ho 72'; Lee Tae-hyeong 78' | 6–0 | — | (Argentina) Independiente | Seoul, South Korea | | |
| 1984-05-30 | 1984 Korea Cup | Lee Tae-ho 40', 87'; Byun Byung-joo 83' | 3–2 | Winklhofer 39'; Hoerster 82' | (West Germany) Bayer Leverkusen | Seoul, South Korea | | |
| 1984-06-01 | 1984 Korea Cup | Byun Byung-joo 42'; Kim Jong-boo 75' | 2–2 | Velásquez 55'; La Rosa 76' | (Peru) Alianza Lima | Gwangju, South Korea | | |
| 1984-06-09 | 1984 Korea Cup | Kim Sam-soo 35'; Lee Kil-yong 61' | 2–1 | Kohn 89' | (West Germany) Bayer Leverkusen | Seoul, South Korea | | |
| 1984-10-02 | Friendly | — | 0–0 | — | (Brazil) Fluminense | Seoul, South Korea | | |
| 1985-06-04 | 1985 Korea Cup | Baek Jong-chul 75' | 1–1 | García 21' | (Argentina) Huracán | Seoul, South Korea | | |
| 1985-06-10 | 1985 Korea Cup | Cho Kwang-rae 20'; Lee Tae-ho 67' | 2–1 | Pereira 77' | (Uruguay) Central Español | Seoul, South Korea | | |
| 1985-06-10 | 1985 Korea Cup | Lee Tae-ho 50' | 1–1 | Ado 86' | (Brazil) Bangu | Seoul, South Korea | | |
| 1986-05-18 | Friendly | Cha Bum-kun 52'; Choi Soon-ho 82' | 2–0 | — | (Peru) Alianza Lima | Los Angeles, United States | | |
| 1987-06-16 | 1987 Korea Cup | Choi Soon-ho 14' (pen.); Choi Jin-han 17', 37' | 3–0 | — | (Argentina) Deportivo Español | Cheongju, South Korea | | |
| 1987-12-10 | 1987 Pestabola Merdeka | Lee Tae-ho 58'; Noh Soo-jin 68' | 2–1 | Gudelj 88' | (Socialist Federal Republic of Yugoslavia) Velež Mostar | Kuala Lumpur, Malaysia | | |
| 1987-12-12 | 1987 Pestabola Merdeka | Kim Sam-soo 62'; Bashkirov 73' (o.g.) | 2–1 | Storchak 2' | (Soviet Union) Dnepr Dnepropetrovsk | Kuala Lumpur, Malaysia | | |
| 1987-12-14 | 1987 Pestabola Merdeka | Byun Byung-joo 38'; Choi Soon-ho 60' | 2–0 | — | (Hungary) Újpest | Kuala Lumpur, Malaysia | | |
| 1988-06-21 | 1988 Korea Cup | Choi Sang-kook 23' | 1–2 | Pacheco 41'; Mariscal 85' | (Mexico) Atlas | Seoul, South Korea | | |
| 1988-06-24 | 1988 Korea Cup | Choi Soon-ho 72' | 1–0 | — | (Socialist Federal Republic of Yugoslavia) Velež Mostar | Seoul, South Korea | | |
| 1988-06-28 | 1988 Korea Cup | Lee Tae-ho 20', 64'; Kim Yong-se 34' | 3–2 | Ekarika 87'; Ekpo 89' | (Nigeria) Iwuanyanwu Nationale | Seoul, South Korea | | |
| 1988-07-23 | Friendly | Noh Soo-jin 7' | 1–1 | Barán 65' | (Uruguay) Peñarol | Seoul, South Korea | | |
| 1988-07-28 | Friendly | Kim Yong-se 12'; Byun Byung-joo 52' | 2–0 | — | (Uruguay) Peñarol | Busan, South Korea | | |
| 1988-08-09 | Friendly | Choi Yun-kyum 28'; Kim Joo-sung 47' | 2–2 | Pérez 52'; Paz 58' | (Argentina) Racing | Jeonju, South Korea | | |
| 1988-08-11 | Friendly | Choi Sang-kook 61', 69' | 2–2 | Acuña 40'; Colombatti 42' | (Argentina) Racing | Gwangju, South Korea | | |
| 1988-08-13 | Friendly | — | 0–0 | — | (Argentina) Racing | Daejeon, South Korea | | |
| 1989-03-01 | Friendly | Lee Tae-ho 69', 88' | 2–2 | Kulkov 32'; Kuznetsov 63' | (Soviet Union) Spartak Moscow | Busan, South Korea | | |
| 1989-03-04 | Friendly | — | 0–2 | Ivanov 8'; Shmarov 30' | (Soviet Union) Spartak Moscow | Seoul, South Korea | | |
| 1989-06-19 | 1989 Korea Cup | Choi Soon-ho 56' (pen.); Cho Keung-yeon 83' | 2–0 | — | (Portugal) Benfica | Daejeon, South Korea | | |
| 1989-06-24 | 1989 Korea Cup | — | 0–2 | Jensen 32'; Pingel 44' | (Denmark) Brøndby IF | Busan, South Korea | | |
| 1989-08-04 | Friendly | Hwang Sun-hong 56' | 1–0 | — | (Soviet Union) Metalist Kharkiv | Kharkiv, Soviet Union | | |
| 1989-08-07 | Friendly | Hwangbo Kwan 23'; Hwang Sun-hong 44' | 2–2 | Pasulko 9' (pen.); Kuznetsov 52' | (Soviet Union) Spartak Moscow | Moscow, Soviet Union | | |

=== 1990s ===
| Date | Competition | Team scorer(s) | Score | Opponent scorer(s) | Opponent | Venue | Ref. | Note(s) |
|---|---|---|---|---|---|---|---|---|
| 1990-02-22 | Friendly | Byun Byung-joo 25' | 1–1 | Ureña 7' | (Spain) Real Betis | Seville, Spain | | |
| 1990-03-08 | Friendly | Byun Byung-joo 52' | 1–0 | — | (Sweden) Malmö FF | Suwon Sports Complex; Suwon, South Korea | | |
| 1990-03-11 | Friendly | Byun Byung-joo 10' | 1–0 | — | (Sweden) Malmö FF | Jeju Stadium; Jeju City, South Korea | | |
| 1990-05-02 | Friendly | Hwang Sun-hong 23' | 1–1 | Caballero 77' | (Paraguay) Guaraní | Anyang Stadium; Anyang, South Korea | | |
| 1990-05-05 | Friendly | Choi Soon-ho 26' | 1–2 | Casco 73'; Caballero 85' | (Paraguay) Guaraní | Seoul Olympic Stadium; Seoul, South Korea | | |
| 1990-05-09 | 1990 Caltex Cup | Byun Byung-joo 56' (pen.) | 1–2 | Smith 29'; Dixon 68' | (England) Arsenal | Singapore | | |
| 1990-05-17 | Friendly | — | 0–1 | Cherenkov 32' | (Soviet Union) Spartak Moscow | Suwon Sports Complex; Suwon, South Korea | | |
| 1990-05-20 | Friendly | Byun Byung-joo 20' (pen.) | 1–3 | Morozov 14'; Rodionov 18', 52' | (Soviet Union) Spartak Moscow | Jeonju Sports Complex Stadium; Jeonju, South Korea | | |
| 1990-05-27 | Friendly | Noh Soo-jin 55' (pen.) | 1–1 | Sterath 21' | (Germany) Borussia Dortmund | Gangneung Stadium; Gangneung, South Korea | | |
| 1990-05-30 | Friendly | Hwangbo Kwan 21'; Noh Soo-jin 86'; Lee Young-jin 89' | 3–1 | Driller 61' | (Germany) Borussia Dortmund | Daegu Civic Stadium; Daegu, South Korea | | |
| 1993-06-21 | 1993 Korea Cup | Hwangbo Kwan 1'; Park Jung-bae 42'; Kim Jung-hyuk 63'; Jung Jae-kwon 86' | 4–0 | — | (Mexico) Atlante | Suncheon, South Korea | | |
| 1993-08-26 | Friendly | — | 0–0 | — | (Argentina) Vélez Sarsfield | Dongdaemun Stadium; Seoul, South Korea | | |
| 1993-08-29 | Friendly | Kim Hyun-seok 47' | 1–1 | Pico 9' | (Argentina) Vélez Sarsfield | Dongdaemun Stadium; Seoul, South Korea | | |
| 1993-09-17 | Friendly | Kim Hyun-seok 24' (pen.) | 1–1 | Mandrysz 83' | (Poland) Pogoń Szczecin | Dongdaemun Stadium; Seoul, South Korea | | |
| 1993-09-19 | Friendly | Kim Jung-hyuk 61' | 1–0 | — | (Poland) Pogoń Szczecin | Dongdaemun Stadium; Seoul, South Korea | | |
| 1994-05-12 | Friendly | Choi Dae-shik 33' (pen.); Hwang Sun-hong 38' | 2–2 | Ânderson 13'; Argel 67' | (Brazil) Internacional | Dongdaemun Stadium; Seoul, South Korea | | |
| 1994-05-14 | Friendly | — | 0–1 | Ânderson 57' | (Brazil) Internacional | Dongdaemun Stadium; Seoul, South Korea | | |
| 1994-05-18 | Friendly | Kim Hyun-seok 44'; Ha Seok-ju 60'; Choi Moon-sik 85' | 3–1 | Scholz 81' | (Germany) Bayer Leverkusen | Busan Gudeok Stadium; Busan, South Korea | | |
| 1994-05-22 | Friendly | Cho Jin-ho 41'; Kim Pan-keun 84' | 2–0 | — | (Germany) Bayer Leverkusen | Seoul Olympic Stadium; Seoul, South Korea | | |
| 1994-09-22 | Friendly | Ko Jeong-woon 16'; Cho Jin-ho 86' | 2–1 | Valdir Bigode 56' | (Brazil) Vasco da Gama | Dongdaemun Stadium; Seoul, South Korea | | |
| 1994-09-25 | Friendly | Hwang Sun-hong 35'; Cho Jin-ho 49'; Kang Chul 54'; Park Nam-yeol 81' | 4–4 | Valdir Bigode 18', 58', 83'; França 39' | (Brazil) Vasco da Gama | Ulsan Stadium; Ulsan, South Korea | | |
| 1995-06-03 | 1995 Korea Cup | Yoo Sang-chul 2', 29' | 2–0 | — | (Brazil) Carioca XI | Seoul Olympic Stadium; Seoul, South Korea | | |
| 1995-06-07 | 1995 Korea Cup | Hwang Sun-hong 27', 70'; Yoon Sang-chul 56'; Kim Pan-keun 58'; Roh Sang-rae 77' | 5–1 | Findlay 45' | (Scotland) Kilmarnock | Seoul, South Korea | | |
| 1995-09-30 | Friendly | Ha Seok-ju 45' | 1–2 | Mac Allister 41'; Martínez 89' | (Argentina) Boca Juniors | Seoul Olympic Stadium; Seoul, South Korea | | |
| 1996-05-24 | Friendly | Seo Jung-won 40'; Ko Jeong-woon 43'; Hwang Sun-hong 56' | 3–2 | Weah 4'; Locatelli 90' | (Italy) Milan | Seoul Olympic Stadium; Seoul, South Korea | | |
| 1996-05-27 | Friendly | Seo Jung-won 5'; Ko Jeong-woon 19'; Yoo Sang-chul 56'; Ha Seok-ju 90' | 4–0 | — | (Italy) Juventus | Seoul Olympic Stadium; Seoul, South Korea | | |
| 1996-06-01 | Friendly | Seo Jung-won 41' Roh Sang-rae 67' (pen.); Kim Do-hoon 78' | 3–4 | Élber 4'; Berthold 49'; Sigurðsson 64'; Haber 89' | (Germany) VfB Stuttgart | Suwon Sports Complex; Suwon, South Korea | | |
| 1998-02-13 | Friendly | Yang Hyun-jung 20' | 1–2 | Salapasidis 79'; Chipperfield 81' | (Australia) Wollongong Wolves | Wollongong Showground; Wollongong, Australia | | (Note: An Australian football website documented Brandon Park as the venue of the game.) |
| 1998-02-15 | Friendly | Choi Yong-soo 29' | 1–0 | — | (Australia) Sydney United | Parklea Stadium; Sydney, Australia | | |
| 1998-02-17 | Friendly | Choi Yong-soo 42', 56'; Yoo Sang-chul 74' | 3–1 | Maloney 40' | (Australia) Marconi | Marconi Stadium; Sydney, Australia | | |
| 1998-04-06 | Friendly | Jin Soon-jin 34' | 1–2 | Bassett 55'; Damet 62' | (France) Saint-Denis | Stade de France; Saint-Denis, France | | |
| 1998-04-11 | Friendly | Kim Do-keun 43'; Choi Yong-soo 67' | 2–1 | Saha 24' | (France) Metz | Stade Saint-Symphorien; Metz, France | | |

=== 2000s ===
| Date | Competition | Team scorer(s) | Score | Opponent scorer(s) | Opponent | Venue | Ref. | Note(s) |
|---|---|---|---|---|---|---|---|---|
| 2006-02-08 | Friendly | Lee Dong-gook 21'; Kim Do-heon 76'; Lee Chun-soo 78' | 3–0 | — | (United States) LA Galaxy | Los Angeles, United States | | |

== Other mentionable matches ==
The following matches are unreleased in official website of the KFA.

| Date | Competition | Team scorer(s) | Score | Opponent scorer(s) | Opponent | Venue | Ref. | Note(s) |
|---|---|---|---|---|---|---|---|---|
| 1967-06-04 | Friendly | Lee Yi-woo 70' | 1–2 | Lister 50'; Brayton 87' | (England) Middlesex Wanderers | Hyochang Stadium; Seoul, South Korea | | (Note: The first leg of the two-legged match was played by South Korea B.) |
| 1970-03-29 | Friendly | — | 0–0 | — | (Brazil) Flamengo | Dongdaemun Stadium; Seoul, South Korea | | |
| 1970-04-01 | Friendly | Lee Hoe-taik 35', 82' | 2–1 | Bexiga 66' | (Brazil) Flamengo | Dongdaemun Stadium; Seoul, South Korea | | |
| 1970-05-11 | Friendly | Jung Byung-tak 27' | 1–1 | Afonsinho 60' | (Brazil) Olaria | Dongdaemun Stadium; Seoul, South Korea | | |
| 1970-05-13 | Friendly | — | 0–0 | — | (Brazil) Olaria | Dongdaemun Stadium; Seoul, South Korea | | |
| 1970-07-05 | Friendly | Park Soo-il 24'; Jung Byung-tak 42' | 2–1 | Aabling 52' | (Denmark) Boldklubben 1903 | Dongdaemun Stadium; Seoul, South Korea | | |
| 1970-07-07 | Friendly | Kim Chang-il 78' | 1–1 | Flindt 87' | (Denmark) Boldklubben 1903 | Dongdaemun Stadium; Seoul, South Korea | | |
| 1970-09-05 | Friendly | Lee Hoe-taik 67' | 1–1 | Eusébio 85' (pen.) | (Portugal) Benfica | Dongdaemun Stadium; Seoul, South Korea | | |
| 1971-07-24 | Friendly | Chung Kyu-poong 11'; Park Lee-chun 47', 79' | 3–3 | Copland 39'; Gordon 42'; K. Cameron 67' | (Scotland) Dundee United | Dongdaemun Stadium; Seoul, South Korea | | |
| 1971-07-26 | Friendly | Park Su-deok 18', 28'; Park Soo-il 56' | 3–4 | A. Reid 25'; Reid 33'; Gordon 37'; K. Cameron 63' | (Scotland) Dundee United | Dongdaemun Stadium; Seoul, South Korea | | (Note: The second scorer of Dundee United is guessed to be Alex Reid or Ian Reid.) |
| 1972-05-28 | Friendly | — | 0–3 | Hunt 37'; Graham 51'; Mortimer 63' | (England) Coventry City | Dongdaemun Stadium; Seoul, South Korea | | |
| 1972-06-02 | Friendly | Cha Bum-kun 68'; Lee Hoe-taik 71' | 2–3 | Alcindo 32'; Pelé 57'; Leo Oliveira 86' | (Brazil) Santos | Dongdaemun Stadium; Seoul, South Korea | | |
| 1974-05-11 | 1974 Korea Cup | Park Lee-chun 41'; Cha Bum-kun 60', 87' | 3–0 | — | Japan B | Dongdaemun Stadium; Seoul, South Korea | | |
| 1974-05-15 | 1974 Korea Cup | Kim Jae-han 22'; Lee Hoe-taik 49'; Park Lee-chun 55', 79' | 4–0 | — | Malaysia B | Dongdaemun Stadium; Seoul, South Korea | | |
| 1974-05-20 | 1974 Korea Cup | Park Lee-chun 5', 27'; Ko Jae-wook 8'; Sukirman 32' (o.g.); Kim Jae-han 44', 74'; Cha Bum-kun 66' | 7–1 | Tumsila 16' | (Indonesia) PSMS Medan | Dongdaemun Stadium; Seoul, South Korea | | |
| 1986-05-14 | Friendly | Kang Deuk-soo 83' | 1–4 | Hateley 37'; Robson 41'; Dixon 61', 88' | England | Fountain Valley School; Colorado, United States | | |
| 2010-01-12 | Friendly | — | 0–0 | — | (South Africa) Platinum Stars | Royal Bafokeng Stadium; Rustenburg, South Africa | | |
| 2010-01-14 | Friendly | Lee Dong-gook 25', 30'; Kim Bo-kyung 49' | 3–1 | Makhubo 24' | (South Africa) Bay United | Port Elizabeth, South Africa | | |
| 2011-01-04 | Friendly | Lee Chung-yong 35'; Ki Sung-yueng 38' (pen.) | 2–0 | — | (United Arab Emirates) Al Jazira | Mohammed bin Zayed Stadium; Abu Dhabi, United Arab Emirates | | |

== Domestic matches ==
The following matches were played between South Korean teams.

| Date | Competition | Team scorer(s) | Score | Opponent scorer(s) | Opponent | Venue | Ref. | Note(s) |
|---|---|---|---|---|---|---|---|---|
| 1962-08-11 | Friendly | — | 0–0 | — | South Korea Military | Seoul, South Korea | | |
| 1962-08-12 | Friendly | Park Gyeong-hwa 65'; Cho Yoon-ok 66' | 2–0 | — | South Korea B | Seoul, South Korea | | |
| 1963-04-25 | Friendly | — | 0–1 | ? 73' (pen.) | South Korea B | Seoul, South Korea | | |
| 1964-08-15 | Friendly | | 1–3 | | South Korea B | Seoul, South Korea | | |
| 1964-09-20 | Friendly | Cho Yoon-ok 3', 8'; Cho Sung-dal 80' | 3–0 | — | South Korea B | Seoul, South Korea | | |
| 1964-09-21 | Friendly | Huh Yoon-jung 7'; Kim Sam-rak 41' ? (?) ? (?) | 4–0 | — | South Korea B | Seoul, South Korea | | |
| 1965-08-01 | Friendly | Huh Yoon-jung 75' | 1–1 | Kim Chang-eui 78' | (South Korea) Korea Tungsten | Seoul, South Korea | | |
| 1976-06-24 | Friendly | Park Sang-in 68' | 1–1 | Park Yong-ju 83' | South Korea B | Seoul, South Korea | | |
| 1976-06-26 | Friendly | — | 0–0 | — | South Korea B | Jeonju, South Korea | | |
| 1976-06-27 | Friendly | Kim Jin-kook 1'; Cha Bum-kun 40' | 2–3 | Cho Dong-hyun 58', 60'; Shin Hyun-ho 68' | South Korea B | Cheongju, South Korea | | |
| 1977-02-06 | Friendly | Cha Bum-kun 3'; Kim Kang-nam 51', 75'; Cho Kwang-rae 64'; Huh Jung-moo 88' | 5–0 | — | South Korea U20 | Busan, South Korea | | |
| 1977-12-18 | Friendly | Park Jong-won 50'; Kim Kang-nam 72' | 2–0 | — | South Korea B | Gwangju, South Korea | | |
| 1978-08-25 | Friendly | — | 0–1 | Park Chang-sun 73' | South Korea B | Busan, South Korea | | |
| 1978-08-27 | Friendly | Huh Jung-moo 40'; Park Sang-in 49'; Cha Bum-kun 63'; Kim Jae-han 70'; Kim Kang-nam 84' | 5–0 | — | South Korea B | Daegu, South Korea | | |
| 1978-09-19 | 1978 Korea Cup | Kim Jae-han 26' | 1–0 | — | South Korea B | Dongdaemun Stadium; Seoul, South Korea | | |
| 1979-09-19 | 1979 Korea Cup | Cho Kwang-rae 52', 75'; Huh Jung-moo 64', 89' | 4–1 | Park Hang-seo 31' | South Korea B | Dongdaemun Stadium; Seoul, South Korea | | |
| 1980-08-09 | Friendly | Hwang Seok-keun 5' | 1–0 | — | South Korea B | Gangneung, South Korea | | |
| 1980-08-15 | Friendly | Lee Tae-yeop (?); Lee Young-moo (?) | 3–0 | — | South Korea B | Cheongju, South Korea | | |
| 1980-08-17 | Friendly | Lee Tae-yeop 29'; Lee Young-moo 43' | 2–2 | Kim Yong-se 42'; Jo Gwan-seop 84' | South Korea B | Daejeon, South Korea | | |
| 1980-08-31 | 1980 Korea Cup | Chung Hae-won 39', 67'; Choi Soon-ho 44' | 3–0 | — | South Korea B | Busan, South Korea | | |
| 1981-01-25 | Friendly | Park Sung-hwa 25' | 1–0 | — | South Korea U20 | Busan, South Korea | | |
| 1981-01-26 | Friendly | Byun Byung-joo 74' | 1–1 | Choi Jong-gap 67' | South Korea B | Busan, South Korea | | |
| 1984-03-24 | Friendly | — | 0–0 | — | (South Korea) Yukong Elephants | Seoul, South Korea | | |
| 1985-06-17 | 1985 Korea Cup | Byun Byung-joo 74' | 1–0 | — | South Korea B | Seoul, South Korea | | |
| 1988-06-06 | Friendly | Lee Tae-ho 36' | 1–1 | Song Ju-seok 51' | South Korea B | Seoul, South Korea | | |
| 1996-04-21 | Friendly | Kim Do-hoon 15'; Hwang Sun-hong 42' | 2–1 | Lee Kyung-soo 41' | South Korea U23 | Seoul, South Korea | | |
| 2020-10-09 | Friendly | Lee Ju-yong 14'; Lee Jeong-hyeop 89' | 2–2 | Song Min-kyu 50'; Kwon Kyung-won 59' (o.g.) | South Korea U23 | Goyang, South Korea | | |
| 2020-10-12 | Friendly | Lee Dong-gyeong 55'; Lee Ju-yong 89'; Lee Yeong-jae 90+2' | 3–0 | — | South Korea U23 | Goyang, South Korea | | |

== See also ==
- South Korea national football team
- South Korea national football team results
