= 1983 President's Cup Football Tournament =

Sportseason of a Dutch football competition

1983 President's Cup
Tournament details
- Host country: South Korea
- Dates: 4–17 June
- Teams: 11

Final positions
- Champions: (Netherlands) PSV Eindhoven (1st title)
- Runners-up: South Korea
- Third place: Ghana
- Fourth place: United States (Olympic)

Tournament statistics
- Matches played: 29
- Goals scored: 86 (2.97 per match)
- Top scorer: (Netherlands) Jurrie Koolhof (6 goals)

The 1983 President's Cup Football Tournament (Korean: 제13회 대통령배 국제축구대회) was the 13th competition of Korea Cup. It was held from 4 to 17 June 1983, and was won by a Dutch club PSV Eindhoven for the first time, who defeated South Korea in the final.

== Group stage ==
=== Group A ===
Team	Pld	W	D	L	GF	GA	GD	Pts	Qualification
South Korea	5	5	0	0	13	1	+12	10	Qualification to semi-finals
United States (Olympic)	5	2	2	1	9	7	+2	6	Qualification to semi-finals
Nigeria	5	1	3	1	5	5	0	5	
(Italy) Genoa	5	2	1	2	9	10	−1	5	
Thailand	5	1	1	3	7	10	−3	3	
Indonesia	5	0	1	4	3	13	−10	1	

4 June 1983
15:30 KST

South Korea	3–1	(Italy) Genoa
Cho Min-kook 32'; Lee Tae-ho 71'; Byun Byung-joo 77'	Report	Corti 52'

Dongdaemun Stadium, Seoul

4 June 1983
17:15 KST

United States (Olympic)	2–2	Indonesia
Fox 24'; Abdullah 47' (o.g.)	Report	Narno 40', 88'

Dongdaemun Stadium, Seoul

4 June 1983
19:00 KST

Thailand	0–0	Nigeria

Dongdaemun Stadium, Seoul

6 June 1983
15:30 KST

Genoa (Italy)	3–0	Indonesia
Garlini (?)	Report

Suwon Sports Complex, Suwon

6 June 1983
17:15 KST

United States (Olympic)	1–1	Nigeria

Suwon Sports Complex, Suwon

6 June 1983
19:00 KST

South Korea	4–0	Thailand
Lee Sang-yong 4'; No In-ho 40', 89'; Lee Tae-ho 79'	Report

Suwon Sports Complex, Suwon

8 June 1983
16:30 KST

Thailand	3–0	Indonesia
? (?)

Dongdaemun Stadium, Seoul

8 June 1983
18:15 KST

Genoa (Italy)	0–3	United States (Olympic)
	Report	Aly 28'; Fox 69'; Lischner 71'

Dongdaemun Stadium, Seoul

8 June 1983
20:00 KST

South Korea	1–0	Nigeria
No In-ho 15'	Report

Dongdaemun Stadium, Seoul

10 June 1983
16:30 KST

Indonesia	1–2	Nigeria

Busan Gudeok Stadium, Busan

10 June 1983
18:15 KST

Genoa (Italy)	3–2	Thailand

Busan Gudeok Stadium, Busan

10 June 1983
20:00 KST

South Korea	2–0	United States (Olympic)
Cho Min-kook 29' (pen.), 40'	Report

Busan Gudeok Stadium, Busan

12 June 1983
20:00 KST

United States (Olympic)	3–2	Thailand

Jeonju Sports Complex, Jeonju

12 June 1983
20:00 KST

Genoa (Italy)	2–2	Nigeria

Jeonju Sports Complex, Jeonju

12 June 1983
20:00 KST

South Korea	3–0	Indonesia
Lee Sang-yong 19', 54'; Ahn Byung-tae 58'	Report

Jeonju Sports Complex, Jeonju

=== Group B ===
India was also in this group, but withdrew.

Team	Pld	W	D	L	GF	GA	GD	Pts	Qualification
(Netherlands) PSV Eindhoven	4	4	0	0	11	1	+10	8	Qualification to semi-finals
Ghana	4	2	0	2	6	5	+1	4	Qualification to semi-finals
(South Korea) Yukong Elephants	4	1	1	2	4	6	−2	3	
New Zealand	4	1	1	2	3	6	−3	3	
Sudan	4	0	2	2	2	8	−6	2	

5 June 1983
18:30 KST

PSV Eindhoven (Netherlands)	1–0	Ghana
Koolhof 69'	Report

Dongdaemun Stadium, Seoul

5 June 1983
20:15 KST

Yukong Elephants (South Korea)	2–0	New Zealand
Kim Yong-se 41'; Kim Kang-nam 46'	Report

Dongdaemun Stadium, Seoul

7 June 1983
15:30 KST

New Zealand	2–0	Ghana
Herbert 84'; Turner 87'	Report

Dongdaemun Stadium, Seoul

7 June 1983
17:15 KST

PSV Eindhoven (Netherlands)	4–0	Sudan
Huh Jung-moo 23'; Poortvliet 40'; Thoresen 42'; Van Aerle 56'	Report

Dongdaemun Stadium, Seoul

9 June 1983
18:30 KST

New Zealand	1–1	Sudan

Daegu Civic Stadium, Daegu

9 June 1983
20:15 KST

Yukong Elephants (South Korea)	1–3	Ghana
Park Yoon-ki 57'	Report	Choi Kyung-sik 6' (o.g.); Aziz 33'; Kouassi 53'

Daegu Civic Stadium, Daegu

11 June 1983
15:00 KST

New Zealand	0–3	(Netherlands) PSV Eindhoven
	Report	Poortvliet 44'; Lokhoff 48'; Koolhof 89'

Busan Gudeok Stadium, Busan

11 June 1983
16:45 KST

Yukong Elephants (South Korea)	0–0	Sudan

Busan Gudeok Stadium, Busan

13 June 1983
17:00 KST

Ghana	3–1	Sudan

Jeonju Sports Complex, Jeonju

13 June 1983
18:45 KST

Yukong Elephants (South Korea)	1–3	(Netherlands) PSV Eindhoven
23' Lee Kang-jo	Report	W. van de Kerkhof 39'; Poortvliet 49'; Van Duren 51'

Jeonju Sports Complex, Jeonju

== Knockout stage ==
=== Bracket ===
Semi-finals
15 June – Seoul
South Korea	1
Ghana	0
15 June – Seoul
(Netherlands) PSV Eindhoven (a.e.t.)	2
United States (Olympic)	1

Final
17 June – Seoul
South Korea	2
(Netherlands) PSV Eindhoven	3
Third place play-off
17 June – Seoul
Ghana	5
United States (Olympic)	0

=== Semi-finals ===
15 June 1983
18:00 KST

South Korea	1–0	Ghana
Lee Tae-ho 82'	Report

Dongdaemun Stadium, Seoul

15 June 1983
19:45 KST

PSV Eindhoven (Netherlands)	2–1 (a.e.t.)	United States (Olympic)
Stevens 70'; Koolhof 118'	Report	Maher 70'

Dongdaemun Stadium, Seoul

=== Third place play-off ===
17 June 1983
16:00 KST

Ghana	5–0	United States (Olympic)

Dongdaemun Stadium, Seoul

=== Final ===
17 June 1983
17:45 KST

South Korea	2–3	(Netherlands) PSV Eindhoven
Choi Soon-ho 15'; Byun Byung-joo 36'	Report	Koolhof 19', 56'; Thoresen 28'

Dongdaemun Stadium, Seoul

== Controversies ==
In a group stage match between Thailand and United States, a South Korean referee who judged the match was criticized for awarding a controversial penalty to United States. Phisit, Thailand's director and a vice-president of the Asian Football Confederation, seriously complained about it.

Ghana tried to withdraw from the third place play-off after losing to South Korea in the semi-finals, where two Ghanaian players were sent off with displeasure.

== See also ==
- Korea Cup
- South Korea national football team results
