= 1989 President's Cup International Football Tournament =

1989 President's Cup
Tournament details
- Host country: South Korea
- Dates: 17–26 June
- Teams: 8

Final positions
- Champions: Czechoslovakia (1st title)
- Runners-up: (Denmark) Brøndby IF
- Third place: South Korea
- Fourth place: (Portugal) Benfica

Tournament statistics
- Matches played: 16
- Goals scored: 41 (2.56 per match)
- Top scorer: (Czechoslovakia) Pavel Černý (5 goals)

The 1989 President's Cup International Football Tournament (Korean: 제18회 대통령배 국제축구대회) was the 18th competition of Korea Cup.

== First round ==
=== Group A ===
Team	Pld	W	D	L	GF	GA	GD	Pts	Qualification
South Korea	3	2	1	0	6	1	+5	5	Qualification to final round
(Portugal) Benfica	3	2	0	1	4	3	+1	4	Qualification to final round
Hungary U21	3	1	0	2	1	5	–4	2	
United States U21	3	0	1	2	2	4	–2	1	

17 June 1989
18:00 KST

South Korea	1–1	United States U21
Hwang Sun-hong 16'	Report	Henderson 62'

Seoul Olympic Stadium, Seoul

17 June 1989
20:00 KST

Benfica (Portugal)	2–0	Hungary U21
Garcia 13'; Alcântara 62'	Report

Seoul Olympic Stadium, Seoul

19 June 1989
19:00 KST

South Korea	2–0	(Portugal) Benfica
Choi Soon-ho 56' (pen.); Cho Keung-yeon 83'	Report

Daejeon Hanbat Sports Complex, Daejeon

19 June 1989
17:00 KST

Hungary U21	1–0	United States U21
László 79'	Report

Daejeon Hanbat Sports Complex, Daejeon

21 June 1989
19:00 KST

South Korea	3–0	Hungary U21
Hwang Sun-hong 48'; Hwangbo Kwan 66'; Park Yang-ha 78'	Report

Gwangju Mudeung Stadium, Gwangju

21 June 1989
17:00 KST

Benfica (Portugal)	2–1	United States U21
Miranda 41'; Alcântara 75'	Report	Snow 22'

Gwangju Mudeung Stadium, Gwangju

=== Group B ===
Team	Pld	W	D	L	GF	GA	GD	Pts	Qualification
Czechoslovakia	3	3	0	0	7	2	+5	6	Qualification to final round
(Denmark) Brøndby IF	3	1	0	2	3	4	–1	2	Qualification to final round
(Uruguay) Nacional	3	1	0	2	2	3	–1	2	
South Korea B	3	1	0	2	4	7	–3	2	

18 June 1989
15:00 KST

Brøndby IF (Denmark)	1–2	Czechoslovakia
Christofte 76'	Report	Moravčík 30'; Šimůnek 36'

Anyang Stadium, Anyang

18 June 1989
16:50 KST

South Korea B	1–2	(Uruguay) Nacional
Lee Tae-ho 42'	Report	Fonseca 48'; Valdés 53'

Anyang Stadium, Anyang

20 June 1989
15:00 KST

Brøndby IF (Denmark)	1–0	(Uruguay) Nacional
Christensen 16'	Report

Gangneung Stadium, Gangneung

20 June 1989
16:50 KST

South Korea B	1–4	Czechoslovakia
Ham Hyun-gi 65'	Report	Kadlec 27'; Černý 43'; Lee Heung-sil 54' (o.g.); Stanislav 87'

Gangneung Stadium, Gangneung

22 June 1989
17:00 KST

(Uruguay) Nacional	0–1	Czechoslovakia
	Report	Moravčík 52'

Daegu Civic Stadium, Daegu

22 June 1989
19:00 KST

South Korea B	2–1	(Denmark) Brøndby IF
Lee Tae-ho 54'; Cho Deok-je 81'	Report	Christofte 40' (pen.)

Daegu Civic Stadium, Daegu

== Final round ==
Team	Pld	W	D	L	GF	GA	GD	Pts
Czechoslovakia	3	2	1	0	7	3	+4	5
(Denmark) Brøndby IF	3	2	0	1	6	2	+4	4
South Korea	3	1	1	1	2	2	0	3
(Portugal) Benfica	3	0	0	3	2	10	–8	0

24 June 1989
17:00 KST

South Korea	0–2	(Denmark) Brøndby IF
	Report	Jensen 32'; Pingel 44'

Busan Gudeok Stadium, Busan

24 June 1989
19:00 KST

Czechoslovakia	5–2	(Portugal) Benfica
Černý 23', 40', 50', 71'; Weiss 76'	Report	Lima 79', 82'

Busan Gudeok Stadium, Busan

26 June 1989
17:00 KST

Brøndby IF (Denmark)	3–0	(Portugal) Benfica
Hernâni 25' (o.g.); Vilfort 47'; Christofte 54'	Report

Seoul Olympic Stadium, Seoul

26 June 1989
19:00 KST

South Korea	0–0	Czechoslovakia
	Report

Seoul Olympic Stadium, Seoul

== See also ==
- Korea Cup
- South Korea national football team results
