= 1978 President Park's Cup Football Tournament =

1978 President Park's Cup
Tournament details
- Host country: South Korea
- Dates: 9–21 September
- Teams: 15

Final positions
- Champions: South Korea (5th title)
- Runners-up: (United States) Washington Diplomats
- Third place: South Korea B
- Fourth place: (Morocco) AS FAR

Tournament statistics
- Matches played: 29
- Goals scored: 104 (3.59 per match)
- Top scorer: (South Korea) Kim Jae-han (6 goals)

The 1978 President Park's Cup Football Tournament (Korean: 제8회 박대통령컵 쟁탈 국제축구대회) was the eighth competition of Korea Cup. It was held from 9 to 21 September 1978, and was won by South Korea for the fifth time, who defeated Washington Diplomats in the final.

== Group stage ==
=== Group A ===
Team	Pld	W	D	L	GF	GA	GD	Pts	Qualification
South Korea	3	2	1	0	8	5	+3	5	Qualification to quarter-finals
(United States) Washington Diplomats	3	2	0	1	7	5	+2	4	Qualification to quarter-finals
Malaysia	3	1	1	1	4	5	−1	3	
Bahrain	3	0	0	3	4	8	−4	0	

9 September 1978
15:30 UTC+9

South Korea	3–2	(United States) Washington Diplomats
Kim Jae-han 32', 82'; Kim Kang-nam 68'	Report; Newscast	Irwin 25'; Graydon 48' (pen.)

Dongdaemun Stadium, Seoul

9 September 1978
15:30 UTC+9

Malaysia	2–1	Bahrain
Abdah 32'; ? 82'	Report	Salman 34'

Dongdaemun Stadium, Seoul

11 September 1978
18:00 UTC+9

Washington Diplomats (United States)	3–2	Bahrain
Bakić (?)

Busan Gudeok Stadium, Busan

11 September 1978
19: 45 UTC+9

South Korea	2–2	Malaysia
Kim Jae-han 67', 77'	Report 1 Report 2	Bakri 19'; Hamidon (Note: Korea Football Association documented Reduan Abdullah as Malaysian second goalscorer unlike newspapers of that time.) 47'

Busan Gudeok Stadium, Busan

13 September 1978
17:00 UTC+9

Malaysia	0–2	(United States) Washington Diplomats

Daegu Civic Stadium, Daegu

13 September 1978
19:00 UTC+9

South Korea	3–1	Bahrain
Huh Jung-moo 23'; Lee Young-moo 28'; Kim Sung-nam 64'	Report	I. Farhan 16'

Daegu Civic Stadium, Daegu

=== Group B ===
Team	Pld	W	D	L	GF	GA	GD	Pts	Qualification
(Iran) PAS Tehran	3	3	0	0	7	2	+5	6	Qualification to quarter-finals
(Morocco) AS FAR	3	1	1	1	4	3	+1	3	Qualification to quarter-finals
New Zealand	3	1	0	2	4	5	−1	2	
(West Germany) Eintracht Frankfurt II	3	0	1	2	2	7	−5	1	

11 September 1978
17:00 UTC+9

PAS Tehran (Iran)	2–1	New Zealand
Behtash Fariba 32'; Faramarz Ezzati 42'	Report	Mike Simonoff 31'

Daegu Civic Stadium, Daegu

11 September 1978
19:00 UTC+9

Eintracht Frankfurt II (West Germany)	1–1	(Morocco) AS FAR

Daegu Civic Stadium, Daegu

13 September 1978
18:00 UTC+9

New Zealand	0–3	(Morocco) AS FAR

Busan Gudeok Stadium, Busan

13 September 1978
19:45 UTC+9

PAS Tehran (Iran)	3–1	(West Germany) Eintracht Frankfurt II

Busan Gudeok Stadium, Busan

15 September 1978
18:00 UTC+9

New Zealand	3–0	(West Germany) Eintracht Frankfurt II

Dongdaemun Stadium, Seoul

15 September 1978
19:45 UTC+9

PAS Tehran (Iran)	2–0	(Morocco) AS FAR

Dongdaemun Stadium, Seoul

=== Group C ===
Team	Pld	W	D	L	GF	GA	GD	Pts	Qualification
Mexico XI	2	2	0	0	9	1	+8	4	Qualification to quarter-finals
United States Olympic (Note: The United States, which was possessing a professional league, could call up non-professional players for the Olympic team until 1980.)	2	1	0	1	6	3	+3	2	Qualification to quarter-finals
Lebanon	2	0	0	2	2	13	−11	0	

10 September 1978
15:45 UTC+9

Lebanon	1–7	Mexico XI
Kapila 15'	Report	Morales 20'; Sánchez 32'; Montes (?); ? (?); ? (?)

Jeonju Sports Complex, Jeonju

12 September 1978
15:00 UTC+9

Mexico XI	2–0	United States Olympic

Gwangju Mudeung Stadium, Gwangju

14 September 1978
19:00 UTC+9

Lebanon	1–6	United States Olympic

Dongdaemun Stadium, Seoul

=== Group D ===
Team	Pld	W	D	L	GF	GA	GD	Pts	Qualification
(Brazil) Paulista U21	3	3	0	0	9	0	+9	6	Qualification to quarter-finals
South Korea B	3	1	1	1	5	7	−2	3	Qualification to quarter-finals
Thailand	3	1	0	2	4	6	−2	2	
Indonesia	3	0	1	2	1	6	−5	1	

10 September 1978
14:00 UTC+9

Indonesia	0–2	Thailand

Jeonju Sports Complex, Jeonju

10 September 1978
15:00 UTC+9

South Korea B	0–4	(Brazil) Paulista U21
	Report	Ricardo 4'; Carlos Roberto 44', 88'; Taddei 58'

Dongdaemun Stadium, Seoul

12 September 1978
14:00 UTC+9

Paulista U21 (Brazil)	2–0	Thailand
Carlos Roberto 31'; Taddei 39'	Report

Jeonju Sports Complex, Jeonju

12 September 1978
15:45 UTC+9

South Korea B	1–1	Indonesia
Park Chang-sun 14'	Report	Ismanto 28'

Jeonju Sports Complex, Jeonju

14 September 1978
14:00 UTC+9

Paulista U21 (Brazil)	3–0	Indonesia

Gwangju Mudeung Stadium, Gwangju

14 September 1978
15:45 UTC+9

South Korea B	4–2	Thailand
Park Min-jae 18', 31', 45'; Kim Chang-ho 57'	Report 1 Report 2	Boonlert 14'; Thaweerat 40'

Gwangju Mudeung Stadium, Gwangju

== Knockout stage ==
=== Bracket ===
Quarter-finals
16 September – Seoul
South Korea	4
United States Olympic	1
17 September – Seoul
(Iran) PAS Tehran	1
South Korea B	2
16 September – Seoul
Mexico XI	0
(United States) Washington Diplomats	3
17 September – Seoul
(Brazil) Paulista U21	0
(Morocco) AS FAR	1

Semi-finals
19 September – Seoul
South Korea	1
South Korea B	0
19 September – Seoul
(United States) Washington Diplomats	3
(Morocco) AS FAR	1

Final
21 September – Seoul
South Korea	6
(United States) Washington Diplomats	2
Third place play-off
21 September – Seoul
South Korea B	2
(Morocco) AS FAR	1

=== Quarter-finals ===
16 September 1978
14:00 UTC+9

Mexico XI	0–3	(United States) Washington Diplomats
	Report	Child (?); Bakić (?)

Dongdaemun Stadium, Seoul

16 September 1978
15:45 UTC+9

South Korea	4–1	United States Olympic
Cha Bum-kun 46', 68'; Kim Kang-nam 57', 59'	Report	Garcia 19'

Dongdaemun Stadium, Seoul

17 September 1978
14:00 UTC+9

PAS Tehran (Iran)	1–2	South Korea B
Fariba 38'	Report	Oh Seok-jae 14'; Park Chang-sun 83'

Dongdaemun Stadium, Seoul

17 September 1978
15:45 UTC+9

Paulista U21 (Brazil)	0–1	(Morocco) AS FAR
	Report	Larbi 71'

Dongdaemun Stadium, Seoul

=== Semi-finals ===
19 September 1978
17:00 UTC+9

South Korea	1–0	South Korea B
Kim Jae-han 26'	Report

Dongdaemun Stadium, Seoul

19 September 1978
18:45 UTC+9

Washington Diplomats (United States)	3–1	(Morocco) AS FAR
Child 55', 86'; Graydon 89'	Report	Driss 29' (pen.)

Dongdaemun Stadium, Seoul

=== Third place play-off ===
21 September 1978
17:00 UTC+9

South Korea B	2–1	(Morocco) AS FAR
Park Chang-sun 10', 73'	Report; Newscast	Mustapha 47'

Dongdaemun Stadium, Seoul

=== Final ===
21 September 1978
18:45 UTC+9

South Korea	6–2	(United States) Washington Diplomats
Cho Kwang-rae 1'; Huh Jung-moo 16'; Kim Kang-nam 29'; Kim Jae-han 48'; Park Sang-in 67'; Shin Hyun-ho 75'	Report; Newscast	Bakić 53'; Stokes 89'

Dongdaemun Stadium, Seoul

== See also ==
- Korea Cup
- South Korea national football team results
