= 1980 President's Cup Football Tournament =

1980 President's Cup
Tournament details
- Host country: South Korea
- Dates: 23 August – 2 September
- Teams: 6

Final positions
- Champions: South Korea (6th title)
- Runners-up: Indonesia
- Third place: South Korea B
- Fourth place: Thailand B

Tournament statistics
- Matches played: 16
- Goals scored: 43 (2.69 per match)
- Top scorer(s): (South Korea) Chung Hae-won (7 goals)

The 1980 President's Cup Football Tournament (Korean: 제10회 대통령배 국제축구대회) was the tenth competition of Korea Cup. It was held from 23 August to 2 September 1980, and was won by South Korea for the sixth time, who defeated Indonesia in the final.

== Group stage ==
Team	Pld	W	D	L	GF	GA	GD	Pts	Qualification
South Korea	5	5	0	0	17	0	+17	10	Qualification to final
Indonesia	5	2	2	1	7	8	−1	6	Qualification to final
South Korea B	5	2	2	1	4	5	−1	6	
Thailand B	5	2	1	2	7	8	−1	5	
Malaysia B	5	0	2	3	3	9	−6	2	
Bahrain B	5	0	1	4	3	11	−8	0	

23 August 1980
15:30 UTC+9

South Korea	2–0	Malaysia B
Hwang Seok-keun 68', 78'	Report

Dongdaemun Stadium, Seoul
Attendance: 30,000

23 August 1980
17:15 UTC+9

Indonesia	2–1	Thailand B

Dongdaemun Stadium, Seoul

23 August 1980
19:00 UTC+9

South Korea B	1–0	Bahrain B
Park Yoon-ki 61'	Report

Dongdaemun Stadium, Seoul

25 August 1980
13:00 UTC+9

Malaysia B	1–1	Bahrain B

Chuncheon Civic Stadium, Chuncheon

25 August 1980
14:45 UTC+9

South Korea B	1–1	Thailand B
Park Hang-seo 57'	Report	Pichai 73'

Chuncheon Civic Stadium, Chuncheon

25 August 1980
16:30 UTC+9

South Korea	3–0	Indonesia
Choi Soon-ho 19'; Chung Hae-won 40'; Lee Kang-jo 83' (pen.)	Report

Chuncheon Civic Stadium, Chuncheon
Attendance: 25,000

27 August 1980
13:00 UTC+9

Indonesia	3–2	Bahrain B

Daejeon Hanbat Sports Complex, Daejeon

27 August 1980
14:45 UTC+9

South Korea B	1–0	Malaysia B
Park Yoon-ki 88'	Report

Daejeon Hanbat Sports Complex, Daejeon

27 August 1980
16:30 UTC+9

South Korea	4–0	Thailand B
Choi Soon-ho 24'; Lee Tae-yeop 38'; Lee Tae-ho 50' (pen.); Chung Hae-won 55'	Report

Daejeon Hanbat Sports Complex, Daejeon

29 August 1980
13:00 UTC+9

Malaysia B	1–4	Thailand B

Gwangju Mudeung Stadium, Gwangju

29 August 1980
14:45 UTC+9

South Korea B	1–1	Indonesia
Byun Il-woo 18'	Report	Pattinasarany 7'

Gwangju Mudeung Stadium, Gwangju

29 August 1980
16:30 UTC+9

South Korea	5–0	Bahrain B
Chung Hae-won 33', 85'; Lee Kang-jo 34'; Cho Kwang-rae 44'; Lee Tae-ho 69'	Report

Gwangju Mudeung Stadium, Gwangju
Attendance: 20,000

31 August 1980
15:00 UTC+9

Thailand B	1–0	Bahrain B

Busan Gudeok Stadium, Busan

31 August 1980
16:45 UTC+9

Malaysia B	1–1	Indonesia

Busan Gudeok Stadium, Busan

31 August 1980
18:30 UTC+9

South Korea	3–0	South Korea B
Chung Hae-won 39', 67'; Choi Soon-ho 44'	Report

Busan Gudeok Stadium, Busan

== Final ==
2 September 1979
18:00 UTC+9

South Korea	2–0	Indonesia
Chung Hae-won 30'; Lee Kang-jo 89'	Report

Dongdaemun Stadium, Seoul
Attendance: 10,000

== See also ==
- Korea Cup
- South Korea national football team results
