= 1982 King's Cup =

Tournament details
- Host country: Thailand
- Dates: 1–17 May
- Teams: 9
- Venue: (in 1 host city)

Final positions
- Champions: Thailand (5th title)
- Runners-up: South Korea
- Third place: Thailand B
- Fourth place: Singapore

Tournament statistics
- Matches played: 28
- Goals scored: 72 (2.57 per match)

The 1982 King's Cup was held from 1 to 17 May 1982 in Bangkok. Nine teams from eight nations participated.

== Round 1 ==
=== Group A ===
Team	Pld	W	D	L	GF	GA	GD	Pts
(China) Tianjin	4	2	2	0	8	2	+6	6
Thailand	4	2	2	0	7	3	+4	6
Singapore	4	2	2	0	5	2	+3	6
Nepal	4	1	0	3	2	9	−7	2
Philippines	4	0	0	4	0	6	−6	0

Source: RSSSF
1 May 1982

Tianjin (China)	4–0	Nepal

Bangkok
1 May 1982

Thailand	1–1	Singapore
Prapan Premsiri 5'		Malek Awab 11'

Bangkok

2 May 1982

Nepal	1–0	Philippines
Ganesh Thapa 13'

Bangkok

3 May 1982

Tianjin (China)	1–1	Singapore
Zhang Guilai 33'		Malek Awab 28'

Bangkok

4 May 1982

Thailand	2–0	Philippines

Bangkok

5 May 1982

Singapore	2–0	Nepal
Fandi Ahmad 35', 84'

Bangkok

6 May 1982

Singapore	1–0	Philippines
Au-Yeong Pak Kuan 80' (pen.)

Bangkok

6 May 1982

Tianjin (China)	1–1	Thailand
Wang Qunfa 36'		Piyapong Pue-on 70'

Bangkok

7 May 1982

Tianjin (China)	2–0	Philippines
Chen Xibo 5'; Zuo Shusheng 30'

Bangkok

7 May 1982

Thailand	3–1	Nepal
Piyapong Pue-on 13'; Chalor Hongkajohn 17', 40'		Ganesh Thapa 56'

Bangkok

=== Group B ===
Team	Pld	W	D	L	GF	GA	GD	Pts
South Korea	3	3	0	0	11	0	+11	6
Thailand B	3	2	0	1	6	7	−1	4
(Indonesia) Niac Mitra	3	0	1	2	3	5	−2	1
Malaysia All-Stars	3	0	1	2	1	9	−8	1

Source: RSSSF

Note: Malaysia's team was also reported as Kelantan by a Thai source.

2 May 1982

South Korea	5–0	Thailand B
Byun Byung-joo; Cho Kwang-rae; Hwang Seok-keun; Lee Tae-ho; Choi Soon-ho

Bangkok

2 May 1982

Niac Mitra (Indonesia)	1–1	Malaysia All-Stars

Bangkok

4 May 1982

Thailand B	2–2	(Indonesia) Niac Mitra

Bangkok

5 May 1982

South Korea	5–0	Malaysia All-Stars
Chung Hae-won; Byun Byung-joo; Choi Soon-ho; Lee Kang-jo; Lee Tae-ho

Bangkok

8 May 1982

South Korea	1–0	(Indonesia) Niac Mitra
Kwon Oh-son 66'

Bangkok

8 May 1982

Thailand B	3–0	Malaysia All-Stars
Alongkote Benjapark 39'; Narong Ajarayudht 52'; Athaporn Pansook 88'

Bangkok

== Round 2 ==
=== Group A ===
Team	Pld	W	D	L	GF	GA	GD	Pts
Singapore	2	1	1	0	3	2	+1	3
Thailand B	2	0	2	0	2	3	−1	2
(China) Tianjin	2	0	1	1	2	3	−1	1

Source: RSSSF
9 May 1982

Thailand B	1–1	(China) Tianjin
Boonnum Suksawat 4'		Han Yuhuan 7'

Bangkok

10 May 1982

Singapore	2–1	(China) Tianjin
Malek Awab 30'; Fandi Ahmad 69'		Chen Xibo 24'

Bangkok

11 May 1982

Singapore	1–1	Thailand B
Fandi Ahmad 41'		? 33'

Bangkok

=== Group B ===
Team	Pld	W	D	L	GF	GA	GD	Pts
South Korea	2	2	0	0	5	0	+5	4
Thailand	2	1	0	1	3	3	0	2
(Indonesia) Niac Mitra	2	0	0	2	0	5	−5	0

Source: RSSSF
9 May 1982

Thailand	0–3	South Korea
		Hwang Seok-keun 18'; Chung Hae-won 38'; Lee Tae-ho 68' (pen.)

Bangkok

10 May 1982

Niac Mitra Indonesia	0–2	South Korea
		Lee Kang-jo; Choi Soon-ho

Bangkok

11 May 1982

Thailand	3–1	(Indonesia) Niac Mitra

Bangkok

== Knockout stage ==
=== Semi-finals ===
==== First legs ====
13 May 1982

Thailand	1–0	Singapore
Chalor Hongkajohn 74'

Bangkok

13 May 1982

Thailand B	0–1	South Korea

Bangkok

==== Second legs ====
15 May 1982

Thailand	2–2	Singapore

Bangkok

15 May 1982

Thailand B	1–3	South Korea
		Choi Soon-ho; Lee Kang-jo

Bangkok

=== Third place play-off ===
17 May 1982

Thailand B	2–2	Singapore
Penalties
	3–2

Bangkok

Note: No extra time was played. The score is also reported as 0–0, 5–4 on penalty shoot-out.

=== Final ===
17 May 1982

Thailand	0–0 (a.e.t.)	South Korea
Penalties
	4–3

Bangkok
