= Michael Lester =

Michael Lester may refer to:

- Mike Lester (footballer) (born 1954), English footballer
- Mike Lester (born 1955), American conservative editorial cartoonist
