= Roggensack =

Roggensack is a surname. Notable people with the surname include:

- Gerd Roggensack (1941–2024), German football player and manager
- Olaf Roggensack (born 1997), German rower
- Patience D. Roggensack (born 1940), American attorney and jurist
