= 1981 Jakarta Anniversary Tournament =

Tournament details
- Host country: Indonesia
- Dates: 13–21 August
- Teams: 8

Final positions
- Champions: South Korea (1st title); Bulgaria XI (1st title)
- Third place: (Mexico) Univ. de Guadalajara
- Fourth place: Indonesia

Tournament statistics
- Matches played: 16

The 1981 Jakarta Anniversary Tournament was held from August 13 to 21 in Jakarta. Eight teams participated.

== Group stage ==
=== Group A ===
Team	Pld	W	D	L	GF	GA	GD	Pts
(Mexico) Univ. de Guadalajara	3	2	1	0	19	1	+18	5
Indonesia	3	2	1	0	5	1	+4	5
Philippines	3	1	0	2	2	15	−13	2
Malaysia B	3	0	0	3	0	9	−9	0

14 August 1981

Malaysia B	0–6	(Mexico) Univ. de Guadalajara

Jakarta
14 August 1981

Indonesia	3–0	Philippines

Jakarta

16 August 1981

Indonesia	1–0	Malaysia B

Jakarta
16 August 1981

Philippines	0–12	(Mexico) Univ. de Guadalajara

Jakarta

18 August 1981

Philippines	2–0	Malaysia B

Jakarta
18 August 1972

Indonesia	1–1	(Mexico) Univ. de Guadalajara

Jakarta

=== Group B ===
Team	Pld	W	D	L	GF	GA	GD	Pts
South Korea	3	2	1	0	11	1	+10	5
Bulgaria XI	3	2	1	0	7	3	+4	5
Indonesia B	3	1	0	2	2	10	−8	2
Thailand B	3	0	0	3	1	7	−6	0

Note: Indonesia B was Niac Mitra with 5 additional players.

13 August 1981

Indonesia B	1–3	Thailand B

Jakarta
13.08.1981

South Korea	1–1	Bulgaria XI
Cho Kwang-rae

Jakarta

15 August 1981

South Korea	8–0	Indonesia B
Hwang Seok-keun (?); Lee Kan-jo (?); Byun Byung-joo; Lee Tae-ho; Cho Kwang-rae

Jakarta
15 August 1981

Bulgaria XI	4–1	Thailand B

Jakarta

17 August 1981

South Korea	2–0	Thailand B
Hwang Seok-keun (?)

Jakarta
17 August 1981

Indonesia B	1–2	Bulgaria XI

Jakarta

== Knockout stage ==
Semi-finals
20 August
Indonesia	0
South Korea	1
20 August
Bulgaria XI	?
(Mexico) Univ. de Guadalajara	?

Final
21 August
South Korea	2
Bulgaria XI	2
Third place
21 August
Indonesia	0
(Mexico) Univ. de Guadalajara	3

=== Semi-finals ===
20 August 1981

Indonesia	0–1	South Korea
		Hwang Seok-keun

Jakarta
20 August 1981

Bulgaria XI	(Note: Bulgaria XI defeated Univ. de Guadalajara; scoreline is unknown.)	(Mexico) Univ. de Guadalajara

Jakarta

=== Third place play-off ===
21 August 1981

Indonesia	0–3	(Mexico) Univ. de Guadalajara
		(?)

Jakarta

=== Final ===
21 August 1972

South Korea	2–2 (a.e.t.)	Bulgaria XI
Byun Byung-joo; Choi Kyung-shik

Jakarta

Trophy shared
