= Nam Ki-young =

South Korean footballer and manager

Nam Ki-young 남기영
Personal information
- Full name: Nam Ki-young
- Date of birth: July 10, 1962 (age 64)
- Position: Defender

Youth career
- 1982–1985: Kyung Hee University

Senior career*
Years	Team	Apps	(Gls)
1986–1992	POSCO Atoms	131	(1)

International career^{‡}
1985	South Korea B	?	(?)
1987–1990	South Korea	3	(0)

Managerial career
- 1997–2024: Cheongjudaesung High School
- * Club domestic league appearances and goals as of 28 July 2021 ‡ National team caps and goals as of 28 July 2021

Nam Ki-young (born July 10, 1962) is a former South Korean footballer who played as a defender.

Nam spent his entire career for the POSCO Atoms, now the Pohang Steelers, and represented South Korea at the 1988 Summer Olympics on home soil. In 1987, he collided with Daewoo Royals striker Lee Tae-ho and injured his right eye. Lee eventually lost all vision in said eye and became the first visually-impaired player at a FIFA World Cup. Coincidentally, both Nam and Lee were on the 1988 Olympics squad, yet the former never played.

After retiring, Nam worked as a referee until 1997, where he returned to coach the football team of his alma mater, Cheongjudaesung High School, until 2024.
