= Luis Caballero (footballer) =

Paraguayan footballer (1962-2005)

Luis Neri Caballero
Personal information
- Full name: Luis Neri Caballero Núñez
- Date of birth: 17 September 1962
- Place of birth: Asunción, Paraguay
- Date of death: 6 May 2005 (aged 42)
- Place of death: Asunción, Paraguay
- Position: Central defender

Senior career*
Years	Team	Apps	(Gls)
- Guaraní
- Olimpia Asunción
- Sol de América
1990–1994	Deportivo Mandiyú	120	(2)

International career
1983–1989	Paraguay	27	(0)
- * Club domestic league appearances and goals

Luis Neri Caballero Núñez (17 September 1962 – 6 May 2005) was a football defender from Paraguay. He played professional football in Paraguay, and had short spells in Argentina, in Deportivo Mandiyú. His son (born 1990), named Luis Caballero as well, also played professional football in Paraguay.

== Career ==
A central defender, Caballero played for Club Guaraní, Club Olimpia, Club Sol de América and Deportivo Mandiyú. He played for Deportivo Mandiyú from 1990 to 1994.

Caballero made his international debut for the Paraguay national football team on 7 September 1988 in a friendly match against Ecuador (1-5 win) in Guayaquil. A participant at the 1986 FIFA World Cup in Mexico, he obtained a total number of 27 international caps from 1983 to 1989.

== Personal ==
Caballero was killed during a robbery at his office in Villa Morra on 6 May 2005.
