= Bernd Gorski =

German footballer and manager

Personal information
- Date of birth: 4 October 1959 (age 67)
- Place of birth: Hamburg, West Germany
- Height: 1.83 m (6 ft 0 in)
- Positions: Defender; midfielder

Youth career
- VfL Lohbrügge
- Vorwärts-Wacker Billstedt
- –1978: FC St. Pauli

Senior career*
Years	Team	Apps	(Gls)
1978–1979	Hamburger SV	1	(0)
1979–1984	Hannover 96	168	(15)
1984–1991	Eintracht Braunschweig	221	(13)
1991–1996	TuS Paderborn-Neuhaus		
1996–	TuS Lingen		

International career
1977–1978	West Germany U-18	12	(0)
1979–1980	West Germany U-21	4	(0)

Managerial career
- 1991–1994: TuS Paderborn-Neuhaus (player-manager)
- 1996–: TuS Lingen (player-manager)
- FC Stukenbrock
- 1999–2005: MTV Lauenstein
- 2005–2008: SV Werl-Aspe
- 2010–2018: SV Ubbedissen 09
- * Club domestic league appearances and goals

Bernd Gorski (born 4 October 1959) is a German former football player and manager.

== Career ==
As a player, Gorski spent three seasons in the Bundesliga with Hamburger SV and Eintracht Braunschweig, as well as ten seasons in the 2. Bundesliga with Braunschweig and Hannover 96.

After retiring from professional football in 1991, he was a manager at the semi-pro and amateur level.

== Personal life ==
Gorski is the son-in-law of football manager Gerd Roggensack.

== Honours ==
Hamburger SV

- Bundesliga: 1978–79
