= Rui Palhares =

Portuguese footballer

Personal information
- Full name: Rui Manuel Lima Correia Palhares
- Date of birth: 4 November 1954 (age 71)
- Place of birth: Évora, Portugal
- Position: Midfielder

Youth career
- 1970–1974: Sporting CP

Senior career*
Years	Team	Apps	(Gls)
1974–1977	Sporting CP	15	(0)
1977–1979	Vitória Setúbal	45	(4)
1979–1980	Varzim	21	(2)
1980–1985	Boavista	137	(12)
1985–1986	Braga	9	(1)
1986–1989	Estrela Amadora	?	(?)

International career
1981–1985	Portugal	6	(0)
- * Club domestic league appearances and goals

Rui Manuel Lima Correia Palhares (born 4 November 1954) is a retired Portuguese footballer who played as a left midfielder.
