= Gerd Roggensack =

German footballer and manager (1941–2024)

Personal information
- Date of birth: 5 October 1941
- Place of birth: Güstrow, Gau Mecklenburg, Germany
- Date of death: 17 April 2024 (aged 82)
- Position: Forward

Youth career
- 1955–1962: VfJ 08 Paderborn

Senior career*
Years	Team	Apps	(Gls)
1962–1963	Borussia Dortmund	11	(2)
1963–1967	Arminia Bielefeld		
1967–1968	1. FC Kaiserslautern	32	(9)
1968–1972	Arminia Bielefeld		
1972–1976	DJK Gütersloh		
1976–1977	FC Stukenbrock		

Managerial career
- 1976–1979: FC Stukenbrock
- 1979–1984: Arminia Bielefeld (youth and assistant)
- 1984–1986: Arminia Bielefeld
- 1986–1987: Eintracht Braunschweig
- 1987–1989: SG Wattenscheid 09
- 1989–1990: 1. FC Kaiserslautern
- 1990: Preußen Münster
- 1991–1993: Fortuna Köln
- 1993–1994: SpVgg Unterhaching
- 1995: VfL Wolfsburg
- 1997: SC Verl
- 2000–2001: SpVg Beckum
- 2001: Kickers Emden
- 2002–2003: Lüner SV
- 2004–2010: FC Stukenbrock
- 2010–2011: SV Ubbedissen 09
- * Club domestic league appearances and goals

Gerd Roggensack (5 October 1941 – 17 April 2024) was a German football player and manager.

== Career ==
As a player, Roggensack spent three seasons in the Bundesliga with 1. FC Kaiserslautern and Arminia Bielefeld, and was also part of Borussia Dortmund's 1963 German championship winning team. Roggensack was among the players involved in the 1971 Bundesliga scandal, scoring the game winner for Bielefeld in a fixed match against FC Schalke 04.

After retiring as a player, Roggensack went on to manage several clubs in the Bundesliga and 2. Bundesliga.

== Personal life and death ==
Roggensack died on 17 April 2024, at the age of 82. He was the father-in-law of former Bundesliga footballer Bernd Gorski.

== Honours ==
As player

- German championship: 1963
- DFB-Pokal runner-up: 1962–63

As manager

- DFB-Pokal runner-up: 1994–95
