= Choi Yung-keun =

South Korean footballer (1923–1994)

Personal information
- Date of birth: 8 February 1923
- Place of birth: Korea, Empire of Japan
- Date of death: 20 July 1994 (aged 71)
- Place of death: Seoul, South Korea
- Position: Forward

Senior career*
Years	Team	Apps	(Gls)
- Seoul Football Club

International career
- South Korea
- * Club domestic league appearances and goals

- Choi Yung-keun
- Hangul: 최영근
- Hanja: 崔榮根
- RR: Choe Yeonggeun
- MR: Ch'oe Yŏnggŭn

Choi Yung-keun (Korean: 최영근; 8 February 1923 – 20 July 1994) was a South Korean footballer who played as a forward for the South Korea national team at the 1954 FIFA World Cup. He also played for Seoul Football Club.
