= Choi Soon-ho =

South Korean footballer (born 1962)

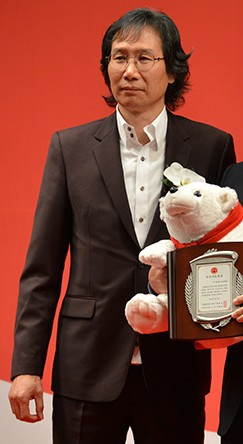
- Choi in 2015

Personal information
- Date of birth: 10 January 1962 (age 64)
- Place of birth: Cheongju, Chungbuk, South Korea
- Height: 1.85 m (6 ft 1 in)
- Positions: Striker; attacking midfielder

Youth career
- Cheongju Commercial High School

College career
Years	Team	Apps	(Gls)
1983	Kwangwoon University		

Senior career*
Years	Team	Apps	(Gls)
1980–1987	POSCO Atoms	55	(21)
1988–1990	Lucky-Goldstar Hwangso	28	(2)
1991	POSCO Atoms	16	(0)
1992–1993	Rodez	18	(2)
Total		117	(25)

International career
1979–1981	South Korea U20	10	(6)
1980–1991	South Korea	96	(30)

Managerial career
- 2000–2004: Pohang Steelers
- 2006–2008: Hyundai Mipo Dockyard
- 2009–2011: Gangwon FC
- 2016–2019: Pohang Steelers
Medal record
Representing South Korea
Men's football
Asian Games
Gold medal – first place	1986 Seoul
Bronze medal – third place	1990 Beijing
AFC Asian Cup
Runner-up	1980 Kuwait
AFC Youth Championship
Winner	1980 Thailand
- * Club domestic league appearances and goals

- Choi Soon-ho
- Hangul: 최순호
- Hanja: 崔淳鎬
- RR: Choe Sunho
- MR: Ch'oe Sunho

Choi Soon-ho (Korean: 최순호; Hanja: 崔淳鎬; born 10 January 1962) is a former South Korean football player and manager.

== International career ==
At the age of 18, Choi was named in the South Korea squad for the 1980 AFC Asian Cup, where he became the tournament's youngest ever top goalscorer with seven goals. He scored two goals when his country defeated hosts Kuwait 3–0 in the group stage, but he failed to score in their 3–0 final loss, where they met Kuwait again.

Choi participated at the 1981 FIFA World Youth Championship after leading the South Korea under-20 team to win the 1980 AFC Youth Championship title. He had two goals and two assists in a 4–1 win over Italy, but scored no goals in two losses to Romania and Brazil.

Until South Korea qualified for the 1986 FIFA World Cup, Choi contributed to more than half of their 17 goals by having one goal and eight assists in eight qualifiers. During the tournament, he assisted Park Chang-sun's goal, which is South Korea's first-ever goal at the World Cup, in a 3–1 loss to Argentina, and then scored a goal outside the penalty area in a 3–2 loss to Italy, where he also assisted Huh Jung-moo's goal.

According to several South Korean media outlets, Serie A club Juventus was interested in Choi after watching his performance against Italy at the World Youth Championship. Their interest lasted until the end of the 1986 World Cup, but his transfer faced strong opposition from his team POSCO.

== Style of play ==
Regarded as one of the most technically gifted forwards in South Korea, Choi was proficient in controlling the ball in most situations. He also had outstanding pace, field of view and physique. He played in all outfield positions thanks to his various merits during his schooldays, and settled as a striker or attacking midfielder after becoming a professional player.

== Career statistics ==
=== Club ===
Appearances and goals by club, season and competition
Club	Season	League			National cup		League cup		Total	
Club	Season	Division	Club	Goals	Apps	Goals	Apps	Goals	Apps	Goals
POSCO Atoms	1980	National Semipro League	?	?	? (Note: Appearance(s) in Korean National Championship, Korean President's Cup)	?	—		?	?
POSCO Atoms	1981	National Semipro League	?	?	?	?	—		?	?
POSCO Atoms	1982	National Semipro League	?	?	?	?	—		?	?
POSCO Atoms	1983	K League	2	2	—		—		2	2
POSCO Atoms	1984	K League	24	14	—		—		24	14
POSCO Atoms	1985	K League	5	2	—		—		5	2
POSCO Atoms	1986	K League	8	1	—		1	0	9	1
POSCO Atoms	1987	K League	16	2	—		—		16	2
POSCO Atoms	Total		55	21	?	?	1	0	56	21
Lucky-Goldstar Hwangso	1988	K League	11	1	? (Note: Appearance(s) in Korean National Championship)	?	—		11	1
Lucky-Goldstar Hwangso	1989	K League	9	0	?	?	—		9	0
Lucky-Goldstar Hwangso	1990	K League	8	1	—		—		8	1
Lucky-Goldstar Hwangso	Total		28	2	?	?	—		28	2
POSCO Atoms	1991	K League	16	0	—		—		16	0
Rodez	1992–93	French Division 2	18	2	? (Note: Appearance(s) in Coupe de France)	?	—		18	2
Career total			117	25	?	?	1	0	118	25

=== International ===
As of 17 September 2026

The Korea Football Association is showing the list of Choi's 98 international caps in its official website. It originally recognised his 96 caps, but later added two more caps against the Soviet Union Olympic and Argentina Olympic at the 1988 Summer Olympics.

The RSSSF is claiming 103 caps about Choi's international career by recognising six more caps against Malaysia B, Thailand B, Bahrain B (at the 1980 Korea Cup), NIAC Mitra (at the 1982 King's Cup), Indonesia (at the 1983 Korea Cup) and Czechoslovakia XI (at the 1988 Korea Cup), and excluding one cap against the United States (at the 1983 Korea Cup). It recognised his caps in the 1984 Summer Olympics qualifiers, but omitted his two goals against Bahrain and New Zealand at the competition.

FIFA has excluded Choi from its Century Club, which collects players with 100 or more international caps. In 1999, Choi was inducted into the AFC Century Club with 113 caps by the standard of the time.

Appearances and goals by national team and year
National team	Year	Apps	Goals
South Korea	1980	8	8
South Korea	1981	4	2
South Korea	1982	11	4
South Korea	1983	6	0
South Korea	1984	6	2
South Korea	1985	12	7
South Korea	1986	9	4
South Korea	1987	4	0
South Korea	1988	4	2
South Korea	1989	10	1
South Korea	1990	18	0
South Korea	1991	4	0
Career total		96	30

Appearances and goals by competition
Competition	Apps	Goals
Friendlies	14	2
Minor competitions	33	9
Asian Games	13	5
AFC Asian Cup	6	7
Afro-Asian Cup of Nations	1	0
Summer Olympics qualification	5	2
Summer Olympics	1	0
FIFA World Cup qualification	18	4
FIFA World Cup	5	1
Total	96	30

Results list South Korea's goal tally first.

List of international goals scored by Choi Soon-ho
No.	Date	Venue	Cap	Opponent	Score	Result	Competition
1	25 August 1980	Chuncheon, South Korea	1	Indonesia	1–0	3–0	1980 Korea Cup
2	16 September 1980	Kuwait City, Kuwait	3	Malaysia	1–0	1–1	1980 AFC Asian Cup
3	19 September 1980	Kuwait City, Kuwait	4	Qatar	2–0	2–0	1980 AFC Asian Cup
4	21 September 1980	Kuwait City, Kuwait	5	Kuwait	2–0	3–0	1980 AFC Asian Cup
5	21 September 1980	Kuwait City, Kuwait	5	Kuwait	3–0	3–0	1980 AFC Asian Cup
6	24 September 1980	Kuwait City, Kuwait	6	United Arab Emirates	1–0	4–1	1980 AFC Asian Cup
7	24 September 1980	Kuwait City, Kuwait	6	United Arab Emirates	2–0	4–1	1980 AFC Asian Cup
8	24 September 1980	Kuwait City, Kuwait	6	United Arab Emirates	3–0	4–1	1980 AFC Asian Cup
9	24 April 1981	Kuwait City, Kuwait	11	Thailand	1–0	5–1	1982 FIFA World Cup qualification
10	24 April 1981	Kuwait City, Kuwait	11	Thailand	5–1	5–1	1982 FIFA World Cup qualification
11	21 March 1982	Seoul, South Korea	16	Japan	2–0	3–0	Friendly
12	11 June 1982	Gwangyang, South Korea	20	Bahrain	3–0	3–0	1982 Korea Cup
13	21 November 1982	New Delhi, India	21	South Yemen	2–0	3–0	1982 Asian Games
14	21 November 1982	New Delhi, India	21	South Yemen	3–0	3–0	1982 Asian Games
15	19 April 1984	Singapore	31	Bahrain	1–0	1–0	1984 Summer Olympics qualification
16	22 April 1984	Singapore	32	New Zealand	2–0	2–0	1984 Summer Olympics qualification
17	6 June 1985	Daejeon, South Korea	40	Thailand	1–0	3–2	1985 Korea Cup
18	8 June 1985	Gwangju, South Korea	41	Bahrain	1–0	3–0	1985 Korea Cup
19	8 June 1985	Gwangju, South Korea	41	Bahrain	2–0	3–0	1985 Korea Cup
20	15 June 1985	Seoul, South Korea	42	Iraq	1–0	2–0	1985 Korea Cup
21	15 June 1985	Seoul, South Korea	42	Iraq	2–0	2–0	1985 Korea Cup
22	30 July 1985	Jakarta, Indonesia	44	Indonesia	2–0	4–1	1986 FIFA World Cup qualification
23	14 December 1985	Nezahualcoyotl, Mexico	47	Algeria	2–0	2–0	1985 Mexico Tournament
24	10 June 1986	Puebla, Mexico	50	Italy	1–1	2–3	1986 FIFA World Cup
25	20 September 1986	Busan, South Korea	51	India	2–0	3–0	1986 Asian Games
26	3 October 1986	Seoul, South Korea	55	Indonesia	2–0	4–0	1986 Asian Games
27	3 October 1986	Seoul, South Korea	55	Indonesia	4–0	4–0	1986 Asian Games
28	19 June 1988	Suwon, South Korea	62	Zambia	2–0	4–0	1988 Korea Cup
29	26 October 1988	Tokyo, Japan	64	Japan	1–0	1–0	Friendly
30	27 May 1989	Seoul, South Korea	67	Malaysia	1–0	3–0	1990 FIFA World Cup qualification

== Honours ==
=== Player ===
POSCO Atoms

- K League 1: 1986
- Korean National Semipro League: 1982
- Korean National Semipro League (Autumn): 1981

Lucky-Goldstar Hwangso

- K League 1: 1990
- Korean National Championship: 1988

South Korea U20

- AFC Youth Championship: 1980

South Korea

- Asian Games: 1986
- Afro-Asian Cup of Nations: 1987
- Dynasty Cup: 1990
- AFC Asian Cup runner-up: 1980

Individual

- AFC Asian Cup top goalscorer: 1980
- AFC Asian Cup Team of the Tournament: 1980
- Korean FA Best XI: 1980, 1984, 1985, 1986
- AFC Youth Championship Most Valuable Player: 1980
- AFC Youth Championship top goalscorer: 1980
- K League 1 Best XI: 1984
- Korean FA Most Valuable Player: 1990
- K League All-Star: 1991
- K League '80s All-Star Team: 2003
- K League 30th Anniversary Best XI: 2013
- K League Hall of Fame: 2023

=== Manager ===
Hyundai Mipo Dockyard

- Korea National League: 2007, 2008
- Korean President's Cup: 2008

Individual

- K League All-Star: 2004
- Korea National League Manager of the Year: 2007, 2008
- Korean President's Cup Best Manager: 2008
