= Kim Sung-nam =

South Korean footballer

Personal information
- Full name: Kim Sung-nam
- Date of birth: July 19, 1954 (age 72)
- Place of birth: South Korea
- Height: 1.70 m (5 ft 7 in)

Team information
- Current team: FC Seoul (reserve team manager)

College career
Years	Team	Apps	(Gls)
- Korea University

Senior career*
Years	Team	Apps	(Gls)
1980–1982	Sea Bee	?	(?)
1983	Yukong Elephants	9	(0)
1984–1985	Daewoo Royals	9	(1)

International career^{‡}
1976–1978	South Korea	26	(4)

Managerial career
- 1994–1996: South Korea Olympic
- 1997–1999: Korea University
- 2002–2004: Hongik University
- 2005: FC Seoul Chief Scout
- 2006–2009: FC Seoul Reserve Team
- 2010: FC Seoul Technical Director
- 2011–2012: FC Seoul Reserve Team
- * Club domestic league appearances and goals as of December 2, 2008 ‡ National team caps and goals as of December 2, 2008

Kim Sung-nam (Korean: 김성남, born on July 19, 1954) is a South Korean former professional footballer.

He was a former Yukong Elephants and Daewoo Royals. He also has famous brother footballers. His elder brothers are Kim Jung-Nam and Kim Kang-Nam.

He was appointed Chief Scouter of FC Seoul in 2005 and appointed FC Seoul reserve team manager in 2005.
