= United States men's national under-21 soccer team =

National association football team

United States Under-21
- Nickname(s): The Stars and Stripes; The Yanks
- Association: United States; Soccer Federation
- Confederation: CONCACAF
- FIFA code: USA
First colours	Second colours

The United States U-21 men's national soccer team is the national under-21 association football team of the United States.

The U.S. Under-21 Men's National Team serves as a transition for players between the Under-20 National Team and senior team as well as to provide extended preparation for the Under-23 National Team.

== Current squad ==
The following players have been called up to the squad for the friendly matches against Japan and South Korea on 27 and 31 March 2026; respectively in South Korea.

No.	Pos.	Player	Date of birth (age)	Caps	Goals	Club
	GK	Diego Kochen	19 March 2006 (age 20)	0	0	(Royal Spanish Football Federation) Barcelona
	GK	Gabriel Slonina	15 May 2004 (age 21)	0	0	(The Football Association) Chelsea
	DF	Reed Baker-Whiting	31 March 2005 (age 21)	0	0	(United States Soccer Federation) Nashville
	DF	Noah Cobb	20 July 2005 (age 20)	0	0	(United States Soccer Federation) Colorado Rapids
	DF	Tate Johnson	10 July 2005 (age 20)	0	0	(Canadian Soccer Association) Vancouver Whitecaps
	DF	Ethan Kohler	20 May 2005 (age 20)	0	0	(United States Soccer Federation) New England Revolution
	DF	Nolan Norris	17 February 2005 (age 21)	0	0	(United States Soccer Federation) Dallas
	DF	Thomas Williams	15 August 2004 (age 21)	0	0	(United States Soccer Federation) Nashville
	MF	Alan Carleton	20 March 2005 (age 21)	0	0	(Swedish Football Association) Sandviken
	MF	Santiago Castañeda	13 November 2004 (age 21)	0	0	(German Football Association) Paderborn 07
	MF	Jackson Hopkins	1 July 2004 (age 21)	0	0	(United States Soccer Federation) DC United
	MF	Brandon Powell	17 October 2005 (age 20)	0	0	(The Football Association) Barrow
	MF	Rokas Pukštas	25 August 2004 (age 21)	0	0	(Croatian Football Federation) Hajduk Split
	MF	Brooklyn Raines	11 March 2005 (age 21)	0	0	(United States Soccer Federation) New England Revolution
	MF	Niko Tsakiris	19 June 2005 (age 20)	0	0	(United States Soccer Federation) San Jose Earthquakes
	MF	Gerardo Valenzuela	28 September 2004 (age 21)	0	0	(United States Soccer Federation) Cincinnati
	FW	Luke Brennan	24 February 2005 (age 21)	0	0	(United States Soccer Federation) Atlanta United
	FW	Damion Downs	6 July 2004 (age 21)	0	0	(German Football Association) Hamburger SV
	FW	Korede Osundina	13 February 2004 (age 22)	0	0	(Portuguese Football Federation) Casa Pia
	FW	Darren Yapi	19 November 2004 (age 21)	0	0	(United States Soccer Federation) Colorado Rapids
