= Mike Bakić =

Canadian soccer player

Mike Bakic
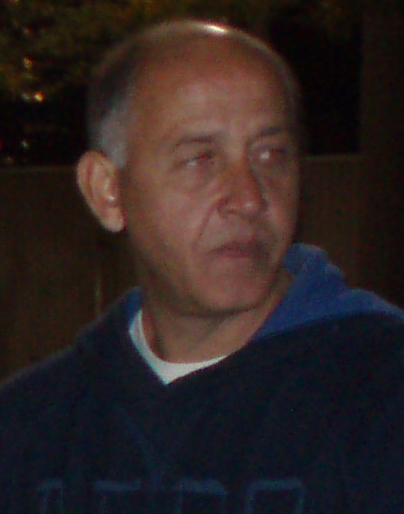
- Bakić in 2007

Personal information
- Full name: Milovan Bakić
- Date of birth: 30 December 1952 (age 73)
- Place of birth: Belgrade, FPR Yugoslavia
- Height: 1.82 m (5 ft 11 1/2 in)
- Position: Midfielder

Youth career
- 1965–1971: Partizan Belgrade

Senior career*
| Years | Team | Apps | (Gls) |
| 1972–1976 | Serbian White Eagles | | |
| 1977 | Rochester Lancers | 23 | (3) |
| 1978–1979 | Washington Diplomats | 20 | (6) |
| 1979–1980 | Hartford Hellions (indoor) | 17 | (15) |
| 1980 | Houston Hurricane | 13 | (1) |
| 1981–1982 | Kansas City Comets (indoor) | 20 | (10) |

International career
| 1977 | Canada | 4 | (2) |
- * Club domestic league appearances and goals

Milovan "Mike" Bakić (Serbian Cyrillic: Милован Мајк Бакић; born 30 December 1952) is a Canadian retired soccer player.

== Club career ==
Bakić played professional club soccer for Serbian White Eagles, Rochester Lancers, Washington Diplomats and Houston Hurricane. He also played indoor soccer for the Hartford Hellions and Kansas City Comets.

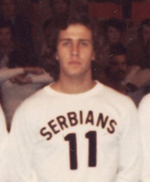
Bakić in 1973

== International career ==
Bakić represented Canada at the 1977 CONCACAF Championship, scoring two goals in four games. He was the first player of Serbian descent to play for Canada.

He debuted for Canada against Suriname on 12 October 1977, scoring a goal in a 2–1 victory in Mexico City. His last cap came against Mexico on 22 October 1977 in a 1–3 defeat in Monterrey.

=== International goals ===
Scores and results list Canada's goal tally first.

| # | Date | Venue | Opponent | Score | Result | Competition |
|---|---|---|---|---|---|---|
| 1 | 12 October 1977 | Estadio Azteca, Mexico City, Mexico | Suriname | 2–1 | 2–1 | 1978 FIFA World Cup qualification |
| 2 | 20 October 1977 | Estadio Universitario, Monterrey, Mexico | Haiti | 1–1 | 1–1 | 1978 FIFA World Cup qualification |
