= Mike Lester (footballer) =

English footballer

Personal information
- Full name: Michael John Anthony Lester
- Date of birth: 4 August 1954 (age 72)
- Place of birth: Manchester, England
- Height: 5 ft 10 in (1.78 m)
- Position: Midfielder

Senior career*
Years	Team	Apps	(Gls)
1972–1974	Oldham Athletic	27	(2)
1974–1977	Manchester City	2	(0)
1975–1976	→ Stockport County (loan)	9	(1)
1977	Washington Diplomats	24	(1)
1977–1979	Grimsby Town	48	(10)
1979–1981	Barnsley	64	(11)
1981–1982	Exeter City	19	(6)
1982–1983	Bradford City	49	(2)
1983–1986	Scunthorpe United	106	(9)
1985–1986	→ Hartlepool United (loan)	11	(1)
1986–1987	Stockport County	11	(0)
1987	Ludvika FK		
1987–1988	Blackpool	11	(1)
1988–1990	Chorley		
Total		381	(44)
- * Club domestic league appearances and goals

Michael John Anthony Lester (born 4 August 1954) is an English former professional footballer who played as a defender/midfielder. He made 381 appearances most at Scunthorpe from 1983 to 1986 with 106 appearances.

Lester played in the North American Soccer League with the Washington Diplomats, and was involved in an altercation with Pelé during his last appearance for the New York Cosmos in Washington.

He signed for Mossley in December 1989 and retired at the end of the season having made 24 appearances.

Later became assistant manager of Runcorn and then manager of Chadderton, Atherton Laburnum Rovers, Rochdale Town and Oldham Borough.
