= Hallvar Thoresen =

Norwegian footballer and manager (born 1957)

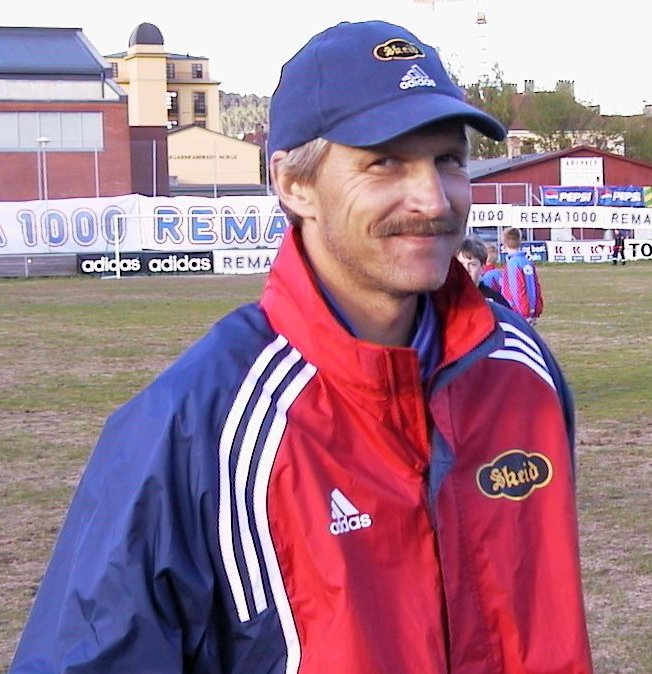
- Thoresen as manager of Skeid Fotball in 2001

Personal information
- Full name: Hallvar Thoresen
- Date of birth: 12 April 1957 (age 69)
- Place of birth: Larvik, Norway
- Position: Attacking midfielder

Youth career
- 1971?–1976: Larvik Turn

Senior career*
Years	Team	Apps	(Gls)
1976–1981	FC Twente	135	(46)
1981–1988	PSV Eindhoven	179	(106)
1988–1991	Frigg	6	(0)
Total		320	(152)

International career
1978–1987	Norway	50	(9)

Managerial career
- 1992: Strømsgodset IF
- 1993–1995: SK Brann
- 1997: Odd Grenland B.K.
- 1998–2000: Lillestrøm SK
- 2000–2002: Skeid Fotball
- 2003–2006: Norway U21
- 2007–2015: FC Twente, scout
- 2016–2020: Rosenborg BK, chief scout
- * Club domestic league appearances and goals

Hallvar Thoresen (born 12 April 1957) is a former Norwegian footballer who played most of his career in the Dutch Eredivisie as an attacking midfielder. The son of former Norwegian international Gunnar Thoresen, Hallvar Thoresen was central in 1980s Norwegian football.

== Career ==
=== Club ===
Thoresen started his career in Larvik Turn, but travelled abroad at the age of nineteen, and soon became a regular at FC Twente in the Netherlands. They won the Dutch Cup in 1977 and Thoreson was the club top-scorer in the 1979–80 and 1980–81 seasons. In the summer of 1981 he was sold to PSV Eindhoven for 1.3 million Dutch guilder where he formed a dynamic partnership with Jurrie Koolhof. Helping capturing three league titles, Thoresen was a key player for seven years, serving as captain from 1983 to 1986, until he returned to Norway and played for Frigg in the lower divisions. Troubled by an injury, he was forced to retire from his playing career shortly thereafter. With 152 goals Thoresen is the all-time leading foreign goalscorer in the Eredivisie.

=== International ===
He played 50 matches for the Norway national football team, and scored 9 goals, one of which secured the historic victory over England in 1981. Thoresen is among the six Norwegian internationals who have never played in the Norwegian Premier League.

=== Managerial ===
He did assume the coaching position at Frigg, later moving on to coach larger clubs like Brann, Strømsgodset, Hønefoss, Skeid, and Lillestrøm (assistant). He is currently in charge of the Norway U21. Odd Grenland announced on 30 October 2006 that Thoresen had agreed to take over as the club's Director of Football. Thoresen was the chief scout for Rosenborg BK from 2016 until 2019.

He is a supporter of Arsenal, to the point where he opened a pub in Oslo, Norway called Highbury.

=== Acting ===
Thoresen played the role of Norwegian football player and Allied POW Gunnar Hilsson in the movie Escape to Victory (1981).
