= Jurrie Koolhof =

Dutch footballer and manager (1960–2019)

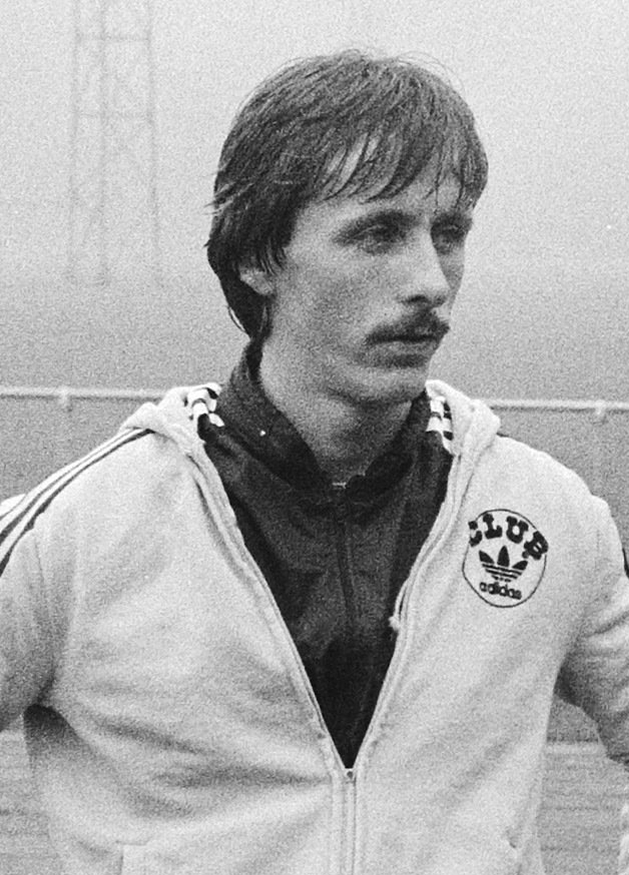
- Jurrie Koolhof in 1983

Personal information
- Full name: Jurjen Jacob Koolhof
- Date of birth: 10 January 1960
- Place of birth: Beerta, Netherlands
- Date of death: 28 January 2019 (aged 59)
- Place of death: Duiven, Netherlands
- Height: 1.80 m (5 ft 11 in)
- Position: Striker

Youth career
- THOS
- 1977–1978: SC Veendam

Senior career*
Years	Team	Apps	(Gls)
1978–1980	BV Veendam	61	(26)
1980–1982	Vitesse Arnhem	51	(31)
1982–1987	PSV Eindhoven	106	(69)
1987–1988	FC Groningen	20	(10)
1988–1990	Vitesse Arnhem	65	(15)
1990–1993	De Graafschap	85	(32)
1993–1994	BV Veendam	28	(7)
1994	De Graafschap	1	(0)
Total		417	(190)

International career
1982–1983	Netherlands	5	(0)

Managerial career
- 2000–2002: De Graafschap
- 2002–2003: FC Emmen (as assistant manager)
- 2003–2005: AGOVV Apeldoorn
- 2005–2006: FC Dordrecht
- 2006–2007: MVV Maastricht
- 2007–2008: SC Cambuur-Leeuwarden
- * Club domestic league appearances and goals

Jurjen Jacob "Jurrie" Koolhof (10 January 1960 – 28 January 2019) was a Dutch international football striker and manager.

As a player, Koolhof had a long and productive career, with 190 league goals. He played for a number of clubs in the Netherlands including Vitesse Arnhem, F.C. Groningen, De Graafschap and PSV Eindhoven. For the latter he scored a total of 69 goals in 106 appearances and had an effective partnership with Norway's Hallvar Thoresen in the mid-1980s.

== Club career ==
He began his career at the local pride BV Veendam, breaking into the first-team squad in 1978. He began scoring prolifically in the late 1980s, thus attracting attention. He was transferred to Vitesse Arnhem in 1980, the same year they were relegated from the Eredivisie (first) to the Erste (second) Divisie. In his second season in Arnhem he managed to score 19 goals in 16 appearances, an exceptional average of 1.2 goals per match. During the 1981/82 transfer window he signed a contract at PSV Eindhoven, his first Eredivisie club.

His first years in the lichtstad (city of light) were successful. He adapted quickly to the top-tier professional level and, over two and a half years, missed few matches. However, in 1984 he suffered an injury that left him unable to play for two full years. In the 1986/87 season he returned to the pitch, although he never fully recovered. He played professional football for another seven years, mainly in the Eerste Divisie. After continuing to play on FC Groningen, Vitesse Arnhem and De Graafschap he ended his career where it had once started, with BV Veendam.

== National team career ==
He first played for the Netherlands on 14 August 1982 against Greece. After the 46 minute mark he replaced Piet Wildschut. At the time there were not any goals scored, but a goal by Edo Ophof in 54th minute would cause Oranje to win the game.

He was capped only 5 times, scoring zero goals. As a result, he did not enjoy a long international career. He played his last international match on 16 February 1983, just over 9 months after his first international appearance. This last match was the Euro 1984 qualifier against Spain, resulting in a 1–0 loss.

== Coaching career ==
After he quit playing Doetinchem became his new domicile. He acted alternately as head of the youth academy and manager of De Graafschap from 1994 to 2002. He was Hennie Spijkerman's assistant for one season at FC Emmen. In the following years he was employed at AGOVV Apeldoorn, FC Dordrecht and MVV as manager. Koolhof was fired from his job on 19 February 2007 due to disappointing results, strikingly on the same day Cambuur Leeuwarden let go their trainer Roy Wesseling. On 15 March the 47-year-old Koolhof signed a two-year contract at SC Cambuur-Leeuwarden, taking effect 1 July 2007. Gerrie Schouwenaar, who acted as interim manager, departed for Qatar. His spot was taken by Alfons Arts, who became Koolhof's assistant manager as well as a youth trainer. In his first year his team surprised everyone by defeating AZ Alkmaar in the Cup (1–0). After a few matches in the 2008–2009 season, Koolhof was sacked following a poor overall start to the season.

== Personal life ==
Koolhof was married and had two sons, footballer Dean Koolhof and tennis player Wesley Koolhof. He died after a long illness at the age of 59.

== Statistics ==
=== Player ===
Season	Club	Matches	Goals	League
1978/79	BV Veendam	33	9	Eerste Divisie
1979/80	BV Veendam	28	17	Eerste Divisie
1980/81	Vitesse Arnhem	35	12	Eerste Divisie
1981/82	Vitesse Arnhem	16	19	Eerste Divisie
1981/82	PSV	13	7	Eredivisie
1982/83	PSV	33	22	Eredivisie
1983/84	PSV	31	23	Eredivisie
1984/85	PSV	0	0	Eredivisie
1985/86	PSV	0	0	Eredivisie
1986/87	PSV	29	17	Eredivisie
1987/88	FC Groningen	20	10	Eredivisie
1988/89	Vitesse Arnhem	32	13	Eerste Divisie
1989/90	Vitesse Arnhem	33	2	Eredivisie
1990/91	De Graafschap	37	20	Eerste Divisie
1991/92	De Graafschap	31	9	Eredivisie
1992/93	De Graafschap	17	3	Eerste Divisie
1993/94	BV Veendam	28	7	Eerste Divisie
1994/95	De Graafschap	1	0	Eerste Divisie
Total		417	190	
		190	90	Eredivisie
		227	100	Eerste Divisie

=== Manager ===
Period	Club	Function	League
1994–1995	De Graafschap	Head youth academy	Eerste Divisie
1995–1999	De Graafschap	Head youth academy	Eredivisie
1999–2000	De Graafschap	Assistant manager	Eredivisie
2000	De Graafschap	Interim manager	Eredivisie
2000–2001	De Graafschap	Head youth academy	Eredivisie
2001–2002	De Graafschap	Manager	Eredivisie
2002–2003	FC Emmen	Assistant manager	Eerste Divisie
2003–2005	AGOVV	Manager	Eerste Divisie
2005–2006	FC Dordrecht	Manager	Eerste Divisie
2006–2007	MVV	Manager	Eerste Divisie
2007–2008	Cambuur Leeuwarden	Manager	Eerste Divisie

== Honours ==
With PSV

- Eredivisie (Dutch league) : 1985/1986, 1986/1987

With Vitesse Arnhem

- Eerste Divisie (Dutch first division) : 1988/1989

With De Graafschap

- Eerste Divisie (Dutch first division) : 1990/1991

== See also ==
- KNVB Cup 2007-08
- Eerste Divisie 2007-08
