= Kim Kang-nam =

South Korean footballer (born 1954)

Kim Kang-Nam
Personal information
- Full name: Kim Kang-Nam
- Date of birth: July 19, 1954 (age 72)
- Place of birth: South Korea
- Height: 1.72 m (5 ft 8 in)

Team information
- Current team: Seoul United

College career
Years	Team	Apps	(Gls)
- Korea University

Senior career*
Years	Team	Apps	(Gls)
?	Korea Electric Power FC (Semi-professional)	?	(?)
?	Navy FC (Military service)	?	(?)
1980–1982	Sea Bee	?	(?)
1983	Yukong Elephants	13	(1)
1984–1985	Daewoo Royals	3	(0)

International career^{‡}
1975–1983	South Korea	39	(6)

Managerial career
- ?: Kyungshin High School
- ?: Joongkyung High School
- 2005: Seoul United
- * Club domestic league appearances and goals as of December 2, 2008 ‡ National team caps and goals as of December 2, 2008

Kim Kang-Nam (Korean: 김강남, born July 19, 1954) is a South Korean former professional footballer.

His former clubs include Yukong Elephants and Daewoo Royals. His brothers were also footballers; twin brother Kim Sung-Nam and elder brother Kim Jung-Nam.
