= Lee Kang-jo =

South Korean football manager (born 1954)

Personal information
- Date of birth: October 27, 1954 (age 72)
- Place of birth: South Korea
- Position: Midfielder

Youth career
- Korea University

Senior career*
Years	Team	Apps	(Gls)
1983–1985	Yukong Elephants	50	(7)

International career^{‡}
1976–1984	South Korea	38	(7)

Managerial career
- 1985–1986: Yukong Elephants (Trainer)
- 1987–1989: Gangneung Jeil High School
- 1990–2002: Sangmu FC
- 2003–2010: Gwangju Sangmu FC
Medal record
Asian Games
Gold medal – first place	1978 Bangkok	Team
- * Club domestic league appearances and goals as of 15 November 2007 ‡ National team caps and goals as of 15 November 2007

- Lee Kang-jo
- Hangul: 이강조
- Hanja: 李康助
- RR: I Gangjo
- MR: I Kangjo

Lee Kang-jo (Korean: 이강조; Hanja: 李康助; born October 27, 1954) is a South Korean football manager.

== Club career statistics ==
All-Time Club Performance
Club	Season	League			League Cup			AFC Champions League			Total
Club	Season	Apps	Goals	Assts	Apps	Goals	Assts	Apps	Goals	Assts	Apps	Goals	Assts
Yukong Elephants	1983	16	2	3	-	-	-	-	-	-	16	2	3
Yukong Elephants	1984	27	4	5	-	-	-	-	-	-	27	4	5
Yukong Elephants	1985	7	1	3	-	-	-	-	-	-	7	1	3
Yukong Elephants	Total	50	7	11	-	-	-	-	-	-	50	7	11
Career totals		50	7	11	-	-	-	-	-	-	50	7	11

== Coach & manager career ==
- 1985–1986: Yukong Elephants Trainer
- 1987–1989: Gangneung Jeil High School Manager
- 1990–2002: Sangmu FC Manager
- 2003–present: Gwangju Sangmu FC Manager

== International goals ==
Results list South Korea's goal tally first.

Date	Venue	Opponent	Score	Result	Competition
December 27, 1978	Manila	Philippines	1 goal	5-0	1980 AFC Asian Cup qualification
August 25, 1980	Chuncheon	Indonesia	1 goal	3-0	1980 President's Cup
August 29, 1980	Gwangju	Bahrain	1 goal	5-0	1980 President's Cup
September 2, 1980	Seoul	Indonesia	1 goal	2-0	1980 President's Cup
April 21, 1981	Kuwait City	Malaysia	1 goal	2-1	1982 FIFA World Cup qualification
March 21, 1982	Seoul	Japan	1 goal	3-0	Korea-Japan Annual Match
May 10, 1982	Bangkok	Indonesia	1 goal	2-0	1982 King's Cup
