= Daegu Civic Stadium =

1948–2017 stadium in Daegu, South Korea

Daegu Civic Stadium 대구시민운동장 주경기장
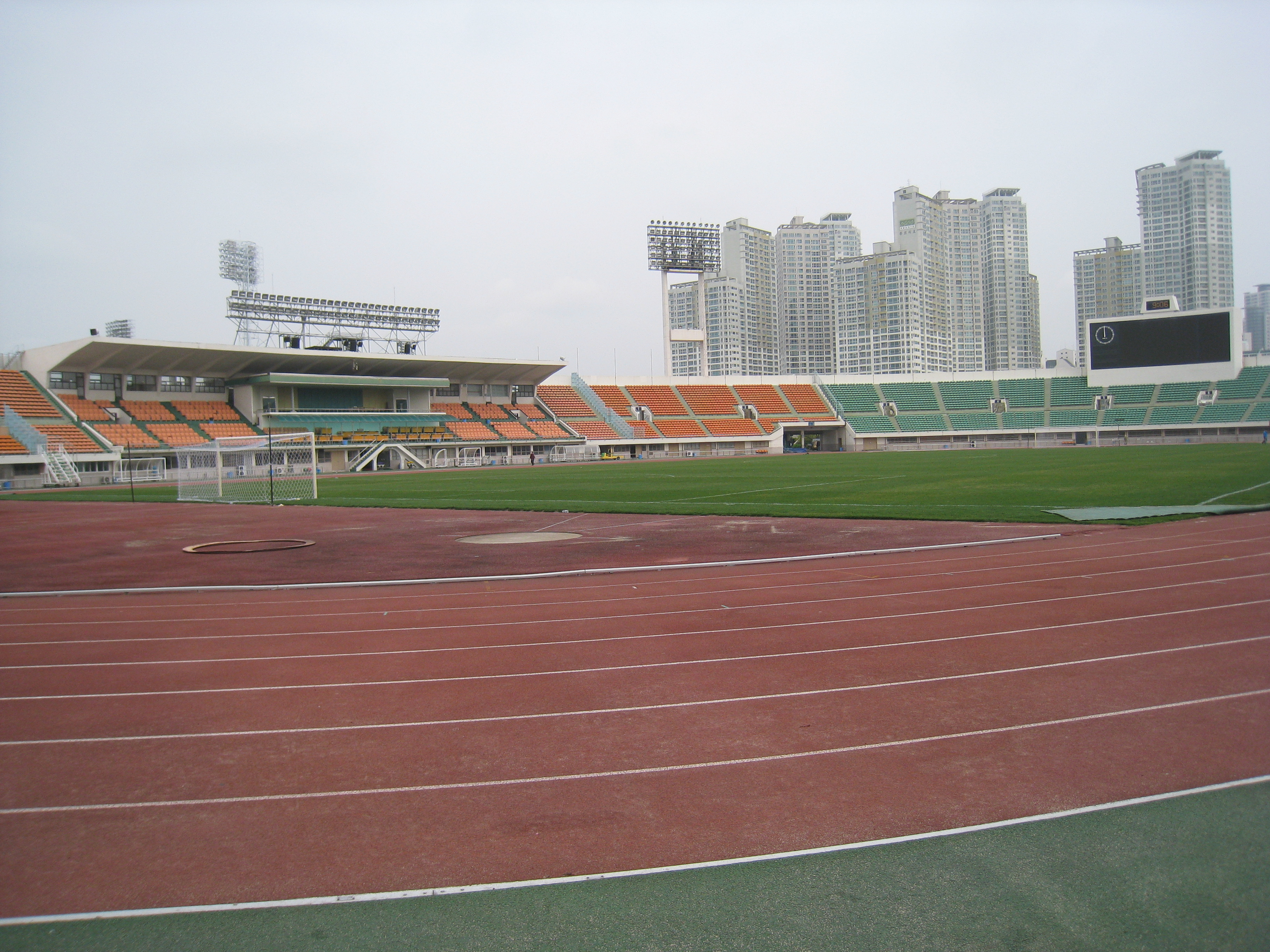
- Interactive map of Daegu Civic Stadium 대구시민운동장 주경기장
- Location: Buk District, Daegu, South Korea
- Coordinates: 35°52′53″N 128°35′18″E
- Owner: Daegu Metropolitan City Hall
- Operator: Daegu Metropolitan City Athletic Facilities Management
- Capacity: 19,467
- Surface: Grass, Tartan track
- Field size: 111 × 72 m (running track: 400 m x 8 lanes)

Construction
- Opened: 20 April 1948
- Renovated: 8 September 2003
- Expanded: August 1960
- Closed: 2017
- Demolished: 2017

Tenant
- (former main stadium) POSCO Atoms (1987) (former main stadium) Daegu FC (2003–2019) (secondary field) (DGB Daegu Bank Park) Daegu FC (2019-)

- Daegu Civic Stadium
- Hangul: 대구시민운동장
- Hanja: 大邱市民運動場
- RR: Daegu simin undongjang
- MR: Taegu simin undongjang

The Daegu Civic Stadium (Korean: 대구시민운동장) was a stadium in Daegu sports complex in Daegu, South Korea. The former main stadium was used mostly for football matches of Daegu FC. During the 1986 Asian Games and 1988 Summer Olympics, it hosted some football matches. The stadium had a capacity of 30,000 (19,467 seats) and opened on 20 April 1948. The stadium was expanded and reconstructed in 1975, and was renovated and repaired on 8 September 2003. The main stadium of the complex was demolished in 2017, and the new DGB Daegu Bank Park was built at the same place.

The complex is called "Daegu Complex Sports Town". It now has DGB Daegu Bank Park, indoor gym, small soccer field, and Daegu Baseball Stadium, which was a former home of Samsung Lions.
