= Hwang Seok-keun =

South Korean footballer (born 1960)

Hwan Seok-keun
Personal information
- Full name: 3 September 1960 (age 66)
- Place of birth: South Korea
- Position: Forward

Youth career
- 1980–1982: Korea University

Senior career*
| Years | Team | Apps | (Gls) |
| 1983 | Yukong Elephants | 2 | (0) |
| 1984–1986 | Hanil Bank | 56 | (8) |

International career
| 1979 | South Korea U-20 | | |
| 1980–1981 | South Korea | 18 | (9) |
- * Club domestic league appearances and goals

- Hwang Seok-keun
- Hangul: 황석근
- Hanja: 黃石根
- RR: Hwang Seokgeun
- MR: Hwang Sŏkkŭn

Hwang Seok-keun (Korean: 황석근; born September 3, 1960) is a Korean former football forward who played for South Korea in the 1980 Asian Cup. He also played for Korea University.

== International record ==
| Year | Apps | Goal |
|---|---|---|
| 1980 | 5 | 3 |
| 1981 | 7 | 5 |
| 1982 | 6 | 1 |
| Total | 18 | 9 |
