= Lee Tae-ho =

South Korean footballer (born 1961)

Personal information
- Date of birth: 29 January 1961 (age 65)
- Place of birth: Daejeon, South Korea
- Height: 1.72 m (5 ft 8 in)
- Position: Forward

College career
Years	Team	Apps	(Gls)
1980–1982	Korea University		

Senior career*
Years	Team	Apps	(Gls)
1983–1992	Daewoo Royals	170	(53)

International career
1978–1979	South Korea U20		
1979–1989	South Korea B		
1980–1991	South Korea	80	(24)

Managerial career
- 1995–1998: Dong-Eui University
- 2001–2002: Daejeon Citizen
- 2007–2011: Dong-Eui University
- 2011: Manang Marshyangdi Club
- 2011–2012: Chinese Taipei
- 2014–2015: Busan Kappa (futsal)
- 2015–: Gangdong University
Medal record
Representing South Korea
Men's football
Asian Games
Gold medal – first place	1986 Seoul
AFC Asian Cup
Runner-up	1980 Kuwait
Runner-up	1988 Qatar
AFC Youth Championship
Winner	1978 Bangladesh
- * Club domestic league appearances and goals

- Lee Tae-ho
- Hangul: 이태호
- Hanja: 李泰昊
- RR: I Taeho
- MR: I T'aeho

Lee Tae-ho (Korean: 이태호; Hanja: 李泰昊; Korean pronunciation: [i.tʰɛ̝.ɦo]; born January 29, 1961) is a South Korean former professional footballer who played as a forward. He spent his entire career playing for the Daewoo Royals. In the history of the FIFA World Cup, he was the first player to be blind in one eye.

== International career ==
Before starting his professional career, he was the first South Korean to score at the FIFA World Youth Championship. His goal came against Canada at the 1979 tournament. Afterwards, he was called the "Korean Gerd Müller" for his scoring ability. He contributed to South Korea's gold medal at the 1986 Asian Games. During a K League match against POSCO Atoms in 1987, his right eye was impaired after being injured by Nam Ki-young's foot. However, his blindness was not enough to stop his performance. He became the top goalscorer at the 1988 AFC Asian Cup and participated at the 1990 FIFA World Cup.

== Career statistics ==
=== International ===
Results list South Korea's goal tally first.

No.	Date	Venue	Opponent	Score	Result	Competition
1	24 April 1981	Kuwait City, Kuwait	Thailand	4–1	5–1	1982 FIFA World Cup qualification
2	1 March 1982	Calcutta, India	China	1–0	1–1	1982 Nehru Cup
3	10 March 1982	Baghdad, Iraq	Iraq	?–?	1–1	Friendly
4	9 May 1982	Bangkok, Thailand	Thailand	3–0	3–0	1982 King's Cup
5	11 June 1982	Gwangju, South Korea	Bahrain	1–0	3–0	1982 Korea Cup
6	11 June 1982	Gwangju, South Korea	Bahrain	2–0	3–0	1982 Korea Cup
7	6 June 1983	Suwon, South Korea	Thailand	3–0	4–0	1983 Korea Cup
8	15 June 1983	Seoul, South Korea	Ghana	1–0	1–0	1983 Korea Cup
9	3 June 1984	Busan, South Korea	Guatemala	1–0	2–0	1984 Korea Cup
10	13 October 1984	Calcutta, India	Pakistan	1–0	6–0	1984 AFC Asian Cup qualification
11	2 December 1984	Singapore	Saudi Arabia	1–0	1–1	1984 AFC Asian Cup
12	2 March 1985	Kathmandu, Nepal	Nepal	2–0	2–0	1986 FIFA World Cup qualification
13	6 June 1985	Daejeon, South Korea	Thailand	3–1	3–2	1985 Korea Cup
14	8 June 1985	Gwangju, South Korea	Bahrain	3–0	3–0	1985 Korea Cup
15	26 October 1985	Tokyo, Japan	Japan	2–0	2–1	1986 FIFA World Cup qualification
16	28 September 1986	Seoul, South Korea	China	3–1	4–2	1986 Asian Games
17	3 October 1986	Seoul, South Korea	Indonesia	3–0	4–0	1986 Asian Games
18	6 January 1988	Doha, Qatar	Egypt	1–0	1–1 (a.e.t.) (5–4 p)	1988 Afro-Asian Cup of Nations
19	3 December 1988	Doha, Qatar	United Arab Emirates	1–0	1–0	1988 AFC Asian Cup
20	14 December 1988	Doha, Qatar	China	1–0	2–1 (a.e.t.)	1988 AFC Asian Cup
21	14 December 1988	Doha, Qatar	China	2–1	2–1 (a.e.t.)	1988 AFC Asian Cup
22	5 May 1989	Seoul, South Korea	Japan	1–0	1–0	Friendly
23	25 May 1989	Seoul, South Korea	Nepal	2–0	9–0	1990 FIFA World Cup qualification
24	3 June 1989	Singapore	Nepal	4–0	4–0	1990 FIFA World Cup qualification

== Honours ==
=== Player ===
Korea University

- Korean National Championship runner-up: 1981
- Korean President's Cup: 1982

Daewoo Royals

- K League 1: 1984, 1987, 1991
- Korean National Championship: 1989
- Korean League Cup runner-up: 1986

South Korea U20

- AFC Youth Championship: 1978

South Korea

- Asian Games: 1986
- AFC Asian Cup runner-up: 1980, 1988
- Afro-Asian Cup of Nations: 1987

Individual

- Korean FA Best XI: 1981, 1984, 1987, 1988
- K League 1 Best XI: 1984, 1990
- AFC Asian All-Star: 1985
- AFC Asian Cup top goalscorer: 1988
- AFC Asian Cup Best Forward: 1988
- Korean National Championship Best Player: 1989
- Korean National Championship top goalscorer: 1989

=== Manager ===
Daejeon Citizen

- Korean FA Cup: 2001
