= List of foreign K League 1 players =

This is a list of foreign players in K League 1.

- Players in **bold** are currently playing in K League 1.
- If players have been capped for a national team, this nationality takes precedence over the nationality stated in the official K League player registration database.
- In dual citizen annotation, if dual citizen players have an international career, the country listed in italics is the national team they have played for.

== Africa (CAF) ==
=== Cameroon ===
- Gustave Bollanga Priso (1996 Jeonbuk Hyundai Dinos)
- Bertin Tomou (1997 Pohang Steelers)
- Gilbert Massock (1997 Anyang LG Cheetahs)
- Michel Pensée (1997–1999 Ilhwa Chunma)
- Claude Ngon A Djam (1999 Ilhwa Chunma)
- Nicolas Mbianda (2000 Jeonbuk Hyundai Motors)
- Same Nkwelle (2002 Daejeon Citizen)
- Felix Nzeina (2005 Busan IPark)
- Émile Mbamba (2009 Daegu FC)
- **Blaise Tsague** (2026–present FC Anyang)

=== Cote d'Ivoire ===
- Jean-Marc Benie (2000 Seongnam Ilhwa Chunma)
- Loukou Auguste (2000 Seongnam Ilhwa Chunma)
- **Adriel Ba Loua** (2026–present Gwangju FC)

=== DR Congo ===
- Emeka Mamale (1996–1997 Pohang Steelers)
- Jean-Kasongo Banza (1997 Jeonnam Dragons, 1997 Ilhwa Chunma)
- Zazi Chaminga (1997 Ilhwa Chunma)
- Mutamba Kabongo (1997–2000 LG Cheetahs)
- N'Dayi Kalenga (1999 Ilhwa Chunma)
- Paul-José M'Poku (2023–2024 Incheon United) ※ **Dual citizen** of DR Congo and Belgium

=== Egypt ===
- Mohamed Azima (1996 Hyundai Horang-i)

=== Gambia ===
- Modou Barrow (2020–2022 Jeonbuk Hyundai Motors); also played in K League 2 ※ **Dual citizen** of Gambia and Sweden (Note: Modou Barrow's listed country in the K League player registration is Sweden.)

=== Ghana ===
- George Alhassan (1984 Hyundai Horang-i)
- Stanley Aborah (1997–1998 Ilhwa Chunma)
- Patrick Villars (2003 Bucheon SK)
- Alex Asamoah (2010 Gyeongnam FC)
- Derek Asamoah (2011–2012 Pohang Steelers, 2013 Daegu FC) ※ **Dual citizen** of Ghana and the United Kingdom (Note: Derek Asamoah's listed country in the K League player registration is the United Kingdom.)
- Maxwell Acosty (2023 Suwon Samsung Bluewings); also played in K League 2 ※ **Dual citizen** of Ghana and Italy
- Nana Boateng (2023–2025 Jeonbuk Hyundai Motors)
- **Patrick Twumasi** (2025–present Jeonbuk Hyundai Motors)

=== Guinea ===
- Abdoul Salam Sow (1996 Jeonnam Dragons)

=== Guinea-Bissau ===
- Frédéric Mendy (2016 Ulsan Hyundai, 2017 Jeju United) ※ **Dual citizen** of Guinea-Bissau and France (Note: Frédéric Mendy's listed country in the K League player registration is France.)
- **Gerso Fernandes** (2021–2022 Jeju United, 2023–2024 & 2026–present Incheon United); also played in K League 2 ※ **Dual citizen** of Guinea-Bissau and Portugal
- Romário Baldé (2025 Gangwon FC) ※ **Dual citizen** of Guinea-Bissau and Portugal

=== Mali ===
- Cheick Tidiani Dao (2002 Bucheon SK)
- Cheick Oumar Dabo (2002–2004 Bucheon SK)

=== Mauritius ===
- Giovanni Jeannot (1996–1997 Hyundai Horang-i)

=== Niger ===
- Olivier Bonnes (2016–2017 Gwangju FC); also played in K League 2 ※ **Dual citizen** of Niger and France (Note: Olivier Bonnes's listed country in the K League player registration is France.)

=== Nigeria ===
- Alex Agbo (1997 Ilhwa Chunma)
- Ajibade Babalade (1997 Anyang LG Cheetahs)
- Victor Shaka (1997–1999 Anyang LG Cheetahs, 1999–2000 Ulsan Hyundai Horang-i, 2001–2002 Busan I'Cons)
- John Zaki (2000 Jeonbuk Hyundai Motors)
- Lucky Isibor (2000 Suwon Samsung Bluewings)
- Obinna Nkedoi (2002 Daejeon Citizen)
- Augustine James (2003 Bucheon SK)
- Eric Obinna Chukwunyelu (2008 Daejeon Citizen) ※ **Dual citizen** of Nigeria and France
- Lanre Kehinde (2019–2020 Incheon United)
- Christian Osaguona (2019 Jeju United)
- Moses Ogbu (2022 Pohang Steelers) ※ **Dual citizen** of Nigeria and Sweden
- **Jesse Sekidika** (2026–present Gangwon FC)

=== Rwanda ===
- York Rafael (2026 FC Anyang) ※ **Dual citizen** of Rwanda and Sweden

=== Senegal ===
- Papa Oumar Coly (2001–2003 Daejeon Citizen)

=== Sierra Leone ===
- Mahmadu Alphajor Bah (1997–1998 Jeonnam Dragons)

=== South Africa ===
- Lars Veldwijk (2020 Jeonbuk Hyundai Motors, 2021–2023 Suwon FC); also played in K League 2 ※ **Dual citizen** of South Africa and the Netherlands (Note: Lars Veldwijk's listed country in the K League player registration is the Netherlands.)

=== Togo ===
- Peniel Mlapa (2024 Daejeon Hana Citizen); also played in K League 2 ※ **Dual citizen** of Togo and Germany

== Asia (AFC) ==
=== Australia ===
- Greg Brown (1991 POSCO Atoms) ※ **Dual citizen** of Australia and New Zealand
- Ahmad Elrich (2004 Busan I'Cons)
- Antun Kovacic (2009 Ulsan Hyundai)
- Jade North (2009 Incheon United)
- Saša Ognenovski (2009–2012 Seongnam Ilhwa Chunma)
- Iain Fyfe (2011 Busan IPark)
- Luke DeVere (2011–2014 Gyeongnam FC)
- Robert Cornthwaite (2011–2014 Jeonnam Dragons)
- Matt McKay (2012 Busan IPark)
- Eddy Bosnar (2012–2013 Suwon Samsung Bluewings)
- Nathan Burns (2012–2013 Incheon United)
- Matt Simon (2012–2013 Jeonnam Dragons)
- Brendan Hamill (2012–2014 Seongnam Ilhwa Chunma, 2013 Gangwon FC)
- Adrian Madaschi (2012–2013 Jeju United)
- Alex Wilkinson (2012–2015 Jeonbuk Hyundai Motors)
- Aleksandar Jovanovic (2014–2015 & 2017–2019 Jeju United); also played in K League 2
- Adrian Leijer (2016 Suwon FC); also played in K League 2
- Erik Paartalu (2016 Jeonbuk Hyundai Motors)
- Tomislav Mrcela (2016–2018 Jeonnam Dragons) ※ **Dual citizen** of Australia and Croatia
- Bruce Djite (2016 Suwon FC); also played in K League 2
- Matthew Jurman (2017–2018 Suwon Samsung Bluewings)
- Connor Chapman (2017 Incheon United, 2018 Pohang Steelers, 2021 FC Seoul); also played in K League 2
- Dimitri Petratos (2017 Ulsan Hyundai)
- Ivan Franjic (2017 Daegu FC)
- Dylan McGowan (2018 Gangwon FC)
- Kwabena Appiah (2018 Incheon United) ※ **Dual citizen** of Australia and New Zealand
- James Donachie (2018 Jeonnam Dragons)
- Bernie Ibini-Isei (2019 Jeonbuk Hyundai Motors)
- Adam Taggart (2019–2020 Suwon Samsung Bluewings)
- Rashid Mahazi (2019–2020 Incheon United) ※ **Dual citizen** of Australia and Kenya
- Jason Davidson (2019–2021 Ulsan Hyundai)
- Terry Antonis (2019–2021 Suwon Samsung Bluewings)
- Brandon O'Neill (2020 Pohang Steelers)
- Alex Grant (2021–2023 Pohang Steelers)
- Harrison Delbridge (2021–2024 Incheon United); also played in K League 2
- Lachlan Jackson (2021–2024 Suwon FC)
- Ben Halloran (2022 FC Seoul)
- Aaron Calver (2023 Gwangju FC, 2024–2025 Daejeon Hana Citizen); also played in K League 2
- Jonathan Aspropotamitis (2024–2025 Pohang Steelers)
- Alexandar Popovic (2024 Gwangju FC)
- Henry Hore (2024 Gangwon FC)
- Joel Anasmo (2025 Jeonbuk Hyundai Motors) ※ **Dual citizen** of Australia and South Sudan
- **John Iredale** (2026–present Gwangju FC); also played in K League 2

=== China ===
- Wan Houliang (2009 Jeonbuk Hyundai Motors)
- Feng Xiaoting (2009 Daegu FC, 2010 Jeonbuk Hyundai Motors)
- Li Weifeng (2009–2010 Suwon Samsung Bluewings)
- Li Chunyu (2010 Gangwon FC)
- Yan Song (2010 Jeju United)
- Bai Zijian (2011 Daejeon Citizen)
- Huang Bowen (2011–2012 Jeonbuk Hyundai Motors)

=== East Timor ===
- Rodrigo Silva (2017 Daegu FC); when Rodrigo was registered in K League, he was a dual citizen of East Timor and Brazil. He was declared ineligible to participate for the representative teams of the East Timor Football Federation.

=== Indonesia ===
- Pratama Arhan (2024 Suwon FC)

=== Iran ===
- Khaled Shafiei (2017 FC Seoul)

=== Iraq ===
- Abbas Obeid (1996–1997 Anyang LG Cheetahs, 1997–2001 Pohang Steelers)
- Sadiq Saadoun (1996 Anyang LG Cheetahs)
- Ali Abbas (2016–2017 Pohang Steelers) ※ **Dual citizen** of Iraq and Australia (Note: Ali Abbas's listed country in the K League player registration is Australia.)
- Jiloan Hamad (2019 Incheon United) ※ **Dual citizen** of Iraq and Sweden (Note: Jiloan Hamad's listed country in the K League player registration is Sweden.)
- Rebin Sulaka (2024 FC Seoul)

=== Japan ===
- Kojiro Kaimoto (2001–2002 Seongnam Ilhwa Chunma)
- Masakiyo Maezono (2003 Anyang LG Cheetahs, 2004 Incheon United)
- Kazuyuki Toda (2009 Gyeongnam FC)
- Masahiro Ohashi (2009 & 2011 Gangwon FC)
- Kazunari Okayama (2009–2010 Pohang Steelers)
- Naohiro Takahara (2010 Suwon Samsung Bluewings)
- Yuta Baba (2011–2013 Daejeon Citizen)
- Akihiro Ienaga (2012 Ulsan Hyundai)
- Yusuke Shimada (2012 Gangwon FC)
- Sergio Escudero (2012–2015 FC Seoul, 2018 Ulsan Hyundai) ※ **Dual citizen** of Japan and Spain
- Chikashi Masuda (2013–2014 & 2015–2016 Ulsan Hyundai); also played in K League 2
- Yojiro Takahagi (2015–2016 FC Seoul)
- Tomoki Wada (2015 Incheon United, 2016–2017 Gwangju FC); also played in K League 2
- Takuma Abe (2017 Ulsan Hyundai)
- Yohei Toyoda (2018 Ulsan Hyundai)
- Takahiro Kunimoto (2018–2019 Gyeongnam FC, 2020–2022 Jeonbuk Hyundai Motors)
- Tsubasa Nishi (2018–2021 Daegu FC); also played in K League 2
- Takumi Kiyomoto (2019 Gangwon FC)
- Takahiro Nakazato (2019–2020 Gangwon FC)
- **Masatoshi Ishida** (2021 Gangwon FC, 2023–present Daejeon Hana Citizen); also played in K League 2
- Keita Suzuki (2022–2023 Daegu FC)
- Yuki Kobayashi (2022 Gangwon FC); also played in K League 2
- Jun Amano (2022 Ulsan Hyundai, 2023 Jeonbuk Hyundai Motors)
- Manabu Saitō (2022 Suwon Samsung Bluewings)
- Keijiro Ogawa (2022 FC Seoul)
- Ataru Esaka (2023–2024 Ulsan Hyundai)
- Kazuki Kozuka (2023 Suwon Samsung Bluewings); also played in K League 2
- Takuya Shigehiro (2024 FC Seoul)
- Yuta Kamiya (2024 Gangwon FC)
- Kyohei Yoshino (2024–2025 Daegu FC)
- **Kento Nishiya** (2026–present Pohang Steelers)
- **Kazuki Takahashi** (2026–present Bucheon FC 1995); also played in K League 2

=== Jordan ===
- **Yazan Al-Arab** (2024–present FC Seoul)

=== Korea DPR ===
- Ryang Kyu-sa (2001 Ulsan Hyundai)
- An Yong-hak (2006–2007 Busan IPark, 2008–2009 Suwon Samsung Bluewings)
- Jong Tae-se (2013–2015 Suwon Samsung Bluewings)
- An Byong-jun (2022–2023 Suwon Samsung Bluewings, 2024 Suwon FC); also played in K League 2
- **Ri Yong-jik** (2025 FC Anyang, 2026–present Gwangju FC); also played in K League 2

=== Palestine ===
- Éder Lima (2017 Jeonbuk Hyundai Motors, 2019 Seongnam FC); also played in K League 2 ※ **Dual citizen** of Palestine and Brazil (Note: Registered with Palestinian nationality until 2017, and with Brazilian nationality since 2018.)

=== Philippines ===
- Álvaro Silva (2015 Daejeon Citizen); also played in K League 2 ※ **Dual citizen** of the Philippines and Spain

=== Saudi Arabia ===
- Naji Majrashi (2011 Ulsan Hyundai)

=== Syria ===
- Hosam Aiesh (2023 FC Seoul) ※ **Dual citizen** of Syria and Sweden
- Pablo Sabbag (2025 Suwon FC) ※ **Dual citizen** of Syria and Colombia

=== Tajikistan ===
- Valeri Sarychev (1992–1998 Ilhwa Chunma, 2000–2004 LG Cheetahs) ※ **Dual citizen** of Tajikistan and South Korea
- Vitaliy Parakhnevych (1995–1998 Jeonbuk Hyundai Dinos, 1998–2000 Suwon Samsung Bluewings, 2001 Anyang LG Cheetahs, 2002 Bucheon SK) ※ **Dual citizen** of Tajikistan and Ukraine (Note: Vitaliy Parakhnevych's listed country in the K League player registration is Ukraine.)

=== Thailand ===
- Piyapong Pue-on (1984–1986 Lucky-Goldstar Hwangso)
- Sasalak Haiprakhon (2021 Jeonbuk Hyundai Motors)

=== Turkmenistan ===
- Sergey Agashkov (1992 Pohang Atoms)

=== Uzbekistan ===
- Server Djeparov (2010–2011 FC Seoul, 2013–2014 Seongnam Ilhwa Chunma, 2015 Ulsan Hyundai)
- Timur Kapadze (2011 Incheon United)
- Alexander Geynrikh (2011 Suwon Samsung Bluewings)
- Ikromjon Alibaev (2019–2020 FC Seoul, 2023 Gangwon FC); also played in K League 2
- Rustam Ashurmatov (2020 Gwangju FC, 2021 Gangwon FC); also played in K League 2
- Dostonbek Tursunov (2020 Busan IPark)
- Jamshid Iskanderov (2020–2021 Seongnam FC)
- Islom Kenjabaev (2021 Jeju United)

=== Vietnam ===
- Lương Xuân Trường (2016 Incheon United, 2017 Gangwon FC)
- Nguyễn Công Phượng (2019 Incheon United)

== Europe (UEFA) ==
=== Albania ===
- Adnan Oçelli (1996 Suwon Samsung Bluewings)
- Sokol Cikalleshi (2012 Incheon United)
- Jasir Asani (2023–2025 Gwangju FC)
- Eljon Sota (2024 Suwon FC)
- **Eraldo Çinari** (2026–present Jeju SK)

=== Armenia ===
- Karapet Mikaelyan (1997 Bucheon SK)

=== Austria ===
- Richard Windbichler (2017–2018 Ulsan Hyundai, 2021 Seongnam FC)
- Lukas Hinterseer (2021 Ulsan Hyundai)

=== Azerbaijan ===
- **Anton Kryvotsyuk** (2023–present Daejeon Hana Citizen)

=== Belarus ===
- Valery Vyalichka (1996 Ilhwa Chunma)

=== Belgium ===
- Rubenilson (1997–1998 Ilhwa Chunma) ※ **Dual citizen** of Belgium and Brazil (Note: Rubenilson's listed country in the K League player registration is Brazil.)
- Kevin Oris (2012 Daejeon Citizen, 2013 Jeonbuk Hyundai Motors, 2015–2016 Incheon United)
- Karel De Smet (2013 Daejeon Citizen)
- Marvin Ogunjimi (2016 Suwon FC)

=== Bosnia and Herzegovina ===
- Amir Teljigović (1994–1996 Daewoo Royals)
- Dragan Škrba (1995–1997 Pohang Atoms)
- Simo Krunić (1996 Pohang Atoms)
- Alen Avdić (2001–2002 & 2003 Suwon Samsung Bluewings)
- Slaviša Mitrović (2002 Suwon Samsung Bluewings)
- Jasmin Mujdža (2002 Seongnam Ilhwa Chunma) ※ **Dual citizen** of Bosnia and Herzegovina and Croatia (Note: Jasmin Mujdža's listed country in the K League player registration is Croatia.)
- Ivan Medvid (2002–2003 Pohang Steelers) ※ **Dual citizen** of Bosnia and Herzegovina and Croatia (Note: Ivan Medvid's listed country in the K League player registration is Croatia.)
- Nikola Vasiljević (2006–2007 Jeju United)
- Jusuf Dajić (2008 Jeonbuk Hyundai Motors)
- Samir Bekrić (2010 Incheon United)
- Muhamed Džakmić (2011–2012 Gangwon FC)
- Vladimir Jovančić (2012 Seongnam Ilhwa Chunma) ※ **Dual citizen** of Bosnia and Herzegovina and Serbia
- Jovica Stokić (2014 Jeju United)
- Gordan Bunoza (2017–2020 Incheon United) ※ **Dual citizen** of Bosnia and Herzegovina and Croatia (Note: Gordan Bunoza's listed country in the K League player registration is Croatia.)
- Elvis Sarić (2018–2019 & 2022 Suwon Samsung Bluewings)
- Sulejman Krpić (2020 Suwon Samsung Bluewings)
- Mario Kvesić (2021 Pohang Steelers) ※ **Dual citizen** of Bosnia and Herzegovina and Croatia (Note: Mario Kvesić's listed country in the K League player registration is Croatia.)
- Irfan Hadžić (2024 Gangwon FC)
- **Ivan Jukić** (2025–present FC Anyang) ※ **Dual citizen** of Bosnia and Herzegovina and Croatia

=== Bulgaria ===
- Filip Filipov (1992–1993 & 1998–1999 Yukong Elephants)
- Slavchev Toshev (1993 Yukong Elephants)
- Dimitar Ivanov (1998 Bucheon SK)
- Iliyan Mitsanski (2015 Suwon Samsung Bluewings)
- Momchil Tsvetanov (2021–2022 Gangwon FC)

=== Croatia ===
- Dževad Turković (1996, 1997–1999 Busan Daewoo Royals, 2000–2001 Busan I'Cons, 2001 Seongnam Ilhwa Chunma)
- Jasenko Sabitović (1998–2002 Pohang Steelers, 2003–2005 Seongnam Ilhwa Chunma, 2005–2007 Suwon Samsung Bluewings, 2008 Jeonnam Dragons)
- Branko Hucika (1999–2000 Ulsan Hyundai Horang-i)
- Fabijan Komljenović (2000 Pohang Steelers)
- Saša Milaimović (2000–2001 Pohang Steelers)
- Darko Čordaš (2001 Pohang Steelers)
- Mario Ivanković (2001–2002 Suwon Samsung Bluewings)
- Joško Jeličić (2002 Pohang Steelers)
- Leonard Bisaku (2002 Pohang Steelers, 2003 Seongnam Ilhwa Chunma)
- Boris Raič (2003–2005 Bucheon SK)
- Josip Šimić (2004 Ulsan Hyundai)
- Jasmin Agić (2005–2006 Incheon United)
- Mato Neretljak (2005–2008 & 2011 Suwon Samsung Bluewings)
- Frane Čačić (2007 Busan IPark)
- Antonio Franja (2007–2008 Jeonbuk Hyundai Motors)
- Stipe Lapić (2009–2011 Gangwon FC)
- Krunoslav Lovrek (2010–2011 Jeonbuk Hyundai Motors)
- Mateas Delić (2011–2012 Gangwon FC)
- Sandi Križman (2014 Jeonnam Dragons)
- Edin Junuzović (2014 Gyeongnam FC)
- Mislav Oršić (2015–2016 Jeonnam Dragons, 2017–2018 Ulsan Hyundai)
- Matej Jonjić (2015–2016 & 2024 Incheon United)
- Ivan Kovačec (2015–2017 Ulsan Hyundai, 2017–2018 FC Seoul)
- Vedran Jugović (2016–2018 Jeonnam Dragons)
- Damir Šovšić (2017 Suwon Samsung Bluewings); also played in K League 2 ※ **Dual citizen** of Croatia and Bosnia and Herzegovina
- Ivan Herceg (2018 Gyeongnam FC); also played in K League 2
- Tomislav Kiš (2020 Seongnam FC)
- Franko Kovačević (2024–2025 Gangwon FC)
- **Mario Ćuže** (2025–present Gangwon FC)
- Marko Dugandžić (2025 FC Seoul)
- **Hrvoje Babec** (2026–present FC Seoul)

=== Cyprus ===
- Valentinos Sielis (2017–2019 Gangwon FC); also played in K League 2

=== Czech Republic ===
- Petr Gottwald (1998 Jeonbuk Hyundai Dinos)
- Radek Divecký (2000 Jeonnam Dragons)
- František Koubek (2000–2001 Anyang LG Cheetahs)
- Petr Fousek (2001 Jeonnam Dragons)
- Tomáš Janda (2001 Anyang LG Cheetahs)
- Jan Kraus (2003 Daegu FC)
- Roman Gibala (2003 Daegu FC)
- Tomáš Petrášek (2023–2024 Jeonbuk Hyundai Motors)

=== Denmark ===
- Henrik Jørgensen (1996 Suwon Samsung Bluewings)
- Sebastian Grønning (2022 Suwon Samsung Bluewings)

=== England ===
- Dalian Atkinson (2001 Daejeon Citizen, 2001 Jeonbuk Hyundai Motors)
- Jamie Cureton (2003 Busan I'Cons)
- Andy Cooke (2003–2004 Busan I'Cons)
- Chris Marsden (2004 Busan I'Cons)
- Richard Offiong (2005 Jeonnam Dragons)
- Jordon Mutch (2019 Gyeongnam FC)
- Jesse Lingard (2024–2025 FC Seoul)

=== Finland ===
- Jukka Koskinen (1999 Anyang LG Cheetahs)
- Urho Nissilä (2022 Suwon FC)

=== France ===
- Kevin Hatchi (2009 FC Seoul)
- Jonathan Nanizayamo (2017 Gangwon FC)
- Leroy Abanda (2025 Suwon FC) ※ **Dual citizen** of France and Cameroon
- **Julien Célestine** (2026–present Jeju SK)

=== Georgia ===
- Valeri Qazaishvili (2021–2023 Ulsan Hyundai)
- Beka Mikeltadze (2023–2024 Gwangju FC)
- Giorgi Arabidze (2024 Ulsan HD)

=== Germany ===
- Dietmar Schacht (1985 POSCO Atoms)
- Frank Lieberam (1992 Hyundai Horang-i)
- Paulo Rink (2004 Jeonbuk Hyundai Motors) ※ **Dual citizen** of Germany and Brazil
- Stanislav Iljutcenko (2019–2020 Pohang Steelers, 2021–2022 Jeonbuk Hyundai Motors, 2022–2024 FC Seoul); also played in K League 2 ※ **Dual citizen** of Germany and Russia
- Igor Jovanović (2020 Seongnam FC) ※ **Dual citizen** of Germany and Croatia
- **Jakob Tranziska** (2026–present Pohang Steelers)

=== Hungary ===
- István Nyúl (1990 Lucky-Goldstar Hwangso)
- László Pecha (1990–1991 Pohang Atoms)
- Géza Mészöly (1990–1991 Pohang Atoms)
- Lajos Zentai (1991 LG Cheetahs)
- Zoltán Aczél (1991 Daewoo Royals)
- Attila Kámán (1994–1995 Yukong Elephants)
- József Somogyi (1994–1995 & 1996–1997 Yukong Elephants)
- Róbert Feczesin (2017 Jeonnam Dragons)
- Márk Koszta (2022 Ulsan Hyundai)
- Martin Ádám (2022–2024 Ulsan HD)

=== Iceland ===
- **Hólmbert Friðjónsson** (2025–present Gwangju FC)

=== Israel ===
- **Abdallah Hleihel** (2026–present Gangwon FC)

=== Italy ===
- Nicolao Dumitru (2021 Suwon Samsung Bluewings) ※ **Dual citizen** of Italy and Romania
- **Andrea Compagno** (2025–present Jeonbuk Hyundai Motors)

=== Latvia ===
- Ēriks Pelcis (1999–2000 Anyang LG Cheetahs)
- Vladislavs Gutkovskis (2023–2025 Daejeon Hana Citizen)

=== Lithuania ===
- Rolandas Karčemarskas (2000–2002 Bucheon SK)
- **Gytis Paulauskas** (2026–present Jeju SK, 2026–present Jeonbuk Hyundai Motors)

=== Moldova ===
- Boris Tropaneț (1996 Yukong Elephants)
- Alexandru Popovici (2001 Seongnam Ilhwa Chunma)
- Ion Testemițanu (2001 & 2004 Seongnam Ilhwa Chunma)

=== Montenegro ===
※ Includes players who joined in Federal Republic of Yugoslavia (1992–2003) and Serbia and Montenegro (2003–2006) period

- Boro Janičić (1994–1995 LG Cheetahs)
- Željko Bajčeta (1994 LG Cheetahs)
- Saša Petrović (1996–1997 Jeonnam Dragons)
- Aleksandar Vlahović (1997 Busan Daewoo Royals)
- Dženan Radončić (2004–2007 & 2008 Incheon United, 2009–2011 Seongnam Ilhwa Chunma, 2012–2013 Suwon Samsung Bluewings)
- Dejan Damjanović (2007 Incheon United, 2008–2013 & 2016–2017 FC Seoul, 2018–2019 Suwon Samsung Bluewings, 2020 Daegu FC)
- Bogdan Milić (2012 Gwangju FC); also played in K League 2
- Ivan Vuković (2013–2014 Seongnam FC)
- Stefan Nikolić (2014 Incheon United)
- Filip Kasalica (2014–2015 Ulsan Hyundai)
- Vladan Adžić (2016 Suwon FC, 2019 Pohang Steelers); also played in K League 2
- **Stefan Mugoša** (2018–2022, 2023–2024 & 2026–present Incheon United); also played in K League 2
- Dino Islamović (2022–2023 Gangwon FC) ※ **Dual citizen** of Montenegro and Sweden (Note: Dino Islamović's listed country in the K League player registration is Sweden.)
- Balša Sekulić (2022 Gangwon FC)
- Miloš Raičković (2022 Seongnam FC)
- **Marko Tući** (2023–present Gangwon FC)

=== Netherlands ===
- Rob Landsbergen (1984–1985 Hyundai Horang-i)
- Sander Oostrom (1997–1998 Pohang Steelers)
- Kiki Musampa (2008 FC Seoul) ※ **Dual citizen** of the Netherlands and DR Congo
- Bas van den Brink (2011 Busan IPark)
- Romeo Castelen (2016 Suwon Samsung Bluewings)
- Dave Bulthuis (2019–2021 Ulsan Hyundai, 2022–2023 Suwon Samsung Bluewings)
- Luc Castaignos (2019 Gyeongnam FC); also played in K League 2
- Timo Letschert (2023 Gwangju FC)
- **Thomas Oude Kotte** (2025–2026 FC Anyang, 2026–present Ulsan HD)
- **Teun van Grunsven** (2026–present Gwangju FC)
- **Danny Bakker** (2026–present FC Anyang)

=== North Macedonia ===
※ Known as Macedonia before 2019

- Saša Ilić (1995–1997 Busan Daewoo Royals)
- Žanko Savov (1995–1998 Jeonbuk Hyundai Dinos)
- Goran Petreski (2001–2004 Pohang Steelers)
- Blazhe Ilijoski (2006 Incheon United, 2010 Gangwon FC)
- Stevica Ristić (2007–2008 Jeonbuk Hyundai Motors, 2008–2009 Pohang Steelers, 2011–2013 Suwon Samsung Bluewings, 2015–2016 Jeonnam Dragons)
- Slavčo Georgievski (2009 Ulsan Hyundai)
- Dragan Čadikovski (2009–2010 Incheon United)
- Dušan Savić (2010 Incheon United)
- Krste Velkoski (2016 Incheon United)

=== Northern Ireland ===
- Niall McGinn (2017 Gwangju FC)

=== Norway ===
- Jon Olav Hjelde (2003 Busan I'Cons)
- Bjørn Maars Johnsen (2020 Ulsan Hyundai, 2023 FC Seoul) ※ **Dual citizen** of Norway and the United States
- Mohamed Ofkir (2025 Suwon FC)

=== Poland ===
- Leszek Iwanicki (1989 Yukong Elephants)
- Tadeusz Świątek (1989–1991 Yukong Elephants)
- Witold Bendkowski (1990–1992 Yukong Elephants)
- Krzysztof Kasztelan (1992 Yukong Elephants)
- Oskar Zawada (2021 Jeju United)
- **Patryk Klimala** (2025–present FC Seoul)
- **Miłosz Trojak** (2025–present Ulsan HD)

=== Portugal ===
- Rui Esteves (1997–1998 Busan Daewoo Royals)
- Simao Costa (2001 Daejeon Citizen)
- Pedro Franco (2005 FC Seoul)
- Ricardo Nascimento (2005–2007 FC Seoul)
- Ricardo Esteves (2010 FC Seoul)
- Ricardo Barros (2017 Gwangju FC)
- Ronaldo Tavares (2024 FC Seoul) ※ **Dual citizen** of Portugal and São Tomé and Príncipe
- **João Gamboa** (2025–present Jeonbuk Hyundai Motors)
- **Tobias Figueiredo** (2026–present Jeju SK)

=== Romania ===
- Marcel Lăzăreanu (1990–1991 Ilhwa Chunma)
- Pavel Badea (1996–1998 Suwon Samsung Bluewings)
- Constantin Barbu (1997 Suwon Samsung Bluewings)
- Cosmin Olăroiu (1997–2000 Suwon Samsung Bluewings)
- Mihai Drăguș (1998 Suwon Samsung Bluewings)
- Cristian Dulca (1999 Pohang Steelers)
- Iulian Arhire (1999 Pohang Steelers)
- Ion Ionuț Luțu (2000–2002 Suwon Samsung Bluewings)
- Gabriel Popescu (2002–2004 Suwon Samsung Bluewings)
- Adrian Mihalcea (2005 Jeonnam Dragons)
- Marian Aliuță (2005 Jeonnam Dragons)
- Adrian Neaga (2005–2006 Jeonnam Dragons, 2006–2007 Seongnam Ilhwa Chunma)
- Ianis Zicu (2012 Pohang Steelers, 2012–2013 Gangwon FC)
- Sergiu Buș (2021 Seongnam FC)

=== Russia ===
- Mikhail Solovyov (1992 Ilhwa Chunma)
- Almir Kayumov (1993 Daewoo Royals)
- Yevgeny Zhirov (1994 LG Cheetahs)
- Aleksei Sudarikov (1994 LG Cheetahs)
- Aleksandr Podshivalov (1994–1997 Yukong Elephants)
- Kirill Varaksin (1995 Yukong Elephants)
- Yuri Shishkin (1995 Jeonnam Dragons)
- Gennadi Styopushkin (1995–1996 Ilhwa Chunma, 1997 LG Cheetahs)
- Aleksei Prudnikov (1995–1998 Jeonbuk Hyundai Dinos)
- Aleksey Shchigolev (1996 Yukong Elephants)
- Sergey Burdin (1996–1997 Yukong Elephants, 1999–2000 Seongnam Ilhwa Chunma)
- Dmitri Karsakov (1996 Yukong Elephants)
- Valeri Shmarov (1996 Jeonnam Dragons)
- Yevgeni Kuznetsov (1996 Jeonnam Dragons)
- Yuri Matveyev (1996–1997 Suwon Samsung Bluewings)
- Boris Vostrosablin (1997–1998 Bucheon SK)
- Denis Laktionov (1996–2002 & 2006–2007 Suwon Samsung Bluewings, 2003–2005 Seongnam Ilhwa Chunma, 2005 Busan IPark, 2012–2013 Gangwon FC)
- Oleg Yeryomin (1997 Pohang Steelers)
- Oleg Yelyshev (1997–1999 Anyang LG Cheetahs)
- Andrei Solomatin (2004 Seongnam Ilhwa Chunma)

=== Serbia ===
※ Includes players who played during the Federal Republic of Yugoslavia (1992–2003) and Serbia and Montenegro (2003–2006) period

- Nebojša Vučićević (1991–1993 Daewoo Royals)
- Rade Bogdanović (1992–1996 Pohang Atoms)
- Zoran Kuntić (1993 Pohang Atoms)
- Zoran Vukčević (1993 Hyundai Horang-i)
- Goran Jevtić (1993–1995 Hyundai Horang-i)
- Aleksandar Jozević (1993 Daewoo Royals)
- Đorđe Vasić (1994 Ilhwa Chunma)
- Nebojša Maksimović (1994 Ilhwa Chunma)
- Željko Simović (1994 Daewoo Royals)
- Jovan Šarčević (1994–1995 LG Cheetahs)
- Boško Minić (1995 Jeonnam Dragons)
- Saša Drakulić (1995–1998 Busan Daewoo Royals, 1998–2000 Suwon Samsung Bluewings, 2001–2003 Seongnam Ilhwa Chunma)
- Ljubiša Ranković (1995–1996 Ilhwa Chunma)
- Nenad Nonković (1995–1996 Ilhwa Chunma)
- Branko Božović (1996 Hyundai Horang-i)
- Dražen Podunavac (1996 Busan Daewoo Royals)
- Zoran Đurišić (1996 Hyundai Horang-i)
- Radivoje Manić (1996–1997 & 1999–2002 Busan Daewoo Royals, 2004–2005 Incheon United)
- Radmilo Mihajlović (1997 Pohang Steelers)
- Rahim Beširović (1998–1999 Busan Daewoo Royals)
- Zoran Novaković (1998–1999 Busan Daewoo Royals)
- Branko Radovanović (1999 Busan Daewoo Royals)
- Mirko Jovanović (1999–2000 Jeonbuk Hyundai Dinos)
- Zoran Milošević (1999–2001 Jeonbuk Hyundai Dinos)
- Zoran Urumov (1999–2003 Busan Daewoo Royals, 2003–2004 Suwon Samsung Bluewings)
- Nemanja Dančetović (2000 Ulsan Hyundai Horang-i)
- Zoltan Sabo (2000–2002 Suwon Samsung Bluewings)
- Dragan Stojisavljević (2000–2001 & 2003–2004 Anyang LG Cheetahs / FC Seoul, 2004 Incheon United)
- Dušan Šimić (2003 Busan I'Cons)
- Đorđe Tomić (2004 Incheon United)
- Miodrag Anđelković (2004 Incheon United)
- Dragan Mladenović (2006–2009 Incheon United)
- Ivan Perić (2007 Jeju United)
- Željko Kalajdžić (2007 Incheon United)
- Aleksandar Petrović (2008–2009 Jeonbuk Hyundai Motors, 2009 Jeonnam Dragons)
- Borko Veselinović (2008–2009 Incheon United)
- Lazar Popović (2009 Daegu FC)
- Stevan Račić (2009 Daejeon Citizen)
- Ognjen Koroman (2009–2010 Incheon United)
- Zoran Rendulić (2012 Pohang Steelers)
- Miloš Bosančić (2013–2014 Gyeongnam FC)
- Sreten Sretenović (2013–2014 Gyeongnam FC)
- Milan Bubalo (2013 Gyeongnam FC)
- Nikola Komazec (2014 Busan IPark)
- Miloš Stojanović (2014 Gyeongnam FC); also played in K League 2
- Lazar Veselinović (2015–2016 Pohang Steelers)
- Dalibor Veselinović (2017 Incheon United)
- Uroš Đerić (2018–2019 Gangwon FC, 2019 Gyeongnam FC, 2021 Suwon Samsung Bluewings); also played in K League 2
- Bojan Matić (2018 FC Seoul)
- Aleksandar Pešić (2019–2020 FC Seoul)
- Aleksandar Paločević (2019–2020 Pohang Steelers, 2021–2026 FC Seoul)
- Vladimir Silađi (2021 Gangwon FC)
- Fejsal Mulić (2021–2022 Seongnam FC, 2023 Suwon Samsung Bluewings); also played in K League 2
- **Branislav Knežević** (2026–present FC Anyang)

=== Slovenia ===
- Sebastjan Cimirotič (2005 Incheon United)
- **Emir Saitoski** (2026–present Gwangju FC) ※ **Dual citizen** of Slovenia and North Macedonia

=== Spain ===
- Osmar (2014–2017 & 2019–2023 FC Seoul); also played in K League 2
- Urko Vera (2015 Jeonbuk Hyundai Motors)
- Jaime Gavilán (2016 Suwon FC); also played in K League 2
- **Iker Undabarrena** (2026–present Incheon United)
- **Juan Antonio Ros** (2026–present FC Seoul)
- **Juan Ibiza** (2026–present Incheon United)

=== Sweden ===
- Marcus Nilsson (2017 Pohang Steelers)
- Jonathan Ring (2022–2023 Jeju United)
- Kevin Höög Jansson (2022–2023 Gangwon FC)
- **Darijan Bojanić** (2023–present Ulsan HD)
- **Gustav Ludwigson** (2023–2025 Ulsan HD, 2026–present Daejeon Hana Citizen)
- **Abdelkarim Mammar** (2026–present Gangwon FC) ※ **Dual citizen** of Sweden and Algeria

=== Switzerland ===
- Danijel Subotić (2017 Ulsan Hyundai)

=== Turkey ===
- Seyit Cem Ünsal (1997–1998 Anyang LG Cheetahs)
- Mustafa Gönden (2002–2003 Bucheon SK)
- Rahim Zafer (2003 Daegu FC)
- Alpay Özalan (2004 Incheon United)
- Ceyhun Eriş (2008 FC Seoul)

=== Ukraine ===
- Andriy Sidelnikov (1995–1996 Jeonnam Dragons)
- Volodymyr Savchenko (1996 Anyang LG Cheetahs)
- Serhiy Skachenko (1996–1997 Anyang LG Cheetahs, 1997 Jeonnam Dragons)
- Serhiy Konovalov (1996–1998 Pohang Atoms)
- Artem Yashkin (2004 Bucheon SK)
- Borys Tashchy (2021 Pohang Steelers) ※ **Dual citizen** of Ukraine and Bulgaria (Note: Borys Tashchy's listed country in the K League player registration is Bulgaria.)

== North America, Central America and Caribbean (CONCACAF) ==
=== Canada ===
- Doneil Henry (2020–2021 Suwon Samsung Bluewings)

=== Costa Rica ===
- Jeaustin Campos (1995–1996 LG Cheetahs)
- Elias Aguilar (2018 & 2020–2022 Incheon United, 2019 Jeju United; also played in K League 2
- Marco Ureña (2020 Gwangju FC)

=== Guyana ===
- **Morgan Ferrier** (2026–present Incheon United) ※ **Dual citizen** of Guyana and England

=== Martinique ===
- Mathias Coureur (2019 Seongnam FC)

=== United States ===
- Jeff Yoo (2000 Ulsan Hyundai Horang-i, 2001 Bucheon SK)
- Mix Diskerud (2018–2019 Ulsan Hyundai) ※ **Dual citizen** of United States and Norway (Note: Mix Diskerud's listed country in the K League player registration is Norway.)
- **Benji Michel** (2026–present Ulsan HD)

== South America (CONMEBOL) ==
=== Argentina ===
- Rubén Bernuncio (1993–1994 Daewoo Royals)
- Hugo Smaldone (1993 Daewoo Royals)
- Walter Perazzo (1994 Daewoo Royals)
- Rubén Rossi (1994 Daewoo Royals)
- Leonardo Torres (2001 Jeonbuk Hyundai Motors)
- Javier Musa (2004–2005 Suwon Samsung Bluewings, 2005 Ulsan Hyundai)
- Lucio Filomeno (2005 Busan IPark)
- Fabián Caballero (2007 Daejeon Citizen) ※ **Dual citizen** of Argentina and Spain
- Lucas Basualdo (2010 Daegu FC)
- Isaac Acosta (2010 Daegu FC)
- Pitu García (2016–2017 Seongnam FC)
- Enzo Maidana (2017 Incheon United)

=== Bolivia ===
- Juan Carlos Arce (2008 Seongnam Ilhwa Chunma)

=== Brazil ===
- Roberto (1983 POSCO Dolphins) ※ **First foreign players**
- Sergio (1983 POSCO Dolphins) ※ **First foreign players**
- Julio César (1984 POSCO Dolphins)
- Luis (1984 POSCO Dolphins)
- Wilsinho (1984 POSCO Dolphins)
- Zézé Gomes (1984 POSCO Dolphins)
- Flávio Almeida (1985 POSCO Atoms)
- Paulinho Criciúma (1985–1986 POSCO Atoms)
- Perivaldo (1987 Yukong Elephants)
- Ronaldo (1994 Hyundai Horang-i)
- Pires (1994 Hyundai Horang-i)
- Ricardo (1994 Pohang Atoms)
- Silvan (1994–1995 Pohang Atoms)
- Maurício (1994–1995 Hyundai Horang-i)
- Marcos Severo (1995 Hyundai Horang-i)
- Alaor (1996 Suwon Samsung Bluewings)
- Cleomir (1997 Jeonnam Dragons)
- Maciel (1997–2003 Jeonnam Dragons)
- Adão (1998 Jeonnam Dragons)
- Marcelo Sander (1998 Bucheon SK)
- Rodrigo Carbone (1999 Jeonnam Dragons)
- Rémerson (1999–2000 Ulsan Hyundai Horang-i)
- Cezinha (1999–2002 Jeonnam Dragons)
- Rogerio Prateat (1999–2002 Jeonbuk Hyundai Motors, 2003 Daegu FC)
- Dimas (2000 Jeonnam Dragons)
- Josimar (2000 Pohang Steelers)
- Joílson (2000 Seongnam Ilhwa Chunma)
- Marcelo (2000 Seongnam Ilhwa Chunma)
- André (2000–2002 Anyang LG Cheetahs)
- Ricardo Campos (2000–2004 Anyang LG Cheetahs / FC Seoul, 2005–2006 Seongnam Ilhwa Chunma, 2006 Busan IPark)
- Sandro (2000–2002 & 2005–2006 Suwon Samsung Bluewings, 2006–2007 Jeonnam Dragons)
- Ricardo Boiadeiro (2001 Pohang Steelers)
- Claudio (2001 Ulsan Hyundai Horang-i)
- Rincon (2001 Jeonbuk Hyundai Motors)
- Sérgio (2001 Anyang LG Cheetahs)
- Renato Olegario (2001 Busan I'Cons)
- Arinélson (2001 Jeonbuk Hyundai Motors, 2002 Ulsan Hyundai Horang-i)
- Marcos Antônio (2001–2002 Ulsan Hyundai Horang-i)
- Paulinho (2001–2002 Ulsan Hyundai Horang-i)
- Iván (2001–2002 Jeonnam Dragons)
- Cléber (2001–2003 Ulsan Hyundai Horang-i)
- Tico Mineiro (2001–2003 Jeonnam Dragons)
- Julinho (2001–2002 Jeonbuk Hyundai Motors, 2003–2004 Jeonnam Dragons)
- Irineu Ricardo (2001–2004 Seongnam Ilhwa Chunma, 2004–2007 Bucheon SK)
- Didi (2002 Busan I'Cons)
- Jorginho (2002 Pohang Steelers)
- Kuki (2002 Jeonbuk Hyundai Motors)
- Léomar Leiria (2002 Jeonbuk Hyundai Motors)
- Marcos Denner (2002 Anyang LG Cheetahs)
- Alcir (2002 Seongnam Ilhwa Chunma)
- Paulo César (2002 Seongnam Ilhwa Chunma)
- Marquinhos Paraná (2002 Jeonnam Dragons)
- Tuta (2002 Anyang LG Cheetahs, 2003 Suwon Samsung Bluewings)
- Edmilson Alves (2002–2003 Ulsan Hyundai Horang-i)
- Alison (2002–2003 Ulsan Hyundai Horang-i, 2003–2005 Daejeon Citizen)
- Edmilson (2002–2005 Jeonbuk Hyundai Motors) ※ **Dual citizen** of Brazil and Portugal
- Raphael Botti (2002–2006 Jeonbuk Hyundai Motors)
- Agnaldo (2003 Anyang LG Cheetahs)
- Tico (2003 Daejeon Citizen)
- Balão (2003 Ulsan Hyundai Horang-i)
- Cadu (2003 Jeonbuk Hyundai Motors)
- Cassiano (2003 Pohang Steelers)
- Grafite (2003 Anyang LG Cheetahs)
- José (2003 Pohang Steelers)
- Lúcio Bala (2003 Ulsan Hyundai Horang-i)
- Luís Mário (2003 Anyang LG Cheetahs)
- Magno Alves (2003 Jeonbuk Hyundai Motors)
- Michel (2003 Jeonnam Dragons)
- Fernandes (2003 Jeonbuk Hyundai Motors)
- Victor (2003 Anyang LG Cheetahs)
- Dodô (2003–2004 Ulsan Hyundai Horang-i)
- Rodrigo (2003–2004 Daejeon Citizen)
- Índio (2003 Pohang Steelers, 2003–2005 Daegu FC)
- Itamar (2003–2004 Jeonnam Dragons, 2005 Pohang Steelers, 2005–2006 Suwon Samsung Bluewings, 2006–2007 Seongnam Ilhwa Chunma)
- Nádson (2003–2005 & 2007 Suwon Samsung Bluewings)
- Rogério Pinheiro (2003–2005 Pohang Steelers, 2006–2008 Gyeongnam FC)
- Eninho (2003 Suwon Samsung Bluewings, 2007–2008 Daegu FC, 2009–2013 & 2015 Jeonbuk Hyundai Motors)
- Adhemar (2004 Seongnam Ilhwa Chunma)
- Adriano Magrão (2004 Busan I'Cons)
- Allan Aal (2004 Daejeon Citizen)
- Caio (2004 Jeonnam Dragons)
- Celso Neves (2004 Busan I'Cons)
- Cristiano Ávalos (2004 Suwon Samsung Bluewings)
- Daniel Mendes (2004 Ulsan Hyundai Horang-i)
- Danilo (2004 Daegu FC)
- Edu Sales (2004 Jeonbuk Hyundai Motors)
- Flamarion (2004 Daejeon Citizen)
- Fumagalli (2004 FC Seoul)
- Gaúcho (2004 Busan I'Cons)
- Marcel (2004 & 2011 Suwon Samsung Bluewings)
- Marcelo Macedo (2004 Seongnam Ilhwa Chunma)
- Marcelo Souza (2004 FC Seoul)
- Mário Sérgio (2004 Ulsan Hyundai Horang-i)
- Renaldo (2004 FC Seoul)
- Rinaldo (2004 FC Seoul)
- Roma (2004 Jeonbuk Hyundai Motors)
- Tiago (2004 Daejeon Citizen)
- Valentim (2004 FC Seoul)
- Zé Carlos (2004 Pohang Steelers)
- Henrique Dias (2004–2005 Daejeon Citizen)
- Jefferson Feijão (2004 Daegu FC, 2005 Seongnam Ilhwa Chunma)
- André (2004 Jeonbuk Hyundai Motors, 2005 Pohang Steelers)
- Nonato (2004 Daegu FC, 2005 FC Seoul)
- Santiago (2004–2005 Daegu FC)
- William (2004 Ulsan Hyundai Horang-i, 2007 Busan IPark)
- Andrezinho (2004–2007 Pohang Steelers)
- Luciano (2004 Daejeon Citizen, 2005 & 2007 Busan IPark, 2006 Gyeongnam FC)
- Dudu (2004–2006 Seongnam Ilhwa Chunma, 2006–2007 FC Seoul, 2008 Seongnam Ilhwa Chunma)
- Zé Carlos (2004–2005 Ulsan Hyundai Horang-i, 2006–2008 Jeonbuk Hyundai Motors)
- Mota (2004 Jeonnam Dragons, 2005–2009 Seongnam Ilhwa Chunma, 2010–2011 Pohang Steelers)
- Agos (2005 Bucheon SK)
- Paulo César (2005 Jeonbuk Hyundai Motors)
- Da Silva (2005 FC Seoul)
- Fábio Junior (2005 Jeonnam Dragons)
- Fábio Pereira (2005 Jeonnam Dragons)
- Fabrício (2005 Seongnam Ilhwa Chunma)
- Barbieri (2005 Ulsan Hyundai Horang-i)
- Luciano Ratinho (2005 Daejeon Citizen)
- Brandão (2005 Daegu FC)
- Silva (2005 Daegu FC)
- Moreira (2005 Jeonbuk Hyundai Motors)
- Neto Baiano (2005 Jeonbuk Hyundai Motors)
- Reinaldo (2005 Ulsan Hyundai Horang-i)
- Ricardo Villar (2005 Jeonnam Dragons)
- Sérgio Júnior (2005 Bucheon SK)
- Thiago Gentil (2005 Daegu FC)
- Wellington Amorim (2005 Pohang Steelers)
- Da Silva (2005 Pohang Steelers, 2005 Busan IPark, 2006 Jeju United)
- Marco Antônio (2005–2006 Jeonbuk Hyundai Motors)
- Leandrão (2005 Daejeon Citizen, 2006 Ulsan Hyundai Horang-i, 2007 Jeonnam Dragons)
- Leandro Machado (2005–2007 Ulsan Hyundai Horang-i)
- Popó (2005–2006 Busan IPark, 2007 Gyeongnam FC)
- Selmir (2005–2006 Incheon United, 2006 Jeonnam Dragons, 2007 Daegu FC, 2008 Daejeon Citizen)
- Sandro Hiroshi (2005 Daegu FC, 2006–2008 Jeonnam Dragons, 2009 Suwon Samsung Bluewings)
- Carlos Frontini (2006–2007 Pohang Steelers) ※ **Dual citizen** of Brazil and Argentina
- Gefferson Goulart (2006 Busan IPark)
- Dinei (2006 Daegu FC)
- Eduardo Marques (2006 Daegu FC)
- Eduardo Rato (2006 Daejeon Citizen)
- Gabriel Lima (2006 Daegu FC)
- Jefferson (2006 Daegu FC)
- Luciano Henrique (2006 Pohang Steelers)
- Marco Aurélio (2006 Jeju United)
- Régis Pitbull (2006 Daejeon Citizen)
- Robson (2006 Daejeon Citizen)
- Elpídio Silva (2006 Suwon Samsung Bluewings)
- Somália (2006 Busan IPark)
- Vinícius (2006 Ulsan Hyundai Horang-i)
- Denilson (2006–2007 Daejeon Citizen, 2008–2009 Pohang Steelers)
- Adriano Chuva (2006 & 2007 Daejeon Citizen, 2008–2010 Jeonnam Dragons, 2011 Pohang Steelers, 2012 Gwangju FC)
- Adilson (2006–2013 FC Seoul)
- Alex Oliveira (2007 Jeju United)
- Caboré (2007 Gyeongnam FC)
- Ciel (2007 Busan IPark)
- Schwenck (2007 Pohang Steelers)
- Fernandinho (2007 Daejeon Citizen)
- Fernando (2007 Busan IPark)
- Jonhes (2007 Pohang Steelers)
- Maurício Fernandes (2007 Pohang Steelers)
- Ricardinho (2007–2008 Jeju United)
- Victor Simões (2007–2008 Jeonnam Dragons)
- Brasília (2007 Daejeon Citizen, 2008 Ulsan Hyundai Horang-i, 2009 Pohang Steelers, 2009 Jeonbuk Hyundai Motors)
- Edu (2007–2009 Suwon Samsung Bluewings, 2015 & 2016–2017 Jeonbuk Hyundai Motors)
- Luizinho (2007 Daegu FC, 2008–2009 Ulsan Hyundai Horang-i, 2011 Incheon United)
- Almir (2007 & 2008–2009 Ulsan Hyundai Horang-i, 2010 Pohang Steelers, 2011 Incheon United)
- Alexsandro (2008 Daegu FC)
- Clodoaldo (2008 Pohang Steelers)
- Edson Araújo (2008 Daejeon Citizen)
- Fabiano Gadelha (2008 Pohang Steelers)
- Geovane (2008 Daegu FC)
- Jou Silva (2008 Daegu FC)
- Ferreira (2008 Ulsan Hyundai Horang-i)
- Leandro (2008 Daegu FC)
- Rafael Paty (2008 Jeju United)
- Pedrão (2008 Seongnam Ilhwa Chunma)
- Pingo (2008 Busan IPark)
- Reinaldo (2008 Busan IPark)
- Renato (2008 Jeonnam Dragons)
- Zé Augusto (2008 Busan IPark)
- Ednilton (2008 Jeju United)
- Lucas Pereira (2008 Suwon Samsung Bluewings)
- Walter Minhoca (2008 Daejeon Citizen)
- Wellington Silva (2008 Gyeongnam FC)
- Almir (2008 Gyeongnam FC, 2014 Ulsan Hyundai); also played in K League 2
- Di Fábio (2008–2009 Busan IPark)
- Paulinho Guará (2008–2009 Busan IPark)
- Rômulo (2008 Jeju United, 2009–2010 Busan IPark)
- Índio (2008–2009 Gyeongnam FC, 2010–2011 Jeonnam Dragons)
- Luiz Henrique (2008 Suwon Samsung Bluewings, 2008–2012 & 2015–2016 Jeonbuk Hyundai Motors); also played in K League 2
- Anderson (2009 FC Seoul)
- Bruno Cazarine (2009 Gyeongnam FC)
- Claudinho (2009 Gyeongnam FC)
- Fábio Luís (2009 Ulsan Hyundai Horang-i)
- Esquerdinha (2009 Jeju United)
- Jorge Luiz (2009 Suwon Samsung Bluewings)
- Jóbson (2009 Jeju United)
- Marcelo Pinheiro (2009 Gyeongnam FC)
- Ricardinho (2009 Jeju United)
- Ricardo Costa (2009 Daejeon Citizen)
- Rogério Conceição (2009 Gyeongnam FC)
- Tiago (2009 Suwon Samsung Bluewings)
- Vaguinho (2009 Pohang Steelers)
- Valdeir (2009 Daegu FC)
- Wesley (2009 Jeonnam Dragons, 2013 Gangwon FC)
- Alexandre (2009–2010 Daejeon Citizen)
- Caion (2009–2010 Gangwon FC, 2018 Daegu FC)
- Fabricio Souza (2009–2010 Seongnam Ilhwa Chunma)
- Léo Paulista (2009–2010 Daegu FC)
- Válber (2009–2010 Daejeon Citizen)
- Zacarias (2010 Daejeon Citizen)
- Júnior Santos (2010–2012 Jeju United, 2013–2017 Suwon Samsung Bluewings)
- Alexandro (2010 Pohang Steelers)
- Anderson Andrade (2010 Daegu FC)
- Bruno Correa (2010 Incheon United)
- Camilo Sanvezzo (2010 Gyeongnam FC)
- Danilo Neco (2010 Jeju United); also played in K League 2
- Fábio Lopes (2010 Daejeon Citizen)
- Eraldo (2010 Jeju United)
- Juninho (2010 Suwon Samsung Bluewings)
- Léo Mineiro (2010 Jeju United, 2017 Daegu FC); also played in K League 2
- Marcelo Brás (2010 Gyeongnam FC)
- Marcinho (2010 Gyeongnam FC)
- Márcio Diogo (2010 Suwon Samsung Bluewings)
- Reinaldo (2010 Suwon Samsung Bluewings)
- Renato Medeiros (2010 Gangwon FC)
- Zulu (2010 Pohang Steelers)
- Felipe Azevedo (2010–2011 Busan IPark)
- Lúcio Curió (2010–2011 Gyeongnam FC, 2011 Ulsan Hyundai); also played in K League 2
- José Mota (2010 Suwon Samsung Bluewings, 2012 Busan IPark)
- Lima (2010 FC Seoul)
- Bérgson (2011 Suwon Samsung Bluewings, 2015 Busan IPark)
- Alessandro Celin (2011 Gwangju FC)
- Diego Giaretta (2011 Incheon United) ※ **Dual citizen** of Brazil and Italy
- Diego Oliveira (2011 Suwon Samsung Bluewings)
- Fábio Bahia (2011 Incheon United)
- Felipinho (2011 Jeju United)
- Jean Carlos (2011 Seongnam Ilhwa Chunma)
- Juninho (2011 Daegu FC)
- Magnum (2011 Ulsan Hyundai)
- Marcos Vinicius (2011 Ulsan Hyundai)
- Morato (2011 Gyeongnam FC)
- Tássio (2011 Busan IPark)
- Thiago Quirino (2011 Daegu FC)
- Vinícius Lopes (2011 Gwangju FC)
- Wagner Querino (2011 Daejeon Citizen); also played in K League 2
- Wando (2011 Suwon Samsung Bluewings)
- Wésley Brasilia (2011 Daejeon Citizen)
- Héverton (2011–2012 Seongnam Ilhwa Chunma)
- Éder Baiano (2011–2012 Busan IPark)
- Éverton Santos (2011–2012 Seongnam Ilhwa Chunma, 2014–2015 FC Seoul, 2015 Ulsan Hyundai)
- Jair (2011–2012 Jeju United, 2016–2017 Jeonnam Dragons)
- Matheus (2011–2012 Daegu FC); also played in K League 2
- Roni (2011–2012 Gyeongnam FC)
- Fagner (2011–2014 Busan IPark)
- João Paulo (2011–2012 Gwangju FC, 2013 Daejeon Citizen, 2014 Incheon United)
- Elionar Bombinha (2011 Incheon United)
- Weslley (2011 & 2013 Jeonnam Dragons, 2012 Gangwon FC, 2015 Busan IPark, 2017 Incheon United)
- Alessandro Lopes (2012 Daejeon Citizen); also played in K League 2
- Alex Terra (2012 Daejeon Citizen)
- Dinélson (2012 Daegu FC)
- Everton (2012 Suwon Samsung Bluewings)
- Ferdinando (2012 Incheon United)
- Henan (2012 Jeonnam Dragons, 2016 Jeju United); also played in K League 2
- Ivo (2012 & 2014 Incheon United)
- Jael (2012 Seongnam Ilhwa Chunma)
- Leleco (2012 Jeonnam Dragons)
- Leozinho (2012 Daejeon Citizen)
- Lúcio Flávio (2012 Jeonnam Dragons, 2013 Daejeon Citizen)
- Paulo Cortez (2012 Jeonnam Dragons)
- Paulo Júnior (2012 Incheon United)
- Renan Marques (2012 Jeju United)
- Robert (2012 Jeju United)
- Leandrinho (2012 & 2013 Daegu FC, 2014–2015 Jeonnam Dragons)
- Caíque (2012 Gyeongnam FC, 2013–2014 Ulsan Hyundai)
- Leonardo (2012–2016 Jeonbuk Hyundai Motors)
- Maranhão (2012 Ulsan Hyundai, 2013 Jeju United); also played in K League 2
- Rafinha (2012–2014 Ulsan Hyundai)
- Adriano Pardal (2013 Daegu FC)
- Fábio Santos (2013 Daegu FC)
- Rodrigo Pimpão (2013 Suwon Samsung Bluewings)
- Waldison (2013 Jeju United)
- Diogo Acosta (2013 & 2014 Incheon United)
- Edcarlos (2013 Seongnam Ilhwa Chunma)
- Marcinho (2013 Jeonnam Dragons)
- Pedro Júnior (2013 Jeju United)
- Roberto César (2013 Ulsan Hyundai)
- Rodrigo (2013 Busan IPark)
- Rodriguinho (2013 Jeju United)
- Sandro (2013 Daegu FC)
- Thiago Elias (2013 Incheon United)
- Thiago Jefferson (2013 Jeonbuk Hyundai Motors)
- William (2013 Busan IPark)
- Rafael Costa (2014 FC Seoul)
- Marcos Aurélio (2014 Jeonbuk Hyundai Motors)
- Kaio (2014 Jeonbuk Hyundai Motors, 2015 Suwon Samsung Bluewings)
- Valdivia (2014 Seongnam FC)
- Nilson (2014–2015 Busan IPark); also played in K League 2
- Roger (2014 Suwon Samsung Bluewings)
- Reiner Ferreira (2014 Suwon Samsung Bluewings)
- Tartá (2014–2015 Ulsan Hyundai)
- Wander Luiz (2014 Ulsan Hyundai)
- Vinícius Reche (2014 Jeonbuk Hyundai Motors)
- Jacio (2014 Busan IPark)
- Thiago Alagoano (2014 Jeju United)
- Adriano (2015 Daejeon Citizen, 2015–2016 & 2020 FC Seoul, 2018–2019 Jeonbuk Hyundai Motors); also played in K League 2
- André Moritz (2015 Pohang Steelers) ※ **Dual citizen** of Brazil and Italy
- Fábio Neves (2015–2016 Gwangju FC); also played in K League 2
- **Wanderson** (2015 Daejeon Citizen, 2016 Jeju United, 2017, 2019 & 2022–present Pohang Steelers, 2018 Jeonnam Dragons; also played in K League 2
- Tiago Alves (2015 Pohang Steelers, 2016 Seongnam FC, 2018–2019 Jeonbuk Hyundai Motors, 2025 Jeju SK)
- Ricardo Lopes (2015 Jeju United, 2016–2019 Jeonbuk Hyundai Motors, 2023 Suwon FC); also played in K League 2
- Fernando Karanga (2015 Jeju United)
- Léo Itaperuna (2015 Suwon Samsung Bluewings)
- Ricardo Bueno (2015 Seongnam FC)
- Jorginho (2015 Seongnam FC)
- Lucas Pajeú (2015 Seongnam FC)
- Gilberto Fortunato (2015 Gwangju FC)
- Bill (2015 Busan IPark)
- Ricardinho (2015 Daejeon Citizen)
- Sassá (2015 Daejeon Citizen)
- Bernardo (2016 Ulsan Hyundai)
- Marcelo Toscano (2016–2017 Jeju United)
- Johnathan Goiano (2016–2017 Suwon Samsung Bluewings, 2021 Gwangju FC); also played in K League 2
- Célio Santos (2016 Ulsan Hyundai)
- Lulinha (2016–2017 Pohang Steelers)
- Muralha (2016–2017 Pohang Steelers)
- Maurinho (2016 Jeonnam Dragons, 2017 FC Seoul)
- Gerson (2017 Gangwon FC)
- Mazola (2017 Jeonbuk Hyundai Motors)
- Diego Maurício (2017–2018 Gangwon FC); also played in K League 2
- Magno Cruz (2017–2019 Jeju United)
- Wanderson (2017 Gwangju FC, 2018 Jeonnam Dragons); also played in K League 2
- Cesinha (2017–2025 Daegu FC); also played in K League 2
- Júnior Negrão (2017 Daegu FC, 2018–2020 Ulsan Hyundai)
- Evandro Paulista (2017 Daegu FC, 2018 FC Seoul)
- Mailson (2017 Jeju United)
- Anderson Lopes (2018 FC Seoul)
- Alemão (2018 Pohang Steelers)
- Getterson (2018 Pohang Steelers)
- Negueba (2018–2019 Gyeongnam FC, 2021 Incheon United); also played in K League 2
- Tiago Marques (2018–2019 Jeju United)
- Cristovam (2018 Suwon Samsung Bluewings)
- Jean Carlos (2018 Daegu FC)
- Zé Roberto (2018 Daegu FC)
- **Marcão** (2018 Gyeongnam FC, 2025–present Ulsan HD); also played in K League 2
- Waguininho (2018–2019 Suwon Samsung Bluewings); also played in K League 2
- Edgar (2018–2022 & 2023–2025 Daegu FC); also played in K League 2
- Dário Júnior (2019 Daegu FC)
- David da Silva (2019 Pohang Steelers)
- Rildo (2019 Daegu FC)
- Osman Júnior (2019 Gyeongnam FC)
- Rômulo (2020 Busan IPark); also played in K League 2
- Felipe (2020–2021 Gwangju FC); also played in K League 2
- Willyan (2020 Gwangju FC, 2023–2025 FC Seoul, 2025 Suwon FC); also played in K League 2
- Gustavo Vintecinco (2020 Busan IPark); also played in K League 2
- Murilo Henrique (2020 Jeonbuk Hyundai Motors, 2021–2023 Suwon FC)
- Jonatan Reis (2020 Busan IPark)
- Gustavo (2020–2023 Jeonbuk Hyundai Motors)
- Gustavo Custódio (2020 Incheon United)
- Victor Andrade (2021 Suwon FC)
- Reis (2021 & 2025 Gwangju FC, 2023–2024 Jeju United); also played in K League 2
- Gabriel Barbosa (2021 FC Seoul)
- Barros Tardeli (2021 Suwon FC)
- Bruno Lamas (2021–2022 & 2025 Daegu FC); also played in K League 2
- Ricardo Silva (2022 FC Seoul)
- Zeca (2022 Daegu FC, 2023 Pohang Steelers)
- Leonardo (2022 Ulsan Hyundai)
- Daniel Penha (2022–2023 Daegu FC)
- Hernandes Rodrigues (2022–2023 Incheon United, 2024–2025 Jeonbuk Hyundai Motors, 2025 Daejeon Hana Citizen); also played in K League 2
- **Jefferson Galego** (2022–2024 Gangwon FC, 2024 Jeju United, 2026–present Bucheon FC 1995); also played in K League 2
- **Rodrigo Bassani** (2023 Suwon Samsung Bluewings, 2026–present Bucheon FC 1995); also played in K League 2
- Marcos Serrato (2023 Daegu FC)
- Lucas Barcellos (2023–2024 Daegu FC)
- Oberdan (2023–2025 Pohang Steelers, 2026 Jeonbuk Hyundai Motors)
- Luan Ferreira (2023 Suwon FC)
- Rafael Silva (2023 Jeonbuk Hyundai Motors)
- André Luis (2023 Jeonbuk Hyundai Motors); also played in K League 2
- **Tiago Orobó** (2023 Daejeon Hana Citizen, 2024–present Jeonbuk Hyundai Motors); also played in K League 2
- **Leandro Ribeiro** (2023–2024 Daejeon Hana Citizen, 2026–present Incheon United); also played in K League 2
- Thomás Bedinelli (2023 Gwangju FC)
- Sandro Lima (2023 Gwangju FC); also played in K League 2
- Yuri (2023–2025 Jeju SK)
- Hugo Gomes (2023 Suwon FC)
- Walterson (2023 Suwon FC); also played in K League 2
- **Victor Bobsin** (2023–2024 Daegu FC, 2024–present Daejeon Hana Citizen)
- **Vitor Gabriel** (2023–2025 Gangwon FC, 2026–present Bucheon FC 1995)
- Welinton Júnior (2023–2024 Gangwon FC)
- **Yago Cariello** (2023–2024 Gangwon FC, 2024–present Ulsan HD)
- Werik Popó (2023 Suwon Samsung Bluewings)
- **Jorge Teixeira** (2024–present Pohang Steelers); also played in K League 2
- Kelvin (2024 Ulsan HD, 2024–2025 Daejeon Hana Citizen)
- Matheus Sales (2024 Ulsan HD)
- Matheus Trindade (2024 Suwon FC)
- Andrigo (2024–2025 Jeonbuk Hyundai Motors, 2025 Suwon FC); also played in K League 2
- Marcus Vinicius (2024 Jeonbuk Hyundai Motors)
- **Anderson Oliveira** (2024–2025 Suwon FC, 2025–present FC Seoul)
- **Italo** (2024–present Jeju SK)
- Tales (2024 Jeju United); also played in K League 2
- Farley Rosa (2024 Daejeon Hana Citizen)
- Caio Marcelo (2024–2025 Daegu FC); also played in K League 2
- Bruno Oliveira (2024–2025 Gwangju FC, 2025 Gangwon FC)
- Gabriel Tigrão (2024–2025 Gwangju FC)
- João Magno (2024 Gwangju FC)
- Ítalo (2024 Daegu FC); also played in K League 2
- **Lucas Rodrigues** (2024–present FC Seoul)
- **Juninho Rocha** (2025–present Pohang Steelers); also played in K League 2
- **Bruno Mota** (2025–present FC Anyang, 2026–present Jeonbuk Hyundai Motors); also played in K League 2
- Eduardo (2025 FC Anyang)
- **Matheus Oliveira** (2025–present FC Anyang); also played in K League 2
- Yago (2025 FC Anyang); also played in K League 2
- **Erick Farias** (2025–present Ulsan HD)
- Evandro (2025 Jeju SK)
- Denílson (2025 Jeju SK)
- Luan Dias (2025 Suwon FC); also played in K League 2
- Jatobá (2025 Daegu FC); also played in K League 2
- Geovani (2025 Daegu FC); also played in K League 2
- **Pedrinho** (2025 Jeju SK, 2026–present Ulsan HD); also played in K League 2
- **João Victor** (2025–present Daejeon Hana Citizen)
- **Diogo Oliveira** (2026–present Daejeon Hana Citizen)
- **Breno Herculano** (2026–present FC Anyang)
- **Emerson Negueba** (2026–present Jeju SK)
- **Patrick William** (2026–present Bucheon FC 1995)
- **Thiaguinho Santos** (2026–present Bucheon FC 1995); also played in K League 2
- **Airton** (2026–present FC Anyang)
- **João Pedro** (2026–present Gwangju FC)
- **Matheus Aiás** (2026–present Jeju SK)
- **Italo** (2026–present Jeonbuk Hyundai Motors)
- **Gustavo Nescau** (2026–present Bucheon FC 1995)
- **Dodô** (2026–present Jeonbuk Hyundai Motors)

=== Chile ===
- José Luis Villanueva (2007 Ulsan Hyundai)
- Hugo Droguett (2012 Jeonbuk Hyundai Motors, 2014 Jeju United)
- Josepablo Monreal (2024 Suwon FC); also played in K League 2

=== Colombia ===
- Harry Castillo (2000 Suwon Samsung Bluewings, 2000–2003 Busan I'Cons, 2004 Seongnam Ilhwa Chunma, 2006 Gyeongnam FC)
- Tommy Mosquera (2003 Busan I'Cons)
- Milton Rodríguez (2005–2006 Jeonbuk Hyundai Motors)
- Mauricio Molina (2009–2010 Seongnam Ilhwa Chunma, 2011–2015 FC Seoul)
- Carmelo Valencia (2010 Ulsan Hyundai)
- Julián Estiven Vélez (2010–2012 Ulsan Hyundai, 2014 Jeju United)
- Mauricio Mendoza (2011 Gyeongnam FC)
- Javier Reina (2011 Jeonnam Dragons, 2012–2013 & 2015 Seongnam Ilhwa Chunma)
- Wilmar Jordán (2011–2012 Gyeongnam FC, 2013 Seongnam Ilhwa Chunma)
- Anderson Plata (2013 Daejeon Citizen)
- César Arias (2013 Daejeon Citizen)
- Manuel Palacios (2020–2022 Pohang Steelers, 2022 Seongnam FC); also played in K League 2
- **Leonardo Acevedo** (2026–present FC Seoul); also played in K League 2 ※ **Dual citizen** of Colombia and Portugal
- Jhon Montaño (2026 Bucheon FC 1995); also played in K League 2

=== Ecuador ===
- Energio Díaz (1996 Jeonnam Dragons)

=== Paraguay ===
- José Ortigoza (2010 Ulsan Hyundai)

=== Uruguay ===
- Arsenio Luzardo (1992–1993 LG Cheetahs)
- Nestor Correa (2000 Jeonbuk Hyundai Motors, 2002 Jeonnam Dragons)
- Yari Silvera (2000–2001 & 2003 Bucheon SK)
- Juan Manuel Olivera (2006 Suwon Samsung Bluewings)
- Federico Laens (2013 Seongnam Ilhwa Chunma)

=== Venezuela ===
- Matías Lacava (2025 Ulsan HD)
