= 2004 Copa do Brasil finals =

2004 Copa do Brasil Finals
- Event: 2004 Copa do Brasil
Santo André	Flamengo
(São Paulo (state))	(Rio de Janeiro (state))
4	2

First leg
Santo André	Flamengo
2	2
- Date: June 24, 2004
- Venue: Estádio Palestra Itália, São Paulo
- Referee: Wilson de Souza Mendonça (PE)
- Attendance: 20,994

Second leg
Flamengo	Santo André
0	2
- Date: June 30, 2004
- Venue: Maracanã Stadium, Rio de Janeiro
- Referee: Carlos Eugênio Simon (RS)
- Attendance: 71,988

The 2004 Copa do Brasil Finals was a two-legged Brazilian football that determinate the 2004 Copa do Brasil champion. It was played on June 24 and 30. It was contested by Santo André, the 2003 Copa Estado de São Paulo winners and 2003 Campeonato Brasileiro Série C runners-up, and Flamengo, whose last success had come in the 2001 Copa dos Campeões.

Santo André won the finals by a 4–2 aggregate scoreline.

== Road to the Finals ==
Santo André
Opponent	Venue	Score	Aggregate
(Goiás) Novo Horizonte	Away	5 - 0	5–0
(Goiás) Novo Horizonte	Home	was not necessary	5–0
(Minas Gerais) Atlético Mineiro	Home	3 – 0	3–2
(Minas Gerais) Atlético Mineiro	Away	0 – 2	3–2
(São Paulo (state)) Guarani	Away	1 – 1	1–1 (Santo André won on away goals)
(São Paulo (state)) Guarani	Home	0 – 0	1–1 (Santo André won on away goals)
(São Paulo (state)) Palmeiras	Home	3 – 3	7–7 (Santo André won on away goals)
(São Paulo (state)) Palmeiras	Away	4 – 4	7–7 (Santo André won on away goals)
(Rio Grande do Sul) 15 de Novembro	Home	3 – 4	6–5
(Rio Grande do Sul) 15 de Novembro	Away	3 – 1	6–5

Flamengo
Opponent	Venue	Score	Aggregate
(Alagoas) CRB	Away	4 – 4	7–5
(Alagoas) CRB	Home	3 – 1	7–5
(Minas Gerais) Tupi	Away	3 – 2	7–2
(Minas Gerais) Tupi	Home	4 – 0	7–2
(Pernambuco) Santa Cruz	Away	1 – 0	2–0
(Pernambuco) Santa Cruz	Home	1 – 0	2–0
(Porto Alegre) Grêmio	Away	1 – 0	1–0
(Porto Alegre) Grêmio	Home	0 – 0	1–0
(Bahia) Vitória	Away	1 – 0	3–0
(Bahia) Vitória	Home	2 – 0	3–0

== First leg ==
June 24
21:45

Santo André	2–2	Flamengo
Osmar 51'; Romerito 59'		Roger Guerreiro 25'; Athirson 83'

Estádio Palestra Itália
Attendance: 20,994
Referee: Wilson de Souza Mendonça (PE / FIFA)

GK	(Brazil) Júlio César
DF	(Brazil) Alex Bruno
DF	(Brazil) Gabriel
DF	(Brazil) Da Guia	(substituted off) 69'
DF	(Brazil) Dedimar
MF	(Brazil) Ramalho
MF	(Brazil) Romerito
MF	(Brazil) Xavier Dirceu
MF	(Brazil) Elvis	(substituted off) 80'
FW	(Brazil) Osmar	(substituted off) 76'
FW	(Brazil) Sandro Gaúcho
Substitutes:
DF	(Brazil) Diego Padilha	(substituted on) 69'
MF	(Brazil) Barbieri	(substituted on) 80'
FW	(Brazil) Rafael Baiano	(substituted on) 76'
Coach:
(Brazil) Péricles Chamusca

GK	(Brazil) Júlio César
DF	(Brazil) Fabiano Eller
DF	(Brazil) Felipe
DF	(Brazil) André Bahia
DF	(Brazil) Reginaldo Araújo
MF	(Poland) Roger Guerreiro	(substituted off) 69'
MF	(Brazil) Ibson
MF	(Brazil) Da Silva	(substituted off) 45'
MF	(Brazil) Douglas Silva
FW	(Brazil) Jean
Substitutes:
DF	(Brazil) Athirson	(substituted on) 69'
MF	(Brazil) Robson	(substituted on) 45'
FW	(Brazil) Diogo	(substituted on) 57'
Coach:
(Brazil) Abel Braga

== Second leg ==
June 30
21:45

Flamengo	0–2	Santo André
		Sandro Gaúcho 52'; Elvis 67'

Maracanã Stadium
Attendance: 71,988
Referee: Carlos Eugênio Simon (RS / FIFA)

GK	(Brazil) Júlio César
DF	(Brazil) Fabiano Eller
DF	(Brazil) Felipe
DF	(Brazil) André Bahia	Booked
DF	(Brazil) Reginaldo Araújo
MF	(Brazil) Robson	(substituted off) 10'
MF	(Poland) Roger Guerreiro	(substituted off) 60'
MF	(Brazil) Ibson
MF	(Brazil) Da Silva
MF	(Brazil) Douglas Silva	(substituted off) 60'
FW	(Brazil) Jean	Booked
Substitutes:
DF	(Brazil) Athirson	(substituted on) 60'
FW	(Brazil) Jônatas	(substituted on) 10'
FW	(Brazil) Negreiros	(substituted on) 60'
Coach:
(Brazil) Abel Braga

GK	(Brazil) Júlio César	Booked
DF	(Brazil) Nelsinho	(substituted off) 62'
DF	(Brazil) Alex Bruno	Booked
DF	(Brazil) Gabriel
DF	(Brazil) Dedimar
MF	(Brazil) Ramalho	(substituted off) 83'
MF	(Brazil) Romerito
MF	(Brazil) Xavier Dirceu	Booked
MF	(Brazil) Elvis	(substituted off) 75'
FW	(Brazil) Osmar
FW	(Brazil) Sandro Gaúcho
Substitutes:
MF	(Brazil) Ronaldo da Silva	(substituted on) 83'
DF	(Brazil) Da Guia	(substituted on) 62'
MF	(Brazil) Dodô	(substituted on) 75'
Coach:
(Brazil) Péricles Chamusca

== See also ==
- 2004 Campeonato Brasileiro Série A
