= 1994 K League =

Hite Cup Korean League
- Season: 1994
- Dates: 26 March – 12 November 1994
- Champions: Ilhwa Chunma (2nd title)
- Asian Club Championship: Ilhwa Chunma
- Matches: 105
- Goals: 296 (2.82 per match)
- Best Player: Ko Jeong-woon
- Top goalscorer: Yoon Sang-chul (21 goals)
- Best goalkeeper: Valeri Sarychev

The 1994 Korean League was the twelfth season of K League since its establishment in 1983.

== Foreign players ==
Team	Player 1	Player 2	Player 3	Former player (s)
Daewoo Royals	(Argentina) Rubén Rossi	(Bosnia and Herzegovina) Amir Teljigović	(Federal Republic of Yugoslavia) Željko Simović	(Argentina) Rubén Bernuncio (Argentina) Walter Perazzo
Chonbuk Buffalo				
Hyundai Horang-i	(Brazil) Maurício	(Brazil) Ronaldo	(Federal Republic of Yugoslavia) Goran Jevtić	(Brazil) Pires
Ilhwa Chunma	(Federal Republic of Yugoslavia) Đorđe Vasić	(Federal Republic of Yugoslavia) Nebojša Maksimović	(Tajikistan) Valeri Sarychev	
LG Cheetahs	(Federal Republic of Yugoslavia) Boro Janičić	(Federal Republic of Yugoslavia) Jovan Šarčević	(Federal Republic of Yugoslavia) Željko Bajčeta	(Russia) Aleksei Sudarikov (Russia) Yevgeny Zhirov
POSCO Atoms	(Brazil) Ricardo	(Brazil) Silvan	(Federal Republic of Yugoslavia) Rade Bogdanović	
Yukong Elephants	(Hungary) Attila Kámán	(Hungary) József Somogyi	(Russia) Aleksandr Podshivalov	

== League table ==
Pos	Team	Pld	W	D	L	GF	GA	GD	Pts	Qualification
1	Ilhwa Chunma (C)	30	15	9	6	42	30	+12	54	Qualification for the Asian Club Championship
2	Yukong Elephants	30	14	9	7	47	31	+16	51	
3	POSCO Atoms	30	13	11	6	49	37	+12	50	
4	Hyundai Horang-i	30	11	13	6	38	30	+8	46	
5	LG Cheetahs	30	12	7	11	53	50	+3	43	
6	Daewoo Royals	30	7	6	17	37	56	−19	27	
7	Chonbuk Buffalo	30	3	5	22	30	62	−32	14	

Source: RSSSF
(C) Champions

== Awards ==
=== Main awards ===
Award	Winner	Club
Most Valuable Player	(South Korea) Ko Jeong-woon	Ilhwa Chunma
Top goalscorer	(South Korea) Yoon Sang-chul	LG Cheetahs
Top assist provider	(South Korea) Ko Jeong-woon	Ilhwa Chunma
Rookie of the Year	(South Korea) Choi Yong-soo	LG Cheetahs
Manager of the Year	(South Korea) Park Jong-hwan	Ilhwa Chunma
Best Defender/Goalkeeper	(Tajikistan) Valeri Sarychev	Ilhwa Chunma
Fighting Spirit Award	(South Korea) Lee Kwang-jong	Yukong Elephants
Exemplary Award	(South Korea) Chung Jong-soo	Hyundai Horang-i
Best Referee	(South Korea) Park Hae-yong	—

=== Best XI ===
Position	Winner	Club
Goalkeeper	(Tajikistan) Valeri Sarychev	Ilhwa Chunma
Defenders	(South Korea) An Ik-soo	Ilhwa Chunma
Defenders	(South Korea) Yoo Sang-chul	Hyundai Horang-i
Defenders	(South Korea) Hong Myung-bo	POSCO Atoms
Defenders	(South Korea) Huh Ki-tae	Yukong Elephants
Midfielders	(South Korea) Hwangbo Kwan	Yukong Elephants
Midfielders	(South Korea) Shin Tae-yong	Ilhwa Chunma
Midfielders	(South Korea) Ko Jeong-woon	Ilhwa Chunma
Forwards	(South Korea) Yoon Sang-chul	LG Cheetahs
Forwards	(Federal Republic of Yugoslavia) Rade Bogdanović	POSCO Atoms
Forwards	(South Korea) Kim Kyung-rae	Chonbuk Buffalo

== See also ==
- 1994 Korean League Cup
