= 1996 Korean League Cup =

1996 Adidas Cup
Tournament details
- Country: South Korea
- Dates: 30 March – 28 April 1996
- Teams: 9

Final positions
- Champions: Bucheon Yukong (2nd title)
- Runners-up: Pohang Atoms

Tournament statistics
- Matches played: 36
- Goals scored: 86 (2.39 per match)
- Top goal scorer(s): Lee Won-shik; Sergey Burdin (5 goals each)

The 1996 Korean League Cup, also known as the Adidas Cup 1996, was the sixth competition of the Korean League Cup.

== Table ==
Pos	Team	Pld	W	D	L	GF	GA	GD	Pts
1	Bucheon Yukong (C)	8	5	2	1	18	7	+11	17
2	Pohang Atoms	8	3	3	2	8	8	0	12
3	Busan Daewoo Royals	8	3	3	2	7	10	−3	12
4	Ulsan Hyundai Horang-i	8	3	2	3	10	8	+2	11
5	Cheonan Ilhwa Chunma	8	3	2	3	11	11	0	11
6	Suwon Samsung Bluewings	8	3	2	3	8	10	−2	11
7	Jeonbuk Hyundai Dinos	8	2	3	3	8	8	0	9
8	Anyang LG Cheetahs	8	2	3	3	8	10	−2	9
9	Jeonnam Dragons	8	1	2	5	8	14	−6	5

Source: RSSSF
(C) Champions

== Matches ==
March 30
15:00 UTC+9

Ulsan Hyundai Horang-i	1–2	Suwon Samsung Bluewings
Kim Jong-keon 73'		Park Kun-ha 15', 28'

Ulsan Sports Complex
Attendance: 21,350

March 30
15:00 UTC+9

Busan Daewoo Royals	1–1	Jeonbuk Hyundai Dinos
Manić 46'		Parakhnevych 4'

Busan Gudeok stadium
Attendance: 18,215

March 31
15:30 UTC+9

Pohang Atoms	2–2	Jeonnam Dragons
Bogdanović 26'; Hwang Sun-hong 64'		Oh Kyung-seok 76', 78'

Steelyard Stadium
Attendance: 21,875

March 31
15:00 UTC+9

Anyang LG Cheetahs	0–0	Bucheon Yukong

Daejeon Sports Complex
Attendance: 15,428

April 3
19:00 UTC+9

Suwon Samsung Bluewings	0–1	Busan Daewoo Royals
		Manić 20' (pen.)

Suwon Civil Stadium
Attendance: 16,100

April 3
16:00 UTC+9

Jeonbuk Hyundai Dinos	0–0	Pohang Atoms

Jeonju Stadium
Attendance: 13,782

April 4
16:00 UTC+9

Bucheon Yukong	3–2	Cheonan Ilhwa Chunma
Lee Won-shik 76', 86'; Kwon Tae-kyu 79'		Park Nam-yeol 13'; Shin Tae-yong 65'

Taebaek Stadium
Attendance: 13,250

April 4
15:30 UTC+9

Jeonnam Dragons	2–3	Anyang LG Cheetahs
Kim In-wan 19'; Roh Sang-rae 80'		Skachenko 6', 55'; Choi Yong-soo 65'

Gwangyang Football Stadium
Attendance: 8,136

April 6
15:00 UTC+9

Busan Daewoo Royals	0–0	Ulsan Hyundai Horang-i

Changwon Civil Stadium
Attendance: 13,576

April 6
15:30 UTC+9

Pohang Atoms	2–1	Suwon Samsung Bluewings
Bogdanović 16'; Hwang Sun-hong 88' (pen.)		Cho Hyun-doo 54'

Steelyard Stadium
Attendance: 12,503

April 7
15:00 UTC+9

Anyang LG Cheetahs	0–4	Jeonbuk Hyundai Dinos
		Kim Do-hoon 7', 38' (pen.), 61' (pen.); Parakhnevych 40'

Anyang Stadium
Attendance: 23,252

April 7
15:00 UTC+9

Cheonan Ilhwa Chunma	2–0	Jeonnam Dragons
Shin Tae-yong 58' (pen.); Nonković 90+1'

Cheonan Stadium
Attendance: 36,415

April 10
19:00 UTC+9

Suwon Samsung Bluewings	2–2	Anyang LG Cheetahs
Cho Hyun-doo 72'; Park Kun-ha 92'		Obeid 57' (pen.); Skachenko 67'

Suwon Civil Stadium
Attendance: 14,200

April 10
19:00 UTC+9

Ulsan Hyundai Horang-i	1–2	Pohang Atoms
Kim Jong-keon 14'		Park Tae-ha 32'; Hwang Sun-hong 65'

Ulsan Sports Complex
Attendance: 11,198

April 10
15:30 UTC+9

Jeonnam Dragons	1–4	Bucheon Yukong
Kim Tae-young 72'		Yoon Jung-hwan 19'; Burdin 32'; Somogyi 69' (pen.); Lee Won-shik 75'

Gwangyang Football Stadium
Attendance: 7,000

April 10
15:00 UTC+9

Jeonbuk Hyundai Dinos	0–0	Cheonan Ilhwa Chunma

Jeonju Stadium
Attendance: 2,715

April 13
15:30 UTC+9

Pohang Atoms	0–0	Busan Daewoo Royals

Steelyard Stadium
Attendance: 10,822

April 13
15:30 UTC+9

Anyang LG Cheetahs	0–1	Ulsan Hyundai Horang-i
		Yoo Sang-chul 90'

Changwon Civil Stadium
Attendance: 15,231

April 14
15:00 UTC+9

Suwon Samsung Bluewings	0–3	Cheonan Ilhwa Chunma
		Ko Jeong-woon 2', 61'; Park Nam-yeol 82'

Suwon Civil Stadium
Attendance: 15,420

April 14
16:00 UTC+9

Bucheon Yukong	2–0	Jeonbuk Hyundai Dinos
Kwon Tae-kyu 36'; Burdin 87'

Mokdong Stadium
Attendance: 8,750

April 17
19:00 UTC+9

Ulsan Hyundai Horang-i	5–2	Cheonan Ilhwa Chunma
Đurišić 20'; Kim Hyun-seok 43' (pen.); Lim Jae-seon 66', 85'; Kim Gi-nam 81'		Ko Jeong-woon 30'; Shin Tae-yong 76' (pen.)

Ulsan Sports Complex
Attendance: 9,545

April 17
19:00 UTC+9

Busan Daewoo Royals	1–0	Anyang LG Cheetahs
Manić 33'

Busan Gudeok stadium
Attendance: 12,316

April 18
19:00 UTC+9

Suwon Samsung Bluewings	1–1	Bucheon Yukong
Cho Hyun-doo 55'		Shin Sung-hwan 76' (o.g.)

Suwon Civil Stadium
Attendance: 11,200

April 18
16:00 UTC+9

Jeonbuk Hyundai Dinos	1–3	Jeonnam Dragons
Kim Do-hoon 75'		Sidelnikov 7'; Kim Do-keun 80'; Lee Pyung-jae 86'

Iksan Stadium
Attendance: 1,675

April 20
15:00 UTC+9

Cheonan Ilhwa Chunma	2–1	Busan Daewoo Royals
Nonković 45'; Park Nam-yeol 72'		Myung Jin-young 78'

Donghae Stadium
Attendance: 13,221

April 20
15:00 UTC+9

Anyang LG Cheetahs	3–0	Pohang Atoms
Yoon Sang-chul 19', 85'; Skachenko 51'

Gumi Civil Stadium
Attendance: 24,572

April 21
15:30 UTC+9

Jeonnam Dragons	0–1	Suwon Samsung Bluewings
		Cho Hyun 75' (pen.)

Gwangyang Football Stadium
Attendance: 11,543

April 21
16:00 UTC+9

Bucheon Yukong	0–1	Ulsan Hyundai Horang-i
		Lee Hyun-seok 62'

Mokdong Stadium
Attendance: 1,500

April 24
15:00 UTC+9

Busan Daewoo Royals	2–7	Bucheon Yukong
Choi Wol-kyu 12'; Woo Sung-yong 85'		Burdin 66', 80', 87'; Lee Won-shik 67', 70'; Cha Sang-hae 77'; Yoon Jung-hwan 84'

Sokcho Stadium
Attendance: 23,567

April 24
19:00 UTC+9

Pohang Atoms	2–0	Cheonan Ilhwa Chunma
Jang Young-hoon 44'; Cho Jin-ho 59'

Steelyard Stadium
Attendance: 8,543

April 25
19:00 UTC+9

Suwon Samsung Bluewings	1–0	Jeonbuk Hyundai Dinos
Lee Kee-keun 70'

Suwon Civil Stadium
Attendance: 12,385

April 25
19:00 UTC+9

Ulsan Hyundai Horang-i	0–0	Jeonnam Dragons

Ulsan Sports Complex
Attendance: 8,124

April 28
16:00 UTC+9

Bucheon Yukong	1–0	Pohang Atoms
Yoon Jung-chun 43'

Mokdong Stadium
Attendance: 12,382

April 28
15:00 UTC+9

Cheonan Ilhwa Chunma	0–0	Anyang LG Cheetahs

Masan Stadium
Attendance: 15,122

April 28
15:00 UTC+9

Jeonbuk Hyundai Dinos	2–1	Ulsan Hyundai Horang-i
Choi Jin-cheul 60'; Jang Cheol-min 66'		Ahn Hong-min 50'

Jeonju Stadium
Attendance: 4,576

April 28
15:30 UTC+9

Jeonnam Dragons	0–1	Busan Daewoo Royals
		Choi Wol-kyu 64'

Gwangyang Football Stadium
Attendance: 8,257

== Awards ==
Award	Player	Team	Points
Top goalscorer	(South Korea) Lee Won-shik	Bucheon Yukong	5 goals
Top assist provider	(South Korea) Yoon Jong-hwan	Bucheon Yukong	3 assists

== See also ==
- 1996 in South Korean football
- 1996 K League
- 1996 Korean FA Cup
