= Jirov =

Jirov may refer to:

- Zhirov, a Russian surname
- Jírov, traditional Czech name for a location in the Czech Republic that was also historically called Jurau in German
- Jirov, a village in Corcova, Mehedinți County, Romania
