= Kim Kyung-rae =

South Korean footballer (born 1964)

Kim Kyung-rae 김경래
Personal information
- Full name: Kim Kyung-rae
- Date of birth: March 18, 1964 (age 62)
- Place of birth: South Korea
- Height: 1.73 m (5 ft 8 in)
- Position: Forward

Youth career
- 1984–1987: Myongji University

Senior career*
Years	Team	Apps	(Gls)
1988–1993	Daewoo Royals	59	(0)
1994	Jeonbuk Buffalo	29	(10)
1995–1997	Jeonbuk Hyundai Dinos	44	(2)

International career
1987	South Korea U-17		
- * Club domestic league appearances and goals

- Kim Kyung-rae
- Hangul: 김경래
- Hanja: 金京來
- RR: Gim Gyeongrae
- MR: Kim Kyŏngnae

Kim Kyung-rae (Korean: 김경래; born March 18, 1964) is a South Korean former footballer who played as a forward.

He started professional career at Daewoo Royals in 1988.

He was winner of K League Best XI in 1994 K League.
