= Rolandas =

Rolandas is a masculine Lithuanian given name and may refer to:

- Rolandas Alijevas (born 1985), Lithuanian basketball player
- Rolandas Baravykas (born 1995), Lithuanian footballer
- Rolandas Bernatonis (born 1987), Lithuanian handball player
- Rolandas Džiaukštas (born 1978), Lithuanian footballer
- Rolandas Gimbutis (born 1981), Lithuanian swimmer
- Rolandas Jasevičius (born 1982), Lithuanian boxer
- Rolandas Karčemarskas (born 1980), Lithuanian footballer
- Rolandas Kazlas (born 1969), Lithuanian actor and theater director
- Rolandas Maščinskas (born 1992), Lithuanian rower
- Rolandas Muraška (born 1973), Lithuanian tennis player
- Rolandas Paksas (born 1956), Lithuanian politician and President of Lithuania
- Rolandas Paulauskas (born 1954), Lithuanian journalist and politician
- Rolandas Pavilionis (1944–2006), Lithuanian philosopher and politician
- Rolandas Urbonas, Lithuanian paralympic athlete
- Rolandas Verkys (born 1966), Lithuanian high jumper
