= Karčemarskas =

Karčemarskas is a Lithuanian surname. Notable people with the surname include:

- Rolandas Karčemarskas (born 1980), Lithuanian footballer
- Žydrūnas Karčemarskas (born 1983), Lithuanian footballer
