= Tešić =

Tešić (Serbian Cyrillic: Тешић) is a Serbian surname. It may refer to:

- Igor Tešić (born 1988), Serbian beach volleyball player
- Nađa Tešić (1939–2014), Serbian-American writer, filmmaker, actress and activist
- Saša Tešić (born 1969), Serbian footballer
- Steve Tesich (1942–1996), Serbian-American screenwriter

== See also ==
- Tešović, surname
