= Ljubiša Ranković =

Serbian footballer

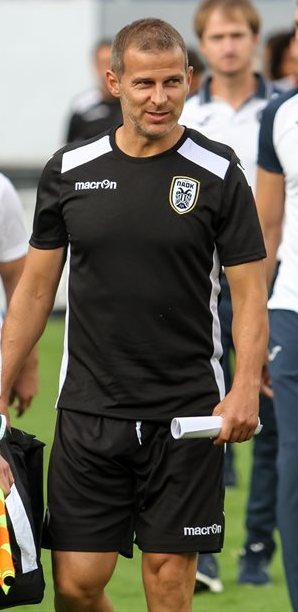
- Ranković with PAOK in 2017

Personal information
- Full name: Ljubiša Ranković
- Date of birth: 10 December 1973 (age 52)
- Place of birth: Valjevo, SFR Yugoslavia
- Height: 1.71 m (5 ft 7 in)
- Position: Midfielder

Senior career*
| Years | Team | Apps | (Gls) |
| 1994–1995 | Rad | 34 | (9) |
| 1995–1996 | Ilhwa Chunma | 12 | (0) |
| 1997–2003 | Partizan | 71 | (6) |
| 2002 | → Sichuan Dahe (loan) | 21 | (3) |
| 2003 | → Zemun (loan) | 14 | (0) |
| 2003–2005 | Caen | 38 | (1) |
| 2005 | Metalurh Zaporizhzhia | 5 | (0) |
| 2006 | Sète | 8 | (1) |
| Total | | 203 | (20) |

Managerial career
- 2008–2014: Partizan (team secretary)
- 2015–2016: Dinamo Minsk (assistant)
- 2016–2017: Partizan (assistant)
- 2017: PAOK (assistant)
- 2017–2018: Partizan (assistant)
- 2018: Serbia (assistant)
- 2018–2020: Al Dhafra (assistant)
- * Club domestic league appearances and goals

Ljubiša Ranković (Serbian Cyrillic: Љубиша Ранковић; born 10 December 1973) is a Serbian former footballer who played as a midfielder who is the assistant manager of Saudi Arabian club Al-Fayha.

== Playing career ==
After playing for Rad in the First League of FR Yugoslavia over one and a half seasons, Ranković was transferred abroad to South Korean club Ilhwa Chunma in October 1995, helping the team win the K League in November and the Asian Club Championship in December of that year. He later made 12 appearances in the 1996 K League and five appearances in the 1996 Korean League Cup.

Following his stint in Asia, Ranković joined Partizan in early 1997. He spent seven seasons with the Crno-beli, including loan spells to Chinese club Sichuan Dahe in 2002, as well as to fellow Serbian club Zemun in 2003. Subsequently, Ranković moved abroad to France and joined Ligue 2 side Caen. He helped them earn promotion to Ligue 1 in his first season at the club. However, as they immediately suffered relegation from the top flight, Ranković left the country and signed for Ukrainian club Metalurh Zaporizhzhia in the summer of 2005. He returned to French football six months later and joined Ligue 2 club Sète, before hanging up his boots in 2006.

== Post-playing career ==
After retiring from the game, Ranković was a member of technical staff at his former club Partizan for seven years until December 2014, before joining Belarusian side Dinamo Minsk as assistant manager to Dušan Uhrin Jr. ahead of the 2015 season. He was brought to the club by newly appointed director of football Vuk Rašović. After Rašović replaced Uhrin as manager, Ranković remained serving as an assistant. He returned to Partizan in August 2016, becoming assistant manager to Marko Nikolić. In June 2017, Ranković joined Aleksandar Stanojević in Greece as his assistant at PAOK. He rejoined Partizan in October 2017 to assist Miroslav Đukić. In April 2018, Ranković became assistant manager to Mladen Krstajić with the Serbia national team, less than two months ahead of the 2018 World Cup. He also continued to assist Đukić at Partizan until the end of the season. In June 2018, it was announced that Ranković would be joining Vuk Rašović as an assistant at Emirati club Al Dhafra.

== Honours ==
Ilhwa Chunma

- K League: 1995
- Asian Club Championship: 1995

Partizan

- First League of FR Yugoslavia: 1996–97, 1998–99
- FR Yugoslavia Cup: 1997–98, 2000–01
