= Nenad Nonković =

Serbian footballer

Personal information
- Date of birth: 1 October 1970 (age 56)
- Place of birth: SFR Yugoslavia
- Height: 1.78 m (5 ft 10 in)
- Position: Midfielder

Youth career
- Red Star Belgrade

Senior career*
| Years | Team | Apps | (Gls) |
| 1990-1991 | Mačva Šabac | 16 | (0) |
| 1992-1993 | Borac Banja Luka | 25 | (2) |
| 1994-1995 | Obilić | 21 | (1) |
| 1996 | Ilhwa Chunma | 12 | (1) |
| 1996-1997 | → Mouscron (loan) | 0 | (0) |
| 1997-1998 | Waregem | 0 | (0) |
| 1999 | TPV | 2 | (0) |
| 2000 | Obilić | 6 | (0) |
- * Club domestic league appearances and goals

Nenad Nonković (born 1 October 1970) is a Serbian former professional footballer who played as a midfielder.

== Club career ==
He was part of the 1992-93 Borac Banja Luka squad, the only Bosnian club who joined the First League of FR Yugoslavia in its inaugural season,

In October 1995, Nonković joined K League side Ilhwa Chunma with Ljubiša Ranković.

In November 1996, Nonković joined a Belgian side on loan

He also played for Tampereen Pallo-Veikot.

== Honours ==
Ilhwa Chunma

- K League 1: 1995
- Asian Club Championship: 1995
