= 1994 Korean League Cup =

1994 Adidas Cup
Tournament details
- Country: South Korea
- Dates: 21 May – 11 June 1994
- Teams: 7

Final positions
- Champions: Yukong Elephants (1st title)
- Runners-up: LG Cheetahs

Tournament statistics
- Matches played: 21
- Goals scored: 51 (2.43 per match)
- Top goal scorer(s): Rade Bogdanović; Im Jae-sun (4 goals each)

The 1994 Korean League Cup, also known as the Adidas Cup 1994, was the fourth competition of the Korean League Cup.

== Table ==
Pos	Team	Pld	W	D	L	GF	GA	GD	Pts
1	Yukong Elephants (C)	6	3	2	1	11	7	+4	11
2	LG Cheetahs	6	3	2	1	7	5	+2	11
3	Daewoo Royals	6	2	3	1	8	5	+3	9
4	Ilhwa Chunma	6	2	2	2	4	3	+1	8
5	Hyundai Horang-i	6	1	3	2	7	8	−1	6
6	Chonbuk Buffalo	6	2	0	4	7	15	−8	6
7	POSCO Atoms	6	1	2	3	7	8	−1	5

Source: RSSSF
(C) Champions

== Matches ==
May 21
15:30 UTC+9

POSCO Atoms	1–2	LG Cheetahs
Bogdanović 48'		Choi Yong-soo 22'; Yoo Dong-gwan 21' (o.g.)

Gwang-Yang Stadium
Attendance: 7,000

May 21
15:00 UTC+9

Yukong Elephants	1–1	Daewoo Royals
Hwangbo Kwan 38' (pen.)		Jeong Gwang-seok 14'

Dongdaemun Stadium
Attendance: 1,530

May 21
17:00 UTC+9

Chonbuk Buffalo	0–3	Hyundai Horang-i
		Lim Jae-seon 44', 68'; Ronaldo 71'

Jeonju Stadium
Attendance: 1,100

May 25
19:00 UTC+9

Hyundai Horang-i	1–2	Ilhwa Chunma
Lim Jae-seon 2'		Park Gwang-hyun 65'; Ha Sung-jun 80'

Ulsan Sports Complex
Attendance: 975

May 25
19:00 UTC+9

POSCO Atoms	1–2	Daewoo Royals
Lee Won-cheol 4'		Rossi 21'; Kim Gwi-hwa 53'

Steelyard Stadium
Attendance: 4,700

May 25
19:00 UTC+9

LG Cheetahs	3–1	Chonbuk Buffalo
Yun Sang-cheol 48', 57', 82'		Ju Gyeong-cheol 60'

Dongdaemun Stadium
Attendance: 450

May 28
15:00 UTC+9

LG Cheetahs	1–1	Hyundai Horang-i
Lee In-jae 73'		Choi Dong-ho 69'

Gongju Stadium
Attendance: 12,000

May 28
17:00 UTC+9

Chonbuk Buffalo	1–3	Yukong Elephants
Yoo Seung-gwan 22'		Kim Gi-seon 39'; Lee Gwang-jong 55'; Lim Gi-han 84'

Jeonju Stadium
Attendance: 2,000

May 28
16:00 UTC+9

Ilhwa Chunma	0–0	POSCO Atoms

Pyeongtaek Stadium
Attendance: 3,300

June 1
19:00 UTC+9

Yukong Elephants	2–0	LG Cheetahs
Hwangbo Kwan 59'; Kim Gi-seon 65'

Dongdaemun Stadium
Attendance: 2,500

June 1
19:00 UTC+9

Daewoo Royals	0–0	Ilhwa Chunma

Busan Gudeok stadium
Attendance: 3,000

June 1
19:00 UTC+9

POSCO Atoms	4–1	Chonbuk Buffalo
Seo Hyo-won 13'; Bogdanović 43', 63', 76'		Kim Gyeong-rae 44'

Steelyard Stadium
Attendance: 16,000

June 4
15:00 UTC+9

Hyundai Horang-i	0–0	POSCO Atoms

Ulsan Sports Complex
Attendance: 3,000

June 4
15:00 UTC+9

Ilhwa Chunma	2–0	Yukong Elephants
Oh Dong-cheon 29'; Shin Tae-yong 38'

Dongdaemun Stadium
Attendance: 3,500

June 4
15:00 UTC+9

Daewoo Royals	2–3	Chonbuk Buffalo
Kim Gwi-hwa 23' (pen.); Ryu Ung-ryeol 44'		Baek Song 4', 66'; Mun Yeong-rae 25' (pen.)

Busan Gudeok stadium
Attendance: 2,000

June 8
19:00 UTC+9

Daewoo Royals	3–0	Hyundai Horang-i
Lee Gi-geun 17'; Kim Gwi-hwa 34' (pen.); Cho Deok-je 78'

Busan Gudeok stadium
Attendance: 750

June 8
17:00 UTC+9

Ilhwa Chunma	0–1	LG Cheetahs
		Kim Sang-jin 59'

Dongdaemun Stadium
Attendance: 3,000

June 8
19:00 UTC+9

Yukong Elephants	3–1	POSCO Atoms
Hwangbo Kwan 38'; Kim Sang-mun 46'; Jo Seong-hwan 90'		Lee Won-cheol 42'

Dongdaemun Stadium
Attendance: 3,850

June 11
15:00 UTC+9

LG Cheetahs	0–0	Daewoo Royals

Dongdaemun Stadium
Attendance: 1,000

June 11
15:00 UTC+9

Hyundai Horang-i	2–2	Yukong Elephants
Lim Jae-seon 38'; Shin Yon-ho 68'		Kim Gi-seon 2'; Lee Chan-haeng 37'

Ulsan Sports Complex
Attendance: 2,500

June 11
15:00 UTC+9

Chonbuk Buffalo	1–0	Ilhwa Chunma
Baek Song 32'

Jeonju Stadium
Attendance: 1,000

== Awards ==
Award	Player	Team	Points
Top goalscorer	(South Korea) Im Jae-sun	Hyundai Horang-i	4 goals
Top assist provider	(South Korea) Cho Jung-hyun	Yukong Elephants	4 assists

== See also ==
- 1994 K League
