= Zentai (disambiguation) =

Zentai is a term for skin-tight garments that cover the entire body.

Zentai may also refer to:

- A former administrative division in the Kingdom of Hungary, usually Zenta; Senta is now in Serbia
  - Battle of Zenta

== Surname ==
Hungarian ancestry

- Charles Zentai (1921–2017), suspected war criminal
- Ferenc Zentai, tennis player
- Lajos Zentai, football player
- László Zentai, author
- Máté Zentai, MMA fighter

Other

- Huang Zen-Tai, former president of Soochow University
