= Benatti =

Benatti is an Italian surname. Notable people with the surname include:

- Andrea Benatti (born 1979), Italian rugby union player
- Oreste Benatti (1906–?), Italian footballer
- Renato Netson Benatti (born 1981), Brazilian footballer

== See also ==
- Benetti (surname)
