= Saša Tešić =

Serbian footballer (1969–2020)

Personal information
- Full name: Saša Tešić
- Date of birth: 7 March 1969
- Place of birth: Belgrade, SFR Yugoslavia
- Date of death: 15 January 2020 (aged 50)
- Position: Centre back

Youth career
- 1981–1988: Radnički Vršac

Senior career*
Years	Team	Apps	(Gls)
1988–1995	Radnički Vršac		
1995	Borac Čačak		
1995–1998	Bor		
1998–1999	Priština	18	(5)
2009–2010	Vršac United		
- * Club domestic league appearances and goals

Saša Tešić (Serbian Cyrillic: Саша Тешић; 7 March 1969 – 15 January 2020) was a Serbian footballer.

== Club career ==
=== Radnički Vršac ===
Tešić's first professional club was Radnički Vršac. He played 10 years for club from Vršac where he live most of his life. His coach was Ilija Radak.

=== Borac Čačak ===
In First League of FR Yugoslavia team Borac Čačak Tešić didn't got opportunities to play, and he decided to join FK Bor soon.

=== Bor ===
In 1995 Tešić joined FK Bor. He played for this team from 1995 to 1998. While at this Eastern Serbian club, Tešić made promotion to Second League, and the club were contenders for the Serbian SuperLiga but were not promoted.

=== Priština ===
In FK Priština, Tešić played his last season (1998-99) that the club spent in the top league in the First League of FR Yugoslavia. Despite being a centre back, Tešić was the second top scorer of the club, behind Nemanja Dančetović. He even made a hat-trick in a win against Mogren.

=== Vršac United ===
After a 10-year break, Tešić decided in 2009 to accept his friend's appeals to help local club, to get promotion to one league system up.

== Personal life ==
Tešić was married to Tatjana. His son Danilo (born 2001), also trained football in the same club Vršac United. He died in 2020, aged 50.

== Honours and awards ==
Bor

- Gold Badge of the Bor Municipality: 1997
