= Im Jae-sun =

South Korean footballer (born 1968)

Im Jae-Sun
Personal information
- Full name: Im Jae-Sun
- Date of birth: June 10, 1968 (age 58)
- Height: 1.80 m (5 ft 11 in)
- Position: Forward

Youth career
- 1995–1998: University of Incheon

Senior career*
Years	Team	Apps	(Gls)
1991	LG Cheetahs	3	(0)
1991–1996	Hyundai Horangi/ Ulsan Hyundai	112	(16)
1997	Chunnam Dragons	10	(1)
1998	Cheon Ilhwa Chunma	1	(0)

International career
1992–1993	South Korea	0	(0)
- * Club domestic league appearances and goals

Im Jae-Sun (born June 10, 1968) is a South Korean footballer. He was Top Scorer in 1994 Korean League Cup.
