= 1995 K League =

Hite Cup Korean League
- Season: 1995
- Dates: Regular season: 6 May – 25 October 1995; Championship: 4–18 November 1995
- Champions: Ilhwa Chunma (3rd title)
- Asian Club Championship: Ilhwa Chunma; Pohang Atoms
- Cup Winners' Cup: Hyundai Horang-i
- Matches played: 112
- Goals scored: 263 (2.35 per match)
- Best Player: Shin Tae-yong
- Top goalscorer: Roh Sang-rae (15 goals)

The 1995 Korean League was the 13th season of K League since its establishment in 1983.

== Regular season ==
=== First stage ===
Pos	Team	Pld	W	D	L	GF	GA	GD	Pts	Qualification
1	Ilhwa Chunma	14	10	3	1	23	8	+15	33	Qualification for the playoffs
2	Hyundai Horang-i	14	7	5	2	21	10	+11	26	Qualification for the Cup Winners' Cup (Note: Qualified as champions of the League Cup.)
3	Pohang Atoms	14	7	5	2	18	12	+6	26	
4	Daewoo Royals	14	5	3	6	16	19	−3	18	
5	Yukong Elephants	14	4	4	6	14	16	−2	16	
6	Jeonnam Dragons	14	4	2	8	19	22	−3	14	
7	Jeonbuk Dinos	14	4	0	10	10	23	−13	12	
8	LG Cheetahs	14	2	4	8	12	23	−11	10	

Source: RSSSF

=== Second stage ===
Pos	Team	Pld	W	D	L	GF	GA	GD	Pts	Qualification
1	Pohang Atoms	14	8	5	1	23	11	+12	29	Qualification for the playoffs and the Asian Club Championship (Note: Ilhwa Chunma won the 1995 Asian Club Championship, and qualified for the next season as defending champions. Therefore, Pohang Atoms also qualified for the 1996–97 Asian Club Championship.)
2	Yukong Elephants	14	5	5	4	14	14	0	20	
3	Hyundai Horang-i	14	4	7	3	14	11	+3	19	
4	Jeonbuk Dinos	14	5	4	5	17	19	−2	19	
5	Jeonnam Dragons	14	4	5	5	18	17	+1	17	
6	LG Cheetahs	14	3	6	5	17	20	−3	15	
7	Ilhwa Chunma	14	3	6	5	13	17	−4	15	Qualification for the Asian Club Championship
8	Daewoo Royals	14	4	2	8	14	21	−7	14	

Source: RSSSF

== Championship playoffs ==
Team 1	Agg.	Team 2	1st leg	2nd leg	Replay
Ilhwa Chunma (C)	5–4	Pohang Atoms	1–1	3–3	1–0 (a.e.t.)

== Awards ==
=== Main awards ===
Award	Winner	Club
Most Valuable Player	(South Korea) Shin Tae-yong	Ilhwa Chunma
Top goalscorer	(South Korea) Roh Sang-rae	Jeonnam Dragons
Top assist provider	(Bosnia and Herzegovina) Amir Teljigović	Daewoo Royals
Rookie of the Year	(South Korea) Roh Sang-rae	Jeonnam Dragons
Manager of the Year	(South Korea) Park Jong-hwan	Ilhwa Chunma
Special Award	(South Korea) Kim Byung-ji	Hyundai Horang-i

=== Best XI ===
Position	Winner	Club
Goalkeeper	(Tajikistan) Valeri Sarychev	Ilhwa Chunma
Defenders	(South Korea) Choi Young-il	Hyundai Horang-i
Defenders	(South Korea) Hong Myung-bo	Pohang Atoms
Defenders	(South Korea) Huh Ki-tae	Yukong Elephants
Midfielders	(South Korea) Ko Jeong-woon	Ilhwa Chunma
Midfielders	(South Korea) Kim Hyun-seok	Hyundai Horang-i
Midfielders	(South Korea) Shin Tae-yong	Ilhwa Chunma
Midfielders	(Bosnia and Herzegovina) Amir Teljigović	Daewoo Royals
Midfielders	(South Korea) Kim Pan-keun	LG Cheetahs
Forwards	(South Korea) Hwang Sun-hong	Pohang Atoms
Forwards	(South Korea) Roh Sang-rae	Jeonnam Dragons

== See also ==
- 1995 K League Championship
- 1995 Korean League Cup
