= Zhirov =

Zhirov (Russian: Жи́ров) is a Russian male surname. Its feminine counterpart is Zhirova. The surname is derived from the word жир (zhir, meaning "fat") and may refer to:

- Vassiliy Jirov (born 1974), Kazakh boxer
- Aleksandr Zhirov (1958–1983), Soviet alpine skier
- Aleksandr Zhirov (born 1991), Russian footballer
- Andrei Zhirov (born 1971), Russian footballer and coach
- Nikolay Zhirov, Soviet bobsledder
- Nikolai Zhirov (1903-1970), Russian chemist primarily known for his monographs Atlantida about Atlantis
- Yevgeny Zhirov, Russian footballer
- Marina Zhirova (born 1963), Russian sprinter
