= Đorđe Vasić =

Serbian footballer and coach

Personal information
- Date of birth: 2 May 1964 (age 62)
- Place of birth: Obrenovac, SFR Yugoslavia
- Height: 1.86 m (6 ft 1 in)
- Position: Midfielder

Senior career*
Years	Team	Apps	(Gls)
1984–1989	OFK Beograd		
1989–1994	Rad	139	(11)
1994	Ilhwa Chunma	8	(0)
1996-1997	Nea Salamis Famagusta	24	(1)

Managerial career
- 2013: Serbia U19 (asst.)
- 2013: Bežanija (asst.)
- 2015: Sinđelić (asst.)
- 2016: Čukarički (asst.)
- 2017: Rad (asst.)
- 2019-2020: Al-Ahli (Head of academy)
- * Club domestic league appearances and goals

Đorđe Vasić (born 2 May 1964) is a Serbian football coach and former player who played as a midfielder.

== Career ==
Vasić played for OFK Beograd and Rad in his homeland Yugoslavia. In 1994, Vasić joined K League side Ilhwa Chunma. He later also played in China and Cyprus.

After retiring as a player, he became a coach and worked in several clubs in Serbia, mostly as an assistant to Gordan Petrić. He was also the assistant coach of Ljubinko Drulović in the Serbian under-19 team, when they became European champions in 2013.

== Honours ==
Ilhwa Chunma

- K League 1: 1994
