= Sérgio (footballer, born 1975) =

Brazilian footballer

Personal information
- Full name: Sérgio Ricardo dos Santos Vieira
- Date of birth: 28 May 1975 (age 51)
- Place of birth: Brazil
- Height: 1.78 m (5 ft 10 in)
- Position: Forward

Senior career*
| Years | Team | Apps | (Gls) |
| ? | ? | ? | (?) |
| 2001 | → Anyang LG Cheetahs (loan) | 13 | (2) |
| ? | ? | ? | (?) |
- * Club domestic league appearances and goals as of 15 August 2011

Sérgio Ricardo dos Santos Vieira, shortly Sergio (born 28 Man 1975) is a Brazilian footballer, who played as a forward.

== Club career ==
He played many clubas in Belgium and Portugal and he played for FC Seoul in K League 2003
