= Osmar (footballer, born 1980) =

Brazilian footballer

Personal information
- Full name: Osmar Aparecido de Azevedo
- Date of birth: March 27, 1980 (age 46)
- Place of birth: Marília, Brazil
- Height: 1.74 m (5 ft 9 in)
- Position: Striker

Youth career
- 1997–1999: Rio Branco-SP

Senior career*
| Years | Team | Apps | (Gls) |
| 2000 | Rio Branco-SP | | |
| 2000 | União Mogi | | |
| 2001–2003 | União São João | 15 | (4) |
| 2004 | Santo André | 21 | (8) |
| 2004–2009 | Palmeiras | 37 | (21) |
| 2005 | → Grêmio (loan) | 4 | (0) |
| 2005 | → Morelia (loan) | 14 | (4) |
| 2006 | → Oita Trinita (loan) | 11 | (3) |
| 2006 | → Fortaleza (loan) | 5 | (0) |
| 2007 | → Ipatinga (loan) | | |
| 2008 | → Vitória (loan) | 5 | (0) |
| 2010 | União São João | | |
| 2010 | Americana | | |
| 2011 | Marília | | |
| 2011 | União São João | | |
| 2012 | Marília | | |
- * Club domestic league appearances and goals

Osmar Aparecido de Azevedo or simply Osmar (born March 27, 1980), is a Brazilian former professional footballer who played as a striker. He is also known in his native Brazil by the nickname Cambalhota ("Backflip").

== Career statistics ==
| Club performance | | | League | |
| Season | Club | League | Apps | Goals |
| Brazil | | | League | |
|---|---|---|---|---|
| 2004 | Palmeiras | Série A | 18 | 11 |
| 2005 | Palmeiras | Série A | 4 | 1 |
| 2005 | Grêmio | Série B | 0 | 0 |
| Mexico | | | League | |
| 2005/06 | Monarcas Morelia | Primera División | 13 | 3 |
| Japan | | | League | |
| 2006 | Oita Trinita | J1 League | 11 | 3 |
| Brazil | | | League | |
| 2006 | Fortaleza | Série A | 5 | 0 |
| 2007 | Palmeiras | Série A | 1 | 1 |
| 2008 | Ipatinga | Série A | 0 | 0 |
| 2009 | Ipatinga | Série B | | |
| Country | Brazil | | 28 | 13 |
| Country | Mexico | | 13 | 3 |
| Country | Japan | | 11 | 3 |
| Total | | | 52 | 19 |

== Honours ==
Santo André

- Brazilian Cup: 2004

Grêmio

- Brazilian Série B: 2005

Palmeiras

- Campeonato Paulista: 2008
