= Nelsinho =

Nelsinho may refer to:

- Nelsinho (footballer, born 1945), Brazilian footballer
- Nelsinho Baptista (born 1950), former Brazilian football right back and manager.
- Nelson Santana (1955–1964), Brazilian venerable boy
- Nelsinho (footballer, born 1979), Portuguese footballer
- Nelson Piquet Jr. (born 1985), Brazilian racing driver, son of Nelson Piquet.
- Nelsinho (footballer, born 1988), Brazilian footballer
