= 1995 K League Championship =

- Event: 1995 K League
Ilhwa Chunma	Pohang Atoms
5	4
- on aggregate

First leg
Ilhwa Chunma	Pohang Atoms
1	1
- Date: 5 November 1995
- Venue: Dongdaemun Stadium, Seoul

Second leg
Pohang Atoms	Ilhwa Chunma
3	3
- Date: 11 November 1995
- Venue: Pohang Steel Yard, Pohang

Replay
Pohang Atoms	Ilhwa Chunma
0	1
- Date: 19 November 1995
- Venue: Anyang Sports Complex, Anyang

The 1995 K League Championship was the third competition of the K League Championship, and was held to decide the 13th champions of the K League. It was contested between winners of two stages of the regular season. It was going to be played over two legs, but a rematch was added because the aggregate score was tied.

== Qualified teams ==
Club	Placement
Ilhwa Chunma	First stage winners
Pohang Atoms	Second stage winners

== First leg ==
5 November 1995

Ilhwa Chunma	1–1	Pohang Atoms
Han Jung-kook 13'		Bogdanović 21'

Dongdaemun Stadium, Seoul

== Second leg ==
11 November 1995

Pohang Atoms	3–3	Ilhwa Chunma
Hwang Sun-hong 12', 31'; Bogdanović 87'		Shin Tae-yong 57', 65' (pen.); Ko Jeong-woon 85'

Pohang Steel Yard, Pohang

== Replay ==
19 November 1995

Ilhwa Chunma	1–0 (a.e.t.)	Pohang Atoms
Lee Sang-yoon 104'

Anyang Sports Complex, Anyang

== See also ==
- 1995 K League
