= Petr Gottwald =

Czech footballer (born 1973)

Personal information
- Full name: Petr Gottwald
- Date of birth: 28 April 1973 (age 53)
- Place of birth: Prostějov
- Height: 1.72 m (5 ft 8 in)
- Position: Forward

Senior career*
Years	Team	Apps	(Gls)
?	?	?	(?)
1998	Jeonbuk Dinos	4	(0)
?	?	?	(?)
?	?	1	(0)
- * Club domestic league appearances and goals

Petr Gottwald (born 28 April 1973) is a Czech professional footballer who plays as an offensive midfielder.

== Club career ==
Gottwald has played for several Czech and Austrian football clubs, and in 1998 played for the Jeonbuk Dinos in South Korea's K League.

== Enternal links ==
- Petr Gottwald – K League stats at kleague.com (in Korean and English)
