= Rémerson =

Brazilian footballer

Personal information
- Full name: Rémerson dos Santos
- Date of birth: July 13, 1972 (age 54)
- Place of birth: Barra Mansa, Rio de Janeiro, Brazil
- Position: Central defender

Youth career
- 1988: Portuguesa (SP)
- 1989: Jacarei (SP)

Senior career*
Years	Team	Apps	(Gls)
1990–95	Bragantino		
1996–97	Chapecoense		
1997	Joinville		
1997	Santa Cruz		
1998	Sampaio Corrêa		
1999	Joinville		
1999–2000	Ulsan Hyundai	27	(1)
2001	Marcílio Dias		
2001	Tiradentes de Tijucas		
2002	Marcílio Dias		
2002	Náutico		
- * Club domestic league appearances and goals as of 30 September 2005

Rémerson dos Santos, shortly Rémerson (born July 13, 1972 in Barra Mansa, Rio de Janeiro) is a Brazilian footballer who plays as a central defender for Náutico.

== Honours ==
- Campeonato Paulista in 1990 with Bragantino
- Campeonato Catarinense in 1996 with Chapecoense
- Campeonato Pernambucano in 2002 with Náutico
