= Dedimar =

Brazilian footballer (born 1976)

Personal information
- Full name: Dedimar Souza Lima
- Date of birth: 27 January 1976 (age 50)
- Place of birth: Irecê, Brazil
- Height: 1.77 m (5 ft 9 1/2 in)
- Position: Defender

Senior career*
| Years | Team | Apps | (Gls) |
| 1992–1996 | Vitória | | |
| 1996–1997 | Juventude | | |
| 1997 | Palmeiras | | |
| 1997–1998 | Atlético Mineiro | | |
| 1998 | Júbilo Iwata | | |
| 1999–2000 | Coritiba | | |
| 2000–2003 | Etti Jundiai | | |
| 2003–2005 | Santo André | | |
| 2006 | Tokyo Verdy | | |
| 2006–2007 | Marília | | |
| 2007 | São Caetano | | |
| 2007 | Santo André | | |
| 2008 | Juventus | | |
| 2008 | Santo André | | |

International career
| 1995 | Brazil U-20 | | |

Managerial career
- 2013: Paulista
- 2013–2014: Santo André
- * Club domestic league appearances and goals

Dedimar Souza Lima (born 27 January 1976) is a Brazilian former professional footballer and manager who is currently a youth scout for Palmeiras.

== Club statistics ==
| Club performance | | | League | | Cup | | League Cup | | Continental | | Total | |
| Season | Club | League | Apps | Goals | Apps | Goals | Apps | Goals | Apps | Goals | Apps | Goals |
| Japan | | | League | | Emperor's Cup | | J.League Cup | | Asia | | Total | |
|---|---|---|---|---|---|---|---|---|---|---|---|---|
| 1998 | Júbilo Iwata | J1 League | 4 | 1 | 2 | 2 | 0 | 0 | - | | 6 | 3 |
| 2006 | Tokyo Verdy | J2 League | 8 | 0 | 0 | 0 | - | | 1 | 0 | 9 | 0 |
| Career total | | | 12 | 1 | 2 | 2 | 0 | 0 | 1 | 0 | 15 | 3 |
