= Simao Costa =

Portuguese footballer

Personal information
- Full name: Simao Pedro Goncalves de Figueiredo Costa
- Date of birth: 7 September 1975 (age 51)
- Place of birth: Portugal
- Height: 1.72 m (5 ft 7 1/2 in)
- Position: Midfielder

Senior career*
Years	Team	Apps	(Gls)
2001	Daejeon Citizen	5	(0)
- * Club domestic league appearances and goals

Simao Pedro Goncalves de Figueiredo Costa (born 7 September 1975) is a Portuguese retired footballer who played as a midfielder.

== Club career ==
He played mainly for Portuguese football clubs, as well as for Daejeon Citizen in South Korean in 2001.
