= Ramalho (footballer, born 1980) =

Brazilian footballer

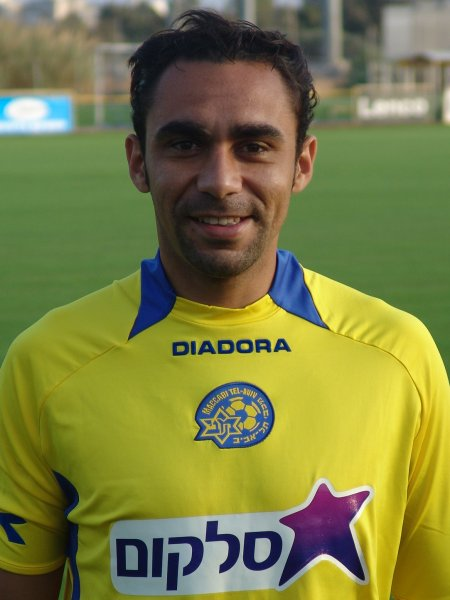

Personal information
- Full name: José Ramalho Carvalho de Freitas
- Date of birth: June 3, 1980 (age 46)
- Place of birth: Natal, Brazil
- Height: 1.77 m (5 ft 9 1/2 in)
- Position: Defensive midfielder

Team information
- Current team: Sergipe

Youth career
- 1995–1996: Santo André

Senior career*
Years	Team	Apps	(Gls)
1997–2004	Santo André		
2002–2003	→ Vitória (loan)		
2004–2007	São Paulo		
2005–2006	→ Santo André (loan)		
2006–2007	→ Beitar Jerusalem (loan)		
2007–2008	Maccabi Tel Aviv		
2008–2009	Goiás		
2010–2011	Atlético Goianiense		
2011	Criciúma		
2012	Rio Verde		
2012	Atlético Sorocaba		
2013–2015	Santo André		
2015	→ São Caetano (loan)		
2016	Paulista		
2016	ASA		
2018–	Sergipe		
- * Club domestic league appearances and goals as of 17 July 2008

José Ramalho Carvalho de Freitas, or simply Ramalho (born June 3, 1980 in Natal), is a Brazilian defensive midfielder.

He joined Beitar Jerusalem, of Israel, where he played with two other Brazilians of that team, Cléber Schwenck and Tuto Ruschel, and was signed as a replacement for another Brazilian, Joeano Pinto Chaves.
