= Barbieri (footballer) =

Brazilian footballer (born 1979)

Personal information
- Full name: Jorge Luiz Barbieri
- Date of birth: May 1, 1979 (age 47)
- Place of birth: João Pessoa, Brazil
- Height: 1.75 m (5 ft 9 in)
- Position: Attacking midfielder

Senior career*
Years	Team	Apps	(Gls)
- Vitória
- São Paulo FC
- Etti Jundiaí-SP
- Figueirense
- Marília
- Cianorte
- Santo André
- ADAP
2005	Ulsan Hyundai	2	(0)
2005–07	ADAP		
2007	Ceará		
- * Club domestic league appearances and goals as of 27 April 2007

Jorge Luiz Barbieri (born May 1, 1979), or simply Barbieri, is a Brazilian footballer who plays as an offensive midfielder. His previous clubs include ADAP, Ulsan Hyundai in South Korea, Santo André, Cianorte, Marília, Figueirense, Etti Jundiaí, São Paulo FC, Vitória and Ceará.
