= Zoran Đurišić =

Serbian footballer

Zoran Đurišić Зоран Ђуришић
Personal information
- Full name: Zoran Đurišić
- Date of birth: 29 April 1971 (age 55)
- Place of birth: Novi Sad, SR Serbia, SFR Yugoslavia
- Height: 1.83 m (6 ft 0 in)
- Position: Forward

Senior career*
Years	Team	Apps	(Gls)
1995	Novi Sad		
1996	Hyundai Horang-i	19	(3)
1997–1998	Debrecen	29	(11)
1998	Videoton	8	(1)
2000	Ashdod	3	(0)
2002	Novi Sad		
Total		59	(15)
- * Club domestic league appearances and goals

Zoran Đurišić (Serbian Cyrillic: Зоран Ђуришић; born 29 April 1971) is a Serbian retired footballer who played as a forward.

== Career ==
In 1996, Đurišić joined K League side Hyundai Horang-i, helping them win the title. He later spent some time playing in Hungary and Israel.

== Honours ==
Hyundai Horang-i

- K League: 1996
