= Lajos Zentai =

Hungarian footballer (born 1966)

Lajos
Personal information
- Full name: Lajos Zentai
- Date of birth: 2 August 1966 (age 60)
- Place of birth: Hungary
- Height: 1.83 m (6 ft 0 in)
- Position: Defender

Senior career*
Years	Team	Apps	(Gls)
1987–1990	Vasas SC	15	(1)
1991–1992	LG Cheetahs	23	(1)
1992–1993	Vasas SC	6	(0)
1993–1994	BVSC Budapest	10	(1)
1993–1994	Eger		
- * Club domestic league appearances and goals

Lajos Zentai, shortly Zentai (born August 2, 1966) is a Hungarian footballer who played as a defender.

== Club career ==
He played for FC Seoul of the South Korean K League, then known as LG Cheetahs.
