= Silvan (Brazilian footballer) =

Brazilian footballer (born 1973)

Personal information
- Full name: Silvan Lopes Lichtenecker
- Date of birth: 20 July 1973
- Place of birth: Brazil
- Position: Midfielder

Senior career*
| Years | Team | Apps | (Gls) |
| 1991–1996 | Sport Club Internacional | | |
| 1992 | → Ypiranga (loan) | | |
| 1994-1995 | → POSCO Atoms (loan) | 34 | (2) |
- * Club domestic league appearances and goals

Silvan Lopes Lichtenecker (born 20 July 1973) was a Brazilian football player.

== Club career ==
He mainly played for clubs in Brazil.

He also played for Pohang Steelers of the South Korean K League, then known as the POSCO Atoms.
