= Da Silva (footballer, born February 1977) =

Brazilian footballer

Personal information
- Full name: Valdenir da Silva Vitalino
- Date of birth: February 21, 1977 (age 49)
- Place of birth: Barra Mansa, Brazil
- Height: 1.81 m (5 ft 11 in)
- Position: Midfielder

Youth career
- América Futebol Clube
- Fluminense

Senior career*
Years	Team	Apps	(Gls)
2001–2002	Entrerriense		
2002	Bangu		
2003–2008	Madureira		
2003	→Vasco da Gama (loan)	31	(1)
2004–2005	→ Flamengo (loan)	46	(0)
2005	→ FC Seoul (loan)	8	(0)
2006	→ Ponte Preta (loan)	7	(0)
2007–2008	→ Tokushima Vortis (loan)	65	(0)
2009	Cabofriense		
2010	Macaé	3	(0)
- * Club domestic league appearances and goals as of December 31, 2008

Valdenir da Silva Vitalino, or simply Da Silva (born February 21, 1977), is a former Brazilian midfielder.

Da Silva previously played for several Brazilian clubs including Vasco da Gama and Flamengo in the Campeonato Brasileiro. He also spent his career at the Korean club FC Seoul and the Japanese soccer club Tokushima Vortis.

== Club statistics ==
Club performance			League		Cup		Total	
Season	Club	League	Apps	Goals	Apps	Goals	Apps	Goals
Japan			League		Emperor's Cup		Total	
2007	Tokushima Vortis	J2 League	35	0	2	0	37	0
2008	Tokushima Vortis	J2 League	30	0	1	0	31	0
Country	Japan		65	0	3	0	68	0
Total			65	0	3	0	68	0
