= Nemanja Dančetović =

Serbian footballer

Personal information
- Full name: Nemanja Dančetović
- Date of birth: 25 July 1973 (age 53)
- Place of birth: Pristina, SR Serbia, SFR Yugoslavia
- Height: 1.78 m (5 ft 10 in)
- Position: Midfielder

Senior career*
Years	Team	Apps	(Gls)
1991–1995	Priština	45+	(1+)
1995–1997	Čukarički	18	(0)
1996	→ Radnički Kragujevac (loan)		
1997–1999	Priština	44	(15)
1999–2000	Milicionar	35	(10)
2000	Ulsan Hyundai Horang-i	6	(0)
2001	Enköpings SK	4	(0)
2001–2002	Radnički Obrenovac		
2002	Sutjeska Nikšić	6	(0)
2003	Patraikos	12	(1)
2003	Srem		
2004–2005	Radnički Obrenovac		
2005–2006	BASK		
2006–2007	Hajduk Beograd		
2007–2008	Mladost Lučani	0	(0)
2009–2010	Radnički Niš	9	(0)
2016	Hajduk Beograd		
Total		179+	(27+)
- * Club domestic league appearances and goals

Nemanja Dančetović (Serbian Cyrillic: Немања Данчетовић; born 25 July 1973) is a Serbian former professional footballer who played as a midfielder.

== Career ==
During his journeyman career, Dančetović played for numerous clubs, making his debut with Priština in the 1991–92 Yugoslav Second League. He later spent two seasons at Čukarički from 1995 to 1997, including a loan spell with Radnički Kragujevac, before returning to Priština.

After scoring 10 goals for Milicionar in the 1999–2000 First League of FR Yugoslavia, Dančetović went abroad to Ulsan Hyundai Horang-i and made six appearances during the 2000 K League. He also briefly played with Enköpings SK, appearing in four games in the 2001 Superettan.

In 2007, Dančetović joined newly promoted Serbian SuperLiga side Mladost Lučani, but made just one appearance in the 2007–08 Serbian Cup. He later played for Radnički Niš during the 2009–10 Serbian First League, as the club suffered relegation.

In early 2016, at the age of 42, Dančetović came out of retirement to play for his former club Hajduk Beograd in the Belgrade Zone League, the fourth tier of Serbian football.

== Honours ==
Hajduk Beograd

- Serbian League Belgrade: 2006–07
