= Renato (footballer, born 1981) =

Brazilian footballer

Personal information
- Full name: Renato Netson Benatti
- Date of birth: 17 October 1981 (age 45)
- Place of birth: Bento Gonçalves, Brazil
- Height: 1.88 m (6 ft 2 in)
- Position: Centre back

Youth career
- Esportivo
- 1995–2001: Juventude

Senior career*
Years	Team	Apps	(Gls)
2002–2004	Juventude	36	(0)
2003–2004	→ Almería (loan)	6	(0)
2004	Criciúma	1	(0)
2005	Brasiliense	4	(0)
2006	Naval	0	(0)
2007	Brasil Farroupilha		
2008	Chunnam Dragons	11	(1)
2009	CSA		
2010	Esportivo		
2010	Cianorte		
2011	Esportivo		
2012	Pelotas	3	(0)
2012	Flamengo São Valentim		
2013	Garibaldi		
2013	Brasil Farroupilha		
2014	Nova Prata		
2014	Garibaldi		

International career
2003	Brazil U23		
- * Club domestic league appearances and goals

Renato Netson Benatti (born 17 October 1981), simply known as Renato, is a Brazilian footballer who plays as a central defender.

He spent the most of his career with his native Rio Grande do Sul clubs, and played notably for Chunnam Dragons, Esporte Clube Juventude, UD Almería, Criciúma Esporte Clube and Associação Naval 1º de Maio.
