= Ricardo (footballer, born 1965) =

Brazilian footballer

Personal information
- Full name: Ricardo da Silva Costa
- Date of birth: March 24, 1965 (age 61)
- Place of birth: Lajeado, Brazil
- Height: 1.78 m (5 ft 10 in)
- Position: Defender

Senior career*
Years	Team	Apps	(Gls)
1985–1990	Caxias		
1990–1996	Internacional		
1994	→ POSCO Atoms (loan)	11	(0)
- * Club domestic league appearances and goals

Ricardo da Silva Costa (born 24 March 1965), known as just Ricardo, is a Brazilian former professional footballer who played as a defender. He spent most of his career in his native Brazil, also playing for Pohang Steelers, then known as the POSCO Atoms, of the South Korean K League.
