= Sergey Burdin =

Russian footballer

Personal information
- Full name: Sergey Nikolaevich Burdin
- Date of birth: 2 March 1970 (age 56)
- Place of birth: Perm, Russian SFSR
- Height: 1.88 m (6 ft 2 in)
- Position: Striker

Senior career*
Years	Team	Apps	(Gls)
1986–1988	Zvezda Perm	27	(6)
1988	PFC CSKA-2 Moscow	16	(3)
1989	CSKA Moscow	0	(0)
1989	PFC Chayka-CSKA Moscow	38	(6)
1990	Iskra Smolensk	22	(8)
1990	Zvezda Perm	12	(2)
1991	Tsement Novorossiysk	36	(4)
1992	Gekris Novorossiysk	33	(11)
1993–1995	Chernomorets Novorossiysk	108	(65)
1996–1997	Bucheon SK	40	(20)
1997–1998	Chernomorets Novorossiysk	25	(7)
1999–2000	Seongnam Ilhwa Chunma	25	(6)
2000	Chernomorets Novorossiysk	8	(1)
2001	FC Rubin Kazan	16	(0)
2001–2003	Gazovik-Gazprom Izhevsk	83	(14)
2004	FC Volgar-Gazprom Astrakhan	27	(5)
- * Club domestic league appearances and goals as of 1 January 2009

Sergey Nikolaevich Burdin (Russian: Сергей Николаевич Бурдин; born 2 March 1970) is a retired Russian football player. He played for Russian clubs CSKA Moscow, Chernomorets Novorossiysk, Gazovik-Gazprom Izhevsk and South Korean clubs Bucheon SK (currently Jeju United FC), Seongnam Ilhwa Chunma.

== Honours ==
- Russian First Division Zone West top scorer: 1993 (25 goals).
