= Yevgeny Zhirov =

Russian footballer (born 1969)

Personal information
- Full name: Yevgeny Nikolaevich Zhirov
- Date of birth: 10 January 1969 (age 57)
- Place of birth: USSR
- Height: 1.82 m (6 ft 0 in)
- Positions: Defender; midfielder

Senior career*
Years	Team	Apps	(Gls)
1986	Zenit Leningrad		
1987	Dynamo Leningrad		
1988	Zenit Leningrad		
1989–1990	Meliorator Kyzylorda		
1991–1994	Zhemchuzhina Sochi		
1994	LG Cheetahs	4	(0)
1996	Dynamo Sochi		
1997	Lotto-MKM Moscow		
1998	Spartak Lukhovitsy		
1998	Irtysh Omsk		
1999	Lotto-MKM Moscow		
- * Club domestic league appearances and goals

Yevgeny Nikolaevich Zhirov (Russian: Евгений Николаевич Жиров; born 10 January 1969) is a Russian former footballer. His previous clubs included Zenit Leningrad, Dynamo Leningrad, Zhemchuzhina Sochi, Irtysh Omsk, Meliorator Kyzylorda in Kazakhstan (at that time USSR) and FC Seoul of the South Korean K League, then known as LG Cheetahs.
