= 1995 Asian Club Championship =

15th edition of premier club football tournament organized by the AFC

Tournament details
- Dates: ?? 1995 – December 1995
- Teams: 28
- Venue: Riyadh (final round)

Final positions
- Champions: (South Korea) Ilhwa Chunma (1st title)
- Runners-up: (Saudi Arabia) Al-Nassr
- Third place: (Thailand) Thai Farmers Bank
- Fourth place: (Iran) Saipa

Tournament statistics
- Matches played: 50
- Goals scored: 155 (3.1 per match)

The 1995 Asian Club Championship was the 15th edition of the annual international club football competition held in the AFC region (Asia). It determined that year's club champion of association football in Asia.

Ilhwa Chunma of South Korea won the final and became Asian champions for the first time.

== First round ==
=== West Asia ===
Team 1	Agg.	Team 2	1st leg	2nd leg
FK Neftchy Farg'ona (Uzbekistan)	4–5	(Kazakhstan) Yelimay Semipalatinsk	3–1	1–4
Al-Seeb (Oman)	0–4	(Kuwait) Al-Salmiya	0–0	0–4
Al-Shabab (United Arab Emirates)	2–2 (a)	(Lebanon) Al-Ansar	2–1	0–1
Köpetdag Aşgabat (Turkmenistan)	6–2	(Kyrgyzstan) Kant-Oil Kant	6–0	0–2
Al-Zawraa (Iraq)	5–2	(Jordan) Al-Wehdat	3–1	2–1
Al-Arabi (Qatar)	bye ^{1}			
Al-Nassr (Saudi Arabia)	bye ^{2}			
Saipa (Iran)	bye ^{3}			

^{1} Al-Arabi had been drawn against the champions of Bahrain, but the Bahrainian FA did not send a team.
^{2} Al-Nasr were drawn against the champions of Palestine, but the Palestinian FA did not send a team.
^{3} Saipa were drawn against the champions of Tajikistan, but the Tajik FA did not send a team.

=== East Asia ===
Team 1	Agg.	Team 2	1st leg	2nd leg
Mohun Bagan (India)	2–2 (a)	(Maldives) Club Valencia	2–1	0–1
Verdy Kawasaki (Japan)	6–0	(Hong Kong) Eastern AA	3–0	3–0
Pasay (Philippines)	17–2	(Guam) Tumon Taivon	7–0	10–2
Persib Bandung (Indonesia)	2–1	(Thailand) Bangkok Bank FC	2–0	0–1
Crescent Textile Mills (Pakistan)	5–1	(Sri Lanka) Saunders SC	2–1	3–0^{1}
Ilhwa Chunma (South Korea)	8–0	(Macau) GD Lam Pak	5–0	3–0^{2}
Cảng Sài Gòn (Vietnam)	w/o^{3}	(Malaysia) Pahang FA		
Thai Farmers Bank FC (Thailand)	bye ^{4}			

^{1} Saunders SC withdrew after the 1st leg.
^{2} GD Lam Pak withdrew after the 1st leg.
^{3} Cảng Sài Gòn withdrew.
^{4} Thai Farmers Bank FC had been drawn against the winners of a match between the champions of China and North Korea, but neither country's FA sent a team.

== Second round ==
=== West Asia ===
Team 1	Agg.	Team 2	1st leg	2nd leg
Saipa (Iran)	4–2	(Kuwait) Al-Salmiya	2–1	2–1
Al-Ansar (Lebanon)	1–6	(Turkmenistan) Köpetdag Aşgabat	1–1	0–5
Al-Zawraa (Iraq)	3–4	(Qatar) Al-Arabi	2–1	1–3
Yelimay Semipalatinsk (Kazakhstan)	0–4	(Saudi Arabia) Al-Nassr	0–1	0–3^{1}

^{1} Yelimay Semipalatinsk withdrew after the 1st leg.

=== East Asia ===
Team 1	Agg.	Team 2	1st leg	2nd leg
Persib Bandung (Indonesia)	5–2	(Philippines) Pasay	3–1	2–1
Pahang FA (Malaysia)	2–5	(South Korea) Ilhwa Chunma	2–3	0–2
Thai Farmers Bank FC (Thailand)	7–0	(Maldives) Club Valencia	6–0	1–0
Verdy Kawasaki (Japan)	12–1	(Pakistan) Crescent Textile Mills	9–1	3–0^{1}

^{1} Crescent Textile Mills withdrew after the 1st leg.

== Quarterfinals ==
=== West Asia ===
Team	Pld	W	D	L	GF	GA	GD	Pts
(Saudi Arabia) Al-Nassr	3	2	1	0	3	1	+2	7
(Iran) Saipa	3	1	2	0	1	0	+1	5
(Qatar) Al-Arabi	3	0	2	1	3	4	−1	2
(Turkmenistan) Köpetdag Aşgabat	3	0	1	2	2	4	−2	1

All matches were played in Riyadh, Saudi Arabia.

24 November 1995

Saipa (Iran)	1–0	(Turkmenistan) Köpetdag Aşgabat

Riyadh, Saudi Arabia

24 November 1995

Al-Nassr (Saudi Arabia)	2–1	(Qatar) Al-Arabi
Ohene Kennedy 82'; Fahad Al Bishi 90+1'		Ahmed Faris 67'

King Fahd International Stadium, Riyadh
Referee: Mohd Nazri Abdullah (Malaysia)

26 November 1995

Al-Nassr (Saudi Arabia)	0–0	(Iran) Saipa

King Fahd International Stadium, Riyadh
Referee: Nabil Ayad (Lebanon)

26 November 1995

Köpetdag Aşgabat (Turkmenistan)	2–2	(Qatar) Al-Arabi

Riyadh, Saudi Arabia

28 November 1995

Saipa (Iran)	0–0	(Qatar) Al-Arabi

Riyadh, Saudi Arabia

28 November 1995

Al-Nassr (Saudi Arabia)	1–0	(Turkmenistan) Köpetdag Aşgabat
Ibrahim Al Issa 80'

King Fahd International Stadium, Riyadh
Referee: Abdullah Sayyar (Bahrain)

=== East Asia ===
Team	Pld	W	D	L	GF	GA	GD	Pts
(South Korea) Ilhwa Chunma	3	2	1	0	7	3	+4	7
(Thailand) Thai Farmers Bank FC	3	1	2	0	3	2	+1	5
(Japan) Verdy Kawasaki	3	1	1	1	3	3	0	4
(Indonesia) Persib Bandung	3	0	0	3	5	10	−5	0

All matches were played in Bandung, Indonesia.

26 November 1995

Ilhwa Chunma (South Korea)	1–1	(Thailand) Thai Farmers Bank
Shin Tae-yong 55'

26 November 1995

Verdy Kawasaki (Japan)	3–2	(Indonesia) Persib Bandung
		Kékéy Zakaria Asép Kustiana

28 November 1995

Thai Farmers Bank (Thailand)	0–0	(Japan) Verdy Kawasaki

30 November 1995

Thai Farmers Bank (Thailand)	2–1	(Indonesia) Persib Bandung
		Yudi Guntara

28 November 1995

Ilhwa Chunma (South Korea)	5–2	(Indonesia) Persib Bandung
Han Jung-kook 13' Shin Tae-yong 19' Ljubiša Ranković 24' ?' Hwang Yeon-seok 27'		Yudi Guntara Asép Kustiana

30 November 1995

Ilhwa Chunma (South Korea)	1–0	(Japan) Verdy Kawasaki
Park Nam-yeol 55'

== Knockout Stage ==
=== Bracket ===
Semi-finals
27 December – Riyadh
(South Korea) Ilhwa Chunma (a.s.d.e.t.)	1
(Iran) Saipa	0
27 December – Riyadh
(Saudi Arabia) Al-Nassr (a.s.d.e.t.)	1
(Thailand) Thai Farmers Bank	0

Final
29 December – Riyadh
(South Korea) Ilhwa Chunma (a.s.d.e.t.)	1
(Saudi Arabia) Al-Nassr	0
Third place play-off
29 December – Riyadh
(Iran) Saipa	1
(Thailand) Thai Farmers Bank	2

=== Semi-finals ===
27 December 1995

Ilhwa Chunma (South Korea)	1–0 (a.e.t./g.g.)	(Iran) Saipa
Lee Kwang-Hyun 104'

King Fahd Stadium, Riyadh, Saudi Arabia

27 December 1995

Al-Nassr (Saudi Arabia)	1–0 (a.e.t./g.g.)	(Thailand) Thai Farmers Bank
Khalid Al Farhan 99'

King Fahd International Stadium, Riyadh
Referee: Kiyoshi Ota (Japan)

=== Third placed play-off ===
29 December 1995

Saipa (Iran)	1–2	(Thailand) Thai Farmers Bank

King Fahd International Stadium, Riyadh

=== Final ===
29 December 1995

Ilhwa Chunma (South Korea)	1–0 (a.e.t./g.g.)	(Saudi Arabia) Al-Nassr
Lee Tae-Hong 110'

King Fahd International Stadium, Riyadh
Referee: Saad Kamil Al-Fadhli (Kuwait)
