= Rolandas Karčemarskas =

Lithuanian footballer (born 1980)

Personal information
- Full name: Rolandas Karčemarskas
- Date of birth: 7 September 1980 (age 46)
- Place of birth: Alytus, USSR (now Lithuania)
- Height: 1.85 m (6 ft 1 in)
- Position: Forward

Senior career*
Years	Team	Apps	(Gls)
1996	DFK Dainava Alytus		
1997–1998	FK Geležinis Vilkas		
1998	KS Polonia Vilnius	16	(2)
1998–2000	FK Žalgiris		
2000–2002	Bucheon SK	19	(4)
2003	DFK Dainava Alytus	25	(4)
2004	FK Alytis Alytus		
2005–2007	FK Vėtra		
2008	FK Alytis Alytus	39	(9)
2009	FK Centras Alytus		

International career^{‡}
1998–1999	Lithuania	2	(0)
- * Club domestic league appearances and goals as of 21 February 2011 ‡ National team caps and goals as of 21 February 2011

Rolandas Karčemarskas (born 7 September 1980 in Alytus) is a former Lithuanian footballer, who last played for FK Jelgava. He also played for Bucheon SK of the South Korean K League.

== Club career ==
He played for Jeju United of the South Korean K League, then known as Bucheon SK.
