= Amir Teljigović =

Bosnian footballer (born 1968)

Personal information
- Date of birth: 17 August 1968 (age 58)
- Place of birth: Sarajevo, SFR Yugoslavia
- Height: 1.85 m (6 ft 1 in)
- Position: Midfielder

Senior career*
Years	Team	Apps	(Gls)
1988–1992	Proleter Zrenjanin	111	(18)
1992–1994	Vojvodina	42	(5)
1994–1996	Daewoo Royals	58	(3)
1996–1997	Mladost Apatin		
1997–1998	Trelleborg	46	(3)
1999–2000	Apollon Limassol	22	(0)
2000–2002	Proleter Zrenjanin	63	(4)
2002–2005	Mladi Radnik	76	(18)

International career
1996	Bosnia and Herzegovina	1	(0)
- * Club domestic league appearances and goals

Amir Teljigović (born 17 August 1968) is a Bosnian former professional footballer who played as a midfielder. He made one appearance for the Bosnia and Herzegovina national team in 1996.

== Club career ==
Teljigović started his career in 1988 playing with FK Proleter Zrenjanin in the Yugoslav Second League. In 1990 they won promotion to the Yugoslav First League. In 1992, despite the break-up of SFR Yugoslavia, he stayed in Serbia and signed with FK Vojvodina, now playing in the First League of FR Yugoslavia.

In 1994, he moved to the South Korean K-League club Busan Daewoo Royals where he stayed for two seasons. After a short spell in Serbia with FK Mladost Apatin, he will join Swedish club Trelleborgs FF in 1997. In 1999, he moved to Cyprus and played with Apollon Limassol.

In 2000, he came back to Serbia to play with his former club Proleter, before ending his playing career playing with FK Mladi Radnik.

== International career ==
Considering he was born in Sarajevo, Teljigović was called up and appeared in one match for Bosnia and Herzegovina, a World Cup qualification match against Croatia in 1996.
