= Chonbuk Buffalo =

1994 South Korean football club

- Full name: Chonbuk Buffalo Football Club
- Founded: 1994
- Dissolved: 1994
- Ground: Jeonju Stadium
- Capacity: 30,000

Chonbuk Buffalo (Korean: 전북 버팔로) was a South Korean professional football club based in Jeonbuk. Lasting only one year in the K League, the club was the root of the Jeonbuk Hyundai Motors. However, K League and Jeonbuk Hyundai Motors officially consider Chonbuk Buffalo as a different club.

== History ==
The predecessor of Chonbuk Buffalo was established in January 1993 as Wansan Puma FC. Wansan Puma was scheduled to join the 1993 season of K League, but that was postponed for one year due to a draft boycott.

In 1994, Wansan Puma changed its name to Chonbuk Buffalo. Their one and only season in 1994 saw them gather only 14 points from their 30 matches, winning just three times and finishing last, before the club folded.
