= Donghaean derby =

Donghaean Derby 동해안 더비
- Other names: Yeongnam Derby
- Location: (South Korea) North Gyeongsang Province (Pohang), Ulsan Metropolitan City (Ulsan)
- Teams: Pohang Steelers; Ulsan HD FC
- First meeting: April 1, 1984
- Latest meeting: Pohang 3-1 Ulsan; 2024 Korean FA Cup; November 30, 2024

Statistics
- Total meetings: Total: 189
- Most wins: Pohang Steelers (68)

Donghaean Derby (Korean: 동해안 더비, lit. 'east sea coast derby' (with 'East Sea' Donghae Korean: 동해; Hanja: 東海 being the South Korean name for Sea of Japan)) is a fierce football rivalry between Pohang Steelers and Ulsan HD, two professional football clubs based in Gyeongsang Province in South Korea. It is the oldest football rivalry in the K League.

The cities of Pohang and Ulsan are geographically close east coast ports of Korea, with the former being home to Pohang Steelers owner and steelmaking giant POSCO and the latter being home to Ulsan HD owner and shipbuilding giant HD Hyundai.

== History ==
After both teams settled down in their current cities in the mid-1990s, the rivalry between the two slowly formed.

The rivalry truly started after the 1998 K League Championship, in which the two clubs met in the semifinal. In the first leg, Pohang beat Ulsan 3-2 in a thrilling match in which three goals were scored in the added minutes of the second half. In the second leg, held in the Ulsan Stadium, they were drawing 1-1, which meant Pohang were about to progress to the final, until Ulsan's goalkeeper Kim Byung-Ji scored a last-minute header after a free-kick. The goal made the aggregate score 4-4, and Ulsan eventually became the winner after Kim Byung-Ji saved Pohang's two penalties in the following penalty shoot-out.

In 2001, Kim Byung-Ji, who had been having a series of conflicts with Ulsan because the club did not let him move to Europe, moved directly to Pohang, recording the highest transfer fee in the K League at that time. His move intensified the tension between two clubs.

The two clubs met in the 2004 K League Championship semi-final where André Luiz Tavares's goal put Pohang into the final.

Four years later, they met again in the 2008 K League Championship First Round. After a goalless draw, the game continued to penalties, in which Ulsan won 4-2.

In the final round of the 2013 K League Classic season, Ulsan were top of the table coming into the final round, and Pohang needed to defeat Ulsan away from home to win the title. Kim Won-il scored the winning goal for Pohang late in injury time for the club's fifth K League title.

Pohang defeated Ulsan 3-1 in the 2024 Korea Cup final to secure their record sixth cup title.

== Venues ==
Pohang Steelers	Donghaean derby is located in South Korea	Ulsan Hyundai	
Pohang Steel Yard	Donghaean derby is located in South Korea	Ulsan Stadium	Ulsan Munsu Football Stadium
Capacity: 25,000	Donghaean derby is located in South Korea	Capacity: 19,665	Capacity: 44,102

== Players who have played for both clubs ==
- (South Korea) Choi Kang-hee (Pohang: 1983, Ulsan: 1984–1992)
- (South Korea) Chung Jong-son (Pohang: 1985, Ulsan: 1989–1994)
- (South Korea) Cho Keung-yeon (Pohang: 1985–1991, Ulsan: 1992)
- (South Korea) Yoon Deok-yeo (Ulsan: 1986–1991, Pohang: 1992)
- (South Korea) Wang Sun-jae (Pohang: 1987–1988, Ulsan: 1988–1989)
- (South Korea) Kim Byung-ji (Ulsan: 1992–2000, Pohang: 2001–2005)
- (South Korea) Kim Sang-hoon (Ulsan: 1996–2001, Pohang: 2002–2003)
- (South Korea) Lee Kil-yong (Ulsan: 1999–2002, Pohang: 2003–2004)
- (South Korea) Choi Chul-woo (Ulsan: 2000–2001, Pohang: 2002–2003)
- (South Korea) Kwon Jung-hyuk (Ulsan: 2001–2006, Pohang: 2007)
- (South Korea) Woo Sung-yong (Pohang: 2003–2004, Ulsan: 2007–2008)
- (South Korea) Oh Beom-seok (Pohang: 2003–2007, 2020–present Ulsan: 2009–2010)
- (South Korea) Lee Jin-ho (Ulsan: 2003–2011, Pohang: 2010(loan))
- (South Korea) Kim Jin-yong (Ulsan: 2004–2005, Pohang: 2012)
- (South Korea) Kim Jee-Hyuk (Ulsan: 2005–2007, Pohang: 2008–2011)
- (South Korea) Lee Won-Jae (Pohang: 2005–2007, Ulsan: 2009–2010, Pohang: 2010–2012)
- (South Korea) Yang Dong-hyen (Ulsan: 2005–2008, 2014–2015, Pohang: 2016–2017)
- (South Korea) Go Seul-ki (Pohang: 2005–2009, Ulsan: 2010–2012)
- (South Korea) Choi Tae-uk (Pohang: 2006–2007, Ulsan: 2014)
- (South Korea) Lee Jae-won (Ulsan: 2006–2007, 2014, Pohang: 2015–2016)
- (South Korea) Kim Ji-min (Ulsan: 2007, Pohang: 2008)
- (Brazil) Brasília (Ulsan: 2008, Pohang: 2009)
- (Brazil) Almir (Ulsan: 2008–2009, Pohang: 2010)
- (South Korea) No Byung-jun (Pohang: 2008–2013, Ulsan: 2010(loan))
- (South Korea) Seol Ki-hyeon (Pohang: 2010, Ulsan: 2011)
- (South Korea) Lee Gi-dong (Pohang: 2010–2011, Ulsan: 2011)
- (South Korea) Choi Jae-soo (Ulsan: 2010–2012, Pohang: 2015)
- (South Korea) Sin Jin-ho (Pohang: 2011–2015, 2021–present Ulsan: 2019–2021)
- (South Korea) Park Sung-ho (Pohang: 2012–2013, 2015 Ulsan: 2016)
- (South Korea) Yoo Jun-soo (Ulsan: 2014–2018, Pohang: 2019)
- (South Korea) Jung Jae-yong (Ulsan: 2016–2019, Pohang: 2019)
- (South Korea) Shin Hyung-min (Pohang: 2008–2012, Ulsan: 2021–2022)
- (South Korea) Kim Seong-ju (Ulsan: 2018, Pohang: 2021)
- (South Korea) Kim Min-hyeok (Pohang: 2018, Ulsan: 2022–present)
- (South Korea) Kim In-sung (Ulsan: 2016–2021, Pohang: 2023–present)
- (South Korea) Sim Sang-min (Pohang: 2019–2023, Ulsan: 2024–present)
- (South Korea) Kim Ju-hwan (Pohang: 2020–2022, Ulsan: 2024–present)
- (South Korea) Lee Dong-hee (Ulsan: 2021, Pohang: 2024–present)

== Match reports ==
=== League matches ===
#	Date	Round	Home team	Score	Away team	Goals (Home)	Goals (Away)	Attendance
1	1 April 1984		POSCO	1–1	Hyundai	Shin Sang-keun (2)	Baek Jong-chul (8)	
2	19 May 1984		POSCO	0–2	Hyundai		Landsbergen (28), Baek Jong-chul (77)	
3	29 July 1984		POSCO	2–1	Hyundai	Choi Soon-ho (6), Lee Kil-yong (69)	Alhassan (78)	
4	29 August 1984		POSCO	3–4	Hyundai	Choi Soon-ho (9), Zeze (30), Choi Sang-kook (55)	Landsbergen (15, 77), Kim Han-bong (39), Baek Jong-chul (67)	
5	27 April 1985		Hyundai	1–2	POSCO	Landsbergen (85)	Lee Heung-sil (34), Cho Keung-yeon (41)	
6	26 June 1985		POSCO	0–0	Hyundai			
7	1 September 1985		Hyundai	0–2	POSCO		Schacht (30), Lee Heung-sil (82)	
8	20 March 1986		POSCO	1–1	Hyundai	Cho Keung-yeon (49)	Ham Hyun-gi (2)	
9	13 April 1986		Hyundai	0–0	POSCO			
10	22 October 1986		POSCO	0–3	Hyundai		Kim Jong-hwan (72), Ham Hyun-gi (75, 79)	
11	9 November 1986		Hyundai	1–0	POSCO	Ham Hyun-gi (61)		
12	28 March 1987		Hyundai	2–2	POSCO	Lee Sang-chul (33), Jung Dong-bok (43)	Choi Sang-kook (71, 84)	
13	29 March 1987		Hyundai	1–1	POSCO	Lee Sang-chul (47)	Lee Heung-sil (49)	
14	3 May 1987		POSCO	2–0	Hyundai	Lee Heung-sil (12), Kang Tae-sik (48)		
15	4 May 1987		POSCO	2–3	Hyundai	Lee Kee-keun (63, 70)	Kim Sam-soo (8), Lee Sang-chul (20), Kim Jong-kun (62)	
16	15 August 1987		POSCO	2–2	Hyundai	Choi Sang-kook (26), Choi Soon-ho (43)	Lim Ko-seok (66, 86)	
17	17 August 1987		POSCO	4–2	Hyundai	Kim Hong-woon (10, 24), Kim Moon-kyung (o.g. 40), Choi Soon-ho (67)	Jung Dong-bok (27), Baek Jong-chul (64)	
18	19 September 1987		Hyundai	3–4	POSCO	Choi Kang-hee (33), Lee Sang-chul (62, PK 75)	Kim Hong-woon (31, 47), Lee Kil-yong (68), Choi Sang-kook (73)	
19	20 September 1987		Hyundai	1–2	POSCO	Nam Ki-young (o.g. 58)	Lee Kee-keun (4), Choi Sang-kook (27)	
20	9 April 1988		POSCO	1–0	Hyundai	Kim Hong-woon (80)		
21	7 May 1988		Hyundai	0–1	POSCO		Hwang Young-woo (86)	
22	11 June 1988		Hyundai	3–1	POSCO	Yoon Deok-yeo (44), Baek Jong-chul (75), Kang Jae-soon (82)	Lee Kee-keun (15)	
23	23 July 1988		POSCO	0–2	Hyundai		Ham Hyun-gi (6, 89)	
24	4 September 1988		POSCO	2–2	Hyundai	Baek Chi-soo (37), Lee Kee-keun (56)	Kang Jae-soon (38), Choi Gun-taek (89)	
25	22 October 1988		Hyundai	0–1	POSCO		Choi Sang-kook (52)	
26	6 May 1989		Hyundai	0–0	POSCO			
27	9 May 1989		POSCO	0–1	Hyundai		Choi Gun-taek (68)	
28	28 May 1989		POSCO	0–2	Hyundai		Lee Hyo-yong (49), Lee Soo-chul (49)	
29	3 June 1989		Hyundai	0–0	POSCO			
30	13 September 1989		Hyundai	1–1	POSCO	Kim Jong-kun (65)	Lee Kee-keun (70)	
31	16 September 1989		POSCO	2–1	Hyundai	Cho Keung-yeon (6, 28)	Choi Gwang-ji (9)	
32	18 October 1989		POSCO	2–1	Hyundai	Baek Chi-soo (61), Choi Moon-sik (87)	Huh Ki-soo (42)	
33	21 October 1989		Hyundai	3–4	POSCO	Lee Jong-hwa (5), Kang Jae-soon (46), Lee Hak-jong (86)	Cho Keung-yeon (35, 50, 79), Kim Hong-woon (89)	
34	5 April 1990		POSCO	0–0	Hyundai			
35	21 April 1990		Hyundai	0–0	POSCO			
36	30 May 1990		POSCO	2–2	Hyundai	Choi Sang-kook (28), Lee Kye-won (48)	Lee Jong-hwa (76, 89)	
37	18 August 1990		Hyundai	1–1	POSCO	Shin Yon-ho (89)	Lee Kee-keun (76)	
38	9 October 1990		Hyundai	1–0	POSCO	Song Ju-seok (13)		
39	30 October 1990		POSCO	3–2	Hyundai	Lee Heung-sil (5), Lee Kye-won (53), Kim Sang-ho (78)	Choi Kang-hee (15), Ham Hyun-gi (81)	
40	31 March 1991		POSCO	0–0	Hyundai			
41	4 May 1991		Hyundai	1–0	POSCO	Kim Hyun-seok (25)		
42	29 June 1991		Hyundai	1–1	POSCO	Han Chang-woo (56)	Lee Won-chul (36)	
43	17 July 1991		Hyundai	1–1	POSCO	Kang Deuk-soo (33)	Lee Won-chul (52)	
44	10 August 1991		POSCO	0–2	Hyundai		Kim Hyun-seok (33), Song Ju-seok (47)	
45	7 September 1991		POSCO	1–0	Hyundai	Lee Kee-keun (81)		
46	14 September 1991		Hyundai	2–2	POSCO	Kwon Hyung-jung (o.g. 14), Choi Kang-hee (44)	Park Kyung-hoon (68), Lee Won-chul (74)	
47	3 November 1991		POSCO	0–1	Hyundai		Kim Hyun-seok (20)	
48	25 April 1992		Hyundai	1–0	POSCO	Shin Hong-gi (89)		
49	30 May 1992		POSCO	1–0	Hyundai	Park Tae-ha (41)		
50	4 July 1992		Hyundai	0–1	POSCO		Choi Moon-sik (33)	
51	10 October 1992		Hyundai	1–2	POSCO	Song Ju-seok (76)	Rade (13, 74)	
52	11 November 1992		POSCO	1–3	Hyundai	Park Chang-hyun (20)	Kang Jae-soon (26), Shin Hong-gi (37, 87)	
53	14 November 1992		POSCO	1–0	Hyundai	Hong Myung-bo (88)		
54	17 April 1993		POSCO	2–0	Hyundai	Park Chang-hyun (50), Lee Won-chul (85)		
55	22 May 1993		Hyundai	1–0	POSCO	Im Jae-sun (68)		
56	17 July 1993		POSCO	4–1	Hyundai	Yoo Dong-kwan (25), Lee Won-chul (30), Cha Sang-hae (35), Rade (68)	Im Jae-sun (18)	
57	11 September 1993		POSCO	2–0	Hyundai	Rade (49), Jang Young-hoon (64)		
58	15 September 1993		Hyundai	1–1 (PSO 4–3)	POSCO	Zoran (3)	Jang Young-hoon (PK 12)	
59	9 October 1993		Hyundai	0–0 (PSO 5–6)	POSCO			
60	9 April 1994		POSCO	0-1	Hyundai		Kim Jong-kun (68)	
61	30 April 1994		Hyundai	2-2	POSCO	Yoo Sang-chul (PK 28), Choi Dong-ho (86)	Park Chang-hyun (14), Kim Ki-nam (1971) (44)	
62	20 August 1994		POSCO	0–0	Hyundai			
63	14 September 1994		Hyundai	0–0	POSCO			
64	2 November 1994		POSCO	3–2	Hyundai	Hwang Sun-hong (14, 79), Rade (20)	Kim Jong-kun (25), Im Jae-sun (87)	
65	7 May 1995		Pohang	0–0	Hyundai			
66	29 July 1995		Hyundai	0-1	Pohang		Gu Sang-bum (25)	
67	19 August 1995		Hyundai	1-1	Pohang	Kim Hyun-seok (50)	Hwang Sun-hong (4)	
68	23 September 1995		Pohang	0–0	Hyundai			
69	15 May 1996		Pohang	0–0	Ulsan			
70	30 June 1996		Ulsan	2-3	Pohang	Shin Hong-gi (61, 86)	Rade (15), Lee Young-sang (PK 35), Park Tae-ha (53)	
71	29 August 1996		Pohang	3–2	Ulsan	Hwang Sun-hong (23, 82), Jeon Kyung-jun (54)	Jung Jeong-soo (48), Kim Hyun-seok (62)	
72	12 October 1996		Ulsan	0-2	Pohang		Jeon Kyung-jun (26), Park Tae-ha (69)	
73	4 May 1997		Ulsan	2-0	Pohang	Yoo Sang-chul (21), Kim Jong-kun (65)		
74	19 October 1997		Pohang	2-1	Ulsan	Tomou (44, 69)	Kim Sang-hoon (41)	
75	22 July 1998		Ulsan	4-4 (PSO 5-4)	Pohang	Kim Jong-kun (11, 62), Lee Moon-seok (17), Kim Ki-nam (1973) (40)	Lee Dong-gook (34, 58), Park Tae-ha (PK 48), Baek Seung-chul (72)	
76	10 October 1998		Pohang	1-2	Ulsan	Baek Seung-chul (40)	Jung Jeong-soo (12), Yoo Sang-chul (PK 35)	
77	21 October 1998	C	Pohang	3-2	Ulsan	Kim Myung-gon (57), Choi Moon-sik (89), Baek Seung-chul (90+6)	Jung Jeong-soo (16), Kim Jong-kun (90+3)	
78	24 October 1998	C	Ulsan	2-1	Pohang	Kim Hyun-seok (71), Kim Byung-ji (90)	Park Tae-ha (85)	
79	30 June 1999		Pohang	2-1	Ulsan	Lee Dong-gook (22, 33)	Kim Hyun-seok (25)	
80	18 August 1999		Ulsan	2-3	Pohang	Kim Sang-hoon (42), Victor (78)	Ko Jeong-woon (16, 52, 77)	
81	15 September 1999		Ulsan	3-4	Pohang	Kim Hyun-seok (22, 83), Kim Ki-nam (1973) (33)	Jung Dae-hoon (56, 64), Baek Seung-chul (67, 82)	
82	14 May 2000		Ulsan	1-1 (PSO 1-3)	Pohang	Jung Jeong-soo (87)	Kim Jong-chun (4)	
83	21 June 2000		Ulsan	1-0	Pohang	Ha Eun-cheul (90)		
84	6 September 2000		Pohang	2-3	Ulsan	Sasa (10, 69)	Lee Kil-yong (25), Ha Eun-cheul (41), Son Jeong-tak (82)	
85	11 July 2001		Ulsan	0-1	Pohang		Ha Seok-ju (50)	
86	25 August 2001		Pohang	3-2	Ulsan	Kim Sang-rok (53) Goran (63, 79)	Paulinho (73, 90+4)	
87	26 September 2001		Ulsan	2-1	Pohang	Lee Kil-yong (30), Savic (o.g. 52)	Ha Seok-ju (85)	
88	3 August 2002		Ulsan	3-0	Pohang	Alison (44), Lee Chun-soo (69), Kim Hyun-seok (75)		
89	18 September 2002		Ulsan	2-1	Pohang	Lee Kil-yong (61, 85)	Yoon Bo-young (42)	
90	25 September 2002		Pohang	1-0	Ulsan	Goran (10)		
91	26 March 2003		Pohang	2-1	Ulsan	Choi Yoon-yeol (8), Woo Sung-yong (61)	Lee Chun-soo (59)	
92	9 July 2003		Ulsan	0-0	Pohang			
93	31 August 2003		Pohang	2-3	Ulsan	Choi Chul-woo (8), Kim Gi-dong (17)	Dodô (26, PK 67), Balao (28)	
94	9 November 2003		Ulsan	1-2	Pohang	Balao (47)	Choi Yoon-yeol (15), Kim Sang-rok (31)	
95	23 May 2004		Ulsan	0-1	Pohang		Hwang Jin-sung (90)	
96	3 August 2004		Pohang	0-1	Ulsan		Zé Carlos (PK 32)	
97	5 December 2004	C	Pohang	1-0	Ulsan	Tavares (36)		
98	6 July 2005		Ulsan	1-3	Pohang	Yoo Sang-chul (44)	Lee Dong-gook (PK 17, 79), Itamar (87)	
99	29 October 2005		Pohang	2-1	Ulsan	Tavares (PK 77), Lee Jung-ho (88)	Machado (PK 55)	
100	10 May 2006		Pohang	0-0	Ulsan			
101	5 November 2006		Ulsan	0-1	Pohang		Lee Dong-gook (58)	
102	16 June 2007		Ulsan	0-0	Pohang			
103	10 October 2007		Pohang	1-0	Ulsan	Jonhes (21)		
104	28 October 2007	C	Ulsan	1-2	Pohang	Woo Sung-yong (70)	Hwang Jae-won (34), Lee Gwang-jae (76)	
105	15 March 2008		Ulsan	3-0	Pohang	Lee Jin-ho (12), Brasília (51), Woo Sung-yong (69)		
106	19 July 2008		Pohang	3-1	Ulsan	Denilson (14), Stevo (29), Jang Hyun-kyu (54)	Lee Jin-ho (19)	
107	22 November 2008	C	Ulsan	0-0 (PSO 4-2)	Pohang			
108	4 April 2009		Pohang	1-1	Ulsan	Kim Gi-dong (57)	Almir (74)	
109	1 August 2009		Ulsan	2-2	Pohang	Lee Jin-ho (50), Slavčo (90+1)	Kim Hyung-il (40), Yoo Chang-hyun (76)	
110	5 May 2010		Pohang	1-1	Ulsan	Lee Gi-dong (27)	Oh Beom-seok (73)	
111	29 August 2010		Ulsan	1-1	Pohang	Oh Beom-seok (88)	Kim Hyung-il (90+4)	
112	23 April 2011		Pohang	2-0	Ulsan	Cho Chan-ho (78), Chuva (84)		
113	16 October 2011		Ulsan	2-1	Pohang	Go Seul-ki (21), Ko Chang-hyun (90+2)	Asamoah (82)	
114	26 November 2011	C	Pohang	0-1	Ulsan		Seol Ki-hyeon (PK 72)	
115	3 March 2012		Pohang	0-1	Ulsan		Kim Shin-wook (44)	
116	27 June 2012		Ulsan	3-1	Pohang	Maranhão (27), Aki (47), Choi Jae-soo (66)	No Byung-jun (30)	
117	14 October 2012		Pohang	3-1	Ulsan	Kim Dae-ho (39), Derek Asamoah (67), Park Sung-ho (71)	Maranhão (56)	
118	3 November 2012		Ulsan	0-1	Pohang		No Byung-jun (68)	
119	18 May 2013		Pohang	1-2	Ulsan	Ko Moo-yeol (27)	Shin Kwang-hoon (OG, 24), Kim Yong-tae (82)	
120	28 August 2013		Ulsan	2-0	Pohang	Kim Young-sam (3), Han Sang-woon (68)		
121	22 September 2013		Pohang	1-1	Ulsan	Ko Moo-yeol (44)	Rafael (35)	
122	1 December 2013		Ulsan	0-1	Pohang		Kim Won-il (90+5)	
123	8 March 2014		Pohang	0-1	Ulsan		Kim Shin-wook (82)	
124	12 July 2014		Ulsan	0-2	Pohang		Kim Jae-sung (76), Kim Seung-dae (79)	
125	31 August 2014		Ulsan	1-2	Pohang	Kim Shin-wook (26)	Kang Soo-il (29), Kim Jae-sung (48)	
126	9 November 2014		Pohang	2-2	Ulsan	Kim Jae-sung (5), Kim Seung-dae (51)	Kim Chi-gon (34), Yang Dong-hyen (58)	
127	15 March 2015		Pohang	2-4	Ulsan	Son Jun-ho (47), Tiago (77)	Djeparov (45+1), Masuda (62), Yang Dong-hyen (66), Kim Shin-wook (78)	
128	25 May 2015		Ulsan	2-2	Pohang	Yang Dong-hyen (10, 32)	Tiago (14), Kim Seung-dae (52)	
129	19 August 2015		Ulsan	1-1	Pohang	Djeparov (66)	Ko Moo-yeol (17)	
130	14 May 2016		Ulsan	0-0	Pohang			
131	29 June 2016		Pohang	4-0	Ulsan	Yang Dong-hyen (9), Oh Chang-hyeon (13), Shim Dong-woon (62), Jo Soo-chul (80)		
132	18 September 2016		Ulsan	1-0	Pohang	Mendy (78)		
133	3 March 2017		Ulsan	2-1	Pohang	Jung Jae-yong (74, 86)	Yang Dong-hyen (82)	
134	17 June 2017		Pohang	1-2	Ulsan	Yang Dong-hyen (79)	Lee Jong-ho (50), Kim Seung-jun (90+1)	
135	13 August 2017		Ulsan	1-1	Pohang	Kim In-sung (18)	Yang Dong-hyen (2)	
136	31 March 2018		Pohang	2-1	Ulsan	Jung Won-jin (31), Kim Seung-dae (67)	Júnior Negrão (78)	
137	5 May 2018		Ulsan	2-1	Pohang	Kim In-sung (49), Toyoda (53)	Lee Keun-ho (1996) (18)	
138	15 September 2018		Ulsan	2-0	Pohang	Júnior Negrão (67), Lee Keun-ho (84)		
139	2 December 2018		Pohang	1-3	Ulsan	Lee Jin-hyun (39)	Lee Keun-ho (29), Lee Chang-yong (72), Júnior Negrão (76)	
140	4 May 2019		Pohang	2-1	Ulsan	Lee Jin-hyun (35), Kim Seung-dae (61)	Sin Jin-ho (31)	
141	15 June 2019		Ulsan	1-0	Pohang	Kang Min-soo (24)		
142	6 October 2019		Pohang	2-1	Ulsan	Paločević (PK 86), Lee Gwang-hyeok (90+2)	Kim Tae-hwan (50)	
143	1 December 2019		Ulsan	1-4	Pohang	Júnior Negrão (36)	Wanderson (26), Iljutcenko (55), Heo Yong-joon (87), Paločević (PK 90+7)	
144	6 June 2020		Pohang	0-4	Ulsan		Lee Chung-yong (25, 36), Kim In-sung (74), Júnior Negrão (84)	
145	15 August 2020		Ulsan	2-0	Pohang	Kim In-sung (53), Johnsen (55)		
146	18 October 2020		Pohang	4-0	Ulsan	Iljutcenko (2, 70), Paločević (78, 79)		
147	13 March 2021		Pohang	1-1	Ulsan	Song Min-kyu (72)	Kim Min-jun (22)	
148	22 May 2021		Ulsan	1-0	Pohang	Yoon Bit-garam (83)		
149	21 September 2021		Pohang	1-2	Ulsan	Grant (84)	Oh Se-hun (37), Vako (PK 50)	
150	27 March 2022		Ulsan	2-0	Pohang	Leonardo (70), Lim Jong-eun (87)		
151	2 July 2022		Pohang	2-0	Ulsan	Kim Seung-dae (15, 53)		
152	11 September 2022		Ulsan	1-2	Pohang	Ádám (PK 36)	Goh Young-joon (48), Roh Kyung-ho (90+3)	
153	11 October 2022		Pohang	1-1	Ulsan	Lee Ho-jae (79)	Vako (39)	
154	22 April 2023		Ulsan	2-2	Pohang	Joo Min-kyu (60), Vako (89)	Goh Young-joon (13, 54)	
155	8 July 2023		Pohang	0-1	Ulsan		Joo Min-kyu (23)	
156	30 September 2023		Pohang	0-0	Ulsan			
157	12 November 2023		Ulsan	3-2	Pohang	Seol Young-woo (46), Esaka (50), Joo Min-kyu (62)	Kang Hyun-je (31), Lee Ho-jae (PK 82)	
158	1 March 2024		Ulsan	1-0	Pohang	Esaka (51)		

=== League Cup matches ===
#	Date	Round	Home team	Score	Away team	Goals (Home)	Goals (Away)	Attendance
1	18 May 1986		POSCO	0–1	Hyundai		Ham Hyun-gi (72)	
2	8 June 1986		Hyundai	0–0; POSCO W/O	POSCO			
3	6 July 1986		POSCO	1–4	Hyundai	Kim Wan-soo (89)	Park Kyung-hoon (OG 41), Huh Jung-moo (54), Kim Jong-kun (84), Baek Jong-chul (89)	
4	7 September 1986		Hyundai	2–0	POSCO	Lee Jong-hwa (54), Kim Heung-kwon (74)		
5	1 July 1992		Hyundai	1–0	POSCO	Chung Jong-soo (60)		
6	30 September 1992		POSCO	2–1	Hyundai	Baek Ki-hong (24), Lee Jae-il (o.g. 35)	Kim Hyun-seok (44)	
7	3 November 1993		Hyundai	1–0	POSCO	Song Ju-seok (51)		
8	4 June 1994		Hyundai	0–0	POSCO			
9	25 March 1995		Hyundai	2–1	POSCO	Kim Hyun-seok (42), (75)	Rade Bogdanovic (13)	
10	10 April 1996		Ulsan	1–2	Pohang	Kim Jong-kun (14)	Park Tae-ha (32), Hwang Sun-hong (65)	
11	12 April 1997		Ulsan	1–1	Pohang	Shin Hong-gi (54)	Ahn Ik-soo (74)	
12	25 June 1997	Group Stage	Ulsan	0–1	Pohang		Hong Do-pyo (56)	
13	13 August 1997	Group Stage	Pohang	1–1	Ulsan	Konovalov (87)	Lee Hyun-seok (52)	
14	29 April 1998	Semi-finals	Ulsan	2–1	Pohang	Kim Hyun-seok (44), Park Jung-bae (90+1)	Savic (64)	
15	30 May 1998		Pohang	1–2	Ulsan	Park Tae-ha (36)	Kim Jong-kun (41, 85)	
16	6 August 1999		Pohang	1–1 (PSO 4–1)	Ulsan	Park Tae-ha (45)	Son Jeong-tak (65)	
17	18 July 2004		Pohang	3–1	Ulsan	Hwang Ji-soo (68), Hwang Jae-won (75), Carlos (90+1)	Kim Jin-yong (35)	
18	16 March 2005		Ulsan	1–1	Pohang	Zé Carlos (43)	Itamar (90+3)	
19	26 July 2006		Pohang	0–2	Ulsan		Kim Yoon-sik (o.g. 21), Choi Sung-kuk (74)	
20	14 March 2007	Group Stage	Ulsan	0–0	Pohang			
21	25 April 2007	Group Stage	Pohang	0–2	Ulsan		Yang Dong-hyen (58, 66)	

=== FA Cup matches ===
#	Date	Round	Home team	Score	Away team	Goals (Home)	Goals (Away)	Attendance
1	5 December 1996	Semi-finals	Pohang	1-0	Ulsan	Cho Jin-ho (80)		
2	23 November 1998	Semi-finals	Ulsan	2-1 (a.e.t.)	Pohang	Kim Jong-kun (82), Seo Dong-won (99)	Kim Myung-Gon (74)	
3	18 November 2001	Semi-finals	Pohang	2-1 (a.e.t.)	Ulsan	Lee Dong-gook (8), Yoon Bo-young (PK 99)	Lee Kil-yong (79)	
4	23 September 2020	Semi-finals	Ulsan	1-1 (PSO 4–3)	Pohang	Kim In-sung (52)	Kim Tae-hwan (o.g. 12)	

=== AFC Champions League matches ===
#	Date	Round	Home team	Score	Away team	Goals (Home)	Goals (Away)	Attendance
1	20 October 2021	Semi-finals	Ulsan	1-1 (PSO 4–5)	Pohang	Yun Il-lok (52)	Grant (89)	

=== Korean National Football Championship ===
#	Date	Round	Home team	Score	Away team	Goals (Home)	Goals (Away)	Attendance
1	22 November 1989	Quarter-final	Pohang	2-4	Ulsan	Lee Heung-sil (37), Choi Sang-kook (61)	Kim Heung-kwon (6), Ham Hyun-gi (31, 78), Choi Kang-hee (69)	

== Records and statistics ==
- As of 20 October 2021
- Penalty shoot-outs results are counted as a drawn match.

=== All-time results ===
Competition	Played	Pohang wins	Draws	Ulsan wins	Pohang goals	Ulsan goals
K League 1	149	57	45	47	188	179
League Cup	21	5	6	10	16	26
FA Cup	4	2	1	1	5	4
AFC Champions League	1	0	1	0	1	1
Korean National Football Championship	1	0	0	1	2	4
Total	176	64	53	59	212	214

== See also ==
- List of association football rivalries
- List of sports rivalries
- Nationalism and sport
