= 1998 K League Championship =

Tournament details
- Host country: South Korea
- Dates: 17–31 October 1998
- Teams: 4

Final positions
- Champions: Suwon Samsung Bluewings
- Runners-up: Ulsan Hyundai Horang-i

Tournament statistics
- Matches played: 5
- Goals scored: 9 (1.8 per match)
- Attendance: 131,871 (26,374 per match)
- Top scorer(s): 9 players (1 goal each)

The 1998 K League Championship was the fifth competition of the K League Championship, and was held to decide the 16th champions of the K League. It was contested between the top four clubs of the regular season. The first round was played as a single match between third place and fourth place of the regular season. The winners of the first round advanced to the semi-final, and played against runners-up of the regular season over two legs. The final progressed in the same way as the semi-final, and winners of the regular season qualified directly.

== Qualified teams ==
Pos	Team	Pld	W	OW	PW	L	GF	GA	GD	Pts	Qualification
1	Suwon Samsung Bluewings	18	9	1	2	6	33	22	+11	31	Qualification for the playoffs final
2	Ulsan Hyundai Horang-i	18	8	1	2	7	37	26	+11	28	Qualification for the playoffs semi-final
3	Pohang Steelers	18	8	2	0	8	34	23	+11	28	Qualification for the playoffs first round
4	Jeonnam Dragons	18	8	1	0	9	21	20	+1	26	Qualification for the playoffs first round

Source: RSSSF
Rules for classification: W) 3 points; WG) won with golden goal, 2 points; WP) won after penalty shoot-out, 1 point

== Bracket ==
First round
3	Pohang Steelers (p)	0 (5)
4	Jeonnam Dragons	0 (3)

Semi-final
2	Ulsan Hyundai Horang-i (p)	2	2	4 (4)
1R	Pohang Steelers	3	1	4 (1)

Final
SF	Ulsan Hyundai Horang-i	0	0	0
1	Suwon Samsung Bluewings	1	0	1

== First round ==
17 October 1998
15:30 KST

Pohang Steelers	0–0 (a.e.t.)	Jeonnam Dragons
	Report
Penalties
Ko Byung-woon (penalty scored); Baek Seung-chul (penalty scored); Kim Myung-gon (penalty scored); Oh Myung-kwan (penalty scored); Ahn Ik-soo (penalty scored)	5–3	Roh Sang-rae (penalty scored); Yoo Dong-woo (penalty missed); Kim Dong-woo (penalty scored); Oh Ju-po (penalty scored)

Pohang Steel Yard, Pohang
Attendance: 11,019

== Semi-final ==
=== First leg ===
21 October 1998
19:00 KST

Pohang Steelers	3–2	Ulsan Hyundai Horang-i
Kim Myung-gon 57'; Choi Moon-sik 89'; Baek Seung-chul 90+6'	Report	Jung Jeong-soo 16'; Kim Jong-kun 90+3'

Pohang Steel Yard, Pohang
Attendance: 17,216

=== Second leg ===
24 October 1998
15:00 KST

Ulsan Hyundai Horang-i	2–1 (a.e.t.)	Pohang Steelers
Kim Hyun-seok 71'; Kim Byung-ji 90'	Report	Park Tae-ha 85'
Penalties
	4–1

Ulsan Stadium, Ulsan
Attendance: 31,350

4–4 on aggregate. Ulsan Hyundai Horang-i won 4–1 on penalties.

== Final ==
=== First leg ===
28 October 1998
19:00 KST

Ulsan Hyundai Horang-i	0–1	Suwon Samsung Bluewings
	Report	Shin Hong-gi 61'

Ulsan Stadium, Ulsan
Attendance: 35,830

=== Second leg ===
31 October 1998
15:00 KST

Suwon Samsung Bluewings	0–0	Ulsan Hyundai Horang-i
	Report

Suwon Sports Complex, Suwon
Attendance: 36,456

Suwon Samsung Bluewings won 1–0 on aggregate.

== Final table ==
Pos	Team	Qualification
1	Suwon Samsung Bluewings (C)	Qualification for the Asian Club Championship
2	Ulsan Hyundai Horang-i	
3	Pohang Steelers	
4	Jeonnam Dragons	

Source: RSSSF
(C) Champions

== See also ==
- 1998 K League
