= Choi Moon-sik =

South Korean footballer

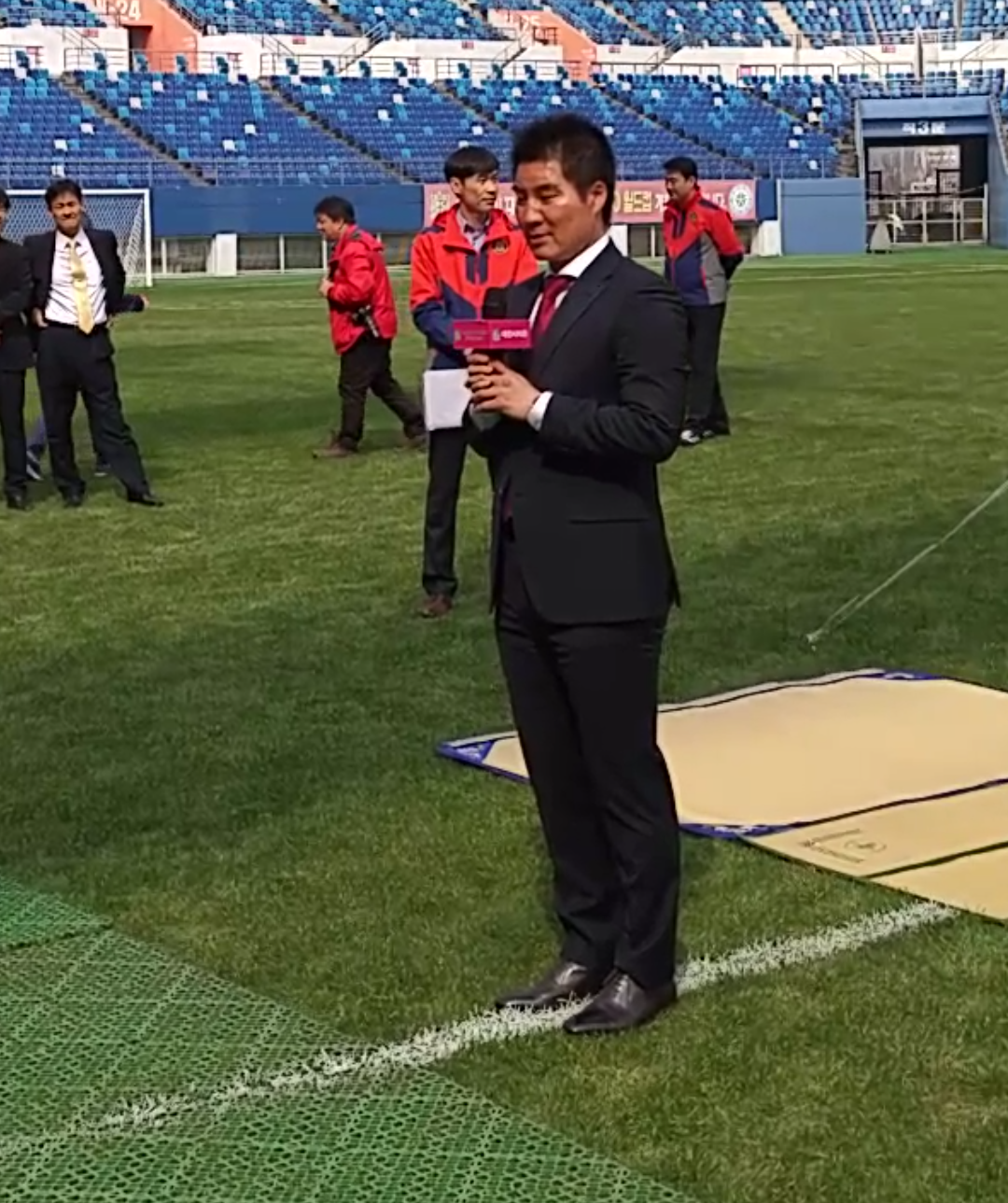
- Choi in 2016

Personal information
- Full name: Choi Moon-sik
- Date of birth: 6 January 1971 (age 55)
- Place of birth: Seoul, South Korea
- Height: 1.72 m (5 ft 8 in)
- Position: Attacking midfielder

Team information
- Current team: Ansan Greeners (manager)

Senior career*
Years	Team	Apps	(Gls)
1989–1998	Pohang Steelers	127	(26)
1996–1997	→ Sangmu FC (draft)		
1999–2000	Jeonnam Dragons	48	(8)
2001	Oita Trinita	9	(2)
2001	Suwon Samsung Bluewings	12	(0)
2002	Bucheon SK	20	(2)
Total		216	(38)

International career
1988	South Korea U20		
1991	South Korea U23	4	(3)
1993–1997	South Korea	38	(9)

Managerial career
- 2011: Jeonnam Dragons (assistant)
- 2012: South Korea U17
- 2012–2013: South Korea U20 (assistant)
- 2013–2015: South Korea U23 (assistant)
- 2015–2016: Daejeon Citizen
- 2017: Yanbian Funde (assistant)
- 2023: Kelantan
- 2025–: Ansan Greeners
- * Club domestic league appearances and goals

- Choi Moon-sik
- Hangul: 최문식
- Hanja: 崔文植
- RR: Choe Munsik
- MR: Ch'oe Munsik

Choi Moon-sik (born 6 January 1971) is a South Korean football manager and former player. Nicknamed the "Technician", he had a small physique, but was considered one of the most technically gifted footballers in South Korea. He was selected as a member of the South Korea national team for the 1994 FIFA World Cup. He is the current manager of K League 2 club Ansan Greeners.

== Career statistics ==
=== Club ===
Appearances and goals by club, season and competition
Club	Season	League			League cup		Total	
Club	Season	Division	Apps	Goals	Apps	Goals	Apps	Goals
Pohang Steelers	1989	K League	17	6	—		17	6
Pohang Steelers	1990	K League	20	2	—		20	2
Pohang Steelers	1991	K League	18	1	—		20	2
Pohang Steelers	1992	K League	24	5	7	1	31	6
Pohang Steelers	1993	K League	11	2	2	3	13	5
Pohang Steelers	1994	K League	19	6	0	0	19	6
Pohang Steelers	1995	K League	0	0	6	1	6	1
Pohang Steelers	1998	K League	18	4	18	2	36	6
Pohang Steelers	Total		127	26	33	7	160	33
Sangmu FC (draft)	1996	National Semipro League	?	?	? (Note: Appearance(s) in Korean National Semipro Championship)	?	?	?
Sangmu FC (draft)	1997	National Semipro League	?	?	?	?	?	?
Sangmu FC (draft)	Total		?	?	?	?	?	?
Jeonnam Dragons	1999	K League	26	5	7	2	33	7
Jeonnam Dragons	2000	K League	22	3	10	1	32	4
Jeonnam Dragons	Total		48	8	17	3	65	11
Oita Trinita	2001	J2 League	9	2	4	0	13	2
Suwon Samsung Bluewings	2001	K League	12	0	0	0	12	0
Bucheon SK	2002	K League	20	2	7	1	27	3
Career total			216	38	61	11	277	49

=== International ===
Appearances and goals by national team and year
National team	Year	Apps	Goals
South Korea	1993	17	4
South Korea	1994	3	0
South Korea	1996	4	1
South Korea	1997	14	4
Career total		38	9

Results list South Korea's goal tally first.

List of international goals scored by Choi Moon-sik
No.	Date	Venue	Opponent	Score	Result	Competition
1	13 May 1993	Beirut, Lebanon	India	2–0	3–0	1994 FIFA World Cup qualification
2	15 May 1993	Beirut, Lebanon	Hong Kong	3–0	3–0	1994 FIFA World Cup qualification
3	5 June 1993	Seoul, South Korea	Hong Kong	1–0	4–1	1994 FIFA World Cup qualification
4	27 September 1993	Seoul, South Korea	Australia	1–0	1–0	Friendly
5	5 August 1996	Ho Chi Minh City, Vietnam	Guam	9–0	9–0	1996 AFC Asian Cup qualification
6	22 February 1997	Hong Kong	Hong Kong	2–0	2–0	1998 FIFA World Cup qualification
7	2 March 1997	Bangkok, Thailand	Thailand	3–1	3–1	1998 FIFA World Cup qualification
8	12 June 1997	Seoul, South Korea	Egypt	3–1	3–1	1997 Korea Cup
9	14 June 1997	Suwon, South Korea	Ghana	3–0	3–0	1997 Korea Cup

== Managerial statistics ==
As of match played 1 April 2023

Managerial record by team and tenure
Team	From	To	Record					Ref.
Team	From	To	Pld	W	D	L	Win %	Ref.
Daejeon Citizen	27 May 2015	30 October 2016	70	20	15	35	28.57	
Kelantan	12 January 2023	4 April 2023	6	1	1	4	16.67	
Career total			76	21	16	39	27.63	

== Honours ==
Pohang Steelers

- K League 1: 1992
- Korean League Cup: 1993
- Asian Club Championship: 1997–98

Sangmu FC

- Korean National Semipro League (Autumn): 1996, 1997
- Korean National Championship: 1996

Jeonnam Dragons

- Korean League Cup runner-up: 2000+

Suwon Samsung Bluewings

- Korean League Cup: 2001
- Asian Club Championship: 2000–01
- Asian Super Cup: 2001

Individual

- Korean League Cup top goalscorer: 1993
- Korean President's Cup top goalscorer: 1996
- Korean National Championship Best Player: 1996
- K League All-Star: 2000
- K League '90s All-Star Team: 2003
