= An Ik-soo =

South Korean footballer and manager

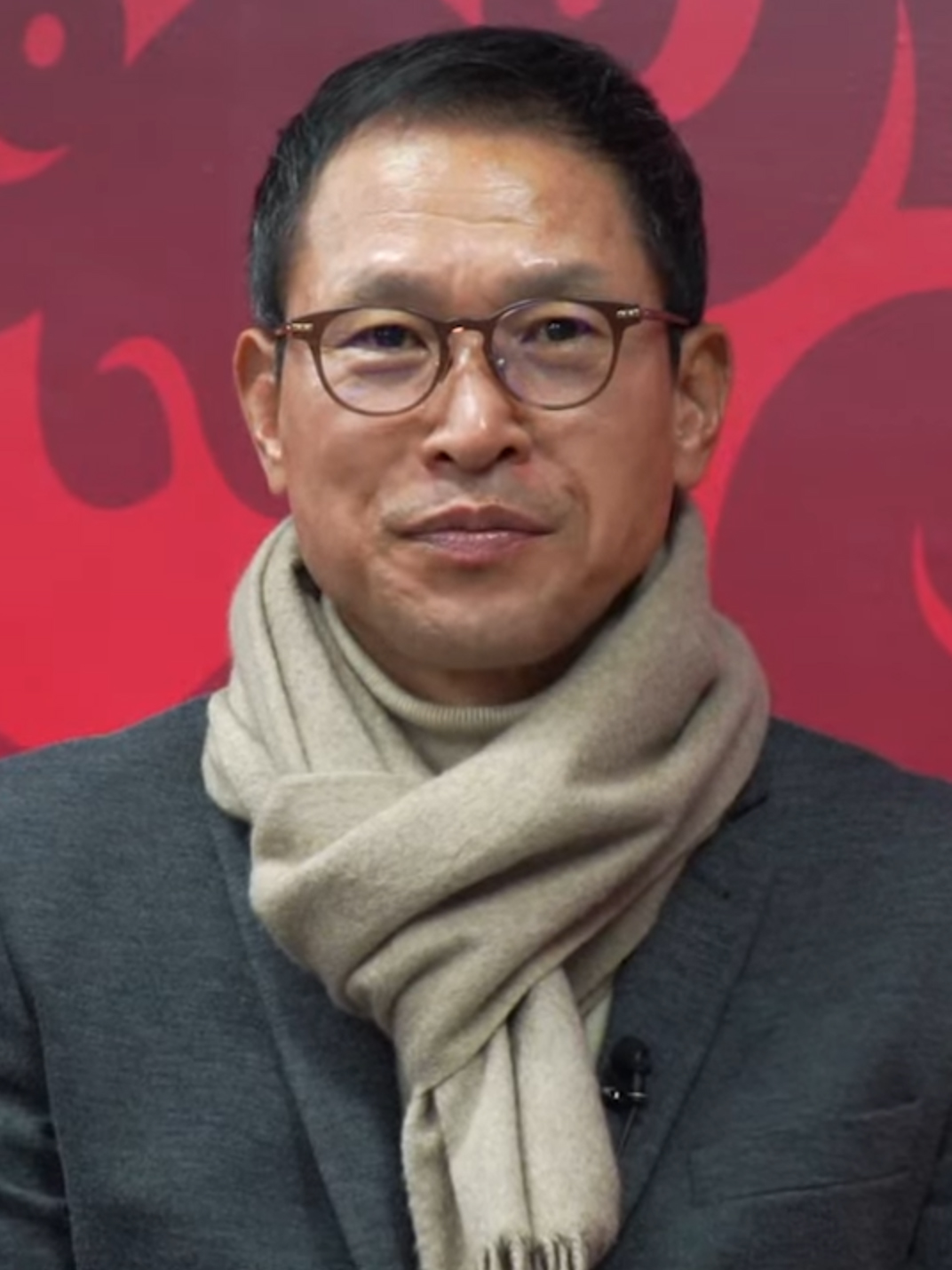
- An in December 2021

Personal information
- Full name: An Ik-soo
- Date of birth: 6 May 1965 (age 61)
- Place of birth: South Korea
- Height: 1.83 m (6 ft 0 in)
- Position: Centre-back

College career
Years	Team	Apps	(Gls)
1985	Incheon National University		

Senior career*
Years	Team	Apps	(Gls)
1986–1987	Sangmu FC (draft)		
1988	Kookmin Bank		
1989–1995	Ilhwa Chunma	142	(1)
1996–1998	Pohang Steelers	58	(0)
Total		200	(1)

International career
1994	South Korea	5	(0)

Managerial career
- 2007: Daekyo Kangaroos
- 2008–2009: South Korea (women)
- 2009: South Korea Universiade (women)
- 2010: FC Seoul (assistant)
- 2011–2012: Busan IPark
- 2013: Seongnam Ilhwa Chunma
- 2014–2016: South Korea U20
- 2018–2021: Sun Moon University
- 2021–2023: FC Seoul
Medal record
Women's football
Representing South Korea (as manager)
Summer Universiade
Gold medal – first place	2009 Belgrade	Team
- * Club domestic league appearances and goals

An Ik-soo (Korean: 안익수, Korean pronunciation: [a.nik̚.s͈u] or [an] [ik̚.s͈u]; born 6 May 1965) is a South Korean football manager and former player.

== Early life ==
An started to learn football professionally when he was 18 years old and a second-year student in high school. He was accepted to one of the prominent universities in South Korea Chung-Ang University through his academic performance, but he joined Incheon National University to continue his football career.

== Club career ==
An became a founding member of professional club Ilhwa Chunma in 1989 despite starting football very late. Furthermore, he became one of the best defenders in the K League, helping Ilhwa win three consecutive titles from 1993 to 1995. In 1994, he played five friendlies for the South Korea national football team prior to the 1994 FIFA World Cup due to his performances. He was also selected for the national team for the 1994 World Cup, but didn't appear in World Cup matches.

However, Ilhwa sold An to Pohang Steelers after the 1995 season because they thought he was old enough to deteriorate his ability, although he led them to Asian Club Championship title and K League title that year. An was named the MVP of the Asian Club Championship after defeating his former club Ilhwa in the final of the next tournament.

== International career ==
An was part of the South Korean national football team in 1994 FIFA World Cup.

== Career statistics ==
=== Club ===
Appearances and goals by club, season and competition
Club	Season	League			National cup		League cup		Continental		Total	
Club	Season	Division	Apps	Goals	Apps	Goals	Apps	Goals	Apps	Goals	Apps	Goals
Sangmu FC (draft)	1986	Semipro League	?	?	?	?	—		—		?	?
Sangmu FC (draft)	1987	Semipro League	?	?	?	?	—		—		?	?
Sangmu FC (draft)	Total		?	?	?	?	—		—		?	?
Kookmin Bank	1988	Semipro League	?	?	?	?	—		—		?	?
Ilhwa Chunma	1989	K League	22	0	?	?	—		—		22	0
Ilhwa Chunma	1990	K League	29	0	—		—		—		29	0
Ilhwa Chunma	1991	K League	12	0	—		—		—		12	0
Ilhwa Chunma	1992	K League	19	0	—		8	0	—		27	0
Ilhwa Chunma	1993	K League	23	0	—		3	0	—		26	0
Ilhwa Chunma	1994	K League	20	1	—		0	0	?	?	20	1
Ilhwa Chunma	1995	K League	17	0	—		0	0	?	?	17	0
Ilhwa Chunma	Total		142	1	?	?	11	0	?	?	153	1
Pohang Steelers	1996	K League	23	0	?	?	7	0	?	?	30	0
Pohang Steelers	1997	K League	15	0	?	?	19	1	?	?	34	1
Pohang Steelers	1998	K League	20	0	?	?	16	0	?	?	36	0
Pohang Steelers	Total		58	0	?	?	42	1	?	?	100	1
Career total			200	1	?	?	53	1	?	?	253	1

=== International ===
Appearances and goals by national team and year
National team	Year	Apps	Goals
South Korea	1994	5	0

== Honours ==
=== Player ===
Kookmin Bank

- Korean President's Cup runner-up: 1988

Ilhwa Chunma

- Asian Club Championship: 1995
- K League 1: 1993, 1994, 1995
- Korean League Cup: 1992

Pohang Steelers

- Asian Club Championship: 1996–97, 1997–98
- Korean FA Cup: 1996
- Korean League Cup runner-up: 1996, 1997+

Individual

- K League 1 Best XI: 1994, 1997, 1998
- Asian Club Championship Most Valuable Player: 1996–97
- Asian Club Championship Best Defender: 1996–97

=== Manager ===
Daekyo Kangaroos

- Korean Women's National Championship: 2007

South Korea Universiade (women)

- Summer Universiade: 2009

Busan IPark

- Korean League Cup runner-up: 2011

Individual

- K League Manager of the Month: November 2021
