= 1996–97 Asian Club Championship =

16th edition of premier club football tournament organized by the AFC

1996–1997 Asian Club Championship
Tournament details
- Dates: August 1996 – March 1997
- Teams: 26
- Venue: Shan Alam (final round)

Final positions
- Champions: (South Korea) Pohang Steelers (1st title)
- Runners-up: (South Korea) Cheonan Ilhwa Chunma
- Third place: (Iran) Persepolis
- Fourth place: (Iraq) Al-Zawraa

Tournament statistics
- Matches played: 51
- Goals scored: 155 (3.04 per match)
- Top scorer: Park Tae-Ha (3 goals)
- Best player: An Ik-Soo
- Fair play award: (Iraq) Al-Zawraa

The 1996–97 Asian Club Championship was the 16th edition of the annual international club football competition held in the AFC region (Asia). It determined that year's club champion of association football in Asia.

Pohang Steelers of South Korea won the final and became Asian champions for the first time after beating Cheonan Ilhwa Chunma in the first ever Asian top club tournament that ended in a one-country final.

== First round ==
=== West Asia ===
Team 1	Agg.	Team 2	1st leg	2nd leg
FK Neftchy Farg'ona (Uzbekistan)	8–2	(Tajikistan) Pamir Dushanbe	4–1	4–1
AiK Bishkek (Kyrgyzstan)	3–6	(Kazakhstan) Yelimay Semipalatinsk	2–4	1–2
Köpetdag Aşgabat (Turkmenistan)	0–1	(Iran) Persepolis	0–0	0–1
Kazma (Kuwait)	10–1	(Oman) Dhofar	9–0	1–1
West Riffa (Bahrain)	2–4	(Lebanon) Nejmeh	2–1	0–3
Al-Nassr (Saudi Arabia)	w/o^{1}	(United Arab Emirates) Al-Sharjah		
Al-Rayyan (Qatar)	bye			
Al-Zawraa (Iraq)	bye			

^{1} Al-Sharjah withdrew.

=== East Asia ===
Team 1	Agg.	Team 2	1st leg	2nd leg
Shanghai Shenhua (China)	9–2	(Hong Kong) Instant-Dict FC	7–1	2–1
Công an Thành phố Hồ Chí Minh (Vietnam)	1–2	(Malaysia) Johor F.C.	0–1	1–1(a.e.t.)
JCT FC (India)	2–2 (4–2p)	(Nepal) New Road Team	1–1	1–1
PSM Makassar (Indonesia)	1–4	(South Korea) Pohang Steelers	1–0	0–4
New Radiant (Maldives)	1–0	(Sri Lanka) Pettah United SC	1–0	n/p^{1}
Yokohama Marinos (Japan)	w/o^{2}	(Macau) GD Artilheiros		
Cheonan Ilhwa Chunma (South Korea)	bye			
Thai Farmers Bank FC (Thailand)	bye			

^{1} The 2nd leg was cancelled due to political violence in Sri Lanka.
^{2} GD Artilheiros withdrew.

== Second round ==
=== West Asia ===
Team 1	Agg.	Team 2	1st leg	2nd leg
Al-Zawraa (Iraq)	3–1	(Uzbekistan) FK Neftchy Farg'ona	1–0	2–1
Yelimay Semipalatinsk (Kazakhstan)	3–5	(Iran) Persepolis	3–0	0–5
Nejmeh (Lebanon)	1–4	(Saudi Arabia) Al-Nassr	1–0	0–4
Al-Kazma (Kuwait)	1–2	(Qatar) Al-Rayyan	0–1	1–1

=== East Asia ===
Team 1	Agg.	Team 2	1st leg	2nd leg
Cheonan Ilhwa Chunma (South Korea)	1–0	(China) Shanghai Shenhua	0–0	1–0
Yokohama Marinos (Japan)	3–1	(Malaysia) Johor F.C.	2–0	1–1
JCT FC (India)	1–2	(Maldives) New Radiant	1–0	0–2
Thai Farmers Bank FC (Thailand)	1–5	(South Korea) Pohang Steelers	1–3	0–2

== Quarterfinals ==
=== West Asia ===
Team	Pld	W	D	L	GF	GA	GD	Pts
(Iran) Persepolis	3	2	0	1	6	5	+1	6
(Iraq) Al-Zawraa	3	1	1	1	3	2	+1	4
(Saudi Arabia) Al-Nassr	3	1	1	1	4	4	0	4
(Qatar) Al-Rayyan	3	1	0	2	3	5	−2	3

8 November 1996

Al-Rayyan (Qatar)	2–1	(Saudi Arabia) Al-Nassr
Essa 55'; Al-Enazi 62'		Majed Abdullah 72'

Doha, Qatar

8 November 1996

Persepolis (Iran)	2–1	(Iraq) Al-Zawraa
Shahroudi 39'; Bezik 75'		Abbas 71'

Doha, Qatar

10 November 1996

Al-Nassr (Saudi Arabia)	3–2	(Iran) Persepolis
Kennedy 71', 88', 90'		Bezik 62'; Azizi 75'

Khalifa International Stadium, Doha, Qatar
Referee: Saad Kamil Al-Fadhli (Kuwait)

10 November 1996

Al-Zawraa (Iraq)	2–0	(Qatar) Al-Rayyan
Attiya 40'; Mahdi 55'

Doha, Qatar

12 November 1996

Al-Rayyan (Qatar)	1–2	(Iran) Persepolis
Mutlaq 65'		Azizi 44', 89'

Doha, Qatar

12 November 1996

Al-Nassr (Saudi Arabia)	0–0	(Iraq) Al-Zawraa

Khalifa International Stadium, Doha Qatar
Referee: Russamee Jindamai (Thailand)

=== East Asia ===
Team	Pld	W	D	L	GF	GA	GD	Pts
(South Korea) Cheonan Ilhwa Chunma	3	2	1	0	12	2	+10	7
(South Korea) Pohang Steelers	3	1	2	0	8	2	+6	5
(Japan) Yokohama Marinos	3	1	1	1	14	5	+9	4
(Maldives) New Radiant	3	0	0	3	0	25	−25	0

24 November 1996

Cheonan Ilhwa Chunma (South Korea)	9–0	(Maldives) New Radiant
Sang-Yoon 15'; Dong-Gun 37', 59'; Hwang Yeon-SeokYeon-Seok 44'; Ki-Beom 51'; Jung-Guk 68', 73'; Stepouchkine 69'; Agbo 89'

Daegu, South Korea

24 November 1996

Pohang Steelers (South Korea)	2–2	(Japan) Yokohama Marinos
Young-Sang 48'; Bogdanović 75'		Acosta 32'; Miura 39'

Daegu, South Korea

26 November 1996

New Radiant (Maldives)	0–6	(South Korea) Pohang Steelers
		Jin-Ho 32', 49' (pen.), 83', 89'; Konovalov 34', 61'

Daegu, South Korea

26 November 1996

Yokohama Marinos (Japan)	2–3	(South Korea) Cheonan Ilhwa Chunma
Acosta 34'; Noda 57'		Sang-Yoon 14', 51'; Yeon-Seok 60'

Daegu, South Korea

28 November 1996

Yokohama Marinos (Japan)	10–0	(Maldives) New Radiant
Suzuki 4'; Acosta 12', 28', 38', 57', 89'; Terakawa 13', 35'; Ueno 40'; Hirama 75'

Daegu, South Korea

28 November 1996

Pohang Steelers (South Korea)	0–0	(South Korea) Cheonan Ilhwa Chunma

Daegu, South Korea

== Knockout Stage ==
=== Bracket ===
Semi-finals
7 March – Shah Alam
(Iran) Persepolis	1
(South Korea) Pohang Steelers	3
7 March – Shah Alam
(South Korea) Cheonan Ilhwa Chunma	1
(Iraq) Al-Zawraa	0

Final
9 March – Shah Alam
(South Korea) Pohang Steelers (a.s.d.e.t.)	2
(South Korea) Cheonan Ilhwa Chunma	1
Third place play-off
9 March – Shah Alam
(Iran) Persepolis	4
(Iraq) Al-Zawraa	1

=== Semifinals ===
7 March 1997

Persepolis (Iran)	1–3	(South Korea) Pohang Steelers
Azizi 88'		Park Tae-Ha 9', 86'; Golmohammadi 55' (o.g.)

Shah Alam Stadium, Shah Alam, Malaysia

7 March 1997

Cheonan Ilhwa Chunma (South Korea)	1–0	(Iraq) Al-Zawraa
Chang-Won 42'

Shah Alam Stadium, Shah Alam, Malaysia

=== Third place match ===
9 March 1997

Persepolis (Iran)	4–1	(Iraq) Al-Zawraa
Bezik 20'; Mahdavikia 30'; Bagheri 65', 80'		Fawzi 8'

Shah Alam Stadium, Shah Alam, Malaysia

=== Final ===
9 March 1997

Pohang Steelers (South Korea)	2–1 (a.s.d.e.t.)	(South Korea) Cheonan Ilhwa Chunma
Park Tae-Ha 78'; Park Ji-Ho 117' (pen.)		Hong Jong-Kyoung 79'

Shah Alam Stadium, Shah Alam, Malaysia
Referee: Nik Ahmad (Malaysia)

== Awards ==
Award	Player	Team
Sanyo Most Valuable Player	(South Korea) An Ik-soo	(South Korea) Pohang Steelers
Coca-Cola Best Defender	(South Korea) An Ik-soo	(South Korea) Pohang Steelers
Diadora Top Goalscorer (Note: Goals since the semi-finals were counted.)	(South Korea) Park Tae-ha	(South Korea) Pohang Steelers
Snickers Fair Play Award	—	(Iraq) Al-Zawraa
