= 1997–98 Asian Club Championship =

17th edition of premier club football tournament organized by the AFC

1997–1998 Asian Club Championship
Tournament details
- Dates: ?? 1997 – April 1998
- Teams: 29
- Venue: Hong Kong (final round)

Final positions
- Champions: (South Korea) Pohang Steelers (2nd title)
- Runners-up: (China) Dalian Wanda
- Third place: (Saudi Arabia) Al-Hilal
- Fourth place: (Iran) Persepolis

Tournament statistics
- Matches played: 58
- Goals scored: 187 (3.22 per match)
- Best player: Ahmed Al-Dokhi

The 1997–98 Asian Club Championship was the 17th edition of the annual international club football competition held in the AFC region (Asia). It determined that year's club champion of association football in Asia.

Pohang Steelers of South Korea won their 2nd consecutive Asian Champions title, beating Dalian Wanda 6–5 on penalties.

== First round ==
=== West Asia ===
Team 1	Agg.	Team 2	1st leg	2nd leg
Al-Hilal (Saudi Arabia)	Bye	N/A	—	—
Navbahor Namangan (Uzbekistan)	Bye	N/A	—	—
Nisa Aşgabat (Turkmenistan)	Bye	N/A	—	—
Persepolis (Iran)	Bye	N/A	—	—
Taraz Zhambyl (Kazakhstan)	Bye	N/A	—	—
Sur (Oman)	0–9	(Iraq) Al-Zawraa	0–5	0–4
Al-Ansar (Lebanon)	3–1	(Kuwait) Al-Arabi	2–1	1–0
Al-Wahda (Yemen)	w/o^{1}	(United Arab Emirates) Al-Nasr		
Riffa (Bahrain)	w/o^{2}	(Qatar) Al-Rayyan		
Metallurg Kadamjay (Kyrgyzstan)	2–4	(Tajikistan) Dynamo Dushanbe	2–1^{3}	0–3

^{1} Al-Nasr withdrew.
^{2} Riffa withdrew.
^{3} First leg also reported 1–2.

=== East Asia ===
Team 1	Agg.	Team 2	1st leg	2nd leg
Pohang Steelers (South Korea)	13–0	(Bangladesh) Mohammedan SC	11–0	2–0
Victory SC (Maldives)	4–3	(Nepal) Mahendra Police	3–2	1–1
Finance and Revenue (Myanmar)	4–0	(Sri Lanka) Saunders SC	1–0	3–0
Churchill Brothers (India)	1–2	(Vietnam) Đồng Tháp F.C.	0–1	1–1
Persebaya Surabaya (Indonesia)	2–6	(South Korea) Ulsan Hyundai Horang-i	1–2	1–4
Kashima Antlers (Japan)	8–2	(Singapore) Geylang United	6–1	2–1
Selangor FA (Malaysia)	0–2	(Hong Kong) South China	0–0	0–2
Dalian Wanda (China)	4–2	(Thailand) Bangkok Bank	4–2	0–0

== Intermediate Round ==
=== Central Asia ===
Team 1	Agg.	Team 2	1st leg	2nd leg
Navbahor Namangan (Uzbekistan)	4–2	(Tajikistan) Dynamo Dushanbe	3–0	1–2
Taraz Zhambyl (Kazakhstan)	2–4	(Turkmenistan) Nisa Aşgabat	2–2	0–2

== Second round ==
=== West Asia ===
Team 1	Agg.	Team 2	1st leg	2nd leg
Al-Ansar (Lebanon)	4–0	(Yemen) Al-Wahda	2–0	2–0
Al-Zawraa (Iraq)	0–2	(Iran) Persepolis	0–0	0–2
Al-Hilal (Saudi Arabia)	3–2	(Qatar) Al-Rayyan	3–2	0–0
Navbahor Namangan (Uzbekistan)	8–3	(Turkmenistan) Nisa Aşgabat	6–1	2–2

=== East Asia ===
Team 1	Agg.	Team 2	1st leg	2nd leg
Pohang Steelers (South Korea)	15–0	(Maldives) Victory SC	3–0	12–0
Finance and Revenue (Myanmar)	4–4 (a)	(Vietnam) Đồng Tháp F.C.	0–1	4–3
Ulsan Hyundai Horang-i (South Korea)	2–6	(Japan) Kashima Antlers	1–5	1–1
South China (Hong Kong)	1–6	(China) Dalian Wanda	0–4	1–2

== Quarterfinals ==
=== West Asia ===
Pos	Team	Pld	W	D	L	GF	GA	GD	Pts	Qualification
1	(Iran) Persepolis	3	2	1	0	3	1	+2	7	Advance to Semi-finals
2	(Saudi Arabia) Al-Hilal	3	2	0	1	6	3	+3	6	Advance to Semi-finals
3	(Uzbekistan) Navbahor Namangan	3	0	2	1	2	4	−2	2	
4	(Lebanon) Al-Ansar (H)	3	0	1	2	1	4	−3	1	

(H) Hosts
22 February 1998

Al-Hilal (Saudi Arabia)	0–1	(Iran) Persepolis
		Mehdi Mahdavikia

Lebanon

22 February 1998

Al-Ansar (Lebanon)	0–0	(Uzbekistan) Navbahor Namangan

Lebanon

24 February 1998

Al-Hilal (Saudi Arabia)	3–1	(Uzbekistan) Navbahor Namangan

Lebanon

24 February 1998

Al-Ansar (Lebanon)	0–1	(Iran) Persepolis
		Mehdi Mahdavikia

Lebanon

26 February 1998

Persepolis (Iran)	1–1	(Uzbekistan) Navbahor Namangan
Alireza Emamifar

Lebanon

26 February 1998

Al-Ansar (Lebanon)	1–3	(Saudi Arabia) Al-Hilal
		Sami Al-Jaber 15'; Shreeda; Nawaf Al-Temyat

Lebanon
Referee: Russamee Jindamai (Thailand)

=== East Asia ===
Team	Pld	W	D	L	GF	GA	GD	Pts	Qualification
(South Korea) Pohang Steelers	3	2	0	1	8	4	+4	6	Advance to Semi-finals
(China) Dalian Wanda (H)	3	2	0	1	7	4	+3	6	Advance to Semi-finals
(Japan) Kashima Antlers	3	2	0	1	6	3	+3	6	
(Myanmar) Finance and Revenue	3	0	0	3	2	12	−10	0	

(H) Hosts
11 February 1998

Dalian Wanda (China)	4–1	(Myanmar) Finance and Revenue
Wang Tao 20'; Hao Haidong 26' 36'; Li Ming 46'		Win Aung 1'

Ningbo, Zhejiang, China PR
Attendance: 8,000

11 February 1998

Pohang Steelers (South Korea)	2–1	(Japan) Kashima Antlers
Park Tae-Ha 36'; Lee Dong-Gook 56'		Jorginho 58'

Ningbo, Zhejiang, China PR
Attendance: 7,000

13 February 1998

Kashima Antlers (Japan)	3–0	(Myanmar) Finance and Revenue
Toru Oniki 52'; Takayuki Suzuki 88' 89'

Ningbo, Zhejiang, China PR
Attendance: 7,000

13 February 1998

Pohang Steelers (South Korea)	1–2	(China) Dalian Wanda
Serhiy Konovalov 66'		Wu Chengying 74'; Wei Yimin 79'

Ningbo, Zhejiang, China PR
Attendance: 12,000

15 February 1998

Finance and Revenue (Myanmar)	1–5	(South Korea) Pohang Steelers
Aung Naining 55'		Baek Seung-Chul 15'; Lee Dong-Gook 56'; Serhiy Konovalov 60'; Park Tae-Ha 81' 88'

Ningbo, Zhejiang, China PR
Attendance: 22,000

15 February 1998

Dalian Wanda (China)	1–2	(Japan) Kashima Antlers
Li Ming 70'		Yasuo Manaka 47' 75'

Ningbo, Zhejiang, China PR
Attendance: 24,000

== Knockout Stage ==
=== Bracket ===
Semi-finals
3 April – Hong Kong
(Iran) Persepolis	0
(China) Dalian Wanda	2
3 April – Hong Kong
(South Korea) Pohang Steelers	1
(Saudi Arabia) Al-Hilal	0

Final
5 April – Hong Kong
(China) Dalian Wanda	0 (5)
(South Korea) Pohang Steelers (p)	0 (6)
Third place play-off
5 April – Hong Kong
(Iran) Persepolis	1
(Saudi Arabia) Al-Hilal	4

==== Semi-finals ====
3 April 1998

Persepolis (Iran)	0–2	(China) Dalian Wanda
		Wang Tao 32'; Hao Haidong 63'

Hong Kong Stadium, Hong Kong

3 April 1998

Pohang Steelers (South Korea)	1–0	(Saudi Arabia) Al-Hilal
Park Tae-ha 45'

Hong Kong Stadium, Hong Kong

==== Third place match ====
5 April 1998

Persepolis (Iran)	1–4	(Saudi Arabia) Al-Hilal

Hong Kong Stadium, Hong Kong

==== Final ====
5 April 1998

Dalian Wanda (China)	0–0 (a.e.t.)	(South Korea) Pohang Steelers
Penalties
	5–6

Hong Kong Stadium, Hong Kong
