= Yoo Sang-chul =

South Korean footballer (1971–2021)

- Yoo in July 2011

Personal information
- Date of birth: 18 October 1971
- Place of birth: Seoul, South Korea
- Date of death: 7 June 2021 (aged 49)
- Place of death: Seoul, South Korea
- Height: 1.84 m (6 ft 0 in)
- Position: Midfielder

College career
Years	Team	Apps	(Gls)
1990–1993	Konkuk University		

Senior career*
Years	Team	Apps	(Gls)
1994–1998	Ulsan Hyundai Horang-i	75	(21)
1999–2000	Yokohama F. Marinos	44	(24)
2001–2002	Kashiwa Reysol	33	(14)
2002–2003	Ulsan Hyundai Horang-i	18	(12)
2003–2004	Yokohama F. Marinos	36	(6)
2005–2006	Ulsan Hyundai Horang-i	13	(1)
Total		219	(78)

International career
1996–2004	South Korea U23	8 (Note: Appearances as an overage player (four appearances in Summer Olympics, four appearances in friendlies, including one appearance against non-national team))	(0)
1993	South Korea B		
1994–2005	South Korea	124	(18)

Managerial career
- 2011–2012: Daejeon Citizen
- 2014–2017: Ulsan University
- 2018: Jeonnam Dragons
- 2019: Incheon United
Medal record
Men's football
Representing South Korea
Summer Universiade
Silver medal – second place	1993 Buffalo	Team
AFC Asian Cup
Bronze medal – third place	2000 Lebanon	Team
EAFF Championship
Gold medal – first place	2003 Japan	Team
East Asian Games
Gold medal – first place	1993 Shanghai	Team
- * Club domestic league appearances and goals

- Yoo Sang-chul
- Hangul: 유상철
- Hanja: 柳想鐵
- RR: Yu Sangcheol
- MR: Yu Sangch'ŏl

Yoo Sang-chul (Korean: 유상철; 18 October 1971 – 7 June 2021) was a South Korean football player and manager. Yoo was regarded as one of the greatest South Korean midfielders of all time. He was selected as a midfielder of the 2002 FIFA World Cup All-Star Team and K League 30th Anniversary Best XI.

== Club career ==
In 1994, Yoo joined a K League club Ulsan Hyundai Horang-i, and was selected as a defender of the K League Best XI right after his first season. In 1996, he won the 1996 K League with Ulsan. In 1998, he won the K League scoring title, scoring 14 goals in 20 games, and was named as a midfielder in the K League Best XI.

Yoo was offered a trial from Barcelona after the 1998 FIFA World Cup. However, confusion regarding how agents work in European football caused him to miss out on the trial; furthermore, his club Ulsan had already agreed to a contract-binding deal to sell him to Yokohama F. Marinos.

Yoo briefly joined Kashiwa Reysol in 2001, where he played 33 games and scored 14 goals. Following his success at the 2002 FIFA World Cup, there was interest from many major European football clubs, and he nearly signed a deal with Tottenham Hotspur, to the point that he had already said farewell to Kashiwa; but the negotiation broke down. Without a club, he returned to Ulsan after the registration deadline and was granted a special exemption to play with the team. With only eight matches left in the 2002 season, he scored nine goals, helping Ulsan move from a mid-table position to a title challenge, finishing in second place. That season, he picked up another Best XI award as a forward, after finishing with the third-most goals in the league. He was one of only two players in K League history to have been included in all three outfield positions of the Best XI.

Back at Yokohama, Yoo won the J.League in 2003 and 2004, before returning to Ulsan and winning one more title in 2005. Following that title, a chronic left knee injury forced him to retire from football.

== International career ==
Yoo scored two goals for South Korea in FIFA World Cup, one in 1998 against Belgium, and another in 2002 against Poland. He played a key part of the South Korea national team when they reached the semi-finals in the 2002 FIFA World Cup, and was named to the World Cup all-star team. He was also part of the South Korea under-23 team for the 2004 Summer Olympics, who finished second in Group A, making it through to the next round, before being defeated by Paraguay, the eventual silver medalists.

== Style of play ==
Yoo was one of South Korea's most versatile players in the 1990s and 2000s. He was originally a defensive player, who could perform roles of stopper and right back with excellent physical strength, but he had the ability to spark attacks with his incisive distribution after getting great positioning and wide vision in his experiences. He could even be deployed as a forward, and he became the top goal-scorer of the league. His versatility allowed him to shine in almost any area of the field from defence to attack, and his presence allowed coach Guus Hiddink to alter tactics easily during World Cup matches. After his retirement, he shocked Koreans by revealing that he was blind in the left eye during his career.

== Managerial career ==
Yoo Sang-chul began managing in 2009 as a high school football manager, at Chuncheon Machinery Technical High School.

On 17 July 2011, he was appointed manager of Daejeon Citizen. This was a tough appointment, because a match-fixing scandal caused Daejeon to lose nearly half of their players just before his appointment. Then, in 2012, a relegation system was introduced, threatening the Citizens with relegation. In the 2012 season, while it was close, the Daejeon Citizens managed to avoid relegation. Following the expiration of his contract at the end of the 2012 season, negotiations to extend his contract failed, and the Daejeon Citizens appointed a different manager, a move which many fans found controversial.

In January 2014, Yoo became the manager of the Ulsan University football team, the affiliate university team of the Ulsan Hyundai football club where he had spent his entire K-League career. He remained with Ulsan University until December 2017, when he was appointed manager of the Jeonnam Dragons.

Under Yoo, the Jeonnam Dragons attempted to reorganize the team around a youth movement. However, the team struggled to score goals, and despite Yoo's request, they were unable to land a better forward. His tenure at Jeonnam Dragons ended on 16 August 2018, when he resigned after only three victories, with the team doing poorly in the 2018 K League 1 standings. Jeonnam Dragons would eventually be relegated at the end of the season.

On 14 May 2019, Yoo was appointed manager of Incheon United. At the time of his appointment, Incheon United was at the bottom of the 2019 K League 1, with only 6 points in 11 games. While managing Incheon United in October 2019, Yoo was diagnosed with stage 4 pancreatic cancer. Despite the diagnosis, he continued to manage Incheon United and helped the club avoid relegation, before resigning in January 2020. After resigning, he was named the honorary head coach. In June 2020, when Incheon United had another managerial vacancy, Yoo approached the team and asked to be appointed the manager again, but he was turned down on account of his poor health.

== Death ==
On 21 November 2019, Yoo announced that he had been diagnosed with stage 4 pancreatic cancer, which caused him to be hospitalised. He died on 7 June 2021 in Seoul at the age of 49.

== Career statistics ==
=== Club ===
Appearances and goals by club, season and competition
Club	Season	League			National cup		League cup		Continental		Total	
Club	Season	Division	Apps	Goals	Apps	Goals	Apps	Goals	Apps	Goals	Apps	Goals
Ulsan Hyundai Horang-i	1994	K League	20	5	—		6	0	—		26	5
Ulsan Hyundai Horang-i	1995	K League	26	1	—		7	1	—		33	2
Ulsan Hyundai Horang-i	1996	K League	2	0	? (Note: Appearance(s) in Korean FA Cup)	?	4	1	? (Note: Appearance(s) in Asian Club Championship)	?	6	1
Ulsan Hyundai Horang-i	1997	K League	7	1	?	?	10	0	?	?	17	1
Ulsan Hyundai Horang-i	1998	K League	20	14	?	?	3	1	?	?	23	15
Ulsan Hyundai Horang-i	Total		75	21	?	?	30	3	?	?	105	24
Yokohama F. Marinos	1999	J1 League	22	7	3	1	3	0	—		28	8
Yokohama F. Marinos	2000	J1 League	22	17	3	0	6	4	—		31	21
Yokohama F. Marinos	Total		44	24	6	1	9	4	—		59	29
Kashiwa Reysol	2001	J1 League	24	9	1	0	0	0	—		25	9
Kashiwa Reysol	2002	J1 League	9	5	0	0	0	0	—		9	5
Kashiwa Reysol	Total		33	14	1	0	0	0	—		34	14
Ulsan Hyundai Horang-i	2002	K League	8	9	?	?	0	0	—		8	9
Ulsan Hyundai Horang-i	2003	K League	10	3	?	?	—		—		10	3
Ulsan Hyundai Horang-i	Total		18	12	?	?	0	0	—		18	12
Yokohama F. Marinos	2003	J1 League	17	6	2	0	3	0	—		22	6
Yokohama F. Marinos	2004	J1 League	19	0	1	0	2	0	4	1	26	1
Yokohama F. Marinos	Total		36	6	3	0	5	0	4	1	48	7
Ulsan Hyundai Horang-i	2005	K League	12	1	?	?	6	0	—		18	1
Ulsan Hyundai Horang-i	2006	K League	1	0	?	?	0	0	? (Note: Appearance(s) in AFC Champions League)	?	1	0
Ulsan Hyundai Horang-i	Total		13	1	?	?	6	0	?	?	19	1
Career total			219	78	10	1	50	7	4	1	283	87

=== International ===
Appearances and goals by national team and year
National team	Year	Apps	Goals
South Korea	1994	10	1
South Korea	1995	8	0
South Korea	1996	5	1
South Korea	1997	21	7
South Korea	1998	24	3
South Korea	1999	2	0
South Korea	2000	11	0
South Korea	2001	8	3
South Korea	2002	16	1
South Korea	2003	9	1
South Korea	2004	5	1
South Korea	2005	5	0
Career total		124	18

Scores and results list Korea Republic's goal tally first, score column indicates score after each Yoo goal.

List of international goals scored by Yoo Sang-chul
No.	Date	Venue	Cap	Opponent	Score	Result	Competition
1	11 October 1994	Hiroshima, Japan	8	Japan	1–1	3–2	1994 Asian Games
2	30 April 1996	Tel Aviv, Israel	19	Israel	2–0	5–4	Friendly
3	25 January 1997	Sydney, Australia	26	New Zealand	3–1	3–1	1997 Opus Tournament
4	21 May 1997	Tokyo, Japan	30	Japan	1–0	1–1	Friendly
5	28 May 1997	Daejeon, South Korea	31	Hong Kong	1–0	4–0	1998 FIFA World Cup qualification
6	12 June 1997	Seoul, South Korea	33	Egypt	2–1	3–1	1997 Korea Cup
7	24 August 1997	Daegu, South Korea	37	Tajikistan	4–1	4–1	Friendly
8	4 October 1997	Seoul, South Korea	40	United Arab Emirates	2–0	3–0	1998 FIFA World Cup qualification
9	18 October 1997	Tashkent, Uzbekistan	42	Uzbekistan	2–0	5–1	1998 FIFA World Cup qualification
10	25 June 1998	Paris, France	62	Belgium	1–1	1–1	1998 FIFA World Cup
11	9 December 1998	Bangkok, Thailand	66	United Arab Emirates	2–0	2–1	1998 Asian Games
12	14 December 1998	Bangkok, Thailand	68	Thailand	1–1	1–2	1998 Asian Games
13	11 February 2001	Dubai, United Arab Emirates	84	United Arab Emirates	2–1	4–1	2001 Dubai Tournament
14	1 June 2001	Ulsan, South Korea	87	Mexico	2–1	2–1	2001 FIFA Confederations Cup
15	9 December 2001	Seogwipo, South Korea	89	United States	1–0	1–0	Friendly
16	4 June 2002	Busan, South Korea	98	Poland	2–0	2–0	2002 FIFA World Cup
17	8 December 2003	Saitama, Japan	113	China	1–0	1–0	2003 EAFF Championship
18	5 June 2004	Daegu, South Korea	116	Turkey	1–1	2–1	Friendly

== Honours ==
Ulsan Hyundai Horang-i

- K League 1: 1996, 2005
- Korean League Cup: 1995, 1998
- Korean Super Cup: 2006
- A3 Champions Cup: 2006

Yokohama F. Marinos

- J1 League: 2003, 2004

South Korea B

- Summer Universiade silver medal: 1993
- East Asian Games: 1993

South Korea

- AFC Asian Cup third place: 2000
- EAFF Championship: 2003

Individual

- K League 1 Best XI: 1994, 1998, 2002
- K League All-Star: 1995, 1997, 1998, 2005
- K League 1 top goalscorer: 1998
- AFC Asian All-Star: 1998
- FIFA World XI: 2000
- FIFA World Cup All-Star Team: 2002
- FIFA World Cup Fans' All-Star Team: 2002
- EAFF Championship Most Valuable Player: 2003
- K League 30th Anniversary Best XI: 2013
- K League Hall of Fame: 2025

== See also ==
- List of men's footballers with 100 or more international caps
