= Oh Chang-hyeon =

South Korean footballer (born 1993)

Personal information
- Date of birth: 2 March 1993 (age 33)
- Place of birth: South Korea
- Height: 1.78 m (5 ft 10 in)
- Position: Midfielder

Team information
- Current team: Seongnam FC
- Number: 17

Youth career
- 2009–2011: Bukyeong High School
- 2012–2014: Dankook University

Senior career*
Years	Team	Apps	(Gls)
2015–	Pohang Steelers	20	(2)
2018–	→ Seongnam FC (loan)	0	(0)

International career^{‡}
2014–	South Korea U-20	3	(0)
- * Club domestic league appearances and goals as of 26 November 2018 ‡ National team caps and goals as of 13 September 2016

- Oh Chang-hyeon
- Hangul: 오창현
- Hanja: 吳昌炫
- RR: O Changhyeon
- MR: O Ch'anghyŏn

Oh Chang-hyeon (Korean: 오창현; Hanja: 吳昌炫; born 2 March 1993) is a South Korean football midfielder who plays for Seongnam FC in K League Challenge.

== Club career ==
=== Pohang Steelers ===
Oh joined Pohang Steelers in 2016. In 2015 season he didn't play any game because of his frequent injuries. On 12 June 2016, Oh finally made his league debut against Jeonnam Dragons at Gwangyang Football Stadium. In this match, Oh played 33 minutes after he was substituted for Hwang Ji-soo. On 29 June 2016, Oh scored his first professional goal in the Donghaean derby with Ulsan Hyundai. In the match, Pohang won by 4–0.

== International career ==
He has been a member of the South Korea national U-20 team since 2014. In 2014, he played in 2014 Toulon Tournament.

== Club career statistics ==
Club performance			League		Cup		continental		Total	
Season	Club	League	Apps	Goals	Apps	Goals	Apps	Goals	Apps	Goals
South Korea			League		KFA Cup		Asia		Total	
2016	Pohang Steelers	KL Classic	13	1	0	0	0	0	13	1
Total	South Korea		13	1	0	0	0	0	13	1
Career total			13	1	0	0	0	0	13	1
