= 1993 Korean League Cup =

1993 Adidas Cup
Tournament details
- Country: South Korea
- Dates: 23 October – 6 November 1993
- Teams: 6

Final positions
- Champions: POSCO Atoms (1st title)
- Runners-up: Hyundai Horang-i

Tournament statistics
- Matches played: 15
- Goals scored: 33 (2.2 per match)
- Top goal scorer(s): Choi Moon-sik; Kang Jae-soon; Lim Keun-jae (3 goals each)

The 1993 Korean League Cup, also known as the Adidas Cup 1993, was the third competition of the Korean League Cup.

== Table ==
Pos	Team	Pld	W	OW	PW	L	GF	GA	GD	Pts
1	POSCO Atoms (C)	5	4	0	0	1	9	4	+5	8
2	Hyundai Horang-i	5	1	3	0	1	0	5	−5	8
3	Daewoo Royals	5	3	0	0	2	6	3	+3	6
4	LG Cheetahs	5	1	0	1	3	5	6	−1	4
5	Ilhwa Chunma	5	1	0	1	3	4	10	−6	4
6	Yukong Elephants	5	0	0	0	5	1	5	−4	0

Source: RSSSF
Rules for classification: All wins (including overtime win and penalty shoot-out win) get 2 points.
(C) Champion

== Matches ==
October 23
14:00 UTC+9

Hyundai Horang-i	2–1 (a.e.t.)	Yukong Elephants
Kim Seong-gu 78'; Song Ju-seok 116'		Jo Jeong-hyeon 37'

Ulsan Sports Complex
Attendance: 1,500

October 23
15:30 UTC+9

POSCO Atoms	1–0	LG Cheetahs
Bogdanović 38'

Steelyard Stadium
Attendance: 25,000

October 23
15:00 UTC+9

Ilhwa Chunma	0–2	Daewoo Royals
		Hwang Gyu-ryong 28'; Jo Chang-geun 82'

Dongdaemun Stadium
Attendance: 1,200

October 27
19:00 UTC+9

Daewoo Royals	0–1	POSCO Atoms
		Jang Yeong-hun 75'

Busan Gudeok stadium
Attendance: 300

October 27
17:00 UTC+9

Yukong Elephants	0–0	Ilhwa Chunma
Penalties
	7–6

Dongdaemun Stadium
Attendance: 850

October 27
15:00 UTC+9

LG Cheetahs	2–3 (a.e.t.)	Hyundai Horang-i
Lim Keun-jae 31'; Choi Dae-shik 49'		Baek Seung-dae 33'; Kang Jae-soon 79' 114'

Dongdaemun Stadium
Attendance: 250

October 30
15:00 UTC+9

POSCO Atoms	2–0	Yukong Elephants
Park Chang-hyeon 35'; Lee Gye-won 41'

Gwang-Yang Stadium
Attendance: 7,000

October 30
15:00 UTC+9

Daewoo Royals	2–0	LG Cheetahs
Kim Gwi-hwa 43'; Bernuncio 46'

Busan Gudeok stadium
Attendance: 450

October 30
15:00 UTC+9

Ilhwa Chunma	1–0	Hyundai Horang-i
Shin Tae-yong 48'

Dongdaemun Stadium
Attendance: 340

November 3
14:00 UTC+9

Hyundai Horang-i	1–0 (a.e.t.)	POSCO Atoms
Song Ju-seok 96'

Ulsan Sports Complex
Attendance: 400

November 3
15:00 UTC+9

Yukong Elephants	0–1	Daewoo Royals
		Ryu Woong-ryeol 67'

Dongdaemun Stadium
Attendance: 1,000

November 3
17:00 UTC+9

LG Cheetahs	3–0	Ilhwa Chunma
Lim Keun-jae 38', 54'; Lee In-jae 90'

Dongdaemun Stadium
Attendance: 2,500

November 6
15:00 UTC+9

LG Cheetahs	0–0	Yukong Elephants
Penalties
	3–2

Dongdaemun Stadium
Attendance: 400

November 6
15:00 UTC+9

Daewoo Royals	1–2	Hyundai Horang-i
Park Hyeon-yong 88'		Kang Jae-soon 5'; Shin Hong-gi 83'

Busan Gudeok stadium
Attendance: 500

November 6
15:00 UTC+9

Ilhwa Chunma	3–5	POSCO Atoms
Lee Tae-hong 69', 71'; Park Nam-yeol 85'		Yoon Sung-hyo 59', 87'; Choi Moon-sik 63', 74', 80'

Mokdong Stadium
Attendance: 500

== Awards ==
Award	Player	Team	Points
Top goalscorer	(South Korea) Choi Moon-sik	POSCO Atoms	3 goals
Top assist provider	(Argentina) Rubén Bernuncio	Daewoo Royals	2 assists

== See also ==
- 1993 K League
