= Lee Heung-sil =

South Korean footballer (born 1961)

Personal information
- Full name: Lee Heung-sil
- Date of birth: 10 July 1961 (age 65)
- Place of birth: Jinhae, Gyeongnam, South Korea
- Height: 1.68 m (5 ft 6 in)
- Position: Attacking midfielder

College career
Years	Team	Apps	(Gls)
1981–1984	Hanyang University		

Senior career*
Years	Team	Apps	(Gls)
1985–1992	POSCO Atoms	169	(47)
1993	Wansan Puma	0	(0)

International career
1982–1989	South Korea B		
1982–1990	South Korea	9	(0)

Managerial career
- 2012: Jeonbuk Hyundai Motors (caretaker)
- 2015–2016: Ansan Mugunghwa
- 2017–2018: Ansan Greeners
- 2019: Viettel
- 2019: Daejeon Citizen
- * Club domestic league appearances and goals

Lee Heung-sil (Korean: 이흥실; born 10 July 1961) is a South Korean football manager and former footballer. He was a participant in the 1990 FIFA World Cup.

== Club career ==
Lee was one of the greatest K League midfielders early in the history of K League. He received various seasonal awards by being named the Most Valuable Player, Rookie of the Year, top assist provider, and five-time Best XI winner, while spending his entire professional career at POSCO Atoms. He is also the first-ever player in the K League to score 30 goals and provide 30 assists. He helped POSCO Atoms win three K League titles.

== Style of play ==
Nicknamed the "Little Tank" in South Korea, Lee was noted for his powerful dribbles and creative passes, although he had some weaknesses such as lack of defensive ability and height.

== Career statistics ==
=== Club ===
Appearances and goals by club, season and competition
Club	Season	League			National cup		League cup		Total	
Club	Season	Division	Apps	Goals	Apps	Goals	Apps	Goals	Apps	Goals
POSCO Atoms	1985	K League	21	10	—		—		21	10
POSCO Atoms	1986	K League	17	5	—		11	1	28	6
POSCO Atoms	1987	K League	29	12	—		—		29	12
POSCO Atoms	1988	K League	16	1	? (Note: Appearance(s) in Korean National Championship)	?	—		16	1
POSCO Atoms	1989	K League	39	4	2	2	—		39	4
POSCO Atoms	1990	K League	19	7	—		—		19	7
POSCO Atoms	1991	K League	15	4	—		—		15	4
POSCO Atoms	1992	K League	13	4	—		2	0	15	4
Career total			169	47	2	2	13	1	184	50

== Honours ==
=== Player ===
Hanyang University

- Korean National Championship: 1983

POSCO Atoms

- K League 1: 1986, 1988, 1992

Individual

- K League Rookie of the Year: 1985
- K League 1 Best XI: 1985, 1986, 1987, 1989, 1990
- K League 1 Most Valuable Player: 1986
- Korean FA Best XI: 1986
- K League top assist provider: 1989
- K League '80s All-Star Team: 2003

=== Manager ===
Ansan Mugunghwa

- K League 2: 2016

Individual

- K League Manager of the Month: June 2016
