= Park Tae-ha =

South Korean footballer

Personal information
- Full name: Park Tae-ha
- Date of birth: 29 May 1968 (age 58)
- Place of birth: Yeongdeok, South Korea
- Height: 1.77 m (5 ft 9 1/2 in)
- Position: Winger

College career
Years	Team	Apps	(Gls)
- Daegu University

Senior career*
Years	Team	Apps	(Gls)
1991–2001	Pohang Steelers	189	(31)
1993–1995	→ Sangmu FC (draft)		

International career
1994–2000	South Korea	11	(7)

Managerial career
- 2007–2011: South Korea (assistant)
- 2012: FC Seoul (assistant)
- 2014–2018: Yanbian Funde
- 2018–2019: China U20 (women)
- 2023–2026: Pohang Steelers
- * Club domestic league appearances and goals

Park Tae-ha (born 29 May 1968) is a South Korean football manager and former player.

A one-club man of Pohang Steelers, Park played as a winger, while winning two Asian Club Championship titles and one K League title. During the knockout stage of the 1996–97 Asian Club Championship, he scored twice in the semi-finals, and once in the final, becoming the top goalscorer of the tournament with three goals.

After retiring as a player, Park managed Yanbian Funde from 2015 to 2018, and the China women's under-20 team from 2018 to 2019. He has been managing Pohang Steelers since 2023. He won the 2015 China League One and the 2024 Korea Cup as a manager.

== Career statistics ==
=== International ===
List of international goals scored by Park Tae-ha
No.	Date	Venue	Opponent	Score	Result	Competition
1	5 August 1996	Thong Nhat Stadium, Ho Chi Minh City, Vietnam	Guam	1–0	9–0	1996 AFC Asian Cup qualification
2	5 August 1996	Thong Nhat Stadium, Ho Chi Minh City, Vietnam	Guam	2–0	9–0	1996 AFC Asian Cup qualification
3	5 August 1996	Thong Nhat Stadium, Ho Chi Minh City, Vietnam	Guam	6–0	9–0	1996 AFC Asian Cup qualification
4	8 August 1996	Thong Nhat Stadium, Ho Chi Minh City, Vietnam	Chinese Taipei	3–0	4–0	1996 AFC Asian Cup qualification
5	8 August 1996	Thong Nhat Stadium, Ho Chi Minh City, Vietnam	Chinese Taipei	4–0	4–0	1996 AFC Asian Cup qualification
6	11 August 1996	Thong Nhat Stadium, Ho Chi Minh City, Vietnam	Vietnam	3–0	4–0	1996 AFC Asian Cup qualification
7	23 November 1996	Suwon Sports Complex, Suwon, South Korea	Colombia	4–1	4–1	Friendly

== Honours ==
=== Player ===
Pohang Steelers

- K League 1: 1992
- Korean FA Cup: 1996
- Korean League Cup: 1993
- Asian Club Championship: 1996–97, 1997–98

Sangmu FC

- Korean National Semipro League (Spring): 1994

Individual

- K League All-Star: 1992, 1998, 1999, 2000
- K League 1 Best XI: 1992
- Asian Club Championship top goalscorer: 1996–97

=== Manager ===
Yanbian Changbaishan

- China League One: 2015

Pohang Steelers

- Korea Cup: 2024

Individual

- China League One Coach of the Season: 2015
- K League Manager of the Month: March 2024
- K League All-Star: 2024
- Korea Cup Best Manager: 2024
