= Lee Moon-seok =

South Korean footballer (born 1971)

Personal information
- Date of birth: 26 March 1970 (age 56)
- Height: 1.75 m (5 ft 9 in)
- Position: Defender

College career
Years	Team	Apps	(Gls)
1989–1992	Incheon National University		

Senior career*
Years	Team	Apps	(Gls)
1993–1999	Ulsan Hyundai Horangi	94	(2)
2000	Busan Daewoo Royals	0	(0)

International career
1990–1992	South Korea U23		
- * Club domestic league appearances and goals

Lee Seung-hyeop (born 15 April 1971) is a South Korean footballer.

== Club career ==
He joined Ulsan Hyundai Horangi in 1993

He joined Busan Daewoo Royals in 2000.

== International career ==
He was part of the South Korea squad at the 1992 Olympics tournament.
