= Cho Keung-yeon =

South Korean footballer (born 1961)

Cho Keung-Yeon 조긍연
Personal information
- Full name: Cho Keung-Yeon
- Date of birth: March 18, 1961 (age 65)
- Place of birth: South Korea
- Position: Forward

Youth career
- 1983–1987: Korea University

Senior career*
Years	Team	Apps	(Gls)
1985–1991	POSCO Atoms	134	(34)
1992	Hyundai Horangi	8	(1)

International career^{‡}
1980–1989	South Korea	?	(?)

Managerial career
- 2000–?: Pohang Steelers (Coach)
- 2004–2012: Sun Moon University
- 2012–2013: Yanbian Baekdu Tigers
- * Club domestic league appearances and goals as of December 2, 2008 ‡ National team caps and goals as of December 2, 2008

Cho Keung-Yeon (Korean: 조긍연, born on March 18, 1961) is a former South Korea football player. he was top scorer of K-League in 1989.

== Honors and awards ==
=== Player ===
POSCO Atoms

- K-League Winners (1) : 1988

=== Individual ===
- K-League Regular Season Top Scorer Award (1): 1989
- K-League Best XI (1) : 1989
