= 1998 K League =

Hyundai Cup K League
- Season: 1998
- Dates: Regular season: 18 July – 14 October 1998; Championship: 17–31 October 1998
- Champions: Suwon Samsung Bluewings (1st title)
- Asian Club Championship: Suwon Samsung Bluewings
- Cup Winners' Cup: Anyang LG Cheetahs
- Matches played: 90
- Goals scored: 275 (3.06 per match)
- Best Player: Ko Jong-soo
- Top goalscorer: Yoo Sang-chul (14 goals)

The 1998 K League was the 16th season of South Korean professional football league, and was the first season to have been named the "K League". This season is called the "Renaissance of K League" in South Korea. Despite the poor performance of South Korea team at the 1998 FIFA World Cup, the 1998 season of K League recorded a total of 2 million spectators with young star players' popularity for the first time. The three most popular players of them Ko Jong-soo, Lee Dong-gook, and Ahn Jung-hwan were called the "K League Troika".

== Regular season ==
| Pos | Team | Pld | W | OW | PW | L | GF | GA | GD | Pts | Qualification |
|---|---|---|---|---|---|---|---|---|---|---|---|
| 1 | Suwon Samsung Bluewings | 18 | 9 | 1 | 2 | 6 | 33 | 22 | +11 | 31 | Qualification for the playoffs final |
| 2 | Ulsan Hyundai Horang-i | 18 | 8 | 1 | 2 | 7 | 37 | 26 | +11 | 28 | Qualification for the playoffs semi-final |
| 3 | Pohang Steelers | 18 | 8 | 2 | 0 | 8 | 34 | 23 | +11 | 28 | Qualification for the playoffs first round |
| 4 | Jeonnam Dragons | 18 | 8 | 1 | 0 | 9 | 21 | 20 | +1 | 26 | Qualification for the playoffs first round |
| 5 | Busan Daewoo Royals | 18 | 6 | 3 | 1 | 8 | 27 | 22 | +5 | 25 | |
| 6 | Jeonbuk Hyundai Dinos | 18 | 8 | 0 | 1 | 9 | 30 | 35 | −5 | 25 | |
| 7 | Bucheon SK | 18 | 7 | 1 | 1 | 9 | 28 | 32 | −4 | 24 | |
| 8 | Anyang LG Cheetahs | 18 | 6 | 2 | 1 | 9 | 28 | 28 | 0 | 23 | Qualification for the Cup Winners' Cup |
| 9 | Daejeon Citizen | 18 | 3 | 2 | 1 | 12 | 20 | 35 | −15 | 14 | |
| 10 | Cheonan Ilhwa Chunma | 18 | 3 | 0 | 2 | 13 | 17 | 32 | −15 | 11 | |

Source: RSSSF
Rules for classification: W) 3 points; WG) won with golden goal, 2 points; WP) won after penalty shoot-out, 1 point

== Championship playoffs ==
=== Bracket ===
First round
3 | Pohang Steelers (p) | 0 (5)
4 | Jeonnam Dragons | 0 (3)

Semi-final
2 | Ulsan Hyundai Horang-i (p) | 2 | 2 | 4 (4)
1R | Pohang Steelers | 3 | 1 | 4 (1)

Final
SF | Ulsan Hyundai Horang-i | 0 | 0 | 0
1 | Suwon Samsung Bluewings | 1 | 0 | 1

=== Final table ===
| Pos | Team | Qualification |
|---|---|---|
| 1 | Suwon Samsung Bluewings (C) | Qualification for the Asian Club Championship |
| 2 | Ulsan Hyundai Horang-i | |
| 3 | Pohang Steelers | |
| 4 | Jeonnam Dragons | |

Source: RSSSF
(C) Champions

== Awards ==
=== Main awards ===
| Award | Winner | Club |
|---|---|---|
| Most Valuable Player | (South Korea) Ko Jong-soo | Suwon Samsung Bluewings |
| Top goalscorer | (South Korea) Yoo Sang-chul | Ulsan Hyundai Horang-i |
| Top assist provider | (South Korea) Jung Jeong-soo | Ulsan Hyundai Horang-i |
| Rookie of the Year | (South Korea) Lee Dong-gook | Pohang Steelers |
| Manager of the Year | (South Korea) Kim Ho | Suwon Samsung Bluewings |
| Best Referee | (South Korea) Han Byung-hwa | — |

=== Best XI ===
| Position | Winner | Club |
|---|---|---|
| Goalkeeper | (South Korea) Kim Byung-ji | Ulsan Hyundai Horang-i |
| Defenders | (South Korea) An Ik-soo | Pohang Steelers |
| Defenders | (Brazil) Maciel | Jeonnam Dragons |
| Defenders | (South Korea) Lee Lim-saeng | Bucheon SK |
| Midfielders | (South Korea) Ko Jong-soo | Suwon Samsung Bluewings |
| Midfielders | (South Korea) Yoo Sang-chul | Ulsan Hyundai Horang-i |
| Midfielders | (South Korea) Baek Seung-chul | Pohang Steelers |
| Midfielders | (South Korea) Ahn Jung-hwan | Busan Daewoo Royals |
| Midfielders | (South Korea) Jung Jeong-soo | Ulsan Hyundai Horang-i |
| Forwards | (South Korea) Kim Hyun-seok | Ulsan Hyundai Horang-i |
| Forwards | (Federal Republic of Yugoslavia) Saša Drakulić | Suwon Samsung Bluewings |

== See also ==
- 1998 K League Championship
- 1998 Korean League Cup
- 1998 Korean League Cup (Supplementary Cup)
- 1998 Korean FA Cup
