= Lee In-jae =

South Korean footballer (born 1971)

Personal information
- Date of birth: January 2, 1967 (age 59)
- Place of birth: South Korea
- Height: 1.75 m (5 ft 9 in)
- Position: Forward

Youth career
- 1985–1988: Chung-Ang University

Senior career*
Years	Team	Apps	(Gls)
1989–1997	Lucky-Goldstar Hwangso; LG Cheetahs; Anyang LG Cheetahs	110	(10)

International career
1984	South Korea U20		
- * Club domestic league appearances and goals

- Lee In-jae
- Hangul: 이인재
- Hanja: 李仁載
- RR: I Injae
- MR: I Injae

Lee In-jae (Korean: 이인재; born October 1, 1971) is a former South Korean footballer who played as a forward.

Lee started his professional career at Lucky-Goldstar FC. He was in the squad of South Korea under-20 team in 1984.
