= Park Chang-hyun =

South Korean footballer and coach

Personal information
- Date of birth: June 8, 1966 (age 60)
- Place of birth: South Korea
- Position: Striker

Youth career
- Hanyang University

Senior career*
Years	Team	Apps	(Gls)
1989–1994	Pohang Atoms	85	(13)
1995–1996	Chunnam Dragons	3	(0)

Managerial career
- 1997–1999: Cheonggu High School (Coach)
- 2000–2006: Hanyang University (Coach)
- 2007: Hanyang University
- 2008–2010: Pohang Steelers (Coach)
- 2010: Pohang Steelers (Caretaker)
- * Club domestic league appearances and goals as of 1 June 2010

- Park Chang-hyun
- Hangul: 박창현
- RR: Bak Changhyeon
- MR: Pak Ch'anghyŏn

Park Chang-hyun (born June 8, 1966) is a South Korean football coach and former player.

== Managerial statistics ==
As of match played 1 March 2025

Managerial record by team and tenure
Team	Nat	From	To	Record				
Team	Nat	From	To	G	W	D	L	Win%
Pohang Steelers (Caretaker)	(South Korea)	11 May 2010	8 November 2010	24	7	9	8	29.17
Daegu	(South Korea)	23 April 2024	Present	35	11	10	14	31.43
Career Total				59	18	19	22	30.51
