= Jung Jeong-soo =

South Korean footballer

Jung Jeong-Soo
Personal information
- Full name: Jung Jeong-Soo
- Date of birth: November 20, 1969 (age 56)
- Place of birth: South Korea
- Height: 1.70 m (5 ft 7 in)
- Position: Midfielder

Youth career
- Korea University

Senior career*
Years	Team	Apps	(Gls)
1994–2003	Ulsan Hyundai Horangi	170	(23)
2008	Gyeongju Citizen FC		

Managerial career
- ?: Ulsan Nongseo Elementary School
- 2008–: Gyeongju Citizen FC (Player coach)
- * Club domestic league appearances and goals as of 17 August 2011 ‡ National team caps and goals as of 17 August 2011

- Jung Jeong-soo
- Hangul: 정정수
- RR: Jeong Jeongsu
- MR: Chŏng Chŏngsu

Jung Jeong-Soo (born November 20, 1969) is a South Korean footballer.

He graduated from Korea University. He was the K-League Top Assistor of 1998 season.

== Honours ==
=== Player ===
==== Club ====
Ulsan Hyundai Horangi

- K-League Winners (1): 1996

=== Individual ===
- K-League Top Assistor (1): 1998
- K-League Best XI (1): 1998
