= Kang Jae-soon =

South Korean footballer (born 1964)

Kang Jae-soon 강재순
Personal information
- Full name: Kang Jae-soon
- Date of birth: December 15, 1964 (age 61)
- Place of birth: South Korea
- Height: 1.69 m (5 ft 6 1/2 in)
- Position: Midfielder

Youth career
- 1983–1986: Sungkyunkwan University

Senior career*
Years	Team	Apps	(Gls)
1987–1995	Ulsan Hyundai	179	(25)

International career
1988	South Korea U-20	3	(0)
- * Club domestic league appearances and goals

- Kang Jae-soon
- Hangul: 강재순
- Hanja: 姜才淳
- RR: Gang Jaesun
- MR: Kang Chaesun

Kang Jae-soon (Korean: 강재순; born December 15, 1964) is a South Korean former footballer who played as a midfielder.

He started professional career at Ulsan Hyundai in 1987.

He was in the squad of South Korea U-20 in 1983 FIFA World Youth Championship

He was winner of K League Best XI in 1989 K League.
