= Kim Jong-kun =

South Korean footballer

Kim Jong-Kun
Personal information
- Full name: Kim Jong-Kun
- Date of birth: May 10, 1969 (age 57)
- Place of birth: South Korea
- Height: 1.83 m (6 ft 0 in)
- Position: Forward

Senior career*
Years	Team	Apps	(Gls)
1992–2000	Hyundai Horangi / Ulsan Hyundai Horangi	138	(33)
- * Club domestic league appearances and goals as of 27 December 2007 ‡ National team caps and goals as of 27 December 2007

Kim Jong-Kun (Korean: 김종건, born May 10, 1969, in South Korea) is a South Korean former footballer.

== Playing career ==
- 1994-2001 : Hyundai Horangi / Ulsan Hyundai Horangi

== Honours ==
- Club
  - K-League winners : 1996
- Player
  - K-League Cup : Top Scorer (1998, 1999)
  - Korean FA Cup : Top Scorer (1998)
