= AFC Champions League Elite =

Asian association football tournament for clubs

- Organiser(s): AFC
- Founded: 1967; 59 years ago (as Asian Champion Club Tournament)
- Region: Asia
- Teams: 32 (league stage)
- Qualifier for: FIFA Club World Cup; FIFA Intercontinental Cup
- Related competitions: AFC Champions League Two (2nd tier); AFC Challenge League (3rd tier)
- Current champions: (Saudi Arabia) Al-Ahli (2nd title)
- Most championships: (Saudi Arabia) Al-Hilal (4 titles)
- Website: www.the-afc.com
- 2026–27 AFC Champions League Elite

The AFC Champions League Elite (abbreviated as the ACL Elite) is an annual continental club football competition organised by the Asian Football Confederation, and contested by Asia's top-division football clubs. It is the most prestigious club competition in Asian football, played by the national league champions (and, for some nations, one or more runners-up) of their national associations.

Introduced in 1967 as the Asian Champion Club Tournament, the competition rebranded as AFC Champions League in 2002 following the merger of the Asian Club Championship, the Asian Cup Winners' Cup and the Asian Super Cup. It was rebranded again in 2024 to its current name.

A total of 32 clubs compete in the league stage of the competition, divided into East and West regions (16 teams each). The winner of the AFC Champions League Elite qualifies for the FIFA Intercontinental Cup and the FIFA Club World Cup, and also for the next edition of the AFC Champions League Elite league stage if they have not already qualified through their domestic performance.

The most successful club in the competition is Al-Hilal with a total of four titles. Al-Ahli are the current champions, having beaten Machida Zelvia 1–0 in the 2026 final for their second consecutive title.

== History ==
List of winners
Season	Winners
Asian Champion Club Tournament
1967	(Israel) Hapoel Tel Aviv
1969	(Israel) Maccabi Tel Aviv
1970	(Iran) Taj Tehran
1971	(Israel) Maccabi Tel Aviv (2)
Asian Club Championship
1985–86	(South Korea) Daewoo Royals
1986	(Japan) Furukawa Electric
1987	(Japan) Yomiuri FC
1988–89	(Qatar) Al-Sadd
1989–90	(China) Liaoning
1990–91	(Iran) Esteghlal (2)
1991	(Saudi Arabia) Al-Hilal
1992–93	(Iran) PAS Tehran
1993–94	(Thailand) Thai Farmers Bank
1994–95	(Thailand) Thai Farmers Bank (2)
1995	(South Korea) Ilhwa Chunma
1996–97	(South Korea) Pohang Steelers
1997–98	(South Korea) Pohang Steelers (2)
1998–99	(Japan) Júbilo Iwata
1999–2000	(Saudi Arabia) Al-Hilal (2)
2000–01	(South Korea) Suwon Samsung Bluewings
2001–02	(South Korea) Suwon Samsung Bluewings (2)
AFC Champions League
2002–03	(United Arab Emirates) Al Ain
2004	(Saudi Arabia) Al-Ittihad
2005	(Saudi Arabia) Al-Ittihad (2)
2006	(South Korea) Jeonbuk Hyundai Motors
2007	(Japan) Urawa Red Diamonds
2008	(Japan) Gamba Osaka
2009	(South Korea) Pohang Steelers (3)
2010	(South Korea) Seongnam Ilhwa Chunma (2)
2011	(Qatar) Al-Sadd (2)
2012	(South Korea) Ulsan Hyundai
2013	(China) Guangzhou Evergrande
2014	(Australia) Western Sydney Wanderers
2015	(China) Guangzhou Evergrande (2)
2016	(South Korea) Jeonbuk Hyundai Motors (2)
2017	(Japan) Urawa Red Diamonds (2)
2018	(Japan) Kashima Antlers
2019	(Saudi Arabia) Al-Hilal (3)
2020	(South Korea) Ulsan Hyundai (2)
2021	(Saudi Arabia) Al-Hilal (4)
2022	(Japan) Urawa Red Diamonds (3)
2023–24	(United Arab Emirates) Al Ain (2)
AFC Champions League Elite
2024–25	(Saudi Arabia) Al-Ahli
2025–26	(Saudi Arabia) Al-Ahli (2)

=== 1967–1972: Asian Champion Club Tournament ===
The Asian Football Confederation (AFC) first discussed launching a tournament for the champions of AFC nations in a meeting held on 21 April 1963, with its Secretary Lee Wai Tong announcing the AFC's intention to hold a competition similar to the European Cup. The competition started in 1967 as the Asian Champion Club Tournament and had a variety of different formats in its first few years, with the inaugural tournament staged as a straight knock-out format, and the following three editions consisting of a group stage.

While Israeli clubs dominated the first four editions of the competition, this was partly due to the refusal of Arab clubs to play them:

- In 1970, Lebanese club Homenetmen refused to play Hapoel Tel Aviv in the semi-final, which was scratched with Hapoel advancing to the final.
- In 1971, Aliyat Al-Shorta of Iraq refused to play Maccabi Tel Aviv on three occasions: in the preliminary round (which was redrawn), in the group stage, and then in the final, which was scratched with Maccabi being awarded the championship. During the award ceremony for Maccabi, Aliyat Al-Shorta players waved the Palestinian flag around the field, with a match being arranged by the AFC and the Thai FA between Maccabi and a Combined Bangkok team in lieu of the final. The Iraqi media considered Aliyat Al-Shorta as the tournament's winners, with the team holding an open top bus parade in Baghdad.

After the 1972 edition had to be cancelled by the AFC for various reasons, including two Arab clubs being excluded for refusing to commit to playing against Israeli club Maccabi Netanya, the AFC suspended the competition for 14 years, while Israel would be expelled from the AFC in 1974.

=== 1985–2002: Return as the Asian Club Championship ===
Asia's premier club tournament made its return in 1985 as the Asian Club Championship.

In 1990, the Asian Football Confederation introduced the Asian Cup Winners' Cup, a tournament for the cup winners of each AFC nation, while the 1995 season saw the introduction of the Asian Super Cup, with the winners of the Asian Club Championship and Asian Cup Winners' Cup playing against each other.

=== 2002–2024: AFC Champions League ===
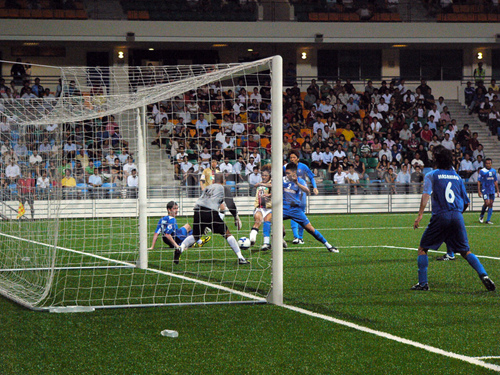
Japan's Kashima Antlers and Singapore's Warriors FC during a group stage game during the 2009 season at the Jalan Besar Stadium.

The 2002–03 season saw the Asian Club Championship, Asian Cup Winners' Cup and Asian Super Cup combine to become the AFC Champions League. League champions and cup winners would qualify for the qualifying playoffs with the best eight clubs from East Asia and the eight best clubs from West Asia progressing to the group stage. The first winners under the AFC Champions League name were Al-Ain, defeating BEC Tero Sasana 2–1 on aggregate. In 2004, 29 clubs from fourteen countries participated and the tournament schedule was changed to March–November.

In the group stage, the 28 clubs were divided into seven groups of four on a regional basis, separating East Asian and West Asian clubs to reduce travel costs, and the groups were played on a home and away basis. The seven group winners along with the defending champions qualified to the quarter-finals. The quarter-finals, semi-finals, and finals were played as a two-legged format, with away goals, extra time, and penalties used as tie-breakers.

==== Expansion ====
The 2005 season saw Syrian clubs join the competition, thus increasing the number of participating countries to 15, and two years later, following their transfer into the AFC in 2006, Australian clubs were also included in the tournament. However, many blamed the low prize money at that time and expensive travel cost as some of the reasons.

The Champions League was expanded to 32 clubs in 2009 with direct entry to the top ten Asian leagues. Each country received up to 4 slots, though no more than one-third of the number of teams in that country's top division, rounded downwards, depending on the strength of their league, professional league structure, marketability, financial status, as well as other criteria set by the AFC Pro-League Committee. The assessment criteria and ranking for participating associations are revised by AFC every two years.

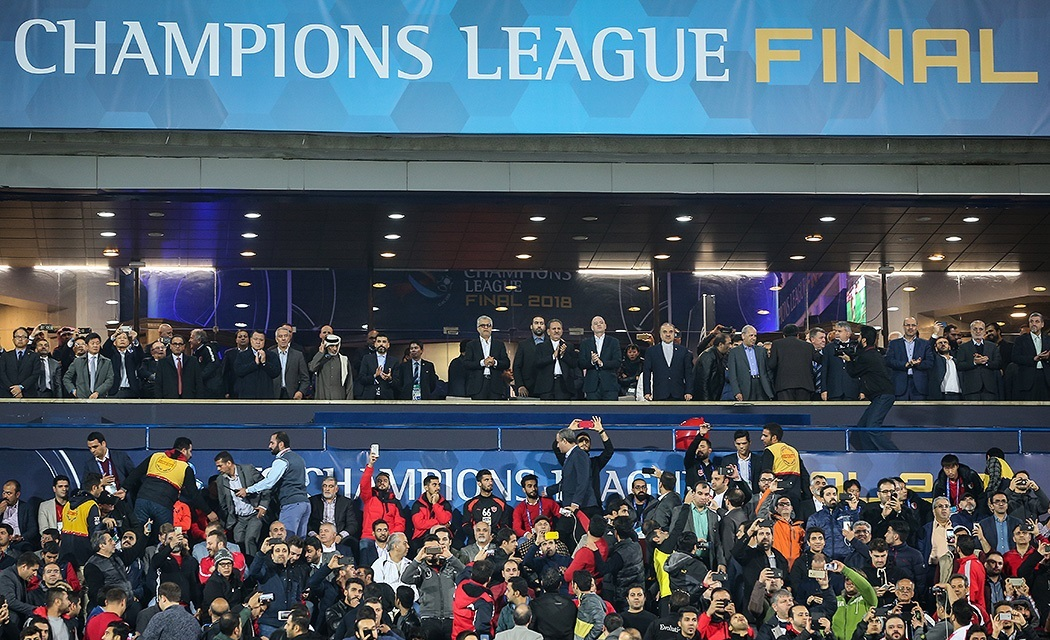
FIFA president Gianni Infantino and around 100,000 others watching the 2018 AFC Champions League Final at Azadi Stadium.

The old format saw the eight group winners and eight runners-up qualify to the round of 16, in which group winners played host to the runners-up in two-legged series, matched regionally, with away goals, extra time, and penalties used as tie-breakers. The regional restriction continues all the way until the final, although clubs from the same country couldn't face each other in the quarterfinals unless that country has three or more representatives in the quarterfinals. Since 2013, the final has also been held as a two-legged series, on a home and away basis.

In 2021, the group stage was expanded from 32 to 40 teams, with both the West and East Regions having five groups of four teams. The slot allocation for the top six member associations in each region remained unchanged. The 10 group winners and top 3 runners-up per region are now seeded based on a combination table for the round of 16, with the games still matched regionally until the final.

In February 2022, it was announced that the AFC Champions League would go back to an inter-year (autumn to spring) schedule starting with the 2023–24 season. In addition, the existing "3+1" rule for foreign players during matches (3 foreign players and 1 Asian foreigner) was expanded to "5+1" (5 foreign players and 1 Asian foreigner).

==== Women's rights in Iranian football ====
By 2021, the various problems with the Iranian sides were attracting media attention; international Arabic and English-language media reported the violation of women's rights in the stadiums of Iranian sides.

On top of that, Iranian women were banned from football stadiums for about 40 years, by the Iranian government. In 2019, Iranian women were first allowed to watch football at stadiums, but not during ACL games. Before that, FIFA had pressured Iran to let women into the stadiums; Iran relented, but capped the number of women to watch the 2018 final. In 2021, the AFC investigated the matter, in the hope of allowing unrestricted attendance whenever Iranian clubs are involved.

=== 2024–25 onwards: AFC Champions League Elite ===
In December 2022, the AFC announced that their club football structure would undergo an overhaul, with the top club competition shrinking from 40 teams in the main stage to 24 teams, divided into East and West regions (12 teams each), with each team in the East and West regions playing eight other teams from their region (four teams at home and four teams away). The top eight teams from each region would advance to the knockout stage, where only the round of 16 would be played over two legs, with all matches from the quarter-finals onward being played in a single-leg format at a centralised venue. In August 2023, it was confirmed that the new format would come into effect from the 2024–25 season, with the name of the competition changing to AFC Champions League Elite. The AFC has also confirmed that AFC Champions League records and statistics would be carried forward to the ACL Elite. Saudi Arabia were awarded hosting duties for the final stage for the first two seasons and provisionally for the following three seasons, subject to an AFC review.

Starting with the 2026–27 edition, the league stage expanded from 24 to 32 clubs (16 for each region).

== Format ==
=== Qualification ===
Map of AFC countries whose teams reached the group/league stage of the AFC Champions League Elite AFC member country that has been represented in the group/league stage AFC member country that has not been represented in the group/league stage

As of the 2026–27 edition of the tournament, the AFC Champions League Elite uses a league stage format of 32 teams, which is preceded by qualifying matches for teams that do not receive direct entry to the competition proper. Teams are also split into East and West zones.

The number of teams that each association enters into the AFC Champions League Elite is determined annually through criteria as set by the AFC Competitions Committee. The criteria, which is a modified version of the UEFA coefficient, measures such thing as marketability and stadia to determine the specific number of berths that an association receives. The higher an association's ranking as determined by the criteria, the more teams represent the association in the competition.

=== Tournament ===
The tournament proper begins with a league stage of 32 teams, which are split into two leagues (East and West), with each team playing against eight opponents from their league (four at home and four away).

The top eight teams from each league advance to the round of 16. In this phase, each club face another club from its region in a two-legged, home-and-away tie to decide which eight clubs progress to a centralised Finals tournament. If the aggregate score of the two games is tied after 180 minutes, the clubs play extra time. If still tied after extra time, the tie is decided by a penalty shoot-out.

The quarter-finals, semi-finals and final matches all feature cross-regional pairings, and are played in a single-leg format at centralised venue.

=== Allocation ===
Teams from 24 AFC countries have reached the group stage of the AFC Champions League Elite. The allocation of teams by member countries is listed below; asterisks represent occasions where at least one team was eliminated in qualification prior to the group stage. 32 AFC countries have had teams participate in qualification, and countries that have never had teams reach the group stage are not shown.

Associations	Entrants																							
Associations	2002–03	2004	2005	2006	2007	2008	2009	2010	2011	2012	2013	2014	2015	2016	2017	2018	2019	2020	2021	2022	2023–24	2024–25	2025–26	2026–27
East Asia
Australia	Part of OFC				2	2	2	2	2	3	1*	3	2*	2*	3	2*	2*	3	0	2*	1	1	1	1*
China PR	2	2	2	2	2	2	4	4	4	3	4	4	4	4	3*	4	4	4	2*	2	3*	3	3	2
Hong Kong	0*	0	0	0	0	0	0	0	0	0	0	0*	0*	0*	1*	1*	0*	0*	1	1	1*	0	0	0
Indonesia	0*	2	2	0	2	0	1*	1*	1*	0*	0	0	0*	0	0	0*	0*	0*	0	0	0*	0	0	0
Japan	2	2	2	2	2	3	4	4	4	4	4	4	4	4	4	4	4	3*	4	4	4	3	3	5
South Korea	2	2	2	2	3	2	4	4	4	4	4	4	4	4	4	4	4	4	4	4	4	3	3	3*
Malaysia	0	0	0	0	0	0	0	0	0	0	0	0	0*	0*	0*	0*	1*	1*	1	1	1	1	1	1
Philippines	0	0	0	0	0	0	0	0	0	0	0	0	0	0	0*	0*	0*	0*	2	1*	1	0	0	0
Singapore	0*	0	0	0	0	0	1	1	0	0	0	0*	0*	0*	0*	0*	0*	0*	1	1	1	0	0	0
Thailand	2	2	2	0	1	2	0*	0*	0*	1*	2	1*	1*	1*	1*	1*	1*	1*	4	2*	3*	1*	1*	3
Vietnam	0*	2	2	2	1	2	0	0*	0	0	0	0*	1*	1*	0*	0*	0*	0*	1	1	1*	0	0	1
Total	8	12	12	8	13	13	16	16	15	15	15	16	16	16	16	16	16	16	20	19	20	12	12	16
West Asia
Bahrain	0*	2	0	0	0	0	0	0	0	0	0	0*	0*	0	0	0*	0	0*	0*	0	0	0	0	0
India	0*	0	0	0	0	0	0*	0*	0*	0	0	0*	0*	0*	0*	0*	0*	0*	1	1	1	0	0	0
Iran	2	2	2	2	1	2	4	4	4	3*	3*	4	4	3*	4	4	3*	4	4	2	3*	2*	1*	2
Iraq	1*	2	2	2	2	2	0	0	0	0	0	0*	0	0	0	0	1*	1*	2*	1*	1	1	1	1
Jordan	0*	0	0	0	0	0	0	0	0	0	0	0*	0*	0*	0*	0*	0*	0*	1	1	1*	0	0	0*
Kuwait	0*	1	2	2	2	2	0	0	0	0	0	0*	0*	0	0	0	0*	0*	0*	0	0	0	0	0
Qatar	1*	2	2	2	2	2	2	2	3	4	4	4	2*	2*	2*	4	3*	2*	3*	4	2*	3	3	3
Saudi Arabia	1*	2	3	3	2	2	4	4	4	3*	4	4	4	4	4	2	4	4	3*	4	4	3	3	5
Syria	0*	0	2	2	2	2	0	0*	0*	0	0	0	0	0	0	0	0	0	0	0*	0	0	0	0
Tajikistan	0	0	0	0	0	0	0	0	0	0	0	0	0	0	0	0	0*	0*	1	1	1	0	0	0
Turkmenistan	1*	0	0	0	0	0	0	0	0	0	0	0	0	0	0	0	0	0	0	1	1	0	0	0
United Arab Emirates	1*	3	2	2	2	2	4	4	4	4	4	3*	2*	3*	4	4	3*	4	3*	3*	2*	2*	3	3*
Uzbekistan	1*	2	2	2	2	2	2	2	2	3*	2*	1*	4	4	2*	2*	2*	1*	2	2	4	1	1	2
Total	8	14	17	17	15	16	16	16	17	17	17	16	16	16	16	16	16	16	20	20	20	12	12	16
Total
Finals	16	26	29	25	28	29	32	32	32	32	32	32	32	32	32	32	32	32	40	39	40	24	24	32
Qualifying	53	26	29	25	28	29	35	37	36	37	35	47	49	45	47	46	51	52	45	46	53	27	26	36

== Prize money ==
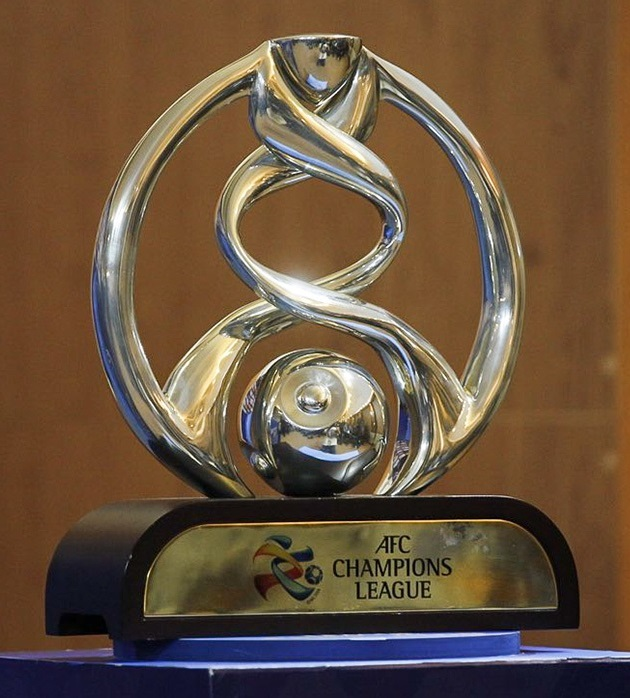
Tournament's trophy, used until 2024

Starting with the 2024–25 season, the distribution of the prize money is as follows:

Round	Teams	Amount	
Round	Teams	Per team	Total
Final (champions)	1	$10 million	
Final (runners-up)	1	$4 million	
Semi-finals	4	$600,000	$2.4 million
Quarter-finals	8	$400,000	$3.2 million
Round of 16	16	$200,000	$3.2 million
League stage	24	$800,000	$19.2 million
Total	24	$42 million	

== Trophy ==
Following the retirement of the AFC Champions League trophy in 2024, English luxury brand Thomas Lyte were commissioned to manufacture a new trophy.

The new trophy stands at 70 centimetres (28 in) tall and weighs 12 kilograms (26 lb), and is visually similar to its AFC Champions League Two counterpart.

== Marketing ==
=== Sponsorship ===
The AFC Champions League Elite is sponsored by a group of multinational corporations, in contrast to the single main sponsor typically found in national top-flight leagues.

Global Partners

- Neom
- Qatar Airways
- Visit Saudi

Global Supporters

- Alrajhi Bank
- Aspetar
- Kelme
- Midea
- Tecno Mobile
- Visa

=== Video game ===
The current license holder for the AFC Champions League video game is Konami with the eFootball series. The license also includes the competing teams.

== Records and statistics ==
=== Performance by club ===
Performances in the Asian Club Championship and AFC Champions League Elite by club
Club	Title(s)	Runners-up	Seasons won	Seasons runner-up
(Saudi Arabia) Al-Hilal	4	5	1991, 1999–2000, 2019, 2021	1986, 1987, 2014, 2017, 2022
(South Korea) Pohang Steelers	3	1	1996–97, 1997–98, 2009	2021
(Japan) Urawa Red Diamonds	3	1	2007, 2017, 2022	2019
(Iran) Esteghlal	2	2	1970, 1990–91	1991, 1998–99
(South Korea) Seongnam FC	2	2	1995, 2010	1996–97, 2004
(United Arab Emirates) Al Ain	2	2	2002–03, 2023–24	2005, 2016
(Saudi Arabia) Al-Ahli	2	2	2024–25, 2025–26	1985–86, 2012
(Saudi Arabia) Al-Ittihad	2	1	2004, 2005	2009
(South Korea) Jeonbuk Hyundai Motors	2	1	2006, 2016	2011
(Israel) Maccabi Tel Aviv	2	0	1969, 1971	—
(Qatar) Al-Sadd	2	0	1988–89, 2011	—
(Thailand) Thai Farmers Bank	2	0	1993–94, 1994–95	—
(South Korea) Suwon Samsung Bluewings	2	0	2000–01, 2001–02	—
(South Korea) Ulsan HD	2	0	2012, 2020	—
(China) Guangzhou	2	0	2013, 2015	—
(Japan) Júbilo Iwata	1	2	1998–99	1999–2000, 2000–01
(Israel) Hapoel Tel Aviv	1	1	1967	1970
(China) Liaoning	1	1	1989–90	1990–91
(South Korea) Busan IPark	1	0	1985–86	—
(Japan) JEF United Chiba	1	0	1986	—
(Japan) Tokyo Verdy	1	0	1987	—
(Iran) PAS Tehran	1	0	1992–93	—
(Japan) Gamba Osaka	1	0	2008	—
(Australia) Western Sydney Wanderers	1	0	2014	—
(Japan) Kashima Antlers	1	0	2018	—
(Japan) Yokohama F. Marinos	0	2	—	1989–90, 2023–24
(South Korea) FC Seoul	0	2	—	2001–02, 2013
(Iran) Persepolis	0	2	—	2018, 2020
(Malaysia) Selangor	0	1	—	1967
(South Korea) Yangzee	0	1	—	1969
(Iraq) Aliyat Al-Shorta	0	1	—	1971
(Iraq) Al-Rasheed	0	1	—	1988–89
(Saudi Arabia) Al-Shabab	0	1	—	1992–93
Oman Club	0	1	—	1993–94
(Qatar) Al-Arabi	0	1	—	1994–95
(Saudi Arabia) Al-Nassr	0	1	—	1995
(China) Dalian Shide	0	1	—	1997–98
(Thailand) Police Tero	0	1	—	2002–03
(Syria) Al-Karamah	0	1	—	2006
(Iran) Sepahan	0	1	—	2007
(Australia) Adelaide United	0	1	—	2008
(Iran) Zob Ahan	0	1	—	2010
(United Arab Emirates) Shabab Al-Ahli	0	1	—	2015
(Japan) Kawasaki Frontale	0	1	—	2024–25
(Japan) Machida Zelvia	0	1	—	2025–26

=== Performance by nation ===
Performances in finals by nation
Nation	Titles	Runners-up	Total
South Korea	12	7	19
Saudi Arabia	8	10	18
Japan	8	7	15
Iran	3	6	9
China	3	2	5
Israel	3	1	4
United Arab Emirates	2	3	5
Qatar	2	1	3
Thailand	2	1	3
Australia	1	1	2
Iraq	0	2	2
Malaysia	0	1	1
Oman	0	1	1
Syria	0	1	1

=== Performance by region ===
Zone	Federation (region)	Titles	Total
East Zone	EAFF (East Asia)	23	26
East Zone	AFF (Southeast Asia)	3	26
West Zone	WAFF (West Asia)	12	15
West Zone	CAFA (Central Asia)	3	15
West Zone	SAFF (South Asia)	0	15

Note: Israeli clubs, winners of the 1967, 1969 and 1971 editions, are not included.

== Awards ==
=== Most Valuable Player ===
Year	Player	Club	Ref.
1996–97	(South Korea) An Ik-soo	(South Korea) Pohang Steelers	
1997–98	(Saudi Arabia) Ahmed Al-Dokhi	(Saudi Arabia) Al-Hilal	
1998–99	(Burkina Faso) Seydou Traoré	(United Arab Emirates) Al Ain	
1999–2000	(Brazil) Sérgio Ricardo	(Saudi Arabia) Al-Hilal	
2000–01	(Federal Republic of Yugoslavia) Zoltan Sabo	(South Korea) Suwon Samsung Bluewings	
2001–02	—N/a		
2002–03	(Thailand) Therdsak Chaiman	(Thailand) BEC Tero Sasana	
2004	(Saudi Arabia) Redha Tukar	(Saudi Arabia) Al-Ittihad	
2005	(Saudi Arabia) Mohammed Noor	(Saudi Arabia) Al-Ittihad	
2006	(South Korea) Choi Jin-cheul	(South Korea) Jeonbuk Hyundai Motors	
2007	(Japan) Yuichiro Nagai	(Japan) Urawa Red Diamonds	
2008	(Japan) Yasuhito Endō	(Japan) Gamba Osaka	
2009	(South Korea) No Byung-jun	(South Korea) Pohang Steelers	
2010	(Australia) Sasa Ognenovski	(South Korea) Seongnam Ilhwa Chunma	
2011	(South Korea) Lee Dong-gook	(South Korea) Jeonbuk Hyundai Motors	
2012	(South Korea) Lee Keun-ho	(South Korea) Ulsan Hyundai	
2013	(Brazil) Muriqui	(China) Guangzhou Evergrande	
2014	(Australia) Ante Covic	(Australia) Western Sydney Wanderers	
2015	(Brazil) Ricardo Goulart	(China) Guangzhou Evergrande	
2016	(United Arab Emirates) Omar Abdulrahman	(United Arab Emirates) Al Ain	
2017	(Japan) Yōsuke Kashiwagi	(Japan) Urawa Red Diamonds	
2018	(Japan) Yuma Suzuki	(Japan) Kashima Antlers	
2019	(France) Bafétimbi Gomis	(Saudi Arabia) Al-Hilal	
2020	(South Korea) Yoon Bit-garam	(South Korea) Ulsan Hyundai	
2021	(Saudi Arabia) Salem Al-Dawsari	(Saudi Arabia) Al-Hilal	
2022	(Japan) Hiroki Sakai	(Japan) Urawa Red Diamonds	
2023–24	(Morocco) Soufiane Rahimi	(United Arab Emirates) Al Ain	
2024–25	(Brazil) Roberto Firmino	(Saudi Arabia) Al-Ahli	
2025–26	(Ivory Coast) Franck Kessié	(Saudi Arabia) Al-Ahli	

=== Top scorers ===
Year	Player	Club	Goals	Ref.
1996–97	(South Korea) Park Tae-ha	(South Korea) Pohang Steelers	3 (Note: Final tournament goals only.)	
2002–03	(China) Hao Haidong	(China) Dalian Shide	9	
2004	(South Korea) Kim Do-hoon	(South Korea) Seongnam Ilhwa Chunma	9	
2005	(Sierra Leone) Mohamed Kallon	(Saudi Arabia) Al-Ittihad	6	
2006	(Brazil) Magno Alves	(Japan) Gamba Osaka	8	
2007	(Brazil) Mota	(South Korea) Seongnam Ilhwa Chunma	7	
2008	(Thailand) Nantawat Tansopa	(Thailand) Krung Thai Bank	9	
2009	(Brazil) Leandro	(Japan) Gamba Osaka	10	
2010	(Brazil) Jose Mota	(South Korea) Suwon Samsung Bluewings	9	
2011	(South Korea) Lee Dong-gook	(South Korea) Jeonbuk Hyundai Motors	9	
2012	(Brazil) Ricardo Oliveira	(United Arab Emirates) Al-Jazira	12	
2013	(Brazil) Muriqui	(China) Guangzhou Evergrande	13	
2014	(Ghana) Asamoah Gyan	(United Arab Emirates) Al Ain	12	
2015	(Brazil) Ricardo Goulart	(China) Guangzhou Evergrande	8	
2016	(Brazil) Adriano	(South Korea) FC Seoul	13	
2017	(Syria) Omar Kharbin	(Saudi Arabia) Al-Hilal	10	
2018	(Algeria) Baghdad Bounedjah	(Qatar) Al-Sadd	13	
2019	(France) Bafétimbi Gomis	(Saudi Arabia) Al-Hilal	11	
2020	(Morocco) Abderrazak Hamdallah	(Saudi Arabia) Al-Nassr	7	
2021	(Kenya) Michael Olunga	(Qatar) Al-Duhail	9	
2022	(Belgium) Edmilson Junior	(Qatar) Al-Duhail	8	
2023–24	(Morocco) Soufiane Rahimi	(United Arab Emirates) Al Ain	13	
2024–25	(Saudi Arabia) Salem Al-Dawsari	(Saudi Arabia) Al-Hilal	10	
2025–26	(Spain) Rafa Mújica	(Qatar) Al-Sadd	8	

== See also ==
- AFC Champions League Two
- AFC Challenge League
- Continental football championships
- List of association football competitions
