= 1992 K League =

Korean Professional Football League
- Season: 1992
- Dates: 28 March – 18 November 1992
- Champions: POSCO Atoms (3rd title)
- Asian Club Championship: Withdrew
- Matches: 90
- Goals: 186 (2.07 per match)
- Best Player: Hong Myung-bo
- Top goalscorer: Lim Keun-jae (10 goals)
- Best goalkeeper: Valeri Sarychev

The 1992 Korean Professional Football League was the tenth season of K League since its establishment in 1983.

== Foreign players ==
Team	Player 1	Player 2	Former player (s)
Daewoo Royals	(Federal Republic of Yugoslavia) Nebojša Vučićević		
Hyundai Horang-i	(Russia) Mikhail Solovyov		(Germany) Frank Lieberam
Ilhwa Chunma	(Tajikistan) Valeri Sarychev		
LG Cheetahs	(Uruguay) Arsenio Luzardo		
POSCO Atoms	(Federal Republic of Yugoslavia) Rade Bogdanović	(Turkmenistan) Sergei Agashkov	
Yukong Elephants	(Bulgaria) Filip Filipov	(Poland) Witold Bendkowski	(Poland) Krzysztof Kasztelan

== League table ==
Pos	Team	Pld	W	D	L	GF	GA	GD	Pts
1	POSCO Atoms (C)	30	13	9	8	32	28	+4	35
2	Ilhwa Chunma	30	10	14	6	27	21	+6	34
3	Hyundai Horang-i	30	13	6	11	38	31	+7	32
4	LG Cheetahs	30	8	13	9	30	35	−5	29
5	Daewoo Royals	30	7	14	9	26	33	−7	28
6	Yukong Elephants	30	7	8	15	33	38	−5	22

Source: RSSSF
(C) Champions

== Awards ==
=== Main awards ===
Award	Winner	Club
Most Valuable Player	(South Korea) Hong Myung-bo	POSCO Atoms
Top goalscorer	(South Korea) Lim Keun-jae	LG Cheetahs
Top assist provider	(South Korea) Shin Dong-chul	Yukong Elephants
Rookie of the Year	(South Korea) Shin Tae-yong	Ilhwa Chunma
Manager of the Year	(South Korea) Lee Hoe-taik	POSCO Atoms
Best Defender/Goalkeeper	(Tajikistan) Valeri Sarychev	Ilhwa Chunma
Fighting Spirit Award	(South Korea) Park Chang-hyun	POSCO Atoms
Exemplary Award	(South Korea) Lee Tae-ho	Daewoo Royals
Best Referee	(South Korea) Noh Byung-il	—

=== Best XI ===
Position	Winner	Club
Goalkeeper	(Tajikistan) Valeri Sarychev	Ilhwa Chunma
Defenders	(South Korea) Hong Myung-bo	POSCO Atoms
Defenders	(South Korea) Lee Jong-hwa	Ilhwa Chunma
Defenders	(South Korea) Park Jung-bae	LG Cheetahs
Midfielders	(South Korea) Shin Hong-gi	Hyundai Horang-i
Midfielders	(South Korea) Kim Hyun-Seok	Hyundai Horang-i
Midfielders	(South Korea) Shin Tae-yong	Ilhwa Chunma
Midfielders	(South Korea) Park Tae-ha	POSCO Atoms
Midfielders	(South Korea) Shin Dong-chul	Yukong Elephants
Forwards	(South Korea) Park Chang-hyun	POSCO Atoms
Forwards	(South Korea) Lim Keun-jae	LG Cheetahs

== See also ==
- 1992 Korean League Cup
