= 1989 K League =

Korean Professional Football League
- Season: 1989
- Dates: 25 March – 28 October 1989
- Champions: Yukong Elephants (1st title)
- Asian Club Championship: Withdrew
- Cup Winners' Cup: Daewoo Royals
- Matches: 120
- Goals: 275 (2.29 per match)
- Best Player: Noh Soo-jin
- Top goalscorer: Cho Keung-yeon (20 goals)
- Best goalkeeper: Cha Sang-kwang
- Highest scoring: Hyundai 3–4 POSCO (21 October 1989)

The 1989 Korean Professional Football League was the seventh season of K League since its establishment in 1983. The Korean Professional Football Committee was merged into the Korea Football Association again in March 1989.

== Foreign players ==
Team	Player 1	Player 2
Daewoo Royals		
Hyundai Horang-i		
Ilhwa Chunma		
Lucky-Goldstar Hwangso		
POSCO Atoms		
Yukong Elephants	(Poland) Leszek Iwanicki	(Poland) Tadeusz Świątek

== League table ==
Pos	Team	Pld	W	D	L	GF	GA	GD	Pts	Qualification
1	Yukong Elephants (C)	40	17	15	8	51	40	+11	49	
2	Lucky-Goldstar Hwangso	40	15	17	8	53	40	+13	47	
3	Daewoo Royals	40	14	14	12	44	44	0	42	Qualification for the Cup Winners' Cup (Note: Qualified as champions of the Korean National Football Championship.)
4	POSCO Atoms	40	13	14	13	49	50	−1	40	
5	Ilhwa Chunma	40	6	21	13	44	52	−8	33	
6	Hyundai Horang-i	40	7	15	18	34	49	−15	29	

Source: RSSSF
(C) Champions

== Awards ==
=== Main awards ===
Award	Winner	Club
Most Valuable Player	(South Korea) Noh Soo-jin	Yukong Elephants
Top goalscorer	(South Korea) Cho Keung-yeon	POSCO Atoms
Top assist provider	(South Korea) Lee Heung-sil	POSCO Atoms
Rookie of the Year	(South Korea) Ko Jeong-woon	Ilhwa Chunma
Manager of the Year	(South Korea) Kim Jung-nam	Yukong Elephants
Best Goalkeeper	(South Korea) Cha Sang-kwang	Lucky-Goldstar Hwangso
Fighting Spirit Award	(South Korea) Cho Keung-yeon	POSCO Atoms
Exemplary Award	(South Korea) Kang Jae-soon	Hyundai Horang-i

=== Best XI ===
Position	Winner	Club
Goalkeeper	(South Korea) Cha Sang-kwang	Lucky-Goldstar Hwangso
Defenders	(South Korea) Lim Jong-heon	Ilhwa Chunma
Defenders	(South Korea) Cho Yoon-hwan	Yukong Elephants
Defenders	(South Korea) Choi Yun-kyum	Yukong Elephants
Defenders	(South Korea) Lee Young-ik	Lucky-Goldstar Hwangso
Midfielders	(South Korea) Lee Heung-sil	POSCO Atoms
Midfielders	(South Korea) Cho Duck-je	Daewoo Royals
Midfielders	(South Korea) Kang Jae-soon	Hyundai Horang-i
Forwards	(South Korea) Yoon Sang-chul	Lucky-Goldstar Hwangso
Forwards	(South Korea) Cho Keung-yeon	POSCO Atoms
Forwards	(South Korea) Noh Soo-jin	Yukong Elephants
