= Serhiy Konovalov =

Ukrainian footballer and coach (born 1972)

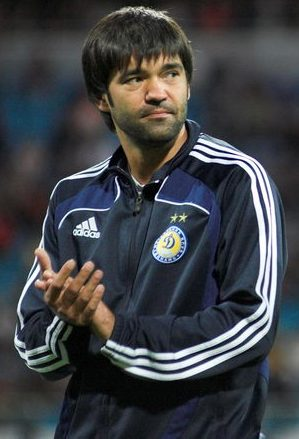

Personal information
- Full name: Serhiy Borysovych Konovalov
- Date of birth: 1 March 1972 (age 54)
- Place of birth: Poltava, Ukrainian SSR
- Height: 1.80 m (5 ft 11 in)
- Position: Attacking midfielder

Youth career
- ?–1989: Regional sports boarding school Dnipropetrovsk

Senior career*
Years	Team	Apps	(Gls)
1990–1994	Dnipro Dnipropetrovsk	108	(29)
1995–2001	Dynamo Kyiv	54	(12)
1996–1998	→ Pohang Steelers (loan)	52	(14)
1998–2001	→ Dynamo-2 Kyiv	51	(17)
1998–2001	→ Dynamo-3 Kyiv	7	(1)
2001	→ Dnipro Dnipropetrovsk (loan)	4	(0)
2001	→ Dnipro-2 Dnipropetrovsk (loan)	2	(0)
2001	→ Dnipro-3 Dnipropetrovsk (loan)	1	(0)
2001–2002	→ Beitar Jerusalem (loan)	27	(1)
2002–2005	Arsenal Kyiv	40	(8)
2003	→ Arsenal-2 Kyiv	1	(0)
2004	→ Borysfen Boryspil (loan)	8	(0)
2004	→ Boreks-Borysfen Borodianka (loan)	1	(0)
2004	→ Qingdao Beilaite (loan)	6	(1)
2006	Inter Baku	7	(0)
2008–2009	Irpin Horenychi		

International career
1992	CIS U-21	2	(0)
1993–2003	Ukraine	22	(3)

Managerial career
- 2011–2013: FC Sevastopol (assistant)
- 2013–2014: FC Sevastopol (interim)
- 2015: FC Naftovyk-Ukrnafta Okhtyrka (assistant)
- 2016: FC Ternopil (assistant)
- 2017–: FC Poltava (assistant)
Medal record
Men's football
Representing Soviet Union
FIFA World Youth Championship
Bronze medal – third place	1991 Portugal
- * Club domestic league appearances and goals

Serhiy Borysovych Konovalov (Ukrainian: Сергій Борисович Коновалов; born 1 March 1972) is a Ukrainian current football coach and former football midfielder.

== Career ==
Konovalov is a product of the Dnipro Higher School of Physical Culture (formerly Dnipropetrovsk Regional sport boarding school).

He capped for USSR Youth Team in 1991 FIFA World Youth Championship.

Konovalov was the first player to score in a competitive match for the Ukraine national team, as he netted after 29 minutes in their third UEFA Euro 1996 qualifying Group 4 match against Estonia, following a 2–0 loss to Lithuania and a 0–0 draw with Slovenia. The match finished 3-0 thanks to an Urmas Kirs own goal and a goal from Timerlan Huseinov. Ukraine eventually finished 4th in the group and failed to qualify for the tournament. Was married. He is now in civil marriage. Three children: Nikita Konovalov, Sonia Konovalova, Nazarii Konovalov.

He played domestically for Dnipro Dnipropetrovsk, Dynamo Kyiv, Arsenal Kyiv and Borysfen Boryspil, as well as for South Korean club Pohang Steelers, Israeli club Beitar Jerusalem, Chinese club Qingdao Beilaite and Azerbaijani club Inter Baku.

== International career ==
=== International goals ===
Results list Ukraine's goal tally first.

No.	Date	Venue	Opponent	Score	Result	Competition
1	27 April 1993	Chornomorets Stadium, Odesa, Ukraine	Israel	1–1	1–1	Friendly
2	13 November 1994	Olympic Stadium, Kyiv, Ukraine	Estonia	1–0	3–0	UEFA Euro 1996 qualification
3	20 March 1999	Boris Paichadze National Stadium, Tbilisi, Georgia	Georgia	1–0	1–0	Friendly

== Coaching career ==
Konovalov in July 2011 joined FC Sevastopol as assistant coach. On 27 November 2013 he was appointed as interim coach of FC Sevastopol.
