= Baek Seung-chul =

South Korean footballer (born 1975)

Personal information
- Date of birth: March 9, 1975 (age 51)
- Place of birth: South Korea
- Height: 1.78 m (5 ft 10 in)

Senior career*
Years	Team	Apps	(Gls)
1998–1999	Pohang Steelers	39	(18)
- * Club domestic league appearances and goals as of December 2, 2008 ‡ National team caps and goals as of December 2, 2008

- Baek Seung-chul
- Hangul: 백승철
- Hanja: 白承哲
- RR: Baek Seungcheol
- MR: Paek Sŭngch'ŏl

Baek Seung-chul (Korean: 백승철; born on March 9, 1975) is a former South Korea football player. He was winner of K League Best XI in 1998. He was famous of wanders goal in 1998 K League playoff, but he retired because of serious injury.
