= Professional Football Championship (South Korea) =

Tournament details
- Country: South Korea
- Dates: 5 May – 17 September 1986
- Teams: 5

Final positions
- Champions: Hyundai Horang-i (1st title)
- Runner-up: Daewoo Royals

Tournament statistics
- Matches played: 40
- Goals scored: 78 (1.95 per match)
- Top goal scorer(s): Ham Hyun-gi (9 goals)

Awards
- Best player: Choi Kang-hee

The Professional Football Championship was the first competition of the Korean League Cup. It was contested between five K League clubs in 1986.

== Table ==
Pos	Team	Pld	W	D	L	GF	GA	GD	Pts
1	Hyundai Horang-i (C)	16	10	3	3	24	9	+15	23
2	Daewoo Royals	16	7	2	7	15	13	+2	16
3	Yukong Elephants	16	4	7	5	10	16	−6	15
4	POSCO Atoms	16	6	1	9	15	18	−3	13
5	Lucky-Goldstar Hwangso	16	4	5	7	14	22	−8	13

Source: RSSSF
(C) Champions

== Results ==
May 5

Lucky-Goldstar Hwangso	0–0	POSCO Atoms

Chuncheon Sports Complex
Attendance: 3,200

May 5

Daewoo Royals	1–0	Hyundai Horang-i
Kim Jun-hyun 38'

Chuncheon Sports Complex
Attendance: 3,200

May 7

Lucky-Goldstar Hwangso	0–1	Daewoo Royals
		Gu Sang-bum 14'

Chuncheon Sports Complex
Attendance: 3,494

May 7

POSCO Atoms	1–0	Yukong Elephants
Cho Keung-yeon 5'

Chuncheon Sports Complex
Attendance: 3,494

May 11

Hyundai Horang-i	1–0	Yukong Elephants
Lee Sang-chul 58'

Masan Sports Complex
Attendance: 1,000

May 11

Daewoo Royals	2–0	POSCO Atoms
Kim Jun-hyun 32'; Ahn Gi-chul 36'

Masan Sports Complex
Attendance: 1,000

May 14

Yukong Elephants	0–3	Daewoo Royals
		Kim Jun-hyun 36'; Im Go-seok 66'; Choi Tae-jin 85' (pen.)

Masan Sports Complex
Attendance: 1,100

May 14

Hyundai Horang-i	2–0	Lucky-Goldstar Hwangso
Ham Hyun-gi 27'; Kim Jong-kun 64'

Masan Sports Complex
Attendance: 1,100

May 18

Yukong Elephants	1–0	Lucky-Goldstar Hwangso
Maeng Su-il 56'

Gyeongju Sports Complex
Attendance: 1,067

May 18

POSCO Atoms	0–1	Hyundai Horang-i
		Ham Hyun-gi 72'

Gyeongju Sports Complex
Attendance: 1,067

May 25f

Hyundai Horang-i	1–0	Daewoo Royals
Ham Hyun-gi 59'

Pohang Stadium
Attendance: 2,200

May 25

POSCO Atoms	4–2	Lucky-Goldstar Hwangso
Cho Keung-yeon 2', 77'; Paulinho Criciúma 24'; Kim Wan-su 66'		Piyapong 36'; Park Hang-seo 71'

Pohang Stadium
Attendance: 2,200

May 28

Yukong Elephants	0–3	POSCO Atoms
		Lee Heung-sil 14'; Paulinho Criciúma 47'; Kim Wan-su 53'

Pohang Stadium
Attendance: 2,366

May 28

Daewoo Royals	0–2	Lucky-Goldstar Hwangso
		Park Hang-seo 65'; Gu Sang-bum 68'

Pohang Stadium
Attendance: 2,366

May 31

POSCO Atoms	2–1	Daewoo Royals
Cho Keung-yeon 14'; Paulinho Criciúma 65'		Kwak Chang-kyu 78'

Dongdaemun Stadium
Attendance: 947

May 31

Yukong Elephants	1–1	Hyundai Horang-i
Gu Bon-seok 56'		Lee Sang-chul 56'

Dongdaemun Stadium
Attendance: 947

June 4

Lucky-Goldstar Hwangso	1–1	Hyundai Horang-i
Gu Sang-bum 44'		Ham Hyun-gi 20'

Incheon Sungui Stadium
Attendance: 190

June 4

Daewoo Royals	1–1	Yukong Elephants
Choi Tae-jin 65'		Shin Dong-chul 39'

Incheon Sungui Stadium
Attendance: 190

June 8

Lucky-Goldstar Hwangso	0–0	Yukong Elephants

Wonju Sports Complex
Attendance: 5,299

June 8

Hyundai Horang-i	0–0	POSCO Atoms

Wonju Sports Complex
Attendance: 5,299

June 28

Hyundai Horang-i	0–0	Yukong Elephants

Gangneung Sports Complex
Attendance: 2,000

June 28

Daewoo Royals	1–0	POSCO Atoms
Lee Tae-ho 80'

Gangneung Sports Complex
Attendance: 2,000

July 2

Yukong Elephants	1–1	Daewoo Royals
Noh Soo-jin 79'		Jung Yong-hwan 26'

Gangneung Sports Complex
Attendance: 2,000

July 2

Hyundai Horang-i	3–2	Lucky-Goldstar Hwangso
Kim Sam-soo 37' (pen.); Ham Hyun-ki 56'; Lee Sang-chul 63'		Cho Young-jeung 12'; Park Hang-seo 84'

Gangneung Sports Complex
Attendance: 2,000

July 6

POSCO Atoms	1–4	Hyundai Horang-i
Kim Wan-su 89'		Park Kyung-hoon 41' (o.g.); Huh Jung-moo 54'; Kim Jong-kun 84'; Baek Jong-chul 89'

Gangneung Sports Complex
Attendance: 1,826

July 6

Yukong Elephants	2–2	Lucky-Goldstar Hwangso
Min Jin-hong 9'; Gu Bon-seok 80'		Lee Sang-rae 70'; Park Hang-seo 88'

Gangneung Sports Complex
Attendance: 1,826

August 24

Hyundai Horang-i	1–0	Daewoo Royals
Lee Sang-chul 67'

Uijeongbu Sports Complex
Attendance: 6,000

August 24

POSCO Atoms	0–1	Lucky-Goldstar Hwangso
		Gu Sang-bum 36'

Uijeongbu Sports Complex
Attendance: 6,000

August 31

POSCO Atoms	1–2	Daewoo Royals
Choi Sang-gook 32'		Ahn Gi-chul 26'; Im Go-seok 89'

Incheon Sungui Stadium
Attendance: 600

August 31

Yukong Elephants	0–2	Hyundai Horang-i
		Ham Hyun-gi 59', 89'

Incheon Sungui Stadium
Attendance: 600

September 4

Lucky-Goldstar Hwangso	1–4	Hyundai Horang-i
Park Hang-seo 78' (pen.)		Ham Hyun-gi 7' (pen.), 51'; Kim Jong-hwan 58'; Baek Jong-chul 75'

Incheon Sungui Stadium
Attendance: 668

September 4

Daewoo Royals	0–1	Yukong Elephants
		Gu Bon-seok 36'

Incheon Sungui Stadium
Attendance: 668

September 7

Lucky-Goldstar Hwangso	1–1	Yukong Elephants
Lee Sang-rae 89'		Chu Jong-ho 89'

Gangneung Sports Complex
Attendance: 3,814

September 7

Hyundai Horang-i	2–0	POSCO Atoms
Lee Jong-hwa 54'; Kim Heung-kwon 74'

Gangneung Sports Complex
Attendance: 3,814

September 11

Lucky-Goldstar Hwangso	0–3	POSCO Atoms
		Sim Kyu-seon 44'; Baek Nam-su 78'; Lee Kil-yong 80'

Jeonju Sports Complex
Attendance: 400

September 11

Daewoo Royals	2–1	Hyundai Horang-i
Im Go-seok 12'; Lee Chun-heung 33'		Son Hyung-sun 49' (o.g.)

Jeonju Sports Complex
Attendance: 400

September 14

Lucky-Goldstar Hwangso	1–0	Daewoo Royals
Lee Jae-hee 38' (o.g.)

Jeonju Sports Complex
Attendance: 488

September 14

POSCO Atoms	0–1	Yukong Elephants
		Baek Hyun-young 49'

Jeonju Sports Complex
Attendance: 488

September 17

Yukong Elephants	1–0	POSCO Atoms
Baek Hyun-young 37'

Uijeongbu Sports Complex
Attendance: 2,702

September 17

Daewoo Royals	1–0	Lucky-Goldstar Hwangso
Yeo Bum-kyu 76'

Uijeongbu Sports Complex
Attendance: 2,702

== Awards ==
Award	Player	Team	Points
Best Player	(South Korea) Choi Kang-hee	Hyundai Horang-i	—
Top goalscorer	(South Korea) Ham Hyun-gi	Hyundai Horang-i	9 goals
Top assist provider	(South Korea) Jeon Young-soo	Hyundai Horang-i	4 assists

== See also ==
- 1986 K League
