= 1993 K League =

Korean Professional Football League
- Season: 1993
- Dates: 27 March – 16 October 1993
- Champions: Ilhwa Chunma (1st title)
- Asian Club Championship: Ilhwa Chunma
- Matches: 90
- Goals: 166 (1.84 per match)
- Best Player: Lee Sang-yoon
- Top goalscorer: Cha Sang-hae (10 goals)

The 1993 Korean Professional Football League was the eleventh season of K League since its establishment in 1983.

== Foreign players ==
Team	Player 1	Player 2	Player 3	Player 4	Former player (s)
Daewoo Royals	(Argentina) Rubén Bernuncio	(Federal Republic of Yugoslavia) Aleksandar Jozević	(Federal Republic of Yugoslavia) Nebojša Vučićević	(Russia) Almir Kayumov	(Argentina) Hugo Smaldone
Hyundai Horang-i	(Federal Republic of Yugoslavia) Goran Jevtić	(Federal Republic of Yugoslavia) Zoran Vukčević			
Ilhwa Chunma	(Tajikistan) Valeri Sarychev				
LG Cheetahs					(Uruguay) Arsenio Luzardo
POSCO Atoms	(Federal Republic of Yugoslavia) Rade Bogdanović	(Federal Republic of Yugoslavia) Zoran Kuntić			
Yukong Elephants	(Bulgaria) Filip Filipov	(Bulgaria) Slavchev Toshev			

== League table ==
Pos	Team	Pld	W	PW	PL	L	GF	GA	GD	Pts	Qualification
1	Ilhwa Chunma (C)	30	13	5	6	6	35	23	+12	68	Qualification for the Asian Club Championship
2	LG Cheetahs	30	10	8	3	9	28	29	−1	59	
3	Hyundai Horang-i	30	10	6	4	10	22	22	0	56	
4	POSCO Atoms	30	8	6	8	8	34	29	+5	52	
5	Yukong Elephants	30	7	7	6	10	25	31	−6	48	
6	Daewoo Royals	30	5	5	10	10	22	32	−10	40	

Source: RSSSF
(C) Champion

== Awards ==
=== Main awards ===
Award	Winner	Club
Most Valuable Player	(South Korea) Lee Sang-yoon	Ilhwa Chunma
Top goalscorer	(South Korea) Cha Sang-hae	POSCO Atoms
Top assist provider	(South Korea) Yoon Sang-chul	LG Cheetahs
Rookie of the Year	(South Korea) Jung Kwang-seok	Daewoo Royals
Manager of the Year	(South Korea) Park Jong-hwan	Ilhwa Chunma
Best Defender/Goalkeeper	(South Korea) Lee Jong-hwa	Ilhwa Chunma
Fighting Spirit Award	(South Korea) Yoon Sang-chul	LG Cheetahs
Exemplary Award	(South Korea) Choi Young-il	Hyundai Horang-i

=== Best XI ===
Position	Winner	Club
Goalkeeper	(Tajikistan) Valeri Sarychev	Ilhwa Chunma
Defenders	(South Korea) Choi Young-il	Hyundai Horang-i
Defenders	(South Korea) Lee Jong-hwa	Ilhwa Chunma
Defenders	(South Korea) Yoo Dong-kwan	POSCO Atoms
Midfielders	(South Korea) Kim Pan-keun	Daewoo Royals
Midfielders	(South Korea) Shin Tae-yong	Ilhwa Chunma
Midfielders	(South Korea) Kim Dong-hae	LG Cheetahs
Midfielders	(South Korea) Lee Sang-yoon	Ilhwa Chunma
Midfielders	(South Korea) Kim Bong-gil	Yukong Elephants
Forwards	(South Korea) Cha Sang-hae	POSCO Atoms
Forwards	(South Korea) Yoon Sang-chul	LG Cheetahs

== See also ==
- 1993 Korean League Cup
