= 1992 Korean League Cup =

1992 Adidas Cup
Tournament details
- Country: South Korea
- Dates: 3 June – 28 November 1992
- Teams: 6

Final positions
- Champions: Ilhwa Chunma (1st title)
- Runners-up: LG Cheetahs

Tournament statistics
- Matches played: 32
- Goals scored: 70 (2.19 per match)
- Top goal scorer: Noh Soo-jin (5 goals)

The 1992 Korean League Cup, also known as the Adidas Cup 1992, was the second competition of the Korean League Cup. Ilhwa Chunma became the champions.

== League ==
=== Table ===
Pos	Team	Pld	W	PW	PL	L	GF	GA	GD	Pts	Qualification
1	Ilhwa Chunma	10	3	4	1	2	11	10	+1	16	Advance to the final
2	LG Cheetahs	10	4	1	2	3	15	11	+4	15.5	Advance to the final
3	POSCO Atoms	10	3	2	3	2	15	12	+3	15	
4	Yukong Elephants	10	4	2	0	4	12	14	−2	15	
5	Hyundai Horang-i	10	3	1	1	5	10	13	−3	11.5	
6	Daewoo Royals	10	2	1	4	3	7	10	−3	11.5	

Source: RSSSF

=== Matches ===
June 3
17:00 UTC+9

Yukong Elephants	2–1	Hyundai Horang-i
Noh Soo-jin 24'; Lee Kwang-jong 74'		Kim Hyun-seok 89' (pen.)

Dongdaemun Stadium
Attendance: 13,000

June 3
19:00 UTC+9

Ilhwa Chunma	1–1	Daewoo Royals
Park Du-heung 52'		Lee Tae-ho 37'
Penalties
	3–2

Dongdaemun Stadium
Attendance: 18,000

June 3
19:00 UTC+9

POSCO Atoms	1–1	LG Cheetahs
Agashkov 18'		Cho Min-kook 16'
Penalties
	1–4

Steelyard Stadium
Attendance: 20,000

June 17
19:00 UTC+9

POSCO Atoms	2–2	Yukong Elephants
Park Tae-ha 17', 41'		Shin Dong-chul 80'; Noh Soo-jin 87'
Penalties
	3–4

Steelyard Stadium
Attendance: 11,280

June 17
19:00 UTC+9

Ilhwa Chunma	2–2	Hyundai Horang-i
Lee Sang-yoon 64', 73'		Lieberam 17'; Heo Gi-su 38'
Penalties
	7–6

Dongdaemun Stadium
Attendance: 5,500

June 17
19:00 UTC+9

Daewoo Royals	1–1	LG Cheetahs
Yoo Su-sang 80'		Kim Sang-jin 14'
Penalties
	3–1

Busan Gudeok stadium
Attendance: 9,500

July 1
17:00 UTC+9

Yukong Elephants	0–0	Daewoo Royals
Penalties
	4–3

Dongdaemun Stadium
Attendance: 12,000

July 1
19:00 UTC+9

Ilhwa Chunma	1–1	LG Cheetahs
Lee Sang-yoon 88'		Kim Sang-jin 73'
Penalties
	4–3

Dongdaemun Stadium
Attendance: 13,000

July 1
19:00 UTC+9

Hyundai Horang-i	1–0	POSCO Atoms
Chung Jong-soo 60'

Ulsan Sports Complex
Attendance: 18,000

July 15
19:00 UTC+9

LG Cheetahs	1–2	Yukong Elephants
Kim Sang-jin 75' (pen.)		Huh Ki-tae 59'; Noh Soo-jin 67'

Dongdaemun Stadium
Attendance: 4,000

July 15
19:00 UTC+9

Daewoo Royals	3–1	Hyundai Horang-i
Lee Tae-ho 6', 41'; Kim Jung-hyuk 80'		Song Ju-seok 28'

Busan Gudeok stadium
Attendance: 6,300

July 15
19:00 UTC+9

POSCO Atoms	0–0	Ilhwa Chunma
Penalties
	5–3

Steelyard Stadium
Attendance: 12,000

September 2
19:00 UTC+9

Hyundai Horang-i	0–1	Yukong Elephants
		Shin Dong-chul 10'

Ulsan Sports Complex
Attendance: 10,000

September 2
19:00 UTC+9

Daewoo Royals	0–1	Ilhwa Chunma
		Shin Tae-yong 62'

Busan Gudeok stadium
Attendance: 4,000

September 2
19:00 UTC+9

LG Cheetahs	4–1	POSCO Atoms
Hwang Young-woo 12'; Kim Sam-soo 15'; Lee Young-jin 84'; Seo Jung-won 88'		Bogdanović 27'

Dongdaemun Stadium
Attendance: 4,000

September 16
17:00 UTC+9

Yukong Elephants	1–3	POSCO Atoms
Lee Gwang-jong 60'		Lee Yeong-sang 54' (pen.); Baek Gi-hong 78'; Cha Sang-hae 85'

Dongdaemun Stadium
Attendance: 9,300

September 16
19:00 UTC+9

LG Cheetahs	1–0	Daewoo Royals
Luzardo 46' (pen.)

Dongdaemun Stadium
Attendance: 12,000

September 16
19:00 UTC+9

Hyundai Horang-i	1–0	Ilhwa Chunma
Kim Hyun-seok 90+8' (pen.)

Ulsan Sports Complex
Attendance: 10,000

September 30
19:00 UTC+9

Daewoo Royals	1–0	Yukong Elephants
Park Hyeon-yong 38'

Busan Gudeok stadium
Attendance: 1,884

September 30
19:00 UTC+9

POSCO Atoms	2–1	Hyundai Horang-i
Baek Gi-hong 24'; Lee Jae-il 35' (o.g.)		Kim Hyun-seok 44'

Steelyard Stadium
Attendance: 13,895

September 30
19:00 UTC+9

Ilhwa Chunma	2–0	LG Cheetahs
Ko Jeong-woon 19', 84'

Dongdaemun Stadium
Attendance: 5,000

October 7
19:00 UTC+9

Yukong Elephants	1–2	Ilhwa Chunma
Jo Jeong-hyeon 89'		Ko Jeong-woon 20'; Shin Tae-yong 49'

Dongdaemun Stadium
Attendance: 2,532

October 7
19:00 UTC+9

Hyundai Horang-i	1–0	LG Cheetahs
Shin Hong-gi 40'

Ulsan Sports Complex
Attendance: 9,000

October 7
19:00 UTC+9

Daewoo Royals	0–0	POSCO Atoms
Penalties
	3–4

Busan Gudeok stadium
Attendance: 2,000

October 14
15:00 UTC+9

Yukong Elephants	1–4	LG Cheetahs
Hwangbo Kwan 4'		Kim Hong-un 15'; Lee Young-ik 39'; Luzardo 80'; Kim Sang-jin 84'

Dongdaemun Stadium
Attendance: 2,340

October 14
17:00 UTC+9

Ilhwa Chunma	2–2	POSCO Atoms
Kim Lee-ju 63'; Ha Seong-jun 89'		Lee Gi-geun 44'; Lee Won-cheol 90'
Penalties
	3–1

Dongdaemun Stadium
Attendance: 9,300

October 14
19:00 UTC+9

Hyundai Horang-i	1–1	Daewoo Royals
Kim Hyun-seok 72'		Chung Yong-hwan 15'
Penalties
	4–3

Ulsan Sports Complex
Attendance: 1,500

October 28
15:00 UTC+9

Ilhwa Chunma	0–2	Yukong Elephants
		Noh Soo-jin 49', 76' (pen.)

Dongdaemun Stadium
Attendance: 4,000

October 28
17:00 UTC+9

LG Cheetahs	2–1	Hyundai Horang-i
Yoon Sang-chul 48'; Choi Young-jun 85'		Song Ju-seok 86'

Dongdaemun Stadium
Attendance: 4,000

October 28
19:00 UTC+9

POSCO Atoms	4–0	Daewoo Royals
Park Tae-ha 7'; Lee Won-cheol 12', 42'; Choi Moon-sik 78'

Steelyard Stadium
Attendance: 10,000

== Final ==
November 25

LG Cheetahs	2–2	Ilhwa Chunma
Lee Young-ik 15'; Lee Jong-hwa 58' (o.g.)		Lee Sang-yoon 42'; Kim I-ju 78'

Dongdaemun Stadium

November 28

Ilhwa Chunma	2–0	LG Cheetahs
Shin Tae-yong 10'; Lee Tae-hong 31'

Dongdaemun Stadium

== Awards ==
Award	Player	Team	Points
Top goalscorer	(South Korea) Noh Soo-jin	Yukong Elephants	5 goals
Top assist provider	(South Korea) Lee Kee-keun	POSCO Atoms	3 assists

== See also ==
- 1992 K League
