= Kim Sang-jin =

- Hangul: 김상진
- RR: Gim Sangjin
- MR: Kim Sangjin

Kim Sang-jin may refer to:

- Kim Sang-jin (film director)
- Kim Sang-jin (footballer)
- Kim Sang-jin (politician), a member of the 5th Supreme People's Assembly of North Korea
