= Lee Kee-keun =

South Korean footballer (born 1965)

Lee Kee-keun 이기근
Personal information
- Full name: Lee Kee-keun
- Date of birth: August 13, 1965 (age 61)
- Place of birth: South Korea
- Positions: Forward; midfielder

Team information
- Current team: Hoengseong FC

Youth career
- 1983–1986: Hanyang University

Senior career*
Years	Team	Apps	(Gls)
1987–1992	POSCO Atoms	156	(45)
1993–1994	Daewoo Royals	51	(11)
1996–1997	Suwon Samsung Bluewings	57	(14)
Total		264	(70)

International career^{‡}
1982–1983	South Korea U-20		
1983–1986	South Korea U-23		
1991	South Korea	2	(0)
- * Club domestic league appearances and goals as of December 2, 2008 ‡ National team caps and goals as of December 2, 2008

Lee Kee-keun (Korean: 이기근, born on August 13, 1965) is a former South Korea football player. He was member of South Korea U-20 at the 1983 FIFA World Youth Championship and he was top scorer of K-League twice. He is currently manager of Hoengseong FC.

== Honors and awards ==
=== Player ===
POSCO Atoms

- K-League Winners (2) : 1988, 1992

=== Individual ===
- K-League Regular Season Top Scorer Award (2): 1988, 1991
- K-League Cup Top Assistor Award (1): 1992
- K-League Best XI (2) : 1988, 1991
