= Lee Jong-hwa (footballer) =

South Korean footballer

Lee Jong-Hwa 이종화
Personal information
- Full name: Lee Jong-Hwa
- Date of birth: July 20, 1963 (age 63)
- Place of birth: Tongyeong, Gyeongnam, South Korea
- Height: 1.79 m (5 ft 10 1/2 in)
- Position: Defender

Team information
- Current team: Taesung High School

Youth career
- 1983–1987: University of Incheon

Senior career*
Years	Team	Apps	(Gls)
1986–1991	Hyundai Horang-i	55	(6)
1991–1996	Ilhwa Chunma	116	(1)
Total		171	(7)

International career^{‡}
1994	South Korea	2	(0)

Managerial career
- 1997–1998: Joongdong High School
- 2000–: Taesung High School
- * Club domestic league appearances and goals as of 12 June 2009 ‡ National team caps and goals as of 12 June 2009

Lee Jong-Hwa (Korean: 이종화, born July 20, 1963) is a former South Korean football player and coach.

== Playing career ==
He played in K-League side Hyundai Horang-i and Cheonan Ilhwa Chunma in South Korea.

Lee's pro debut was against Hanil Bank FC on March 8, 1986, for Hyundai Horang-i. In his first season, he played three games. He announced his retirement when the 1986 season ended. After he retired from football, he ran a bakery, but he was recalled by Kim Ho the new manager of Hyundai Horang-i in 1988. From 1989, he played again in the K-League for Hyundai Horang-i. In 1991, he moved to Ilhwa Chunma. Lee won the K-League winner title for the third consecutive time with Ilhwa Chunma.

== International career ==
He was a participant at 1994 FIFA World Cup as a member of South Korea, but never played in a tournament.

== Club career statistics ==
Club performance			League		Cup		League Cup		Continental		Total	
Season	Club	League	Apps	Goals	Apps	Goals	Apps	Goals	Apps	Goals	Apps	Goals
South Korea			League		KFA Cup		League Cup		Asia		Total	
1986	Hyundai Horang-i	K-League	3	0	-		3	1	-		6	1
1987	Hyundai Horang-i	K-League	0	0	-		-		-		0	0
1988	Hyundai Horang-i	K-League	0	0	-		-		-		0	0
1989	Hyundai Horang-i	K-League	35	4	-		-		-		35	4
1990	Hyundai Horang-i	K-League	16	2	-		-		-		16	2
1991	Hyundai Horang-i	K-League	1	0	-		-		-		1	0
1991	Ilhwa Chunma	K-League	15	1	-		-		-		15	1
1992	Ilhwa Chunma	K-League	26	0	-		5	0	-		31	0
1993	Ilhwa Chunma	K-League	27	0	-		5	0	-		32	0
1994	Ilhwa Chunma	K-League	21	0	-		0	0	?	?		
1995	Ilhwa Chunma	K-League	18	0	-		7	1	?	?		
1996	Ilhwa Chunma	K-League	9	0	?	?	0	0	?	?		
Total	South Korea		171	7			20	2				
Career total			171	7			20	2				

== Honours ==
=== Hyundai Horangi ===
- Korea Professional Championship (1): 1986

=== Ilhwa Chunma ===
- K-League
  - Winner (3): 1993, 1994, 1995
  - Runner-up (1): 1992
- K-League Cup (Adidas Cup)
  - Winner (1): 1992
  - Runner-up (1): 1995
- AFC Champions League (1): 1995-96
- Asian Super Cup (1) : 1996

=== Individual ===
- K-League Best XI (2) : 1992, 1993
