= Goran Jevtić =

Goran Jevtić may refer to:

- Goran Jevtić (actor), Serbian actor
- Goran Jevtić (footballer), Serbian footballer
