= Professional Football Championship =

Professional Football Championship may refer to:

- Professional American football championship games
- Professional Football Championship (South Korea)
