= Marcão (footballer, born 1994) =

Brazilian footballer

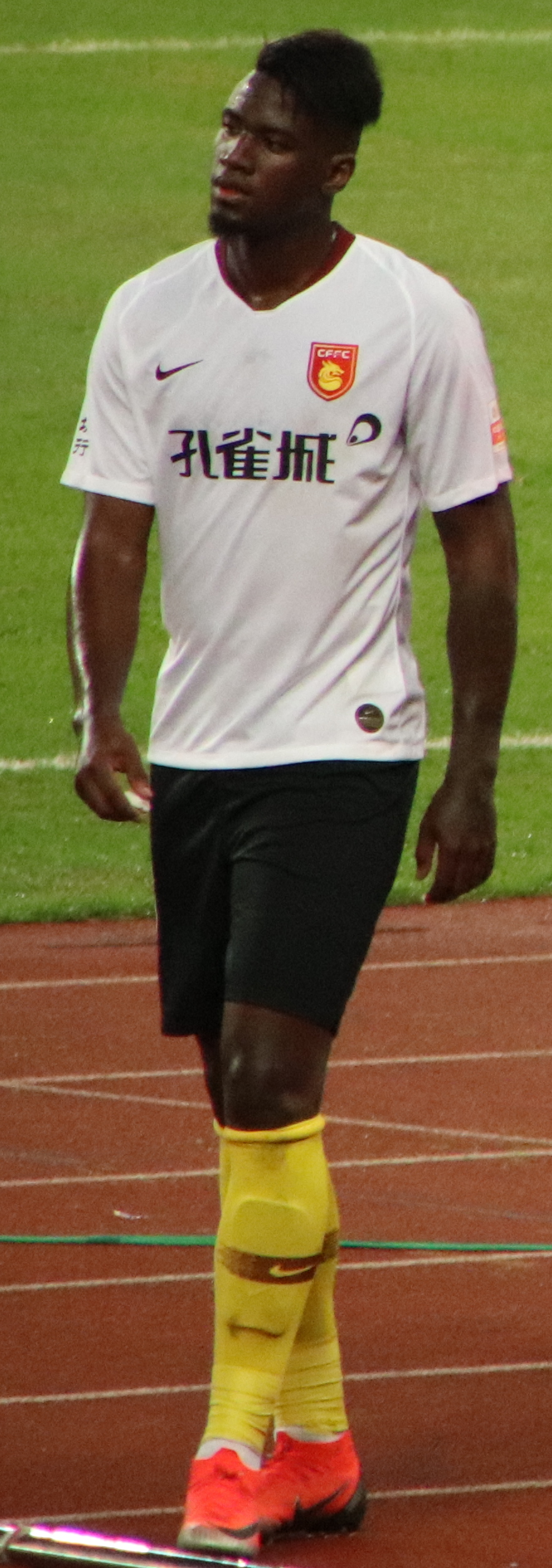
- Marcão playing for Hebei China Fortune in 2019

Personal information
- Full name: Marcos Vinicius Amaral Alves
- Date of birth: 17 June 1994 (age 32)
- Place of birth: Tietê, Brazil
- Height: 1.96 m (6 ft 5 in)
- Position: Forward

Team information
- Current team: Ulsan HD
- Number: 9

Youth career
- 2006: São Paulo
- 2011–2012: Ituano

Senior career*
Years	Team	Apps	(Gls)
2013–2017	Ituano	42	(10)
2015	→ Guarani de Palhoça (loan)	7	(0)
2016	→ Bragantino (loan)	2	(0)
2017	→ Gyeongnam FC (loan)	12	(7)
2017–2018	Gyeongnam FC	51	(41)
2019–2021	Hebei China Fortune	46	(23)
2021–2022	Wuhan Three Towns	45	(38)
2023–2025	Al-Ahli	11	(1)
2023	→ Wuhan Three Towns (loan)	7	(3)
2024	→ Fatih Karagümrük (loan)	11	(6)
2024–2025	→ Kocaelispor (loan)	25	(8)
2025–	Ulsan HD	20	(8)
- * Club domestic league appearances and goals as of 3 August 2026

Marcos Vinicius Amaral Alves (born 17 June 1994), known as Marcão, is a Brazilian professional footballer who plays as a forward for K League 1 club Ulsan HD.

== Early life ==
Born in Tietê, São Paulo, he joined the academy of São Paulo FC at the age of 12. However, Marcão was not interested in football, switching to basketball after six months. At the age of 17, he participated in a football match due to his friend's request, and actually, the match was a tryout for Ituano FC. He accidentally restarted his football career after receiving Ituano's offer.

== Playing career ==
=== Gyeongnam FC ===
On 20 December 2016, Marcão joined K League 2 club Gyeongnam FC on a one-year loan. He had seven goals and two assists in the first 12 K League 2 matches, and Gyeongnam went on an unbeaten run at the same time. After watching this great presence, Gyeongnam suggested a three-year contract to him early. During the 2017 season, he helped the club gain a league title and promotion to the K League 1 by scoring 22 goals in 32 matches. He was named the league's Most Valuable Player and top goalscorer at the end of the season.

On 4 March 2018, Marcão scored his first hat-trick in a K League 1 match against Sangju Sangmu, where he made his K League 1 debut. Despite being a newly-promoted club, Gyeongnam finished second at the 2018 K League 1 under his influence. He once again became both the MVP and the top goalscorer after scoring 26 goals in 31 K League 1 appearances.

=== Hebei China Fortune ===
On 21 February 2019, Marcão transferred to Chinese Super League side Hebei China Fortune. He showed anxious start due to an aftereffect of his injury, but contributed to Hebei's escape from the relegation zone. During the 2019 season, he scored 11 goals in 26 CSL matches, becoming the club's top goalscorer.

At the 2020 Chinese Super League, Marcão led Hebei to the knockout stage by scoring the most goals among CSL players with 11 goals during 14 matches in the regular season, but scored no goals in the knockout stage.

Prior to the 2021 season, Kim Jong-boo, Marcão's mentor at Gyeongnam, was appointed as the new manager of Hebei, met with Marcão again. They were expected to create a synergy, but played together in only three matches before Hebei decided to sell Marcão due to financial difficulty.

=== Wuhan Three Towns ===
On 19 July 2021, Marcão joined China League One club Wuhan Three Towns. He directly proved his worth for the second half of the season, bringing a league title as well as a qualification for the CSL by forming a strong offense alongside Moses Ogbu. The next year, he led newly-promoted Wuhan Three Towns to the CSL title while becoming the league's top goalscorer with 27 goals in 26 matches.

=== Al-Ahli ===
In January 2023, Marcão transferred to Saudi First Division League club Al-Ahli.

==== Loan spells ====
Al-Ahli succeeded in promoting to the Saudi Pro League after winning the First Division, but Marcão played as a starter in only one match for half a year. After the club recruited Brazil international Roberto Firmino, he returned to Wuhan Three Towns on a loan deal.

On 9 February 2024, Marcão joined Süper Lig club Fatih Karagümrük on loan until the end of the season.

On 30 July 2024, Marcão moved to TFF 1. Lig club Kocaelispor on a one-year loan. At Kocaelispor, he once again won the second-tier league, promoting his club to the first-tier league. He experienced promotion in four countries where he played, namely South Korea, China, Saudi Arabia, and Turkey.

=== Ulsan HD ===
On 18 July 2025, Marcão joined K League 1 club Ulsan HD, returning to South Korea for the first time in seven years.

== Career statistics ==
As of 9 December 2025

Appearances and goals by club, season and competition
Club	Season	League			State league		National cup (Note: Includes Copa do Brasil, Korean FA Cup, Chinese FA Cup)		Continental		Other		Total	
Club	Season	Division	Apps	Goals	Apps	Goals	Apps	Goals	Apps	Goals	Apps	Goals	Apps	Goals
Ituano	2013	—			11 (Note: Appearances in Campeonato Paulista)	3	—		—		19 (Note: Appearances in Copa Paulista)	7	30	10
Ituano	2014	Série D	7	1	5	0	—		—		—		12	1
Ituano	2015	—			—		1	0	—		15	8	16	8
Ituano	2016	Série D	9	5	10	1	—		—		—		19	6
Ituano	Total		16	6	26	4	1	0	—		34	15	77	25
Guarani de Palhoça (loan)	2015	—			7 (Note: Appearances in Campeonato Catarinense)	0	—		—		—		7	0
Bragantino (loan)	2016	Série B	2	0	—		—		—		—		2	0
Gyeongnam FC (loan)	2017	K League 2	12	7	—		0	0	—		—		12	7
Gyeongnam FC	2017	K League 2	20	15	—		1	1	—		—		21	16
Gyeongnam FC	2018	K League 1	31	26	—		0	0	—		—		31	26
Gyeongnam FC	Total		51	41	—		1	1	—		—		52	42
Hebei China Fortune	2019	Chinese Super League	26	11	—		1	0	—		—		27	11
Hebei China Fortune	2020	Chinese Super League	17	11	—		0	0	—		—		17	11
Hebei China Fortune	2021	Chinese Super League	3	1	—		0	0	—		—		3	1
Hebei China Fortune	Total		46	23	—		1	0	—		—		47	23
Wuhan Three Towns	2021	China League One	19	11	—		1	1	—		—		20	12
Wuhan Three Towns	2022	Chinese Super League	26	27	—		0	0	—		—		26	27
Wuhan Three Towns	Total		45	38	—		1	1	—		—		46	39
Al-Ahli	2022–23	Saudi First Division	11	1	—		0	0	—		—		11	1
Wuhan Three Towns (loan)	2023	Chinese Super League	7	3	—		0	0	2 (Note: Appearances in AFC Champions League Elite)	1	—		9	4
Fatih Karagümrük (loan)	2023–24	Süper Lig	11	6	—		3	1	—		—		14	7
Kocaelispor (loan)	2024–25	TFF 1. Lig	25	8	—		2	1	—		—		27	9
Ulsan HD	2025	K League 1	9	3	—		0	0	5	0	—		14	3
Career total			235	136	33	4	9	4	7	1	34	15	318	160

== Honours ==
Ituano

- Campeonato Paulista: 2014
- Copa Paulista runner-up: 2015

Gyeongnam FC

- K League 2: 2017

Wuhan Three Towns

- Chinese Super League: 2022
- China League One: 2021

Al-Ahli

- Saudi First Division League: 2022–23

Kocaelispor

- TFF 1. Lig: 2024–25

Individual

- K League 2 Most Valuable Player: 2017
- K League 2 top goalscorer: 2017
- K League 2 Best XI: 2017
- K League 1 Most Valuable Player: 2018
- K League 1 top goalscorer: 2018
- K League 1 Best XI: 2018
- Chinese Super League top goalscorer: 2022
