= Kim Bo-kyung =

South Korean footballer (born 1989)

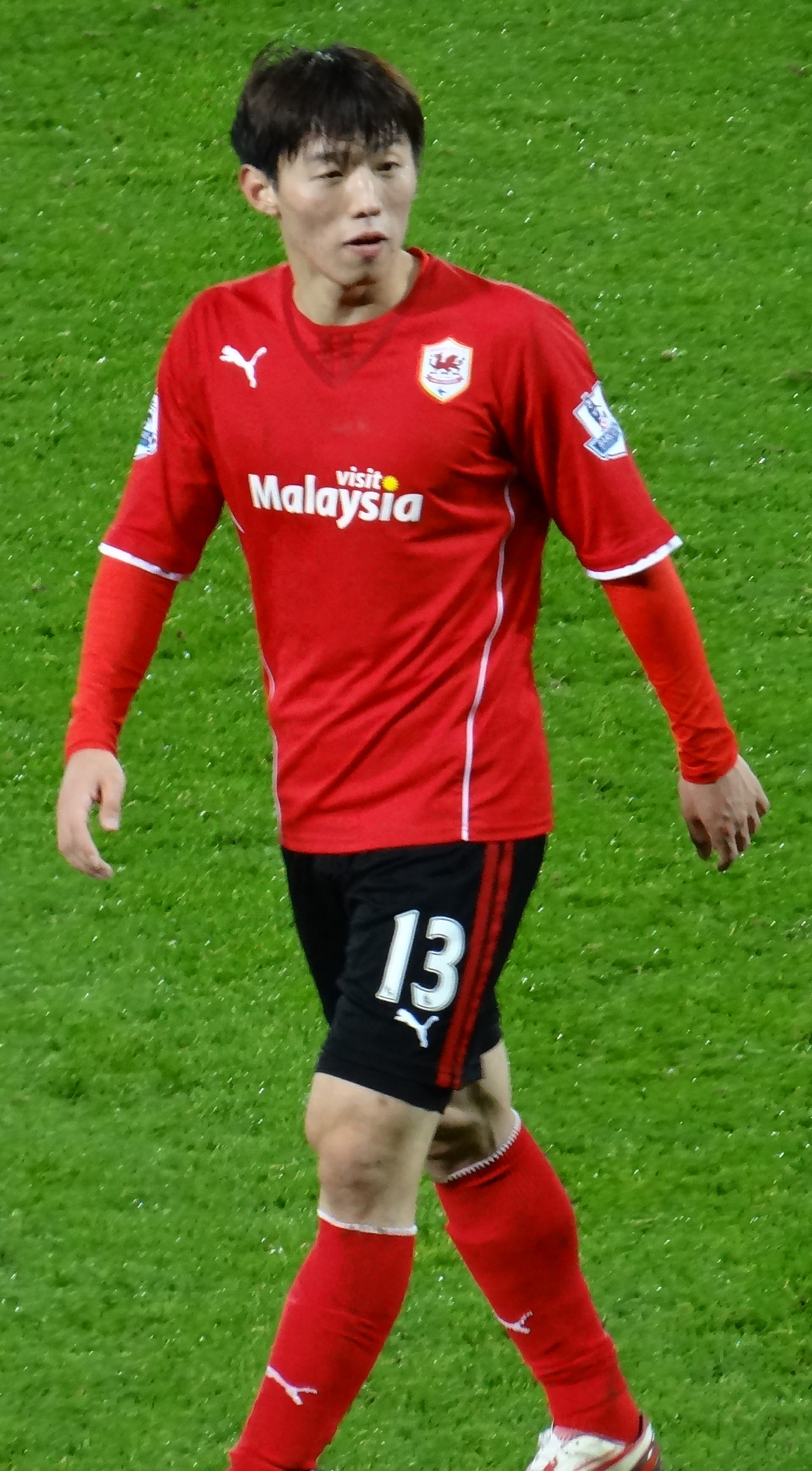
- Kim playing for Cardiff City in 2013

Personal information
- Full name: Kim Bo-kyung
- Date of birth: 6 October 1989 (age 37)
- Place of birth: Gurye, Jeonnam, South Korea
- Height: 1.77 m (5 ft 10 in)
- Positions: Attacking midfielder; winger

Team information
- Current team: FC Anyang
- Number: 24

Youth career
- 2008–2009: Hongik University

Senior career*
Years	Team	Apps	(Gls)
2010–2012	Cerezo Osaka	41	(15)
2010	→ Oita Trinita (loan)	27	(8)
2012–2015	Cardiff City	58	(3)
2015	Wigan Athletic	18	(2)
2015	Matsumoto Yamaga	6	(0)
2016–2017	Jeonbuk Hyundai Motors	44	(7)
2017–2019	Kashiwa Reysol	36	(2)
2019	→ Ulsan Hyundai (loan)	35	(13)
2020–2022	Jeonbuk Hyundai Motors	82	(10)
2023–2024	Suwon Samsung Bluewings	37	(1)
2025–	FC Anyang	26	(2)

International career^{‡}
2007–2009	South Korea U20	21	(6)
2009–2012	South Korea U23	22	(6)
2009	South Korea Universiade	6	(3)
2010–2019	South Korea	38	(4)
Medal record
Men's football
Representing South Korea
Olympic Games
Bronze medal – third place	2012 London
AFC Asian Cup
Bronze medal – third place	2011 Qatar
Asian Games
Bronze medal – third place	2010 Guangzhou
EAFF Championship
Winner	2019 South Korea
Runner-up	2010 Japan
- * Club domestic league appearances and goals as of 3 August 2026 ‡ National team caps and goals as of 11 December 2019

- Kim Bo-kyung
- Hangul: 김보경
- Hanja: 金甫炅
- RR: Gim Bogyeong
- MR: Kim Pogyŏng

Kim Bo-kyung (Korean: 김보경; Korean pronunciation: [kim.bo.ɡjʌŋ] or [kim] [po.ɡjʌŋ]; born 6 October 1989) is a South Korean professional footballer who plays as a midfielder for K League 1 club FC Anyang.

== Club career ==
=== Cerezo Osaka ===
In 2010, Kim dropped out of Hongik University and signed a three-year contract for J1 League side Cerezo Osaka. After he was loaned out to J2 League side Oita Trinita for the 2010 season, he returned to Cerezo Osaka.

During the 2011 season, Kim had 8 goals and 7 assists in 26 J1 League matches. Cerezo manager Levir Culpi was replaced by Sérgio Soares in 2012, but he remained as a key player of the team. Before participating at the 2012 Summer Olympics, he was the fourth-leading goalscorer at the 2012 J1 League with 7 goals in 15 matches.

=== Cardiff City ===
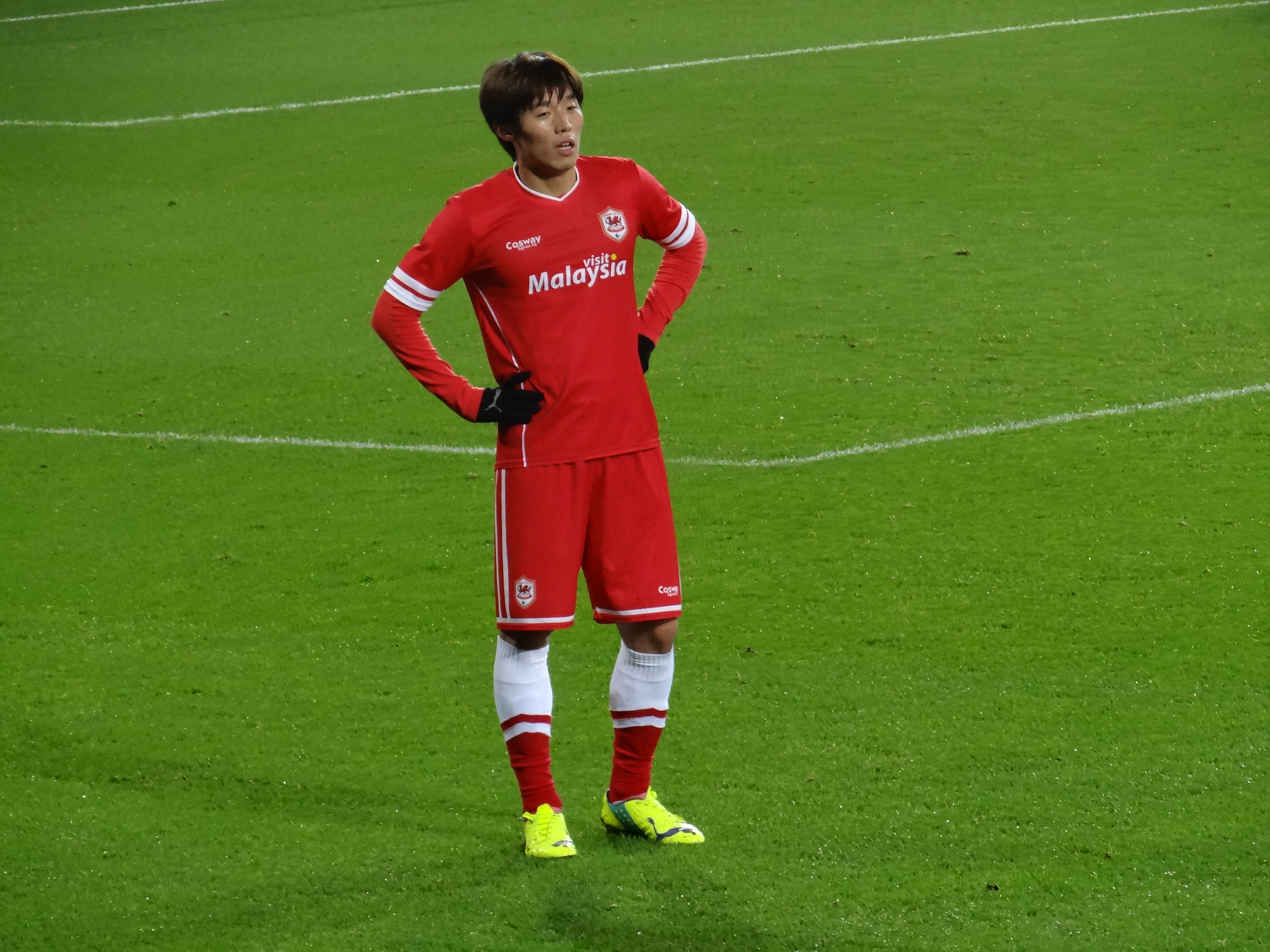
Kim playing for Cardiff City in 2014

On 10 July 2012, his agents confirmed that his club Cerezo Osaka, had entered talks with Cardiff City, a Welsh club of the EFL Championship, over his transfer. On 12 July, Cardiff City and Cerezo Osaka agreed a fee believed to be around £2.5 million. On 27 July, Kim signed a three-year deal with Cardiff City. On 18 September, he made his Cardiff debut in a 2–0 win over Millwall coming on for Craig Noone. On 27 October, his first start for Cardiff came in a 4–0 win over Burnley at Cardiff City Stadium. On 7 December, he scored his first goal for Cardiff in a 4–1 win over Blackburn Rovers. On 19 January 2013, he scored his second goal in a 2–1 win over Blackpool.

On 17 April 2013, Cardiff City were promoted to the Premier League by winning a Championship title, and so Kim became South Korea's 12th Premier League player. On August 26, he showed impressive dribble and cross which were followed by Cardiff's first goal in a 3–2 win over Manchester City. On 24 November, he scored his first Premier League goal against Manchester United with an injury-time header, bringing a 2–2 home draw.

However, Kim failed to prevent Cardiff's relegation. In the first half of the 2014–15 season, he remained at the club, but lost his place. On 24 January 2015, Cardiff City announced Kim's contract had been terminated by mutual consent.

=== Wigan Athletic ===
On 6 February 2015, another Championship club Wigan Athletic announced that Kim agreed a contract until the end of 2014–15 season. Manager Malky Mackay, who used Kim as a main player at Cardiff, once again recruited Kim after moving to Wigan. He secured a position at Wigan, but experienced relegation for the second year in a row. After his contract expired, local rivals Blackburn Rovers tried to sign him, but Kim failed to get a work permit.

=== Jeonbuk Hyundai Motors ===
Kim played for J1 League club Matsumoto Yamaga for three months after failing a tryout for Eredivisie club PSV Eindhoven. On 3 January 2016, he joined K League 1 club Jeonbuk Hyundai Motors, starting to play in his country for the first time. He helped Jeonbuk win the 2016 AFC Champions League, qualifying for the 2016 FIFA Club World Cup. During the Club World Cup, he scored once in a 2–1 defeat to América and once in a 4–1 win over Mamelodi Sundowns.

=== Kashiwa Reysol ===
On 22 June 2017, Kim moved to J1 League club Kashiwa Reysol, meeting his national teammate Yun Suk-young. He once again suffered relegation while playing for Kashiwa for one and a half years. He experienced relegation at four foreign clubs Cardiff, Wigan, Yamaga and Kashiwa, being nicknamed the "Missionary of relegation" by Korean fans.

==== Loan to Ulsan Hyundai ====
During the 2019 season, Kim was loaned to K League 1 club Ulsan Hyundai, returning to South Korea. Kim showed great influence at Ulsan, leading them to the first place in the league standings ahead of the last match. However, he and his team suffered a shocking 4–1 defeat to Pohang Steelers in the last match, and conceded the league title to Jeonbuk Hyundai Motors by the number of goals with the two clubs' points being tied. Afterwards, he received the K League Most Valuable Player Award, and came back to champions Jeonbuk.

=== Return to Jeonbuk ===
On 5 January 2020, Kim rejoined Jeonbuk Hyundai Motors after being promised the highest salary among native Korean players at the K League 1. He won two league titles and one Korean FA Cup title for three years. Especially in the 2021 season, he won the K League Top Assist Provider Award after providing 10 assists during 32 league appearances.

== International career ==
Under Hong Myung-bo, who managed South Korea at the 2009 FIFA U-20 World Cup and the 2012 Summer Olympics, Kim participated at both tournaments, and won a bronze medal at the latter.

On 9 January 2010, Kim made his first international appearance for South Korea in a 4–2 friendly defeat to Zambia. He was called up for the 2010 FIFA World Cup, but did not appear at the competition. After Hong Myung-bo became the manager of the senior national team, he played as a substitute in two group stage matches of the 2014 FIFA World Cup.

== Career statistics ==
=== Club ===
As of match played 22 November 2025

Appearances and goals by club, season and competition
Club	Season	League			National cup		League cup		Continental		Other		Total	
Club	Season	Division	Apps	Goals	Apps	Goals	Apps	Goals	Apps	Goals	Apps	Goals	Apps	Goals
Oita Trinita (loan)	2010	J2 League	27	8	0	0	0	0	—		—		27	8
Cerezo Osaka	2011	J1 League	26	8	3	1	0	0	8 (Note: Appearances in AFC Champions League)	1	—		37	10
Cerezo Osaka	2012	J1 League	15	7	0	0	3	2	—		—		18	9
Cerezo Osaka	Total		41	15	3	1	3	2	8	1	—		55	19
Cardiff City	2012–13	Championship	28	2	0	0	0	0	—		—		28	2
Cardiff City	2013–14	Premier League	28	1	3	0	0	0	—		—		31	1
Cardiff City	2014–15	Championship	2	0	0	0	3	0	—		—		5	0
Cardiff City	Total		58	3	3	0	3	0	—		—		64	3
Wigan Athletic	2014–15	Championship	18	2	0	0	0	0	—		—		18	2
Matsumoto Yamaga	2015	J1 League	6	0	0	0	0	0	—		—		6	0
Jeonbuk Hyundai Motors	2016	K League 1	29	4	1	0	—		11	1	2 (Note: Appearances in FIFA Club World Cup)	2	43	7
Jeonbuk Hyundai Motors	2017	K League 1	15	3	1	0	—		—		—		16	3
Jeonbuk Hyundai Motors	Total		44	7	2	0	—		11	1	2	2	59	10
Kashiwa Reysol	2017	J1 League	13	0	2	0	—		—		—		15	0
Kashiwa Reysol	2018	J1 League	23	2	2	0	2	0	5	0	—		32	2
Kashiwa Reysol	Total		36	2	4	0	2	0	5	0	—		47	2
Ulsan Hyundai (loan)	2019	K League 1	35	13	0	0	—		8	0	—		43	13
Jeonbuk Hyundai Motors	2020	K League 1	25	5	4	0	—		6	0	—		35	5
Jeonbuk Hyundai Motors	2021	K League 1	32	3	0	0	—		7	0	—		39	3
Jeonbuk Hyundai Motors	2022	K League 1	25	2	4	0	—		9	1	—		38	3
Jeonbuk Hyundai Motors	Total		82	10	8	0	—		22	1	—		112	11
Suwon Samsung Bluewings	2023	K League 1	23	0	1	0	—		—		—		24	0
Suwon Samsung Bluewings	2024	K League 2	14	1	2	0	—		—		—		16	1
Suwon Samsung Bluewings	Total		37	1	3	0	—		—		—		40	1
FC Anyang	2025	K League 1	19	2	2	0	—		—		—		21	2
Career total			403	63	25	1	8	2	54	3	2	2	492	71

=== International ===
Scores and results list South Korea's goal tally first.

List of international goals scored by Kim Bo-kyung
No.	Date	Venue	Opponent	Score	Result	Competition
1	12 June 2012	Goyang Sports Complex, Goyang, South Korea	Lebanon	1–0	3–0	2014 FIFA World Cup qualification
2	12 June 2012	Goyang Sports Complex, Goyang, South Korea	Lebanon	2–0	3–0	2014 FIFA World Cup qualification
3	15 October 2013	Cheonan Baekseok Stadium, Cheonan, South Korea	Mali	3–1	3–1	Friendly
4	11 November 2016	Cheonan Baekseok Stadium, Cheonan, South Korea	Canada	1–0	2–0	Friendly

== Honours ==
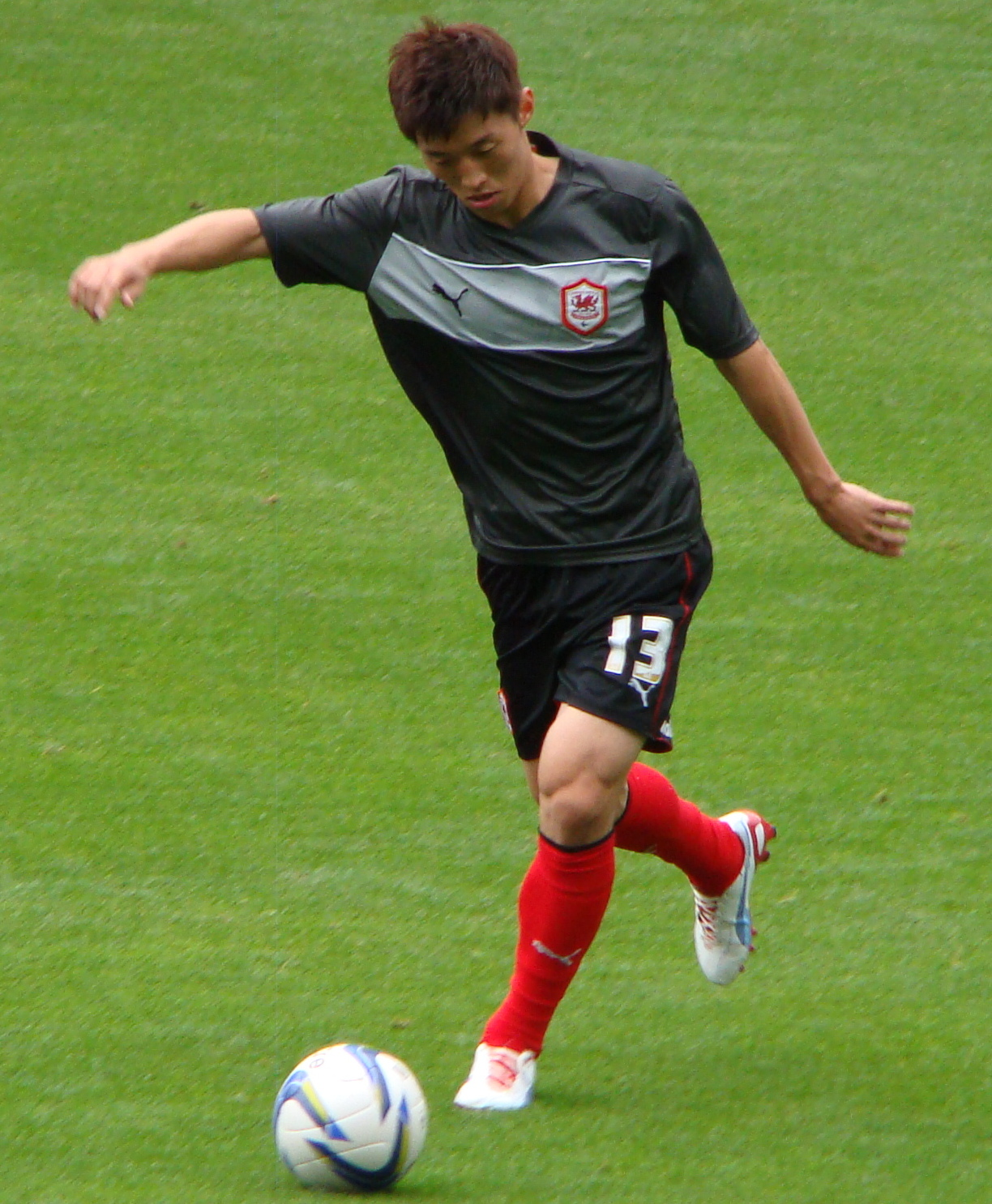
Kim playing for Cardiff City in 2012

Cardiff City

- Football League Championship: 2012–13

Jeonbuk Hyundai Motors

- K League 1: 2020, 2021
- Korean FA Cup: 2020
- AFC Champions League: 2016

South Korea U23

- Summer Olympics bronze medal: 2012
- Asian Games bronze medal: 2010

South Korea

- EAFF Championship: 2019
- AFC Asian Cup third place: 2011

Individual

- K League All-Star: 2019
- K League 1 Most Valuable Player: 2019
- K League 1 Best XI: 2019
- K League 1 top assist provider: 2021
