= Cha Sang-hae =

South Korean footballer (born 1965)

Cha Sang-Hae 차상해
Personal information
- Full name: Cha Sang-Hae
- Date of birth: October 20, 1965 (age 61)
- Place of birth: South Korea
- Position: Forward

Team information
- Current team: Icheon Jeil High School

Youth career
- 1981–1983: Jungdong High School

Senior career*
Years	Team	Apps	(Gls)
1989	Lucky-Goldstar Hwangso	22	(6)
1991–1992	Daewoo Royals	8	(0)
1992–1994	Pohang Atoms	40	(8)
1995	Yukong Elephants	12	(1)
1995	Daewoo Royals	6	(1)
1996	Anyang LG Cheetahs	3	(0)
1996	Bucheon Yukong	1	(0)

International career^{‡}
1993	South Korea		

Managerial career
- ?–: Icheon Jeil High School
- * Club domestic league appearances and goals as of December 2, 2008 ‡ National team caps and goals as of December 2, 2008

Cha Sang-Hae (Korean: 차상해, Korean pronunciation: [tɕʰa.saŋ.ɦɛ̝]; born on August 13, 1965) is a former South Korea football player. He was the K League Classic's top scorer in 1993.

== Honors and awards ==
=== Player ===
POSCO Atoms

- K-League Winners (1) : 1992

=== Individual ===
- K-League Regular Season Top Scorer Award (1): 1993
- K-League Best XI (1) : 1993
