= Koo Ja-cheol =

South Korean footballer (born 1989)

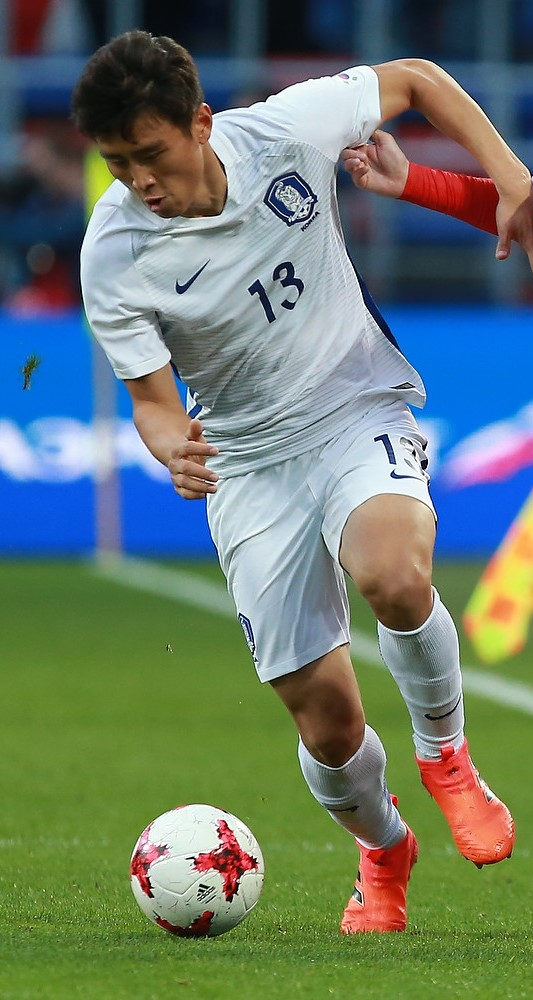
- Koo with South Korea in 2017

Personal information
- Full name: Koo Ja-cheol
- Date of birth: 27 February 1989 (age 37)
- Place of birth: Nonsan, Chungnam, South Korea
- Height: 1.82 m (6 ft 0 in)
- Position: Midfielder

Youth career
- 2004–2006: Boin High School

Senior career*
Years	Team	Apps	(Gls)
2007–2010	Jeju United	67	(7)
2011–2014	VfL Wolfsburg	32	(0)
2012–2013	→ FC Augsburg (loan)	36	(8)
2014–2015	Mainz 05	39	(6)
2015–2019	FC Augsburg	104	(14)
2019–2021	Al-Gharafa	38	(6)
2021	Al-Khor	8	(0)
2022–2024	Jeju United	28	(1)
Total		352	(42)

International career
2007–2009	South Korea U20	16	(5)
2009–2012	South Korea U23	16	(5)
2008–2019	South Korea	76	(19)
Medal record
Men's football
Representing South Korea
Olympic Games
Bronze medal – third place	2012 London
AFC Asian Cup
Runner-up	2015 Australia
Bronze medal – third place	2011 Qatar
Asian Games
Bronze medal – third place	2010 Guangzhou
EAFF Championship
Winner	2008 China
Runner-up	2010 Japan
- * Club domestic league appearances and goals as of 24 November 2024 (UTC)

- Koo Ja-cheol
- Hangul: 구자철
- Hanja: 具滋哲
- RR: Gu Jacheol
- MR: Ku Chach'ŏl
- Also spelled Gu Ja-chul or Ku Ja-chul

Koo Ja-cheol (Korean: 구자철; Korean pronunciation: [ku.dʑa.tɕʰʌl] or [ku] [tɕa.tɕʰʌl]; born 27 February 1989) is a South Korean former professional footballer who played as a midfielder. Koo is considered one of the most successful South Korean players at the Bundesliga. He made 211 Bundesliga appearances, while playing for VfL Wolfsburg, FC Augsburg and Mainz 05. On the international side, he won a bronze medal at the 2012 Summer Olympics, and captained the South Korea national team at the 2014 FIFA World Cup.

== Early life ==
Koo started football at age ten when a nearby elementary school opened its football club. During his early youth career, he mostly played as a defender, often taking the role of sweeper. While playing for Boin High School, he suffered from anemia, but contributed to the school's runner-up finish at the 2016 edition of the Baekrok High School Football Tournament, annually held in Jeju Island. At the competition, he grabbed the attention of Jung Hae-seong, then manager of Jeju United.

== Club career ==
=== Jeju United ===
In 2007, Koo was selected by Jeju United in the K League draft. He failed to make an impression in his first two years at Jeju due to numerous injuries. However, he slowly broke into the first team as a defensive midfielder.

In January 2010, Koo was reportedly invited by Blackburn Rovers for a trial, but the move did not happen. That year, he spent a great season at Jeju instead, driving his club to an unprecedented runner-up finish. After the contribution, he received some individual awards from the league's federation, namely the Top Assist Provider Award and the FANtastic Player Award, as well as being selected for the Best XI.

=== VfL Wolfsburg ===
On 30 January 2011, Koo moved to Bundesliga club VfL Wolfsburg, signing a three-and-a-half-year contract for an undisclosed fee. On 12 February 2011, Koo made his Wolfsburg debut, coming on as a 64th-minute substitute in a 1–0 home defeat to Hamburger SV. However, he had difficulty competing for a starting position with his teammates during a year.

==== Loan to FC Augsburg ====
On 31 January 2012, he moved on loan to another Bundesliga club FC Augsburg. On 18 February, he scored the equaliser outside the penalty area in a 4–1 defeat to Bayer Leverkusen. On 17 March, Augsburg defeated Mainz 05 2–1 after he equalised with a lob outside the penalty area. On 24 March, he provided an assist for the equaliser in a 1–1 draw with Werder Bremen. On 31 March, he scored the opening goal with a low shot from outside the penalty area, contributing to a 2–1 win over 1. FC Köln. On 7 April, he scored the equaliser through Manuel Neuer's five-hole in a 2–1 defeat to Bayern Munich. On 5 May, he scored the winning goal with a header in a 1–0 win over Hamburger SV. He became Augsburg's top goalscorer with five goals in 15 appearances despite playing for them for only half a season. He performed a significant part in helping Augsburg avoid relegation in their maiden Bundesliga season.

In a DFB-Pokal match on 18 December, Koo was involved in an altercation with Bayern Munich's midfielder Franck Ribéry. After a disputed free kick, Koo confronted Ribéry and touched his face. Ribéry slapped Koo in response, and was sent off by referee Thorsten Kinhöfer. Bayern Munich director Karl-Heinz Rummenigge demanded that the ejection be overturned, while Bayern manager Jupp Heynckes blamed both Koo and Ribéry, stating that although Koo had provoked Ribéry the latter should learn to not react under pressure.

In his second season at Augsburg, Koo was plagued by injuries, but still helped his club survive relegation in the limited matches he played in.

=== Mainz 05 ===
In the first half of the 2013–14 season, Koo returned to Wolfsburg, playing as a central midfielder or winger. However, he wanted more appearances, and preferred playing as an attacking midfielder like when he played for Augsburg. On 18 January 2014, it was announced that he penned a four-and-a-half-year deal with Mainz 05.

On 31 July 2014, Koo contributed to a 1–0 first-leg win by providing an assist in the third qualifying round of the 2014–15 UEFA Europa League against Asteras Tripolis. In the second leg on 7 August, he scored his first Europa League goal, but Mainz 05 were eliminated from the tournament after losing 3–1 to Asteras. During the 2014–15 season, he was used as a winger again to replace Eric Maxim Choupo-Moting and Nicolai Müller, who left the club, having five goals and two assists in 23 league appearances.

=== Return to FC Augsburg ===
On 31 August 2015, Koo rejoined Augsburg, and so Augsburg spent a season with three South Korean players, including Ji Dong-won and Hong Jeong-ho. On 12 September, he provided an assist for the opening goal with a backheel in a 2–1 defeat to Bayern Munich. On 23 September, he won a penalty against Granit Xhaka, but it was insufficient to reverse the club's defeat to Borussia Mönchengladbach. On 21 February 2016, he scored a solo goal after starting to sprint behind the half-way line in a 1–0 win over Hannover 96. On 6 March, he became the first-ever player to score a Bundesliga hat-trick for Augsburg, giving them a 3–0 lead in a match against Bayer Leverkusen, which ended in a shocking 3–3 draw. He had eight goals and four assists during 29 appearances at the 2015–16 Bundesliga. He also participated at the 2015–16 UEFA Europa League, the first UEFA competition in Augsburg's history. They earned three wins and three losses in the group stage, succeeding in advancing to the knockout stage. Afterwards, they lost 1–0 on aggregate to Liverpool in the round of 32. At the end of the 2015–16 season, he was evaluated as the league's fifth best attacking midfielder by magazine kicker.

On 3 February 2019, he achieved his 200th Bundesliga appearance against Mainz 05. He left Augsburg by turning down a contract extension with the club after the 2018–19 season. He wanted to contract with a higher-ranked club, but finally joined Qatar Stars League side Al-Gharafa in August 2019.

== International career ==
Koo made his senior international debut on 17 February 2008, coming on as a substitute in South Korea's 3–2 victory over China at the 2008 EAFF Championship. The following year, he captained South Korea to the quarter-finals of the 2009 FIFA U-20 World Cup, scoring from the penalty spot in a 3–0 group-stage victory over the United States.

Koo attended South Korea's final training camp before the 2010 FIFA World Cup, but one of the last three players to be cut. Later that year, Koo captained the under-23 team to bronze at the Asian Games, scoring three goals, including one in a 4–3 comeback victory over Iran in the bronze-medal match.

At the 2011 AFC Asian Cup, coach Cho Kwang-rae moved Koo from a deeper midfield position into a withdrawn-forward role behind Ji Dong-won after Park Chu-young withdrew through injury, a change dubbed the "Koo shift" by the Korean press. He played all six matches and scored four times in the group stage. After having South Korea's first attempt saved in the semi-final penalty shoot-out defeat by Japan, he scored and assisted Ji in a 3–2 victory over Uzbekistan in the third-place match. His five goals earned him the tournament's Golden Boot as South Korea finished third.

Koo again served as captain at the 2012 Olympic tournament, appearing in all six matches. In the bronze-medal match against Japan, he was booked for a strong tackle from behind on Yūki Ōtsu and repeatedly demanded "Why? Why? Why?" of the referee. Koo later linked his emotions during the match to South Korea's 0–3 senior defeat by Japan the previous year. He scored the second goal in South Korea's 2–0 victory, securing the country's first Olympic medal in football.

Hong Myung-bo named Koo captain for the 2014 FIFA World Cup. Aged 25, he became the youngest player to captain South Korea at a World Cup and started all three group matches, scoring in a 2–4 defeat by Algeria as the team finished with one point. Koo later said that he had focused too much on managing the team away from the pitch rather than leading through his own performances. At his retirement press conference in 2025, he called the tournament his greatest career disappointment and said that he had been too young to understand the social responsibility that came with representing the country.

At the 2015 AFC Asian Cup, Koo was named Player of the Match in a 1–0 opening victory over Oman. His saved shot created the rebound from which Cho Young-cheol scored the winning goal. After missing the Kuwait match with a fever, he returned against hosts Australia but tore a ligament in his right elbow following an aerial challenge, ruling him out as South Korea went on to finish as runners-up.

During qualification for the 2018 FIFA World Cup, Koo scored an 85th-minute winner in a 2–1 comeback victory over Uzbekistan in November 2016, moving South Korea into the group's second automatic qualification position. At the finals, he started against Sweden and Germany. Against Germany, he partnered Son Heung-min in attack and performed a pressing role, but was substituted in the 56th minute after his injured knee swelled, before South Korea scored twice in stoppage time to win 2–0. South Korea were nevertheless eliminated at the group stage.

Koo made his final international appearances at the 2019 AFC Asian Cup. After the quarter-final defeat by Qatar, he announced his international retirement, having already decided after a tour of Australia in November 2018 that the tournament would be his last. Coach Paulo Bento had persuaded him to remain through the Asian Cup so that his experience could help the younger players. Koo later said that repeated injuries on international duty, the resulting rehabilitation and competition for his club place had contributed to his decision. He finished with 76 appearances and 19 goals.

== Style of play ==
Koo showed his best performance when playing as an attacking midfielder, although he started his professional career as a defensive midfielder. He could play as a central midfielder, second striker, or winger if necessary. He was praised for his techniques, especially a talent for getting out of opponents' pressure with the ball. He also had an ability to find the back of the net, often displaying a knack to charge into the opposition penalty box unsighted. However, his individual ability was occasionally criticised for slowing his team's tempo.

== Personal life ==
Koo likes to go shopping in his spare time in Germany. He is currently the honorary ambassador for The Republic of Korea Air Force. Koo is also a close friend with his teammate Ki Sung-yueng, and they like to display their friendly, humorous conversations on Twitter. Ki revealed on the Korean talk show Healing Camp, Aren't You Happy that Koo has a nickname called "Koogle Georim" (구글거림) because of his sometimes goofy way of talking. On 24 June 2013, Koo married a Jeju woman three years his senior at the Sheraton Grande Walkerhill Hotel.

== Filmography ==
=== Television ===
Year	Title	Role	Notes	Ref.
2025	Shooting Star Season 2	Himself		
2025	The Gentlemen's League 4	Himself		
2025	Kick a Goal: Legend Match South Korea–Japan	Himself		

== Career statistics ==
=== Club ===
As of match played 24 November 2024

Appearances and goals by club, season and competition
Club	Season	League			National cup (Note: Includes Korean FA Cup, DFB-Pokal, Amir of Qatar Cup)		League cup (Note: Includes Korean League Cup, QSL Cup)		Continental		Other		Total	
Club	Season	Division	Apps	Goals	Apps	Goals	Apps	Goals	Apps	Goals	Apps	Goals	Apps	Goals
Jeju United	2007	K League	10	1	1	0	6	0	—		—		17	1
Jeju United	2008	K League	9	0	0	0	5	0	—		—		14	0
Jeju United	2009	K League	22	1	2	1	6	1	—		—		30	3
Jeju United	2010	K League	26	5	4	0	1	0	—		3 (Note: Appearances in K League Championship)	0	34	5
Jeju United	Total		67	7	7	1	18	1	—		3	0	95	9
VfL Wolfsburg	2010–11	Bundesliga	10	0	0	0	—		—		—		10	0
VfL Wolfsburg	2011–12	Bundesliga	12	0	0	0	—		—		—		12	0
VfL Wolfsburg	2013–14	Bundesliga	10	0	2	0	—		—		—		12	0
VfL Wolfsburg	Total		32	0	2	0	—		—		—		34	0
FC Augsburg (loan)	2011–12	Bundesliga	15	5	0	0	—		—		—		15	5
FC Augsburg (loan)	2012–13	Bundesliga	21	3	1	0	—		—		—		22	3
FC Augsburg (loan)	Total		36	8	1	0	—		—		—		37	8
Mainz 05	2013–14	Bundesliga	14	1	0	0	—		—		—		14	1
Mainz 05	2014–15	Bundesliga	23	5	1	1	—		2 (Note: Appearances in UEFA Europa League)	1	—		26	7
Mainz 05	2015–16	Bundesliga	2	0	0	0	—		—		—		2	0
Mainz 05	Total		39	6	1	1	—		2	1	—		42	8
FC Augsburg	2015–16	Bundesliga	27	8	1	0	—		8	0	—		36	8
FC Augsburg	2016–17	Bundesliga	23	2	2	1	—		—		—		25	3
FC Augsburg	2017–18	Bundesliga	28	2	1	0	—		—		—		29	2
FC Augsburg	2018–19	Bundesliga	26	2	2	0	—		—		—		28	2
FC Augsburg	Total		104	14	6	1	—		8	0	—		118	15
Al-Gharafa	2019–20	Qatar Stars League	18	1	0	0	1	0	—		—		19	1
Al-Gharafa	2020–21	Qatar Stars League	20	5	1	0	4	2	1 (Note: Appearances in AFC Champions League)	0	2 (Note: Appearances in Qatar FA Cup)	0	28	7
Al-Gharafa	Total		38	6	1	0	5	2	1	0	—		47	8
Al-Khor	2021–22	Qatar Stars League	8	0	0	0	3	0	—		—		11	0
Jeju United	2022	K League 1	9	1	0	0	—		—		—		9	1
Jeju United	2023	K League 1	16	0	1	1	—		—		—		17	1
Jeju United	2024	K League 1	3	0	1	0	—		—		—		4	0
Jeju United	Total		28	1	2	1	—		—		—		30	2
Career total			352	42	20	4	26	3	11	1	5	0	414	50

=== International ===
As of 25 January 2019

Appearances and goals by national team and year
National team	Year	Apps	Goals
South Korea	2008	2	0
South Korea	2010	8	2
South Korea	2011	15	7
South Korea	2012	3	1
South Korea	2013	6	2
South Korea	2014	8	1
South Korea	2015	8	3
South Korea	2016	7	2
South Korea	2017	8	1
South Korea	2018	7	0
South Korea	2019	4	0
Career total		76	19

Scores and results list South Korea's goal tally first.

List of international goals scored by Koo Ja-cheol
No.	Date	Venue	Cap	Opponent	Score	Result	Competition
1	9 January 2010	Rand Stadium, Johannesburg, South Africa	3	Zambia	2–4	2–4	Friendly
2	7 February 2010	National Olympic Stadium, Tokyo, Japan	6	Hong Kong	2–0	5–0	2010 EAFF Championship
3	10 January 2011	Thani bin Jassim Stadium, Al Rayyan, Qatar	11	Bahrain	1–0	2–1	2011 AFC Asian Cup
4	10 January 2011	Thani bin Jassim Stadium, Al Rayyan, Qatar	11	Bahrain	2–0	2–1	2011 AFC Asian Cup
5	14 January 2011	Thani bin Jassim Stadium, Al Rayyan, Qatar	12	Australia	1–0	1–1	2011 AFC Asian Cup
6	18 January 2011	Thani bin Jassim Stadium, Al Rayyan, Qatar	13	India	2–0	4–1	2011 AFC Asian Cup
7	28 January 2011	Jassim bin Hamad Stadium, Al Rayyan, Qatar	16	Uzbekistan	1–0	3–2	2011 AFC Asian Cup
8	7 June 2011	Jeonju World Cup Stadium, Jeonju, South Korea	19	Ghana	2–1	2–1	Friendly
9	15 November 2011	Camille Chamoun Sports City Stadium, Beirut, Lebanon	25	Lebanon	1–1	1–2	2014 FIFA World Cup qualification
10	12 June 2012	Goyang Sports Complex, Goyang, South Korea	28	Lebanon	3–0	3–0	2014 FIFA World Cup qualification
11	6 September 2013	Sungeui Arena Park, Incheon, South Korea	31	Haiti	2–1	4–1	Friendly
12	15 October 2013	Cheonan Baekseok Stadium, Cheonan, South Korea	34	Mali	1–1	3–1	Friendly
13	22 June 2014	Estádio Beira-Rio, Porto Alegre, Brazil	39	Algeria	2–4	2–4	2014 FIFA World Cup
14	27 March 2015	Daejeon World Cup Stadium, Daejeon, South Korea	45	Uzbekistan	1–0	1–1	Friendly
15	8 October 2015	Al Kuwait Sports Club Stadium, Kuwait City, Kuwait	48	Kuwait	1–0	1–0	2018 FIFA World Cup qualification
16	12 November 2015	Suwon World Cup Stadium, Suwon, South Korea	50	Myanmar	2–0	4–0	2018 FIFA World Cup qualification
17	1 September 2016	Seoul World Cup Stadium, Seoul, South Korea	52	China	3–0	3–2	2018 FIFA World Cup qualification
18	15 November 2016	Seoul World Cup Stadium, Seoul, South Korea	57	Uzbekistan	2–1	2–1	2018 FIFA World Cup qualification
19	14 November 2017	Ulsan Munsu Football Stadium, Ulsan, South Korea	65	Serbia	1–1	1–1	Friendly

== Honours ==
South Korea U23

- Summer Olympics bronze medal: 2012
- Asian Games bronze medal: 2010

South Korea

- AFC Asian Cup runner-up: 2015
- EAFF Championship: 2008

Individual

- K League All-Star: 2010
- K League 1 Best XI: 2010
- K League 1 top assist provider: 2010
- K League FANtastic Player: 2010
- AFC Asian Cup top goalscorer: 2011
- K League All-Star Game Most Valuable Player: 2013
- FC Augsburg All-time XI: 2020
