= K League Most Valuable Player Award =

Football award for players in K League

The K League Most Valuable Player Award is a football award for players in K League. The award is given to the player deemed the most valuable player in the league each season.

== Winners ==
=== K League 1 award ===
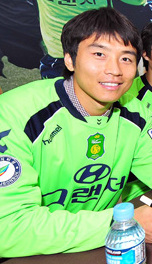
Lee Dong-gook is a four-time winner of the K League 1 MVP award.

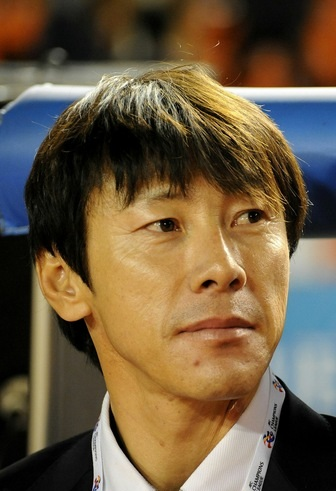
Shin Tae-yong is a two-time winner of the K League 1 MVP award.

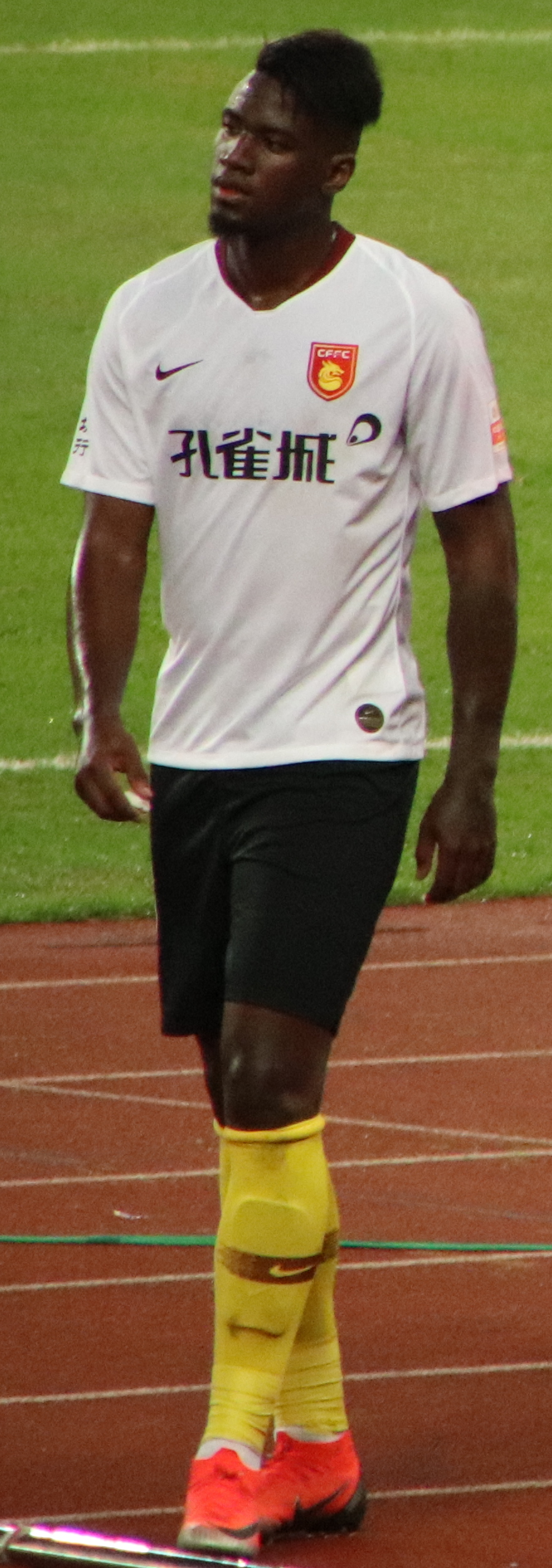
Marcão is the first player to win the MVP award at both K League 1 and K League 2.

Season	Player	Position	Club	Ref.
1983	(South Korea) Park Sung-hwa	Defender	Hallelujah FC	
1984	(South Korea) Park Chang-sun	Midfielder	Daewoo Royals	
1985	(South Korea) Han Moon-bae	Defender	Lucky-Goldstar Hwangso	
1986	(South Korea) Lee Heung-sil	Midfielder	POSCO Atoms	
1987	(South Korea) Chung Hae-won	Forward	Daewoo Royals	
1988	(South Korea) Park Kyung-hoon	Defender	POSCO Atoms	
1989	(South Korea) Noh Soo-jin	Forward	Yukong Elephants	
1990	(South Korea) Choi Jin-han	Midfielder	Lucky-Goldstar Hwangso	
1991	(South Korea) Chung Yong-hwan	Defender	Daewoo Royals	
1992	(South Korea) Hong Myung-bo	Defender	POSCO Atoms	
1993	(South Korea) Lee Sang-yoon	Midfielder	Ilhwa Chunma	
1994	(South Korea) Ko Jeong-woon	Midfielder	Ilhwa Chunma	
1995	(South Korea) Shin Tae-yong	Midfielder	Ilhwa Chunma	
1996	(South Korea) Kim Hyun-seok	Midfielder	Ulsan Hyundai Horang-i	
1997	(South Korea) Kim Joo-sung	Defender	Busan Daewoo Royals	
1998	(South Korea) Ko Jong-soo	Midfielder	Suwon Samsung Bluewings	
1999	(South Korea) Ahn Jung-hwan	Forward	Busan Daewoo Royals	
2000	(South Korea) Choi Yong-soo	Forward	Anyang LG Cheetahs	
2001	(South Korea) Shin Tae-yong (2)	Midfielder	Seongnam Ilhwa Chunma	
2002	(South Korea) Kim Dae-eui	Forward	Seongnam Ilhwa Chunma	
2003	(South Korea) Kim Do-hoon	Forward	Seongnam Ilhwa Chunma	
2004	(Brazil) Nádson	Forward	Suwon Samsung Bluewings	
2005	(South Korea) Lee Chun-soo	Midfielder	Ulsan Hyundai Horang-i	
2006	(South Korea) Kim Do-heon	Midfielder	Seongnam Ilhwa Chunma	
2007	(Brazil) André Luiz Tavares	Midfielder	Pohang Steelers	
2008	(South Korea) Lee Woon-jae	Goalkeeper	Suwon Samsung Bluewings	
2009	(South Korea) Lee Dong-gook	Forward	Jeonbuk Hyundai Motors	
2010	(South Korea) Kim Eun-jung	Forward	Jeju United	
2011	(South Korea) Lee Dong-gook (2)	Forward	Jeonbuk Hyundai Motors	
2012	(Montenegro) Dejan Damjanović	Forward	FC Seoul	
2013	(South Korea) Kim Shin-wook	Forward	Ulsan Hyundai	
2014	(South Korea) Lee Dong-gook (3)	Forward	Jeonbuk Hyundai Motors	
2015	(South Korea) Lee Dong-gook (4)	Forward	Jeonbuk Hyundai Motors	
2016	(South Korea) Jung Jo-gook	Forward	Gwangju FC	
2017	(South Korea) Lee Jae-sung	Midfielder	Jeonbuk Hyundai Motors	
2018	(Brazil) Marcão	Forward	Gyeongnam FC	
2019	(South Korea) Kim Bo-kyung	Midfielder	Ulsan Hyundai	
2020	(South Korea) Son Jun-ho	Midfielder	Jeonbuk Hyundai Motors	
2021	(South Korea) Hong Jeong-ho	Defender	Jeonbuk Hyundai Motors	
2022	(South Korea) Lee Chung-yong	Midfielder	Ulsan Hyundai	
2023	(South Korea) Kim Young-gwon	Defender	Ulsan Hyundai	
2024	(South Korea) Jo Hyeon-woo	Goalkeeper	Ulsan HD	
2025	(South Korea) Lee Dong-gyeong	Midfielder	Gimcheon Sangmu; Ulsan HD	

=== K League 2 award ===
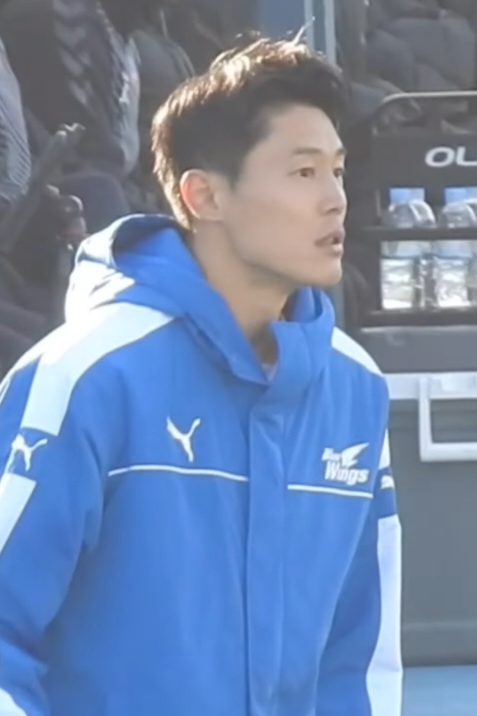
An Byong-jun is a two-time winner of the K League 2 MVP award.

Season	Player	Position	Club	Ref.
2013	(South Korea) Lee Keun-ho	Forward	Sangju Sangmu	
2014	(Brazil) Adriano Michael Jackson	Forward	Daejeon Citizen	
2015	(Brazil) Johnathan Goiano	Forward	Daegu FC	
2016	(South Korea) Kim Dong-chan	Forward	Daejeon Citizen	
2017	(Brazil) Marcão	Forward	Gyeongnam FC	
2018	(South Korea) Na Sang-ho	Forward	Gwangju FC	
2019	(South Korea) Lee Dong-jun	Midfielder	Busan IPark	
2020	(North Korea) An Byong-jun	Forward	Suwon FC	
2021	(North Korea) An Byong-jun (2)	Forward	Busan IPark	
2022	(South Korea) Ahn Young-kyu	Defender	Gwangju FC	
2023	(Brazil) Valdívia	Midfielder	Jeonnam Dragons	
2024	(Brazil) Matheus Oliveira	Forward	FC Anyang	
2025	(Guinea-Bissau) Gerso Fernandes	Forward	Incheon United	

== See also ==
- K League
- K League Top Scorer Award
- K League Top Assist Provider Award
- K League Manager of the Year Award
- K League Young Player of the Year Award
- K League FANtastic Player
- K League Best XI
- K League Players' Player of the Year
