= Johnathan Goiano =

Brazilian footballer

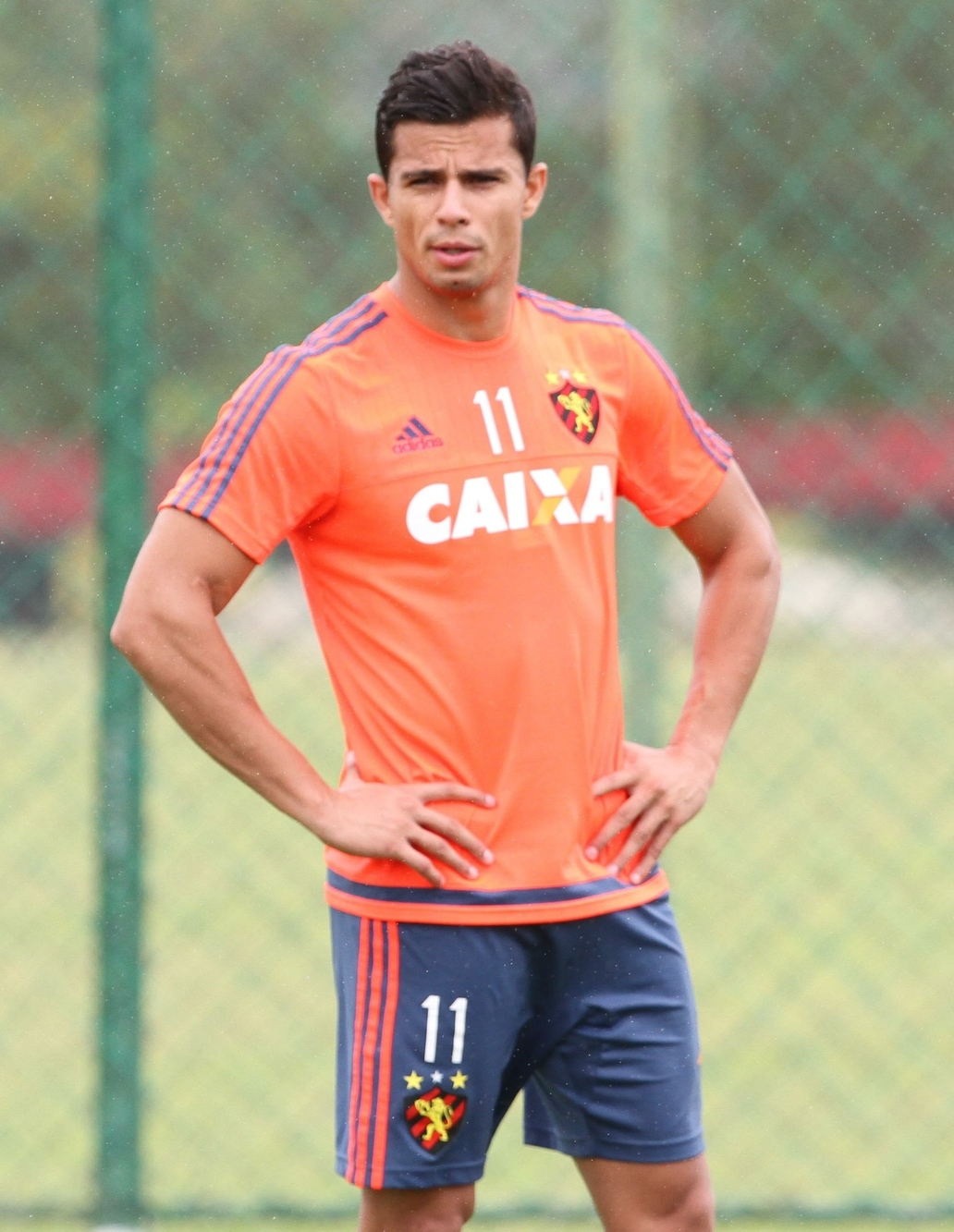
- Johnathan with Sport Recife in 2016

Personal information
- Full name: Johnathan Aparecido da Silva Vilela
- Date of birth: 29 March 1990 (age 36)
- Place of birth: Fernandópolis, São Paulo, Brazil
- Height: 1.84 m (6 ft 0 in)
- Position: Striker

Youth career
- Goiás

Senior career*
| Years | Team | Apps | (Gls) |
| 2009–2011 | Goiás | 6 | (0) |
| 2010–2011 | → Arles-Avignon (loan) | 3 | (0) |
| 2012–2017 | Itauçu | 0 | (0) |
| 2012 | → Goianésia (loan) | 10 | (4) |
| 2013 | → Central (loan) | 15 | (13) |
| 2013 | → CRAC (loan) | 5 | (0) |
| 2014 | → Central (loan) | 10 | (5) |
| 2014–2015 | → Daegu FC (loan) | 68 | (40) |
| 2016 | → Sport Recife (loan) | 3 | (0) |
| 2016–2017 | → Suwon Samsung Bluewings (loan) | 43 | (32) |
| 2018–2021 | Tianjin TEDA | 40 | (22) |
| 2021–2022 | Chengdu Rongcheng | 2 | (0) |
| 2021 | → Gwangju FC (loan) | 2 | (0) |
| Total | | 207 | (116) |
- * Club domestic league appearances and goals

Johnathan Aparecido da Silva Vilela (born 29 March 1990), commonly known as Johnathan Goiano, Johnathan Vilela, or simply Johnathan, is a former Brazilian professional footballer who played as a forward.

== Career ==
Johnathan started his professional career at Campeonato Brasileiro Série A club Goiás, but moved to several small Brazilian clubs as well as Ligue 1 club Arles-Avignon after failing to settle down at the club.

In 2014, Johnathan chose a new challenge, being loaned to South Korea's K League 2 club Daegu FC. He scored 14 goals in 29 matches during the second half of the 2014 season to renew his contract with the club. The next year, he became the league's Most Valuable Player after scoring the most goals with 26 goals in 39 appearances.

Prior to the start of the 2016 season, Johnathan received an offer from Série A club Sport Recife, returning to Brazil. However, he was once again loaned to South Korea after playing only three matches at the state league. In June 2016, he signed for K League 1 club Suwon Samsung Bluewings.

Johanthan showed his best season in 2017 by scoring the most goals among K League 1 players with 22 goals in 29 appearances. He was nicknamed "Suwon's Ronaldo" by fans who watched his performances. At the end of the season, he became the K League 1 top goalscorer, and was selected for the K League 1 Best XI. He was the first player to become the top scorer at both the K League 1 and the K League 2.

Uli Stielike, the manager of Chinese Super League club Tianjin TEDA and a former manager of the South Korea national team, had been attracted to Johnathan's performances in South Korea, recruiting him ahead of the 2018 season. He played for Tianjin for three years.

== Career statistics ==
Appearances and goals by club, season and competition
| Club | Season | League | | | State league | | Cup | | Continental | | Other | | Total | |
| Club | Season | Division | Apps | Goals | Apps | Goals | Apps | Goals | Apps | Goals | Apps | Goals | Apps | Goals |
|---|---|---|---|---|---|---|---|---|---|---|---|---|---|---|
| Goiás | 2009 | Série A | 2 | 0 | 0 | 0 | 0 | 0 | 0 | 0 | — | | 2 | 0 |
| Goiás | 2010 | Série A | 2 | 0 | 0 | 0 | 0 | 0 | 0 | 0 | — | | 2 | 0 |
| Goiás | 2011 | Série B | 2 | 0 | 0 | 0 | 0 | 0 | — | | — | | 2 | 0 |
| Goiás | Total | | 6 | 0 | 0 | 0 | 0 | 0 | 0 | 0 | — | | 6 | 0 |
| Arles-Avignon (loan) | 2010–11 | Ligue 1 | 3 | 0 | — | | 1 | 0 | — | | — | | 4 | 0 |
| Goianésia (loan) | 2012 | — | | | 10 (Note: Appearances in the Campeonato Goiano) | 4 | — | | — | | — | | 10 | 4 |
| Central (loan) | 2013 | — | | | 15 (Note: Appearances in the Campeonato Pernambucano) | 13 | — | | — | | — | | 15 | 13 |
| CRAC (loan) | 2013 | Série C | 5 | 0 | — | | 2 | 0 | — | | — | | 7 | 0 |
| Central (loan) | 2014 | — | | | 10 | 5 | — | | — | | — | | 10 | 5 |
| Daegu FC (loan) | 2014 | K League 2 | 29 | 14 | — | | 0 | 0 | — | | — | | 29 | 14 |
| Daegu FC (loan) | 2015 | K League 2 | 39 | 26 | — | | 1 | 0 | — | | — | | 40 | 26 |
| Daegu FC (loan) | Total | | 68 | 40 | — | | 1 | 0 | — | | — | | 69 | 40 |
| Sport Recife (loan) | 2016 | Série A | 0 | 0 | 3 | 0 | 1 | 0 | 0 | 0 | 3 (Note: Appearances in the Copa do Nordeste) | 0 | 7 | 0 |
| Suwon Samsung Bluewings (loan) | 2016 | K League 1 | 14 | 10 | — | | 4 | 4 | 0 | 0 | — | | 18 | 14 |
| Suwon Samsung Bluewings (loan) | 2017 | K League 1 | 29 | 22 | — | | 4 | 1 | 5 | 4 | — | | 38 | 27 |
| Suwon Samsung Bluewings (loan) | Total | | 43 | 32 | — | | 8 | 5 | 5 | 4 | — | | 56 | 41 |
| Tianjin TEDA | 2018 | Chinese Super League | 14 | 8 | — | | 2 | 1 | — | | — | | 16 | 9 |
| Tianjin TEDA | 2019 | Chinese Super League | 22 | 13 | — | | 1 | 1 | — | | — | | 23 | 14 |
| Tianjin TEDA | 2020 | Chinese Super League | 4 | 1 | — | | 0 | 0 | — | | — | | 4 | 1 |
| Tianjin TEDA | Total | | 40 | 22 | — | | 3 | 2 | — | | — | | 43 | 24 |
| Chengdu Rongcheng | 2022 | Chinese Super League | 2 | 0 | — | | 0 | 0 | — | | — | | 2 | 0 |
| Gwangju FC (loan) | 2021 | K League 1 | 2 | 0 | — | | 0 | 0 | — | | — | | 2 | 0 |
| Career total | | | 169 | 94 | 38 | 22 | 16 | 7 | 5 | 4 | 3 | 0 | 231 | 127 |

== Honours ==
Suwon Samsung Bluewings

- Korean FA Cup: 2016

Individual

- K League 2 Most Valuable Player: 2015
- K League 2 top goalscorer: 2015
- K League 2 Best XI: 2015
- K League 1 top goalscorer: 2017
- K League FANtastic Player: 2017
- K League 1 Best XI: 2017
