= An Byong-jun =

North Korean footballer (born 1990)

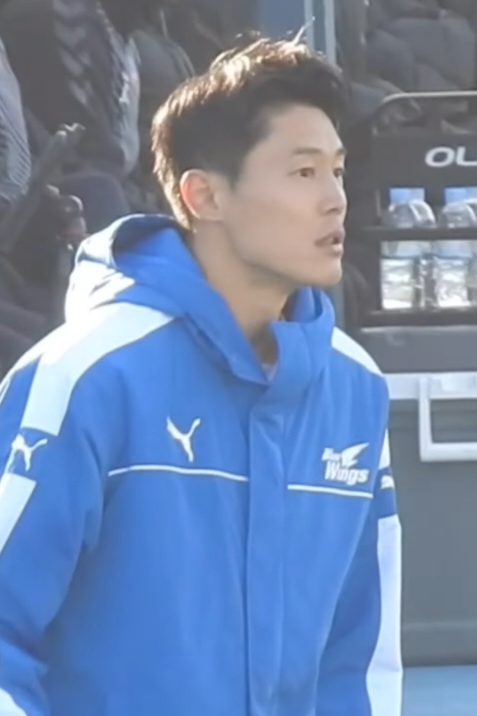
- An with Suwon Samsung Bluewings in 2023

Personal information
- Date of birth: 22 May 1990 (age 36)
- Place of birth: Kokubunji, Japan
- Height: 1.83 m (6 ft 0 in)
- Position: Striker

College career
Years	Team	Apps	(Gls)
2009–2012	Chuo University		

Senior career*
Years	Team	Apps	(Gls)
2013–2016	Kawasaki Frontale	7	(1)
2015	→ JEF United Chiba (loan)	10	(0)
2016	→ Zweigen Kanazawa (loan)	15	(2)
2017–2018	Roasso Kumamoto	69	(17)
2019–2020	Suwon FC	42	(28)
2021–2022	Busan IPark	48	(27)
2022–2023	Suwon Samsung Bluewings	47	(12)
2024	Busan IPark	12	(0)
2024	Suwon FC	6	(0)
Total		256	(87)

International career
2011–2017	North Korea	11	(0)
- * Club domestic league appearances and goals

- An Byong-jun
- Hangul: 안병준
- Hanja: 安柄俊
- RR: An Byeongjun
- MR: An Pyŏngjun

An Byong-jun (Korean: 안병준; Hanja: 安柄俊; born 22 May 1990), also known as An Byonjun (Japanese: 安柄俊, アン・ビョンジュン), is a former footballer who played as a striker. Born in Japan, he represented North Korea at international level.

== Family and early life ==
His parents moved to Japan at a time when Korea was ruled by Japan. He was born in and is a permanent resident of Japan, but can hold a North Korean passport and represent that country internationally in football, while still being able to work in South Korea.

== Club career ==
An began playing football professionally in Japan in 2013. He played for Kawasaki Frontale in the top-tier J1 League in 2014 and 2015, making three starts in seven matches and scoring once. In 2016, he was with Zweigen Kanazawa in J2 League, starting 10 times in 15 matches and scoring two goals, followed by two years with Roasso Kumamoto, also in J2, starting 61 times in 69 matches, scoring 7 goals in 2017 and 11 in 2018.

An played in South Korea beginning in 2019, joining Suwon FC in K League 2. He became the top goalscorer in the K League 2 for two consecutive years in 2020 (21 goals) and 2021 (23), the latter with Busan IPark. He is the first player to win the K League 2 Most Valuable Player Award twice. Afterwards, he was nicknamed "Lewandongmuski", a combination of "Lewandowski" and "dongmu" (which means "friend" or "comrade" in North Korean dialect) by South Korean fans. In 2022 and 2023, he played for Suwon Samsung Bluewings, amassing seven goals in 2022 and five goals and two assists in 2023. The next year, he had one assist. At the end of 2024, he announced his retirement.

== International career ==
Born in Japan, he played for the North Korea national team at the 2015 AFC Asian Cup qualification, the 2018 FIFA World Cup qualification, and the 2017 EAFF E-1 Football Championship. He was also a member of the North Korea under-17 team for the 2007 FIFA U-17 World Cup held in South Korea, but did not make an appearance at the tournament.

== Personal life ==
An has a South Korean wife, and his son and daughter have South Korean citizenship.

== Career statistics ==
=== Club ===
Appearances and goals by club, season and competition
Club	Season	League			National cup		League cup		Other		Total	
Club	Season	Division	Apps	Goals	Apps	Goals	Apps	Goals	Apps	Goals	Apps	Goals
Kawasaki Frontale	2013	J1 League	0	0	0	0	1	0	—		1	0
Kawasaki Frontale	2014	J1 League	5	1	0	0	0	0	—		5	1
Kawasaki Frontale	2015	J1 League	2	0	—		0	0	—		2	0
Kawasaki Frontale	Total		7	1	0	0	1	0	—		8	1
JEF United Chiba	2015	J2 League	10	0	1	2	—		—		11	2
Zweigen Kanazawa	2016	J2 League	15	2	1	0	—		—		16	2
Roasso Kumamoto	2017	J2 League	33	7	0	0	—		—		33	7
Roasso Kumamoto	2018	J2 League	36	10	0	0	—		—		36	10
Roasso Kumamoto	Total		69	17	0	0	—		—		69	17
Suwon FC	2019	K League 2	17	8	1	1	—		—		18	9
Suwon FC	2020	K League 2	25	20	0	0	—		1 (Note: Appearances in K League 2 promotion play-offs)	1	26	21
Suwon FC	Total		42	28	1	1	—		1	1	44	30
Busan IPark	2021	K League 2	34	23	1	1	—		—		35	24
Busan IPark	2022	K League 2	14	4	2	1	—		—		16	5
Busan IPark	Total		48	27	3	2	—		—		51	29
Suwon Samsung Bluewings	2022	K League 1	18	7	—		—		2 (Note: Appearances in K League promotion-relegation play-offs)	1	20	8
Suwon Samsung Bluewings	2023	K League 1	29	5	1	1	—		—		30	6
Suwon Samsung Bluewings	Total		47	12	1	1	—		2	1	50	14
Busan IPark	2024	K League 2	12	0	1	0	—		—		13	0
Suwon FC	2024	K League 1	6	0	—		—		—		6	0
Career total			256	87	8	6	1	0	3	2	268	95

=== International ===
Appearances and goals by national team and year
National team	Year	Apps	Goals
North Korea	2011	2	0
North Korea	2015	6	0
North Korea	2017	3	0
Total		11	0

== Honours ==
Individual

- K League 2 Most Valuable Player: 2020, 2021
- K League 2 top goalscorer: 2020, 2021
- K League 2 Best XI: 2020, 2021
