= 1988 K League =

Korean Professional Football League
- Season: 1988
- Dates: 26 March – 12 November 1988
- Champions: POSCO Atoms (2nd title)
- Asian Club Championship: Withdrew
- Matches: 60
- Goals: 133 (2.22 per match)
- Best Player: Park Kyung-hoon
- Top goalscorer: Lee Kee-keun (12 goals)
- Best goalkeeper: Oh Yun-kyo
- Highest scoring: POSCO 5–1 Lucky-Goldstar (4 June 1988)

The 1988 Korean Professional Football League was the sixth season of K League. A total of five teams participated in the league, all of them were professional teams. The season began on 26 March 1988 and ended on 12 November 1988. The season was operated in single stage, and every team played each other six times.

This season caused a controversy over the selection of the Most Valuable Player. The majority opinion of outsiders was that Lee Kee-keun should receive the MVP Award, but the Korean Professional Football Committee chose Park Kyung-hoon, who played only 12 games in the league due to his schedule in the national team. Park also tried to return the award, but the committee rejected his decision.

== League table ==
Pos	Team	Pld	W	D	L	GF	GA	GD	Pts
1	POSCO Atoms (C)	24	9	9	6	28	25	+3	27
2	Hyundai Horang-i	24	10	5	9	30	25	+5	25
3	Yukong Elephants	24	8	8	8	25	24	+1	24
4	Lucky-Goldstar Hwangso	24	6	11	7	22	29	−7	23
5	Daewoo Royals	24	8	5	11	28	30	−2	21

Source: RSSSF
(C) Champions

== Top scorers ==
Rank	Scorer	Club	Goals
1	(South Korea) Lee Kee-keun	POSCO Atoms	12
2	(South Korea) Ham Hyun-gi	Hyundai Horang-i	10
3	(South Korea) Shin Dong-chul	Yukong Elephants	8
4	(South Korea) Hwangbo Kwan	Yukong Elephants	7
4	(South Korea) Lee Hak-jong	Hyundai Horang-i	7

== Awards ==
=== Main awards ===
Award	Winner	Club
Most Valuable Player	(South Korea) Park Kyung-hoon	POSCO Atoms
Top goalscorer	(South Korea) Lee Kee-keun	POSCO Atoms
Top assist provider	(South Korea) Kim Jong-boo	POSCO Atoms
Rookie of the Year	(South Korea) Hwangbo Kwan	Yukong Elephants
Manager of the Year	(South Korea) Lee Hoe-taik	POSCO Atoms
Best Goalkeeper	(South Korea) Oh Yun-kyo	Hyundai Horang-i
Fighting Spirit Award	(South Korea) Choi Jin-han	Lucky-Goldstar Hwangso
Fighting Spirit Award	(South Korea) Son Hyung-sun	Daewoo Royals
Exemplary Award	(South Korea) Choi Kang-hee	Hyundai Horang-i
Best Referee	(South Korea) Lee Do-ha	—

=== Best XI ===
Position	Winner	Club
Goalkeeper	(South Korea) Oh Yun-kyo	Hyundai Horang-i
Defenders	(South Korea) Choi Kang-hee	Hyundai Horang-i
Defenders	(South Korea) Choi Tae-jin	Daewoo Royals
Defenders	(South Korea) Son Hyung-sun	Daewoo Royals
Defenders	(South Korea) Kang Tae-sik	POSCO Atoms
Midfielders	(South Korea) Choi Jin-han	Lucky-Goldstar Hwangso
Midfielders	(South Korea) Kim Sang-ho	POSCO Atoms
Midfielders	(South Korea) Hwangbo Kwan	Yukong Elephants
Forwards	(South Korea) Lee Kee-keun	POSCO Atoms
Forwards	(South Korea) Ham Hyun-gi	Hyundai Horang-i
Forwards	(South Korea) Shin Dong-chul	Yukong Elephants
