= K League Top Scorer Award =

South Korean football award

The K League Top Scorer Award has been awarded to the top goalscorers of K League since the inaugural 1983 season.

== Winners ==
=== K League 1 award ===
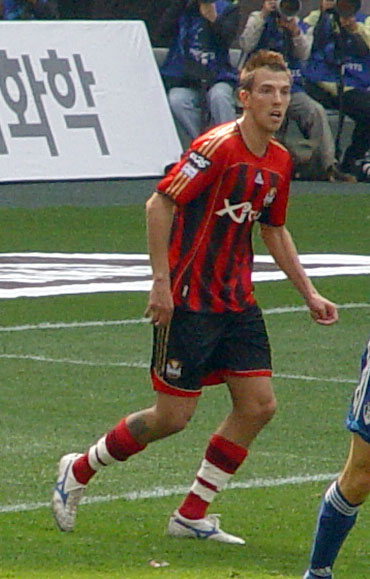
Dejan Damjanović is a three-time winner of the K League 1 top goalscorer award.

Season	Player	Club	Goals	Apps	Ratio
1983	(South Korea) Park Yoon-ki	Yukong Elephants	9	14	0.64
1984	(South Korea) Baek Jong-chul	Hyundai Horang-i	16	28	0.57
1985	(Thailand) Piyapong Pue-on	Lucky-Goldstar Hwangso	12	21	0.57
1986	(South Korea) Chung Hae-won	Daewoo Royals	10	19	0.53
1987	(South Korea) Choi Sang-kook	POSCO Atoms	15	30	0.5
1988	(South Korea) Lee Kee-keun	POSCO Atoms	12	23	0.52
1989	(South Korea) Cho Keung-yeon	POSCO Atoms	20	39	0.51
1990	(South Korea) Yoon Sang-chul	Lucky-Goldstar Hwangso	12	30	0.4
1991	(South Korea) Lee Kee-keun (2)	POSCO Atoms	16	37	0.43
1992	(South Korea) Lim Keun-jae	LG Cheetahs	10	30	0.33
1993	(South Korea) Cha Sang-hae	POSCO Atoms	10	23	0.43
1994	(South Korea) Yoon Sang-chul (2)	LG Cheetahs	21	28	0.75
1995	(South Korea) Roh Sang-rae	Chunnam Dragons	15	26	0.58
1996	(South Korea) Shin Tae-yong	Cheonan Ilhwa Chunma	18	24	0.75
1997	(South Korea) Kim Hyun-seok	Ulsan Hyundai Horang-i	9	17	0.53
1998	(South Korea) Yoo Sang-chul	Ulsan Hyundai Horang-i	14	20	0.7
1999	(Federal Republic of Yugoslavia) Saša Drakulić	Suwon Samsung Bluewings	18	26	0.69
2000	(South Korea) Kim Do-hoon	Jeonbuk Hyundai Motors	12	20	0.6
2001	(Brazil) Sandro Cardoso	Suwon Samsung Bluewings	13	22	0.59
2002	(Portugal) Edmilson	Jeonbuk Hyundai Motors	14	27	0.52
2003	(South Korea) Kim Do-hoon (2)	Seongnam Ilhwa Chunma	28	40	0.7
2004	(Brazil) Mota	Jeonnam Dragons	14	22	0.64
2005	(Brazil) Leandro Machado	Ulsan Hyundai Horang-i	13	17	0.76
2006	(South Korea) Woo Sung-yong	Seongnam Ilhwa Chunma	16	28	0.57
2007	(Brazil) Caboré	Gyeongnam FC	17	25	0.68
2008	(Brazil) Dudu	Seongnam Ilhwa Chunma	15	26	0.58
2009	(South Korea) Lee Dong-gook	Jeonbuk Hyundai Motors	20	27	0.74
2010	(South Korea) Yoo Byung-soo	Incheon United	22	28	0.79
2011	(Montenegro) Dejan Damjanović	FC Seoul	23	29	0.79
2012	(Montenegro) Dejan Damjanović (2)	FC Seoul	31	42	0.74
2013	(Montenegro) Dejan Damjanović (3)	FC Seoul	19	29	0.66
2014	(Brazil) Júnior Santos	Suwon Samsung Bluewings	14	35	0.4
2015	(South Korea) Kim Shin-wook	Ulsan Hyundai	18	38	0.47
2016	(South Korea) Jung Jo-gook	Gwangju FC	20	31	0.65
2017	(Brazil) Johnathan Goiano	Suwon Samsung Bluewings	22	29	0.76
2018	(Brazil) Marcão	Gyeongnam FC	26	31	0.84
2019	(Australia) Adam Taggart	Suwon Samsung Bluewings	20	33	0.61
2020	(Brazil) Júnior Negrão	Ulsan Hyundai	26	27	0.96
2021	(South Korea) Joo Min-kyu	Jeju United	22	34	0.65
2022	(South Korea) Cho Gue-sung	Gimcheon Sangmu; Jeonbuk Hyundai Motors	17	31	0.55
2023	(South Korea) Joo Min-kyu (2)	Ulsan Hyundai	17	36	0.47
2024	(Montenegro) Stefan Mugoša	Incheon United	15	38	0.39
2025	(Syria) Pablo Sabbag	Suwon FC	17	34	0.5

=== K League 2 award ===
Season	Player	Club	Goals	Apps	Ratio
2013	(South Korea) Lee Keun-ho	Sangju Sangmu	15	25	0.6
2014	(Brazil) Adriano Michael Jackson	Daejeon Citizen	27	32	0.84
2015	(Brazil) Johnathan Goiano	Daegu FC	26	39	0.67
2016	(South Korea) Kim Dong-chan	Daejeon Citizen	20	39	0.51
2017	(Brazil) Marcão	Gyeongnam FC	22	32	0.69
2018	(South Korea) Na Sang-ho	Gwangju FC	16	31	0.52
2019	(Brazil) Felipe	Gwangju FC	19	27	0.7
2020	(North Korea) An Byong-jun	Suwon FC	21	26	0.81
2021	(North Korea) An Byong-jun (2)	Busan IPark	23	34	0.68
2022	(South Korea) Yu Kang-hyun	Chungnam Asan	19	40	0.48
2023	(Colombia) Luis Mina	Gimpo FC	16	34	0.47
2024	(Brazil) Bruno Mota	Cheonan City	16	35	0.46
2025	(Montenegro) Stefan Mugoša	Incheon United	20	35	0.57

== See also ==
- K League records and statistics
- K League MVP Award
- K League Top Assist Provider Award
- K League Manager of the Year Award
- K League Young Player of the Year Award
- K League FANtastic Player
- K League Best XI
- K League Players' Player of the Year
