= K League FANtastic Player =

Annual football award in South Korea

The K League 'FAN'tastic Player is an annual award given to the player who is judged to have been the best of the year in South Korea. The word 'Fan'tastic means that a fanstasic player is chosen by fans. The award has been presented since the 2009 season and the winner is chosen by an online poll by K League fans.

== Winners ==
Season	Player	Position	Club
2009	(South Korea) Lee Dong-gook	Forward	Jeonbuk Hyundai Motors
2010	(South Korea) Koo Ja-cheol	Midfielder	Jeju United
2011	(South Korea) Lee Dong-gook (2)	Forward	Jeonbuk Hyundai Motors
2012	(Montenegro) Dejan Damjanović	Forward	FC Seoul
2013	(South Korea) Kim Shin-wook	Forward	Ulsan Hyundai
2014	(South Korea) Lee Dong-gook (3)	Forward	Jeonbuk Hyundai Motors
2015	(South Korea) Lee Dong-gook (4)	Forward	Jeonbuk Hyundai Motors
2016	(Brazil) Leonardo	Midfielder	Jeonbuk Hyundai Motors
2017	(Brazil) Johnathan Goiano	Forward	Suwon Samsung Bluewings

== See also ==
- K League
- K League MVP Award
- K League Top Scorer Award
- K League Top Assist Provider Award
- K League Manager of the Year Award
- K League Young Player of the Year Award
- K League Best XI
- K League Players' Player of the Year
