= Arsenio Luzardo =

Uruguayan footballer (born 1959)

Personal information
- Full name: Roberto Arsenio Luzardo Correa
- Date of birth: 3 September 1959 (age 67)
- Place of birth: Treinta y Tres, Uruguay
- Height: 1.80 m (5 ft 11 in)
- Position: Midfielder

Senior career*
Years	Team	Apps	(Gls)
1980–1985	Club Nacional	101	(28)
1985–1992	Recreativo de Huelva	194	(56)
1992–1993	LG Cheetahs	13	(1)
1993–1994	US Biskra	50	(14)

International career
1979	Uruguay U20		
1980–1983	Uruguay	11	(2)
Medal record
Representing Uruguay
Copa América
Winner	1983
Copa de Oro
Winner	1980 Uruguay
- * Club domestic league appearances and goals

Roberto Arsenio Luzardo Correa, commonly known as Arsenio Luzardo (born 3 September 1959), is a former Uruguayan footballer.

== Club career ==
Luzardo played for Club Nacional de Football, Recreativo de Huelva, LG Cheetahs, and US Biskra.

== International career ==
He was in squad of Uruguay under-20 team at the 1979 FIFA World Youth Championship. He has also played with the senior team at the 1983 Copa América.

== Honours ==
=== Player ===
Uruguay national football team

- Copa América Winner (1): 1983

Club Nacional

- Uruguayan Primera División Winner (2): 1980, 1983
- Copa Libertadores Winner (1): 1980

LG Cheetahs

- K League Runner-up (1): 1993
- League Cup Runner-up (1): 1992

=== Individual ===
- South America Youth Football Championship top scorer: 1979
- Copa Libertadores top scorer: 1983
