= Kang Tae-sik =

South Korean footballer (born 1963)

Kang Tae-sik 강태식
Personal information
- Full name: Kang Tae-sik
- Date of birth: March 15, 1963 (age 63)
- Place of birth: South Korea
- Height: 1.74 m (5 ft 8 1/2 in)
- Position: Defender

Youth career
- 1982–1985: Hanyang University

Senior career*
| Years | Team | Apps | (Gls) |
| 1986–1989 | POSCO Atoms | 89 | (3) |

International career
| 1988 | South Korea | 3 | (0) |
- * Club domestic league appearances and goals

- Kang Tae-sik
- Hangul: 강태식
- Hanja: 姜太植
- RR: Gang Taesik
- MR: Kang T'aesik

Kang Tae-sik (Korean: 강태식; born March 15, 1963) is a South Korean former footballer who played as a defender.

He started his professional career at POSCO Atoms in 1986, and was named to the K League Best XI team in 1988.
