= K League Players' Player of the Year =

The K League Players' Player of the Year is an annual award given to the player who is adjudged to have been the best of the year in South Korea. The award has been presented since 2007 and the winner is chosen by a vote amongst the members of the K League players.

This award was arranged by Korean edition of FourFourTwo, and was not an official award of K League. It was presented in summer unlike the K League MVP Award.

== Winners ==
Year	Rank	Player	Club	Position	Points	Voters	Ref.
2007	1st	(South Korea) Kim Do-heon	Seongnam Ilhwa Chunma	Midfielder	365	100	
2007	2nd	(Brazil) Mota	Seongnam Ilhwa Chunma	Forward	265	100	
2007	3rd	(South Korea) Lee Chun-soo	Ulsan Hyundai	Forward	189	100	
2008	1st	(Brazil) Mota	Seongnam Ilhwa Chunma	Forward	461	124	
2008	2nd	(South Korea) Park Chu-young	FC Seoul	Forward	232	124	
2008	3rd	(Brazil) Dudu	Seongnam Ilhwa Chunma	Forward	187	124	
2009	1st	(South Korea) Ki Sung-yueng	FC Seoul	Midfielder	63	143	
2009	2nd	(Brazil) Luiz Henrique	Jeonbuk Hyundai Motors	Midfielder	60	143	
2009	3rd	(Brazil) Edu	Suwon Samsung Bluewings	Forward	54	143	
2010	1st	(Montenegro) Dejan Damjanović	FC Seoul	Forward	91	148	
2010	2nd	(Colombia) Mauricio Molina	Seongnam Ilhwa Chunma	Midfielder	80	148	
2010	3rd	(South Korea) Kim Jung-woo	Gwangju Sangmu	Midfielder	61	148	

== See also ==
- K League MVP Award
- K League Top Scorer Award
- K League Top Assist Provider Award
- K League Manager of the Year Award
- K League Young Player of the Year Award
- K League FANtastic Player
- K League Best XI
