= Byun Jae-sub =

South Korean footballer (born 1975)

Personal information
- Date of birth: September 17, 1975 (age 51)
- Place of birth: South Korea
- Height: 1.70 m (5 ft 7 in)

Youth career
- 1993–1997: Jeonju University

Senior career*
Years	Team	Apps	(Gls)
1997–2003	Jeonbuk Hyundai Motors	94	(7)
2004–2006	Bucheon SK / Jeju United	49	(3)
2007	Jeonbuk Hyundai Motors	3	(0)

International career^{‡}
1994	South Korea U-20	?	(?)

Managerial career
- ?: Jeonju University (coach)
- * Club domestic league appearances and goals as of 17 August 2011 ‡ National team caps and goals as of 17 August 2011

- Byun Jae-sub
- Hangul: 변재섭
- RR: Byeon Jaeseop
- MR: Pyŏn Chaesŏp

Byun Jae-sub (born September 17, 1975) is a South Korean former footballer.

He graduated in Jeonju University, He was the K-League Top Assistor of 1999 season

== Honours ==
=== Individual ===
- K-League Top Assistor : 1999
