= Kim Jun-hyun (footballer) =

South Korean footballer

Kim Jun-Hyun
Personal information
- Full name: Kim Jun-Hyun
- Date of birth: January 20, 1964 (age 62)
- Place of birth: South Korea
- Height: 1.77 m (5 ft 9 1/2 in)

Youth career
- 1983–1987: Yonsei University

Senior career*
Years	Team	Apps	(Gls)
1986	Daewoo Royals	3	(0)
1987–1992	Yukong Elephants	117	(9)

International career^{‡}
1984–1986	South Korea	?	(?)

Managerial career
- ?–2003: Yonsei University
- 2003: 2003 Summer Universiade
- 2007: Super Reds FC
- * Club domestic league appearances and goals as of 17 August 2011 ‡ National team caps and goals as of 17 August 2011

Kim Jun-Hyun (born January 20, 1964) is a South Korean footballer

He graduated in Yonsei University, He was the Top Assistor of K-League

== Honours ==
=== Player ===
- Yukong Elephants
- K-League Winners (1) : 1989

=== Individual ===
- 1991 : K-League Top Assistor
