= Kim Wan-su =

North Korean politician

- Hangul: 김완수
- RR: Gim Wansu
- MR: Kim Wansu

Kim Wan-su (Korean: 김완수; born 10 May 1939) is the Vice Chairman of the Supreme People's Assembly (SPA) of the Democratic People's Republic of Korea (DPRK, North Korea). He was demoted from his positions as President of the Central Bank of the Democratic People's Republic of Korea and as Minister of Finance by the SPA in September 2009, five months after his appointment. He was also the deputy finance minister and became the president of the Central Bank of the DPRK in October 2004 when former President Jong Song-thaek was dismissed (according to Radio Pyongyang).

He attended the annual central bank governors meeting of the Bank for International Settlements (BIS) in Basel, Switzerland, in June 2005. At the meeting, he met Bank of Japan Governor Toshihiko Fukui at the evening reception and exchanged brief words.
