= Zoran Vukčević =

Montenegrin footballer

Personal information
- Date of birth: 7 February 1972 (age 54)
- Place of birth: SFR Yugoslavia
- Height: 1.81 m (5 ft 11 in)
- Position: Forward

Senior career*
Years	Team	Apps	(Gls)
1992-1993	Borac Banja Luka	22	(3)
1993	Hyundai Horang-i	10	(1)
1994-1998	Chaves	12	(0)
1994-1995	→ Portimonense (loan)	29	(6)
1995–1996	→ Feirense (loan)	30	(11)
1997–1998	→ Marco (loan)		
1998-1999	Mogren Budva	3	(0)
2000-2001	Mura	8	(0)
- * Club domestic league appearances and goals

Zoran Vukčević (born 7 February 1972) is a Montenegrin retired footballer who played as a forward.

== Club career ==
In July 1993, Vukčević joined Hyundai Horang-i in K League, after a season at Borac Banja Luka.
