= Pohang Sports Complex =

Multi-use stadium in Pohang, South Korea

- Interactive map of Pohang Sports Complex
- Former names: Pohang Civic Stadium
- Location: 313-1 Daedo-dong, Nam-gu, Pohang-si, Gyeongsangbuk-do, South Korea
- Coordinates: 36°00′31″N 129°21′49″E
- Owner: City of Pohang
- Operator: City of Pohang
- Capacity: 22,934

Construction
- Opened: 1971

Tenant
- Pohang Steelers (1987–1990, 2013)

Pohang Sports Complex is a multi-use stadium in Pohang, South Korea. The stadium was used by the Pohang Steelers until the Pohang Steel Yard opened in 1990. The capacity of the stadium is 22,934 spectators.
