= K League Top Assist Provider Award =

South Korean football award

The K League Top Assists Award has been awarded to the top assist providers of K League since the 1983 season.

== Winners ==
=== K League 1 award ===
Season	Player	Club	Assists	Apps	Ratio
1983	(South Korea) Park Chang-sun	Hallelujah FC	6	15	0.40
1984	(Netherlands) Rob Landsbergen	Hyundai Horang-i	9	27	0.33
1985	(Thailand) Piyapong Pue-on	Lucky-Goldstar Hwangso	6	21	0.29
1986	(South Korea) Kang Deuk-soo	Lucky-Goldstar Hwangso	8	15	0.53
1987	(South Korea) Choi Sang-kook	POSCO Atoms	8	30	0.27
1988	(South Korea) Kim Jong-boo	POSCO Atoms	5	15	0.33
1989	(South Korea) Lee Heung-sil	POSCO Atoms	11	39	0.28
1990	(South Korea) Choi Dae-shik	Lucky-Goldstar Hwangso	7	29	0.24
1991	(South Korea) Kim Jun-hyun	Yukong Elephants	8	29	0.28
1992	(South Korea) Shin Dong-chul	Yukong Elephants	8	25	0.32
1993	(South Korea) Yoon Sang-chul	LG Cheetahs	8	27	0.30
1994	(South Korea) Ko Jeong-woon	Ilhwa Chunma	10	21	0.48
1995	(Bosnia and Herzegovina) Amir Teljigović	Daewoo Royals	7	26	0.27
1996	(Federal Republic of Yugoslavia) Rade Bogdanović	Pohang Atoms	14	32	0.44
1997	(Russia) Denis Laktionov	Suwon Samsung Bluewings	5	10	0.50
1998	(South Korea) Jung Jeong-soo	Ulsan Hyundai Horang-i	9	19	0.47
1999	(South Korea) Byun Jae-sub	Chonbuk Hyundai Dinos	8	25	0.32
2000	(Brazil) André Gaspar	Anyang LG Cheetahs	10	29	0.34
2001	(Federal Republic of Yugoslavia) Zoran Urumov	Busan I'Cons	10	23	0.43
2002	(South Korea) Lee Chun-soo	Ulsan Hyundai Horang-i	9	18	0.50
2003	(Portugal) Edmilson	Jeonbuk Hyundai Motors	14	39	0.36
2004	(South Korea) Hong Soon-hak	Daegu FC	6	18	0.33
2005	(Portugal) Ricardo Nascimento	FC Seoul	9	16	0.56
2006	(Brazil) Adriano Chuva	Daejeon Citizen	8	24	0.33
2007	(Brazil) André Luiz Tavares	Pohang Steelers	11	23	0.48
2008	(Brazil) Brasília	Ulsan Hyundai	6	13	0.46
2009	(Brazil) Luiz Henrique	Jeonbuk Hyundai Motors	12	28	0.43
2010	(South Korea) Koo Ja-cheol	Jeju United	11	26	0.42
2011	(South Korea) Lee Dong-gook	Jeonbuk Hyundai Motors	15	27	0.56
2012	(Colombia) Mauricio Molina	FC Seoul	19	41	0.46
2013	(Colombia) Mauricio Molina (2)	FC Seoul	13	35	0.37
2014	(South Korea) Lee Seung-gi	Jeonbuk Hyundai Motors	10	26	0.38
2015	(South Korea) Yeom Ki-hun	Suwon Samsung Bluewings	17	35	0.49
2016	(South Korea) Yeom Ki-hun (2)	Suwon Samsung Bluewings	15	34	0.44
2017	(South Korea) Son Jun-ho	Pohang Steelers	14	35	0.40
2018	(Brazil) Cesinha	Daegu FC	11	25	0.44
2019	(South Korea) Moon Seon-min	Jeonbuk Hyundai Motors	10	32	0.31
2020	(South Korea) Kang Sang-woo	Sangju Sangmu; Pohang Steelers	12	26	0.46
2021	(South Korea) Kim Bo-kyung	Jeonbuk Hyundai Motors	10	32	0.31
2022	(South Korea) Lee Ki-je	Suwon Samsung Bluewings	14	35	0.40
2023	(South Korea) Baek Sung-dong	Pohang Steelers	8	26	0.31
2024	(Brazil) Anderson Oliveira	Suwon FC	13	38	0.34
2025	(Brazil) Cesinha (2)	Daegu FC	12	25	0.48

=== K League 2 award ===
Season	Player	Club	Assists	Apps	Ratio
2013	(South Korea) Yeom Ki-hun	Police FC	11	21	0.52
2014	(South Korea) Choi Jin-ho	Gangwon FC	9	33	0.27
2015	(South Korea) Kim Jae-sung	Seoul E-Land	12	39	0.31
2016	(South Korea) Lee Ho-seok	Gyeongnam FC	10	27	0.37
2017	(South Korea) Chang Hyuk-jin	Ansan Greeners	13	33	0.39
2018	(Brazil) Rômulo	Busan IPark	9	35	0.26
2019	(South Korea) Jeong Jae-hee	Jeonnam Dragons	10	29	0.34
2020	(South Korea) Kim Young-uk	Jeju United	7	23	0.30
2021	(South Korea) Joo Hyeon-woo	FC Anyang	8	36	0.22
2022	(Ghana) Maxwell Acosty	FC Anyang	11	32	0.34
2023	(Brazil) Valdívia	Jeonnam Dragons	14	36	0.39
2024	(Brazil) Matheus Oliveira	FC Anyang	11	36	0.31
2025	(Brazil) Euller	Seoul E-Land	11	37	0.30

== See also ==
- K League
- K League records and statistics
- K League MVP Award
- K League Top Scorer Award
- K League Manager of the Year Award
- K League Young Player of the Year Award
- K League FANtastic Player
- K League Best XI
- K League Players' Player of the Year
