= Ham Hyun-gi =

South Korean footballer (born 1962)

Ham Hyun-Gi 함현기
Personal information
- Full name: Ham Hyun-Gi
- Date of birth: April 26, 1963 (age 63)
- Place of birth: Gangneung, Gangwon, South Korea
- Height: 1.70 m (5 ft 7 in)
- Position: Forward

Team information
- Current team: Mukho High School

Youth career
- 1982–1986: Korea University

Senior career*
Years	Team	Apps	(Gls)
1986–1991	Hyundai Horang-i	118	(22)
1991–1992	LG Cheetahs	24	(0)
1993–1994	Oita Trinity		

International career^{‡}
1982–1989	South Korea	10	(0)

Managerial career
- 1999–2002: Gangneung Jeil High School
- 2003–present: Mukho High School
- * Club domestic league appearances and goals as of 27 December 2007 ‡ National team caps and goals as of 27 December 2007

Ham Hyun-Gi (Korean: 함현기; born April 26, 1962, in Gangneung, South Korea) is a South Korean footballer.

He played in the Korean Professional Football League (K-League) for the Hyundai Horang-i, LG Cheetahs in South Korea and in the former Japan Football League (JFL) for the Oita Trinity in Japan.

He debuted in the K-League in 1986 playing for the Hyundai Horang-i. In the K-League's 1986 season he was awarded the Rookie of the Year award for his outstanding play having scored 8 goals during the regular season and 9 goals in the Korean Professional Championship of 1986.

He was selected a Korean national footballer for the first time in July 1982. However, he suffered from injuries and was unable to play very many matches.

In July 1991, he was traded to the LG Cheetahs because of his high guarantee. However his next year was disappointing and he left the K-League and moved to Oita Trinity which was a lower division prefectural league team at the time. During his first season with them, the team was promoted to the Kyushu League. After the 1994 season he retired to teaching high school teams in Korea. He is now the coach of the Mukho High School in Donghae, South Korea.

== Club career ==
- 1986–1991 Hyundai Horang-i
- 1991–1992 LG Cheetahs
- 1993-1994 Oita Trinity
