= Slavchev Toshev =

Bulgarian footballer

Personal information
- Full name: Slavchev Toshev
- Date of birth: 13 June 1960 (age 66)
- Height: 1.96 m (6 ft 5 in)
- Position: Goalkeeper

Senior career*
Years	Team	Apps	(Gls)
?	?	?	(?)
1993	Yukong Elephant	9	(0)
- * Club domestic league appearances and goals

Slavchev Toshev (born 13 June 1960) is a former Bulgarian footballer.

== Club career ==
He played mainly for Bulgarian football clubs, as well as for Yukong Elephant of South Korea in 1993.
