= Son Hyung-sun =

South Korean footballer (born 1964)

Son Hyung-sun 손형선
Personal information
- Full name: Son Hyung-sun
- Date of birth: February 22, 1964 (age 62)
- Place of birth: South Korea
- Height: 1.84 m (6 ft 1/2 in)
- Position: Defender

Youth career
- 1983–1986: Kwangwoon University

Senior career*
Years	Team	Apps	(Gls)
1986–1989	Daewoo Royals	96	(6)
1990–1991	POSCO Atoms	44	(1)
1992–1993	LG Cheetahs	27	(1)

International career
1988–1989	South Korea	1	(0)
- * Club domestic league appearances and goals

- Son Hyung-sun
- Hangul: 손형선
- Hanja: 孫炯先
- RR: Son Hyeongseon
- MR: Son Hyŏngsŏn

Son Hyung-sun (Korean: 손형선; born February 22, 1964 South Korea) is a South Korean former footballer who played as a defender.

He started professional career at Daewoo Royals in 1986.

He was winner of K League Best XI in 1988 K League.
