= Goran Jevtić (footballer) =

Serbian footballer

Goran
Personal information
- Full name: Goran Jevtić
- Date of birth: 10 August 1970 (age 56)
- Place of birth: SFR Yugoslavia
- Height: 1.90 m (6 ft 3 in)
- Position: Defender

Senior career*
Years	Team	Apps	(Gls)
1989–1990	Partizan	3	(0)
1992–1993	Napredak Kruševac	23	(1)
1993–1995	Hyundai Horang-i	39	(0)
1996–1997	DVSC-Epona	3	(0)
2001	Enköping	12	(1)
2002	Öster	7	(0)
2003	Ljungby		
- * Club domestic league appearances and goals

Goran Jevtić (Serbian Cyrillic: Горан Јевтић; born 10 August 1970) is a Serbian retired footballer who played as a defender.

== Club career ==
He played for FK Partizan in the Yugoslav First League in the seasons 1988–89 and 1989–90 making 3 appearances in total. He then played with Ulsan Hyundai of the South Korean K League, then known as Hyundai Horang-i.

He joined Swedish side Ljungby ahead of the 2003 season from Öster.
