= Kim Sang-jin (footballer) =

South Korean footballer (born 1967)

Kim Sang-jin 김상진
Personal information
- Full name: Kim Sang-jin
- Date of birth: February 15, 1967 (age 59)
- Place of birth: South Korea
- Height: 1.75 m (5 ft 9 in)
- Position: Forward

Youth career
- 1986–1989: Hanyang University

Senior career*
Years	Team	Apps	(Gls)
1990–1994	Lucky-Goldstar Hwangso / LG Cheetahs	83	(10)
1995–1996	Yukong / Bucheon Yukong	14	(0)
- * Club domestic league appearances and goals

- Kim Sang-jin
- Hangul: 김상진
- Hanja: 金尙鎭
- RR: Gim Sangjin
- MR: Kim Sangjin

Kim Sang-jin (Korean: 김상진; born February 15, 1967) is a former South Korean footballer who played as a forward.

He started professional career at FC Seoul then known as Lucky-Goldstar FC in 1990 and he transferred to Bucheon SK in 1995.

He was squad of South Korea Universiade team in 1987 Summer Universiade.
