= Shin Dong-chul =

South Korean footballer

Shin Dong-Chul
Personal information
- Full name: Shin Dong-Chul
- Date of birth: November 9, 1961 (age 64)
- Place of birth: South Korea
- Height: 1.69 m (5 ft 6 1/2 in)
- Position: Forward

Youth career
- 1983–1987: Myongji University

Senior career*
Years	Team	Apps	(Gls)
1983	Kookmin Bank FC	2	(1)
1984–1985	Myongji University	?	(?)
1986–1993	Yukong Elephants	121	(12)

International career^{‡}
1982–1988	South Korea	?	(?)

Managerial career
- ?: South Korea U-15
- ?: Gangneung Jungang High School
- ?: Gwangmyeong Technical High School
- * Club domestic league appearances and goals as of 17 August 2011 ‡ National team caps and goals as of 17 August 2011

Shin Dong-Chul (born November 9, 1961) is a South Korean footballer.

He graduated in Myongji University, He was the K-League Top Assistor of 1992 season.

== Honours ==
=== Player ===
- Yukong Elephants
- K-League Winners (1) : 1989

=== Individual ===
- K-League Top Assistor : 1992
- K-League Best XI : 1988, 1992
