= Pohang Steelers =

South Korean football club

- Full name: Football Club Pohang Steelers 포항 스틸러스 프로축구단
- Founded: 1 April 1973; 53 years ago (as Pohang Iron & Steel Company FC)
- Ground: Pohang Steel Yard
- Capacity: 15,546
- Owner: POSCO
- Chairman: Shin Young-gwon
- Manager: Kim Seong-jae (interim)
- League: K League 1
- 2025: K League 1, 4th of 12
- Website: www.steelers.co.kr
Home colours	Away colours

The Pohang Steelers (Hangul: 포항 스틸러스) are a South Korean professional football club based in Pohang, North Gyeongsang Province that compete in the K League 1, the top flight of South Korean football. The club was founded on 1 April 1973 as Pohang Iron & Steel Company FC, named after the steel company POSCO, which still owns the club today. They are one of South Korea's most successful teams, having won the K League five times and the AFC Champions League three times.

== History ==
The club was founded on 1 April 1973 as Pohang Iron & Steel Company FC. Upon its establishment, the team consisted of 13 players, including South Korea international Lee Hoe-taik, and was led by manager Han Hong-ki. The following year, Pohang Steel won their first trophy, beating Sungkyunkwan University 2–1 in the final of the President's Cup. The club also joined the Korean National Semi-professional Football League and won their first title in the spring league of 1975. Their second title came in the autumn league of 1981, and when the competition was re-organised as an all-year league in 1982, Pohang lifted the trophy once again.

Renamed as the Pohang Iron & Steel Dolphins, the club was one of the founding members of the Korean Super League in 1983. The same year, Pohang became the first team in the league to field foreign players, signing midfielder Sergio and forward Jose, who had previously been playing for the football team of a Brazilian steelmaking company. Initially competing as a semi-professional club, the Dolphins turned professional in the 1984 season, and rebranded again a year later, this time as the Pohang Iron & Steel Atoms.

In 1986 they won their first championship, and enjoyed a spell of domination in the league; between 1985 and 1998 they were continuously in the top four of the K League. In 1995, the club was renamed again, becoming the Pohang Atoms. This name change was an attempt to further strengthen local ties with the region, and in 1997 they adopted their current name, the Pohang Steelers. The team won the Asian Champions Cup in 1997 and 1998.

In the 2000s, the club struggled near the bottom of the table, but bounced back to the forefront of South Korean football by winning the first stage of the 2004 K League Championship. The club qualified for the final Championship match of the 2004 season, but lost 4–3 on penalties to Suwon Samsung Bluewings.

In 2007, the club won the Championship play-off by beating Seongnam Ilhwa Chunma, who had placed first in the regular season of the K League. Pohang won the first leg 3–1 at home, and then traveled to Seongnam for the second leg game, recording a 1–0 victory to seal a 4–1 aggregate triumph. The Steelers had ended the K League season in fifth place, but then defeated Gyeongnam FC, Ulsan Hyundai Horang-i, Suwon Samsung Bluewings and finally Seongnam Ilhwa Chunma in the play-offs to win the championship.

Pohang again made the play-offs in the 2008 season by finishing the season in fifth place, but were knocked out in their play-off game by Ulsan Hyundai after the penalty shoot-out. However, the club fared much better in the 2008 Korean FA Cup. After beating Seongnam Ilhwa Chunma in the quarter-finals, Pohang knocked out Daegu FC in the semi-finals and then defeated Gyeongnam FC in the final to ensure qualification for the 2009 AFC Champions League.

In the 2009 AFC Champions League, the Steelers defeated Umm-Salal of Qatar 4–1 on aggregate in the semi-finals to advance to their first ever AFC Champions League final. The Steelers defeated Saudi club Al-Ittihad 2–1 at the National Stadium in Tokyo, Japan to claim the title. For the 2009 K League season, Pohang once again qualified for the play-off phase of the league by finishing the regular season in second place, equal with FC Seoul on points, but ahead on goal difference. The Steelers had a bye to the semi-finals, but lost to Seongnam Ilhwa Chunma. Nonetheless, their regular season placing saw them qualify for the 2010 AFC Champions League Group stage.

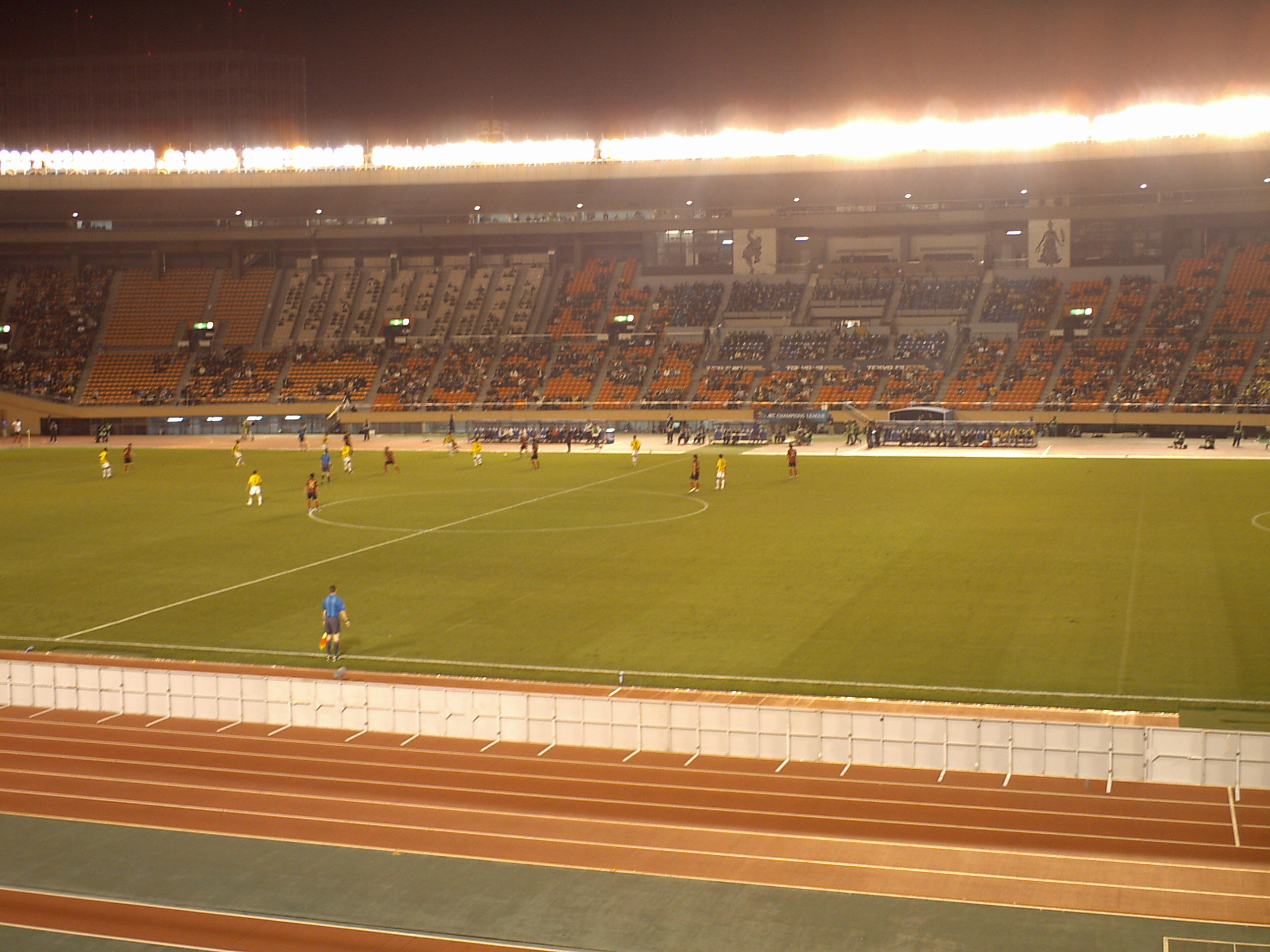
Pohang defeated Al-Ittihad in Tokyo to win their third Asian championship title in 2009

Following the conclusion of the 2009 K League season, at the 2009 FIFA Club World Cup in December, the Steelers finished in third place after defeating Mexican side Atlante 4–3 on penalties.

Pohang saw further success on the pitch under new manager Hwang Sun-hong with a unique playstyle dubbed 'Steel Taka', winning the 2012 and 2013 editions of the Korean FA Cup, and also the 2013 K League season. By winning both competitions, the Steelers became the first club to achieve a domestic double in South Korean professional football. However, the club has not won a league title since 2013 as Jeonbuk Hyundai Motors and later Ulsan rose to dominate the league, and went into an extended trophy drought.

In April 2019, Kim Gi-dong took over as manager. He led Pohang back to the top half of the league, and in 2020, they finished third in the league, qualifying for the AFC Champions League. In the 2021 AFC Champions League, the club reached the final but finished as runners-up after losing to continental rivals Al Hilal.

In 2023, Pohang celebrated their 50th anniversary by winning the FA Cup, defeating Jeonbuk Hyundai in the final and securing their first FA Cup victory in ten years.

After Kim Gi-dong left for FC Seoul in December 2023, Pohang appointed Park Tae-ha as the new manager. While they started the season well, their form deteriorated and the club finished sixth in the league. However, they won the rebranded Korea Cup in 2024, defeating rivals Ulsan HD 3–1 in extra time in the final for a second consecutive cup victory.

== Stadium ==
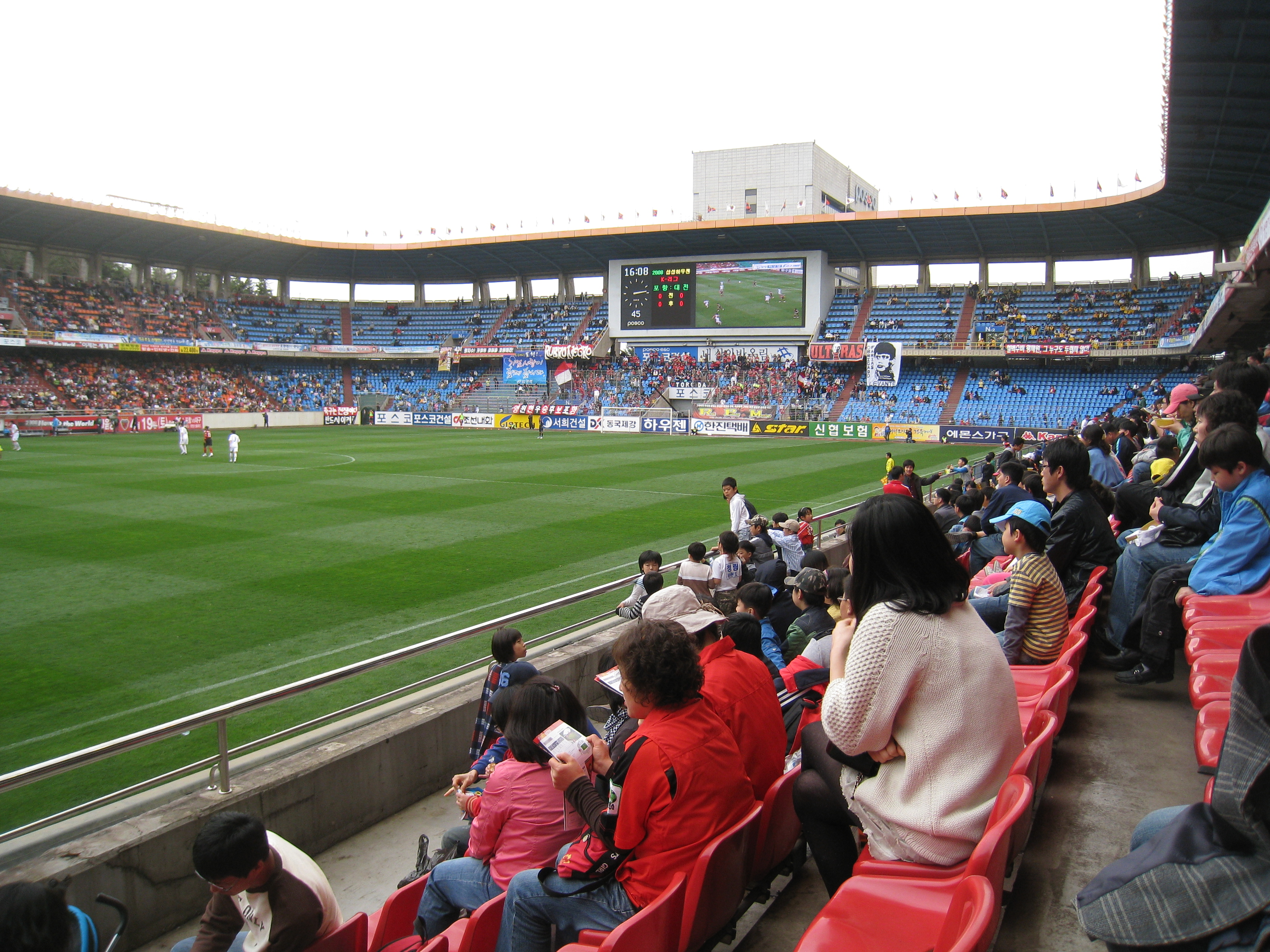
Fans at the Pohang Steel Yard, the first football-specific stadium in South Korea

The Steelers' home is the Pohang Steel Yard, completed in 1990 as South Korea's first football-specific stadium. The stadium opened in November 1990 with a match between Pohang and Korea University. It is located in Pohang's industrial area, close to the POSCO steelworks and next to its head office.

The team trains at the Songna Clubhouse, located in Songna-myeon in Pohang's North District. It was completed in 2001 at the cost of approximately 8 billion won, making the Steelers the first club in the South Korean professional football league to have their own clubhouse. In 2019, the club opened the Steelers Football Performance Center at a cost of 2 billion won to improve players' fitness and prevent injuries.

== Club culture ==
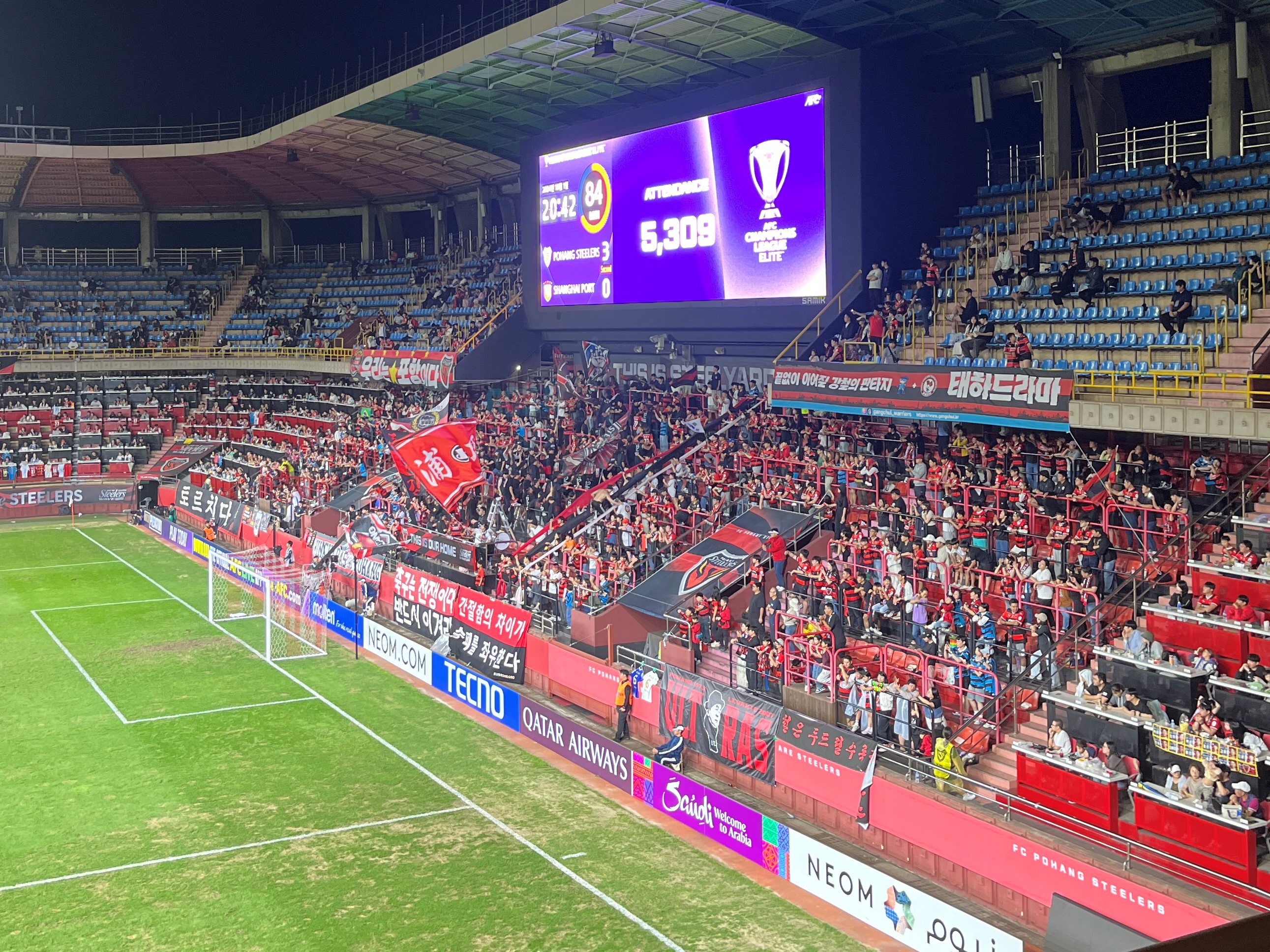
Pohang supporters in the safe standing section at the Steel Yard during an AFC Champions League Elite match in 2024

=== Supporters ===
The Steelers have a number of supporters groups, including Ultras Levante, Steel Warriors, Torcida, and Marines. Members of supporters groups participated in the recording of the official club song "승리를 위하여 달려가자 — We are Steelers" (Let's run for victory — We are Steelers), written to commemorate the Steelers' 50th anniversary in 2023. Steelers fans have friendly relations with the supporters of Suwon Samsung Bluewings in a friendship dubbed the Supo Alliance (수포동맹). Suwon's Frente Tricolor supporters group raised money for the city of Pohang in the aftermath of Typhoon Hinnamnor.

Pohang fans made headlines in 2025 when the supporters group Ultras Levante reposted social media posts uploaded by members featuring remarks considered derogatory toward the Jeolla region, following a league match against Gwangju FC. Ultras Levante issued an apology for the behaviour of its members. Steelers chairman Lee Jong-ha initially dismissed the incident as an innocent mistake, suggesting the fans in question were too young to have intended any offence, causing further anger. Gwangju FC contacted the club directly demanding formal disciplinary action over the incident. Several days after the initial controversy, the Steelers issued an official apology and banned two fans from Pohang's home match against Gwangju later in the season.

=== ROK Marines Corps ===
The Steelers have links with the ROK Marine Corps, the first division of which is based in Pohang. Marines regularly attend matches at the Steelyard and are known for singing and cheering enthusiastically. The club has hosted special matchday events to commemorate Marines Day, and in 2019 released a special kit to celebrate the 70th anniversary of the Marine Corps.

=== Rivalries ===
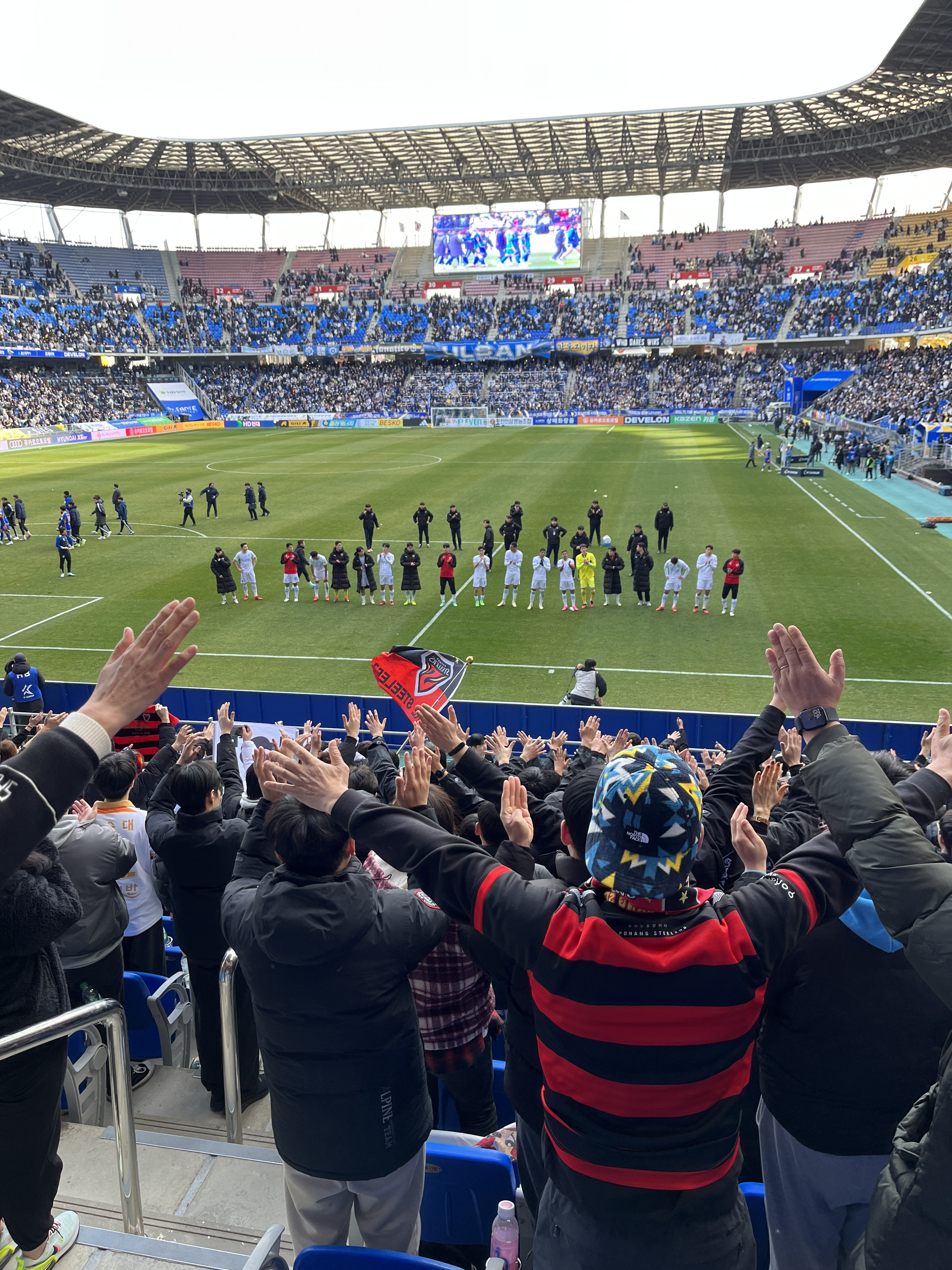
Pohang away supporters at the Ulsan Munsu Football Stadium for the Donghaean Derby

The club's arch-rival is Ulsan HD, in a match dubbed the Donghaean derby. The geographically close cities of Pohang and Ulsan are two of the largest industrial cities in South Korea, with Pohang being home to POSCO, one of the world's largest steelmakers and Ulsan being home to HD Hyundai, the world's largest shipbuilding company. One of the most memorable matches between the two sides was played in the final round of the 2013 K League Classic season. Ulsan were top of the table coming into the final round, and Pohang needed to defeat Ulsan away from home to win the title. Kim Won-il scored the winning goal for Pohang late in injury time for the club's fifth K League title. Pohang also triumphed over Ulsan in the 2024 Korea Cup final to secure their record sixth cup title.

Another rivalry is shared with Jeonnam Dragons, another club owned by POSCO and located in Gwangyang, home to POSCO's largest steelworks that are even larger than the ones in Pohang. The two met in the final of the 2007 Korean FA Cup, with Pohang losing both legs of the tie.

== Kits ==
The club's original kit was orange, representing the colour of hot metal during the steelmaking process. From 1984, red and black were established as the team's colours. Pohang's home kit has usually featured red and black hoops, although the team wore cyan blue at home between 1996 and 1998.

In recent years, the Steelers have released several special kits commemorating the club's history and culture. The 2018 home and away kits were released under the concept 'Back to the Original', featuring elements of designs from years gone by. In 2019, a special kit was released to mark the 70th anniversary of the ROK Marine Corps. The following year, the club unveiled another retro kit design, this time celebrating the 30th anniversary of the Steelers' home ground, the Steelyard. In 2023, the club marked their 50th anniversary with an orange kit, bringing back the signature colour of the original POSCO FC.

=== Kit suppliers ===
Kit supplier	Period	Ref.
Adidas	1984–1987, 1990–1992	
Prospecs	1987–1989, 1993–1995	
Adidas	1996–2001	
Diadora	2002	
Puma	2003–2005	
Kappa	2006–2012	
Atemi	2013–2014	
Hummel	2015–2016	
Astore	2017–2020	
Puma	2021–present	

== Current squad ==
As of 12 October 2026

Note: Flags indicate national team as defined under FIFA eligibility rules; some limited exceptions apply. Players may hold more than one non-FIFA nationality.

No.	Pos.	Nation	Player
1	GK	KOR	Yoon Pyeong-gook
3	DF	KOR	Kim Ye-sung
4	DF	KOR	Jeon Min-gwang (captain)
5	DF	KOR	Jin Si-woo
7	FW	KOR	Won Ki-jong
8	MF	KOR	Kim Seung-ho
9	FW	KOR	An Jae-jun
10	FW	GER	Jakob Tranziska
11	FW	BRA	Juninho Rocha
12	MF	KOR	Hwang Jae-hwan
13	DF	KOR	Kang Min-jun
14	DF	KOR	Lee Chang-woo
16	MF	KOR	Kim Dong-jin
17	DF	KOR	Shin Kwang-hoon
18	FW	KOR	Cho Sang-hyeok
20	DF	KOR	Park Chan-yong (vice-captain)
21	GK	KOR	Hwang In-jae

No.	Pos.	Nation	Player
22	FW	KOR	Kim Kwang-won
25	FW	BRA	Jorge Teixeira
26	MF	KOR	Kim Bum-jun
29	GK	KOR	Hong Seong-min
30	FW	KOR	Kim Yong-hak (on loan from Portimonense)
31	MF	JPN	Kento Nishiya (on loan from Sagan Tosu)
32	DF	KOR	Cho Young-jun
33	DF	KOR	Jo Sung-wook
34	FW	KOR	Baek Seung-won
36	DF	KOR	Kim Ho-jin
37	FW	KOR	Jung Han-min
40	MF	KOR	Ki Sung-yueng
47	MF	KOR	Lee Soo-ah
55	DF	KOR	Yun Dae-geun
70	MF	KOR	Hwang Seo-woong
77	DF	BRA	Wanderson
91	GK	KOR	Kwon Neung

=== Out on loan ===
Note: Flags indicate national team as defined under FIFA eligibility rules; some limited exceptions apply. Players may hold more than one non-FIFA nationality.

No.	Pos.	Nation	Player
—	GK	KOR	Lee Seung-hwan (at Chungbuk Cheongju)
—	DF	KOR	Eo Jeong-won (at Gimcheon Sangmu for military service)
—	DF	KOR	Kim Seo-jin (at Gimcheon Sangmu for military service)
—	DF	KOR	Lee Dong-hyeop (at Cheonan City)

No.	Pos.	Nation	Player
—	FW	KOR	Hong Yun-sang (at Gimcheon Sangmu for military service)
—	FW	KOR	Kim Beom-soo (at Jeonnam Dragons)
—	FW	KOR	Lee Kyu-min (at Cheonan City)
—	FW	KOR	Son Seung-beom (at Hwaseong FC)

== Honours ==
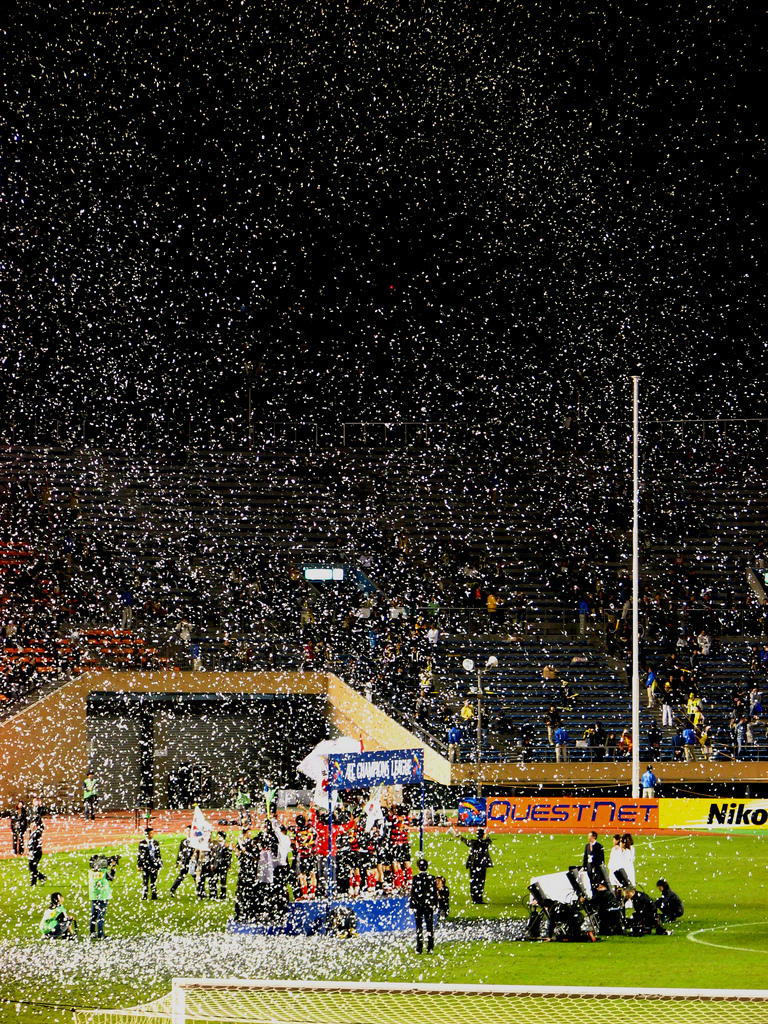
Pohang Steelers celebrating their third AFC Champions League title in 2009.

=== Domestic ===
==== League ====
- K League 1
  - Winners (5): 1986, 1988, 1992, 2007, 2013
  - Runners-up (5): 1985, 1987, 1995, 2004, 2023
- Korean National Semi-Professional Football League
  - Winners (5): 1975 Spring, 1981 Fall, 1982, 1986 Fall, 1988 Fall
  - Runners-up (2): 1977, 1989 Spring

==== Cups ====
- Korean Cup
  - Winners (6): 1996, 2008, 2012, 2013, 2023, 2024
  - Runners-up (3): 2001, 2002, 2007
- Korean League Cup
  - Winners (2): 1993, 2009
  - Runners-up (2): 1996, 1997s
- Korean National Football Championship
  - Runners-up (2): 1977, 1985
- Korean President's Cup
  - Winners (1): 1974
  - Runners-up (1): 1989

=== International ===
==== Continental ====
- AFC Champions League
  - Winners (3): 1996–97, 1997–98, 2009
  - Runners-up (1): 2021
- Asian Super Cup
  - Runners-up (2): 1997, 1998
- A3 Champions Cup
  - Runners-up (1): 2005

==== Worldwide ====
- FIFA Club World Cup
  - Third place (1): 2009
- Afro-Asian Club Championship
  - Runners-up (2): 1997, 1998

==== Invitational ====
- DCM Trophy
  - Winners (1): 1988
  - Runners-up (1): 1989
- King's Cup
  - Runners-up (1): 1987

== Season-by-season records ==
=== Domestic record ===
Season	Division	Tms.	Pos.	Korea Cup
1983	1	5	4	—
1984	1	8	5	—
1985	1	8	2	—
1986	1	6	1	—
1987	1	5	2	—
1988	1	5	1	—
1989	1	6	4	—
1990	1	6	3	—
1991	1	6	3	—
1992	1	6	1	—
1993	1	6	4	—
1994	1	7	3	—
1995	1	8	2	—
1996	1	9	3	Winners
1997	1	10	4	Semi-final
1998	1	10	3	Semi-final
1999	1	10	5	Round of 16
2000	1	10	9	Quarter-final
2001	1	10	5	Runners-up
2002	1	10	6	Runners-up
2003	1	12	7	Quarter-final
2004	1	13	2	Round of 32
2005	1	13	5	Quarter-final
2006	1	14	3	Round of 16
2007	1	14	1	Runners-up
2008	1	14	5	Winners
2009	1	15	3	Quarter-final
2010	1	15	9	Round of 16
2011	1	16	3	Semi-final
2012	1	16	3	Winners
2013	1	14	1	Winners
2014	1	12	4	Round of 16
2015	1	12	3	Quarter-final
2016	1	12	9	Round of 32
2017	1	12	7	Round of 32
2018	1	12	4	Round of 32
2019	1	12	4	Round of 32
2020	1	12	3	Semi-final
2021	1	12	9	Quarter-final
2022	1	12	3	Quarter-final
2023	1	12	2	Winners
2024	1	12	6	Winners
2025	1	12	4	Round of 16

=== Continental record ===
All results list Pohang's goal tally first.

==== AFC Champions League ====
Season	Round	Opposition	Home	Away	Agg.
2008	Group E	(Australia) Adelaide United	0–2	0–1	3rd
2008	Group E	(Vietnam) Becamex Binh Duong	0–0	4–1	3rd
2008	Group E	(China) Changchun Yatai	2–2	0–1	3rd
2009	Group H	(Australia) Central Coast Mariners	3–2	0–0	1st
2009	Group H	(Japan) Kawasaki Frontale	1–1	2–0	1st
2009	Group H	(China) Tianjin TEDA	1–0	0–0	1st
2009	Round of 16	(Australia) Newcastle Jets	6–0	—N/a	—N/a
2009	Quarter-final	(Uzbekistan) Bunyodkor	4–1 (a.e.t.)	1–3	5–4
2009	Semi-final	(Qatar) Umm-Salal	2–0	2–1	4–1
2009	Final	(Saudi Arabia) Al-Ittihad	2–1 (Note: Played at a neutral venue.)		—N/a
2010	Group H	(Australia) Adelaide United	0–0	0–1	2nd
2010	Group H	(Japan) Sanfrecce Hiroshima	2–1	3–4	2nd
2010	Group H	(China) Shandong Luneng	1–0	2–1	2nd
2010	Round of 16	(Japan) Kashima Antlers	—N/a	1–0	—N/a
2010	Quarter-final	(Iran) Zob Ahan	1–1	1–2	2–3
2012	Play-off	(Thailand) Chonburi	2–0	—N/a	—N/a
2012	Group E	(Japan) Gamba Osaka	2–0	3–0	3rd
2012	Group E	(Uzbekistan) Bunyodkor	0–2	0–1	3rd
2012	Group E	(Australia) Adelaide United	1–0	0–1	3rd
2013	Group G	(China) Beijing Guoan	0–0	0–2	3rd
2013	Group G	(Uzbekistan) Bunyodkor	1–1	2–2	3rd
2013	Group G	(Japan) Sanfrecce Hiroshima	1–1	1–0	3rd
2014	Group E	(Japan) Cerezo Osaka	1–1	2–0	1st
2014	Group E	(Thailand) Buriram United	0–0	2–1	1st
2014	Group E	(China) Shandong Luneng	2–2	4–2	1st
2014	Round of 16	(South Korea) Jeonbuk Hyundai Motors	1–0	2–1	3–1
2014	Quarter-final	(South Korea) FC Seoul	0–0	0–0 (a.e.t.)	0–0 (0–3 p)
2016	Play-off	(Vietnam) Hanoi FC	3–0	—N/a	—N/a
2016	Group H	(China) Guangzhou Evergrande	0–2	0–0	4th
2016	Group H	(Japan) Urawa Red Diamonds	1–0	1–1	4th
2016	Group H	(Australia) Sydney FC	0–1	0–1	4th
2021	Group G	(Thailand) Ratchaburi Mitr Phol	2–0	0–0	2nd
2021	Group G	(Japan) Nagoya Grampus	1–1	0–3	2nd
2021	Group G	(Malaysia) Johor Darul Ta'zim	4–1	2–0	2nd
2021	Round of 16	(Japan) Cerezo Osaka	—N/a	1–0	—N/a
2021	Quarter-final	(Japan) Nagoya Grampus	3–0		—N/a
2021	Semi-final	(South Korea) Ulsan Hyundai	1–1 (a.e.t.) (5–4 p)		—N/a
2021	Final	(Saudi Arabia) Al-Hilal	—N/a	0–2	—N/a
2023–24	Group J	(Vietnam) Hanoi FC	2–0	4–2	1st
2023–24	Group J	(China) Wuhan Three Towns	3–1	1–1	1st
2023–24	Group J	(Japan) Urawa Red Diamonds	2–1	2–0	1st
2023–24	Round of 16	(South Korea) Jeonbuk Hyundai Motors	1–1	0–2	1–3

==== AFC Champions League Elite ====
Season	Round	Opposition	Home	Away	Agg.
2024–25	League stage	(China) Shanghai Shenhua	—N/a	1–4	9th out of 12 (eliminated)
2024–25	League stage	(China) Shanghai Port	3–0	—N/a	9th out of 12 (eliminated)
2024–25	League stage	(Thailand) Buriram United	—N/a	0–1	9th out of 12 (eliminated)
2024–25	League stage	(China) Shandong Taishan	4–2 (voided)	—N/a	9th out of 12 (eliminated)
2024–25	League stage	(Japan) Yokohama F. Marinos	—N/a	0–2	9th out of 12 (eliminated)
2024–25	League stage	(Japan) Vissel Kobe	3–1	—N/a	9th out of 12 (eliminated)
2024–25	League stage	(Japan) Kawasaki Frontale	0–4	—N/a	9th out of 12 (eliminated)
2024–25	League stage	(Malaysia) Johor Darul Ta'zim	—N/a	2–5	9th out of 12 (eliminated)
2026–27	League stage	(China) Beijing Guoan	—N/a	1–3	
2026–27	League stage	(Malaysia) Johor Darul Ta'zim	0–2	—N/a	
2026–27	League stage	(Japan) Kashima Antlers	—N/a	0–3	
2026–27	League stage	(Japan) Gamba Osaka	3–3	—N/a	
2026–27	League stage	(Japan) Kyoto Sanga	—N/a		
2026–27	League stage	(China) Shanghai Port		—N/a	
2026–27	League stage	(Japan) Vissel Kobe	—N/a		
2026–27	League stage	(Japan) Kashiwa Reysol		—N/a	

==== AFC Champions League Two ====
Season	Round	Opposition	Home	Away	Agg.
2025–26	Group H	(Thailand) BG Pathum United	2–0	1–0	2nd
2025–26	Group H	(Philippines) Kaya–Iloilo	2–0	1–0	2nd
2025–26	Group H	(Singapore) Tampines Rovers	1–1	0–1	2nd
2025–26	Round of 16	(Japan) Gamba Osaka	1–1	1–2	2–3

== Managers ==
No.	Manager	Period	Honours
1	(South Korea) Han Hong-ki	2 May 1973 – 29 November 1984	
2	(South Korea) Choi Eun-taek	29 November 1984 – 16 December 1986	1986 K League
3	(South Korea) Lee Hoe-taik	16 December 1986 – 31 December 1992	1988 K League, 1992 K League
C	(South Korea) Kim Soon-ki (South Korea) Kim Chul-soo	1989	
C	(South Korea) Cho Yoon-ok	1989–1990	
4	(South Korea) Huh Jung-moo	1993 – 25 November 1995	1993 League Cup
C	(South Korea) Kim Soon-ki	1994	
5	(South Korea) Park Sung-hwa	12 December 1995 – 31 July 2000	1996 FA Cup, 1996–97 Asian Club Championship, 1997–98 Asian Club Championship
6	(South Korea) Choi Soon-ho	1 August 2000 – 5 December 2004	
7	(Brazil) Sérgio Farias	6 January 2005 – 20 December 2009	2007 K League, 2008 FA Cup, 2009 League Cup, 2009 AFC Champions League
8	(Brazil) Waldemar Lemos	8 January – 10 May 2010	
C	(South Korea) Park Chang-hyun	11 May – 7 November 2010	
9	(South Korea) Hwang Sun-hong	13 December 2010 – 29 November 2015	2012 FA Cup, 2013 FA Cup, 2013 K League
10	(South Korea) Choi Jin-cheul	28 December 2015 – 24 September 2016	
11	(South Korea) Choi Soon-ho	26 September 2016 – 22 April 2019	
12	(South Korea) Kim Gi-dong	23 April 2019 – 14 December 2023	2023 FA Cup
13	(South Korea) Park Tae-ha	15 December 2023 – 30 October 2026	2024 FA Cup
C	(South Korea) Kim Seong-jae	30 October 2026 – present	

- Names in italics indicates interim or caretaker manager

== See also ==
- List of football clubs in South Korea
