= Ki Sung-yueng =

South Korean footballer (born 1989)

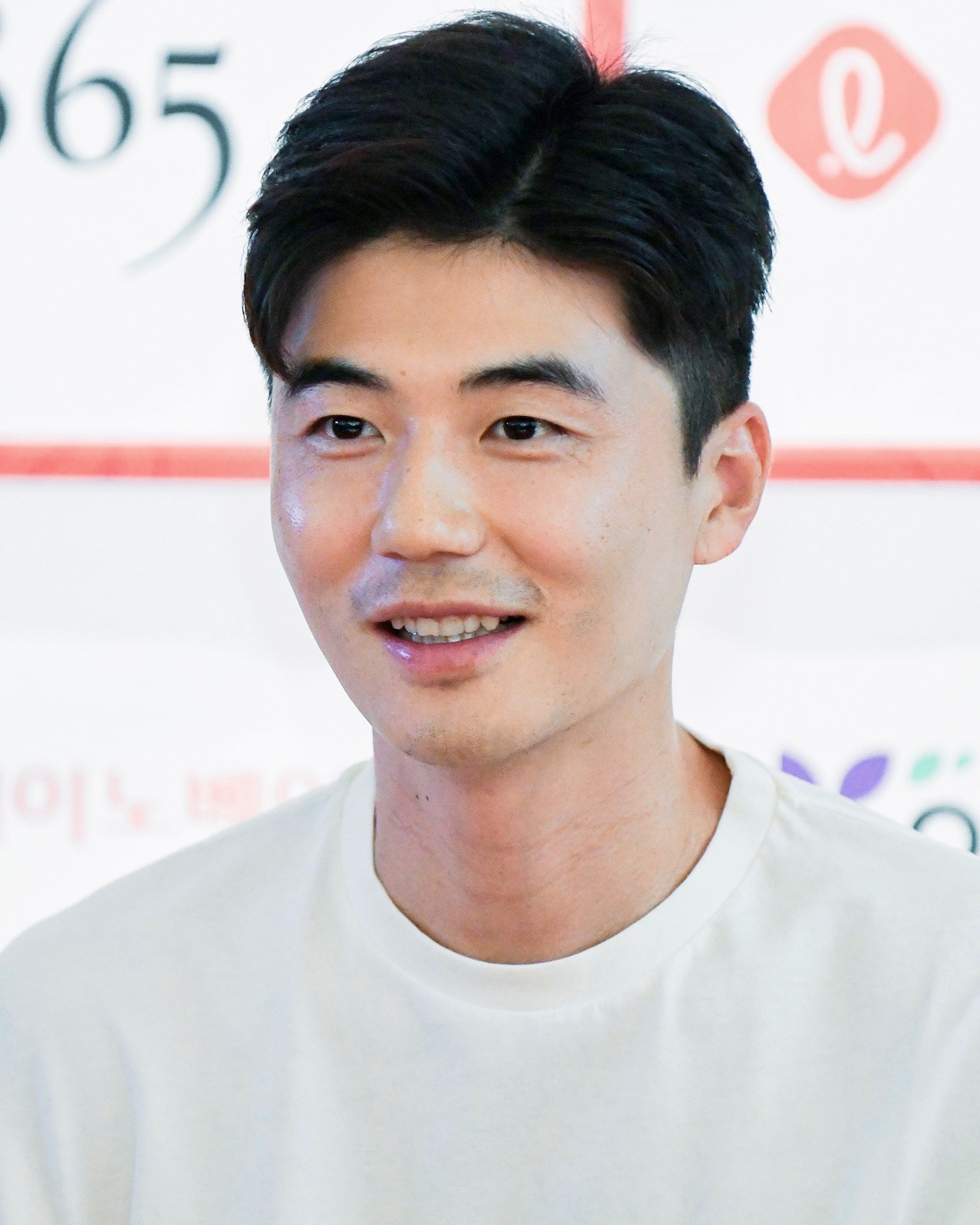
- Ki in 2024

Personal information
- Full name: Ki Sung-yueng
- Date of birth: 24 January 1989 (age 37)
- Place of birth: Gwangju, South Korea
- Height: 1.89 m (6 ft 2 in)
- Position: Midfielder

Team information
- Current team: Pohang Steelers
- Number: 40

Youth career
- 2001–2005: John Paul College
- 2005: Kumho High School

Senior career*
Years	Team	Apps	(Gls)
2006–2009	FC Seoul	60	(7)
2010–2012	Celtic	66	(9)
2012–2018	Swansea City	139	(12)
2013–2014	→ Sunderland (loan)	27	(3)
2018–2020	Newcastle United	21	(0)
2020	Mallorca	1	(0)
2020–2025	FC Seoul	138	(7)
2025–	Pohang Steelers	34	(0)

International career
2004	South Korea U17	6	(3)
2006–2007	South Korea U20	16	(2)
2007–2012	South Korea U23	22	(1)
2008–2019	South Korea	110	(10)
Medal record
Representing South Korea
Men's football
Olympic Games
Bronze medal – third place	2012 London
AFC Asian Cup
Runner-up	2015 Australia
Bronze medal – third place	2011 Qatar
AFC Youth Championship
Bronze medal – third place	2006 India
- * Club domestic league appearances and goals as of 3 August 2026

- Ki Sung-yueng
- Hangul: 기성용
- Hanja: 奇誠庸
- RR: Gi Seongyong
- MR: Ki Sŏngyong

Ki Sung-yueng (Korean: 기성용; Hanja: 奇誠庸; Korean pronunciation: [ki.sʌŋ.joŋ]; born 24 January 1989) is a South Korean professional footballer who plays as a midfielder for K League 1 club Pohang Steelers.

From 2008 to 2019, Ki was a full international for South Korea, gaining 110 caps. He was selected in their squads for three World Cups, leading them as captain in the 2018 edition in Russia, and participated in three Asian Cups, finishing as runner-up in the 2015 edition. He has also played at two Olympic Games with his country, winning bronze in 2012.

On 20 May 2015, Ki was voted Swansea City's Player of the Year as he scored eight goals in 33 appearances, with whom he also won the EFL Cup in 2013. He has also won the Scottish Premier League and the Scottish Cup with Celtic.

== Early life ==
Ki started his football career at Suncheon Jungang Elementary School Football Club, and later joined Gwangyang Jecheol Middle School. In 2001, he went to Brisbane, Australia, to study at John Paul College under the BSP (Brain Soccer Program) overseen by Jeff Hopkins. His father saw the move as an opportunity for Ki to combine his athletic and academic pursuits as well as to learn English. Ki played his youth football for the school team and was part of the team that won the 2004 Bill Turner Cup, the national inter-school under-15 soccer competition. In 2005, he received offers from South Korean club FC Seoul and A-League club Queensland Roar, but decided to move back to South Korea to continue his education and career. After moving back to South Korea, Ki attended Kumho High School where he graduated in 2006.

== Club career ==
=== FC Seoul ===
Ki returned to South Korea and joined FC Seoul, where he played alongside national teammate Lee Chung-yong. He was an unused substitute in the last match of the 2006 League Cup. Under Şenol Güneş, he made his senior debut in the K League on 4 March 2007, in a match against Daegu FC.

During the 2008 season, Ki reinforced his position as a key player of FC Seoul. On 29 October 2008, Ki scored the winning goal against Seoul's biggest rivals Suwon Samsung Bluewings in the 92nd minute. Ki performed a "Kangaroo Ceremony", which he claims to be an imitation of Emmanuel Adebayor's ceremony, but Suwon fans have argued that this was imitation of 'chicken', which is what many Seoul fans call Suwon. He led the team to an unprecedented K League runners-up position with four goals and one assist in 21 appearances.

In FC Seoul's first K League match of the 2009 season, Ki scored one goal in the 6–1 defeat of Chunnam Dragons. There was increasing speculation regarding a high-profile move abroad, with suitors including PSV, Hamburger SV and Porto, among others.

=== Celtic ===
On 25 August 2009, it was revealed that contact between Celtic and FC Seoul had occurred regarding the possibility of Ki's transfer to the Parkhead club. However, the player's agent stated an immediate move would be unlikely given Seoul's success in the league and the Asian Champions League. Yet, three days later, Celtic clinched a £2.1 million transfer for Ki. He linked up with the Parkhead side in the January transfer window at the end of the K-League season. The signing was confirmed on 13 December 2009 after Ki passed a medical and secured a work permit. Ki reportedly turned down an offer from English club Portsmouth, then of the Premier League. He took the number 18 with "Ki" on his shirt. He made his debut for Celtic in a 1–1 draw against Falkirk at Celtic Park on 16 January 2010, winning the Man of the Match award from the official Celtic website. He played a further four matches for Celtic that season, but struggled to make much impact in what was a period of upheaval for the club.

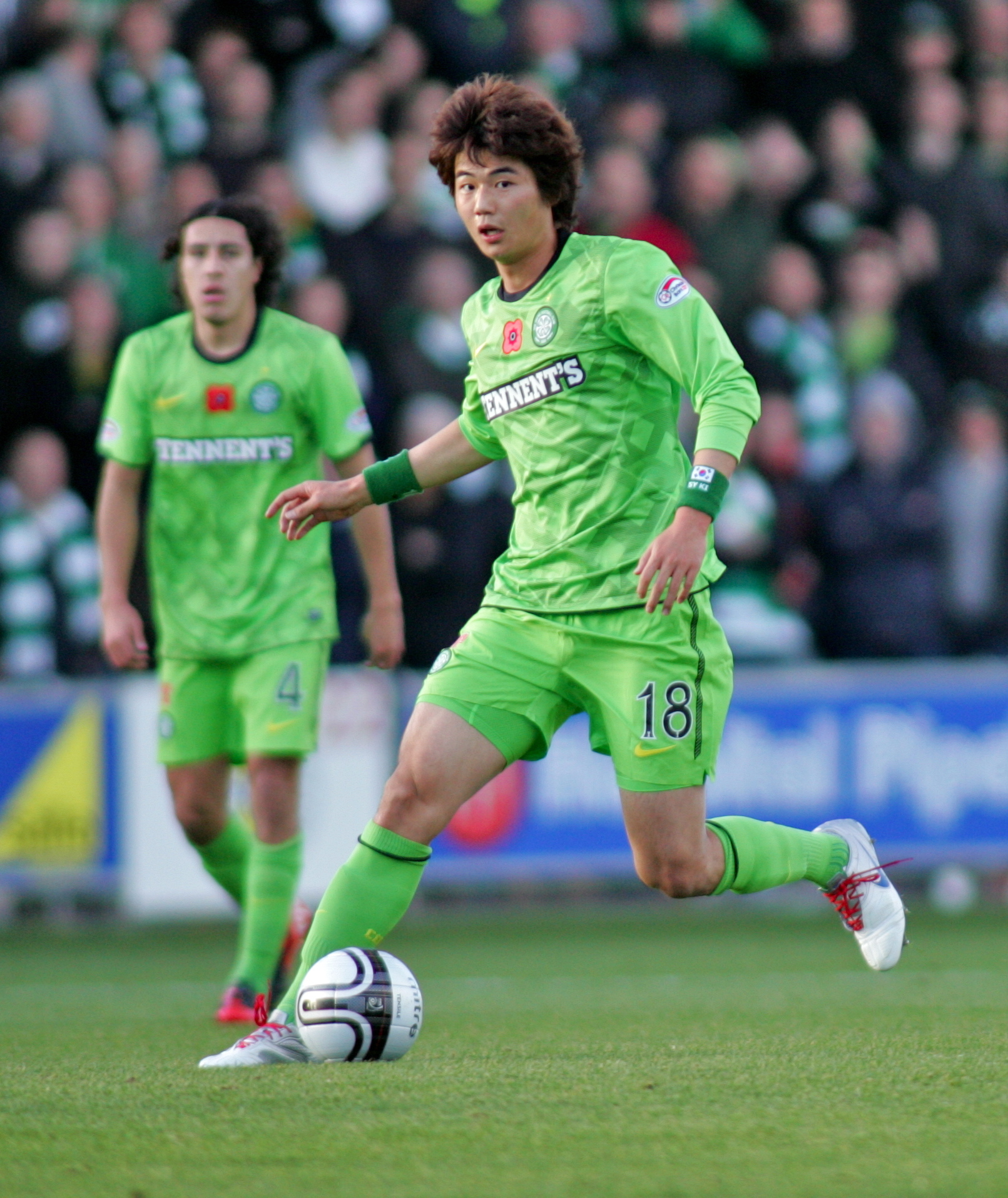
Ki playing for Celtic in 2010

Ki barely played for Celtic in the first month of season 2010–11, but came off the bench to score his first competitive goal for Celtic on 22 August 2010 with a shot from 25 yards in a 4–0 victory against St Mirren in the Scottish Premier League (SPL). By the end of October he had become a first team regular and was voted the SPL Young Player of the Month for October 2010. However, on 30 October 2010, Ki found himself the recipient of apparent racist abuse during a league match away at St Johnstone. A section of the St Johnstone support were heard making barking noises – "woofing" – at Ki as he took a corner kick. Chants of "Who ate all the dogs?" were also heard from the home fans throughout the match.

Ki scored his second goal of the season in a 2–2 draw with Inverness Thistle at Celtic Park. On 26 December 2010, Ki scored against St Johnstone in a 2–0 victory in the SPL, in what was his last match for Celtic before travelling to Qatar to play for South Korea in the 2011 AFC Asian Cup in January. On returning to Scotland in February, Ki returned to the Celtic first team for the 2–2 draw against Rangers in a Scottish Cup tie at Ibrox Stadium. Celtic played a significant part of the match with only ten men after goalkeeper Fraser Forster was sent off, but the midfield – including Ki – won praise for the manner in which they dominated the match in the second half. Ki also played in the replay at Celtic Park, an ill-tempered match which Celtic won 1–0. On 21 May 2011, Ki scored the first goal of Celtic's Scottish Cup Final win against Motherwell with a left-footed strike from around 35 yards. He also won the official Man of the Match award.

Ki started the 2011–12 campaign in Celtic's opening match against Hibernian in the SPL. Scoring the second goal in a 2–0 victory, a 25-yard left foot strike into the right hand bottom corner and also won the Man of the Match award from the official Celtic website. He impressed Celtic manager Neil Lennon so much in the Hibernian match that he said:

He's a very important player to us. I rate him very highly. He can go on to be anything he wants to be. We think he is a class player and we're glad he's here. Ki has been very consistent over the past 18 months. He's developing nicely into a class player. He had good presence and good composure on the ball. He has a goal or two in him and his passing range is excellent.

Ki then went on to score another goal on 13 August 2011 in the SPL in a 5–1 win over Dundee United at Celtic Park, a strike into the top left-hand corner from the edge of the box. A couple of days later, it was reported that Premier League sides Blackburn Rovers, Tottenham Hotspur and several clubs from the Russian Premier League were interested in signing Ki. The next day, Celtic issued a "hands-off warning" to the interested clubs, saying it would take a bid of significant proportions for Celtic to allow the increasingly important midfielder to leave the club. On 10 September 2011, Ki again impressed against Motherwell, this time in the SPL with a superb strike from outside the box with his right foot. Celtic went on to win the match 4–0. On 29 September, he started in Celtic's 1–1 draw with Italian side Udinese, scoring from a penalty after three minutes. On 18 December 2011, he scored the second goal of the match as Celtic defeated St Johnstone 2–0 at McDiarmid Park in the SPL. Over the course of the 2011–12 campaign, Ki scored seven goals and had six assists, playing a key role in helping Celtic win the Scottish title.

=== Swansea City ===
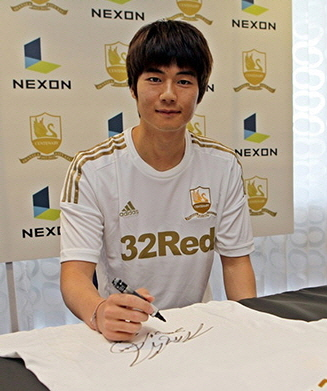
Ki as a Swansea City player

On 24 August 2012, Ki transferred to Swansea City for around £6 million on a three-year contract, which was Swansea's record transfer fee until it was later broken by Wilfried Bony. Ki made his debut for the Swans in a 3–1 victory against Barnsley in the second round of the League Cup at Liberty Stadium on 28 August. Wearing the number 24 shirt, Ki started as a central midfielder and was substituted off in the 76th minute.

Ki enjoyed a promising debut season in the Premier League. Although he failed to replicate the scoring form he displayed at Celtic, his passing style drew praise from supporters and critics, and he finished the season with 38 appearances in all competitions. On 24 February 2013, Swansea City competed in the final of the League Cup. Ki played for over an hour in the final in an unfamiliar central defensive role. The tactical switch proved to be a success, as Swansea ran out comfortable 5–0 winners against Bradford City as Ki won his first trophy with the Welsh club.

==== Loan to Sunderland ====
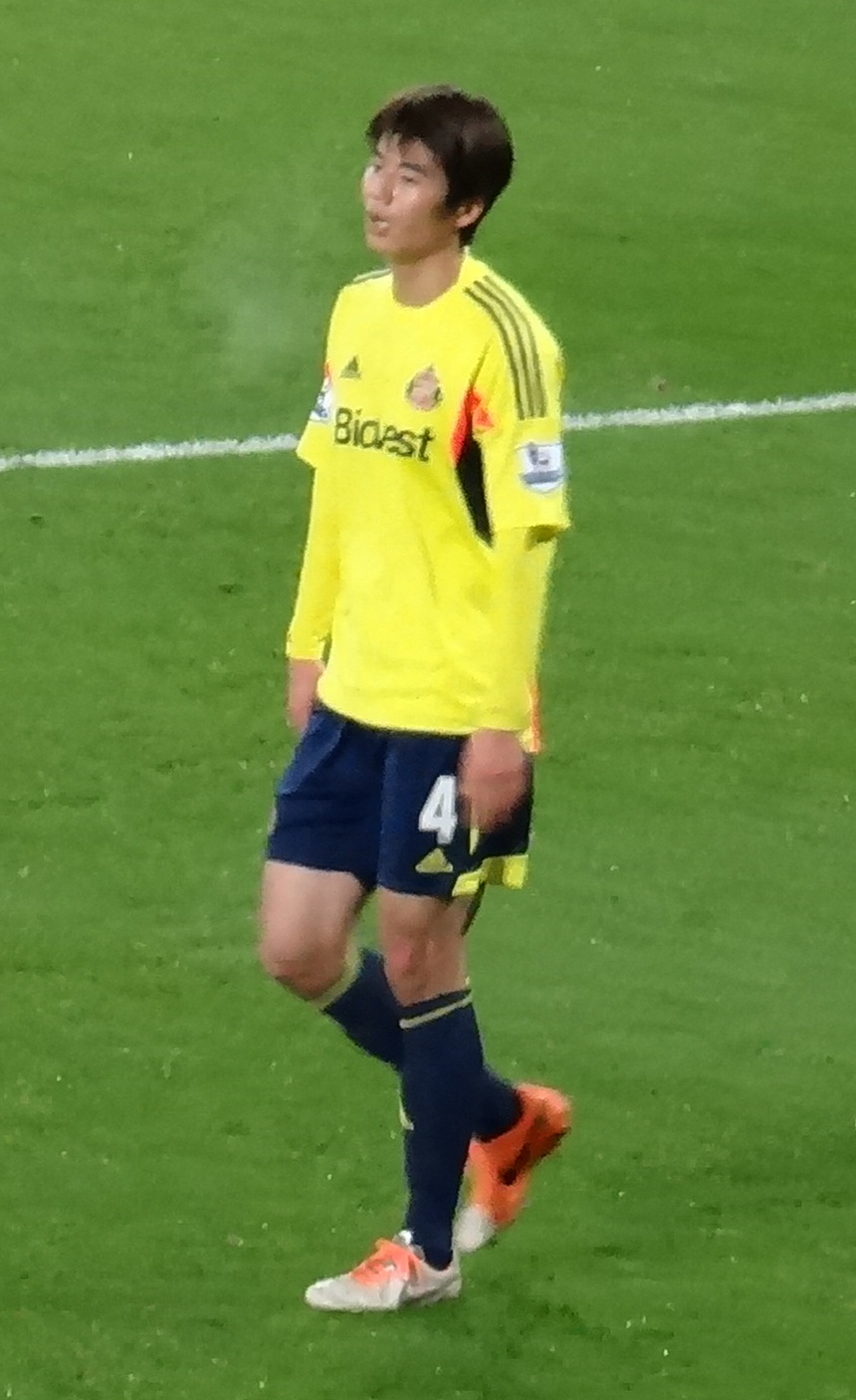
Ki in action for Sunderland in December 2013

On 31 August 2013, Ki joined Sunderland on a season-long loan with a mid-season re-call option. He scored his first goal for Sunderland on 17 December 2013 in a 2–1 League Cup quarter-final win over Chelsea, cutting inside Ashley Cole then beating goalkeeper Mark Schwarzer with a low shot in the 119th minute for the winning goal. On 26 December, he scored his second for Sunderland in a 1–0 away win over Everton. Everton goalkeeper Tim Howard played a short pass to Leon Osman who was robbed of the ball by Ki. Howard brought Ki down and was sent off, and Ki converted the penalty kick himself to give the Black Cats a vital win. It was Ki's first league goal. Ki's third goal for Sunderland came in a 4–1 away win at Fulham from a well-worked set piece by Adam Johnson.

On 22 January 2014, Ki reached his second consecutive League Cup final as he helped Sunderland defeat Manchester United 2–1 on penalty kicks after the two-legged semi-final had finished level on aggregate, with Ki and Marcos Alonso scoring Sunderland's penalties. Ki played against Manchester City in the League Cup final on 2 March, but despite leading 1–0 at half-time, they were overpowered by City in the second half, eventually losing 3–1.

Sunderland spent most of the Premier League season in the relegation zone, but Ki played his part in their recovery, even playing on despite suffering tendonitis in his knee for several months. He played his last match for Sunderland on 10 April 2014. Sunderland succeeded in avoiding relegation, and eventually finished 14th.

==== Return to Swansea ====
Ki returned to Swansea for the start of the 2014–15 Premier League season, stating, "This is my third season in the Premier League, and I want to grow as a player and improve to help the team." He scored the first goal of the season in a 2–1 win over Manchester United at Old Trafford on 16 August 2014. On 28 August, he signed a new contract to last until 2018. Ki became a regular in the team under new manager Garry Monk, and by the end of December, had started in every Premier League fixture. Ki did not play for Swansea during January 2015 as he was away on international duty with South Korea at the Asian Cup. On his return in February 2015, he went straight back in to the team and scored the equalising goal in a 1–1 draw with Sunderland. Swansea lost their next match 2–0 against West Bromwich Albion, but ten days later, the team recorded their second win of the season over Manchester United with Ki scoring their equalising goal in a 2–1 win.

Ki played 28 times during the 2015–16 Premier League season, scoring twice. His first of the season on Boxing Day against West Bromwich Albion in an eventual 1–0 win, and the second on 8 May 2016 against West Ham United. He made three less appearances in the 2016–17 Premier League where, which the club struggled in for the majority of the season, Swansea narrowly avoided relegation, but the player did not score in that campaign. In the 2017–18 Premier League season, it was another struggle for the club. Ki scored twice in two home fixtures within a month, the first against Burnley on 18 February 2018 and the second against West Ham. After that, it looked like the club was comfortable in mid-table, however with not much impact in the attacking point of view, the club struggled and Ki could not prevent them from Premier League relegation which was confirmed on the final day. After the relegation, Ki announced his departure shortly after the season finished.

=== Newcastle United ===
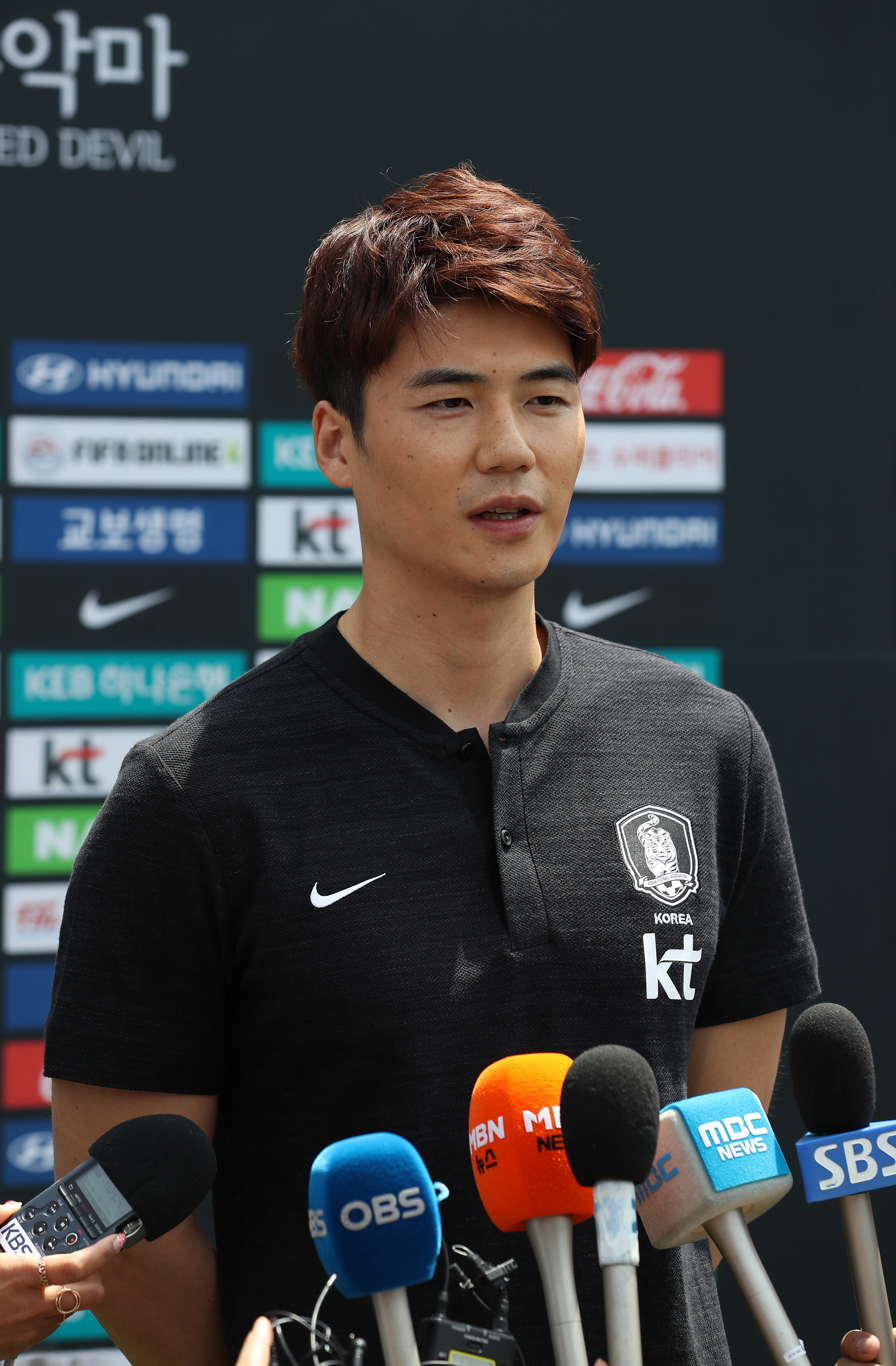
Ki with South Korea at the 2018 FIFA World Cup

On 29 June 2018, Ki signed a two-year deal with Newcastle United after the expiration of his Swansea City contract, thus reuniting with former midfield partner Jonjo Shelvey. Manager Rafa Benitez gave Ki his first start for Newcastle on 26 August against Chelsea and the following weekend against Manchester City, both resulting in 2–1 defeats. Benitez would then not select Ki for the next five games, invoking the player's "lack of mobility". He came on as a substitute to replace the injured Shelvey against Watford on 3 November and provided the game winning assist as his free kick was headed in by Ayoze Pérez to secure a 1–0 victory for Newcastle, their first league win of the season. From then on, he was part of Newcastle's march out of the relegation zone, jumping from bottom of the table to 15th by Christmas. His good form was halted as the South Korean had to join his national team to take part in the AFC Asian Cup in the UAE. After coming back to his club in the end of January 2019 with an achilles injury sustained in a match against the Philippines, Ki announced he would retire from his international duties to fully focus on his club career. During his absence, local youngster Sean Longstaff impressed and took over the starting spot in midfield alongside Isaac Hayden. Ki's game time became sporadic, the South Korean starting six out of the eleven remaining league games, and completing 90 minutes only twice.

Despite Newcastle securing safety in the Premier League, manager Rafa Benitez refused to extend his contract and was replaced by Steve Bruce. Under Bruce, Ki was given very little opportunities, making only three league appearances in the 2019–20 season, two of which coming off the bench. Up until January, Ki would rarely feature on the team sheet, moreover illness and a knock sustained in training in December furthered hindered his chances to play. His final appearance for Newcastle, an FA Cup game against Rochdale on 4 January 2020, ended in a 1–1 draw. Bruce and Newcastle allowed Ki to ponder his options in search of more game time during the winter transfer window, and on 31 January 2020, he left the club by mutual consent.

=== Mallorca ===
On 25 February 2020, Ki joined RCD Mallorca for the remaining of the season, with the Balearic club engaged in a relegation battle from the Spanish top tier. He made his La Liga debut on 7 March, replacing Takefusa Kubo in the last fifteen minutes of a vital 2–1 away win against Eibar, thus becoming the first Korean player to wear the shirt of Los Bermellones. His spell in Spain, however, was put to an abrupt end after the emergence of the COVID-19 pandemic, with La Liga being put on hold for three months, and as the league resumed in early June, Ki was unable to train with his team-mates having sustained an ankle injury. He left Mallorca five days before the expiring of his contract, having made only one appearance.

=== Return to FC Seoul ===
After spending eleven years in Europe, Ki agreed to return to FC Seoul and signed a contract until 2023 on 21 July 2020. It was reported that Ki and Seoul had already held talks in January that year about a possible come back to South Korea after the midfielder terminated his contract with Newcastle, but negotiations fell off as Ki accused Seoul of negotiating in bad faith. At the time of his signing, the club was sitting in eleventh place out of twelve teams halfway through the 2020 K League season.

He made his return for the club on 30 August 2020, coming on as a substitute in a 3–0 away defeat to league leaders Ulsan Hyundai. Caretaker manager Kim Ho-young would then give Ki time to regain fitness by bringing him off the bench the three following games, and his impact on the team was quickly praised for providing more stability in FC Seoul's midfield. However, on 16 September, Ki suffered another setback in a 1–0 loss against Incheon United, sustaining a hamstring injury.

After FC Seoul ultimately managed to remain in the division, Ki was promoted captain of his club for the 2021 season. He started the new campaign in impressive fashion, greatly contributing in FC Seoul's four wins in the opening six games. He scored decisive goals in three consecutive games which Seoul won by a single-goal margin, including a last-minute winner against Incheon United on 13 March. On 12 April, he was voted the EA Sports Player of the Month for these performances.

== International career ==
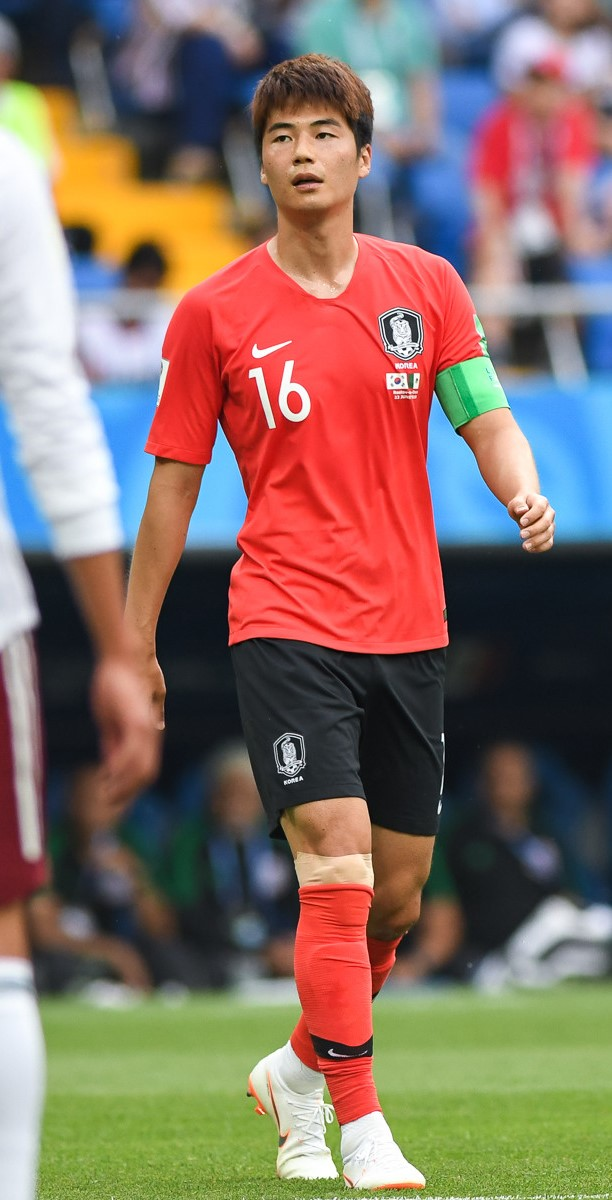
Ki playing for South Korea at the 2018 FIFA World Cup

On the international stage, Ki has played in the 2007 U-20 World Cup and for the South Korea national team as well as the South Korea under-23 team.

On 7 June 2008, he made his international debut in a 2010 FIFA World Cup qualification match against Jordan.

On 1 June 2010, Ki was picked in the 23-man South Korea squad for the 2010 World Cup finals. On 12 June, Ki played in South Korea's first match of the World Cup, against Greece. Ki played a part in all three group matches and assisted twice in two different matches against Greece and Nigeria which helped him and his country get through to the knockout stages of the competition. On 20 December 2011, Ki (along with Ji So-yun of Kobe INAC Japan) was awarded the South Korean Player of the Year award. The decision was announced by the Korean Football Association (KFA) based on his international and club performance in the SPL.

In the 2012 Summer Olympics, Ki scored the fifth and vital penalty for South Korea in their quarter-final match against Great Britain, allowing South Korea to progress to the semi-finals. South Korea lost 3–0 to Brazil in the semi-final, but defeated Japan 2–0 in the third-place play-off to win the bronze medal.

Ki was selected for the South Korea squad for the 2014 World Cup in Brazil. He played in all three matches as Korea were eliminated at the group stage after one draw and two defeats. Following the World Cup, Ki was made captain of the national team by new coach Uli Stielike.

Ki also played for South Korea in the 2015 Asian Cup during January, helping his country reach the final against hosts Australia. He provided the assist for Son Heung-min to tie the final at 1–1 and force extra time, but the Australians scored again during the extra 30 minutes to win 2–1.

Ki captained for South Korea in the 2018 World Cup and played the first two matches before missing the last group stage match against Germany due to a left calf injury suffered against Mexico. Son Heung-min took the captain's armband in Ki's place.

Ki retired from international duties after his country's game against Philippines in the 2019 Asian Cup. South Korea won the match 1–0, though Ki was substituted after suffering a hamstring injury mid-game.

== Personal life ==
=== Family and marriage ===
His father, Ki Young-ok, was general manager of Gwangju FC between 2015 and 2019. He resigned from his position in December 2019, citing "deteriorating health" after four years at the club without receiving any salary. The club, who faced financial difficulties, managed to climb to the country's top tier under his tenure but failed to establish itself in the K League.

Ki confirmed in March 2013 that he was dating actress Han Hye-jin, and announced their engagement in May 2013. The couple filed their marriage registration on 25 June 2013, and wed on 1 July at the Intercontinental Hotel Seoul. Both are devout Christians. They have a daughter, born on 13 September 2015.

=== Controversies ===
On 25 January 2011, during the 2011 AFC Asian Cup semi-final match between Japan and South Korea, Ki scored the opening goal through a penalty kick. Ki created a controversy by celebrating his goal by scratching his cheek in front of a pitch-side camera in an allegedly racist slur at Japanese people, though Ki stated that it was actually directed at fans in Scotland whom he alleged had racially abused him and another Korean player. Asian Cup tournament director Tokuaki Suzuki said no action would be taken on part of the AFC and that FIFA has not contacted the AFC regarding the matter.

In the summer of 2013, it was widely reported Ki had previously insulted then-South Korea national team manager Choi Kang-hee on his Facebook page before and after the match against Kuwait in February 2012. Ki wrote, "Now everyone should have realised the value of the players who play overseas. [He] should have left us alone, otherwise, [he] will be hurt." Ki later apologised for his "mischievous and inappropriate remarks" and his father visited the KFA to apologise as well.

On 24 February 2021, Ki was accused of sexual and physical assault by two former elementary school teammates. Those allegations emerged in a context of accusations of bullying against professional basketball and volleyball players in South Korea, including twin sisters Lee Da-yeong and Lee Jae-yeong who were suspended indefinitely by their teams, and Park Sang-ha who announced his retirement soon after. Although the press release detailing the accusations did not name Ki as a perpetrator, it described a "star player who recently joined a club in the greater Seoul area", and the acts took place while in sixth grade of elementary school at South Jeolla Province in the year 2000. Ki, along with another player, allegedly forced the victims to perform sexual acts on them between January and June 2000. Ki, first via his agency C2 Global and then on social media, categorically denied the accusations stating "he had no connection whatsoever" to the case and threatened to take legal action.

== Career statistics ==
=== Club ===
As of match played 30 November 2025

Appearances and goals by club, season and competition
Club	Season	League			National cup (Note: Includes Korean FA Cup, Scottish Cup, FA Cup)		League cup (Note: Includes Korean League Cup, Scottish League Cup, EFL Cup)		Continental		Other		Total	
Club	Season	Division	Apps	Goals	Apps	Goals	Apps	Goals	Apps	Goals	Apps	Goals	Apps	Goals
FC Seoul	2006	K League	0	0	0	0	0	0	—		—		0	0
FC Seoul	2007	K League	16	0	3	0	6	0	—		—		25	0
FC Seoul	2008	K League	18	4	1	0	6	0	—		3 (Note: Appearances in K League Championship)	0	28	4
FC Seoul	2009	K League	26	3	1	0	4	1	8 (Note: Appearances in AFC Champions League)	1	1	0	40	5
FC Seoul	Total		60	7	5	0	16	1	8	1	4	0	93	9
Celtic	2009–10	Scottish Premier League	10	0	0	0	0	0	—		—		10	0
Celtic	2010–11	Scottish Premier League	26	3	4	1	3	0	2 (Note: One appearance in UEFA Champions League, one appearance in UEFA Europa League)	0	—		35	4
Celtic	2011–12	Scottish Premier League	30	6	2	0	3	0	7 (Note: Appearances in UEFA Europa League)	1	—		42	7
Celtic	Total		66	9	6	1	6	0	9	1	—		87	11
Swansea City	2012–13	Premier League	29	0	2	0	7	0	—		—		38	0
Swansea City	2013–14	Premier League	1	0	0	0	0	0	2	0	—		3	0
Swansea City	2014–15	Premier League	33	8	0	0	1	0	—		—		34	8
Swansea City	2015–16	Premier League	28	2	0	0	2	0	—		—		30	2
Swansea City	2016–17	Premier League	23	0	1	0	1	0	—		—		25	0
Swansea City	2017–18	Premier League	25	2	6	0	1	0	—		—		32	2
Swansea City	Total		139	12	9	0	12	0	2	0	—		162	12
Sunderland (loan)	2013–14	Premier League	27	3	1	0	6	1	—		—		34	4
Newcastle United	2018–19	Premier League	18	0	0	0	1	0	—		—		19	0
Newcastle United	2019–20	Premier League	3	0	1	0	0	0	—		—		4	0
Newcastle United	Total		21	0	1	0	1	0	—		—		23	0
Mallorca	2019–20	La Liga	1	0	0	0	—		—		—		1	0
FC Seoul	2020	K League 1	5	0	0	0	—		—		—		5	0
FC Seoul	2021	K League 1	35	3	0	0	—		—		—		35	3
FC Seoul	2022	K League 1	35	0	4	1	—		—		—		39	1
FC Seoul	2023	K League 1	35	2	0	0	—		—		—		35	2
FC Seoul	2024	K League 1	20	2	0	0	—		—		—		20	2
FC Seoul	2025	K League 1	8	0	0	0	—		—		—		8	0
FC Seoul	Total		138	7	4	1	—		—		—		142	8
Pohang Steelers	2025	K League 1	16	0	—		—		2 (Note: Appearances in AFC Champions League Two)	0	—		18	0
Career total			468	38	26	2	41	2	21	2	4	0	560	44

=== International ===
Appearances and goals by national team and year
National team	Year	Apps	Goals
South Korea	2008	6	2
South Korea	2009	11	2
South Korea	2010	13	0
South Korea	2011	14	1
South Korea	2012	5	0
South Korea	2013	6	0
South Korea	2014	11	0
South Korea	2015	14	3
South Korea	2016	9	1
South Korea	2017	8	1
South Korea	2018	12	0
South Korea	2019	1	0
Career total		110	10

Scores and results list South Korea's goal tally first, score column indicates score after each Ki goal.

List of international goals scored by Ki Sung-yueng
No.	Date	Venue	Caps	Opponent	Score	Result	Competition
1	10 September 2008	Hongkou Football Stadium, Shanghai, China	2	North Korea	1–1	1–1	2010 FIFA World Cup qualification
2	11 October 2008	Suwon World Cup Stadium, Suwon, South Korea	3	Uzbekistan	1–0	3–0	Friendly
3	6 June 2009	Al Maktoum Stadium, Dubai, United Arab Emirates	11	United Arab Emirates	2–0	2–0	2010 FIFA World Cup qualification
4	14 October 2009	Seoul World Cup Stadium, Seoul, South Korea	16	Senegal	1–0	2–0	Friendly
5	25 January 2011	Thani bin Jassim Stadium, Al Rayyan, Qatar	35	Japan	1–0	2–2 (a.e.t.) (0–3 p)	2011 AFC Asian Cup
6	13 October 2015	Seoul World Cup Stadium, Seoul, South Korea	78	Jamaica	2–0	3–0	Friendly
7	17 November 2015	New Laos National Stadium, Vientiane, Laos	80	Laos	1–0	5–0	2018 FIFA World Cup qualification
8	17 November 2015	New Laos National Stadium, Vientiane, Laos	80	Laos	2–0	5–0	2018 FIFA World Cup qualification
9	6 October 2016	Suwon World Cup Stadium, Suwon, South Korea	87	Qatar	1–0	3–2	2018 FIFA World Cup qualification
10	13 June 2017	Jassim Bin Hamad Stadium, Al Rayyan, Qatar	93	Qatar	1–2	2–3	2018 FIFA World Cup qualification

== Honours ==
Celtic

- Scottish Premier League: 2011–12
- Scottish Cup: 2010–11
- Scottish League Cup runner-up: 2011–12

Swansea City

- Football League Cup: 2012–13

Sunderland

- Football League Cup runner-up: 2013–14

FC Seoul

- Korean FA Cup runner-up: 2022

South Korea U20

- AFC Youth Championship third place: 2006

South Korea U23

- Summer Olympics bronze medal: 2012

South Korea

- AFC Asian Cup runner-up: 2015

Individual

- K League 1 Best XI: 2008, 2009
- K League Players' Player of the Year: 2009
- K League All-Star: 2009, 2026
- AFC Youth Player of the Year: 2009
- Scottish Premier League Young Player of the Month: October 2010
- Korean FA Player of the Year: 2011, 2012, 2016
- Korean FA Fans' Player of the Year: 2011, 2012
- AFC Asian Cup Team of the Tournament: 2015
- Swansea City Player of the Season: 2014–15
- K League Player of the Month: March 2021
- K League Goal of the Month: October–December 2023

== See also ==
- List of men's footballers with 100 or more international caps
