= Jose Roberto Alves =

Brazilian footballer (born 1954)

Personal information
- Full name: Jose Roberto Alves
- Date of birth: October 20, 1954
- Place of birth: Brazil
- Position: Forward

Senior career*
Years	Team	Apps	(Gls)
?–?	?	?	
1983	→ POSCO Dolphins (loan)	5	(0)
- * Club domestic league appearances and goals

Jose Roberto Alves (born 13 October 1954) is a Brazilian football player.

== Club career ==
He mainly played for clubs in Brazil. He also played for Pohang Steelers of the South Korean K League, then known as the POSCO Dolphins.

He was first foreign player of K League with Sergio Luis Cogo.

He only appeared in K League (5 matches).
