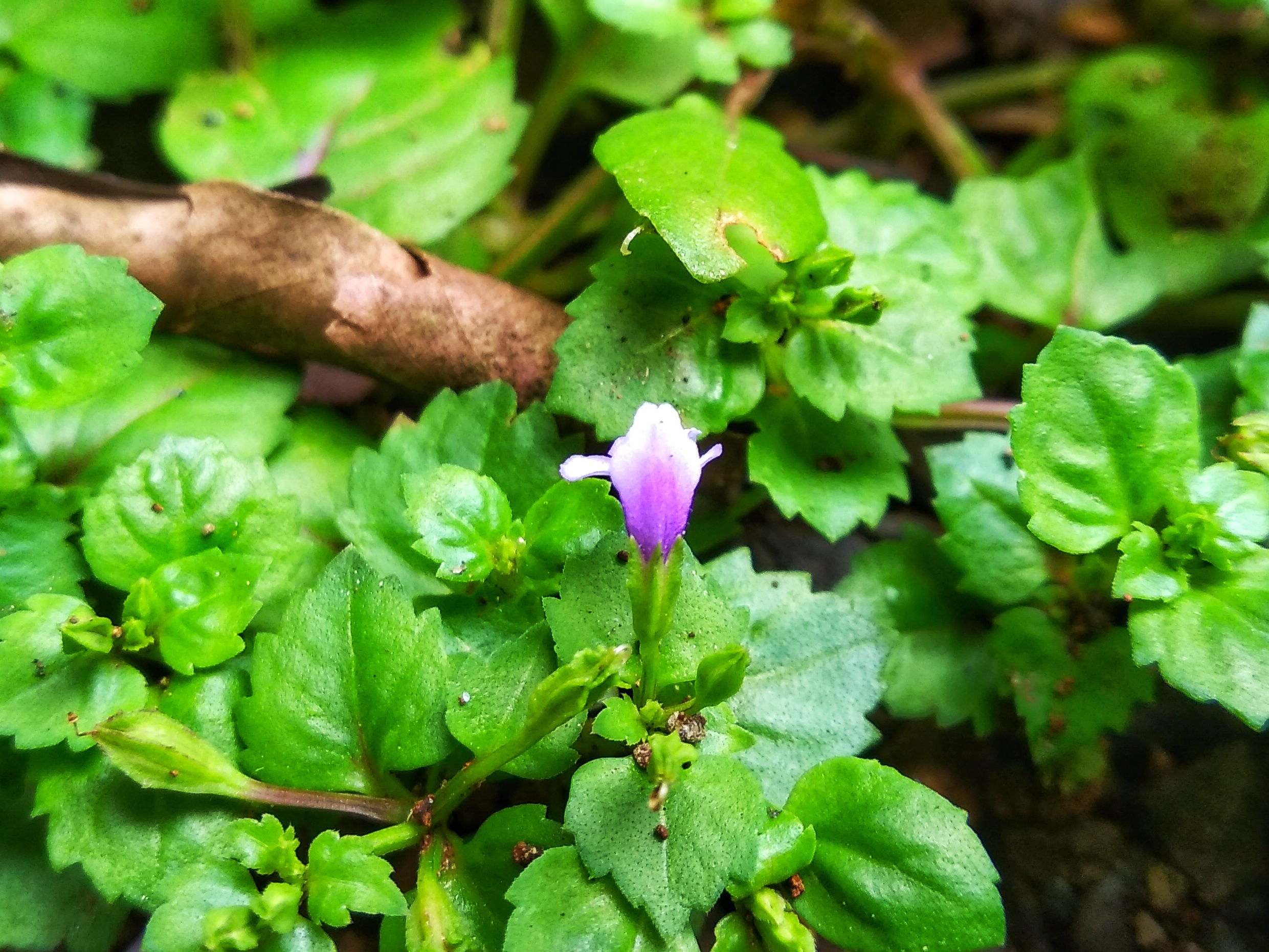

Conservation status
- Least Concern (IUCN 3.1)

Scientific classification
- Kingdom: Plantae
- Clade: Embryophytes
- Clade: Tracheophytes
- Clade: Angiosperms
- Clade: Eudicots
- Clade: Asterids
- Order: Lamiales
- Family: Linderniaceae
- Genus: Torenia
- Species: T. crustacea

Binomial name
- Torenia crustacea (L.) Cham. & Schltdl.

Synonyms
- List: Lindernia crustacea (L.) F.Muell.; Pyxidaria crustacea (L.) Kuntze; Vandellia crustacea (L.) Benth.; Capraria crustacea L.; Hornemannia ovata Link & Otto; Lindernia gracilis (Bonati) Bonati; Lindernia minuta (Blume) Koord.; Lindernia obtusa (Blume) Koord.; Lindernia racemosa Bonati; Pentsteira paniculata Griff.; Pyxidaria minuta (Blume) Kuntze; Pyxidaria obtusa (Blume) Kuntze; Tittmannia ovata Rchb.; Tittmannia scabra Spreng.; Torenia flaccida R.Br.; Torenia hexandra R.Br.; Torenia lucida Buch.-Ham. ex Wall.; Torenia minuta Blume; Torenia obtusa Blume; Torenia ovata Sweet; Torenia rubella Buch.-Ham.; Torenia scabra R.Br.; Torenia varians Roxb.; Ucnopsolen cordatum Raf.; Vandellia alba Benth.; Vandellia bodinieri H.Lév.; Vandellia brownii Benth.; Vandellia gracilis Bonati; Vandellia minuta (Blume) Miq.; Vandellia obtusa (Blume) Miq.; Vandellia racemosa Spreng.; Vandellia racemosa Bonati; Vandellia varians G.Don; Buchnera capillaris Desv.; Mimulus javanicus Blume; Antirrhinum hexandrum Forssk.; Antirrhinum hexandrum G.Forst.; Gratiola aspera Roth; Gratiola lucida Willd.; Linaria hexandra F.Dietr.; Morgania aspera Spreng.; Morgania lucida Spreng.

= Torenia crustacea =

Malaysian false pimpernel

Species of flowering plant

Torenia crustacea, commonly known as the Malaysian false pimpernel or brittle false pimpernel, is a species of annual or short-lived perennial flowering plant in the family Linderniaceae. Native to Asia, it has become widely distributed throughout tropical and subtropical regions worldwide and is considered a minor weed in rice paddies and other agricultural areas.

== Description ==
Torenia crustacea is a small, prostrate to erect herb growing 5–20 centimetres (2.0–7.9 in) tall, with much-branched stems that spread widely. The stems are quadrangular (four-angled) with deep grooves and are mostly glabrous (hairless), often purplish in colour, and readily root at the nodes when in contact with moist soil.

The leaves are opposite, simple, and ovate to broadly triangular, measuring 1–2 centimetres (0.39–0.79 in) long and 0.5–1.1 centimetres (0.20–0.43 in) wide. They have short petioles up to 8 millimetres (0.31 in) long, with shallowly crenate or serrate margins and obtuse to subacute tips. The leaf surfaces are mostly hairless except for sparse hairs along the veins on the underside.

The flowers are small, approximately 1 centimetre (0.39 in) in size, borne singly in the axils of leaves or in short terminal racemes on slender pedicels 5–22 millimetres (0.20–0.87 in) long. The calyx is urn-shaped, 3–5 millimetres (0.12–0.20 in) long, with five shallow triangular-ovate lobes. The corolla is 5–8 millimetres (0.20–0.31 in) long, two-lipped, and purple with a yellow or white spot in the throat; the lower lip is three-lobed with the middle lobe larger than the others, while the upper lip is ovate and sometimes shallowly two-lobed. The plant has four stamens and lacks staminodes.

The fruit is a globose to broadly ellipsoid capsule, 3–5 millimetres (0.12–0.20 in) long, containing numerous minute, cylindric seeds. Pollen grains are round, with a diameter of approximately 23.5 micrometres. The plant flowers year-round in suitable climates.

== Taxonomy ==
The species was first described as Capraria crustacea by Carl Linnaeus in 1767. It was transferred to the genus Torenia by Adelbert von Chamisso and Diederich Franz Leonhard von Schlechtendal in 1827, and later to Lindernia by Ferdinand von Mueller in 1882. The species has accumulated over 40 synonyms across various genera including Vandellia, Gratiola, Antirrhinum, and Mimulus.

A 2013 phylogenetic study of the family Linderniaceae proposed reclassifying this species from Lindernia to Torenia, which has been accepted by some taxonomic authorities. The family Linderniaceae was itself segregated from the Scrophulariaceae and recognised by the APG III system in 2009.

== Distribution and habitat ==
Torenia crustacea is native to tropical and temperate Asia, including China, India, Japan, Malaysia, Indonesia, and the Philippines. It has been widely introduced and naturalised throughout tropical and subtropical regions worldwide, including Africa, Australia, the Pacific Islands, Central America, South America, the Caribbean, and the southeastern United States.

The first collection in North America was made in 1916 in Lee County, Florida, and the species has continued spreading throughout the southeastern United States, where it is now found in Alabama, Arkansas, Florida, Georgia, Louisiana, Mississippi, North Carolina, South Carolina, and Texas.

The plant typically grows in wet or moist habitats from sea level up to 1,500 metres (4,900 ft) elevation, occasionally reaching 3,000 metres (9,800 ft). It favours wet ditches, depressions, rice paddies, river beds, roadsides, moist disturbed areas, wet pastures, and edges of cultivated land. It can form dense monospecific carpets covering several square metres on bare, wet soil if left undisturbed.

== Ecology ==
Torenia crustacea is considered a minor weed of rice cultivation in tropical regions. It is an annual or short-lived perennial that can reproduce both by seed and vegetatively through stems that root at the nodes. The flowers are visited by several butterfly species, including Pseudozizeeria maha and Zizeeria labradus.

In the southeastern United States, it is classified as a non-native species requiring caution and management to prevent escape from cultivation, though its invasive potential is still under assessment.

== Traditional medicine ==
Torenia crustacea has a long history of use in traditional medicine across Asia, particularly in Indonesia, Malaysia, India, and China, where it is one of the most common medicinal plants sold in Chinese pharmacies.

Traditional uses include treatment of fever, dysentery, ringworm, skin disorders (including boils, itching, and herpes-like sores), earache, and injuries. In Peninsular Malaysia, a decoction of the leaves is administered to women after childbirth, while in the Moluccas, leaf preparations are applied topically to boils, itching, and wounds caused by forest ticks. In Indochina, the plant is considered to have emetic and cathartic properties and has been used to treat bilious disorders, amenorrhoea, and hepatitis. In Brunei, powdered plant material mixed with rice water is drunk to relieve diarrhoea, vomiting, and cholera. In Taiwan, it is used as a folk remedy for herpes virus infections.

Modern pharmacological studies have confirmed several bioactive properties, including antiviral, antibacterial, antifungal, antioxidant, anti-inflammatory, analgesic, and antipyretic activities. Phytochemical analysis has identified compounds including flavonoids, anthraquinones, phenylpropanoids, and tannins. Research has demonstrated significant activity against the Epstein–Barr virus, providing scientific evidence for traditional antiviral uses.

== Gallery ==
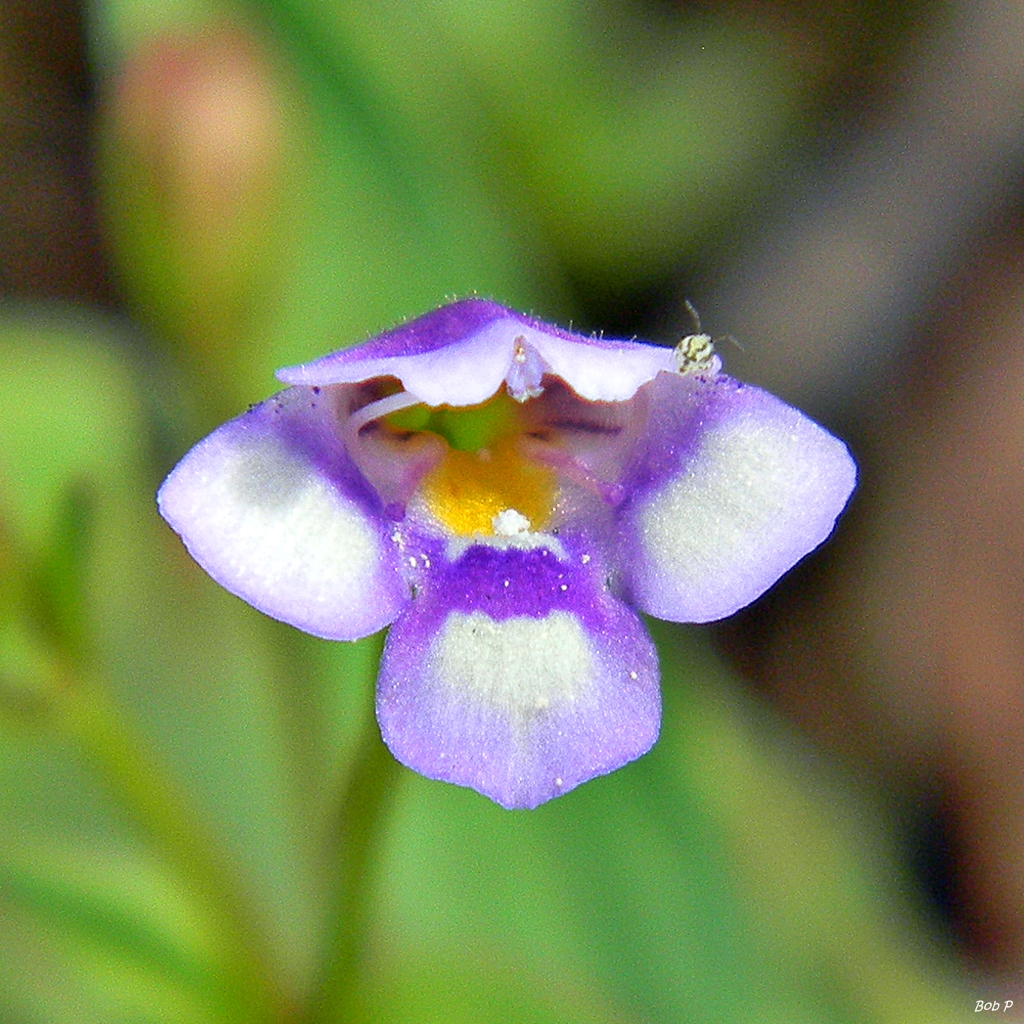
Malaysian false pimpernel flower

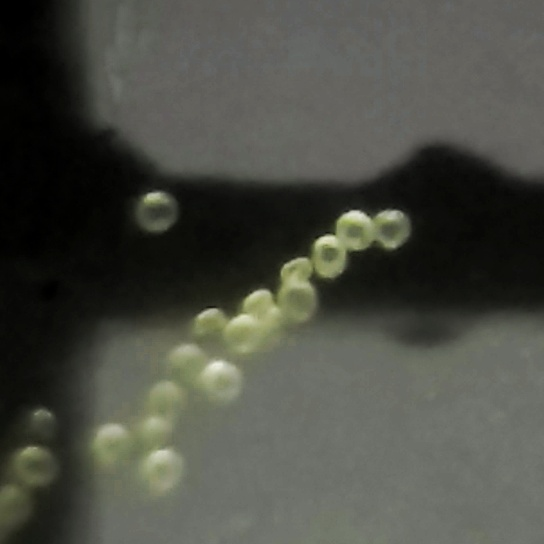
Pollen
