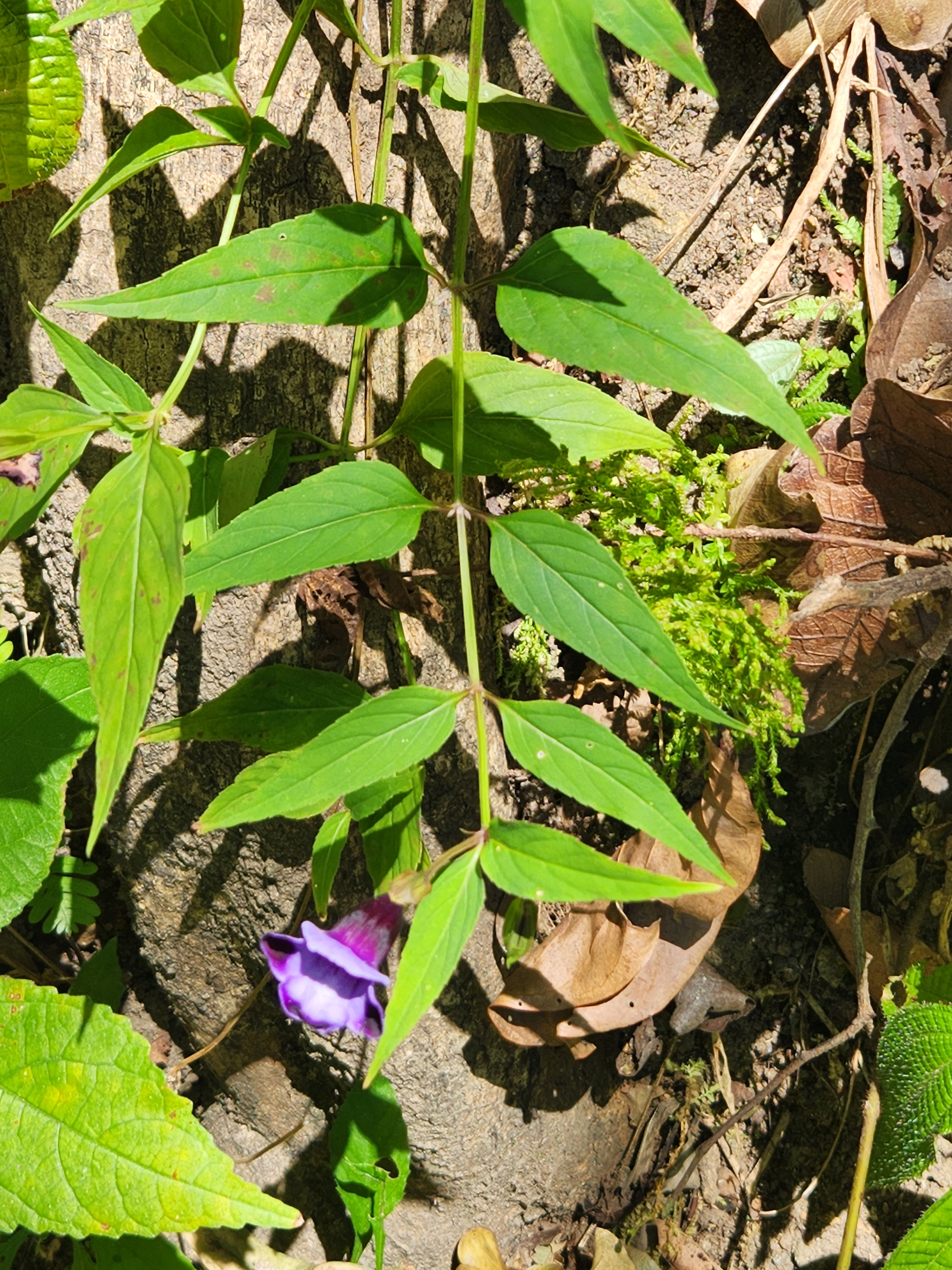

Scientific classification
- Kingdom: Plantae
- Clade: Tracheophytes
- Clade: Angiosperms
- Clade: Eudicots
- Clade: Asterids
- Order: Lamiales
- Family: Linderniaceae
- Genus: Torenia
- Species: T. travancorica

Binomial name
- Torenia travancorica Gamble

= Torenia travancorica =

Species of plant

Torenia travancorica is a species of flowering plant belonging the family Linderniaceae. It is seen in evergreen forests and grasslands of the Western Ghats.

== Description ==
Torenia travancorica is a creeping herb with four-angled slender stems. leaves are ovate, acuminate with rounded base. There are 5–7 pairs of nerves and 1 cm long petiole. Tubular, narrowly winged flowers are axillary. Corolla tube is yellow and lobes are deep blue. Pitted pale brown seeds are seen in 2 cm long capsule.
