= Sergio (footballer, born 1960) =

Brazilian footballer

Personal information
- Full name: Sergio Luis Cogo
- Date of birth: September 28, 1960
- Place of birth: Brazil
- Position: Midfielder

Senior career*
Years	Team	Apps	(Gls)
?–?	?	?	
1983	→ POSCO Dolphins (loan)	0	(0)
- * Club domestic league appearances and goals

Sergio Luis Cogo (born 28 September 1960), known as just Sergio, was a Brazilian football player.

== Club career ==
He mainly played for clubs in Brazil. He also played for Pohang Steelers of the South Korean K League, then known as the POSCO Dolphins.

He was first foreign player of K League with Jose Roberto Alves.

He only appeared in K League (2 matches)
