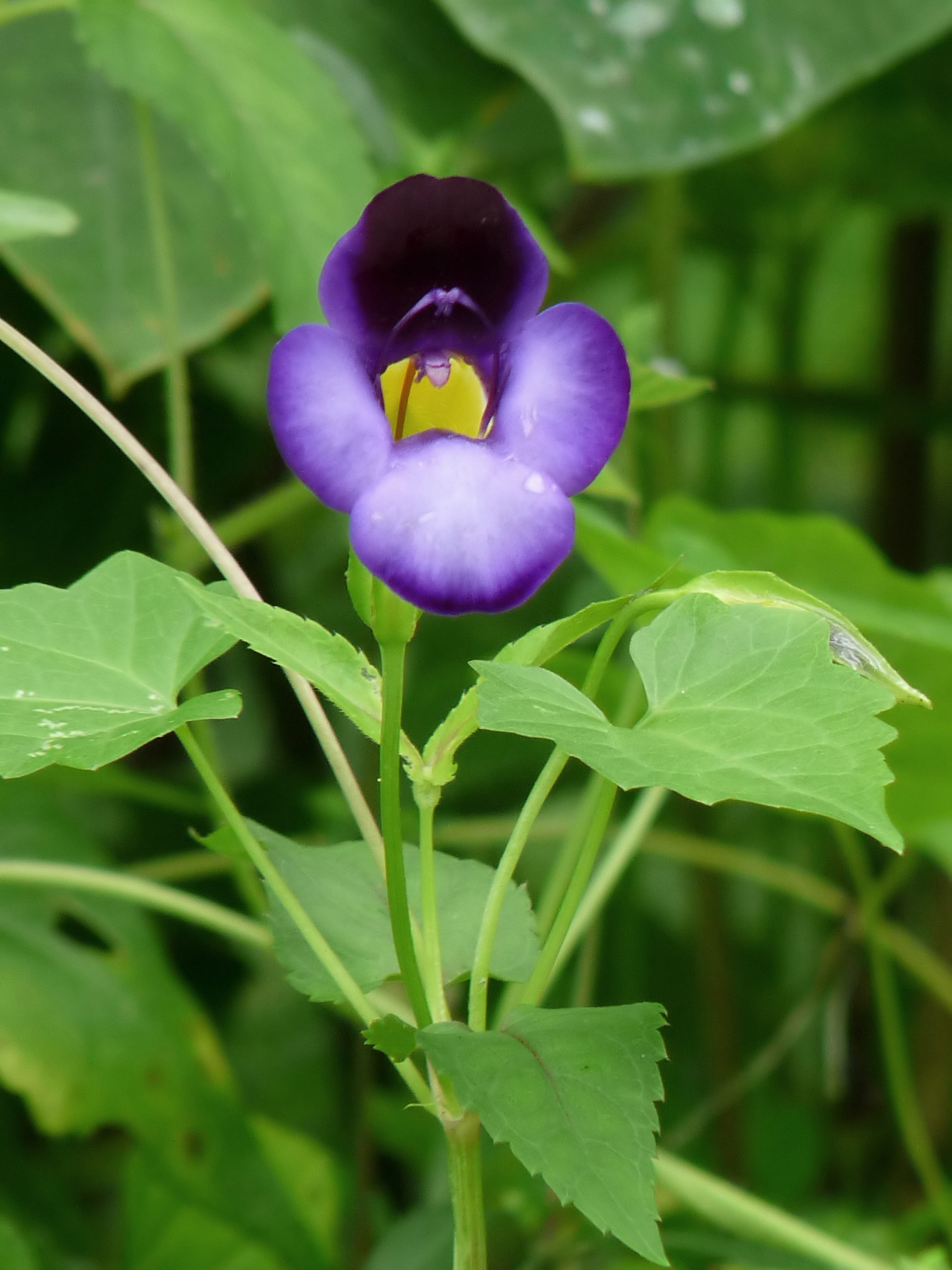
- Torenia travancorica

Scientific classification
- Kingdom: Plantae
- Clade: Tracheophytes
- Clade: Angiosperms
- Clade: Eudicots
- Clade: Asterids
- Order: Lamiales
- Family: Linderniaceae
- Genus: Torenia; L.

Species
- 69; see text

Synonyms
- Caela Adans.; Hornemannia Link & Otto; Legazpia Blanco; Nortenia Thouars; Pentsteira Griff.; Tuyamaea T.Yamaz.; Ucnopsolen Raf.

= Torenia =

Genus of flowering plants

Torenia is a genus of plants now classified in the family Linderniaceae. Torenia has also been classified in the figwort family Scrophulariaceae. Species are often called wishbone flowers, bluewings, or in Hawaii nanioola'a or ola'a beauty. The genus includes 69 species native to the tropical Americas and Africa, tropical and subtropical Asia, and the Pacific Islands.

Some species are grown as garden plants. Many F1 and F2 Torenia hybrids have been hybridized in the last 30 years. Colors can range from white with yellow throats to violet, blue, cobalt, lavender and purple.

== Species ==
69 species are accepted.

- Torenia anagallis (Burm.f.) Wannan, W.R.Barker & Y.S.Liang
- Torenia asiatica L.
- Torenia benthamiana Hance
- Torenia bicolor Dalzell
- Torenia bimaculata Ridl.
- Torenia biniflora T.L.Chin & D.Y.Hong
- Torenia blancoi Merr.
- Torenia burttiana R.R.Mill
- Torenia caelestis Ridl.
- Torenia cambodgiana Bonati
- Torenia celebica T.Yamaz.
- Torenia chevalieri Bonati
- Torenia ciliaris Sm.
- Torenia concolor Lindl.
- Torenia cordata (Griff.) N.M.Dutta
- Torenia cordifolia Roxb.
- Torenia courtallensis Gamble
- Torenia crenata (Pennell) Pennell
- Torenia crustacea (L.) Cham. & Schltdl.
- Torenia cyanea Alston
- Torenia cyrtandriflora B.L.Burtt
- Torenia daubyi Eb.Fisch. & O.Lachenaud
- Torenia davidii Eb.Fisch., Schäferh. & Kai Müll.
- Torenia dictyophora (P.C.Tsoong) Eb.Fisch., Schäferh. & Kai Müll.
- Torenia diffusa D.Don
- Torenia dinklagei Engl.
- Torenia flava Buch.-Ham. ex Benth.
- Torenia fordii Hook.f.
- Torenia fournieri Linden ex E.Fourn.
- Torenia godefroyi Bonati
- Torenia grandiflora (Merr.) Eb.Fisch., Schäferh. & Kai Müll.
- Torenia hayatae Bonati
- Torenia hirsuta Willd.
- Torenia hirsutissima Bonati
- Torenia hookeri (C.B.Clarke ex Hook.f.) A.Pal & M.Chowdhury
- Torenia indica C.J.Saldanha
- Torenia javanica T.Yamaz.
- Torenia kinmenensis (Y.S.Liang, Chih H.Chen & J.L.Tsai) Y.S.Liang & J.C.Wang
- Torenia laotica Bonati
- Torenia leucosiphon Alston
- Torenia maculata (Bonati) Y.F.Deng
- Torenia mannii Skan
- Torenia molluginoides (Benth.) Eb.Fisch., Schäferh. & Kai Müll.
- Torenia oblonga (Benth.) Hance
- Torenia patens Pennell
- Torenia perennans (T.Yamaz.) Eb.Fisch., Schäferh. & Kai Müll.
- Torenia philcoxii Eb.Fisch., Schäferh. & Kai Müll.
- Torenia pierreana Bonati
- Torenia pierreanoides (T.Yamaz.) Eb.Fisch., Schäferh. & Kai Müll.
- Torenia poilanei Bonati
- Torenia polygonoides Benth.
- Torenia pterogona (T.Yamaz.) Eb.Fisch., Schäferh. & Kai Müll.
- Torenia ranongensis T.Yamaz.
- Torenia scandens Bonati
- Torenia siamensis T.Yamaz.
- Torenia siliguriensis A.Pal & M.Chowdhury
- Torenia silvicola A.Raynal
- Torenia spathacea (Bonati) Eb.Fisch., Schäferh. & Kai Müll.
- Torenia stolonifera Bojer ex Benth.
- Torenia subconnivens (Philcox) Eb.Fisch., Schäferh. & Kai Müll.
- Torenia taishanensis (F.Z.Li) Y.S.Liang & J.C.Wang
- Torenia thailandica T.Yamaz.
- Torenia thorelii Bonati
- Torenia thouarsii (Cham. & Schltdl.) Kuntze
- Torenia travancorica Gamble
- Torenia udawnensis (T.Yamaz.) Eb.Fisch., Schäferh. & Kai Müll.
- Torenia umbellata (T.Yamaz.) Eb.Fisch., Schäferh. & Kai Müll.
- Torenia vientianica T.Yamaz.
- Torenia violacea (Azaola ex Blanco) Pennell
