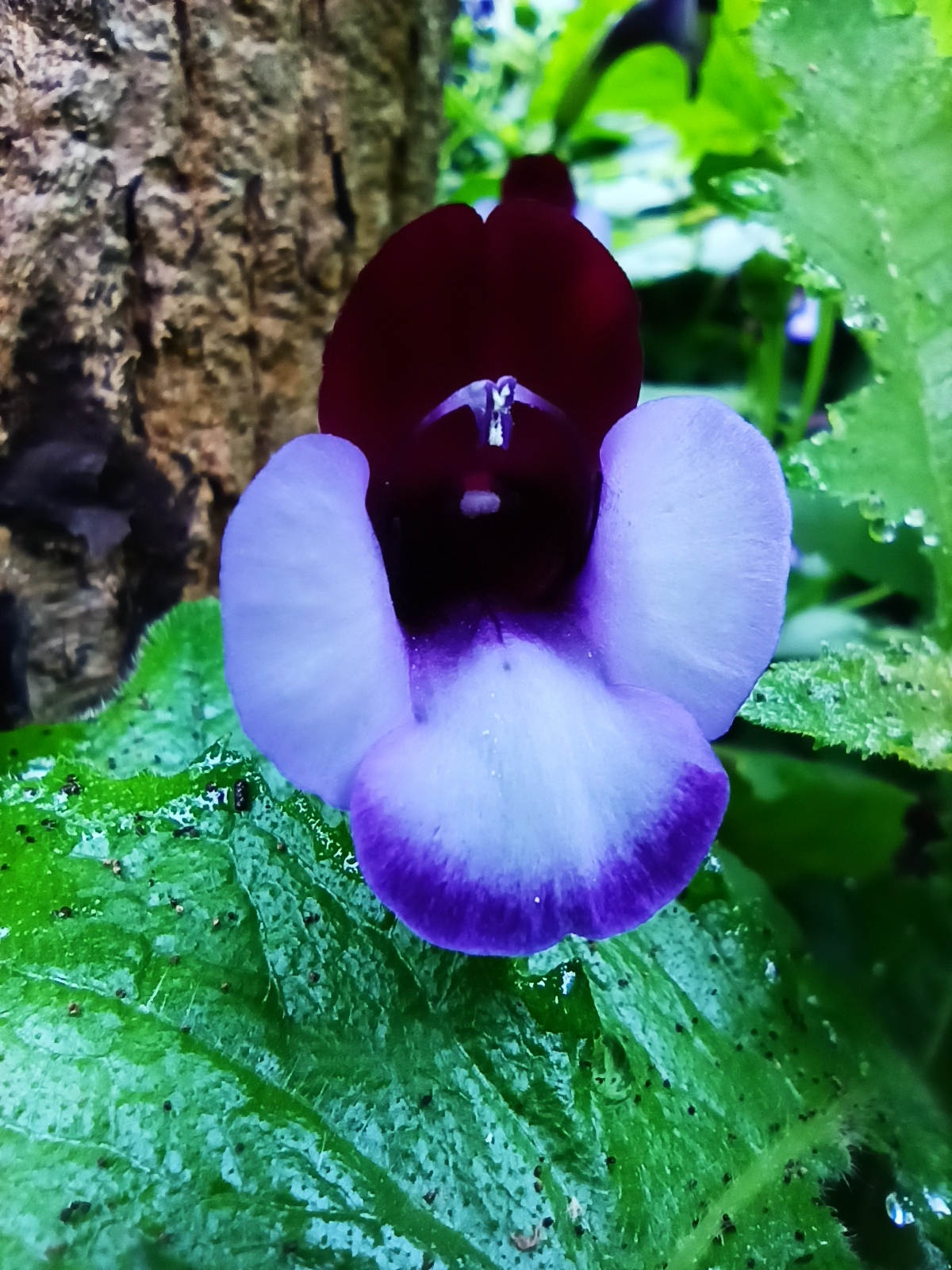

Scientific classification
- Kingdom: Plantae
- Clade: Embryophytes
- Clade: Tracheophytes
- Clade: Spermatophytes
- Clade: Angiosperms
- Clade: Eudicots
- Clade: Asterids
- Order: Lamiales
- Family: Linderniaceae
- Genus: Torenia
- Species: T. bicolor

Binomial name
- Torenia bicolor Dalzell

= Torenia bicolor =

Species of flowering plant

Torenia bicolor, the two-color wishbone flower, is an annual herb found in the western and southern India as well as the Andaman Islands, where it grows mainly in moist and waterlogged areas. The plant has slender, four-sided stems with small hairs near the nodes. Leaves are small (1.5–3.5 cm long), triangular to oval in shape, with toothed edges and a pointed tip, and are carried on short stalks.

== Flowering and fruiting ==
Flowers grow singly or in pairs from the leaf axils, on stalks up to 3 cm long. They are about 2–2.5 cm in length, with a yellowish tube and deep purple lobes. The calyx is green and ridged, partly forming wing-like extensions. The plant has four stamens joined in pairs at the tips, creating a wishbone-like structure, which gives rise to the common name “Wishbone Flower.” It flowers throughout the year.

The fruit is a small, oblong capsule, about 1–1.5 cm long, containing round, rough-textured seeds.

== Uses ==
Torenia bicolor is widely regarded as a model plant in ornamental and transgenic research.
