= Frente Tricolor =

Supporter Group

The Frente Tricolor is the official supporters group of Suwon Samsung Bluewings.

== History ==
In the late 1995, the Grand Bleu was organised as the supporter club of the Bluewings. Originally, the name of the supporters club was CyberWings, but it changed its name to the current name a few years later. With their two general mottos, "The First & The Best" and "우리가 가면 길이 된다" (English: "Our path becomes the true path)", the Grand Bleu has now grown as the largest supporters' groups in the K-League.

In May 2012, the Grand Bleu and Highland Este merged and re-launched the name 'Frente Tricolor', and the name 'Grand Bleu' is dedicated to Suwon citizens, and everyone who supports the Suwon Blue Wings is called 'Grand Bleu'.

The Red Devils, Korea Republic national football team supporters club also started with many of its members from the Grand Bleu. Original of the famous football chant "대~한 민국!(Dae~han Minguk!) is Grand Blue's chant "수~원 삼성!(Su~won Samsung!).
