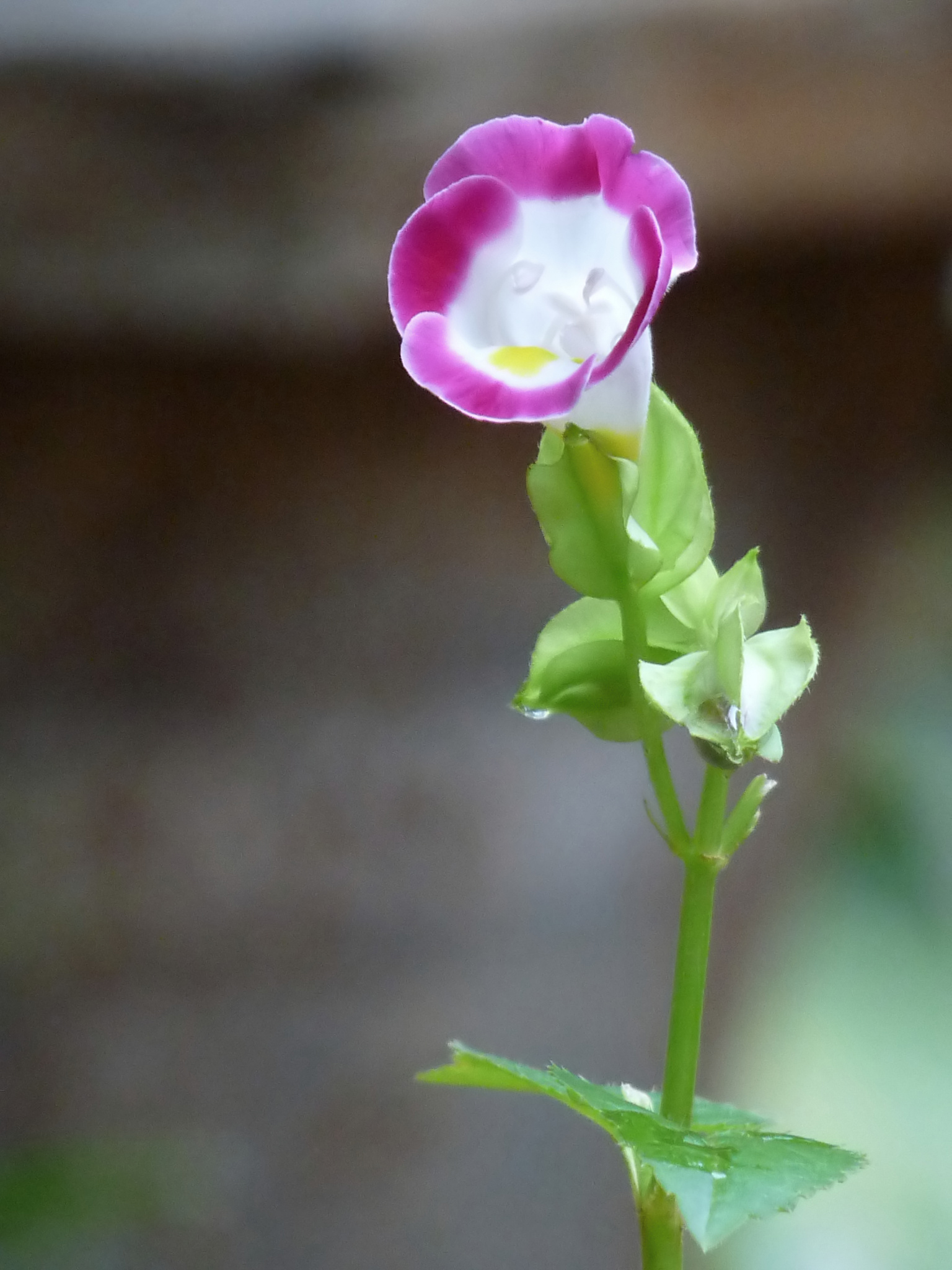
- Torenia fournieri 'Catalina Pink'

Scientific classification
- Kingdom: Plantae
- Clade: Tracheophytes
- Clade: Angiosperms
- Clade: Eudicots
- Clade: Asterids
- Order: Lamiales
- Family: Linderniaceae
- Genus: Torenia
- Species: T. fournieri

Binomial name
- Torenia fournieri Linden ex E. Fourn.

= Torenia fournieri =

Species of flowering plant

Torenia fournieri, the bluewings or wishbone flower, is an annual plant in the Linderniaceae, with blue, white, or pink flowers that have yellow markings. It is typically grown as a landscape annual, reaching 12–15 in. tall. It has simple opposite or subopposite leaves with serrated edges.

== Gallery ==
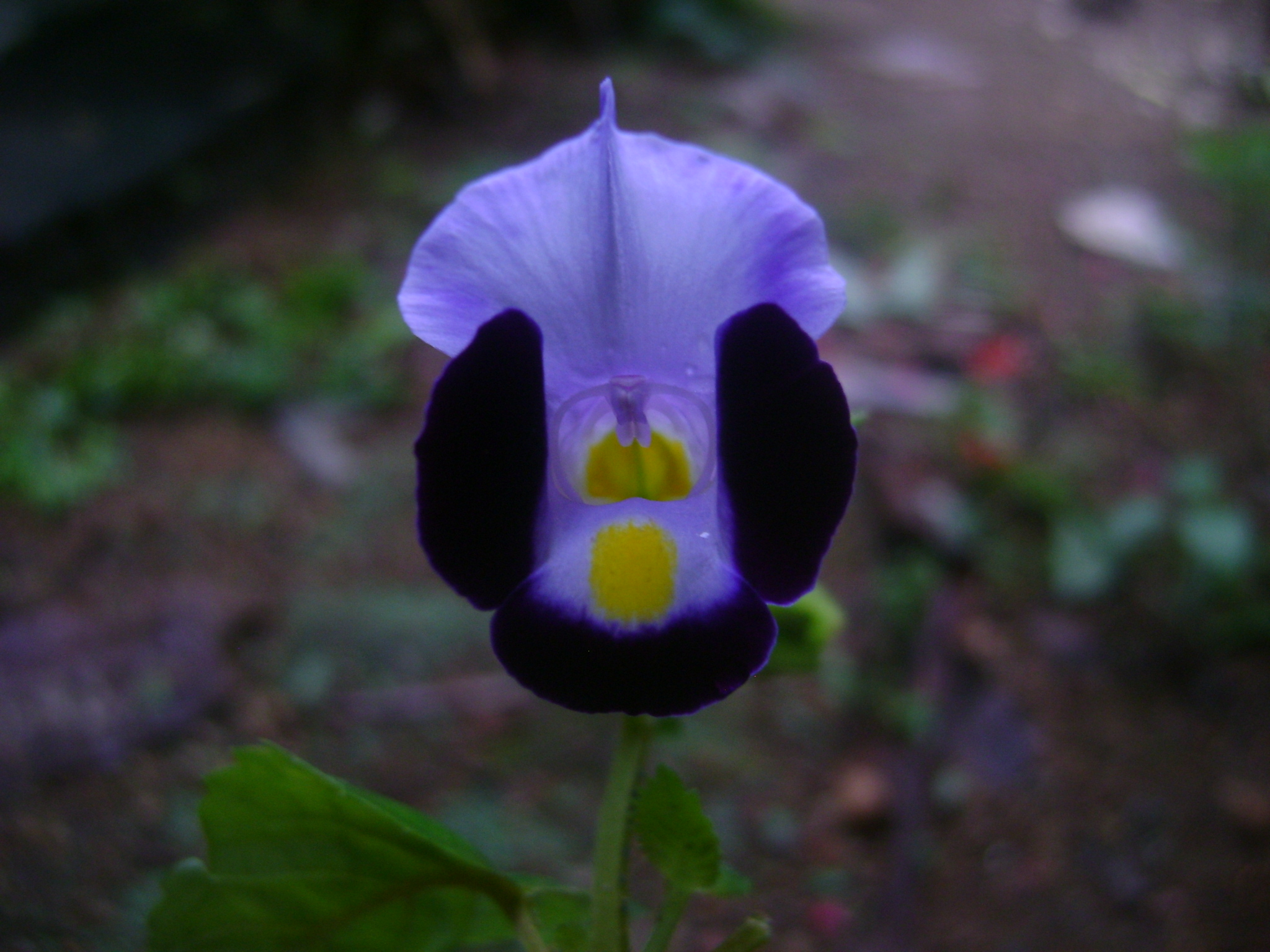
From Kerala, India

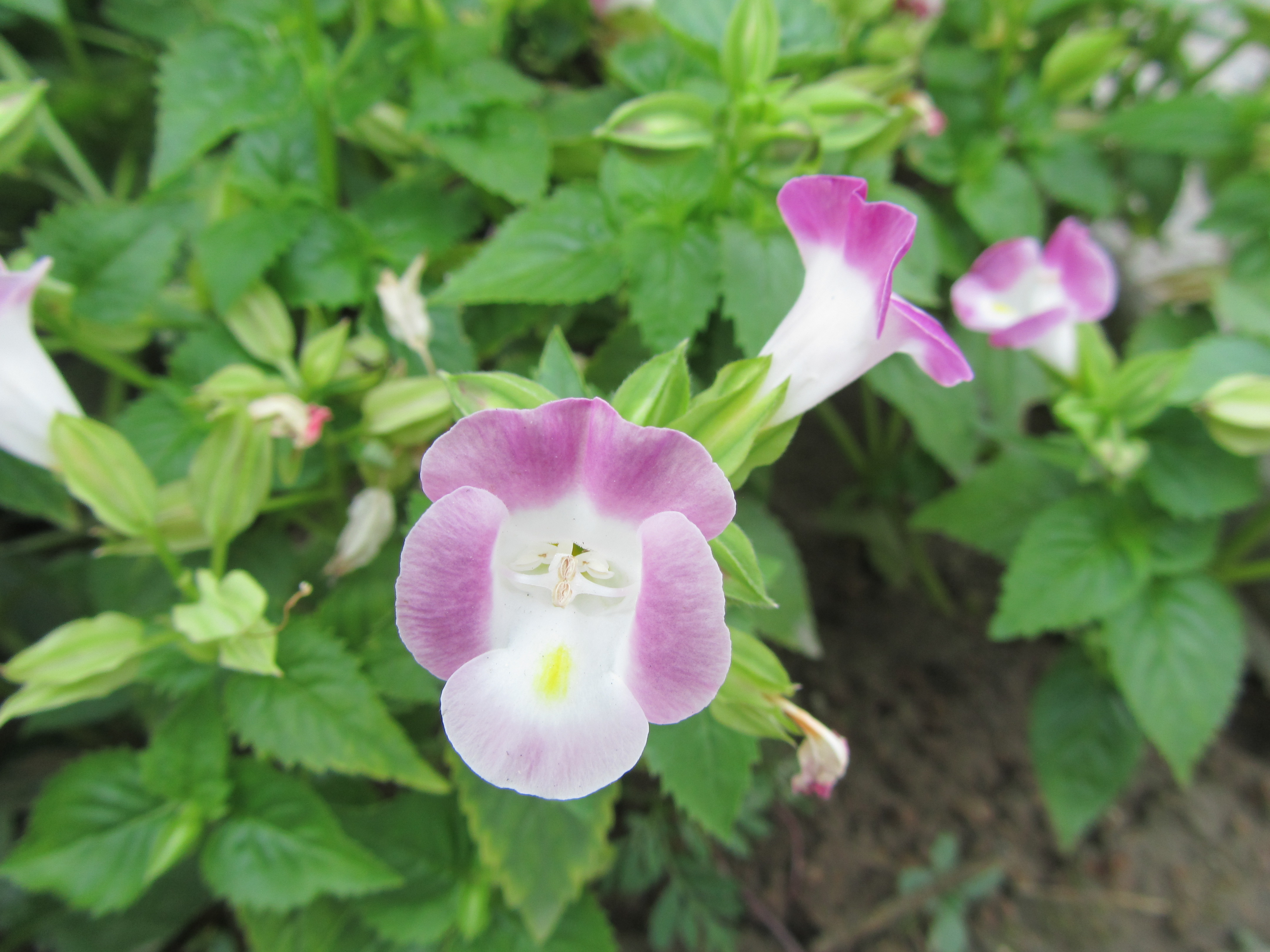

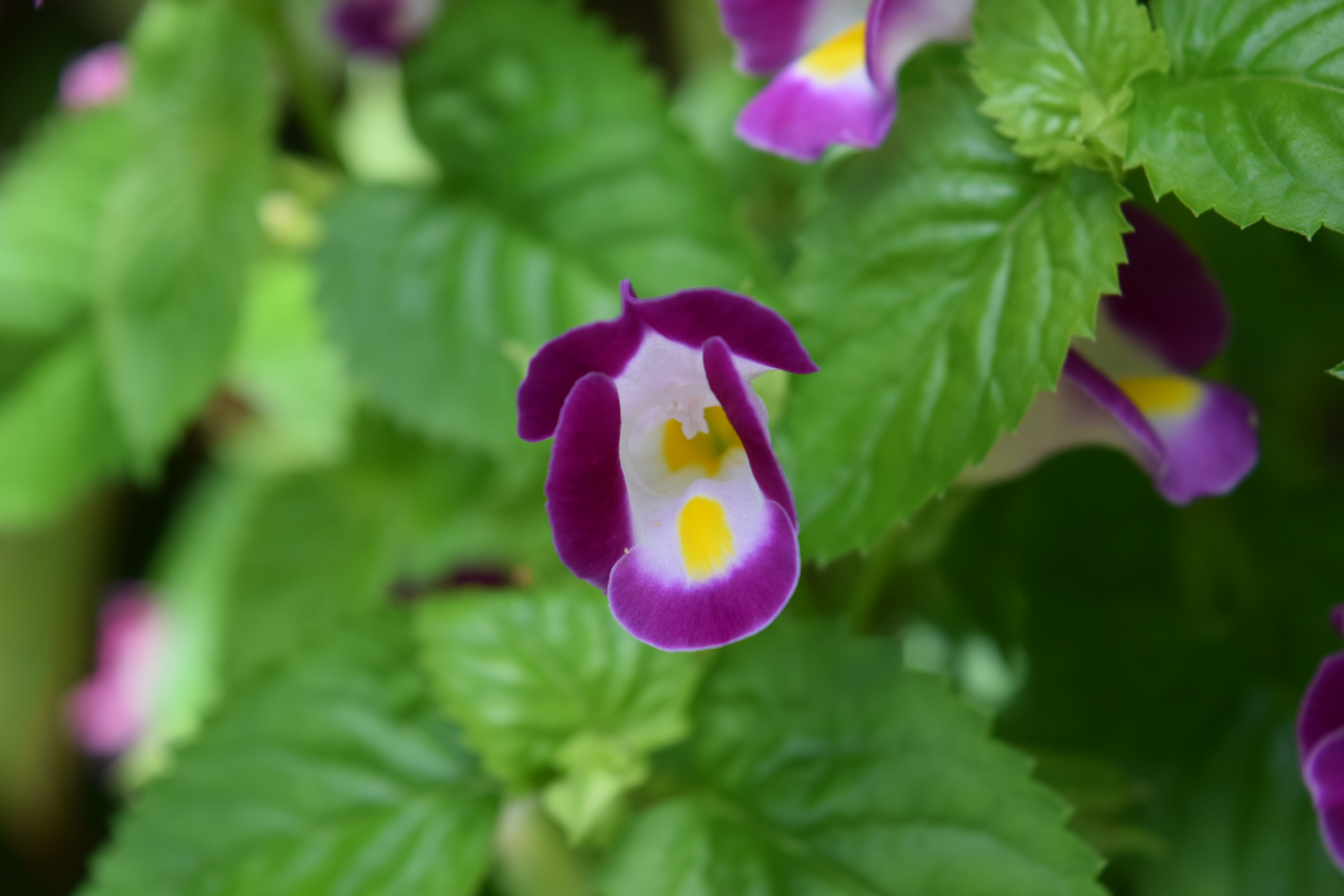

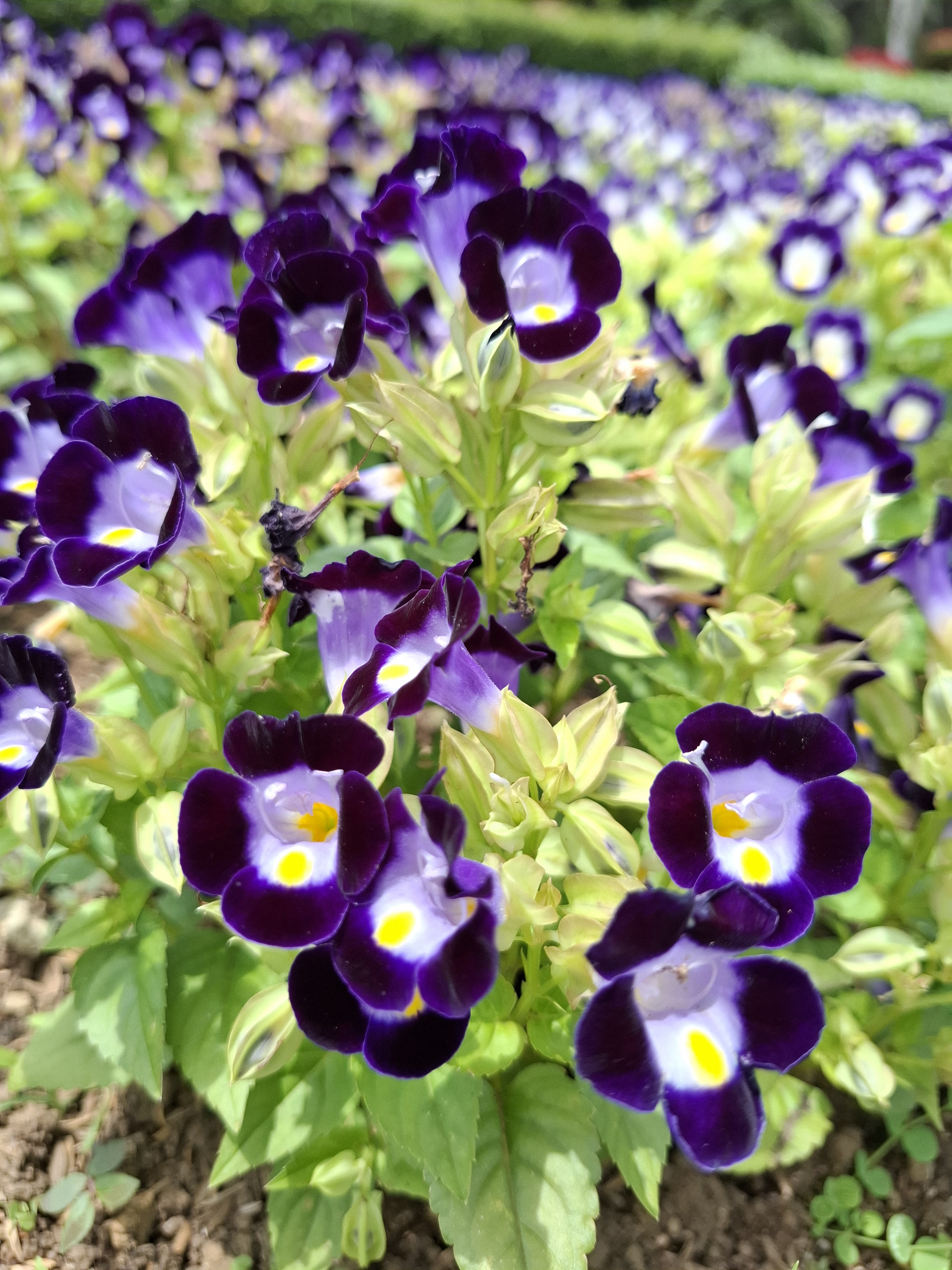
Flowers
