= Football at the 1988 Summer Olympics – Group A =

== Table ==
Pos	Team	Pld	W	D	L	GF	GA	GD	Pts	Sweden Olympic football team	Germany national football team	Tunisia national football team	China national football team
1	Sweden	3	2	1	0	6	3	+3	5		2–1	2–2	2–0
2	West Germany	3	2	0	1	8	3	+5	4	1–2		4–1	3–0
3	Tunisia	3	0	2	1	3	6	−3	2	2–2	1–4		0–0
4	China	3	0	1	2	0	5	−5	1	0–2	0–3	0–0	

Source: FIFA
Legend: Blue = home team win; Yellow = draw; Red = away team win.

== Matches ==
=== China vs West Germany ===
China	0–3 (final score after 90 minutes)	West Germany
Manager: (China) Gao Fengwen Team: 20 - GK - Zhang Huikang; 3 - DF - Gao Sheng; 2 - DF - Zhu Bo; 5 - DF - Jia Xiuquan; 17 - DF - Mai Chao (yellow card) 19'; 4 - MF - Guo Yijun; 7 - MF - Xie Yuxin sub 84'; 9 - MF - Liu Haiguang; 8 - MF - Tang Yaodong (yellow card) 64'; 18 - FW - Duan Ju; 10 - FW - Ma Lin sub 88' Substitutes: 16 - MF - Li Hui on 84'; 12 - FW - Wang Baoshan on 88' Unused Substitutes: 1 - GK - Kong Guoxian ? ? Scorers: —	Half-time: 0–1 Competition: Olympic tournament (group stage) Date: Saturday; 17 September 1988 Kick off: 17:00 KDT Venue: Busan Gudeok Stadium, Busan Attendance: 24000 Referee: Juan Daniel Cardellino URU Assistants: Baba Laouissi MAR; Lennox Sirjuesingh TRI Match rules: 90 minutes Five named substitutes Maximum of 2 substitutions	Manager: (West Germany) Hannes Löhr Team: 12 - GK - Uwe Kamps; 5 - DF - Thomas Hörster (yellow card) 32'; 2 - DF - Michael Schulz; 4 - DF - Wolfgang Funkel; 13 - DF - Roland Grahammer; 3 - MF - Armin Görtz; 14 - MF - Thomas Häßler; 8 - MF - Holger Fach sub 84'; 10 - MF - Wolfram Wuttke sub 77'; 9 - FW - Jürgen Klinsmann; 11 - FW - Frank Mill (yellow card) 61' Substitutes: 18 - DF - Gerhard Kleppinger on 77'; 15 - MF - Christian Schreier on 84' Unused Substitutes: 1 - GK - Oliver Reck ? ? Scorers: 0–1 Wolfram Wuttke (31'); 0–2 Frank Mill (60'); 0–3 Frank Mill (89')

=== Sweden vs Tunisia ===
Sweden	2–2 (final score after 90 minutes)	Tunisia
Manager: (Sweden) Benny Lennartsson Team: 1 - GK - Sven Andersson; 2 - DF - Sulo Vaattovaara; 3 - DF - Peter Lönn; 4 - DF - Göran Arnberg; 5 - DF - Roland Nilsson; 6 - MF - Jonas Thern (red card) 73'; 20 - MF - Stefan Rehn; 8 - MF - Michael Andersson; 9 - MF - Joakim Nilsson; 14 - FW - Hans Eskilsson sub 65'; 15 - FW - Jan Hellström sub 87' Substitutes: 13 - FW - Martin Dahlin on 65'; 10 - MF - Anders Limpar on 87' Unused Substitutes: 12 - GK - Bengt Nilsson; 16 - DF - Roger Ljung; 18 - DF - Ola Svensson Scorers: 1–2 Jonas Thern (44'); 2–2 Jan Hellström (45')	Half-time: 2–2 Competition: Olympic tournament (group stage) Date: Saturday; 17 September 1988 Kick off: 19:00 KDT Venue: Daegu Civic Stadium, Daegu Attendance: 20000 Referee: Edgardo Codesal MEX Assistants: Jamal Al Sharif SYR; Arnaldo Cézar Coelho BRA Match rules: 90 minutes Five named substitutes Maximum of 2 substitutions	Manager: (Poland) Antoni Piechniczek Team: 1 - GK - Naceur Chouchane (yellow card) 28'; 2 - DF - Hachemi Ouahchi; 14 - DF - Mohamed Mahjoubi; 15 - DF - Khaled Ben Yahia; 4 - DF - Imad Mizouri; 6 - MF - Adel Smirani (yellow card) 56'; 12 - MF - Nabil Maaloul; 19 - MF - Modher Baouab; 10 - MF - Tarak Dhiab; 11 - FW - Lotfi Rouissi (yellow card) 64'; 7 - FW - Jameleddine Limam (red card) 73' Substitutes: — Unused Substitutes: 20 - GK - Slaheddine Fessi; 5 - DF - Ali Ben Neji; 17 - MF - Noureddine Bousnina; 8 - MF - Haithem Abid; 9 - FW - Kais Yaâkoubi Scorers: 0–1 Tarak Dhiab (16'); 0–2 Nabil Maaloul (43', pen.)

=== Tunisia vs West Germany ===
Tunisia	1–4 (final score after 90 minutes)	West Germany
Manager: (Poland) Antoni Piechniczek Team: 1 - GK - Naceur Chouchane; 2 - DF - Hachemi Ouahchi; 14 - DF - Mohamed Mahjoubi; 4 - DF - Imad Mizouri (yellow card) 31'; 15 - DF - Khaled Ben Yahia; 19 - MF - Modher Baouab; 10 - MF - Tarak Dhiab; 6 - MF - Adel Smirani sub 75'; 12 - MF - Nabil Maaloul; 11 - FW - Lotfi Rouissi (yellow card) 54'; 16 - FW - Morad Rannene Substitutes: 8 - ? - Haithem Abid on 75' Unused Substitutes: 20 - GK - Slaheddine Fessi ? ? ? Scorers: 1–1 Nabil Maaloul (26', pen.)	Half-time: 1–1 Competition: Olympic tournament (group stage) Date: Monday; 19 September 1988 Kick off: 17:00 KDT Venue: Busan Gudeok Stadium, Busan Attendance: 14000 Referee: Keith Hackett ENG Assistants: Chris Bambridge AUS; Juan Daniel Cardellino URU Match rules: 90 minutes Five named substitutes Maximum of 2 substitutions	Manager: (West Germany) Hannes Löhr Team: 12 - GK - Uwe Kamps; 5 - DF - Thomas Hörster (yellow card) 32'; 4 - DF - Wolfgang Funkel; 13 - DF - Roland Grahammer; 2 - DF - Michael Schulz; 8 - MF - Holger Fach; 14 - MF - Thomas Häßler; 10 - MF - Wolfram Wuttke sub 76'; 3 - MF - Armin Görtz sub 79'; 9 - FW - Jürgen Klinsmann; 11 - FW - Frank Mill (yellow card) 61' Substitutes: 15 - MF - Christian Schreier on 76'; 18 - DF - Gerhard Kleppinger on 79' Unused Substitutes: 1 - GK - Oliver Reck ? ? Scorers: 0–1 Roland Grahammer (4'); 1–2 Holger Fach (50'); 1–3 Frank Mill (55'); 1–4 Wolfram Wuttke (75', pen.)

=== Sweden vs China ===
Sweden	2–0 (final score after 90 minutes)	China
Manager: (Sweden) Benny Lennartsson Team: 1 - GK - Sven Andersson; 5 - DF - Roland Nilsson; 3 - DF - Peter Lönn; 4 - DF - Göran Arnberg; 16 - DF - Roger Ljung; 10 - MF - Anders Limpar; 7 - MF - Leif Engqvist; 8 - MF - Michael Andersson; 9 - MF - Joakim Nilsson sub 84'; 13 - FW - Martin Dahlin sub 76'; 15 - FW - Jan Hellström Substitutes: 11 - FW - Håkan Lindman on 76'; 19 - MF - Anders Palmér on 84' Unused Substitutes: 17 - GK - Lars Eriksson; 18 - DF - Ola Svensson; 20 - MF - Stefan Rehn Scorers: 1–0 Peter Lönn (19'); 2–0 Jan Hellström (42')	Half-time: 2–0 Competition: Olympic tournament (group stage) Date: Monday; 19 September 1988 Kick off: 19:00 KDT Venue: Daegu Civic Stadium, Daegu Attendance: 17000 Referee: Badara Sène SEN Assistants: Gérard Biguet FRA; Kurt Röthlisberger SUI Match rules: 90 minutes Five named substitutes Maximum of 2 substitutions	Manager: (China) Gao Fengwen Team: 20 - GK - Zhang Huikang; 2 - DF - Zhu Bo; 4 - DF - Guo Yijun; 5 - DF - Jia Xiuquan; 17 - DF - Mai Chao (yellow card) 2'; 18 - MF - Duan Ju; 8 - MF - Tang Yaodong; 7 - MF - Xie Yuxin; 3 - MF - Gao Sheng; 9 - FW - Liu Haiguang sub 46'; 10 - FW - Ma Lin Substitutes: 12 - FW - Wang Baoshan on 46' Unused Substitutes: 1 - GK - Kong Guoxian; 14 - MF - Huo Jianting; 15 - DF - Zhang Xiaowen; 16 - MF - Li Hui Scorers: —

=== Tunisia vs China ===
Tunisia	0–0 (final score after 90 minutes)	China
Manager: (Poland) Antoni Piechniczek Team: 20 - GK - Slaheddine Fessi; 14 - DF - Mohamed Mahjoubi; 5 - DF - Ali Ben Nasi; 15 - DF - Khaled Ben Yahia; 3 - DF - Abdelrazak Chachat; 17 - MF - Noureddine Bousnina; 12 - MF - Nabil Maaloul; 19 - MF - Modher Baouab (yellow card) 52'; 13 - MF - Taoufik Mheddhebi sub 58'; 10 - FW - Tarak Dhiab; 16 - FW - Morad Rannene sub 67' Substitutes: 8 - ? - Haithem Abid on 58'; 9 - ? - Kais Yakoubi on 67' Unused Substitutes: 1 - GK - Naceur Chouchane ? ? Scorers: —	Half-time: 0–0 Competition: Olympic tournament (group stage) Date: Wednesday; 21 September 1988 Kick off: 17:00 KDT Venue: Busan Gudeok Stadium, Busan Attendance: 17000 Referee: Lennox Sirjuesingh TRI Assistants: Tullio Lanese ITA; Baba Laouissi MAR Match rules: 90 minutes Five named substitutes Maximum of 2 substitutions	Manager: (China) Gao Fengwen Team: 20 - GK - Zhang Huikang; 2 - DF - Zhu Bo; 5 - DF - Jia Xiuquan; 4 - DF - Guo Yijun; 15 - DF - Zhang Xiaowen; 8 - MF - Tang Yaodong; 3 - MF - Gao Sheng; 7 - MF - Xie Yuxin; 16 - MF - Li Hui; 18 - FW - Duan Ju; 9 - FW - Liu Haiguang sub 82' Substitutes: 12 - FW - Wang Baoshan on 82' Unused Substitutes: 1 - GK - Kong Guoxian ? ? ? Scorers: —

=== Sweden vs West Germany ===
Sweden	2–1 (final score after 90 minutes)	West Germany
Manager: (Sweden) Benny Lennartsson Team: 1 - GK - Sven Andersson; 5 - DF - Roland Nilsson; 3 - DF - Peter Lönn; 4 - DF - Göran Arnberg; 16 - DF - Roger Ljung; 10 - MF - Anders Limpar; 7 - MF - Leif Engqvist; 8 - MF - Michael Andersson; 9 - MF - Joakim Nilsson; 13 - FW - Martin Dahlin sub 78' (yellow card) 24'; 15 - FW - Jan Hellström Substitutes: 20 - MF - Stefan Rehn on 78' Unused Substitutes: 12 - GK - Bengt Nilsson; 16 - DF - Roger Ljung; 2 - DF - Sulo Vaattovaara; 19 - MF - Anders Palmér Scorers: 1–1 Leif Engqvist (74'); 2–1 Peter Lönn (85')	Half-time: 0–0 Competition: Olympic tournament (group stage) Date: Wednesday; 21 September 1988 Kick off: 19:00 KDT Venue: Daegu Civic Stadium, Daegu Attendance: 17000 Referee: Kurt Röthlisberger SUI Assistants: Badara Sène SEN; Gérard Biguet FRA Match rules: 90 minutes Five named substitutes Maximum of 2 substitutions	Manager: (West Germany) Hannes Löhr Team: 12 - GK - Uwe Kamps; 5 - DF - Thomas Hörster; 13 - DF - Roland Grahammer; 3 - DF - Armin Görtz; 2 - DF - Michael Schulz; 18 - MF - Gerhard Kleppinger; 8 - MF - Holger Fach; 14 - MF - Thomas Häßler; 10 - MF - Wolfram Wuttke sub 67'; 11 - FW - Frank Mill sub 46' (yellow card) 23'; 9 - FW - Jürgen Klinsmann Substitutes: 16 - FW - Fritz Walter on 46'; 15 - MF - Christian Schreier on 67' Unused Substitutes: 1 - GK - Oliver Reck; 7 - MF - Rudi Bommer; 17 - MF - Ralf Sievers Scorers: 0–1 Fritz Walter (71')
