= Football at the 1988 Summer Olympics – Men's team squads =

== Argentina ==
Head coach: Carlos Pachamé

No.	Pos.	Player	DoB	Age	Caps	Club	Tournament games	Tournament goals	Minutes played	Sub off	Sub on	Cards yellow/red
1	GK	Luis Islas	22 December 1965	22	?	(Argentina) Independiente	4	0	360	0	0	0
2	DF	Rubén Agüero	20 February 1960	28	?	(Argentina) Estudiantes (LP)	2	0	180	0	0	0
3	FW	Mauro Airez	26 October 1968	19	?	(Argentina) Gimnasia y Esgrima (LP)	3	0	202	0	1	0
4	FW	Carlos Alfaro Moreno	18 October 1964	23	?	(Argentina) Platense	4	3	360	0	0	0
5	DF	Alberto Boggio	14 August 1969	19	?	(Argentina) Rosario Central	0	0	0	0	0	0
6	MF	Claudio Cabrera	20 November 1963	24	?	(Argentina) Vélez Sársfield	2	0	84	1	1	0
7	FW	Jorge Comas	9 June 1960	28	?	(Argentina) Boca Juniors	4	0	351	1	0	0
8	MF	Hernán Díaz	26 February 1965	23	?	(Argentina) Rosario Central	4	0	360	0	0	0
9	DF	Néstor Fabbri	29 April 1968	20	?	(Argentina) Racing Club	4	1	335	1	0	0
10	MF	Darío Siviski	20 December 1962	25	?	(Argentina) San Lorenzo	4	0	360	0	0	0
11	DF	Néstor Lorenzo	28 February 1966	22	?	(Argentina) Argentinos Juniors	4	0	344	1	0	0
12	GK	Fabián Cancelarich	30 December 1965	22	?	(Argentina) Ferro Carril Oeste	0	0	0	0	0	0
13	MF	Daniel Aníbal Hernández	5 February 1970	18	?	(Argentina) Independiente	0	0	0	0	0	0
14	DF	Carlos Mayor	10 May 1965	23	?	(Argentina) Argentinos Juniors	2	0	79	1	1	(yellow card) 1
15	DF	Pedro Monzón	23 February 1962	26	?	(Argentina) Independiente	3	0	189	0	1	0
16	MF	Hugo Pérez	6 October 1968	19	?	(Argentina) Racing Club	4	0	320	2	0	0
17	MF	Alejandro Ruidiaz	3 September 1969	19	?	(Argentina) Independiente	1	0	90	0	0	0
18	FW	Alejandro Russo	13 February 1968	20	?	(Argentina) Estudiantes (LP)	2	0	40	0	2	0
19	DF	Mario Lucca	6 August 1961	27	?	(Argentina) Vélez Sársfield	4	0	306	0	1	(yellow card) 1

== Australia ==
Head coach: Frank Arok

No.	Pos.	Player	DoB	Age	Caps	Club	Tournament games	Tournament goals	Minutes played	Sub off	Sub on	Cards yellow/red
1	GK	Jeff Olver	25 December 1960	27	?	(Australia) Heidelberg United	4	0	360	0	0	(yellow card) 1
2	DF	Gary van Egmond	29 June 1965	23	0	(Australia) Footscray JUST	3	0	210	0	1	0
3	DF	Graham Jennings	18 January 1960	28	?	(Australia) Sydney Croatia	4	0	360	0	0	0
4	DF	Charlie Yankos	29 May 1961	27	?	(Australia) APIA-Leichhardt	4	0	360	0	0	(yellow card) 1
5	DF	Robbie Dunn	6 July 1960	28	?	(Australia) Melbourne Croatia	4	0	309	2	0	(yellow card) 2
6	MF	Paul Wade	20 March 1962	26	?	(Australia) South Melbourne FC	4	0	360	0	0	0
7	FW	Frank Farina	5 September 1964	24	?	(Australia) Marconi Fairfield	3	1	165	1	0	(yellow card) 1
8	MF	Mike Petersen	6 May 1965	23	?	(Australia) South Melbourne FC	3	0	270	0	0	0
9	FW	Graham Arnold	3 August 1963	25	?	(Australia) Sydney United	4	0	360	0	0	(yellow card) 1
10	FW	John Kosmina	17 August 1956	32	?	(Australia) Sydney Olympic FC	1	1	84	1	0	0
11	MF	Oscar Crino	9 August 1962	26	?	(Cyprus) Anorthosis	4	0	360	0	0	0
12	DF	Alan Davidson	1 June 1960	28	?	(Australia) Melbourne Croatia	4	0	360	0	0	0
13	DF	Alex Tobin	3 November 1965	22	?	(Australia) Adelaide City	0	0	0	0	0	0
14	DF	Alan Hunter	30 July 1964	24	?	(Australia) Brisbane Lions SC	0	0	0	0	0	0
15	MF	Andrew Koczka	9 September 1965	23	?	(Australia) St George Saints	1	0	21	0	1	0
16	MF	Vlado Bozinoski	30 March 1964	24	?	(Australia) Footscray JUST	0	0	0	0	0	0
17	MF	Robbie Slater	22 November 1964	23	?	(Australia) Sydney Croatia	1	0	15	0	1	0
18	FW	David Mitchell	13 June 1962	26	?	(Netherlands) Feyenoord Rotterdam	4	0	338	0	0	(red card) 1
19	FW	Scott Ollerenshaw	9 February 1968	20	?	(Australia) St George Saints	1	0	6	0	1	0
20	GK	Michael Gibson	1 March 1963	25	?	(Australia) Penrith City	0	0	0	0	0	0

== Brazil ==
Head coach: Carlos Alberto Silva

No.	Pos.	Player	DoB	Age	Caps	Club	Tournament games	Tournament goals	Minutes played	Sub off	Sub on	Cards yellow/red
1	GK	Cláudio Taffarel	8 May 1966	22	?	(Brazil) Internacional	6	0	600	0	0	0
2	DF	Jorginho	17 August 1964	22	?	(Brazil) Flamengo	4	0	420	0	0	0
3	DF	Batista	20 July 1961	27	?	(Brazil) Atlético Mineiro	2	0	180	0	0	(yellow card) 1
4	DF	Ricardo Gomes	13 December 1964	23	?	(Brazil) Fluminense	0	0	0	0	0	0
5	MF	Ademir	6 January 1960	28	?	(Brazil) Cruzeiro	5	0	432	1	0	(yellow card) 2
6	DF	Mazinho	8 April 1966	22	?	(Brazil) Vasco da Gama	0	0	0	0	0	0
7	MF	Valdo	12 January 1964	24	?	(Portugal) S.L. Benfica	0	0	0	0	0	0
8	MF	Geovani	6 April 1964	24	?	(Brazil) Vasco da Gama	5	1	480	0	0	(yellow card) 2
9	FW	Edmar	20 January 1960	28	?	(Brazil) Corinthians	4	1	237	2	1	(red card) 1
10	FW	Careca	27 September 1968	19	?	(Brazil) Cruzeiro	6	0	458	3	1	(yellow card) 1
11	FW	Romário	29 January 1966	22	?	(Brazil) Vasco da Gama	6	7	600	0	0	0
12	GK	Zé Carlos	7 February 1962	26	?	(Brazil) Flamengo	0	0	0	0	0	0
13	DF	André Cruz	20 September 1968	21	?	(Brazil) Ponte Preta	6	1	600	0	0	0
14	DF	Luiz Carlos Winck	5 January 1963	25	?	(Brazil) Internacional	6	0	600	0	0	(yellow card) 2
15	DF	Aloísio	16 August 1963	25	?	(Brazil) Internacional	6	0	600	0	0	(yellow card) 2
16	MF	Mílton	11 November 1961	26	?	(Brazil) Coritiba	6	0	494	2	1	0
17	MF	Neto	9 September 1966	22	?	(Brazil) Guarani	2	0	100	1	1	0
18	FW	João Paulo	9 July 1964	24	?	(Brazil) Guarani	3	0	112	0	3	0
19	MF	Andrade	21 April 1957	31	?	(Brazil) Flamengo	4	0	375	0	1	0
20	FW	Bebeto	16 February 1964	24	?	(Brazil) Flamengo	6	2	304	2	3	(yellow card) 1

== China ==
Head coach: Gao Fengwen

No.	Pos.	Player	DoB	Age	Caps	Club	Tournament games	Tournament goals	Minutes played	Sub off	Sub on	Cards yellow/red
1	GK	Kong Guoxian	6 September 1965	23	?	(China) Guangzhou FC	0	0	0	0	0	0
2	DF	Zhu Bo	23 May 1960	28	?	(China) Bayi Football Team	3	0	270	0	0	0
3	DF	Gao Sheng	10 May 1962	26	?	(China) Liaoning FC	3	0	270	0	0	0
4	MF	Guo Yijun	23 September 1963	25	?	(China) Guangdong FC	3	0	270	0	0	0
5	DF	Jia Xiuquan	9 November 1963	24	?	(Socialist Federal Republic of Yugoslavia) Partizan Belgrade	3	0	270	0	0	0
7	MF	Xie Yuxin	12 December 1968	19	?	(Netherlands) FC Zwolle	3	0	264	1	0	0
8	FW	Tang Yaodong	17 February 1962	26	?	(China) Liaoning FC	3	0	270	0	0	(yellow card) 1
9	FW	Liu Haiguang	11 September 1963	25	?	(Socialist Federal Republic of Yugoslavia) Partizan Belgrade	3	0	217	2	0	0
10	FW	Ma Lin	8 July 1962	26	?	(China) Liaoning FC	2	0	178	1	0	0
11	MF	Zhu Ping	27 October 1963	24	?	(China) Sichuan FC	0	0	0	0	0	0
12	FW	Wang Baoshan	13 April 1963	25	?	(China) Shaanxi FC	3	0	55	0	3	0
14	MF	Huo Jianting	6 March 1963	25	?	(China) Tianjin FC	0	0	0	0	0	0
15	DF	Zhang Xiaowen	15 July 1964	22	?	(China) Guangdong FC	1	0	90	0	1	0
16	MF	Li Hui	12 February 1960	28	?	(China) Beijing FC	2	0	96	0	1	0
17	DF	Mai Chao	3 May 1964	22	?	(China) Guangzhou FC	2	0	180	0	0	(yellow card) 2
18	FW	Duan Ju	3 October 1963	25	?	(China) Tianjin FC	3	0	270	0	0	0
19	MF	Wang Jun	5 September 1963	23	?	(China) Liaoning FC	0	0	0	0	0	0
20	GK	Zhang Huikang	22 July 1962	26	?	(China) Shanghai FC	3	0	270	0	0	0

== Guatemala ==
Head coach: Jorge Roldán

No.	Pos.	Player	DoB	Age	Caps	Club	Tournament games	Tournament goals	Minutes played	Sub off	Sub on	Cards yellow/red
1	GK	Ricardo Jérez	6 August 1956	32	?	(Guatemala) Comunicaciones	2	0	180	0	0	0
2	DF	Juan Manuel Dávila	7 June 1963	25	?	(Guatemala) Aurora	3	0	270	0	0	0
3	DF	Allan Wellmann	26 May 1954	34	?	(Guatemala) Aurora	2	0	180	0	0	0
4	DF	Rocael Mazariegos	8 January 1966	22	?	(Guatemala) Juventud Retalteca	3	0	258	1	0	0
5	DF	Victor Hugo Monzón	12 November 1957	30	?	(Guatemala) Aurora	3	0	225	1	0	0
6	MF	Jaime Batres	28 June 1964	24	?	(Guatemala) Galcasa	3	0	216	1	1	0
7	FW	Carlos Castañeda	4 January 1963	25	?	(Guatemala) Suchitepéquez	3	1	270	0	0	0
8	MF	Juan Manuel Funes	16 May 1966	22	?	(Guatemala) Municipal	2	0	180	0	0	0
9	FW	Adán Paniagua	30 November 1955	32	?	(Guatemala) Juventud Retalteca	2	1	180	0	0	0
10	MF	Byron Pérez	18 March 1959	29	?	(Guatemala) Municipal	3	0	270	0	0	(yellow card) 1
11	FW	Norman Delva	15 July 1969	19	?	(Guatemala) Deportivo Izabal	2	0	111	0	1	0
12	FW	Kevin Sandoval	18 August 1962	26	?	(Guatemala) Aurora	2	0	70	1	1	0
13	MF	Luis López	20 June 1951	37	?	(Guatemala) Juventud Retalteca	1	0	90	0	0	0
14	MF	Otoniel Guevara	15 November 1959	28	?	(Guatemala) Bandegua	0	0	0	0	0	0
15	DF	Alejandro Ortíz Obregón	1 August 1958	30	?	(Guatemala) Suchitepéquez	2	0	102	0	1	(yellow card) 1
16	DF	David Gardiner	11 February 1957	31	?	(Guatemala) Galcasa	1	0	29	0	1	0
17	MF	Julio Rodas	9 December 1966	21	?	(Guatemala) Municipal	3	0	249	1	0	0
18	GK	Ricardo Piccinini	7 September 1949	39	?	(Guatemala) Municipal	1	0	90	0	0	0
19	MF	Eddy Alburez	29 June 1960	28	?	(Guatemala) Galcasa	0	0	0	0	0	0

== Iraq ==
Head coach: (Iraq) Ammo Baba

No.	Pos.	Player	Date of birth (age)	Caps	Club
1	GK	Ahmed Jassim	4 May 1960 (aged 28)	NA	(Iraq) Al-Naft
2	DF	Adnan Dirjal	26 January 1960 (aged 28)	NA	(Iraq) Al-Rasheed
3	DF	Hassan Kamal	1 July 1964 (aged 24)	NA	(Iraq) Al-Jaish
4	DF	Ghanim Oraibi	16 August 1961 (aged 27)	NA	(Iraq) Al-Shabab
5	DF	Samir Shaker	28 February 1958 (aged 30)	NA	(Iraq) Al-Rasheed
6	MF	Habib Jafar	1 July 1966 (aged 22)	NA	(Iraq) Al-Rasheed
7	FW	Younis Abed Ali	1 August 1968 (aged 20)	NA	(Iraq) Al-Rasheed
8	FW	Ahmed Radhi	21 March 1964 (aged 24)	NA	(Iraq) Al-Rasheed
9	MF	Ismail Mohammed Sharif	19 January 1962 (aged 26)	NA	(Iraq) Al-Shabab
10	FW	Hussein Saeed (c)	21 January 1958 (aged 30)	NA	(Iraq) Al-Talaba
11	FW	Saad Qais	2 July 1967 (aged 21)	NA	(Iraq) Al-Rasheed
12	DF	Karim Salman	4 March 1965 (aged 23)	NA	(Iraq) Al-Rasheed
13	MF	Karim Allawi	1 April 1960 (aged 28)	NA	(Iraq) Al-Rasheed
14	MF	Basil Gorgis	15 January 1961 (aged 27)	NA	(Iraq) Al-Shabab
15	MF	Natiq Hashim	15 January 1960 (aged 28)	NA	(Iraq) Al-Tayaran
16	DF	Mudhafar Jabbar	11 January 1965 (aged 23)	NA	(Iraq) Al-Rasheed
17	MF	Laith Hussein	13 October 1968 (aged 19)	NA	(Iraq) Al-Rasheed
18	DF	Radhi Shenaishil	11 August 1969 (aged 19)	NA	(Iraq) Al-Zawraa
19	DF	Salam Hashim	7 October 1966 (aged 21)	NA	(Iraq) Al-Rasheed
20	GK	Emad Hashim	10 February 1969 (aged 19)	NA	(Iraq) Al-Shorta

== Italy ==
Head coach: Francesco Rocca

No.	Pos.	Player	DoB	Age	Caps	Club	Tournament games	Tournament goals	Minutes played	Sub off	Sub on	Cards yellow/red
1	GK	Stefano Tacconi	13 May 1957	31	?	(Italy) Juventus FC	6	0	600	0	0	(yellow card) 1
2	DF	Roberto Cravero	3 January 1964	24	?	(Italy) Torino F.C.	2	0	151	1	0	0
3	FW	Andrea Carnevale	12 January 1961	27	?	(Italy) S.S.C. Napoli	6	2	352	0	3	(yellow card) 1
4	DF	Luigi De Agostini	7 April 1961	27	?	(Italy) Juventus FC	5	0	480	0	0	(yellow card) 2
5	DF	Ciro Ferrara	11 February 1967	21	?	(Italy) S.S.C. Napoli	5	1	486	0	0	(yellow card) 1 (yellow card) (red card) 1
6	DF	Mauro Tassotti	19 January 1960	28	?	(Italy) A.C. Milan	6	0	600	0	0	0
7	MF	Angelo Colombo	24 February 1961	27	?	(Italy) A.C. Milan	5	0	297	1	2	(yellow card) 2
8	DF	Luca Pellegrini	24 March 1963	25	?	(Italy) U.C. Sampdoria	1	0	29	0	1	0
9	DF	Massimo Brambati	29 June 1966	22	?	(Italy) Torino F.C.	4	0	420	0	0	(yellow card) 1
10	DF	Stefano Carobbi	16 January 1964	24	?	(Italy) AC Fiorentina	2	0	210	0	0	0
11	MF	Massimo Crippa	17 May 1965	23	?	(Italy) S.S.C. Napoli	5	1	449	0	1	(yellow card) 1
12	GK	Giuliano Giuliani	29 September 1958	29	?	(Italy) S.S.C. Napoli	0	0	0	0	0	0
13	FW	Pietro Paolo Virdis	26 June 1957	31	?	(Italy) A.C. Milan	6	3	568	1	0	0
14	FW	Ruggiero Rizzitelli	2 September 1967	21	?	(Italy) A.S. Roma	4	1	280	3	1	(yellow card) 1
15	MF	Roberto Galia	16 March 1963	25	?	(Italy) Juventus FC	3	0	210	0	1	(yellow card) 1
16	MF	Giuseppe Iachini	7 May 1964	24	?	(Italy) Hellas Verona F.C.	5	0	489	1	0	(yellow card) 2
17	MF	Stefano Desideri	3 July 1965	23	?	(Italy) A.S. Roma	2	1	41	0	2	0
18	MF	Massimo Mauro	24 May 1962	26	?	(Italy) Juventus FC	6	1	591	1	0	(yellow card) 1
19	MF	Alberico Evani	1 January 1963	25	?	(Italy) A.C. Milan	4	1	293	3	0	(yellow card) 1
20	GK	Gianluca Pagliuca	18 December 1966	21	?	(Italy) U.C. Sampdoria	0	0	0	0	0	0

== South Korea ==
Head coach: (South Korea) Kim Jung-Nam

No.	Pos.	Player	DoB	Age	Caps	Club	Tournament games	Tournament goals	Minutes played	Sub off	Sub on	Cards yellow/red
1	GK	Cho Byung-deuk	26 May 1958	30	?	(South Korea) POSCO Atoms	3	0	270	0	0	0
2	DF	Park Kyung-hoon	19 January 1961	27	?	(South Korea) POSCO Atoms	3	0	270	0	0	(yellow card) 1
3	MF	Choi Kang-hee	12 April 1959	29	?	(South Korea) Hyundai Horangi	3	0	196	2	0	0
4	DF	Cho Min-kook	5 July 1963	25	?	(South Korea) Lucky-Goldstar Hwangso	3	0	270	0	0	0
5	DF	Chung Yong-hwan	10 February 1960	28	?	(South Korea) Daewoo Royals	3	0	270	0	0	0
6	MF	Lee Tae-ho	29 January 1961	27	?	(South Korea) Daewoo Royals	1	0	49	0	1	0
7	FW	Noh Soo-jin	10 February 1962	26	?	(South Korea) Yukong Elephants	1	1	70	1	0	0
8	FW	Chung Hae-won	1 July 1959	29	?	(South Korea) Daewoo Royals	1	0	24	1	0	0
9	FW	Kim Yong-se	21 April 1960	28	?	(South Korea) Yukong Elephants	1	0	9	0	1	0
10	FW	Choi Sang-kook	15 February 1961	27	?	(South Korea) POSCO Atoms	3	0	246	0	1	0
11	FW	Byun Byung-joo	26 April 1961	27	?	(South Korea) Daewoo Royals	3	0	270	0	0	0
12	MF	Kim Pan-keun	5 March 1966	22	?	(South Korea) Daewoo Royals	0	0	0	0	0	0
13	DF	Nam Ki-young	10 July 1962	26	?	(South Korea) POSCO Atoms	0	0	0	0	0	0
14	FW	Choi Soon-ho	10 January 1962	26	?	(South Korea) Lucky-Goldstar Hwangso	3	0	270	0	0	0
15	FW	Kim Chong-kon	29 March 1964	24	?	(South Korea) Hyundai Horangi	0	0	0	0	0	0
16	MF	Kim Joo-sung	17 January 1966	22	?	(South Korea) Daewoo Royals	3	0	270	0	0	0
17	DF	Gu Sang-bum	15 June 1964	24	?	(South Korea) Lucky-Goldstar Hwangso	3	0	270	0	0	(yellow card) 1
18	DF	Choi Yun-kyum	21 April 1962	26	?	(South Korea) Yukong Elephants	2	0	118	0	1	0
19	MF	Yeo Bum-kyu	24 June 1962	26	?	(South Korea) POSCO Atoms	3	0	98	1	2	0
20	GK	Kim Poong-joo	19 June 1964	24	?	(South Korea) Daewoo Royals	0	0	0	0	0	0

== Nigeria ==
Head coach: (West Germany) Manfred Höner

No.	Pos.	Player	DoB	Age	Caps	Club	Tournament games	Tournament goals	Minutes played	Sub off	Sub on	Cards yellow/red
1	GK	David Ngodiga	23 October 1962	25	?	(Nigeria) Flash Flamingoes	1	0	90	0	0	0
2	DF	Emeka Ezeugo	16 December 1965	22	?	(Nigeria) Enugu Rangers	2	0	77	1	1	0
3	DF	Andrew Uwe	12 October 1967	20	?	(Nigeria) Leventis United	3	0	270	0	0	(yellow card) 3
4	DF	Ademola Adeshina	4 June 1964	24	?	(Belgium) SC Lokeren	3	0	270	0	0	(yellow card) 1
5	DF	Chidi Nwanu	1 January 1967	21	?	(Nigeria) ACB Lagos	2	0	180	0	0	0
6	DF	Dahiru Sadi	10 December 1965	22	?	(Nigeria) Ranchers Bees	3	0	270	0	0	0
7	DF	Augustine Eguavoen	19 August 1965	23	?	(Belgium) K.A.A. Gent	3	0	270	0	0	0
8	MF	Sylvanus Okpala	5 May 1961	27	?	(Portugal) CS Marítimo	3	0	270	0	0	(yellow card) 1
9	FW	Dominic Iorfa	1 October 1962	25	?	(Nigeria) Ranchers Bees	2	0	112	2	0	0
10	MF	Samuel Okwaraji	19 March 1964	24	?	(West Germany) VfB Stuttgart	3	0	259	1	0	0
11	FW	Rashidi Yekini	23 October 1964	23	?	(Ivory Coast) Africa Sports	3	1	270	0	0	0
12	GK	Christian Obi	2 January 1967	21	?	(Nigeria) Julius Berger FC	2	0	180	0	0	0
13	DF	Bright Omokaro	24 February 1965	23	?	(Nigeria) Flash Flamingoes	1	0	45	1	0	0
14	MF	Osaro Obobaifo	1 August 1966	22	?	(Belgium) K.F.C. Winterslag	1	0	23	0	1	0
15	MF	Mike Obiku	24 September 1968	19	?	(Nigeria) Iwuanyanwu Nationale	2	0	125	1	1	(yellow card) 1
16	FW	Samson Siasia	14 August 1967	21	?	(Belgium) SC Lokeren	3	0	210	0	1	0
17	FW	Wole Odegbami	5 October 1962	25	?	(Nigeria) JIB Rock Strikers	2	0	49	0	2	0
18	MF	Ndubuisi Okosieme	28 September 1966	21	?	(Nigeria) El-Kanemi Warriors	0	0	0	0	0	0
19	DF	Jude Agada	22 October 1965	22	?	(Nigeria) Enugu Rangers	0	0	0	0	0	0
20	MF	Henry Nwosu	14 June 1963	25	?	(Nigeria) ACB Lagos	0	0	0	0	0	0

== Sweden ==
Head coach: Benny Lennartsson

No.	Pos.	Player	DoB	Age	Caps	Club	Tournament games	Tournament goals	Minutes played	Sub off	Sub on	Cards yellow/red
1	GK	Sven Andersson	6 October 1963	24	?	(Sweden) Örgryte IS	4	0	390	0	0	0
2	DF	Sulo Vaattovaara	18 July 1962	26	?	(Sweden) IFK Norrköping	1	0	90	0	0	0
3	DF	Peter Lönn	13 July 1961	27	?	(Sweden) IFK Norrköping	4	2	390	0	0	0
4	DF	Göran Arnberg	1 August 1957	31	?	(Sweden) IK Brage	4	0	390	0	0	0
5	DF	Roland Nilsson	27 November 1963	24	?	(Sweden) IFK Göteborg	4	0	390	0	0	0
6	MF	Jonas Thern	20 March 1967	21	?	(Sweden) Malmö FF	2	1	193	0	0	(red card) 1
7	MF	Leif Engqvist	30 July 1962	26	?	(Sweden) Malmö FF	3	1	300	0	0	0
8	MF	Michael Andersson	24 August 1959	29	?	(Sweden) IFK Göteborg	4	0	390	0	0	0
9	MF	Joakim Nilsson	31 March 1966	22	?	(Sweden) Malmö FF	4	0	337	2	0	0
10	MF	Anders Limpar	24 September 1965	22	?	(Switzerland) BSC Young Boys	4	0	206	1	1	(yellow card) 1
11	FW	Håkan Lindman	2 November 1961	26	?	(Sweden) Malmö FF	1	0	14	0	1	0
12	GK	Bengt Nilsson	31 August 1957	31	?	(Sweden) IK Brage	0	0	0	0	0	0
13	FW	Martin Dahlin	16 April 1968	22	?	(Sweden) Malmö FF	4	0	226	2	2	(yellow card) 1
14	FW	Hans Eskilsson	23 January 1966	22	?	(Portugal) Sporting CP	2	0	162	1	1	0
15	FW	Jan Hellström	21 February 1960	28	?	(Sweden) IFK Norrköping	4	3	387	1	0	0
16	DF	Roger Ljung	8 January 1966	22	?	(Sweden) Malmö FF	3	0	300	0	0	0
17	GK	Lars Eriksson	21 September 1965	22	?	(Sweden) Hammarby IF	0	0	0	0	0	0
18	DF	Ola Svensson	6 April 1964	24	?	(Sweden) IFK Göteborg	0	0	0	0	0	0
19	MF	Anders Palmér	24 April 1960	28	?	(Sweden) Malmö FF	1	0	6	0	1	0
20	MF	Stefan Rehn	22 September 1966	21	?	(Sweden) Djurgårdens IF	2	0	102	0	1	0

== Tunisia ==
Head coach: (Poland) Antoni Piechniczek

No.	Pos.	Player	DoB	Age	Caps	Club	Tournament games	Tournament goals	Minutes played	Sub off	Sub on	Cards yellow/red
1	GK	Naceur Chouchane	3 May 1955	33	?	(Tunisia) Espérance	2	0	180	0	0	(yellow card) 1
2	DF	Hachemi El-Ouachi	25 December 1960	27	?	(Tunisia) CS Sfaxien	2	0	180	0	0	0
3	DF	Abderrazak Chahat	14 January 1962	26	?	(Tunisia) Club Africain	1	0	90	0	0	0
4	DF	Imad Mizouri	20 October 1966	21	?	(Tunisia) CS Sfaxien	2	0	180	0	0	(yellow card) 1
5	DF	Ali Ben Neji	26 September 1961	26	?	(Tunisia) Espérance	1	0	90	0	0	0
6	MF	Adel Smirani	7 October 1967	20	?	(Tunisia) CA Bizertin	2	0	165	1	0	(yellow card) 1
7	FW	Jameleddine Limam	11 June 1967	21	?	(Belgium) Standard Liège	1	0	73	0	0	(red card) 1
8	MF	Haithem Abid	22 September 1965	22	?	(Tunisia) Espérance	2	0	47	0	2	0
9	FW	Kais Yakoubi	18 August 1966	21	?	(Tunisia) Club Africain	1	0	23	0	1	0
10	MF	Tarak Dhiab	15 July 1954	34	?	(Tunisia) Espérance	3	1	270	0	0	0
11	FW	Lotfi Rouissi	13 November 1965	22	?	(Tunisia) Club Africain	2	0	180	0	0	(yellow card) 2
12	MF	Nabil Maaloul	25 December 1962	25	?	(Tunisia) Espérance	3	2	270	0	0	0
13	MF	Taoufik Mehedhebi	13 December 1965	22	?	(Tunisia) Stade Tunisien	1	0	58	1	0	0
14	DF	Mohamed Ali Mahjoubi	28 December 1966	21	?	(Tunisia) AS Marsa	3	0	270	0	0	0
15	DF	Khaled Ben Yahia	12 November 1959	28	?	(Tunisia) Espérance	3	0	270	0	0	0
16	FW	Mourad Ranene	6 January 1967	21	?	(Tunisia) CS Sfaxien	2	0	157	1	0	0
17	MF	Noureddine Bousnina	17 January 1963	25	?	(Tunisia) CS Hammam Lif	1	0	90	0	0	0
18	DF	Mourad Okbi	1 September 1965	23	?	(Tunisia) JS Kairouan	0	0	0	0	0	0
19	MF	Modher Baouab	13 May 1961	27	?	(Tunisia) Espérance	3	0	270	0	0	(yellow card) 1
20	GK	Slaheddine Fessi	15 November 1956	31	?	(Tunisia) Club Africain	1	0	90	0	0	0

== United States ==
Head coach: Lothar Osiander

No.	Pos.	Player	DoB	Age	Caps	Club	Tournament games	Tournament goals	Minutes played	Sub off	Sub on	Cards yellow/red
1	GK	David Vanole	6 February 1963	25	?	(United States) Los Angeles Heat	3	0	270	0	0	0
2	DF	Steve Trittschuh	24 April 1965	23	?	(United States) St. Louis Steamers	0	0	0	0	0	0
3	DF	John Doyle	16 March 1966	22	?	(United States) University of San Francisco	2	1	135	0	1	0
4	DF	Kevin Crow	17 September 1961	27	?	(United States) San Diego Sockers	3	0	270	0	0	0
5	DF	Mike Windischmann	6 December 1965	22	?	(United States) Los Angeles Lazers	1	1	22	0	1	0
6	FW	Frank Klopas	1 September 1966	22	?	(Greece) AEK Athens	2	0	180	0	0	0
7	FW	Jim Gabarra	22 September 1959	28	?	(United States) Los Angeles Lazers	0	0	0	0	0	0
8	MF	Rick Davis	24 November 1958	29	?	(United States) Tacoma Stars	3	0	270	0	0	(yellow card) 1
9	FW	Brent Goulet	19 June 1964	24	?	(England) Crewe Alexandra F.C.	3	1	203	1	1	0
10	FW	Peter Vermes	21 November 1966	21	?	(United States) New Jersey Eagles	2	0	180	0	0	0
11	FW	Eric Eichmann	7 May 1965	23	?	(United States) Fort Lauderdale Strikers	0	0	0	0	0	0
12	DF	Paul Krumpe	4 March 1963	25	?	(United States) Los Angeles Heat	3	0	245	1	0	0
13	MF	John Harkes	8 March 1967	21	?	(United States) National team	2	0	92	1	1	0
14	DF	John Stollmeyer	25 October 1962	25	?	(United States) Cleveland Force	2	0	59	1	1	0
15	MF	Tab Ramos	21 September 1966	22	?	(United States) New Jersey Eagles	2	0	119	2	0	0
16	MF	Bruce Murray	25 January 1966	22	?	(United States) Washington Stars	2	0	180	0	0	0
17	MF	Desmond Armstrong	2 November 1964	23	?	(United States) Baltimore Blast	3	0	205	0	1	(yellow card) 1
18	GK	Jeff Duback	5 January 1964	24	?	(United States) Boston Bolts	0	0	0	0	0	0
19	DF	Brian Bliss	28 September 1965	22	?	(United States) Cleveland Force	3	0	270	0	0	(yellow card) 1
20	MF	Paul Caligiuri	9 May 1964	24	?	(West Germany) SV Meppen	3	0	270	0	0	0

== Soviet Union ==
Head coach: Anatoliy Byshovets

No.	Pos.	Player	DoB	Age	Caps	Club	Tournament games	Tournament goals	Minutes played	Sub off	Sub on	Cards yellow/red
1	GK	Dmitry Kharin	16 August 1968	20	?	(Soviet Union) FC Torpedo Moscow	6	0	600	0	0	0
2	DF	Gela Ketashvili	27 September 1965	22	?	(Soviet Union) FC Dynamo Tbilisi	6	0	600	0	0	(yellow card) 2
3	DF	Igor Sklyarov	31 August 1966	22	?	(Soviet Union) FC Dynamo Moscow	2	0	27	0	2	0
4	DF	Oleksiy Cherednyk	15 September 1960	28	?	(Soviet Union) FC Dnipro Dnipropetrovsk	4	0	297	2	0	(yellow card) 2
5	DF	Arvydas Janonis	6 November 1960	27	?	(Soviet Union) FK Žalgiris Vilnius	1	0	36	0	1	0
6	MF	Vadym Tyshchenko	24 March 1963	25	?	(Soviet Union) FC Dnipro Dnipropetrovsk	0	0	0	0	0	0
7	MF	Yevgeni Kuznetsov	30 August 1961	27	?	(Soviet Union) FC Spartak Moscow	5	0	510	0	0	(yellow card) 1
8	MF	Igor Ponomarev	24 February 1960	28	?	(Soviet Union) Neftchi Baku	1	0	90	0	0	0
9	FW	Aleksandr Borodyuk	30 November 1962	25	?	(Soviet Union) FC Dynamo Moscow	2	0	76	1	1	0
10	MF	Igor Dobrovolski	27 August 1967	21	?	(Soviet Union) FC Dynamo Moscow	6	6	564	1	0	(yellow card) 1
11	FW	Volodymyr Lyuty	20 April 1962	26	?	(Soviet Union) FC Dnipro Dnipropetrovsk	6	0	550	1	1	0
12	DF	Yevgeny Yarovenko	17 August 1962	26	?	(Soviet Union) FC Kairat Almaty	4	0	296	0	2	0
13	DF	Sergei Fokin	26 July 1961	27	?	(Soviet Union) CSKA Moscow	1	0	18	0	1	0
14	FW	Volodymyr Tatarchuk	25 April 1966	22	?	(Soviet Union) CSKA Moscow	5	0	359	3	1	(red card) 1
15	MF	Oleksiy Mykhaylychenko	30 March 1963	25	?	(Soviet Union) FC Dynamo Kyiv	6	5	569	1	0	(yellow card) 1
16	GK	Aleksei Prudnikov	20 March 1960	28	?	(Soviet Union) FC Torpedo Moscow	0	0	0	0	0	0
17	DF	Viktor Losev	25 January 1959	29	?	(Soviet Union) FC Dynamo Moscow	6	0	600	0	0	0
18	DF	Sergei Gorlukovich	18 November 1961	26	?	(Soviet Union) FC Lokomotiv Moscow	6	0	600	0	0	(yellow card) 2
19	FW	Yury Savichev	13 February 1965	23	?	(Soviet Union) FC Torpedo Moscow	5	1	302	1	3	(yellow card) 1
20	MF	Arminas Narbekovas	28 November 1965	23	?	(Soviet Union) FK Žalgiris Vilnius	6	2	496	2	0	0

== West Germany ==
Head coach: Hannes Löhr

No.	Pos.	Player	DoB	Age	Caps	Club	Tournament games	Tournament goals	Minutes played	Sub off	Sub on	Cards yellow/red
1	GK	Oliver Reck	27 February 1965	23	0	(West Germany) SV Werder Bremen	0	0	0	0	0	0
2	DF	Michael Schulz	3 September 1961	27	0	(West Germany) 1. FC Kaiserslautern	6	0	570	0	0	(yellow card) 1
3	DF	Armin Görtz	30 August 1959	29	2	(West Germany) 1. FC Köln	5	0	445	2	0	0
4	DF	Wolfgang Funkel	10 August 1958	30	2	(West Germany) Bayer Uerdingen	5	1	480	0	0	0
5	DF	Thomas Hörster	27 November 1956	31	4	(West Germany) Bayer 04 Leverkusen	6	0	570	0	0	(yellow card) 2
6	MF	Olaf Janßen	8 October 1966	21	0	(West Germany) 1. FC Köln	2	0	27	0	2	0
7	MF	Rudi Bommer	19 August 1957	31	6	(West Germany) Viktoria Aschaffenburg	1	0	5	0	1	0
8	MF	Holger Fach	6 September 1962	26	1	(West Germany) Bayer 04 Leverkusen	5	2	474	1	0	0
9	FW	Jürgen Klinsmann	30 July 1964	24	9	(West Germany) VfB Stuttgart	6	4	570	0	0	0
10	MF	Wolfram Wuttke	17 November 1961	27	4	(West Germany) 1. FC Kaiserslautern	6	2	491	4	0	(yellow card) 1
11	FW	Frank Mill	23 July 1958	30	13	(West Germany) Borussia Dortmund	5	3	421	2	0	(yellow card) 3
12	GK	Uwe Kamps	12 June 1964	24	0	(West Germany) Borussia Mönchengladbach	6	0	570	0	0	0
13	DF	Roland Grahammer	3 November 1963	24	0	(West Germany) Bayern München	6	1	570	0	0	0
14	MF	Thomas Häßler	30 May 1966	22	1	(West Germany) 1. FC Köln	6	0	557	1	0	0
15	MF	Christian Schreier	4 February 1959	29	1	(West Germany) Bayer 04 Leverkusen	4	1	72	0	4	0
16	FW	Fritz Walter	21 July 1960	28	0	(West Germany) VfB Stuttgart	1	1	45	0	1	0
17	MF	Ralf Sievers	30 October 1961	26	?	(West Germany) Eintracht Frankfurt	1	0	85	1	0	0
18	DF	Gerhard Kleppinger	1 March 1958	30	0	(West Germany) Bayer Uerdingen	6	1	289	0	4	0
19	FW	Karl-Heinz Riedle	9 September 1965	23	1	(West Germany) SV Werder Bremen	1	0	29	1	0	0
20	DF	Gunnar Sauer	11 June 1964	24	0	(West Germany) SV Werder Bremen	0	0	0	0	0	0

== Yugoslavia ==
Head coach: Ivica Osim

No.	Pos.	Player	DoB	Age	Caps	Club	Tournament games	Tournament goals	Minutes played	Sub off	Sub on	Cards yellow/red
1	GK	Dragoje Leković	21 November 1967	20	?	(Socialist Federal Republic of Yugoslavia) Buducnost Titograd	4	0	360	0	0	0
2	DF	Vujadin Stanojković	10 September 1963	25	?	(Socialist Federal Republic of Yugoslavia) Vardar Skopje	5	0	359	1	1	0
3	DF	Predrag Spasić	29 September 1965	23	?	(Socialist Federal Republic of Yugoslavia) Partizan Belgrade	2	0	135	0	1	0
4	DF	Srečko Katanec	16 July 1963	25	?	(West Germany) VfB Stuttgart	5	0	450	0	0	(yellow card) 1
5	DF	Davor Jozić	22 September 1960	27	?	(Italy) A.C. Cesena	5	0	405	1	0	0
6	MF	Dragoljub Brnović	2 November 1963	24	?	(Socialist Federal Republic of Yugoslavia) Partizan Belgrade	5	0	450	0	0	0
7	MF	Refik Šabanadžović	2 August 1965	23	?	(Socialist Federal Republic of Yugoslavia) Red Star Belgrade	5	2	446	1	0	0
8	MF	Toni Savevski	14 June 1963	25	?	(Socialist Federal Republic of Yugoslavia) Vardar Skopje	5	0	450	0	0	0
9	MF	Ivica Barbarić	23 February 1962	26	?	(Socialist Federal Republic of Yugoslavia) Velež Mostar	2	0	24	0	2	0
10	MF	Dragan Stojković	3 March 1965	23	?	(Socialist Federal Republic of Yugoslavia) Red Star Belgrade	5	2	446	1	0	0
11	MF	Cvijan Milošević	27 October 1963	24	?	(Socialist Federal Republic of Yugoslavia) FK Sloboda Tuzla	5	0	450	0	0	0
12	GK	Stevan Stojanović	29 October 1964	23	?	(Socialist Federal Republic of Yugoslavia) Red Star Belgrade	1	0	90	0	0	0
13	FW	Duško Milinković	2 December 1960	27	?	(Socialist Federal Republic of Yugoslavia) FK Rad Belgrade	2	0	95	0	0	0
14	FW	Davor Šuker	1 January 1968	20	?	(Socialist Federal Republic of Yugoslavia) NK Osijek	4	0	370	0	0	0
15	FW	Semir Tuce	11 February 1964	24	?	(Socialist Federal Republic of Yugoslavia) Velež Mostar	0	0	0	0	0	0
16	FW	Vladislav Đukić	7 April 1962	26	?	(Socialist Federal Republic of Yugoslavia) Partizan Belgrade	4	0	194	3	1	(yellow card) 1
17	FW	Mirko Mihić	24 July 1965	23	?	(Socialist Federal Republic of Yugoslavia) FK Sloboda Tuzla	0	0	0	0	0	0
18	FW	Nenad Jakšić	12 October 1965	22	?	(Socialist Federal Republic of Yugoslavia) FK Radnički Niš	5	0	236	2	3	0

== Zambia ==
Head coach: Samuel Ndhlovu

No.	Pos.	Player	DoB	Age	Caps	Club	Tournament games	Tournament goals	Minutes played	Sub off	Sub on	Cards yellow/red
1	GK	David Chabala	2 February 1960	28	?	(Zambia) Mufulira Wanderers	4	0	330	1	0	0
2	?	Peter Mwanza	18 November 1963	24	?	(Zambia) Nchanga Rangers	0	0	0	0	0	0
3	DF	Edmond Mumba	4 August 1962	26	?	(Zambia) Mutondo Stars	4	0	360	0	0	0
4	DF	Samuel Chomba	5 January 1964	24	?	(Zambia) Kabwe Warriors	3	0	270	0	0	0
5	DF	James Chitalu	15 December 1961	26	?	(Zambia) Kabwe Warriors	1	0	90	0	0	(yellow card) 1
6	MF	Derby Makinka	5 September 1965	23	?	(Zambia) Profund Warriors	4	2	360	0	0	(yellow card) 1
7	MF	Jonson Bwalya	3 December 1967	20	?	(Switzerland) FC Sion	3	1	234	1	0	0
8	MF	Charles Musonda	22 August 1969	19	?	(Belgium) R.S.C. Anderlecht	4	0	360	0	0	0
9	MF	Beston Chambeshi	4 April 1960	28	?	(Zambia) Nkana Red Devils	1	0	90	0	0	0
10	MF	Webster Chikabala	27 March 1965	23	?	(Zambia) Nchanga Rangers	1	0	19	0	1	0
11	MF	Lucky Msiska	17 March 1960	28	?	(Belgium) K.S.V. Roeselare	1	0	36	0	1	0
12	MF	Kalusha Bwalya	16 August 1963	25	?	(Belgium) Cercle Brugge K.S.V.	4	6	360	0	0	0
13	?	Simon Mwansa	24 October 1967	20	?	(Zambia) Nchanga Rangers	0	0	0	0	0	0
14	DF	Manfred Chabinga	6 November 1965	22	?	(Zambia) Nchanga Rangers	3	0	270	0	0	(yellow card) 1
15	DF	Ashols Melu (c)	6 June 1957	31	?	(Zambia) Mufulira Wanderers	4	0	360	0	0	0
16	GK	Richard Mwanza	5 May 1959	29	?	(Zambia) Kabwe Warriors	1	0	30	0	1	0
17	FW	Pearson Mwanza	1 January 1968	20	?	(Zambia) Power Dynamos FC	2	0	46	0	2	(yellow card) 1
18	FW	Wisdom Mumba Chansa	17 April 1964	24	?	(Zambia) Power Dynamos FC	4	0	341	1	0	0
19	FW	Stone Nyirenda	11 November 1963	24	?	(Belgium) K.S.V. Roeselare	4	1	314	2	0	0
20	DF	Eston Mulenga	7 August 1967	21	?	(Zambia) Green Buffaloes FC	1	0	90	0	0	0
