= 1991 Allsvenskan =

67th season of Allsvenskan

Allsvenskan
- Season: 1991
- Champions: IFK Göteborg (Allsvenskan champions and Swedish champions after winning Mästerskapsserien)
- Relegated: Halmstads BK (via Kvalsvenskan); GIF Sundsvall (via Kvalsvenskan)
- Champions League: IFK Göteborg
- UEFA Cup: Örebro SK; IFK Norrköping
- Top goalscorer: Kenneth Andersson, IFK Göteborg (13)
- Average attendance: 4,435

Allsvenskan 1991, part of the 1991 Swedish football season, was the 67th Allsvenskan season played. IFK Göteborg won the league ahead of runners-up Örebro SK, and advanced to Mästerskapsserien 1991 along with the teams placed 3 to 6, while the teams placed 7 to 10 advanced to Kvalsvenskan 1991.

== Spring 1991 ==
=== League table ===
Pos	Team	Pld	W	D	L	GF	GA	GD	Pts	Qualification or relegation
1	IFK Göteborg (C)	18	9	6	3	29	14	+15	33	Qualification to Mästerskapsserien
2	Örebro SK	18	9	6	3	25	17	+8	33	Qualification to Mästerskapsserien
3	Malmö FF	18	7	8	3	20	14	+6	29	Qualification to Mästerskapsserien
4	AIK	18	7	6	5	21	15	+6	27	Qualification to Mästerskapsserien
5	Djurgårdens IF	18	6	7	5	27	25	+2	25	Qualification to Mästerskapsserien
6	IFK Norrköping	18	5	6	7	24	24	0	21	Qualification to Mästerskapsserien
7	Halmstads BK (R)	18	5	6	7	22	22	0	21	Qualification to Kvalsvenskan
8	GAIS	18	5	5	8	22	29	−7	20	Qualification to Kvalsvenskan
9	Östers IF	18	3	9	6	23	26	−3	18	Qualification to Kvalsvenskan
10	GIF Sundsvall (R)	18	1	7	10	15	42	−27	10	Qualification to Kvalsvenskan

Rules for classification: 1) points; 2) goal difference; 3) number of goals scored.
(C) Allsvenskan Champion; (R) Relegated

=== Results ===
Home \ Away	AIK	DIF	GAIS	GIF	HBK	IFKG	IFKN	MFF	ÖSK	ÖIF
AIK		0–0	2–1	3–3	2–1	0–0	1–0	0–1	0–0	2–1
Djurgårdens IF	2–1		4–2	3–1	1–1	1–2	0–3	1–1	4–1	4–2
GAIS	2–1	1–1		1–1	1–4	1–0	1–1	0–1	1–2	2–0
GIF Sundsvall	0–3	2–1	1–3		1–1	1–1	1–1	0–1	1–1	1–1
Halmstads BK	0–1	3–0	1–1	3–0		2–1	1–2	1–0	0–1	1–1
IFK Göteborg	1–0	2–1	1–2	3–0	2–0		3–3	0–0	1–0	2–0
IFK Norrköping	1–1	0–1	2–0	4–1	1–1	0–3		3–0	0–2	0–1
Malmö FF	1–4	1–1	1–0	6–0	2–0	1–1	1–1		0–0	2–1
Örebro SK	1–0	1–1	4–1	3–1	3–0	0–4	3–1	0–0		2–1
Östers IF	0–0	1–1	2–2	3–0	2–2	2–2	3–1	1–1	1–1	

Legend: Blue = home team win; Yellow = draw; Red = away team win.

== Autumn 1991 ==
=== Mästerskapsserien 1991 ===
Pos	Team	Pld	W	D	L	GF	GA	GD	Pts	Qualification or relegation
1	IFK Göteborg (S)	10	6	1	3	14	10	+4	36	Qualification to Champions League first round
2	IFK Norrköping	10	6	2	2	18	10	+8	31	Qualification to UEFA Cup First round
3	Örebro SK	10	3	2	5	7	13	−6	28	Qualification to UEFA Cup First round
4	Malmö FF	10	3	3	4	9	11	−2	27	
5	Djurgårdens IF	10	3	4	3	16	15	+1	26	
6	AIK	10	3	0	7	10	15	−5	23	Qualification to Cup Winners' Cup first round (Note: AIK qualified for the European Cup Winners' Cup as Svenska Cupen runners-up 1991.)

Rules for classification: 1) points; 2) goal difference; 3) number of goals scored.
The teams brought half the points collected in Allsvenskan to Mästerskapsserien. In case of an odd number of points collected, the resulting half point was rounded up.
(S) Swedish Champion

==== Results ====
Home \ Away	AIK	DIF	IFKG	IFKN	MFF	ÖSK
AIK		3–0	0–2	1–0	1–2	0–1
Djurgårdens IF	4–1		1–2	2–2	0–0	2–0
IFK Göteborg	1–0	2–3		1–0	0–1	3–0
IFK Norrköping	2–1	3–3	3–0		1–0	2–1
Malmö FF	2–1	1–1	1–2	1–3		0–0
Örebro SK	1–2	1–0	1–1	0–2	2–1	

Legend: Blue = home team win; Yellow = draw; Red = away team win.

=== Kvalsvenskan 1991 ===
Pos	Team	Pld	W	D	L	GF	GA	GD	Pts	Qualification or relegation
1	Östers IF	14	8	6	0	36	17	+19	30	Promotion to Allsvenskan
2	Trelleborgs FF	14	8	5	1	24	16	+8	29	Promotion to Allsvenskan
3	GAIS	14	8	2	4	25	16	+9	26	Promotion to Allsvenskan
4	Västra Frölunda	14	5	3	6	27	24	+3	18	Qualification to Relegation play-offs
5	Hammarby IF	14	4	4	6	21	21	0	16	Relegation to Division 1
6	Halmstads BK	14	3	4	7	28	30	−2	13	Relegation to Division 1
7	GIF Sundsvall	14	3	4	7	24	33	−9	13	Relegation to Division 1
8	Kiruna	14	3	0	11	12	40	−28	9	Relegation to Division 1

Rules for classification: 1) points; 2) goal difference; 3) number of goals scored.

== Season statistics ==
=== Top scorers ===
Rank	Player	Club	Goals
1	(Sweden) Kenneth Andersson	IFK Göteborg	13
2	(Sweden) Martin Dahlin	Malmö FF	11
3	(Sweden) Mikael Martinsson	Djurgårdens IF	9
4	(Poland) Mirosław Kubisztal	Örebro SK	8
4	(Sweden) Jan Hellström	IFK Norrköping	8
4	(Sweden) Stefan Lindqvist	IFK Göteborg	8
4	(Ukraine) Vadym Yevtushenko	AIK	8
4	(Sweden) Jens Fjellström	Djurgårdens IF	8
9	(Sweden) Andreas Bild	Östers IF	7
10	(Sweden) Dan Corneliusson	Malmö FF	6
10	(Sweden) Johnny Ekström	IFK Göteborg	6
10	(Sweden) Ola Svensson	IFK Göteborg	6
10	(Sweden) Krister Nordin	Djurgårdens IF	6

== Attendances ==
#	Club	Average	Highest
1	AIK	6,933	24,049
2	Örebro SK	6,454	9,650
3	IFK Norrköping	5,292	8,859
4	IFK Göteborg	4,669	14,110
5	Halmstads BK	4,052	7,301
6	Djurgårdens IF	3,938	10,384
7	Malmö FF	3,836	6,881
8	GAIS	3,328	9,083
9	Östers IF	2,819	3,678
10	GIF Sundsvall	1,935	3,822

== Sources ==
Print

- Alsiö, Martin; Frantz, Alf; Lindahl, Jimmy; Persson, Gunnar, eds. (2004). 100 år: Svenska fotbollförbundets jubileumsbok 1904-2004, del 2: statistiken. Vällingby: Stroemberg Media Group. ISBN 91-86184-59-8.
- Glanell, Tomas; Havik, Göran; Lindberg, Thomas; Persson, Gunnar; Ågren, Bengt, eds. (2004). 100 år: Svenska fotbollförbundets jubileumsbok 1904-2004, del 1. Vällingby: Stroemberg Media Group. ISBN 91-86184-59-8.
- Nylin, Lars (2004). Den nödvändiga boken om Allsvenskan: svensk fotboll från 1896 till idag, statistik, höjdpunkter lag för lag, klassiska bilder. Sundbyberg: Semic. ISBN 91-552-3168-3.

Online

- "Swedish Football Tables - List of final tables". RSSSF. 2011.
- "SFS-Bolletinen". Sveriges Fotbollshistoriker och Statistiker. 2008. Archived from the original on 3 October 2008.
