= Vaattovaara =

Vaattovaara is a surname. Notable people with the surname include:

- Sulo Vaattovaara (born 1962), Swedish footballer
- Vilma Vaattovaara (born 1993), Finnish ice hockey player
