= Jonny Rödlund =

Swedish footballer

Personal information
- Full name: Jonny Erik Gunnar Rödlund
- Date of birth: 22 December 1971 (age 54)
- Place of birth: Västerås, Sweden
- Height: 1.81 m (5 ft 11 in)
- Position: Midfielder

Youth career
- 1986: Skiljebo SK
- 1987: Västerås SK
- 1987–1988: Anderlecht
- 1988–1989: Manchester United

Senior career*
Years	Team	Apps	(Gls)
1988–1989	Manchester United	0	(0)
1989–1993	IFK Norrköping	107	(14)
1994	BK Häcken	14	(4)
1994	Västerås SK	7	(2)
1995	Degerfors IF	16	(1)
1995–1997	Braga	14	(2)
1997–1999	Västerås SK	34	(7)
1999–2001	Energie Cottbus	21	(3)
2001	Beijing Guoan	18	(1)
2002–2004	Enköpings SK	57	(5)
2004–2007	Skiljebo SK		

International career
1987–1988	Sweden U17	17	(7)
1988–1991	Sweden U19	28	(8)
1990–1993	Sweden U21/O	36	(11)
1990–1992	Sweden	2	(0)

Managerial career
- 2008: Syrianska IF Kerburan
- 2009–2010: Irsta IF
- 2010: Skiljebo SK
- * Club domestic league appearances and goals

Jonny Erik Gunnar Rödlund (born 22 December 1971) is a Swedish former professional footballer who played as a midfielder. A youth player at RSC Anderlecht and Manchester United, he went on to win Allsvenskan and Svenska Cupen with IFK Norrköping before representing teams in Portugal, Germany, and China. A full international between 1990 and 1992, he won two caps for the Sweden national team and represented his country at the 1992 Summer Olympics.

== Club career ==
Starting his footballing career with Skiljebo SK, Rödlund played youth football at RSC Anderlecht and Manchester United between 1987 and 1989 before signing with IFK Norrköping in 1989. While at Norrköping, he helped the club win the 1989 Allsvenskan and the 1990–91 Svenska Cupen titles. He also represented clubs in Portugal, Germany, and China before retiring at Skiljebo SK in 2007.

In Sweden, due to his youth career both with RSC Anderlecht and Manchester United, he is generally considered as 'the talent that never bloomed'.

== International career ==
Rödlund won two caps for the Sweden national team in 1990 and 1992. He also represented the Sweden Olympic team at the 1992 Summer Olympics in Barcelona, Spain and scored two goals before Sweden was eliminated in the quarterfinals.

== Career statistics ==
=== International ===
Appearances and goals by national team and year
National team	Year	Apps	Goals
Sweden	1990	1	0
Sweden	1991	0	0
Sweden	1992	1	0
Total		2	0

== Honours ==
IFK Norrköping

- Allsvenskan: 1989
- Svenska Cupen: 1990–91
