= 1989 Allsvenskan =

65th season of Allsvenskan

Allsvenskan
- Season: 1989
- Champions: Malmö FF (Allsvenskan champion); IFK Norrköping (Swedish champions after play-offs)
- Relegated: GIF Sundsvall; Västra Frölunda IF
- European Cup: Malmö FF
- UEFA Cup: IFK Norrköping; GAIS
- Matches: 132
- Goals: 344 (2.61 per match)
- Top goalscorer: Jan Hellström, IFK Norrköping (16)
- Average attendance: 4,211

Statistics of Allsvenskan in season 1989.

== Overview ==
The league was contested by 12 teams, with Malmö FF winning the league and IFK Norrköping winning the Swedish championship after the play-offs.

== League table ==
Pos	Team	Pld	W	D	L	GF	GA	GD	Pts	Qualification or relegation
1	Malmö FF (C)	22	12	7	3	35	11	+24	31	Allsvenskan play-offs, Qualification to European Cup first round
2	IFK Norrköping (S)	22	12	5	5	45	24	+21	29	Allsvenskan play-offs, Qualification to UEFA Cup first round
3	GAIS	22	9	8	5	31	20	+11	26	Allsvenskan play-offs, Qualification to UEFA Cup first round
4	Örebro SK	22	10	6	6	25	21	+4	26	Allsvenskan play-offs
5	Halmstads BK	22	11	3	8	30	31	−1	25	
6	Djurgårdens IF	22	9	5	8	23	24	−1	23	Qualification to Cup Winners' Cup first round (Note: Djurgården qualified for the European Cup Winners' Cup as Svenska Cupen champions 1989–90.)
7	IFK Göteborg	22	9	4	9	34	29	+5	22	
8	AIK	22	5	11	6	26	29	−3	21	
9	Örgryte IS	22	6	9	7	19	28	−9	21	
10	IK Brage	22	6	5	11	22	31	−9	17	
11	GIF Sundsvall (R)	22	4	5	13	30	40	−10	13	Relegation to Division 1
12	Västra Frölunda (R)	22	3	4	15	24	56	−32	10	Relegation to Division 1

Rules for classification: 1) points; 2) goal difference; 3) number of goals scored.
(C) Allsvenskan Champion; (S) Swedish Champion; (R) Relegated

== Results ==
Home \ Away	AIK	DIF	GAIS	GIF	HBK	IFKG	IFKN	IKB	MFF	VF	ÖSK	ÖIS
AIK		1–1	1–1	4–2	2–3	0–0	0–3	0–0	0–3	5–3	0–0	0–0
Djurgårdens IF	0–0		3–2	1–1	0–1	0–2	0–1	1–0	1–0	2–0	0–1	1–2
GAIS	2–0	0–0		1–0	4–0	2–1	1–0	1–1	1–1	1–1	0–1	0–0
GIF Sundsvall	0–1	2–2	0–1		2–2	2–1	4–0	2–3	1–1	2–1	1–2	0–1
Halmstads BK	1–2	3–1	1–0	2–1		3–1	0–1	1–0	0–2	1–2	1–2	1–1
IFK Göteborg	4–1	1–3	2–2	3–1	1–2		3–1	0–1	1–1	1–4	1–0	0–1
IFK Norrköping	2–2	4–1	3–2	0–0	1–1	1–1		3–0	0–1	7–1	2–0	4–0
IK Brage	2–0	0–2	1–3	4–1	0–1	0–2	3–4		0–1	2–1	0–3	1–1
Malmö FF	1–1	0–1	2–1	2–0	2–0	3–0	1–1	2–0		4–0	3–0	4–0
Västra Frölunda	0–5	0–1	1–1	1–3	3–4	0–5	1–4	1–3	2–0		0–0	1–2
Örebro SK	0–0	3–1	0–3	3–2	2–0	1–2	0–2	1–1	0–0	3–1		1–1
Örgryte IS	1–1	0–1	1–2	4–3	1–2	0–2	2–1	0–0	1–1	0–0	0–2	

Legend: Blue = home team win; Yellow = draw; Red = away team win.

== Allsvenskan play-offs ==
The 1989 Allsvenskan play-offs was the eighth edition of the competition. The four best placed teams from Allsvenskan qualified to the competition. League runners-up IFK Norrköping won the competition and the Swedish championship after defeating Allsvenskan champions Malmö FF. The champion was determined by a final in best of three matches in contrast to previous years.

=== Semi-finals ===
==== First leg ====
14 October 1989	GAIS	2–2	Malmö FF	Ullevi, Gothenburg

14 October 1989	Örebro	1–1	IFK Norrköping	Eyravallen, Örebro

==== Second leg ====
28 October 1989	Malmö FF	1–0 (3–2 agg.)	GAIS	Malmö Stadion, Malmö

29 October 1989	IFK Norrköping	3–0 (4–1 agg.)	Örebro	Idrottsparken, Norrköping

=== Final ===
4 November 1989	IFK Norrköping	0–2	Malmö FF	Idrottsparken, Norrköping

11 November 1989	Malmö FF	0–1	IFK Norrköping	Malmö Stadion, Malmö

15 November 1989	Malmö FF	0–0; 0–0 (aet); 3–4 (apen)	IFK Norrköping	Malmö Stadion, Malmö

IFK Norrköping won 2–1 in matches.

== Season statistics ==
=== Top scorers ===
Rank	Player	Club	Goals
1	(Sweden) Jan Hellström	IFK Norrköping	16
2	(Sweden) Leif Engkvist	Malmö FF	11
3	(Sweden) Patrik Andersson	IFK Norrköping	10
4	(Sweden) Håkan Sandberg	GIF Sundsvall	8
4	(Sweden) Peter Karlsson	Örgryte IS	8
4	(Sweden) Tommy Frejdh	Halmstads BK	8
4	(Sweden) Stefan Lindkvist	Halmstads BK	8
8	(Sweden) Håkan Lindman	Malmö FF	7
8	(Sweden) Magnus Wikström	GIF Sundsvall	7
8	(Sweden) Kennet Andersson	IFK Göteborg	7
8	(England) Simon Hunt	IK Brage	7
8	(Sweden) Dick Lidman	GIF Sundsvall	7
8	(Sweden) Kaj Eskelinen	Västra Frölunda IF	7

== Attendances ==
#	Club	Average	Highest
1	Örebro SK	5,898	7,372
2	Halmstads BK	5,255	8,815
3	GAIS	4,791	13,465
4	IFK Göteborg	4,575	12,180
5	IK Brage	4,176	5,212
6	Malmö FF	4,165	6,933
7	AIK	4,059	9,398
8	IFK Norrköping	4,000	6,302
9	Örgryte IS	3,529	8,939
10	Djurgårdens IF	3,308	9,222
11	GIF Sundsvall	2,057	3,938
12	Västra Frölunda IF	1,334	3,156
