= 1989 Tri Tournament =

Tournament details
- Host country: Denmark
- City: Copenhagen, Denmark
- Dates: 14–18 June
- Teams: 3 (from 1 confederation)
- Venue(s): 1 (in 1 host city)

Final positions
- Champions: Denmark (1st title)
- Runners-up: Sweden
- Third place: Brazil

Tournament statistics
- Matches played: 3
- Goals scored: 13 (4.33 per match)
- Top scorer(s): (Denmark) Michael Laudrup (3 goals)

The 1989 Tri Tournament (also known as 1989 DBU 100 years or DBU Centenary Tournament) was a minor international men's football tournament organised by Danish Football Association to celebrate its 100th anniversary. It was held in Copenhagen from 14 to 18 June 1989.

== Participant teams ==
The following teams participated in the tournament.

- Denmark
- Sweden
- Brazil

== Matches ==
=== Match rules ===
- 90 minutes.
- Penalty shoot-out after a draw in 90 minutes.
- Maximum of three substitutions.

=== Matches ===
Denmark beat Sweden 6–0 in the opening game on 14 June 1989. Two days later, Sweden beat Brazil 2–1 after goals by Roger Ljung and Stefan Rehn. On 18 June 1989, Denmark beat Brazil 4–0 to win the tournament.

== Winners ==
1989 Tri Tournament
champions

Denmark

== Goalscorers ==
3 goals

- (Denmark) Michael Laudrup

2 goals

- (Denmark) Lars Elstrup

1 goal

- (Sweden) Roger Ljung
- (Sweden) Stefan Rehn
- (Denmark) Flemming Povlsen
- (Denmark) Henrik Andersen
- (Denmark) Jan Bartram
- (Denmark) Morten Olsen
- (Denmark) Lars Olsen
- (Brazil) Cristóvão Borges
