= Ola Svensson (footballer, born 1964) =

Swedish footballer

Personal information
- Full name: Mats Ola Oldin Svensson
- Date of birth: 6 April 1964 (age 62)
- Position: Defender

Youth career
- Halmstads BK

Senior career*
Years	Team	Apps	(Gls)
1982–1987	Halmstads BK	62	(4)
1988–1994	IFK Göteborg	103	(12)
Total		165	(16)

International career
1984–1988	Sweden U21/O	27	(4)
- * Club domestic league appearances and goals

Mats Ola Oldin Svensson (born 6 April 1964) is a Swedish former football defender. He represented the Sweden Olympic team at the 1988 Summer Olympics.

== Honours ==
IFK Göteborg

- Allsvenskan: 1990, 1991, 1993
- Svenska Cupen: 1991

Individual

- Årets Ärkeängel: 1990
