= Roger Ljung =

Swedish footballer

Personal information
- Full name: Roger Ingemar Ljung
- Date of birth: 8 January 1966 (age 60)
- Place of birth: Lomma, Sweden
- Height: 1.88 m (6 ft 2 in)
- Position: Left back

Youth career
- Lunds BK

Senior career*
Years	Team	Apps	(Gls)
1983–1984	Lunds BK	47	(9)
1985–1989	Malmö FF	53	(4)
1989–1990	Young Boys	29	(4)
1990–1991	Zürich	21	(0)
1991–1993	Admira Wacker	90	(26)
1993–1994	Galatasaray	15	(2)
1994–1995	MSV Duisburg	13	(0)
Total		268	(45)

International career
1984–1988	Sweden U17	2	(0)
1988–1995	Sweden U19	20	(4)
1984–1988	Sweden U21/O	14	(1)
1988–1995	Sweden	59	(3)
Medal record
Sweden
FIFA World Cup
Bronze medal – third place	1994
- * Club domestic league appearances and goals

Roger Ingemar Ljung (born 8 January 1966) is a Swedish former professional footballer who played as a left back. He played for clubs in Sweden, Switzerland, Austria, Turkey, and Germany during a career that spanned between 1983 and 1995. He won 59 caps for the Sweden national team, and represented his country at the 1990 FIFA World Cup, UEFA Euro 1992, as well as the 1994 FIFA World Cup where Sweden finished third.

== Club career ==
Born in Lomma, Scania, Ljung started his football career at the age of six, with lowly Lunds BK. In 1985, he was purchased by Malmö FF, being mostly used as a substitute in his early years and being on the roster as the club won five Allsvenskan championships in a row, with the player contributing regularly in the 1987 and 1988 editions.

In the summer of 1989, Ljung transferred to BSC Young Boys in Switzerland, moving in the following season to another side in the Swiss Super League, FC Zürich. He enjoyed his best individual years in Austria with FC Admira Wacker, scoring 26 Bundesliga goals in 67 games in his first two years combined, albeit without team silverware.

In 1994, after some months in Turkey with Galatasaray SK, Ljung signed with MSV Duisburg from Germany. After appearing in less of half of the games during the campaign and also suffering relegation from the Bundesliga, he decided to retire from football at only 29.

== International career ==
Ljung played 59 international games for Sweden, scoring three goals. He was picked for the squad that appeared in the 1990 FIFA World Cup in Italy, playing only once in an eventual group stage exit.

Ljung was also selected for the team in UEFA Euro 1992, in Sweden played on home soil. His contribution to the final third-place was again minimal, as he only featured in the 2–3 semifinal loss against Germany.

In the 1994 World Cup in the United States, Ljung opened the national team's scoring account in a 2–2 group stage draw against Cameroon. This time, he was an undisputed first-choice – playing in six of seven games – and the country eventually finished third.

Ljung also participated in the 1988 Summer Olympics in Seoul, with Sweden ousted in the quarter-finals.

== Post-retirement ==
After retiring from professional football in 1995, Ljung became a sports agent. He started his own agency in Lomma, Roger Ljung Promotion AB, being at the time one of only three licensed agents in the country; newspaper Aftonbladet considered him to be Sweden's most successful agent.

Ljung's most notable client was Freddie Ljungberg, who played several years in the Premier League. He brokered his deal with Arsenal for a £3 million transfer fee, and the pair parted ways in December 2006 when the player signed with mega-agency Creative Artists.

Other players Ljung worked for included Marcus Allbäck, Patrik Andersson, Erik Edman, Andreas Isaksson, Kim Källström and Teddy Lucic.

== Career statistics ==
=== International ===
Appearances and goals by national team and year
National team	Year	Apps	Goals
Sweden	1988	7	0
Sweden	1989	9	2
Sweden	1990	6	0
Sweden	1991	7	0
Sweden	1992	6	0
Sweden	1993	9	0
Sweden	1994	11	1
Sweden	1995	4	0
Total		59	3

Scores and results list Sweden's goal tally first, score column indicates score after each Ljung goal.

List of international goals scored by Roger Ljung
No.	Date	Venue	Opponent	Score	Result	Competition	Ref.
1	7 May 1989	Råsunda Stadium, Solna, Sweden	Poland	1–0	2–1	1990 FIFA World Cup qualification	
2	16 June 1989	Parken, Copenhagen, Denmark	Brazil	2–0	2–1	1989 Tri Tournament	
3	19 June 1994	Rose Bowl, Pasadena, United States	Cameroon	1–0	2–2	1994 FIFA World Cup	
