= Michael Andersson (footballer) =

Swedish footballer and manager

Personal information
- Full name: Michael Östen Andersson
- Date of birth: 24 August 1959 (age 67)
- Place of birth: Brännkyrka, Stockholm, Sweden
- Position: Midfielder

Senior career*
Years	Team	Apps	(Gls)
–1976	Älvsjö AIK		
1976–1985	Hammarby IF	199	(36)
1986–1988	IFK Göteborg	60	(15)
1989–1991	Hammarby IF	62	(9)
1992	Nacka FF		

International career
	Sweden U16	4	(0)
	Sweden U18	14	(5)
	Sweden U21	18	(0)
	Sweden O	12	(2)
1979–1982	Sweden	8	(1)

Managerial career
- Nacka FF
- Spårvägens FF
- 1998–1999: Djurgårdens IF
- 2000–2001: Malmö FF
- * Club domestic league appearances and goals

Michael Östen Andersson (born 24 August 1959) is a Swedish former football player and manager, he previously worked as CEO of Hammarby IF.

== Playing career ==
Born in Brännkyrka, Stockholm, Andersson started his career in Älvsjö AIK before transferring to Hammarby IF in Allsvenskan. During his years at IFK Göteborg the team won Swedish Championship and the UEFA Cup in 1987. He was also capped 8 times for the Sweden national team.

== Managerial career ==
As manager Andersson has managed Djurgårdens IF and Malmö FF. He has also been Sports Director at IFK Norrköping and later CEO at Hammarby IF.

== Career statistics ==
=== International ===
Appearances and goals by national team and year

National team	Year	Apps	Goals
Sweden	1979	2	1
Sweden	1980	0	0
Sweden	1981	1	0
Sweden	1982	5	0
Total		8	1

Scores and results list Sweden's goal tally first, score column indicates score after each Andersson goal.

List of international goals scored by Michael Andersson
No.	Date	Venue	Opponent	Score	Result	Competition	Ref.
1	14 November 1979	Merdeka Stadium, Kuala Lumpur, Malaysia	Malaysia	3–1	3–1	Friendly	

== Honours ==
IFK Göteborg

- Swedish Champion: 1987
- UEFA Cup: 1986–87
