= Göran Arnberg =

Swedish footballer

Personal information
- Full name: Lars-Göran Mikael Arnberg
- Date of birth: 1 August 1957 (age 69)
- Place of birth: Borlänge, Sweden
- Height: 1.90 m (6 ft 3 in)
- Position: Defender

Senior career*
Years	Team	Apps	(Gls)
1976–1977	Kvarnsvedens IK		
1977–1993	IK Brage		

International career
1986–1988	Sweden U21/Sweden O	21	(0)
1981	Sweden	1	(0)
- * Club domestic league appearances and goals

Lars-Göran Mikael Arnberg (born 1 August 1957) is a Swedish former footballer who played as a defender. He played a total of 536 games for IK Brage between 1977 and 1993. He served as the captain for the Sweden Olympic team at the 1988 Summer Olympics. He won one cap for the Sweden national team.
