= Duan Ju =

Chinese football Midfielder

Duan Ju 段举
Personal information
- Full name: Duan Ju
- Date of birth: 31 August 1963 (age 63)
- Place of birth: Tianjin, China
- Height: 1.78 m (5 ft 10 in)
- Position: Midfielder

Youth career
- 1980–1983: Tianjin Team 2

Senior career*
Years	Team	Apps	(Gls)
1984–1991	Tianjin team		
1992–1993	NKK SC		

International career
1985–1990	China	32	(0)
Medal record
Representing China
Men's football
AFC Youth Championship
Silver medal – second place	1982 Bangkok	Team
- * Club domestic league appearances and goals

Duan Ju (Chinese: 段举; born 31 August 1963) is a Chinese football midfielder who played for China in the 1988 Asian Cup.

== Playing career ==
Duan Ju was born in Tianjin. At the age of 17, he was called up to China youth football team. Duan Ju played for Tianjin football Team 2 from 1980 to 1983. From 1984 to 1991, Duan Ju played for Tianjin team. In 1988, Duan Ju played for China in the 1988 Asian Cup and football match at the 1988 Olympic Games. In 1990, China lost to Thailand in football match at the 1990 Asian Games. The coach of China, Gao Fengwen quit office， then Duan Ju quit the China national team and returned to Tianjin. in 1992, Duan Ju had gone to Japan and played for NKK SC. In 1993, Duan Ju retired in Japan and returned to China. In 1995, Duan Ju played for Tianjin Yuancheng football club, in the same year， Duan Ju retired again.

== Career statistics ==
=== International statistics ===
Year	Competition	Apps	Goal
1985–1989	Friendly	5	0
1986–1990	Asian Games	5	0
1988	AFC Asian Cup qualifiers	3	0
1988	Asian Cup	6	0
1989	FIFA World Cup qualification	10	0
1990	Dynasty Cup	2	0
Total		32	0
