= Sven Andersson (footballer, born 1963) =

Swedish footballer

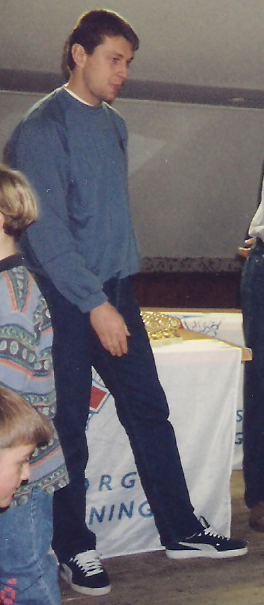
- Andersson in 1995, during an award ceremony for Helsingborgs IF's youth players.

Personal information
- Full name: Sven Tommy Andersson
- Date of birth: 6 October 1963 (age 63)
- Place of birth: Strömstad, Sweden
- Height: 1.83 m (6 ft 0 in)
- Position: Goalkeeper

Senior career*
Years	Team	Apps	(Gls)
1980–1991	Örgryte IS	247	(0)
1992	IFK Strömstad	28	(0)
1993–2001	Helsingborgs IF	233	(0)
2001–2002	West Ham United	0	(0)
Total		508	(0)

International career
1979–1980	Sweden U16	5	(0)
1980–1982	Sweden U18	22	(0)
1981–1986	Sweden U21	30	(0)
1986–1988	Sweden Olympic	22	(0)
1990	Sweden	1	(0)
- * Club domestic league appearances and goals

Sven Tommy Andersson (born 6 October 1963) is a Swedish former professional footballer who played as a goalkeeper. Beginning his career with Örgryte IS in 1980, he went on to represent IFK Strömstad and Helsingborgs IF before retiring at West Ham United in 2002. A full international for Sweden, he won one cap in 1990 and was a part of his country's 1990 FIFA World Cup squad. He also represented the Sweden Olympic team at the 1988 Summer Olympics.

== Playing career ==
Born in Strömstad near the Norwegian border, he began his professional career in Örgryte IS, a club with which he won the Allsvenskan championship in 1985. He got 1 cap for Sweden, and was called up as a reserve in the Swedish squad for the 1990 FIFA World Cup in Italy.

In 1993, after having retired from professional football, he was persuaded by Helsingborgs IF to make his comeback. Between 1993 and 2001 he played 233 consecutive Allsvenskan matches, and a total of 268 matches for the club. He was suspended from what was planned to be his last match for HIF due to a red card in his 233rd match.

In 2000, he earned his nickname San Siro-Sven with a last-minute penalty save against Inter Milan. In a 2000–01 UEFA Champions League qualifier, Helsingborgs were leading 1–0 on aggregate from the first leg with the second leg delicately poised at 0–0. In the final minute Inter were awarded a penalty but Alvaro Recoba saw his effort saved by Andersson, and Helsingborgs qualified at Inter's expense.

In November 2001 he joined Premier League side West Ham United, but left the following summer having not made an appearance for the club.

== Post-playing career ==
Today Sven Andersson is the goalkeepers' coach of Helsingborgs IF.

== Career statistics ==
=== International ===
Appearances and goals by national team and year
National team	Year	Apps	Goals
Sweden	1990	1	0
Total		1	0
