= Bengt Nilsson =

Bengt Nilsson may refer to:

- Bengt Nilsson (actor) (born 1967), Swedish actor
- Bengt Nilsson (athlete) (1934–2018), Swedish former athlete
- Bengt Nilsson (rower) (born 1954), Swedish Olympic rower
