= Tang Yaodong =

Chinese footballer and manager

Tang Yaodong 唐尧东
Personal information
- Full name: Tang Yaodong
- Date of birth: 17 February 1962 (age 64)
- Place of birth: Shenyang, Liaoning, China
- Height: 1.74 m (5 ft 9 in)
- Position: Centre forward

Youth career
- 1976–1982: Liaoning team

Senior career*
Years	Team	Apps	(Gls)
1983–1991	Liaoning team	?	(?)
1992	Otsuka Pharmaceutical	?	(?)
1993–1995	Liaoning FC	?	(?)

International career
1985–1990	China	37	(4)

Managerial career
- 1996–2001: Liaoning Liaoqing
- 2002: Liaoning Xingguang
- 2005: Liaoning FC (assistant)
- 2005–2007: Liaoning FC
- 2008: Henan Jianye (assistant)
- 2008–2010: Henan Jianye
- 2012: Chongqing Lifan
- 2013–2014: Henan Jianye
- 2016: Shenzhen FC
- 2017: Wuhan Zall
Medal record
Men's football
Representing China
AFC Asian Cup
Silver medal – second place	1984 Singapore	Team
- * Club domestic league appearances and goals

Tang Yaodong (Chinese: 唐尧东; born 17 February 1962 in Shenyang, China) is a Chinese football manager and former Chinese international footballer. He mainly played as a centre forward for Liaoning FC.

== Playing career ==
=== Club career ===
Tang Yaodong began his football career playing for his hometown football club Liaoning's youth team and would later graduate to the senior team in the 1983 league season. After several seasons he would later rise to prominence when he would help them win the 1985 league title. This was to be the first of many trophies that were to follow and Tang Yaodong would play an integral part in a dominant Liaoning team that also saw them win the 1990 Asian Club Championship. Despite winning another league title he would transfer to a second tier Japanese club Otsuka Pharmaceutical in the 1992 league season. After only one season with them he would return to Liaoning FC until he retired.

=== International career ===
Tang Yaodong would make his senior debut in a friendly against Korea DPR on 24 August 1986, in a 0–0 draw. Under head coach Gao Fengwen he would quickly become an integral member of the Chinese team and score his first goal against Singapore in a friendly on 1 September 1986, in a 3–0 win. Tang played all three games for China at the 1988 Olympics in Seoul, Korea as they were eliminated in the first round. He appeared also in the 1988 AFC Asian Cup and help China come 4th within the tournament, however when China were unable to qualify for the 1990 FIFA World Cup Tang Yaodong's appearances became limited and effectively ended once Gao Fengwen left the Chinese team.

== International goals ==
No.	Date	Venue	Opponent	Score	Result	Competition
1.	28 February 1989	National Stadium, Bangkok, Thailand	Thailand	1–0	3–0	1990 FIFA World Cup qualification
2.	17 October 1989	National Stadium, Kallang, Singapore	United Arab Emirates	1–0	1–2	1990 FIFA World Cup qualification

== Management career ==
=== Liaoning Liaoqing and Liaoning Xingguang ===
After he retired he would take the position of head coach for the Liaoning Liaoqing, the youth team of Liaoning FC, in 1996 until 2001 when the youth team were allowed to participate in the third-tier China League Two. However, in 2002, they're forbidden to play in the second-tier Jia B after their promotion to it, and as a result they transferred their place in Jia B to a newly created club named Liaoning Xingguang, which Tang also moved to. He was allowed to stay with the team throughout the 2002 league season to help the team in their transition within the professional league system and took them to a respectable 6th within the league. The 2003 league season would see the team sold off to SVT Group and move to Nanjing, Tang Yaodong did not follow them and remained in Liaoning with Liaoning FC where he was offered an assistant position within the team.

=== Liaoning FC ===
After spending a short period as an assistant he was promoted to head coach after Liaoning's poor start to the 2005 Chinese Super League season. In his first season at Liaoning he was unable to achieve much success except to stabilize the club and lead them to midtable in his first attempt at managing a top-flight team. Liaoning's relatively poor performance even saw Tang Yaodong willing to step down before the beginning of the 2006 Chinese Super League season, however the club stood by him throughout the season even though results did not improve throughout the season. This would continue once more throughout the 2007 Chinese Super League season, however Liaoning lost patience at the end the season and with Tang Yaodong's contract up for renewal they decided not to renew it.

=== Henan Jianye ===
On 7 January 2008, new head coach Jia Xiuquan brought in Tang Yaodong as his assistant for ambitious Chinese Super League club Henan Construction, however their reign was considered unsuccessful and Jia Xiuquan resigned on 15 June while Tang Yaodong left soon after. When Portuguese Head coach Acácio Casimiro was sacked during the 2008 league season Tang Yaodong was brought back into the club as a short-term solution to help salvage the season. At the beginning of the 2009 league season he remained as their manager and surprisingly the team's form dramatically improved. His reign would see Henan achieve their best ever league position of third and he would personally win the Coach of the year award.

=== Chongqing Lifan ===
On 19 April 2012, Tang was appointed as the new manager of China League One side Chongqing Lifan, replacing Lawrie McKinna who was sacked from the club five days before.

== Honours ==
=== Player ===
- Chinese Jia-A League: 1985, 1987, 1988, 1990, 1991
- Chinese FA Cup: 1986
- Asian Club Championship: 1990

=== Manager ===
- Chinese Super League: 2009 3rd Place
