= Stefan Lindqvist =

Swedish footballer (1967-2020)

Personal information
- Date of birth: 18 March 1967
- Place of birth: Halmstad, Sweden
- Date of death: 1 March 2020 (aged 52)
- Place of death: Särö, Sweden
- Position: Midfielder

Senior career*
Years	Team	Apps	(Gls)
1986–1990	Halmstad	80	(11)
1990–1991	Neuchâtel Xamax	9	(0)
1991–1997	IFK Göteborg	172	(22)
1997	Dalian Wanda FC		
1997–1998	Motherwell	6	(1)
1997–1998	Strømsgodset IF	7	(1)
1998–1999	IFK Göteborg	0	(0)

International career^{‡}
1989	Sweden U21	1	(0)
1989–1990	Sweden	5	(1)
- * Club domestic league appearances and goals as of 26 October 2017 (UTC) ‡ National team caps and goals as of 26 October (UTC)

Stefan Lindqvist (18 March 1967 – 1 March 2020) was a Swedish professional footballer who played as a midfielder. During his club career, Lindqvist played for Halmstad, Neuchâtel Xamax, IFK Göteborg, Motherwell and Strømsgodset IF. He made five appearances for the Sweden national team between 1989 and 1990, scoring one goal.

== Club career ==
Lindqvist played professional football in Sweden, Switzerland, China, and Scotland, but is mostly remembered for his time with IFK Göteborg.

Lindqvist won five Allsvenskan titles with IFK Göteborg, and played every minute of Göteborg's 1994–95 UEFA Champions League campaign which saw Göteborg win their group ahead of FC Barcelona, Manchester United, and Galatasaray before being eliminated by Bayern München in the quarter finals on away goals.

== International career ==
On 6 May 1989 Lindqvist made his Sweden U21 debut in a 1990 UEFA European Under-21 qualifying game against Poland which Sweden won 4-0.

On 16 August 1989, Lindqvist made his senior debut for Sweden in a friendly game against France, in which he also scored his first and only international goal. On 8 October 1989 he made his competitive senior debut for Sweden in a 1990 FIFA World Cup qualifying game against Albania, in which Sweden won 3-1.

== Personal life ==
He died on 1 March 2020 after a more than 10 year long battle with ALS.

== Career statistics ==
=== International ===
Appearances and goals by national team and year
National team	Year	Apps	Goals
Sweden	1989	3	1
Sweden	1990	2	0
Total		5	1

Scores and results list Sweden's goal tally first, score column indicates score after each Lindqvist goal.

List of international goals scored by Stefan Lindqvist
No.	Date	Venue	Opponent	Score	Result	Competition	Ref.
1	16 August 1989	Malmö Stadium, Malmö, Sweden	France	2–2	2–4	Friendly	

== Honours ==
Neuchâtel Xamax

- Swiss Super Cup: 1990

IFK Göteborg

- Allsvenskan: 1991, 1993, 1994, 1995, 1996
- Svenska Cupen: 1991

Individual

- Årets Ärkeängel: 1996
