= Joakim Nilsson (footballer, born 1966) =

Swedish footballer

Personal information
- Full name: Hans Peter Joakim Nilsson
- Date of birth: 31 March 1966 (age 60)
- Place of birth: Landskrona, Sweden
- Height: 1.83 m (6 ft 0 in)
- Position: Midfielder

Senior career*
Years	Team	Apps	(Gls)
1985–1986	Landskrona BoIS		
1986–1990	Malmö FF	60	(3)
1990–1993	Sporting de Gijón	49	(0)
1993–1995	Landskrona BoIS	31	(11)

International career
1987–1988	Sweden U21/O	13	(0)
1988–1992	Sweden	27	(1)
- * Club domestic league appearances and goals

Hans Peter Joakim Nilsson (born 31 March 1966) is a Swedish former professional footballer who played as a midfielder. He played for Landskrona BoIS and Malmö FF in his native Sweden, and Sporting de Gijón in Spain during a career that spanned between 1985 and 1995. He appeared for the Sweden national team a total of 27 times, and participated in the 1990 FIFA World Cup in Italy as well as UEFA Euro 1992. He represented Sweden at the 1988 Summer Olympics.

== Career statistics ==
=== International ===
Appearances and goals by national team and year
National team	Year	Apps	Goals
Sweden	1988	7	1
Sweden	1989	8	0
Sweden	1990	9	0
Sweden	1991	1	0
Sweden	1992	2	0
Total		27	1

Scores and results list Sweden's goal tally first, score column indicates score after each Nilsson goal.

List of international goals scored by Joakim Nilsson
No.	Date	Venue	Opponent	Score	Result	Competition	Ref.
1	1 June 1988	El Helmantico, Villares de la Reina, Spain	Spain	1–1	3–1	Friendly	
