= Peter Lönn =

Swedish footballer (born 1961)

Personal information
- Full name: Peter Roland Mikael Lönn
- Date of birth: 13 July 1961 (age 65)
- Place of birth: Norrköping, Sweden
- Position: Defender

Senior career*
Years	Team	Apps	(Gls)
1980–1989	IFK Norrköping	147	(24)
1989–1991	Neuchatel Xamax	54	(7)
1992	IFK Norrköping	22	(2)
Total		223	(33)

International career
1984–1988	Sweden U21/O	34	(6)
1987–1989	Sweden	7	(0)
- * Club domestic league appearances and goals

Peter Roland Mikael Lönn (born 13 July 1961) is a Swedish former footballer who played as a defender. He played for IFK Norrköping and Neuchâtel Xamax FCS.

He won seven caps for the Sweden national team and represented the Sweden Olympic football team at the 1988 Summer Olympics where he scored two goals. After the season 1992 he ended his career after his operation of a knee injury.
