= Hachemi Ouahchi =

Tunisian footballer

Personal information
- Date of birth: 25 December 1960 (age 65)
- Place of birth: Sousse
- Position: Defender

International career
Years	Team	Apps	(Gls)
- Tunisia

Hachemi Ouahchi (born 25 December 1960) is a Tunisian former footballer who played as a defender for the Tunisia national team. He competed in the men's tournament at the 1988 Summer Olympics.
