= Wolfgang Funkel =

German former footballer (born 1958)

Personal information
- Full name: Wolfgang Funkel
- Date of birth: 10 August 1958 (age 68)
- Place of birth: Neuss, West Germany
- Height: 1.92 m (6 ft 4 in)
- Position: Defender

Youth career
- VfR Neuss

Senior career*
Years	Team	Apps	(Gls)
1977–1982	VfR Neuss		
1982–1983	Viktoria Goch		
1983–1984	Rot-Weiß Oberhausen	37	(7)
1984–1991	Bayer Uerdingen	210	(31)
1991–1995	1. FC Kaiserslautern	95	(10)
Total		342	(48)

International career
1985–1986	West Germany U-21	7	(1)
1986	West Germany	2	(0)
1987–1988	West Germany Olympic	17	(2)

Managerial career
- 1996–1998: VfR Neuss
- 1998–2001: Rot-Weiß Oberhausen (assistant coach)
- 2001–2005: Hansa Rostock (assistant coach)
- 2005: Hansa Rostock (caretaker coach)
- 2005–2008: 1. FC Kaiserslautern (assistant coach)
- 2007: 1. FC Kaiserslautern (caretaker coach)
Medal record
Representing West Germany
Men's Football
Bronze medal – third place	1988 Seoul	Team competition
- * Club domestic league appearances and goals

Wolfgang Funkel (born 10 August 1958) is a German former footballer.

The defender played over 300 matches in the (West) German top-flight. In 1986 Funkel won two caps for the West Germany national team.

He is the brother of Friedhelm Funkel.

== Honours ==
Bayer Uerdingen

- DFB-Pokal: 1984–85

Kaiserslautern

- DFL-Supercup: 1991
