= Uwe Kamps =

German footballer (born 1964)

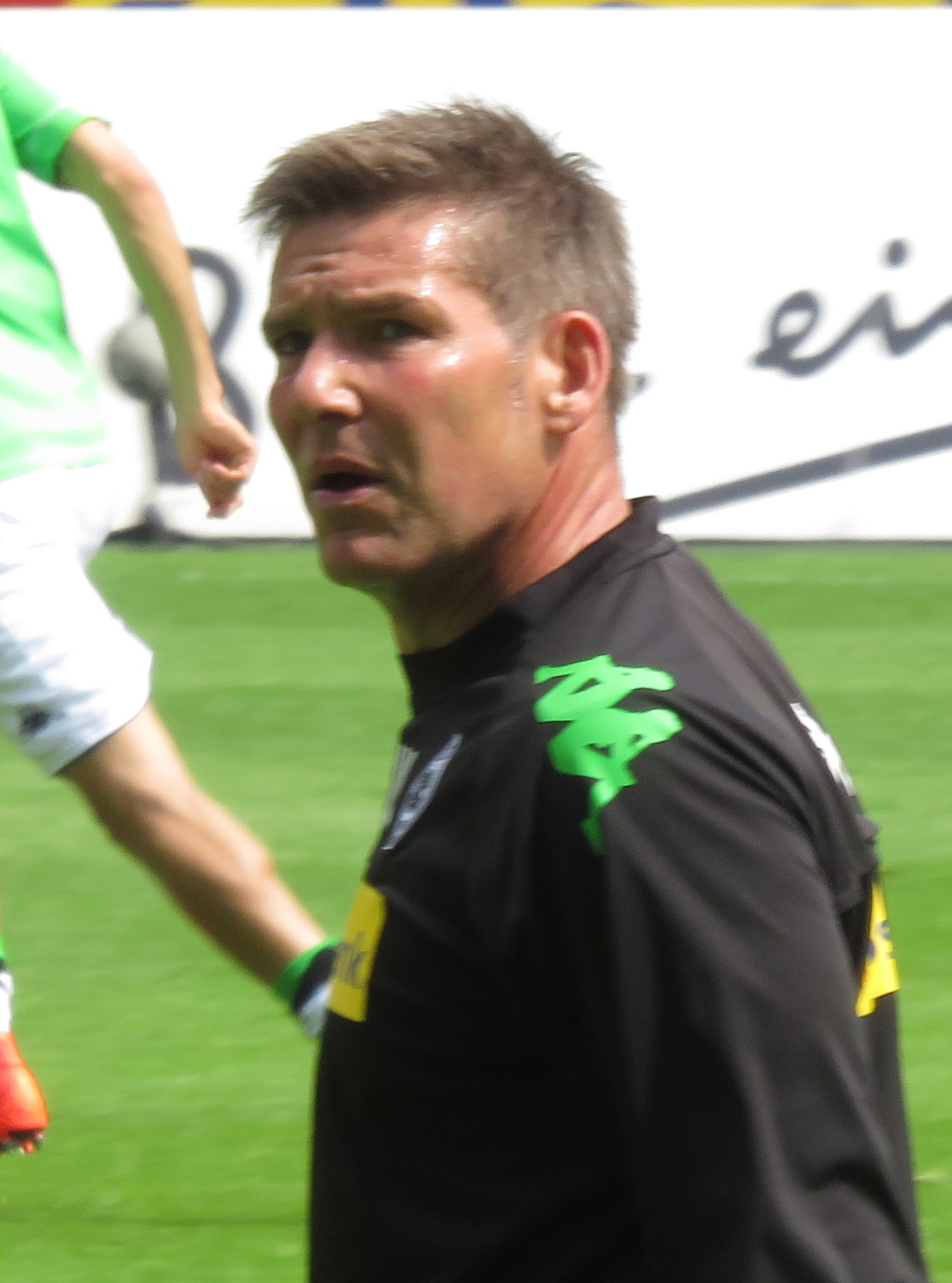
- Kamps in 2015

Personal information
- Date of birth: 12 June 1964 (age 62)
- Place of birth: Düsseldorf, West Germany
- Height: 1.80 m (5 ft 11 in)
- Position: Goalkeeper

Youth career
- SV Wersten 04
- BV 04 Düsseldorf

Senior career*
Years	Team	Apps	(Gls)
1982–2004	Borussia M'gladbach	457	(0)
Medal record
Representing West Germany
Men's Football
Bronze medal – third place	1988 Seoul	Team competition
- * Club domestic league appearances and goals

Uwe Kamps (born 12 June 1964) is a German former professional footballer who played as a goalkeeper.

== Club career ==
Born in Düsseldorf, Kamps joined Borussia Mönchengladbach from amateur club BV 04 Düsseldorf. On 12 March 1983, he made his debut with the first team, starting in a 3–0 home win against Arminia Bielefeld, and finished his debut season in the Bundesliga with 12 games and 20 goals conceded, including four in the final round, a 6–4 success at Borussia Dortmund.

After three additional campaigns with only three matches combined, Kamps became the side's undisputed starter, going on to amass 390 top division games. In 1991–92 he lost the German Cup final to Hannover 96, after a legendary semifinal against Bayer Leverkusen where he saved all four penalties from the opposition (Martin Kree, Ioan Lupescu, Heiko Herrlich and Jorginho); he would start and win the same competition in 1995, after a 3–0 final win over VfL Wolfsburg.

Kamps remained in Borussia's books until the end of 2003–04. He was influential in its 2001 return to the top level after two years of absence, appearing in 67 out of 68 matches in the second division over the two years. However, the signing of Swiss international Jörg Stiel relegated him to the bench for the following three seasons, with his only appearance coming when he was brought on as a substitute on the occasion of the club's final league match at the Bökelbergstadion in May 2004. It was his 390th Bundesliga appearance.

Subsequently, Kamps continued working with his only club, as a goalkeeper coach.

== Honours ==
Borussia Mönchengladbach

- DFB-Pokal: 1994–95; runner-up 1983–84, 1991–92

West Germany

- Summer Olympic Games bronze medal: 1988

== See also ==
- List of one-club men
