= Jan Hellström =

Swedish footballer (born 1960)

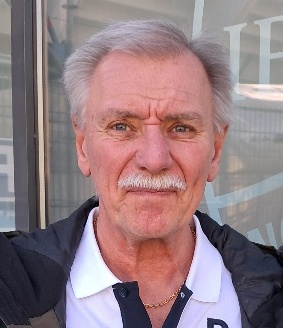

Personal information
- Full name: Jan Erik Hellström
- Date of birth: February 21, 1960 (age 66)
- Place of birth: Söderköping, Sweden
- Height: 1.78 m (5 ft 10 in)
- Position: Striker

Youth career
- Örtomta GoIS
- 1973–1978: IF SAAB

Senior career*
Years	Team	Apps	(Gls)
1978–1980	IF Saab	40	(33)
1981–1984	Norrköping	80	(36)
1985–1987	Örgryte	47	(20)
1988–1994	Norrköping	185	(80)
1995–1996	Hagahöjden	15	(8)
1998–1999	Åby IF	14	(?)

International career
1982–1988	Sweden U21/O	15	(8)
1986–1989	Sweden	6	(0)
- * Club domestic league appearances and goals

Jan Erik "Janne" Hellström (born February 21, 1960) is a Swedish former footballer who played as a striker, most notably for IFK Norrköping. He won six caps for the Sweden national team between 1986 and 1989 and represented the Sweden Olympic team at the 1988 Summer Olympics.

== Career ==
Hellström played Swedish top league football for IFK Norrköping (247 games, 102 goals) and Örgryte IS. He started his career in Örtomta GoIS as a youth, then moved, still in his teens, to IF Saab from Linköping.

In 1977, his first season as a senior, in the second division, Hellström scored three goals in five games. Saab was relegated and, in the following year, he had his real breakthrough as a senior playing, netting 25 goals. His achievements were soon recognised by clubs in the top level and, in 1981, he signed for Norrköping. Local rivals Åtvidabergs FF had tried to sign him since 1980, but nothing ever came of it.

After the season 1984 and numerous goals for Norrköping, Hellström suddenly left for Örgryte IS from Gothenburg. He commented the move in an interview to Norrköping's fansite gopeking.net:

"My decision to move was based on several factors. I did not feel the club was trying to invest in anything, the club only played the games, did not sign players and did not show any aspiration that they wanted anything. In addition, the football the coach at the time, Lars-Göran Qwist supported, was not a football I could support."

In 1988, even though his life was well both personally and at work, he eventually agreed on a return to Norrköping, with Tommy Wisell, manager/director at the club, playing an active role in convincing the player. Also during that year, Hellström had a breakthrough in his international career when he played for Sweden at the Seoul Olympic Games; he finished the tournament as the second best goalscorer in the group play with three goals, only behind Brazil's Romário (four). Sweden got knocked out of the tournament in the quarterfinal 1–2 defeat against Italy. His total record for the Olympics (including the qualifiers) was eight goals in 15 games.

In the following year, 1989, Hellström was crowned the league's topscorer for the first and only time in his career, with 16 goals, as IFK Norrköping won the Swedish national championship by defeating Malmö FF in the final games. However, a severe leg injury in left him out of action for a lengthy period, although he continued to play with the club until 1994.

Subsequently, Hellström left for Hagahöjdens BK in the Swedish fourth division, where he remained until 1996. After two short half-season comebacks for Åby IF (in Norrköping), he ended his active career in 1999.

During his career, he was linked to Real Zaragoza (Spain) and Iraklis (Greece) but remained faithful to Norrköping. After retiring, Hellström (considered one of the best players in the club's history) joined the board of directors.
