= Haithem Abid =

Tunisian footballer

Personal information
- Nationality: Tunisian
- Born: 22 September 1965 (age 59)
- Height: 1.79 m (5 ft 10 in)
- Weight: 72 kg (159 lb)

Sport
- Sport: Football

Haithem Abid (born 22 September 1965) is a Tunisian footballer who played for the Tunisia national team as a midfielder. He competed in the 1988 Summer Olympics.
