= Mourad Ranene =

Tunisian footballer

Personal information
- Date of birth: 6 January 1967 (age 59)
- Position: Forward

International career
Years	Team	Apps	(Gls)
- Tunisia

Mourad Ranene (born 6 January 1967) is a Tunisian former footballer who played for the national team as a forward. He competed in the men's tournament at the 1988 Summer Olympics.
