= Anders Palmér =

Swedish footballer (born 1960)

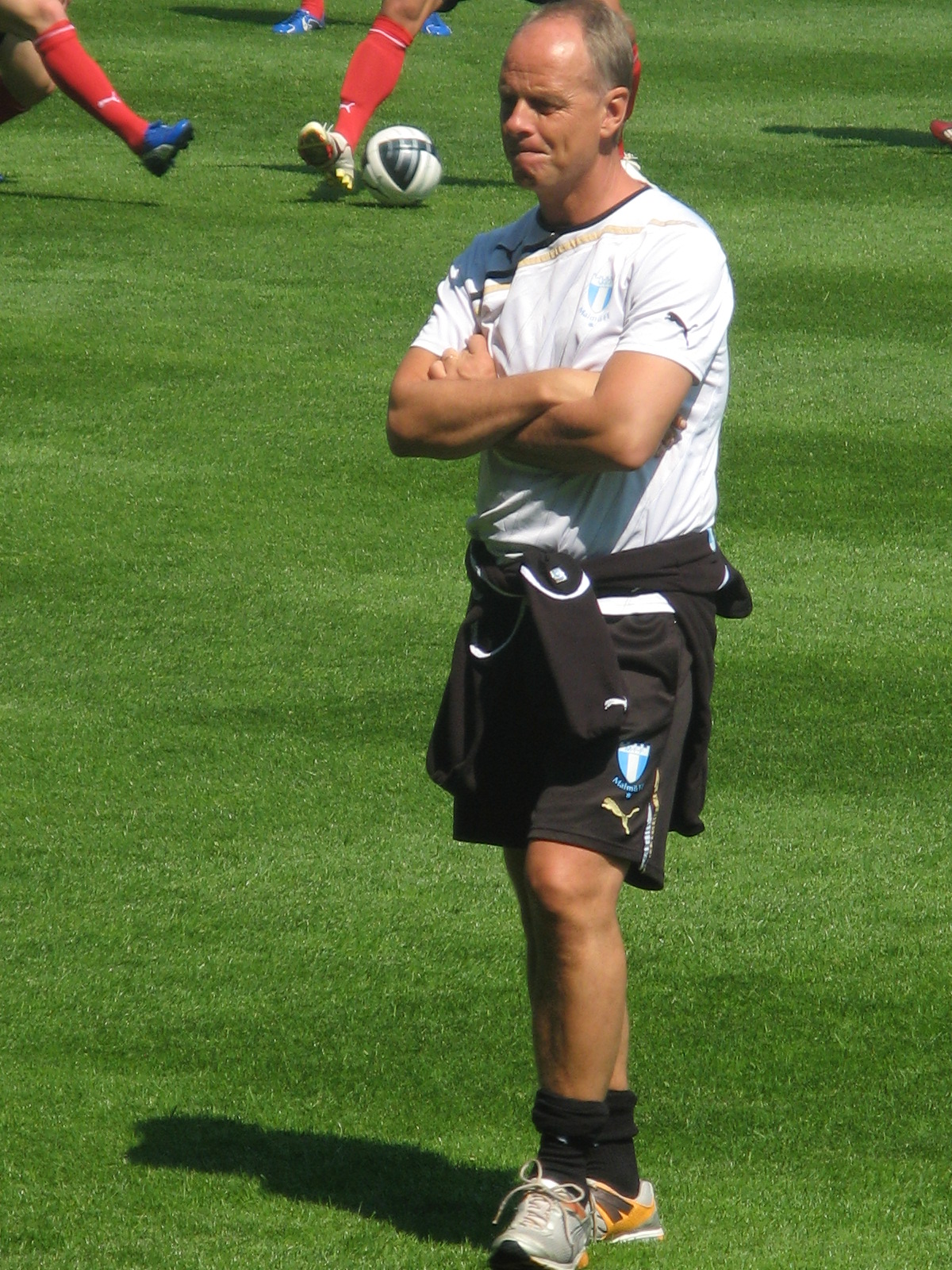

Personal information
- Full name: Anders Mikael Palmér
- Date of birth: 24 April 1960 (age 66)
- Place of birth: Sweden
- Position: Midfielder

Youth career
- 1970–1979: Malmö FF

Senior career*
Years	Team	Apps	(Gls)
1980–1981	Malmö FF		
1981–1982	→ Vancouver Whitecaps (loan)		
1982–1989	Malmö FF		
1989–?	Trelleborgs FF		
?–2002	Oxie		
2004–2007	MF Pelister		

International career
1983–1987	Sweden	12	(0)

Managerial career
- 2002–2003: Malmö FF (Assistant manager)
- 2004: Trelleborgs FF (Assistant manager)
- 2006–2009: MF Pelister
- 2011: Malmö FF (Assistant manager)
- * Club domestic league appearances and goals

Anders Mikael Palmér (born 24 April 1960) is a Swedish former footballer who played as a midfielder.

During his career he played for Malmö FF and Vancouver Whitecaps. He earned 12 caps for the Sweden men's national football team between 1983 and 1987. Today he is a youth coach at Malmö FF. He also competed in the men's tournament at the 1988 Summer Olympics.

== Personal life ==
Palmér is the son of former professional footballer Karl-Erik Palmér who scored three goals for Sweden at the 1950 FIFA World Cup where Sweden finished third.

== Honours ==
Malmö FF

- Swedish Champion: 1986, 1988
