= Leif Engqvist =

Swedish footballer and manager

Personal information
- Full name: Leif Håkan Ingemar Engqvist
- Date of birth: 30 July 1962 (age 64)
- Place of birth: Malmö, Sweden
- Height: 1.83 m (6 ft 0 in)
- Position: Midfielder

Senior career*
Years	Team	Apps	(Gls)
1983–1984	Lunds BK		
1985–1991	Malmö FF	124	(25)
1992–1994	Trelleborgs FF	77	(11)
Total		201	(36)

International career
1987–1988	Sweden U21/O	14	(3)
1986–1990	Sweden	18	(2)

Managerial career
- 2002–2013: Malmö FF (team leader)
- 2013: Lunds BK
- * Club domestic league appearances and goals

Leif Håkan Ingemar Engqvist (born 30 July 1962) is a Swedish former footballer who played as a midfielder. During his career he played for Lunds BK, Malmö FF and Trelleborgs FF. He earned 18 caps for the Sweden men's national football team, and participated in the 1990 FIFA World Cup. He also took part in the 1988 Summer Olympics.

== Career statistics ==
=== International ===
Appearances and goals by national team and year
National team	Year	Apps	Goals
Sweden	1986	5	0
Sweden	1987	0	0
Sweden	1988	3	0
Sweden	1989	3	1
Sweden	1990	7	1
Total		18	2

Scores and results list Sweden's goal tally first, score column indicates score after each Engqvist goal.

List of international goals scored by Leif Engqvist
No.	Date	Venue	Opponent	Score	Result	Competition	Ref.
1	10 October 1989	Råsunda Stadium, Solna, Sweden	Albania	3–1	3–1	1990 FIFA World Cup qualifier	
2	22 August 1990	Stavanger Stadium, Stavanger, Norway	Norway	1–1	2–1	Friendly	
