= Imad Mizouri =

Tunisian footballer

Personal information
- Date of birth: 20 October 1966 (age 60)

International career
Years	Team	Apps	(Gls)
1986–1994	Tunisia	50	(0)

Imad Mizouri (born 20 October 1966) is a Tunisian footballer who played for the Tunisia national team. He competed in the men's tournament at the 1988 Summer Olympics.
