= Abderrazak Chahat =

Tunisian footballer

Personal information
- Date of birth: 14 January 1962 (age 64)
- Position: Defender

International career
| Years | Team | Apps | (Gls) |
- Tunisia

Abderrazak Chahat (born 14 January 1962) is a Tunisian former footballer who played for the Tunisia national team as a defender. He competed in the men's tournament at the 1988 Summer Olympics.
