= Kong Guoxian =

Chinese footballer (born 1965)

Personal information
- Date of birth: 6 September 1965 (age 61)
- Place of birth: Guangzhou, Guangdong, China
- Height: 1.82 m (6 ft 0 in)
- Position: Goalkeeper

Senior career*
Years	Team	Apps	(Gls)
1985–1993	Guangzhou		
1994–1997	Guangzhou Matsunichi		
1998–1999	Guangzhou Apollo		

International career
1988	China	1	(0)

Managerial career
- 1999–2000: Guangzhou Apollo (Assistant)
- * Club domestic league appearances and goals

Kong Guoxian (Chinese: 孔国贤; pinyin: Kǒng Guóxián; Mandarin pronunciation: [kʰʊ̀ŋ kwǒ ɕjɛ̌n]; born 6 September 1965) is a Chinese former football goalkeeper who played for Guangzhou Apollo throughout his entire career while internationally he represented China in the 1988 Olympics and 1988 Asian Cup. After retiring he would go into goalkeeping coaching before becoming a football ambassador to Guangzhou in 2002 while also going on to become a private businessman.

== Biography ==
Kong Guoxian started his football career playing for the Guangzhou youth team before being promoted to the senior team where he was called up to the squad that won the football at the 1987 National Games of China. After the tournament win Kong would soon be called up to squad that took part in the 1988 Olympics and the 1988 Asian Cup where he was the second choice goalkeeper in both competitions. When he returned to club football he was unable to replicate the performances that saw him first called up to the national team and he would be part of the team that was relegated at the end of the 1989 league season. His time within the second tier did not last long and after only one season Guangzhou quickly won back promotion and for the next several seasons Kong would ensure that the club remained in the top tier. By 1999 Kong would retire and take up the goalkeeping coaching position before becoming a football ambassador to Guangzhou in 2002 while also going on to become a private businessman and football pundit.
