= Wolfram Wuttke =

German footballer (1961–2015)

Personal information
- Date of birth: 17 November 1961
- Place of birth: Castrop-Rauxel, West Germany
- Date of death: 1 March 2015 (aged 53)
- Place of death: Lünen, Germany
- Height: 1.72 m (5 ft 8 in)
- Position: Midfielder

Youth career
- 1967–1976: SG Castrop
- 1976–1978: Schalke 04

Senior career*
Years	Team	Apps	(Gls)
1979–1981	Schalke 04	32	(3)
1981–1982	Borussia Mönchengladbach	58	(9)
1982–1983	Schalke 04	16	(7)
1983–1985	Hamburger SV	58	(15)
1985–1990	1. FC Kaiserslautern	112	(32)
1990–1992	Espanyol	51	(15)
1992–1993	1. FC Saarbrücken	23	(0)
Total		350	(72)

International career
1980–1982	West Germany U-21	7	(1)
1986–1988	West Germany	4	(1)
1987–1988	West Germany Olympic	11	(6)

Managerial career
- 1994: TuS Haltern
- 2008: TSV Crailsheim
Medal record
Representing West Germany
Men's Football
Bronze medal – third place	1988 Seoul	Team competition
- * Club domestic league appearances and goals

Wolfram Wuttke (17 November 1961 – 1 March 2015) was a German professional footballer who played as a midfielder.

== Club career ==
Wuttke made his Bundesliga debut in October 1979 for Schalke 04 in a 3–0 win against Werder Bremen. From 1981 to 1982, he played one and a half seasons for Borussia Mönchengladbach before returning to Schalke. In summer 1983, he moved to Hamburger SV. Günther Netzer, then Hamburg's sporting director, called him one of the greatest German football talents of all times. After several disputes, Ernst Happel, Hamburg's manager, threw him out of the team in September 1985. After that, he played nearly four seasons for 1. FC Kaiserslautern. Kaiserslautern canceled his contract in 1990 due to "unprofessional behaviour" and so he joined RCD Espanyol. In 1992, he returned to the Bundesliga and played for 1. FC Saarbrücken but he had to end his career at the age of 31 due to a fracture of the shoulder. He appeared in nearly 300 (West) German top-flight matches.

== International career ==
His good performance in the Bundesliga earned him four caps in the West Germany national team and he was part of West Germany's squad at the UEFA Euro 1988 and the West German team that won the bronze medal at the 1988 Summer Olympics.

== Death ==
On 1 March 2015, he died due to a multisystem organ failure caused by cirrhosis.

== Honours ==
1. FC Kaiserslautern

- DFB-Pokal: 1989–90

Germany U21

- UEFA Under-21 Championship: runner-up 1982
- Olympics: Bronze Medal 1988
