= Håkan Lindman =

Swedish footballer

Personal information
- Full name: Fred Håkan Ingvar Lindman
- Date of birth: 27 November 1961 (age 64)
- Place of birth: Gothenburg, Sweden
- Position: Forward

Senior career*
Years	Team	Apps	(Gls)
1979–1984	GAIS	106	(32)
1985	Karlstad BK	19	(12)
1986–1990	Malmö FF	86	(28)
1987–1988	→ RSC Anderlecht (loan)	10	(2)
Total		221	(74)

International career
1978	Sweden U17	3	(0)
1979	Sweden U19	2	(0)
1987–1988	Sweden U21/O	2	(0)
- * Club domestic league appearances and goals

Fred Håkan Ingvar Lindman (born 27 November 1961) is a Swedish former footballer who played as a forward. Starting off his career with GAIS, he went on to represent Karlstad BK, Malmö FF, and RSC Anderlecht during a career that spanned between 1979 and 1990. He represented the Sweden Olympic team at the 1988 Summer Olympics. During the 1989–90 European Cup, Lindman scored the winning goal which saw Malmö FF eliminate Inter Milan from the competition. In 1990, he retired following picking up a serious knee injury.

== Honours ==
Malmö FF

- Swedish Champion: 1988
