= Slaheddine Fessi =

Tunisian footballer

Personal information
- Date of birth: 15 November 1956 (age 69)
- Height: 1.79 m (5 ft 10 in)
- Position: Goalkeeper

Youth career
- 1966–?: Club Africain

Senior career*
| Years | Team | Apps | (Gls) |
- Club Africain
| 1979–1980 | FSV Frankfurt | 8 | (0) |
- Stade Gabèsien

International career
| 1987–1989 | Tunisia | 6 | (0) |
- * Club domestic league appearances and goals

Slaheddine Fessi (born 15 November 1956) is a Tunisian former footballer who played as a goalkeeper for the national team. He competed in the men's tournament at the 1988 Summer Olympics.

== Career ==
Fessi joined Club Africain in 1966, at the age of 10. For a while, he also played handball and volleyball. After being promoted to Club Africain's senior team, he was initially understudy to Sadok Sassi and Mokhtar Naili.

Fessi spent two seasons with German club FSV Frankfurt. Having been third-choice goalkeeper at the club, he made his debut in April 1980 in the 2. Bundesliga, replacing the injured Jürgen Grün in a 3–0 loss to SC Freiburg. He went on to make eight league appearances in the 1979–80 2. Bundesliga season. He left the club in summer 1980.

Fessi signed with Stade Gabèsien after his return from Germany.
