= Armin Görtz =

German football player

Personal information
- Date of birth: 30 August 1959 (age 67)
- Place of birth: Dortmund, West Germany
- Height: 1.79 m (5 ft 10 in)
- Position: Midfielder

Senior career*
| Years | Team | Apps | (Gls) |
| 1981–1982 | Eintracht Frankfurt | 5 | (0) |
| 1982–1983 | FSV Frankfurt | 17 | (2) |
| 1983–1984 | Beveren | | |
| 1984–1986 | K.S.V. Waregem | | |
| 1986–1990 | 1. FC Köln | 112 | (8) |
| 1990–1993 | Hertha BSC | 54 | (2) |

International career
| 1988 | West Germany | 2 | (0) |
Medal record
Men's Football
Representing West Germany
Olympic Games
| Bronze medal – third place | 1988 Seoul | Team competition |
- * Club domestic league appearances and goals

Armin Görtz (born 30 August 1959) is a German former professional footballer who played as a midfielder.

== Career ==
Görtz played top-flight football in (West) Germany and Belgium.

He won two caps for the West Germany national team in 1988.
