= Thomas Hörster =

German retired footballer (born 1956)

Personal information
- Full name: Thomas Hörster
- Date of birth: 27 November 1956 (age 69)
- Place of birth: Essen, West Germany
- Height: 1.85 m (6 ft 1 in)
- Position: Defender

Youth career
- 1965–1969: Blau-Weiß Holsterhausen
- 1969–1975: Schwarz-Weiß Essen

Senior career*
Years	Team	Apps	(Gls)
1974–1977	Schwarz-Weiß Essen	71	(8)
1977–1991	Bayer Leverkusen	404	(26)
1991–1993	VfL Hamm/Sieg	44	(1)
Total		519	(35)

International career
1986–1987	West Germany	4	(0)
1987–1988	West Germany Olympic	12	(0)

Managerial career
- 1992–2001: Bayer Leverkusen (youth)
- 2001: Bayer Leverkusen (caretaker)
- 2001–2003: Bayer Leverkusen II
- 2003: Bayer Leverkusen
- 2003–2007: Bayer Leverkusen (youth)
Medal record
Bayer Leverkusen
Winner	UEFA Cup	1988
West Germany
Bronze medal – third place	Olympics	1988
- * Club domestic league appearances and goals

Thomas Hörster (born 27 November 1956) is a German retired footballer who played as a defender.

== Club career ==
Born in Essen, Hörster spent his first three seasons as a professional with local Schwarz-Weiß Essen, in the second division. For 1977–78 he signed with another club in the league, Bayer 04 Leverkusen.

After winning promotion to the Bundesliga in 1979, Hörster was an essential defensive unit for Bayer in the following 13 seasons, his lowest input being 24 games in the 1981–82 campaign. In 1987–88 he appeared in a total of 35 official matches, including nine in the team's victorious run in the UEFA Cup – one goal against FK Austria Wien in a 5–1 home win (also the aggregate score)– even though he did not appear in any of the two matches of the final against RCD Español.

Hörster retired from top football in June 1991 at the age of 34, with top flight totals of 332 games and 16 goals. He remained closely associated with Leverkusen in the following years, working as manager (youth teams, reserves, caretaker) and scout. On 16 February 2003, he was appointed main squad manager, leaving his position on 12 May.

== International career ==
Hörster won four caps for West Germany, his debut coming on 24 September 1986 in a 2–0 friendly win in Denmark. All of his three other appearances were also in exhibition games.

Hörster was part of the West Germany Olympic team at the 1988 Summer Olympics in Seoul, helping the side win the bronze medal.

== Honours ==
=== Player ===
Bayer Leverkusen

- 2. Bundesliga Nord: 1978–79
- UEFA Cup: 1987–88
