= Adel Smirani =

Tunisian footballer

Personal information
- Date of birth: 7 October 1967 (age 59)
- Position: Defender

International career
Years	Team	Apps	(Gls)
- Tunisia

Adel Smirani (born 7 October 1967) is a Tunisian former footballer who played as a defender for the Tunisia national team. He competed in the men's tournament at the 1988 Summer Olympics.
