= Lotfi Rouissi =

Tunisian footballer

Personal information
- Date of birth: 13 November 1965 (age 60)
- Position: Forward

Senior career*
Years	Team	Apps	(Gls)
- Club Africain

International career
- Tunisia U20
1985–1993	Tunisia	40	(1)
- * Club domestic league appearances and goals

Lotfi Rouissi (born 13 November 1965) is a Tunisian former footballer who played as a forward for the Tunisia national team. He competed in the men's tournament at the 1988 Summer Olympics. He also represented the national under-20 team in the 1985 FIFA World Youth Championship.
