= Naceur Chouchane =

Tunisian footballer

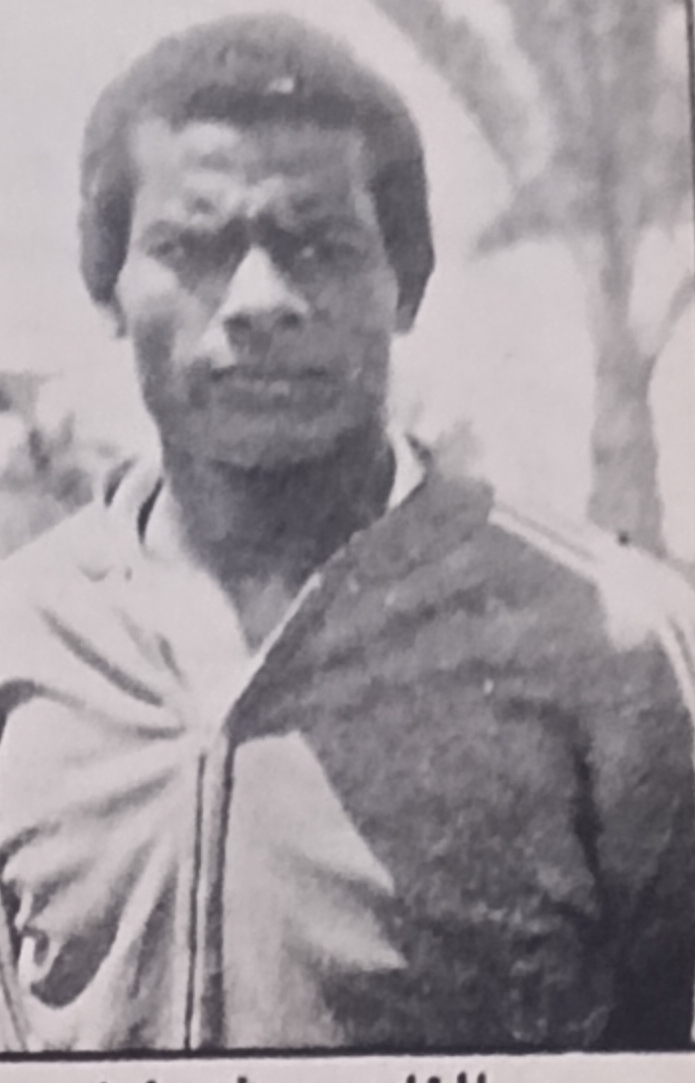

Personal information
- Full name: Mohamed Naceur Chouchane
- Date of birth: 3 May 1955 (age 71)
- Height: 1.83 m (6 ft 0 in)
- Position: Goalkeeper

Senior career*
| Years | Team | Apps | (Gls) |
| 1973–1992 | ES Tunis | | |

International career
- Tunisia
- * Club domestic league appearances and goals

Mohamed Naceur Chouchane (born 3 May 1955) is a Tunisian former footballer who played as a goalkeeper. He competed in the men's tournament at the 1988 Summer Olympics.
