= Sulo Vaattovaara =

Swedish footballer

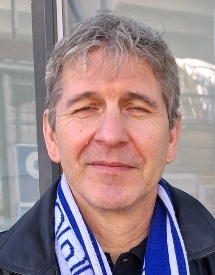

Personal information
- Date of birth: 18 July 1962 (age 64)
- Place of birth: Torshälla, Sweden
- Height: 1.80 m (5 ft 11 in)
- Position: Defender

Senior career*
Years	Team	Apps	(Gls)
1980–1983	Gällivare SK	54	(6)
1983–1988	Hammarby IF	114	(9)
1988–1998	IFK Norrköping	252	(12)
1998–1999	IF Sylvia	29	(3)
Total		449	(30)

International career^{‡}
1988–1990	Sweden	6	(0)
- * Club domestic league appearances and goals as of 26 October 2017 (UTC) ‡ National team caps and goals as of 26 October (UTC)

Sulo Vaattovaara (born 18 July 1962) is a Swedish former footballer who played as a defender. During his club career, Vaattovaara played for Gällivare SK, Hammarby IF, IFK Norrköping and IF Sylvia between 1980 and 1999. He made 6 appearances for the Sweden national team. He also competed in the men's tournament at the 1988 Summer Olympics. Vaattovaara is of Finnish descent.

== Honours ==
IFK Norrköping

- Swedish Champion: 1989
- Svenska Cupen: 1987-88, 1990-91, 1993-94
