= Benny Lennartsson =

Swedish footballer (born 1942)

Personal information
- Date of birth: 14 December 1942 (age 83)
- Place of birth: Örebro, Sweden

Youth career
- Örebro

Senior career*
Years	Team	Apps	(Gls)
- Örebro
- Fulham
- FC Monthey

Managerial career
- 1969–1975: FC Monthey
- 1976–1978: Örebro
- 1979–1980: IFK Sundsvall
- 1980–1985: Sweden U21
- 1985–1988: Sweden Olympic team
- 1988–1991: Viking
- 1993–1995: BK Forward
- 1995–1998: Lyngby
- 1998–1999: Bristol City
- 2000–2002: Viking
- 2003: Viborg
- 2007: Start
- 2009: GAIS (assistant coach)
- 2010: Ivory Coast (assistant coach)
- * Club domestic league appearances and goals

Benny Lennartsson (born 14 December 1942) is a Swedish football coach, former football and bandy player.

He has managed Örebro SK, Viking FK, Lyngby FC and Bristol City among others.

== Managerial career ==
=== Viking ===
In 1988, Lennartsson was appointed head coach of Norwegian club Viking. He led the club to promotion from the 1988 Norwegian Second Division in his first season. In the following seasons, Viking won the 1989 Norwegian Cup and the 1991 Tippeligaen. Lennartsson left the club after the 1991 season. He returned to Viking ahead of the 2000 season. The club finished third in both the 2000 Tippeligaen and the 2001 Tippeligaen, became runners-up in the 2000 Norwegian Cup and won the 2001 Norwegian Cup. In Lennartsson's last season, Viking finished fourth in the 2002 Tippeligaen and knocked Chelsea out of the 2002–03 UEFA Cup.

== Honours ==
Viking

- Tippeligaen: 1991
- Norwegian Second Division: 1988
- Norwegian Cup: 1989, 2001

Individual

- Kniksen Award Coach of the Year: 1991, 2000
