= Modher Baouab =

Tunisian footballer

Personal information
- Date of birth: 13 May 1961 (age 65)

International career
Years	Team	Apps	(Gls)
- Tunisia

Modher Baouab (born 13 May 1961) is a Tunisian former footballer who played for the Tunisia national team. He competed in the men's tournament at the 1988 Summer Olympics.
