= Gao Fengwen =

Chinese footballer and coach (1939–2020)

Gao Fengwen 高丰文
Personal information
- Full name: Gao Fengwen
- Date of birth: 23 November 1939
- Place of birth: Kaiyuan, Liaoning, China (Kaiyuan, Fengtian, Manchukuo)
- Date of death: 27 October 2020 (aged 80)
- Position: Midfielder

Senior career*
Years	Team	Apps	(Gls)
1957–1973	Liaoning FC		

International career
1965–1973	China PR		

Managerial career
- 1981–1983: China PR U-20
- 1984–1985: China PR U-16
- 1986–1990: China PR
- * Club domestic league appearances and goals

Gao Fengwen (Chinese: 高丰文; 23 November 1939 – 27 October 2020) was a Chinese football coach and an international football player.

== Playing career ==
Gao Fengwen was born in Kaiyuan. He was a promising young footballer and would play for Liaoning FC before being called up to the Chinese national team in 1965 where he was honoured with being the team's captain. The Chinese Cultural Revolution saw his career severely shortened and he was unable to play in any major international tournaments. He did, however, play in several small tournaments and was able to represent his country on several occasions before he retired.

== Management career ==
After he retired Gao Fengwen went to Yemen in 1974 and then to Burundi in 1977 to teach for several years before returning in 1979 to China, where he took a training course in coaching before being offered the Chinese youth team position. During his reign he would lead China into the 1982 AFC Youth Championship where China came second before also taking on the Chinese U-16 team in the 1985 FIFA U-16 World Championship where he would lead them to a quarterfinals position. After his experiences with the previous Chinese teams he would go on to be promoted to the Chinese senior team on 25 December 1986 where his first assignment was to make sure China qualify for the 1988 AFC Asian Cup. After successfully achieving this he would then lead the senior team in the Football at the 1988 Summer Olympics for the first time. While it was an achievement that China took part in their first ever Olympics at the football the tournament was however considered very disappointing and the team was unable to score a single goal. Given the chance of another tournament only a few months later with the 1988 AFC Asian Cup Gao's fortunes would change and this time he would lead China to a more successful tournament and lead China to semifinals position where he narrowly missed out leading China to the final after losing to Korea Republic in extra time. Gao would also narrowly miss out in leading China to qualify for the 1990 FIFA World Cup after losing to Qatar in the final game in the dying minutes of the game and elimination from the qualifiers. Despite this, Gao kept his job and he led China in the Football at the 1990 Asian Games; however, this tournament turned out to be a disaster after they lost to Thailand and were eliminated, which led Gao to resign. Leaving management behind, he started his own football school in 1996.

Sporting positions
Preceded by unknown	China national football team captain 1965-1972	Succeeded by Qi Wusheng
