= Sweden Olympic football team =

Men's U23 national association football team representing Sweden

Sweden Olympic
- Nickname: Blågult (The Blue-Yellow)
- Association: Svenska Fotbollförbundet (SvFF)
- Confederation: UEFA (Europe)
- FIFA code: SWE
First colours	Second colours

First international
- Sweden 1–3 Finland (Iisalmi, Finland; 5 August 1986)

Biggest win
- Sweden 4–0 Morocco (Sabadell, Spain; 28 July 1992)

Biggest defeat
- West Germany 3–0 Sweden (Essen, West Germany; 28 October 1986)

Olympics
- Appearances: 3 (first in 1988)
- Best result: Quarter-finals (1988, 1992)

The Sweden Olympic football team (also informally known as Sweden national under-23 football team from 1992) is the football team representing Sweden in Olympics and is controlled by the Swedish Football Association. The team has been active since 1984, when the IOC restricted UEFA countries to only include players without FIFA World Cup appearances.

The team qualified for the 1988 and 1992 Olympics, reaching the quarter-finals both times. In the 2016 Olympics, Sweden was eliminated in the group stage. Since 1992, the UEFA European Under-21 Championship acts as the qualification to the Olympics for the European teams. Therefore, the Swedish Olympic team is only active in the event of Sweden qualifying for the Olympics. The team has been coached by Benny Lennartsson (1986–1988), Nisse Andersson (1992) and Håkan Ericson (2016).

== Olympic record ==
Football at the Summer Olympics was first played officially in 1908. The Olympiads between 1896 and 1980 were only open for amateur players. The 1984 and 1988 tournaments were open to players with no appearances in the FIFA World Cup. Since 1992 Olympics, the football event was changed into a tournament for under-23 teams with a maximum of three overage players. See Sweden men's national football team for competition record from 1908 until 1980.

Champions Runners-up Third place Fourth place Tournament held on home soil

Olympic Games record									Olympic Games qualification record					
Year	Round	Position	Pld	W	D	L	GF	GA	Pld	W	D	L	GF	GA
1908–1980	See Sweden men's national football team													
(United States) 1984	Did not enter								Did not enter					
(South Korea) 1988	Quarter-finals	6th	4	2	1	1	7	5	8	6	1	1	13	6
(Spain) 1992	Quarter-finals	5th	4	1	2	1	6	3	12	7	3	2	21	7
(United States) 1996	Did not qualify								8	5	1	2	15	4
(Australia) 2000	Did not qualify								8	2	0	6	7	15
(Greece) 2004	Did not qualify								15	8	4	3	31	21
(China) 2008	Did not qualify								4	3	0	1	8	6
(United Kingdom) 2012	Did not qualify								10	6	2	2	17	10
(Brazil) 2016	Group stage	15th	3	0	1	2	2	4	15	8	3	4	31	21
(Japan) 2020	Did not qualify								10	6	2	2	19	8
(France) 2024	Did not qualify								10	5	3	2	22	8
(United States) 2028	Did not qualify								8	3	1	4	10	19
(Australia) 2032	To be determined								To be determined					
Total	Best: Quarter-finals	3/12	11	3	4	4	15	12	108	59	20	29	194	125

== Results ==
=== 1992 ===
26 July 1992 1992 Olympics Group C	Sweden	0–0	Paraguay	Barcelona, Spain
21:00 UTC+2		Report		Stadium: Estadi de Sarrià; Attendance: 15,000; Referee: Lube Spassov (Bulgaria)

28 July 1992 1992 Olympics Group C	Sweden	4–0	Morocco	Sabadell, Spain
19:00 UTC+2	Brolin 13', 68'; Mild 19'; Rödlund 57'	Report		Stadium: Estadi Nova Creu Alta; Attendance: 5,000; Referee: José Torres Cadena (Colombia)

30 July 1992 1992 Olympics Group C	Sweden	1–1	South Korea	Barcelona, Spain
21:00 UTC+2	Rödlund 50'	Report	Seo Jung-Won 28'	Stadium: Estadi de Sarrià; Attendance: 12,000; Referee: Manuel Díaz Vega (Spain)

2 August 1992 1992 Olympics Quarter-finals	Sweden	1–2	Australia	Barcelona, Spain
21:30 UTC+2	P. Andersson 62'	Report	Markovski 30'; Murphy 55'	Stadium: Camp Nou; Attendance: 30,000; Referee: Arturo Brizio Carter (Mexico)

=== 2016 ===
29 July 2016 Friendly	South Korea	3–2	Sweden	São Paulo, Brazil
20:00 UTC−2	Moon Chang-jin 38', 41'; Ryu Seung-woo 54'	Report	Sema 26'; Une Larsson 57'	Stadium: Pacaembu Stadium; Attendance: 11,256; Referee: Raphael Claus (Brazil)

4 August 2016 2016 Olympics Group B	Sweden	2–2	Colombia	Manaus, Brazil
18:00 UTC−4	Ishak 43'; Ajdarević 62'	Report	Gutiérrez 17'; Pabón 75' (pen.)	Stadium: Arena da Amazônia; Attendance: 29,996; Referee: Fahad Al-Mirdasi (Saudi Arabia)

7 August 2016 2016 Olympics Group B	Sweden	0–1	Nigeria	Manaus, Brazil
18:00 UTC−4		Report	Sadiq 40'	Stadium: Arena da Amazônia; Attendance: 23,892; Referee: Matthew Conger (New Zealand)

10 August 2016 2016 Olympics Group B	Japan	1–0	Sweden	Salvador, Brazil
19:00 UTC−3	Yajima 65'	Report		Stadium: Itaipava Arena Fonte Nova; Attendance: 17,821; Referee: Malang Diedhiou (Senegal)

== Players ==
=== 2016 Summer Olympics squad ===
The following 18 players were called up for the 2016 Summer Olympics.

Caps, goals, ages and club information updated as of 10 August 2016.

No.	Pos.	Player	Date of birth (age)	Caps	Goals	Club
1	GK	Andreas Linde	24 July 1993 (aged 23)	4	0	(Norwegian Football Federation) Molde FK
18	GK	Tim Erlandsson	25 December 1996 (aged 19)	0	0	(The Football Association) Nottingham Forest
2	DF	Adam Lundkvist	20 March 1994 (aged 22)	4	0	(Swedish Football Association) IF Elfsborg
3	DF	Alexander Milošević (Note: Overaged player. A maximum of three players born before 1 January 1993 could be selected in the final squad.)	30 January 1992 (aged 24)	4	0	(Turkish Football Federation) Beşiktaş
4	DF	Joakim Nilsson	6 February 1994 (aged 22)	3	0	(Swedish Football Association) IF Elfsborg
5	DF	Pa Konate	25 April 1994 (aged 22)	4	0	(Swedish Football Association) Malmö FF
13	DF	Jacob Une Larsson	8 April 1994 (aged 22)	3	1	(Swedish Football Association) Djurgårdens IF
14	DF	Sebastian Starke Hedlund	5 April 1995 (aged 21)	1	0	(Swedish Football Association) Kalmar FF
15	DF	Noah Sonko Sundberg	6 June 1996 (aged 20)	0	0	(Swedish Football Association) GIF Sundsvall
6	MF	Abdul Khalili	7 June 1992 (aged 24)	4	0	(Turkish Football Federation) Mersin İdman Yurdu
7	MF	Simon Tibbling	7 September 1994 (aged 21)	4	0	(Royal Dutch Football Association) Groningen
8	MF	Alexander Fransson	2 April 1994 (aged 22)	3	0	(Swiss Football Association) Basel
9	MF	Robin Quaison	9 October 1993 (aged 22)	4	0	(Italian Football Federation) Palermo
10	MF	Muamer Tanković	22 February 1995 (aged 21)	4	0	(Royal Dutch Football Association) AZ
11	MF	Astrit Ajdarević (captain)	17 April 1990 (aged 26)	4	1	(Swedish Football Association) Örebro SK
17	MF	Ken Sema	30 September 1993 (aged 22)	4	1	(Swedish Football Association) Östersunds FK
12	FW	Mikael Ishak	31 March 1993 (aged 23)	3	1	(Danish Football Association) Randers FC
21	FW	Valmir Berisha	6 June 1996 (aged 20)	2	0	Unattached

==== Alternate players ====
The following 3 players were listed as alternate players.

No.	Pos.	Player	Date of birth (age)	Caps	Goals	Club
22	GK	Jesper Johansson	30 May 1994 (aged 22)	0	0	(Swedish Football Association) GAIS
19	DF	Alexander Leksell	14 February 1997 (aged 19)	0	0	(Swedish Football Association) IFK Göteborg
20	MF	Adnan Marić	17 February 1997 (aged 19)	1	0	(Football Association of Wales) Swansea City

==== Provisional players ====
The following 16 players were in the provisional squad but weren't selected for the final squad.

No.	Pos.	Player	Date of birth (age)	Caps	Goals	Club
	GK	Jacob Rinne	20 June 1993 (aged 23)			(Royal Belgian Football Association) Gent
	DF	Ludwig Augustinsson	21 April 1994 (aged 22)			(Danish Football Association) Copenhagen
	DF	Emil Bergström	19 May 1993 (aged 23)			(Russian Football Union) Rubin Kazan
	DF	Filip Helander	22 April 1993 (aged 23)			(Italian Football Federation) Hellas Verona
	DF	Victor Lindelöf	17 July 1994 (aged 22)			(Portuguese Football Federation) Benfica
	DF	Ali Suljić	18 September 1997 (aged 18)			(The Football Association) Chelsea
	DF	Isak Ssewankambo	27 February 1996 (aged 20)			(Norwegian Football Federation) Molde FK
	MF	Alexander Faltsetas	4 July 1987 (aged 29)			(Swedish Football Association) Djurgårdens IF
	MF	Melker Hallberg	20 October 1995 (aged 20)			(Italian Football Federation) Ascoli
	MF	Jiloan Hamad	6 November 1990 (aged 25)			(German Football Association) 1899 Hoffenheim
	MF	David Moberg Karlsson	20 March 1994 (aged 22)			(Swedish Football Association) IFK Norrköping
	FW	Ferhad Ayaz	10 October 1994 (aged 21)			(Swedish Football Association) Örebro SK
	FW	Gustav Engvall	29 April 1996 (aged 20)			(Swedish Football Association) IFK Göteborg
	FW	Zlatan Ibrahimović	3 October 1981 (aged 34)			(The Football Association) Manchester United
	FW	Isaac Kiese Thelin	24 June 1992 (aged 24)			(French Football Federation) Bordeaux
	FW	Jordan Larsson	20 June 1997 (aged 19)			(Swedish Football Association) Helsingborgs IF

=== Previous squads ===
- 1988 Olympics squad
- 1992 Olympics squad
- 2016 Olympics squad

=== Overage players in Olympic Games ===
Tournament	Player 1	Player 2	Player 3
2016	Alexander Milošević (DF)	Astrit Ajdarević (MF)	Abdul Khalili (MF)

== See also ==
- Sweden men's national football team
- Sweden national under-21 football team
- Sweden men's national under-19 football team
- Sweden men's national under-17 football team
- Sweden national football B team (defunct)
- Football at the Summer Olympics
