= Football at the 1988 Summer Olympics – Group B =

== Table ==
Pos	Team	Pld	W	D	L	GF	GA	GD	Pts	Zambia national football team	Italy national football team	Iraq national football team	Guatemala national football team
1	Zambia	3	2	1	0	10	2	+8	5		4–0	2–2	4–0
2	Italy	3	2	0	1	7	6	+1	4	0–4		2–0	5–2
3	Iraq	3	1	1	1	5	4	+1	3	2–2	0–2		3–0
4	Guatemala	3	0	0	3	2	12	−10	0	0–4	2–5	0–3	

Source: FIFA
Legend: Blue = home team win; Yellow = draw; Red = away team win.

== Matches ==
=== Italy vs Guatemala ===
Italy	5 — 2 (final score after 90 minutes)	Guatemala
Manager: (Italy) Francesco Rocca Team: 01 - GK - Stefano Tacconi; 06 - DF - Mauro Tassotti; 02 - DF - Roberto Cravero; 04 - DF - Luigi De Agostini (yellow card) 90'; 05 - DF - Ciro Ferrara; 07 - MF - Angelo Colombo; 18 - MF - Massimo Mauro; 16 - MF - Giuseppe Iachini sub 69'; 19 - MF - Alberico Evani sub 60'; 03 - FW - Andrea Carnevale; 13 - FW - Pietro Paolo Virdis Substitutes: 15 - DF - Roberto Galia on 60'; 17 - MF - Stefano Desideri on 69' Unused Substitutes: 20 - GK - Gianluca Pagliuca ? ? Scorers: 1-0 Andrea Carnevale (3'); 2-1 Alberico Evani (11'); 3-1 Pietro Paolo Virdis (34'); 4-1 Ciro Ferrara (38'); 5-1 Stefano Desideri (75')	Half-time: 4-1 Competition: Olympic tournament (group stage) Date: Saturday; September 17, 1988 Kick off: 5 p.m. Venue: Gwangju Mudeung Stadium, Gwangju Attendance: 12000 Referee: Shizuo Takada JPN Assistants: Jassim Mandi BHR; Choi Gil-Soo KOR Match rules: 90 minutes Five named substitutes Maximum of 2 substitutions	Manager: (Guatemala) Jorge Roldán Team: 01 - GK - Ricardo Jérez; 02 - DF - Juan Manuel Dávila; 04 - DF - Rocael Mazariegos sub 78'; 05 - DF - Victor Hugo Monzón; 03 - DF - Allan Wellmann; 06 - MF - Jaime Batres; 10 - MF - Byron Pérez; 08 - MF - Juan Manuel Funes; 17 - MF - Julio Alberto Rodas; 09 - FW - Adán Paniagua; 07 - FW - Carlos Castañeda Substitutes: 15 - DF - Alejandro Ortiz Obregón on 78' (yellow card) 83' Unused Substitutes: 18 - GK - Ricardo Piccinini ? ? ? Scorers: 1-1 Carlos Castañeda (7'); 5-2 Adán Paniagua (79')

=== Zambia vs Iraq ===
Zambia	2 — 2 (final score after 90 minutes)	Iraq
Manager: (Zambia) Samuel Ndhlovu Team: 01 - GK - David Chabala sub 60'; 05 - DF - James Chitalu (yellow card) 40'; 15 - DF - Ashols Melu; 04 - DF - Samuel Chomba; 03 - DF - Edmon Mumba; 07 - MF - Jonson Bwalya; 06 - MF - Derby Makinka; 12 - MF - Kalusha Bwalya; 08 - MF - Charles Musonda; 19 - FW - Stone Nyirenda; 18 - FW - Wisdom Mumba Chansa Substitutes: 16 - GK - Richard Mwanza on 60' Unused Substitutes: ? ? ? ? Scorers: 1-1 Stone Nyirenda (44'); 2-1 Kalusha Bwalya (66')	Half-time: 1-1 Competition: Olympic tournament (group stage) Date: Saturday; September 17, 1988 Kick off: 7 p.m. Venue: Daejeon Hanbat Stadium, Daejeon Attendance: 29600 Referee: Jesús Díaz COL Assistants: Vincent Mauro USA; Alexey Spirin URS Match rules: 90 minutes Five named substitutes Maximum of 2 substitutions	Manager: (Iraq) Ammo Baba Team: 01 - GK - Ahmad Jassim; 06 - DF - Habib Jafar; 03 - DF - Hassan Kamal; 04 - DF - Ghanim Oraibi; 02 - DF - Adnan Dirjal; 15 - MF - Natiq Hashim; 14 - MF - Basil Gorgis sub 46'; 11 - MF - Saad Qais; 13 - MF - Karim Allawi; 10 - FW - Hussein Saeed; 08 - FW - Ahmed Radhi Substitutes: 09 - DF - Ismail Mohammed Sharif on 46' Unused Substitutes: 20 - GK - Emad Hashim ? ? ? Scorers: 0-1 Ahmed Radhi (36', pen.); 2-2 Karim Allawi (71')

=== Zambia vs Italy ===
Zambia	4 — 0 (final score after 90 minutes)	Italy
Manager: (Zambia) Samuel Ndhlovu Team: 01 - GK - David Chabala; 14 - DF - Manfred Chabinga; 15 - DF - Ashols Melu; 04 - DF - Samuel Chomba; 03 - DF - Edmon Mumba; 07 - MF - Jonson Bwalya; 08 - MF - Charles Musonda; 06 - MF - Derby Makinka (yellow card) 77'; 12 - MF - Kalusha Bwalya; 19 - FW - Stone Nyirenda; 18 - FW - Wisdom Mumba Chansa sub 71' Substitutes: 10 - ? - Webster Chikabala on 71' Unused Substitutes: 16 - GK - Richard Mwanza ? ? ? Scorers: 1-0 Kalusha Bwalya (40'); 2-0 Kalusha Bwalya (55'); 3-0 Jonson Bwalya (63'); 4-0 Kalusha Bwalya (90')	Half-time: 1-0 Competition: Olympic tournament (group stage) Date: Monday; September 19, 1988 Kick off: 5 p.m. Venue: Gwangju Mudeung Stadium, Gwangju Attendance: 9800 Referee: Keith Hackett GRB Assistants: Shizuo Takada JPN; Juan Carlos Loustau ARG Match rules: 90 minutes Five named substitutes Maximum of 2 substitutions	Manager: (Italy) Francesco Rocca Team: 01 - GK - Stefano Tacconi (yellow card) 57'; 06 - DF - Mauro Tassotti; 02 - DF - Roberto Cravero sub 61'; 04 - DF - Luigi De Agostini; 05 - DF - Ciro Ferrara (yellow card) 42'; 07 - MF - Angelo Colombo sub 61' (yellow card) 60'; 18 - MF - Massimo Mauro (yellow card) 50'; 15 - MF - Roberto Galia; 16 - MF - Giuseppe Iachini; 03 - FW - Andrea Carnevale; 13 - FW - Pietro Paolo Virdis Substitutes: 08 - DF - Luca Pellegrini on 61'; 11 - MF - Massimo Crippa on 61' Unused Substitutes: 20 - GK - Gianluca Pagliuca ? ? Scorers: -

=== Iraq vs Guatemala ===
Iraq	3 — 0 (final score after 90 minutes)	Guatemala
Manager: (Iraq) Ammo Baba Team: 01 - GK - Ahmad Jassim; 02 - DF - Adnan Dirjal; 03 - DF - Hassan Kamal; 04 - DF - Ghanim Oraibi; 16 - DF - Mudhafar Jabbar; 06 - MF - Habib Jafar; 14 - MF - Basil Gorgis sub 46'; 09 - MF - Ismail Mohammed Sharif; 11 - MF - Saad Qais; 08 - FW - Ahmed Radhi (yellow card) 17'; 10 - FW - Hussein Saeed sub 78' Substitutes: 17 - MF - Laith Hussein on 46'; 07 - ? - Younis Abed Ali on 78' Unused Substitutes: 20 - GK - Emad Hashim ? ? Scorers: 1-0 Ahmed Radhi (57'); 2-0 Mudhafar Jabbar (67'); 3-0 Rocael Mazariegos (77', og)	Half-time: 0-0 Competition: Olympic tournament (group stage) Date: Monday; September 19, 1988 Kick off: 7 p.m. Venue: Daejeon Hanbat Stadium, Daejeon Attendance: 23500 Referee: Jean-Fidele Diramba GAB Assistants: Choi Gil-Soo KOR; Kim In-soo KOR Match rules: 90 minutes Five named substitutes Maximum of 2 substitutions	Manager: (Guatemala) Jorge Roldán Team: 18 - GK - Ricardo Piccinini; 02 - DF - Juan Manuel Dávila; 04 - DF - Rocael Mazariegos; 05 - DF - Victor Hugo Monzón; 03 - DF - Allan Wellmann; 17 - MF - Julio Alberto Rodas sub 69'; 06 - MF - Jaime Batres sub 81'; 10 - MF - Byron Pérez; 08 - MF - Juan Manuel Funes; 09 - FW - Adán Paniagua; 07 - FW - Carlos Castañeda Substitutes: 11 - FW - Norman Delva on 69'; 12 - FW - Kevin Sandoval on 81' Unused Substitutes: 01 - GK - Ricardo Jerez ? ? Scorers: -

=== Zambia vs Guatemala ===
Zambia	4 — 0 (final score after 90 minutes)	Guatemala
Manager: (Zambia) Samuel Ndhlovu Team: 01 - GK - David Chabala; 14 - DF - Manfred Chabinga (yellow card) 17'; 15 - DF - Ashols Melu; 20 - DF - Eston Mulenga; 03 - DF - Edmon Mumba; 09 - MF - Beston Chambeshi; 08 - MF - Charles Musonda; 06 - MF - Derby Makinka; 12 - MF - Kalusha Bwalya; 19 - FW - Stone Nyirenda sub 80'; 18 - FW - Wisdom Mumba Chansa Substitutes: 17 - ? - Pearson Mwanza on 80' Unused Substitutes: 16 - GK - Richard Mwanza ? ? ? Scorers: 1-0 Derby Makinka (53'); 2-0 Kalusha Bwalya (79'); 3-0 Kalusha Bwalya (82'); 4-0 Derby Makinka (85')	Half-time: 0-0 Competition: Olympic tournament (group stage) Date: Wednesday; September 21, 1988 Kick off: 5 p.m. Venue: Gwangju Mudeung Stadium, Gwangju Attendance: 9000 Referee: Mandi Jassim BHR Assistants: Juan Carlos Loustau ARG; Kil Ki-Chul KOR Match rules: 90 minutes Five named substitutes Maximum of 2 substitutions	Manager: (Guatemala) Jorge Roldán Team: 01 - GK - Ricardo Jérez; 02 - DF - Juan Manuel Dávila; 05 - DF - Victor Hugo Monzón sub 46'; 04 - DF - Rocael Mazariegos; 15 - DF - Alejandro Ortiz Obregón; 17 - MF - Julio Alberto Rodas; 13 - MF - Luis López; 12 - MF - Kevin Sandoval sub 61'; 10 - MF - Byron Pérez (yellow card) 48'; 11 - FW - Norman Delva; 07 - FW - Carlos Castañeda Substitutes: 06 - DF - Jaime Batres on 46'; 16 - ? - David Gardiner on 61' Unused Substitutes: 18 - GK - Ricardo Piccinini ? ? Scorers: -

=== Iraq vs Italy ===
Iraq	0 — 2 (final score after 90 minutes)	Italy
Manager: (Iraq) Ammo Baba Team: 01 - GK - Ahmed J. Mohammed; 02 - DF - Adnan Dirjal Motar; 16 - DF - Mudhafar Taufek (yellow card) 40'; 04 - DF - Ghanim Jasim (yellow card) 63'; 03 - DF - Hassan Kamal Ahmed; 06 - MF - Jafer Hibeab Okal; 17 - MF - Laith Shabib; 09 - MF - Ismael Sharef; 11 - MF - Saad Kies Noaman sub 46'; 08 - FW - Ahmad Radhi; 10 - FW - Hussein Saeed sub 70' Substitutes: 05 - ? - Samir Shakir Mahmood on 46'; 13 - ? - Karim Alahi on 70' Unused Substitutes: 20 - GK - Imad H. Hussain ? ? Scorers: -	Half-time: 0-0 Competition: Olympic tournament (group stage) Date: Wednesday; September 21, 1988 Kick off: 7 p.m. Venue: Dongdaemun Stadium, Seoul Attendance: 13000 Referee: Hernán Silva CHI Assistants: Michał Listkiewicz POL; Karl-Heinz Tritschler FRG Match rules: 90 minutes Five named substitutes Maximum of 2 substitutions	Manager: (Italy) Francesco Rocca Team: 01 - GK - Stefano Tacconi; 06 - DF - Mauro Tassotti; 09 - DF - Massimo Brambati; 05 - DF - Ciro Ferrara; 04 - DF - Luigi De Agostini; 11 - MF - Massimo Crippa; 16 - MF - Giuseppe Iachini (yellow card) 58'; 18 - MF - Massimo Mauro sub 81'; 19 - MF - Alberico Evani; 13 - FW - Pietro Paolo Virdis; 14 - FW - Ruggiero Rizzitelli sub 80' (yellow card) 40' Substitutes: 03 - FW - Andrea Carnevale on 80'; 07 - MF - Angelo Colombo on 81' Unused Substitutes: 20 - GK - Gianluca Pagliuca ? ? Scorers: 0-1 Ruggiero Rizzitelli (59'); 0-2 Massimo Mauro (63')
