= 1989 CONCACAF Championship squads =

These are the squads for the countries that played in the 1989 CONCACAF Championship.

The age listed for each player is on 19 March 1989, the first day of the tournament. The numbers of caps and goals listed for each player do not include any matches played after the start of the tournament. The club listed is the club for which the player last played a competitive match before the tournament. The nationality for each club reflects the national association (not the league) to which the club is affiliated. A flag is included for coaches who are of a different nationality than their own national team.

Every team besides Costa Rica fields a player playing within a foreign league with El Salvador (2), Guatemala (1), Trinidad and Tobago (2) and the United States (6) having players representing foreign clubs.

== Costa Rica ==
Head coach: (Uruguay) Gustavo de Simone, (Spain) Antonio Moyano and (Costa Rica) Marvin Rodríguez

No.	Pos.	Player	Date of birth (age)	Caps	Club
1	GK	Luis Gabelo Conejo	1 January 1960 (aged 29)	32	(Costa Rica) Ramonense
2	GK	Alejandro González	3 March 1955 (aged 34)		(Costa Rica) Alajuelense
3	GK	Hermidio Barrantes	2 September 1964 (aged 24)	0	(Costa Rica) Municipal Puntarenas
4	GK	Jorge Arturo Hidalgo	14 October 1963 (aged 25)	0	(Costa Rica) Herediano
5	DF	Enrique Díaz	23 February 1959 (aged 30)		(Costa Rica) Saprissa
5	DF	Mauricio Montero	19 October 1963 (aged 25)	21	(Costa Rica) Alajuelense
7	DF	Vladimir Quesada	12 May 1966 (aged 22)	0	(Costa Rica) Saprissa
8	DF	Róger Flores	26 May 1959 (aged 29)		(Costa Rica) Saprissa
9	DF	Edwin Salazar	7 August 1962 (aged 26)		(Costa Rica) Cartaginés
10	MF	José Carlos Chaves	3 September 1958 (aged 30)	0	(Costa Rica) Alajuelense
11	DF	Tomás Segura	10 February 1963 (aged 26)		(Costa Rica) Saprissa
12	MF	Enrique Rivers	4 January 1961 (aged 28)		(Costa Rica) Limonense
13	MF	Oscar Ramírez	8 December 1964 (aged 24)	25	(Costa Rica) Alajuelense
14	MF	Germán Chavarría	19 March 1958 (aged 31)	3	(Costa Rica) Herediano
15	MF	Alexandre Guimarães	7 November 1959 (aged 29)	0	(Costa Rica) Saprissa
16	DF	Héctor Marchena	4 January 1965 (aged 24)	0	(Costa Rica) Cartaginés
17	MF	Juan Cayasso	24 June 1961 (aged 27)	1	(Costa Rica) Saprissa
18	DF	Rónald Marín	2 November 1962 (aged 26)	3	(Costa Rica) Herediano
19	MF	Álvaro Solano	25 June 1961 (aged 27)		(Costa Rica) Alajuelense
20	MF	Javier Wanchope	10 August 1968 (aged 20)		(Costa Rica) Herediano
21	MF	Carlos Mario Hidalgo	15 February 1963 (aged 26)		(Costa Rica) Saprissa
22	MF	Alexánder Sáenz	18 July 1963 (aged 25)		(Costa Rica) Cartaginés
23	FW	Pastor Fernández	2 April 1963 (aged 25)		(Costa Rica) Cartaginés
24	FW	Leonidas Flores	24 January 1965 (aged 24)	0	(Costa Rica) Puntarenas
25	FW	Evaristo Coronado	13 September 1960 (aged 28)	0	(Costa Rica) Saprissa
26	DF	Marvin Obando	4 April 1960 (aged 28)	6	(Costa Rica) Herediano
27	FW	Hernán Medford	23 May 1968 (aged 20)	18	(Costa Rica) Saprissa
28	FW	Claudio Jara	6 May 1959 (aged 29)	0	(Costa Rica) Herediano
29	FW	Gilberto Rhoden	22 October 1962 (aged 26)	0	(Costa Rica) Alajuelense
30	FW	Danilo Brenes	28 December 1970 (aged 18)	0	(Costa Rica) Puntarenas

== El Salvador ==
Head coach: (Socialist Federal Republic of Yugoslavia) Miroslav Vukašinović

No.	Pos.	Player	Date of birth (age)	Caps	Club
1	GK	Luis Guevara Mora	2 September 1961 (aged 27)		(El Salvador) Atlético Marte
2	GK	Raúl Antonio García	13 September 1962 (aged 26)		(El Salvador) Águila
3	GK	Carlos Rivera	4 January 1959 (aged 30)		(El Salvador) Metapán
4	GK	Raúl Chamagua	10 February 1960 (aged 29)		(El Salvador) Luis Ángel Firpo
5	GK	William Rosales	3 June 1963 (aged 25)		(El Salvador) Alianza
6	GK	Erik Hasbún	19 March 1966 (aged 23)		(El Salvador) Alianza
7	GK	Margarito Morán	1 January 1964 (aged 25)		(El Salvador) Luis Ángel Firpo
8	GK	Mauricio Henríquez	14 October 1963 (aged 25)		(El Salvador) Cojutepeque
9	DF	Fredy Orellana	10 May 1959 (aged 29)		(El Salvador) Alianza
10	MF	Jaime Rodríguez	17 January 1959 (aged 30)		(Mexico) Atlas
11	MF	Mauricio Alfaro	13 February 1956 (aged 33)	0	(El Salvador) Cojutepeque
12	DF	Víctor Coreas	30 March 1963 (aged 25)	0	(El Salvador) Luis Ángel Firpo
13	DF	Leonel Cárcamo	5 May 1965 (aged 23)		(El Salvador) Luis Ángel Firpo
14	DF	Jorge Ábrego	13 February 1956 (aged 33)	0	(El Salvador) FAS
15	DF	Nelson Portillo	5 May 1959 (aged 29)	0	(El Salvador) Chalatenango
16	DF	Miguel Ángel Díaz	27 January 1957 (aged 32)	0	(El Salvador) CD Chalatenango
17	DF	Giovanni Martínez	8 December 1966 (aged 22)		(El Salvador) Luis Ángel Firpo
18	DF	Jaime Murillo	19 May 1970 (aged 18)		(El Salvador) Metapán
19	DF	William Girón	15 May 1965 (aged 23)		(El Salvador) Cojutepeque
20	DF	Jorge Portillo		0	(El Salvador) CD Chalatenango
21	MF	Erik Menjivar	1 September 1965 (aged 23)		(El Salvador) Cojutepeque
22	MF	José Luis Rugamas	5 June 1953 (aged 35)	0	(El Salvador) FAS
23	MF	Miguel Estrada	7 October 1962 (aged 26)	0	(El Salvador) Luis Ángel Firpo
24	MF	Mauricio Cienfuegos	12 February 1968 (aged 21)		(El Salvador) Luis Ángel Firpo
25	MF	Oscar Ulloa	16 September 1963 (aged 25)		(El Salvador) Acajutla
26	FW	Luis Ramírez Zapata	6 January 1954 (aged 35)	0	(El Salvador) Águila
27	MF	Fernando Lazo	28 November 1965 (aged 23)		(El Salvador) Atlético Marte
28	MF	Rodolfo Alfaro	7 August 1963 (aged 25)	0	(El Salvador) Alianza
29	MF	Oscar Armando Arbizu	6 June 1968 (aged 20)	0	(El Salvador) Atlético Marte
30	MF	Hugo Ernesto Ventura	21 October 1956 (aged 32)	0	(El Salvador) Cojutepeque
31	MF	Julio Palacios	18 January 1962 (aged 27)	0	(El Salvador) Alianza
32	MF	Dagoberto López	10 May 1963 (aged 25)	0	(El Salvador) Águila
33	MF	Juan Ramón Pacheco	13 October 1960 (aged 28)	0	(El Salvador) Alianza
34	MF	Ricardo García	12 February 1966 (aged 23)	0	(El Salvador) Atlético Marte
35	MF	Otmaro Huezo	22 May 1963 (aged 25)	0	(El Salvador) CD Chalatenango
36	MF	Guillermo Rivera	11 January 1969 (aged 20)		(El Salvador) FAS
37	MF	Alfredo Vásquez	13 August 1960 (aged 28)		(El Salvador) Alianza
38	MF	Carlos Duarte	15 May 1963 (aged 25)		(El Salvador) Metapán
39	MF	Luis Turcios	22 March 1965 (aged 23)		(El Salvador) Acajutla
40	MF	Iván Ruiz	14 August 1965 (aged 23)		(El Salvador) Luis Ángel Firpo
41	MF	Manuel Ayala	6 May 1962 (aged 26)		(El Salvador) Luis Ángel Firpo
42	MF	Juan Agustín Gámez	8 August 1965 (aged 23)		(El Salvador) Luis Ángel Firpo
43	FW	Mágico González	13 March 1958 (aged 31)	0	(Spain) Cádiz
44	FW	José María Rivas	12 May 1958 (aged 30)	0	(El Salvador) Atlético Marte
45	FW	Guillermo Ragazzone	5 January 1956 (aged 33)	?	(El Salvador) Cojutepeque
46	FW	Salvador Coreas	22 November 1960 (aged 28)	?	(El Salvador) Águila
47	FW	Osmel Zapata	14 April 1959 (aged 29)	?	(El Salvador) Luis Ángel Firpo
48	FW	Joaquín Canales	11 April 1963 (aged 25)	?	(United States) Washington Diplomats
49	FW	René Sorto	30 June 1957 (aged 31)	?	(El Salvador) Cojutepeque

== Guatemala ==
Head coaches: (Guatemala) Jorge Roldán & (Uruguay) Rubén Amorín

No.	Pos.	Player	Date of birth (age)	Caps	Club
1	GK	Ricardo Jérez	6 August 1956 (aged 32)		(Guatemala) Aurora
2	GK	Ricardo Piccinini	7 September 1949 (aged 39)		(Guatemala) Municipal
3	DF	Juan Manuel Dávila	7 May 1963 (aged 25)		(Guatemala) Aurora
4	DF	Allan Wellman	26 May 1954 (aged 34)		(Guatemala) Comunicaciones
5	DF	Rocael Mazariegos	8 January 1966 (aged 23)		(Guatemala) Juventud Retalteca
6	DF	Felix McDonald	26 June 1954 (aged 34)		(Guatemala) Municipal
7	DF	Sergio Rivera	28 November 1955 (aged 33)		(Guatemala) Comunicaciones
8	DF	Víctor Hugo Monzón	12 November 1957 (aged 31)		(Guatemala) Aurora
9	DF	Jaime Batres	28 June 1964 (aged 24)		(Guatemala) Galcasa
10	FW	Alejandro Ortíz	1 August 1958 (aged 30)		(Guatemala) Suchitepéquez
11	DF	Eduardo Acevedo	8 June 1964 (aged 24)		(Guatemala) Comunicaciones
12	DF	Otto González			(Guatemala) Bandegua
13	DF	Giovanny Hernández			(Guatemala) Municipal
14	MF	David Gardiner	11 February 1957 (aged 32)		(Guatemala) Municipal
15	MF	Juan Manuel Funes	16 May 1956 (aged 32)		(Guatemala) Municipal
16	FW	Edwin Westphal	4 March 1966 (aged 23)		(Guatemala) Bandegua
17	MF	Eddy Alburez	29 June 1960 (aged 28)		(Guatemala) Galcasa
18	FW	Julio Rodas	9 December 1966 (aged 24)		(Guatemala) Municipal
19	MF	Kevin Sandoval	18 August 1959 (aged 29)		(Guatemala) Aurora
20	MF	Marvin Ceballos			(Guatemala) Aurora
21	FW	Jorge Aníbal Vargas	27 February 1967 (aged 22)		(Guatemala) Comunicaciones
22	MF	Ernesto Almengor			(Guatemala) Chiquimulilla
23	MF	Jesús de León			(Guatemala) Aurora
24	MF	Víctor Hugo Belteton			(Guatemala)
25	MF	Javier Guevara			(Guatemala)
26	MF	Guillermo Gamboa			(Guatemala)
27	MF	Zancudo Estrada	1963 (aged 26)		(Guatemala) Xelajú
28	MF	Alex Reyes			(Guatemala)
29	FW	Oscar Sánchez	15 July 1955 (aged 33)		(Guatemala) Municipal
30	FW	Adán Paniagua	30 November 1955 (aged 33)		(Guatemala) Bandegua
31	FW	Byron Pérez	18 March 1959 (aged 30)		(Mexico) Leones Negros UdeG
32	FW	Carlos Castañeda	4 January 1963 (aged 26)		(Guatemala) Suchitepéquez
33	FW	Raúl Chacón	8 April 1964 (aged 24)		(Guatemala) Comunicaciones
34	FW	Luis Amilcar Castro	10 April 1965 (aged 23)		(Guatemala) Aurora
35	FW	Erwin Donis	3 August 1961 (aged 27)		(Guatemala) Comunicaciones
36	FW	Carlos Mora			(Guatemala) Retalhuleu
37	FW	Norman Delva	15 July 1969 (aged 19)		(Guatemala) Izabal
38	FW	Oscar Sims			(Guatemala)

== Trinidad and Tobago ==
Head coach: Everald Cummings

No.	Pos.	Player	Date of birth (age)	Caps	Club
1	GK	Earl Carter	20 December 1955 (aged 33)		(Trinidad and Tobago) Arima United
2	GK	Michael Maurice	11 November 1957 (aged 31)		(Trinidad and Tobago) Police
3	GK	Errol Lovell	25 February 1962 (aged 27)		(Trinidad and Tobago) Defence Force
4	DF	Brian Williams	21 October 1961 (aged 27)		(Trinidad and Tobago) Trintoc
5	DF	Clayton Morris (captain)	5 June 1962 (aged 26)		(Trinidad and Tobago) Trintoc
6	DF	Dexter Lee	1 March 1966 (aged 23)		(Trinidad and Tobago) Defence Force
7	DF	Marvin Faustin	22 October 1967 (aged 21)		(Trinidad and Tobago) Trintoc
8	DF	Dexter Francis	21 April 1964 (aged 24)		(Trinidad and Tobago) Defence Force
9	DF	Floyd Lawrence	24 March 1961 (aged 27)		(Trinidad and Tobago) Point Fortin Civic
10	MF	Kelvin Jones	2 January 1962 (aged 27)		(Trinidad and Tobago) Malta Caribs
11	DF	Maurice Alibey	10 November 1962 (aged 26)		(United States) Lander Bearcats
12	MF	Rickie Nelson	29 November 1963 (aged 25)		(Trinidad and Tobago) Defence Force
13	MF	Paul Allen	27 June 1963 (aged 25)		(Trinidad and Tobago) Maple
14	MF	Hutson Charles	16 September 1965 (aged 23)		(Trinidad and Tobago) Defence Force
15	MF	Kerry Jamerson	25 July 1967 (aged 21)		(Trinidad and Tobago) Defence Force
16	MF	Colvin Hutchinson	5 June 1969 (aged 19)		(Trinidad and Tobago) Signal Hill
17	MF	Richard Chinapoo	18 January 1957 (aged 32)		(United States) Dallas Sidekicks
18	FW	Dwight Yorke	3 November 1971 (aged 17)		(Trinidad and Tobago) Signal Hill
19	MF	Russell Latapy	2 August 1968 (aged 20)		(Trinidad and Tobago) Port Morant United
20	FW	Leonson Lewis	30 December 1966 (aged 22)		(Trinidad and Tobago) Port Morant United
21	FW	Philibert Jones	12 November 1964 (aged 24)		(Trinidad and Tobago) Trintoc
22	FW	Leroy Spann	12 November 1953 (aged 35)		(Trinidad and Tobago) Trintoc
23	FW	Dexter Skeene	1 April 1964 (aged 24)		(Trinidad and Tobago) Maple
24	FW	Marlon Morris	11 May 1965 (aged 23)		(Trinidad and Tobago) Airport Authority

== United States ==
Head coach: Bob Gansler

No.	Pos.	Player	Date of birth (age)	Caps	Club
1	GK	Tony Meola	21 February 1969 (aged 20)		(United States) Virginia Cavaliers
2	GK	David Vanole	6 February 1963 (aged 26)	13	(United States) Los Angeles Heat
3	GK	Jeff Duback	5 January 1964 (aged 25)	13	(United States) San Diego Nomads
4	GK	Kasey Keller	29 November 1969 (aged 19)	6	(United States) Portland Timbers
5	DF	Mike Windischmann (captain)	6 December 1965 (aged 23)	42	(United States) Albany Capitals
6	DF	Marcelo Balboa	8 August 1967 (aged 21)		(United States) San Diego Nomads
7	DF	Jimmy Banks	2 September 1964 (aged 24)		(United States) Milwaukee Wave
8	DF	Paul Krumpe	4 March 1963 (aged 26)		(United States) California Kickers
9	DF	Steve Trittschuh	24 April 1965 (aged 23)		(United States) Tampa Bay Rowdies
10	MF	Paul Caligiuri	9 March 1964 (aged 25)		(West Germany) SV Meppen
11	MF	John Stollmeyer	25 October 1962 (aged 26)	28	(United States) Arizona Condors
12	DF	John Doyle	16 March 1966 (aged 23)		(United States) S.F. Bay Blackhawks
13	DF	Brian Bliss	28 September 1965 (aged 23)	23	(United States) Albany Capitals
14	MF	Chris Henderson	11 December 1970 (aged 18)	5	(United States) UCLA Bruins
15	MF	Neil Covone	31 August 1969 (aged 19)	5	(United States) Wake Forest Demon Deacons
16	DF	Desmond Armstrong	2 November 1964 (aged 24)	14	(United States) Baltimore Blast
17	MF	John Harkes	8 March 1967 (aged 22)	28	(United States) Albany Capitals
18	MF	Tab Ramos	21 September 1966 (aged 22)	23	(United States) Miami Sharks
19	MF	Ted Eck	14 July 1966 (aged 22)		(United States) Ottawa Intrepid
20	FW	Hugo Perez	8 November 1963 (aged 25)		(France) Red Star
21	FW	Bruce Murray	25 January 1966 (aged 23)		(Switzerland) Luzern
22	FW	Peter Vermes	21 November 1966 (aged 22)		(Hungary) Rába ETO
23	FW	Eric Eichmann	7 May 1965 (aged 23)		(Greece) AEK Athens
24	FW	Brent Goulet	19 June 1964 (aged 24)		(United States) Seattle Storm
25	FW	Phillip Gyau	7 February 1966 (aged 23)		(United States) Maryland Bays
26	FW	Jim Gabarra	22 September 1959 (aged 29)		(United States) Los Angeles Heat
27	FW	George Pastor	23 November 1963 (aged 25)		(United States) S.F. Bay Blackhawks
28	FW	Eric Wynalda	9 June 1969 (aged 19)		(United States) S.F. Bay Blackhawks
