= Zambia at the 1988 Summer Olympics =

- IOC code: ZAM
- NOC: National Olympic Committee of Zambia

in Seoul, South Korea 17 September–2 October 1988
- Competitors: 29 in 3 sports
- Flag bearer: Douglas Kalembo
- Officials: 11
- Medals: Gold 0 Silver 0 Bronze 0 Total 0

Summer Olympics appearances (overview)
- 1964; 1968; 1972; 1976; 1980; 1984; 1988; 1992; 1996; 2000; 2004; 2008; 2012; 2016; 2020; 2024

Other related appearances
- Rhodesia (1960)

Zambia competed at the 1988 Summer Olympics in Seoul, South Korea.

== Competitors ==
The following is the list of number of competitors in the Games.

| Sport | Men | Women | Total |
|---|---|---|---|
| Athletics | 4 | 0 | 4 |
| Boxing | 7 | – | 7 |
| Football | 18 | – | 18 |
| Total | 29 | 0 | 29 |

== Athletics ==
Men
Track & road events

| Athlete | Event | Heat | | Quarterfinal | | Semifinal | | Final | |
| Athlete | Event | Result | Rank | Result | Rank | Result | Rank | Result | Rank |
|---|---|---|---|---|---|---|---|---|---|
| Jonathan Chipalo | 400 m | 48.97 | 6 | did not advance | | | | | |
| Douglas Kalembo | 400 m | 47.44 | 4 | did not advance | | | | | |
| Samuel Matete | 400 m hurdles | 51.06 | 6 | did not advance | | | | | |
| Enock Musonda | 400 m | 49.21 | 7 | did not advance | | | | | |
| Douglas Kalembo; Enock Musonda; Jonathan Chipalo; Samuel Matete | 4 × 400 m relay | 3:11.35 | 7 | did not advance | | | | | |

== Boxing ==
Men

| Athlete | Event | 1 Round | 2 Round | 3 Round | Quarterfinals | Semifinals | Final | |
| Athlete | Event | Opposition Result | Opposition Result | Opposition Result | Opposition Result | Opposition Result | Opposition Result | Rank |
|---|---|---|---|---|---|---|---|---|
| Thomas Chisenga | Light Flyweight | BYE | Liu Hsin-Hung (TPE); W 4-1 | Mahjoub Mjirich (MAR); L 0-5 | did not advance | | | |
| Joseph Chongo | Flyweight | BYE | Manoj Pingale (IND); L 0-5 | did not advance | | | | |
| Justin Chikwanda | Bantamweight | Thomas Stevens (LBR); W RSC-1 | Moumouni Siuley (NIG); W RSC-1 | Katsuyoki Matsushima (JPN); L 2-3 | did not advance | | | |
| Patrick Mwamba (Note: also competed at the 1984 Summer Olympics) | Featherweight | Esteban Flores (PUR); L 1-4 | did not advance | | | | | |
| Lameck Mbao | Lightweight | Azzedine Said (ALG); L TKO-2 | did not advance | | | | | |
| Anthony Mwamba | Light Welterweight | Kunihiro Miura (JPN); W 5-0 | Anoumou Aguiar (TOG); W RSC-1 | Lyton Mphande (MAW); W TKO-2 | Vyacheslav Yanovski (URS); L 0-5 | did not advance | | 5 |
| Dimus Chisala | Welterweight | Wanderley Oliveira (BRA); W RSC-2 | Vladimir Ereshchenko (URS); W RSC-1 | Joni Nyman (FIN); L 0-5 | did not advance | | | |

== Football ==
=== Group B ===
| Team | Pld | W | D | L | GF | GA | GD | Pts |
|---|---|---|---|---|---|---|---|---|
| Zambia | 3 | 2 | 1 | 0 | 10 | 2 | +8 | 5 |
| Italy | 3 | 2 | 0 | 1 | 7 | 6 | +1 | 4 |
| Iraq | 3 | 1 | 1 | 1 | 5 | 4 | +1 | 3 |
| Guatemala | 3 | 0 | 0 | 3 | 2 | 12 | −10 | 0 |

September 17, 1988

| Zambia | 2–2 | Iraq |

Daejeon Hanbat Stadium, Daejeon

September 19, 1988

| Zambia | 4–0 | Italy |

Gwangju Mudeung Stadium, Gwangju

September 21, 1988

| Zambia | 4–0 | Guatemala |

Gwangju Mudeung Stadium, Gwangju

=== Quarter-finals ===
September 25, 1988

| West Germany | 4–0 | Zambia |

Gwangju Mudeung Stadium, Gwangju
Attendance: 8,000
Referee: Jesús Díaz

==== Team roster ====
- ( 1.) David Chabala
- ( 2.) Peter Mwanza
- ( 3.) Edmon Mumba
- ( 4.) Samuel Chomba
- ( 5.) James Chitalu
- ( 6.) Derby Makinka
- ( 7.) Johnson Bwalya
- ( 8.) Charles Musonda
- ( 9.) Beston Chambeshi
- (10.) Webster Chikabala
- (11.) Lucky Msiska
- (12.) Kalusha Bwalya
- (13.) Simon Mwansa
- (14.) Manfred Chabinga
- (15.) Ashols Melu
- (16.) Richard Mwanza
- (17.) Pearson Mwanza
- (18.) Wisdom Mumba Chansa
- (19.) Stone Nyirenda
- (20.) Eston Mulenga

Head Coach: Samuel Ndhlovu
