= 1985 CONCACAF Championship squads =

These are the squads for the countries that played in the 1985 CONCACAF Championship.

The age listed for each player is on 24 February 1985, the first day of the tournament. The numbers of caps and goals listed for each player do not include any matches played after the start of the tournament. The club listed is the club for which the player last played a competitive match before the tournament. The nationality for each club reflects the national association (not the league) to which the club is affiliated. A flag is included for coaches who are of a different nationality than their own national team.

El Salvador (3), Honduras (4), Canada (13), Guatemala (1) and Trinidad and Tobago had players representing foreign clubs.

== Group 1 ==
=== El Salvador ===
Head coach: (Argentina) Juan Quartarone

No.	Pos.	Player	Date of birth (age)	Caps	Club
1	GK	José Luis Munguía	28 October 1959 (aged 25)	?	(El Salvador) FAS
2	GK	Luis Guevara Mora	2 September 1961 (aged 23)		(El Salvador) Águila
3	DF	José Francisco Jovel	26 May 1951 (aged 33)	0	(El Salvador) Águila
4	MF	Mauricio Alfaro	13 February 1956 (aged 29)	0	(El Salvador) FAS
5	DF	Jorge Ábrego	13 February 1956 (aged 29)	0	(El Salvador) FAS
6	DF	Marcial Turcios	13 March 1958 (aged 26)	0	(El Salvador) Atlético Marte
7	DF	Thomas Lucero	6 July 1960 (aged 24)	0	(El Salvador) FAS
8	MF	Jaime Rodríguez	17 January 1959 (aged 26)	0	(Mexico) León
9	FW	Luis Ramírez Zapata	6 January 1954 (aged 31)	0	(El Salvador) Águila
10	DF	Ramón Fagoaga	12 January 1952 (aged 33)	0	(El Salvador) Atlético Marte
11	MF	José Luis Rugamas	5 June 1953 (aged 31)	0	(El Salvador) FAS
12	MF	Luis Atilio Estrada	22 July 1961 (aged 23)	0	(El Salvador) FAS
13	MF	Julio Herrera Díaz	8 July 1965 (aged 19)	0	(El Salvador) UES
14	MF	Dagoberto López	10 May 1963 (aged 21)	0	(El Salvador) Independiente
15	MF	Mauricio Perla	19 September 1958 (aged 26)	0	(El Salvador) Atlético Marte
16	FW	Norberto Huezo (captain)	6 June 1956 (aged 28)	0	(Spain) Cartagena
17	FW	Mágico González	13 March 1958 (aged 26)	0	(Spain) Real Valladolid
18	FW	José María Rivas	12 May 1958 (aged 26)	0	(El Salvador) Independiente
19	FW	Ever Hernández	11 December 1958 (aged 26)	0	(El Salvador) FAS
20	FW	Wilfredo Huezo	20 July 1960 (aged 24)	0	(El Salvador) Atlético Marte
21	FW	Carlos Humberto Vargas	16 August 1960 (aged 24)	0	(El Salvador) FAS

=== Honduras ===
Head coach: Chelato Uclés

No.	Pos.	Player	Date of birth (age)	Caps	Club
1	GK	Julio César Arzú	5 June 1954 (aged 30)	0	(Honduras) Real España
2	GK	Belarmino Rivera	5 February 1956 (aged 29)		(Honduras) Olimpia
3	GK	Salomón Nazar	7 September 1953 (aged 31)	?	(Honduras) Vida
4	DF	Allan Costly	13 December 1954 (aged 30)	0	(Honduras) Real España
5	DF	Daniel Zapata	22 March 1959 (aged 25)	?	(Honduras) Olimpia
6	DF	Efraín Gutiérrez	7 May 1954 (aged 30)	0	(Honduras) Vida
7	DF	Domingo Drummond	14 April 1957 (aged 27)	0	(Honduras) Platense
8	DF	Jaime Villegas	5 July 1950 (aged 34)	0	(Honduras) Real España
9	MF	Francisco Toledo	30 September 1959 (aged 25)	?	(Honduras) Marathón
10	MF	Gilberto Yearwood	15 March 1956 (aged 28)	0	(Spain) Celta de Vigo
11	MF	Ramón Maradiaga (captain)	30 October 1954 (aged 30)	0	(El Salvador) Alianza
12	MF	Juan Carlos Espinoza	24 August 1958 (aged 26)		(Honduras) Olimpia
13	MF	Danilo Galindo	4 March 1963 (aged 21)		(Honduras) Vida
14	MF	Juan Cruz Murillo	24 June 1959 (aged 25)	0	(Honduras) Pumas UNAH
15	MF	Roberto Bailey	10 August 1952 (aged 32)	?	(Honduras) Real España
16	MF	Matilde Lacayo	1957 (aged 28)	?	(Honduras) Vida
17	MF	Salvador Bernárdez	6 January 1954 (aged 31)	?	(Honduras) Free agent
18	FW	José Figueroa	15 December 1959 (aged 25)	0	(Spain) Real Murcia
19	FW	Celso Güity	7 August 1955 (aged 29)	?	(Honduras) Olimpia
20	FW	Eduardo Laing	27 December 1958 (aged 26)		(Honduras) Platense
21	MF	Carlos Caballero	5 December 1958 (aged 26)	0	(Honduras) Olimpia
22	FW	Porfirio Betancourt	10 October 1957 (aged 27)	0	(United States) St. Louis Steamers
23	FW	José Enrique Mendoza	2 December 1955 (aged 29)	0	(Honduras) Vida
24	FW	Richardson Smith	24 February 1963 (aged 22)	?	(Honduras) Marathón

=== Suriname ===
Head coach: Walther Braithwaite

No.	Pos.	Player	Date of birth (age)	Caps	Club
1	GK	Carlo Montpellier			(Suriname) Transvaal
2	GK	Roy Belfor			(Suriname) Voorwaarts
3	GK	Guno Yvent			(Suriname)
4	DF	Ruben Nijhs			(Suriname)
5	DF	Siegmar Nora			(Suriname)
6	DF	Floyd Griffith			(Suriname)
7	DF	Regeillo Doest			(Suriname)
8	MF	Kenneth Borgia	10 June 1960 (aged 24)		(Suriname) Leo Victor
9	MF	Umberto Klinker			(Suriname) Leo Victor
10	MF	Siegfried Rustenberg			(Suriname)
11	MF	Delano Rigters	31 December 1956 (aged 28)		(Suriname) Robinhood
12	MF	Ludwig Simson	20 December 1963 (aged 21)		(Suriname)
13	MF	Johan Leisberg			(Suriname)
14	MF	Jacob Eduards			(Suriname)
15	FW	Rinaldo Entingh	9 June 1954 (aged 30)		(Suriname) Robinhood
16	FW	Frank Westenburg			(Suriname)
17	FW	Kenneth Stjeward			(Suriname) Robinhood
18	FW	Dennis Wyks			(Suriname)
19	FW	Kenneth Francis	9 December 1964 (aged 20)		(Suriname)
20	FW	Yan Voorn			(Suriname)

== Group 2 ==
=== Canada ===
Head coach: (England) Tony Waiters

No.	Pos.	Player	Date of birth (age)	Caps	Club
1	GK	Paul Dolan	16 April 1966 (aged 18)		Free agent
2	GK	Sven Habermann	3 November 1961 (aged 23)		Free agent
3	GK	Tino Lettieri	27 September 1957 (aged 27)		(United States) Minnesota Strikers
4	MF	Randy Ragan	7 June 1959 (aged 25)		Free agent
5	DF	Randy Samuel	23 December 1963 (aged 21)		(Canada) Edmonton Eagles
6	DF	Bob Lenarduzzi	1 May 1955 (aged 29)		(United States) Tacoma Stars
7	DF	Ian Bridge	18 September 1959 (aged 25)		(United States) Tacoma Stars
8	DF	Shaun Lowther	24 January 1962 (aged 23)		(England) Blyth Spartans
9	DF	Terry Moore	2 June 1958 (aged 26)	11	(Northern Ireland) Glentoran
10	DF	Trevor McCallum	26 February 1964 (aged 20)		(Canada) Toronto Inex
11	DF	Bruce Wilson (captain)	20 June 1951 (aged 33)		(Canada) Toronto Inex
12	MF	Pasquale de Luca	26 May 1962 (aged 22)		(United States) Cleveland Force
13	MF	Mark Karpun	12 July 1963 (aged 21)		(United States) Dallas Sidekicks
14	MF	Mike Sweeney	25 December 1959 (aged 25)	26	(United States) Cleveland Force
15	MF	Iain Baird	1 January 1963 (aged 22)		(Canada) Victoria Riptides
16	MF	David Norman	6 May 1962 (aged 22)		(United States) Tacoma Stars
17	MF	Paul James	11 November 1963 (aged 21)		Free agent
18	MF	Gerry Gray	20 January 1961 (aged 24)	22	(United States) Chicago Sting
19	FW	John Catliff	8 January 1965 (aged 20)		(Canada) Toronto Inex
20	FW	Drew Ferguson	9 November 1957 (aged 27)		(United States) New York Cosmos
21	FW	George Pakos	14 August 1952 (aged 32)	22	(Canada) Victoria Riptides
22	FW	Carl Valentine	4 July 1958 (aged 26)	3	(England) West Bromwich Albion
23	FW	Dale Mitchell	21 April 1958 (aged 26)	26	(United States) Tacoma Stars
24	FW	Ken Garraway	12 December 1957 (aged 27)	26	(Canada) Victoria Riptides
25	FW	Igor Vrablic	19 July 1965 (aged 19)	27	(Belgium) Seraing

=== Guatemala ===
Head Coach: (Socialist Federal Republic of Yugoslavia) Dragoslav Šekularac

No.	Pos.	Player	Date of birth (age)	Caps	Club
1	GK	Ricardo Jérez	6 August 1956 (aged 28)		(Guatemala) Comunicaciones
2	GK	Pepp Castro	13 April 1957 (aged 27)		(Guatemala) Juventud Retalteca
3	DF	Víctor Hugo Monzón	12 November 1957 (aged 27)		(Guatemala) Aurora
4	DF	Allan Wellman	26 May 1954 (aged 30)		(Guatemala) Aurora
5	DF	Sergio Rivera	28 November 1955 (aged 29)		(Guatemala) Municipal
6	DF	Julio Gómez	28 October 1954 (aged 30)		(Guatemala) Aurora
7	DF	Luis Guillermo Rodríguez	1959 (aged 26)		(Guatemala) Municipal
8	MF	Juan Manuel Funes	16 May 1956 (aged 28)		(Guatemala) Aurora
9	MF	Kevin Sandoval	18 August 1959 (aged 25)		(Guatemala) Comunicaciones
10	MF	Juan Pérez Monge	1957 (aged 28)		(Guatemala) Comunicaciones
11	MF	Eddy Alburez	29 June 1960 (aged 24)		(Guatemala) Galcasa
12	MF	Selvin Galindo	24 December 1957 (aged 27)		(Guatemala) Xelajú
13	MF	Ernesto Almengor			(Guatemala) Comunicaciones
14	MF	Saúl Carías			(Guatemala) Juventud Escuintleca
15	MF	Zancudo Estrada	1963 (aged 22)		(Guatemala) Xelajú
16	MF	Erwin Donis	3 August 1963 (aged 21)		(Guatemala) Municipal
17	FW	Raúl Chacón	8 April 1964 (aged 20)		(Guatemala) Comunicaciones
18	FW	Alfredo Solórzano	15 January 1956 (aged 29)		(Guatemala) Suchitepéquez
19	FW	Byron Pérez	18 March 1959 (aged 25)		(Guatemala) Comunicaciones
20	FW	Adán Paniagua	30 November 1955 (aged 29)		(El Salvador) Alianza
21	FW	Alejandro Ortíz	1 August 1955 (aged 29)		(Guatemala) Suchitepéquez

=== Haiti ===
Head Coach: Claude Barthélemy

No.	Pos.	Player	Date of birth (age)	Caps	Club
1	GK	Louisthelmy Demeuranty			(Haiti) Aigle Noir
2	GK	Elias Séjour			(Haiti) Racing Haïtien
3	GK	Frantz Lefeyere			(Haiti)
4	DF	Daniel Cadet	4 January 1960 (aged 25)		(Haiti) Racing Haïtien
5	DF	Jean-Robert Cadet			(Haiti) Violette
6	DF	Jean-Claude Moise			(Haiti)
7	DF	Selin Sainsou			(Haiti)
8	DF	André François			(Haiti)
9	DF	Donet Désilus			(Haiti)
10	MF	Françen Alexandre			(Haiti)
11	MF	Antoine Eleazard			(Haiti)
12	MF	Jean Paul Pierre			(Haiti)
13	MF	Eric Auguste			(Haiti)
14	MF	Eddy Nizieuk			(Haiti)
15	FW	Jean-Joseph Mathelier			(Haiti) Violette
16	FW	Kelsin Thomas			(Haiti) Aigle Noir
17	FW	Fritz Bobo			(Haiti) Aigle Noir
18	FW	Maxime Auguste			(Haiti) Don Bosco
19	FW	Henry Claude Charmant			(Haiti) Violette
20	FW	James Bolté			(Haiti)
21	FW	Richard Legagneur			(Haiti) Violette
22	FW	Frantz Toussaint	2 November 1948 (aged 36)		(Haiti)

== Group 3 ==
=== Costa Rica ===
Head coach: (Brazil) Odir Jacques and (Costa Rica) Álvaro Grant

No.	Pos.	Player	Date of birth (age)	Caps	Club
1	GK	Marco Antonio Rojas	8 November 1952 (aged 32)		(Costa Rica) Saprissa
2	GK	Alejandro González	3 March 1955 (aged 29)		(Costa Rica) Alajuelense
3	GK	Román González			(Costa Rica) Ramonense
4	GK	Carlos Porras			(Costa Rica) Alajuelense
5	DF	Minor Alpízar	27 September 1953 (aged 31)		(Costa Rica) Alajuelense
6	DF	Enrique Díaz	23 February 1959 (aged 26)		(Costa Rica) Saprissa
7	DF	Miguel Simpson	25 September 1955 (aged 29)		(Costa Rica) Herediano
8	DF	Mauricio Montero	19 October 1963 (aged 21)		(Costa Rica) Alajuelense
9	DF	Edwin Salazar	7 August 1962 (aged 22)		(Costa Rica) Cartaginés
10	DF	Luis Raquel Ledezma	1 April 1959 (aged 25)		(Costa Rica) Alajuelense
11	DF	Róger Flores	26 May 1959 (aged 25)		(Costa Rica) Alajuelense
12	DF	César Hines	13 July 1958 (aged 26)		(Costa Rica) Alajuelense
13	DF	William Guillén			(Costa Rica) Alajuelense
14	DF	Tomás Segura	10 February 1963 (aged 22)		(Costa Rica) Alajuelense
15	DF	Freddy Méndez	7 July 1957 (aged 27)		(Costa Rica) Saprissa
16	MF	Álvaro Solano	25 June 1961 (aged 23)		(Costa Rica) Alajuelense
17	MF	Tomás Velásquez	18 December 1957 (aged 27)		(Costa Rica) Herediano
18	MF	Óscar Ramírez	8 December 1964 (aged 20)		(Costa Rica) Alajuelense
19	MF	Omar Arroyo	22 November 1956 (aged 28)		(Costa Rica) Alajuelense
20	MF	Luis Galagarza	15 August 1963 (aged 21)		(Costa Rica) Puntarenas
21	MF	Juan Cayasso	24 June 1961 (aged 23)		(Costa Rica) Alajuelense
22	MF	Germán Chavarría	19 March 1958 (aged 26)	3	(Costa Rica) Herediano
23	MF	Alexandre Guimarães	7 November 1959 (aged 25)	0	(Costa Rica) Saprissa
24	MF	Rodolfo Mills (captain)	25 May 1958 (aged 26)	0	(Costa Rica) Alajuelense
25	MF	Jorge Chévez	29 June 1958 (aged 26)	0	(Costa Rica) Alajuelense
26	MF	Álvaro Castro	6 June 1961 (aged 23)	0	(Costa Rica) Alajuelense
27	MF	Franklin Williams	12 November 1959 (aged 25)	0	(Costa Rica) Alajuelense
28	FW	Johnny Williams	9 June 1954 (aged 30)	0	(Costa Rica) Puntarenas
29	FW	Marvin Obando	4 April 1960 (aged 24)	0	(Costa Rica) Herediano
30	FW	Nilton Nóbrega	24 December 1955 (aged 29)	0	(Costa Rica) Herediano
31	FW	Jorge Ulate	14 April 1956 (aged 28)	0	(Costa Rica) Alajuelense
32	FW	Evaristo Coronado	13 September 1960 (aged 24)	0	(Costa Rica) Saprissa
33	FW	Claudio Jara	6 May 1959 (aged 25)	0	(Costa Rica) Herediano
34	FW	Leonidas Flores	24 January 1965 (aged 20)	0	(Costa Rica) Puntarenas
35	FW	Jorge Contreras		0	(Costa Rica) Alajuelense

=== Trinidad and Tobago ===
Head coach: Roderick Warne

No.	Pos.	Player	Date of birth (age)	Caps	Club
1	GK	Errol Lovell	25 February 1962 (aged 22)		(Trinidad and Tobago) Defence Force
2	GK	Hayden Thomas			(Trinidad and Tobago) Defence Force
3	GK	Michael Maurice (captain)	11 November 1957 (aged 27)		(Trinidad and Tobago) Police
4	DF	Clayton Morris	5 June 1962 (aged 22)		(Trinidad and Tobago) Aviation Services Limited
5	DF	Julien García			(Trinidad and Tobago) Defence Force
6	DF	Francis Furlonge			(Trinidad and Tobago) Defence Force
7	MF	Andy Pope			(Trinidad and Tobago)
8	DF	Bertram O'Brien			(Trinidad and Tobago) Defence Force
9	DF	Perec Lewis			(Trinidad and Tobago)
10	DF	Garnet Craig			(Trinidad and Tobago) Trintoc
11	MF	Curtis Murrell			(Trinidad and Tobago) Defence Force
12	DF	Kelvin Jones	2 January 1962 (aged 23)		(Trinidad and Tobago) Police
13	MF	Anthony Streete	31 January 1959 (aged 26)		(Trinidad and Tobago) Trintoc
14	MF	Mike Christopher			(Trinidad and Tobago)
15	MF	Nevick de Noon			(Trinidad and Tobago) Defence Force
16	MF	Clyde de Noon			(Trinidad and Tobago)
17	MF	Steve Pompey			(Trinidad and Tobago)
18	MF	Eric Gill			(Trinidad and Tobago)
19	MF	Alan Anderson			(Trinidad and Tobago) Aviation Services Limited
20	MF	Winston Phillips	8 February 1945 (aged 40)		(Trinidad and Tobago) Paragon
21	MF	Adrian Fonrose	3 January 1964 (aged 21)		(Trinidad and Tobago) Trintoc
22	FW	Philibert Jones	12 November 1964 (aged 20)		(Trinidad and Tobago) Trintoc
23	FW	Wendell Moore	17 September 1964 (aged 20)		(United States) Fairleigh Dickinson Knights
24	FW	Miguel Hackett			(Trinidad and Tobago) Defence Force
25	FW	Steve Pierre			(Trinidad and Tobago) ECM Motown
26	FW	Larry Joseph	3 April 1964 (aged 20)		(Trinidad and Tobago) Trintoc

=== United States ===
Head coach: Bob Gansler

No.	Pos.	Player	Date of birth (age)	Caps	Club
1	GK	David Brcic	29 January 1958 (aged 27)		(United States) Wichita Wings
2	GK	Arnie Mausser	28 February 1954 (aged 30)		(United States) Kansas City Comets
3	DF	Erhardt Kapp	19 June 1959 (aged 25)		(United States) Pittsburgh Spirit
4	DF	Dan Canter	16 November 1961 (aged 23)		(United States) Chicago Sting
5	DF	Jeff Durgan	29 August 1961 (aged 23)		(United States) New York Cosmos
6	DF	Gregg Thompson	4 August 1969 (aged 15)		(United States) Minnesota Strikers
7	MF	Paul Caligiuri	9 March 1964 (aged 20)		(United States) UCLA Bruins
8	DF	Mike Windischmann	6 December 1965 (aged 19)		(United States) Adelphi Panthers
9	DF	Kevin Crow	17 September 1961 (aged 23)		(United States) San Diego Sockers
10	MF	Mike Fox	24 September 1961 (aged 23)		(United States) Las Vegas Americans
11	MF	Eddie Radwanski	5 May 1963 (aged 21)		(United States) Dallas Sidekicks
12	MF	Perry Van der Beck	5 November 1959 (aged 25)		(United States) Dallas Sidekicks
13	MF	Charlie Fajkus	4 March 1957 (aged 27)		(United States) Chicago Sting
14	MF	Angelo DiBernardo	16 May 1955 (aged 29)		(United States) New York Cosmos
15	MF	Chico Borja	24 August 1959 (aged 25)		(United States) Las Vegas Americans
16	MF	Rick Davis (captain)	24 November 1958 (aged 26)		(United States) St. Louis Steamers
17	FW	Hugo Pérez	8 November 1963 (aged 21)		(United States) San Diego Sockers
18	FW	Mark Peterson	18 April 1960 (aged 24)		(United States) Tacoma Stars
19	FW	Jeff Hooker	21 March 1965 (aged 19)		(United States) UCLA Bruins
20	FW	John Kerr Jr.	6 March 1965 (aged 19)		(United States) Duke Blue Devils
