= Football at the 1988 Summer Olympics – Men's African Qualifiers =

1988 Summer Olympics – Men's Football African Qualifiers
- Dates: 16 November 1986 – 31 January 1988

This page provides the summaries of the matches of the qualifying rounds for the Football at the 1988 Summer Olympics to be held in Seoul. Three countries qualified.

== Preliminary round ==
Team 1	Agg.	Team 2	1st leg	2nd leg
Rwanda	2–8	Malawi	2–5	0–3
Botswana	w/o	Madagascar	—	—
Swaziland	w/o	Mauritius	—	—

16 November 1986

Rwanda	2–5	Malawi
Goal		Sinalo; Malunga ?

Amahoro Stadium, Kigali
30 November 1986

Malawi	3–0	Rwanda
Sinalo; Kayira

Stade des Jeunes, Lilongwe

== First round ==
Team 1	Agg.	Team 2	1st leg	2nd leg
Botswana	0–7	Zambia	0–4	0–3
Egypt	7–1	Kenya	4–0	3–1
Ghana	3–0	Senegal	2–0	1–0
Liberia	3–5	Nigeria	2–1	1–4
Malawi	1–4	Cameroon	1–1	0–3
Sierra Leone	1–2	Tunisia	1–0	0–2
Swaziland	1–8	Zimbabwe	0–2	1–6
Sudan	2–4	Algeria	1–1	1–3
Uganda	6–2	Mozambique	4–1	2–1
Ivory Coast	w/o	Guinea	—	—
Libya	w/o	Ethiopia	—	—
Morocco	w/o	Gambia	—	—

13 June 1987

Botswana	0–4	Zambia
		Simukonda; Kazika; Msiska; Makinka (pen.)

Botswana National Stadium, Gaborone
Referee: Eganaden Cadressen (Mauritius)
21 June 1987

Zambia	3–0	Botswana
Melu; Nyirenda

Independence Stadium, Lusaka
Referee: Kambaji Kabongo (Zaire)

27 June 1987

Egypt	4–0	Kenya
Ramadan 22', 67', 70'; Abdel-Hameed 60'

Cairo International Stadium, Cairo
Referee: Neji Jouini (Tunisia)
12 July 1987

Kenya	1–3	Egypt
Oyiela 49'		Gharieb 5', 36'; Abdel-Hameed 57'

Kasarani Stadium, Nairobi
Referee: Getachew Gebremarian (Ethiopia)

28 June 1987

Ghana	2–0	Senegal
Gyamfi

Kumasi Sports Stadium, Kumasi
Referee: Gaston Engoua (Congo)
11 July 1987

Senegal	0–1	Ghana
		Arthur

Stade Léopold Sédar Senghor, Dakar
Referee: Mark Dormoh (Liberia)

28 June 1987

Liberia	2–1	Nigeria
Jallah		Siasia

SKD Stadium, Monrovia
Referee: Karim Camara (Guinea)
11 July 1987

Nigeria	4–1	Liberia
Siasia; Nwosu		Debbah

Surulere Stadium, Lagos
Referee: Célestin N'Cho (Ivory Coast)

27 June 1987

Malawi	1–1	Cameroon
Waya		Kana-Biyik

Civo Stadium, Lilongwe
Referee: Kabalamuna Chayu (Zambia)
12 July 1987

Cameroon	3–0	Malawi
Kundé 46'; Tataw 63'; Kana-Biyik 87'

Ahmadou Ahidjo Stadium, Yaoundé
Referee: Dodji Mawuk Hounnaké-Kouassi (Togo)

16 May 1987

Sierra Leone	1–0	Tunisia
Thomas 25'

Siaka Steven Stadium, Freetown
Referee: Badara Sène (Senegal)
31 May 1987

Tunisia	2–0	Sierra Leone
Jbara 4'; Rakbaoui 59'

Stade El Menzah, Tunis
Referee: Abderrahmane Bergui (Algeria)

7 June 1987

Swaziland	0–2	Zimbabwe
		Ndunduma; Tauro

Somhlolo National Stadium, Lobamba
Referee: Lele Sebele (Botswana)
21 June 1987

Zimbabwe	6–1	Swaziland
Tauro; Khumalo; Chunga; Makanza		Dube

Rufaro Stadium, Harare
Referee: Bester Kalombo (Malawi)

28 June 1987

Sudan	1–1	Algeria
Ezzeldin 82'		Boukar 70'

Khartoum Stadium, Khartoum
Referee: Mohamed Hossam El-Din (Egypt)
10 July 1987

Algeria	3–1 (a.e.t.)	Sudan
Menad 85', 119'; Sandjak 97'		Mohammed 15'

19 May Stadium, Annaba
Attendance: 60,000
Referee: Baba Laouissi (Morocco)

27 June 1987

Uganda	4–1	Mozambique
Musisi; Omondi		Chiquinho Conde

Nakivubo Stadium, Kampala
Referee: Osman Mohamud Halane (Somalia)
12 July 1987

Mozambique	1–2	Uganda

Rufaro Stadium, Maputo
Referee: Guy Rakotoarison (Madagascar)

== Second round ==
Team 1	Agg.	Team 2	1st leg	2nd leg
Ghana	2–2 (a)	Cameroon	0–0	2–2
Ivory Coast	1–2	Morocco	0–0	1–2
Tunisia	1–0	Egypt	0–0	1–0
Uganda	2–6	Zambia	2–1	0–5
Zimbabwe	0–2	Nigeria	0–0	0–2
Algeria	w/o	Libya	—	—

4 October 1987

Ghana	0–0	Cameroon

Kumasi Sports Stadium, Kumasi
Referee: Idrissa Sarr (Mauritania)
14 November 1987

Cameroon	2–2	Ghana
Milla 32'; Omam-Biyik 82'		Tegoe 18'; Ebo 54'

Ahmadou Ahidjo Stadium, Yaoundé
Referee: Mark Dormoh (Liberia)

1 November 1987

Ivory Coast	0–0	Morocco

Stade Félix Houphouët-Boigny, Abidjan
Referee: Simon Bantsimba (Congo)
15 November 1987

Morocco	2–1	Ivory Coast
El Haddaoui 28' (pen.); El Biyaz 86'		Turbo 78'

Stade Mohammed V, Casablanca
Attendance: Abderrahmane Bergui (Algeria)

4 October 1987

Tunisia	0–0	Egypt

Stade El Menzah, Tunis
Referee: Baba Laouissi (Morocco)
13 November 1987

Egypt	0–1 (a.e.t.)	Tunisia
		Limam 109'

Cairo International Stadium, Cairo
Referee: Badara Sène (Senegal)

3 October 1987

Uganda	2–1	Zambia
Musisi 55'; Vvubya 59'		Melu 87'

Nakivubo Stadium, Kampala
Referee: Tesfaye Gebreyesus (Ethiopia)
15 November 1987

Zambia	5–0	Uganda
Kabugo 50' (o.g.); Siame 56', 64'; Nyirenda 65', 72'

Independence Stadium, Lusaka
Referee: Bester Kalombo (Malawi)

4 October 1987

Zimbabwe	0–0	Nigeria

Rufaro Stadium, Harare
Referee: Ali Tahir Hafidh (Tanzania)
17 October 1987

Nigeria	2–0	Zimbabwe
Okosieme; Edobor

Surulere Stadium, Lagos
Referee: Dodji Mawuk Hounnaké-Kouassi (Togo)

== Third round ==
Team 1	Agg.	Team 2	1st leg	2nd leg
Algeria	1–2	Nigeria	1–0	0–2
Tunisia	3–2	Morocco	1–0	2–2
Zambia	2–1	Ghana	2–0	0–1

15 January 1988

Algeria	1–0	Nigeria
Oudjani 47'

19 May Stadium, Annaba
Attendance: 70,000
Referee: Jean-Fidèle Diramba (Gabon)
30 January 1988

Nigeria	2–0 (a.e.t.)	Algeria
Adeshina 32'; Nwosu 114'

Nnamdi Azikiwe Stadium, Enugu
Attendance: 35,000
Referee: Mohamed Hafez (Egypt)

17 January 1988

Tunisia	1–0	Morocco
Dhiab 15'

Stade El Menzah, Tunis
Attendance: 40,000
Referee: Mohamed Hansal (Algeria)
30 January 1988

Morocco	2–2	Tunisia
Khairi 26'; Krimau 32'		Jabrane 19' (o.g.); Dhiab 90'

Moulay Abdellah Stadium, Rabat
Attendance: 50,000
Referee: Badara Sène (Senegal)

17 January 1988

Zambia	2–0	Ghana
Chansa (?); Bwalya 73'

Independence Stadium, Lusaka
Referee: ()
31 January 1988

Ghana	1–0	Zambia
Yeboah 17'

Ohene Djan Stadium, Accra
Referee: ()

Nigeria, Tunisia and Zambia qualified.
