= Ricardo Jérez =

Ricardo Jérez may refer to:

- Ricardo Jérez (footballer, born 1956), Guatemalan football goalkeeper
- Ricardo Jérez (footballer, born 1986), Guatemalan football goalkeeper, and son of above footballer
