= 1989 CONCACAF Championship qualification =

Regional association football event

Tournament details
- Dates: 17 April – 6 October 1988
- Teams: 15 (from 1 confederation)

Tournament statistics
- Matches played: 18
- Goals scored: 41 (2.28 per match)

The 1989 CONCACAF Championship qualification competition was the qualifying contest to decide the finalists for the 1989 CONCACAF Championship – the 10th international association football championship for members of the Confederation of North, Central America and Caribbean Association Football (CONCACAF). It was the last edition of the CONCACAF Championship which would be replaced by the CONCACAF Gold Cup. Qualifying ran from 17 April – 6 October 1988 and was contested by the national teams of 15 CONCACAF member associations. The competition doubled as the qualification competition for the 1990 FIFA World Cup.

Unlike the previous edition, no teams qualified automatically. Five teams – United States, Guatemala, Trinidad and Tobago, El Salvador and Costa Rica – qualified for the final tournament.

== Background ==
The Confederation of North, Central America and Caribbean Association Football (CONCACAF) was founded as a merger of the Confederación Centroamericana y del Caribe de Fútbol (CCCF) and North American Football Confederation (NAFC) in 1961. The first CONCACAF Championship, in which all the competing nations qualified automatically, was held in 1963. A qualifying competition was introduced from the second edition in 1965. From 1973, the competition doubled as the qualifying competition for the FIFA World Cup for teams in North, Central America and the Caribbean. Only the winner of each edition would qualify for the World Cup.

== Format ==
Five of the 15 teams received a bye to the second round. The remaining 10 teams were drawn into five two-legged ties. The team scoring more goals on aggregate in each tie would advance to the second round. In the second round, the 10 teams were drawn into five two-legged ties. The team scoring more goals on aggregate in each tie would qualify for the final tournament.

=== Participants ===
- Antigua and Barbuda
- Canada
- Costa Rica
- Cuba
- El Salvador
- Guatemala
- Guyana
- Honduras
- Jamaica
- Netherlands Antilles
- Panama
- Puerto Rico
- Trinidad and Tobago
- United States

== First round ==
Canada, Honduras, El Salvador, the United States and Mexico received a bye to the second round.

The first round began on 17 April when Trinidad and Tobago defeated Guyana 4–0 in the first leg. On 30 April, Guatemala won 1–0 against Cub in the first leg. In the second leg on 8 May, Trinidad and Tobago defeated Guyana 1–0 to advance 5–0 on aggregate. Four days later, Jamaica won 1–0 against Puerto Rico in the first leg. On May 15, Cuba and Guatemala drew 1–1 in the second leg as Guatemala advanced 2–1 on aggregate. A fortnight later, Jamaica won 2–1 in the second leg against Puerto Rico to advance 3–1 on aggregate. On 19 June, the Netherlands Antilles defeated Antigua and Barbuda 1–0 in the first leg. on 17 July, Costa Rica drew 1–1 with Panama in the first leg. On 29 July, the Netherlands Antilles defeated Antigua and Barbuda in the second leg 3–1 after extra time to advance 4–1 on aggregate. Two days later, Costa Rica defeated Panama 2–0 in the second leg to advance 3–1 on aggregate.

First round
Team 1	Agg.	Team 2	1st leg	2nd leg
Canada	Bye	n/a	—	—
Honduras	Bye	n/a	—	—
El Salvador	Bye	n/a	—	—
United States	Bye	n/a	—	—
Mexico	Bye	n/a	—	—
Guyana	0–5	Trinidad and Tobago	0–4	0–1
Cuba	1–2	Guatemala	0–1	1–1
Jamaica	3–1	Puerto Rico	1–0	2–1
Antigua and Barbuda	1–4	Netherlands Antilles	0–1	1–3 (a.e.t.)
Costa Rica	3–1	Panama	1–1	2–0

=== Results ===
17 April 1988

Guyana	0–4	Trinidad and Tobago
		Elliot-Allen 41'; Faustin 71'; Lake 77'; Skeene 85'

Georgetown Cricket Club Ground, Georgetown
Attendance: 1,500
Referee: Omar Monsón (Puerto Rico)
8 May 1988

Trinidad and Tobago	1–0	Guyana
Corneal 68'

Skinner Park, San Fernando
Attendance: 1,744
Referee: Success (Netherlands Antilles)

Trinidad and Tobago won 5–0 on aggregate.

30 April 1988

Cuba	0–1	Guatemala
		López 44'

Estadio Pedro Marrero, Havana
Attendance: 12,000
Referee: Rodolfo Martínez (Honduras)
15 May 1988

Guatemala	1–1	Cuba
Pérez 68' (pen.)		González 40'

Estadio Marquesa de la Ensenada, San Marcos
Attendance: 18,000
Referee: Salas (United States)

Guatemala won 2–1 on aggregate.

12 May 1988

Jamaica	1–0	Puerto Rico
Brooks 10' (pen.)

Independence Park, Kingston
Attendance: 36,000
Referee: Melendez Gonzalez (Guatemala)
29 May 1988

Puerto Rico	1–2	Jamaica
de la Campa 52'		Anglin 32', 78'

Estadio Sixto Escobar, San Juan
Attendance: 675
Referee: Pearson (Bahamas)

Jamaica won 3–1 on aggregate.

19 June 1988

Antigua and Barbuda	0–1	Netherlands Antilles
		Rovina 54'

Antigua Recreation Ground, St. John's
Attendance: 426
Referee: José Hernandez (Costa Rica)
29 July 1988

Netherlands Antilles	3–1 (a.e.t.)	Antigua and Barbuda
Rovina 104', 118'; Rosina 120'		Edwards 38'

Ergilio Hato Stadium, Willemstad
Attendance: 3,009
Referee: José Antonio Garza (Mexico)

The Netherlands Antilles won 4–1 on aggregate.

17 July 1988

Costa Rica	1–1	Panama
Jara 26'		Mendieta 17'

Estadio Alejandro Morera Soto, Alajuela
Attendance: 14,694
Referee: Rafael Rodríguez (El Salvador)
31 July 1988

Panama	0–2	Costa Rica
		Cayasso 1'; Medford 71'

Estadio Rommel Fernández, Panama City, Panama
Attendance: 26,657
Referee: Charles Branche (Trinidad and Tobago)

Costa Rica won 3–1 on aggregate.

== Second round ==
Mexico were disqualified for an infringement of age rules and Costa Rica were given a walkover to qualify for the final tournament.

The second round began on 24 July when Jamaica and the United States played out a goalless first leg. On 13 August, the United States won the second leg 5–1 against Jamaica to qualify for the final tournament 5–1 on aggregate. On 1 October, El Salvador defeated the Netherlands Antilles 1–0 in the first leg. Eight days later, Guatemala defeated Canada 1–0 in the first leg. On 15 October, Canada won 3–2 in the second leg against Guatemala to level the tie at 3–3 on aggregate. Guatemala qualified for the final tournament on the away goals rule. The following day, El Salvador won the second leg 5–0 against the Netherlands Antilles to qualify for the final tournament 6–0 on aggregate. The final tie began on 30 October when Trinidad and Tobago played out a goalless first leg with Honduras. A fortnight later, Honduras and Trinidad and Tobago drew the second leg 1–1. Trinidad and Tobago qualified for the final tournament on the away goals rule.

Second round
Team 1	Agg.	Team 2	1st leg	2nd leg
Jamaica	1–5	United States	0–0	1–5
Guatemala	(a) 3–3	Canada	1–0	2–3
Trinidad and Tobago	(a) 1–1	Honduras	0–0	1–1
Netherlands Antilles	0–6	El Salvador	0–1	0–5
Mexico	w/o (Note: Mexico were disqualified for an infringement of age rules.)	Costa Rica	—	—

=== Results ===
1 October 1988

Netherlands Antilles	0–1	El Salvador
		García 53'

Ergilio Hato Stadium, Willemstad
Attendance: 3,311
Referee: Charles Branche (Trinidad and Tobago)
16 October 1988

El Salvador	5–0	Netherlands Antilles
Coreas 5'; Garcia 35'; Francisca 62' (o.g.); L. Zapata 58', 68'

Estadio Cuscatlán, San Salvador
Attendance: 40,000
Referee: Steve Bucknor (Jamaica)

El Salvador won 6–0 on aggregate.

24 July 1988

Jamaica	0–0	United States

Independence Park, Kingston
Attendance: 15,000
Referee: López (Honduras)
13 August 1988

United States	5–1	Jamaica
Bliss 18'; H. Pérez 69' (pen.); Klopas 76', 85'; Krumpe 78'		Sterling 54'

West Community Stadium, Fenton
Attendance: 6,100
Referee: David Brummitt (Canada)

The United States won 5–1 on aggregate.

30 October 1988

Trinidad and Tobago	0–0	Honduras

Queen's Park Oval, Port of Spain
Referee: Arturo Brizio Carter (Mexico)
13 November 1988

Honduras	1–1	Trinidad and Tobago
Flores 20'		Charles 56'

Estadio Nacional Chelato Uclés, Tegucigalpa
Attendance: 40,000
Referee: Tony Evangelista (Canada)

1–1 on aggregate. Trinidad and Tobago won on the away goals rule.

9 October 1988

Guatemala	1–0	Canada
B. Pérez 20' (pen.)

Estadio Doroteo Guamuch Flores, Guatemala City
Attendance: 17,065
Referee: Bratsis (United States)
15 October 1988

Canada	3–2	Guatemala
Mitchell 63', 83' (pen.); Bridge 88'		Paniagua 7'; Castañeda 37'

Swangard Stadium, Burnaby
Attendance: 6,318
Referee: Berny Ulloa Morera (Costa Rica)

3–3 on aggregate. Guatemala won on the away goals rule.

Mexico	Cancelled	Costa Rica

Costa Rica	Cancelled	Mexico

== Goalscorers ==
There were 41 goals scored in 18 matches, for an average of 2.28 goals per match.

3 goals

- (Netherlands Antilles) Reymundo Rovina

2 goals

- (Canada) Dale Mitchell
- (El Salvador) Ricardo García
- (El Salvador) Luis Ramírez Zapata
- (Guatemala) Byron Pérez
- (Jamaica) Winston Anglin
- (United States) Frank Klopas

1 goal

- (Canada) Ian Bridge
- (Costa Rica) Juan Cayasso
- (Costa Rica) Claudio Jara
- (Costa Rica) Hernán Medford
- (El Salvador) Salvador Coreas Privado
- (Guatemala) Carlos Castañeda
- (Guatemala) Juan Manuel López
- (Guatemala) Adán Paniagua
- (Honduras) Juan Alberto Flores
- (Jamaica) Dave Brooks
- (Jamaica) Alton Sterling
- (Netherlands Antilles) Shurbi Rosina
- (Trinidad and Tobago) Hutson Charles
- (Trinidad and Tobago) Anton Corneal
- (Trinidad and Tobago) Paul Elliot-Allen
- (Trinidad and Tobago) Marvin Faustin
- (Trinidad and Tobago) Geoffrey Lake
- (Trinidad and Tobago) Dexter Skeene
- (United States) Brian Bliss
- (United States) Paul Krumpe
- (United States) Hugo Pérez
- (Panama) Víctor René Mendieta Ocampo
- (Antigua and Barbuda) Derrick Edwards
