= Alfredo Vásquez =

Alfredo Vásquez or Vázquez may refer to:

- Alfredo Vásquez Acevedo (1844–1923), Uruguayan academic and politician
- Alfredo Vázquez Carrizosa (1909–2001), Colombian politician and diplomat
- Alfredo Vásquez Cobo (1869–1941), Colombian politician, signed the Vásquez Cobo–Martins treaty
- Alfredo Vásquez Rivera (born 1965), Guatemalan diplomat, ambassador to the Holy See
- Alfredo Vázquez Vázquez (born 1981), Mexican politician, deputy for the 3rd federal electoral district of Chiapas
- Alfredo Vázquez (sailor) (born 1963), Spanish sports sailor

== Things named for them ==
- Alfredo Vásquez Cobo International Airport, in Leticia, Colombia
- Alfredo Vásquez Acevedo Institute, in Montevideo, Uruguay
- Vásquez Cobo–Martins treaty, between Colombia and Brazil
