= Brian Williams (footballer, born 1961) =

Trinidad and Tobago footballer and coach

Personal information
- Date of birth: 21 October 1961 (age 65)
- Place of birth: Siparia, Trinidad anad Tobago
- Position: Defender

Senior career*
Years	Team	Apps	(Gls)
1982–85	Aviation Service Limited		
1985–1990	Trintoc FC		
1990–1993	Trintopec Palo Seco		
1993	United Petrotin		

International career
1980–1990	Trinidad and Tobago	25	(0)

Managerial career
- 2016–: Trinidad and Tobago U20
- * Club domestic league appearances and goals

Brian Williams is a Trinidadian football coach and former football player.

== Career ==
As a player, Williams featured for Trinidad and Tobago in qualifying campaigns for the 1982 FIFA World Cup and 1990 FIFA World Cup. He participated in the 1987 Pan American Games football tournament and the qualification campaign for the 1988 Summer Olympics football tournament.

Williams made his international debut against Netherlands Antilles at the age of 19 in November 1980. His final appearance was against Russia in November 1990.

He was appointed as head coach of the Trinidad and Tobago national under-20 football team in April 2016.
