= Hassan Kamal =

Iraqi footballer

Personal information
- Date of birth: 1 July 1964 (age 62)

Senior career*
Years	Team	Apps	(Gls)
1981-1983	Al-Zawra'a SC		
1983-1990	Al-Jaish SC		
1990-1991	Al-Talaba SC		
1991-1992	AlSalam		
1992-1993	Al-Shorta SC		

International career
1984–1989	Iraq	24	(1)

Managerial career
- 2022–: Iraq U17
- * Club domestic league appearances and goals

Hassan Kamal (Arabic: حَسَن كَمَال; born 1 July 1964) is an Iraqi former footballer. He competed in the men's tournament at the 1988 Summer Olympics, and currently manages Iraq U17.
