= Ahmad Jassim =

Iraqi footballer

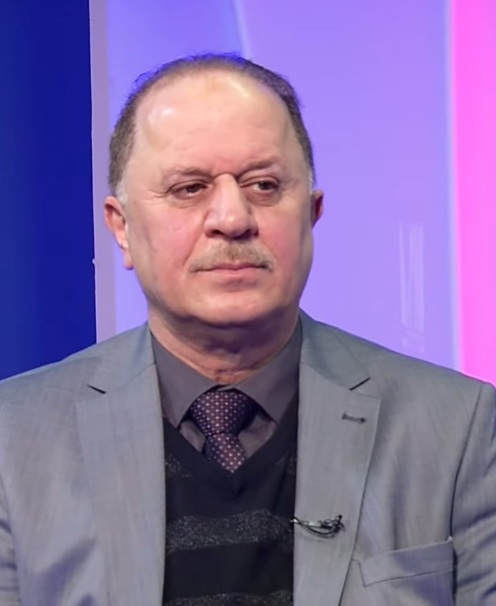

Personal information
- Full name: Ahmad Jassim Mohammed
- Date of birth: 4 May 1960 (age 66)
- Place of birth: Iraq
- Position: Goalkeeper

Senior career*
Years	Team	Apps	(Gls)
1980-1984	Al-Zawraa		
1984–1986	Al-Rasheed		
1986–1989	Al-Naft		
1989–1991	Al-Zawraa		
1991–1992	Al-Talaba		
1992–1995	Al-Najaf		

International career
1986–1990	Iraq	31	(0)

Managerial career
- 2021–: Iraq (Goalkeeping coach)
- * Club domestic league appearances and goals

Ahmad Jassim Mohammed (Arabic: أَحْمَد جَاسِم مُحَمَّد; born 4 May 1960) is an Iraqi former football goalkeeper who played for Iraq in the 1986 FIFA World Cup.

Ahmad Jassim started his career with Al-Zawraa, then played for Al-Rasheed, Al-Naft and Al-Talaba. He was called up by Brazilian coach Evaristo de Macedo into Iraq’s World Cup squad as an understudy to both Raad Hammoudi of Al-Shorta and Al-Jaish’s veteran keeper Fatah Nsaief.
