= Juan Manuel Dávila =

Guatemalan footballer

Personal information
- Date of birth: 7 May 1963 (age 63)

International career
Years	Team	Apps	(Gls)
- Guatemala

Juan Manuel Dávila (born 7 May 1963) is a Guatemalan former footballer. He competed in the men's tournament at the 1988 Summer Olympics.
