= Douglas Kalembo =

Zambian sprinter

Personal information
- Nationality: Zambian
- Born: 24 July 1960 (age 65)

Sport
- Sport: Sprinting
- Event: 400 metres

Douglas Kalembo (born 24 July 1960) is a Zambian sprinter. He competed in the men's 400 metres at the 1988 Summer Olympics.
