= Beston Chambeshi =

Zambian footballer and coach (born 1960)

Personal information
- Date of birth: 4 April 1960 (age 66)
- Height: 1.72 m (5 ft 8 in)
- Position: Forward

Senior career*
| Years | Team | Apps | (Gls) |
- Nkana

International career
| 1988 | Zambia Olympics | | |

Managerial career
- 2012–2013: Power Dynamos
- 2017: Nkana
- 2017–2021: Zambia U20
- 2018: Zambia (interim)
- 2021–2022: Zambia
- * Club domestic league appearances and goals

Beston Chambeshi (born 4 April 1960) is a Zambian football coach and former player.

== Playing career ==
Chambeshi played club football for Nkana.

He represented Zambia at the 1988 Summer Olympics.

== Coaching career ==
Chambeshi coached Zambian club side Power Dynamos from 2012 to 2013. He became manager of the Zambian under-20 team in 2017, and managed them at the 2017 FIFA U-20 World Cup. He combined his role with that of club side Nkana, and he won the 2017 FAZ Coach of the Year Award.

In May 2018, following the resignation of Wedson Nyirenda, he was appointed interim manager of the Zambian senior team. He was replaced by Belgian manager Sven Vandenbroeck in July 2018.

In July 2021, Chambeshi was appointed manager of Zambia, replacing Milutin Sredojević.
