= Emad Hashim =

Iraqi footballer

Personal information
- Full name: Emad Hashim Hassan
- Date of birth: 10 February 1969 (age 57)
- Place of birth: Baghdad, Iraq
- Height: 1.92 m (6 ft 4 in)
- Position: Goalkeeper

Team information
- Current team: Erbil SC (Goalkeeping coach)

Senior career*
| Years | Team | Apps | (Gls) |
| 1986–1987 | Al-Shabab SC | | |
| 1987–1997 | Al Shorta | | |
| 1997–1998 | Al Zawraa | | |
| 1998–1999 | Shabab Al Sahel FC | | |
| 1999–2000 | Al Shorta | | |
| 2000–2001 | Al-Wehda SCC (Sanaa) | | |
| 2001–2003 | Al Shorta | | |

International career
| 1989–2001 | Iraq | 75 | (0) |

Managerial career
- 2014–2015: Iraq (Goalkeeping coach)
- 2015–2016: Al-Zawraa (Goalkeeping coach)
- 2016–2017: Iraq (Goalkeeping coach)
- 2017: Al-Quwa Al-Jawiya (Goalkeeping coach)
- 2018–2020: Al-Talaba (Goalkeeping coach)
- 2020–2021: Al-Shorta (Goalkeeping coach)
- 2021–: Al-Zawraa (Goalkeeping coach)
- * Club domestic league appearances and goals

Emad Hashim Hassan (Arabic: عِمَاد هَاشِم حَسَن; born 10 February 1969) is an Iraqi football goalkeeper who played for Iraq in the 1996 AFC Asian Cup and 2000 AFC Asian Cup. He also played club football with Al Shorta for 14 years.

After turning in outstanding goalkeeping performances for the Iraqi youth team, Ammo Baba brought Emad Hashim into the international setup when he was just a teenager.

In the 1989 FIFA World Youth Championship in Saudi Arabia, Iraq topped a group beating Spain, Argentina and Norway to advance to the 2nd round, where they lost 2-1 to USA. Emad was in goal during the qualifying games for 1994 World Cup and also the 1996 Asian Cup campaign in the U.A.E, where he saved a penalty against the hosts in the quarterfinal before the Emirates scored a golden goal a few minutes into extra-time.

He found himself out of favour after the early exit in the World Cup qualification games for France'98, but was recalled by Milan Zivadinovic into Iraq’s 2000 Asian Cup squad.

In 2001, Croatian coach Rudolf Belin gave him a start for the World Cup qualifier against Iran in Baghdad, his last game for Iraq.

Sporting positions
| Preceded by Laith Hussein | Iraq captain 2003 - 2004 | Succeeded by Hussam Fawzi |
