= Manfred Chabinga =

Zambian footballer (born 1965)

Personal information
- Date of birth: 6 November 1965 (age 60)

International career
Years	Team	Apps	(Gls)
- Zambia

Manfred Chabinga (born 6 November 1965) is a Zambian footballer. He competed in the men's tournament at the 1988 Summer Olympics.
