= List of ambassadors of Guatemala to the Holy See =

Coordinates: 41.897333°N 12.450740°E

Ambassador of Guatemala to the Holy See
- Incumbent; Alfredo Vásquez Rivera since December 1, 2016
- Inaugural holder: Fernando Lorenzana
- Formation: June 23, 1851

The Guatemalan ambassador to the Hoy See in Rome is the official representative of the Government in Guatemala City to the subject of international law, Holy See.

== List of representatives ==
Diplomatic accreditation	Ambassador	Observations	President of Guatemala	List of popes	Term end
June 23, 1851	Fernando Lorenzana	Chargé d'affaires	José Rafael Carrera Turcios	Pope Pius IX	
1936	Francisco A. Figueroa		José María Reina Andrade	Pope Pius XII	1949
1956	Domingo Coicolea Villacorta		Carlos Castillo Armas	Pope Pius XII	1958
1958	Pedro De Yurrita Maury		Miguel Ydígoras Fuentes	Pope John XXIII	1963
1963	Luis Beltranena Sinibaldi		Alfredo Enrique Peralta Azurdia	Pope Paul VI	1964
1964	Eduardo de León Strecker	Chargé d'affaires	Alfredo Enrique Peralta Azurdia	Pope Paul VI	1965
1965	José Guirola Leal		Alfredo Enrique Peralta Azurdia	Pope Paul VI	1966
1966	Luis Valladares y Aycinena		Julio César Méndez Montenegro	Pope Paul VI	1983
1983	José Alejandro Deutschmann Miron		Óscar Humberto Mejía Víctores	Pope John Paul II	1986
1986	Julio Antonio Torres Arriola	Chargé d'affaires	Marco Vinicio Cerezo Arévalo	Pope John Paul II	1987
1987	Carlos Alfredo Escobar Armas		Marco Vinicio Cerezo Arévalo	Pope John Paul II	1991
1991	Carlos Urrutia-Aparicio		Jorge Antonio Serrano Elias	Pope John Paul II	1992
1992	Mario Alfonso de la Cerda Bustamente		Jorge Antonio Serrano Elias	Pope John Paul II	1995
1995	José Mauricio Rodríguez Wever		Ramiro de León Carpio	Pope John Paul II	1998
1998	Sergio Iván Búcaro Hurtarte		Álvaro Arzú Irigoyen	Pope John Paul II	2000
2000	Acisclo Valladares Molina		Alfonso Antonio Portillo Cabrera	Pope John Paul II	2004
2004	Juan Gavarrete Soberón		Óscar Berger Perdomo	Pope John Paul II	2008
2008	Acisclo Valladares Molina		Álvaro Colom Caballeros	Pope Benedict XVI	2009
2009	Martha Thelma Calderón Vandenberg	Chargé d'affaires	Álvaro Colom Caballeros	Pope Benedict XVI	2010
February 6, 2010	Alfonso Roberto Matta Fahsen		Álvaro Colom Caballeros	Pope Benedict XVI	2016
December 1, 2016	Alfredo Vásquez Rivera		Jimmy Morales	Pope Francis	
