= Rónald Marín =

Costa Rican footballer (born 1962)

Personal information
- Full name: Rónald Marín Duran
- Date of birth: 2 November 1962 (age 63)
- Place of birth: Costa Rica
- Position: Defender

Senior career*
Years	Team	Apps	(Gls)
1985–1990	Herediano		
1992–1994	Cartaginés		
1994–1995	Alajuelense		

International career
1990	Costa Rica	3	(0)
- * Club domestic league appearances and goals

Rónald Marín Duran (born 2 November 1962) is a retired Costa Rican football defender who was a non-playing squad member for Costa Rica in the 1990 FIFA World Cup.

== CLub career ==
He played for Herediano and for Cartaginés with whom he lost the 1992-93 league final to Herediano. In 1994, when at Alajuelense, he was suspended for 16 matches after pushing a referee.

== International career ==
Marín made his debut for Costa Rica in a February 1990 Marlboro Cup match against the Soviet Union and earned a total of 3 caps in successive games, scoring no goals.

== Retirement ==
Marín has been working for the Road Safety Council since 2011. He is married and has two children.
