= Mudhafar Jabbar =

Iraqi footballer (born 1965)

Mudhafar Jabbar Tawfik
Personal information
- Date of birth: 11 January 1965 (age 61)
- Place of birth: Iraq
- Position: Defender

Senior career*
Years	Team	Apps	(Gls)
- Al-Talaba SC
- Al-Rasheed SC
- Al-Talaba SC

International career
1986–1990	Iraq		

Managerial career
- 2017: Al-Talaba
- 2017–2018: Al-Hudood
- 2018: Al-Najaf FC
- 2018–2019: Al-Sinaat Al-Kahrabaiya
- 2019–2021: Al-Hudood
- 2021–2022: Al-Orouba SC
- * Club domestic league appearances and goals

Mudhafar Jabbar Tawfik (Arabic: مُظَفَّر جَبَّار تَوْفِيق; born 11 January 1965) is an Iraqi footballer. He competed in the men's tournament at the 1988 Summer Olympics. Mudhafar Jabbar is coaching Al-Hudood now.

== Career statistics ==
=== International goals ===
Scores and results list Iraq's goal tally first.

No	Date	Venue	Opponent	Score	Result	Competition
1.	19 September 1988	Daejeon Hanbat Stadium, Daejeon	Guatemala	2–0	3–0	1988 Summer Olympics

== Managerial statistics ==
As of match played 28 March 2022

Managerial record by team and tenure
Team	From	To	Record					Ref.
Team	From	To	P	W	D	L	Win %	Ref.
Al-Talaba SC	9 March 2017	11 May 2017	7	3	2	2	42.9	
Al-Hudood SC	27 August 2017	19 May 2018	26	8	8	10	30.8	
Al-Najaf FC	6 September 2018	4 November 2018	7	1	3	3	14.3	
Al-Sinaat Al-Kahrabaiya	30 November 2018	23 February 2019	9	0	5	4	0.0	
Al-Hudood SC	24 July 2019	6 March 2021	32	4	15	13	12.5	
Al-Orouba SC	16 September 2021	28 March 2022	17	9	4	4	52.9	
Total			98	25	37	36	25.5	—
