= Jonathan Chipalo =

Zambian sprinter

Jonathan Chipalo OLY
Personal information
- Nationality: Zambian
- Born: 22 March 1962 (age 64)

Sport
- Sport: Sprinting
- Event: 400 metres

Jonathan Chipalo OLY (born 22 March 1962) is a Zambian sprinter. He competed in the men's 400 metres and 4 × 400 metres relay at the 1988 Summer Olympics.

== Career ==
Chipalo was 6th in his 400 metres heat at the 1988 Olympics, running 48.97 seconds. He ran 3rd leg on the Zambian 4 × 400 metres relay team, placing 7th in their heat in 3:11.35 minutes. The following year, he set his 400 metres personal best of 48.0 seconds.

He retired early due to injury.

== Personal life ==
Chipalo studied at Leipzig University in Germany. He worked as an assistant coach at the Zambian National Federation and was the General Secretary of the Zambian Olympians Association.

In 2003, he was elected president of foreign athletics student-coaches at Johannes Gutenberg-Universität Mainz in Germany. He represented 12 countries. He coached the Zambian athletics team at the 2004 Summer Olympics.

He ran for Zambia Amateur Athletics Association president in 2014, but his candidacy as well as those of three other challengers were declared invalid. Chipalo was co-opted into the Zambian National Paralympics Committee, but was accused of undertaking responsibilities beyond his assignment. He was removed from that post in 2015. In 2017, he sued the Zambian Athletics general secretary for non-payment of travel allowances. He continued to challenge the Zambia Athletics executives in 2020.

He founded a mobile fitness company called Health and Fitness Sports Academy Zambia. He worked on a program at the 2024 Summer Olympics that would allow French and African athletes to start businesses. In 2024, he praised Muzala Samukonga while calling for more domestic athletics competitions.

In 2025, Chipalo again filed to run for the presidency of Zambian Athletics. He ran on an athlete-focused platform. He also claimed that the then-current president of 20 years, Elias Mpondela, was not legally qualified to hold the role because he did not belong to a club.
