= Baba Laouissi =

Moroccan football referee

- Full name: Baba Laouissi
- Born: 6 October 1943 (age 83); Morocco
Years		Role

International
Years	League	Role

Baba Laouissi (born 6 October 1943) is a former football referee from the African state of Morocco. He is known for having officiated at the 1988 Olympic football tournament in Seoul, South Korea, as well as 1986 World Cup qualifiers.
