= Norman Delva =

Guatemalan footballer

Personal information
- Date of birth: 15 July 1969 (age 57)

International career
Years	Team	Apps	(Gls)
- Guatemala

Norman Delva (born 15 July 1969) is a Guatemalan footballer. He competed in the men's tournament at the 1988 Summer Olympics.
