= David Gardiner (footballer) =

Guatemalan footballer

Personal information
- Full name: David Enrique Gardiner Walton
- Date of birth: 11 February 1957 (age 69)
- Height: 1.86 m (6 ft 1 in)

International career
Years	Team	Apps	(Gls)
- Guatemala
Medal record
Men's association football
Representing Guatemala
Pan American Games
Bronze medal – third place	1983 Caracas	Team

David Enrique Gardiner Walton (born 11 February 1957) is a Guatemalan footballer. He competed in the men's tournament at the 1988 Summer Olympics. Gardiner was a member of the Guatemalan team that won a bronze medal at the 1983 Pan American Games.
