= James Chitalu =

Zambian footballer (born 1961)

Personal information
- Date of birth: 15 December 1961 (age 64)
- Position: Defender

International career
Years	Team	Apps	(Gls)
- Zambia

James Chitalu (born 15 December 1961) is a Zambian former footballer. He competed in the men's tournament at the 1988 Summer Olympics.
