= Edmond Mumba =

Zambian footballer (born 1962)

Personal information
- Date of birth: 14 August 1962 (age 64)
- Position: Defender

International career
Years	Team	Apps	(Gls)
- Zambia

Edmond Mumba (born 14 August 1962) is a Zambian former footballer. He competed in the men's tournament at the 1988 Summer Olympics.
