= Tomás Velásquez =

Costa Rican footballer (born 1957)

Personal information
- Date of birth: 18 December 1957 (age 68)
- Place of birth: Liberia, Costa Rica

International career
Years	Team	Apps	(Gls)
- Costa Rica

Tomás Eduardo Velásquez (born 18 December 1957) is a Costa Rican footballer. He competed in the men's tournament at the 1980 Summer Olympics.
