= Jaime Batres =

Guatemalan footballer (1964–2019)

Personal information
- Date of birth: 28 June 1964
- Place of birth: August 2019 (aged 55)

International career
| Years | Team | Apps | (Gls) |
- Guatemala

Jaime Batres (28 June 1964 – August 2019) was a Guatemalan footballer. He competed in the men's tournament at the 1988 Summer Olympics.
