= Víctor Hugo Monzón =

Guatemalan footballer and coach

Personal information
- Full name: Víctor Hugo Monzón Pérez
- Date of birth: 12 November 1957 (age 68)
- Place of birth: Guatemala City, Guatemala
- Position: Defender

Team information
- Current team: Guatemala (manager)

Youth career
- Aurora F.C.

Senior career*
Years	Team	Apps	(Gls)
1977–1993	Aurora F.C.		
- CSD Municipal

International career
1979–1992	Guatemala	55	(1)

Managerial career
- 2007: Municipal
- 2013–2014: Guatemala
Medal record
Men's football
Representing Guatemala
Pan American Games
Bronze medal – third place	1983 Caracas	Team
- * Club domestic league appearances and goals

Víctor Hugo Monzón Pérez (born 12 November 1957) is a Guatemalan football coach and former defender who played most of his career for the club Aurora F.C. in the 1980s and 1990s and became a member and later captain of the Guatemala national team.

== Club career ==
Born in Guatemala City, Monzón started his career in the youth divisions of Aurora F.C., who promoted him to the Liga Mayor (top division) in 1977. He spent almost his entire professional career at that club, being part of the league-winning squads of the 1978, 1984, 1986, and 1992–93 seasons. He ended his club career with a stint at CSD Municipal.

== International career ==
Monzón was first called up to the Guatemalan national team in 1979, and represented it at the 1983 Pan American Games, where the team obtained the bronze medal. Later, he played during the World Cup qualification processes for the World Cups of 1986, 1990, and 1994. He was also part of the squad that participated at the 1988 Olympic Tournament. His last cap was against Honduras in 1992. He was succeeded by Juan Manuel Funes as the national team captain.

== Managerial career ==
After his retirement from playing in 1994, Monzón became a coach, being in charge of the Guatemala Under-17 team in his early coaching years. After having been an assistant coach for club Municipal, he was appointed their manager in April 2007. He succeeded Enzo Trossero at this position, which Monzón held until November 2007 when he was substituted by Jorge Benítez.
