= Gwangju Mudeung Stadium =

Sports venue in Gwangju, South Korea

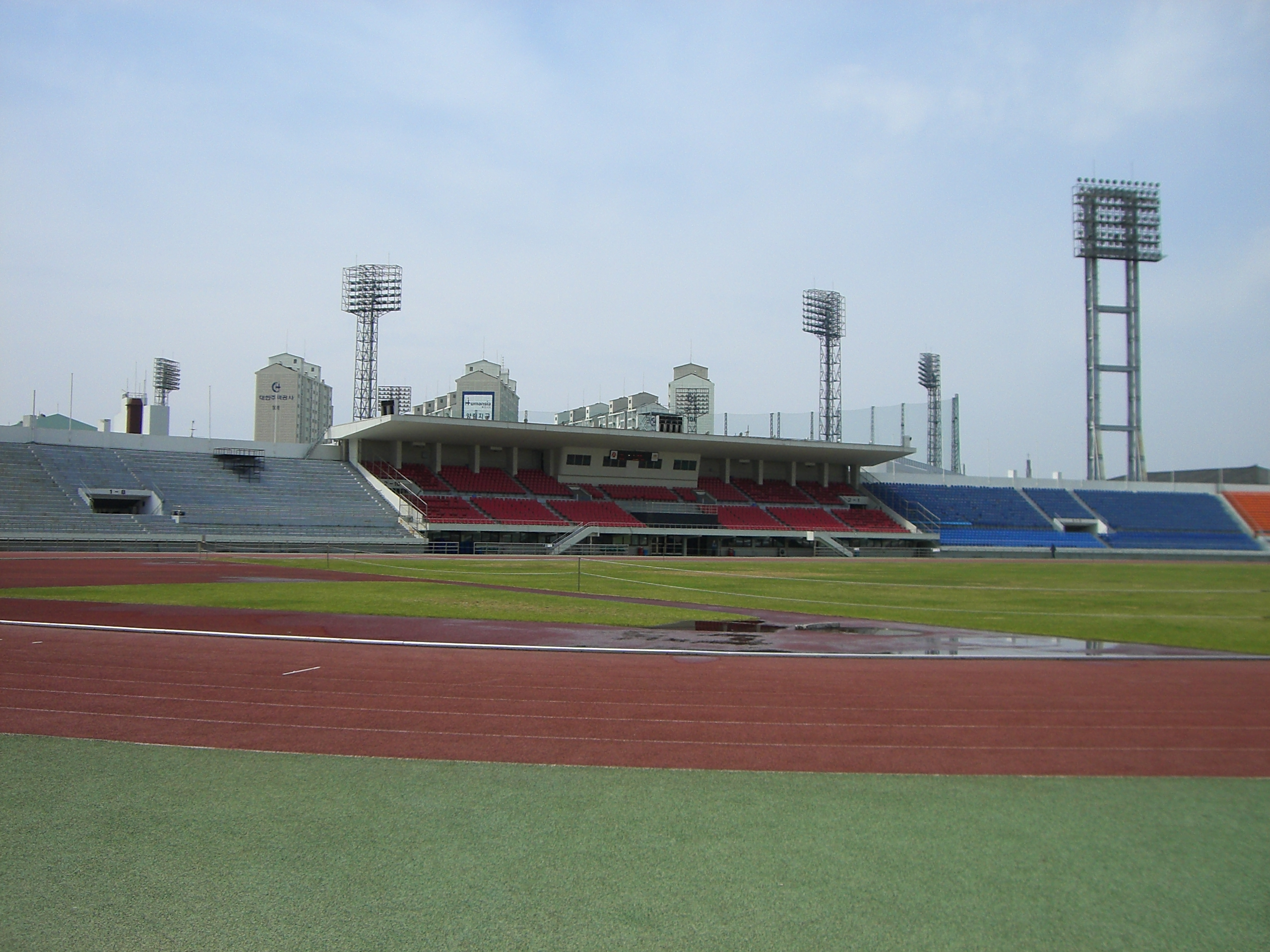
- Interactive map of Gwangju Mudeung Stadium
- Location: Gwangju, South Korea
- Coordinates: 35°9′10.39″N 126°50′24.89″E
- Operator: Gwangju
- Capacity: 24,304
- Surface: Grass, Tartan track

Construction
- Opened: 1 October 1965
- Closed: 2011

Gwangju Mudeung Stadium is a sports complex in Gwangju, South Korea. Main stadium is currently used mostly for football matches and has a capacity of 30,000 people and was opened in 1966. During the 1988 Summer Olympics, it hosted some football matches. This complex has Gwangju Mudeung Baseball Stadium and gymnasium.

It was removed and replaced as Gwangju-Kia Champions Field.
