= Carlos Castañeda (Guatemalan footballer) =

Guatemalan footballer (born 1963)

Personal information
- Full name: Carlos Castañeda Mendez
- Date of birth: 4 January 1963 (age 63)
- Position: Forward

Senior career*
Years	Team	Apps	(Gls)
- C.D. Suchitepéquez
- C.S.D. Comunicaciones

International career
1988-1994	Guatemala	17	(2)
- * Club domestic league appearances and goals

Carlos Castañeda Mendez (born 4 January 1963) is a former Guatemalan footballer who was a member of the Guatemala national team and represented Guatemala at the 1988 Olympic Games.

== Club career ==
A forward, Castañeda played for CD Suchitepequez and C.S.D. Comunicaciones in Guatemala.

== International career ==
At the 1988 Olympics, he scored a goal in a 5-2 loss to Italy in Guatemala's first match (a header off of a free kick) and started all of Guatemala's three matches.

In qualifying for the 1990 World Cup, Castaneda scored a crucial goal (escaping the marking of John Limniatis to score a header from a corner) versus Canada in the second leg of Guatemala's second round encounter giving Guatemala a 2-0 lead which eventually helped Guatemala advance to the final round of CONCACAF qualifying on away goals. He took part in 14 World Cup qualification matches in total during the 1990 and 1994 campaigns.

Castañeda also represented Guatemala at the 1991 and 1996 CONCACAF Gold Cups.
