= Alejandro Ortíz (footballer) =

Guatemalan footballer

Personal information
- Full name: Alejandro Ortíz Obregón
- Date of birth: 1 August 1958 (age 68)

International career
Years	Team	Apps	(Gls)
- Guatemala

Alejandro Ortíz Obregón (born 1 August 1958) is a Guatemalan footballer. He competed in the men's tournament at the 1988 Summer Olympics.
