= Rocael Mazariegos =

Guatemalan footballer (born 1966)

Personal information
- Date of birth: 8 January 1966 (age 60)
- Position: Defender

International career
Years	Team	Apps	(Gls)
- Guatemala

Rocael Mazariegos (born 8 January 1966) is a Guatemalan footballer. He competed in the men's tournament at the 1988 Summer Olympics.
