= Samuel Chomba =

Zambian footballer (1964-1993)

Personal information
- Date of birth: 5 January 1964
- Place of birth: Kitwe, Northern Rhodesia (now Zambia)
- Date of death: 27 April 1993 (aged 29)
- Place of death: Atlantic Ocean, off Gabon
- Height: 1.76 m (5 ft 9 in)
- Position: Defender

Senior career*
Years	Team	Apps	(Gls)
1984–1987	Nkana Red Devils		
1988–1982	Kabwe Warriors		
1993	Dynamos		

International career
1988–1993	Zambia	20	(2)
- * Club domestic league appearances and goals

Samuel Chomba (5 January 1964 – 27 April 1993) was a Zambian footballer who played as a defender. He was a member of the Zambia national team. He was among those killed in the crash of the team plane in Gabon in 1993.

== Career ==
Chomba played club football for Kabwe Warriors.

Chomba made several appearances for the Zambia national team and participated in the 1990 and 1992 African Cup of Nations finals. He also played for Zambia at the 1988 Summer Olympics in Seoul.

== Career statistics ==
=== International ===
As of match played 25 April 1993.

Appearances and goals by national team and year
National team	Year	Apps	Goals
Zambia	1988	3	0
Zambia	1989	0	0
Zambia	1990	1	0
Zambia	1991	4	1
Zambia	1992	8	1
Zambia	1993	5	0
Total		20	2

Scores and results list Zambia's goal tally first, score column indicates score after each Chomba goal.

List of international goals scored by Samuel Chomba
No.	Date	Venue	Cap	Opponent	Score	Result	Competition	Ref.
1.	27 November 1991	Mbale Municipal Stadium, Mbale, Uganda	8	Zanzibar	3–2	3–2	1991 CECAFA Cup	
2.	17 November 1992	CCM Kirumba Stadium, Mwanza, Tanzania	15	Ethiopia	3–2	3–2	1992 CECAFA Cup	
