= Eston Mulenga =

Zambian footballer (1967-1993)

Personal information
- Full name: Eston Mulenga
- Date of birth: 7 August 1967
- Place of birth: Zambia
- Date of death: 27 April 1993 (aged 25)
- Place of death: Atlantic Ocean, off Gabon
- Position: Defender

Senior career*
| Years | Team | Apps | (Gls) |
| 1981–1989 | Green Buffaloes | | |
| 1990–1993 | Nkana Red Devils | | |

International career
| 1988–1993 | Zambia | 36 | (1) |
- * Club domestic league appearances and goals

Eston Mulenga (7 August 1967 – 27 April 1993) was a Zambian footballer and member of the national team. He was among those killed in the crash of the team plane in Gabon in 1993.

== Career ==
Mulenga played club football for Nkana F.C. in Zambia.

Mulenga made several appearances for the Zambia national football team and participated in the 1990 and 1992 African Cup of Nations finals. He also played for Zambia at the 1988 Summer Olympics in Seoul.

== Career statistics ==
=== International ===
As of match played 25 April 1993.

Appearances and goals by national team and year
| National team | Year | Apps | Goals |
|---|---|---|---|
| Zambia | 1988 | 4 | 0 |
| Zambia | 1989 | 7 | 0 |
| Zambia | 1990 | 8 | 1 |
| Zambia | 1991 | 4 | 0 |
| Zambia | 1992 | 7 | 0 |
| Zambia | 1993 | 6 | 0 |
| Total | | 36 | 1 |

Scores and results list Zambia's goal tally first, score column indicates score after each Mulenga goal.

List of international goals scored by Eston Mulenga
| No. | Date | Venue | Cap | Opponent | Score | Result | Competition | Ref. |
|---|---|---|---|---|---|---|---|---|
| 1. | 25 August 1990 | Botswana National Stadium, Gaborone, Botswana | 18 | Zimbabwe | 3–1 | 3–1 | Friendly | |
