= Wisdom Mumba Chansa =

Zambian footballer (1964-1993)

Personal information
- Full name: Wisdom Mumba Chansa
- Date of birth: 17 April 1964
- Place of birth: Mufulira, Northern Rhodesia (now Zambia)
- Date of death: April 28, 1993 (aged 29)
- Place of death: Atlantic Ocean, off Gabon
- Height: 1.76 m (5 ft 9 1/2 in)
- Position: Midfielder

Youth career
- –1980: Rhokana United
- 1980–1983: Power Dynamos

Senior career*
Years	Team	Apps	(Gls)
1983–1985	Rhokana United		
1985–1989	Power Dynamos		
1989	Pomir Dushanbe	3	(0)
1990–1993	Power Dynamos		(9+)
1993	Dynamos		

International career
1983	Zambia U20		
1984–1993	Zambia	37	(4)
- * Club domestic league appearances and goals

Wisdom Mumba Chansa (17 April 1964 – 28 April 1993) was a Zambian football player who died in the 1993 air crash off the coast of Gabon that killed 18 players of the Zambia national team.

== Career ==
Chansa began his career with the youth team of Rhokana United, before moving to city rivals Power Dynamos in 1980 and quickly established himself in their side as an out-and-out striker before he adapted himself to a deeper lying role as second striker. Chansa became the first African, along with Pearson Mwanza and Derby Makinka, to play in the Soviet Top League when they all signed for Pomir Dushanbe in 1989 after being spotted during their 4–0 win over Italy at the 1988 Olympics.

Chansa's debut came on 2 October 1989 in an away match against Torpedo Moscow, before appearing twice more, against Rotor Volgograd and Metalist Kharkiv, before leaving at the conclusion of the 1989 season.

Chansa returned to Power Dynamos following his Soviet experience, and was made captain before Power Dynamos became the first Zambian club side to win a continental cup when they beat Nigeria's BCC Lions in the 1991 African Cup Winners' Cup final over two legs.

In 1993, Chansa had signed for Dynamos in South Africa before his death in the plane crash that killed 18 players of the Zambia national team off the coast of Libreville, Gabon on 27 April 1993.

== International career ==
Chansa made his international debut at junior level when he was instrumental in the Zambia's cup success in the regional U-20 COSAFA Cup in 1983. Chansa made his debut for Zambia in 1985, was called up to the squad for the 1988 Summer Olympics, and was a permanent feature in the Zambian side until his death.

== Career statistics ==
=== International ===
As of match played 25 April 1993.

Appearances and goals by national team and year
National team	Year	Apps	Goals
Zambia	1984	2	0
Zambia	1985	0	0
Zambia	1986	3	0
Zambia	1987	1	0
Zambia	1988	3	0
Zambia	1989	9	1
Zambia	1990	6	1
Zambia	1991	4	0
Zambia	1992	0	0
Zambia	1993	3	1
Total		37	4

Scores and results list Zambia's goal tally first, score column indicates score after each Chumba goal.

List of international goals scored by Wisdom Mumba Chumba
No.	Date	Venue	Cap	Opponent	Score	Result	Competition	Ref.
1.	17 January 1988	Independence Stadium, Lusaka, Zambia	7	Ghana	1–0	2–0	1988 Summer Olympic Games qualification	
2.	30 July 1990	Stade Omar Bongo, Libreville, Gabon	21	Gabon	1–0	1–2	1990 Africa Cup of Nations qualification	
3.	19 August 1990	Independence Stadium, Lusaka, Zambia	28	Eswatini	1–0	5–0	1992 Africa Cup of Nations qualification	
4.	30 January 1993	Independence Stadium, Lusaka, Zambia	35	Namibia	1–0	4–0	1994 FIFA World Cup qualification	
