= Richard Mwanza =

Zambian footballer (1959-1993)

Personal information
- Date of birth: 4 May 1959
- Place of birth: Zambia
- Date of death: 27 April 1993 (aged 33)
- Place of death: Atlantic Ocean, off Gabon
- Position: Goalkeeper

Senior career*
Years	Team	Apps	(Gls)
1980–1982	Vitafoam United Ndola		
1983–1993	Kabwe Warriors		

International career
1988–1993	Zambia	8	(0)
- * Club domestic league appearances and goals

Richard Mwanza (5 May 1959 − 27 April 1993) was a Zambian footballer and member of the national team. He was among those killed in the crash of the team plane in Gabon in 1993.

== Career ==
Mwanza played club football for Kabwe Warriors F.C.

Mwanza made several appearances for the Zambia national football team and participated in the 1992 African Cup of Nations finals. He also played for Zambia at the 1988 Summer Olympics in Seoul.

== Career statistics ==
=== International ===
As of match played 30 January 1993.

Appearances and goals by national team and year
National team	Year	Apps	Goals
Zambia	1988	3	0
Zambia	1989	0	0
Zambia	1990	1	0
Zambia	1991	1	0
Zambia	1992	1	0
Zambia	1993	2	0
Total		8	0
