= Ricardo Piccinini =

Guatemalan footballer

Ricardo Antonio Piccinini
Personal information
- Full name: Ricardo Antonio Piccinini Abonicio
- Date of birth: 7 September 1949 (age 77)
- Place of birth: Avellaneda, Argentina
- Position: Goalkeeper

Youth career
- 1967–69: Racing Avellaneda

Senior career*
Years	Team	Apps	(Gls)
1969–70	Racing Avellaneda		
1970–71	Municipal		
1972–74	Tipografía Nacional		
1975–80	Comunicaciones		
1980–82	Xelajú MC		
1982–83	Suchitepéquez		
1983	Nacional		
1984	Águila		
1984–91	Nacional		

International career
1976–1989	Guatemala	25	(0)
- * Club domestic league appearances and goals

Ricardo Antonio Piccinini (born 7 September 1949) is an Argentinian-born Guatemalan footballer. After his naturalization in 1975, he competed at the 1976 Summer Olympics and the 1988 Summer Olympics. His appearance in the latter at the age of 39 makes him the oldest footballer to ever play in the Olympics.

== Career ==
Club	Country	Year
Racing	Argentina	1969–1970
Municipal	Guatemala	1970–1971
Tipografía Nacional	Guatemala	1972–1974
Comunicaciones	Guatemala	1975–1980
Xelajú Mario Camposeco	Guatemala	1980–1982
Suchitepéquez	Guatemala	1982–1983
Municipal	Guatemala	1983
Águila	El Salvador	1984
Municipal	Guatemala	1984–1991

== Honours ==
=== Domestic honours ===
- Liga Nacional de Guatemala
  - Comunicaciones: 1977–78, 1979–80
  - Suchitepéquez: 1983
  - Municipal: 1987, 1988–89, 1989–90

=== Continental honours ===
- CONCACAF Champions' Cup
  - Comunicaciones: 1978
