= Stone Nyirenda =

Zambian footballer (born 1963)

Personal information
- Date of birth: 11 November 1963 (age 62)
- Position: Forward

International career
Years	Team	Apps	(Gls)
- Zambia

Stone Nyirenda (born 11 November 1963) is a Zambian former footballer. He competed in the men's tournament at the 1988 Summer Olympics.
