= Ricardo Jérez (footballer, born 1956) =

Guatemalan footballer

Edgar Jérez
Personal information
- Full name: Edgar Ricardo Jérez Hidalgo
- Date of birth: 6 August 1956 (age 70)
- Height: 1.79 m (5 ft 10 in)

International career
Years	Team	Apps	(Gls)
1980-1992	Guatemala	36	(0)
Medal record
Men's football
Representing Guatemala
Pan American Games
Bronze medal – third place	1983 Caracas	Team

Edgar Ricardo Jérez Hidalgo (Note: In this Spanish name, the first or paternal surname is Jérez and the second or maternal family name is Hidalgo.) (born 6 August 1956), known as Edgar Jérez or Ricardo Jérez, is a Guatemalan footballer. He competed in the men's tournament at the 1988 Summer Olympics. Jérez was a member of the Guatemalan team that won a bronze medal at the 1983 Pan American Games.

== Personal life ==
Jérez 's son, also named Ricardo Jérez, is also a professional footballer.
