= Mike Windischmann =

American soccer player (born 1965)

Personal information
- Full name: Michael Windischmann
- Date of birth: December 6, 1965 (age 60)
- Place of birth: Nuremberg, West Germany
- Height: 6 ft 0 in (1.83 m)
- Position: Defender

College career
Years	Team	Apps	(Gls)
1983–1986	Adelphi Panthers		

Senior career*
Years	Team	Apps	(Gls)
1986–1988	Brooklyn Italians		
1988–1989	Los Angeles Lazers (indoor)	21	(4)
1989–1990	Albany Capitals		

International career
- United States U16
1984–1990	United States	51	(0)
1986–1992	United States futsal	24	(4)
- * Club domestic league appearances and goals

Michael Windischmann (born December 6, 1965) is an American retired soccer defender who played in both the Major Indoor Soccer League and the American Soccer League. He earned fifty caps with the U.S. national team and was the captain of the U.S. team at the 1990 FIFA World Cup. He is a member of the National Soccer Hall of Fame.

== Youth ==
Windischmann was born in Nuremberg, West Germany, but his family moved to the United States when he was an infant. He attended Thomas Edison High School in New York City. He began playing soccer when he was six years old and developed as a player, not in the school system, but playing for local New York City clubs. These included Blau-Weiss Gottschee, S.C. Gjoa and Queens United. He played college soccer at Adelphi University. In 1986, Adelphi University inducted Windischmann into the school's Athletic Hall of Fame.

== Professional ==
After graduating from Adelphi University in 1986, Windischmann chose an alternate career from most of his peers. At the time, the Major Indoor Soccer League (MISL) was the destination of choice for collegiate soccer players. Windischmann decided instead to play for the Brooklyn Italians of New York City's Cosmopolitan League. He played two seasons with the Italians before joining the Los Angeles Lazers of MISL. His single season with the Lazers ran the 1988 to 1989 season when the team folded at the end of the season. Windischmann then moved to the Albany Capitals of the American Soccer League for another single season. At the end of the 1990 season, Windischmann retired from professional soccer.

== National team ==
Windischmann played for the U.S. at the U-16 World Cup.

Windischmann earned his first cap with the senior national team in 1984. He also played for the U.S. at the 1985 World University Games. Two years later, in 1987, he again played at the World University Games. That year, he was also on the U.S. team at the 1987 Pan American Games. The U.S. went 1-1-1 and did not make the second round.

The three years of 1988 to 1990 saw his international career reach its height. It began with the 1988 Summer Olympics where Windischmann was a member of the U.S. team. Windischmann considers one of his all-time career highlights, scoring a goal in a 1–1 tie with Argentina. Despite this excellent result, the U.S. finished the first round at 1-1-1 and did not qualify for the second round.

Windischmann saw more personal success the next year when he was chosen as the 1989 U.S. Soccer Athlete of the Year. He was also named as the captain for the 1990 FIFA World Cup qualification games. Windischmann's greatest achievement came when he captained the U.S. team at the 1990 FIFA World Cup. This was the first time the U.S. had made it to the World Cup since 1950. By the time Windischmann retired in 1990, he held the national-team record for the most consecutive games played (36) and started (33).

Windischmann also played for the U.S. at the 1989 and 1992 FIFA Futsal World Championship which finished third and second respectively. He earned 24 caps and scored 4 goals for the United States national futsal team between 1986 and 1992.

In 2004, he was elected to the National Soccer Hall of Fame.

== Coaching ==
He currently teaches and coaches at the Susan B. Anthony Academy, New York.
