= Kevin Sandoval (Guatemalan footballer) =

Guatemalan footballer

Personal information
- Full name: Kevin F. Sandoval Shannon
- Date of birth: 18 August 1962 (age 64)
- Place of birth: Guatemala City, Guatemala
- Height: 1.79 m (5 ft 10 1/2 in)
- Position: Striker

Senior career*
| Years | Team | Apps | (Gls) |
| 1981–1984 | Aurora F.C. | | |
| 1984–1985 | Comunicaciones | | |
| 1986–1989 | Aurora F.C. | | |
| 1991–1992 | CSD Municipal | | |
| Total | | 210 | (52) |

International career^{‡}
| 1981–1989 | Guatemala | 36 | (2) |
- * Club domestic league appearances and goals as of 22 March 2010 ‡ National team caps and goals as of 22 March 2010

Kevin Sandoval Shannon (born 18 August 1962 in Guatemala City) is a former Guatemalan footballer.

== International career ==
Sandoval member of the Guatemala national team who played at the 1988 Summer Olympics in Seoul, Korea., coming in as substitute in two matches, against Iraq and Zambia. He has also represented his country in two FIFA World Cup qualification matches.

== Retirement ==
After retiring from football, Sandoval attended and graduated from the University of Missouri in Columbia, Missouri. He then relocated to Chicago, Illinois.
