= Byron Pérez =

Guatemalan footballer and coach

Personal information
- Full name: Byron Romeo Pérez Solórzano
- Date of birth: 18 March 1959 (age 67)
- Height: 1.64 m (5 ft 5 in)
Medal record
Men's football
Representing Guatemala
Pan American Games
Bronze medal – third place	1983 Caracas	Team

Byron Romeo Pérez Solórzano (born 18 March 1959) is a Guatemalan football coach and former player who spent most of his career with local club Comunicaciones, and was also a member of the Guatemala national team for over a decade, playing in three World Cup qualifying campaigns and at the Olympic Games.

== Club career ==
Nicknamed "El Duende" ("the elf") due to his short height (he is 1.64 m tall), Pérez was a talented forward who played primarily on the left wing. He began his professional career with Comunicaciones in the late 1970s, and would go on to become one of the symbols of that club. He helped Comunicaciones win the 1978 CONCACAF title as he scored a goal against CD Once Municipal in the 3-1 victory in the first leg of the first round of the tournament. He also had stints with Municipal, Galcasa, Suchitepéquez, Once Lobos of El Salvador, Aurora F.C., and Deportivo Jalapa. In 1988 his services were required by the then Mexican top-flight club Leones Negros de la U. de G., where he played during the 1988-89 season. His team reached the final of the 1988-89 domestic cup tournament, where he scored a goal against Toluca in the second leg, although U. de G. lost 2-3 on aggregate.

== International career ==
In 1979, Pérez was a member of the U-23 national squad that won the II Unión Centroamericana youth tournament. As a member of the senior national team, he participated at the 1983 Pan American Games, winning the bronze medal, and later played during the 1986, 1990, and 1994 World Cup qualifying processes, scoring three goals in nine World Cup qualification matches. A tough moment came during 1986 World Cup qualification when against Canada with the score 2-1 in favor of the Canadians, he missed a penalty kick, which would have equalized the score and given his team a good chance of advancing to the next round. Instead, Canada advanced by finishing first of the group, two points ahead of Guatemala.

Pérez was also a member of the squad that competed at the 1988 Olympic Tournament in Seoul, Korea, where he played all three matches.

== Coaching career ==
Following his retirement, Pérez became a coach, managing several clubs, including Xinabajul, whom he led to win the 2007 Primera División de Ascenso Apertura championship which gave the team the right to fight for a promotion spot into the Liga Nacional the following year. He also managed Deportivo Heredia in the top flight (2008), Juventud Retalteca (2008), San Pedro (2010), and Sacachispas (2011).
