= Jesús Díaz (football referee) =

Colombian football referee (born 1954)

Jesús Díaz Palacio
- Full name: Jesús Díaz Palacio
- Born: 16 October 1954 (age 72); Colombia

Domestic
Years	League	Role

International
Years	League	Role
1986	FIFA listed	Referee

Jesús Díaz Palacio (born October 16, 1954) is a retired Colombian football referee. He is known for having refereed two matches in the 1986 FIFA World Cup in Mexico. One of the matches, Iraq versus Belgium, caused controversy as Díaz gave a yellow card to Iraq's Basil Gorgis in a case of mistaken identity (the yellow was supposed to be given to Ghanim Oraibi) while the score was 2–0 to Belgium. Gorgis sarcastically applauded Díaz's incorrect decision which led to Gorgis getting sent off and Iraq lost 2–1.
