= Adán Paniagua =

Guatemalan footballer (born 1955)

Adán Onelio Paniagua González (born 30 November 1955) is a former Guatemalan footballer who was a member of the Guatemala national team and represented Guatemala at the 1988 Olympic Games.

== Early life ==
He was born in Finca El Salto, Escuintla, Guatemala.

== Club career ==
Paniagua played forward for Club Caminos F.C. (1977-1978), Juventud Retalteca (1979, 1980-1981, 1984, 1988), CD Suchitepequez (1982-1983), Club Cobán Imperial (1987), Bandegua.Del Monte (1989), Deportivo Chiquimulilla (1990-1991), Club Izabal J.C (1991-1992), Deportivo Escuintla (1992-1993), CSD Sacachispas (1993) in Guatemala.

== International career ==
Paniagua played for Club Racing de Santander, España (1980) and Deportivo Águila de San Miguel, El Salvador (1985-1986).

He played on the Guatemala national team that was runner-up in the Unión Centroamerica Youth Tournament in El Salvador (1976). He participated in the Norceca Juvenil, Puerto Rico (1976), Pan American Games Puerto Rico (1979), Olympic Games Qualifying Moscow (1979), World Qualifying Spain (1982), World Cup Qualifying Mexico (1984), World Cup Qualifying Italy (1988).

At the 1988 Olympics (South Korea), he scored a goal in a 5-2 loss to Italy in Guatemala's first match and started Guatemala's first two matches (versus Italy and Iraq).

In qualifying for the 1990 World Cup, Paniagua scored a crucial goal which Guatemala a 1-0 lead versus Canada in the second leg of Guatemala's second round encounter. Guatemala advanced to the final round of CONCACAF qualifying on away goals over Canada. He took part in 9 World Cup qualification matches in total during the 1982 and 1990 campaigns.

== Managerial career ==
He served with Club Deportivo Jocotán, First division (1993-1995), Club Deportivo Sacachispas Major League (1994-1996, 1997-1998, 1999, 2002-2003), Deportivo Mictlán, First division (1996), Deportivo Escuintla, Major League (1997), Deportivo Ipala, Second Division (1999), Deportivo Marquense, First Division (2000, 2005) and Major League (2000-2001), Cobán Imperial, Major League (2003-2005, 2006), Deportivo Heredia (2006), Deportivo San Pedro First Division (2007, 2010), Deportivo Malacateco, First Division (2008), Deportivo Nueva Concepción, First Division (2009, 2011), Deportivo Sololá, Second Division (2012), Deportivo Halcones de la Mesilla, Major League (2013), Aurora, F.C., First Division (2013), Deportivo Panajachel, Second Division (2014, 2019), Deportivo San Sebastián, Second division (2015), Deportivo Atlas de Esquipulas (2016), Santa Ana, F.C. (2017), Deportivo Rabinal (2017, 2020,), Comitán F.C. (2018-2019).

== Honours ==
Deportivo Sacachispas Third Place; play CONCACAF (1994). National press recognition as Best First Division Technician (1999-2000). Promote from First Division to Major League at Deportivo Marquense (2000). Champion Opening Tournament First Division Deportivo San Pedro (2008). Promotion to Liga Mayor Deportivo Nueva Concepción (2014). Qualify for the round of 16 Panajachel Sports Final (2014). Qualify for the San Sebastián Sports Finals Quarter (2015). Classify second place Deportivo Rabinal (before Covid-19) (2020).
