= Derby Makinka =

Zambian footballer (1965-1993)

Personal information
- Full name: Derby Makinka
- Date of birth: 5 September 1965
- Place of birth: Salisbury, Southern Rhodesia (now Zimbabwe)
- Date of death: 27 April 1993 (aged 27)
- Place of death: Atlantic Ocean, off Gabon
- Height: 1.77 m (5 ft 9 1/2 in)
- Position: Midfielder

Senior career*
Years	Team	Apps	(Gls)
1984–1989	Profund Warriors		
1989	Pomir Dushanbe	3	(0)
1990	Darryn Textiles Africa United		
1991–1993	Lech Poznań	3	(0)
1993	Al-Ettifaq		

International career
1985–1993	Zambia	98	(10)
- * Club domestic league appearances and goals

Derby Makinka (5 September 1965 – 27 April 1993) was a Zambian footballer and member of the national team. He was among those killed in the crash of the team plane in Gabon in 1993.

== Career ==
Makinka played club football for Profound Warriors in Zambia, where he was voted Zambian Footballer of the year in 1989, before moving to Pomir Dushanbe in the Soviet Top League near the end of 1989 after being spotted during their 4–0 win over Italy at the 1988 Olympics. With this move he became the first African, along with Pearson Mwanza and Wisdom Mumba Chansa, to play in the Soviet Union. Makinka's debut came on 2 October 1989 in an away match against Torpedo Moscow, before appearing twice more, against Rotor Volgograd and Metalist Kharkiv, before leaving at the conclusion of the 1989 season. Makinka went on to play for Darryn Textiles in Zimbabwe, Lech Poznań in Poland and Ettifaq FC in Saudi Arabia.

== Personal life ==
Makinka had three children - one son and two daughters.

== Honours ==
Lech Poznań

- Ekstraklasa: 1991–92
