= Football at the 1988 Summer Olympics =

Tournament details
- Host country: South Korea
- Dates: 17 September – 1 October 1988
- Teams: 16 (from 6 confederations)
- Venues: 6 (in 5 host cities)

Final positions
- Champions: Soviet Union (2nd title)
- Runners-up: Brazil
- Third place: West Germany
- Fourth place: Italy

Tournament statistics
- Matches played: 32
- Goals scored: 95 (2.97 per match)
- Top scorer: (Brazil) Romário (7 goals)

An association football tournament was played as part of the 1988 Summer Olympics in South Korea, featuring 16 men's national teams from six continental confederations. The teams were drawn into four groups of four with each group playing a round-robin tournament. At the end of the group stage, the top two teams advanced to the knockout stage, beginning with the quarter-finals and culminating with the gold medal match at the Seoul Olympic Stadium on 1 October 1988.

Before the final match, the Soviet team relocated from the Olympic Village to a Soviet steamship stationed nearby. After winning the gold medal, each player from the Soviet team received 15 thousand dollars from the Soviet government.

== Venues ==
Seoul		Busan
Olympic Stadium	Dongdaemun Stadium	Busan Stadium
Capacity: 69,950	Capacity: 26,383	Capacity: 30,000
Daegu	Daejeon	Gwangju
Daegu Stadium	Daejeon Stadium	Gwangju Stadium
Capacity: 23,278	Capacity: 30,000	Capacity: 30,000
Football at the 1988 Summer Olympics is located in South Korea

== Qualification ==
The following 16 teams qualified for the 1988 Olympics football tournament:

Means of qualification	Berths	Qualified
Host nation	1	South Korea
AFC Preliminary Competition	2	China; Iraq
CAF Preliminary Competition	3	Nigeria; Tunisia; Zambia
CONCACAF Preliminary Competition	2	Guatemala; United States
1987 CONMEBOL Pre-Olympic Tournament	2	Brazil (winner); Argentina (runner-up)
OFC Preliminary Competition	1	Australia
UEFA Preliminary Competition	5	Italy; Sweden; Soviet Union; West Germany; Yugoslavia
Total	16	

== Participating nations ==
A total of 314 footballers from 16 participating nations were called up to the Games, with 268 having played in at least one match. Tunisia used the most players of any team throughout their run with 19 out of 20, while China only utilised 14 of their 18-man list.

- Argentina (16/19 players)
- Australia (16/20 players)
- Brazil (16/20 players)
- China (14/18 players)
- Guatemala (17/19 players)
- Iraq (16/20 players)
- Italy (18/20 players)
- South Korea (16/20 players)
- Nigeria (17/20 players)
- Sweden (17/20 players)
- Tunisia (19/20 players)
- United States (16/20 players)
- Soviet Union (18/20 players)
- West Germany (18/20 players)
- Yugoslavia (16/18 players)
- Zambia (18/20 players)

== Match officials ==
Africa

- (Gabon) Jean-Fidele Diramba
- (Morocco) Baba Laouissi
- (Senegal) Badara Sène

Asia

- (Syria) Jamal Al-Sharif
- (South Korea) Choi Gil-Soo
- (Bahrain) Mandi Jassim
- (Japan) Shizuo Takada

South America

- (Uruguay) Juan Daniel Cardellino
- (Brazil) Arnaldo Cézar Coelho
- (Colombia) Jesús Díaz
- (Argentina) Juan Carlos Loustau
- (Chile) Hernán Silva

North and Central America

- (Mexico) Edgardo Codesal
- (Trinidad and Tobago) Lennox Sirjuesingh
- (United States) Vincent Mauro

Europe

- (France) Gérard Biguet
- (United Kingdom) Keith Hackett
- (United Kingdom) Kenny Hope
- (Switzerland) Kurt Röthlisberger
- (Italy) Tullio Lanese
- (Poland) Michał Listkiewicz
- (West Germany) Karl-Heinz Tritschler
- (Soviet Union) Alexey Spirin

Oceania

- (Australia) Chris Bambridge

== Final tournament ==
=== Group stage ===
==== Group A ====
Pos	Team	Pld	W	D	L	GF	GA	GD	Pts
1	Sweden	3	2	1	0	6	3	+3	5
2	West Germany	3	2	0	1	8	3	+5	4
3	Tunisia	3	0	2	1	3	6	−3	2
4	China	3	0	1	2	0	5	−5	1

Source: FIFA
17 September 1988
17:00

China	0–3	West Germany
	[Report]	Wuttke 31'; Mill 60', 89'

Busan Gudeok Stadium, Busan
Attendance: 24,000
Referee: Juan Daniel Cardellino (URU)
17 September 1988
19:00

Sweden	2–2	Tunisia
Thern 44'; Hellström 45'	[Report]	Dhiab 16'; Maâloul 43' (pen.)

Daegu Civic Stadium, Daegu
Attendance: 20,000
Referee: Edgardo Codesal (MEX)

19 September 1988
17:00

Tunisia	1–4	West Germany
Maâloul 26' (pen.)	[Report]	Grahammer 4'; Fach 50'; Mill 55'; Wuttke 75' (pen.)

Busan Gudeok Stadium, Busan
Attendance: 14,000
Referee: Keith Hackett (GBR)
19 September 1988
19:00

China	0–2	Sweden
	[Report]	Lönn 19'; Hellström 42'

Daegu Civic Stadium, Daegu
Attendance: 17,000
Referee: Badara Séne (SEN)

21 September 1988
17:00

China	0–0	Tunisia
	[Report]

Busan Gudeok Stadium, Busan
Attendance: 17,000
Referee: Lennox Sirjuesingh (TRI)
21 September 1988
19:00

Sweden	2–1	West Germany
Engqvist 64'; Lönn 85'	[Report]	Walter 60'

Daegu Civic Stadium, Daegu
Attendance: 17,000
Referee: Kurt Röthlisberger (SUI)

==== Group B ====
Pos	Team	Pld	W	D	L	GF	GA	GD	Pts
1	Zambia	3	2	1	0	10	2	+8	5
2	Italy	3	2	0	1	7	6	+1	4
3	Iraq	3	1	1	1	5	4	+1	3
4	Guatemala	3	0	0	3	2	12	−10	0

Source: FIFA
17 September 1988

Italy	5–2	Guatemala
Carnevale 3'; Evani 11'; Virdis 34'; Ferrara 38'; Desideri 75'	[Report]	Castañeda 7'; Paniagua 79'

Gwangju Mudeung Stadium, Gwangju
17 September 1988

Zambia	2–2	Iraq
Nyirenda 44'; K. Bwalya 66'	[Report]	Radhi 36' (pen.); Allawi 71'

Daejeon Hanbat Stadium, Daejeon

19 September 1988

Zambia	4–0	Italy
K. Bwalya 40', 55', 90'; J. Bwalya 63'	[Report]

Gwangju Mudeung Stadium, Gwangju
19 September 1988

Iraq	3–0	Guatemala
Radhi 57'; Jabbar 67'; Mazariegos 77' (o.g.)	[Report]

Daejeon Hanbat Stadium, Daejeon

21 September 1988

Zambia	4–0	Guatemala
Makinka 53', 85'; K. Bwalya 79', 82'	[Report]

Gwangju Mudeung Stadium, Gwangju
21 September 1988

Iraq	0–2	Italy
	[Report]	Rizzitelli 59'; Mauro 63'

Dongdaemun Stadium, Seoul

==== Group C ====
Pos	Team	Pld	W	D	L	GF	GA	GD	Pts
1	Soviet Union	3	2	1	0	6	3	+3	5
2	Argentina	3	1	1	1	4	4	0	3
3	South Korea (H)	3	0	2	1	1	2	−1	2
4	United States	3	0	2	1	3	5	−2	2

Source: FIFA
(H) Hosts
18 September 1988

South Korea	0–0	Soviet Union
	Report

Busan Gudeok Stadium, Busan
18 September 1988

United States	1–1	Argentina
Windischmann 78'	Report	Alfaro 83' (pen.)

Daegu Civic Stadium, Daegu

20 September 1988

South Korea	0–0	United States
	Report

Busan Gudeok Stadium, Busan
20 September 1988

Argentina	1–2	Soviet Union
Alfaro 77' (pen.)	Report	Dobrovolski 7'; Mikhailichenko 22'

Daegu Civic Stadium, Daegu

22 September 1988

South Korea	1–2	Argentina
Noh Soo-jin 14'	Report	Alfaro 3'; Fabbri 73'

Busan Gudeok Stadium, Busan
22 September 1988

United States	2–4	Soviet Union
Goulet 65'; Doyle 85'	Report	Mikhailichenko 7', 48'; Narbekovas 19'; Dobrovolski 45' (pen.)

Daegu Civic Stadium, Daegu

==== Group D ====
Pos	Team	Pld	W	D	L	GF	GA	GD	Pts
1	Brazil	3	3	0	0	9	1	+8	6
2	Australia	3	2	0	1	2	3	−1	4
3	Yugoslavia	3	1	0	2	4	4	0	2
4	Nigeria	3	0	0	3	1	8	−7	0

Source: FIFA
18 September 1988

Australia	1–0	Yugoslavia
Farina 48'	Report

Gwangju Mudeung Stadium, Gwangju
18 September 1988

Brazil	4–0	Nigeria
Edmar 59'; Romário 74', 84'; Bebeto 86'	Report

Daejeon Hanbat Stadium, Daejeon

20 September 1988

Nigeria	1–3	Yugoslavia
Yekini 88'	Report	Stojković 35', 67'; Šabanadžović 49'

Daejeon Hanbat Stadium, Daejeon
20 September 1988

Australia	0–3	Brazil
	Report	Romário 20', 57', 61'

Dongdaemun Stadium, Seoul

22 September 1988

Brazil	2–1	Yugoslavia
André Cruz 25'; Bebeto 56'	Report	Šabanadžović 69'

Daejeon Hanbat Stadium, Daejeon
22 September 1988

Australia	1–0	Nigeria
Kosmina 76'	Report

Dongdaemun Stadium, Seoul

=== Knockout stage ===
Quarter-finals
25 September – Daegu
Sweden	1
Italy (a.e.t.)	2
25 September – Busan
Soviet Union	3
Australia	0
25 September – Gwangju
Zambia	0
West Germany	4
25 September – Seoul
Brazil	1
Argentina	0

Semi-finals
27 September – Busan
Italy	2
Soviet Union (a.e.t.)	3
27 September – Seoul
West Germany	1 (2)
Brazil (a.e.t.)	1 (3)

Gold medal match
1 October – Seoul
Soviet Union (a.e.t.)	2
Brazil	1
Bronze medal match
30 September – Seoul
Italy	0
West Germany	3

=== Quarter-finals ===
25 September 1988

Sweden	1–2 (a.e.t.)	Italy
Hellström 84'	Report	Virdis 50'; Crippa 98'

Daegu Civic Stadium, Daegu
Attendance: 11,000
Referee: Gérard Biguet (FRA)
25 September 1988

Soviet Union	3–0	Australia
Dobrovolski 50', 54' (pen.); Mikhailichenko 62'	Report

Busan Gudeok Stadium, Busan
Attendance: 7,000
Referee: Juan Daniel Cardellino (URU)
25 September 1988

West Germany	4–0	Zambia
Funkel 18'; Klinsmann 34', 42', 89'	Report

Gwangju Mudeung Stadium, Gwangju
Attendance: 8,000
Referee: Jesús Díaz (COL)
25 September 1988

Brazil	1–0	Argentina
Geovani 76'	Report

Dongdaemun Stadium, Seoul
Attendance: 21,800
Referee: Kurt Röthlisberger (SUI)

=== Semi-finals ===
27 September 1988

Soviet Union	3–2 (a.e.t.)	Italy
Dobrovolski 78'; Narbekovas 92'; Mikhailichenko 106'	Report	Virdis 50'; Carnevale 118'

Busan Gudeok Stadium, Busan
Attendance: 10,000
Referee: Jamal Al-Sharif (SYR)
27 September 1988

Brazil	1–1 (a.e.t.)	West Germany
Romário 79'	Report	Fach 50'
Penalties
João Paulo (penalty scored); Luiz Carlos (penalty scored); Romário (penalty scored); André Cruz (penalty missed)	3–2	(penalty missed) Janßen; (penalty missed) Klinsmann; (penalty scored) Kleppinger; (penalty scored) Fach; (penalty missed) Wuttke

Olympic Stadium, Seoul
Attendance: 65,000
Referee: Keith Hackett (GBR)

=== Bronze medal match ===
30 September 1988

Italy	0–3	West Germany
	Report	Klinsmann 5'; Kleppinger 18'; Schreier 68'

Olympic Stadium, Seoul
Attendance: 61,000
Referee: Juan Carlos Loustau (ARG)

=== Gold medal match ===
1 October 1988

Soviet Union	2–1 (a.e.t.)	Brazil
Dobrovolski 61' (pen.); Savichev 103'	Report	Romário 30'

Olympic Stadium, Seoul
Attendance: 74,000
Referee: Gérard Biguet (FRA)

Team details

Soviet Union

GK	1	Dmitri Kharine
RB	17	Viktor Losev (c)
CB	18	Sergei Gorlukovich	(yellow card) 91'
CB	12	Yevgeny Yarovenko
LB	2	Gela Ketashvili	(yellow card) 42'
CM	15	Oleksiy Mykhaylychenko
CM	7	Yevgeni Kuznetsov
RW	14	Volodymyr Tatarchuk	(yellow card) 78' (yellow-red card) 110'
AM	20	Arminas Narbekovas		(substituted off) 46'
LW	10	Igor Dobrovolski
CF	11	Volodymyr Lyutyi		(substituted off) 115'
Substitutions:
FW	19	Yury Savichev		(substituted on) 46'
DF	3	Igor Sklyarov		(substituted on) 115'
Manager:
Anatoliy Byshovets

Brazil

GK	1	Cláudio Taffarel
RB	14	Luiz Carlos Winck	(yellow card) 72'
CB	15	Aloísio	(yellow card) 115'
CB	13	André Cruz (c)
LB	2	Jorginho
DM	16	Milton
DM	19	Andrade
AM	10	Careca II	(yellow card) 42'
AM	17	Neto		(substituted off) 72'
CF	11	Romário
CF	20	Bebeto		(substituted off) 75'
Substitutions:
FW	9	Edmar	(red card) 118'	(substituted on) 72'
FW	18	João Paulo		(substituted on) 75'
Manager:
Carlos Alberto Silva

== Medal summary ==
Gold	Silver	Bronze
Soviet Union; Aleksandr Borodyuk; Oleksiy Cherednyk; Igor Dobrovolski; Sergei Fokin; Sergei Gorlukovich; Arvydas Janonis; Gela Ketashvili; Dmitri Kharine; Yevgeni Kuznetsov; Viktor Losev; Volodymyr Lyutyi; Oleksiy Mykhaylychenko; Arminas Narbekovas; Igor Ponomaryov; Yury Savichev; Igor Sklyarov; Vladimir Tatarchuk; Yevgeny Yarovenko Alexei Prudnikov; Vadym Tyshchenko	Brazil; Ademir; Aloísio; Andrade; Batista; Bebeto; Careca; André Cruz; Edmar; Geovani; João Paulo; Jorginho; Milton; Neto; Romário; Cláudio Taffarel; Luiz Carlos Winck Ricardo Gomes; Mazinho; Valdo Filho; Zé Carlos	West Germany; Rudi Bommer; Holger Fach; Wolfgang Funkel; Armin Görtz; Roland Grahammer; Thomas Häßler; Thomas Hörster; Olaf Janßen; Uwe Kamps; Gerhard Kleppinger; Jürgen Klinsmann; Frank Mill; Karl-Heinz Riedle; Christian Schreier; Michael Schulz; Ralf Sievers; Fritz Walter; Wolfram Wuttke Oliver Reck; Gunnar Sauer

== Final rankings ==
Pos	Team	Pld	W	D	L	GF	GA	GD	Pts
1	Soviet Union	6	5	1	0	14	6	+8	11
2	Brazil	6	4	1	1	12	4	+8	9
3	West Germany	6	4	1	1	16	4	+12	9
4	Italy	6	3	0	3	11	13	−2	6
5	Zambia	4	2	1	1	10	6	+4	5
6	Sweden	4	2	1	1	7	5	+2	5
7	Australia	4	2	0	2	2	6	−4	4
8	Argentina	4	1	1	2	4	5	−1	3
9	Iraq	3	1	1	1	5	4	+1	3
10	Yugoslavia	3	1	0	2	4	4	0	2
11	South Korea (H)	3	0	2	1	1	2	−1	2
12	United States	3	0	2	1	3	5	−2	2
13	Tunisia	3	0	2	1	3	6	−3	2
14	China	3	0	1	2	0	5	−5	1
15	Nigeria	3	0	0	3	1	8	−7	0
16	Guatemala	3	0	0	3	2	12	−10	0

(H) Hosts

Note: The players above the line played at least one game in this tournament, the players below the line were only squad members. Nevertheless, the International Olympic Committee medal database credits them all as medalists.

== Goalscorers ==
With seven goals, Romário of Brazil was the top scorer. In total, 95 goals were scored by 53 different players, with one of them credited as an own goal.

7 goals

- (Brazil) Romário

6 goals

- (Soviet Union) Igor Dobrovolski
- (Zambia) Kalusha Bwalya

5 goals

- (Soviet Union) Oleksiy Mykhaylychenko

4 goals

- (West Germany) Jürgen Klinsmann

3 goals

- (Argentina) Carlos Alfaro
- (Italy) Pietro Paolo Virdis
- (Sweden) Jan Hellström
- (West Germany) Frank Mill

2 goals

- (Brazil) Bebeto
- (Iraq) Ahmed Radhi
- (Italy) Andrea Carnevale
- (Soviet Union) Arminas Narbekovas
- (Sweden) Peter Lönn
- (Tunisia) Nabil Maâloul
- (West Germany) Holger Fach
- (West Germany) Wolfram Wuttke
- (Socialist Federal Republic of Yugoslavia) Dragan Stojković
- (Socialist Federal Republic of Yugoslavia) Refik Šabanadžović
- (Zambia) Derby Makinka

1 goal

- (Argentina) Néstor Fabbri
- (Australia) Frank Farina
- (Australia) John Kosmina
- (Brazil) André Cruz
- (Brazil) Edmar
- (Brazil) Geovani
- (Guatemala) Adán Paniagua
- (Guatemala) Carlos Castañeda
- (Iraq) Karim Allawi
- (Iraq) Mudhafar Jabbar
- (Italy) Alberigo Evani
- (Italy) Ciro Ferrara
- (Italy) Massimo Crippa
- (Italy) Massimo Mauro
- (Italy) Ruggiero Rizzitelli
- (Italy) Stefano Desideri
- (Nigeria) Rashidi Yekini
- (Soviet Union) Yury Savichev
- (South Korea) Noh Soo-jin
- (Sweden) Jonas Thern
- (Sweden) Leif Engqvist
- (Tunisia) Tarak Dhiab
- (United States) Brent Goulet
- (United States) John Doyle
- (United States) Mike Windischmann
- (West Germany) Christian Schreier
- (West Germany) Fritz Walter
- (West Germany) Gerhard Kleppinger
- (West Germany) Roland Grahammer
- (West Germany) Wolfgang Funkel
- (Zambia) Jonson Bwalya
- (Zambia) Stone Nyirenda

Own goal

- (Guatemala) Rocael Mazariegos (playing against Iraq)
