= Canada men's national soccer team results (1980–1999) =

- Win Draw Loss

This is a list of the Canada men's national soccer team results from 1980 to 1999.

== Results (1980s) ==
Key
Win
Draw
Defeat

=== 1980 ===
September 15, 1980 International Friendly	Canada	4–0	New Zealand	Vancouver, British Columbia
	Lenarduzzi 2'; Mitchell 57', 70'; Stojanovic 89'	Report		Attendance: 6,867

September 17, 1980 International Friendly	Canada	3–0	New Zealand	Edmonton, Alberta
	Lenarduzzi 36'; Miller (?), 57'	Report		Stadium: Commonwealth Stadium; Attendance: 1,751; Referee: Sadaam Yousufzai

October 18, 1980 1981 CONCACAF Championship qualification North American Zone	Canada	1–1	Mexico	Toronto, Ontario
15:00 UTC−4	Stojanović 43'	Report	Luna 89'	Stadium: Exhibition Stadium; Attendance: 6,371; Referee: Richie Laryea

October 25, 1980 1981 CONCACAF Championship qualification North American Zone	Canada	0–0	United States	Fort Lauderdale, U.S.
19:00 UTC−4		Report		Stadium: Lockhart Stadium; Attendance: 7,864; Referee: Michel Djaozandry

November 1, 1980 1981 CONCACAF Championship qualification North American Zone	Canada	2–1	United States	Vancouver, British Columbia
13:00 UTC−4	Iarusci 21'; Šegota 42' (pen.)	Report	Villa 87'	Stadium: Empire Stadium; Attendance: 13,598; Referee: John Clubb

November 9, 1980 International Friendly	Honduras	2–0	Canada	Tegucigalpa, Honduras
16:00 UTC−4	(?); 32'	Report		Stadium: Estadio Tiburcio Carías Andino

November 11, 1980 International Friendly	Guatemala	0–1	Canada	Guatemala City, Guatemala
19:00 UTC−4		Report	Mitchell 25'	Stadium: Estadio Mateo Flores

November 16, 1980 1981 CONCACAF Championship qualification North American Zone	Mexico	1–1	Canada	Mexico City, Mexico
12:00 UTC−4	Sánchez 30' (pen.)	Report	McLeod (red card) 77'; Gray 87'	Stadium: Estadio Azteca; Attendance: 90,000; Referee: Gurman Sangha

=== 1981 ===
October 12, 1981 International Friendly	Trinidad and Tobago	2–4	Canada	San Fernando, Trinidad and Tobago
20:00 UTC−4	(?); (?)	Report	Mitchell (?); Segota (?); Stojanovic (?)	Stadium: Skinner Park

October 14, 1981 International Friendly	Guadeloupe	1–2	Canada	Pointe-à-Pitre, Guadeloupe
	76'	Report	Lenarduzzi 34'; Segota 84'	Stadium: Stade Pierre-Antonius

November 2, 1981 1981 CONCACAF Championship; Final round	Canada	1–0	El Salvador	Tegucigalpa, Honduras
	Stojanovic 89'	Report		Stadium: Estadio Tiburcio Carías Andino; Attendance: 31,570; Referee: Noah Pio

November 6, 1981 1981 CONCACAF Championship; Final round	Haiti	1–1	Canada	Tegucigalpa, Honduras
	Romulas 34'	Report	Stojanovic 50'	Stadium: Estadio Tiburcio Carías Andino; Attendance: 33,237; Referee: Kwame Amoah

November 12, 1981 1981 CONCACAF Championship; Final round	Honduras	2–1	Canada	Tegucigalpa, Honduras
	Caballero 12'; Figueroa 40'	Report	Bridge 19'	Stadium: Estadio Tiburcio Carías Andino; Attendance: 39,071; Referee: John Clubb

November 15, 1981 1981 CONCACAF Championship; Final round	Mexico	1–1	Canada	Tegucigalpa, Honduras
	Castro 29'	Report	Bridge 57'	Stadium: Estadio Tiburcio Carías Andino; Attendance: 40,167; Referee: Luca Ricci

November 21, 1981 1981 CONCACAF Championship; Final round	Cuba	2–2	Canada	Tegucigalpa, Honduras
	Núñez 11'; Rodríguez 79'	Report	McLeod 48'; Iarusci 84'	Stadium: Estadio Tiburcio Carías Andino; Attendance: 16,458

=== 1983 ===
June 12, 1983 International Friendly	Canada	0–2	Scotland	Vancouver, British Columbia
14:00 UTC−4		Report	Strachan 35' (pen.); McGhee 76'	Stadium: Empire Stadium; Attendance: 14,942

June 16, 1983 International Friendly	Canada	0–3	Scotland	Edmonton, Alberta
19:40 UTC−4		Report	20'; 50'; 88'	Stadium: Commonwealth Stadium; Attendance: 10,240; Referee: Sebastian Sgarbossa

June 19, 1983 International Friendly	Canada	0–2	Scotland	Toronto, Ontario
15:00 UTC−4		Report	17'; 35'	Stadium: Varsity Stadium; Attendance: 15,500; Referee: Yazid Aboubakr

December 6, 1983 International Friendly	Mexico	5–0	Canada	Irapuato, Mexico
	(?); (?); (?); (?); (?)	Report		Stadium: Estadio Revolucion; Attendance: 13,000

December 11, 1983 International Friendly	Honduras	3–1	Canada	San Pedro Sula, Honduras
	(?); (?); (?)	Report	Pakos (?)	Stadium: Estadio Francisco Morazan

December 14, 1983 International Friendly	Honduras	1–0	Canada	Tegucigalpa, Honduras
	(?)	Report		Stadium: Estadio Tiburcio Carías Andino; Attendance: 20,000

=== 1984 ===
March 28, 1984 International Friendly	Haiti	0–1	Canada	Port-au-Prince, Haiti
20:00 UTC−4		Report	Bridge (?)	Stadium: Stade Sylvio Cator; Attendance: 19,000

May 26, 1984 International Friendly	Canada	0–2	Italy	Toronto, Ontario
		Report	Altobelli 31'; Battistini 85'	Stadium: Varsity Stadium; Attendance: 18,000; Referee: Nicolas Benavidez

July 25, 1984 International Friendly	Canada	0–0	Chile	Edmonton, Alberta
20:00 UTC−4		Report		Stadium: Clarke Stadium; Attendance: 6,137; Referee: David-Joe Marsillo

October 16, 1984 International Friendly	Algeria	1–0	Canada	Algiers, Algeria
19:30 UTC−4	(?)	Report		Stadium: Olympic Stadium; Attendance: 3,000; Referee: Alexis Vaughan

October 21, 1984 International Friendly	Tunisia	2–0	Canada	Tunis, Tunisia
19:30 UTC−4	(?); (?)	Report		Stadium: Abdellaziz Chtioui Stadium; Attendance: 18,000; Referee: Antonio Floro

October 24, 1984 International Friendly	Morocco	3–2	Canada	Rabat, Morocco
20:00 UTC−4	El Haddaoui (?); (?)	Report	James 59'; Miller 89'	Stadium: Prince Moulay Abdellah Stadium; Attendance: 15,000; Referee: Ashley Comish

October 30, 1984 International Friendly	Cyprus	0–0	Canada	Nicosia, Cyprus
17:30 UTC−4		Report		Stadium: Nicosia Stadium; Attendance: 6,000; Referee: Nadjib Chemil

November 2, 1984 International Friendly	Egypt	1–0	Canada	Egypt
15:00 UTC−4	(?)	Report		Attendance: 3,000; Referee: Alexis Vaughan

=== 1985 ===
March 10, 1985 International Friendly	Trinidad and Tobago	1–2	Canada	Port of Spain, Trinidad and Tobago
19:30 UTC−4	(?)	Report	Vrablic (?); De Luca (?)	Referee: Nicolas Budisa

March 13, 1985 International Friendly	Jamaica	1–1	Canada	Montego Bay, Jamaica
18:00 UTC−4	(?)	Report	Vrablic (?)	Stadium: Jarrett Park; Attendance: 8,000; Referee: Alex Cormier

March 17, 1985 International Friendly	Jamaica	0–0	Canada	Kingston, Jamaica
		Report		Stadium: Independence Park; Referee: Emovon Esosa

March 21, 1985 International Friendly	Costa Rica	1–0	Canada	San José, Costa Rica
20:00 UTC−4	(?)	Report		Stadium: Estadio Nacional; Attendance: 17,000

March 24, 1985 International Friendly	Costa Rica	0–0	Canada	San José, Costa Rica
12:00 UTC−4		Report		Stadium: Estadio Nacional; Attendance: 15,000; Referee: Nikola Paunic

April 2, 1985 International Friendly	Canada	2–0	United States	Vancouver, British Columbia
	Vrablic 68', 80'	Report		Stadium: BC Place Stadium; Attendance: 9,150

April 4, 1985 International Friendly	United States	1–1	Canada	Portland, U.S.
	Pérez (?)	Report	Pakos (?)	Stadium: Civic Stadium; Attendance: 4,181; Referee: Léo Fuguliun-Langevin

April 13, 1985 1985 CONCACAF Championship; First round Group 2	Canada	2–0	Haiti	Victoria, British Columbia
10:30 UTC−4	Vrablic 29'; Sweeney 41'	Report		Stadium: Royal Athletic Park; Attendance: 2,886

April 20, 1985 1985 CONCACAF Championship; First round Group 2	Canada	2–1	Guatemala	Victoria, British Columbia
12:00 UTC−4	Mitchell 22', 43'	Report	Gómez 66'	Stadium: Royal Athletic Park; Attendance: 5,202

May 5, 1985 1985 CONCACAF Championship; First round Group 2	Guatemala	1–1	Canada	Guatemala City, Guatemala
	B. Pérez 42'	Report	Mitchell 38'	Stadium: Estadio Mateo Flores; Attendance: 30,000; Referee: David Greyeyes

May 8, 1985 1985 CONCACAF Championship; First round Group 2	Haiti	0–2	Canada	Port-au-Prince, Haiti
18:00 UTC−4		Report	Mitchell 14'; Vrablic 56'	Stadium: Stade Sylvio Cator; Attendance: 7,000; Referee: Ryan Amorim

June 2, 1985 Presidents Cup	Canada	2–1	Ghana	Seoul, South Korea
	Mitchell (?); Norman (?)	Report	Pele (?)	Attendance: 5,000; Referee: Alexis Vaughan

June 9, 1985 Presidents Cup	Iraq	6–1	Canada	Gwangju, South Korea
	(?); (?); (?); (?); (?); (?)	Report	Catliff (?)	Attendance: 15,000; Referee: Alexis Vaughan

August 17, 1985 1985 CONCACAF Championship; Final round	Canada	1–1	Costa Rica	Toronto, Ontario
	James 59'	Report	Williams 12'	Stadium: Varsity Stadium; Attendance: 13,486; Referee: Shawn Rojas

August 25, 1985 1985 CONCACAF Championship; Final round	Honduras	0–1	Canada	Tegucigalpa, Honduras
		Report	Pakos 60'	Stadium: Estadio Tiburcio Carías Andino; Attendance: 37,000; Referee: Nikola Stakic

September 1, 1985 1985 CONCACAF Championship; Final round	Costa Rica	0–0	Canada	San José, Costa Rica
		Report		Stadium: Estadio Nacional; Attendance: 23,398

September 14, 1985 1985 CONCACAF Championship; Final round	Canada	2–1	Honduras	St. John's, Newfoundland and Labrador
15:30 UTC−4	Pakos 16'; Vrablic 61'	Report	Betancourt 49'	Stadium: King George V Park; Attendance: 13,000

=== 1986 ===
January 29, 1986 International Friendly	Canada	0–0	Paraguay	Vancouver, British Columbia
		Report		Stadium: BC Place Stadium; Attendance: 18,003

February 2, 1986 International Friendly	Uruguay	3–1	Canada	Miami, U.S.
	Aguilera 27'; Ostolaza 54'; Zalazar 60'	Report	Pakos 45+1'	Stadium: Orange Bowl; Attendance: 15,054; Referee: Joshua Schirmaier

February 5, 1986 International Friendly	United States	0–0	Canada	Miami, U.S.
		Report		Stadium: Orange Bowl; Attendance: 5,182; Referee: Joshua Schirmaier

April 27, 1986 International Friendly	Mexico	3–0	Canada	Mexico City, Mexico
	Aguirre (?); Flores (?); Negrete (?)	Report		Stadium: Estadio Azul; Attendance: 16,000

May 10, 1986 International Friendly	Canada	2–0	Wales	Toronto, Ontario
15:00 UTC−4	Vrablic 35'; Gray 45'	Report		Stadium: Varsity Stadium; Attendance: 13,142

May 19, 1986 International Friendly	Canada	0–3	Wales	Vancouver, British Columbia
19:30 UTC−4		Report	Saunders 10', 48'; Allen 80'	Stadium: BC Place Stadium; Attendance: 9,000

May 24, 1986 International Friendly	Canada	0–1	England	Burnaby, British Columbia
11:30 UTC−4		Report	Hateley 59'	Stadium: Swangard Stadium; Attendance: 8,150

June 1, 1986 1986 FIFA World Cup; Group C	Canada	0–1	France	León, Mexico
16:00 CST		Report	Papin 79'	Stadium: Estadio Nou Camp; Attendance: 36,000; Referee: Hernán Silva

June 6, 1986 1986 FIFA World Cup; Group C	Hungary	2–0	Canada	Irapuato, Mexico
12:00 CST	Esterházy 2'; Détári 75'	Report		Stadium: Estadio Sergio León Chavez; Attendance: 13,800; Referee: Jamal Al Sharif

June 9, 1986 1986 FIFA World Cup; Group C	Soviet Union	2–0	Canada	Irapuato, Mexico
12:00 CST	Blokhin 58'; Zavarov 74'	Report		Stadium: Estadio Sergio León Chavez; Attendance: 14,200; Referee: Idrissa Traoré

August 24, 1986 Merlion Cup	Singapore	0–1	Canada	Kallang, Singapore
		Report	Vrablic 5' (pen.)	Stadium: Former National Stadium, Singapore; Attendance: 13,000; Referee: Alexis Vaughan

August 27, 1986 Merlion Cup	North Korea	0–0	Canada	Kallang, Singapore
		Report		Stadium: Former National Stadium, Singapore; Attendance: 2,628; Referee: Alexis Vaughan

August 31, 1986 Merlion Cup	China	1–0	Canada	Kallang, Singapore
	(?)	Report		Stadium: Former National Stadium, Singapore; Attendance: 4,000; Referee: Pat Sweeney

September 4, 1986 Merlion Cup	North Korea	2–0	Canada	Kallang, Singapore
	(?); (?)	Report		Stadium: Former National Stadium, Singapore; Referee: Alexis Vaughan

September 6, 1986 Merlion Cup	Singapore	0–1	Canada	Kallang, Singapore
		Report	Bunbury 73'	Stadium: Former National Stadium, Singapore; Referee: Alexis Vaughan

=== 1987 ===
September 30, 1987 International Friendly	El Salvador	2–1	Canada	San Salvador, El Salvador
	(?); (?)	Report	Bunbury (?)	Stadium: Estadio Cuscatlán; Attendance: 25,000; Referee: Alexis Vaughan

October 2, 1987 International Friendly	Honduras	1–1	Canada	Tegucigalpa, Honduras
19:00 UTC−4	(?)	Report	Catliff	Stadium: Estadio Tiburcio Carías Andino; Attendance: 30,000; Referee: Alexis Vaughan

October 6, 1987 International Friendly	Mexico	4–0	Canada	Toluca, Mexico
	Hernández (?); Flores (?); Negrete (?); Hermosillo (?)	Report		Stadium: Estadio Nemesio Díez; Attendance: 20,000; Referee: Alexis Vaughan

=== 1988 ===
February 18, 1988 International Friendly	Bermuda	0–0	Canada	Hamilton, Bermuda, Bermuda
		Report		Referee: Alexis Vaughan

March 26, 1988 International Friendly	Peru	1–3	Canada	Lima, Peru
18:30 UTC−4	41'	Report	Hooper 62'; De Santis 65'; Catliff 73'	Attendance: 45,000; Referee: Alexis Vaughan

March 30, 1988 International Friendly	Colombia	3–0	Canada	Armenia, Colombia
	20'; 44'; 60'	Report		Stadium: Estadio Centenario; Attendance: 35,000; Referee: Alexis Vaughan

April 5, 1988 International Friendly	Jamaica	0–4	Canada	Kingston, Jamaica
		Report	Catliff 33', 42', 52'; Grimes 89'	Stadium: Independence Park; Referee: Alexis Vaughan

April 7, 1988 International Friendly	Jamaica	0–0	Canada	Montego Bay, Jamaica
		Report		Stadium: Jarrett Park; Attendance: 6,000; Referee: Alexis Vaughan

April 12, 1988 International Friendly	Canada	1–0	Mexico	Victoria, British Columbia
	Pignatiello 52'	Report		Stadium: Royal Athletic Park; Attendance: 1,800

April 14, 1988 International Friendly	Canada	1–1	Mexico	Burnaby, British Columbia
19:30 UTC−4	Catliff 44'	Report	64'	Stadium: Swangard Stadium; Attendance: 3,202

May 19, 1988 International Friendly	Canada	0–1	Greece	Montreal, Quebec
		Report	6'	Attendance: 5,137; Referee: Alexis Vaughan

May 21, 1988 Matthews Cup	Canada	0–3	Greece	Toronto, Ontario
15:00 UTC−4		Report	26'; 52'; 72'	Stadium: Varsity Stadium; Attendance: 8,763; Referee: Alex Krakowiak

May 25, 1988 Matthews Cup	Canada	1–0	Chile	Toronto, Ontario
19:30 UTC−4	Bridge 90'	Report		Stadium: Varsity Stadium; Attendance: 4,178; Referee: Abdelaziz Tafer

May 28, 1988 Matthews Cup	Canada	0–0 (a.e.t.) (4–2 p)	Greece	Toronto, Ontario
15:00 UTC−4		Report		Stadium: Varsity Stadium; Attendance: 10,531; Referee: Justin Marques

June 17, 1988 International Friendly	Canada	0–1	Costa Rica	Montreal, Quebec
19:30 UTC−4		Report	39'	Stadium: Complexe sportif Claude-Robillard; Attendance: 1,300; Referee: Jacob Aulin

July 15, 1988 International Friendly	Canada	1–2	Poland	Toronto, Ontario
20:00 UTC−4	Concina 72'	Report	Rudy 58'; Ryszard Tarasiewicz 62'	Stadium: Varsity Stadium; Attendance: 4,113; Referee: Anton Pellerin-Petrov

October 2, 1988 International Friendly	Trinidad and Tobago	1–2	Canada	Port of Spain, Trinidad and Tobago
	28'	Report	Catliff 39'; Mitchell 69'	Stadium: Queen's Park Oval; Attendance: 4,113; Referee: Alexis Vaughan

October 9, 1988 1989 CONCACAF Championship qualification CONCACAF second round	Guatemala	1–0	Canada	Guatemala City, Guatemala
11:00 UTC−4	B. Pérez 21' (pen.)	Report		Stadium: Estadio Mateo Flores; Attendance: 17,065; Referee: Joshua Schirmaier

October 15, 1988 1989 CONCACAF Championship qualification CONCACAF second round	Canada	3–2	Guatemala	Burnaby, British Columbia
12:00 UTC−4	Mitchell 63', 82' (pen.); Bridge 89'	Report	Paniagua 7'; Castañeda 37'	Stadium: Swangard Stadium; Attendance: 5,300

=== 1989 ===
April 12, 1989 International Friendly	Denmark	2–0	Canada	Aalborg, Denmark
19:00 UTC−4	Elstrup 37'; 74' (o.g.)	Report		Stadium: Aalborg Stadion; Attendance: 10,400

April 14, 1989 International Friendly	Faroe Islands	1–0	Canada	Tórshavn, Faroe Islands
17:00 UTC−4	4'	Report		Attendance: 4,000; Referee: Alexis Vaughan

April 16, 1989 International Friendly	Faroe Islands	0–1	Canada	Tórshavn, Faroe Islands
15:00 UTC−4		Report	Ferguson (?)	Attendance: 4,000; Referee: Alexis Vaughan

June 8, 1989 International Friendly	Canada	0–2	Belgium	Ottawa, Ontario
19:30 UTC−4		Report	Ceulemans 56'; Degryse 86'	Stadium: Terry Fox Stadium; Attendance: 3,000; Referee: Alexis Vaughan

== Results (1990s) ==
=== 1990 ===
May 13, 1990 1990 NAFC Championship	Canada	2–1	Mexico	Burnaby, British Columbia
	Catliff 16', 87'	Report	Aguirre (red card) 65'; Flores 68' (pen.)	Stadium: Swangard Stadium; Attendance: 4,782

=== 1991 ===
March 16, 1991 1991 North American Nations Cup	United States	2–0	Canada	Torrance, U.S.
	Washington 13'; Murray 60'	Report		Stadium: Murdock Stadium; Attendance: 2,705; Referee: José Carlos Ortíz (Mexico)

June 28, 1991 1991 CONCACAF Gold Cup	Canada	2–4	Honduras	Los Angeles, U.S.
	Mitchell 66', 80'		Bennett 28' (pen.); Espinoza 34'; Cálix 41'; Flores 51'	Stadium: Los Angeles Memorial Coliseum; Attendance: 13,374; Referee: Arturo Angeles (United States)

June 30, 1991 1991 CONCACAF Gold Cup	Canada	1–3	Mexico	Los Angeles, U.S.
	Lowery 83'		Hermosillo 3'; de la Torre 40'; Galindo 89' (pen.)	Stadium: Los Angeles Memorial Coliseum; Attendance: 45,797; Referee: Ronald Gutiérrez (Costa Rica)

July 2, 1991 1991 CONCACAF Gold Cup	Jamaica	2–3	Canada	Los Angeles, U.S.
	Wright 42'; Reid 63'		Mitchell 34'; Miller 54'; Limniatis 60'	Stadium: Los Angeles Memorial Coliseum; Attendance: 36,703; Referee: José Carlos Ortíz (El Salvador)

=== 1992 ===
April 2, 1992 International Friendly	Canada	5–2	China	Victoria, British Columbia
	Catliff (?); Gilbert (?); Muirhead (?); Odinga (?)		(?); (?)

May 20, 1992 International Friendly	Canada	1–3	Scotland	Toronto, Ontario
	Catliff (?)		(?); (?); (?)

June 13, 1992 Columbus 500 Cup	Canada	3–1	Hong Kong	Toronto, Ontario
	Peschisolido 19'; Valentine 59'; Berdusco 78'		(?)

September 3, 1992 International Friendly	Canada	0–2	United States	Saint John, New Brunswick
			(?); (?)

October 18, 1992 1994 World Cup qualification	Jamaica	1–1	Canada	Kingston, Jamaica
	Wright 78'		Mitchell 85'	Stadium: Independence Park; Attendance: 17,000; Referee: Ramesh Ramdhan (Trinidad and Tobago)

October 25, 1992 1994 World Cup qualification	El Salvador	1–1	Canada	San Salvador, El Salvador
	González 32'		Miller 86'	Stadium: Estadio Cuscatlán; Attendance: 16,342; Referee: Victor Hugo Rodriguez Ugaldo (Costa Rica)

November 1, 1992 1994 World Cup qualification	Canada	1–0	Jamaica	Toronto, Ontario
	Mitchell 53'			Stadium: Varsity Stadium; Attendance: 8,131; Referee: Franklin Morales Trujillo (Guatemala)

November 1, 1992 1994 World Cup qualification	Canada	2–3	El Salvador	Toronto, Ontario
	Miller 13'; Mitchell 71'		Rivera 44'; Ulloa 52', 89'	Stadium: Varsity Stadium; Attendance: 6,278; Referee: Carlos Castellanos Orendain (Mexico)

November 8, 1992 1994 World Cup qualification	Canada	4–2	Bermuda	Burnaby, British Columbia
	Bunbury 9', 14', 35'; Aunger 86'		Goater 72'; Swan 76'	Stadium: Swangard Stadium; Attendance: 4,093; Referee: Leon Padro Borja (Mexico)

December 6, 1992 1994 World Cup qualification	Bermuda	0–0	Canada	Hamilton, Bermuda
				Stadium: Bermuda National Stadium; Attendance: 1,200; Referee: Ed Cummings (United States)

=== 1993 ===
March 4, 1993 International Friendly	United States	2–2	Canada	Costa Mesa, U.S.
	Kinnear 2'; Murray 64' (pen.)	Report	MacDonald 14'; Catliff 30'	Stadium: LeBard Stadium; Attendance: 5,743; Referee: Helder Dias (United States)

March 9, 1993 International Friendly	Canada	0–2	South Korea	Coquitlam, British Columbia
		Report	Kim Tae-young 18'; Kim Hyun-seok 87'	Stadium: Town Centre Stadium; Attendance: 1,554

March 11, 1993 International Friendly	Canada	2–0	South Korea	Victoria, British Columbia
	Catliff 20'; Berdusco 70'	Report		Stadium: Royal Athletic Park; Attendance: 800

March 24, 1993 International Friendly	Costa Rica	0–1	Canada	San José, Costa Rica
https://canadasoccer.com/national-team-match-past/?matchId=366		Report	Miller 83'

April 4, 1993 1994 World Cup qualification Final Round	Honduras	2–2	Canada	Tegucigalpa, Honduras
	Smith 41' (pen.); Obando 89' (pen.)		Catliff 34' (pen.); Bunbury 68'	Stadium: Estadio Tiburcio Carías Andino; Attendance: 30,000; Referee: Noel Smith (Jamaica)

April 11, 1993 1994 World Cup qualification Final Round	Canada	2–0	El Salvador	Burnaby, British Columbia
	Bunbury 25'; Catliff 33'			Stadium: Swangard Stadium; Attendance: 6,968; Referee: Ramesh Ramdhan (Trinidad and Tobago)

April 18, 1993 1994 World Cup qualification Final Round	Canada	3–1	Honduras	Burnaby, British Columbia
	Mobilio 52'; Bautista 62' (o.g.); Catliff 66' (pen.)		Pineda 17'	Stadium: Swangard Stadium; Attendance: 6,868; Referee: Nelson Rodriguez Fernandez (Venezuela)

April 25, 1993 1994 World Cup qualification Final Round	Mexico	4–0	Canada	Mexico City, Mexico
	Ramírez 20', 34'; Flores 53'; Garcia Aspe 68'			Stadium: Estadio Azteca; Attendance: 103,000; Referee: Berny Ulloa Morera (Costa Rica)

May 2, 1993 1994 World Cup qualification Final Round	El Salvador	1–2	Canada	San Salvador, El Salvador
	González 58'		Catliff 27'; Mobilio 60'	Stadium: Estadio Cuscatlán; Attendance: 25,000; Referee: Arlington Success (Antigua and Barbuda)

May 9, 1993 1994 World Cup qualification Final Round	Canada	1–2	Mexico	Toronto, Ontario
	Bunbury 17'		Sanchez 36'; Cruz 84'	Stadium: Varsity Stadium; Attendance: 12,000; Referee: Hellmut Krug (Germany)

July 11, 1993 1993 Gold Cup	Canada	1–1	Costa Rica	Mexico City, Mexico
	Dasovic 43'		Myers 81'	Stadium: Estadio Azteca; Attendance: 17,000; Referee: Mark Forde (Brazil)

July 15, 1993 1993 Gold Cup	Canada	2–2	Martinique	Mexico City, Mexico
	Aunger 25'; Bunbury 43'		Gertrude 53'; Fondelot 86'	Stadium: Estadio Azteca; Attendance: 31,000; Referee: Argelio Sabillón (Honduras)

July 18, 1993 1993 Gold Cup	Mexico	8–0	Canada	Estadio Azteca, Mexico City
	Rodríguez 4', 67'; Mora 24', 31'; Zague 34', 38'; Salvador 82', 85'			Attendance: 100,000; Referee: Raúl Domínguez (United States)

July 31, 1993 1994 World Cup qualification CONCACAF–OFC play-off	Canada	2–1	Australia	Edmonton, Alberta
20:30 UTC–6	Watson 50'; Mobilio 57'		Dasovic 44' (o.g.)	Stadium: Commonwealth Stadium; Attendance: 27,775; Referee: Arturo Carter (Mexico)

August 15, 1993 1994 World Cup qualification CONCACAF–OFC play-off	Australia	2–1 (3–3 agg.) (4–1 p)	Canada	Sydney, Australia
19:30 UTC+10	Farina 45'; Durakovic 77'		Hooper 54'	Stadium: Sydney Football Stadium; Attendance: 25,982; Referee: Shin-Ichiro Obata (Japan)
	Penalties
	Wade (penalty scored); A. Vidmar (penalty scored); Tobin (penalty scored); Farina (penalty scored)		(penalty scored) Mitchell; (penalty missed) Bunbury; (penalty missed) Sweeney

=== 1994 ===
June 1, 1994 International Friendly	Canada	1–1	Morocco	Montreal, Quebec
	Doliscat 90'	Report	Chaouch 57'	Stadium: Complexe sportif Claude-Robillard; Attendance: 3,816

June 5, 1994 International Friendly	Canada	1–1	Brazil	Edmonton, Alberta
	Berdusco 69'	Report	45'	Stadium: Commonwealth Stadium; Attendance: 51,936

June 8, 1994 International Friendly	Canada	0–2	Germany	Toronto, Ontario
		Report	Sammer 30'; Völler 90'	Stadium: Varsity Stadium; Attendance: 20,124

June 10, 1994 International Friendly	Canada	0–2	Spain	Montreal, Quebec
		Report	Salinas 9'; Juanele 85'	Stadium: Complexe sportif Claude-Robillard; Attendance: 5,256

June 12, 1994 International Friendly	Canada	0–3	Netherlands	Toronto, Ontario
		Report	Bergkamp 7'; Overmars 13'; Rijkaard 37'	Stadium: Varsity Stadium; Attendance: 20,104

=== 1995 ===
January 24, 1995 SkyDome Cup	Canada	0–1	Denmark	Toronto, Ontario
			Højer 52'	Stadium: SkyDome; Attendance: 10,024; Referee: Zimmerman Boulos (United States)

January 26, 1995 SkyDome Cup	Canada	1–1	Denmark	Toronto, Ontario
	Bunbury 82'		Folha 10'	Stadium: SkyDome; Attendance: 13,658; Referee: Zimmerman Boulos (United States)

May 22, 1995 1995 Canada Cup	Canada	2–0	Northern Ireland	Edmonton, Alberta
	Peschisolido 9', 23'			Stadium: Commonwealth Stadium; Attendance: 12,112; Referee: Brian Hall (United States)

May 28, 1995 1995 Canada Cup	Canada	1–2	Chile	Edmonton, Alberta
	Peschisolido 13'		Valencia 32'; Salas 87'	Stadium: Commonwealth Stadium; Attendance: 17,047; Referee: Tim Weyland (United States)

June 4, 1995 International Friendly	Canada	1–3	Turkey	Toronto, Ontario
	Thompson 47'	Report	Özalan 9'; Temizkanoglu 12'; Saglam 53'	Stadium: Varsity Stadium; Attendance: 8,000

June 7, 1995 International Friendly	Canada	0–3	Turkey	Montreal, Quebec
		Report	Yalcin 69'; Temizkanoglu 86'; Saglam 90'	Stadium: Complexe sportif Claude-Robillard; Attendance: 1,000

August 1, 1995 Caribana Cub	Canada	3–1	Jamaica	Toronto, Ontario
	Kouzmanis 34', 35'; Aunger 57'	Report	Lowe 33'	Stadium: Varsity Stadium; Attendance: 5,000

August 3, 1995 Caribana Cub	Canada	3–1	Trinidad and Tobago	Toronto, Ontario
	Kouzmanis 35', 50'; Peschisolido 71'	Report	Boisson 90'	Stadium: Varsity Stadium; Attendance: 3,000

October 11, 1995 International Friendly	Chile	2–0	Canada	Toronto, Ontario
	Rozental 47'; Salas 66'	Report		Stadium: Varsity Stadium; Attendance: 11,700

=== 1996 ===
January 10, 1996 1996 Gold Cup	Canada	3–1	Honduras	Anaheim, U.S.
	Corazzin 9'; Holness 27', 63'		Carson 40'	Stadium: Anaheim Stadium; Attendance: 27,125; Referee: Peter Prendergast (Jamaica)

January 12, 1996 1993 Gold Cup	Brazil	4–1	Canada	Los Angeles, U.S.
	André Luis 3'; Caio 7'; Sávio 14'; Leandro Machado 86'		Radzinski 66'	Stadium: Los Angeles Memorial Coliseum; Attendance: 8,234; Referee: Ronald Gutiérrez (Costa Rica)

June 5, 1996 International Friendly	Canada	1–0	Costa Rica	Toronto, Ontario
		Report	Gómez 80'	Stadium: Varsity Stadium; Attendance: 3,822

August 30, 1996 1998 World Cup qualification R3	Canada	3–1	Panama	Edmonton, Alberta
	Aunger 40'; Peschisolido 42'; Corazzin 87'		Dely Valdés 49'	Stadium: Commonwealth Stadium; Attendance: 5,255; Referee: Jose Emiliano Ramirez Suazo (Honduras)

October 10, 1996 1998 World Cup qualification R3	Canada	2–0	Cuba	Edmonton, Alberta
	Bunbury 29'; Peschisolido 53'			Stadium: Commonwealth Stadium; Attendance: 6,000; Referee: Ramesh Ramdhan (Trinidad and Tobago)

October 13, 1996 1998 World Cup qualification R3	Cuba	0–2	Canada	Edmonton, Alberta
	Peschisolido 15'; Dasovic 79'			Stadium: Commonwealth Stadium; Attendance: 10,000; Referee: Carlos Mendizabal Euceda (Guatemala)

October 27, 1996 1998 World Cup qualification R3	Panama	0–0	Canada	Panama City, Panama
				Stadium: Estadio Rommel Fernández; Attendance: 7,388; Referee: Carlos Batres (Guatemala)

November 3, 1996 1998 World Cup qualification R3	Canada	1–0	El Salvador	Burnaby, British Columbia
	Bunbury 65'			Stadium: Swangard Stadium; Attendance: 6,858; Referee: Ronald Gutiérrez (Costa Rica)

December 15, 1996 1998 World Cup qualification R3	El Salvador	0–2	Canada	San Salvador, El Salvador
			Watson 62'; Bunbury 66'	Stadium: Estadio Cuscatlan; Attendance: 15,233; Referee: Brizio Carter (Mexico)

=== 1997 ===
March 2, 1997 1998 World Cup qualification R4	Mexico	4–0	Canada	Mexico City, Mexico
	Hermosillo 51', 81'; Galindo 61' (pen.); Zague 88'			Stadium: Estadio Azteca; Attendance: 95,000; Referee: Argelio Sabillon (Honduras)

March 16, 1997 1998 World Cup qualification R4	United States	3–0	Canada	Stamford, U.S.
	Wynalda 7' (pen.); Pope 14'; Stewart 89'			Stadium: Stanford Stadium; Attendance: 28,896; Referee: Luis Oliveto (Argentina)

April 6, 1997 1998 World Cup qualification R4	Canada	0–0	El Salvador	Burnaby, British Columbia
				Stadium: Swangard Stadium; Attendance: 8,312; Referee: Fernando Sánchez (Chile)

April 27, 1997 1998 World Cup qualification R4	Canada	0–0	Jamaica	Burnaby, British Columbia
				Stadium: Swangard Stadium; Attendance: 7,634; Referee: Ramesh Ramdhan (Trinidad and Tobago)

June 1, 1997 1998 World Cup qualification R4	Canada	1–0	Costa Rica	Edmonton, Alberta
	Berdusco 68'			Stadium: Commonwealth Stadium; Attendance: 10,150; Referee: Nelson Calix (Honduras)

August 17, 1997 International Friendly	Canada	0–1	Iran	Toronto, Ontario
		Report	Bagheri 45'	Stadium: Varsity Stadium; Attendance: 15,325

September 7, 1997 1998 World Cup qualification R4	Jamaica	1–0	Canada	Independence Park, Kingston
	Burton 55'			Attendance: 30,000; Referee: Óscar Ruiz (Colombia)

September 14, 1997 1998 World Cup qualification R4	El Salvador	4–1	Canada	Estadio Cuscatlán, San Salvador
	Nildeson 16'; Renderos 52'; Cienfuegos 57'; Díaz Arce 88'		Bunbury 25'	Attendance: 27,767; Referee: Mario Efraín López (Guatemala)

October 12, 1997 1998 World Cup qualification R4	Canada	2–2	Mexico	Edmonton, Alberta
	Corazzin 56'; Bunbury 62'		Enrique Alfaro 8'; Hermosillo 87'	Stadium: Commonwealth Stadium; Attendance: 11,806; Referee: Carlos Mendizabal Euceda (Guatemala)

November 9, 1997 1998 World Cup qualification R4	Canada	0–3	United States	Swangard Stadium, Burnaby
			Reyna 5'; Wegerle 81', 90+4'	Attendance: 8,420; Referee: John Toro Rendón (Colombia)

November 16, 1997 1998 World Cup qualification R4	Costa Rica	3–1	Canada	San José, Costa Rica
	Smith 7'; Ilama 16'; Marín 89' (pen.)		Fletcher 47'	Stadium: Estadio Nacional; Attendance: 4,200; Referee: Antônio Pereira (Brazil)

=== 1998 ===
May 18, 1998 International Friendly	Canada	1–0	Macedonia	Toronto, Ontario
	Thompson 6'	Report		Stadium: Varsity Stadium; Attendance: 8,491

=== 1999 ===
April 27, 1999 International Friendly	Northern Ireland	1–1	Canada	Belfast, Northern Ireland
	McVeigh 90+2'	Report	Bircham 67'	Attendance: 7,663

May 29, 1999 International Friendly	Canada	1–0	Guatemala	Toronto, Ontario
	Xausa 5'	Report		Stadium: Varsity Stadium

June 2, 1999 1999 Canada Cup	Canada	2–0	Guatemala	Edmonton, Alberta
	Stalteri 42'; De Vos 62'			Stadium: Commonwealth Stadium; Attendance: 5,821; Referee: Kevin Terry (United States)

June 4, 1999 1999 Canada Cup	Canada	0–1	Iran	Edmonton, Alberta
	Daei 71'			Stadium: Commonwealth Stadium; Attendance: 8,865; Referee: Antonio Mendoza (United States)

June 6, 1999 1999 Canada Cup	Canada	1–2	Ecuador	Edmonton, Alberta
	Xausa 50'		Graziani 17'; DeVos 54' (o.g.)	Stadium: Commonwealth Stadium; Attendance: 10,026; Referee: Antonio Marrufo (Mexico)

July 9, 1999 International Friendly	Canada	0–2	Saudi Arabia	Fullerton, U.S.
		Report	Suwayed 76'; Abdulghani 90'

September 2, 1999 International Friendly	Canada	1–0	Jamaica	Toronto, Ontario
	Brennan 53'	Report		Stadium: Varsity Stadium; Attendance: 8,568

October 6, 1999 2000 Gold Cup qualification	Canada	0–0	Cuba	Los Angeles, U.S.
				Stadium: Los Angeles Memorial Coliseum; Attendance: 6,583; Referee: Argelio Sabillón (Honduras)

October 8, 1999 2000 Gold Cup qualification	Canada	2–1	El Salvador	Los Angeles, U.S.
	Corazzin 9'; Fletcher 59'		Díaz Arce 47' (pen.); Cienfuegos (red card) 38'	Stadium: Los Angeles Memorial Coliseum; Attendance: 6,507; Referee: Benito Archundia (Mexico)

October 10, 1999 2000 Gold Cup qualification	Canada	1–0	Haiti	Los Angeles, U.S.
	Corazzin 9', 43'		Descolines 48'; Thélusma (red card) 75'	Stadium: Los Angeles Memorial Coliseum; Attendance: 3,605; Referee: Argelio Sabillón (Honduras)
