= 1985 CONCACAF Championship =

Tournament details
- Dates: 24 February – 14 September
- Teams: 9 (from 1 confederation)

Final positions
- Champions: Canada (1st title)
- Runners-up: Honduras
- Third place: Costa Rica

Tournament statistics
- Matches played: 24
- Goals scored: 54 (2.25 per match)
- Top scorer: (Honduras) José Roberto Figueroa (5 goals)

The 1985 CONCACAF Championship was the ninth edition of the CONCACAF Championship. It also served as the qualification for the 1986 World Cup. A total of 18 CONCACAF teams entered the competition. The North, Central American and Caribbean zone was allocated 2 places (out of 24) in the final tournament. Mexico, the World Cup host, qualified automatically, leaving 1 spot open for competition between 17 teams. Canada earned their first major title and clinched qualification on 14 September 1985 to participate in their first World Cup after beating Honduras 2–1 at King George V Park in St. John's, Newfoundland.

== Teams ==
- Canada
- Costa Rica
- El Salvador
- Guatemala
- Haiti
- Honduras
- Trinidad and Tobago
- Suriname
- United States

== Final tournament ==
=== First round ===
==== Group 1 ====
Pos	Team	Pld	W	D	L	GF	GA	GD	Pts
1	Honduras (A)	4	2	2	0	5	3	+2	6
2	El Salvador	4	2	1	1	7	2	+5	5
3	Suriname	4	0	1	3	2	9	−7	1

Source: RSSSF El Balon Cuscatleco
(A) Advanced to final round
24 February 1985

Suriname	0–3	El Salvador
		Alfaro 25'; Huezo 52'; Hernández 89'

Estadio Cuscatlán, San Salvador
Attendance: 35,652
Referee: Berny Ulloa Morera (Costa Rica)

27 February 1985

El Salvador	3–0	Suriname
Rivas 49', 87'; Zapata 70'

Estadio Cuscatlán, San Salvador
Attendance: 18,918
Referee: Mario Escobar López (Guatemala)

3 March 1985

Suriname	1–1	Honduras
Entingh 32'		Laing 40'

Estadio Nacional Chelato Uclés, Tegucigalpa, Honduras
Attendance: 35,000
Referee: Mamerto Negreros (Guatemala)

6 March 1985

Honduras	2–1	Suriname
Figueroa 9', 77'		Stjeward 86'

Estadio Nacional Chelato Uclés, Tegucigalpa, Honduras
Attendance: 27,453
Referee: Alfaro Venegas (Costa Rica)

10 March 1985

El Salvador	1–2	Honduras
Rivas 63'		Bailey 1'; Laing 77'

Estadio Cuscatlán, San Salvador
Attendance: 51,555
Referee: David Socha (United States)

14 March 1985

Honduras	0–0	El Salvador

Estadio Nacional Chelato Uclés, Tegucigalpa, Honduras
Attendance: 38,175
Referee: Tony Evangelista (Canada)

==== Group 2 ====
Pos	Team	Pld	W	D	L	GF	GA	GD	Pts
1	Canada (A)	4	3	1	0	7	2	+5	7
2	Guatemala	4	2	1	1	7	3	+4	5
3	Haiti	4	0	0	4	0	9	−9	0

Source: RSSSF
(A) Advanced to final round
13 April 1985

Canada	2–0	Haiti
Vrablic 30'; Sweeney 41'

Royal Athletic Park, Victoria, Canada
Attendance: 5,000
Referee: Angelo Bratsis (United States)

20 April 1985

Canada	2–1	Guatemala
Mitchell 22', 43'		Gómez 66'

Royal Athletic Park, Victoria, Canada
Attendance: 5,000
Referee: Edgardo Codesal (Mexico)

26 April 1985

Haiti	0–1	Guatemala
		Estrada 79'

Stade Sylvio Cator, Port-au-Prince, Haiti
Referee: Edward Bellion (United States)

5 May 1985

Guatemala	1–1	Canada
B. Pérez 42'		Mitchell 39'

Estadio Doroteo Guamuch Flores, Guatemala City, Guatemala
Attendance: 60,000
Referee: Luis Paulino Siles (Costa Rica)

8 May 1985

Haiti	0–2	Canada
		Mitchell 14'; Vrablic 56'

Stade Sylvio Cator, Port-au-Prince, Haiti
Attendance: 7,000
Referee: Rex Osborne (Bermuda)

15 May 1985

Guatemala	4–0	Haiti
Chacón 44'; Galindo 48'; Funes 62'; Solórzano 71'

Estadio Doroteo Guamuch Flores, Guatemala City, Guatemala
Referee: Rodolfo Martinez Mejia (Honduras)

==== Group 3 ====
Pos	Team	Pld	W	D	L	GF	GA	GD	Pts
1	Costa Rica (A)	4	2	2	0	6	2	+4	6
2	United States	4	2	1	1	4	3	+1	5
3	Trinidad and Tobago	4	0	1	3	2	7	−5	1

Source: RSSSF US Soccer History
(A) Advanced to final round
24 April 1985

Trinidad and Tobago	0–3	Costa Rica
		Williams 15'; Lacey 65'; Nóbrega 79'

Estadio Nacional de Costa Rica, San José, Costa Rica
Attendance: 9,689
Referee: Rodolfo Martinez Mejia (Honduras)

28 April 1985

Costa Rica	1–1	Trinidad and Tobago
Ulate 57'		De Noon 18'

Estadio Ricardo Saprissa Aymá, San Juan de Tibás, Costa Rica
Attendance: 10,839
Referee: Rómulo Méndez (Guatemala)

15 May 1985

United States	2–1	Trinidad and Tobago
Borja 29'; Peterson 89'		Fonrose 19'

Busch Stadium, St. Louis, United States
Attendance: 15,823
Referee: Robert Allen (Canada)

19 May 1985

Trinidad and Tobago	0–1	United States
		Caligiuri 15'

Murdock Stadium, Torrance, United States
Attendance: 6,115
Referee: Jorge Leanza Sansone (Mexico)

26 May 1985

Costa Rica	1–1	United States
Ramírez 42'		Kerr 44'

Estadio Alejandro Morera Soto, Alajuela, Costa Rica
Attendance: 20,173
Referee: Joaquin Urrea Reyes (Mexico)

31 May 1985

United States	0–1	Costa Rica
		Coronado 35'

Murdock Stadium, Torrance, United States
Attendance: 11,800
Referee: John Meachin (Canada)

=== Final round ===
Pos	Team	Pld	W	D	L	GF	GA	GD	Pts	Qualification	(Canada)	(Honduras)	(Costa Rica)
1	Canada (C)	4	2	2	0	4	2	+2	6	1986 FIFA World Cup	—	2–1	1–1
2	Honduras	4	1	1	2	6	6	0	3		0–1	—	3–1
3	Costa Rica	4	0	3	1	4	6	−2	3		0–0	2–2	—

Source: RSSSF
(C) Champions

Canada qualified for the 1986 FIFA World Cup.

11 August 1985

Costa Rica	2–2	Honduras
Solano 19'; Williams 81'		Figueroa 8' (pen.); Betancourt 24'

Estadio Nacional, San José, Costa Rica
Attendance: 20,043
Referee: Edward Bellion (United States)

17 August 1985

Canada	1–1	Costa Rica
James 58'		Williams 12'

Varsity Stadium, Toronto, Canada
Attendance: 13,486
Referee: Enrique Mendoza Guillén (Mexico)

25 August 1985

Honduras	0–1	Canada
		Pakos 58'

Estadio Nacional, Tegucigalpa, Honduras
Attendance: 37,000
Referee: Charles Marshall (Bermuda)

1 September 1985

Costa Rica	0–0	Canada

Estadio Nacional, San José, Costa Rica
Attendance: 23,398
Referee: José Ortiz Cardoza (El Salvador)

8 September 1985

Honduras	3–1	Costa Rica
Betancourt 40'; Figueroa 51', 56' (pen.)		Guimarães 7'

Estadio Nacional, Tegucigalpa, Honduras
Referee: Richard Ramcharan (Trinidad and Tobago)

14 September 1985

Canada	2–1	Honduras
Pakos 15'; Vrablic 61'		Betancourt 49'

King George V Park, St. John's, Canada
Attendance: 13,000
Referee: Rómulo Méndez (Guatemala)

1985 CONCACAF Championship winners

Canada
First title

== Qualified teams ==
Canada won the 1985 CONCACAF Championship and thereby qualified for the 1986 FIFA World Cup.

Team	Qualified as	Qualified on	Previous appearances in FIFA World Cup^{1}
Canada	Final round winners	14 September 1985	0 (debut)

^{1} Bold indicates champions for that year. Italic indicates hosts for that year.

== Goalscorers ==
5 goals

- (Honduras) José Roberto Figueroa

4 goals

- (Canada) Dale Mitchell

3 goals

- (Canada) Igor Vrablic
- (Costa Rica) Johnny Williams
- (El Salvador) José María Rivas
- (Honduras) Porfirio Armando Betancourt

2 goals

- (Canada) George Pakos
- (Guatemala) Byron Pérez
- (Honduras) Eduardo Laing

1 goal

- (Canada) Mike Sweeney
- (Canada) Paul James
- (Costa Rica) Alexandre Guimarães
- (Costa Rica) Alvaro Solano
- (Costa Rica) Evaristo Coronado
- (Costa Rica) Miguel Lacey
- (Costa Rica) Milton Noriega
- (Costa Rica) Oscar Ramírez
- (Costa Rica) Jorge Manuel Ulate
- (El Salvador) Baltazar Zapata
- (El Salvador) Ever Hernández
- (El Salvador) Mauricio Alfaro
- (El Salvador) Wilfredo Huezo
- (Guatemala) Eduardo Estrada Aquino
- (Guatemala) Raul Galindo
- (Guatemala) Julio Gómez Rendón
- (Guatemala) Juan Manuel Funes
- (Guatemala) Raúl Chacón
- (Honduras) Roberto Bailey
- (Suriname) Kenneth Stewart
- (Suriname) Rinaldo Entingh
- (Trinidad and Tobago) Necik De Noon
- (Trinidad and Tobago) Adrian Fonrose
- (United States) Chico Borja
- (United States) John Kerr, Jr.
- (United States) Mark Peterson
- (United States) Paul Caligiuri

== See also ==
- 2000 CONCACAF Gold Cup
