= Ulate =

Ulate is a name. Notable people with the name include:

- Otilio Ulate Blanco (1891–1973), President of Costa Rica
- Jorge Ulate (born 1956), Costa Rican footballer
