= 1998 FIFA World Cup qualification – CONCACAF fourth round =

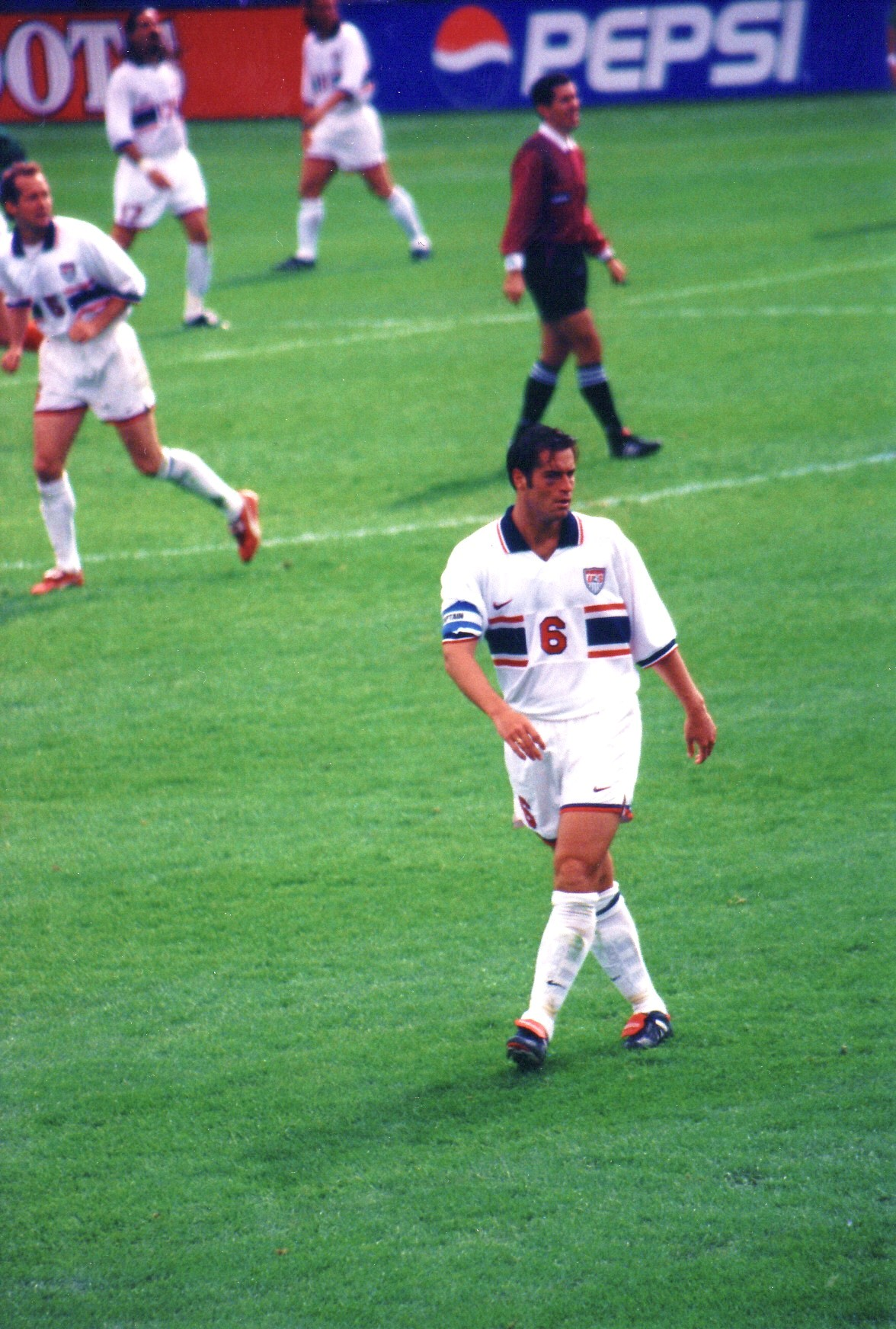
John Harkes playing for the United States in a qualifying match against Mexico on April 20, 1997

The fourth and final round (also known as Hexagonal or Hex) of CONCACAF's process of 1998 FIFA World Cup qualification was played throughout 1997, from 2 March to 16 November. It was the first Hexagonal final round in CONCACAF's history.

Mexico, the United States, and Jamaica qualified to the 1998 FIFA World Cup. Costa Rica, El Salvador, and Canada were eliminated.

== Format ==
A total of six teams which had advanced from the 1998 FIFA World Cup qualification – CONCACAF third round (the three group winners and the three group runners-up) played against each other in a double round-robin format in a single group. The top three teams in the group qualified to the 1998 FIFA World Cup. This round, known as Hexagonal, is the first used by CONCACAF to determine its qualified teams to a FIFA World Cup and was used through the 2018 World Cup qualifying cycle.

== Qualified teams ==
Group (3rd round)	Winners	Runners-up
1	United States	Costa Rica
2	Canada	El Salvador
3	Jamaica	Mexico

== Standings ==
Pos	Team	Pld	W	D	L	GF	GA	GD	Pts	Qualification	Mexico	United States	Jamaica	Costa Rica	El Salvador	Canada
1	Mexico	10	4	6	0	23	7	+16	18	Qualification to 1998 FIFA World Cup	—	0–0	6–0	3–3	5–0	4–0
2	United States	10	4	5	1	17	9	+8	17	Qualification to 1998 FIFA World Cup	2–2	—	1–1	1–0	4–2	3–0
3	Jamaica	10	3	5	2	7	12	−5	14	Qualification to 1998 FIFA World Cup	0–0	0–0	—	1–0	1–0	1–0
4	Costa Rica	10	3	3	4	13	12	+1	12		0–0	3–2	3–1	—	0–0	3–1
5	El Salvador	10	2	4	4	11	16	−5	10		0–1	1–1	2–2	2–1	—	4–1
6	Canada	10	1	3	6	5	20	−15	6		2–2	0–3	0–0	1–0	0–0	—

Source: FIFA
Rules for classification: Qualification tiebreakers

== Matches ==
March 2, 1997

Mexico	4–0	Canada
Hermosillo 51', 81'; Galindo 61' (pen.); Zague 88'	Report

Estadio Azteca, Mexico City
Attendance: 95,000
Referee: Argelio Sabillon (Honduras)
March 2, 1997

Jamaica	0–0	United States
	Report

Independence Park, Kingston
Attendance: 35,246
Referee: Jose Ramirez Suazo (Honduras)

March 16, 1997

United States	3–0	Canada
Wynalda 7' (pen.); Pope 14'; Stewart 89'	Report

Stanford Stadium, Stanford
Attendance: 28,896
Referee: Luis Oliveto (Argentina)
March 16, 1997

Costa Rica	0–0	Mexico
	Report

Estadio Ricardo Saprissa Aymá, San José
Attendance: 28,000
Referee: Alberto Tejada (Peru)

March 23, 1997

Costa Rica	3–2	United States
Medford 10'; Solís 32'; Gómez 76'	Report	Wynalda 25'; Lassiter 67'

Estadio Ricardo Saprissa Aymá, San José
Attendance: 22,000
Referee: Mario Escobar (Guatemala)

April 6, 1997

Canada	0–0	El Salvador
	Report

Swangard Stadium, Burnaby
Attendance: 8,312
Referee: Fernando Sánchez (Chile)

April 13, 1997

Mexico	6–0	Jamaica
Galindo 10' (pen.); Hermosillo 18', 39', 47' del Olmo 52'; Hernándéz 85'	Report

Estadio Azteca, Mexico City
Attendance: 115,100
Referee: Antônio Pereira (Brazil)

April 20, 1997

United States	2–2	Mexico
Pope 35'; Ramírez 74' (o.g.)	Report	Hermosillo 1'; Hernández 54'

Foxboro Stadium, Foxborough
Attendance: 57,877
Referee: Ubaldo Aquino (Paraguay)

April 27, 1997

Canada	0–0	Jamaica
	Report

Swangard Stadium, Burnaby
Attendance: 7,634
Referee: Ramesh Ramdhan (Trinidad and Tobago)

May 4, 1997

El Salvador	2–1	Costa Rica
Díaz Arce 19'; Montes 57'	Report	Arnáez 58'

Estadio Cuscatlán, San Salvador
Attendance: 35,611
Referee: Óscar Ruiz (Colombia)

May 11, 1997

Costa Rica	3–1	Jamaica
Wanchope 31', 71'; Oviedo 89'	Report	Williams 61'

Estadio Ricardo Saprissa Aymá, San José
Attendance: 20,500
Referee: José de Rosa Varela (Uruguay)

May 18, 1997

Jamaica	1–0	El Salvador
Williams 22'	Report

Independence Park, Kingston
Attendance: 12,000
Referee: Márcio Rezende de Freitas (Brazil)

June 1, 1997

Canada	1–0	Costa Rica
Berdusco 68'	Report

Commonwealth Stadium, Edmonton
Attendance: 10,150
Referee: Nelson Calix (Honduras)

June 8, 1997

El Salvador	0–1	Mexico
	Report	García Postigo 64'

Estadio Cuscatlán, San Salvador
Attendance: 40,000
Referee: Hugo Cordero (Argentina)

June 29, 1997

El Salvador	1–1	United States
Díaz Arce 60'	Report	Lassiter 57'

Estadio Cuscatlán, San Salvador
Attendance: 29,000
Referee: René Ortubé (Bolivia)

August 10, 1997

Costa Rica	0–0	El Salvador
	Report

Estadio Ricardo Saprissa Aymá, San José
Attendance: 18,316
Referee: Nelson Cálix (Honduras)

September 7, 1997

United States	1–0	Costa Rica
Ramos 79'	Report

Portland Civic Stadium, Portland
Attendance: 27,396
Referee: Jorge Luis Nieves (Uruguay)
September 7, 1997

Jamaica	1–0	Canada
Burton 55'	Report

Independence Park, Kingston
Attendance: 30,000
Referee: Óscar Ruiz (Colombia)

September 14, 1997

Jamaica	1–0	Costa Rica
Burton 51'	Report

Independence Park, Kingston
Attendance: 30,000
Referee: Ramesh Ramdhan (Trinidad and Tobago)
September 14, 1997

El Salvador	4–1	Canada
Nildeson 16'; Renderos 52'; Cienfuegos 57'; Díaz Arce 88'	Report	Bunbury 25'

Estadio Cuscatlán, San Salvador
Attendance: 27,767
Referee: Mario Efraín López (Guatemala)

October 3, 1997
21:10 (UTC-4)

United States	1–1	Jamaica
Wynalda 50' (pen.)	Report	Burton 51'

Robert F. Kennedy Memorial Stadium, Washington, D.C.
Attendance: 51,528
Referee: Mario Sánchez (Chile)
October 5, 1997
17:10 (UTC-5)

Mexico	5–0	El Salvador
Galindo 30', 38' (pen.); García Aspe 35'; Zague 48'; García 82'	Report

Estadio Azteca, Mexico City
Attendance: 115,000
Referee: Eduardo Gamboa (Chile)

October 12, 1997

Canada	2–2	Mexico
Corazzin 56'; Bunbury 62'	Report	Enrique Alfaro 8'; Hermosillo 87'

Commonwealth Stadium, Edmonton
Attendance: 11,806
Referee: Carlos Mendizabal Euceda (Guatemala)

November 2, 1997

Mexico	0–0	United States
	Report

Estadio Azteca, Mexico City
Attendance: 115,000
Referee: Javier Castrilli (Argentina)

November 9, 1997

Canada	0–3	United States
	Report	Reyna 5'; Wegerle 81', 90+4'

Swangard Stadium, Burnaby
Attendance: 8,420
Referee: John Toro Rendón (Colombia)
November 9, 1997

El Salvador	2–2	Jamaica
Nildeson 47'; Guerra 87'	Report	Burton 52'; Hall 78'

Estadio Cuscatlán, San Salvador
Attendance: 34,200
Referee: José García Aranda (Spain)
November 9, 1997

Mexico	3–3	Costa Rica
Chávez 1'; Galindo 42'; Hermosillo 68'	Report	Medford 54'; Soto 71'; Wanchope 86'

Estadio Azteca, Mexico City
Attendance: 60,000
Referee: Ali Bujsaim (United Arab Emirates)

November 16, 1997

Costa Rica	3–1	Canada
Smith 7'; Ilama 16'; Marín 89' (pen.)	Report	Fletcher 47'

Estadio Nacional, San José
Attendance: 4,200
Referee: Antônio Pereira (Brazil)
November 16, 1997

United States	4–2	El Salvador
McBride 22', 28'; Henderson 49'; Preki 82'	Report	Nildeson 60'; Díaz Arce 62' (pen.)

Foxboro Stadium, Foxborough
Attendance: 53,193
Referee: Pierluigi Collina (Italy)
November 16, 1997

Jamaica	0–0	Mexico
	Report

Independence Park, Kingston
Attendance: 35,700
Referee: José Antonio Arana (Peru)

== Goalscorers ==
There were 76 goals scored in 30 matches, for an average of 2.53 goals per match.

8 goals

- (Mexico) Carlos Hermosillo

5 goals

- (Mexico) Benjamín Galindo

4 goals

- (El Salvador) Raúl Díaz Arce
- (Jamaica) Deon Burton

3 goals

- (Costa Rica) Paulo Wanchope
- (El Salvador) Nildeson
- (United States) Eric Wynalda

2 goals

- (Canada) Alex Bunbury
- (Costa Rica) Hernan Medford
- (Jamaica) Andy Williams
- (Mexico) Luis García
- (Mexico) Luis Hernández
- (Mexico) Zague
- (United States) Roy Lassiter
- (United States) Brian McBride
- (United States) Eddie Pope
- (United States) Roy Wegerle

1 goal

- (Canada) Eddy Berdusco
- (Canada) Carlo Corazzin
- (Canada) Carl Fletcher
- (Costa Rica) Luis Diego Arnáez
- (Costa Rica) Rónald Gómez
- (Costa Rica) Farlen Ilama
- (Costa Rica) Luis Marín
- (Costa Rica) Allan Oviedo
- (Costa Rica) Richard Smith
- (Costa Rica) Mauricio Solís
- (Costa Rica) Jafet Soto
- (El Salvador) Mauricio Cienfuegos
- (El Salvador) Waldir Guerra
- (El Salvador) Elías Montes
- (El Salvador) William Renderos
- (Jamaica) Paul Hall
- (Mexico) Enrique Alfaro
- (Mexico) Paulo César Chávez
- (Mexico) Joaquín del Olmo
- (Mexico) Alberto García
- (United States) Chris Henderson
- (United States) Preki
- (United States) Tab Ramos
- (United States) Claudio Reyna
- (United States) Earnie Stewart

1 own goal

- (Mexico) Nicolás Ramírez (against the United States)
