= Kylie Bunbury =

Canadian actress (born 1989)

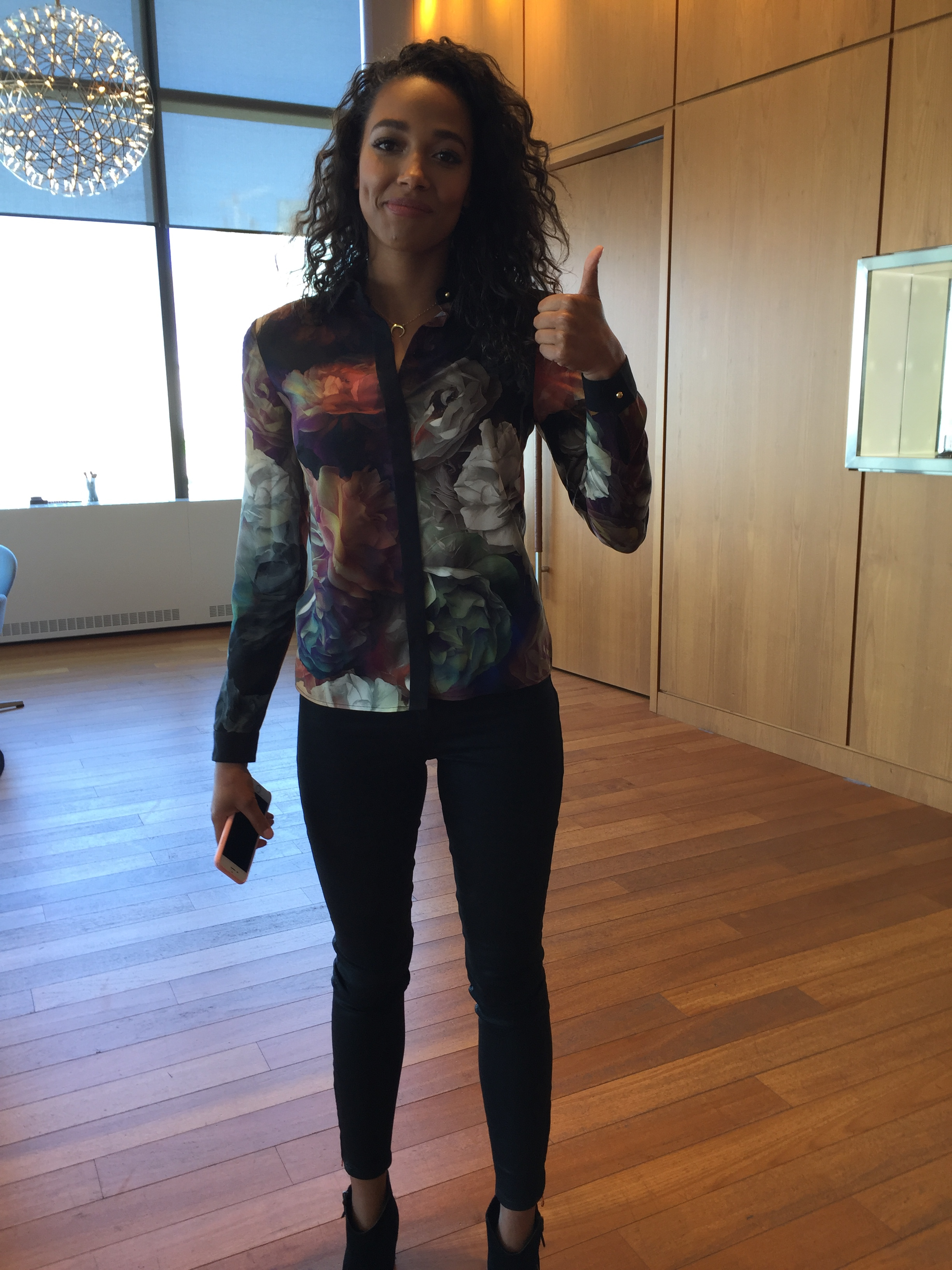
- Bunbury in 2019
- Born: January 30, 1989 (age 37); Montreal, Quebec, Canada
- Occupation: Actress
- Years active: 2010–present
- Spouse: Jon-Ryan Alan Riggins (m. 2020)
- Children: 2
- Father: Alex Bunbury
- Relatives: Teal Bunbury (brother); Mataeo Bunbury (brother)

Kylie Bunbury (born January 30, 1989) is a Canadian actress.

== Life ==
Bunbury was born in Montreal, Canada, to Kristi Novak and Alex Bunbury, a soccer player. Her father is Guyanese-Canadian and her mother is an American of Polish and Swedish descent. She spent her childhood in England (for two years), Madeira, Portugal (for seven years) and Prior Lake, Minnesota, US. She considers Prior Lake home. She has three younger brothers: Teal, Mataeo, and Logan.

Bunbury became engaged to Jon-Ryan Alan Riggins on April 8, 2018. They married on January 1, 2020. They have two children: a son born in 2021 and a daughter born in 2024.

== Career ==
Bunbury originally worked as a model, and began acting at her agency's suggestion. She landed her first role as Kathleen in Days of Our Lives for one episode. She also had roles in Prom and The Sitter. Bunbury portrayed Eva in the science fiction CBS television series Under the Dome. Bunbury starred in the Fox drama series Pitch, where she portrayed the (fictional) first female player in Major League Baseball. Pitch was canceled by Fox after one season on May 1, 2017.

Bunbury starred as Angie Richardson in the Netflix miniseries When They See Us, which premiered on May 31, 2019.

In 2020, Bunbury was in the main cast for the Peacock adaptation of Aldous Huxley's Brave New World. The series was cancelled after one season. That same year, she began playing Cassie Dewell in the ABC crime drama series Big Sky.

== Filmography ==
=== Film ===
Year	Title	Role	Notes
2011	Prom	Jordan Lundley	
2011	The Sitter	Roxanne	
2014	No Kid-ing!	Lauren	Short film
2018	Game Night	Michelle Sterling	
2020	Eat Wheaties!	Allison	
2021	Warning	Anna	

=== Television ===
Year	Title	Role	Notes
2010	Days of Our Lives	Kathleen	Episode: #1.11388
2013–2014	Twisted	Lacey Porter	Main role; 19 episodes
2015	Under the Dome	Eva Sinclair / Dawn Sinclair-Barbara	Main role (season 3); 13 episodes
2015	Tut	Suhad	Television miniseries
2016	Pitch	Genevieve "Ginny" Baker	Lead role; 10 episodes
2017	Law & Order: Special Victims Unit	Detective Devin Holiday	Episode: "Chasing Demons"
2018	Robot Chicken	Helga Pataki / Oscar's Mom / Girl (voices)	Episode: "Jew No. 1 Opens a Treasure Chest"
2018	Get Christie Love	Christie Love	TV film
2019	When They See Us	Angie Richardson	Main role, 4 episodes
2020	The Twilight Zone	Claudia	Episode: "Try, Try"
2020	Brave New World	Frannie Crowne	Main role
2020–2023	Big Sky	Cassie Dewell	Lead role
