= Teal Bunbury =

American soccer player (born 1990)

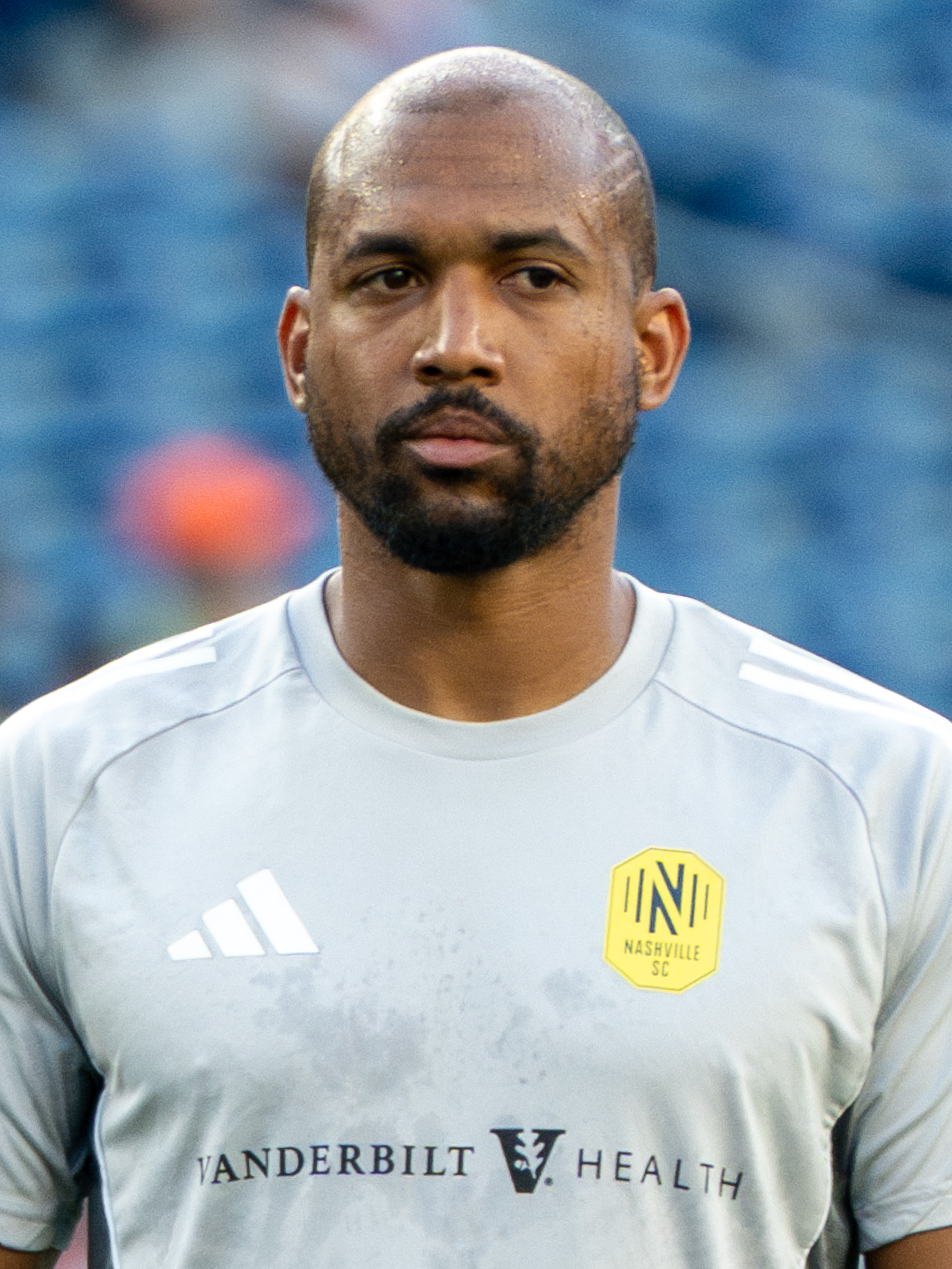
- Bunbury with Nashville SC in 2025

Personal information
- Full name: Teal Alexander Bunbury
- Date of birth: February 27, 1990 (age 36)
- Place of birth: Hamilton, Ontario, Canada
- Height: 6 ft 2 in (1.88 m)
- Positions: Forward; winger

Youth career
- 2006–2007: Valley United Juventus

College career
| Years | Team | Apps | (Gls) |
| 2008–2009 | Akron Zips | 48 | (23) |

Senior career*
| Years | Team | Apps | (Gls) |
| 2009 | Rochester Thunder | 11 | (5) |
| 2010–2013 | Sporting Kansas City | 89 | (19) |
| 2014–2021 | New England Revolution | 231 | (45) |
| 2022–2025 | Nashville SC | 75 | (11) |

International career^{‡}
| 2007 | Canada U17 | 1 | (0) |
| 2008–2009 | Canada U20 | 2 | (1) |
| 2012 | United States U23 | 3 | (0) |
| 2010–2012 | United States | 4 | (1) |
- * Club domestic league appearances and goals as of October 23, 2024 ‡ National team caps and goals as of November 25, 2014

Teal Alexander Bunbury (born February 27, 1990) is a professional soccer player who plays as a forward. Born in Canada, he played for the United States national team.

== Early life ==
Bunbury was born in Hamilton, Ontario to Kristi Novak, an American of Polish and Swedish descent, and Alex Bunbury, a Guyanese-born, Canadian professional soccer player who is the twelfth most capped player for the Canadian men's soccer team. He has an older sister, actress Kylie Bunbury, and two younger brothers, Logan and Mataeo, the latter of whom is also a professional soccer player.

At the age of two, he left Canada to travel with his family, at first to England, where his father played briefly, and then to Portugal. When he was 10 years old, he moved to the United States with his family and has lived there since. He grew up in Prior Lake, Minnesota and attended Shattuck-St. Mary's High School.

== Club career ==
=== College and amateur ===
Bunbury's first club was Apple Valley Juventus, followed by college soccer at the University of Akron. He made a total of 35 starts and appeared in 48 games with the Zips during the 2008 and 2009 seasons. In his first season, he made 23 appearances, starting ten games and scoring six goals, a total second only to future SuperDraft pick Steve Zakuani, who led the NCAA in scoring with 20.

After Steve Zakuani was selected first overall in the 2009 MLS SuperDraft, Bunbury began to shine for Akron. As a sophomore, he started all 25 games for the Zips, including the 2009 Division I Men's College Cup final. Bunbury led the team and the nation in goals, scoring 17 during the year, led the team in shots (103) and tied with fellow forward, Darlington Nagbe, in game-winning goals (5). Bunbury earned many accolades during the 2009 season, including the Mid-American Conference's Player of the Week award three times and same award by College Soccer News, once. He was also named to Top Drawer Soccer's national Team of the Week during the season. At the end of the season he was named as the winner of the 2009 Hermann Trophy Award, honoring the best player in college soccer.

During his college years Bunbury also played with the Rochester Thunder in the USL Premier Development League and the Chicago Fire Premier in the USL Super-20 League.

=== Professional ===
After two years with the Zips, Bunbury decided to forgo the remainder of his collegiate career and signed with Generation adidas. He was drafted in the first round (4th overall) of the 2010 MLS SuperDraft by Kansas City Wizards.

He made his professional debut on March 27 in Kansas City's opening game of the 2010 MLS season against D.C. United, and scored his first professional goal on April 13 in a Lamar Hunt U.S. Open Cup game against the Colorado Rapids. He was handed a start on his first game in Canada versus Toronto FC and was subbed off in the 58th minute. He scored his first MLS goal in a 1–0 victory over Columbus Crew on July 14.

In December 2010, Bunbury joined English Premier League side Stoke City on trial and scored in a reserve match against Wigan Athletic.

In August 2012, he suffered a torn ACL during a match against New York Red Bulls, which kept him off the field for 10 months.

==== New England Revolution ====
On February 19, 2014, Bunbury was traded to the New England Revolution for a first round 2015 MLS SuperDraft pick and allocation money. Bunbury made his league debut for New England, and his first start for New England, on March 8 in a 4-0 defeat to the Houston Dynamo. He made his home debut on March 22 in a 0-0 draw against the Vancouver Whitecaps. He scored his first Revolution goal on April 26 in a 2-0 win over Sporting Kansas City. Bunbury finished the regular season as the team's leader in assists, with 6, adding 4 goals.

Bunbury became a major contributor to New England's run to the 2014 MLS Cup Final, scoring from long distance in the Eastern Conference final against Red Bull New York. New England fell to LA Galaxy 2–1 final after extra time, with Bunbury's potential game-winning shot bouncing off the crossbar in the 85th minute.

Bunbury helped lead the Revs to the 2016 U.S. Open Cup Final, scoring twice against the New York Cosmos in the Round of 16 and adding the third goal in a 3–1 victory over the Chicago Fire in the semifinals. Bunbury assisted on Juan Agudelo's second goal in the final, but the Revs eventually fell to FC Dallas 4–2.

In 2017, Bunbury was named Revolution Player's Player of the Year.

In 2018, Bunbury tallied 11 goals for the Revs, reaching double-digit league goals in one season for the first time in his career. He additionally led the team in game-winning goals, with five.

Bunbury was New England's leading scorer during the pandemic-shortened 2020 MLS Season. He was also named the club's Humanitarian of the Year. He was again named Humanitarian of the Year in 2021.

On December 12, 2021, Bunbury was traded to Nashville SC for up to $150,000 in allocation money. He concluded his Revolution career 7th in games played for the club, with 231, His 45 Revolution goals are the 4th-most a player has ever scored for the club.

== International career ==
Bunbury played for the Canadian national U-17 and U-20 teams. Though he had said he would play for Canada and it would feel "wrong" to play for the US, he was called up to the full US team as part of the squad to face South Africa. Bunbury earned his first cap for the United States on November 17, 2010, coming on as a substitute at halftime in the Nelson Mandela Challenge Cup. He scored his first international goal against Chile from a penalty kick, in an exhibition match in Los Angeles.

== Personal life ==
Bunbury is the son of Alex Bunbury, a former striker who is the joint eighth-highest scorer all-time for the Canadian men's soccer team. He also finished his career as one of C.S. Marítimo's all-time top goal scorers. Bunbury is the first son of a former MLS player to be drafted into the league.

In 2015, he married Kaity Maurer, with whom he has two daughters.

== Career statistics ==
As of match played October 2, 2025

Appearances and goals by club, season and competition
| Club | Season | League | | | National cup | | Continental | | Other | | Total | |
| Club | Season | Division | Apps | Goals | Apps | Goals | Apps | Goals | Apps | Goals | Apps | Goals |
|---|---|---|---|---|---|---|---|---|---|---|---|---|
| Sporting Kansas City | 2010 | Major League Soccer | 26 | 5 | 0 | 0 | — | | — | | 26 | 5 |
| Sporting Kansas City | 2011 | Major League Soccer | 29 | 9 | 2 | 1 | — | | 3 (Note: Appearance(s) in MLS Cup Playoffs) | 2 | 34 | 12 |
| Sporting Kansas City | 2012 | Major League Soccer | 22 | 5 | 4 | 1 | — | | 0 | 0 | 26 | 6 |
| Sporting Kansas City | 2013 | Major League Soccer | 12 | 0 | 1 | 0 | 2 (Note: Appearances in CONCACAF Champions League) | 0 | 2 | 0 | 17 | 0 |
| Sporting Kansas City | Total | | 89 | 19 | 7 | 2 | 2 | 0 | 5 | 2 | 103 | 23 |
| New England Revolution | 2014 | Major League Soccer | 31 | 4 | 1 | 0 | — | | 5 | 2 | 37 | 6 |
| New England Revolution | 2015 | Major League Soccer | 30 | 4 | 0 | 0 | — | | 1 | 0 | 31 | 4 |
| New England Revolution | 2016 | Major League Soccer | 27 | 2 | 3 | 3 | — | | — | | 30 | 5 |
| New England Revolution | 2017 | Major League Soccer | 28 | 7 | 3 | 1 | — | | — | | 31 | 8 |
| New England Revolution | 2018 | Major League Soccer | 32 | 11 | 0 | 0 | — | | — | | 32 | 11 |
| New England Revolution | 2019 | Major League Soccer | 32 | 6 | 2 | 2 | — | | 1 | 0 | 35 | 8 |
| New England Revolution | 2020 | Major League Soccer | 23 | 8 | — | | — | | 4 | 0 | 27 | 8 |
| New England Revolution | 2021 | Major League Soccer | 29 | 3 | — | | — | | 1 | 0 | 30 | 3 |
| New England Revolution | Total | | 232 | 45 | 9 | 6 | — | | 12 | 2 | 253 | 53 |
| Nashville SC | 2022 | Major League Soccer | 17 | 5 | 0 | 0 | — | | 2 (Note: One appearance in Leagues Cup, one appearance in MLS Cup Playoffs) | 0 | 19 | 5 |
| Nashville SC | 2023 | Major League Soccer | 31 | 3 | 1 | 0 | — | | 7 (Note: Five appearances and one goal in Leagues Cup, two appearances in MLS Cup Playoffs) | 1 | 39 | 4 |
| Nashville SC | 2024 | Major League Soccer | 27 | 3 | — | | 2 (Note: Appearances in CONCACAF Champions Cup) | 0 | 2 (Note: Appearances in Leagues Cup) | 0 | 31 | 3 |
| Nashville SC | Total | | 75 | 11 | 1 | 0 | 2 | 0 | 11 | 1 | 89 | 12 |
| Career totals | | | 396 | 75 | 17 | 8 | 4 | 0 | 28 | 4 | 445 | 88 |

=== International ===
As of match played January 25, 2012

Appearances and goals by national team and year
| National team | Year | Apps | Goals |
|---|---|---|---|
| United States | 2010 | 1 | 0 |
| United States | 2011 | 1 | 1 |
| United States | 2012 | 2 | 0 |
| Total | | 4 | 1 |

As of goal scored on 22 january 2011

List of international goals scored by Bunbury
| No. | Date | Venue | Opponent | Score | Result | Competition | Ref. |
|---|---|---|---|---|---|---|---|
| 1 | 22 January 2011 | Dignity Health Sports Park, Carson, California, U.S. | Chile | 1–1 | 1–1 | Friendly | |

== Honors ==
New England Revolution

- Supporters' Shield: 2021

Nashville SC

- U.S. Open Cup: 2025

Individual

- Mid-American Conference Player of the Year: 2009
- Goal.com Player of the Year: 2009
- Hermann Trophy Winner: 2010
- NSCAA All-American: 2009
- Soccer America Player of the Year: 2009
- New England Revolution Golden Boot Winner: 2020
- New England Revolution Humanitarian of the Year: 2020
