= Hexagonal (CONCACAF) =

Final round of FIFA World Cup qualifying

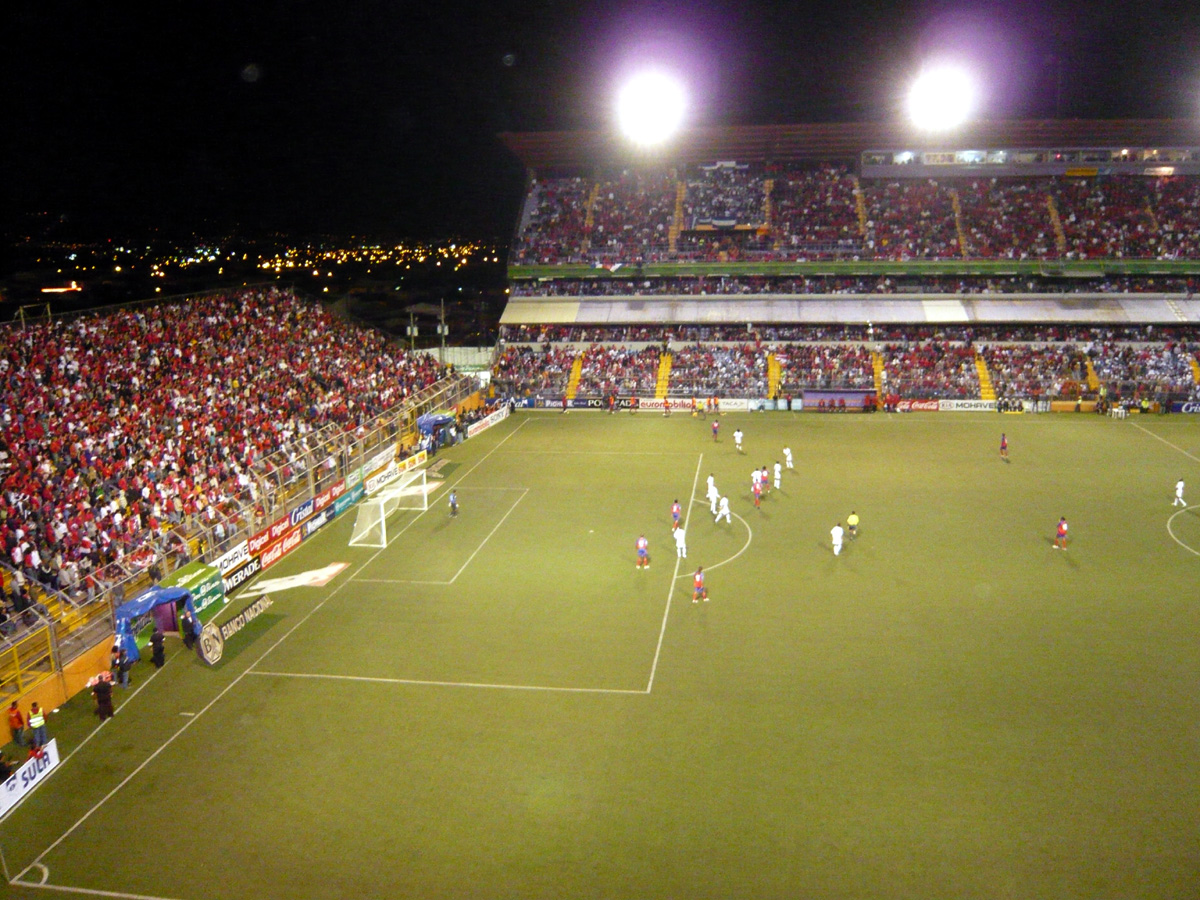
Costa Rica facing Honduras during the first matchday of the Hexagonal for the 2010 FIFA World Cup qualification

In association football, the term Hexagonal (known in English as The Hex) was often used to refer to the final round of FIFA World Cup qualification among the six remaining teams in CONCACAF. The six-team round robin format was used by CONCACAF since the 1998 FIFA World Cup qualification process, up until the 2018 tournament. For 2022, this round was expanded to eight teams or an octagonal. It was modeled after the CONCACAF Championship which used the format ever since its second edition in 1965, and served as the World Cup qualifying tournament from 1974 to 1990.

The United States, Mexico, and Costa Rica were present in every Hexagonal. Mexico was the only national team that qualified for the FIFA World Cup in every Hexagonal.

The Hexagonal, or Hex for short, was named for the hexagon (a six sided shape) due to there being six teams remaining in the tournament at the time.

== United States vs. Mexico rivalry ==
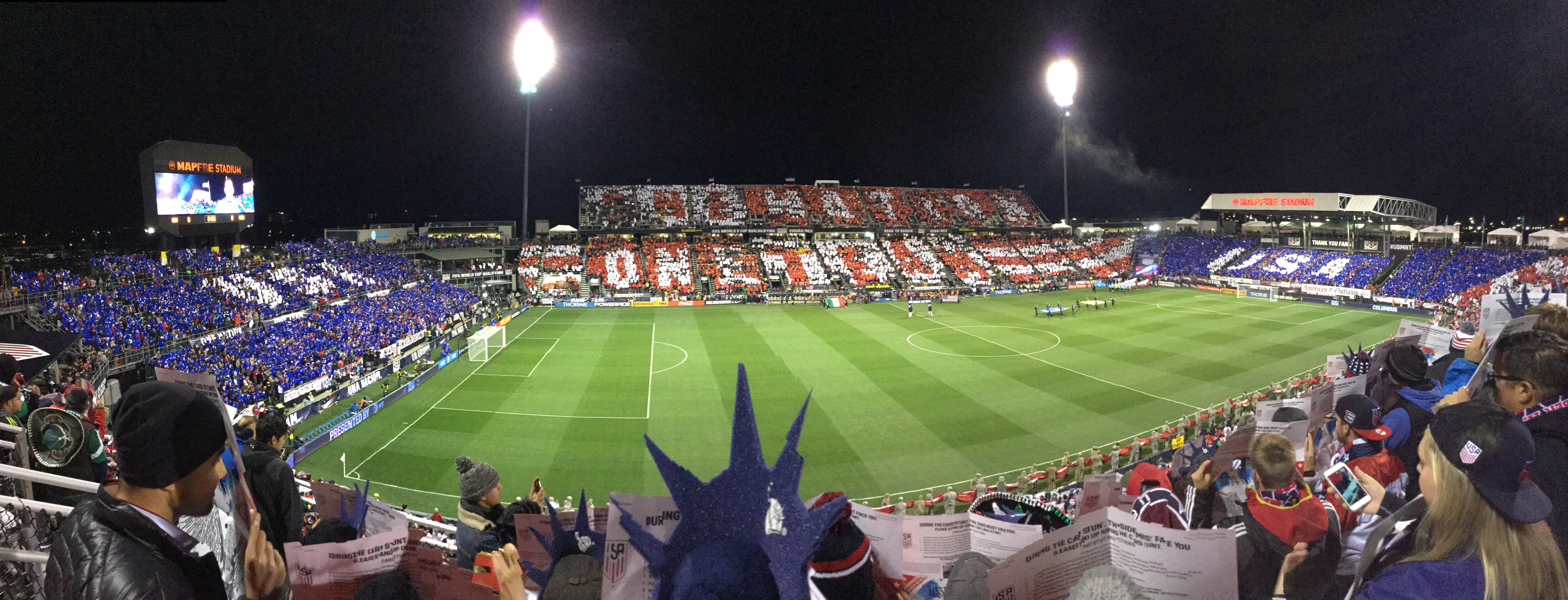
The Columbus Crew Stadium before the 11 November 2016 match between Mexico and the United States, which saw the Mexicans end the Dos a Cero streak

The United States and Mexico were the most successful teams in the Hexagonal, with Mexico qualifying for every World Cup since 1994. Indeed, the Mexico–United States soccer rivalry has been hotly contested during the Hexagonal. Matches between the two opponents hosted by Mexico often sell out the 100,000 seat Estadio Azteca in Mexico City; matches hosted in the United States are often held in cold northern cities such as Columbus, Ohio.

Episodes of this rivalry during Hexagonal matchdays include the Dos a Cero, a streak of four consecutive 2–0 victories for the United States at the Columbus Crew Stadium between 2001 and 2013. The streak ended on November 11, 2016 as the Mexicans defeated the Americans 1–2.

Another noteworthy event occurred on 15 October 2013, the final matchday of the Hexagonal on the road to the 2014 FIFA World Cup. The Mexicans were facing elimination from the World Cup as they were losing against Costa Rica in San José and Panama were defeating the Americans, both matches by 2–1. However, during stoppage time, Graham Zusi and Aron Jóhannsson scored for the United States, resulting in an American victory by 3–2, which helped Mexico qualify to the intercontinental play-off series against New Zealand. The United States national team Twitter account tweeted #YoureWelcomeMexico and tagged their Mexican counterparts' profile. Because of the significance of his goal, Zusi received recognition from some Mexican fans as "a saint". Zusi also revealed that Mexican player Marco Fabián thanked him for the goal.

== 1998 ==
The first hexagonal round was played in 1997, between 2 March and 16 November. Mexico topped the round robin undefeated, being the only team to do so. Jamaica qualified to their first (and so far, only) FIFA World Cup. It was Canada's only participation in the hexagonal round, and their last appearance at the final stage of a FIFA World Cup qualification until 2022, in which they qualified for the tournament after 36 years.

Pos	Team	Pld	W	D	L	GF	GA	GD	Pts	Qualification	Mexico	United States	Jamaica	Costa Rica	El Salvador	Canada
1	Mexico	10	4	6	0	23	7	+16	18	Qualification to 1998 FIFA World Cup	—	0–0	6–0	3–3	5–0	4–0
2	United States	10	4	5	1	17	9	+8	17	Qualification to 1998 FIFA World Cup	2–2	—	1–1	1–0	4–2	3–0
3	Jamaica	10	3	5	2	7	12	−5	14	Qualification to 1998 FIFA World Cup	0–0	0–0	—	1–0	1–0	1–0
4	Costa Rica	10	3	3	4	13	12	+1	12		0–0	3–2	3–1	—	0–0	3–1
5	El Salvador	10	2	4	4	11	16	−5	10		0–1	1–1	2–2	2–1	—	4–1
6	Canada	10	1	3	6	5	20	−15	6		2–2	0–3	0–0	1–0	0–0	—

Source: FIFA
Rules for classification: Qualification tiebreakers

== 2002 ==
The second edition of The Hex was played in 2001, between 28 February and 11 November. It was topped by Costa Rica, who totaled a record 23 points. The Costa Ricans marked the first defeat Mexico ever had at a World Cup qualification match at home soil, in a match known as El Aztecazo.

Pos	Team	Pld	W	D	L	GF	GA	GD	Pts	Qualification	Costa Rica	Mexico	United States	Honduras	Jamaica	Trinidad and Tobago
1	Costa Rica	10	7	2	1	17	7	+10	23	Qualified to the 2002 FIFA World Cup	—	0–0	2–0	2–2	2–1	3–0
2	Mexico	10	5	2	3	16	9	+7	17	Qualified to the 2002 FIFA World Cup	1–2	—	1–0	3–0	4–0	3–0
3	United States	10	5	2	3	11	8	+3	17	Qualified to the 2002 FIFA World Cup	1–0	2–0	—	2–3	2–1	2–0
4	Honduras	10	4	2	4	17	17	0	14		2–3	3–1	1–2	—	1–0	0–1
5	Jamaica	10	2	2	6	7	14	−7	8		0–1	1–2	0–0	1–1	—	1–0
6	Trinidad and Tobago	10	1	2	7	5	18	−13	5		0–2	1–1	0–0	2–4	1–2	—

Source: FIFA

== 2006 ==
Pos	Team	Pld	W	D	L	GF	GA	GD	Pts	Qualification	(United States)	(Mexico)	(Costa Rica)	(Trinidad and Tobago)	(Guatemala)	(Panama)
1	United States	10	7	1	2	16	6	+10	22 (Note: Tied on head-to-head points (3). Head-to-head goal difference: United States +1, Mexico −1.)	2006 FIFA World Cup	—	2–0	3–0	1–0	2–0	2–0
2	Mexico	10	7	1	2	22	9	+13	22	2006 FIFA World Cup	2–1	—	2–0	2–0	5–2	5–0
3	Costa Rica	10	5	1	4	15	14	+1	16	2006 FIFA World Cup	3–0	1–2	—	2–0	3–2	2–1
4	Trinidad and Tobago	10	4	1	5	10	15	−5	13	Inter-confederation play-offs	1–2	2–1	0–0	—	3–2	2–0
5	Guatemala	10	3	2	5	16	18	−2	11		0–0	0–2	3–1	5–1	—	2–1
6	Panama	10	0	2	8	4	21	−17	2		0–3	1–1	1–3	0–1	0–0	—

Notes:
- United States finished ahead of Mexico based on results between tied teams which were the first tiebreaker.
- Mexico, United States and Costa Rica directly advanced to the 2006 FIFA World Cup.
- Trinidad and Tobago advanced to the AFC-CONCACAF play-off, where they would defeat Bahrain 2–1 on aggregate to advance to the World Cup.

== 2010 ==
The six teams that reached the fourth round formed one double-round-robin, home-and-away group nicknamed the "Hexagonal." The top three teams qualified for the 2010 FIFA World Cup. The fourth place team qualified for a home-and-away play-off against the fifth-place team from CONMEBOL.

Pos	Team	Pld	W	D	L	GF	GA	GD	Pts	Qualification	(United States)	(Mexico)	(Honduras)	(Costa Rica)	(El Salvador)	(Trinidad and Tobago)
1	United States	10	6	2	2	19	13	+6	20	Qualification to 2010 FIFA World Cup	—	2–0	2–1	2–2	2–1	3–0
2	Mexico	10	6	1	3	18	12	+6	19	Qualification to 2010 FIFA World Cup	2–1	—	1–0	2–0	4–1	2–1
3	Honduras	10	5	1	4	17	11	+6	16	Qualification to 2010 FIFA World Cup	2–3	3–1	—	4–0	1–0	4–1
4	Costa Rica	10	5	1	4	15	15	0	16	Advance to inter-confederation play-offs	3–1	0–3	2–0	—	1–0	4–0
5	El Salvador	10	2	2	6	9	15	−6	8		2–2	2–1	0–1	1–0	—	2–2
6	Trinidad and Tobago	10	1	3	6	10	22	−12	6		0–1	2–2	1–1	2–3	1–0	—

== 2014 ==
In the fourth round, the three group winners and three runners-up from the third round competed in a double round robin, including a home and away match against the other five teams between 6 February and 15 October 2013. The draw for 'The Hex' was conducted by FIFA on 7 November 2012.

The top three teams qualified directly for the 2014 FIFA World Cup finals, while the fourth-placed team advanced to a home-away series against the winner of Oceania, which ended up being New Zealand. Teams are ranked first by total points in all games, then, if tied, by best goal differential in all games, then by total goals in all games. If still tied, the same criteria are applied to games among the tied teams (including head-to-head away goals scored).

Pos	Team	Pld	W	D	L	GF	GA	GD	Pts	Qualification	United States	Costa Rica	Honduras	Mexico	Panama	Jamaica
1	United States	10	7	1	2	15	8	+7	22	Qualification to 2014 FIFA World Cup	—	1–0	1–0	2–0	2–0	2–0
2	Costa Rica	10	5	3	2	13	7	+6	18	Qualification to 2014 FIFA World Cup	3–1	—	1–0	2–1	2–0	2–0
3	Honduras	10	4	3	3	13	12	+1	15	Qualification to 2014 FIFA World Cup	2–1	1–0	—	2–2	2–2	2–0
4	Mexico	10	2	5	3	7	9	−2	11	Advance to inter-confederation play-offs	0–0	0–0	1–2	—	2–1	0–0
5	Panama	10	1	5	4	10	14	−4	8		2–3	2–2	2–0	0–0	—	0–0
6	Jamaica	10	0	5	5	5	13	−8	5		1–2	1–1	2–2	0–1	1–1	—

== 2018 ==
Pos	Team	Pld	W	D	L	GF	GA	GD	Pts	Qualification	(Mexico)	(Costa Rica)	(Panama)	(Honduras)	(United States)	(Trinidad and Tobago)
1	Mexico	10	6	3	1	16	7	+9	21	Qualification to 2018 FIFA World Cup	—	2–0	1–0	3–0	1–1	3–1
2	Costa Rica	10	4	4	2	14	8	+6	16	Qualification to 2018 FIFA World Cup	1–1	—	0–0	1–1	4–0	2–1
3	Panama	10	3	4	3	9	10	−1	13	Qualification to 2018 FIFA World Cup	0–0	2–1	—	2–2	1–1	3–0
4	Honduras	10	3	4	3	13	19	−6	13	Advance to inter-confederation play-offs	3–2	1–1	0–1	—	1–1	3–1
5	United States	10	3	3	4	17	13	+4	12		1–2	0–2	4–0	6–0	—	2–0
6	Trinidad and Tobago	10	2	0	8	7	19	−12	6		0–1	0–2	1–0	1–2	2–1	—

Source: FIFA
Rules for classification: Qualification tiebreakers
- Mexico, Costa Rica and Panama qualified directly for the 2018 FIFA World Cup.
- Honduras advanced to the CONCACAF–AFC playoff; they would be defeated by Australia 3–1 on aggregate.
- The United States failed to qualify for the World Cup for the first time since the Hexagonal was introduced; they had qualified for every World Cup between 1990 and 2014.

== Replacement and future ==
The Hexagonal was initially the top-seeded round in the CONCACAF qualifiers for the 2022 World Cup, but, following FIFA's decision on 25 June 2020 to postpone the September international window due to the COVID-19 pandemic (except UEFA), CONCACAF noted that "The challenges presented by postponements to the football calendar, and the incomplete FIFA rankings cycle in our confederation, means our current World Cup qualifying process has been compromised and will be changed." The confederation eventually announced on 27 July its new qualifying format for the World Cup, replacing the Hexagonal with an eight-team final round, dubbed the Octagonal. FIFA subsequently announced that a January–February window will be used for all confederations except UEFA.

For the 2026 FIFA World Cup, Canada, the United States, and Mexico automatically qualified as co-hosts, so they would not participate in qualifiers for the final tournament, which would be expanded to 48 teams. The number of places allocated to CONCACAF for the 2026 tournament has been increased from three and a half to six including the hosts, meaning three non-hosting CONCACAF teams would earn their berths in the final tournament from the CONCACAF qualifiers, along with two intercontinental play-off berths (one for each confederation except UEFA and one additional berth as CONCACAF is the host confederation).

== Records ==
=== Ranking of teams ===
#	Team	Hexagonals						Times qualified	Total apps
#	Team	1998	2002	2006	2010	2014	2018	Times qualified	Total apps
1	Mexico	1	2	2	2	4	1	6	6
2	United States	2	3	1	1	1	5	5	6
3	Costa Rica	4	1	3	4	2	2	4	6
4	Honduras	―	4	―	3	3	4	2	4
5	Jamaica	3	5	―	―	6	―	1	3
6	Panama	―	―	6	―	5	3	1	3
7	Trinidad and Tobago	―	6	4	6	―	6	1	4
8	El Salvador	5	―	―	5	―	―	0	2
9	Guatemala	―	―	5	―	―	―	0	1
10	Canada	6	―	―	―	―	―	0	1

Notes

Team finished as leaders and qualified to the FIFA World Cup
Team finished as second or third place and qualified to the FIFA World Cup
Team finished as fourth place and qualified to the FIFA World Cup after winning an intercontinental play-off
Team finished as fourth place and failed to qualify for the FIFA World Cup after losing an intercontinental play-off
Team finished as fourth place and did not qualify to the FIFA World Cup, as there was no intercontinental play-off slot for the tournament

=== All-time table ===
3 points per win, 1 point per draw and 0 points per loss.

Team	Totals								Home								Away							
Team	Pld	W	D	L	GF	GA	GD	Pts	Pld	W	D	L	GF	GA	GD	Pts	Pld	W	D	L	GF	GA	GD	Pts
United States	60	32	14	14	95	57	+38	110	30	24	3	3	61	18	43	75	30	8	11	11	34	39	−5	35
Mexico	60	30	18	12	102	53	+49	108	30	22	6	2	70	16	54	72	30	8	12	10	32	37	−5	36
Costa Rica	60	29	14	17	87	63	+24	101	30	21	7	2	57	21	36	70	30	8	7	15	30	42	−12	31
Honduras	40	16	10	14	60	59	+1	58	20	11	4	5	38	22	16	37	20	5	6	9	22	37	−15	21
Trinidad and Tobago	40	8	6	26	32	74	–42	30	20	6	5	9	22	27	−5	23	20	2	1	17	10	47	−37	7
Jamaica	30	5	12	13	19	39	–20	27	15	4	7	4	11	11	0	19	15	1	5	9	8	28	−20	8
Panama	30	4	11	15	23	45	–22	23	15	4	7	4	16	17	−1	19	15	0	4	11	7	28	−21	4
El Salvador	20	4	6	10	20	31	–11	18	10	4	4	2	16	12	4	16	10	0	2	8	4	19	−15	2
Guatemala	10	3	2	5	16	18	–2	11	5	3	1	1	10	5	5	10	5	0	1	4	6	13	−7	1
Canada	10	1	3	6	5	20	–15	6	5	1	3	1	3	5	−2	6	5	0	0	5	2	15	−13	0

=== Team ===
- Most appearances: Costa Rica, Mexico and United States: 6.
- Most times qualified to FIFA World Cup: Mexico: 6.
- Winners:
  - United States: 3 (2006, 2010, 2014).
  - Mexico: 2 (1998, 2018).
  - Costa Rica: 1 (2002).
- Most points: United States, 110.
  - Most points home: United States, 75.
  - Most points away: Mexico, 36.
- Most won matches: United States, 32.
  - Most won matches home: United States, 24.
  - Most won matches away: Costa Rica, Mexico and United States, 8.
- Most drawn matches: Mexico, 18.
  - Most drawn matches home: Costa Rica, Jamaica and Panama, 7.
  - Most drawn matches away: Mexico, 12.
- Most lost matches: Trinidad and Tobago, 26.
  - Most lost matches home: Trinidad and Tobago, 9.
  - Most lost matches away: Trinidad and Tobago, 17.
- Most goals scored: Mexico, 100.
  - Most goals scored home: Mexico, 70.
  - Most goals scored away: United States, 33.
- Most won matches in a tournament: Costa Rica (7 in 2002), Mexico (7 in 2006) and United States (7 in 2006, 2014).
- Fewest won matches in a tournament: Panama (0 in 2006) and Jamaica (0 in 2014).
- Most drawn matches in a tournament: Mexico, 6 (1998).
- Fewest drawn matches in a tournament: Trinidad and Tobago, 0 (2018).
- Most lost matches in a tournament: Panama, 8 (2006).
- Fewest lost matches in a tournament: Mexico, 0 (1998).
- Most points in a tournament: Costa Rica, 23 (2002).
- Fewest points in a tournament: Panama, 2 (2006).
- Most goals scored in a tournament: Mexico, 23 (1998).
- Fewest goals scored in a tournament: Panama, 4 (2006).
- Most goals covered in a tournament: Trinidad and Tobago, 22 (2010).
- Fewest goals covered in a tournament: United States, 6 (2006).
- Best goal difference in a tournament: Mexico, +16 (1998).
- Worst goal difference in a tournament: Panama, -17 (2006).
- Best result: Mexico 6–0 Jamaica (1998) and United States 6–0 Honduras (2018).
  - Best result home: Mexico 6–0 Jamaica (1998) and United States 6–0 Honduras (2018).
  - Best result away: Canada 0–3 United States (1998), Panama 0–3 United States (2006) and Costa Rica 0–3 Mexico (2010).

=== Individual ===
- Top scorer: (Honduras) Carlos Pavon, 12.
- Top scorer in a tournament: (Mexico) Carlos Hermosillo, 8 (1998).
- Hattricks and pokers:

# goals	Player	Match	Qualification
4	(Mexico) Francisco Fonseca	Mexico 5–2 Guatemala	2006
3	(Mexico) Carlos Hermosillo	Mexico 6–0 Jamaica	1998
3	(Honduras) Carlos Pavon	Honduras 3–1 Mexico	2002
3	(United States) Jozy Altidore	United States 3–0 Trinidad and Tobago	2010
3	(United States) Clint Dempsey	United States 6–0 Honduras	2018

=== Top goalscorers ===
Rank	Player	Goals scored	Matches played	Goals per game	Qualifications
1	(Honduras) Carlos Pavón	12	17	0.71	2002, 2010
2	(United States) Jozy Altidore	11	29	0.38	2010, 2014, 2018
3	(Costa Rica) Paulo Wanchope	10	20	0.50	1998, 2002, 2006
4	(Honduras) Carlo Costly	9	17	0.53	2010, 2014
4	(Trinidad and Tobago) Stern John	9	23	0.40	2002, 2006, 2010
6	(Mexico) Carlos Hermosillo	8	10	0.80	1998
6	(Mexico) Cuauhtémoc Blanco	8	19	0.42	1998, 2002, 2006, 2010
6	(Costa Rica) Álvaro Saborío	8	21	0.38	2006, 2010, 2014
6	(United States) Clint Dempsey	8	28	0.29	2006, 2010, 2014, 2018
10	(Mexico) Jared Borgetti	7	14	0.50	2002, 2006
10	(United States) Landon Donovan	7	26	0.27	2002, 2006, 2010, 2014
12	(Mexico) Francisco Fonseca	6	9	0.66	2006
12	(Costa Rica) Bryan Ruiz	6	27	0.22	2010, 2014, 2018
14	(Mexico) Benjamín Galindo	5	8	0.62	1998
14	(Costa Rica) Rolando Fonseca	5	16	0.31	1998, 2002, 2006
14	(United States) Michael Bradley	5	24	0.21	2010, 2014, 2018
14	(Costa Rica) Celso Borges	5	26	0.20	2010, 2014, 2018
14	(United States) Christian Pulisic	5	10	0.50	2018

=== Top goalscorers by tournament ===
Qualification	Top scorer(s)	Goals
(France) 1998	(Mexico) Carlos Hermosillo	8
(South Korea) (Japan) 2002	(Mexico) Cuauhtémoc Blanco (Costa Rica) Rolando Fonseca (Honduras) Carlos Pavón	5
(Germany) 2006	(Mexico) Francisco Fonseca	6
(South Africa) 2010	(Honduras) Carlos Pavón	7
(Brazil) 2014	(Honduras) Carlo Costly (Honduras) Jerry Bengtson (United States) Jozy Altidore	4
(Russia) 2018	(United States) Christian Pulisic	5
