= Paul James (soccer) =

Canadian soccer player (born 1963)

Personal information
- Full name: Paul John James
- Date of birth: November 11, 1963 (age 63)
- Place of birth: Cardiff, Wales
- Height: 5 ft 10 in (1.78 m)
- Position: Midfielder

Youth career
- Wilfrid Laurier Golden Hawks

Senior career*
Years	Team	Apps	(Gls)
1983–1984	Toronto Blizzard	21	(1)
1986	Toronto Blizzard		
1987–1988	Hamilton Steelers	46	(4)
1988	Doncaster Rovers	8	(0)
1989	Ottawa Intrepid	24	(0)
1990	Hamilton Steelers	6	(0)
1991	Toronto Blizzard	27	(1)
1992	London Lasers	20	(0)

International career
1983–1993	Canada	46	(2)

Managerial career
- 1989: Ottawa Intrepid
- 1992: London Lasers
- 1994: Le Moyne Dolphins
- 1996–1997: Niagara Purple Eagles (men and women)
- 1998–2001: Canada U20
- 2004–2010: York Lions
Medal record
Representing Canada
Men's Association football
CONCACAF Championship
Winner	1985 North America
- * Club domestic league appearances and goals

Paul John James (born November 11, 1963) is a retired professional soccer player who played as a midfielder. He was a one-time CONCACAF champion who represented Canada at both the Los Angeles 1984 Olympic Games and 1986 FIFA World Cup in Mexico. He later worked as a soccer analyst and soccer coach. He is an honoured member of the Canada Soccer Hall of Fame.

In 1998, James was granted his Canada Soccer Coaching "A" Licence. After working as a player-coach in the Canadian Soccer League, he later served as a coach with Canada's national youth teams from 1998 to 2001, including the FIFA U-20 World Cup in 2001. A graduate of Wilfrid Laurier University, James has added to his academic credentials by completing the prestigious Football Industries MBA (FIMBA) at the University of Liverpool in England.

In February 2012, Paul revealed he had suffered from a crack cocaine dependency for many years. Paul was on a hunger strike to protest his mistreatment by York University over his "Substance Disability".

== Early years ==
James lived in Cardiff until July 3, 1980 when at 16 years of age he emigrated to Toronto, Canada, with his parents and sister Julie.

Departed Wales with a Canadian equivalent Grade 12 education and an athletic career which included being awarded Whitchurch High School's Athlete of the Year in 1980; two time Glamorgan champion at 800 metres with the fastest recorded times in Wales in 1977/78 for his age group; a third-place finish at the British Championships in the 1500 metres; excelled in soccer which included competing for Cardiff Schoolboys, county of Glamorgan, Cardiff City Youth Team, and Newport County Reserves as a 15 year old; while also competing in first team high school rugby and cricket.

From 1980 to 1982, James played for the Oakville Minor Soccer club winning an Ontario provincial championship. In 1982, Paul John James played for the Ontario Provincial team who won the Canadian national championships.

== Club career ==
James developed into a top class midfield player while with the Toronto Blizzard. On the Blizzard team, James scored against the then famed New York Cosmos. He played in the North American Soccer League and Canadian Soccer League, where he earned first team all-star honours on four consecutive occasions. In 1986, he played in the National Soccer League with Toronto Blizzard. He also had a short stint with English league outfit Doncaster Rovers.

== International career ==
Welsh-born James became a Canadian citizen in 1983 and arrived on the international scene when he made full appearances for Canada at the 1984 Olympics in Los Angeles. He made his senior debut for Canada in a December 1983 friendly match against Mexico in Irapuato, James played in all four of Canada's games at Los Angeles Olympics including quarter final game against Brazil losing on penalty kicks

He made 46 international "A" appearances for Canada (two goals) as well as additional "B" appearances including the Olympic Games.

James scored a crucial equalizer for Canada against Costa Rica in Toronto in 1985 that would help Canada qualify for the 1986 FIFA World Cup finals in Mexico. He also played for Canada in the penultimate game in the 1985 CONCACAF Championship that would secure the national team the continental title along with the lone North American spot in the 1986 FIFA World Cup. A member of the country's 1986 World Cup team, he played in all three games in the group stage of the finals. He represented Canada in 7 World Cup qualifiers.

James' last two games for Canada were a pair of friendlies in March 1993, a 2-2 draw against the United States in Los Angeles, and his final international match, a 2-0 loss against South Korea in Coquitlam, British Columbia.

=== International goals ===
Scores and results list Canada's goal tally first.

#	Date	Venue	Opponent	Score	Result	Competition
1	October 24, 1984	Stade Moulay Abdellah, Rabat, Morocco	Morocco		2–3	Friendly match
2	August 17, 1985	Varsity Stadium, Toronto, Canada	Costa Rica	1–1	1–1	1986 FIFA World Cup qualification

== Coaching career ==
After serving as player/coach at Ottawa and London, James also coached at LeMoyne College in Syracuse, New York, leading them to within one game of an NCAA berth and an NCAA Division II national ranking as high as 12th, Niagara University and Canada men's national under-20 soccer team. As head coach of the Under-20 team, he led them to the 2001 FIFA World Youth Championship in Argentina. James thus became the first Canadian to represent Canada at a FIFA World Championships both as a player and coach.

Through his coaching career, Paul has garnered six coach of the year awards at varying levels including; CSL, NCAA, and OUA. In 2007, James received the CIS (Canadian Interuniversity Sport) national coach of the year award. James has a reputation for developing successful soccer programs. In 2008, James coached York to the CIS Canadian Championship game where they won the title. On January 16, 2010, James announced his departure from York University after serving with the Lions for six years.

== Soccer analyst ==
From 2004 to 2008, James was an analyst for The Footy Show on The Score television network, along with James Sharman and the late Brian Budd. He also provided soccer analysis for GolTV in Canada until April 2009. Paul has appeared on the CBC and Sportsnet on numerous occasions and has written for The Globe and Mail. James was also a frequent podcast contributor to RedNation Online.

== Author, advocacy for human rights protection ==
Authored Crack Open (2012); Owner Author Confronting the Stigma of Drug Addiction; Submissions to HRTO, Divisional Court of Appeal; Ontario Court of Appeal and Supreme Court of Canada (2012–2019).

== Honours ==
Canada

- CONCACAF Championship: 1985
