= George Pakos =

Canadian soccer player (born 1952)

Personal information
- Date of birth: July 14, 1952 (age 74)
- Place of birth: Victoria, British Columbia, Canada
- Height: 1.78 m (5 ft 10 in)
- Position: Second striker

Senior career*
Years	Team	Apps	(Gls)
- Victoria West United
- London Boxing Club of Victoria
- Victoria Riptide
1989	Victoria Vistas	18	(1)

International career
1983–1986	Canada	23	(5)
Medal record
Representing Canada
Men's Association football
CONCACAF Championship
Winner	1985 North America
- * Club domestic league appearances and goals

George "Teddy" Pakos (born August 14, 1952) is a Canadian former soccer player who played as a second striker. His goals were crucial in the Canada national team qualifying for the 1986 FIFA World Cup.

== Club career ==
Pakos won Rookie of the Year honours in the final Pacific Coast League season, helping Victoria West United finish second overall in the 1972-73 league standings. He later played for Victoria's London Boxing Club (which later became the VAA) and won Canada Soccer's The Challenge Trophy in 1975. He began work at the same time as a water-meter technician for the city of Victoria, a job he continued for over 25 years. The third son of Polish immigrants, George's father Zenon played professionally in Poland before being displaced by the war. Pakos did play briefly professionally in the Western Soccer Alliance in 1985 with the Victoria Riptides and in the Canadian Soccer League with the Victoria Vistas in 1989.

== International career ==
Spotted by coach Bob Bearpark while playing for the Vancouver Island Selects amateur team, Pakos made his debut with the Olympic team at age 30. He also played for Bearpark in two Olympic qualifying matches in 1983 against Bermuda, scoring once in each game. He was however left off the team that reached the quarterfinals of the Olympics.

The midfielder Pakos scored five times in 23 'A' internationals, all of which he earned from age 31 on. In 1986 FIFA World Cup qualification as a 33-year-old who had been cut from the team after the first round of qualifying, Pakos was recalled and scored the lone goal in a vital away win at Honduras. He also scored the first goal in a 2–1 home victory against Honduras that clinched Canada's berth in their only finals appearance. Pakos came on for the last 21 minutes of Canada's third match in the finals versus the Soviet Union in his final full international appearance.

== Post-retirement ==
Pakos was head coach of V.A.A.'s Division 2 men's team of the Vancouver Island Soccer League in 2005–06.

In 2001, Pakos was inducted into the Greater Victoria Sports Hall of Fame.

== Career statistics ==
Scores and results list Canada's goal tally first.

#	Date	Venue	Opponent	Score	Result	Competition
1	11 December 1983	Estadio General Francisco Morazán (San Pedro Sula, Honduras)	Honduras		1–3	Friendly match
2	4 April 1985	Civic Stadium (Portland, Oregon)	United States		1–1	Friendly match
3	25 August 1985	Estadio Tiburcio Carías Andino (Tegucigalpa, Honduras)	Honduras	1–0	1–0	1986 FIFA World Cup qualification
4	14 September 1985	King George V Park (St. John's, Newfoundland)	Honduras	1–0	2–1	1986 FIFA World Cup qualification
5	2 February 1986	Orange Bowl (Miami, Florida)	Uruguay	1–1	1–3	Miami Cup

== Honours ==
=== Player ===
Victoria London Boxing Club

- Canadian Amateur Championship (Challenge Trophy) winner (1975)

Canada

- CONCACAF Championship: 1985

=== Individual ===
- Pacific Coast League Rookie of the Year, 1972–73
- Greater Victoria Sports Hall of Fame, 2001
- BC Soccer Award of Merit, 2004
- VISL Team of the Half Century, 2015
