= Igor Vrablic =

Canadian former soccer player (born 1965)

Personal information
- Date of birth: 19 July 1965 (age 61)
- Place of birth: Bratislava, Czechoslovakia
- Position: Striker

Senior career*
Years	Team	Apps	(Gls)
1983–1984	Golden Bay Earthquakes (indoor)	8	(2)
1984	Golden Bay Earthquakes	11	(4)
1985–1986	RFC Sérésien	14	(3)
1986–1987	Olympiacos	7	(1)
1988	Toronto Blizzard	22	(8)
1989	Toronto Panhellenic		
1991	North York Atletico Argentina		

International career
1982	Canada U20	4	(2)
1983–1984	Canada U23	13	(2)
1984–1986	Canada	34	(9)
Medal record
Representing Canada
Men's Association football
CONCACAF Championship
Winner	1985 North America
- * Club domestic league appearances and goals

Igor Vrablic (born 19 July 1965) is a Canadian former soccer player who played at both professional and international levels, as a striker.

== Early and personal life ==
Vrablic was born in Bratislava and raised in Waterloo, Ontario.

== Club career ==
Vrablic played with Kitchener Beograd at youth level. He was drafted in the 2nd round, 13th overall in the 1982 NASL entry draft by the Toronto Blizzard. He played in the United States, Belgium, and Greece for the Golden Bay Earthquakes, RFC Sérésien and Olympiacos. He played for the Toronto Blizzard in 1988. In 1989, Vrablic played in the National Soccer League with Toronto Panhellenic. In 1991, he continued playing in the National Soccer League with North York Atletico Argentina SC.

== International career ==
Vrablic earned 34 caps for Canada, representing them in the 1984 Summer Olympics and 1986 FIFA World Cup. His international career ended in 1986.

=== International goals ===
#	Date	City	Opponent	Result	Competition
1	10 March 1985	National Stadium, Port of Spain, Trinidad and Tobago	Trinidad and Tobago	2–1	Friendly
2	13 March 1985	Montego Bay, Jamaica	Jamaica	1–1	Friendly
3	2 April 1985	BC Place, Vancouver, Canada	United States	2–0	Friendly
4	2 April 1985	BC Place, Vancouver, Canada	United States	2–0	Friendly
5	13 April 1985	Royal Athletic Park, Victoria, Canada	Haiti	2–0	1986 FIFA World Cup qualification
6	8 May 1985	Stade Sylvio Cator, Port-au-Prince, Haiti	Haiti	2–0	1986 FIFA World Cup qualification
7	14 September 1985	King George V Park, St. John's, Canada	Honduras	2–1	1986 FIFA World Cup qualification
8	10 May 1986	Varsity Stadium, Toronto, Canada	Wales	2–0	Friendly
9	24 August 1986	Singapore	Singapore	1–0	Merlion Cup

== Honours ==
Canada

- CONCACAF Championship: 1985
