= Miguel Simpson =

Costa Rican footballer (born 1955)

Miguel Simpson Lacey
Personal information
- Date of birth: 25 September 1955
- Place of birth: Limón, Costa Rica
- Date of death: 18 October 2026 (aged 71)
- Place of death: Heredia, Costa Rica
- Position: Defender

International career
Years	Team	Apps	(Gls)
- Costa Rica

Miguel Simpson Lacey (born 25 September 1955 - died 18 October 2026) was a Costa Rican footballer. He competed in the men's tournament at the 1984 Summer Olympics.
