= Featherstone Field =

College sports stadium in California, U.S

- Interactive map of Featherstone Field
- Location: 16007 Crenshaw Boulevard, Torrance, California 90506
- Coordinates: 33°53′4″N 118°19′56″W
- Owner: El Camino College
- Capacity: 12,127

Construction
- Opened: 1958
- Renovated: 2016

Tenants
- El Camino College (1958-present); Los Angeles Aztecs (NASL) (1975–1976)

Featherstone Field, previously known as Murdock Stadium is a stadium on the campus of El Camino College in Torrance, California.

Built in 1958, the stadium seats around 12,127 on wood-backed bleacher seats. It was home to the North American Soccer League's Los Angeles Aztecs for two years (1975–1976), the American Soccer League's Southern California Lazers for a single season in 1978, as well as several United States men's national soccer team FIFA World Cup qualification matches. Today, it hosts El Camino College's American football team. The stadium was originally named after the founding president of the college, Forrest G. Murdock.

The stadium was also used as the main stadium in the 2005 remake of the 1974 film, The Longest Yard. The 2005 film starred Adam Sandler, Chris Rock, James Cromwell and Burt Reynolds, who actually played the lead role in the original film.

The original stadium was demolished and a new state of the art stadium was opened in September 2016. In 2019, El Camino College announced that they would rename the field inside Murdock Stadium after longtime football coach John Featherstone, a former coach at El Camino. The stadium is also the annual host site of California Interscholastic Federation (CIF) Los Angeles City Section high school football championship games.

== International games ==
Date	Competition	Team	Res	Team
19 May 1985	1986 FIFA World Cup Qualification	United States	1–0	Trinidad and Tobago
31 May 1985	1986 FIFA World Cup Qualification	United States	0–1	Costa Rica
13 May 1989	1990 FIFA World Cup Qualification	United States	1–1	Trinidad and Tobago
16 March 1991	1991 North American Nations Cup	United States	2–0	Canada
