= Jorge Ulate =

Costa Rican footballer (born 1956)

Personal information
- Full name: Jorge Manuel Ulate Arguedas
- Date of birth: April 14, 1956 (age 70)
- Place of birth: Heredia, Costa Rica
- Position: Striker

Senior career*
Years	Team	Apps	(Gls)
1977–1983	Herediano		
1978	→ Mcp. Puntarenas (loan)		
1984–1987	Alajuelense		
1988–1989	Olimpia		(3)
1989–1990	Victoria	9	(0)
- San Miguel
- Guanacasteca
- Generaleña
- Turrialba
1992	Carmelita		

International career^{‡}
1979–1985	Costa Rica	14	(8)

Managerial career
- 2001: Alajuelense
- 2003: UCR
- 2005: Costa Rica U-20 (assistant)
- 2006: Herediano (assistant)
- 2008–2010: El Roble
- * Club domestic league appearances and goals ‡ National team caps and goals as of 27 April 2015

Jorge Manuel Ulate Arguedas (born 14 April 1956) is a retired Costa Rican football striker.

== Club career ==
Nicknamed Gugui, Ulate made his professional debut for hometown club Herediano on 5 June 1977 and also had a significant stay with Alajuelense, becoming the league's top goalscorer twice, in 1984 with 17 goals and in 1985 with 21 goals. He scored a total of 130 league goals.

He also played for Honduran top clubs Olimpia and Victoria and had spells with smaller Costa Rican clubs.

== International career ==
He made his debut for Costa Rica in a May 1979 Olympic Games qualifier against Panama and earned a total of 14 caps, scoring 8 goals. He represented his country in 3 FIFA World Cup qualification matches.

== Managerial career ==
Ulate replaced Luis Roberto Sibaja as manager of second division side Universidad in summer 2003. He managed his son Jorge Pablo in 2010 when in charge of El Roble.
