= Alex Bunbury =

Canadian soccer player (born 1967)

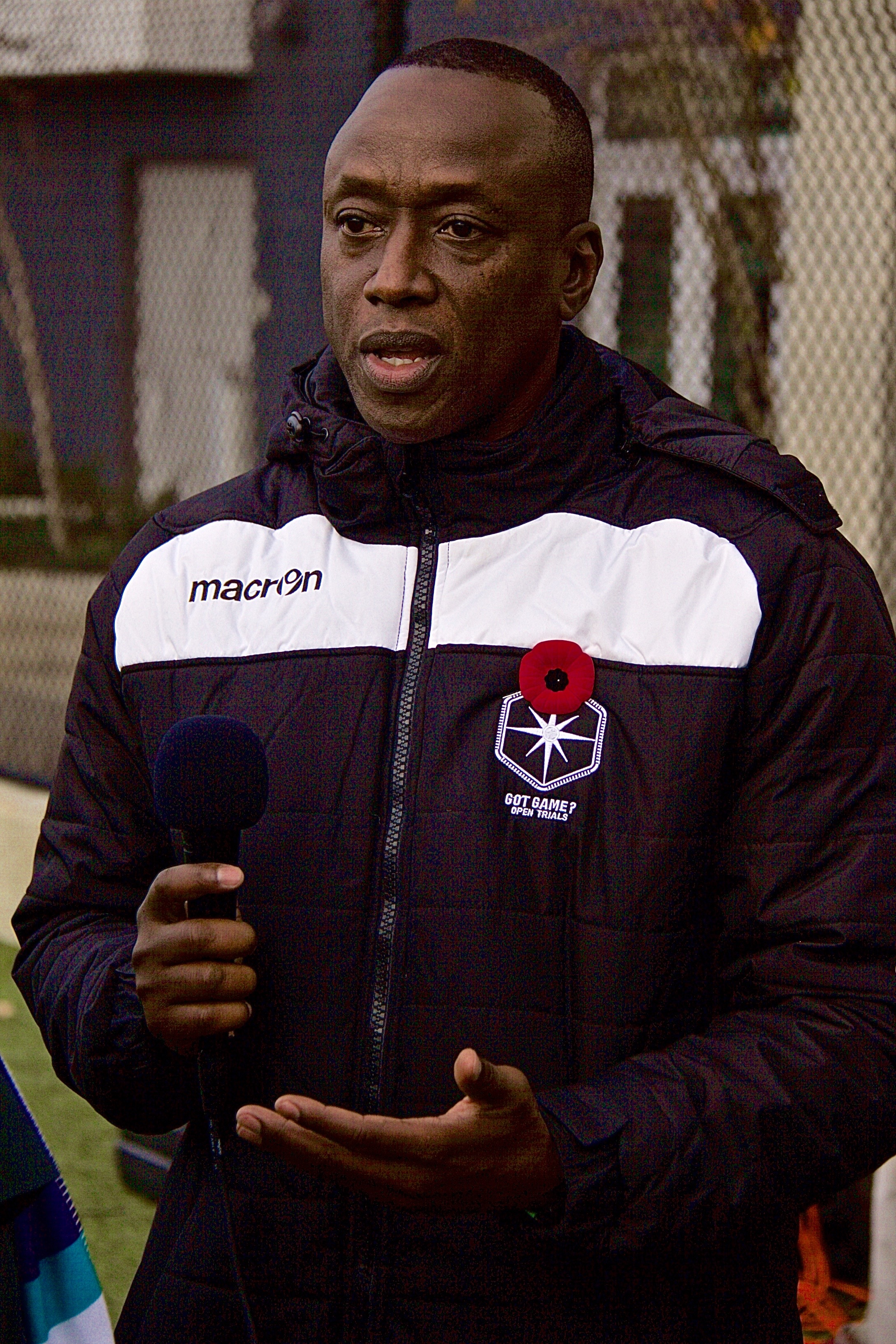
- Bunbury in 2018

Personal information
- Full name: Alexander Bunbury
- Date of birth: 18 June 1967 (age 59)
- Place of birth: Plaisance, Guyana
- Height: 1.86 m (6 ft 1 in)
- Position: Striker

Senior career*
Years	Team	Apps	(Gls)
1987–1990	Hamilton Steelers	71	(27)
1987–1988	Minnesota Strikers	12	(0)
1990	Toronto Blizzard	6	(1)
1991	Montreal Supra	24	(7)
1992–1993	West Ham United	4	(0)
1993–1999	Marítimo	165	(59)
1999–2000	Kansas City Wizards	24	(4)
Total		269	(110)

International career
1984–1985	Canada U20	9	(3)
1986–1997	Canada	66	(15)

Managerial career
- 2000–2008: Bangu Tsunami FC
- 2008–2012: Minnesota Thunder (academy)
- 2014–2015: Minnesota Twin Stars
- * Club domestic league appearances and goals

Alexander Bunbury (born 18 June 1967) is a former professional soccer player who played as a striker. Born in Guyana, he represented the Canadian men's national team.

During his 13-year professional career he played for West Ham United, Marítimo and Kansas City Wizards, among other clubs, as well as the Canadian national team. Bunbury was inducted into the Canadian Soccer Hall of Fame in April 2006.

Following a coaching career, Bunbury lead an investment group and purchased C.D. Portosantense in April 2024, becoming the club's new president with a 90% ownership stake.

== Early life ==
Bunbury was born on 18 June 1967 in Plaisance, Guyana. He has twelve siblings. He moved with his family to Canada at the age of nine.

== Club career ==
Bunbury started playing professionally with the Hamilton Steelers, where he was managed by John Charles. He also had one-year spells with the Minnesota Strikers of the Major Indoor Soccer League, where he would later make his home, and the Toronto Blizzard and Montreal Supra of the Canadian Soccer League.

In 1993, after an unassuming season for West Ham United (only six appearances overall), he moved to Portugal's C.S. Marítimo, going on to become the club's all-time leading goal scorer in the Primeira Liga with 59 goals. In his second season, he won the Foreign Player of the Year award, and he scored a career-best 15 goals in the 1998–99 campaign, helping his team to the tenth position in what was his final year in Madeira.

In early 1999, after requesting a move to play closer to his hometown of Montreal, Bunbury returned to North America, and retired after two seasons with the Kansas City Wizards of Major League Soccer. Subsequently, he took up coaching in Minnesota, first with youth team Bangu Tsunami FC and later at the Minnesota Thunder Academy.

Bunbury was inducted into the Canadian Soccer Hall of Fame in April 2006. In 2012, as part of the Canadian Soccer Association's centennial celebration, he was named to the all-time Canada XI men's team.

== International career ==
Bunbury played in all three of Canada's games at the 1985 FIFA World Youth Championship in the Soviet Union. He made his debut with the senior side in an August 1986 Merlion Cup match against Singapore, and went on to earn 65 caps and score 15 goals during 11 years.

Bunbury ranked fourth in the all-time scorer's list in June 2008, and eighth in appearances. He represented the nation in 30 FIFA World Cup qualifiers, and played at the inaugural 1989 FIFA Futsal World Championship.

Bunbury's final international was a November 1997 World Cup qualification match against Costa Rica, a game after which Paul Dolan, Geoff Aunger, Frank Yallop and Colin Miller also said farewell to the national team.

== Personal life ==
After his retirement, Bunbury made Prior Lake, Minnesota, his home, where he worked as a youth soccer coach and trainer. He has three children with his ex-wife, Kristi Novak-Bunbury: actress Kylie, professional soccer player Teal, and Logan. He has one child with Andrea Hutton Pridgen: Mataeo.

In 2018, Bunbury lead an investment group in purchasing Portuguese lower league club S.U. 1º Dezembro.

Bunbury led negotiations with former club Marítimo in 2023 regarding financial investment in the Madeira-based team. A year later, in 2024, Bunbury led an investment group and purchased C.D. Portosantense, becoming the club's new President with a 90% ownership stake. The Canadian stated his aim to develop a new stadium for the club and take the team to the second division within 5 years.

== Career statistics ==
Scores and results list Canada's goal tally first, score column indicates score after each Bunbury goal.

List of international goals scored by Alex Bunbury
No.	Date	Venue	Opponent	Score	Result	Competition
1	6 September 1986	Singapore, Singapore	Singapore	1–0	1–0	Merlion Cup
2	30 September 1987	Estadio Cuscatlán, San Salvador, El Salvador	El Salvador	1–0	1–2	Friendly
3	15 November 1992	Swangard Stadium, Burnaby, Canada	Bermuda	1–0	4–2	1994 FIFA World Cup qualification
4	15 November 1992	Swangard Stadium, Burnaby, Canada	Bermuda	2–0	4–2	1994 FIFA World Cup qualification
5	15 November 1992	Swangard Stadium, Burnaby, Canada	Bermuda	3–0	4–2	1994 FIFA World Cup qualification
6	4 April 1993	Estadio Nacional, Tegucigalpa, Honduras	Honduras	2–1	2–2	1994 FIFA World Cup qualification
7	11 April 1993	Swangard Stadium, Burnaby, Canada	El Salvador	1–0	2–0	1994 FIFA World Cup qualification
8	9 May 1993	Varsity Stadium, Toronto, Canada	Mexico	1–0	1–2	1994 FIFA World Cup qualification
9	15 July 1993	Estadio Azteca, Mexico City, Mexico	Martinique	2–0	2–2	1993 CONCACAF Gold Cup
10	26 January 1995	SkyDome, Toronto, Canada	Portugal	1–1	1–1	SkyDome Cup
11	10 October 1996	Commonwealth Stadium, Edmonton, Canada	Cuba	1–0	2–0	1998 FIFA World Cup qualification
12	3 November 1996	Swangard Stadium, Burnaby, Canada	El Salvador	1–0	1–0	1998 FIFA World Cup qualification
13	15 December 1996	Estadio Cuscatlán, San Salvador, El Salvador	El Salvador	2–0	2–0	1998 FIFA World Cup qualification
14	14 September 1997	Estadio Cuscatlán, San Salvador, El Salvador	El Salvador	1–1	1–4	1998 FIFA World Cup qualification
15	12 October 1997	Commonwealth Stadium, Edmonton, Canada	Mexico	1–2	2–2	1998 FIFA World Cup qualification

== Honours ==
Marítimo

- Taça de Portugal runner-up: 1994–95

Kansas City Wizards

- MLS Cup: 2000
- MLS Supporters' Shield: 2000

Individual

- Canadian International Player of the Year: 1993, 1995
- Primeira Liga: Foreign Player of the Year 1994–95
