= Farlen Ilama =

Costa Rican footballer (born 1972)

Personal information
- Full name: Farlen Ilama Solís
- Date of birth: 25 August 1972 (age 54)
- Place of birth: San Isidro de El General, Costa Rica
- Height: 1.66 m (5 ft 5 1/2 in)
- Position: Striker

Senior career*
Years	Team	Apps	(Gls)
1992–1997	Pérez Zeledón		
1997–2000	Saprissa	79	(16)
2000–2001	Pérez Zeledón		
2001–2002	Carmelita		
2002–2003	Municipal Osa		
2003	Pérez Zeledón		
2004–2005	Ramonense		
2007–2008	Carmelita		
Total		399	(97)

International career
1992–1997	Costa Rica	12	(2)
- * Club domestic league appearances and goals

Farlen Ilama Solís (born 25 August 1972) is a retired Costa Rican football player, who played the majority of his career for Pérez Zeledón.

== Club career ==
A short-built striker, Ilama made his professional debut on 19 January 1992 for hometown club Pérez Zeledón against Alajuelense and played a total of 221 games for the club, scoring 70 goals. He had trials with German Zweite Bundesliga sides Carl Zeiss Jena, Wattenscheid and Waldhof Mannheim in 1995, but no transfer materialized. He also played for Costa Rica giants Saprissa, joining them in summer 1997, as well as Carmelita, Municipal Osa before returning at Pérez Zeledón in 2003, six months after leaving an alcohol clinic. He then moved to Ramonense in 2004 and finished his career in 2005. He however returned to Carmelita in 2007.

As of March 2003, Ilama totalled 367 league games, scoring 90 goals, ending up with 399 games and 97 goals. During his career, Ilama battled an alcohol addiction.

== International career ==
Ilama made his debut for Costa Rica in a May 1992 friendly match against Ecuador and earned a total of 12 caps, scoring 2 goals. He represented his country in 2 FIFA World Cup qualification matches, scoring in his final international game.

His final international was a November 1997 FIFA World Cup qualification match against Canada.

=== International goals ===
Scores and results list. Costa Rica's goal tally first.

#	Date	Venue	Opponent	Score	Result	Competition
1.	28 May 1995	Raymond James Stadium, Tampa, United States	United States	1–0	2–1	Friendly match
2.	16 November 1997	Estadio Nacional, San José, Costa Rica	Canada	2–0	3–1	1998 FIFA World Cup qualification

== Personal life ==
He has a daughter, Anyale Kharina, from his first marriage and another child with his second wife.
