= Julio Gómez (footballer, born 1954) =

Guatemalan footballer (born 1954)

Personal information
- Full name: Julio Roberto Gómez Rendón
- Date of birth: 28 October 1954 (age 72)
- Height: 1.67 m (5 ft 6 in)

International career
Years	Team	Apps	(Gls)
- Guatemala
Medal record
Men's football
Representing Guatemala
Pan American Games
Bronze medal – third place	1983 Caracas	Team

Julio Roberto Gómez Rendón (Note: In this Spanish name, the first or paternal surname is Gómez and the second or maternal family name is Rendón.) (born 28 October 1954) is a Guatemalan footballer. He competed in the men's tournament at the 1976 Summer Olympics.
