= Football at the 1988 Summer Olympics – Men's European Qualifiers =

Men's European Qualifier
Tournament details
- Teams: 27 (from 1 confederation)

The European Qualifiers for men's football competitions at the 1988 Summer Olympics to be held in Seoul. The tournament took place from 10 September 1986 to 31 May 1988 including a preliminary round. At the end, five countries qualified including West Germany, Italy, Sweden, Soviet Union, and Yugoslavia.

The draw for the tournament took place on 27 May 1986 in Mexico City just before the 1986 FIFA World Cup in Mexico. Out of 34 European football nations at the time in tournament participated only 27 with five allowing for qualification to the Summer Olympics football tournament. All participants were split in five groups of five teams with winners of each qualify for the Olympics. Four teams were contesting two berths in two of five groups.

Seven football nations that did not participate included four team of British islands (England, Northern Ireland, Scotland, Wales) that refused to form the unified Great Britain team required by the International Olympic Committee (IOC), Malta (never fielded its team previously), Luxembourg (not fielding in 1980s), and Albania (political restrictions since 1972).

Turkey and Eastern Bloc nations such as East Germany, Poland and the Soviet Union, that boycotted the 1984 Olympics football tournament in Los Angeles, returned to the Olympic competition.

== Summary ==
Group winners from the five-team groups qualified directly for the 1988 Summer Olympics
Other teams were eliminated
Prelimininaries' teams were eliminated

Group A	Group B	Group C	Group D	Group E
West Germany	Italy	Sweden	Soviet Union	Yugoslavia
Denmark Poland Romania Greece	East Germany Portugal Netherlands Iceland	Hungary Spain Republic of Ireland France	Bulgaria Switzerland Norway Turkey	Czechoslovakia Belgium Austria Finland
Cyprus			Liechtenstein	

== Group A ==
=== Preliminary play-off ===
Team 1	Agg.	Team 2	1st leg	2nd leg
Cyprus	1–4	Greece	1–2	0–2

12 November 1986

Cyprus	1–2	Greece
Pavlos Savva 45'		Ioannis Samaras 54'; Charis Mbaniotis 64'

Limassol, Cyprus
10 December 1986

Greece	2–0	Cyprus
Ioannis Samaras 72', 77'

Thessaloniki, Greece

=== Group stage ===
Pos	Team	Pld	W	D	L	GF	GA	GD	Pts	Qualification	Germany Olympic football team	Denmark Olympic football team	Poland Olympic football team	Romania Olympic football team	Greece Olympic football team
1	West Germany	8	5	2	1	16	4	+12	12	1988 Summer Olympics	—	1–1	5–1	3–0	3–0
2	Denmark	8	5	1	2	23	5	+18	11		0–1	—	3–0	8–0	4–0
3	Poland	8	4	2	2	11	10	+1	10		1–1	2–0*	—	1–0	5–1
4	Romania	8	2	1	5	5	17	−12	5		1–0	1–2	0–0	—	0–1
5	Greece	8	1	0	7	4	23	−19	2		0–2	0–5	0–1	2–3	—

18 April 1987

Romania	1–0	West Germany
Gavril Balint 2'

Cluj Napoca, Romania
20 May 1987

Greece	0–5	Denmark
		Flemming Povlsen 12'; Claus Nielsen 16', 27'; Ulrik Moseby 77'; Kim Vilfort 79'

Livadeia, Greece
20 May 1987

Romania	0–0	Poland

Cluj Napoca, Romania
10 June 1987

Denmark	8–0	Romania
Claus Nielsen 6', 66', 83'; Ulrik Moseby 28'; Bjørn Kristensen 30'; Lars Olsen 51'; Flemming Povlsen 77'; John Jensen 79'

Aalborg, Denmark
3 September 1987

Romania	1–2	Denmark
Gavril Balint 84' (pen.)		Kent Nielsen 20'; Lars Olsen 68'

Bacău, Romania
22 September 1987

West Germany	3–0	Greece
Frank Mill 16', 86'; Wolfram Wuttke 63'

Offenbach am Main, West Germany
13 October 1987

West Germany	5–1	Poland
Jürgen Klinsmann 10', 43'; Wolfram Wuttke 21'; Frank Mill 23'; Christian Hochstätter 90'		Kazimierz Sokołowski 34'

Osnabrück, West Germany
28 October 1987

Poland	x – x (Note: The Poland vs Denmark match on originally ended 0-2, but FIFA announced on 13 November 1987 that Denmark had fielded an ineligible player (Per Frimann), and thus the result was overturned, and Poland were awarded the match by a default score of 2-0.)	Denmark
		Kim Vilfort 25', 71'

Szczecin, Poland
18 November 1987

Denmark	0–1	West Germany
		Wolfram Wuttke 52'

Århus, Denmark
2 December 1987

Greece	0–1	Poland
		Andrzej Rudy

Ioannina, Greece
12 December 1987

Greece	0–2	West Germany
		Christian Schreier 32'; Fritz Walter 34'

Larissa, Greece
16 March 1988

Poland	5–1	Greece
Grzegorz Wiezik 16'; Jan Furtok 3 x ?		Alexandros Tziolis 10'

Rybnik, Poland
30 March 1988

West Germany	1–1	Denmark
Armin Görtz 56'		Claus Nielsen 75'

Osnabrück, West Germany
30 March 1988

Poland	1–0	Romania
Marek Leśniak 84'

Piotrków Trybunalski, Poland
13 April 1988

Romania	0–1	Greece
		Alexandros Alexiou 24'

București, Romania
20 April 1988

Denmark	4–0	Greece
Flemming Povlsen 5', 37'; Brian Laudrup 23'; Claus Nielsen 69'

Aalborg, Denmark
27 April 1988

Poland	1–1	West Germany
Jan Furtok 76' (pen.)		Frank Mill 89'

Chorzów, Poland
18 May 1988

Denmark	3–0	Poland
Bjørn Kristensen 14'; Flemming Povlsen 68'; Kim Vilfort 89'

Århus, Denmark
18 May 1988

Greece	2–3	Romania
Ioukoudis 24'; Theodoros Pachatouridis 26' (pen.)		Haralambie Antohi 2'; Claudiu Vaișcovici 31'; Gavril Balint 40' (pen.)

Athens, Greece
31 May 1988

West Germany	3–0	Romania
Wolfram Wuttke 38' (pen.); Jürgen Klinsmann 57', 73'

Dortmund, West Germany

== Group B ==
Pos	Team	Pld	W	D	L	GF	GA	GD	Pts	Qualification	Italy Olympic football team	East Germany Olympic football team	Portugal Olympic football team	Netherlands Olympic football team	Iceland Olympic football team
1	Italy	8	5	3	0	11	1	+10	13	1988 Summer Olympics	—	1–1	1–0	3–0	2–0
2	East Germany	8	4	3	1	12	5	+7	11		0–0	—	3–0	4–2	3–0
3	Portugal	8	2	4	2	4	6	−2	8		0–0	0–0	—	1–1	2–1
4	Netherlands	8	1	3	4	6	12	−6	5		0–1	0–1	0–0	—	1–0
5	Iceland	8	1	1	6	5	14	−9	3		0–3	2–0	0–1	2–2	—

3 December 1986

Netherlands	0–1	East Germany
		Damian Halata

Utrecht, Netherlands
18 February 1987

Italy	1–0	Portugal
Roberto Galia 72'

Lecce, Italy
25 February 1987

Portugal	1–1	Netherlands
Cerqueiro		Peter van Velzen

Porto, Portugal
25 March 1987

East Germany	0–0	Italy

Magdeburg, East Germany
15 April 1987

Italy	2–0	Iceland
Pietro Paolo Virdis 41'; Mauro Tassotti 87'

Pescara, Italy
29 April 1987

Portugal	0–0	East Germany

Viseu, Portugal
26 May 1987

Iceland	2–2	Netherlands
Guðmundur Torfason 33', 53' (pen.)		Hennie Meyer 14'; Mario Been 56'

Reykjavík, Iceland
2 September 1987

Iceland	2–0	East Germany
Guðmundur Torfason 50'; Ólafur Þórðarson 80'

Reykjavík, Iceland
22 September 1987

East Germany	4–2	Netherlands
Damian Halata 30' (pen.); Hans Richter 45'; Markus Wuckel 47'; Heiko Peschke 85'		Hans Gillhaus; Juul Ellerman

Nordhausen, East Germany
7 October 1987

Portugal	2–1	Iceland
Coelho 22'; António Aparício 51'		Guðmundur Steinsson 59'

Leiria, Portugal
18 November 1987

Italy	1–1	East Germany
Marco Pacione 13'		Thomas Doll 8'

Rome, Italy
24 February 1988

Portugal	0–0	Italy

Oeiras, Portugal
9 March 1988

Netherlands	0–1	Italy
		Pietro Paolo Virdis

Groningen, Netherlands
29 March 1988

Netherlands	0–0	Portugal

Zwolle, Netherlands
13 April 1988

Italy	3–0	Netherlands
Andrea Carnevale; Pietro Paolo Virdis 2x

Padua, Italy
13 April 1988

East Germany	3–0	Portugal
Olaf Marschall; Matthias Lindner; Hans Richter

Aue, East Germany
27 April 1988

Netherlands	1–0	Iceland
Ruud Brood

Doetinchem, Netherlands
30 April 1988

East Germany	3–0	Iceland
Olaf Marschall; Jürgen Raab; Heiko Peschke

Bischofswerda, East Germany
24 May 1988

Iceland	0–1	Portugal
		Miguel 89'

Reykjavík, Iceland
29 May 1988

Iceland	0–3	Italy
		Francesco Romano; Pietro Paolo Virdis; Andrea Carnevale

Reykjavík, Iceland

== Group C ==
Pos	Team	Pld	W	D	L	GF	GA	GD	Pts	Qualification	Sweden Olympic football team	Hungary Olympic football team	Spain Olympic football team	Republic of Ireland Olympic national football team	France Olympic football team
1	Sweden	8	6	1	1	13	6	+7	13	1988 Summer Olympics	—	1–0	2–0	1–0	4–2
2	Hungary	8	5	1	2	13	8	+5	11		2–1	—	2–1	3–1	2–2
3	Spain	8	1	4	3	9	12	−3	6		1–1	1–0	—	2–2	1–2
4	Republic of Ireland	8	1	3	4	10	12	−2	5		0–1	1–2	2–2	—	3–0
5	France	8	1	3	4	9	16	−7	5		1–2	0–2	1–1	1–1	—

19 November 1986

Spain	1–1	Sweden
Manuel Zúñiga 75'		Mats Jingblad 63'

Madrid, Spain
19 November 1986

Republic of Ireland	1–2	Hungary
Mick Byrne 59'		Sándor Rostás 67'; Sándor Steidl 79'

Milltown, Ireland
4 February 1987

Republic of Ireland	2–2	Spain
Noel Larkin 25'; Mick Byrne 46'		Genar Andrinúa 41'; Manuel Zúñiga 71'

Tolka Park, Ireland
28 April 1987

France	0–2	Hungary
		István Vincze 14'; Gyula Plotár 62'

Aix-en-Provence, France
5 May 1987

Sweden	1–0	Republic of Ireland
Ola Svensson 90'

Malmö, Sweden
13 May 1987

Hungary	2–1	Spain
Gyula Plotár 32'; József Dzurják 64'		Rafael Martín Vázquez 35'

Budapest, Hungary
3 June 1987

Hungary	2–1	Sweden
Gyula Plotár 2x		Leif Forsberg

Budapest, Hungary
16 June 1987

Sweden	4–2	France
Jan Hellström; Leif Forsberg; Leif Engqvist 2x		Patrick Cubaynes 8'; Bruno Roux 17'

Malmö, Sweden
11 August 1987

France	1–1	Republic of Ireland
Thierry Fernier 54'		Noel Larkin 17'

Dunkerque, France
26 August 1987

Republic of Ireland	0–1	Sweden
		Jan Hellström 22'

Dalymount Park, Ireland
9 September 1987

Sweden	1–0	Hungary
Michael Andersson

Örebro, Sweden
23 September 1987

Sweden	2–0	Spain
Jonas Thern 86'; Jan Hellström 87'

Skellefteå, Sweden
13 October 1987

Spain	1–2	France
Ramón Vázquez 18'		Antoine Kombouaré 56'; Éric Péan 76'

Burgos, Spain
18 November 1987

Spain	1–0	Hungary
Eusebio Sacristán 66'

Melilla, Spain
18 November 1987

Republic of Ireland	3–0	France
Peter Eccles 19'; Mick Bennett 24', 59'

Dalymount Park, Ireland
23 March 1988

France	1–1	Spain
Thierry Fernier 66'		Ramón Vázquez 4'

Le Havre, France
27 April 1988

Hungary	2–2	France
György Katona; Imre Fodor 59' (pen.)		Bruno Roux 54'; Fabrice Mege 56'

Budapest, Hungary
4 May 1988

Hungary	3–1	Republic of Ireland
Béla Melis 25'; György Katona 32'; Péter Rubold 88'		Dave Barry 84'

Budapest, Hungary
18 May 1988

Spain	2–2	Republic of Ireland
Ramón Vázquez 42', 61'		Barry Kehoe 17'; Noel Larkin 60'

Estadio José Rico Pérez, Alicante, Spain
25 May 1988

France	1–2	Sweden
Philippe Prieur 40'		Peter Lönn (pen.); Michael Andersson

Lens, France

== Group D ==
=== Preliminary play-off ===
Team 1	Agg.	Team 2	1st leg	2nd leg
Liechtenstein	0–19	Switzerland	0–10	0–9

10 September 1986

Liechtenstein	0–10	Switzerland
		Walter Pellegrini 1', 58'; Alain Sutter 4', 43', 64'; Philippe Hertig 27', 49'; René Müller 77', 88'; Roger Hegi 80'

Triesen, Liechtenstein
23 September 1986

Switzerland	9–0	Liechtenstein
Walter Pellegrini 30', 32', 71'; Christophe Bonvin 47', 90'; Alain Sutter 44'; Philippe Hertig 49'; Beat Rietmann 60'; Roger Hegi 62'

St. Gallen, Switzerland

=== Group stage ===
Pos	Team	Pld	W	D	L	GF	GA	GD	Pts	Qualification
1	Soviet Union	8	6	2	0	12	2	+10	14	1988 Summer Olympics
2	Bulgaria	8	4	2	2	13	5	+8	10	
3	Switzerland	8	2	3	3	8	10	−2	7	
4	Norway	8	0	5	3	1	7	−6	5	
5	Turkey	8	1	2	5	5	15	−10	4	

14 October 1986

Norway	0–0	Soviet Union

Oslo, Norway
8 November 1986

Switzerland	1–0	Norway
Martin Müller 55'

Lucerne, Switzerland
3 December 1986

Turkey	3–2	Switzerland
Erdoğan Yılmaz 26'; Ziya Doğan 27', 71'		Patrice Mottiez 7'; Roger Hegi 80'

Bursa, Turkey
15 April 1987

Turkey	0–2	Soviet Union
		Volodymyr Lyutyi 23'; Igor Dobrovolski 70'

İzmir, Turkey
16 April 1987

Switzerland	1–1	Bulgaria
Christophe Bonvin 27'		Petar Aleksandrov 67'

Langenthal, Switzerland
6 May 1987

Norway	1–1	Turkey
Jostein Flo 5'		Nusret Erdi Demir 1'

Moss, Norway
7 May 1987

Bulgaria	0–1	Soviet Union
		Oleksiy Mykhailychenko 63'

Sofia, Bulgaria
26 May 1987

Norway	0–0	Bulgaria

Trondheim, Norway
12 August 1987

Soviet Union	1–0	Norway
Volodymyr Lyutyi 48'

Moscow, Soviet Union
26 August 1987

Norway	0–0	Switzerland

Tromsø, Norway
7 October 1987

Switzerland	2–0	Turkey
Martin Müller 38'; Kubilay Türkyilmaz 83'

Zürich, Switzerland
28 October 1987

Switzerland	2–4	Soviet Union
Kubilay Türkyilmaz 16'; Roger Kundert 55'		Volodymyr Lyutyi 36'; Igor Dobrovolski 65' (pen.); Stasys Baranauskas 79', 83'

Lausanne, Switzerland
14 November 1987

Bulgaria	4–0	Norway
Stoycho Stoev 12', 24'; Aleksandar Bonchev 68'; Lyuboslav Penev 71'

Sofia, Bulgaria
18 November 1987

Turkey	0–0	Norway

Ankara, Turkey
9 December 1987

Turkey	0–3	Bulgaria
		Lyuboslav Penev 19'; Stoycho Stoev 30'; Georgi Georgiev 81'

Konya, Turkey
6 April 1988

Bulgaria	2–0	Switzerland
Petar Aleksandrov; Aleksandar Bonchev

Sofia, Bulgaria
6 April 1988

Soviet Union	2–0	Turkey
Yuri Savichev 36'; Aleksandr Borodyuk 86'

Simferopol, Soviet Union
27 April 1988

Soviet Union	2–0	Bulgaria
Oleksiy Mykhailychenko 41'; Yevgeni Kuznetsov 72'

Simferopol, Soviet Union
10 May 1988

Soviet Union	0–0	Switzerland

Moscow, Soviet Union
25 May 1988

Bulgaria	3–1	Turkey
Vasil Dragolov 11', 15'; Petar Mihtarski 53'		Uğur Tütüneker 55'

Blagoevgrad, Bulgaria

== Group E ==
Pos	Team	Pld	W	D	L	GF	GA	GD	Pts	Qualification
1	Yugoslavia	8	6	1	1	17	5	+12	13	1988 Summer Olympics
2	Czechoslovakia	8	6	0	2	10	3	+7	12	
3	Belgium	8	3	1	4	8	13	−5	7	
4	Austria	8	2	0	6	7	11	−4	4	
5	Finland	8	2	0	6	5	15	−10	4	

14 October 1986

Finland	0–2	Belgium
		Marc Degryse 57'; Benoît Thans 65' (pen.)

Tampere, Finland
29 October 1986

Czechoslovakia	2–0	Belgium
Peter Herda 51', 60'

Prague, Czechoslovakia
18 November 1986

Belgium	2–3	Austria
Beugnies; Goossens		Andreas Spielmann; Manfred Zsak; P.J. Werner

Ghent, Belgium
14 April 1987

Austria	2–0	Czechoslovakia
Rupert Marko; P.J. Werner

Salzburg, Austria
12 May 1987

Finland	2–1	Austria
Marko Myyry 14'; Jari Niinimäki 21'		Rupert Marko 89'

Pori, Finland
3 June 1987

Austria	0–1	Yugoslavia
		Semir Tuce

Graz, Austria
10 June 1987

Finland	0–2	Czechoslovakia
		Tomáš Skuhravý 43'; Peter Fieber 59'

Äänekoski, Finland
26 August 1987

Yugoslavia	2–1	Austria
Srečko Katanec; Dragan Stojković (pen.)		Paul Perstling

Maribor, Yugoslavia
2 September 1987

Yugoslavia	5–0	Finland
Radmilo Mihajlović,, Semir Tuce,

Banja Luka, Yugoslavia
23 September 1987

Czechoslovakia	2–0	Finland
Ľubomír Moravčík 31'; Radek Drulák 48'

Dunajská Streda, Czechoslovakia
24 September 1987

Belgium	2–2	Yugoslavia
Francis Severeyns,		Dejan Savićević; Sead Kajtaz

Charleroi, Belgium
7 October 1987

Belgium	0–2	Czechoslovakia
		Ivo Staš 44'; Tomáš Skuhravý 78'

Waregem, Belgium
28 October 1987

Czechoslovakia	1–0	Yugoslavia
Tomáš Skuhravý 87'

Prague, Czechoslovakia
28 October 1987

Belgium	1–0	Finland
Schoofs

Liège, Belgium
11 November 1987

Austria	0–1	Belgium
		Danny Boffin 71'

Linz, Austria
2 December 1987

Yugoslavia	4–0	Belgium
Dejan Savićević; Predrag Jurić; Davor Jozić,

12 April 1988

Czechoslovakia	1–0	Austria
Václav Daněk 67'

Nitra, Czechoslovakia
27 April 1988

Yugoslavia	1–0	Czechoslovakia
Borislav Cvetković 51'

Petrinja, Yugoslavia
18 May 1988

Finland	1–2	Yugoslavia
Seppo Nikkilä		Dragiša Binić; Dejan Savićević

Mikkeli, Finland
31 May 1988

Austria	0–2	Finland
		Seppo Nikkilä 64'; Ismo Lius 90'

Wolfsberg, Austria

== Goalscorers ==
7 goals

- (Denmark) Claus Nielsen

5 goals

- (Denmark) Flemming Povlsen
- (Italy) Pietro Paolo Virdis
- (Switzerland) Walter Pellegrini

4 goals

- (Denmark) Kim Vilfort
- (West Germany) Jürgen Klinsmann
- (West Germany) Frank Mill
- (West Germany) Wolfram Wuttke
- (Hungary) Gyula Plotár
- (Poland) Jan Furtok
- (Spain) Ramón Vázquez
- (Switzerland) Alain Sutter

3 goals

- (Bulgaria) Stoycho Stoev
- (Greece) Ioannis Samaras
- (Republic of Ireland) Noel Larkin
- (Iceland) Guðmundur Torfason
- (Romania) Gavril Balint
- (Switzerland) Christophe Bonvin
- (Switzerland) Roger Hegi
- (Switzerland) Philippe Hertig
- (Sweden) Jan Hellström
- (Czechoslovakia) Tomáš Skuhravý
- (Soviet Union) Volodymyr Lyutyi
- (Socialist Federal Republic of Yugoslavia) Radmilo Mihajlović
- (Socialist Federal Republic of Yugoslavia) Dejan Savićević
- (Socialist Federal Republic of Yugoslavia) Semir Tuce

2 goals

- (Austria) Rupert Marko
- (Austria) P.J. Werner
- (Belgium) Francis Severeyns
- (Bulgaria) Petar Aleksandrov
- (Bulgaria) Aleksandar Bonchev
- (Bulgaria) Vasil Dragolov
- (Bulgaria) Lyuboslav Penev
- (Denmark) Bjørn Kristensen
- (Denmark) Ulrik Moseby
- (Denmark) Lars Olsen
- (Finland) Seppo Nikkilä
- (France) Thierry Fernier
- (France) Bruno Roux
- (East Germany) Damian Halata
- (East Germany) Olaf Marschall
- (East Germany) Heiko Peschke
- (East Germany) Hans Richter
- (Hungary) György Katona
- (Republic of Ireland) Mick Bennett
- (Republic of Ireland) Mick Byrne
- (Italy) Andrea Carnevale
- (Spain) Manuel Zúñiga
- (Switzerland) Martin Müller
- (Switzerland) René Müller
- (Switzerland) Kubilay Türkyilmaz
- (Sweden) Michael Andersson
- (Sweden) Leif Engqvist
- (Sweden) Leif Forsberg
- (Czechoslovakia) Peter Herda
- (Turkey) Ziya Doğan
- (Soviet Union) Stanislovas Baranauskas
- (Soviet Union) Igor Dobrovolski
- (Soviet Union) Oleksiy Mykhailychenko
- (Socialist Federal Republic of Yugoslavia) Davor Jozić

1 goal

- (Austria) Paul Perstling
- (Austria) Andreas Spielmann
- (Austria) Manfred Zsak
- (Belgium) Beugnies
- (Belgium) Danny Boffin
- (Belgium) Marc Degryse
- (Belgium) Goossens
- (Belgium) Schoofs
- (Belgium) Benoît Thans
- (Bulgaria) Georgi Georgiev
- (Bulgaria) Petar Mihtarski
- (Cyprus) Pavlos Savva
- (Denmark) John Jensen
- (Denmark) Brian Laudrup
- (Denmark) Kent Nielsen
- (Finland) Ismo Lius
- (Finland) Marko Myyry
- (Finland) Jari Niinimäki
- (France) Patrick Cubaynes
- (France) Antoine Kombouaré
- (France) Fabrice Mege
- (France) Éric Péan
- (France) Philippe Prieur
- (West Germany) Armin Görtz
- (West Germany) Christian Hochstätter
- (West Germany) Christian Schreier
- (West Germany) Fritz Walter
- (East Germany) Thomas Doll
- (East Germany) Matthias Lindner
- (East Germany) Jürgen Raab
- (East Germany) Markus Wuckel
- (Greece) Alexandros Alexiou
- (Greece) Ioukoudis
- (Greece) Charis Mbaniotis
- (Greece) Theodoros Pachatouridis
- (Greece) Alexandros Tziolis
- (Hungary) József Dzurják
- (Hungary) Imre Fodor
- (Hungary) Béla Melis
- (Hungary) Sándor Rostás
- (Hungary) Péter Rubold
- (Hungary) Sándor Steidl
- (Hungary) István Vincze
- (Republic of Ireland) Dave Barry
- (Republic of Ireland) Peter Eccles
- (Republic of Ireland) Barry Kehoe
- (Iceland) Ólafur Þórðarson
- (Iceland) Guðmundur Steinsson
- (Italy) Roberto Galia
- (Italy) Marco Pacione
- (Italy) Francesco Romano
- (Italy) Mauro Tassotti
- (Netherlands) Mario Been
- (Netherlands) Ruud Brood
- (Netherlands) Juul Ellerman
- (Netherlands) Hans Gillhaus
- (Netherlands) Hennie Meyer
- (Netherlands) Peter van Velzen
- (Norway) Jostein Flo
- (Poland) Marek Leśniak
- (Poland) Andrzej Rudy
- (Poland) Kazimierz Sokołowski
- (Poland) Grzegorz Wiezik
- (Poland) ?
- (Portugal) António Aparício
- (Portugal) Cerqueiro
- (Portugal) Coelho
- (Portugal) Miguel
- (Romania) Haralambie Antohi
- (Romania) Claudiu Vaișcovici
- (Spain) Genar Andrinúa
- (Spain) Eusebio Sacristán
- (Spain) Rafael Martín Vázquez
- (Switzerland) Roger Kundert
- (Switzerland) Patrice Mottiez
- (Switzerland) Beat Rietmann
- (Sweden) Mats Jingblad
- (Sweden) Peter Lönn
- (Sweden) Ola Svensson
- (Sweden) Jonas Thern
- (Czechoslovakia) Václav Daněk
- (Czechoslovakia) Radek Drulák
- (Czechoslovakia) Peter Fieber
- (Czechoslovakia) Ľubomír Moravčík
- (Czechoslovakia) Ivo Staš
- (Turkey) Nusret Erdi Demir
- (Turkey) Uğur Tütüneker
- (Turkey) Erdoğan Yılmaz
- (Soviet Union) Aleksandr Borodyuk
- (Soviet Union) Yevgeni Kuznetsov
- (Soviet Union) Yuri Savichev
- (Socialist Federal Republic of Yugoslavia) Dragiša Binić
- (Socialist Federal Republic of Yugoslavia) Borislav Cvetković
- (Socialist Federal Republic of Yugoslavia) Predrag Jurić
- (Socialist Federal Republic of Yugoslavia) Sead Kajtaz
- (Socialist Federal Republic of Yugoslavia) Srečko Katanec
- (Socialist Federal Republic of Yugoslavia) Dragan Stojković
