= 1988–89 European Cup =

European football tournament

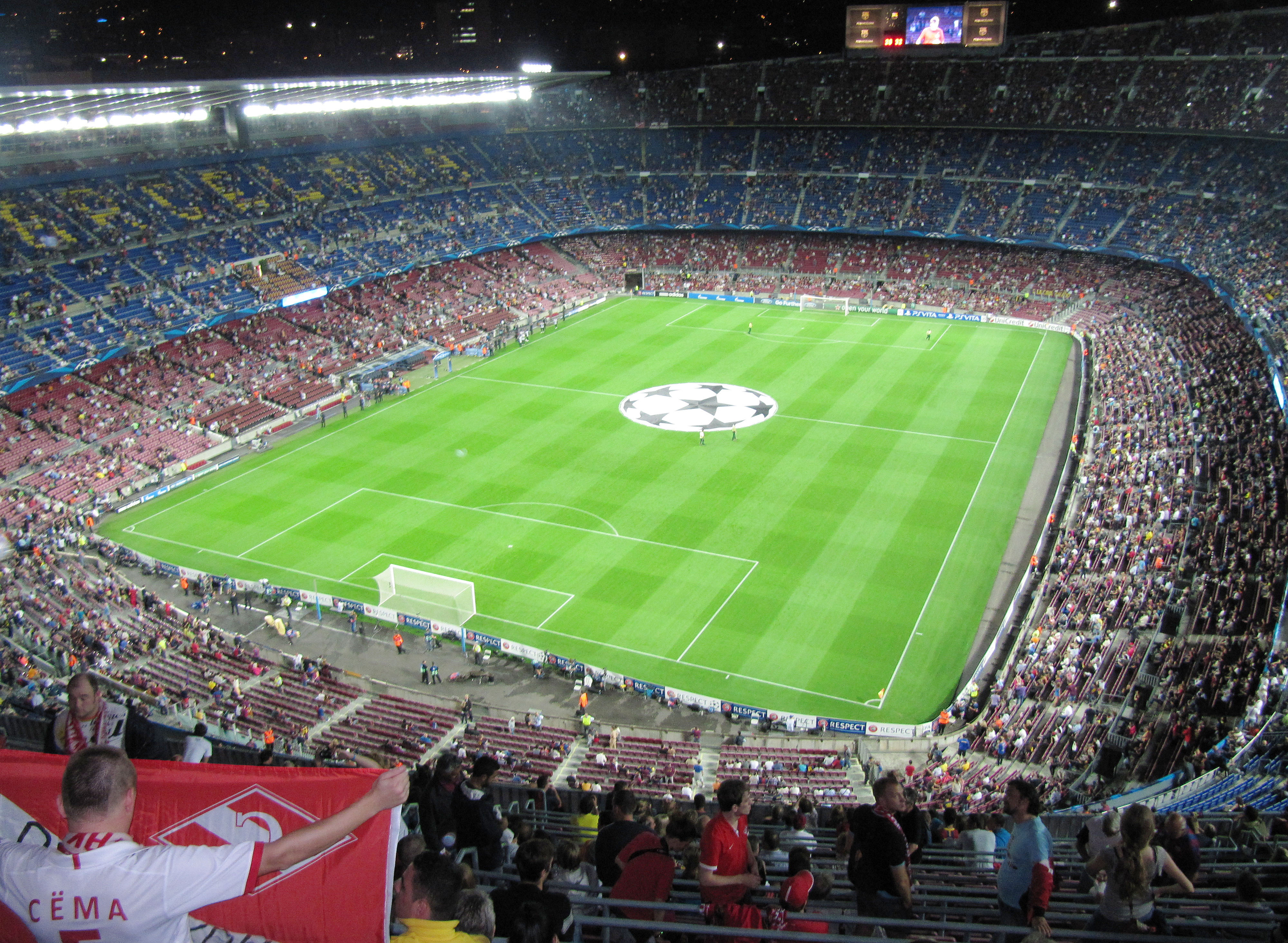
- Camp Nou in Barcelona hosted the final.

Tournament details
- Dates: 6 September 1988 – 24 May 1989
- Teams: 31

Final positions
- Champions: (Italy) AC Milan (3rd title)
- Runners-up: (Romania) Steaua București

Tournament statistics
- Matches played: 59
- Goals scored: 170 (2.88 per match)
- Attendance: 1,773,922 (30,066 per match)
- Top scorer(s): Marco van Basten (Milan); 10 goals

The 1988–89 European Cup was the 34th season of the European Cup football club tournament. The competition was won by Milan, the first time since 1969 and third time overall, comfortably defeated former winners Steaua București in the final.

As the defending champions, PSV Eindhoven received a bye to the second round, but were eliminated by Real Madrid in the quarter-finals. English clubs were still banned, following the Heysel Stadium disaster of 1985, so Liverpool were denied a place in the competition.

== Teams ==
(Albania) 17 Nëntori (1st)	(Austria) Rapid Wien (1st)	(Belgium) Club Brugge (1st)	(Bulgaria) Vitosha Sofia (1st)
(Cyprus) Pezoporikos Larnaca (1st)	(Czechoslovakia) Sparta Prague (1st)	(Denmark) Brøndby (1st)	(Finland) HJK (1st)
(France) Monaco (1st)	(East Germany) BFC Dynamo (1st)	(West Germany) Werder Bremen (1st)	(Greece) AEL (1st)
(Hungary) Budapesti Honvéd (1st)	(Iceland) Valur (1st)	(Republic of Ireland) Dundalk (1st)	(Italy) Milan (1st)
(Luxembourg) Jeunesse Esch (1st)	(Malta) Ħamrun Spartans (1st)	(Netherlands) PSV Eindhoven (1st)^{TH}	(Northern Ireland) Glentoran (1st)
(Norway) Moss (1st)	(Poland) Górnik Zabrze (1st)	(Portugal) Porto (1st)	(Romania) Steaua București (1st)
(Scotland) Celtic (1st)	(Spain) Real Madrid (1st)	(Sweden) IFK Göteborg (1st)	(Switzerland) Neuchâtel Xamax (1st)
(Turkey) Galatasaray (1st)	(Soviet Union) Spartak Moscow (1st)	(Socialist Federal Republic of Yugoslavia) Red Star Belgrade (1st)	

== Bracket ==
First round
(Malta) Ħamrun Spartans	2	0	2
(Albania) 17 Nëntori	1	2	3
(Cyprus) Pezoporikos Larnaca	1	1	2
(Sweden) IFK Göteborg	2	5	7
(Czechoslovakia) Sparta Prague	1	2	3
(Romania) Steaua București	5	2	7
(Soviet Union) Spartak Moscow	2	1	3
(Northern Ireland) Glentoran	0	1	1
(Belgium) Club Brugge (a)	1	1	2
(Denmark) Brøndby	0	2	2
(Iceland) Valur	1	0	1
(France) Monaco	0	2	2
(Greece) AEL	2	1	3 (0)
(Switzerland) Neuchâtel Xamax (p)	1	2	3 (3)
(Austria) Rapid Wien	2	0	2
(Turkey) Galatasaray	1	2	3
(Portugal) Porto	3	0	3
(Finland) HJK	0	2	2
(Poland) Górnik Zabrze	3	4	7
(Luxembourg) Jeunesse Esch	0	1	1
(Spain) Real Madrid	3	1	4
(Norway) Moss	0	0	0
(Hungary) Budapest Honvéd	1	0	1
(Scotland) Celtic	0	4	4
(East Germany) BFC Dynamo	3	0	3
(West Germany) Werder Bremen	0	5	5
(Bulgaria) Vitosha Sofia	0	2	2
(Italy) Milan	2	5	7
(Republic of Ireland) Dundalk	0	0	0
(Socialist Federal Republic of Yugoslavia) Red Star Belgrade	5	3	8

Second round
(Albania) 17 Nëntori	0	0	0
(Sweden) IFK Göteborg	3	1	4
(Romania) Steaua București	3	2	5
(Soviet Union) Spartak Moscow	0	1	1
(Belgium) Club Brugge	1	1	2
(France) Monaco	0	6	6
(Switzerland) Neuchâtel Xamax	3	0	3
(Turkey) Galatasaray	0	5	5
(Netherlands) PSV Eindhoven	5	0	5
(Portugal) Porto	0	2	2
(Poland) Górnik Zabrze	0	2	2
(Spain) Real Madrid	1	3	4
(Scotland) Celtic	0	0	0
(West Germany) Werder Bremen	1	0	1
(Italy) Milan (p)	1	1	2 (4)
(Socialist Federal Republic of Yugoslavia) Red Star Belgrade	1	1	2 (2)

Quarter-finals
(Sweden) IFK Göteborg	1	1	2
(Romania) Steaua București	0	5	5
(France) Monaco	0	1	1
(Turkey) Galatasaray	1	1	2
(Netherlands) PSV Eindhoven	1	1	2
(Spain) Real Madrid	1	2	3
(West Germany) Werder Bremen	0	0	0
(Italy) Milan	0	1	1

Semi-finals
(Romania) Steaua București	4	1	5
(Turkey) Galatasaray	0	1	1
(Spain) Real Madrid	1	0	1
(Italy) Milan	1	5	6

Final
(Romania) Steaua București	0
(Italy) Milan	4

== First round ==
Team 1	Agg.	Team 2	1st leg	2nd leg
Porto (Portugal)	3–2	(Finland) HJK	3–0	0–2
Górnik Zabrze (Poland)	7–1	(Luxembourg) Jeunesse Esch	3–0	4–1
Real Madrid (Spain)	4–0	(Norway) Moss	3–0	1–0
Budapesti Honvéd (Hungary)	1–4	(Scotland) Celtic	1–0	0–4
BFC Dynamo (East Germany)	3–5	(West Germany) Werder Bremen	3–0	0–5
Vitosha Sofia (Bulgaria)	2–7	(Italy) Milan	0–2	2–5
Dundalk (Republic of Ireland)	0–8	(Socialist Federal Republic of Yugoslavia) Red Star Belgrade	0–5	0–3
Ħamrun Spartans (Malta)	2–3	(Albania) 17 Nëntori	2–1	0–2
Pezoporikos Larnaca (Cyprus)	2–7	(Sweden) IFK Göteborg	1–2	1–5
Sparta Prague (Czechoslovakia)	3–7	(Romania) Steaua București	1–5	2–2
Spartak Moscow (Soviet Union)	3–1	(Northern Ireland) Glentoran	2–0	1–1
Club Brugge (Belgium)	2–2 (a)	(Denmark) Brøndby	1–0	1–2
Valur (Iceland)	1–2	(France) Monaco	1–0	0–2
AEL (Greece)	3–3 (0–3 p)	(Switzerland) Neuchâtel Xamax	2–1	1–2
Rapid Wien (Austria)	2–3	(Turkey) Galatasaray	2–1	0–2

As defending champions, and due to the ban on English clubs in UEFA competition after the Heysel Stadium disaster reducing the number of teams in the competition, PSV Eindhoven were given a bye to the second round.

=== First leg ===
6 September 1988
20:00

BFC Dynamo (East Germany)	3–0	(West Germany) Werder Bremen
Doll 16'; Thom 62'; Pastor 77'	Report

Friedrich-Ludwig-Jahn-Stadion, East Berlin
Attendance: 24,000
Referee: Marcel Van Langenhove (Belgium)

6 September 1988
18:30

Valur (Iceland)	1–0	(France) Monaco
Eðvaldsson 55'	Report

Laugardalsvöllur, Reykjavík
Attendance: 5,000
Referee: Thorbjørn Aas (Norway)

7 September 1988
22:30

Porto (Portugal)	3–0	(Finland) HJK
Madjer 6'; Sousa 22'; Águas 75'	Report

Estádio das Antas, Porto
Attendance: 45,000
Referee: Roger Philippi (Luxembourg)

7 September 1988
17:30

Górnik Zabrze (Poland)	3–0	(Luxembourg) Jeunesse Esch
Warzycha 33'; Urban 45', 73'	Report

Stadion Zabrze, Zabrze
Attendance: 13,120
Referee: Vadim Zhuk (Soviet Union)

7 September 1988
21:00

Real Madrid (Spain)	3–0	(Norway) Moss
Losada 20'; Tendillo 29'; Butragueño 32'	Report

Santiago Bernabéu Stadium, Madrid
Attendance: 66,250
Referee: Charles Scerri (Malta)

7 September 1988
19:00

Budapesti Honvéd (Hungary)	1–0	(Scotland) Celtic
Fodor 8'	Report

Bozsik József Stadion, Budapest
Attendance: 8,000
Referee: Ignace van Swieten (Netherlands)

7 September 1988
19:30

Vitosha Sofia (Bulgaria)	0–2	(Italy) Milan
	Report	Virdis 18'; Gullit 75'

Vasil Levski National Stadium, Sofia
Attendance: 30,000
Referee: Gerasimos Germanakos (Greece)

7 September 1988
20:30

Dundalk (Republic of Ireland)	0–5	(Socialist Federal Republic of Yugoslavia) Red Star Belgrade
	Report	Mrkela 50'; Musemić 60'; Stojković 63' (pen.); Stošić 86'; Đurović 88'

Oriel Park, Dundalk
Attendance: 3,206
Referee: Jim McCluskey (Scotland)

7 September 1988
16:45

Ħamrun Spartans (Malta)	2–1	(Albania) 17 Nëntori
Refalo 46', 90'	Report	Stoja 5'

National Stadium, Ta' Qali, Attard
Attendance: 5,250
Referee: Dragiša Komadinić (Yugoslavia)

7 September 1988
16:00

Pezoporikos Larnaca (Cyprus)	1–2	(Sweden) IFK Göteborg
Livathinos 21' (pen.)	Report	Eriksson 17'; Ravelli 57'

GSZ Stadium, Larnaca
Attendance: 5,500
Referee: Borislav Aleksandrov (Bulgaria)

7 September 1988
17:00

Sparta Prague (Czechoslovakia)	1–5	(Romania) Steaua București
Kukleta 20'	Report	Lăcătuș 29', 45'; Hagi 78', 88'; Stoica 86'

Stadion Letná, Prague
Attendance: 22,296
Referee: Carlos Silva Valente (Portugal)

7 September 1988
17:00

Spartak Moscow (Soviet Union)	2–0	(Northern Ireland) Glentoran
Ivanov 53'; Shalimov 54'	Report

Central Dynamo Stadium, Moscow
Attendance: 33,000
Referee: İhsan Türe (Turkey)

7 September 1988
20:00

Club Brugge (Belgium)	1–0	(Denmark) Brøndby
Bettagno 88'	Report

Olympiastadion, Bruges
Attendance: 19,667
Referee: Antal Hutak (Hungary)

7 September 1988
16:00

AEL (Greece)	2–1	(Switzerland) Neuchâtel Xamax
Agorogiannis 5'; Mitsibonas 90'	Report	Hermann 59'

Alcazar Stadium, Larissa
Attendance: 9,717
Referee: Karl-Josef Assenmacher (West Germany)

7 September 1988
19:30

Rapid Wien (Austria)	2–1	(Turkey) Galatasaray
Kranjčar 32'; Kienast 51'	Report	Demiral 81'

Gerhard-Hanappi-Stadion, Vienna
Attendance: 14,500
Referee: Emilio Soriano Aladrén (Spain)

=== Second leg ===
4 October 1988

Monaco (France)	2–0	(Iceland) Valur
Baldursson 15' (o.g.); Weah 38'	Report

Stade Louis II, Monaco
Attendance: 6,383
Referee: Jean-Pierre Schön (Luxembourg)

Monaco won 2–1 on aggregate.

5 October 1988

HJK (Finland)	2–0	(Portugal) Porto
Valla 60'; Kanerva 85'	Report

Olympiastadion, Helsinki
Attendance: 6,243
Referee: Jozef Marko (Czechoslovakia)

Porto won 3–2 on aggregate.

5 October 1988

Jeunesse Esch (Luxembourg)	1–4	(Poland) Górnik Zabrze
Theis 32'	Report	Komornicki 6', 30'; Urban 67'; Zagórski 83'

Stade de la Frontière, Esch-sur-Alzette
Attendance: 960
Referee: Eysteinn Guðmundsson (Iceland)

Górnik Zabrze won 7–1 on aggregate.

5 October 1988

Moss (Norway)	0–1	(Spain) Real Madrid
	Report	Butragueño 39'

Melløs Stadion, Moss
Attendance: 5,415
Referee: Eero Aho (Finland)

Real Madrid won 4–0 on aggregate.

5 October 1988

Celtic (Scotland)	4–0	(Hungary) Budapesti Honvéd
Stark 15'; Walker 77'; McAvennie 80'; McGhee 89'	Report

Celtic Park, Glasgow
Attendance: 42,763
Referee: Erik Fredriksson (Sweden)

Celtic won 4–1 on aggregate.

5 October 1988

Red Star Belgrade (Socialist Federal Republic of Yugoslavia)	3–0	(Republic of Ireland) Dundalk
Šabanadžović 4'; Mrkela 51'; Savićević 67'	Report

Marakana, Belgrade
Attendance: 10,816
Referee: Sadık Deda (Turkey)

Red Star Belgrade won 8–0 on aggregate.

5 October 1988

17 Nëntori (Albania)	2–0	(Malta) Ħamrun Spartans
Hodja 66'; Josa 69'	Report

Qemal Stafa Stadium, Tirana
Attendance: 19,250
Referee: Ștefan Petrescu (Romania)

17 Nëntori won 3–2 on aggregate.

5 October 1988

IFK Göteborg (Sweden)	5–1	(Cyprus) Pezoporikos Larnaca
R. Nilsson 6'; Zetterlund 8'; Holmgren 27'; Fröberg 44', 54'	Report	Livathinos 39'

Ullevi, Gothenburg
Attendance: 6,442
Referee: Janusz Eksztajn (Poland)

IFK Göteborg won 7–2 on aggregate.

5 October 1988

Steaua București (Romania)	2–2	(Czechoslovakia) Sparta Prague
Hagi 39'; Lăcătuș 78'	Report	Bílek 12', 88'

Stadionul Steaua, Bucharest
Attendance: 25,000
Referee: Dieter Pauly (West Germany)

Steaua București won 7–3 on aggregate.

5 October 1988

Glentoran (Northern Ireland)	1–1	(Soviet Union) Spartak Moscow
Moore 48'	Report	Cherenkov 89'

The Oval, Belfast
Attendance: 7,000
Referee: Oli Olsen (Iceland)

Spartak Moscow won 3–1 on aggregate.

5 October 1988

Brøndby (Denmark)	2–1	(Belgium) Club Brugge
Frank 36'; Christensen 68'	Report	Brylle 80'

Brøndby Stadion, Brøndbyvester
Attendance: 14,105
Referee: Alan Snoddy (Northern Ireland)

2–2 on aggregate; Club Brugge won on away goals.

5 October 1988

Neuchâtel Xamax (Switzerland)	2–1 (a.e.t.)	(Greece) AEL
Lei-Ravello 61' (pen.); Lüthi 71'	Report	Karapialis 59'
Penalties
Hermann (penalty scored); Lei-Ravello (penalty scored); Decastel (penalty scored)	3–0	(penalty missed) Mitsibonas; (penalty missed) Bannon; (penalty missed) Tsiolis

Stade de la Maladière, Neuchâtel
Attendance: 12,200
Referee: Rosario Lo Bello (Italy)

3–3 on aggregate; Neuchâtel Xamax won on penalties.

5 October 1988

Galatasaray (Turkey)	2–0	(Austria) Rapid Wien
Tanju 53'; Cüneyt 67'	Report

Ali Sami Yen Stadium, Istanbul
Attendance: 37,500
Referee: George Courtney (England)

Galatasaray won 3–2 on aggregate.

6 October 1988

Milan (Italy)	5–2	(Bulgaria) Vitosha Sofia
Van Basten 2', 13', 43', 84'; Virdis 64'	Report	Nachev 29'; Iliev 74'

San Siro, Milan
Attendance: 53,086
Referee: Joe Worrall (England)

Milan won 7–2 on aggregate.

11 October 1988

Werder Bremen (West Germany)	5–0	(East Germany) BFC Dynamo
Kutzop 22' (pen.); Hermann 55'; Riedle 62'; Burgsmüller 71'; Schaaf 90'	Report

Weserstadion, Bremen
Attendance: 23,542
Referee: Joël Quiniou (France)

Werder Bremen won 5–3 on aggregate.

== Second round ==
Team 1	Agg.	Team 2	1st leg	2nd leg
PSV Eindhoven (Netherlands)	5–2	(Portugal) Porto	5–0	0–2
Górnik Zabrze (Poland)	2–4	(Spain) Real Madrid	0–1	2–3
Celtic (Scotland)	0–1	(West Germany) Werder Bremen	0–1	0–0
Milan (Italy)	2–2 (4–2 p)	(Socialist Federal Republic of Yugoslavia) Red Star Belgrade	1–1	1–1^{1}
17 Nëntori (Albania)	0–4	(Sweden) IFK Göteborg	0–3	0–1
Steaua București (Romania)	5–1	(Soviet Union) Spartak Moscow	3–0	2–1
Club Brugge (Belgium)	2–6	(France) Monaco	1–0	1–6
Neuchâtel Xamax (Switzerland)	3–5	(Turkey) Galatasaray	3–0	0–5

^{1} The second leg in Belgrade was replayed. The original second leg match in Belgrade was stopped by West German referee Dieter Pauly due to thick fog with Red Star leading 1–0. The result was then annulled and a replay took place the very next day. The replay ended in the above 1–1 scoreline.

=== First leg ===
26 October 1988

PSV Eindhoven (Netherlands)	5–0	(Portugal) Porto
Kieft 15'; Ellerman 37'; Koeman 42', 52'; Janssen 48'	Report

Philips Sportpark, Eindhoven
Attendance: 25,500
Referee: Gérard Biguet (France)

26 October 1988

Górnik Zabrze (Poland)	0–1	(Spain) Real Madrid
	Report	Sánchez 64' (pen.)

Stadion Śląski, Chorzów
Attendance: 62,500
Referee: Horst Brummeier (Austria)

26 October 1988

Celtic (Scotland)	0–1	(West Germany) Werder Bremen
	Report	Wolter 57'

Celtic Park, Glasgow
Attendance: 50,624
Referee: Emilio Soriano Aladrén (Spain)

26 October 1988

Milan (Italy)	1–1	(Socialist Federal Republic of Yugoslavia) Red Star Belgrade
Virdis 48'	Report	Stojković 47'

San Siro, Milan
Attendance: 71,316
Referee: Siegfried Kirschen (East Germany)

26 October 1988

17 Nëntori (Albania)	0–3	(Sweden) IFK Göteborg
	Report	Forsberg 32'; Ingesson 36'; L. Nilsson 82'

Qemal Stafa Stadium, Tirana
Attendance: 19,000
Referee: Ivan Gregr (Czechoslovakia)

26 October 1988

Steaua București (Romania)	3–0	(Soviet Union) Spartak Moscow
Dumitrescu 33'; Hagi 58', 70' (pen.)	Report

Stadionul Steaua, Bucharest
Attendance: 27,000
Referee: Rosario Lo Bello (Italy)

26 October 1988

Club Brugge (Belgium)	1–0	(France) Monaco
Mbuyu 48'	Report

Olympiastadion, Bruges
Attendance: 21,000
Referee: Helmut Kohl (Austria)

26 October 1988

Neuchâtel Xamax (Switzerland)	3–0	(Turkey) Galatasaray
Lüthi 55'; Chassot 87'; Decastel 90'	Report

Stade de la Maladière, Neuchâtel
Attendance: 23,000
Referee: Henning Lund-Sørensen (Denmark)

=== Second leg ===
8 November 1988

Werder Bremen (West Germany)	0–0	(Scotland) Celtic
	Report

Weserstadion, Bremen
Attendance: 38,980
Referee: Carlo Longhi (Italy)

Werder Bremen won 1–0 on aggregate.

9 November 1988

Porto (Portugal)	2–0	(Netherlands) PSV Eindhoven
Águas 44'; Domingos 82'	Report

Estádio das Antas, Porto
Attendance: 19,500
Referee: George Courtney (England)

PSV Eindhoven won 5–2 on aggregate.

9 November 1988

Red Star Belgrade (Socialist Federal Republic of Yugoslavia)	1–0	(Italy) Milan
Savićević 50'	Report

Marakana, Belgrade
Attendance: 71,212
Referee: Dieter Pauly (West Germany)

The match was abandoned in the 57th minute because of dense fog and low visibility with the score at 1–0. It was then voided and a full match replay was ordered for the following day with a 15:00 CET starting time. Furthermore, the replay was to begin with the same starting line-ups as the abandoned match, with the exception of Milan players Pietro Paolo Virdis and Carlo Ancelotti; Virdis had been sent off in the abandoned match, while Ancelotti picked up his second yellow card of the competition, meaning that he had to sit out a match.

10 November 1988

Red Star Belgrade (Socialist Federal Republic of Yugoslavia)	1–1 (a.e.t.)	(Italy) Milan
Stojković 39'	Report	Van Basten 35'
Penalties
Stojković (penalty scored); Prosinečki (penalty scored); Savićević (penalty missed); Mrkela (penalty missed)	2–4	(penalty scored) Baresi; (penalty scored) Van Basten; (penalty scored) Evani; (penalty scored) Rijkaard

Marakana, Belgrade
Attendance: 65,500
Referee: Dieter Pauly (West Germany)

2–2 on aggregate; Milan won on penalties.

9 November 1988

IFK Göteborg (Sweden)	1–0	(Albania) 17 Nëntori
Forsberg 30'	Report

Ullevi, Gothenburg
Attendance: 4,434
Referee: George Smith (Scotland)

IFK Göteborg won 4–0 on aggregate.

9 November 1988

Spartak Moscow (Soviet Union)	1–2	(Romania) Steaua București
Cherenkov 44'	Report	Lăcătuș 11'; Balint 89'

Central Lenin Stadium, Moscow
Attendance: 22,000
Referee: Werner Föckler (West Germany)

Steaua București won 5–1 on aggregate.

9 November 1988

Monaco (France)	6–1	(Belgium) Club Brugge
Fofana 5', 26', 73'; Sonor 8'; Touré 24', 30'	Report	Audoor 62'

Stade Louis II, Monaco
Attendance: 12,729
Referee: Bruno Galler (Switzerland)

Monaco won 6–2 on aggregate.

9 November 1988

Galatasaray (Turkey)	5–0	(Switzerland) Neuchâtel Xamax
Uğur 18', 76'; Tanju 55', 78', 84'	Report

Ali Sami Yen Stadium, Istanbul
Attendance: 35,149
Referee: Joël Quiniou (France)

Galatasaray won 5–3 on aggregate.

10 November 1988

Real Madrid (Spain)	3–2	(Poland) Górnik Zabrze
Sánchez 27', 84'; Butragueño 77'	Report	Jegor 41'; Baran 54'

Santiago Bernabéu Stadium, Madrid
Attendance: 37,500
Referee: Joe Worrall (England)

Real Madrid won 4–2 on aggregate.

== Quarter-finals ==
Team 1	Agg.	Team 2	1st leg	2nd leg
PSV Eindhoven (Netherlands)	2–3	(Spain) Real Madrid	1–1	1–2
Werder Bremen (West Germany)	0–1	(Italy) Milan	0–0	0–1
IFK Göteborg (Sweden)	2–5	(Romania) Steaua București	1–0	1–5
Monaco (France)	1–2	(Turkey) Galatasaray	0–1	1–1

=== First leg ===
1 March 1989

PSV Eindhoven (Netherlands)	1–1	(Spain) Real Madrid
Romário 53'	Report	Butragueño 45'

Philips Sportpark, Eindhoven
Attendance: 27,500
Referee: Luigi Agnolin (Italy)

1 March 1989

Werder Bremen (West Germany)	0–0	(Italy) Milan
	Report

Weserstadion, Bremen
Attendance: 39,090
Referee: José Rosa dos Santos (Portugal)

1 March 1989

IFK Göteborg (Sweden)	1–0	(Romania) Steaua București
Ingesson 54'	Report

Ullevi, Gothenburg
Attendance: 16,067
Referee: John Blankenstein (Netherlands)

1 March 1989

Monaco (France)	0–1	(Turkey) Galatasaray
	Report	Tanju 19'

Stade Louis II, Monaco
Attendance: 16,000
Referee: Dieter Pauly (West Germany)

=== Second leg ===
15 March 1989

Real Madrid (Spain)	2–1 (a.e.t.)	(Netherlands) PSV Eindhoven
Sánchez 72' (pen.); Martín Vázquez 105'	Report	Romário 84'

Santiago Bernabéu Stadium, Madrid
Attendance: 95,000
Referee: Michel Vautrot (France)

Real Madrid won 3–2 on aggregate.

15 March 1989

Milan (Italy)	1–0	(West Germany) Werder Bremen
Van Basten 31' (pen.)	Report

San Siro, Milan
Attendance: 71,207
Referee: George Smith (Scotland)

Milan won 1–0 on aggregate.

15 March 1989

Steaua București (Romania)	5–1	(Sweden) IFK Göteborg
Lăcătuș 7', 16', 65'; Dumitrescu 39'; Balint 90'	Report	Zetterlund 53'

Stadionul Steaua, Bucharest
Attendance: 23,000
Referee: Joël Quiniou (France)

Steaua București won 5–2 on aggregate.

15 March 1989

Galatasaray (Turkey)	1–1	(France) Monaco
Prekazi 51'	Report	Weah 65'

Müngersdorfer Stadion, Cologne
Attendance: 60,000
Referee: Marcel Van Langenhove (Belgium)

Galatasaray won 2–1 on aggregate.

== Semi-finals ==
Team 1	Agg.	Team 2	1st leg	2nd leg
Real Madrid (Spain)	1–6	(Italy) Milan	1–1	0–5
Steaua București (Romania)	5–1	(Turkey) Galatasaray	4–0	1–1

=== First leg ===
5 April 1989

Real Madrid (Spain)	1–1	(Italy) Milan
Sánchez 41'	Report	Van Basten 74'

Santiago Bernabéu Stadium, Madrid
Attendance: 85,500
Referee: Erik Fredriksson (Sweden)

5 April 1989

Steaua București (Romania)	4–0	(Turkey) Galatasaray
Dumitrescu 8'; Hagi 39' (pen.); Petrescu 68'; Balint 71'	Report

Stadionul Steaua, Bucharest
Attendance: 21,161
Referee: Vítor Fernandes Correia (Portugal)

=== Second leg ===
19 April 1989

Milan (Italy)	5–0	(Spain) Real Madrid
Ancelotti 18'; Rijkaard 25'; Gullit 45'; Van Basten 49'; Donadoni 59'	Report

San Siro, Milan
Attendance: 73,112
Referee: Alexis Ponnet (Belgium)

Milan won 6–1 on aggregate.

19 April 1989

Galatasaray (Turkey)	1–1	(Romania) Steaua București
Cüneyt 36'	Report	Dumitrescu 39'

İzmir Atatürk Stadium, İzmir
Attendance: 35,000
Referee: Keith Hackett (England)

Steaua București won 5–1 on aggregate.

== Final ==
24 May 1989

Steaua București (Romania)	0–4	(Italy) Milan
	Report	Gullit 18', 38'; Van Basten 28', 46'

Camp Nou, Barcelona
Attendance: 97,000
Referee: Karl-Heinz Tritschler (West Germany)

== Top goalscorers ==
Rank	Name	Team	Goals
1	(Netherlands) Marco van Basten	(Italy) Milan	10
2	(Romania) Marius Lăcătuș	(Romania) Steaua București	7
3	(Romania) Gheorghe Hagi	(Romania) Steaua București	6
4	(Turkey) Tanju Çolak	(Turkey) Galatasaray	5
4	(Mexico) Hugo Sánchez	(Spain) Real Madrid	5
6	(Romania) Ilie Dumitrescu	(Romania) Steaua București	4
6	(Spain) Emilio Butragueño	(Spain) Real Madrid	4
6	(Netherlands) Ruud Gullit	(Italy) Milan	4
9	(Romania) Gabi Balint	(Romania) Steaua București	3
9	(Ivory Coast) Youssouf Falikou Fofana	(France) Monaco	3
9	(Socialist Federal Republic of Yugoslavia) Dragan Stojković	(Socialist Federal Republic of Yugoslavia) Red Star Belgrade	3
9	(Poland) Jan Urban	(Poland) Górnik Zabrze	3
9	(Italy) Pietro Paolo Virdis	(Italy) Milan	3

== See also ==
- 1988–89 European Cup Winners' Cup
- 1988–89 UEFA Cup
