= Niinimäki =

Niinimäki is a Finnish-language surname. Notable people with the surname include:

- Jari Niinimäki (1957–2023), Finnish footballer
- Jesse Niinimäki (born 1983), Finnish ice hockey player
- Markku Niinimäki, Finnish Paralympic athlete
- Tom Niinimäki (born 1982), Finnish mixed martial artist
