= Noel Larkin =

Irish footballer

Personal information
- Date of birth: 6 January 1955 (age 71)
- Place of birth: Athlone, Ireland
- Position: Forward

Senior career*
Years	Team	Apps	(Gls)
1971–1984	Athlone Town	232	(48)
1984–1988	Shamrock Rovers	95	(34)
1988–1989	Derry City	27	(7)

International career
1982–1988	League of Ireland XI	?	(3)
- * Club domestic league appearances and goals

Noel Larkin (born 6 January 1955) is an Irish former footballer who played for Athlone Town, Shamrock Rovers and Derry City.

== Biography ==
Larkin made his League of Ireland debut in 1971 at Tolka Park against Shelbourne as a left back. His versatility was a major plus for his hometown club as in his thirteen years at St Mel's Park, he played in every outfield position. Larkin won the League of Ireland twice and the League of Ireland Cup three times with his home club.

At the age of 19, he also represented the club in the European Cup and memorably in the UEFA Cup against AC Milan in 1975. Larkin described his experience of playing at the famed San Siro:

It was some experience. The San Siro was full and it was very frightening. We walked out on the pitch before the game and loads of flares started shooting down from the stands. We had never come across this type of fanaticism before. It was a bit scary. We had also received lots of bad press from the Italian media because they felt we kicked their players too hard in Athlone. So there was quite a bit of bad feeling toward us. The fact our jerseys were the same colour as Inter Milan, their biggest rivals, seemed to annoy them even more! We played exceptionally well though and held them scoreless for most of the game. I think we conceded three in the last 20 minutes or so. We just caved in a bit. I played in the middle of midfield that night and marked Gianni Rivera, he was Italy's World Cup captain and was making his Milan return that night. That's why there was so many people in the stadium. He is a Milan legend. He came up to me after the game and told me I played well. That was nice and I'll never forget it.

He finished the 1982–83 season as top goalscorer with 18 league goals, which won him the Personality of the Year award.

Larkin joined Shamrock Rovers in November 1984, having decided to retire a few weeks, before only for a phone call from Jim McLaughlin which changed his mind. He made his debut on 18 November in a 2–0 win over Home Farm. Two weeks later, he scored on his home debut at Milltown in a 4–0 hammering of St Patrick's Athletic. He went on to score 11 goals (8 league and 3 FAI Cup) that season as Rovers won the double. The best remembered was his winning goal in the Cup Final win against Galway United.

In the 1985–86 season, he scored 13 goals in all competitions as Rovers again won the double with Larkin scoring a memorable header in Rovers' 1–0 win over Arsenal. In the 1986–87 season, Larkin scored a total of seventeen goals in all competitions as Rovers completed a treble double. He also scored for the League of Ireland in a 2–1 defeat to the Irish League on St Patrick's Day. The following night, Rovers played Manchester United and Larkin played and scored with a diving header as Rovers notched up their second victory over their glamorous opponents in the same season. Larkin scored in the Cup final with a great 20-yard drive. Despite interest from AS Monaco, Larkin stayed with Rovers.

The following season was a disaster for the club as Glenmalure Park was put up for sale and the owners moved home games to Tolka Park. As Rovers fans boycotted "home" games Larkin's form seemed to suffer as he scored just 11 goals in all competitions. However, these included a hat trick of headers against Bohemians at Dalymount Park. His last game in the green and white was on 8 April 1988 at a near empty Tolka. In total, he played in six European games for the Hoops scoring 34 League goals and 12 in the FAI Cup.

He then joined Derry City, where he scored twice on his debut, and in his one season there he won the domestic treble. Fittingly in his last game in the League of Ireland, he won another Cup medal to bring his total career haul to 15 major trophies, 6 Leagues, 4 FAI Cups, 4 League Cups and 1 Tyler All Ireland Cup as well as other minor medals such as Presidents Cup and Leinster Senior Cup medals. He made over 500 league of Ireland appearances.

Larkin then emigrated to Australia and played for Spearwood Dalmatinac and Stirling Macedonia, winning another League and Cup double before retiring at 38 then coaching until 1998. He currently resides in Brisbane.

He also represented the Irish Olympic side 8 times in the 1988 Summer Olympics qualifiers, scoring in a 2–2 draw with Spain and in a 1–1 draw in France where he captained the team.

== Sources ==
- Paul Doolan; Robert Goggins. The Hoops. ISBN 0-7171-2121-6.
