= 1981–82 Czechoslovak First League =

Czechoslovak First League
- Season: 1981–82
- Champions: Dukla Prague
- Relegated: ZŤS Petržalka; Dukla Banská Bystrica
- European Cup: Dukla Prague
- Cup Winners' Cup: Slovan Bratislava
- UEFA Cup: Baník Ostrava; Bohemians Prague
- Top goalscorer: Peter Herda; Ladislav Vízek (15 goals each)

The 1981–82 Czechoslovak First League was contested by 16 teams, and Dukla Prague won the championship. Peter Herda and Ladislav Vízek were the league's top scorers with 15 goals each.

== Stadia and locations ==
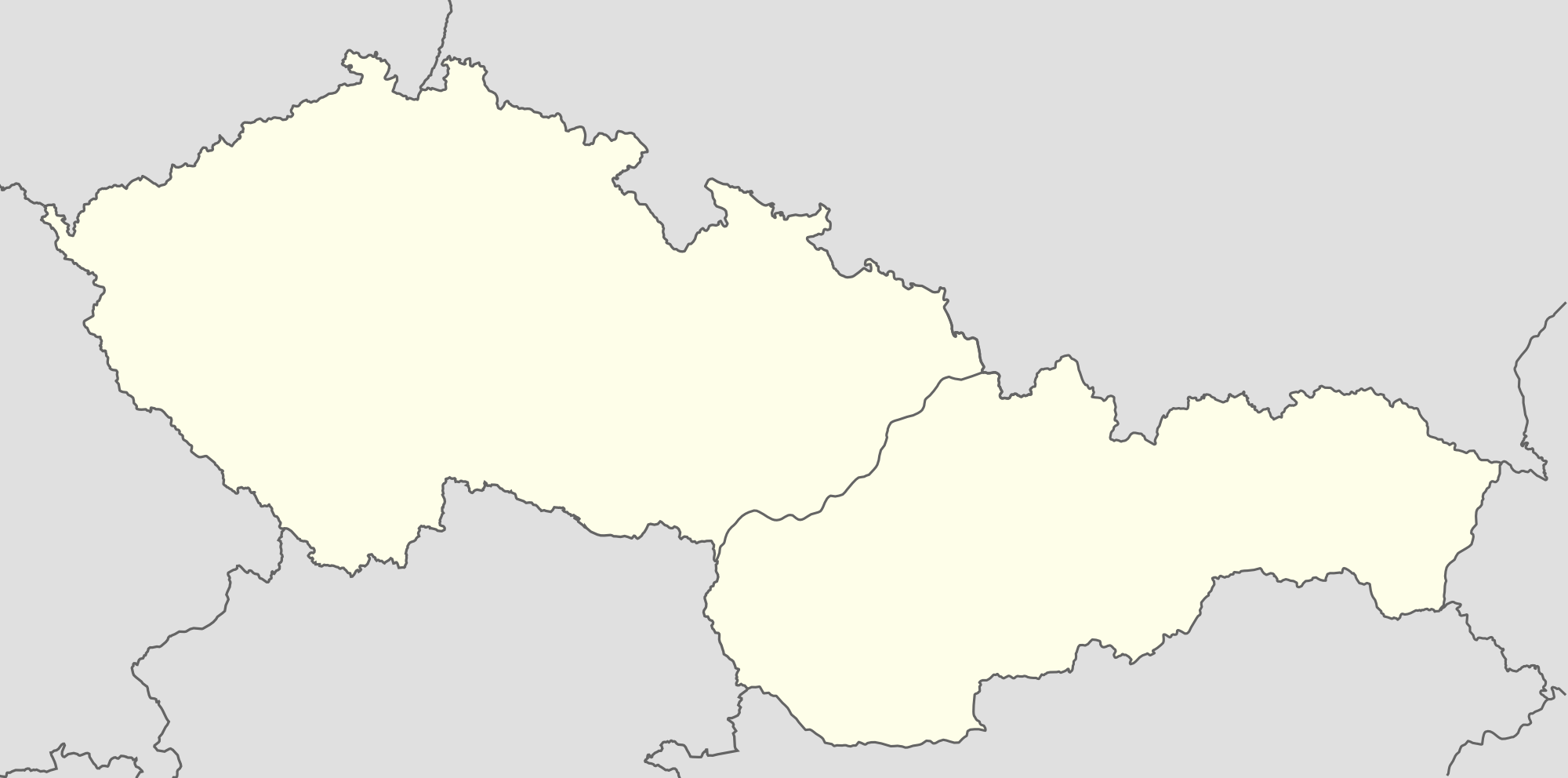
Location of clubs in the 1981–82 Czechoslovak First League

== League standings ==
Pos	Team	Pld	W	D	L	GF	GA	GD	Pts	Qualification or relegation
1	Dukla Prague (C)	30	18	6	6	54	20	+34	42	Qualification for European Cup first round
2	Baník Ostrava	30	15	8	7	53	24	+29	38	Qualification for UEFA Cup first round
3	Bohemians Prague	30	15	8	7	41	22	+19	38	Qualification for UEFA Cup first round
4	Plastika Nitra	30	14	8	8	35	26	+9	36	
5	Lokomotíva Košice	30	12	8	10	36	34	+2	32	
6	Sparta Prague	30	11	9	10	40	35	+5	31	
7	Slavia Prague	30	10	10	10	44	41	+3	30	
8	Inter Bratislava	30	11	8	11	29	29	0	30	
9	Vítkovice	30	11	8	11	33	41	−8	30	
10	Slovan Bratislava	30	11	7	12	42	47	−5	29	Qualification for Cup Winners' Cup first round
11	Zbrojovka Brno	30	11	6	13	32	38	−6	28	
12	Tatran Prešov	30	10	8	12	28	40	−12	28	
13	RH Cheb	30	8	9	13	36	45	−9	25	
14	Spartak Trnava	30	10	4	16	31	41	−10	24	
15	Petržalka (R)	30	8	6	16	26	43	−17	22	Relegation to Slovak National Football League
16	Dukla Banská Bystrica (R)	30	5	7	18	29	63	−34	17	Relegation to Slovak National Football League

Source: rsssf.com
(C) Champions; (R) Relegated

== Results ==
Home \ Away	OST	BOH	BB	DUK	INT	LOK	PET	NIT	CHE	SLA	SLO	SPA	TRN	PRE	VÍT	BRN
Baník Ostrava		2–0	6–1	1–0	4–1	3–2	0–0	0–0	5–1	3–0	3–0	2–1	4–1	2–0	1–0	5–1
Bohemians Prague	1–0		5–1	0–0	1–0	4–0	3–0	2–0	1–0	0–0	3–1	1–1	2–1	3–0	1–0	2–1
Dukla Banská Bystrica	1–1	0–3		0–3	1–0	0–1	1–0	1–1	0–4	0–0	4–1	1–1	2–1	0–1	0–0	1–2
Dukla Prague	1–0	0–0	4–1		4–0	3–0	3–0	3–0	0–0	1–1	1–1	3–1	5–1	1–0	0–1	2–0
Inter Bratislava	2–1	1–0	3–1	1–0		0–0	1–0	2–0	2–2	1–0	0–0	3–0	1–0	0–0	1–2	2–0
Lokomotiva Košice	0–2	3–2	2–1	1–2	0–0		2–0	2–0	1–0	5–1	1–0	0–0	2–1	1–1	0–0	2–0
Petržalka	0–0	3–1	1–1	0–1	1–2	2–1		0–3	3–0	3–1	1–1	3–0	1–0	2–2	2–0	1–0
Plastika Nitra	1–0	0–0	4–0	2–1	2–1	1–0	1–0		4–2	1–1	2–0	1–1	1–0	1–0	0–1	2–0
RH Cheb	2–2	1–0	3–2	2–1	0–0	2–1	5–2	3–4		2–2	1–1	0–1	0–1	2–0	1–1	0–0
Slavia Prague	2–1	2–2	2–2	0–1	1–0	3–3	2–0	2–1	3–1		2–1	0–0	1–0	5–0	6–1	3–0
Slovan ChZJD Bratislava	1–1	2–0	2–0	3–6	3–2	0–1	0–0	2–1	3–0	3–1		2–2	2–1	2–1	2–1	2–0
Sparta Prague	1–2	1–0	4–0	1–3	1–1	2–1	3–0	1–0	0–1	1–1	2–0		3–0	4–0	3–1	2–2
Spartak Trnava	0–0	1–1	3–1	0–1	1–0	0–0	2–0	0–1	1–0	3–2	3–1	2–0		3–2	3–1	0–0
Tatran Prešov	1–0	0–0	1–4	1–0	1–0	1–2	2–0	1–1	0–0	1–0	3–2	4–1	1–0		1–1	0–0
Vítkovice	3–2	0–1	2–1	1–1	1–1	1–1	2–1	0–0	3–1	3–0	2–3	0–2	3–1	1–0		1–0
Zbrojovka Brno	0–0	1–2	2–1	1–3	2–1	2–1	3–0	0–0	1–0	1–0	2–1	1–0	3–1	2–3	5–0	

Source: statistiky1ligy.fotbal.cz
Legend: Blue = home team win; Yellow = draw; Red = away team win.

== Attendances ==
No.	Club	Average
1	Brno	10,198
2	Sparta Praha	8,575
3	Baník Ostrava	8,023
4	Bohemians	6,833
5	Vítkovice	6,648
6	Slavia Praha	5,982
7	Cheb	4,916
8	Petržalka	4,840
9	Nitra	4,796
10	Slovan Bratislava	4,655
11	Spartak Trnava	4,524
12	Košice	3,242
13	Dukla Praha	3,135
14	Tatran Prešov	2,969
15	Inter Bratislava	2,520
16	Dukla Banská Bystrica	2,015
