= 1987–88 Irish League =

Irish League
- Season: 1987–88
- Champions: Glentoran; 18th Irish title
- Matches played: 182
- Goals scored: 458 (2.52 per match)
- Top goalscorer: Martin McGaughey (18 goals)

Location of teams in the Irish League from 1983–1990
Location of Belfast-based teams in the Irish League from 1983–1990

The 1987–88 Irish League was the 87th edition of the Irish League, the highest level of league competition in Northern Irish football. The league consisted of 14 teams, and Glentoran won the championship.

== League standings ==
Pos	Team	Pld	W	D	L	GF	GA	GD	Pts	Qualification
1	Glentoran (C)	26	19	5	2	48	15	+33	62	Qualification for the European Cup first round
2	Linfield	26	19	3	4	51	15	+36	60	Qualification for the UEFA Cup first round
3	Coleraine	26	16	4	6	53	28	+25	52	
4	Newry Town	26	15	5	6	34	22	+12	50	
5	Larne	26	12	4	10	35	35	0	40	
6	Glenavon	26	11	5	10	28	27	+1	38	Qualification for the European Cup Winners' Cup first round
7	Ballymena United	26	9	9	8	34	34	0	36	
8	Portadown	26	10	5	11	31	27	+4	35	
9	Crusaders	26	8	6	12	29	35	−6	30	
10	Cliftonville	26	6	8	12	18	38	−20	26	
11	Ards	26	6	7	13	29	38	−9	25	
12	Bangor	26	7	4	15	24	47	−23	25	
13	Carrick Rangers	26	5	5	16	25	44	−19	20	
14	Distillery	26	3	2	21	19	53	−34	11	

Source: rsssf.com
(C) Champions

== Results ==
Home \ Away	ARD	BAN	BLM	CRK	CLI	COL	CRU	DIS	GLV	GLT	LRN	LIN	NEW	POR
Ards		1–1	0–1	1–2	1–0	1–1	1–2	1–1	1–1	0–2	2–3	1–2	0–1	2–0
Bangor	2–4		1–1	2–1	1–2	0–4	1–1	1–6	3–0	0–1	0–2	0–4	1–0	0–0
Ballymena United	1–1	1–0		1–0	1–1	2–1	0–0	2–1	1–1	3–2	0–1	1–4	3–4	2–1
Carrick Rangers	2–1	0–2	1–2		0–2	0–3	1–2	2–0	0–0	0–2	2–2	1–0	1–1	0–1
Cliftonville	0–0	1–2	1–1	0–2		0–2	0–0	2–0	2–3	1–1	0–2	0–5	1–1	1–0
Coleraine	4–2	2–1	5–5	3–1	3–0		1–1	3–1	1–0	1–2	3–0	1–2	1–3	1–0
Crusaders	3–0	4–1	0–0	2–1	2–0	0–1		3–0	1–2	2–3	1–4	1–3	0–3	1–2
Distillery	1–3	0–1	0–5	1–1	1–2	1–2	2–0		0–1	0–3	2–1	0–1	0–2	1–2
Glenavon	0–1	1–0	1–0	3–2	4–0	3–2	1–0	4–0		1–2	0–1	0–3	0–0	1–2
Glentoran	2–2	3–0	3–0	1–1	1–1	2–2	1–0	1–0	1–0		4–0	0–1	1–0	1–0
Larne	2–0	1–2	1–0	4–1	0–0	0–4	1–2	2–1	1–0	0–3		1–2	5–1	0–0
Linfield	1–0	3–1	3–1	1–0	4–0	0–1	1–1	2–0	3–0	0–2	3–0		1–0	1–1
Newry Town	1–0	1–0	1–0	3–1	1–0	1–0	3–0	3–0	0–0	0–2	0–0	1–0		3–2
Portadown	2–3	3–1	0–0	4–2	0–1	0–1	2–0	3–0	0–1	0–2	2–1	1–1	3–0	

Source: Irish League Archive
Legend: Blue = home team win; Yellow = draw; Red = away team win.
