= Lennart Forsberg =

Swedish footballer (1928–2020)

Personal information
- Date of birth: 28 March 1928
- Date of death: 6 September 2020 (aged 92)
- Position: Left winger

Senior career*
Years	Team	Apps	(Gls)
- GIF Sundsvall
	Djurgården	28	(14)
- * Club domestic league appearances and goals

Lennart Forsberg (28 March 1928 - 6 September 2020) was a Swedish footballer who played as a left winger. Forsberg debuted in 1945 at the age of 17 with GIF Sundsvall. He made 28 Allsvenskan appearances for Djurgården and scored 14 goals.

Lennart Forsberg was the father of footballer Leif Forsberg and grandfather of footballer Emil Forsberg.
