= Kazimierz Sokołowski (footballer) =

Polish footballer

Personal information
- Full name: Kazimierz Stanisław Sokołowski
- Date of birth: 11 February 1963 (age 63)
- Place of birth: Szczecin, Poland
- Height: 1.82 m (6 ft 0 in)
- Position: Defender

Team information
- Current team: Kongsvinger (player developer)

Senior career*
Years	Team	Apps	(Gls)
1980–1990	Pogoń Szczecin	218	(26)
1990–1991	LASK	28	(3)
1992–1994	Tromsø	36	(3)
1995–1997	Asker SK		

International career
- Poland U18
- Poland U20
- Poland U21
1985–1986	Poland	2	(0)

Managerial career
- 1995–2001: Asker
- 2002: Asker women
- 2004: Asker women (assistant)
- 2004: Lyn (player developer)
- 2005: Lyn (caretaker)
- 2005: Lyn (junior coach)
- 2006–2008: Sandefjord (assistant)
- 2008: Sandefjord (caretaker)
- 2009–2012: Vålerenga (developer/assistant)
- 2013: Brann (assistant)
- 2014–2015: Legia Warsaw (assistant)
- 2016–2017: Videoton (assistant)
- 2017–2018: Kongsvinger (assistant)
- 2018: Kongsvinger
- 2018–2019: Stabæk (assistant)
- 2019–2022: Omonia (assistant)
- 2022–2023: Pafos (assistant)
- 2023–2024: AIK (assistant)
- 2025–: Kongsvinger (player developer)
Medal record
Men's football
Representing Poland
UEFA European Under-18 Championship
Runner-up	1981 West Germany
- * Club domestic league appearances and goals

Kazimierz "Kaz" Sokołowski (born 11 February 1963) is a Polish professional football manager and former player who is the current head of player development of Kongsvinger.

== Playing career ==
He was a squad member for the 1980 UEFA European Under-18 Championship and the 1981 FIFA World Youth Championship. He was later capped twice for Poland and upon transferring to Tromsø IL ahead of the 1992 season, he emigrated to Norway. With Sokołowski settling in Asker, his son Tomasz Sokolowski was capped for Norway.

== Managerial career ==
As a head coach Sokołowski led Asker to promotion to the 1996 3. divisjon and the 1999 2. divisjon, and lost promotion to the 2000 1. divisjon only in extra time on the last matchday.

Asker's women's team played in the first tier, and Sokołowski was co-head coach with Eli Landsem in 2002. He returned in 2004 as assistant coach under Tomi Markovski. Both also worked at the Norwegian School of Elite Sport (NTG). In mid-2004, Sokołowski also became player developer in another of NTG's cooperation clubs, Lyn.

In January 2005, Sokołowski became caretaker manager of Lyn, after Lyn's then-manager Espen Olafsen was struck by the 2004 Thailand tsunami, surviving himself but losing family members. In April 2005, Henning Berg was hired as Lyn manager, and Sokołowski left Lyn since his son Tomasz was a squad member. However, Sokołowski would later work as Henning Berg's assistant in several clubs.

After rounding off 2005 in the coaching staff of Lyn's junior team, who became runners-up in the Norwegian U-20 Cup, he became Sandefjord's assistant under Tor Thodesen ahead of the 2006 season.

Thodesen was sacked in May 2008. After being caretaker manager for a couple of weeks, Sokołowski continued as Sandefjord's assistant until joining Vålerenga as player developer ahead of the 2009 season. After suffering a tumor on the adrenal gland, he was hospitalized for an extended time, but returned to work in January 2010 and was especially credited with the development of striker Mohammed Abdellaoue. In the summer of 2013, Sokołowski was tempted to sign for SK Brann as assistant, where his son Tomasz played.

In 2014, Sokołowski started a lengthy tenure as the assistant manager for Henning Berg, first in Legia Warsaw, where the entire Norwegian coaching team was sacked in October 2015, then successively in Videoton, Stabæk, Omonia, Pafos and AIK. In between Videoton and Stabæk, Sokołowski also had a spell in Kongsvinger without Berg. After Henning Berg resigned from AIK in June 2024, Sokołowski continued as assistant under caretaker manager Henok Goitom. Ahead of the 2025 season, however, Sokolowski was announced as the new head of player development in Kongsvinger IL. Expressen conveyed that the move happened for family reasons.

== Honours ==
Poland U18

- UEFA European Under-18 Championship runner-up: 1981
