= Alain Bettagno =

Belgian footballer

Personal information
- Date of birth: 9 November 1968 (age 57)
- Place of birth: Seraing, Belgium
- Positions: Midfielder; winger

Senior career*
Years	Team	Apps	(Gls)
-1988	R.F.C. Seraing		
`1988-1989	Club Brugge KV	6	(0)
-1996	Standard Liège	137+	(31+)
1996-1997	FC Linz	27	(2)
1997-1999	FC Gueugnon	46	(10)
1999-2000	R.A.A. Louviéroise		
2000-2001	RFC Liège		
2002-2002	R.C.S. Verviétois		

International career
1994-1995	Belgium	2	(0)
- * Club domestic league appearances and goals

Alain Bettagno (born 9 November 1968 in Belgium) is a Belgian retired footballer.

He earned two caps with the Belgium national team.

== Career ==
Bettagno started his career with Seraing, the club his father supported, and was one of a few youth graduates from the club. After relegation to the Belgian second division, he stayed with the team on his father's wishes despite offers from the top division. In 1988, he signed for Bruges for twelve million francs, which saved Seraing from bankruptcy. However, his career was blighted by injuries, including one in the 1993 Belgian Cup final, which caused him to miss the 1994 World Cup.
