= Heiko Peschke =

German former footballer (born 1963)

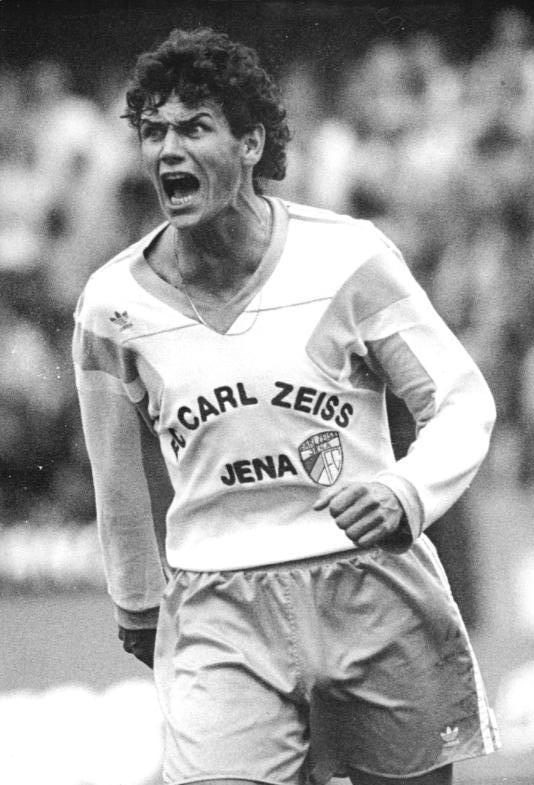
- Peschke with Carl Zeiss Jena in 1990

Personal information
- Date of birth: 18 September 1963 (age 63)
- Place of birth: Riesa, East Germany
- Height: 1.88 m (6 ft 2 in)
- Position: Defender

Youth career
- 1970–1977: BSG Stahl Riesa
- 1977–1981: HFC Chemie

Senior career*
Years	Team	Apps	(Gls)
1981–1983	HFC Chemie	33	(9)
1983–1991	Carl Zeiss Jena	188	(45)
1991–1997	KFC Uerdingen	159	(9)
Total		390	(63)

International career
1990	East Germany	5	(1)
- * Club domestic league appearances and goals

Heiko Peschke (born 18 September 1963) is a German former professional footballer who played as a defender.

He appeared in 288 top-flight matches in Germany - 221 in the Oberliga and 67 in the Bundesliga. He won five caps for East Germany in 1990.
