= Jesse Niinimäki =

Finnish ice hockey player (born 1983)

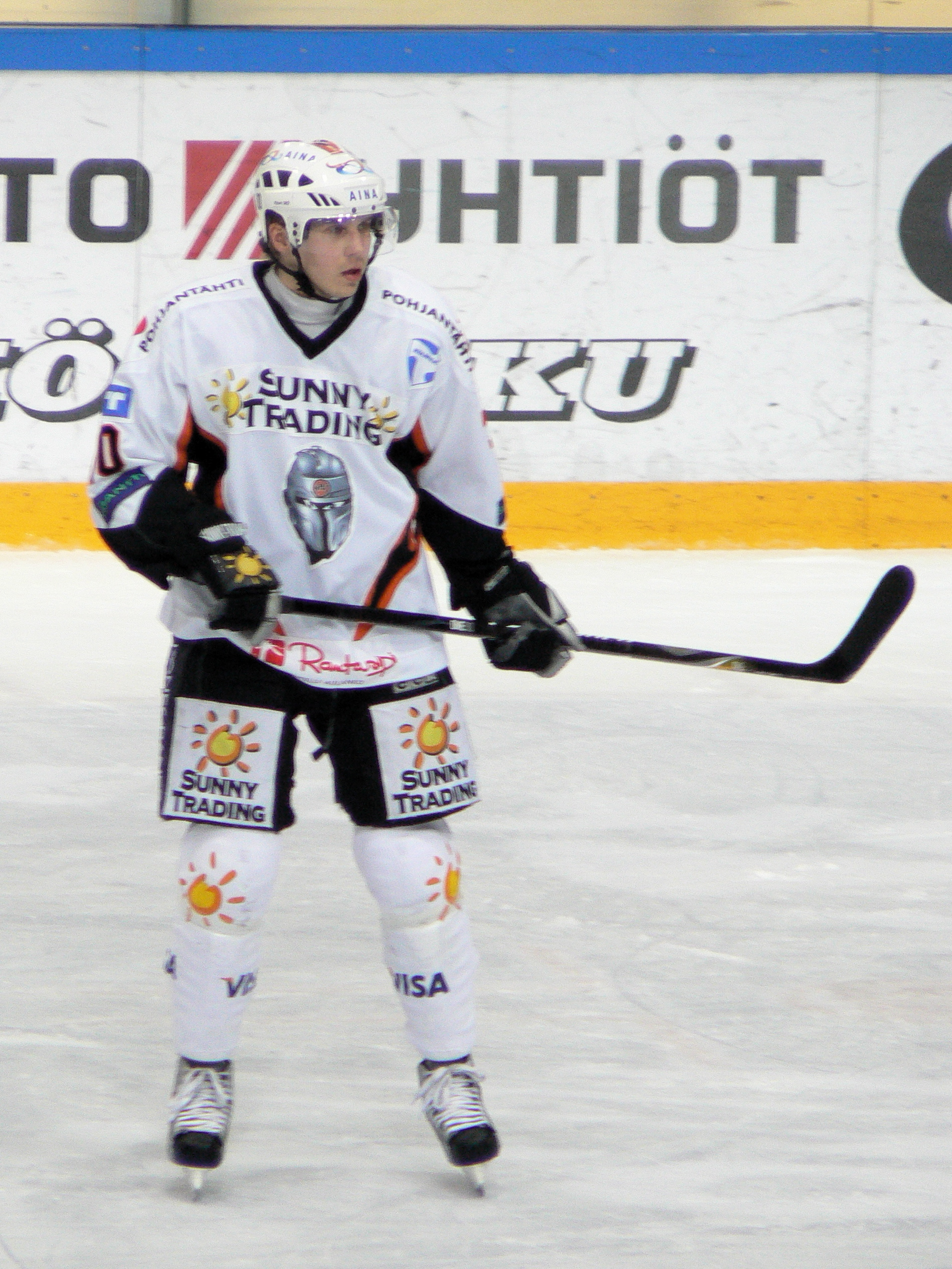
- Born: August 19, 1983 (age 42) Tampere, Finland
- Height: 6 ft 3 in (191 cm)
- Weight: 195 lb (88 kg; 13 st 13 lb)
- Position: Centre
- Shot: Left
- Played for: Ilves; Edmonton Road Runners; Jokerit; JYP Jyväskylä; Luleå HF; Krefeld Pinguine; HC Davos; HPK; HDD Olimpija Ljubljana; Lahti Pelicans; Amur Khabarovsk; Brynäs IF; HC Fassa; Yunost Minsk
- NHL draft: 15th overall, 2002; Edmonton Oilers
- Playing career: 2000–2018

Jesse Niinimäki (born August 19, 1983) is a Finnish former professional ice hockey forward. Niinimäki was selected by the Edmonton Oilers in the first round, 15th overall, of the 2002 NHL entry draft.

== Playing career ==
Niinimäki spent the 2004–05 season with the Edmonton Road Runners in the American Hockey League (AHL) and Ilves, then signed with Jokerit for the 2005–06 season. After a disappointing fall season, Niinimäki was released from his contract with Jokerit in January 2006 and signed by JYP for the rest of the season.

After the 2005–06 season, Niinimäki moved to Sweden and played for Elitserien side Luleå HF in 37 games. Niinimäki also played for Deutsche Eishockey Liga team Krefeld Pinguine. His tenure in Germany lasted for nine regular season and two playoff games. After the 2006–07 season, Niinimäki returned to Luleå HF but was released in September 2007. Niinimäki was acquired by Swiss Nationalliga A team HC Davos, but in January 2008, he returned to HPK.

== Personal life ==
He is the son of former Finnish international footballer, Jari Niinimäki.

== Career statistics ==
=== Regular season and playoffs ===
			Regular season					Playoffs
Season	Team	League	GP	G	A	Pts	PIM	GP	G	A	Pts	PIM
1999–2000	Tappara	FIN U18	14	0	0	0	4	—	—	—	—	—
1999–2000	Ilves	FIN U18	14	0	5	5	6	—	—	—	—	—
2000–01	Ilves	FIN U18	16	3	5	8	40	—	—	—	—	—
2000–01	Ilves	FIN U20	18	2	4	6	6	—	—	—	—	—
2001–02	Ilves	FIN U20	27	9	23	32	54	—	—	—	—	—
2001–02	Ilves	SM-liiga	16	2	4	6	4	3	0	0	0	0
2002–03	Ilves	FIN U20	6	0	3	3	2	—	—	—	—	—
2002–03	Ilves	SM-liiga	41	4	13	17	12	—	—	—	—	—
2002–03	Sport	Mestis	2	0	1	1	10	—	—	—	—	—
2003–04	Ilves	SM-liiga	10	3	3	6	2	—	—	—	—	—
2004–05	Ilves	SM-liiga	18	4	4	8	8	—	—	—	—	—
2004–05	Edmonton Road Runners	AHL	24	1	0	1	2	—	—	—	—	—
2005–06	Jokerit	SM-liiga	34	4	8	12	14	—	—	—	—	—
2005–06	JYP	SM-liiga	19	6	8	14	12	3	0	0	0	0
2006–07	Luleå HF	SEL	37	7	8	15	20	—	—	—	—	—
2006–07	Krefeld Pinguine	DEL	9	4	9	13	4	2	1	0	1	0
2007–08	Luleå HF	SEL	5	0	0	0	0	—	—	—	—	—
2007–08	HC Davos	NLA	5	1	0	1	4	—	—	—	—	—
2007–08	HPK	SM-liiga	17	1	4	5	4	—	—	—	—	—
2008–09	HDD Olimpija Ljubljana	AUT	8	1	1	2	8	—	—	—	—	—
2008–09	LeKi	Mestis	2	1	0	1	0	—	—	—	—	—
2008–09	Ilves	SM-liiga	24	4	2	6	18	3	0	0	0	0
2009–10	Ilves	SM-liiga	55	14	20	34	36	—	—	—	—	—
2009–10	LeKi	Mestis	3	1	2	3	0	—	—	—	—	—
2010–11	Ilves	SM-liiga	57	17	32	49	20	6	1	5	6	2
2011–12	Ilves	SM-liiga	47	5	31	36	20	—	—	—	—	—
2012–13	Ilves	SM-liiga	27	2	9	11	4	—	—	—	—	—
2012–13	Pelicans	SM-liiga	16	2	6	8	6	—	—	—	—	—
2013–14	Pelicans	Liiga	50	9	20	29	14	7	0	2	2	0
2014–15	Amur Khabarovsk	KHL	23	4	2	6	22	—	—	—	—	—
2014–15	Brynäs IF	SHL	11	0	3	3	4	—	—	—	—	—
2014–15	Ilves	Liiga	10	2	5	7	2	—	—	—	—	—
2015–16	LeKi	Mestis	3	0	0	0	0	—	—	—	—	—
2015–16	HC Fassa	ITA	19	12	13	25	10	5	2	3	5	6
2016–17	Yunost Minsk	BLR	39	7	34	41	22	13	2	3	5	4
Liiga totals			441	79	169	248	176	22	1	7	8	2

=== International ===
Year	Team	Event	Result	GP	G	A	Pts	PIM
2003	Finland	WJC	3rd place, bronze medalist(s)	7	1	3	4	0
Junior totals				7	1	3	4	0

Awards and achievements
Preceded by Aleš Hemský	Edmonton Oilers first-round draft pick 2002	Succeeded by Marc Pouliot
