= Peter van Velzen =

Dutch footballer and manager

Personal information
- Full name: Peter van Velzen
- Date of birth: 11 October 1958 (age 68)
- Place of birth: Pijnacker, Netherlands
- Position: Striker

Senior career*
Years	Team	Apps	(Gls)
1983–1984	Sparta Rotterdam	0	(0)
1984–1985	SVV	34	(28)
1985–1987	RKC Waalwijk	54	(38)
1987–1989	HFC Haarlem	23	(6)
1988–1989	SK Beveren	7	(1)
1989–1991	SVV	48	(28)
- * Club domestic league appearances and goals as of 12 July 2010

Peter van Velzen (born 11 October 1958 in Pijnacker, South Holland) is a retired football player who played as a forward.

After ending his professional football career, he became a football manager, guiding FC Dordrecht in the 1991 season. Van Velzen is a three-time topscorer of the Dutch Eerste Divisie.
