= Ulrik Moseby =

Danish footballer (born 1964)

Ulrik Cappelen (né Christensen) (born 28 March 1964), known as Ulrik Moseby, is a Danish former association football player in the midfielder position. Born in Odense, he played 338 games for Odense Boldklub, winning the 1982 and 1989 Danish championships with the club. He scored two goals in 10 games for the Denmark national football team, and also represented the Denmark national under-21 football team.
