= Peter Herda =

Slovak footballer

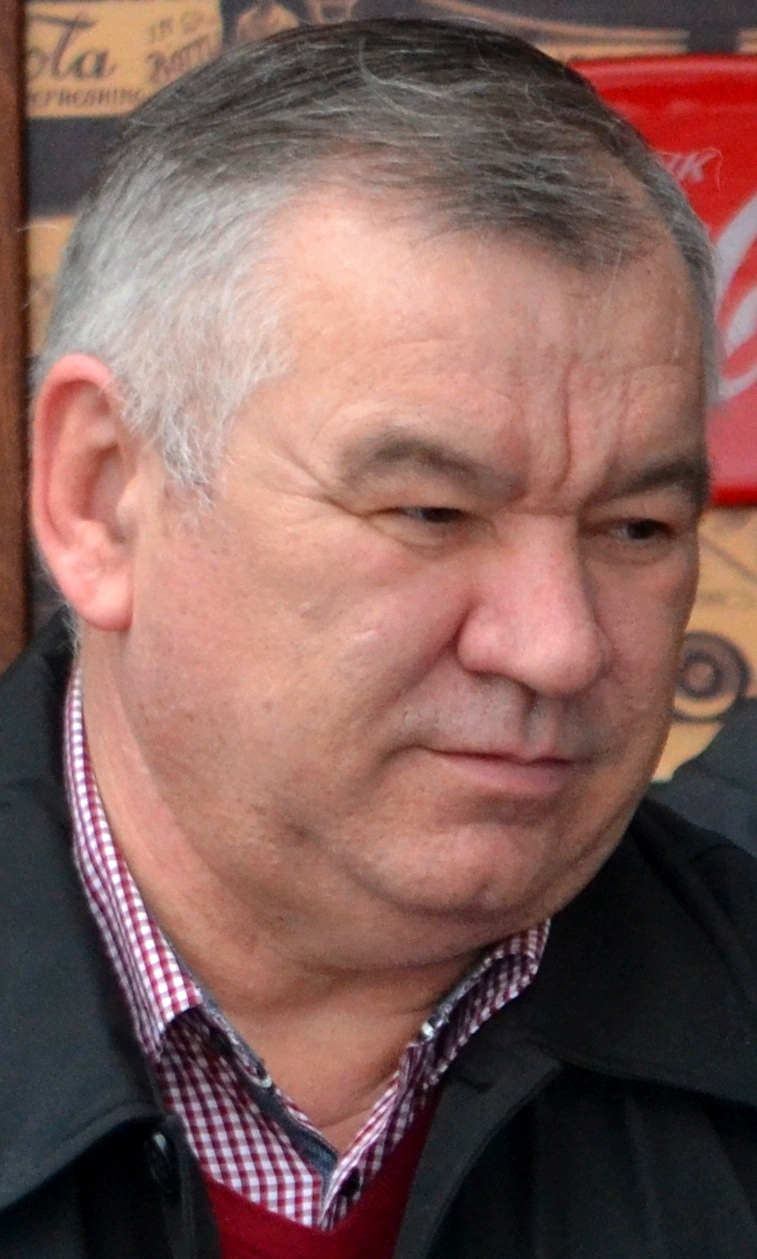
- Peter Herda in 2014

Personal information
- Full name: Peter Herda
- Date of birth: 25 November 1956 (age 69)
- Place of birth: Jacovce, Czechoslovakia
- Position: Striker

Senior career*
Years	Team	Apps	(Gls)
1974–1983	Slavia Prague	221	(79)
1983–1984	Slovan Bratislava	23	(1)
1984–1987	RH Cheb	88	(27)
1987–1988	Charleloi	23	(3)
1988–1989	Bourges		

International career
1986	Czechoslovakia	1	(0)
- * Club domestic league appearances and goals

Peter Herda (born 25 November 1956 in Jacovce) is a Slovak former footballer. He played for Slavia Prague, Slovan Bratislava, RH Cheb, Charleloi and Bourges. Herda played once for the Czechoslovakia national side. He is a member of the Klubu ligových kanonýrů after scoring more than one hundred goals in his career.

== Club career ==
Herda began playing for Slavia Prague in 1974. He was joint top scorer with Ladislav Vízek during the 1981–82 Czechoslovak First League season with fifteen goals scored. He later played for Slavia Prague, Slovan Bratislava, RH Cheb, Charleloi and Bourges.

== International career ==
His only appearance for Czechoslovakia was in a 2–0 victory against East Germany where he played 45 minutes.

== Personal life ==
Herda became a taxi driver working in Prague.

His brother Dušan Herda was a footballer who was in the Czechoslovakia squad that won the 1976 UEFA European Football Championship.

== Honours and achievements ==
=== Individual ===
Performances

- Czechoslovak First League top goalscorer: 1981–82
