= Peter Eccles (footballer) =

Irish former professional soccer player

Personal information
- Full name: Peter Edward Eccles
- Date of birth: 24 August 1962 (age 64)
- Place of birth: Dublin, Republic of Ireland
- Position: Defender

Senior career*
Years	Team	Apps	(Gls)
1981–1988	Shamrock Rovers	126	(17)
1988	Olympic Kingsway SC	?	(?)
1988	Dundalk	4	(0)
1988–1989	Leicester City	1	(0)
1989	→ Stafford Rangers (loan)	2	(0)
1989	Dundalk	3	(0)
1989–1994	Shamrock Rovers	135	(13)
1994–1995	Crusaders	0	(0)
1995–1996	Home Farm Everton	19	(0)
1996	Athlone Town	0	(0)
1996	Shamrock Rovers	1	(0)
1996–1997	Home Farm Everton	17	(1)

International career
1986	Republic of Ireland	1	(0)
1986	League of Ireland XI	2	(0)
- * Club domestic league appearances and goals

Peter Eccles (born 24 August 1962) is an Irish former professional soccer player.

He played for Shamrock Rovers for many years as a centre back and was part of their successful teams of the 1980s. He won a record five league championships with the club, captaining the Rovers side to win the 1993–94 League of Ireland Premier Division. He scored 30 league goals for the Hoops.

== Club career ==
=== Shamrock Rovers ===
He made his League of Ireland debut on 18 October 1981 at Milltown against UCD.

Eccles played throughout the 1980s in the Rovers team that won four league championships in row from 1984 to 1987 – a record achievement in Irish football. The team also won three FAI cups in a row, from 1985 to 1987 – a record only bettered by the Shamrock Rovers team of the 1960s.

The Rovers 'four in a row' team fell apart after the club fell into crisis after the sale of Glenmalure Park in 1987. Eccles went to Australia for six months Australia and a short spell with Dundalk (4 games including one substitute appearance in the UEFA Cup) he signed a 2-year deal with Leicester City in England but only made one first team appearance for them (against Blackburn Rovers) in 1989.

He returned to Rovers in October 1989 and stayed until 1994. In the season 1993/94, he captained Rovers to their 15th league title at the RDS Arena.

However the following year, he left the club on bad terms with the then board of directors. In the absence of any recognition by SRFC to honour his 12-year stint at the club, Rovers fans organised a testimonial night for Peter on 13 November 1994.

Peter made 9 appearances in European competition for Rovers, scoring once, against Linfield in the 1984–85 European Cup.

He was Rovers Player of the Year in 1992/93 Shamrock Rovers#Player of the Year.

=== Later career ===
Peter signed for Crusaders after being let go by Rovers but suffered a broken leg on his debut in a North Belfast derby with Cliftonville in the Ulster Cup on 13 August 1994 which kept him out for the whole season. After 14 months out he signed for Home Farm in December 1995. After a short spell at Athlone Town F.C. he returned to the Hoops for his third spell in September 1996. However lacking first team action he moved to Home Farm Everton in November where he played his last game in the League of Ireland on 27 April 1997. Soon after he retired from the League of Ireland he signed up for top Dublin GAA club Erin Go Bragh where he made a big impact during a distinguished three-year spell at centre half forward.

== International career ==
Eccles had one of Ireland's shortest ever international careers when he replaced Chris Hughton on 23 April 1986 at Lansdowne Road to play the last ten minutes of a 1–1 home friendly game against Uruguay. This was his only ever appearance for the Republic of Ireland national football team. As well as his full international cap he represented the League of Ireland XI in Inter-League games and 1988 Summer Olympics qualifying teams scoring against France in November 1987. He also won one youths cap.
