= Jari Niinimäki =

Finnish footballer (1957–2023)

Personal information
- Full name: Jari Olavi Niinimäki
- Date of birth: 1 December 1957
- Place of birth: Tampere, Finland
- Date of death: 10 June 2023 (aged 65)
- Height: 1.75 m (5 ft 9 in)
- Position: Forward

Senior career*
Years	Team	Apps	(Gls)
1976–1977	TPV Tampere		
1978–1986	Ilves Tampere	166	(71)
1986	AIK	10	(4)
1987–1989	Ilves Tampere	56	(18)

International career
1986–1987	Finland	9	(2)
- * Club domestic league appearances and goals

Jari Olavi Niinimäki (1 December 1957 – 10 June 2023) was a Finnish footballer who played as a forward. He made three appearances for Finland national team.

== Club career ==
Niinimäki played most of his career at his hometown club FC Ilves. The exceptions were only the first two seasons he played as senior, when he played with third-tier Finnish side TPV Tampere, and, later in 1986, when he played abroad in Sweden with AIK in the 1986 Allsvenskan.

Niinimäki spent short time in Yugoslavia with Serbian club FK Partizan. He failed to make a debut in an official game, but made one appearance and scored two goals in a friendly match.

== International career ==
Niinimäki made nine appearances for Finland national team in 1986.

== Personal life and death ==
His son, Jesse Niinimäki, became a professional ice hockey player.

Niinimäki died on 10 June 2023, at the age of 65.

== Honours ==
Ilves

- Veikkausliiga: 1983
- Finnish Cup: 1979
