= Leif Forsberg =

Swedish footballer

Personal information
- Full name: Leif Folke Enar Forsberg
- Date of birth: 15 April 1963 (age 63)
- Place of birth: Sundsvall, Sweden
- Height: 1.82 m (6 ft 0 in)
- Position: Forward

Senior career*
Years	Team	Apps	(Gls)
1980–1988	GIF Sundsvall	153	(56)
1988–1989	IFK Göteborg	26	(2)
1990–2001	GIF Sundsvall	249	(89)
Total		428	(147)

International career
1987–1988	Sweden Olympic	7	(2)
- * Club domestic league appearances and goals

Leif Folke Enar Forsberg (born 15 April 1963) is a Swedish former footballer who played as a forward.

== Career ==
He made his professional debut with GIF Sundsvall at the age of 17, and played his last game for the club at the age of 38. He represented the Sweden Olympic football team seven times between 1987 and 1988, scoring two goals.

== Personal life ==
Forsberg is the son of footballer Lennart Forsberg and has a son, Emil Forsberg, who is also a footballer. He is nicknamed "Lill-Foppa".
