= KFA Awards =

South Korean annual award ceremony

The KFA Awards is an annual award ceremony hosted by Korea Football Association (KFA).

== Player of the Year ==
- KASA Best Footballer: The KFA recommended the best Korean footballer of the year who would be awarded a citation by the Korea Amateur Sports Association (KASA), from 1957 to 1972.
- Most Valuable Player: South Korean journalists selected the best players from 1969 to 1984 under the KFA. The KFA also chose the best players in some other years by itself.
- Fans' Player of the Year: The KFA held an annual poll to select Korean fans' best player in its website from 2003 to 2015.
- Player of the Year: The KFA members and South Korean journalists have voted for annual best Korean players since 2010.

== Women's Player of the Year ==
Year	Player	Club	Ref.
2010	Ji So-yun	Hanyang Women's University	
2011	Ji So-yun (2)	(Japan) INAC Kobe Leonessa	
2012	Jeon Eun-ha	Gangwon State University	
2013	Ji So-yun (3)	(England) Chelsea	
2014	Ji So-yun (4)	(England) Chelsea	
2015	Cho So-hyun	Incheon Hyundai Steel Red Angels	
2016	Kim Jung-mi	Incheon Hyundai Steel Red Angels	
2017	Lee Min-a	Incheon Hyundai Steel Red Angels	
2018	Jang Sel-gi	Incheon Hyundai Steel Red Angels	
2019	Ji So-yun (5)	(England) Chelsea	
2020	Jang Sel-gi (2)	Incheon Hyundai Steel Red Angels	
2021	Ji So-yun (6)	(England) Chelsea	
2022	Ji So-yun (7)	Suwon FC	
2023	Chun Ga-ram	Hwacheon KSPO	
2024	Ji So-yun (8)	(United States) Seattle Reign FC	
2025	Jang Sel-gi (3)	Gyeongju KHNP	

== Young Player of the Year ==
Year	Player	Club	Ref.
2015	Lee Sang-min	Hyundai High School	
2016	Cho Young-wook	Eonnam High School	
2017	Oh Se-hun	Hyundai High School	
2018	Jeon Se-jin	Suwon Samsung Bluewings	
2019	Lee Kang-in	(Spain) Valencia	
2020	Won Du-jae	Ulsan Hyundai	
2021	Seol Young-woo	Ulsan Hyundai	
2022	Yang Hyun-jun	Gangwon FC	
2023	Hwang Jae-won	Daegu FC	
2024	Yang Min-hyeok	Gangwon FC	
2025	Kang Sang-yoon	Jeonbuk Hyundai Motors	

== Coach of the Year ==
Year	Coach	Club	Ref.
1965	Lee Young-chang	Korea Electric Power	
2015	Lee Jang-kwan	Yong In University	
2016	Seo Dong-won	Korea University	
2017	Park Ki-wook	Hyundai High School	
2018	Kim Hak-bum	South Korea U23	
2019	Chung Jung-yong	South Korea U20	
2020	Baek Ki-tae	Pohang Jecheol High School	
2021	Kim Sang-sik	Jeonbuk Hyundai Motors	
2022	(Portugal) Paulo Bento	South Korea	
2023	Kim Gi-dong	Pohang Steelers	
2024	Yoon Jong-hwan	Gangwon FC	
2025	Lee Jung-hyo	Gwangju FC	

== Goal of the Year ==
The KFA held an annual poll to select Korean fans' best goal in its website.

Year	Player	Opponent	Score	Competition	Date	Ref.
2002	Park Ji-sung	Portugal	1–0	2002 FIFA World Cup	14 June 2002	
2003	Not awarded					
2004	Lee Dong-gook	Germany	2–1	International friendly	19 December 2004	
2005	Not awarded					
2006	Kim Do-heon	Chinese Taipei	6–0	2007 AFC Asian Cup qualification	6 September 2006	
2007	Lee Chun-soo	Greece	1–0	International friendly	6 February 2007	
2008	Park Chu-young	Saudi Arabia	2–0	2010 FIFA World Cup qualification	19 November 2008	
2009	Not awarded					
2010	Park Ji-sung (2)	Japan	1–0	International friendly	24 May 2010	
2011	Yoon Bit-garam	Iran	1–0 (a.e.t.)	2011 AFC Asian Cup	22 January 2011	
2012	Park Chu-young (2)	Japan U23	1–0	2012 Summer Olympics	10 August 2012	
2013	Ha Dae-sung	(Iran) Esteghlal	1–0	2013 AFC Champions League	2 October 2013	
2014	Lee Keun-ho	Russia	1–0	2014 FIFA World Cup	17 June 2014	
2015	Son Heung-min	Australia	1–1	2015 AFC Asian Cup	22 January 2015	
2016	Son Heung-min (2)	Germany Olympic	2–2	2016 Summer Olympics	7 August 2016	
2017	Lee Seung-woo	Argentina U20	1–0	2017 FIFA U-20 World Cup	23 May 2017	
2018	Son Heung-min (3)	Germany	2–0	2018 FIFA World Cup	27 June 2018	
2019	Hwang Ui-jo	Iran	1–0	International friendly	11 June 2019	
2020	Cho Gue-sung	Iran U23	2–0	2020 AFC U-23 Championship	12 January 2020	
2021	Son Heung-min (4)	Iran	1–0	2022 FIFA World Cup qualification	12 October 2021	
2022	Hwang Hee-chan	Portugal	2–1	2022 FIFA World Cup	2 December 2022	
2023	Son Heung-min (5)	Singapore	3–0	2026 FIFA World Cup qualification	16 November 2023	
2024	Son Heung-min (6)	Australia	2–1 (a.e.t.)	2023 AFC Asian Cup	2 February 2024	
2025	Son Heung-min (7)	Bolivia	1–0	International friendly	14 November 2025	

== Hall of Fame ==
=== Player ===
Year	Inductee	Ref.
2005	Kim Yong-sik	
2005	Hong Deok-young	
2005	Lee Hoe-taik	
2005	Cha Bum-kun	

=== Contributor ===
Year	Inductee	Ref.
2005	Kim Hwa-jip	
2005	(Netherlands) Guus Hiddink	
2005	Chung Mong-joon	

== Best XI (1969–1988) ==
South Korean journalists selected the best eleven annually from 1969 to 1988 under the KFA. Players marked bold won the Most Valuable Player award in that respective year.

Year	Goalkeeper	Defenders	Midfielders	Forwards	Ref.
1969	Lee Se-yeon	Seo Yoon-chan; Kim Jung-nam; Lim Kook-chan; Choi Tae-yeol; Kim Ho	—	Kim Ki-bok; Lee Hoe-taik; Jeong Kang-ji; Jung Byung-tak; Lee Yi-woo	
1970	Lee Se-yeon (2)	Kim Jung-nam (2); Kim Ho (2); Choi Jae-mo; Park Byung-joo	Seo Yoon-chan (2); Kim Ki-bok (2)	Lee Hoe-taik (2); Jeong Kang-ji (2); Park Lee-chun; Park Su-deok	
1971	Lee Se-yeon (3)	Kim Ho (3); Kim Jung-nam (3); Choi Kil-su; Choi Jae-mo (2)	Lee Cha-man; Kim Chang-il	Park Lee-chun (2); Lee Hoe-taik (3); Park Su-deok (2); Jung Kyu-pung	
1972	Lee Se-yeon (4)	Kim Ho (4); Park Young-tae; Kim Ho-kon; Hwang Jae-man	Ko Jae-wook; Lee Cha-man (2)	Park Lee-chun (3); Kim Jae-han; Cha Bum-kun; Lee Hoe-taik (4)	
1973	Byun Ho-young	Yoo Ki-heung; Park Young-tae (2); Kang Ki-wook; Kim Ho-kon (2)	Ko Jae-wook (2); Park Byung-chul	Park Lee-chun (4); Cha Bum-kun (2); Jung Kyu-pung (2); Kim Jae-han (2)	
1974	Byun Ho-young (2)	Kang Ki-wook (2); Kim Ho-kon (3); Choi Jae-mo (3); Hwang Jae-man (2)	Ko Jae-wook (3); Park Byung-chul (2)	Cha Bum-kun (3); Lee Hoe-taik (5); Park Lee-chun (5); Huh Jung-moo	
1975	Kwon Yi-woon	Kim Ho-kon (4); Hwang Jae-man (3); Cho Young-jeung; Choi Jong-duk	Park Byung-chul (3); Park Sang-in	Cha Bum-kun (4); Kim Jin-kook; Lee Young-moo; Cho Dong-hyun	
1976	Kim Hee-cheon	Kim Ho-kon (5); Choi Jong-duk (2); Hwang Jae-man (4); Park Sung-hwa	Kim Kang-nam; Park Sang-in (2)	Cha Bum-kun (5); Kim Jin-kook (2); Lee Young-moo (2); Park Yong-joo	
1977	Kim Hee-cheon (2)	Kim Ho-kon (6); Choi Jong-duk (3); Cho Young-jeung (2); Park Sung-hwa (2)	Cho Kwang-rae; Park Sang-in (3)	Cha Bum-kun (6); Kim Jae-han (3); Lee Young-moo (3); Huh Jung-moo (2)	
1978	Kim Hwang-ho	Kim Ho-kon (7); Cho Young-jeung (3); Park Sung-hwa (3); Hwang Jae-man (5)	Cho Kwang-rae (2); Park Sang-in (4); Lee Young-moo (4)	Kim Jae-han (4); Cha Bum-kun (7); Huh Jung-moo (3)	
1979	Kim Hwang-ho (2)	Kim Ho-kon (8); Cho Young-jeung (4); Park Byung-chul (4); Lee Jang-soo	Park Sang-in (5); Cho Kwang-rae (3)	Park Sung-hwa (4); Lee Young-moo (5); Shin Hyun-ho; Huh Jung-moo (4)	
1980	Cho Byung-deuk	Cho Young-jeung (5); Hong Seong-ho; Choi Jong-duk (4); Chang Woe-ryong	Cho Kwang-rae (4); Lee Young-moo (6); Lee Kang-jo	Chung Hae-won; Choi Soon-ho; Park Jong-won	
1981	Jung Seong-gyo	Park Sung-hwa (5); Kwon Oh-son; Chang Woe-ryong (2); Park Kyung-hoon	Cho Kwang-rae (5); Lee Kang-jo (2); Lee Tae-ho	Hwang Seok-keun; Chung Hae-won (2); Byun Byung-joo	
1982	Not awarded				
1983	Jeong Gi-dong	Park Sung-hwa (6); Lee Kang-jo (3); Jang Jung; Yoo Byung-ok	Cho Kwang-rae (6); Kim Chong-kon	Kim Jong-boo; Lee Kil-yong; Park Yoon-ki; Lee Chun-seok	
1984	Choi In-young	Park Kyung-hoon (2); Chung Yong-hwan; Park Sung-hwa (7); Kim Pan-keun	Huh Jung-moo (5); Lee Tae-ho (2); Park Chang-sun	Choi Soon-ho (2); Baek Jong-chul; Kim Jong-boo (2)	
1985	Cho Byung-deuk (2)	Chung Yong-hwan (2); Chung Jong-soo; Park Kyung-hoon (3); Yoo Byung-ok (2)	Park Chang-sun (2); Cho Kwang-rae (7); Huh Jung-moo (6)	Choi Soon-ho (3); Kim Jong-boo (3); Kim Joo-sung	
1986	Cho Byung-deuk (3)	Cho Young-jeung (6); Cho Min-kook; Park Kyung-hoon (4); Huh Jung-moo (7)	Park Chang-sun (3); Cho Kwang-rae (8); Lee Heung-sil	Choi Soon-ho (4); Chung Hae-won (3); Kim Joo-sung (2)	
1987	Cho Byung-deuk (4)	Chung Yong-hwan (3); Nam Ki-young; Park Kyung-hoon (5); Kim Pyung-seok	Kim Sam-soo; Noh Soo-jin; Lee Tae-ho (3)	Choi Sang-kook; Kim Joo-sung (3); Chung Hae-won (4)	
1988	Cho Byung-deuk (5)	Cho Min-kook (2); Gu Sang-bum; Park Kyung-hoon (6); Chung Yong-hwan (4)	Choi Kang-hee; Chung Hae-won (5); Hwangbo Kwan	Kim Joo-sung (4); Lee Tae-ho (4); Hwang Sun-hong	

== See also ==
- Korea Football Association
