= Park Young-tae =

South Korean footballer (born 1948)

Park Young-tae 박영태
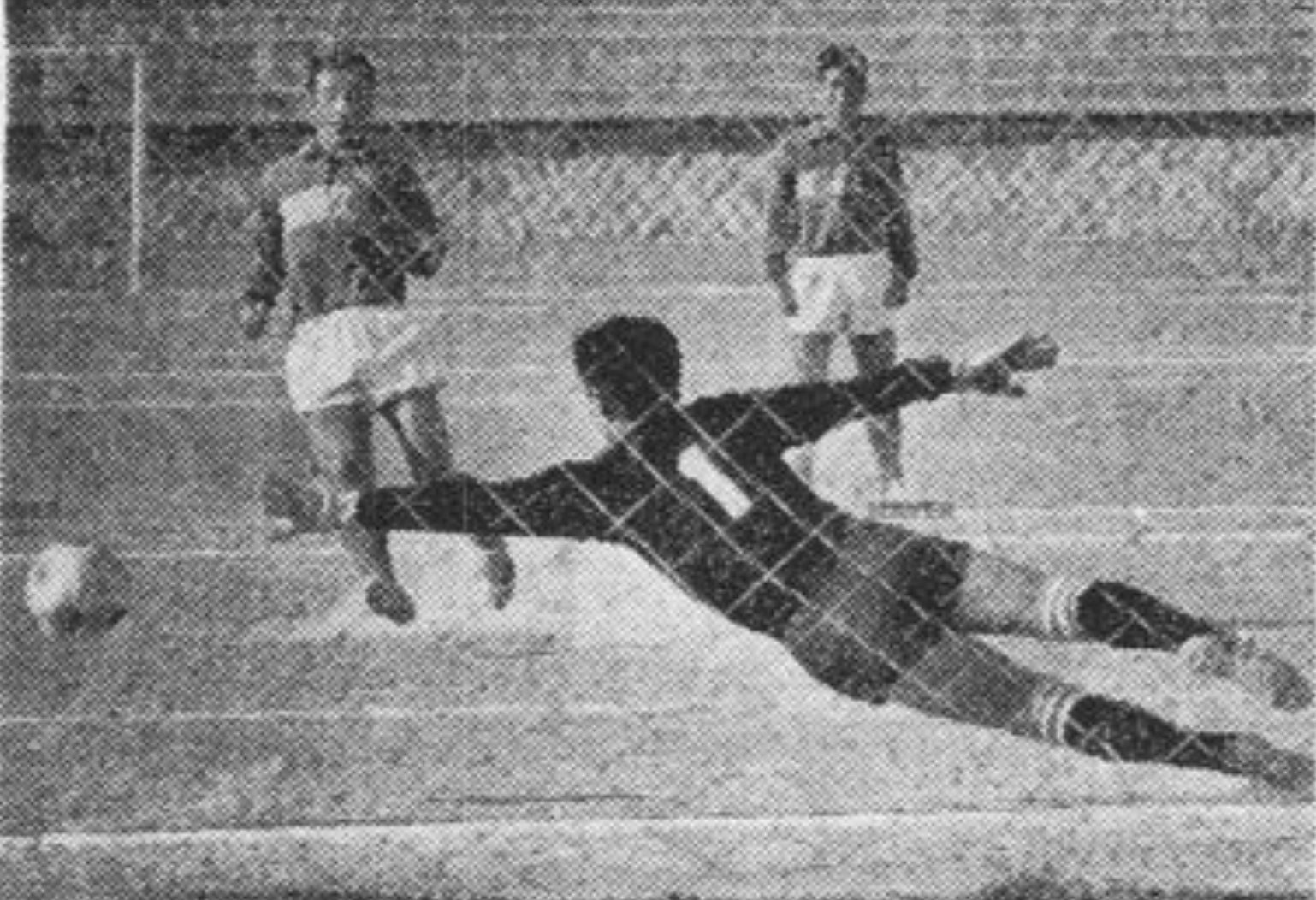
- Park scoring a penalty kick against the Korea Army

Personal information
- Full name: Park Young-tae
- Date of birth: November 12, 1948 (age 77)
- Place of birth: Seoul, Gyeonggi, South Korea
- Position: Full back

Youth career
- 1967–1968: Dongnae High School
- 1968–1972: Yonsei University

Senior career*
Years	Team	Apps	(Gls)
1972–1974	→ ROK Marine Corps (draft)		
1975–1979	POSCO Atoms		

International career
1968	South Korea U20	8	(2)
1968–1971	South Korea B		
1971–1975	South Korea		

Managerial career
- 1981–1987: POSCO Atoms (Coach)
Medal record
Men's football
Representing South Korea
AFC Asian Cup
Silver medal – second place	1972 Thailand	Team
- * Club domestic league appearances and goals

- Park Young-tae
- Hangul: 박영태
- Hanja: 朴永泰
- RR: Bak Yeongtae
- MR: Pak Yŏngt'ae

Park Young-tae (Korean: 박영태; Hanja: 朴永泰, born November 12, 1948) is a South Korean former footballer and manager. He played for the Korea Marine Corps and the POSCO Atoms throughout the 1970s and represented his home country internationally in the 1972 AFC Asian Cup and the 1974 Asian Games, reaching runners-up in the Asian Cup.

== Club career ==
In 1964, Park would be successfully admitted into Whimoon Middle School and would graduate from the school in 1965 with admission into Dongnae High School that same year. By 1967, Park would play for their football club He would graduate from the high school in 1968 and then enroll in Yonsei University where he would be scouted to play for their football club. In the 1970 and 1971 seasons, he would still play for the university. His final season with the university would occur in the spring 1972 season as he would later be conscripted to play for the ROK Marine Corps. In December 1974, Park would be scouted to play for POSCO Atoms beginning in the 1975 season. In the 1977 Korean National Football Championship, Park would be part of the runners-up POSCO squad after performing strong plays throughout the season. He would continue to play for the club in the 1978 season where he would earn the award of Merit that year and the 1979 season where he would score a goal against Myongji University before retiring from football as a player.

== International career ==
Park would first represent his home country via his inclusion in the final roster for the 1968 AFC Youth Championship. In the opening match within Group A of the tournament against Hong Kong, Park would score a penalty kick in the 16th minute of the 2nd half of the match, contributing to a 4–1 victory over them. Park would score again during the second-round match against the Philippines, resulting in a 3–1 victory. He would also play in the 1968 Merdeka Tournament. Park would later be called up to play a friendly with Middlesex Wanderers at the Dongdaemun Stadium as part of a tour in May 24 and 25, 1969. He would also be called up to participate in the 1970 Jakarta Anniversary Tournament as part of South Korea B. In the same year, Park would be part of the B team to play in a friendly against Benfica where Eusébio would shoot past Park, scoring a goal from 30 meters from the outside. Following this, Park would continue to remain in the B team to train for the 1971 President's Cup Football Tournament and the 1972 AFC Asian Cup. Park later returned for the 1971 Jakarta Anniversary Tournament as part of the final 21-man squad of the tournament. Park would also be listed in the final South Korean squad of the 1971 Merdeka Tournament as well as being called up to play against China where South Korea would lose 1–0.

He would find promotion to the main senior squad in the same year to prepare for the 1974 FIFA World Cup qualifiers. By January 1972 however, he and five other South Korean players would be injured around their ankles and unable to train properly with the team overall not achieving their expected results. Despite this though, Park would recover to where he would be listed in the final squad for the upcoming 1972 AFC Asian Cup. Alongside other Korean defenders Kim Kyung-jung and Kim Ho, he would be credited for exercising an initially strong South Korean defense against Kuwait as well as attempting a goal despite the Taegeuk Warriors later going on to lose the match 1–2. He would also be listed to participate in the 1972 Tehran Friendship Tournament which was held from the 11th of July to the 23rd. Park would be listed in the final South Korean roster for the 1972 President's Cup Football Tournament. Both Park and Kim Ho would be credited for preventing Thailand from making close attempts at scoring in the first half due to their repeated interceptions with South Korea later winning 3–0. He would also perform an assist for Kim Jin-kook to score the second goal against the Khmer Republic. Afterwards, Park would be listed in the final squad for the 1972 King's Cup held in Thailand. During South Korea's first match against Malaysia, Park would commit a foul that would result in a penalty kick for the Malayan Tigers but would be successfully blocked by Lee Se-yeon. He would also accidentally score an own goal for Indonesia while attempting to stop a shot with the match ending in a 1–1 draw. Despite these incidents, for his contributions to the national team in the year, he was voted in as a member of the best South Korean starting XI of the 1972 season.

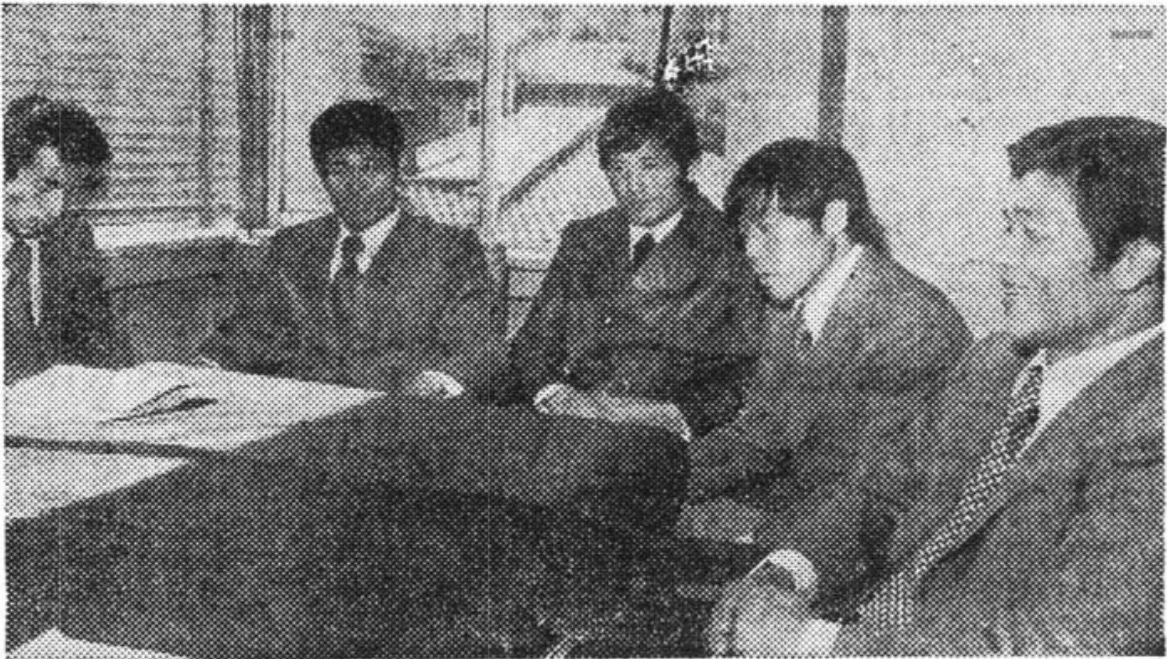
Park (far left) with Lee Se-yeon, Kim Jae-han, Park Lee-chun and Byun Ho-young.

Park would then be named to participate in the upcoming 1974 FIFA World Cup qualifiers as part of the preliminary 25-man squad. During the match against Malaysia, Park would attempt to score a goal but his attempt would be blocked by Malaysian goalkeeper R. Arumugam with the match later ending in a 0–0 draw. During their subsequent match against Israel, Israeli forward Gidi Damti would nearly make a goal due to a critical defensive error from Park as well as Lee Se-yeon failing to block the ball in time but the attempt would ultimately miss. Conversely, Park would be noted as a major contributor to the 3–1 victory against Hong Kong in the semi-finals as he would successfully prevent main Hongkonger goal scorer Kwok Ka Ming from being able to score any goals. In the subsequent rematch and final of Zone A against Israel, would block a free kick by Israeli defender Yisha'ayahu Schwager. Later during the extra time allocated for the match, alongside Kim Ho-kon, would assist Cha Bum-kun in scoring the deciding goal in extra time. During a friendly against Japan, Park would be credited with forming a strong defense alongside Kim Ho-kon, Kim Jung-nam, and Yoo Kee-heung, allowing for South Korea to win 2–0. Park would also participate in the 1973 President's Cup Football Tournament as part of the South Korean squad. Despite this though, during the opening match against the Khmer Republic, Park would be replaced with Park Byung-chul who was only 19 years old at the time. The given explanation for why established older players would be suddenly replaced by younger players would be how younger players were typically cited as having consistently better health conditions.

Despite this however, he would still be a starting player within South Korea after a major internal restructure that favored young talent. During the final series of matches of the 1974 FIFA World Cup qualifiers against Australia beginning on October 28, Park, Yoo Kee-heung and Kang Ki-wook would put up a strong defense against the Socceroos to where they would be unable to make a single attempt despite the match being held at their home stadium at the Sydney Sports Ground after the South Korean defenders were able to deduce on their main passing strategies. Despite this initial praise, when it came time for the second match to be held at the Dongdaemun Stadium in Seoul, Park was criticized for his overreliance on his other teammates as well as frequently missing passes from them, ultimately leading to a 2–2 draw. Despite Park blocking an attempted goal by Attila Abonyi in the 37th minute, South Korea would ultimately be eliminated from classifying for the 1974 FIFA World Cup. He later went on to play in the 1973 King's Cup as part of the 17-man squad representing his home country. For his contributions, he would receive his second award as part of the best starting South Korean XI in the 1973 KFA Awards.

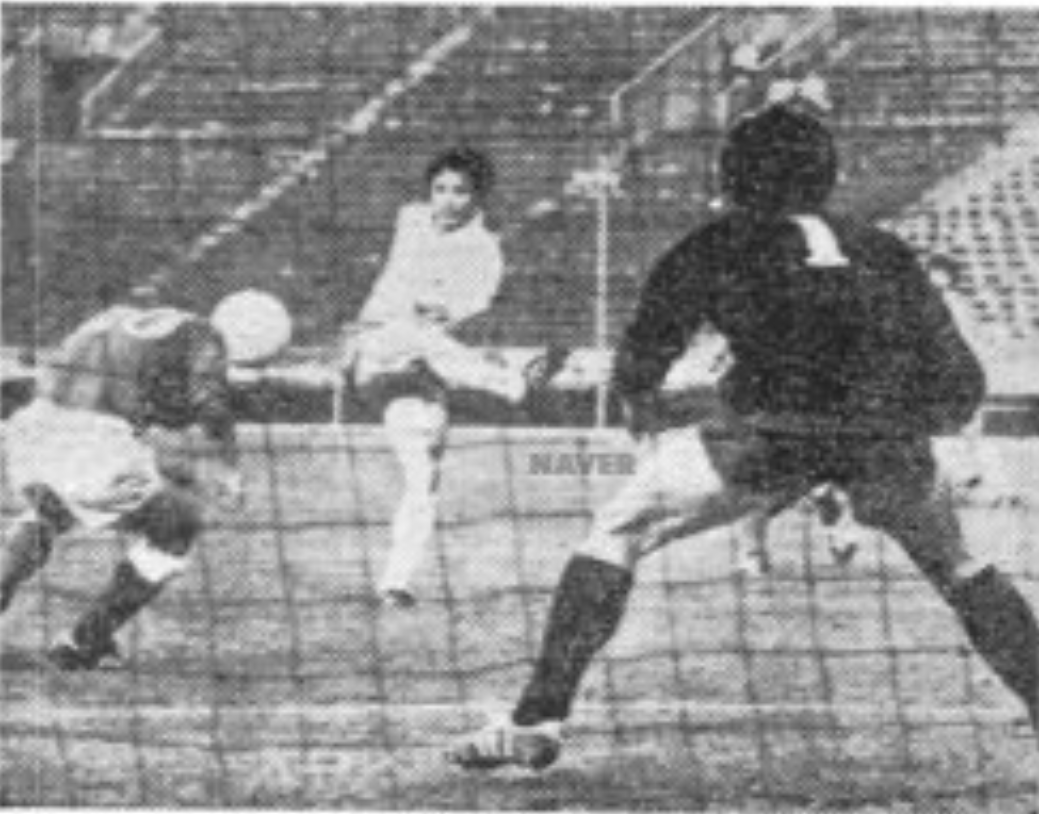
Kunishige Kamamoto scoring his second goal in a friendly against South Korea past Park and Kim Jin-bok.

His presence within international football would gradually decline throughout 1974 as despite being listed in the preliminary roster for the upcoming 1974 President's Cup Football Tournament and the 1974 Asian Games., Park would be initially excluded from the final roster due to leg injuries although he would later make the final roster after a reconsideration in regards to the morale within South Korea. During the match against Iraq, Park would cause a severe enough infraction to where a free kick was granted to Iraqi forward Jalil Hanoon but Byun Ho-young would successfully block the attempt. Despite playing more aggressively in their subsequent match against Iran in the second round, the South Korean defense would be completely undermined by the second half of the match, eliminating the Taegeuk Warriors from the tournament. During a rematch against Japan in a friendly, South Korea would unusually lose 4–1 as Japanese forward Kunishige Kamamoto would score the 3rd goal past Park and South Korean goalkeeper Kim Jin-bok. Park would then play for the 1974 King's Cup as he was named in the final roster for the tournament. Despite this though, he would only play in one match against Cambodia as South Korea would later go on to win the tournament.

Park would be named for the 1975 President's Cup Football Tournament as part of a 32-man preliminary squad but would ultimately be excluded from participation, marking an abrupt end to his international career. This exclusion of veteran players such as Park would be met with criticism with some sentiments regarding the current composition deprived of a singular starring player for South Korea.

== Managerial career ==
Park would enjoy a brief career as a manager as he would manage his old club of POSCO after the club was undergoing a reorganization process following the underwhelming performance of the club in prior seasons despite having talented players in their roster in 1981. He would remain in the club in the 1982 season alongside former teammate Park Soo-il upon the recommendation of chairman Park Tae-joon. Finally, he would oversee the 1986 K League Championship where the POSCO Atoms would become champions of the tournament. Following this, he would oversee the club participate in the 1987 King's Cup where they would reach runners-up.

== Personal life ==
By July 1973, Park would be married and had a 10-month-old son born in Busan.
