= List of Asian Club Championship and AFC Champions League Elite winning managers =

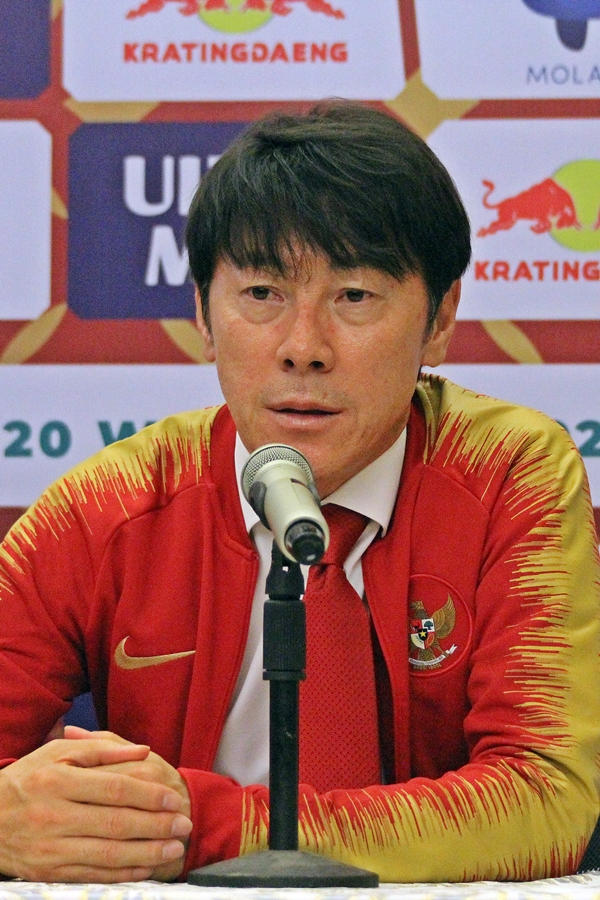
Shin Tae-yong won the trophy in 1995 as a player and 2010 as a manager, the first to do so.

This is a list of Asian Club Championship and AFC Champions League winning managers. Israeli Yosef Merimovich won the first two finals of the competition with Hapoel Tel Aviv and its rival Maccabi Tel Aviv when it was known as the Asian Champion Club Tournament. The competition became the Asian Club Championship upon its resurrection in 1985 and rebranded the AFC Champions League in 2002 after a merge between the Asian Club Championship and the Asian Cup Winners' Cup. The latest iteration of the competition is run in a single year from 2004 to 2021 (de jure 2022) before returning to double year from the 2023–24 season.

Six managers have won the tournament the most with two titles; Choi Kang-hee, Anghel Iordănescu, Kim Ho, Merimovich, Charnwit Polcheewin, and Park Seong-hwa. Only two who have won the title with two clubs: Merimovich (in 1967 with Hapoel Tel Aviv and 1969 with Maccabi Tel Aviv) and Iordănescu (with Al-Hilal in 1999–2000 and Al-Ittihad in 2005). Only one man has won the tournament both as a player and as a manager: South Korean Shin Tae-yong. He is among the nine different South Korean managers to have won the competition.

== By year ==
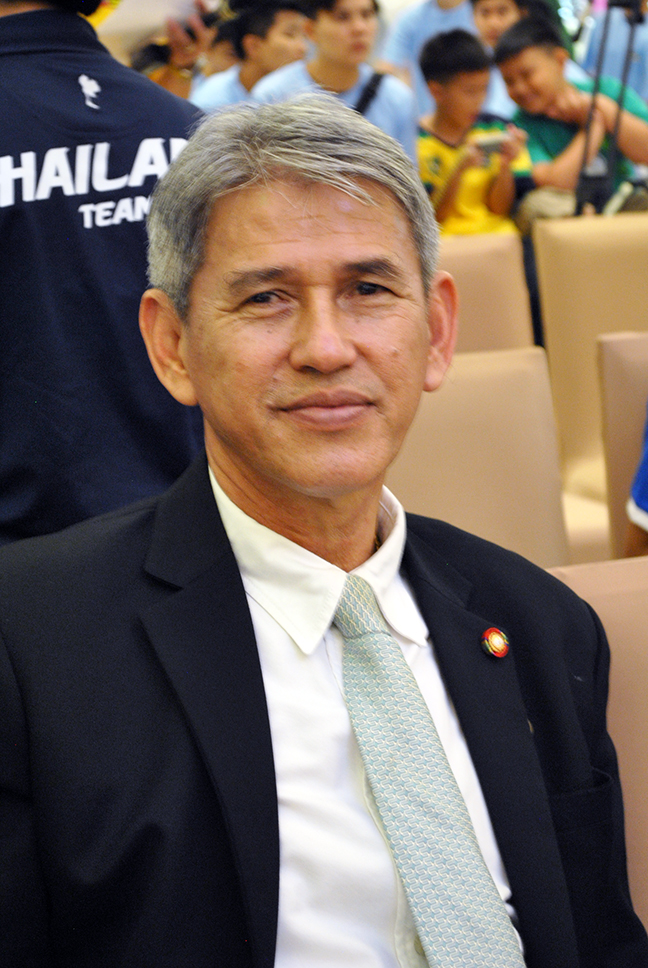
Charnwit Polcheewin won the trophy in 1993 and 1994, the first Southeast Asian to do so.

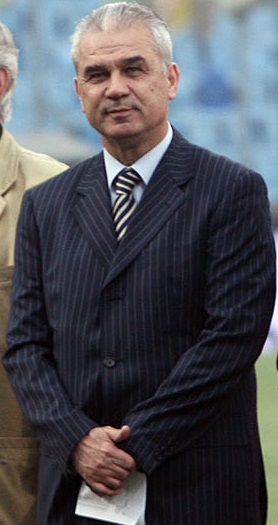
Anghel Iordănescu won the trophy in 2000 and 2005

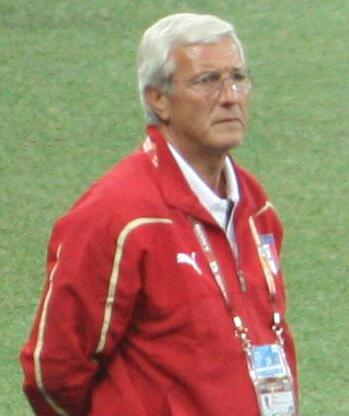
Marcello Lippi won the trophy in 2013

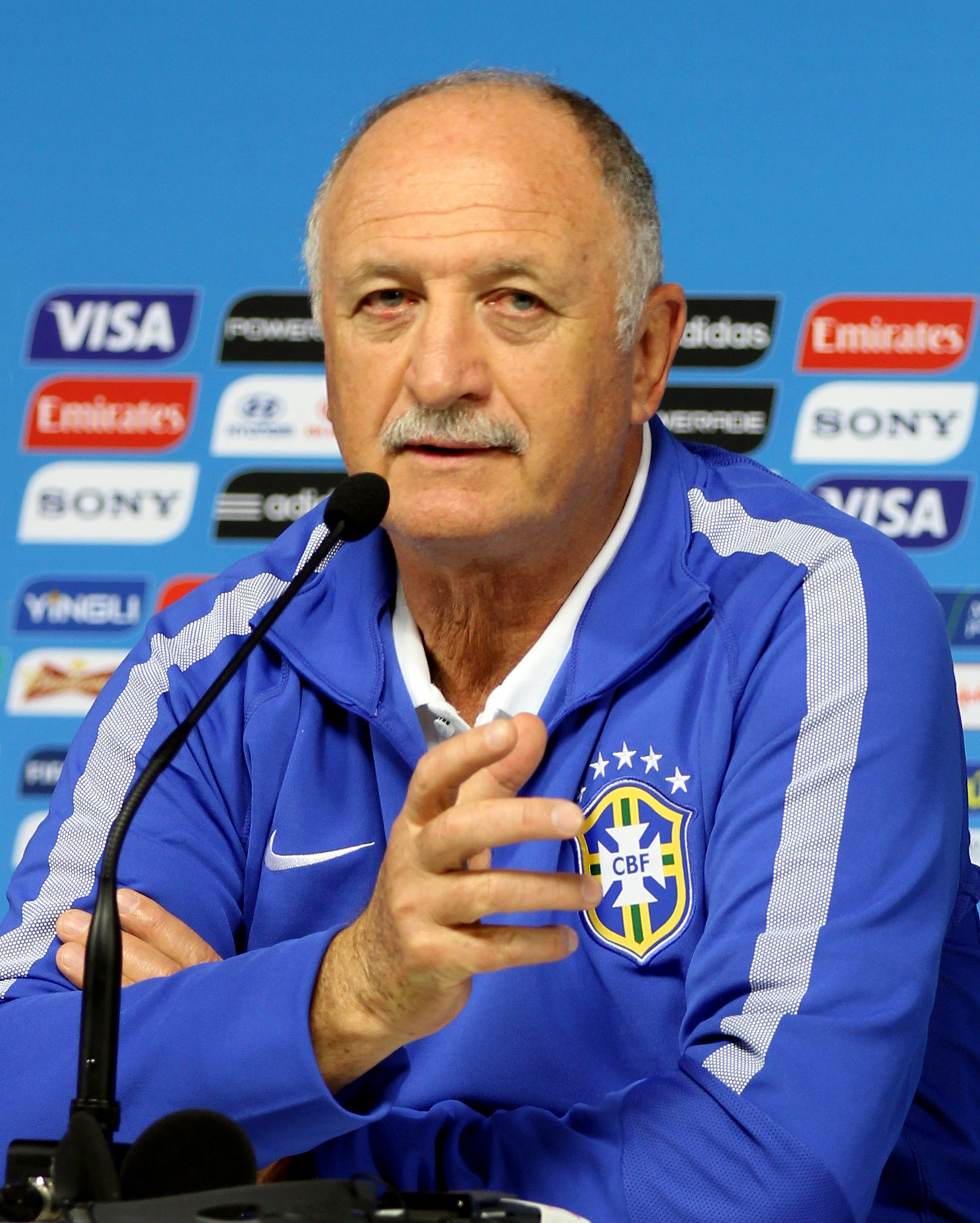
Luiz Felipe Scolari won the trophy in 2015

Final	Nationality	Winning manager	Country	Club
1967	ISR	Yosef Merimovich	ISR	Hapoel Tel Aviv
1969	ISR	Yosef Merimovich	ISR	Maccabi Tel Aviv
1970	YUG	Zdravko Rajkov	IRN	Taj
1971	ISR	Israel Halivner	ISR	Maccabi Tel Aviv
1972	Cancelled			
1985–86	KOR	Chang Woon-soo	KOR	Daewoo Royals
1986	JPN	Eijun Kiyokumo	JPN	Furukawa Electric
1987	JPN	George Yonashiro	JPN	Yomiuri FC
1988–89	QAT	Obeid Jumma	QAT	Al-Sadd
1989–90	CHN	Li Yingfa	CHN	Liaoning FC
1990–91	IRN	Mansour Pourheidari	IRN	Esteghlal
1991	BRA	Edson Tavares	KSA	Al-Hilal
1992–93	IRN	Firouz Karimi	IRN	PAS Tehran
1993–94	THA	Charnwit Polcheewin	THA	Thai Farmers Bank
1994–95	THA	Charnwit Polcheewin	THA	Thai Farmers Bank
1995	KOR	Park Jong-hwan	KOR	Ilhwa Chunma
1996–97	KOR	Park Sung-hwa	KOR	Pohang Steelers
1997–98	KOR	Park Sung-hwa	KOR	Pohang Steelers
1998–99	JPN	Takashi Kuwahara	JPN	Júbilo Iwata
1999–2000	ROU	Anghel Iordănescu	KSA	Al-Hilal
2000–01	KOR	Kim Ho	KOR	Suwon Samsung Bluewings
2001–02	KOR	Kim Ho	KOR	Suwon Samsung Bluewings
2002–03	FRA	Bruno Metsu	UAE	Al Ain
2004	CRO	Dragan Talajić	KSA	Al-Ittihad
2005	ROU	Anghel Iordănescu	KSA	Al-Ittihad
2006	KOR	Choi Kang-hee	KOR	Jeonbuk Hyundai Motors
2007	GER	Holger Osieck	JPN	Urawa Red Diamonds
2008	JPN	Akira Nishino	JPN	Gamba Osaka
2009	BRA	Sérgio Farias	KOR	Pohang Steelers
2010	KOR	Shin Tae-yong	KOR	Seongnam Ilhwa Chunma
2011	URU	Jorge Fossati	QAT	Al-Sadd
2012	KOR	Kim Ho-kon	KOR	Ulsan Hyundai
2013	ITA	Marcello Lippi	CHN	Guangzhou Evergrande
2014	AUS	Tony Popovic	AUS	Western Sydney Wanderers
2015	BRA	Luiz Felipe Scolari	CHN	Guangzhou Evergrande
2016	KOR	Choi Kang-hee	KOR	Jeonbuk Hyundai Motors
2017	JPN	Takafumi Hori	JPN	Urawa Red Diamonds
2018	JPN	Go Oiwa	JPN	Kashima Antlers
2019	ROU	Răzvan Lucescu	KSA	Al-Hilal
2020	KOR	Kim Do-hoon	KOR	Ulsan Hyundai
2021	POR	Leonardo Jardim	KSA	Al-Hilal
2022	POL	Maciej Skorża	JPN	Urawa Red Diamonds
2023–24	ARG	Hernán Crespo	UAE	Al Ain
2024–25	GER	Matthias Jaissle	KSA	Al-Ahli
2025–26	GER	Matthias Jaissle	KSA	Al-Ahli

== By nationality ==
This table lists the total number of titles won by managers of each nationality.

Nationality	Number of wins
South Korea	11
Japan	6
Germany	3
Israel	3
Romania	3
Brazil	3
Iran	2
Thailand	2
Qatar	1
Croatia	1
China	1
Yugoslavia	1
France	1
Uruguay	1
Italy	1
Australia	1
Portugal	1
Poland	1
Argentina	1
