= 1983–1995 Yukong Elephants seasons =

South Korean football club seasons

An original member of the K-League founded on 17 December 1983, the team was then called the Yukong Elephants. Yukong was owned and financially supported by the Sunkyoung Group's subsidiary, Yukong (currently SK Group's "SK Energy"), along with Seoul, Incheon, Gyeonggi as its franchise. The Kokkiri ("elephant) was its mascot. The club won the league championship on only one occasion (in 1989).

== Jeju United FC (Yukong Elephants) seasons 1983-1995 statistics ==
Season	K-League	Played	W	D	L	F	A	PTS	League Cup	FA Cup	Manager
1983	3rd	16	5	7	4	26	24	17			Lee Jong-Hwan
1984	Runners-up	28	13	9	6	38	22	53			Lee Jong-Hwan
1985	5th	21	7	5	9	28	26	19			Lee Jong-Hwan / Kim Jung-Nam
1986	4th	20	7	5	8	29	26	19	3위		Kim Jung-Nam
1987	3rd	32	9	9	14	34	43	27			Kim Jung-Nam
1988	3rd	24	8	8	8	25	24	24			Kim Jung-Nam
1989	Winner	40	17	15	8	51	40	49			Kim Jung-Nam
1990	4th	30	8	12	10	27	30	28			Kim Jung-Nam
1991	4th	40	10	17	13	38	40	37			Kim Jung-Nam
1992	6th	30	7	8	15	33	38	22	4th		Kim Jung-Nam
1993	5th	30	14	9	16	25	31	48	6th		Park Sung-Wha
1994	Runners-up	30	14	9	7	47	31	51	Winner		Park Sung-Wha
1995	4th	28	9	9	10	28	30	36	5th		Valeri Nepomniachi
