= Kim Jong-boo =

South Korean footballer (born 1965)

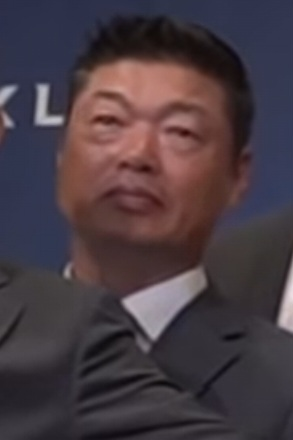
- Kim in 2019

Personal information
- Full name: Kim Jong-boo
- Date of birth: 13 January 1965 (age 61)
- Place of birth: Tongyeong, Gyeongnam, South Korea
- Height: 1.83 m (6 ft 0 in)
- Position: Forward

College career
Years	Team	Apps	(Gls)
1983–1987	Korea University		

Senior career*
Years	Team	Apps	(Gls)
1988–1989	POSCO Atoms	33	(1)
1990–1993	Daewoo Royals	37	(5)
1993–1994	Ilhwa Chunma	3	(0)
1995	Daewoo Royals	3	(0)
Total		76	(6)

International career
1983	South Korea U20	10 (Note: Includes two appearances and one goal against a club.)	(4)
1983–1985	South Korea B		
1983–1990	South Korea	25	(8)

Managerial career
- 2002–2005: Dong-Eui University
- 2011–2012: Yangju Citizen
- 2013–2015: Hwaseong FC
- 2016–2019: Gyeongnam FC
- 2021–2022: Hebei
- 2024: Nanjing City
- * Club domestic league appearances and goals

Kim Jong-boo (Korean: 김종부, born 13 January 1965) is a South Korean football manager and former player. He was one of the most influential footballers in South Korea during the 1980s.

== Playing career ==
In the 1983 FIFA World Youth Championship, Kim showed great performances including his two goals and two assists, leading South Korean under-20 team to the semi-finals. He became the most popular young footballer in South Korea after the World Youth Championship, and interested K League clubs. Prior to his graduation from Korea University, Kim wanted to join Daewoo Royals which was employing his former coach Lee Cha-man, but Korea University pressured on him to join Hyundai Horang-i due to their deal with Hyundai. During the conflict between Daewoo and Hyundai over him, Hyundai insisted on his agreement after getting a provisional contract with his brother-in-law who was his agent. Afterwards, Kim denied the provisional contract by announcing he would go to Daewoo, and Korea University deprived him of his qualification as a player to obstruct his move to Daewoo. However, they postponed their disciplinary action against him until after the 1986 FIFA World Cup due to other national players' complaints. Kim played two World Cup matches as a substitute with the help of his colleagues. He scored the equaliser in a 1–1 draw with Bulgaria, earning South Korea's first-ever World Cup point.

The conflict between Daewoo and Hyundai was continued even after the World Cup, and Kim couldn't make any official appearance due to his suspension until 1987. By the way, the Korea Football Association (KFA) allowed his registration as a Daewoo player in November 1987, trying to bring him back into the field. Hyundai announced the dissolution of their football club after being outraged at KFA's decision. KFA president Choi Soon-young had to resign to pacify Hyundai, one of the biggest sponsors in South Korean football, and Kim also had to join one of the other clubs. Kim finally joined POSCO Atoms in 1988, but two-year dispute weakened him physically and mentally. His professional career wasn't as successful as expected.

== Career statistics ==
=== Club ===
Appearances and goals by club, season and competition
Club	Season	League			National cup		League cup		Continental		Total	
Club	Season	Division	Apps	Goals	Apps	Goals	Apps	Goals	Apps	Goals	Apps	Goals
POSCO Atoms	1988	K League	15	0	? (Note: Appearance(s) in Korean National Championship)	?	—		—		15	0
POSCO Atoms	1989	K League	18	1	—		—		—		18	1
POSCO Atoms	Total		33	1	?	?	—		—		33	1
Daewoo Royals	1990	K League	22	5	—		—		—		22	5
Daewoo Royals	1991	K League	7	0	—		—		—		7	0
Daewoo Royals	1992	K League	6	0	—		0	0	—		6	0
Daewoo Royals	1993	K League	2	0	—		0	0	—		2	0
Daewoo Royals	Total		37	5	—		0	0	—		37	5
Ilhwa Chunma	1993	K League	1	0	—		2	0	—		3	0
Ilhwa Chunma	1994	K League	2	0	—		1	0	? (Note: Appearance(s) in Asian Club Championship)	?	3	0
Ilhwa Chunma	Total		3	0	—		3	0	?	?	6	0
Daewoo Royals	1995	K League	3	0	—		2	0	—		5	0
Career total			76	6	?	?	5	0	?	?	81	6

=== International ===
Results list South Korea's goal tally first.

List of international goals scored by Kim Jong-boo
No.	Date	Venue	Opponent	Score	Result	Competition
1	3 November 1983	Bangkok, Thailand	China	2–0	3–3	1984 Summer Olympics qualification
2	5 November 1983	Bangkok, Thailand	Hong Kong	1–0	4–0	1984 Summer Olympics qualification
3	5 November 1983	Bangkok, Thailand	Hong Kong	3–0	4–0	1984 Summer Olympics qualification
4	5 November 1983	Bangkok, Thailand	Hong Kong	4–0	4–0	1984 Summer Olympics qualification
5	10 November 1983	Bangkok, Thailand	Hong Kong	2–0	2–0	1984 Summer Olympics qualification
6	10 December 1985	Guadalajara, Mexico	Mexico	1–0	1–2	Mexico Tournament
7	13 December 1985	Nezahualcoyotl, Mexico	Algeria	1–0	2–0	Mexico Tournament
8	6 June 1986	Mexico City, Mexico	Bulgaria	1–1	1–1	1986 FIFA World Cup

== Honours ==
=== Player ===
Korea University

- Korean National Championship: 1985

POSCO Atoms

- K League 1: 1988

Daewoo Royals

- K League 1: 1991

Ilhwa Chunma

- K League 1: 1993, 1994

South Korea

- Dynasty Cup: 1990

Individual

- Korean FA Most Valuable Player: 1983
- Korean FA Best XI: 1983, 1984, 1985
- K League 1 top assist provider: 1988

=== Manager ===
Hwaseong FC

- K3 League: 2014

Gyeongnam FC

- K League 2: 2017

Individual

- K3 League Best Manager: 2014
- K League Manager of the Month: April 2017, July 2018
- K League 2 Manager of the Year: 2017
