= Choi Kang-hee =

Choi Kang-hee (Korean: 최강희) may refer to:

- Choi Kang-hee (footballer) (born 1959), South Korean footballer
- Choi Kang-hee (actress) (born 1977), South Korean actress
