= Se-yeon =

- Hangul: 세연
- RR: Seyeon
- MR: Seyŏn

Se-yeon is a Korean given name.

People with this name include:

- Jin Se-yeon (born 1994), South Korean actress
- Kim Se-yeon (born 1999), better known as Geguri, South Korean video game player
- Lee Se-yeon, South Korean former footballer

Fictional characters with this name include:

- Kang Se-yeon, in 2006 South Korean television series Lovers
- Oh Se-yeon, in 2018 South Korean television series Rich Man
- Go Se-yeon, in 2019 South Korean television series Abyss
- Jung Se-yeon, in 2020 South Korean television series True Beauty

== See also ==
- List of Korean given names
