= K League Manager of the Year Award =

The K League Manager of the Year Award is a football award for managers (head coaches) in K League. The award is given to the manager deemed the most valuable manager in the league each season.

== Winners ==
=== K League 1 award ===
Season	Manager	Club
1983	(South Korea) Ham Heung-chul	Hallelujah FC
1984	(South Korea) Chang Woon-soo	Daewoo Royals
1985	(South Korea) Park Se-hak	Lucky-Goldstar Hwangso
1986	(South Korea) Choi Eun-taek	POSCO Atoms
1987	(South Korea) Lee Cha-man	Daewoo Royals
1988	(South Korea) Lee Hoe-taik	POSCO Atoms
1989	(South Korea) Kim Jung-nam	Yukong Elephants
1990	(South Korea) Ko Jae-wook	Lucky-Goldstar Hwangso
1991	(Hungary) Bertalan Bicskei	Daewoo Royals
1992	(South Korea) Lee Hoe-taik (2)	POSCO Atoms
1993	(South Korea) Park Jong-hwan	Ilhwa Chunma
1994	(South Korea) Park Jong-hwan (2)	Ilhwa Chunma
1995	(South Korea) Park Jong-hwan (3)	Ilhwa Chunma
1996	(South Korea) Ko Jae-wook (2)	Ulsan Hyundai Horangi
1997	(South Korea) Lee Cha-man (2)	Busan Daewoo Royals
1998	(South Korea) Kim Ho	Suwon Samsung Bluewings
1999	(South Korea) Kim Ho (2)	Suwon Samsung Bluewings
2000	(South Korea) Cho Kwang-rae	Anyang LG Cheetahs
2001	(South Korea) Cha Kyung-bok	Seongnam Ilhwa Chunma
2002	(South Korea) Cha Kyung-bok (2)	Seongnam Ilhwa Chunma
2003	(South Korea) Cha Kyung-bok (3)	Seongnam Ilhwa Chunma
2004	(South Korea) Cha Bum-kun	Suwon Samsung Bluewings
2005	(South Korea) Chang Woe-ryong	Incheon United
2006	(South Korea) Kim Hak-bum	Seongnam Ilhwa Chunma
2007	(Brazil) Sérgio Farias	Pohang Steelers
2008	(South Korea) Cha Bum-kun (2)	Suwon Samsung Bluewings
2009	(South Korea) Choi Kang-hee	Jeonbuk Hyundai Motors
2010	(South Korea) Park Kyung-hoon	Jeju United
2011	(South Korea) Choi Kang-hee (2)	Jeonbuk Hyundai Motors
2012	(South Korea) Choi Yong-soo	FC Seoul
2013	(South Korea) Hwang Sun-hong	Pohang Steelers
2014	(South Korea) Choi Kang-hee (3)	Jeonbuk Hyundai Motors
2015	(South Korea) Choi Kang-hee (4)	Jeonbuk Hyundai Motors
2016	(South Korea) Hwang Sun-hong (2)	FC Seoul
2017	(South Korea) Choi Kang-hee (5)	Jeonbuk Hyundai Motors
2018	(South Korea) Choi Kang-hee (6)	Jeonbuk Hyundai Motors
2019	(Portugal) José Morais	Jeonbuk Hyundai Motors
2020	(South Korea) Kim Gi-dong	Pohang Steelers
2021	(South Korea) Kim Sang-sik	Jeonbuk Hyundai Motors
2022	(South Korea) Hong Myung-bo	Ulsan Hyundai
2023	(South Korea) Hong Myung-bo (2)	Ulsan Hyundai
2024	(South Korea) Yoon Jong-hwan	Gangwon FC
2025	(Uruguay) Gus Poyet	Jeonbuk Hyundai Motors

=== K League 2 award ===
Season	Manager	Club
2013	(South Korea) Park Hang-seo	Sangju Sangmu
2014	(South Korea) Cho Jin-ho	Daejeon Citizen
2015	(South Korea) Cho Duck-je	Suwon FC
2016	(South Korea) Son Hyun-jun (Note: Won the award as a caretaker manager.)	Daegu FC
2017	(South Korea) Kim Jong-boo	Gyeongnam FC
2018	(South Korea) Park Dong-hyuk	Asan Mugunghwa
2019	(South Korea) Park Jin-sub	Gwangju FC
2020	(South Korea) Nam Ki-il	Jeju United
2021	(South Korea) Kim Tae-wan	Gimcheon Sangmu
2022	(South Korea) Lee Jung-hyo	Gwangju FC
2023	(South Korea) Ko Jeong-woon	Gimpo FC
2024	(South Korea) Ryu Byeong-hoon	FC Anyang
2025	(South Korea) Yoon Jong-hwan	Incheon United

== See also ==
- K League
- K League MVP Award
- K League Top Scorer Award
- K League Top Assist Provider Award
- K League Young Player of the Year Award
- K League FANtastic Player
- K League Best XI
- K League Players' Player of the Year
