= Choi Jong-duk =

South Korean footballer (born 1954)

Personal information
- Full name: Choi Jong-duk
- Date of birth: 24 June 1954 (age 72)
- Place of birth: Seosan, Chungnam, South Korea
- Position: Full-back

College career
Years	Team	Apps	(Gls)
1974–1977	Korea University		

Senior career*
Years	Team	Apps	(Gls)
1978–1981	POSCO FC		
1979–1980	→ ROK Army (draft)		
1981–1982	Sea Bee		
1983–1984	Hallelujah FC	41	(4)
1985	Lucky-Goldstar Hwangso	17	(1)
Total		58	(5)

International career
1973–1974	South Korea U20		
1975–1981	South Korea	98	(9)
Medal record
Representing South Korea
Men's football
Asian Games
Gold medal – first place	1978 Bangkok
AFC Asian Cup
Runner-up	1980 Kuwait
AFC Youth Championship
Bronze medal – third place	1973 Iran
Bronze medal – third place	1974 Thailand
- * Club domestic league appearances and goals

- Choi Jong-duk
- Hangul: 최종덕
- Hanja: 崔鍾德
- RR: Choe Jongdeok
- MR: Ch'oe Chongdŏk

Choi Jong-duk (born 24 June 1954) is a former South Korean coach and footballer who played as a full-back. He is a gold medalist of the 1978 Asian Games.

== Honours ==
Korea University

- Korean National Championship: 1974, 1976
- Korean President's Cup runner-up: 1976

ROK Army

- Korean National Semipro League (Spring): 1980
- Korean National Championship: 1979
- Korean President's Cup runner-up: 1980

Sea Bee

- Hong Kong FA Cup runner-up: 1981–82

Hallelujah FC

- K League 1: 1983

Lucky-Goldstar Hwangso

- K League 1: 1985

South Korea U20

- AFC Youth Championship third place: 1973, 1974

South Korea

- Asian Games: 1978
- AFC Asian Cup runner-up: 1980

Individual

- Korean National Championship Best Player: 1974
- Korean FA Best XI: 1975, 1976, 1977, 1980
- Korean FA Most Valuable Player: 1976
