= South Korean Footballer of the Year =

South Korean football award

The South Korean Footballer of the Year, officially known as Korea Football Association Player of the Year, is an annual award presented to the best South Korean football player in a calendar year by Korea Football Association (KFA).

== KASA Best Footballer ==
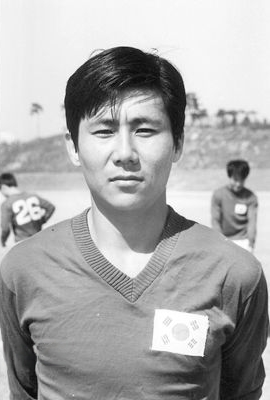
Kim Jung-nam received the citation of KASA twice.

The KFA recommended the best Korean footballer of the year, who would be awarded a citation by the Korea Amateur Sports Association (KASA), from 1957 to 1972.

Year	Player	Club	Ref.
1957	Kim Dong-geun	ROK Marine Corps	
1958	Kim Ji-sung	ROK Army CIC	
1959	Woo Sang-kwon	ROK Army OPMG	
1960	Moon Jung-sik	ROK Army CIC	
1961	Ham Heung-chul	ROK Army OPMG	
1962	Jeong Sun-cheon	ROK Army CIC	
1963	Not awarded		
1964	Not awarded		
1965	Cho Sung-dal	Korea Electric Power	
1966	Unknown		
1967	Huh Yoon-jung	Yangzee	
1968	Seo Yoon-chan	Yangzee	
1969	Kim Jung-nam	Yangzee	
1970	Kim Jung-nam (2)	Korea Exchange Bank	
1971	Kim Ho	Commercial Bank of Korea	
1972	Park Lee-chun	Kookmin Bank	

== Most Valuable Player ==
South Korean journalists selected the best players from 1969 to 1984 under the KFA. The KFA also chose the best players in some other years by itself.

Year	Player	Club	Ref.
1965	Cho Yoon-ok	Korea Tungsten	
1966	Unknown		
1967	Unknown		
1968	Unknown		
1969	Kim Ho	Commercial Bank of Korea	
1970	Lee Hoe-taik	Hanyang University	
1971	Kim Jung-nam	Korea Exchange Bank	
1972	Park Lee-chun	Kookmin Bank	
1973	Cha Bum-kun	Korea University	
1974	Byun Ho-young	Seoul Bank	
1975	Kim Ho-kon	ROK Army	
1976	Choi Jong-duk	Korea University	
1977	Cho Young-jeung	ROK Navy	
1978	Kim Jae-han	Korea Housing Bank	
1979	Park Sung-hwa	ROK Army	
1980	Lee Young-moo	Hallelujah FC	
1981	Cho Kwang-rae	Daewoo FC	
1982	Not awarded		
1983	Kim Jong-boo	Korea University	
1984	Huh Jung-moo	Hyundai Horang-i	
1985	Chung Yong-hwan	Daewoo Royals	
1986	Unknown		
1987	Unknown		
1988	Chung Yong-hwan (2)	Daewoo Royals	
1989	Unknown		
1990	Choi Soon-ho	Lucky-Goldstar Hwangso	
1991	Kim Joo-sung	Daewoo Royals	

== Fans' Player of the Year ==
The KFA held an annual poll to select Korean fans' best player in its website from 2003 to 2015.

Year	Player	Club	Ref.
2003	Ahn Jung-hwan	(Japan) Shimizu S-Pulse	
2004	Not awarded		
2005	Not awarded		
2006	Seol Ki-hyeon	(England) Reading	
2007	Not awarded		
2008	Not awarded		
2009	Not awarded		
2010	Park Ji-sung	(England) Manchester United	
2011	Ki Sung-yueng	(Scotland) Celtic	
2012	Ki Sung-yueng (2)	(Wales) Swansea City	
2013	Lee Chung-yong	(England) Bolton Wanderers	
2014	Son Heung-min	(Germany) Bayer Leverkusen	
2015	Son Heung-min (2)	(England) Tottenham Hotspur	

== Player of the Year ==
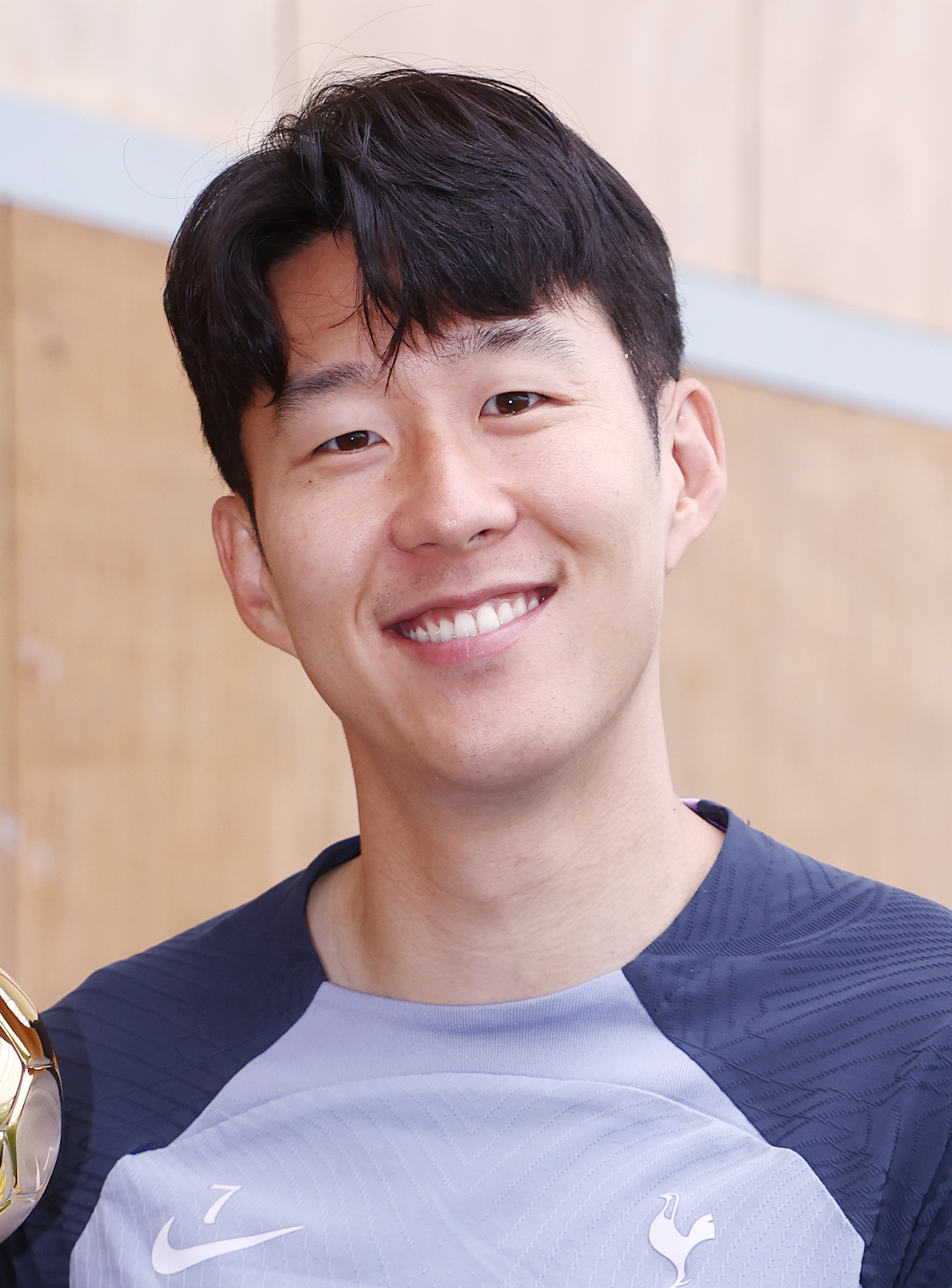
Son Heung-min won the Player of the Year award eight times.

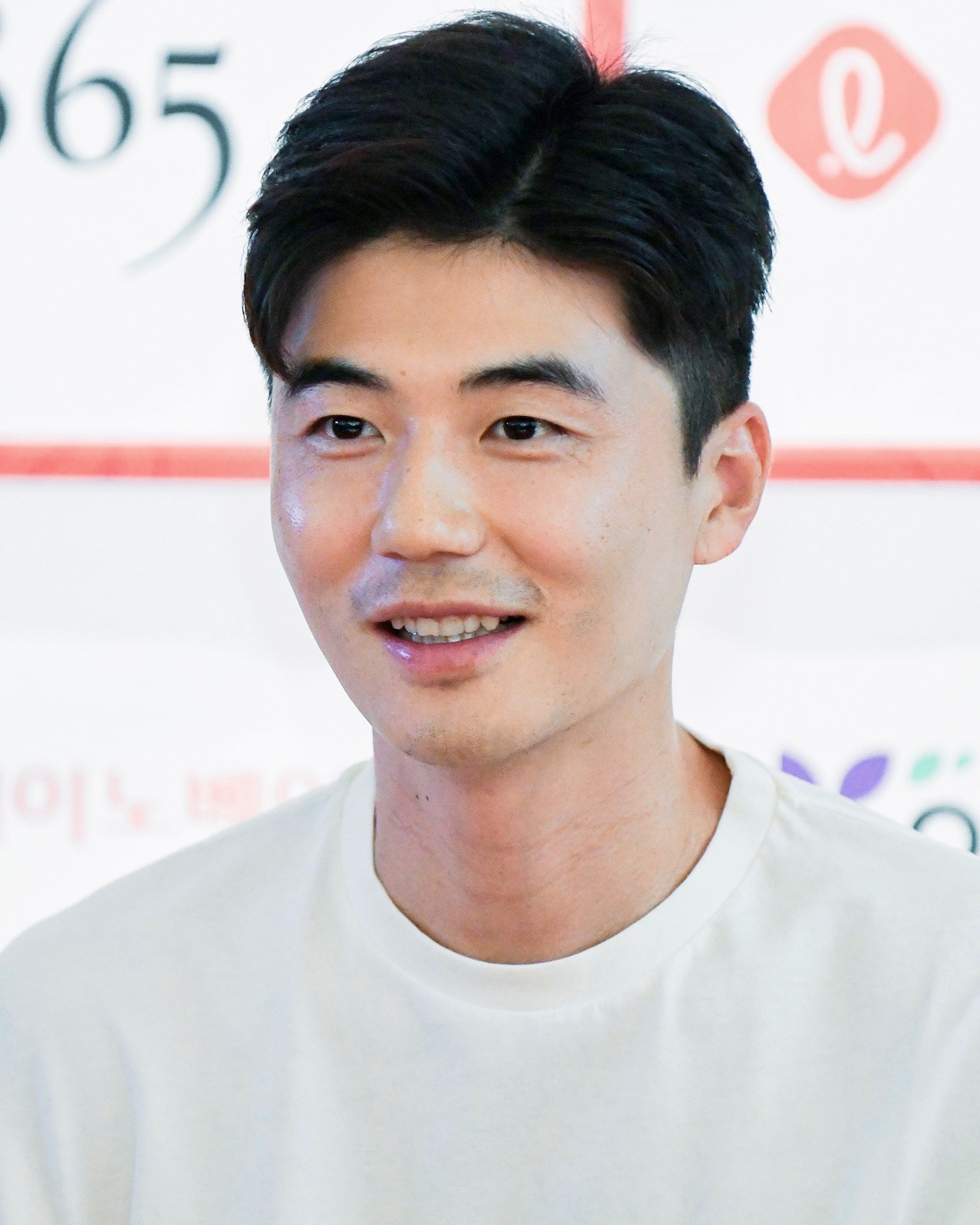
Ki Sung-yueng won the Player of the Year award three times.

The KFA members and South Korean journalists have voted for annual best Korean players since 2010.

Year	Player	Club	Ref.
2010	Park Ji-sung	(England) Manchester United	
2011	Ki Sung-yueng	(Scotland) Celtic	
2012	Ki Sung-yueng (2)	(Wales) Swansea City	
2013	Son Heung-min	(Germany) Bayer Leverkusen	
2014	Son Heung-min (2)	(Germany) Bayer Leverkusen	
2015	Kim Young-gwon	(China) Guangzhou Evergrande	
2016	Ki Sung-yueng (3)	(Wales) Swansea City	
2017	Son Heung-min (3)	(England) Tottenham Hotspur	
2018	Hwang Ui-jo	(Japan) Gamba Osaka	
2019	Son Heung-min (4)	(England) Tottenham Hotspur	
2020	Son Heung-min (5)	(England) Tottenham Hotspur	
2021	Son Heung-min (6)	(England) Tottenham Hotspur	
2022	Son Heung-min (7)	(England) Tottenham Hotspur	
2023	Kim Min-jae	(Germany) Bayern Munich	
2024	Son Heung-min (8)	(England) Tottenham Hotspur	
2025	Lee Kang-in	(France) Paris Saint-Germain	

== See also ==
- KFA Awards
