= Kwon Yi-woon =

South Korean footballer (born 1950

Kwon Yi-woon 권이운
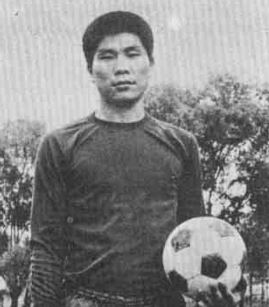
- Kwon in 1972

Personal information
- Full name: Kwon Yi-woon
- Date of birth: December 26, 1950 (age 75)
- Place of birth: Gunsan, North Jeolla Province South Korea
- Height: 1.73 m (5 ft 8 in)
- Position: Goalkeeper

Youth career
- Dongbuk High School FC

Senior career*
Years	Team	Apps	(Gls)
1966–1968	Yangzee		
1970–1975	→ ROK Army (draft)		
1976–1979	Industrial Bank of Korea		

International career
1972–1976	South Korea		
Medal record
Men's football
Representing South Korea
AFC Asian Cup
Silver medal – second place	1972 Thailand	Team
- * Club domestic league appearances and goals

- Kwon Yi-woon
- Hangul: 권이운
- Hanja: 權彝運
- RR: Gwon Iun
- MR: Kwŏn Iun

Kwon Yi-woon (Korean: 권이운; born December 26, 1950) is a retired South Korean footballer who played as a goalkeeper. He represented South Korea at the 1972 AFC Asian Cup, 1974 Asian Games and the 1976 AFC Asian Cup qualifiers.

== Club career ==
Like with many South Korean youth footballers of the late 1960s, Kwon would move to Seoul to play for the local high schools of the capital city.

== International career ==
The South Korea national football team of the 1970s would be often criticized for having goalkeepers of poor quality. Despite this, Kwon would be marked as an exception to this along with Kim Hwang-ho and Kim Hee-cheon. Following the failure of South Korea to qualify for the 1972 Summer Olympics, Kwon was selected to be one of three new goalkeepers in an attempt to improve and reform the team. He would be part of the runner-up squad for the 1972 AFC Asian Cup.

Kwon would be part of the South Korean squad for the 1974 Asian Games and after advancing to the Second Round, had recently been given a draw against Iraq on September 9 and was scheduled to play against Iran on September 11. The Iranians would play aggressively with Kwon failing to intercept the ball around the 38th minnute with a defender kicking the ball away at the last minute. Despite the South Korean team being somewhat more energetic around the second half of the match and attempting to score goals of their own, the Iranians would continue to play aggressively with an attempt made six minutes in by Ghafour Jahani and on the 74th minute, Gholam Hossein Mazloumi would score the first goal of the match after Kwon had failed to block the ball intime. Mazloumi would score again in the 86th minute from the right side of the goalpost, leaving the Korean defense dazed.
