= Lee Jong-hwan =

South Korean footballer, manager and administrator (born 1930)

Lee Jong-Hwan (born 1930) was a South Korean footballer and football administrator. He was the first manager of Jeju United FC and president of the Korea Football Association.
