= Chang Woon-soo =

South Korean football manager (1928–1992)

Personal information
- Full name: Chang Woon-soo
- Date of birth: 19 November 1928
- Place of birth: Chaeryong, Kōkai-dō, Korea, Empire of Japan
- Date of death: 28 December 1992 (aged 64)
- Place of death: Seoul, South Korea

College career
Years	Team	Apps	(Gls)
- Shinheung Junior College

Managerial career
- 1969: South Korea U20
- 1973: South Korea U20
- 1976–1980: Yonsei University
- 1981–1983: Daewoo Royals
- 1984–1986: Daewoo Royals
Medal record
Men's football
Representing South Korea (as manager)
AFC Youth Championship
Bronze medal – third place	1973 Iran

- Chang Woon-soo
- Hangul: 장운수
- RR: Jang Unsu
- MR: Chang Unsu

Chang Woon-soo (Korean: 장운수; 19 November 1928 – 28 December 1992) was a South Korean football manager.

== Managerial career ==
Chang mostly worked as a youth team manager, and managed football teams of Kyungshin Middle School, Kyungshin High School, Gyeseong High School and Yonsei University. He nurtured a considerable number of national team players and was famous for discovering and teaching Cha Bum-kun, one of the greatest Asian footballers of all time.

Chang was appointed manager of semi-professional club Daewoo FC in 1981 after leading Yonsei University to three domestic titles in the previous year, including senior tournament Korean President's Cup. In his first season at Daewoo, he won the spring league and was selected as the best manager of the league. Daewoo was reorganized as professional team Daewoo Royals in 1983, with it joining the K League. He conceded the K League title to Hallelujah FC by one point in his first professional season.

Chang was appointed Daewoo's general director before the next season, but returned to managerial position just after half a year due to his successor Cho Yoon-ok's poor results. He successfully finished the rest of the season, winning the 1984 K League and the K League Manager of the Year Award. He also led Daewoo to the 1985–86 Asian Club Championship title, making them become the first South Korean club to win the AFC Champions League (Asian Club Championship at the time).

== Honours ==
=== Manager ===
South Korea U20

- AFC Youth Championship third place: 1973

Yonsei University

- Korean President's Cup: 1980

Daewoo Royals

- Asian Club Championship: 1985–86
- K League 1: 1984
- Korean National Semipro League (Spring): 1981
- Korean President's Cup runner-up: 1981

Individual

- Korean President's Cup Best Manager: 1980
- Korean National Semipro League (Spring) Best Manager: 1981
- K League 1 Manager of the Year: 1984
