= Park Sung-hwa =

South Korean footballer and manager (born 1955)

Personal information
- Full name: Park Sung-hwa
- Date of birth: 7 May 1955 (age 71)
- Place of birth: Ulsan, South Korea
- Height: 1.78 m (5 ft 10 in)
- Position: Centre-back

College career
Years	Team	Apps	(Gls)
1974–1977	Korea University		

Senior career*
Years	Team	Apps	(Gls)
1978–1979	POSCO FC		
1980–1981	ROK Army (draft)		
1982–1985	Hallelujah FC	37	(9)
1986–1987	POSCO Atoms	32	(0)
Total		69	(9)

International career
1975	South Korea U20		
1975–1984	South Korea	107	(26)

Managerial career
- 1992–1994: Yukong Elephants
- 1996–2000: Pohang Steelers
- 2001–2005: South Korea U20
- 2004: South Korea (caretaker)
- 2007: Busan IPark
- 2007–2008: South Korea U23
- 2010–2011: Dalian Shide
- 2011–2013: Myanmar
- 2012–2013: Myanmar U23
- 2015: Gyeongnam FC
Medal record
Men's football
Representing South Korea (as player)
Asian Games
Gold medal – first place	1978 Bangkok
AFC Asian Cup
Runner-up	1980 Kuwait
Representing South Korea (as manager)
AFC Youth Championship
Winner	2002 Qatar
Winner	2004 Malaysia
- * Club domestic league appearances and goals

- Park Sung-hwa
- Hangul: 박성화
- Hanja: 朴成華
- RR: Bak Seonghwa
- MR: Pak Sŏnghwa

Park Sung-hwa (Korean: 박성화; born 7 May 1955) is a South Korean football manager and a former player. He is a gold medalist of the 1978 Asian Games.

== Playing career ==
Park played Handball until he attended middle school, but started playing football at Dongnae High School. His jumping ability made him a notable youth footballer. He was called up to the South Korea national youth team, but could not play as a youth international due to the refusal of his school.

After entering Korea University, Park played for the university's football team at the 1974 Korean President's Cup. He successfully overwhelmed 1.9-m-tall forward Kim Jae-han in a 1–0 win over Korea Housing Bank despite his 1.77-m height, receiving attention again from the Korea Football Association. That year, he was selected for the national B team, playing Merdeka Tournament matches.

Park played for the senior national team in the qualifiers of the 1976 Summer Olympics and the 1978 FIFA World Cup, but failed to qualify for both tournaments. Instead, he won a gold medal at the 1978 Asian Games after South Korea drew with North Korea without a goal in the final. China mostly attempted aerial duels against South Korea in the second group stage before medal matches, and this tactical decision was unsuccessful due to Park's existence.

When K League's inaugural season was held in 1983, Park received the Most Valuable Player award with his team Hallelujah FC winning the league title.

== Managerial career ==
=== Yukong Elephants ===
After retiring as a player at the end of the 1987 season, Park worked as a coach at K League club Hyundai Horang-i from 1989 to 1991. He moved to the same league's Yukong Elephants prior to the 1992 season, and was appointed their caretaker manager in May when predecessor Kim Jung-nam resigned for poor results. At the end of the season, Yukong finished bottom of the league, but signed a permanent contract with Park. In September 1994, he left the club, being replaced by Valery Nepomnyashchy.

=== Pohang Steelers ===
Park managed Pohang Steelers from 1996 to 2000 after studying in England for a year. He led Pohang to win two consecutive Asian Club Championship titles in the 1996–97 and 1997–98 seasons.

=== South Korea U20 ===
Park became the manager of the South Korea under-20 team in November 2001, and led them to win two successive AFC Youth Championship titles in 2002 and 2004. In contrast with the results in Asia, his team had difficulty dominating opposing teams at the FIFA World Youth Championship, being eliminated in the round of 16 and the group stage at the 2003 and 2005 tournaments respectively.

=== South Korea U23 ===
Park signed for K League side Busan IPark in July 2007, but left for the South Korea under-23 team 17 days after the signing. His team succeeded in qualifying for the 2008 Summer Olympics by finishing first in their group of the qualifying tournament, but was criticised for scoring only four goals in six matches. During the Olympics, his team finished third with four points in the Group D, where they drew 1–1 with Cameroon, lost 3–0 to Italy and defeated Honduras 1–0.

=== Myanmar ===
Park managed Chinese Super League club Dalian Shide since June 2010, but was sacked for earning only eight points in nine matches during the 2011 season. His next destination was Myanmar where he was in charge of their senior and under-23 teams until 2013. He was sacked for his fatal illusion at the 2013 SEA Games. He was mistaken about the tournament's tiebreaker, giving the main players a break in the last group stage match against Indonesia, which was three points and a large goal difference behind Myanmar. However, the tournament priortised head-to-head record, and a 1–0 defeat to Indonesia made them go out of the tournament. The tournament was held by Myanmar, but he did not know the fact.

== Career statistics ==
=== International ===
Results list South Korea's goal tally first.

List of international goals scored by Park Sung-hwa
No.	Date	Venue	Opponent	Score	Result	Competition
1	29 July 1975	Kuala Lumpur, Malaysia	Malaysia	3–0	3–1	1975 Pestabola Merdeka
2	11 August 1975	Kuala Lumpur, Malaysia	Indonesia	5–0	5–1	1975 Pestabola Merdeka
3	15 August 1975	Kuala Lumpur, Malaysia	Bangladesh	2–0	4–0	1975 Pestabola Merdeka
4	15 August 1975	Kuala Lumpur, Malaysia	Bangladesh	3–0	4–0	1975 Pestabola Merdeka
5	17 December 1976	Bangkok, Thailand	Singapore	2–0	4–0	1976 King's Cup
6	17 December 1976	Bangkok, Thailand	Singapore	3–0	4–0	1976 King's Cup
7	17 December 1976	Bangkok, Thailand	Singapore	4–0	4–0	1976 King's Cup
8	19 July 1978	Kuala Lumpur, Malaysia	Japan	3–0	4–0	1978 Pestabola Merdeka
9	27 July 1978	Kuala Lumpur, Malaysia	Syria	1–0	2–0	1978 Pestabola Merdeka
10	27 July 1978	Kuala Lumpur, Malaysia	Syria	2–0	2–0	1978 Pestabola Merdeka
11	14 December 1978	Bangkok, Thailand	Japan	2–0	3–1	1978 Asian Games
12	27 December 1978	Manila, Philippines	Philippines	3–0	5–0	1980 AFC Asian Cup qualification
13	16 June 1979	Seoul, South Korea	Japan	1–0	4–1	Friendly
14	16 June 1979	Seoul, South Korea	Japan	2–0	4–1	Friendly
15	16 June 1979	Seoul, South Korea	Japan	3–1	4–1	Friendly
16	8 September 1979	Seoul, South Korea	Sudan	1–0	8–0	1979 Korea Cup
17	8 September 1979	Seoul, South Korea	Sudan	5–0	8–0	1979 Korea Cup
18	14 September 1979	Seoul, South Korea	Bahrain	1–0	5–1	1979 Korea Cup
19	16 September 1979	Incheon, South Korea	Bangladesh	2–0	9–0	1979 Korea Cup
20	16 September 1979	Incheon, South Korea	Bangladesh	3–0	9–0	1979 Korea Cup
21	10 October 1984	Calcutta, India	North Yemen	?–0	6–0	1984 AFC Asian Cup qualification
22	10 October 1984	Calcutta, India	North Yemen	?–0	6–0	1984 AFC Asian Cup qualification
23	10 October 1984	Calcutta, India	North Yemen	?–0	6–0	1984 AFC Asian Cup qualification
24	10 October 1984	Calcutta, India	North Yemen	?–0	6–0	1984 AFC Asian Cup qualification
25	13 October 1984	Calcutta, India	Pakistan	?–0	6–0	1984 AFC Asian Cup qualification
26	13 October 1984	Calcutta, India	Pakistan	?–0	6–0	1984 AFC Asian Cup qualification

== Honours ==
=== Player ===
Korea University

- Korean National Championship: 1974, 1976
- Korean President's Cup runner-up: 1976

ROK Army

- Korean National Semipro League (Spring): 1980
- Korean President's Cup runner-up: 1980

Hallelujah FC

- K League 1: 1983

POSCO Atoms

- K League 1: 1986

South Korea

- Asian Games: 1978

Individual

- Korean National Championship Best Player: 1976
- Korean FA Best XI: 1976, 1977, 1978, 1979, 1981, 1983, 1984
- Korean President's Cup top goalscorer: 1977
- Korean FA Most Valuable Player: 1979
- K League 1 Most Valuable Player: 1983
- K League 1 Best XI: 1983, 1984
- AFC Asian All-Star: 1985
- K League '80s All-Star Team: 2003

=== Manager ===
Yukong Elephants

- Korean League Cup: 1994

Pohang Steelers

- Korean FA Cup: 1996
- Korean League Cup runner-up: 1996, 1997+
- Asian Club Championship: 1996–97, 1997–98

South Korea U20

- AFC Youth Championship: 2002, 2004

Individual

- AFC Coach of the Month: February 1998, April 1998

== See also ==
- List of men's footballers with 100 or more international caps
