= Kim Ho-kon =

South Korean football player and manager (born 1951)

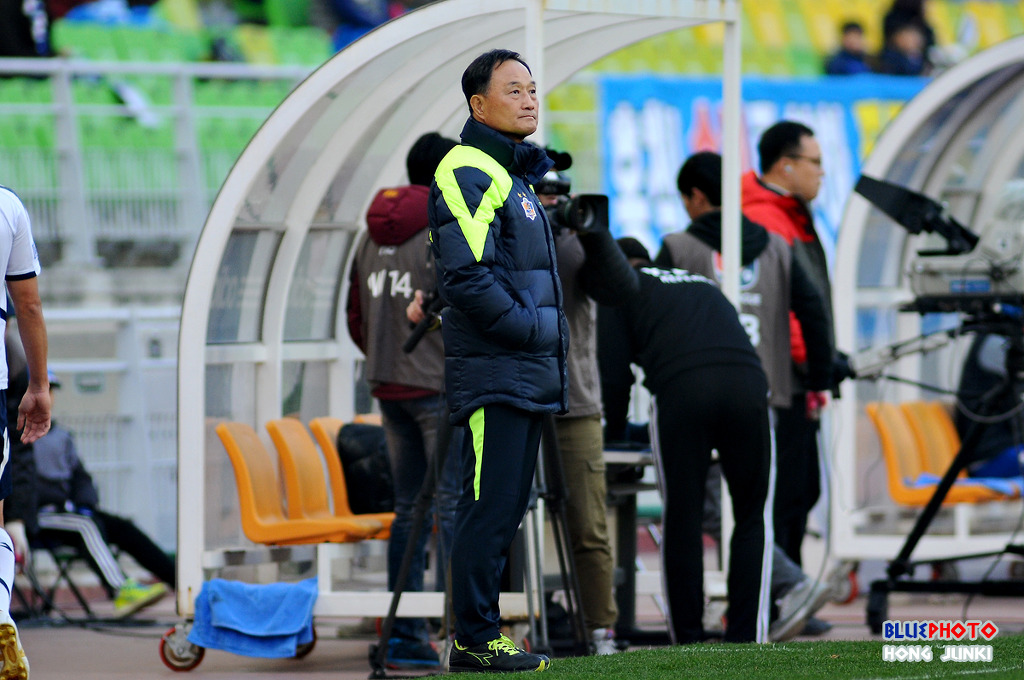
- Kim in 2013

Personal information
- Full name: Kim Ho-kon
- Date of birth: 26 March 1951 (age 75)
- Place of birth: Tongyeong, Gyeongnam, South Korea
- Height: 1.72 m (5 ft 8 in)
- Position: Defender

College career
Years	Team	Apps	(Gls)
1971–1974	Yonsei University		

Senior career*
Years	Team	Apps	(Gls)
1969–1970	Commercial Bank of Korea		
1975	Korea Trust Bank		
1975–1976	ROK Army (draft)		
1976–1982	Seoul Trust Bank		

International career
1969–1971	South Korea U20		
1971–1979	South Korea	124	(5)

Managerial career
- 1980–1982: South Korea (assistant)
- 1983–1987: Hyundai Horang-i (assistant)
- 1985–1986: South Korea (assistant)
- 1988: South Korea (assistant)
- 1991–1992: South Korea U23 (assistant)
- 1993–1999: Yonsei University
- 2000–2002: Busan IPark
- 2002: South Korea (caretaker)
- 2002–2004: South Korea U23
- 2009–2013: Ulsan Hyundai
Medal record
Men's football
Representing South Korea
Asian Games
Gold medal – first place	1978 Bangkok	Team
AFC Asian Cup
Silver medal – second place	1972 Thailand	Team
AFC Youth Championship
Silver medal – second place	1971 Japan	Team
Bronze medal – third place	1970 Philippines	Team
Korean name
Hangul	김호곤
Hanja	金鎬坤
RR	Gim Hogon
MR	Kim Hogon
- * Club domestic league appearances and goals

Kim Ho-kon (Korean: 김호곤; born 26 March 1951) is a South Korean football manager and former football player who played as a sweeper or right back. He was the captain of the South Korea national football team in the 1978 Asian Games where they won the gold medal. He also managed Ulsan Hyundai from 2009 to 2013, and was noted for his attractive tactics, nicknamed the "Iron mace football" by showing a mortal blow during the defensive play. In 2012, he won the 2012 AFC Champions League, and was named the Asian Coach of the Year. However, he resigned from the team after coming a close second in the 2013 K League 1.

== Honours ==
=== Player ===
Commercial Bank of Korea

- Korean President's Cup: 1970

Yonsei University

- Korean National Championship runner-up: 1974

ROK Army

- Korean National Championship: 1975
- Korean President's Cup: 1975

South Korea U20

- AFC Youth Championship runner-up: 1971

South Korea

- Asian Games: 1978
- AFC Asian Cup runner-up: 1972

Individual

- Korean FA Best XI: 1972, 1973, 1974, 1975, 1976, 1977, 1978, 1979
- Korean FA Most Valuable Player: 1975
- MasterCard Asian/Oceanian Team of the 20th Century: 1998

=== Manager ===
Ulsan Hyundai

- Korean League Cup: 2011
- AFC Champions League: 2012

Individual

- K League All-Star: 2001
- AFC Coach of the Year: 2012

== See also ==
- List of men's footballers with 100 or more international caps

Awards and achievements
Preceded by Jorge Fossati	AFC Champions League Winning Coach; 2012	Succeeded by Marcello Lippi
