= Choi Kang-hee (footballer) =

South Korean footballer and manager (born 1959)

Personal information
- Full name: Choi Kang-hee
- Date of birth: 12 April 1959 (age 67)
- Place of birth: Yangpyeong, Gyeonggi, South Korea
- Height: 1.75 m (5 ft 9 in)
- Position: Right-back

Senior career*
Years	Team	Apps	(Gls)
1979	Hanil Bank		
1980–1982	ROK Army (draft)		
1983	POSCO Dolphins	3	(0)
1984–1992	Hyundai Horang-i	184	(10)
Total		187	(10)

International career
1987	South Korea B		
1988–1992	South Korea	33	(0)

Managerial career
- 2005–2011: Jeonbuk Hyundai Motors
- 2011–2013: South Korea
- 2013–2018: Jeonbuk Hyundai Motors
- 2018–2019: Tianjin Quanjian
- 2019: Dalian Yifang
- 2019–2021: Shanghai Shenhua
- 2023–2025: Shandong Taishan
Medal record
Men's football
Representing South Korea
AFC Asian Cup
Silver medal – second place	1988 Qatar	Team
- * Club domestic league appearances and goals

Choi Kang-hee (Korean: 최강희; Hanja: 崔康熙; born 12 April 1959) is a South Korean football manager and former player.

== Club career ==
Choi played for Hanil Bank and Army FC in the Korean Semi-professional League. After he accomplished his military service in ROK Army, South Korea's professional league (K League) was founded at a similar time, and he started his professional career by joining a K League club POSCO Dolphins. However, he transferred to Hyundai Horang-i after hearing the news of its foundation. He became a founding member of Hyundai Horang-i, and spent the rest of his playing career in there. He retired at the end of the 1992 season after a row with the club's manager Cha Bum-kun over Cha's training methods.

== International career ==
Choi was called up to the South Korean national team for the 1988 Summer Olympics. He played all three games, but South Korea were knocked out of the group stage in the Olympics. He was also included in South Korea's squad that came runners-up to Saudi Arabia in the 1988 AFC Asian Cup. He played three games in the Asian Cup.

Choi participated in the 1990 FIFA World Cup, playing three games for South Korea. However, South Korea failed to win a single game in the 1990 World Cup.

== Managerial career ==
The year after Choi retired as a player, he went to Leverkusen and Cologne in Germany to study football management. By 1996, he joined the coaching staff at Suwon Samsung Bluewings and then became an assistant to head coach Kim Ho as the club won the 2000–01 Asian Club Championship. He also became an assistant coach of the South Korean national team under Humberto Coelho.

Choi's first stint managing K League 1 side Jeonbuk Hyundai Motors lasted from 2005 to 2011. He focused on offensive tactics and transformed the team into one of the best in Asia. He led Jeonbuk to the K League 1 title in 2009 and 2011. He also won the AFC Champions League in 2006.

Choi repeatedly turned down offers to become South Korea national football team head coach after former coach Cho Kwang-rae was sacked. After being repeatedly offered the job, he finally accepted it on 21 December 2011. He insisted that his reign would only last until the end of World Cup qualifiers, saying, "I asked that [the contract only runs until June 2013]. What we need to do is qualify for the World Cup finals for the eighth time in a row... My mission is to take the national team to the finals. After that, a foreign coach should take over the team. If the KFA doesn't accept this, I won't sign the contract."

However, Choi's team showed poor performances in the final round (fourth round) of the 2014 FIFA World Cup qualification. While Cho managed the national team, they split into two factions, overseas clubs' players and K League players. Choi also failed to bring this team together, and received criticisms from the overseas players. South Korea narrowly qualified for the World Cup by finishing as runners-up in their group due to goal difference, although they were on the same points as third-placed team Uzbekistan.

Prior to the last qualifier against Iran in his country, Choi complained that Iran had provided poor training facilities and unfair treatments when his team had gone to Iran to play an away qualifier. Iran coach Carlos Queiroz hit back at this statement by claiming that Choi had humiliated the Iranian people and demanded an immediate apology. Instead, Choi said Iran seemed to make unnecessary provocations in desperation and that Queiroz would watch the World Cup on TV. Queiroz pinned the sad face of Choi on his black polo shirt and mocked him, and also offered to send Choi the jersey of Uzbek team as Choi said he would help Uzbekistan qualify for the World Cup finals over Iran. After Iran won this match, Queiroz showed his anger on Choi with a raised fist gesture which was deemed offensive by the Korean players and staff, almost causing a fight between the two teams.

Choi returned to Jeonbuk and led them to four more K League 1 titles in 2014, 2015, 2017 and 2018. He also led the team to its second AFC Champions League title in 2016. His successful career in Jeonbuk made him one of South Korea's most successful managers of all time, although his club caused controversy over bribing referees.

== Career statistics ==
=== Club ===
Appearances and goals by club, season and competition
Club	Season	League			National cup (Note: Includes Korean National Championship)		League cup		Other (Note: Includes Korean President's Cup)		Total	
Club	Season	Division	Apps	Goals	Apps	Goals	Apps	Goals	Apps	Goals	Apps	Goals
Hanil Bank	1979	Semipro League	?	?	?	?	—		?	?	?	?
ROK Army (draft)	1980	Semipro League	?	?	?	?	—		?	?	?	?
ROK Army (draft)	1981	Semipro League	?	?	?	?	—		?	?	?	?
ROK Army (draft)	1982	Semipro League	?	?	?	?	—		?	?	?	?
ROK Army (draft)	Total		?	?	?	?	—		?	?	?	?
POSCO Dolphins	1983	K League	3	0	—		—		—		3	0
Hyundai Horang-i	1984	K League	26	0	—		—		—		26	0
Hyundai Horang-i	1985	K League	21	0	—		—		—		21	0
Hyundai Horang-i	1986	K League	16	0	—		15	0	—		31	0
Hyundai Horang-i	1987	K League	25	3	—		—		—		25	3
Hyundai Horang-i	1988	K League	20	0	?	?	—		—		20	0
Hyundai Horang-i	1989	K League	9	0	?	?	—		—		9	0
Hyundai Horang-i	1990	K League	13	2	—		—		—		13	2
Hyundai Horang-i	1991	K League	37	5	—		—		—		37	5
Hyundai Horang-i	1992	K League	17	0	—		3	0	—		20	0
Hyundai Horang-i	Total		184	10	—		18	0	—		202	10
Career total			187	10	—		18	0	?	?	205	10

== Honours ==
=== Player ===
ROK Army

- Korean President's Cup runner-up: 1980

Hyundai Horang-i

- Korean League Cup: 1986
- Korean National Championship runner-up: 1989

South Korea

- AFC Asian Cup runner-up: 1988

Individual

- K League 1 Best XI: 1985, 1986, 1988, 1991
- Korean League Cup Best Player: 1986
- Korean FA Best XI: 1988
- K League All-Star: 1991, 1992
- K League '80s All-Star Team: 2003
- K League 30th Anniversary Best XI: 2013

=== Manager ===
Jeonbuk Hyundai Motors

- K League 1: 2009, 2011, 2014, 2015, 2017, 2018
- Korean FA Cup: 2005
- Korean League Cup runner-up: 2010
- AFC Champions League: 2006, 2016

Shanghai Shenhua

- Chinese FA Cup: 2019

Individual

- Korean FA Cup Best Manager: 2005
- K League 1 Manager of the Year: 2009, 2011, 2014, 2015, 2017, 2018
- K League All-Star: 2010, 2015
- K League Manager of the Month: October 2014, November 2014, April 2015, July 2015, July 2016, June 2017, April 2018
- AFC Coach of the Year: 2016
- Chinese Super League Coach of the Month: June 2023, July 2023
- Chinese Super League Coach of the Year: 2023
