= Byun Ho-young =

South Korean footballer

Personal information
- Full name: Byun Ho-young
- Date of birth: 19 October 1945 (age 81)
- Place of birth: Korea
- Height: 1.77 m (5 ft 10 in)
- Position: Goalkeeper

College career
Years	Team	Apps	(Gls)
1966–1969	Yonsei University		

Senior career*
Years	Team	Apps	(Gls)
1970–1975	Seoul Bank		
1975–1980	Seiko		
1980–1981	Bulova		
1981–1982	Sea Bee		

International career
1966	South Korea U20		
1971–1977	South Korea	34	(0)
- * Club domestic league appearances and goals

- Byun Ho-young
- Hangul: 변호영
- RR: Byeon Hoyeong
- MR: Pyŏn Hoyŏng

Byun Ho-young (Korean pronunciation: [pjʌn.ɦo.jʌŋ] or [pjʌn] [ho.jʌŋ]; born 19 October 1945) is a former South Korean footballer. He played as a goalkeeper for South Korean national team in the 1974 Asian Games. After retirement, he became the president of the South Korean expatriates' association in Hong Kong in 2008.

== Honours ==
Seiko

- Hong Kong First Division League: 1978–79, 1979–80
- Hong Kong FA Cup: 1975–76, 1977–78, 1979–80
- Hong Kong Senior Challenge Shield: 1975–76, 1976–77, 1978–79, 1979–80
- Hong Kong Viceroy Cup: 1977–78, 1978–79

Sea Bee

- Hong Kong FA Cup runner-up: 1981–82

Individual

- Korean FA Best XI: 1973, 1974
- Korean FA Most Valuable Player: 1974
