= Yoo Byung-ok =

South Korean footballer (born 1964)

Personal information
- Date of birth: 2 March 1964 (age 62)
- Place of birth: South Korea
- Height: 1.77 m (5 ft 9 1/2 in)
- Position: Defender

Youth career
- Hanyang University

Senior career*
Years	Team	Apps	(Gls)
1987–1991	POSCO Atoms	101	(0)
1992–1995	LG Cheetahs	82	(0)
Total		183	(0)

International career
1983	South Korea U-20	6	(0)
1984–1986	South Korea	28	(0)
- * Club domestic league appearances and goals

- Yoo Byung-ok
- Hangul: 유병옥
- RR: Yu Byeongok
- MR: Yu Pyŏngok

Yoo Byung-ok (born 2 March 1964) is a South Korean football defender who played for South Korea in the 1986 FIFA World Cup. He also played for Hanyang University.
