= Kim Ho =

South Korean footballer (born 1944)

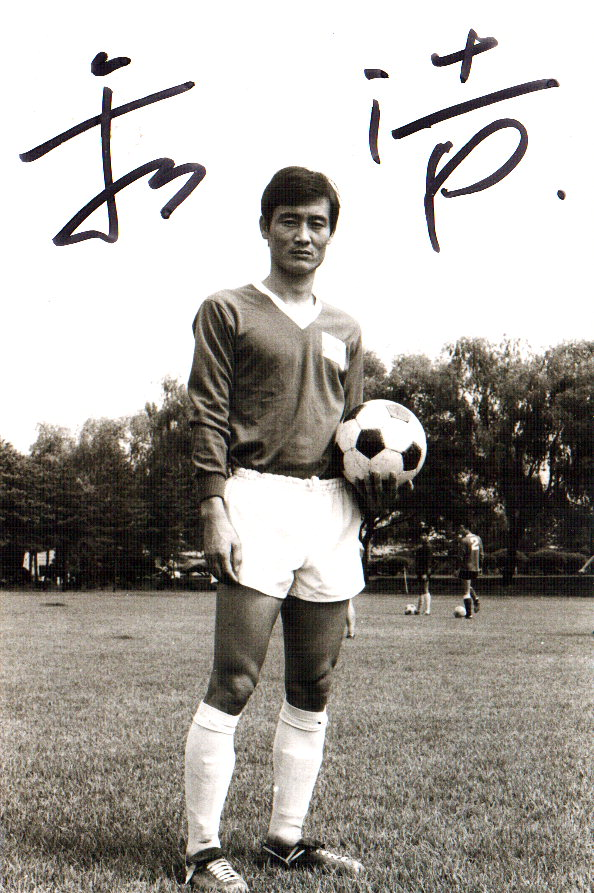
- Kim in 1972

Personal information
- Full name: Kim Ho
- Date of birth: 24 November 1944 (age 81)
- Place of birth: Tongyeong, Chūseinan-dō, Korea, Empire of Japan
- Height: 1.77 m (5 ft 9 1/2 in)
- Position: Centre-back

Youth career
- ?–?: Tongyeong Middle School
- ?–?: Jinju High School
- ?–?: Dongnae High School

Senior career*
| Years | Team | Apps | (Gls) |
| 1964–? | Cheil Industries | | |
| ?–1967 | ROK Marine Corps (draft) | | |
| 1967 | Yangzee | | |
| 1968 | Cheil Industries | | |
| 1969–1973 | Commercial Bank of Korea | | |
| 1974–1977 | POSCO FC | | |

International career
| 1966–1972 | South Korea | 84 | (0) |

Managerial career
- 1982–1987: Hanil Bank
- 1987: South Korea B
- 1988–1990: Hyundai Horang-i
- 1992–1994: South Korea
- 1995–2003: Suwon Samsung Bluewings
- 2007–2009: Daejeon Citizen
Medal record
Representing South Korea
Men's football
Asian Games
| Gold medal – first place | 1970 Bangkok |
AFC Asian Cup
| Runner-up | 1972 Thailand |
- * Club domestic league appearances and goals

- Korean name
- Hangul: 김호
- Hanja: 金皓
- RR: Gim Ho
- MR: Kim Ho

Kim Ho (Korean: 김호; born 24 November 1944) is a former South Korean football player and manager.

== Early life ==
Born in Tongyeong, a coastal city of South Korea, Kim started playing football in his hometown. He entered Tongyeong High School one year before transferring to Jinju High School, which had a football club. He experienced a dip in his performance at the new school, and again moved to another school, Dongnae High School in Busan. When graduating from Dongnae, he followed manager An Jong-soo who was appointed manager of the semi-professional club Cheil Industries at the same time.

== International career ==
Kim originally played as a right-back, but he showed his best performance after changing his position to centre-back. His defense was rough and daring, but successfully harmonised with his partner Kim Jung-nam. The centre-back duo led South Korea to win the 1970 Asian Games.

== Managerial career ==
=== Early career ===
In 1978, Kim started his managerial career at his alma mater Dongnae High School after retiring as a player. While managing Dongnae in 1979, he simultaneously participated at the FIFA World Youth Championship as a coach of the South Korea under-20 team.

On 30 November 1981, Kim was appointed manager of semi-professional club Hanil Bank. In 1983, Hanil Bank won the Korean National Semi-professional League under him, being promoted to the K League. However, Hanil Bank was relegated to the Semi-professional League when the K League was completely professionalised in 1987, and he decided to move to another K League club Hyundai Horang-i the next year.

Kim led Hyundai to finish second out of six clubs in his first season, but fell to sixth and fifth place in two subsequent seasons. At the end of the 1990 season, he resigned from the team and was replaced by Cha Bum-kun.

=== South Korea ===
On 8 July 1992, Kim signed a two-year contract with the Korea Football Association, becoming the first-ever full-time manager of the South Korea national team, which had appointed managers who had been managing other teams. In October 1993, he succeeded in qualifying for the 1994 FIFA World Cup, but was criticised for his poor process in the qualifiers. South Korean fans required the association to replace Kim with Park Jong-hwan, but it was decided to keep Kim at a meeting of the association on 17 November.

Prior to the 1994 FIFA World Cup, Kim set a target of advancing to the round of 16. South Korea drew 2–2 with Spain and 0–0 with Bolivia, earning two points in their first two matches. They then conceded three goals due to goalkeeper Choi In-young's poor performance during the first half of the last group stage match against defending champions Germany. After substituting the goalkeeper at half-time, they scored two goals before the match ended in a 3–2 defeat. Kim left the team after being eliminated in the group stage.

=== Suwon Samsung Bluewings ===
On 22 February 1995, Samsung announced the establishment of their football club Suwon Samsung Bluewings, and appointed Kim as the first manager of the club. He lifted 13 trophies including two K League titles and two Asian Club Championship titles for eight seasons at Suwon until he announced his retirement at the end of the 2003 season. He also discovered and nurtured young talents called the "Kim Ho's Children". Many of his pupils had successful careers at the K League even after his resignation. Especially, Ko Jong-soo and Kim Do-heon played for the national team among them.

=== Daejeon Citizen ===
On 13 July 2007, Kim signed for K League club Daejeon Citizen, cancelling his retirement. Daejeon earned 13 points in 13 league matches during the first half of the 2007 season before his appointment, whereas they qualified for the championship play-offs after getting 24 points in the other 13 matches under his guidance.

Since 2008, however, Kim was heavily involved in the club's administration, and was in conflict with their board. He directly approached the city government to receive more financial support, and the club's director regarded his method as an arrogation. He also attempted to appoint his acquaintance as the club's vice-director, and an agent who was having a close relationship with him was suspected of embezzling from the club. He brought poor results at the league during the same period, and was removed from the club along with the director in June 2019.

== Administrative career ==
On 1 November 2017, Kim came back to Daejeon Citizen as a director despite the controversies about 10 years ago. As soon as he was appointed Daejeon's director, he engaged a significant number of his acquaintances as managers, agents, and players without principle, causing controversies again. The number of Daejeon players increased to 63 at the time, and the son of reserve-team manager who was appointed by Kim was included in the squad. The highest-paid foreign players among them were also recruited by the aforementioned agent. After choosing Ko Jong-soo, who had been his pupil at Suwon Samsung Bluewings, as first-team manager, Kim interfered in the team's training. His cronyism was followed by a waste of tax money and non-payments of club staff's wages. At the end of the 2018 season, six out of 16 executives resigned together from the club, with they criticising Kim. On 11 March 2019, Daejeon announced Kim's resignation.

== Career statistics ==
=== International ===
Appearances and goals by national team and year
| National team | Year | Apps | Goals |
|---|---|---|---|
| South Korea | 1966 | 5 | 0 |
| South Korea | 1967 | 19 | 0 |
| South Korea | 1968 | 2 | 0 |
| South Korea | 1969 | 8 | 0 |
| South Korea | 1970 | 17 | 0 |
| South Korea | 1971 | 14 | 0 |
| South Korea | 1972 | 19 | 0 |
| Career total | | 84 | 0 |

Appearances and goals by competition
| Competition | Apps | Goals |
|---|---|---|
| Friendlies | 6 | 0 |
| Minor competitions | 52 | 0 |
| Asian Games | 5 | 0 |
| AFC Asian Cup qualification | 4 | 0 |
| AFC Asian Cup | 5 | 0 |
| Summer Olympics qualification | 8 | 0 |
| FIFA World Cup qualification | 4 | 0 |
| Total | 84 | 0 |

== Honours ==
=== Player ===
Cheil Industries

- Korean National Semipro League (Spring): 1964
- Korean National Semipro League (Autumn): 1968
- Korean President's Cup runner-up: 1968

Commercial Bank of Korea

- Korean President's Cup: 1970

POSCO FC

- Korean National Semipro League (Spring): 1975
- Korean President's Cup: 1974
- Korean National Championship runner-up: 1977

South Korea

- Asian Games: 1970
- AFC Asian Cup runner-up: 1972

Individual

- Korean FA Most Valuable Player: 1969
- Korean FA Best XI: 1969, 1970, 1971, 1972
- KASA Best Korean Footballer: 1971

=== Manager ===
Hanil Bank

- Korean National Semipro League: 1983
- Korean National Semipro League (Spring): 1987

Suwon Samsung Bluewings

- K League 1: 1998, 1999
- Korean FA Cup: 2002
- Korean League Cup: 1999, 1999+, 2000, 2001
- Korean Super Cup: 1999, 2000
- Asian Club Championship: 2000–01, 2001–02
- Asian Super Cup: 2001, 2002

Individual

- Korean National Semipro League (Spring) Best Manager: 1987
- AFC Coach of the Month: August 1997
- K League All-Star: 1998, 1999, 2001
- K League 1 Manager of the Year: 1998, 1999
- K League Hall of Fame: 2025
