= Kim Jung-nam =

South Korean football manager and footballer

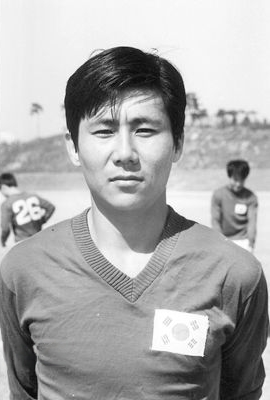
- Kim with South Korea

Personal information
- Full name: Kim Jung-nam
- Date of birth: 28 January 1943 (age 83)
- Place of birth: Keijō, Keiki-dō, Korea, Empire of Japan
- Height: 1.70 m (5 ft 7 in)
- Position: Sweeper

Youth career
- ?–1962: Hanyang Technical High School

College career
Years	Team	Apps	(Gls)
1963–1966	Korea University		

Senior career*
Years	Team	Apps	(Gls)
1966–1967	ROK Marine Corps (draft)		
1967–1970	Yangzee		
1970–1975	Korea Exchange Bank		

International career
1962	South Korea U20		
1964–1973	South Korea	67	(0)

Managerial career
- 1977: South Korea
- 1980–1982: South Korea
- 1985–1986: South Korea
- 1985–1992: Yukong Elephants
- 1988: South Korea
- 1998: Shandong Luneng
- 1999: Qingdao Yizhong Hainiu
- 2000–2008: Ulsan Hyundai
Medal record
Men's football
Representing South Korea (as player)
Asian Games
Gold medal – first place	1970 Bangkok
AFC Youth Championship
Runner-up	1962 Thailand
Representing South Korea (as manager)
Asian Games
Gold medal – first place	1986 Seoul
AFC Asian Cup
Runner-up	1980 Kuwait
- * Club domestic league appearances and goals

- Kim Jung-nam
- Hangul: 김정남
- Hanja: 金正男
- RR: Gim Jeongnam
- MR: Kim Chŏngnam

Kim Jung-nam (Korean: 김정남; Hanja: 金正男; born 28 January 1943) is a former South Korean football player and manager.

== International career ==
In 1962, Kim played for the South Korea under-20 team, and also started to be called up to the senior team from 1964. While playing 67 official matches for South Korea until 1973, he won a gold medal at the 1970 Asian Games. The combination of him and his fellow defender Kim Ho is regarded as one of the greatest South Korean centre-back duos of all time.

== Managerial career ==
After his retirement as a player in 1973, Kim started his coaching career at the national team. Between October and December 1977, he was temporarily promoted to manager during the remaining matches of the 1978 FIFA World Cup qualifiers.

On 3 May 1980, Kim became manager of South Korea for the second time. At the 1980 AFC Asian Cup, he led the team to win four consecutive matches until semi-finals including a 3–0 win over hosts Kuwait after drawing 1–1 with Malaysia in their first match. However, nine players of his team were not in normal condition after suffering injuries in the 2–1 semi-final win over North Korea, and his team lost 3–0 to Kuwait in the final due to the aftereffects.

Kim was appointed to a coach of newly-formed K League club Yukong Elephants on 17 December 1982, and was promoted to their manager on 21 July 1985. In 1989, he achieved the club's first-ever league title.

Kim managed South Korea in the 1986 FIFA World Cup qualifiers, and led his country to qualify for the World Cup for the first time in 32 years since 1954. In the Group A of the 1986 FIFA World Cup, his team lost to eventual champions Argentina and defending champions Italy with scores of 3–1 and 3–2 respectively, and drew 1–1 with Bulgaria. He redeemed his failure at the World Cup by winning the 1986 Asian Games. Lastly, he participated at the 1988 Summer Olympics before leaving the national team to concentrate on Yukong Elephants.

On 12 May 1992, Kim resigned from Yukong. On 13 January 1993, he joined Korea Football Association as the executive director. Between 1998 and 1999, he moved to China, managing two Chinese Jia-A League clubs, namely Shandong Luneng and Qingdao Yizhong Hainiu, but left them after bringing unsuccessful results.

On 22 August 2000, K League club Ulsan Hyundai announced the appointment of Kim as their new manager. During his term as Ulsan manager until 2008, he won four trophies including the club's second K League title in 2005, whereas his tactics were criticised for focusing on defense excessively. When he heard this criticism from journalists, he emphatically denied it, saying that he showed various methods of counter-attack. Until the end of his managerial career, he won a total of 210 K League matches, becoming the manager to win the most K League 1 matches. His record was broken by Choi Kang-hee in 2018.

== Personal life ==
He is the elder brother of twins Kang-nam and Sung-nam, who also became national players.

== Career statistics ==
=== International ===
Appearances and goals by national team and year
National team	Year	Apps	Goals
South Korea	1964	4	0
South Korea	1965	6	0
South Korea	1966	2	0
South Korea	1967	10	0
South Korea	1968	2	0
South Korea	1969	7	0
South Korea	1970	18	0
South Korea	1971	13	0
South Korea	1973	5	0
Career total		67	0

Appearances and goals by competition
Competition	Apps	Goals
Friendlies	6	0
Minor competitions	35	0
Asian Games	6	0
AFC Asian Cup qualification	2	0
Summer Olympics qualification	8	0
Summer Olympics	2	0
FIFA World Cup qualification	8	0
Total	67	0

== Honours ==
=== Player ===
Korea University

- Korean National Championship: 1963

Yangzee

- Korean National Championship: 1968
- Korean President's Cup: 1968
- Asian Champion Club Tournament runner-up: 1969

South Korea U20

- AFC Youth Championship runner-up: 1962

South Korea

- Asian Games: 1970

Individual

- KASA Best Korean Footballer: 1969, 1970
- Korean FA Best XI: 1969, 1970, 1971
- Korean FA Most Valuable Player: 1971

=== Manager ===
Yukong Elephants

- K League 1: 1989

Ulsan Hyundai

- K League 1: 2005
- Korean League Cup: 2007
- Korean Super Cup: 2006
- A3 Champions Cup: 2006

South Korea

- Asian Games: 1986
- AFC Asian Cup runner-up: 1980

Individual

- K League 1 Manager of the Year: 1989
- K League All-Star: 1991, 2002, 2003
- K League Hall of Fame: 2023
