= Kim Hwang-ho =

South Korean footballer

Personal information
- Full name: 15 August 1954 (age 72)
- Place of birth: South Korea
- Height: 1.75 m (5 ft 9 in)
- Position: Goalkeeper

Youth career
- Kyung Hee University

Senior career*
Years	Team	Apps	(Gls)
1977	Auto Insurance		
1978–1979	Korean Navy		
1980–1981	Auto Insurance		

International career
1976–1981	South Korea	34	(0)
- * Club domestic league appearances and goals

- Kim Hwang-ho
- Hangul: 김황호
- Hanja: 金黃鎬
- RR: Gim Hwangho
- MR: Kim Hwangho

Kim Hwang-ho (born August 15, 1954) is a Korean football goalkeeper who played for South Korea in the 1980 Asian Cup. He also played for Auto Insurance and Korean Navy.

== International record ==
Year	Apps	Goal
1976	0	0
1977	9	0
1978	17	0
1979	3	0
1980	4	0
1981	1	0
Total	34	0
