= Cha Bum-kun =

South Korean footballer

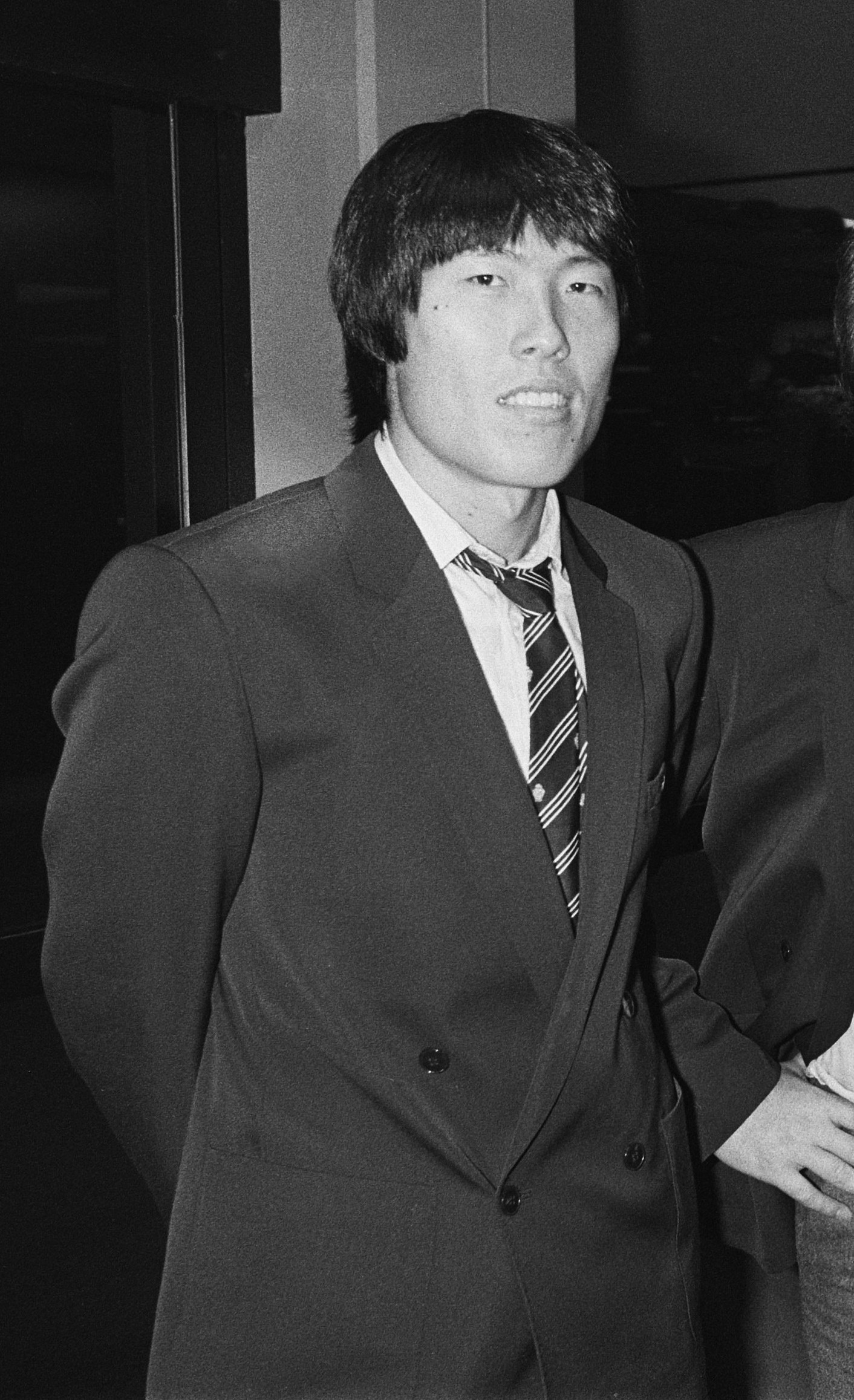
- Cha in 1979

Personal information
- Date of birth: 22 May 1953 (age 73)
- Place of birth: Hwasung, South Korea
- Height: 1.79 m (5 ft 10 in)
- Position: Forward

Youth career
- 1967–1968: Kyungshin Middle School
- 1969–1971: Kyungshin High School

College career
Years	Team	Apps	(Gls)
1972–1975	Korea University		

Senior career*
Years	Team	Apps	(Gls)
1976	Korea Trust Bank		
1976–1979	ROK Air Force (draft)		
1978–1979	Darmstadt 98	1	(0)
1979–1983	Eintracht Frankfurt	122	(46)
1983–1989	Bayer Leverkusen	185	(52)
Total		308	(98)

International career
1970–1972	South Korea U20		
1972–1986	South Korea	136	(58)

Managerial career
- 1991–1994: Hyundai Horang-i
- 1997–1998: South Korea
- 1998–1999: Shenzhen Ping'an
- 2004–2010: Suwon Samsung Bluewings
Medal record
Representing South Korea
Men's football
Asian Games
Gold medal – first place	1978 Bangkok
AFC Asian Cup
Runner-up	1972 Thailand
AFC Youth Championship
Runner-up	1971 Japan
Runner-up	1972 Thailand
- * Club domestic league appearances and goals

- Korean name
- Hangul: 차범근
- Hanja: 車範根
- RR: Cha Beomgeun
- MR: Ch'a Pŏmgŭn

Cha Bum-kun (Korean: 차범근; Korean pronunciation: [tɕʰɐbʌmɡɯn] or [tɕʰɐ] [pʌmɡɯn]; born 22 May 1953), popularly known in Germany as Tscha Bum or Cha Boom, is a South Korean former professional football manager and player. Known for his explosive pace and finishing, he is widely regarded as one of the greatest Asian footballers of all time.

Born in Hwaseong, South Korea, Cha left for West Germany following the completion of his mandatory military service and first joined SV Darmstadt 98, before signing with Eintracht Frankfurt in 1979. During his tenure at the club, Cha scored 46 goals over 122 appearances, and won the 1979–80 UEFA Cup, his first European title. After leaving Frankfurt in 1983, Cha joined fellow Bundesliga club Bayer Leverkusen, winning the UEFA Cup yet again in 1988. Cha retired in 1989, having scored 98 goals in 308 appearances during his time at Germany.

Cha made his international debut with South Korea national football team in 1972 at the age of 18. He is the youngest player to ever reach 100 international caps, doing so at 24 years and 35 days, (Note: In 2013, when Cha's 121 international caps was being recognised, FIFA introduced him as the youngest player to accumulate 100 caps at 24 years and 139 days (vs. Kuwait, 9 October 1977). Afterwards, his record was shortened to 24 years and 35 days (vs. Hong Kong, 26 June 1977) according to the list of his 136 caps updated recently, and can be seen as 24 years and 65 days (vs. Malaysia, 26 July 1977) when excluding six Olympic qualifiers by the rule of FIFA.) and was South Korea's all-time top goalscorer with 58 goals until Son Heung-min surpassed him in 2026.

After his retirement, he opened a football academy to develop youth players in South Korea, and managed the national team for the 1998 FIFA World Cup.

== Early life ==
Cha was born in Hwaseong, Gyeonggi. He originally joined Yeongdo Middle School to learn football, but the school's football club was dissolved as soon as he joined there. He started his football career by transferring to Kyungshin Middle School after playing field hockey for Yeongdo for one and a half years. In his high school days, he tried to leave school due to violence from older students, but continued to play football with the manager Chang Woon-soo's help. He became a notable player of Kyungshin High School, and was selected for the South Korean under-20 team in 1970.

== Club career ==
=== Career in South Korea ===
Cha entered Korea University in 1972, and won the Korean National Championship in 1974, the predecessor of the Korean FA Cup. After his graduation, he started his senior career with Korea Trust Bank FC in 1976. He led his team to the title and was named the best player in the spring season of the Korean National Semipro League. In October 1976, he joined Air Force FC to serve his mandatory military service. Cha originally planned to enlist in the Navy, but the Republic of Korea Air Force persuaded him that it would move his discharge up by six months.

=== Darmstadt 98 ===
While playing for the national team in the 1978 Korea Cup, Cha attracted the attention of Eintracht Frankfurt coach Dieter Schulte, who was serving as an scout/observer at the tournament. In November 1978, Schulte sent a letter to the KFA (Korea Football Association), suggesting Cha to tryout in West Germany after being discharged from the Air Force in January 1979. Cha had taken time off to leave for Frankfurt after the 1978 Asian Games in December and began playing for another Bundesliga club, Darmstadt 98, by signing a six-month deal. However, he spent just less than a month in Darmstadt. The ROK Air Force didn't follow their original promise to Cha, and ordered his return. After his debut match against VfL Bochum on 30 December, Cha returned to South Korea. He eventually spent the remainder of the duration of his military service until 31 May, and so could not play for Darmstadt.

=== Eintracht Frankfurt ===
After being discharged from military service completely, Cha still wanted to play in the Bundesliga, and joined Eintracht Frankfurt at age 26 in July 1979. In his first season, Cha scored in three consecutive games, making an immediate impact in his new club. After the first half of his first season in Germany, he was classified as "world class" by the German football magazine kicker in their biannual ranking of players. He was also acclaimed by showing great performances during Eintracht's run to win its first-ever UEFA Cup title. He was evaluated as the "unstoppable player" by Sir Alex Ferguson (who was managing Aberdeen at the time), and "one of the best attackers in the world" by Lothar Matthäus (an opponent player in the UEFA Cup final and the Bundesliga, for Borussia Mönchengladbach). In addition to a UEFA Cup title, he was named along with Karl-Heinz Rummenigge and Kevin Keegan in the Bundesliga Team of the Season by kicker. On 23 August 1980, Cha suffered spinal injury during a match against Bayer Leverkusen, but came back to the stadium after a month. Afterwards, he scored six goals in six matches in the 1980–81 DFB-Pokal, leading Eintracht to the title. He became Eintracht's top goalscorer for three consecutive seasons.

=== Bayer Leverkusen ===
After Frankfurt faced mounting financial difficulties, Cha transferred to Bayer Leverkusen in 1983. In the 1985–86 Bundesliga, he scored his most goals in a single Bundesliga season with 17 goals, and Leverkusen qualified for the UEFA Cup for the first time as the sixth-placed team. The magazine kicker once again selected him for the Team of the Season, and the Abendpost-Nachtausgabe gave him the Player of the Season award. In the 1988 UEFA Cup final, he scored a dramatic equaliser against Espanyol to tie the game 3–3. Leverkusen eventually went on to win the game on penalties, capturing its first European title and the second for Cha.

Cha retired in 1989 after playing 308 Bundesliga games. During his Bundesliga career, he scored 98 goals without a penalty, and received only one yellow card. On 31 October 1987, he scored his 93rd Bundesliga goal, becoming the top foreign goalscorer by surpassing Willi Lippens. His scoring record wasn't broken for eleven years until Stéphane Chapuisat of Switzerland surpassed him. As of 2024, Cha is ranked ninth along with Pierre-Emerick Aubameyang in the Bundesliga's foreign goalscorer standings.

== International career ==
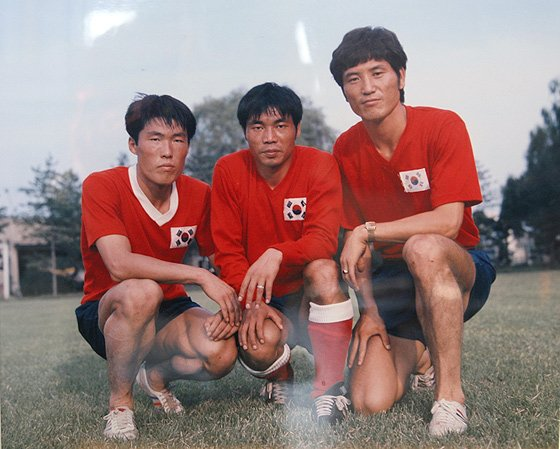
Cha with Park Lee-chun and Kim Jae-han playing for South Korea in the early 1970s.

Cha generally played as a striker in the Bundesliga, but he had originally been a winger in South Korea. He became a South Korean under-20 international in 1970, and took part in the AFC Youth Championship in 1971 and 1972. In the 1972 AFC Asian Cup, he made his senior international debut against Iraq, and scored his first international goal against Khmer Republic. He was named in the Korean FA Best XI for seven consecutive years, and was selected as the Korean FA Player of the Year in 1973.

Cha usually played for the national team in the Korea Cup, Merdeka Tournament and King's Cup (Thailand), which were annually contested between Asian nations and the invited clubs at the time. He won a total of ten trophies and also left memorable games in three competitions. In the 1975 Merdeka Tournament, he scored his first international hat-trick against Japan. In the 1976 Korea Cup, he scored a hat-trick against Malaysia in five minutes, leading South Korea to a dramatic 4–4 draw.

During qualification for the 1978 FIFA World Cup, he played all of South Korea's twelve matches, and recorded five goals and two assists, although his knee got a boil during the competition. However, South Korea failed to qualify for the World Cup by finishing the qualification as runners-up despite his struggle.

In the 1978 Asian Games, he scored two goals and provided two assists, contributing to team's gold medal. However, he showed lethargic plays to prepare tryouts for Bundesliga clubs, and received criticisms. After the 1978 Asian Games, he left for the Bundesliga and didn't play for South Korea. His last international tournament was the 1986 FIFA World Cup, South Korea's first World Cup since 1954. He showed exemplary performance in intensive checks by opponents, but failed to prevent South Korea's elimination in the group stage.

== Managerial career ==
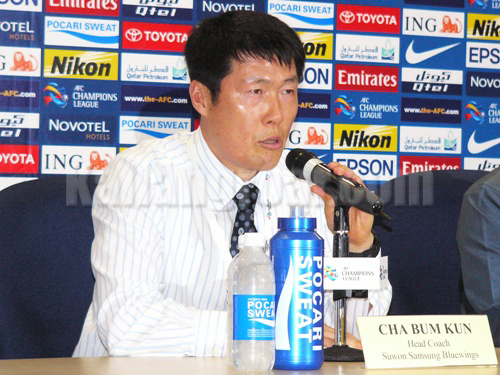
Cha Bum-kun as manager of Suwon Samsung Bluewings in 2009.

Cha moved into management with K League side Hyundai Horang-i, coaching them from 1991–94. His next appointment in January 1997 was Korean national team coach and he led the nation to the 1998 FIFA World Cup; however, a disastrous 5–0 defeat at the hands of the Netherlands in Korea's second group game got Cha fired. He later blamed the KFA for the bad performance, citing lack of bonuses and alleging pro soccer games in Korea were fixed. The association promptly slapped a five-year ban on him and he soon left the country with his wife.

After an 18-month spell coaching Shenzhen Ping'an in China, Cha took up a commentator position with MBC in Korea. He returned to coaching in late 2003 when offered the Suwon Samsung Bluewings position. Cha achieved immediate success with Suwon by lifting the 2004 K League championship, an achievement he ranked as even better than the UEFA Cup he won as a player in 1988. He later resigned in June 2010 as Suwon manager.

== Personal life ==
Cha in 1986

Cha is a Christian.

Cha's second child, Cha Du-ri, also played for the South Korean national team and Bundesliga clubs, among them Eintracht, following in his father's footsteps.

In November 2019, Cha received the Cross of Merit from the German government.

== Career statistics ==
=== Club ===
Appearances and goals by club, season and competition
Club	Season	League			Cup		Continental		Total	
Club	Season	Division	Apps	Goals	Apps	Goals	Apps	Goals	Apps	Goals
Korea Trust Bank	1976	National Semipro League	?	?	? (Note: Appearance(s) in Korean National Championship, Korean President's Cup)	?	—		?	?
ROK Air Force (draft)	1976	National Semipro League	?	?	?	?	—		?	?
ROK Air Force (draft)	1977	National Semipro League	?	?	?	?	—		?	?
ROK Air Force (draft)	1978	National Semipro League	?	?	?	?	—		?	?
ROK Air Force (draft)	1979	National Semipro League	?	?	?	?	—		?	?
ROK Air Force (draft)	Total		?	?	?	?	—		?	?
Darmstadt 98	1978–79	Bundesliga	1	0	—		—		1	0
Eintracht Frankfurt	1979–80	Bundesliga	31	12	4	0	11 (Note: Appearance(s) in UEFA Cup)	3	46	15
Eintracht Frankfurt	1980–81	Bundesliga	27	8	6	6	5	2	38	16
Eintracht Frankfurt	1981–82	Bundesliga	31	11	1	0	6 (Note: Appearance(s) in UEFA Cup Winners' Cup)	1	38	12
Eintracht Frankfurt	1982–83	Bundesliga	33	15	1	0	—		34	15
Eintracht Frankfurt	Total		122	46	12	6	22	6	156	58
Bayer Leverkusen	1983–84	Bundesliga	34	12	1	0	—		35	12
Bayer Leverkusen	1984–85	Bundesliga	29	10	3	4	—		32	14
Bayer Leverkusen	1985–86	Bundesliga	34	17	4	2	—		38	19
Bayer Leverkusen	1986–87	Bundesliga	33	6	2	1	3	2	38	9
Bayer Leverkusen	1987–88	Bundesliga	25	4	0	0	10	2	35	6
Bayer Leverkusen	1988–89	Bundesliga	30	3	5	0	2	0	37	3
Bayer Leverkusen	Total		185	52	15	7	15	4	215	63
Career total			308	98	27	13	37	10	372	121

=== International ===
As of 8 July 2020

The KFA is showing the list of Cha's 136 international appearances in its official website. The RSSSF is also claiming 136 appearances about Cha's international career, but its details have some discrepancies. FIFA registered him with 130 appearances in the FIFA Century Club by excluding six matches in the Summer Olympics qualification.

Appearances and goals by national team and year
National team	Year	Apps	Goals
South Korea	1972	23	6
South Korea	1973	17	8
South Korea	1974	13	2
South Korea	1975	19 (Note: Includes one appearance in Summer Olympics qualification)	9
South Korea	1976	19 (Note: Includes five appearances and two goals in Summer Olympics qualification)	13
South Korea	1977	26	15
South Korea	1978	16	5
South Korea	1986	3	0
Career total		136	58

Appearances and goals by competition
Competition	Apps	Goals
Friendlies	10	2
Minor competitions	76	44
Asian Games	12	2
AFC Asian Cup qualification	4	0
AFC Asian Cup	5	1
Summer Olympics qualification	6	2
FIFA World Cup qualification	20	7
FIFA World Cup	3	0
Total	136	58

Scores list South Korea's goal tally first.

List of international goals scored by Cha Bum-kun
No.	Date	Venue	Cap	Opponent	Score	Result	Competition
1	10 May 1972	National Stadium, Bangkok, Thailand	2	Khmer Republic	3–0	4–1	1972 AFC Asian Cup
2	19 July 1972	Perak Stadium, Ipoh, Malaysia	8	Singapore	2–0	4–1	1972 Merdeka Tournament
3	23 July 1972	Stadium Merdeka, Kuala Lumpur, Malaysia	9	Indonesia	2–0	2–0	1972 Merdeka Tournament
4	29 July 1972	Stadium Merdeka, Kuala Lumpur, Malaysia	11	Malaysia	2–0	2–1	1972 Merdeka Tournament
5	20 September 1972	Dongdaemun Stadium, Seoul, South Korea	13	Thailand	3–0	3–0	1972 Korea Cup
6	22 November 1972	National Stadium, Bangkok, Thailand	21	Indonesia	1–1	1–1	1972 King's Cup
7	19 May 1973	Dongdaemun Stadium, Seoul, South Korea	24	Thailand	2–0	4–0	1974 FIFA World Cup qualification
8	28 May 1973	Dongdaemun Stadium, Seoul, South Korea	28	Israel	1–0	1–0	1974 FIFA World Cup qualification
9	22 September 1973	Dongdaemun Stadium, Seoul, South Korea	30	Khmer Republic	2–0	6–0	1973 Korea Cup
10	22 September 1973	Dongdaemun Stadium, Seoul, South Korea	30	Khmer Republic	4–0	6–0	1973 Korea Cup
11	30 September 1973	Dongdaemun Stadium, Seoul, South Korea	33	Malaysia	1–0	2–0	1973 Korea Cup
12	16 December 1973	National Stadium, Bangkok, Thailand	37	Khmer Republic	4–0	5–0	1973 King's Cup
13	22 December 1973	National Stadium, Bangkok, Thailand	39	Burma	2–0	2–0	1973 King's Cup
14	25 December 1973	National Stadium, Bangkok, Thailand	40	Malaysia	2–0	2–1	1973 King's Cup
15	18 May 1974	Dongdaemun Stadium, Seoul, South Korea	43	Burma	2–0	3–0	1974 Korea Cup
16	25 December 1974	Hong Kong	54	Indonesia	2–0	3–1	Hong Kong Tournament
17	29 July 1975	Stadium Merdeka, Kuala Lumpur, Malaysia	58	Malaysia	2–0	3–1	1975 Merdeka Tournament
18	7 August 1975	Stadium Merdeka, Kuala Lumpur, Malaysia	61	Thailand	3–0	6–0	1975 Merdeka Tournament
19	9 August 1975	Stadium Merdeka, Kuala Lumpur, Malaysia	62	Japan	1–0	3–1	1975 Merdeka Tournament
20	9 August 1975	Stadium Merdeka, Kuala Lumpur, Malaysia	62	Japan	2–1	3–1	1975 Merdeka Tournament
21	9 August 1975	Stadium Merdeka, Kuala Lumpur, Malaysia	62	Japan	3–1	3–1	1975 Merdeka Tournament
22	11 August 1975	Stadium Merdeka, Kuala Lumpur, Malaysia	63	Indonesia	1–0	5–1	1975 Merdeka Tournament
23	15 August 1975	Stadium Merdeka, Kuala Lumpur, Malaysia	64	Bangladesh	4–0	4–0	1975 Merdeka Tournament
24	21 December 1975	National Stadium, Bangkok, Thailand	68	Burma	1–0	3–1	1975 King's Cup
25	21 December 1975	National Stadium, Bangkok, Thailand	68	Burma	2–0	3–1	1975 King's Cup
26	6 March 1976	Dongdaemun Stadium, Seoul, South Korea	73	Taiwan	1–0	3–0	1976 Summer Olympics qualification
27	27 March 1976	Dongdaemun Stadium, Seoul, South Korea	75	Japan	2–1	2–2	1976 Summer Olympics qualification
28	10 August 1976	Stadium Merdeka, Kuala Lumpur, Malaysia	79	India	1–0	8–0	1976 Merdeka Tournament
29	10 August 1976	Stadium Merdeka, Kuala Lumpur, Malaysia	79	India	5–0	8–0	1976 Merdeka Tournament
30	10 August 1976	Stadium Merdeka, Kuala Lumpur, Malaysia	79	India	8–0	8–0	1976 Merdeka Tournament
31	15 August 1976	Stadium Merdeka, Kuala Lumpur, Malaysia	81	Burma	2–2	2–2	1976 Merdeka Tournament
32	11 September 1976	Dongdaemun Stadium, Seoul, South Korea	84	Malaysia	2–4	4–4	1976 Korea Cup
33	11 September 1976	Dongdaemun Stadium, Seoul, South Korea	84	Malaysia	3–4	4–4	1976 Korea Cup
34	11 September 1976	Dongdaemun Stadium, Seoul, South Korea	84	Malaysia	4–4	4–4	1976 Korea Cup
35	13 September 1976	Dongdaemun Stadium, Seoul, South Korea	85	India	4–0	4–0	1976 Korea Cup
36	17 September 1976	Dongdaemun Stadium, Seoul, South Korea	86	Singapore	1–0	7–0	1976 Korea Cup
37	17 September 1976	Dongdaemun Stadium, Seoul, South Korea	86	Singapore	7–0	7–0	1976 Korea Cup
38	22 December 1976	National Stadium, Bangkok, Thailand	91	Malaysia	1–1	1–1	1976 King's Cup
39	14 February 1977	Singapore	92	Singapore	1–0	4–0	Friendly
40	18 February 1977	Al Ahli Stadium, Manama, Bahrain	93	Bahrain	2–0	4–1	Friendly
41	20 March 1977	Dongdaemun Stadium, Seoul, South Korea	96	Israel	1–0	3–1	1978 FIFA World Cup qualification
42	3 April 1977	Dongdaemun Stadium, Seoul, South Korea	98	Japan	1–0	1–0	1978 FIFA World Cup qualification
43	26 June 1977	Hong Kong Stadium, Hong Kong	100	Hong Kong	1–0	1–0	1978 FIFA World Cup qualification
44	17 July 1977	Stadium Merdeka, Kuala Lumpur, Malaysia	102	Libya	2–0	4–0	1977 Merdeka Tournament
45	22 July 1977	Stadium Merdeka, Kuala Lumpur, Malaysia	104	Indonesia	3–1	5–1	1977 Merdeka Tournament
46	24 July 1977	Stadium Merdeka, Kuala Lumpur, Malaysia	105	Burma	2–0	4–0	1977 Merdeka Tournament
47	31 July 1977	Stadium Merdeka, Kuala Lumpur, Malaysia	108	Iraq	1–0	1–0	1977 Merdeka Tournament
48	27 August 1977	Sydney Sports Ground, Sydney, Australia	109	Australia	1–0	1–2	1978 FIFA World Cup qualification
49	3 September 1977	Dongdaemun Stadium, Seoul, South Korea	110	Thailand	3–0	5–1	1977 Korea Cup
50	5 September 1977	Daegu Civic Stadium, Daegu, South Korea	111	India	1–0	3–0	1977 Korea Cup
51	5 September 1977	Daegu Civic Stadium, Daegu, South Korea	111	India	3–0	3–0	1977 Korea Cup
52	13 September 1977	Dongdaemun Stadium, Seoul, South Korea	112	Malaysia	2–0	3–0	1977 Korea Cup
53	5 November 1977	Al Kuwait Sports Club Stadium, Kuwait City, Kuwait	115	Kuwait	1–0	2–2	1978 FIFA World Cup qualification
54	19 July 1978	Stadium Merdeka, Kuala Lumpur, Malaysia	121	Japan	2–0	4–0	1978 Merdeka Tournament
55	22 July 1978	Stadium Merdeka, Kuala Lumpur, Malaysia	122	Iraq	2–0	2–0	1978 Merdeka Tournament
56	25 July 1978	Stadium Merdeka, Kuala Lumpur, Malaysia	123	Indonesia	1–0	2–0	1978 Merdeka Tournament
57	11 December 1978	Chulalongkorn University Stadium, Bangkok, Thailand	127	Bahrain	3–0	5–1	1978 Asian Games
58	17 December 1978	Bangkok, Thailand	130	China	1–0	1–0	1978 Asian Games

== Honours ==
=== Player ===
Korea University

- Korean National Championship: 1974

Korea Trust Bank

- Korean National Semipro League (Spring): 1976

ROK Air Force

- Korean National Championship runner-up: 1976

Eintracht Frankfurt

- UEFA Cup: 1979–80
- DFB-Pokal: 1980–81

Bayer Leverkusen

- UEFA Cup: 1987–88

South Korea U20

- AFC Youth Championship runner-up: 1971, 1972

South Korea

- Asian Games: 1978
- AFC Asian Cup runner-up: 1972

Individual

- IFFHS World's Player of the 20th Century 60th place: 2000
- IFFHS Legends: 2016
- IFFHS Asia's Player of the 20th Century: 1999
- IFFHS Asian Men's Team of the 20th Century: 2021
- IFFHS Asian Men's Team of All Time: 2021
- MasterCard Asian/Oceanian Team of the 20th Century: 1998
- ESPN Best Asian Footballer of All Time: 2015
- Korean FA Best XI: 1972, 1973, 1974, 1975, 1976, 1977, 1978
- Korean FA Most Valuable Player: 1973
- Korean FA Hall of Fame: 2005
- Korean National Semipro League (Spring) Best Player: 1976
- Korean Sports Hall of Fame: 2017
- kicker Team of the Season: 1979–80, 1985–86
- Eintracht Frankfurt All-time XI: 2013

Records

- Youngest player in the world to reach 100 international caps: 24 years, 35 days

=== Manager ===
Hyundai Horang-i

- Korean League Cup runner-up: 1993

Suwon Samsung Bluewings

- Pan-Pacific Championship: 2009
- A3 Champions Cup: 2005
- K League 1: 2004, 2008
- Korean FA Cup: 2009
- Korean League Cup: 2005, 2008
- Korean Super Cup: 2005

Individual

- K League All-Star: 1992, 2005, 2006, 2007, 2008, 2009
- AFC Coach of the Month: February 1997, May 1997, September 1997
- AFC Coach of the Year: 1997
- K League 1 Manager of the Year: 2004, 2008
- Korean FA Cup Best Manager: 2009

== See also ==
- List of men's footballers with 100 or more international caps
- List of men's footballers with 50 or more international goals
