= Lee Se-yeon =

South Korean footballer

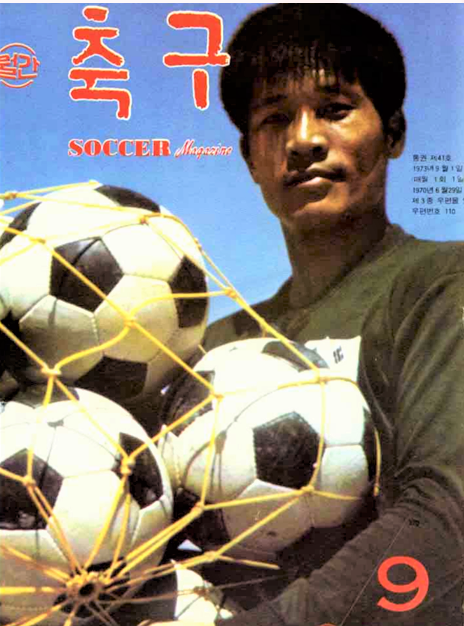
- Lee in 1973

Personal information
- Full name: Lee Se-yeon
- Date of birth: 11 July 1945 (age 81)
- Place of birth: Unnyul, Kōkai-dō, Korea, Empire of Japan
- Height: 1.75 m (5 ft 9 in)
- Position: Goalkeeper

Youth career
- 1961: Kangmoon Middle School
- 1962–1964: Hanyang Technical High School

College career
Years	Team	Apps	(Gls)
1965–1967	Kyung Hee University		

Senior career*
Years	Team	Apps	(Gls)
1967–1970	Yangzee		
1970–1975	Korea Trust Bank		

International career
1964–1965	South Korea U20		
1966–1973	South Korea	81	(0)
Medal record
Representing South Korea
Men's football
Asian Games
Gold medal – first place	1970 Bangkok
AFC Asian Cup
Runner-up	1972 Thailand
- * Club domestic league appearances and goals

- Lee Se-yeon
- Hangul: 이세연
- Hanja: 李世淵
- RR: I Seyeon
- MR: I Seyŏn

Lee Se-yeon (Korean: 이세연; born 11 July 1945) is a former South Korean footballer.

== International career ==
Lee Se-yeon is regarded as one of the greatest South Korean goalkeepers of the 20th century. He conceded 55 goals in 81 caps, and won nine Asian titles including the 1970 Asian Games with South Korea national team.

South Korea had fierce atmosphere when playing with Japan at the time, because it hadn't been long since Korea had gained independence from Japan. Lee also had a strong sense of the rivalry against Japan. A clash between Lee and Kunishige Kamamoto attracted attention for a while in South Korea. South Korea recorded five wins, three draws and one loss in nine games against Japan while he played for the national team.

== Style of play ==
Lee was strong on aerial duels by learning artistic gymnastics, although he had short height.

== Career statistics ==
=== International ===
Appearances and goals by national team and year
National team	Year	Apps	Goals
South Korea	1966	1	0
South Korea	1967	7	0
South Korea	1968	6	0
South Korea	1969	6	0
South Korea	1970	17	0
South Korea	1971	15	0
South Korea	1972	18	0
South Korea	1973	11	0
Career total		81	0

Appearances and goals by competition
Competition	Apps	Goals
Friendlies	8	0
Minor competitions	45	0
Asian Games	7	0
AFC Asian Cup qualification	2	0
AFC Asian Cup	5	0
Summer Olympics qualification	5	0
FIFA World Cup qualification	9	0
Total	81	0

== Honours ==
Yangzee

- Korean National Championship: 1968
- Korean President's Cup: 1968
- Asian Champion Club Tournament runner-up: 1969

Korea Trust Bank

- Korean National Semipro League (Spring): 1971
- Korean National Semipro League (Autumn): 1973
- Korean National Championship runner-up: 1971

South Korea

- Asian Games: 1970
- AFC Asian Cup runner-up: 1972

Individual

- Korean FA Best XI: 1969, 1970, 1971, 1972
