= Lee Cha-man =

South Korean footballer and manager (born 1950)

Lee Cha-man 이차만
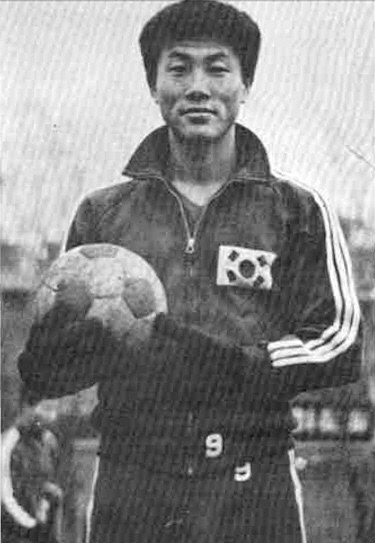
- Lee in 1971

Personal information
- Date of birth: 30 September 1950 (age 76)
- Place of birth: Gimhae, South Korea
- Position: Midfielder

Team information
- Current team: Gyeongnam FC

Youth career
- 1967–1970: Bukyung High School
- 1970–1973: Korea University

Senior career*
Years	Team	Apps	(Gls)
1974–1975	POSCO		
1976–1978	ROK Army		
1978–1980	POSCO		

International career
1969	South Korea U-20		
1972–1979	South Korea		

Managerial career
- 1980–1983: Korea University (Coach)
- 1983–1986: Daewoo Royals (Coach)
- 1987–1989: Daewoo Royals
- 1988–1990: South Korea (Coach)
- 1990: South Korea
- 1992: Daewoo Royals
- 1996–1999: Busan Daewoo Royals
- 2004–2008: Bukyung High School
- 2014: Gyeongnam FC
- * Club domestic league appearances and goals

- Lee Cha-man
- Hangul: 이차만
- Hanja: 李次滿
- RR: I Chaman
- MR: I Ch'aman

Lee Cha-man (born 30 September 1950, Gimhae) is a former South Korean footballer and football manager who managed for Busan Daewoo Royals and South Korea national team.

He was the member of South Korea U-20 team of 1969 AFC Youth Championship. He also played for South Korea of 1972 AFC Asian Cup as midfielder.

== Honours ==
=== as Player ===
South Korea

- AFC Asian Cup Runners-up (1) : 1972
- Merdeka Tournament Winners (1) : 1975

POSCO

- Korea Football League Champions (1) : 1975 Spring

=== as Manager ===
South Korea

- Dynasty Cup Winners (1) : 1990

Busan Daewoo Royals

- K League Champions (2) : 1987, 1997
- Afro-Asian Club Championship Winners (1): 1986
- League Cup Winners (1) : 1997
- League Cup (Supplementary Cup)
  - Winners (1) : 1998
  - Runners-up (1) : 1999
- Korean National Football Championship
  - Winners (1) : 1989
  - Runners-up (1) : 1988
