= List of Busan IPark seasons =

This is a list of seasons played by Busan I Park Football Club in South Korean and Asian football, from 1983 to the most recent completed season. It details the club's achievements in major competitions, and the top scorers for each season. Top scorers in bold were also the top scorers in the South Korean league that season.

The club has won the K-League 4 times, the KFA Cup 1 time, the K-League Cup 3 times and the AFC Champions League once.

== Seasons ==
| Season | League | | | | | | | | | Play-off | KFA Cup | League Cup | Asia / Other | Top scorer | |
| Season | Division | P | W | D | L | F | A | Pts | Pos | Play-off | KFA Cup | League Cup | Asia / Other | Player | Goals |
|---|---|---|---|---|---|---|---|---|---|---|---|---|---|---|---|
| 1983 | KSL | 16 | 6 | 7 | 3 | 21 | 14 | 19 | 2nd | n/a | | | | Lee Chun-Seok | 8 |
| 1984 | KSL 1S | 14 | 9 | 2 | 3 | 24 | 15 | 30 | 2nd | **1st** | | | | Lee Tae-Ho | 11 |
| 1984 | KSL 2S | 14 | 8 | 4 | 2 | 23 | 8 | 29 | **1st** | **1st** | | | | Lee Tae-Ho | 11 |
| 1985 | KSL | 21 | 9 | 7 | 5 | 22 | 16 | 25 | 3rd | n/a | | | | Chung Hae-Won | 9 |
| 1986 | KSL 1S | 10 | 4 | 2 | 4 | 8 | 10 | 10 | 4th | DNQ | | RU | **ACC – W** | **Chung Hae-Won** | **13** |
| 1986 | KSL 2S | 10 | 6 | 0 | 4 | 18 | 14 | 12 | 3rd | DNQ | | RU | **Af-AsCC – W** | **Chung Hae-Won** | **13** |
| 1987 | KPFL | 32 | 16 | 14 | 2 | 41 | 20 | 46 | **1st** | n/a | | n/a | | Kim Joo-Sung | 10 |
| 1988 | KPFL | 24 | 8 | 5 | 11 | 28 | 30 | 21 | 5th | n/a | | n/a | | Lee Tae-Ho; Choi Tae-Jin | 5 |
| 1989 | KPFL | 40 | 14 | 14 | 12 | 44 | 44 | 42 | 3rd | n/a | | n/a | | Lee Tae-Ho | 8 |
| 1990 | KPFL | 30 | 12 | 11 | 7 | 30 | 25 | 35 | 2nd | n/a | | n/a | ACWC – R2 | Lee Tae-Ho | 6 |
| 1991 | KPFL | 40 | 17 | 18 | 5 | 49 | 32 | 52 | **1st** | n/a | | n/a | | Kim Joo-Sung | 14 |
| 1992 | KPFL | 30 | 7 | 14 | 9 | 26 | 33 | 28 | 5th | n/a | | 6th | | Lee Tae-Ho | 6 |
| 1993 | KPFL | 30 | 5 | 15 | 10 | 22 | 32 | 40 | 6th | n/a | | 3rd | | Lee Ki-Keun | 7 |
| 1994 | KPFL | 30 | 7 | 6 | 17 | 37 | 56 | 27 | 6th | n/a | | 3rd | | Kim Kwi-Hwa; No Kyung-Hwan | 9 |
| 1995 | KPFL 1S | 14 | 5 | 3 | 6 | 16 | 19 | 18 | 4th | DNQ | | 3rd | | Saša Drakulić | 8 |
| 1995 | KPFL 2S | 14 | 4 | 2 | 8 | 14 | 21 | 14 | 8th | DNQ | | 3rd | | Saša Drakulić | 8 |
| 1996 | KPFL 1S | 16 | 4 | 3 | 9 | 23 | 28 | 15 | 7th | DNQ | QF | 3rd | | Ha Seok-Ju | 11 |
| 1996 | KPFL 2S | 16 | 5 | 6 | 5 | 22 | 23 | 21 | 4th | DNQ | QF | 3rd | | Ha Seok-Ju | 11 |
| 1997 | KPFL | 18 | 11 | 4 | 3 | 24 | 9 | 37 | **1st** | n/a | R1 | **LC – W** | | Radivoje Manić | 14 |
| 1997 | KPFL | 18 | 11 | 4 | 3 | 24 | 9 | 37 | **1st** | n/a | R1 | **SC – W** | | Radivoje Manić | 14 |
| 1998 | K-League | 18 | 10 | 0 | 8 | 27 | 22 | 25 | 5th | DNQ | QF | LC – 5th(GS) | | Ahn Jung-Hwan | 13 |
| 1998 | K-League | 18 | 10 | 0 | 8 | 27 | 22 | 25 | 5th | DNQ | QF | **SC – W** | | Ahn Jung-Hwan | 13 |
| 1999 | K-League | 18 | 14 | 0 | 13 | 37 | 36 | 37 | 4th | 2nd | R2 | LC – R1 | ACC – QF | Ahn Jung-Hwan | 22 |
| 1999 | K-League | 18 | 14 | 0 | 13 | 37 | 36 | 37 | 4th | 2nd | R2 | SC – RU | ACC – QF | Ahn Jung-Hwan | 22 |
| 2000 | K-League | 27 | 11 | 0 | 16 | 42 | 42 | 29 | 6th | DNQ | SF | LC – QF | | Ahn Jung-Hwan | 10 |
| 2000 | K-League | 27 | 11 | 0 | 16 | 42 | 42 | 29 | 6th | DNQ | SF | SC – 4th(GS) | | Ahn Jung-Hwan | 10 |
| 2001 | K-League | 27 | 10 | 11 | 6 | 38 | 33 | 41 | 4th | n/a | QF | RU | | Woo Sung-Yong | 16 |
| 2002 | K-League | 27 | 6 | 8 | 13 | 36 | 45 | 26 | 9th | n/a | QF | 5th(GS) | | Woo Sung-Yong | 15 |
| 2003 | K-League | 44 | 13 | 10 | 21 | 41 | 71 | 49 | 9th | n/a | R1 | n/a | | Andy Cooke | 14 |
| 2004 | K-League 1S | 12 | 2 | 8 | 2 | 7 | 8 | 14 | 9th | DNQ | **W** | 13th | | Ahn Hyo-Yeon | 10 |
| 2004 | K-League 2S | 12 | 4 | 4 | 4 | 14 | 11 | 16 | 6th | DNQ | **W** | 13th | | Ahn Hyo-Yeon | 10 |
| 2005 | K-League 1S | 12 | 7 | 4 | 1 | 17 | 10 | 25 | **1st** | SF | R1 | 13th | ACL – SF | Luciano Valente | 13 |
| 2005 | K-League 2S | 12 | 0 | 3 | 9 | 11 | 21 | 3 | 13th | SF | R1 | 13th | ACL – SF | Luciano Valente | 13 |
| 2006 | K-League 1S | 13 | 4 | 4 | 5 | 24 | 25 | 16 | 6th | DNQ | R2 | 10th | | Popó | 21 |
| 2006 | K-League 2S | 13 | 5 | 3 | 5 | 16 | 17 | 18 | 8th | DNQ | R2 | 10th | | Popó | 21 |
| 2007 | K-League | 26 | 4 | 8 | 14 | 20 | 39 | 20 | 13th | DNQ | QF | 4th(GS) | | Luciano Valente | 6 |
| 2008 | K-League | 26 | 5 | 7 | 14 | 30 | 39 | 22 | 12th | DNQ | R2 | QF | | Jeong Shung-Hoon | 9 |
| 2009 | K-League | 28 | 7 | 8 | 13 | 36 | 42 | 29 | 12th | DNQ | R2 | RU | | Park Hee-Do; Yang Dong-Hyun | 9 |
| 2010 | K-League | 28 | 8 | 9 | 11 | 36 | 37 | 33 | 8th | DNQ | RU | QF | | Jeong Shung-Hoon; Han Sang-Woon | 11 |

== Key ==
- P = Played
- W = Games won
- D = Games drawn
- L = Games lost
- F = Goals for
- A = Goals against
- Pts = Points
- Pos = Final position
- KSL = Korean Super League
- KPFL = Korea Professional Football League
- LC = League Cup
- SC = League Cup (Supplementary)
- Af-AsCC = Afro-Asian Club Championship
- ACWC = Asian Cup Winners' Cup
- ACC = Asian Club Championship
- ACL = AFC Champions League
- 1S = First Stage
- 2S = Second Stage
- n/a = Not applicable
- DNQ = Did not qualify
- R1 = Round 1
- R2 = Round 2
- GS = Group Stage
- QF = Quarter-finals
- SF = Semi-finals
- RU = Runners-up
- W = Winners

| Champions | Runners-up | Promoted | Relegated |
