= Jung Jo-gook =

South Korean footballer (born 1984)

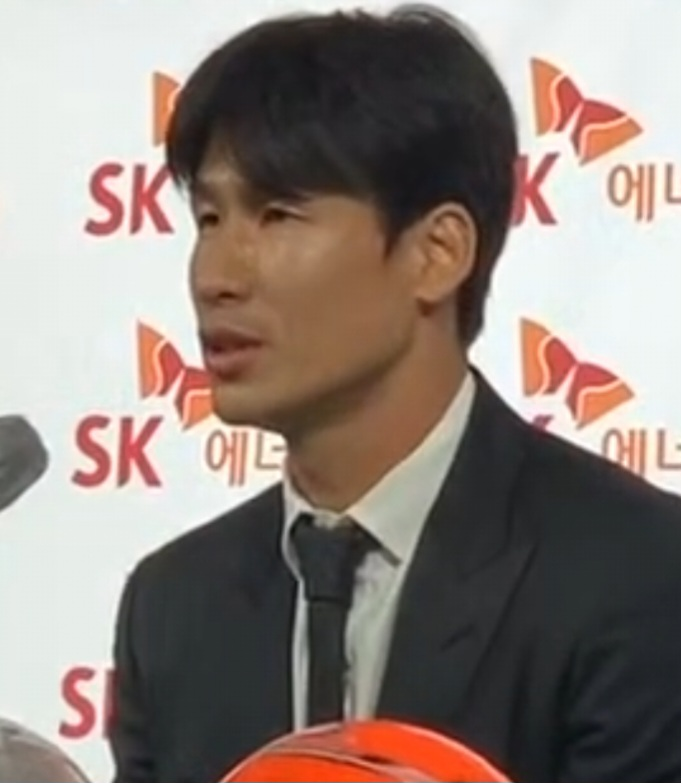
- Jung in 2020

Personal information
- Full name: Jung Jo-gook
- Date of birth: 23 April 1984 (age 42)
- Place of birth: Buan, Jeonbuk, South Korea
- Height: 1.85 m (6 ft 1 in)
- Position: Striker

Team information
- Current team: Jeju SK (assistant coach)

Senior career*
Years	Team	Apps	(Gls)
2003–2010	FC Seoul	150	(46)
2010–2012	Auxerre	16	(2)
2011	Auxerre B	3	(0)
2011–2012	→ Nancy (loan)	20	(2)
2012–2015	FC Seoul	30	(5)
2013–2014	→ Ansan Police (draft)	36	(16)
2016	Gwangju FC	31	(20)
2017–2019	Gangwon FC	74	(16)
2020	Jeju United	12	(1)
Total		372	(108)

International career
2000	South Korea U17	3	(3)
2002–2003	South Korea U20	24	(15)
2003–2006	South Korea U23	10 (Note: Includes one appearance and one goal against a club.)	(3)
2006	South Korea	13	(4)

Managerial career
- 2023: Jeju United (assistant, caretaker)
- 2026–: Jeju SK (assistant)
Medal record
Representing South Korea
Men's football
AFC Youth Championship
Winner	2002 Qatar
- * Club domestic league appearances and goals

- Jung Jo-gook
- Hangul: 정조국
- Hanja: 鄭助國
- RR: Jeong Joguk
- MR: Chŏng Choguk

Jung Jo-gook (Korean: 정조국; Hanja: 鄭助國; born 23 April 1984) is a South Korean football coach and former player. He is currently the assistant coach of the K League 1 club Jeju SK.

== Club career ==
=== FC Seoul ===
In 2003, after graduating Daesin High School and its football club, Jung joined K League club FC Seoul (then known as Anyang LG Cheetahs), where he started his professional career. In his debut season, he played as a striker, scoring 12 goals during 32 appearances. He was named the league's Rookie of the Year for that year.

In 2004, Jung's performances continued at cup competitions, but did not last at the league. He once again scored double-digit goals during the season, but those included only two goals at the league. He contributed to Seoul's 2006 Korean FA Cup title, but his slump became longer after combining with frequent injuries. He scored the equaliser with a penalty in the second leg of the 2008 K League Championship final against Suwon Samsung Bluewings, but his team failed to win the league title.

During the 2010 season, Jung made clutch moments in crucial matches, achieving the league and league cup double. He had one goal and one assist in the 2010 Korean League Cup final against Jeonbuk Hyundai Motors, and equalised with a penalty in the second leg of the 2010 K League Championship final against Jeju United.

=== Auxerre ===
After spearheading FC Seoul's run to the K League title, Jung agreed terms with French Ligue 1 outfit Auxerre. By accepting Auxerre's contract offer, he became the third Korean at the time to ply his trade in Ligue 1. On 3 January 2010, Jung signed a two-and-a-half-year deal. He made his Auxerre debut on 8 January 2011, coming on as a 62nd-minute substitute in a 2–1 Coupe de France defeat against Wasquehal. On 29 January 2011, he made his Ligue 1 debut, coming on as a 85th-minute substitute in a 2–0 defeat to Caen. In the 2010–11 Ligue 1, he mostly played as a substitute for Auxerre, scoring two goals during 15 appearances including one start.

=== Nancy ===
Jung lost his first-team place at Auxerre early in the 2011–12 season, and subsequently signed for Ligue 1 rivals Nancy on 16 September 2011, on loan until the end of the season. He scored two goals for Nancy in 21 Ligue 1 appearances including three starts. After his loan deal expired, he finished his challenge in France, and returned to South Korea to prepare his mandatory military service.

=== Return to FC Seoul ===
On 6 July 2012, Jung rejoined FC Seoul. On 4 November, he scored equaliser in a 1–1 draw with Suwon Samsung Bluewings, preventing the club's eighth consecutive defeat in Super Matches. On 21 November, he scored the winning goal in a 1–0 win over Jeju United, where Seoul determined their league title. After contributing to Seoul's league title again, he enlisted in police's football club of the K League 2 to serve alternative civilian service.

On 26 September 2014, Jung came back to Seoul, but was pushed to the bench until the 2015 season by other strikers Park Chu-young, Adriano Michael Jackson, and Yun Ju-tae.

==== Enlistment in Ansan Police ====
In January 2013, Jung enlisted in Police FC (renamed Ansan Police in 2014) after receiving a four-week basic military training. In the inaugural season of the K League 2, Police FC showed unusual rivalry with military team Sangju Sangmu. He and Police FC took second place, following Sangju Sangmu.

Jung scored 16 goals in 36 league appearances while playing for Ansan Police for one and a half years. He was discharged from Ansan in the middle of the 2014 season after finishing his alternative service.

=== Gwangju FC ===
On 11 January 2016, Jung moved to another K League 1 club Gwangju FC. At Gwangju, he spent the best season of his career by scoring 20 goals in 31 league matches. At the end of the 2016 season, he was named the K League 1 Most Valuable Player in addition to the top goalscorer.

=== Gangwon FC ===
After the season at Gwangju, Jung considered negotiating with J1 League club Yokohama F. Marinos, but chose Gangwon FC, which gave an offer later. He scored 16 goals in 74 league matches for three years at Gangwon, and captained the club in the 2018 season.

In a K League 1 match against Pohang Steelers on 23 June 2019, Jung was put into the field in the 58th minute when opponents held a 4–0 lead, and helped his team gain a come-from-behind victory. He provided an assist followed by the team's first goal, and scored the team's fifth goal, which became the winning goal.

=== Retirement ===
In 2020, Jung spent the last year of his playing career at K League 2 club Jeju United. He was not a main player, but won the K League 2 title. At the end of the season, he retired as a player, and started his coaching career at Jeju.

== International career ==
Jung represented South Korea at the 2002 AFC Youth Championship and the 2003 FIFA World Youth Championship. At the AFC Youth Championship, he scored in all three matches of the knockout stage including the 1–0 final win over Japan.

Jung played for South Korea's senior national team in 13 matches including three AFC Asian Cup qualifiers in 2006.

== Career statistics ==
=== Club ===
Appearances and goals by club, season and competition
Club	Season	League			National cup		League cup		Continental		Other		Total	
Club	Season	Division	Apps	Goals	Apps	Goals	Apps	Goals	Apps	Goals	Apps	Goals	Apps	Goals
FC Seoul	2003	K League	32	12	0	0	—		—		—		32	12
FC Seoul	2004	K League	18	2	2	5	12	6	—		—		32	13
FC Seoul	2005	K League	16	3	2	1	10	0	—		—		28	4
FC Seoul	2006	K League	17	4	3	1	10	2	—		0	0	30	7
FC Seoul	2007	K League	12	2	3	0	7	3	—		—		22	5
FC Seoul	2008	K League	11	6	0	0	7	1	—		3 (Note: Appearances in K League Championship)	2	21	9
FC Seoul	2009	K League	20	6	1	1	4	0	7	4	1	1	33	12
FC Seoul	2010	K League	24	11	1	0	3	1	—		2	1	30	13
FC Seoul	Total		150	46	12	8	53	13	7	4	6	4	228	75
Auxerre	2010–11	Ligue 1	15	2	1	0	0	0	—		—		16	2
Auxerre	2011–12	Ligue 1	1	0	0	0	0	0	—		—		1	0
Auxerre	Total		16	2	1	0	0	0	—		—		17	2
Auxerre B	2010–11	National 2	1	0	—		—		—		—		1	0
Auxerre B	2011–12	National 2	2	0	—		—		—		—		2	0
Auxerre B	Total		3	0	—		—		—		—		3	0
Nancy (loan)	2011–12	Ligue 1	20	2	1	0	0	0	—		—		21	2
FC Seoul	2012	K League	17	4	0	0	—		—		—		17	4
FC Seoul	2014	K League 1	2	0	1	0	—		0	0	—		3	0
FC Seoul	2015	K League 1	11	1	1	2	—		6	2	—		18	5
FC Seoul	Total		30	5	2	2	—		6	2	—		38	9
Ansan Police	2013	K League 2	24	9	1	0	—		—		—		25	9
Ansan Police	2014	K League 2	12	7	0	0	—		—		—		12	7
Ansan Police	Total		36	16	1	0	—		—		—		37	16
Gwangju FC	2016	K League 1	31	20	0	0	—		—		—		31	20
Gangwon FC	2017	K League 1	18	7	1	0	—		—		—		19	7
Gangwon FC	2018	K League 1	25	4	0	0	—		—		—		25	4
Gangwon FC	2019	K League 1	31	5	0	0	—		—		—		31	5
Gangwon FC	Total		74	16	1	0	—		—		—		75	16
Jeju United FC	2020	K League 2	12	1	2	1	—		—		—		14	2
Career total			372	108	20	11	53	13	13	6	6	4	464	142

=== International ===
Scores and results list South Korea's goal tally first.

List of international goals scored by Jung Jo-gook
No	Date	Venue	Opponent	Score	Result	Competition
1	16 August 2006	Zhongshan Soccer Stadium, Taipei, Taiwan	Chinese Taipei	2–0	3–0	2007 AFC Asian Cup qualification
2	6 September 2006	Suwon World Cup Stadium, Suwon, South Korea	Chinese Taipei	2–0	8–0	2007 AFC Asian Cup qualification
3	6 September 2006	Suwon World Cup Stadium, Suwon, South Korea	Chinese Taipei	4–0	8–0	2007 AFC Asian Cup qualification
4	6 September 2006	Suwon World Cup Stadium, Suwon, South Korea	Chinese Taipei	8–0	8–0	2007 AFC Asian Cup qualification

== Honours ==
FC Seoul

- K League 1: 2010, 2012
- Korean FA Cup: 2015
- Korean League Cup: 2006, 2010

Jeju United

- K League 2: 2020

South Korea U20

- AFC Youth Championship: 2002

Individual

- K League All-Star: 2003, 2008, 2013
- K League Rookie of the Year: 2003
- Korean FA Cup top goalscorer: 2004
- K League 1 Most Valuable Player: 2016
- K League 1 top goalscorer: 2016
- K League 1 Best XI: 2016
