= History of FC Seoul =

South Korean football club

This article documents the history of FC Seoul, a Korean association football club based in Seoul. For a general overview of the club, see FC Seoul.

== Founding and early years (1983–1989) ==
FC Seoul was officially announced on 18 August as the new club and founded on 22 December 1983 (41 years ago) as Lucky-Goldstar Football Club, owned and financially supported by the Lucky-Goldstar Group (now LG Group), with Chungcheong Province as its franchise and Hwangso (Hwangso means bull) as its mascot. In order to launch the professional football club, Lucky Goldstar Group had a preparation period from 1982 and demanded that original franchise should be Seoul. In the 1984 season, the club finished seventh out of the eight clubs. The club fared better in 1985 when they won the Championship with the help of Thai international Piyapong Pue-On, who was the top goalscorer, as well as the league leader in assists.

== Seoul era (1990–1995) ==
From the beginning of 1988, Lucky-Goldstar Hwangso pushed forward a relocation to Seoul At the end of the 1989 season, the Korea Professional Football League (renamed as the K League in 1998), worried about the financial stability of the clubs, invited a number of clubs to play in Seoul. Thus, the Lucky-Goldstar Hwangso, which had always wanted to be based in the capital, moved to Seoul Stadium (Currently Dongdaemun Stadium) in Seoul at the end of 1989. The club finished the first season in Seoul as champions. The club changed its name to LG Cheetahs in 1991, after the LG Twins, a professional baseball team owned by LG Group.

== Anyang era (1996–2003) ==
After several seasons in Seoul, the club was forced to move in 1996, as part of the K League's decentralization policy. As a result, the club did not leave Seoul but moved to the city of Anyang, a satellite city of Seoul, and was now known as the Anyang LG Cheetahs. In the upcoming years, a solid base of supporters was formed, and it established a strong league rivalry with the Suwon Samsung Bluewings, partly fueled also by the fact that LG Group and Samsung Group, which owned the Suwon club, were also considered rivals in the business world, especially in electronics. The club continued to grow and, in 2000, they won their third Championship, behind the firepower of striker Choi Yong-Soo.

== Returning to Seoul and Renamed FC Seoul (2004–2006) ==
For the 2002 FIFA World Cup in Korea and Japan, ten new stadiums of World Cup standards were built in Korea. After the World Cup, the Korean World Cup Organizing Committee and the KFA supported the move of regional K League clubs into the new stadium. This was designed to avoid, or at least minimize, any financial losses through having to maintain a stadium in playing condition without regular income. However, due to the previous decision by the K League to exclude any member club from being based in Seoul, Seoul World Cup Stadium remained vacant, except as a host of some international friendlies. Thus, the city government of Seoul and the KFA both actively sought for a K League club to play at the stadium to take on the cost of maintaining the stadium.

Initially, it was intended to create a new club, but when it later transpired that any club playing in Seoul World Cup Stadium would have to pay partially for the construction fees of the stadium, this would have placed an unreasonable burden on a fledgling club. Thus, the KFA tried to lure one of the current clubs to Seoul.

The Anyang LG Cheetahs, with the financial backing of the LG Group (who not only viewed the move to Seoul as a way to increase its advertising presence, but had the right to come back to Seoul because it had its franchise moved by force in the 1990s) announced in February 2004 that it would pay the share of the construction fees (which turned out to be 15 billion wons, or at that time US$15 million). This proposed move provoked controversy from the Korean football fans. KFA and K League failed to launch new football club based in Seoul. Because many companies gave up due to Seoul franchise fee. So KFA and K League permitted relocation of Anyang LG Cheetahs.

=== Seoul–Suwon derby ===
The Seoul–Suwon derby's origin is the Anyang–Suwon derby (Jijidae Derby). Anyang was a part of LG Electronics and Suwon is owned Samsung Electronics. The two companies were the biggest rivals in their market. On the day of the Jijidae derby, the chairmen of both sides came to watch this game. So spontaneously, many people considered it to be a rivalry. In 2004, Anyang moved to Seoul. Many fans thought the derby between LG and Samsung would cease to have much importance. However, the match-ups were still considered the biggest event of the K League by the news media. Furthermore, the fans of both FC Seoul and Suwon Samsung have a very bad relationship. This ensured the survival of the derby between Seoul and Suwon, which is now considered to be the biggest derby of the K League. The Seoul–Suwon derby recorded an attendance of 55,397 on April 8, 2007, a record for a South Korean professional sports event at that time. FC Seoul also has a derby with Incheon United.

== Şenol Güneş years (2007–2009) ==
Şenol Güneş managed FC Seoul for a three-year period from December 8, 2006. The club had a fantastic start to their season. FC Seoul won every match, with a spectacular result in the Seoul–Suwon derby match. FC Seoul defeated Suwon Samsung 4–1. But mid-season, it began to fall apart through injuries to key players. Following a draw with Gwangju Sangmu, Seoul could not score and was defeated by Suwon Samsung. 80% of the regular squad was injured. FC Seoul failed to enter into the play-off phase of the season. However, they succeeded in getting into the final of the League Cup. The second season under Güneş was different. There were no major injuries and although Park Chu-young, the ace of FC Seoul, transferred to AS Monaco, the double dragons of FC Seoul (Ki Sung-Yong, Lee Chung-Yong) made big progress and Dejan Damjanović scored 14 goals. This resulted in a second-place finish in the K League regular season, and progress to the playoffs. FC Seoul defeated Ulsan Hyundai in the play-off semi-final but was defeated by Suwon in the final. Despite the final loss, the club still advanced into the AFC Champions League. The Şenol Güneş era ended on November 25, 2009, with the manager returning to Trabzonspor.

=== AFC Champions League, 2009 ===
FC Seoul had its first appearance in the AFC Champions League in 2009. They won their first match in the league against Sriwijaya FC. After showing poor form in several matches after that, it looked impossible for Seoul to qualify for the second round, but a dramatic come-from-behind victory over reigning champion Gamba Osaka and Sriwijaya's unexpected victory over Shandong Luneng enabled them to advance to the second round with taking second place in Group F. On June 24, 2009, they beat the Kashima Antlers in the Round of 16 and went on to the quarterfinal.

== Nelo Vingada year (2010) ==
FC Seoul appointed Nelo Vingada as the manager on December 14, 2009. Vingada won K League Cup, K League with FC Seoul. His record was 20 Wins, 2 draws, 6 losses in 2010 season. His winning percentage (71%) is the highest winning record in the K League.

FC Seoul recorded an attendance of 60,747 on May 5, 2010, at Seoul World Cup Stadium, This is the highest single-match attendance record of South Korean professional sports history. FC Seoul also recorded the single-season (League, Championship, League Cup) the highest total attendance new record - 546,397 and the single-regular & post season (League, Championship) the highest average attendance new record - 32,576.

On December 13, 2010, FC Seoul wanted to extend the one-year contract but FC Seoul and Vingada could not agree on salary conditions so Vingada went back to Portugal.

=== The Double ===
In 2010, FC Seoul beat Jeonbuk Hyundai Motors at Posco Cup 2010 final match and became the Posco Cup 2010 Winner. FC Seoul were crowned K League champions as a 2–1 win over Jeju United in the second leg of the play-off series final saw them triumph 4–3 on aggregate in K League Championship Final. Also, FC Seoul recorded 56,759 spectators in K League Championship 2nd leg; this became the K League Championship's new highest attendance record. This is the first double in FC Seoul's history.

== Choi Yong-Soo years (2011-present) ==
FC Seoul legend Choi Yong-Soo was chosen to manage the club from 2012, after previously serving as the assistant manager and caretaker of the club in 2011. Seoul were crowned K League champions in 2012 and placed runners-up in 2013 AFC Champions League.

== See also ==
- FC Seoul
- Football in Seoul
