= Song Chong-gug =

South Korean footballer (born 1979)

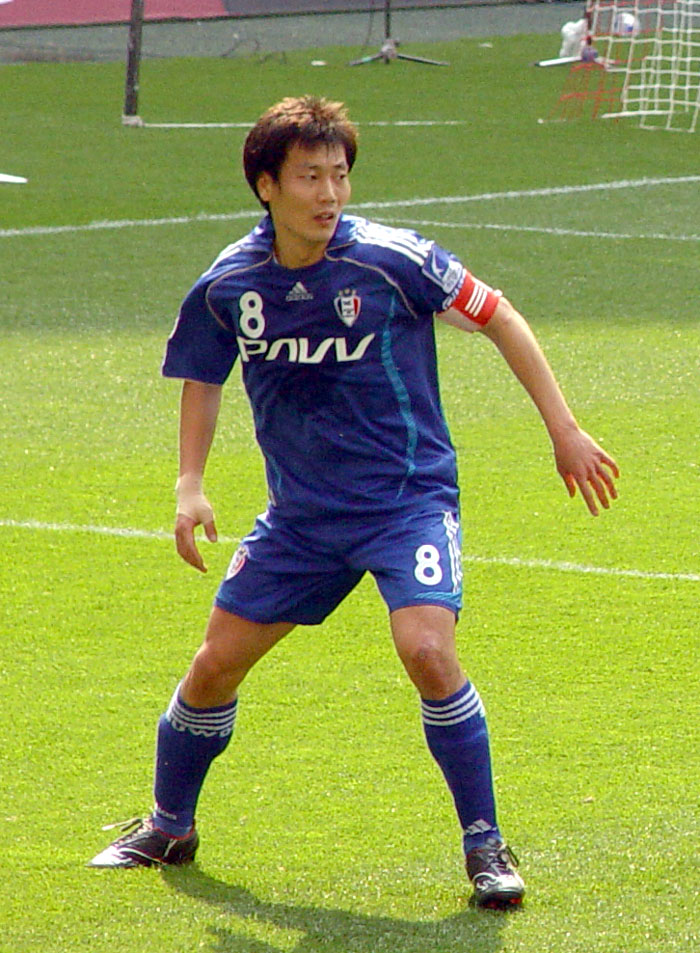
- Song with Suwon Samsung Bluewings in 2008

Personal information
- Full name: Song Chong-gug
- Date of birth: 20 February 1979 (age 47)
- Place of birth: Danyang, Chungbuk, South Korea
- Height: 1.75 m (5 ft 9 in)
- Positions: Right-back; defensive midfielder

College career
Years	Team	Apps	(Gls)
1997–2000	Yonsei University		

Senior career*
Years	Team	Apps	(Gls)
2001–2002	Busan I'Cons	34	(4)
2002–2005	Feyenoord	53	(2)
2005–2010	Suwon Samsung Bluewings	95	(2)
2010	Al-Shabab	7	(2)
2011	Ulsan Hyundai	13	(0)
2011	Tianjin TEDA	14	(1)
Total		216	(11)

International career
1997–1999	South Korea U20	11	(0)
2000	South Korea U23	2	(0)
2000–2007	South Korea	60	(3)
Medal record
Representing South Korea
Men's football
AFC Asian Cup
Bronze medal – third place	2007 Indonesia/Malaysia /Thailand/Vietnam
AFC Youth Championship
Winner	1998 Thailand
- * Club domestic league appearances and goals

- Song Chong-gug
- Hangul: 송종국
- Hanja: 宋鐘國
- RR: Song Jongguk
- MR: Song Chongguk

Song Chong-gug (Korean: 송종국; born 20 February 1979) is a South Korean former footballer who played as a defender or defensive midfielder. He played for the South Korea national team at the 2002 and 2006 FIFA World Cups.

== Playing career ==
=== Early career ===
In June 2000, Song made his senior international debut against Macedonia under manager Huh Jung-moo when he was a university student. In 2001, Song started his professional career at K League club Busan I'Cons after graduating from Yonsei University. He was named the K League Rookie of the Year in his first season. Guus Hiddink, a new manager of the South Korea national team, quickly chose him as a member of the national team for the 2002 FIFA World Cup, and tested him in various midfield and defensive positions. As a result, he played as a right-back at the tournament.

While South Korea finished fourth at the 2002 World Cup, Song was the only outfield player of the national team to play all of 687 minutes in seven matches. He also nullified Luís Figo perfectly by blocking all twelve of his dribbles without a concession, making a memorable match against Portugal. He sometimes talks about his experience in marking Figo when appearing on South Korean television programs.

=== Feyenoord ===
After the 2002 World Cup, Tottenham Hotspur and Arsenal approached Busan I'Cons to get Song, but Busan intentionally delayed negotiations in order to keep him. He strongly expressed his intention to leave for a European club by moving his belongings out of the club after his deals with Premier League clubs were scuttled. He eventually joined Eredivisie club Feyenoord, and played 56 matches including UEFA Champions League matches for Feyenoord during two seasons under manager Bert van Marwijk. However, his capability regressed due to ankle injuries, and he completely lost his place at the club after Van Marwijk was replaced by Ruud Gullit.

=== Suwon Samsung Bluewings ===
In January 2005, Song joined K League club Suwon Samsung Bluewings after leaving Feyenoord. In October, he injured his ankle again, and eventually underwent an operation. He came back to the field after five months, with his ability debased largely.

Song was selected for the national team for the 2006 FIFA World Cup despite concern about his condition, playing the first group stage match against Togo. He successfully obstructed opponents' striker Emmanuel Adebayor, and provided an assist for teammate Ahn Jung-hwan's winning goal. His performances against Togo were better than expected, but he was excluded from subsequent matches by manager Dick Advocaat.

Song became Suwon's key player after the 2006 World Cup, and received the armband in 2008. He scored the winning goal in the 2008 K League Championship final, leading his team to win a league title.

=== Retirement ===
Song played for Al-Shabab, Ulsan Hyundai, and Tianjin TEDA after leaving Suwon in the summer of 2010. He was released by Tianjin at the end of the 2011 season, and announced his retirement in March 2012.

== Personal life ==
In 2003, Song married Kim Jung-ah to the surprise of many of his fans after dating Kim since April 2001. Before the marriage, he had been linked with multiple celebrities including Lee Jin, a member of a Korean girl band Fin.K.L. He presented a bigger surprise three years later by getting divorced. On 17 December 2006, he married an actress and model Park Yun-soo after an 18-month relationship. The wedding was held privately in front of 100 family and friends. Song became a father six months after the wedding. In October 2015, however, Song once again divorced his wife.

In September 2021, Song signed with DH Entertainment.

== Career statistics ==
=== Club ===
Appearances and goals by club, season and competition
Club	Season	League			National Cup		League Cup		Continental		Other		Total	
Club	Season	Division	Apps	Goals	Apps	Goals	Apps	Goals	Apps	Goals	Apps	Goals	Apps	Goals
Busan I'Cons	2001	K League	25	2	?	?	10	0	—		—		35	2
Busan I'Cons	2002	K League	9	2	?	?	1	0	—		—		10	2
Busan I'Cons	Total		34	4	?	?	11	0	—		—		45	4
Feyenoord	2002–03	Eredivisie	18	1	3	0	—		6	0	—		27	1
Feyenoord	2003–04	Eredivisie	25	1	1	0	—		3	0	—		29	1
Feyenoord	2004–05	Eredivisie	10	0	0	0	—		4	0	—		14	0
Feyenoord	Total		53	2	4	0	—		13	0	—		70	2
Suwon Samsung Bluewings	2005	K League	9	0	0	0	11	1	2	0	0	0	22	1
Suwon Samsung Bluewings	2006	K League	23	0	4	0	4	0	—		—		31	0
Suwon Samsung Bluewings	2007	K League	24	0	2	0	9	0	—		—		35	0
Suwon Samsung Bluewings	2008	K League	23	2	1	0	6	0	—		—		30	2
Suwon Samsung Bluewings	2009	K League	9	0	1	0	2	0	5	0	—		17	0
Suwon Samsung Bluewings	2010	K League	7	0	1	0	3	0	6	0	—		17	0
Suwon Samsung Bluewings	Total		95	2	9	0	35	1	13	0	0	0	152	3
Al-Shabab	2010–11	Saudi Pro League	7	2	?	?	?	?	3	0	—		10	2
Ulsan Hyundai	2011	K League	13	0	1	0	5	0	—		—		19	0
Tianjin Teda	2011	Chinese Super League	14	1	2	0	—		—		—		16	1
Career total			216	11	16	0	51	1	29	0	0	0	312	12

=== International ===
Appearances and goals by national team and year
National team	Year	Apps	Goals
South Korea	2000	2	0
South Korea	2001	14	1
South Korea	2002	22	2
South Korea	2003	3	0
South Korea	2004	8	0
South Korea	2006	8	0
South Korea	2007	3	0
Career total		60	3

Results list South Korea's goal tally first.

List of international goals scored by Song Chong-gug
No.	Date	Venue	Opponent	Score	Result	Competition
1	11 February 2001	Dubai, United Arab Emirates	United Arab Emirates	1–1	4–1	2001 Dubai Tournament
2	19 January 2002	Pasadena, United States	United States	1–1	1–2	2002 CONCACAF Gold Cup
3	29 June 2002	Daegu, South Korea	Turkey	2–3	2–3	2002 FIFA World Cup

== Filmography ==
=== Television ===
Year	Title	Role	Note(s)	Ref.
2012	Dancing with the Stars Season 2	Himself		
2013–2014	Dad! Where Are We Going?	Himself		
2020	Let's Play Soccer	Himself	Episode 48	
2022	Gundesliga	Himself		

== Honours ==
Busan I'Cons

- Korean League Cup runner-up: 2001

Feyenoord

- KNVB Cup runner-up: 2002–03

Suwon Samsung Bluewings

- K League 1: 2008
- Korean FA Cup: 2009
- Korean League Cup: 2005, 2008
- Korean Super Cup: 2005
- A3 Champions Cup: 2005
- Pan-Pacific Championship: 2009

Tianjin TEDA

- Chinese FA Cup: 2011

South Korea U20

- AFC Youth Championship: 1998

South Korea

- AFC Asian Cup third place: 2007

Individual

- K League All-Star: 2001, 2002, 2006, 2007
- AFC Player of the Month: November 2001
- K League Rookie of the Year: 2001
- K League 1 Best XI: 2001
- AFC Opta All-time XI at the FIFA World Cup: 2020

Sporting positions
Preceded by Lee Kwan-woo	Suwon Samsung Bluewings captain 2008	Succeeded by Kwak Hee-ju
