= 2000 K League Championship =

Tournament details
- Host country: South Korea
- Dates: 1–15 November 2000
- Teams: 4

Final positions
- Champions: Anyang LG Cheetahs
- Runners-up: Bucheon SK

Tournament statistics
- Matches played: 5
- Goals scored: 19 (3.8 per match)
- Attendance: 63,366 (12,673 per match)
- Top scorer(s): Hwang Yeon-seok; Lee Eul-yong; Lee Won-shik; Gwak Kyung-keun; André (2 goals each)

The 2000 K League Championship was the seventh competition of the K League Championship, and was held to decide the 18th champions of the K League. It was contested between the top four clubs of the regular season. The first round was played as a single match between third place and fourth place of the regular season. The winners of the first round advanced to the semi-final, and played against runners-up of the regular season over two legs. The winners of the regular season directly qualified for the best-of-three final.

== Qualified teams ==
| Pos | Team | Pld | W | PW | L | GF | GA | GD | Pts | Qualification |
|---|---|---|---|---|---|---|---|---|---|---|
| 1 | Anyang LG Cheetahs | 27 | 17 | 2 | 8 | 46 | 25 | +21 | 53 | Qualification for the playoffs final |
| 2 | Seongnam Ilhwa Chunma | 27 | 12 | 6 | 9 | 43 | 33 | +10 | 42 | Qualification for the playoffs semi-final |
| 3 | Jeonbuk Hyundai Motors | 27 | 11 | 4 | 12 | 34 | 40 | −6 | 37 | Qualification for the playoffs first round |
| 4 | Bucheon SK | 27 | 10 | 6 | 11 | 45 | 35 | +10 | 36 | Qualification for the playoffs first round |

Source: RSSSF
Rules for classification: W) 3 points; WP) 1 point, no extra time

== Bracket ==
First round
3 | Jeonbuk Hyundai Motors | 1
4 | Bucheon SK (a.e.t.) | 2

Semi-final
2 | Seongnam Ilhwa Chunma | 1 | 3 | 4
1R | Bucheon SK (a.e.t.) | 3 | 2 | 5

Final
SF | Bucheon SK | 1 | 1 (2) | X | 0W
1 | Anyang LG Cheetahs | 4 | 1 (4) | X | 2W

== First round ==
1 November 2000
15:00 KST

| Jeonbuk Hyundai Motors | 1–2 (a.e.t.) | Bucheon SK |
|---|---|---|
| Park Sung-bae 53' | Report | Lee Lim-saeng 66'; Lee Won-shik 94' |

Jeonju Sports Complex Stadium, Jeonju
Attendance: 10,068
Referee: Cha Deok-hwan

== Semi-final ==
=== First leg ===
5 November 2000
15:00 KST

| Seongnam Ilhwa Chunma | 1–3 | Bucheon SK |
|---|---|---|
| Hwang Yeon-seok 46' | Report | Lee Eul-yong 20'; Gwak Kyung-keun 47'; Jeon Kyung-joon 85' |

Seongnam Sports Complex, Seongnam
Attendance: 11,758
Referee: Lee Jae-sung

=== Second leg ===
8 November 2000
19:00 KST

| Bucheon SK | 2–3 (a.e.t.) | Seongnam Ilhwa Chunma |
|---|---|---|
| Lee Sung-jae 59'; Lee Eul-yong 102' | Report | Park Nam-yeol 51'; Woo Sung-moon 66'; Hwang Yeon-seok 78' |

Mokdong Stadium, Seoul
Attendance: 6,832
Referee: Son Jong-deok

Bucheon SK won 5–4 on aggregate.

== Final ==
=== First leg ===
12 November 2000
15:00 KST

| Bucheon SK | 1–4 | Anyang LG Cheetahs |
|---|---|---|
| Lee Won-shik 84' | Report | Wang Jung-hyun 58'; Jung Kwang-min 67'; André 79'; Choi Yong-soo 89' |

Mokdong Stadium, Seoul
Attendance: 13,825
Referee: Han Byung-hwa

=== Second leg ===
15 November 2000
18:30 KST

| Anyang LG Cheetahs | 1–1 (a.e.t.) | Bucheon SK |
|---|---|---|
| André 76' | Report | Gwak Kyung-keun 59' |
Penalties
| Kim Sung-il (penalty scored); André (penalty scored); Kim Seong-jae (penalty scored); Han Sang-gu (penalty missed); Ricardo Campos (penalty scored) | 4–2 | (penalty scored) Lee Lim-saeng; (penalty missed) Gwak Kyung-keun; (penalty scored) Kim Gi-dong; (penalty missed) Kang Chul |

Anyang Sports Complex, Anyang
Attendance: 20,883
Referee: Lee Sang-yong

Anyang LG Cheetahs won the series 2–0.

== Final table ==
| Pos | Team | Qualification |
|---|---|---|
| 1 | Anyang LG Cheetahs (C) | Qualification for the Asian Club Championship |
| 2 | Bucheon SK | |
| 3 | Seongnam Ilhwa Chunma | |
| 4 | Jeonbuk Hyundai Motors | Qualification for the Cup Winners' Cup |

Source: RSSSF
(C) Champions

== See also ==
- 2000 K League
