= Park No-bong =

South Korean footballer (born 1961)

Park No-bong 박노봉
Personal information
- Full name: Park No-bong
- Date of birth: June 19, 1961 (age 65)
- Place of birth: South Korea
- Height: 1.78 m (5 ft 10 in)
- Position: Defender

Youth career
- 1981–1984: Korea University

Senior career*
Years	Team	Apps	(Gls)
1985–1991	Daewoo Royals	142	(4)

International career
1983–1984	South Korea	6	(0)
- * Club domestic league appearances and goals

- Park No-bong
- Hangul: 박노봉
- RR: Bak Nobong
- MR: Pak Nobong

Park No-bong (Korean: 박노봉; born June 19, 1961, in South Korea) is a South Korean former footballer who played as a defender.

He started his professional career at Daewoo Royals in 1985.

He was part of the K League Best XI in 1986 K League.
