= Anton Song =

South Korean footballer (born 2007)

Personal information
- Date of birth: 31 December 2007 (age 18)
- Place of birth: Russia
- Height: 1.86 m (6 ft 1 in)
- Position: Goalkeeper

Team information
- Current team: Busan IPark
- Number: 70

Youth career
- –2022: Saha FC
- 2022–: Busan IPark

Senior career*
Years	Team	Apps	(Gls)
2026–	Busan IPark	0	(0)
- * Club domestic league appearances and goals

Anton Song (Korean: 송안톤; born 31 December 2007) is a South Korean professional footballer who plays as a goalkeeper for Busan IPark.

== Early life ==
Song was born on 31 December 2007. Born in Russia, he was born to a Russian mother and a South Korean father. Growing up, he attended Kaesong High School in South Korea and regarded Spain international David Raya and Germany international Manuel Neuer as his football idols.

== Career ==
As a youth player, Song joined the youth academy of South Korean side Saha FC. Following his stint there, he joined the youth academy of South Korean side Busan IPark in 2023 and was promoted to the club's senior team ahead of the 2026 season.

== Style of play ==
Song plays as a goalkeeper. Korean wrote in 2026 that he "possesses a solid physique and quick reflexes, enabling him to maintain reliable goal defense. His exceptional kicking and build-up skills, combined with his defensive coordination, also make him a promising goalkeeper".
