= 2005 K League Championship =

Tournament details
- Host country: South Korea
- Dates: 20 November – 4 December 2005
- Teams: 4

Final positions
- Champions: Ulsan Hyundai Horang-i
- Runners-up: Incheon United

Tournament statistics
- Matches played: 4
- Goals scored: 14 (3.5 per match)
- Attendance: 95,910 (23,978 per match)
- Top scorer(s): Lee Chun-soo (4 goals)

The 2005 K League Championship was the ninth competition of the K League Championship, and was held to decide the 23rd champions of the K League. After the regular season was finished, the first stage winners, the second stage winners, and the top two clubs in the overall table qualified for the championship. Each semi-final was played as a single match, and the final consisted of two matches.

== Qualified teams ==
Club	Placement
Busan IPark	First stage winners
Seongnam Ilhwa Chunma	Second stage winners Overall table 2nd place
Incheon United	Overall table 1st place
Ulsan Hyundai Horang-i	Overall table 3rd place

== Bracket ==
Semi-finals
Busan IPark	0
Incheon United	2
Seongnam Ilhwa Chunma	1
Ulsan Hyundai Horang-i	2

Final
Incheon United	1	2	3
Ulsan Hyundai Horang-i	5	1	6

== Semi-finals ==
20 November 2005

Busan IPark	0–2	Incheon United
	Report	Bang Seung-hwan 65'; Lee Sang-hun 77'

Busan Asiad Main Stadium, Busan
Attendance: 13,475

20 November 2005

Seongnam Ilhwa Chunma	1–2	Ulsan Hyundai Horang-i
Nam Ki-il 18'	Report	Lee Chun-soo 46'; Lee Jin-ho 83'

Tancheon Sports Complex, Seongnam
Attendance: 12,427

== Final ==
=== First leg ===
27 November 2005
14:30 KST

Incheon United	1–5	Ulsan Hyundai Horang-i
Radončić 89'	Report	Machado 13', 58'; Lee Chun-soo 37', 46', 72'

Incheon Munhak Stadium, Incheon
Attendance: 35,356
Referee: Ko Keum-bok (South Korea)

=== Second leg ===
4 December 2005
14:00 KST

Ulsan Hyundai Horang-i	1–2	Incheon United
Choi Sung-kuk 18'	Report	Radončić 14', 26'

Ulsan Munsu Football Stadium, Ulsan
Attendance: 34,652
Referee: Lee Sang-yong (South Korea)

Ulsan Hyundai Horang-i won 6–3 on aggregate.

== Final table ==
Pos	Team	Qualification
1	Ulsan Hyundai Horang-i (C)	Qualification for the Champions League
2	Incheon United	
3	Seongnam Ilhwa Chunma	
4	Busan IPark	

Source: RSSSF
(C) Champions

== See also ==
- 2005 in South Korean football
- 2005 K League
