= K League Junior =

South Korean youth football league

- Organising body: K League
- Founded: 22 March 2008
- Country: South Korea
- Website: kleague.com/youth/junior.do

K League Junior (Korean: K리그 주니어) is a South Korean youth football league system managed and organised by the K League. It was first introduced in 2008 as the SBS High School Club Challenge League, subsequently becoming the Adidas All-in Challenge League before rebranding as K League Junior in 2014.

== History ==
The SBS High School Club Challenge League was founded in 2008 to expand youth football in South Korea and identify domestic talent. From 2008, all professional teams in the K League were required to operate a youth system to further the development of Korean football. The league was initially sponsored by broadcaster SBS, which aired some matches live on television. Eight under-18 teams, each affiliated with a professional K League club, participated in the first season, which was won by Ulsan Hyundai. By 2012, the league had expanded to sixteen teams and the league was renamed as the Adidas All In Challenge League, with Adidas as the title sponsor. When the K League Challenge was launched as the second division of professional football in 2013, the name of the youth league was changed to K League Junior to avoid confusion.

In 2019, an under-15 league was established. The following year, K League made it compulsory for all clubs in the professional leagues to operate U-12, U-15 and U-18 youth teams. The start of the 2020 league was delayed due to the COVID-19 pandemic, and matches took place with no spectators.

== Structure ==
=== U-18 ===
==== Historical ====
The High School Club Challenge League was initially split into two groups: Group A (Central) and Group B (South). From 2008-2011 the two groups operated as separate leagues, with a tournament or championship final to determine the overall winner. In 2012 the format changed, with both groups still playing two separate leagues, but with inter-league matches organised between the two, and the top-ranking teams from both groups progressing to the King of Kings tournament. From 2013-2014, the Challenge League operated as one unified league competition. Until 2018, K League Junior continued to operate two entirely separate leagues during the year for both groups, but from 2019 it adopted the split system used by K League 1, with the top teams from both groups becoming a top division and the lower ranked teams becoming a separate lower division for the second half of the competition. The teams finishing in first and second place in the top division were then regarded as the overall champions and runners-up.

==== Current ====
Since 2024, K League Junior U18 teams have been divided into three groups based on geographical location, with eight teams each in Groups A (North) and B (Central) and nine teams in Group C (South). The league continues to use a split system to determine the divisions for the second half of the year. In the first half of the year each team plays against each other team in their group once. After round 9, the top four teams in Groups A and B, and the top five teams in Group C, proceed to the upper league for the second half of the season, while the remaining teams compete in the lower league.

=== U-15 ===
Like their U18 counterparts, teams in the U15 competition were previously divided into two geographical groups. Since 2024, the U15 tournament has also operated with three groups. However unlike the U18 competition, the groups in the U15 system operate as separate leagues throughout the year with no split system.

== Clubs ==
Group	Club	U-18 team	U-15 team	Location
A	FC Seoul	Seoul Osan High School	FC Seoul U15	Seoul
A	Seoul E-Land	Seoul E-Land FC U18	Seoul E-Land FC U15	Seoul
A	Seongnam FC	Poongsaeng High School	Seongnam FC U15	Seongnam
A	FC Anyang	FC Anyang U18	FC Anyang U18	Anyang
A	Incheon United	Incheon Daegeon High School	Incheon Gwangsung Middle School	Incheon
A	Jeju SK	Jeju SK U18	Jeju Middle School	Seogwipo
A	Cheonan City	Cheonan City FC U18	Cheonan City FC U15	Cheonan
A	Chungnam Asan	Chungnam Asan FC U18	Chungnam Asan FC U15	Asan
B	Gangwon FC	Gangneung Jeil High School	Jumunjin Middle School	Gangneung
B	Gimpo FC	Gimpo FC U18	Gimpo FC U15	Gimpo
B	Daejeon Hana Citizen	Chungnam Mechanical and Technical High School	Daejeon Hana Citizen U15	Daejeon
B	Bucheon FC 1995	Bucheon FC 1995 U18	Bucheon FC 1995 U15	Bucheon
B	Suwon FC	Suwon FC U18	Suwon FC U15	Suwon
B	Suwon Samsung Bluewings	Maetan High School	Suwon Samsung Bluewings U15	Suwon
B	Ansan Greeners	Ansan Greeners FC U18	Ansan Greeners FC U15	Ansan
B	Chungbuk Cheongju	Unho High School	Chungbuk Cheongju FC U15	Cheongju
C	Gyeongnam FC	Jinju High School	Gunbuk Middle School	Jinju
C	Gwangju FC	Geumho High School	Gwangju FC U15	Gwangju
C	Gimcheon Sangmu	Gyeongbuk Beauty Art High School	Munseong Middle School	Gimcheon
C	Daegu FC	Hyunpoong High School	Daegu Yulwon Middle School	Daegu
C	Busan IPark	Gaeseong High School	Nakdong Middle School	Busan
C	Ulsan HD	Ulsan Hyundai High School	Hyundai Middle School	Ulsan
C	Jeonnam Dragons	Gwangyang Steel High School	Gwangyang Steel Middle School	Gwangyang
C	Jeonbuk Hyundai Motors	Jeonju Yeongsaeng High School	Geumsan Middle School	Jeonju
C	Pohang Steelers	Pohang Steel High School	Pohang Steel Middle School	Pohang

== Records ==
=== U-18 ===
==== Pre-split system ====
Season	Champions		Runners-up		Source
Season	Group A	Group B	Group A	Group B	Source
2008	Ulsan Hyundai		Jeonnam Dragons		
2009	FC Seoul		Jeonnam Dragons		
2010	Suwon Samsung		Ulsan Hyundai		
2011	Pohang Steelers		Jeonbuk Hyundai		
2012	Suwon Samsung	Pohang Steelers	Jeonbuk Hyundai	Gwangju FC	
2013	Pohang Steelers		Busan IPark		
2014	Gwangju FC		Jeonnam Dragons		
2015	Incheon United	Ulsan Hyundai	FC Seoul	Pohang Steelers	
2015	Incheon United	Pohang Steelers	Jeju United	Ulsan Hyundai	
2016	Seongnam FC	Ulsan Hyundai	FC Seoul	Pohang Steelers	
2016	Suwon Samsung	Ulsan Hyundai	Incheon United	Pohang Steelers	
2017	Suwon Samsung	Ulsan Hyundai	FC Seoul	Pohang Steelers	
2017	FC Seoul	Ulsan Hyundai	Suwon Samsung	Gwangju FC	
2018	Suwon Samsung	Ulsan Hyundai	FC Seoul	Pohang Steelers	
2018	Suwon Samsung	Gyeongnam FC	FC Seoul	Pohang Steelers	

==== Split system ====
Season	Overall		Group stage						Source(s)
Season	Champions	Runners-up	Winners			Runners-up			Source(s)
Season	Champions	Runners-up	Group A	Group B	Group C	Group A	Group B	Group C	Source(s)
2019	Ulsan Hyundai	Gwangju FC	Suwon Samsung	Pohang Steelers		Suwon FC	Jeonbuk Hyundai		
2020			FC Seoul	Gwangju FC		Suwon Samsung	Jeonbuk Hyundai		
2021	Pohang Steelers	Jeonbuk Hyundai	Gangwon FC	Ulsan Hyundai		FC Seoul	Jeonbuk Hyundai		
2022	FC Seoul	Jeonbuk Hyundai	Gangwon FC	Jeonbuk Hyundai		Suwon FC	Daejeon Hana Citizen		
2023	Pohang Steelers	Jeonnam Dragons	FC Seoul	Jeonbuk Hyundai		Suwon FC	Pohang Steelers		
2024	FC Seoul	Busan IPark	Chungnam Asan	Suwon Samsung	Pohang Steelers	Incheon United	Daejeon Hana Citizen	Ulsan HD	

=== U-15 ===
Season	Champions			Runners-up			Source
Season	Group A	Group B	Group C	Group A	Group B	Group C	Source
2019	Bucheon FC 1995	Jeonbuk Hyundai		Incheon United	Pohang Steelers		
2020	Bucheon FC 1995	Ulsan Hyundai		FC Seoul	Jeonbuk Hyundai		
2021	Suwon Samsung	Daejeon Hana Citizen		FC Seoul	Ulsan Hyundai		
2022	Suwon Samsung	Jeonbuk Hyundai		FC Seoul	Ulsan Hyundai		
2023	Suwon Samsung	Jeonbuk Hyundai		FC Seoul	Pohang Steelers		
2024	FC Seoul	Suwon Samsung	Ulsan HD	Seongnam FC	Daejeon Hana Citizen	Pohang Steelers	
