= 1999 K League Championship =

Tournament details
- Host country: South Korea
- Dates: 17–31 October 1999
- Teams: 4

Final positions
- Champions: Suwon Samsung Bluewings
- Runners-up: Busan Daewoo Royals

Tournament statistics
- Matches played: 5
- Goals scored: 9 (1.8 per match)
- Attendance: 110,489 (22,098 per match)
- Top scorer(s): Ryu Woong-yeol (2 goals)

The 1999 K League Championship was the sixth competition of the K League Championship, and was held to decide the 17th champions of the K League. It was contested between the top four clubs of the regular season. The first round was played as a single match between third place and fourth place of the regular season. The winners of the first round advanced to the semi-final, and played against runners-up of the regular season over two legs. The winners of the regular season directly qualified for the best-of-three final.

== Qualified teams ==
Pos	Team	Pld	W	OW	PW	L	GF	GA	GD	Pts	Qualification
1	Suwon Samsung Bluewings	27	18	2	1	6	56	24	+32	59	Qualification for the playoffs final
2	Bucheon SK	27	11	7	0	9	48	39	+9	47	Qualification for the playoffs semi-final
3	Jeonnam Dragons	27	9	3	5	10	43	38	+5	38	Qualification for the playoffs first round
4	Busan Daewoo Royals	27	10	3	1	13	37	36	+1	37	Qualification for the playoffs first round

Source: RSSSF
Rules for classification: W) 3 points; WG) won with golden goal, 2 points; WP) won after penalty shoot-out, 1 point

== Bracket ==
First round
3	Jeonnam Dragons	0
4	Busan Daewoo Royals	1

Semi-final
2	Bucheon SK	0	0	0
1R	Busan Daewoo Royals	1	1	2

Final
SF	Busan Daewoo Royals	1	1_{aet}	X	0W
1	Suwon Samsung Bluewings	2	2_{aet}	X	2W

== First round ==
17 October 1999
15:30 KST

Jeonnam Dragons	0–1	Busan Daewoo Royals
	Report	Ryu Woong-yeol 30'

Gwangyang Football Stadium, Gwangyang
Attendance: 19,657

== Semi-final ==
=== First leg ===
20 October 1999
15:00 KST

Bucheon SK	0–1	Busan Daewoo Royals
	Report	Woo Sung-yong 24'

Mokdong Stadium, Seoul
Attendance: 12,784

=== Second leg ===
24 October 1999
15:00 KST

Busan Daewoo Royals	1–0	Bucheon SK
Manić 38' (pen.)	Report

Busan Gudeok Stadium, Busan
Attendance: 28,248

Busan Daewoo Royals won 2–0 on aggregate.

== Final ==
=== First leg ===
27 October 1999
19:00 KST

Busan Daewoo Royals	1–2	Suwon Samsung Bluewings
Ryu Woong-yeol 71'	Report	Seol Ik-chan 50'; Park Kun-ha 83'

Busan Gudeok Stadium, Busan
Attendance: 22,375

=== Second leg ===
31 October 1999
18:30 KST

Suwon Samsung Bluewings	2–1 (a.e.t.)	Busan Daewoo Royals
Son Hyun-jun 81' (o.g.); Drakulić 98'	Report	Lee Ki-boo 30'

Suwon Sports Complex, Suwon
Attendance: 27,425

Suwon Samsung Bluewings won the series 2–0.

== Final table ==
Pos	Team	Qualification
1	Suwon Samsung Bluewings (C)	Qualification for the Asian Club Championship
2	Busan Daewoo Royals	
3	Bucheon SK	
4	Jeonnam Dragons	

Source: RSSSF
(C) Champions

== See also ==
- 1999 K League
