= Radivoje Manić =

Serbian footballer (born 1972)

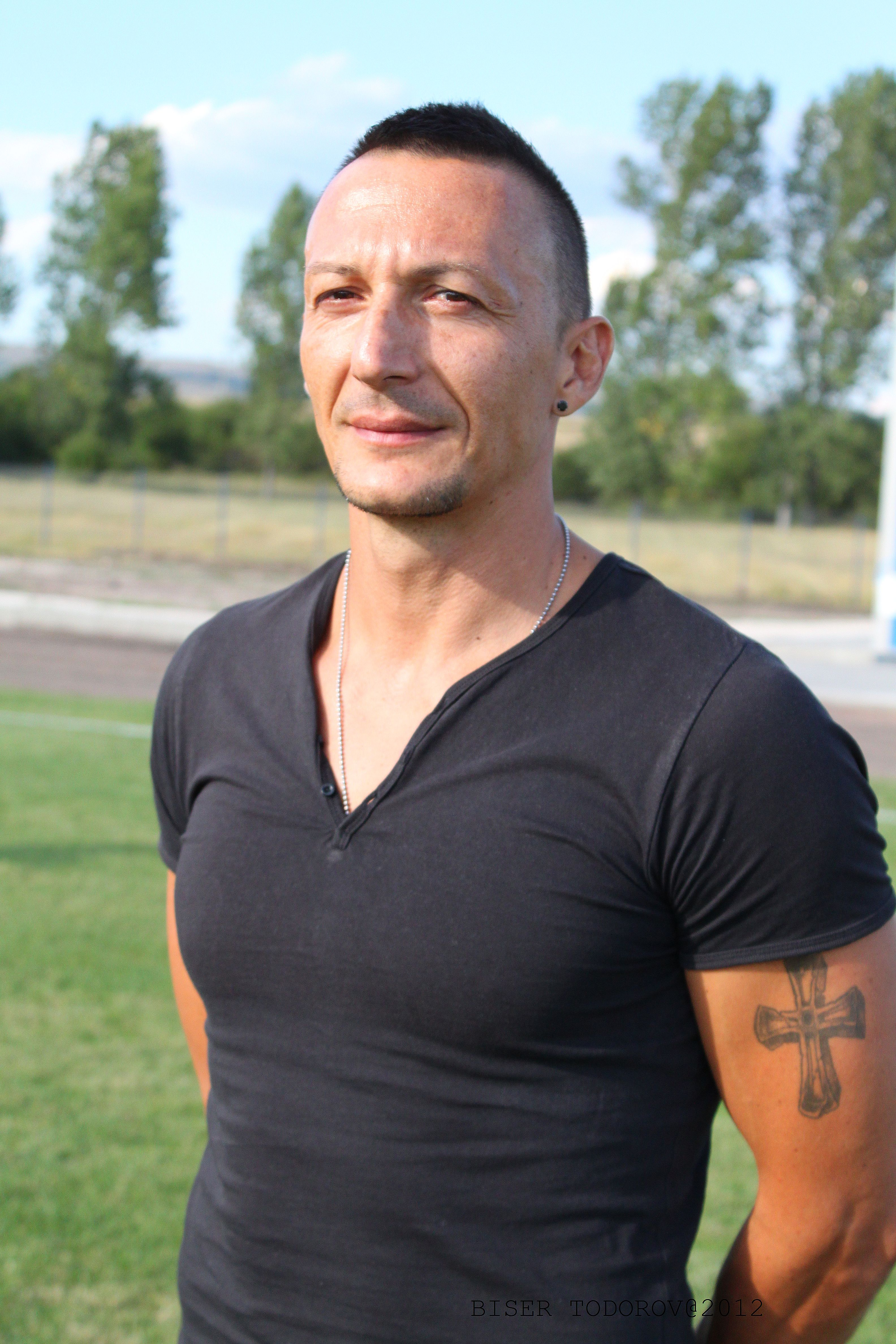
- Manić in 2012

Personal information
- Full name: Radivoje Manić
- Date of birth: 16 January 1972 (age 54)
- Place of birth: Pirot, SFR Yugoslavia
- Height: 1.82 m (5 ft 11 1/2 in)
- Position: Striker

Senior career*
Years	Team	Apps	(Gls)
1988–1991	Radnički Pirot	77	(34)
1991–1992	Radnički Niš	6	(0)
1992	→ Dubočica (loan)	12	(6)
1992–1993	Radnički Pirot	30	(15)
1993–1995	Radnički Niš	69	(35)
1996–2002	Busan I'Cons	113	(35)
1998	→ Cerezo Osaka (loan)	17	(6)
2003–2004	Radnički Pirot	17	(8)
2003	→ Napredak Kruševac (loan)	12	(1)
2004–2005	Incheon United	16	(3)
2006	Radnički Pirot	5	(0)
2006–2007	Sevojno	15	(4)
2007	→ Mladenovac (loan)	11	(3)
Total		400	(150)

International career
1997	FR Yugoslavia	1	(0)

Managerial career
- 2011: Car Konstantin
- 2011–2012: Radnički Pirot
- 2012–2013: Balkanski
- * Club domestic league appearances and goals

Radivoje Manić (Serbian Cyrillic: Радивоје Манић; born 16 January 1972) is a Serbian former professional footballer who played as a striker.

== Club career ==
After impressing at Radnički Niš, Manić moved to South Korea and joined Daewoo Royals in early 1996. He scored 13 league goals in his debut season with the club. In the 1997 campaign, Manić was named in the K League Best XI, as the club won the title. He subsequently moved to Japan and spent one season with Cerezo Osaka, before returning to South Korea in 1999. Subsequently, Manić spent the following four seasons with Busan I'Cons (the club was renamed in 2000), before returning to his homeland and joining his parent club Radnički Pirot in early 2003.

In 2004, Manić returned to South Korea and signed with Incheon United. He spent two seasons at the club, before again joining Radnički Pirot in early 2006. Before retiring, Manić also spent half a season with Sevojno and Mladenovac.

== International career ==
In June 1997, Manić earned his only cap for FR Yugoslavia in a 1–1 friendly draw against South Korea at the Seoul Olympic Stadium.

== Managerial career ==
After a successful stint at Car Konstantin, Manić was appointed manager of his former club Radnički Pirot in November 2011. He resigned in March 2012. Manić was also manager of Balkanski, before leaving in May 2013.

== Honours ==
Pusan Daewoo Royals

- K League: 1997
