= 1986 K League =

Football Festival
- Season: 1986
- Dates: First stage: 2 March – 20 April 1986; Second stage: 11 October – 16 November 1986; Championship: 22–23 November 1986
- Champions: POSCO Atoms (1st title)
- Asian Club Championship: Withdrew
- Matches played: 60
- Goals scored: 140 (2.33 per match)
- Best Player: Lee Heung-sil
- Top goalscorer: Chung Hae-won (10 goals)
- Best goalkeeper: Kim Hyun-tae

The 1986 Korean Football Festival was the fourth season of the top football league in South Korea. Six teams participated in this season. Five of them were professional teams (Yukong Elephants, Daewoo Royals, POSCO Atoms, Lucky-Goldstar Hwangso and Hyundai Horang-i) and one was a semi-professional team (Hanil Bank). Hallelujah FC, the first South Korean first professional football club, changed its status to a semi-professional club and withdrew from the league afterwards. Sangmu FC, run by the Army also withdrew, leaving Hanil Bank as the only semi-professional team in the league.

It began on 2 March and ended on 16 November. It consisted of two stages and winners of each stage qualify for the championship playoffs. Between the two stages, the Korean Professional Football Championship in which only professional teams participated was held from May to September.

== Foreign players ==
Team	Player 1
Daewoo Royals	
Hanil Bank	
Hyundai Horang-i	
Lucky-Goldstar Hwangso	(Thailand) Piyapong Pue-on
POSCO Atoms	(Brazil) Paulinho Criciúma
Yukong Elephants	

== Regular season ==
=== First stage ===
Pos	Team	Pld	W	D	L	GF	GA	GD	Pts	Qualification
1	POSCO Atoms	10	3	6	1	9	5	+4	12	Qualification for the playoffs
2	Lucky-Goldstar Hwangso	10	3	5	2	9	8	+1	11	
3	Yukong Elephants	10	4	2	4	11	10	+1	10	
4	Daewoo Royals	10	4	2	4	8	10	−2	10	
5	Hanil Bank	10	3	3	4	9	10	−1	9	
6	Hyundai Horang-i	10	2	4	4	6	9	−3	8	

Source: RSSSF

=== Second stage ===
Pos	Team	Pld	W	D	L	GF	GA	GD	Pts	Qualification
1	Lucky-Goldstar Hwangso	10	7	2	1	19	9	+10	16	Qualification for the playoffs
2	Hyundai Horang-i	10	5	4	1	16	8	+8	14	
3	Daewoo Royals	10	6	0	4	18	14	+4	12	
4	Yukong Elephants	10	3	3	4	18	16	+2	9	
5	POSCO Atoms	10	2	2	6	9	18	−9	6	
6	Hanil Bank	10	1	1	8	8	23	−15	3	

Source: RSSSF

== Championship playoffs ==
Team 1	Agg.	Team 2	1st leg	2nd leg
POSCO Atoms (C)	2–1	Lucky-Goldstar Hwangso	1–0	1–1

== Top scorers ==
Rank	Scorer	Club	Goals	Apps
1	(South Korea) Chung Hae-won	Daewoo Royals	10	19
2	(South Korea) Ham Hyun-gi	Hyundai Horang-i	8	20
3	(South Korea) Gu Bon-seok	Yukong Elephants	7	18
4	(South Korea) Kim Yong-se	Yukong Elephants	6	10
5	(South Korea) Cho Min-kuk	Lucky-Goldstar Hwangso	5	10
5	(South Korea) Lee Heung-sil	POSCO Atoms	5	17
5	(South Korea) Lee Sang-rae	Lucky-Goldstar Hwangso	5	19
5	(South Korea) Yoon Sung-hyo	Hanil Bank	5	20

== Awards ==
=== Main awards ===
Award	Winner	Club
Most Valuable Player	(South Korea) Lee Heung-sil	POSCO Atoms
Top goalscorer	(South Korea) Chung Hae-won	Daewoo Royals
Top assist provider	(South Korea) Kang Deuk-soo	Lucky-Goldstar Hwangso
Rookie of the Year	(South Korea) Ham Hyun-gi	Hyundai Horang-i
Manager of the Year	(South Korea) Choi Eun-taek	POSCO Atoms
Best Goalkeeper	(South Korea) Kim Hyun-tae	Lucky-Goldstar Hwangso
Fighting Spirit Award	(South Korea) Min Jin-hong	Yukong Elephants
Exemplary Award	(South Korea) Park Sung-hwa	POSCO Atoms
Best Referee	(South Korea) Shim Geon-taek	—
Special Award	(South Korea) Chung Hae-won	Daewoo Royals

=== Best XI ===
Position	Winner	Club
Goalkeeper	(South Korea) Kim Hyun-tae	Lucky-Goldstar Hwangso
Defenders	(South Korea) Cho Young-jeung	Lucky-Goldstar Hwangso
Defenders	(South Korea) Kim Pyung-seok	Hyundai Horang-i
Defenders	(South Korea) Choi Kang-hee	Hyundai Horang-i
Defenders	(South Korea) Park No-bong	Daewoo Royals
Midfielders	(South Korea) Cho Min-kook	Lucky-Goldstar Hwangso
Midfielders	(South Korea) Lee Heung-sil	POSCO Atoms
Midfielders	(South Korea) Yoon Sung-hyo	Hanil Bank
Forwards	(South Korea) Kim Yong-se	Yukong Elephants
Forwards	(South Korea) Chung Hae-won	Daewoo Royals
Forwards	(South Korea) Ham Hyun-gi	Hyundai Horang-i

== See also ==
- 1986 K League Championship
- Professional Football Championship (South Korea)
