= Choi Yong-soo =

South Korean footballer (born 1973)

Personal information
- Full name: Choi Yong-soo
- Date of birth: 10 September 1973 (age 53)
- Place of birth: Busan, South Korea
- Height: 1.84 m (6 ft 1/2 in)
- Position: Striker

College career
Years	Team	Apps	(Gls)
1990–1993	Yonsei University		

Senior career*
Years	Team	Apps	(Gls)
1994–2000	Anyang LG Cheetahs	111	(44)
1997–1998	→ Sangmu FC (draft)		
2001–2004	JEF United Ichihara	73	(54)
2004	→ Kyoto Purple Sanga (loan)	33	(20)
2005	Júbilo Iwata	15	(1)
2006	FC Seoul	2	(0)
Total		234	(119)

International career
1992–1993	South Korea U20	9	(4)
1994–1996	South Korea U23	31	(18)
1995–2003	South Korea	69	(27)

Managerial career
- 2011: FC Seoul (caretaker)
- 2012–2016: FC Seoul
- 2016–2017: Jiangsu Suning
- 2018–2020: FC Seoul
- 2021–2023: Gangwon FC
Medal record
Representing South Korea
Men's football
AFC Youth Championship
Runner-up	1992 United Arab Emirates
EAFF Championship
Winner	2003 Japan
- * Club domestic league appearances and goals

- Choi Yong-soo
- Hangul: 최용수
- Hanja: 崔龍洙
- RR: Choe Yongsu
- MR: Ch'oe Yongsu

Choi Yong-soo (Korean: 최용수; born 10 September 1973) is a South Korean professional football manager and former player. He competed for South Korea at the 1996 Summer Olympics.

== Playing career ==
Choi played as a striker for Anyang LG Cheetahs (currently FC Seoul) in South Korea's K League. In 2000, he led Anyang to the K League title, receiving the K League MVP Award. He is considered one of the FC Seoul's legends.

Choi also played for the South Korean national team in 1998 and 2002 FIFA World Cup.

== Managerial career ==
Choi was appointed as the assistant coach of FC Seoul in August 2006, and was promoted as the caretaker manager in April 2011. He was finally named a permanent coach after leading Seoul as a caretaker manager during the 2011 season. He led his team to the 2012 K League title and the 2013 AFC Champions League Final. They drew all two matches of the Champions League final against Guangzhou Evergrande, a Chinese club led by Marcello Lippi, but couldn't get the title due to the away goals rule. Nevertheless, Choi was named the AFC Coach of the Year.

On 21 June 2016, he was officially appointed as the manager of a Chinese club Jiangsu Suning. He finished as runner-up in the Chinese Super League and the Chinese FA Cup. On 1 June 2017, he officially resigned from Jiangsu Suning.

On 11 October 2018, Choi was officially reappointed as the manager of FC Seoul, which was being threatened with relegation. On 9 December 2018, Choi won the relegation playoffs against Busan IPark, successfully keeping Seoul in the K League. On 30 July 2020, he resigned from Seoul due to his poor results in the 2020 season.

On 17 November 2021, Choi started to manage Gangwon FC. On 14 June 2023, Choi was replaced by Yoon Jong-hwan at Gangwon FC.

== Personal life ==
Choi divorced his wife in November 2006 after a 15-month-long marriage. His former wife, a one-time contestant in a Miss Korea pageant, went through the legal procedures to take half the estate properties under Choi's name per their prenuptial agreement.

In Australia and Pakistan, Choi is known as "Younis Choi", given to him in recognition of his low, swerving shots on goal – much like the signature delivery bowled by Pakistani cricketer Waqar Younis.

== Career statistics ==
=== Club ===
Appearances and goals by club, season and competition
Club	Season	League			National cup		League cup		Continental		Total	
Club	Season	Division	Apps	Goals	Apps	Goals	Apps	Goals	Apps	Goals	Apps	Goals
Anyang LG Cheetahs	1994	K League	29	9	—		6	1	—		35	10
Anyang LG Cheetahs	1995	K League	21	9	—		7	2	—		28	11
Anyang LG Cheetahs	1996	K League	16	4	1	0	6	1	—		23	5
Anyang LG Cheetahs	1999	K League	20	12	3	5	7	2	—		30	19
Anyang LG Cheetahs	2000	K League	25	10	?	?	9	4	2	1	36	15
Anyang LG Cheetahs	Total		111	44	4	5	35	10	2	1	152	60
Sangmu FC (draft)	1997	National Semipro League	?	?	?	?	—		—		?	?
Sangmu FC (draft)	1998	National Semipro League	?	?	?	?	—		—		?	?
Sangmu FC (draft)	Total		?	?	?	?	—		—		?	?
JEF United Ichihara	2001	J1 League	26	21	3	4	5	2	—		34	27
JEF United Ichihara	2002	J1 League	23	16	4	3	1	0	—		28	19
JEF United Ichihara	2003	J1 League	24	17	0	0	2	0	—		26	17
JEF United Ichihara	Total		73	54	7	7	8	2	—		88	63
Kyoto Purple Sanga (loan)	2004	J2 League	33	20	1	0	—		—		34	20
Júbilo Iwata	2005	J1 League	15	1	0	0	1	0	4	2	20	3
FC Seoul	2006	K League	2	0	0	0	0	0	—		2	0
Career total			234	119	12	12	44	12	6	3	296	146

=== International ===
Appearances and goals by national team and year
National team	Year	Apps	Goals
South Korea	1995	5	1
South Korea	1997	15	11
South Korea	1998	24	13
South Korea	2000	5	0
South Korea	2001	6	2
South Korea	2002	8	0
South Korea	2003	6	0
Career total		69	27

Results list South Korea's goal tally first.

List of international goals scored by Choi Yong-soo
No.	Date	Venue	Cap	Opponent	Score	Result	Competition
1	31 January 1995	Hong Kong	1	Colombia	1–0	1–0	1995 Lunar New Year Cup
2	28 May 1997	Daejeon, South Korea	7	Hong Kong	2–0	4–0	1998 FIFA World Cup qualification
3	28 May 1997	Daejeon, South Korea	7	Hong Kong	3–0	4–0	1998 FIFA World Cup qualification
4	14 June 1997	Suwon, South Korea	9	Ghana	2–0	3–0	1997 Korea Cup
5	24 August 1997	Daegu, South Korea	12	Tajikistan	2–0	4–1	Friendly
6	6 September 1997	Seoul, South Korea	14	Kazakhstan	1–0	3–0	1998 FIFA World Cup qualification
7	6 September 1997	Seoul, South Korea	14	Kazakhstan	2–0	3–0	1998 FIFA World Cup qualification
8	6 September 1997	Seoul, South Korea	14	Kazakhstan	3–0	3–0	1998 FIFA World Cup qualification
9	12 September 1997	Seoul, South Korea	15	Uzbekistan	1–0	2–1	1998 FIFA World Cup qualification
10	11 October 1997	Almaty, Kazakhstan	18	Kazakhstan	1–0	1–1	1998 FIFA World Cup qualification
11	18 October 1997	Tashkent, Uzbekistan	19	Uzbekistan	1–0	5–1	1998 FIFA World Cup qualification
12	18 October 1997	Tashkent, Uzbekistan	19	Uzbekistan	3–0	5–1	1998 FIFA World Cup qualification
13	27 January 1998	Bangkok, Thailand	21	Egypt	1–0	2–0	1998 King's Cup
14	29 January 1998	Bangkok, Thailand	22	Thailand	2–0	2–0	1998 King's Cup
15	31 January 1998	Bangkok, Thailand	23	Egypt	1–1	1–1 (a.e.t.) (5–4 p)	1998 King's Cup
16	7 February 1998	Auckland, New Zealand	24	New Zealand	1–0	1–0	Friendly
17	18 April 1998	Skopje, Macedonia	30	Macedonia	2–1	2–2	Friendly
18	27 May 1998	Seoul, South Korea	34	Czech Republic	2–2	2–2	Friendly
19	2 December 1998	Bangkok, Thailand	39	Turkmenistan	1–0	2–3	1998 Asian Games
20	2 December 1998	Bangkok, Thailand	39	Turkmenistan	2–0	2–3	1998 Asian Games
21	4 December 1998	Bangkok, Thailand	40	Vietnam	2–0	4–0	1998 Asian Games
22	4 December 1998	Bangkok, Thailand	40	Vietnam	4–0	4–0	1998 Asian Games
23	7 December 1998	Bangkok, Thailand	41	Japan	1–0	2–0	1998 Asian Games
24	7 December 1998	Bangkok, Thailand	41	Japan	2–0	2–0	1998 Asian Games
25	11 December 1998	Bangkok, Thailand	43	Kuwait	1–0	1–0	1998 Asian Games
26	13 September 2001	Daejeon, South Korea	54	Nigeria	2–2	2–2	Friendly
27	13 November 2001	Gwangju, South Korea	55	Croatia	1–0	1–1	Friendly

== Managerial statistics ==
As of 14 June 2023

Managerial record by team and tenure
Team	From	To	Record					Ref.
Team	From	To	Pld	W	D	L	Win %	Ref.
FC Seoul	26 April 2011	22 June 2016	266	138	70	58	51.88	
Jiangsu Suning	1 July 2016	1 June 2017	42	19	8	15	45.24	
FC Seoul	18 October 2018	30 July 2020	63	22	15	26	34.92	
Gangwon FC	17 November 2021	14 June 2023	63	21	14	28	33.33	
Career total			434	200	107	127	46.08	

== Honours ==
=== Player ===
FC Seoul

- K League 1: 2000
- Korean League Cup: 2006

Sangmu FC

- Korean National Semipro League (Autumn): 1997, 1998

South Korea U20

- AFC Youth Championship runner-up: 1992

South Korea

- EAFF Championship: 2003

Individual

- K League Rookie of the Year: 1994
- AFC Asian All-Star: 1997
- K League All-Star: 1998, 1999, 2000
- Korean National Semipro League (Autumn) top goalscorer: 1998
- Korean FA Cup top goalscorer: 1999
- K League 1 Most Valuable Player: 2000
- K League 1 Best XI: 2000
- J.League All-Star: 2001, 2003

=== Manager ===
FC Seoul

- K League 1: 2012
- Korean FA Cup: 2015
- AFC Champions League runner-up: 2013

Jiangsu Suning

- Chinese FA Cup runner-up: 2016

Individual

- K League 1 Manager of the Year: 2012
- K League All-Star: 2013
- AFC Coach of the Year: 2013
- K League Manager of the Month: September 2014, March/April 2016, March 2019
- Korean FA Cup Best Manager: 2015

== Notes ==
Sporting positions
Preceded by Kang Chun-ho	Anyang LG Cheetahs captain 1999–2000	Succeeded by Kim Gwi-hwa
