= Leandro Machado (footballer, born 1976) =

Brazilian footballer

Personal information
- Full name: Leandro Machado Nascimento
- Date of birth: 22 March 1976 (age 50)
- Place of birth: Santo Amaro, Brazil
- Height: 1.85 m (6 ft 1 in)
- Position: Forward

Youth career
- 1993–1994: Avaí

Senior career*
Years	Team	Apps	(Gls)
1994–1996	Internacional	51	(22)
1996–1997	Valencia	23	(8)
1997–1999	Sporting CP	35	(12)
1998–1999	→ Tenerife (loan)	3	(0)
1999–2002	Flamengo	69	(28)
2001	→ Internacional (loan)	9	(3)
2002	Dynamo Kyiv	5	(2)
2002	→ Dynamo-2 Kyiv	4	(1)
2003	Santa Clara	3	(0)
2004	Querétaro	9	(1)
2004	Santos	4	(0)
2005	Olimpia	?	(9)
2005–2007	Ulsan Hyundai	52	(16)
2008	Sport	9	(2)
Total		276	(104)

International career
1996	Brazil	2	(1)
- * Club domestic league appearances and goals

Leandro Machado Nascimento (born 22 March 1976) is a Brazilian former professional footballer who played as a forward.

Other than in his own country, he competed professionally in Spain, Portugal, Ukraine, Mexico, Paraguay and South Korea.

Machado was part of the Brazilian squad at the 1996 Gold Cup.

== Club career ==
Born in Santo Amaro da Imperatriz, Santa Catarina, Machado was just 18 when he made his Série A debut with Sport Club Internacional. After three seasons the 20-year-old moved abroad, signing with Spanish club Valencia CF for 700 million pesetas and first appearing in La Liga on 23 December 1996 when he came on as a second-half substitute for Goran Vlaović in a 3–0 home win over Hércules CF; during his only season he notably scored once against Atlético Madrid (4–1 away success) and twice against Athletic Bilbao (5–2, home), and his team eventually finished in tenth position.

Machado netted ten times for Sporting Clube de Portugal in 1997–98, and the side ranked fourth in the Primeira Liga. On 30 November 1998 he returned to the Spanish top division, appearing rarely for CD Tenerife in a relegation-ending campaign.

Subsequently, safe for three years at Clube de Regatas do Flamengo, Machado rarely settled with a team, playing with Internacional, FC Dynamo Kyiv, C.D. Santa Clara, Querétaro FC, Santos FC and Club Olimpia. He revived his career in South Korea with Ulsan Hyundai FC, scoring a career-best 13 goals in his first year and winning both the K League and the top scorer award in the process.

Machado retired at the age of 32 after a spell with Sport Club do Recife, due to knee problems.

== International career ==
Machado earned the first of his two caps for Brazil during the 1996 CONCACAF Gold Cup, needing only 11 minutes after replacing Sávio to score the final 4–1 in a group stage contest against Canada.

== Career statistics ==
(Brazil score listed first, score column indicates score after each Machado goal)

Date	Venue	Opponent	Score	Result	Competition
12 January 1996	Memorial Coliseum, Los Angeles, United States	Canada	4–1	4–1	1996 CONCACAF Gold Cup

== Honours ==
Internacional

- Campeonato Gaúcho: 1994

Flamengo

- Campeonato Carioca: 1999, 2000, 2001
- Copa Mercosur: 1999
- Taça Guanabara: 1999
- Taça Rio: 2000

Santos

- Campeonato Brasileiro Série A: 2004

Sport Recife

- Copa do Brasil: 2008
- Campeonato Pernambucano: 2008

Dynamo Kyiv

- Ukrainian Premier League: 2002–03

Ulsan Hyundai

- K League: 2005

Brazil

- Toulon Tournament: 1995

Individual

- K League: Top Scorer 2005
