= André (footballer, born 1972) =

Brazilian footballer

André Gaspar
Personal information
- Full name: André Luíz Alves Santos
- Date of birth: 16 November 1972 (age 53)
- Place of birth: Santos, Brazil
- Height: 1.72 m (5 ft 8 in)
- Position: Midfielder

Senior career*
Years	Team	Apps	(Gls)
1992–1995	Santos		
1996–1998	Portuguesa Santista		
1998–1999	Marília		
2000–2002	Anyang LG Cheetahs	71	(11)
2003–2004	Qingdao Jonoon		
2005–2008	Bragantino		

Managerial career
- 2008–2014: Bragantino (caretaker)
- 2014: Bragantino
- 2015–2017: Daegu (assistant)
- 2017: Daegu (caretaker)
- 2018–2020: Daegu
- 2020–2022: Al-Hazem
- 2022–2023: Borneo Samarinda
- 2024: Guangxi Pingguo Haliao
- 2024-: Rio Claro
- * Club domestic league appearances and goals

André Luíz Alves Santos (born 16 November 1972), also known as André Gaspar, is a Brazilian football manager and former player. He was winner of K League Top Assists Award and played for the title-winning club during the 2000 season.

== Career ==
André played for Seoul of the South Korean K League 1, then known as Anyang LG Cheetahs.

== Honours ==
=== Player ===
Anyang LG Cheetahs

- K League 1: 2000; runner-up 2001
- Super Cup: 2001
- Asian Club Championship runner-up: 2001-02

=== Manager ===
Daegu

- Korean FA Cup: 2018

=== Individual ===
Anyang LG Cheetahs

- K League Top Assistor Award: 2000
- K League Best XI: 2000, 2002

Daegu

- Korean FA Cup Manager Award: 2018
