= 1996 K League Championship =

- Event: 1996 K League
Ulsan Hyundai Horang-i	Suwon Samsung Bluewings
3	2
- on aggregate

First leg
Ulsan Hyundai Horang-i	Suwon Samsung Bluewings
0	1
- Date: 9 November 1996
- Venue: Ulsan Stadium, Ulsan

Second leg
Suwon Samsung Bluewings	Ulsan Hyundai Horang-i
1	3
- Date: 16 November 1996
- Venue: Suwon Sports Complex, Suwon

The 1996 K League Championship was the fourth competition of the K League Championship, and was held to decide the 14th champions of the K League. It was contested between winners of two stages of the regular season, and was played over two legs.

== Qualified teams ==
Club	Placement
Ulsan Hyundai Horang-i	First stage winners
Suwon Samsung Bluewings	Second stage winners

== First leg ==
9 November 1996

Ulsan Hyundai Horang-i	0–1	Suwon Samsung Bluewings
		Cho Hyun-doo 21'

Ulsan Stadium, Ulsan

== Second leg ==
The second leg of the 1996 K League Championship is regarded as one of the most violent matches in history of the K League. During the match, the referee took out the yellow card 14 times, and a total of five players were sent off.

16 November 1996

Suwon Samsung Bluewings	1–3	Ulsan Hyundai Horang-i
Lee Kee-keun 47'	Highlights	Kim Hyun-seok 31'; Yoo Sang-chul 61'; Hwang Seung-ju 80'

Suwon Sports Complex, Suwon

== Final table ==
Pos	Team	Qualification
1	Ulsan Hyundai Horang-i (C)	Qualification for the Asian Club Championship
2	Suwon Samsung Bluewings	Qualification for the Cup Winners' Cup (Note: The champions of the 1996 Korean FA Cup Pohang Atoms qualified for the Asian Club Championship, so the runners-up of the FA Cup Suwon Samsung Bluewings qualified for the Asian Cup Winners' Cup instead of champions.)

Source: RSSSF
(C) Champions

== See also ==
- 1996 K League
