= 2008 K League Championship =

Tournament details
- Host country: South Korea
- Dates: 22 November – 7 December 2008
- Teams: 6

Final positions
- Champions: Suwon Samsung Bluewings
- Runners-up: FC Seoul

Tournament statistics
- Matches played: 6
- Goals scored: 15 (2.5 per match)
- Attendance: 108,901 (18,150 per match)
- Top scorer(s): Yeom Ki-hun; Jung Jo-gook (2 goals each)

The 2008 K League Championship was the twelfth competition of the K League Championship, and was held to decide the 26th champions of the K League. The top six clubs of the regular season qualified for the championship. The winners of the regular season directly qualified for the final, and second place team qualified for the semi-final. The other four clubs entered the first round, and the winners of the second round advanced to the semi-final. Each match was played as a single match, excluding the final which consisted of two matches. Suwon Samsung Bluewings became the champions by defeating FC Seoul 3–2 on aggregate in the final.

== Qualified teams ==
Pos	Team	Pld	W	D	L	GF	GA	GD	Pts	Qualification
1	Suwon Samsung Bluewings	26	17	3	6	46	24	+22	54	Qualification for the playoffs final
2	FC Seoul	26	15	9	2	44	25	+19	54	Qualification for the playoffs semi-final
3	Seongnam Ilhwa Chunma	26	15	6	5	45	21	+24	51	Qualification for the playoffs first round
4	Ulsan Hyundai	26	14	7	5	39	26	+13	49	Qualification for the playoffs first round
5	Pohang Steelers	26	13	5	8	43	34	+9	44	Qualification for the playoffs first round
6	Jeonbuk Hyundai Motors	26	11	4	11	39	37	+2	37	Qualification for the playoffs first round

Source: RSSSF (in English), K League (in Korean)
Rules for classification: 1) Points; 2) Goal difference; 3) Goals scored

== Bracket ==
First round
3	Seongnam Ilhwa Chunma	1
6	Jeonbuk Hyundai Motors (a.e.t.)	2
4	Ulsan Hyundai (p)	0 (4)
5	Pohang Steelers	0 (2)

Second round
Ulsan Hyundai	1
Jeonbuk Hyundai Motors	0

Semifinal
2	FC Seoul (a.e.t.)	4
Ulsan Hyundai	2

Final
1	Suwon Samsung Bluewings	1	2	3
FC Seoul	1	1	2

== First round ==
22 November 2008

Ulsan Hyundai	0–0 (a.e.t.)	Pohang Steelers
	Report
Penalties
	4–2

Ulsan Munsu Football Stadium, Ulsan
Attendance: 9,480

23 November 2008

Seongnam Ilhwa Chunma	1–2 (a.e.t.)	Jeonbuk Hyundai Motors
Dudu 29'	Report	Choi Tae-uk 75'; Luiz Henrique 99'

Tancheon Stadium, Seongnam
Attendance: 9,752

== Second round ==
26 November 2008

Ulsan Hyundai	1–0	Jeonbuk Hyundai Motors
Yeom Ki-hun 40'	Report

Ulsan Munsu Football Stadium, Ulsan
Attendance: 13,753

== Semi-final ==
30 November 2008

FC Seoul	4–2 (a.e.t.)	Ulsan Hyundai
Jung Jo-gook 26'; Damjanović 97'; Kim Eun-jung 109'; Kim Seung-yong 115'	Report	Yeom Ki-hun 79'; Luizinho 114'

Seoul World Cup Stadium, Seoul
Attendance: 25,959

== Final ==
=== First leg ===
3 December 2008
20:00 KST

FC Seoul	1–1	Suwon Samsung Bluewings
Adilson 21'	Report	Kwak Hee-ju 79'

Seoul World Cup Stadium, Seoul
Attendance: 39,011
Referee: Peter Gagelmann (Germany)

FC Seoul	Suwon Samsung Bluewings

GK	24	(South Korea) Kim Ho-jun
RB	21	(South Korea) Choi Won-kwon
CB	20	(South Korea) Kim Jin-kyu
CB	22	(South Korea) Kim Chi-gon (c)
LB	8	(Brazil) Adilson	(substituted off) 77'
RM	27	(South Korea) Lee Chung-yong
CM	14	(South Korea) Kim Han-yoon	(substituted off) 81'
CM	17	(South Korea) Ki Sung-yueng
LM	26	(South Korea) Kim Chi-woo
FW	9	(South Korea) Jung Jo-gook
FW	11	(Montenegro) Dejan Damjanović	(substituted off) 63'
Substitutes:
GK	30	(South Korea) Jo Su-huk
DF	4	(South Korea) Park Yong-ho	(substituted on) 77'
MF	7	(South Korea) Lee Eul-yong	(substituted on) 63'
MF	47	(South Korea) Kim Seung-yong
FW	18	(South Korea) Kim Eun-jung
FW	19	(South Korea) Lee Sang-hyup	(substituted on) 81'
Manager:
(Turkey) Şenol Güneş

GK	1	(South Korea) Lee Woon-jae
DF	29	(South Korea) Kwak Hee-ju
DF	2	(Croatia) Mato Neretljak
DF	14	(South Korea) Lee Jung-soo
DF	8	(South Korea) Song Chong-gug
MF	6	(South Korea) Cho Won-hee
MF	15	(South Korea) Hong Soon-hak	(substituted off) 69'
MF	11	(South Korea) Kim Dae-eui
MF	20	(South Korea) Baek Ji-hoon	(substituted off) ?'
FW	18	(South Korea) Shin Young-rok	(substituted off) 54'
FW	9	(Brazil) Edu
Substitutes:
GK	21	(South Korea) Kim Dae-hwan
DF	3	(South Korea) Yang Sang-min
DF	25	(South Korea) Choi Sung-hwan
MF	30	(South Korea) Choi Sung-hyun	(substituted on) 69'
MF	13	(South Korea) Lee Kwan-woo	(substituted on) 54'
MF	16	(South Korea) Bae Ki-jong	(substituted on) ?'
Manager:
(South Korea) Cha Bum-kun

Assistant referees:
Kim Yong-soo (South Korea)
Jung Hae-sang (South Korea)
Fourth official:
Choi Kwang-bo (South Korea)

=== Second leg ===
7 December 2008
14:00 KST

Suwon Samsung Bluewings	2–1	FC Seoul
Edu 11'; Song Chong-gug 36'	Report	Jung Jo-gook 25' (pen.)

Suwon World Cup Stadium, Suwon
Attendance: 10,946
Referee: Felix Brych (Germany)

Suwon Samsung Bluewings	FC Seoul

GK	1	(South Korea) Lee Woon-jae
DF	29	(South Korea) Kwak Hee-ju
DF	2	(Croatia) Mato Neretljak
DF	14	(South Korea) Lee Jung-soo
DF	8	(South Korea) Song Chong-gug
MF	6	(South Korea) Cho Won-hee
MF	15	(South Korea) Hong Soon-hak	(substituted off) 76'
MF	11	(South Korea) Kim Dae-eui	(substituted off) 81'
MF	16	(South Korea) Bae Ki-jong	(substituted off) 60'
FW	27	(South Korea) Seo Dong-hyeon
FW	9	(Brazil) Edu
Substitutes:
GK	21	(South Korea) Kim Dae-hwan
DF	25	(South Korea) Choi Sung-hwan
DF	19	(South Korea) Namgoong Woong	(substituted on) 76'
MF	20	(South Korea) Baek Ji-hoon	(substituted on) 81'
MF	13	(South Korea) Lee Kwan-woo
FW	18	(South Korea) Shin Young-rok	(substituted on) 60'
Manager:
(South Korea) Cha Bum-kun

GK	24	(South Korea) Kim Ho-jun
RB	21	(South Korea) Choi Won-kwon
CB	20	(South Korea) Kim Jin-kyu	(yellow card) 35'
CB	22	(South Korea) Kim Chi-gon (c)
LB	8	(Brazil) Adilson	(yellow card) 80'
RM	27	(South Korea) Lee Chung-yong
CM	14	(South Korea) Kim Han-yoon		(substituted off) 76'
CM	17	(South Korea) Ki Sung-yueng	(yellow card) 93'
LM	26	(South Korea) Kim Chi-woo		(substituted off) 81'
FW	9	(South Korea) Jung Jo-gook		(substituted off) 67'
FW	11	(Montenegro) Dejan Damjanović
Substitutes:
GK	30	(South Korea) Jo Su-huk
DF	4	(South Korea) Park Yong-ho
MF	7	(South Korea) Lee Eul-yong
MF	38	(South Korea) Han Tae-you		(substituted on) 81'
FW	18	(South Korea) Kim Eun-jung		(substituted on) 67'
FW	19	(South Korea) Lee Sang-hyup		(substituted on) 76'
Manager:
(Turkey) Şenol Güneş

Assistant referees:
Kim Kye-soo (South Korea)
Kim Jung-sik (South Korea)
Fourth official:
Lee Sang-yong (South Korea)

Suwon Samsung Bluewings won 3–2 on aggregate.

== Final table ==
Pos	Team	Qualification
1	Suwon Samsung Bluewings (C)	Qualification for the Champions League
2	FC Seoul	Qualification for the Champions League
3	Ulsan Hyundai	Qualification for the Champions League
4	Jeonbuk Hyundai Motors	
5	Seongnam Ilhwa Chunma	
6	Pohang Steelers	Qualification for the Champions League (Note: Qualified as champions of the FA Cup.)

Source: RSSSF
(C) Champions

== See also ==
- 2008 in South Korean football
- 2008 K League
