= 2005 K League =

Samsung Hauzen K League
- Season: 2005
- Dates: Regular season: 15 May – 9 November 2005; Championship: 20 November – 4 December 2005
- Champions: Ulsan Hyundai Horang-i (2nd title)
- Champions League: Ulsan Hyundai Horang-i; Jeonbuk Hyundai Motors
- Matches played: 156
- Goals scored: 373 (2.39 per match)
- Best Player: Lee Chun-soo
- Top goalscorer: Leandro Machado (13 goals)

The 2005 K League was the 23rd season of the K League, South Korea's professional football league, from 15 May to 4 December. The format of the regular season and championship playoffs was the same as the one used in the 2004 season.

Busan IPark won the first stage, and the second stage was won by Seongnam Ilhwa Chunma. Two winners were guaranteed their slot in the end-of-season playoffs. Incheon United and Ulsan Hyundai Horang-i also joined the playoffs according to the overall table after two stages. In the semi-finals Ulsan defeated Seongnam 2–1, and Incheon defeated Busan 2–0. The two victorious teams faced each other in the two-legged championship final. Ulsan won the first leg 5–1 at the Incheon stadium, and though Incheon won the second leg 2–1, Ulsan lifted their second league title 6–3 on aggregate.

== Foreign players ==
Club	Player 1	Player 2	Player 3	Player 4	Former players
Bucheon SK	(Brazil) Agostinho	(Brazil) Irineu	(Brazil) Sérgio Júnior	-	-
Busan IPark	(Brazil) Luciano Valente	(Brazil) Popó	(Cameroon) Felix Nzeina	-	(Brazil) Da Silva
Chunnam Dragons	(Brazil) Fabio Pereira	(Brazil) Ricardo Villar	(Brazil) Adrian Mihalcea	(Romania) Adrian Neaga	(Brazil) Fábio Júnior (Romania) Marian Aliuță
Daegu	(Brazil) Índio	(Brazil) Sandro Hiroshi	(Brazil) Thiago Gentil	-	(Brazil) Santiago
Daejeon Citizen	(Brazil) Alison	(Brazil) Leandrão	(Brazil) Luciano Ratinho	(Brazil) Henrique Dias	-
FC Seoul	(Brazil) Da Silva	(Portugal) Nonato	(Portugal) Pedro Franco	(Portugal) Ricardo Nascimento	-
Gwangju Sangmu Bulsajo	-	-	-	-	-
Incheon United	(Brazil) Selmir	(Croatia) Jasmin Agić	(Serbia and Montenegro) Dženan Radončić	(Slovenia) Sebastjan Cimirotič	(Serbia and Montenegro) Radivoje Manić
Jeonbuk Hyundai Motors	(Brazil) Edmilson	(Brazil) Neto Baiano	(Brazil) Raphael Botti	(Colombia) Milton Rodríguez	(Brazil) Marco Antônio (Brazil) Paulo César
Pohang Steelers	(Brazil) Andrezinho	(Brazil) Da Silva	(Brazil) Rogério Pinheiro	(Brazil) Wellington Amorim	(Brazil) André Gomes (Brazil) Itamar
Seongnam Ilhwa Chunma	(Brazil) Dudu	(Brazil) Fabrício	(Brazil) Mota	(Brazil) Ricardo	(Brazil) Jefferson Feijão
Suwon Samsung Bluewings	(Brazil) Itamar	(Brazil) Nádson	(Brazil) Sandro	(Croatia) Mato Neretljak	(Argentina) Javier Musa
Ulsan Hyundai Horang-i	(Argentina) Javier Musa	(Brazil) Leandro Machado	-	-	(Brazil) Barbieri (Brazil) Reinaldo (Brazil) Zé Carlos

== Regular season ==
=== First stage ===
The first place team qualified for the championship playoffs.

Pos	Team	Pld	W	D	L	GF	GA	GD	Pts	Qualification
1	Busan IPark	12	7	4	1	17	10	+7	25	Qualification for the playoffs
2	Incheon United	12	7	3	2	20	13	+7	24	
3	Ulsan Hyundai Horang-i	12	7	1	4	16	13	+3	22	
4	Pohang Steelers	12	6	3	3	14	11	+3	21	
5	FC Seoul	12	5	4	3	22	19	+3	19	
6	Seongnam Ilhwa Chunma	12	4	4	4	18	15	+3	16	
7	Bucheon SK	12	4	4	4	10	10	0	16	
8	Daejeon Citizen	12	2	8	2	11	11	0	14	
9	Suwon Samsung Bluewings	12	3	5	4	18	19	−1	14	
10	Jeonnam Dragons	12	3	5	4	13	14	−1	14	
11	Jeonbuk Hyundai Motors	12	2	3	7	13	19	−6	9	
12	Daegu FC	12	2	3	7	14	25	−11	9	
13	Gwangju Sangmu Bulsajo	12	1	3	8	16	23	−7	6	

Source: RSSSF

=== Second stage ===
The first place team qualified for the championship playoffs.

Pos	Team	Pld	W	D	L	GF	GA	GD	Pts	Qualification
1	Seongnam Ilhwa Chunma	12	8	3	1	22	9	+13	27	Qualification for the playoffs
2	Bucheon SK	12	8	2	2	16	8	+8	26	
3	Daegu FC	12	6	3	3	15	11	+4	21	
4	Ulsan Hyundai Horang-i	12	6	3	3	15	11	+4	21	
5	Incheon United	12	6	3	3	16	13	+3	21	
6	Pohang Steelers	12	5	4	3	14	11	+3	19	
7	Daejeon Citizen	12	4	4	4	8	9	−1	16	
8	Suwon Samsung Bluewings	12	3	5	4	11	13	−2	14	
9	FC Seoul	12	3	4	5	15	13	+2	13	
10	Jeonnam Dragons	12	4	1	7	10	15	−5	13	
11	Gwangju Sangmu Bulsajo	12	3	2	7	7	15	−8	11	
12	Jeonbuk Hyundai Motors	12	2	3	7	11	22	−11	9	
13	Busan IPark	12	0	3	9	11	21	−10	3	

Source: RSSSF

=== Overall table ===
The top two teams in the overall table qualified for the championship playoffs.

Pos	Team	Pld	W	D	L	GF	GA	GD	Pts	Qualification
1	Incheon United	24	13	6	5	36	26	+10	45	Qualification for the playoffs
2	Seongnam Ilhwa Chunma	24	12	7	5	40	24	+16	43	Second stage winners
3	Ulsan Hyundai Horang-i	24	13	4	7	31	24	+7	43	Qualification for the playoffs
4	Bucheon SK	24	12	6	6	26	18	+8	42	
5	Pohang Steelers	24	11	7	6	28	22	+6	40	
6	FC Seoul	24	8	8	8	37	32	+5	32	
7	Daejeon Citizen	24	6	12	6	19	20	−1	30	
8	Daegu FC	24	8	6	10	29	36	−7	30	
9	Suwon Samsung Bluewings	24	6	10	8	29	32	−3	28	
10	Busan IPark	24	7	7	10	28	31	−3	28	First stage winners
11	Jeonnam Dragons	24	7	6	11	23	29	−6	27	
12	Jeonbuk Hyundai Motors	24	4	6	14	24	41	−17	18	Qualification for the Champions League (Note: Qualified as champions of the FA Cup.)
13	Gwangju Sangmu Bulsajo	24	4	5	15	23	38	−15	17	

Source: RSSSF

== Championship playoffs ==
=== Bracket ===
Semi-finals
Busan IPark	0
Incheon United	2
Seongnam Ilhwa Chunma	1
Ulsan Hyundai Horang-i	2

Final
Incheon United	1	2	3
Ulsan Hyundai Horang-i	5	1	6

=== Final table ===
Pos	Team	Qualification
1	Ulsan Hyundai Horang-i (C)	Qualification for the Champions League
2	Incheon United	
3	Seongnam Ilhwa Chunma	
4	Busan IPark	

Source: RSSSF
(C) Champions

== Top scorers ==
This list includes goals of the championship playoffs.

Rank	Player	Club	Goals	Apps
1	(Brazil) Leandro Machado	Ulsan Hyundai Horang-i	13	17
2	(South Korea) Park Chu-young	FC Seoul	12	19
3	(Brazil) Dudu	Seongnam Ilhwa Chunma	10	24
3	(Brazil) Sandro Hiroshi	Daegu FC	10	24
5	(South Korea) Kim Do-hoon	Seongnam Ilhwa Chunma	9	20
5	(Serbia and Montenegro) Dženan Radončić	Incheon United	9	22
5	(Brazil) Luciano Valente	Busan IPark	9	22
5	(Brazil) Da Silva	Pohang Steelers	9	24
9	(Brazil) Mota	Seongnam Ilhwa Chunma	7	9
9	(South Korea) Lee Chun-soo	Ulsan Hyundai Horang-i	7	14
9	(Romania) Adrian Neaga	Jeonnam Dragons	7	15
9	(Brazil) Leandrão	Daejeon Citizen	7	19
9	(South Korea) Nam Ki-il	Seongnam Ilhwa Chunma	7	20
9	(South Korea) Kim Eun-jung	FC Seoul	7	20
9	(Brazil) Selmir	Incheon United	7	25

== Awards ==
=== Main awards ===
Award	Winner	Club
Most Valuable Player	(South Korea) Lee Chun-soo	Ulsan Hyundai Horang-i
Top goalscorer	(Brazil) Leandro Machado	Ulsan Hyundai Horang-i
Top assist provider	(Portugal) Ricardo Nascimento	Daegu FC
Rookie of the Year	(South Korea) Park Chu-young	FC Seoul
Manager of the Year	(South Korea) Chang Woe-ryong	Incheon United

=== Best XI ===
Position	Winner	Club
Goalkeeper	(South Korea) Kim Byung-ji	Pohang Steelers
Defenders	(South Korea) Lim Joong-yong	Incheon United
Defenders	(South Korea) Yoo Kyoung-youl	Ulsan Hyundai Horang-i
Defenders	(South Korea) Cho Yong-hyung	Bucheon SK
Defenders	(South Korea) Kim Young-chul	Seongnam Ilhwa Chunma
Midfielders	(South Korea) Lee Chun-soo	Ulsan Hyundai Horang-i
Midfielders	(South Korea) Lee Ho	Ulsan Hyundai Horang-i
Midfielders	(South Korea) Kim Do-heon	Seongnam Ilhwa Chunma
Midfielders	(South Korea) Cho Won-hee	Suwon Samsung Bluewings
Forwards	(South Korea) Park Chu-young	FC Seoul
Forwards	(Brazil) Leandro Machado	Ulsan Hyundai Horang-i

== See also ==
- 2005 in South Korean football
- 2005 K League Championship
- 2005 Korean League Cup
- 2005 Korean FA Cup
