= 2000 K League =

Samsung Digital K League
- Season: 2000
- Dates: Regular season: 14 May – 11 October 2000; Championship: 1–15 November 2000
- Champions: Anyang LG Cheetahs (3rd title)
- Asian Club Championship: Anyang LG Cheetahs; Suwon Samsung Bluewings
- Cup Winners' Cup: Jeonbuk Hyundai Motors
- Matches played: 135
- Goals scored: 369 (2.73 per match)
- Best Player: Choi Yong-soo
- Top goalscorer: Kim Do-hoon (12 goals)

The 2000 K League was the 18th season of K League.

== Regular season ==
| Pos | Team | Pld | W | PW | L | GF | GA | GD | Pts | Qualification |
|---|---|---|---|---|---|---|---|---|---|---|
| 1 | Anyang LG Cheetahs | 27 | 17 | 2 | 8 | 46 | 25 | +21 | 53 | Qualification for the playoffs final |
| 2 | Seongnam Ilhwa Chunma | 27 | 12 | 6 | 9 | 43 | 33 | +10 | 42 | Qualification for the playoffs semi-final |
| 3 | Jeonbuk Hyundai Motors | 27 | 11 | 4 | 12 | 34 | 40 | −6 | 37 | Qualification for the playoffs first round |
| 4 | Bucheon SK | 27 | 10 | 6 | 11 | 45 | 35 | +10 | 36 | Qualification for the playoffs first round |
| 5 | Suwon Samsung Bluewings | 27 | 11 | 3 | 13 | 48 | 43 | +5 | 36 | Qualification for the Asian Club Championship (Note: Qualified as defending champions of the Asian Club Championship.) |
| 6 | Busan I'Cons | 27 | 9 | 2 | 16 | 42 | 42 | 0 | 29 | |
| 7 | Jeonnam Dragons | 27 | 8 | 4 | 15 | 28 | 35 | −7 | 28 | |
| 8 | Daejeon Citizen | 27 | 7 | 3 | 17 | 26 | 40 | −14 | 24 | |
| 9 | Pohang Steelers | 27 | 5 | 7 | 15 | 31 | 39 | −8 | 22 | |
| 10 | Ulsan Hyundai Horang-i | 27 | 6 | 2 | 19 | 26 | 37 | −11 | 20 | |

Source: RSSSF
Rules for classification: W) 3 points; WP) 1 point, no extra time

== Championship playoffs ==
=== Bracket ===
First round
3 | Jeonbuk Hyundai Motors | 1
4 | Bucheon SK (a.e.t.) | 2

Semi-final
2 | Seongnam Ilhwa Chunma | 1 | 3 | 4
1R | Bucheon SK (a.e.t.) | 3 | 2 | 5

Final
SF | Bucheon SK | 1 | 1 (2) | X | 0W
1 | Anyang LG Cheetahs | 4 | 1 (4) | X | 2W

=== Final table ===
| Pos | Team | Qualification |
|---|---|---|
| 1 | Anyang LG Cheetahs (C) | Qualification for the Asian Club Championship |
| 2 | Bucheon SK | |
| 3 | Seongnam Ilhwa Chunma | |
| 4 | Jeonbuk Hyundai Motors | Qualification for the Cup Winners' Cup |

Source: RSSSF
(C) Champions

== Awards ==
=== Main awards ===
| Award | Winner | Club |
|---|---|---|
| Most Valuable Player | (South Korea) Choi Yong-soo | Anyang LG Cheetahs |
| Top goalscorer | (South Korea) Kim Do-hoon | Jeonbuk Hyundai Motors |
| Top assist provider | (Brazil) André | Anyang LG Cheetahs |
| Rookie of the Year | (South Korea) Yang Hyun-jung | Jeonbuk Hyundai Motors |
| Manager of the Year | (South Korea) Cho Kwang-rae | Anyang LG Cheetahs |

=== Best XI ===
| Position | Winner | Club |
|---|---|---|
| Goalkeeper | (South Korea) Shin Eui-son | Anyang LG Cheetahs |
| Defenders | (South Korea) Kang Chul | Bucheon SK |
| Defenders | (South Korea) Lee Lim-saeng | Bucheon SK |
| Defenders | (South Korea) Kim Hyun-soo | Seongnam Ilhwa Chunma |
| Defenders | (Brazil) Maciel | Jeonnam Dragons |
| Midfielders | (Brazil) André | Anyang LG Cheetahs |
| Midfielders | (South Korea) Shin Tae-yong | Seongnam Ilhwa Chunma |
| Midfielders | (South Korea) Jeon Kyung-jun | Bucheon SK |
| Midfielders | (Russia) Denis Laktionov | Suwon Samsung Bluewings |
| Forwards | (South Korea) Choi Yong-soo | Anyang LG Cheetahs |
| Forwards | (South Korea) Kim Do-hoon | Jeonbuk Hyundai Motors |

== See also ==
- 2000 K League Championship
- 2000 Korean League Cup
- 2000 Korean League Cup (Supplementary Cup)
- 2000 Korean FA Cup
