= 1996 K League =

Rapido Cup Professional Football League
- Season: 1996
- Dates: Regular season: 11 May – 2 November 1996; Championship: 9–16 November 1996
- Champions: Ulsan Hyundai Horang-i (1st title)
- Asian Club Championship: Ulsan Hyundai Horang-i; Pohang Atoms
- Cup Winners' Cup: Suwon Samsung Bluewings
- Matches played: 144
- Goals scored: 448 (3.11 per match)
- Best Player: Kim Hyun-seok
- Top goalscorer: Shin Tae-yong (18 goals)

The 1996 Korean Professional Football League was the 14th season of K League since its establishment in 1983. South Korean government and the Korean Professional Football Federation introduced a decentralization policy to proliferate the popularity of football nationally in preparation for the 2002 FIFA World Cup, which they wanted to host, so some clubs located in the capital Seoul (LG Cheetahs, Ilhwa Chunma) moved to other cities according to the new policy in this season.

== Regular season ==
=== First stage ===
Pos	Team	Pld	W	D	L	GF	GA	GD	Pts	Qualification
1	Ulsan Hyundai Horang-i	16	11	3	2	32	17	+15	36	Qualification for the playoffs
2	Pohang Atoms	16	10	5	1	24	12	+12	35	Qualification for the Asian Club Championship (Note: Qualified as defending champions of the Asian Club Championship.)
3	Suwon Samsung Bluewings	16	9	3	4	28	18	+10	30	
4	Bucheon Yukong	16	5	5	6	28	29	−1	20	
5	Jeonbuk Dinos	16	5	4	7	21	25	−4	19	
6	Jeonnam Dragons	16	5	3	8	18	29	−11	18	
7	Busan Daewoo Royals	16	4	3	9	23	28	−5	15	
8	Anyang LG Cheetahs	16	4	3	9	21	28	−7	15	
9	Cheonan Ilhwa Chunma	16	2	5	9	17	26	−9	11	

Source: RSSSF

=== Second stage ===
Pos	Team	Pld	W	D	L	GF	GA	GD	Pts	Qualification
1	Suwon Samsung Bluewings	16	9	6	1	29	15	+14	33	Qualification for the playoffs
2	Bucheon Yukong	16	8	4	4	27	22	+5	28	
3	Pohang Atoms	16	7	5	4	30	26	+4	26	
4	Busan Daewoo Royals	16	5	6	5	22	23	−1	21	
5	Cheonan Ilhwa Chunma	16	6	3	7	35	37	−2	21	
6	Jeonnam Dragons	16	4	6	6	22	24	−2	18	
7	Jeonbuk Dinos	16	5	3	8	20	24	−4	18	
8	Anyang LG Cheetahs	16	4	5	7	23	28	−5	17	
9	Ulsan Hyundai Horang-i	16	5	0	11	28	37	−9	15	

Source: RSSSF

== Championship playoffs ==
=== Summary ===
Team 1	Agg.	Team 2	1st leg	2nd leg
Ulsan Hyundai Horang-i	3–2	Suwon Samsung Bluewings	0–1	3–1

=== Final table ===
Pos	Team	Qualification
1	Ulsan Hyundai Horang-i (C)	Qualification for the Asian Club Championship
2	Suwon Samsung Bluewings	Qualification for the Cup Winners' Cup (Note: The champions of the 1996 Korean FA Cup Pohang Atoms qualified for the Asian Club Championship, so the runners-up of the FA Cup Suwon Samsung Bluewings qualified for the Asian Cup Winners' Cup instead of champions.)

Source: RSSSF
(C) Champions

== Awards ==
=== Main awards ===
Award	Winner	Club
Most Valuable Player	(South Korea) Kim Hyun-seok	Ulsan Hyundai Horang-i
Top goalscorer	(South Korea) Shin Tae-yong	Cheonan Ilhwa Chunma
Top assist provider	(Federal Republic of Yugoslavia) Rade Bogdanović	Pohang Atoms
Rookie of the Year	(South Korea) Park Kun-ha	Suwon Samsung Bluewings
Manager of the Year	(South Korea) Ko Jae-wook	Ulsan Hyundai Horang-i

=== Best XI ===
Position	Winner	Club
Goalkeeper	(South Korea) Kim Byung-ji	Ulsan Hyundai Horang-i
Defenders	(South Korea) Yoon Sung-hyo	Suwon Samsung Bluewings
Defenders	(South Korea) Kim Joo-sung	Busan Daewoo Royals
Defenders	(South Korea) Huh Ki-tae	Bucheon SK
Midfielders	(South Korea) Shin Tae-yong	Cheonan Ilhwa Chunma
Midfielders	(Romania) Pavel Badea	Suwon Samsung Bluewings
Midfielders	(South Korea) Hong Myung-bo	Pohang Atoms
Midfielders	(South Korea) Ha Seok-ju	Busan Daewoo Royals
Midfielders	(South Korea) Kim Hyun-seok	Ulsan Hyundai Horang-i
Forwards	(Federal Republic of Yugoslavia) Rade Bogdanović	Pohang Atoms
Forwards	(Russia) Sergey Burdin	Bucheon SK

== See also ==
- 1996 K League Championship
- 1996 Korean League Cup
- 1996 Korean FA Cup
