= 1986 K League Championship =

- Event: 1986 K League
POSCO Atoms	Lucky-Goldstar Hwangso
2	1
- on aggregate

First leg
POSCO Atoms	Lucky-Goldstar Hwangso
1	0
- Date: 22 November 1986
- Venue: Dongdaemun Stadium, Seoul

Second leg
Lucky-Goldstar Hwangso	POSCO Atoms
1	1
- Date: 23 November 1986
- Venue: Dongdaemun Stadium, Seoul

The 1986 K League Championship was the second competition of the K League Championship, and was held to decide the fourth champions of the K League. It was contested between winners of two stages of the regular season, and was played over two legs.

== Qualified teams ==
Club	Placement
POSCO Atoms	First stage winners
Lucky-Goldstar Hwangso	Second stage winners

== First leg ==
22 November 1986

POSCO Atoms	1–0	Lucky-Goldstar Hwangso
Park Kyung-hoon 21'

Dongdaemun Stadium, Seoul

== Second leg ==
23 November 1986

Lucky-Goldstar Hwangso	1–1	POSCO Atoms
Lee Young-jin 80'		Paulinho Criciúma 20'

Dongdaemun Stadium, Seoul

== See also ==
- 1986 K League
