= K League Championship =

The K League Championship was the final competition (play-offs) of the K League season. The K League originally had play-offs after regular seasons, but the name of play-offs was officially decided in 2009. This competition was abolished in 2011.

All K League Championship records from 1984 to 1996 are not included in the current K League official statistics.

== Summary ==
Champions Runners-up

=== Final ===
The winners of two regular stages in four early editions qualified for the two-legged final.

No.	Season	First stage winners	Second stage winners
1	1984	Yukong Elephants	Daewoo Royals
2	1986	POSCO Atoms	Lucky-Goldstar Hwangso
3	1995	Ilhwa Chunma	Pohang Atoms
4	1996	Ulsan Hyundai Horang-i	Suwon Samsung Bluewings

=== Play-offs of the top four (1998–2000) ===
First round
Regular third-placed team
Regular fourth-placed team

Semi-final
Regular second-placed team
First round winners

Final
Semi-final winners
Regular first-placed team

The top four clubs of the regular league qualified for the championship from 1998 to 2000. The first round was played as a single match, and the semi-final was a two-legged tie. The final also consisted of two matches in 1998, but it changed to best-of-three the next year.

No.	Season	Regular first place	Regular second place	Regular third place	Regular fourth place
5	1998	Suwon Samsung Bluewings	Ulsan Hyundai Horang-i	Pohang Steelers	Jeonnam Dragons
6	1999	Suwon Samsung Bluewings	Bucheon SK	Jeonnam Dragons	Busan Daewoo Royals
7	2000	Anyang LG Cheetahs	Seongnam Ilhwa Chunma	Jeonbuk Hyundai Motors	Bucheon SK

=== Play-offs of the top four (2004–2006) ===
Semi-finals
First stage winners
Overall table winners
Second stage winners
Overall table runners-up

Final
Semi-final winners
Semi-final winners

When the regular league was split into two stages again from 2004 to 2006, the top two clubs in the overall table qualified for the championship in addition to two winners. Each semi-final was a single match, and the final comprised two matches.

No.	Season	First stage winners	Second stage winners	Top two of the rest	
8	2004	Pohang Steelers	Suwon Samsung Bluewings	Ulsan Hyundai Horang-i	Jeonnam Dragons
9	2005	Busan IPark	Seongnam Ilhwa Chunma	Incheon United	Ulsan Hyundai Horang-i
10	2006	Seongnam Ilhwa Chunma	Suwon Samsung Bluewings	Pohang Steelers	FC Seoul

=== Play-offs of the top six ===
First round
3	Regular third-placed team
6	Regular sixth-placed team
4	Regular fourth-placed team
5	Regular fifth-placed team

Second round
First round winners
First round winners

Semi-final
2	Regular second-placed team
Second round winners

Final
1	Regular first-placed team
Semi-final winners

The K League Championship increased participating clubs to six since 2007. The winners of regular league directly qualified for the final, and the second-placed team qualified for the semi-final. The other four clubs entered the first round, and the winners of the second round advanced to the semi-final. Each match was played as a single match, excluding the two-legged final.

No.	Season	Regular first place	Regular second place	Regular third place	Regular fourth place	Regular fifth place	Regular sixth place
11	2007	Seongnam Ilhwa Chunma	Suwon Samsung Bluewings	Ulsan Hyundai Horang-i	Gyeongnam FC	Pohang Steelers	Daejeon Citizen
12	2008	Suwon Samsung Bluewings	FC Seoul	Seongnam Ilhwa Chunma	Ulsan Hyundai	Pohang Steelers	Jeonbuk Hyundai Motors
13	2009	Jeonbuk Hyundai Motors	Pohang Steelers	FC Seoul	Seongnam Ilhwa Chunma	Incheon United	Jeonnam Dragons
14	2010	FC Seoul	Jeju United	Jeonbuk Hyundai Motors	Ulsan Hyundai	Seongnam Ilhwa Chunma	Gyeongnam FC
15	2011	Jeonbuk Hyundai Motors	Pohang Steelers	FC Seoul	Suwon Samsung Bluewings	Busan IPark	Ulsan Hyundai

== Finals ==
No.	Season	Champions	Agg.	Runners-up	1st leg	2nd leg	3rd leg
1	1984	Daewoo Royals	2–1	Yukong Elephants	1–0	1–1	—
2	1986	POSCO Atoms	2–1	Lucky-Goldstar Hwangso	1–0	1–1	—
3	1995	Ilhwa Chunma	5–4	Pohang Atoms	1–1	3–3	1–0 (a.e.t.)
4	1996	Ulsan Hyundai Horang-i	3–2	Suwon Samsung Bluewings	0–1	3–1	—
5	1998	Suwon Samsung Bluewings	1–0	Ulsan Hyundai Horang-i	1–0	0–0	—
6	1999	Suwon Samsung Bluewings	2–0 (Note: Number of wins, not aggregate score)	Busan Daewoo Royals	2–1	2–1 (a.e.t.)	Not held
7	2000	Anyang LG Cheetahs	2–0	Bucheon SK	4–1	1–1 (4–2 p)	Not held
8	2004	Suwon Samsung Bluewings	0–0 (4–3 p)	Pohang Steelers	0–0	0–0 (a.e.t.)	—
9	2005	Ulsan Hyundai Horang-i	6–3	Incheon United	5–1	1–2	—
10	2006	Seongnam Ilhwa Chunma	3–1	Suwon Samsung Bluewings	1–0	2–1	—
11	2007	Pohang Steelers	4–1	Seongnam Ilhwa Chunma	3–1	1–0	—
12	2008	Suwon Samsung Bluewings	3–2	FC Seoul	1–1	2–1	—
13	2009	Jeonbuk Hyundai Motors	3–1	Seongnam Ilhwa Chunma	0–0	3–1	—
14	2010	FC Seoul	4–3	Jeju United	2–2	2–1	—
15	2011	Jeonbuk Hyundai Motors	4–2	Ulsan Hyundai	2–1	2–1	—

== Appearances ==
=== By club ===
- K League's principle of official statistics is that final club succeeds to predecessor clubs.

Club	Apps	Seasons
Pohang Steelers (Note: Including POSCO Atoms and Pohang Atoms)	9	1986, 1995, 1998, 2004, 2006, 2007, 2008, 2009, 2011
Seongnam FC (Note: Including Ilhwa Chunma and Seongnam Ilhwa Chunma)	8	1995, 2000, 2005, 2006, 2007, 2008, 2009, 2010
Suwon Samsung Bluewings	8	1996, 1998, 1999, 2004, 2006, 2007, 2008, 2011
Ulsan Hyundai (Note: Including Ulsan Hyundai Horang-i)	8	1996, 1998, 2004, 2005, 2007, 2008, 2010, 2011
FC Seoul (Note: Including Lucky-Goldstar Hwangso and Anyang LG Cheetahs)	7	1986, 2000, 2006, 2008, 2009, 2010, 2011
Jeonbuk Hyundai Motors	5	2000, 2008, 2009, 2010, 2011
Jeju United (Note: Including Yukong Elephants, Bucheon SK)	4	1984, 1999, 2000, 2010
Jeonnam Dragons	4	1998, 1999, 2004, 2009
Busan IPark (Note: Including Daewoo Royals and Busan Daewoo Royals)	4	1984, 1999, 2005, 2011
Incheon United	2	2004, 2009
Gyeongnam FC	2	2007, 2010
Daejeon Citizen	1	2007

=== By city/province ===
- K League introduced home and away system in 1987.

City/Province	Apps	Clubs	Apps	Seasons
Pohang	8	Pohang Atoms	1	1995
Pohang	8	Pohang Steelers	7	1998, 2004, 2006, 2007, 2008, 2009, 2011
Suwon	8	Suwon Samsung Bluewings	8	1996, 1998, 1999, 2004, 2006, 2007, 2008, 2011
Ulsan	8	Ulsan Hyundai Horang-i	5	1996, 1998, 2004, 2005, 2007
Ulsan	8	Ulsan Hyundai	3	2008, 2010, 2011
Seongnam	7	Seongnam Ilhwa Chunma	7	2000, 2005, 2006, 2007, 2008, 2009, 2010
Seoul	6	Ilhwa Chunma	1	1995
Seoul	6	FC Seoul	5	2006, 2008, 2009, 2010, 2011
Jeonbuk	5	Jeonbuk Hyundai Motors	5	2000, 2008, 2009, 2010, 2011
Jeonnam	4	Jeonnam Dragons	4	1998, 1999, 2004, 2009
Busan	3	Busan Daewoo Royals	1	1999
Busan	3	Busan IPark	2	2005, 2011
Bucheon	2	Bucheon SK	2	1999, 2000
Incheon	2	Incheon United	2	2004, 2009
Gyeongnam	2	Gyeongnam FC	2	2007, 2010
Anyang	1	Anyang LG Cheetahs	1	2000
Daejeon	1	Daejeon Citizen	1	2007
Jeju	1	Jeju United	1	2010

=== By region ===
- K League introduced home and away system in 1987.

Region	Apps	City/Province	Apps
Gyeonggi region (Seoul metropolitan area)	26	Suwon	8
Gyeonggi region (Seoul metropolitan area)	26	Seongnam	7
Gyeonggi region (Seoul metropolitan area)	26	Seoul	6
Gyeonggi region (Seoul metropolitan area)	26	Bucheon	2
Gyeonggi region (Seoul metropolitan area)	26	Incheon	2
Gyeonggi region (Seoul metropolitan area)	26	Anyang	1
Yeongnam region (Gyeongsang)	21	Pohang	8
Yeongnam region (Gyeongsang)	21	Ulsan	8
Yeongnam region (Gyeongsang)	21	Busan	3
Yeongnam region (Gyeongsang)	21	Gyeongnam	2
Honam region (Jeolla)	9	Jeonbuk	5
Honam region (Jeolla)	9	Jeonnam	4
Hoseo region (Chungcheong)	1	Daejeon	1
Jeju region	1	Jeju	1

== See also ==
- K League
