= Busan IPark =

South Korean football club

- Full name: Busan IPark Football Club 부산 아이파크 축구단
- Founded: 22 November 1979; 46 years ago
- Ground: Busan Gudeok Stadium
- Capacity: 12,349
- Owner(s): HDC Hyundai Development Company (affiliated with HDC Group)
- Chairman: Chung Mong-gyu
- Manager: Jo Sung-hwan
- League: K League 2
- 2025: K League 2, 8th of 14
- Website: busanipark.com
Home colours	Away colours

Busan IPark FC (Korean: 부산 아이파크 FC) is a South Korean professional football club based in Busan that competes in K League 2, the second tier of the South Korean football pyramid. They play their home games at the Busan Gudeok Stadium.

Busan IPark was founded as a semi-professional team in November 1979 by Saehan Motors. The club was one of the original five founding members of the K League and continuously competed in the first division from 1983 to 2015, when they were relegated for the first time. Initially, the club was called Daewoo Royals, in reference to the motor company that originally owned and financed it. Since the early 2000s, Busan has received financial backing from the HDC Group and its apartment brand IPARK, rebranding as Pusan i.cons and later as Busan IPark.

== History ==
=== Daewoo Royals ===
After topping the league for most of the 1983 season, Daewoo finished second in their debut season, losing the title by one point to Hallelujah FC after a goalless draw against Yukong Elephants in the Masan Series. In its second season, the club turned professional, renamed as Daewoo Royals, and clinched its first league title after defeating Yukong Elephants by an aggregate score of 2–1 in the 1984 K League Championship playoff.

Daewoo Royals headed into the 1986 K League season as continental champions after clinching the 1985–86 Asian Club Championship, becoming the first South Korean side to accomplish this feat after defeating Al-Ahli 3–1 after extra time in Jeddah, Saudi Arabia. Despite the continental success, the team suffered a poor season and failed to reach the 1986 K League Championship playoff after finishing fourth in the first round of the league and third in the second.

The Royals clinched their second league title after finishing atop the league with 46 points in the 1987 season. They won their third title in 1991 after finishing ten points clear of the second-placed club, Hyundai Horang-i. The Royals' momentum didn't last as the club struggled in subsequent seasons, finishing at or near the bottom of the league.

=== Pusan Daewoo Royals ===
At the end of the 1995 season, K League sides began the process of "localizing", and the club became known as Pusan Daewoo Royals (Korean: 부산 대우 로얄즈) in reference to its city of residence. In 1997, they won their fourth league title, becoming the first team to win the K League Championship four times.

Although the 1998 season marked the emergence of a forward Ahn Jung-hwan, the Royals finished mid-table. The club did however manage to qualify for the 1999 K League Championship playoffs after finishing fourth in the regular season. During the playoffs, the Royals managed to knock out Chunnam Dragons and Bucheon SK to secure the right to face the defending champions, Suwon Samsung Bluewings, but lost in the final 4–2 on aggregate.

=== Pusan i.cons ===
As a company-owned club, the Royals' success was invariably linked to the health and success of its owner, Daewoo Corporation. In the early 2000s, the company parted ways with its once-successful sports franchise due to major financial problems that had accumulated since the late 1990s. IPark Construction, the domestic construction division of Hyundai, secured ownership of the club and acquired all of its history and records. The new owners not only renamed the club as Pusan i.cons, but also changed the club's home colours from blue to red and relocated the club from Busan Gudeok Stadium to Busan Asiad Stadium.

Under new ownership, the club rarely challenged for the title, finishing mid-table or near bottom of the league in the 2000s. Aside from winning the Korean FA Cup for the first time in the club's history in 2004 under the guidance of Scottish manager Ian Porterfield (defeating Bucheon SK in a penalty shoot-out), the trophy cabinet remained largely empty.

=== Busan IPark ===
At the onset of the 2005 season, the owners changed the club's name to Busan I'Park (currently Busan IPark). After winning the first round, Porterfield's Busan side reached the 2005 K-League Championship play-offs, but lost to a traditionally lightweight, but then-inspired Incheon United side led by Chang Woe-ryong.

For the 2008 season, Hwang Sun-hong took over as manager. Although Busan did not win any silverware during his tenure, he did manage to bring in players such as Kim Chang-soo, Jeong Shung-hoon, Yang Dong-hyun and Kim Geun-chul while injecting the team with much needed youth by giving prospects such as Han Sang-woon, Park Hee-do, and Park Jong-woo first-team opportunities. In his final season in charge of Busan, Hwang managed to lead his side to the 2010 Korean FA Cup final.

For the 2011 season, the board appointed An Ik-soo to take over from Hwang Sun-Hong who had left to manage his former club, Pohang Steelers. Under An, Busan managed to reach the playoffs for the first time since 2005 after finishing fifth on the league table in the regular season. An's Busan side was knocked out in the first round of the play-offs by Suwon Samsung Bluewings by a familiar scoreline of 1–0.

In February 2012, an adjustment was made to the club's name by dropping an apostrophe making the official name read Busan IPark.

In 2015, after nine successive bottom-half finishes, Busan IPark were relegated to the second-tier K League Challenge for the first time in their history.

Towards the end of the 2016 season, with an immediate return to the K League Classic looking unlikely, IPark moved back to their smaller, previous home ground, the Gudeok Stadium.

Busan IPark had an impressive 2017 season, although this was overshadowed by the death of then-manager Cho Jin-ho with only two weeks remaining in the season. Busan finished runners up in the K League Challenge to Gyeongnam FC, losing only 6 games all season. With caretaker manager, Lee Seung-yub in charge, Busan defeated Asan Mugunghwa, in the playoff semi-final, but lost on penalties after a two-legged final to Sangju Sangmu FC, who became the first K League Classic team to retain their league status via the playoffs. Busan also reached the final of the FA Cup, knocking out higher league opposition in Pohang Steelers, FC Seoul, Jeonnam Dragons and Suwon Bluewings but once again lost over a two-legged final, this time to Ulsan Hyundai.

For the 2018 season in the newly re-branded K League 2, Choi Yun-kyum was appointed manager after previously gaining promotion with Gangwon FC. Busan IPark eventually finished third in the K League 2, but for the second consecutive season lost in the two-legged playoff final, this time to FC Seoul. Despite again failing in their promotion bid, Busan broke numerous attendance records for the K League 2, including over 10,000 for the home leg of the playoff final. After failing to get promoted, manager Choi Yun-kyum resigned in the off-season and was replaced by Cho Deok-je. Busan enjoyed a successful 2019 season, with Cho Deok-je implementing an attacking brand of football that saw Busan finish as the top-scoring team in the division. Cho's side were built around young talents such as Kim Moon-hwan, Lee Dong-jun, and Kim Jin-kyu, as well as then national team striker Lee Jung-hyup, veteran midfielder Park Jong-woo, and Brazilian playmaker Rômulo. Busan IPark finished second in the K League 2 behind Gwangju FC, entering the promotion playoffs for the fourth season in a row. After defeating FC Anyang 1–0 at home, Busan faced local rivals Gyeongnam FC in a two-legged final. After a goalless first leg at the Gudeok Stadium, Busan won the away fixture 2–0 to secure their return to Korea's top division for the first time since 2015.

The 2020 season brought quite the opposite feelings, in comparison: the club quickly found itself fighting against relegation, and coach Cho Deok-je eventually left the club in September after a poor run of results. Former Incheon United coach Lee Ki-hyung took over in a caretaker capacity for the remaining four games of the season. After taking four points from his first two games in charge, Busan only needed a single point from either of their final games of the season to guarantee their top flight status for another year. However, despite leading at half-time against both Incheon United and Seongnam FC, Busan lost both games and finished in last place, thus getting relegated back to the K League 2.

Because of this major blow, at the start of 2021 Busan's board chose to pursue a general rebuild, which was opened by massive changes in the locker room: a multi-phased trade with Ulsan Hyundai saw Lee Kyu-seong and homegrown rising star Lee Dong-jun depart, in favour of Choi Jun, Park Jeong-in, Lee Sang-heon and Jung Hoon-sung; other prominent players, including Han Ji-ho (who went to Bucheon FC 1995), Kang Min-soo (to Incheon United), Rômulo (to Chengdu), Kim Moon-hwan (who joined MLS club Los Angeles FC) and Kwon Hyeok-kyu (due to military service at Gimcheon Sangmu), left the club as well; the previous year's top scorer and MVP, An Byong-jun, as well as Ahn Joon-soo, Park Min-gyu (on loan), Valentinos Sielis, Domagoj Drožđek and Ryan Edwards, were all brought in.

The team also had its first permanent foreign manager since 2007, as newcomer Ricardo Peres was appointed, following a conversation between the board and then South Korean national team head coach Paulo Bento, who Peres had worked with for years. Although the young Portuguese manager succeeded in implementing new training strategies at the club and giving young players more chances, he had a controversial relationship with supporters, while the team's results were panned by inconsistency and lack of balance: having the worst defence of the league (with 56 conceded goals) and relying mainly on two players for goals (An Byong-jun and Park Jeong-in), Busan finished fifth in the league and out of the promotion play-offs. Nevertheless, new positives were still taken as backbone player Kim Jin-kyu established himself as one of the best midfielders of the season, while Choi Jun and An Byong-jun were nominated in the league's Best XI, as the latter also won both his second Top Scorer and MVP awards in a row.

=== Club name history ===
Name	Period
Saehan Motors FC	1979–1980
Daewoo FC	1980–1982
Daewoo Royals	1983–1995
Pusan Daewoo Royals	1996–2000
Pusan i.cons	2000–2002
Busan I'Cons	2002–2005
Busan I'Park	2005–2011
Busan IPark	2012–present

== Youth teams ==
In 2012, Busan IPark signed an agreement with Gaesong High School, taking the school's pre-existing football team under the club's umbrella as its under-18 team. The team competes in K League Junior, the youth division of K League. IPark were runners-up in the 2013 edition of the tournament. Since 2015, the club has also operated an under-15 team in affiliation with Nakdong Middle School. The club's academy system also operates boys' teams at under-12 and under-9 level. In 2024, Busan IPark became the first professional club in South Korea to launch an under-15 girls' team, announcing plans to further expand their girls' academy provision with under-12 and under-18 teams in the future.

== Players ==
=== Current squad ===
As of 28 July 2026

Note: Flags indicate national team as defined under FIFA eligibility rules; some limited exceptions apply. Players may hold more than one non-FIFA nationality.

No.	Pos.	Nation	Player
1	GK	KOR	Koo Sang-min
2	DF	UZB	Otabek Ahadov
3	DF	KOR	Cho Dong-jae (on loan from Hwaseong FC)
4	DF	KOR	Kim Jin-hyuk (on loan from Daegu FC)
5	DF	KOR	Woo Joo-sung
6	MF	KOR	Lee Dong-soo
7	MF	BRA	Xavier
8	MF	KOR	Kim Min-hyeok
9	FW	KOR	Kim Chan (vice-captain)
10	MF	BRA	Gabriel Honório
11	DF	KOR	Ahn Hyeon-beom (vice-captain)
13	MF	KOR	Kim Hyun-min
17	DF	KOR	Jeon Sung-jin
18	FW	KOR	Baek Ga-on
20	DF	KOR	Kim Hee-seung

No.	Pos.	Nation	Player
21	MF	KOR	Kim Dong-wook
31	GK	KOR	Kim Yu-rae
34	GK	KOR	Park Ji-min
42	FW	KOR	Lee Ho-jin
44	DF	KOR	Choi Dong-ryeol
47	MF	KOR	Son Hwi
55	DF	KOR	Kwon Jun-seong
66	DF	KOR	Kim Se-hoon
70	GK	KOR	Song An-ton
72	MF	KOR	Kim Dong-yoon
77	DF	KOR	Jang Ho-ik (captain)
80	FW	BRA	Antonio Gutemberg
88	MF	KOR	Park Hye-sung
97	MF	KOR	Son Jun-seok
99	FW	BRA	Cristian Renato

=== Out on loan ===
Note: Flags indicate national team as defined under FIFA eligibility rules; some limited exceptions apply. Players may hold more than one non-FIFA nationality.

No.	Pos.	Nation	Player
—	DF	KOR	Choi Ye-hoon (at Hwaseong FC)
—	DF	KOR	Kim Jin-rae (at Jinju Citizen for military service)

No.	Pos.	Nation	Player
—	MF	KOR	Lim Min-hyeok (at Jinju Citizen for military service)

=== Retired number(s) ===
12 — Club supporters (the 12th man)
16 — (South Korea) Kim Joo-sung, 1987–1999 (winger, attacking midfielder, centre-back)

== Backroom staff ==
=== Coaching staff ===
- Manager: (South Korea) Jo Sung-hwan
- Head coach: (South Korea) Yoo Kyoung-youl
- Goalkeeping coach: (South Korea) Choi Hyun
- Physical coach: (South Korea) Choi Joon-hyuk
- Coaches: (South Korea) Choi Jae-soo, (South Korea) Jo Sung-jin

=== Support staff ===
- Medical trainer: (South Korea) Kang Hoon
- Physical therapist: (South Korea) Lee Gwang-dong
- Trainer: (South Korea) Kim Young-hyun
- Team doctors: (South Korea) Kim Myeong-jun, (South Korea) Kim Ho-jun
- Analysts: (South Korea) Jeon Gon-jae, (South Korea) Yeo Seong-hyuk
- Interpreter: (South Korea) Choi Yu-up
- Equipment manager: (South Korea) Kang Gun-mo

Source: Official website

== Kits ==
=== Kit suppliers ===
- 1983–1992: Adidas
- 1993–1995: Erima
- 1996–1998: Adidas
- 1999: Fila
- 2000–2003: Nike
- 2004: Kappa
- 2005–2006: Hummel
- 2007–2011: Fila
- 2012–2013: Puma
- 2014–2017: Adidas
- 2018–2021: None (the club used the Adidas uniform sponsored by Kika)
- 2022–2023: Puma
- 2024–2025: Mizuno
- 2026–present: Puma

== Honours ==
=== Domestic ===
==== League ====
- K League 1
  - Winners (4): 1984, 1987, 1991, 1997
  - Runners-up (3): 1983, 1990, 1999
- K League 2
  - Runners-up (3): 2017, 2019, 2023
- Korean National Semi-Professional Football League
  - Winners: 1981 Spring

==== Cups ====
- Korean FA Cup
  - Winners: 2004
  - Runners-up (2): 2010, 2017
- Korean League Cup
  - Winners (3): 1997, 1997s, 1998s
  - Runners-up (5): 1986, 1999s, 2001, 2009, 2011
- Korean National Football Championship
  - Winners (2): 1989, 1990 (reserve team)
  - Runners-up: 1988
- Korean President's Cup
  - Runners-up: 1981
- Korean Super Cup
  - Runners-up: 2005

=== International ===
==== Continental ====
- Asian Club Championship
  - Winners: 1985–86

==== Worldwide ====
- Afro-Asian Club Championship
  - Winners: 1986

==== Invitational ====
- Hawaiian Islands Invitational
  - Winners: 2012

== Season-by-season records ==
Season	League										Korean Cup	ACL	Other
Season	Division	GP	W	D	L	GF	GA	GD	Pts	Pos.	Korean Cup	ACL	Other
1983	1	16	6	7	3	21	14	+7	19	2	—	—	—
1984	1	28	17	6	5	47	23	+24	59	1	—	—	—
1985	1	21	9	7	5	22	16	+6	25	3	—	—	—
1986	1	20	10	2	8	26	24	+2	22	4	—	W	AACC — W
1987	1	32	16	14	2	41	20	+21	46	1	—	—	—
1988	1	24	8	5	11	28	30	–2	21	5	—	—	—
1989	1	40	14	14	12	44	44	0	42	3	—	—	—
1990	1	30	12	11	7	30	25	+5	35	2	—	—	—
1991	1	30	17	18	5	49	32	+17	52	1	—	—	—
1992	1	30	7	14	9	26	33	–7	28	5	—	—	LC — 6th
1993	1	30	5	15	10	22	32	–10	40	6	—	—	LC — 3rd
1994	1	30	7	6	17	37	56	–19	27	6	—	—	LC — 3rd
1995	1	28	9	5	14	30	40	–10	32	5	—	—	LC — 3rd
1996	1	32	9	9	14	45	51	–6	36	6	QF	—	LC — 3rd
1997	1	18	11	4	3	24	9	+15	37	1	1R	—	LC(A) — W
1997	1	18	11	4	3	24	9	+15	37	1	1R	—	LC(P) — W
1998	1	18	6	4	8	27	22	+5	25	5	QF	—	LC(A) — GS
1998	1	18	6	4	8	27	22	+5	25	5	QF	—	LC(P) — W
1999	1	27	10	4	13	37	36	+1	37	2 (Note: 4th in league, 2nd in play-offs)	Ro16	QF	LC(A) — PR
1999	1	27	10	4	13	37	36	+1	37	2	Ro16	QF	LC(D) — RU
2000	1	27	9	2	16	42	42	0	29	6	SF	—	LC(A) — QF
2000	1	27	9	2	16	42	42	0	29	6	SF	—	LC(D) — GS
2001	1	27	10	11	6	38	33	+5	41	5	QF	—	LC — RU
2002	1	27	6	8	13	36	45	–9	26	9	QF	—	LC — GS
2003	1	44	13	10	21	41	71	–30	49	9	Ro32	—	—
2004	1	24	6	12	6	21	19	+2	30	7	W	—	LC — 13th
2005	1	24	7	7	10	28	31	–3	28	10	Ro32	SF	LC — 13th
2005	1	24	7	7	10	28	31	–3	28	10	Ro32	SF	SC — RU
2006	1	26	9	7	10	40	42	–2	34	8	Ro16	—	LC — 10th
2007	1	26	4	8	14	20	39	–19	20	13	QF	—	LC — GS
2008	1	26	5	7	14	30	39	–9	22	12	Ro16	—	LC — QF
2009	1	28	7	8	13	36	42	–6	29	12	Ro16	—	LC — RU
2010	1	28	8	9	11	36	37	–1	33	8	RU	—	LC — QF
2011	1	30	13	7	10	49	43	+6	46	6 (Note: 5th in league, 6th in play-offs)	QF	—	LC — RU
2012	1	44	13	14	17	40	51	–11	53	7	Ro32	—	—
2013	1	38	14	10	14	43	41	+2	52	6	SF	—	—
2014	1	38	10	13	15	37	49	–12	43	8	QF	—	—
2015	1	38	5	11	22	30	55	–25	26	11↓	Ro32	—	—
2016	2	40	19	7	14	52	39	+13	64	5	Ro16	—	—
2017	2	36	19	11	6	52	30	+22	68	2	RU	—	—
2018	2	36	14	14	8	53	35	+18	56	3	Ro16	—	—
2019	2	36	18	13	5	72	47	+25	67	2↑	3R	—	—
2020	1	27	5	10	12	25	38	–13	25	12↓	QF	—	—
2021	2	36	12	9	15	46	56	–10	45	5	3R	—	—
2022	2	40	9	9	22	34	52	–18	36	10	3R	—	—
2023	2	36	20	10	6	50	29	+21	70	2	3R	—	—
2024	2	36	16	8	12	55	45	+10	56	5	3R	—	—
2025	2	39	14	13	12	47	46	+1	55	8	2R	—	—

Key

- W = Winners
- RU = Runners-up
- SF = Semi-final
- QF = Quarter-final
- Ro16 = Round of 16
- Ro32 = Round of 32
- GS = Group stage
- PR = Preliminary round
- 3R = Third round
- 2R = Second round

== AFC Champions League record ==
All results list Busan's goal tally first.

Season	Round	Opposition	Home	Away	Agg.
2005	Group G	(Vietnam) Bình Định	8–0	4–0	1st
2005	Group G	(Thailand) Krung Thai Bank	4–0	2–0	1st
2005	Group G	(Indonesia) Persebaya Surabaya	4–0	3–0	1st
2005	Quarter-final	(Qatar) Al-Sadd	3–0	2–1	5–1
2005	Semi-final	(Saudi Arabia) Al-Ittihad	0–5	0–2	0–7

== Managerial history ==
No.	Name	From	To	Notes
	(South Korea) Lee Jong-hwan	1979	1980	Manager of predecessor club Saehan Motors FC
1	(South Korea) Chang Woon-soo	1981	1983	
2	(South Korea) Cho Yoon-ok	1984	1984	
3	(South Korea) Chang Woon-soo	1984	1986	1984 K League winner 1985–86 Asian Club Championship winner
4	(South Korea) Lee Cha-man	1987	1989	1987 K League winner
C	(South Korea) Kim Hee-tae	1989	1989	
5	(West Germany) Frank Engel	1990	1990	
6	(Hungary) Bertalan Bicskei	1991	1991	1991 K League winner
7	(South Korea) Lee Cha-man	1992	1992	
C	(South Korea) Cho Kwang-rae	1992	1992	
8	(South Korea) Cho Kwang-rae	1993	1994	
C	(South Korea) Chung Hae-won	1994	1994	
9	(South Korea) Kim Hee-tae	1994	1995	
C	(South Korea) Shin Woo-sung	1995	1995	
10	(Federal Republic of Yugoslavia) Dragoslav Šekularac	1996	1996	
C	(South Korea) Kim Tae-soo	1996	1996	
11	(South Korea) Lee Cha-man	1997	1999	1997 K League winner
C	(South Korea) Shin Yoon-ki	1999	1999	
C	(South Korea) Chang Woe-ryong	1999	1999	
12	(South Korea) Kim Ho-kon	2000	2002	
C	(South Korea) Park Kyung-hoon	2002	2002	
13	(Scotland) Ian Porterfield	2003	2006	2004 Korean FA Cup winner
C	(South Korea) Kim Pan-gon	2006	2006	
14	(Switzerland) Andy Egli	2006	2007	
C	(South Korea) Kim Pan-gon	2007	2007	
15	(South Korea) Park Sung-hwa	2007	2007	Managed only one match in FA Cup
C	(South Korea) Kim Pan-gon	2007	2007	
16	(South Korea) Hwang Sun-hong	2008	2010	
17	(South Korea) An Ik-soo	2011	2012	
18	(South Korea) Yoon Sung-hyo	2013	2015	
C	(Brazil) Denis Iwamura	2015	2015	
19	(South Korea) Choi Young-jun	2015	2016	Relegated to K League Challenge in 2015
20	(South Korea) Cho Jin-ho	2017	2017	Died on 10 October 2017
C	(South Korea) Lee Seung-yub	2017	2017	
21	(South Korea) Choi Yun-kyum	2018	2018	
22	(South Korea) Cho Deok-je	2019	2020	Promoted to K League 1 in 2019
C	(South Korea) Lee Ki-hyung	2020	2020	Relegated to K League 2 in 2020
23	(Portugal) Ricardo Peres	2021	2022	
24	(South Korea) Park Jin-sub	2022	2024	
C	(South Korea) Yoo Kyoung-youl	2024	2024	
25	(South Korea) Jo Sung-hwan	2024	Present	
