= 2006 AFC Champions League final =

- Event: 2006 AFC Champions League
Jeonbuk Hyundai Motors	Al-Karamah
(South Korea)	(Syria)
3	2

First leg
Jeonbuk Hyundai Motors	Al-Karamah
2	0
- Date: 1 November 2006
- Venue: Jeonju World Cup Stadium, Jeonju
- Referee
- Attendance: 25,830

Second leg
Al-Karamah	Jeonbuk Hyundai Motors
2	1
- Date: 8 November 2006
- Venue: Khaled bin Walid Stadium, Homs
- Referee: Mark Shield
- Attendance: 40,000

The 2006 AFC Champions League final was a two-legged football tie to determine the 2006 champions of Asian club football. South Korean club Jeonbuk Hyundai Motors defeated Syrian representative Al-Karamah 3–2 on aggregate to take the title. As of 2022, this was the only final of an AFC Champions League involving a Syrian club. The first leg took place on 1 November 2006 at 19:00 local time (UTC+9) at Jeonju World Cup Stadium in Jeonju, which Jeonbuk Hyundai Motors won 2–0. The second leg took place on 8 November 2006 at 20:00 local time (UTC+3) at Khaled bin Walid Stadium, Homs, which Al-Karamah took 2–1.

== Format ==
The rules for the final were exactly the same as for the previous knockout rounds. The tie was contested over two legs with away goals deciding the winner if the two teams were level on goals after the second leg. If the teams could still not be separated at that stage then extra time would have been played with a penalty shootout taking place if the teams were still level after that.

== The Route to the final ==
=== Al-Karamah ===
Opponents	Round	H/A	Score^{1}	Al-Karamah goalscorers
(United Arab Emirates) Al-Wahda	Group Stage	H	2–1	Mohamad Al Hamawi, Ahmad Turkmani
(Iran) Saba Battery	Group Stage	A	2–1	Jehad Al-Hussain, Mohannad Ibrahim
(Qatar) Al-Gharafa	Group Stage	A	0–4	
(Qatar) Al-Gharafa	Group Stage	H	3–1	Ahmad Turkmani (2), Abdel Kader Rifai
(United Arab Emirates) Al-Wahda	Group Stage	A	2–4	Abdel Kader Rifai, Aatef Jenyat
(Iran) Saba Battery	Group Stage	H	1–0	Abdel Kader Rifai
(Saudi Arabia) Al-Ittihad	Quarterfinal 1st leg	A	0–2	
(Saudi Arabia) Al-Ittihad	Quarterfinal 2nd leg	H	4–0	Ahmad Omaier, Mohamad Al Hamawi, Mohannad Ibrahim (2)
(Kuwait) Al-Qadisiya	Semifinal 1st leg	H	0–0	
(Kuwait) Al-Qadisiya	Semifinal 2nd leg	A	1–0	Aatef Jenyat

^{1}Al-Karamah's score is shown first.

=== Jeonbuk Hyundai Motors ===
Opponents	Round	H/A	Score^{1}	Jeonbuk Hyundai Motors goalscorers
(Japan) Gamba Osaka	Group Stage	H	3–2	Milton Rodriguez, Kim Hyeung-Bum (2)
(China) Dalian Shide	Group Stage	A	0–1	
(Vietnam) Da Nang	Group Stage	H	3–0	Milton Rodriguez, Kim Hyeung-Bum, Botti
(Vietnam) Da Nang	Group Stage	A	1–0	Zé Carlos
(Japan) Gamba Osaka	Group Stage	A	1–1	Cho Jin-Soo
(China) Dalian Shide	Group Stage	H	3–1	Kim Hyeung-Bum (2), Wang Jung-Hyun
(China) Shanghai Shenhua	Quarterfinal 1st leg	A	0–1	
(China) Shanghai Shenhua	Quarterfinal 2nd leg	H	4–2	Zé Carlos (2), Yeom Ki-Hun, Jung Jong-Kwan
(South Korea) Ulsan Hyundai Horang-i	Semifinal 1st leg	H	2–3	Zé Carlos, Yeom Ki-Hun
(South Korea) Ulsan Hyundai Horang-i	Semifinal 2nd leg	A	4–1	Choi Jin-Cheul, Jung Jong-Kwan, Lim Yoo-Hwan, Lee Kwang-Hyun

^{1}Jeonbuk Hyundai Motors's score is shown first.

== Final summary ==
Team 1	Agg.	Team 2	1st leg	2nd leg
Jeonbuk Hyundai Motors (South Korea)	3–2	(Syria) Al-Karamah	2–0	1–2

=== First leg ===
1 November 2006
19:00 (UTC+9)

Jeonbuk Hyundai Motors (South Korea)	2 – 0	(Syria) Al-Karamah
Yeom Ki-Hun 59'; Botti 90+1'

Jeonju World Cup Stadium, Jeonju
Attendance: 25,830
Referee:

Jeonbuk Hyundai Motors	Al-Karamah

JEONBUK HYUNDAI MOTORS:
GK	21	(South Korea) Kwon Sun-Tae
DF	8	(South Korea) Jung Jong-Kwan
DF	4	(South Korea) Choi Jin-Cheul
DF	5	(South Korea) Kim Young-Sun
DF	26	(South Korea) Jang Ji-Hyun
MF	11	(South Korea) Yeom Ki-Hun	(substituted off) 86'
MF	6	(South Korea) Kim Hyun-Soo	(substituted off) 50'
MF	16	(South Korea) Lim You-Hwan
MF	22	(South Korea) Kim Hyeung-Bum
FW	28	(South Korea) Wang Jung-Hyun	(substituted off) 56'
FW	15	(Brazil) Zé Carlos
Substitutes:
GK	27	(South Korea) Sung Kyung-Il
DF	18	(South Korea) Heo Hoon-Goo
DF	20	(South Korea) Kim In-Ho	(substituted on) 86'
MF	9	(South Korea) Han Je-Kwang
MF	12	(South Korea) Jeon Kwang-Hwan	(substituted on) 56'
MF	13	(South Korea) Shin Sang-Hoon
MF	17	(South Korea) Choi Young-Hoon
FW	10	(Brazil) Botti	(substituted on) 50'
FW	25	(South Korea) Jung Soo-Jong
Manager:
(South Korea) Choi Kang-Hee

AL-KARAMAH:
GK	1	(Syria) Mosab Balhous
DF	14	(Syria) Anas Al Khouja
DF	3	(Brazil) Fabio Santos
DF	5	(Syria) Jihad Qassab	(yellow card) 73'
MF	21	(Syria) Aatef Jenyat	(yellow card) 51'
MF	10	(Syria) Iyad Mando
MF	7	(Syria) Abdel Kader Rifai		(substituted off) 86'
MF	9	(Syria) Mohamad Al Hamawi
MF	6	(Syria) Jehad Al-Hussain
FW	8	(Syria) Mohannad Ibrahim		(substituted off) 66'
FW	20	(Syria) Ahmad Omaier		(substituted off) 79'
Substitutes:
GK	22	(Syria) Adnan Al Hafez
DF	2	(Syria) Naser Al Sebai		(substituted on) 66'
DF	4	(Syria) Hassan Abbas
DF	13	(Syria) Belal Abduldaim
DF	23	(Syria) Tawfek Taearah
MF	15	(Syria) Odai Mohamad Eid		(substituted on) 86'
MF	18	(Syria) Mahmoud Al Malloul
MF	24	(Syria) Mohamad Abdulkader
FW	17	(Syria) Yussef Sleman		(substituted on) 79'
Manager:
(Syria) Mohammad Kwid

=== Second leg ===
8 November 2006
20:00 (UTC+3)

Al-Karamah (Syria)	2 – 1	(South Korea) Jeonbuk Hyundai Motors
Iyad Mando 54'; Mohannad Ibrahim 61'		Zé Carlos 86'

Khaled bin Walid Stadium, Homs
Attendance: 40,000
Referee: Mark Shield (Australia)

Al-Karamah	Jeonbuk Hyundai Motors

AL-KARAMAH:
GK	1	(Syria) Mosab Balhous
DF	14	(Syria) Anas Al Khouja
DF	3	(Brazil) Fabio Santos
DF	13	(Syria) Belal Abduldaim		(substituted off) 86'
DF	5	(Syria) Jihad Qassab	(yellow card) 56'
MF	7	(Syria) Abdel Kader Rifai
MF	10	(Syria) Iyad Mando
MF	6	(Syria) Jehad Al-Hussain
MF	21	(Syria) Aatef Jenyat
FW	8	(Syria) Mohannad Ibrahim
FW	9	(Syria) Mohamad Al Hamawi		(substituted off) 64'
Substitutes:
GK	22	(Syria) Adnan Al Hafez
DF	2	(Syria) Naser Al Sebai
DF	4	(Syria) Hassan Abbas
DF	23	(Syria) Tawfek Taearah
MF	11	(Syria) Fahd Aodi
MF	15	(Syria) Odai Mohamad Eid
MF	18	(Syria) Mahmoud Al Malloul
FW	19	(Syria) Abdulrahman Akkari		(substituted on) 86'
FW	20	(Syria) Ahmad Omaier		(substituted on) 64'
Manager:
(Syria) Mohammad Kwid

JEONBUK HYUNDAI MOTORS:
GK	21	(South Korea) Kwon Sun-Tae
DF	4	(South Korea) Choi Jin-Cheul
DF	5	(South Korea) Kim Young-Sun
DF	6	(South Korea) Kim Hyun-Soo
MF	12	(South Korea) Jeon Kwang-Hwan	(substituted off) 66'
MF	26	(South Korea) Jang Ji-Hyun
MF	16	(South Korea) Lim You-Hwan
MF	19	(South Korea) Kwon Jip	(substituted off) 56'
FW	8	(South Korea) Jung Jong-Kwan
FW	11	(South Korea) Yeom Ki-Hun
FW	15	(Brazil) Zé Carlos	(substituted off) 88'
Substitutes:
GK	27	(South Korea) Sung Kyung-Il
DF	18	(South Korea) Heo Hoon-Goo
DF	20	(South Korea) Kim In-Ho	(substituted on) 66'
DF	28	(South Korea) Wang Jung-Hyun	(substituted on) 88'
MF	17	(South Korea) Choi Young-Hoon
MF	22	(South Korea) Kim Hyeung-Bum	(substituted on) 56'
FW	10	(Brazil) Botti
FW	25	(South Korea) Jung Soo-Jong
Manager:
(South Korea) Choi Kang-Hee

== See also ==
- 2006 AFC Champions League
- 2006 FIFA Club World Cup
