= 2005 Korean FA Cup final =

- Event: 2005 Korean FA Cup
Hyundai Mipo Dockyard	Jeonbuk Hyundai Motors
0	1
- Date: 17 December 2005
- Venue: Seoul World Cup Stadium, Seoul
- Man of the Match: Milton Rodríguez (Jeonbuk Hyundai Motors)
- Referee: Kwon Jong-chul
- Attendance: 1,125

The 2005 Korean FA Cup final was a football match played on 17 December 2005 at Seoul World Cup Stadium in Seoul that decided the champions of the 2005 Korean FA Cup. It was contested between Hyundai Mipo Dockyard and Jeonbuk Hyundai Motors, and kicked off at 14:00 (KST).

Hyundai Mipo Dockyard was the first semi-professional club (not affiliated to the K League) to reach the FA Cup final.

== Road to the final ==
Hyundai Mipo Dockyard		Round	Jeonbuk Hyundai Motors	
Opponent	Result	Round	Opponent	Result
Busan IPark (N)	2–1	Round of 32	Korea University (N)	2–0
Daejeon Citizen (N)	1–1 (a.e.t.) (3–2 p)	Round of 16	FC Seoul (N)	2–1
Pohang Steelers (N)	0–0 (a.e.t.) (4–3 p)	Quarter-finals	Suwon Samsung Bluewings (N)	3–3 (a.e.t.) (4–2 p)
Jeonnam Dragons (N)	3–1	Semi-finals	Incheon Korail (N)	3–1

== Details ==
17 December 2005
14:00 KST

Hyundai Mipo Dockyard	0–1	Jeonbuk Hyundai Motors
		Rodríguez 13'

Seoul World Cup Stadium, Seoul
Attendance: 1,125
Referee: Kwon Jong-chul

Hyundai Mipo Dockyard	Jeonbuk Hyundai Motors

GK	1	(South Korea) Yang Ji-won
DF	3	(South Korea) Lim Joon-sik
DF	15	(South Korea) Lee Jae-chun
DF	16	(South Korea) Kim Jong-young	(yellow card) 34'
DF	20	(South Korea) Cheon Jeong-hee
DF	23	(South Korea) Son Sang-ho		(substituted off) 56'
MF	6	(South Korea) Cho Yong-suk
MF	7	(South Korea) Park Hee-wan (c)		(substituted off) 83'
MF	10	(South Korea) Jeong Jae-suk
FW	18	(South Korea) Jeon Sang-dae		(substituted off) 60'
FW	22	(South Korea) Kim Young-ki
Substitutes:
DF	14	(South Korea) Woo Joo-young		(substituted on) 56'
FW	11	(South Korea) Yang Ji-hoon		(substituted on) 83'
FW	13	(South Korea) Jeong Min-moo		(substituted on) 60'
Manager:
(South Korea) Yoo Jin-hoi (caretaker)

GK	1	(South Korea) Lee Kwang-suk
DF	4	(South Korea) Choi Jin-cheul (c)
DF	6	(South Korea) Kim Hyun-su
DF	28	(South Korea) Wang Jung-hyun
MF	7	(South Korea) Jung Jong-kwan
MF	10	(Brazil) Raphael Botti
MF	13	(South Korea) Kim Jung-kyum
MF	32	(South Korea) Jeon Kwang-hwan
FW	18	(Colombia) Milton Rodriguez
FW	30	(South Korea) Gu Hyun-seo
FW	42	(South Korea) Cho Jin-soo	(yellow card) 33'	(substituted off) 65'
Substitutes:
MF	8	(South Korea) Yoon Jung-hwan		(substituted on) 65'
Manager:
(South Korea) Choi Kang-hee

Man of the Match:
Milton Rodríguez (Jeonbuk Hyundai Motors)

Assistant referees:
Kim Seon-jin
Kang Chang-gu
Fourth official:
Choi Myung-yong

Match rules

- 90 minutes
- 30 minutes of extra time if necessary
- Penalty shoot-out if scores still level
- Seven named substitutes
- Maximum of three substitutions

== See also ==
- 2005 Korean FA Cup
