= 1998 Arab Cup squads =

Below is a list of squads used in the 1998 Arab Cup.

== Group A ==
=== Jordan ===
Head coach: (Bosnia and Herzegovina) Vukašin Višnjevac

No.	Pos.	Player	Date of birth (age)	Caps	Goals	Club
	GK	Mohammed Abu Daoud	4 September 1968 (aged 30)			(Jordan Football Association) Al-Wehdat
	DF	Haitham Simreen	7 February 1977 (aged 21)			(Jordan Football Association) Al-Wehdat
	DF	Mohannad Mahadeen	7 April 1973 (aged 25)			(Jordan Football Association) Al-Faisaly
	DF	Amjad Al-Taher	24 January 1973 (aged 25)			(Jordan Football Association) Al-Qadisiya
	DF	Hatem Aqel	20 June 1978 (aged 20)			(Jordan Football Association) Al-Faisaly
	DF	Leith Al-Dardour	4 March 1977 (aged 21)			(Jordan Football Association) Al-Wehdat
	DF	Osama Talal	10 February 1973 (aged 25)			(Jordan Football Association) Al-Faisaly
	MF	Sobhy Soliman	8 February 1969 (aged 29)			(Jordan Football Association) Al-Faisaly
	MF	Hassouneh Al-Sheikh	26 January 1977 (aged 21)			(Jordan Football Association) Al-Faisaly
	MF	Ra'fat Ali	20 May 1975 (aged 23)			(Jordan Football Association) Al-Wehdat
	MF	Abdullah Abu Zema	4 April 1976 (aged 22)			(Jordan Football Association) Al-Wehdat
	MF	Haitham Al-Shboul	13 August 1974 (aged 24)			(Jordan Football Association) Al-Faisaly
	FW	Badran Al-Shaqran	19 January 1974 (aged 24)			(Jordan Football Association) Al-Ramtha
	FW	Abdullah Al-Sheyab	28 February 1975 (aged 23)			(Jordan Football Association) Al-Hussein Irbid
	FW	Sufian Abdullah Daoud	6 February 1975 (aged 23)			(Jordan Football Association) Al-Wehdat

=== Libya ===
Head coach: Abdel Jalil Heshani

No.	Pos.	Player	Date of birth (age)	Caps	Goals	Club
	GK	Samir Aboud	29 September 1972 (aged 25)			(Libyan Football Federation) Al-Ittihad
	DF	Mahmoud Makhlouf Shaftar	17 August 1975 (aged 23)			(Libyan Football Federation) Al-Mahalla
	DF	Omar Mariemi	7 March 1972 (aged 26)			(Libyan Football Federation) Al-Ahli
	MF	Tareq Ibrahim Al-Taib	28 February 1977 (aged 21)			(Libyan Football Federation) Al-Ahli
	MF	Ezzedin Faraj Al-Masrati	1973			(Libyan Football Federation) Al-Majd
	MF	Ossama Al-Wahishi	24 April 1976 (aged 22)			(Libyan Football Federation) Al-Hilal
	FW	Ahmed Al Masli	28 December 1979 (aged 18)			(Libyan Football Federation) Al Tahaddy
	FW	Khaled Shebli	2 September 1974 (aged 24)			(Libyan Football Federation) Al-Ittihad
	FW	Khaled Ramadan Al-Margani	4 July 1974 (aged 24)			(Libyan Football Federation) Al-Ittihad
		Walid Adam				(Libyan Football Federation)
		Sassi Al-Jabali				(Libyan Football Federation)
		Mohamed Al-Said				(Libyan Football Federation)
		Khaled Youssouf				(Libyan Football Federation)
		Ramzi Abdulsalam				(Libyan Football Federation)
		Salem Muftah				(Libyan Football Federation)
		Hisham Hussein				(Libyan Football Federation)

=== Qatar ===
Head coach: (Brazil) Luiz Gonzaga Milioli

No.	Pos.	Player	Date of birth (age)	Caps	Goals	Club
	GK	Ahmed Khalil	17 October 1969 (aged 28)			(Qatar Football Association) Al Arabi
	DF	Abdulla Koni	19 July 1979 (aged 19)			(Qatar Football Association) Al Sadd
	MF	Abdulrahman Al-Kuwari	17 October 1969 (aged 28)			(Qatar Football Association) Al-Rayyan
	DF	Dahi Al Naemi	5 September 1978 (aged 20)			(Qatar Football Association) Al-Sadd
	DF	Yousef Adam	12 September 1972 (aged 26)			(Qatar Football Association) Al-Gharafa
	DF	Saoud Fath	16 August 1980 (aged 18)			(Qatar Football Association) Al-Gharafa
	MF	Adel Khamis	1 January 1967 (aged 31)			(Kuwait Football Association) Qadsia
	FW	Mubarak Mustafa	20 March 1973 (aged 25)			(Qatar Football Association) Al-Arabi
	MF	Zamel Essa Al-Kuwari	23 August 1973 (aged 25)			(Qatar Football Association) Al-Sadd
	MF	Abdulnasser Al-Obaidly	2 October 1972 (aged 25)			(Qatar Football Association) Al-Sadd
	DF	Hamad Mubarak	22 August 1971 (aged 27)			(Qatar Football Association) Al-Rayyan
	MF	Abdulaziz Jalouf	27 February 1973 (aged 25)			(Qatar Football Association) Qatar SC
	FW	Mohammed Al-Enazi	22 November 1976 (aged 21)			(Saudi Arabian Football Federation) Al-Nassr
	FW	Mahmoud Soufi	20 October 1971 (aged 26)			(Qatar Football Association) Al-Gharafa
	MF	Yasser Nazmi	23 September 1973 (aged 25)			(Qatar Football Association) Qatar SC
	MF	Fahad Rashid Al-Kuwari	19 December 1973 (aged 24)			(Qatar Football Association) Al-Sadd
	MF	Jassim Al-Tamimi	14 February 1971 (aged 27)			(Qatar Football Association) Al-Wakrah
	DF	Adel Darwish	8 May 1973 (aged 25)			(Qatar Football Association) Al-Sadd
	GK	Amer Al-Kaabi	20 May 1971 (aged 27)			(Qatar Football Association) Al-Ahli SC

== Group B ==
=== Kuwait ===
Head coach: (Czech Republic) Milan Máčala

No.	Pos.	Player	Date of birth (age)	Caps	Goals	Club
	GK	Khaled Al-Fadhli	15 May 1974 (aged 24)			(Kuwait Football Association) Kazma
	GK	Ahmad Al-Jasem	29 May 1975 (aged 23)			(Kuwait Football Association) Al-Arabi
	DF	Jamal Abdulrahman Mubarak	21 March 1974 (aged 24)			(Kuwait Football Association) Al-Tadamon
	DF	Nohayer Mohsen Al-Shammari	12 July 1976 (aged 22)			(Kuwait Football Association) Sulaibikhat
	DF	Esam Sakeen	2 July 1971 (aged 27)			(Kuwait Football Association) Kazma
	DF	Hussain Al-Khoddari	7 February 1972 (aged 26)			(Kuwait Football Association) Al-Salmiya
	DF	Adel Youssef Ali				(Kuwait Football Association)
	DF	Ali Asel	28 September 1976 (aged 21)			(Kuwait Football Association) Al-Salmiya
	MF	Ahmad Al-Mutairi	13 February 1974 (aged 24)			(Kuwait Football Association) Kazma
	MF	Fawaz Al-Ahmad	9 November 1969 (aged 28)			(Kuwait Football Association) Kazma
	MF	Badr Haji	10 December 1967 (aged 30)			(Saudi Arabian Football Federation) Al Shabab
	MF	Hamad Al-Saleh				(Saudi Arabian Football Federation) Al-Qadsia
	MF	Mohammad Al-Buraiki	10 July 1980 (aged 18)			(Kuwait Football Association) Al-Salmiya
	FW	Jasem Al-Huwaidi	28 October 1972 (aged 25)			(Kuwait Football Association) Al-Salmiya
	FW	Bashar Abdullah	12 October 1977 (aged 20)			(Kuwait Football Association) Al-Salmiya
	FW	Hani Al-Saqer	8 January 1973 (aged 25)			(Saudi Arabian Football Federation) Al-Qadsia
	FW	Ali Marwi	14 October 1969 (aged 28)			(Kuwait Football Association) Al-Salmiya
	FW	Faraj Laheeb	3 October 1978 (aged 19)			(Kuwait Football Association) Al-Arabi

=== Syria ===
Head coach: (Romania) Mircea Rădulescu

No.	Pos.	Player	Date of birth (age)	Caps	Goals	Club
	GK	Salem Bitar	7 August 1973 (aged 25)			(Syrian Football Association) Al-Karamah
	GK	Abdulfatah Haj Abdulqader	2 August 1975 (aged 23)			(Syrian Football Association)
	DF	Tarek Jabban	11 December 1975 (aged 22)			(Syrian Football Association) Al-Jaish
	DF	Jihad Qassab	13 July 1975 (aged 23)			(Syrian Football Association) Al-Karamah
	DF	Hassan Abbas	24 January 1974 (aged 24)			(Syrian Football Association) Al-Karamah
	DF	Hussam Al Sayed	2 February 1972 (aged 26)			(Kuwait Football Association) Al-Yarmouk
	DF	Khaled Aryan				(Syrian Football Association) Al Ittihad Ahli
	MF	Salim Jablawi	30 November 1976 (aged 21)			(Lebanese Football Association) Al-Ahli
	MF	Ammar Rihawi	20 June 1975 (aged 23)			(Syrian Football Association) Al-Jaish
	MF	Nihad Bouchi	8 March 1973 (aged 25)			(Syrian Football Association) Al Ittihad Ahli
	MF	Abdelqader Al-Rifai	18 April 1973 (aged 25)			(Lebanese Football Association) Bourj
	FW	Al-Sayed Bayazid	20 January 1977 (aged 21)			(Syrian Football Association) Al-Jaish
	FW	Mahmoud Mahmalji	3 April 1976 (aged 22)			(Syrian Football Association) Al-Wahda
	FW	Ahmed Azzam	27 June 1977 (aged 21)			(Syrian Football Association) Al-Jaish

== Group C ==
=== Sudan ===
Head coach: Sharafeldin Ahmed Musa

No.	Pos.	Player	Date of birth (age)	Caps	Goals	Club
1	GK	Eisa Al-Hashmab	14 January 1965 (aged 33)	2	0	(Sudan Football Association) Al Ahli SC
5	DF	Mohamed Ataa "Aakif Ataa"	3 December 1975 (aged 22)	2	0	(Sudan Football Association) Al-Hilal Club
2	DF	Al-Sadig Mohamed	22 February 1974 (aged 24)	2	0	(Sudan Football Association) Al-Mourada SC
3	DF	Abdelrahim Barsham		2	0	(Sudan Football Association) Al-Mourada SC
4	DF	Al-Amin Yagoub		2	0	(Sudan Football Association)
7	MF	Hamed Kamal	1978	0	0	(Sudan Football Association) Al-Hilal Club
14	MF	Edward Jildo	10 February 1978 (aged 20)	2	0	(Sudan Football Association) Al-Merrikh SC
8	MF	Khalid Barsham		2	0	(Sudan Football Association) Al-Merrikh SC
20	MF	Najmeldin Hassan		2	0	(Sudan Football Association) Al-Merrikh SC
10	FW	Anas Al-Nour	8 September 1975 (aged 23)	2	2	(Sudan Football Association) Al-Hilal Club
18	FW	Khalid Bakhit		2	0	(Sudan Football Association) Al-Hilal Club
11	FW	Nemiri Ahmed Saeed		2	0	(Sudan Football Association) Al-Merrikh SC
9	FW	Abdelmajeed Jafar		2	1	(Sudan Football Association) Al-Merrikh SC

=== United Arab Emirates ===
Head coach: (Portugal) Carlos Queiroz

No.	Pos.	Player	Date of birth (age)	Caps	Goals	Club
	GK	Muhsin Musabah	1 October 1964 (aged 33)			(United Arab Emirates Football Association) Sharjah
	GK	Juma Rashed	12 December 1972 (aged 25)			(United Arab Emirates Football Association) Al Shabab
	DF	Kazem Ali Al-Balooshi	4 November 1978 (aged 19)			(United Arab Emirates Football Association) Al-Nasr
	DF	Fahad Ali Al-Shamsi	28 December 1976 (aged 21)			(United Arab Emirates Football Association) Al Ain
	DF	Mohamed Obaid Al-Zahiri	1 August 1967 (aged 31)			(United Arab Emirates Football Association) Al Ain
	DF	Hassan Mubarak	13 April 1968 (aged 30)			(United Arab Emirates Football Association) Al-Nasr
	DF	Ismail Rashid Ismail	27 October 1972 (aged 25)			(United Arab Emirates Football Association) Al Wasl
	DF	Adil Saleh Naseeb Al-Shehi	8 July 1974 (aged 24)			(United Arab Emirates Football Association) Al Jazira
	DF	Abdullah Essa Al-Falasi	6 May 1977 (aged 21)			(United Arab Emirates Football Association) Al Wasl
	MF	Abdulsalam Jumaa	23 May 1977 (aged 21)			(United Arab Emirates Football Association) Al Wahda
	MF	Gharib Hareb Farhan Al-Kuwaiti	7 February 1977 (aged 21)			(United Arab Emirates Football Association) Al Ain
	MF	Mohammed Ibrahim Al-Bloushi	22 June 1977 (aged 21)			(United Arab Emirates Football Association) Al-Nasr
	MF	Munther Ali Abdullah	12 January 1975 (aged 23)			(United Arab Emirates Football Association) Al Wasl
	MF	Hassan Saeed Ahmed	15 November 1973 (aged 24)			(United Arab Emirates Football Association) Al-Ittihad
	MF	Walid Obaid Al-Balooshi	12 March 1976 (aged 22)			(United Arab Emirates Football Association) Al Shabab
	MF	Saud Jassem Al-Doukhi	31 October 1977 (aged 20)			(United Arab Emirates Football Association) Sharjah
	MF	Mohamed Ali Kasla	12 December 1965 (aged 32)			(United Arab Emirates Football Association) Al-Nasr
	FW	Ali Hassan Ghawas	15 November 1973 (aged 24)			(United Arab Emirates Football Association) Al Wasl
	FW	Khamees Saad Mubarak	4 October 1970 (aged 27)			(United Arab Emirates Football Association) Al Shabab
	FW	Mohamed Jumaa Hamada				(United Arab Emirates Football Association) Shabab Al Ahli
	FW	Fahad Hassan Al-Nuwais				(United Arab Emirates Football Association) Al Ain

== Group D ==
=== Algeria U23 ===
Head coach: Meziane Ighil

No.	Pos.	Player	Date of birth (age)	Caps	Goals	Club
	GK	Slimane Ould Mata	8 September 1975 (aged 23)			(Algerian Football Federation) USM El Harrach
	DF	Kamel Bouacida	6 August 1976 (aged 22)			(Algerian Football Federation) USM Annaba
	DF	Kamel Habri	5 March 1976 (aged 22)			(Algerian Football Federation) WA Tlemcen
	DF	Moulay Haddou	14 June 1975 (aged 23)			(Algerian Football Federation) MC Oran
	DF	Kheïreddine Madoui	27 March 1977 (aged 21)			(Algerian Football Federation) ES Sétif
	MF	Laid Belhamel	12 November 1977 (aged 20)			(Algerian Football Federation) ES Sétif
	MF	Ali Bendebka	13 September 1976 (aged 22)			(Algerian Football Federation) NA Hussein Dey
	MF	Ismaïl Gana				(Algerian Football Federation) NA Hussein Dey
	MF	Zoheir Khadara				(Algerian Football Federation)
	MF	Sofiane Khiat				(Algerian Football Federation) MC Alger
	MF	Brahim Arafat Mezouar	18 December 1973 (aged 24)			(Algerian Football Federation) ASM Oran
	FW	Hocine Azzizene	21 August 1976 (aged 22)			(Algerian Football Federation) USM El Harrach
	FW	Farès El-Aouni	9 August 1977 (aged 21)			(Algerian Football Federation) WA Tlemcen
	FW	Moncef Ouichaoui	5 April 1977 (aged 21)			(Algerian Football Federation) USM Annaba

=== Lebanon ===
Head coach: (Egypt) Mahmoud Saad

No.	Pos.	Player	Date of birth (age)	Caps	Goals	Club
	GK	Ahmed Al-Saqr	7 April 1970 (aged 28)			(Lebanese Football Association) Homenmen
	DF	Daniel Al-Aawar				(Lebanese Football Association) Safa
	DF	Faisal Antar	20 December 1978 (aged 19)			(Lebanese Football Association) Tadamon Sour
	DF	Abbas Chahrour	1 January 1972 (aged 26)			(Lebanese Football Association) Nejmeh
	DF	Ahmad Al-Naamani	12 October 1979 (aged 18)			(Lebanese Football Association) Safa
	FW	Wartan Ghazarian	1 December 1969 (aged 28)			(Lebanese Football Association) Homenetmen
	MF	Jamal Taha	23 November 1978 (aged 19)			(Lebanese Football Association) Al Ansar
	MF	Roda Antar	12 September 1980 (aged 18)			(Lebanese Football Association) Tadamon Sour
	FW	Wael Nazha	26 March 1974 (aged 24)			(Lebanese Football Association) Tadamon Sour
	FW	Zaher Al-Indari	26 May 1971 (aged 27)			(Lebanese Football Association) Akhaa Ahli Aley
	FW	Walid Dahrouj	1965 (aged 32–33)			(Lebanese Football Association) Safa
	DF	Kevork Garabetian	15 December 1963 (aged 34)			(Lebanese Football Association) Al Ansar
	MF	Malek Hassoun	10 June 1975 (aged 23)			(Lebanese Football Association) Al Ansar
	GK	Ali Fakih	12 April 1967 (aged 31)			(Lebanese Football Association) Al Ansar
	MF	Moussa Hojeij	6 August 1974 (aged 24)			(Lebanese Football Association) Nejmeh
	MF	Fouad Hijazi	27 June 1973 (aged 25)			(Lebanese Football Association) Sagesse
	MF	Korken Yenkibarian	10 March 1964 (aged 34)			(Lebanese Football Association) Homenmen
	FW	Haitham Zein	6 January 1979 (aged 19)			(Lebanese Football Association) Tadamon Sour
	DF	Nabih Al-Jurdi	9 May 1967 (aged 31)			(Lebanese Football Association) Safa

=== Saudi Arabia ===
Head coach: (Germany) Otto Pfister

No.	Pos.	Player	Date of birth (age)	Caps	Goals	Club
1	GK	Mohamed Al-Deayea	2 August 1972 (aged 26)			(Saudi Arabian Football Federation) Al-Tai
2	DF	Mohammed Sheliah	28 September 1974 (aged 23)			(Saudi Arabian Football Federation) Al-Ahli
3	DF	Mohammed Al-Khilaiwi	21 August 1971 (aged 27)			(Saudi Arabian Football Federation) Al-Ittihad
4	DF	Abdullah Sulaiman	15 November 1973 (aged 24)			(Saudi Arabian Football Federation) Al-Ahli
5	DF	Ahmad Khaleel	10 April 1968 (aged 30)			(Saudi Arabian Football Federation) Al-Ettifaq
6	MF	Ibrahim Mater	10 July 1975 (aged 23)			(Saudi Arabian Football Federation) Al-Nassr
7	MF	Ibrahim Suwayed	21 July 1974 (aged 24)			(Saudi Arabian Football Federation) Al-Ahli
8	MF	Khalid Al-Temawi	19 April 1969 (aged 29)			(Saudi Arabian Football Federation) Al-Hilal
10	MF	Faisal Abu Thnain	1 January 1970 (aged 28)			(Saudi Arabian Football Federation) Al-Hilal
11	FW	Obeid Al-Dosari	2 October 1975 (aged 22)			(Saudi Arabian Football Federation) Al-Wehda
12	DF	Ahmed Al-Dokhi	25 October 1976 (aged 21)			(Saudi Arabian Football Federation) Al-Hilal
13	DF	Hussein Abdulghani	21 January 1977 (aged 21)			(Saudi Arabian Football Federation) Al-Ahli
14	MF	Saad Al-Dosari	17 June 1977 (aged 21)			(Saudi Arabian Football Federation) Al-Riyadh
15	MF	Yousuf Al-Thunayan	18 November 1963 (aged 34)			(Saudi Arabian Football Federation) Al-Hilal
16	MF	Khamis Al-Owairan	8 September 1973 (aged 25)			(Saudi Arabian Football Federation) Al-Hilal
18	MF	Nawaf Al-Temyat	28 June 1976 (aged 22)			(Saudi Arabian Football Federation) Al-Hilal
	GK	Turki Al-Awad	31 March 1973 (aged 25)			(Saudi Arabian Football Federation) Al-Hilal
	GK	Hussein Al-Sadiq	15 October 1973 (aged 24)			(Saudi Arabian Football Federation) Al-Ittihad
	DF	Mohsin al-Harthi	17 July 1976 (aged 22)			(Saudi Arabian Football Federation) Al-Nassr
	DF	Ibrahim Al-Showaie	30 June 1975 (aged 23)			(Saudi Arabian Football Federation) Al-Nassr
	FW	Mousa Saleh				(Saudi Arabian Football Federation) Al-Ansar
