= 2006 AFC Champions League =

25th edition of premier club football tournament organized by the AFC

Tournament details
- Dates: 8 March - 8 November 2006
- Teams: 25

Final positions
- Champions: (South Korea) Jeonbuk Hyundai Motors (1st title)
- Runners-up: (Syria) Al-Karamah

Tournament statistics
- Matches played: 78
- Goals scored: 250 (3.21 per match)
- Top scorer(s): Magno Alves (8 goals)
- Best player: Choi Jin-cheul

The 2006 AFC Champions League was the 25th edition of the top-level Asian club football tournament and the fourth edition under the current AFC Champions League title. Al-Ittihad automatically qualified for the quarter-finals as the title holders.

Jeonbuk Hyundai Motors won their first AFC Champions League title after beating Al-Karamah 3–2 on aggregate in the final. Jeonbuk also became the first team in history of Asia to have won the Champions League before the national league title (they won their first K League championship three years later, in 2009).

== Format ==
Group stage

A total of 28 clubs were divided into seven groups of four, (Note: As two clubs from Group F and two clubs from Group G were disqualified, the remaining clubs in these groups played each other home and away.) according to the region. Each club played double round-robin (home and away) against fellow three group members for a total of six matches. Clubs received three points for a win, one for a tie, and no points for a loss. The clubs were ranked according to points. If two or more teams were tied on points, the following tiebreaking criteria were applied:

- Points earned between the clubs in question
- Goal difference between the clubs in question
- Goals for between the clubs in question
- Points earned within the group
- Goal difference within the group
- Goals for within the group

The seven group winners along with the defending champion advanced to the quarter-finals.

Knockout round

All 8 clubs were randomly matched; however, the only restriction was that the clubs from the same country could not face each other in the quarter-finals. The games were played over two legs, home and away, and the aggregate score decided the winner. If the aggregate score was level, the away goals rule was used. If still tied, clubs played extra time, where the away goals rule still applied. If still tied, the game went to penalties.

== Teams ==
| West Asia | | East Asia | |
Quarter-finals
| Team | Qualifying method | Team | Qualifying method |
|---|---|---|---|
| (Saudi Arabia) Al-Ittihad | Defending champions | | |
Group Stage
| Team | Qualifying method | Team | Qualifying method |
| (Iran) Foolad | 2004–05 Iran Pro League champions | (China) Dalian Shide | 2005 Chinese Super League champions & 2005 Chinese FA Cup winners |
| (Iran) Saba Battery | 2004–05 Hazfi Cup winners and 2005 Iranian Super Cup winners | (China) Shanghai Shenhua | 2005 Chinese Super League runners-up |
| (Iraq) Al-Quwa Al-Jawiya | 2004–05 Iraqi Premier League champions | (Indonesia) ~~Persipura Jayapura~~ | 2005 Liga Indonesia Premier Division champions |
| (Iraq) Al-Minaa | 2004–05 Iraqi Premier League runners-up | (Indonesia) ~~Arema Malang~~ | 2005 Copa Indonesia winners |
| (Kuwait) Al Qadisiya | 2004–05 Kuwaiti Premier League champions | (Japan) Gamba Osaka | 2005 J.League Division 1 champions |
| (Kuwait) Al-Arabi | 2005 Kuwait Emir Cup winners | (Japan) Tokyo Verdy 1969 | 2004 Emperor's Cup winners |
| (Qatar) Al-Gharafa | 2004–05 Qatar Stars League champions | (South Korea) Ulsan Hyundai Horang-i | 2005 K League champions |
| (Qatar) Al Sadd | 2004–05 Emir of Qatar Cup winners | (South Korea) Jeonbuk Hyundai Motors | 2005 Korean FA Cup winners |
| (Saudi Arabia) Al Hilal | 2004–05 Saudi Premier League champions & 2004–05 Saudi Crown Prince Cup winners | (Thailand) ~~TTM FC~~ | 2004–05 Thai League champions |
| (Saudi Arabia) Al Shabab | 2004–05 Saudi Premier League runners-up | (Thailand) ~~PEA FC~~ | 2004–05 Thai League runners-up |
| (Syria) Al-Ittihad | 2004–05 Syrian Premier League champions & 2004-05 Syrian Cup winners | (Vietnam) Đồng Tâm Long An | 2005 V-League champions & 2005 Vietnamese Cup winners |
| (Syria) Al-Karamah | 2004–05 Syrian Premier League runners-up | (Vietnam) Da Nang | 2005 V-League runners-up |
| (United Arab Emirates) Al Wahda | 2004–05 UAE Football League champions | | |
| (United Arab Emirates) Al Ain | 2004–05 UAE President's Cup winners | | |
| (Uzbekistan) Pakhtakor | 2005 Uzbek League champions & 2005 Uzbekistan Cup winners | | |
| (Uzbekistan) Mash'al | 2005 Uzbek League runners-up | | |

Notes

1. The two clubs from Indonesia (Persipura Jayapura and Arema Malang) and the two clubs from Thailand (TTM FC and PEA FC) were disqualified from the competition by the AFC for failing to submit their player registration forms in time. Consequently, Groups F and G only have two teams each.

== Group stage ==
=== Group A ===
| Team | Pld | W | D | L | GF | GA | GD | Pts |
|---|---|---|---|---|---|---|---|---|
| (Kuwait) Al Qadisiya | 6 | 3 | 2 | 1 | 9 | 11 | −2 | 11 |
| (Uzbekistan) Pakhtakor | 6 | 3 | 1 | 2 | 11 | 7 | +4 | 10 |
| (Syria) Al-Ittihad | 6 | 2 | 2 | 2 | 6 | 7 | −1 | 8 |
| (Iran) Foolad | 6 | 1 | 1 | 4 | 8 | 9 | −1 | 4 |

8 March 2006

| Foolad (Iran) | 6–0 | (Kuwait) Al Qadisiya |
|---|---|---|
| Rameshgar 10'; Soleimani 27'; Badavi 34'; Khaziravi 54'; Ahmadi 59'; Montazeri 72' |

Shahid Dastgerdi Stadium, Tehran
Attendance: 7,000
8 March 2006

| Pakhtakor (Uzbekistan) | 2–0 | (Syria) Al-Ittihad |
|---|---|---|
| Inomov 16'; Kletskov 85' |

Pakhtakor Markaziy Stadium, Tashkent
Attendance: 32,000

22 March 2006

| Al-Ittihad (Syria) | 0–0 | (Iran) Foolad |

Al Hamadania Stadium, Aleppo
22 March 2006

| Al Qadisiya (Kuwait) | 2–1 | (Uzbekistan) Pakhtakor |
|---|---|---|
| Al-Otaibi 87'; Al-Mutawa 90' | | Soliev 45' |

Mohammed Al-Hamad Stadium, Kuwait City
Attendance: 3,500

12 April 2006

| Pakhtakor (Uzbekistan) | 2–0 | (Iran) Foolad |
|---|---|---|
| Tadjiyev 13'; Djeparov 37' |

Pakhtakor Markaziy Stadium, Tashkent
Attendance: 12,000
13 April 2006

| Al-Ittihad (Syria) | 2–2 | (Kuwait) Al Qadisiya |
|---|---|---|
| Homsi 23'; Al Agha 83' | | Al-Mutawa 20' (pen.); Tarab 90' (o.g.) |

Al Hamadania Stadium, Aleppo

26 April 2006

| Foolad (Iran) | 1–3 | (Uzbekistan) Pakhtakor |
|---|---|---|
| Soleimani 34' | | Bayramov 46'; Kiryan 48'; Tadjiyev 57' |

Shahid Dastgerdi Stadium, Tehran
Attendance: 4,000
27 April 2006

| Al Qadisiya (Kuwait) | 1–0 | (Syria) Al-Ittihad |
|---|---|---|
| Al-Mutawa 83' |

Mohammed Al-Hamad Stadium, Kuwait City
Attendance: 7,000

4 May 2006

| Al Qadisiya (Kuwait) | 2–0 | (Iran) Foolad |
|---|---|---|
| Al-Mutawa 3', 90+3' (pen.) |

Mohammed Al-Hamad Stadium, Kuwait City
4 May 2006

| Al-Ittihad (Syria) | 2–1 | (Uzbekistan) Pakhtakor |
|---|---|---|
| Al Rashad 17'; Al Damen 45+2' | | Ponomarev 20' |

Al Hamadania Stadium, Aleppo

17 May 2006

| Pakhtakor (Uzbekistan) | 2–2 | (Kuwait) Al Qadisiya |
|---|---|---|
| Bayramov 12'; Soliev 90' | | Fadhel 7'; Al-Salamah 58' |

Pakhtakor Markaziy Stadium, Tashkent
Attendance: 18,000
17 May 2006

| Foolad (Iran) | 1–2 | (Syria) Al-Ittihad |
|---|---|---|
| Kolahkaj 77' | | Al Damen 21'; Boudaka 73' |

Shahid Dastgerdi Stadium, Tehran
Attendance: 500

=== Group B ===
| Team | Pld | W | D | L | GF | GA | GD | Pts |
|---|---|---|---|---|---|---|---|---|
| (United Arab Emirates) Al Ain | 6 | 4 | 1 | 1 | 10 | 6 | +4 | 13 |
| (Saudi Arabia) Al-Hilal | 6 | 3 | 1 | 2 | 12 | 7 | +5 | 10 |
| (Uzbekistan) Mash'al | 6 | 2 | 2 | 2 | 7 | 11 | −4 | 8 |
| (Iraq) Al-Minaa | 6 | 0 | 2 | 4 | 6 | 11 | −5 | 2 |

Source: afcchampionsleague.com
8 March 2006

| Al-Minaa (Iraq) | 0–1 | (Uzbekistan) Mash'al |
|---|---|---|
| | | Kholmurodov 31' |

Sabah Al Salem Stadium, Kuwait City
Attendance: 100
8 March 2006

| Al Ain (United Arab Emirates) | 2–0 | (Saudi Arabia) Al-Hilal |
|---|---|---|
| Ali 42'; Kelly 49' |

Tahnoun Bin Mohamed Stadium, Al Ain
Attendance: 12,500

22 March 2006

| Mash'al (Uzbekistan) | 1–1 | (United Arab Emirates) Al Ain |
|---|---|---|
| Mirholdirshaev 90+4' | | Diaky 15' |

Markaziy Stadium, Karshi
Attendance: 10,000
23 March 2006

| Al-Hilal (Saudi Arabia) | 3–1 | (Iraq) Al-Minaa |
|---|---|---|
| Tavares 31'; Aoda 60' (o.g.); Al-Qahtani 90' | | Hamoud 45' |

King Fahd II Stadium, Riyadh
Attendance: 30,000

12 April 2006

| Al Ain (United Arab Emirates) | 2–1 | (Iraq) Al-Minaa |
|---|---|---|
| Jestrović 14', 33' (pen.) | | Jabbar 15' |

Tahnoun Bin Mohamed Stadium, Al Ain
Attendance: 9,000
13 April 2006

| Al-Hilal (Saudi Arabia) | 5–0 | (Uzbekistan) Mash'al |
|---|---|---|
| Al-Mouri 30'; Giovanni 34'; Al-Swaileh 63'; Camacho 79'; Al-Shalhoub 85' |

King Fahd II Stadium, Riyadh
Attendance: 27,000

26 April 2006

| Mash'al (Uzbekistan) | 2–1 | (Saudi Arabia) Al-Hilal |
|---|---|---|
| Karaev 50'; Kholmurodov 82' | | Al-Dosari 90+2' |

Markaziy Stadium, Karshi
Attendance: 6,000
27 April 2006

| Al-Minaa (Iraq) | 1–2 | (United Arab Emirates) Al Ain |
|---|---|---|
| Falah 7' | | Kelly 64' (pen.); Diaky 66' |

Mohammed Al-Hamad Stadium, Hawally
Attendance: 250

3 May 2006

| Mash'al (Uzbekistan) | 2–2 | (Iraq) Al-Minaa |
|---|---|---|
| Hasanov 30'; Mirholdirshaev 72' | | Abdulkazem 12'; Abdulsattar 60' |

Markaziy Stadium, Karshi
Attendance: 3,000
4 May 2006

| Al-Hilal (Saudi Arabia) | 2–1 | (United Arab Emirates) Al Ain |
|---|---|---|
| Camacho 33'; Al-Shalhoub 86' (pen.) | | Jestrović 49' |

King Fahd II Stadium, Riyadh
Attendance: 60,000

17 May 2006

| Al Ain (United Arab Emirates) | 2–1 | (Uzbekistan) Mash'al |
|---|---|---|
| Jestrović 35', 45' | | Kholmurodov 23' |

Tahnoun Bin Mohamed Stadium, Al Ain
Attendance: 7,000
17 May 2006

| Al-Minaa (Iraq) | 1–1 | (Saudi Arabia) Al-Hilal |
|---|---|---|
| Falah 34' | | Giovanni 48' |

Sabah Al Salem Stadium, Kuwait City
Attendance: 200

=== Group C ===
| Team | Pld | W | D | L | GF | GA | GD | Pts |
|---|---|---|---|---|---|---|---|---|
| (Syria) Al-Karamah | 6 | 4 | 0 | 2 | 10 | 11 | −1 | 12 |
| (Iran) Saba Battery | 6 | 3 | 1 | 2 | 13 | 8 | +5 | 10 |
| (United Arab Emirates) Al-Wahda | 6 | 2 | 1 | 3 | 14 | 15 | −1 | 7 |
| (Qatar) Al-Gharafa | 6 | 2 | 0 | 4 | 11 | 14 | −3 | 6 |

8 March 2006

| Al Gharafa (Qatar) | 0–2 | (Iran) Saba Battery |
|---|---|---|
| | | Daei 47', 52' |

Al-Gharrafa Stadium, Doha
Attendance: 350
9 March 2006
18:00 UTC+02:00

| Al-Karamah (Syria) | 2–1 | (United Arab Emirates) Al-Wahda |
|---|---|---|
| Al Hamwi 45+2'; Turkmani 86' | | Matar 13' |

Khalid ibn al-Walid Stadium, Homs
Attendance: 30,000

22 March 2006
14:30 UTC+02:00

| Saba Battery (Iran) | 1–2 | (Syria) Al-Karamah |
|---|---|---|
| Daei 16' | | Al-Hussain 63'; Ibrahim 90' |

Derakhshan Stadium, Robat Karim
Attendance: 7,000
22 March 2006

| Al-Wahda (United Arab Emirates) | 2–0 | (Qatar) Al Gharafa |
|---|---|---|
| Matar 27'; Maurito 45' |

Al Nahyan Stadium, Abu Dhabi
Attendance: 10,000

12 April 2006
18:30 UTC+03:00

| Al Gharafa (Qatar) | 4–0 | (Syria) Al-Karamah |
|---|---|---|
| Hubail 59' (pen.), 71'; Ali 81'; Quaye 89' |

Al-Gharrafa Stadium, Doha
Attendance: 500
12 April 2006

| Saba Battery (Iran) | 2–2 | (United Arab Emirates) Al-Wahda |
|---|---|---|
| Ghasemian 24'; Akbari 27' | | Maurito 60'; Mitrović 62' |

Derakhshan Stadium, Robat Karim
Attendance: 6,000

26 April 2006

| Al-Wahda (United Arab Emirates) | 2–4 | (Iran) Saba Battery |
|---|---|---|
| Golmohammadi 40' (o.g.); Masoud 86' | | Avdić 29'; Beigi 33', 52'; Bakhtiarizadeh 48' |

Al Nahyan Stadium, Abu Dhabi
Attendance: 7,000
27 April 2006
19:00 UTC+02:00

| Al-Karamah (Syria) | 3–1 | (Qatar) Al Gharafa |
|---|---|---|
| Turkmani 67', 74'; Rifai 83' (pen.) | | El Assas 65' |

Khalid ibn al-Walid Stadium, Homs
Attendance: 5,000

3 May 2006

| Saba Battery (Iran) | 4–1 | (Qatar) Al Gharafa |
|---|---|---|
| Avdić 72'; Daei 77', 83'; Golmohammadi 90' | | Al-Mazroui 55' |

Derakhshan Stadium, Robat Karim
Attendance: 3,000
3 May 2006
19:40 UTC+04:00

| Al-Wahda (United Arab Emirates) | 4–2 | (Syria) Al-Karamah |
|---|---|---|
| Ameen 19'; Abdul Razzaq 21'; Ahmed 64'; Al Menhali 84' | | Rifai 31' (pen.); Jenyat 40' |

Al Nahyan Stadium, Abu Dhabi

17 May 2006

| Al Gharafa (Qatar) | 5–3 | (United Arab Emirates) Al-Wahda |
|---|---|---|
| Hubail 23', 66', 73'; Al Shammari 29'; Sergio 72' (pen.) | | Ameen 16'; Al Menhali 60', 89' |

Al-Gharrafa Stadium, Doha
Attendance: 350
17 May 2006
19:00 UTC+02:00

| Al-Karamah (Syria) | 1–0 | (Iran) Saba Battery |
|---|---|---|
| Rifai 31' |

Khalid ibn al-Walid Stadium, Homs
Attendance: 35,000

=== Group D ===
| Team | Pld | W | D | L | GF | GA | GD | Pts |
|---|---|---|---|---|---|---|---|---|
| (Saudi Arabia) Al-Shabab | 6 | 4 | 1 | 1 | 9 | 6 | +3 | 13 |
| (Qatar) Al Sadd | 6 | 4 | 1 | 1 | 13 | 5 | +8 | 13 |
| (Iraq) Al-Quwa Al-Jawiya | 6 | 2 | 0 | 4 | 5 | 9 | −4 | 6 |
| (Kuwait) Al-Arabi | 6 | 1 | 0 | 5 | 5 | 12 | −7 | 3 |

8 March 2006

| Al-Arabi (Kuwait) | 0–1 | (Iraq) Al-Quwa Al-Jawiya |
|---|---|---|
| | | Abdul-Ghani 76' |

Sabah Al Salem Stadium, Kuwait City
Attendance: 2,500
9 March 2006

| Al-Shabab (Saudi Arabia) | 0–0 | (Qatar) Al Sadd |

King Fahd International Stadium, Riyadh

22 March 2006

| Al-Quwa Al-Jawiya (Iraq) | 0–2 | (Saudi Arabia) Al-Shabab |
|---|---|---|
| | | Attram 36', 45' |

Tripoli Municipal Stadium, Tripoli
22 March 2006

| Al Sadd (Qatar) | 4–1 | (Kuwait) Al-Arabi |
|---|---|---|
| Ibrahim 32'; Tenorio 51' (pen.); Al-Kuwari 62'; Ahmed 73' | | Al-Khatib 48' |

Al-Sadd Sports Club, Doha
Attendance: 3,500

12 April 2006

| Al-Quwa Al-Jawiya (Iraq) | 0–2 | (Qatar) Al Sadd |
|---|---|---|
| | | Tenorio 58'; Mohamed 87' |

Tripoli Municipal Stadium, Tripoli
12 April 2006

| Al-Arabi (Kuwait) | 3–0 | (Saudi Arabia) Al-Shabab |
|---|---|---|
| Al-Khatib 21', 87'; Jarragh 68' |

Sabah Al Salem Stadium, Kuwait City
Attendance: 1,000

26 April 2006

| Al Sadd (Qatar) | 3–0 | (Iraq) Al-Quwa Al-Jawiya |
|---|---|---|
| Al-Kuwari 23'; Felipe 83'; Mohamed 90' |

Al-Sadd Sports Club, Doha
Attendance: 1,200
27 April 2006

| Al-Shabab (Saudi Arabia) | 2–0 | (Kuwait) Al-Arabi |
|---|---|---|
| Al-Shamrani 11'; Attram 13' |

King Fahd International Stadium, Riyadh
Attendance: 5,000

3 May 2006

| Al-Quwa Al-Jawiya (Iraq) | 3–0 | (Kuwait) Al-Arabi |
|---|---|---|
| Abdul-Ghani 31', 45'; Kathem 74' |

Tripoli Municipal Stadium, Tripoli
Attendance: 100
4 May 2006

| Al Sadd (Qatar) | 2–3 | (Saudi Arabia) Al-Shabab |
|---|---|---|
| Tenorio 83', 90' | | Akram 22'; Al-Shamrani 39'; Attram 56' |

Al-Sadd Sports Club, Doha
Attendance: 2,000

17 May 2006

| Al-Arabi (Kuwait) | 1–2 | (Qatar) Al Sadd |
|---|---|---|
| Al Qhareeb 34' | | Felipe 63'; Ahmed 79' |

Sabah Al Salem Stadium, Kuwait City
Attendance: 350
17 May 2006

| Al-Shabab (Saudi Arabia) | 2–1 | (Iraq) Al-Quwa Al-Jawiya |
|---|---|---|
| Al-Shamrani 41'; Akram 69' | | Khodair 35' |

King Fahd International Stadium, Riyadh
Attendance: 3,000

=== Group E ===
| Team | Pld | W | D | L | GF | GA | GD | Pts |
|---|---|---|---|---|---|---|---|---|
| (South Korea) Jeonbuk Hyundai Motors | 6 | 4 | 1 | 1 | 11 | 5 | +6 | 13 |
| (China) Dalian Shide | 6 | 4 | 0 | 2 | 7 | 6 | +1 | 12 |
| (Japan) Gamba Osaka | 6 | 3 | 1 | 2 | 26 | 7 | +19 | 10 |
| (Vietnam) Da Nang | 6 | 0 | 0 | 6 | 1 | 27 | −26 | 0 |

8 March 2006
16:00 UTC+07:00

| Da Nang (Vietnam) | 0–2 | (China) Dalian Shide |
|---|---|---|
| | | Zou Jie 40'; Ji Mingyi 48' |

Chi Lăng Stadium, Da Nang
Attendance: 20,000
8 March 2006

| Jeonbuk Hyundai Motors (South Korea) | 3–2 | (Japan) Gamba Osaka |
|---|---|---|
| Milton 29'; Kim Hyeung-bum 70', 84' | | Endō 15'; Magno Alves 59' |

Jeonju World Cup Stadium, Jeonju
Attendance: 2,700

22 March 2006
14:30 UTC+08:00

| Dalian Shide (China) | 1–0 | (South Korea) Jeonbuk Hyundai Motors |
|---|---|---|
| Zou Jie 40' |

Jinzhou Stadium, Dalian
Attendance: 21,000
22 March 2006

| Gamba Osaka (Japan) | 15–0 | (Vietnam) Da Nang |
|---|---|---|
| Endō 8' (pen.); Fernandinho 20', 21', 37', 78'; Bando 24'; Magno Alves 42', 49', 70', 86'; Maeda 77', 80'; Miyamoto 82'; Hashimoto 85'; Ienaga 90' |

Osaka Expo '70 Stadium, Osaka
Attendance: 3,832

12 April 2006

| Jeonbuk Hyundai Motors (South Korea) | 3–0 | (Vietnam) Da Nang |
|---|---|---|
| Milton 23'; Kim Hyeung-bum 40'; Botti 80' |

Jeonju World Cup Stadium, Jeonju
Attendance: 748
12 April 2006
19:00 UTC+09:00

| Gamba Osaka (Japan) | 3–0 | (China) Dalian Shide |
|---|---|---|
| Endō 48' (pen.); Magno Alves 56', 71' |

Osaka Expo '70 Stadium, Osaka
Attendance: 5,555

26 April 2006

| Da Nang (Vietnam) | 0–1 | (South Korea) Jeonbuk Hyundai Motors |
|---|---|---|
| | | Zé Carlos 21' |

Chi Lăng Stadium, Da Nang
Attendance: 2,000
26 April 2006
19:00 UTC+08:00

| Dalian Shide (China) | 2–0 | (Japan) Gamba Osaka |
|---|---|---|
| Zou Jie 19'; Zhang Yaokun 48' |

Jinzhou Stadium, Dalian
Attendance: 10,000

3 May 2006

| Gamba Osaka (Japan) | 1–1 | (South Korea) Jeonbuk Hyundai Motors |
|---|---|---|
| Yamaguchi 73' | | Cho Jin-soo 45' |

Osaka Expo '70 Stadium, Osaka
Attendance: 12,470
3 May 2006
19:00 UTC+08:00

| Dalian Shide (China) | 1–0 | (Vietnam) Da Nang |
|---|---|---|
| Liu Cheng 4' |

Jinzhou Stadium, Dalian
Attendance: 12,000

17 May 2006

| Da Nang (Vietnam) | 1–5 | (Japan) Gamba Osaka |
|---|---|---|
| Nguyễn Rogério 72' (pen.) | | Fernandinho 21', 45'; Magno Alves 36'; Futagawa 53'; Yamaguchi 75' |

Chi Lăng Stadium, Da Nang
Attendance: 1,000
17 May 2006
19:00 UTC+09:00

| Jeonbuk Hyundai Motors (South Korea) | 3–1 | (China) Dalian Shide |
|---|---|---|
| Kim Hyeung-bum 66', 88'; Wang Jung-hyun 81' | | Zou Jie 58' |

Jeonju World Cup Stadium, Jeonju
Attendance: 5,400

=== Group F ===
| Team | Pld | W | D | L | GF | GA | GD | Pts |
|---|---|---|---|---|---|---|---|---|
| (South Korea) Ulsan Hyundai Horang-i | 2 | 2 | 0 | 0 | 3 | 0 | +3 | 6 |
| (Japan) Tokyo Verdy 1969 | 2 | 0 | 0 | 2 | 0 | 3 | −3 | 0 |
| (Thailand) TTM FC | 0 | 0 | 0 | 0 | 0 | 0 | 0 | 0 (Note: TTM FC and Arema Malang were disqualified for failing to fill in their player registration forms in time.) |
| (Indonesia) Arema Malang | 0 | 0 | 0 | 0 | 0 | 0 | 0 | 0 |

Notes:
8 March 2006

| Tokyo Verdy 1969 (Japan) | 0–2 | (South Korea) Ulsan Hyundai Horang-i |
|---|---|---|
| | | Choi Sung-kuk 57'; Machado 71' |

National Stadium, Tokyo
Attendance: 18,000
3 May 2006

| Ulsan Hyundai Horang-i (South Korea) | 1–0 | (Japan) Tokyo Verdy 1969 |
|---|---|---|
| Lee Chun-soo 43' |

Munsu Cup Stadium, Ulsan
Attendance: 3,150

=== Group G ===
| Team | Pld | W | D | L | GF | GA | GD | Pts |
|---|---|---|---|---|---|---|---|---|
| (China) Shanghai Shenhua | 2 | 2 | 0 | 0 | 7 | 3 | +4 | 6 |
| (Vietnam) Đồng Tâm Long An | 2 | 0 | 0 | 2 | 3 | 7 | −4 | 0 |
| (Indonesia) Persipura Jayapura | 0 | 0 | 0 | 0 | 0 | 0 | 0 | 0 (Note: Persipura Jayapura and PEA FC were disqualified for failing to fill in their player registration forms in time.) |
| (Thailand) PEA FC | 0 | 0 | 0 | 0 | 0 | 0 | 0 | 0 |

Notes:
8 March 2006
19:35 UTC+08:00

| Shanghai Shenhua (China) | 3–1 | (Vietnam) Đồng Tâm Long An |
|---|---|---|
| Wang Ke 6'; Xie Hui 11', 51' | | Antônio Carlos 65' (pen.) |

Yuanshen Sports Centre Stadium, Shanghai
Attendance: 18,000
3 May 2006
16:00 UTC+07:00

| Đồng Tâm Long An (Vietnam) | 2–4 | (China) Shanghai Shenhua |
|---|---|---|
| Antônio Carlos 29'; Santos 62' | | Gao Lin 45', 90', 90+1'; Yu Tao 65' |

Long An Stadium, Long An
Attendance: 3,000

== Knock-out stage ==
=== Bracket ===
Quarter finals
(China) Shanghai Shenhua | 1 | 2 | 3
(South Korea) Jeonbuk Hyundai Motors | 0 | 4 | 4
(South Korea) Ulsan Hyundai Horang-i | 6 | 1 | 7
(Saudi Arabia) Al-Shabab | 0 | 0 | 0
(Saudi Arabia) Al-Ittihad | 2 | 0 | 2
(Syria) Al-Karamah (a.e.t.) | 0 | 4 | 4
(Kuwait) Al Qadisiya | 2 | 3 | 5
(United Arab Emirates) Al Ain | 2 | 0 | 2

Semi-finals
(South Korea) Jeonbuk Hyundai Motors | 2 | 4 | 6
(South Korea) Ulsan Hyundai Horang-i | 3 | 1 | 4
(Syria) Al-Karamah | 0 | 1 | 1
(Kuwait) Al Qadisiya | 0 | 0 | 0

Final
(South Korea) Jeonbuk Hyundai Motors | 2 | 1 | 3
(Syria) Al-Karamah | 0 | 2 | 2

=== Quarter-finals ===
| Team 1 | Agg. | Team 2 | 1st leg | 2nd leg |
|---|---|---|---|---|
| Ulsan Hyundai Horang-i (South Korea) | 7–0 | (Saudi Arabia) Al-Shabab | 6–0 | 1–0 |
| Shanghai Shenhua (China) | 3–4 | (South Korea) Jeonbuk Hyundai Motors | 1–0 | 2–4 |
| Al Qadisiya (Kuwait) | 5–2 | (United Arab Emirates) Al Ain | 2–2 | 3–0 |
| Al-Ittihad (2005 Champion) (Saudi Arabia) | 2–4 | (Syria) Al-Karamah | 2–0 | 0–4 (a.e.t.) |

==== First leg ====
13 September 2006

| Ulsan Hyundai Horang-i (South Korea) | 6–0 | (Saudi Arabia) Al-Shabab |
|---|---|---|
| Lee Chun-soo 22'; Lee Sang-ho 28'; Choi Sung-kuk 35', 78'; Leandrão 69'; Machado 87' |

Munsu Cup Stadium, Ulsan
Attendance: 3,873

13 September 2006

| Shanghai Shenhua (China) | 1–0 | (South Korea) Jeonbuk Hyundai Motors |
|---|---|---|
| Gao Lin 32' |

Yuanshen Sports Centre Stadium, Shanghai
Attendance: 5,000

13 September 2006

| Al Qadisiya (Kuwait) | 2–2 | (United Arab Emirates) Al Ain |
|---|---|---|
| Al-Salamah 45', 48' | | Jestrović 23'; Dodô 66' |

Mohammed Al-Hamad Stadium, Kuwait City
Attendance: 9,000

13 September 2006

| Al-Ittihad (Saudi Arabia) | 2–0 | (Syria) Al-Karamah |
|---|---|---|
| Keita 43'; Borgetti 46' |

Prince Abdullah al-Faisal Stadium, Jeddah
Attendance: 20,000

==== Second leg ====
20 September 2006

| Jeonbuk Hyundai Motors (South Korea) | 4–2 | (China) Shanghai Shenhua |
|---|---|---|
| Zé Carlos 44', 61'; Yeom Ki-hun 69'; Jung Jong-kwan 78' | | Gao Lin 35'; Jancker 89' |

Jeonju World Cup Stadium, Jeonju
Attendance: 9,000

Jeonbuk Hyundai Motors won 4–3 on aggregate.

20 September 2006

| Al Ain (United Arab Emirates) | 0–3 | (Kuwait) Al Qadisiya |
|---|---|---|
| | | Bashir 25', 90'; Al-Hinai 90+3' |

Tahnoun Bin Mohamed Stadium, Al Ain
Attendance: 10,000

Al Qadisiya won 5–2 on aggregate.

20 September 2006

| Al-Shabab (Saudi Arabia) | 0–1 | (South Korea) Ulsan Hyundai Horang-i |
|---|---|---|
| | | Park Dong-hyuk 49' |

King Fahd International Stadium, Riyadh
Attendance: 2,000

Ulsan Hyundai Horang-i won 7–0 on aggregate.

20 September 2006

| Al-Karamah (Syria) | 4–0 (a.e.t.) | (Saudi Arabia) Al-Ittihad |
|---|---|---|
| Mando 41'; Omaier 49'; Ibrahim 104', 110' |

Khalid ibn al-Walid Stadium, Homs
Attendance: 25,000

Al-Karamah won 4–2 on aggregate.

=== Semi-finals ===
| Team 1 | Agg. | Team 2 | 1st leg | 2nd leg |
|---|---|---|---|---|
| Jeonbuk Hyundai Motors (South Korea) | 6–4 | (South Korea) Ulsan Hyundai Horang-i | 2–3 | 4–1 |
| Al-Karamah (Syria) | 1–0 | (Kuwait) Al Qadisiya | 0–0 | 1–0 |

==== First leg ====
27 September 2006

| Jeonbuk Hyundai Motors (South Korea) | 2–3 | (South Korea) Ulsan Hyundai Horang-i |
|---|---|---|
| Zé Carlos 26' (pen.); Yeom Ki-hun 46' | | Yoo Kyoung-youl 6'; Vinícius 37'; Choi Sung-kuk 82' |

Jeonju World Cup Stadium, Jeonju
Attendance: 12,473

27 September 2006

| Al-Karamah (Syria) | 0–0 | (Kuwait) Al Qadisiya |

Khalid ibn al-Walid Stadium, Homs
Attendance: 35,000

==== Second leg ====
18 October 2006

| Ulsan Hyundai Horang-i (South Korea) | 1–4 | (South Korea) Jeonbuk Hyundai Motors |
|---|---|---|
| Lee Chun-soo 70' | | Choi Jin-cheul 10'; Jung Jong-kwan 20'; Lim You-hwan 68'; Lee Kwang-hyun 81' |

Munsu Cup Stadium, Ulsan
Attendance: 15,836

Jeonbuk Hyundai Motors won 6–4 on aggregate.

18 October 2006

| Al Qadisiya (Kuwait) | 0–1 | (Syria) Al-Karamah |
|---|---|---|
| | | Jenyat 15' |

Al-Sadaqua Walsalam Stadium, Kuwait City
Attendance: 20,000

Al-Karamah won 1–0 on aggregate.

=== Final ===
| Team 1 | Agg. | Team 2 | 1st leg | 2nd leg |
|---|---|---|---|---|
| Jeonbuk Hyundai Motors (South Korea) | 3–2 | (Syria) Al-Karamah | 2–0 | 1–2 |

==== First leg ====
1 November 2006

| Jeonbuk Hyundai Motors (South Korea) | 2–0 | (Syria) Al-Karamah |
|---|---|---|
| Yeom Ki-hun 59'; Botti 90+1' |

Jeonju World Cup Stadium, Jeonju
Attendance: 25,830

==== Second leg ====
8 November 2006

| Al-Karamah (Syria) | 2–1 | (South Korea) Jeonbuk Hyundai Motors |
|---|---|---|
| Mando 54'; Ibrahim 61' | | Zé Carlos 86' |

Khalid ibn al-Walid Stadium, Homs
Attendance: 40,000

Jeonbuk Hyundai Motors won 3–2 on aggregate.

== Top scorers ==
Team eliminated / inactive for this round.

| Rank | Player | Club | MD1 | MD2 | MD3 | MD4 | MD5 | MD6 | QF1 | QF2 | SF1 | SF2 | F1 | F2 | Total |
|---|---|---|---|---|---|---|---|---|---|---|---|---|---|---|---|
| 1 | (Brazil) Magno Alves | (Japan) Gamba Osaka | 1 | 4 | 2 | | | 1 | | | | | | | 8 |
| 2 | (Brazil) Fernandinho | (Japan) Gamba Osaka | | 4 | | | | 2 | | | | | | | 6 |
| 2 | (Serbia) Nenad Jestrović | (United Arab Emirates) Al Ain | | | 2 | | 1 | 2 | 1 | | | | | | 6 |
| 4 | (Iran) Ali Daei | (Iran) Saba Battery | 2 | 1 | | | 2 | | | | | | | | 5 |
| 4 | (China) Gao Lin | (China) Shanghai Shenhua | | | | | 3 | | 1 | 1 | | | | | 5 |
| 4 | (Bahrain) A'ala Hubail | (Qatar) Al-Gharafa | | | 2 | | | 3 | | | | | | | 5 |
| 4 | (South Korea) Kim Hyeung-bum | (South Korea) Jeonbuk Hyundai Motors | 2 | | 1 | | | 2 | | | | | | | 5 |
| 4 | (Kuwait) Bader Al-Mutawa | (Kuwait) Al Qadisiya | | 1 | 1 | 1 | 2 | | | | | | | | 5 |
| 4 | (Brazil) Zé Carlos | (South Korea) Jeonbuk Hyundai Motors | | | | 1 | | | | 2 | 1 | | | 1 | 5 |
| 10 | (Ghana) Godwin Attram | (Saudi Arabia) Al-Shabab | | 2 | | 1 | 1 | | | | | | | | 4 |
| 10 | (South Korea) Choi Sung-kuk | (South Korea) Ulsan Hyundai Horang-i | 1 | | | | | | 2 | | 1 | | | | 4 |
| 10 | (Syria) Mohannad Ibrahim | (Syria) Al-Karamah | | 1 | | | | | | 2 | | | | 1 | 4 |
| 10 | (Ecuador) Carlos Tenorio | (Qatar) Al Sadd | | 1 | 1 | | 2 | | | | | | | | 4 |
| 10 | (China) Zou Jie | (China) Dalian Shide | 1 | 1 | | 1 | | 1 | | | | | | | 4 |

== See also ==
- 2006 FIFA Club World Cup
