= 2006–07 Al-Karamah SC season =

Al-Karamah SC
2006–07 season
- Manager: Mohammad Kwid
- Stadium: Khalid ibn al-Walid Stadium
- Syrian Premier League: 1st
- Republic Cup: Winners
- 2006 AFC Champions League: Runners-up
- 2007 AFC Champions League: Quarter-finals

The 2006–07 season was the 79th season in the history of Al-Karamah SC, and featured its participation in the Syrian Premier League, the Republic Cup, and the 2006 and 2007 AFC Champions League, reaching the runner-up position of the former, an unprecedented achievement for a Syrian club.

== Transfers ==
=== In ===
Pos.	Player	Transferred from	Fee	Date	Source
MF	(Syria) Jehad Al-Hussain	Al-Kuwait	Loan return	30 June 2006	
MF	(Syria) Feras Essmael	(Syria) Qardaha		1 July 2006	
DF	(Brazil) Fábio Santos	(Lebanon) Al Ansar	$150,000	1 July 2006	
FW	(Senegal) André Senghor	(United Arab Emirates) Al Ain	Loan		

== Competitions ==
=== Overall record ===
Competition	First match	Last match	Starting round	Final position	Record							
Competition	First match	Last match	Starting round	Final position	Pld	W	D	L	GF	GA	GD	Win %
Syrian Premier League	30 September 2006	19 May 2007	Matchday 1	Winners	26	18	8	0	54	14	+40	69.23
Republic Cup	5 February 2007	1 July 2007	Round of 32	Winners	9	7	2	0	19	6	+13	77.78
2006 AFC Champions League	13 September 2006	8 November 2006	Quarter-finals	Runners-up	6	3	1	2	7	5	+2	50.00
2007 AFC Champions League	7 March 2007	23 May 2007	Group stage	Quarter-finals	6	3	2	1	11	7	+4	50.00
Total					47	31	13	3	91	32	+59	65.96

Source: Competitions

=== Syrian Premier League ===
Pos	Team	Pld	W	D	L	GF	GA	GD	Pts	Qualification or relegation
1	Al-Karamah (C)	26	18	8	0	54	14	+40	62	2008 AFC Champions League (Note: The winner of the 2006–07 Syrian Cup receives a spot in the AFC Champions League. Since Al-Karamah won this competition, the spot went to the league runner-up.)
2	Al-Ittihad	26	17	4	5	44	20	+24	55	2008 AFC Champions League
3	Taliya	26	14	7	5	35	22	+13	49	
4	Al-Majd	26	9	9	8	33	29	+4	36	
5	Al-Jaish	26	9	7	10	35	36	−1	34	

(C) Champions

==== Results summary ====
Overall								Home						Away					
Pld	W	D	L	GF	GA	GD	Pts	W	D	L	GF	GA	GD	W	D	L	GF	GA	GD
26	18	8	0	54	14	+40	62	11	2	0	32	7	+25	7	6	0	22	7	+15

Source: Tribuna

==== Results by round ====
Round	1	2	3	4	5	6	7	8	9	10	11	12	13	14	15	16	17	18	19	20	21	22	23	24	25	26
Ground	A	H	A	H	A	H	A	H	A	H	H	A	H	H	A	H	A	H	A	H	A	H	A	A	H	A
Result	D	D	W	W	W	W	W	W	D	W	W	W	W	W	W	D	W	W	D	W	D	W	D	W	W	D
Position																										

A = Away; H = Home; W = Win; D = Draw; L = Loss

==== Matches ====
30 September 2006 2	Al-Karamah	1–1	Al-Shorta	Homs
				Stadium: Khalid ibn al-Walid Stadium

6 October 2006 3	Al-Wathba	0–1	Al-Karamah

12 November 2006 8	Al-Karamah	4–0	Al-Wahda	Homs
				Stadium: Khalid ibn al-Walid Stadium

15 December 2006 9	Jableh	0–0	Al-Karamah

19 December 2006 1	Taliya	1–1	Al-Karamah

22 December 2006 10	Al-Karamah	3–0	Al-Hurriya	Homs
				Stadium: Khalid ibn al-Walid Stadium

25 December 2006 4	Al-Karamah	2–1	Al-Ittihad	Homs
				Stadium: Khalid ibn al-Walid Stadium

29 December 2006 11	Al-Karamah	4–0	Qardaha	Homs
				Stadium: Khalid ibn al-Walid Stadium

2 January 2007 5	Hutteen	2–5	Al-Karamah

5 January 2007 12	Al-Jaish	0–2	Al-Karamah

8 January 2007 6	Al-Karamah	4–1	Al-Majd	Homs
				Stadium: Khalid ibn al-Walid Stadium

15 January 2007 7	Al-Fotuwa	1–2	Al-Karamah

19 January 2007 13	Al-Karamah	2–1	Tishreen	Homs
				Stadium: Khalid ibn al-Walid Stadium

9 February 2007 14	Al-Karamah	2–0	Taliya	Homs
				Stadium: Khalid ibn al-Walid Stadium

16 February 2007 15	Al-Shorta	0–3	Al-Karamah

2 March 2007 16	Al-Karamah	1–1	Al-Wathba	Homs
				Stadium: Khalid ibn al-Walid Stadium

16 March 2007 18	Al-Karamah	1–0	Hutteen	Homs
				Stadium: Khalid ibn al-Walid Stadium

24 March 2007 19	Al-Majd	1–1	Al-Karamah

1 April 2007 20	Al-Karamah	2–0	Al-Fotuwa	Homs
				Stadium: Khalid ibn al-Walid Stadium

7 April 2007 21	Al-Wahda	2–2	Al-Karamah

14 April 2007 22	Al-Karamah	4–1	Jableh	Homs
				Stadium: Khalid ibn al-Walid Stadium

20 April 2007 23	Al-Hurriya	0–0	Al-Karamah

28 April 2007 24	Qardaha	0–4	Al-Karamah

1 May 2007 17	Al-Ittihad	0–1	Al-Karamah

4 May 2007 25	Al-Karamah	2–1	Al-Jaish	Homs
				Stadium: Khalid ibn al-Walid Stadium

19 May 2007 26	Tishreen	0–0	Al-Karamah

=== Republic Cup ===
==== Round of 32 ====
6 February 2007 First leg	Al-Karamah	2–0	Misfat Baniyas	Homs
				Stadium: Khalid ibn al-Walid Stadium

12 February 2007 Second leg	Misfat Baniyas	0–0 (0–2 agg.)	Al-Karamah

==== Round of 16 ====
26 May 2007 First leg	Al-Jaish	1–2	Al-Karamah

29 May 2007 Second leg	Al-Karamah	3–0 (5–1 agg.)	Al-Jaish	Homs
				Stadium: Khalid ibn al-Walid Stadium

==== Quarter-finals ====
3 June 2007 First leg	Al-Karamah	1–1	Hutteen	Homs
				Stadium: Khalid ibn al-Walid Stadium

8 June 2007 Second leg	Hutteen	2–4 (2–5 agg.)	Al-Karamah

==== Semi-finals ====
12 June 2007 First leg	Al-Karamah	3–0	Al-Wahda	Homs
				Stadium: Khalid ibn al-Walid Stadium

27 June 2007 Second leg	Al-Wahda	1–2 (1–5 agg.)	Al-Karamah

==== Final ====
1 July 2007 Final	Al-Karamah	2–1	Taliya	Damascus
	Abdulrahman Akkari			Stadium: Al-Abbassiyyin Stadium

=== 2006 AFC Champions League ===
==== Knockout stage ====
===== Quarter-finals =====
13 September 2006 First leg	Al-Ittihad (Saudi Arabia)	2–0	(Syria) Al-Karamah	Jeddah, Saudi Arabia

20 September 2006 Second leg	Al-Karamah (Syria)	4–0 (a.e.t.) (4–2 agg.)	(Saudi Arabia) Al-Ittihad	Homs
				Stadium: Khalid ibn al-Walid Stadium

===== Semi-finals =====
27 September 2006 First leg	Al-Karamah (Syria)	0–0	(Kuwait) Qadsia	Homs
				Stadium: Khalid ibn al-Walid Stadium

18 October 2006 Second leg	Qadsia (Kuwait)	0–1 (0–1 agg.)	(Syria) Al-Karamah	Kuwait City, Kuwait

===== Finals =====
1 November 2006 First leg	Jeonbuk Hyundai Motors (South Korea)	2–0	(Syria) Al-Karamah	Jeonju, South Korea

8 November 2006 Second leg	Al-Karamah (Syria)	2–1 (2–3 agg.)	(South Korea) Jeonbuk Hyundai Motors	Homs
				Stadium: Khalid ibn al-Walid Stadium

=== 2007 AFC Champions League ===
==== Group stage ====
Round	1	2	3	4	5	6
Ground	H	A	H	A	A	H
Result	W	L	D	W	D	W
Position						

A = Away; H = Home; W = Win; D = Draw; L = Loss

7 March 2007 1	Al-Karamah (Syria)	2–1	(Qatar) Al Sadd	Homs
19:00 UTC+2				Stadium: Khalid ibn al-Walid Stadium; Attendance: 40,000; Referee: Ali Al Badwawi

21 March 2007 2	Neftchi (Uzbekistan)	2–1	(Syria) Al-Karamah	Fergana, Uzbekistan
				Attendance: 20,000; Referee: Tayeb Shamsuzzaman

11 April 2007 3	Al-Karamah (Syria)	1–1	(Iraq) Al-Najaf	Homs
20:00 UTC+3				Stadium: Khalid ibn al-Walid Stadium; Attendance: 35,000; Referee: Jasim Karim

25 April 2007 4	Al-Najaf (Iraq)	2–4	(Syria) Al-Karamah	Kuwait City, Kuwait
				Referee: Saad Kamil Al-Fadhli

9 May 2007 5	Al Sadd (Qatar)	1–1	(Syria) Al-Karamah	Doha, Qatar

23 May 2007 6	Al-Karamah (Syria)	2–0	(Uzbekistan) Neftchi	Homs
20:00 UTC+3				Stadium: Khalid ibn al-Walid Stadium; Attendance: 35,000; Referee: Ali Al Mutlaq
