= 2005 in South Korean football =

Football in South Korea
- Season: 2005

Men's football
- K League: Ulsan Hyundai Horang-i
- K2 League: Incheon Korail
- Korean FA Cup: Jeonbuk Hyundai Motors
- Korean League Cup: Suwon Samsung Bluewings
- Korean Super Cup: Suwon Samsung Bluewings

This article shows the summary of 2005 football season in South Korea. Ulsan Hyundai Horang-i and Jeonbuk Hyundai Motors became champions of the 2005 K League and 2005 Korean FA Cup respectively, and Busan IPark reached the semi-finals of the 2005 AFC Champions League. The South Korean national team qualified for the 2006 FIFA World Cup.

== National teams ==
=== FIFA World Cup qualification ===
9 February AFC third round, Group 1	South Korea	2–0	Kuwait	Seoul, South Korea
	Lee Dong-gook 23'; Lee Young-pyo 80'

25 March AFC third round, Group 1	Saudi Arabia	2–0	South Korea	Dammam, Saudi Arabia
	Kariri 29'; Al-Qahtani 75'

30 March AFC third round, Group 1	South Korea	2–1	Uzbekistan	Seoul, South Korea
	Lee Young-pyo 54'; Lee Dong-gook 62'		Geynrikh 78'

3 June AFC third round, Group 1	Uzbekistan	1–1	South Korea	Tashkent, Uzbekistan
	Shatskikh 63'		Park Chu-young 90'

8 June AFC third round, Group 1	Kuwait	0–4	South Korea	Kuwait City, Kuwait
			Park Chu-young 18'; Lee Dong-gook 28' (pen.); Chung Kyung-ho 54'; Park Ji-sung 60'

17 August AFC third round, Group 1	South Korea	0–1	Saudi Arabia	Seoul, South Korea
			Al-Anbar 4'

AFC third round, Group 1 table
Pos	Team	Pld	W	D	L	GF	GA	GD	Pts	Qualification
1	Saudi Arabia	6	4	2	0	10	1	+9	14	Qualification for World Cup
2	South Korea	6	3	1	2	9	5	+4	10	Qualification for World Cup
3	Uzbekistan	6	1	2	3	7	11	−4	5	Advance to AFC fourth round
4	Kuwait	6	1	1	4	4	13	−9	4	

=== EAFF Championship ===
31 July	South Korea	1–1	China	Daejeon, South Korea
	Kim Jin-kyu 73'		Sun Xiang 52'

4 August	South Korea	0–0	North Korea	Jeonju, South Korea

8 August	South Korea	0–1	Japan	Daegu, South Korea
			Nakazawa 86'

Pos	Team	Pld	W	D	L	GF	GA	GD	Pts
1	China (C)	3	1	2	0	5	3	+2	5
2	Japan	3	1	1	1	3	3	0	4
3	North Korea	3	1	1	1	1	2	−1	4
4	South Korea (H)	3	0	2	1	1	2	−1	2

Source: EAFF
(C) Champions; (H) Hosts

=== Friendlies ===
==== Senior team ====
15 January	South Korea	1–2	Colombia	Los Angeles, United States
	Chung Kyung-ho 2'		Castillo 41'; Perea 75'

19 January	South Korea	1–1	Paraguay	Los Angeles, United States
	Kim Jin-kyu 46'	Report	Cardozo 45+1' (pen.)

22 January	South Korea	1–1	Sweden	Carson, United States
	Chung Kyung-ho 70'		Rosenberg 86'

4 February	South Korea	0–1	Egypt	Seoul, South Korea
			Moteab 14'

20 March	South Korea	1–0	Burkina Faso	Dubai, United Arab Emirates
	Kim Sang-sik 65'

14 August	South Korea	3–0 (Note: Not recognised as international "A" match.)	North Korea	Seoul, South Korea
	Chung Kyung-ho 34'; Kim Jin-yong 36'; Park Chu-young 68'

12 October	South Korea	2–0	Iran	Seoul, South Korea
	Cho Won-hee 1'; Kim Jin-kyu 90'

12 November	South Korea	2–2	Sweden	Seoul, South Korea
	Ahn Jung-hwan 7'; Kim Young-chul 51'		Linderoth 8'; Rosenberg 56'

16 November	South Korea	2–0	Serbia and Montenegro	Seoul, South Korea
	Choi Jin-cheul 4'; Lee Dong-gook 66'

== Leagues ==
=== K League ===
==== Regular season ====
Pos	Team	Pld	W	D	L	GF	GA	GD	Pts	Qualification
1	Incheon United	24	13	6	5	36	26	+10	45	Qualification for playoffs
2	Seongnam Ilhwa Chunma	24	12	7	5	40	24	+16	43	Second stage winners
3	Ulsan Hyundai Horang-i	24	13	4	7	31	24	+7	43	Qualification for playoffs
4	Bucheon SK	24	12	6	6	26	18	+8	42	
5	Pohang Steelers	24	11	7	6	28	22	+6	40	
6	FC Seoul	24	8	8	8	37	32	+5	32	
7	Daejeon Citizen	24	6	12	6	19	20	−1	30	
8	Daegu FC	24	8	6	10	29	36	−7	30	
9	Suwon Samsung Bluewings	24	6	10	8	29	32	−3	28	
10	Busan IPark	24	7	7	10	28	31	−3	28	First stage winners
11	Jeonnam Dragons	24	7	6	11	23	29	−6	27	
12	Jeonbuk Hyundai Motors	24	4	6	14	24	41	−17	18	Qualification for Champions League (Note: Qualified as champions of FA Cup.)
13	Gwangju Sangmu Bulsajo	24	4	5	15	23	38	−15	17	

Source: RSSSF

==== Championship playoffs ====
Semi-finals
Busan IPark	0
Incheon United	2
Seongnam Ilhwa Chunma	1
Ulsan Hyundai Horang-i	2

Final
Incheon United	1	2	3
Ulsan Hyundai Horang-i	5	1	6

==== Final table ====
Pos	Team	Qualification
1	Ulsan Hyundai Horang-i (C)	Qualification for Champions League
2	Incheon United	
3	Seongnam Ilhwa Chunma	
4	Busan IPark	

Source: RSSSF
(C) Champion

=== K2 League ===
==== First stage ====
Pos	Team	Pld	W	D	L	GF	GA	GD	Pts	
1	Suwon City	10	7	1	2	19	10	+9	22	Qualification for playoff
2	Hyundai Mipo Dockyard	10	6	3	1	25	15	+10	21	
3	Goyang KB Kookmin Bank	10	6	2	2	15	6	+9	20	
4	Gangneung City	10	5	2	3	13	11	+2	17	
5	Gimpo Hallelujah	10	5	2	3	11	12	−1	17	
6	Icheon Sangmu	10	4	3	3	11	8	+3	15	
7	Incheon Korail	10	4	1	5	10	11	−1	13	
8	Uijeongbu Hummel Korea	10	3	3	4	10	12	−2	12	
9	Changwon City	10	2	3	5	7	13	−6	9	
10	Daejeon KHNP	10	1	2	7	7	14	−7	5	
11	Seosan Citizen	10	1	0	9	4	20	−16	3	

Source: RSSSF

==== Second stage ====
Pos	Team	Pld	W	D	L	GF	GA	GD	Pts	
1	Incheon Korail	10	6	3	1	14	7	+7	21	Qualification for playoff
2	Icheon Sangmu	10	5	3	2	11	6	+5	18	
3	Goyang KB Kookmin Bank	10	4	3	3	13	7	+6	15	
4	Gimpo Hallelujah	10	4	3	3	19	15	+4	15	
5	Changwon City	10	4	3	3	16	15	+1	15	
6	Suwon City	10	3	5	2	16	13	+3	14	
7	Uijeongbu Hummel Korea	10	2	7	1	7	6	+1	13	
8	Hyundai Mipo Dockyard	10	3	3	4	13	14	−1	12	
9	Gangneung City	10	2	3	5	7	12	−5	9	
10	Seosan Citizen	10	1	6	3	8	15	−7	9	
11	Daejeon KHNP	10	0	3	7	6	20	−14	3	

Source: RSSSF

==== Championship playoff ====
Team 1	Agg.	Team 2	1st leg	2nd leg
Incheon Korail (C)	4–2	Suwon City	2–1	2–1

== Domestic cups ==
=== Korean FA Cup ===
Round of 32
Korea University	0
Jeonbuk Hyundai Motors	2
FC Seoul	2
Gimpo Hallelujah	1
Suwon Samsung Bluewings (p)	1 (5)
Suwon City	1 (3)
Chung-Ang University	2
Seongnam Ilhwa Chunma	3
Uijeongbu Hummel	1
Incheon Korail (a.e.t.)	2
Bucheon SK (a.e.t.)	3
Gangneung City	0
Goyang Kookmin Bank	4
Bongshin Club	0
Ajou University	2
Incheon United	3
Busan IPark	1
Hyundai Mipo Dockyard	2
Daejeon Citizen (a.e.t.)	3
Daegu University	1
Pohang Steelers	2
Honam University	1
Gwangju Sangmu	6
Konkuk University	1
Jeonnam Dragons	w/o
Seosan Citizen	—
Ulsan Hyundai Horang-i	3
Honam University	1
Daegu FC	1
Hongik University	0
Daejeon KHNP	1
Changwon City	0

Round of 16
Jeonbuk Hyundai Motors	2
FC Seoul	1
Suwon Samsung Bluewings	3
Seongnam Ilhwa Chunma	1
Incheon Korail	4
Bucheon SK	2
Goyang Kookmin Bank	2
Incheon United	1
Hyundai Mipo Dockyard (p)	1 (3)
Daejeon Citizen	1 (2)
Pohang Steelers (p)	0 (4)
Gwangju Sangmu	0 (3)
Jeonnam Dragons (a.e.t.)	2
Ulsan Hyundai Horang-i	1
Daegu FC	4
Daejeon KHNP	1

Quarter-finals
Jeonbuk Hyundai Motors (p)	3 (4)
Suwon Samsung Bluewings	3 (2)
Incheon Korail	2
Goyang Kookmin Bank	1
Hyundai Mipo Dockyard (p)	0 (4)
Pohang Steelers	0 (3)
Jeonnam Dragons	2
Daegu FC	1

Semi-finals
14 December – Seoul
Jeonbuk Hyundai Motors	3
Incheon Korail	1
14 December – Seoul
Hyundai Mipo Dockyard	3
Jeonnam Dragons	1

Final
17 December – Seoul
Jeonbuk Hyundai Motors	1
Hyundai Mipo Dockyard	0

=== Korean League Cup ===
Pos	Team	Pld	W	D	L	GF	GA	GD	Pts
1	Suwon Samsung Bluewings (C)	12	7	4	1	20	11	+9	25
2	Ulsan Hyundai Horang-i	12	6	5	1	17	11	+6	23
3	Pohang Steelers	12	4	8	0	13	9	+4	20
4	Bucheon SK	12	5	3	4	14	13	+1	18
5	FC Seoul	12	5	2	5	18	18	0	17
6	Incheon United	12	4	3	5	9	10	−1	15
7	Daegu FC	12	4	3	5	16	18	−2	15
8	Seongnam Ilhwa Chunma	12	3	5	4	9	9	0	14
9	Jeonnam Dragons	12	3	5	4	11	12	−1	14
10	Daejeon Citizen	12	3	4	5	9	11	−2	13
11	Gwangju Sangmu	12	3	3	6	7	13	−6	12
12	Jeonbuk Hyundai Motors	12	2	5	5	12	14	−2	11
13	Busan IPark	12	2	4	6	8	14	−6	10

Source: RSSSF
(C) Champions

=== Korean Super Cup ===
1 March

Suwon Samsung Bluewings	1–0	Busan IPark
Nádson 28'

Suwon World Cup Stadium, Suwon
Attendance: 21,784

== International cups ==
=== AFC Champions League ===
Team	Result	Round	Aggregate	Score	Venue	Opponent
Busan IPark	Semi-finals	Group G	Winners	8–0	Home	(Vietnam) Bình Định
Busan IPark	Semi-finals	Group G	Winners	4–0	Away	(Vietnam) Bình Định
Busan IPark	Semi-finals	Group G	Winners	2–0	Away	(Thailand) Krung Thai Bank
Busan IPark	Semi-finals	Group G	Winners	4–0	Home	(Thailand) Krung Thai Bank
Busan IPark	Semi-finals	Group G	Winners	4–0	Home	(Indonesia) Persebaya Surabaya
Busan IPark	Semi-finals	Group G	Winners	3–0	Away	(Indonesia) Persebaya Surabaya
Busan IPark	Semi-finals	Quarter-finals	5–1	3–0	Home	(Qatar) Al-Sadd
Busan IPark	Semi-finals	Quarter-finals	5–1	2–1	Away	(Qatar) Al-Sadd
Busan IPark	Semi-finals	Semi-finals	0–7	0–5	Home	(Saudi Arabia) Al-Ittihad
Busan IPark	Semi-finals	Semi-finals	0–7	0–2	Away	(Saudi Arabia) Al-Ittihad
Suwon Samsung Bluewings	Group stage	Group E	Runners-up	5–1	Away	(Vietnam) Hoang Anh Gia Lai
Suwon Samsung Bluewings	Group stage	Group E	Runners-up	6–0	Home	(Vietnam) Hoang Anh Gia Lai
Suwon Samsung Bluewings	Group stage	Group E	Runners-up	0–0	Home	(China) Shenzhen Jianlibao
Suwon Samsung Bluewings	Group stage	Group E	Runners-up	0–1	Away	(China) Shenzhen Jianlibao
Suwon Samsung Bluewings	Group stage	Group E	Runners-up	2–1	Home	(Japan) Júbilo Iwata
Suwon Samsung Bluewings	Group stage	Group E	Runners-up	1–0	Away	(Japan) Júbilo Iwata

== See also ==
- Football in South Korea
