= Kim Young-sun =

Kim Young-sun may refer to:

- Kim Young-sun (footballer)
- Kim Young-sun (actress)
- Kim Youngsun, South Korean voice actor
