= Hassan Abbas =

Hassan Abbas may refer to:

- Hassan Abbas (footballer) (born 1974), Syrian footballer
- Hassan Abbas (scholar) (born 1969), Pakistani-American scholar
