= Lee Sang-min =

Lee Sang-min (Korean: 이상민) is a Korean name consisting of the family name Lee and the given name Sang-min, and may also refer to:

- Lee Sang-min (lawyer) (born 1965), South Korean politician
- Lee Sang-min (basketball) (born 1972), South Korean basketball player
- Lee Sang-min (singer) (born 1973), South Korean music producer and former member of Roolra
- Lee Sang-min (footballer, born 1986), South Korean footballer
- Lee Sang-min (footballer, born 1998), South Korean footballer
