= Fabão =

Fabão is a nick name, an augmentative for Fabio. It may refer to:

- Fabão (footballer, born 1976), José Fábio Alves Azevedo, Brazilian football centre-back
- Fabão (footballer, born 1981), Fábio Santos da Silva, Brazilian football defender
