= 2005 K2 League =

Hyundai Motors K2 League
- Season: 2005
- Dates: 5 April – 13 November 2005
- Champions: Incheon Korail (1st title)
- Matches: 55
- Goals: 262 (4.76 per match)
- Best Player: Chung Seok-keun
- Top goalscorer: Kim Han-won (11 goals)

The 2005 K2 League was the third season of the second-tier Korea National League, in the South Korean league system. The league was divided into two stages, the First stage and Second stage, and the winners of each stage are qualified for the championship playoff.

== Regular season ==
=== First stage ===
Pos	Team	Pld	W	D	L	GF	GA	GD	Pts	
1	Suwon City	10	7	1	2	19	10	+9	22	Qualification for the playoff
2	Hyundai Mipo Dockyard	10	6	3	1	25	15	+10	21	
3	Goyang KB Kookmin Bank	10	6	2	2	15	6	+9	20	
4	Gangneung City	10	5	2	3	13	11	+2	17	
5	Gimpo Hallelujah	10	5	2	3	11	12	−1	17	
6	Icheon Sangmu	10	4	3	3	11	8	+3	15	
7	Incheon Korail	10	4	1	5	10	11	−1	13	
8	Uijeongbu Hummel Korea	10	3	3	4	10	12	−2	12	
9	Changwon City	10	2	3	5	7	13	−6	9	
10	Daejeon KHNP	10	1	2	7	7	14	−7	5	
11	Seosan Citizen	10	1	0	9	4	20	−16	3	

Source: RSSSF

=== Second stage ===
Pos	Team	Pld	W	D	L	GF	GA	GD	Pts	
1	Incheon Korail	10	6	3	1	14	7	+7	21	Qualification for the playoff
2	Icheon Sangmu	10	5	3	2	11	6	+5	18	
3	Goyang KB Kookmin Bank	10	4	3	3	13	7	+6	15	
4	Gimpo Hallelujah	10	4	3	3	19	15	+4	15	
5	Changwon City	10	4	3	3	16	15	+1	15	
6	Suwon City	10	3	5	2	16	13	+3	14	
7	Uijeongbu Hummel Korea	10	2	7	1	7	6	+1	13	
8	Hyundai Mipo Dockyard	10	3	3	4	13	14	−1	12	
9	Gangneung City	10	2	3	5	7	12	−5	9	
10	Seosan Citizen	10	1	6	3	8	15	−7	9	
11	Daejeon KHNP	10	0	3	7	6	20	−14	3	

Source: RSSSF

== Championship playoff ==
=== Summary ===
Team 1	Agg.	Team 2	1st leg	2nd leg
Incheon Korail (C)	4–2	Suwon City	2–1	2–1

=== Results ===
November 10

Incheon Korail	2–1	Suwon City
Cho Sung-won 80'; Jung Suk-keun 88'		Kim Han-won 40'

Incheon Munhak Stadium, Incheon

November 13

Suwon City	1–2	Incheon Korail
Lee Young-kyun 45+2'		Na Kwang-hyun 7' (pen.); Jung Suk-keun 75'

Suwon Sports Complex, Suwon

Incheon Korail won 4–2 on aggregate.

== See also ==
- 2005 in South Korean football
- 2005 K2 League Championship
- 2005 Korean FA Cup
