= Aatef Jenyat =

Syrian footballer (born 1986)

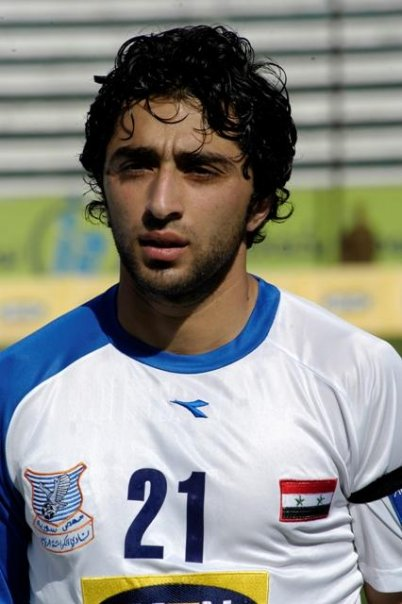

Personal information
- Full name: Aatef Jenyat
- Date of birth: 8 May 1986 (age 40)
- Place of birth: Homs, Syria
- Height: 1.73 m (5 ft 8 in)
- Position: Wingback

Team information
- Current team: Al-Masafi

Youth career
- –2004: Al-Karamah

Senior career*
Years	Team	Apps	(Gls)
2004–2010	Al-Karamah	85	(22)
2010–2011	Tishreen	?	(?)
2011	Shabab Al Ordon	7	(1)
2012	Najaf	6	(2)
2013–2014	Al-Masafi	3	(0)

International career^{‡}
2003–2005	Syria U-20	?	(?)
2004–2010	Syria	47	(4)
- * Club domestic league appearances and goals as of 1 March 2012 ‡ National team caps and goals as of 1 March 2012

Aatef Jenyat (Arabic: عَاطِف جَنيَات; born 8 May 1986 in Homs, Syria) is retired Syrian footballer who is former member of the Syria national football team.

== Career ==
=== Club career ===
Jenyat's career began in the youth system of Al-Karamah before starting his professional career with the senior team in 2004. He won with Al-Karamah four Syrian Premier League titles, four Syrian Cups, one Super Cup and helped the club reach the final of the AFC Champions League for the first time. Al-Karamah were defeated 3–2 on aggregate in the final by Jeonbuk Hyundai Motors of the K-League. Three years later, he was an important factor in his side's first-ever accession to AFC Cup Final. Al-Karamah were defeated 2–1 in the final of the second most important association cup in Asia by Kuwait SC of the Kuwaiti Premier League. In October 2010, Jenyat signed a contract with Syrian League club Tishreen but after six months the contract has been dissolved. In June 2011, he moved to Jordan Premier League club Shabab Al Ordon on a one-year deal, but after five months the contract has been dissolved. On 25 February 2012, Jenyat moved to Iraqi Premier League club Najaf FC.

=== International career ===
Jenyat was a part of the Syrian Under-19 national team that finished in Fourth place in the 2004 AFC U-19 Championship in Malaysia and he was a part of the Syrian U-20 national team in the 2005 FIFA U-20 World Cup in the Netherlands. He plays against Canada and Colombia in the group-stage of the FIFA U-20 World Cup and against Brazil in the Round of 16.

==== International goals ====
Scores and results table. Syria's goal tally first:

Aatef Jenyat: International goals
No.	Date	Venue	Opponent	Score	Result	Competition
1	19 April 2004	Khartoum Stadium, Khartoum, Sudan	Sudan	2–1	2–1	International Friendly
2	5 August 2006	Abbasiyyin Stadium, Damascus, Syria	Libya	1–0	2–1	International Friendly
3	25 August 2007	Ambedkar Stadium, New Delhi, India	Cambodia	5–1	5–1	2007 Nehru Cup
4	26 October 2007	Pamir Stadium, Dushanbe, Tajikistan	Afghanistan	1–1	2–1	2010 FIFA World Cup qualification

== Honours ==
Al-Karamah

- Syrian Premier League: 2005–06, 2006–07, 2007–08, 2008–09
- Syrian Cup: 2006–07, 2007–08, 2008–09, 2009–2010
- Syrian Super Cup: 2008
- AFC Champions League runner-up: 2006
- AFC Cup runner-up: 2009

Syria

- AFC U-19 Championship 2004: fourth place
- Nehru Cup runner-up: 2007
