= Zé Carlos (footballer, born 1983) =

Brazilian footballer

Personal information
- Full name: José Carlos Ferreira Filho
- Date of birth: 24 April 1983 (age 43)
- Place of birth: Maceió, Brazil
- Height: 1.86 m (6 ft 1 in)
- Position: Striker

Youth career
- Corinthians

Senior career*
Years	Team	Apps	(Gls)
2001–2005	Corinthians-AL	0	(0)
2001–2003	→ Porto B (loan)	48	(12)
2003–2004	→ Vizela (loan)	8	(2)
2004	→ CRB (loan)		
2004–2005	→ Ulsan Hyundai (loan)	13	(7)
2005	Ponte Preta	7	(2)
2006–2008	Jeonbuk Hyundai Motors	35	(10)
2008	América	0	(0)
2008–2011	Corinthians-AL	0	(0)
2009	→ Paulista (loan)	0	(0)
2009	→ Cruzeiro (loan)	8	(1)
2009	→ Portuguesa (loan)	16	(8)
2010	→ Gamba Osaka (loan)	1	(0)
2010	→ Portuguesa (loan)	17	(5)
2011–2013	→ Criciúma (loan)	52	(40)
2013	Changchun Yatai	10	(1)
2013–2014	Sharjah SC	22	(7)
2014	Criciúma	9	(0)
2015	CRB	36	(22)
2016	Ajman Club	0	(0)
2016	CRB	22	(9)
2017	Santa Cruz	0	(0)
2017	Fortaleza	10	(6)
2017	CRB	22	(4)
2018	Paraná	2	(0)
2018	Criciúma	29	(10)
2019	CRB	9	(1)
2020	São Bernardo	3	(0)
2020	Remo	7	(2)
2021	Murici	4	(1)
- * Club domestic league appearances and goals

José Carlos Ferreira Filho (born 24 April 1983), known as Zé Carlos, is a retired Brazilian professional footballer who played as a striker.

== Club career ==
Born in Maceió, Alagoas, Zé Carlos started out at local Sport Club Corinthians Alagoano, who loaned him several times for the duration of his contract, including to clubs in Portugal and South Korea. He made his Série A debuts after being released, appearing rarely for Associação Atlética Ponte Preta during the 2005 season as it narrowly avoided relegation.

In 2006, Zé Carlos returned to the K League and joined Jeonbuk Hyundai Motors FC, winning that year's AFC Champions League after scoring the decisive goal in a 1–2 away loss against Al-Karamah SC in the final's second leg (3–2 aggregate win). He subsequently returned to Corinthians, who again successively loaned him; during one of these spells, with Cruzeiro Esporte Clube, he received the fastest red card in the history of the Brazilian top flight, being sent off after just twelve seconds for elbowing Clube Atlético Mineiro's Renan Teixeira during a 12 July 2009 clash.

In the 2012 campaign, with Criciúma Esporte Clube, Zé Carlos netted a career-best 27 goals to help his team promote from Série B. On 3 February 2013, he signed for Changchun Yatai F.C. in the Chinese Super League.

== Honors ==
Jeonbuk Hyundai Motors

- AFC Champions League: 1

2006
