= Meysam Soleimani =

Iranian footballer

Personal information
- Full name: Meysam Soleimani
- Date of birth: January 21, 1982 (age 44)
- Place of birth: Ahvaz, Iran
- Height: 1.72 m (5 ft 8 in)
- Position: Defender

Senior career*
Years	Team	Apps	(Gls)
2000–2007	Foolad		
2007	→ Sepahan (loan)		
2007–	Saat Ava Rey		
- * Club domestic league appearances and goals as of 5 January 2008 ‡ National team caps and goals as of 5 January 2008

Meysam Soleimani (Persian: میثم سلیمانی, born January 21, 1982) is an Iranian football defender.

Soleimani played for Foolad F.C. in the 2006 AFC Champions League group stage.

== International goals ==
No.	Date	Venue	Opponent	Score	Result	Competition
1.	8 October 2011	Zayed Sports City Stadium, Abu Dhabi, UAE	Syria	1–0	4–1	2011 WAFF Women's Championship
2.	8 October 2011	Zayed Sports City Stadium, Abu Dhabi, UAE	Syria	2–0	4–1	2011 WAFF Women's Championship
