= Kim Hyun-su (footballer, born February 1973) =

South Korean footballer

Personal information
- Date of birth: February 14, 1973 (age 53)
- Place of birth: South Korea
- Position: Defender

Youth career
- 1991–1994: Yonsei University

Senior career*
Years	Team	Apps	(Gls)
1995–2002	Chunnam Dragons	87	(2)
1998–1999	→ Sangmu (military service)		
2003–2008	Jeonbuk Hyundai Motors	127	(2)

International career^{‡}
1995–1996	South Korea U-23	28	(0)
1998	South Korea	7	(0)
- * Club domestic league appearances and goals as of 18 November 2008 ‡ National team caps and goals as of 18 November 2008

- Kim Hyun-su
- Hangul: 김현수
- Hanja: 金鉉洙
- RR: Gim Hyeonsu
- MR: Kim Hyŏnsu

Kim Hyun-su (born February 14, 1973) is a South Korean former footballer who last played as a defender.

== Club career ==
He started his club career with Chunnam Dragons.

At the end of the 2002 season, he moved to Jeonbuk Hyundai Motors. On 9 November 2008, at the halftime of last match of 2008 season, he announced his retirement. He desired to be a coach with Jeonbuk Hyundai Motors.

He was part of the South Korea national football team. He played at 1996 Summer Olympics and 1998 Asian Games.

== Honours ==
=== Club ===
- 1996: Korean FA Cup winner with Chunnam Dragons
- 2003: Korean FA Cup winner with Jeonbuk Hyundai Motors
- 2005: Korean FA Cup winner with Jeonbuk Hyundai Motors
- 2006: AFC Champions League winner with Jeonbuk Hyundai Motors
