= 2005 Korean FA Cup =

2005 Hana Bank FA Cup

Tournament details
- Country: South Korea

Final positions
- Champions: Jeonbuk Hyundai Motors (3rd title)
- Runners-up: Hyundai Mipo Dockyard

Tournament statistics
- Top goal scorer: Milton Rodríguez (6 goals)

Awards
- Best player: Milton Rodríguez

The 2005 Korean FA Cup, known as the 2005 Hana Bank FA Cup, was the tenth edition of the Korean FA Cup.

== Bracket ==
Round of 32
Korea University	0
Jeonbuk Hyundai Motors	2
FC Seoul	2
Gimpo Hallelujah	1
Suwon Samsung Bluewings (p)	1 (5)
Suwon City	1 (3)
Chung-Ang University	2
Seongnam Ilhwa Chunma	3
Uijeongbu Hummel	1
Incheon Korail (a.e.t.)	2
Bucheon SK (a.e.t.)	3
Gangneung City	0
Goyang Kookmin Bank	4
Bongshin Club	0
Ajou University	2
Incheon United	3
Busan IPark	1
Hyundai Mipo Dockyard	2
Daejeon Citizen (a.e.t.)	3
Daegu University	1
Pohang Steelers	2
Honam University	1
Gwangju Sangmu	6
Konkuk University	1
Jeonnam Dragons	w/o
Seosan Citizen	—
Ulsan Hyundai Horang-i	3
Honam University	1
Daegu FC	1
Hongik University	0
Daejeon KHNP	1
Changwon City	0

Round of 16
Jeonbuk Hyundai Motors	2
FC Seoul	1
Suwon Samsung Bluewings	3
Seongnam Ilhwa Chunma	1
Incheon Korail	4
Bucheon SK	2
Goyang Kookmin Bank	2
Incheon United	1
Hyundai Mipo Dockyard (p)	1 (3)
Daejeon Citizen	1 (2)
Pohang Steelers (p)	0 (4)
Gwangju Sangmu	0 (3)
Jeonnam Dragons (a.e.t.)	2
Ulsan Hyundai Horang-i	1
Daegu FC	4
Daejeon KHNP	1

Quarter-finals
Jeonbuk Hyundai Motors (p)	3 (4)
Suwon Samsung Bluewings	3 (2)
Incheon Korail	2
Goyang Kookmin Bank	1
Hyundai Mipo Dockyard (p)	0 (4)
Pohang Steelers	0 (3)
Jeonnam Dragons	2
Daegu FC	1

Semi-finals
14 December – Seoul
Jeonbuk Hyundai Motors	3
Incheon Korail	1
14 December – Seoul
Hyundai Mipo Dockyard	3
Jeonnam Dragons	1

Final
17 December – Seoul
Jeonbuk Hyundai Motors	1
Hyundai Mipo Dockyard	0

== Round of 32 ==
26 October	Busan IPark	1–2	Hyundai Mipo Dockyard	Gimhae Stadium
	Ko Chang-hyun 68'		Jun Sang-dae 18'; Park Hee-wan 74'

26 October	Daejeon Citizen	3–1 (a.e.t.)	Daegu University	Gimhae Stadium
	Leandrão 88', 105', 120'		? (?)

26 October	Pohang Steelers	2–1	Honam University	Kyungju Stadium
	Park Won-jae 30'; Hwang Jin-sung 52'		Kim Dong-chan 73'

26 October	Gwangju Sangmu	6–1	Konkuk University	Gyeongju Stadium
	Kim Young-chul 16', 22'; Yoon Bo-young 28', 38', 72'; Park Joo-sung 47'		Seo Dong-hyun 81' (pen.)

26 October	Daegu FC	1–0	Hongik University	Changwon Civil Stadium
	Ha Sung-ryong 24'

26 October	Daejeon KHNP	1–0	Changwon City	Changwon Civil Stadium
	Kim Jung-hyun 29' (pen.)

26 October	Ulsan Hyundai Horang-i	3–1	Hannam University	Yangsan Stadium
	Lee Jin-ho 2', 84'; Barbieri 90+2'		Lee Sang-min 51'

26 October	Jeonnam Dragons	Walkover	Seosan Citizen	Yangsan Stadium

26 October	Korea University	0–2	Jeonbuk Hyundai Motors	Nonsan Stadium
			Botti 10'; Neto Baiano 10'

26 October	FC Seoul	2–1	Gimpo Hallelujah	Nonsan Stadium
	Kim Eun-jung 16'; Han Dong-won 80'		Song Dong-joon 90+1'

26 October	Chung-Ang University	2–3	Seongnam Ilhwa Chunma	Paju NFC
	Choi Kil-ho 21'; Lee Chi-joon 59'		Do Jae-jun 24'; Kim Tae-yoon 54'; Sin Dong-geun 87'

26 October	Suwon Samsung Bluewings	1–1 (a.e.t.) (5–3 p)	Suwon City	Paju NFC
	Kim Dae-eui 89'		Kim Han-won 65'

26 October	Ajou University	2–3	Incheon United	Paju NFC
	Cho Yong-ki 12'; Choi Young-nam 66'		Lee Jun-yong 22'; Kim Chi-woo 28'; Radončić 80' (pen.)

26 October	Goyang Kookmin Bank	4–0	Bongshin Club	Paju NFC
	Go Min-gi 49'; Kim Yoon-dong 56'; Choi Bae-sik 84'; Don Ji-duck 86'

26 October	Uijeongbu Hummel	1–2 (a.e.t.)	Incheon Korail	Paju Public Stadium
	Lee Kil-yong 36'		Kim Eun-chul 86', 106'

26 October	Bucheon SK	3–0 (a.e.t.)	Gangneung City	Paju Public Stadium
	Hong Ju-wan 95' (pen.); Agostinho 102'; Kim Dae-hyun 113'

== Round of 16 ==
2 November	Pohang Steelers	0–0 (a.e.t.) (4–3 p)	Gwangju Sangmu	Gyeongju Stadium

2 November	Daegu FC	4–1	Daejeon KHNP	Masan Stadium
	Song Jeong-woo 13'; Gentil 62'; Song Jung-hyun 69'; Jin Soon-jin 77'		Kim Hong-ki 27'

2 November	Ulsan Hyundai Horang-i	1–2 (a.e.t.)	Jeonnam Dragons	Gyeongju Stadium
	Yoo Kyoung-youl 16'		Shin Byung-ho 80'; Noh Byung-joon 108'

2 November	Jeonbuk Hyundai Motors	2–1	FC Seoul	Nonsan Stadium
	Jung Jong-kwan 59'; Rodríguez 87'		Jung Jo-gook 63'

2 November	Seongnam Ilhwa Chunma	1–3	Suwon Samsung Bluewings	Paju Public Stadium
	Woo Sung-yong 64'		Cho Jae-min 29'; Itamar 49', 90'

2 November	Incheon United	1–2	Goyang Kookmin Bank	Nonsan Stadium
	Seo Ki-bok 70'		Don Ji-duck 8'; Lee Do-kweon 71'

2 November	Incheon Korail	4–2	Bucheon SK	Paju Public Stadium
	Hwang Sang-pil 37', 73'; Kim Eun-chul 50'; Jung Suk-keun 90+3'		Kim Ki-hyung 45+1'; Hong Ju-wan 89'

21 November	Hyundai Mipo Dockyard	1–1 (a.e.t.) (3–2 p)	Daejeon Citizen	Gimcheon Stadium
		Report	Lim Young-ju 30'; Choi Ku-ruk 32' (o.g.)

== Quarter-finals ==
10 December	Hyundai Mipo Dockyard	0–0 (a.e.t.) (4–3 p)	Pohang Steelers	Changwon Civil Stadium

10 December	Daegu FC	1–2	Jeonnam Dragons	Changwon Civil Stadium
	Oh Jang-eun 23'		Neaga 27', 59'

10 December	Jeonbuk Hyundai Motors	3–3 (a.e.t.) (4–2 p)	Suwon Samsung Bluewings	Gimhae Stadium
	Rodríguez 51', 99'; Cho Jin-soo 62'		Kim Nam-il 45+1', 94'; Itamar 89'

10 December	Goyang Kookmin Bank	1–2	Incheon Korail	Gimhae Stadium
	Kim Ki-jong 63'		Lee Jong-mook 14'; Jung Hyun-kyu 90+1'

== Semi-finals ==
14 December	Hyundai Mipo Dockyard	3–1	Jeonnam Dragons	Seoul World Cup Stadium
	Lee Jae-chun 40'; Kim Young-ki 49'; Jung Min-moo 90+3'		Noh Byung-joon 62'

14 December	Jeonbuk Hyundai Motors	3–1	Incheon Korail	Seoul World Cup Stadium
	Rodríguez 16', 89'; Botti 45'		Jung Hyun-kyu 68'

== Final ==
17 December	Hyundai Mipo Dockyard	0–1	Jeonbuk Hyundai Motors	Seoul World Cup Stadium
			Rodríguez 13'

== Awards ==
Award	Winner	Team
Most Valuable Player	(Colombia) Milton Rodríguez	Jeonbuk Hyundai Motors
Top goalscorer	(Colombia) Milton Rodríguez	Jeonbuk Hyundai Motors
Best Manager	(South Korea) Choi Kang-hee	Jeonbuk Hyundai Motors
Fair Play Award	Hyundai Mipo Dockyard	

== See also ==
- 2005 in South Korean football
- 2005 K League
- 2005 K2 League
- 2005 Korean League Cup
