= Adnan Al-Hafez =

Syrian footballer (born 1984)

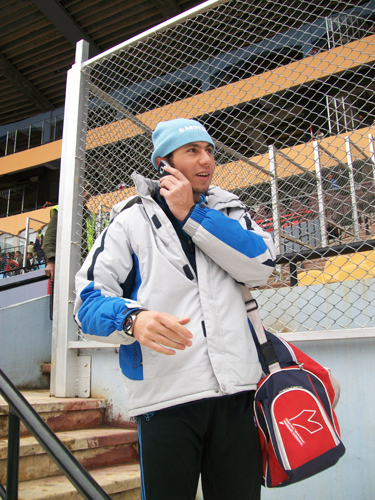
- Al-Hafez in 2009

Personal information
- Full name: Adnan Al Hafez
- Date of birth: 23 April 1984 (age 42)
- Place of birth: Homs, Syria
- Height: 1.86 m (6 ft 1 in)
- Position: Goalkeeper

Senior career*
Years	Team	Apps	(Gls)
2002–2009	Al-Karamah		
2009–2010	Al-Taliya		
2010–2014	Al-Wahda		
2014–2015	Al-Karamah		

International career^{‡}
2003–2005	Syria U-20		
2006–2011	Syria	3	(0)
- * Club domestic league appearances and goals ‡ National team caps and goals as of 1 January 2011

Adnan Al-Hafez (Arabic: عَدْنَان الْحَافِظ; born April 23, 1984) is a Syrian former football goalkeeper.

== Club career ==
Al Hafez started his professional career at the Syrian Premier League with Al-Karamah. On 27 July 2009, Al Hafez signed a two-year contract with Al-Taliya, but ten months later the contract has been dissolved.

On May 22, 2010, Al Hafez moved to Al-Wahda in the Syrian Premier League and signed a two-year contract.

== International career ==
Al Hafez plays between 2003 and 2005 for the Under-19 Syrian national team. The Syrian U-19 team that finished in Fourth place in the AFC U-19 Championship 2004 in Malaysia and he was a part of the Syrian U-20 team in the FIFA U-20 World Cup 2005. in the Netherlands.

He played against Canada, Italy in the group-stage of the FIFA U-20 World Cup 2005 and against Brazil in the Round of 16.

He was named in the Syrian senior squad for the 2011 AFC Asian Cup in Qatar.

=== Appearances in major competitions ===
Team	Competition	Category	Appearances		Goals	Team Record
Team	Competition	Category	Start	Sub	Goals	Team Record
Syria	AFC U-19 Championship 2004 Qualifying	U-18	2	0	0	Qualified
Syria	AFC U-19 Championship 2004	U-19	6	0	0	Fourth place
Syria	FIFA U-20 World Cup 2005	U-20	3	0	0	Round of 16
Syria	AFC Asian Cup 2007 Qualifying	Senior	0	1	0	Group Stage

== Honour and Titles ==
=== Club ===
Al-Karamah

- Syrian Premier League (4 titles): 2006, 2007, 2008, 2009
- Syrian Cup (3 titles): 2007, 2008, 2009
- Syrian Super Cup (1 title): 2008
- AFC Champions League: 2006 Runner-up

=== National team ===
- AFC U-19 Championship 2004: Fourth place
- FIFA U-20 World Cup 2005: Round of 16
