= Choi Young-hoon =

South Korean footballer (born 1981)

Personal information
- Full name: Choi Young-Hoon (최영훈)
- Date of birth: March 18, 1981 (age 45)
- Place of birth: South Korea
- Height: 1.79 m (5 ft 10 in)
- Position: Forward

Senior career*
Years	Team	Apps	(Gls)
2000–2006	Jeonbuk Hyundai	80	(2)
2007–2008	Incheon United	8	(0)

International career
2003–2004	South Korea U-23	9	(1)
- * Club domestic league appearances and goals

Choi Young-hoon (Korean: 최영훈; born March 18, 1981) is a retired South Korean football player.
