= Saleh Al Menhali =

Emirati footballer (born 1984)

Personal information
- Full name: Saleh Hamad Sulaiman Al Menhali
- Date of birth: 1 January 1984 (age 42)
- Place of birth: United Arab Emirates
- Height: 1.72 m (5 ft 7 1/2 in)
- Position: Forward

Youth career
- Al-Wahda

Senior career*
Years	Team	Apps	(Gls)
2004–2009	Al-Wahda		
2008–2009	→ Al-Dhafra (loan)		
2009–2018	Baniyas		
2020–2021	Baynounah		
- * Club domestic league appearances and goals

Saleh Al Menhali (Arabic: صالح المنهالي; born 1 January 1984) is an Emirati footballer plays as a forward.
