= Fabão (footballer, born 1981) =

Brazilian footballer

Personal information
- Full name: Fábio Santos da Silva
- Date of birth: 23 February 1981 (age 45)
- Place of birth: Rio de Janeiro, Brazil
- Height: 2.04 m (6 ft 8 in)
- Position: Defender

Senior career*
Years	Team	Apps	(Gls)
2002	América-RJ		
2002–2003	Vasco (South Africa)		
2003	Ituano		
2004	Angra dos Reis		
2004–2006	Al-Ansar		
2006–2008	Al-Karamah		
2008–2009	Al-Kharitiyath		
2009–2010	Al-Ahed		
2010–2011	Al-Karamah	4	(0)
2011	Linense	4	(0)
2011	Caxias	3	(0)
2012	Linense	14	(1)
2012	Brasiliense	1	(0)
2012–2013	Nejmeh	21	(4)
2014	Atlético Sorocaba		
2014–2015	Zakho		
2015–2017	AD Itaboraí-RJ		
- * Club domestic league appearances and goals

Fábio Santos da Silva (born 23 February 1981), or simply Fabão, is a Brazilian former professional footballer who played as a defender.

== Club career ==
Fabão began his professional career with América-RJ in 2002 before having a brief spell with Vasco in South Africa. He went on to represent several Brazilian lower-division clubs, including Ituano and Angra dos Reis, before moving abroad in 2004 to join Al-Ansar in Lebanon, winning the domestic double in the 2005–06 season.

In 2006, he signed with Syrian side Al-Karamah, where he enjoyed notable success. During his first stint with the club, Al-Karamah won back-to-back Syrian Premier League and Syrian Cup doubles in the 2006–07 and 2007–08 seasons, as well as making strong continental appearances, reaching the 2006 AFC Champions League final. After short spells with Al-Kharitiyath in Qatar and Al-Ahed in Lebanon, he returned to Al-Karamah for a brief second spell in 2010–11.

Afterwards, he played for several teams across the Middle East and Brazil, including Linense, Caxias, Brasiliense, Nejmeh in Lebanon, Atlético Sorocaba, Zakho in Iraq, and AD Itaboraí-RJ.

== Honours ==
Club

Al-Ansar

- Lebanese Premier League: 2005–06
- Lebanese FA Cup: 2005–06

Al-Karamah

- Syrian Premier League: 2006–07, 2007–08
- Syrian Cup: 2006–07, 2007–08

Al-Ahed

- Lebanese Premier League: 2009–10

Individual

- Lebanese Premier League Team of the Season: 2004–05, 2005–06, 2009–10
