= Nguyễn Rogério =

Brazilian footballer

Personal information
- Full name: Nguyễn Rogério
- Birth name: Rogério Machado Pereira
- Date of birth: 8 June 1979 (age 47)
- Place of birth: Rio de Janeiro, Brazil
- Height: 1.68 m (5 ft 6 in)
- Position: Defensive midfielder

Senior career*
Years	Team	Apps	(Gls)
2003–2011	SHB Đà Nẵng	138	(52)
2012–2013	Xuân Thành Sài Gòn	35	(3)
2014–2015	FLC Thanh Hóa	11	(0)
- * Club domestic league appearances and goals

Nguyễn Rogério (born as Rogério Machado Pereira on 8 June 1979) is a former professional football defensive midfielder who spent most of his career at SHB Đà Nẵng. Born in Brazil, he acquired Vietnamese citizenship in 2009.
