= Jihad Qassab =

Syrian footballer (1975–2016)

Personal information
- Date of birth: July 13, 1975
- Place of birth: Homs, Syria
- Date of death: September 30, 2016 (aged 41)
- Place of death: Saidnaya, Syria
- Position: Defender

Senior career*
Years	Team	Apps	(Gls)
- Al-Karamah
- Al-Ahed
- Shabab Al-Sahel
- Ajman Club

International career
- Syria
- * Club domestic league appearances and goals

Jihad Qassab (Arabic: جهاد قصاب) (13 July 1975 – 30 September 2016) was a Syrian professional football defender who played for Al-Karamah and Syria national football team.

== Career ==
Qassab played for his hometown club, Al-Karamah, winning four consecutive league titles and reaching the 2006 AFC Champions League Final, only losing to Jeonbuk Motors 2–3 on aggregate.

Qassab played in Lebanon for Al-Ahed and Shabab Al-Sahel, and in the U.A.E. for Ajman Club.

== Death ==
Qassab was arrested on 19 August 2014 in Baba Amr, Homs by the Syrian authorities during the Syrian civil war. Reports claim he was executed in the Saidnaya prison on Friday, 30 September 2016.
