= Abdulrahman Akkari =

Syrian footballer (born 1984)

Abdulrahman Akkari عبد الرحمن عكاري
Personal information
- Full name: Abdulrahman Akkari
- Date of birth: 3 March 1984 (age 42)
- Place of birth: Homs, Syria
- Height: 1.78 m (5 ft 10 in)
- Position: Striker

Youth career
- Al-Karamah

Senior career*
Years	Team	Apps	(Gls)
2003–2007	Al-Karamah	–	(–)
2007	Shabab Al-Ordon	–	(–)
2007–2008	Al-Karamah	–	(–)
2008–2009	Al-Nawair	–	(–)
2009–2010	Tishreen	9	(9)
2010–2011	Al-Wahda	12	(4)
2011–2012	Al-Jaish		
2012	Manshia Bani Hassan	5	(0)
2013–2014	Tripoli	29	(16)
2014	Al-Safa		
- * Club domestic league appearances and goals

Abdulrahman Akkari (born 3 March 1984) is a Syrian former footballer who played as a striker.

== Career ==
He began his career with Syrian Premier League club Al-Karamah, scoring his first competitive goal in a 2–1 win at Al-Qardaha on 25 May 2004. The following season, he scored a hat-trick in a 5–1 win at Al-Shorta on 21 May 2005. He won the Syrian Premier League championship with Al-Karamah in May 2006, having finished as runner-up in the previous two seasons. Akkari scored a hat-trick in the match that secured the title for his team, a 4–1 win against Al-Jehad. Later that year, he helped the club reach the final of the AFC Champions League for the first time. Al-Karamah were defeated 3–2 on aggregate in the final by Jeonbuk Hyundai Motors of the K-League. Akkari was dropped for the first leg of the final before coming on as a late substitute in the second leg.
