= Haitham Simreen =

Jordanian footballer

Personal information
- Date of birth: 7 February 1977 (age 49)
- Place of birth: Amman, Jordan
- Position: Defender

Senior career*
Years	Team	Apps	(Gls)
1995–2011	Al-Wehdat SC		(1)
2009–2010	→ Al-Tilal (loan)		

International career
1998–2002	Jordan	21	(3)
- * Club domestic league appearances and goals

Haitham Simreen (born 7 February 1977) is a Jordanian retired footballer.

== International goals ==
#	Date	Venue	Opponent	Score	Result	Competition
1	2000	Lattakia	Bahrain	2-0	Win	Friendly
2	5 January 2001	Doha	Qatar	3–1	Loss	Friendly
3	13 February 2002	Ta'Qali	Lithuania	3–0	Win	Friendly
