= Abdel Kader Rifai =

Syrian footballer (born 1973)

Personal information
- Date of birth: 18 April 1973 (age 53)
- Place of birth: Homs, Syria
- Position: Midfielder

Youth career
- 1982–1993: Al-Karamah

Senior career*
Years	Team	Apps	(Gls)
1993–1994	Al-Karamah		
1994–1995	Al-Jaish		
1995–1997	Al-Karamah		
1997–1999	Al-Bourj		
1999–2000	Al-Ahed		
2000–2008	Al-Karamah		

International career
1992–1995	Syria U20		
1995–1999	Syria		
- * Club domestic league appearances and goals

Abdel Kader Rifai (Arabic: عَبْد الْقَادِر الرِّفَاعِيّ; born 18 April 1973) is a Syrian retired professional footballer who played as a midfielder.

== Career ==
Rifai's career began in the youth system of Al-Karamah before starting his professional career with the senior team. He has won many trophies in his career including four Syrian Premier League titles, three Syrian Cups, two Super Cup and helped the club reach the final of the AFC Champions League for the first time.

Rifai began his rise in the international scene at youth level and represented Syria at the 1994 AFC U-19 Championship that Syria won, he also represented Syria at the 1995 FIFA U-20 World Cup. In addition, he competed with the senior team in the 1996 AFC Asian Cup and played again for Syria in the 1998 FIFA World Cup qualification.

After retirement as a player, Rifai went to coaching in which he managed his native club Al-Karamah.
