= Jung Soo-jong =

South Korean footballer (born 1987)

Jung Soo-Jong
Personal information
- Full name: Jung Soo-Jong
- Date of birth: 1 May 1987 (age 39)
- Place of birth: South Korea
- Height: 1.84 m (6 ft 0 in)
- Positions: Defender; forward

Team information
- Current team: Mokpo City FC
- Number: 20

Senior career*
Years	Team	Apps	(Gls)
2006–2009	Jeonbuk Hyundai Motors	15	(0)
2010	Chungju Hummel	2	(0)
2010–2012	Mokpo City FC	38	(3)

International career^{‡}
2006	South Korea U-20	3	(0)
- * Club domestic league appearances and goals ‡ National team caps and goals as of 7 July 2013

Jung Soo-Jong (Korean: 정수종; born 1 May 1987) is a South Korean footballer who plays as a forward.

Jung started his professional career in Jeonbuk Hyundai. After moving to Chungju Hummel in 2010. On 20 August 2010, he joined for Mokpo City FC, with Hong Deok-Jong.
