= Hassan Ameen =

Emirati footballer (born 1985)

Personal information
- Full name: Hassan Ameen Al-Muhaizi
- Date of birth: 13 June 1985 (age 41)
- Place of birth: United Arab Emirates
- Height: 1.83 m (6 ft 0 in)
- Position: Left-back

Youth career
- Al-Wahda

Senior career*
Years	Team	Apps	(Gls)
2006–2011	Al-Wahda		
2011–2014	Al-Nasr		
2014–2015	Al Jazira		
2015–2017	Al-Wasl		
2017–2019	Al-Fujairah		
2019–2020	Khor Fakkan		
2020–2021	Emirates		
2021–2022	Masfout		
- * Club domestic league appearances and goals

Hassan Ameen (Arabic: حسن أمين; born 13 June 1985) is an Emirati footballer who played as a left back.
