= Osama Talal =

Jordanian footballer

Personal information
- Full name: Osama Talal Sabbah
- Date of birth: February 10, 1973 (age 53)
- Place of birth: Amman, Jordan
- Position: Defender

Team information
- Current team: Shabab Al-Ordon

Senior career*
Years	Team	Apps	(Gls)
1992–2002	Al-Faisaly		
2002–2006	Shabab Al-Ordon		

International career
1997–2000	Jordan	6	(0)
- * Club domestic league appearances and goals

Osama Talal Sabbah (born February 10, 1973) is a former Jordanian footballer who was a defender for Shabab Al-Ordon and the Jordan national football team until he retired and became managing director of Shabab Al-Ordon until August 2010. He then moved on to the Jordan national football team as director, taking Mohannad Mahadeen's place.
