= Mohannad Mahadeen =

Jordanian footballer

Personal information
- Date of birth: 7 April 1973 (age 53)
- Place of birth: Amman, Jordan
- Height: 1.93 m (6 ft 4 in)
- Position: Defender

Senior career*
Years	Team	Apps	(Gls)
1993–2006	Al-Faisaly (Amman)		(21)
2002–2003	→ Al-Muharraq SC (loan)		(14)

International career
1993–2003	Jordan	61	(3)
- * Club domestic league appearances and goals

Mohannad Mahadeen (born 7 April 1973) is a former Jordanian footballer, who was a defender for Al-Faisaly (Amman) and the Jordan national football team until he became managing director of his national team (2009-2010) when Osama Talal succeeded him. After, he was a board member of the Jordan Football Association, working as director of marketing and communications. In 2017, he became a sports TV presenter at AlMamlaka TV

An international friendly match between Jordan and Iraq on 8 June 2007 in Amman was the mark of his retirement in football.

== Honours ==
=== Club ===
Al-Faisaly SC (Amman)

- Jordanian Pro League

 ** Winners (10): 1993–94, 1994–95, 1995–96, 1996–97, 1997–98, 1998–99, 1999–2000, 2000–01, 2001–02, 2004–05

- Jordan FA Cup

 ** Winners (10): 1993, 1994, 1995, 1996, 1997, 1998, 1999, 2000, 2001, 2004

- Jordan Shield

 ** Winners: multiple titles

- Jordan Super Cup

 ** Winners: multiple titles

- AFC Cup

 ** Winners (1): 2005

Al-Muharraq SC

- Bahraini Premier League

 ** Runners-ups (1): 2002–03

=== International ===
Jordan national football team

- Pan Arab Games

 ** Gold Medal (1): 1999

- WAFF Championship

 ** Runners-up (1): 2002

=== Individual ===
- Pan Arab Games Best Player: 1999

== = In AFC Cup ==
- 2005 AFC Cup
