= Kim Young-sun (footballer) =

South Korean footballer (born 1975)

Kim Young-Sun
Personal information
- Full name: Kim Young-Sun
- Date of birth: April 3, 1975 (age 51)
- Place of birth: South Korea
- Height: 1.84 m (6 ft 0 in)
- Position: Defender

Senior career*
Years	Team	Apps	(Gls)
1998–2005	Suwon Samsung Bluewings	102	(0)
2006–2008	Jeonbuk Hyundai Motors	34	(0)
- * Club domestic league appearances and goals as of 15 January 2008

Kim Young-Sun (Korean: 김영선) is a South Korean footballer who plays as a defender. He is currently playing for Jeonbuk FC.

He started his professional career in 1998 for Suwon Samsung Bluewings.
