= Hassan Abbas (footballer) =

Syrian footballer (born 1974)

Personal information
- Date of birth: 24 January 1974 (age 52)
- Place of birth: Homs, Syria
- Height: 1.79 m (5 ft 10 in)
- Position: Defensive midfielder

Youth career
- 1987–1992: Al-Karamah

Senior career*
| Years | Team | Apps | (Gls) |
| 1993–2010 | Al-Karamah | ? | (?) |
| 2000–2001 | → Qardaha (loan) | ? | (?) |
| Total | | ? | (?) |

International career
| 1994–1995 | Syria U-20 | ? | (?) |
| 1995–1999 | Syria | ? | (?) |
- * Club domestic league appearances and goals

Hassan Abbas (Arabic: حَسَّان عَبَّاس; born 24 January 1974 in Homs, Syria) is a Syrian former professional football midfielder who last played for Al-Karamah in the Syrian Premier League the top division in Syria.

Abbas's career began in the youth system of Al-Karamah before starting his professional career with the senior team. He has won many trophies in his career including five Syrian Premier League titles, six Syrian Cups, one Super Cup and helped the club reach the final of the AFC Champions League for the first time. Al-Karamah were defeated 3–2 on aggregate in the final by Jeonbuk Hyundai Motors of the K-League. Three years later, he was a key factor in his side's first-ever accession to AFC Cup Final. Al-Karamah were defeated 2–1 in the final of the second most important association cup in Asia by Kuwait SC of the Kuwaiti Premier League.

Abbas began his rise in the international scene at youth level and represented Syria at the 1994 AFC U-19 Championship that Syria won, he also represented Syria at the 1995 FIFA U-20 World Cup. In addition, he competed with the senior team in the 1996 AFC Asian Cup and played again for Syria in the 1998 FIFA World Cup qualification.
