= Lee Sang-min (footballer, born 1986) =

South Korean footballer

Lee Sang-Min
Personal information
- Date of birth: 14 September 1986 (age 40)
- Place of birth: Gangwon-do, South Korea
- Height: 1.77 m (5 ft 10 in)
- Position: Midfielder

Youth career
- 2001−2005: Coritiba

Senior career*
Years	Team	Apps	(Gls)
2005	Coritiba	19	(3)
2006	Iraty	30	(4)
2007−2008	Brusque	30	(3)
2008	Rio Branco-PR	22	(2)
2008	Gyeongnam FC	20	(5)
2011	Mitra Kukar	24	(3)
2011−2013	Rio Branco-PR	45	(9)
2014	Buriram United	0	(0)
2014	Gyeongnam FC	9	(0)

International career
2006	South Korea U20		
- * Club domestic league appearances and goals as of 11 July 2012

Lee Sang-Min (Korean: 이상민; born 14 September 1986 in Gangwon-do) is a South Korean footballer who most recently played for Gyeongnam FC.

== Career ==
=== Gyeongnam FC ===
He began his senior career in one the top clubs in Brazil, the Coritiba Football Club. He made his debut at the age of 17 years old. His style of playing has been compared to PSG Brazilian midfielder Lucas Moura, with commentators praising strong, fast, technical skill with both legs.

He came back to Korea in 2008. Gyeongnam FC manager Cho Kwang-Rae wanted to contract with him, and the bid was successfully completed. Lee joined Gyeongnam FC with a new foreign player Almir and was given the number 30. He was evaluated and found to be a very good technician and hot-prospect player by his manager and coaches. He left the club in 2010 but returned four years later. As of 2017, he is not listed on any Club rosters.
