= Wang Jung-hyun =

South Korean footballer (born 1976)

Wang Jung-Hyun
Personal information
- Full name: Wang Jung-Hyun
- Date of birth: August 30, 1976 (age 50)
- Place of birth: Gwangmyeong, Gyeonggi, South Korea
- Height: 1.82 m (6 ft 0 in)
- Position: Defender

Youth career
- 1995–1998: Pai Chai University

Senior career*
Years	Team	Apps	(Gls)
1999–2004	Anyang LG Cheetahs / FC Seoul	90	(9)
2005–2006	Jeonbuk Hyundai Motors	28	(2)
2007–2009	Yantai Yiteng	16	(8)

International career
2003	South Korea	3	(0)

Managerial career
- 2018–2019: Guangxi Baoyun
- * Club domestic league appearances and goals

- Wang Jung-hyun
- Hangul: 왕정현
- Hanja: 王靜鉉
- RR: Wang Jeonghyeon
- MR: Wang Chŏnghyŏn

Wang Jung-Hyun (born October 30, 1976) is a retired South Korean professional footballer, who last played as a defender for Yantai Yiteng. He also appeared with FC Seoul and Jeonbuk Hyundai Motors.

== Club career statistics ==
Club performance			League		Cup		League Cup		Continental		Total	
Season	Club	League	Apps	Goals	Apps	Goals	Apps	Goals	Apps	Goals	Apps	Goals
South Korea			League		KFA Cup		League Cup		Asia		Total	
1999	Anyang LG Cheetahs	K-League	12	0	?	?	1	0	-			
2000	Anyang LG Cheetahs	K-League	19	7	?	?	6	2	-			
2001	Anyang LG Cheetahs	K-League	11	0	?	?	7	0	?	?		
2002	Anyang LG Cheetahs	K-League	19	1	?	?	6	0	?	?		
2003	Anyang LG Cheetahs	K-League	24	1	0	0	-		-		24	1
2004	FC Seoul	K-League	5	0	2	5	9	2	-		16	7
2005	Jeonbuk Hyundai Motors	K-League	13	2	5	0	11	1	-		29	3
2006	Jeonbuk Hyundai Motors	K-League	15	0	1	1	8	0	9	1	33	2
China PR			League		FA Cup		CSL Cup		Asia		Total	
2007	Yantai Yiteng	Chinese Jia League	13	7					-			
2008	Yantai Yiteng	Chinese Jia League	3	1					-			
2009	Yantai Yiteng	Chinese Yi League							-			
Total	South Korea		118	11			48	5				
Total	China PR		16	8					-			
Career total			134	19								
