= Milton Rodríguez =

Colombian footballer (born 1976)

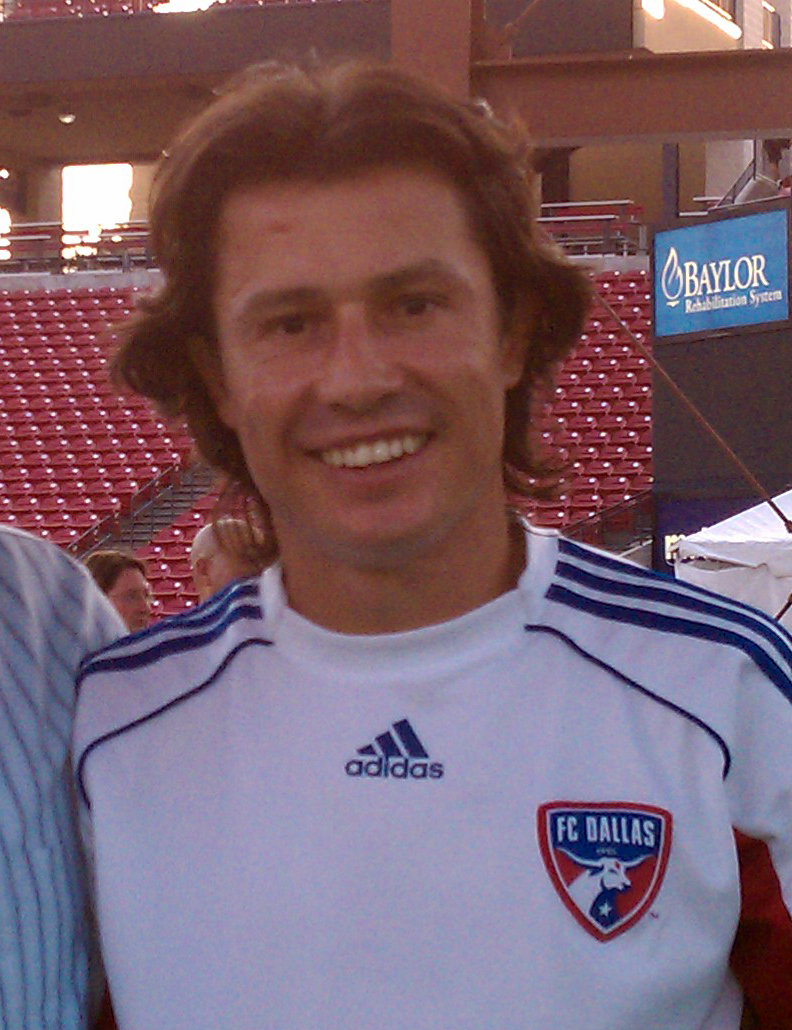

Personal information
- Full name: Milton Fabián Rodríguez Suárez
- Date of birth: 28 April 1976 (age 50)
- Place of birth: Cali, Colombia
- Height: 1.78 m (5 ft 10 in)
- Position: Forward

Senior career*
Years	Team	Apps	(Gls)
1997–1998	Cortuluá	45	(22)
1999	Independiente Santa Fe	36	(14)
2000	Cortuluá	21	(10)
2000–2001	Deportivo Cali	21	(3)
2001–2002	Cortuluá	38	(9)
2002	Deportivo Pereira	19	(13)
2003	Independiente Santa Fe	16	(6)
2003	Deportivo Cali	12	(1)
2004	Deportivo Pereira	17	(12)
2004–2005	Deportivo Cali	42	(27)
2005–2006	Jeonbuk Hyundai Motors	22	(9)
2006–2007	Newcastle Jets	21	(7)
2007	América de Cali	11	(6)
2007–2008	Deportivo Cali	32	(7)
2008–2009	Millonarios	33	(11)
2009–2010	Deportes Tolima	16	(4)
2010	Real Cartagena	16	(6)
2010–2011	FC Dallas	26	(6)
2011–2012	Atlético Huila	33	(12)
2012–2013	Envigado	28	(6)
2013	Cúcuta Deportivo	10	(1)
2014	Cortuluá	29	(4)

International career^{‡}
2004–2008	Colombia	3	(0)
- * Club domestic league appearances and goals as of January 12, 2014 ‡ National team caps and goals as of June 12, 2013

Milton Fabián Rodríguez Suárez (born April 28, 1976) is a Colombian footballer who currently plays for Cúcuta Deportivo.

== Club career ==
Rodríguez began his professional career with Cortuluá in 1997. In two years at the club the left-footed striker scored 22 goals in 45 appearances. In 1999, he moved to Independiente Santa Fe and continued his goal scoring prowess netting 14 goals in 36 appearances. The following season he returned to Cortuluá and had another fine season scoring 10 goals in 21 matches. In 2000, he would embark on his first stint with top Colombian side Deportivo Cali but would have limited success scoring 3 goals in 21 matches. In 2001, he would rejoin Cortuluá for the third time in his career and would net 9 goals in 38 appearances. Rodríguez joined Deportivo Pereira for the second half of the 2002 season and would appear in 19 matches scoring a league leading 13 goals in the Torneo Finalización 2002.

For the next few years he would continue to move from club to club playing with Independiente Santa Fe and Deportivo Cali before returning to Deportivo Pereira during the 2004 season. While with Pereira he would regain his scoring prowess netting 12 goals in 17 matches. As a result of his play with Pereira, he would rejoin Deportivo Cali and would go on to one of the most successful stints in his career scoring 27 goals in 42 matches.

In 2005, he would leave Colombia for the first time in his career and join K-League side Jeonbuk Hyundai Motors. While with Jeonbuk Hyundai Motors the Colombian striker had instant success and was regarded as a very exciting player. The following season he moved to the Newcastle Jets, who signed him a few days before the start of the 2006-07 season from K-League outfit Jeonbuk Hyundai Motors. He arrived in Newcastle ready to make his debut in Round 4 after Visa issues prevented him and his family from entering the country. Rodríguez capped his debut for the Newcastle Jets by coming on as a substitute and scoring two goals in ten minutes making him an instant fan-favorite. During this time his trademark headband became one of his most identifiable features.

He would make his return to Colombian during the 2007 season with América de Cali and would go on to score 6 goals in 11 matches. After a brief stay with América, Rodríguez would join city rival Deportivo Cali for the fourth time in his career and remain there for one season. In 2008, he would join another historical Colombian side Millonarios where he would score 11 goals in 33 matches. The following seasons he would play for Deportes Tolima and Real Cartagena and continue to score goals at a regular rate.

In 2010, he was contacted by Major League Soccer side FC Dallas and agreed to join the club in mid-season. In his first season Rodríguez would score several key goals in helping his club to reach the 2010 MLS Cup final.

Rodriguez scored Dallas's first goal of the 2011 season with a between the legs left footed shot against the Chicago Fire Soccer Club off a cross from Zach Loyd. However, he struggled for playing time and goals for most of 2011 and was released by Dallas on July 28, 2011.

== International career ==
Rodríguez has three full international caps for Colombia. Making his debut with the national team in 2004.

== Honours ==
=== Club ===
==== Jeonbuk Hyundai Mortors ====
- FA Cup (1): 2005

==== FC Dallas ====
- Major League Soccer Western Conference Championship (1): 2010

=== Individual ===
- Korean FA Cup MVP Award (1): 2005
- Korean FA Cup Top Scorer Award (1): 2005
