= Jung Jong-kwan =

South Korean footballer (1981–2011)

Personal information
- Full name: Jung Jong-kwan
- Date of birth: 9 September 1981
- Place of birth: Changwon, South Korea
- Date of death: 30 May 2011 (aged 29)
- Place of death: Seoul, South Korea
- Height: 1.73 m (5 ft 8 in)
- Position: Midfielder

Youth career
- 2000–2003: Soongsil University

Senior career*
Years	Team	Apps	(Gls)
2004–2008	Jeonbuk Hyundai Motors	61	(6)
2010–2011	Seoul United	1	(0)
Total		62	(6)
- * Club domestic league appearances and goals as of 16 August 2012

- Jung Jong-kwan
- Hangul: 정종관
- Hanja: 鄭鍾寬
- RR: Jeong Jonggwan
- MR: Chŏng Chonggwan

Jung Jong-Kwan (Korean: 정종관; 9 September 1981 – 30 May 2011) was a South Korean footballer.

He was involved in the 2011 South Korean football betting scandal.

He was found dead of a suspected suicide by hanging himself at his hotel room in Seoul.
