= Cho Jin-soo =

South Korean footballer (born 1983)

Personal information
- Date of birth: September 2, 1983 (age 43)
- Place of birth: South Korea
- Height: 1.84 m (6 ft 0 in)
- Position: Forward

Team information
- Current team: Suwon FC

Youth career
- 1999–2001: Anyang Technical High School
- 2002: Konkuk University

Senior career*
Years	Team	Apps	(Gls)
2003–2006	Jeonbuk Hyundai Motors	25	(1)
2007–2008	Jeju United	42	(5)
2009–2010	Ulsan Hyundai	20	(1)
2011–2012	Yangju Citizen	8	(0)
2013	Ratchaburi	2	(0)
2014–	Suwon FC	8	(0)

International career
2003	South Korea U-20	5	(0)
2008	South Korea	2	(0)
Korean name
Hangul	조진수
Hanja	趙珍洙
RR	Jo Jinsu
MR	Cho Chinsu
- * Club domestic league appearances and goals as of 27 November 2014

Cho Jin-soo (Korean: 조진수; Hanja: 趙珍洙; born September 2, 1983) is a South Korean football player who plays for Suwon FC in K. League.

His previous club is Jeonbuk Hyundai Motors, Jeju United and Ulsan Hyundai in the K-League.

On 2008 January 30, he played first A match against Chile in Seoul.
