= 2009–10 Syrian Premier League =

Syrian Premier League
- Season: 2009–10
- Champions: Al-Jaish
- Relegated: Afrin; Jableh
- Top goalscorer: Firas Kashosh (15 goals)

The 2009–10 Syrian Premier League was the 39th season of the Syrian Premier League. The season began on 9 October 2009 and ended on May 7, 2010.

- Al-Futowa and Hutteen were relegated from the previous season.
- Afrin and Al-Jazeera moved up from the Syrian League 1st Division.

== Team information ==
=== Stadia and locations ===
Locations of teams in the Syrian Premier League 2009-10

Club	City	Stadium
Afrin	Afrin	Al-Hamadaniah Stadium
Al-Ittihad	Aleppo	Aleppo International Stadium
Al-Jaish	Damascus	Abbasiyyin Stadium
Al-Jazeera	Hasakah	Al Baladi Stadium Hasakah
Al-Karamah	Homs	Khaled bin Walid Stadium
Al-Majd	Damascus	Abbasiyyin Stadium
Al-Nawair	Hama	Al Baladi Stadium Hama
Al-Shorta	Damascus	Abbasiyyin Stadium
Al-Taliya	Hama	Al Baladi Stadium Hama
Al-Wahda	Damascus	Abbasiyyin Stadium
Al-Wathba	Homs	Khaled bin Walid Stadium
Jableh	Jableh	Al-Baath Stadium
Omayya	Idlib	Al Baladi Stadium Idlib
Teshrin	Latakia	Al-Assad Stadium

== Final league table ==
Pos	Team	Pld	W	D	L	GF	GA	GD	Pts	Qualification or relegation
1	Al-Jaish	26	18	4	4	56	22	+34	58	2011 AFC Cup Group stage
2	Al-Karamah	26	16	8	2	40	16	+24	56	2011 AFC Cup Group stage (Note: As 2009–10 Syrian Cup winners.)
3	Teshrin	26	14	6	6	36	23	+13	48	
4	Al-Ittihad	26	13	6	7	40	29	+11	45	2011 AFC Champions League Play-off (Note: As 2010 AFC Cup Finalists.)
5	Al-Wathba	26	12	7	7	35	27	+8	43	
6	Al-Shorta	26	11	7	8	34	26	+8	40	
7	Al-Majd	26	11	7	8	36	29	+7	40	
8	Omayya	26	9	9	8	32	36	−4	36	
9	Al-Taliya	26	10	5	11	36	34	+2	35	
10	Al-Wahda	25	6	8	11	32	43	−11	26	
11	Al-Nawair	26	4	10	12	20	34	−14	22	
12	Al-Jazeera	26	3	10	13	24	44	−20	19	
13	Jableh	26	4	6	16	19	42	−23	18	Relegation to Syrian League 1st Division
14	Afrin	26	1	6	19	16	51	−35	9	Relegation to Syrian League 1st Division

Rules for classification: 1st points; 2nd goal difference; 3rd goals scored.

=== Syrian Premier League Winner ===
Syrian Premier League
2009-10 winners
Al-Jaish
11th title

== Results ==
The 2009–10 Syrian Premier League season will be played over 26 rounds.

=== Round 1 ===
October 9, 2009
16:00 UTC+3

Teshrin	3 – 0	Al-Ittihad
Ibrahim Al Hasan 80'; Abdul Rahman Akari 86'; Zyad Ajouz 90+1'

Al-Assad Stadium, Latakia
Attendance: 15,000
Referee: Shadi Asfourah (Syria)

October 9, 2009
16:00 UTC+3

Al-Majd	2 – 1	Al-Wahda
Abdulhadi Al Hariri 24', 50'		Cheikh Seck 32'

Abbasiyyin Stadium, Damascus
Attendance: 5,000
Referee: Khaled Al Agah (Syria)

October 9, 2009
16:00 UTC+3

Al-Karamah	1 – 0	Al-Wathba
Aatef Jenyat 68'

Khaled bin Walid Stadium, Homs
Attendance: 30,000
Referee: Muhsen Basma (Syria)

October 9, 2009
16:00 UTC+3

Al-Nawair	0 – 0	Omayya

Al Baladi Stadium, Hama
Attendance: 5,000
Referee: Mohannad Dba (Syria)

October 9, 2009
16:00 UTC+3

Afrin	2 – 0	Jableh
Abdul Kader Jebeli 7' (pen.); Mohamad Dhamen 89'

Al-Hamadaniah Stadium, Aleppo
Attendance: 6,000
Referee: Ayman Mahamid (Syria)

October 9, 2009
16:00 UTC+3

Al-Jazeera	0 – 1	Al-Taliya
		Firas Kashosh 44'

Al Baladi Stadium, Al-Hasakah
Attendance: 10,000
Referee: Abdullah Aryan (Syria)

October 10, 2009
16:00 UTC+3

Al-Jaish	1 – 2	Al-Shorta
Majed Al Haj 90+2'		Zyad Dannora 36'; Nabil Al Shahmeh 73'

Al-Fayhaa Stadium, Damascus
Attendance: 1,500
Referee: Omar Dhnin (Syria)

=== Round 2 ===
October 16, 2009

Al-Ittihad	1 – 3	Al-Jaish
Otobong Ene Edet 69'		Abdelrazaq Al Hussain 13'; Bwrhan Sahiwni 30'; Maher Al Sayed 51'

Aleppo International Stadium

October 16, 2009

Al-Wathba	5 – 1	Al-Jazeera
Jaja 3', 36', 81'; Wael Al Rifaie 38'; Alaa Turkawi 91'		Mowaffaq Al Ahmad 62'

Khaled bin Walid Stadium, Homs
Attendance: 4,000

December 1, 2009

Omayya	1 – 1	Al-Karamah
Samer Yazji 60'		Hani Al Taiar 85'

October 16, 2009

Al-Wahda	2 – 1	Afrin
Zyad Chaabo 68'; Qusay Habieb 86'		Abdul Kader Jebeli 31'

Abbasiyyin Stadium

October 16, 2009

Jableh	2 – 0	Al-Nawair
Marwan Alseeda 41', 82'

Al-Baath Stadium

October 16, 2009

Al-Taliya	1 – 1	Teshrin
Khaled Al Saleh 10'		Muhamad Hamadko 67'

October 17, 2009

Al-Shorta	3 – 0	Al-Majd
Anass Saari 9', 42'; Amer Alabtah 90'

Al Jalaa Stadium

=== Round 3 ===
October 19, 2009

Afrin	0 – 0	Al-Wathba

October 19, 2009

Al-Wahda	1 – 1	Omayya
Muhammad Al-Bshoo 35'		Mokawam Abaas 64'

Abbasiyyin Stadium

October 19, 2009

Al-Nawair	1 – 1	Al-Taliya
Hussam Bznko 31'		Feras Kashosh 6'

October 20, 2009

Teshrin	1 – 1	Al-Jaish
Rabeea Jumaa 20'		Jehad Baaor 46'

Al-Assad Stadium

December 14, 2009

Al-Karamah	0 – 0	Al-Ittihad

October 20, 2009

Al-Majd	5 – 1	Jableh
Raja Rafe 6'; Abdulhadi Al Hariri 8'; Samer Awadh 20'; Hamzeh Al Aitoni 67'; Ahmad Kodmani 88'		Marwan Alseeda 72'

Abbasiyyin Stadium

October 20, 2009

Al-Jazeera	0 – 0	Al-Shorta

Abbasiyyin Stadium

=== Round 4 ===
October 23, 2009

Al-Ittihad	2 – 0	Al-Jazeera
Ahmad Haj Mohamad 9'; Omar Hemidi 18'

Aleppo International Stadium

October 23, 2009

Al-Jaish	1 – 2	Al-Majd
Majed Al Haj 77'		Ali Diab 46'; Samer Awad 61'

Abbasiyyin Stadium

October 23, 2009

Al-Wathba	3 – 2	Al-Nawair
Jaja 15'; Ali Galewm 60'; Hamod Al-Hamod 76'		Bahaa Zaza 40'; Firas Teat 74'

Khaled bin Walid Stadium

October 23, 2009

Jableh	0 – 0	Al-Wahda

Al-Baath Stadium

October 23, 2009

Omayya	2 – 1	Afrin
Zakaria Hassan Bik 49', 62'		Hussen Shekle 39'

October 24, 2009

Al-Shorta	0 – 1	Teshrin
		Adeeb Barakat 26'

Al Jalaa Stadium

January 11, 2010

Al-Taliya	1 – 1	Al-Karamah
Feras Kashosh 33'		Mohannad Ibrahim 90'

=== Round 5 ===
October 30, 2009

Al-Jazeera	3 – 2	Teshrin
Mofaq Alahmed 33'; Jwan Fateme 40'; Saad Alahmed 73'		Obode Efe 10', 65'

Abbasiyyin Stadium

October 30, 2009

Al-Majd	1 – 2	Omayya
Ahmad Kodmani 75'		Samer Yazji 57', 60'

Abbasiyyin Stadium

October 30, 2009

Al-Nawair	2 – 2	Al-Shorta
Mahmoud Rahim 62', 70'		Anass Saari 4'; Basel Al Ali 40'

October 30, 2009

Afrin	1 – 4	Al-Ittihad
Kazafy Essmat ?'		Abdul Fattah Al Agha 13'; Omar Hemidi 50', 86'; Otobong Ene Edet 60'

October 30, 2009

Jableh	0 – 0	Al-Wathba

Al-Baath Stadium

January 15, 2010

Al-Karamah	0 – 1	Al-Jaish

October 31, 2009

Al-Wahda	1 – 0	Al-Taliya
Zyad Chaabo 85'

Abbasiyyin Stadium

=== Round 6 ===
November 2, 2009

Al-Ittihad	1 – 1	Al-Nawair
Ahmad Haj Mohamad 1'		Hussam Bznko 88'

Aleppo International Stadium

November 2, 2009

Al-Jaish	3 – 2	Al-Jazeera
Majed Al Haj 13', 32', 46'		Rezan Alsaleh 38'; Abd-Alkader Al-Barak 81'

Abbasiyyin Stadium

November 2, 2009

Teshrin	1 – 2	Al-Majd
Abd Al-Rahman Akkari 19'		Samer Awad 13'; Abdulhadi Al Hariri 51'

January 19, 2010

Al-Shorta	0 – 3	Al-Karamah

November 2, 2009

Omayya	2 – 1	Jableh
Zakaria Hassan Bik 19' (o.g.)		40'; Nader Harbali 82'

November 3, 2009

Al-Taliya	5 – 1	Afrin
Feras Kashosh 8', 37'; Jallal Al-Abdi 15'; Firas Alali 70', 77'		Yousef Sheeh Aleshreh 21'

November 3, 2009

Al-Wathba	4 – 0	Al-Wahda
Jaja 40'; Manhal Kousa 73'; Hamod Al-Hamod 85'; Rami Jablawe 91'

=== Round 7 ===
November 23, 2009

Al-Karamah	2 – 0	Al-Jazeera
Aatef Jenyat 80'; Mohamad Al Hamawi 88'

Khaled bin Walid Stadium

November 23, 2009

Al-Majd	0 – 0	Al-Wathba

Abbasiyyin Stadium

November 23, 2009

Afrin	0 – 3	Al-Jaish
		Abdelrazaq Al Hussain 36'; Maher Al Sayed 70'; Mohammad Alwakid 88'

November 23, 2009

Al-Nawair	2 – 2	Teshrin
Negmar Othman 26'; Firas Teat 52'		Muhamad Hamadko 4'; Abd Al-Rahman Akkari 68'

November 23, 2009

Jableh	0 – 1	Al-Ittihad
		Ahmad Haj Mohamad 55'

Al-Baath Stadium

November 24, 2009

Omayya	1 – 0	Al-Taliya
Amar Zakwor 48'

November 24, 2009

Al-Wahda	1 – 0	Al-Shorta
Qusay Habieb 11'

Abbasiyyin Stadium

=== Round 8 ===
December 4, 2009

Al-Ittihad	1 – 1	Al-Wahda
Omar Hemidi 90+2'		Zyad Chaabo 15'

Al-Hamadaniah Stadium

December 4, 2009

Al-Jaish	2 – 0	Al-Nawair
18'; Majed Al Haj 29'

Abbasiyyin Stadium

December 4, 2009

Al-Jazeera	0 – 0	Al-Majd

December 4, 2009

Al-Taliya	1 – 0	Jableh
Bakri Tarrab 86'

December 4, 2009

Al-Wathba	0 – 1	Omayya
		Samer Yazji 45'

December 4, 2009

Teshrin	1 – 2	Al-Karamah
Obode Efe 30'		Fahd Awde 14'; Mohamad Al Hamawi 63'

Al-Assad Stadium

December 5, 2009

Al-Shorta	1 – 0	Afrin
Abdou 62'

=== Round 9 ===
December 7, 2009

Al-Wahda	1 – 1	Teshrin
Zyad Chaabo 53'		Mohammed Estanbeli 23'

Abbasiyyin Stadium

December 7, 2009

Al-Majd	2 – 1	Al-Taliya
Raja Rafe 34'; Ahmad Kodmani 75'		Bakri Tarrab 52'

December 7, 2009

Al-Nawair	0 – 2	Al-Karamah
		Ahmad Omaier 19'; Richard Bohomo 25'

December 7, 2009

Jableh	1 – 4	Al-Jaish
Aadel Alzaher 32'		32'; Majed Al Haj 20'; Feras Esmaeel 45'; Abdelrazaq Al Hussain 85'

Al-Baath Stadium

December 7, 2009

Al-Wathba	1 – 0	Al-Ittihad
Maher Almoah 43'

Khaled bin Walid Stadium

December 8, 2009

Afrin	1 – 1	Al-Jazeera
Abdul-Qader Jubaili 62'		Abd-Alkader Al-Barak 47'

December 8, 2009

Omayya	0 – 2	Al-Shorta
		Younis Sulaiman 15'; Amer Alabtah 90+5'

=== Round 10 ===
December 11, 2009

Al-Ittihad	3 – 2	Omayya
Omar Hemidi 24', 90+2'; Otobong Ene Edet 32'		Amar Zakwor 39', 59'

Aleppo International Stadium

December 11, 2009

Al-Jazeera	0 – 0	Al-Nawair

Abbasiyyin Stadium

December 11, 2009

Al-Karamah	1 – 0	Al-Majd
Ahmad Omaier 15'

Khaled bin Walid Stadium

December 11, 2009

Al-Shorta	0 – 0	Jableh

December 11, 2009

Al-Taliya	0 – 1	Al-Wathba
		Baha Qaroat 84'

December 11, 2009

Teshrin	2 – 1	Afrin
Abd AL-Rahman Akkari 4'; Obode Efe 57'		Jasem AL-Nuwaiji 12'

Al-Assad Stadium

December 12, 2009

Al-Jaish	3 – 0	Al-Wahda
Maher Al Sayed 26', 67'; Abdelrazaq Al Hussain 81'

Abbasiyyin Stadium

=== Round 11 ===
December 18, 2009

Al-Majd	1 – 1	Al-Ittihad
Raja Rafe 53'		Ibrahim Touré 73'

December 18, 2009

Al-Taliya	2 – 3	Al-Shorta
Samer Nahlous 19'; 29'		Khalid Aqla 32'; Nabil Al-Shahmeh 83'; Sief Al-Hajie 90+1'

December 18, 2009

Al-Wathba	0 – 2	Al-Jaish
		Abdelrazaq Al Hussain 45'; 69'

Khaled bin Walid Stadium

December 18, 2009

Afrin	0 – 0	Al-Nawair

December 18, 2009

Jableh	2 – 0	Al-Jazeera
Wafi Darwishe 25'; Marwan Alseeda 71'

Al-Baath Stadium

December 18, 2009

Omayya	1 – 1	Teshrin
7'		Obode Efe 17'

December 19, 2009

Al-Wahda	1 – 2	Al-Karamah
Ali Rahal 15'		Mohannad Ibrahim 6', 24'

Abbasiyyin Stadium

=== Round 12 ===
December 21, 2009

Al-Ittihad	2 – 1	Al-Taliya
55'; Ahmad Haj Mohamad 83'		Feras Kashosh 43'

Aleppo International Stadium

December 21, 2009

Al-Jaish	4 – 1	Omayya
Juan Hesso 29'; Ahmad Al Salih 62'; Abdelrazaq Al Hussain 69'; Maher Al Sayed 90+2'		Amar Zakwor 78'

Abbasiyyin Stadium

December 21, 2009

Al-Nawair	1 – 4	Al-Majd
23'		Raja Rafe 43'; Ahmad Kodmani 49', 68', 84'

December 21, 2009

Al-Shorta	0 – 1	Al-Wathba
		Hamod Al-Hamod 60'

December 21, 2009

Teshrin	1 – 0	Jableh
Rami Layka 90+1'

Al-Assad Stadium

December 22, 2009

Al-Jazeera	0 – 0	Al-Wahda

December 22, 2009

Al-Karamah	2 – 0	Afrin
Mohannad Ibrahim 27'; Mohamad Al Hamawi 87'

=== Round 13 ===
December 25, 2009

Al-Taliya	2 – 0	Al-Jaish
Feras Kashosh 48', 81'

December 25, 2009

Al-Wathba	2 – 1	Teshrin
Abdul Qader Majarmsh 33'; Lisandro 71'		Manhal Kousa 58' (o.g.)

Khaled bin Walid Stadium

December 25, 2009

Al-Wahda	4 – 1	Al-Nawair
Omar Khaleil 12', 56'; Zyad Chaabo 44'; Rafat Muhammad 66'		Firas Teat 87'

Abbasiyyin Stadium

December 25, 2009

Afrin	0 – 1	Al-Majd
		Abdulhadi Khalaf 89'

December 25, 2009

Jableh	0 – 3	Al-Karamah
		Mohamad Al Hamawi 61', 72', 82'

Al-Baath Stadium

December 25, 2009

Omayya	2 – 2	Al-Jazeera
40'; Amar Zakwor 83'		31'; Ahmad Aboalam 76'

December 25, 2009

Al-Shorta	4 – 2	Al-Ittihad
Abdou 9'; Gozeah Keltshe 24'; Amer Alabtah 77'; Hussam Awad 81'		26'; Abdulkader Dakka 70'

Al Jalaa Stadium

=== Round 14 ===
January 29, 2010

Al-Taliya	2 – 0	Al-Jazeera

January 29, 2010

Al-Ittihad	0 – 1	Teshrin

January 29, 2010

Al-Wahda	0 – 3	Al-Majd

January 29, 2010

Jableh	1 – 0	Afrin

January 29, 2010

Omayya	1 – 0	Al-Nawair

January 30, 2010

Al-Shorta	1 – 1	Al-Jaish

February 5, 2010

Al-Wathba	2 – 0	Al-Karamah

=== Round 15 ===
February 5, 2010

Al-Jaish	1 – 0	Al-Ittihad

February 5, 2010

Al-Jazeera	3 – 2	Al-Wathba

February 5, 2010

Al-Karamah	1 – 0	Omayya

February 5, 2010

Al-Nawair	2 – 0	Jableh

February 5, 2010

Afrin	0 – 0	Al-Wahda

February 5, 2010

Teshrin	1 – 0	Al-Taliya

February 6, 2010

Al-Majd	2 – 1	Al-Shorta

=== Round 16 ===
February 12, 2010

Al-Ittihad	0 – 0	Al-Karamah

February 12, 2010

Al-Jaish	1 – 2	Teshrin

February 12, 2010

Al-Shorta	3 – 1	Al-Jazeera

February 12, 2010

Al-Taliya	1 – 0	Al-Nawair

February 12, 2010

Al-Wathba	1 – 1	Afrin

February 12, 2010

Jableh	1 – 1	Al-Majd

February 12, 2010

Omayya	1 – 2	Al-Wahda

=== Round 17 ===
March 8, 2010

Al-Karamah	2 – 0	Al-Taliya

March 8, 2010

Al-Majd	2 – 3	Al-Jaish

March 8, 2010

Al-Nawair	1 – 0	Al-Wathba

March 8, 2010

Al-Wahda	5 – 2	Jableh

March 8, 2010

Afrin	1 – 1	Omayya

March 8, 2010

Teshrin	0 – 1	Al-Shorta

March 30, 2010

Al-Jazeera	1 – 2	Al-Ittihad

=== Round 18 ===
March 12, 2010

Al-Jaish	1 – 1	Al-Karamah

March 12, 2010

Al-Shorta	3 – 0	Al-Nawair

March 12, 2010

Al-Taliya	4 – 1	Al-Wahda

March 12, 2010

Al-Wathba	1 – 0	Jableh

March 12, 2010

Omayya	1 – 0	Al-Majd

March 12, 2010

Teshrin	2 – 0	Al-Jazeera

March 14, 2010

Al-Ittihad	1 – 0	Afrin

=== Round 19 ===
April 13, 2010

Al-Jazeera	1 – 3	Al-Jaish

March 19, 2010

Al-Majd	1 – 2	Teshrin

March 19, 2010

Al-Wahda	1 – 1	Al-Wathba

March 19, 2010

Afrin	1 – 4	Al-Taliya

March 19, 2010

Jableh	0 – 2	Omayya

March 20, 2010

Al-Karamah	0 – 0	Al-Shorta

March 20, 2010

Al-Nawair	0 – 1	Al-Ittihad

=== Round 20 ===
March 26, 2010

Al-Shorta	2 – 1	Al-Wahda

March 26, 2010

Al-Wathba	1 – 1	Al-Majd

March 26, 2010

Teshrin	1 – 0	Al-Nawair

March 26, 2010

Al-Taliya	3 – 2	Omayya

March 27, 2010

Al-Ittihad	2 – 0	Jableh

March 27, 2010

Al-Jaish	2 – 1	Afrin

March 27, 2010

Al-Jazeera	1 – 2	Al-Karamah

=== Round 21 ===
April 2, 2010

Al-Karamah	0 – 0	Teshrin

April 2, 2010

Al-Nawair	0 – 0	Al-Jaish

April 2, 2010

Al-Wahda	3 – 5	Al-Ittihad

April 2, 2010

Jableh	1 – 2	Al-Taliya

April 2, 2010

Omayya	1 – 1	Al-Wathba

April 3, 2010

Al-Majd	0 – 0	Al-Jazeera

April 3, 2010

Afrin	0 – 1	Al-Shorta

=== Round 22 ===
April 9, 2010

Al-Jazeera	1 – 0	Afrin

April 9, 2010

Al-Shorta	3 – 3	Omayya

April 9, 2010

Al-Taliya	1 – 2	Al-Majd

April 9, 2010

Teshrin	1 – 0	Al-Wahda

April 10, 2010

Al-Ittihad	4 – 2	Al-Wathba

April 10, 2010

Al-Jaish	2 – 1	Jableh

April 11, 2010

Al-Karamah	1 – 0	Al-Nawair

=== Round 23 ===
April 16, 2010

Al-Majd	0 – 1	Al-Karamah

April 16, 2010

Al-Nawair	2 – 1	Al-Jazeera

April 16, 2010

Afrin	2 – 4	Teshrin

April 16, 2010

Jableh	1 – 0	Al-Shorta

April 16, 2010

Al-Ittihad	4 – 2	Omayya

April 17, 2010

Al-Wathba	3 – 1	Al-Taliya

April 17, 2010

Al-Wahda	1 – 2	Al-Jaish

=== Round 24 ===
April 23, 2010

Al-Ittihad	4 – 0	Al-Majd

April 23, 2010

Al-Jazeera	2 – 2	Jableh

April 23, 2010

Al-Nawair	3 – 0	Afrin

April 23, 2010

Al-Shorta	1 – 1	Al-Taliya

April 23, 2010

Teshrin	2 – 0	Omayya

April 24, 2010

Al-Jaish	4 – 0	Al-Wathba

April 25, 2010

Al-Karamah	3 – 2	Al-Wahda

=== Round 25 ===
April 30, 2010

Al-Majd	1 – 1	Al-Nawair

April 30, 2010

Al-Wathba	2 – 1	Al-Shorta

April 30, 2010

Al-Wahda	2 – 2	Al-Jazeera

April 30, 2010

Jableh	0 – 1	Teshrin

May 2, 2010

Afrin	2 – 6	Al-Karamah

May 2, 2010

Al-Taliya	1 – 1	Al-Ittihad

May 2, 2010

Omayya	0 – 3	Al-Jaish

=== Round 26 ===
May 7, 2010

Al-Jazeera	2 – 2	Omayya

May 7, 2010

Al-Ittihad	1 – 0	Al-Shorta

May 7, 2010

Al-Karamah	3 – 3	Jableh

May 7, 2010

Al-Majd	3 – 0	Afrin

May 7, 2010

Al-Nawair	1 – 1	Al-Wahda

May 7, 2010

Teshrin	1 – 2	Al-Wathba

May 7, 2010

Al-Jaish	5 – 0	Al-Taliya

== Top goalscorers ==
15 goals

- (Syria) Firas Kashosh (Al-Taliya)

12 goals

- (Syria) Abdulrahman Akkari (Teshrin)
- (Syria) Amar Zakour (Omayya)
- (Syria) Samer Awad (Al-Majd)

11 goals

- (Syria) Majed Al Haj (Al-Jaish)

10 goals

- (Syria) Mohamad Hamwi (Al-Karamah)
- (Syria) Maher Al Sayed (Al-Jaish)
- (Zambia) Phillimon Chepita (Al-Jaish)

== See also ==
- 2009–10 Syrian Cup
