= 2002 Durand Cup =

Tournament details
- Country: India
- Venue(s): Ambedkar Stadium, Delhi
- Dates: 2–16 February 2002
- Teams: 16

Final positions
- Champions: Mahindra United (2nd title)
- Runners-up: Churchill Brothers

Tournament statistics
- Matches played: 21
- Goals scored: 55 (2.62 per match)

Awards
- Best Player: Jules Alberto

The 2002 Durand Cup is the 114th season of the Durand Cup, the oldest football tournament in Asia. All matches were played in the Ambedkar Stadium in Delhi. Mahindra United defeated Churchill Brothers 5–0 in the final, in only the third time that five goals were scored by the winning team in the final.

== Background ==
This edition of the Durand Cup was scheduled to be played in the middle of the National Football League (NFL) season. Nine of the eleven teams participating in the NFL were seeded directly.

== Qualification ==
Delhi's City Club and Tarun Sangha entered the pre-quarterfinal stage after wins in their respective qualifying group stage fixtures. However, they failed to make it past that stage with Border Security Force and Army XI progressing, joining ten other teams, all of which were seeded directly to the quarter-finals.

=== Group A ===
Pos	Team	Pld	W	D	L	GF	GA	GD	Pts	Qualification
1	City Club	2	2	0	0	2	0	+2	6	Advance to Pre-quarterfinals
2	Delhi Police	1	0	0	1	0	1	−1	0	
3	EME Centre	1	0	0	1	0	1	−1	0	

Source: rsssf.org
Rules for classification: 1) points; 2) goal difference; 3) goals scored; 4) head-to-head result.

28 January 2002	City Club	1–0	EME Centre, Secunderabad
	Arjunan 91' (o.g.)

30 January 2002	Delhi Police	0–1	City Club
			Aftab Ashraf 35'

=== Group B ===
Pos	Team	Pld	W	D	L	GF	GA	GD	Pts	Qualification
1	Tarun Sangha	2	2	0	0	11	7	+4	6	Advance to Pre-quarterfinals
2	No 2 Signal Training Centre	1	0	0	1	7	8	−1	0	
3	Indian Air Force	1	0	0	1	0	3	−3	0	

Source: rsssf.org
Rules for classification: 1) points; 2) goal difference; 3) goals scored; 4) head-to-head result.

29 January 2002	Indian Air Force	0–3	Tarun Sangha
			Debasis Das 12'; Suklal Murmu 65'; Sanatan Murmu 81'

31 January 2002	Tarun Sangha	2–2 (6–5 p)	No 2 Signal Training Centre
	Aparesh Halder ?'; Debasis Das ?'		Surajit Mondal ?'; Murshed Sheikh ?'

== Pre-quarterfinals ==
Border Security Force and Army XI advanced to the quarter-finals following their wins over City Club and Indian National respectively in the final fixtures of their respective groups. Both recorded consecutive wins earning six points each and topped their groups. The Border Security Force were included in Group C of the quarter-final stage and Army XI in Group D.

=== Group I ===
Pos	Team	Pld	W	D	L	GF	GA	GD	Pts	Qualification
1	Border Security Force	2	2	0	0	7	0	+7	6	Advance to Quarter-finals
2	City Club	2	1	0	1	3	3	0	3	
3	Indian Navy	2	0	0	2	0	7	−7	0	

Source: rsssf.org
Rules for classification: 1) points; 2) goal difference; 3) goals scored; 4) head-to-head result.

2 February 2002	Border Security Force	4–0	Indian Navy
	J Joseph 33', 62'; DS Negi 52'; Santosh Kujur 75'

3 February 2002	Indian Navy	0–3	City Club
			Chettri 18'; Afroz Ahmed 76'; Shyam Kumar 89'

4 February 2002	Border Security Force	3–0	City Club
	J Joseph 30', 54'; DS Negi 61'

=== Group II ===
Pos	Team	Pld	W	D	L	GF	GA	GD	Pts	Qualification
1	Army XI	2	2	0	0	7	0	+7	6	Advance to Quarter-finals
2	Indian National	2	0	1	1	1	2	−1	1	
3	Tarun Sangha	2	0	1	1	1	7	−6	1	

Source: rsssf.org
Rules for classification: 1) points; 2) goal difference; 3) goals scored; 4) head-to-head result.

2 February 2002	Tarun Sangha	0–6	Army XI
			Thiruvakarsu 18', 39'; Saroj Gurung 26', 73'; Raghu 87', 89'

3 February 2002	Indian National	1–1	Tarun Sangha
	Cassius Owino 90'		Suklal Murmu 86'

4 February 2002	Indian National	0–1	Army XI
			Lal Sangliana 70'

== Knockout stage ==
=== Quarter-finals ===
The quarter-finals were played in a round-robin where the competing 12 teams were divided into four groups (A to D). The top team of each group advanced to the semi-finals.

==== Group A ====
Pos	Team	Pld	W	D	L	GF	GA	GD	Pts	Qualification
1	Indian Telephone Industries	2	1	1	0	2	1	+1	4	Advance to Semi-finals
2	Mohun Bagan	2	1	0	1	4	3	+1	3	
3	JCT	2	0	1	1	1	3	−2	1	

Source: rsssf.org
Rules for classification: 1) points; 2) goal difference; 3) goals scored; 4) head-to-head result.

6 February 2002	JCT	0–0	Indian Telephone Industries	Delhi
		Report		Stadium: Ambedkar Stadium

8 February 2002	Mohun Bagan	3–1	JCT	Delhi
	Barreto 43', 48', 55'	Report	Hardeep Singh Gill 10'	Stadium: Ambedkar Stadium

10 February 2002	Mohun Bagan	1–2	Indian Telephone Industries	Delhi
	Barreto 35'	Report	Okoro 19'; Mohammad Salissu 86'	Stadium: Ambedkar Stadium

==== Group B ====
Pos	Team	Pld	W	D	L	GF	GA	GD	Pts	Qualification
1	East Bengal	2	1	1	0	3	2	+1	4	Advance to Semi-finals
2	Salgaocar	2	1	0	1	2	2	0	3	
3	Punjab Police	2	0	1	1	1	2	−1	1	

Source: rsssf.org
Rules for classification: 1) points; 2) goal difference; 3) goals scored; 4) head-to-head result.

6 February 2002	Salgaocar	1–0	Punjab Police	Delhi
	Ambrose 79'	Report		Stadium: Ambedkar Stadium

8 February 2002	East Bengal	1–1	Punjab Police	Delhi
	Musah 33'	Report	Gurinder Pal Singh 40'	Stadium: Ambedkar Stadium

10 February 2002	Salgaocar	1–2	East Bengal	Delhi
	Ambrose 49'	Report	Musah 15'; Jose Carlos da Silva 38'	Stadium: Ambedkar Stadium

==== Group C ====
Pos	Team	Pld	W	D	L	GF	GA	GD	Pts	Qualification
1	Mahindra United	2	1	1	0	4	1	+3	4	Advance to Semi-finals
2	FC Kochin	2	0	2	0	0	0	0	2	
3	Border Security Force	2	0	1	1	1	4	−3	1	

Source: rsssf.org
Rules for classification: 1) points; 2) goal difference; 3) goals scored; 4) head-to-head result.

7 February 2002	Border Security Force	0–0	FC Kochin	Delhi
		Report		Stadium: Ambedkar Stadium

9 February 2002	Border Security Force	1–4	Mahindra United	Delhi
	Santosh Kujur 30'	Report	Alberto 2'; Vijayan 29'; Usman 44'; Venkatesh 84'	Stadium: Ambedkar Stadium

11 February 2002	Mahindra United	0–0	FC Kochin	Delhi
		Report		Stadium: Ambedkar Stadium

==== Group D ====
Pos	Team	Pld	W	D	L	GF	GA	GD	Pts	Qualification
1	Churchill Brothers	2	2	0	0	3	1	+2	6	Advance to Semi-finals
2	Army XI	2	1	0	1	6	5	+1	3	
3	India U-19	2	0	0	2	3	6	−3	0	

Source: rsssf.org
Rules for classification: 1) points; 2) goal difference; 3) goals scored; 4) head-to-head result.

7 February 2002	Churchill Brothers	2–1	Army XI	Delhi
	Amin Sayed Mousavi 25', 70'	Report	Lal Sangliana 73'	Stadium: Ambedkar Stadium

9 February 2002	India U-19	3–5	Army XI	Delhi
	Nabi 38'; Joiful Houzel 44'; JL Singh 90'	Report	Thirunavkarsu 40'; Prashant Jaggi 48' (o.g.); Sansel Koireng 54'; Saroj Gurung 55'; Lal Sangliana 62'	Stadium: Ambedkar Stadium

11 February 2002	Churchill Brothers	1–0	India U-19	Delhi
	Yakubu 41'	Report		Stadium: Ambedkar Stadium

=== Semi-finals ===
Mahindra United used a defensive strategy in their 3–0 semi-final win against Indian Telephone Industries by employing five defenders. It was made to counter the latter's strikers George Ekeh and Mike Okoro, and Mohammad Salissu. Anthony Pereira was included as an additional defender in place of striker Raman Vijayan. Churchill Brothers made their first final in the tournament's history after their win over East Bengal in the second semifinal. Ratan Singh scored for them in either half. The first came off the bar from Amin Sayed Mousavi's shot that Singh headed in before East Bengal equalised through midfielder Chandan Das' goal. Bengal's introduction of I. M. Vijayan yielded very little due to his poor coordination with Brazilian striker Jose Carlos Da Silva. Singh's winner subsequently came in the 86th minute.

13 February 2002

Mahindra United	3–0	Indian Telephone Industries
Alberto 62'; Venkatesh 80'; Okolo 89'	Report

Ambedkar Stadium, Delhi

14 February 2002

East Bengal	1–2	Churchill Brothers
Das 49'	Report	Singh 13', 86'

Ambedkar Stadium, Delhi

=== Final ===
It was only the second time in 25 years that no team from Kolkata had made the Durand Cup final. Mahindra United were favorites going into the final owing to fact that they were joint-toppers of the table of the then ongoing National Football League that season, and also their wins in the Durand Cup coming against tougher sides. In its preview of the match, The Hindu wrote, "A balanced side, which does not rely heavily on its two Nigerian strikers, Austin Okolo and Bala Usman, Mahindra has been served well by the winger, Jules Alberto, who has scored two goals, and Raman Vijayan." About Churchill Brothers, they wrote, "... the presence of Ghana's Yusif Yakubu and Amin Sayed Mousavi of Iran, has turned out to be its strength, though the lack of support from the others should be causing concern to coach T. K. Chathunni."

In a one-sided contest, Mahindra United thrashed their opponents 5–0 in the final. Churchill Brothers were reduced to ten men after defender Osumanu Husseni was sent off for a handball offence inside the box. Jules Alberto converted the penalty, before Khalid Siddique scored the second goal with a strike from 20 yards. Three goals were added in a span of 15 minutes in the second half; Usman converting a rebound of the opposition goalkeeper Edward Ansah taking to the tally to five.

16 February 2002
14:15 IST

Churchill Brothers	0–5	Mahindra United
	Report	Alberto 11' (pen.), 71'; Khalid Siddique 44'; Okolo 76'; Usman 81'

Ambedkar Stadium, Delhi
Referee: Rizwan-ul-Haq (Delhi)

== Awards ==
The following awards and prize money were given at the conclusion of the tournament:

Prize	Recipient	Amount
Champions	Mahindra United	₹4 lakh
Runners-up	Churchill Brothers	₹2 lakh
Semi-finalists	Indian Telephone Industries; East Bengal	₹1 lakh
Player of the Tournament	Jules Alberto (Mahindra United)	
Best Coach	Harish Rao (Mahindra United)	₹5,000
Most Promising Players	Sunil Chhetri (City Club, Delhi); Lal Sangliana (Army XI); Subhash Chowdhary (India U-19); Chandan Das (East Bengal); Tapan Ghosh (Mahindra United)	₹5,000
