= Ibrahim Hassan (disambiguation) =

Ibrahim Hassan is an Egyptian football coach.

Ibrahim Hassan, Hasan, al-Hassan or al-Hasan may also refer to:

- Ibrahim Hassan (athlete) (born 1971), Ghanaian sprinter
- Ibrahim Hassan (footballer, born 1991), Egyptian footballer
- Bouh Ibrahim (born 1997) also known as Ibrahim Hassan, Djiboutian long-distance runner
- Ibrahim Hassan, Maldives cricketer
- Ibrahim Al Hasan (born 1981), Syrian football player
- Ibrahim Al-Hasan (born 1986), Kuwaiti table tennis player
- Ibrahim Al-Hassan (born 2005), Qatari footballer

== See also ==
- Hassan Ibrahim
