= Firas Kashosh =

Syrian footballer (born 1976)

Firas Kashosh فِرَاس قَاشُوش
Personal information
- Date of birth: 10 January 1976 (age 50)
- Place of birth: Hama, Syria
- Position: Striker

Team information
- Current team: Al-Taliya
- Number: 99

Youth career
- Al-Taliya

Senior career*
Years	Team	Apps	(Gls)
1994	Al-Taliya		
- Al-Shorta
- Al-Shorta Hama
2001–2003	Al-Wathba		
2003–2014	Al-Taliya		
2010	→ Shihan (loan)	?	(5)

International career
1996–1996	Syria U-20		
- * Club domestic league appearances and goals as of 21 June 2010

Firas Kashosh (Arabic: فراس قاشوش) (born 10 January 1976 in Hama, Syria) is a Syrian footballer. He currently plays for Al-Taliya, who play in the Syrian Premier League, which is the top division in Syria. He plays as a striker, wearing the shirt with number 99 for Al-Taliya.

== Club career ==
Kashosh's career began with the Al-Taliya youth team, he went later to Al-Shorta Damascus and Al-Shorta Hama.

He finished as top scorer in the 2009–10 Syrian Premier League season with 15 goals.

Since June 2010 Kashosh was loaned to Shihan for two months. Shihan played in the Jordan League second Division. But after two games for Shihan he returned to Al-Taliya.

== Honour and Titles ==
=== Club ===
Al-Taliya

- Syrian Cup: 2007 Runner-up

=== Individual ===
- Syrian League Top Goalscorer: 2010 (15 goals)
