= 2007 Nehru Cup =

2007 ONGC Nehru Cup

Tournament details
- Host country: India
- Dates: 17–29 August
- Teams: 5 (from 1 confederation)
- Venue: 1 (in 1 host city)

Final positions
- Champions: India (1st title)
- Runners-up: Syria

Tournament statistics
- Matches played: 11
- Goals scored: 41 (3.73 per match)
- Top scorer: (Syria) Zyad Chaabo (5 goals)

The 2007 Nehru Cup International Football Tournament, also known as the ONGC Nehru Cup due to the competition's sponsorship by ONGC, was the 13th edition of the Nehru Cup a tournament organized by the All India Football Federation since 1982. It was the first Nehru Cup after a ten-year break from 1997 to 2007.

The tournament was played in the round-robin league format and the final was slated for 29 August in which India defeated Syria to claim its first title. Along with the host nation India, Cambodia, Bangladesh, Syria and Kyrgyzstan also competed in the 13-day tournament at the refurbished Ambedkar Stadium, where new floodlights had been put up specially for this tournament.

The total prize money of the tournament was $100,000. The champion team takes away a prize of $40,000, the runners-up receive $20,000 while the third place team will get $10,000. The winning team of every match received $2,500.

== Discussion ==
The Nehru Cup campaign started with an Indian 6–0 victory over the less experienced Cambodian side. India's Sunil Chhetri and Steven Dias had a great game, each of them netting twice. Baichung Bhutia had produced a wonderful performance in the match. Most of the game was played on the Cambodian side of the pitch. It was expected that India was going to take this one and they did with their second biggest recorded victory. Steven Dias was "Man of the match".

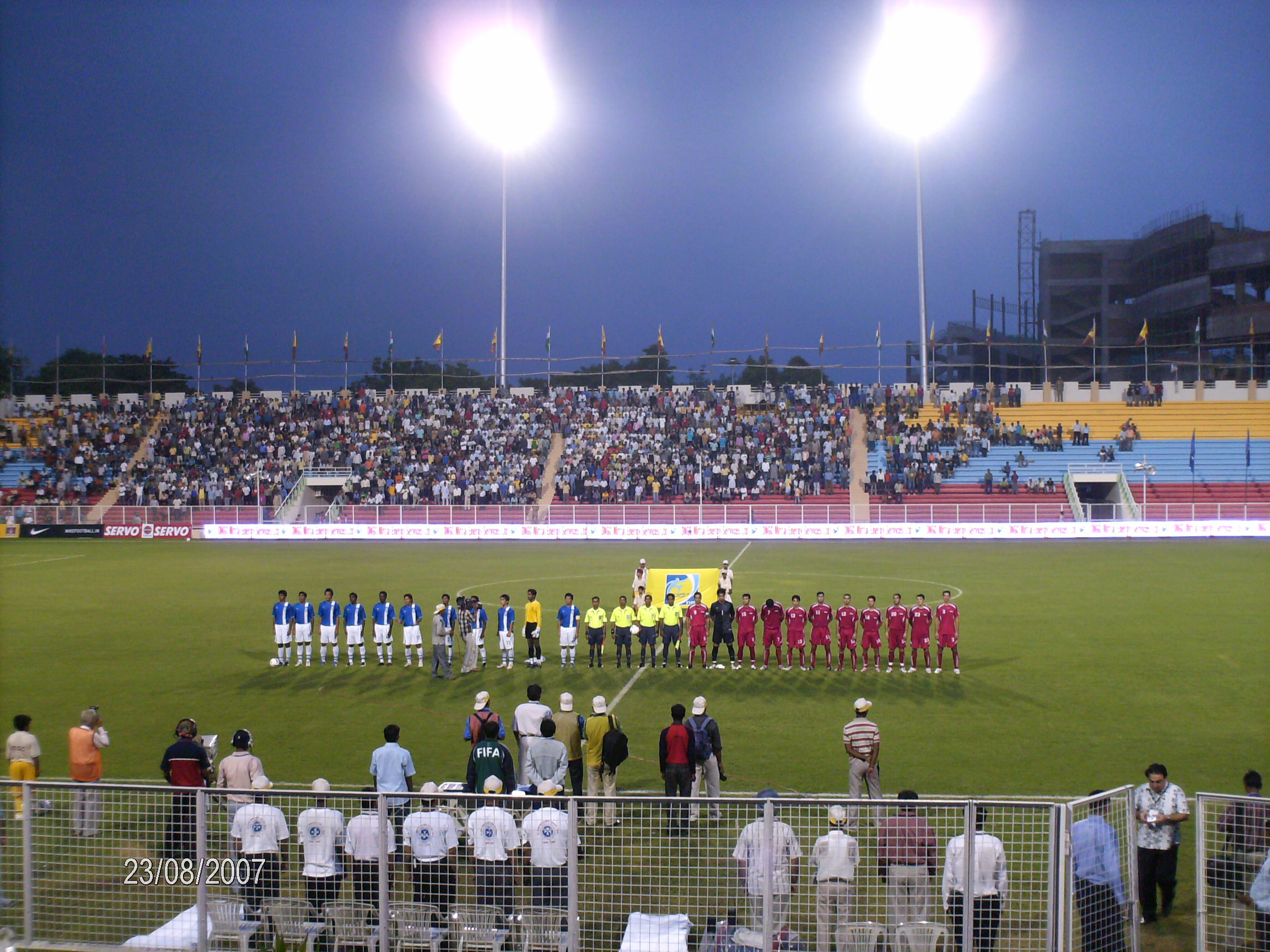
2007 ONGC Nehru Cup India vs Syria

Syria started this tournament with a 2–0 victory over Bangladesh, followed by three consecutive wins over Kyrgyzstan, hosts India and Cambodia. The four wins saw Syria topping the round-roubin standings with a perfect record of 12 out of 12 points. They experienced Syrian side was led by their best goalscorers Zyad Chaabo, who scored 5 out of 14 goals for his team and Maher Al Sayed with four goals.

Hosts India, after beating Cambodia, enjoyed another win over neighbouring Bangladesh. After losing to Syria, the decisive game for the second final spot was held between the Indian team and Kyrgyzstan. India won that game 3–0 and advanced. The goals were scored by the Indian forwards Baichung Bhutia, Sunil Chhetri and Abhishek Yadav. This defeat saw the Central Asian side finishing third, while Bangladesh and Cambodia finished fourth and fifth place respectively having played a 1 all draw in their game.

The Nehru Cup final between India and Syria was held on 29 August 2007 in New Delhi. India defeated their opponents 1–0 thanks to a goal from N. P. Pradeep and won their first ever Nehru Cup trophy. The Indian team received 40,000 US-Dollar for winning this tournament.

All games of the tournament were broadcast live by Zee Sports.

== Matches and results ==
=== Group stage ===
Teams in green field progress to the Final.

Team	Pld	W	D	L	GF	GA	GD	Pts	Qualification
Syria	4	4	0	0	14	4	+10	12	Final
India	4	3	0	1	12	3	+9	9	Final
Kyrgyzstan	4	2	0	2	8	10	−2	6	
Bangladesh	4	0	1	3	1	7	−6	1	
Cambodia	4	0	1	3	5	16	−11	1	

Source: RSSSF
17 August 2007
18:30 IST

India	6–0	Cambodia
Pradeep 16'; Bhutia 45+2' (pen.); Dias 72', 89'; Chhetri 82', 84'	Report

Ambedkar Stadium, New Delhi
Referee: Pepera Hetti Kamkanamge

18 August 2007
19:00 IST

Bangladesh	0–2	Syria
	Report	Al Sayed 48'; Chaabo 79'

Ambedkar Stadium, New Delhi
Referee: A. Arjunan (India)

19 August 2007
19:00 IST

Kyrgyzstan	4–3	Cambodia
Samsaliev 12'; Mamatov 17'; Djamshidov 48'; Harchenko 65'	Report	Sotitya 34'; Rithy 40'; Chum 43'

Ambedkar Stadium, New Delhi
Referee: Srinivasan Suresh (India)

20 August 2007
19:00 IST

India	1–0	Bangladesh
Bhutia 5'	Report

Ambedkar Stadium, New Delhi
Referee: Sikhrakar Surendra (Nepal)

21 August 2007
19:00 IST

Syria	4–1	Kyrgyzstan
Al Sayed 7'; Chaabo 44'; Al Zeno 70'; Al Hasan 82'	Report	Diab 13' (o.g.)

Ambedkar Stadium, New Delhi
Referee: Srinivasan Suresh (India)

22 August 2007
19:00 IST

Bangladesh	1–1	Cambodia
Abul 30'	Report	Kasal 90'

Ambedkar Stadium, New Delhi
Referee: A. Arjunan (India)

23 August 2007
19:00 IST

India	2–3	Syria
Chhetri 13'; Ajayan 81'	Report	Al Baba 23'; Chaabo 45+1', 65'

Ambedkar Stadium, New Delhi
Referee: Sikhrakar Surendra (Nepal)

24 August 2007
19:00 IST

Bangladesh	0–3	Kyrgyzstan
	Report	Lutfullaev 28', 54'; Djamshidov 57'

Ambedkar Stadium, New Delhi
Referee: Srinivasan Suresh (India)

25 August 2007
19:00 IST

Cambodia	1–5	Syria
Vathanak 69'	Report	Al Zeno 25'; Chaabo 35'; Al Sayed 51', 86'; Jenyat 80'

Ambedkar Stadium, New Delhi
Referee: Pepera Hetti Kamkanamge (Sri Lanka)

26 August 2007
19:00 IST

India	3–0	Kyrgyzstan
Bhutia 39'; Chhetri 60'; Yadav 90+3'	Report

Ambedkar Stadium, New Delhi
Referee: Sikhrakar Surendra (Nepal)

=== Final ===
29 August 2007
18:00 IST

India	1–0	Syria
Pradeep 44'	Report

Ambedkar Stadium, New Delhi
Referee: Sikhrakar Surendra (Nepal)

== Winners ==
2007 Nehru Cup champion

India
First title

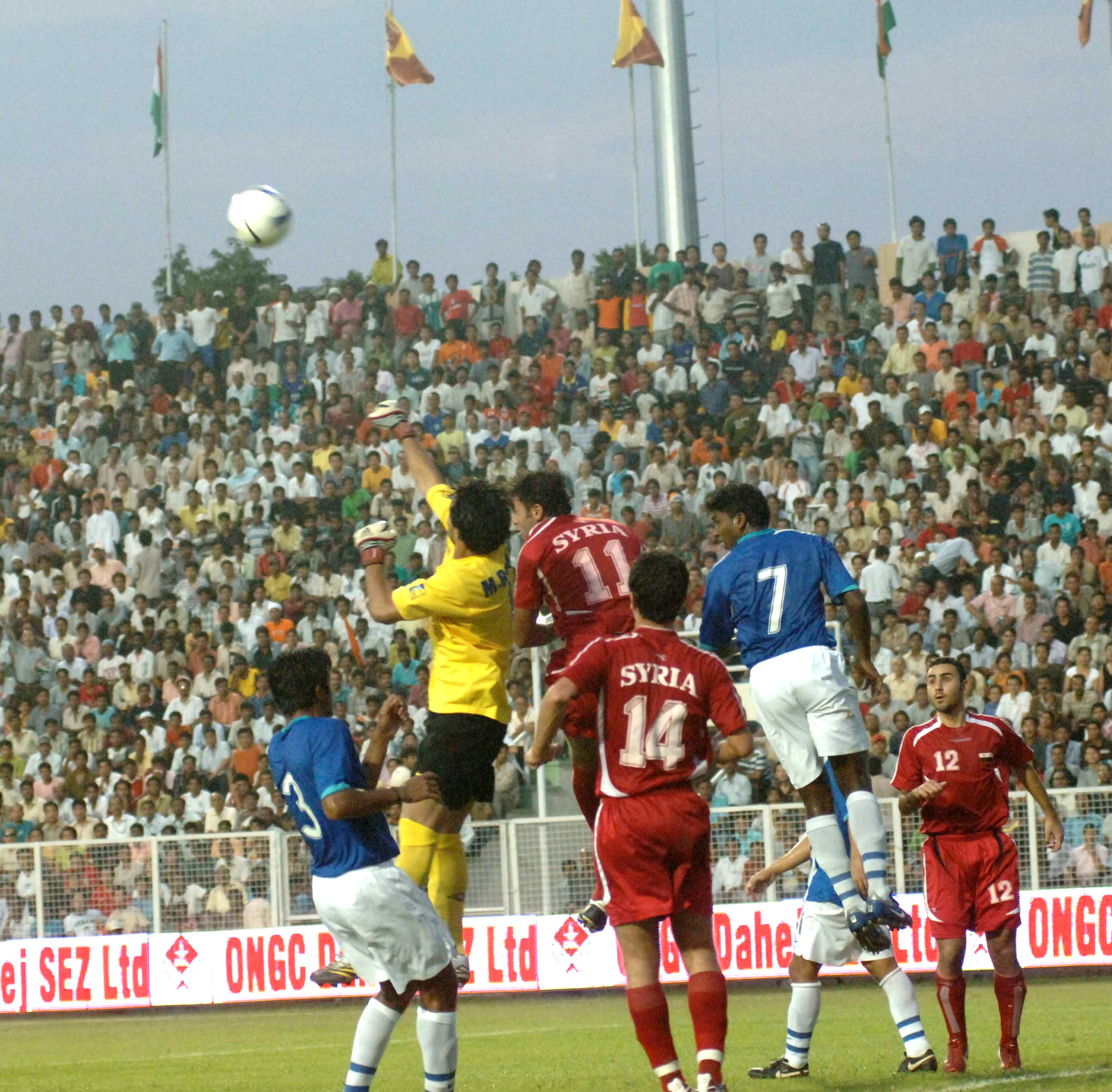
A view of match

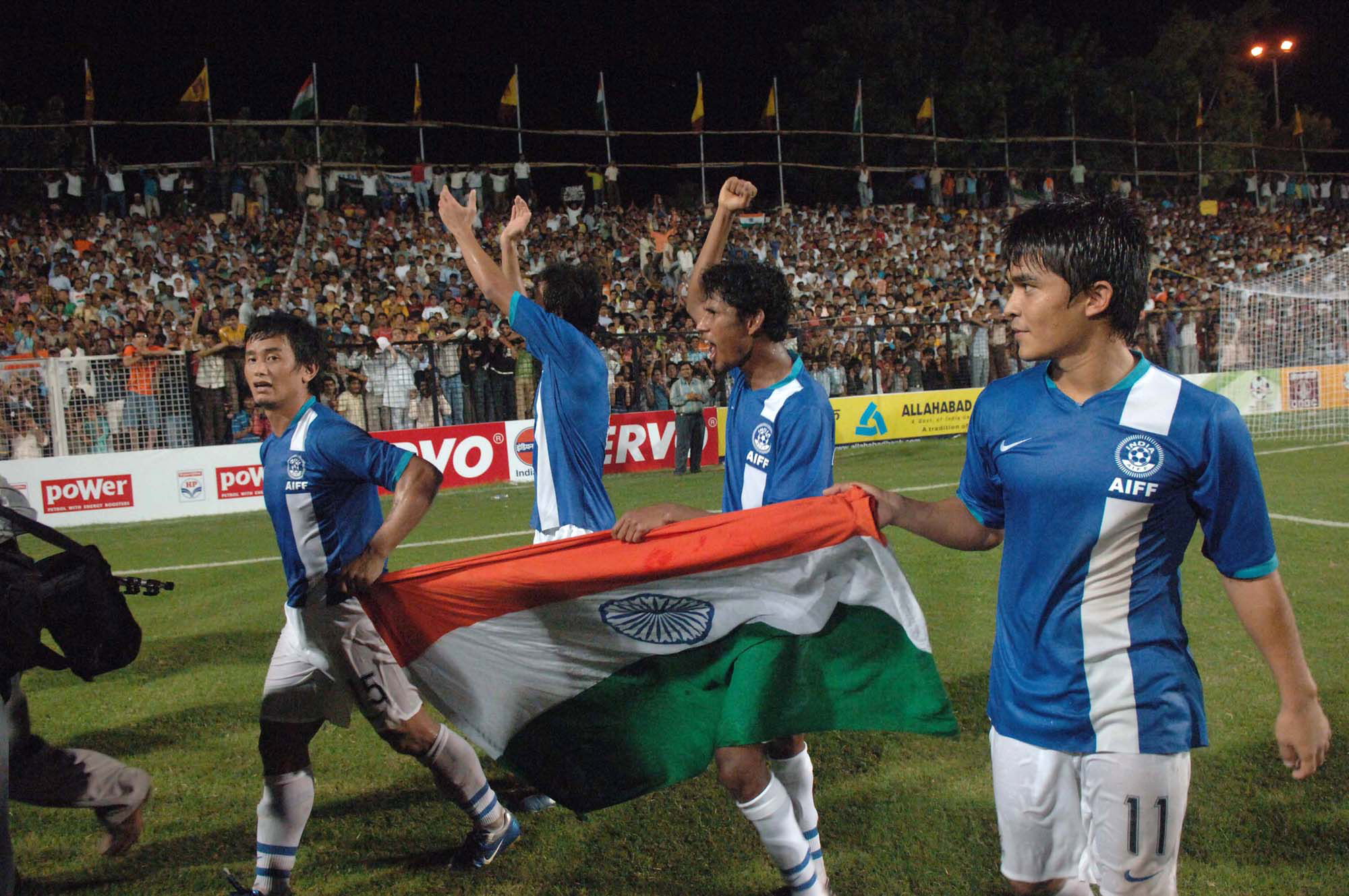
The captain of Indian Football team, Bhaichung Bhutia celebrating along with other players after winning the final

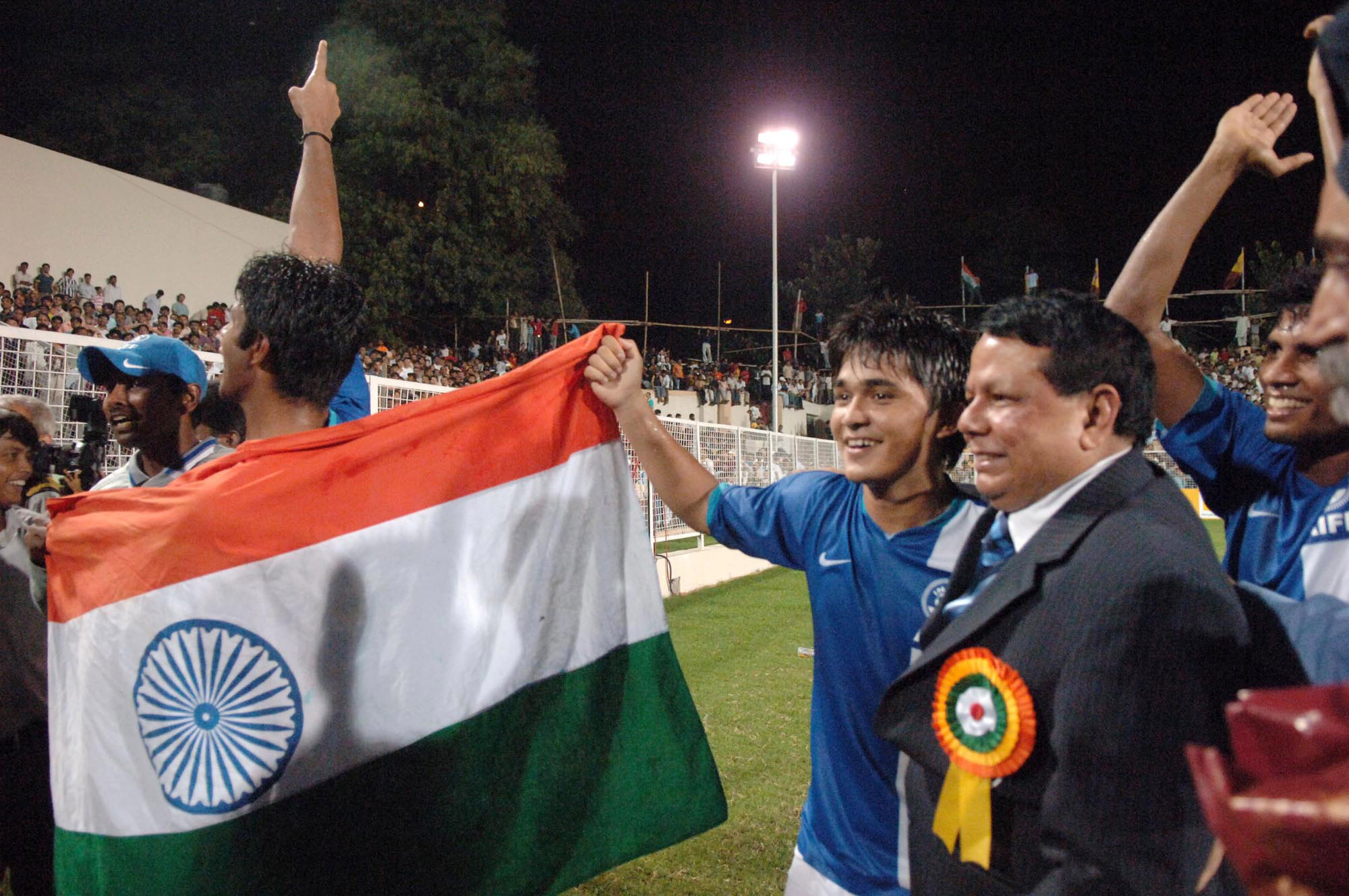
Priyaranjan Dasmunsi and the footballer, Sunil Chetri along with other players celebrating after winning the final

== Statistics ==
=== Goalscorers ===
There were 41 goals scored in 11 matches, for an average of 3.73 goals per match.

5 goals

- (Syria) Zyad Chaabo

4 goals

- (India) Sunil Chhetri
- (Syria) Maher Al Sayed

3 goals

- (India) Baichung Bhutia

2 goals

- (India) Steven Dias
- (India) N. P. Pradeep
- (Kyrgyzstan) Hurshil Lutfullaev
- (Kyrgyzstan) Ruslan Djamshidov
- (Syria) Mohamed Al Zeno

1 goal

- (Bangladesh) Mohamed Abul Hossain
- (Cambodia) Teab Vathanak
- (Cambodia) Chin Chum
- (Cambodia) Hok Sotitya
- (Cambodia) Keo Kasal
- (Cambodia) Chan Rithy
- (India) Abhishek Yadav
- (India) Krishnan Nair Ajayan
- (Kyrgyzstan) Talant Samsaliev
- (Kyrgyzstan) Bakytbek Mamatov
- (Kyrgyzstan) Vadim Harchenko
- (Syria) Ibrahim Al Hasan
- (Syria) Aatef Jenyat
- (Syria) Khaled Mansoor Al Baba

1 own goal

- (Syria) Ali Diab (playing against Kyrgyzstan)

== Man of the Match ==
- (India) Steven Dias (IND vs CAM)
- (Syria) Maher Al Sayed BAN vs SYR
- (Cambodia) Hok Sotitya (KGZ vs CAM)
- (India) Subrata Pal (IND vs BAN)
- (Syria) Maher Al Sayed (SYR vs KGZ)
- (Bangladesh) Mohamed Abul Hossain (BAN vs CAM)
- (Syria) Zyad Chaabo (IND vs SYR)
- (Kyrgyzstan) Hurshil Lutfullaev (BAN vs KGZ)
- (Syria) Mahmoud Al Amenah (CAM vs SYR)
- (India) Steven Dias (IND vs KGZ)
- (India) Mahesh Gawli (IND vs SYR, Final)
