= Mohamed Abul Hossain =

Bangladeshi footballer (born 1983)

Abul Hossain
Personal information
- Full name: Mohamed Abul Hossain Abul
- Date of birth: 29 July 1983 (age 43)
- Place of birth: Narayanganj, Bangladesh
- Height: 1.75 m (5 ft 9 in)
- Position: Midfielder

Senior career*
Years	Team	Apps	(Gls)
1997–2000	Dhanmondi Club		
2000–2002	Victoria		
2003–2006	Brothers Union		
2007–2011	Dhaka Abahani		
2011–2013	Team BJMC		
2013–2014	Brothers Union		

International career
2002–2006	Bangladesh U23		(0)
2005–2008	Bangladesh	21	(3)
Medal record
Representing Bangladesh
Men's football
SAFF Championship
Runner-up	2005 Pakistan
- * Club domestic league appearances and goals

Mohamed Abul Hossain (Bengali: মোহাম্মদ আবুল হোসেন; born 29 July 1983), is a Bangladeshi retired professional footballer who played as a midfielder. He spent an integral part of his club career with Abahani Limited Dhaka, where he won the Bangladesh Premier League title three times. Abul also won the Dhaka Premier Division League title with Brothers Union in 2003–04 and 2005.

== Career statistics ==
=== International ===
Appearances and goals by national team and year
National team	Year	Apps	Goals
Bangladesh
Bangladesh	2005	4	0
Bangladesh	2006	8	2
Bangladesh	2007	6	1
Bangladesh	2008	3	0
Bangladesh	Total	21	3

Scores and results list Bangladesh's goal tally first.

List of international goals scored by Abul Hossain
No.	Date	Venue	Opponent	Score	Result	Competition
1.	10 April 2006	Bangabandhu National Stadium, Dhaka, Bangladesh	Guam	1–0	3–0	2006 AFC Challenge Cup
2.	10 April 2006	Bangabandhu National Stadium, Dhaka, Bangladesh	Guam	2–0	3–0	2006 AFC Challenge Cup
3.	22 August 2007	Ambedkar Stadium, New Delhi, India	Cambodia	1–0	1–1	2007 Nehru Cup

== Honours ==
Victoria SC

- Dhaka First Division League: 1999

Brothers Union

- Dhaka Premier Division League: 2003–04, 2005
- National League: 2004
- Federation Cup: 2005

Abahani Limited Dhaka

- Bangladesh Premier League: 2007, 2008–09, 2009–10
- Federation Cup: 2010
