= Majed Al Haj =

Syrian footballer (born 1985)

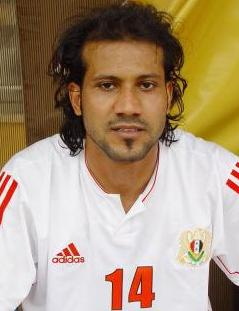
- Majed al-Haj in 2009

Personal information
- Date of birth: 6 April 1985 (age 41)
- Place of birth: Damascus, Syria
- Height: 1.72 m (5 ft 8 in)
- Position: Striker

Team information
- Current team: Al-Wahda
- Number: 14

Senior career*
Years	Team	Apps	(Gls)
2003–2011	Al-Jaish		
2011–2012	Al-Wahda		
2012	Al-Ramtha SC		
2013–2014	Al-Wahda		
2014	Ittihad Al-Ramtha		
2015–	Al-Wahda		

International career
2003–2005	Syria U-20		
2007–2008	Syria U-23		
2005–2009	Syria	11	(1)
- * Club domestic league appearances and goals

Majed Al Haj (Arabic: ماجد الحاج, born 6 April 1985 in Damascus, Syria) is a Syrian footballer. He currently plays for Al-Wahda. He plays as a striker.

== Club career ==
On 8 August 2014, Al Haj scored the only goal in a 1–0 win over Al-Jaish in the Championship Final Match, to grant his team Al-Wahda their second league title after 2004.

== International career ==
Al Haj was a part of the Syrian U-19 national team that finished in Fourth place at the 2004 AFC U-19 Championship in Malaysia and he was a part of the Syrian U-20 national team at the 2005 FIFA U-20 World Cup in the Netherlands. He plays against Canada, Italy and Colombia in the group-stage of the FIFA U-20 World Cup and against Brazil in the Round of 16. He scored one goal against Canada in the first match of the group-stage.

=== International goals ===
Scores and results table. Syria's goal tally first:

Majed Al Haj: International goals
Goal	Date	Venue	Opponent	Score	Result	Competition
1	21 March 2009	Aleppo International Stadium, Aleppo, Syria	Qatar	1–2	1–2	International Friendly

== Honours ==
=== Club ===
Al-Jaish

- Syrian Premier League: 2002–03, 2009–10
- Syrian Cup: 2002–03
- AFC Cup: 2004

=== National team ===
- AFC U-19 Championship 2004: Fourth place
- FIFA U-20 World Cup 2005: Round of 16
- West Asian Games 2005: Runner-up
