= Sunil Chhetri =

Indian professional footballer (born 1984)

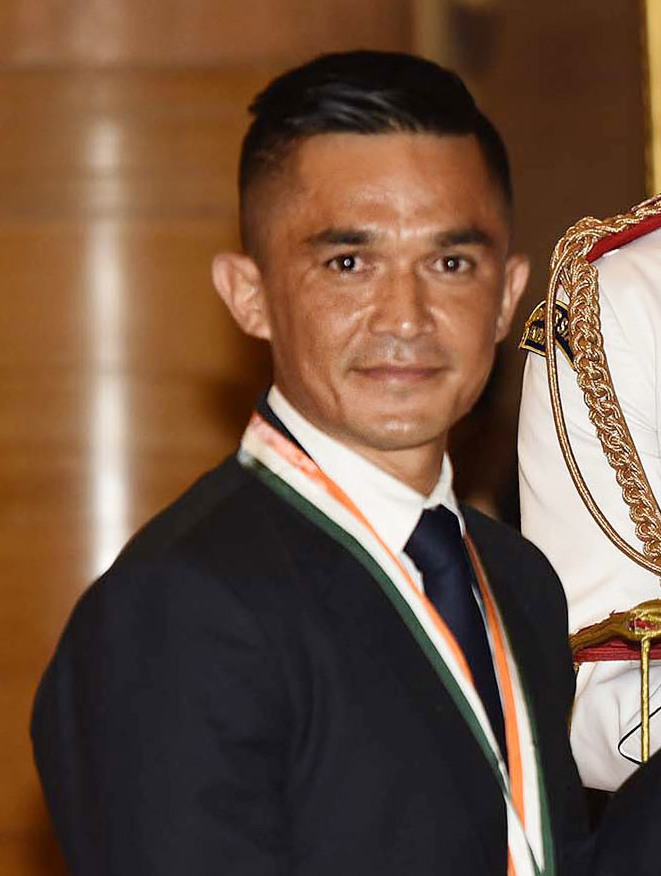
- Chhetri at President's Secretariat in 2021

Personal information
- Full name: Sunil Chhetri
- Date of birth: 3 August 1984 (age 42)
- Place of birth: Secunderabad, Andhra Pradesh (now Telangana), India
- Height: 1.70 m (5 ft 7 in)
- Position: Forward

Team information
- Current team: Bengaluru
- Number: 11

Youth career
- 2001–2002: City Club Delhi

Senior career*
| Years | Team | Apps | (Gls) |
| 2002–2005 | Mohun Bagan | 18 | (10) |
| 2005–2008 | JCT | 48 | (21) |
| 2008–2009 | East Bengal | 17 | (9) |
| 2009–2010 | Dempo | 13 | (8) |
| 2010 | Kansas City Wizards | 0 | (0) |
| 2011 | Chirag United | 7 | (7) |
| 2011–2012 | Mohun Bagan | 14 | (6) |
| 2012–2013 | Sporting CP B | 3 | (0) |
| 2013 | → Churchill Brothers (loan) | 8 | (4) |
| 2013–2015 | Bengaluru | 43 | (16) |
| 2015–2016 | Mumbai City | 15 | (7) |
| 2016 | → Bengaluru (loan) | 14 | (5) |
| 2017– | Bengaluru | 179 | (67) |

International career
| 2004 | India U20 | 3 | (2) |
| 2004–2005 | India U23 | 6 (Note: Appearances as an overage player (four appearances and two goals in 2022 Asian Games)) | (2) |
| 2005–2025 | India | 157 (Note: Chhetri retired from the national team in 2024, but returned in 2025, and remained until his definitive retirement later that year.) | (95) |
Medal record
Men's football
Representing India
AFC Challenge Cup
| Winner | 2008 India | Team |
SAFF Championship
| Runner-up | 2008 Maldives & Sri Lanka |
| Winner | 2011 India |
| Runner-up | 2013 Nepal |
| Winner | 2015 India |
| Winner | 2021 Maldives |
| Winner | 2023 India |
South Asian Games
| Silver medal – second place | 2004 Pakistan | Team |
- * Club domestic league appearances and goals as of 16:30, 12 April 2025 (UTC)

Sunil Chhetri (Note: Nepali: [sunil t͡sʰet̪ri]) (born 3 August 1984) is an Indian professional footballer who plays as a forward for and captains the Indian Super League club Bengaluru. He is the all-time top scorer in ISL history, the fourth-highest international goalscorer, and the most-capped player and all-time top goalscorer of the India national team. He is known for his pace, technique, and dribbling ability.

Chhetri began his professional career at Mohun Bagan in 2002, moving to JCT where he scored 21 goals in just 48 games. Sunil was part of Delhi team in the 59th edition of Santosh Trophy held at Delhi. He scored six goals in that tournament including a hat-trick against Gujarat. Delhi lost to Kerala in the quarter-finals and he scored in that match too. He signed for Major League Soccer side Kansas City Wizards in 2010, becoming the third player from the subcontinent of note to go abroad. He returned to India's I-League where he played for Chirag United and Mohun Bagan before going back abroad, at Sporting CP of the Primeira Liga, where he played for the club's reserve side.

Chhetri helped India win the 2007, 2009, and 2012 Nehru Cup, as well as the 2011, 2015, 2021 and 2023 SAFF Championship. He also led India to victory in the 2008 AFC Challenge Cup, which qualified them to their first AFC Asian Cup in 27 years, scoring twice in the final tournament in 2011. In 2016, Chhetri led Bengaluru FC to a silver medal finish in the AFC Cup. Chhetri has also been named AIFF Player of the Year a record seven times in 2007, 2011, 2013, 2014, 2017, 2018–19 and 2021–22.

Chhetri received the Arjuna Award in 2011 for his outstanding sporting achievement, the Padma Shri award in 2019, India's fourth highest civilian award. In 2021, he received the Khel Ratna Award, India's highest sporting honor and became the first footballer to receive the award. He announced his retirement from all forms of international football in June 2024, playing his last match for India against Kuwait. On 6 March 2025 though, it was announced that Chhetri had come out of international retirement to help the national team.

His goal tally also ranks him fourth in the all-time list among international goal-scorers, behind Cristiano Ronaldo, Lionel Messi and Ali Daei.

== Personal life ==
Sunil Chhetri was born on 3 August 1984 to Indian Gorkha father K. B. Chhetri, an officer in the Corps of Electronics and Mechanical Engineers of the Indian Army, and Nepalese mother Sushila Chhetri in Secunderabad, India. His father played football for the Indian Army football team while his mother and her twin sister played for the Nepal women's national team. He spent most of his childhood in Darjeeling. Chhetri spent his childhood at Pashupati Fatak when he was a student of Bethany School, Darjeeling. He started playing football from a young age taking part in various tournaments. Chhetri speaks five languages fluently: English, Hindi, Nepali, Bengali and Kannada. He can also understand some Telugu, Marathi and Konkani.

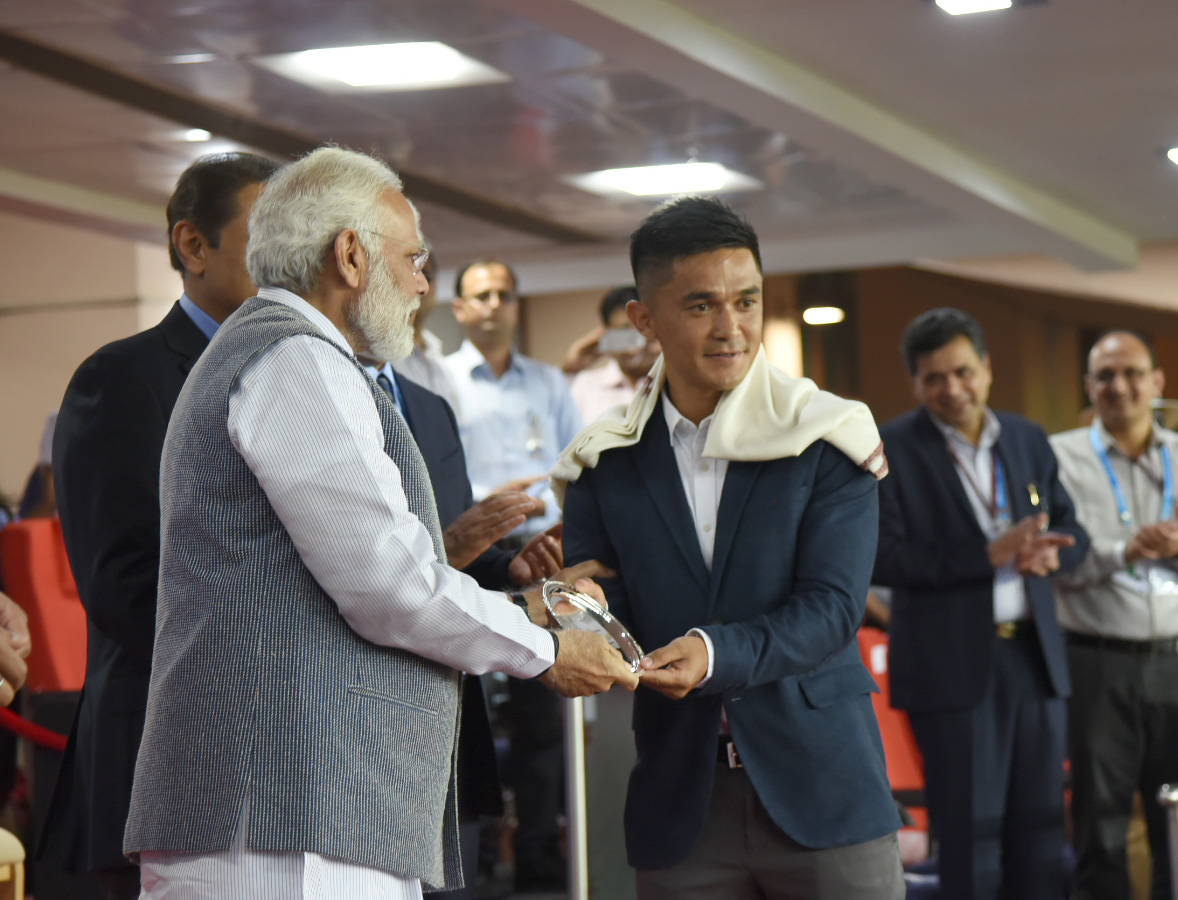
Chhetri being felicitated by the Prime Minister of India, Narendra Modi, at the beginning of 2017 FIFA U-17 World Cup in New Delhi.

On 4 December 2017, Chhetri married his long time girlfriend Sonam Bhattacharya who is the daughter of former Indian international and Mohun Bagan player Subrata Bhattacharya. Sunil Chhetri was named an 'Asian Icon' by AFC on his 34th birthday in 2018. He signed a 3-year deal with global sports giant Puma starting from 2020.

On 27 September 2022, FIFA launched a documentary on FIFA+, of three episodes named 'Captain Fantastic', which documents his pre-teen anguish, his debut for India aged 20, his romance with his future wife and his early days and peak as a football player. The 39-year-old footballer welcomed his son Dhruv with his wife Sonam Bhattacharya on 31 August 2023.

== Club career ==
=== City Club Delhi ===
Sunil Chhetri started his career with City Club, a local club based in Delhi and joined them during the 2001–02 season. He represented the club in 2002 Durand Cup where although his team failed to qualify for quarterfinal stage, Chhetri made an appearance in four games and scored a goal. He was named one of the five promising players of the tournament. He was spotted by Mohun Bagan during the tournament, who called him to Kolkata for a trial and he went for trial just after joining City Club two months ago.

=== Mohun Bagan ===
Chhetri began his professional football journey with Mohun Bagan of the National Football League where he signed his first professional contract after a week trial. After his first season with the club, the 2002–03 season, Chhetri had scored four goals as Mohun Bagan finished in seventh place in the table. The next season, Chhetri scored only two goals. The first came against Sporting Goa while the second came against Indian Bank as Mohun Bagan once again finished in the bottom half of the table, in ninth place. In 2004–05 season, He scored a hattrick against Tollygunge Agragami where he came as a substitute in a 4–0 win.; this time Mohun Bagan finished eighth in the league and remained in the National Football League on goal difference.

=== JCT ( Jagatjit Cotton FC ) ===
In 2005, Chhetri signed for JCT for the 2005–06 season. During that season, Chhetri scored three goals. He scored twice against Salgaocar before the third came against Sporting Goa, as JCT finished the season that year in sixth place. Meanwhile, in the Santosh Trophy, Chhetri scored two hat-tricks for Delhi in the group stages of the 61st Santosh Trophy against both Orissa and Railways. However, despite Chhetri's best efforts, Delhi were eliminated in the pre-quarter final round after losing 1–0 to Tamil Nadu in extra time.

Then, during the 2006–07 season, Chhetri scored a total of twelve goals in the league for JCT as the club finished in second place, behind Dempo. Among his best games during that season were the matches against his former club Mohun Bagan and Dempo in which he scored braces in both matches as JCT won both games 2–0 and 3–2 respectively.

He made his I-League debut on 26 November 2007 in an upset 2–1 victory over his former club Mohun Bagan. Then, during the very first season of the I-League, Chhetri scored seven goals as JCT finished the season in third place. His only brace that season came against Salgaocar during the final match of the season. Midway through that season though, in December 2007, Chhetri was awarded the AIFF Player of the Year award for 2007 for his excellent form and performances for his club and country.

==== Interest abroad ====
"Of course, I would love to play in Europe like [David] Villa and it all depends where I get an offer from. England would certainly be fine and I have had talks but the stumbling blocks are the work permit restrictions."

— —Sunil Chhetri, stating his desire to move abroad to play alongside Spanish striker David Villa.

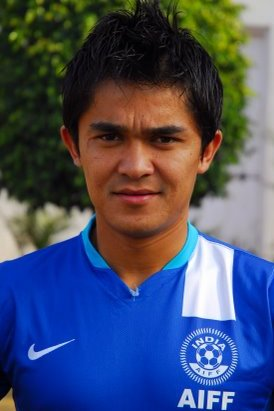
Chhetri in 2008

In October 2008, it was rumored that Chhetri had sparked interest from foreign clubs. These clubs were Leeds United of the Football League One and Estoril Praia of the Liga de Honra, the second division of Portugal. During an interview Chhetri said that "Nothing has been confirmed as yet but yes, I think I am close to getting there." indicating that there was a chance of him signing in England. However, in the end, a move never materialized.

=== East Bengal ===
Before the 2008–09 season began, Chhetri signed with fellow I-League side East Bengal. He scored on his debut for East Bengal against Chirag United on 26 September 2008 in which he scored in the 28th minute as East Bengal won the match 3–1.

Chhetri then went on to score a crucial goal for East Bengal during the Federation Cup in which he scored the only goal against his former club, JCT, which led to East Bengal booking a place in the semi-finals. During the semi-final match, East Bengal took on arch-rivals and another of Sunil's former clubs, Mohun Bagan, in which he missed the decisive penalty in the penalty shootout as East Bengal were officially knocked-out of the tournament.

Midway through the season though, reports came out suggesting that two Major League Soccer teams were interesting in Chhetri, along with his international teammate Steven Dias. These two MLS sides were rumored to be the Los Angeles Galaxy and D.C. United. However, on 25 January 2009, Chhetri arrived in Coventry, England to begin a trial at Coventry City of the Football League Championship, thus rejecting MLS. Four days later though, Coventry City manager Chris Coleman said that they would not be following their interest in Chhetri. Four months later though, Chhetri said that he would go back to Coventry City in June 2009 for another extended trial. That never materialized however.

=== Dempo ===
Upon being released by East Bengal, Chhetri signed a two-year contract with another fellow I-League side, Dempo on 22 May 2009. In his contract was a clause which allowed him to leave for trials abroad in the future if he wanted to.

==== More foreign interest ====
On 7 August 2009 it was reported that Scottish Premier League side Celtic were linked with a move to sign Chhetri. The Scottish club had watched Chhetri during a pre-season friendly with Santboià, a Segunda División B side, in a pre-season fixture. Yogesh Joshee, Chhetri's agent, was quoted as saying, "I'm waiting to get feedback from Celtic, who saw him on Monday by head scout and then another scout came to watch game, I'll let you know the outcome when I know."

Then on 30 August 2009 it was announced by the Hindustan Times that Chhetri had signed a three-year contract with English Football League Championship side Queens Park Rangers but that he was denied a work permit by the British government. According to an article on the Football Players' Association of India's official website, Chhetri was denied a work permit because India were not in the top 70 of the FIFA World Rankings. Chhetri, however, remained positive: "But it's not the end of the world. I will still continue to work hard for my country and my club Dempo, who have been very supportive."

Chhetri made his debut for Dempo against Air India on 14 September in a Durand Cup fixture, scoring a penalty in a 4–1 win.

=== Kansas City ===
In March 2010 it was announced that Chhetri was on trial with the Kansas City Wizards of Major League Soccer and that he had played during their pre-season games. He then formally signed for the team on 24 March 2010, becoming just the third Indian to play outside of South Asia and the first Indian to play in MLS. Peter Vermes, the head coach of the Wizards, was quoted as saying "One thing we really like about Sunil is that he's a crafty player. Technically he's very sharp, and he's a guy that has good attacking tendencies."

On 4 April 2010, he scored a hat-trick in Kansas City Wizards' reserves 5–0 victory over Evansville Purple Aces. On 14 April 2010, Chhetri made his debut for the Wizards in a U.S. Open Cup qualification play-in game against the Colorado Rapids. He started but earned a yellow card and was substituted out of the game at half-time; Kansas City lost the match 1–2. On 23 July 2010, it was announced that Chhetri would play in a mid-season friendly against Manchester United. The decision was criticised as a public relations exercise rather than one made on merit, as he had not yet played a league match. On 25 July 2010, Chhetri made an appearance for the Wizards against Manchester United, coming on as a substitute for Teal Bunbury in the 69th minute as Kansas City won the match 2–1.

The next day, it was announced that Chhetri was to compete for the India national team until the end of the 2011 AFC Asian Cup. The Wizards (who had been renamed Sporting Kansas City) announced on 5 February 2011 that Chhetri had officially left the team.

=== Chirag United ===
On 10 February 2011, it was announced that Chirag United had beaten United Sikkim to the signing of Sunil Chhetri for the rest of the 2010–11 I-League season. On 3 April 2011, Chhetri scored his first goal for Chirag United against Dempo, however, Dempo won the match 4–2. Chhetri then scored a brace on 29 April 2011 against ONGC to help salvage a 2–2 draw for Chirag.

=== Mohun Bagan ===
On 22 July 2011, it was announced by I-League club Mohun Bagan that Chhetri had rejoined the club and signed a one-year deal. He made his debut on 23 October 2011 in 2011-12 I-League opening game against Pailan Arrows where he started the game in a 3–1 victory. On 6 November, he scored his first goals when he struck twice in a thumping 5–1 win over Mumbai FC.

=== Sporting CP B ===
On 4 July 2012, it was reported that Chhetri had signed a two-year contract with Sporting CP and would play in their reserve team. He made his debut for the side in a Segunda Liga match against Freamunde in which he came on in the 85th minute as Sporting CP B won the match 2–0.

==== Loan to Churchill Brothers ====
On 13 February 2013, it was announced that in order to get more playing time Chhetri would be loaned out to Churchill Brothers in the I-League for the remainder of the season. He made his debut for Churchill Brothers on 21 February 2013 against Dempo in the first game of 2012–13 Goa Professional League season championship round in which Chhetri started and scored a brace in a 2–0 win. He made his continental debut on 26 February 2013 against Kitchee in the 2013 AFC Cup in which Chhetri started as Churchill Brothers lost 0–3. He then scored his first goal for Churchill Brothers in their next match against Semen Padang on 12 March 2013 in which he started and scored in the 27th minute as Churchill Brothers drew the match 2–2. After the season ended, Chhetri had scored four goals in eight league matches as he helped Churchill Brothers to their second ever I-League title.

=== Bengaluru ===
==== 2013–14 ====
On 19 July 2013, following his release from Sporting CP, Chhetri signed with new direct-entry I-League side Bengaluru for the 2013–14 season. He made his debut for the club in their opening game on 22 September 2013 against Mohun Bagan in which he came on as a 46th-minute substitute for Beikhokhei Beingaichho as Bengaluru managed a 1–1 draw. Chhetri then scored his first goal for the side in the next game against Rangdajied United in which he found the net in the 67th minute as Bengaluru won 3–0.

He did not score again for Bengaluru till November when, on the 2nd against Mumbai, Chhetri scored from the penalty-spot in the 57th minute to help Bengaluru FC to a 2–2 draw. He then scored his first brace of the season against on 1 December 2013 against Shillong Lajong in which his 7th and 34th-minute strikes helped the team to a 2–1 victory. Then in the next match against former club Churchill Brothers Chhetri scored another brace as he led Bengaluru FC to a 3–1 victory. He then scored his third brace in a row in the very next match against Mohammedan as he led Bengaluru FC to a 3–2 win in Kolkata.

Chhetri then finished off an impressive first half of the season for Bengaluru with a goal from the penalty spot against Salgaocar, his ninth of the season, as he led the Bangalore side to a 2–1 victory. He then scored another goal in the team's first Federation Cup match against Sporting Goa as Bengaluru FC won 5–3 on 15 January 2014. With 14 goals and 7 assist in 23 appearances in the season, Chhetri led Bengaluru FC to their first ever I-League title in its debut season.

==== 2014–15 ====
Chhetri began the season in the 2014 Durand Cup, playing and scoring three times but missed the penalty in the shoot-out in the semi-final against Salgaocar which turned out to be the decisive penalty miss as Bengaluru crashed out.

Chhetri scored a brace in his side's first match of 2014–15 Federation Cup against Salgaocar in a match which eventually ended 3–2 in his side's favor. Chhetri scored another brace in the last group stage match of the cup against Pune, scoring one from open play and one from the penalty spot and thus leading his side to the semi-final. He kept up his form in the semi-final against Sporting Goa and assisted Sean Rooney for the first goal and scored the second goal in a match which ended 3–0 in his side's favor. Chhetri scored his 6th goal of the tournament in the final, thus helping them win the 2014–15 Federation Cup. Sunil scored his first goal of the 2014–15 season in the 7th round away to Mohun Bagan from a Eugeneson Lyngdoh cross but couldn't prevent his team from going down 4–1. The CEO of Bengaluru FC, Parth Jindal confirmed that Chhetri along with Robin Singh and Thoi Singh will become contracted to the Indian Super League at the end of the season, to join the ISL team that drafts them in, but an arrangement has been agreed that they will be loaned back to Bengaluru for the next I-League season.

=== Mumbai City ===
Chhetri was picked up by Mumbai City during the 2015 Indian Super League for ₹1.2 crores, making him the most expensive Indian player at the auctions. He missed his team's first and second round matches in the 2015 Indian Super League through national team commitments, playing against Turkmenistan and Oman in Group D of the 2018 World Cup qualifiers, but returned against Chennaiyin in a 2–0 loss. He scored twice in his second game of the season against Roberto Carlos lead Delhi Dynamos in a 2–0 win, the first for his team in the season before scoring again, from the penalty spot, in the very next game against then table toppers Goa managed by Zico. Chhetri made history, becoming the first Indian player to score a hat-trick, in his fourth game of the season, against NorthEast United and taking his total of the season to 6 goals in 4 games. he was the top scorer for Mumbai City for that season as he poached 7 Goals. fast forward to 2018 he was still the pole position of all-time top scorers for Mumbai City FC. he came back in Mumbai colors for 2015–16 season, the team done well this time as they reached playoffs for first time, but national commitments & less game time with the likes of Diego Forlán & Sony Norde kept him away from score sheet. After two seasons with the islanders, he signed a three-year contract which made him the highest-paid Indian player in 2017.

=== Return to Bengaluru ===
==== 2015–16 ====
Chhetri was loaned out to Bengaluru for the 2015–16 I-League season, where he ended up scoring 5 times in the league, thus helping his team win the league title for the second time in three years. He also scored twice in a round of 16 match against Kitchee in the 2016 AFC Cup, helping his side to an unlikely 2–3 win away from home. This would be the first time Bengaluru had reached the quarter-finals of the tournament.

==== 2016–17 ====
On 9 June 2016, Bengaluru announced that Chhetri had signed a one-year contract at the club, thus reverting his ownership rights to the club from Mumbai City. Chhetri scored twice as Bengaluru won the 2016 AFC Cup semi-final tie by beating Johor Darul Ta'zim in Bengaluru. Chhetri's second goal was a 30-yard strike, where he received the ball from C. K. Vineeth, beat one defender and unleashed a screamer to give Bengaluru the lead.

==== 2017–present ====
He scored 14 goals for the club during the 2017–18 Indian Super League and became the top Indian scorer of the league. He was also the second top scorer for Bengaluru in the league and won the Hero of the League. In 2018, Chhetri won the Indian Super Cup with Bengaluru FC. With 9 goals, he was their top scorer during their 2018–19 season in Indian Super League and helped to win the league title. Chhetri was Bengaluru's topscorer during their 2019–20 campaign. During the following season, he scored eight goals and thus became the top scorer for the club for the third consecutive season. On 15 February 2021, Chhetri became the first player to make 200 appearances for Bengaluru FC. He scored his 100th goal for the club in the final league match of the 2020–21 Indian Super League against Jamshedpur on 25 February 2021. On 20 June, it was announced that Chhetri had signed a two-year contract extension until 2023. He won the 2022 edition of Durand Cup with the team.

On 3 March 2023, Chhetri scored a controversial goal against Kerala Blasters FC in the knockout match of ISL 2022–23 season which led to the Blasters team walking out and the game forfeited in favour of Bengaluru.

On 7 December 2024, Chhetri scored a hat-trick against Kerala Blasters, breaking Bartholomew Ogbeche's record to become the oldest player to score an Indian Super League hat-trick.

On 26 July 2026, Chhetri signed a one-year contract extension with Bengaluru ahead of 2026–27 season.

== International career ==
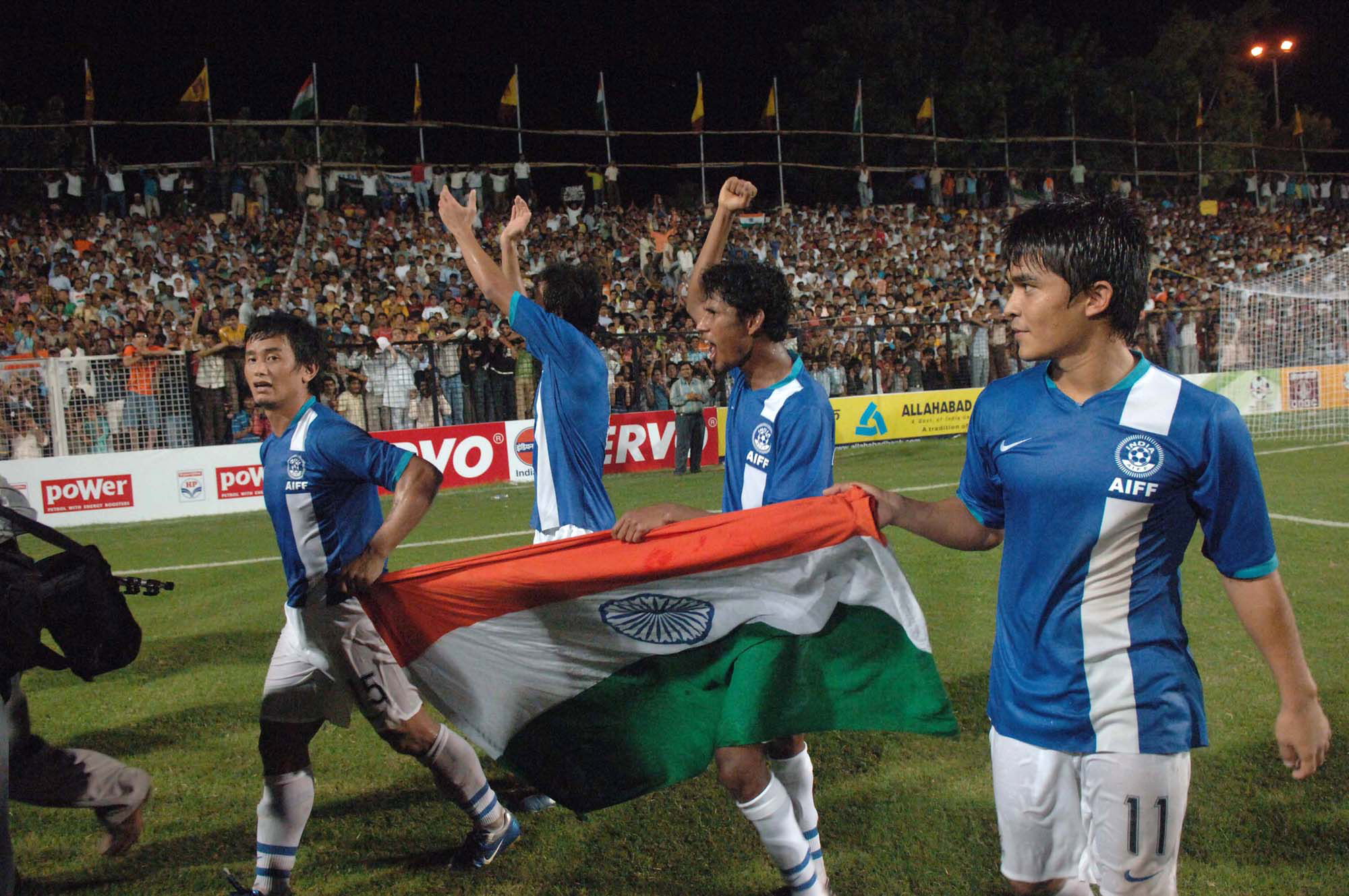
Chhetri (right) celebrating with teammates, after winning the 2007 Nehru Cup final against Syria

On 30 March 2004, Chhetri played his first game for the India U-20 football team in the 1–0 victory over Pakistan U-23 team in the 2004 South Asian Games in Pakistan. On 3 April 2004, Chhetri scored twice for the India U-20 team against Bhutan U-23 team in their 4–1 victory. On 12 June 2005 Sunil scored his first goal on his debut for the senior India national football team against Pakistan in the eventual 1–1 draw.

On 15 October 2019, Chhetri became the only Indian to secure a place in the list of top 10 goalscorers in international football.

=== 2007–2011 ===
Chhetri's first international tournament was the 2007 Nehru Cup. In the opening game, India defeated Cambodia 6–0 with Chhetri scoring two goals. He also scored a goal in the 2–3 defeat to Syria and another in the 3–0 win over Kyrgyzstan to take his goal tally to four. Chhetri was involved in the build-up to Pappachen Pradeep's decisive goal as India beat Syria 1–0 in the final to become the first champions of the tournament since 1997. Later in 2007, India began their 2010 FIFA World Cup qualification campaign. They were knocked out in the first round by Lebanon with Chhetri scoring once in the away leg (a 4–1 defeat) and once in the home leg (a 2–2 draw) resulting in a 6–3 aggregate defeat.

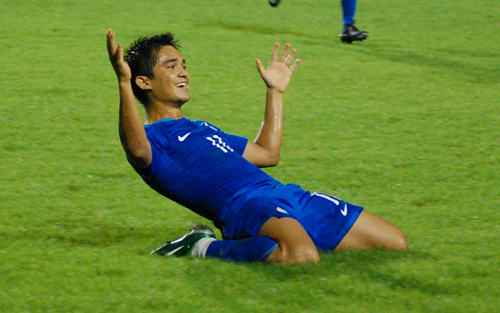
Chhetri celebrating after scoring in the 2008 AFC Challenge Cup

The 2008 SAFF Championship started with three victories out of a possible three in the group stages. In the opening game, Chhetri scored a goal in a 4–0 victory over Nepal. He scored once more in the championship—in the 2–1 semi-final victory over Bhutan; this was an equaliser before Gouramangi Singh scored India's second goal to send India through to the final. India lost 1–0 to the Maldives in the final and Chhetri played for the full 90 minutes. Later that year, in the 2008 AFC Challenge Cup, Chhetri played in all of the matches and scored four goals. In the 1–0 win over Afghanistan, he was involved in the build-up to Climax Lawrence's goal. He also played for the full 90 minutes against Tajikistan (a 1–1 draw) and Turkmenistan (a 2–1 win). In the semi-final against Myanmar, Chhetri scored the only goal in a 1–0 victory after being assisted by Bhaichung Bhutia to see India through to the final. In the final against Tajikistan, Chhetri scored a hat-trick which enabled India to win the Cup. This automatically qualified India for the 2011 Asian Cup, the first time they had qualified for the tournament in 24 years. His first goal was originally disallowed for offside by Uzbek referee Valentin Kovalenko, who changed his mind after consulting his assistant. Hundreds of fans waited outside the stadium to greet India's new "poster boy" and India manager Bob Houghton stated, "He is remarkable, brave and honest. He never gives up."

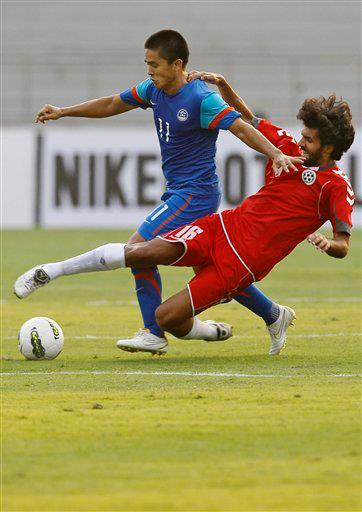
Chhetri at the 2011 SAFF Championship.

Initially, Goal.com stated that Chhetri would miss the 2009 Nehru Cup through injury. He played in the tournament, however, and he scored in the second match of the Nehru Cup, a penalty in a 2–1 win over Kyrgyzstan, this being first time he had completed a full match since getting injured before the pre-season tour of Spain with his club. He featured in the other three games in the round robin stage of the tournament, including the "dress rehearsal" for the final against Syria, but did not score. Chhetri was one of India's scorers in the penalty shootout victory over Syria in the final after the match had ended in a 1–1 draw. He showed flashes of brilliance and scored the second goal in a 5–2 defeat at the hands of Bahrain in the 2011 Asian Cup. He also scored a goal against South Korea at the 2011 AFC Asian Cup.

He was named the national team captain for the 2012 AFC Challenge Cup qualification which took place in Malaysia. On 16 November 2011 Chhetri scored in the 39th and 53rd minute for India against Malaysia in a friendly match played at the Salt Lake Stadium. The match ended 3–2 in favour of India. On 11 December 2011 after scoring a goal in SAFF Cup's final he set a new record by scoring seven goals in a single edition of the SAFF Championship surpassing I. M. Vijayan's record of six goals in the 97 edition.

=== 2012–2016 ===
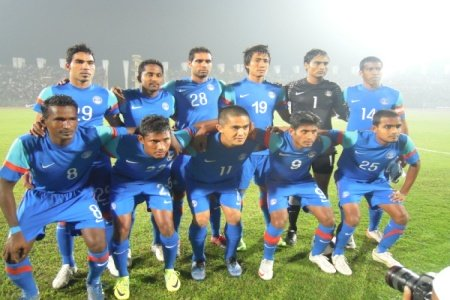
Chhetri (no 11) lining up with teammates of the national team in 2012

On 22 August 2012, Chhetri scored a goal with a header in the added time of the first half against Syria in the first match of 2012 Nehru Cup where India won the match 2–1. In the second match, which was on 25 August he scored two goals against Maldives, one goal coming from penalty where the team won 3–0. In the final against fancied opponents Cameroon, Chhetri scored from a well-taken penalty kick to equalize the score at 2–2. In the ensuing penalty shootout which India won 5–4, Chhetri went as the second kick-taker from India and scored.

=== 2017–2021 ===
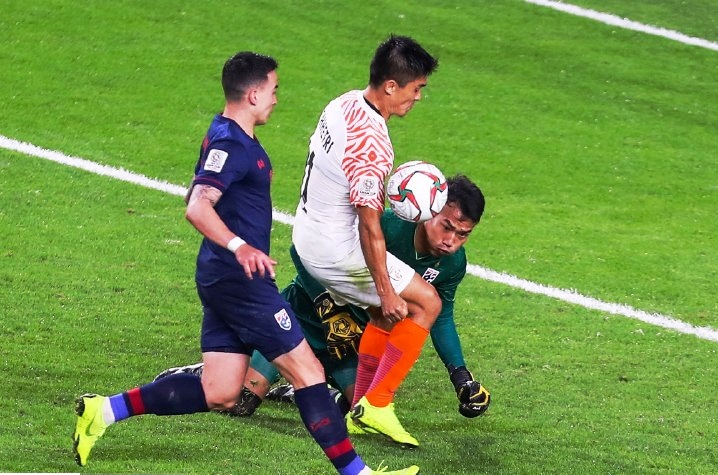
Chhetri (centre) in a 2019 AFC Asian Cup group match against Thailand

On 11 October 2017, Chhetri scored and assisted in a 4–1 home win against Macau in the 2019 AFC Asian Cup qualifiers, with this win they qualified for the 2019 AFC Asian Cup after missing out in 2015. Chhetri captained India to a 13 match unbeaten run before losing the final match to Kyrgyzstan. Nonetheless, India qualified for the 2019 AFC Asian Cup. He was among four renowned Asian players including Ali Daei, Sun Jihai and Phil Younghusband to be chosen for the seeds for the upcoming Asian cup.

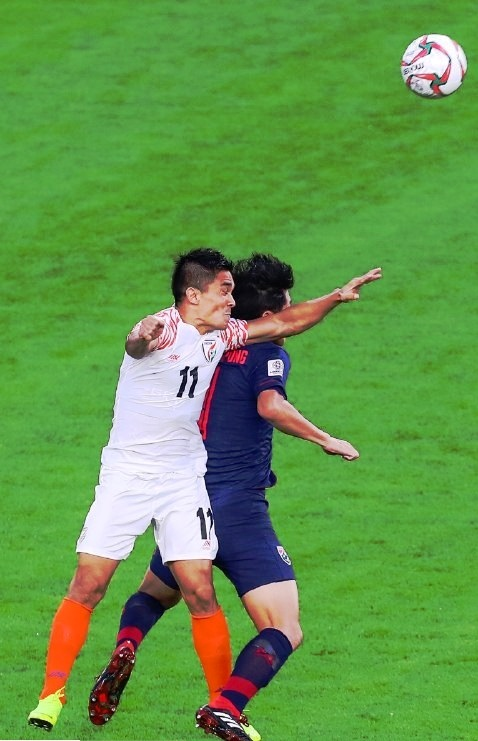
Chhetri (left) at the 2019 AFC Asian Cup

In June 2018, Chhetri scored a hat-trick in a 5–0 win over Chinese Taipei in their first match of 2018 Intercontinental Cup. However, after this match, Chhetri was disappointed with the poor turnout at the stadium and he uploaded a video on Twitter requesting people to come to Mumbai Football Arena to support the Indian team. His video went viral and garnered widespread support from fans, celebrities and legendary cricketers like Sachin Tendulkar and Virat Kohli. The stadium was packed with exuberant crowd for the rest of the matches. In the second match of the tournament, which was also Chhetri's 100th international appearance for India and also scored two goals including a goal from penalty spot in a 3–0 victory over Kenya. Chhetri scored a goal in the next match against New Zealand, but the match ended 2–1 loss for India though India qualified for the final. On 10 June, Chhetri scored twice again in a 2–0 win over Kenya in the final to win the Intercontinental Cup title and also equalled Argentina's Lionel Messi's tally of 64 international goals, making him the joint-second active international goalscorer at that time in front of Portugal's Cristiano Ronaldo. He finished as the top scorer of the tournament with eight goals. Chhetri's brace against Thailand on 6 January 2019 helped India to get a historic 4–1 win over them in the 2019 AFC Asian Cup. On 7 June 2021, Chhetri scored twice in a 2–0 win over Bangladesh in the 2022 FIFA World Cup qualification. On 13 October 2021, he scored twice again in a 3–1 win over Maldives in the 2021 SAFF Championship, making him the joint-sixth all time international goalscorer at that time, and the third highest active international goalscorer in football, behind only to Lionel Messi and Cristiano Ronaldo. On 16 October 2021, he scored again in a 3–0 win over Nepal in the final of the 2021 SAFF Championship, equalling Messi's 80 international goals.

=== 2022–2024 ===
Due to some injuries after 2021–22 Indian Super League season, Sunil was not able to participate for International friendlies against Bahrain and Belarus which were held in March 2022. Then he made his appearance against Jordan in an international friendly fixture which was played as a part of preparing for 2023 AFC Asian Cup Qualifiers which was going to be held in June 2022. On 8 June 2022, Chhetri played against Cambodia in 2023 AFC Asian Cup Qualifiers where he scored a brace, from a penalty spot and a header from a cross from Brandon Fernandes, by which India won 2–0 in Salt Lake Stadium. In the next match against Afghanistan, he scored from a freekick taking his international goals tally to 83. India won 2–1 in the match. Chhetri scored his 84th goal against Hong Kong in a 4–0 win in the next match. India qualified for the 2023 AFC Asian Cup with Chettri becoming the top scorer in the third round of the qualifiers with 4 goals.

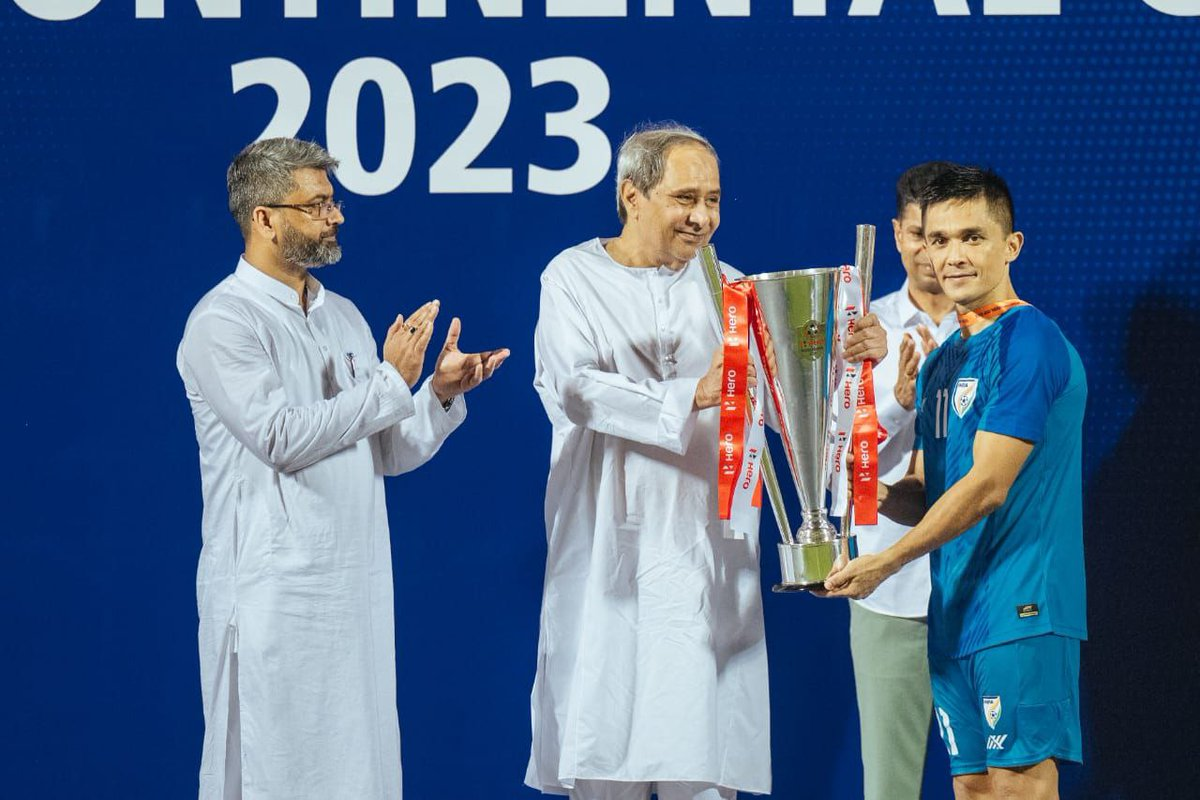
Odisha CM Naveen Patnaik handing the 2023 Intercontinental Cup trophy to Sunil Chhetri.

On 28 March, Chhetri scored his 85th goal against Kyrgyzstan in the tri-nation friendly and overtook Ferenc Puskás to become the fifth-highest international goalscorer. On 18 June, Chhetri scored the opening goal of a 2–0 win over Lebanon in the final of the 2023 Hero Intercontinental Cup, thus contributing decisively to help India win the tournament. Chhetri was the joint-top scorer of the tournament with two goals alongside teammate Lallianzuala Chhangte. On 21 June, Chhetri scored his 4th hat-trick for India in a 4–0 win over Pakistan in a group stage match of the 2023 SAFF Championship. His third goal of the night was his 90th international goal, thus overtaking Mokhtar Dahari's tally of 89 goals to become the second-highest Asian goalscorer in international football only behind Ali Daei of Iran, and the third among active players after Lionel Messi and Cristiano Ronaldo.

=== Retirement and comeback ===
On 16 May 2024, Chhetri posted a video on his social media handle of X, that the match against Kuwait for the 2026 FIFA World Cup qualification on 6 June at the Salt Lake Stadium in Kolkata, would be his last international match of his career. However, on 6 March 2025, AIFF officially mentioned Chhetri in the 26 member squad for March 2025 FIFA Window. It was revealed that, the then newly appointed head coach, Manolo Márquez requested Chhetri about making a comeback to strengthen the National Team for the third round of the 2027 AFC Asian Cup qualification, which he had agreed upon.

In his first match following his return, Chhetri scored against Maldives, heading in a Liston Colaco cross in the 75th minute. This was the third and final goal of the match, which eventually ended 3–0 to the Blue Tigers.

Following an unsuccessful 2027 AFC Asian Cup qualification campaign, Chhetri confirmed he had ended his national team career. His last match for the national team proved to be a 2–1 loss to Singapore.

== Style of play ==
Chhetri plays mainly as a central striker. Over a long career, he has changed his tactical duties and physical conditioning. Standing at 1.70 m (5 ft 7 in), he relies on exceptional timing and a strong vertical leap to score headers against taller central defenders. This includes important goals like match-winning diving headers. Writers and analysts also note his high work rate on the field. He helped bring a more professional approach to Indian football by carefully managing his diet and fitness.

== Career statistics ==
=== Club ===
As of match played 27 February 2026

Appearances and goals by club, season and competition
| Club | Season | League | | | Cup (Note: Includes Federation Cup, Durand Cup, U.S. Open Cup, Indian Super Cup) | | Continental (Note: Includes AFC Cup, AFC Champions League) | | Other | | Total | |
| Club | Season | Division | Apps | Goals | Apps | Goals | Apps | Goals | Apps | Goals | Apps | Goals |
|---|---|---|---|---|---|---|---|---|---|---|---|---|
| City Club Delhi | 2001–02 | Delhi Premier League | — | | — | | — | | — | | — | |
| Mohun Bagan | 2002–03 | National Football League | – | 4 | — | | — (Note: Mohun Bagan participated in the 2002–03 AFC Champions League qualification, but Chhetri's stats are unknown.) | | 10 (Note: Nine appearances and three goals Calcutta Football League, one appearance and one goal in All Airlines Gold Cup) | 4 | – | 8 |
| Mohun Bagan | 2003–04 | National Football League | – | 2 | 3 | 0 | — | | 18 (Note: Ten appearances and three goals in Calcutta Football League, four appearances and one goal in All Airlines Gold Cup, four appearances in IFA Shield) | 4 | – | 6 |
| Mohun Bagan | 2004–05 | National Football League | – | 4 | 8 | 3 | — | | 15 (Note: Twelve appearances and six goals in Calcutta Football League, three appearances and one goal in IFA Shield) | 7 | – | 14 |
| Mohun Bagan | Total | | 18 | 10 | 11 | 3 | — | | 43 | 15 | 72 | 28 |
| JCT | 2005–06 | National Football League | – | 3 | — | | — | | — | | – | 3 |
| JCT | 2006–07 | National Football League | – | 11 | — | | — | | — | | – | 11 |
| JCT | 2007–08 | I-League | – | 7 | — | | — | | — | | – | 7 |
| JCT | Total | | 48 | 21 | — | | — | | — | | 48 | 21 |
| East Bengal | 2008–09 | I-League | 17 | 9 | 4 | 2 | — | | 5 (Note: Appearance(s) in Calcutta Football League) | 2 | 26 | 13 |
| Dempo | 2009–10 | I-League | 13 | 8 | 6 | 1 | — | | 5 (Note: Appearance(s) in Goa Professional League) | 4 | 24 | 13 |
| Kansas City Wizards | 2010 | MLS | 0 | 0 | 1 | 0 | — | | 0 | 0 | 1 | 0 |
| Chirag United | 2010–11 | I-League | 7 | 7 | 0 | 0 | — | | 0 | 0 | 7 | 7 |
| Mohun Bagan | 2011–12 | I-League | 14 | 5 | 2 | 1 | — | | 2 | 1 | 18 | 7 |
| Sporting CP B | 2012–13 | Liga Portugal 2 | 3 | 0 | — | | — | | 0 | 0 | 3 | 0 |
| Churchill Brothers (loan) | 2012–13 | I-League | 8 | 4 | 0 | 0 | 5 | 2 | 4 | 2 | 17 | 8 |
| Bengaluru | 2013–14 | I-League | 23 | 14 | 3 | 1 | — | | — | | 26 | 15 |
| Bengaluru | 2014–15 | I-League | 20 | 2 | 9 | 9 | 6 | 3 | — | | 35 | 14 |
| Bengaluru | Total | | 43 | 16 | 12 | 10 | 6 | 3 | 0 | 0 | 61 | 29 |
| Mumbai City | 2015 | Indian Super League | 11 | 7 | — | | — | | — | | 11 | 7 |
| Mumbai City | 2016 | Indian Super League | 4 | 0 | — | | — | | 2 (Note: Appearances in ISL playoffs) | 0 | 6 | 0 |
| Mumbai City | Total | | 15 | 7 | 0 | 0 | 0 | 0 | 2 | 0 | 17 | 7 |
| Bengaluru (loan) | 2015–16 | I-League | 14 | 5 | 2 | 1 | 4 | 3 | — | | 20 | 9 |
| Bengaluru | 2016–17 | I-League | 16 | 7 | 3 | 0 | 11 | 5 | — | | 30 | 12 |
| Bengaluru | 2017–18 | Indian Super League | 18 | 10 | 4 | 6 | 8 | 4 | 3 | 4 | 33 | 24 |
| Bengaluru | 2018–19 | Indian Super League | 16 | 8 | 1 | 1 | 2 | 0 | 3 | 1 | 22 | 10 |
| Bengaluru | 2019–20 | Indian Super League | 15 | 9 | — | | 2 | 2 | 2 | 0 | 19 | 11 |
| Bengaluru | 2020–21 | Indian Super League | 20 | 8 | — | | 1 | 1 | — | | 21 | 9 |
| Bengaluru | 2021–22 | Indian Super League | 20 | 4 | 0 | 0 | 3 | 0 | — | | 23 | 4 |
| Bengaluru | 2022–23 | Indian Super League | 17 | 2 | 12 | 5 | — | | 4 | 3 | 33 | 10 |
| Bengaluru | 2023–24 | Indian Super League | 20 | 5 | 0 | 0 | — | | — | | 20 | 5 |
| Bengaluru | 2024–25 | Indian Super League | 24 | 12 | 5 | 3 | — | | 4 | 2 | 33 | 17 |
| Bengaluru | 2025–26 | Indian Super League | 13 | 2 | 3 | 2 | — | | — | | 16 | 4 |
| Bengaluru | Total | | 179 | 67 | 28 | 17 | 27 | 12 | 16 | 10 | 250 | 106 |
| Career total | | | 379 | 159 | 66 | 35 | 42 | 20 | 77 | 34 | 564 | 248 |

=== International ===
| National team | Year | Competitive | | Friendly | | Total | |
| National team | Year | Apps | Goals | Apps | Goals | Apps | Goals |
|---|---|---|---|---|---|---|---|
| India | 2005 | 0 | 0 | 5 | 1 | 5 | 1 |
| India | 2006 | 1 (Note: Appearance in 2007 AFC Asian Cup qualification) | 0 | 0 | 0 | 1 | 0 |
| India | 2007 | 2 (Note: Appearances in 2010 FIFA World Cup qualification) | 2 | 5 | 4 | 7 | 6 |
| India | 2008 | 10 (Note: Five appearances and two goals in 2008 SAFF Championship, five appearances and four goals in 2008 AFC Challenge Cup) | 6 | 3 | 2 | 13 | 8 |
| India | 2009 | 0 | 0 | 6 | 1 | 6 | 1 |
| India | 2010 | 0 | 0 | 6 | 3 | 6 | 3 |
| India | 2011 | 12 (Note: Three appearances and two goals in 2011 AFC Asian Cup, two appearances and one goal in 2012 AFC Challenge Cup qualification, two appearances in 2014 FIFA World Cup qualification, five appearances and seven goals in 2011 SAFF Championship) | 10 | 5 | 3 | 17 | 13 |
| India | 2012 | 3 (Note: Appearances in 2012 AFC Challenge Cup) | 0 | 5 | 4 | 8 | 4 |
| India | 2013 | 7 (Note: Three appearances and two goals in 2014 AFC Challenge Cup qualification, four appearances and one goal in 2013 SAFF Championship) | 3 | 4 | 2 | 11 | 5 |
| India | 2014 | 0 | 0 | 2 | 3 | 2 | 3 |
| India | 2015 | 11 (Note: Eight appearances and four goals in 2018 FIFA World Cup qualification, three appearances and two goals in 2015 SAFF Championship) | 6 | 1 | 0 | 12 | 6 |
| India | 2016 | 3 (Note: One appearance and one goal in 2015 SAFF Championship, two appearances in 2019 AFC Asian Cup qualification) | 1 | 1 | 1 | 4 | 2 |
| India | 2017 | 5 (Note: Appearances in 2019 AFC Asian Cup qualification) | 4 | 1 | 1 | 6 | 5 |
| India | 2018 | 0 | 0 | 6 | 8 | 6 | 8 |
| India | 2019 | 7 (Note: Three appearances and two goals in 2019 AFC Asian Cup, four appearances and one goal in 2022 FIFA World Cup qualification) | 3 | 4 | 4 | 11 | 7 |
| India | 2020 | 0 | 0 | 0 | 0 | 0 | 0 |
| India | 2021 | 8 (Note: Three appearances and two goals in 2022 FIFA World Cup qualification, five appearances and five goals in 2021 SAFF Championship) | 7 | 2 | 1 | 10 | 8 |
| India | 2022 | 3 (Note: Appearances in 2023 AFC Asian Cup qualification) | 4 | 3 | 0 | 6 | 4 |
| India | 2023 | 7 (Note: Five appearances and five goals in 2023 SAFF Championship, two appearances in 2026 FIFA World Cup qualification) | 5 | 7 | 4 | 14 | 9 |
| India | 2024 | 6 (Note: Three appearances in 2023 AFC Asian Cup, three appearances and one goal in 2026 FIFA World Cup qualification) | 1 | 0 | 0 | 6 | 1 |
| India | 2025 | 4 (Note: Appearances in 2027 AFC Asian Cup qualification) | 0 | 2 | 1 | 6 | 1 |
| Total | | 89 | 52 | 68 | 43 | 157 | 95 |

== Honours ==
Dempo

- I-League: 2009–10

Churchill Brothers

- I-League: 2012–13

Bengaluru

- Indian Super League: 2018–19
- I-League: 2013–14, 2015–16
- Federation Cup: 2014–15, 2016–17
- Super Cup: 2018
- Durand Cup: 2022
- AFC Champions League Two runner-up: 2016
- Puttaiah Memorial Cup: 2014

India

- AFC Challenge Cup: 2008
- SAFF Championship: 2011, 2015, 2021, 2023; runner-up: 2008, 2013
- Nehru Cup: 2007, 2009, 2012
- Intercontinental Cup: 2018, 2023
- Tri-Nation Series: 2023

India U20

- South Asian Games silver medal: 2004

Individual

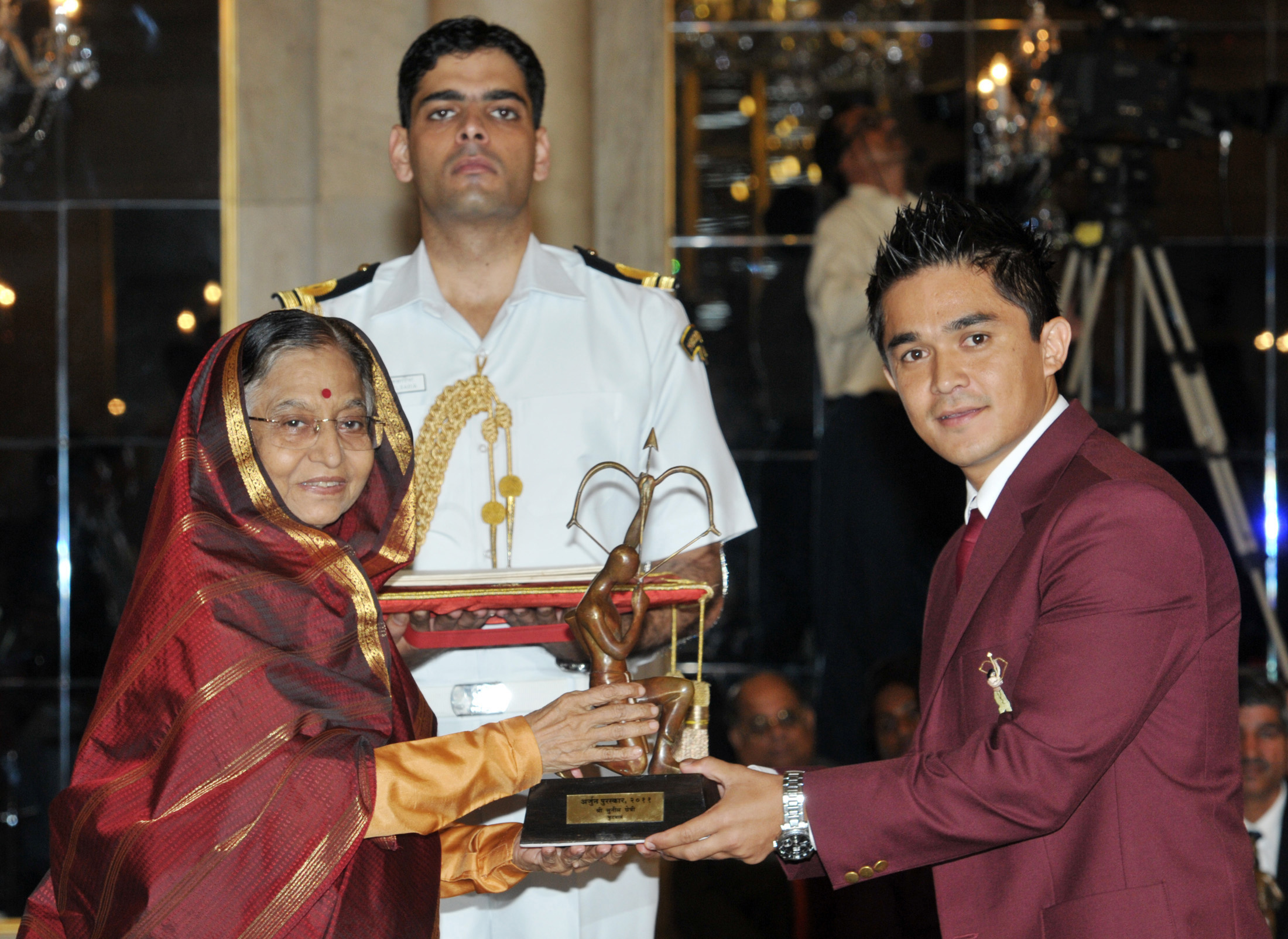
Pratibha Patil, then-president of India, presenting the Arjuna Award to Chhetri in 2011.

- AIFF Player of the Year: 2007, 2011, 2013, 2014, 2017, 2018–19, 2021–22
- FPAI Indian Player of the Year: 2009, 2018, 2019, 2020
- SAFF Championship Player of the Tournament: 2011, 2015, 2021, 2023
- SAFF Championship Top Scorer: 2011, 2021, 2023
- Hero of the Intercontinental Cup: 2018
- Hero of the I-League: 2016–17
- I-League Golden Boot: 2013–14
- Hero of the Indian Super League: 2017–18
- 2018 Indian Super Cup: Golden Boot
- Indian Sports Honours: Sportsman of the Year 2019 (team sports)
- Football Ratna Award (first recipient) by Football Delhi: 18 February 2019
- The Times of India TOISA Best Footballer: 2021

Other

- Leading up to the 2022 World Cup, FIFA honoured Chhetri on the occasion by releasing three documentary episodes about his life and career for becoming the third-highest male international goalscorer in the world among active players.
- AFC Asian Icon: 3 August 2018
- 2019 AFC Asian Cup: Favourite Player (voted by fans)
- AFC Cup All-time XI (The Strikers): Inductee (2021)

Awards and accolades

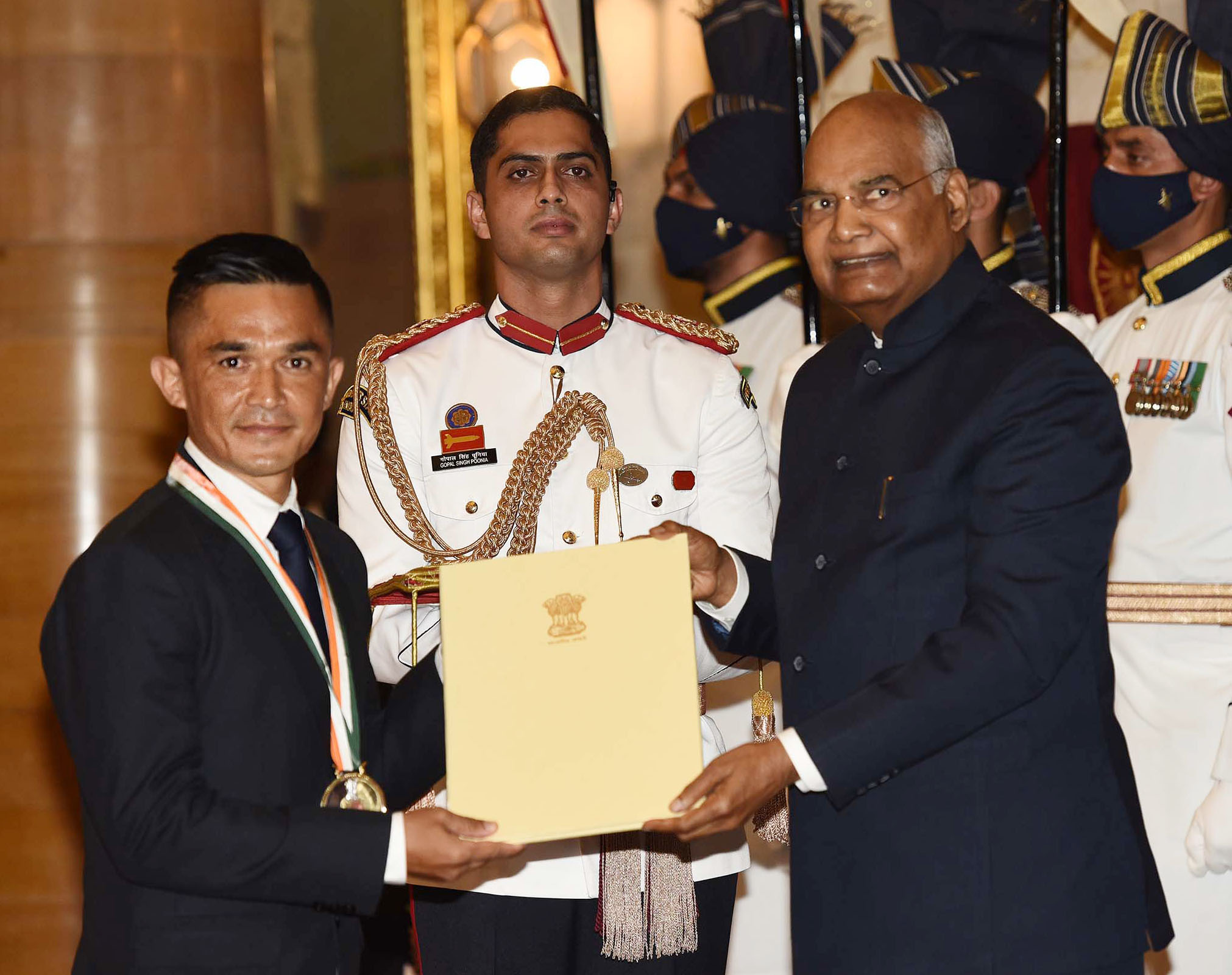
Ram Nath Kovind, then-president of India, presenting the Khel Ratna Award to Chhetri in 2021.

- 2011 − Arjuna Award, by the Government of India in recognition of his outstanding achievement in sports.
- 2019 − Padma Shri, the fourth-highest civilian honour of India.
- 2021 – Khel Ratna Award, the highest sporting honour of India.
- 2025 – Bhogeswar Baruah National Sports Award, the inaugural Lifetime Achievement in Sports award.

== See also ==
- List of top international men's football goalscorers by country
- List of men's footballers with 100 or more international caps
- List of men's footballers with 50 or more international goals
- List of India national football team hat-tricks
- List of India national football team captains
- List of Indian football first tier top scorers
- List of India international footballers
- List of Indian expatriate footballers
- FPAI Indian Player of the Year
- AIFF Player of the Year
