= Qusay Habib =

Syrian footballer (born 1987)

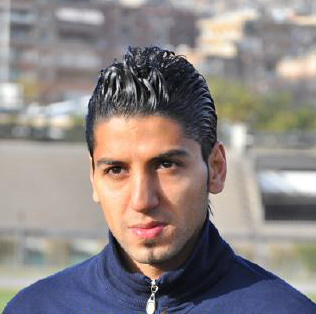

Personal information
- Full name: Qusay Adnan Habib
- Date of birth: 15 April 1987 (age 39)
- Place of birth: Qamishli, Syria
- Height: 1.80 m (5 ft 11 in)
- Position: Midfielder

Team information
- Current team: Baghdad
- Number: 10

Senior career*
Years	Team	Apps	(Gls)
2005–2008	Al-Jehad		
2008–2010	Al-Wahda		
2010–2013	Al-Shorta	1	(0)
2013–2015	Baghdad	25	(1)
2021–	Al-Wahda	6	(1)

International career^{‡}
2007–2008	Syria U-23	10	(1)
2010–2015	Syria	17	(0)
- * Club domestic league appearances and goals ‡ National team caps and goals as of 24 September 2022

Qusay Habib (Arabic: قصي حبيب, born 15 April 1987 in Qamishli, Syria) is a Syrian footballer. He currently plays for Al-Wahda SC, which competes in the Syrian Premier League the top division in Syria. He plays as a midfielder, wearing the number 30 jersey for Al-Wahda SC and for the Syrian national football team he wears the number 9 shirt.

== Club career ==
Habib started his professional career with Al-Jehad. In January 2008, he transferred to Al-Wahda. Following the 2009–10 season, Habib signed for recently promoted Syrian Premier League club Al-Shorta. He joined Baghdad in October 2013.

== International career ==
Habib has been a regular for the Syrian national football team since 2010 and he debuted in a 14 November 2010 International Friendly against Bahrain.

Syria's coach Valeriu Tiţa included Habib in his squad for the 2011 AFC Asian Cup finals in Qatar, but did not start him in any of the three group games. Habib came on as a second-half substitute in the victory over Saudi Arabia and he plays at the second-halftime in the 1–2 defeat against Jordan.
