= Bakytbek Mamatov =

Kyrgyzstani footballer

Personal information
- Date of birth: 17 March 1980 (age 46)
- Place of birth: Soviet Union
- Position: Midfielder

Team information
- Current team: Alay Osh

Senior career*
Years	Team	Apps	(Gls)
2005–2006	Zhashtyk Ak Altyn Kara-Suu		
2006–2014	Abdish-Ata Kant		
2014–	Alay Osh		

International career
2007–	Kyrgyzstan		
- * Club domestic league appearances and goals

Bakytbek Mamatov is a Kyrgyzstani footballer who plays for Alay Osh after leaving FC Abdysh-Ata Kant in 2014. He is a member of the Kyrgyzstan national football team.

== International Career Stats ==
=== Goals for Senior National Team ===
#	Date	Venue	Opponent	Score	Result	Competition
	19 August 2007	New Delhi, India	Cambodia	4–3	Won	Nehru Cup 2007
