= Zyad Chaabo =

Syrian footballer (born 1979)

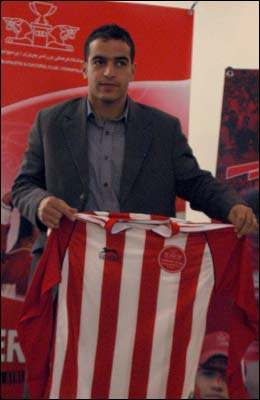

Personal information
- Full name: Zyad Barakat Chaabo
- Date of birth: 1 January 1979 (age 47)
- Place of birth: Latakia, Syria
- Height: 1.79 m (5 ft 10 in)
- Position: Striker

Youth career
- Hutteen

Senior career*
Years	Team	Apps	(Gls)
1994–2001	Hutteen		
2001–2007	Al-Jaish		
2007	→ Persepolis (loan)	9	(2)
2007–2008	→ Al-Karamah (loan)		
2008–2009	Al-Taliya		
2009–2010	Al-Wahda	12	(5)
2010–2011	Hutteen		
2013	Misfat Baniyas		

International career
2001–2010	Syria	49	(22)
- * Club domestic league appearances and goals

Zyad Barakat Chaabo (Arabic: زياد شعبو; born 1 January 1979) is a Syrian former footballer who played as a striker.

== Career statistics ==
=== International ===
Scores and results list Syria's goal tally first.

No	Date	Venue	Opponent	Score	Result	Competition
1.	30 January 2006	Bahrain National Stadium, Riffa, Bahrain	Bahrain	1–0	1–1	Friendly
2.	1 March 2006	Zhongshan Soccer Stadium, Taipei, Taiwan	Chinese Taipei	1–0	4–0	2007 AFC Asian Cup qualification
3.	1 March 2006	Zhongshan Soccer Stadium, Taipei, Taiwan	Chinese Taipei	3–0	4–0	2007 AFC Asian Cup qualification
4.	2 May 2006	Maktoum Bin Rashid Al Maktoum Stadium, Dubai, United Arab Emirates	United Arab Emirates	1–0	1–2	Friendly
5.	15 July 2006	Abbasiyyin Stadium, Damascus, Syria	Iraq	1–2	1–3	Friendly
6.	16 August 2006	Azadi Stadium, Tehran, Iran	Iran	1–1	1–1	2007 AFC Asian Cup qualification
7.	16 June 2007	Amman International Stadium, Amman, Jordan	Lebanon	1–0	1–0	2007 West Asian Football Federation Championship
8.	18 August 2007	Ambedkar Stadium, New Delhi, India	Bangladesh	2–0	2–0	2007 Nehru Cup
9.	21 August 2007	Ambedkar Stadium, New Delhi, India	Kyrgyzstan	2–1	4–1	2007 Nehru Cup
10.	23 August 2007	Ambedkar Stadium, New Delhi, India	India	2–1	3–2	2007 Nehru Cup
11.	23 August 2007	Ambedkar Stadium, New Delhi, India	India	3–1	3–2	2007 Nehru Cup
12.	25 August 2007	Ambedkar Stadium, New Delhi, India	Cambodia	2–0	5–1	2007 Nehru Cup
13.	9 November 2007	Gelora Bung Karno Stadium, Jakarta, Indonesia	Indonesia	3–1	4–1	2010 FIFA World Cup qualification
14.	18 November 2007	Abbasiyyin Stadium, Damascus, Syria	Indonesia	1–0	7–0	2010 FIFA World Cup qualification
15.	18 November 2007	Abbasiyyin Stadium, Damascus, Syria	Indonesia	2–0	7–0	2010 FIFA World Cup qualification
16.	18 November 2007	Abbasiyyin Stadium, Damascus, Syria	Indonesia	6–0	7–0	2010 FIFA World Cup qualification
17.	23 January 2008	Bahrain National Stadium, Riffa, Bahrain	Bahrain	1–0	2–1	Friendly
18.	23 January 2008	Bahrain National Stadium, Riffa, Bahrain	Bahrain	2–1	2–1	Friendly
19.	26 March 2008	Abbasiyyin Stadium, Damascus, Syria	United Arab Emirates	1–0	1–1	2010 FIFA World Cup qualification
20.	10 May 2008	Abbasiyyin Stadium, Damascus, Syria	Oman	1–1	2–1	Friendly
21.	10 May 2008	Abbasiyyin Stadium, Damascus, Syria	Oman	2–1	2–1	Friendly

== Honours ==
Hutteen

- Syrian Cup: 2000–01

Al-Jaish

- Syrian Premier League: 2001–02, 2002–03
- Syrian Cup: 2001–02, 2003–04
- AFC Cup: 2004

Al-Karamah

- Syrian Premier League: 2007–08
- Syrian Cup: 2007–08

Syria

- Nehru Cup runner-up: 2007
- West Asian Games runner-up: 2005

Individual

- Best Syrian Footballer: 2003
- Syrian Premier League top scorer: 2002–03
- Nehru Cup top scorer: 2007
