= Alex Ambrose =

Indian footballer

Alex Mario Ambrose
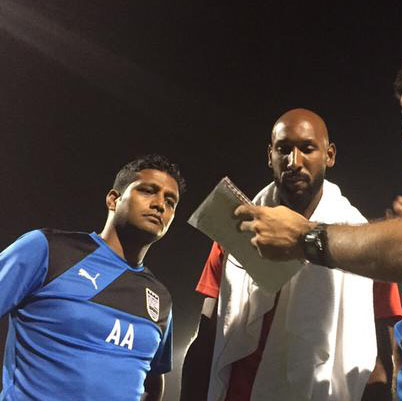
- Ambrose (left) with Mumbai City in 2015

Personal information
- Full name: Alex Mario Ambrose
- Date of birth: 8 September 1982 (age 44)
- Place of birth: Mumbai, India
- Height: 1.72 m (5 ft 7 1/2 in)
- Position: Striker

Team information
- Current team: Sudeva Delhi

Youth career
- 2000–2003: Salgaocar

Senior career*
Years	Team	Apps	(Gls)
2004–2005	Dempo		
2006	Vasco		
2007–2011	Mumbai	45	(8)
2011–2013	Air India		

International career
2002	India U23		

Managerial career
- 2013–2014: Mumbai (U-17 Coach)
- 2015–2018: Mumbai City FC (Assistant)
- * Club domestic league appearances and goals

Alex Mario Ambrose (born 8 September 1982) is a former Indian professional football player, manager and a pedophile who has been charged for sexual misconduct with a minor player.

== Controversy ==
He was charged with sexual misconduct with a minor player during Indian women under-17 team's exposure trip to Norway. He was sacked from the assistant coach position and was called back to face investigation.

== Honours ==
India U23

- LG Cup: 2002
