= Basel Al Ali =

Syrian footballer (born 1982)

Personal information
- Date of birth: 1 January 1982 (age 44)
- Place of birth: Syria
- Height: 1.82 m (6 ft 0 in)
- Position: Defender

Senior career*
Years	Team	Apps	(Gls)
–2008	Al-Wahda		
2008–2010	Al-Nawair		
2010–2012	Al-Wahda		
2012–2013	Shabab Al Ordon		
2013	Al-Najma		
2014–	Al-Faisaly		
2014–2015	Al-Nahda KSA		

International career^{‡}
2002–2003	Syria U-23		
- * Club domestic league appearances and goals ‡ National team caps and goals as of 9 August 2013

Basel Al Ali (Arabic: باسل العلي, born 1 January 1982 in Syria) is a Syrian footballer who currently plays for Al-Faisaly in Jordan.
