= Abdulhadi Al Hariri =

Syrian footballer (born 1982)

Abdul-Hadi Al-Hariri عبد الهادي حريري
Personal information
- Date of birth: 7 April 1982 (age 44)
- Place of birth: Syria
- Position: Striker

Team information
- Current team: Al-Majd
- Number: 11

Senior career*
Years	Team	Apps	(Gls)
2001–	Al-Majd		
2008	→ Shabab Al Ordon (loan)		
- * Club domestic league appearances and goals

Abdul-Hadi Al-Hariri (Arabic: عبد الهادي حريري; born 7 April 1982 in Syria) is a Syrian footballer. He currently plays for Al-Majd in the Syrian Premier League.
