= Ibrahim Al Hasan =

Syrian footballer (born 1981)

Ibrahim Al Hasan ابراهيم الحسن
Personal information
- Date of birth: July 10, 1981 (age 45)
- Place of birth: Manbij, Syria
- Position: Midfielder

Team information
- Current team: Teshrin

Senior career*
Years	Team	Apps	(Gls)
2006–2008	Afrin		
2008–2009	Jableh		(3+)
2009–2010	Teshrin		(12)
2010	Al-Arabi Irbid		(3)
2010–2012	Al-Nawair		
Total			(20+)

International career
	Syria U21	?	(41)
2007–2008	Syria	5	(1)
- * Club domestic league appearances and goals

Ibrahim Al Hasan (Arabic: ابراهيم الحسن) (born July 10, 1981 in Syria) is a retired Syrian football player who played lastly currently for Al-Nawair in the Syrian Premier League.

During the Syrian Civil War he joined the Free Syrian Army.

== Career statistics ==
=== International goal(s) ===
#	Date	Venue	Opponent	Score	Result	Competition
	August 21, 2007	New Delhi, India	Kyrgyzstan	4–1	Won	Nehru Cup 2007

Having 41 International mostly being u21 goals being the current highest goal scorer in Syria's u21 history.
