= Seongnam FC–Suwon Samsung Bluewings rivalry =

Football rivalry in South Korea

Magyedaejeon 마계대전 馬鷄大戰
- Other names: Horse vs. Rooster
- Location: (South Korea) Seoul Metropolitan Area
- Teams: Seongnam FC; Suwon Samsung Bluewings
- First meeting: April 14, 1996
- Latest meeting: Seongnam 1–2 Suwon (September 22, 2024)

Statistics
- Total meetings: Total: 100 (1996–2024)
- Most wins: Total: Suwon (38, 1996–2024)
- All-time series: Total: 1996–2024 * Seongnam (31) * Suwon (38)

Seongnam FC–Suwon Samsung Bluewings rivalry, also called the Magyedaejeon (Korean: 마계대전) or Magye derby, is a South Korean footballing rivalry between K League teams Seongnam FC and Suwon Samsung Bluewings. The clubs are respectively located in Seongnam and Suwon, two of the largest cities in the Seoul Metropolitan Area. The K League has stated on its official website that this match is one of classic football rivalries in the league.

== History ==
The rivalry started in 1996 and became more intense when Cheonan Ilhwa Chunma moved to Seongnam and became Seongnam Ilhwa Chunma. As both clubs were enjoying success at the time, matches between those two were both fierce and tough. In addition, the fact that Seongnam and Suwon are less than 30 km away added intensity to the matches. The two are among the largest and economically most important cities in South Korea, with Seongnam being home to Pangyo Techno Valley and Korean internet giants like Naver, while Suwon is the headquarters of technology giant Samsung Electronics.

The rivalry became prominent in the mid-2000s after the name Magyedaejeon was dubbed to the game. The name "Magyedaejeon" derived from a graphic novel with the same title by a renowned Korean cartoonist Kim Sung-Mo. Some fans came up with the idea to use the name for the match between Seongnam and Suwon because Magyedaejeon, which can be translated into the "Battle between Horse and Rooster," can be viewed an interesting symbolization of the game. Seongnam's mascot Chunma (Korean: 천마), which is Korean Pegasus, represents "Ma" (Korean: 마), which is horse, while "Gye" (Korean: 계), rooster, perfectly matches Suwon's name, "Bluewings." The name became popular after Schadarappa, a popular Korean football cartoonist famous for being a fervent Seongnam fan, frequently used the term in his cartoons.

Because both clubs have remained successful in Korea, Magyedaejeon was played in several important occasions such as 2000 Korean Super Cup Final, 2000 Adidas Cup Final, 2006 K-League Championship Final, 2009 Korean FA Cup Final, 2010 AFC Champions League Quarter-final and 2011 Korean FA Cup Final.

As of 2025, both clubs play in K League 2, with Seongnam having been relegated in 2022 and Suwon having been relegated in 2023.

== Players who have played for both clubs ==
- (South Korea) Kim Yi-Joo (Seongnam: 1989–1995, Suwon: 1996–1997, Seongnam: 1997–1998)
- (South Korea) Park Nam-Yeol (Seongnam: 1993–2003, Suwon: 2004)
- (South Korea) Park Choong-Kyun (Suwon: 1996–2001, Seongnam: 2001–2003)
- (South Korea) Lee Ki-Hyung (Suwon: 1996–2002, Seongnam: 2003–2004)
- (Russia) (South Korea) Denis (Lee Seong-Nam) (Suwon: 1996–2002, Seongnam: 2003–2005, Suwon: 2006–2007)
- (Socialist Federal Republic of Yugoslavia) Saša (Suwon: 1998–2000, Seongnam: 2001–2003)
- (South Korea) Hwang In-Soo (Seongnam: 2000–2001, Suwon: 2001–2002)
- (South Korea) Kim Dae-Eui (Seongnam: 2000–2003, Suwon: 2004–2010)
- (South Korea) Seo Dong-Won (Suwon: 2001, Seongnam: 2006–2007)
- (South Korea) Kim Do-Heon (Suwon: 2001–2005, Seongnam: 2005–2007, Suwon: 2009–2010, 2012–present)
- (South Korea) Son Dae-Ho (Suwon: 2002–2004, Seongnam: 2005–2008)
- (South Korea) Cho Byung-Kuk (Suwon: 2002–2004, Seongnam: 2005–2010)
- (Croatia) (South Korea) Savik (Lee Sa-Vik) (Seongnam: 2003–2005, Suwon: 2005–2007)
- (South Korea) Namgung Woong (Suwon: 2003–2010, Seongnam: 2011–2012)
- (South Korea) Kim Dong-Hyun (Suwon: 2004–2005, Seongnam: 2007–2008)
- (South Korea) Ahn Hyo-Yeon (Suwon: 2005, Seongnam: 2006, Suwon: 2007–2008)
- (South Korea) Kim Sang-Duk (Suwon: 2005, Seongnam: 2006–2007)
- (Brazil) Itamar (Suwon: 2005–2006, Seongnam: 2007)
- (South Korea) Han Dong-Won (Seongnam: 2007–2009, Suwon: 2012)
- (South Korea) Choi Sung-Kuk (Seongnam: 2007–2010, Suwon: 2011)
- (South Korea) Jung Sung-Ryong (Seongnam: 2008–2010, Suwon: 2011–present)
- (South Korea) Cho Dong-Gun (Seongnam: 2008–2011, Suwon: 2012–present)
- (Montenegro) Radončić (Seongnam: 2009–2011, Suwon: 2012–present)
- (South Korea) Lee Sang-Ki (Seongnam: 2010, Suwon: 2011, 2013–present)
- (South Korea) Ha Kang-Jin (Suwon: 2010, Seongnam: 2011–2012)
- (South Korea) Hwang Jae-Won (Suwon: 2010–2011, Seongnam: 2012–present)
- (South Korea) Hong Chul (Seongnam: 2010–2012, Suwon: 2013–present)
- (South Korea) Chung Da-Woon (Seongnam: 2012, Suwon: 2013)

== Venues ==
| Seongnam Ilhwa Chunma | | Seongnam FC–Suwon Samsung Bluewings rivalry is located in South Korea | Suwon Samsung Bluewings | |
|---|---|---|---|---|
| Seongnam Stadium | Tancheon Sports Complex | Seongnam FC–Suwon Samsung Bluewings rivalry is located in South Korea | Suwon Sports Complex | Suwon World Cup Stadium |
| Capacity: 21,242 | Capacity: 16,250 | Seongnam FC–Suwon Samsung Bluewings rivalry is located in South Korea | Capacity: 24,670 | Capacity: 43,959 |

== Match reports ==
=== League matches ===
- Chunan Ilhwa Chunma vs Suwon Samsung Bluewings (1996-1999)

| Played | Chunan wins | Draws | Suwon wins | Chunan goals | Suwon goals |
|---|---|---|---|---|---|
| 11 | 0 | 4 | 7 | 14 | 23 |

2000 K-League
17 June 2000
19:00

| Seongnam Ilhwa Chunma | 2 – 2 | Suwon Samsung Bluewings |
|---|---|---|
| Lee Sang-yoon 5'; Kim Sang-Sik 80' | Report | Park Kun-Ha 4'; Saša Drakulić 57' |
Penalties
| Kim Sang-Sik (penalty scored); Kim Young-chul (penalty scored); Moon Sam-Jin (penalty scored); Kim Dae-Eui (penalty scored); Lee Sang-yoon (penalty scored) | 5 – 3 | (penalty scored) Shin Hong-Gi; (penalty missed) Park Kun-Ha; (penalty scored) Kim Jin-woo; (penalty scored) Zoli |

Seongnam Stadium
Attendance: 15,026
Referee: Seo Jung-Sam
2000 K-League
30 July 2000
19:00

| Seongnam Ilhwa Chunma | 0 – 2 | Suwon Samsung Bluewings |
|---|---|---|
| | Report | Shin Hong-Gi 70'; Seo Jung-Won 83' |

Mokdong Stadium
Attendance: 4,825
Referee: Son Jong-Deok
2000 K-League
5 August 2000
19:00

| Suwon Samsung Bluewings | 2 – 4 | Seongnam Ilhwa Chunma |
|---|---|---|
| Ko Jong-Soo 59'; Lucky 71' | Report | Kim Hyun-Soo 6'; Joi 44'; Shin Tae-Yong 79'; Park Nam-Yeol 90' |

Suwon Civic Stadium
Attendance: 15,722
Referee: Kwon Jong-Chul

2001 K-League
1 July 2001
19:00

| Seongnam Ilhwa Chunma | 1 – 1 | Suwon Samsung Bluewings |
|---|---|---|
| Ivan 86' | Report | Sandro 4' |

Seongnam Stadium
Attendance: 15,732
Referee: Han Byung-Hwa
2001 K-League
22 August 2001
19:00

| Suwon Samsung Bluewings | 1 – 2 | Seongnam Ilhwa Chunma |
|---|---|---|
| Sandro 82' | Report | Kim Yong-hee 11'; Irineu 70' |

Suwon World Cup Stadium
Attendance: 18,864
Referee: Kim Hoi-Sung
2001 K-League
13 October 2001
15:00

| Seongnam Ilhwa Chunma | 2 – 0 | Suwon Samsung Bluewings |
|---|---|---|
| Cho Jin-Ho 51'; Hwang Yeon-Seok 90+2' | Report |

Seongnam Stadium
Attendance: 14,737
Referee: Lee Sang-Yong

2002 K-League
28 July 2002
19:00

| Suwon Samsung Bluewings | 2 – 2 | Seongnam Ilhwa Chunma |
|---|---|---|
| Kim Hyun-Soo 61' (o.g.); Sandro 79' | Report | Saša Drakulić 45' (pen.), 87' |

Suwon World Cup Stadium
Attendance: 35,870
Referee: Lim Jong-Ho
2002 K-League
11 September 2002
19:30

| Suwon Samsung Bluewings | 0 – 1 | Seongnam Ilhwa Chunma |
|---|---|---|
| | Report | Kim Dae-Eui 90' |

Suwon World Cup Stadium
Attendance: 15,303
Referee: Lee Sang-Yong
2002 K-League
23 October 2002
19:30

| Seongnam Ilhwa Chunma | 0 – 0 | Suwon Samsung Bluewings |
|---|---|---|
| | Report |

Seongnam Stadium
Attendance: 4,632
Referee: Lutz Michael Fröhlich (Germany)

2003 K-League
30 March 2003
15:00

| Suwon Samsung Bluewings | 1 – 2 | Seongnam Ilhwa Chunma |
|---|---|---|
| Tuta 3' | Report | Park Nam-Yeol 23'; Irineu 81' |

Suwon World Cup Stadium
Attendance: 12,582
Referee: Lee Sang-Yong
2003 K-League
12 July 2003
19:00

| Seongnam Ilhwa Chunma | 2 – 1 | Suwon Samsung Bluewings |
|---|---|---|
| Saša Drakulić 10'; Kim Do-Hoon 55' | Report | Tuta 20' |

Seongnam Stadium
Attendance: 8,972
Referee: Peter Gagelmann (Germany)
2003 K-League
30 July 2003
19:30

| Suwon Samsung Bluewings | 2 – 1 | Seongnam Ilhwa Chunma |
|---|---|---|
| Jung Yoon-Sung 15'; Gabi 43' | Report | Shin Tae-Yong 57' |

Suwon World Cup Stadium
Attendance: 15,396
Referee: Kwon Jong-Chul
2003 K-League
12 November 2003
19:30

| Seongnam Ilhwa Chunma | 2 – 4 | Suwon Samsung Bluewings |
|---|---|---|
| Kim Do-Hoon 70'; Lee Seong-Nam 86' | Report | Tuta 32'; Nádson 57', 87'; Seo Jung-Won 83' |

Seongnam Stadium
Attendance: 1,375
Referee: Kim Jin-Ok

2004 K-League
24 April 2004
15:00

| Seongnam Ilhwa Chunma | 2 – 2 | Suwon Samsung Bluewings |
|---|---|---|
| Cho Byung-Kuk 34' (o.g.); Shin Tae-Yong 44' (pen.) | Report | Marcel 15'; Kim Dae-Eui 54' (pen.) |

Seongnam Stadium
Attendance: 7,953
Referee: Kwon Jong-Chul
2004 K-League
3 November 2004
19:00

| Suwon Samsung Bluewings | 1 – 2 | Seongnam Ilhwa Chunma |
|---|---|---|
| Marcel 36' | Report | Lee Ki-Hyung 46'; Lee Seong-Nam 64' |

Suwon World Cup Stadium
Attendance: 18,365
Referee: Markus Schmidt (Germany)

2005 K-League
22 June 2005
19:00

| Suwon Samsung Bluewings | 2 – 2 | Seongnam Ilhwa Chunma |
|---|---|---|
| Kim Dae-Eui 45', 61' | Report | Kim Do-Hoon 52'; Nam Ki-Il 59' |

Suwon World Cup Stadium
Attendance: 10,327
Referee: Kim Sung-Ho
2005 K-League
5 October 2005
19:00

| Seongnam Ilhwa Chunma | 1 – 0 | Suwon Samsung Bluewings |
|---|---|---|
| Mota 50' | Report |

Tancheon Sports Complex
Attendance: 10,007
Referee: Lee Sang-Yong

2006 K-League
16 April 2006
15:00

| Seongnam Ilhwa Chunma | 0 – 1 | Suwon Samsung Bluewings |
|---|---|---|
| | Report | Kim Dae-Eui 50' |

Tancheon Sports Complex
Attendance: 8,842
Referee: Choi Kwang-Bo
2006 K-League
14 October 2006
17:00

| Suwon Samsung Bluewings | 3 – 0 | Seongnam Ilhwa Chunma |
|---|---|---|
| Kim Dae-Eui 34'; Mato 84' (pen.); Silva 90+1' | Report |

Suwon World Cup Stadium
Attendance: 27,482
Referee: Choi Kwang-Bo
2006 K-League Championship 1st leg
19 November 2006
14:00

| Seongnam Ilhwa Chunma | 1 – 0 | Suwon Samsung Bluewings |
|---|---|---|
| Woo Sung-Yong 88' | Report |

Tancheon Sports Complex
Attendance: 21,437
Referee: Lutz Wagner (Germany)
2006 K-League Championship 2nd leg
25 November 2006
14:00

| Suwon Samsung Bluewings | 1 – 2 | Seongnam Ilhwa Chunma |
|---|---|---|
| Silva 75' | Report | Mota 25', 65' |

Suwon World Cup Stadium
Attendance: 38,526
Referee: Shamsul Maidin (Singapore)

2007 K-League
1 April 2007
15:00

| Seongnam Ilhwa Chunma | 3 – 1 | Suwon Samsung Bluewings |
|---|---|---|
| Kim Dong-hyun 2', 62'; Kim Sang-Sik 49' | Report | Nádson 7' |

Tancheon Sports Complex
Attendance: 10,507
Referee: Choi Myung-Yong
2007 K-League
15 August 2007
19:00

| Suwon Samsung Bluewings | 2 – 1 | Seongnam Ilhwa Chunma |
|---|---|---|
| Kim Dae-Eui 20'; Lee Kwan-Woo 50' (pen.) | Report | Mota 75' (pen.) |

Suwon World Cup Stadium
Attendance: 31,726
Referee: Lee Sang-Yong

2008 K-League
16 March 2008
15:00

| Seongnam Ilhwa Chunma | 2 – 2 | Suwon Samsung Bluewings |
|---|---|---|
| Han Dong-Won 24'; Dudu 35' | Report | Lee Kwan-Woo 31', 51' |

Tancheon Sports Complex
Attendance: 14,667
Referee: Yoo Seon-Ho
2008 K-League
20 July 2008
19:30

| Suwon Samsung Bluewings | 0 – 1 | Seongnam Ilhwa Chunma |
|---|---|---|
| | Report | Dudu 49' |

Suwon World Cup Stadium
Attendance: 19,253
Referee: Ko Kum-Bok

2009 K-League
4 July 2009
19:30

| Suwon Samsung Bluewings | 1 – 0 | Seongnam Ilhwa Chunma |
|---|---|---|
| Tiago 34' | Report |

Suwon World Cup Stadium
Attendance: 20,127
Referee: Choi Kwang-Bo
2009 K-League
18 October 2009
17:00

| Seongnam Ilhwa Chunma | 3 – 2 | Suwon Samsung Bluewings |
|---|---|---|
| Molina 9'; Saša Ognenovski 41'; Radončić 67' | Report | Li Weifeng 20'; Kim Do-Heon 70' |

Seongnam Stadium
Attendance: 17,049
Referee: Ko Kum-Bok

2010 K-League
9 April 2010
19:30

| Suwon Samsung Bluewings | 1 – 2 | Seongnam Ilhwa Chunma |
|---|---|---|
| Ha Tae-Goon 72' | Report | Jo Jae-Cheol 8', 23' |

Suwon World Cup Stadium
Attendance: 18,241
Referee: Lee Min-Hoo
2010 K-League
1 September 2010
19:30

| Seongnam Ilhwa Chunma | 0 – 0 | Suwon Samsung Bluewings |
|---|---|---|
| | Report |

Tancheon Sports Complex
Attendance: 3,986
Referee: Ko Kum-Bok

2011 K-League
15 May 2011
14:10

| Seongnam Ilhwa Chunma | 1 – 1 | Suwon Samsung Bluewings |
|---|---|---|
| Saša Ognenovski 57' (pen.) | Report | Geynrikh 87' |

Tancheon Sports Complex
Attendance: 12,131
Referee: Yoo Seon-Ho
2011 K-League
10 September 2011
18:00

| Suwon Samsung Bluewings | 3 – 2 | Seongnam Ilhwa Chunma |
|---|---|---|
| Stevo 13'; Yeom Ki-Hun 24'; Oh Jang-Eun 84' | Report | Saša Ognenovski 48', 90+2' |

Suwon World Cup Stadium
Attendance: 15,787
Referee: Lee Sam-Ho

2012 K-League
28 April 2012
15:00

| Suwon Samsung Bluewings | 2 – 1 | Seongnam Ilhwa Chunma |
|---|---|---|
| Éverton C. 45'; Stevo 70' | Report | Héverton 2' |

Suwon World Cup Stadium
Attendance: 16,970
Referee: Ko Kum-Bok
2012 K-League
26 August 2012
19:00

| Seongnam Ilhwa Chunma | 1 – 1 | Suwon Samsung Bluewings |
|---|---|---|
| Éverton 37' | Report | Bosnar 50' (f.k.) |

Tancheon Sports Complex
Attendance: 6,388
Referee: Lee Jong-Gook

2013 K League Classic
3 March 2013
14:00

| Seongnam Ilhwa Chunma | 1 – 2 | Suwon Samsung Bluewings |
|---|---|---|
| Hwang Eui-Jo 22' | Report | Seo Jung-Jin 9'; Cho Dong-Gun 72' |

Tancheon Sports Complex
Attendance: 8,059
Referee: Lee Min-Hoo
2013 K League Classic
17 August 2013
19:00

| Suwon Samsung Bluewings | 2 – 2 | Seongnam Ilhwa Chunma |
|---|---|---|
| Cho Dong-Gun 16', 48' | Report | Lee Jong-Won 41'; Kim Seong-Jun 81' |

Suwon World Cup Stadium
Attendance: 22,081
Referee: Lee Min-Hoo

=== League Cup matches ===
- Chunan Ilhwa Chunma vs Suwon Samsung Bluewings (1996-1999)

| Played | Chunan wins | Draws | Suwon wins | Chunan goals | Suwon goals |
|---|---|---|---|---|---|
| 6 | 1 | 2 | 3 | 7 | 10 |

2000 League Cup Final
22 October 2000
15:00

| Seongnam Ilhwa Chunma | 0 – 1 | Suwon Samsung Bluewings |
|---|---|---|
| | Report | Seo Jung-Won 58' |

Dongdaemun Stadium
Attendance: 8,452
Referee: Son Jong-Deok

2001 League Cup
4 April 2001
19:00

| Suwon Samsung Bluewings | 1 – 2 | Seongnam Ilhwa Chunma |
|---|---|---|
| Ko Jong-Soo 52' (f.k.) | Report | Saša Drakulić 9', 65' (pen.) |

Suwon Civic Stadium
Attendance: 8,425
Referee: Lee Kwang-Chul
2001 League Cup
28 April 2001
15:00

| Seongnam Ilhwa Chunma | 0 – 1 | Suwon Samsung Bluewings |
|---|---|---|
| | Report | Sandro 74' |

Seongnam Stadium
Attendance: 4,852
Referee: Son Jong-Deok

2002 League Cup
20 March 2002
19:00

| Suwon Samsung Bluewings | 2 – 3 | Seongnam Ilhwa Chunma |
|---|---|---|
| Denis 28'; Seo Jung-Won 73' | Report | Shin Tae-Yong 9'; Kim Sang-Sik 68'; Kim Dae-Eui 90' |

Suwon Civic Stadium
Attendance: 6,821
Referee: Lim Jong-Ho
2002 League Cup
24 April 2002
19:00

| Seongnam Ilhwa Chunma | 1 – 1 (a.e.t.) | Suwon Samsung Bluewings |
|---|---|---|
| Saša Drakulić 79' | Report | Luțu 61' |
Penalties
| Kim Sang-Sik (penalty scored); Kim Woo-Jae (penalty scored); Kim Hyun-Soo (penalty scored); Kim Dae-Eui (penalty scored); Saša Drakulić (penalty scored) | 5 – 3 | (penalty scored) Cho Hyun-Doo; (penalty scored) Jung Yong-Hoon; (penalty scored) Kim Ki-Bum; (penalty missed) Cho Byung-Kuk |

Seongnam Stadium
Attendance: 4,443
Referee: Kim Young-Joo

2004 League Cup
18 July 2004
19:00

| Seongnam Ilhwa Chunma | 2 – 2 | Suwon Samsung Bluewings |
|---|---|---|
| Kim Do-Hoon 14', 74' | Report | Kim Dae-Eui 7'; Nádson 21' |

Seongnam Stadium
Attendance: 6,253
Referee: Yoo Byung-Seob

2005 League Cup
8 May 2005
15:00

| Suwon Samsung Bluewings | 1 – 0 | Seongnam Ilhwa Chunma |
|---|---|---|
| Kim Dae-Eui 73' | Report |

Suwon World Cup Stadium
Attendance: 22,147
Referee: Kwon Jong-Chul

2006 League Cup
17 May 2006
19:00

| Suwon Samsung Bluewings | 1 – 1 | Seongnam Ilhwa Chunma |
|---|---|---|
| Ko Kyung-Joon 22' | Report | Park Woo-Hyun 11' |

Suwon World Cup Stadium
Attendance: 8,763
Referee: Lee Sang-Yong

2007 League Cup
30 May 2007
19:00

| Suwon Samsung Bluewings | 4 – 1 (a.e.t.) | Seongnam Ilhwa Chunma |
|---|---|---|
| Ahn Jung-Hwan 72'; Baek Ji-Hoon 90'; Nádson 105' (105:27) | Report | Cho Byung-Kuk 44' |

Suwon World Cup Stadium
Attendance: 22,317
Referee: Kim Dong-Jin

=== FA Cup matches ===
- Chunan Ilhwa Chunma vs Suwon Samsung Bluewings (1996-1999)

| Played | Chunan wins | Draws | Suwon wins | Chunan goals | Suwon goals |
|---|---|---|---|---|---|
| 1 | 0 | 0 | 1 | 2 | 5 |

2005 Korean FA Cup Round of 16
18 July 2005
19:00

| Suwon Samsung Bluewings | 3 – 1 | Seongnam Ilhwa Chunma |
|---|---|---|
| Cho Jae-Min 29'; Itamar 49', 90' | Report | Woo Sung-Yong 64' |

Paju Public Stadium

2009 Korean FA Cup Final
8 November 2009
14:00

| Seongnam Ilhwa Chunma | 1 – 1 (a.e.t.) | Suwon Samsung Bluewings |
|---|---|---|
| Radončić 27' | Report | Edu 87' (pen.) |
Penalties
| Saša Ognenovski (penalty scored); Radončić (penalty scored); Kim Sung-hwan (penalty missed); Jeon Kwang-Jin (penalty missed) | 2 – 4 | (penalty scored) Edu; (penalty scored) Yang Sang-Min; (penalty missed) Tiago; (penalty scored) Kim Do-Heon; (penalty scored) Kim Dae-Eui |

Seongnam Stadium
Attendance: 15,364
Referee: Choi Kwang-Bo

2011 Korean FA Cup Final
15 October 2011
14:00

| Seongnam Ilhwa Chunma | 1 – 0 | Suwon Samsung Bluewings |
|---|---|---|
| Cho Dong-Gun 76' | Report |

Tancheon Sports Complex
Attendance: 15,823
Referee: Kim Jong-Hyuk

=== Super Cup matches ===
2000 Korean Super Cup
12 March 2000

| Suwon Samsung Bluewings | 0 – 0 (a.e.t.) | Seongnam Ilhwa Chunma |
Penalties
| | 5 – 4 |

Suwon Civil Stadium
Attendance: 14,021

=== AFC Champions League matches ===
2010 AFC Champions League Quarter-finals 1st leg
15 September 2010
19:30

| Seongnam Ilhwa Chunma | 4 – 1 | Suwon Samsung Bluewings |
|---|---|---|
| Radončić 8', 66'; Molina 33'; Yang Sang-Min 82' (o.g.) | Report | Yeom Ki-Hun 17' |

Tancheon Sports Complex
Attendance: 7,462
Referee: Abdulrahman Abdou (Qatar)
2010 AFC Champions League Quarter-finals 2nd leg
22 September 2010
19:30

| Suwon Samsung Bluewings | 2 – 0 | Seongnam Ilhwa Chunma |
|---|---|---|
| Yeom Ki-Hun 31'; Lee Sang-ho 58' | Report |

Suwon World Cup Stadium
Attendance: 13,076
Referee: Mohsen Basma (Syria)

== Records & Statistics ==
=== All-time results ===
- K League official match statistics are including Chunan Ilhwa Chunma statistics.
- Penalty shoot-outs results are counted as a drawn match.

| Competition | Played | Seongnam wins | Draws | Suwon wins | Seongnam goals | Suwon goals |
|---|---|---|---|---|---|---|
| K League Classic | 46 | 14 | 15 | 17 | 65 | 71 |
| League Cup | 15 | 3 | 5 | 7 | 17 | 24 |
| Korean FA Cup | 4 | 1 | 1 | 2 | 5 | 9 |
| Korean Super Cup | 1 | 0 | 1 | 0 | 0 | 0 |
| AFC Champions League | 2 | 1 | 0 | 1 | 4 | 3 |
| Total | 68 | 19 | 22 | 27 | 91 | 107 |

== Honours ==
| Seongnam Ilhwa Chunma | Championship | Suwon Samsung Bluewings |
|---|---|---|
International (official)
| 0 | FIFA Club World Cup | 0 |
| 2 | AFC Champions League | 2 |
| 0 | AFC Cup | 0 |
| 0 | Asian Super Cup | 2 |
| 0 | Asian Cup Winners' Cup (Defunct) | 0 |
Domestic (official)
| 7 | K League Classic | 4 |
| 3 | League Cup | 6 |
| 2 | FA Cup | 3 |
| 1 | Korean Super Cup (Defunct) | 3 |
International (Defunct, non-official)
| 0 | Pan-Pacific Championship | 1 |
| 1 | Asian Challenge Cup | 0 |
| 0 | Saitama City Cup | 0 |
Regional International (Defunct, non-official)
| 1 | A3 Champions Cup | 1 |

== See also ==
- List of association football rivalries
- List of sports rivalries
- Nationalism and sport
