= 2001 Korean League Cup =

2001 Adidas Cup
Tournament details
- Country: South Korea
- Dates: 25 March – 13 May 2001
- Teams: 10

Final positions
- Champions: Suwon Samsung Bluewings (4th title)
- Runners-up: Busan I'Cons

Tournament statistics
- Matches played: 44
- Goals scored: 113 (2.57 per match)
- Attendance: 645,476 (14,670 per match)
- Top goal scorer: Kim Do-hoon (7 goals)

The 2001 Korean League Cup, also known as the Adidas Cup 2001, was the 15th competition of the Korean League Cup.

== Group stage ==
=== Group A ===
| Pos | Team | Pld | W | OW | PW | L | GF | GA | GD | Pts | Qualification |
|---|---|---|---|---|---|---|---|---|---|---|---|
| 1 | Suwon Samsung Bluewings | 8 | 3 | 2 | 0 | 3 | 10 | 9 | +1 | 13 | Advance to the semi-finals |
| 2 | Seongnam Ilhwa Chunma | 8 | 2 | 3 | 0 | 3 | 10 | 8 | +2 | 12 | Advance to the semi-finals |
| 3 | Pohang Steelers | 8 | 3 | 1 | 0 | 4 | 7 | 8 | −1 | 11 | |
| 4 | Anyang LG Cheetahs | 8 | 2 | 1 | 0 | 5 | 5 | 6 | −1 | 8 | |
| 5 | Jeonnam Dragons | 8 | 2 | 0 | 1 | 5 | 11 | 12 | −1 | 7 | |

Source: RSSSF
March 25
15:00 UTC+9

| Jeonnam Dragons | 2–0 | Seongnam Ilhwa Chunma |
|---|---|---|
| Roh Sang-rae 37', 76' |

Gwangyang Football Stadium
Attendance: 22,802

March 25
15:00 UTC+9

| Pohang Steelers | 1–0 | Anyang LG Cheetahs |
|---|---|---|
| Obeid 61' |

Steelyard Stadium
Attendance: 22,352

March 28
19:00 UTC+9

| Anyang LG Cheetahs | 2–0 | Jeonnam Dragons |
|---|---|---|
| Kim Sung-jae 58'; Koubek 87' |

Anyang Stadium
Attendance: 8,929

March 31
15:00 UTC+9

| Jeonnam Dragons | 3–0 | Suwon Samsung Bluewings |
|---|---|---|
| Cezinha 53', 90+3'; Kim Jong-hyun 73' |

Gwangyang Football Stadium
Attendance: 10,071

April 4
19:00 UTC+9

| Pohang Steelers | 2–1 | Jeonnam Dragons |
|---|---|---|
| Obeid 31'; Sabitović 90' | | Kim Gil-sik 32' |

Steelyard Stadium
Attendance: 12,514

April 4
19:00 UTC+9

| Suwon Samsung Bluewings | 1–2 | Seongnam Ilhwa Chunma |
|---|---|---|
| Ko Jong-soo 52' | | Drakulić 9', 65' (pen.) |

Suwon Civil Stadium
Attendance: 8,425

April 7
15:00 UTC+9

| Seongnam Ilhwa Chunma | 1–2 (a.e.t.) | Pohang Steelers |
|---|---|---|
| Drakulić 74' | | Petreski 40', 97' |

Seongnam 2 Stadium
Attendance: 18,667

April 8
15:00 UTC+9

| Anyang LG Cheetahs | 1–0 | Suwon Samsung Bluewings |
|---|---|---|
| Park Yong-ho 37' |

Anyang Stadium
Attendance: 12,042

April 11
19:00 UTC+9

| Seongnam Ilhwa Chunma | 3–2 (a.e.t.) | Jeonnam Dragons |
|---|---|---|
| Drakulić 23' (pen.); Park Nam-yeol 50'; Park Kang-jo 106' | | Cezinha 27'; Roh Sang-rae 90' (pen.) |

Seongnam 2 Stadium
Attendance: 2,865

April 11
19:00 UTC+9

| Anyang LG Cheetahs | 1–0 (a.e.t.) | Pohang Steelers |
|---|---|---|
| Koubek 104' |

Anyang Stadium
Attendance: 2,139

April 14
15:00 UTC+9

| Jeonnam Dragons | 1–1 (a.e.t.) | Anyang LG Cheetahs |
|---|---|---|
| Shin Jin-won 75' | | André 90+1' |
Penalties
| | 4–1 |

Gwangyang Football Stadium
Attendance: 9,177

April 14
15:00 UTC+9

| Pohang Steelers | 0–2 | Suwon Samsung Bluewings |
|---|---|---|
| | | Laktionov 21', 30' |

Andong Stadium
Attendance: 14,765

April 18
19:00 UTC+9

| Suwon Samsung Bluewings | 3–2 | Jeonnam Dragons |
|---|---|---|
| Sandro Cardoso 24', 90+2'; Laktionov 97' | | Shin Jin-won 52'; Choi Seon-geol 57' |

Suwon Civil Stadium
Attendance: 7,510

April 18
19:00 UTC+9

| Anyang LG Cheetahs | 0–2 | Seongnam Ilhwa Chunma |
|---|---|---|
| | | Park Nam-yeol 1'; Kim Dae-eui 40' |

Anyang Stadium
Attendance: 4,976

April 22
15:00 UTC+9

| Suwon Samsung Bluewings | 2–1 (a.e.t.) | Pohang Steelers |
|---|---|---|
| Cho Hyun-doo 79'; Kim Jin-woo 116' | | Kim Gi-nam 69' |

Suwon Civil Stadium
Attendance: 16,876

April 22
15:00 UTC+9

| Seongnam Ilhwa Chunma | 1–0 (a.e.t.) | Anyang LG Cheetahs |
|---|---|---|
| Drakulić 103' |

Seongnam 2 Stadium
Attendance: 9,638

April 28
15:00 UTC+9

| Jeonnam Dragons | 0–1 | Pohang Steelers |
|---|---|---|
| | | Kim Sang-rok 65' |

Gwangyang Football Stadium
Attendance: 4,125

April 28
15:00 UTC+9

| Seongnam Ilhwa Chunma | 0–1 | Suwon Samsung Bluewings |
|---|---|---|
| | | Sandro Cardoso 74' |

Seongnam 2 Stadium
Attendance: 4,852

May 2
19:00 UTC+9

| Suwon Samsung Bluewings | 1–0 | Anyang LG Cheetahs |
|---|---|---|
| Ko Jong-soo 19' |

Suwon Civil Stadium
Attendance: 16,555

May 2
19:00 UTC+9

| Pohang Steelers | 0–1 (a.e.t.) | Seongnam Ilhwa Chunma |
|---|---|---|
| | | Hwang Yeon-seok 107' |

Steelyard Stadium
Attendance: 10,284

=== Group B ===
| Pos | Team | Pld | W | OW | PW | L | GF | GA | GD | Pts | Qualification |
|---|---|---|---|---|---|---|---|---|---|---|---|
| 1 | Busan I'Cons | 8 | 5 | 1 | 0 | 2 | 17 | 14 | +3 | 17 | Advance to the semi-finals |
| 2 | Jeonbuk Hyundai Motors | 8 | 2 | 2 | 1 | 3 | 14 | 13 | +1 | 11 | Advance to the semi-finals |
| 3 | Daejeon Citizen | 8 | 2 | 2 | 0 | 4 | 14 | 10 | +4 | 10 | |
| 4 | Ulsan Hyundai Horang-i | 8 | 3 | 0 | 0 | 5 | 9 | 13 | −4 | 9 | |
| 5 | Bucheon SK | 8 | 0 | 2 | 0 | 6 | 9 | 13 | −4 | 4 | |

Source: RSSSF
March 25
15:00 UTC+9

| Bucheon SK | 0–0 (a.e.t.) | Jeonbuk Hyundai Motors |
Penalties
| | 7–8 |

Bucheon Stadium
Attendance: 37,421

March 25
15:00 UTC+9

| Daejeon Citizen | 2–0 | Ulsan Hyundai Horang-i |
|---|---|---|
| Gong O-kyun 30'; Lee Kwan-woo 35' |

Daejeon Sports Complex
Attendance: 13,190

March 28
19:00 UTC+9

| Ulsan Hyundai Horang-i | 2–0 | Bucheon SK |
|---|---|---|
| Kim Gi-nam 47', 75' |

Ulsan Sports Complex
Attendance: 12,367

March 28
19:00 UTC+9

| Busan I'Cons | 1–0 | Daejeon Citizen |
|---|---|---|
| Manić 64' |

Busan Gudeok stadium
Attendance: 18,733

April 1
15:00 UTC+9

| Bucheon SK | 1–2 | Busan I'Cons |
|---|---|---|
| Lee Won-shik 26' | | Manić 37'; Urumov 45+1' |

Bucheon Stadium
Attendance: 22,342

April 1
15:00 UTC+9

| Jeonbuk Hyundai Motors | 0–1 | Ulsan Hyundai Horang-i |
|---|---|---|
| | | Marcos 51' (pen.) |

Jeonju Stadium
Attendance: 16,270

April 4
19:00 UTC+9

| Daejeon Citizen | 2–1 (a.e.t.) | Bucheon SK |
|---|---|---|
| Lee Kwan-woo 69' (pen.); Park Kyung-kyu 96' | | Yoon Jung-chun 61' |

Daejeon Sports Complex
Attendance: 5,576

April 4
19:00 UTC+9

| Busan I'Cons | 3–2 | Jeonbuk Hyundai Motors |
|---|---|---|
| Jeon Woo-keun 12'; Manić 43' (pen.); Woo Sung-yong 55' | | Kim Do-hoon 15' (pen.); Park Sung-bae 17' |

Busan Gudeok stadium
Attendance: 16,513

April 7
15:00 UTC+9

| Ulsan Hyundai Horang-i | 3–1 | Busan I'Cons |
|---|---|---|
| Marcos 37' (pen.); Paulinho 84', 86' | | Urumov 57' |

Ulsan Sports Complex
Attendance: 16,325

April 8
15:00 UTC+9

| Jeonbuk Hyundai Motors | 1–2 (a.e.t.) | Daejeon Citizen |
|---|---|---|
| Lee Seok 86' | | Lee Kwan-woo 49'; Park Kyung-kyu 112' |

Jeonju Stadium
Attendance: 7,820

April 11
18:00 UTC+9

| Jeonbuk Hyundai Motors | 3–2 (a.e.t.) | Bucheon SK |
|---|---|---|
| Milošević 16'; Byeon Jae-seop 28'; Park Kyung-hwan 107' | | Ahn Seung-in 58'; Yoon Joong-hui 73' |

Jeonju Stadium
Attendance: 4,120

April 11
19:00 UTC+9

| Ulsan Hyundai Horang-i | 0–4 | Daejeon Citizen |
|---|---|---|
| | | Gong O-kyun 1'; Kim Eun-jung 59'; Atkinson 62'; Kim Dong-seon 76' |

Ulsan Sports Complex
Attendance: 4,236

April 15
15:00 UTC+9

| Bucheon SK | 1–0 (a.e.t.) | Ulsan Hyundai Horang-i |
|---|---|---|
| Lee Won-shik 106' |

Bucheon Stadium
Attendance: 24,512

April 15
15:00 UTC+9

| Daejeon Citizen | 2–3 | Busan I'Cons |
|---|---|---|
| Kim Young-keun 15'; Tak Jun-seok 37' | | Woo Sung-yong 11'; Jeon Woo-keun 56'; Yoon Hee-jun 74' |

Gimcheon Stadium
Attendance: 25,242

April 18
19:00 UTC+9

| Busan I'Cons | 3–2 (a.e.t.) | Bucheon SK |
|---|---|---|
| Woo Sung-yong 49', 117'; Urumov 90+2' | | Kim Gi-dong 35'; Kwak Kyung-keun 76' |

Busan Gudeok stadium
Attendance: 21,407

April 18
15:00 UTC+9

| Ulsan Hyundai Horang-i | 2–3 | Jeonbuk Hyundai Motors |
|---|---|---|
| Jung Jeong-soo 66' (pen.), 89' | | Kim Do-hoon 23', 41' (pen.); Yang Hyun-jeong 36' |

Haman Stadium
Attendance: 15,786

April 29
15:00 UTC+9

| Bucheon SK | 2–1 (a.e.t.) | Daejeon Citizen |
|---|---|---|
| Kwak Kyung-keun 15'; Jo Sung-hwan 102' | | Kim Eun-jung 61' |

Bucheon Stadium
Attendance: 23,739

April 29
15:00 UTC+9

| Jeonbuk Hyundai Motors | 3–2 | Busan I'Cons |
|---|---|---|
| Lee Kyung-soo 42'; Kim Do-hoon 45' (pen.), 77' | | Woo Sung-yong 24' (pen.); Yoon Hui-jun 44' |

Jeonju Stadium
Attendance: 5,820

May 2
19:00 UTC+9

| Busan I'Cons | 2–1 | Ulsan Hyundai Horang-i |
|---|---|---|
| Sim Jae-won 57'; Manić 89' (pen.) | | Jung Jeong-soo 41' |

Busan Gudeok stadium
Attendance: 18,357

May 2
19:00 UTC+9

| Daejeon Citizen | 1–2 (a.e.t.) | Jeonbuk Hyundai Motors |
|---|---|---|
| Jung Young-hoon 3' | | Kim Do-hoon 28', 103' |

Daejeon Sports Complex
Attendance: 17,103

== Knockout stage ==
=== Bracket ===
Semi-finals
A1 | Suwon Samsung Bluewings | 2
B2 | Jeonbuk Hyundai Motors | 1
B1 | Busan I'Cons (p) | 0 (4)
A2 | Seongnam Ilhwa Chunma | 0 (3)

Final
Suwon Samsung Bluewings | 2 | 1 | 3
Busan I'Cons | 0 | 1 | 1

=== Semi-finals ===
May 5
15:00 UTC+9

| Suwon Samsung Bluewings | 2–1 | Jeonbuk Hyundai Motors |
|---|---|---|
| Ko Jong-soo 30', 43' | | Sabo 53' (o.g.) |

Suwon Civil Stadium
Attendance: 28,888

May 5
15:00 UTC+9

| Busan I'Cons | 0–0 (a.e.t.) | Seongnam Ilhwa Chunma |
Penalties
| | 4–3 |

Busan Gudeok stadium
Attendance: 27,822

=== Final ===
May 9
19:00 UTC+9

| Suwon Samsung Bluewings | 2–0 | Busan I'Cons |
|---|---|---|
| Ko Jong-soo 67'; Avdić 86' |

Suwon Civil Stadium
Attendance: 17,712

May 13
15:00 UTC+9

| Busan I'Cons | 1–1 | Suwon Samsung Bluewings |
|---|---|---|
| Manić 61' | | Sandro Cardoso 17' |

Busan Gudeok stadium
Attendance: 34,611

Suwon Samsung Bluewings won 3–1 on aggregate.

== Awards ==
| Award | Player | Team | Points |
|---|---|---|---|
| Top goalscorer | (South Korea) Kim Do-hoon | Jeonbuk Hyundai Motors | 7 goals |
| Top assist provider | (Federal Republic of Yugoslavia) Radivoje Manić | Busan I'Cons | 5 assists |

== See also ==
- 2001 in South Korean football
- 2001 K League
- 2001 Korean FA Cup
