= 2000 Korean FA Cup =

2000 Seoul Bank FA Cup

Tournament details
- Country: South Korea

Final positions
- Champions: Jeonbuk Hyundai Motors (1st title)
- Runners-up: Seongnam Ilhwa Chunma

Tournament statistics
- Top goal scorer: Cezinha (4 goals)

Awards
- Best player: Park Sung-bae

2000 Korean FA Cup, known as the 2000 Seoul Bank FA Cup, was the fifth edition of the Korean FA Cup. It was the first competition to give high school teams qualifications, and two high schools participated.

== Bracket ==
Round of 16
Seongnam Ilhwa Chunma	4
Dankook University	0
Anyang LG Cheetahs	2
Korea University	0
Ulsan Hyundai Horang-i	5
Sungkyunkwan University	2
Busan I'Cons	3
Sangmu FC	2
Bucheon SK	1
Hyundai Mipo Dockyard	0
Gangneung City	0
Suwon Samsung Bluewings	1
Pohang Steelers	2
Korean Police	1
Jeonbuk Hyundai Motors	2
Jeonnam Dragons	1

Quarter-finals
Seongnam Ilhwa Chunma (a.e.t.)	3
Anyang LG Cheetahs	2
Ulsan Hyundai Horang-i	0
Busan I'Cons	1
Bucheon SK	2
Suwon Samsung Bluewings	1
Pohang Steelers	1
Jeonbuk Hyundai Motors (a.e.t.)	2

Semi-finals
Seongnam Ilhwa Chunma (a.e.t.)	1
Busan I'Cons	0
Bucheon SK	1
Jeonbuk Hyundai Motors	2

Final
Seongnam Ilhwa Chunma	0
Jeonbuk Hyundai Motors	2

== First round ==
November 25	Hyundai Mipo Dockyard	3–2	Ajou University	Yeosu Yeocheon Stadium

November 25	Dankook University	3–1	Kookmin Bank	Ulsan Complex Stadium
	Seo Kwan-soo (?)

November 25	Gangneung City	3–2	Bupyeong High School	Yeosu Yeocheon Stadium
	Hwang Dong-su (?); Pak Sung-woon (?)

November 25	Korea University	2–1	Gangneung Agricultural and Technical High School	Ulsan Complex Stadium
	Kim Sang-rok (?); Go Min-ki (?)

November 26	Korean Police	4–1	Kyung Hee University	Yeosu Yeocheon Stadium
	Jung Yong-hoon 42' (?); Jo Man-keun 58'; Lim Kyu-sik (?)		Yoon Won-chul 37'

November 26	Sungkyunkwan University	2–0	Korea Railroad	Ulsan Complex Stadium
	Lee Jung-woon 28', 49'

November 26	Jeonnam Dragons	9–2	Dongguk University	Yeosu Yeocheon Stadium
	Cezinha (?); Divecký (?)

November 26	Sangmu FC	1–0	Daejeon Citizen	Ulsan Complex Stadium

== Round of 16 ==
November 27	Bucheon SK	1–0	Hyundai Mipo Dockyard	Yeosu Yeocheon Stadium
	Cho Jin-ho 1'

November 27	Suwon Samsung Bluewings	1–0	Gangneung City	Yeosu Yeocheon Stadium
	Sandro Cardoso 63'

November 27	Seongnam Ilhwa Chunma	4–0	Dankook University	Ulsan Complex Stadium
	Kim Dae-eui 47'; Kim Hyun-soo 57'; Park Nam-yeol 58', 61'

November 27	Anyang LG Cheetahs	2–0	Korea University	Ulsan Complex Stadium

November 28	Pohang Steelers	2–1	Korean Police	Yeosu Yeocheon Stadium
	Lee Hyun-dong 13'; Park Tae-ha 59'

November 28	Jeonbuk Hyundai Motors	2–1	Jeonnam Dragons	Yeosu Yeocheon Stadium
	Kim Do-hoon 26'; Park Sung-bae 85'		Choi Moon-sik 10'

November 28	Ulsan Hyundai Horang-i	5–2	Sungkyunkwan University	Ulsan Complex Stadium
	Ahn Hong-min (?)

November 28	Busan I'Cons	3–2	Sangmu FC	Ulsan Complex Stadium
	Jang Dae-il 50'; Woo Sung-yong 59'; Manić 73'		Lee Min-sung 1'; Park Byung-joo 47'

== Quarter-finals ==
November 30	Seongnam Ilhwa Chunma	3–2 (a.e.t.)	Anyang LG Cheetahs	Ulsan Complex Stadium
	Kim Sang-sik 45'; Hwang Yeon-seok 59'; Kim Dae-eui 117'		Yoo Sang-soo 21'; Koubek 51'

November 30	Ulsan Hyundai Horang-i	0–1	Busan I'Cons	Ulsan Complex Stadium
			Jeon Woo-keun

November 30	Bucheon SK	2–1	Suwon Samsung Bluewings	Yeosu Yeocheon Stadium
	Lee Won-shik 49'; Ahn Seung-in 63'		Sandro Cardoso 24'

November 30	Pohang Steelers	1–2 (a.e.t.)	Jeonbuk Hyundai Motors	Yeosu Yeocheon Stadium
	? (?)		? (?); Kim Dae-sik 98'

== Semi-finals ==
December 3	Seongnam Ilhwa Chunma	1–0 (a.e.t.)	Busan I'Cons	Jeju Stadium
	Kim In-wan 104'

December 3	Jeonbuk Hyundai Motors	2–1	Bucheon SK	Jeju Stadium
	? (?); Seo Hyuk-su 68'		? (?)

== Final ==
December 5	Seongnam Ilhwa Chunma	0–2	Jeonbuk Hyundai Motors	Jeju Stadium
			Kim Do-hoon 26'; Yang Hyun-jung 59'

== Awards ==
Award	Winner	Team
Most Valuable Player	(South Korea) Park Sung-bae	Jeonbuk Hyundai Motors
Top goalscorer	(Brazil) Cezinha	Jeonnam Dragons

== See also ==
- 2000 in South Korean football
- 2000 K League
- 2000 Korean League Cup
- 2000 Korean League Cup (Supplementary Cup)
