= Adidas Cup =

Football tournament in South Korea

- Organiser(s): K League Federation
- Founded: 1992
- Abolished: 2002
- Region: South Korea

The Adidas Cup was an annual football competition in South Korean football and the Korean League Cup held by the K League Federation from 1992 to 2002.

== Format ==
The Adidas Cup is classified as a cup competition, but its format was similar to typical league until 1997. In 1998, 2001, and 2002, the participating clubs were divided into two groups, and the top two clubs of each group advanced to the knockout stage. In 1999 and 2000, it was held as a knockout tournament.

== Finals ==
Season	Edition	Champions	Score	Runners-up
1992	2	Ilhwa Chunma	2–2	LG Cheetahs
1992	2	Ilhwa Chunma	2–0	LG Cheetahs
1993	3	POSCO Atoms	Round-robin	Hyundai Horang-i
1994	4	Yukong Elephants	Round-robin	LG Cheetahs
1995	5	Hyundai Horang-i	Round-robin	Ilhwa Chunma
1996	6	Bucheon Yukong	Round-robin	Pohang Atoms
1997	7	Busan Daewoo Royals	Round-robin	Jeonnam Dragons
1998	9	Ulsan Hyundai Horang-i	0–0	Bucheon SK
1998	9	Ulsan Hyundai Horang-i	2–1 (a.e.t.)	Bucheon SK
1999	12	Suwon Samsung Bluewings	4–2	Anyang LG Cheetahs
2000	14	Suwon Samsung Bluewings	1–0	Seongnam Ilhwa Chunma
2001	15	Suwon Samsung Bluewings	2–0	Busan I'Cons
2001	15	Suwon Samsung Bluewings	1–1	Busan I'Cons
2002	16	Seongnam Ilhwa Chunma	3–1	Ulsan Hyundai Horang-i
2002	16	Seongnam Ilhwa Chunma	1–1	Ulsan Hyundai Horang-i

== Awards ==
=== Top goalscorer ===
Season	Player	Club	Goals	Apps	Ratio
1992	(South Korea) Noh Soo-jin	Yukong Elephants	5	6	0.83
1993	(South Korea) Choi Moon-sik	POSCO Atoms	3	2	1.50
1994	(South Korea) Im Jae-sun	Hyundai Horang-i	4	6	0.67
1995	(South Korea) Kim Hyun-seok	Hyundai Horang-i	6	7	0.86
1996	(South Korea) Lee Won-shik	Bucheon Yukong	5	6	0.83
1997	(South Korea) Seo Jung-won	Anyang LG Cheetahs	8	9	0.89
1998	(South Korea) Kim Hyun-seok	Ulsan Hyundai Horang-i	11	10	1.10
1999	(Russia) Denis Laktionov	Suwon Samsung Bluewings	3	3	1.00
2000	(South Korea) Ko Jong-soo	Suwon Samsung Bluewings	2	2	1.00
2001	(South Korea) Kim Do-hoon	Jeonbuk Hyundai Motors	7	9	0.78
2002	(Federal Republic of Yugoslavia) Saša Drakulić	Seongnam Ilhwa Chunma	10	11	0.91

=== Top assist provider ===
Season	Player	Club	Assists	Apps	Ratio
1992	(South Korea) Lee Kee-keun	Pohang Steelworks	3	6	0.50
1993	(Argentina) Rubén Bernuncio	Daewoo Royals	2	5	0.40
1994	(South Korea) Cho Jung-hyun	Yukong Elephants	4	5	0.80
1995	(South Korea) Yoon Jung-hwan	Yukong Elephants	3	5	0.60
1996	(South Korea) Yoon Jung-hwan	Buchon Yukong	3	7	0.43
1997	(South Korea) Ko Jong-soo	Suwon Samsung Bluewings	4	8	0.50
1998	(South Korea) Jang Chul-min	Ulsan Hyundai Horang-i	3	9	0.33
1999	(Russia) Denis Laktionov	Suwon Samsung Bluewings	3	3	1.00
2000	(Russia) Denis Laktionov	Suwon Samsung Bluewings	4	3	1.33
2001	(Federal Republic of Yugoslavia) Radivoje Manić	Busan I'Cons	5	11	0.45
2002	(Brazil) Andre	Anyang LG Cheetahs	4	9	0.44

== See also ==
- Korean League Cup
- Korean League Cup (Supplementary Cup)
- Samsung Hauzen Cup
