= 2000 Korean League Cup =

2000 Adidas Cup
Tournament details
- Country: South Korea
- Dates: 14–22 October 2000
- Teams: 10

Final positions
- Champions: Suwon Samsung Bluewings (3rd title)
- Runners-up: Seongnam Ilhwa Chunma

Tournament statistics
- Matches played: 9
- Goals scored: 30 (3.33 per match)
- Attendance: 18,910 (2,101 per match)
- Top goal scorer(s): 5 players (2 goals each)

The Adidas Cup 2000 was the 14th competition of the Korean League Cup, and one of two Korean League Cups held in 2000.

== Bracket ==
First round
Bucheon SK	1
Ulsan Hyundai Horang-i (a.e.t.)	2
Jeonbuk Hyundai Motors	1
Busan I'Cons	2

Quarter-finals
Ulsan Hyundai Horang-i	2
Seongnam Ilhwa Chunma	3
Anyang LG Cheetahs (p)	1 (4)
Daejeon Citizen	1 (3)
Pohang Steelers	0
Suwon Samsung Bluewings	4
Jeonnam Dragons	1
Busan I'Cons	0

Semi-finals
Anyang LG Cheetahs	3
Seongnam Ilhwa Chunma	4
Jeonnam Dragons	2 (2)
Suwon Samsung Bluewings (p)	2 (4)

Final
Seongnam Ilhwa Chunma	0
Suwon Samsung Bluewings	1

== Matches ==
=== First round ===
October 14
15:00 UTC+9

Bucheon SK	1–2 (a.e.t.)	Ulsan Hyundai Horang-i
Lee Won-shik 83'		Kim Gi-nam 45+2'; Son Jeong-tak 93'

Dongdaemun Stadium
Attendance: 857

October 14
17:00 UTC+9

Jeonbuk Hyundai Motors	1–2	Busan I'Cons
Seo Hyuk-su 71'		Jeon Woo-keun 30'; Lee Gi-bu 36'

Dongdaemun Stadium
Attendance: 857

=== Quarter-finals ===
October 15
15:00 UTC+9

Pohang Steelers	0–4	Suwon Samsung Bluewings
		Jang Ji-hyun 30'; Park Kun-ha 45+1'; Laktionov 60'; Ko Jong-soo 66'

Dongdaemun Stadium
Attendance: 1,892

October 15
17:00 UTC+9

Anyang LG Cheetahs	1–1 (a.e.t.)	Daejeon Citizen
Wang Jung-hyun 39'		Jang Cheol-woo 86'
Penalties
	4–3

Dongdaemun Stadium
Attendance: 1,892

October 17
17:00 UTC+9

Jeonnam Dragons	1–0	Busan I'Cons
Maciel 14'

Dongdaemun Stadium
Attendance: 823

October 17
19:00 UTC+9

Ulsan Hyundai Horang-i	2–3	Seongnam Ilhwa Chunma
Ha Eun-cheol 51'; Kim Byung-ji 83' (pen.)		Kim Dae-eui 61'; Kim Hyun-soo 66'; Shin Tae-yong 77'

Dongdaemun Stadium
Attendance: 823

=== Semi-finals ===
October 20
16:00 UTC+9

Anyang LG Cheetahs	3–4	Seongnam Ilhwa Chunma
Wang Jung-hyun 9'; André 52'; Jung Kwang-min 71'		Lee Sang-yoon 16' (pen.), 73'; Mun Sam-jin 76'; Kim Hyun-soo 81'

Dongdaemun Stadium
Attendance: 1,657

October 20
18:00 UTC+9

Jeonnam Dragons	2–2 (a.e.t.)	Suwon Samsung Bluewings
Roh Sang-rae 9'; Song Jung-hyun 69'		Ko Jong-soo 40'; Seo Jung-won 89'
Penalties
	2–4

Dongdaemun Stadium
Attendance: 1,657

=== Final ===
October 22
15:00 UTC+9

Seongnam Ilhwa Chunma	0–1	Suwon Samsung Bluewings
		Seo Jung-won 58'

Dongdaemun Stadium
Attendance: 8,452

== Awards ==
Award	Player	Team	Points
Top goalscorer	(South Korea) Ko Jong-soo	Suwon Samsung Bluewings	2 goals
Top assist provider	(Russia) Denis Laktionov	Suwon Samsung Bluewings	4 assists

== See also ==
- 2000 in South Korean football
- 2000 Korean League Cup (Supplementary Cup)
- 2000 K League
- 2000 Korean FA Cup
