= 1997 Korean League Cup (Supplementary Cup) =

1997 Pro-Specs Cup
Tournament details
- Country: South Korea
- Dates: 7 May – 15 October 1997
- Teams: 10

Final positions
- Champions: Busan Daewoo Royals (2nd title)
- Runners-up: Pohang Steelers

Tournament statistics
- Matches played: 44
- Goals scored: 111 (2.52 per match)
- Top goal scorer: Radivoje Manić (6 goals)

The Pro-Specs Cup 1997 was the eighth competition of the Korean League Cup, and one of two Korean League Cups held in 1997.

== Group stage ==
=== Group A ===
Pos	Team	Pld	W	D	L	GF	GA	GD	Pts	Qualification
1	Pohang Steelers	8	4	4	0	11	5	+6	16	Advance to the semi-finals
2	Jeonnam Dragons	8	4	4	0	11	6	+5	16	Advance to the semi-finals
3	Anyang LG Cheetahs	8	2	4	2	12	11	+1	10	
4	Ulsan Hyundai Horang-i	8	2	2	4	9	11	−2	8	
5	Jeonbuk Hyundai Dinos	8	0	2	6	5	15	−10	2	

Source: RSSSF
May 14

Pohang Steelers	1–1	Anyang LG Cheetahs
Park Ji-ho 67'		Kim Jong-yeon 85'

Steelyard Stadium
Attendance: 7,540

May 14

Jeonnam Dragons	3–1	Ulsan Hyundai Horang-i
Kim Bong-gil 42'; Kim Do-keun 66'; Kim Ki-seon 86'		Jeannot 3'

Gwangyang Football Stadium
Attendance: 9,750

May 21

Jeonbuk Hyundai Dinos	0–0	Jeonnam Dragons

Iksan Stadium
Attendance: 1,127

May 22

Anyang LG Cheetahs	0–0	Ulsan Hyundai Horang-i

Anyang Stadium
Attendance: 5,327

June 4

Ulsan Hyundai Horang-i	2–1	Jeonbuk Hyundai Dinos
Song Ju-seok 53'; Kim Hyun-seok 86'		Kim Do-hoon 47'

Ulsan Sports Complex
Attendance: 1,350

June 4

Pohang Steelers	1–1	Jeonnam Dragons
Jang Yeong-hun 19'		Kim Ki-seon 58'

Steelyard Stadium
Attendance: 5,329

June 25

Jeonbuk Hyundai Dinos	1–1	Anyang LG Cheetahs
Savov 24' (pen.)		Cho Byung-young 77'

Gunsan Stadium
Attendance: 227

June 25

Ulsan Hyundai Horang-i	0–1	Pohang Steelers
		Hong Do-pyo 56'

Ulsan Sports Complex
Attendance: 1,114

July 9

Anyang LG Cheetahs	2–2	Jeonnam Dragons
Shaka 27', 50'		Kim Do-keun 83', 90'

Anyang Stadium
Attendance: 4,732

July 23

Jeonnam Dragons	2–1	Anyang LG Cheetahs
Kim Do-keun 74'; Kim In-wan 76'		Maciel 66' (o.g.)

Gwangyang Football Stadium
Attendance: 6,520

July 23

Pohang Steelers	2–1	Jeonbuk Hyundai Dinos
Kim Myeong-gon 2'; Park Tae-ha 86'		Choi Jin-cheul 29'

Steelyard Stadium
Attendance: 11,475

July 9

Jeonbuk Hyundai Dinos	0–2	Pohang Steelers
		Hong Do-pyo 23'; Oostrom 38'

Gunsan Stadium
Attendance: 167

August 13

Anyang LG Cheetahs	4–1	Jeonbuk Hyundai Dinos
Kim Dae-seong 19'; Park Jong-in 39'; Yun Sang-cheol 70', 90+'		Kim Yong-gap 21'

Anyang Stadium
Attendance: 3,002

August 13

Pohang Steelers	1–1	Ulsan Hyundai Horang-i
Konovalov 87'		Lee Hyun-seok 52'

Steelyard Stadium
Attendance: 5,983

August 27

Jeonbuk Hyundai Dinos	1–3	Ulsan Hyundai Horang-i
Lee Gyeong-chun 59'		Hwang Seung-ju 19'; Kim Gi-nam 28'; Seo Dong-won 37'

Jeonju Stadium
Attendance: 485

August 27

Jeonnam Dragons	0–0	Pohang Steelers

Gwangyang Football Stadium
Attendance: 12,837

September 10

Ulsan Hyundai Horang-i	1–2	Anyang LG Cheetahs
Park Jong-wook 90+'		Kabongo 56'; Kwon Tae-gyu 72'

Ulsan Sports Complex
Attendance: 2,456

September 10

Jeonnam Dragons	1–0	Jeonbuk Hyundai Dinos
Skachenko 33'

Gwangyang Football Stadium
Attendance: 10,152

September 24

Anyang LG Cheetahs	1–3	Pohang Steelers
Kim Jong-yeon 57'		Konovalov 8'; Jang Yeong-hun 87'; Jeon Kyung-joon 90+' (pen.)

Anyang Stadium
Attendance: 9,540

September 24

Ulsan Hyundai Horang-i	1–2	Jeonnam Dragons
Kim Hyun-su 88' (o.g.)		Kim In-wan 53', 67'

Ulsan Sports Complex
Attendance: 2,567

=== Group B ===
Pos	Team	Pld	W	D	L	GF	GA	GD	Pts	Qualification
1	Busan Daewoo Royals	8	5	2	1	13	8	+5	17	Advance to the semi-finals
2	Suwon Samsung Bluewings	8	5	1	2	13	10	+3	16	Advance to the semi-finals
3	Bucheon Yukong	8	3	3	2	14	10	+4	12	
4	Cheonan Ilhwa Chunma	8	3	1	4	6	9	−3	10	
5	Daejeon Citizen	8	0	1	7	5	14	−9	1	

Source: RSSSF
May 7

Daejeon Citizen	0–3	Suwon Samsung Bluewings
		Matveyev 23'; Han Sang-yeol 60', 76'

Daejeon Sports Complex
Attendance: 346

May 7

Cheonan Ilhwa Chunma	0–0	Busan Daewoo Royals

Chungnam Cheonan Stadium
Attendance: 518

May 21

Suwon Samsung Bluewings	3–2	Busan Daewoo Royals
Cho Hyun-doo 16' (pen.); Matveyev 45'; Han Sang-yeol 86'		Kim Hyun-soo 18'; Kim Sang-mun 55'

Suwon Civil Stadium
Attendance: 3,851

May 21

Bucheon Yukong	3–1	Cheonan Ilhwa Chunma
Oh Gyung-seok 1', 45+'; Park Sung-cheol 39'		Rubenilson 6'

Mokdong Stadium
Attendance: 122

June 4

Busan Daewoo Royals	2–1	Bucheon Yukong
Turković 16'; Drakulić 50' (pen.)		Yun Jeong-chun 57'

Busan Gudeok stadium
Attendance: 19,232

June 4

Daejeon Citizen	0–1	Cheonan Ilhwa Chunma
		Kim Lee-ju 9'

Daejeon Sports Complex
Attendance: 1,417

June 25

Bucheon Yukong	3–0	Suwon Samsung Bluewings
Lee Won-shik 16'; Burdin 72'; Yoon Jung-hwan 75'

Mokdong Stadium
Attendance: 526

June 25

Busan Daewoo Royals	1–0	Daejeon Citizen
Manić 90'

Namhae Stadium
Attendance: 11,523

July 9

Suwon Samsung Bluewings	2–0	Cheonan Ilhwa Chunma
Cho Hyun-doo 67'; Badea 77'

Suwon Civil Stadium
Attendance: 8,930

July 9

Daejeon Citizen	2–2	Bucheon Yukong
Kim Hyun-min 27'; Jeong Seong-cheon 38'		Vostrosablin 31' (pen.); Somogyi 58' (pen.)

Daejeon Sports Complex
Attendance: 1,126

July 23

Cheonan Ilhwa Chunma	1–2	Suwon Samsung Bluewings
Kim Gyung-beom 84'		Matveyev 49'; Badea 90'

Chungnam Cheonan Stadium
Attendance: 1,524

July 23

Bucheon Yukong	3–2	Daejeon Citizen
Lee Won-shik 2'; Vostrosablin 37', 88'		Sin Jin-won 33'; Ha Geum-jin 90+'

Mokdong Stadium
Attendance: 1,982

August 13

Suwon Samsung Bluewings	1–1	Bucheon Yukong
Sin Seong-hwan 43'		Kim Gi-dong 20'

Suwon Civil Stadium
Attendance: 9,767

August 13

Daejeon Citizen	1–2	Busan Daewoo Royals
Kim Tae-wan 2'		Manić 34', 88'

Daejeon Sports Complex
Attendance: 675

August 27

Bucheon Yukong	1–1	Busan Daewoo Royals
Kim Gi-dong 56'		Manić 45'

Mokdong Stadium
Attendance: 3,182

August 27

Cheonan Ilhwa Chunma	1–0	Daejeon Citizen
Hwang Yeon-seok 50'

Chungnam Cheonan Stadium
Attendance: 785

September 10

Busan Daewoo Royals	3–1	Suwon Samsung Bluewings
Jung Jae-kwon 21'; Drakulić 82'; Manić 90+'		Olăroiu 58'

Busan Gudeok stadium
Attendance: 8,813

September 10

Cheonan Ilhwa Chunma	1–0	Bucheon Yukong
Shin Tae-yong 7'

Chungnam Cheonan Stadium
Attendance: 1,104

September 24

Suwon Samsung Bluewings	1–0	Daejeon Citizen
Matveyev 29'

Suwon Civil Stadium
Attendance: 4,973

September 24

Busan Daewoo Royals	2–1	Cheonan Ilhwa Chunma
Esteves 18' (pen.); Vlahovic 51'		Kim Lee-ju 75'

Milyang Stadium
Attendance: 17,562

== Knockout stage ==
=== Bracket ===
Semi-finals
A1	Pohang Steelers	4
B2	Suwon Samsung Bluewings	0
B1	Busan Daewoo Royals	3
A2	Jeonnam Dragons	1

Final
Pohang Steelers	1	0	1
Busan Daewoo Royals	1	2	3

=== Semi-finals ===
October 1

Pohang Steelers	4–0	Suwon Samsung Bluewings
Obeid 24'; Hong Do-pyo 27'; Park Ji-ho 78' (pen.); Konovalov 90'

Steelyard Stadium
Attendance: 7,295

October 1

Busan Daewoo Royals	3–1	Jeonnam Dragons
Kim Hyun-soo 11'; Drakulić 26', 37'		Kim Ki-seon 70' (pen.)

Busan Gudeok stadium
Attendance: 6,232

=== Final ===
October 8

Pohang Steelers	1–1	Busan Daewoo Royals
Konovalov 78'		Jung Jae-kwon 9'

Steelyard Stadium
Attendance: 12,500

October 15

Busan Daewoo Royals	2–0	Pohang Steelers
Manić 35' (pen.); Drakulić 53' (pen.)

Busan Gudeok stadium
Attendance: 18,622

Busan Daewoo Royals won 3–1 on aggregate.

== Awards ==
Award	Player	Team	Points
Top goalscorer	(Federal Republic of Yugoslavia) Radivoje Manić	Busan Daewoo Royals	6 goals
Top assist provider	(Russia) Oleg Yelyshev	Anyang LG Cheetahs	5 assists

== See also ==
- 1997 in South Korean football
- 1997 Korean League Cup
- 1997 K League
- 1997 Korean FA Cup
