= Jung Kwang-seok =

South Korean footballer and manager (born 1970)

Jung Kwang-Seok 정광석
Personal information
- Full name: Jung Kwang-Seok (정광석)
- Date of birth: December 1, 1970 (age 55)
- Place of birth: South Korea
- Position: Defender

Team information
- Current team: Yongin City

Youth career
- 1989–1992: Sungkyunkwan University

Senior career*
Years	Team	Apps	(Gls)
1993–1998	Pusan Daewoo Royals	46	(1)
1995–1996	→ Sangmu (Military service)		

International career
1987	South Korea U-17		
1991–1992	South Korea U-23	8	(0)
1990–1992	South Korea	8	(0)

Managerial career
- 2002–2004: Yongin FC U-15
- 2007–2008: Chunnam Dragons U-15
- 2009: Chunnam Dragons (Scout)
- 2010–: Yongin City
Medal record
Representing South Korea
Men's football
Asian Games
Bronze medal – third place	1990 Beijing	Team
- * Club domestic league appearances and goals

Jung Kwang-Seok (Korean: 정광석, born December 1, 1970) is a retired South Korean football player and football manager. He manages Korea National League side Yongin City FC.

He was a member of the South Korea U-23 team at the 1992 Summer Olympics and of the South Korea team at the 1990 Asian Games and 1990 Dynasty Cup.

== Honors ==
=== Club ===
Busan Daewoo Royals

- K-League Cup Champions (1) : 1997
- Supplementary League Cup Champions (1) : 1998

=== National team ===
South Korea

- Dynasty Cup Champions (1) : 1990
- Asian Games Bronze medal (1) : 1990

=== Individual ===
- K-League Rookie of the Year : 1993

== Career statistics ==
Appearances and goals by club, season and competition
Club	Season	League			FA Cup		K-League Cup		Asia		Total	
Club	Season	Division	Apps	Goals	Apps	Goals	Apps	Goals	Apps	Goals	Apps	Goals
Busan Daewoo Royals	1993	K-League	21	0	-		5	0	-		26	0
Busan Daewoo Royals	1994	K-League	9	0	-		5	1	-		14	1
Busan Daewoo Royals	1997	K-League	11	1			15	1	-			
Busan Daewoo Royals	1998	K-League	5	0			8	0				
Career total			46	1			33	2				
