= Samsung Hauzen Cup =

- Organising body: K League Federation
- Founded: 2004
- Abolished: 2008
- Region: South Korea

The Samsung Hauzen Cup was an annual football competition in South Korean football, and the Korean League Cup held by the K League Federation from 2004 to 2008. This competition was created to allow domestic football while the activity of the South Korean national team was increased.

== Finals ==
Season	Edition	Champions	Score	Runners-up
2004	17	Seongnam Ilhwa Chunma	Round-robin	Daejeon Citizen
2005	18	Suwon Samsung Bluewings	Round-robin	Ulsan Hyundai Horang-i
2006	19	FC Seoul	Round-robin	Seongnam Ilhwa Chunma
2007	20	Ulsan Hyundai Horang-i	2–1	FC Seoul
2008	21	Suwon Samsung Bluewings	2–0	Jeonnam Dragons

== Awards ==
=== Top goalscorer ===
Season	Player	Club	Goals	Apps	Ratio
2004	(Brazil) Zé Carlos	Ulsan Hyundai Horang-i	7	7	1.00
2005	(Brazil) Sandro Hiroshi	Daegu FC	7	12	0.58
2006	(South Korea) Choi Sung-kuk	Ulsan Hyundai Horang-i	8	13	0.62
2007	(Brazil) Luizinho	Daegu FC	7	9	0.78
2008	(Brazil) Eninho	Daegu FC	9	8	1.13

=== Top assist provider ===
Season	Player	Club	Assists	Apps	Ratio
2004	(Brazil) Tavares	Pohang Steelers	5	11	0.45
2005	(Brazil) Paulo César	Jeonbuk Hyundai Motors	5	9	0.56
2006	(Brazil) Dudu	Seongnam Ilhwa Chunma	5	9	0.56
2007	(South Korea) Lee Chung-yong	FC Seoul	5	8	0.63
2008	(South Korea) Byun Sung-hwan	Jeju United	3	9	0.33

== See also ==
- Korean League Cup
- Adidas Cup
- Korean League Cup (Supplementary Cup)
