= Korean League Cup (Supplementary Cup) =

Football compition

The K League Federation launched other league cups in addition to the Adidas Cup from 1997 to 2000.

== Finals ==
Season	Edition	Competition	Champions	Score	Runners-up
1997+	8	Pro-Specs Cup	Busan Daewoo Royals	1–1	Pohang Steelers
1997+	8	Pro-Specs Cup	Busan Daewoo Royals	2–0	Pohang Steelers
1998+	10	Philip Morris Korea Cup	Busan Daewoo Royals	Round-robin	Bucheon SK
1999+	11	Daehan Fire Insurance Cup	Suwon Samsung Bluewings	1–0	Busan Daewoo Royals
1999+	11	Daehan Fire Insurance Cup	Suwon Samsung Bluewings	1–1	Busan Daewoo Royals
2000+	13	Daehan Fire Insurance Cup	Bucheon SK	2–1 (a.e.t.)	Jeonnam Dragons

== Awards ==
=== Top goalscorer ===
Season	Player	Club	Goals	Apps	Ratio
1997+	(Federal Republic of Yugoslavia) Radivoje Manić	Busan Daewoo Royals	6	7	0.86
1998+	(South Korea) Kim Jong-kun	Ulsan Hyundai Horang-i	7	9	0.78
1999+	(South Korea) Kim Jong-kun	Ulsan Hyundai Horang-i	6	8	0.75
2000+	(South Korea) Lee Won-shik	Buchon SK	6	10	0.60

=== Top assist provider ===
Season	Player	Club	Assists	Apps	Ratio
1997+	(Russia) Oleg Yelyshev	Anyang LG Cheetahs	5	7	0.71
1998+	(South Korea) Yoon Jung-hwan	Bucheon SK	4	8	0.50
1999+	(South Korea) Jo Sung-hwan	Bucheon SK	4	8	0.50
2000+	(South Korea) Jeon Kyung-jun	Bucheon SK	4	9	0.44

== See also ==
- Korean League Cup
- Adidas Cup
- Samsung Hauzen Cup
