= Gong Oh-kyun =

South Korean footballer

Gong Oh-kyun 공오균
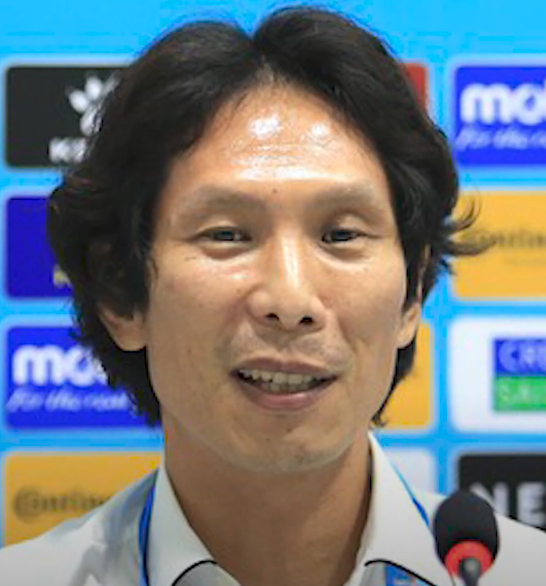
- Gong Oh-kyun in 2022

Personal information
- Date of birth: 10 September 1974 (age 52)
- Place of birth: Gimpo, Gyeonggi, South Korea
- Position: Forward

Senior career*
Years	Team	Apps	(Gls)
1997–2006	Daejeon Citizen FC	291	(39)
2007–2008	Gyeongnam FC	28	(5)
2009	Sunshine Coast FC	20	(9)

International career
1996	South Korea U-23		

Managerial career
- 2015: Shenzhen (Assistant)
- 2016: South Korea U-18
- 2016: South Korea U-17 (Assistant)
- 2016–2017: South Korea U-20 (Assistant)
- 2017–2018: South Korea U-23 (Assistant)
- 2018–2019: South Korea U-20 (Assistant)
- 2020–2021: Indonesia U-20 (Assistant)
- 2020–2021: Indonesia (Assistant)
- 2021: Seoul E-Land (Assistant)
- 2022: Vietnam U-23
- 2023: Cong An Ha Noi
- 2023: Cong An Ha Noi (youth)
- * Club domestic league appearances and goals

Gong Oh-kyun (Korean: 공오균, Hanja: 孔五均; born 10 September 1974) is a South Korean football manager and former player.

== Managerial statistics ==
As of match played 10 March 2026

Managerial record by team and tenure
Team	From	To	Record					Ref.
Team	From	To	Pld	W	D	L	Win %	Ref.
Vietnam U23	24 May 2022	31 March 2023	5	1	2	2	20.00	
Công An Hà Nội	12 November 2023	15 January 2024	6	2	2	2	33.33	

== Club career ==
He played for Daejeon Citizen for 10 seasons and appeared in 291 games for this club, scored 38 goals and made 18 assists. In 2009, he also joined the Australian semi-professional club Sunshine Coast FC.

== Managerial career ==
In May 2022, he was appointed as the manager of Vietnam national under-23 football team. He left the position in December 2022 to finish his FIFA Pro license. In 2023, he returned back to Vietnam to manage Hanoi Police.

== Personal life ==
He has a Teaching Certificate of Physical Education, Level 2 and Asian Football Confederation Coaching License Level A (eligible to coach up to professional level) and Bachelor of Physical Education, Kwandong University (graduated in 1997), Graduate School of Public Health, Konyang University (graduated in 2006), publishing a thesis researching "Study on improvement of dietary patterns and intake status of health functional foods in adult soccer players."

== Career statistics ==
=== Club ===
Club performance			League		Cup		League Cup		Continental		Total	
Season	Club	League	Apps	Goals	Apps	Goals	Apps	Goals	Apps	Goals	Apps	Goals
South Korea			League		KFA Cup		League Cup		Asia		Total	
1997	Daejeon Citizen	K-League	17	0	?	?	16	1	-			
1998	Daejeon Citizen	K-League	10	1	?	?	15	4	-			
1999	Daejeon Citizen	K-League	22	6	?	?	9	0	-			
2000	Daejeon Citizen	K-League	20	2	?	?	4	0	-			
2001	Daejeon Citizen	K-League	21	7	?	?	8	2	-			
2002	Daejeon Citizen	K-League	14	1	?	?	6	0	?	?		
2003	Daejeon Citizen	K-League	31	5	3	0	-		?	?		
2004	Daejeon Citizen	K-League	22	1	4	1	10	3	-		36	5
2005	Daejeon Citizen	K-League	21	2	0	0	9	1	-		30	3
2006	Daejeon Citizen	K-League	24	1	1	1	12	1	-		37	3
2007	Gyeongnam FC	K-League	13	2	1	0	1	0	-		15	2
2008	Gyeongnam FC	K-League	9	3	0	0	5	3	-		14	6
Australia			League		Cup		League Cup		Oceania/Asia		Total	
2009	Sunshine Coast	Queensland State League							-			
Total	South Korea		224	31			95	12				
Total	Australia											
Career total			224	31			95	12				
