= 2000 Korean League Cup (Supplementary Cup) =

2000 Daehan Fire Insurance Cup
Tournament details
- Country: South Korea
- Dates: 19 March – 5 May 2000
- Teams: 10

Final positions
- Champions: Bucheon SK (3rd title)
- Runners-up: Jeonnam Dragons

Tournament statistics
- Top goal scorer: Lee Won-shik (6 goals)

The Daehan Fire Insurance Cup 2000 was the 13th competition of the Korean League Cup, and one of two Korean League Cups held in 2000.

== Group stage ==
=== Group A ===
Pos	Team	Pld	W	OW	PW	L	GF	GA	GD	Pts	Qualification	BCH	PHS	JHM	SSB	ALG
1	Bucheon SK	8	3	2	1	2	13	10	+3	14	Advance to the semi-finals	—	1–0	1–2	1–0	1–2 (a.e.t.)
2	Pohang Steelers	8	3	1	0	4	9	7	+2	11	Advance to the semi-finals	1–2 (a.e.t.)	—	2–0	1–2 (a.e.t.)	0–1
3	Jeonbuk Hyundai Motors	8	3	0	0	5	10	11	−1	9		2–3 (a.e.t.)	0–2	—	2–0	2–1
4	Suwon Samsung Bluewings	8	1	1	2	4	9	11	−2	7		1–1 (a.e.t.) (5–6 p)	1–2 (a.e.t.)	0–0 (a.e.t.) (5–4 p)	—	5–4
5	Anyang LG Cheetahs	8	1	1	1	5	12	14	−2	6		2–3	0–1	2–2 (a.e.t.) (4–3 p)	0–0 (a.e.t.) (4–5 p)	—

Source: RSSSF

=== Group B ===
Pos	Team	Pld	W	OW	PW	L	GF	GA	GD	Pts	Qualification	JND	SIC	USH	BIC	DJC
1	Jeonnam Dragons	8	3	1	2	2	13	8	+5	13	Advance to the semi-finals	—	0–0 (a.e.t.) (3–2 p)	3–4 (a.e.t.)	3–1	1–1 (a.e.t.) (5–3 p)
2	Seongnam Ilhwa Chunma	8	4	0	0	4	10	7	+3	12	Advance to the semi-finals	1–0	—	1–2	0–1	2–1
3	Ulsan Hyundai Horang-i	8	3	1	1	3	9	9	0	12		1–2	0–2	—	1–0	0–0 (a.e.t.) (3–2 p)
4	Busan I'Cons	8	2	1	0	5	6	10	−4	8		0–1 (a.e.t.)	0–4	1–0 (a.e.t.)	—	0–0 (a.e.t.) (2–4 p)
5	Daejeon Citizen	8	1	0	1	6	6	10	−4	4		0–3	3–0	0–1	1–3	—

Source: RSSSF

== Knockout stage ==
=== Bracket ===
Semi-finals
A1	Bucheon SK	3
B2	Seongnam Ilhwa Chunma	1
B1	Jeonnam Dragons (a.e.t.)	1
A2	Pohang Steelers	0

Final
Bucheon SK (a.e.t.)	2
Jeonnam Dragons	1

=== Semi-finals ===
2 May

Bucheon SK	3–1	Seongnam Ilhwa Chunma
Silvera 45+', 71'; Lee Won-shik 79'		Lee Sang-yoon 10'

2 May

Jeonnam Dragons	1–0 (a.e.t.)	Pohang Steelers
Roh Sang-rae 106'

=== Final ===
5 May

Bucheon SK	2–1 (a.e.t.)	Jeonnam Dragons
Lee Lim-saeng 15'; Cho Jin-ho 94'		César 21'

Seoul Olympic Stadium, Seoul

== Awards ==
Award	Player	Team	Points
Top goalscorer	(South Korea) Lee Won-shik	Bucheon SK	6 goals
Top assist provider	(South Korea) Jeon Kyung-jun	Bucheon SK	4 assists

== See also ==
- 2000 in South Korean football
- 2000 Korean League Cup
- 2000 K League
- 2000 Korean FA Cup
