= Koubek =

Koubek (feminine: Koubková) is a Czech surname. Notable people with the surname include:

- František Koubek (born 1969), Czech footballer
- Greg Koubek (born 1969), American basketball player
- Miroslav Koubek (born 1951), Czech footballer and manager
- Stefan Koubek (born 1977), Austrian tennis player
- Tomáš Koubek (born 1992), Czech footballer
- Vlastimil Koubek (1927–2003), Czech-American architect
- Zdeněk Koubek (1913–1986), Czech athlete
