= 2005 Korean League Cup =

2005 Samsung Hauzen Cup
Tournament details
- Country: South Korea
- Dates: 6 March – 8 May 2005
- Teams: 13

Final positions
- Champions: Suwon Samsung Bluewings (5th title)
- Runners-up: Ulsan Hyundai Horang-i

Tournament statistics
- Matches played: 78
- Goals scored: 163 (2.09 per match)
- Top goal scorer: Sandro Hiroshi (7 goals)

The 2005 Korean League Cup, also known as the 2005 Samsung Hauzen Cup, was the 18th competition of the Korean League Cup. It was a League Cup, but was run like a league format in this year. All teams played each other once, playing 12 matches each.

== Table ==
Pos	Team	Pld	W	D	L	GF	GA	GD	Pts
1	Suwon Samsung Bluewings (C)	12	7	4	1	20	11	+9	25
2	Ulsan Hyundai Horang-i	12	6	5	1	17	11	+6	23
3	Pohang Steelers	12	4	8	0	13	9	+4	20
4	Bucheon SK	12	5	3	4	14	13	+1	18
5	FC Seoul	12	5	2	5	18	18	0	17
6	Incheon United	12	4	3	5	9	10	−1	15
7	Daegu FC	12	4	3	5	16	18	−2	15
8	Seongnam Ilhwa Chunma	12	3	5	4	9	9	0	14
9	Jeonnam Dragons	12	3	5	4	11	12	−1	14
10	Daejeon Citizen	12	3	4	5	9	11	−2	13
11	Gwangju Sangmu	12	3	3	6	7	13	−6	12
12	Jeonbuk Hyundai Motors	12	2	5	5	12	14	−2	11
13	Busan IPark	12	2	4	6	8	14	−6	10

Source: RSSSF
(C) Champions

== Awards ==
Award	Player	Team	Points
Top goalscorer	(Brazil) Sandro Hiroshi	Daegu FC	7 goals
Top assist provider	(Brazil) Paulo César	Jeonbuk Hyundai Motors	5 assists

== See also ==
- 2005 in South Korean football
- 2005 K League
- 2005 Korean FA Cup
