= K League Young Player of the Year Award =

The K League Young Player of the Year Award is an award of the K League annual awards. It is given to the best player among under-23 K League players. It was established in the name of "Rookie of the Year" in 1985, and was renamed "Young Player of the Year" in 2013. It was also given to K League 2 players since 2020.

== Winners ==
=== K League 1 award ===
Season	Player	Position	Club
1985	Lee Heung-sil	Midfielder	POSCO Atoms
1986	Ham Hyun-gi	Forward	Hyundai Horang-i
1987	Kim Joo-sung	Forward	Daewoo Royals
1988	Hwangbo Kwan	Midfielder	Yukong Elephants
1989	Ko Jeong-woon	Midfielder	Ilhwa Chunma
1990	Song Ju-seok	Forward	Hyundai Horang-i
1991	Cho Woo-seok	Defender	Ilhwa Chunma
1992	Shin Tae-yong	Midfielder	Ilhwa Chunma
1993	Jung Kwang-seok	Defender	Daewoo Royals
1994	Choi Yong-soo	Forward	LG Cheetahs
1995	Roh Sang-rae	Forward	Jeonnam Dragons
1996	Park Kun-ha	Forward	Suwon Samsung Bluewings
1997	Shin Jin-won	Midfielder	Daejeon Citizen
1998	Lee Dong-gook	Forward	Pohang Steelers
1999	Lee Sung-jae	Forward	Bucheon SK
2000	Yang Hyun-jung	Midfielder	Jeonbuk Hyundai Motors
2001	Song Chong-gug	Midfielder	Busan I'Cons
2002	Lee Chun-soo	Forward	Ulsan Hyundai Horang-i
2003	Jung Jo-gook	Forward	Anyang LG Cheetahs
2004	Moon Min-kui	Midfielder	Pohang Steelers
2005	Park Chu-young	Forward	FC Seoul
2006	Yeom Ki-hun	Midfielder	Jeonbuk Hyundai Motors
2007	Ha Tae-kyun	Forward	Suwon Samsung Bluewings
2008	Lee Seung-yeoul	Forward	FC Seoul
2009	Kim Young-hoo	Forward	Gangwon FC
2010	Yoon Bit-garam	Midfielder	Gyeongnam FC
2011	Lee Seung-gi	Midfielder	Gwangju FC
2012	Lee Myung-joo	Midfielder	Pohang Steelers
2013	Ko Moo-yeol	Midfielder	Pohang Steelers
2014	Kim Seung-dae	Forward	Pohang Steelers
2015	Lee Jae-sung	Midfielder	Jeonbuk Hyundai Motors
2016	Ahn Hyeon-beom	Midfielder	Jeju United
2017	Kim Min-jae	Defender	Jeonbuk Hyundai Motors
2018	Han Seung-gyu	Midfielder	Ulsan Hyundai
2019	Kim Ji-hyeon	Forward	Gangwon FC
2020	Song Min-kyu	Forward	Pohang Steelers
2021	Seol Young-woo	Defender	Ulsan Hyundai
2022	Yang Hyun-jun	Midfielder	Gangwon FC
2023	Jeong Ho-yeon	Midfielder	Gwangju FC
2024	Yang Min-hyeok	Midfielder	Gangwon FC
2025	Lee Seung-won	Midfielder	Gimcheon Sangmu; Gangwon FC

=== K League 2 award ===
Season	Player	Position	Club
2020	Lee Dong-ryul	Forward	Jeju United
2021	Kim In-kyun	Midfielder	Chungnam Asan
2022	Eom Ji-sung	Midfielder	Gwangju FC
2023	An Jae-jun	Forward	Bucheon FC 1995
2024	Seo Jae-min	Midfielder	Seoul E-Land
2025	Park Seung-ho	Forward	Incheon United

== See also ==
- K League
- K League MVP Award
- K League Top Scorer Award
- K League Top Assist Provider Award
- K League Manager of the Year Award
- K League FANtastic Player
- K League Best XI
- K League Players' Player of the Year
