= Korean League Cup =

- Organiser(s): K League Federation
- Founded: 1992
- Abolished: 2012
- Region: South Korea
- Most championships: Suwon Samsung Bluewings (6 titles)

The Korean League Cup was a professional football competition in South Korean football. It was held by the K League Federation from 1986 to 2012.

== Sponsorship ==
Sponsor	Season	Competition
Regular cup
Adidas	1992–2002	Adidas Cup
Samsung Electronics	2004–2008	Samsung Hauzen Cup
Unification Church	2009	Peace Cup Korea
POSCO	2010	POSCO Cup
A&P Financial	2011	Rush & Cash Cup
Supplementary cup
LS Networks	1997	Pro-Specs Cup
Phillip Morris Korea	1998	Phillip Morris Korea Cup
Daehan Fire Insurance	1999–2000	Daehan Fire Insurance Cup

== Results ==
=== Finals ===
Edition	Season	Competition	Champions	Score	Runners-up
1	1986	Professional Football Championship	Hyundai Horang-i	Round-robin	Daewoo Royals
2	1992	Adidas Cup	Ilhwa Chunma	2–2	LG Cheetahs
2	1992	Adidas Cup	Ilhwa Chunma	2–0	LG Cheetahs
3	1993	Adidas Cup	POSCO Atoms	Round-robin	Hyundai Horang-i
4	1994	Adidas Cup	Yukong Elephants	Round-robin	LG Cheetahs
5	1995	Adidas Cup	Hyundai Horang-i	Round-robin	Ilhwa Chunma
6	1996	Adidas Cup	Bucheon Yukong	Round-robin	Pohang Atoms
7	1997	Adidas Cup	Busan Daewoo Royals	Round-robin	Jeonnam Dragons
8	1997+	Pro-Specs Cup	Busan Daewoo Royals	1–1	Pohang Steelers
8	1997+	Pro-Specs Cup	Busan Daewoo Royals	2–0	Pohang Steelers
9	1998	Adidas Korea Cup	Ulsan Hyundai Horang-i	0–0	Bucheon SK
9	1998	Adidas Korea Cup	Ulsan Hyundai Horang-i	2–1 (a.e.t.)	Bucheon SK
10	1998+	Philip Morris Korea Cup	Busan Daewoo Royals	Round-robin	Bucheon SK
11	1999+	Daehan Fire Insurance Cup	Suwon Samsung Bluewings	1–0	Busan Daewoo Royals
11	1999+	Daehan Fire Insurance Cup	Suwon Samsung Bluewings	1–1	Busan Daewoo Royals
12	1999	Adidas Cup	Suwon Samsung Bluewings	4–2	Anyang LG Cheetahs
13	2000+	Daehan Fire Insurance Cup	Bucheon SK	2–1 (a.e.t.)	Jeonnam Dragons
14	2000	Adidas Cup	Suwon Samsung Bluewings	1–0	Seongnam Ilhwa Chunma
15	2001	Adidas Cup	Suwon Samsung Bluewings	2–0	Busan I'Cons
15	2001	Adidas Cup	Suwon Samsung Bluewings	1–1	Busan I'Cons
16	2002	Adidas Cup	Seongnam Ilhwa Chunma	3–1	Ulsan Hyundai Horang-i
16	2002	Adidas Cup	Seongnam Ilhwa Chunma	1–1	Ulsan Hyundai Horang-i
17	2004	Samsung Hauzen Cup	Seongnam Ilhwa Chunma	Round-robin	Daejeon Citizen
18	2005	Samsung Hauzen Cup	Suwon Samsung Bluewings	Round-robin	Ulsan Hyundai Horang-i
19	2006	Samsung Hauzen Cup	FC Seoul	Round-robin	Seongnam Ilhwa Chunma
20	2007	Samsung Hauzen Cup	Ulsan Hyundai Horang-i	2–1	FC Seoul
21	2008	Samsung Hauzen Cup	Suwon Samsung Bluewings	2–0	Jeonnam Dragons
22	2009	Peace Cup Korea	Pohang Steelers	1–1	Busan IPark
22	2009	Peace Cup Korea	Pohang Steelers	5–1	Busan IPark
23	2010	POSCO Cup	FC Seoul	3–0	Jeonbuk Hyundai Motors
24	2011	Rush & Cash Cup	Ulsan Hyundai	3–2	Busan IPark

=== Titles by club ===
K League's principle of official statistics is that final club succeeds to predecessor club's history and records.

Club	Champions	Runners-up	Seasons won
Suwon Samsung Bluewings	6	0	1999, 1999+, 2000, 2001, 2005, 2008
Ulsan Hyundai	5	3	1986, 1995, 1998, 2007, 2011
Busan IPark	3	5	1997, 1997+, 1998+
Seongnam Ilhwa Chunma	3	3	1992, 2002, 2004
Jeju United	3	2	1994, 1996, 2000+
FC Seoul	2	4	2006, 2010
Pohang Steelers	2	2	1993, 2009

== Awards ==
=== Best Player ===
Season	Player	Club
1986	(South Korea) Choi Kang-hee	Hyundai Horang-i

=== Top goalscorer ===
Season	Player	Club	Goals	Apps	Ratio
1986	(South Korea) Ham Hyun-gi	Hyundai Horang-i	9	15	0.60
1992	(South Korea) Noh Soo-jin	Yukong Elephants	5	6	0.83
1993	(South Korea) Choi Moon-sik	POSCO Atoms	3	2	1.50
1994	(South Korea) Im Jae-sun	Hyundai Horang-i	4	6	0.67
1995	(South Korea) Kim Hyun-seok	Hyundai Horang-i	6	7	0.86
1996	(South Korea) Lee Won-shik	Bucheon Yukong	5	6	0.83
1997	(South Korea) Seo Jung-won	Anyang LG Cheetahs	8	9	0.89
1997+	(Federal Republic of Yugoslavia) Radivoje Manić	Busan Daewoo Royals	6	7	0.86
1998	(South Korea) Kim Hyun-seok	Ulsan Hyundai Horang-i	11	10	1.10
1998+	(South Korea) Kim Jong-kun	Ulsan Hyundai Horang-i	7	9	0.78
1999+	(South Korea) Kim Jong-kun	Ulsan Hyundai Horang-i	6	8	0.75
1999	(Russia) Denis Laktionov	Suwon Samsung Bluewings	3	3	1.00
2000+	(South Korea) Lee Won-shik	Bucheon SK	6	10	0.60
2000	(South Korea) Ko Jong-soo	Suwon Samsung Bluewings	2	2	1.00
2001	(South Korea) Kim Do-hoon	Jeonbuk Hyundai Motors	7	9	0.78
2002	(Federal Republic of Yugoslavia) Saša Drakulić	Seongnam Ilhwa Chunma	10	11	0.91
2004	(Brazil) Zé Carlos	Ulsan Hyundai Horang-i	7	7	1.00
2005	(Brazil) Sandro Hiroshi	Daegu FC	7	12	0.58
2006	(South Korea) Choi Sung-kuk	Ulsan Hyundai Horang-i	8	13	0.62
2007	(Brazil) Luizinho	Daegu FC	7	9	0.78
2008	(Brazil) Eninho	Daegu FC	9	8	1.13
2009	(South Korea) Yoo Chang-hyun	Pohang Steelers	4	5	0.80
2010	(Montenegro) Dejan Damjanović	FC Seoul	6	7	0.86
2011	(South Korea) Kim Shin-wook	Ulsan Hyundai	11	8	1.38

=== Top assist provider ===
Season	Player	Club	Assists	Apps	Ratio
1986	(South Korea) Chun Young-soo	Hyundai Horang-i	4	12	0.33
1992	(South Korea) Lee Kee-keun	POSCO Atoms	3	6	0.50
1993	(Argentina) Rubén Bernuncio	Daewoo Royals	2	5	0.40
1994	(South Korea) Cho Jung-hyun	Yukong Elephants	4	5	0.80
1995	(South Korea) Yoon Jong-hwan	Yukong Elephants	3	5	0.60
1996	(South Korea) Yoon Jong-hwan	Buchon Yukong	3	7	0.43
1997	(South Korea) Ko Jong-soo	Suwon Samsung Bluewings	4	8	0.50
1997+	(Russia) Oleg Yelyshev	Anyang LG Cheetahs	5	7	0.71
1998	(South Korea) Jang Chul-min	Ulsan Hyundai Horang-i	3	9	0.33
1998+	(South Korea) Yoon Jong-hwan	Bucheon SK	4	8	0.50
1999+	(South Korea) Jo Sung-hwan	Bucheon SK	4	8	0.50
1999	(Russia) Denis Laktionov	Suwon Samsung Bluewings	3	3	1.00
2000+	(South Korea) Jeon Kyung-jun	Bucheon SK	4	9	0.44
2000	(Russia) Denis Laktionov	Suwon Samsung Bluewings	4	3	1.33
2001	(Federal Republic of Yugoslavia) Radivoje Manić	Busan I'Cons	5	11	0.45
2002	(Brazil) André Gaspar	Anyang LG Cheetahs	4	9	0.44
2004	(Brazil) André Luiz Tavares	Pohang Steelers	5	11	0.45
2005	(Brazil) Paulo César	Jeonbuk Hyundai Motors	5	9	0.56
2006	(Brazil) Dudu	Seongnam Ilhwa Chunma	5	9	0.56
2007	(South Korea) Lee Chung-yong	FC Seoul	5	8	0.63
2008	(South Korea) Byun Sung-hwan	Jeju United	3	9	0.33
2009	(South Korea) Cho Chan-ho	Pohang Steelers	3	4	0.75
2010	(South Korea) Jang Nam-seok	Daegu FC	4	5	0.80
2011	(South Korea) Choi Jae-soo	Ulsan Hyundai	4	6	0.67

== See also ==
- Adidas Cup
- Korean League Cup (Supplementary Cup)
- Samsung Hauzen Cup
- K League
- National Semi-professional Football Championship (South Korea)
- Korea National League Championship
