= Zoran Milošević (Serbian footballer) =

Serbian footballer (born 1975)

Personal information
- Date of birth: November 23, 1975 (age 50)
- Place of birth: Belgrade, SFR Yugoslavia
- Height: 1.90 m (6 ft 3 in)
- Position: Defender

Youth career
- Teleoptik

Senior career*
| Years | Team | Apps | (Gls) |
| 1992–1993 | Zemun | 0 | (0) |
| 1993–1995 | Obilić | 36 | (0) |
| 1995–1996 | Balkan Mirijevo | 26 | (1) |
| 1996–1997 | Čukarički | 7 | (0) |
| 1997 | Železnik | 0 | (0) |
| 1998 | Balkan Mirijevo | 8 | (0) |
| 1998–1999 | Radnički Kragujevac | 11 | (0) |
| 2000–2002 | Jeonbuk Hyundai Motors | 50 | (0) |
| 2002–2004 | Zemun | 47 | (1) |
| 2004 | AEK Larnaca | 9 | (0) |
| 2005–2006 | CFR Cluj | 44 | (0) |
| 2007–2009 | Argeș Pitești | 30 | (0) |
| 2009–2011 | Žarkovo | | |
| Total | | 268 | (2) |
- * Club domestic league appearances and goals

Zoran Milošević (Serbian Cyrillic: Зоран Милошевић; born November 23, 1975) is a Serbian retired footballer. Milošević played 7 games in CFR Cluj's 2005 Intertoto Cup campaign in which the club reached the final.

== Honours ==
Jeonbuk Hyundai Motors

- Korean FA Cup: 2000

Argeș Pitești

- Liga II: 2007–08
