= Chun Young-soo =

South Korean footballer

Chun Young-soo 전영수
Personal information
- Full name: Chun Young-soo
- Date of birth: February 19, 1963 (age 63)
- Place of birth: South Korea
- Height: 1.78 m (5 ft 10 in)
- Position: Forward

Youth career
- 1982–1985: Sungkyunkwan University

Senior career*
Years	Team	Apps	(Gls)
1986–1988	Hyundai Horangi	10	(1)
1987–1988	→ Sangmu (military service)		
1989–1991	Yukong Elephants	21	(2)
- * Club domestic league appearances and goals

- Chun Young-soo
- Hangul: 전영수
- RR: Jeon Yeongsu
- MR: Chŏn Yŏngsu

Chun Young-soo (Korean: 전영수; born February 19, 1963, in South Korea) is a South Korean former footballer who played as a forward.

He started professional career at Ulsan Hyundai, then known as Hyundai Horangi in 1986 and he transferred to Yukong Elephants in April 1989.

He was winner of Top assists award in 1986 Professional Football Championship
