= Shin Jin-won =

South Korean footballer and coach

Personal information
- Date of birth: 27 September 1974 (age 52)
- Place of birth: South Korea
- Height: 1.76 m (5 ft 9 1/2 in)
- Position: Midfielder

Youth career
- Yonsei University

Senior career*
| Years | Team | Apps | (Gls) |
| 1997–2000 | Daejeon Citizen | 68 | (11) |
| 2001–2002 | Chunnam Dragons | 22 | (0) |
| 2003–2004 | Daejeon Citizen | 11 | (0) |
| 2007–2009 | Seoul United | | |

Managerial career
- 2005–2006: Moonil High School (Coach)
- 2006–2007: Seongji High School (Coach)
- 2008–2009: Yonsei University (Coach)
- 2010–2011: Daejeon Citizen (Coach)
- 2011: Daejeon Citizen (Cataker Manager)
- 2012: Gangwon FC (Coach)
- * Club domestic league appearances and goals as of 18 June 2011 ‡ National team caps and goals as of 18 June 2011

- Shin Jin-won
- Hangul: 신진원
- Hanja: 申晉遠
- RR: Sin Jinwon
- MR: Sin Chinwŏn

Shin Jin-won (Korean: 신진원, born 27 September 1974) is retired South Korean footballer and current coach.

== Football career ==
Shin started professional football career with Daejeon Citizen in 1997. He awarded Rookie of the Year of 1997 season.

== Honours ==
Individual

- K-League Rookie of the Year Award : 1997
- K-League Best XI : 1997
