= Cezinha =

Brazilian footballer (born 1973)

Personal information
- Full name: Cézar da Costa Oliveira
- Date of birth: 9 December 1973 (age 52)
- Place of birth: Porto Velho, Brazil
- Position: Forward

Youth career
- 1991–1992: Londrina
- 1993: Palmeiras

Senior career*
Years	Team	Apps	(Gls)
1994	América-SP		
- Ponte Preta
- União Bandeirante
1999–2002	Jeonnam Dragons	80	(29)
2003	Ituiutaba		
2004	Londrina		
2005	Ji-Paraná		
2006–2008	Ulbra Ji-Paraná		
2008–2015	Ariquemes		
2016	Real Ariquemes		
- * Club domestic league appearances and goals

Cézar da Costa Oliveira (born 9 February 1973), commonly known as Cezinha, is a Brazilian retired footballer who played as a forward. He joined Chunnam Dragons in 1999 and he was Korean FA Cup top scorer in 2000.

== Honours ==
=== Individual ===
- Korean FA Cup Top Scorer Award (1): 2000
