= Yang Hyun-jung =

South Korean footballer and coach

Yang Hyun-Jung 양현정
Personal information
- Full name: Yang Hyun-Jung
- Date of birth: 25 July 1977 (age 49)
- Place of birth: South Korea
- Height: 1.76 m (5 ft 9 1/2 in)
- Position: Midfielder

Team information
- Current team: Timor-Leste U-16 (coach)

Youth career
- Dankook University

Senior career*
Years	Team	Apps	(Gls)
2000–2003	Jeonbuk Hyundai Motors	57	(7)
2004	Icheon Sangmu (army)	2	(0)
2005	Daegu FC	1	(0)
2006	Cảng Sài Gòn		
2008	Suwon City	10	(1)

International career^{‡}
1997	South Korea U-20		
1998	South Korea	3	(0)

Managerial career
- 2007–2008: Seongnam Ilhwa Chunma U-18 (coach)
- 2009–: Timor-Leste U-16 (coach)
- * Club domestic league appearances and goals as of 18 June 2011 ‡ National team caps and goals as of 18 June 2011

- Yang Hyun-jung
- Hangul: 양현정
- Hanja: 梁鉉正
- RR: Yang Hyeonjeong
- MR: Yang Hyŏnjŏng

Yang Hyun-Jung (Korean: 양현정; born 25 July 1977) is a former South Korean football player and football coach who currently coaches Timor-Leste U-16 team.

== Football career ==
He started pro football career with Jeonbuk Hyundai Motors in 2000. Jeonbuk selected him as first order of 2000 draft and he awarded Rookie of the Year of 2000 season. In 2004, he joined Gwangju Sangmu for military duties. He mostly played for Icheon Sangmu that was reserve team of Gwangju Sangmu and played at the Korea National League. He was given hardship discharge because of cruciate ligament surgery. He played for Daegu FC for one year. He also played V-League side Cảng Sài Gòn and Korea National League side Suwon City. He quit his career because cruciate ligament injury.

== International career ==
His international career started as part of the South Korea national under-20 football team in the 1997 FIFA World Youth Championship. After his U-20 tenure, Yang was given his national team debut in the 1998 King's Cup match against Egypt. His short national team career ended only one month. Yang's national team appearance is three caps.

== Honours ==
Individual

- K-League Rookie of the Year Award : 2000
