= Yoon Hee-jun (footballer) =

South Korean footballer (born 1972)

Personal information
- Full name: Yoon Hee-jun
- Date of birth: November 1, 1972 (age 53)
- Place of birth: South Korea
- Height: 1.81 m (5 ft 11 in)
- Position: Defender

Team information
- Current team: FC Seoul (coach)

Youth career
- 2000–2003: Yonsei University

Senior career*
Years	Team	Apps	(Gls)
1995–2005	Busan IPark	167	(5)
1998–1999	→ Sangmu FC (military service)		
2006	Jeonnam Dragons	17	(0)

Managerial career
- 2017–: FC Seoul (coach)
- * Club domestic league appearances and goals

Yoon Hee-jun (Korean: 윤희준; born November 1, 1972) is a South Korean footballer.

== Career ==
He played for Busan IPark and the Jeonnam Dragons.

He has been the coach of FC Seoul coach since the 2017 season.
