= Ko Jong-soo =

South Korean footballer (born 1978)

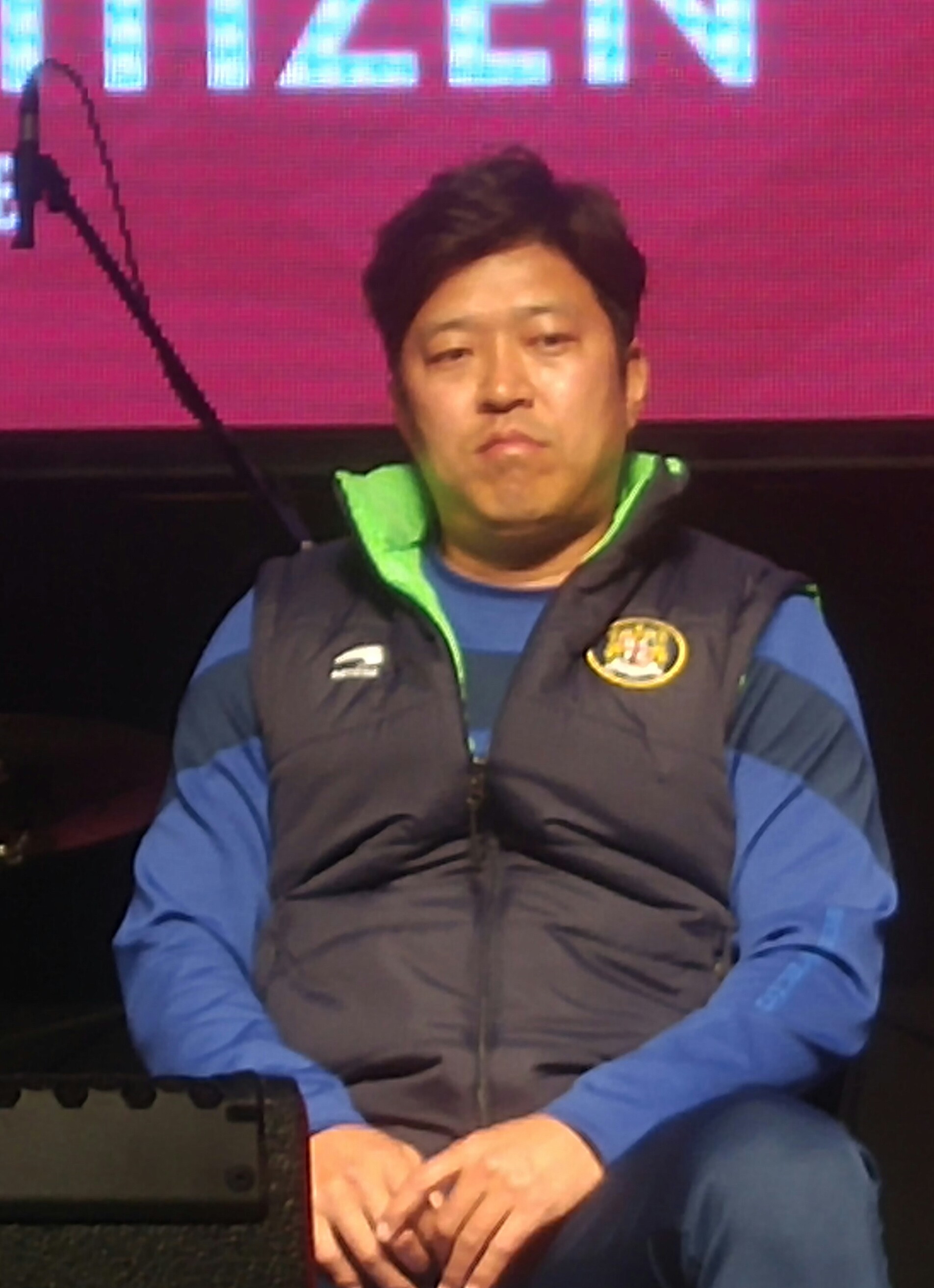
- Ko in 2018

Personal information
- Date of birth: 30 October 1978 (age 47)
- Place of birth: Yeosu, Jeonnam, South Korea
- Height: 1.76 m (5 ft 9 in)
- Position: Midfielder

Youth career
- 1993–1995: Kumho High School

Senior career*
Years	Team	Apps	(Gls)
1996–2004	Suwon Samsung Bluewings	96	(21)
2003	→ Kyoto Purple Sanga (loan)	13	(1)
2005	Jeonnam Dragons	11	(1)
2007–2008	Daejeon Citizen	24	(1)
Total		144	(24)

International career
1996–2000	South Korea U23	10 (Note: Includes one appearance considered non-international.)	(0)
1997–2001	South Korea	38	(6)

Managerial career
- 2018–2019: Daejeon Citizen
- * Club domestic league appearances and goals

- Ko Jong-soo
- Hangul: 고종수
- Hanja: 高宗秀
- RR: Go Jongsu
- MR: Ko Chongsu

Ko Jong-soo (Korean: 고종수, born 30 October 1978) is a South Korean football coach and former player.

== Early life ==
Born in Yeosu, Jeonnam, Ko graduated from Yeosu West Elementary School, Yeosu Gubong Middle School and Kumho High School.

While playing as a youth footballer for Kumho High School, Ko led his team to the title in the Baeklokgi Football Tournament, one of national high school football competitions in South Korea, and was nicknamed the "Enfant terrible". His talent received attention early from South Korea's senior professional clubs, and he joined Suwon Samsung Bluewings just before his graduation.

== Playing career ==
After joining Suwon Samsung Bluewings as a founding member in December 1995, Ko showed remarkable dribbles, passes and shots which led Suwon's prime. During his era, Suwon won 13 titles including two Asian Club Championships and two K Leagues. Especially, he was named the K League Most Valuable Player after contributing to his club's first-ever league title in 1998.

Ko was also noted for his free kicks and the front and right of the penalty arc were called "Ko Jong-soo Zones" in South Korea. He scored with a memorable free kick against José Luis Chilavert when he participated in FIFA's all-star game before the 2002 FIFA World Cup.

Ko was evaluated as the best Korean technician at the time, and his left foot is considered one of the greatest feet of all time in South Korea. He was expected to play for the national team in the 2002 World Cup, hosted by his country. However, he suffered a cruciate ligament injury in the 2001 season, and failed to recover his condition before the World Cup. This injury was also fatal to his playing career, and he could not show his former talent.

== Managerial career ==
Ko spent his coaching career in Suwon Samsung Bluewings from 2011 to 2017. In November 2017, Ko was appointed Daejeon Citizen manager by Kim Ho, the Daejeon Citizen president at the time and his manager during his playing career. However, he was convicted of corruption for improperly selecting an acquaintance's son for the team after the 2018 season. He received a suspended six-month prison sentence.

== Career statistics ==
=== Club ===
Appearances and goals by club, season and competition
Club	Season	League			National cup		League cup		Continental		Total	
Club	Season	Division	Apps	Goals	Apps	Goals	Apps	Goals	Apps	Goals	Apps	Goals
Suwon Samsung Bluewings	1996	K League	11	1	?	?	3	0	—		14	1
Suwon Samsung Bluewings	1997	K League	7	1	?	?	8	2	?	?	15	3
Suwon Samsung Bluewings	1998	K League	19	3	?	?	1	0	?	?	20	3
Suwon Samsung Bluewings	1999	K League	14	2	?	?	7	2	?	?	21	4
Suwon Samsung Bluewings	2000	K League	8	4	?	?	5	3	?	?	13	7
Suwon Samsung Bluewings	2001	K League	12	5	?	?	8	5	?	?	20	10
Suwon Samsung Bluewings	2002	K League	20	4	?	?	0	0	?	?	20	4
Suwon Samsung Bluewings	2004	K League	5	1	0	0	0	0	—		5	1
Suwon Samsung Bluewings	Total		96	21	?	?	32	12	?	?	128	33
Kyoto Purple Sanga (loan)	2003	J1 League	13	1	0	0	3	1	—		16	2
Jeonnam Dragons	2005	K League	11	1	0	0	5	1	—		16	2
Daejeon Citizen	2007	K League	11	1	1	0	0	0	—		12	1
Daejeon Citizen	2008	K League	13	0	0	0	3	1	—		16	1
Daejeon Citizen	Total		24	1	1	0	3	1	—		28	2
Career total			144	24	1	0	43	15	?	?	188	39

=== International ===
Appearances and goals by national team and year
National team	Year	Apps	Goals
South Korea	1997	10	1
South Korea	1998	16	1
South Korea	1999	4	1
South Korea	2000	3	0
South Korea	2001	5	3
Career total		38	6

Results list South Korea's goal tally first.

List of international goals scored by Ko Jong-soo
No.	Date	Venue	Opponent	Score	Result	Competition
1	25 January 1997	Sydney, Australia	New Zealand	2–1	3–1	1997 Opus Tournament
2	29 January 1998	Bangkok, Thailand	Thailand	1–0	2–0	1998 King's Cup
3	5 June 1999	Seoul, South Korea	Belgium	1–2	1–2	Friendly
4	24 January 2001	Hong Kong	Norway	1–0	2–3	2001 Lunar New Year Cup
5	27 January 2001	Hong Kong	Paraguay	1–0	1–1 (a.e.t.) (6–5 p)	2001 Lunar New Year Cup
6	11 February 2001	Dubai, United Arab Emirates	United Arab Emirates	4–1	4–1	2001 Dubai Tournament

== Honours ==
=== Player ===
Suwon Samsung Bluewings

- K League 1: 1998, 1999, 2004
- Korean FA Cup: 2002
- Korean League Cup: 1999, 1999+, 2000, 2001
- Korean Super Cup: 1999, 2000
- Asian Club Championship: 2000–01, 2001–02
- Asian Super Cup: 2001, 2002

Individual

- Korean League Cup top assist provider: 1997
- K League All-Star: 1998, 1999, 2000, 2001, 2002, 2005
- K League 1 Most Valuable Player: 1998
- K League 1 Best XI: 1998, 1999
- Korean League Cup top goalscorer: 2000
- AFC Goal of the Month: February 2001
- AFC Player of the Month: March 2001

=== Manager ===
Individual

- K League Manager of the Month: August 2018, September 2018

== Notes ==
Sporting positions
Preceded by Kang Jung-Hoon	Daejeon Citizen captain 2008	Succeeded by Kim Gil-Sik
