= Paulo César (footballer, born 1979) =

Brazilian footballer

Personal information
- Full name: Paulo César de Souza
- Date of birth: 16 February 1979 (age 47)
- Height: 1.78 m (5 ft 10 in)
- Position: Midfielder

Senior career*
| Years | Team | Apps | (Gls) |
| 2000–2001 | Internacional | 8 | (0) |
| 2002–2004 | Criciúma | 65 | (27) |
| 2005 | Jeonbuk Hyundai Motors | 3 | (0) |
| 2005–2007 | Criciúma | | |
| 2007 | → Figueirense (loan) | | |
| 2007 | Juventude | | |
| 2007 | → São Caetano (loan) | | |
| 2008–2010 | Juventude | | |
| 2011 | Esportivo | 9 | (0) |
- * Club domestic league appearances and goals

Paulo César de Souza (born 16 February 1979), known as just Paulo César, is a Brazilian former footballer.

== Career ==
He played for Jeonbuk Hyundai Motors in 2005. He was League Cup Top Assists Award winner. He played 3 matches in League and 9 matches in League Cup.

== Honours ==
=== Individual ===
- Korean League Cup Top Assists Award: 2004
