= Jang Chul-min =

South Korean footballer (born 1972)

Jang Chul-min 장철민
Personal information
- Full name: Jang Chul-min
- Date of birth: May 19, 1972 (age 54)
- Place of birth: South Korea
- Height: 1.79 m (5 ft 10 1/2 in)
- Position: Midfielder

Youth career
- 1991–1994: Pukyong National University

Senior career*
Years	Team	Apps	(Gls)
1995–1996	Jeonbuk Dainos	13	(1)
1997–2002	Ulsan Hyundai	51	(3)
- * Club domestic league appearances and goals

- Jang Chul-min
- Hangul: 장철민
- Hanja: 張鐵民
- RR: Jang Cheolmin
- MR: Chang Ch'ŏlmin

Jang Chul-min (Korean: 장철민; born May 19, 1972) is a South Korean former footballer who played as a midfielder.

He started professional career at Jeonbuk Hyundai Motors in 1995, then known as Jeonbuk Dainos and he transferred to Hyundai Horangi in 1997.

He was winner of Top assists award in 1998 Korean League Cup.
