= Ahn Seung-in =

South Korean footballer

Ahn Seung-In
Personal information
- Full name: Ahn Seung-In (안승인)
- Date of birth: March 14, 1973 (age 53)
- Place of birth: South Korea
- Position: Midfielder

Team information
- Current team: Chungju Hummel

Senior career*
Years	Team	Apps	(Gls)
1999–2004	Bucheon SK	91	(5)

Managerial career
- 2008–2011: Kwandong University (assistant)
- 2012–2014: Kwandong University
- 2015: Gangwon FC (assistant)
- 2016: Chungju Hummel
- 2017: Asan Mugunghwa (physical trainer)
- 2018–: Busan IPark (assistant)
- * Club domestic league appearances and goals as of 30 June 2007

Ahn Seung-In is a South Korean former professional footballer and former manager of Chungju Hummel. He made his debut in 1999, playing for Bucheon SK. He appeared in 117 games during his career, scored 7 goals and made 8 assists.
