= Jung Yong-hoon =

South Korean footballer (1979–2003)

Personal information
- Full name: Jung Yong-hoon
- Date of birth: 11 March 1979
- Place of birth: Seoul, South Korea
- Date of death: 31 August 2003 (aged 24)
- Place of death: Seoul, South Korea
- Height: 1.76 m (5 ft 9 in)
- Position: Midfielder

Senior career*
Years	Team	Apps	(Gls)
1998–2003	Suwon Samsung Bluewings	45	(1)
2000–2001	→ Police FC (army)		

International career^{‡}
1998–1999	South Korea U-20	9	(0)
2001	South Korea U-23		
- * Club domestic league appearances and goals as of 16 August 2008 ‡ National team caps and goals as of 16 August 2008

- Jung Yong-hoon
- Hangul: 정용훈
- Hanja: 鄭湧勳
- RR: Jeong Yonghun
- MR: Chŏng Yonghun

Jung Yong-Hoon (Korean: 정용훈; 11 March 1979 – 31 August 2003) was a South Korean footballer.

He competed at the 1998 AFC Youth Championship, where the South Korea U-20 team won for the ninth title.

He died in a car accident in Seoul on 31 August 2003.
