= Oleg Yelyshev =

Russian footballer (born 1971)

Oleg Yelyshev Олег Елышев
Personal information
- Full name: Oleg Vyacheslavovich Yelyshev
- Date of birth: 30 May 1971 (age 55)
- Place of birth: Kaliningrad, Kaliningrad Oblast, Russian SFSR
- Height: 1.81 m (5 ft 11 in)
- Positions: Midfielder; forward

Team information
- Current team: Academy FC Torpedo Moscow

Senior career*
Years	Team	Apps	(Gls)
1987–1989	Baltika Kaliningrad	43	(7)
1989–1991	Fakel Voronezh	57	(13)
1992	Dynamo Moscow	0	(0)
1992–1993	Tekstilshchik Kamyshin	57	(8)
1994–1996	Lokomotiv Moscow	80	(8)
1997–1999	Anyang LG Cheetahs	47	(11)
2000–2002	Hapoel Haifa	59	(9)
2003–2005	Fakel Voronezh	85	(17)

Managerial career
- 2006–2016: Academy FC Lokomotiv Moscow
- 2016–2018: Master-Saturn Yegoryevsk
- 2022–: Academy FC Torpedo Moscow
- * Club domestic league appearances and goals

Oleg Vyacheslavovich Yelyshev (Russian: Олег Вячеславович Елышев; born 30 May 1971) is a former Russian professional football player.

== Club career ==
He played for several clubs in Europe and Asia, including Baltika Kaliningrad and Fakel Voronezh in the Soviet First League, Dynamo Moscow, Tekstilshchik Kamyshin and Lokomotiv Moscow in the Russian Premier League and FC Seoul of the South Korean K-League, then known as Anyang LG Cheetahs. and Hapoel Haifa in the Israeli Premier League.

== Honours ==
- Korean League Cup Top Assists Award: 1997
