= Yoon Jong-hwan =

South Korean footballer and manager (born 1973)

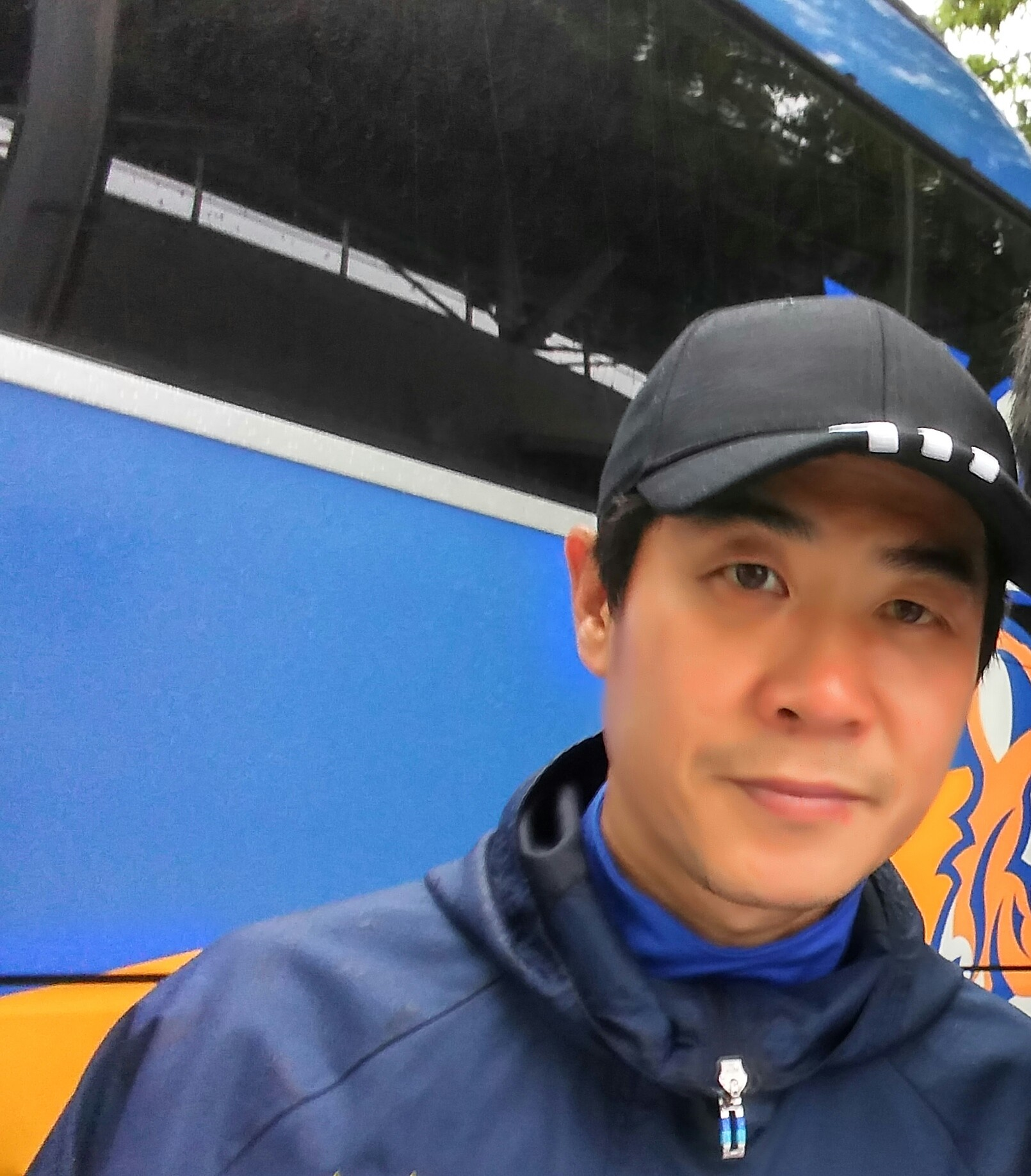
- Yoon managing Ulsan Hyundai in 2015

Personal information
- Date of birth: 16 February 1973 (age 53)
- Place of birth: Gwangju, South Korea
- Height: 1.73 m (5 ft 8 in)
- Position: Midfielder

Team information
- Current team: Incheon United (head coach)

College career
Years	Team	Apps	(Gls)
1991–1994	Dong-A University		

Senior career*
Years	Team	Apps	(Gls)
1995–1999	Bucheon SK	68	(8)
2000–2002	Cerezo Osaka	81	(9)
2003	Seongnam Ilhwa Chunma	30	(1)
2004–2005	Jeonbuk Hyundai Motors	42	(3)
2006–2007	Sagan Tosu	67	(3)
Total		288	(24)

International career
1994–1996	South Korea U23	40 (Note: Includes eleven appearances against non-national teams (ten against clubs, one against regional team), and one appearance against another KFA team.)	(4)
1994–2002	South Korea	40	(3)

Managerial career
- 2010: Sagan Tosu (assistant)
- 2011–2014: Sagan Tosu
- 2015–2016: Ulsan Hyundai
- 2017–2018: Cerezo Osaka
- 2019: Muangthong United
- 2020–2023: JEF United Chiba
- 2023–2024: Gangwon FC
- 2024–: Incheon United
Medal record
Representing South Korea
Men's football
AFC Asian Cup
Bronze medal – third place	2000 Lebanon
- * Club domestic league appearances and goals

- Yoon Jong-hwan
- Hangul: 윤정환
- Hanja: 尹晶煥
- RR: Yun Jeonghwan
- MR: Yun Chŏnghwan

Yoon Jong-hwan (born 16 February 1973) is a South Korean football manager and former player, who is currently the head coach of K League 1 club Incheon United.

== Club career ==
In 1995, Yoon started his professional career at K League club Yukong Elephants (renamed Bucheon Yukong in 1996 and Bucheon SK in 1997). Bucheon manager Valery Nepomnyashchy tried to realise Spanish-style football based on possession and short passing at the K League, where long passing and frontward movement were prevalent. Yoon was the best player at the club to execute Nepomnyashchy's tactics, and attracted attention with his passing skills. He helped the club win the 1996 Korean League Cup.

After leaving Bucheon at the end of the 1999 season, Yoon played for J.League clubs Cerezo Osaka and Sagan Tosu, as well as other K League clubs Seongnam Ilhwa Chunma and Jeonbuk Hyundai Motors. In 2008, he retired as a player.

== International career ==
Yoon was a rare playmaker in South Korea, who had exquisite passing skills and a wide span of sight. On the other hand, he had poor stamina and physique, and evaded tussle and defensive effort the national team demanded. He participated at the 1996 Summer Olympics, the 1998 Asian Games and the 2000 AFC Asian Cup, whereas he was excluded from the FIFA World Cup. He was selected for the 2002 FIFA World Cup, but did not appear in any of the seven matches.

== Manageiral career ==
=== Sagan Tosu ===
Yoon was appointed technical advisor of Sagan Tosu just after his retirement as a player in 2008. He joined the club's coaching staff in 2009, was promoted to assistant coach in 2010, and finally became their manager after getting licenses in 2011. In his first season as a manager, he finished second at the 2011 J.League Division 2, leading his team to be promoted to the Division 1.

In 2014, Sagan Tosu stood atop the J.League until Yoon's unexpected departure from them on 7 August. Their board were in conflict with Yoon about the club's future direction, and terminated the contract with him early. After Yoon left the club, they fell to fifth place at the end of the season.

=== Ulsan Hyundai ===
On 3 December 2014, Yoon was appointed manager of K League 1 club Ulsan Hyundai. Ulsan set goals to win a league title and qualify for the AFC Champions League. He finished seventh and fourth at the league in 2015 and 2016 respectively, falling short of these expectations.

=== Cerezo Osaka ===
On 6 December 2016, Yoon joined Cerezo Osaka, newly promoted to the J1 League. He achieved a domestic cup double by winning the 2017 Emperor's Cup and the 2017 J.League Cup as well as finishing third at the league. That year, he received the J1 League Manager of the Year award.

After leaving Cerezo at the end of the 2018 season, Yoon signed for Thai League 1 club Muangthong United on 9 April 2019. He resigned from his post after recording two wins, two draws and four defeats for two months at Muangthong. He returned to Japan, managing J2 League club JEF United Chiba between 2020 and 2022. In early 2023, he worked as a football commentator of South Korean television channel Sky Sports for a short period.

=== Gangwon FC ===
On 15 June 2023, Yoon moved to K League 1 club Gangwon FC, starting to replace their previous manager Choi Yong-soo. He failed to get a win in his first seven matches, but his results were gradually improved by his tactical changes. Under his guidance during the 2023 season, Gangwon succeeded in avoiding relegation, and made an expectation for the future by showing some young talents on the field. In 2024, Gangwon finished second at the league, qualifying for the AFC Champions League for the first time. Despite bringing the club's best results, he left them after a negotiation for his contract extension fell through.

=== Incheon United ===
Incheon United, who were relegated to the K League 2 at the end of the 2024 season, recruited Yoon to be promoted to the first division quickly. He won the second division title the next year, accomplishing their purpose.

== Career statistics ==
=== Club ===
Appearances and goals by club, season and competition
Club	Season	League			National cup		League cup		Other		Total	
Club	Season	Division	Apps	Goals	Apps	Goals	Apps	Goals	Apps	Goals	Apps	Goals
Bucheon SK	1995	K League	19	3	—		5	0	—		24	3
Bucheon SK	1996	K League	15	0	3	2	7	2	—		25	4
Bucheon SK	1997	K League	7	2	2	0	9	1	—		18	3
Bucheon SK	1998	K League	16	1	2	0	12	3	—		30	4
Bucheon SK	1999	K League	11	2	0	0	7	1	—		18	3
Bucheon SK	Total		68	8	7	2	40	7	—		115	17
Cerezo Osaka	2000	J1 League	29	3	3	3	3	0	—		35	6
Cerezo Osaka	2001	J1 League	26	4	5	6	1	0	—		32	10
Cerezo Osaka	2002	J2 League	26	2	3	0	—		—		29	2
Cerezo Osaka	Total		81	9	11	9	4	0	—		96	18
Seongnam Ilhwa Chunma	2003	K League	30	1	0	0	—		? (Note: Appearance(s) in AFC Champions League)	?	30	1
Jeonbuk Hyundai Motors	2004	K League	23	2	2	0	11	0	1 (Note: Appearance in K League Super Cup)	0	37	2
Jeonbuk Hyundai Motors	2005	K League	19	1	5	0	12	1	—		36	2
Jeonbuk Hyundai Motors	Total		42	3	7	0	23	1	1	0	73	4
Sagan Tosu	2006	J2 League	41	2	2	0	—		—		43	2
Sagan Tosu	2007	J2 League	26	1	0	0	—		—		26	1
Sagan Tosu	Total		67	3	2	0	—		—		69	3
Career total			288	24	27	11	67	8	1	0	383	43

=== International ===
Appearances and goals by national team and year
National team	Year	Apps	Goals
South Korea	1994	1	0
South Korea	1995	4	0
South Korea	1997	5	0
South Korea	1998	13	2
South Korea	1999	3	0
South Korea	2000	7	0
South Korea	2001	2	0
South Korea	2002	5	1
Total		40	3

Results list South Korea's goal tally first.

List of international goals scored by Yoon Jong-hwan
No.	Date	Venue	Opponent	Score	Result	Competition
1	4 December 1998	Bangkok, Thailand	Vietnam	3–0	4–0	1998 Asian Games
2	9 December 1998	Bangkok, Thailand	United Arab Emirates	1–0	2–1	1998 Asian Games
3	16 May 2002	Busan, South Korea	Scotland	3–0	4–1	Friendly

== Honours ==
=== Player ===
Bucheon Yukong

- Korean League Cup: 1996

Cerezo Osaka

- Emperor's Cup runner-up: 2001

Seongnam Ilhwa Chunma

- K League 1: 2003

Jeonbuk Hyundai Motors

- Korean FA Cup: 2005
- K League Super Cup: 2004

South Korea

- AFC Asian Cup third place: 2000

Individual

- Korean League Cup top assist provider: 1995, 1996, 1998+
- K League All-Star: 1998, 2004, 2005
- J.League All-Star: 2001

=== Manager ===
Cerezo Osaka

- J.League Cup: 2017
- Emperor's Cup: 2017
- Japanese Super Cup: 2018

Incheon United

- K League 2: 2025

Individual

- J1 League Manager of the Year: 2017
- K League Manager of the Month: May 2024, July 2024, October 2024, April 2025
- K League 1 Manager of the Year: 2024
- K League 2 Manager of the Year: 2025
- Korean FA Coach of the Year: 2024
