= Kim Hyun-soo (footballer, born March 1973) =

South Korean footballer

Kim Hyun-Soo 김현수
Personal information
- Full name: Kim Hyun-Soo
- Date of birth: March 13, 1973 (age 53)
- Place of birth: South Korea
- Height: 1.86 m (6 ft 1 in)
- Position: Defender

Youth career
- 1991–1994: Ajou University

Senior career*
Years	Team	Apps	(Gls)
1995–1999	Pusan Daewoo Royals	103	(7)
2000–2003	Seongnam Ilhwa Chunma	117	(10)
2004	Incheon United	20	(1)
2005	Chunnam Dragons	0	(0)
2006–2007	Daegu FC	41	(1)
Total		281	(19)

International career^{‡}
1994–1996	South Korea U-23	?	(?)
1997–2003	South Korea	3	(0)

Managerial career
- 2008–2012: Daegu FC U-18
- * Club domestic league appearances and goals as of 18 November 2008 ‡ National team caps and goals as of 18 November 2008

- Kim Hyun-Soo
- Hangul: 김현수
- Hanja: 金鉉洙
- RR: Gim Hyeonsu
- MR: Kim Hyŏnsu

Kim Hyun-Soo (born March 13, 1973) is a South Korean former footballer who played as a center back. He is currently the First Team coach of Daegu FC.

Kim started club career with Pusan Daewoo Royals and was part of the South Korea national football team. He played at 1998 FIFA World Cup qualification.

== Club career statistics ==
Club performance			League		Cup		League Cup		Continental		Total	
Season	Club	League	Apps	Goals	Apps	Goals	Apps	Goals	Apps	Goals	Apps	Goals
South Korea			League		KFA Cup		League Cup		Asia		Total	
1995	Pusan Daewoo Royals	K-League	25	1	-		7	0	-		32	1
1996	Pusan Daewoo Royals	K-League	27	2	?	?	2	0	-			
1997	Pusan Daewoo Royals	K-League	17	1	?	?	12	2	-			
1998	Pusan Daewoo Royals	K-League	15	2	?	?	4	0	?	?		
1999	Pusan Daewoo Royals	K-League	19	1	?	?	8	0	?	?		
2000	Seongnam Ilhwa Chunma	K-League	28	1	?	?	12	2	?	?		
2001	Seongnam Ilhwa Chunma	K-League	26	2	?	?	9	0	?	?		
2002	Seongnam Ilhwa Chunma	K-League	25	4	?	?	11	0	?	?		
2003	Seongnam Ilhwa Chunma	K-League	38	3	2	0	-		?	?		
2004	Incheon United	K-League	20	1	0	0	10	0	-		30	1
2005	Chunnam Dragons	K-League	0	0	0	0	5	0	-		5	0
2006	Daegu FC	K-League	23	1	3	1	12	0	-		38	2
2007	Daegu FC	K-League	18	0	2	0	10	1	-		30	1
Total	South Korea		281	19			102	5				
Career total			281	19			102	5				

== Honour ==
K-League Best XI : 2000, 2001, 2002, 2003
