= Park Nam-yeol =

South Korean footballer and manager (born 1970)

Personal information
- Date of birth: May 4, 1970 (age 56)
- Place of birth: South Korea
- Height: 1.78 m (5 ft 10 in)
- Position: Midfielder

Team information
- Current team: Gyeongju KHNP WFC (manager)

Youth career
- 1989–1992: Daegu University

Senior career*
Years	Team	Apps	(Gls)
1993–1996	Ilhwa Chunma	91	(14)
1997–1998	Sangmu (army)		
1999–2003	Seongnam Ilhwa Chunma	96	(15)
2004	Suwon Samsung Bluewings	0	(0)

International career
1993–1998	South Korea	19	(1)

Managerial career
- 2004–2008: Baikyang Middle School
- 2009–2012: Goyang Daekyo Noonnoppi
- 2012: South Korea (women's)
- 2014–2016: Icheon Daekyo WFC
- 2023: Cheonan City
- 2025–: Gyeongju KHNP WFC
- * Club domestic league appearances and goals

- Park Nam-yeol
- Hangul: 박남열
- Hanja: 朴南烈
- RR: Bak Namyeol
- MR: Pak Namyŏl

Park Nam-yeol (born May 4, 1970) is a South Korean former footballer who played as a midfielder. He is currently the manager of WK League side Gyeongju KHNP WFC.

== Honours ==
=== Player ===
Seongnam Ilhwa Chunma

- K League: 1993, 1994, 1995, 2001, 2002, 2003

Individual

- Korean FA Cup Most Valuable Player: 1999

=== Manager ===
Goyang Daekyo Noonnoppi

- WK League: 2011
