= Dudu (footballer, born 1980) =

Brazilian footballer

Personal information
- Full name: Eduardo Francisco da Silva Neto
- Date of birth: February 2, 1980 (age 46)
- Place of birth: Rio de Janeiro, Brazil
- Height: 1.78 m (5 ft 10 in)
- Position: Forward

Senior career*
Years	Team	Apps	(Gls)
1999–2001	Vitória	9	(3)
2002	Guarani-SP		
2002	Botafogo-SP	9	(0)
2003	Kalmar FF	22	(6)
2004	América-RJ		
2004	Cruzeiro	17	(8)
2004–2006	Seongnam Ilhwa Chunma	48	(14)
2006–2008	FC Seoul	27	(6)
2008	→ Seongnam Ilhwa Chunma (loan)	27	(16)
2009	Tombense		
2009–2010	Omiya Ardija	18	(1)
2011	→ Figueirense (loan)	10	(1)
2011	Duque de Caxias	8	(0)
2012	Boavista-RJ	5	(0)
2012	Bragantino	1	(0)
2013	Guarani-SP	5	(0)
2014–2015	Bonsucesso	3	(0)
2015	Nova Iguaçu		
- * Club domestic league appearances and goals as of 13 March 2014

Eduardo Francisco de Silva Neto (born 2 February 1980), also known as Dudu, is a Brazilian former professional footballer who played as a forward.

In 2008, he won South Korea's K-League top scorer with 15 goals.

== Honours ==
=== Individual ===
- K-League Top Scorer : 2008

=== Seongnam Ilhwa ===
- K-League: 2006
