= František Koubek =

Czech footballer (born 1969)

Personal information
- Date of birth: 6 November 1969 (age 55)
- Place of birth: Strakonice, Czechoslovakia
- Height: 1.86 m (6 ft 1 in)
- Position(s): Forward

Senior career*
Years	Team	Apps	(Gls)
1993–1995	SK Hradec Králové	12	(0)
1996–1997	FK Viktoria Žižkov	39	(1)
1997–1999	SK Hradec Králové	48	(16)
1999–2000	FK Chmel Blšany	22	(3)
2000–2001	→ Anyang LG Cheetahs (loan)	23	(7)
2002	FK Chmel Blšany	13	(2)
2003	FC Tescoma Zlín	7	(0)
- *Club domestic league appearances and goals

František Koubek (born 6 November 1969) is a retired Czech football forward. He played in the Gambrinus liga for many seasons; he also played for Anyang LG Cheetahs of the South Korean K League.
