= Jeon Woo-keun =

South Korean footballer (born 1977)

Jeon Woo-Keun
Personal information
- Date of birth: 25 February 1977 (age 49)
- Place of birth: South Korea
- Height: 1.75 m (5 ft 9 in)
- Position: Midfielder

Youth career
- 1995–1998: Incheon University

Senior career*
| Years | Team | Apps | (Gls) |
| 1999–2003 | Pusan Daewoo Royals / Busan I'Cons | 106 | (14) |
| 2004–2005 | Gwangju Sangmu (Army) | 12 | (1) |
| 2006–2008 | Busan I'Park | 25 | (2) |
| 2009 | Dalian Shide | 16 | (0) |
| 2010 | Home United | | |
| Total | | 159 | (17) |
- * Club domestic league appearances and goals as of 7 October 2009

Jeon Woo-Keun (Korean: 전우근; born 25 February 1977) is a former South Korean footballer who played as a midfielder.

His previous clubs are Busan I'Park, Gwangju Sangmu Bulsajo in the South Korean K-League, Dalian Shide in the Chinese Super League and Home United FC in Liga Primer Indonesia.
