= 1997 K League =

Rapido Cup Professional Football League
- Season: 1997
- Dates: 26 April – 25 October 1997
- Champions: Busan Daewoo Royals (4th title)
- Asian Club Championship: Busan Daewoo Royals; Pohang Steelers
- Cup Winners' Cup: Jeonnam Dragons
- Matches played: 90
- Goals scored: 232 (2.58 per match)
- Best Player: Kim Joo-sung
- Top goalscorer: Kim Hyun-seok (9 goals)

The 1997 Korean Professional Football League was the 15th season of K League. Busan Daewoo Royals won three domestic trophies including two Korean League Cups in this season.

== League table ==
Pos	Team	Pld	W	D	L	GF	GA	GD	Pts	Qualification
1	Busan Daewoo Royals (C)	18	11	4	3	24	9	+15	37	Qualification for the Asian Club Championship
2	Jeonnam Dragons	18	10	6	2	26	13	+13	36	Qualification for the Cup Winners' Cup
3	Ulsan Hyundai Horang-i	18	8	6	4	28	21	+7	30	
4	Pohang Steelers	18	8	6	4	25	22	+3	30	Qualification for the Asian Club Championship (Note: Qualified as defending champions of the Asian Club Championship.)
5	Suwon Samsung Bluewings	18	7	7	4	23	23	0	28	
6	Jeonbuk Hyundai Dinos	18	6	8	4	32	25	+7	26	
7	Daejeon Citizen	18	3	7	8	21	25	−4	16	
8	Cheonan Ilhwa Chunma	18	2	7	9	19	31	−12	13	
9	Anyang LG Cheetahs	18	1	8	9	15	27	−12	11	
10	Bucheon SK	18	2	5	11	19	36	−17	11	

Source: RSSSF
(C) Champions

== Awards ==
=== Main awards ===
Award	Winner	Club
Most Valuable Player	(South Korea) Kim Joo-sung	Busan Daewoo Royals
Top goalscorer	(South Korea) Kim Hyun-seok	Ulsan Hyundai Horang-i
Top assist provider	(Russia) Denis Laktionov	Suwon Samsung Bluewings
Rookie of the Year	(South Korea) Shin Jin-won	Daejeon Citizen
Manager of the Year	(South Korea) Lee Cha-man	Busan Daewoo Royals

=== Best XI ===
Position	Winner	Club
Goalkeeper	(South Korea) Shin Bum-chul	Busan Daewoo Royals
Defenders	(South Korea) Kim Joo-sung	Busan Daewoo Royals
Defenders	(Brazil) Maciel	Jeonnam Dragons
Defenders	(South Korea) An Ik-soo	Pohang Steelers
Midfielders	(South Korea) Kim Hyun-seok	Ulsan Hyundai Horang-i
Midfielders	(South Korea) Shin Jin-won	Daejeon Citizen
Midfielders	(South Korea) Kim In-wan	Jeonnam Dragons
Midfielders	(South Korea) Lee Jin-haeng	Suwon Samsung Bluewings
Midfielders	(South Korea) Jung Jae-kwon	Busan Daewoo Royals
Forwards	(Federal Republic of Yugoslavia) Radivoje Manić	Busan Daewoo Royals
Forwards	(Ukraine) Serhiy Skachenko	Jeonnam Dragons

== See also ==
- 1997 Korean League Cup
- 1997 Korean League Cup (Supplementary Cup)
- 1997 Korean FA Cup
