= Denis Laktionov =

Russian footballer (born 1977)

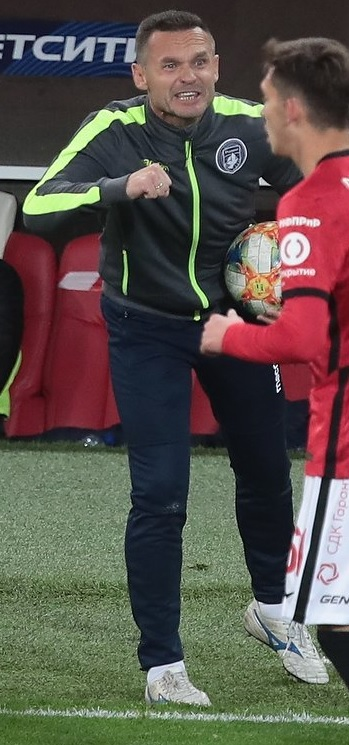
- Laktionov coaching Rodina Moscow in 2020

Personal information
- Date of birth: 4 September 1977 (age 49)
- Place of birth: Krasnozyorskoye, Soviet Union
- Height: 1.76 m (5 ft 9 in)
- Position: Midfielder

Team information
- Current team: FC 10 (manager)

Youth career
- –1994: Sakhalin

Senior career*
Years	Team	Apps	(Gls)
1994–1995	Sakhalin	59	(25)
1996–2002	Suwon Samsung Bluewings	161	(42)
2003–2005	Seongnam Ilhwa Chunma	79	(14)
2005	→ Busan I'Park (loan)	4	(0)
2006–2007	Suwon Samsung Bluewings	16	(0)
2008–2009	Sibir Novosibirsk	28	(0)
2011	Tom Tomsk	1	(0)
2012–2013	Gangwon FC	11	(1)

International career
1998–1999	Russia U21	10	(3)
2002	Russia	2	(0)

Managerial career
- 2011–2012: FC Tom Tomsk (assistant)
- 2012: FC Sibir Novosibirsk (assistant)
- 2015: UOR #5 Yegoryevsk
- 2019–2021: FC Rodina Moscow
- 2021: Riga FC
- 2022: FShM Moscow (U16)
- 2022: FC Rodina-2 Moscow
- 2023: Akritas Chlorakas (caretaker)
- 2023–2024: Akritas Chlorakas
- 2025–: FC 10
- * Club domestic league appearances and goals

- Denis Laktionov
- Hangul: 이성남
- Hanja: 李城南
- RR: I Seongnam
- MR: I Sŏngnam

Denis Vladimirovich Laktionov (Russian: Дени́с Влади́мирович Лактио́нов; born 4 September 1977) is a Russian football coach and a former player. He is the manager of Media Football League club FC 10. He became a naturalized South Korean citizen in 2003, and was known as Lee Seong-nam while playing for Seongnam Ilhwa Chunma.

== Club career ==
In December 2007 he returned to Russia and signed a two-year contract with Sibir Novosibirsk in the Russian First Division. He was released by Sibir in the summer 2008 and became a free agent. He re-signed with Sibir in the winter of 2008.

== International career ==
While not being selected for the final Russian squad, Laktionov was involved in the training camp for the 2002 FIFA World Cup. Laktionov made his debut for Russia on 17 May 2002 in a friendly game against Belarus. He also played for the Olympic team.

== Personal life ==
His cousin Aleksandr Laktionov was also a footballer. His son Nikita Laktionov made his debut as a professional footballer in 2019 at FC Rodina Moscow which Denis was managing.

== Honours ==
Suwon Samsung Bluewings

- K-League: 1998, 1999, 2003
- Korean FA Cup: 2002
- Korean League Cup: 1999, 2000, 2001, 2008
- Korean Super Cup: 1999, 2000, 2004, 2005
- Asian Club Championship: 2001, 2002
- Asian Super Cup: 2001, 2002
