= Lee Won-shik =

South Korean footballer (born 1973)

Lee Won-Shik 이원식
Personal information
- Full name: Lee Won-Shik
- Date of birth: May 16, 1973 (age 53)
- Place of birth: Daegu, South Korea
- Height: 1.72 m (5 ft 8 in)
- Position: Forward

Youth career
- Hanyang University

Senior career*
Years	Team	Apps	(Gls)
1996–2003	Bucheon SK	178	(43)
2004–2005	FC Seoul	18	(3)
2006	Daejeon Citizen	1	(0)
2010	Cheonan City	2	(0)

International career^{‡}
1995–1996	South Korea U-23	13	(2)

Managerial career
- 2007: Cheonggu High School (Coach)
- 2008–2009: Jeju United U-18
- * Club domestic league appearances and goals as of 10 October 2008 ‡ National team caps and goals as of 10 October 2008

- Lee Won-shik
- Hangul: 이원식
- Hanja: 李元植
- RR: I Wonsik
- MR: I Wŏnsik

Lee Won-Shik (born May 16, 1973) is former South Korean football player for mostly Bucheon SK in South Korea.

He was a part of the South Korea team that competed at the 1996 Summer Olympics, and has worked as a manager of the Jeju United youth academy as of 2008.

== Club career statistics ==
Club performance			League		Cup		League Cup		Continental		Total	
Season	Club	League	Apps	Goals	Apps	Goals	Apps	Goals	Apps	Goals	Apps	Goals
South Korea			League		KFA Cup		League Cup		Asia		Total	
1996	Bucheon SK	K-League	15	2	?	?	6	5	-			
1997	Bucheon SK	K-League	15	4	?	?	14	7	-			
1998	Bucheon SK	K-League	18	8	?	?	8	2	-			
1999	Bucheon SK	K-League	29	8	?	?	9	1	-			
2000	Bucheon SK	K-League	21	6	?	?	11	7	-			
2001	Bucheon SK	K-League	21	3	?	?	8	2	-			
2002	Bucheon SK	K-League	21	2	?	?	8	2	-			
2003	Bucheon SK	K-League	38	10	4	2	-		-		42	12
2004	FC Seoul	K-League	7	1	1	0	3	0	-		11	1
2005	FC Seoul	K-League	11	2	0	0	6	1	-		17	3
2006	Daejeon Citizen	K-League	1	0	0	0	0	0	-		1	0
Total	South Korea		197	46			73	27	-			
Career total			197	46			73	27				
