= 1998 Korean League Cup (Supplementary Cup) =

1998 Philip Morris Korea Cup
Tournament details
- Country: South Korea
- Dates: 10 May – 6 June 1998
- Teams: 10

Final positions
- Champions: Busan Daewoo Royals (3rd title)
- Runners-up: Bucheon SK

Tournament statistics
- Matches played: 45
- Goals scored: 125 (2.78 per match)
- Top goal scorer: Kim Jong-kun (7 goals)

The Philip Morris Korea Cup 1998 was the tenth competition of the Korean League Cup, and one of two Korean League Cups held in 1998.

== Table ==
Pos	Team	Pld	W	OW	PW	L	GF	GA	GD	Pts
1	Busan Daewoo Royals (C)	9	6	0	2	1	14	4	+10	20
2	Bucheon SK	9	4	2	0	3	17	10	+7	16
3	Anyang LG Cheetahs	9	5	0	0	4	13	9	+4	15
4	Suwon Samsung Bluewings	9	4	0	1	4	16	11	+5	13
5	Cheonan Ilhwa Chunma	9	3	0	2	4	12	14	−2	11
6	Daejeon Citizen	9	3	0	0	6	10	13	−3	9
7	Jeonbuk Hyundai Dinos	9	2	1	0	6	11	14	−3	8
8	Ulsan Hyundai Horang-i	9	2	1	0	6	14	18	−4	8
9	Pohang Steelers	9	1	2	1	5	9	16	−7	8
10	Jeonnam Dragons	9	1	0	2	6	9	16	−7	5

Source: RSSSF
(C) Champion

== Matches ==
May 10
15:00 UTC+9

Busan Daewoo Royals	1–0	Suwon Samsung Bluewings
Myung Jin-young 10'

Sokcho Stadium, Sokcho
Attendance: 10,074

May 10
15:30 UTC+9

Jeonnam Dragons	0–1 (a.e.t.)	Pohang Steelers
		Park Tae-ha 92'

Gwangyang Football Stadium, Gwangyang
Attendance: 7,163

May 10
15:00 UTC+9

Ulsan Hyundai Horang-i	3–2	Daejeon Citizen
Kim Jong-kun 42', 46'; Jang Chul-min 81'		Jung Sung-chun 23'; Gong O-kyun 36'

Ulsan Complex Stadium, Ulsan
Attendance: 6,156

May 10
15:00 UTC+9

Cheonan Ilhwa Chunma	2–2	Jeonbuk Hyundai Dinos
Rubenilson 9'; Hwang Yeon-seok 16'		Kim Yong-kab 48' (pen.); Savov 81'

Chungju Stadium, Chungju
Attendance: 22,000

May 10
15:00 UTC+9

Bucheon SK	0–2	Anyang LG Cheetahs
		Elyshev 23'; Jung Kwang-min 85'

Mokdong Stadium, Seoul
Attendance: 3,952

May 13
19:00 UTC+9

Suwon Samsung Bluewings	2–1	Pohang Steelers
Lee Ki-hyung 21', 70'		Baek Seung-chul 54'

Suwon Civil Stadium, Suwon
Attendance: 11,855

May 13
15:30 UTC+9

Ulsan Hyundai Horang-i	0–0 (a.e.t.)	Busan Daewoo Royals
Penalties
	2–3

Ulsan Complex Stadium, Ulsan
Attendance: 6,586

May 13
19:00 UTC+9

Jeonnam Dragons	0–1	Jeonbuk Hyundai Dinos
		Kim Yong-gab 90+2'

Gwangyang Football Stadium, Gwangyang
Attendance: 7,321

May 13
19:00 UTC+9

Daejeon Citizen	1–0	Bucheon SK
Jang Chul-woo 75' (pen.)

Daejeon Hanbat Stadium, Daejeon
Attendance: 2,083

May 13
19:00 UTC+9

Anyang LG Cheetahs	1–2	Cheonan Ilhwa Chunma
Park Jong-min 55'		Lee Seok-kyung 17'; Hwang Yeon-seok 71'

Anyang Stadium, Anyang
Attendance: 14,240

May 17
15:00 UTC+9

Suwon Samsung Bluewings	4–0	Ulsan Hyundai Horang-i
Jung Yong-hoon 27'; Lee Ki-hyung 57'; Park Kun-ha 64'; Yoon Sung-hyo 69'

Suwon Civil Stadium, Suwon
Attendance: 13,964

May 17
15:30 UTC+9

Pohang Steelers	2–1 (a.e.t.)	Jeonbuk Hyundai Dinos
Baek Seung-chul 80'; Jeon Kyung-joon 102'		Kim Bum-soo 18'

Steelyard Stadium, Pohang
Attendance: 7,826

May 17
15:00 UTC+9

Bucheon SK	2–2	Busan Daewoo Royals
Yoon Jung-hwan 9', 19' (pen.)		Jung Jae-kwon 50'; Ahn Jung-hwan 87' (pen.)
Penalties
	2–4

Mokdong Stadium, Seoul
Attendance: 1,778

May 17
15:00 UTC+9

Anyang LG Cheetahs	1–0	Jeonnam Dragons
Je Yong-sam 40'; Jung Kwang-min 49'

Anyang Stadium, Anyang
Attendance: 8,436

May 17
15:00 UTC+9

Cheonan Ilhwa Chunma	2–1	Daejeon Citizen
Lee Seok-kyung 36'; Rubenilson 38'		Kim Eun-jung 42'

Cheonan Stadium, Cheonan
Attendance: 12,403

May 20
15:00 UTC+9

Jeonbuk Hyundai Dinos	1–0	Suwon Samsung Bluewings
Kim Bong-hyun 46'

Jeonju Stadium, Jeonju
Attendance: 712

May 20
19:00 UTC+9

Ulsan Hyundai Horang-i	1–2 (a.e.t.)	Bucheon SK
Jung Jeong-soo 90+2'		Kwak Kyung-keun 51'; Cho Jung-hyun 93'

Ulsan Complex Stadium, Ulsan
Attendance: 5,896

May 20
19:00 UTC+9

Pohang Steelers	2–2 (a.e.t.)	Anyang LG Cheetahs
Konovalov 61'; Kim Myung-gon 90+1'		Je Yong-sam 71'; Jung Kwang-min 79'
Penalties
	4–3

Steelyard Stadium, Pohang
Attendance: 5,976

May 20
15:00 UTC+9

Cheonan Ilhwa Chunma	0–0 (a.e.t.)	Busan Daewoo Royals
Penalties
	4–3

Changwon Civil Stadium, Changwon
Attendance: 12,779

May 20
19:00 UTC+9

Jeonnam Dragons	0–1	Daejeon Citizen
		Kim Eun-jung 84'

Gwangyang Football Stadium, Gwangyang
Attendance: 6,879

May 23
19:00 UTC+9

Suwon Samsung Bluewings	0–1 (a.e.t.)	Bucheon SK
		Kwak Kyung-keun 91'

Suwon Civil Stadium, Suwon
Attendance: 13,582

May 23
15:00 UTC+9

Anyang LG Cheetahs	2–1	Jeonbuk Hyundai Dinos
Jung Kwang-min 25'; Kabongo 79'		Ha Eun-chul 77'

Anyang Stadium, Anyang
Attendance: 3,811

May 23
19:00 UTC+9

Ulsan Hyundai Horang-i	4–3 (a.e.t.)	Cheonan Ilhwa Chunma
Kim Jong-kun 28', 32' (pen.), 55'; Je Young-jin 97'		Lee Seok-kyung 46'; Rubenilson 65'; Hwang Yeon-seok 79'

Ulsan Complex Stadium, Ulsan
Attendance: 3,456

May 23
15:00 UTC+9

Daejeon Citizen	1–2	Pohang Steelers
Jang Chul-woo 36'		Choi Moon-sik 9'; Konovalov 24'

Daejeon Hanbat Stadium, Daejeon
Attendance: 1,942

May 23
15:00 UTC+9

Busan Daewoo Royals	3–1	Jeonnam Dragons
Woo Sung-moon 49'; Ahn Jung-hwan 71' (pen.); Drakulić 83'		Adão 42'

Busan Gudeok Stadium, Busan
Attendance: 5,731

May 26
19:00 UTC+9

Anyang LG Cheetahs	1–1 (a.e.t.)	Suwon Samsung Bluewings
Je Yong-sam 72'		Yoon Sung-hyo 82'
Penalties
	2–3

Anyang Stadium, Anyang
Attendance: 5,004

May 26
15:00 UTC+9

Cheonan Ilhwa Chunma	0–1	Bucheon SK
		Cho Jung-hyun 15'

Cheonan Stadium, Cheonan
Attendance: 1,845

May 26
15:00 UTC+9

Jeonbuk Hyundai Dinos	0–2	Daejeon Citizen
		Gong O-kyun 20'; Sin Jin-won 44'

Jeonju Stadium, Jeonju
Attendance: 827

May 26
19:00 UTC+9

Jeonnam Dragons	2–2 (a.e.t.)	Ulsan Hyundai Horang-i
Adão 67', 71'		Park Jung-bae 11'; Kim Hyun-seok 84'
Penalties
	4–2

Gwangyang Football Stadium, Gwangyang
Attendance: 5,845

May 26
19:00 UTC+9

Busan Daewoo Royals	3–0	Pohang Steelers
Ahn Jung-hwan 12'; Woo Sung-yong 22'; Jung Jae-kwon 61'

Busan Gudeok Stadium, Busan
Attendance: 9,217

May 30
19:00 UTC+9

Suwon Samsung Bluewings	4–1	Cheonan Ilhwa Chunma
Parakhnevych 41', 61'; Badea 50', 84'		Shin Tae-yong 71' (pen.)

Suwon Civil Stadium, Suwon
Attendance: 11,888

May 30
15:00 UTC+9

Daejeon Citizen	0–1	Anyang LG Cheetahs
		Victor 14'

Boryeong Stadium, Boryeong
Attendance: 6,217

May 30
15:00 UTC+9

Bucheon SK	4–2	Jeonnam Dragons
Kim Gi-dong 16'; Cho Jung-hyun 30'; Lee Won-shik 31'; Ivanov 90'		Adão 68', 80'

Mokdong Stadium, Seoul
Attendance: 1,480

May 30
15:00 UTC+9

Pohang Steelers	1–2	Ulsan Hyundai Horang-i
Park Tae-ha 36'		Kim Jong-kun 41', 85'

Yeongju Stadium, Yeongju
Attendance: 14,920

May 31
15:00 UTC+9

Jeonbuk Hyundai Dinos	1–2	Busan Daewoo Royals
Kim Yong-gab 11'		Drakulić 50'; Jung Jae-kwon 90+1'

Gunsan Stadium, Gunsan
Attendance: 3,824

June 2
19:00 UTC+9

Suwon Samsung Bluewings	4–2	Daejeon Citizen
Mihai 18'; Parakhnevych 41'; Shin Sung-hwan 87'; Badea 89'		Lee Ho-sung 55'; Kim Eun-jung 74'

Suwon Civil Stadium, Suwon
Attendance: 1,765

June 3
15:00 UTC+9

Cheonan Ilhwa Chunma	1–1 (a.e.t.)	Jeonnam Dragons
Kim Dong-goon 32'		Adão 13'
Penalties
	3–5

Cheonan Stadium, Cheonan
Attendance: 712

June 3
19:00 UTC+9

Busan Daewoo Royals	2–0	Anyang LG Cheetahs
Ahn Jung-hwan 43'; Jung Jae-kwon 74'

Changwon Civil Stadium, Changwon
Attendance: 13,641

June 3
19:00 UTC+9

Bucheon SK	4–0	Pohang Steelers
Cho Jung-hyun 16', 78'; Lee Won-shik 72'; Nam Ki-il 78'

Mokdong Stadium, Seoul
Attendance: 1,141

June 3
19:00 UTC+9

Ulsan Hyundai Horang-i	1–2 (a.e.t.)	Jeonbuk Hyundai Dinos
Jang Chul-min 36'		Myung Jae-yong 12' (pen.); Ha Eun-chul 118'

Ulsan Complex Stadium, Ulsan
Attendance: 4,326

June 6
15:00 UTC+9

Jeonnam Dragons	3–1	Suwon Samsung Bluewings
Roh Sang-rae 23' (pen.), 59'; Kim Sang-ho 44'		Shin Hong-gi 57' (pen.)

Gwangyang Football Stadium, Gwangyang
Attendance: 6,852

June 6
15:00 UTC+9

Daejeon Citizen	0–1	Busan Daewoo Royals
		Kim Jung-wook 31'

Daejeon Hanbat Stadium, Daejeon
Attendance: 2,141

June 6
15:00 UTC+9

Pohang Steelers	0–1	Cheonan Ilhwa Chunma
		Kim Dong-goon 76'

Steelyard Stadium, Pohang
Attendance: 7,986

June 6
15:00 UTC+9

Anyang LG Cheetahs	2–1	Ulsan Hyundai Horang-i
Elyshev 3'; Kim Jong-yeon 70'		Song Ju-seok 7'

Anyang Stadium, Anyang
Attendance: 5,412

June 6
15:00 UTC+9

Jeonbuk Hyundai Dinos	2–3	Bucheon SK
Choi Jin-cheul 3'; Park Sung-bae 51'		Kim Bong-hyun 30' (o.g.); Yoon Jung-hwan 39'; Ivanov 85'

Jeonju Stadium, Jeonju
Attendance: 1,612

== Awards ==
Award	Player	Team	Points
Top goalscorer	(South Korea) Kim Jong-kun	Ulsan Hyundai Horang-i	7 goals
Top assist provider	(South Korea) Yoon Jong-hwan	Bucheon SK	4 assists

== See also ==
- 1998 in South Korean football
- 1998 Korean League Cup
- 1998 K League
- 1998 Korean FA Cup
