= 1998 Korean League Cup =

1998 Adidas Cup
Tournament details
- Country: South Korea
- Dates: 21 March – 5 May 1998
- Teams: 10

Final positions
- Champions: Ulsan Hyundai Horang-i (3rd title)
- Runners-up: Bucheon SK

Tournament statistics
- Matches played: 44
- Goals scored: 93 (2.11 per match)
- Top goal scorer: Kim Hyun-seok (11 goals)

The Adidas Korea Cup 1998 was the ninth competition of the Korean League Cup, and one of two Korean League Cups held in 1998.

== Group stage ==
=== Group A ===
Pos	Team	Pld	W	OW	PW	L	GF	GA	GD	Pts	
1	Ulsan Hyundai Horang-i	8	2	3	0	3	12	7	+5	12	Advance to the semi-finals
2	Anyang LG Cheetahs	8	3	1	0	4	9	5	+4	11	Advance to the semi-finals
3	Suwon Samsung Bluewings	8	2	1	3	2	5	4	+1	11	
4	Daejeon Citizen	8	3	0	0	5	8	14	−6	9	
5	Busan Daewoo Royals	8	2	0	0	6	10	14	−4	6	

Source: RSSSF
March 21
15:00 UTC+9

Daejeon Citizen	1–0	Anyang LG Cheetahs
Shin Jin-won 11'

Daejeon Sports Complex
Attendance: 7,144

March 21
15:00 UTC+9

Suwon Samsung Bluewings	1–1 (a.e.t.)	Busan Daewoo Royals
Park Kun-ha 46'		Ahn Jung-hwan 59'
Penalties
	4–3

Suwon Civil Stadium
Attendance: 12,566

March 25
16:00 UTC+9

Anyang LG Cheetahs	2–0	Busan Daewoo Royals
Yelyshev 34'; Je Yong-sam 68'

Gimpo City Stadium
Attendance: 13,250

March 25
19:00 UTC+9

Suwon Samsung Bluewings	0–0 (a.e.t.)	Ulsan Hyundai Horang-i
Penalties
	5–4

Suwon Civil Stadium
Attendance: 6,103

March 28
15:00 UTC+9

Busan Daewoo Royals	0–1 (a.e.t.)	Ulsan Hyundai Horang-i
		Kim Hyun-seok 101'

Busan Gudeok stadium
Attendance: 14,217

March 28
19:00 UTC+9

Suwon Samsung Bluewings	0–0 (a.e.t.)	Daejeon Citizen
Penalties
	4–1

Suwon Civil Stadium
Attendance: 6,338

March 31
19:00 UTC+9

Suwon Samsung Bluewings	1–0	Anyang LG Cheetahs
Lee Jin-haeng 50'

Suwon Civil Stadium
Attendance: 5,881

March 31
16:00 UTC+9

Daejeon Citizen	1–4	Ulsan Hyundai Horang-i
Kim Eun-jung 79'		Kim Hyun-seok 10', 27', 82', 89'

Daejeon Sports Complex
Attendance: 4,221

April 4
15:00 UTC+9

Anyang LG Cheetahs	1–0 (a.e.t.)	Suwon Samsung Bluewings
Shaka 91'

Gumi Civil Stadium
Attendance: 23,725

April 5
15:00 UTC+9

Ulsan Hyundai Horang-i	2–0	Daejeon Citizen
Kim Hyun-seok 9', 58'

Ulsan Sports Complex
Attendance: 14,982

April 8
19:00 UTC+9

Ulsan Hyundai Horang-i	0–2	Anyang LG Cheetahs
		Je Yong-sam 29'; Jung Kwang-min 60'

Ulsan Sports Complex
Attendance: 10,956

April 8
15:00 UTC+9

Busan Daewoo Royals	3–2	Daejeon Citizen
Drakulić 22'; Esteves 25'; Ahn Jung-hwan 53'		Shin Jin-won 27'; Kim Eun-jung 86'

Namhae Stadium
Attendance: 6,134

April 11
15:00 UTC+9

Daejeon Citizen	1–4	Busan Daewoo Royals
Shin Jin-won 37'		Esteves 18'; Turković 65'; Ahn Jung-hwan 83' (pen.); Drakulić 90'

Daejeon Sports Complex
Attendance: 2,412

April 12
15:00 UTC+9

Anyang LG Cheetahs	1–2 (a.e.t.)	Ulsan Hyundai Horang-i
Kabongo 90'		Jang Cheol-min 55'; Kim Hyun-seok 91'

Anyang Stadium
Attendance: 13,725

April 18
15:00 UTC+9

Daejeon Citizen	2–1	Suwon Samsung Bluewings
Gong O-kyun 50', 73'		Badea 67'

Daejeon Sports Complex
Attendance: 1,570

April 19
15:00 UTC+9

Ulsan Hyundai Horang-i	3–2 (a.e.t.)	Busan Daewoo Royals
Jung Jung-soo 10'; Ahn Hong-min 83'; Kim Hyun-seok 110'		Woo Sung-yong 24'; Ahn Jung-hwan 77'

Ulsan Sports Complex
Attendance: 12,196

April 22
19:00 UTC+9

Busan Daewoo Royals	0–3	Anyang LG Cheetahs
		Je Yong-sam 5', 57', 65'

Busan Gudeok stadium
Attendance: 2,271

April 22
19:00 UTC+9

Ulsan Hyundai Horang-i	0–1 (a.e.t.)	Suwon Samsung Bluewings
		Jung Yong-hoon 108'

Ulsan Sports Complex
Attendance: 5,695

April 25
15:00 UTC+9

Anyang LG Cheetahs	0–1	Daejeon Citizen
		Kim Eun-jung 40'

Cheongju Stadium
Attendance: 13,128

April 25
15:00 UTC+9

Busan Daewoo Royals	0–1	Suwon Samsung Bluewings
		Kim Jae-sin 44'

Milyang Stadium
Attendance: 11,263

=== Group B ===
Pos	Team	Pld	W	OW	PW	L	GF	GA	GD	Pts	
1	Bucheon SK	8	3	2	1	2	7	7	0	14	Advance to the semi-finals
2	Pohang Steelers	8	4	0	0	4	9	7	+2	12	Advance to the semi-finals
3	Jeonnam Dragons	8	2	1	0	5	9	8	+1	8	
4	Jeonbuk Hyundai Dinos	8	1	2	1	4	10	11	−1	8	
5	Cheonan Ilhwa Chunma	8	1	1	1	5	7	9	−2	6	

Source: RSSSF
March 21
15:30 UTC+9

Pohang Steelers	2–0	Cheonan Ilhwa Chunma
Hwang Sun-hong 43' (pen.), 53'

Steelyard Stadium
Attendance: 15,157

March 21
15:30 UTC+9

Jeonnam Dragons	3–0	Bucheon SK
Kim Ki-seon 25'; Kim In-wan 50', 89'

Gwangyang Football Stadium
Attendance: 10,542

March 25
19:00 UTC+9

Pohang Steelers	0–1 (a.e.t.)	Bucheon SK
		Kwak Kyung-keun 94'

Steelyard Stadium
Attendance: 7,680

March 25
19:00 UTC+9

Jeonnam Dragons	1–2 (a.e.t.)	Jeonbuk Hyundai Dinos
Kim Ki-seon 40'		Savov 78', 112'

Gwangyang Football Stadium
Attendance: 8,124

March 28
15:00 UTC+9

Bucheon SK	0–0 (a.e.t.)	Jeonbuk Hyundai Dinos
Penalties
	4–3

Mokdong Stadium
Attendance: 4,782

March 28
15:30 UTC+9

Jeonnam Dragons	0–0 (a.e.t.)	Cheonan Ilhwa Chunma
Penalties
	3–5

Gwangyang Football Stadium
Attendance: 10,012

March 31
19:00 UTC+9

Pohang Steelers	3–1	Jeonbuk Hyundai Dinos
Choi Moon-sik 18'; Park Tae-ha 49'; Lee Dong-gook 78'		Kim Bong-hyun 4'

Steelyard Stadium
Attendance: 6,756

March 31
19:00 UTC+9

Bucheon SK	1–0	Cheonan Ilhwa Chunma
Kwak Kyung-keun 30'

Mokdong Stadium
Attendance: 1,389

April 8
19:00 UTC+9

Pohang Steelers	1–0	Jeonnam Dragons
Lee Dong-gook 61'

Steelyard Stadium
Attendance: 6,895

April 8
15:00 UTC+9

Jeonbuk Hyundai Dinos	2–1 (a.e.t.)	Cheonan Ilhwa Chunma
Kim Sung-gu 90'; Choi Jin-cheul 100'		Lee Seok-gyung 35'

Jeonju Stadium
Attendance: 1,246

April 11
15:30 UTC+9

Jeonnam Dragons	2–1 (a.e.t.)	Pohang Steelers
Yang Dong-yeon 90'; Roh Sang-rae 100'		Lee Dong-gook 47'

Gwangyang Football Stadium
Attendance: 10,062

April 11
15:00 UTC+9

Cheonan Ilhwa Chunma	3–0	Jeonbuk Hyundai Dinos
Rubenilson 51', 58'; Yoo In 70'

Cheonan Stadium
Attendance: 2,013

April 15
15:00 UTC+9

Jeonbuk Hyundai Dinos	1–1 (a.e.t.)	Pohang Steelers
Parakhnevych 10'		Obeid 77'
Penalties
	4–2

Jeonju Stadium
Attendance: 526

April 15
15:00 UTC+9

Cheonan Ilhwa Chunma	1–2 (a.e.t.)	Bucheon SK
Shin Tae-yong 33'		Kang Chul 24'; Kwak Kyung-keun 91'

Cheonan Stadium
Attendance: 1,672

April 18
15:00 UTC+9

Cheonan Ilhwa Chunma	2–1 (a.e.t.)	Jeonnam Dragons
Cho Woo-seok 80'; Rubenilson 107'		Kim In-wan 67'

Changwon Civil Stadium
Attendance: 9,381

April 19
15:00 UTC+9

Jeonbuk Hyundai Dinos	3–0	Bucheon SK
Park Sung-bae 28'; Byeon Jae-seop 38'; Jeon Hyun-seok 88'

Jeonju Stadium
Attendance: 1,520

April 22
19:00 UTC+9

Bucheon SK	2–0	Pohang Steelers
Jo Jung-hyun 82'; Kwak Kyung-keun 84'

Mokdong Stadium
Attendance: 1,686

April 22
15:00 UTC+9

Jeonbuk Hyundai Dinos	1–2	Jeonnam Dragons
Jeon Hyun-seok 81' (pen.)		Kim In-wan 26'; Roh Sang-rae 45' (pen.)

Jeonju Stadium
Attendance: 628

April 25
15:00 UTC+9

Cheonan Ilhwa Chunma	0–1	Pohang Steelers
		Lee Dong-gook 87'

Cheonan Stadium
Attendance: 4,728

April 25
15:00 UTC+9

Bucheon SK	1–0	Jeonnam Dragons
Yoon Jung-chun 86'

Mokdong Stadium
Attendance: 2,158

== Knockout stage ==
=== Bracket ===
Semi-finals
A1	Ulsan Hyundai Horang-i	2
B2	Pohang Steelers	1
B1	Bucheon SK	1
A2	Anyang LG Cheetahs	0

Final
Ulsan Hyundai Horang-i (a.e.t.)	0	2	2
Bucheon SK	0	1	1

=== Semi-finals ===
April 29
19:00 UTC+9

Ulsan Hyundai Horang-i	2–1	Pohang Steelers
Kim Hyun-seok 44'; Park Jung-bae 90'		Sabitović 64'

Ulsan Sports Complex
Attendance: 21,965

April 29
19:00 UTC+9

Bucheon SK	1–0	Anyang LG Cheetahs
Jo Jung-hyun 41'

Mokdong Stadium
Attendance: 3,924

=== Final ===
May 2
15:00 UTC+9

Ulsan Hyundai Horang-i	0–0	Bucheon SK

Ulsan Sports Complex
Attendance: 12,345

May 5
15:00 UTC+9

Bucheon SK	1–2 (a.e.t.)	Ulsan Hyundai Horang-i
Kang Chul 74'		Yoo Sang-chul 14'; Kim Hyun-seok 110'

Dongdaemun Stadium
Attendance: 28,756

== Awards ==
Award	Player	Team	Points
Top goalscorer	(South Korea) Kim Hyun-seok	Ulsan Hyundai Horang-i	11 goals
Top assist provider	(South Korea) Jang Chul-min	Ulsan Hyundai Horang-i	3 assists

== See also ==
- 1998 in South Korean football
- 1998 Korean League Cup (Supplementary Cup)
- 1998 K League
- 1998 Korean FA Cup
