= 1998 Korean FA Cup =

1998 Sambo Change Up FA Cup

Tournament details
- Country: South Korea
- Teams: 20

Final positions
- Champions: Anyang LG Cheetahs (1st title)
- Runners-up: Ulsan Hyundai Horang-i

Tournament statistics
- Matches played: 19
- Goals scored: 56 (2.95 per match)
- Top goal scorer: Kim Jong-kun (5 goals)

Awards
- Best player: Kang Chun-ho

The 1998 Korean FA Cup, known as the 1998 Sambo Change Up FA Cup, was the third edition of the Korean FA Cup.

== Bracket ==
Round of 16
Anyang LG Cheetahs (a.e.t.)	2
Sangmu FC	1
Busan Daewoo Royals (a.e.t.)	3
Daejeon Citizen	2
Jeonnam Dragons	1
Dankook University	0
Bucheon SK	0
Dongguk University (a.e.t.)	1
Cheonan Ilhwa Chunma	4
Hallelujah FC	1
Ulsan Hyundai Horang-i	2
Konkuk University	1
Pohang Steelers (p)	1 (4)
Korean Police	1 (2)
Jeonbuk Hyundai Dinos	0
Suwon Samsung Bluewings	1

Quarter-finals
Anyang LG Cheetahs (a.e.t.)	2
Busan Daewoo Royals	1
Jeonnam Dragons	5
Dongguk University	0
Cheonan Ilhwa Chunma	1 (3)
Ulsan Hyundai Horang-i (p)	1 (4)
Pohang Steelers	2
Suwon Samsung Bluewings	0

Semi-finals
Anyang LG Cheetahs	1
Jeonnam Dragons	0
Ulsan Hyundai Horang-i (a.e.t.)	2
Pohang Steelers	1

Final
Anyang LG Cheetahs	2
Ulsan Hyundai Horang-i	1

== First round ==
November 15	Bucheon SK	5–1	Korea Housing Bank	Seoul Mokdong Stadium
	Ivanov 32', 37', 45', 85'; Hwang In-sung 90'		Choi Tae-ho 9'

November 15	Suwon Samsung Bluewings	2–2 (a.e.t.) (4–2 p)	Korea University	Suwon Civil Stadium
	Drăguş 6', 43'		Park Min-seo 14'; Son Dong-hyun 57'

November 15	Daejeon Citizen	1–0	Yonsei University	Daejeon Hanbat Stadium
	Kim Seung-han 72'

November 15	Ulsan Hyundai Horang-i	3–2	Hanil Bank	Ulsan Complex Stadium
	Kim Jong-kun 23', 32'; Jung Jeong-soo 67'		Jeong Young-hyun 11'; Keum Deok-yong 53'

== Round of 16 ==
November 17	Cheonan Ilhwa Chunma	4–1	Hallelujah FC	Cheonan Oryong Stadium
	Jang Dae-il 29', 36'; Lee Seok-kyung 75'; Hwang Yeon-seok 90'		Jeong Dong-yeon 61'

November 17	Anyang LG Cheetahs	2–1 (a.e.t.)	Sangmu FC	Anyang Stadium
	Baek Hyung-jin 76', 98'		Cho Jin-ho 52'

November 17	Jeonnam Dragons	1–0	Dankook University	Cheonan Oryong Stadium
	Kim Ki-seon 64'

November 17	Pohang Steelers	1–1 (a.e.t.) (4–2 p)	Korean Police	Pohang Steelyard Stadium
	Kang Geum-cheol 29'		Baek Seung-chul 88'

November 18	Jeonbuk Hyundai Dinos	0–1	Suwon Samsung Bluewings	Jeonju Stadium
			Parakhnevych 15'

November 18	Busan Daewoo Royals	3–2 (a.e.t.)	Daejeon Citizen	Miryang Stadium
	Myung Jin-young 58', 103'; Lee Yong-ha 84'		Choi Dong-pil 44'; Kim Seung-han 74'

November 18	Bucheon SK	0–1 (a.e.t.)	Dongguk University	Seoul Mokdong Stadium
			Song Chan-ho 104'

November 18	Ulsan Hyundai Horang-i	2–1	Konkuk University	Ulsan Complex Stadium
	Kim Jong-kun 67'; Jang Hyung-seok 71'		Hyun Young-min 36'

== Quarter-finals ==
November 21	Anyang LG Cheetahs	2–1 (a.e.t.)	Busan Daewoo Royals	Anyang Stadium
	Jung Kwang-min 30'; Kang Chun-ho 118'		Kim Jae-young 23'

November 21	Cheonan Ilhwa Chunma	1–1 (a.e.t.) (3–4 p)	Ulsan Hyundai Horang-i	Cheonan Oryong Stadium
	Jang Dae-il 70'		Jung Jeong-soo 72'

November 21	Jeonnam Dragons	5–0	Dongguk University	Gwangyang Stadium
	Roh Sang-rae 27'; Kim Do-keun 41', 84'; Yoon Geun-ho 50' (o.g.); Kim In-wan 53'

November 21	Pohang Steelers	2–0	Suwon Samsung Bluewings	Pohang Steelyard Stadium
	Baek Seung-cheol 22', 40'

== Semi-finals ==
November 23	Anyang LG Cheetahs	1–0	Jeonnam Dragons	Seoul Dongdaemun Stadium
	Jung Kwang-min 49'

November 23	Ulsan Hyundai Horang-i	2–1 (a.e.t.)	Pohang Steelers	Seoul Dongdaemun Stadium
	Kim Jong-kun 82'; Seo Dong-won 99'		Kim Myung-gon 74'

== Final ==
November 25	Anyang LG Cheetahs	2–1	Ulsan Hyundai Horang-i	Seoul Dongdaemun Stadium
	Je Yong-sam 65', 86'		Kim Jong-kun 17'

== Awards ==
Award	Winner	Team
Most Valuable Player	(South Korea) Kang Chun-ho	Anyang LG Cheetahs
Top goalscorer	(South Korea) Kim Jong-kun	Ulsan Hyundai Horang-i

== See also ==
- 1998 in South Korean football
- 1998 K League
- 1998 Korean League Cup
- 1998 Korean League Cup (Supplementary Cup)
