= 1995 Korean League Cup =

1995 Adidas Cup
Tournament details
- Country: South Korea
- Dates: 25 March – 22 April 1995
- Teams: 8

Final positions
- Champions: Hyundai Horang-i (1st title)
- Runners-up: Ilhwa Chunma

Tournament statistics
- Matches played: 28
- Goals scored: 63 (2.25 per match)
- Top goal scorer: Kim Hyun-seok (6 goals)

The 1995 Korean League Cup, also known as the Adidas Cup 1995, was the fifth competition of the Korean League Cup.

== Table ==
Pos	Team	Pld	W	D	L	GF	GA	GD	Pts
1	Hyundai Horang-i (C)	7	5	2	0	14	5	+9	17
2	Ilhwa Chunma	7	3	4	0	7	4	+3	13
3	Daewoo Royals	7	2	3	2	9	8	+1	9
4	Jeonbuk Hyundai Dinos	7	2	2	3	8	6	+2	8
5	Yukong Elephants	7	2	2	3	9	11	−2	8
6	LG Cheetahs	7	1	3	3	6	9	−3	6
7	Pohang Atoms	7	1	3	3	4	7	−3	6
8	Jeonnam Dragons	7	1	3	3	6	13	−7	6

Source: RSSSF
(C) Champions

== Matches ==
March 25
15:00 UTC+9

Yukong Elephants	0–3	LG Cheetahs
		Choi Yong-soo 34', 56'; Son Jong-chan 38' (o.g.)

Jeju Stadium
Attendance: 9,850

March 25
15:00 UTC+9

Daewoo Royals	0–1	Ilhwa Chunma
		Kim Dong-keon 72'

Busan Gudeok stadium
Attendance: 15,700

March 25
15:00 UTC+9

Hyundai Horang-i	2–1	Pohang Atoms
Kim Hyun-seok 42', 75' (pen.)		Bogdanović 13'

Ulsan Sports Complex
Attendance: 13,000

March 25
15:00 UTC+9

Jeonnam Dragons	0–3	Jeonbuk Hyundai Dinos
		Kim Do-hoon 21' (pen.); Kim Beom-su 45'; Choi Jin-gyu 55' (pen.)

Gwang-Yang Stadium
Attendance: 15,000

April 1
15:00 UTC+9

LG Cheetahs	0–2	Daewoo Royals
		Ha Seok-ju 26'; No Kyung-hwan 63'

Gumi Civil Stadium
Attendance: 30,000

April 1
15:00 UTC+9

Ilhwa Chunma	0–0	Hyundai Horang-i

Donghae Stadium
Attendance: 25,000

April 1
15:30 UTC+9

Pohang Atoms	1–3	Jeonnam Dragons
Choi Moon-sik 27'		Kim Bong-gil 49' (pen.); Roh Sang-rae 78'

Steelyard Stadium
Attendance: 21,000

April 1
15:00 UTC+9

Jeonbuk Hyundai Dinos	2–0	Yukong Elephants
Kim Do-hoon 61', 75'

Jeonju Stadium
Attendance: 25,124

April 5
15:30 UTC+9

Jeonnam Dragons	0–0	Ilhwa Chunma

Gwang-Yang Stadium
Attendance: 13,000

April 5
15:30 UTC+9

Pohang Atoms	1–2	Yukong Elephants
Bae Chang-geun 75'		Jo Jung-hyun 17'; Lee Kwang-jong 51'

Steelyard Stadium
Attendance: 13,500

April 5
15:00 UTC+9

Daewoo Royals	1–0	Jeonbuk Hyundai Dinos
An Seong-il 23'

Busan Gudeok stadium
Attendance: 15,000

April 5
15:00 UTC+9

LG Cheetahs	1–4	Hyundai Horang-i
Lee Jung-ho 22'		Kim Hyun-seok 50', 64'; Song Ju-seok 53'; Yoo Sang-cheol 74'

Suwon Civil Stadium
Attendance: 20,000

April 8
16:00 UTC+9

Daewoo Royals	0–0	Pohang Atoms

Busan Gudeok stadium
Attendance: 11,000

April 8
15:00 UTC+9

Jeonbuk Hyundai Dinos	0–0	Hyundai Horang-i

Iksan Stadium
Attendance: 20,000

April 8
15:30 UTC+9

Jeonnam Dragons	0–0	LG Cheetahs

Gwang-Yang Stadium
Attendance: 12,000

April 8
15:00 UTC+9

Yukong Elephants	1–1	Ilhwa Chunma
Hwangbo Kwan 74'		Ko Jeong-woon 76'

Mokpo Stadium
Attendance: 18,000

April 15
15:00 UTC+9

Hyundai Horang-i	2–0	Yukong Elephants
Kim Jong-keon 55'; Kim Hyun-seok 71'

Gyeongju Stadium
Attendance: 15,000

April 15
15:30 UTC+9

Jeonnam Dragons	2–2	Daewoo Royals
Kim Bong-gil 45' (pen.); Kim In-wan 54'		Drakulić 9'; Ahn Seong-il 41'

Gwang-Yang Stadium
Attendance: 10,517

April 15
15:00 UTC+9

LG Cheetahs	1–2	Ilhwa Chunma
Kim Dong-hae 31'		Kim Dong-gun 2'; Hwang Yeon-seok 41'

Changwon Civil Stadium
Attendance: 25,000

April 15
15:30 UTC+9

Pohang Atoms	1–0	Jeonbuk Hyundai Dinos
Bogdanović 26'

Steelyard Stadium
Attendance: 6,000

April 19
19:00 UTC+9

Hyundai Horang-i	3–2	Daewoo Royals
Song Ju-seok 22', 64'; Kim Jong-sik 55'		Ha Seok-ju 74', 77'

Ulsan Sports Complex
Attendance: 10,000

April 19
15:00 UTC+9

Jeonbuk Hyundai Dinos	1–1	LG Cheetahs
Kim Gyeong-rae 84'		Kim Sang-hun 32'

Iksan Stadium
Attendance: 2,200

April 19
16:00 UTC+9

Yukong Elephants	4–0	Jeonnam Dragons
Hwangbo Kwan 11', 50'; Somogyi 37'; Attila 90'

Pyeongtaek Stadium
Attendance: 1,000

April 19
15:00 UTC+9

Ilhwa Chunma	0–0	Pohang Atoms

Mokdong Stadium
Attendance: 9,952

April 22
16:00 UTC+9

Daewoo Royals	2–2	Yukong Elephants
Kim Joo-sung 19' (pen.); Ha Seok-ju 85'		Lee Seok-gyeong 13', 64'

Busan Gudeok stadium
Attendance: 2,500

April 22
15:30 UTC+9

Pohang Atoms	0–0	LG Cheetahs

Steelyard Stadium
Attendance: 8,100

April 22
15:30 UTC+9

Ilhwa Chunma	3–2	Jeonbuk Hyundai Dinos
Hwang Yeon-seok 5', 89'; Lee Jong-hwa 83'		Kim Beom-su 19'; Baek Song 36'

Pyeongtaek Stadium
Attendance: 3,500

April 22
15:00 UTC+9

Hyundai Horang-i	3–1	Jeonnam Dragons
Kim Hyun-seok 20' (pen.); Song Ju-seok 22', 36'		Oh Gyeong-seok 50'

Ulsan Sports Complex
Attendance: 12,000

== Awards ==
Award	Player	Team	Points
Top goalscorer	(South Korea) Kim Hyun-seok	Hyundai Horang-i	6 goals
Top assist provider	(South Korea) Yoon Jong-hwan	Yukong Elephants	3 assists

== See also ==
- 1995 K League
