= Kim Byung-ji =

South Korean footballer (born 1970)

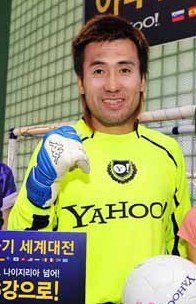
- Kim in 2010

Personal information
- Full name: Kim Byung-ji
- Date of birth: 8 April 1970 (age 56)
- Place of birth: Miryang, Gyeongnam, South Korea
- Height: 1.84 m (6 ft 1/2 in)
- Position: Goalkeeper

Youth career
- 1983–1985: Milyang Middle School
- 1986–1988: Aloysius Technical High School

Senior career*
Years	Team	Apps	(Gls)
1990–1992	Sangmu FC (draft)		
1992–2000	Ulsan Hyundai Horang-i	179	(2)
2001–2005	Pohang Steelers	137	(0)
2006–2008	FC Seoul	58	(0)
2009–2012	Gyeongnam FC	122	(0)
2013–2015	Jeonnam Dragons	101	(0)
Total		597	(2)

International career
1995–2008	South Korea	61	(0)
- * Club domestic league appearances and goals

- Kim Byung-ji
- Hangul: 김병지
- Hanja: 金秉址
- RR: Gim Byeongji
- MR: Kim Pyŏngji

Kim Byung-ji (Korean: 김병지; born 8 April 1970) is a South Korean football administrator and former player. He played as a goalkeeper for the South Korea national team at the 1998 FIFA World Cup (and also a member at the 2002 tournament). He is currently the director of K League 1 club Gangwon FC and a vice-president of the Korea Football Association.

== Playing career ==
Kim spent 24 seasons as a professional player from 1992 to 2015. He kept 229 clean sheets and scored three goals while playing a record 706 games in the K League and Korean League Cup.

Kim was selected for the South Korean squad for the 1998 FIFA World Cup. South Korea lost 5–0 to the Netherlands in its second match, and South Korean players couldn't avoid journalists' criticisms after the defeat. Furthermore, South Korea's manager Cha Bum-kun was sacked, although the tournament was ongoing. However, Kim struggled in the Netherlands' 17 shots on target, and became the only player to receive acclaim despite conceding five goals.

== Style of play ==
Kim was a sweeper-keeper who could show clearances outside the penalty area at a rapid pace. He also had great reflexes, and was skilled in making super saves. However, his excessively active personality sometimes resulted in eccentric plays. In a match of the 2001 Lunar New Year Cup against Paraguay, he was deprived of the ball after he suddenly tried to dribble, and embarrassed Guus Hiddink, the former South Korea's manager. Kim formed a strong rivalry with Lee Woon-jae in the K League and the national team, and also competed with him for the position as a starter in the 2002 FIFA World Cup. Hiddink agonised over the choice of a goalkeeper until the start of the tournament, but selected Lee because of Kim's eccentric play in the Lunar New Year Cup.

== After retirement ==
Kim is currently working as a YouTuber in the "Kkong-byung-ji-tv", his YouTube channel, after his retirement in 2015.

On 27 January 2021, Kim was appointed a vice-president of the Korea Football Association (KFA).

On 28 May 2022, Kim signed with entertainment company Angry Dogs.

Kim became the president of Gangwon FC on 15 December 2022, and he resigned from KFA the next month to concentrate on Gangwon.

On 20 October 2024, he played as a goalkeeper for Team Spear at the Nexon Icons Match, which invited retired legendary players.

On 9 April 2025, Kim was once again appointed vice-president of the KFA by president Chung Mong-gyu, returning to the association.

== Career statistics ==
=== Club ===
Appearances and goals by club, season and competition
Club	Season	League			National cup		League cup		Continental		Total	
Club	Season	Division	Apps	Goals	Apps	Goals	Apps	Goals	Apps	Goals	Apps	Goals
Sangmu FC (draft)	1990	National Semipro League	?	?	? (Note: Appearance(s) in Korean National Championship)	?	—		—		?	?
Sangmu FC (draft)	1991	National Semipro League	?	?	?	?	?	?	—		?	?
Sangmu FC (draft)	1992	National Semipro League	?	?	?	?	?	?	—		?	?
Sangmu FC (draft)	Total		?	?	?	?	?	?	—		?	?
Ulsan Hyundai Horang-i	1992	K League	6	0	—		4	0	—		10	0
Ulsan Hyundai Horang-i	1993	K League	21	0	—		4	0	—		25	0
Ulsan Hyundai Horang-i	1994	K League	24	0	—		3	0	—		27	0
Ulsan Hyundai Horang-i	1995	K League	28	0	—		7	0	—		35	0
Ulsan Hyundai Horang-i	1996	K League	27	0	0	0	5	0	? (Note: Appearance(s) in Asian Club Championship)	?	30	0
Ulsan Hyundai Horang-i	1997	K League	13	0	2	0	7	0	?	?	22	0
Ulsan Hyundai Horang-i	1998	K League	22	1	0	0	3	0	?	?	25	1
Ulsan Hyundai Horang-i	1999	K League	12	0	3	0	8	0	—		23	0
Ulsan Hyundai Horang-i	2000	K League	26	1	2	0	5	1	—		33	2
Ulsan Hyundai Horang-i	Total		179	2	7	0	46	1	?	?	232	3
Pohang Steelers	2001	K League	22	0	4	0	3	0	—		29	0
Pohang Steelers	2002	K League	21	0	4	0	0	0	—		25	0
Pohang Steelers	2003	K League	43	0	0	0	—		—		43	0
Pohang Steelers	2004	K League	27	0	0	0	12	0	—		39	0
Pohang Steelers	2005	K League	24	0	3	0	12	0	—		39	0
Pohang Steelers	Total		137	0	11	0	27	0	—		175	0
FC Seoul	2006	K League	27	0	3	0	13	0	—		43	0
FC Seoul	2007	K League	26	0	3	0	12	0	—		41	0
FC Seoul	2008	K League	5	0	1	0	1	0	—		7	0
FC Seoul	Total		58	0	7	0	26	0	—		91	0
Gyeongnam FC	2009	K League	26	0	2	0	3	0	—		31	0
Gyeongnam FC	2010	K League	29	0	2	0	6	0	—		37	0
Gyeongnam FC	2011	K League	30	0	0	0	3	0	—		33	0
Gyeongnam FC	2012	K League	37	0	4	0	—		—		41	0
Gyeongnam FC	Total		122	0	8	0	12	0	—		142	0
Jeonnam Dragons	2013	K League 1	36	0	0	0	—		—		36	0
Jeonnam Dragons	2014	K League 1	38	0	1	0	—		—		38	0
Jeonnam Dragons	2015	K League 1	27	0	4	0	—		—		27	0
Jeonnam Dragons	Total		101	0	5	0	0	0	—		106	0
Career total			597	2	38	0	111	1	?	?	746	3

=== International ===
Appearances and goals by national team and year
National team	Year	Apps	Goals
South Korea	1995	4	0
South Korea	1996	13	0
South Korea	1997	10	0
South Korea	1998	16	0
South Korea	1999	3	0
South Korea	2000	4	0
South Korea	2001	2	0
South Korea	2002	8	0
South Korea	2008	1	0
Career total		61	0

== Filmography ==
=== Television ===
Year	Title	Role	Note(s)	Ref.
2021	Vincenzo	Youth football team coach		
2021–present	Kick a Goal	Himself		
2022	Steel Ball	Himself (host)		

== Honours ==
=== Player ===
Sangmu FC

- Korean National Semipro League (Spring): 1992
- Korean National Semipro League (Autumn): 1991

Ulsan Hyundai Horang-i

- K League 1: 1996
- Korean FA Cup runner-up: 1998
- Korean League Cup: 1995, 1998

Pohang Steelers

- Korean FA Cup runner-up: 2001, 2002

FC Seoul

- Korean League Cup: 2006

Individual

- Korean National Semipro League (Autumn) Best Player: 1991
- K League All-Star: 1995, 1997, 1998, 1999, 2000, 2001, 2002, 2003, 2004, 2005, 2006, 2007, 2013, 2015
- K League 1 Best XI: 1996, 1998, 2005, 2007
- K League All-Star Game Most Valuable Player: 2000
- K League Hall of Fame: 2025

Records

- K League all-time appearance leader: 708 appearances
- K League all-time clean sheet leader: 229 clean sheets

=== Television personality ===
List of awards and nominations received by TV personality Kim Byung-ji
Award ceremony	Year	Category	Nominated work	Result	Ref.
SBS Entertainment Awards	2022	Leader of the Year Award (Note: Shared with Ha Seok-ju, Kim Tae-young, Choi Jin-cheul, Choi Sung-yong, Lee Eul-yong, Hyun Young-min, Lee Young-pyo, Oh Beom-seok, Cho Jae-jin and Baek Ji-hoon)	Kick a Goal	Won	
