= K League records and statistics =

This article shows the K League records and statistics based on the K League Data Portal. The K League officially includes K League 1, K League 2, K League Championship and Korean League Cup records in its statistics regardless of competition levels and formats.

Players in bold are still playing in K League.

== Record holders ==
As of 4 December 2025

Category	Record holder	Record
Appearances	(South Korea) Kim Byung-ji	708
Goals	(South Korea) Lee Dong-gook	228
Assists	(South Korea) Yeom Ki-hun	110
Clean sheets	(South Korea) Kim Byung-ji	229
Longest goal	(South Korea) Kwon Jung-hyuk	85 m
Fastest goal	(South Korea) Bang Seung-hwan	00:11
Fastest assist	(South Korea) Lee Jae-sung	00:18

== Most appearances ==
As of 4 December 2025

Rank	Player	Career	Overall	K League 1
1	(South Korea) Kim Byung-ji	1992–2015	708	586
2	(South Korea) Kim Young-kwang	2002–2023	605	352
3	(South Korea) Lee Dong-gook	1998–2020	548	506
4	(South Korea) Choi Eun-sung	1997–2014	532	419
5	(South Korea) Kim Gi-dong	1993–2011	501	367
6	(South Korea) **Shin Kwang-hoon**	2006–present	500	433
7	(South Korea) Kim Yong-dae	2002–2018	460	418
8	(South Korea) Kim Sang-sik	1999–2013	458	365
9	(South Korea) Choi Chul-soon	2006–2025	457	388
10	(South Korea) Kang Min-soo	2004–2023	456	389

== Top goalscorers ==
As of 4 December 2025

Rank	Player	Overall	Apps	Ratio	K League 1
1	(South Korea) Lee Dong-gook	228	548	0.42	213
2	(Montenegro) Dejan Damjanović	198	380	0.52	184
3	(South Korea) **Joo Min-kyu**	158	393	0.4	106
4	(South Korea) Kim Shin-wook	132	350	0.38	116
5	(South Korea) Kim Eun-jung	123	444	0.28	92
6	(South Korea) Jung Jo-gook	121	392	0.31	87
7	(South Korea) Woo Sung-yong	116	439	0.26	93
8	(South Korea) Kim Do-hoon	114	257	0.44	85
8	(Brazil) **Cesinha**	114	289	0.39	100
10	(South Korea) Kim Hyun-seok	111	373	0.3	78

== Top assist providers ==
As of 4 December 2025

Rank	Player	Overall	Apps	Ratio	K League 1
1	(South Korea) Yeom Ki-hun	110	445	0.25	92
2	(Brazil) **Cesinha**	78	289	0.27	70
3	(South Korea) Lee Dong-gook	77	548	0.14	74
4	(Colombia) Mauricio Molina	69	209	0.33	68
4	(South Korea) Shin Tae-yong	69	405	0.17	49
6	(South Korea) Hwang Jin-sung	67	338	0.2	56
7	(Brazil) Eninho	66	231	0.29	56
8	(South Korea) **Kim Tae-hwan**	60	454	0.13	57
8	(South Korea) **Sin Jin-ho**	60	324	0.19	55
10	(Russia) Denis Laktionov	59	273	0.22	43

== Most clean sheets ==
The official website ranks goalkeepers on the basis of the numbers of clean sheets only.

As of 4 December 2025

Rank	Player	Overall	Apps	Ratio	K League 1
1	(South Korea) Kim Byung-ji	229	708	0.32	185
2	(South Korea) Kim Young-kwang	175	605	0.29	103
2	(South Korea) Choi Eun-sung	152	532	0.29	119
4	(South Korea) Lee Woon-jae	140	410	0.34	105
5	(South Korea) **Jo Hyeon-woo**	137	418	0.33	103
6	(South Korea) Kim Yong-dae	133	460	0.29	123
7	(South Korea) (Tajikistan) Shin Eui-son (Valeri Sarychev)	116	325	0.36	89
8	(South Korea) Shin Hwa-yong	113	337	0.34	107
9	(South Korea) Jung Sung-ryong	108	296	0.36	91
10	(South Korea) Kim Ho-jun	92	320	0.29	75

== See also ==
- K League
- K League Top Scorer Award
- K League Top Assist Provider Award
