= Jo Hyeon-woo =

South Korean footballer (born 1991)

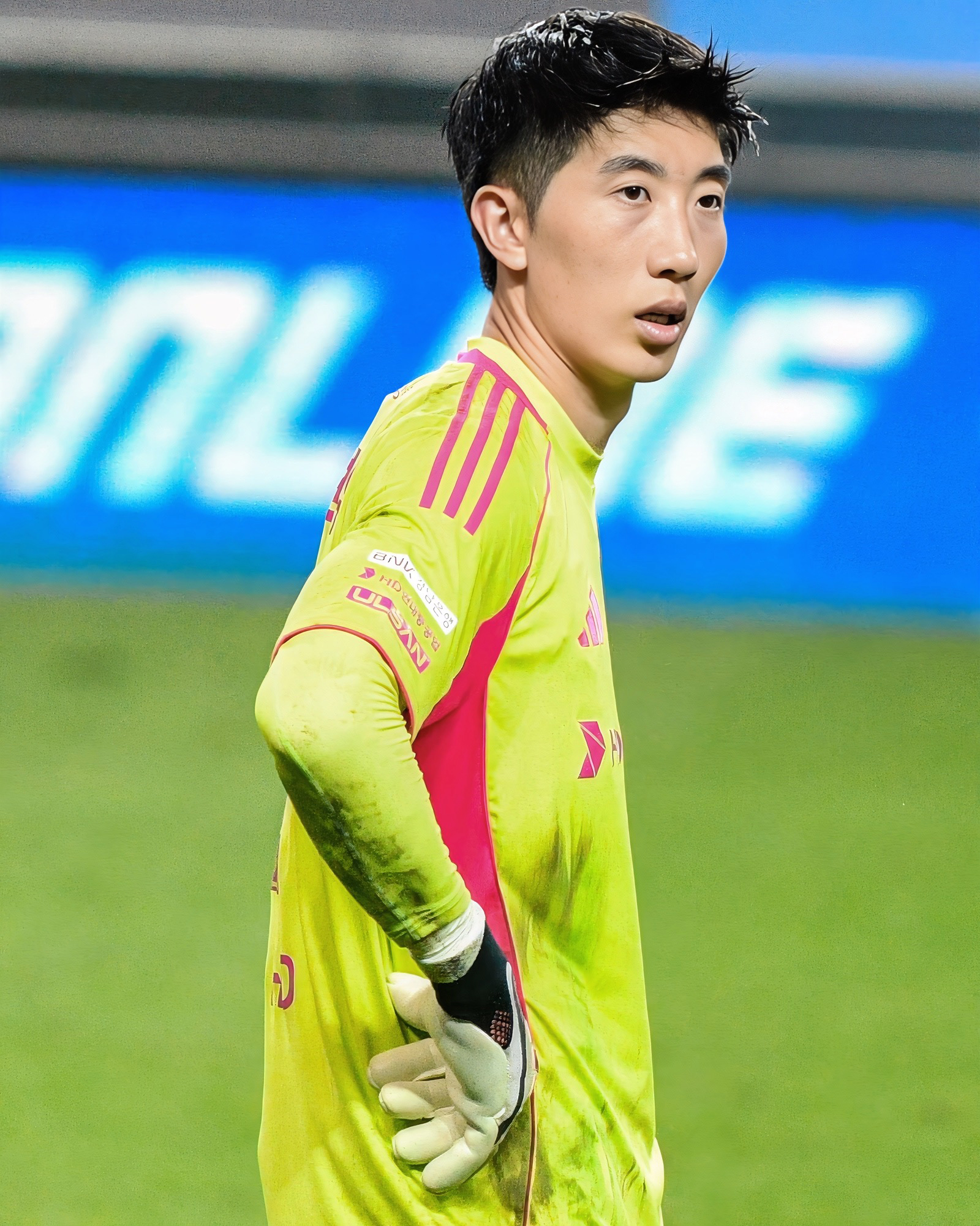
- Jo with Ulsan HD in 2026

Personal information
- Full name: Jo Hyeon-woo
- Date of birth: 25 September 1991 (age 35)
- Place of birth: Seoul, South Korea
- Height: 1.89 m (6 ft 2 in)
- Position: Goalkeeper

Team information
- Current team: Ulsan HD
- Number: 21

Youth career
- 2007–2009: Chung-Ang University High School

College career
Years	Team	Apps	(Gls)
2010–2012	Sun Moon University		

Senior career*
Years	Team	Apps	(Gls)
2013–2019	Daegu FC	209	(0)
2020–	Ulsan HD	242	(0)

International career^{‡}
2010	South Korea U20	2	(0)
2013–2018	South Korea U23	7 (Note: Includes five appearances as an overage player in Asian Games.)	(0)
2017–	South Korea	49	(0)
Medal record
Men's football
Representing South Korea
Asian Games
Gold medal – first place	2018 Jakarta-Palembang
EAFF Championship
Winner	2017 Japan
Winner	2019 South Korea
Runner-up	2022 Japan
Runner-up	2025 South Korea
AFF U-19 Youth Championship
Bronze medal – third place	2010 Vietnam
- * Club domestic league appearances and goals as of 8 November 2026 ‡ National team caps and goals as of 6 October 2026

- Jo Hyeon-woo
- Hangul: 조현우
- Hanja: 趙賢祐
- RR: Jo Hyeonu
- MR: Cho Hyŏnu
- IPA: [t͡ɕo.ɦjʌn.u]

Jo Hyeon-woo (also Cho Hyun-woo, Korean: 조현우, born 25 September 1991) is a South Korean professional footballer who plays as goalkeeper for K League 1 club Ulsan HD and the South Korea national team.

== Early life ==
Jo was inspired to become a goalkeeper by watching Kim Byung-ji at the 1998 FIFA World Cup. He later said, "I was excited about playing football after watching the World Cup as I could be someone else's dream." In his fifth grade, the football coach of Shinjeong Elementary School Ham Sang-heon asked for the best goalkeeper in the schoolyard as he was worried he would not have a goalkeeper. The children pointed to Jo. The coach tested Jo by making him save several shots. This would be the beginning of his career. He has been the main goalkeeper and has played in national tournaments ever since. In response, his old coach said "It was not once or twice that teams won because of Jo's success in the penalty shoot-out".

== Club career ==
After graduating from Sun Moon University, Jo entered the 2013 K League 1 draft and was selected by Daegu FC. He failed to prevent the relegation of his team in his first professional season, and had to compete in the K League 2. Since the 2015 season, Jo evolved into Daegu's first-choice goalkeeper and became the best goalkeeper in the K League 2. He finally helped Daegu promote to the K League 1 in 2016. He also contributed to Daegu's first Korean FA Cup title in 2018.

After a successful career in Daegu, Jo joined Ulsan Hyundai on 20 January 2020. He contributed to Ulsan's three consecutive K League 1 titles from 2022 to 2024, and was named the K League 1 Most Valuable Player in 2024. He became the second goalkeeper to win the K League 1 MVP award, following Lee Woon-jae.

Jo played in three group stage matches for Ulsan at the 2025 FIFA Club World Cup, but lost all three matches. He blocked 10 out of 11 shots on target in the last group stage match against Borussia Dortmund. FIFA website reminded readers of his performance against Germany at the 2018 FIFA World Cup, describing him as the "German hangman". Despite his effort to bring the first victory, Ulsan lost 1–0 without scoring.

== International career ==
=== Early career ===
In November 2015, Jo was called up for South Korea's national team by manager Uli Stielike to play in the 2018 FIFA World Cup qualifiers against Laos and Myanmar. He was selected as the national representative for the EAFF E-1 Football Championship in 2017 winning the competition's best goalkeeper award.

=== 2018 World Cup ===
In May 2018, Jo was named in South Korea's preliminary 28-man squad for the 2018 FIFA World Cup in Russia. Originally expected to be the third-choice keeper, Jo made his international debut in a major competition. His performances in the first two matches against Sweden and Mexico were impressive, despite both ending in defeats for South Korea. He was lauded particularly for his point-blank save against Swedish striker Marcus Berg which put him in the spotlight. Jo then played a prominent role in Germany's historic elimination from the first round of a World Cup for the first time since 1938 with a stellar performance, earning him the Man of the Match award. Jo made seven saves without conceding any goals. Despite this performance, South Korea learned after the match that they had been eliminated from the tournament due to Sweden beating Mexico (South Korea needed Mexico to beat Sweden to advance). South Korea finished ahead of Germany in Group F, placing third.

=== 2018 Asian Games ===
Jo was named in the South Korean under-23 team for the 2018 Asian Games as an over-aged player. He appeared in two matches against Bahrain and Kyrgyzstan in the group stage and finalized them with clean sheets. He also played in the round of 16 against Iran, but he was injured in this match. He was replaced by Song Bum-keun in the quarter-finals against Uzbekistan, but Song conceded three goals. Song received criticisms for his poor performance, and so Jo appeared again in semi-finals and final. He contributed to South Korea's gold medal by conceding only two goals in the tournament and was subsequently exempt from mandatory military service.

=== 2026 World Cup ===
He was called up by Myung-Bo Hong to represent South Korea at the 2026 FIFA World Cup.

== Career statistics ==
=== Club ===
As of match played 8 November 2026

Appearances and goals by club, season and competition
Club	Season	League			Cup		Continental		Other		Total	
Club	Season	Division	Apps	Goals	Apps	Goals	Apps	Goals	Apps	Goals	Apps	Goals
Daegu FC	2013	K League 1	14	0	0	0	—		—		14	0
Daegu FC	2014	K League 2	15	0	0	0	—		—		15	0
Daegu FC	2015	K League 2	40	0	2	0	—		1 (Note: Appearances in K League promotion play-offs)	0	43	0
Daegu FC	2016	K League 2	39	0	2	0	—		—		41	0
Daegu FC	2017	K League 1	35	0	1	0	—		—		36	0
Daegu FC	2018	K League 1	28	0	4	0	—		—		32	0
Daegu FC	2019	K League 1	38	0	0	0	6 (Note: Appearances in AFC Champions League Elite)	0	—		44	0
Daegu FC	Total		209	0	9	0	6	0	1	0	225	0
Ulsan HD	2020	K League 1	27	0	5	0	—		—		32	0
Ulsan HD	2021	K League 1	38	0	1	0	8	0	2 (Note: Appearances in FIFA Club World Cup)	0	49	0
Ulsan HD	2022	K League 1	36	0	1	0	6	0	—		43	0
Ulsan HD	2023	K League 1	36	0	2	0	6	0	—		44	0
Ulsan HD	2024	K League 1	38	0	4	0	11	0	—		53	0
Ulsan HD	2025	K League 1	33	0	2	0	3	0	3	0	41	0
Ulsan HD	2026	K League 1	34	0	0	0	2	0	0	0	36	0
Ulsan HD	Total		242	0	15	0	36	0	5	0	298	0
Career total			451	0	24	0	42	0	6	0	523	0

=== International ===
As of match played 6 October 2026

Appearances and goals by national team and year
National team	Year	Apps	Goals
South Korea	2017	3	0
South Korea	2018	8	0
South Korea	2019	5	0
South Korea	2021	2	0
South Korea	2022	4	0
South Korea	2023	2	0
South Korea	2024	15	0
South Korea	2025	7	0
South Korea	2026	3	0
Career total		49	0

== Filmography ==
=== Television ===
Year	Title	Role	Note(s)	Ref.
2022	Daughter Thieves	Himself		

== Honours ==
Daegu FC

- Korean FA Cup: 2018

Ulsan HD

- K League 1: 2022, 2023, 2024
- Korea Cup runner-up: 2020, 2024

South Korea U23

- Asian Games: 2018

South Korea

- EAFF Championship: 2017, 2019

Individual

- K League 2 Best XI: 2015, 2016
- K League All-Star: 2017, 2019, 2022, 2023, 2024, 2025
- K League 1 Best XI: 2017, 2018, 2019, 2020, 2021, 2022, 2023, 2024
- EAFF Championship Best Goalkeeper: 2017
- AFC Champions League All-Star Squad: 2021
- K League 1 Most Valuable Player: 2024
