= Kang Chun-ho =

South Korean footballer (born 1971)

Kang Chun-Ho
Personal information
- Full name: Kang Chun-Ho
- Date of birth: November 27, 1971 (age 54)
- Place of birth: South Korea
- Height: 1.71 m (5 ft 7 in)
- Position: Defender

Senior career*
Years	Team	Apps	(Gls)
1994–2001	LG Cheetahs / Anyang LG Cheetahs	87	(2)

Managerial career
- 2002–2004: FC Seoul (Scout)
- 2005–2008: FC Seoul Academy U-12 Team
- 2011–present: FC Barcelona Football Academy (Korea Branch)
- * Club domestic league appearances and goals as of 27 December 2007 ‡ National team caps and goals as of 27 December 2007

Kang Chun-Ho (Korean: 강준호, born November 27, 1971, in South Korea) is a South Korean footballer.

== Club career ==
- 1994–2001: LG Cheetahs / Anyang LG Cheetahs

== Honours ==
- Club
  - K League Champions: 2000
  - Korean FA Cup Winners: 1998
- Player
  - Korean FA Cup: 1998 MVP

== Managing career ==
He was FC Seoul reserve team coach in 2005 and appointed Daegu FC scouter in 2006, December.

Sporting positions
Preceded by Kim Bong-Soo	Anyang LG Cheetahs captain 1999	Succeeded by Choi Yong-Soo
