= Cho Jung-hyun =

South Korean footballer (1969–2022)

Cho Jung-hyun 조정현
Personal information
- Full name: Cho Jung-hyun
- Date of birth: 12 November 1969
- Place of birth: South Korea
- Date of death: 10 July 2022 (aged 52)
- Height: 1.72 m (5 ft 8 in)
- Position: Forward

Youth career
- Daegu University

Senior career*
Years	Team	Apps	(Gls)
1992–1998	Yugong Elephants / Bucheon SK	119	(25)
1999	Shenzhen Ping'an	?	(?)
1999	Jeonnam Dragons	11	(0)
2000	Pohang Steelers	9	(1)

International career
1991–1992	South Korea U-23		
1992–1996	South Korea	4	(0)

Managerial career
- 2002–2003: Yeongdeungpo Technical High School (assistant)
- 2003: Bucheon SK (assistant)
- 2004: Gyeongnam FC U-18 Jinju High School
- * Club domestic league appearances and goals

Cho Jung-hyun (Korean: 조정현; 12 November 1969 – 10 July 2022) was a South Korean footballer who played as a forward.

== Club career ==
Cho spent most of his club career playing for Yukong Elephants / Bucheon SK.

== International career ==
He has played in the 1992 Summer Olympics.

== Managerial career ==
At the time of his death he was manager of Gyeongnam FC U-18 Jinju High School.

== Honours ==
Jeju United FC

- Korean League Cup: 1996
