= Jang Chul-woo =

South Korean footballer

Jang Chul-Woo
Personal information
- Full name: Jang Chul-Woo
- Date of birth: 5 April 1971 (age 55)
- Place of birth: South Korea
- Height: 1.84 m (6 ft 1/2 in)
- Position: Midfielder

Senior career*
Years	Team	Apps	(Gls)
1997–2005	Daejeon Citizen	198	(20)
2008	Namyangju United		
- * Club domestic league appearances and goals

Jang Chul-Woo (Korean: 장철우; born 5 April 1971) is a South Korean retired footballer who played as a midfielder. He is considered one of the legendary players in Daejeon Citizen.
