= Kim Hyun-seok (footballer) =

South Korean footballer

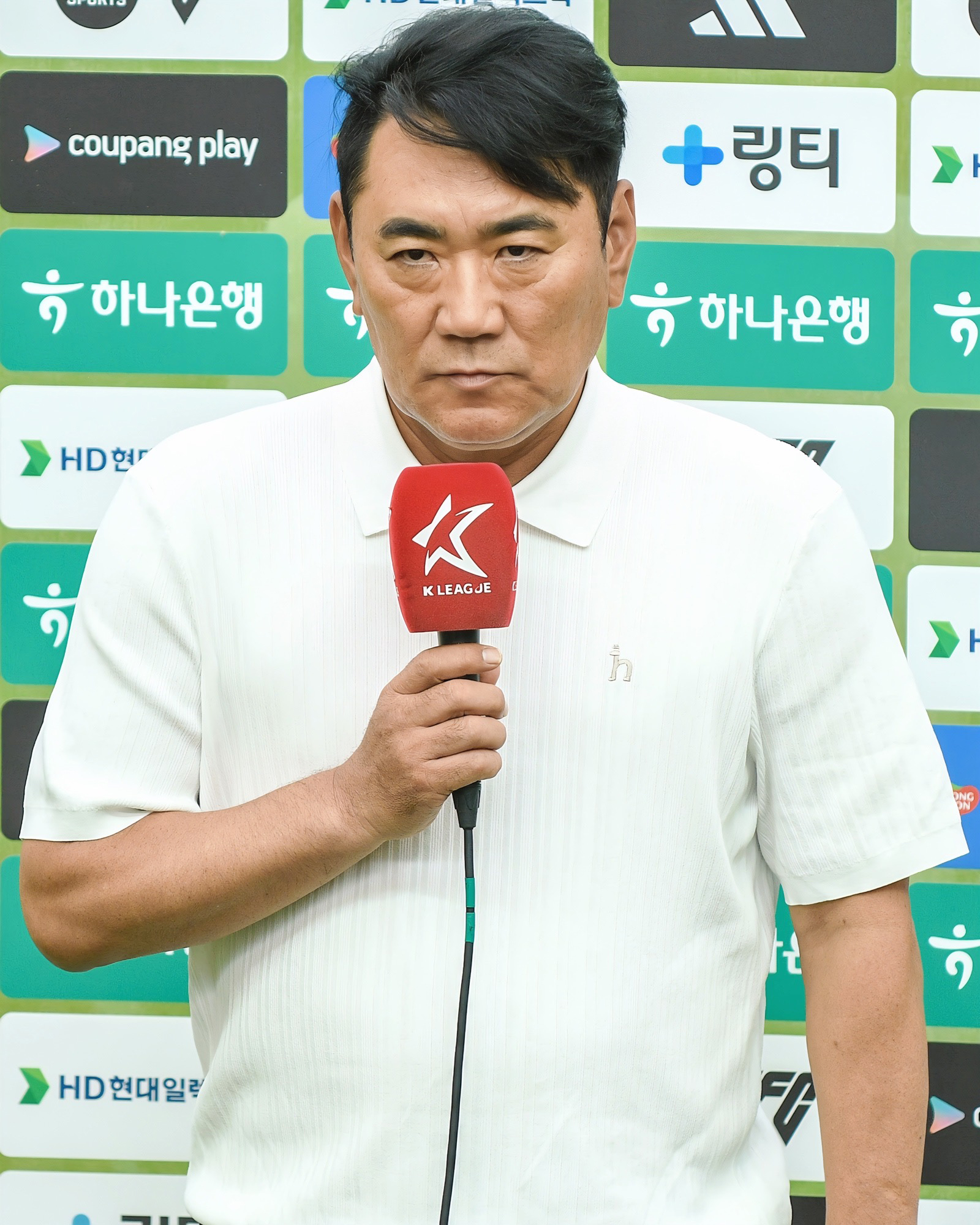
- Kim in 2026

Personal information
- Full name: Kim Hyun-seok
- Date of birth: 5 May 1967 (age 59)
- Place of birth: Samcheok, Gangwon Province, South Korea
- Height: 1.78 m (5 ft 10 in)
- Positions: Striker; defensive midfielder

Team information
- Current team: Ulsan HD (manager)

College career
Years	Team	Apps	(Gls)
1986–1989	Yonsei University		

Senior career*
Years	Team	Apps	(Gls)
1990–1999	Ulsan Hyundai Horang-i	218	(69)
1993–1994	→ Sangmu FC (draft)		
2000	Verdy Kawasaki	25	(16)
2001–2003	Ulsan Hyundai Horang-i	70	(9)
Total		313	(94)

International career
1989	South Korea B		
1990–1999	South Korea	23	(5)

Managerial career
- 2011–2012: Ulsan Hyundai (assistant)
- 2013: Ulsan WFC
- 2018–2021: University of Ulsan
- 2024: Chungnam Asan
- 2025: Jeonnam Dragons
- 2026–: Ulsan HD
Korean name
Hangul	김현석
Hanja	金鉉錫
RR	Gim Hyeonseok
MR	Kim Hyŏnsŏk
- * Club domestic league appearances and goals

Kim Hyun-seok (born 5 May 1967) is a South Korean football manager and former player who mostly played as a striker for Ulsan HD and is the current manager of the club. He had 111 goals and 54 assists while playing for Ulsan in 373 K League matches including Korean League Cup matches.

== Career statistics ==
=== Club ===
Appearances and goals by club, season and competition
Club	Season	League			National cup		League cup		Continental		Other		Total	
Club	Season	Division	Apps	Goals	Apps	Goals	Apps	Goals	Apps	Goals	Apps	Goals	Apps	Goals
Ulsan Hyundai Horang-i	1990	K League	28	5	—		—		—		—		28	5
Ulsan Hyundai Horang-i	1991	K League	39	14	—		—		—		—		39	14
Ulsan Hyundai Horang-i	1992	K League	29	9	—		8	4	—		—		37	13
Ulsan Hyundai Horang-i	1993	K League	11	1	—		0	0	—		—		11	1
Ulsan Hyundai Horang-i	1995	K League	26	12	—		7	6	—		—		33	18
Ulsan Hyundai Horang-i	1996	K League	27	8			7	1	(Note: Appearance(s) in Asian Cup Winners' Cup)		2 (Note: Appearances in K League Championship)	1	36	10
Ulsan Hyundai Horang-i	1997	K League	17	9			13	4	(Note: Appearance(s) in Asian Club Championship)		—		30	13
Ulsan Hyundai Horang-i	1998	K League	14	4			19	12	—		4	1	37	17
Ulsan Hyundai Horang-i	1999	K League	27	7			9	1	—		—		36	8
Ulsan Hyundai Horang-i	Total		218	69			63	28			6	2	287	99
Verdy Kawasaki	2000	J1 League	25	16	0	0	4	1	—		—		29	17
Ulsan Hyundai Horang-i	2001	K League	25	6			6	0	—		—		31	6
Ulsan Hyundai Horang-i	2002	K League	25	3			10	3	—		—		35	6
Ulsan Hyundai Horang-i	2003	K League	20	0			—		—		—		20	0
Ulsan Hyundai Horang-i	Total		70	9			16	3	—		—		86	12
Career total			313	94			83	32			6	2	402	128

=== International ===
Appearances and goals by national team and year
National team	Year	Apps	Goals
South Korea	1990	2	0
South Korea	1991	4	0
South Korea	1992	2	0
South Korea	1993	5	1
South Korea	1994	3	1
South Korea	1995	3	0
South Korea	1996	4	3
Total		23	5

Results list South Korea's goal tally first.

List of international goals scored by Kim Hyun-seok
No.	Date	Venue	Opponent	Score	Result	Competition
1	9 March 1993	Vancouver, Canada	Canada	2–0	2–0	Friendly
2	1 May 1994	Seoul, South Korea	Cameroon	1–1	2–2	Friendly
3	5 August 1996	Ho Chi Minh City, Vietnam	Guam	3–0	9–0	1996 AFC Asian Cup qualification
4	5 August 1996	Ho Chi Minh City, Vietnam	Guam	5–0	9–0	1996 AFC Asian Cup qualification
5	5 August 1996	Ho Chi Minh City, Vietnam	Guam	8–0	9–0	1996 AFC Asian Cup qualification

== Honours ==
=== Player ===
Yonsei University

- Korean President's Cup: 1989
- Korean National Championship runner-up: 1987

Ulsan Hyundai Horang-i

- K League 1: 1996
- Korean League Cup: 1995, 1998
- Korean FA Cup runner-up: 1998

South Korea

- Dynasty Cup: 1990

Individual

- K League All-Star: 1991, 1992, 1997, 1998, 1999, 2001, 2003
- K League 1 Best XI: 1991, 1992, 1995, 1996, 1997, 1998
- K League All-Star Game Most Valuable Player: 1992
- Korean League Cup top goalscorer: 1995, 1998
- K League 1 Most Valuable Player: 1996
- K League 1 top goalscorer: 1997

=== Manager ===
Individual

- K League Manager of the Month: September 2024
