= Kim Bong-hyeon =

South Korean gymnast (born 1975)

Kim Bong-Hyun
- 김봉현
- Alternative name: Kim Bong-hyun
- Born: 11 May 1975 (age 51)

Gymnastics career
- Discipline: Men's artistic gymnastics
- Country represented: South Korea
- Club: Korea National University of Physical Education

Kim Bong-hyeon (born 11 May 1975) is a South Korean gymnast. He competed at the 1996 Summer Olympics.
