= Ulsan HD FC =

Association football club in South Korea

Ulsan HD
- Full name: Ulsan HD Football Club 울산 HD 축구단
- Nickname: Horang-i (Tigers)
- Founded: 1983; 43 years ago (as Hyundai Horang-i)
- Ground: Ulsan Munsu Football Stadium
- Capacity: 37,897
- Owner: Kwon Oh-gap
- Head coach: Kim Hyun-seok
- League: K League 1
- 2025: K League 1, 9th of 12
- Website: uhdfc.com
Home colours	Away colours

Ulsan HD FC (Korean: 울산 HD FC), formerly Ulsan Hyundai FC and commonly known as Ulsan (울산), is a South Korean professional football club based in Ulsan that competes in the K League 1, the top tier of South Korean football league system. Founded in 1983 as Hyundai Horang-i, they joined the K League in 1984. Their home ground is Ulsan Munsu Football Stadium. The club is owned by HD Hyundai Heavy Industries.

Ulsan HD have won the league title five times, most recently in 2024, and the Korean FA Cup once, in 2017. At the international level, they have won the AFC Champions League twice, in 2012 and 2020, and are the only club to have won the tournament twice without defeat.

== History ==
=== Early years: before Ulsan (1983–1989) ===
The club was founded on 6 December 1983 as Hyundai Horang-i, with tiger as its mascot (horangi means tiger in Korean). Their original franchise area was Incheon and Gyeonggi Province. They joined the professional K League from 1984 season. While they finished their debut season as 3rd place, the team's striker Baek Jong-chul became the K League Top Scorer, scoring 16 goals in 28 matches. They won their first professional trophy in 1986, winning the Professional Football Championship, which is the origin of Korean League Cup. From the 1987 season, the club moved their franchise from Incheon and Gyeonggi Province to Gangwon Province. In the 1988 season, they finished the season as the runners-up in the league.

=== Move to Ulsan and rise to power (1990–1999) ===
Beginning in the 1990 season, the club moved their franchise to Ulsan, where the headquarters of several branches of owner company Hyundai are located at, from Gangwon Province. Former South Korea's striker Cha Bum-kun took the managerial position in the 1991 season, leading the club to the runners-up position in the league in his debut season. However, he failed to win any trophy and was replaced by Ko Jae-wook after the 1994 season. Under Ko Jae-wook, Ulsan won their second Korean League Cup trophy in 1995, which was his debut season as Ulsan manager. Ulsan won their first ever league title in 1996, beating Suwon Samsung Bluewings 3–2 on aggregate in the championship playoffs. The club then entered a long dry-spell in terms of league trophies, although they won their third Korean League Cup trophy in 1998, beating Bucheon SK 2–1 on aggregate in the finals.

=== Two Kims era (2000–2013) ===
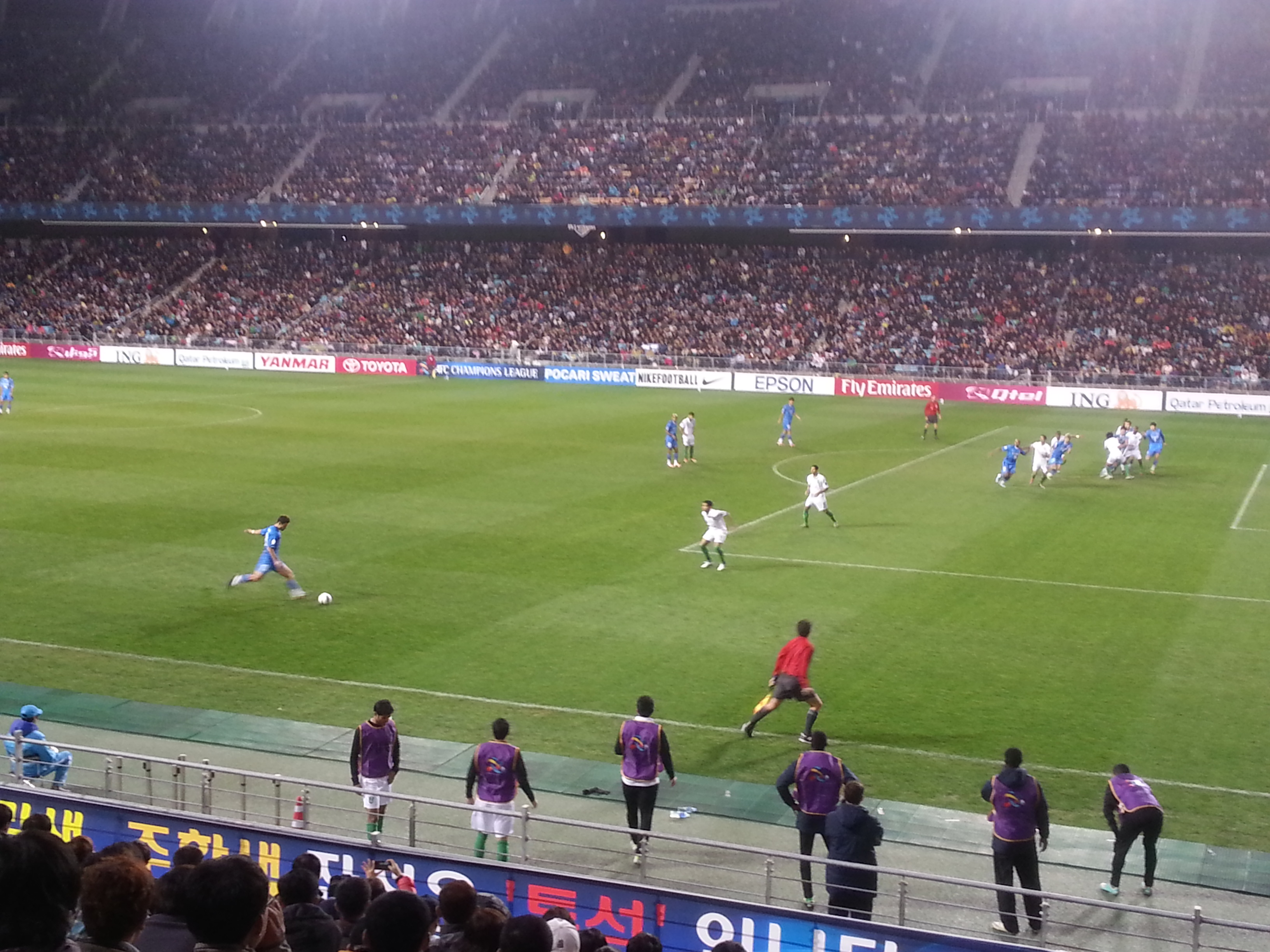
2012 AFC Champions League final at Ulsan Munsu Football Stadium

Failure to add a major title for years did affect the team negatively. After the exodus of key players like Kim Hyun-seok and a terrible start in the 2000, manager Ko Jae-wook resigned in the middle of the season.

==== Kim Jung-nam era: Gangsters of Asia (2000–2008) ====
Ulsan appointed Kim Jung-nam, who had formerly managed South Korea, as their next manager. They finished as runners-up in 2002 and 2003, and started to emerge as a strong force. In 2005, with the return of two key players, Yoo Sang-chul and Lee Chun-soo, they qualified for the championship playoffs. In the play-off semi-final, they beat Seongnam Ilhwa 2–1, and in the final, they beat Incheon United 6–3 on aggregate, with a hat-trick from Lee Chun-Soo in the first leg. They became the league champions for the second time in their history.

The club also went on to win the A3 Champions Cup in 2006, in which they participated as K League champions. Although they lost their first match in the competition against JEF United Ichihara Chiba 3–2, they beat Dalian Shide 4–0 and Gamba Osaka 6–0 to clinch the trophy. Lee Chun-soo became the competition's top scorer, scoring six goals in three matches. They repeated the merciless attacks in the AFC Champions League that season, beating Al-Shabab 6–0 in the first leg of the quarter-finals. These overwhelming attacks they showed in the season gave Ulsan the nickname "Gangsters of Asia".

Ulsan won the 2007 Korean League Cup, beating FC Seoul 2–1 in the final on 27 June 2007. In 2008, the team changed their official name from Ulsan Hyundai Horang-i to Ulsan Hyundai FC.

==== Kim Ho-kon era: Iron Mace Football (2009–2013) ====
Manager Kim Jung-nam stepped down after the 2008 season. Kim Ho-kon, who had managed the South Korea under-23 team that reached the quarter-finals in the 2004 Summer Olympics was appointed as Ulsan's next manager.

Kim Ho-kon did not enjoy Ulsan fans' full support for his first few seasons at the club, mainly because of his defensive tactical style and unsatisfying outcomes. The 2011 season was a dramatic changeover; Ulsan won their fifth Korean League Cup, beating Busan IPark 3–2 in the final. Ulsan also finished the season as runners-up in the K League that season. Their unique style of having many players pushing forward in counterattacks earned them the nickname "Iron mace football".

In 2012, the club won the AFC Champions League, defeating Al-Ahli 3–0 in the final on 10 November. In the run up to the final, Ulsan went on an unbeaten run throughout the twelve games of the competition, winning nine consecutive games and scoring 27 goals in the process.

=== Downfall of the club (2014–2016) ===
Ulsan Hyundai went trophyless for three years after both Cho Min-kook and Yoon Jong-hwan failed to guide the club to any major honours.

=== Return of the golden generation (2017–2024) ===
On 21 November 2016, Ulsan Hyundai hired Kim Do-hoon as their manager. He restored the club status back by guiding the club to the 2017 Korean FA Cup final and winning it 2–1 on aggregate against Busan IPark, the club's first trophy in five years. Three years later, Kim also led Ulsan Hyundai to victory in the 2020 AFC Champions League, defeating Iranian club Persepolis 2–1 in the final. Júnior Negrão scored a brace to secure the club's second AFC Champions League trophy, subsequently qualifying for the 2020 FIFA Club World Cup, where Ulsan finished sixth.

For the 2021 season, Ulsan Hyundai signed former South Korea international player Hong Myung-bo as their manager. He guided the club to consecutive league titles in the 2022 and 2023 seasons. The 2022 title was won in dramatic fashion, as Ulsan defeated rivals Jeonbuk Hyundai Motors, the winners of the previous five K League 1 seasons, with two goals scored by Hungarian international Martin Ádám in injury time. It was Ulsan's first league title since 2005.

In December 2023, Ulsan Hyundai changed its name to Ulsan HD and unveiled a new emblem ahead of the 2024 season. The "HD" comes from the club parent company 'HD Hyundai', which was renamed from Hyundai Heavy Industries Holdings in December 2022. In April 2024, the team qualified for the expanded 2025 FIFA Club World Cup by defeating Yokohama F. Marinos at home in the first leg of the semi-final of the 2023–24 AFC Champions League.

With the departure of Hong Myung-bo to guide the South Korea national team, Ulsan HD hired former Malaysia national team head coach Kim Pan-gon on 28 July 2024. He successfully guided the team to a third consecutive championship title in 2024, thereby establishing a dynasty.

=== A new era (2025–present) ===
Although Ulsan managed to win three national titles and a continental championship over five seasons, the aging of the club's key players became apparent through poor performances on the pitch. The club lost its first five league stage games in the newly rebranded 2024–25 AFC Champions League Elite, and was eliminated from the tournament after a 2–1 loss to Thai side Buriram United in February. The team failed to perform better at the start of the 2025 K League 1 season, sitting seventh in the league table with only 29 points exactly halfway through the season after 19 games.

Ulsan entered the 2025 FIFA Club World Cup as the sole South Korean representative but failed to advance past the group stage. Despite notable performances by Um Won-sang, Lee Jin-hyun, and goalkeeper Jo Hyeon-woo, the club fell 1–0 to South African side Mamelodi Sundowns, 4–2 to Brazilian side Fluminense, and 1–0 to German side Borussia Dortmund. Although Ulsan failed to record a win, they still managed to earn US$9.55 million from participating in the tournament, a record prize sum for the club.

Ulsan's continued poor performances, which included an eleven-game winless streak, led to Kim Pan-gon's sacking in August 2025. The club then appointed former South Korea national team manager Shin Tae-yong to the helm in a bid to rebuild, but he was sacked after just two months after the club was assured of finishing in the bottom half of the league. After the season, in which Ulsan avoided relegation on the last day, the club appointed club legend Kim Hyun-seok as their new manager.

== Stadium ==
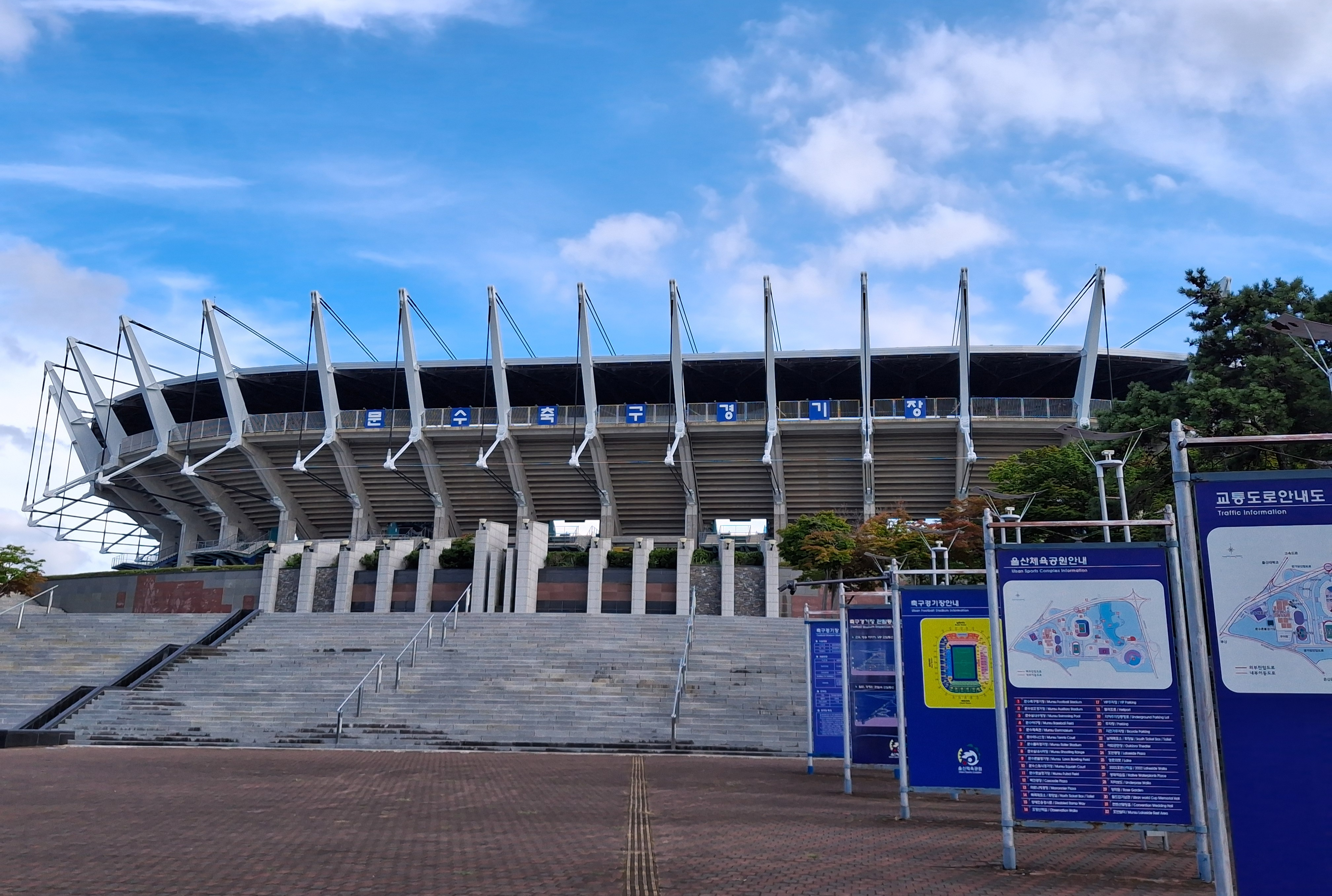
View of the Munsu Stadium in 2026

Ulsan plays at the Ulsan Munsu Football Stadium in Nam District, completed in 2001 in preparation for the 2002 FIFA World Cup. It is one of the largest football-specific stadiums in South Korea. The club previously played in the Ulsan Stadium of the Ulsan Sports Complex.

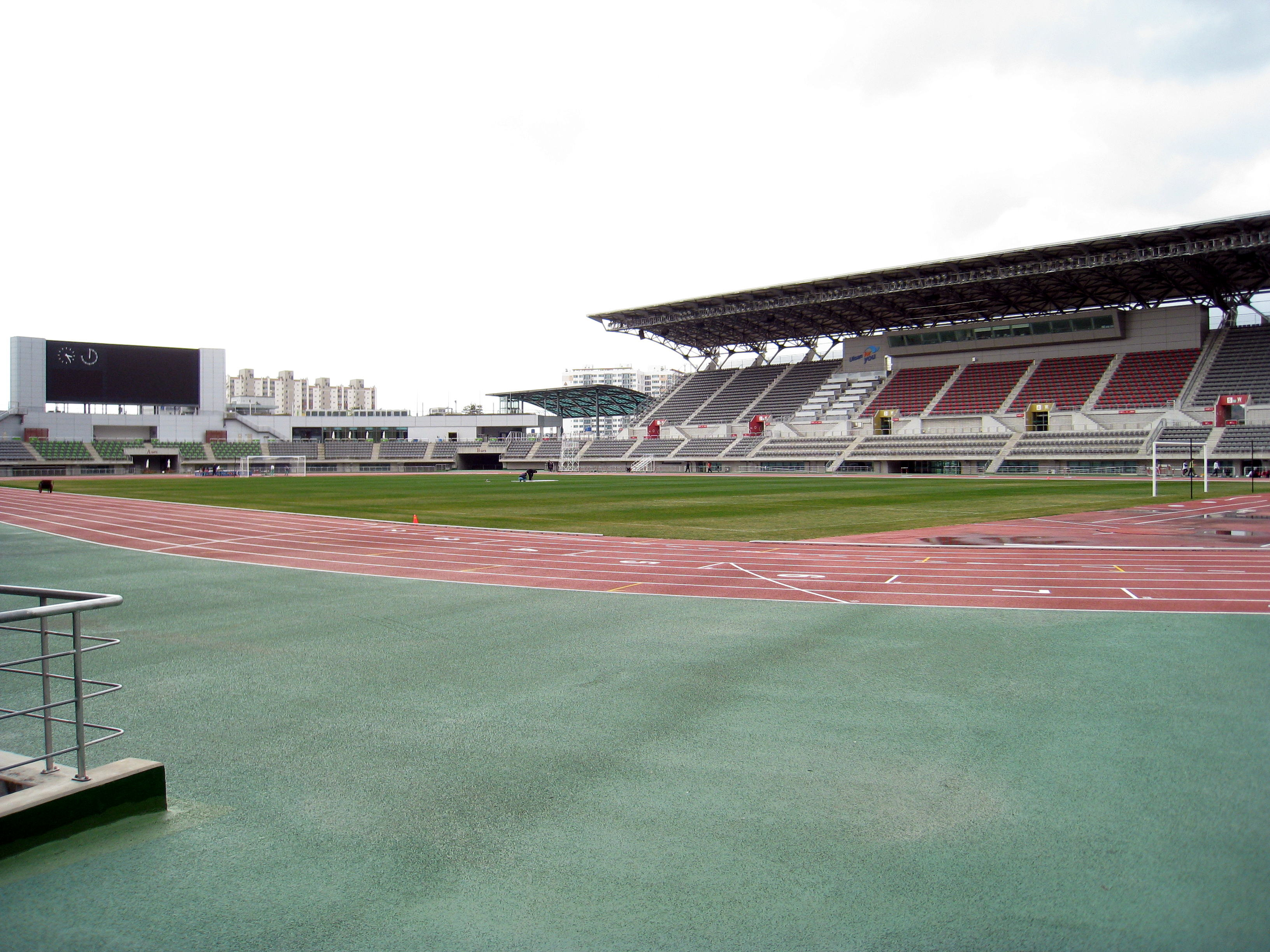
The Ulsan Stadium, former home of Ulsan HD

The club's players train at the Hyundai Sport Club House, completed in 2002, in the city's Dong District.

== Supporters and rivalries ==
=== Supporters ===
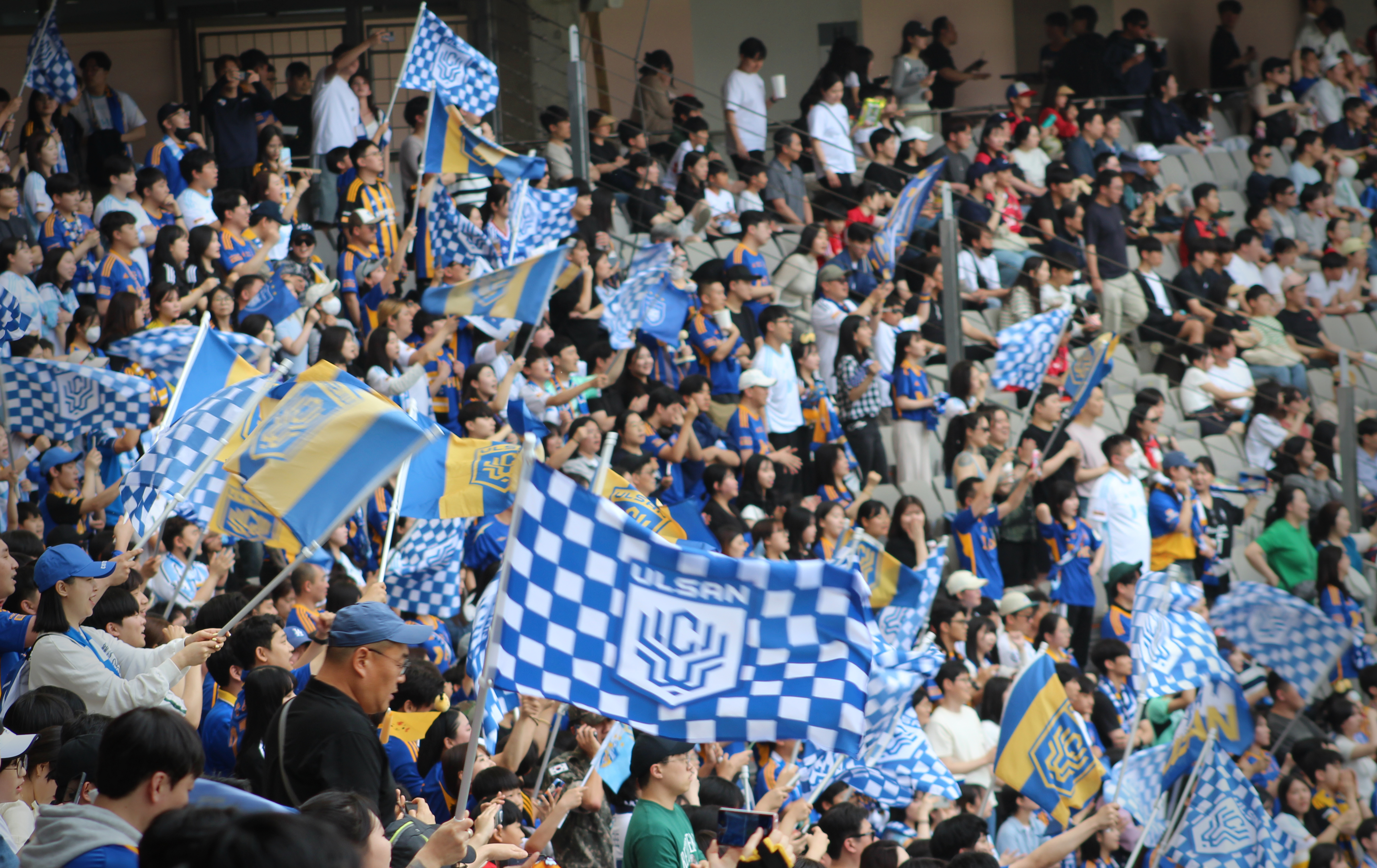
Ulsan supporters away at Seoul World Cup Stadium, 2024

The club's main supporters group is called the Cheoyong Warriors (처용전사), founded in 1997. Cheoyong refers to a legendary figure in Korean folklore associated with the city of Ulsan.

Ulsan's on-pitch success led to an all-time high average attendance in 2024, with the club recording 348,119 fans across 19 home games in the season, the second highest in the league behind only FC Seoul. Besides the city of Ulsan, the club's fans hail from all over South Korea and the surrounding Gyeongsang region in particular.

The club's growing popularity has led to continuously increasing revenue, with the club earning a record 48 billion South Korean won in 2024.

=== Rivalries ===
==== Donghaean (East Coast) Derby ====
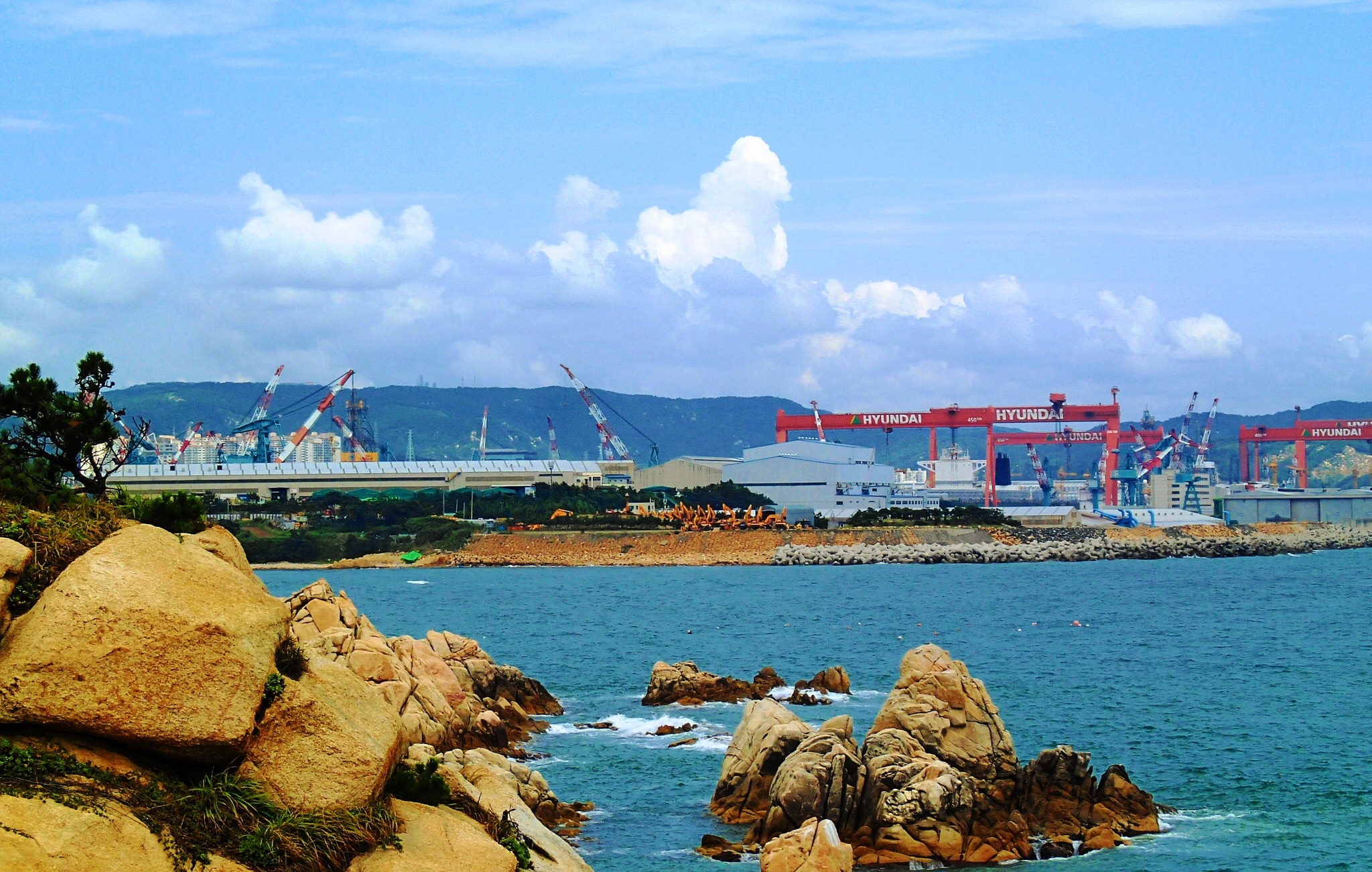
Ulsan is one of the largest industrial cities in South Korea, with a heavy presence of global shipbuilding giant HD Hyundai Heavy Industries

Ulsan competes in the intense Donghaean Derby against the Pohang Steelers, based in nearby Pohang, another of the K League's most successful clubs. The rivalry reflects the economic strength of the two cities: Ulsan is a global hub for shipbuilding, automotive manufacturing, and oil refining, while Pohang hosts steel giant and Steelers owner POSCO.

One of the most memorable matches between the two sides was played in the final round of the 2013 K League Classic season. Ulsan only needed a draw to win the title, but conceded a goal late in injury time and Pohang won the title instead. Ulsan also faced Pohang in the 2024 Korea Cup final, which Pohang won 3–1 after extra time.

In January 2025, members of the Cheoyong Warriors supporters group protested a move by the city government of Ulsan to change the color of some of the seating of the Munsu Football Stadium to red, citing that red is the color of their arch rivals Pohang.

==== Hyundai Derby ====
Since the late 2010s, Ulsan's chief rivals have been Jeonbuk Hyundai Motors in a match known as the Hyundai Derby. Ulsan rose to become the primary rival of Jeonbuk, which dominated South Korean football in the 2010s. Once a one-sided affair, Ulsan's eventual triumph over Jeonbuk in the 2022 season led to an intensification of an already heated rivalry that is arguably still the biggest matchup in the league.

Although the parent companies of Ulsan and Jeonbuk share the Hyundai brand, the parent companies (HD Hyundai for Ulsan and Hyundai Motor for Jeonbuk) are legally separate entities.

== Players ==
=== Current squad ===
As of 12 October 2026

Note: Flags indicate national team as defined under FIFA eligibility rules; some limited exceptions apply. Players may hold more than one non-FIFA nationality.

No.	Pos.	Nation	Player
1	GK	KOR	Choi Ju-ho
2	DF	KOR	Yoon Jong-gyu
3	DF	KOR	Jung Seong-bin
6	MF	SWE	Darijan Bojanić
8	MF	KOR	Lee Hee-gyun
9	FW	BRA	Marcão
10	MF	KOR	Lee Dong-gyeong (vice-captain)
11	FW	BRA	Erick Farias
13	GK	KOR	Ryu Seong-min
14	MF	KOR	Lee Jin-hyun
15	DF	KOR	Jung Seung-hyun (vice-captain)
16	MF	KOR	Park Woo-jin
17	DF	KOR	Kang Sang-woo
19	DF	KOR	Kim Young-gwon (captain)
20	FW	KOR	Jeong Jae-sang
21	GK	KOR	Jo Hyeon-woo
23	GK	KOR	Moon Jung-in

No.	Pos.	Nation	Player
24	MF	KOR	Lee Kyu-seong
26	DF	KOR	Cho Hyun-taek
27	MF	BRA	Pedrinho
28	DF	KOR	Lee Jae-ik
31	GK	KOR	Hwang Byeong-geun
33	MF	KOR	Jang Si-young
37	GK	KOR	Moon Hyun-ho
38	MF	KOR	Park Yong-woo
43	MF	KOR	Jo Min-seo
55	DF	NED	Thomas Oude Kotte
66	DF	POL	Miłosz Trojak
72	MF	KOR	Baek In-woo
77	DF	KOR	Sim Sang-min
91	MF	USA	Benji Michel
96	DF	KOR	Choi Seok-hyun
99	FW	BRA	Yago Cariello

=== Out on loan ===
Note: Flags indicate national team as defined under FIFA eligibility rules; some limited exceptions apply. Players may hold more than one non-FIFA nationality.

No.	Pos.	Nation	Player
—	DF	KOR	Kang Min-woo (at Kataller Toyama)
—	DF	KOR	Lee Jae-hyung (at Yongin FC)
—	DF	KOR	Park Min-seo (at Gimcheon Sangmu for military service)
—	DF	KOR	Seo Myung-gwan (at Gimcheon Sangmu for military service)

No.	Pos.	Nation	Player
—	MF	KOR	Lee Min-hyeok (at Incheon United)
—	MF	KOR	Yoon Jae-seok (at Gimcheon Sangmu for military service)
—	FW	KOR	Heo Yool (at Gimcheon Sangmu for military service)
—	FW	KOR	Kim Bum-hwan (at Hwaseong FC)

== Managers ==
No.	Name	From	To	Honours
1	(South Korea) Moon Jung-sik	12 July 1983	22 April 1986	
C	(South Korea) Cho Chung-yun	22 April 1986	December 1986	Professional Football Championship
2	(South Korea) Cho Chung-yun	December 1986	30 December 1987	Professional Football Championship
3	(South Korea) Kim Ho	30 December 1987	19 November 1990	
4	(South Korea) Cha Bum-kun	23 November 1990	27 November 1994	
5	(South Korea) Ko Jae-wook	30 November 1994	12 June 2000	1995 Korean League Cup; 1996 K League; 1998 Korean League Cup
C	(South Korea) Chung Jong-soo	12 June 2000	21 August 2000	
6	(South Korea) Kim Jung-nam	22 August 2000	25 December 2008	2005 K League; 2007 Korean League Cup
7	(South Korea) Kim Ho-kon	26 December 2008	4 December 2013	2011 Korean League Cup; 2012 AFC Champions League
8	(South Korea) Cho Min-kook	6 December 2013	1 December 2014	
9	(South Korea) Yoon Jong-hwan	1 December 2014	14 November 2016	
10	(South Korea) Kim Do-hoon	21 November 2016	20 December 2020	2017 Korean FA Cup; 2020 AFC Champions League
11	(South Korea) Hong Myung-bo	24 December 2020	11 July 2024	2022 K League 1; 2023 K League 1
C	(South Korea) Lee Kyung-soo	11 July 2024	28 July 2024	
12	(South Korea) Kim Pan-gon	28 July 2024	2 August 2025	2024 K League 1
13	(South Korea) Shin Tae-yong	5 August 2025	9 October 2025	
C	(South Korea) Roh Sang-rae	9 October 2025	24 December 2025	
14	(South Korea) Kim Hyun-seok	24 December 2025	present	

== Honours ==
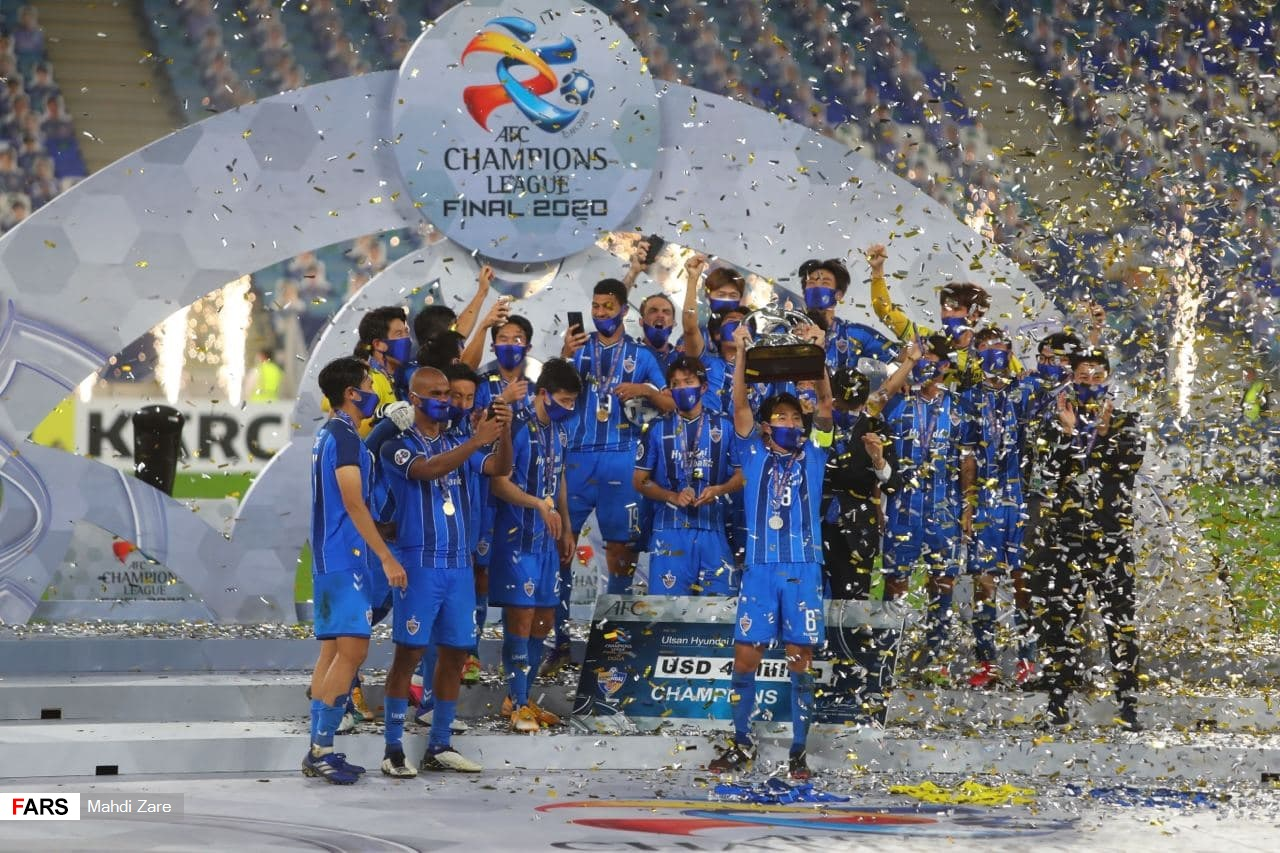
Ulsan Hyundai players lifting their second AFC Champions League trophy in 2020

=== Domestic ===
==== League ====
- K League 1
  - Champions (5): 1996, 2005, 2022, 2023, 2024
  - Runners-up (10): 1986, 1991, 1998, 2002, 2003, 2011, 2013, 2019, 2020, 2021

==== Cups ====
- Korean FA Cup
  - Winners (1): 2017
  - Runners-up (4): 1998, 2018, 2020, 2024
- Korean League Cup
  - Winners (5): 1986, 1995, 1998, 2007, 2011
  - Runners-up (3): 1993, 2002, 2005
- Korean Super Cup
  - Winners (1): 2006
- National Football Championship
  - Runners-up (2): 1989, 1999 (Note: Reserve team)
- Korean President's Cup
  - Runners-up (1): 1990

=== International ===
- AFC Champions League
  - Winners (2): 2012, 2020
- A3 Champions Cup
  - Winners (1): 2006

== Season-by-season records ==
=== Domestic record ===
Season	Division	Tms.	Pos.	Cup
1984	1	8	3	—
1985	1	8	4	—
1986	1	6	6	—
1987	1	5	4	—
1988	1	5	2	—
1989	1	6	6	—
1990	1	6	5	—
1991	1	6	2	—
1992	1	6	3	—
1993	1	6	3	—
1994	1	7	4	—
1995	1	8	2	—
1996	1	9	1	Semi-final
1997	1	10	3	Quarter-final
1998	1	10	2	Runners-up
1999	1	10	6	Semi-final
2000	1	10	10	Quarter-final
2001	1	10	6	Semi-final
2002	1	10	2	Quarter-final
2003	1	12	2	Semi-final
2004	1	13	4	Semi-final
2005	1	13	1	Round of 16
2006	1	14	5	Round of 32
2007	1	14	4	Quarter-final
2008	1	14	3	Quarter-final
2009	1	15	8	Round of 32
2010	1	15	5	Round of 16
2011	1	16	2	Semi-final
2012	1	16	5	Semi-final
2013	1	14	2	Round of 16
2014	1	12	6	Round of 16
2015	1	12	7	Semi-final
2016	1	12	4	Semi-final
2017	1	12	4	Winners
2018	1	12	3	Runners-up
2019	1	12	2	Round of 32
2020	1	12	2	Runners-up
2021	1	12	2	Semi-final
2022	1	12	1	Semi-final
2023	1	12	1	Quarter-final
2024	1	12	1	Runners-up
2025	1	12	9	Quarter-final

Key

- Tms. = Number of teams
- Pos. = Position in league

=== Continental record ===
All results list Ulsan's goal tally first.

==== AFC Champions League ====
Season	Round	Opposition	Home	Away	Agg.
2006	Group F	(Japan) Tokyo Verdy	1–0	2–0	1st
2006	Quarter-final	(Saudi Arabia) Al-Shabab	6–0	1–0	7–0
2006	Semi-final	(South Korea) Jeonbuk Hyundai Motors	1–4	3–2	4–6
2009	Group E	(Japan) Nagoya Grampus	1–3	1–4	3rd
2009	Group E	(Australia) Newcastle Jets	0–1	0–2	3rd
2009	Group E	(China) Beijing Guoan	1–0	1–0	3rd
2012	Group F	(China) Beijing Guoan	2–1	3–2	1st
2012	Group F	(Japan) FC Tokyo	1–0	2–2	1st
2012	Group F	(Australia) Brisbane Roar	1–1	2–1	1st
2012	Round of 16	(Japan) Kashiwa Reysol	3–2	—N/a	—N/a
2012	Quarter-final	(Saudi Arabia) Al-Hilal	1–0	4–0	5–0
2012	Semi-final	(Uzbekistan) Bunyodkor	2–0	3–1	5–1
2012	Final	(Saudi Arabia) Al-Ahli	3–0	—N/a	—N/a
2014	Group H	(Australia) Western Sydney Wanderers	0–2	3–1	3rd
2014	Group H	(Japan) Kawasaki Frontale	2–0	1–3	3rd
2014	Group H	(China) Guizhou Renhe	1–1	1–3	3rd
2017	Play-off	(Hong Kong) Kitchee	1–1 (a.e.t.) (4–3 p)	—N/a	—N/a
2017	Group E	(Japan) Kashima Antlers	0–4	0–2	3rd
2017	Group E	(Australia) Brisbane Roar	6–0	3–2	3rd
2017	Group E	(Thailand) Muangthong United	0–0	0–1	3rd
2018	Group F	(Australia) Melbourne Victory	6–2	3–3	2nd
2018	Group F	(Japan) Kawasaki Frontale	2–1	2–2	2nd
2018	Group F	(China) Shanghai SIPG	0–1	2–2	2nd
2018	Round of 16	(South Korea) Suwon Samsung Bluewings	1–0	0–3	1–3
2019	Play-off	(Malaysia) Perak	5–1	—N/a	—N/a
2019	Group H	(Australia) Sydney FC	1–0	0–0	1st
2019	Group H	(China) Shanghai SIPG	1–0	0–5	1st
2019	Group H	(Japan) Kawasaki Frontale	1–0	2–2	1st
2019	Round of 16	(Japan) Urawa Red Diamonds	0–3	2–1	2–4
2020	Group F (Note: Matches were played at neutral venues due to the COVID-19 pandemic, with "home" and "away" used for administrative purposes.)	(Japan) FC Tokyo	1–1	2–1	1st
2020	Group F	(China) Shanghai Shenhua	3–1	4–1	1st
2020	Group F	(Australia) Perth Glory	2–0	2–1	1st
2020	Round of 16	(Australia) Melbourne Victory	3–0		
2020	Quarter-final	(China) Beijing Guoan	2–0		
2020	Semi-final	(Japan) Vissel Kobe	2–1 (a.e.t.)		
2020	Final	(Iran) Persepolis	2–1		
2021	Group F	(Vietnam) Viettel	3–0	1–0	1st
2021	Group F	(Thailand) BG Pathum United	2–0	2–0	1st
2021	Group F	(Philippines) Kaya–Iloilo	2–1	3–0	1st
2021	Round of 16	(Japan) Kawasaki Frontale	0–0 (a.e.t.) (3–2 p)		
2021	Quarter-final	(South Korea) Jeonbuk Hyundai Motors	3–2 (a.e.t.)		
2021	Semi-final	(South Korea) Pohang Steelers	1–1 (a.e.t.) (4–5 p)		
2022	Play-off	(Thailand) Port	3–0		
2022	Group I	(Japan) Kawasaki Frontale	3–2	1–1	3rd
2022	Group I	(Malaysia) Johor Darul Ta'zim	1–2	1–2	3rd
2022	Group I	(China) Guangzhou	3–0	5–0	3rd
2023–24	Group I	(Thailand) BG Pathum United	3–1	3–1	2nd
2023–24	Group I	(Japan) Kawasaki Frontale	2–2	0–1	2nd
2023–24	Group I	(Malaysia) Johor Darul Ta'zim	3–1	1–2	2nd
2023–24	Round of 16	(Japan) Ventforet Kofu	3–0	2–1	5–1
2023–24	Quarter-final	(South Korea) Jeonbuk Hyundai Motors	1–0	1–1	2–1
2023–24	Semi-final	(Japan) Yokohama F. Marinos	1–0	2–3 (a.e.t.)	3–3 (4–5 p)

==== AFC Champions League Elite ====
Season	Round	Opposition	Home	Away	Agg.
2024–25	League stage	(Japan) Kawasaki Frontale	0–1	—N/a	10th out of 12 (eliminated)
2024–25	League stage	(Japan) Yokohama F. Marinos	—N/a	0–4	10th out of 12 (eliminated)
2024–25	League stage	(Japan) Vissel Kobe	0–2	—N/a	10th out of 12 (eliminated)
2024–25	League stage	(Malaysia) Johor Darul Ta'zim	—N/a	0–3	10th out of 12 (eliminated)
2024–25	League stage	(China) Shanghai Port	1–3	—N/a	10th out of 12 (eliminated)
2024–25	League stage	(China) Shanghai Shenhua	—N/a	2–1	10th out of 12 (eliminated)
2024–25	League stage	(Thailand) Buriram United	—N/a	1–2	10th out of 12 (eliminated)
2024–25	League stage	(China) Shandong Taishan	Cancelled	—N/a	10th out of 12 (eliminated)
2025–26	League stage	(China) Chengdu Rongcheng	2–1	—N/a	9th out of 12 (eliminated)
2025–26	League stage	(China) Shanghai Shenhua	—N/a	1–1	9th out of 12 (eliminated)
2025–26	League stage	(Japan) Sanfrecce Hiroshima	1–0	—N/a	9th out of 12 (eliminated)
2025–26	League stage	(Japan) Vissel Kobe	—N/a	0–1	9th out of 12 (eliminated)
2025–26	League stage	(Thailand) Buriram United	0–0	—N/a	9th out of 12 (eliminated)
2025–26	League stage	(Japan) Machida Zelvia	—N/a	1–3	9th out of 12 (eliminated)
2025–26	League stage	(Australia) Melbourne City	1–2	—N/a	9th out of 12 (eliminated)
2025–26	League stage	(China) Shanghai Port	—N/a	0–0	9th out of 12 (eliminated)

== See also ==
- List of football clubs in South Korea
- Ulsan Hyundai Mipo Dockyard FC
