= Je Yong-sam =

South Korea footballer (born 1972)

Je Yong-sam 제용삼
Personal information
- Full name: Je Yong-sam
- Date of birth: 25 January 1972 (age 54)
- Height: 1.80 m (5 ft 11 in)
- Position: Striker

Youth career
- 1992–1993: Hansung University

Senior career*
Years	Team	Apps	(Gls)
1994–1997	E-Land Puma	?	(?)
1998–2000	Anyang LG Cheetahs	36	(4)
2001–2002	Seoul Metropolitan Government FC	?	(?)
2007–2008	Seoul United	41	(30)
- * Club domestic league appearances and goals as of 11 September 2007 ‡ National team caps and goals as of 11 September 2007

Je Yong-sam (Korean: 제용삼; born 25 January 1972) is a retired South Korean football player.

== Club career ==
Je Yong-sam was famous for scoring 2 goals in 1998 FA Cup final.

== Honours ==
=== Club ===
Anyang LG Cheetahs

- K League (1) 2000
- Korean FA Cup (1) 1998
