= Rubenilson =

Belgian footballer

Personal information
- Full name: Rubenilson Monteiro Ferreira
- Date of birth: 8 July 1972 (age 54)
- Place of birth: São Luis, Brazil
- Height: 1.77 m (5 ft 10 in)
- Position: Attacking midfielder

Youth career
- Flamengo

Senior career*
Years	Team	Apps	(Gls)
1989–1992	Standard Liège	28	(1)
1992–1994	R.W.D. Molenbeek	49	(16)
1994–1996	Royal Antwerp	32	(5)
1996	Nice	9	(0)
1997–1998	Cheoan Ilhwa Chunma	54	(13)
1999	Bursaspor	13	(2)
2000–2001	Visé		
2002–2003	Maccabi Petah Tikva	7	(1)
2003–2004	Extremadura	10	(0)
2004	Universitatea Craiova	8	(1)
2005	RFC Liège		
2005–2006	Ronse	21	(3)
Total		223	(42)

International career
1993	Belgium U21	3	(0)
- * Club domestic league appearances and goals

Rubenilson Monteiro Ferreira (born 8 July 1972) is a retired football player. He played as an attacking midfielder. Born in Brazil, he was a youth international for Belgium.
