= Kim In-wan =

South Korean footballer and coach

Kim In-Wan
Personal information
- Full name: Kim In-Wan
- Date of birth: 13 February 1971 (age 55)
- Place of birth: South Korea
- Position: Midfielder

Team information
- Current team: Jeonnam Dragons (caretaker)

Senior career*
Years	Team	Apps	(Gls)
1995–1999	Chunnam Dragons	80	(10)
1999–2000	Seongnam Ilhwa Chunma	12	(3)

International career
1987	South Korea U-17		
1991–1992	South Korea U-23		

Managerial career
- Chunnam Dragons U-15
- 2008–2009: Chunnam Dragons U-18
- 2009–2010: Chunnam Dragons reserve (coach)
- 2011: Busan IPark (coach)
- 2012: Busan IPark (assistant)
- 2013: Daejeon Citizen
- 2014–2016: South Korea U-20 (assistant)
- 2017: Gwangyang Jecheol High School
- 2018: Jeonnam Dragons (caretaker)
- * Club domestic league appearances and goals

Kim In-Wan (Korean: 김인완; born 13 February 1971) is a South Korean retired footballer and football coach. He is currently manager of Daejeon Citizen. On 5 December 2012, he was appointed manager of Daejeon Citizen.
