= Jeonju Sports Complex Stadium =

Stadium in Jeonju, South Korea

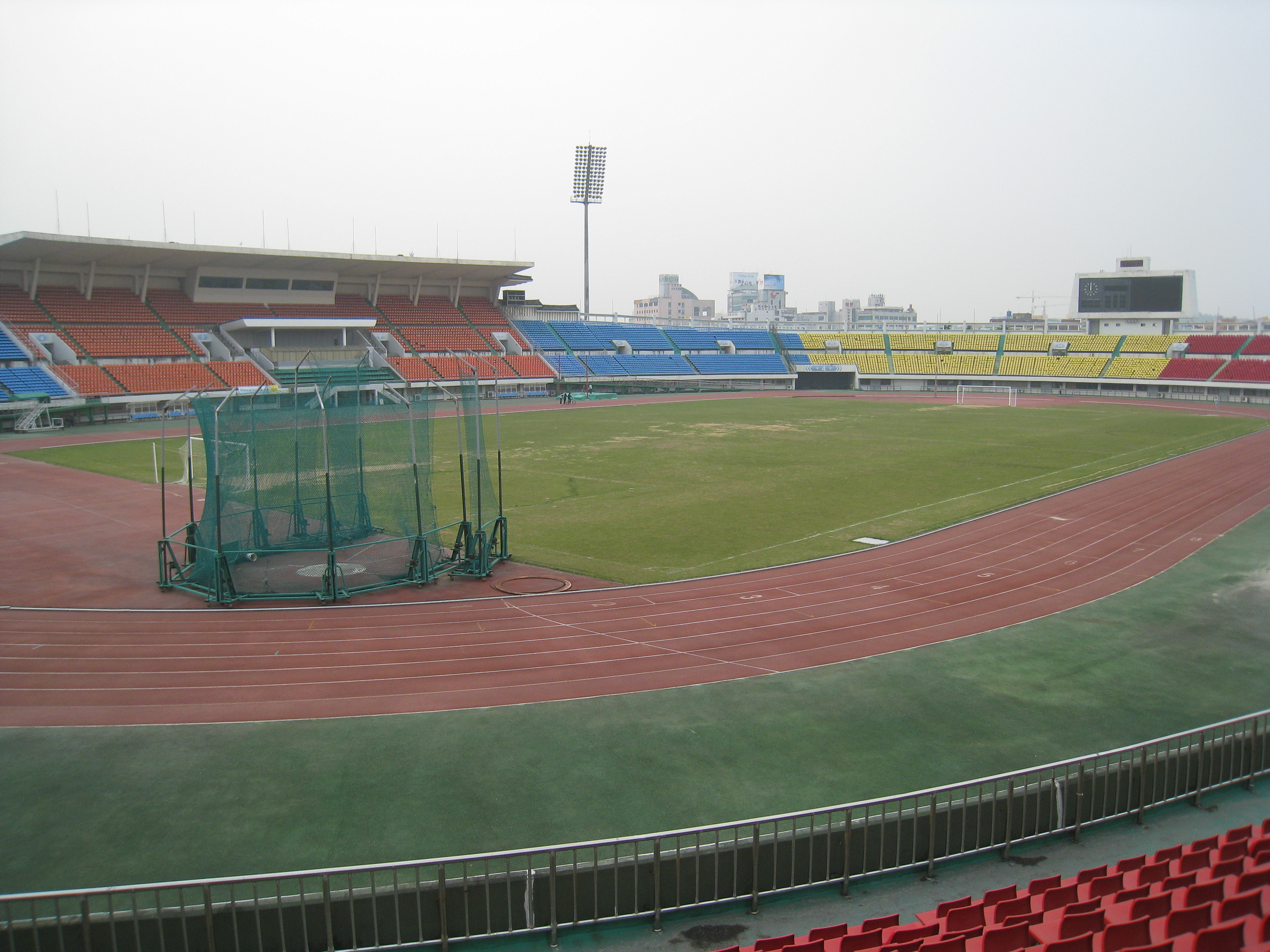
- Interactive map of Jeonju Sports Complex Stadium
- Location: 1220-1, Deokjin-gu, Jeonju, South Korea
- Coordinates: 35.839064°N 127.126311°E
- Owner: Jeonju City
- Operator: Jeonju City Facilities Management Corporation
- Capacity: 30,000

Construction
- Opened: 1980
- Demolished: August 8, 2025

Tenants
- Chonbuk Buffalo (1994); Jeonbuk Hyundai Motors (1995–2002, 2017); Jeonju Ongoeul FC (2005–2008); Jeonju Citizen FC (2017–present)

Jeonju Sports Complex Stadium (also Jeonju Civil Stadium; Korean: 전주종합운동장) is a multi-purpose stadium in Jeonju, South Korea. It is currently used mostly for football matches. The stadium has a capacity of 30,000 people and was built in 1980. Jeonbuk Hyundai Motors used this stadium from 1995 to 2002.
