= Mokdong Stadium =

Sports complex in Seoul, South Korea

Coordinates: 37°31′49.72″N 126°52′59.30″E

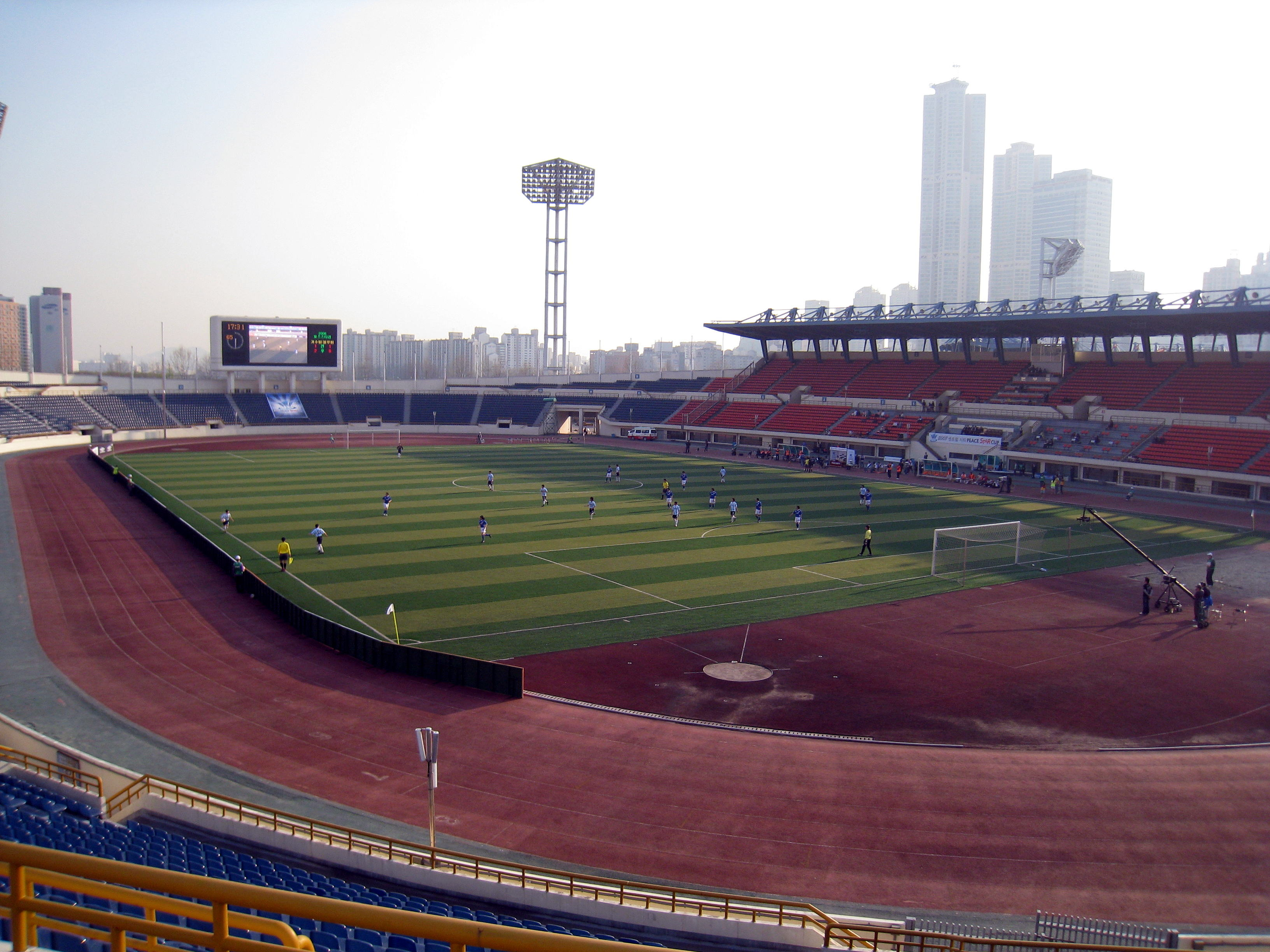
- Interactive map of Mokdong Stadium
- Location: 914 Mok-dong, Yangcheon-gu, Seoul, South Korea
- Operator: Seoul Facilities Management Corporation
- Capacity: 15,511
- Surface: Grass

Construction
- Groundbreaking: 9 December 1987
- Opened: 14 November 1989
- Cost: 8.5 billion won

Tenants
- Bucheon SK (1996–2000); Anyang LG Cheetahs (2001); Seoul City WFC (2020–2021); Seoul E-Land (2022–present)

The Mokdong Stadium (Korean: 목동주경기장; Hanja: 木洞運動場) is a South Korean sports complex located in Mok-dong, Yangcheon District, Seoul. It consists of a multi-purpose stadium, a baseball stadium, and an artificial ice rink. It was opened on 14 November 1989. The main stadium hosted K League football matches from 1996 to 2001.

== Facilities ==
=== Mokdong Stadium ===
Mokdong Stadium is a multi-purpose stadium and is used mostly for association football and athletics. It was the home stadium of Bucheon SK between 1996 and 2000. The stadium holds 25,000 spectators (15,511 seated) and was opened in 1989.

Currently, the stadium serves as the temporary home ground for K League 2 club Seoul E-Land FC. It is expected that the club will play their home matches at least until the end of the 2026 season, while renovations on their main home turf, the Seoul Olympic Stadium, are being made.

=== Mokdong Baseball Stadium ===
- For details, see Mokdong Baseball Stadium.

=== Mokdong Ice Rink ===
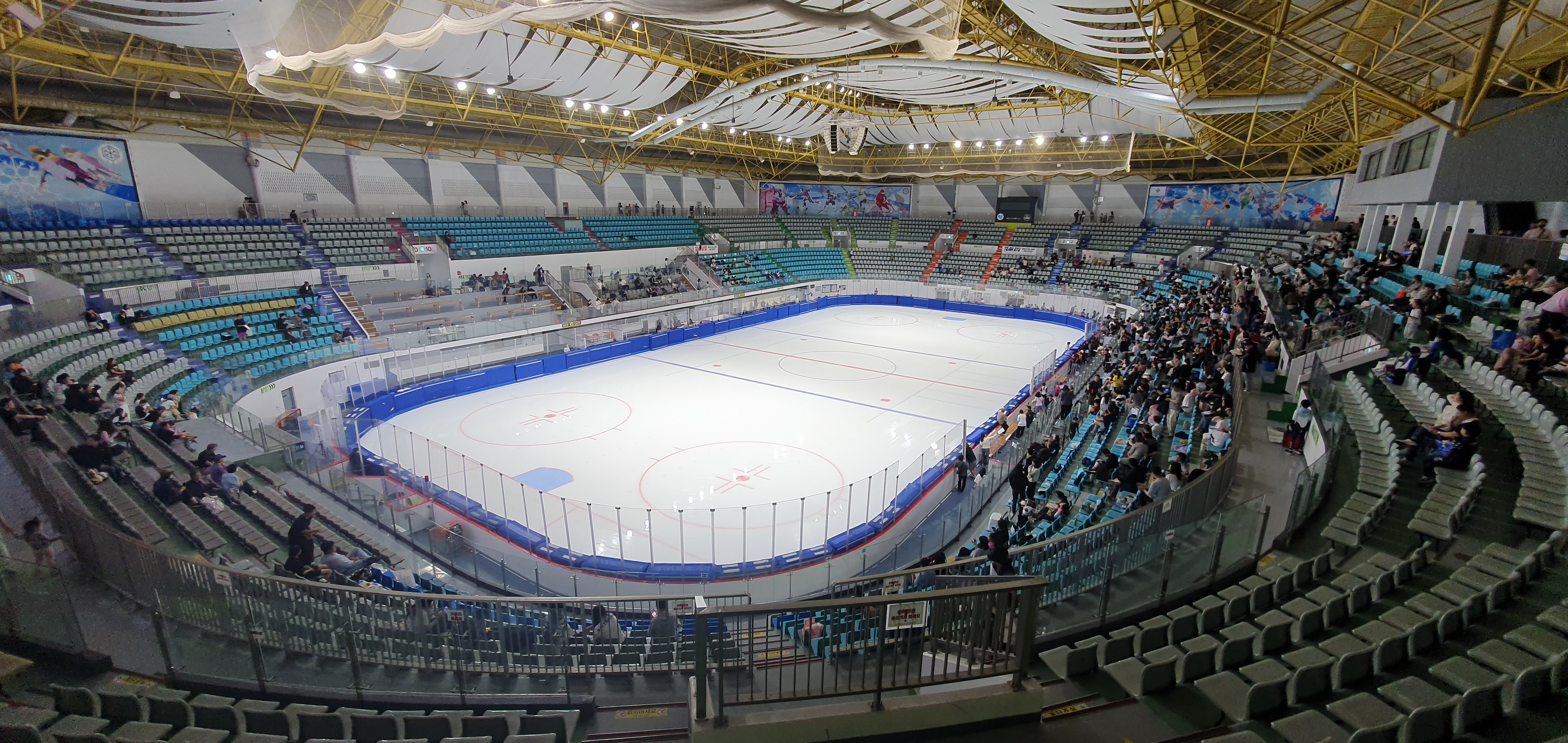
Mokdong Ice Rink

Mokdong Ice Rink has hosted a range of major international competitions, including the 2023 World Short Track Speed Skating Championships. The venue has also been used by the Asia League Ice Hockey teams Daemyung Sangmu and Daemyung Killer Whales.

The rink was used as a filming location for the television series Lovers in Paris, where Ki-joo (Park Shin-yang) and Soo-hyuk (Lee Dong-gun) played ice hockey.

== See also ==
- Hyochang Stadium
- Dongdaemun Stadium
- Seoul World Cup Stadium
