= Ulsan Stadium =

Sports venue in Ulsan, South Korea

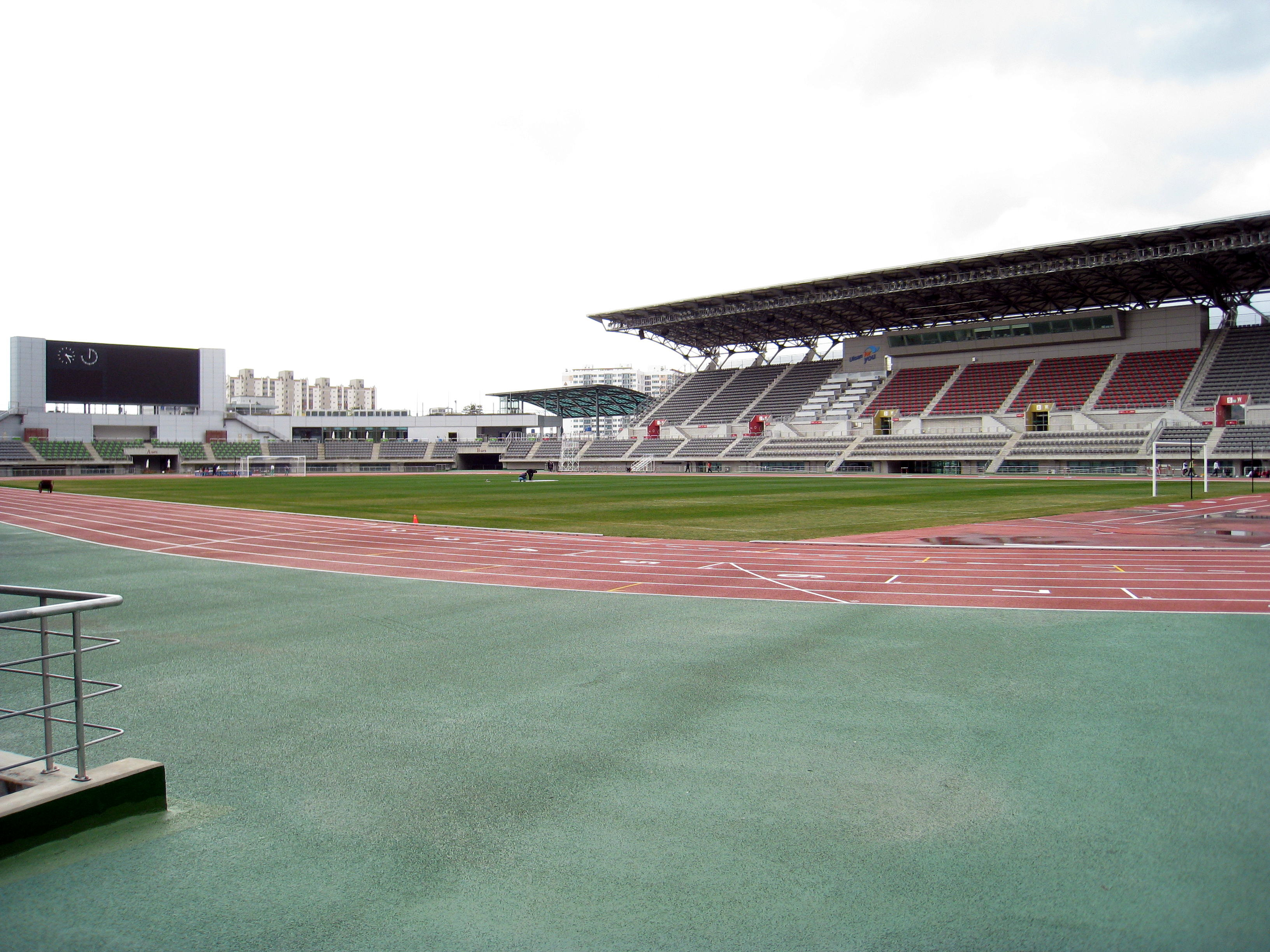
- Interactive map of Ulsan Stadium
- Former names: Ulsan Civic Stadium
- Location: 865, Namoe-dong, Jung-gu, Ulsan, South Korea
- Coordinates: 35.562174°N 129.348065°E
- Owner: City of Ulsan
- Operator: City of Ulsan
- Capacity: 19,471
- Surface: Natural grass

Construction
- Groundbreaking: October 15, 2003
- Opened: August 25, 2005

Tenants
- Ulsan Hyundai Mipo Dockyard Dolphin (2005–2016); Ulsan Hyundai (2019); Ulsan Citizen (2019–present)

Ulsan Stadium is a multi-purpose stadium located in Ulsan Sports Complex, Ulsan, South Korea. Originally, Ulsan Civic Stadium, which had opened in 1970, occupied the same location. The original stadium was demolished in 2003 and replaced with Ulsan Sport Complex. Ulsan Sports Complex consists of the Ulsan Stadium and Dongchun Gymnasium. Ulsan Stadium is a multi-purpose venue mainly used for football; it was the home ground of the Ulsan Hyundai before they moved to Ulsan Munsu Football Stadium in 2001 and was the home stadium of Ulsan Hyundai Mipo Dockyard between 2005 and 2016. The stadium has a capacity for 19,471 spectators.

== See also ==
- Ulsan Civic Stadium
