= Gwangyang Football Stadium =

Football stadium in Gwangyang, South Korea

- Dragon Dungeon
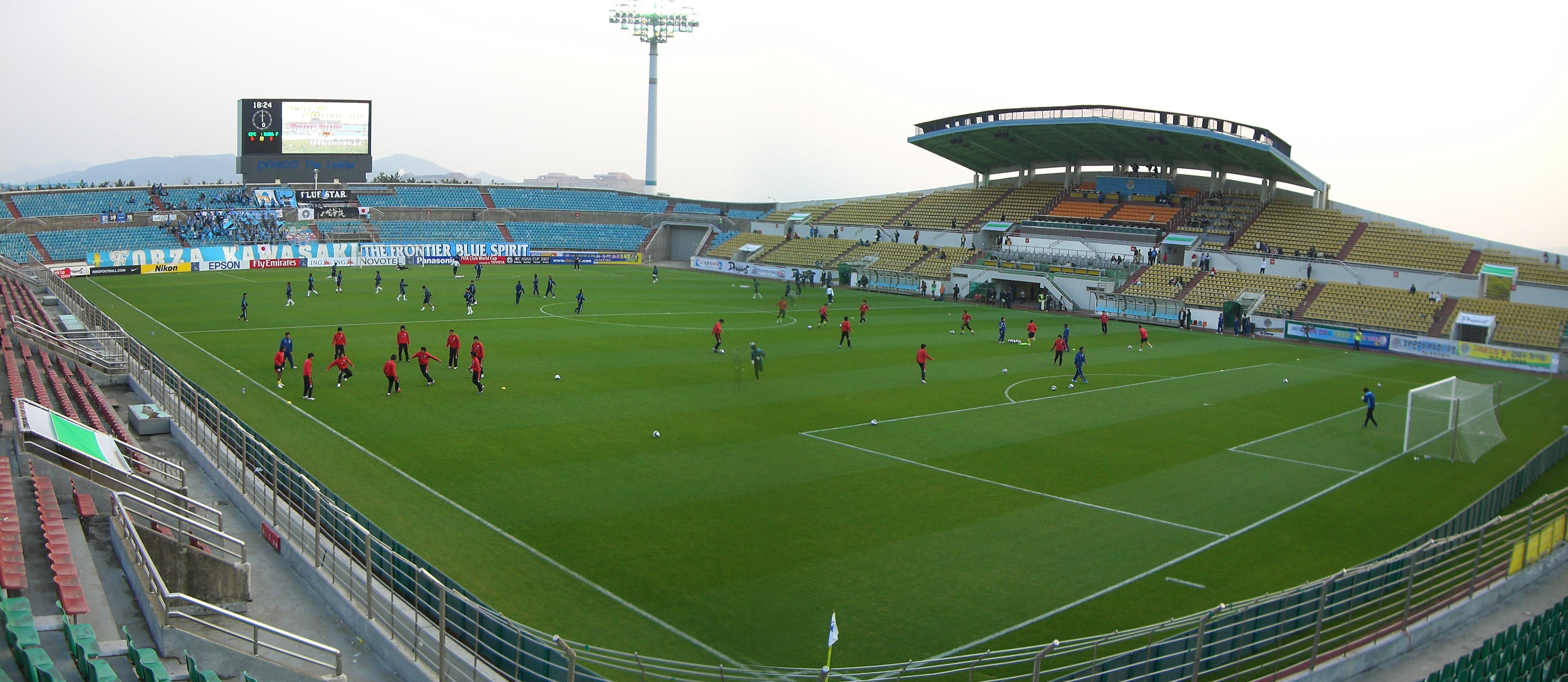
- The stadium on a matchday
- Interactive map of Gwangyang Football Stadium
- Location: Gwangyang, Jeollanam-do, South Korea
- Coordinates: 34.933056°N 127.7275°E
- Owner: City of Gwangyang
- Operator: City of Gwangyang
- Capacity: 13,496
- Surface: Natural grass

Construction
- Groundbreaking: January 1992
- Opened: March 4, 1993

Tenants
- POSCO Atoms (1993–1994); Jeonnam Dragons (1995–present)

The Gwangyang Football Stadium, a.k.a. the Dragon Dungeon, is a football-specific stadium in Gwangyang, South Korea. It is currently used mostly for football matches and is the home stadium of the Jeonnam Dragons. The stadium holds 13,496 spectators. It was built in 1992 and opened in 1993.
