= 2004 Daegu FC season =

Daegu F.C.
2004 season
- Chairmen: Cho Hae-Nyeong (Mayor)
- Manager: Park Jong-Hwan
- K-League: 10th
- FA Cup: Round of 32
- K-League Cup: 9th
- Top goalscorer: League: Nonato (13); All: Nonato (19)
Home colours	Away colours

The 2004 season was Daegu F.C.'s second season in the South Korean K-League.

== Season summary ==
The club's foundation captain, Kim Hak-Cheol, had left Daegu to join the newly formed Incheon United, which was making its K-League debut. Hong Soon-Hak, a midfielder who had played a number of games the previous season, was designated captain. While all of the imports from the previous season bar Indio were released following the conclusion of the club's first season, Nonato and Jefferson, both Brazilian strikers, transferred in. Another Brazilian, Santiago, a central defender, would arrive mid-season. Daegu improved in 2004 to 10th place in the league, which due to Incheon United's entry, now boasted 13 clubs.

The K-League revised its playing structure following the prolonged 2003 season, and now required each club to play home and away matches in two stages (each club playing 12 matches in each stage) against the other participating clubs; the winners of each stage qualifying for a playoff phase along with the top two teams from the overall table. This meant that only 24 regular season games were played. In contrast to the previous season, Daegu had a reasonable offensive record, scoring 30 goals during the season, second only to eventual champion Suwon. Daegu's Brazilian import, Nonato, finished the season as the club's leading scorer (and the K-league's overall runner-up), with 13 goals from 23 appearances. However, the club's defensive record was the worst in the league. Furthermore, in the FA Cup, Daegu were knocked out in the round of 32 by National League side Hallelujah FC.

In the Samsung Hauzen Cup, a new cup competition run as a league competition specifically for K-League clubs (thus excluding National League and lower-tier clubs) during the K-League's mid-season break, Daegu finished 8th out of 13 teams. Nonato again featured prominently on the scorekeeper's chart, being runner-up in goals scored. Nonato would subsequently be loaned to FC Seoul for the 2005 season.

== Squad ==
Note: Flags indicate national team as defined under FIFA eligibility rules; some limited exceptions apply. Players may hold more than one non-FIFA nationality.

No.	Pos.	Nation	Player
1	GK	KOR	Kim Tae-Jin
2	MF	KOR	Nam Young-Youl
3	MF	KOR	Na Hee-Keun
5	DF	KOR	Min Young-Ki
6	DF	KOR	Lee Kyung-Soo
7	MF	BRA	Indio
8	MF	KOR	Song Jung-Hyun
9	FW	BRA	Nonato
11	FW	BRA	Jefferson Feijão
12	FW	KOR	Lee Sang-Il
13	MF	KOR	Kim Kun-Hyung
14	MF	KOR	Yoon Ju-Il
15	DF	KOR	Hwang Tae-Young
16	MF	KOR	Oh Ju-Po
17	MF	KOR	Hong Soon-Hak (captain)
18	FW	KOR	Park Sung-Hong
19	MF	KOR	Jang Hyung-Kwan
20	FW	KOR	Ko Bong-Hyun
21	GK	KOR	Kim Jin-Sik

No.	Pos.	Nation	Player
22	MF	KOR	Ha Eun-Cheol
23	DF	KOR	Kim Duk-Jung
24	DF	KOR	Park Jong-Jin
25	MF	KOR	Choi Han-Wook
26	DF	KOR	Park Kyung-Hwan
27	MF	KOR	Goo Dae-Lyung
28	MF	KOR	Lee Min-Sun
29	FW	KOR	Kim Wan-Soo
30	FW	KOR	Lee Hyun-Dong
31	GK	KOR	Park Jun-Young
32	DF	KOR	Lee Seung-Gun
33	GK	KOR	Song Il-Pyo
34	MF	KOR	Hwang Sun-Pil
35	MF	KOR	Chung Young-Hoon
36	DF	KOR	Song Yoon-Suk
37	FW	KOR	Jin Soon-Jin
38	MF	KOR	Kim Kyung-Il
39	MF	KOR	Yoon Won-Il
40	DF	BRA	Santiago

== Player In/Out ==
=== In ===
Note: Flags indicate national team as defined under FIFA eligibility rules; some limited exceptions apply. Players may hold more than one non-FIFA nationality.

No.	Pos.	Nation	Player
2	MF	KOR	Nam Young-Youl (from Hannam University)
9	FW	BRA	Nonato (from (Brazil) Bahia)
10	MF	BRA	Damilo (from (Brazil) Figueirense)
11	FW	BRA	Jefferson Feijão (from (Brazil) Sport Club Internacional)
15	DF	KOR	Hwang Tae-Young (from Dong-A University)
25	MF	KOR	Choi Han-Wook (from Sunmoon University)
28	MF	KOR	Lee Min-Sun (from Sunmoon University)
29	FW	KOR	Kim Wan-Soo (from Chung-Ang University)
32	DF	KOR	Lee Seung-Gun (from Hannam University)
33	GK	KOR	Song Il-Pyo (from Sunmoon University)
34	MF	KOR	Hwang Sun-Pil (from Chung-Ang University)
5	DF	KOR	Min Young-Ki (from Ulsan Hyundai Horang-i)
35	MF	KOR	Chung Young-Hoon (from Daejeon Citizen)
30	FW	KOR	Lee Hyun-Dong (from Gwangju Sangmu)
36	DF	KOR	Song Yoon-Suk (from Gwangju Sangmu)
37	FW	KOR	Jin Soon-Jin (from Anyang LG Cheetahs)
38	MF	KOR	Kim Kyung-Il (from Chunnam Dragons)
39	MF	KOR	Yoon Won-Il (from Suwon Samsung Bluewings)
40	DF	BRA	Santiago (from (Brazil) CR Vasco da Gama)

=== Out ===
Note: Flags indicate national team as defined under FIFA eligibility rules; some limited exceptions apply. Players may hold more than one non-FIFA nationality.

No.	Pos.	Nation	Player
2	DF	KOR	Kim Hak-Cheol (to Incheon United)
4	MF	KOR	Kang Dae-Hee (Released)
5	DF	TUR	Rahim Zafer (Released)
6	MF	CZE	Roman Gibala (Released)
7	FW	KOR	Kim Ki-Hyun (Released)
9	FW	CZE	Jan Kraus (Released)
11	FW	KOR	Park Byung-Joo (Released)
13	MF	KOR	Kim Kun-Hyung (Released)
15	DF	KOR	Kim Dae-Soo (Released)
25	MF	KOR	Park Sung-Ho (Released)
29	DF	KOR	Song Hong-Sub (Released)
30	DF	BRA	Rogerio Prateat (Released)
32	MF	KOR	Lim Joong-Yong (to Incheon United)
34	FW	KOR	Kim Kwan-Kyu (Released)
35	DF	KOR	Kim Nam-Woo (Released)
10	MF	BRA	Damilo (Released)
41	FW	KOR	Roh Sang-Rae (Retired)

== Statistics ==
No.	Nat.	Pos.	Player	Total		K-League		Korean FA Cup		K-League Cup	
No.	Nat.	Pos.	Player	Apps	Goals	Apps	Goals	Apps	Goals	Apps	Goals
1	GK	(South Korea) KOR	Kim Tae-Jin	35	-47	23	-29	1	0	11	-18
2	MF	(South Korea) KOR	Nam Young-Youl	0	0	0	0	0	0	0	0
3	MF	(South Korea) KOR	Na Hee Keun	13	0	10	0	1	0	2	0
5	DF	(South Korea) KOR	Min Young-Ki	26	0	17	0	1	0	8	0
6	DF	(South Korea) KOR	Lee Kyung-Soo	13	1	8	1	0	0	5	0
7	MF	(Brazil) BRA	Indio	29	1	20	0	0	0	9	1
8	MF	(South Korea) KOR	Song Jung-Hyun	26	1	16	1	1	0	9	0
9	FW	(Brazil) BRA	Nonato	32	19	23	13	0	0	9	6
10	MF	(Brazil) BRA	Damilo	3	0	3	0	0	0	0	0
11	FW	(Brazil) BRA	Jefferson Feijão	29	11	19	5	0	0	10	6
12	FW	(South Korea) KOR	Lee Sang-Il	17	1	11	0	0	0	6	1
13	MF	(South Korea) KOR	Kim Kun-Hyung	5	1	1	0	0	0	4	1
14	MF	(South Korea) KOR	Yoon Ju-Il	30	3	20	2	1	0	9	1
15	DF	(South Korea) KOR	Hwang Tae-Young	0	0	0	0	0	0	0	0
16	MF	(South Korea) KOR	Oh Ju-Po	3	0	2	0	0	0	1	0
17	MF	(South Korea) KOR	Hong Soon-Hak	28	0	18	0	1	0	9	0
18	FW	(South Korea) KOR	Park Sung-Hong	0	0	0	0	0	0	0	0
19	MF	(South Korea) KOR	Jang Hyung-Kwan	3	0	1	0	0	0	2	0
20	FW	(South Korea) KOR	Ko Bong-Hyun	12	2	5	1	1	0	6	1
21	GK	(South Korea) KOR	Kim Jin-Sik	2	-4	1	-2	0	0	1	-2
22	MF	(South Korea) KOR	Ha Eun-Cheol	8	2	5	0	1	1	2	1
23	DF	(South Korea) KOR	Kim Duk-Jung	2	1	2	0	0	0	0	1
24	DF	(South Korea) KOR	Park Jong-Jin	28	0	19	0	1	0	8	0
25	MF	(South Korea) KOR	Choi Han-Wook	5	0	2	0	0	0	3	0
26	DF	(South Korea) KOR	Park Kyung-Hwan	22	0	17	0	0	0	5	0
27	MF	(South Korea) KOR	Goo Dae-Lyung	0	0	0	0	0	0	0	0
28	MF	(South Korea) KOR	Lee Min-Sun	4	0	2	0	0	0	2	0
29	FW	(South Korea) KOR	Kim Wan-Soo	13	0	7	0	1	0	5	0
30	FW	(South Korea) KOR	Lee Hyun-Dong	3	0	3	0	0	0	0	0
31	GK	(South Korea) KOR	Park Jun-Young	0	0	0	0	0	0	0	0
32	DF	(South Korea) KOR	Lee Seung-Gun	22	0	14	0	0	0	8	0
33	GK	(South Korea) KOR	Son Il-Pyo	0	0	0	0	0	0	0	0
34	DF	(South Korea) KOR	Hwang Sun-Pil	21	0	12	0	1	0	8	0
35	MF	(South Korea) KOR	Chung Young-Hoon	7	1	6	1	0	0	1	0
36	DF	(South Korea) KOR	Song Yoon-Suk	0	0	0	0	0	0	0	0
37	FW	(South Korea) KOR	Jin Soon-Jin	28	7	19	4	1	0	8	3
38	MF	(South Korea) KOR	Kim Kyung-Il	7	0	5	0	1	0	1	0
39	MF	(South Korea) KOR	Yoon Won-Il	24	1	16	1	1	0	7	0
40	DF	(Brazil) BRA	Santiago	10	0	8	0	0	0	2	0
41	FW	(South Korea) KOR	Roh Sang-Rae	6	1	4	1	0	0	2	0

== K-League ==
=== Standings ===
Pos	Team	Pld	W	D	L	GF	GA	GD	Pts
9	Seongnam Ilhwa Chunma	24	7	8	9	23	28	−5	29
10	Daegu FC	24	7	7	10	30	31	−1	28
11	Daejeon Citizen	24	6	8	10	18	26	−8	26

Source: RSSSF

Pos	Team	Qualification
1	Suwon Samsung Bluewings (C)	Qualification for the Champions League
2	Pohang Steelers	
3	Ulsan Hyundai Horang-i	
4	Jeonnam Dragons	

Source: RSSSF
(C) Champions

== Korean FA Cup ==
=== Matches ===
Round	Date	Opponents	Ground	Score	Scorers
Round of 32	14 December 2004	Gimpo Helleluja	Tongyeong Stadium	1 - 3	Ha Eun-Cheol 87'

== Hauzen Cup ==
=== Standings ===
Pos	Team	Pld	W	D	L	GF	GA	GD	Pts
7	Pohang Steelers	12	4	3	5	18	15	+3	15
8	Daegu FC	12	2	9	1	21	20	+1	15
9	Incheon United	12	3	6	3	13	14	−1	15

Source: RSSSF

== See also ==
- Daegu F.C.
