= 2005 Daegu FC season =

Daegu F.C.
2005 season
- Chairmen: Jo Hae-Nyung (Mayor)
- Manager: Park Jong-Hwan
- K-League: 8th
- FA Cup: Quarter final
- K-League Cup: 7th
- Top goalscorer: League: Sandro Hiroshi (10); All: Sandro Hiroshi (17)
Home colours	Away colours

The 2005 season was Daegu F.C.'s third season in the South Korean K-League.

== Season summary ==
As with the 2004 season, the 2005 K-League season was split up into first and second stages. Following the conclusion of the first stage, it did not bode well for a successful season for Daegu. They had won a mere 2 games of the first stage, placing the club 12th, ahead of only Gwangju in the first stage table. However, they fared much better for the second stage, winning 6 games, drawing 3, and losing 3. These results placed them third in the second stage table, and this translated into 8th place in the overall table. Their offensive spearhead was Brazilian import, Sandro Hiroshi, brought in for the 2005 season with Nonato and Jefferson having been loaned out for 2005 (to FC Seoul and Seongnam Ilhwa respectively). Hiroshi scored 10 goals from 24 games, which was the equal third highest overall for the season. Jin Soon-Jin finished the season as captain, after Hong Soon-Hak moved to one of Austria's most successful clubs, Grazer AK. Hong would ultimately only play 3 games in two years for his new club, before returning to Korea.

Hiroshi was the leading goal scorer (7 goals) in the Samsung Hauzen Cup, although this didn't translate into sustained success in the competition itself, as Daegu placed only 7th. In the FA Cup, after defeating University and National League sides, Daegu were knocked out in the quarterfinals in a 1–2 loss to another K-League side, the Chunnam Dragons.

== Squad ==
Note: Flags indicate national team as defined under FIFA eligibility rules; some limited exceptions apply. Players may hold more than one non-FIFA nationality.

No.	Pos.	Nation	Player
1	GK	KOR	Kim Tae-Jin
2	DF	KOR	Lee Mun-Sun
3	DF	KOR	Jung Ui-Jun
4	DF	KOR	Lim Ho
5	DF	BRA	Ricardo Da Silva
6	DF	KOR	Min Young-Ki
7	FW	BRA	Marlon
8	MF	KOR	Song Jung-Hyun (vice-captain)
9	FW	BRA	Thiago
10	FW	KOR	Kim Geun-Cheol
11	FW	BRA	Sandro Hiroshi
12	MF	KOR	Lee Sang-Il
13	MF	KOR	Yoon Won-Il
14	MF	KOR	Yoon Ju-Il
15	MF	KOR	Nam Young-Youl
16	MF	KOR	Lee Min-Sun

No.	Pos.	Nation	Player
18	MF	KOR	Na Hee-Keun
20	MF	KOR	Ha Sung-Ryonug
21	GK	KOR	Kim Jin-Sik
22	FW	KOR	Kim Wan-Soo
23	DF	KOR	Lee Seung-Gun
24	DF	KOR	Park Jong-Jin
25	MF	KOR	Yang Hyun-Jung
26	DF	KOR	Choi Sung-Hwan
27	FW	KOR	Kim Woo-Cheol
28	DF	KOR	Choi Seok-Do
29	DF	KOR	Kim Ju-Hwan
30	MF	KOR	Oh Jang-Eun
31	GK	KOR	Park Jun-Young
32	MF	KOR	Song Jeong-Woo
33	FW	KOR	Jin Soon-Jin (captain)
34	MF	KOR	Hwang Sun-Pil
35	MF	KOR	Lim Hyun-Woo

== Player In/Out ==
=== In ===
2	DF	KOR	Lee Mun-Sun (from Dankook University)
3	DF	KOR	Jung Ui-Jun (from Sungkyungwan University)
4	DF	KOR	Lim Ho (from Gangneung City FC)
9	FW	BRA	Thiago (loan from (Brazil) Palmeiras)
10	FW	KOR	Kim Geun-Cheol (from (Japan) Shonan Bellmare)
11	FW	BRA	Sandro Hiroshi (from (Brazil) Guarani)
25	MF	KOR	Yang Hyun-Jung (from Gwangju Sangmu Phoenix)
26	DF	KOR	Choi Sung-Hwan (from Jeonju University)
27	FW	KOR	Kim Woo-Cheol (from Sangji University)
28	DF	KOR	Choi Seok-Do (from Chung-Ang University)
29	DF	KOR	Kim Ju-Hwan (from Ajou University)
30	MF	KOR	Oh Jang-Eun (from (Japan) FC Tokyo)
32	MF	KOR	Song Jeong-Woo (from Ajou University)
20	MF	KOR	Ha Sung-Ryonug (from Gangneung City FC)
5	DF	BRA	Ricardo Da Silva (from (Brazil) Nacional)
7	FW	BRA	Marlon (from (Brazil) Paraná)

=== Out ===
9	FW	BRA	Nonato (loan to FC Seoul)
11	FW	BRA	Jefferson Feijão (loan to Seongnam Ilhwa Chunma)
13	MF	KOR	Kim Kun-Hyung (end of contract)
15	DF	KOR	Hwang Tae-Young (released)
16	MF	KOR	Oh Ju-Po (retired)
18	FW	KOR	Park Sung-Hong (released)
19	MF	KOR	Jang Hyung-Kwan (released)
23	DF	KOR	Kim Duk-Jung (released)
30	FW	KOR	Lee Hyun-Dong (end of contract)
33	GK	KOR	Song Il-Pyo (released)
35	MF	KOR	Chung Young-Hoon (end of contract)
7	MF	BRA	Indio (released)
17	MF	KOR	Hong Soon-Hak (to (Austria) Grazer AK)
20	FW	KOR	Ko Bong-Hyun (released)
25	MF	KOR	Choi Han-Wook (released)
40	DF	BRA	Santiago (end of contract)

== Statistics ==
No.	Nat.	Pos.	Player	Total		K-League		Korean FA Cup		K-League Cup	
No.	Nat.	Pos.	Player	Apps	Goals	Apps	Goals	Apps	Goals	Apps	Goals
1	GK	(South Korea) KOR	Kim Tae-Jin	18	-27	8	-15	0	0	10	-12
2	DF	(South Korea) KOR	Lee Mun-Sun	7	0	4	0	0	0	3	0
3	DF	(South Korea) KOR	Jung Ui-Jun	0	0	0	0	0	0	0	0
4	DF	(South Korea) KOR	Lim Ho	11	0	6	0	0	0	5	0
5	MF	(Brazil) BRA	Ricardo Da Silva	0	0	0	0	0	0	0	0
6	DF	(South Korea) KOR	Min Young-Ki	29	0	18	0	1	0	10	0
7	MF	(Brazil) BRA	Marlon	0	0	0	0	0	0	0	0
8	MF	(South Korea) KOR	Song Jung-Hyun	37	4	22	2	3	1	12	1
9	FW	(Brazil) BRA	Thiago Gentil	32	7	23	4	2	1	7	2
10	MF	(South Korea) KOR	Kim Geun-Cheol	8	0	3	0	1	0	4	0
11	MF	(Brazil) BRA	Sandro Hiroshi	38	17	24	10	2	0	12	7
12	MF	(South Korea) KOR	Lee Sang-Il	15	1	14	1	1	0	0	0
13	MF	(South Korea) KOR	Yoon Won-Il	6	0	6	0	0	0	0	0
14	MF	(South Korea) KOR	Yoon Ju-Il	28	1	14	0	2	0	12	1
15	MF	(South Korea) KOR	Nam Young-Youl	25	1	13	1	1	0	11	0
16	MF	(South Korea) KOR	Lee Min-Sun	0	0	0	0	0	0	0	0
17	MF	(South Korea) KOR	Hong Soon-Hak	26	2	16	2	3	0	7	0
18	MF	(South Korea) KOR	Na Hee Keun	23	1	14	1	2	0	7	0
19	MF	(South Korea) KOR	Lim Hyun-Woo	4	0	1	0	3	0	0	0
20	FW	(South Korea) KOR	Ha Sung-Ryonug	2	1	0	0	2	1	0	0
21	GK	(South Korea) KOR	Kim Jin-Sik	19	-24	15	-17	3	-3	1	-4
22	FW	(South Korea) KOR	Kim Wan-Soo	11	0	5	0	2	0	4	0
23	DF	(South Korea) KOR	Lee Seung-Gun	6	0	2	0	0	0	4	0
24	DF	(South Korea) KOR	Park Jong-Jin	33	0	20	0	3	0	10	0
25	MF	(South Korea) KOR	Yang Hyun-Jung	5	0	1	0	0	0	4	0
26	DF	(South Korea) KOR	Choi Sung-Hwan	18	0	9	0	3	0	6	0
27	FW	(South Korea) KOR	Kim Woo-Cheol	0	0	0	0	0	0	0	0
28	DF	(South Korea) KOR	Choi Seok-Do	3	0	0	0	2	0	1	0
29	DF	(South Korea) KOR	Kim Ju-Hwan	18	1	15	1	3	0	0	0
30	MF	(South Korea) KOR	Oh Jang-Eun	24	4	16	3	1	1	7	0
31	GK	(South Korea) KOR	Park Jun-Young	2	-6	1	-4	0	0	1	-2
32	MF	(South Korea) KOR	Song Jeong-Woo	13	2	12	1	1	1	0	0
33	FW	(South Korea) KOR	Jin Soon-Jin	30	8	17	3	2	1	11	4
34	DF	(South Korea) KOR	Hwang Sun-Pil	14	0	11	0	3	0	0	0
5	DF	(Brazil) BRA	Santiago	17	0	9	0	0	0	8	0
7	MF	(Brazil) BRA	Indio	15	0	10	0	0	0	5	0
19	MF	(South Korea) KOR	Choi Han-Wook	1	0	1	0	0	0	0	0
20	FW	(South Korea) KOR	Ko Bong-Hyun	10	1	6	0	0	0	4	1

== K-League ==
=== Standings ===
Pos	Team	Pld	W	D	L	GF	GA	GD	Pts
7	Daejeon Citizen	24	6	12	6	19	20	−1	30
8	Daegu FC	24	8	6	10	29	36	−7	30
9	Suwon Samsung Bluewings	24	6	10	8	29	32	−3	28

Source: RSSSF

== Korean FA Cup ==
=== Matches ===
Round	Date	Opponents	Ground	Score	Scorers
Round of 32	26 October 2005	Hongik University	N	1 - 0	Ha Sung-Ryong 24'
Round of 16	2 November 2005	Daejeon Hydro & Nuclear Power FC	N	4 - 1	Song Jeong-Woo 13', Thiago 62', Song Jung-Hyun 69', Jin Soon-Jin 77'
Quarterfinals	10 December 2005	Chunnam Dragons	N	1 - 2	Oh Jang-Eun 23'

== Hauzen Cup ==
=== Standings ===
Pos	Team	Pld	W	D	L	GF	GA	GD	Pts
6	Incheon United	12	4	3	5	9	10	−1	15
7	Daegu FC	12	4	3	5	16	18	−2	15
8	Seongnam Ilhwa Chunma	12	3	5	4	9	9	0	14

Source: RSSSF

== See also ==
- Daegu F.C.
