= 2003 Daegu FC season =

Daegu F.C.
2003 season
- Chairmen: Cho Hae-Nyeong (Mayor)
- Manager: Park Jong-Hwan
- K-League: 11th
- FA Cup: Quarter final
- Top goalscorer: League: Jan Kraus, Yoon Ju-Il (5); All: Lee Sang-Il (6)
Home colours	Away colours

The 2003 season was Daegu F.C.'s first season in the South Korean K-League.

== Season summary ==
For its first season, Kim Hak-Cheol was the designated captain, and Daegu brought in two Czech players, Roman Gibala and Jan Kraus for the season. Another import was Turkish player Rahim Zafer, a former Turkish international defender who was in the twilight of his career. Indio transferred in midseason to Daegu from Brazilian club Esporte Clube Santo André. Some of the key Korean foundation players included Lee Sang-il, who had played domestic football in Belgium, and Park Jong-jin who has played all his domestic football with Daegu, bar a two-year spell with Gwangju Sangmu when undertaking his military service. Many of the Korean foundation players came to the club via University Football clubs, which meant that Daegu was their first experience of professional football. The K-League structure for 2003 required each team to play 44 matches, making for a long drawn out season. Daegu ultimately finished their first season 11th (out of 12 teams) in the league, winning 7 games, and drawing 16.

In the 2003 Korean FA Cup, Daegu FC, as participants in the K-League, automatically qualified to the playoff phase (round of 32). However, their wins at this stage of the competition were against National League sides and university club teams. In their quarterfinal match, against their first serious opponent, and fellow K-League club Ulsan Hyundai Horangi, they were knocked out in a 1-nil result.

== Squad ==
Note: Flags indicate national team as defined under FIFA eligibility rules; some limited exceptions apply. Players may hold more than one non-FIFA nationality.

No.	Pos.	Nation	Player
1	GK	KOR	Kim Tae-Jin
2	DF	KOR	Kim Hak-Cheol (captain)
4	MF	KOR	Kang Dae-Hee
5	DF	TUR	Rahim Zafer
6	MF	CZE	Roman Gibala
7	FW	KOR	Kim Ki-Hyun
8	MF	KOR	Song Jung-Hyun
9	FW	CZE	Jan Kraus
10	MF	KOR	Hong Soon-Hak
11	FW	KOR	Park Byung-Joo
12	MF	KOR	Lee Sang-Il
13	MF	KOR	Kim Kun-Hyung
14	MF	KOR	Yoon Ju-Il
15	DF	KOR	Kim Dae-Soo
16	MF	KOR	Oh Ju-Po (vice-captain)
17	MF	KOR	Jang Hyung-Kwan
18	FW	KOR	Park Sung-Hong

No.	Pos.	Nation	Player
20	FW	KOR	Ko Bong-Hyun
21	GK	KOR	Kim Jin-Sik
22	MF	KOR	Ha Eun-Cheol
23	DF	KOR	Kim Duk-Jung
24	DF	KOR	Park Jong-Jin
25	MF	KOR	Park Sung-Ho
26	DF	KOR	Park Kyung-Hwan
27	MF	KOR	Goo Dae-Lyung
28	DF	KOR	Lee Kyung-Soo
29	DF	KOR	Song Hong-Sub
30	DF	BRA	Rogerio Prateat
31	GK	KOR	Park Jun-Young
32	MF	KOR	Lim Joong-Yong
33	MF	BRA	Indio
34	FW	KOR	Kim Kwan-Kyu
35	DF	KOR	Kim Nam-Woo
41	FW	KOR	Roh Sang-Rae

== Players In/Out ==
=== In ===
4	MF	KOR	Kang Dae-Hee (from Suwon Samsung Bluewings)
22	MF	KOR	Ha Eun-Cheol (from Jeonbuk Hyundai Motors)
33	MF	BRA	Indio (from (Brazil) Santo André)

=== Out ===
22	DF	KOR	Chong Dae-Hoon (Released)
33	DF	KOR	Kim Jin-Woo (Released)

== Statistics ==
No.	Nat.	Pos.	Player	Total		K-League		Korean FA Cup	
No.	Nat.	Pos.	Player	Apps	Goals	Apps	Goals	Apps	Goals
1	GK	(South Korea) KOR	Kim Tae-Jin	26	-27	23	-27	3	0
3	DF	(South Korea) KOR	Kim Hak-Cheol	38	0	35	0	3	0
4	MF	(South Korea) KOR	Kang Dae-Hee	4	0	4	0	0	0
5	DF	(Turkey) TUR	Rahim Zafer	14	0	14	0	0	0
6	MF	(Czech Republic) CZE	Roman Gibala	19	1	19	1	0	0
7	FW	(South Korea) KOR	Kim Ki-Hyun	16	0	16	0	0	0
8	MF	(South Korea) KOR	Song Jung-Hyun	40	4	37	3	3	1
9	FW	(Czech Republic) CZE	Jan Kraus	28	5	28	5	0	0
10	MF	(South Korea) KOR	Hong Soon-Hak	17	1	14	1	3	0
11	FW	(South Korea) KOR	Park Byung-Joo	10	0	10	0	0	0
12	MF	(South Korea) KOR	Lee Sang-Il	31	6	28	2	3	4
13	MF	(South Korea) KOR	Kim Kun-Hyung	9	2	8	2	1	0
14	MF	(South Korea) KOR	Yoon Ju-Il	39	5	36	5	3	0
15	DF	(South Korea) KOR	Kim Dae-Soo	11	0	11	0	0	0
16	MF	(South Korea) KOR	Oh Ju-Po	16	1	16	1	0	0
17	MF	(South Korea) KOR	Jang Hyung-Kwan	17	0	14	0	3	0
18	FW	(South Korea) KOR	Park Sung-Hong	29	1	26	0	3	1
20	FW	(South Korea) KOR	Ko Bong-Hyun	18	2	18	2	0	0
21	GK	(South Korea) KOR	Kim Jin-Sik	22	-33	22	-33	0	0
22	MF	(South Korea) KOR	Ha Eun-Cheol	15	4	12	3	3	1
23	DF	(South Korea) KOR	Kim Duk-Jung	32	0	30	0	2	0
24	DF	(South Korea) KOR	Park Jong-Jin	41	0	39	0	2	0
25	MF	(South Korea) KOR	Park Sung-Ho	0	0	0	0	0	0
26	DF	(South Korea) KOR	Park Kyung-Hwan	22	0	19	0	3	0
27	MF	(South Korea) KOR	Goo Dae-Lyung	12	1	10	1	2	0
28	DF	(South Korea) KOR	Lee Kyung-Soo	25	1	22	1	3	0
29	FW	(South Korea) KOR	Song Hong-Sub	4	0	4	0	0	0
30	DF	(Brazil) BRA	Rogerio Prateat	35	2	34	2	1	0
31	GK	(South Korea) KOR	Park Jun-Young	0	0	0	0	0	0
32	MF	(South Korea) KOR	Lim Joong-Yong	17	1	15	1	2	0
33	MF	(Brazil) BRA	Indio	22	3	19	3	3	0
34	FW	(South Korea) KOR	Kim Kwan-Kyu	1	0	1	0	0	0
35	DF	(South Korea) KOR	Kim Nam-Woo	7	0	7	0	0	0
41	FW	(South Korea) KOR	Roh Sang-Rae	21	4	21	4	0	0
22	DF	(South Korea) KOR	Chong Dae-Hoon	0	0	0	0	0	0
33	DF	(South Korea) KOR	Kim Jin-Woo	0	0	0	0	0	0

== K-League ==
=== Standings ===
Pos	Team	Pld	W	D	L	GF	GA	GD	Pts
8	Anyang LG Cheetahs	44	14	14	16	69	68	+1	56
9	Busan I'Cons	44	13	10	21	41	71	−30	49
10	Gwangju Sangmu Bulsajo	44	13	7	24	41	60	−19	46
11	Daegu FC	44	7	16	21	38	60	−22	37
12	Bucheon SK	44	3	12	29	39	73	−34	21

Source: RSSSF

== Korean FA Cup ==
=== Matches ===
(N) = Neutral Ground

Round	Date	Opponents	Ground	Score	Scorers
Round of 32	21 November 2003	Myongji University	N	5 - 2	Lee Sang-Il 6', 9', 38', 56', Song Jung-Hyun 34'
Round of 16	23 November 2003	Konkuk University	N	2 - 1	Park Sung-Hong 24', Ha Eun-Cheol 74'
Quarterfinals	25 December 2003	Ulsan Hyundai Horang-i	N	0 - 1^{(a.e.t.)}

== See also ==
- Daegu F.C.
