= 2004 Korean League Cup =

2004 Samsung Hauzen Cup
Tournament details
- Country: South Korea
- Dates: 11 July – 21 August 2004
- Teams: 13

Final positions
- Champions: Seongnam Ilhwa Chunma (3rd title)
- Runners-up: Daejeon Citizen

Tournament statistics
- Top goal scorer: Zé Carlos (7 goals)

The 2004 Korean League Cup, also known as the 2004 Samsung Hauzen Cup, was the 17th competition of the Korean League Cup.

== Table ==
Pos	Team	Pld	W	D	L	GF	GA	GD	Pts
1	Seongnam Ilhwa Chunma (C)	12	6	4	2	20	14	+6	22
2	Daejeon Citizen	12	5	5	2	16	13	+3	20
3	Suwon Samsung Bluewings	12	4	7	1	14	9	+5	19
4	Jeonbuk Hyundai Motors	12	5	4	3	16	12	+4	19
5	Ulsan Hyundai Horang-i	12	4	5	3	17	13	+4	17
6	Jeonnam Dragons	12	5	1	6	13	17	−4	16
7	Pohang Steelers	12	4	3	5	18	15	+3	15
8	Daegu FC	12	2	9	1	21	20	+1	15
9	Incheon United	12	3	6	3	13	14	−1	15
10	Gwangju Sangmu	12	4	2	6	12	14	−2	14
11	Bucheon SK	12	2	6	4	7	9	−2	12
12	FC Seoul	12	2	4	6	11	18	−7	10
13	Busan I'Cons	12	2	4	6	17	27	−10	10

Source: RSSSF
(C) Champions

== Result ==
July 11

Busan I'Cons	2–2	FC Seoul
Ahn Hyo-yeon 35'; Gaúcho 57'		Jung Jo-gook 20'; Wang Jung-hyun 84'

Busan Asiad Main Stadium
Attendance: 2,588

July 11

Jeonbuk Hyundai Motors	4–1	Jeonnam Dragons
Park Dong-hyuk 9'; Sung Han-soo 27' (o.g.); Roma 39'; Chu Woon-ki 86'		Nam Ki-il 52'

Jeonju World Cup Stadium
Attendance: 5,302

July 11

Daegu FC	2–2	Incheon United
Nonato 50', 89'		Bang Seung-hwan 43', 73'

Daegu World Cup Stadium
Attendance: 8,542

July 11

Bucheon SK	0–0	Pohang Steelers

Bucheon Leports Complex
Attendance: 1,553

July 11

Ulsan Hyundai Horang-i	1–0	Seongnam Ilhwa Chunma
Kim Hyeung-bum 85'

Munsu World Cup Stadium
Attendance: 8,425

July 11

Suwon Samsung Bluewings	1–0	Gwangju Sangmu Bulsajo
Marcel 5'

Suwon World Cup Stadium
Attendance: 13,467

July 15

Jeonbuk Hyundai Motors	2–0	Daejeon Citizen
Roma 36'; Park Dong-hyuk 62'

Jeonju World Cup Stadium
Attendance: 1,042

July 15

Daegu FC	2–1	FC Seoul
Ha Eun-cheul 64' (pen.); Kim Kun-hyung 70'		Wang Jung-hyun 89'

Daegu World Cup Stadium
Attendance: 4,856

July 15

Bucheon SK	3–0	Jeonnam Dragons
Kim Gi-hyung 16'; Kim Gil-sik 48'; Ma Chul-jun 87'

Bucheon Leports Complex
Attendance: 612

July 15

Ulsan Hyundai Horang-i	1–1	Incheon United
Jang Sang-won 27'		Bang Seung-hwan 20'

Masan Stadium
Attendance: 13,428

July 15

Suwon Samsung Bluewings	3–2	Pohang Steelers
Nádson 24'; Kim Dae-eui 67'; Marcel 90'		Petreski 33' (pen.); Nam Ik-kyung 81'

Suwon World Cup Stadium
Attendance: 8,367

July 15

Gwangju Sangmu Bulsajo	1–1	Seongnam Ilhwa Chunma
Kim Byung-chae 69'		Do Jae-jun 33'

Gwangju World Cup Stadium
Attendance: 1,352

July 18

Seongnam Ilhwa Chunma	2–2	Suwon Samsung Bluewings
Kim Do-hoon 14' (pen.), 74'		Kim Dae-eui 7'; Nádson 21'

Seongnam 2 Stadium
Attendance: 6,253

July 18

Pohang Steelers	3–1	Ulsan Hyundai Horang-i
Hwang Ji-soo 68'; Hwang Jae-won 75'; Zé Carlos 90'		Kim Jin-yong 35'

Steelyard Stadium
Attendance: 10,521

July 18

Incheon United	0–0	Bucheon SK

Incheon Munhak Stadium Substadium
Attendance: 5,287

July 18

Jeonnam Dragons	2–1	Daegu FC
Hong Seong-yo 72'; Julinho 75'		Yun Ju-il 66'

Gwangyang Football Stadium
Attendance: 8,245

July 18

FC Seoul	2–0	Jeonbuk Hyundai Motors
Jung Jo-gook 45+', 90'

Seoul World Cup Stadium
Attendance: 6,236

July 18

Daejeon Citizen	6–4	Busan I'Cons
Han Jeong-guk 1'; Gong O-kyun 12'; Luciano Valente 60'; Alison 61'; Kim Jong-hyun 71', 89'		Han Jeong-guk 22' (o.g.); Lee Sung-jae 62'; Noh Jung-yoon 77'; Gaúcho 85'

Daejeon World Cup Stadium
Attendance: 17,675

July 22

Busan I'Cons	2–1	Incheon United
Do Hwa-sung 8'; Lee Jung-hyo 60'		Manić 53'

Busan Asiad Main Stadium
Attendance: 1,218

July 22

Jeonbuk Hyundai Motors	1–0	Pohang Steelers
Kim Gyeong-ryang 40'

Jeonju World Cup Stadium
Attendance: 3,892

July 22

Daegu FC	2–2	Seongnam Ilhwa Chunma
Nonato 19' (pen.); Jefferson Feijão 28'		Irineu 56'; Kim Do-hoon 90+' (pen.)

Daegu World Cup Stadium
Attendance: 4,835

July 22

Bucheon SK	1–0	Gwangju Sangmu Bulsajo
Kim Gi-hyung 3'

Bucheon Leports Complex
Attendance: 1,012

July 22

Ulsan Hyundai Horang-i	1–1	Suwon Samsung Bluewings
Lee Yun-seop 24'		Park Kun-ha 3'

Changwon Civil Stadium
Attendance: 22,315

July 22

Daejeon Citizen	2–1	Jeonnam Dragons
Luciano Valente 31'; Gong O-kyun 52'		Shin Byung-ho 39'

Daejeon World Cup Stadium
Attendance: 11,123

July 25

Suwon Samsung Bluewings	3–1	Bucheon SK
Kim Dae-eui 20'; Marcel 86'; Kim Dong-hyun 90+7'		Lee Kil-yong 90+1'

Suwon World Cup Stadium
Attendance: 25,311

July 25

Gwangju Sangmu Bulsajo	2–2	Daegu FC
Park Jung-hwan 35', 46'		Jefferson Feijão 64', 77'

Gwangju World Cup Stadium
Attendance: 1,783

July 25

Seongnam Ilhwa Chunma	1–2	Jeonbuk Hyundai Motors
Kim Hyun-su 25' (o.g.)		Son Jeong-tak 62'; Choi Yeong-hun 87'

Seongnam 2 Stadium
Attendance: 4,235

July 25

Pohang Steelers	2–1	Busan I'Cons
Hwang Jae-won 57'; Kang Yong 75'		Cooke 45'

Steelyard Stadium
Attendance: 4,831

July 25

Incheon United	1–1	Daejeon Citizen
Manić 1'		Luciano Valente 21' (pen.)

Incheon Munhak Stadium Substadium
Attendance: 6,118

July 25

Jeonnam Dragons	0–0	FC Seoul

Gwangyang Football Stadium
Attendance: 7,256

July 28

Gwangju Sangmu Bulsajo	1–0	Ulsan Hyundai Horang-i
Kim Sang-sik 34'

Gwangju World Cup Stadium
Attendance: 1,657

July 28

Seongnam Ilhwa Chunma	1–1	Bucheon SK
Kim Do-hoon 20'		Kim Gi-hyung 55' (pen.)

Seongnam 2 Stadium
Attendance: 2,020

July 28

Pohang Steelers	1–2	Daegu FC
Kim Gi-dong 58'		Indio 51' (pen.); Jefferson Feijão 89'

Steelyard Stadium
Attendance: 4,381

July 28

Incheon United	2–1	Jeonbuk Hyundai Motors
Kim Chi-woo 26'; Manić 80'		André Gomes 45'

Incheon Munhak Stadium Substadium
Attendance: 3,052

July 28

Jeonnam Dragons	2–3	Busan I'Cons
Itamar 15', 77' (pen.)		Cooke 22'; Noh Jung-yoon 70'; Yun Hui-jun 80'

Gwangyang Football Stadium
Attendance: 3,876

July 28

FC Seoul	1–2	Daejeon Citizen
Jung Jo-gook 33'		Gong O-kyun 39'; Lee Kwan-woo 90'

Seoul World Cup Stadium
Attendance: 3,527

August 1

Busan I'Cons	0–2	Seongnam Ilhwa Chunma
		Dudu 49'; Marcelo Macedo 75'

Busan Asiad Main Stadium
Attendance: 981

August 1

Jeonbuk Hyundai Motors	0–1	Gwangju Sangmu Bulsajo
		Park Jong-woo 88'

Jeonju World Cup Stadium
Attendance: 16,302

August 1

Daegu FC	1–1	Suwon Samsung Bluewings
Jefferson Feijão 12'		Marcel 34'

Daegu World Cup Stadium
Attendance: 12,365

August 1

Bucheon SK	0–2	Ulsan Hyundai Horang-i
		Zé Carlos 36', 42'

Bucheon Stadium
Attendance: 1,524

August 1

FC Seoul	0–1	Incheon United
		Maezono 46' (pen.)

Seoul World Cup Stadium
Attendance: 5,274

August 1

Daejeon Citizen	1–1	Pohang Steelers
Ju Seung-jin 77'		Zé Carlos 15'

Daejeon World Cup Stadium
Attendance: 13,653

August 4

Bucheon SK	0–1	Jeonbuk Hyundai Motors
		Park Dong-hyuk 84' (pen.)

Bucheon Stadium
Attendance: 1,572

August 4

Ulsan Hyundai Horang-i	5–2	Busan I'Cons
Souza 45'; Yoo Kyoung-youl 53'; Zé Carlos 60', 65', 70'		Noh Jung-yoon 9'; Ahn Hyo-yeon 27'

Munsu World Cup Stadium
Attendance: 7,865

August 4

Suwon Samsung Bluewings	0–0	Daejeon Citizen

Suwon World Cup Stadium
Attendance: 22,136

August 4

Gwangju Sangmu Bulsajo	2–3	FC Seoul
Seo Dong-won 22'; Park Jong-woo 59'		Fumagalli 11'; Jung Jo-gook 29' (pen.); Rinaldo 44'

Gwangju World Cup Stadium
Attendance: 2,573

August 4

Seongnam Ilhwa Chunma	2–1	Jeonnam Dragons
Dudu 70'; Shin Tae-yong 74' (pen.)		Itamar 48'

Seongnam 2 Stadium
Attendance: 3,240

August 4

Pohang Steelers	1–1	Incheon United
Petreski 19'		Manić 76'

Steelyard Stadium
Attendance: 8,026

August 8

Busan I'Cons	0–0	Bucheon SK

Busan Asiad Main Stadium
Attendance: 1,517

August 8

Jeonbuk Hyundai Motors	2–2	Daegu FC
Botti 15'; Choi Jin-cheul 90+2'		Nonato 6', 56'

Jeonju World Cup Stadium
Attendance: 14,702

August 8

Incheon United	2–4	Seongnam Ilhwa Chunma
Hwang Yeon-seok 40'; Manić 87' (pen.)		Shin Tae-yong 19'; Dudu 64'; Marcelo Macedo 81'; Jang Dong-hyun 84'

Incheon Munhak Stadium substadium
Attendance: 5,827

August 8

Jeonnam Dragons	2–0	Gwangju Sangmu Bulsajo
Kim Jung-kyum 22'; Itamar 28' (pen.)

Gwangyang Football Stadium
Attendance: 7,456

August 8

FC Seoul	0–0	Suwon Samsung Bluewings

Seoul World Cup Stadium
Attendance: 14,823

August 8

Daejeon Citizen	0–0	Ulsan Hyundai Horang-i

Daejeon World Cup Stadium
Attendance: 15,172

August 11

Busan I'Cons	0–0	Jeonbuk Hyundai Motors

Busan Asiad Main Stadium
Attendance: 728

August 11

Pohang Steelers	2–1	Gwangju Sangmu Bulsajo
Hwang Jin-sung 11'; Moon Min-kui 32'		Kim Seung-hyun 50'

Steelyard Stadium
Attendance: 5,289

August 11

Incheon United	0–0	Suwon Samsung Bluewings

Incheon Munhak Stadium substadium
Attendance: 5,632

August 11

Jeonnam Dragons	1–0	Ulsan Hyundai Horang-i
Kim Jin-kyu 53'

Gwangyang Football Stadium
Attendance: 5,786

August 11

FC Seoul	0–0	Bucheon SK

Seoul World Cup Stadium
Attendance: 4,598

August 11

Daejeon Citizen	2–2	Daegu FC
Jeong Shung-hoon 8', 78'		Go Bong-hyeon 18'; Jin Sun-jin 83'

Daejeon World Cup Stadium
Attendance: 11,456

August 14

Daegu FC	2–2	Busan I'Cons
Nonato 11' (pen.); Lee Sang-il 39'		Adriano Magrão 49'; Kim Tae-min 60'

Daegu World Cup Stadium
Attendance: 7,853

August 14

Bucheon SK	0–1	Daejeon Citizen
		Kim Jong-hyun 83'

Bucheon Stadium
Attendance: 1,751

August 14

Ulsan Hyundai Horang-i	2–0	FC Seoul
Dodô 7' (pen.); Šimić 58'

Munsu World Cup Stadium
Attendance: 4,315

August 14

Suwon Samsung Bluewings	0–1	Jeonnam Dragons
		No Byung-jun 90'

Suwon World Cup Stadium
Attendance: 20,317

August 14

Gwangju Sangmu Bulsajo	1–0	Incheon United
Lee Dong-gook 48'

Gwangju World Cup Stadium
Attendance: 3,527

August 14

Seongnam Ilhwa Chunma	2–1	Pohang Steelers
Dudu 39'; Marcelo Macedo 42'		Lee Min-sung 90+2'

Seongnam 2 Stadium
Attendance: 4,234

August 18

Busan I'Cons	0–2	Suwon Samsung Bluewings
		Kim Dae-eui 30'; Urumov 62'

Busan Asiad Main Stadium
Attendance: 1,823

August 18

Jeonbuk Hyundai Motors	2–2	Ulsan Hyundai Horang-i
Rink 56'; Park Dong-hyuk 78' (pen.)		Dodô 54'; Zé Carlos 61'

Jeonju World Cup Stadium
Attendance: 1,103

August 18

Daegu FC	1–1	Bucheon SK
Jin Sun-jin 55'		Irineu 18'

Daegu World Cup Stadium
Attendance: 2,875

August 18

FC Seoul	1–2	Seongnam Ilhwa Chunma
Fumagalli 14'		Dudu 43', 82'

Seoul World Cup Stadium
Attendance: 4,718

August 18

Daejeon Citizen	1–0	Gwangju Sangmu Bulsajo
Lee Kwan-woo 87' (pen.)

Daejeon World Cup Stadium
Attendance: 5,684

August 19

Jeonnam Dragons	1–0	Pohang Steelers
Baek Ji-hoon 70'

Gwangyang Football Stadium
Attendance: 1,240

August 21

Ulsan Hyundai Horang-i	2–2	Daegu FC
Kim Jin-yong 44'; Zé Carlos 60'		Jin Sun-jin 75'; Jefferson Feijão 87'

Munsu World Cup Stadium
Attendance: 4,425

August 21

Suwon Samsung Bluewings	1–1	Jeonbuk Hyundai Motors
Jo Sung-hwan 78'		Son Jeong-tak 39'

Suwon World Cup Stadium
Attendance: 21,362

August 21

Gwangju Sangmu Bulsajo	3–1	Busan I'Cons
Lee Dong-gook 21', 25'; Park Sung-bae 51'		Lee Sung-jae 70'

Gwangju World Cup Stadium
Attendance: 1,853

August 21

Seongnam Ilhwa Chunma	1–0	Daejeon Citizen
Kim Do-hoon 90+1'

Seongnam 2 Stadium
Attendance: 4,252

August 21

Pohang Steelers	5–1	FC Seoul
Oh Beom-seok 21'; Hwang Jin-sung 47'; Petreski 60', 84', 90' (pen.)		Jung Jo-gook 90+4' (pen.)

Steelyard Stadium
Attendance: 6,871

August 21

Incheon United	2–1	Jeonnam Dragons
Lee Yong-ha 11'; Manić 57' (pen.)		Itamar 49'

Incheon Munhak Stadium substadium
Attendance: 4,211

== Top scorers ==
Rank	Player	Club	Goals	Apps
1	(Brazil) Zé Carlos	Ulsan Hyundai Horang-i	7	7
2	(Brazil) Dudu	Seongnam Ilhwa Chunma	6	6
2	(Brazil) Nonato	Daegu FC	6	9
2	(Serbia and Montenegro) Radivoje Manić	Incheon United	6	9
2	(Brazil) Jefferson Feijão	Daegu FC	6	10
2	(South Korea) Jung Jo-gook	FC Seoul	6	12
7	(South Korea) Kim Do-hoon	Seongnam Ilhwa Chunma	5	9
7	(Brazil) Itamar	Jeonnam Dragons	5	9
7	(North Macedonia) Goran Petreski	Pohang Steelers	5	11
10	(South Korea) Park Dong-hyuk	Jeonbuk Hyundai Motors	4	9
10	(South Korea) Kim Dae-eui	Suwon Samsung Bluewings	4	10
10	(Brazil) Marcel	Suwon Samsung Bluewings	4	10

== Awards ==
Award	Player	Team	Points
Top goalscorer	(Brazil) Zé Carlos	Ulsan Hyundai Horang-i	7 goals
Top assist provider	(Brazil) André Luiz Tavares	Pohang Steelers	5 assists

== See also ==
- 2004 in South Korean football
- 2004 K League
- 2004 Korean FA Cup
