= 2004 K League Championship =

Tournament details
- Host country: South Korea
- Dates: 5–12 December 2004
- Teams: 4

Final positions
- Champions: Suwon Samsung Bluewings
- Runners-up: Pohang Steelers

Tournament statistics
- Matches played: 4
- Goals scored: 2 (0.5 per match)
- Attendance: 96,378 (24,095 per match)
- Top scorer(s): Tavares; Javier Martín Musa (1 goal each)

The 2004 K League Championship was the eighth competition of the K League Championship, and was held to decide the 22nd champions of the K League. After the regular season was finished, the first stage winners, the second stage winners, and the top two clubs in the overall table qualified for the championship. Each semi-final was played as a single match, and the final consisted of two matches.

== Qualified teams ==
Club	Placement
Pohang Steelers	First stage winners
Suwon Samsung Bluewings	Second stage winners Overall table 2nd place
Ulsan Hyundai Horang-i	Overall table 1st place
Jeonnam Dragons	Overall table 3rd place

== Bracket ==
Semi-finals
Suwon Samsung Bluewings	1
Jeonnam Dragons	0
Pohang Steelers	1
Ulsan Hyundai Horang-i	0

Final
Suwon Samsung Bluewings (p)	0	0	0 (4)
Pohang Steelers	0	0	0 (3)

== Semi-finals ==
=== Pohang vs Ulsan ===
5 December 2004
15:00 KST

Pohang Steelers	1–0	Ulsan Hyundai Horang-i
Tavares 36'	Report

Pohang Steel Yard, Pohang
Attendance: 18,237
Referee: Helmut Fleischer (Germany)

Pohang Steelers	Ulsan Hyundai Horang-i

GK	1	(South Korea) Kim Byung-ji
DF	5	(South Korea) Lee Min-sung
DF	4	(Brazil) Rogério Pinheiro	(yellow card) 4'
DF	14	(South Korea) Kim Sung-keun
MF	17	(South Korea) Moon Min-kui
MF	6	(South Korea) Kim Gi-dong		(substituted off) 84'
MF	2	(South Korea) Nam Young-hun		(substituted off) 62'
MF	23	(South Korea) Hwang Ji-soo
MF	32	(South Korea) Oh Beom-seok
FW	22	(South Korea) Woo Sung-yong
FW	10	(Brazil) Tavares		(substituted off) 90+1'
Substitutes:
GK	31	(South Korea) Shin Hwa-yong
DF	12	(South Korea) Kang Yong		(substituted on) 62'
DF	33	(South Korea) Park Won-jae
MF	8	(South Korea) Hwang Jin-sung
FW	9	(North Macedonia) Goran Petreski		(substituted on) 84'
FW	19	(South Korea) Nam Ik-kyung		(substituted on) 90+1'
Manager:
(South Korea) Choi Soon-ho

GK	1	(South Korea) Seo Dong-myung
DF	2	(South Korea) Park Jin-sub
DF	4	(South Korea) Cho Se-kwon
DF	5	(South Korea) Yoo Kyoung-youl
DF	13	(South Korea) Hyun Young-min	(yellow card) ?'
MF	23	(South Korea) Byun Sung-hwan	(yellow card) 54'	(substituted off) 57'
MF	22	(South Korea) Lee Ho
MF	7	(South Korea) Kim Jung-woo		(substituted off) 83'
MF	46	(Brazil) Daniel Mendes		(substituted off) 69'
FW	11	(South Korea) Choi Sung-kuk
FW	15	(Brazil) Zé Carlos	(yellow card) 43'
Substitutes:
GK	31	(South Korea) Choi Moo-lim
MF	14	(South Korea) Jang Sang-won
MF	17	(South Korea) Chun Jae-woon		(substituted on) 83'
MF	28	(South Korea) Kim Dong-kyu
FW	6	(Brazil) Santana Souza		(substituted on) 57'
FW	18	(South Korea) Kim Jin-yong		(substituted on) 69'
Manager:
(South Korea) Kim Jung-nam

Assistant referees:
Kim Sun-jin (South Korea)
Won Chang-ho (South Korea)
Fourth official:
Park Jong-gyu (South Korea)

=== Suwon vs Jeonnam ===
5 December 2004
15:00 KST

Suwon Samsung Bluewings	1–0	Jeonnam Dragons
Musa 4'	Report

Suwon World Cup Stadium, Suwon
Attendance: 26,445
Referee: Hermann Albrecht (Germany)

Suwon Samsung Bluewings	Jeonnam Dragons

GK	1	(South Korea) Lee Woon-jae
DF	29	(South Korea) Kwak Hee-ju	(yellow card) 20'
DF	18	(South Korea) Park Kun-ha	(yellow card) 42'
DF	6	(Argentina) Javier Martín Musa
MF	20	(South Korea) Choi Sung-yong
MF	4	(South Korea) Kim Do-heon
MF	7	(South Korea) Kim Jin-woo
MF	14	(South Korea) Seo Jung-won
FW	12	(Brazil) Nádson	(yellow card) 72'	(substituted off) 79'
FW	11	(South Korea) Kim Dae-eui
FW	9	(Brazil) Marcel
Substitutes:
GK	21	(South Korea) Kim Dae-hwan
DF	2	(South Korea) Cho Byung-kuk
DF	5	(South Korea) Cho Sung-hwan
MF	3	(South Korea) Lee Byung-keun
FW	27	(South Korea) Kim Dong-hyun		(substituted on) 79'
FW	44	(Serbia and Montenegro) Zoran Urumov
Manager:
(South Korea) Cha Bum-kun

GK	41	(South Korea) Kim Young-kwang
DF	3	(South Korea) Yoo Sang-soo
DF	7	(South Korea) Kim Tae-young
DF	36	(South Korea) Kim Jin-kyu
MF	14	(South Korea) Kim Hyo-il
MF	17	(South Korea) Kim Hong-chul
MF	19	(South Korea) Nam Ki-il		(substituted off) 79'
MF	13	(South Korea) Kim Jung-kyum
FW	27	(South Korea) Kim Tae-su		(substituted off) 45'
FW	11	(Brazil) Mota	(yellow card) 66'
FW	18	(Brazil) Itamar	(yellow card) 48'
Substitutes:
GK	1	(South Korea) Park Jong-mun
DF	4	(South Korea) Lee Chang-won
DF	29	(South Korea) Kim Ho-yoo
MF	23	(South Korea) Lee Jung-woon
FW	22	(South Korea) No Byung-jun		(substituted on) 45'
FW	30	(South Korea) Ju Kwang-youn		(substituted on) 79'
Manager:
(South Korea) Lee Jang-soo

Assistant referees:
Kim Ke-soo (South Korea)
An Sang-ki (South Korea)
Fourth official:
Lee Jong-kuk (South Korea)

== Final ==
=== First leg ===
8 December 2004
19:00 KST

Pohang Steelers	0–0	Suwon Samsung Bluewings
	Report

Pohang Steel Yard, Pohang
Attendance: 15,206
Referee: Hermann Albrecht (Germany)

Pohang Steelers	Suwon Samsung Bluewings

GK	1	(South Korea) Kim Byung-ji
DF	5	(South Korea) Lee Min-sung
DF	4	(Brazil) Rogério Pinheiro
DF	14	(South Korea) Kim Sung-keun
DF	32	(South Korea) Oh Beom-seok
MF	17	(South Korea) Moon Min-kui
MF	6	(South Korea) Kim Gi-dong	(substituted off) 57'
MF	2	(South Korea) Nam Young-hun	(substituted off) 45'
MF	23	(South Korea) Hwang Ji-soo
FW	22	(South Korea) Woo Sung-yong
FW	10	(Brazil) Tavares	(substituted off) 85'
Substitutes:
GK	31	(South Korea) Shin Hwa-yong
DF	12	(South Korea) Kang Yong	(substituted on) 45'
DF	33	(South Korea) Park Won-jae
MF	8	(South Korea) Hwang Jin-sung
FW	9	(North Macedonia) Goran Petreski	(substituted on) 57'
FW	19	(South Korea) Nam Ik-kyung	(substituted on) 85'
Manager:
(South Korea) Choi Soon-ho

GK	1	(South Korea) Lee Woon-jae
DF	29	(South Korea) Kwak Hee-ju
DF	18	(South Korea) Park Kun-ha
DF	6	(Argentina) Javier Martín Musa
MF	20	(South Korea) Choi Sung-yong	(yellow card) 83'
MF	4	(South Korea) Kim Do-heon
MF	7	(South Korea) Kim Jin-woo		(substituted off) 84'
MF	14	(South Korea) Seo Jung-won		(substituted off) 63'
FW	12	(Brazil) Nádson
FW	11	(South Korea) Kim Dae-eui
FW	9	(Brazil) Marcel		(substituted off) 76'
Substitutes:
GK	21	(South Korea) Kim Dae-hwan
DF	2	(South Korea) Cho Byung-kuk
DF	5	(South Korea) Cho Sung-hwan		(substituted on) 63'
MF	3	(South Korea) Lee Byung-keun
FW	27	(South Korea) Kim Dong-hyun		(substituted on) 76'
FW	44	(Serbia and Montenegro) Zoran Urumov		(substituted on) 84'
Manager:
(South Korea) Cha Bum-kun

Assistant referees:
Lee Young-chul (South Korea)
Kang Chang-gu (South Korea)
Fourth official:
Choi Gwang-bo (South Korea)

=== Second leg ===
12 December 2004
15:00 KST

Suwon Samsung Bluewings	0–0 (a.e.t.)	Pohang Steelers
	Report
Penalties
Marcel (penalty scored); Choi Sung-yong (penalty scored); Kim Do-heon (penalty scored); Kim Jin-woo (penalty missed); Urumov (penalty scored)	4–3	(penalty scored) Woo Sung-yong; (penalty scored) Rogério Pinheiro; (penalty missed) Lee Min-sung; (penalty scored) Petreski; (penalty missed) Kim Byung-ji

Suwon World Cup Stadium, Suwon
Attendance: 36,490
Referee: Helmut Fleischer (Germany)

Suwon Samsung Bluewings	Pohang Steelers

GK	1	(South Korea) Lee Woon-jae
DF	29	(South Korea) Kwak Hee-ju	(yellow card) 40'
DF	5	(South Korea) Cho Sung-hwan
DF	6	(Argentina) Javier Martín Musa		(substituted off) 117'
MF	20	(South Korea) Choi Sung-yong
MF	4	(South Korea) Kim Do-Heon	Booked
MF	7	(South Korea) Kim Jin-woo
MF	3	(South Korea) Lee Byung-keun		(substituted off) 64'
FW	12	(Brazil) Nádson		(substituted off) 68'
FW	11	(South Korea) Kim Dae-eui
FW	9	(Brazil) Marcel	Booked
Substitutes:
GK	21	(South Korea) Kim Dae-hwan
DF	2	(South Korea) Cho Byung-kuk
DF	18	(South Korea) Park Kun-ha		(substituted on) 117'
MF	14	(South Korea) Seo Jung-won		(substituted on) 64' (substituted off) 109'
FW	27	(South Korea) Kim Dong-hyun		(substituted on) 68'
FW	44	(Serbia and Montenegro) Zoran Urumov	Booked	(substituted on) 109'
Manager:
(South Korea) Cha Bum-kun

GK	1	(South Korea) Kim Byung-ji
DF	5	(South Korea) Lee Min-sung
DF	4	(Brazil) Rogério Pinheiro
DF	14	(South Korea) Kim Sung-keun
DF	32	(South Korea) Oh Beom-seok
MF	17	(South Korea) Moon Min-kui	(substituted off) 118'
MF	12	(South Korea) Kang Yong	(substituted off) 83'
MF	23	(South Korea) Hwang Ji-soo	(substituted off) 60'
MF	10	(Brazil) Tavares	(substituted off) 109'
FW	9	(North Macedonia) Goran Petreski
FW	22	(South Korea) Woo Sung-yong
Substitutes:
GK	31	(South Korea) Shin Hwa-yong
DF	33	(South Korea) Park Won-jae	(substituted on) 118'
MF	6	(South Korea) Kim Gi-dong	(substituted on) 60'
MF	2	(South Korea) Nam Young-hun	(substituted on) 83'
MF	8	(South Korea) Hwang Jin-sung
FW	19	(South Korea) Nam Ik-kyung	(substituted on) 109'
Manager:
(South Korea) Choi Soon-ho

Assistant referees:
Won Chang-ho (South Korea)
Kim Kye-su (South Korea)
Fourth official:
Kim Sung-ho (South Korea)

0–0 on aggregate. Suwon Samsung Bluewings won 4–3 on penalties.

== Final table ==
Pos	Team	Qualification
1	Suwon Samsung Bluewings (C)	Qualification for the Champions League
2	Pohang Steelers	
3	Ulsan Hyundai Horang-i	
4	Jeonnam Dragons	

Source: RSSSF
(C) Champions

== See also ==
- 2004 K League
