= 2006 Korean FA Cup final =

- Event: 2006 Korean FA Cup
Suwon Samsung Bluewings	Jeonnam Dragons
0	2
- Date: 3 December 2006
- Venue: Seoul World Cup Stadium, Seoul
- Man of the Match: Kim Hyo-il (Jeonnam Dragons)
- Referee: Lee Ki-young
- Attendance: 10,889

The 2006 Korean FA Cup final was a football match played on 3 December 2006 at Seoul World Cup Stadium in Seoul that decided the champions of the 2006 Korean FA Cup. It was contested between Suwon Samsung Bluewings and Jeonnam Dragons, and kicked off at 15:00 (KST).

== Road to the final ==
Suwon Samsung Bluewings		Round	Jeonnam Dragons	
Opponent	Result	Round	Opponent	Result
Soongsil University (H)	2–0	Round of 32	Hannam University (H)	2–1
Daejeon Citizen (H)	1–1 (4–2 p)	Round of 16	Busan IPark (H)	1–0
FC Seoul (A)	2–2 (6–5 p)	Quarter-finals	Daegu FC (H)	2–0
Goyang Kookmin Bank (N)	2–0	Semi-finals	Incheon United (N)	0–0 (4–3 p)

== Details ==
3 December 2006
15:00 KST

Suwon Samsung Bluewings	0–2	Jeonnam Dragons
		Song Jung-hyun 56'; Kim Tae-su 85'

Seoul World Cup Stadium, Seoul
Attendance: 10,889
Referee: Lee Ki-young

Suwon Samsung Bluewings	Jeonnam Dragons

GK	1	(South Korea) Lee Woon-jae
RB	29	(South Korea) Kwak Hee-ju
CB	2	(Croatia) Mato Neretljak
CB	15	(South Korea) Lee Sa-vik	(yellow card) 31'
LB	8	(South Korea) Song Chong-gug		(substituted off) 46'
DM	5	(South Korea) Kim Nam-il (c)
CM	7	(South Korea) Kim Jin-woo
CM	13	(South Korea) Lee Kwan-woo	(yellow card) 47'	(substituted off) 70'
RW	10	(Brazil) Elpídio Silva	(yellow card) 42'
LW	11	(South Korea) Kim Dae-eui
CF	9	(Uruguay) Juan Manuel Olivera		(substituted off) 46*'
Substitutes:
MF	22	(South Korea) Lee Hyun-jin		(substituted on) 46'
FW	14	(South Korea) Shin Young-rok		(substituted on) 46*'
FW	33	(Russia) Denis Laktionov		(substituted on) 70'
Manager:
(South Korea) Cha Bum-kun

GK	21	(South Korea) Yeom Dong-gyun	(yellow card) 84'
CB	5	(South Korea) Park Jae-hong
CB	22	(South Korea) Lee Dong-won
CB	17	(South Korea) Lee Jun-ki
RM	28	(South Korea) Yang Sang-min
CM	14	(South Korea) Kim Hyo-il (c)
CM	8	(South Korea) Kim Tae-su
LM	44	(South Korea) Park Jong-woo
AM	9	(South Korea) Song Jung-hyun		(substituted off) 88'
CF	51	(Brazil) Sandro Cardoso		(substituted off) 68'
CF	20	(South Korea) Lee Gwang-jae	(yellow card) 43'	(substituted off) 55'
Substitutes:
DF	3	(South Korea) Yoo Sang-soo		(substituted on) 68'
DF	15	(South Korea) Yoon Hee-jun		(substituted on) 88'
FW	11	(Brazil) Sandro Hiroshi		(substituted on) 55'
Manager:
(South Korea) Huh Jung-moo

Man of the Match:
Kim Hyo-il (Jeonnam Dragons)

Assistant referees:
Kim Seon-jin
Kim Hyun-gu

Match rules

- 90 minutes
- 30 minutes of extra time if necessary
- Penalty shoot-out if scores still level
- Seven named substitutes
- Maximum of three substitutions

== See also ==
- 2006 Korean FA Cup
