= Jefferson Feijão =

Jefferson Feijao may refer to:

- Jefferson Feijão (footballer, born 1978), Jefferson Marques da Conceição, Brazilian forward
- Jefferson Feijão (footballer, born 1986), Jefferson da Silva Luciano, Brazilian right back

== See also ==
- Jefferson (given name)
