= Feijao =

Feijao is derived from feijão, the Portuguese word for bean. It most commonly refers to:

- Feijoa sellowiana, a fruit also known as guavasteen or pineapple guava
- Phaseolus vulgaris, the common bean

== See also ==
- Feijão (footballer) (born 1992), Brazilian footballer
- Jefferson Feijão (footballer, born 1978), Brazilian footballer
- Jefferson Feijão (footballer, born 1986), Brazilian footballer
- Feijão tropeiro, a typical Brazilian dish
