= Lee Sang-il =

Lee Sang-il (Korean: 이상일) is a Korean name consisting of the family name Lee and the given name Sang-il. It may refer to:

- Lee Sang-il (footballer) (born 1979)
- Lee Sang-il (director) (born 1974)
