= 2003 Copa do Brasil =

Copa do Brasil 2003

Tournament details
- Country: Brazil
- Dates: 2 February – 4 June
- Teams: 65

Final positions
- Champions: Cruzeiro (MG)
- Runners-up: Flamengo (RJ)

Tournament statistics
- Matches played: 118
- Goals scored: 347 (2.94 per match)
- Top goal scorer: Nonato (9)

The Copa do Brasil 2003 was the 15th staging of the Copa do Brasil.

The competition started on 2 February and concluded on 4 June 2003 with the second leg of the final, held at the Mineirão Stadium in Belo Horizonte, in which Cruzeiro lifted the trophy for the fourth time with a 3-1 victory over Flamengo.

Nonato, of Bahia, with nine goals, was the competition's topscorer.

== Format ==
The competition was contested by 65 clubs in a knock-out format where all rounds were played over two legs and the away goals rule was used, with the exception of the preliminary match, which was played in a single match, and in the first two rounds if the away team won the first leg with an advantage of at least two goals, the second leg was not played and the club automatically qualified to the next round.

== Participating teams ==
- Alegrense (ES)
- América (RN)
- Americano (RJ)
- Anapolina (GO)
- Atlético Cajazeirense (PB)
- Atlético (MG)
- Atlético (PR)
- Bahia (BA)
- Bangu (RJ)
- Botafogo (PB)
- Botafogo (RJ)
- Caldense (MG)
- Ceará (CE)
- CENE (MS)
- CFA (RO)
- CFZ (DF)
- Comercial (MS)
- Confiança (SE)
- Corinthians (AL)
- Coríntians (RN)
- Coritiba (PR)
- Criciúma (SC)
- CRB (AL)
- Cruzeiro (MG)
- Dom Bosco (MT)
- Figueirense (SC)
- Flamengo (PI)
- Flamengo (RJ)
- Fluminense (BA)
- Fluminense (RJ)
- Fortaleza (CE)
- Gama (DF)
- Goiás (GO)
- Guarani/VA (RS)
- Guarani (SP)
- Juventude (RS)
- Internacional (RS)
- Ipatinga (MG)
- Iraty (PR)
- Itabaiana (SE)
- Ituano (SP)
- Moto Club (MA)
- Nacional (AM)
- Náutico (PE)
- Operário (MT)
- Palmeiras (SP)
- Paraná (PR)
- Pelotas (RS)
- Remo (PA)
- Rio Branco (AC)
- Rio Branco (ES)
- River (PI)
- Roraima (RR)
- Sampaio Corrêa (MA)
- Santa Cruz (PE)
- São Caetano (SP)
- São Paulo (SP)
- São Raimundo (AM)
- Sport (PE)
- Tocantinópolis (TO)
- Tuna Luso (PA)
- Vasco (RJ)
- Vila Nova (GO)
- Vitória (BA)
- Ypiranga (AP)

== Competition stages ==
Preliminary match
1	Paraná (PR)	0
2	Coritiba (PR)	1

1st Round
CFZ (DF)	0	0
Fortaleza (CE)	0	1
Americano (RJ)	2	2
Figueirense (SC)	1	4
São Raimundo (AM)	2	0
São Paulo (SP)	0	6
Bangu (RJ)	2	0
Gama (DF)	1	2
Ituano (SP)	2	0
Coritiba (PR)	0	1
Ipatinga (MG)	2	0
Goiás (GO)	1	1
CENE (MS)	0
Botafogo (RJ)	2
Sampaio Corrêa (MA)	1
São Caetano (SP)	4
Pelotas (RS)	1	1
Guarani (SP)	2	1
Iraty (PR)	0
Vila Nova (GO)	3
Rio Branco (ES)	2
Cruzeiro (MG)	4
Coríntians (RN)	2	1
Santa Cruz (PE)	0	2
River (PI)	1	2
Moto Club (MA)	0	4
Vasco (RJ)	1	4
Itabaiana (SE)	0	0
Atlético (PB)	1	1
Bahia (BA)	1	4
CF Amazônia (RO)	3	0
Rio Branco (AC)	0	2
Alegrense (ES)	2	1
Criciúma (SC)	3	5
Palmeiras (SP)	1	5
Operário (MT)	0	1
Tocantinópolis (TO)	1	1
Vitória (BA)	2	0
Atlético (RR)	4	0
Nacional (AM)	1	2
Confiança (SE)	1	0
Ceará (CE)	0	2
Flamengo (RJ)	4
Botafogo (PB)	1
Ypiranga (AP)	1
Remo (PA)	3
Internacional (RS)	2
Comercial (MS)	0
Corinthians (AL)	0	0
Flamengo (PI)	1	1
Fluminense (RJ)	1	4
Fluminense (BA)	1	0
Dom Bosco (MT)	0
Sport (PE)	5
Atlético (PR)	2	1
Tuna Luso (PA)	2	0
Juventude (RS)	2	1
Caldense (MG)	1	2
Atlético (MG)	1	4
CRB (AL)	0	0
Anapolina (GO)	1	1
Náutico (PE)	2	3
América (RN)	1	1
Guarani (RS)	2	0

2nd Round
Fortaleza (CE)	3	0
Figueirense (SC)	1	2
São Paulo (SP)	2	5
Gama (DF)	2	1
Ituano (SP)	1	1
Goiás (GO)	1	1
Botafogo (RJ)	2	2
São Caetano (SP)	1	0
Guarani (SP)	3	0
Vila Nova (GO)	1	1
Coríntians (RN)	2	0
Cruzeiro (MG)	2	7
Moto Club (MA)	0
Vasco (RJ)	2
CF Amazônia (RO)	3	1
Bahia (BA)	3	4
Criciúma (SC)	1	1
Palmeiras (SP)	1	2
Vitória (BA)	2	5
Atlético (RR)	1	1
Ceará (CE)	1	0
Flamengo (RJ)	0	1
Remo (PA)	1	1
Internacional (RS)	0	2
Flamengo (PI)	1	0
Fluminense (RJ)	2	2
Sport (PE)	3	1
Atlético (PR)	2	0
Caldense (MG)	0	0
Atlético (MG)	1	4
Náutico (PE)	1	3
América (RN)	2	1

3rd Round
Figueirense (SC)	0	0
São Paulo (SP)	2	1
Goiás (GO)	2	3
Botafogo (RJ)	1	2
Vila Nova (GO)	0	1
Cruzeiro (MG)	2	2
Bahia (BA)	2	0
Vasco (RJ)	1	1
Palmeiras (SP)	2	3
Vitória (BA)	7	1
Flamengo (RJ)	4	3
Remo (PA)	0	2
Fluminense (RJ)	0	1
Sport (PE)	1	2
Atlético (MG)	2	3
Náutico (PE)	1	1

Quarterfinals
São Paulo (SP)	0	1
Goiás (GO)	0	1
Cruzeiro (MG)	2	1
Vasco (RJ)	1	1
Vitória (BA)	1	1
Flamengo (RJ)	2	3
Sport (PE)	4	1
Atlético (MG)	0	3

Semifinals
Goiás (GO)	2	1
Cruzeiro (MG)	3	2
Flamengo (RJ)	1	0
Sport (PE)	0	0

Finals
Cruzeiro (MG)	1	3
Flamengo (RJ)	1	1

Copa do Brasil
2003 winners

Fourth title
