= Kim Sung-keon =

South Korean footballer (born 1977)

Personal information
- Date of birth: June 20, 1977 (age 49)
- Place of birth: Seoul, South Korea
- Height: 1.81 m (5 ft 11 in)
- Position: Defender

Youth career
- 1993–1995: Daeshin High School
- 1996–1999: Yonsei University

Senior career*
Years	Team	Apps	(Gls)
2000–2003	Daejeon Citizen	98	(4)
2004–2007	Pohang Steelers	88	(0)
2008	Jeonbuk Hyundai Motors	7	(0)
2008	Suwon Samsung Bluewings	4	(0)
- * Club domestic league appearances and goals

- Kim Sung-keon
- Hangul: 김성근
- Hanja: 金成根
- RR: Gim Seonggeun
- MR: Kim Sŏnggŭn

Kim Sung-keon (born June 20, 1977) is a South Korean former professional footballer who has played as a defender for Suwon Samsung Bluewings (formerly Daejeon Citizen, Pohang Steelers and Jeonbuk Hyundai Motors).

== Career statistics ==
Appearances and goals by club, season and competition
Club	Season	League			Korean FA Cup		K-League Cup		Asia		Total	
Club	Season	Division	Apps	Goals	Apps	Goals	Apps	Goals	Apps	Goals	Apps	Goals
Daejeon Citizen	2000	K League	12	1			5	0	–			
Daejeon Citizen	2001	K League	21	0			6	0	–			
Daejeon Citizen	2002	K League	25	1			7	0				
Daejeon Citizen	2003	K League	40	2	3	0	–					
Daejeon Citizen	Total		98	4			18	0				
Pohang Steelers	2004	K League	24	0	1	0	0	0	–		25	0
Pohang Steelers	2005	K League	21	0	2	0	12	0	–		35	0
Pohang Steelers	2006	K League	23	0	0	0	8	0	–		31	0
Pohang Steelers	2007	K League	20	0	4	0	3	0	–		27	0
Pohang Steelers	Total		88	0	7	0	23	0	0	0	118	0
Jeonbuk Hyundai Motors	2008	K League	7	0	0	0	3	0	–		10	0
Suwon Samsung Bluewings	2008	K League	4	0	1	0	3	0	–		8	0
Career total			197	4			47	0				
