= Marcelo Macedo =

Brazilian footballer

Personal information
- Full name: Marcelo Macedo Ferreira
- Date of birth: 1 February 1983 (age 43)
- Place of birth: Petrópolis, Brazil
- Height: 1.76 m (5 ft 9 in)
- Position: Attacking midfielder

Youth career
- 2001: Fluminense

Senior career*
Years	Team	Apps	(Gls)
2002–2004	Fluminense	44	(7)
2004	→ Seongnam FC (Loan)	7	(1)
2005	→ Juventude (Loan)		
2005–2006	→ Atlas (Loan)	25	(6)
2006	→ Flamengo (Loan)		
2006	CF Rio de Janeiro		
2006	→ Madureira (Loan)		
2007	Atlético Paranaense	12	(3)
2008	Tombense	0	(0)
2008	→ Ipatinga (Loan)	1	(0)
2008	→ Panserraikos (Loan)	0	(0)
2009	→ Figueirense (Loan)	11	(1)
2010	→ Duque de Caxias (Loan)	7	(1)
2011	Macaé	0	(0)
2011	Guarani	13	(6)
2012	Mogi Mirim	7	(0)
2012–2013	Boa Esporte	31	(12)
2013	→ Paulista (Loan)	1	(0)
2013	Junior FC	4	(0)
2014	Botafogo-SP	0	(0)
2014	CRB	16	(?)
2015	Mirassol	12	(1)
2016	Flamengo-PI	5	(0)
2016	Tombense	0	(0)
2016	Serrano		
- * Club domestic league appearances and goals

Marcelo Macedo Ferreira (born 1 February 1983), or simply Marcelo Macedo, is a Brazilian former professional footballer who played as an attacking midfielder.

== Career ==
Macedo played for Panserraikos from July to December 2008, on loan from Tombense-MG.

== Honours ==
- Rio de Janeiro State League: 2002
- South Korean Cup: 2004
