= Lim Hyun-woo =

South Korean footballer

Lim Hyun-Woo
Personal information
- Full name: Lim Hyun-Woo
- Date of birth: 26 March 1983 (age 43)
- Place of birth: South Korea
- Height: 1.73 m (5 ft 8 in)
- Position: Midfielder

Youth career
- Ajou University

Senior career*
Years	Team	Apps	(Gls)
2005–2009	Daegu FC	31	
2014	Singhtarua	7	(0)
2014	→ Royal Thai Navy (loan)	0	(0)
- * Club domestic league appearances and goals as of 18 April 2009

Lim Hyun-Woo (Korean: 임현우; born 26 March 1983) is a South Korean football midfielder. who plays for Royal Thai Navy.
