= Zoran Urumov =

Serbian footballer (born 1977)

Personal information
- Date of birth: 30 August 1977 (age 49)
- Place of birth: Belgrade, SR Serbia, SFR Yugoslavia
- Height: 1.80 m (5 ft 11 in)
- Position: Midfielder

Youth career
- Red Star Belgrade

Senior career*
| Years | Team | Apps | (Gls) |
| 1995–1999 | Red Star Belgrade | 2 | (0) |
| 1995–1996 | → Voždovac (loan) | | |
| 1996–1997 | → Balkan Mirijevo (loan) | | |
| 1997–1998 | → Radnički Kragujevac (loan) | 24 | (1) |
| 1998–1999 | → Milicionar (loan) | 13 | (0) |
| 1999–2003 | Busan I'Cons | 81 | (12) |
| 2003–2004 | Suwon Samsung Bluewings | 17 | (1) |
| 2005–2006 | Rad | 19 | (4) |
| 2006 | Thrasyvoulos | 9 | (3) |
| 2007 | Banat Zrenjanin | 3 | (0) |
| 2007 | Sinđelić Beograd | | |
| 2008 | Banat Zrenjanin | 16 | (3) |
| 2008–2009 | Rudar Pljevlja | 11 | (0) |
| Total | | 195+ | (24+) |

International career
| 1995 | FR Yugoslavia U18 (Note: Official UEFA matches only) | 2 | (0) |
| 1998 | FR Yugoslavia U21 | 1 | (0) |
- * Club domestic league appearances and goals

Zoran Urumov (Serbian Cyrillic: Зоран Урумов; born 30 August 1977) is a Serbian former professional footballer who played as a midfielder.

== Club career ==
=== Early career ===
Urumov began his career on the books of Red Star Belgrade, making his first-team debut in the 1995–96 season. He also played on loan at Voždovac (1995–96), Balkan Mirijevo (1996–97), Radnički Kragujevac (1997–98), and Milicionar (1998–99).

=== Busan I'Cons ===
In 1999, Urumov joined K League side Busan I'Cons, quickly establishing himself as one of the best players in the league. He amassed a total of 105 appearances between 1999 and 2003, tallying 17 goals for the club which was struggling to return to the top of Korean football. In June 2003, Urumov scored two goals for Busan in a 4–1 friendly win over Dutch powerhouse Feyenoord, but just one month later moved to Suwon Samsung Bluewings on a Bosman transfer (signing bonus of US$350,000).

=== Suwon Samsung Bluewings ===
Upon his arrival to Suwon, Urumov slotted in well to Kim Ho's young squad, but lost his place in the starting lineup when Kim was replaced as manager by Cha Bum-kun for the 2004 season. He then took on the role of perennial substitute, often being deployed in the final twenty minutes of a match to make full use of his pace. On 29 July 2004, Urumov made headlines around the sports world by scoring a stunning 35-yard free kick in Suwon's 1–0 friendly win over Spanish giants Barcelona after coming on as a second-half substitute. He eventually lifted the K League championship trophy in December 2004, scoring the final Suwon goal in the penalty shootout at the end of their playoff final match against Pohang Steelers in what turned out to be his last match for the club.

=== Later career ===
In July 2005, Urumov was acquired by newly promoted Serbia and Montenegro SuperLiga side Rad. He was suspended by the club in September 2005, along with six other teammates, after refusing to train due to unpaid wages. However, after the issue was resolved, Urumov returned to action and continued playing for Rad until the end of the 2005–06 season.

In the summer of 2006, Urumov moved to Greek club Thrasyvoulos, but was released during the winter break. He subsequently joined Serbian SuperLiga side Banat Zrenjanin. In the summer of 2007, Urumov switched to Serbian League Belgrade club Sinđelić Beograd. He returned to Banat Zrenjanin the following winter. In the summer of 2008, Urumov moved to Montenegrin First League side Rudar Pljevlja in June 2008, spending one season with the club.

== International career ==
Urumov was capped for FR Yugoslavia at under-18 and under-21 levels.

== Honours ==
Red Star Belgrade

- FR Yugoslavia Cup: 1998–99

Suwon Samsung Bluewings

- K League: 2004

Individual

- K League Top Assists Award: 2001
- K League Best XI: 2001
