= Goran Petreski =

Yugoslav footballer

Personal information
- Full name: Goran Petreski; Горан Петрески
- Date of birth: 23 May 1972 (age 54)
- Place of birth: Skopje, SFR Yugoslavia
- Height: 1.78 m (5 ft 10 in)
- Position: Forward

Senior career*
Years	Team	Apps	(Gls)
1992–1996	Vardar		
1999-2000	Vardar	21	(10)
2000–2001	Čakovec	13	(2)
2001–2004	Pohang Steelers	114	(28)

International career
1994–1996	Macedonia	4	(0)

Managerial career
- 2010–2011: Rabotnichki (assistant)
- 2011: Rabotnichki
- 2011–: Macedonia U-17
- 2011–2012: Rabotnichki (youth team)
- 2012: Rabotnichki (assistant)
- 2012: Rabotnichki
- 2024: Vardar
- * Club domestic league appearances and goals

Goran Petreski (Macedonian: Горан Петрески) (born 23 May 1972 in SFR Yugoslavia) is a football coach from North Macedonia.

== Playing career ==
=== Club ===
He played for Vardar Skopje, with whom he won his newly independent country's first three league titles.

=== Pohang Steelers (2001–2004) ===
Petreski joined Korean K-League side Pohang Steelers at the beginning of the 2001 season. He played in 25 of Pohang's 27 regular league season matches that year scoring eight times and finishing joint fifth top scorer in the league and top scorer at Pohang. In 2002 he netted nine times in 23 appearances, again top scorer at his club. He finally hit double figures in the 2003 season as he netted ten goals in 40 appearances but finished second-top Pohang goalscorer behind Woo Sung-Yong that year who hit fifteen. In the 2004 regular season he found goals a lot harder to come by, scoring just once in 26 appearances as Pohang finished runners-up to Suwon Samsung Bluewings in that year's K-League Championship final.

Petreski made a total of 114 regular league appearances during his time in Korea scoring 28 times. Including League Cup competitions he scored 38 goals in 141 appearances. He collected runners-up medals in the 2004 K-League Championship and the Korean FA Cup finals of 2001 and 2002 but did not win any silverware during his stay in Korea.

=== International ===
He made his senior debut for Macedonia in a May 1994 friendly match against Albania and has earned a total of 4 caps, scoring no goals. His final international was a March 1996 friendly against Malta.
