= Lee Sung-jae (footballer, born 1976) =

South Korean footballer

Personal information
- Date of birth: 16 May 1976 (age 50)
- Place of birth: South Korea
- Height: 1.78 m (5 ft 10 in)
- Position: Forward

Youth career
- 1995–1999: Korea University

Senior career*
| Years | Team | Apps | (Gls) |
| 1999–2003 | Bucheon SK | 84 | (15) |
| 2004 | Busan I'Cons | 8 | (0) |
| 2006 | Ulsan Hyundai Horangi | 4 | (0) |
| 2008 | Yangju Citizen | ? | (?) |
- * Club domestic league appearances and goals as of 18 June 2011 ‡ National team caps and goals as of 18 June 2011

- Lee Sung-jae
- Hangul: 이성재
- Hanja: 李成宰
- RR: I Seongjae
- MR: I Sŏngjae

Lee Sung-jae (born 16 May 1976) is a South Korean footballer.

== Football career ==
He started professional football career with Bucheon SK (currently Jeju United FC) in 1999. He awarded Rookie of the Year of 1999 season.

== Honours ==
Individual

- K-League Rookie of the Year Award: 1999
