= Moon Min-kui =

South Korean footballer (born 1981)

Moon Min-Kui 문민귀
Personal information
- Full name: Moon Min-Kui
- Date of birth: 15 November 1981 (age 44)
- Place of birth: Suncheon, Jeonnam, South Korea
- Height: 1.75 m (5 ft 9 in)
- Position: Midfielder

Youth career
- Honam University

Senior career*
Years	Team	Apps	(Gls)
2004–2005	Pohang Steelers	32	(0)
2006	Gyeongnam FC	8	(0)
2006–2010	Suwon Samsung Bluewings	29	(0)
2011	Jeju United	1	(0)
- * Club domestic league appearances and goals as of 22 November 2011 ‡ National team caps and goals as of 5 March 2009

- Moon Min-kui
- Hangul: 문민귀
- Hanja: 文民貴
- RR: Mun Mingwi
- MR: Mun Min'gwi

Moon Min-Kui (Korean: 문민귀, born 15 November 1981) is a South Korean footballer who plays as a midfielder.

In 2004, his first season, his team was runner-up K-League 2004. He helped this honor so he awarded Rookie of the Year award in spite of 1 goal and 2 assists. He has only one goal scored against Gwangju Sangmu Bulsajo in Hauzen Cup 2004 as Pohang Steelers player.

End of 2005 season, he was first contract player of newly formed Gyeongnam FC. But cause of injuries and rehabilitation, he did not show his best play. He moved Suwon Samsung Bluewings in summer period.

== Club career statistics ==
Club performance			League		Cup		League Cup		Continental		Total	
Season	Club	League	Apps	Goals	Apps	Goals	Apps	Goals	Apps	Goals	Apps	Goals
South Korea			League		KFA Cup		League Cup		Asia		Total	
2004	Pohang Steelers	K-League	24	0	0	0	11	1	-		35	1
2005	Pohang Steelers	K-League	8	0	0	0	9	0	-		17	0
2006	Gyeongnam FC	K-League	8	0	1	0	4	0	-		13	0
2006	Suwon Samsung Bluewings	K-League	10	0	1	0	0	0	-		11	0
2007	Suwon Samsung Bluewings	K-League	5	0	0	0	2	0	-		7	0
2008	Suwon Samsung Bluewings	K-League	3	0	0	0	2	0	-		5	0
2009	Suwon Samsung Bluewings	K-League	7	0	3	0	2	0			9	0
2010	Suwon Samsung Bluewings	K-League	4	0	0	0	0	0			4	0
2011	Jeju United	K-League	1	0	0	0	1	0	0	0	2	0
Career total			70	0	5	0	31	1			106	1
