= Kim Hyo-il =

South Korean football midfielder (born 1979)

Kim Hyo-Il
Personal information
- Full name: Kim Hyo-Il
- Date of birth: 7 September 1979 (age 47)
- Place of birth: South Korea
- Height: 1.80 m (5 ft 11 in)
- Position: Midfielder

Team information
- Current team: Chungju Hummel FC (Player-coach)
- Number: 38

Youth career
- Gyeongsang University

Senior career*
Years	Team	Apps	(Gls)
2003–2006	Chunnam Dragons	66	(1)
2007–2008	Gyeongnam FC	40	(2)
2009–2010	Busan I'Park	17	(0)
2011	Ulsan Hyundai Mipo Dockyard	13	(0)
2012	Loyola	12	(2)
2012–2013	Stallion	16	(4)
2014–	Chungju Hummel	0	(0)
- * Club domestic league appearances and goals as of 12 December 2014

Kim Hyo-Il (born 7 September 1979) is a South Korean football midfielder who plays for Chungju Hummel in the K League Classic as a player-coach. Kim often plays as a defensive midfielder, but also as an attacking midfielder and right winger.

== Club career ==
=== South Korea ===
In 2003, Kim signed with the Chunnam Dragons, a club based in the Korean city of Gwangyang that plays in the K-League. He transferred to Gyeongnam FC in the 2007 K-League season, and went on to play for the club until 2008. Kim has also played for Korean-based football clubs Busan I'Park and Ulsan Hyundai Mipo Dockyard.

=== Philippines ===
In 2012, Kim signed with the Loyola Meralco Sparks to play in the first division of the United Football League. He transferred to Stallion FC for the 2012–13 United Football Cup, and made his debut in a 6–0 win against Sta. Lucia FC.

== Club statistics ==
Club performance			League		Cup		League Cup		Continental		Total	
Season	Club	League	Apps	Goals	Apps	Goals	Apps	Goals	Apps	Goals	Apps	Goals
South Korea			League		KFA Cup		League Cup		Asia		Total	
2003	Chunnam Dragons	K-League	19	0	5	0	-		-		24	0
2004	Chunnam Dragons	K-League	13	0	3	0	3	0	-		19	0
2005	Chunnam Dragons	K-League	10	0	3	0	7	0	-		20	0
2006	Chunnam Dragons	K-League	24	1	4	0	11	0	-		39	1
2007	Gyeongnam FC	K-League	24	1	2	1	5	0	-		31	2
2008	Gyeongnam FC	K-League	16	1	1	0	9	0	-		26	1
2009	Busan I'Park	K-League							-			
Philippines			League		Cup		UFL Cup		Asia		Total	
2012	Loyola	UFL	12	2	0	0	0	0	0	0	12	2
2012	Stallion	UFL	0	0	0	0	6	0	0	0	6	0
2013	Stallion	UFL	16	4	1	0	0	0	0	0	17	4
Total	South Korea		106	3	18	1	35	0	-		159	4
Total	Philippines		28	6	1	0	6	0	-		35	6
Career total			134	9	19	1	41	6			194	10

== Honours ==
=== Club ===
Stallion

- UFL Division 1: 2013
- UFL Cup: 2012

Sporting positions
Preceded by Kim Do-Kyun	Chunnam Dragons captain 2006	Succeeded by Song Jung-Hyun
Preceded by Kim Do-Keun	Gyeongnam FC captain 2007–2008	Succeeded by Lee Sang-Hong
