= Park Jong-woo (footballer, born 1979) =

South Korean footballer

Personal information
- Date of birth: April 11, 1979 (age 47)
- Place of birth: South Korea
- Height: 1.76 m (5 ft 9 in)
- Position: Midfielder

Youth career
- 1995–1997: Kangdong High School
- 1998–2001: Soongsil University

Senior career*
Years	Team	Apps	(Gls)
2002–2003	Chunnam Dragons	50	(1)
2004–2005	Gwangju Sangmu Bulsajo (Army)	41	(2)
2006	Chunnam Dragons	19	(0)
2007–2009	Gyeongnam FC	48	(4)
2009–2010	Ulsan Hyundai Mipo Dockyard	0	(0)
2011	Yanbian Baekdu Tigers	18	(6)
- * Club domestic league appearances and goals as of 7 August 2009

- Park Jong-woo
- Hangul: 박종우
- Hanja: 朴鐘佑
- RR: Bak Jongu
- MR: Pak Chongu

Park Jong-woo (born April 11, 1979) is a South Korean football player who is currently a free agent.

He formerly played for Gyeongnam FC, Chunnam Dragons and Gwangju Sangmu Phoenix.

== Club career statistics ==
Club performance			League		Cup		League Cup		Continental		Total	
Season	Club	League	Apps	Goals	Apps	Goals	Apps	Goals	Apps	Goals	Apps	Goals
South Korea			League		KFA Cup		League Cup		Asia		Total	
2002	Chunnam Dragons	K-League	24	1	?	?	0	0	-			
2003	Chunnam Dragons	K-League	26	0	1	0	-		-		27	0
2004	Gwangju Sangmu Phoenix	K-League	22	1	3	0	10	2	-		35	3
2005	Gwangju Sangmu Phoenix	K-League	19	1	0	0	9	0	-		28	1
2006	Chunnam Dragons	K-League	19	0	4	0	12	0	-		35	0
2007	Gyeongnam FC	K-League	25	3	2	0	4	0	-		31	3
2008	Gyeongnam FC	K-League	22	1	2	0	6	0	-		30	1
2009	Gyeongnam FC	K-League	1	0	0	0	0	0	-		1	0
Total	South Korea		158	7			41	2	-			
Career total			158	7			41	2				
