= Son Jeong-tak =

South Korean footballer (born 1976)

Son Jeong-Tak
Personal information
- Full name: Son Jeong-Tak (손정탁)
- Date of birth: May 3, 1976 (age 50)
- Place of birth: South Korea
- Height: 1.95 m (6 ft 5 in)
- Position: Forward

Youth career
- University of Ulsan

Senior career*
| Years | Team | Apps | (Gls) |
| 1999–2001 | Ulsan Hyundai Horang-i | 23 | (2) |
| 2002–2003 | Gwangju Sangmu Bulsajo (army) | 34 | (4) |
| 2004–2005 | Jeonbuk Hyundai Motors | 5 | (0) |
| 2005–2006 | Suwon Samsung Bluewings | 17 | (0) |
| 2007 | Changwon City FC | 3 | (0) |
- * Club domestic league appearances and goals as of Sep 3 2008

Son Jeong-Tak (born May 3, 1976; Hanja:孫禎鐸, Korean: 손정탁) is a South Korean football player who was play at forward for Changwon City FC at National League in South Korea.

== Career ==
- 1999~2001 Ulsan Hyundai Horang-i
- 2002~2003 Gwangju Sangmu Bulsajo (For military duty)
- 2004~2005 Jeonbuk Hyundai Motors
- 2005~2006 Suwon Samsung Bluewings
- 2007 Changwon City FC
