= Jefferson Feijão (footballer, born 1986) =

Brazilian footballer

Personal information
- Full name: Jefferson da Silva Luciano
- Date of birth: 16 December 1986 (age 39)
- Place of birth: Brasília, Brazil
- Height: 1.68 m (5 ft 6 in)
- Position: Right-back

Team information
- Current team: Luverdense

Senior career*
Years	Team	Apps	(Gls)
2006	CENE		
2007–2008	Vila Nova		
2008	Brusque		
2009–2011	Ferroviária		
2010	→ Paraná (loan)		
2011	Itaporã		
2012	Ypiranga-RS		
2012	São José-SP		
2012	Icasa		
2012	Bragantino		
2013	Caldense		
2013	Guarani		
2014	São Caetano		
2014	Volta Redonda		
2014	Guarani		
2014	Luziânia		
2015–2016	Caldense		
2016–2017	Vila Nova		
2017	→ Ituano (loan)		
2017–2018	Caldense		
2018	Cuiabá		
2019–2020	XV de Piracicaba		
2020–2021	Portuguesa		
2022	Oeste		
2022–2023	Santa Cruz		
2023	Anapolina		
2024	Pouso Alegre		
2024	Serra Branca-PB		
2024	Trindade		
2025–	Luverdense		
- * Club domestic league appearances and goals as of 3 August 2025

Jefferson da Silva Luciano (born 16 December 1986), better known as Jefferson Feijão, is a Brazilian professional footballer who plays as a right-back.

== Career ==
In February 2019, while defending XV de Piracicaba, Jefferson Feijão was involved in a traffic accident where it was found that he was drunk.

In 2023, he asked to leave Santa Cruz FC after fans threatened his daughter. On 2024 season played for Pouso Alegre, Serra Branca and Trindade. For the 2025 season, Feijão agreed to return to Mato Grosso football, signing a contract with Luverdense.

== Honours ==
Cuiabá

- Campeonato Matogrossense: 2018

Portuguesa

- Copa Paulista: 2020
