= Roman Gibala =

Czech footballer

Personal information
- Full name: Roman Gibala
- Date of birth: 5 October 1972 (age 54)
- Height: 1.77 m (5 ft 10 in)
- Position: Midfielder

Senior career*
Years	Team	Apps	(Gls)
1994	FK Fotbal Třinec		
1995	FK Drnovice		
1995–1996	FC Union Cheb		
1996–1998	FC Hradec Králové		
1998–2001	FK Viktoria Žižkov		
2001–2003	FK Drnovice		
2003	Daegu FC	19	(1)
2004	FK Drnovice	40	(1)
2004–2005	FK AS Pardubice		
2005–2007	SK Hanácká Slavia Kroměříž		
- * Club domestic league appearances and goals

Roman Gibala (born 5 October 1972) is a Czech former professional footballer who played as a midfielder.

== Club career ==
He played mainly for Czech football clubs, as well as for Daegu FC of the South Korean in 2003.

== Enternal links ==
- Roman Gibala – K League stats at kleague.com (in Korean and English)
