= Jan Kraus (footballer) =

Czech footballer

Personal information
- Date of birth: 28 August 1979 (age 47)
- Place of birth: Czechoslovakia
- Position: Forward

Senior career*
Years	Team	Apps	(Gls)
1997–2005	SK Hradec Králové	60	(9)
2000–2001	→ FC Viktoria Plzeň (loan)	17	(4)
2001	→ FK Baník Most (loan)		
2003	→ Daegu FC (loan)	28	(5)
2005–2009	FC Tescoma Zlín	79	(10)

International career
1994	Czech Republic U15	2	(1)
1997	Czech Republic U17	3	(0)
1997	Czech Republic U18	5	(0)
2000	Czech Republic U21	1	(0)
- * Club domestic league appearances and goals

Jan Kraus (born 28 August 1979) is a retired professional Czech football player who played more than 150 matches in the Czech First League. During his career he spent a season in South Korea, playing for Daegu FC in the 2003 K League.
