= Min Young-ki =

South Korean footballer (born 1976)

Min Young-Ki
Personal information
- Full name: Min Young-Ki (민영기)
- Date of birth: March 28, 1976 (age 50)
- Place of birth: South Korea
- Height: 1.83 m (6 ft 0 in)
- Position: Defender

Team information
- Current team: Yongin City (assistant coach)

Senior career*
Years	Team	Apps	(Gls)
1999–2000	Ulsan Hyundai	13	(0)
2001–2003	Ulsan Hyundai Mipo		
2004–2005	Daegu FC	35	(0)
2006–2008	Daejeon Citizen	64	(0)
2009	Busan IPark	13	(0)
2010–2012	Yongin City	37	(1)

Managerial career
- 2013–: Yongin City (assistant coach)
- * Club domestic league appearances and goals

Min Young-Ki (born March 28, 1976) is a South Korean retired football player.
