= Park Jong-jin (footballer, born 1980) =

South Korean footballer

Park Jong-Jin
Personal information
- Date of birth: 4 May 1980 (age 46)
- Place of birth: Gokseong, Jeonnam, South Korea
- Height: 1.70 m (5 ft 7 in)
- Position: Defender

Youth career
- 1999–2002: Honam University

Senior career*
Years	Team	Apps	(Gls)
2003–2014	Daegu FC	201	(1)
2008–2009	→ Gwangju Sangmu (army)	23	(0)
- * Club domestic league appearances and goals as of 29 January 2014

- Park Jong-jin
- Hangul: 박종진
- Hanja: 朴鐘珍
- RR: Bak Jongjin
- MR: Pak Chongjin

Park Jong-Jin (Korean: 박종진; born 4 May 1980) is a South Korean retired football defender who played for Daegu FC.

== Club career ==
Park was born in Gokseong, Jeonnam. His professional career began with Daegu FC. He is one of Daegu FC's foundation players, and featured in every season for the club from 2003 to 2007. In 2008, he shifted to Gwangju Sangmu, the sports division of the military, due to his joining the army for his compulsory two-year military service. He played in the majority of the league matches for Sangmu during the 2008 season, but did not play a single game for the club during 2009 season.

On 22 October 2009, he was discharged from the army, having fulfilled his military commitments, and returned to Daegu FC. He quickly resumed playing duties, participating in the final match of the 2009 season. On 25 July 2010, Park celebrated 200 professional appearances with his match against Gyeongnam FC.

== Club career statistics ==
As of 16 December 2013

Club performance			League		Cup		League Cup		Total	
Season	Club	League	Apps	Goals	Apps	Goals	Apps	Goals	Apps	Goals
South Korea			League		KFA Cup		League Cup		Total	
2003	Daegu FC	K League 1	39	0	2	0	-		41	0
2004	Daegu FC	K League 1	19	0	1	0	8	0	28	0
2005	Daegu FC	K League 1	20	0	3	0	10	0	33	0
2006	Daegu FC	K League 1	26	0	3	0	10	0	39	0
2007	Daegu FC	K League 1	18	1	2	0	10	0	30	1
2008	Sangmu	K League 1	23	0	1	0	5	0	29	0
2009	Sangmu	K League 1	0	0	0	0	0	0	0	0
2009	Daegu FC	K League 1	1	0	0	0	0	0	1	0
2010	Daegu FC	K League 1	19	0	1	0	2	0	22	0
2011	Daegu FC	K League 1	17	0	0	0	1	0	18	0
2012	Daegu FC	K League 1	24	0	0	0	-		24	0
2013	Daegu FC	K League 1	11	0	0	0	-		11	0
Total	Daegu FC		194	1	12	0	41	0	247	1
Total	Gwangju Sangmu		23	0	1	0	5	0	29	0
Career total			217	1	13	0	46	0	276	1

Sporting positions
Preceded by	Gwangju Sangmu Phoenix captain 2009	Succeeded by Choi Won-Kwon
