= Yoon Won-il =

South Korean footballer (born 1983)

Personal information
- Date of birth: March 31, 1983 (age 43)
- Place of birth: Pohang, South Korea
- Height: 1.76 m (5 ft 9 in)
- Position: Left back

Team information
- Current team: Pohang Steelers
- Number: 34

Youth career
- Pohang Jecheol Technical High School

Senior career*
Years	Team	Apps	(Gls)
2003	Suwon Samsung Bluewings	0	(0)
2004–2005	Daegu FC	22	(1)
2006–2010	Incheon United	55	(1)
2011–	Pohang Steelers	2	(0)
- * Club domestic league appearances and goals as of 4 December 2012

Yoon Won-il (Korean: 윤원일; born March 31, 1983) is a South Korean football player who currently plays for Pohang Steelers in the K-League. He also played for Suwon Samsung Bluewings, Daegu FC and Incheon United.
