= Lee Kyung-soo =

South Korean footballer (born 1973)

Personal information
- Date of birth: October 28, 1973 (age 53)
- Place of birth: South Korea
- Height: 1.81 m (5 ft 11 1/2 in)
- Position: Defender

Team information
- Current team: Ulsan HD (interim head coach)

Youth career
- 1989–1991: Paichai High School
- 1992–1995: Soongsil University

Senior career*
Years	Team	Apps	(Gls)
1996–1997	Suwon Samsung Bluewings	0	(0)
1998	Ulsan Hyundai Horang-i	10	(0)
1999	Cheonan Ilhwa Chunma	9	(0)
2000–2001	Jeonbuk Hyundai Motors	5	(0)
2002	Seoul City		
2003–2004	Daegu FC	30	(2)
2004	Sichuan Guancheng		
2005	Daejeon Citizen	17	(0)

International career
1993	South Korea U-20		
1994–1996	South Korea U-23	21	(1)

Managerial career
- 2006–2007: FC MB (Coach)
- * Club domestic league appearances and goals

- Lee Kyung-soo
- Hangul: 이경수
- Hanja: 李慶洙
- RR: I Gyeongsu
- MR: I Kyŏngsu

Lee Kyung-soo (Korean: 이경수; born October 28, 1973) is a former South Korean football defender, who predominantly played in the South Korean K-League who is the interim head coach of K League 1 club of Ulsan HD.

== Club career ==
Lee's foray as a professional footballer began with the Suwon Samsung Bluewings as a draftee, and he spent two seasons with the club without ever featuring in the K-League before departing for single season spells with Ulsan Hyundai Horang-i and Cheonan Ilhwa Chunma. A two-year stint at Jeonbuk Hyundai Motors followed. Despite spending six years at K-League clubs, Lee had still to establish himself as a first team regular, accumulating a mere 24 games in the K-League, with a few matches in Cup competitions.

Lee then dropped out of the K-League ranks to spend the 2002 season with amateur side Seoul City FC before returning to the K-League with Daegu FC for their inaugural season in the K-League. He finally was able to consider himself as a regular starter in Daegu's side for the 2003 season, playing 22 matches in the K-League. However, the following season he fell out of favour and saw much less match play. By this time Chinese Super League side Sichuan Guancheng was showing interest in Lee's services, and he subsequently signed with the club for the 2004 season. He spent only a single season in China before returning to South Korea for a final season in the K-League with Daejeon Citizen.

== Management career ==
After retiring as a player at the conclusion of the 2005 K-League season, Lee took up a coaching position with FC MB. MB means initial of Hong Myung-bo's given name.

== International career ==
Lee was a member of the South Korea under-20 football team. He was also a squad member of the South Korea under-23 football team (which participated at the 1996 Olympics), even though at the time of the 1996 Olympics, he was still at Soongsil University. It was only after the Olympics that he began his professional career in the K-League.
