= Park Kyung-hwan =

South Korean footballer (born 1976)

Park Kyung-Hwan
Personal information
- Full name: Park Kyung-Hwan
- Date of birth: December 29, 1976 (age 49)
- Place of birth: South Korea
- Height: 1.84 m (6 ft 1/2 in)
- Position: Defender

Senior career*
Years	Team	Apps	(Gls)
1998	Bellmare Hiratsuka		
1999–2000	FSV Frankfurt		
2001–2002	Jeonbuk Hyundai Motors		
2003–2004	Daegu FC		
2005	Pohang Steelers		
- * Club domestic league appearances and goals

Park Kyung-Hwan (born December 29, 1976) is a former South Korean football player.
