= Kim Kwan-kyu =

South Korean speed skater

Personal information
- Nationality: South Korean
- Born: 15 March 1967 (age 58)

Sport
- Sport: Speed skating

Kim Kwan-kyu (born 15 March 1967) is a South Korean speed skater. He competed in three events at the 1988 Winter Olympics.
