= Santiago (footballer, born 1980) =

Brazilian footballer

Personal information
- Full name: Petrony Santiago de Barros
- Date of birth: February 18, 1980 (age 46)
- Place of birth: Salinas, Minas Gerais, Brazil
- Height: 1.90 m (6 ft 3 in)
- Position: Centre back

Team information
- Current team: Boavista (RJ)

Senior career*
Years	Team	Apps	(Gls)
1996–2001	Atlético Mineiro		
2001–2002	Olaria		
2003–2004	Vasco da Gama		
2004–2005	Daegu FC	17	(0)
2006	América (RJ)		
2006–2007	Portuguesa (SP)		
2007	Fortaleza		
2008	Brasiliense		
2009–	Boavista (RJ)		
2010	→ Duque de Caxias (loan)	33	(3)
2010	→ Brasiliense (loan)	28	(5)
2011	→ Duque de Caxias (loan)	27	(0)
- * Club domestic league appearances and goals as of 9 May 2011

Petrony Santiago de Barros (born February 18, 1980, in Salinas, Minas Gerais), or simply Santiago, is a Brazilian footballer who plays as a central defender for Boavista Sport Club. His previous clubs include Portuguesa (SP), América (RJ), Daegu FC in South Korea, Vasco da Gama, Olaria, Atlético Mineiro, Fortaleza, Brasiliense and Duque de Caxias.
