= Javier Musa =

Argentine footballer

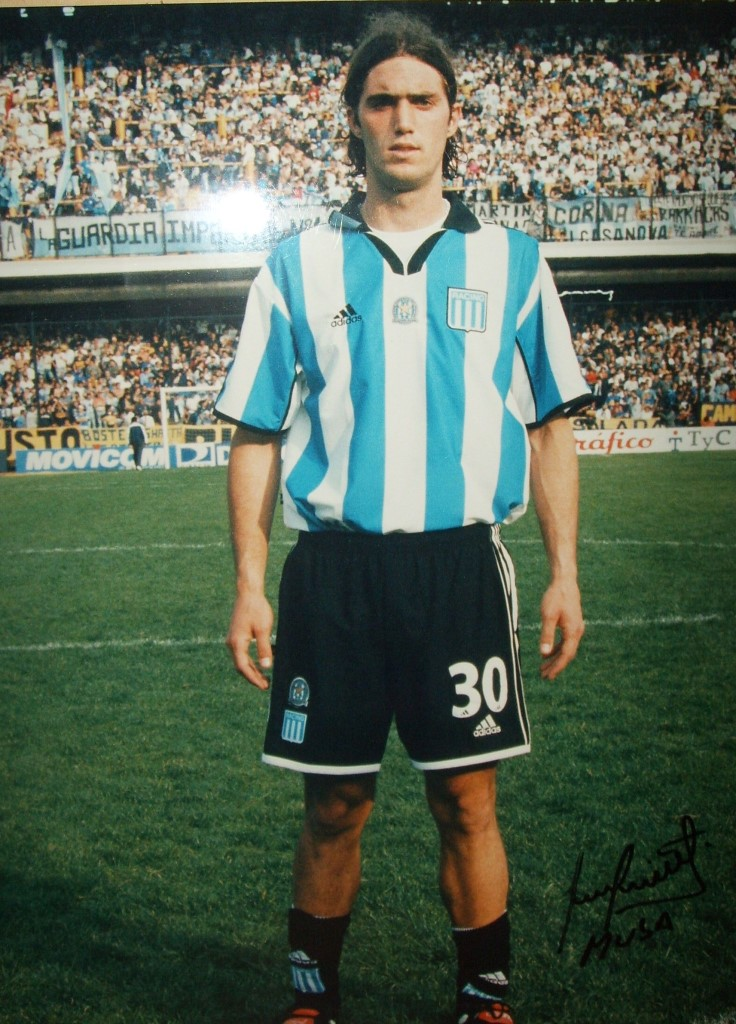

Personal information
- Full name: Javier Martín Musa
- Date of birth: January 15, 1979 (age 47)
- Place of birth: Copetonas, Buenos Aires, Argentina
- Height: 1.90 m (6 ft 3 in)
- Position: Centre back

Senior career*
Years	Team	Apps	(Gls)
1999–2001	Racing Club	11	(0)
2001–2003	Marítimo	1	(0)
2002	→ Leça (loan)	32	(3)
2004–2005	Suwon Bluewings	15	(1)
2005	Ulsan Hyundai Horang-i	7	(0)
2006	Beijing Guoan	27	(0)
- * Club domestic league appearances and goals as of 8 November 2010

Javier Martín Musa (Spanish pronunciation: [xaˈβjeɾ maɾˈtim ˈmusa]; born January 15, 1979) is an Argentine former football player who played as centre back.
