= Rahim Zafer =

Turkish footballer (born 1971)

Personal information
- Full name: Rahim Bekir Zafer
- Date of birth: 25 January 1971 (age 55)
- Place of birth: Adapazarı, Sakarya Province, Turkey
- Height: 1.83 m (6 ft 0 in)
- Position: Defender

Senior career*
Years	Team	Apps	(Gls)
1987–1990	Sakaryaspor		
1990–1996	Gençlerbirliği	166	(14)
1996–2001	Beşiktaş	97	(2)
2001–2002	Diyarbakırspor	28	(1)
2002–2003	Sakaryaspor	10	(0)
2003	Daegu FC	14	(0)
2004–2005	Adanaspor	8	(0)
2005–2006	Kırıkkalespor	7	(1)
2013–2016	Dallas City FC		

International career
1995–1996	Turkey	10	(1)
- * Club domestic league appearances and goals

Rahim Zafer (born 25 January 1971 in Adapazarı) is a former Turkish football player.

Zafer played for several clubs during his career including Sakaryaspor (1987–1990 and 2002–2003), Gençlerbirliği SK (1990–1996), Beşiktaş JK (1996–2001), Diyarbakırspor (2001–2002), Adanaspor (2004–2005), MKE Kırıkkalespor (2005–2006) and Daegu FC (2003–2004). He played for the Turkey national football team and was a player-participant at the 1996 UEFA European Championship. Since retiring in 2006, Zafer has been assistant manager for Kastamonuspor, Uşakspor and ABB Bugsaş SK. He was named as the manager of Adıyamanspor in 2012.

== International goals ==
Results list Turkey's goal tally first.

#	Date	Venue	Opponent	Score	Result	Competition
1.	9 April 1996	Tofiq Bahramov Stadium, Baku, Azerbaijan	Azerbaijan	1–0	1–0	Friendly
