= Yoon Ju-il =

South Korean footballer (born 1980)

Yoon Ju-Il
Personal information
- Full name: Yoon Ju-Il
- Date of birth: 10 March 1980 (age 46)
- Place of birth: South Korea
- Height: 1.76 m (5 ft 9 in)
- Position: Winger

Youth career
- 1999–2002: Dong-A University

Senior career*
Years	Team	Apps	(Gls)
2003–2006	Daegu FC	82	(8)
2007	Incheon United	4	(0)
2007–2009	Chunnam Dragons	14	(0)
2010	Busan I'Park	0	(0)
2011–2013	Suwon FC	41	(1)
- * Club domestic league appearances and goals as of 21 February 2011

- Yoon Ju-il
- Hangul: 윤주일
- Hanja: 尹柱日
- RR: Yun Juil
- MR: Yun Chuil

Yoon Ju-Il (Korean: 윤주일; born 10 March 1980) is a South Korean football winger.

== Club career ==
Yoon is a foundation player for Daegu FC, appearing for the club in its debut season in the K-League. Yoon would stay for four seasons, playing over one hundred matches for the club in all competitions. Although he played in the majority of the club's matches during the 2003 to 2005 seasons, limited matchplay in 2006 saw Yoon shift to Incheon United for 2007 in search of regular first team action. However, the move was not successful, and Yoon moved again midseason to the Chunnam Dragons. He still struggled to establish a regular place in the senior squad, and for the 2010 season, has moved to Busan IPark.

== Club career statistics ==
Club performance			League		Cup		League Cup		Continental		Total	
Season	Club	League	Apps	Goals	Apps	Goals	Apps	Goals	Apps	Goals	Apps	Goals
South Korea			League		KFA Cup		League Cup		Asia		Total	
2003	Daegu FC	K-League	36	5	3	0	-		-		39	5
2004	Daegu FC	K-League	20	2	1	0	9	1	-		30	3
2005	Daegu FC	K-League	14	0	2	0	12	1	-		28	1
2006	Daegu FC	K-League	12	1	2	0	1	0	-		15	1
2007	Incheon United	K-League	4	0	0	0	2	0	-		6	0
2007	Chunnam Dragons	K-League	8	0	1	0	0	0	?	?		
2008	Chunnam Dragons	K-League	4	0	0	0	0	0	0	0	4	0
2009	Chunnam Dragons	K-League	2	0	0	0	2	0	-		4	0
2010	Busan I'Park	K-League	0	0	0	0	0	0	-		0	0
Career total			100	8	11	0	26	2	0	0	137	10
