= Song Jung-hyun =

South Korean footballer (born 1976)

Song Jung-Hyun 송정현
Personal information
- Full name: Song Jung-Hyun
- Date of birth: 28 May 1976 (age 50)
- Place of birth: Daegu, South Korea
- Height: 1.75 m (5 ft 9 in)
- Position: Midfielder

Team information
- Current team: Dalian Aerbin

Youth career
- Ajou University

Senior career*
Years	Team	Apps	(Gls)
1999–2002	Chunnam Dragons	16	(2)
2003–2005	Daegu FC	75	(6)
2006–2008	Chunnam Dragons	67	(10)
2009	Ulsan Hyundai	6	(0)
2009–2011	Chunnam Dragons	38	(4)
2014–	Dalian Aerbin	0	(0)

International career^{‡}
2008	South Korea	2	(0)
- * Club domestic league appearances and goals as of 14 July 2011 ‡ National team caps and goals as of 15 November 2008

- Song Jung-hyun
- Hangul: 송정현
- Hanja: 宋町賢
- RR: Song Jeonghyeon
- MR: Song Chŏnghyŏn

Song Jung-Hyun (Korean: 송정현, born 28 May 1976) is a South Korean footballer.

He was arrested on the charge connected with the match fixing allegations on 7 July 2011.

== Club career statistics ==
Club performance			League		Cup		League Cup		Continental		Total	
Season	Club	League	Apps	Goals	Apps	Goals	Apps	Goals	Apps	Goals	Apps	Goals
South Korea			League		KFA Cup		League Cup		Asia		Total	
1999	Chunnam Dragons	K-League	4	1			1	0				
2000	Chunnam Dragons	K-League	11	1			2	1	-			
2001	Chunnam Dragons	K-League	1	0			4	0	-			
2002	Chunnam Dragons	K-League	0	0			0	0	-			
2003	Daegu FC	K-League	37	3	3	1	-		-		40	4
2004	Daegu FC	K-League	16	1	1	0	9	0	-		26	1
2005	Daegu FC	K-League	22	2	3	1	12	1	-		37	4
2006	Chunnam Dragons	K-League	24	4	4	1	11	2	-		39	7
2007	Chunnam Dragons	K-League	26	3	5	2	1	0	4	0	36	5
2008	Chunnam Dragons	K-League	17	3	0	0	3	1	2	0	22	4
2009	Ulsan Hyundai	K-League	6	0	1	0	0	0	0	0	7	0
2009	Chunnam Dragons	K-League	15	2	1	0	0	0	-		16	2
2010	Chunnam Dragons	K-League	14	2	3	1	3	0	-		17	2
2011	Chunnam Dragons	K-League	9	0	2	0	3	0	-		14	0
Career total			202	22			49	5				

Sporting positions
Preceded by Jin Soon-Jin	Daegu FC captain 2005	Succeeded by Lee Sang-Il
Preceded by Kim Hyo-Il	Chunnam Dragons captain 2007	Succeeded by Kwak Tae-Hwi
