= Hong Soon-hak =

South Korean footballer (born 1980)

Hong Soon-Hak 홍순학
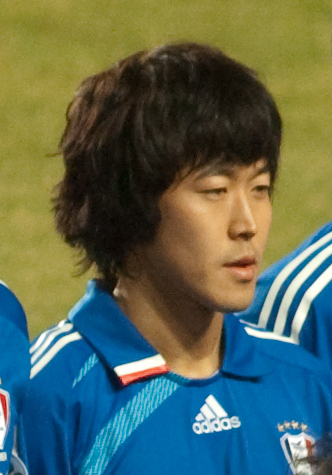
- Soon-hak playing for Suwon Bluewings in 2009.

Personal information
- Full name: Hong Soon-hak
- Date of birth: 19 September 1980 (age 46)
- Place of birth: South Korea
- Height: 1.78 m (5 ft 10 in)
- Position: Midfielder

Team information
- Current team: Amateur club

Youth career
- 1999–2002: Yonsei University

Senior career*
Years	Team	Apps	(Gls)
2003–2005	Daegu FC	48	(3)
2006–2007	Grazer AK	3	(0)
2007–2014	Suwon Bluewings	142	(2)
2015	Goyang Zaicro FC	12	(0)
2016–2017	Persija Jakarta	27	(2)
2017	PS TNI	20	(3)
2018	FC Osaka		
2021–	Amateur club		

International career^{‡}
2005	South Korea	1	(0)
- * Club domestic league appearances and goals as of 12 November 2017 ‡ National team caps and goals as of 7 August 2005

- Hong Soon-hak
- Hangul: 홍순학
- Hanja: 洪淳學
- RR: Hong Sunhak
- MR: Hong Sunhak

Hong Soon-Hak (Korean: 홍순학; born 19 September 1980) is a South Korean footballer who plays as midfielder.

He has previously played for Daegu FC, Suwon Samsung Bluewings, Grazer AK, Goyang Zaicro and Persija.

== Club career statistics ==
As of 9 May 2017

Club performance			League		Cup		League Cup		Continental		Other		Total	
Season	Club	League	Apps	Goals	Apps	Goals	Apps	Goals	Apps	Goals	Apps	Goals	Apps	Goals
2003	Daegu FC	K-League	14	1	3	0	0	0	—		—		17	1
2004	Daegu FC	K-League	18	0	1	0	9	0	—		—		28	0
2005	Daegu FC	K-League	16	2	3	0	7	0	—		—		26	2
Total			48	3	7	0	16	0	—		—		71	3
2006-07	Grazer AK	Austrian Bundesliga	3	0	—		—		—		—		3	0
Total			3	0	—		—		—		—		3	0
2007	Suwon Bluewings	K League Classic	30	0	1	0	7	0	—		—		38	0
2008	Suwon Bluewings	K League Classic	34	2	1	0	5	0	—		—		40	2
2009	Suwon Bluewings	K League Classic	25	0	0	0	0	0	4	1	—		29	1
2010	Suwon Bluewings	K League Classic	12	0	0	0	0	0	1	0	—		13	0
2011	Suwon Bluewings	K League Classic	12	0	0	0	0	0	5	0	—		17	0
2012	Suwon Bluewings	K League Classic	14	0	1	0	—		—		—		15	0
2013	Suwon Bluewings	K League Classic	15	0	1	0	—		4	0	—		20	0
2014	Suwon Bluewings	K League Classic	0	0	0	0	—		—		—		0	0
Total			142	2	4	0	12	0	14	1	—		172	3
2015	Goyang Zaicro	K League Challenge	12	0	—		—		—		—		12	0
Total			12	0	—		—		—		—		12	0
2016	Persija Jakarta	ISC A	27	2	1	0	—		—		—		28	2
Total			27	2	1	0	—		—		—		28	2
2017	PS TNI	Liga 1	20	3	—		—		—		—		5	2
Total			20	3	—		—		—		—		20	3
Career total			225	10	12	0	28	0	14	1	0	0	264	10

== Honours ==
=== Club ===
Suwon Bluewings

- K-League Classic: 2008
- Korean League Cup: 2008
- Korean FA Cup: 2009
- Pan-Pacific Championship: 2009

=== Individual ===
- K-League Top Assistor: 2004
