= Park Junyoung =

South Korean singer (born 1982)

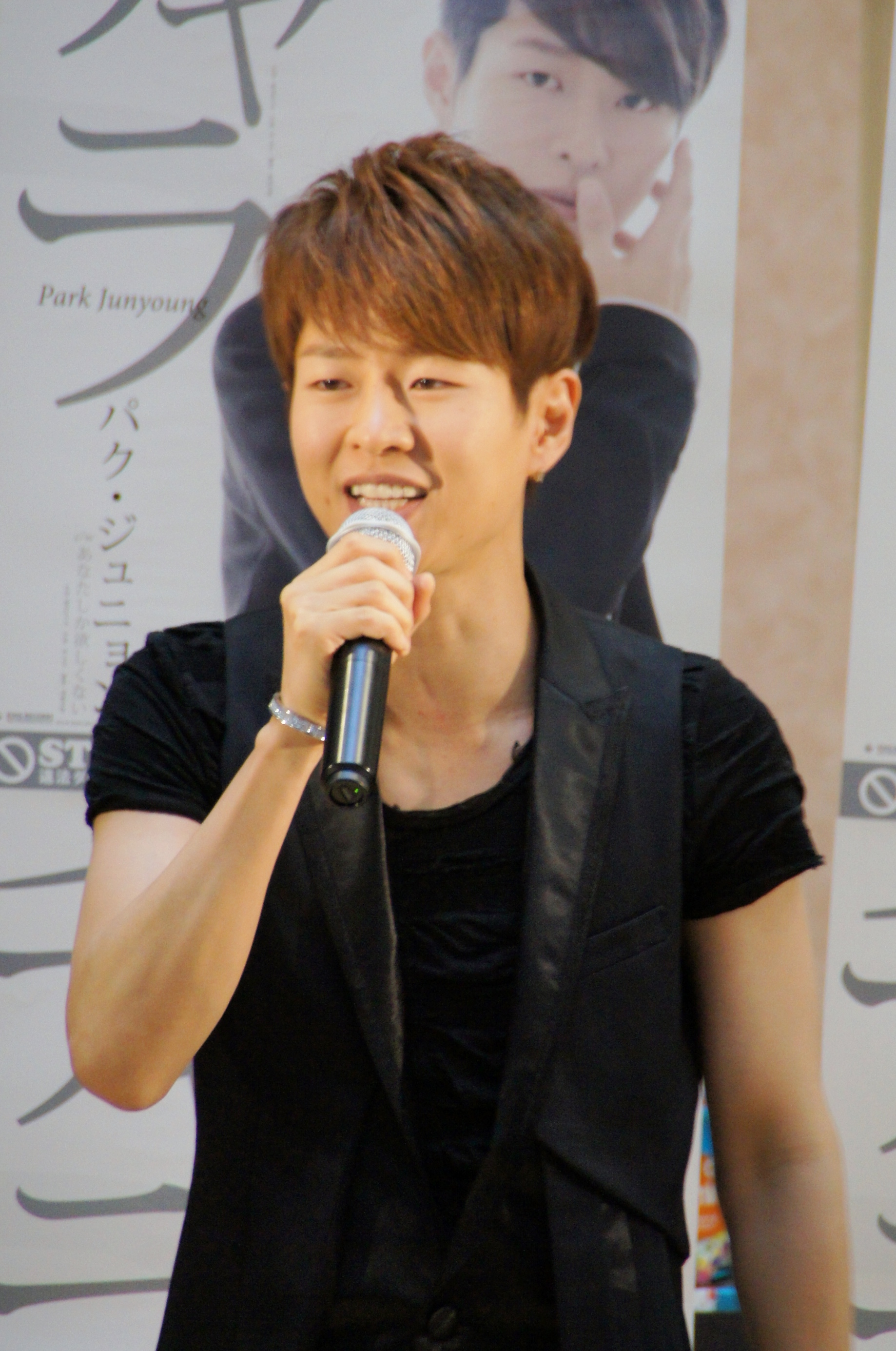
- Park Junyoung at a promotional event in Japan, June 2013

Background information
- Born: 12 March 1982 (age 43)
- Origin: Busan, South Korea
- Occupation: Singer
- Labels: King Records
- Website: www.go-go-juny.com

Park Junyoung (Korean: 박준영; born 12 March 1982) is a South Korean singer from Busan who debuted in Japan in March 2012 with the single "Ai – Que Sera Sera" (愛・ケセラセラ).

== Career ==
Park was a member of two different K-pop bands in South Korea, but they both disbanded.

He was subsequently spotted by Japanese enka singer George Yamamoto while performing as an independent musician in western Japan. His Japanese debut single, "Ai – Que Sera Sera" (愛・ケセラセラ), was released on 7 March 2012 on the King Records label, and reached number 109 on the Oricon music chart.

Park's second Japanese single, "Chara" (チャラ), was released on 13 March 2013, and reached number 44 on the Oricon music chart. On the same day, Park embarked on a tour of all 47 prefectures of Japan to promote the single.

== Discography ==
=== Singles ===
- "Ai – Que Sera Sera" (愛・ケセラセラ), (7 March 2012)
- "Chara" (チャラ), (13 March 2013)

== See also ==
- List of K-pop artists
