= Índio (footballer, born 1979) =

Brazilian footballer

Personal information
- Full name: José Sátiro do Nascimento
- Date of birth: 3 April 1979 (age 47)
- Place of birth: Palmeira dos Índios, Brazil
- Height: 1.79 m (5 ft 10 in)
- Position: Full back

Youth career
- 1996: Vitória

Senior career*
Years	Team	Apps	(Gls)
1998–2000	Corinthians	79	(2)
2001	Goiás		
2002	Caxias		
2002–2003	Santo André		
2003–2005	Daegu FC	49	(3)
2006	Alianza Lima		
2006–2007	PAOK	4	(0)
2007–2008	Vitória		
2008	→ Gama (loan)		
2009	Francana		
2010	Noroeste (SP)		
2010	Remo		
2011	Rio Sao Paulo		
2012	Saad MS		
2012	Formosa		

Managerial career
- 2018: Gavião Kyikatejê
- * Club domestic league appearances and goals as of 15 July 2012

José Sátiro do Nascimento (born 3 April 1979, in Palmeira dos Índios), also known as Índio, is a former Brazilian footballer who plays as a full back.
