= Lee Sang-il (footballer) =

South Korean footballer

Lee Sang-Il
Personal information
- Full name: Lee Sang-Il
- Date of birth: 25 May 1979 (age 47)
- Place of birth: South Korea
- Height: 1.78 m (5 ft 10 in)
- Position: Midfielder

Youth career
- 1997–2000: Chungang University

Senior career*
Years	Team	Apps	(Gls)
2001	Beveren	19	(1)
2001–2002	Germinal Beerschot	6	(0)
2003–2006	Daegu FC	68	(4)
2007–2008	Chunnam Dragons	33	(1)
2009–2010	Changsha Ginde	8	(0)
Total		125	(6)
- * Club domestic league appearances and goals as of 7 October 2009

Lee Sang-Il (Korean: 이상일; born 25 May 1979) is a South Korean football midfielder, who last played for Changsha Ginde in Chinese Super League. His previous clubs were Beveren and Germinal Beerschot in Belgium and Daegu FC and Chunnam Dragons in K-League.

== Club career statistics ==
Club performance			League		Cup		League Cup		Continental		Total	
Season	Club	League	Apps	Goals	Apps	Goals	Apps	Goals	Apps	Goals	Apps	Goals
Belgium			League		Belgian Cup		League Cup		Europe		Total	
2000-01	Beveren	First Division	19	1					-			
2001-02	Germinal Beerschot	First Division	6	0					-			
South Korea			League		KFA Cup		League Cup		Asia		Total	
2003	Daegu FC	K-League	28	2	3	4	-		-		31	6
2004	Daegu FC	K-League	6	1	0	0	11	0	-		17	1
2005	Daegu FC	K-League	14	1	1	0	0	0	-		15	1
2006	Daegu FC	K-League	20	0	3	1	12	1	-		35	2
2007	Chunnam Dragons	K-League	15	0	4	0	1	0	?	?		
2008	Chunnam Dragons	K-League	18	1	1	0	0	0	5	0	24	1
China PR			League		FA Cup		CSL Cup		Asia		Total	
2009	Changsha Ginde	Chinese Super League	8	0	0	0	0	0	-		8	0
Total	Belgium		25	1								
Total	South Korea		101	5	12	5	24	1				
Total	China PR		8	0							8	0
Career total			134	6								

Sporting positions
Preceded by Song Jung-Hyun	Daegu FC captain 2006	Succeeded by Kim Hyun-Soo
