= Nonato (footballer, born 1979) =

Brazilian footballer

Personal information
- Full name: Raimundo Nonato de Lima Ribeiro
- Date of birth: 5 July 1979 (age 47)
- Place of birth: Viseu, Pará, Brazil
- Height: 1.77 m (5 ft 10 in)
- Position: Forward

Youth career
- 1996: Tuna Luso
- 1997: Iraty

Senior career*
Years	Team	Apps	(Gls)
1997	Ituano		
1998–2003	Bahia	87	(31)
2004–2005	Daegu FC	23	(13)
2005	→ FC Seoul (loan)	11	(2)
2006–2007	Goiás	18	(3)
2007	Fortaleza		
2007	Bahia	37	(19)
2008	Consadole Sapporo	1	(0)
2008	Atlético Goianiense		
2009	Treze		
2009	Mixto		
2009	ABC		
2009–2010	Treze		
2011	Trindade		
2012	Rio Verde	17	(10)
2013–2015	Goianésia	1	(2)
2014	→ Itumbiara (loan)		
2015	→ Treze (loan)		
2016	Goianésia		
2016	Nacional-AM		
2017	Goianésia		
2017	Anapolina		
2017	ABECAT		
2018	Aparecidense		
2018	Goianésia		
2019	Aparecidense		
2019	Trindade		
2020	Vitória da Conquista		
- * Club domestic league appearances and goals

Raimundo Nonato de Lima Ribeiro (born 5 July 1979), known as just Nonato, is a Brazilian former professional footballer who played as a forward. His former clubs include Fortaleza, Goiás, FC Seoul, Daegu FC, Ituano, Iraty, Tuna Luso, Bahia and Trindade. One of his best passages was with Rio Verde, Goias traditional team.

He became top scorer during several rounds, even with the team in the relegation zone. He lost his artillery to Patrique, of Vila Nova, but saved the "Verdão do Sudoeste" (Southwest Green) from "sticking". It is often known as the top scorer Nonato. He had disagreements with the board's "Verdão" and ended up leaving before the last round of state league. He disputed the 2013 Campeonato Goiano for Goianésia.

In 2018, he was also the biggest responsible for Botafogo FR elimination against Aparecidense in the 2018 Copa do Brasil, scoring the first goal and being considered the best player on the match.

== Honours ==
Bahia

- Campeonato Baiano: 1998, 1999, 2001
- Copa do Nordeste: 2001, 2002

Goiás

- Campeonato Goiano: 2006

Fortaleza

- Campeonato Cearense: 2007

Atlético Goianiense

- Campeonato Brasileiro Série C: 2008

Individual

- 2003 Copa do Brasil top scorer: 9 goals
