= Jin Soon-jin =

South Korean footballer (born 1974)

Jin Soon-jin 진순진
Personal information
- Full name: Jin Soon-jin
- Date of birth: 1 March 1974 (age 52)
- Height: 1.80 m (5 ft 11 in)
- Position: Striker

Youth career
- Sangji University

Senior career*
Years	Team	Apps	(Gls)
1997–1998	Hallelujah FC	?	(?)
1999–2003	Anyang LG Cheetahs	69	(16)
2004–2005	Daegu FC	36	(7)
2006	Jeonnam Dragons	1	(0)

International career^{‡}
1998	South Korea	6	(0)
- * Club domestic league appearances and goals as of 11 September 2007 ‡ National team caps and goals as of 11 September 2007

Jin Soon-jin (Korean: 진순진; born 1 March 1974) is a retired South Korean footballer.

== Club career ==
He played for FC Seoul, then known as Anyang LG Cheetahs, Daegu FC and Jeonnam Dragons. In 1999, he had a serious car accident.

== Honours ==
=== Club ===
Anyang LG Cheetahs

- K League (1) 2000
