= Jefferson Feijão (footballer, born 1978) =

Brazilian footballer

Personal information
- Full name: Jefferson Marques da Conceição
- Date of birth: August 21, 1978 (age 48)
- Place of birth: Belo Horizonte, Minas Gerais, Brazil
- Height: 1.81 m (5 ft 11 in)
- Position: Forward

Senior career*
Years	Team	Apps	(Gls)
1998–1999	Cruzeiro		
1999–2000	Desportiva Capixaba		
2001	Vitória SC		
2002	Criciúma		
2002	Goiás	12	(2)
2003	Internacional	38	(7)
2004	Daegu FC	19	(5)
2005	Seongnam Ilhwa Chunma	0	(0)
2005	Goiás		
2006	Botafogo	8	(1)
2007	Avaí		
2008	Liaoning	3	(3)
2009	Changsha Ginde	26	(2)
- * Club domestic league appearances and goals

Jefferson Marques da Conceição (born August 21, 1978), known as Jefferson Feijão, is a Brazilian former footballer.

He played for Cruzeiro, Desportiva Capixaba, Vitória SC, Criciúma, SC Internacional, Daegu FC, Seongnam Ilhwa Chunma, Goiás, Botafogo, Avaí FC, Liaoning and Changsha Ginde.
