= 2004 K League =

Samsung Hauzen K League
- Season: 2004
- Dates: Regular season: 3 April – 20 November 2004; Championship: 5–12 December 2004
- Champions: Suwon Samsung Bluewings (3rd title)
- Champions League: Suwon Samsung Bluewings; Busan I'Cons
- Matches played: 156
- Goals scored: 297 (1.9 per match)
- Best Player: Nádson
- Top goalscorer: Mota (14 goals)

The 2004 K League was the 22nd season of the K League. The previous single format of the league was replaced by two regular stages and playoffs in this season. Each team played a total of 12 matches against every other team in each stage. After both stages were finished, two winners and the top two clubs in the overall table qualified for the playoffs.

== Regular season ==
=== First stage ===
The first place team qualify for the championship playoffs.

Pos	Team	Pld	W	D	L	GF	GA	GD	Pts	Qualification
1	Pohang Steelers	12	6	5	1	16	12	+4	23	Qualification for the playoffs
2	Jeonbuk Hyundai Motors	12	5	5	2	16	9	+7	20	
3	Ulsan Hyundai Horang-i	12	5	5	2	11	8	+3	20	
4	Suwon Samsung Bluewings	12	5	3	4	19	16	+3	18	
5	FC Seoul	12	3	7	2	12	10	+2	16	
6	Jeonnam Dragons	12	3	6	3	17	13	+4	15	
7	Gwangju Sangmu Bulsajo	12	3	6	3	11	12	−1	15	
8	Seongnam Ilhwa Chunma	12	4	3	5	13	16	−3	15	
9	Busan I'Cons	12	2	8	2	7	8	−1	14	
10	Daegu FC	12	3	3	6	19	19	0	12	
11	Daejeon Citizen	12	2	6	4	9	11	−2	12	
12	Bucheon SK	12	1	8	3	7	12	−5	11	
13	Incheon United	12	2	3	7	9	20	−11	9	

Source: RSSSF

=== Second stage ===
The first place team qualified for the championship playoffs.

Pos	Team	Pld	W	D	L	GF	GA	GD	Pts	Qualification
1	Suwon Samsung Bluewings	12	7	2	3	12	8	+4	23	Qualification for the playoffs
2	Jeonnam Dragons	12	6	4	2	12	7	+5	22	
3	Ulsan Hyundai Horang-i	12	6	3	3	11	6	+5	21	
4	Incheon United	12	4	5	3	11	9	+2	17	
5	FC Seoul	12	4	5	3	8	7	+1	17	
6	Busan I'Cons	12	4	4	4	14	11	+3	16	
7	Daegu FC	12	4	4	4	11	12	−1	16	
8	Gwangju Sangmu Bulsajo	12	3	5	4	7	8	−1	14	
9	Seongnam Ilhwa Chunma	12	3	5	4	10	12	−2	14	
10	Bucheon SK	12	3	5	4	12	15	−3	14	
11	Daejeon Citizen	12	4	2	6	9	15	−6	14	
12	Jeonbuk Hyundai Motors	12	3	3	6	7	9	−2	12	
13	Pohang Steelers	12	2	3	7	7	12	−5	9	

Source: RSSSF

=== Overall table ===
The top two teams in the overall table qualified for the championship playoffs.

Pos	Team	Pld	W	D	L	GF	GA	GD	Pts	Qualification
1	Ulsan Hyundai Horang-i	24	11	8	5	22	14	+8	41	Qualification for the playoffs
2	Suwon Samsung Bluewings	24	12	5	7	31	24	+7	41	Second stage winners
3	Jeonnam Dragons	24	9	10	5	29	20	+9	37	Qualification for the playoffs
4	FC Seoul	24	7	12	5	20	17	+3	33	
5	Jeonbuk Hyundai Motors	24	8	8	8	23	18	+5	32	
6	Pohang Steelers	24	8	8	8	23	24	−1	32	First stage winners
7	Busan I'Cons	24	6	12	6	21	19	+2	30	Qualification for the Champions League (Note: Qualified as champions of the FA Cup.)
8	Gwangju Sangmu Bulsajo	24	6	11	7	18	20	−2	29	
9	Seongnam Ilhwa Chunma	24	7	8	9	23	28	−5	29	
10	Daegu FC	24	7	7	10	30	31	−1	28	
11	Daejeon Citizen	24	6	8	10	18	26	−8	26	
12	Incheon United	24	6	8	10	20	29	−9	26	
13	Bucheon SK	24	4	13	7	19	27	−8	25	

Source: RSSSF

== Championship playoffs ==
=== Bracket ===
Semi-finals
Suwon Samsung Bluewings	1
Jeonnam Dragons	0
Pohang Steelers	1
Ulsan Hyundai Horang-i	0

Final
Suwon Samsung Bluewings (p)	0	0	0 (4)
Pohang Steelers	0	0	0 (3)

=== Final table ===
Pos	Team	Qualification
1	Suwon Samsung Bluewings (C)	Qualification for the Champions League
2	Pohang Steelers	
3	Ulsan Hyundai Horang-i	
4	Jeonnam Dragons	

Source: RSSSF
(C) Champions

== Top scorers ==
This list includes goals of the championship playoffs. The official top goalscorer was decided with records of only regular season.

Rank	Player	Club	Goals	Apps
1	(Brazil) Mota	Jeonnam Dragons	14	22
2	(Brazil) Nonato	Daegu FC	13	23
3	(Brazil) Nadson	Suwon Samsung Bluewings	12	26
4	(South Korea) Woo Sung-yong	Pohang Steelers	10	26
5	(South Korea) Kim Eun-jung	FC Seoul	8	24
5	(Brazil) Marcel	Suwon Samsung Bluewings	8	26
7	(Brazil) Zé Carlos	Ulsan Hyundai Horang-i	7	12
7	(Brazil) Ricardo Irineu	Bucheon SK	7	22
9	(Mali) Cheick Oumar Dabo	Bucheon SK	6	15
9	(England) Andy Cooke	Busan I'Cons	6	20
9	(Brazil) Itamar	Jeonnam Dragons	6	22
9	(Brazil) André Luiz Tavares	Pohang Steelers	6	23

== Awards ==
=== Main awards ===
Award	Winner	Club
Most Valuable Player	(Brazil) Nádson	Suwon Samsung Bluewings
Top goalscorer	(Brazil) Mota	Jeonnam Dragons
Top assist provider	(South Korea) Hong Soon-hak	Daegu FC
Rookie of the Year	(South Korea) Moon Min-kui	Pohang Steelers
Manager of the Year	(South Korea) Cha Bum-kun	Suwon Samsung Bluewings

=== Best XI ===
Position	Winner	Club
Goalkeeper	(South Korea) Lee Woon-jae	Suwon Samsung Bluewings
Defenders	(Brazil) Rogério Pinheiro	Pohang Steelers
Defenders	(South Korea) Yoo Kyoung-youl	Ulsan Hyundai Horang-i
Defenders	(Argentina) Javier Martín Musa	Suwon Samsung Bluewings
Defenders	(South Korea) Kwak Hee-ju	Suwon Samsung Bluewings
Midfielders	(South Korea) Kim Dong-jin	FC Seoul
Midfielders	(Brazil) André Luiz Tavares	Pohang Steelers
Midfielders	(South Korea) Kim Do-heon	Suwon Samsung Bluewings
Midfielders	(South Korea) Kim Dae-eui	Suwon Samsung Bluewings
Forwards	(Brazil) Nádson	Suwon Samsung Bluewings
Forwards	(Brazil) Mota	Jeonnam Dragons

== See also ==
- 2004 K League Championship
- 2004 Korean League Cup
- 2004 Korean FA Cup
