= 1997 Korean League Cup =

1997 Adidas Cup
Tournament details
- Country: South Korea
- Dates: 22 March – 19 April 1997
- Teams: 10

Final positions
- Champions: Busan Daewoo Royals (1st title)
- Runners-up: Jeonnam Dragons

Tournament statistics
- Matches played: 45
- Goals scored: 125 (2.78 per match)
- Top goal scorer: Seo Jung-won (8 goals)

The Adidas Cup 1997 was the seventh competition of the Korean League Cup, and one of two Korean League Cups held in 1997.

== Table ==
Pos	Team	Pld	W	D	L	GF	GA	GD	Pts
1	Busan Daewoo Royals (C)	9	4	4	1	11	7	+4	16
2	Jeonnam Dragons	9	3	5	1	16	9	+7	14
3	Ulsan Hyundai Horang-i	9	3	5	1	15	11	+4	14
4	Cheonan Ilhwa Chunma	9	3	5	1	11	10	+1	14
5	Bucheon Yukong	9	3	4	2	17	17	0	13
6	Suwon Samsung Bluewings	9	2	5	2	14	13	+1	11
7	Pohang Steelers	9	2	4	3	9	9	0	10
8	Daejeon Citizen	9	1	4	4	10	14	−4	7
9	Jeonbuk Hyundai Dinos	9	1	4	4	8	13	−5	7
10	Anyang LG Cheetahs	9	0	6	3	14	22	−8	6

Source: RSSSF
(C) Champions

== Matches ==
March 22
15:00 UTC+9

Suwon Samsung Bluewings	1–1	Bucheon Yukong
Lee Byung-keun 90'		Yoon Jung-chun 13'

Suwon Civil Stadium
Attendance: 20,197

March 22
15:00 UTC+9

Jeonbuk Hyundai Dinos	1–1	Jeonnam Dragons
Lee Gyeong-chun 77'		Roh Sang-rae 24' (pen.)

Iksan Stadium
Attendance: 7,541

March 22
15:00 UTC+9

Daejeon Citizen	2–4	Ulsan Hyundai Horang-i
Kim Jung-soo 54' (pen.); Lee Jun 75' (pen.)		Song Ju-seok 27', 31'; Kim Hyun-seok 30'; Seo Dong-won 33'

Daejeon Sports Complex
Attendance: 15,231

March 22
15:00 UTC+9

Anyang LG Cheetahs	1–1	Busan Daewoo Royals
Seo Jung-won 56'		Jung Gwang-seok 63' (pen.)

Changwon Civil Stadium
Attendance: 20,514

March 22
15:00 UTC+9

Cheonan Ilhwa Chunma	1–0	Pohang Steelers
Hwang Yeon-seok 46'

Cheonan Stadium
Attendance: 12,135

March 26
15:00 UTC+9

Jeonbuk Hyundai Dinos	1–1	Bucheon Yukong
Kim Sung-gu 86'		Yun Jung-chun 58'

Iksan Stadium
Attendance: 1,359

March 26
19:00 UTC+9

Daejeon Citizen	1–1	Suwon Samsung Bluewings
Cha Gui-hyun 40'		Cho Hyun-doo 51'

Daejeon Sports Complex
Attendance: 894

March 26
19:00 UTC+9

Jeonnam Dragons	0–0	Busan Daewoo Royals

Gwangyang Football Stadium
Attendance: 17,175

March 26
19:00 UTC+9

Ulsan Hyundai Horang-i	0–0	Cheonan Ilhwa Chunma

Ulsan Sports Complex
Attendance: 11,583

March 26
19:00 UTC+9

Pohang Steelers	1–0	Anyang LG Cheetahs
Konovalov 5'

Steelyard Stadium
Attendance: 12,350

March 29
15:00 UTC+9

Bucheon Yukong	2–1	Daejeon Citizen
Kim Gi-dong 51'; Burdin 89'		Kim Jung-su 77' (pen.)

Mokdong Stadium
Attendance: 13,540

March 29
15:00 UTC+9

Busan Daewoo Royals	1–0	Jeonbuk Hyundai Dinos
Ha Seok-Ju 80'

Masan Stadium
Attendance: 11,226

March 29
15:00 UTC+9

Cheonan Ilhwa Chunma	0–0	Suwon Samsung Bluewings

Gangneung Stadium
Attendance: 8,794

March 29
15:00 UTC+9

Pohang Steelers	1–1	Jeonnam Dragons
Konovalov 5'		Kim Ki-seon 76'

Steelyard Stadium
Attendance: 8,721

March 29
15:00 UTC+9

Anyang LG Cheetahs	1–1	Ulsan Hyundai Horang-i
Seo Jung-won 63'		Kim Hyun-seok 72'

Jinju Stadium
Attendance: 15,124

April 2
16:00 UTC+9

Anyang LG Cheetahs	4–4	Suwon Samsung Bluewings
Seo Jung-won 36' (pen.), 42'; Kabongo 74'; Skachenko 79'		Olăroiu 21'; Lee Kee-keun 52'; Park Kun-ha 65', 67'

Anyang Stadium
Attendance: 4,327

April 2
19:00 UTC+9

Daejeon Citizen	1–3	Cheonan Ilhwa Chunma
Kim Hyun-min 75'		Aborah 50'; Zazi 66'; Jo Il-su 90+3'

Daejeon Sports Complex
Attendance: 1,057

April 3
15:00 UTC+9

Jeonbuk Hyundai Dinos	1–1	Pohang Steelers
Kim Sung-gu 55'		Park Young-seop 69'

Gunsan Stadium
Attendance: 753

April 3
19:00 UTC+9

Ulsan Hyundai Horang-i	3–2	Jeonnam Dragons
Kim Jong-keon 5'; Kim Gi-nam 18', 60'		Roh Sang-rae 23', 62' (pen.)

Ulsan Sports Complex
Attendance: 6,158

April 3
19:00 UTC+9

Bucheon Yukong	0–0	Busan Daewoo Royals

Mokdong Stadium
Attendance: 5,825

April 6
15:00 UTC+9

Bucheon Yukong	1–1	Cheonan Ilhwa Chunma
Lee Chan-haeng 36'		Kim Guk-hwan 90'

Mokdong Stadium
Attendance: 1,398

April 6
15:00 UTC+9

Pohang Steelers	1–2	Busan Daewoo Royals
Park Tae-ha 77'		Jung Jae-kwon 59', 74'

Steelyard Stadium
Attendance: 4,183

April 6
15:00 UTC+9

Daejeon Citizen	2–2	Anyang LG Cheetahs
Cha Gui-hyun 24'; Jung Sung-cheon 75'		Seo Jung-won 39'; Kim Dae-sung 88'

Daejeon Sports Complex
Attendance: 5,374

April 6
15:00 UTC+9

Jeonbuk Hyundai Dinos	0–2	Ulsan Hyundai Horang-i
		Jang Hyung-seok 9'; Lee Hyun-seok 90+3'

Gunsan Stadium
Attendance: 5,723

April 7
15:00 UTC+9

Suwon Samsung Bluewings	2–3	Jeonnam Dragons
Ko Jong-soo 56'; Yoon Sung-hyo 77'		Kim Bong-gil 24'; Roh Sang-rae 29', 73' (pen.)

Suwon Civil Stadium
Attendance: 1,527

April 9
19:00 UTC+9

Pohang Steelers	3–1	Bucheon Yukong
Park Tae-ha 31'; Jeon Kyeong-Joon 36'; Konovalov 58'		Vostrosablin 28'

Steelyard Stadium
Attendance: 3,830

April 9
15:00 UTC+9

Cheonan Ilhwa Chunma	2–2	Anyang LG Cheetahs
Shin Tae-yong 14', 90+14' (pen.)		Yoon Sang-chul 67'; Seo Jung-won 90+6'

Cheonan Stadium
Attendance: 1,425

April 9
15:00 UTC+9

Busan Daewoo Royals	1–1	Ulsan Hyundai Horang-i
Ha Seok-Ju 65'		Shin Hong-gi 77'

Masan Stadium
Attendance: 5,622

April 9
19:00 UTC+9

Jeonnam Dragons	0–0	Daejeon Citizen

Gwangyang Football Stadium
Attendance: 10,218

April 9
19:00 UTC+9

Suwon Samsung Bluewings	2–3	Jeonbuk Hyundai Dinos
Olăroiu 4'; Ko Jong-soo 74'		Kim Bong-hyun 2'; Kim Sung-gu 14'; Savov 21'

Suwon Civil Stadium
Attendance: 5,153

April 12
15:00 UTC+9

Bucheon Yukong	7–1	Anyang LG Cheetahs
Kim Gi-dong 12'; Yoon Jung-chun 26', 30', 71'; Burdin 56'; Lee Won-shik 59', 90+1'		Seo Jung-won 44'

Mokdong Stadium
Attendance: 3,598

April 12
15:00 UTC+9

Ulsan Hyundai Horang-i	1–1	Pohang Steelers
Shin Hong-gi 54'		An Ik-soo 74'

Ulsan Sports Complex
Attendance: 8,751

April 12
15:00 UTC+9

Jeonnam Dragons	1–1	Cheonan Ilhwa Chunma
Kim Sang-ho 21'		Rubenilson 60'

Mokpo Stadium
Attendance: 11,358

April 12
15:00 UTC+9

Suwon Samsung Bluewings	3–1	Busan Daewoo Royals
Laktionov 15'; Kim Joo-sung 61' (o.g.); Lee Kee-keun 87'		Woo Sung-yong 83'

Suwon Civil Stadium
Attendance: 8,765

April 12
15:00 UTC+9

Daejeon Citizen	2–0	Jeonbuk Hyundai Dinos
Gong O-kyun 12'; Cha Gui-hyun 57'

Daejeon Sports Complex
Attendance: 1,725

April 16
19:00 UTC+9

Bucheon Yukong	4–3	Ulsan Hyundai Horang-i
Kim Gi-dong 1'; Lee Won-shik 19', 58', 66'		Kim Hyun-seok 27' (pen.); Kim Jong-keon 37'; Song Ju-seok 60'

Mokdong Stadium
Attendance: 4,823

April 16
16:00 UTC+9

Anyang LG Cheetahs	1–2	Jeonnam Dragons
Kim Dae-sung 32'		Kim Bong-gil 45'; Kim Ki-seon 85'

Anyang Stadium
Attendance: 1,217

April 16
19:00 UTC+9

Suwon Samsung Bluewings	1–0	Pohang Steelers
Cho Hyun-doo 2'

Suwon Civil Stadium
Attendance: 6,768

April 16
16:00 UTC+9

Cheonan Ilhwa Chunma	2–1	Jeonbuk Hyundai Dinos
Aborah 13'; Hwang Yeon-seok 45'		Parakhnevych 56'

Cheonan Stadium
Attendance: 1,005

April 16
15:00 UTC+9

Busan Daewoo Royals	1–0	Daejeon Citizen
Kim Sang-mun 11'

Masan Stadium
Attendance: 2,562

April 19
15:00 UTC+9

Jeonnam Dragons	6–0	Bucheon Yukong
Kim Bong-gil 1', 79'; Roh Sang-rae 18'; Kim Sang-ho 54'; Kim Do-keun 73'; Kim Hae-guk 83'

Gwangyang Football Stadium
Attendance: 11,150

April 19
15:00 UTC+9

Ulsan Hyundai Horang-i	0–0	Suwon Samsung Bluewings

Ulsan Sports Complex
Attendance: 7,523

April 19
15:00 UTC+9

Jeonbuk Hyundai Dinos	2–2	Anyang LG Cheetahs
Choi Jin-cheul 64'; Kim Sung-gu 70'		Seo Jung-won 21' (pen.); Skachenko 68'

Iksan Stadium
Attendance: 827

April 19
15:00 UTC+9

Pohang Steelers	1–1	Daejeon Citizen
Konovalov 51'		Jung Sung-cheon 33'

Steelyard Stadium
Attendance: 3,850

April 19
15:00 UTC+9

Busan Daewoo Royals	4–1	Cheonan Ilhwa Chunma
Ha Seok-Ju 5', 56'; Woo Sung-yong 26'; Lee Jang-kwan 67'		Rubenilson 87'

Masan Stadium
Attendance: 4,922

== Awards ==
Award	Player	Team	Points
Top goalscorer	(South Korea) Seo Jung-won	Anyang LG Cheetahs	8 goals
Top assist provider	(South Korea) Ko Jong-soo	Suwon Samsung Bluewings	4 assists

== See also ==
- 1997 in South Korean football
- 1997 Korean League Cup (Supplementary Cup)
- 1997 K League
- 1997 Korean FA Cup
