= 1999 Korean FA Cup =

1999 Sambo Computer FA Cup

Tournament details
- Country: South Korea
- Teams: 20

Final positions
- Champions: Cheonan Ilhwa Chunma (1st title)
- Runners-up: Jeonbuk Hyundai Dinos

Tournament statistics
- Matches played: 19
- Goals scored: 58 (3.05 per match)
- Top goal scorer: Choi Yong-soo (5 goals)

Awards
- Best player: Park Nam-yeol

1999 Korean FA Cup, known as the 1999 Sambo Computer FA Cup, was the fourth edition of the Korean FA Cup.

== Bracket ==
Round of 16
Jeonbuk Hyundai Dinos	3
Daejeon Citizen	2
Jeonnam Dragons	5
Seoul City	0
Ulsan Hyundai Horang-i	4
Hyundai Mipo Dockyard	2
Korea Railroad (a.e.t.)	1
Jeonju University	0
Busan Daewoo Royals	1
Cheonan Ilhwa Chunma	3
Pohang Steelers	1
Sangmu FC	2
Anyang LG Cheetahs	4
Dankook University	1
Bucheon SK	1
Soongsil University	0

Quarter-finals
Jeonbuk Hyundai Dinos (a.e.t.)	2
Jeonnam Dragons	1
Ulsan Hyundai Horang-i	3
Korea Railroad	1
Cheonan Ilhwa Chunma	1
Sangmu FC	0
Anyang LG Cheetahs	2
Bucheon SK	0

Semi-finals
Jeonbuk Hyundai Dinos (p)	0 (5)
Ulsan Hyundai Horang-i	0 (3)
Cheonan Ilhwa Chunma	2
Anyang LG Cheetahs	1

Final
Jeonbuk Hyundai Dinos	0
Cheonan Ilhwa Chunma	3

== First round ==
November 11	Jeonbuk Hyundai Dinos	2–1	Honam University	Gwangju Mudeung Stadium
	Rogerio Prateat 48'; Park Sung-bae 57'		Kim Seung-hyun 9'

November 11	Suwon Samsung Bluewings	0–1	Korea National Railroad	Gwangju Mudeung Stadium
			Kim Chan-seok 67'

November 11	Cheonan Ilhwa Chunma	4–0	Ajou University	Changwon Civil Stadium
	Shin Tae-yong 23'; Kim Young-chul 44'; Park Nam-yeol 69'; Jang Dae-il 84'

November 11	Bucheon SK	4–0	Gangneung City	Changwon Civil Stadium
	Kim Gi-dong 1', 78'; Yoon Jung-chun 4', 55'

== Round of 16 ==
November 12	Jeonnam Dragons	5–0	Seoul City	Gwangju Mudeung Stadium
	Choi Moon-sik 20'; Cezinha 27', 57'; Roh Sang-rae 29'; Maciel 38'

November 12	Ulsan Hyundai Horang-i	4–2	Hyundai Mipo Dockyard	Gwangju Mudeung Stadium
	Jang Cheol-min 5'; Kim Hyun-seok 24'; Ahn Hong-min 28'; Je Young-jin 64'		Ahn Moo-yeon 49'; Kim Young-gi 55'

November 12	Pohang Steelers	1–2	Sangmu FC	Changwon Civil Stadium
	Kim Se-in 77'		Lee Min-sung 27'; Lee Yong-woo 50'

November 12	Anyang LG Cheetahs	4–1	Dankook University	Changwon Civil Stadium
	Choi Yong-soo 4' (pen.), 12', 63'; Wang Jung-hyun 27'		Kim Jang-gon 9'

November 14	Korea National Railroad	1–0 (a.e.t.)	Jeonju University	Gwangju Mudeung Stadium
	Lee Kwang-jin 104'

November 14	Jeonbuk Hyundai Dinos	3–2	Daejeon Citizen	Gwangju Mudeung Stadium
	Byun Jae-seob 56'; Park Sung-bae 74'; Oh Kwang-hoon 79'		Jung Seong-cheon 26'; Gong O-Kyun 58'

November 14	Bucheon SK	1–0	Soongsil University	Changwon Civil Stadium
	Lee Won-sik 42'

November 14	Cheonan Ilhwa Chunma	3–1	Busan Daewoo Royals	Changwon Civil Stadium
	Lee Sang-yoon 32'; Jang Dae-il 78' (pen.); Park Nam-yeol 81' (pen.)		Lee Ki-bu 58'

== Quarter-finals ==
November 16	Jeonbuk Hyundai Dinos	2–1 (a.e.t.)	Jeonnam Dragons	Gwangju Mudeung Stadium
	Park Sung-bae 84' (pen.) 119'		Kim Jong-hyun 81'

November 16	Ulsan Hyundai Horang-i	3–1	Korea National Railroad	Gwangju Mudeung Stadium
	Ahn Hong-min 22', 49'; Victor Shaka 90'		Lee Kwang-jin 31'

November 16	Cheonan Ilhwa Chunma	1–0	Sangmu FC	Changwon Civil Stadium
	Kim Young-chul 10'

November 16	Anyang LG Cheetahs	2–0	Bucheon SK	Changwon Civil Stadium
	Choi Yong-soo 35' (pen.), 81'

== Semi-finals ==
November 19	Jeonbuk Hyundai Dinos	0–0 (a.e.t.) (5–3 p)	Ulsan Hyundai Horang-i	Jeju Stadium

November 19	Cheonan Ilhwa Chunma	2–1	Anyang LG Cheetahs	Jeju Stadium
	Shin Tae-yong 52' (pen.), 75'		Yelyshev 70'

== Final ==
November 21	Cheonan Ilhwa Chunma	3–0	Jeonbuk Hyundai Dinos	Jeju Stadium
	Shin Tae-yong 31' (pen.); Park Nam-yeol 58', 84'

== Awards ==
Award	Winner	Team
Most Valuable Player	(South Korea) Park Nam-yeol	Cheonan Ilhwa Chunma
Top goalscorer	(South Korea) Choi Yong-soo	Anyang LG Cheetahs

== See also ==
- 1999 in South Korean football
- 1999 K League
- 1999 Korean Semi-professional Football League
- 1999 Korean League Cup
- 1999 Korean League Cup (Supplementary Cup)
