= 1996 Korean FA Cup =

Tournament details
- Country: South Korea
- Teams: 16

Final positions
- Champions: Pohang Atoms (1st title)
- Runners-up: Suwon Samsung Bluewings

Tournament statistics
- Matches played: 15
- Goals scored: 48 (3.2 per match)
- Top goal scorer: Denis Laktionov (4 goals)

Awards
- Best player: Cho Jin-ho

The 1996 Korean FA Cup was the first edition of the Korean FA Cup Korean football tournament.

== Bracket ==
Round of 16
Suwon Samsung Bluewings (a.e.t.) | 4
Yonsei University | 3
Cheonan Ilhwa Chunma | 3
E-Land Puma | 2
Bucheon Yukong | 5
Chung-Ang University | 3
Jeonbuk Hyundai Dinos (p) | 1 (4)
Sangmu FC | 1 (1)
Pohang Atoms | 1
Kookmin Bank | 0
Ulsan Hyundai Horang-i | 2
Anyang LG Cheetahs | 1
Jeonnam Dragons | 1
Yeungnam University | 0
Busan Daewoo Royals | 1
Hongik University | 0

Quarter-finals
Suwon Samsung Bluewings | 5
Cheonan Ilhwa Chunma | 2
Bucheon Yukong (p) | 3 (3)
Jeonbuk Hyundai Dinos | 3 (2)
Pohang Atoms | 1
Jeonnam Dragons | 0
Ulsan Hyundai Horang-i | 1
Busan Daewoo Royals | 0

Semi-finals
Suwon Samsung Bluewings | 3
Bucheon Yukong | 1
Pohang Atoms | 1
Ulsan Hyundai Horang-i | 0

Final
Suwon Samsung Bluewings | 0 (6)
Pohang Atoms (p) | 0 (7)

== Round of 16 ==
| November 30 | Suwon Samsung Bluewings | 4–3 (a.e.t.) | Yonsei University | Suwon Civil Stadium |
| | Laktionov 8' (pen.), 33', 91'; Ko Jong-soo 13' | | Shin Jin-won 29'; Sung Han-soo 43'; Seo Dong-won 84' (pen.) |

| November 30 | Cheonan Ilhwa Chunma | 3–2 | E-Land Puma | Cheonan Oryong Stadium |
| | Lee Ki-bum 18'; Lee Tae-hong 38'; Lee Sang-yoon 61' | | Je Yong-sam 24'; Woo Je-won 87' |

| November 30 | Bucheon Yukong | 5–3 | Chung-Ang University | Cheongju Stadium |
| | Baek Seung-ho 6'; Burdin 12'; Cho Jung-hyun 40', 55'; Yoo Sang-soo 86' | | Kim Jung-soo 32'; Choi Jung-min 62'; Cjo Sung-chan 82' |

| November 30 | Jeonbuk Hyundai Dinos | 1–1 (a.e.t.) (4–1 p) | Sangmu FC | Iksan Public Stadium |
| | Kim Bong-hyun 62' | | Choi Moon-sik 47' |

| December 1 | Pohang Atoms | 1–0 | Kookmin Bank | Pohang Steelyard Stadium |
| | Cho Jin-ho 79' |

| December 1 | Ulsan Hyundai Horang-i | 2–1 | Anyang LG Cheetahs | Ulsan Civil Stadium |
| | Hwang Seung-ju 7'; Jung Jung-soo 10' | | No Ju-seop 65' |

| December 1 | Jeonnam Dragons | 1–0 | Yeungnam University | Gwangyang Stadium |
| | Sow 84' |

| December 1 | Busan Daewoo Royals | 1–0 | Hongik University | Masan Stadium |
| | Kim Hyun-soo 70' |

== Quarter-finals ==
| December 2 | Suwon Samsung Bluewings | 5–2 | Cheonan Ilhwa Chunma | Jinju Civil Stadium |
| | Cho Hyun 4', 76'; Cho Hyun-doo 22', 65'; Ko Jong-soo 73' | | Lee Sang-yoon 12'; Hwang Yeon-seok 27' |

| December 2 | Bucheon Yukong | 3–3 (a.e.t.) (3–2 p) | Jeonbuk Hyundai Dinos | Jinju Civil Stadium |
| | Yoon Jung-hwan 1', 73'; Yoo Sang-soo 35' | | Savov 11', 37'; Parakhnevych 38' |

| December 3 | Pohang Atoms | 1–0 | Jeonnam Dragons | Jinju Civil Stadium |
| | Cho Jin-ho 70' |

| December 3 | Ulsan Hyundai Horang-i | 1–0 | Busan Daewoo Royals | Jinju Civil Stadium |
| | Kim Jong-sik 77' |

== Semi-finals ==
| December 5 | Suwon Samsung Bluewings | 3–1 | Bucheon Yukong | Jinju Civil Stadium |
| | Ko Jong-soo 25'; Laktionov 38'; Lee Jin-haeng 85' | | Burdin 35' |

| December 5 | Pohang Atoms | 1–0 | Ulsan Hyundai Horang-i | Jinju Civil Stadium |
| | Cho Jin-ho 80' |

== Final ==
| December 7 | Pohang Atoms | 0–0 (a.e.t.) (7–6 p) | Suwon Samsung Bluewings | Jinju Civil Stadium |

== Awards ==
| Award | Winner | Team |
|---|---|---|
| Most Valuable Player | (South Korea) Cho Jin-ho | Pohang Atoms |
| Top goalscorer | (Russia) Denis Laktionov | Suwon Samsung Bluewings |

== See also ==
- 1996 in South Korean football
- 1996 K League
- 1996 Korean League Cup
