= List of football stadiums in South Korea =

The following is a list of football stadiums in South Korea, ordered by capacity. All stadiums with a seating capacity of 10,000 or more are included.

== Current stadiums ==
Image	Stadium	Capacity	City	Province	Home team(s)	Opened
	Seoul World Cup Stadium	66,704	Seoul		FC Seoul	2001
	Daegu Stadium	66,422	Daegu			2001
	Seoul Olympic Stadium	65,599	Seoul			1984
	Busan Asiad Main Stadium	53,769	Busan		Busan IPark	2001
	Incheon Munhak Stadium	49,084	Incheon			2001
	Suwon World Cup Stadium	44,031	Suwon	Gyeonggi	Suwon Samsung Bluewings	2001
	Goyang Stadium	41,311	Goyang	Gyeonggi		2003
	Daejeon World Cup Stadium	40,535	Daejeon		Daejeon Hana Citizen	2001
	Gwangju World Cup Stadium	40,245	Gwangju		Gwangju FC	2001
	Ulsan Munsu Football Stadium	37,897	Ulsan		Ulsan HD	2001
	Yongin Mireu Stadium	37,155	Yongin		Yongin FC	2018
	Hwaseong Stadium	35,265	Hwaseong	Gyeonggi	Hwaseong FC	2011
	Ansan Wa~ Stadium	35,000	Ansan	Gyeonggi	Ansan Greeners	2007
	Bucheon Stadium	34,456	Bucheon	Gyeonggi	Bucheon FC 1995	2001
	Jeonju World Cup Stadium	34,207	Jeonju	North Jeolla	Jeonbuk Hyundai Motors	2001
	Gumi Civic Stadium	33,050	Gumi	North Gyeongsang		1984
	Jeju World Cup Stadium	29,791	Seogwipo	Jeju	Jeju SK	2001
	Incheon Asiad Main Stadium	29,376	Incheon			2014
	Jeonju Sports Complex Stadium	28,000	Jeonju	North Jeolla		1980
	Uijeongbu Stadium	28,000	Uijeongbu	Gyeonggi		2002
	Jinnam Stadium	28,000	Yeosu	South Jeolla		1990
	Changwon Stadium	27,085	Changwon	South Gyeongsang	Changwon City	1993
	Seongnam Sports Complex	27,000	Seongnam	Gyeonggi		1984
	Cheonan Stadium	26,000	Cheonan	South Chungcheong	Cheonan City	2001
	Gimcheon Stadium	25,000	Gimcheon	North Gyeongsang	Gimcheon Sangmu	2000
	Gimhae Stadium	25,000	Gimhae	South Gyeongsang	Gimhae FC	1973
	Iksan Public Stadium	25,000	Iksan	North Jeolla		1991
	Sokcho Stadium	25,000	Sokcho	Gangwon		1994
	Jecheon Stadium	25,000	Jecheon	North Chungcheong		1988
	Nonsan Stadium	25,000	Nonsan	South Chungcheong		1997
	Paju Stadium	23,000	Paju	Gyeonggi	Paju Frontier	2004
	Pohang Sports Complex	22,934	Pohang	North Gyeongsang		1971
	Yangsan Stadium	22,061	Yangsan	South Gyeongsang		2002
	Suncheon Stadium	22,000	Suncheon	South Jeolla		1987
	Yeoju Stadium	21,600	Yeoju	Gyeonggi		1990
	Masan Stadium	21,484	Masan	South Gyeongsang		1982
	Gangneung Stadium	21,146	Gangneung	Gangwon	Gangwon FC	1984
	Incheon Football Stadium	20,891	Incheon		Incheon United	2012
	Daejeon Hanbat Stadium	20,618	Daejeon			1964
	Yeongju Stadium	20,500	Yeongju	North Gyeongsang		1986
	Jinju Stadium	20,116	Jinju	South Gyeongsang		1968
	Chuncheon Songam Stadium	20,000	Chuncheon	Gangwon	Gangwon FC, Chuncheon FC	2009
	Boryeong Stadium	20,000	Boryeong	South Chungcheong		1995
	Changnyeong Stadium	20,000	Changnyeong	South Gyeongsang		1985
	Dongducheon City Stadium	20,000	Dongducheon	Gyeonggi		1997
	Jinju Civic Stadium	20,000	Jinju	South Gyeongsang		1968
	Taebaek Stadium	20,000	Taebaek	Gangwon		1992
	Tongyeong Stadium	20,000	Tongyeong	South Gyeongsang		1937
	Usul Stadium	20,000	Haenam	South Jeolla		1998
	Yeongcheon Stadium	20,000	Yeongcheon	North Gyeongsang		1987
	Wonju Stadium	20,000	Wonju	Gangwon		1980
	Chilgok Stadium	19,699	Chilgok	North Gyeongsang		2012
	Ulsan Stadium	19,471	Ulsan		Ulsan Citizen	2005
	Icheon City Stadium	19,428	Icheon	Gyeonggi		2001
	Seosan City Stadium	19,000	Seosan	South Chungcheong	Seosan Omega	2001
	Yeosu Mangma Stadium	17,750	Yeosu	South Jeolla		1997
	Andong Stadium	17,500	Andong	North Gyeongsang		1979
	Yi Sun-sin Stadium	17,376	Asan	South Chungcheong	Chungnam Asan	2008
	Anyang Stadium	17,143	Anyang	Gyeonggi	FC Anyang	1986
	Donghae Stadium	16,800	Donghae	Gangwon		1993
	Gongju Stadium	16,800	Gongju	South Chungcheong		1990
	Jeju Stadium	16,387	Jeju City	Jeju		1968
	Cheongju Sports Complex	16,280	Cheongju	North Chungcheong	Chungbuk Cheongju	1965
	Tancheon Sports Complex	16,146	Seongnam	Gyeonggi	Seongnam FC	2002
	Pohang Steel Yard	15,546	Pohang	North Gyeongsang	Pohang Steelers	1990
	Mokdong Stadium	15,511	Seoul		Seoul E-Land	1989
	Hyochang Stadium	15,194	Seoul			1960
	Changwon Football Center	15,071	Changwon	South Gyeongsang	Gyeongnam FC, Changwon FC	2009
	Gimhae Sports Complex	15,066	Gimhae	South Gyeongsang	Gimhae FC 2008	2024
	Sangju Civic Stadium	15,042	Sangju	North Gyeongsang		1992
	Chungju Stadium	15,000	Chungju	North Chungcheong		1979
	Haman Stadium	15,000	Haman	South Gyeongsang		1999
	Alpensia Ski Jumping Stadium	13,500	Pyeongchang	Gangwon		2008
	Gwangyang Football Stadium	13,496	Gwangyang	South Jeolla	Jeonnam Dragons	1993
	Daegu iM Bank Park	12,419	Daegu		Daegu FC	2019
	Busan Gudeok Stadium	12,349	Busan		Busan Transportation Corporation, Busan IPark	1928
	Gyeongju Civic Stadium	12,199	Gyeongju	North Gyeongsang	Gyeongju KHNP	1979
	Suwon Stadium	11,808	Suwon	Gyeonggi	Suwon FC, Suwon FC Women	1971
	Gimpo Solteo Football Field	10,037	Gimpo	Gyeonggi	Gimpo FC	2015
	Gwangju Football Stadium	10,007	Gwangju			2020

== See also ==
- List of Asian stadiums by capacity
- List of association football stadiums by capacity
- List of sports venues in South Korea
- List of baseball stadiums in South Korea
