= 1997 Korean FA Cup =

Tournament details
- Country: South Korea
- Teams: 20

Final positions
- Champions: Jeonnam Dragons (1st title)
- Runners-up: Cheonan Ilhwa Chunma

Tournament statistics
- Matches played: 19
- Goals scored: 68 (3.58 per match)
- Top goal scorer: Roh Sang-rae (6 goals)

Awards
- Best player: Kim Jung-hyuk

The 1997 Korean FA Cup was the second edition of the Korean FA Cup.

== Bracket ==
Round of 16
Bucheon SK	2
Industrial Bank of Korea	1
Jeonnam Dragons	2
Daejeon Citizen	0
Anyang LG Cheetahs	3
Korea University	2
Suwon Samsung Bluewings	2
Hanil Bank	1
Pohang Steelers	2
Yonsei University	1
Korea Housing Bank	3
Chung-Ang University	2
Jeonbuk Hyundai Dinos	2
Cheonan Ilhwa Chunma (a.e.t.)	3
Ulsan Hyundai Horang-i	3
E-Land Puma	1

Quarter-finals
Bucheon SK	2
Jeonnam Dragons	3
Anyang LG Cheetahs (p)	2 (3)
Suwon Samsung Bluewings	2 (2)
Pohang Steelers	7
Korea Housing Bank	0
Cheonan Ilhwa Chunma	1
Ulsan Hyundai Horang-i	0

Semi-finals
Jeonnam Dragons (a.e.t.)	4
Anyang LG Cheetahs	3
Pohang Steelers	1
Cheonan Ilhwa Chunma	1

Final
Jeonnam Dragons	1
Cheonan Ilhwa Chunma	0

== First round ==
November 20	Cheonan Ilhwa Chunma	2–0	Ajou University	Cheonan Oryong Stadium
	Shin Tae-yong 25' (pen.); Lee Sang-yoon 28'

November 20	Anyang LG Cheetahs	3–2	Sangmu FC	Anyang Stadium
	Elyshev 31' (pen.); Shaka 71'; Seo Jung-won 90'		Park Nam-yeol 7'; Choi Moon-sik 52'

November 20	Jeonnam Dragons	2–0	University of Ulsan	Gwangyang Stadium
	Roh Sang-rae 3', 57' (pen.)

November 20	Busan Daewoo Royals	1–2	Korea Housing Bank	Masan Stadium
	Manić 73' (pen.)		Lee Soo-jae 49'; Lee Jong-joo 114'

== Round of 16 ==
November 21	Bucheon SK	2–1	Industrial Bank of Korea	Seoul Mokdong Stadium
	Yoo Jae-doo 53' (o.g.); Mikaelyan 54'		Choi Dong-sik 70'

November 21	Suwon Samsung Bluewings	2–1	Hanil Bank	Suwon Civil Stadium
	Laktionov 58'; Lee Jin-haeng 76'		Choi Sun-geol 41'

November 21	Pohang Steelers	2–1	Yonsei University	Pohang Steelyard Stadium
	Tomou 18', 81'		Jung Sang-nam 65'

November 22	Ulsan Hyundai Horang-i	3–1	E-Land Puma	Ulsan Complex Stadium
	Kim Hyun-seok 47', 77'; Kim Ki-nam 89'		Kang Sung-ho 67'

November 22	Jeonnam Dragons	2–0	Daejeon Citizen	Gwangyang Stadium
	Kim Sang-ho 15'; Roh Sang-rae 54'

November 22	Jeonbuk Hyundai Dinos	2–3 (a.e.t.)	Cheonan Ilhwa Chunma	Jeonju Stadium
	Kim Do-hoon 13'; Lee Tae-hoon 88'		Shin Tae-yong 8'; Kim Yi-ju 24'; Park Kwang-hyun 98'

November 22	Korea Housing Bank	3–2	Chung-Ang University	Masan Stadium
	Choi Eun-seok 41'; Lee Jong-joo 56'; Seo Kang-woon 74'		Jang Ki-bong 22', 39'

November 22	Anyang LG Cheetahs	3–2	Korea University	Anyang Stadium
	Elyshev 13'; Lee Won-jun 23'; Kim Jong-yeon 83'		Lee Jung-min 29'; Park Kyung-hwan 49'

== Quarter-finals ==
November 24	Pohang Steelers	7–0	Korea Housing Bank	Gwangju Mudeung Stadium
	Park Ji-ho 15', 28'; Park Tae-ha 59'; Tomou 65'; Oostrom 77'; Jang Young-hoon 86'; Park Young-seob 90'

November 24	Cheonan Ilhwa Chunma	1–0	Ulsan Hyundai Horang-i	Gwangju Mudeung Stadium
	Kim Yi-ju 52'

November 25	Bucheon SK	2–3	Jeonnam Dragons	Gwangju Mudeung Stadium
	Park Sung-cheol 32'; Vostrosablin 49'		Skachenko 4'; Lim Jae-sun 27'; Roh Sang-rae 77'

November 25	Anyang LG Cheetahs	2–2 (a.e.t.) (3–2 p)	Suwon Samsung Bluewings	Gwangju Mudeung Stadium
	Seo Jung-won 1'; Kim Jong-yeon 56'		Cho Hyun-doo 34'; Olăroiu 38'

== Semi-finals ==
November 27	Pohang Steelers	0–1	Cheonan Ilhwa Chunma	Gwangju Mudeung Stadium
			Shin Tae-yong 63'

November 27	Jeonnam Dragons	4–3 (a.e.t.)	Anyang LG Cheetahs	Gwangju Mudeung Stadium
	Skachenko 18', 60'; Roh Sang-rae 26'; Maciel 109'		Ünsal 21'; Seo Jung-won 78', 83'

== Final ==
November 29	Jeonnam Dragons	1–0	Cheonan Ilhwa Chunma	Gwangju Mudeung Stadium
	Roh Sang-rae 67'

== Awards ==
Award	Winner	Team
Most Valuable Player	(South Korea) Kim Jung-hyuk	Jeonnam Dragons
Top goalscorer	(South Korea) Roh Sang-rae	Jeonnam Dragons

== See also ==
- 1997 in South Korean football
- 1997 K League
- 1997 Korean League Cup
- 1997 Korean League Cup (Supplementary Cup)
