= 2003 Korean FA Cup =

2003 Hana Bank FA Cup

Tournament details
- Country: South Korea

Final positions
- Champions: Jeonbuk Hyundai Motors (2nd title)
- Runners-up: Jeonnam Dragons

Tournament statistics
- Top goal scorer(s): Edmilson; Sin Byung-ho; Kim Dae-wook; Lee Sang-il (4 goals each)

Awards
- Best player: Edmilson

The 2003 Korean FA Cup, known as the 2003 Hana Bank FA Cup, was the eighth edition of the Korean FA Cup.

== Qualifying rounds ==
=== Regional round ===
==== Group 1 ====
Group A of Seoul.

Pos	Team	Pld	W	D	L	GF	GA	GD	Pts	UNI	BUK	SSM	VIC	OEM	YNH
1	Union	5	4	0	1	35	8	+27	12	—	4–2	0–2	6–2	10–2	15–0
2	Bukak Club	5	4	0	1	21	6	+15	12		—	7–1	3–0	2–0	7–1
3	Seongsim	5	3	0	2	15	13	+2	9			—	2–3	4–2	6–1
4	Victor SC	5	2	0	3	21	18	+3	6				—	3–5	13–2
5	Oemun	5	2	0	3	15	21	−6	6					—	6–2
6	Yeonhui	5	0	0	5	6	47	−41	0						—

Source: RSSSF

==== Group 2 ====
Group B of Seoul.

Pos	Team	Pld	W	D	L	GF	GA	GD	Pts	CHA	SYS	HWA	KOA	SQU	IAK
1	Challenger	5	4	1	0	27	11	+16	13	—	4–4	4–1	7–2	4–3	8–1
2	System	5	3	2	0	24	15	+9	11		—	5–3	2–2	7–4	6–2
3	Hwangso	5	3	0	2	27	13	+14	9			—	6–2	6–2	11–0
4	Korail Area	5	1	2	2	13	19	−6	5				—	3–3	4–1
5	Squad SC	5	1	1	3	24	22	+2	4					—	12–2
6	IAKAS	5	0	0	5	6	41	−35	0						—

Source: RSSSF

==== Group 3 ====
Group C of Seoul.

Pos	Team	Pld	W	D	L	GF	GA	GD	Pts	SCM	SCP	ERU	NJO	HME	BLC
1	Soccer Mania	5	5	0	0	44	3	+41	15	—	4–1	7–0	9–1	13–0	11–1
2	Scorpions	5	4	0	1	28	10	+18	12		—	7–1	9–0	5–2	6–3
3	Eruja	5	2	1	2	11	19	−8	7			—	2–2	2–1	6–2
4	N.Joven	5	1	2	2	9	23	−14	5				—	3–0	3–3
5	Hanmaeum	5	1	0	4	10	24	−14	3					—	7–1
6	Black Cats	5	0	1	4	10	33	−23	1						—

Source: RSSSF

==== Group 4 ====
Group of southwest Gyeonggi.

Pos	Team	Pld	W	D	L	GF	GA	GD	Pts	JEI	ACE	HSU	ANS	IMP	STR
1	JEI Education	5	4	1	0	37	1	+36	13	—	0–0	5–0	4–0	20–1	8–0
2	Ace	5	4	1	0	23	8	+15	13		—	5–3	3–1	10–2	5–2
3	Hwaseong Unicorns	5	3	0	2	17	14	+3	9			—	6–1	2–0 (Note: Awarded a 2–0 win to Hwaseong Unicorns due to non-attendance of Impact.)	6–3
4	FC Ansan	5	2	0	3	14	16	−2	6				—	6–2	6–1
5	Impact	5	1	0	4	7	38	−31	3					—	2–0
6	Stripe	5	0	0	5	6	27	−21	0						—

Source: RSSSF

==== Group 5 ====
Group of northern Gyeonggi.

Pos	Team	Pld	W	D	L	GF	GA	GD	Pts	BSC	JCL	YNJ	RAC	HWR	PJD
1	Bongshin Club	5	4	0	1	29	8	+21	12	—	3–4	3–0	5–2	3–2	15–0
2	J Club	5	3	1	1	18	16	+2	10		—	1–5	4–4	4–2	5–2
3	Yangju FC	5	2	2	1	12	9	+3	8			—	2–2	3–3	2–0
4	Race	5	2	2	1	14	13	+1	8				—	2–0	4–2
5	Hanwoori	5	1	1	3	9	12	−3	4					—	2–0 (Note: Awarded a 2–0 win to Hanwoori due to non-attendance of Paju Dragons.)
6	Paju Dragons	5	0	0	5	4	28	−24	0						—

Source: RSSSF

==== Group 6 ====
Group of eastern Gyeonggi and Gangwon.

Pos	Team	Pld	W	D	L	GF	GA	GD	Pts	EOS	MJU	SJU	ICD	DGL	SNJ
1	Guri EOS	5	4	0	1	17	5	+12	12	—	3–2	2–0 (Note: Awarded a 2–0 win to Guri EOS due to non-attendance of Sangji University Halfline.)	(0–2)	4–0	8–1
2	Myongji Unicorns	5	2	1	2	16	9	+7	7		—	3–3	7–1	4–0	0–2 (Note: Awarded a 2–0 win to Seongnam Jeongbo due to non-attendance of Myongji Unicorns.)
3	Sangji University Halfline	5	2	1	2	15	11	+4	7			—	3–1	4–5	5–0
4	Icheon Daewol	5	2	0	3	12	18	−6	6	(0–2)			—	5–3	5–3
5	Daegwallyeong FC	5	2	0	3	11	19	−8	6					—	3–2
6	Seongnam Jeongbo	5	1	0	4	8	21	−13	3						—

Source: RSSSF

==== Group 7 ====
Group of Daejeon, Chungbuk and Jeonbuk.

Pos	Team	Pld	W	D	L	GF	GA	GD	Pts	CJS	HUR	HRO	DJU	GCM	BUA
1	Chungju Solveige	5	5	0	0	20	6	+14	15	—	4–1	4–2	2–0 (Note: Daejeon United withdrew from the competition before playing.)	2–0 (Note: GCM Club withdrew from the competition before playing.)	8–3
2	Hanuri	5	4	0	1	12	4	+8	12		—	5–0	2–0	2–0	2–0 (Note: Buan Holy withdrew from the competition after their first match against Chungju Solveige.)
3	Hero	5	3	0	2	8	9	−1	9			—	2–0	2–0	2–0
4	Daejeon United	5	0	0	5	0	10	−10	0				—	(0–2)	(0–2)
5	GCM Club	5	0	0	5	0	10	−10	0				(0–2)	—	(0–2)
6	Buan Holy	5	0	0	5	3	16	−13	0				(0–2)	(0–2)	—

Source: RSSSF

==== Group 8 ====
Group of Busan and Gyeongnam.

Pos	Team	Pld	W	D	L	GF	GA	GD	Pts	DAU	TYC	ELY	WHS	HAS	WJC
1	Dau Club	5	5	0	0	41	6	+35	15	—	4–1	13–4	9–0	6–0	9–1
2	Tongyeong City	5	4	0	1	37	7	+30	12		—	7–1	9–0	6–1	14–1
3	Elysion	5	3	0	2	23	28	−5	9			—	7–2	4–2	7–4
4	White Snow	5	2	0	3	8	26	−18	6				—	2–0 (Note: Awarded a 2–0 win to White Snow due to non-attendance of Haeseong.)	4–1
5	Haeseong	5	1	0	4	5	18	−13	3					—	2–0 (Note: Awarded a 2–0 win to Haeseong due to non-attendance of Woljin Club.)
6	Woljin Club	5	0	0	5	7	36	−29	0						—

Source: RSSSF

==== Group 9 ====
Group of Daegu, Ulsan and Gyeongbuk.

Pos	Team	Pld	W	D	L	GF	GA	GD	Pts	PHC	SIN	SEO	FBL	GPP
1	Pohang City	4	4	0	0	22	6	+16	12	—	2–1	6–1	8–2	6–2
2	Sinu Club	4	3	0	1	18	2	+16	9		—	2–0	5–0	10–0
3	Seongseo	4	2	0	2	13	10	+3	6			—	6–2	6–0
4	Football Love	4	1	0	3	13	20	−7	3				—	9–1
5	Good People	4	0	0	4	3	31	−28	0					—

Source: RSSSF

==== Ranking of second-placed teams ====
The supplementary round was contested between second-placed team in Group 9 and the seventh best team among the other eight second-placed teams.

Pos	Grp	Team	Pld	W	D	L	GF	GA	GD	Pts	Qualification
1	4	Ace	5	4	1	0	23	8	+15	13	Qualification for the preliminary round
2	8	Tongyeong City	5	4	0	1	37	7	+30	12	Qualification for the preliminary round
3	3	Scorpions	5	4	0	1	28	10	+18	12	Qualification for the preliminary round
4	1	Bukak Club	5	4	0	1	21	6	+15	12	Qualification for the preliminary round
5	7	Hanuri	5	4	0	1	12	4	+8	12	Qualification for the preliminary round
6	2	System	5	3	2	0	24	15	+9	11	Qualification for the preliminary round
7	5	J Club	5	3	1	1	18	16	+2	10	Qualification for the supplementary round
8	6	Myongji Unicorns	5	2	1	2	16	9	+7	7	

Source: RSSSF

==== Supplementary round ====
Sinu Club advanced to the preliminary round.

June 15	Sinu Club	4–3	J Club	Paju NFC

=== Preliminary round ===
==== Amateur teams path ====
Team 1	Agg.	Team 2	1st leg	2nd leg
Union	5–12	Chungju Solveige	1–7	4–5
Challenger	4–7	Ace	2–4	2–3
Soccer Mania	15–5	Hanuri	5–3	10–2
JEI Education	w/o (Note: Scorpions abandoned the preliminary round.)	Scorpions	7–4	—
Bongshin Club	7–3	Bukak Club	4–2	3–1
Guri EOS	8–6	System	5–5	3–1
Dau Club	w/o (Note: Dau Club forfeited the matches.)	Sinu Club	1–2	—
Pohang City	10–2	Tongyeong City	5–0	5–2

==== Universities path ====
August 3	World Cyber College	0–4	Kyungil University

August 3	Pai Chai University	3–0	Hanmin University

August 3	University of Suwon CEC	0–2	Yong In University

==== Seed decision match ====
Seoul City directly advanced to the round of 32, and Soongsil University qualified for the playoff round.

July 4	Seoul City	1–0	Soongsil University	Paju NFC

=== Playoff round ===
August 10	Kwangwoon University	4–2	Industrial Bank of Korea

August 10	Suwon City	6–0	Valeo Pyeonghwa

August 10	Korea University	3–0	Sinu Club

August 10	Konkuk University	3–2	Dong-Eui University

August 10	Seosan Citizen	3–0	Hyundai Motor Company

August 10	Ajou University	4–2	Hoseo University

August 10	Hongik University	2–1	Pohang City

August 10	JEI Education	1–1 (a.e.t.) (5–4 p)	Kyungil University

August 17	Cheongju Solveige	0–2	Pai Chai University

August 17	Gimpo Hallelujah	0–0 (a.e.t.) (2–3 p)	Bongshin Club

August 17	Hyundai Mipo Dockyard	8–0	Ace

August 17	Incheon Korea Railroad	2–0	Soccer Mania

August 17	Hannam University	4–1	Uijeongbu Raiders

August 17	Myongji University	1–0	Incheon National University

August 17	Soongsil University	5–1	Guri EOS

August 17	Kyongshin Cable	1–6	Yong In University

== Final rounds ==
=== Bracket ===
Round of 32
Hyundai Mipo Dockyard (p)	3 (1)
Kwangwoon University	3 (1)
Pohang Steelers	5
JEI Education	0
Gwangju Sangmu Bulsajo	9
Yong In University	1
Jeonnam Dragons	1
Incheon Korea Railroad	0
Daegu FC	5
Myongji University	2
Busan I'Cons	2 (4)
Konkuk University (p)	2 (5)
Suwon City	3
Bongshin Club	0
Ulsan Hyundai Horang-i	3
Soongsil University	2
Korean Police (p)	0 (3)
Hongik University	0 (0)
Suwon Samsung Bluewings	2
Kyung Hee University	3
Anyang LG Cheetahs	1
Korea University	2
Jeonbuk Hyundai Motors	w/o
Seoul City	—
Seongnam Ilhwa Chunma	5
Ajou University	3
Daejeon Citizen	3
Hannam University	0
Goyang KB Kookmin Bank	5
Pai Chai University	0
Bucheon SK	2
Seosan Citizen	0

Round of 16
Hyundai Mipo Dockyard	0
Pohang Steelers (a.e.t.)	1
Gwangju Sangmu Bulsajo	0
Jeonnam Dragons	2
Daegu FC	2
Konkuk University	1
Suwon City	0
Ulsan Hyundai Horang-i	2
Korean Police	5
Kyung Hee University	2
Korea University	1
Jeonbuk Hyundai Motors	3
Seongnam Ilhwa Chunma	1
Daejeon Citizen	5
Goyang KB Kookmin Bank	1
Bucheon SK (a.e.t.)	2

Quarter-finals
Pohang Steelers	0
Jeonnam Dragons	1
Daegu FC	0
Ulsan Hyundai Horang-i (a.e.t.)	1
Korean Police	0
Jeonbuk Hyundai Motors	1
Daejeon Citizen	0
Bucheon SK	2

Semi-finals
28 November – Seoul
Jeonnam Dragons	2
Ulsan Hyundai Horang-i	0
28 November – Seoul
Jeonbuk Hyundai Motors	1
Bucheon SK	0

Final
30 November – Seoul
Jeonnam Dragons	2 (0)
Jeonbuk Hyundai Motors (p)	2 (3)

=== Round of 32 ===
Seoul City withdrew from the competition.

November 21	Hyundai Mipo Dockyard	3–3 (a.e.t.) (3–1 p)	Kwangwoon University	Gumi Civil Stadium
	Kim Yeong-gi 34'; Cheon Jeong-hui 76'; Park Jong-uk 86'		Lee Seong-jae 42'; Kim Tae-su 73'; Bae Ki-jong 90'

November 21	Pohang Steelers	5–0	JEI Education	Gumi Civil Stadium
	Choi Chul-woo 2', 34'; Lee Kil-yong 13'; Park Won-jae 28'; Petreski 72'

November 21	Gwangju Sangmu Bulsajo	9–1	Yong In University	Gimcheon Stadium
	Cho Jae-jin 4'; Son Jeong-tak 10', 22'; Kim Dae-uk 56', 57', 72', 78'; Jung Suk-keun 64'; Lee Hyeon-dong 83'		An Jae-ho 84'

November 21	Jeonnam Dragons	1–0	Incheon Korea Railroad	Gimcheon Stadium
	Shin Byung-ho 69'

November 21	Daegu FC	5–2	Myongji University	Namhae Sports Park
	Lee Sang-il 6', 9', 38', 56'; Song Jung-hyun 34'		Han Tae-you 69'; Jeon Kwang-jin 72'

November 21	Busan I'Cons	2–2 (a.e.t.) (4–5 p)	Konkuk University	Namhae Sports Park
	Cooke 52'; Castillo Harry German 71'		Kim Hyung-bum 4'; Ju Hyeong-cheol 58'

November 21	Suwon City	3–0	Bongshin Club	Namhae Stadium
	Park Yeong-deok 32', 37'; Jeon Gyeong-jin 38'

November 21	Ulsan Hyundai Horang-i	3–2	Soongsil University	Namhae Stadium
	Lúcio Bala 44'; Dodô 64', 87'		Yoo Hong-youl 56'; Kim Jeong-gyeom 78'

November 22	Korean Police	0–0 (a.e.t.) (3–0 p)	Hongik University	Suwon Sports Complex

November 22	Suwon Samsung Bluewings	2–3	Kyung Hee University	Suwon Sports Complex
	Tuta 18'; Eninho 37'		Kim Won-jae 16'; Sin Dae-gyeong 27'; Jeong Yang-han 70'

November 22	Anyang LG Cheetahs	1–2	Korea University	Cheonan Oryong Stadium
	Agnaldo 88'		Lee Jin-woo 44'; Jo Min-haeng 72'

November 22	Jeonbuk Hyundai Motors	Walkover	Seoul City	Cheonan Oryong Stadium

November 22	Seongnam Ilhwa Chunma	5–3	Ajou University	Uijeongbu Stadium
	Kim Dae-eui 29'; Kim Do-hoon 47', 76'; Kim Jeong-jae 63'; Seo Gwan-su 67'		Choi Hyo-jin 21', 65'; Kim Jae-sung 80'

November 22	Daejeon Citizen	3–0	Hannam University	Uijeongbu Stadium
	Kim Jong-hyeon 65'; Lee Kwan-woo 72' (pen.), 81'

November 22	Goyang KB Kookmin Bank	5–0	Pai Chai University	Goyang Stadium
	Jang Seong-uk 20'; Lee Ho-sung 37'; Seong Jong-hyeon 60'; Kim Gi-jong 62'; Baek Seung-u 71'

November 22	Bucheon SK	2–0	Seosan Citizen	Goyang Stadium
	Park Seong-cheol 31'; Lee Won-shik 62'

=== Round of 16 ===
November 23	Hyundai Mipo Dockyard	0–1 (a.e.t.)	Pohang Steelers	Gumi Civil Stadium
			Woo Sung-yong 102'

November 23	Gwangju Sangmu Bulsajo	0–2	Jeonnam Dragons	Gumi Civil Stadium
			Itamar 8'; Shin Byung-ho 16'

November 23	Daegu FC	2–1	Konkuk University	Namhae Sports Park
	Park Seong-hong 24'; Ha Eun-cheol 74'		Kim Hyung-bum 57'

November 23	Suwon City	0–2	Ulsan Hyundai Horang-i	Namhae Sports Park
			Dodô 1'; Lúcio Bala 50'

November 24	Korean Police	5–2	Kyung Hee University	Cheonan Oryong Stadium
	Seong Ho-sang 34'; Nam Gi-seong 53'; Lee Yeong-uk 59'; Lee Sang-tae 64', 79'		Park Jin-ok 56', 66'

November 24	Korea University	1–3	Jeonbuk Hyundai Motors	Cheonan Oryong Stadium
	Gang Gi-eon 2'		Edmilson 1' (pen.), 27'; Chu Un-gi 77'

November 24	Seongnam Ilhwa Chunma	1–5	Daejeon Citizen	Goyang Stadium
	Kim Do-hoon 64' (pen.)		Lim Yeong-ju 12'; Kim Jong-hyeon 31'; Alison 45', 71'; Lee Kwan-woo 63'

November 24	Goyang KB Kookmin Bank	1–2 (a.e.t.)	Bucheon SK	Goyang Stadium
	Lee Ho-sung 53'		Lee Won-shik 75'; Dabo 92'

=== Querter-finals ===
November 25	Pohang Steelers	0–1	Jeonnam Dragons	Gumi Civil Stadium
			Julinho 82'

November 25	Daegu FC	0–1 (a.e.t.)	Ulsan Hyundai Horang-i	Namhae Sports Park
			Yoo Kyoung-youl 107'

November 26	Korean Police	0–1	Jeonbuk Hyundai Motors	Cheonan Oryong Stadium
			Seo Hyuk-su 42'

November 26	Daejeon Citizen	0–2	Bucheon SK	Goyang Stadium
			Yun Jeong-chun 76'; Kim Gi-hyeong 90'

=== Semi-finals ===
November 28	Jeonnam Dragons	2–0	Ulsan Hyundai Horang-i	Seoul World Cup Stadium
	Itamar 45'; Michel 55'

November 28	Jeonbuk Hyundai Motors	1–0	Bucheon SK	Seoul World Cup Stadium
	Seo Hyuk-su 7'

=== Final ===
November 30	Jeonnam Dragons	2–2 (a.e.t.) (0–3 p)	Jeonbuk Hyundai Motors	Seoul World Cup Stadium
	Shin Byung-ho 51', 65'		Edmilson 9', 47'

== See also ==
- 2003 in South Korean football
- 2003 K League
- 2003 K2 League
