= Kim Young-chul (footballer) =

South Korean footballer (born 1976)

Personal information
- Full name: Kim Young-chul
- Date of birth: 30 June 1976 (age 50)
- Place of birth: Incheon, South Korea
- Height: 1.83 m (6 ft 0 in)
- Position: Center-back

Team information
- Current team: Dong A Thanh Hoa FC (manager)

College career
Years	Team	Apps	(Gls)
1995–1998	Konkuk University		

Senior career*
Years	Team	Apps	(Gls)
1999–2008	Seongnam Ilhwa Chunma	206	(1)
2003–2004	→ Gwangju Sangmu (draft)	54	(0)
2009	Jeonnam Dragons	17	(0)
2010–2011	Bucheon FC 1995		
Total		277	(1)

International career
2002	South Korea U23	5 (Note: Appearances as an overage player in Asian Games)	(0)
1997–2006	South Korea	15	(1)

Managerial career
- 2018–2022: Gangseo University
- 2023–2024: FC Seoul (assistant)
- 2024–2026: Daegu Technical High School
- 2025: Vietnam U23 (assistant)
- 2026–: Thanh Hoa
Medal record
Representing South Korea
Men's football
Asian Games
Bronze medal – third place	2002 Busan	Team
- * Club domestic league appearances and goals

- Kim Young-chul
- Hangul: 김영철
- Hanja: 金泳澈
- RR: Gim Yeongcheol
- MR: Kim Yŏngch'ŏl

Kim Young-chul (born 30 June 1976) is a former South Korean footballer. Kim played as a centre-back for South Korea national team in the 2006 FIFA World Cup. He is currently the manager of V.League 1 club Thanh Hoa.

== Career statistics ==
=== Club ===
Club	Season	League			National cup		League cup		Continental		Total	
Club	Season	Division	Apps	Goals	Apps	Goals	Apps	Goals	Apps	Goals	Apps	Goals
Seongnam Ilhwa Chunma	1999	K League	26	0	?	?	7	0	—		33	0
Seongnam Ilhwa Chunma	2000	K League	26	0	?	?	12	0	?	?	38	0
Seongnam Ilhwa Chunma	2001	K League	26	0	?	?	9	0	?	?	35	0
Seongnam Ilhwa Chunma	2002	K League	25	0	?	?	11	0	?	?	36	0
Seongnam Ilhwa Chunma	2005	K League	24	0	1	0	12	0	—		37	0
Seongnam Ilhwa Chunma	2006	K League	28	0	0	0	4	0	—		32	0
Seongnam Ilhwa Chunma	2007	K League	28	1	1	0	1	0	?	?	30	1
Seongnam Ilhwa Chunma	2008	K League	23	0	2	0	9	0	—		34	0
Seongnam Ilhwa Chunma	Total		206	1	4	0	65	0	?	?	275	1
Gwangju Sangmu (draft)	2003	K League	35	0	0	0	—		—		35	0
Gwangju Sangmu (draft)	2004	K League	19	0	1	0	11	0	—		31	0
Gwangju Sangmu (draft)	Total		54	0	1	0	11	0	—		66	0
Jeonnam Dragons	2009	K League	17	0	0	0	3	0	—		20	0
Bucheon FC 1995	2010	K3 League	?	?	?	?	—		—		?	?
Bucheon FC 1995	2011	K3 League	?	?	?	?	—		—		?	?
Bucheon FC 1995	Total		?	?	?	?	—		—		?	?
Career total			277	1	5	0	79	0	?	?	361	1

=== International ===
Results list South Korea's goal tally first.

No.	Date	Venue	Opponent	Score	Result	Competition
1	12 November 2005	Seoul, South Korea	Sweden	2–1	2–2	Friendly

== Honours ==
Seongnam Ilhwa Chunma

- K League 1: 2001, 2002, 2006
- Korean FA Cup: 1999
- Korean League Cup: 2002
- Korean Super Cup: 2002

South Korea U23

- Asian Games bronze medal: 2002

Individual

- K League All-Star: 2000, 2002, 2006
- K League 1 Best XI: 2005, 2006
