= Kim Jung-hyuk (footballer) =

South Korean footballer

Kim Jung-hyuk 김정혁
Personal information
- Date of birth: November 30, 1968 (age 57)
- Position: Midfielder

Youth career
- Myongji University

Senior career*
Years	Team	Apps	(Gls)
1992–1996	Daewoo Royals	45	(1)
1996–2002	Chunnam Dragons	113	(2)

International career
1992–1998	South Korea	17	(1)

Managerial career
- 2009–: Mokpo City
- * Club domestic league appearances and goals

Kim Jung-hyuk was former South Korean football player. He is currently the manager of Mokpo City FC.

== Honours ==
=== Player ===
Chunnam Dragons

- FA Cup Winners (1) : 1997

=== Individual ===
- FA Cup MVP (1): 1997
