= Lee Jang-kwan =

South Korean footballer (born 1974)

Lee Jang-Kwan
Personal information
- Date of birth: July 4, 1974 (age 52)
- Place of birth: Seoul, South Korea
- Height: 1.70 m (5 ft 7 in)
- Position: Midfielder

Youth career
- Ajou University

Senior career*
Years	Team	Apps	(Gls)
1997–2007	Busan I'Park	239	(2)
2008	Incheon United	3	(0)

Managerial career
- 2011–2022: Yong-In University
- 2022: Jeonnam Dragons
- * Club domestic league appearances and goals

- Lee Jang-kwan
- Hangul: 이장관
- Hanja: 李將寬
- RR: I Janggwan
- MR: I Changgwan

Lee Jang-Kwan (born July 4, 1974) is a South Korean football manager and retired player.

== Career statistics ==
Club performance			League		Cup		League Cup		Continental		Total	
Season	Club	League	Apps	Goals	Apps	Goals	Apps	Goals	Apps	Goals	Apps	Goals
South Korea			League		KFA Cup		League Cup		Asia		Total	
1997	Pusan Daewoo Royals	K-League	11	1	?	?	15	1	-			
1998	Pusan Daewoo Royals	K-League	16	0	?	?	16	0	?	?		
1999	Pusan Daewoo Royals	K-League	24	0	?	?	10	0	?	?		
2000	Pusan I'cons	K-League	23	1	?	?	10	0	-			
2001	Pusan I'cons	K-League	21	0	?	?	11	0	-			
2002	Busan I'cons	K-League	17	0	?	?	8	0	-			
2003	Busan I'cons	K-League	41	0	1	0	-		-		42	0
2004	Busan I'cons	K-League	23	0	4	0	11	0	-		38	0
2005	Busan I'Park	K-League	22	0	1	0	10	0	?	?		
2006	Busan I'Park	K-League	22	0	2	0	11	1	-		35	1
2007	Busan I'Park	K-League	19	0	2	0	7	0	-		28	0
2008	Incheon United	K-League	3	0	1	0	3	0	-		7	0
Total	South Korea		242	2			112	2				
Career total			242	2			112	2				
