= Cha Kwi-hyun =

South Korean footballer

Personal information
- Date of birth: 12 January 1975 (age 51)
- Place of birth: South Korea
- Position: Forward

Youth career
- 1990–1992: Hanyang Technical High School
- 1993–1996: Hanyang University

Senior career*
Years	Team	Apps	(Gls)
1997–1998	Daejeon Citizen	13	(0)
1999	Jeonnam Dragons	13	(1)
- * Club domestic league appearances and goals as of 10 June 2007

Cha Kwi-hyun (Korean: 차귀현; born 12 January 1975) is a football player from South Korea.

He was a member of the South Korean youth (U-20) team in early 1990s and went on to play as a professional in the K-League.

== Club history ==
- Daejeon Citizen (1997–1998)
- Chunnam Dragons (1999)

== See also ==
- List of South Korean footballers
- Sport in South Korea
