= Yoo Sang-soo =

South Korean footballer (born 1973)

Yoo Sang-Soo
Personal information
- Full name: Yoo Sang-Soo
- Date of birth: 28 August 1973 (age 53)
- Place of birth: Chuncheon, South Korea
- Position: Defender

Team information
- Current team: Jincheon HR (manager)

Youth career
- –1996: Korea University

Senior career*
Years	Team	Apps	(Gls)
1996–1999	Bucheon SK	64	(0)
1999–2002	Anyang LG Cheetahs	52	(0)
2003–2006	Chunnam Dragons	107	(5)
2008	Seoul United		
2013	Ulsan Hyundai Mipo	5	(0)
Total		228	(5)

Managerial career
- –2012: Suwon Technical High School (assistant)
- 2013: Ulsan Hyundai Mipo Dolphin (assistant)
- 2013–2014: Ulsan Hyundai (assistant)
- 2014–2026: Korea University Women's (assistant)
- 2026–: Jincheon HR
- * Club domestic league appearances and goals

Yoo Sang-Soo (Korean: 유상수; born 28 August 1973) is a South Korean football manager and retired player who played as a defender. He is currently the manager of K4 League club, Jincheon HR. He participated in Summer Universiade in 1995.
