= Ajou Law School =

Coordinates: 37.282091°N 127.046324°E

Ajou Law School (아주대학교 법학전문대학원) is one of the professional graduate schools of Ajou University, located in Suwon, South Korea. Founded in 2009, it is one of the founding law schools in South Korea and is one of the smaller schools with each class in the three-year J.D. program having approximately 50 students.

== Programs ==
Ajou Law specializes on the small and medium business law and runs a small and medium business law center. The school has made series of agreements with the Suwon Chamber of Commerce and the Bar Association of Suwon. It has an exchange program with Indiana University Law School which allows the Ajou students to also obtain an LLM from the U.S. school in three years.
