= Chi Hwan Lee =

American biomedical engineer, academic, and researcher

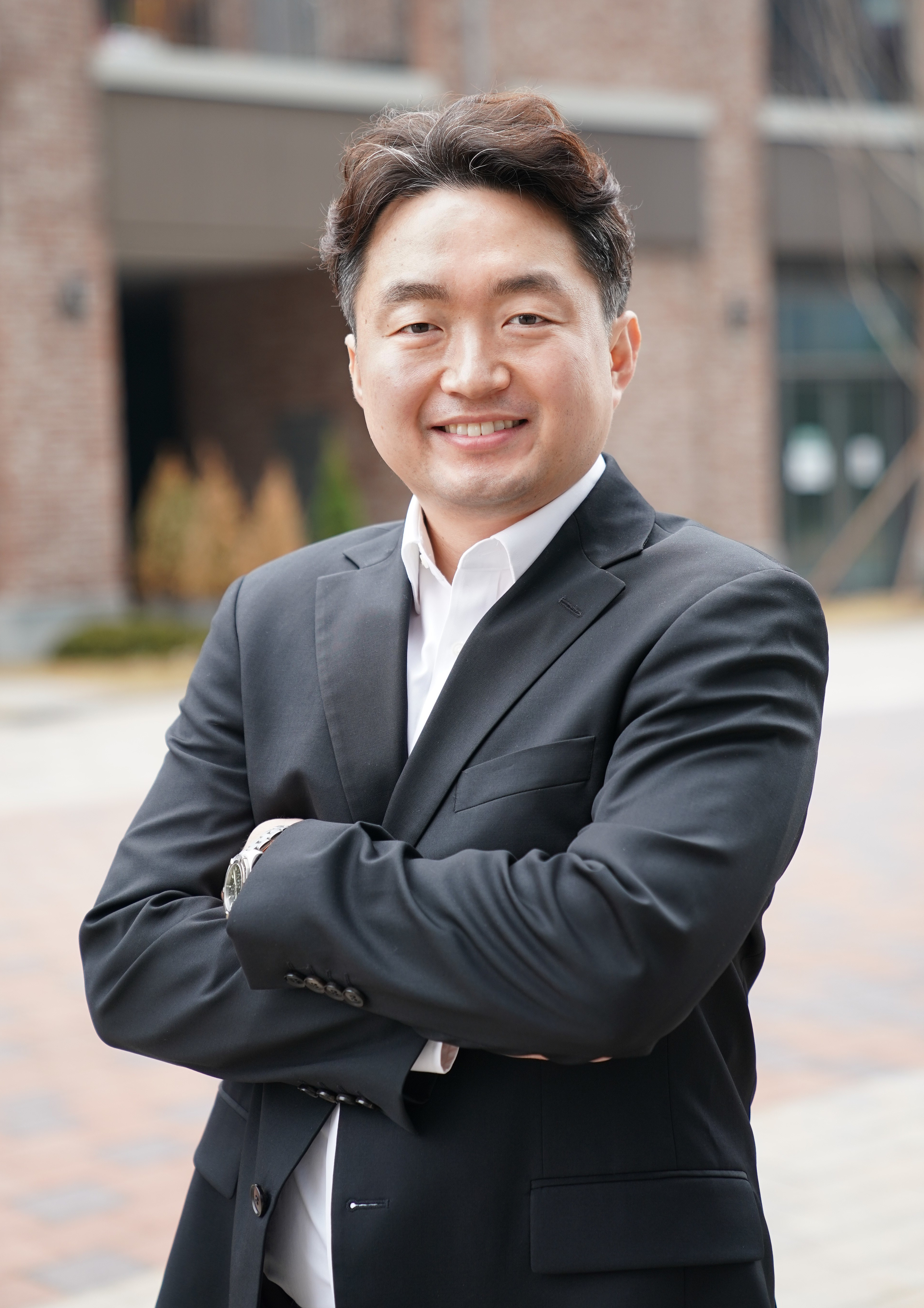
- Occupations: Biomedical engineer, academic, and researcher
- Awards: Young Investigator Award, Korean-American Scientists and Engineers Association (KSEA); Trailblazer Award, National Institutes of Health (NIH); Sensors Young Investigator Award, Sensors

Academic background
- Education: Ajou University; Illinois Institute of Technology; Stanford University

Academic work
- Institutions: Purdue University

Chi Hwan Lee is an American biomedical engineer, academic, and researcher. He is a Fellow of the American Institute for Medical and Biological Engineering (AIMBE), a Purdue University Faculty Scholar, and holds the Leslie A. Geddes Professor of Biomedical Engineering and Mechanical Engineering, and by courtesy, of Materials Engineering, Electrical and Computer Engineering, and Speech, Language, and Hearing Sciences at Purdue University.

Lee has published over 100 journal papers and 7 book chapters, issued 13 patents, and launched 4 startup companies. He has focused his research on wearable healthcare technologies, tele-medicine, functional soft biomaterials, stretchable bioelectronics, drug delivery systems, and smart manufacturing processes.

== Early life and education ==
Lee graduated with a B.E. degree in industrial engineering from Ajou University in 2006. He then emigrated to United States, earning his dual B.S. degree in mechanical engineering at Illinois Institute of Technology in 2007. He obtained his M.S. and Ph.D. degrees in mechanical engineering from Stanford University in 2009 and 2013, respectively. From 2013 till 2015, he was a postdoctoral research associate in Department of Materials Science and Engineering at University of Illinois at Urbana-Champaign.)

== Career ==
Following his postdoctoral training, Lee joined Purdue University as an assistant professor in 2015, and became Leslie A. Geddes Assistant Professor in 2020, Leslie A. Geddes Associate Professor in 2021, and Leslie A. Geddes Professor in 2024. Since 2021, he has been serving as Industry Advisory Board (IAB) Professor at Hanyang University.

Lee has been appointed as a scientific advisor for Omniply Technologies since 2018 and chief technical officer (CTO) of Rescue Biomedical since 2019 and served as CTO of Curasis from 2018 to 2021. He developed and led an international dual MS degree program in the Weldon School of Biomedical Engineering and the School of Mechanical Engineering at Purdue University with Hanyang University.

== Research ==
Lee's research is focused on the development of wearable biomedical devices, with particular attention on the scalable production of stretchable sensors in quantities required for clinical testing, and ultimately widespread applications.

=== Clinical and healthcare practices ===
Lee has made significant contribution towards the development of a skin sensor patch tailored for various human body parts in order to detect clinically important biosignals in real time.

Lee is also a pioneer in the development of a soft patch featured with miniaturized functional needles for applications involving intracellular delivery of biomolecules as well as intracellular recording of electrophysiological signals at the cellular scale. He designed these devices to enable placement of the needles at characteristic dimensions equivalent to those of human cells, as well as provide the basis for interactions with the surrounding tissue defined by these cells.

=== Wearable biomedical technology ===
Lee along with his team also works to develop wearable technology for animals by enabling direct printing of functional nanomaterials into textile weave of commercial blankets for animals over large scale. Lee has teamed up with Laurent Couetil in Purdue Veterinary Medicine to develop a smart connected blanket for horse with asthma in order to monitor respiration rate continuously, or even overnight, from a distance.

These devices were made possible by the discovery and development of transfer printing of thin film electronics by Lee and his colleagues. Lee's method prints a nearly infinite number of thin film electronics on a single wafer, which are then delaminated from the wafer using simply water. The thin film electronics are then placed and bonded on elastic surfaces to form flexible devices.

=== Drug delivery systems ===
In 2022, Lee introduced a new concept of drug delivery system using a combination of silicon nanoneedles and a tear-soluble contact lens, enabling the painless and long-term sustained release of ocular drugs into eyes. Lee teamed up with Yanni Paulus in the University of Michigan Medicine to demonstrate the utility of the drug delivery system in effectively treating a chronic ocular disease, such as corneal neovascularization, in a rabbit model without showing a noticeable side effect over current standard therapies. In his early works, Lee introduced a wirelessly operated, implantable drug delivery system using a combination of thermally actuated lipid membranes embedded with multiple types of drugs. He also discussed underlying operational and materials aspects, as well as the basic efficacy and biocompatibility of the system. In another study, he presented a system in which the constituent materials undergo complete bioresorption to eliminate device load from the patient after completing the final stage of the release process. He demonstrated the applications of this technology in terms of the treatment of cancerous tissues by release of the drug doxorubicin. Moreover, he presented a review on the emerging trends and latest innovations of wearable glucose monitoring and implantable insulin delivery technologies for diabetes management with a focus on their advanced materials and construction.

== Awards and honors ==
- 2013 – Graduate Student Silver Award, Materials Research Society (MRS)
- 2013 – Top Innovation Award, Technology Connect World National Innovation Summit
- 2014 – Best Talk Award, Postdoctoral Research Symposium, Beckman Institute
- 2018 – Ralph W. and Grace M. Showalter Research Trust Award
- 2018 – Hanwha Advanced Materials Non-Tenure Faculty Award, Hanhwa Corp., South Korea
- 2019 – Trailblazer Award for New and Early Stage Investigators – National Institutes of Health (NIH)
- 2019 – Korean-American Scientists and Engineers Association (KSEA) Young Investigator Award
- 2019 – Ajouin Outstanding Professional Award, Ajou University, South Korea
- 2020 – Faculty Award of Excellence for Early Career Research, Purdue University
- 2020 – Named One of the Most Impactful Faculty Inventors in FY2019-20, Purdue University and OTC
- 2020 – Ajou Leaders Honor Club Award, Ajou University, South Korea
- 2021 – Sensors Young Investigator Award, Sensors
- 2021 – Editor's Award, Journal of Speech, Language, and Hearing Research, ASHA Journal Academy

== Bibliography ==
- M. Kim*, C. Kantarcigil*, B. Kim, R. K. Baruah, S. Maity, Y. Park, K. Kim, S. Lee, J. B. Malandraki, A. Avlani, A. Smith, S. Sen, M. A. Alam, G. Malandraki*, C. H. Lee*, Flexible submental sensor patch with remote monitoring controls for management of oropharyngeal swallowing disorders, Science Advances, 5, 12, eaay3210 (2019).
- B. Kim*, M Kim*, Y. Cho, E. Hamed, M. Gillette, H. Cha, N. Miljkovic, V. Aakalu, K. Kang, K. Son, K. Schachtschneider, L. Schook, C. Hu, G. Popescu, W. Balance, S. Yu, S. Im, J. Lee, C. H. Lee*, H. Kong*, Electrothermal soft manipulator enabling rapid transport and assembly of thin biological sheets and electronic devices, Science Advances, 6, 42, eabc5630 (2020).
- K. Kim*, H. Kim*, H. Zhang*, W. Park, D. Meyer, M. Kim, B. Kim, H. Park, B. Xu*, P. Kollbaum*, B. Boudouris*, C. H. Lee*, All-printed corneal electrodes on soft contact lenses for noninvasive recording of human electroretinogram, Nature Communications, 12, 1544 (2021)
- B. Kim*, A. Soepriatna*, W. Park, H. Moon, A. Cox, J. Zhao, N. Gupta, C. Park, K. Kim, Y. Jeon, H. Jang, D. Kim, H. Lee, K. Lee*, C. Goergen*, C. H. Lee*, Rapid custom printing of poroelastic biosensor for simultaneous epicardial recording and imaging, Nature Communications, 12, 3710 (2021)
- T. Chang*, S. Akins*, M. Kim, L. Murray, Y. Park, S. Cho, S. Hur, L. Couetil*, M. Jun*, C. H. Lee*, Programmable dual regime spray for large-scale and custom-designed electronic textiles, Advanced Materials, 34, 9, 2108021 (2022) – Journal Cover Feature
