= Seyit Cem Ünsal =

Turkish footballer (born 1975)

Personal information
- Full name: Seyit Cem Ünsal
- Date of birth: 9 October 1975 (age 51)
- Place of birth: Kayseri, Turkey
- Height: 1.85 m (6 ft 1 in)
- Position: Forward

Youth career
- Kayserispor

Senior career*
Years	Team	Apps	(Gls)
1994–1995	Kayserispor	11	(1)
1995–1997	Gençlerbirliği S.K.	11	(1)
1996–1997	→ Erzurumspor (loan)	28	(6)
1997–1998	Anyang LG Cheetahs	3	(0)
1998	Barcelona	0	(0)
1998–2003	Trabzonspor	10	(0)
1999–2000	→ Vanspor (loan)	11	(4)
2000–2001	→ Kocaelispor (loan)	4	(0)
2001–2002	→ Batman Petrolspor (loan)	13	(3)
2003	İstanbul BB	1	(0)
2004–2005	Altay S.K.	7	(0)
2005–2006	Şanlıurfaspor	5	(0)

International career
1993	Turkey U18	6	(0)
- * Club domestic league appearances and goals

Seyit Cem Ünsal (born 9 October 1975) is a Turkish professional footballer who plays as a forward. He was the first Turkish player in South Korea and Barcelona in Spain.

== Club career ==
Ünsal began his professional career with local club Kayserispor in 1994. He played mainly for Turkish clubs, as well as for South Korean side Anyang LG Cheetahs between 1997 and 1998, making a total of 12 appearances and scoring 1 goal (1997 FA Cup) in all competitions.

== Enternal links ==
- TFF profile
- Seyit Cem Ünsal – K League stats at kleague.com (in Korean and English)
- Photograph at Anyang LG Cheetahs
