= Lee Ho-sung (footballer) =

South Korean footballer (born 1974)

Personal information
- Date of birth: September 12, 1974 (age 52)
- Place of birth: South Korea
- Position: Forward

Youth career
- Chungang University

Senior career*
Years	Team	Apps	(Gls)
1997–2001	Daejeon Citizen	43	(8)
2002–2003	Goyang Kookmin Bank		
2004	Balestier Khalsa		(6)

International career
1993	South Korea U-20		
1995	South Korea U-23	2	(0)
- * Club domestic league appearances and goals

Lee Ho-sung (Korean: 이호성, born September 12, 1974) is a football player from South Korea.

He was a member of the South Korea U-20 team and South Korea U-23 team in early 1990s and went on to play as a professional in the K-League before moving to Singapore, to the S. League, where he played for Balestier Khalsa FC.

== Club career ==
- 1997–2001 Daejeon Citizen
- 2002–2003 Goyang Kookmin Bank
- 2004 Balestier Khalsa
