= Kim Dae-sung (footballer) =

South Korean footballer (born 1972)

Personal information
- Date of birth: May 10, 1972 (age 54)
- Place of birth: South Korea
- Height: 1.70 m (5 ft 7 in)
- Position: Midfielder

Youth career
- 1991–1994: Daegu University

Senior career*
Years	Team	Apps	(Gls)
1995–1999	Anyang LG Cheetahs	97	(7)

International career
2000–?	Dong-eui University (coach)		
- 2005–2012: Ansan Bookok Middle School (coach)
- 2012–: Ansan Bookok Middle School
- * Club domestic league appearances and goals

- Kim Dae-sung
- Hangul: 김대성
- Hanja: 金大成
- RR: Gim Daeseong
- MR: Kim Taesŏng

Kim Dae-sung (Korean: 김대성; born May 10, 1972 South Korea) is a South Korean former footballer who played as a midfielder.

He started professional career at FC Seoul, then known as LG Cheetahs in 1995.

He has been manager of Ansan Bookok Middle School FC since July 2012.
