= Korea Cup (domestic) =

Association football tournament in South Korea

- Organiser(s): Korea Football Association
- Founded: 1996; 30 years ago
- Region: South Korea
- Qualifier for: AFC Champions League Elite; AFC Champions League Two; K League Super Cup
- Current champions: Jeonbuk Hyundai Motors (2025)
- Most championships: Jeonbuk Hyundai Motors; Pohang Steelers (6 titles each)
- Website: www.kfa.or.kr/competition/korea_cup.php
- 2026–27 Korea Cup

The Korea Cup (Korean: 코리아컵), formerly the Korean FA Cup, is a national football cup knockout competition of South Korea, held annually by the Korea Football Association (KFA). Before the competition was established in 1996, three similar tournaments named All Joseon Football Championship (1935–1940), Korean National Football Championship (1946–2000) and Korean President's Cup (1952–2009) were played. It was renamed Korea Cup in 2024, with the winners qualifying for the AFC Champions League Elite (if they finish top four in the K League 1) or the AFC Champions League Two (if they finish outside the top four in the K League 1).

== History ==
The All Joseon Football Championship was founded by the Joseon Football Association (currently KFA) in 1935, during Japanese rule in Korea. It was abolished in 1940 by the Japanese government which entered World War II.

After the liberation of Korea, the KFA founded the National Football Championship and the President's Cup, entered by many semi-professional clubs and amateur clubs from all over South Korea. They opened in spring and late autumn each. The two competitions declined after the founding of the K League, because professional clubs did not take part in it. There were several attempts to get professional clubs to join the tournament, and it became so successful that in the 1988 and 1989 seasons many top clubs joined the National Championship, temporarily renamed the "FA Cup". However, it soon reverted to semi-professional status in 1990 due to a conflict between the KFA and professional clubs at the time. The professional clubs did not enter the championship after claiming the KFA had neglected to invigorate the K League.

The KFA made the Korean FA Cup separately for every club in 1996. It was renamed the Korea Cup in 2024 to be distinguished from English FA Cup.

== Format ==
=== 1996–2005 ===
The Korean FA Cup took place after the end of the regular K League season, and was usually completed over a short period. Games were played in a single-elimination format, with extra time and penalties if required. K League sides were seeded in the first round of the tournament proper, but all matches were played at neutral venues, such as Gimcheon and Namhae.

=== 2006–present ===
To elevate the status of the tournament, matches were spread throughout the year. The 2006 edition, for example, started in early March, with rounds also held in April, July, August and November. The final was played in December. As in previous years, the competition was contested in a straight knockout format.

== Sponsorship ==
Sponsor	Season	Competition
None	1996–1997	FA Cup
TG Sambo	1998	Sambo Change Up FA Cup
TG Sambo	1999	Sambo Computer FA Cup
Seoul Bank	2000–2001	Seoul Bank FA Cup
Seoul Bank	2002	Hana-Seoul Bank FA Cup
Hana Bank	2002	Hana-Seoul Bank FA Cup
Hana Bank	2003–2015	Hana Bank FA Cup
Hana Bank	2015–2019	KEB Hana Bank FA Cup
Hana Bank	2020–2021	Hana Bank FA Cup
Hana Bank	2022–2023	Hana 1Q FA Cup
Hana Bank	2024–present	Hana Bank Korea Cup

== Results ==
=== Finals ===
Season	Champions	Score	Runners-up
1996	Pohang Atoms	0–0 (a.e.t.) (7–6 p)	Suwon Samsung Bluewings
1997	Jeonnam Dragons	1–0	Cheonan Ilhwa Chunma
1998	Anyang LG Cheetahs	2–1	Ulsan Hyundai Horang-i
1999	Cheonan Ilhwa Chunma	3–0	Jeonbuk Hyundai Dinos
2000	Jeonbuk Hyundai Motors	2–0	Seongnam Ilhwa Chunma
2001	Daejeon Citizen	1–0	Pohang Steelers
2002	Suwon Samsung Bluewings	1–0	Pohang Steelers
2003	Jeonbuk Hyundai Motors	2–2 (a.e.t.) (4–2 p)	Jeonnam Dragons
2004	Busan I'Cons	1–1 (a.e.t.) (4–3 p)	Bucheon SK
2005	Jeonbuk Hyundai Motors	1–0	Hyundai Mipo Dockyard
2006	Jeonnam Dragons	2–0	Suwon Samsung Bluewings
2007	Jeonnam Dragons	3–2	Pohang Steelers
2007	Jeonnam Dragons	3–1	Pohang Steelers
2008	Pohang Steelers	2–0	Gyeongnam FC
2009	Suwon Samsung Bluewings	1–1 (a.e.t.) (4–2 p)	Seongnam Ilhwa Chunma
2010	Suwon Samsung Bluewings	1–0	Busan IPark
2011	Seongnam Ilhwa Chunma	1–0	Suwon Samsung Bluewings
2012	Pohang Steelers	1–0 (a.e.t.)	Gyeongnam FC
2013	Pohang Steelers	1–1 (a.e.t.) (4–3 p)	Jeonbuk Hyundai Motors
2014	Seongnam FC	0–0 (a.e.t.) (4–2 p)	FC Seoul
2015	FC Seoul	3–1	Incheon United
2016	Suwon Samsung Bluewings	2–1	FC Seoul
2016	Suwon Samsung Bluewings	1–2 (a.e.t.) (10–9 p)	FC Seoul
2017	Ulsan Hyundai	2–1	Busan IPark
2017	Ulsan Hyundai	0–0	Busan IPark
2018	Daegu FC	2–1	Ulsan Hyundai
2018	Daegu FC	3–0	Ulsan Hyundai
2019	Suwon Samsung Bluewings	0–0	Daejeon Korail
2019	Suwon Samsung Bluewings	4–0	Daejeon Korail
2020	Jeonbuk Hyundai Motors	1–1	Ulsan Hyundai
2020	Jeonbuk Hyundai Motors	2–1	Ulsan Hyundai
2021	Jeonnam Dragons	0–1	Daegu FC
2021	Jeonnam Dragons	4–3 (a)	Daegu FC
2022	Jeonbuk Hyundai Motors	2–2	FC Seoul
2022	Jeonbuk Hyundai Motors	3–1	FC Seoul
2023	Pohang Steelers	4–2	Jeonbuk Hyundai Motors
2024	Pohang Steelers	3–1 (a.e.t.)	Ulsan HD
2025	Jeonbuk Hyundai Motors	2–1 (a.e.t.)	Gwangju FC

=== Titles by club ===
In accordance with the official K League policy, the current clubs inherit the history and records of the predecessor clubs.

Club	Champions	Runners-up	Seasons won
Pohang Steelers	6	3	1996, 2008, 2012, 2013, 2023, 2024
Jeonbuk Hyundai Motors	6	3	2000, 2003, 2005, 2020, 2022, 2025
Suwon Samsung Bluewings	5	3	2002, 2009, 2010, 2016, 2019
Jeonnam Dragons	4	1	1997, 2006, 2007, 2021
Seongnam FC	3	3	1999, 2011, 2014
FC Seoul	2	3	1998, 2015
Ulsan HD	1	4	2017
Busan IPark	1	2	2004
Daegu FC	1	1	2018
Daejeon Citizen	1	0	2001

== Awards ==
=== Most Valuable Player ===
Season	Player	Club
1996	(South Korea) Cho Jin-ho	Pohang Steelers
1997	(South Korea) Kim Jung-hyuk	Jeonnam Dragons
1998	(South Korea) Kang Chun-ho	Anyang LG Cheetahs
1999	(South Korea) Park Nam-yeol	Cheonan Ilhwa Chunma
2000	(South Korea) Park Sung-bae	Jeonbuk Hyundai Motors
2001	(South Korea) Kim Eun-jung	Daejeon Citizen
2002	(South Korea) Seo Jung-won	Suwon Samsung Bluewings
2003	(Portugal) Edmilson	Jeonbuk Hyundai Motors
2004	(South Korea) Kim Yong-dae	Busan I'Cons
2005	(Colombia) Milton Rodríguez	Jeonbuk Hyundai Motors
2006	(South Korea) Kim Hyo-il	Jeonnam Dragons
2007	(South Korea) Kim Chi-woo	Jeonnam Dragons
2008	(South Korea) Choi Hyo-jin	Pohang Steelers
2009	(South Korea) Lee Woon-jae	Suwon Samsung Bluewings
2010	(South Korea) Yeom Ki-hun	Suwon Samsung Bluewings
2011	(South Korea) Cho Dong-geon	Seongnam Ilhwa Chunma
2012	(South Korea) Hwang Ji-soo	Pohang Steelers
2013	(South Korea) Shin Hwa-yong	Pohang Steelers
2014	(South Korea) Park Jun-hyuk	Seongnam FC
2015	(Japan) Yojiro Takahagi	FC Seoul
2016	(South Korea) Yeom Ki-hun	Suwon Samsung Bluewings
2017	(South Korea) Kim Yong-dae	Ulsan Hyundai
2018	(Brazil) Cesinha	Daegu FC
2019	(South Korea) Ko Seung-beom	Suwon Samsung Bluewings
2020	(South Korea) Lee Seung-gi	Jeonbuk Hyundai Motors
2021	(South Korea) Jeong Jae-hee	Jeonnam Dragons
2022	(South Korea) Cho Gue-sung	Jeonbuk Hyundai Motors
2023	(South Korea) Kim Jong-woo	Pohang Steelers
2024	(South Korea) Kim In-sung	Pohang Steelers
2025	(South Korea) Park Jin-seob	Jeonbuk Hyundai Motors

=== Top goalscorer ===
- Only goals since the round of 16 count in the rankings (the round of 32 until 2019, and the third round between 2020 and 2024).
- If multiple players become top goalscorers, the player who has played the fewest matches receive the award. If still tied, the player with fewer minutes played receive the award. Until 2015, a maximum of two players could become co-winners of the award, and it was not presented when three or more players became top goalscorers.
- Until 2019, the award was not presented when no one scored more than three goals (two goals until 2007).

Season	Player	Club	Goals
1996	(Russia) Denis Laktionov	Suwon Samsung Bluewings	4
1997	(South Korea) Roh Sang-rae	Jeonnam Dragons	6
1998	(South Korea) Kim Jong-kun	Ulsan Hyundai	5
1999	(South Korea) Choi Yong-soo	Anyang LG Cheetahs	5
2000	(Brazil) Cezinha	Jeonnam Dragons	4
2001	(South Korea) Kim Eun-jung	Daejeon Citizen	4
2001	(South Korea) Choi Sung-kuk	Korea University	4
2002	Not awarded		
2003	Not awarded		
2004	(South Korea) Wang Jung-hyun	FC Seoul	5
2004	(South Korea) Jung Jo-gook	FC Seoul	5
2005	(Colombia) Milton Rodríguez	Jeonbuk Hyundai Motors	6
2006	(South Korea) Jang Nam-seok	Daegu FC	3
2007	Not awarded		
2008	(South Korea) Kim Dong-chan	Gyeongnam FC	6
2009	(North Macedonia) Stevica Ristić	Pohang Steelers	5
2010	(South Korea) Ji Dong-won	Jeonnam Dragons	5
2010	(Brazil) Índio	Jeonnam Dragons	5
2011	(South Korea) Go Seul-ki	Ulsan Hyundai	4
2012	Not awarded		
2013	Not awarded		
2014	(Brazil) Kaio	Jeonbuk Hyundai Motors	4
2015	Not awarded		
2016	(Brazil) Adriano Michael Jackson	FC Seoul	5
2017	Not awarded		
2018	(Brazil) Cesinha	Daegu FC	5
2019	(South Korea) Yeom Ki-hun	Suwon Samsung Bluewings	5
2020	(Brazil) Gustavo	Jeonbuk Hyundai Motors	4
2021	(South Korea) Park Hee-seong	Jeonnam Dragons	4
2022	(South Korea) Heo Yong-joon	Pohang Steelers	4
2023	(Brazil) Gustavo	Jeonbuk Hyundai Motors	5
2024	(South Korea) Jeong Jae-hee	Pohang Steelers	4
2025	(South Korea) Goo Bon-cheul	Gangwon FC	2
