= Kim Jung-su =

South Korean bobsledder (born 1981)

- Hangul: 김정수
- RR: Gim Jeongsu
- MR: Kim Chŏngsu

Kim Jung-su (born July 7, 1981) is a South Korean bobsledder who has competed since 2006. At the 2010 Winter Olympics in Vancouver, he finished 19th in the four-man event.

Kim finished 30th in the two-man event at the FIBT World Championships 2009 in Lake Placid, New York. His best World Cup finish was 26th in the two-man event at Whistler, British Columbia in 2009.

== Education ==
- Jeonju University
- Jeonbuk Sports High School
