= Lee Jun (footballer) =

South Korean footballer (born 1997)

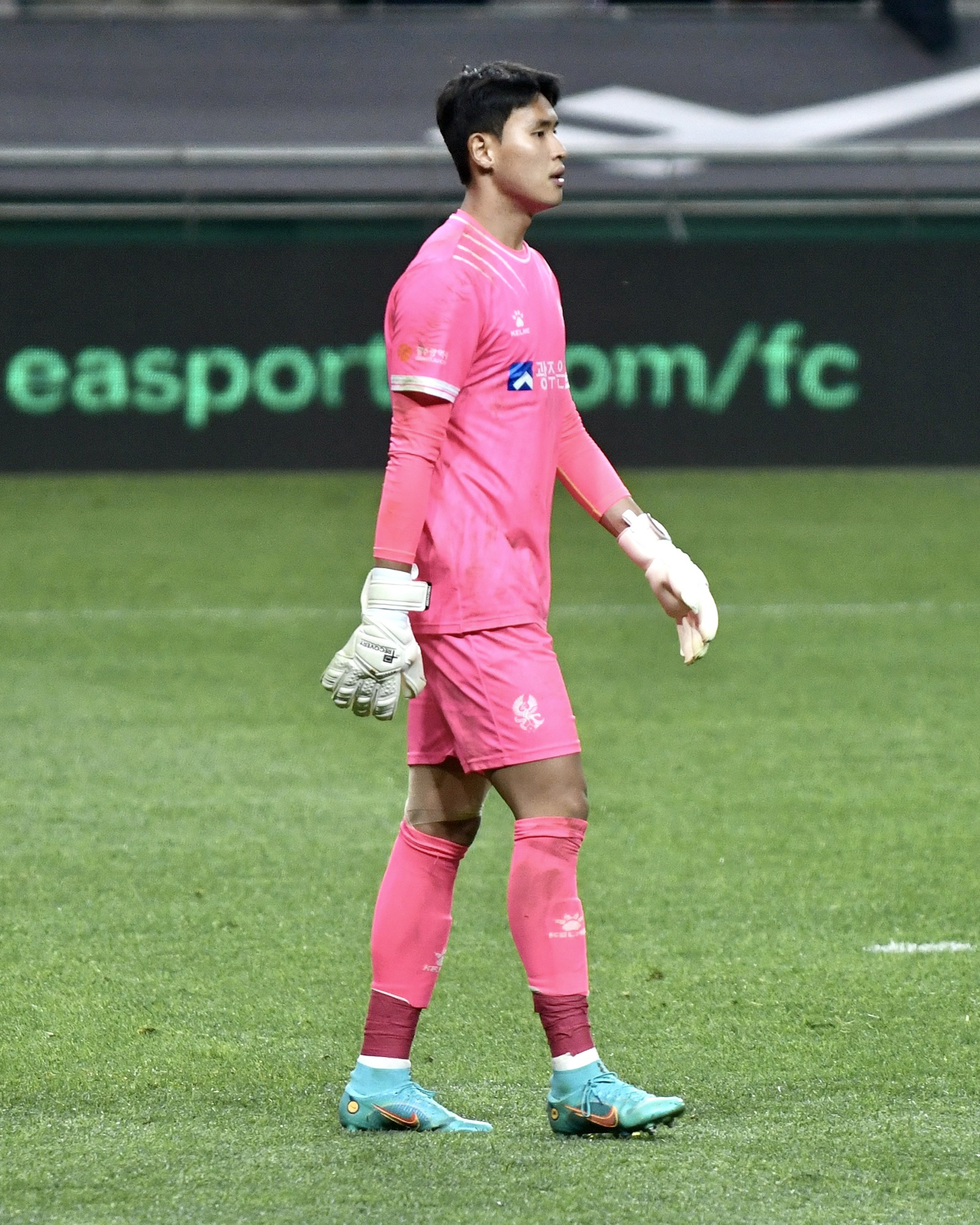
- Lee in 2023

Personal information
- Date of birth: 14 July 1997 (age 29)
- Height: 1.89 m (6 ft 2 in)
- Position: Goalkeeper

Team information
- Current team: Jeonnam Dragons
- Number: 21

Youth career
- 2009: Jangsan Elementary School
- 2010–2012: Changnyeong Middle School
- 2013–2015: Changnyeong High School
- 2016–2018: Yonsei University

Senior career*
Years	Team	Apps	(Gls)
2019–2021	Pohang Steelers	6	(0)
2022–2024	Gwangju FC	20	(0)
2025–	Jeonnam Dragons	2	(0)
- * Club domestic league appearances and goals as of 6 January 2026

- Lee Jun
- Hangul: 이준
- RR: I Jun
- MR: I Chun

Lee Jun (Korean: 이준; born 14 July 1997) is a South Korean footballer currently playing as a goalkeeper for Jeonnam Dragons.

== Career statistics ==
=== Club ===
As of 6 February 2022.

Club	Season	League			Cup		Continental		Other		Total	
Club	Season	Division	Apps	Goals	Apps	Goals	Apps	Goals	Apps	Goals	Apps	Goals
Pohang Steelers	2019	K League 1	0	0	0	0	0	0	0	0	0	0
Pohang Steelers	2020	K League 1	0	0	0	0	0	0	0	0	0	0
Pohang Steelers	2021	K League 1	6	0	0	0	3 (Note: Appearances in the AFC Champions League)	0	0	0	9	0
Gwangju FC	2022	K League 2	0	0	0	0	0	0	0	0	0	0
Career total			6	0	0	0	3	0	0	0	9	0
