= Lee Jong-joo =

South Korean bureaucrat

- 이종주

Spokesperson of Ministry of Unification
- In office 7 February 2021 – 12 May 2022
- Minister: Lee In-young
- Preceded by: Yoh Sangkey
- Succeeded by: Cho Joong-hoon

Personal details
- Born: 1972 (age 53–54)
- Education: Korea University; Harvard Kennedy School; Seoul National University; University of North Korean Studies

Lee Jong-joo (Korean: 이종주; born 1972) is a South Korean bureaucrat served as the spokesperson of the Ministry of Unification from 2021 to 2022. Lee is the first woman to hold the position since the ministry's establishment in 1969.

Lee previously served as the deputy spokesperson of the Ministry from 2009 to 2011 and the first woman to become a deputy spokesperson of any South Korean government agencies.

After passing the state exam in 1996, Lee has dedicated her career in public service - primarily at the Ministry since 1998. In 2011 she moved to South Korean embassy in the U.S. where she served as its first woman unification attache. Upon beginning of Moon Jae-in's presidency in 2017, she was transferred to administrator at Office of National Security.

Lee holds four degrees: a bachelor in sociology from Korea University, two master's in public policy from Harvard Kennedy School and Seoul National University and a doctorate in security studies from University of North Korean Studies.
