= Jinju Stadium =

Stadium in South Korea

Coordinates: 35°10′58.3″N 128°08′09.0″E

- Interactive map of Jinju Stadium
- Location: Jinju, South Korea
- Capacity: 20,116
- Surface: TBD

Construction
- Opened: 2010

Tenants
- 91st Korean National Sports Festival; Jinju Citizen FC

Jinju Stadium (Korean: 진주종합경기장), is a multi-use stadium in Jinju, South Korea It is used mostly for football matches. The stadium was built in 2010 and designed for a capacity of 20,116 spectators. This stadium is different from the old stadium Jinju Civic Stadium.

== See also ==
- Jinju Civic Stadium
