= Iksan Public Stadium =

Sports venue in Iksan, South Korea

- Full name: Iksan Public Stadium
- Location: Iksan, South Korea
- Capacity: 25,000

Construction
- Opened: 1991

Tenant
- Hallelujah FC

Iksan Public Stadium is a multi-use stadium in Iksan, South Korea built in 1991. It was used as the stadium of Hallelujah FC matches until the Gimpo City Stadium opened in 2004. The capacity of the stadium is 25,000 spectators, all seated.
