= Jinju Public Stadium =

Stadium in Jinju, South Korea

Coordinates: 35.18856°N 128.06737°E

- Interactive map of Jinju Public Stadium
- Location: Jinju, South Korea
- Capacity: 20,000

Construction
- Opened: 1968

Jinju Public Stadium (Korean: 진주공설운동장), is a multi-use stadium in Jinju, South Korea It is used mostly for football matches. The stadium was built in 1968 and designed for a capacity of 20,000 spectators. This stadium is different from the new stadium Jinju Stadium.

== See also ==
- Jinju Stadium
