= Roh Sang-rae =

South Korean footballer (born 1970)

Roh Sang-rae 노상래
Personal information
- Full name: Roh Sang-rae
- Date of birth: 15 December 1970 (age 55)
- Place of birth: Gunsan, Jeonbuk, South Korea
- Height: 1.75 m (5 ft 9 in)
- Position: Forward

Team information
- Current team: Jeonnam Dragons

Youth career
- 1990–1992: Soongsil University

Senior career*
Years	Team	Apps	(Gls)
1993–1994	H & C Bank FC (Semi-professional)		
1995–2002	Chunnam Dragons	153	(48)
2003–2004	Daegu FC	25	(5)
Total		178	(53)

International career
1995–1997	South Korea	25	(6)

Managerial career
- 2005–2006: FC KHT (Assistant)
- 2007: Ajou University (Assistant)
- 2008–2011: Jeonnam Dragons (Assistant)
- 2011–2012: Gangwon FC (Assistant)
- 2012–2014: Jeonnam Dragons (Assistant)
- 2015–2016: Jeonnam Dragons
- 2016: Jeonnam Dragons (Assistant)
- 2017: Jeonnam Dragons
- * Club domestic league appearances and goals

- Roh Sang-rae
- Hangul: 노상래
- Hanja: 盧相來
- RR: No Sangrae
- MR: No Sangnae

Roh Sang-rae (Korean: 노상래 [no saŋ.nɛ]; born 15 December 1970) is a South Korean retired footballer who played the majority of his professional career with the Jeonnam Dragons as a forward. He is currently manager of Jeonnam Dragons.

== Club career ==
In his first season, 1995, Roh exploded onto the professional football scene with the Chunnam Dragons. He achieved a triple crown, in that he was awarded the K League Rookie of the Year Award, was the highest domestic goalscorer, and featured in an All-star match MVP. He was also the top scorer in the Korean FA Cup 1997. In 1999, he was the Asian Cup Winners Cup MVP.

After eight season with the Dragons, for 2003, he transferred to new club Daegu FC for their inaugural season in the K-League. Roh would play two seasons for Daegu (27 games in total), before retiring after a limited number of appearances in the 2004 season.

He is the fifth member of 40-40 Club as of 27 April 2003. His record was 72 goals and 40 assists when he achieved this record in a game against Busan I'Park. His career record is 246 appearances, for 76 goals and 40 assists.

== International career ==
Roh has featured for the national squad on a number of occasions between 1995 and 1997, earning a total of 25 caps. Although he participated in a number of the qualifying games for the 1998 World Cup, he did not make the eventual World Cup squad.

== International goals ==
Results list South Korea's goal tally first.

Date	Venue	Opponent	Score	Result	Competition
June 10, 1995	Seoul, South Korea	Zambia	1 goal	2-3	1995 Korea Cup
March 23, 1996	Dubai, UAE	Morocco	1 goal	2-2	1996 Dubai Tournament
March 25, 1996	Dubai, UAE	Egypt	1 goal	2-2	1996 Dubai Tournament
August 11, 1996	Ho Chi Minh City, Vietnam	Vietnam	1 goal	4-0	1996 AFC Asian Cup qualification
November 26, 1996	Guangzhou, China	China	1 goal	3-2	Korea-China Annual Match
March 2, 1997	Bangkok, Thailand	Thailand	1 goal	3-1	1998 FIFA World Cup qualification

Sporting positions
Preceded by Kim Hak-Chul	Daegu FC captain 2004	Succeeded by Jin Soon-Jin
