= Jeju Stadium =

Stadium in Jeju City, South Korea

Coordinates: 33°29′49.88″N 126°30′49.17″E

Jeju Stadium 제주종합경기장 주경기장
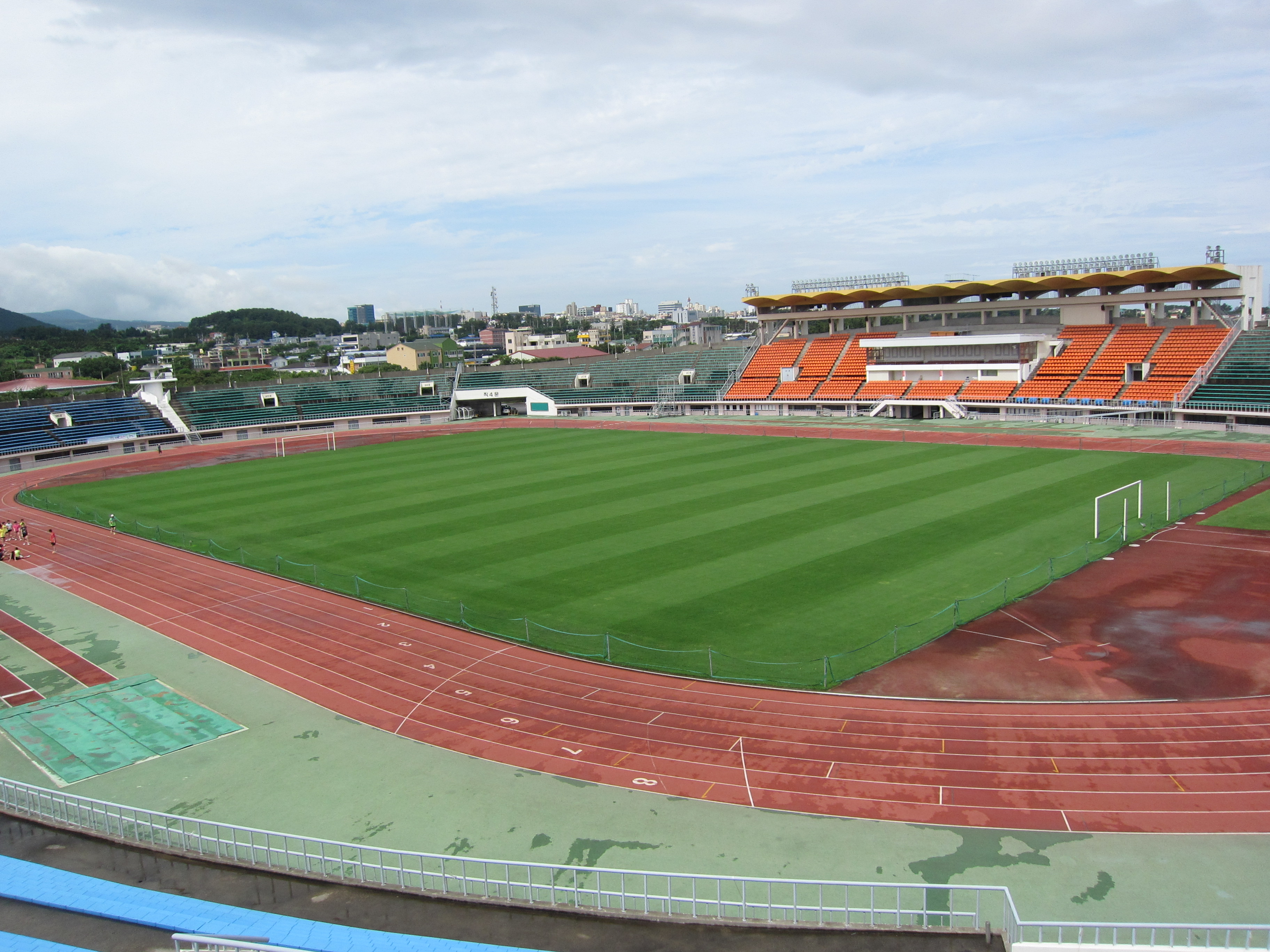
- Interactive map of Jeju Stadium 제주종합경기장 주경기장
- Location: 1163-4 Ora 1-dong, Jeju City, Jeju, South Korea
- Owner: Jeju Special Self-Governing Provincial Office
- Operator: Jeju City Hall Culture, Tourism and Sports Bureau
- Capacity: 16,387
- Surface: Natural grass
- Field size: 109 by 75 metres (119 by 82 yards)

Construction
- Groundbreaking: 1967
- Opened: 30 July 1968

Tenant
- Jeju United (2007–2011)

The Jeju Stadium (Korean: 제주종합경기장; Hanja: 濟州綜合競技場) is a multi-purpose stadium in Jeju City, Jeju Province, South Korea. The stadium was used by K League team Jeju United between 2007 and 2011. It has a capacity of 16,387 people and was opened in 1968.

The stadium was used for the first leg of Jeju United's 2017 AFC Champions League round of 16 match against Urawa Red Diamonds, as their regular stadium, Jeju World Cup Stadium, was used for the 2017 FIFA U-20 World Cup.
