= Yoon Jung-chun =

South Korean footballer and coach

Yoon Jung-Chun
Personal information
- Full name: Yoon Jung-Chun
- Date of birth: 18 February 1973
- Place of birth: South Korea
- Date of death: 1 September 2014 (aged 41)
- Position: Midfielder

Senior career*
| Years | Team | Apps | (Gls) |
| 1992–2004 | Yukong Elephants / Bucheon SK | 198 | (19) |
| 2005 | Daejeon Citizen | 7 | (1) |
| 2010–2012 | Gyeongju Citizen | | |

International career
- South Korea U-23

Managerial career
- 2007–?: Jaehyun High School (coach)
- 2010–2012: Gyeongju Citizen (playing coach)
- 2013–2014: Bucheon FC 1995 (coach)
- * Club domestic league appearances and goals

Yoon Jung-Chun (Korean: 윤정춘; 18 February 1973 - 1 September 2014) was a South Korean footballer and football coach.
