= Cheonan Oryong Stadium =

1983–2009 stadium in Seoul, South Korea

Coordinates: 36°48′45.71″N 127°9′44.32″E

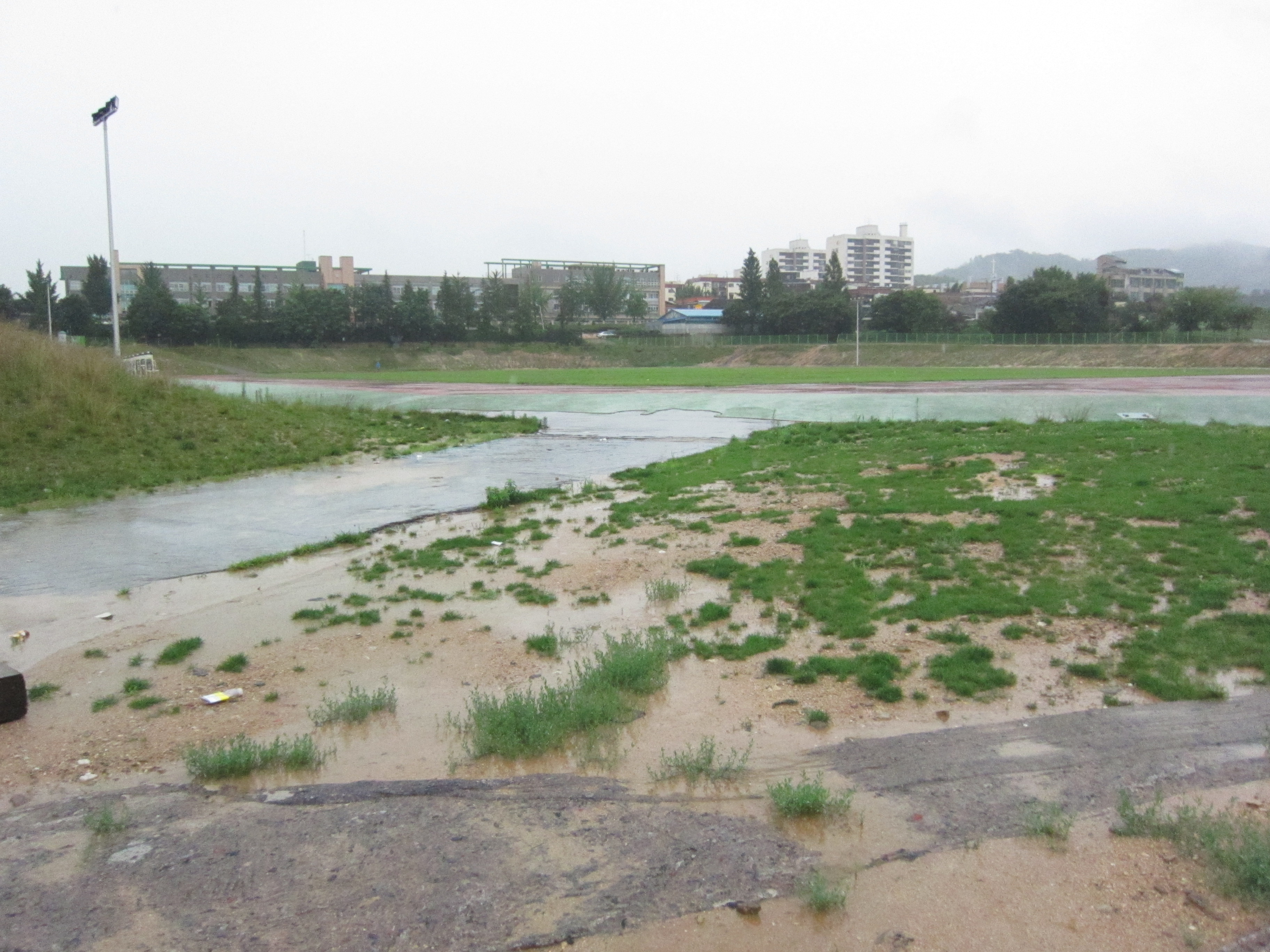
- Interactive map of Cheonan Oryong Stadium
- Location: 31-15 Wonseong-dong, Dongnam-gu, Cheonan-si, Chungcheongnam-do, South Korea
- Owner: City of Cheonan
- Operator: City of Cheonan
- Capacity: 21,000
- Surface: Natural grass

Construction
- Groundbreaking: June 1, 1978
- Opened: January 15, 1983
- Demolished: May 14, 2009

Tenant
- Lucky-Goldstar Hwangso (1987–1989); Cheonan Ilhwa Chunma (1996–1999)

Cheonan Oryong Stadium (Oryong Civic Stadium) was a multi-use stadium in Cheonan, South Korea. It was used mostly for football matches. The stadium had a capacity of 21,000 people and opened in 1983. The stadium was demolished in 2009.

== Other Stadia in Cheonan ==
Cheonan Baekseok Stadium is located about N ~500m, W ~3.0 km from Cheonan Yeok (Station).
