= Ajou University =

University in Suwon, South Korea

Coordinates: 37.282913°N 127.04607°E

- Motto: 人間尊重 인간존중, 實事求是 실사구시, 世界一家 세계일가
- Motto in English: Respect for human, Seeking truth from facts, One world, One family
- Type: Private
- Established: 1973
- President: Choi Kee-Choo
- Academic staff: 1,370
- Administrative staff: 300
- Students: 13,986
- Undergraduates: 9,705
- Postgraduates: 4,007
- Doctoral students: 494
- Location: 206 World Cup-ro, Yeongtong-gu, Suwon, Gyeonggi-do, South Korea
- Campus: Urban
- Colors: Blue; Yellow
- Mascot: Pioneer
- Website: ajou.ac.kr

Korean name
- Hangul: 아주대학교
- Hanja: 亞洲大學校
- RR: Aju daehakgyo
- MR: Aju taehakkyo

Ajou University (Korean: 아주대학교) is a private research university located in Suwon, Gyeonggi-do, South Korea. It was founded in 1973. Ajou University started as Ajou Engineering College with the aim of exchanging technology and culture through education between the French and South Korean governments.

Ajou is located on a single campus with Ajou University Hospital, Gwanggyo Bio-Techno Valley, Samsung Electronics headquarters, and CJ Blossom Park, a food bio-convergence research institute. Gyeonggi-do Pharmaceutical Association has signed MOUs with Ajou.

Ajou has established an advanced college of bio-convergence engineering that combines Biology, Biological engineering, medicine, pharmacy, chemistry, artificial intelligence, and mechanical engineering to protect human lives and help solve issues related to aging, diseases, health foods, and environmentally friendly materials.

There is Ajou University Hospital, an affiliated hospital of the medical school.

In 2020, Ajou established a campus in Tashkent, Uzbekistan.

== Notable academic programs ==
- Exchange student: As of 2021, the exchange program was held with 325 schools in 67 countries. It is a program that exchanges students with foreign universities and institutions where academic exchange agreements are signed. By paying tuition to their home university, students can study at an overseas university for a semester and transfer up to 6 credits to their home university. Ajou is a member of ISEP (International Student Exchange Program), CREPUQ (Conference of Rectors and Principals of Quebec Universities), HUMAP (Hyogo University Mobility in Asia and the Pacific), "n+i" Network(French Union of Technology Universities), AUF(Federation of French Universities).
- Multiple degrees: A program that takes 1/2 of its graduation credits and takes the remaining credits from other schools, earning both Ajou University and other schools' degrees. It is currently operated by the Illinois Institute of Technology and Stony Brook University in the United States.
- Blue Ladder: The business of the Ministry of Education of Korea. Despite the difficult environment, it supports overseas training experiences to college students who have dreams and passion for self-development and career development. Each university in charge selects students and proceeds with the program. Ajou University was selected in 2018 and runs for three years. The schools consist of the University of Michigan and the University of Washington in the United States, and Shanghai Transportation University in China.
- Global Internship: A program that sends students to companies in 20 countries around the world for internships to provide more diverse and challenging overseas experience opportunities. It will provide opportunities to learn the senses and explore career in overseas industrial sites related to majors. It will be dispatched to INKE (World Korean Venture Network), IDB (US Development Bank), KOTRA (Korea Trade and Investment Promotion Corporation), CKP (USA Asia Accounting Corporation), W-OKTA (World Korean Trade Association), HMART, etc. It is recognized as credit for the third and fourth grade internship courses.
- Short-term dispatch: It is a program that is sends students abroad to sister universities for about four weeks during the vacation. Participation in language training, international training programs, etc. at sister universities may be recognized as credits. Part of the program participation fee may be supported by scholarships.
- Global Leadership in Business Administration
- ABIZ Global Supporter(AGS)

== Reputation and rankings ==
University rankings
JoongAng National	Domestic	12
QS National	General	19
THE National	General	14–17
ARWU National	Research	24–29
QS Asia (Asia version)	General	=124
THE Asia (Asia version)	General	101
ARWU World	Research	801–900
QS World	General	=563
THE World	General	501–600
USNWR World	General	=1253
THE World (Young)	General/Young	101–150

- 2025 QS: World 631~640th
- 2024 QS: World 631~640th
- 2023 QS: World 488th
- 2021 QS 50 Under 50: World 101-150th.
- 2019 JoongAng Ilbo University Evaluation(Korean Press): Nation 11th.
- 2019 Employment and Start-up Evaluation of Hankyung(Korean Press): Nation 5th.
- 2021 WURI Global Top 100 Innovative Universities: World 62nd.
- 2019 REUTERS Asia Pacific's Most Innovative Universities: Asia 24th.
- 2021 THE Impact Rankings: 201-300th.

== Education programs ==
Undergraduate	Graduate School
College of Engineering; College of Information and Technology; College of Computing and Informatics; Advanced College of Bio-convergence Engineering; School of Medicine; College of Nursing; College of Pharmacy; College of Natural Sciences; School of Business; College of Humanities; College of Social Sciences; Dasan University College(Liberal Arts); Division of International Studies	affiliated graduate schools; Graduate School of International Studies; Graduate School of Engineering; Graduate School of Transportation/Intelligent Transport Systems; Graduate School of Information and communication Technology; Graduate School of IT Convergence; Graduate School of Public Health; Graduate School of Clinical Dentistry; Graduate School of Clinical Pharmacy and Pharmaceutics; Graduate School of Business; Graduate School of Education; Graduate School of Public Affairs; Law School

Ajou Medical School

Ajou Electronics Lab

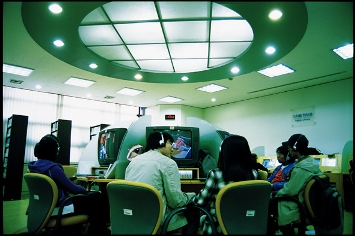
Digital Library at Ajou University

A student on a bench next to the dormitory cafeteria

== Symbol ==
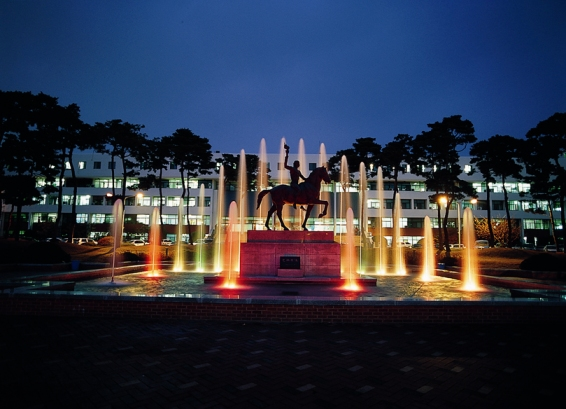
The Statue of Pioneer

The Statue of Pioneer, located at the school's main entrance, is the symbol of Ajou University.

== Central Library ==
In order to contribute to the learning, cultivation and research of students and faculty members through the collection, accumulation and distribution of information, the Central Library was established on March 15, 1973. It was opened together with the opening of the prefecture elementary and junior college. At the time of opening, there were 120 seats of the first floor of the main building. From April 12, 1973, 1,272 books were purchased. In 1983, Kim Dae-woo, the chairman of the Daewoo Group, donated 5 billion won to renovate the Central Library. The new total floor space was 4,026 pyeong. On October 16, 2017, the entire second floor was remodeled into a community lounge, and the space that was previously used for the corridor on the first floor was expanded to build a café, rest area, and convenience facilities.

=== Dining halls ===
The campus is mainly served by two large cafeterias and small restaurants. The Dormitory Restaurant is close to the dormitories and is the biggest restaurant. It has two floors and serves both Korean and Western style foods with a daily rotating menu. The second biggest restaurant is called the Student Restaurant, located in the Student Union building. There are also smaller restaurants in Paldal hall, Dasan hall and Jonghap Hall.

=== Dormitories ===
There are five big dormitories on campus: Nam-jae dormitory, Yong-Ji dormitory, Hwa-hong dormitory, Kwang-Gyu dormitory, and the newly built International dormitory. Nam-jae and Yong-ji dormitories are exclusively boys dormitories, while Kwang-gyu is a girls dormitory. Hwa-hong houses both males and females (on separate floors; girls' floors are female-keycard access only) and is open to foreigners as exchange students or regular students, along with the International dormitory. Except for Hwa-hong and International dormitory, all the dormitories house four occupants in each room. International and Hwa-hong have two-bed rooms, four-bed rooms, and single rooms for visiting professors. Ajou University International Dormitory VIDEO

== Notable alumni ==
- Ahn Jung-Hwan, football player
- Ha Seok-Ju, football player
- Jee Seok-jin, entertainer
- Kim Ji-hoon, actor
- Dharmaraj K.C. Member of Parliament, RSP, Nepal
- Lee Min-Sung, football player
- Woo Sung-Yong, football player
- Eon Tae Ha, CEO of Hyundai Motor Company
- Lee Guk-jong, head of the trauma lab at the University Institute for Advanced Medicine, trauma specialist.
- Chi Hwan Lee, biomedical engineer, academic, and researcher
- Suh Jin-suck, medical professor

== Four seasons at Ajou ==
Winter

Spring

Summer

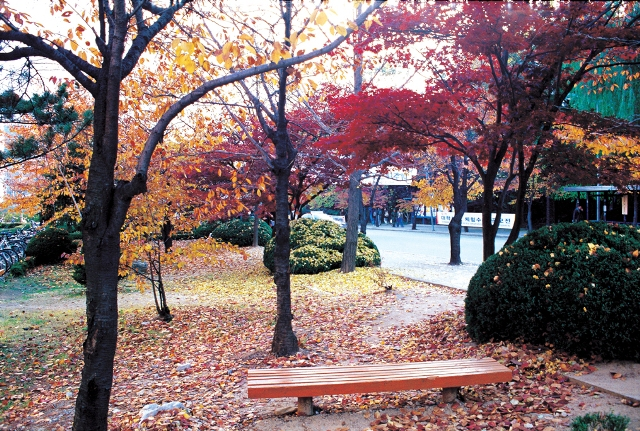
Fall

== See also ==
- Education in South Korea
