= Jeonnam Dragons =

South Korean professional football club

- Full name: Jeonnam Dragons Football Club 전남 드래곤즈
- Founded: 16 December 1994; 31 years ago
- Ground: Gwangyang Football Stadium
- Capacity: 13,496
- Owner: POSCO
- Chairman: Park Se-yeon
- Manager: Lim Kwan-sik
- League: K League 2
- 2025: K League 2, 6th of 14
- Website: www.dragons.co.kr
Home colours	Away colours	Third colours

The Jeonnam Dragons (Korean: 전남 드래곤즈 FC) are a South Korean professional football club based in the city of Gwangyang, Jeonnam-Gwangju that competes in the K League 2, the second tier of South Korean football. The Dragons play their home matches at the Gwangyang Football Stadium, one of the first football-specific stadiums in South Korea. They have won the Korean FA Cup four times (1997, 2006, 2007 and 2021) and were the runners-up of the K League in 1997. They also reached the final of the 1998–99 Asian Cup Winners' Cup, where they lost to Al Ittihad.

== History ==
The club was founded on 16 December 1994 as Chunnam Dragons, and appointed former South Korean international Jung Byung-tak as their first manager to oversee their first ever league match which took place on 25 March 1995. Chunnam started life slowly with mid-table finishes during its first few years, but recorded their best ever finish in 1997 when they finished as K League runners-up. In the same year, however, they won their first trophy after winning the 1997 Korean FA Cup, beating Cheonan Ilhwa Chunma 1–0 in the final. In 1999, they finished as runners-up of the Asian Cup Winners' Cup after beating J-League giants Kashima Antlers 4–1 in the semi-finals, and losing 3–2 against Al Ittihad of Saudi Arabia in the final.

In 2006 and 2007, Jeonnam won two consecutive Korean FA Cup titles, defeating Suwon Samsung Bluewings and Pohang Steelers, respectively, in the finals.

On 27 December 2007, Jeonnam appointed Park Hang-seo as its new manager after former manager Huh Jung-moo was appointed to the South Korean national team.

In 2021, Jeonnam became the first K League 2 side ever to win the FA Cup when they beat Daegu FC in the final to claim their fourth title.

== Current squad ==
As of 19 August 2026

Note: Flags indicate national team as defined under FIFA eligibility rules; some limited exceptions apply. Players may hold more than one non-FIFA nationality.

No.	Pos.	Nation	Player
1	GK	KOR	Choi Bong-jin (vice-captain)
2	DF	KOR	Yoo Ji-ha (vice-captain)
3	DF	KOR	Kim Ju-yeop
4	DF	KOR	Ku Hyun-jun
5	DF	KOR	Jang Soon-hyuk
7	MF	KOR	Choi Han-sol (vice-captain)
8	MF	KOR	Park Tae-yong
9	FW	KOR	Ha Nam
10	FW	BRA	Valdívia (captain)
11	FW	KOR	Jeong Ji-yong
13	DF	KOR	Kim Yong-hwan
14	MF	KOR	Yoon Min-ho
16	DF	KOR	Song Ho
17	FW	KOR	Kim Beom-soo (on loan from Pohang Steelers)
19	FW	BRA	Ronan
20	MF	KOR	Jung Tae-in
21	MF	KOR	Yang Ji-san

No.	Pos.	Nation	Player
22	DF	KOR	Hong Seok-hyeon
23	DF	KOR	Kim Gyeong-jae
24	DF	KOR	Cho Young-kwang (on loan from FC Seoul)
26	FW	KOR	Kim Min-seok
27	FW	GEO	Irakli Bugridze
28	FW	KOR	Yoon Young-seok
31	GK	KOR	Jo Min-hyeop
32	FW	KOR	Chu Sang-hun
34	MF	KOR	Jang Yun-ho
44	DF	KOR	Noh Dong-geon
47	FW	KOR	Son Gun-ho
75	DF	KOR	Ryu Gwang-hyun
79	FW	BRA	Mirandinha (on loan from Guarani FC)
88	GK	KOR	Lee Jun-hee
96	FW	KOR	Kim Kyung-jun
97	DF	KOR	Kim Ju-heon
99	FW	KOR	Jeong Kang-min

=== Out on loan ===
Note: Flags indicate national team as defined under FIFA eligibility rules; some limited exceptions apply. Players may hold more than one non-FIFA nationality.

No.	Pos.	Nation	Player
—	GK	KOR	Lee Jun (at Geoje Citizen for military service)
—	GK	KOR	Sung Yoon-soo (at Geumsan Insam for military service)
—	DF	KOR	Jang Hyo-jun (at Jinju Citizen for military service)
—	MF	KOR	Hong Won-jin (at Gimcheon Sangmu for military service)

No.	Pos.	Nation	Player
—	FW	KOR	Hong Jin-min (at Daejeon Korail)
—	FW	KOR	Kim Do-yoon (at Jinju Citizen for military service)
—	FW	KOR	Lee Dong-hyun (at Chuncheon FC)

== Coaching staff ==
Position	Name
Manager	(South Korea) Lim Kwan-sik
Head coach	(South Korea) Kim Hyo-il
Coach	(South Korea) Lee Jong-ho
Goalkeeping coach	(South Korea) Shin Hwa-yong
Physical coach	(South Korea) Kim Sung-joon
Analytics coach	(South Korea) Kim Seo-ki
Advisor	(South Korea) Park Dong-hyuk

== Honours ==
=== Domestic ===
==== League ====
- K League 1

Runners-up (1): 1997

==== Cups ====
- FA Cup

Winners (4): 1997, 2006, 2007, 2021
Runners-up (1): 2003

- League Cup

Runners-up (3): 1997, 2000s, 2008

=== International ===
- Asian Cup Winners' Cup

Runners-up (1): 1999

== Season-by-season records ==
Season	Division	Tms.	Pos.	Korean Cup	AFC CL
1995	1	8	5	—	—
1996	1	9	6	Quarter-final	—
1997	1	10	2	Winners	—
1998	1	10	4	Semi-final	—
1999	1	10	3	Quarter-final	—
2000	1	10	7	Round of 16	—
2001	1	10	8	Round of 16	—
2002	1	10	5	Quarter-final	—
2003	1	12	4	Runners-up	—
2004	1	13	3	Quarter-final	—
2005	1	13	11	Semi-final	—
2006	1	14	6	Winners	—
2007	1	14	10	Winners	Group stage
2008	1	14	9	Round of 16	Group stage
2009	1	15	4	Quarter-final	—
2010	1	15	9	Semi-final	—
2011	1	16	7	Quarter-final	—
2012	1	16	11	Round of 16	—
2013	1	14	10	Round of 16	—
2014	1	12	7	Round of 32	—
2015	1	12	9	Semi-final	—
2016	1	12	5	Quarter-final	—
2017	1	12	10	Quarter-final	—
2018	1	12	12	Semi-final	—
2019	2	10	6	Third round	—
2020	2	10	6	Round of 16	—
2021	2	10	4	Winners	—
2022	2	11	11	Round of 16	Group stage
2023	2	13	7	Round of 16	—
2024	2	13	4	Third round	—
2025	2	14	6	Second round	—

Key

- Tms. = Number of teams
- Pos. = Position in league

== AFC Champions League record ==
All results list Jeonnam's goal tally first.

Season	Round	Opposition	Home	Away	Agg.
2007	Group F	(Thailand) Bangkok University	3–2	0–0	2nd
2007	Group F	(Indonesia) Arema	2–0	1–0	2nd
2007	Group F	(Japan) Kawasaki Frontale	1–3	0–3	2nd
2008	Group G	(Australia) Melbourne Victory	1–1	0–2	3rd
2008	Group G	(Japan) Gamba Osaka	3–4	1–1	3rd
2008	Group G	(Thailand) Chonburi	1–0	2–2	3rd
2022	Group G	(Philippines) United City	2–0 (Note: Played at a neutral venue.)	1–0	3rd
2022	Group G	(Thailand) BG Pathum United	0–2	0–0	3rd
2022	Group G	(Australia) Melbourne City	1–1	1–2	3rd

== Managers ==
List of Jeonnam Dragons managers
No.	Name	From	To	Season(s)
1	(South Korea) Jung Byung-tak	1994/10/24	1996/05/27	1995–1996
2	(South Korea) Huh Jung-moo	1996/05/27	1998/10/14	1996–1998
3	(South Korea) Lee Hoe-taik	1998/09/23	2003/11/30	1998–2003
4	(South Korea) Lee Jang-soo	2003/12/16	2004/12/05	2004
5	(South Korea) Huh Jung-moo	2004/12/22	2007/12/07	2005–2007
6	(South Korea) Park Hang-seo	2007/12/27	2010/11/05	2008–2010
7	(South Korea) Jung Hae-seong	2010/11/10	2012/08/10	2011–2012
C	(South Korea) Yoon Deok-yeo	2012/08/10	2012/08/12	2012
8	(South Korea) Ha Seok-ju	2012/08/16	2014/11/29	2012–2014
9	(South Korea) Roh Sang-rae	2014/11/30	2016/10/14	2015–2016
10	(South Korea) Song Kyung-sub	2016/10/14	2016/12/29	2016
11	(South Korea) Roh Sang-rae	2016/12/30	2017/12/04	2017
12	(South Korea) Yoo Sang-chul	2017/12/04	2018/08/16	2018
C	(South Korea) Kim In-wan	2018/08/16	2018/12/03	2018
13	(Brazil) Fabiano	2019/01/02	2019/07/29	2019
14	(South Korea) Jeon Kyung-jun	2019/11/20	2022/06/05	2019–2022
15	(South Korea) Lee Jang-kwan	2022/06/09	2024/11/27	2022–2024
16	(South Korea) Kim Hyun-seok	2024/12/10	2025/12/15	2025
17	(South Korea) Park Dong-hyuk	2025/12/16	2026/04/27	2026
18	(South Korea) Lim Kwan-sik	2026/04/30		2026–
