= 1954 FIFA World Cup squads =

Below are the squads for the 1954 FIFA World Cup final tournament in Switzerland. Each team had to submit a squad of 22 players. All the teams included three goalkeepers, except England, Mexico, Scotland, South Korea, Uruguay and Yugoslavia, who only named two. This was the first World Cup for which the players were assigned squad numbers.

Scotland were the only team to have players from foreign clubs (namely 7 players from English clubs).

== Group 1 ==
=== Brazil ===
Head coach: Zezé Moreira

No.	Pos.	Player	Date of birth (age)	Caps	Club
1	GK	Castilho	27 November 1927 (aged 26)	13	(Brazil) Fluminense
2	DF	Djalma Santos	27 February 1929 (aged 25)	15	(Brazil) Portuguesa
3	DF	Nílton Santos	16 May 1925 (aged 29)	20	(Brazil) Botafogo
4	DF	Brandãozinho	9 June 1925 (aged 29)	13	(Brazil) Portuguesa
5	MF	Pinheiro	13 January 1932 (aged 22)	13	(Brazil) Fluminense
6	MF	Bauer (c)	21 November 1925 (aged 28)	22	(Brazil) São Paulo FC
7	FW	Julinho	29 July 1929 (aged 24)	14	(Brazil) Portuguesa
8	MF	Didi	8 October 1928 (aged 25)	14	(Brazil) Fluminense
9	FW	Baltazar	14 January 1926 (aged 28)	19	(Brazil) Corinthians
10	FW	Pinga	11 February 1924 (aged 30)	14	(Brazil) Vasco da Gama
11	FW	Rodrigues	27 June 1925 (aged 28)	15	(Brazil) Palmeiras
12	DF	Paulinho	15 April 1932 (aged 22)	0	(Brazil) Vasco da Gama
13	DF	Alfredo	27 October 1924 (aged 29)	2	(Brazil) São Paulo FC
14	MF	Ely	14 May 1921 (aged 33)	17	(Brazil) Vasco da Gama
15	DF	Mauro Ramos	30 August 1930 (aged 23)	6	(Brazil) São Paulo FC
16	MF	Dequinha	19 March 1928 (aged 26)	0	(Brazil) Flamengo
17	FW	Maurinho	6 June 1933 (aged 21)	1	(Brazil) São Paulo FC
18	FW	Humberto	4 February 1934 (aged 20)	4	(Brazil) Palmeiras
19	FW	Índio	1 March 1931 (aged 23)	0	(Brazil) Flamengo
20	FW	Rubens	4 November 1928 (aged 25)	1	(Brazil) Flamengo
21	GK	Veludo	7 August 1930 (aged 23)	4	(Brazil) Fluminense
22	GK	Cabeção	23 August 1930 (aged 23)		(Brazil) Corinthians

=== Yugoslavia ===
Head coach: Aleksandar Tirnanić

No.	Pos.	Player	Date of birth (age)	Caps	Club
1	GK	Vladimir Beara	2 November 1928 (aged 25)	25	(Socialist Federal Republic of Yugoslavia) Hajduk Split
2	DF	Branko Stanković	31 October 1921 (aged 32)	50	(Socialist Federal Republic of Yugoslavia) Red Star Belgrade
3	DF	Tomislav Crnković	17 June 1929 (aged 24)	17	(Socialist Federal Republic of Yugoslavia) Dinamo Zagreb
4	MF	Zlatko Čajkovski	24 November 1923 (aged 30)	53	(Socialist Federal Republic of Yugoslavia) Partizan Belgrade
5	DF	Ivica Horvat	16 July 1926 (aged 27)	43	(Socialist Federal Republic of Yugoslavia) Dinamo Zagreb
6	DF	Vujadin Boškov	16 May 1931 (aged 23)	22	(Socialist Federal Republic of Yugoslavia) Vojvodina Novi Sad
7	FW	Tihomir Ognjanov	2 March 1927 (aged 27)	22	(Socialist Federal Republic of Yugoslavia) Spartak Subotica
8	FW	Rajko Mitić	19 November 1922 (aged 31)	47	(Socialist Federal Republic of Yugoslavia) Red Star Belgrade
9	FW	Bernard Vukas	1 May 1927 (aged 27)	35	(Socialist Federal Republic of Yugoslavia) Hajduk Split
10	MF	Stjepan Bobek (c)	3 December 1923 (aged 30)	53	(Socialist Federal Republic of Yugoslavia) Partizan Belgrade
11	FW	Branko Zebec	17 May 1929 (aged 25)	22	(Socialist Federal Republic of Yugoslavia) Partizan Belgrade
12	GK	Branko Kralj	10 March 1924 (aged 30)	0	(Socialist Federal Republic of Yugoslavia) Dinamo Zagreb
13	DF	Miljan Zeković	15 November 1925 (aged 28)	3	(Socialist Federal Republic of Yugoslavia) Red Star Belgrade
14	MF	Lav Mantula	8 December 1928 (aged 25)	0	(Socialist Federal Republic of Yugoslavia) Dinamo Zagreb
15	MF	Ljubiša Spajić	7 March 1926 (aged 28)	6	(Socialist Federal Republic of Yugoslavia) Red Star Belgrade
16	DF	Sima Milovanov	10 April 1923 (aged 31)	4	(Socialist Federal Republic of Yugoslavia) Vojvodina Novi Sad
17	DF	Bruno Belin	16 January 1929 (aged 25)	3	(Socialist Federal Republic of Yugoslavia) Partizan Belgrade
18	FW	Miloš Milutinović	5 February 1933 (aged 21)	8	(Socialist Federal Republic of Yugoslavia) Partizan Belgrade
19	MF	Zlatko Papec	17 January 1934 (aged 20)	2	(Socialist Federal Republic of Yugoslavia) Lokomotiva Zagreb
20	FW	Dionizije Dvornić	27 April 1926 (aged 28)	3	(Socialist Federal Republic of Yugoslavia) Dinamo Zagreb
21	FW	Todor Veselinović	22 October 1930 (aged 23)	4	(Socialist Federal Republic of Yugoslavia) Vojvodina Novi Sad
22	FW	Aleksandar Petaković	6 February 1930 (aged 24)	0	(Socialist Federal Republic of Yugoslavia) Radnički Belgrade

=== France ===
Head coach: Pierre Pibarot

No.	Pos.	Player	Date of birth (age)	Caps	Club
1	GK	François Remetter	8 August 1928 (aged 25)	4	(France) Metz
2	GK	César Ruminski	14 June 1924 (aged 30)	7	(France) Lille
3	GK	Claude Abbes	24 May 1927 (aged 27)	0	(France) Saint-Étienne
4	DF	Lazare Gianessi	9 November 1925 (aged 28)	12	(France) Monaco
5	DF	Jacques Grimonpon	30 July 1925 (aged 28)	0	(France) Girondins de Bordeaux
6	DF	Raymond Kaelbel	31 January 1932 (aged 22)	0	(France) RC Strasbourg
7	DF	Roger Marche (c)	5 March 1924 (aged 30)	37	(France) Stade de Reims
8	MF	Guillaume Bieganski	3 November 1932 (aged 21)	1	(France) Lille
9	MF	Antoine Cuissard	19 July 1924 (aged 29)	27	(France) Nice
10	DF	Robert Jonquet	3 May 1925 (aged 29)	26	(France) Stade de Reims
11	MF	Xercès Louis	31 October 1926 (aged 27)	0	(France) RC Lens
12	MF	Jean-Jacques Marcel	13 June 1931 (aged 23)	8	(France) FC Sochaux
13	MF	Abderrahmane Mahjoub	25 April 1929 (aged 25)	2	(France) Nice
14	MF	Armand Penverne	26 November 1926 (aged 27)	11	(France) Stade de Reims
15	MF	Abdelaziz Ben Tifour	25 July 1927 (aged 26)	1	(France) Troyes
16	MF	René Dereuddre	26 June 1930 (aged 23)	1	(France) Toulouse FC
17	FW	Léon Glovacki	19 February 1928 (aged 26)	3	(France) Stade de Reims
18	MF	Raymond Kopa	13 October 1931 (aged 22)	13	(France) Stade de Reims
19	MF	Michel Leblond	10 May 1932 (aged 22)	1	(France) Stade de Reims
20	FW	Ernest Schultz	29 January 1931 (aged 23)	0	(France) Lyon
21	FW	André Strappe	23 February 1928 (aged 26)	23	(France) Lille
22	FW	Jean Vincent	29 November 1930 (aged 23)	2	(France) Lille

=== Mexico ===
Head coach: (Spain) Antonio López Herranz

No.	Pos.	Player	Date of birth (age)	Caps	Club
1	GK	Antonio Carbajal	7 June 1929 (aged 25)	11	(Mexico) León
2	DF	Narciso López	18 August 1928 (aged 25)	3	(Mexico) Oro
3	DF	Jorge Romo	20 April 1923 (aged 31)	5	(Mexico) Marte
4	DF	Saturnino Martínez	1 January 1928 (aged 26)	6	(Mexico) Necaxa
5	MF	Raúl Cárdenas	30 October 1928 (aged 25)	4	(Mexico) Puebla
6	MF	Rafael Ávalos	22 November 1925 (aged 28)	4	(Mexico) Atlante
7	FW	Alfredo Torres	31 May 1931 (aged 23)	3	(Mexico) Atlas
8	FW	José Naranjo (c)	19 March 1926 (aged 28)	12	(Mexico) Oro
9	FW	José Luis Lamadrid	3 July 1930 (aged 23)	5	(Mexico) Necaxa
10	FW	Tomás Balcázar	21 December 1931 (aged 22)	9	(Mexico) Guadalajara
11	FW	Raúl Arellano	28 February 1935 (aged 19)	0	(Mexico) Guadalajara
12	GK	Salvador Mota	30 November 1922 (aged 31)	0	(Mexico) Atlante
13	DF	Sergio Bravo	27 November 1927 (aged 26)	6	(Mexico) León
14	DF	Juan Gómez	26 June 1924 (aged 29)	0	(Mexico) Atlas
15	FW	Carlos Blanco	5 March 1928 (aged 26)	4	(Mexico) Necaxa
16	MF	Pedro Nájera	3 February 1929 (aged 25)	0	(Mexico) Club América
17	FW	Carlos Septién	18 January 1923 (aged 31)	13	(Mexico) Tampico
18	FW	Carlos Carus	6 October 1930 (aged 23)	0	(Mexico) Toluca
19	FW	Moises Jinich	15 December 1927 (aged 26)	1	(Mexico) Atlante
20	FW	José Antonio Roca	24 May 1928 (aged 26)	10	(Mexico) Zacatepec
21	MF	Mario Ochoa	7 November 1927 (aged 26)	5	(Mexico) Marte
22	FW	Ranulfo Cortés	9 July 1934 (aged 19)	0	(Mexico) Oro

Roca, Ochoa, Cortes, although registered the official list remained on stand by in Mexico

== Group 2 ==
=== Hungary ===
Head coach: Gusztáv Sebes

No.	Pos.	Player	Date of birth (age)	Caps	Club
1	GK	Gyula Grosics	4 February 1926 (aged 28)	31	(Hungary) Budapesti Honvéd SE
2	DF	Jenő Buzánszky	4 May 1925 (aged 29)	23	(Hungary) Dorogi Bányász
3	DF	Gyula Lóránt	6 February 1923 (aged 31)	24	(Hungary) Budapesti Honvéd SE
4	DF	Mihály Lantos	29 September 1928 (aged 25)	30	(Hungary) Budapesti Vörös Lobogó
5	MF	József Bozsik	25 November 1925 (aged 28)	48	(Hungary) Budapesti Honvéd SE
6	MF	József Zakariás	25 March 1924 (aged 30)	31	(Hungary) Budapesti Vörös Lobogó
7	FW	József Tóth	16 May 1929 (aged 25)	2	(Hungary) Csepeli Vasas
8	FW	Sándor Kocsis	21 September 1929 (aged 24)	36	(Hungary) Budapesti Honvéd SE
9	FW	Nándor Hidegkuti	3 March 1922 (aged 32)	36	(Hungary) Budapesti Vörös Lobogó
10	FW	Ferenc Puskás (c)	2 April 1927 (aged 27)	55	(Hungary) Budapesti Honvéd SE
11	FW	Zoltán Czibor	8 August 1929 (aged 24)	26	(Hungary) Budapesti Honvéd SE
12	DF	Béla Kárpáti	30 September 1929 (aged 24)	1	(Hungary) Győri Vasas SE
13	DF	Pál Várhidi	6 November 1931 (aged 22)	0	(Hungary) Budapesti Dózsa
14	MF	Imre Kovács	26 November 1921 (aged 32)	8	(Hungary) Budapesti Vörös Lobogó
15	MF	Ferenc Szojka	7 April 1931 (aged 23)	0	(Hungary) Salgótarjáni BTC
16	MF	László Budai	19 July 1928 (aged 25)	21	(Hungary) Budapesti Honvéd SE
17	FW	Ferenc Machos	30 June 1932 (aged 21)	0	(Hungary) Budapesti Honvéd SE
18	FW	Lajos Csordás	6 October 1932 (aged 21)	7	(Hungary) Budapesti Vasas SE
19	FW	Péter Palotás	27 June 1929 (aged 24)	16	(Hungary) Budapesti Vörös Lobogó
20	FW	Mihály Tóth	24 September 1926 (aged 27)	3	(Hungary) Budapesti Dózsa
21	GK	Sándor Gellér	12 July 1925 (aged 28)	5	(Hungary) Budapesti Vörös Lobogó
22	GK	Géza Gulyás	5 June 1931 (aged 23)	0	(Hungary) Budapesti Kinizsi

=== West Germany ===
Head coach: Sepp Herberger

No.	Pos.	Player	Date of birth (age)	Caps	Club
1	GK	Toni Turek	18 January 1919 (aged 35)	14	(West Germany) Fortuna Düsseldorf
2	DF	Fritz Laband	1 November 1925 (aged 28)	1	(West Germany) Hamburger SV
3	DF	Werner Kohlmeyer	19 April 1924 (aged 30)	13	(West Germany) 1. FC Kaiserslautern
4	DF	Hans Bauer	28 July 1927 (aged 26)	2	(West Germany) Bayern Munich
5	DF	Herbert Erhardt	6 July 1930 (aged 23)	1	(West Germany) SpVgg Fürth
6	MF	Horst Eckel	8 February 1932 (aged 22)	8	(West Germany) 1. FC Kaiserslautern
7	DF	Josef Posipal	20 June 1927 (aged 26)	16	(West Germany) Hamburger SV
8	MF	Karl Mai	27 July 1928 (aged 25)	3	(West Germany) SpVgg Fürth
9	MF	Paul Mebus	9 June 1920 (aged 34)	5	(West Germany) 1. FC Köln
10	DF	Werner Liebrich	18 January 1927 (aged 27)	3	(West Germany) 1. FC Kaiserslautern
11	MF	Karl-Heinz Metzner	9 January 1923 (aged 31)	2	(West Germany) KSV Hessen Kassel
12	FW	Helmut Rahn	16 August 1929 (aged 24)	10	(West Germany) Rot-Weiss Essen
13	FW	Max Morlock	11 May 1925 (aged 29)	13	(West Germany) 1. FC Nürnberg
14	FW	Bernhard Klodt	26 October 1926 (aged 27)	6	(West Germany) FC Schalke 04
15	FW	Ottmar Walter	6 March 1924 (aged 30)	12	(West Germany) 1. FC Kaiserslautern
16	FW	Fritz Walter (c)	31 October 1920 (aged 33)	39	(West Germany) 1. FC Kaiserslautern
17	FW	Richard Herrmann	28 January 1923 (aged 31)	7	(West Germany) FSV Frankfurt
18	FW	Ulrich Biesinger	6 August 1933 (aged 20)	0	(West Germany) BC Augsburg
19	MF	Alfred Pfaff	16 July 1926 (aged 27)	1	(West Germany) Eintracht Frankfurt
20	FW	Hans Schäfer	19 October 1927 (aged 26)	6	(West Germany) 1. FC Köln
21	GK	Heinz Kubsch	20 July 1930 (aged 23)	1	(West Germany) FK Pirmasens
22	GK	Heinz Kwiatkowski	16 July 1926 (aged 27)	0	(West Germany) Borussia Dortmund

=== Turkey ===
Head coach: (Italy) Sandro Puppo

No.	Pos.	Player	Date of birth (age)	Caps	Club
1	GK	Turgay Şeren (c)	15 May 1932 (aged 22)	11	(Turkey) Galatasaray
2	DF	Rıdvan Bolatlı	2 December 1928 (aged 25)	2	(Turkey) Karagücü
3	DF	Basri Dirimlili	7 June 1929 (aged 25)	3	(Turkey) Fenerbahçe
4	DF	Mustafa Ertan	21 April 1926 (aged 28)	4	(Turkey) Karagücü
5	MF	Çetin Zeybek	12 September 1932 (aged 21)	2	(Turkey) Kasımpaşa
6	MF	Rober Eryol	21 December 1930 (aged 23)	5	(Turkey) Galatasaray
7	FW	Erol Keskin	2 March 1927 (aged 27)	1	(Turkey) Adalet SK Istanbul
8	FW	Suat Mamat	8 November 1930 (aged 23)	2	(Turkey) Galatasaray
9	FW	Feridun Buğeker	5 April 1933 (aged 21)	3	(Turkey) Fenerbahçe
10	FW	Burhan Sargun	11 February 1929 (aged 25)	5	(Turkey) Fenerbahçe
11	FW	Lefter Küçükandonyadis	22 December 1925 (aged 28)	3	(Turkey) Fenerbahçe
12	GK	Şükrü Ersoy	14 January 1934 (aged 20)	3	(Turkey) Karagücü
13	DF	Bülent Eken	26 October 1923 (aged 30)	0	(Turkey) Galatasaray
14	DF	Ali Beratlıgil	21 October 1931 (aged 22)	2	(Turkey) Galatasaray
15	MF	Mehmet Dinçer	20 February 1933 (aged 21)	0	(Turkey) Adalet SK Istanbul
16	DF	Nedim Günar	2 January 1932 (aged 22)	0	(Turkey) Fenerbahçe
17	DF	Naci Erdem	28 January 1931 (aged 23)	0	(Turkey) Fenerbahçe
18	DF	Akgün Kaçmaz	19 February 1935 (aged 19)	1	(Turkey) Fenerbahçe
19	DF	Ahmet Berman	6 October 1932 (aged 21)	0	(Turkey) Karagümrük
20	FW	Necmi Onarıcı	2 November 1925 (aged 28)	0	(Turkey) Adalet SK Istanbul
21	FW	Kadri Aytaç	6 August 1931 (aged 22)	0	(Turkey) Galatasaray
22	FW	Coşkun Taş	23 April 1934 (aged 20)	2	(Turkey) Beşiktaş

Gurbuz, Günar and Aytaç, although registered the official list remained on stand by in Turkey.

=== South Korea ===
Head coach: (South Korea) Kim Yong-sik

No.	Pos.	Player	Date of birth (age)	Caps	Club
1	GK	Hong Deok-young	5 May 1921 (aged 33)	2	(South Korea) Chosun Textile Company FC
2	DF	Park Kyu-chung	21 April 1915 (aged 39)	2	(South Korea) ROK Army Quartermaster Corps FC
3	DF	Park Jae-seung	1 April 1923 (aged 31)	0	(South Korea) ROK Army Counterintelligence Corps FC
4	MF	Kang Chang-gi	28 August 1927 (aged 26)	0	(South Korea) Chosun Textile Company FC
5	MF	Lee Sang-yi	1 January 1922 (aged 32)	?	(South Korea) Chosun Textile Company FC
6	DF	Min Byung-dae	20 February 1918 (aged 36)	2	(South Korea) ROK Army Counterintelligence Corps FC
7	FW	Lee Soo-nam	2 February 1927 (aged 27)	0	(South Korea) ROK Army Counterintelligence Corps FC
8	FW	Choi Chung-min	30 August 1930 (aged 23)	0	(South Korea) ROK Army Counterintelligence Corps FC
9	FW	Woo Sang-kwon	2 February 1926 (aged 28)	2	(South Korea) ROK Armed Forces Military Police Command FC
10	FW	Sung Nak-woon	2 February 1926 (aged 28)	0	(South Korea) ROK Army Quartermaster Corps FC
11	MF	Chung Nam-sik	16 February 1917 (aged 37)	2	(South Korea) ROK Counterintelligence Corps FC
12	GK	Ham Heung-chul	17 November 1930 (aged 23)	3	(South Korea) ROK Armed Forces Military Police Command FC
13	DF	Li Jong-kap	18 March 1920 (aged 34)	0	(South Korea) ROK Counterintelligence Corps FC
14	DF	Han Chang-wha	3 November 1922 (aged 31)	0	(South Korea) ROK Counterintelligence Corps FC
15	MF	Kim Ji-sung	7 November 1924 (aged 29)	0	(South Korea) ROK Counterintelligence Corps FC
16	MF	Chu Yung-kwang (c)	15 July 1931 (aged 22)	0	(South Korea) ROK Navy FC
17	FW	Park Il-kap	21 March 1926 (aged 28)	0	(South Korea) ROK Counterintelligence Corps FC
18	FW	Choi Yung-keun	8 February 1923 (aged 31)	0	(South Korea) ROK Navy FC
19	FW	Li Ki-joo	12 November 1926 (aged 27)	0	(South Korea) Chosun Textile Company FC
20	FW	Chung Kook-chin	2 January 1917 (aged 37)	2	(South Korea) ROK Navy FC

- Only 20 players in South Korea squad.

== Group 3 ==
=== Uruguay ===
Head coach: Juan López

No.	Pos.	Player	Date of birth (age)	Caps	Club
1	GK	Roque Máspoli	12 October 1917 (aged 36)	31	(Uruguay) Peñarol
2	DF	José Santamaría	31 July 1929 (aged 24)	4	(Uruguay) Nacional
3	DF	William Martínez	13 January 1928 (aged 26)	11	(Uruguay) Rampla Juniors
4	MF	Víctor Rodríguez Andrade	2 May 1927 (aged 27)	22	(Uruguay) Peñarol
5	MF	Obdulio Varela (c)	20 September 1917 (aged 36)	42	(Uruguay) Peñarol
6	MF	Roberto Leopardi	19 July 1933 (aged 20)	3	(Uruguay) Nacional
7	FW	Julio Abbadie	7 September 1930 (aged 23)	9	(Uruguay) Peñarol
8	FW	Juan Hohberg	8 October 1926 (aged 27)	3	(Uruguay) Peñarol
9	FW	Oscar Míguez	5 December 1927 (aged 26)	17	(Uruguay) Peñarol
10	FW	Juan Alberto Schiaffino	28 July 1925 (aged 28)	16	(Uruguay) Peñarol
11	FW	Carlos Borges	14 January 1932 (aged 22)	2	(Uruguay) Peñarol
12	GK	Julio Maceiras	22 April 1926 (aged 28)	1	(Uruguay) Danubio
13	DF	Mirto Davoine	13 February 1933 (aged 21)	1	(Uruguay) Peñarol
14	DF	Eusebio Tejera	6 January 1922 (aged 32)	31	(Uruguay) Defensor
15	MF	Urbano Rivera	1 April 1926 (aged 28)	7	(Uruguay) Danubio
16	MF	Néstor Carballo	3 February 1929 (aged 25)	10	(Uruguay) Nacional
17	MF	Luis Cruz	28 April 1925 (aged 29)	7	(Uruguay) Nacional
18	FW	Rafael Souto	24 October 1930 (aged 23)	5	(Uruguay) Nacional
19	FW	Javier Ambrois	9 May 1932 (aged 22)	7	(Uruguay) Nacional
20	FW	Omar Méndez	7 August 1934 (aged 19)	4	(Uruguay) Nacional
21	FW	Julio Pérez	19 June 1926 (aged 27)	17	(Uruguay) Nacional
22	FW	Luis Castro	31 July 1921 (aged 32)	19	(Uruguay) Defensor

=== Austria ===
Head coach: Walter Nausch

No.	Pos.	Player	Date of birth (age)	Caps	Club
1	GK	Kurt Schmied	14 June 1926 (aged 28)	2	(Austria) First Vienna FC
2	DF	Gerhard Hanappi	16 February 1929 (aged 25)	37	(Austria) Rapid Wien
3	DF	Ernst Happel	29 November 1925 (aged 28)	39	(Austria) Rapid Wien
4	DF	Leopold Barschandt	12 August 1925 (aged 28)	2	(Austria) Wiener Sportclub
5	MF	Ernst Ocwirk (c)	7 March 1926 (aged 28)	45	Austria Wien
6	MF	Karl Koller	9 February 1929 (aged 25)	8	(Austria) First Vienna FC
7	FW	Robert Körner	21 August 1924 (aged 29)	7	(Austria) Rapid Wien
8	FW	Walter Schleger	19 September 1929 (aged 24)	9	Austria Wien
9	FW	Theodor Wagner	6 August 1927 (aged 26)	28	(Austria) Wacker Wien
10	MF	Erich Probst	5 December 1927 (aged 26)	9	(Austria) Rapid Wien
11	FW	Alfred Körner	14 February 1926 (aged 28)	24	(Austria) Rapid Wien
12	MF	Karl Stotz	27 March 1927 (aged 27)	11	Austria Wien
13	MF	Walter Kollmann	17 June 1932 (aged 21)	3	(Austria) Wacker Wien
14	MF	Karl Giesser	29 October 1928 (aged 25)	1	(Austria) Rapid Wien
15	GK	Franz Pelikan	6 November 1925 (aged 28)	6	(Austria) Wacker Wien
16	GK	Walter Zeman	1 May 1927 (aged 27)	39	(Austria) Rapid Wien
17	MF	Alfred Teinitzer	29 July 1929 (aged 24)	0	(Austria) Linzer ASK
18	MF	Johann Riegler	17 July 1929 (aged 24)	3	(Austria) Rapid Wien
19	FW	Robert Dienst	1 March 1928 (aged 26)	16	(Austria) Rapid Wien
20	DF	Paul Halla	10 April 1931 (aged 23)	4	(Austria) Rapid Wien
21	FW	Ernst Stojaspal	14 January 1925 (aged 29)	28	Austria Wien
22	FW	Walter Haummer	22 November 1928 (aged 25)	4	(Austria) Wacker Wien

=== Czechoslovakia ===
Head coach: Karol Borhy

No.	Pos.	Player	Date of birth (age)	Caps	Club
1	GK	Theodor Reimann	10 February 1921 (aged 33)	4	(Czechoslovakia) Slovan Bratislava
2	DF	František Šafránek	2 January 1931 (aged 23)	10	(Czechoslovakia) ÚDA Prague
3	MF	Svatopluk Pluskal	28 October 1930 (aged 23)	3	(Czechoslovakia) ÚDA Prague
4	DF	Ladislav Novák (c)	5 December 1931 (aged 22)	11	(Czechoslovakia) ÚDA Prague
5	DF	Jiří Trnka	2 December 1926 (aged 27)	20	(Czechoslovakia) ÚDA Prague
6	MF	Michal Benedikovič	31 May 1923 (aged 31)	7	(Czechoslovakia) Slovan Bratislava
7	FW	Ladislav Hlaváček	26 June 1925 (aged 28)	13	(Czechoslovakia) ÚDA Prague
8	FW	Otto Hemele	22 January 1926 (aged 28)	8	(Czechoslovakia) ÚDA Prague
9	FW	Anton Malatinský	15 January 1920 (aged 34)	10	(Czechoslovakia) Baník Handlová
10	FW	Emil Pažický	14 October 1927 (aged 26)	14	(Czechoslovakia) Slovan Bratislava
11	FW	Jiří Pešek	4 June 1927 (aged 27)	4	(Czechoslovakia) Spartak Praha Sokolovo
12	DF	Anton Krásnohorský	22 October 1925 (aged 28)	9	(Czechoslovakia) Iskra Žilina
13	MF	Jiří Hledík	19 April 1929 (aged 25)	3	(Czechoslovakia) Křídla vlasti Olomouc
14	MF	Jan Hertl	23 January 1929 (aged 25)	6	(Czechoslovakia) ÚDA Prague
15	FW	Ladislav Kačáni	1 April 1931 (aged 23)	7	(Czechoslovakia) CH Bratislava
16	MF	Zdeněk Procházka	12 January 1928 (aged 26)	1	(Czechoslovakia) Spartak Praha Sokolovo
17	FW	Tadeáš Kraus	22 October 1932 (aged 21)	5	(Czechoslovakia) Křídla vlasti Olomouc
18	FW	Josef Majer	8 June 1925 (aged 29)	0	(Czechoslovakia) Baník Kladno
19	FW	Jaroslav Košnar	17 August 1930 (aged 23)	1	(Czechoslovakia) CH Bratislava
20	FW	Kazimír Gajdoš	28 March 1934 (aged 20)	0	(Czechoslovakia) Tatran Prešov
21	GK	Imrich Stacho	4 November 1931 (aged 22)	6	(Czechoslovakia) Tankista Praha
22	GK	Viliam Schrojf	2 August 1931 (aged 22)	1	(Czechoslovakia) Křídla vlasti Olomouc

=== Scotland ===
Head coach: Andy Beattie

Alex Dowdells had also been appointed the team's trainer. A provisional squad of 18 players was announced to meet World Cup requirements, but a three-man committee later selected a final pool of only 13 players to travel.

No.	Pos.	Player	Date of birth (age)	Caps	Club
1	GK	Fred Martin	13 May 1929 (aged 25)	2	(Scotland) Aberdeen
2	DF	Willie Cunningham (c)	22 February 1925 (aged 29)	3	(England) Preston North End
3	DF	Jock Aird	18 February 1926 (aged 28)	2	(England) Burnley
4	DF	Bobby Evans	16 July 1927 (aged 26)	17	(Scotland) Celtic
5	DF	Tommy Docherty	24 August 1928 (aged 25)	5	(England) Preston North End
6	MF	Jimmy Davidson	8 November 1925 (aged 28)	2	(Scotland) Partick Thistle
7	MF	Doug Cowie	1 May 1926 (aged 28)	6	(Scotland) Dundee
8	FW	John Mackenzie	4 September 1925 (aged 28)	4	(Scotland) Partick Thistle
9	FW	George Hamilton	7 December 1917 (aged 36)	5	(Scotland) Aberdeen
10	FW	Allan Brown	12 October 1926 (aged 27)	12	(England) Blackpool
11	FW	Neil Mochan	6 April 1927 (aged 27)	1	(Scotland) Celtic
12	FW	Willie Fernie	22 November 1928 (aged 25)	1	(Scotland) Celtic
13	FW	Willie Ormond	23 February 1927 (aged 27)	3	(Scotland) Hibernian
14	GK	John Anderson*	8 December 1929 (aged 24)	1	(England) Leicester City
15	FW	Bobby Johnstone*	7 September 1929 (aged 24)	11	(Scotland) Hibernian
16	FW	Jackie Henderson*	17 January 1932 (aged 22)	4	(England) Portsmouth
17	MF	David Mathers*	25 October 1931 (aged 22)	1	(Scotland) Partick Thistle
18	DF	Alex Wilson*	29 October 1933 (aged 20)	1	(England) Portsmouth
19	FW	Jimmy Binning*	25 July 1927 (aged 26)	0	(Scotland) Queen of the South
20	FW	Bobby Combe*	29 February 1924 (aged 30)	3	(Scotland) Hibernian
21	FW	Ernie Copland*	15 April 1927 (aged 27)	0	(Scotland) Raith Rovers
22	FW	Ian McMillan*	18 March 1931 (aged 23)	3	(Scotland) Airdrieonians

- Only 13 members of the squad travelled to Switzerland for the 1954 tournament. Anderson, Henderson, Mathers, Wilson, Binning, Combe, Copland and McMillan were not required to travel and stayed at home on reserve. Johnstone originally travelled with the squad but returned home injured before the tournament started and was replaced by Hamilton.

== Group 4 ==
=== England ===
Head coach: Walter Winterbottom

No.	Pos.	Player	Date of birth (age)	Caps	Club
1	GK	Gil Merrick	26 January 1922 (aged 32)	20	(England) Birmingham City
2	DF	Ron Staniforth	13 April 1924 (aged 30)	3	(England) Huddersfield Town
3	DF	Roger Byrne	8 September 1929 (aged 24)	3	(England) Manchester United
4	MF	Billy Wright (c)	6 February 1924 (aged 30)	58	(England) Wolverhampton Wanderers
5	MF	Syd Owen	28 February 1922 (aged 32)	2	(England) Luton Town
6	MF	Jimmy Dickinson	24 April 1925 (aged 29)	35	(England) Portsmouth
7	FW	Stanley Matthews	1 February 1915 (aged 39)	36	(England) Blackpool
8	FW	Ivor Broadis	18 December 1922 (aged 31)	11	(England) Newcastle United
9	FW	Nat Lofthouse	27 August 1925 (aged 28)	19	(England) Bolton Wanderers
10	FW	Tommy Taylor	29 January 1932 (aged 22)	3	(England) Manchester United
11	FW	Tom Finney	5 April 1922 (aged 32)	51	(England) Preston North End
12	GK	Ted Burgin	29 April 1927 (aged 27)	0	(England) Sheffield United
13	DF	Ken Green	27 April 1924 (aged 30)	0	(England) Birmingham City
14	MF	Bill McGarry	10 June 1927 (aged 27)	0	(England) Huddersfield Town
15	FW	Dennis Wilshaw	11 March 1926 (aged 28)	1	(England) Wolverhampton Wanderers
16	MF	Albert Quixall	9 August 1933 (aged 20)	3	(England) Sheffield Wednesday
17	FW	Jimmy Mullen	6 January 1923 (aged 31)	11	(England) Wolverhampton Wanderers
18	MF	Allenby Chilton*	16 September 1918 (aged 35)	2	(England) Manchester United
19	MF	Ken Armstrong*	3 June 1924 (aged 30)	0	(England) Chelsea
20	FW	Bedford Jezzard*	19 October 1927 (aged 26)	1	(England) Fulham
21	FW	Johnny Haynes*	17 October 1934 (aged 19)	0	(England) Fulham
22	FW	Harry Hooper*	14 June 1933 (aged 21)	0	(England) West Ham United

- Only 17 of the 22 squad members travelled to Switzerland for the 1954 tournament. Five players—Ken Armstrong, Allenby Chilton, Johnny Haynes, Harry Hooper and Bedford Jezzard—were put on reserve status and remained at home awaiting a call if the need arose. It did not happen however.

=== Switzerland ===
Head coach: (Austria) Karl Rappan

No.	Pos.	Player	Date of birth (age)	Caps	Club
1	GK	Walter Eich	27 May 1925 (aged 29)	5	(Switzerland) Young Boys
2	GK	Eugene Parlier	13 February 1929 (aged 25)	5	(Switzerland) Servette
3	GK	Georges Stuber	11 May 1925 (aged 29)	13	(Switzerland) Lausanne Sports
4	MF	Roger Bocquet (c)	9 April 1921 (aged 33)	44	(Switzerland) Lausanne Sports
5	DF	Marcel Flückiger	20 June 1929 (aged 24)	2	(Switzerland) Young Boys
6	DF	Roger Mathis	4 April 1921 (aged 33)	1	(Switzerland) Lausanne Sports
7	DF	André Neury	3 September 1921 (aged 32)	26	(Switzerland) Servette
8	MF	Heinz Bigler	21 December 1925 (aged 28)	3	(Switzerland) Young Boys
9	MF	Charles Casali	27 April 1923 (aged 31)	15	(Switzerland) Young Boys
10	MF	Oliver Eggimann	6 August 1921 (aged 32)	39	(Switzerland) La Chaux-de-Fonds
11	MF	Norbert Eschmann	19 September 1933 (aged 20)	0	(Switzerland) Lausanne Sports
12	MF	Gilbert Fesselet	16 April 1928 (aged 26)	4	(Switzerland) La Chaux-de-Fonds
13	MF	Ivo Frosio	27 April 1930 (aged 24)	7	(Switzerland) Grasshopper Club Zürich
14	DF	Willy Kernen	6 August 1929 (aged 24)	16	(Switzerland) La Chaux-de-Fonds
15	FW	Charles Antenen	3 November 1929 (aged 24)	28	(Switzerland) La Chaux-de-Fonds
16	FW	Robert Ballaman	21 June 1926 (aged 27)	22	(Switzerland) Grasshopper Club Zürich
17	FW	Jacques Fatton	19 December 1925 (aged 28)	48	(Switzerland) Servette
18	FW	Josef Hügi	23 January 1930 (aged 24)	13	(Switzerland) Basel
19	FW	Marcel Mauron	25 March 1929 (aged 25)	4	(Switzerland) La Chaux-de-Fonds
20	FW	Eugen Meier	30 April 1930 (aged 24)	7	(Switzerland) Young Boys
21	FW	Ferdinando Riva	3 July 1930 (aged 23)	6	(Switzerland) Chiasso
22	FW	Roger Vonlanthen	5 December 1930 (aged 23)	10	(Switzerland) Grasshopper Club Zürich

=== Italy ===
Head coach: (Hungary) Lajos Czeizler

No.	Pos.	Player	Date of birth (age)	Caps	Club
1	GK	Giorgio Ghezzi	10 July 1930 (aged 23)	1	(Italy) Internazionale
2	DF	Guido Vincenzi	14 July 1932 (aged 21)	1	(Italy) Internazionale
3	DF	Giovanni Giacomazzi	18 January 1928 (aged 26)	1	(Italy) Internazionale
4	MF	Maino Neri	30 June 1924 (aged 29)	6	(Italy) Internazionale
5	MF	Omero Tognon	3 March 1924 (aged 30)	11	(Italy) Milan
6	MF	Fulvio Nesti	8 June 1925 (aged 29)	2	(Italy) Internazionale
7	FW	Ermes Muccinelli	28 July 1927 (aged 26)	9	(Italy) Juventus
8	FW	Egisto Pandolfini	19 February 1926 (aged 28)	14	(Italy) Roma
9	FW	Carlo Galli	6 March 1931 (aged 23)	2	(Italy) Roma
10	FW	Gino Cappello	2 June 1920 (aged 34)	10	(Italy) Bologna
11	FW	Benito Lorenzi	20 December 1925 (aged 28)	11	(Italy) Internazionale
12	GK	Giovanni Viola	26 June 1926 (aged 27)	0	(Italy) Juventus
13	DF	Ardico Magnini	21 October 1928 (aged 25)	4	(Italy) Fiorentina
14	DF	Sergio Cervato	22 March 1929 (aged 25)	11	(Italy) Fiorentina
15	MF	Giacomo Mari	17 October 1924 (aged 29)	7	(Italy) Sampdoria
16	MF	Rino Ferrario	7 December 1926 (aged 27)	1	(Italy) Juventus
17	FW	Armando Segato	3 May 1930 (aged 24)	3	(Italy) Fiorentina
18	FW	Gino Pivatelli	27 March 1933 (aged 21)	0	(Italy) Bologna
19	FW	Giampiero Boniperti (c)	4 July 1928 (aged 25)	22	(Italy) Juventus
20	MF	Guido Gratton	23 September 1932 (aged 21)	1	(Italy) Fiorentina
21	FW	Amleto Frignani	5 March 1932 (aged 22)	6	(Italy) Milan
22	GK	Leonardo Costagliola	27 October 1921 (aged 32)	3	(Italy) Fiorentina

=== Belgium ===
Head coach: (Scotland) Doug Livingstone

No.	Pos.	Player	Date of birth (age)	Caps	Club
1	GK	Léopold Gernaey	25 February 1927 (aged 27)	7	(Belgium) A.S.V. Oostende K.M.
2	DF	Marcel Dries	19 September 1929 (aged 24)	7	(Belgium) Berchem Sport
3	DF	Alfons Van Brandt	24 June 1927 (aged 26)	19	(Belgium) Lierse
4	DF	Constant Huysmans	11 October 1928 (aged 25)	5	(Belgium) Royal Beerschot AC
5	MF	Louis Carré	7 January 1925 (aged 29)	41	(Belgium) Royal FC Liegeois
6	MF	Victor Mees	26 January 1927 (aged 27)	34	(Belgium) Royal Antwerp FC
7	MF	Jozef Vliers	18 December 1932 (aged 21)	0	(Belgium) Cercle Sportif Tongrois
8	FW	Denis Houf	16 February 1932 (aged 22)	0	(Belgium) Standard Liège
9	FW	Henri Coppens	29 April 1930 (aged 24)	26	(Belgium) Royal Beerschot AC
10	FW	Léopold Anoul	19 August 1922 (aged 31)	45	(Belgium) Royal FC Liegeois
11	FW	Joseph Mermans (c)	16 February 1922 (aged 32)	45	(Belgium) RSC Anderlechtois
12	GK	Charles Geerts	29 October 1930 (aged 23)	0	(Belgium) Royal Beerschot AC
13	DF	Henri Dirickx	7 July 1927 (aged 26)	13	(Belgium) Union St. Gilloise
14	MF	Robert Van Kerkhoven	1 October 1924 (aged 29)	5	(Belgium) Daring Club
15	FW	Hippolyte Van Den Bosch	30 April 1926 (aged 28)	2	(Belgium) RSC Anderlechtois
16	FW	Pieter Van Den Bosch	31 October 1927 (aged 26)	0	(Belgium) RSC Anderlechtois
17	GK	Raymond Ausloos	15 May 1928 (aged 26)	0	(Belgium) White Star
18	DF	Jef Van Der Linden	2 November 1927 (aged 26)	0	(Belgium) Royal Antwerp FC
19	MF	Jo Backaert	5 August 1921 (aged 32)	0	(Belgium) Charleroi SC
20	MF	Robert Maertens	24 January 1930 (aged 24)	11	(Belgium) Royal Antwerp FC
21	MF	Jean Van Steen	2 June 1929 (aged 25)	5	(Belgium) RSC Anderlechtois
22	FW	Luc Van Hoyweghen	7 January 1929 (aged 25)	0	(Belgium) Daring Club

Players numbered 17–22 did not travel to Switzerland.

== Statistics ==
=== Age ===
==== Players ====
===== Outfield players =====
- Oldest: (England national football team) Stanley Matthews (39 years, 4 months and 15 days)
- Youngest: (Mexico national football team) Raúl Arellano (19 years, 3 months and 19 days)

===== Goalkeepers =====
- Oldest: (Uruguay national football team) Roque Máspoli (36 years, 8 months and 4 days)
- Youngest: (Turkey national football team) Şükrü Ersoy (20 years, 5 months and 2 days)

=== Player representation by club ===
Players	Clubs
10	(Austrian Football Association) Rapid Wien
9	(Uruguayan Football Association) Peñarol
8	(Hungarian Football Federation) Budapesti Honvéd SE
8	(Uruguayan Football Association) Nacional
7	(Football Association of the Czech Republic) ÚDA Prague
7	(Turkish Football Federation) Fenerbahçe
6	(French Football Federation) Stade de Reims
6	(Hungarian Football Federation) Budapesti Vörös Lobogó
6	(Italian Football Federation) Internazionale
6	(Turkish Football Federation) Galatasaray
5	(German Football Association) 1. FC Kaiserslautern
5	(Italian Football Federation) Fiorentina
5	(Korea Football Association) ROK Counterintelligence Corps FC
5	(Swiss Football Association) La Chaux-de-Fonds
5	(Football Association of Yugoslavia) Dinamo Zagreb
5	(Football Association of Yugoslavia) Partizan Belgrade
5	(Swiss Football Association) Young Boys
4	(Austrian Football Association) Austria Wien
4	(Austrian Football Association) Wacker Wien
4	(Royal Belgian Football Association) RSC Anderlechtois
4	(Brazilian Football Confederation) Fluminense
4	(Brazilian Football Confederation) São Paulo FC
4	(French Football Federation) Lille
4	(Italian Football Federation) Juventus
4	(Korea Football Association) Chosun Textile Company FC
4	(Korea Football Association) ROK Army Counterintelligence Corps FC
4	(Swiss Football Association) Lausanne Sports
4	(Football Association of Yugoslavia) Red Star Belgrade
3	(Royal Belgian Football Association) Royal Antwerp FC
3	(Royal Belgian Football Association) Royal Beerschot AC
3	(Brazilian Football Confederation) Flamengo
3	(Brazilian Football Confederation) Portuguesa
3	(Brazilian Football Confederation) Vasco da Gama
3	(Football Association of the Czech Republic) Křídla vlasti Olomouc
3	(Football Association of the Czech Republic) Slovan Bratislava
3	(The Football Association) Manchester United
3	(The Football Association) Portsmouth
3	(The Football Association) Preston North End
3	(The Football Association) Wolverhampton Wanderers
3	(Mexican Football Federation) Atlante
3	(Mexican Football Federation) Necaxa
3	(Mexican Football Federation) Oro
3	(Scottish Football Association) Celtic
3	(Scottish Football Association) Hibernian
3	(Scottish Football Association) Partick Thistle
3	(Swiss Football Association) Grasshopper Club Zürich
3	(Swiss Football Association) Servette
3	(Korea Football Association) ROK Navy FC
3	(Turkish Football Federation) Adalet SK Istanbul
3	(Turkish Football Federation) Karagücü
3	(Football Association of Yugoslavia) Vojvodina Novi Sad
2	(Austrian Football Association) First Vienna FC
2	(Brazilian Football Confederation) Corinthians
2	(Brazilian Football Confederation) Palmeiras
2	(Royal Belgian Football Association) Daring Club
2	(Royal Belgian Football Association) Royal FC Liegeois
2	(Football Association of the Czech Republic) CH Bratislava
2	(Football Association of the Czech Republic) Spartak Praha Sokolovo
2	(The Football Association) Birmingham City
2	(The Football Association) Blackpool
2	(The Football Association) Fulham
2	(The Football Association) Huddersfield Town
2	(French Football Federation) Nice
2	(German Football Association) 1. FC Köln
2	(German Football Association) Hamburger SV
2	(German Football Association) SpVgg Fürth
2	(Hungarian Football Federation) Budapesti Dózsa
2	(Italian Football Federation) Bologna
2	(Italian Football Federation) Milan
2	(Italian Football Federation) Roma
2	(Mexican Football Federation) Atlas
2	(Mexican Football Federation) Guadalajara
2	(Mexican Football Federation) León
2	(Mexican Football Federation) Marte
2	(Scottish Football Association) Aberdeen
2	(Korea Football Association) ROK Armed Forces Military Police Command FC
2	(Korea Football Association) ROK Army Quartermaster Corps FC
2	(Uruguayan Football Association) Danubio
2	(Uruguayan Football Association) Defensor
2	(Football Association of Yugoslavia) Hajduk Split
1	(Austrian Football Association) Linzer ASK
1	(Austrian Football Association) Wiener Sportclub
1	(Royal Belgian Football Association) A.S.V. Oostende K.M.
1	(Royal Belgian Football Association) Berchem Sport
1	(Royal Belgian Football Association) Cercle Sportif Tongrois
1	(Royal Belgian Football Association) Charleroi SC
1	(Royal Belgian Football Association) Lierse
1	(Royal Belgian Football Association) Standard Liège
1	(Royal Belgian Football Association) Union St. Gilloise
1	(Royal Belgian Football Association) White Star
1	(Brazilian Football Confederation) Botafogo
1	(Football Association of the Czech Republic) Baník Handlová
1	(Football Association of the Czech Republic) Baník Kladno
1	(Football Association of the Czech Republic) Iskra Žilina
1	(Football Association of the Czech Republic) Tankista Praha
1	(Football Association of the Czech Republic) Tatran Prešov
1	(The Football Association) Bolton Wanderers
1	(The Football Association) Burnley
1	(The Football Association) Chelsea
1	(The Football Association) Leicester City
1	(The Football Association) Luton Town
1	(The Football Association) Newcastle United
1	(The Football Association) Sheffield United
1	(The Football Association) Sheffield Wednesday
1	(The Football Association) West Ham United
1	(French Football Federation) FC Sochaux
1	(French Football Federation) Girondins de Bordeaux
1	(French Football Federation) Lyon
1	(French Football Federation) Metz
1	(French Football Federation) Monaco
1	(French Football Federation) RC Lens
1	(French Football Federation) RC Strasbourg
1	(French Football Federation) Saint-Étienne
1	(French Football Federation) Toulouse FC
1	(French Football Federation) Troyes
1	(German Football Association) 1. FC Nürnberg
1	(German Football Association) Bayern Munich
1	(German Football Association) BC Augsburg
1	(German Football Association) Borussia Dortmund
1	(German Football Association) Eintracht Frankfurt
1	(German Football Association) FC Schalke 04
1	(German Football Association) FK Pirmasens
1	(German Football Association) Fortuna Düsseldorf
1	(German Football Association) FSV Frankfurt
1	(German Football Association) KSV Hessen Kassel
1	(German Football Association) Rot-Weiss Essen
1	(Hungarian Football Federation) Budapesti Kinizsi
1	(Hungarian Football Federation) Budapesti Vasas SE
1	(Hungarian Football Federation) Csepeli Vasas
1	(Hungarian Football Federation) Dorogi Bányász
1	(Hungarian Football Federation) Győri Vasas SE
1	(Hungarian Football Federation) Salgótarjáni BTC
1	(Italian Football Federation) Sampdoria
1	(Mexican Football Federation) Club América
1	(Mexican Football Federation) Puebla
1	(Mexican Football Federation) Tampico
1	(Mexican Football Federation) Toluca
1	(Mexican Football Federation) Zacatepec
1	(Scottish Football Association) Airdrieonians
1	(Scottish Football Association) Dundee
1	(Scottish Football Association) Queen of the South
1	(Scottish Football Association) Raith Rovers
1	(Swiss Football Association) Basel
1	(Swiss Football Association) Chiasso
1	(Turkish Football Federation) Beşiktaş
1	(Turkish Football Federation) Karagümrük
1	(Turkish Football Federation) Kasımpaşa
1	(Uruguayan Football Association) Rampla Juniors
1	(Football Association of Yugoslavia) Lokomotiva Zagreb
1	(Football Association of Yugoslavia) Radnički Belgrade
1	(Football Association of Yugoslavia) Spartak Subotica

=== Player representation by league system ===
Country	Players	Outside national squad	Clubs
(The Football Association) England	29	7	17
(Austrian Football Association) Austria	22	0	6
(Royal Belgian Football Association) Belgium	22	0	13
(Brazilian Football Confederation) Brazil	22	0	8
(Football Association of the Czech Republic) Czecholovakia	22	0	10
(French Football Federation) France	22	0	13
(German Football Association) Germany	22	0	15
(Hungarian Football Federation) Hungary	22	0	9
(Italian Football Federation) Italy	22	0	7
(Mexican Football Federation) Mexico	22	0	12
(Swiss Football Association) Switzerland	22	0	7
(Turkish Football Federation) Turkey	22	0	7
(Uruguayan Football Association) Uruguay	22	0	5
(Football Association of Yugoslavia) Yugoslavia	22	0	8
(Korea Football Association) South Korea	20	0	6
(Scottish Football Association) Scotland	15	0	8
Total	350	7 (2.00%)	151

- Scotland were the only country to include players playing outside their domestic league, with all seven playing in England.
- South Korea were the only country to not include twenty-two players in their squad, leaving two vacant slots.

=== Coaches representation by country ===
Nº	Country	Coaches
2	Austria	Walter Nausch, Karl Rappan (Switzerland)
2	Hungary	Lajos Czeizler (Italy), Gusztáv Sebes
2	Scotland	Andy Beattie, Doug Livingstone (Belgium)
1	Brazil	Zezé Moreira
1	Czechoslovakia	Karol Borhy
1	England	Walter Winterbottom
1	France	Pierre Pibarot
1	Italy	Sandro Puppo (Turkey)
1	South Korea	Kim Yong-sik
1	Spain	Antonio López Herranz (Mexico)
1	Uruguay	Juan López
1	West Germany	Sepp Herberger
1	(Socialist Federal Republic of Yugoslavia) Yugoslavia	Aleksandar Tirnanić
