= 1954 FIFA World Cup Group 2 =

Football tournament group stage

Group 2 of the 1954 FIFA World Cup took place from 17 to 23 June 1954. The group consisted of Hungary, South Korea, Turkey, and West Germany.

== Standings ==
Pos	Team	Pld	W	D	L	GF	GA	GD	Pts	Qualification
1	Hungary	2	2	0	0	17	3	+14	4	Advance to the knockout stage
2	West Germany	2	1	0	1	7	9	−2	2 (Note: Second place decided over through play-off: West Germany 7–2 Turkey.)	Advance to the knockout stage
3	Turkey	2	1	0	1	8	4	+4	2	
4	South Korea	2	0	0	2	0	16	−16	0	

Source: FIFA

== Matches ==
All times listed are local time (CET, UTC+1).

=== West Germany vs Turkey ===
17 June 1954
18:00

West Germany	4–1	Turkey
Schäfer 14'; Klodt 52'; O. Walter 60'; Morlock 84'		Mamat 2'

Wankdorfstadion, Bern
Attendance: 28,000
Referee: Jose da Costa Vieira (Portugal)

West Germany
Turkey

GK	1	Toni Turek
RB	2	Fritz Laband
LB	3	Werner Kohlmeyer
CH	7	Josef Posipal
RH	6	Horst Eckel
LH	8	Karl Mai
OR	14	Bernhard Klodt
IR	13	Max Morlock
CF	15	Ottmar Walter
IL	16	Fritz Walter (c)
OL	20	Hans Schäfer
Manager:
(West Germany) Sepp Herberger

GK	1	Turgay Şeren (c)
DF	2	Rıdvan Bolatlı
DF	3	Basri Dirimlili
DF	4	Mustafa Ertan
MF	5	Çetin Zeybek
MF	6	Rober Eryol
FW	7	Erol Keskin
FW	8	Suat Mamat
FW	9	Feridun Buğeker
FW	10	Burhan Sargun
FW	11	Lefter Küçükandonyadis
Manager:
(Italy) Sandro Puppo

=== Hungary vs South Korea ===
17 June 1954
18:00

Hungary	9–0	South Korea
Puskás 12', 89'; Lantos 18'; Kocsis 24', 36', 50'; Czibor 59'; Palotás 75', 83'

Hardturm Stadium, Zurich
Attendance: 13,000
Referee: Raymond Vincenti (France)

Hungary
South Korea

GK	1	Gyula Grosics
RB	2	Jenő Buzánszky
CH	3	Gyula Lóránt
LB	4	Mihály Lantos
RH	5	József Bozsik
LH	15	Ferenc Szojka
OR	16	László Budai
IR	8	Sándor Kocsis
SS	19	Péter Palotás
IL	10	Ferenc Puskás (c)
OL	11	Zoltán Czibor
Manager:
(Hungary) Gusztáv Sebes

GK	1	Hong Deok-young
DF	2	Park Kyu-chung
DF	4	Kang Chang-gi
DF	3	Park Jae-seung
MF	6	Min Byung-dae (c)
MF	16	Chu Yung-kwang
MF	11	Chung Nam-sik
FW	17	Park Il-kap
FW	10	Sung Nak-woon
FW	9	Woo Sang-kwon
FW	7	Choi Chung-min
Manager:
(South Korea) Kim Yong-sik

=== Hungary vs West Germany ===
20 June 1954
16:50

Hungary	8–3	West Germany
Kocsis 3', 21', 69', 78'; Puskás 17'; Hidegkuti 52', 54'; J. Tóth 75'		Pfaff 25'; Rahn 77'; Herrmann 84'

St. Jakob Stadium, Basel
Attendance: 56,000
Referee: William Ling (England)

Hungary
West Germany

GK	1	Gyula Grosics
RB	2	Jenő Buzánszky
LB	4	Mihály Lantos
RH	5	József Bozsik
CH	3	Gyula Lóránt
LH	6	József Zakariás
OR	7	József Tóth
IR	8	Sándor Kocsis
SS	9	Nándor Hidegkuti
IL	10	Ferenc Puskás (c)
OL	11	Zoltán Czibor
Manager:
(Hungary) Gusztáv Sebes

GK	22	Heinz Kwiatkowski
RB	4	Hans Bauer
LB	3	Werner Kohlmeyer
CH	7	Josef Posipal
MF	10	Werner Liebrich
MF	9	Paul Mebus
OR	12	Helmut Rahn
IR	6	Horst Eckel
CF	19	Alfred Pfaff
IL	16	Fritz Walter (c)
OL	17	Richard Herrmann
Manager:
(West Germany) Sepp Herberger

=== Turkey vs South Korea ===
20 June 1954
17:00

Turkey	7–0	South Korea
Mamat 10', 30'; Lefter 24'; Sargun 37', 64', 70'; Keskin 76'

Stade des Charmilles, Geneva
Attendance: 4,000
Referee: Esteban Marino (Uruguay)

Turkey
South Korea

GK	1	Turgay Şeren (c)
DF	2	Rıdvan Bolatlı
DF	3	Basri Dirimlili
DF	4	Mustafa Ertan
MF	5	Çetin Zeybek
MF	6	Rober Eryol
FW	7	Erol Keskin
FW	8	Suat Mamat
FW	20	Necmi Onarıcı
FW	11	Lefter Küçükandonyadis
FW	10	Burhan Sargun
Manager:
(Italy) Sandro Puppo

GK	1	Hong Deok-young
DF	2	Park Kyu-chung (c)
DF	14	Han Chang-wha
DF	13	Li Jong-kap
MF	15	Kim Ji-sung
MF	4	Kang Chang-gi
FW	18	Choi Yung-keun
FW	7	Lee Soo-nam
FW	19	Li Ki-joo
FW	9	Woo Sang-kwon
FW	20	Chung Kook-chin
Manager:
(South Korea) Kim Yong-sik

=== Play-off: West Germany vs Turkey ===
23 June 1954
18:00

West Germany	7–2	Turkey
O. Walter 7'; Schäfer 12', 79'; Morlock 30', 60', 77'; F. Walter 62'		Ertan 21'; Lefter 82'

Hardturm Stadium, Zurich
Attendance: 17,000
Referee: Raymond Vincenti (France)

West Germany
Turkey

GK	1	Toni Turek
RB	2	Fritz Laband
LB	4	Hans Bauer
CH	7	Josef Posipal
RH	6	Horst Eckel
LH	8	Karl Mai
OR	14	Bernhard Klodt
IR	13	Max Morlock
CF	15	Ottmar Walter
IL	16	Fritz Walter (c)
OL	20	Hans Schäfer
Manager:
(West Germany) Sepp Herberger

GK	12	Şükrü Ersoy
DF	2	Rıdvan Bolatlı
DF	3	Basri Dirimlili
DF	17	Naci Erdem
MF	5	Çetin Zeybek
MF	6	Rober Eryol
FW	7	Erol Keskin
FW	11	Lefter Küçükandonyadis (c)
FW	20	Necmi Onarıcı
FW	4	Mustafa Ertan
FW	22	Coşkun Taş
Manager:
(Italy) Sandro Puppo

== See also ==
- Germany at the FIFA World Cup
- Hungary at the FIFA World Cup
- South Korea at the FIFA World Cup
- Turkey at the FIFA World Cup
