= 1954 FIFA World Cup Group 1 =

Football tournament group stage

Group 1 of the 1954 FIFA World Cup took place from 16 to 19 June 1954. The group consisted of Brazil, France, Mexico, and Yugoslavia.

== Standings ==
| Pos | Team | Pld | W | D | L | GF | GA | GD | Pts | Qualification |
|---|---|---|---|---|---|---|---|---|---|---|
| 1 | Brazil | 2 | 1 | 1 | 0 | 6 | 1 | +5 | 3 | Advance to the knockout stage |
| 1 | Yugoslavia | 2 | 1 | 1 | 0 | 2 | 1 | +1 | 3 | Advance to the knockout stage |
| 3 | France | 2 | 1 | 0 | 1 | 3 | 3 | 0 | 2 | |
| 4 | Mexico | 2 | 0 | 0 | 2 | 2 | 8 | −6 | 0 | |

Source: FIFA

== Matches ==
All times listed are local time (CET, UTC+1).

=== Brazil vs Mexico ===
16 June 1954
18:00

| Brazil | 5–0 | Mexico |
|---|---|---|
| Baltazar 23'; Didi 30'; Pinga 34', 43'; Julinho 69' |

Stade des Charmilles, Geneva
Attendance: 13,470
Referee: Raymon Wyssling (Switzerland)

Brazil
Mexico

| GK | 1 | Castilho |
| RB | 2 | Djalma Santos |
| CH | 5 | Pinheiro |
| LB | 3 | Nílton Santos |
| RH | 4 | Brandãozinho |
| LH | 6 | Bauer (c) |
| OR | 7 | Julinho |
| IR | 8 | Didi |
| CF | 9 | Baltazar |
| IL | 10 | Pinga |
| OL | 11 | Rodrigues |
Manager:
(Brazil) Zezé Moreira

| GK | 12 | Salvador Mota |
| DF | 2 | Narciso López |
| DF | 3 | Jorge Romo |
| DF | 14 | Juan Gómez |
| MF | 5 | Raúl Cárdenas |
| MF | 6 | Rafael Ávalos |
| FW | 7 | Alfredo Torres |
| FW | 8 | José Naranjo (c) |
| FW | 9 | José Luis Lamadrid |
| FW | 10 | Tomás Balcázar |
| FW | 11 | Raúl Arellano |
Manager:
(Spain) Antonio López Herranz

=== Yugoslavia vs France ===
16 June 1954
18:00

| Yugoslavia | 1–0 | France |
|---|---|---|
| Milutinović 15' |

Stade Olympique de la Pontaise, Lausanne
Attendance: 16,000
Referee: Benjamin Griffiths (Wales)

Yugoslavia
France

| GK | 1 | Vladimir Beara |
| RB | 2 | Branko Stanković |
| CH | 5 | Ivica Horvat |
| LB | 3 | Tomislav Crnković |
| RH | 4 | Zlatko Čajkovski |
| LH | 6 | Vujadin Boškov |
| FW | 18 | Miloš Milutinović |
| IF | 8 | Rajko Mitić |
| CF | 9 | Bernard Vukas |
| IF | 10 | Stjepan Bobek (c) |
| FW | 11 | Branko Zebec |
Manager:
(Socialist Federal Republic of Yugoslavia) Aleksandar Tirnanić

| GK | 1 | François Remetter |
| RB | 4 | Lazare Gianessi |
| CH | 10 | Robert Jonquet (c) |
| LB | 6 | Raymond Kaelbel |
| RH | 12 | Jean-Jacques Marcel |
| LH | 14 | Armand Penverne |
| FW | 16 | René Dereuddre |
| FW | 17 | Léon Glovacki |
| SS | 18 | Raymond Kopa |
| FW | 21 | André Strappe |
| OL | 22 | Jean Vincent |
Manager:
(France) Pierre Pibarot

=== Brazil vs Yugoslavia ===
19 June 1954
17:00

| Brazil | 1–1 (a.e.t.) | Yugoslavia |
|---|---|---|
| Didi 69' | | Zebec 48' |

Stade Olympique de la Pontaise, Lausanne
Attendance: 24,637
Referee: Charlie Faultless (Scotland)

Brazil
Yugoslavia

| GK | 1 | Castilho |
| RB | 2 | Djalma Santos |
| CH | 5 | Pinheiro |
| LB | 3 | Nílton Santos |
| RH | 4 | Brandãozinho |
| LH | 6 | Bauer (c) |
| OR | 7 | Julinho |
| IR | 8 | Didi |
| CF | 9 | Baltazar |
| IL | 10 | Pinga |
| OL | 11 | Rodrigues |
Manager:
(Brazil) Zezé Moreira

| GK | 1 | Vladimir Beara |
| RB | 2 | Branko Stanković |
| CH | 5 | Ivica Horvat |
| LB | 3 | Tomislav Crnković |
| RH | 4 | Zlatko Čajkovski |
| LH | 6 | Vujadin Boškov |
| FW | 18 | Miloš Milutinović |
| IF | 8 | Rajko Mitić (c) |
| CF | 9 | Bernard Vukas |
| IF | 20 | Dionizije Dvornić |
| FW | 11 | Branko Zebec |
Manager:
(Socialist Federal Republic of Yugoslavia) Aleksandar Tirnanić

=== France vs Mexico ===
19 June 1954
17:10

| France | 3–2 | Mexico |
|---|---|---|
| Vincent 19'; Cárdenas 46' (o.g.); Kopa 88' (pen.) | | Lamadrid 54'; Balcázar 85' |

Stade des Charmilles, Geneva
Attendance: 19,000
Referee: Manuel Asensi (Spain)

France
Mexico

| GK | 1 | François Remetter |
| DF | 4 | Lazare Gianessi |
| DF | 6 | Raymond Kaelbel |
| LB | 7 | Roger Marche (c) |
| MF | 12 | Jean-Jacques Marcel |
| MF | 13 | Abderrahmane Mahjoub |
| FW | 15 | Abdelaziz Ben Tifour |
| FW | 16 | René Dereuddre |
| FW | 18 | Raymond Kopa |
| FW | 21 | André Strappe |
| OL | 22 | Jean Vincent |
Manager:
(France) Pierre Pibarot

| GK | 1 | Antonio Carbajal |
| DF | 2 | Narciso López |
| DF | 3 | Jorge Romo |
| DF | 4 | Saturnino Martínez |
| MF | 5 | Raúl Cárdenas |
| MF | 6 | Rafael Ávalos |
| FW | 7 | Alfredo Torres |
| FW | 8 | José Naranjo (c) |
| FW | 9 | José Luis Lamadrid |
| FW | 10 | Tomás Balcázar |
| FW | 11 | Raúl Arellano |
Manager:
(Spain) Antonio López Herranz

== See also ==
- Brazil at the FIFA World Cup
- France at the FIFA World Cup
- Mexico at the FIFA World Cup
- Yugoslavia at the FIFA World Cup
