= Van Hoyweghen =

Van Hoyweghen is a surname. Notable people with the surname include:

- David Van Hoyweghen (born 1976), Belgian footballer
- Luc Van Hoyweghen (1929–2013), Belgian footballer
