= Lee Sang-yi =

Lee Sang-yi may refer to:

- Lee Sang-yi (footballer)
- Lee Sang-yi (actor)
