= Backaert =

Backaert is a surname. Notable people with the surname include:

- Frederik Backaert (born 1990), Belgian cyclist
- Jo Backaert (1921–1997), Belgian footballer
