= Frosio =

Frosio is a surname. Notable people with the surname include:

- Cinzia Frosio, Italian figure skater
- Elia Frosio (1913–2005), Italian cyclist
- Ivo Frosio (1930–2019), Swiss footballer
- Pierluigi Frosio (1948–2022), Italian football player and manager
