= Vilém Lugr =

Czech footballer and manager (1911–1994)

Personal information
- Date of birth: 28 June 1911
- Place of birth: Poděbrady, Austria-Hungary
- Date of death: 17 August 1994 (aged 83)
- Place of death: Norrköping, Sweden
- Position: Defender

Senior career*
Years	Team	Apps	(Gls)
1934–1937	Prostějov		
1938–1939	Slezská Ostrava		
1939–1941	Prostějov		

Managerial career
- 1954: Křídla vlasti Olomouc
- 1957–1958: Lech Poznań
- 1959: Śląsk Wrocław
- 1960: Górnik Zabrze
- 1961–1962: Jönköpings Södra
- 1963–1964: IFK Norrköping (coach)
- 1967: Nyköpings BIS
- * Club domestic league appearances and goals

Vilém Lugr (28 June 1911 – 17 August 1994) was a Czech football manager and player.

== Playing career ==
As a player, Lugr made 99 appearances in the Czechoslovak First League, turning out for Prostějov and Slezská Ostrava between 1934 and 1941.

== Coaching career ==
After World War II, Lugr was manager of Křídla vlasti Olomouc in the Czechoslovak First League, in 1954. He went on to manage Polish clubs Lech Poznań, Śląsk Wrocław, and Górnik Zabrze. After moving to Sweden he managed Jönköpings Södra IF in 1961 and 1962, leading the club to finishes of third and eighth in Division 2. Between 1963 and 1964, he was coach for IFK Norrköping who won the Allsvenskan in 1963. In autumn 1967, he joined Nyköpings BIS as head coach.
