= Hüsamettin Böke =

Turkish footballer and referee

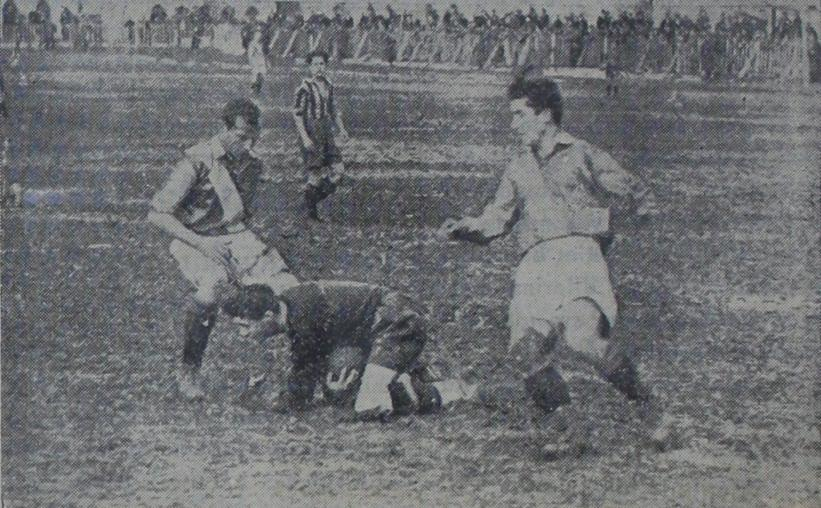
- Böke (centre) during a game against Galatasaray on 23 February 1934

Personal information
- Date of birth: 10 April 1910
- Place of birth: Istanbul, Ottoman Empire
- Date of death: 26 December 1995 (aged 85)
- Place of death: Istanbul, Turkey
- Position: Goalkeeper

Senior career*
Years	Team	Apps	(Gls)
1924–1932	Vefa SK		
1932–1940	Fenerbahçe		
1940–1942	Vefa SK	11	(0)

International career
1926–1932	Turkey	3	(0)
- * Club domestic league appearances and goals

Hüsamettin Böke (10 April 1910 — 26 December 1995) was a Turkish footballer and referee, who played as a goalkeeper.

== Club career ==
Böke began his career at Vefa SK, playing for the club for seven seasons. 1932, Böke joined Fenerbahçe. On 24 February 1934, during a match against rivals Galatasaray at the Taksim Stadium, Böke was involved in a fight causing the abandonment of the game. The February 1934 clash is widely regarded as the spark of the present day rivalry. During his time at Fenerbahçe, Böke started in the 1933 Turkish Football Championship final, keeping a clean sheet in an 8–0 win against İzmirspor. In 1935, Böke started in a 3–1 final win against Altınordu. For the final two seasons of his career, Böke returned to Vefa, making 11 appearances.

== International career ==
On 7 May 1926, Böke made his debut for Turkey in a 3–1 loss against Romania.

== Post-playing career ==
Following his retirement from football, Böke became a referee. Böke was first listed as an assistant referee in 1951 and became a referee in 1957.
