= Hilmi Kiremitçi =

Turkish footballer (1934–2011)

Hilmi Kiremitçi (1934 – 20 July 2011) was a Turkish football player and manager. He is one of the former football players of Vefa and Fenerbahçe.

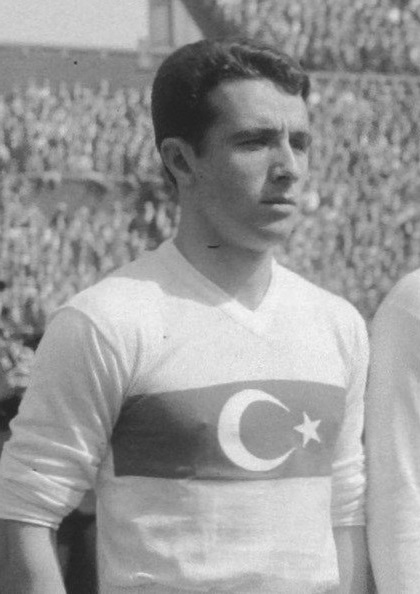
Hilmi Kiremitci

== Club career ==
Kiremitçi was born in 1934 in Plovdiv, a city with a large Turkish minority in Bulgaria, and immigrated to, Turkey, with his mother as a child. There, in 1949, he began playing football in the youth academy of Vefa, a popular team at the time. He then began playing amateur football for Davutpaşa.

He turned professional by transferring to İstanbulspor. He quickly attracted attention there, and in 1956, he was transferred to his former team, Vefa, a prominent team in the Istanbul Professional League. Becoming a star on this team, Kiremitçi made his debut for the A national team jersey on 5 April 1957, in a 4–0 victory against the Egypt in the Mediterranean Cup.

In 1960, he transferred to Fenerbahçe. He was part of Fenerbahçe's championship-winning squad in 1960–61.

He earned 13 caps for the senior national team, four of which were for Fenerbahçe, and one cap for the senior national team.

Kiremitçi left Fenerbahçe in the 1963 transfer season and returned to his former club, Vefa. He continued his career as a player and coach for this team, and then at Sivasspor. He retired from football in 1968 and began his coaching career.

== International career ==
Kiremitçi won a total of 14 caps for Turkey senior national teams, including one for the Turkey B national team and 13 for the Turkey A national team, scoring one goal in each match.

== Coaching career ==
Kiremitçi's greatest achievement in his coaching career was the 1978–79 season, when he coached Orduspor, finishing 4th in the First League and competing in European competitions for the first time the following season. His other significant achievement was leading Samsunspor to the First League in the 1981–82 season. He also coached Sivasspor, Vefa (1971–74), Bandırmaspor (1974–75), Vefa again (1980–81), Davutpaşa (1981–82), Beykoz (1982–83), Vefa again (1985–87), and Bandırmaspor again (1987–88).

== Later life and death ==
Kiremitçi was diagnosed with lung cancer in 2005 and fought for life for a long time. He was taken to Bandırma State Hospital in Bandırma, where he lived on 10 July 2011, and died on the night of 19 to 20 July. His funeral was held on 20 July 2011, after the noon prayer at the Kethuda Çarşı Mosque, and he was laid to rest in the Erdek district of Balıkesir, where he lived until his final resting place.
