= Galip Haktanır =

Turkish footballer (1921–2023)

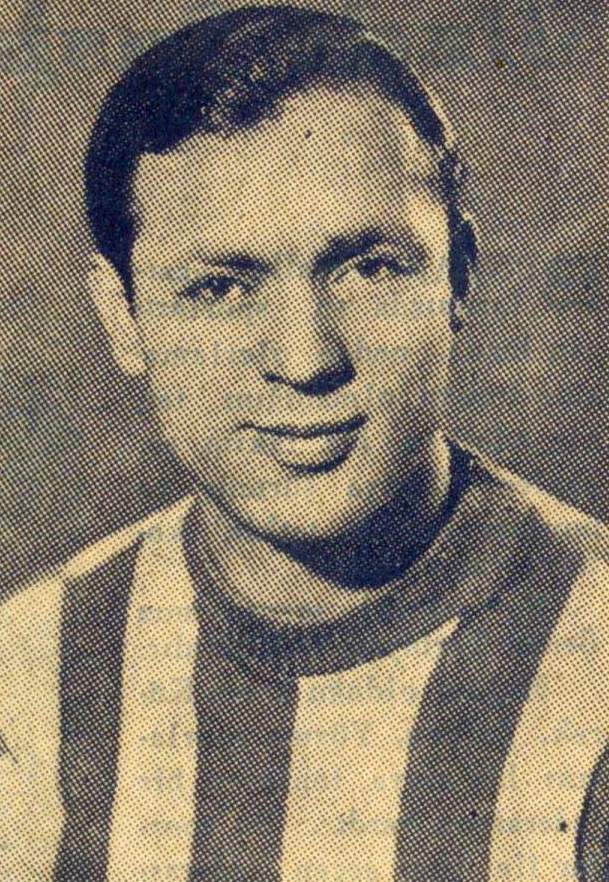
- Haktanır in 1947

Personal information
- Date of birth: 1 August 1921
- Place of birth: İznik, Ottoman Empire
- Date of death: 30 September 2023 (aged 102)
- Position: Defender

Senior career*
Years	Team	Apps	(Gls)
1938–1954	Vefaspor		

International career
1948–1950	Turkey	5	(0)
- * Club domestic league appearances and goals

Galip Haktanır (1 August 1921 – 30 September 2023) was a Turkish footballer. He died on 30 September 2023, at the age of 102.

== Club career ==
Nicknamed Kör Galip (Blind Winner), Galip played his entire, 16-year career for Vefaspor.

== International career ==
Haktanır made his debut for the Turkey national team in a May 1948 friendly match against Austria and played in five matches from 1948 to 1950. He was also part of Turkey's squad for the football tournament at the 1948 Summer Olympics, but he did not play in any matches.

His final international was an October 1950 friendly match away against Israel. At the time of his death, he was the eldest surviving national team player.
