= Julio Maceiras =

Uruguayan footballer (1926–2011)

Personal information
- Full name: Julio Maceiras Fauque
- Date of birth: 22 April 1926
- Place of birth: Uruguay
- Date of death: 6 September 2011 (aged 85)
- Position: Goalkeeper

Senior career*
Years	Team	Apps	(Gls)
- Danubio F.C.

International career
1954–1956	Uruguay	8	(0)
Medal record
Men's football
Representing Uruguay
South American Championship
Winner	1956 Uruguay
- * Club domestic league appearances and goals

Julio Maceiras Fauque (22 April 1926 - 6 September 2011) was a Uruguayan football goalkeeper who played for Uruguay in the 1954 FIFA World Cup. He also played for Danubio F.C.

== Career statistics ==
=== International ===
National team	Year	Apps	Goals
Uruguay	1954	1	0
Uruguay	1955	0	0
Uruguay	1956	7	0
Total		8	0
