= Géza Gulyás =

Hungarian footballer

Personal information
- Full name: Géza Gulyás
- Date of birth: 5 June 1931
- Place of birth: Budapest, Hungary
- Date of death: 14 August 2014 (aged 83)
- Position: Goalkeeper

Senior career*
Years	Team	Apps	(Gls)
1952–1958	Ferencvárosi TC	131	(0)
Medal record
Representing Hungary
FIFA World Cup
Runner-up	1954 Switzerland
- * Club domestic league appearances and goals

Géza Gulyás (5 June 1931 – 14 August 2014), was a Hungarian football goalkeeper who was a member of the Hungary national team at the 1954 FIFA World Cup. However, he was never capped for his country. He also played for Ferencvárosi Torna Club.
