= Vefa S.K. =

Vefa SK
- Full name: Vefa Spor Kulübü
- Nickname: Genç Keçiler (Young Goats)
- Founded: 1908; 118 years ago
- Ground: Vefa Stadium, Istanbul, Turkey
- Capacity: 6,500
- Chairman: (Turkey) Mesut Gülbaran
- Manager: (Turkey) Adnan Keskin
- League: Turkish Regional Amateur League
- 2022-23: Turkish Regional Amateur League, Group 11, 8th
Home colours	Away colours	Third colours

Vefa SK is a football club in Vefa, neighborhood of the Fatih (Eminönü between 1928 and 2008) district of Istanbul. The team currently competing at Bölgesel Amatör Lig 1st Group which is 5th level of Turkish leagues. Vefa SK is the first and only Turkish club coached by a female manager, Özgür Gözüaçık Akyıldız.

== History ==
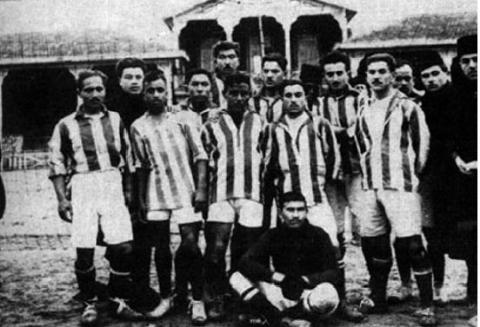
Vefa SK in 1919

The club was founded in 1908 when Turkish football was legalized. The club was formed by the students from Vefa Idadisi (Vefa College), Saim Turgut Aktansel, Zeki (Baban), Hikmet (Barlan), Rıfat (Baban), Sudi Cavit (Oral), Tevfik (Kut), Yusuf Ziya and Sabri Beyler as Vefa Idman Yurdu. Following foundation of the Republic of Turkey, club's name change into Vefa Spor Klubu (Vefa Sport Club).

They played in the Istanbul League until the establishment of the Süper Lig in 1959, for which they qualified. Vefa were relegated to the Second League (2. Lig) first time in 1962–63. They became the champions of the second league in 1964–65. They were relegated again in 1973–74. They stayed in the second league until 1986–87 season. They were relegated from 3rd division to amateur league in 1993–94. They played in the third league in 1998–99 and 1999–2000 seasons. Today they play in the amateur leagues. Their ground is the 6,000 capacity Vefa Stadı. Vefa finished Istanbul 4th Group of Super Amateur as champions and qualified to play-offs for Regional Amateur League. They finished it as 6th and qualified to Regional Amateur League play-outs. They faced with Bayrampaşa Tunaspor on 6 May 2012 and won as 3–1. Consequently, they promoted to Regional Amateur League (RAL) for 2012–13 season. They finished 9rd group of RAL as 2nd and didn't qualify to promotion play-off. They finished 11th group of RAL as 8th, but they relegated to Istanbul Super Amateur due to Vefa finished below Dikilitaş, which was another Istanbul team according to RAL rules in 2013–14 season. Vefaspor finished 1st Group of Istanbul Super Amateur League as 1st and qualified to promotion play-offs in 2014–15 season. Vefaspor finished play-offs as 3rd and returned to RAL immediately.

The club's colours are green and white.

=== Professional League history ===
They played in total 14 seasons in the top Turkish league.

The first ever national professional Turkish league (called Milli Lig – National League) started in 1959. Vefa was one of the founder member of Turkish Professional League. In 1959 Turkish Professional League was played in two stages – the Groups and the Final. The winners of each group qualified to the second stage. Vefa was placed in Group Red. They just missed the final, coming second after Galatasaray.

Turkish Professional League in 1959.

- Group Red:
- 1 Galatasaray A.Ş. 20 14 7 6 1 18 7 (Proceeds to Final)
- 2 Vefa 20 14 7 6 1 21 10
- 3 Ankara Demirspor 16 14 4 8 2 12 11
- 4 Göztepe 15 14 5 5 4 23 21
- 5 Fatih Karagümrük 12 14 4 4 6 17 17
- 6 Karşıyaka S.K. 10 14 2 6 6 13 21
- 7 Gençlerbirliği S.K. 10 14 1 8 5 10 18
- 8 Adalet 9 14 1 7 6 12 21

Adalet formed in 1946 as Adalet Gençlik Kulübü, and become Alibeyköy Adalet SK in 1971, then become Alibeyköy in 1980.

- Group White:
- 1 Fenerbahçe S.K. 26 14 12 2 0 29 7 Proceeds to Final
- 2 Beşiktaş J.K. 18 14 8 2 4 22 16
- 3 Altay S.K. 15 14 5 5 4 18 16
- 4 İzmirspor G.S.K. 13 14 4 5 5 11 12
- 5 M.K.E. Ankaragücü 13 14 5 3 6 16 19
- 6 Hacettepe S.K. 11 14 5 1 8 14 20
- 7 Beykoz 1908 S.K.D. 10 14 3 4 7 17 21
- 8 İstanbul S.A.Ş. 6 14 1 4 9 6 22
- Final: Fenerbahçe S.K. – Galatasaray A.Ş. (0–1), (4–0)

Vefa SK's all participations in the Turkish Professional League (Süper Lig) as follows;

- 1959: 2nd in the Group Red, P: 20, G: 14, W: 7, D: 6, L: 1, F: 21, A: 10.
- 1959–60: 11th place, P: 335, G: 38, W: 11, D: 13, L: 14, F: 37, A: 60.
- 1960–61: 6th place, P: 41, G: 38, W: 13, D: 15, L: 10, F: 32, A: 39.
- 1961–62: 18th place, P: 31, G: 38, W: 11, D: 9, L: 18, F: 29, A: 48.
- 1962–63: 10th place in the Group White, P: 13, G: 20, W: 3, D: 7, L: 10, F: 22, A: 37, Relegated to Turkish Second Division.
- 1965–66: 11th place, P: 27, G: 30, W: 9, D: 9, L: 12, F: 26, A: 36.
- 1966–67: 13th place, P: 29, G: 32, W: 9, D: 11, L: 12, F: 31, A: 35.
- 1967–68: 12th place, P: 29, G: 32, W: 8, D: 13, L: 11, F: 31, A: 35.
- 1968–69: 13th place, P: 24, G: 30, W: 8, D: 8, L: 14, F: 27, A: 37.
- 1969–70: 13th place, P: 25, G: 30, W: 7, D: 11, L: 12, F: 19, A: 28.
- 1970–71: 14th place, P: 22, G: 30, W: 4, D: 14, L: 12, F: 28, A: 48.
- 1971–72: 10th place, P: 28, G: 30, W: 9, D: 10, L: 11, F: 23, A: 27.
- 1972–73: 14th place, P: 22, G: 30, W: 6, D: 10, L: 14, F: 22, A: 35.
- 1973–74: 16th place, P: 17, G: 30, W: 5, D: 7, L: 18, F: 16, A: 39. (Relegated to Turkish Second Division)

Vefa SK's Turkish Second Division (currently known as TFF 1. League) History;

- 1963–64: Second League 4th
- 1964–65: Second League 1st (Promoted to First (Now Turkey Super League)
- 1974–75: Second Division Group Red 15th.
- 1975–76: Second Division Group White 5th.
- 1976–77: Second Division Group White 8th.
- 1977–78: Second Division Group White 8th.
- 1978–79: Second Division Group White 4th.
- 1979–80: Second Division Group B 6th.
- 1980–81: Second Division Group B 9th.
- 1981–82: Second Division Group A 5th.
- 1982–83: Second Division Group A 8th.
- 1983–84: Second Division Group B 5th.
- 1984–85: Second Division Group C 8th.
- 1985–86: Second Division Group C 8th.
- 1986–87: Second Division Group C 16th. (Relegated to Turkish Third Division)

== Current squad ==
As of 21 September 2015. Source

Note: Flags indicate national team as defined under FIFA eligibility rules; some limited exceptions apply. Players may hold more than one non-FIFA nationality.

No.	Pos.	Nation	Player
1	GK	TUR	Özgür Solak (vice captain)
12	GK	TUR	Anıl Tezcan
—	GK	TUR	Mehmet Kırmızıtaş
2	DF	TUR	Emin Çelik
3	DF	TUR	Muhammed Emin Yamağ
5	DF	TUR	Sarper Salih Ağca
4	DF	TUR	Muhammed Çetin Polat
—	DF	TUR	Burak Uğur
18	DF	TUR	Şakir Örs
6	MF	TUR	Mehmet Yılmaz
16	MF	TUR	Emin Soğuk

No.	Pos.	Nation	Player
14	MF	TUR	Yunusay Topçu
10	MF	TUR	Fırat Işık (captain)
7	MF	TUR	Tunç Yalçın
11	MF	TUR	Yasin Sakaloğlu
—	MF	TUR	Doğuş Cen Kazan
8	MF	TUR	Samet Bektaş
—	MF	TUR	Hüseyin Kaya
17	MF	TUR	Yasin Tunçeli
15	FW	TUR	Hilmi Can Ercan
13	FW	TUR	Gökhan Öztürk
9	FW	TUR	Sefa Turan

== Notable players ==
- (Turkey) Galip Haktanır
- (Turkey) İsmet Yamanoğlu
- (Turkey) Garbis İstanbulluoğlu
- (Turkey) Hilmi Kiremitçi
- (Turkey) Saffet Sancaklı
- (Turkey) Abdullah Avcı
- (Turkey) Niko Kovi
- (Turkey) Rahmi Denizöz
- (Turkey) Arif Dökel
- (Turkey) Turhan Akra
- (Turkey) Candemir Berkman
- (Turkey) Necmi Onarıcı
- (Turkey) Ahmet Berman
- (Turkey) Vedat Uysal
- (Turkey) Özcan Arkoç
- (Turkey) İsfendiyar Açıksöz
- (Turkey) Ali Filibeli
- (Turkey) Aydın Tuna
- (Turkey) Salim Görür
- (Turkey) Suat Mamat
- (Turkey) Şükrü Ersoy
- (Turkey) Metin Türel
- (Turkey) Sulhi Garan
- (Turkey) Ümit İnal
- (Turkey) İsmail Kurt
- (Turkey) Aziz Esel
- (Turkey) Erol Togay
- (Turkey) Enver Katip
- (Turkey) Hüsamettin Böke
- (Socialist Federal Republic of Yugoslavia) Bozidar Radulovic
- (Socialist Federal Republic of Yugoslavia) Jovan Savic
- (Argentina) Jorge Montemarani
- (Turkey) Bekir Psav
- (Turkey) Fikri Beşiroğlu
- (Turkey) Muhteşem Kural
- (Turkey) Nejat Küçüksorgunlu
- (Turkey) Abdülmetin Kocaoğlu
- (Turkey) Zeki Temizer
- (Turkey) Haydar Boraganlı
- (Turkey) Uzun Hakkı
- (Turkey) Selahattin Pural
- (Turkey) Güray Erdener
- (Turkey) Doğan Sel
- (Turkey) Çetin Noyan
- (Turkey) Hidayet Öztekin
- (Turkey) Ertuğrul Atilla
- (Turkey) Erdinç Sandalcı
- (Turkey) Ömer Güvenç

== Notable supporters ==
- Cinema: Kemal Sunal, Şener Şen, Müjdat Gezen, Gazanfer Özcan, Erol Büyükburç, Yusuf Kurçenli, Memduh Ün.
- Media: Uğur Dündar, İslam Çupi, Sadettin Teksoy, Tuncay Pınarbaşı
- Writers: Mehmet Akif Ersoy, Yahya Kemal Beyatlı, Peyami Safa, Prof. Dr. İsmail Hakkı Baltacıoğlu, Prof. Dr. M. Şekip Tunç, Yusuf Ziya Ortaç, Adnan Adıvar, Ahmet Altan, Turan Oflazoğlu, Şevket Rado.

== National players ==
Vefa SK players capped for Turkey national Football Team whilst playing for Vefa SK:

- Sami Açıköney: 4 caps (Poland 1–2, Poland 1–6, Bulgaria 1–5, Yugoslavia 2–0)
- Hüsamettin Böke: 2 caps (Romania 1–3, Yugoslavia 2–0)
- Hayri Ragıp Candemir: 2 caps (Romania 1–3, Poland 1–6)
- Hüseyin Saygun: 4 caps (Greece 3–1, Austria 0–1, China 4–0, Yugoslavia 1–3)
- Galip Haktanır: 5 caps (Austria 0–1, Greece 2–1, Austria 0–1, Iran 6–1, Israel 1–5)
- Melih Ilgaz: 1 cap (Iran 6–1)
- Bülent Varol: 1 cap (Iran 6–1)
- Şükrü Ersoy (goalkeeper): 1 cap (Israel 1–5)
- İsmet Yamanoğlu: 5 caps (Sweden 1–3, Switzerland 1–5, Spain 0–0, Switzerland 2–1, Yugoslavia 2–2)
- Garbis İstanbulluoğlu: 5 caps (Switzerland 1–5, Spain 0–0, Switzerland 2–1, Yugoslavia 2–2, Italy B 0–1)
- Nejat Küçüksorgunlu: 2 caps (Egypt 4–0, Poland 1–0,
- Hilmi Kiremitçi: 10 caps (Egypt 4–0, Poland 1–0, Spain 0–3, Belgium 1–1, Holland 2–1, Belgium 1–1, Romania 0–3, Romania 2–0, Holland 0–0, Bulgaria 1–2)

Vefa SK players scored for Turkey National Football Team whilst playing for Vefa SK;

- Hüseyin Saygun: 1 goal (China 4–0)
- Garbis İstanbulluoğlu: 3 goals (Switzerland 1–5, Switzerland 2–1 (2 goals))
- Hilmi Kiremitçi: 1 goal (Egypt 4–0)

Note:

- Sami Açıköney is first Vefa SK player represented Turkey National Football team on 2 October 1925 in İstanbul against Poland.
- Garbis İstanbulluoğlu is the first Vefa SK player scored for Turkey National Football Team.
- Garbis İstanbulluoğlu first capped on 1 June 1952 in Ankara against Switzerland, scored in his debut.
- Garbis İstanbulluoğlu is also the first Christian player represented Turkey National Football Team.
- Hilmi Kiremitçi also scored in his debut for Turkey against Egypt on 5 April 1957 in Al-Qairah during Mediterranean Games. He is the last Vefa SK player represented Turkey as a Vefa SK player on 27 November 1960 in Sofija against Bulgaria. He then moved to Fenerbahçe S.K.

== League participations ==
- Süper Lig: 14

1959–1963, 1965–1974

- TFF First League: 15

1963–1965, 1974–1987

- TFF Second League: 9

1987–1994, 1998–2000

- Turkish Regional Amateur League: 3

2012–2014, 2015–16

- Istanbul Amateur League: 17

1994–1998, 2000–2012, 2014–15

== See also ==
- List of Turkish Sports Clubs by Foundation Dates
