= Alfred Teinitzer =

Austrian footballer (1929–2021)

Personal information
- Date of birth: 29 July 1929
- Place of birth: Vienna, Austria
- Date of death: 20 April 2021 (aged 91)
- Position: Midfielder

Senior career*
Years	Team	Apps	(Gls)
	Rapid Wien	11	(7)
- LASK

International career
- Austria
Medal record
Representing Austria
FIFA World Cup
Third place	1954 Switzerland
- * Club domestic league appearances and goals

Alfred Teinitzer (29 July 1929 – 20 April 2021) was a midfielder who played for Austria in the 1954 FIFA World Cup. He also played for LASK. Teinitzer was the last surviving member of Austria's 1954 World Cup squad.
