= Raymond Ausloos =

Belgian footballer

Personal information
- Date of birth: 3 February 1930
- Place of birth: Etterbeek, Belgium
- Date of death: 1 December 2012 (aged 82)
- Position: Goalkeeper

Senior career*
Years	Team	Apps	(Gls)
- R. White Daring Molenbeek
- * Club domestic league appearances and goals

Raymond Ausloos (3 February 1930 – 1 December 2012) was a Belgian football goalkeeper who was a member of the Belgium national team at the 1954 FIFA World Cup. However, he never earned a cap for Belgium. He also played for R. White Daring Molenbeek.
