= Charmilles Stadium =

Multi-purpose stadium in Geneva, Switzerland

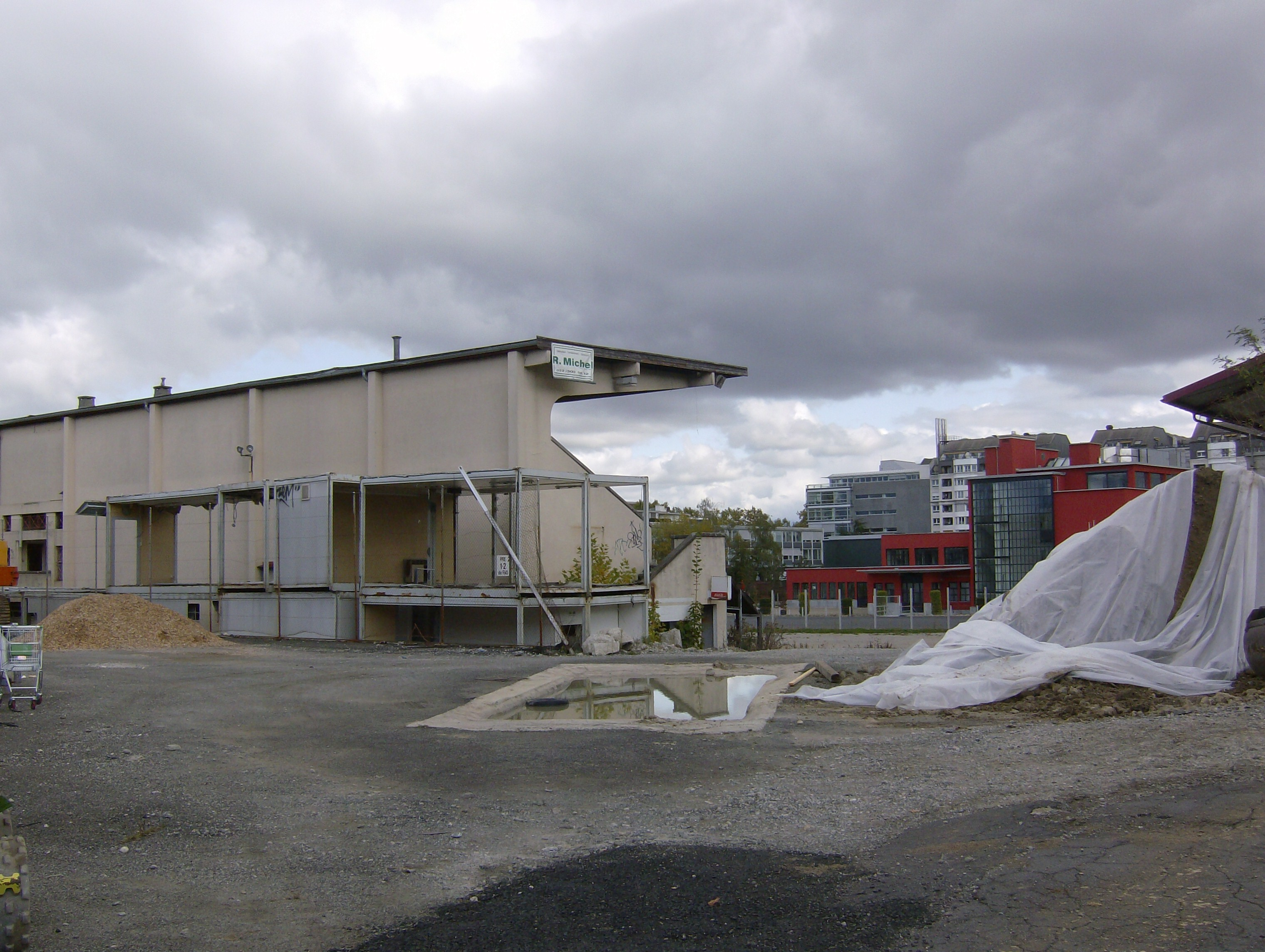
- Interactive map of Charmilles Stadium
- Full name: Stade des Charmilles
- Location: Geneva, Switzerland
- Coordinates: 46.2091°N 6.1182°E
- Capacity: 9,250 (2002)
- Record attendance: 27,000 (1962)

Construction
- Opened: June 1930
- Closed: 2002
- Demolished: 2012

Tenant
- Servette FC

Charmilles Stadium was a multi-purpose stadium in Geneva, Switzerland. It was used mostly for football matches, and was the home venue for Servette FC. The stadium was able to hold 9,250 people and was built in 1930 for the Coupe des Nations 1930 tournament. During the 1954 FIFA World Cup the stadium hosted four games. It was closed in 2002 before Stade de Genève opened.

== Major sports matches ==
=== 1954 FIFA World Cup ===
Date	Time (CET)	Team 1	Result	Team 2	Round	Attendance
16 June 1954	18:00	Brazil	5–0	Mexico	Group 1	13,470
19 June 1954	17:10	France	3–2	Mexico	Group 1	19,000
20 June 1954	17:00	Turkey	7–0	South Korea	Group 2	3,541
27 June 1954	17:00	West Germany	2–0	Yugoslavia	Quarter-finals	17,000
