= Football in Czechoslovakia =

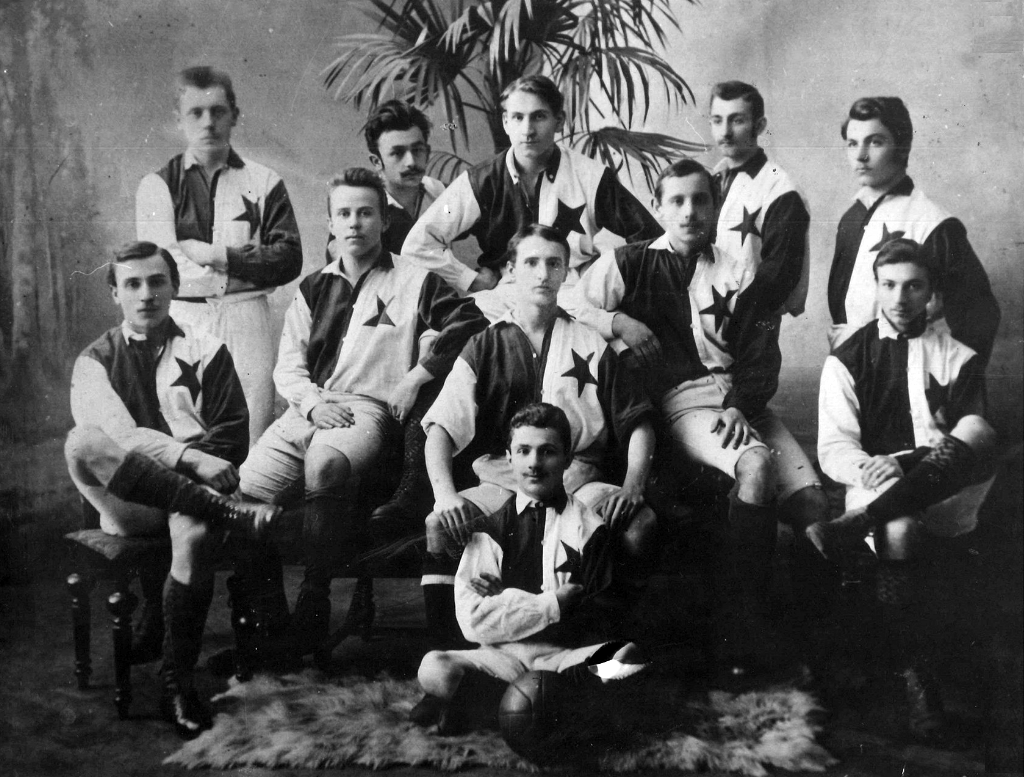
- Slavia Prague in 1901
- Country: Czechoslovakia
- Governing body: Czechoslovak Football Association
- National team: Czechoslovakia national football team

National competitions
- Czechoslovak Cup

Club competitions
- Czechoslovak First League

International competitions
- Champions League; Europa League; Super Cup; FIFA Club World Cup; FIFA World Cup (national team); UEFA European Championship (national team)

Football in Czechoslovakia was one of the most popular sports during that nation's existence, and continues to be popular in both of the nations that followed, the Czech Republic and in Slovakia.

== History ==
On 26 March 1922, the Czechoslovak Football Federation (Československá associace footballová) was founded. It consisted of the Czechoslovak Football Association (Československý svaz footballový), the German Football Association, the Hungarian Football Association, the Jewish Confederation and the Polish Association. On 20 May 1923, the Czechoslovak Football Federation was admitted to FIFA.

== Domestic football ==
Level	League(s)/Division(s)						
1	Czechoslovak First League; 16 clubs						
2	Česká národní fotbalová liga 16 clubs					Slovenská národná futbalová liga 16 clubs	
3	ČFL; 18 clubs			MSFL; 16 clubs		2. SNFL East; 16 clubs	2. SNFL West; 16 clubs
4	Divize A 16 clubs	Divize B 16 clubs	Divize C 16 clubs	Divize D 16 clubs	Divize E 16 clubs		

== National team ==
The Czechs were a football world power in the 20th Century with their greatest achievement being winning 1976 European Championship against West Germany in the penalty shoot-out, thanks to the famous penalty of Antonin Panenka, they were also instrumental in forming football competitions in the early 20th Century. The Czechoslovak team qualified for the World Cup on eight occasions, finishing runner-up in the editions of 1934 and 1962, and for the European Championship in other three.

The country dissolved in 1993. It was split into the Slovakia national football team and the Czech Republic national football team.

== Attendances ==
The average attendance per top-flight football league season and the club with the highest average attendance:

Season	League average	Best club	Best club average
1992–93	5,379	Sparta Praha	11,431
1991–92	5,054	Sparta Praha	14,966
1990–91	4,091	Sparta Praha	8,581
1989–90	4,423	Sparta Praha	8,301
1988–89	5,616	Sparta Praha	10,839
1987–88	5,612	Sparta Praha	11,962
1986–87	5,256	Sparta Praha	11,835
1985–86	4,850	Sparta Praha	9,536
1984–85	5,383	Sparta Praha	13,727
1983–84	5,410	Sparta Praha	15,106
1982–83	5,550	Sparta Praha	10,628
1981–82	5,242	Sparta Praha	10,198
1980–81	6,125	Sparta Praha	14,722
1979–80	6,377	Sparta Praha	13,453
1978–79	5,475	Sparta Praha	11,390
1977–78	6,615	Slavia Praha	19,261
1976–77	6,642	Slavia Praha	12,019
1975–76	6,180	Slavia Praha	9,871
1974–75	7,668	Slavia Praha	12,540
1973–74	7,676	Slavia Praha	13,213
1972–73	7,106	Slavia Praha	11,455
1971–72	8,675	Slovan Bratislava	15,963
1970–71	6,699	Sparta Praha	14,822
1969–70	7,682	Sparta Praha	17,932
1968–69	8,212	Sparta Praha	16,997
1967–68	11,997	Sparta Praha	20,462
1966–67	10,531	Sparta Praha	21,052
1965–66	11,962	Sparta Praha	24,231
1964–65	8,906	Spartak Praha	21,502
1963–64	10,733	Spartak Praha	23,615
1962–63	12,142	Spartak Praha	26,077
1961–62	10,162	Spartak Praha	23,186
1960–61	10,755	Spartak Praha	20,084
1959–60	11,742	Spartak Praha	18,462
1958–59	11,368	Spartak Praha	16,615
1957–58	13,514	Spartak Praha	23,059
