= Ranulfo Cortés =

Mexican footballer (1931–1994)

Arnulfo Cortés
Personal information
- Date of birth: 9 July 1931
- Place of birth: Mexico
- Date of death: 3 April 1994 (aged 62)
- Position: Forward

Senior career*
Years	Team	Apps	(Gls)
- CD Oro

International career
- Mexico
- * Club domestic league appearances and goals

Arnulfo Cortés (9 July 1931 – 3 April 1994) was a Mexican football forward who was a squad member of the Mexico national team in the 1954 FIFA World Cup, although he never played for the national team. He also played for CD Oro. Cortés died on 3 April 1994, at the age of 62.
