= Mehmet Dinçer =

Turkish footballer

Personal information
- Place of birth: Istanbul, Turkey
- Position: Midfielder

Senior career*
| Years | Team | Apps | (Gls) |
- Fenerbahçe S.K.
- * Club domestic league appearances and goals

Mehmet Dinçer (date of death unknown) was a Turkish football midfielder who was a member of the Turkey national team at the 1954 FIFA World Cup. However, he never earned a cap for his country. He also played for Fenerbahçe S.K.
