= Jef Van Der Linden =

Belgian footballer

- Van Der Linden with Antwerp FC

Personal information
- Date of birth: 2 November 1927
- Place of birth: Antwerp, Belgium
- Date of death: 8 May 2008 (aged 80)
- Position: Defender

Senior career*
Years	Team	Apps	(Gls)
1947–1956	Royal Antwerp	162	(4)
- * Club domestic league appearances and goals

Jef Van Der Linden (2 November 1927 – 8 May 2008) was a Belgian football defender who was a member of the Belgium national team at the 1954 FIFA World Cup. However, he never earned a cap for Belgium.

== Club career ==
He also played for Royal Antwerp.

== Honours ==
Royal Antwerp FC

- Belgian Cup: 1954–55
