= Erol Keskin =

Turkish footballer

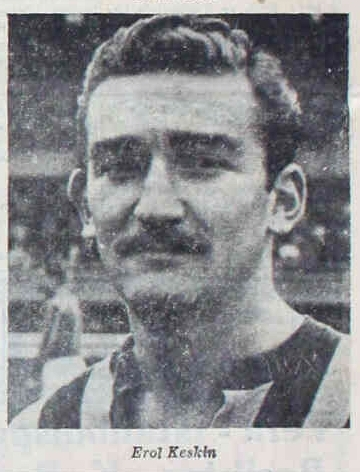
- Erol Keskin, was a Turkish national and Fenerbahçe SK player.

Personal information
- Date of birth: 2 March 1927
- Place of birth: Istanbul, Turkey
- Date of death: 1 October 2016 (aged 89)
- Place of death: Istanbul, Turkey
- Height: 1.70 m (5 ft 7 in)
- Position: Forward

Senior career*
| Years | Team | Apps | (Gls) |
| 1943–1951 | Fenerbahçe SK | 104 | (23) |
| 1951–1958 | Adalet SK | 93 | (18) |
| Total | | 197 | (41) |

International career
| 1948–1954 | Turkey | 15 | (2) |
- * Club domestic league appearances and goals

Erol Keskin (2 March 1927 – 1 October 2016) was a Turkish football forward who played for Turkey in the 1948 Summer Olympics and 1954 FIFA World Cup. He also played for Fenerbahçe SK and Adalet SK Istanbul.

== International statistics ==
=== International goals ===
| # | Date | Venue | Opponent | Score | Result | Competition |
|---|---|---|---|---|---|---|
| 1 | 20 November 1949 | 19 Mayıs Stadium, Ankara, Turkey | Syria | 5-0 | 7-0 | 1950 FIFA World Cup qual. |
| 2 | 17 June 1954 | Charmilles Stadium, Geneva, Switzerland | South Korea | 7-0 | 7-0 | 1954 FIFA World Cup |
Correct as of 7 October 2016
