= Xercès Louis =

French footballer (1926–1978)

Personal information
- Date of birth: 31 October 1926
- Place of birth: Sainte-Marie, Martinique
- Date of death: 6 March 1978 (aged 51)
- Position: Midfielder

Senior career*
Years	Team	Apps	(Gls)
1943–1949	Lyon OU		
1949–1957	Lens	259	(19)
1957–1960	Bordeaux	95	(10)

International career
1954–1956	France	12	(0)

Managerial career
- 1961–1962: UMS Montélimar
- 1972–1974: FC Sète
- * Club domestic league appearances and goals

Xercès Louis (31 October 1926 – 6 March 1978) was a French footballer who played as a midfielder. He won 12 caps for France between 1954 and 1956.
