= Josef Majer =

Czech footballer

Personal information
- Date of birth: 8 June 1925
- Place of birth: Czechoslovakia
- Date of death: 14 October 2013 (aged 88)
- Position: Forward

Senior career*
| Years | Team | Apps | (Gls) |
- SK Kladno
- * Club domestic league appearances and goals

Josef Majer (8 June 1925 – 14 October 2013) was a Czechoslovak football forward who was a member of the Czechoslovakia national team at the 1954 FIFA World Cup. However, he never earned a cap for the national team. He also played for SK Kladno. He died on 14 October 2013 at the age of 88.
