= Roberto Leopardi =

Uruguayan footballer (born 1933)

Personal information
- Full name: Roberto Rafael Leopardi Laporta
- Date of birth: 19 July 1933 (age 93)
- Place of birth: Uruguay
- Position: Midfielder

Senior career*
Years	Team	Apps	(Gls)
1952-1957	Nacional		
1957-1959	Genoa		
1959-1960	Vicenza		
1960-1961	Nacional		
1961-1962	Peñarol		
1962-1963	Miramar Misiones		
1964-1965	Deportivo Galicia		

International career
1954-1956	Uruguay	7	(0)
Medal record
Men's football
Representing Uruguay
South American Championship
Winner	1956 Uruguay
- * Club domestic league appearances and goals

Roberto Rafael Leopardi Laporta (born 19 July 1933) is a Uruguayan football midfielder who was in Uruguay’s squad for the 1954 FIFA World Cup. He won the 1956 South American Championship with Uruguay.
