= Basri Dirimlili =

Turkish footballer

Personal information
- Date of birth: 7 June 1929
- Place of birth: Dârstor, Romania
- Date of death: 14 September 1997 (aged 68)
- Place of death: Turkey
- Height: 1.78 m (5 ft 10 in)
- Position: Defender

Senior career*
| Years | Team | Apps | (Gls) |
| –1951 | Eskişehir Demirspor | | |
| 1951–1963 | Fenerbahçe | 372 | (7) |
| 1963–1964 | Karşıyaka | 2 | (0) |

International career
| 1953–1961 | Turkey | 26 | (0) |

Managerial career
- 1965–1966: Feriköy
- 1966–1967: Vefa S.K.
- 1969–1970: Samsunspor
- 1970–1971: İstanbulspor
- * Club domestic league appearances and goals

Basri Dirimlili (7 June 1929 – 14 September 1997), nicknamed Mehmetcik Basri, was a Turkish football player.

== Career ==
Born in Dârstor, Romania (now Silistra, Bulgaria), Dirimlili began playing football for Eskişehir Demirspor. He transferred to Fenerbahçe in 1951. He played 26 times for Turkey and was a member of 1952 National Olympic Team and the 1954 FIFA World Cup team.

He also worked as assistant manager for Fenerbahçe with Ignace Molnar, Traian Ionescu, Didi and Branko Stanković. He also managed Feriköy, Vefa S.K., Samsunspor and Istanbulspor.
