= Anton Krásnohorský =

Slovak footballer

Personal information
- Full name: Anton Krásnohorský
- Date of birth: 22 October 1925
- Date of death: 25 July 1988 (aged 62)
- Position: Defender

International career
Years	Team	Apps	(Gls)
1949–1952	Czechoslovakia	9	(0)

Anton Krásnohorský (22 October 1925 – 25 July 1988) was a Slovak footballer who played as a defender. He played for several clubs, including Iskra Žilina. He made nine appearances for the Czechoslovakia national team and was a participant at the 1954 FIFA World Cup.
