= Jacques Grimonpon =

French footballer (1925–2013)

Personal information
- Date of birth: 30 July 1925
- Place of birth: Tourcoing, France
- Date of death: 23 January 2013 (aged 87)
- Place of death: Cap Ferret, France
- Position: Defender

Senior career*
Years	Team	Apps	(Gls)
1945–1947	Lille		
1947–1948	Le Havre		
1948–1951	Lyon	99	(0)
1951–1953	Le Havre	64	(0)
1953–1957	Bordeaux	107	(2)

International career
1954	France	0	(0)
- * Club domestic league appearances and goals

Jacques Grimonpon (30 July 1925 – 23 January 2013) was a French footballer who played as a defender played for Lille, Le Havre, Lyon, Bordeaux. He was called up for 1954 FIFA World Cup but never played for France.
