= Roger Mathis =

Swiss footballer

Personal information
- Date of birth: 4 April 1921
- Place of birth: Switzerland
- Date of death: 9 July 2015 (aged 94)
- Position: Defender

Senior career*
Years	Team	Apps	(Gls)
- FC Lausanne-Sport

International career
- Switzerland
- * Club domestic league appearances and goals

Roger Mathis (4 April 1921 – 9 July 2015) was a Swiss football defender who played for Switzerland in the 1954 FIFA World Cup. He also played for FC Lausanne-Sport. Mathis died in July 2015 at the age of 94.
