= Jaroslav Košnar =

Slovak footballer

Personal information
- Date of birth: 17 August 1930
- Place of birth: Czechoslovakia
- Date of death: 21 April 1985 (aged 54)

International career
Years	Team	Apps	(Gls)
1953–1954	Czechoslovakia	2	(0)

Jaroslav Košnar (17 August 1930 – 21 April 1985) was a Slovak football player. He played for Czechoslovakia, for which he played two matches.

He was a participant at the 1954 FIFA World Cup.
