= David Van Hoyweghen =

Belgian footballer

Personal information
- Date of birth: 20 March 1976 (age 50)
- Place of birth: Hamme, Belgium
- Height: 1.88 m (6 ft 2 in)
- Position: Defender

Senior career*
Years	Team	Apps	(Gls)
1995–1998	Beveren	50	(3)
1998–2002	Eendracht Aalst	91	(9)
2002–2005	Gent	64	(3)
2005–2006	Sint-Truiden	22	(0)
2006–2007	Beveren	27	(1)
2007–2009	Roeselare	4	(0)
2009–2010	FCN Sint-Niklaas		
2011–2012	HSV Hoek	0	(0)
- * Club domestic league appearances and goals

David Van Hoyweghen (born 20 March 1976 in Hamme) is a Belgian former professional footballer who last played for HSV Hoek.

As a young player Van Hoyweghen began playing for K.F.C. V.W. Hamme before joining K.S.K. Beveren in 1988. In 1995 Van Hoyweghen made his debut for the first team. In 1998 Van Hoyweghen joined Eendracht Aalst, another club from the Jupiler League. After the relegation of Eendracht Aalst the defender was taken in by K.A.A. Gent. There he played 3 years before joining Sint-Truiden V.V. In the 2006–2007 season David rejoined his former club K.S.K. Beveren but the future did not look very good for the club after their relegation at the end of the season. Therefore, Van Hoyweghen stepped over to Roeselare.
