= Kang Chang-gi =

South Korean footballer (1927–2007)

Kang Chang-Gi 강창기
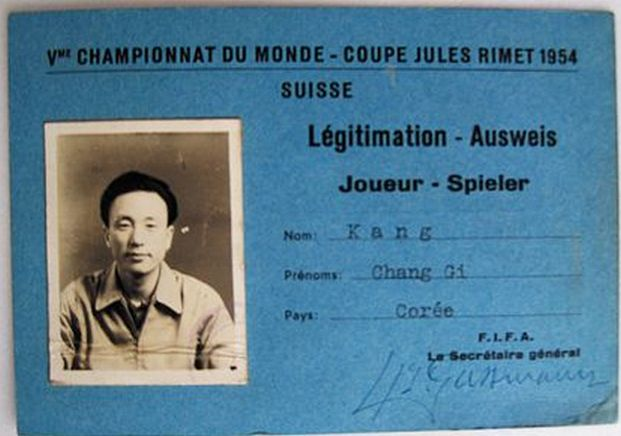
- Kang Chang Gi, defender of South Korea NT at the 1954 World Cup

Personal information
- Date of birth: 28 August 1927
- Place of birth: Korea, Empire of Japan
- Date of death: 5 January 2007 (aged 78)
- Place of death: Seoul, South Korea
- Position: Midfielder

Senior career*
Years	Team	Apps	(Gls)
- Seoul Football Club

International career
- South Korea
- * Club domestic league appearances and goals

Kang Chang-Gi (Korean: 강창기; Hanja: 姜昌基; 28 August 1927 – 5 January 2007) was a South Korean football midfielder who played for the South Korea in the 1954 FIFA World Cup. He also played for Seoul Football Club.
