= Salvador Mota =

Mexican footballer (1922-1986)

Personal information
- Full name: Salvador Mota Moreno
- Date of birth: 30 November 1922
- Place of birth: Guadalajara, Mexico
- Date of death: 20 February 1986 (aged 63)
- Place of death: Mexico City
- Height: 1.76 m (5 ft 9 in)
- Position: Goalkeeper

Senior career*
Years	Team	Apps	(Gls)
1942–1944	América		
1944–1947	Guadalajara		
1949–1956	Atlante		

International career
1954	Mexico	1	(0)
- * Club domestic league appearances and goals

Salvador Mota Moreno (30 November 1922 – 20 February 1986) was a Mexican football goalkeeper who played for Mexico in the 1954 FIFA World Cup.
