= Çetin Zeybek =

Turkish footballer

Personal information
- Date of birth: 12 September 1932
- Place of birth: Bandırma, Turkey
- Date of death: 10 November 1990 (aged 58)
- Height: 1.83 m (6 ft 0 in)
- Position: Midfielder

Senior career*
Years	Team	Apps	(Gls)
1951–1958	Kasımpaşa S.K.		
1959–1960	Feriköyspor		

International career
- Turkey
- * Club domestic league appearances and goals

Çetin Zeybek (12 September 1932 – 10 November 1990) was a Turkish football midfielder who played for Turkey in the 1954 FIFA World Cup. He also played for Kasımpaşa S.K.
