= Li Jong-kap =

South Korean footballer

Personal information
- Date of birth: 18 March 1918
- Place of birth: Longjing, Republic of China
- Date of death: 1993 (aged 74–75)
- Position: Defender

Senior career*
Years	Team	Apps	(Gls)
- Joseon Electric Power

International career
1954–1956	South Korea	9	(0)
- * Club domestic league appearances and goals

- Li Jong-kap
- Hangul: 이종갑
- Hanja: 李鍾甲
- RR: I Jonggap
- MR: I Chonggap

Li Jong-kap (Korean: 이종갑; Hanja: 李鍾甲; 18 March 1918 – 1993) was a South Korean football defender who played for the South Korea in the 1954 FIFA World Cup. He also played for Joseon Electric Power.
