= Narciso López (footballer) =

Mexican footballer (born 1928)

Personal information
- Full name: Narciso López Rodríguez
- Date of birth: 18 August 1928
- Place of birth: Chapulimita, Jalisco, Mexico
- Date of death: January 1988 (age 59)
- Position: Defender

Senior career*
| Years | Team | Apps | (Gls) |
| 1948–1958 | CD Oro | | |
| 1958–1960 | C.D. Guadalajara | | |
| 1962–1963 | CD Nacional | | |

International career
| 1953–1956 | Mexico | 10 | (0) |
- * Club domestic league appearances and goals

Narciso López Rodríguez (18 August 1928 – January 1988) was a Mexican football defender who played for Mexico in the 1954 FIFA World Cup. He also played for CD Oro.

== International career ==
López won his first cap for Mexico on 27 December 1953 in a 4–0 win over Haiti during 1954 FIFA World Cup qualification. He played in both of Mexico's games at the 1954 FIFA World Cup, defeats to Brazil and France. He played in all five of Mexico's games of the 1956 Panamerican Championship.

== International statistics ==
Appearances and goals by national team and year
| National team | Year | Apps | Goals |
|---|---|---|---|
| Mexico | 1953 | 1 | 0 |
| Mexico | 1954 | 4 | 0 |
| Mexico | 1956 | 5 | 0 |
| Total | | 10 | 0 |

== Honours ==
C.D. Guadalajara

- Mexican Primera División: 1958–59, 1959–60
- Campeón de Campeones: 1959, 1960
