= Şükrü Ersoy =

Turkish footballer (1931–2026)

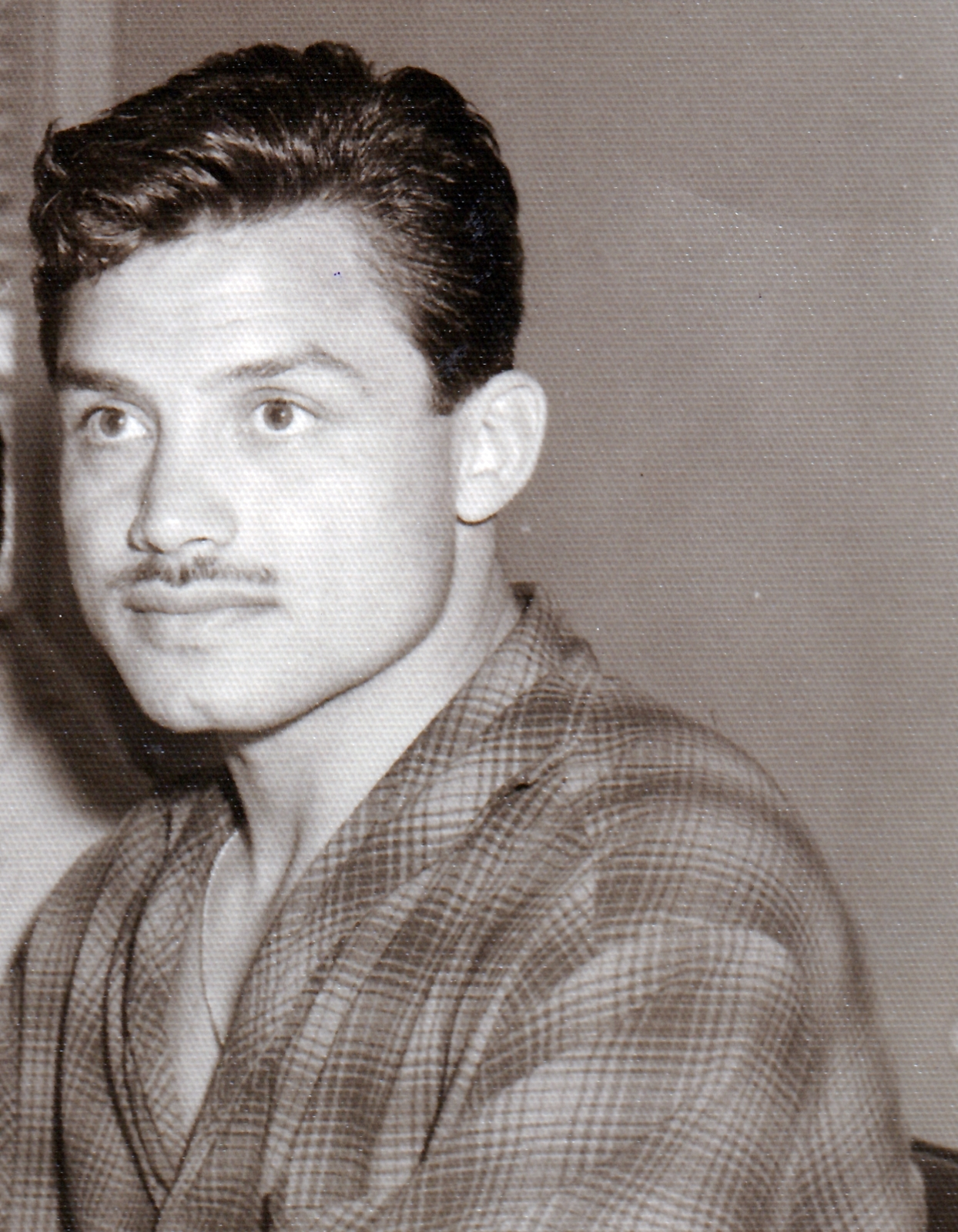

Personal information
- Date of birth: 14 January 1931
- Place of birth: Kadıköy, Turkey
- Date of death: 29 September 2026 (aged 95)
- Height: 1.78 m (5 ft 10 in)
- Position: Goalkeeper

Youth career
- 1945-1949: Fenerbahçe

Senior career*
Years	Team	Apps	(Gls)
1949–1952	Vefa S.K.	35	(0)
1953–1954	Ankaragücü		
1954–1962	Fenerbahçe	262	(0)
1962–1964	Austria Salzburg		

International career
1950–1957	Turkey	8	(0)

Managerial career
- 1975: Trabzonspor
- 1979: Fenerbahçe
- 1980: Altay
- * Club domestic league appearances and goals

Ali Şükrü Ersoy (14 January 1931 – 29 September 2026) was a Turkish football player and manager. A goalkeeper, he made eight appearances for the Turkey national team and was part of the squad at the 1954 FIFA World Cup.

== Career ==
Born in Kadıköy, Ersoy began playing youth football for Fenerbahçe. He played for Vefa S.K. and Ankaragücü before appearing for the Fenerbahçe senior squad. He finished his career with Austria Salzburg.

Ersoy studied to be a football coach in Cologne, Germany and received his license in 1967.

== Death ==
Ersoy died on 29 September 2026, at the age of 95. He was buried at Karacaahmet Cemetery on 2 October.

Ersoy was the last living member of Turkey's 1954 World Cup team, and also the last from any team who actually played a game.
