= Jo Backaert =

Belgian footballer (1921–1997)

- Backaert with Charleroi SC

Personal information
- Full name: Joseph Backaert
- Date of birth: 5 August 1921
- Place of birth: Bressoux, Liège, Belgium
- Date of death: 12 June 1997 (aged 75)
- Position: Midfielder

Senior career*
Years	Team	Apps	(Gls)
- R. Charleroi S.C.
- * Club domestic league appearances and goals

Joseph Backaert (5 August 1921 – 12 June 1997) was a Belgian football midfielder who was a member of the Belgium national team at the 1954 FIFA World Cup. However, he never earned a cap for Belgium. He also played for R. Olympic Charleroi C.C.
