= Luc Van Hoyweghen =

Belgian footballer

Personal information
- Date of birth: 1 January 1929
- Place of birth: Appels, Belgium
- Date of death: 30 June 2013 (aged 84)
- Place of death: Dendermonde, Belgium
- Position: Forward

Senior career*
Years	Team	Apps	(Gls)
- R. Daring Club Molenbeek
- * Club domestic league appearances and goals

Luc Van Hoyweghen (1 January 1929 – 30 June 2013) was a Belgian football forward who was a member of the Belgium national team at the 1954 FIFA World Cup. However, he never earned a cap for Belgium. He also played for R. Daring Club Molenbeek.
