= Křídla vlasti Olomouc =

- Full name: Křídla vlasti Olomouc
- Founded: 1952
- Dissolved: 1975

Křídla vlasti Olomouc, also known as Dukla Olomouc, was a Czechoslovak football club from the town of Olomouc, which played two seasons in the Czechoslovak First League. It was founded in 1951 before changing its name to Dukla Olomouc in 1956. The club's last top-flight season was the 1954 Czechoslovak First League, finishing in 11th position among 12 teams. The club ceased to exist in 1975.

== Historical names ==
- 1952 – Křídla vlasti Olomouc
- 1956 – Dukla Olomouc
