= Han Chang-wha =

South Korean footballer

Han Chang-wha 한창화
Personal information
- Date of birth: 3 November 1922
- Place of birth: Korea, Empire of Japan
- Date of death: 18 April 2006 (aged 83)
- Position: Defender

Senior career*
Years	Team	Apps	(Gls)
- Seoul Football Club

International career
- South Korea
- * Club domestic league appearances and goals

Han Chang-wha (Korean: 한창화; Hanja: 韓昌華, 3 November 1922 – 18 April 2006) was a South Korean football defender who played for South Korea in the 1954 FIFA World Cup. He also played for Seoul Football Club.
