= Lee Sang-yi (footballer) =

South Korean footballer

Lee Sang-Yi 이상의
Personal information
- Date of birth: 1922
- Place of birth: Korea under Japanese rule
- Date of death: Unknown
- Position: Midfielder

Senior career*
Years	Team	Apps	(Gls)
- Seoul Football Club

International career
- South Korea
- * Club domestic league appearances and goals

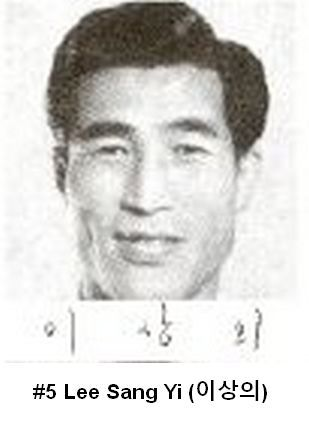
Lee Sang Yi (South Korea) was in the squad but did not play at the 1954 World Cup. He played in both matches against Japan in World Cup Qualification. He also played in the 1954 Asian games where South Korea would lose in the finals. He later immigrated to Toronto, Ontario, Canada.

Lee Sang-Yi (Korean: 이상의, born 1922, date of death unknown) was a South Korean football midfielder who played for the South Korea in the 1954 FIFA World Cup. He also played for Seoul Football Club.
