= Lazare Gianessi =

French footballer (1925–2009)

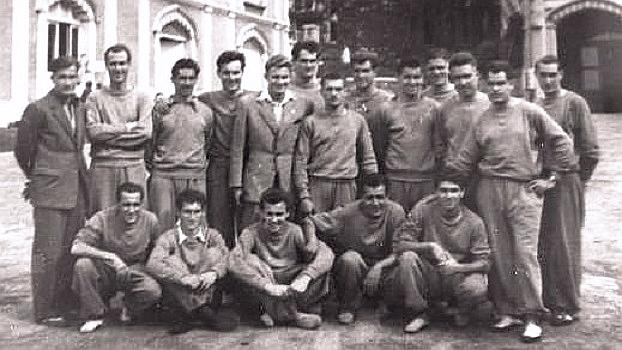
- Equipe France Olympique 1948

Personal information
- Full name: Lazare Gianessi
- Date of birth: 9 November 1925
- Place of birth: Aniche, Nord, France
- Date of death: 10 August 2009 (aged 83)
- Place of death: Concarneau, Finistère, France
- Height: 1.81 m (5 ft 11 in)
- Position: Defender

Youth career
- CS Avion

Senior career*
Years	Team	Apps	(Gls)
–1946	Lens		
1946–1949	Olympique Saint-Quentin		
1949–1952	CO Roubaix-Tourcoing	130	(1)
1952–1954	Monaco	40	(1)
1958–1959	Lens		
1959–1960	CO Roubaix-Tourcoing	17	(0)

International career
1948	France Olympic	Called up	
1952–1954	France	14	(0)
- * Club domestic league appearances and goals

Lazare Gianessi (9 November 1925 – 10 August 2009) was a French football defender. He was part of France's squad for the 1948 Summer Olympics and for the 1954 FIFA World Cup

== International career ==
He was selected in France Football squad for the 1948 Summer Olympics, but was an unused substitute for the two Games against India and Great Britain as France were eliminated in the Quarterfinals. He had his first cap against West Germany on 5 October 1952. He was selected for the 1954 FIFA World Cup and played France's both games against Yugoslavia and Mexico. The game against Mexico was his 14th and last cap.
