= Ivo Frosio =

Swiss footballer (1930–2019)

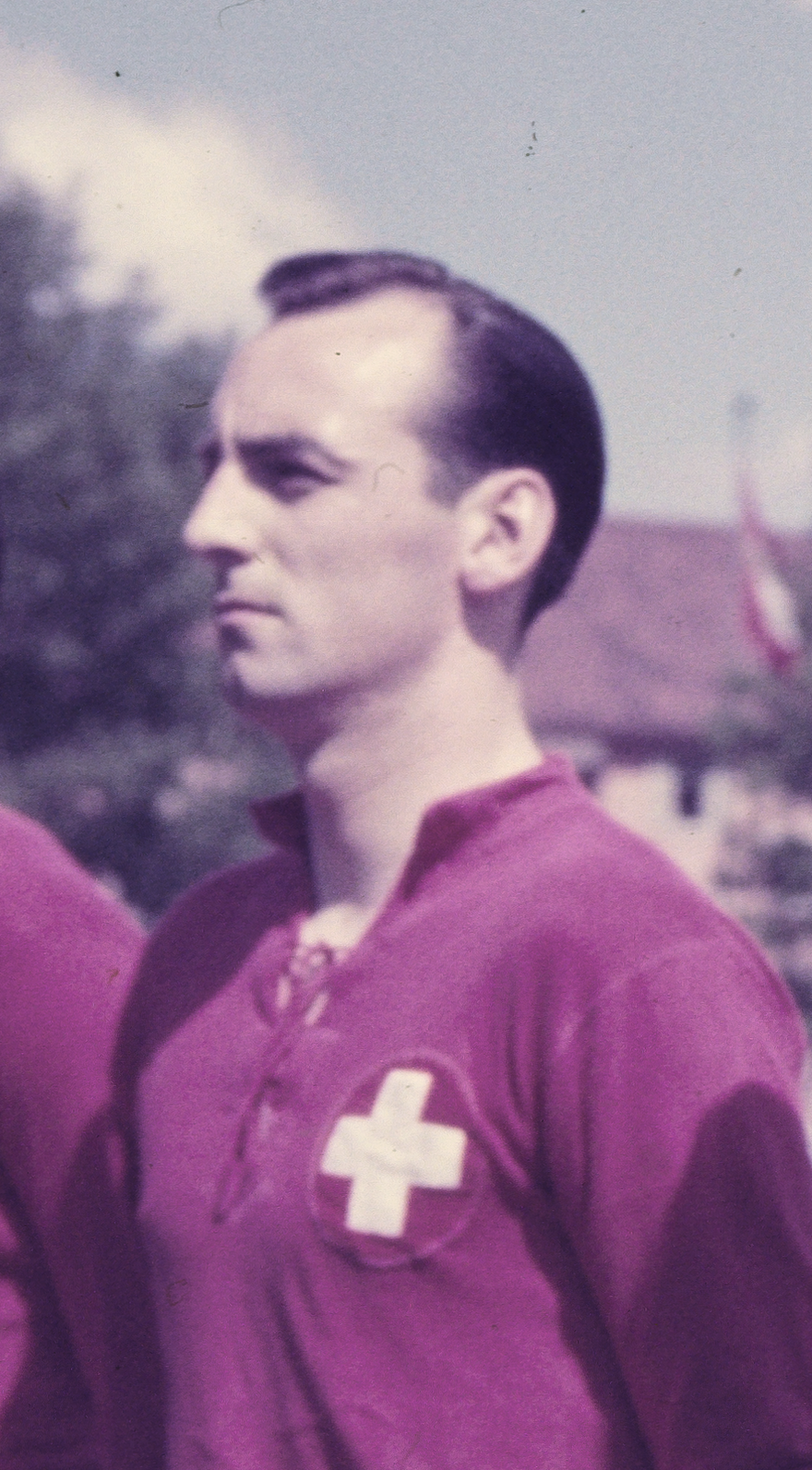
- Frosio in 1954

Personal information
- Date of birth: 27 April 1930
- Place of birth: Switzerland
- Date of death: 18 April 2019 (aged 88)
- Position: Midfielder

Senior career*
Years	Team	Apps	(Gls)
1952–1957	Grasshopper Club Zürich		
1957–1961	FC Lugano		

International career
1952–1959	Switzerland	13	(0)
- * Club domestic league appearances and goals

Ivo Frosio (27 April 1930 – 18 April 2019) was a Swiss football midfielder who played for Switzerland in the 1954 FIFA World Cup. He also played for Grasshopper Club Zürich and FC Lugano.
