= Jorge Romo =

Mexican footballer (1923–2014)

Personal information
- Full name: Jorge Romo Fuentes
- Date of birth: 20 April 1923
- Place of birth: Havana, Cuba
- Date of death: 17 June 2014 (aged 91)
- Place of death: Cuernavaca, Mexico
- Position: Midfielder

Senior career*
Years	Team	Apps	(Gls)
1947–1950	Club Asturias		
1950–1954	Club Deportivo Marte		
1954–1961	Deportivo Toluca		

International career
1949–1960	Mexico	13	(0)
- * Club domestic league appearances and goals

Jorge Romo Fuentes (20 April 1923 – 17 June 2014) was a Cuban-Mexican football midfielder who played for Mexico in the 1954 and 1958 FIFA World Cups. He also played for Club Asturias, Club Deportivo Marte and Deportivo Toluca.

== Early life ==
Romo was born in Havana, Cuba to Mexican parents.
