= Rıdvan Bolatlı =

Turkish footballer (1928–2022)

Personal information
- Date of birth: 2 December 1928
- Place of birth: Ankara, Turkey
- Date of death: 31 March 2022 (aged 93)
- Position: Defender

Senior career*
Years	Team	Apps	(Gls)
1952–1954	Ankaragücü		

International career
1953–1954	Turkey	6	(0)
- * Club domestic league appearances and goals

Rıdvan Bolatlı (2 December 1928 – 31 March 2022) was a Turkish professional footballer who played in Turkey for Ankaragücü. He was born in Ankara.

== International career ==
Bolatlı made six appearances for the full Turkey national team, including appearing in three matches at the 1954 FIFA World Cup finals and the 1952 Summer Olympics in Helsinki.
