= Necmi Onarıcı =

Turkish footballer (1925–1968)

Personal information
- Date of birth: 2 November 1925
- Place of birth: Kadıköy, Turkey
- Date of death: 21 August 1968 (aged 42)
- Height: 1.78 m (5 ft 10 in)
- Position: Forward

Senior career*
Years	Team	Apps	(Gls)
–1948	Kasımpaşa		
1948–1949	Fenerbahçe		
1949–1952	Kasımpaşa		
1952–1955	Adalet		
1955–1958	Vefa		
1958–1959	Adalet		

International career
1954	Turkey	2	(0)
- * Club domestic league appearances and goals

Necmi Onarıcı (2 November 1925 – 21 August 1968) was a Turkish football forward who played for Turkey in the 1954 FIFA World Cup. He also played for Adalet SK Istanbul.
