= Rober Eryol =

Turkish footballer (1930–2000)

Personal information
- Full name: Rober İsaac Eryol
- Date of birth: 21 December 1930
- Place of birth: Mersin, Turkey
- Date of death: 21 December 2000 (aged 70)
- Place of death: Maltepe, Istanbul, Turkey

Senior career*
| Years | Team | Apps | (Gls) |
| 1947–1959 | Galatasaray SK | 78 | (1) |

International career
| 1951–1954 | Turkey | 11 | (0) |

Managerial career
- 1961–1962: Hapoel Be'er-Sheva
- * Club domestic league appearances and goals

Rober İsaac Eryol (21 December 1930 – 21 December 2000) was a Turkish football player.

== Background ==
He was born on 21 December 1930 in Mersin, Turkey. He was of Jewish origin. His grandfather, also named Rober Ishak Eryol, was martyred serving the Ottoman Empire in action during the Battle of Gallipoli. Rober Eryol died in December 2000 in Maltepe, Istanbul.

== Galatasaray ==
Eryol began his football career in Istanbul soon after his family moved to Taksim, Istanbul in 1937. He joined Galatasaray when he was 16 years old in 1947. Rober said "After I played for different amateur teams in Istanbul, I was wanted by Pera (Beyoğlu) and Taksim football clubs. I did not want to play for any of them. Because, at the time, only ethnic minorities used to play for these two teams. As I am a non-Muslim, I was advised to play for one of these two teams. I refused this as I felt that I am a Turkish. Therefore, I decided to play for Galatasaray. I wanted to prove that as a Turkish citizen, I am not different. I proudly proved this by playing for Galatasaray and the national team."

He played for Galatasaray as a left halfback.

He won Istanbul Sunday League once in 1948–49 season and Istanbul Professional League for 3 times in 1954–55, 1955–56 and 1957–58 seasons, with Galatasaray.

== Turkey National Team ==
He represented the Turkey national football team 9 times (3 games at the 1954 FIFA World Cup). His first game for Turkey against Switzerland on 25 May 1953 in Berne, Switzerland. He won the Military World Games in 1955 in Italy with Turkey. Rober Eryol also played for Turkey's B-Team on two occasions.

== See also ==
- List of one-club men
