= François Remetter =

French footballer (1928–2022)

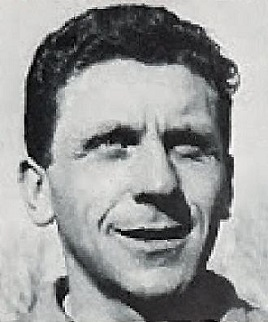
- Remetter in 1950

Personal information
- Date of birth: 8 August 1928
- Place of birth: Strasbourg, France
- Date of death: 30 September 2022 (aged 94)
- Place of death: Strasbourg, France
- Height: 1.71 m (5 ft 7 in)
- Position: Goalkeeper

Senior career*
Years	Team	Apps	(Gls)
1948–1949	Strasbourg		
1949–1950	Thillot		
1950–1954	Metz	131	(0)
1954–1957	Sochaux	102	(0)
1957–1958	Bordeaux	36	(0)
1958–1959	Grenoble	37	(0)
1959–1960	Limoges	37	(0)
1960–1964	Strasbourg	130	(0)
1964–1966	Limoges	86	(0)
1966–1968	Vauban Strasbourg		

International career
1953–1959	France	26	(0)
Medal record
Representing France
FIFA World Cup
Third place	1958 Sweden
- * Club domestic league appearances and goals

François Remetter (8 August 1928 – 30 September 2022) was a French footballer who played as a goalkeeper. He was the last surviving member of the French 1954 FIFA World Cup squad.

== International career ==
Remetter played for France at the World Cup finals of 1954 and 1958.
