= Brandãozinho (footballer, born 1925) =

Brazilian footballer

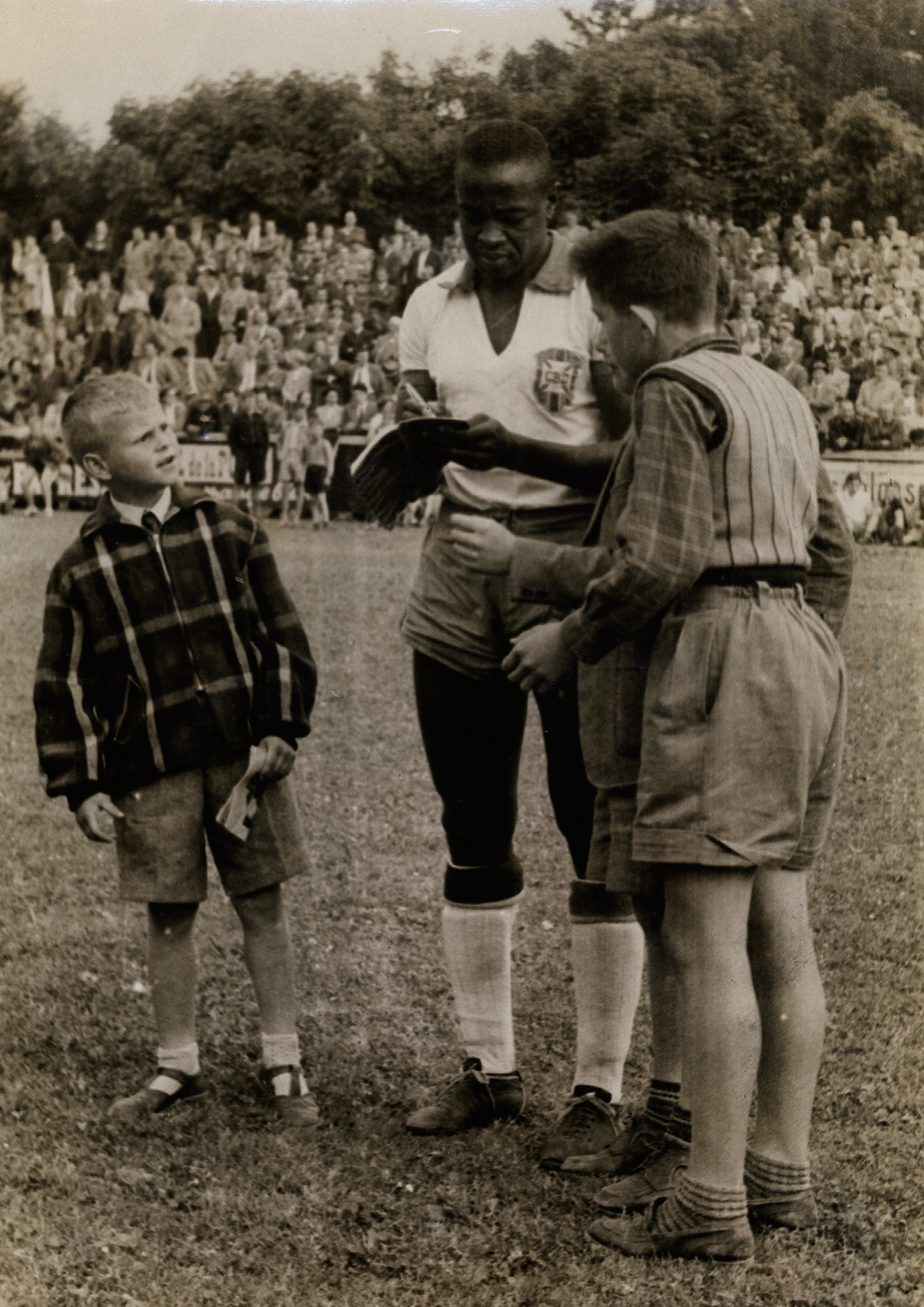
- Brandãozinho in 1954

Personal information
- Full name: Antenor Lucas
- Date of birth: June 9, 1925
- Place of birth: Brazil
- Date of death: April 4, 2000 (aged 74)
- Position: Defender

International career
Years	Team	Apps	(Gls)
1952-1954	Brazil		

Antenor Lucas, better known as Brandãozinho (born in Campinas, Brazil, June 9, 1925 – died in São Paulo, Brazil, April 4, 2000) was a Brazilian football defender.

In his career (1940–1956), he played for Campinas, Associação Atlética Portuguesa Santista and Associação Portuguesa de Desportos. He won two Torneio Rio-São Paulo in 1952 and 1955. For the Brazil National Football Team, he played 18 games, and participated in the 1954 FIFA World Cup in Switzerland, playing 3 matches.

After he retired, he was a Mathematics Teacher in Lavras and Sete Lagoas. He died at 74 years old.

== Honours ==
Portuguesa

- Torneio Rio – São Paulo: 1952, 1955

Brazil

- Panamerican Championship: 1952
- Copa América runner-up: 1953
