= Rafael Ávalos =

Mexican footballer (1925-1993)

Personal information
- Full name: Rafael Ávalos Rivas
- Date of birth: November 22, 1925
- Place of birth: Mexico
- Date of death: April 15, 1993 (aged 67)
- Height: 1.86 m (6 ft 1 in)
- Position: Midfielder

Senior career*
| Years | Team | Apps | (Gls) |
- Atlante

International career
| 1953–1954 | Mexico | 6 | (1) |
- * Club domestic league appearances and goals

Rafael Ávalos Rivas (November 22, 1925 – April 15, 1993) was a Mexican football midfielder who played for the Mexico national team in the 1954 FIFA World Cup. He also played for Atlante.
