= Li Ki-joo =

South Korean footballer

Lee Ki-Joo 이기주
Personal information
- Date of birth: 12 November 1926
- Place of birth: Korea, Empire of Japan
- Date of death: 9 December 1996 (aged 70)
- Position: Forward

Youth career
- Joongdong High School
- Korea University

International career
Years	Team	Apps	(Gls)
- South Korea

Managerial career
- Keumseong Textile Company (Coach)

Lee Ki-Joo (Korean: 이기주; Hanja: 李錡柱, 12 November 1926 – 9 December 1996) was a South Korean football forward who played for the South Korea in the 1954 FIFA World Cup. He also played for Busan University.
