= Fritz Laband =

German footballer (1925–1982)

Personal information
- Full name: Friedrich Laband
- Date of birth: 1 November 1925
- Place of birth: Hindenburg, Germany
- Date of death: 3 January 1982 (aged 56)
- Place of death: Hamburg, West Germany
- Position: Defender

Youth career
- 1936–1937: Reichsbahn SV Hindenburg
- 1938–1943: Hindenburg 09
- 1943–1945: Preußen Hindenburg

Senior career*
Years	Team	Apps	(Gls)
1945–1950	ZSG Anker Wismar		
1950–1956	Hamburger SV	122	(0)
1956–1957	Werder Bremen	10	(0)

International career
1954	West Germany	4	(0)
Medal record
Representing West Germany
FIFA World Cup
Winner	1954 Switzerland
- * Club domestic league appearances and goals

Fritz Laband (1 November 1925 – 3 January 1982) was a German footballer who played as a defender.

He was part of the West Germany national team that won the 1954 FIFA World Cup. In total he earned four caps for West Germany. During his club career he played for FC Anker Wismar, Hamburger SV and Werder Bremen.

His standard position being that of a right full back, Laband was a thorough-going and powerful player with good long range passing ability. With his international debut coming less than two months before the 1954 FIFA World Cup, he managed to play in three of Germany's six games at that tournament. For the semi-final and the final, coach Sepp Herberger however decided to move his Hamburg club teammate Josef Posipal to the right back position.
