= China national football team records and statistics =

This is a list of China national football team's all kinds of competitive records.

== Individual records ==
=== Player records ===
As of 26 March 2024.
Players in bold are still active with China.

==== Most capped players ====
Rank	Name	Caps	Goals	Career
1	Li Weifeng	112	14	1998–2011
2	Gao Lin	109	22	2005–2019
3	Zheng Zhi	108	15	2002–2019
4	Hao Haidong	106	41	1992–2004
4	Fan Zhiyi	106	17	1992–2002
6	Li Tie	92	6	1997–2010
7	Zhao Xuri	87	2	2003–present
8	Ma Mingyu	86	12	1996–2002
8	Li Ming	86	8	1992–2004
10	**Hao Junmin**	88	13	2005–present

==== Top goalscorers ====
Rank	Name	Goals	Caps	Ratio	Career
1	Hao Haidong	41	106	0.39	1992–2004
2	Yang Xu	29	55	0.53	2009–2023
3	Su Maozhen	27	53	0.51	1994–2002
4	Li Jinyu	24	70	0.34	1997–2008
5	**Wu Lei**	36	98	0.32	2010–present
6	Gao Lin	22	109	0.2	2005–2019
7	Ma Lin	21	45	0.47	1985–1990
8	Liu Haiguang	20	57	0.35	1983–1990
8	Li Bing	20	65	0.31	1992–2001
10	Zhao Dayu	19	29	0.66	1982–1986
10	**Yu Dabao**	19	67	0.31	2010–present

=== Manager records ===
Most manager appearances
(China) Gao Fengwen: 56

== Team records ==
Biggest victory
19–0 vs. Guam, 26 January 2000

== Competitive record ==
=== FIFA World Cup ===
China has only appeared at the one World Cup with the appearance being in the 2002 FIFA World Cup where they finished bottom of the group which included a 4–0 loss to Brazil.

China's FIFA World Cup record									Qualification record						
Year	Round	Position	M	W	D	L	GF	GA	M	W	D	L	GF	GA	Link
(Uruguay) 1930	Not a FIFA member								Not a FIFA member						Link
(Italy) 1934	Did not enter								Declined participation						Link
(France) 1938	Did not enter								Declined participation						Link
(Brazil) 1950	Did not enter								Declined participation						Link
(Switzerland) 1954	Did not enter								Declined participation						Link
(Sweden) 1958	Did not qualify								3	1	1	1	4	5	Link
(Chile) 1962	Did not enter								Declined participation						Link
(England) 1966	Did not enter								Declined participation						Link
(Mexico) 1970	Did not enter								Declined participation						Link
(Germany) 1974	Did not enter								Declined participation						Link
(Argentina) 1978	Did not enter								Declined participation						Link
(Spain) 1982	Did not qualify								12	7	2	3	19	8	Link
(Mexico) 1986	Did not qualify								6	4	1	1	23	2	Link
(Italy) 1990	Did not qualify								11	7	0	4	18	9	Link
(United States) 1994	Did not qualify								8	6	0	2	18	4	Link
(France) 1998	Did not qualify								14	8	3	3	24	16	Link
(South Korea) (Japan) 2002	Group stage	31st	3	0	0	3	0	9	14	12	1	1	38	5	Link
(Germany) 2006	Did not qualify								6	5	0	1	14	1	Link
(South Africa) 2010	Did not qualify								8	3	3	2	14	4	Link
(Brazil) 2014	Did not qualify								8	5	0	3	23	9	Link
(Russia) 2018	Did not qualify								18	8	5	5	35	11	Link
(Qatar) 2022	Did not qualify								18	7	4	7	39	22	Link
(Canada) (Mexico) (United States) 2026	Did not qualify								16	5	2	9	16	29	Link
(Morocco) (Portugal) (Spain) 2030	To be determined														
(Saudi Arabia) 2034	To be determined														
Total	Group stage	1/23	3	0	0	3	0	9	142	78	22	42	285	125	Link

=== AFC Asian Cup ===
China's AFC Asian Cup record									Qualification record						
Year	Round	Position	Pld	W	D	L	GF	GA	Pld	W	D	L	GF	GA	Link
(Hong Kong) 1956	Did not enter								Did not enter						Link
(South Korea) 1960	Did not enter								Did not enter						Link
(Israel) 1964	Did not enter								Did not enter						Link
(Iran) 1968	Did not enter								Did not enter						Link
(Thailand) 1972	Did not enter								Did not enter						Link
(Iran) 1976	Third place	3rd	4	1	1	2	2	4	5	4	0	1	14	4	Link
(Kuwait) 1980	Group stage	7th	4	1	1	2	9	5	3	2	0	1	5	2	Link
(Singapore) 1984	Runners-up	2nd	6	4	0	2	11	4	4	4	0	0	15	0	Link
(Qatar) 1988	Fourth place	4th	6	2	2	2	7	5	5	2	3	0	10	1	Link
(Japan) 1992	Third place	3rd	5	1	3	1	6	6	3	3	0	0	7	0	Link
(United Arab Emirates) 1996	Quarter-finals	8th	4	1	0	3	6	7	3	3	0	0	16	1	Link
(Lebanon) 2000	Fourth place	4th	6	2	2	2	11	7	3	3	0	0	29	0	Link
(China) 2004	Runners-up	2nd	6	3	2	1	13	6	Qualified as hosts						Link
(Indonesia) (Malaysia) (Thailand) (Vietnam) 2007	Group stage	9th	3	1	1	1	7	6	6	3	2	1	7	3	Link
(Qatar) 2011	Group stage	9th	3	1	1	1	4	4	6	4	1	1	13	5	Link
(Australia) 2015	Quarter-finals	7th	4	3	0	1	5	4	6	2	2	2	5	6	Link
(United Arab Emirates) 2019	Quarter-finals	6th	5	3	0	2	7	7	8	5	2	1	27	1	Link
(Qatar) 2023	Group stage	18th	3	0	2	1	0	1	8	6	1	1	30	3	Link
(Saudi Arabia) 2027	Qualified								6	2	2	2	9	9	Link
Total	14/19	0 titles	59	23	15	21	88	66	66	43	13	10	187	35	Link

=== Summer Olympics ===
Year	Result	Pos	Pld	W	D	L	GF	GA
(France) 1900 to (Netherlands) 1928	Did not enter							
(Germany) 1936	First round	12	1	0	0	1	0	2
(United Kingdom) 1948	First round	14	1	0	0	1	0	4
(Finland) 1952 to (Australia) 1956	Withdrew after qualifying							
(Italy) 1960 to (Canada) 1976	Not an IOC member							
(Soviet Union) 1980 to (United States) 1984	Did not qualify							
(South Korea) 1988	First round	14	3	0	1	2	0	5
Total	3/25	-	5	0	1	4	0	11

For 1992 to 2016, see China national under-23 football team

=== Asian Games ===
Year	Result	Rank	Pld	W	D	L	GF	GA
(India) 1951	Did not enter							
1954	Did not enter							
(Japan) 1958	Did not enter							
1962	Did not enter							
1966	Did not enter							
1970	Did not enter							
(Iran) 1974	First round	10	3	1	0	2	7	4
(Thailand) 1978	Third place	3	7	5	0	2	16	5
(India) 1982	Quarter-finals	7	4	2	1	1	4	3
(South Korea) 1986	Quarter-finals	8	4	2	1	1	10	7
(China) 1990	Quarter-finals	6	4	2	0	2	8	4
(Japan) 1994	Runners-up	2	7	5	1	1	16	8
(Thailand) 1998	Third place	3	8	6	0	2	24	7
Total*	7/13	-	37	23	3	11	85	38

* Including 1998 onwards (until 2010)

For 2002 to 2018, see China national under-23 football team

=== EAFF East Asian Cup ===
Year	Result	Pos	Pld	W	D*	L	GF	GA
(Japan) 2003	Third place	3	3	1	0	2	3	4
(South Korea) 2005	Champions	1	3	1	2	0	5	3
(China) 2008	Third place	3	3	1	0	2	5	5
(Japan) 2010	Champions	1	3	2	1	0	5	0
(South Korea) 2013	Runners-up	2	3	1	2	0	7	6
(China) 2015	Runners-up	2	3	1	1	1	3	3
(Japan) 2017	Third place	3	3	0	2	1	4	5
(South Korea) 2019	Third place	3	3	1	0	2	3	3
Total		-	24	8	8	8	35	29

== Head-to-head record ==
The China national football team has played over 500 matches with the teams of other nations from around the world, and has won approximately half of them.

As of 6 October 2026, Counted for the FIFA A-level match only.

Nations	First Played	P	W	D	L	GF	GA	GD	Confederation
Afghanistan	1984	1	1	0	0	6	0	+6	AFC
Albania	1973	1	0	1	0	1	1	0	UEFA
Algeria	2004	1	1	0	0	1	0	+1	CAF
Andorra	2004	1	0	1	0	0	0	0	UEFA
Argentina	1984	1	1	0	0	1	0	+1	CONMEBOL
Australia	1983	17	5	3	9	23	32	-9	AFC
Bahrain	1986	9	5	4	0	16	8	+8	AFC
Bangladesh	1980	5	5	0	0	15	0	+15	AFC
Bosnia and Herzegovina	1997	1	1	0	0	3	0	+3	UEFA
Botswana	2009	1	1	0	0	4	1	+3	CAF
Brazil	2002	3	0	1	2	0	12	-12	CONMEBOL
Brunei	1975	3	3	0	0	22	1	+21	AFC
Bhutan	2015	2	2	0	0	18	0	+18	AFC
Cambodia	1963	6	6	0	0	24	3	+21	AFC
Cameroon	2026	1	0	0	1	0	2	–2	AFC
Canada	1984	3	2	0	1	8	7	+1	CONCACAF
Chile	2003	1	0	1	0	0	0	0	CONMEBOL
Colombia	1995	2	1	0	1	2	5	−3	CONMEBOL
DR Congo	1977	1	1	0	0	3	2	+1	CAF
Costa Rica	2002	5	1	2	2	6	8	-2	CONCACAF
Croatia	2017	1	0	1	0	1	1	0	UEFA
Cuba	1971	1	1	0	0	1	0	+1	CONCACAF
Curaçao	2026	1	1	0	0	2	0	+2	CONCACAF
Czech Republic	2018	1	0	0	1	1	4	-3	UEFA
Egypt	1963	2	0	1	1	0	2	-2	CAF
El Salvador	2008	1	0	1	0	2	2	0	CONCACAF
England	1996	1	0	0	1	0	3	-3	UEFA
Estonia	2003	2	2	0	0	4	0	+4	UEFA
Fiji	1975	1	1	0	0	4	1	+3	OFC
Finland	1952	4	3	0	1	6	7	-1	UEFA
France	2006	2	1	0	1	2	3	-1	UEFA
Germany	2005	2	0	1	1	1	2	-1	UEFA
Ghana	2012	1	0	1	0	1	1	0	CAF
Guam	2000	3	3	0	0	33	0	+33	AFC
Guinea	1965	3	2	1	0	8	3	+5	CAF
Haiti	2003	2	0	1	1	5	6	-1	CONCACAF
Honduras	2006	3	1	1	1	3	1	+2	CONCACAF
Hong Kong	1975	28	19	7	2	49	7	+42	AFC
Hungary	2004	1	1	0	0	2	1	+1	UEFA
Iceland	2017	1	0	0	1	0	2	-2	UEFA
India	1956	14	8	5	1	24	7	+17	AFC
Indonesia	1957	19	12	3	4	44	16	+28	AFC
Iran	1976	25	5	7	13	21	43	-22	AFC
Iraq	1976	19	7	3	9	19	19	0	AFC
Italy	1986	1	0	0	1	0	2	-2	UEFA
Jamaica	1977	3	3	0	0	5	0	+5	CONCACAF
Japan	1975	39	12	9	18	53	57	-4	AFC
Jordan	1984	12	6	5	1	25	9	+16	AFC
Kazakhstan	1997	3	2	0	1	5	2	+3	UEFA
Kenya	1984	1	0	0	1	0	1	-1	CAF
North Korea	1959	21	10	6	5	28	19	+9	AFC
South Korea	1978	39	2	13	24	26	59	-33	AFC
Kuwait	1975	18	8	5	5	23	16	+7	AFC
Kyrgyzstan	2009	2	2	0	0	5	1	+4	AFC
Laos	2011	2	2	0	0	13	3	+10	AFC
Latvia	2010	1	1	0	0	1	0	+1	UEFA
Lebanon	1998	6	4	2	0	13	1	+12	AFC
Macau	1978	6	6	0	0	25	3	+22	AFC
Macedonia	2004	5	3	2	0	4	0	+4	UEFA
Malaysia	1976	15	10	4	1	35	8	+27	AFC
Maldives	2001	7	7	0	0	31	1	+30	AFC
Mali	1966	2	1	0	1	5	3	+2	CAF
Mexico	1987	3	0	0	3	2	7	-5	CONCACAF
Morocco	1977	2	1	1	0	6	5	+1	CAF
Myanmar	1957	11	9	0	2	35	4	+31	AFC
Nepal	1972	4	4	0	0	31	2	+29	AFC
Netherlands	1996	2	0	0	2	0	4	-4	UEFA
New Zealand	1975	17	3	6	8	14	20	-6	OFC
North Macedonia	2004	5	3	2	0	4	0	+4	UEFA
Norway	1992	1	1	0	0	2	1	+1	UEFA
Oman	1998	10	4	1	5	15	13	+2	AFC
Pakistan	1963	9	5	2	2	23	10	+13	AFC
Palestine	2006	8	5	2	1	17	7	+10	AFC
Papua New Guinea	1985	2	1	1	0	5	2	+3	OFC
Paraguay	1996	3	1	1	1	3	4	-1	CONMEBOL
Peru	1978	2	1	0	1	4	3	+1	CONMEBOL
Philippines	1978	13	12	1	0	50	3	+47	AFC
Poland	1984	2	0	0	2	0	2	-2	UEFA
Portugal	2002	1	0	0	1	0	2	-2	UEFA
Qatar	1978	21	9	5	7	24	17	+7	AFC
Republic of Ireland	1984	2	0	0	2	0	2	-2	UEFA
Romania	1984	3	1	0	2	3	5	-2	UEFA
Russia (Note: Includes Soviet Union)	1959	1	0	0	1	0	1	-1	UEFA
Saudi Arabia	1978	22	7	5	10	25	29	-4	AFC
Senegal	1972	2	1	1	0	5	2	+3	CAF
Serbia	2000	5	0	0	5	0	11	-11	UEFA
Sierra Leone	1974	1	1	0	0	4	1	+3	CAF
Singapore	1984	19	13	4	2	40	12	+28	AFC
Slovenia	2002	1	0	1	0	0	0	0	UEFA
Somalia	1972	2	2	0	0	10	5	+5	CAF
Soviet Union	1959	1	0	0	1	0	1	-1	UEFA
South Yemen	1972	2	2	0	0	10	7	+3	AFC
Spain	2005	2	0	0	2	0	4	-4	UEFA
Sri Lanka	1972	2	2	0	0	10	0	+10	AFC
Sudan	1957	1	1	0	0	4	1	+3	CAF
Sweden	2001	3	0	1	2	2	6	-4	UEFA
Switzerland	2006	1	0	0	1	1	4	-3	UEFA
Syria	1966	15	8	2	5	29	14	+15	AFC
Tajikistan	1997	7	4	2	1	9	2	+7	AFC
Tanzania	1966	3	2	1	0	15	8	+7	CAF
Thailand	1975	33	21	6	6	72	25	+47	AFC
Trinidad and Tobago	2001	2	2	0	0	7	2	+5	CONCACAF
Tunisia	2015	2	0	2	0	1	1	0	CAF
Turkey	2002	2	0	0	2	0	7	-7	UEFA
Turkmenistan	1994	4	3	1	0	10	3	+7	AFC
United Arab Emirates	1984	11	4	5	2	16	8	+8	AFC
United States	1977	9	2	2	5	10	19	-9	CONCACAF
Uruguay	1982	6	1	2	3	2	9	-7	CONMEBOL
Uzbekistan	1994	15	5	2	8	17	23	-6	AFC
Venezuela	1978	1	1	0	0	1	0	+1	CONMEBOL
Vietnam	1997	12	11	0	1	33	11	+22	AFC
Wales	2018	1	0	0	1	0	6	-6	UEFA
Yemen	1988	5	3	1	1	11	1	+10	AFC
Zambia	1972	1	0	1	0	3	3	0	CAF
Zimbabwe	1997	1	1	0	0	3	1	+2	CAF
Total	1956	701	338	148	215	1,277	727	+550	All

== Sources ==
- Fixtures and Results on FIFA.com
- Team China Official Website (in Chinese)
- China International Matches on RSSSF
- China Matches on Elo Ratings
