= Vietnam at the AFC Asian Cup =

Teams representing Vietnam in AFC Asian Cups

National football teams from Vietnam has qualified for five AFC Asian Cups so far:

- In 1956, 1960 as South Vietnam (represent Republic of Vietnam)
- In 2007, 2019 and 2023 as Vietnam (represent Socialist Republic of Vietnam)

With the establishment of the AFC Asian Cup in 1956, the Republic of Vietnam (South Vietnam), had made its first appearances in the two maiden 1956 and 1960 editions, since South Vietnam team was a member of FIFA in contrast to the national team of the Democratic Republic of Vietnam (North Vietnam). South Vietnam won fourth place in both editions. By the end of the Vietnam War however, this would be Vietnam's only appearances in the AFC Asian Cup for 47 years, due to the country's total destruction aftermath and subsequent conflicts between Vietnam and its neighbours. This had a serious impact and weakened Vietnam from a football powerhouse into one of Asia's weakest teams.

After returning to football in the 1990s, Vietnam did not participate in the Asian Cup for 11 consecutive editions before being selected as host in 2007 together with Thailand, Indonesia and Malaysia. Despite these 47 years of failing to qualify, Vietnam surprised the continent in 2007 with a 2–0 victory over the UAE, a draw with Qatar and in spite of losing 1–4 to Asia's giant Japan, Vietnam qualified to the quarter-finals while three other co-hosts failed to do so, before losing to eventual champions Iraq.

However, after the dramatic run in 2007, Vietnam failed to qualify again for the 2011 and 2015 editions, before finally returning in the 2019 AFC Asian Cup. With the recent rise of Vietnamese football on the international stage, such as the participation of the futsal and U-20 team in the 2016 FIFA Futsal World Cup and 2017 FIFA U-20 World Cup; especially the Olympic team, which won the silver medal in the 2018 AFC U-23 Championship, Vietnam was expected to shine in the 2019 Asian Cup despite being positioned with so many hard and difficult opponents. Vietnam then reached the quarter-finals.

== South Vietnam ==
=== 1956 Asian Cup ===
South Vietnam participated in the inaugural edition of the Asian Cup, having edged Malaya in a 7–3 aggregate qualification, together with three other teams, host Hong Kong, South Korea and Israel. It would be Vietnam's debut in the Asian Cup.

Pos	Team	Pld	W	D	L	GF	GA	GD	Pts	Qualification
1	South Korea	3	2	1	0	9	6	+3	5	Champions
2	Israel	3	2	0	1	6	5	+1	4	Runners-up
3	Hong Kong (H)	3	0	2	1	6	7	−1	2	Third place
4	South Vietnam	3	0	1	2	6	9	−3	1	Fourth place

Source: RSSSF
(H) Hosts

In the opening match against host Hong Kong, then-Asia's top teams, South Vietnam could manage only a 2–2 draw over the host.

9 September 1956
19:00

South Vietnam	2–2	Hong Kong
Trần Văn Nhung 30'; Lê Hữu Đức 65'	Report	Chu Wing Wah 59' (pen.); Lau Chi Lam 79'

Government Stadium, Hong Kong
Attendance: 20,000
Referee: Sung Hee-do (South Korea)

In the second game, South Vietnam would have been edged, but not without putting a good fight towards Israel, in a 1–2 defeat.

12 September 1956
19:00

Israel	2–1	South Vietnam
Stelmach 16', 28'	Report	Trần Văn Nhung 58'

Government Stadium, Hong Kong
Attendance: 10,000
Referee: Richard Tucker (Hong Kong)

In the last match, South Vietnam and South Korea created a thriller, which ended with the 5–3 victory for the Koreans. Eventually, South Vietnam won fourth place for the first time, and also their best result to date.

15 September 1956
19:00

South Korea	5–3	South Vietnam
Sung Nak-woon 5'; Woo Sang-kwon 46' (pen.), 58'; Choi Jung-min 56', 66'	Report	Nguyễn Văn Cụt 20'; Lê Hữu Đức 50', 62'

Government Stadium, Hong Kong
Attendance: 13,000
Referee: Fred Minta (Hong Kong)

=== 1960 Asian Cup ===
South Vietnam would have made their second debut in the tournament, after successfully edged Singapore and Malaya in the qualification round. In there, they once again faced South Korea and Israel, with debutant Republic of China. It would be a more disappointing performance than four years ago, as South Vietnam were all defeated in three matches, especially losing 1–5 to both South Korea and Israel. South Vietnam won fourth place twice, and it would have remained as Vietnam's only two appearances in the Asian Cup for the next 47 years.

Pos	Team	Pld	W	D	L	GF	GA	GD	Pts	Qualification
1	South Korea (H)	3	3	0	0	9	1	+8	6	Champions
2	Israel	3	2	0	1	6	4	+2	4	Runners-up
3	Taiwan	3	1	0	2	2	2	0	2	Third place
4	South Vietnam	3	0	0	3	2	12	−10	0	Fourth place

Source: RSSSF
(H) Hosts
14 October 1960
15:15

South Korea	5–1	South Vietnam
Cho Yoon-ok 15', 71'; Woo Sang-kwon 27'; Choi Chung-min 47'; Moon Jung-sik 56'	Report	Nguyễn Văn Tư 70'

Hyochang Stadium, Seoul
Attendance: 30,000
Referee: Haji Ibrahim bin Annuar (Malaya)
16 October 1960
15:00

Taiwan	2–0	South Vietnam
Luk Man Wai 51'; Yiu Cheuk Yin 70'	Report

Hyochang Stadium, Seoul
Attendance: 30,000
Referee: Sumio Hayakawa (Japan)
19 October 1960
15:00

South Vietnam	1–5	Israel
Trần Văn Nhung 65' (pen.)	Report	R. Levi 13'; Stelmach 18'; S. Levi 25'; Menchel 32'; Aharonskind 70'

Hyochang Stadium, Seoul
Attendance: 15,000
Referee: Luis Javellana (Philippines)

Since then, due to the later Vietnam War and subsequent conflicts, Vietnam could not play any big tournament for the next 47 years, before returning to international stage in 2007.

== Socialist Republic of Vietnam ==
=== 2007 Asian Cup ===
In 2004, Vietnam, together with Indonesia, Malaysia and Thailand were awarded as hosts for the 2007 AFC Asian Cup, signalled the return of a national team from Vietnam after 47 years. However, Vietnam was pushed into a tough group, consisting three champions: Japan, then-Asian champions; the United Arab Emirates, then-Gulf champions and Qatar, with the squad mostly made up from 2006 Asian Games in which Qatar won the gold medal. Being in a tough group, Vietnam was not expected to pass through nor even having a point, but rather just a point basket for these teams.

Nonetheless, under Austrian manager Alfred Riedl, Vietnam stunned all predictions. In the opening account, Vietnam surprised by defeating Gulf champions UAE, before drew another Gulf team, Qatar. Although losing the final match against Japan, Vietnam wrote history as the only host to qualify for the tournament's quarter-finals while Thailand, Indonesia and Malaysia failed to do so. However, Vietnam would have to end their fairytale after being defeated by latter champion Iraq. It remains as Vietnam's best performance ever since the reunification of Vietnam.

==== Group stage ====
Pos	Team	Pld	W	D	L	GF	GA	GD	Pts	Qualification
1	Japan	3	2	1	0	8	3	+5	7	Advance to knockout stage
2	Vietnam (H)	3	1	1	1	4	5	−1	4	Advance to knockout stage
3	United Arab Emirates	3	1	0	2	3	6	−3	3	
4	Qatar	3	0	2	1	3	4	−1	2	

Source: AFC
Rules for classification: Tiebreakers
(H) Hosts
8 July 2007
19:30 UTC+7

Vietnam	2–0	United Arab Emirates
Huỳnh Quang Thanh 64'; Lê Công Vinh 73'	Report

Mỹ Đình Stadium, Hanoi
Attendance: 39,450
Referee: Talaat Najm (Lebanon)
12 July 2007
19:30 UTC+7

Qatar	1–1	Vietnam
Soria 79'	Report	Phan Thanh Bình 32'

Mỹ Đình Stadium, Hanoi
Attendance: 40,000
Referee: Masoud Moradi (Iran)
16 July 2007
17:15 UTC+7

Vietnam	1–4	Japan
Suzuki 8' (o.g.)	Report	Maki 12', 59'; Endō 31'; S. Nakamura 53'

Mỹ Đình Stadium, Hanoi
Attendance: 40,000
Referee: Matthew Breeze (Australia)

==== Knockout stage ====
===== Quarter-finals =====
21 July 2007
20:15 UTC+7

Iraq	2–0	Vietnam
Mahmoud 2', 65'	Report

Rajamangala Stadium, Bangkok
Attendance: 9,720
Referee: Yuichi Nishimura (Japan)

=== 2019 Asian Cup ===
Vietnam would have to wait for another twelve years to return for the AFC Asian Cup, this time to be hosted in the UAE. By then, Vietnam was placed with strong opponents, including two former Asian champions, Iran and Iraq, with the unknown debutant Yemen. This is the third time Vietnam was drawn with Asia's no. 1 team, this time is Iran, after having drawn with South Korea in two inaugural editions, and Japan in 2007 editions.

Although Vietnam showed a great effort in the first two matches, the young team could not get any point. In the last match against Yemen, Quang Hai scored a goal before Ngoc Hai secured a win for Vietnam by a successful penalty kick. Vietnam had to wait until the last match of the group stage between Lebanon and North Korea to see the team can go to the knock-out stage. Vietnam and Lebanon finished their matches with their same statistics. However, Vietnam was the last team to enter Round of 16 by having a higher discipline score (Vietnam −5, Lebanon −7). This is the second time Vietnam qualified for the knock-out stage.

Vietnam was considered as the underdogs when facing Jordan in the Round of 16. Jordan did not concede any goal in the group stage after two wins against the defending champion Australia and Syria, and a draw with Palestine after already qualified to the knock-out stage as group winner. However, Jordan decided to play defensively and Vietnam dominated the match. After 120 minutes, the score was 1–1. Vietnam won the match after the penalty shootout and qualified to the quarterfinals.

Vietnam faced Japan, the most successful team at the Asian Cup, in the quarterfinals. It was the first match ever of the Asian Cup history using VAR. Japan was denied a goal in the first half and awarded a penalty in the second half – which was converted into the only goal of the match.

==== Group stage ====
Pos	Team	Pld	W	D	L	GF	GA	GD	Pts	Qualification
1	Iran	3	2	1	0	7	0	+7	7	Advance to knockout stage
2	Iraq	3	2	1	0	6	2	+4	7	Advance to knockout stage
3	Vietnam	3	1	0	2	4	5	−1	3	Advance to knockout stage
4	Yemen	3	0	0	3	0	10	−10	0	

Source: AFC
8 January 2019
17:30

Iraq	3–2	Vietnam
M. Ali 35'; Tariq 60'; Adnan 90'	Report	Faez 24' (o.g.); Nguyễn Công Phượng 42'

Zayed Sports City Stadium, Abu Dhabi
Attendance: 4,779
Referee: Abdulrahman Al-Jassim (Qatar)
12 January 2019
15:00

Vietnam	0–2	Iran
	Report	Azmoun 38', 69'

Al Nahyan Stadium, Abu Dhabi
Attendance: 10,841
Referee: Muhammad Taqi (Singapore)
16 January 2019
20:00

Vietnam	2–0	Yemen
Nguyễn Quang Hải 38'; Quế Ngọc Hải 64' (pen.)	Report

Hazza bin Zayed Stadium, Al Ain
Attendance: 8,237
Referee: Ahmed Al-Kaf (Oman)

==== Knockout stage ====
===== Round of 16 =====
20 January 2019
15:00

Jordan	1–1 (a.e.t.)	Vietnam
Abdel-Rahman 39'	Report	Nguyễn Công Phượng 51'
Penalties
Abdel-Rahman (penalty scored); Faisal (penalty missed); Samir (penalty missed); Ersan (penalty scored)	2–4	(penalty scored) Quế Ngọc Hải; (penalty scored) Đỗ Hùng Dũng; (penalty scored) Lương Xuân Trường; (penalty missed) Trần Minh Vương; (penalty scored) Bùi Tiến Dũng I

Al Maktoum Stadium, Dubai
Attendance: 14,205
Referee: Alireza Faghani (Iran)

===== Quarter-finals =====
24 January 2019
17:00

Vietnam	0–1	Japan
	Report	Doan 57' (pen.)

Al Maktoum Stadium, Dubai
Attendance: 8,954
Referee: Mohammed Abdulla Hassan Mohamed (United Arab Emirates)

=== 2023 Asian Cup ===
In June 2021, Vietnam officially advanced into the third round of the 2022 World Cup qualifiers, which also automatically qualified the team to the 2023 AFC Asian Cup .

In the third Asian Cup since the country's reunification, Vietnam was grouped with Japan, Iraq and Indonesia in Group D. At the dawn of the tournament, the team left with many doubts due to the absence of key players like Đặng Văn Lâm, Đoàn Văn Hậu, Quế Ngọc Hải or Nguyễn Tiến Linh due to injuries. The Golden Star Warriors were then forced to deal with a talented but inexperienced squad with an average age of 25. New hard blows were then added with the forfeit of Nguyễn Hoàng Đức, 2021 Vietnamese Golden Ball, who also failed to recover from his injury.

==== Group stage ====
Pos	Team	Pld	W	D	L	GF	GA	GD	Pts	Qualification
1	Iraq	3	3	0	0	8	4	+4	9	Advance to knockout stage
2	Japan	3	2	0	1	8	5	+3	6	Advance to knockout stage
3	Indonesia	3	1	0	2	3	6	−3	3	Advance to knockout stage
4	Vietnam	3	0	0	3	4	8	−4	0	

Source: AFC
14 January 2024
14:30

Japan	4–2	Vietnam
Minamino 11', 45'; Nakamura 45+4'; Ueda 85'	Report	Nguyễn Đình Bắc 16'; Phạm Tuấn Hải 33'

Al Thumama Stadium, Doha
Attendance: 17,385
Referee: Kim Jong-hyeok (South Korea)

19 January 2024
17:30

Vietnam	0–1	Indonesia
	Report	Asnawi 42' (pen.)

Abdullah bin Khalifa Stadium, Doha
Attendance: 7,253
Referee: Sadullo Gulmurodi (Tajikistan)

24 January 2024
14:30

Iraq	3–2	Vietnam
Sulaka 47'; Hussein 73', 90+12' (pen.)	Report	Bùi Hoàng Việt Anh 42'; Nguyễn Quang Hải 90+1'

Jassim bin Hamad Stadium, Al Rayyan
Attendance: 8,932
Referee: Nazmi Nasaruddin (Malaysia)

=== 2027 Asian Cup ===
==== Group stage ====
Pos	Team	Pld	W	D	L	GF	GA	GD	Pts	Qualification
1	South Korea	0	0	0	0	0	0	0	0	Advance to knockout stage
2	United Arab Emirates	0	0	0	0	0	0	0	0	Advance to knockout stage
3	Vietnam	0	0	0	0	0	0	0	0	Possible knockout stage based on ranking
4	Yemen	0	0	0	0	0	0	0	0	

First match(es) will be played: January 2027. Source: AFC

== Overview ==
=== As South Vietnam ===
AFC Asian Cup record									AFC Asian Cup qualification					
Year	Result	Pos.	Pld	W	D	L	GF	GA	Pld	W	D	L	GF	GA
1956	Fourth Place	4/4	3	0	1	2	6	9	2	1	1	0	7	3
1960	Fourth Place	4/4	3	0	0	3	2	12	2	2	0	0	5	1
1964	Did not qualify								3	2	0	1	9	7
1968	Did not qualify								4	2	0	2	4	4
1972	Withdrew								Withdrew					
1976	Did not qualify								4	0	0	4	1	10
Total	Best: Fourth place	2/6	6	0	1	5	8	21	15	7	1	7	26	25

=== Record by opponent ===
AFC Asian Cup matches (by team)
Opponent	Pld	W	D	L	GF	GA	GD
Hong Kong	1	0	1	0	2	2	0
Israel	2	0	0	2	2	7	–5
Taiwan	1	0	0	1	0	2	–2
South Korea	2	0	0	2	4	10	–6

=== As Vietnam ===
AFC Asian Cup record									AFC Asian Cup qualification					
Year	Result	Pos.	Pld	W	D	L	GF	GA	Pld	W	D	L	GF	GA
1980 to 1992	Did not enter								Did not enter					
1996	Did not qualify								3	2	0	1	13	5
2000	Did not qualify								3	2	0	1	14	2
2004	Did not qualify								6	3	0	3	8	13
2007	Quarter-finals	8/16	4	1	1	2	4	7	Host					
2011	Did not qualify								6	1	2	3	6	11
2015	Did not qualify								6	1	0	5	5	15
2019	Quarter-finals	8/24	5	1	1	3	5	7	12	4	5	3	16	11
(Qatar) 2023	Group Stage	22/24	3	0	0	3	4	8	8	5	2	1	13	5
Total	Best: Quarter-finals	3/13	12	2	2	8	13	22	44	18	9	19	70	62

=== Record by opponent ===
AFC Asian Cup matches (by team)
Opponent	Pld	W	D	L	GF	GA	GD
Indonesia	1	0	0	1	0	1	–1
Iran	1	0	0	1	0	2	–2
Iraq	3	0	0	3	4	8	–4
Japan	3	0	0	3	3	9	–6
Jordan	1	0	1	0	1	1	0
Qatar	1	0	1	0	1	1	0
United Arab Emirates	1	1	0	0	2	0	+2
Yemen	1	1	0	0	2	0	+2

== Top goalscorers ==
South Vietnam goalscorers
Player	Goals
(South Vietnam) Trần Văn Nhung	3
(South Vietnam) Lê Hữu Đức	3
(South Vietnam) Nguyễn Văn Cụt	1
(South Vietnam) Nguyễn Văn Tư	1

Vietnam goalscorers
Player	Goals	Editions played
Nguyễn Công Phượng	2	2019
Nguyễn Quang Hải	2	2019, 2023
Huỳnh Quang Thanh	1	2007
Lê Công Vinh	1	2007
Phan Thanh Bình	1	2007
Quế Ngọc Hải	1	2019
Nguyễn Đình Bắc	1	2023
Phạm Tuấn Hải	1	2023
Bùi Hoàng Việt Anh	1	2023
