= Hong Kong national football team results (1954–1969) =

- Win Draw Loss

This is a list of the Hong Kong national football team results from 1954 to 1969.

== 1954 ==
2 May 1954 Asian Games; Group D	South Korea	3–3	Hong Kong	Manila, Philippines
	Park Il-gap 20'; Chung Gook-jin 64'; Sung Nak-woon 78'		Chu Wing Wah 2'; Lo Keng Chuen 63'; Lee Yuk Tak 76'	Stadium: Rizal Memorial Stadium

6 May 1954 Asian Games; Group D	Hong Kong	4–2	Afghanistan	Manila, Philippines
				Stadium: Rizal Memorial Stadium

== 1956 ==
1 September 1956 AFC Asian Cup; Group Stage	Hong Kong	2–3	Israel	So Kon Po, British Hong Kong
19:00 UTC+8	Au Chi Yin 12', 66'		Glazer 37', 76'; Stelmach 69'	Stadium: Government Stadium; Attendance: 30,000; Referee: H.A. Sheppard (England)

6 September 1956 AFC Asian Cup; Group Stage	Hong Kong	2–2	South Korea	So Kon Po, British Hong Kong
19:00 UTC+8	Tang Yee Kit 10'; Ko Po Keung 39'		Kim Ji-sung 45'; Choi Kwang-seok 62'	Stadium: Government Stadium; Attendance: 30,000

9 September 1956 AFC Asian Cup; Group Stage	Hong Kong	2–2	South Vietnam	So Kon Po, British Hong Kong
19:00 UTC+8	Chu Wing Wah 59' (pen.); Lau Chi Lam 79'		Trần Văn Tổng 30'; Lê Hữu Đức 64'	Stadium: Government Stadium; Attendance: 30,000

== 1958 ==
18 February International friendly	Hong Kong	3–2	South Korea	British Hong Kong

25 May 1958 Asian Games; Group C	Hong Kong	4–1	Philippines	Tokyo, Japan

28 May 1958 Asian Games; Group C	Japan	0–2	Hong Kong	Tokyo, Japan
				Stadium: National Stadium

30 May 1958 Asian Games; Quarter-finals	India	5–2	Hong Kong	Tokyo, Japan

== 1959 ==
29 March 1960 AFC Asian Cup; Qualification Eastern Zone	Philippines	0–7	Hong Kong	Manila, Philippines
			Lau Chi Lam; Ho Cheung Yau; Lau Kai Cheung; Leung Wai Hung	Stadium: Rizal Memorial Stadium; Attendance: 10,000

== 1960 ==
No any official matches were played in 1960.

== 1961 ==
2 December International friendly	Hong Kong	1–2	Yugoslavia	So Kon Po, British Hong Kong
	Kwok Mun Won 86'	Report	Mujić 40'; Bego 60'	Stadium: Government Stadium; Attendance: 30,000; Referee: Tat Sun Luk (Hong Kong)

== 1962 ==
No any official matches were played in 1962.

== 1963 ==
7 December 1964 AFC Asian Cup; Qualification Central Zone	Hong Kong	3–3	Thailand	Saigon, South Vietnam
				Stadium: Cong Hoa Stadium

11 December 1964 AFC Asian Cup; Qualification Central Zone	South Vietnam	1–4	Hong Kong	Saigon, South Vietnam
				Stadium: Cong Hoa Stadium

14 December 1964 AFC Asian Cup; Qualification Central Zone	Hong Kong	4–3	Malaysia	Saigon, South Vietnam
				Stadium: Cong Hoa Stadium

== 1964 ==
2 January International friendly	Hong Kong	0–3	Israel	So Kon Po, British Hong Kong
		https://eu-football.info/_match.php?id=24784 Report]	Mahalal 7', 72'; Spiegler 43' (pen.)	Stadium: Government Stadium; Attendance: 10,000; Referee: Fred Pratlett (Hong Kong)

26 May 1964 AFC Asian Cup; Group Stage	Israel	1–0	Hong Kong	Ramat Gan, Israel
16:30 UTC+2	Spiegler 76'	Report		Stadium: Ramat Gan Stadium; Attendance: 25,000; Referee: Patrick Nice (Malaysia)

31 May 1964 AFC Asian Cup; Group Stage	South Korea	1–0	Hong Kong	Jerusalem, Israel
16:30 UTC+2	Bae Keum-soo 74'			Stadium: Hebrew University Stadium; Attendance: 7,000; Referee: Pisit Ngarampanich (Thailand)

2 June 1964 AFC Asian Cup; Group Stage	India	3–1	Hong Kong	Tel Aviv, Israel
16:30 UTC+2	I. Singh 45'; Samajapati 60'; Goswami 77'		Cheung Yiu Kwok 39'	Stadium: Bloomfield Stadium; Attendance: 5,000; Referee: Patrick Nice (Malaysia)

== 1965 ==
11 March International friendly	Hong Kong	1–4	Japan	So Kon Po, British Hong Kong
				Stadium: Government Stadium; Attendance: 25,737

15 March International friendly	Hong Kong	1–2	Japan	So Kon Po, British Hong Kong
				Stadium: Government Stadium; Attendance: 25,000

15 August 1965 Merdeka Tournament; Allocation Match	Hong Kong	2–4	Burma	Kuala Lumpur, Malaysia

17 August 1965 Merdeka Tournament; Group A	South Vietnam	2–1	Hong Kong	Kuala Lumpur, Malaysia

19 August 1965 Merdeka Tournament; Group A	India	2–2	Hong Kong	Kuala Lumpur, Malaysia

23 August 1965 Merdeka Tournament; Group A	Malaysia	1–3	Hong Kong	Kuala Lumpur, Malaysia

25 August 1965 Merdeka Tournament; Group A	South Korea	1–0	Hong Kong	Kuala Lumpur, Malaysia

27 August 1965 Merdeka Tournament; 7th Place Match	Thailand	1–1	Hong Kong	Kuala Lumpur, Malaysia

29 November International friendly	Hong Kong	1–0	Australia	So Kon Po, British Hong Kong
	McLaren 22'			Stadium: Government Stadium; Attendance: 8,780

== 1966 ==
14 August 1966 Merdeka Tournament; Allocation Match	India	2–0	Hong Kong	Kuala Lumpur, Malaysia

17 August 1966 Merdeka Tournament; Group 2	Malaysia	1–0	Hong Kong	Kuala Lumpur, Malaysia

19 August 1966 Merdeka Tournament; Group 2	South Korea	1–0	Hong Kong	Kuala Lumpur, Malaysia

23 August 1966 Merdeka Tournament; Group 2	Thailand	2–2	Hong Kong	Kuala Lumpur, Malaysia

25 August 1966 Merdeka Tournament; Group 2	Hong Kong	0–2	Burma	Kuala Lumpur, Malaysia

== 1967 ==
22 March 1968 AFC Asian Cup; Qualification Central Zone	Hong Kong	2–0	South Vietnam	British Hong Kong

26 March 1968 AFC Asian Cup; Qualification Central Zone	Hong Kong	3–1	Malaysia	British Hong Kong

29 March 1968 AFC Asian Cup; Qualification Central Zone	Hong Kong	2–0	Singapore	British Hong Kong

2 April 1968 AFC Asian Cup; Qualification Central Zone	Hong Kong	2–0	Thailand	British Hong Kong

10 August 1967 Merdeka Tournament; Group A	Thailand	0–1	Hong Kong	Kuala Lumpur, Malaysia

12 August 1967 Merdeka Tournament; Group A	South Vietnam	5–0	Hong Kong	Kuala Lumpur, Malaysia

13 August 1967 Merdeka Tournament; Group A	Malaysia	3–0	Hong Kong	Kuala Lumpur, Malaysia

16 August 1967 Merdeka Tournament; Group A	India	4–0	Hong Kong	Kuala Lumpur, Malaysia

23 August 1967 Merdeka Tournament; Loser Semi-finals	Indonesia	1–2	Hong Kong	Kuala Lumpur, Malaysia

25 August 1967 Merdeka Tournament; 5th Place Match	Taiwan	4–2	Hong Kong	Kuala Lumpur, Malaysia

6 November 1967 Quoc Khanh Cup; Group B	South Korea	1–0	Hong Kong	Saigon, South Vietnam

8 November 1967 Quoc Khanh Cup; Group B	Malaysia	2–0	Hong Kong	Saigon, South Vietnam

11 November 1967 Quoc Khanh Cup; Group B	Thailand	5–1	Hong Kong	Saigon, South Vietnam

== 1968 ==
10 May 1968 AFC Asian Cup; Group Stage	Burma	2–0	Hong Kong	Tehran, Iran
				Stadium: Amjadieh Stadium

12 May 1968 AFC Asian Cup; Group Stage	Israel	6–1	Hong Kong	Tehran, Iran
	Spiegler 9', 65'; Spiegel 52', 53'; Romano 61', 71'		Yuan Kuan Yick 76'	Stadium: Amjadieh Stadium; Attendance: 30,000; Referee: Batha Chaterchi (India)

14 May 1968 AFC Asian Cup; Group Stage	Iran	2–0	Hong Kong	Tehran, Iran
	Behzadi 70'; Jabbari 88'			Stadium: Amjadieh Stadium; Attendance: 28,000; Referee: Norman Boswell (Malaysia)

19 May 1968 AFC Asian Cup; Group Stage	Taiwan	1–1	Hong Kong	Tehran, Iran
				Stadium: Amjadieh Stadium

9 August 1968 Merdeka Tournament; Group B	Malaysia	1–1	Hong Kong	Kuala Lumpur, Malaysia

10 August 1968 Merdeka Tournament; Group B	Thailand	0–0	Hong Kong	Kuala Lumpur, Malaysia

12 August 1968 Merdeka Tournament; Group B	Hong Kong	0–3	Burma	Kuala Lumpur, Malaysia

14 August 1968 Merdeka Tournament; Group B	India	1–1	Hong Kong	Kuala Lumpur, Malaysia

16 August 1968 Merdeka Tournament; Group B	South Vietnam	3–1	Hong Kong	Kuala Lumpur, Malaysia

== 1969 ==
No matches were played in 1969.
