= Hong Kong national football team all-time record =

This page covers the record of the Hong Kong national football team in the FIFA World Cup and the AFC Asian Cup. In the "Results" section, (h), (a) and (n) indicate home, away and neutral.

== Major Tournaments ==
Tournament	Structure	Placing	Results	Notes
(Uruguay) 1930 FIFA World Cup	Did not enter			
(Italy) 1934 FIFA World Cup	Did not enter			
(France) 1938 FIFA World Cup	Did not enter			
(Brazil) 1950 FIFA World Cup	Did not enter			
(Switzerland) 1954 FIFA World Cup	Did not enter			
(Hong Kong) 1956 AFC Asian Cup	1 group of 4	3rd of 4; 2/6 points	Israel 2–3 (h); South Korea 2–2 (h); South Vietnam 2–2 (h)	Qualified as host
(Sweden) 1958 FIFA World Cup	Did not enter			
(South Korea) 1960 AFC Asian Cup qualification	1 group of 3	2nd of 3; 2/4 points	Philippines 7–0 (a); Taiwan 4–7 (n)	Did not qualify
(Chile) 1962 FIFA World Cup qualification	Did not enter			
(Israel) 1964 AFC Asian Cup qualification	1 group of 4	1st of 4; 5/6 points	Thailand 3–3 (n); South Vietnam 4–1 (a); Malaysia 4–3 (n)	Qualified
(Israel) 1964 AFC Asian Cup	1 group of 4	4th of 4; 0/6 points	Israel 0–1 (a); South Korea 0–1 (n); India 1–3 (n)	
(England) 1966 FIFA World Cup qualification	Did not enter			
(Iran) 1968 AFC Asian Cup qualification	Groups (2 groups of 4 and 1 group of 5)	1st of 5; 8/8 points	South Vietnam 2–0 (h); Malaysia 3–1 (h); Singapore 2–0 (h); Thailand 2–0 (h)	Qualified
(Iran) 1968 AFC Asian Cup	1 group of 5	5th of 5; 1/8 points	Iran 0–2 (a); Israel 1–6 (n); Taiwan 1–1 (n); Burma 0–2 (n)	
(Mexico) 1970 FIFA World Cup qualification	Did not enter			
(Thailand) 1972 AFC Asian Cup qualification	Groups (1 zone of 6 and 1 zone of 7; 2 groups of 3, then knockout)	Defeat in allocation match 3rd of 3; 0/4 points	Indonesia 1–2 (n); Khmer Republic 1–2 (n); Malaysia 1–2 (n)	Did not qualify
(West Germany) 1974 FIFA World Cup qualification	Groups (1 zone of 7 and 1 zone of 8; 1 group of 3 and 1 group of 4, then knockout)	Won in classification match 1st of 3; 4/4 points Defeat in zonal semi-Finals	Malaysia 1–0 (n); Japan 1–0 (n); South Vietnam 1–0 (n); South Korea 1–3 (a)	Did not qualify for Final Round
(Iran) 1976 AFC Asian Cup qualification	Groups (1 group of 4, 1 group of 5 and 1 group of 6; 2 subgroups of 3, then knockout)	Won in allocation match 2nd of 3; 2/4 points Defeat in semi-Finals and Third place play-off	Japan 0–0 (4–3 (p)) (h); Brunei 3–0 (h); China 0–1 (h); North Korea 3–3 (10–11 (p)) (h); Japan 0–1 (h)	Did not qualify
(Argentina) 1978 FIFA World Cup qualification	1st Round (4 groups of 3 and 1 group of 5, then play-off)	1st of 5; 6/8 points Won in play-off	Indonesia 4–1 (n); Singapore 2–2 (a), 1–0 (a); Thailand 2–1 (n); Malaysia 1–1 (n)	Did not qualify
(Argentina) 1978 FIFA World Cup qualification	Final Round (1 group of 5)	5th of 5; 0/16 points	Iran 0–2 (h), 0–3 (a); South Korea 0–1 (h), 2–5 (a); Kuwait 1–3 (h), 0–4 (a); Australia 2–5 (h), 0–3 (a)	Did not qualify
(Kuwait) 1980 AFC Asian Cup qualification	Groups (2 groups of 3, 1 groups of 4 and 1 group of 7; 1 subgroup of 3 and 1 subgroup of 4, then knockout)	Defeat in allocation match 2nd of 4; 4/6 points Defeat in semi-Finals; Won in Third place play-off	North Korea 0–3 (n); Thailand 0–1 (a); Singapore 3–1 (n); Sri Lanka 5–0 (n); Malaysia 0–0 (4–5 (p)) (n); Thailand 2–1 (a)	Did not qualify
(Spain) 1982 FIFA World Cup qualification	1st Round (1 group of 4, 2 groups of 5 and 1 group of 6; 2 subgroups of 3, then knockout)	2nd of 3; 2/6 points Defeat in zonal semi-Finals	China 0–1 (h); Singapore 1–1 (h); North Korea 2–2 (h); China 0–0 (4–5 (p)) (h)	Did not qualify for Final Round
(Singapore) 1984 AFC Asian Cup qualification	Groups (3 groups of 5 and 1 group of 6)	4th of 5; 2/8 points	China 0–2 (a); Qatar 0–1 (n); Jordan 1–1 (n); Afghanistan 0–0 (n)	Did not qualify
(Mexico) 1986 FIFA World Cup qualification	1st Round (1 zone of 10 and 1 zone of 14; 2 groups of 3 and 2 groups of 4)	1st of 4; 11/12 points	China 0–0 (h), 2–1 (a); Brunei 8–0 (h), 5–1 (a); Macau 2–0 (h), 2–0 (a)	Did not qualify for Final Round
(Mexico) 1986 FIFA World Cup qualification	2nd Round (knockout)	Defeat	Japan 1–2 (h), 0–3 (a)	Did not qualify for Final Round
(Qatar) 1988 AFC Asian Cup qualification	Groups (1 group of 4, 2 groups of 5 and 1 group of 6)	4th of 5; 1/8 points	North Korea 0–1 (n); Syria 0–2 (n); Iran 0–2 (n); Nepal 0–0 (a)	Did not qualify
(Italy) 1990 FIFA World Cup qualification	1st Round (5 groups of 4 and 1 group of 5)	4th of 4; 3/12 points	North Korea 1–2 (h), 1–4 (a); Indonesia 1–1 (h), 2–3 (a); Japan 0–0 (h), 0–0 (a)	Did not qualify for Final Round
(Japan) 1992 AFC Asian Cup qualification	Groups (4 groups of 3 and 2 groups of 4)	3rd of 4; 3/6 points	Macau 2–2 (n); North Korea 0–0 (a); Chinese Taipei 0–0 (n)	Did not qualify
(United States) 1994 FIFA World Cup qualification	1st Round (1 groups of 4 and 5 groups of 5)	4th of 5; 5/16 points	Bahrain 2–1 (n), 0–3 (n); Lebanon 2–2 (a), 1–2 (n); South Korea 0–3 (n), 1–4 (a); India 2–1 (n), 1–3 (a)	Did not qualify for Final Round
(United Arab Emirates) 1996 AFC Asian Cup qualification	Groups (1 group of 2, 5 groups of 3 and 4 groups of 4)	2nd of 4; 6/9 points	China 0–2 (h); Macau 4–1 (h); Philippines 8–0 (h)	Did not qualify
(France) 1998 FIFA World Cup qualification	1st Round (4 groups of 3 and 6 groups of 4)	3rd of 3; 3/12 points	South Korea 0–2 (h), 0–4 (a); Thailand 3–2 (h), 0–2 (a)	Did not qualify for Final Round
(Lebanon) 2000 AFC Asian Cup qualification	Groups (1 group of 3, 6 groups of 4 and 3 groups of 5)	2nd of 3; 7/12 points	Indonesia 1–1 (h), 1–3 (a); Cambodia 4–1 (h), 1–0 (a)	Did not qualify
(South Korea) (Japan) 2002 FIFA World Cup qualification	1st Round (1 group of 3 and groups of 4)	4th of 4; 4/18 points	Qatar 0–2 (h), 0–3 (a); Palestine 1–1 (h), 0–1 (n); Malaysia 0–2 (h), 2–1 (n)	Did not qualify for 2nd Round
(China) 2004 AFC Asian Cup qualification	Preliminary Round (1 group of 2 and 6 groups of 3)	1st of 3; 4/6 points	Laos 5–1 (h); Bangladesh 2–2 (h)	Did not qualify
(China) 2004 AFC Asian Cup qualification	Qualifying Round (7 groups of 4)	4th of 4; 4/18 points	Uzbekistan 1–4 (a), 0–1 (n); Thailand 2–1 (n), 0–4 (a); Tajikistan 0–0 (n), 0–1 (n)	Did not qualify
(Germany) 2006 FIFA World Cup qualification	1st Round	Bye		Did not qualify for 3rd Round
(Germany) 2006 FIFA World Cup qualification	2nd Round (8 groups of 4)	3rd of 4; 6/18 points	China 0–1 (h), 0–7 (a); Kuwait 0–2 (h), 0–4 (a); Malaysia 2–0 (h), 3–1 (a)	Did not qualify for 3rd Round
(Indonesia) (Malaysia) (Thailand) (Vietnam) 2007 AFC Asian Cup qualification	Preliminary Round	Bye		Did not qualify
(Indonesia) (Malaysia) (Thailand) (Vietnam) 2007 AFC Asian Cup qualification	Qualifying Round (1 group of 3 and 5 groups of 4)	3rd of 4; 8/18 points	Qatar 0–3 (h), 0–2 (a); Uzbekistan 0–0 (h), 2–2 (a); Bangladesh 2–0 (h), 1–0 (a)	Did not qualify
(South Africa) 2010 FIFA World Cup qualification	1st Round (knockout)	Won	Timor-Leste 3–2 (h), 8–1 (a)	Did not qualify for 3rd Round
(South Africa) 2010 FIFA World Cup qualification	2nd Round (knockout)	Defeat	Turkmenistan 0–0 (h), 0–3 (a)	Did not qualify for 3rd Round
(Qatar) 2011 AFC Asian Cup qualification	Preliminary Round	Bye		Did not qualify
(Qatar) 2011 AFC Asian Cup qualification	Qualifying Round (1 group of 3 and 3 groups of 4)	4th of 4; 1/18 points	Japan 0–4 (h), 0–6 (a); Bahrain 1–3 (h), 0–4 (a); Yemen 0–0 (h), 0–1 (a)	Did not qualify
(Brazil) 2014 FIFA World Cup qualification	1st Round	Bye		Did not qualify for 3rd Round
(Brazil) 2014 FIFA World Cup qualification	2nd Round (knockout)	Defeat	Saudi Arabia 0–3 (h), 0–5 (a)	Did not qualify for 3rd Round
(Australia) 2015 AFC Asian Cup qualification	Groups (5 groups of 4)	3rd of 4; 4/18 points	United Arab Emirates 0–4 (h), 0–4 (a); Uzbekistan 0–2 (h), 0–0 (a); Vietnam 1–0 (h), 1–3 (a)	Did not qualify
(Russia) 2018 FIFA World Cup qualification	1st Round	Bye		Did not qualify for 3rd Round
(Russia) 2018 FIFA World Cup qualification	2nd Round (1 group of 4 and 7 groups of 5)	3rd of 5; 14/24 points	China 0–0 (h), 0–0 (a); Qatar 2–3 (h), 0–2 (a); Maldives 2–0 (h), 1–0 (a); Bhutan 7–0 (h), 1–0 (a)	Did not qualify for 3rd Round
(United Arab Emirates) 2019 AFC Asian Cup qualification	1st Round	Bye		Did not qualify
(United Arab Emirates) 2019 AFC Asian Cup qualification	2nd Round (1 group of 4 and 7 groups of 5)	3rd of 5; 14/24 points	China 0–0 (h), 0–0 (a); Qatar 2–3 (h), 0–2 (a); Maldives 2–0 (h), 1–0 (a); Bhutan 7–0 (h), 1–0 (a)	Did not qualify
(United Arab Emirates) 2019 AFC Asian Cup qualification	Play-off Round	Bye		Did not qualify
(United Arab Emirates) 2019 AFC Asian Cup qualification	3rd Round (6 groups of 4)	3rd of 4; 5/18 points	Lebanon 0–1 (h), 0–2 (a); North Korea 1–1 (h), 0–2 (a); Malaysia 2–0 (h), 1–1 (a)	Did not qualify
(Qatar) 2022 FIFA World Cup qualification	1st Round	Bye		Did not qualify for 3rd Round
(Qatar) 2022 FIFA World Cup qualification	2nd Round (1 group of 4 and 7 groups of 5)	4th of 5; 5/24 points	Iran 0–2 (h), 1–3 (a); Iraq 0–1 (h), 0–2 (a); Bahrain 0–0 (h), 0–4 (a); Cambodia 2–0 (h), 1–1 (a)	Did not qualify for 3rd Round
(Qatar) 2023 AFC Asian Cup qualification	1st Round	Bye		Qualified
(Qatar) 2023 AFC Asian Cup qualification	2nd Round (1 group of 4 and 7 groups of 5)	4th of 5; 5/24 points	Iran 0–2 (h), 1–3 (a); Iraq 0–1 (h), 0–2 (a); Bahrain 0–0 (h), 0–4 (a); Cambodia 2–0 (h), 1–1 (a)	Qualified
(Qatar) 2023 AFC Asian Cup qualification	Play-off Round	Bye		Qualified
(Qatar) 2023 AFC Asian Cup qualification	3rd Round (6 groups of 4)	2nd of 4; 6/9 points 5th of best runner-up team	Afghanistan 2–1 (n); Cambodia 3–0 (n); India 0–4 (n)	Qualified
(Qatar) 2023 AFC Asian Cup	Group Stage (6 groups of 4)	4th of 4; 0/9 points	United Arab Emirates 1–3 (n); Iran 0–1 (n); Palestine 0–3 (n)	Knocked out in Group Stage, 23rd of 24 in overall
(Canada) (Mexico) (United States) 2026 FIFA World Cup qualification	1st Round (knockout)	Won	Bhutan 4–0 (h), 0–2 (a)	Did not qualify for 3rd Round
(Canada) (Mexico) (United States) 2026 FIFA World Cup qualification	2nd Round (9 groups of 4)	4th of 4; 2/18 points	Iran 2–4 (h), 0–4 (a); Turkmenistan 2–2 (h), 0–0 (a); Uzbekistan 0–2 (h), 0–3 (a)	Did not qualify for 3rd Round
(Saudi Arabia) 2027 AFC Asian Cup qualification	1st Round (knockout)	Won	Bhutan 4–0 (h), 0–2 (a)	Did not qualify
(Saudi Arabia) 2027 AFC Asian Cup qualification	2nd Round (9 groups of 4)	4th of 4; 2/18 points	Iran 2–4 (h), 0–4 (a); Turkmenistan 2–2 (h), 0–0 (a); Uzbekistan 0–2 (h), 0–3 (a)	Did not qualify
(Saudi Arabia) 2027 AFC Asian Cup qualification	Play-off Round	Bye		Did not qualify
(Saudi Arabia) 2027 AFC Asian Cup qualification	3rd Round (6 groups of 4)	2nd of 4; 8/18 points	Singapore 1–2 (h), 0–0 (a); India 1–0 (h), 1–2 (a); Bangladesh 1–1 (h), 4–3 (a)	Did not qualify

== Regional Tournaments ==
Tournament	Section	Placing	Results	Notes
(Japan) 2003 East Asian Football Championship Preliminary	1 group of 5	1st of 5; 12/12 points	Chinese Taipei 2–0 (h) (Macau) 3–0 (h); Mongolia 10–0 (h); Guam 11–0 (h)	Qualified
(Japan) 2003 East Asian Football Championship	1 group of 4	4th of 4; 0/9 points	South Korea 1–3 (n); Japan 0–1 (a); China 1–3 (n)	
(South Korea) 2005 East Asian Football Championship Preliminary	1 group of 5	2nd of 5; 9/12 points	North Korea 0–2 (n); Chinese Taipei 5–0 (a); Mongolia 6–0 (n); Guam 15–0 (n)	Did not qualify
(China) 2008 East Asian Football Championship Preliminary	Stage 1	Bye		Did not qualify
(China) 2008 East Asian Football Championship Preliminary	Stage 2 (2 groups of 3, then Final)	1st of 3; 4/6 points Defeat in Final	Chinese Taipei 1–1 (n); Guam 15–1 (n); North Korea 0–1 (n)	Did not qualify
(Japan) 2010 East Asian Football Championship Preliminary	Round 1	Bye		Qualified
(Japan) 2010 East Asian Football Championship Preliminary	Round 2 (1 group of 4)	1st of 4; 7/9 points	Chinese Taipei 4–0 (a); North Korea 0–0 (n); Guam 12–0 (n)	Qualified
(Japan) 2010 East Asian Football Championship	1 group of 4	4th of 4; 0/9 points	South Korea 0–5 (n); Japan 0–3 (a); China 0–2 (n)	
(South Korea) 2013 EAFF East Asian Cup Preliminary	Round 1	Bye		Did not qualify
(South Korea) 2013 EAFF East Asian Cup Preliminary	Round 2 (1 group of 5)	3rd of 5; 6/12 points	Guam 2–1 (h); Australia 0–1 (h); Chinese Taipei 2–0 (h); North Korea 0–4 (h)	Did not qualify
(China) 2015 EAFF East Asian Cup Preliminary	1st Round	Bye		Did not qualify
(China) 2015 EAFF East Asian Cup Preliminary	2nd Round (1 group of 4)	2nd of 4; 4/9 points	North Korea 1–2 (n); Chinese Taipei 1–0 (a); Guam 0–0 (n)	Did not qualify
(Japan) 2017 EAFF E-1 Football Championship Preliminary	1st Round	Bye		Did not qualify
(Japan) 2017 EAFF E-1 Football Championship Preliminary	2nd Round (1 group of 4)	2nd of 4; 6/9 points	Guam 3–2 (h); Chinese Taipei 4–2 (h); North Korea 0–1 (h)	Did not qualify
(South Korea) 2019 EAFF E-1 Football Championship Preliminary	1st Round	Bye		Qualified
(South Korea) 2019 EAFF E-1 Football Championship Preliminary	2nd Round (1 group of 4)	1st of 4; 7/9 points	Chinese Taipei 2–1 (a); North Korea 0–0 (n); Mongolia 5–1 (n)	Qualified
(South Korea) 2019 EAFF E-1 Football Championship	1 group of 4	4th of 4; 0/9 points	South Korea 0–2 (a); Japan 0–5 (n); China 0–2 (n)	
(Japan) 2022 EAFF E-1 Football Championship	1 group of 4	4th of 4; 0/9 points	Japan 0–6 (a); South Korea 0–3 (n); China 0–1 (n)	Qualified by FIFA Rankings
(South Korea) 2025 EAFF E-1 Football Championship Preliminary	1 group of 2 and 1 group of 3, then Final	1st of 3; 6/6 points won in Final	Mongolia 3–0 (h); Chinese Taipei 2–1 (h); Guam 5–0 (h)	Qualified
(South Korea) 2025 EAFF E-1 Football Championship	1 group of 4	4th of 4; 0/9 points	South Korea 0–2 (a); Japan 1–6 (n); China 0–1 (n)	
(Hong Kong) 2026 FIFA ASEAN Challenge Cup	2 group of 3, then Final	1st of 3; 6/6 points won in Final	Laos 4–0 (h); Brunei 2–0 (h); Cambodia 2–0 (h)	Qualified as host
