= AFC Asian Cup qualifiers =

- Founded: 1956
- Region: Asia and Australia (AFC)
- Teams: 46 (currently eligible); 47 (overall)
- Qualifier for: AFC Asian Cup
- Website: Official website
- 2031 AFC Asian Cup qualification

The AFC Asian Cup qualification (Note: The notation used in the logo for the qualifiers is "AFC Asian Qualifiers".) is the process that a national association football team goes through to qualify for the final tournament of AFC Asian Cup. The qualification reduces the large field of eligible entrants from 47 to just 24 for the finals.

The hosts receive automatic berths, and between 1972 and 2015 (except 1976), so did the defending champions.

== Format evolution ==
Over the past century, the AFC Asian Cup has seen various changes in its qualification format as well as the number of teams participating.

Number of teams entering qualification
	(Hong Kong) 1956	(South Korea) 1960	(Israel) 1964	(Iran) 1968	(Thailand) 1972	(Iran) 1976	(Kuwait) 1980	(Singapore) 1984	(Qatar) 1988	(Japan) 1992	(United Arab Emirates) 1996	(Lebanon) 2000	(China) 2004	(Indonesia) (Malaysia) (Thailand) (Vietnam) 2007	(Qatar) 2011	(Australia) 2015	(United Arab Emirates) 2019	(Qatar) 2023	(Saudi Arabia) 2027
Total entrants	19	18	18	19	26	31	31	30	24	22	35	42	43	25	27	20	46	46	47
Played at least one match	6	10	4	14	13	15	17	21	20	20	33	42	43	24	24	20	45	46	46
Qualified via qualification	2	3	1	3	5	3	9	8	8	6	10	10	14	12	10	11	23	23	23
Qualified without playing	2 (Note: 1 team qualified by walkover)	1	3 (Note: 2 teams qualified by walkover)	2	1	3	1	2	2	2	2	2	2	4	6	5	0 (Note: The host qualified automatically for the Asian Cup but participated in the qualification as a World Cup qualifier.)	0	0
Total finalists	4	4	4	4	6	6	10	10	10	8	12	12	16	16	16	16	24	24	24

=== 1956 ===
The 19 teams were divided in to three different zones based upon their location. In each zone, the teams played in a two legged Knockout format. The four winners of first round advanced to the next round. The two winners in the second round advanced to final which decided the team participating in the final tournament along with the hosts.

=== 1960–1972 ===
From 1960, the format had a slight change. The participating teams were again divided into zones based upon their location. The teams in their zones played against each other once, in a round robin format. The group topper of each zone advanced to the final tournament along with the hosts.

=== 1972–1980 ===
Starting from 1972, the format saw another change. Instead of zones, the teams were now divided into groups, with two teams instead of one advancing to the final tournament along with the hosts. Also the number of teams participating in the final tournament was increased to six and then to ten in 1980.

=== 1984 & 1988 ===
For a brief period, the teams were divided into groups not based on their location. This saw teams from all zones competing against each other in Asian Cup qualifiers for the first time since its inception. Two teams from each group qualified for the final tournament, along with the winners of previous edition who received a direct entry and as well as the hosts.

=== 1992–2000 ===
The format was reverted to an older one where teams were segregated based upon their location, but this time the number of participating nations increased. Winners of previous edition and the hosts were joined by the winner of each groups in qualifiers. The number of participants in the final tournament was increased to 12.

=== 2004 & 2007 ===
The tournament started from the preliminary round where the lower ranked teams played against each other, the winners of this round qualified for the qualifying round. In the qualifying round, top two teams from each group qualified for the final tournament. Participation of teams in the final tournament increased from 12 to 16.

=== 2011 & 2015 ===
The hosts, previous edition's winners, runner-up and third placed sides automatically qualified for the final tournament. AFC Challenge Cup winners(2) were also awarded a slot in the final tournament. The remaining ten slots were decided by the qualifying tournament in which the lower ranked teams played in preliminary rounds and the winners advanced to the qualifying round. In the qualifying round, the top two teams from each group received a berth in the final tournament.

=== 2019 & 2023 ===
The proposal to merge the preliminary qualification rounds for FIFA World Cup qualifiers with those for the Asian Cup was ratified by the AFC Competitions Committee.

The tournament was expanded to 24 teams from previous number of 16.

The qualification structure is as follows:

- First round: A total of 12 teams (teams ranked 35–46) played home-and-away over two legs. The six winners advanced to the second round.
- Second round: A total of 40 teams (teams ranked 1–34 and six first round winners) were divided into eight groups of five teams to play home-and-away round-robin matches.
  - The eight group winners and the four best group runners-up advanced to the third round of FIFA World Cup qualification as well as qualified for the AFC Asian Cup finals.
  - The next 16 highest ranked teams (the remaining four group runners-up, the eight third-placed teams and the four best group fourth-placed teams) advanced directly to the third round of Asian Cup qualification.
  - The remaining 12 teams entered the play-off round to contest the remaining eight spots in the third round of Asian Cup qualification.
- Play-off round: At a Competition Committee meeting in November 2014, it was decided that a play-off round of qualifying would be introduced into the qualification procedure. There were two rounds of home-and-away two-legged play-off matches to determine the final eight qualifiers for the third round.
- Third round: The 24 teams were divided into six groups of four to play home-and-away round-robin matches, and they competed for the remaining slots of the AFC Asian Cup.

The play-off round represented a change from the initially announced qualification format – which saw the remaining fourth-placed teams and the four best group fifth-placed teams also advance to the third round.

=== 2027–present ===
The new qualification format starting with the 2027 qualifiers was announced on 1 August 2022, having been revamped to fit the increased allocation of eight direct qualifiers and one play-off qualifier for the FIFA World Cup:

- First round: 20 teams (ranked 27–46) played home-and-away over two legs.
  - 10 winners advanced to the second round.
  - 1 best ranked losing teams advanced to the third round.
  - 9 worst ranked losing teams advanced to the play-off round.
- Second round: 36 teams (ranked 1–26 and 10 first-round winners) were divided into 9 groups of 4 teams to play home-and-away double round-robin matches.
  - The 9 group winners and 9 group runners-up qualified for the Asian Cup along with the host and advanced to the third round of 2026 FIFA World Cup qualifiers.
  - The remaining 18 teams advanced to the third round of Asian Cup qualification.
- Play-off round: 10 teams (the worst ranked losing teams from the first round, plus non-FIFA member Northern Mariana Islands) played home-and-away over two legs that determined the final 5 qualifiers for the third round.
- Third round: 24 teams (1 best ranked losing team from the first round + 18 third and fourth-placed teams from the second round + 5 winners from the play-off round) were divided into 6 groups of 4 teams to play home-and-away double round-robin matches and the winner of each group occupied the remaining 6 slots for the Asian Cup.

== Participating teams ==
Only teams that played at least one match are considered for the purposes of first appearance. Teams that withdrew prior to the qualification, or that qualified to the AFC Asian Cup by walkover due to other teams' withdrawals, are not considered.

First appearance in qualification by team
Year	Debuting teams			Successor teams	Renamed teams
Year	Teams	No.	CT	Successor teams	Renamed teams
1956	Cambodia (Note: Cambodia was renamed as Khmer Republic in the 1972 qualification, then entered the 1980 qualification as Democratic Kampuchea but withdrew, and in the 2000 qualification again using the name Cambodia), Malaya (Note: Malaya was succeeded by Malaysia from the 1964 qualification.), Philippines, Taiwan (Note: The Republic of China became officially known as Chinese Taipei from the 1992 qualification.), South Korea, South Vietnam (Note: South Vietnam was succeeded by Vietnam from the 1996 qualification.)	6	6		
1960	Hong Kong (Note: Qualified automatically for the 1956 Asian Cup as host.), India (Note: Withdrew from the 1956 qualification before playing.), Iran, Israel (Note: Qualified by walkover for the 1956 finals.), Pakistan, Singapore	6	12		
1964	Thailand (Note: Withdrew from the 1956 and 1960 qualification before playing.)	1	13	Malaysia	
1968	Burma (Note: Withdrew from the 1956, 1960 and 1964 qualifications before playing.) (Note: Burma was renamed as Myanmar from the 1996 qualification.), Indonesia (Note: Withdrew from the 1956 and 1964 qualification before playing. In 1960 Indonesia declined to participate due to an AFC membership dispute), Japan	3	16		
1972	Bahrain, Brunei, Ceylon (Note: Withdrew from the 1956, 1960, 1964 and 1968 qualifications before playing.) (Note: Ceylon was renamed as Sri Lanka from the 1980 qualification.), Iraq, Jordan, Kuwait (Note: Withdrew from the 1968 qualification before playing.), Lebanon, Syria	8	24		Khmer Republic
1976	Afghanistan (Note: Withdrew from the 1956, 1960, 1964, 1968 and 1972 qualifications before playing.), China, North Korea, Qatar, Saudi Arabia	5	29		
1980	Bangladesh (Note: Withdrew from the 1976 qualification before playing.), Macau, United Arab Emirates	3	32		Sri Lanka
1984	Nepal (Note: Withdrew from the 1972, 1976 and 1980 qualifications before playing.), North Yemen (Note: North Yemen was succeeded by Yemen from the 1994 qualification.), Oman	3	35		
1988	South Yemen (Note: Qualified automatically for the 1976 finals. Withdrew from the 1980 and 1984 qualifications before playing.)	1	36		
1992	None	0	36		Chinese Taipei
1996	Guam, Kazakhstan, Kyrgyzstan, Maldives (Note: Withdrew from the 1992 qualification before playing.), Tajikistan, Turkmenistan, Uzbekistan	7	43	Yemen; Vietnam	Myanmar
2000	Bhutan, Laos, Mongolia, Palestine	4	47		Cambodia
2004	Timor-Leste	1	48		
2007	Australia	1	49		
2011	None	0	49		
2015	None	0	49		
2019	None	0	49		
2023	None	0	49		
2027	None	0	49		

Teams' entries prior to their actual debuts in qualification

Successor and renamed teams

== Team records ==
The below table compares the overall records of all teams that have participated in qualification. Teams are ordered by points using the three points for a win system, then by goal difference, and then by goals scored. Note that this order does not represent any official rankings, and qualification tournaments are not direct competitions among all teams.

The "Qualifying attempts" column only counts qualifying campaigns where the team played at least one match, while the "Appearances in the finals" also include automatic qualifiers.

As per statistical convention in football, matches decided in extra time are counted as wins and losses, while matches decided by penalty shoot-outs are counted as draws.

Key
Team has qualified for the main tournament
Team has not qualified for the main tournament
Team is no longer a member of AFC, but has qualified for the main tournament
Team is no longer a member of AFC
Defunct team has qualified for the main tournament only by walkover

The table is updated to the matches played in June 2026.

No.	Team	Qualifying attempts		Appearances in the finals	Overall qualification record							Points	
No.	Team	Total	Successful	Appearances in the finals	Pld	W	D	L	GF	GA	GD	Points	Avg
1	Iran	13	12	16	76	57	12	7	226	41	+185	183	2.408
2	Thailand	16	8	9	93	45	17	31	180	121	+59	152	1.634
3	Syria	14	8	8	80	46	12	22	164	82	+82	150	1.875
4	Qatar	12	10	12	64	46	8	10	152	41	+111	146	2.281
5	South Korea	14	11	16	62	46	7	9	206	25	+181	145	2.339
6	United Arab Emirates	12	11	12	62	45	9	8	169	36	+133	144	2.323
7	China	13	13	14	66	43	13	10	187	35	+152	142	2.152
8	Saudi Arabia	9	9	12	54	43	7	4	164	24	+140	136	2.519
9	Jordan	12	6	6	75	39	19	17	139	62	+77	136	1.813
10	Oman	11	6	6	67	40	8	19	151	62	+89	128	1.910
11	Malaysia	18	3	4	100	37	17	46	167	181	–14	128	1.280
12	Japan	9	7	11	50	41	4	5	162	19	+143	127	2.540
13	Iraq	10	10	11	55	39	10	6	119	37	+82	127	2.309
14	Bahrain	12	8	8	71	37	11	23	106	62	+44	122	1.718
15	Hong Kong	18	3	4	106	31	27	48	133	158	–25	120	1.132
16	Uzbekistan	9	9	9	53	37	7	9	125	43	+82	118	2.226
17	Kuwait	12	8	11	66	32	17	17	139	63	+76	113	1.712
18	Vietnam	13	5	6	73	33	10	28	124	99	+25	108	1.479
19	Lebanon	9	2	3	65	26	14	25	91	81	+10	92	1.415
20	Indonesia	14	5	6	72	26	13	33	116	111	+5	91	1.264
21	North Korea	8	7	6	51	26	11	14	81	55	+26	89	1.745
22	Singapore	14	1	2	88	25	14	49	97	170	–73	89	1.011
23	Yemen	11	2	2	84	23	18	43	104	150	–46	87	1.036
24	Australia	5	5	6	32	27	2	3	92	13	+79	83	2.594
25	Tajikistan	6	2	2	50	22	11	17	82	66	+16	77	1.540
26	India	12	3	5	75	21	15	39	80	119	–39	78	1.040
27	Turkmenistan	6	2	2	49	22	7	20	73	74	–1	73	1.490
28	Myanmar	7	1	1	59	21	7	31	76	160	–84	70	1.186
29	Palestine	6	3	4	46	19	8	19	84	52	+32	65	1.413
30	Kyrgyzstan	6	3	3	40	18	7	15	71	57	+14	61	1.525
31	Philippines	10	1	1	59	15	10	34	64	155	–91	55	0.932
32	Chinese Taipei	11	2	2	70	16	3	51	86	184	–98	51	0.723
33	Cambodia	7	1	1	51	12	8	31	46	143	–97	44	0.863
34	Afghanistan	7	0	0	55	9	14	32	43	134	–91	41	0.745
35	Bangladesh	10	1	1	69	7	17	45	43	170	–127	38	0.551
36	Sri Lanka	9	0	0	52	10	4	38	42	151	–109	34	0.654
37	Maldives	7	0	0	53	9	4	40	45	150	–105	31	0.585
38	Bhutan	5	0	0	40	7	3	30	28	186	–158	24	0.600
39	Pakistan	12	0	0	53	5	7	41	27	142	–115	22	0.415
40	Nepal	8	0	0	53	6	4	43	23	187	–164	22	0.415
41	Mongolia	5	0	0	24	6	1	17	18	52	–34	19	0.792
42	Laos	5	0	0	27	5	4	18	18	80	–62	19	0.704
43	Macau	8	0	0	28	5	2	21	23	64	–41	17	0.607
44	Brunei	7	0	0	25	5	1	19	12	102	–90	16	0.640
45	Timor-Leste	4	0	0	28	4	2	22	21	90	–69	14	0.500
46	Kazakhstan	2	0	0	8	4	0	4	9	9	0	12	1.500
47	Israel	1	1	4	6	3	2	1	10	8	+2	11	1.833
48	Guam	6	0	0	28	3	1	26	14	125	–111	10	0.357
49	South Yemen	1	0	1	3	0	1	2	1	4	–3	1	0.333

== Teams yet to qualify for the finals tournament ==
Legend

- • – Did not qualify
- × – Did not enter / Withdrew / Banned

For each tournament, the number of teams in each finals tournament are shown (in parentheses).

Team (14)	1956 (4)	1960 (4)	1964 (4)	1968 (5)	1972 (6)	1976 (6)	1980 (8)	1984 (8)	1988 (8)	1992 (8)	1996 (12)	2000 (12)	2004 (16)	2007 (16)	2011 (16)	2015 (16)	2019 (24)	2023 (24)	2027 (24)	Attempts
Afghanistan	×	×	×	×	×	•	•	•	×	×	×	×	•	×	•	•	•	•	•	8
Bhutan	×	×	×	×	×	×	×	×	×	×	×	•	•	×	•	•	•	•	•	6
Brunei	×	×	×	×	•	•	×	×	×	×	×	•	•	×	•	×	•	•	•	7
Guam	×	×	×	×	×	×	×	×	×	×	•	•	•	×	•	•	×	•	×	6
~~Kazakhstan~~ (Note: Kazakhstan played in two qualification competitions before joining UEFA in 2002, but had never qualified for the Asian Cup.)	Part of Soviet Union										•	•	UEFA member							2
Laos	×	×	×	×	×	×	×	×	×	×	×	•	•	×	×	•	•	•	•	5
Macau	×	×	×	×	×	×	•	×	×	•	•	•	•	×	•	•	•	•	•	9
Maldives	Part of UK			×	×	×	×	×	×	×	•	•	•	×	•	•	•	•	•	7
Mongolia	Not AFC member											•	•	×	•	•	•	•	•	6
Nepal	Not AFC member				×	×	×	•	•	×	•	•	•	×	•	•	•	•	•	9
Northern Mariana Islands	Not AFC member														×	•	×	×	×	1
Pakistan	×	•	×	•	×	×	×	•	•	•	•	•	•	•	•	•	•	•	•	13
Sri Lanka	×	×	×	×	•	×	•	•	×	×	•	•	•	×	•	•	•	•	•	10
Timor-Leste	Part of Portugal					Part of Indonesia						×	•	×	×	×	•	× (Note: Timor-Leste were banned from qualifying for the 2023 Asian Cup for using twelve ineligible players between 2011 and 2017 and providing false documents.)	•	2

== See also ==
- AFC Women's Asian Cup qualification
- AFC Nations League
- AFC Women's Olympic Qualifying Tournament
- FIFA World Cup qualification
- FIFA Women's World Cup qualification
- UEFA European Championship qualifying
- UEFA Women's Championship qualifying
- CONCACAF Gold Cup qualification
