= Đỗ Quang Thách =

South Vietnamese international footballer (1928–2020)

Personal information
- Full name: Đỗ Quang Thách
- Date of birth: 15 January 1928
- Place of birth: French Cochinchina
- Date of death: 17 May 2020 (aged 92)
- Place of death: San Jose, California, U.S.
- Height: 1.58 m (5 ft 2 in)
- Positions: Inside left; attacking midfielder

Senior career*
Years	Team	Apps	(Gls)
- Association de la Jeunesse sportive

International career
1956–1960	South Vietnam	8+	(3+)
- * Club domestic league appearances and goals

Đỗ Quang Thách (15 January 1928 – 17 May 2020) was a Vietnamese footballer who played as an inside left or attacking midfielder. He represented the South Vietnam national team.

== Career ==
Thách was part of South Vietnam's squad at the 1956 AFC Asian Cup, where during qualification, he scored two goals in a 4–0 win against Malaya. He also played for them at the 1959 SEAP Games, where he scored in the gold medal match to help South Vietnam win, and at the 1960 AFC Asian Cup.

== Later life and death ==
Thách moved to the United States, and resided in San Jose, California. At the time of Trần Văn Nhung's death on 10 October 2020, he was reported to be the last surviving player from South Vietnam's 1959 SEAP Games gold medal-winning team. However, Thách had died in San Jose on 17 May 2020, at the age of 92.
