= 1956 AFC Asian Cup qualification =

Tournament details
- Dates: 17 March – 24 May 1956
- Teams: 19 (from 1 confederation)

Tournament statistics
- Matches played: 8
- Goals scored: 36 (4.5 per match)

The qualification for the 1956 AFC Asian Cup consisted of 19 teams separated in three zones. The winner of each zone would join hosts Hong Kong in the final tournament. Qualification was done on a two-legged format, home and away games.

== Central zone ==
=== First round ===
South Vietnam and Thailand received a bye to the second round.

Team 1	Agg.	Team 2	1st leg	2nd leg
Singapore	w/o	Indonesia		
Malaya	11–5	Cambodia	9–2	2–3

==== First leg ====
17 March 1956

Malaya	9–2	Cambodia
Ghani 14', 25', 30', 35', 40', 45', 48'; Siang Hock 20', 49'		Nguon Tuy 70'; Reith 71'

Princes Road Stadium, Kuala Lumpur
Attendance: 4,000
Referee: Greg de Silva (Singapore)

==== Second leg ====
24 April 1956

Cambodia	3–2	Malaya
Lung 35', 78'; Nguon Tuy 65'		Ghani 20' ? 45' (o.g.)

Lambert Stadium, Phnom Penh
Referee: Trương Văn Ký (South Vietnam)

Malaya won 11–5 on aggregate.

=== Second round ===
Team 1	Agg.	Team 2	1st leg	2nd leg
Thailand	w/o	Indonesia		
South Vietnam	7–3	Malaya	4–0	3–3

==== First leg ====
3 May 1956

South Vietnam	4–0	Malaya
Đỗ Quang Thách 17', 57'; Lê Hữu Đức 30'; Nguyễn Văn Tư 65'

Republic Stadium, Saigon
Attendance: 20,000
Referee: Eng Ly Bean (Cambodia)

==== Second leg ====
24 May 1956

Malaya	3–3	South Vietnam
Ghani 55', 80'; Siang Hock 83'		Nguyễn Văn Tư 24'; Trần Văn Nhung 74', 88'

Princes Road Stadium, Kuala Lumpur
Attendance: 7,500
Referee: Greg de Silva (Malaya)

South Vietnam won 7–3 on aggregate.

=== Third round ===
Team 1	Agg.	Team 2	1st leg	2nd leg
Indonesia	w/o	South Vietnam		

South Vietnam qualified for the 1956 AFC Asian Cup.

== Eastern zone ==
Philippines, South Korea and North Borneo received a bye to the second round.

=== First round ===
Team 1	Agg.	Team 2	1st leg	2nd leg
Japan	w/o	Taiwan		

=== Second round ===
Team 1	Agg.	Team 2	1st leg	2nd leg
Philippines	0–5	South Korea	0–2	0–3
North Borneo	w/o	Taiwan		

==== First leg ====
25 February 1956

Philippines	0–2	South Korea
		Sung Nak-woon 53'; Choi Jung-min 56'

Rizal Memorial Stadium, Manila
Attendance: 8,000
Referee: Johnny Cuatico (Philippines)

==== Second leg ====
21 April 1956

South Korea	3–0	Philippines
Kim Hong-woo 5', 62'; Woo Sang-kwon 59'

Seoul Stadium, Seoul
Attendance: 40,000
Referee: Lee Yong-il (South Korea)

South Korea won 5–0 on aggregate.

=== Third round ===
Team 1	Agg.	Team 2	1st leg	2nd leg
South Korea	4–1	Taiwan	2–0	2–1

==== First leg ====
26 August 1956

South Korea	2–0	Taiwan
Choi Jung-min 23'; Kim Dong-keun 78'

Seoul Stadium, Seoul
Attendance: 35,000
Referee: Kim Duk-joon (South Korea)

==== Second leg ====
2 September 1956

Taiwan	1–2	South Korea
Chu Wing-keung 20'		Woo Sang-kwon 66' (pen.); Kim Dong-keun 79'

Municipal Stadium, Taipei
Attendance: 20,000
Referee: Richard Tucker (Hong Kong)

South Korea won 4–1 on aggregate and qualified for the 1956 AFC Asian Cup.

== Western zone ==
=== First round ===
Team 1	Agg.	Team 2	1st leg	2nd leg
India	w/o	Iran		
Burma	w/o	Nepal		
Ceylon	w/o	Afghanistan		
Pakistan	w/o	Israel		

=== Second round ===
Team 1	Agg.	Team 2	1st leg	2nd leg
	n/a			
Afghanistan	w/o	Israel		

=== Third round ===
Team 1	Agg.	Team 2	1st leg	2nd leg
Bye	w/o	Israel		

Israel qualified for the 1956 AFC Asian Cup.

== Qualified teams ==
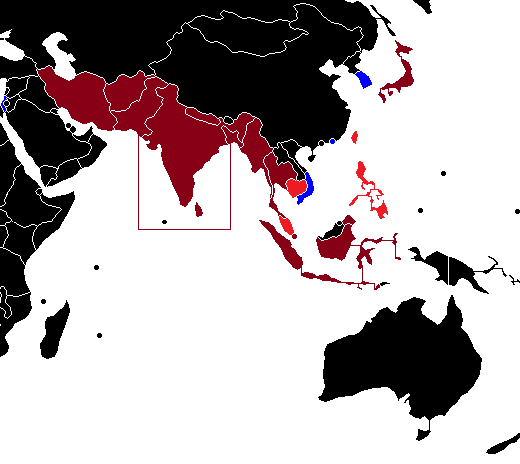
Qualified Did not qualify Withdrew before playing any matches Did not enter Not an AFC member

Team	Qualified as	Qualified on
Hong Kong	Hosts	7 June 1955
Israel	Western Zone winners (Automatically qualified)	April 1956
South Vietnam	Central Zone winners	24 May 1956
South Korea	Eastern Zone winners	2 September 1956

=== Goalscorers ===
There were 36 goals scored in 8 matches, for an average of 4.5 goals per match.

10 goals

- (Federation of Malaya) Abdul Ghani Minhat

3 goals

- (Federation of Malaya) Pang Siang Hock

2 goals

- (Cambodia) Nguon Tuy
- (Cambodia) Lung
- (South Korea) Choi Jung-min
- (South Korea) Woo Sang-kwon
- (South Korea) Kim Hong-woo
- (South Korea) Kim Dong-keun
- (South Vietnam) Trần Văn Nhung
- (South Vietnam) Đỗ Quang Thách
- (South Vietnam) Nguyễn Văn Tư

1 goal

- (Cambodia) Reith Peon
- (South Korea) Sung Nak-woon
- (South Vietnam) Lê Hữu Đức
- (Taiwan) Chu Wing-keung
