= Thanabalan Nadarajah (footballer, born 1943) =

Malaysian footballer

Personal information
- Full name: Thanabalan a/l Nadarajah
- Date of birth: 1943 (age 82–83)
- Place of birth: Brickfields, Selangor, British Malaya
- Position: Striker

Senior career*
Years	Team	Apps	(Gls)
1960–1971	Selangor		

International career
1960–1963	Malaya U-20		
1964–1969	Malaysia	46	(20)
- * Club domestic league appearances and goals

Thanabalan a/l Nadarajah (born in 1943) was a Malaysian former footballer. He is remembered for his contribution during the Merdeka Tournament in 1968. Malaysia won the trophy by beating Burma 3–0 in the final. Thanabalan scored one of the three goals. Thanabalan scored 20 international goals in 46 appearances for Malaysia.

== Career Overview ==
As a player, he mainly played for Selangor FA in the Malaysia Cup competition. He together with the late Abdul Ghani Minhat, M. Chandran and Abdullah Yeop Noordin among the squad players that helped Selangor to become runners-up in the 1967 Asian Champion Club Tournament.

He was also one of the three players who had scored four goals in a Malaysia Cup final after Lee Ah Loke(1952) and Abdul Ghani Minhat(1963) in 1968.

On 23 September 2011, he was awarded the special award by Ex-State & Ex-National Footballers Association of Malaysia for being a top scorer in the final of the Malaysia Cup competition.

In 2013, he was inducted in Olympic Council of Malaysia's Hall of Fame.

== Career statistics ==
=== International ===
Scores and results list Malaysia's goal tally first, score column indicates score after each Thanabalan goal.

List of international goals scored by Thanabalan Nadarajah
No.	Date	Venue	Opponent	Score	Result	Competition	Ref.
1	2 September 1964	Kuala Lumpur, Malaysia	Taiwan	—	5-2	1964 Merdeka Tournament	
2	19 August 1965	Ipoh, Perak, Malaysia	South Vietnam	—	3-3	1965 Merdeka Tournament	
3	19 August 1965	Ipoh, Perak, Malaysia	South Vietnam	—	3-3	1965 Merdeka Tournament	
4	19 August 1965	Ipoh, Perak, Malaysia	South Vietnam	—	3-3	1965 Merdeka Tournament	
5	12 December 1966	Bangkok, Thailand	India	—	1-2	1966 Asian Games	
6	26 March 1967	Hong Kong	Hong Kong	—	1-3	1968 AFC Asian Cup qualification	
7	13 August 1967	Kuala Lumpur, Malaysia	Hong Kong	—	3-0	1967 Merdeka Tournament	
8	13 August 1967	Kuala Lumpur, Malaysia	Hong Kong	—	3-0	1967 Merdeka Tournament	
9	20 August 1967	Kuala Lumpur, Malaysia	Thailand	—	1-0	1967 Merdeka Tournament	
10	23 August 1967	Kuala Lumpur, Malaysia	South Korea	—	1-3	1967 Merdeka Tournament	
11	16 November 1967	Kuala Lumpur, Malaysia	New Zealand	—	2-8	Friendly Match	
12	11 August 1968	Kuala Lumpur, Malaysia	India	—	2-1	1968 Merdeka Tournament	
13	14 August 1968	Ipoh, Malaysia	South Vietnam	—	4-0	1968 Merdeka Tournament	
14	14 August 1968	Ipoh, Malaysia	South Vietnam	—	4-0	1968 Merdeka Tournament	
15	17 August 1968	Kuala Lumpur, Malaysia	Thailand	—	4-1	1968 Merdeka Tournament	
16	18 August 1968	Kuala Lumpur, Malaysia	Burma	—	1-1	1968 Merdeka Tournament	
17	25 August 1968	Kuala Lumpur, Malaysia	Burma	—	3-0	1968 Merdeka Tournament	
18	21 November 1968	Bangkok, Thailand	Laos	—	5-0	1968 King's Cup	
19	21 November 1968	Bangkok, Thailand	Laos	—	5-0	1968 King's Cup	
20	7 December 1969	Rangoon, Burma	Laos	—	2-1	1969 SEAP Games	

== Honours ==
Selangor

- Malaysia Cup (7): 1961, 1962, 1963, 1966, 1968, 1969, 1971
- Malaysia FAM Cup (5): 1960, 1961, 1962, 1966, 1968
- Asian Club Championship runner-up: 1967

=== International ===
Malaya U-20

- AFC Youth Championship runner-up: 1960

Malaysia

- Merdeka Tournament: 1968
