= Abdul Ghani Minhat =

Malaysian footballer (1935–2012)

Tan Sri Datuk Abdul Ghani Minhat
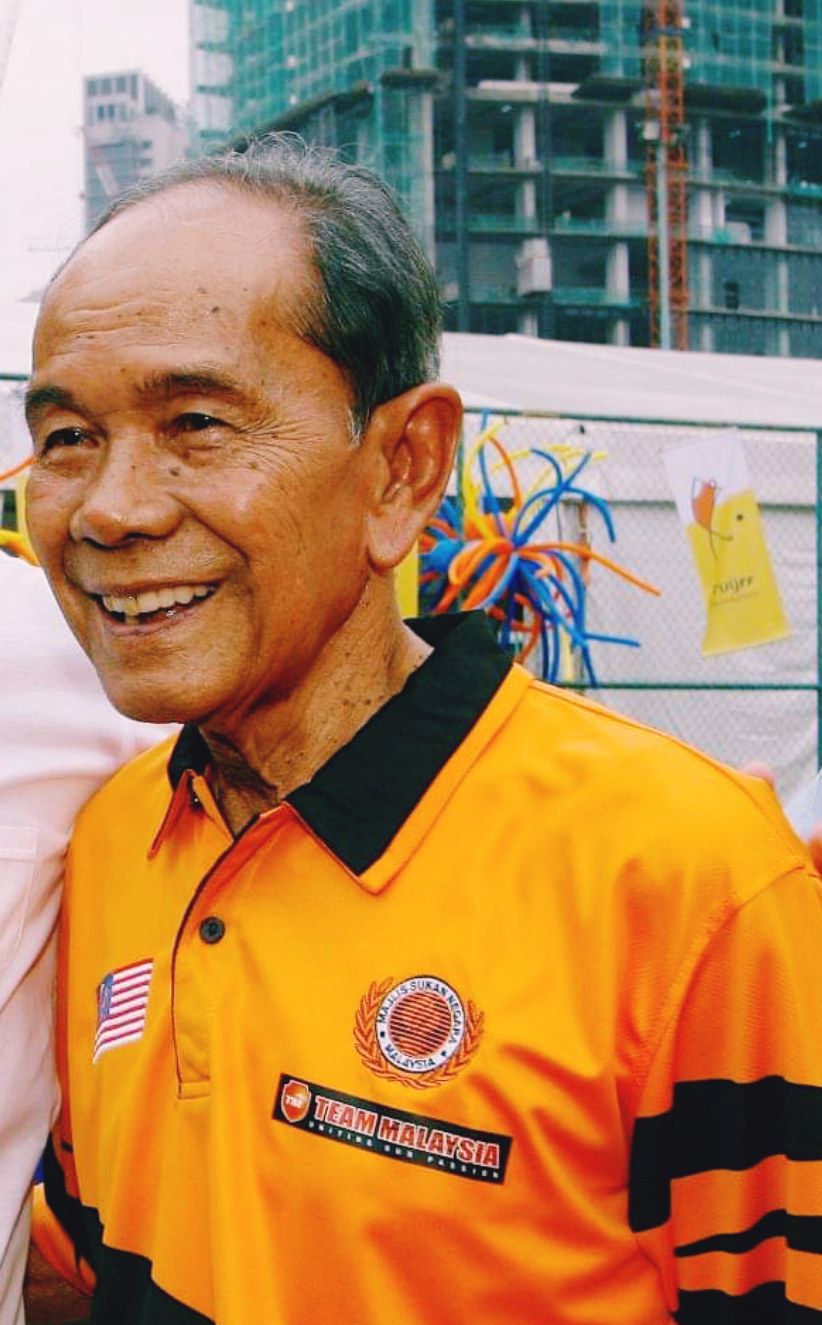

Personal information
- Full name: Abdul Ghani Bin Minhat
- Date of birth: 23 December 1935
- Place of birth: Kampung Solok, Rantau, Negeri Sembilan, British Malaya
- Date of death: 28 September 2012 (aged 76)
- Place of death: Kuala Lumpur, Malaysia
- Position: Striker

Senior career*
Years	Team	Apps	(Gls)
1955–1968	Selangor FA	97	(106)
1969	Negeri Sembilan FA		

International career
1956–1962	Malaya	57	(58)
1963–1966	Malaysia	14	(3)

Managerial career
- 1969: Malaysia
- 1970–1973: Selangor FA
- 1971: Malaysia B
- 1973: Malaysia
- 1975–1976: Malaysia
- 1983–1985: Selangor FA
Medal record
Men's football
Representing Malaysia
Asian Games
Third place	1962 Jakarta	Team
SEA Games
Gold medal – first place	1961 Rangoon	Team
- * Club domestic league appearances and goals

Tan Sri Datuk Abdul Ghani bin Minhat PSM PJN AMN DSSA DIMP (Jawi: عبدالغني منحت; December 1935 – 28 September 2012) was an association football player who represented Selangor FA and Negeri Sembilan FA from the 1950s to the late 1960s. He played as a striker and winger for both the Malaya and the Malaysia national teams. He was widely known by the nickname Raja Bola ("King of Football") and is regarded as one of Malaysia's greatest football players.

== Early life ==
Abdul Ghani Minhat was born on 23 December 1935 in Kampung Solok, Rantau, Negeri Sembilan. He began his education at Princess Road School in 1945 at the age of 10. During this time, he represented the school football team, often playing barefoot. In 1947, he enrolled at St. John's Institution in Kuala Lumpur and continued playing for the school team. In 1951, his talent was noticed by local police officers, who gave him his first pair of football boots. At the time, such equipment was expensive and typically only affordable to professional players.

== Club career ==
At the age of 17, his talent was spotted by police officers who invited Abdul Ghani to play for the Police Depot Football Team in the Selangor League. He was assigned to play as a left winger, despite being right-footed, and used the opportunity to develop his left-foot skills.

In 1955, Abdul Ghani was selected to play for Selangor as the team aimed to win the HMS Malaya Cup for the first time in six years. Selangor met Singapore in the 1956 final. Abdul Ghani contributed to Selangor’s 2–1 victory by scoring a goal and was praised by his teammates for his performance. Following the match, he was called up by national coach Neoh Boon Hean to represent the Malaya national team in a friendly against Cambodia.

He continued to play for Selangor in subsequent years, during which the club became one of the most dominant teams in Malaya and Singapore, earning the nickname "The Red Giants." Alongside players such as M. Chandran, Stanley Gabrielle, Robert Choe, and Arthur Koh, Selangor was considered a powerful and formidable side.

One of Abdul Ghani’s most valuable experiences came in 1962 when he was sent on attachment to train with several clubs in Europe, including West Ham United, Arsenal, Tottenham Hotspur, Cardiff City, and Eintracht Frankfurt. These attachments were part of an effort to provide him with greater exposure and advanced training.

In 1967, Abdul Ghani helped Selangor qualify for the inaugural 1967 Asian Club Championship. The team reached the final after defeating Tungsten Mining FC of South Korea. In the final, Selangor lost 2–1 to Hapoel Tel Aviv in Bangkok. Despite the loss, Selangor was commended by the Football Association of Malaysia for being the first Malaysian team to reach the final of the Asian Club Championship.

Abdul Ghani officially retired in 1968, with the 1968 Malaysia Cup final marking his last appearance. Selangor won the match with a decisive 8–1 victory.

== International career ==
Abdul Ghani first played for the Malaya national team when he was named among the 17 players which represent Malaya in the 1956 AFC Asian Cup qualification, together with the youngster Ray Crawford. On 17 March 1956, Abdul Ghani's first appearance with the national team was very impressive when Abdul Ghani scored an amazing seven goals to helping Malaya beat Cambodia 9–2.

The following year, he scored his first goal in the first ever edition, inaugural 1957 Pestabola Merdeka from an amazing 40 meters rocket shot against Vietnam in the tournament held at the Padang TPCA, Princess Road in 1957. But Abdul Ghani was disappointed after failing to win the trophy for his country after Hong Kong emerged as champions. Abdul Ghani managed to overcome his disappointment in 1958 when he helped the national squad won the 1958 Pestabola Merdeka after being the group champions above Hong Kong and Indonesia.

Abdul Ghani then helped Malaya to retain the title Pestabola Merdeka in 1959 after beating Indonesia 2–1. He later received the title 'King of ball' from Football Association of Selangor (FAS), a title later used by anyone to refer to him for his brilliant performance for Malaya.

He completed his hat-trick in the 1960 Pestabola Merdeka. Malaya eventually shared the title with Asian Giants, South Korea. On 15 August 1960, he was selected members to form the AFC Asian All-Stars tour of Europe, which never materialized. In 1961, Abdul Ghani help the national team's to won the gold medal in the 1961 SEAP Games (now SEA Games) in Rangoon, the Burmese (now Myanmar) after beating the Burma in the finals.

Abdul Ghani helped Malaya to won the 1962 Asian Games bronze medal after beating South Vietnam 4–1.

After the defunct of Malaya national team in 1963, a combined team with the combination of players from Federation of Malaya and Singapore under the name of new nation, Malaysia was proposed by Tunku Abdul Rahman to compete at the 1963 Merdeka Tournament. Abdul Ghani was selected as the first captain of Malaysia national team. Abdul Ghani officially retired from international football after the Merdeka Cup in 1966.

== Coaching career ==
After his retirement, he was sent to Japan by the Football Association of Malaysia to attend a FIFA Coaching School being the first ever Malaysian to have an official training from FIFA. He finally received his FIFA coaching license in 1969. He was appointed to be the coach the national team in 1969. Abdul Ghani managed the national team on an on-off basis starting from 1969 Merdeka Tournament. His last involvement with the national is at the 1976 Olympic Games qualification in Jakarta.

After only coaching the national team, he later coached his favourite team, Selangor in 1970. In 1971, he became the first player and coach to win the Malaysia Cup after being the team coach and also playing in the final and the semi-finals. He again led Selangor Malaysia's Cup victory over Perak 3–0 in 1972. He then resigned as coach in 1973 because his main concentration was on business instead of coaching.

10 years later, Abdul Ghani returned as coach for Selangor after replacing Chow Kwai Lam in 1983. But his coaching career with Selangor only lasted three seasons after being sacked after failing to help the team win the Malaysia Cup in 1985 despite the successful season leading Selangor to win the 1984 Malaysia Cup after a 3–1 victory over Pahang. After Abdul Ghani left as coach, he returned doing business.

In 2004, he returned to Selangor but this time as a Coaching Adviser for the Football Association of Selangor (FAS). He later resigned from the Football Association of Selangor and agreed moved to his birthplace and became a Coaching Adviser for Negeri Sembilan. He resigned later around 2007 after 2006–07 Season ended.

== Death ==
He died on 28 September 2012, due to the complications after undergoing coronary bypass surgery at National Heart Institute, in Kuala Lumpur. He left behind wife Puan Sri Tengku Aishah Tengku Ibrahim, two sons and two daughters.

== Career statistics ==
Appearances and goals by national team and year
National team	Year	Apps	Goals
Malaya	1956	4	11
Malaya	1957	7	6
Malaya	1958	12	11
Malaya	1959	11	7
Malaya	1960	5	5
Malaya	1961	9	11
Malaya	1962	9	4
Total		57	58

Scores and results list Malaya's and Malaysia's goal tally first, score column indicates score after each Abdul Ghani goal.

List of international goals scored by Abdul Ghani Minhat
No.	Date	Venue	Opponent	Score	Result	Competition
Malaya goals
1	17 March 1956	Kuala Lumpur, Malaya	Cambodia		9–2	1956 AFC Asian Cup qualification
2	17 March 1956	Kuala Lumpur, Malaya	Cambodia		9–2	1956 AFC Asian Cup qualification
3	17 March 1956	Kuala Lumpur, Malaya	Cambodia		9–2	1956 AFC Asian Cup qualification
4	17 March 1956	Kuala Lumpur, Malaya	Cambodia		9–2	1956 AFC Asian Cup qualification
5	17 March 1956	Kuala Lumpur, Malaya	Cambodia		9–2	1956 AFC Asian Cup qualification
6	17 March 1956	Kuala Lumpur, Malaya	Cambodia		9–2	1956 AFC Asian Cup qualification
7	17 March 1956	Kuala Lumpur, Malaya	Cambodia		9–2	1956 AFC Asian Cup qualification
8	29 April 1956	Phnom Penh, Cambodia	Cambodia		2–3	1956 AFC Asian Cup qualification
9	29 April 1956	Phnom Penh, Cambodia	Cambodia		2–3	1956 AFC Asian Cup qualification
10	24 May 1956	Kuala Lumpur, Malaya	South Vietnam		3–3	1956 AFC Asian Cup qualification
11	24 May 1956	Kuala Lumpur, Malaya	South Vietnam		3–3	1956 AFC Asian Cup qualification
12	12 May 1957	Jalan Besar, Singapore	Singapore		1–1	Friendly
13	1 September 1957	Kuala Lumpur, Malaya	Burma		5–2	1957 Merdeka Tournament
14	4 September 1957	Kuala Lumpur, Malaya	Hong Kong		3–3	1957 Merdeka Tournament
15	4 September 1957	Kuala Lumpur, Malaya	Hong Kong		3–3	1957 Merdeka Tournament
16	7 September 1957	Kuala Lumpur, Malaya	Indonesia		2–4	1957 Merdeka Tournament
17	7 September 1957	Kuala Lumpur, Malaya	Indonesia		2–4	1957 Merdeka Tournament
18	1 March 1958	Kuala Lumpur, Malaya	Singapore		5–2	Friendly
19	1 March 1958	Kuala Lumpur, Malaya	Singapore		5–2	Friendly
20	3 May 1958	Jalan Besar, Singapore	Singapore		3–3	Friendly
21	3 May 1958	Jalan Besar, Singapore	Singapore		3–3	Friendly
22	4 May 1958	Jalan Besar, Singapore	Singapore		3–0	Friendly
23	4 May 1958	Jalan Besar, Singapore	Singapore		3–0	Friendly
24	14 May 1958	Kuala Lumpur, Malaya	Pakistan		4–2	Friendly
25	14 May 1958	Kuala Lumpur, Malaya	Pakistan		4–2	Friendly
26	28 December 1958	Kuala Lumpur, Malaya	Japan		6–2	Friendly
27	28 December 1958	Kuala Lumpur, Malaya	Japan		6–2	Friendly
28	28 December 1958	Kuala Lumpur, Malaya	Japan		6–2	Friendly
29	4 January 1959	George Town, Malaya	Japan		1–3	Friendly
30	22 January 1959	Rangoon, Burma	Burma		4–2	Friendly
31	22 January 1959	Rangoon, Burma	Burma		4–2	Friendly
32	25 January 1959	Rangoon, Burma	Burma		2–3	Friendly
33	11 May 1959	Jalan Besar, Singapore	Singapore		2–10	1960 AFC Asian Cup qualification
34	2 September 1959	Kuala Lumpur, Malaya	South Vietnam		4–3	1959 Merdeka Tournament
35	14 December 1959	Bangkok, Thailand	Thailand		1–3	1959 SEAP Games
36	5 August 1960	Kuala Lumpur, Malaya	Japan		3–0	1960 Merdeka Tournament
37	5 August 1960	Kuala Lumpur, Malaya	Japan		3–0	1960 Merdeka Tournament
38	7 August 1960	Kuala Lumpur, Malaya	Thailand		8–2	1960 Merdeka Tournament
39	7 August 1960	Kuala Lumpur, Malaya	Thailand		8–2	1960 Merdeka Tournament
40	7 August 1960	Kuala Lumpur, Malaya	Thailand		8–2	1960 Merdeka Tournament
41	28 May 1961	Tokyo, Japan	Japan		2–3	Friendly
42	28 May 1961	Tokyo, Japan	Japan		2–3	Friendly
43	2 August 1961	Kuala Lumpur, Malaya	Japan		3–2	1961 Merdeka Tournament
44	5 August 1961	Kuala Lumpur, Malaya	South Vietnam		3–1	1961 Merdeka Tournament
45	9 August 1961	Kuala Lumpur, Malaya	India		1–2	1961 Merdeka Tournament
46	13 August 1961	Kuala Lumpur, Malaya	Indonesia		1–2	1961 Merdeka Tournament
47	12 December 1961	Rangoon, Burma	Cambodia		4–0	1961 SEAP Games
48	12 December 1961	Rangoon, Burma	Cambodia		4–0	1961 SEAP Games
49	13 December 1961	Rangoon, Burma	Burma		2–1	1961 SEAP Games
50	15 December 1961	Rangoon, Burma	Thailand		2–2	1961 SEAP Games
51	16 December 1961	Rangoon, Burma	Burma		2–0	1961 SEAP Games
52	26 August 1962	Jakarta, Indonesia	Philippines		15–1	1962 Asian Games
53	26 August 1962	Jakarta, Indonesia	Philippines		15–1	1962 Asian Games
54	26 August 1962	Jakarta, Indonesia	Philippines		15–1	1962 Asian Games
55	28 August 1962	Jakarta, Indonesia	Indonesia		3–2	1962 Asian Games
56	3 September 1962	Jakarta, Indonesia	South Vietnam		4–1	1962 Asian Games
57	8 September 1962	Kuala Lumpur, Malaya	Japan		2–2	1962 Merdeka Tournament
58	13 Septebemr 1962	Kuala Lumpur, Malaya	Burma		3–2	1962 Merdeka Tournament
Malaysia goals
1	8 August 1963	Kuala Lumpur, Malaya	Japan		3–4	1963 Merdeka Tournament
2	8 August 1963	Kuala Lumpur, Malaya	Japan		3–4	1963 Merdeka Tournament
3	7 December 1963	Saigon, South Vietnam	South Vietnam		3–5	1964 AFC Asian Cup qualification

== Honours ==
=== As player ===
Selangor

- HMS Malaya Cup:

Winners (7): 1956, 1959, 1961, 1962, 1963, 1966, 1968

- FAM Cup

Winners (6): 1953, 1954, 1960, 1962, 1961, 1962

- Asian Champion Club Tournament:

Runners-up: 1967

Malaya

- Merdeka Tournament:

Winners (3): 1958, 1959, 1960

- Southeast Asian Peninsular Games

Gold Medal: 1961

- Asian Games

Bronze Medal: 1962

=== Coach ===
Selangor

- Malaysia Cup

Winners (3): 1971, 1972, 1984

Malaysia

- King's Cup

Winners (1): 1972

- Merdeka Tournament

Winners (1): 1973

Malaysia B

- South Vietnam Independence Cup

Winners (1): 1971

=== Individual ===
- 1956 AFC Asian Cup qualification top scorer: 10 goals
- FAS King of ball (Raja Bola) Award: 1959
- National Sportsman: 1959
- OCM Hall of Fame: 2004
- FAM Special Award: 2012
- Goal.com The best Malaysia XI of all time: 2020
- IFFHS Men's All Time Malaysia Dream Team: 2022

=== Records ===
- Malaya all-time top scorer: 58 goals
- The first player from outside Europe and the first player from Asia to reach 50 goals for men's national teams: 15 December 1961
- The fifth player to reach 50 goals for men's national teams after Imre Schlosser(1917), Poul Nielsen(1925), Ferenc Puskás(1952) and Sándor Kocsis(1954): 1961
- The longest international scoring series: 11 Matches in 1961-1962, equalled by Erling Haaland in 2024-2025 ongoing
- One of the five players who had averages more than one goal per match in international and having scored more than 50 goals after Sandor Kocsis with 75 goals in 68 matches (1.1), Gerd Müller with 68 goals in 62 matches (1.1), Erling Haaland with 55 goals in 48 matches (1.15) and Poul Nielsen with 52 goals in 38 matches (1.37): 58 goals in 57 matches (1.02)
- One of the three players who had scored four goals in a Malaysia Cup final after Lee Ah Loke(1952) and N. Thanabalan(1968): 1963

=== Orders ===
- Malaysia
  - Member of the Order of the Defender of the Realm (AMN) (1967)
  - Commander of the Order of Meritorious Service (PJN) – Datuk (2009)
  - Commander of the Order of Loyalty to the Crown of Malaysia (PSM) – Tan Sri (2012)
- Pahang
  - Knight Companion of the Order of the Crown of Pahang (DIMP) – Dato' (2000)
- Selangor
  - Knight Companion of the Order of Sultan Salahuddin Abdul Aziz Shah (DSSA) – Dato' (2001)

== See also ==
- List of men's footballers with 50 or more international goals
