= Football at the 1959 SEAP Games =

Football at the 1959 Southeast Asian Peninsular Games
- Venue: 1 (in 1 host city)
- Dates: 13 December - 17 December 1959
- Nations: 4

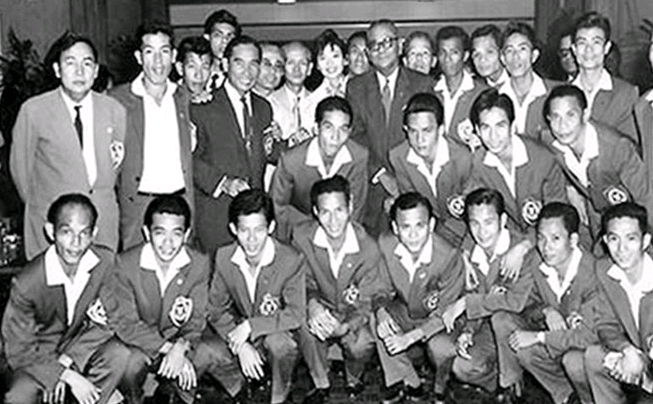
The South Vietnam team winning gold at the 1959 Southeast Asian Peninsular Games

Football was contested as part of the programme for the 1959 Southeast Asian Peninsular Games which was hosted in Bangkok, Thailand from 12 to 17 December 1959. It was the inaugural edition of the men's football tournament at the multi-sport event organised by the SEAP Games Federation Committee.

The football tournament began with the first matches of the group stage on 13 December 1959 and ended with the gold medal match on 17 December 1959. Hosts Thailand and South Vietnam contested the final. South Vietnam defeated Thailand 3–1 to win the gold medal.

== Background ==
The first edition of the South East Asian Peninsular Games was held in Bangkok, Thailand.

== Format ==
In total, four teams took part in the competition. They contested a single round robin group. The group winners and runners-up would contest the final.

=== Participants ===
- Burma
- Malaya
- South Vietnam
- Thailand

== Venue ==
Matches were played at the National Stadium in Bangkok, Thailand.

Bangkok is located in Thailand	Bangkok
Bangkok is located in Thailand	National Stadium
Bangkok is located in Thailand	Capacity: 20,000

== Group stage ==
The group stage began on 13 December 1959. Robert Choe scored twice as Malaya defeated Burma 2–1 and South Vietnam recorded a 4–0 win against Thailand in the opening round of matches. The following day, South Vietnam defeated Burma 3–0 and a brace from Prathet Sutabutra helped Thailand to a 3–1 win against Malaya. With one round of matches left, South Vietnam were top of the standings with four points, two clear of Thailand and Malaya. In the final round of matches on 15 December, Malaya defeated South Vietnam and Thailand won 5–2 against Burma. South Vietnam and Thailand advanced to the gold medal match.

=== Table ===
Pos	Team	Pld	W	D	L	GF	GA	GD	Pts	Qualification
1	South Vietnam	3	2	0	1	8	2	+6	4	Advance to final
2	Thailand	3	2	0	1	8	7	+1	4	Advance to final
3	Malaya	3	2	0	1	5	5	0	4	
4	Burma	3	0	0	3	3	10	−7	0	

=== Matches ===
13 December 1959

Malaya	2–1	Burma
Choe 60' (pen.), 62'		Sunny Tin Tun 42'

National Stadium, Bangkok
13 December 1959

South Vietnam	4–0	Thailand

National Stadium, Bangkok

14 December 1959

South Vietnam	3–0	Burma

National Stadium, Bangkok
14 December 1959

Thailand	3–1	Malaya
Nakorn 30'; Sutabutra 51', 53'		Ghani 24'

National Stadium, Bangkok
Attendance: 25,000
Referee: Poh Hwa Oei (Malaysia)

15 December 1959

Malaya	2–1	South Vietnam
Choe; Ghani 53'		Đỗ Thới Vinh 24'

National Stadium, Bangkok
15 December 1959

Thailand	5–2	Burma

National Stadium, Bangkok

== Gold medal match ==
South Vietnam defeated Thailand 3–1 to win the gold medal.

17 December 1959

South Vietnam	3–1	Thailand
Đỗ Thới Vinh 21'; Đỗ Quang Thách 40'; Unknown		Sunthan 31'

National Stadium, Bangkok
