= M. Chandran (footballer) =

Malaysian footballer (1942–2019)

Chandran a/l Mutveeran
Personal information
- Date of birth: 4 May 1942
- Place of birth: Sungai Siput, Perak, Federated Malay States
- Date of death: 28 September 2019 (aged 77)
- Place of death: Ampang, Selangor, Malaysia
- Position: Defender

Senior career*
Years	Team	Apps	(Gls)
1962–1975	Selangor FA		

International career
1965–1974	Malaysia	122	(2)

Managerial career
- 1975–1978: Selangor
- 1982–1983: Malaysia
- 1986–1988: Selangor
- 1988: Malaysia
- 1992: Selangor
- * Club domestic league appearances and goals

Datuk Chandran Mutveeran, popularly known as M. Chandran (4 May 1942 – 28 September 2019), was a Malaysian footballer.

== Playing and coaching career ==
As a player, he mainly played for Selangor FA, winning trophies for his team and establishing himself as the playmaker. He together with the late Abdul Ghani Minhat also helped Selangor to become runners-up in the 1967 Asian Champion Club Tournament.

As a member of Malaysia national team, he competed in the men's tournament at the 1972 Summer Olympics and featured in all three group matches.

After retiring, he coached Selangor and Malaysia. On 11 May 1975, M.Chandran led Malaysia Selection against Arsenal FC in a friendly match. Spearheaded by Mokhtar Dahari up front, the selection team embarrassed Arsenal by 2-0 at Merdeka Stadium.

M. Chandran was awarded with Datuk title by Sultan of Pahang in 2000 (who was coincidentally the President of Football Association of Malaysia (FAM) at that time) for his contributions to Malaysian football.

In 2006, he suffered a stroke but kept active as a coach and was on the FAM technical committee at various points.

On 17 September 2014, FourFourTwo included him on their list of the top 25 Malaysian footballers of all time.

== Death ==
He died at his home in Ampang, Selangor, on 28 September 2019.

== Career statistics ==
=== International goals ===
#	Date	Venue	Opponent	Score	Result	Competition
1.	11 December 1967	Kuala Lumpur, Malaysia	Burma	1–2	1–2	1967 Sea Games
2.	24 November 1967	Bangkok, Thailand	Laos	1–0	5–0	1968 King's Cup

== Honours ==
=== Player ===
- Asian Games bronze medal: 1974
- Merdeka Tournament: 1968, 1973
- Malaysia Cup: 1962, 1963, 1966, 1968, 1969, 1971, 1972, 1973, 1975
- Asian Club Championship runner-up: 1967
- AFC Asian All Stars: 1968
- OCM Hall of Fame: 2004
- IFFHS Men’s All Time Malaysia Dream Team: 2022

=== Head coach ===
- Malaysia Cup: 1975, 1976, 1978, 1986

=== Orders ===
- Malaysia
  - Member of the Order of the Defender of the Realm (AMN)
- Pahang
  - Knight Companion of the Order of the Crown of Pahang (DIMP) – Dato'
- Selangor
  - Recipient of the Meritorious Service Medal (PJK)

== See also ==
- List of men's footballers with 100 or more international caps
