= 1960 AFC Asian Cup qualification =

Tournament details
- Dates: 29 March – 18 December 1959
- Teams: 10 (from 1 confederation)

Tournament statistics
- Matches played: 18
- Goals scored: 79 (4.39 per match)
- Attendance: 337,744 (18,764 per match)

The qualification for the 1960 AFC Asian Cup consisted of 10 teams in three zones with the winners of each zone joining South Korea in the final tournament.

== Zones ==
| Central zone | Eastern zone | Western zone |
|---|---|---|
| ~~Burma~~ * ~~Cambodia~~ * ~~Indonesia~~ ** Malaya; Singapore; South Vietnam; ~~Thailand~~ * | Hong Kong; ~~Japan~~ * Philippines; Taiwan | ~~Afghanistan~~ * ~~Ceylon~~ * India; Iran; Israel; ~~Nepal~~ * Pakistan |

- * Withdrew
- ** Indonesia declined to participate due to an AFC membership dispute.

== Central zone ==
All matches held in Singapore.

| Pos | Team | Pld | W | D | L | GF | GA | GD | Pts | Qualification |
|---|---|---|---|---|---|---|---|---|---|---|
| 1 | South Vietnam | 2 | 2 | 0 | 0 | 5 | 1 | +4 | 4 | 1960 AFC Asian Cup |
| 2 | Malaya | 2 | 1 | 0 | 1 | 5 | 3 | +2 | 2 | |
| 3 | Singapore (H) | 2 | 0 | 0 | 2 | 3 | 9 | −6 | 0 | |

9 May 1959
20:00 (UTC+8)

| Singapore | 1–4 | South Vietnam |
|---|---|---|
| Zainol 51' (pen.) | | Đỗ Thới Vinh 42', 53'; Nguyễn Ngọc Thanh 57'; Nguyễn Văn Tư 66' |

Jalan Besar Stadium, Singapore
Attendance: 4,538
Referee: S. M. Arnott (Malaya)

11 May 1959
20:00 (UTC+8)

| Singapore | 2–5 | Malaya |
|---|---|---|
| Yusoff 32', 55' | | Ghani 4'; Choe 10', 73'; Boon Bee 38'; Wah Chin 65' (o.g.) |

Jalan Besar Stadium, Singapore
Attendance: 3,400
Referee: A. W. Henderson-Thynne (Malaya)

13 May 1959
20:00 (UTC+8)

| South Vietnam | 1–0 | Malaya |
|---|---|---|
| Hà Tam 4' |

Jalan Besar Stadium, Singapore
Attendance: 9,806
Referee: John Ferguson (Singapore)

== Eastern zone ==
All matches held in Philippines.

| Pos | Team | Pld | W | D | L | GF | GA | GD | Pts | Qualification |
|---|---|---|---|---|---|---|---|---|---|---|
| 1 | Taiwan | 2 | 2 | 0 | 0 | 14 | 8 | +6 | 4 | 1960 AFC Asian Cup |
| 2 | Hong Kong | 2 | 1 | 0 | 1 | 11 | 7 | +4 | 2 | |
| 3 | Philippines (H) | 2 | 0 | 0 | 2 | 4 | 14 | −10 | 0 | |

29 March 1959

| Philippines | 0–7 | Hong Kong |
|---|---|---|
| | | Lau Chi Lam 5', 21', 39'; Lau Kai Cheung 15'; Leung Wai Hung 20'; Ho Cheung Yau (?) |

Rizal Memorial Stadium, Manila
Attendance: 10,000

31 March 1959

| Philippines | 4–7 | Taiwan |

Rizal Memorial Stadium, Manila
Attendance: 12,000

3 April 1959

| Taiwan | 7–4 | Hong Kong |
|---|---|---|
| Law Kwok-tai 8', 11', 62'; Lam Sheung Yee 16'; Yang Wei Yu 36', 49'; Huang Zhi Qiang 55' |

Rizal Memorial Stadium, Manila
Attendance: 22,000

== Western zone ==
All matches held in India.

| Pos | Team | Pld | W | D | L | GF | GA | GD | Pts | Qualification |
|---|---|---|---|---|---|---|---|---|---|---|
| 1 | Israel | 6 | 3 | 2 | 1 | 10 | 8 | +2 | 8 | 1960 AFC Asian Cup |
| 2 | Iran | 6 | 3 | 1 | 2 | 12 | 10 | +2 | 7 | |
| 3 | Pakistan | 6 | 2 | 1 | 3 | 8 | 10 | −2 | 5 | |
| 4 | India (H) | 6 | 2 | 0 | 4 | 7 | 9 | −2 | 4 | |

5 December 1959

| Israel | 0–3 | Iran |
|---|---|---|
| | Report | Hajari 49'; Barmaki 59'; Dehdari 65' |

Maharaja College Stadium, Ernakulam
Attendance: 30,000
Referee: Pratul Chakravarthy (India)

7 December 1959

| India | 1–0 | Pakistan |
|---|---|---|
| D'Souza 35' | Report |

Maharaja College Stadium, Ernakulam
Attendance: 30,000

8 December 1959

| India | 1–3 | Israel |
|---|---|---|
| Devdas 60' | Report | R. Levi 35', 43', 53' |

Maharaja College Stadium, Ernakulam
Attendance: 30,000

9 December 1959

| Pakistan | 4–1 | Iran |
|---|---|---|
| Umer 21', 35', 37'; Hussain 28' | Report | Mokhtar 10' |

Maharaja College Stadium, Ernakulam
Attendance: 15,000
Referee: T. R. Govindasamy (India)

10 December 1959

| Israel | 2–0 | Pakistan |
|---|---|---|
| R. Levi 55'; Stelmach 65' | Report |

Maharaja College Stadium, Ernakulam
Attendance: 15,000
Referee: Pratul Chakravarthy (India)

11 December 1959

| India | 3–1 | Iran |
|---|---|---|
| Goswami 64'; Khan 66' (pen.); Balaram 80' | Report | Dehdari 62' |

Maharaja College Stadium, Ernakulam
Attendance: 20,000
Referee: Masudur Rahman (Pakistan)

12 December 1959

| Israel | 1–1 | Iran |
|---|---|---|
| Menchel 9' | Report | Hajari 49' |

Maharaja College Stadium, Ernakulam
Attendance: 15,000
Referee: Pratul Chakravarthy (India)

13 December 1959

| India | 0–1 | Pakistan |
|---|---|---|
| | Report | Abdullah 53' |

Maharaja College Stadium, Ernakulam
Attendance: 30,000

14 December 1959

| Iran | 4–1 | Pakistan |
|---|---|---|
| Abbas Hajari; Jamali | Report | Qayyum (?) |

Maharaja College Stadium, Ernakulam
Attendance: 16,000

16 December 1959

| India | 1–2 | Israel |
|---|---|---|
| Rahmatullah 19' | Report | Stelmach 11'; R. Levi 75' |

Maharaja College Stadium, Ernakulam
Attendance: 35,000
Referee: Natarajan (Malaya)

17 December 1959

| Pakistan | 2–2 | Israel |
|---|---|---|
| Umer 49'; Ghafoor 57' | Report | Menchel 60'; Ratzabi 68' |

Maharaja College Stadium, Ernakulam
Attendance: 15,000
Referee: Angarai Jayaraman (India)

18 December 1959

| India | 1–2 | Iran |
|---|---|---|
| Khan 64' | Report | Dehdari 27', 57' |

Maharaja College Stadium, Ernakulam
Attendance: 25,000

== Qualified teams ==
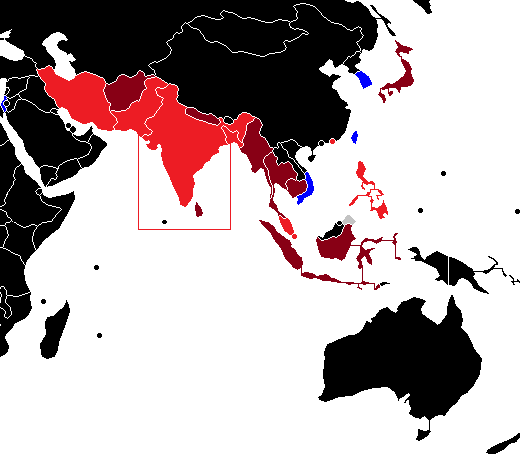
Qualified Did not qualify Withdrew before playing any matches Did not enter Not an AFC member

| Team | Qualified as | Qualified on | Previous appearance |
|---|---|---|---|
| South Korea | Hosts | N/A | 1 (1956) |
| South Vietnam | Central Zone winners | 13 May 1959 | 1 (1956) |
| Taiwan | Eastern zone winners | 3 April 1959 | 0 (debut) |
| Israel | Western Zone winners | 17 December 1959 | 1 (1956) |

=== Goalscorers ===
There were 79 goals scored in 18 matches, for an average of 4.39 goals per match.

5 goals

- (Iran) Abbas Hajari
- (Israel) Rafi Levi

4 goals

- (Iran) Parviz Dehdari
- (Pakistan) Muhammad Umer

3 goals

- (Hong Kong) Lau Chi Lam
- (Taiwan) Law Kwok-tai

2 goals

- (Hong Kong) Ho Cheung Yau
- (India) Yousuf Khan
- (Israel) Avraham Menchel
- (Israel) Nahum Stelmach
- (Federation of Malaya) Robert Choe
- (Singapore) Ismail Yusoff
- (South Vietnam) Đỗ Thới Vinh
- (Taiwan) Yang Wei Yu

1 goal

- (Hong Kong) Lau Kai Cheung
- (Hong Kong) Leung Wai Hung
- (India) Chuni Goswami
- (India) Derek D'Souza
- (India) Mohammed Rahmatullah
- (India) Mundiyath Devdas
- (India) Tulsidas Balaram
- (Iran) Hamid Barmaki
- (Iran) Kambozia Jamali
- (Iran) Nasser Haji Mokhtar
- (Israel) Zecharia Ratzabi
- (Federation of Malaya) Abdul Ghani Minhat
- (Federation of Malaya) Ng Boon Bee
- (Pakistan) Abdul Ghafoor
- (Pakistan) Abdullah Rahi
- (Pakistan) Faqir Hussain
- (Pakistan) Qayyum Changezi
- (Singapore) Dollah Zainol
- (South Vietnam) Hà Tam
- (South Vietnam) Nguyễn Ngọc Thanh
- (South Vietnam) Nguyễn Văn Tư
- (Taiwan) Lam Sheung Yee
- (Taiwan) Huang Zhi Qiang

1 own goal

- (Singapore) Wah Chin
