= Robert Choe =

Malaysian footballer (1940–2025)

Robert Choe (13 January 1940 – 21 January 2025) was a Malaysian footballer who made appearances for Malacca FA and the national team during the 1950s and 1960s.

== Career ==
A forward, Choe was a squad player for Malaya that captured the 1958, 1959 and 1960 Merdeka Tournament editions.

In 1959, Choe was selected for the inaugural Asian Youth Championship. On 16 December 1961, he helped the national team win the gold medal in the 1961 SEAP Games (now SEA Games) in Rangoon, the Burmese (now Myanmar) after beating the Burma in the finals.

He was also a part of the Malaya team that won bronze medals in the 1962 Asian Games.

In 1962, he was also offered by Eintracht Frankfurt and Tottenham Hotspur (along with Abdul Ghani Minhat) to attend a trial session.

At the 1966 Asian Games in Bangkok, Choe was honoured to captain the national squad before announcing his retirement from the international stage at the age of 26 to focus on a career as a banker.

== Personal life and death ==
Choe was a Baba-Nyonya descendant. On 24 October 1964, after marrying Alice Choe, the couple had a pair of sons, Fahrian Choe Choon Huah and Timothy Choe Choon Seng. Fahrian was named after Germany's goalkeeper at the 1962 World Cup, Wolfgang Fahrian, who became Choe's friend when travelling to Europe. "Fahrian was happy to know that I named my first child after him," said Robert. Choe died on 21 January 2025, at the age of 85.

== Honours ==
Malacca

- Malaysia FAM Cup runner-up: 1957, 1958

Malaysia U19

- AFC Youth Championship runner-up: 1959, 1960

Malaysia

- SEAP Games: 1961
- Asian Games: Bronze Medal 1962
- Pestabola Merdeka: 1958, 1959, 1960
