= Trần Văn Nhung =

Vietnamese footballer (1933–2020)

Personal information
- Full name: Trần Văn Nhung
- Date of birth: 1933
- Place of birth: Hóc Môn, French Cochinchina
- Date of death: 10 October 2020 (aged 87)
- Place of death: Ho Chi Minh City, Vietnam
- Height: 1.60 m (5 ft 3 in)
- Positions: Forward; right winger

Youth career
- –1949: Cercle Sportif Saïgonnais

Senior career*
Years	Team	Apps	(Gls)
1949–1952	Cercle Sportif Saïgonnais		
1952–1974	Association de la Jeunesse sportive		

International career
1950–1964	South Vietnam	8+	(4+)
- * Club domestic league appearances and goals

Trần Văn Nhung (1933 – 10 October 2020), also known as Pierre, was a Vietnamese footballer who played as a forward and right winger for the South Vietnam national team. He was nicknamed "The Divine Horse" because of his acceleration.

== Club career ==
Born in the Hóc Môn district of Saigon in 1933, Nhung initially held French citizenship. Upon Vietnamese independence, he kept the name Pierre. Following the 1954 Geneva Conference, where the French were order to withdraw from Vietnam, he was offered the chance to play football in France, but declined and stayed in South Vietnam.

He joined the Cercle Sportif Saïgonnais when he was young. In 1952, he joined Association de la Jeunesse sportive, where he retired in late 1974.

== International career ==
Nhung made his debut for the South Vietnam national team in 1950, at the age of 17. He was part of the South Vietnam squads at both the 1956 and 1960 AFC Asian Cups, as well as at the 1959 SEAP Games, where he helped them win a gold medal in the football tournament, the 1954 and 1962 Asian Games, and 1964 Summer Olympics qualifiers. He retired from the national team following the Olympics qualifiers, to make way for younger South Vietnamese players.

== Death ==
Nhung died in the morning of 10 October 2020, at the age of 87, following a battle with a serious illness. He was one of the last member of South Vietnam's 1959 SEAP Games gold medal-winning squad to pass away.
