= Choi Jung-min =

South Korean swimmer

Personal information
- Born: 12 January 1998 (age 28)

Sport
- Sport: Swimming
- Strokes: freestyle

- Choi Jung-min
- Hangul: 최정민
- RR: Choe Jeongmin
- MR: Ch'oe Chŏngmin

Choi Jung-min (born 12 January 1998) is a South Korean swimmer. She competed in the women's 800 metre freestyle event at the 2017 World Aquatics Championships.
