= Sung Nak-woon =

South Korean footballer

Sung Nak-Woon 성낙운
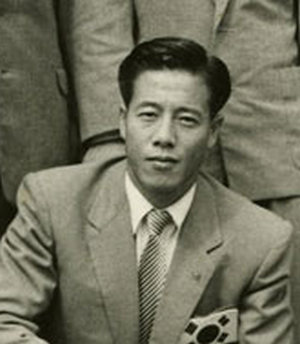
- Sung in 1954

Personal information
- Date of birth: 2 February 1926
- Place of birth: Korea, Empire of Japan
- Date of death: 28 May 1997 (aged 71)
- Place of death: Seoul, South Korea
- Position: Forward

Senior career*
| Years | Team | Apps | (Gls) |
- Seoul Football Club

International career
- South Korea
Medal record
Representing South Korea
Men's football
AFC Asian Cup
| Gold medal – first place | 1956 Hong Kong | Team |
- * Club domestic league appearances and goals

Sung Nak-Woon (Korean: 성낙운; Hanja: 成樂雲, 2 February 1926 – 28 May 1997) was a South Korean football forward who played for the South Korea in the 1954 FIFA World Cup. He also played for Seoul Football Club.
