= 1964 AFC Asian Cup qualification =

Tournament details
- Dates: 7 – 14 December 1963
- Teams: 4 (from 1 confederation)

Tournament statistics
- Matches played: 6
- Goals scored: 33 (5.5 per match)

The qualification for the 1964 AFC Asian Cup consisted of 6 teams in four zones. The winner of each group would join hosts Israel in the final tournament.

== Zones ==
Central zone 1	Central zone 2	Eastern zone	Western zone
~~Myanmar~~ * Malaysia ** ~~Pakistan~~ * ~~Singapore~~ *	~~Cambodia~~ * Hong Kong; ~~Indonesia~~ * South Vietnam; Thailand	~~Japan~~ * ~~Philippines~~ * ~~Taiwan~~ * South Korea	~~Afghanistan~~ * ~~Ceylon~~ * India; ~~Iran~~ *

- * Withdrew
- ** Moved to Central group 2

== Central zone ==
All matches held in South Vietnam.

Pos	Team	Pld	W	D	L	GF	GA	GD	Pts	Qualification
1	Hong Kong	3	2	1	0	11	7	+4	5	1964 AFC Asian Cup
2	South Vietnam (H)	3	2	0	1	9	7	+2	4	
3	Malaysia	3	1	0	2	9	10	−1	2	
4	Thailand	3	0	1	2	4	9	−5	1	

7 December 1963

Hong Kong	3–3	Thailand

Cộng Hòa Stadium, Saigon
Attendance: 15,000

7 December 1963

South Vietnam	5–3	Malaysia

Cộng Hòa Stadium, Saigon

11 December 1963

Malaysia	3–1	Thailand
Hamid 14' (?); Choe 18'		Nanongkai (?)

Cộng Hòa Stadium, Saigon
Referee: Enrique Cuatico (Philippines)

11 December 1963

South Vietnam	1–4	Hong Kong

Cộng Hòa Stadium, Saigon

14 December 1963

Hong Kong	4–3	Malaysia
(?); Law Kwai Sang 88' (pen.)		(?)

Cộng Hòa Stadium, Saigon

14 December 1963

South Vietnam	3–0	Thailand

Cộng Hòa Stadium, Saigon

== Eastern zone ==
All the others withdrew, so South Korea qualified automatically.

== Western zone ==
All the others withdrew, so India qualified automatically.

== Qualified teams ==
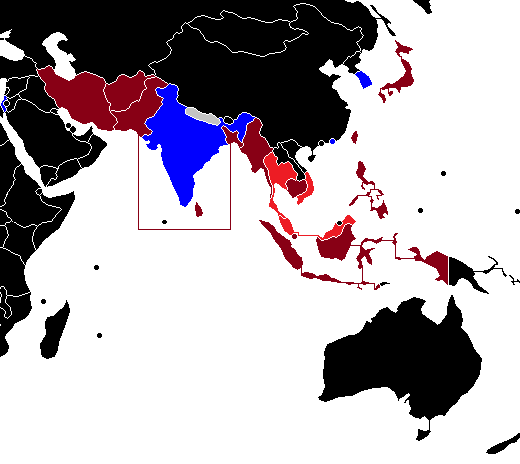
Qualified Did not qualify Withdrew before playing any matches Did not enter Not an AFC member

Team	Qualified as	Qualified on	Previous appearance
Israel	Hosts	N/A	2 (1956, 1960)
Hong Kong	Central Zone winners	14 December 1963	1 (1956)
South Korea	Eastern zone winners (automatically qualified)	1963	2 (1956, 1960)
India	Western Zone winners (automatically qualified)	1963	0 (debut)

=== Goalscorers ===
There were 33 goals scored in 6 matches, for an average of 5.5 goals per match.

2 goals

- (Malaysia) Yusef Hamid

1 goal

- (Hong Kong) Law Kwai Sang
- (Malaysia) Robert Choe
- (Thailand) Yanyong Nanongkai
