= 1956 AFC Asian Cup =

Asian Cup Hong Kong 1956 1956年亞洲盃足球賽
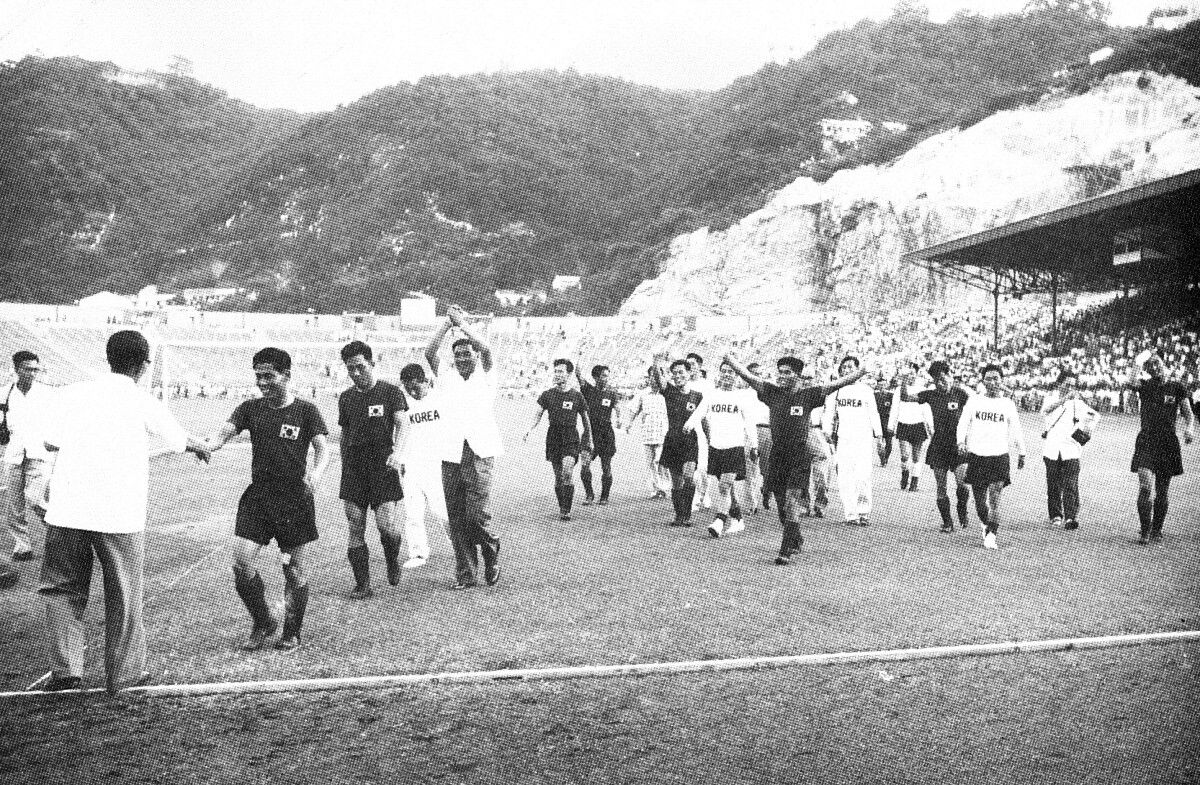
- South Korea, the winner of 1956 AFC Asian Cup, at Hong Kong Stadium

Tournament details
- Host country: Hong Kong
- Dates: 1–15 September
- Teams: 4
- Venue: 1 (in 1 host city)

Final positions
- Champions: South Korea (1st title)
- Runners-up: Israel
- Third place: Hong Kong
- Fourth place: South Vietnam

Tournament statistics
- Matches played: 6
- Goals scored: 27 (4.5 per match)
- Attendance: 121,000 (20,167 per match)
- Top scorer(s): (Israel) Nahum Stelmach (4 goals)

The 1956 AFC Asian Cup (Yue Chinese: 1956年亞洲盃足球賽) was the inaugural international association football championship for members of the Asian Football Confederation (AFC). Hosted by Hong Kong, the competition ran from 1 to 14 September 1956 and was contested by the national teams of Hong Kong, Israel, South Korea and South Vietnam.

Played as a round-robin tournament, matches were only 80 minutes long and, if drawn, were initially supposed to have 30 minutes of extra time. However, due to bad light, all matches ended at full time and no extra time was played. South Korea were crowned champions of the inaugural competition after defeating South Vietnam 5–3 in the final and decisive match.

== Background ==
On 8 May 1954, football delegates from countries present at the 1954 Asian Games in Manila, Philippines met and founded the Asian Football Confederation (AFC). Hosting rights for the first AFC Asian Cup were awarded to Hong Kong and the competition was organised to be held in 1956.

== Qualification ==
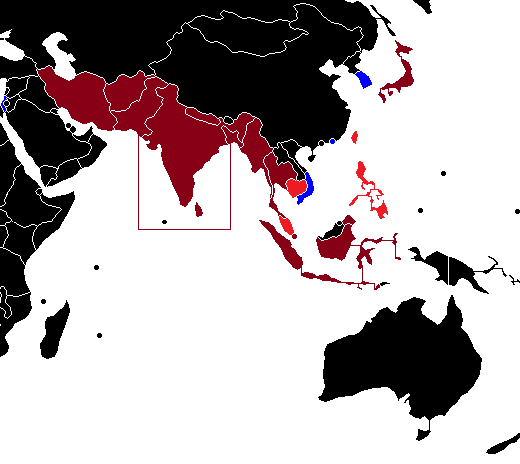
Qualified Did not qualify Withdrew before playing any matches Did not enter Not an AFC member

Hong Kong qualified automatically as hosts. In total, 20 teams were included in the qualifying draw – a number of whom were not AFC members at the time but would go on to join the confederation. Teams were split geographically into an eastern, western and central zone and would play a series of two-legged ties to determine one qualifier from each zone.

Most entrants withdrew without playing a match. Israel qualified by default after the other seven teams in the western zone withdrew. South Vietnam qualified from the central zone after three of the seven teams withdrew. In the eastern zone, South Korea qualified after two of the five teams withdrew.

=== Participants ===
Nations qualified for the 1956 AFC Asian Cup
Team	Qualified as	Qualified on
Hong Kong	Hosts	N/A
South Vietnam	Central zone winners	24 May 1956
South Korea	Eastern zone winners	2 September 1956
Israel	Western zone winners	1956

== Format ==
The four teams contested a single round robin group. Matches lasted only 80 minutes and were played as two halves of 40 minutes. Extra time of 30 minutes was due to be played in the case of drawn matches but, due to bad light, no extra time was played.

== Venue ==
All matches were played at Government Stadium in Hong Kong.

Hong Kong is located in Hong Kong	Hong Kong
Hong Kong is located in Hong Kong	Government Stadium
Hong Kong is located in Hong Kong	Capacity: 28,000

== Summary ==
The competition began on 1 September 1956 when Israel defeated Hong Kong 3–2 in the opening match. Five days later, South Korea drew 2–2 with Hong Kong. On 8 September, South Korea defeated Israel 2–1. With half the games played, South Korea had three points, Israel two points and Hong Kong one point while South Vietnam had yet to play a match. The following day, South Vietnam drew 2–2 with Hong Kong in their first match. On 12 September, in the penultimate match of the competition, Israel defeated South Vietnam to go top of the standings. Three days later, in the final and ultimately decisive match, South Korea recorded a 5–3 win against South Vietnam as they won the competition.

== Table ==
Pos	Team	Pld	W	D	L	GF	GA	GD	Pts	Qualification
1	South Korea	3	2	1	0	9	6	+3	5	Champions
2	Israel	3	2	0	1	6	5	+1	4	Runners-up
3	Hong Kong	3	0	2	1	6	7	−1	2	Third place
4	South Vietnam	3	0	1	2	6	9	−3	1	Fourth place

== Matches ==
1 September 1956
17:45

Hong Kong	2–3	Israel
Au Chi Yin 12', 66'		Glazer 37', 76'; Stelmach 74'

Government Stadium, Hong Kong
Attendance: 30,000
Referee: Harold Arthur Sheppard (England)

6 September 1956
18:00

South Korea	2–2	Hong Kong
Kim Ji-sung 45'; Sung Nak-woon 62'		Tang Yee Kit 10'; Ko Po Keung 25'

Government Stadium, Hong Kong
Attendance: 30,000
Referee: Reuven Priesner (Israel)

8 September 1956
17:45

Israel	1–2	South Korea
Stelmach 71'		Woo Sang-kwon 53'; Sung Nak-woon 65'

Government Stadium, Hong Kong
Attendance: 20,000
Referee: Trương Văn Ký (South Vietnam)

9 September 1956
17:45

South Vietnam	2–2	Hong Kong
Trần Văn Nhung 30'; Lê Hữu Đức 64'		Chu Wing Wah 59' (pen.); Lau Chi Lam 79'

Government Stadium, Hong kong
Attendance: 30,000
Referee: Sung Hee-do (South Korea)

12 September 1956
18:00

Israel	2–1	South Vietnam
Stelmach 14', 27'		Trần Văn Nhung 58'

Government Stadium, Hong kong
Attendance: 15,000
Referee: Richard Tucker (Hong Kong)

15 September 1956
17:45

South Korea	5–3	South Vietnam
Sung Nak-woon 5'; Woo Sang-kwon 41' (pen.), 58'; Choi Jung-min 57', 66'		Nguyễn Văn Cụt 20' (pen.); Lê Hữu Đức 51', 63'

Government Stadium, Hong kong
Attendance: 11,000
Referee: Fred Minta (Hong Kong)

== Goalscorers ==
There were 27 goals scored in 6 matches, for an average of 4.5 goals per match.

4 goals

- (Israel) Nahum Stelmach

3 goals

- (South Korea) Sung Nak-woon
- (South Korea) Woo Sang-kwon
- (South Vietnam) Lê Hữu Đức

2 goals

- (Hong Kong) Au Chi Yin
- (Israel) Yehoshua Glazer
- (South Korea) Choi Chung-min
- (South Vietnam) Trần Văn Nhung

1 goal

- (Hong Kong) Chu Wing Wah
- (Hong Kong) Ko Po Keung
- (Hong Kong) Lau Chi Lam
- (Hong Kong) Tang Yee Kit
- (South Korea) Kim Ji-sung
- (South Vietnam) Nguyễn Văn Cụt
