= List of South Korea national football team managers =

The following is a list of South Korea national football team managers, first established in June 1948 with the appointment of Park Chung-hwi.

== Manager history ==
As of 17 November 2026

A total of 47 managers managed South Korea during 74 appointments (excluding caretaker managers).

South Korean managers initially managed the national team as a sideline, but in 1992 the Korea Football Association adopted a policy that only full-time managers could manage the national team.

=== Adjunct managers (1948–1991) ===
No.	Manager	From	To	P	W	D	L	Win %	Competition(s)
1	(South Korea) Park Chung-hwi	June 1948	June 1948	0	0	0	0	—	—
2	(South Korea) Lee Young-min	June 1948	August 1948	2	1	0	1	50.00	1948 Summer Olympics quarter-finals
3	(South Korea) Lee Yoo-hyung	December 1948	February 1949	2	1	1	0	50.00	—
4	(South Korea) Kim Hwa-jip	March 1950	April 1950	3	2	0	1	66.67	—
5	(South Korea) Kim Yong-sik	April 1953	May 1953	5	3	1	1	60.00	—
6	(South Korea) Bae Jong-ho	February 1954	May 1954	6	2	3	1	33.33	1954 Asian Games silver medal
7	(South Korea) Kim Yong-sik	May 1954	June 1954	2	0	0	2	0.00	1954 FIFA World Cup group stage
8	(South Korea) Chu Yung-kwang	February 1956	June 1956	6	5	0	1	83.33	—
9	(South Korea) Kim Sung-gan	August 1956	October 1956	4	3	1	0	75.00	1956 AFC Asian Cup champion
10	(South Korea) Kim Kyu-hwan	January 1958	March 1958	2	0	1	1	0.00	—
11	(South Korea) Min Byung-dae	April 1958	June 1958	5	4	0	1	80.00	1958 Asian Games silver medal
12	(South Korea) Chung Nam-sik	July 1959	September 1959	9	6	2	1	66.67	—
13	(South Korea) Kim Yong-sik	November 1959	December 1959	2	1	0	1	50.00	—
14	(South Korea) Min Byung-dae	February 1960	April 1960	2	1	0	1	50.00	—
15	(South Korea) Chu Yung-kwang	July 1960	September 1960	5	2	3	0	40.00	—
16	(South Korea) Kim Yong-sik	September 1960	June 1961	5	5	0	0	100.00	1960 AFC Asian Cup champion
17	(South Korea) Kim Kyu-hwan	September 1961	March 1962	5	1	1	3	20.00	—
18	(South Korea) Min Byung-dae	May 1962	June 1962	0	0	0	0	—	—
19	(South Korea) Kim Kyu-hwan	July 1962	October 1962	7	6	0	1	85.71	1962 Asian Games silver medal
20	(South Korea) Park Kyu-chung	July 1963	September 1963	7	3	2	2	42.86	—
21	(South Korea) Min Byung-dae	October 1963	December 1963	2	1	0	1	50.00	—
22	(South Korea) Kim Kyu-hwan (Note: Does not include one match against Brazil Olympic at the 1964 Summer Olympics.)	May 1964	October 1964	6	3	1	2	50.00	1964 Summer Olympics group stage
—	(South Korea) Park Il-kap (Note: Participated in the 1964 AFC Asian Cup with B team, but KFA recognised his results as international "A" matches.)	May 1964	June 1964	3	1	0	2	33.33	1964 AFC Asian Cup third place
23	(South Korea) Chung Nam-sik	July 1965	August 1965	6	3	2	1	50.00	—
24	(South Korea) Han Chang-wha	July 1966	September 1966	5	3	0	2	60.00	—
25	(South Korea) An Jong-soo	September 1966	December 1966	2	0	0	2	0.00	1966 Asian Games first group stage
26	(South Korea) Jang Kyung-hwan	May 1967	October 1967	15	10	3	2	66.67	—
27	(South Korea) Park Il-kap	October 1967	August 1968	11	8	0	3	72.73	—
28	(South Korea) Kim Yong-sik	September 1969	October 1969	4	1	2	1	25.00	—
29	(South Korea) Kang Jun-young	November 1969	November 1969	5	4	1	0	80.00	—
30	(South Korea) Han Hong-ki	13 February 1970	6 October 1971	32	20	8	4	62.50	1970 Asian Games gold medal
31	(South Korea) Hong Deok-young	1 November 1971	24 November 1971	4	1	3	0	25.00	—
32	(South Korea) Park Byung-suk	7 December 1971	15 June 1972	5	1	2	2	20.00	1972 AFC Asian Cup runner-up
33	(South Korea) Ham Heung-chul	12 June 1972	20 December 1972	19	11	5	3	57.89	—
34	(South Korea) Min Byung-dae	21 December 1972	20 November 1973	13	7	4	2	53.85	—
35	(South Korea) Moon Jung-sik	20 November 1973	25 December 1973	4	3	1	0	75.00	—
36	(South Korea) Choi Yung-keun	31 January 1974	28 October 1974	8	2	1	5	25.00	1974 Asian Games second group stage
37	(South Korea) Ham Heung-chul	29 October 1974	13 May 1976	35	25	5	5	71.43	—
38	(South Korea) Moon Jung-sik	14 May 1976	2 January 1977	14	8	4	2	57.14	—
39	(South Korea) Choi Chung-min	3 January 1977	16 September 1977	21	14	6	1	66.67	—
40	(South Korea) Kim Jung-nam	17 September 1977	18 December 1977	5	2	3	0	40.00	—
41	(South Korea) Ham Heung-chul	2 March 1978	28 March 1979	21	18	2	1	85.71	1978 Asian Games gold medal
42	(South Korea) Jang Kyung-hwan	29 March 1979	3 May 1980	14	11	1	2	78.57	—
43	(South Korea) Kim Jung-nam	3 May 1980	20 June 1982	30	17	8	5	56.67	1980 AFC Asian Cup runner-up
44	(South Korea) Choi Eun-taek	21 June 1982	28 January 1983	3	1	0	2	33.33	1982 Asian Games group stage
45	(South Korea) Cho Yoon-ok	29 January 1983	22 August 1983	9	5	3	1	55.56	—
46	(South Korea) Park Jong-hwan	23 August 1983	2 July 1984	12	6	3	3	50.00	—
47	(South Korea) Moon Jung-sik	3 July 1984	16 March 1985	12	5	3	4	41.67	1984 AFC Asian Cup group stage
48	(South Korea) Kim Jung-nam	17 March 1985	19 November 1986	23	14	3	6	60.87	1986 FIFA World Cup group stage 1986 Asian Games gold medal
49	(South Korea) Park Jong-hwan	20 November 1986	30 June 1988	7	4	3	0	57.14	—
50	(South Korea) Kim Jung-nam (Note: Does not include two matches against the Soviet Union Olympic and Argentina Olympic at the 1988 Summer Olympics.)	6 July 1988	5 November 1988	2	1	1	0	50.00	1988 Summer Olympics group stage
51	(South Korea) Lee Hoe-taik	5 November 1988	30 June 1990	29	17	6	6	58.62	1988 AFC Asian Cup runner-up 1990 FIFA World Cup group stage
52	(South Korea) Lee Cha-man	3 July 1990	8 August 1990	4	3	1	0	75.00	—
53	(South Korea) Park Jong-hwan	9 August 1990	23 October 1990	10	8	0	2	80.00	1990 Asian Games bronze medal
54	(South Korea) Ko Jae-wook	22 May 1991	27 July 1991	6	3	3	0	50.00	—

=== Full-time managers (1992–present) ===
Key
Caretaker manager

No.	Manager	From	To	P	W	D	L	Win %	Competition(s)
55	(South Korea) Kim Ho	8 July 1992	30 June 1994	37	14	15	8	37.84	1994 FIFA World Cup group stage
56	(Russia) Anatoliy Byshovets	24 July 1994	26 February 1995	14	6	4	4	42.86	1994 Asian Games fourth place
57	(South Korea) Park Jong-hwan	26 April 1995	31 July 1995	2	1	0	1	50.00	—
—	(South Korea) Huh Jung-moo	1 August 1995	12 August 1995	1	0	0	1	0.00	—
—	(South Korea) Jung Byung-tak	16 September 1995	30 September 1995	0	0	0	0	—	—
—	(South Korea) Ko Jae-wook	20 October 1995	31 October 1995	1	0	1	0	0.00	—
58	(South Korea) Park Jong-hwan	15 February 1996	7 January 1997	16	8	3	5	50.00	1996 AFC Asian Cup quarter-finals
59	(South Korea) Cha Bum-kun	8 January 1997	21 June 1998	40	21	11	8	52.50	1998 FIFA World Cup group stage
—	(South Korea) Kim Pyung-seok	22 June 1998	25 June 1998	1	0	1	0	0.00	1998 FIFA World Cup group stage
60	(South Korea) Huh Jung-moo	14 October 1998	13 November 2000	33	17	11	5	51.52	1998 Asian Games quarter-finals 2000 CONCACAF Gold Cup group stage 2000 AFC Asian Cup third place
—	(South Korea) Park Hang-seo	10 December 2000	20 December 2000	1	0	1	0	0.00	—
61	(Netherlands) Guus Hiddink	1 January 2001	30 June 2002	37	14	12	11	37.84	2001 FIFA Confederations Cup group stage 2002 CONCACAF Gold Cup fourth place 2002 FIFA World Cup fourth place
—	(South Korea) Kim Ho-kon	3 November 2002	20 November 2002	1	0	0	1	0.00	—
62	(Portugal) Humberto Coelho	3 February 2003	19 April 2004	18	9	3	6	50.00	2003 EAFF Championship champion
—	(South Korea) Park Sung-hwa	20 April 2004	15 June 2004	4	2	1	1	50.00	—
63	(Netherlands) Jo Bonfrère	24 June 2004	23 August 2005	24	10	8	6	41.67	2004 AFC Asian Cup quarter-finals 2005 EAFF Championship fourth place
64	(Netherlands) Dick Advocaat	1 October 2005	30 June 2006	19	9	5	5	47.37	2006 FIFA World Cup group stage
65	(Netherlands) Pim Verbeek	1 July 2006	3 August 2007	17	6	6	5	35.29	2007 AFC Asian Cup third place
66	(South Korea) Huh Jung-moo	1 January 2008	30 June 2010	44	22	14	8	50.00	2008 EAFF Championship champion 2010 EAFF Championship runner-up 2010 FIFA World Cup round of 16
67	(South Korea) Cho Kwang-rae	21 July 2010	8 December 2011	20	12	5	3	60.00	2011 AFC Asian Cup third place
68	(South Korea) Choi Kang-hee	21 December 2011	19 June 2013	14	7	2	5	50.00	—
69	(South Korea) Hong Myung-bo	24 June 2013	10 July 2014	19	5	4	10	26.32	2013 EAFF Championship third place 2014 FIFA World Cup group stage
—	(South Korea) Shin Tae-yong	2 September 2014	8 September 2014	2	1	0	1	50.00	—
70	(Germany) Uli Stielike (Note: Including one uncontested match against Kuwait, which was registered as a 3–0 win as Kuwait was banned from competing.)	24 September 2014	15 June 2017	38	26	5	7	68.42	2015 AFC Asian Cup runner-up 2015 EAFF Championship champion
71	(South Korea) Shin Tae-yong	4 July 2017	31 July 2018	21	7	6	8	33.33	2017 EAFF Championship champion 2018 FIFA World Cup group stage
72	(Portugal) Paulo Bento	22 August 2018	6 December 2022	57	35	13	9	61.40	2019 AFC Asian Cup quarter-finals 2019 EAFF Championship champion 2022 EAFF Championship runner-up 2022 FIFA World Cup round of 16
73	(Germany) Jürgen Klinsmann	27 February 2023	16 February 2024	17	8	6	3	47.06	2023 AFC Asian Cup semi-finals
—	(South Korea) Hwang Sun-hong	27 February 2024	26 March 2024	2	1	1	0	50.00	—
—	(South Korea) Kim Do-hoon	20 May 2024	11 June 2024	2	2	0	0	100.00	—
74	(South Korea) Hong Myung-bo	13 July 2024	29 June 2026	26	15	5	6	57.69	2025 EAFF Championship runner-up 2026 FIFA World Cup group stage
—	(Spain) Robert Moreno	1 September 2026	present	6	3	1	2	50.00	—

== Manager records ==
Most matches managed
78, Huh Jung-moo
Most matches managed (unofficial)
126, Kim Jung-nam
Most matches won
54, Ham Heung-chul
Most matches won in an appointment
35, Paulo Bento
Longest career in an appointment
4 years and 106 days, Paulo Bento, from 22 August 2018 to 6 December 2022
Most appointments
5, Kim Yong-sik, Min Byung-dae and Park Jong-hwan
