= South Korea national football team results (1948–1959) =

- Win Draw Loss

This is a list of football matches played by the South Korea national football team between 1948 and 1959.

== Results by year ==
Year	Pld	W	D	L	Win %
1948	2	1	0	1	50.00
1949	2	1	1	0	50.00
1950	3	2	0	1	66.67
1951	Did not play				
1952	Did not play				
1953	5	3	1	1	60.00
1954	8	2	3	3	25.00
1955	Did not play				
1956	10	8	1	1	80.00
1957	Did not play				
1958	7	4	1	2	57.14
1959	11	7	2	2	63.64
Total	48	28	9	11	58.33

== Matches ==
=== 1948 ===
2 August 1948 Summer Olympics (Round of 16)	Korea	5–3	Mexico	London, Great Britain
	Choi Seong-gon 13'; Bae Jeong-ho 30'; Chung Kook-chin 63', 66'; Chung Nam-sik 87'		Cárdenas 23'; Figueroa 85'; Ruiz 89'

5 August 1948 Summer Olympics (Quarter-finals)	Korea	0–12	Sweden	London, Great Britain
			Liedholm 11', 62'; G. Nordahl 25', 40', 78', 80'; Gren 27'; Carlsson 61', 64', 82'; Rosén 72', 85'

=== 1949 ===
16 January Friendly	Vietnam	3–3	South Korea	Saigon, French Cochinchina
				Stadium: Stade du Jardin de la Ville

25 January Friendly	Macau	0–3	South Korea	Macao
			Chung Nam-sik 30'; Chung Kook-chin 60', 63'

=== 1950 ===
15 April Friendly	Hong Kong	3–6	South Korea	Hong Kong
	Lee Tai-fai 15' (pen.), 24', 35' (pen.)		Kim Yong-sik 3'; Chung Nam-sik 8', 17', 43', 65', 67'

19 April Friendly	Hong Kong	1–0	South Korea	Hong Kong
	Lee Tai-fai 49' (pen.)

22 April Friendly	Macau	1–4	South Korea	Macau
	Jia Hua-ru 40'		Min Byung-dae 35'; Chung Nam-sik 60'; Chung Kook-chin 63'; Lee Han-sang 85'

=== 1953 ===
11 April Friendly	Singapore	2–3	South Korea	Singapore
	Boon Khim 66'; Ismail 86'		Choi Chung-min 15'; Park Il-kap 54'; Kang Jeong-ho 61'

18 April Friendly	Singapore	3–1	South Korea	Singapore
	Ismail 10'; Boon Khim 20', 81'		Choi Yung-keun 26'

19 April Friendly	Singapore	1–3	South Korea	Singapore
	Boon Seong 53'		Choi Chung-min 46'; Chung Nam-sik 60'; Park Il-kap 75'

24 April Friendly	Singapore	0–0	South Korea	Singapore

30 April Friendly	South Korea	3–1	Indonesia	Hong Kong
	Chung Nam-sik 18'; Choi Chung-min 80'; Choi Yung-keun 85'		Dalhar 24'

=== 1954 ===
7 March 1954 FIFA World Cup (Qualification)	Japan	1–5	South Korea	Tokyo, Japan
	Naganuma 16'		Chung Nam-sik 22', 83'; Choi Gwang-seok 34'; Choi Chung-min 68', 87'

14 March 1954 FIFA World Cup (Qualification)	Japan	2–2	South Korea	Tokyo, Japan
	Iwatani 16', 60'		Chung Nam-sik 24'; Choi Chung-min 43'

1 May 1954 Asian Games (Group D)	South Korea	3–3	Hong Kong	Manila, Philippines
	Park Il-kap 26'; Chung Kook-chin 69'; Sung Nak-woon 76'		Chu Wing-wah 2'; Lee Yuk-tak 63' (pen.), 72'

2 May 1954 Asian Games (Group D)	South Korea	8–2	Afghanistan	Manila, Philippines
	Choi Chung-min 7'; Choi Gwang-seok 22'; Sung Nak-woon 23', 45', 55', 80'; Chung Nam-sik 42'; ? 49' (o.g.)

6 May 1954 Asian Games (Semi-finals)	South Korea	2–2 (a.e.t.)	Burma	Manila, Philippines
	Kang Chang-gi 18'; Choi Chung-min 71'

8 May 1954 Asian Games (Final)	South Korea	2–5	Taiwan	Manila, Philippines
	Choi Chung-min 30'; Park Il-kap 71'		Yiu Cheuk-yin 6'; Chu Wing-keung 17' (pen.), 68'; Szeto Man 50'; Ho Ying-fan 80'

17 June 1954 FIFA World Cup (Group 2)	South Korea	0–9	Hungary	Zürich, Switzerland
			Puskás 12', 89'; Lantos 18'; Kocsis 24', 36', 50'; Czibor 59'; Palotás 75', 83'

20 June 1954 FIFA World Cup (Group 2)	South Korea	0–7	Turkey	Geneva, Switzerland
			Mamat 10', 30'; Küçükandonyadis 24'; Sargun 37', 64', 70'; Keskin 76'

=== 1956 ===
25 February 1956 AFC Asian Cup (Qualification)	Philippines	0–2	South Korea	Manila, Philippines
			Sung Nak-woon 57'; Choi Chung-min 61'

21 April 1956 AFC Asian Cup (Qualification)	South Korea	3–0	Philippines	Seoul, South Korea
	Kim Hong-woo 5', 78'; Woo Sang-kwon 64'

3 June 1956 Summer Olympics (Qualification)	Japan	2–0	South Korea	Tokyo, Japan
	Uchino 54'; Iwabuchi 77'

10 June 1956 Summer Olympics (Qualification)	Japan	0–2	South Korea	Tokyo, Japan
			Sung Nak-woon 59'; Choi Gwang-seok 65'

26 August 1956 AFC Asian Cup (Qualification)	South Korea	2–0	Taiwan	Seoul, South Korea
	Choi Chung-min 23'; Kim Dong-keun 78'

2 September 1956 AFC Asian Cup (Qualification)	Taiwan	1–2	South Korea	Taipei, Republic of China
	Chu Wing-keung 20'		Kim Dong-keun 55' (pen.), 89'

6 September 1956 AFC Asian Cup	Hong Kong	2–2	South Korea	Hong Kong
	Tang Yee-kit 10'; Ko Po-keung 39'		Kim Ji-sung 45'; Sung Nak-woon 62'

8 September 1956 AFC Asian Cup	South Korea	2–1	Israel	Hong Kong
	Woo Sang-kwon 52'; Sung Nak-woon 62'		Stelmach 71'

15 September 1956 AFC Asian Cup	South Korea	5–3	South Vietnam	Hong Kong
	Sung Nak-woon 5'; Woo Sang-kwon 46' (pen.), 58'; Choi Chung-min 56', 68'		Trương Văn Thọ 19'; Lê Hữu Đức 51', 62'

31 October Friendly	South Korea	1–0	United States	Seoul, South Korea
	Kim Dong-keun 87'

=== 1958 ===
18 February Friendly	Hong Kong	3–2	South Korea	Hong Kong
	Chu Wing-wah 49'; Mok Chun-wah 76', 87'		Choi Gwang-seok 25'; Choi Chung-min 40'

19 February Friendly	Hong Kong	1–1	South Korea	Hong Kong
	Law Kwok-tai 21'		Woo Sang-kwon 66'

26 May 1958 Asian Games (Group D)	South Korea	2–1	Singapore	Tokyo, Japan
	Kim Dong-keun 35'; Woo Sang-kwon 65'		Arthur 30'

28 May 1958 Asian Games (Group D)	South Korea	5–0	Iran	Tokyo, Japan
	Lee Soo-nam 6'; Kim Yeong-jin 33'; Moon Jung-sik 50'; Choi Chung-min 53'; Woo Sang-kwon 84'

30 May 1958 Asian Games (Quarter-finals)	South Korea	3–1	South Vietnam	Tokyo, Japan
	Choi Gwang-seok 55'; Woo Sang-kwon 75'; Sung Nak-woon 80'		Lại Văn Ngôn 20'

31 May 1958 Asian Games (Semi-finals)	South Korea	3–1	India	Tokyo, Japan
	Choi Chung-min 7'; Lee Soo-nam 75'; Moon Jung-sik 83'		Damodaran 25'

1 June 1958 Asian Games (Final)	South Korea	2–3 (a.e.t.)	Taiwan	Tokyo, Japan
	Lee Soo-nam 15'; Choi Gwang-seok 88'		Yiu Cheuk-yin 65'; Lau Yee 85' (pen.); Law Kwok-tai 110'

=== 1959 ===
30 August 1959 Merdeka Tournament	South Korea	2–3	South Vietnam	Kuala Lumpur, Malaya
	Son Myung-sub 2' (pen.); Cho Yoon-ok 10'		Hà Tâm 38', 88'; Đỗ Thới Vinh 39'

2 September 1959 Merdeka Tournament	South Korea	4–1	Singapore	Kuala Lumpur, Malaya
	Woo Sang-kwon 33'; Yoo Pan-soon 39'; Choi Chung-min 57'; Cha Tae-sung 60'		Quah 37'

5 September 1959 Merdeka Tournament	South Korea	0–0	Japan	Kuala Lumpur, Malaya

6 September 1959 Merdeka Tournament	South Korea	3–1	Japan	Kuala Lumpur, Malaya
	Choi Chung-min 2'; Cho Yoon-ok 8'; Cha Tae-sung 57'		Uchino 12'

7 September Friendly	Malaya	2–4	South Korea	Kuala Lumpur, Malaya
	Arthur 7'; Govindarajoo 60'		Woo Sang-kwon 22'; Cha Tae-sung 28', 62'; Cho Yoon-ok 64'

8 September Friendly	South Korea	1–1	India	Penang, Malaya
	Cho Yoon-ok 30'		Banerjee 6'

10 September Friendly	South Korea	3–2	Hong Kong	Penang, Malaya
	Woo Sang-kwon 3'; Cho Yoon-ok 20'; Moon Jung-sik 50'		Lee Yuk-tak 23'; Lee Tak-wai 55'

12 September Friendly	Singapore	1–5	South Korea	Singapore
	Fewtrell 37'		Moon Jung-sik 15'; Choi Chung-min 47'; Woo Sang-kwon 55'; Cho Yoon-ok 65', 67'

13 September Friendly	Singapore	0–4	South Korea	Singapore
			Moon Jung-sik 13'; Lee Soon-myung 37'; Yoo Pan-soon 32'; Cho Yoon-ok 67'

13 December 1960 Summer Olympics (Qualification)	Japan	0–2	South Korea	Tokyo, Japan
			Choi Chung-min 51'; Moon Jung-sik 57'

20 December 1960 Summer Olympics (Qualification)	Japan	1–0	South Korea	Tokyo, Japan
	Ninomiya 70'

== See also ==
- South Korea national football team results
- South Korea national football team
