= Chu Yung-kwang =

South Korean footballer

Personal information
- Date of birth: 1920
- Place of birth: Pyongyang, Korea, Empire of Japan
- Date of death: 28 September 1982 (aged 62)
- Place of death: Seoul, South Korea
- Position: Midfielder

Senior career*
Years	Team	Apps	(Gls)
- Seoul Football Club

International career
- South Korea
Medal record
Representing South Korea
Men's football
Asian Games
Silver medal – second place	1954 Manila	Team
Korean name
Hangul	주영광
Hanja	朱榮光
RR	Ju Yeonggwang
MR	Chu Yŏnggwang
- * Club domestic league appearances and goals

Chu Yung-kwang (Korean: 주영광; 1 December 1920 – 28 September 1982) was a South Korean football midfielder who played for the South Korea in the 1954 FIFA World Cup. During this tournament he was captain of South Korea national football team. He also played for Seoul Football Club.

== Honours ==
South Korea

- Asian Games Silver medal: 1954
