= Hong Deok-young =

South Korean footballer, manager, and referee

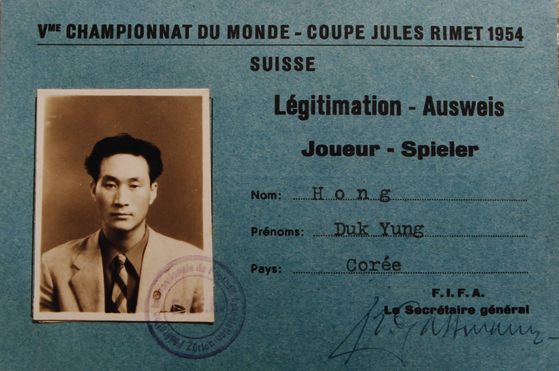
- Hong in 1954

Personal information
- Full name: Hong Deok-young
- Date of birth: 5 May 1926
- Place of birth: Hamhung, Kankyōnan-dō, Korea, Empire of Japan
- Date of death: 13 September 2005 (aged 79)
- Place of death: Seoul, South Korea
- Height: 1.69 m (5 ft 7 in)
- Position: Goalkeeper

Youth career
- Hamhung High School

College career
Years	Team	Apps	(Gls)
1946–1950	Korea University		

Senior career*
Years	Team	Apps	(Gls)
1947	Seoul FC		
?–1955	Joseon Textile		

International career
1948–1954	South Korea	17	(0)

Managerial career
- 1959–1962: Korea University
- 1969–1976: Seoul Bank
- 1971: South Korea
Medal record
Representing South Korea
Men's football
Asian Games
Silver medal – second place	1954 Manila
- * Club domestic league appearances and goals

Hong Deok-young (Korean: 홍덕영; Hanja: 洪德永; 5 May 1926 – 13 September 2005) was a South Korean football player, manager and referee. He was one of the first South Koreans to be capped for their country at international level. He was the main goalkeeper of the South Korea national team for the 1948 Summer Olympics, 1954 FIFA World Cup and 1954 Asian Games. After retiring, he became an international football referee from 1957 to 1967. In later life, Hong went blind due to complications from diabetes, which already had an impact on his eyesight during his playing career, requiring him to wear glasses on the pitch. He died on 13 September 2005.

== International career ==
Seoul FC, temporary national team before South Korea was established, left for Shanghai in April 1947 and played five matches against Shanghai's amateur football teams. Hong participated in these games.

Hong participated at the 1948 Summer Olympics, the first international tournament of South Korean football, and contributed to a 5–3 win over Mexico, its first-ever win. In the quarter-finals, however, South Korea met the eventual champions Sweden and lost 12–0, the margin of their biggest defeat so far. He struggled in Sweden's 48 shots, and was wounded in the chest after the match.

Hong was selected for the national team for the 1954 FIFA World Cup in Switzerland. South Korea qualified for the World Cup by defeating Japan in qualifiers. However, Korean players got airline tickets late, and arrived in Switzerland about ten hours before the start of their first match. They lost 9–0 to Hungary's "Magical Magyars" in their first match. They met Hungary in the worst condition after taking an airplane for 46 hours, and four players of them left the field in exhaustion during the match. The substitute system didn't exist in football at the time, and so South Korea finished the match with only seven players. Manager Kim Yong-sik changed seven players in the second line-up due to his concern about players' stamina, but they lost 7–0 to Turkey. Hong played both matches and became the goalkeeper who conceded the most goals in a single World Cup by conceding 16 goals.

== Career statistics ==
=== International ===
Appearances and goals by national team and year
National team	Year	Apps	Goals
South Korea	1948	2	0
South Korea	1949	2	0
South Korea	1953	5	0
South Korea	1954	8	0
Career total		17	0

Appearances and goals by competition
Competition	Apps	Goals
Friendlies	7	0
Asian Games	4	0
Summer Olympics	2	0
FIFA World Cup qualification	2	0
FIFA World Cup	2	0
Total	17	0

== Honours ==
Joseon Textile

- Korean President's Cup runner-up: 1952, 1953, 1954

South Korea

- Asian Games silver medal: 1954

Individual

- Korean FA Hall of Fame: 2005
