= Park Gyeong-ho =

- Hangul: 박경호
- RR: Bak Gyeongho
- MR: Pak Kyŏngho

Park Gyeong-ho or Park Kyung-ho may refer to:

- Park Kyung-ho (judoka)
- Park Kyung-ho (footballer)
