= Ji-sung =

Korean given name (지성)

- Hangul: 지성
- RR: Jiseong
- MR: Chisŏng

Ji-sung, also spelled Ji-seong or Chi-song, is a Korean given name.

People with this name include:

- Kim Ji-sung (footballer) (1924–1982), South Korean footballer
- Park Ji-sung (born 1981), South Korean male footballer
- Yoon Ji-sung (born 1991), South Korean singer and actor
- Nam Ji-sung (born 1993), South Korean male tennis player
- Kim Ji-sung (actress) (born 1996), South Korean actress
- Han (musician) (born Han Ji-sung, 2000), South Korean musician
- Jisung (born Park Ji-sung, 2002), South Korean singer
- Eom Ji-sung (born 2002), South Korean male footballer

== See also ==
- List of Korean given names
