= Park Jae-seung =

South Korean footballer (1923–2015)

Personal information
- Date of birth: 1 April 1923
- Place of birth: Korea under Japanese rule
- Date of death: 12 March 2015 (aged 91)
- Position: Defender

Senior career*
| Years | Team | Apps | (Gls) |
- Seoul Football Club

International career
- South Korea
Medal record
Representing South Korea
Men's football
AFC Asian Cup
| Gold medal – first place | 1956 Hong Kong | Team |
- * Club domestic league appearances and goals

- Park Jae-seung
- Hangul: 박재승
- Hanja: 朴在昇
- RR: Bak Jaeseung
- MR: Pak Chaesŭng

Park Jae-seung (Korean: 박재승; Hanja: 朴在昇, 1 April 1923 – 12 March 2015) was a South Korean football defender who played for South Korea in the 1954 FIFA World Cup. He also played for Seoul Football Club. Park was noted as the last surviving player from the 1954 Korean team in May 2014, at which point he was hospitalised in poor health. Park died on 12 March 2015, at the age of 91.
