= Kim Ji-sung =

Kim Ji-sung may refer to:

- Kim Ji-sung (footballer) (1924–1982), South Korean football midfielder
- Kim Ji-sung (actress) (born 1996), South Korean actress
