= Lee Soo-nam =

South Korean footballer and referee

Lee Soo-Nam 이수남
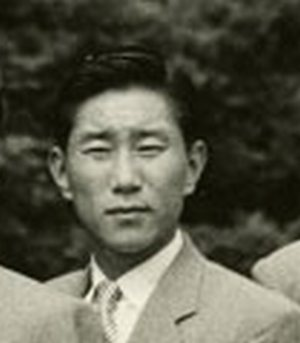
- Lee Soo Nam (South Korea) played at the 1954 World Cup.

Personal information
- Date of birth: February 2, 1927
- Place of birth: Keijō, Keiki-dō, Korea, Empire of Japan
- Date of death: January 8, 1984 (aged 56)
- Position: Forward

Senior career*
Years	Team	Apps	(Gls)
- Seoul Football Club

International career
- South Korea
Medal record
Representing South Korea
Men's football
AFC Asian Cup
Gold medal – first place	1956 Hong Kong	Team
- * Club domestic league appearances and goals

Lee Soo-Nam (Korean: 이수남; Hanja: 李秀男, 2 February 1927 – 8 January 1984) was a South Korean football forward who played for the South Korea in the 1954 FIFA World Cup. He also played for Seoul Football Club.

He was football referee from 1962.
