= Park Kyung-ho (footballer) =

South Korean footballer and manager (1930–2021)

Park Kyung-ho 박경호
Personal information
- Date of birth: 20 May 1930
- Place of birth: Haeju, Kōkai-dō, Korea, Empire of Japan
- Date of death: 29 March 2021 (aged 90)
- Place of death: Seoul
- Position: Forward

Senior career*
Years	Team	Apps	(Gls)
- Counter Intelligence Corps FC

International career
1954–1958	South Korea		
Medal record
Representing South Korea
Men's football
AFC Asian Cup
Gold medal – first place	1956 Hong Kong	Team
Asian Games
Silver medal – second place	1958 Tokyo	Team
- * Club domestic league appearances and goals

Park Kyung-ho (Korean: 박경호, 20 May 1930 – 29 March 2021) was a Korean football player and manager. He played for the South Korea national team during the 1950s and was part of the squad that won the 1956 AFC Asian Cup. He was also part of the South Korea squad that achieved the silver medal at the 1958 Asian Games.

He played at club level for the Counter Intelligence Corps (CIC FC).

== Honors ==
South Korea

- AFC Asian Cup: 1956
