= Woo Sang-kwon =

South Korean footballer and manager

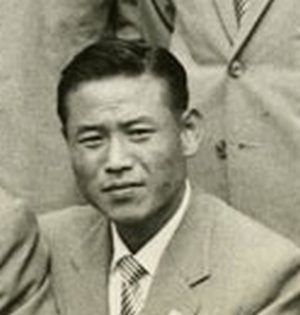
- Woo in 1956

Personal information
- Full name: Woo Sang-kwon
- Date of birth: 2 February 1926
- Place of birth: Korea, Empire of Japan
- Date of death: 13 December 1975 (aged 49)
- Place of death: Seoul, South Korea
- Position: Second striker

Senior career*
Years	Team	Apps	(Gls)
?–1964	ROK Army OPMG		

International career
1954–1964	South Korea	49	(17)
Medal record
Representing South Korea
Men's football
AFC Asian Cup
Gold medal – first place	1956 Hong Kong	Team
Gold medal – first place	1960 South Korea	Team
Asian Games
Silver medal – second place	1958 Tokyo	Team
- * Club domestic league appearances and goals

Woo Sang-kwon (Korean: 우상권; Hanja: 禹相權; 2 February 1926 – 13 December 1975) was a South Korean football player and coach. He played for the South Korean national team in the 1954 FIFA World Cup and the 1964 Summer Olympics.

== Honours ==
ROK Army OPMG

- Korean National Championship: 1954
- Korean President's Cup runner-up: 1957

South Korea

- AFC Asian Cup: 1956, 1960
- Asian Games silver medal: 1958

Individual

- KASA Best Korean Footballer: 1959
