= Li Dahui =

Chinese footballer

International career
Years	Team	Apps	(Gls)
- China
Medal record
Men's football
Representing Taiwan
Asian Games
Gold medal – first place	1954 Manila

Li Dahui was a Chinese footballer. He competed in the men's tournament at the 1948 Summer Olympics.

== Honours ==
Republic of China

- Asian Games: Gold medal, 1954
