= Kim Kyu-hwan =

South Korean footballer (1921–2007)

Kim Kyu-Hwan 김규환
Personal information
- Date of birth: 16 July 1921
- Place of birth: Korea, Empire of Japan
- Date of death: October 5, 2007 (aged 86)
- Position: Midfielder

Youth career
- 1931–1933: Kwangseong High School

Senior career*
Years	Team	Apps	(Gls)
1939–1940	Pyongyang FC		

International career
- South Korea

Managerial career
- 1959: South Korea (assistant coach)
- * Club domestic league appearances and goals

Kim Kyu-hwan (Korean: 김규환; Hanja: 金奎歡, 16 July 1921 – 5 October 2007) was a South Korean football player who played for the South Korea in the 1948 Olympic. After retirement, He was appointed assistant manager in South Korea national football team in 1962
