= Park Chung-hwi =

South Korean football manager (1909–1985)

Personal information
- Date of birth: 1909
- Place of birth: Korea, Empire of Japan
- Date of death: 1985 (aged 75–76)
- Place of death: Seoul, South Korea

Youth career
- Years: Team
- Keijō Imperial University

Managerial career
- 1948–1950: South Korea
- 1955: South Korea

- Park Chung-hwi
- Hangul: 박정휘
- Hanja: 朴廷徽
- RR: Bak Jeonghwi
- MR: Pak Chŏnghwi

Park Chung-hwi (Korean: 박정휘; 1909–1985) was a South Korean football player and manager.

In 1948, he became the first manager of the South Korea national team.
