= Chung Kook-chin =

South Korean footballer (1917–1976)

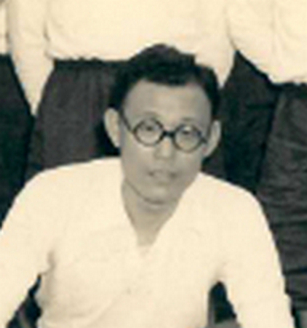

Personal information
- Full name: Chung Kook-chin
- Date of birth: January 2, 1917
- Place of birth: Korea, Empire of Japan
- Date of death: February 10, 1976 (aged 59)
- Position: Forward

International career
Years	Team	Apps	(Gls)
- South Korea

- Chung Kook-chin
- Hangul: 정국진
- Hanja: 鄭國振
- RR: Jeong Gukjin
- MR: Chŏng Kukchin

Chung Kook-chin
Medal record

Representing South Korea

Men's football

Asian Games
Silver medal – second place	1954 Manila	Team

Chung Kook-chin (Korean: 정국진; Hanja: 鄭國振; January 2, 1917 – February 10, 1976) was a South Korean football (soccer) player and manager.

He is a descendant of the Korean athletic legends The Three Boar Brothers. He was a member of the South Korea national football team that participated in the 1948 London Olympics and the 1954 Switzerland World Cup. He was famous in his time for wearing eyeglasses during matches. He played forward and, being able to kick with both feet, was usually positioned on the left wing.

Chung Kook-chin managed South Korea twice as head coach. The first managing period was in 1959 during 1960 Olympics football qualification, and his second tenure included the 1964 Olympics football tournament.

He became Vice President of the Korea Football Association shortly before his death.
