= Min Byung-dae =

South Korean footballer

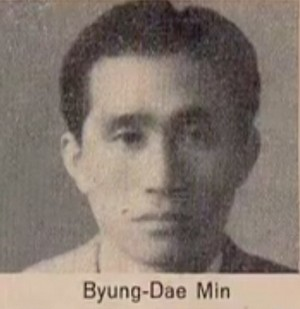
- Min Byung Dae (South Korea) played vs Hungary at the 1954 World Cup

Personal information
- Date of birth: 20 February 1918
- Place of birth: Korea, Empire of Japan
- Date of death: 4 January 1983 (aged 64)
- Place of death: Seoul, South Korea
- Position: Defender

Youth career
- Pai Chai High School
- Boseong College

Senior career*
| Years | Team | Apps | (Gls) |
- Seoul Army Club

International career
| 1944 | Japan | 1 | (0) |
| 1944–1954 | South Korea | 12 | (0) |
- * Club domestic league appearances and goals

- Min Byung-dae
- Hangul: 민병대
- Hanja: 閔丙大
- RR: Min Byeongdae
- MR: Min Pyŏngdae

Min Byung-dae (Korean: 민병대; Hanja: 閔丙大; 20 February 1918 – 4 January 1983) was a South Korean football defender who played for the South Korea in the 1948 Summer Olympics and the 1954 FIFA World Cup.
