= Cho Yoon-ok =

South Korean footballer and coach (1940–2002)

Personal information
- Full name: Cho Yoon-ok
- Date of birth: 25 February 1940 (Note: K League website stated that the year of Cho's birth is 1937.)
- Place of birth: Keijō, Keiki-dō, Korea, Empire of Japan
- Date of death: 22 June 2002 (aged 62)
- Place of death: Seoul, South Korea
- Position: Second striker

College career
Years	Team	Apps	(Gls)
1965	Kyung Hee University		

Senior career*
Years	Team	Apps	(Gls)
1960–1962	ROK Army CIC (draft)		
1963–1964	Korea Tungsten		
1966–1968	Korea Tungsten		

International career
1959–1960	South Korea U20		
1959–1967	South Korea	55	(25)

Managerial career
- 1975–1981: POSCO FC
- 1983: South Korea
- 1984: Daewoo Royals
Medal record
Men's football
Representing South Korea
AFC Asian Cup
Winner	1960 South Korea
Asian Games
Silver medal – second place	1962 Jakarta
AFC Youth Championship
Winner	1959 Malaya
Winner	1960 Malaya
- * Club domestic league appearances and goals

- Cho Yoon-ok
- Hangul: 조윤옥
- Hanja: 趙潤玉
- RR: Jo Yunok
- MR: Cho Yunok

Cho Yoon-ok (25 February 1940 – 22 June 2002) was a South Korean football player and manager. Considered one of Asia's greatest inside forwards in the 1960s, Cho led South Korea to an AFC Asian Cup title. He also participated at the 1964 Summer Olympics.

== Honours ==
=== Player ===
ROK Army CIC

- Korean President's Cup: 1961

Korea Tungsten

- Korean National Semipro League (Spring): 1968
- Korean National Semipro League (Autumn): 1966
- Korean National Championship runner-up: 1968
- Korean President's Cup: 1966

South Korea U20

- AFC Youth Championship: 1959, 1960

South Korea

- AFC Asian Cup: 1960
- Asian Games silver medal: 1962

Individual

- AFC Asian Cup top goalscorer: 1960
- AFC Asian All-Star: 1965, 1966, 1967
- Korean FA Most Valuable Player: 1965

=== Manager ===
POSCO FC

- Korean National Semipro League (Autumn): 1981
- Korean National Championship runner-up: 1977

Individual

- Korean National Semipro League (Autumn) Best Manager: 1981
