= Kim Ji-sung (footballer) =

South Korean footballer

Personal information
- Date of birth: 7 November 1924
- Place of birth: Korea, Empire of Japan
- Date of death: 12 November 1982 (aged 58)
- Place of death: Seoul, South Korea
- Position: Midfielder

College career
Years	Team	Apps	(Gls)
?–1948	Yonhi University		

Senior career*
Years	Team	Apps	(Gls)
1949–?	Gyeongseong Electricity		
?–1960	ROK Army CIC		

International career
1949–1958	South Korea	17	(1)

Managerial career
- 1961–1975: Yonsei University
- 1962: South Korea U20
Medal record
Men's football
Representing South Korea (as player)
AFC Asian Cup
Gold medal – first place	1956 Hong Kong	Team
Asian Games
Silver medal – second place	1954 Manila	Team
Silver medal – second place	1958 Tokyo	Team
Representing South Korea (as manager)
AFC Youth Championship
Silver medal – second place	1962 Thailand	Team
- * Club domestic league appearances and goals

Kim Ji-sung (Korean: 김지성; Hanja: 金智星; 7 November 1924 – 12 November 1982) was a South Korean football midfielder who played for the South Korean national team in the 1954 FIFA World Cup.

== Honours ==
=== Player ===
ROK Army CIC

- Korean National Championship: 1957, 1959
- Korean President's Cup: 1956, 1957, 1959

South Korea

- AFC Asian Cup: 1956
- Asian Games silver medal: 1954, 1958

Individual

- KASA Best Korean Footballer: 1958

=== Manager ===
Yonsei University

- Korean National Championship runner-up: 1974
- Korean President's Cup runner-up: 1961, 1969

South Korea U20

- AFC Youth Championship runner-up: 1962
