= 1960 AFC Asian Cup =

Asian Cup Korea 1960 1960년 AFC 아시안컵

Tournament details
- Host country: South Korea
- Dates: 14–23 October
- Teams: 4
- Venue: 1 (in 1 host city)

Final positions
- Champions: South Korea (2nd title)
- Runners-up: Israel
- Third place: Republic of China
- Fourth place: South Vietnam

Tournament statistics
- Matches played: 6
- Goals scored: 19 (3.17 per match)
- Top scorer(s): (South Korea) Cho Yoon-ok (4 goals)

The 1960 AFC Asian Cup was the 2nd edition of the men's AFC Asian Cup, a quadrennial international football tournament organised by the Asian Football Confederation (AFC). The finals were hosted by South Korea from 14 October to 23 October 1960. The final tournament was organised on a round robin basis, and host country South Korea won with a perfect record of three wins.

As in the 1st edition of the competition, the tournament kept the unusual arrangement of 80 minutes games.

== Venues ==
| Seoul is located in South Korea | Seoul |
|---|---|
| Seoul is located in South Korea | Hyochang Stadium |
| Seoul is located in South Korea | Capacity: 15,194 |

== Qualification ==
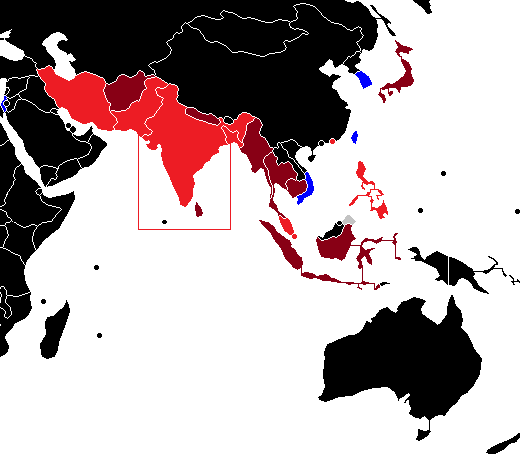
Qualified Did not qualify Withdrew before playing any matches Did not enter Not an AFC member

| Team | Qualified as | Qualified on | Previous appearance |
|---|---|---|---|
| South Korea | Hosts | N/A | 1 (1956) |
| South Vietnam | Central Zone winners | 13 May 1959 | 1 (1956) |
| Republic of China | Eastern zone winners | 3 April 1959 | 0 (debut) |
| Israel | Western Zone winners | 17 December 1959 | 1 (1956) |

== Results ==
All times are Korea Standard Time (UTC+9)

| Pos | Team | Pld | W | D | L | GF | GA | GD | Pts | Qualification |
|---|---|---|---|---|---|---|---|---|---|---|
| 1 | South Korea (H) | 3 | 3 | 0 | 0 | 9 | 1 | +8 | 6 | Champions |
| 2 | Israel | 3 | 2 | 0 | 1 | 6 | 4 | +2 | 4 | Runners-up |
| 3 | Republic of China | 3 | 1 | 0 | 2 | 2 | 2 | 0 | 2 | Third place |
| 4 | South Vietnam | 3 | 0 | 0 | 3 | 2 | 12 | −10 | 0 | Fourth place |

Source: RSSSF
(H) Hosts
14 October 1960
15:15

| South Korea | 5–1 | South Vietnam |
|---|---|---|
| Cho Yoon-ok 15', 66'; Woo Sang-kwon 27'; Choi Chung-min 47'; Moon Jung-sik 56' | | Nguyễn Văn Tư 65' |

Hyochang Stadium, Seoul
Attendance: 30,000
Referee: Haji Ibrahim bin Annuar (Malaya)

16 October 1960
15:00

| Republic of China | 2–0 | South Vietnam |
|---|---|---|
| Luk Man Wai 51'; Yiu Cheuk Yin 70' |

Hyochang Stadium, Seoul
Attendance: 30,000
Referee: Sumio Hayakawa (Japan)

17 October 1960
15:00

| South Korea | 3–0 | Israel |
|---|---|---|
| Cho Yoon-ok 17', 60'; Woo Sang-kwon 30' |

Hyochang Stadium, Seoul
Attendance: 30,000
Referee: Yozo Yokoyama (Japan)

Over 100,000 people surrounded the stadium in the build up to this match. The crowd stormed through the gates despite mounted police. It is estimated that more than 60,000 people crammed inside the stadium. Around 30 people were injured in the overcrowding, and one young boy died. During the match the referee had to suspend play several times because the crowd spilled over onto the playing field.

19 October 1960
15:00

| South Vietnam | 1–5 | Israel |
|---|---|---|
| Trần Văn Nhung 65' (pen.) | | R. Levi 13'; Stelmach 18'; S. Levi 25'; Menchel 32'; Aharonskind 70' |

Hyochang Stadium, Seoul
Attendance: 15,000
Referee: Luis Javellana (Philippines)

21 October 1960
15:00

| South Korea | 1–0 | Republic of China |
|---|---|---|
| Moon Jung-sik 54' |

Hyochang Stadium, Seoul
Attendance: 23,000
Referee: Haji Ibrahim bin Annuar (Malaya)

23 October 1960
15:00

| Israel | 1–0 | Republic of China |
|---|---|---|
| S. Levi 72' |

Hyochang Stadium, Seoul
Attendance: 25,000
Referee: Yozo Yokoyama (Japan)

== Winners ==
1960 AFC Asian Cup winners

South Korea
Second title

== Goalscorers ==
With four goals, Cho Yoon-Ok is the top scorer in the tournament. In total, 19 goals were scored by 13 different players, with none of them credited as own goal.

4 goals

- (South Korea) Cho Yoon-ok

2 goals

- (Israel) Shlomo Levi
- (South Korea) Moon Jung-sik
- (South Korea) Woo Sang-kwon

1 goal

- (Israel) Amnon Aharonskind
- (Israel) Rafi Levi
- (Israel) Avraham Menchel
- (Israel) Nahum Stelmach
- (Taiwan) Luk Man Wai
- (Taiwan) Yiu Cheuk Yin
- (South Korea) Choi Chung-min
- (South Vietnam) Nguyễn Văn Tư
- (South Vietnam) Trần Văn Nhung
