= Moon Jung-sik =

South Korean footballer and manager

Personal information
- Full name: Moon Jung-sik
- Date of birth: 23 June 1930
- Place of birth: Korea, Empire of Japan
- Date of death: 25 December 2006 (aged 76)
- Place of death: Seoul, South Korea
- Position: Forward

Youth career
- Paichai High School

Senior career*
Years	Team	Apps	(Gls)
?–1957	ROK Army HID		
1958–1961	ROK Army CIC		
1962–1965	Cheil Industries		

International career
1958–1962	South Korea	34	(8)

Managerial career
- 1973–1981: Korea Automobile Insurance
- 1973: South Korea
- 1976: South Korea
- 1984–1986: Hyundai Horang-i
- 1984–1985: South Korea
- 1991–1992: South Korea (women)
- 1994–1996: Ōita Trinity
Medal record
Representing South Korea
Men's football
AFC Asian Cup
Winner	1960 South Korea
Asian Games
Silver medal – second place	1958 Tokyo
Silver medal – second place	1962 Jakarta
- * Club domestic league appearances and goals

- Moon Jung-sik
- Hangul: 문정식
- Hanja: 文正植
- RR: Mun Jeongsik
- MR: Mun Chŏngsik

Moon Jung-sik (23 June 1930 – 25 December 2006) was a South Korean football player and manager. He was a member of the South Korea national football team when they won the 1960 AFC Asian Cup.

== Honours ==
=== Player ===
ROK Army HID

- Korean President's Cup: 1954

ROK Army CIC

- Korean National Championship: 1959
- Korean President's Cup: 1959, 1961

Cheil Industries

- Korean National Semipro League (Spring): 1964
- Korean President's Cup: 1963

South Korea

- AFC Asian Cup: 1960
- Asian Games silver medal: 1958, 1962

Individual

- KASA Best Korean Footballer: 1960

=== Manager ===
Korea Automobile Insurance

- Korean National Semipro League (Autumn): 1978, 1980
- Korean President's Cup: 1976

Ōita Trinity

- Kyushu Soccer League: 1995

Individual

- Korean National Semipro League (Autumn) Best Manager: 1978
- Korean President's Cup Best Manager: 1976
