= Choi Chung-min =

South Korean footballer (1930–1983)

Personal information
- Full name: Choi Chung-min
- Date of birth: 30 August 1930
- Place of birth: Taedong, Heian'nan Province, Korea, Empire of Japan
- Date of death: 8 December 1983 (aged 53)
- Place of death: Seoul, South Korea
- Height: 1.78 m (5 ft 10 in)
- Position: Striker

Senior career*
| Years | Team | Apps | (Gls) |
| ?–1963 | ROK Army CIC | | |

International career
| 1953–1961 | South Korea | 47 | (22) |

Managerial career
- 1967–1968: Yangzee
- 1977: South Korea
Medal record
Representing South Korea
Men's football
AFC Asian Cup
| Gold medal – first place | 1956 Hong Kong | Team |
| Gold medal – first place | 1960 South Korea | Team |
Asian Games
| Silver medal – second place | 1954 Manila | Team |
| Silver medal – second place | 1958 Tokyo | Team |
- * Club domestic league appearances and goals

- Choi Chung-min
- Hangul: 최정민
- Hanja: 崔貞敏
- RR: Choe Jeongmin
- MR: Ch'oe Chŏngmin

Choi Chung-min (Korean: 최정민; Hanja: 崔貞敏; 30 August 1930 – 8 December 1983) was a former South Korean football player and manager. Nicknamed the "Golden Legs", Choi was one of Asia's greatest strikers in the 1950s.

== Playing career ==
Choi was born in Taedong, Heian'nan Province, Korea, Empire of Japan, in what is now North Korea. He grew up in Pyongyang, but moved south during the Korean War. Afterwards, he enlisted in the Korea Army Counter Intelligence Corps. (CIC) He played for CIC's football club and the South Korea national football team since 1952.

South Korea went to Japan to play qualifiers for the 1954 FIFA World Cup against Japan national team. South Korean team felt a heavy burden of the two matches against Japan due to pressure from the South Korean public caused by the Japanese occupation until 1945. He scored three goals during two matches, and South Korea advanced to the World Cup by defeating Japan 7–3 on aggregate. In the 1954 FIFA World Cup, however, he failed to prevent South Korea's defeats against Hungary and Turkey.

== Honours ==
ROK Army CIC

- Korean National Championship: 1957, 1959
- Korean President's Cup: 1952, 1953, 1956, 1957, 1959, 1961

South Korea

- AFC Asian Cup: 1956, 1960
- Asian Games silver medal: 1954, 1958
