= 1956 AFC Asian Cup squads =

Squads for the 1956 AFC Asian Cup played in Hong Kong.

== Hong Kong ==
Head coach: (Scotland) Tom Sneddon

No.	Pos.	Player	Date of birth (age)	Caps	Goals	Club
1	GK	Wai Fat Kim (衛佛儉)				(Hong Kong) Kowloon Motor Bus FC
13	GK	Cheung Kwun Hing (張觀興)				(Hong Kong) Kitchee
2	DF	Lee Ping Chiu (李炳照)				(Hong Kong) Kitchee
3	DF	Szeto Yiu (司徒堯)				(Hong Kong) Kitchee
4	DF	Lau Chi Ping (劉志炳)				(Hong Kong) South China
19	MF	Luk Tat Hay (陸達熙)				(Hong Kong) South China
16	MF	Ko Po Keung (高保強)	1930			(Hong Kong) Eastern
18	MF	Chan Chi Kong (陳志剛)				(Hong Kong) South China
	MF	Arthur George dos Santos				(Hong Kong) Prisons
	MF	R.G. Honniball (韓尼波)				(Hong Kong) Sing Tao
8	FW	Chu Wing Wah (朱榮華)				(Hong Kong) South China
14	FW	Lau Chi Lam (劉志霖)				(Hong Kong) Kowloon Motor Bus FC
11	FW	Ho Cheng Yau (何祥友)	1933			(Hong Kong) South China
20	FW	Lam Kam Tong (林錦棠)				(Hong Kong) Kowloon Motor Bus FC
7	FW	Tang Yee Kit (鄧宜杰)				(Hong Kong) Kitchee
10	FW	Au Chi Yin (區志賢)				(Hong Kong) Police FC
9	FW	Lau Kai Chiu (劉繼照)				(Hong Kong) Kitchee
21	FW	Lo Kang Chuen (羅鏡泉)				(Hong Kong) Sing Tao

== South Vietnam ==
Head coach: Lý Đức

No.	Pos.	Player	Date of birth (age)	Caps	Goals	Club
1	GK	Phạm Văn Rạng	8 January 1934 (aged 22)			(Vietnam Football Federation) État-Major Général
12	GK	Nguyễn Văn Quí				(Vietnam Football Federation) Police-Sports
2	DF	Dương Văn Quới				(Vietnam Football Federation) Association Jeunesse Sportive
3	DF	Nguyễn Vi Nhơn				(Vietnam Football Federation) Police-Sports
15	DF	Nguyễn Văn Cụt				(Vietnam Football Federation) Police-Sports
19	DF	Nguyễn Văn Bộ				(Vietnam Football Federation) Police-Sports
5	MF	Trần Văn Ứng				(Vietnam Football Federation) Association Jeunesse Sportive
8	MF	Lê Văn Hồ	10 February 1930 (age 26)			(Vietnam Football Federation) Association Jeunesse Sportive
	MF	Phạm Văn Hiếu	1921 (age 34 - 35)			(Vietnam Football Federation) Association Jeunesse Sportive
10	MF	Nguyễn Như Long				(Vietnam Football Federation) Compagnie Auto
18	MF	Trương Hữu Thọ				(Vietnam Football Federation) Association Jeunesse Sportive
4	FW	Lê Hữu Đức (c)				(Vietnam Football Federation) Police-Sports
6	FW	Nguyễn Văn Tư	1926 (age 29 - 30)			(Vietnam Football Federation) Police-Sports
7	FW	Tạ Vinh Trạch				(Vietnam Football Federation) État-Major Général
9	FW	Lưu Tấn Ngọc	22 September 1932 (age 23)			(Vietnam Football Federation) Police-Sports
11	FW	Trương Văn Được				(Vietnam Football Federation) Police-Sports
13	FW	Trần Văn Nhung	1933 (aged 22 - 23)			(Vietnam Football Federation) Association Jeunesse Sportive
14	FW	Lê Văn Đạt				(Vietnam Football Federation) État-Major Général
16	FW	Đỗ Quang Thách	15 January 1928 (aged 28)			(Vietnam Football Federation) Association Jeunesse Sportive
17	FW	Võ Tư Trung				(Vietnam Football Federation) Association Jeunesse Sportive
23	FW	Đinh Văn Phải				(Vietnam Football Federation) État-Major Général

== South Korea ==
Head coach: Kim Sung-gan

No.	Pos.	Player	Date of birth (age)	Caps	Goals	Club
1	GK	Ham Heung-chul	17 November 1930 (aged 25)			(Korea Football Association) ROK Army OPMG
17	GK	Park Sang-hoon	1931			(Korea Football Association) ROK Marine Corps
19	DF	Cha Tae-sung	8 October 1934 (aged 21)			(Korea Football Association) Yonsei University
3	DF	Park Jae-seung (c)	1 April 1923 (aged 33)			(Korea Football Association) ROK Army CIC
8	DF	Seok Jin-doo				(Korea Football Association) ROK Army Quartermaster Corps
8	DF	Kim Ji-Sup				(Korea Football Association) ROK Army HID
25	MF	Son Myung-sub	6 May 1929 (aged 27)			(Korea Football Association) ROK Army CIC
4	FW	Kim Dong-geun	14 April 1927 (aged 29)			(Korea Football Association) ROK Marine Corps
14	MF	Kim Hong-bok	4 March 1935 (aged 21)			(Korea Football Association) Kookmin University
18	MF	Kim Jin-woo				(Korea Football Association) ROK Army Quartermaster Corps
11	MF	Kim Ji-sung	7 November 1924 (aged 31)			(Korea Football Association) ROK Army CIC
24	FW	Lee Soo-nam	2 February 1927 (aged 29)			(Korea Football Association) ROK Army CIC
15	FW	Sung Nak-woon	17 November 1930 (aged 25)			(Korea Football Association) ROK Army Quartermaster Corps
21	FW	Choi Kwang-seok	17 November 1930 (aged 25)			(Korea Football Association) Korea University
10	FW	Choi Chung-min	17 November 1930 (aged 25)			(Korea Football Association) ROK Army CIC
9	FW	Park Kyung-ho	20 May 1930 (aged 26)			(Korea Football Association) ROK Army CIC
20	MF	Kim Young-jin				(Korea Football Association) ROK Army Quartermaster Corps
12	FW	Woo Sang-kwon	2 February 1928 (aged 28)			(Korea Football Association) ROK Army OPMG

== Israel ==
Head coach: (England) Jackie Gibbons

No.	Pos.	Player	Date of birth (age)	Caps	Goals	Club
1	GK	Ya'akov Hodorov	16 June 1927 (aged 29)	12	0	(Israel Football Association) Hapoel Tel Aviv
19	GK	Ya'akov Vissoker	5 September 1930 (aged 25)	0	0	(Israel Football Association) Hapoel Petah Tikva
3	DF	David Kremer	6 April 1929 (aged 27)	2	0	(Israel Football Association) Hapoel Petah Tikva
6	DF	Shaul Matania	8 March 1937 (aged 19)	2	0	(Israel Football Association) Maccabi Tel Aviv
8	DF	Zigi Silberstein		0	0	(Israel Football Association) Maccabi Petah Tikva
13	MF	Jerry Haldi	14 August 1935 (aged 21)	2	0	(Israel Football Association) Hapoel Petah Tikva
17	MF	Binyamin Rabinovich	1936 (aged 20)	2	0	(Israel Football Association) Maccabi Tel Aviv
11	MF	Itzhak Schneor	11 December 1925 (aged 30)	11	0	(Israel Football Association) Maccabi Tel Aviv
23	MF	Asher Blut	6 January 1932 (aged 24)	5	0	(Israel Football Association) Hapoel Tel Aviv
9	FW	Yehoshua Glazer	29 December 1927 (aged 28)	11	8	(Israel Football Association) Maccabi Tel Aviv
7	FW	Yosef Mirmovich	24 July 1924 (aged 32)	11	0	(Israel Football Association) Maccabi Tel Aviv
18	FW	Nahum Stelmach	19 July 1936 (aged 20)	2	1	(Israel Football Association) Hapoel Petah Tikva
14	FW	Boaz Kofman	29 March 1935 (aged 21)	1	0	(Israel Football Association) Hapoel Petah Tikva
5	FW	Rehavia Rosenbaum	29 April 1934 (aged 22)	5	0	(Israel Football Association) Hapoel Tel Aviv
16	FW	Shmuel Israeli	15 October 1928 (aged 27)	2	0	(Israel Football Association) Maccabi Tel Aviv
20	FW	Eliezer Spiegel	20 June 1922 (aged 34)	2	0	(Israel Football Association) Maccabi Petah Tikva
