= Park Il-kap =

South Korean footballer

Personal information
- Date of birth: 1 November 1923
- Place of birth: Korea, Empire of Japan
- Date of death: 11 September 1987 (aged 61)
- Place of death: São Paulo, Brazil
- Position: Forward

Senior career*
Years	Team	Apps	(Gls)
- Seoul Football Club

International career
- South Korea

Managerial career
- 1964: South Korea (Coach)
- 1967: Yangzee FC
- * Club domestic league appearances and goals

- Park Il-kap
- Hangul: 박일갑
- Hanja: 朴日甲
- RR: Bak Ilgap
- MR: Pak Ilgap

Park Il-kap (Korean: 박일갑; Hanja: 朴日甲; 1 November 1923 – 11 September 1987) was a South Korean football forward who played as a forward for the South Korea in the 1954 FIFA World Cup. He also played for Seoul Football Club.
