= Football at the 1954 Asian Games =

- Venue: Rizal Memorial Stadium
- Date: 1–8 May 1954
- Nations: 12

Medalists
gold medal	Republic of China
silver medal	South Korea
bronze medal	Burma

Football was contested as part of the programme for the 1954 Asian Games which was hosted in Manila, Philippines from 1 to 9 May 1954. It was the second edition of the men's football tournament at the multi-sport event organised by the Asian Games Federation.

The football tournament began with the first matches of the group stage on 1 May 1954 and ended with the gold medal match on 8 May 1954. Taiwan and South Korea contested the final. Zhu Yongqiang scored twice as Taiwan defeated South Korea 5–2 to win the gold medal. In the bronze medal match, Burma defeated Indonesia 5–4.

During the competition, football delegates met and founded the Asian Football Confederation (AFC) on 8 May 1954.

== Background ==
Football had been part of the Asian Games programme following the debut of the men's competition at the inaugural 1951 Asian Games in India. India were the defending champions after defeating Iran 1–0 as hosts in the gold medal match.

Matches were originally scheduled to be played at both the football stadium and the baseball stadium at the Rizal Memorial Sports Complex but, following protest by the participating teams, the baseball stadium was not used for the football tournament.

== Format ==
Matches lasted only 80 minutes and were played as two halves of 40 minutes.

In total, 12 teams took part in the competition. They were drawn into four single round robin groups of four teams. The group winners would contest the semi-finals which would decide the teams contesting the gold and bronze medal matches.

=== Participants ===
- Afghanistan
- Burma
- Hong Kong
- India
- Indonesia
- Japan
- Pakistan
- Philippines
- Singapore
- South Korea
- Taiwan
- Vietnam

== Venue ==
All matches were played at the Rizal Memorial Stadium in Manila.

(Philippines) Manila
Rizal Memorial Stadium
Capacity: 12,873
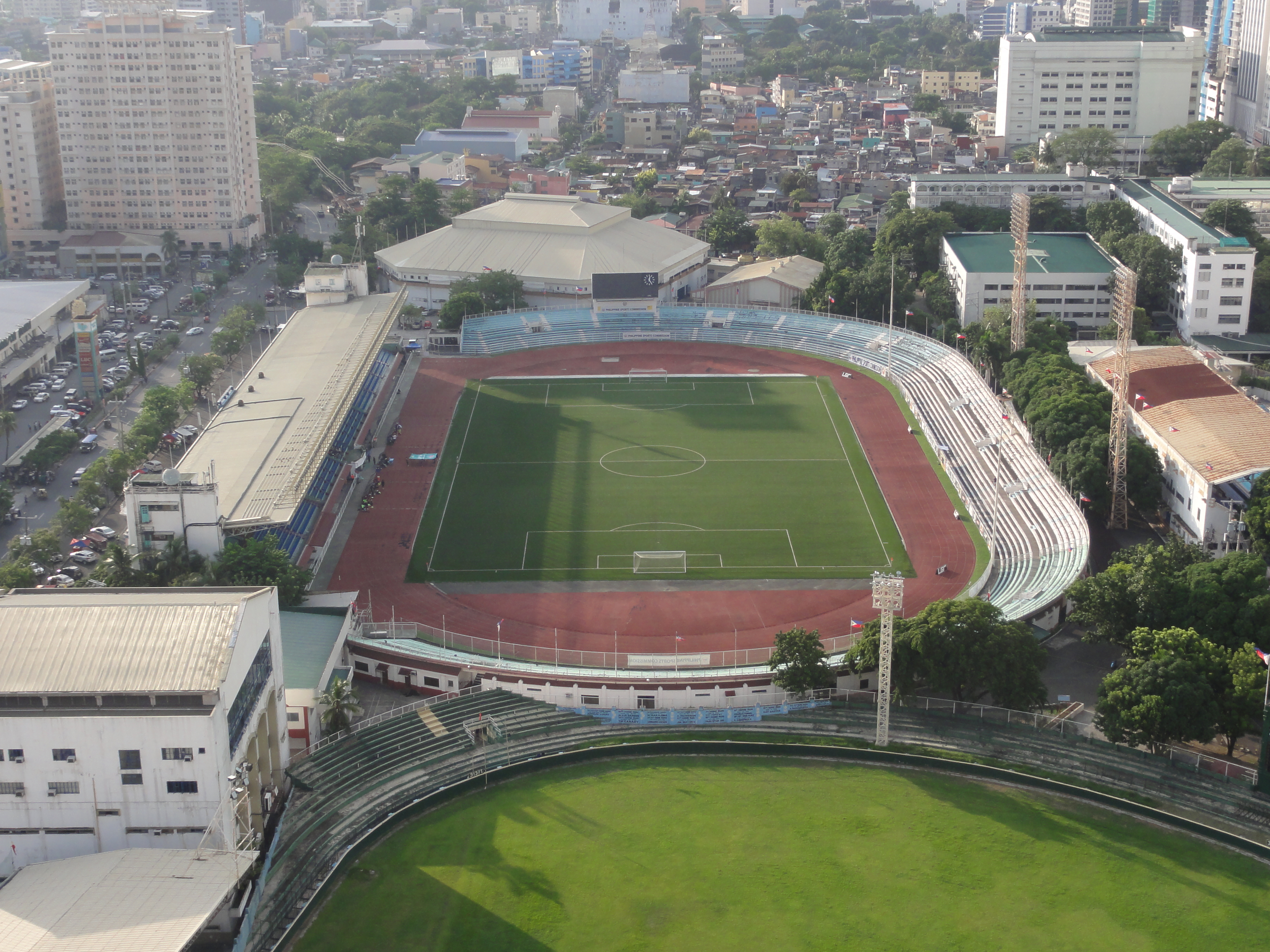

== Draw ==
The draw was held one day before the event.

Group A

- Taiwan
- Vietnam
- Philippines

Group B

- Singapore
- Pakistan
- Burma

Group C

- Japan
- Indonesia
- India

Group D

- South Korea
- Hong Kong
- Afghanistan

== Group Stage ==
=== Group A ===
Taiwan advanced to the semi-finals.

==== Table ====
Pos	Team	Pld	W	D	L	GF	GA	GR	Pts	Qualification
1	Taiwan	2	2	0	0	7	2	3.500	4	Qualification for the semi-finals
2	Vietnam	2	1	0	1	5	5	1.000	2	
3	Philippines	2	0	0	2	2	7	0.286	0	

==== Matches ====
1 May 1954

Taiwan	3–2	Vietnam
Li Dahui 17'; Zhu Yongqiang 37' (pen.); Yiu Cheuk-yin 50'		Nguyễn Văn Tư 41'; Trần Văn Ứng 65'

Rizal Memorial Stadium, Manila

3 May 1954

Philippines	2–3	Vietnam
Pacheco 51'; Razon 63'		Khe On 17'; Mi 31'; Quoc 79'

Rizal Memorial Stadium, Manila

6 May 1954

Philippines	0–4	Taiwan
		Jin Lusheng 5'; Zhu Yongqiang 43', 55'; Li Dahui 65'

Rizal Memorial Stadium, Manila

=== Group B ===
Burma advanced to the semi-finals.

==== Table ====
Pos	Team	Pld	W	D	L	GF	GA	GR	Pts	Qualification
1	Burma	2	1	1	0	3	2	1.500	3	Qualification for the semi-finals
2	Pakistan	2	1	0	1	7	4	1.750	2	
3	Singapore	2	0	1	1	3	7	0.429	1	

==== Matches ====
2 May 1954

Singapore	2–6	Pakistan
Pang Siang Hock 36', 45'		Jamil 39', 41'; Fakhri 42', 43', 47'; Kutty 52'

Rizal Memorial Stadium, Manila

4 May 1954

Burma	1–1	Singapore
Gordon Samuel 60'		Foo Hee Jong 31'

Rizal Memorial Stadium, Manila

5 May 1954

Burma	2–1	Pakistan
Gordon Samuel 31'; Sein Pe 37'		Fakhri 38'

Rizal Memorial Stadium, Manila

=== Group C ===
Indonesia advanced to the semi-finals.

==== Table ====
Pos	Team	Pld	W	D	L	GF	GA	GR	Pts	Qualification
1	Indonesia	2	2	0	0	9	3	3.000	4	Qualification for the semi-finals
2	India	2	1	0	1	3	6	0.500	2	
3	Japan	2	0	0	2	5	8	0.625	0	

==== Matches ====
1 May 1954

Japan	3–5	Indonesia
Kano 20' (pen.); Tokita 70'; Takabayashi 80'		Ramang 10'; Dalhar 25' (pen.), 41' (pen.); Tee San Liong 33', 36'

Rizal Memorial Stadium, Manila

3 May 1954

India	3–2	Japan
Moinuddin 6', 28'; Joe D'Sa 42'		Takabayashi 47'; Kawamoto 78'

Rizal Memorial Stadium, Manila

5 May 1954

India	0–4	Indonesia
		Dalhar 28' (pen.), 80'; Ramang 51', 69'

Rizal Memorial Stadium, Manila

=== Group D ===
South Korea advanced to the semi-finals.

==== Table ====
Pos	Team	Pld	W	D	L	GF	GA	GR	Pts	Qualification
1	South Korea	2	1	1	0	11	5	2.200	3	Qualification for the semi-finals
2	Hong Kong	2	1	1	0	7	5	1.400	3	
3	Afghanistan	2	0	0	2	4	12	0.333	0	

==== Matches ====
2 May 1954

South Korea	3–3	Hong Kong
Park Il-kap 20'; Chung Kook-chin 64'; Sung Nak-woon 78'		Chu Wing Wah 2'; Lo Kan Chuen 63'; Lee Yuk Tak 76'

Rizal Memorial Stadium, Manila

4 May 1954

South Korea	8–2	Afghanistan
Choi Chung-min 7'; Choi Kwang-seok 22'; Sung Nak-woon 23', 45', 55', 80'; Chung Nam-sik 42'; Chung Kook-chin 49'		Unknown (x2)

Rizal Memorial Stadium, Manila

6 May 1954

Hong Kong	4–2	Afghanistan
Santos 28'; Chen Zhigang 35'; Lee Yuk Tak 74'; Ho Cheng Yau 78'		Unknown 17', 23'

Rizal Memorial Stadium, Manila

== Semi-finals ==
Taiwan defeated Indonesia to advance to the gold medal match. Burma and South Korea drew 2–2 after extra time and South Korea advanced on drawing of lots.

7 May 1954

Taiwan	4–2	Indonesia
Li Dahui 10', 75'; Yiu Cheuk-yin 20'; Zhu Yongqiang 32'		Witarsa 5'; Siregar 71'

Rizal Memorial Stadium, Manila
7 May 1954

Burma	2–2 (a.e.t.)	South Korea
Unknown (x2)		Kang Chang-gi 18'; Choi Chung-min 71'

Rizal Memorial Stadium, Manila

== Bronze medal match ==
Burma defeated Indonesia 5–4 to win the bronze medal.

8 May 1954

Indonesia	4–5	Burma
Tee San Liong (x2); Dalhar; Ramang		Unknown (x5)

Rizal Memorial Stadium, Manila

== Gold medal match ==
Taiwan defeated South Korea 5–2 to win the gold medal.

8 May 1954

Taiwan	5–2	South Korea
Yiu Cheuk-yin 6'; Zhu Yongqiang 17' (pen.), 68'; Szeto Man 50'; Ho Ying-fan 82'		Choi Chung-min 30'; Park Il-kap 71'

Rizal Memorial Stadium, Manila

== Founding of the Asian Football Confederation ==
On 8 May 1954, football delegates from the countries present met and founded the Asian Football Confederation (AFC).
