= South Korea national football team =

Men's association football team

Korea Republic
- Nickname(s): 태극 전사, Taegeuk Jeonsa (Taegeuk Warriors) 아시아의 호랑이, Asia-ui Horangi (Tigers of Asia)
- Association: Korea Football Association (KFA)
- Confederation: AFC (Asia)
- Sub-confederation: EAFF (East Asia)
- Head coach: Robert Moreno (interim)
- Captain: Son Heung-min
- Most caps: Son Heung-min (153)
- Top scorer: Son Heung-min (59)
- FIFA code: KOR
First colours	Second colours

FIFA ranking
- Current: 32 (7 October 2026)
- Highest: 17 (December 1998)
- Lowest: 69 (November 2014 – January 2015)

First international
- South Korea 5–3 Mexico (London, England; 2 August 1948)

Biggest win
- South Korea 16–0 Nepal (Incheon, South Korea; 29 September 2003)

Biggest defeat
- South Korea 0–12 Sweden (London, England; 5 August 1948)

World Cup
- Appearances: 12 (first in 1954)
- Best result: Fourth place (2002)

Asian Cup
- Appearances: 15 (first in 1956)
- Best result: Champions (1956, 1960)

EAFF Championship
- Appearances: 10 (first in 2003)
- Best result: Champions (2003, 2008, 2015, 2017, 2019)

Confederations Cup
- Appearances: 1 (first in 2001)
- Best result: Group stage (2001)
Medal record
Men's football
AFC Asian Cup
Gold medal – first place	1956 Hong Kong
Gold medal – first place	1960 South Korea
Silver medal – second place	1972 Thailand
Silver medal – second place	1980 Kuwait
Silver medal – second place	1988 Qatar
Silver medal – second place	2015 Australia
Bronze medal – third place	1964 Israel
Bronze medal – third place	2000 Lebanon
Bronze medal – third place	2007 Indonesia, Malaysia, Thailand and Vietnam
Bronze medal – third place	2011 Qatar
Asian Games
Gold medal – first place	1970 Bangkok
Gold medal – first place	1978 Bangkok
Gold medal – first place	1986 Seoul
Silver medal – second place	1954 Manila
Silver medal – second place	1958 Tokyo
Silver medal – second place	1962 Jakarta
Bronze medal – third place	1990 Beijing
EAFF Championship
Gold medal – first place	2003 Japan
Gold medal – first place	2008 China
Gold medal – first place	2015 China
Gold medal – first place	2017 Japan
Gold medal – first place	2019 South Korea
Silver medal – second place	2010 Japan
Silver medal – second place	2022 Japan
Silver medal – second place	2025 South Korea
Bronze medal – third place	2013 South Korea
- Website: www.kfa.or.kr

- South Korea national football team
- Hangul: 대한민국 축구 국가대표팀
- Hanja: 大韓民國 蹴球 國家代表팀
- RR: Daehanminguk chukgu gukgadaepyotim
- MR: Taehanmin'guk ch'ukku kukkadaep'yot'im

The South Korea national football team (Korean: 대한민국 축구 국가대표팀; recognized as Korea Republic by FIFA) represents South Korea in men's international football and is governed by the Korea Football Association, a member of FIFA and the Asian Football Confederation (AFC).

South Korea has emerged as a major football power in Asia since the 1980s, having participated in eleven consecutive and twelve overall FIFA World Cup tournaments, the most for any Asian country. Despite initially going through five World Cup tournaments without winning a match, South Korea became the first (and so far only) Asian team to reach the semi-finals when they co-hosted the 2002 tournament with Japan. South Korea also has won two AFC Asian Cup titles, and finished as runners-up on four occasions. Furthermore, the team won three gold medals and three silver medals at the senior Asian Games.

The team is commonly nicknamed the "Reds" by both fans and the media due to the color of their primary kit. The national team's supporting group is officially referred to as the Red Devils.

== History ==
=== Early history ===
Korea (Joseon) was not introduced to the sport of association football until the late 19th century; it is often said that football in Korea dates to 1882, when Royal Navy sailors from HMS Flying Fish played a game while their vessel was visiting Incheon Port. Korea became a Japanese colony in 1905 and was annexed outright in 1910.

In 1921, the first All Joseon Football Tournament was held, and in 1928, the Joseon Football Association was organized, which created a foundation to disseminate and develop football in Korea. Korean teams participated in competitions with Japanese teams from around 1926; Joseon Football Club became a de facto national team for Koreans, and won the 1935 Emperor's Cup. Koreans also played for the Japan national team, most notably Kim Yong-sik, who played for Japan at the 1936 Summer Olympics.

The Joseon FA was reorganized in 1945 as Japanese occupation ended with the conclusion of World War II. Following the establishment of the South Korean state in the late 1940s, a new Korea Football Association (KFA) was founded in 1948 and joined FIFA, the international football governing body. The same year, the South Korean national team made its international debut and won 5–3 against Mexico at the 1948 Summer Olympics in London.

=== First World Cup team ===
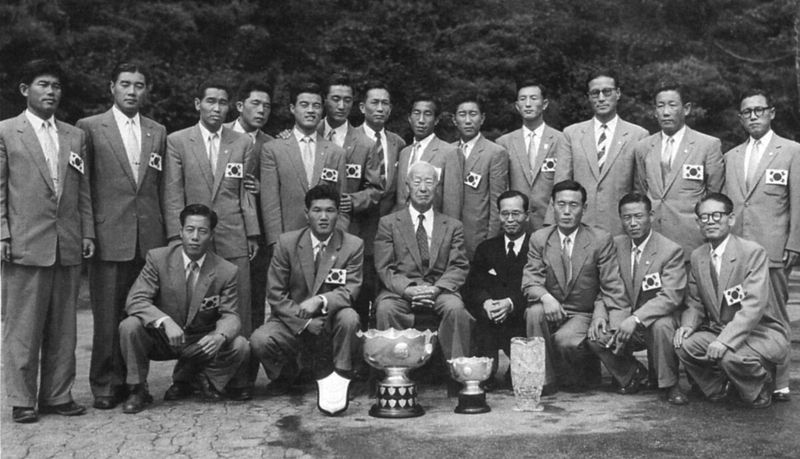
The South Korean team with the country's president Syngman Rhee after winning the 1956 AFC Asian Cup

In 1954, South Korea entered FIFA World Cup qualification for the first time, and qualified for the 1954 FIFA World Cup in Switzerland by beating Japan 7–3 on aggregate. South Korea were only the second Asian team to compete at a World Cup after the Dutch East Indies (Indonesia) in 1938, and the first fully-independent Asian nation to do so. South Korea lost their only two games by heavy margins: 9–0 against Hungary (the joint-heaviest defeat in World Cup history) and 7–0 against Turkey. Their third scheduled game, against West Germany, was never played because neither were seeded in their group, as per that tournament's rules. It would take thirty-two years before South Korea was able to participate at the World Cup again.

Two years later, South Korea won the inaugural AFC Asian Cup in 1956. They hosted the next edition in 1960 and successfully retained the title, beating South Vietnam, Israel, and Republic of China in the process. However, the South Korean players received fake medals, instead of the gold medals they had been promised, and returned them to the KFA. The KFA promised to give them real medals, but this did not occur until 2019. South Korea have not won the AFC Asian Cup since, something that has thus been attributed to the "curse of the fake gold medals."

=== Foundation of Yangzee ===
In 1965, the South Korean government was hesitant to play football matches against North Korea and thus withdrew from 1966 FIFA World Cup qualification to avoid possibly playing the northern neighbors. Kim Yong-sik, the KFA vice-president at that time, had evaluated North Korea as a world-class team. This would be proven true, as the North Koreans advanced to the quarter-finals at the 1966 FIFA World Cup in England.

In March 1967, the South Korean Central Intelligence Agency (KCIA) founded Yangzee FC, collecting footballers in South Korea to train them intensively. Yangzee players received benefits like exemption from military service, long-term overseas training and high salaries in return for intensive training. At the 1968 Summer Olympics qualification, South Korea was eliminated by goal difference, despite being tied with Japan, the group winners, on points. They also participated in the 1969 Asian Champion Club Tournament, finishing as runners-up. However, South Korea failed to qualify for the 1970 FIFA World Cup despite governmental support, and Yangzee was losing support as Kim Hyong-uk, the director of KCIA and supporter of the club, was dismissed from his post, and tensions between South and North Korea were beginning to subside. Yangzee was eventually dissolved in March 1970 without ever having played against North Korea, but players achieved a good result by winning the 1970 Asian Games.

=== Second World Cup team ===
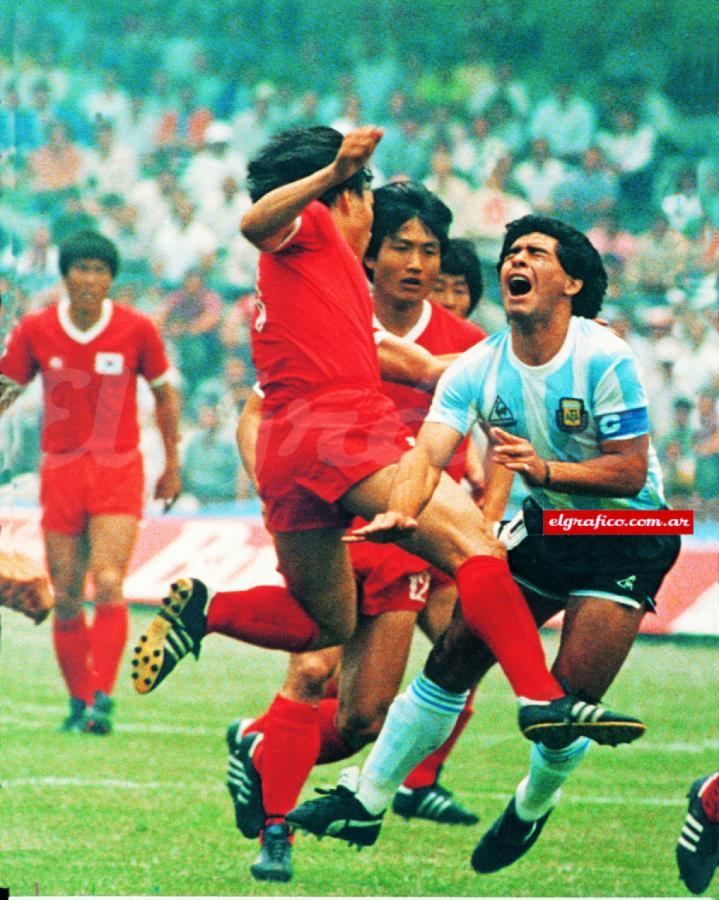
South Korean players marking Diego Maradona at the 1986 FIFA World Cup

In 1985, South Korea won the East Asian tournament of FIFA World Cup qualification including two victories against Japan in the final round, and sealed a spot at the World Cup for the first time since 1954. After one of the greatest forwards of German Bundesliga at the time, Cha Bum-kun, joined the existing champions, the South Korean squad for the 1986 FIFA World Cup was evaluated as the golden generation in their country.

South Korea lost 3–1 to the eventual champion Argentina but Park Chang-sun scored the first-ever South Korean World Cup goal in the first group match. They drew 1–1 with Bulgaria and faced the defending champion Italy in the last match. They conceded Alessandro Altobelli's opening goal, but Choi Soon-ho scored the equalizer outside the penalty area. However, Altobelli's second goal was followed by Cho Kwang-rae's fatal own goal, and South Korea lost 3–2 in the match despite Huh Jung-moo pulling one back. Afterwards, South Korean newscasts and journalists criticised the referee David Socha, claiming that his judgements about situations of the game were poor including the decision to award a penalty to Italy. South Korea redeemed their failure of World Cup success with a gold at the 1986 Asian Games.

=== Tragedy of Marseille ===
In 1997, Cha Bum-kun became the head coach going into FIFA World Cup qualification. South Korea consecutively won four early qualifiers against Kazakhstan, Uzbekistan, Japan, and the United Arab Emirates, and quickly solidified their position as first-place finishers of the group. At the 1998 FIFA World Cup in France, they lost their first match against Mexico 3–1. Ha Seok-ju scored a deflected free kick for the opening goal, but was then sent off only three minutes later for an ill-advised tackle. South Korea was then thoroughly outclassed by the Netherlands, managed by Guus Hiddink, losing 5–0 in Marseille. Cha was sacked in the middle of the group stage after the loss to the Netherlands. The only South Korean player to be praised from the match was the goalkeeper Kim Byung-ji, who conceded five of the Netherlands' 17 shots on target. The team then drew 1–1 against Belgium in their final group match.

=== Hiddink's magic ===
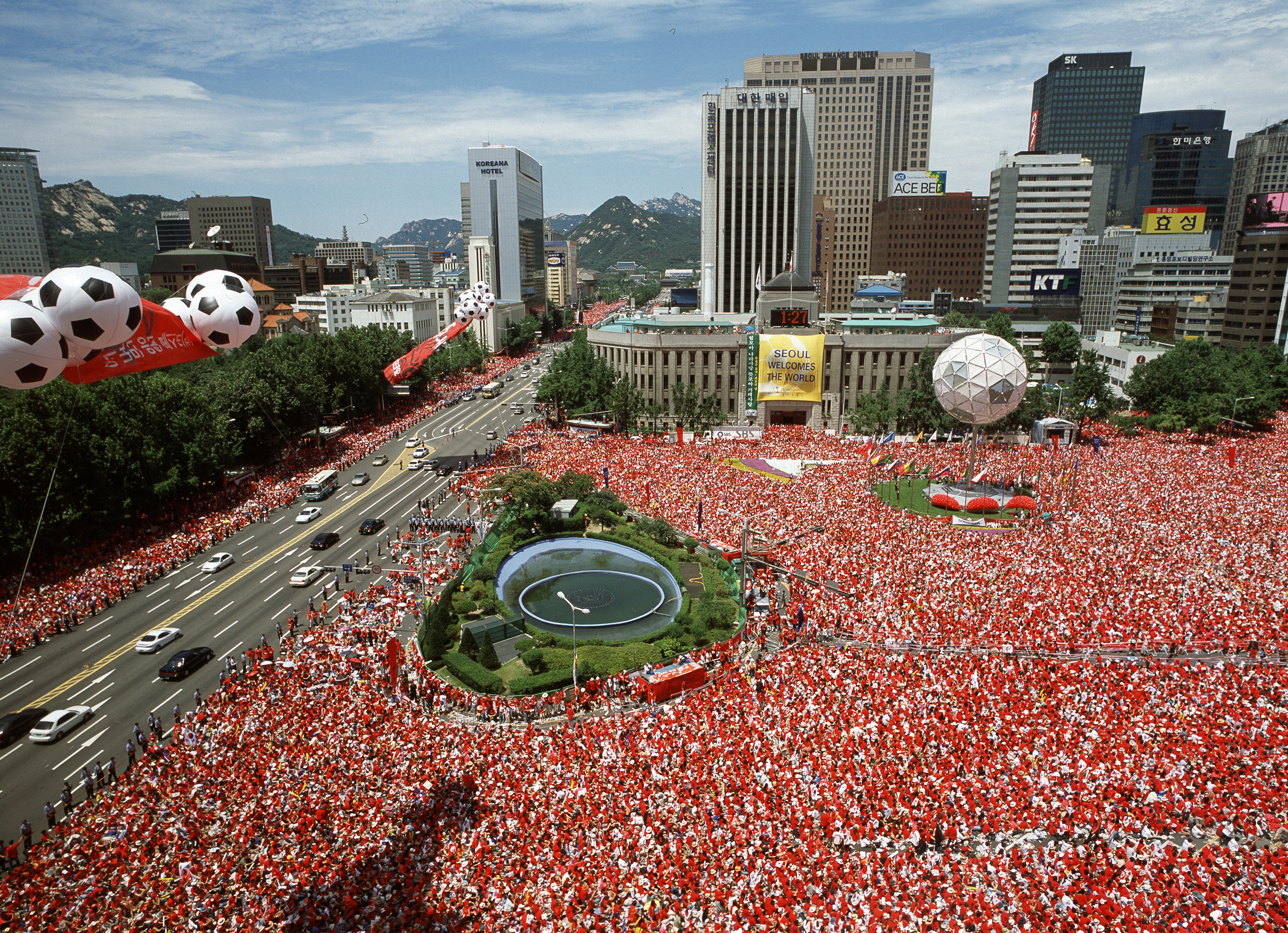

Seoul during the 2002 FIFA World Cup

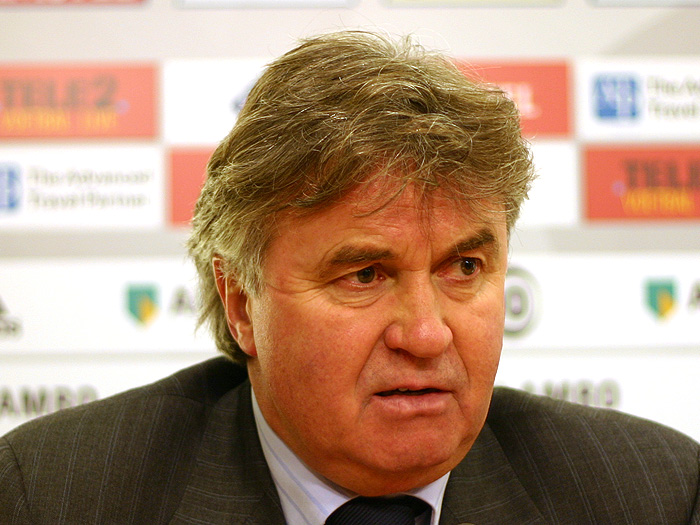
Guus Hiddink is widely regarded as the most successful manager in South Korean football history.

On 18 December 2000, the KFA named Dutch coach Guus Hiddink as the manager of the team for the 2002 FIFA World Cup, co-hosted in South Korea. At the 2001 FIFA Confederations Cup, they lost 5–0 against France, the eventual champions, and failed to advance to the semi-finals although defeating Australia and Mexico. South Korean journalists criticized Hiddink and gave him a nickname "Oh-dae-ppang", which means five to nothing in Korean, when South Korea lost 5–0 again in the friendly match against the Czech Republic after the Confederations Cup. At the 2002 CONCACAF Gold Cup, South Korea finished in fourth place with two draws and three losses without a win. However, they showed their improvement in friendly matches against European teams just before the World Cup.

South Korea co-hosted the 2002 World Cup tournament with Japan. Having never won a game in the World Cup previously, the South Korean team achieved their first ever victory in a World Cup with a 2–0 victory against Poland when the tournament began. Their next game was against the United States where they earned a 1–1 draw, with striker Ahn Jung-hwan scoring a late game equalizer. Their last game was against Portugal, who earned two red cards in the match, reducing them to nine men. Park Ji-sung scored in a 1–0 victory, allowing the South Korean team to qualify for the second round for the first time in their history. The team's success led to widespread euphoria from the South Korean public, with many people joining the Red Devils, which gained widespread attention with their passionate support of the team.

South Korea's second round opponents were Italy, who they defeated 2–1. The South Korean team was awarded an early penalty but Ahn Jung-hwan's effort was saved by Italian keeper Gianluigi Buffon. Christian Vieri then scored to put Italy ahead but Seol Ki-hyeon scored an equalizer in the 88th minute, allowing the game to go through to extra time. Francesco Totti was controversially sent off for an alleged dive and Ahn redeemed his missed penalty by scoring the winner with a headed golden goal, allowing them to advance to the quarter-final. South Korea faced Spain in the quarter-finals. Spain managed to score twice in this match, but both goals were disallowed by the referees. The game then went to the penalty shoot-out where South Korea won 5–3, thus becoming the first Asian team to reach the semi-finals. The South Korean team's run was halted by a 1–0 loss to Germany, and their tournament ended in fourth place after a loss to Turkey 3–2 in the third-place match.

Team captain Hong Myung-bo received the Bronze Ball as the third best player of the World Cup, the first Asian footballer to receive this award. In addition, Hong was named in the team of the tournament alongside teammate Yoo Sang-chul. This level of success was unprecedented for a country that had never won a World Cup match before. They went further than any Asian team, upsetting several established European teams in the process, leading to a rise in the popularity of football in the country. Hiddink became a national hero in South Korea and was granted honorary citizenship.

=== Era of Huh and Park ===
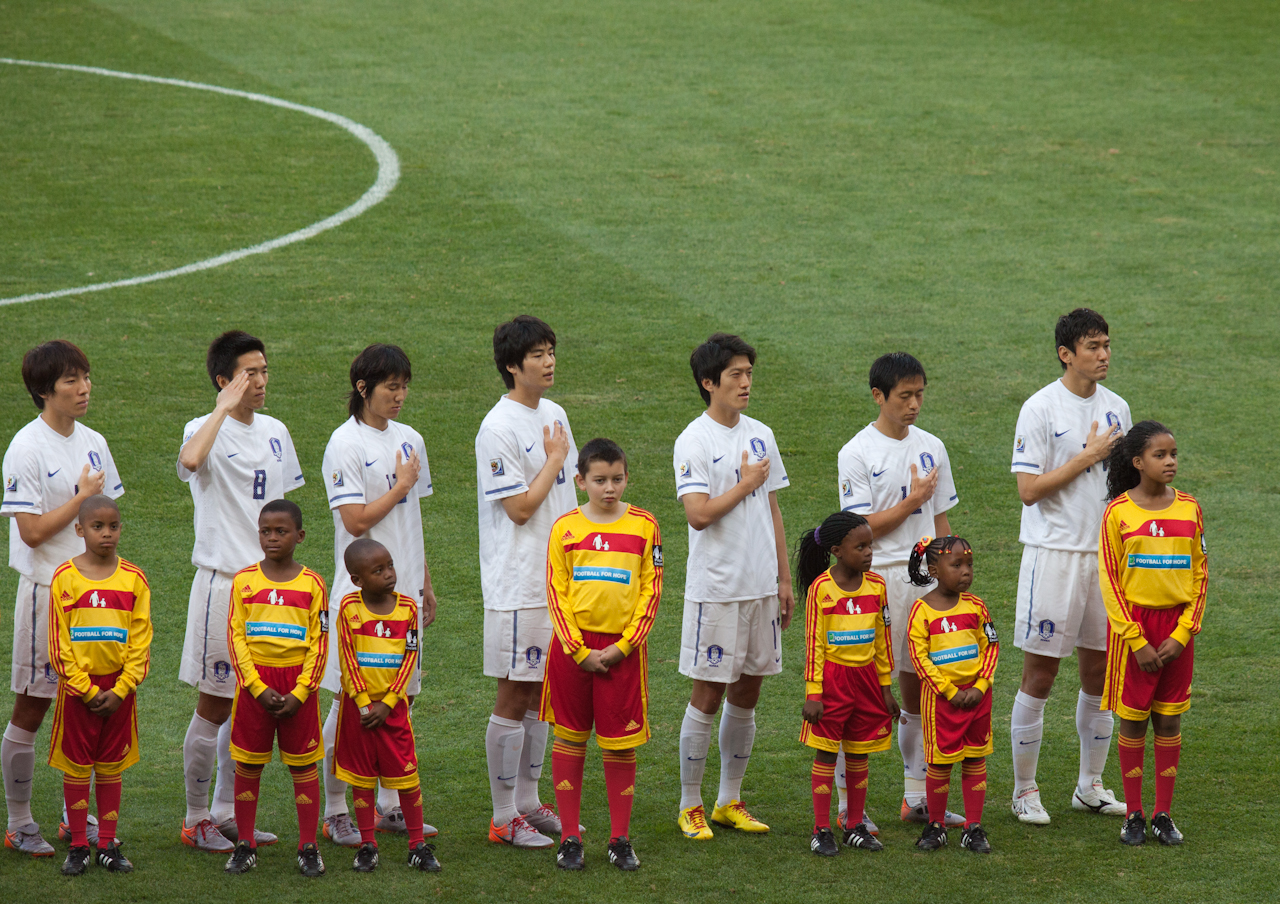
South Korean players saluting the national flag at the 2010 FIFA World Cup

In 2008, South Korea chose Hiddink's predecessor Huh Jung-moo as their manager again. Huh appointed Park Ji-sung, who got his international debut after being discovered by Huh in the past, as a new captain. Under Huh and Park, the South Korean team was undefeated for 27 consecutive games between 2008 and 2009. In the fourth round of the 2010 FIFA World Cup qualification, they recorded four wins and four draws without a loss against North Korea, Saudi Arabia, Iran and the United Arab Emirates.

At the 2010 FIFA World Cup in South Africa, they won their first game against Greece 2–0, with goals from Lee Jung-soo and Park Ji-sung. They then faced Argentina and suffered a 4–1 defeat, including an own goal by forward Park Chu-young. Their next result was a 2–2 draw in the match against Nigeria, with Lee Jung-soo and Park Chu-young scoring. This allowed them to make it to the knockout stage for the first time on foreign soil. In the round of 16 they met Uruguay, who took an early lead through Luis Suárez. South Korea equalized in the second half after Lee Chung-yong scored his second goal of the tournament but conceded to Suárez again in the 80th minute. Despite maintaining the majority of the possession in the second half, South Korea was unable to equalise again and were eliminated from the tournament.

=== Proactive football ===
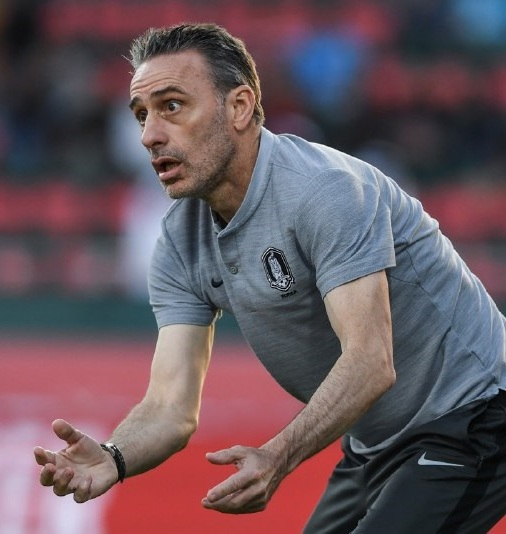
Paulo Bento was the longest-serving manager in South Korean national team history.

Kim Pan-gon, the KFA official in charge of finding a new manager, contracted Paulo Bento and his coaching team to set long-term goals after the 2018 FIFA World Cup. Bento showed a philosophy that wasn't dominated by the opposition's tactics and maintained his team's build-up play. However, South Korea had been familiar with reactive tactics that focus on defense. His style received negative assessments from a significant number of KFA's executives, and he came under fire from the South Korean media. Bento severed relations with the technical committee and managed the national team with only his coaching staff after Kim Pan-gon resigned from the association. Nevertheless, the national team players were attracted to his tactics and systematic training programs and strongly supported him.

Bento's team easily qualified for the 2022 FIFA World Cup in Qatar after scoring well against Asian teams, but the media still doubted that his proactive tactics would be effective against World Cup giants. Before the tournament, Son Heung-min, the Premier League Golden Boot winner and one of South Korea's key players, injured his eye socket and wasn't in optimal condition. At the World Cup, South Korea contested a goalless draw with Uruguay, and encountered a crisis after losing 3–2 to Ghana in the second match. Their defense failed to block all three of Ghana's shots on target, although their striker Cho Gue-sung scored two goals with headers. Bento was sent off for arguing with referee Anthony Taylor just after the match ended, and had to see South Korea's last group stage match against his homeland Portugal in the stands. However, South Korea defeated Portugal 2–1 with goals from Kim Young-gwon and Hwang Hee-chan, advancing to the knockout stage as Group H runners-up. Despite a 4–1 defeat to Brazil in the round of 16, the four-year challenge with Bento was finally appreciated by journalists and set a good direction for South Korean football.

== Team image ==
=== Nicknames ===
The South Korea national football team has been known or nicknamed as the Taegeuk Warriors (Korean: 태극전사) and the Tigers of Asia (Korean: 아시아의 호랑이).

=== Kits and crest ===
Red is the traditional shirt color of the South Korean national team, who are consequently nicknamed the "Reds", while the fans are called the "Red Devils". The away shirt has varied between white and blue. In 1994, the home shirt shifted from red to white, but in October 1995, red returned as the home color, paired with black shorts.

South Korea used to wear the country's flag as their shirt badge until 2001, when their tiger crest was unveiled. On 5 February 2020, the KFA announced a new, more simplistic logo. The emblem retained the tiger, albeit in a more minimalist design, enclosed in a rectangular frame. Red, blue and white, South Korea's traditional colors, have been maintained in the new logo.

==== Kit suppliers ====
Kit supplier	Period	Notes
Adidas, Asics, Kolon Sports, Pro-Specs, Weekend	1977–1986	South Korea contracted with Adidas as their first official kit sponsor, but they did not have an exclusive kit sponsor at that time.
Rapido (Weekend)	1987–1995	Signed a long-term contract with Weekend (renamed Rapido in January 1988) in 1987.
Nike	1996–present	Contracted at the end of 1995, and sponsored since 1 January 1996.

==== Kit deals ====
Kit supplier	Period	Contract date	Contract duration	Total	Annual	Ref.
Nike	1996–present	December 1995	1996–1997	$3 million	$1.5 million	
Nike	1996–present	16 December 1997	1998–2002	$38 million	$7.6 million	
Nike	1996–present	9 January 2003	2003–2007	$50 million	$10.0 million	
Nike	1996–present	23 October 2007	2008–2011	$49 million	$12.3 million	
Nike	1996–present	13 January 2012	2012–2019	$120 million	$15.0 million	
Nike	1996–present	20 January 2020	2020–2031	$204 million	$17.0 million	

=== Home stadium ===
The South Korea national team played their first home match at the Dongdaemun Stadium on 21 April 1956. The match was a qualifier for the 1956 AFC Asian Cup against the Philippines. They currently play their home matches at several stadiums, which are also used by K League clubs.

=== Rivalries ===
South Korea's biggest rival is Japan. The rivalry is an extension of a competitive rivalry between the two nations that goes beyond football, and some matches in the past have been tainted with controversy. South Korea leads the all-time series with 42 wins, 23 draws and 17 losses.

A rivalry has also developed with Iran. The two nations have played against each other officially since 1958, totalling 33 matches as of March 2022, including eleven World Cup qualifiers. Although the teams played against each other only once in the final match of the Asian Cup, in 1972, they have faced each other five consecutive times in the quarter-finals between 1996 and 2011, with each team recording two wins, two losses, and a draw. Iran leads the all-time series with 13 wins, 10 draws and 10 losses.

Another major rival is Australia. In head-to-head matches, each team achieved 9 wins in 29 encounters, and 11 matches ended in a draw. The two countries have also met in four matches at the Asian Cup, including the 2015 final, where Australia won 2–1 after extra time for their first ever Asian championship.

South Korea has had great success against China, as China failed to beat them in competitive matches for 32 years before finally winning in 2010. They also possess a strong rivalry with North Korea, though matches are infrequent due to diplomatic and security reasons.

=== Supporters ===
The official supporter group of the national team, the Red Devils, were founded in 1995. Known for their passionate support, they are commonly referred to as the 12th man. Their most common chant is "Dae~ Han-Min-Guk" (대~한민국), followed by five claps.

The phenomenon of fans publicly gathering outside stadiums to watch matches together was first observed by FIFA during the 2002 FIFA World Cup in South Korea and Japan, which later inspired the official FIFA Fan Fest, introduced at the 2006 World Cup in Germany.

== Recent results and fixtures ==
The following is a list of match results in the last 12 months, as well as any future matches that have been scheduled.

Win Draw Loss Fixture

=== 2026 ===
28 March Friendly	South Korea	0–4	Ivory Coast	Milton Keynes, England
14:00 UTC+0		Report	Guessand 35'; Adingra 45+1'; Godo 62'; Singo 90+3'	Stadium: Stadium MK; Attendance: 5,917; Referee: Ian McNabb (Northern Ireland)

31 March Friendly	Austria	1–0	South Korea	Vienna, Austria
20:45 UTC+2	Sabitzer 48'	Report		Stadium: Ernst-Happel-Stadion; Attendance: 35,300; Referee: Sander van der Eijk (Netherlands)

30 May Friendly	South Korea	5–0	Trinidad and Tobago	Provo, Utah, United States
19:00 UTC−6	Son Heung-min 40', 43' (pen.); Cho Gue-sung 65', 77'; Hwang Hee-chan 75' (pen.)	Report		Stadium: South Field; Attendance: 3,454; Referee: Victor Rivas (United States)

3 June Friendly	South Korea	1–0	El Salvador	Provo, Utah, United States
19:00 UTC−6	Lee Dong-gyeong 57'	Report		Stadium: South Field; Referee: Natalie Simon (United States)

11 June 2026 FIFA World Cup Group A	South Korea	2–1	Czech Republic	Zapopan, Mexico
20:00 UTC−6	Hwang In-beom 67'; Oh Hyeon-gyu 80'	Report	Krejčí 59'	Stadium: Estadio Akron; Attendance: 44,985; Referee: Amin Mohamed Omar (Egypt)

18 June 2026 FIFA World Cup Group A	Mexico	1–0	South Korea	Zapopan, Mexico
19:00 UTC−6	Romo 50'	Report		Stadium: Estadio Akron; Attendance: 45,522; Referee: Gustavo Tejera (Uruguay)

24 June 2026 FIFA World Cup Group A	South Africa	1–0	South Korea	Guadalupe, Mexico
19:00 UTC−6	Maseko 63'	Report		Stadium: Estadio BBVA; Attendance: 51,243; Referee: Facundo Tello (Argentina)

24 September Friendly	South Korea	3–0	Ecuador	Suwon, South Korea
20:00 UTC+9	Oh Hyeon-gyu 54'; Son Heung-min 58'; Lee Dong-gyeong 86'	Report		Stadium: Suwon World Cup Stadium; Attendance: 33,953; Referee: Shen Yinhao (China)

28 September Friendly	South Korea	1–4	Uruguay	Seoul, South Korea
20:00 UTC+9	Son Heung-min 80'	Report	Nunez 13', 62'; de Arrascaeta 27'; Kim Min-jae 43' (o.g.)	Stadium: Seoul World Cup Stadium; Attendance: 48,024; Referee: Ma Ning (China)

2 October Friendly	South Korea	0–0	Venezuela	Ulsan, South Korea
20:00 UTC+9		Report		Stadium: Ulsan Munsu Football Stadium; Attendance: 35,911; Referee: Alireza Faghani (Australia)

6 October Friendly	South Korea	2–0	Uzbekistan	Yongin, South Korea
20:00 UTC+9	Son Heung-min 6'; Oh Se-hun 60'	Report		Stadium: Yongin Mireu Stadium; Attendance: 24,587; Referee: Alex King (Australia)

13 November Friendly	Saudi Arabia	3–2	South Korea	Al Rayyan, Qatar
17:30 UTC+3	Al-Sahafi 45+1'; Kanno 57'; Al-Amri 59'	Report	Oh Hyeon-gyu 47'; Lee Jae-sung 69'	Stadium: Jassim bin Hamad Stadium; Referee: Mohammed Ahmed Al Shammari (Qatar)

17 November Friendly	Qatar	0–1	South Korea	Doha, Qatar
17:00 UTC+3		Report	Oh Se-hun 43'	Stadium: Abdullah bin Khalifa Stadium; Referee: Mohamed Ebrahim Saad (Bahrain)

== All-time results ==
As of 17 November 2026

Results by decade
Year	Pld	W	D	L	Win %	Matches
1948–1959	48	28	9	11	58.33	Matches
1960–1969	90	52	15	23	57.78	Matches
1970–1979	186	117	44	25	62.90	Matches
1980–1989	129	75	29	25	58.14	Matches
1990–1999	151	70	45	36	46.36	Matches
2000–2009	171	76	56	39	44.44	Matches
2010–2019	154	81	31	42	52.60	Matches
2020–present	85	49	18	18	57.65	Matches
Total	1,014	548	247	219	54.04	—

== Coaching staff ==
As of 10 September 2026

Current coaching staff
Position	Coach
Interim manager	(Spain) Robert Moreno
Assistant coach	(Spain) Eduardo Docampo
Coaches	(Spain) Jasint Magrina (Spain) Víctor Bravo (South Korea) Cho Yong-hyung
Goalkeeping coach	(Spain) Nico Bosch
Fitness coaches	(Spain) Javier Chocarro (South Korea) Lee Jae-hong

== Players ==
=== Current squad ===
The following players were called up to the friendly matches against Saudi Arabia and Qatar on 13 and 17 November 2026, respectively.
Caps and goals updated as of 17 November 2026, after the match against Qatar.

No.	Pos.	Player	Date of birth (age)	Caps	Goals	Club
1	GK	Kim Seung-gyu	30 September 1990 (age 36)	93	0	(Japan Football Association) FC Tokyo
12	GK	Song Bum-keun	15 October 1997 (age 29)	5	0	(Korea Football Association) Jeonbuk Hyundai Motors
21	GK	Jo Hyeon-woo	25 September 1991 (age 35)	49	0	(Korea Football Association) Ulsan HD
2	DF	Lee Myung-jae	4 November 1993 (age 33)	12	0	(Korea Football Association) Daejeon Hana Citizen
3	DF	Lee Han-beom	17 June 2002 (age 24)	16	0	(Royal Belgian Football Association) Club Brugge
4	DF	Kim Min-jae	15 November 1996 (age 30)	87	4	(German Football Association) Bayern Munich
5	DF	Kim Ji-soo	24 December 2004 (age 21)	2	0	(The Football Association) Brentford
15	DF	Choi Jun	17 April 1999 (age 27)	6	0	(Korea Football Association) FC Seoul
20	DF	Shin Min-ha	15 September 2005 (age 21)	0	0	(Korea Football Association) Gangwon FC
22	DF	Seol Young-woo	5 December 1998 (age 27)	41	0	(German Football Association) FC Augsburg
26	DF	Cho Hyun-taek	2 August 2001 (age 25)	7	0	(Korea Football Association) Ulsan HD
6	MF	Hwang In-beom	20 September 1996 (age 30)	80	7	(Portuguese Football Federation) Porto
8	MF	Kim Bong-soo	26 December 1999 (age 26)	7	0	(Korea Football Association) Daejeon Hana Citizen
10	MF	Lee Jae-sung	10 August 1992 (age 34)	112	16	(German Football Association) Mainz 05
11	MF	Hwang Hee-chan	26 January 1996 (age 30)	86	17	(German Football Association) Schalke 04
13	MF	Jeong Woo-yeong	20 September 1999 (age 27)	23	4	(German Football Association) Union Berlin
16	MF	Park Jin-seob	23 October 1995 (age 31)	21	1	(Chinese Football Association) Zhejiang FC
17	MF	Song Min-kyu	12 September 1999 (age 27)	17	1	(Portuguese Football Federation) Nacional
19	MF	Lee Kang-in	19 February 2001 (age 25)	55	11	(Royal Spanish Football Federation) Atlético Madrid
23	MF	Eom Ji-sung	9 May 2002 (age 24)	13	2	(Football Association of Wales) Swansea City
24	MF	Park Tae-jun	19 January 1999 (age 27)	3	0	(Korea Football Association) Gimcheon Sangmu
25	MF	Son Jeong-beom	28 September 2007 (age 19)	0	0	(Korea Football Association) FC Seoul
7	FW	Son Heung-min (captain)	8 July 1992 (age 34)	153	59	(United States Soccer Federation) Los Angeles FC
9	FW	Oh Se-hun	15 January 1999 (age 27)	16	4	(Japan Football Association) Shimizu S-Pulse
14	FW	Lee Dong-gyeong	20 September 1997 (age 29)	22	5	(Korea Football Association) Ulsan HD
18	FW	Oh Hyeon-gyu	12 April 2001 (age 25)	36	9	(Turkish Football Federation) Beşiktaş

=== Recent call-ups ===
The following players have also been called up to the South Korea squad within the last twelve months.

Pos.	Player	Date of birth (age)	Caps	Goals	Club	Latest call-up
GK	Gu Sung-yun	27 June 1994 (age 32)	5	0	(South Korea) FC Seoul	v. Uzbekistan, 6 October 2026
GK	Yun Ki-wook	10 October 2006 (age 20)	0	0	(South Korea) FC Seoul	2026 FIFA World Cup ^{PRE}
DF	Lee Tae-seok	28 July 2002 (age 24)	19	1	Austria Wien	v. Uzbekistan, 6 October 2026
DF	Kim Tae-hyeon	17 September 2000 (age 26)	11	0	(Japan) Kashima Antlers	v. Uzbekistan, 6 October 2026
DF	Cho Wi-je	25 August 2001 (age 25)	3	0	(South Korea) Jeonbuk Hyundai Motors	v. Uzbekistan, 6 October 2026
DF	Kim Tae-hyun	19 December 1996 (age 29)	3	0	(South Korea) Jeonbuk Hyundai Motors	v. Uzbekistan, 6 October 2026
DF	Kim Geon-hui	16 September 2002 (age 24)	0	0	(South Korea) Incheon United	v. Uzbekistan, 6 October 2026
DF	Kim Moon-hwan	1 August 1995 (age 31)	36	0	(South Korea) Daejeon Hana Citizen	2026 FIFA World Cup
DF	Jens Castrop	29 July 2003 (age 23)	8	0	(Germany) Borussia Mönchengladbach	2026 FIFA World Cup
DF	Lee Gi-hyuk	7 July 2000 (age 26)	6	0	(South Korea) Gangwon FC	2026 FIFA World Cup
DF	Cho Yu-min	17 November 1996 (age 30)	19	0	(Japan) Tokyo Verdy	2026 FIFA World Cup ^{INJ}
DF	Kim Ju-sung	12 December 2000 (age 25)	8	1	(Japan) Sanfrecce Hiroshima	v. Austria, 31 March 2026
MF	Jeong Seung-won	27 February 1997 (age 29)	5	0	(South Korea) FC Seoul	v. Uzbekistan, 6 October 2026
MF	Kim Min-su	19 January 2006 (age 20)	3	0	(Scotland) Rangers	v. Uzbekistan, 6 October 2026
MF	Paik Seung-ho	17 March 1997 (age 29)	30	3	(England) Birmingham City	v. Uruguay, 28 September 2026 ^{INJ}
MF	Kim Jin-gyu	24 February 1997 (age 29)	24	3	(South Korea) Jeonbuk Hyundai Motors	2026 FIFA World Cup
MF	Bae Jun-ho	21 August 2003 (age 23)	13	2	(England) Stoke City	2026 FIFA World Cup
MF	Yang Hyun-jun	25 May 2002 (age 24)	10	0	(Scotland) Celtic	2026 FIFA World Cup
MF	Kang Sang-yoon	31 May 2004 (age 22)	3	1	(South Korea) Jeonbuk Hyundai Motors	2026 FIFA World Cup ^{PRE}
MF	Hong Hyun-seok	16 June 1999 (age 27)	16	0	(Denmark) Midtjylland	v. Austria, 31 March 2026
MF	Kwon Hyeok-kyu	13 March 2001 (age 25)	2	0	(Germany) Karlsruher SC	v. Austria, 31 March 2026
FW	Cho Gue-sung	25 January 1998 (age 28)	46	12	(Denmark) Midtjylland	v. Uruguay, 28 September 2026 ^{INJ}
Notes: ^{INJ} = Withdrew due to injury; ^{PRE} = Preliminary squad

=== Hall of Fame ===
The following players were inducted into the official Hall of Fame.

Year	Inductee	Ref.
2005	Kim Yong-sik	
2005	Hong Deok-young	
2005	Lee Hoe-taik	
2005	Cha Bum-kun	

== Individual records ==
As of 17 November 2026

Players in bold are still active with South Korea.

=== Most appearances ===
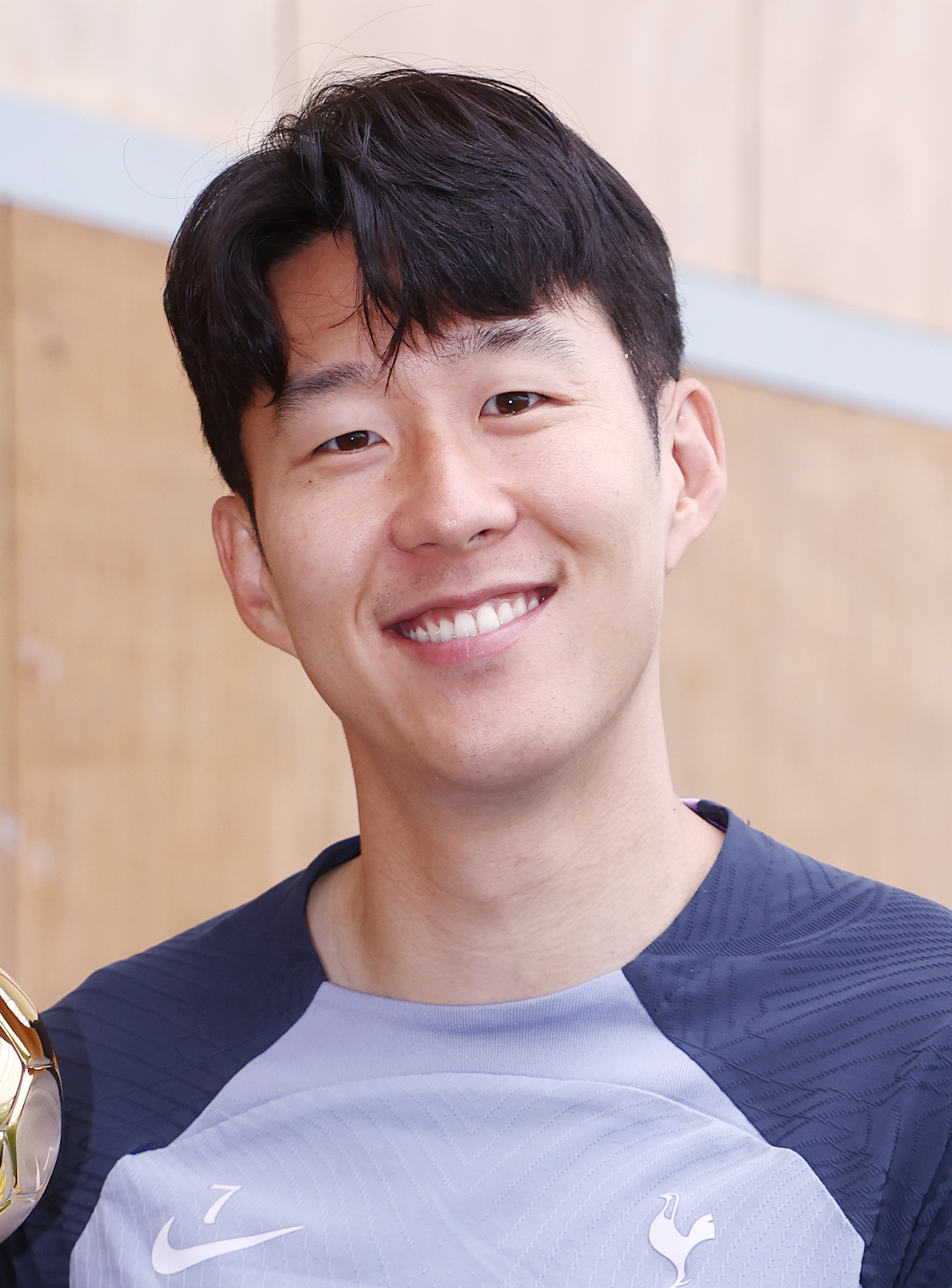
Son Heung-min is South Korea's most-capped player with 153 appearances and top goalscorer with 59 goals.

Rank	Player	Caps	Goals	Career
1	**Son Heung-min**	153	59	2010–present
2	Cha Bum-kun	136	58	1972–1986
2	Hong Myung-bo	136	10	1990–2002
4	Lee Woon-jae	133	0	1994–2010
5	Lee Young-pyo	127	5	1999–2011
6	Kim Ho-kon	124	5	1971–1979
6	Yoo Sang-chul	124	18	1994–2005
8	Cho Young-jeung	113	1	1975–1986
9	Kim Young-gwon	112	7	2010–2024
9	**Lee Jae-sung**	112	16	2015–present

=== Top goalscorers ===
Rank	Player	Goals	Caps	Ratio	Career
1	**Son Heung-min**	59	153	0.39	2010–present
2	Cha Bum-kun	58	136	0.43	1972–1986
3	Hwang Sun-hong	50	103	0.49	1988–2002
4	Park Lee-chun	36	88	0.41	1969–1974
5	Kim Jae-han	33	58	0.57	1972–1979
5	Lee Dong-gook	33	105	0.31	1998–2017
7	Kim Do-hoon	30	72	0.42	1994–2003
7	Choi Soon-ho	30	96	0.31	1980–1991
7	Huh Jung-moo	30	104	0.29	1974–1986
10	Choi Yong-soo	27	69	0.39	1995–2003
10	Lee Young-moo	27	85	0.32	1975–1981
10	Kim Jin-kook	27	97	0.28	1972–1978

== Competitive record ==
Champions Runners-up Third place Tournament played on home soil

=== FIFA World Cup ===
FIFA World Cup record									Qualification record					
Year	Round	Pld	W	D	L	GF	GA	Squad	Pld	W	D	L	GF	GA
1930 to 1938	Part of Japan								Part of Japan					
(Brazil) 1950	Did not enter								Did not enter					
(Switzerland) 1954	Group stage	2	0	0	2	0	16	Squad	2	1	1	0	7	3
(Sweden) 1958	Did not enter								Entry denied by FIFA					
(Chile) 1962	Did not qualify								4	2	0	2	6	9
(England) 1966	Did not enter								Did not enter					
(Mexico) 1970	Did not qualify								4	1	2	1	6	5
(West Germany) 1974	Did not qualify								8	3	4	1	10	4
(Argentina) 1978	Did not qualify								12	5	6	1	16	9
(Spain) 1982	Did not qualify								3	2	0	1	7	4
(Mexico) 1986	Group stage	3	0	1	2	4	7	Squad	8	7	0	1	17	3
(Italy) 1990	Group stage	3	0	0	3	1	6	Squad	11	9	2	0	30	1
(United States) 1994	Group stage	3	0	2	1	4	5	Squad	13	9	3	1	32	5
(France) 1998	Group stage	3	0	1	2	2	9	Squad	12	9	2	1	28	8
(South Korea) (Japan) 2002	Fourth place	7	3	2	2	8	6	Squad	Qualified as hosts					
(Germany) 2006	Group stage	3	1	1	1	3	4	Squad	12	7	3	2	18	7
(South Africa) 2010	Round of 16	4	1	1	2	6	8	Squad	14	7	7	0	22	7
(Brazil) 2014	Group stage	3	0	1	2	3	6	Squad	14	8	3	3	27	11
(Russia) 2018	Group stage	3	1	0	2	3	3	Squad	18	12	3	3	38	10
(Qatar) 2022	Round of 16	4	1	1	2	5	8	Squad	16	12	3	1	35	4
(Canada) (Mexico) (United States) 2026	Group stage	3	1	0	2	2	3	Squad	16	11	5	0	40	8
(Morocco) (Portugal) (Spain) 2030	To be determined								To be determined					
(Saudi Arabia) 2034	To be determined								To be determined					
Total	Fourth place	41	8	10	23	41	81	12/20 (Note: Statistics since 1948, when South Korea became a member of FIFA.)	167	105	44	18	339	98

=== Summer Olympics ===
Football at the Summer Olympics has been an under-23 tournament since 1992.

Summer Olympics record									Qualification record					
Year	Round	Pld	W	D	L	GF	GA	Squad	Pld	W	D	L	GF	GA
1900 to 1908	Part of the Korean Empire								Part of the Korean Empire					
1912 to 1936	Part of Japan								Part of Japan					
(United Kingdom) 1948	Quarter-finals	2	1	0	1	5	15	Squad	Directly qualified					
(Finland) 1952	Did not enter								Did not enter					
(Australia) 1956	Did not qualify								2	1	0	1	2	2
(Italy) 1960	Did not qualify								4	2	0	2	4	4
(Japan) 1964	Group stage	3 (Note: Includes one unofficial match against Brazil Olympic.)	0	0	3	1	20	Squad	4	2	1	1	7	4
(Mexico) 1968	Did not qualify								5	4	1	0	17	5
(West Germany) 1972	Did not qualify								4	3	0	1	16	2
(Canada) 1976	Did not qualify								6	3	2	1	10	5
(Soviet Union) 1980	Did not qualify								6	4	0	2	16	6
(United States) 1984	Did not qualify								11	5	3	3	19	11
(South Korea) 1988	Group stage	3 (Note: Includes two unofficial matches against the Soviet Union Olympic and Argentina Olympic.)	0	2	1	1	2	Squad	Qualified as hosts					
1992 to present	Entered with the under-23 team								Entered with the under-23 team					
Total	Quarter-finals	8	1	2	5	7	37	3/11 (Note: Statistics since 1947, when South Korea became a member of the International Olympic Committee.)	42	24	7	11	91	39

=== AFC Asian Cup ===
AFC Asian Cup record									Qualification record					
Year	Round	Pld	W	D	L	GF	GA	Squad	Pld	W	D	L	GF	GA
(British Hong Kong) 1956	Champions	3	2	1	0	9	6	Squad	4	4	0	0	9	1
(South Korea) 1960	Champions	3	3	0	0	9	1	Squad	Qualified as hosts					
(Israel) 1964	Third place	3 (Note: South Korea played with their "B" team.)	1	0	2	2	4	Squad	Direct entry					
(Pahlavi Iran) 1968	Did not qualify								4	1	1	2	9	4
1972	Runners-up	5	1	2	2	7	6	Squad	Direct entry					
(Pahlavi Iran) 1976	Did not qualify								4	2	0	2	3	3
(Kuwait) 1980	Runners-up	6	4	1	1	12	6	Squad	3	3	0	0	10	1
(Singapore) 1984	Group stage	4	0	2	2	1	3	Squad	4	3	1	0	13	0
(Qatar) 1988	Runners-up	6	5	1	0	11	3	Squad	3	1	1	1	5	3
(Japan) 1992	Did not qualify								2	1	0	1	7	2
(United Arab Emirates) 1996	Quarter-finals	4	1	1	2	7	11	Squad	3	3	0	0	17	0
(Lebanon) 2000	Third place	6	3	1	2	9	6	Squad	3	3	0	0	19	0
(China) 2004	Quarter-finals	4	2	1	1	9	4	Squad	6	4	0	2	30	4
(Indonesia) (Malaysia) (Vietnam) 2007	Third place	6	1	4	1	3	3	Squad	6	3	2	1	15	5
(Qatar) 2011	Third place	6	4	2	0	13	7	Squad	Directly qualified					
(Australia) 2015	Runners-up	6	5	0	1	8	2	Squad	Directly qualified					
(United Arab Emirates) 2019	Quarter-finals	5	4	0	1	6	2	Squad	8	8	0	0	27	0
(Qatar) 2023	Semi-finals	6	2	3	1	11	10	Squad	6	5	1	0	22	1
(Saudi Arabia) 2027	Qualified								6	5	1	0	20	1
Total	Champions	73	38	19	16	117	74	16/19	62	46	7	9	206	25

=== Asian Games ===
Football at the Asian Games has been an under-23 tournament since 2002.

Asian Games record
Year	Round	Pld	W	D	L	GF	GA	Squad
(India) 1951	Did not enter							
(Philippines) 1954	Silver medalists	4	1	2	1	15	12	Squad
(Japan) 1958	Silver medalists	5	4	0	1	15	6	Squad
(Indonesia) 1962	Silver medalists	5	4	0	1	9	5	Squad
1966	First round	2	0	0	2	0	4	Squad
1970	Gold medalists	6	3	2	1	5	3	Squad
(Iran) 1974	Second round	5	1	1	3	4	10	Squad
1978	Gold medalists	7	6	1	0	15	3	Squad
(India) 1982	Group stage	3	1	0	2	4	3	Squad
(South Korea) 1986	Gold medalists	6	4	2	0	14	3	Squad
(China) 1990	Bronze medalists	6	5	0	1	18	1	Squad
(Japan) 1994	Fourth place	6	3	0	3	17	7	Squad
1998	Quarter-finals	6	4	0	2	12	6	Squad
2002 to present	Entered with the under-23 team							
Total	Gold medalists	61	36	8	17	128	63	12/13

=== EAFF Championship ===
EAFF Championship record
Year	Round	Pld	W	D	L	GF	GA	Squad
(Japan) 2003	Champions	3	2	1	0	4	1	Squad
(South Korea) 2005	Fourth place	3	0	2	1	1	2	Squad
(China) 2008	Champions	3	1	2	0	5	4	Squad
(Japan) 2010	Runners-up	3	2	0	1	8	4	Squad
(South Korea) 2013	Third place	3	0	2	1	1	2	Squad
(China) 2015	Champions	3	1	2	0	3	1	Squad
(Japan) 2017	Champions	3	2	1	0	7	3	Squad
(South Korea) 2019	Champions	3	3	0	0	4	0	Squad
(Japan) 2022	Runners-up	3	2	0	1	6	3	Squad
(South Korea) 2025	Runners-up	3	2	0	1	5	1	Squad
Total	Champions	30	15	10	5	44	21	10/10

=== Other competitions ===
Competition	Round	Pld	W	D	L	GF	GA	Squad
(United States) 2000 CONCACAF Gold Cup	Group stage	2	0	2	0	2	2	Squad
(South Korea) (Japan) 2001 FIFA Confederations Cup	Group stage	3	2	0	1	3	6	Squad
(United States) 2002 CONCACAF Gold Cup	Fourth place	5	0	2	3	3	7	Squad

== Head-to-head record ==
The following table shows South Korea's head-to-head record, correct as of 17 November 2026.

Team	Pld	W	D	L	GF	GA	GD	Win %
Afghanistan	1	1	0	0	8	2	+6	100.00
Algeria	2	1	0	1	4	4	+0	50.00
Angola	1	1	0	0	1	0	+1	100.00
Argentina	3	0	0	3	2	8	−6	0.00
Australia (list)	29	9	11	9	30	29	+1	31.03
Austria	1	0	0	1	0	1	−1	0.00
Bahrain	17	12	4	1	40	12	+28	70.59
Bangladesh	2	2	0	0	13	0	+13	100.00
Belarus	1	0	0	1	0	1	−1	0.00
Belgium	4	0	1	3	2	6	−4	0.00
Bolivia	4	2	2	0	3	0	+3	50.00
Bosnia and Herzegovina	2	1	0	1	3	3	+0	50.00
Brazil	9	1	0	8	6	25	−19	11.11
Brunei	1	1	0	0	3	0	+3	100.00
Bulgaria	2	0	1	1	1	2	−1	0.00
Burkina Faso	1	1	0	0	1	0	+1	100.00
Cambodia	7	6	0	1	22	4	+18	85.71
Cameroon	5	3	2	0	10	3	+7	60.00
Canada	5	2	1	2	5	4	+1	40.00
Chile	3	1	1	1	2	1	+1	33.33
China (list)	39	24	13	2	59	26	+33	61.54
Chinese Taipei	21	14	1	6	50	19	+31	66.67
Colombia	8	4	3	1	14	9	+5	50.00
Costa Rica	10	4	3	3	13	12	+1	40.00
Croatia	7	2	2	3	7	11	−4	28.57
Cuba	1	0	1	0	0	0	+0	0.00
Czech Republic (Note: Including Czechoslovakia.)	6	2	2	2	7	15	−8	33.33
Denmark	2	0	1	1	1	3	−2	0.00
Ecuador	3	2	0	1	6	2	+4	66.67
Egypt	18	6	7	5	18	21	−3	33.33
El Salvador	2	1	1	0	2	1	+1	50.00
England	1	0	1	0	1	1	+0	0.00
Finland	3	3	0	0	5	0	+5	100.00
France	3	0	1	2	3	9	−6	0.00
Georgia	1	0	1	0	2	2	+0	0.00
Germany	4	2	0	2	7	5	+2	50.00
Ghana	8	4	0	4	11	14	−3	50.00
Greece	4	3	1	0	6	1	+5	75.00
Guam	1	1	0	0	9	0	+9	100.00
Guatemala	3	1	1	1	4	3	+1	33.33
Haiti	1	1	0	0	4	1	+3	100.00
Honduras	3	3	0	0	9	0	+9	100.00
Hong Kong	30	23	5	2	71	21	+50	76.67
Hungary	2	0	0	2	0	10	−10	0.00
Iceland	2	2	0	0	6	1	+5	100.00
India	19	14	2	3	48	12	+36	73.68
Indonesia	36	30	4	2	84	19	+65	83.33
Iran	33	10	10	13	36	34	+2	30.30
Iraq	25	11	12	2	32	16	+16	44.00
Israel	11	5	4	2	17	12	+5	45.45
Italy	2	1	0	1	4	4	+0	50.00
Ivory Coast	2	1	0	1	2	4	−2	50.00
Jamaica	4	2	2	0	7	3	+4	50.00
Japan (list)	82	42	23	17	124	77	+47	51.22
Jordan	9	4	4	1	10	7	+3	44.44
Kazakhstan	2	1	1	0	4	1	+3	50.00
Kuwait	26	14	4	8	37	21	+16	53.85
Kyrgyzstan	1	1	0	0	1	0	+1	100.00
Laos	5	5	0	0	28	0	+28	100.00
Latvia	2	2	0	0	2	0	+2	100.00
Lebanon	16	12	3	1	28	5	+23	75.00
Libya	1	1	0	0	4	0	+4	100.00
Macau	3	3	0	0	11	2	+9	100.00
Malaysia	47	26	13	8	81	45	+36	55.32
Maldives	2	1	1	0	2	0	+2	50.00
Mali	1	1	0	0	3	1	+2	100.00
Malta	2	1	1	0	3	2	+1	50.00
Mexico	16	4	3	9	20	32	−12	25.00
Moldova	2	2	0	0	5	0	+5	100.00
Mongolia	1	1	0	0	6	0	+6	100.00
Morocco	2	0	1	1	3	5	−2	0.00
Myanmar	27	15	7	5	42	15	+27	55.56
Nepal	7	7	0	0	53	0	+53	100.00
Netherlands	2	0	0	2	0	7	−7	0.00
New Zealand	7	6	1	0	10	1	+9	85.71
Nigeria	5	3	2	0	9	6	+3	60.00
North Korea (list)	17	7	9	1	14	6	+8	41.18
North Macedonia	2	1	1	0	4	3	+1	50.00
Northern Ireland	1	0	0	1	1	2	−1	0.00
Norway	4	1	1	2	5	6	−1	25.00
Oman	7	5	1	1	14	6	+8	71.43
Pakistan	2	2	0	0	13	0	+13	100.00
Palestine	2	0	2	0	1	1	+0	0.00
Panama	1	0	1	0	2	2	+0	0.00
Paraguay	8	3	4	1	10	7	+3	37.50
Peru	3	0	1	2	0	5	−5	0.00
Philippines	8	8	0	0	37	0	+37	100.00
Poland	2	1	0	1	4	3	+1	50.00
Portugal	2	2	0	0	3	1	+2	100.00
Qatar	12	7	2	3	20	13	+7	58.33
Romania	1	0	0	1	1	2	−1	0.00
Russia	3	0	1	2	4	7	−3	0.00
Saudi Arabia	20	5	9	6	22	21	+1	25.00
Scotland	1	1	0	0	4	1	+3	100.00
Senegal	4	1	1	2	3	4	−1	25.00
Serbia	3	1	1	1	3	3	+0	33.33
Serbia and Montenegro	1	1	0	0	2	0	+2	100.00
Singapore	28	23	3	2	97	19	+78	82.14
Slovakia	1	0	1	0	0	0	+0	0.00
South Africa	1	0	0	1	0	1	−1	0.00
South Yemen	1	1	0	0	3	0	+3	100.00
Spain	6	0	2	4	5	16	−11	0.00
Sri Lanka	3	3	0	0	19	0	+19	100.00
Sudan	1	1	0	0	8	0	+8	100.00
Sweden	5	0	2	3	3	18	−15	0.00
Switzerland	2	1	0	1	2	3	−1	50.00
Syria	10	6	3	1	12	5	+7	60.00
Tajikistan	1	1	0	0	4	1	+3	100.00
Thailand	47	31	8	8	96	37	+59	65.96
Togo	1	1	0	0	2	1	+1	100.00
Trinidad and Tobago	2	1	1	0	6	1	+5	50.00
Tunisia	3	1	1	1	4	1	+3	33.33
Turkey	7	1	2	4	4	13	−9	14.29
Turkmenistan	5	4	0	1	16	4	+12	80.00
Ukraine	2	2	0	0	3	0	+3	100.00
United Arab Emirates	21	13	5	3	38	14	+24	61.90
United States	12	6	3	3	12	8	+4	50.00
Uruguay	11	1	2	8	8	19	−11	9.09
Uzbekistan	17	12	4	1	36	14	+22	70.59
Venezuela	2	1	1	0	3	1	+2	50.00
Vietnam (Note: Including South Vietnam.)	25	17	6	2	66	21	+45	68.00
Wales	1	0	1	0	0	0	+0	0.00
Yemen (Note: Including North Yemen.)	1	1	0	0	6	0	+6	100.00
Yugoslavia (Note: Including SFR Yugoslavia and FR Yugoslavia.)	7	0	3	4	4	13	−9	0.00
Zambia	4	2	0	2	10	8	+2	50.00
Total	1,014	548	247	219	1,821	934	+887	54.04

== Honours ==
=== Intercontinental ===
- Afro-Asian Cup of Nations

Champions: 1987

=== Continental ===
- AFC Asian Cup

Champions: 1956, 1960
Runners-up: 1972, 1980, 1988, 2015
Third place: 1964, 2000, 2007, 2011

- Asian Games

Gold medalists: 1970, 1978, 1986
Silver medalists: 1954, 1958, 1962
Bronze medalists: 1990

=== Regional ===
- EAFF Championship

Champions: 2003, 2008, 2015, 2017, 2019
Runners-up: 2010, 2022, 2025
Third place: 2013

=== Friendly competitions ===
- Korea Cup: 1971, 1974, 1975, 1976, 1978, 1980, 1981, 1982, 1985, 1987, 1991, 1997
- Merdeka Tournament: 1960, 1965, 1967, 1970, 1972, 1975, 1977, 1978
- King's Cup: 1969, 1970, 1971, 1973, 1974, 1975, 1998
- Jakarta Anniversary Tournament: 1981
- Dynasty Cup: 1990
- LG Cup: 2000 (Iran), 2001 (Egypt), 2006 (Saudi Arabia)

=== Awards ===
- FIFA World Cup Most Entertaining Team: 2002
- AFC National Team of the Year: 2002, 2009
- EAFF Championship Fair Play Award: 2008
- AFC Asian Cup Fair Play Award: 2011

== See also ==
- Football in South Korea
- South Korea national under-20 football team
- South Korea national under-17 football team

Achievements
Preceded by Inaugural champions	Asian Champions; 1956 (first title); 1960 (second title)	Succeeded by 1964 Israel
Preceded by 1966 Burma	Asian Games Champions; 1970 (first title)	Succeeded by 1974 Iran
Preceded by 1974 Iran	Asian Games Champions; 1978 (second title)	Succeeded by 1982 Iraq
Preceded by 1982 Iraq	Asian Games Champions; 1986 (third title)	Succeeded by 1990 Iran
Preceded by 1985 Cameroon	Afro-Asian Cup Champions; 1988 (first title)	Succeeded by 1991 Algeria
Preceded by Inaugural champions	EAFF Champions; 2003 (first title)	Succeeded by 2005 China
Preceded by 2005 China	EAFF Champions; 2008 (second title)	Succeeded by 2010 China
Preceded by 2013 Japan	EAFF Champions; 2015 (third title); 2017 (fourth title); 2019 (fifth title)	Succeeded by 2022 Japan
Awards
Preceded by China	AFC Men's Team of the Year; 2002	Succeeded by Iraq
Preceded by Japan	AFC Men's Team of the Year; 2009	Succeeded by Japan
