= Korea national football team =

Korea national football team may refer to:

- North Korea national football team, the men's association football team representing North Korea
  - North Korea women's national football team, the women's association football team representing North Korea
- South Korea national football team, the men's association football team representing South Korea
  - South Korea women's national football team, the women's association football team representing South Korea
- Korea Unified football team, unified association football team of players from both North Korea and South Korea at the 1991 FIFA World Youth Championship
- South Korea national American football team, the American football team representing South Korea

== See also ==
- History of the South Korea national football team, for teams that represented Korea during the period of Japanese rule (1910–1945)
