= South Korea at the AFC Asian Cup =

National football delegation

The South Korea national football team have appeared 15 times at the Asian Cup. They have failed to qualify for the finals on three occasions, in 1968, 1976 and 1992. South Korea won the inaugural edition of the tournament in 1956, held in Hong Kong, and successfully defended the title on home soil in 1960. In addition, the team finished as runners-up on four occasions.

== Competitive record ==
AFC Asian Cup record									Qualification record					
Year	Round	Pld	W	D	L	GF	GA	Squad	Pld	W	D	L	GF	GA
(British Hong Kong) 1956	Champions	3	2	1	0	9	6	Squad	4	4	0	0	9	1
(South Korea) 1960	Champions	3	3	0	0	9	1	Squad	Qualified as hosts					
(Israel) 1964	Third place	3 (Note: South Korea played with their "B" team.)	1	0	2	2	4	Squad	Direct entry					
(Pahlavi Iran) 1968	Did not qualify								4	1	1	2	9	4
1972	Runners-up	5	1	2	2	7	6	Squad	Direct entry					
(Pahlavi Iran) 1976	Did not qualify								4	2	0	2	3	3
(Kuwait) 1980	Runners-up	6	4	1	1	12	6	Squad	3	3	0	0	10	1
(Singapore) 1984	Group stage	4	0	2	2	1	3	Squad	4	3	1	0	13	0
(Qatar) 1988	Runners-up	6	5	1	0	11	3	Squad	3	1	1	1	5	3
(Japan) 1992	Did not qualify								2	1	0	1	7	2
(United Arab Emirates) 1996	Quarter-finals	4	1	1	2	7	11	Squad	3	3	0	0	17	0
(Lebanon) 2000	Third place	6	3	1	2	9	6	Squad	3	3	0	0	19	0
(China) 2004	Quarter-finals	4	2	1	1	9	4	Squad	6	4	0	2	30	4
(Indonesia) (Malaysia) (Vietnam) 2007	Third place	6	1	4	1	3	3	Squad	6	3	2	1	15	5
(Qatar) 2011	Third place	6	4	2	0	13	7	Squad	Directly qualified					
(Australia) 2015	Runners-up	6	5	0	1	8	2	Squad	Directly qualified					
(United Arab Emirates) 2019	Quarter-finals	5	4	0	1	6	2	Squad	8	8	0	0	27	0
(Qatar) 2023	Semi-finals	6	2	3	1	11	10	Squad	6	5	1	0	22	1
(Saudi Arabia) 2027	Qualified								6	5	1	0	20	1
Total	Champions	73	38	19	16	117	74	16/19	62	46	7	9	206	25

== Head-to-head record ==
Opponent	Pld	W	D	L	GF	GA	GD
Australia	4	2	1	1	5	4	+1
Bahrain	4	3	0	1	8	5	+3
China	4	3	1	0	7	3	+4
Chinese Taipei	1	1	0	0	1	0	+1
Hong Kong	2	1	1	0	3	2	+1
India	2	1	0	1	4	3	+1
Indonesia	3	3	0	0	8	2	+6
Iran	7	3	1	3	12	13	–1
Iraq	3	1	2	0	2	0	+2
Israel	3	2	0	1	6	3	+3
Japan	3	1	2	0	4	2	+2
Jordan	3	0	2	1	2	4	–2
Khmer Republic	1	1	0	0	4	1	+3
Kuwait	8	3	1	4	9	8	+1
Kyrgyzstan	1	1	0	0	1	0	+1
Malaysia	2	0	2	0	4	4	0
North Korea	1	1	0	0	2	1	+1
Oman	1	1	0	0	1	0	+1
Philippines	1	1	0	0	1	0	+1
Qatar	4	2	0	2	5	4	+1
Saudi Arabia	5	0	4	1	4	5	–1
South Vietnam	2	2	0	0	10	4	+6
Syria	1	0	0	1	0	1	–1
Thailand	1	0	1	0	1	1	0
United Arab Emirates	4	3	1	0	8	2	+6
Uzbekistan	2	2	0	0	5	2	+3

== Details ==
=== 1956 (Hong Kong) ===
South Korea finished top at a round-robin tournament featuring four countries, becoming the inaugural champions of the AFC Asian Cup. South Korea had unfavorable schedule that required them to meet their largest rivals Israel two days after playing their first match, but defeated Israel, whose schedule had allowed them to rest for seven days.

6 September	South Korea	2–2	Hong Kong	Government Stadium, Hong Kong
19:00	Kim Ji-sung 45'; Choi Kwang-seok 62'		Tang Yee Kit 10'; Ko Po Keung 39'	Attendance: 30,000

8 September	Israel	1–2	South Korea	Government Stadium, Hong Kong
19:00	Stelmach 71'		Woo Sang-kwon 52'; Sung Nak-woon 64'	Attendance: 20,000; Referee: Trương Văn Ky (South Vietnam)

15 September	South Korea	5–3	South Vietnam	Government Stadium, Hong Kong
19:00	Sung Nak-woon 5'; Woo Sang-kwon 41' (pen.), 58'; Choi Chung-min 57', 66'		Trải Văn Đào 20'; Lê Hữu Đức 51', 63'

Final table
Pos	Team	Pld	W	D	L	GF	GA	GD	Pts
1	South Korea (C)	3	2	1	0	9	6	+3	5
2	Israel	3	2	0	1	6	5	+1	4
3	Hong Kong (H)	3	0	2	1	6	7	−1	2
4	South Vietnam	3	0	1	2	6	9	−3	1

Source: RSSSF
(C) Champions; (H) Hosts

=== 1960 (South Korea) ===
South Korea won their second consecutive title, and South Korean forward Cho Yoon-ok became the top goalscorer of the competition with four goals. However, South Korean players received fake medals, and returned the medals to Korean FA. The KFA gave real medals to their families in 2019.

14 October	South Korea	5–1	South Vietnam	Hyochang Stadium, Seoul
15:15	Cho Yoon-ok 15', 71'; Woo Sang-kwon 27'; Choi Chung-min 47'; Moon Jung-sik 56'		Nguyễn Văn Tu 70'	Attendance: 30,000

17 October	South Korea	3–0	Israel	Hyochang Stadium, Seoul
15:00	Cho Yoon-ok 17', 60'; Woo Sang-kwon 30'			Attendance: 30,000; Referee: Yozo Yokoyama (Japan)

21 October	South Korea	1–0	Taiwan	Hyochang Stadium, Seoul
15:00	Moon Jung-sik 54'

Final table
Pos	Team	Pld	W	D	L	GF	GA	GD	Pts
1	South Korea (C, H)	3	3	0	0	9	1	+8	6
2	Israel	3	2	0	1	6	4	+2	4
3	Taiwan	3	1	0	2	2	2	0	2
4	South Vietnam	3	0	0	3	2	12	−10	0

Source: RSSSF
(C) Champions; (H) Hosts

=== 1964 (Israel) ===
The 1964 AFC Asian Cup was held when South Korea had to play an Olympic qualifier against South Vietnam. The Korean FA sent their reserve team to the Asian Cup.

27 May	South Korea	0–2	India	Municipal Stadium, Haifa
16:30			Appalaraju 2'; I. Singh 57'	Attendance: 7,000; Referee: Davoud Nassiri (Iran)

31 May	South Korea	1–0	Hong Kong	Hebrew University Stadium, Jerusalem
16:30	Bae Keum-soo 74'			Attendance: 7,000; Referee: Pisit Ngarampanich (Thailand)

3 June	South Korea	1–2	Israel	Ramat Gan Stadium, Ramat Gan
16:00	Huh Yoon-jung 79'		Leon 20'; Tish 38'	Attendance: 35,000; Referee: Davoud Nassiri (Iran)

Final table
Pos	Team	Pld	W	D	L	GF	GA	GD	Pts
1	Israel (C, H)	3	3	0	0	5	1	+4	6
2	India	3	2	0	1	5	3	+2	4
3	South Korea	3	1	0	2	2	4	−2	2
4	Hong Kong	3	0	0	3	1	5	−4	0

Source: RSSSF
(C) Champions; (H) Hosts

=== 1972 (Thailand) ===
7 May Group allocation match	South Korea	0–0 (2–4 p)	Iraq	National Stadium, Bangkok
	Penalties
			(penalty scored) Aziz; (penalty scored) Nouri; (penalty scored) Kadhim; (penalty scored) Fathi

10 May Group B	South Korea	4–1	Khmer Republic	National Stadium, Bangkok
	Park Su-deok 37'; Lee Hoe-taik 60'; Cha Bum-kun 72'; Park Lee-chun 78' (pen.)		Doeur 82'

12 May Group B	South Korea	1–2	Kuwait	National Stadium, Bangkok
	Park Lee-chun 2' (pen.)		Al-Asfoor 24'; Duraiham 74'

Group B table
Pos	Team	Pld	W	D	L	GF	GA	GD	Pts	Qualification
1	South Korea	2	1	0	1	5	3	+2	2	Advance to knockout stage
2	Khmer Republic	2	1	0	1	5	4	+1	2	Advance to knockout stage
3	Kuwait	2	1	0	1	2	5	−3	2	

Source: RSSSF

17 May Semi-finals	South Korea	1–1 (a.e.t.) (2–1 p)	Thailand	National Stadium, Bangkok
	Park Lee-chun 113'		Niwatana 97'

19 May Final	Iran	2–1 (a.e.t.)	South Korea	National Stadium, Bangkok
	Jabbari 49'; Kalani 108'		Park Lee-chun 65'	Attendance: 15,000; Referee: Sivapalan Kathiravale (Malaysia)

=== 1980 (Kuwait) ===
South Korea won all matches from the second matchday to the semi-finals, including the match against hosts Kuwait. However, nine South Korean players were not in optimal condition after suffering injuries in the semi-final against North Korea, and they lost in the final where they met Kuwait again. 18-year-old striker Choi Soon-ho became the youngest top scorer in Asian Cup history.

16 September Group B	Malaysia	1–1	South Korea	Sabah Al-Salem Stadium, Kuwait City
18:30	Abdul Ali 90'		Choi Soon-ho 68'	Attendance: 5,000

19 September Group B	Qatar	0–2	South Korea	Sabah Al-Salem Stadium, Kuwait City
18:30			Lee Jung-il 4'; Choi Soon-ho 21'

21 September Group B	South Korea	3–0	Kuwait	Sabah Al-Salem Stadium, Kuwait City
16:30	Hwang Seok-keun 47'; Choi Soon-ho 71', 78'			Attendance: 15,000

24 September Group B	South Korea	4–1	United Arab Emirates	Sabah Al-Salem Stadium, Kuwait City
18:30	Choi Soon-ho 26', 53', 78' (pen.); Chung Hae-won 84'		Chombi 79'

Group B table
Pos	Team	Pld	W	D	L	GF	GA	GD	Pts	Qualification
1	South Korea	4	3	1	0	10	2	+8	7	Advance to knockout stage
2	Kuwait (H)	4	2	1	1	8	5	+3	5	Advance to knockout stage
3	Malaysia	4	1	2	1	5	5	0	4	
4	Qatar	4	1	1	2	3	8	−5	3	
5	United Arab Emirates	4	0	1	3	3	9	−6	1	

Source: RSSSF
(H) Hosts

28 September Semi-finals	South Korea	2–1	North Korea	Sabah Al-Salem Stadium, Kuwait City
19:30	Chung Hae-won 80', 89'		Park Jong-hon 19' (pen.)

30 September Final	Kuwait	3–0	South Korea	Sabah Al-Salem Stadium, Kuwait City
18:30	Al-Houti 7'; Al-Dakhil 30', 67'			Attendance: 25,000

=== 1984 (Singapore) ===
The year 1984 is regarded as one of the worst years in South Korean football. After failing to qualify for the football tournament of the 1984 Summer Olympics, South Korea once again faced shocking results without a victory at the 1984 AFC Asian Cup. They scored only one goal while attempting 53 shots.

2 December Group A	South Korea	1–1	Saudi Arabia	National Stadium, Singapore
19:00	Lee Tae-ho 51'		Abdullah 90'

5 December Group A	Kuwait	0–0	South Korea	National Stadium, Singapore
19:00

7 December Group A	South Korea	0–1	Syria	National Stadium, Singapore
21:00			Hassan 13'

10 December Group A	Qatar	1–0	South Korea	National Stadium, Singapore
21:00	Salman 69'

Group A table
Pos	Team	Pld	W	D	L	GF	GA	GD	Pts	Qualification
1	Saudi Arabia	4	2	2	0	4	2	+2	6	Advance to knockout stage
2	Kuwait	4	2	1	1	4	2	+2	5	Advance to knockout stage
3	Qatar	4	1	2	1	3	3	0	4	
4	Syria	4	1	1	2	3	5	−2	3	
5	South Korea	4	0	2	2	1	3	−2	2	

Source: RSSSF

=== 1988 (Qatar) ===
South Korea got a chance to win their third title again after winning all matches until the semi-finals, but they lost the final to Saudi Arabia after a penalty shoot-out. This was the third time they had finished runners-up at the Asian Cup. Their new star player Kim Joo-sung was named the Most Valuable Player.

3 December Group A	United Arab Emirates	0–1	South Korea	Al-Ahly Stadium, Doha
15:00		Report	Lee Tae-ho 8' (pen.)	Referee: George Courtney (England)

6 December Group A	South Korea	2–0	Japan	Qatar SC Stadium, Doha
15:00	Hwang Sun-hong 13'; Kim Joo-sung 35'	Report		Referee: Salah Mohammed (Iraq)

9 December Group A	Qatar	2–3	South Korea	Qatar SC Stadium, Doha
17:00	Salman 47' (pen.), 80' (pen.)	Report	Chung Hae-won 10', 72'; Kim Joo-sung 34'	Referee: George Courtney (England)

11 December Group A	South Korea	3–0	Iran	Al-Ahly Stadium, Doha
17:00	Byun Byung-joo 26', 57'; Hwang Sun-hong 42'	Report		Attendance: 5,000; Referee: Neji Jouini (Tunisia)

Group A table
Pos	Team	Pld	W	D	L	GF	GA	GD	Pts	Qualification
1	South Korea	4	4	0	0	9	2	+7	8	Advance to knockout stage
2	Iran	4	2	1	1	3	3	0	5	Advance to knockout stage
3	Qatar (H)	4	2	0	2	7	6	+1	4	
4	United Arab Emirates	4	1	0	3	2	4	−2	2	
5	Japan	4	0	1	3	0	6	−6	1	

Source: RSSSF
(H) Hosts

14 December Semi-finals	South Korea	2–1 (a.e.t.)	China	Qatar SC Stadium, Doha
16:00	Lee Tae-ho 93', 103'	Report	Mai Chao 100'	Attendance: 1,000; Referee: Vincent Mauro (United States)

18 December Final	South Korea	0–0 (a.e.t.) (3–4 p)	Saudi Arabia	Al-Ahly Stadium, Doha
16:00		Report		Attendance: 20,000; Referee: Michel Vautrot (France)
	Penalties
	Cho Min-kook (penalty missed); Lee Tae-ho (penalty scored); Byun Byung-joo (penalty scored); Kim Joo-sung (penalty scored); Cho Yoon-hwan (penalty missed)		(penalty scored) Al-Naima; (penalty missed) Al-Jawad; (penalty scored) Abdullah; (penalty scored) Al-Mutlaq; (penalty scored) Al-Bishi

=== 1996 (United Arab Emirates) ===
Before the 1996 tournament, the Korean FA appointed Park Jong-hwan as the new manager. Park was evaluated as the greatest South Korean manager at the time by leading Ilhwa Chunma to win three consecutive K League titles. Contrary to expectations, South Korea finished third in their group stage, showing a shaky start. In a quarter-final match against Iran, South Korea held a 2–1 lead until half-time, but they conceded five goals during the second half including Ali Daei's four goals. After the disaster, Park resigned from the team, and defender Hong Myung-bo was suspected of slowdown.

4 December Group A	United Arab Emirates	1–1	South Korea	Sheikh Zayed Stadium, Abu Dhabi
16:45	K. Saad 40'	Report	Hwang Sun-hong 9'	Attendance: 35,000; Referee: Pirom Un-Prasert (Thailand)

7 December Group A	South Korea	4-2	Indonesia	Sheikh Zayed Stadium, Abu Dhabi
19:00	Kim Do-hoon 5'; Hwang Sun-hong 7', 15'; Ko Jeong-woon 55'	Report	Wabia 58'; Putro 65'	Attendance: 2,000; Referee: Shamsul Maidin (Singapore)

10 December Group A	Kuwait	2–0	South Korea	Sheikh Zayed Stadium, Abu Dhabi
19:00	Al-Huwaidi 60'; Bashar Abdullah 87'	Report		Attendance: 3,000; Referee: Mohd Nazri Abdullah (Malaysia)

Group A table
Pos	Team	Pld	W	D	L	GF	GA	GD	Pts	Qualification
1	United Arab Emirates (H)	3	2	1	0	6	3	+3	7	Advance to knockout stage
2	Kuwait	3	1	1	1	6	5	+1	4	Advance to knockout stage
3	South Korea	3	1	1	1	5	5	0	4	Advance to knockout stage
4	Indonesia	3	0	1	2	4	8	−4	1	

Source: RSSSF
(H) Hosts

16 December Quarter-finals	South Korea	2–6	Iran	Al-Maktoum Stadium, Dubai
16:45	Kim Do-hoon 11'; Shin Tae-yong 35'	Report	Bagheri 31'; Azizi 52'; Daei 66', 76', 83', 89' (pen.)	Attendance: 19,000; Referee: Jamal Al Sharif (Syria)

=== 2000 (Lebanon) ===
13 October Group B	South Korea	2–2	China	International Olympic Stadium, Tripoli
17:05	Lee Young-pyo 30'; Noh Jung-yoon 58'	Report	Su Maozhen 36'; Fan Zhiyi 66' (pen.)	Attendance: 1,000; Referee: Omer Al-Mehannah (Saudi Arabia)

16 October Group B	South Korea	0–1	Kuwait	International Olympic Stadium, Tripoli
19:45		Report	Al-Huwaidi 43'	Attendance: 5,000; Referee: Brian Hall (United States)

19 October Group B	South Korea	3–0	Indonesia	Sports City Stadium, Beirut
19:35	Lee Dong-gook 30', 76', 90+1'	Report		Attendance: 500; Referee: Toru Kamikawa (Japan)

Group B table
Pos	Team	Pld	W	D	L	GF	GA	GD	Pts	Qualification
1	China	3	1	2	0	6	2	+4	5	Advance to knockout stage
2	Kuwait	3	1	2	0	1	0	+1	5	Advance to knockout stage
3	South Korea	3	1	1	1	5	3	+2	4	Advance to knockout stage
4	Indonesia	3	0	1	2	0	7	−7	1	

Source: RSSSF

23 October Quarter-finals	Iran	1–2 (a.e.t.)	South Korea	International Olympic Stadium, Tripoli
16:45	Bagheri 71'	Report	Kim Sang-sik 90'; Lee Dong-gook 99'	Attendance: 5,000; Referee: Ali Bujsaim (UAE)

26 October Semi-finals	South Korea	1–2	Saudi Arabia	Sports City Stadium, Beirut
16:45	Lee Dong-gook 90+1'	Report	Al-Meshal 76', 80'	Attendance: 7,000; Referee: Saad Kamil Al-Fadhli (Kuwait)

29 October Third place match	South Korea	1–0	China	Sports City Stadium, Beirut
17:05	Lee Dong-gook 76'	Report		Attendance: 20,000; Referee: Nabil Ayad (Lebanon)

=== 2004 (China) ===
Despite finishing fourth at the 2002 FIFA World Cup, South Korea was not able to dominate Asia after Guus Hiddink left them. They suffered shock defeats in the qualifiers against Oman and Vietnam. In a 4–3 quarter-final defeat to Iran, they conceded Ali Karimi's hat-trick and scored an own goal.

19 July Group B	South Korea	0–0	Jordan	Shandong Sports Center, Jinan
18:30		Report		Attendance: 26,000; Referee: Shamsul Maidin (Singapore)

23 July Group B	United Arab Emirates	0–2	South Korea	Shandong Sports Center, Jinan
21:00		Report	Lee Dong-gook 41'; Ahn Jung-hwan 90+1'	Attendance: 30,000; Referee: Ravshan Irmatov (Uzbekistan)

27 July Group B	South Korea	4–0	Kuwait	Shandong Sports Center, Jinan
19:00	Lee Dong-gook 25', 41'; Cha Du-ri 45+1'; Ahn Jung-hwan 75'	Report		Attendance: 15,000; Referee: Shamsul Maidin (Singapore)

Group B table
Pos	Team	Pld	W	D	L	GF	GA	GD	Pts	Qualification
1	South Korea	3	2	1	0	6	0	+6	7	Advance to knockout stage
2	Jordan	3	1	2	0	2	0	+2	5	Advance to knockout stage
3	Kuwait	3	1	0	2	3	7	−4	3	
4	United Arab Emirates	3	0	1	2	1	5	−4	1	

Source: RSSSF

31 July Quarter-finals	South Korea	3–4	Iran	Shandong Sports Center, Jinan
21:00	Seol Ki-hyeon 16'; Lee Dong-gook 25'; Kim Nam-il 68'	Report	Karimi 10', 20', 77'; Park Jin-seop 51' (o.g.)	Attendance: 20,000; Referee: Saad Kamil Al-Fadhli (Kuwait)

=== 2007 (Indonesia, Malaysia, Thailand and Vietnam) ===
After excluding three Premier League players (Park Ji-sung, Lee Young-pyo and Seol Ki-hyeon) due to their injuries, South Korea had difficulty again at the Asian Cup. Furthermore, some players including captain Lee Woon-jae were criticised by fans for visiting a hostess bar in the middle of the group stage. South Korea's outfield players made only three goals until the end of the competition. During their lack of offensive capability, Lee, the captain and goalkeeper, led his team to a third-place finish by keeping four clean sheets and winning two penalty shoot-outs.

11 July Group D	South Korea	1–1	Saudi Arabia	Gelora Bung Karno Stadium, Jakarta
19:35 UTC+7	Choi Sung-kuk 66'	Report	Y. Al-Qahtani 77' (pen.)	Attendance: 15,000; Referee: Mark Shield (Australia)

15 July Group D	Bahrain	2–1	South Korea	Gelora Bung Karno Stadium, Jakarta
19:35 UTC+7	Isa 43'; Abdullatif 85'	Report	Kim Do-heon 4'	Attendance: 9,000; Referee: Sun Baojie (China)

18 July Group D	Indonesia	0–1	South Korea	Gelora Bung Karno Stadium, Jakarta
17:20 UTC+7		Report	Kim Jung-woo 34'	Attendance: 88,000; Referee: Mark Shield (Australia)

Group D table
Pos	Team	Pld	W	D	L	GF	GA	GD	Pts	Qualification
1	Saudi Arabia	3	2	1	0	7	2	+5	7	Advance to knockout stage
2	South Korea	3	1	1	1	3	3	0	4	Advance to knockout stage
3	Indonesia (H)	3	1	0	2	3	4	−1	3	
4	Bahrain	3	1	0	2	3	7	−4	3	

Source: AFC
Rules for classification: Group stage tiebreakers
(H) Hosts

22 July Quarter-finals	Iran	0–0 (a.e.t.) (2–4 p)	South Korea	Bukit Jalil Stadium, Kuala Lumpur
18:20 UTC+8		Report		Attendance: 8,629; Referee: Ali Hamad Al-Badwawi (UAE)
	Penalties
	Zandi (penalty scored); Mahdavikia (penalty missed); Enayati (penalty scored); Khatibi (penalty missed)		(penalty scored) Lee Chun-soo; (penalty scored) Kim Sang-sik; (penalty missed) Kim Do-heon; (penalty scored) Cho Jae-jin; (penalty scored) Kim Jung-woo

25 July Semi-finals	Iraq	0–0 (a.e.t.) (4–3 p)	South Korea	Bukit Jalil Stadium, Kuala Lumpur
18:20 UTC+8		Report		Attendance: 12,500; Referee: Saad Kamil Al-Fadhli (Kuwait)
	Penalties
	Mohammed (penalty scored); Munir (penalty scored); Abdul-Amir (penalty scored); Mnajed (penalty scored)		(penalty scored) Lee Chun-soo; (penalty scored) Lee Dong-gook; (penalty scored) Cho Jae-jin; (penalty missed) Yeom Ki-hun; (penalty missed) Kim Jung-woo

28 July Third place match	South Korea	0–0 (a.e.t.) (6–5 p)	Japan	Jakabaring Stadium, Palembang
19:35 UTC+8		Report		Attendance: 10,000; Referee: Ali Hamad Al-Badwawi (UAE)
	Penalties
	Cho Jae-jin (penalty scored); Oh Beom-seok (penalty scored); Lee Chun-soo (penalty scored); Lee Ho (penalty scored); Kim Jin-kyu (penalty scored); Kim Chi-woo (penalty scored)		(penalty scored) S. Nakamura; (penalty scored) Endo; (penalty scored) Abe; (penalty scored) Komano; (penalty scored) Nakazawa; (penalty missed) Hanyu

=== 2011 (Qatar) ===
After beating Iran in extra time of a quarter-final match, South Korea once again played extra time in the semi-finals against Japan. In this extra time, Hajime Hosogai, who moved into the penalty area before his teammate Keisuke Honda missed a penalty, got a rebound and scored a controversial goal for Japan. South Korea scored an equaliser after the misfortune, but lost on penalties.

10 January Group C	South Korea	2–1	Bahrain	Al Gharafa Stadium, Doha
19:15	Koo Ja-cheol 40', 52'	Report	Aaish 85' (pen.)	Attendance: 6,669; Referee: Abdullah Al Hilali (Oman)

14 January Group C	Australia	1–1	South Korea	Al Gharafa Stadium, Doha
16:15	Jedinak 62'	Report	Koo Ja-cheol 24'	Attendance: 15,526; Referee: Abdulrahman Abdou (Qatar)

18 January Group C	South Korea	4–1	India	Al Gharafa Stadium, Doha
16:15	Ji Dong-won 6', 23'; Koo Ja-cheol 9'; Son Heung-min 81'	Report	Chhetri 12' (pen.)	Attendance: 11,366; Referee: Khalil Al Ghamdi (Saudi Arabia)

Group C table
Pos	Team	Pld	W	D	L	GF	GA	GD	Pts	Qualification
1	Australia	3	2	1	0	6	1	+5	7	Advance to knockout stage
2	South Korea	3	2	1	0	7	3	+4	7	Advance to knockout stage
3	Bahrain	3	1	0	2	6	5	+1	3	
4	India	3	0	0	3	3	13	−10	0	

Source: AFC
Rules for classification: Group stage tiebreakers

22 January Quarter-finals	Iran	0–1 (a.e.t.)	South Korea	Qatar SC Stadium, Doha
19:25		Report	Yoon Bit-garam 105'	Attendance: 7,111; Referee: Ravshan Irmatov (Uzbekistan)

25 January Semi-finals	Japan	2–2 (a.e.t.) (3–0 p)	South Korea	Al-Gharafa Stadium, Doha
16:25	Maeda 36'; Hosogai 97'	Report	Ki Sung-yueng 23' (pen.); Hwang Jae-won 120'	Attendance: 16,171; Referee: Khalil Al Ghamdi (Saudi Arabia)
	Penalties
	K. Honda (penalty scored); Okazaki (penalty scored); Nagatomo (penalty missed); Konno (penalty scored)		(penalty missed) Koo Ja-cheol; (penalty missed) Lee Yong-rae; (penalty missed) Hong Jeong-ho

28 January Third place match	Uzbekistan	2–3	South Korea	Jassim Bin Hamad Stadium, Doha
18:00	Geynrikh 45' (pen.), 53'	Report	Koo Ja-cheol 18'; Ji Dong-won 28', 39'	Attendance: 8,199; Referee: Abdul Malik Bashir (Singapore)

=== 2015 (Australia) ===
Under the leadership of manager Uli Stielike, the South Korean players underperformed in the first two matches against Oman and Kuwait. They won both matches, but expressed dissatisfaction with Stielike, who then handed over command to assistant manager Shin Tae-yong for the rest of the tournament. Goalkeeper Kim Jin-hyeon then kept a clean sheet in every match until the final, as the team eliminated Uzbekistan and Iraq in the quarter-finals and semi-finals, respectively. Their opponent in the final was Australia, which they had already beaten 1–0 in the group stage. However, South Korea lost the final 2–1 after extra time, evoking the 1980 final between them and Kuwait.

10 January Group A	South Korea	1–0	Oman	Canberra Stadium, Canberra
16:00 UTC+11	Cho Young-cheol 45+2'	Report		Attendance: 12,552; Referee: Peter O'Leary (New Zealand)

13 January Group A	Kuwait	0–1	South Korea	Canberra Stadium, Canberra
18:00 UTC+11		Report	Nam Tae-hee 36'	Attendance: 8,795; Referee: Alireza Faghani (Iran)

17 January Group A	Australia	0–1	South Korea	Suncorp Stadium, Brisbane
20:00 UTC+11		Report	Lee Jeong-hyeop 32'	Attendance: 48,513; Referee: Nawaf Shukralla (Bahrain)

Group A table
Pos	Team	Pld	W	D	L	GF	GA	GD	Pts	Qualification
1	South Korea	3	3	0	0	3	0	+3	9	Advance to knockout stage
2	Australia (H)	3	2	0	1	8	2	+6	6	Advance to knockout stage
3	Oman	3	1	0	2	1	5	−4	3	
4	Kuwait	3	0	0	3	1	6	−5	0	

Source: AFC
Rules for classification: Group stage tiebreakers
(H) Hosts

22 January Quarter-finals	South Korea	2–0 (a.e.t.)	Uzbekistan	Melbourne Rectangular Stadium, Melbourne
18:30 UTC+11	Son Heung-min 104', 119'	Report		Attendance: 23,381; Referee: Fahad Al-Mirdasi (Saudi Arabia)

26 January Semi-finals	South Korea	2–0	Iraq	Stadium Australia, Sydney
20:00 UTC+11	Lee Jeong-hyeop 20'; Kim Young-gwon 50'	Report		Attendance: 36,053; Referee: Ryuji Sato (Japan)

31 January Final	South Korea	1–2 (a.e.t.)	Australia	Stadium Australia, Sydney
20:00 UTC+11	Son Heung-min 90+1'	Report	Luongo 45'; Troisi 105'	Attendance: 76,385; Referee: Alireza Faghani (Iran)

=== 2019 (United Arab Emirates) ===
7 January Group C	South Korea	1–0	Philippines	Al Maktoum Stadium, Dubai
17:30	Hwang Ui-jo 67'	Report		Attendance: 3,185; Referee: Nawaf Shukralla (Bahrain)

11 January Group C	Kyrgyzstan	0–1	South Korea	Hazza bin Zayed Stadium, Al Ain
20:00		Report	Kim Min-jae 41'	Attendance: 4,893; Referee: Khamis Al-Marri (Qatar)

16 January Group C	South Korea	2–0	China	Al Nahyan Stadium, Abu Dhabi
17:30	Hwang Ui-jo 14' (pen.); Kim Min-jae 51'	Report		Attendance: 13,579; Referee: Abdulrahman Al-Jassim (Qatar)

Group C table
Pos	Team	Pld	W	D	L	GF	GA	GD	Pts	Qualification
1	South Korea	3	3	0	0	4	0	+4	9	Advance to knockout stage
2	China	3	2	0	1	5	3	+2	6	Advance to knockout stage
3	Kyrgyzstan	3	1	0	2	4	4	0	3	Advance to knockout stage
4	Philippines	3	0	0	3	1	7	−6	0	

Source: AFC
Rules for classification: Group stage tiebreakers

22 January Round of 16	South Korea	2–1 (a.e.t.)	Bahrain	Rashid Stadium, Dubai
17:00	Hwang Hee-chan 43'; Kim Jin-su 105+2'	Report	Al Romaihi 77'	Attendance: 7,658; Referee: Ryuji Sato (Japan)

25 January Quarter-finals	South Korea	0–1	Qatar	Zayed Sports City Stadium, Abu Dhabi
17:00		Report	Hatem 78'	Attendance: 13,791; Referee: Ravshan Irmatov (Uzbekistan)

=== 2023 (Qatar) ===
After the 2022 FIFA World Cup, Korean FA president Chung Mong-gyu directly appointed Jürgen Klinsmann as national team manager without a general process. Chung's decision created concern among South Korean media, who knew Klinsmann's neglect of duty at Hertha BSC and Philipp Lahm's criticism of Klinsmann's indifference to tactics, and the concern came true. Klinsmann was widely unpopular amongst fans due to him working from his home in the United States rather than relocating to South Korea, alleged lack of interest in K League players, poor results in friendlies, questionable squad line-ups, lazy attitudes, and lack of transparency during the appointment process.

Despite the controversies over the new manager, South Korea were considered among the pre-tournament favourites. After winning their opening match against Bahrain, the team failed to win their remaining two group stage matches after drawing with Jordan and Malaysia, respectively, finishing second in their group and conceding goals in all matches. South Korea narrowly advanced to the semi-finals after knocking out Saudi Arabia on penalties and Australia in extra time, but Klinsmann came under heavy scrutiny over his questionable tactics and work ethic, to which South Korean media dubbed "Zombie football". After South Korea's semi-final loss to Jordan without a shot on target, Klinsmann was fired, and Chung was called to be held responsible for his decision.

15 January 2024 Group E	South Korea	3–1	Bahrain	Jassim bin Hamad Stadium, Al Rayyan
14:30 UTC+3	Hwang In-beom 38'; Lee Kang-in 56', 68'	Report	Al-Hashsash 51'	Attendance: 8,388; Referee: Ma Ning (China)

20 January 2024 Group E	Jordan	2–2	South Korea	Al Thumama Stadium, Doha
14:30 UTC+3	Park Yong-woo 37' (o.g.); Al-Naimat 45+6'	Report	Son Heung-min 9' (pen.); Al-Arab 90+1' (o.g.)	Attendance: 36,627; Referee: Salman Falahi (Qatar)

25 January 2024 Group E	South Korea	3–3	Malaysia	Al Janoub Stadium, Al Wakrah
14:30 UTC+3	Jeong Woo-yeong 21'; Lee Kang-in 83'; Son Heung-min 90+4' (pen.)	Report	Faisal 51'; Arif 62' (pen.); Morales 90+15'	Attendance: 30,117; Referee: Khalid Al-Turais (Saudi Arabia)

Group E table
Pos	Team	Pld	W	D	L	GF	GA	GD	Pts	Qualification
1	Bahrain	3	2	0	1	3	3	0	6	Advance to knockout stage
2	South Korea	3	1	2	0	8	6	+2	5	Advance to knockout stage
3	Jordan	3	1	1	1	6	3	+3	4	Advance to knockout stage
4	Malaysia	3	0	1	2	3	8	−5	1	

Source: AFC
Rules for classification: Group stage tiebreakers

30 January 2024 Round of 16	Saudi Arabia	1–1 (a.e.t.) (2–4 p)	South Korea	Education City Stadium, Al Rayyan
19:00 UTC+3	Radif 46'	Report	Cho Gue-sung 90+9'	Attendance: 42,389; Referee: Ilgiz Tantashev (Uzbekistan)
	Penalties
	Kanno (penalty scored); Abdulhamid (penalty scored); Al-Najei (penalty missed); Ghareeb (penalty missed)		(penalty scored) Son Heung-min; (penalty scored) Kim Young-gwon; (penalty scored) Cho Gue-sung; (penalty scored) Hwang Hee-chan

2 February 2024 Quarter-finals	Australia	1–2 (a.e.t.)	South Korea	Al Janoub Stadium, Al Wakrah
18:30 UTC+3	Goodwin 42'	Report	Hwang Hee-chan 90+6' (pen.); Son Heung-min 104'	Attendance: 39,632; Referee: Ahmed Al-Kaf (Oman)

6 February 2024 Semi-finals	Jordan	2–0	South Korea	Ahmad bin Ali Stadium, Al Rayyan
18:00 UTC+3	Al-Naimat 53'; Al-Taamari 66'	Report		Attendance: 42,850; Referee: Mohammed Abdulla Hassan Mohamed (United Arab Emirates)

=== 2027 (Saudi Arabia) ===
TBD Group E	South Korea	v	Yemen	King Abdullah Sports City Stadium, Jeddah
--:-- UTC+3

TBD Group E	Vietnam	v	South Korea	Kingdom Arena, Riyadh
--:-- UTC+3

TBD Group E	South Korea	v	United Arab Emirates	King Saud University Stadium, Riyadh
--:-- UTC+3

Group E table
Pos	Team	Pld	W	D	L	GF	GA	GD	Pts	Qualification
1	South Korea	0	0	0	0	0	0	0	0	Advance to knockout stage
2	United Arab Emirates	0	0	0	0	0	0	0	0	Advance to knockout stage
3	Vietnam	0	0	0	0	0	0	0	0	Possible knockout stage
4	Yemen	0	0	0	0	0	0	0	0	

First match(es) will be played: January 2027. Source: AFC
Rules for classification: Group stage tiebreakers

== See also ==
- History of the South Korea national football team
- South Korea at the FIFA World Cup
- South Korea at the CONCACAF Gold Cup
