= South Korea at the CONCACAF Gold Cup =

This article is a record of South Korea's results at the CONCACAF Gold Cup. The CONCACAF Gold Cup is North America's major tournament, but nations from other confederations could enter the Gold Cup as invitees in select editions.

South Korea participated in the 2000 and 2002 tournament to prepare for the 2002 FIFA World Cup hosted by them. They and Qatar are the only Asian teams to ever participate in the North American continental championships. In seven matches, South Korea failed to win a single one in regular time, but won fourth place in 2002 after advancing to the knockout stage with only one point to their name and defeating Mexico on penalties in the quarter-finals. Two years prior, they were eliminated after the group stage per coin toss. Canada advanced instead and eventually won the 2000 edition.

== Competitive record ==
CONCACAF Gold Cup record
Year	Result	Pld	W	D	L	GF	GA	Squad
(United States) 2000	Group stage	2	0	2	0	2	2	Squad
(United States) 2002	Fourth place	5	0	2	3	3	7	Squad
Total	Fourth place	7	0	4	3	5	9	2/2

== Head-to-head record ==
Opponent	Pld	W	D	L	GF	GA	GD	Win %
Canada	2	0	1	1	1	2	−1	0.00
Costa Rica	2	0	1	1	3	5	−2	0.00
Cuba	1	0	1	0	0	0	+0	0.00
Mexico	1	0	1	0	0	0	+0	0.00
United States	1	0	0	1	1	2	−1	0.00
Total	7	0	4	3	5	9	−4	0.00

== Player records ==
=== Most appearances ===
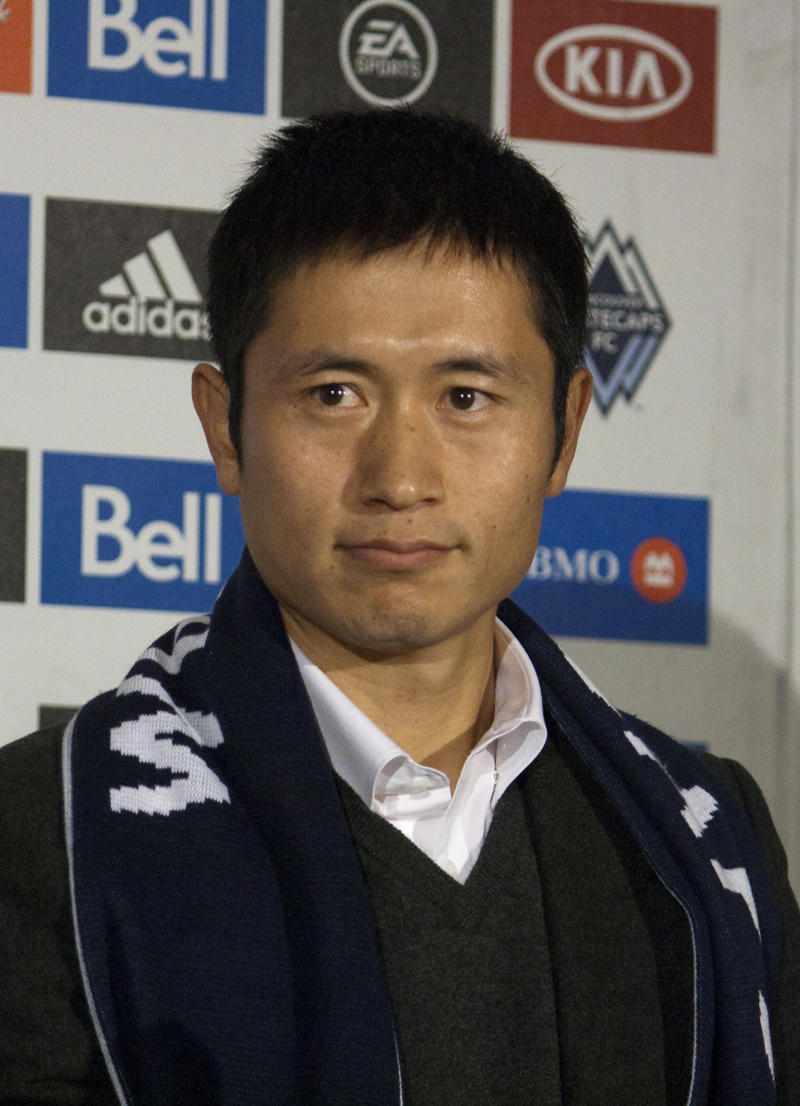
Lee Young-pyo played in all of South Korea's CONCACAF Gold Cup matches in both 2000 and 2002.

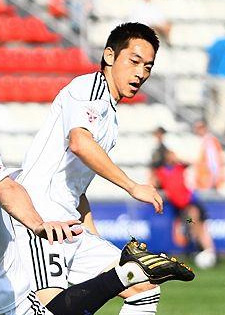
Kim Nam-il was selected for the CONCACAF Gold Cup Best XI in 2002.

Lee Young-pyo is the only player who was fielded in all seven of South Korea's Gold Cup matches. In 2002, Song Chong-gug was the only player to play through the entirety of Korea's fourth-place-run. In the same year, Kim Nam-il was voted into the tournament's Best XI, becoming the first and only Asian player to be honoured at a North American continental championship.

Rank	Player	Caps	Minutes	Competitions
1	Lee Young-pyo	7	588	2000, 2002
2	Kim Tae-young	6	570	2000, 2002
3	Song Chong-gug	5	480	2002
3	Lee Eul-yong	5	370	2002
5	Kim Nam-il	4	383	2002
5	Cha Du-ri	4	372	2002
5	Kim Byung-ji	4	360	2000, 2002
5	Choi Jin-cheul	4	356	2002
5	Yoo Sang-chul	4	330	2000, 2002
5	Kim Do-keun	4	228	2002
5	Lee Dong-gook	4	220	2000, 2002

=== Top goalscorers ===
Five players have scored one goal each at the tournaments. Three of them have been scored against Costa Rica.

Rank	Player	Goals	Caps	Competitions
1	Lee Min-sung	1	1	2000
1	Kim Do-hoon	1	4	2002
1	Choi Jin-cheul	1	4	2002
1	Lee Dong-gook	1	4	2000, 2002
1	Song Chong-gug	1	5	2002

== Details ==
=== 2000 (United States) ===
15 February Group D	South Korea	0–0	Canada	Los Angeles

17 February Group D	South Korea	2–2	Costa Rica	Los Angeles
	Lee Dong-gook 14'; Lee Min-sung 74'		Wanchope 66'; Medford 85'

Group D table
Pos	Team	Pld	W	D	L	GF	GA	GD	Pts	Qualification
1	Costa Rica	2	0	2	0	4	4	0	2	Advance to knockout stage
2	Canada	2	0	2	0	2	2	0	2 (Note: Tied on every statistical record. A coin toss was used as the tiebreaker.)	Advance to knockout stage
3	South Korea	2	0	2	0	2	2	0	2	

Source: ESPN
Rules for classification: Group stage tiebreakers

=== 2002 (United States) ===
19 January Group B	United States	2–1	South Korea	Los Angeles
	Donovan 33'; Beasley 90+3'		Song Chong-gug 37'

23 January Group B	South Korea	0–0	Cuba	San Francisco

Group B table
Pos	Team	Pld	W	D	L	GF	GA	GD	Pts	Qualification
1	United States	2	2	0	0	3	1	+2	6	Advance to knockout stage
2	South Korea	2	0	1	1	1	2	−1	1	Advance to knockout stage
3	Cuba	2	0	1	1	0	1	−1	1	

Source: CONCACAF

27 January Quarter-finals	South Korea	0–0 (a.e.t.) (4–2 p)	Mexico	Los Angeles
	Penalties
	Lee Eul-yong (penalty scored); Lee Dong-gook (penalty scored); Choi Sung-yong (penalty scored); Lee Young-pyo (penalty scored)		(penalty scored) Noriega; (penalty scored) De Anda; (penalty missed) Sosa; (penalty missed) Hierro

30 January Semi-finals	South Korea	1–3	Costa Rica	Anaheim
	Choi Jin-cheul 80'		Gómez 43'; Wanchope 76', 81'

2 February Third place match	South Korea	1–2	Canada	San Diego
	Kim Do-hoon 15'		Kim Do-hoon 33' (o.g.); De Rosario 34'

== See also ==
- History of the South Korea national football team
- South Korea at the FIFA World Cup
- South Korea at the AFC Asian Cup
