= South Korea at the FIFA World Cup =

International football delegation

The South Korea national football team have appeared twelve times at the FIFA World Cup, including eleven consecutive tournaments from 1986 to 2026. The team made its World Cup debut in 1954, losing both matches and finishing fourth in the group stage. South Korea's best ever result is fourth place at the 2002 tournament, co-hosted by South Korea and Japan. At the tournament, South Korea eliminated Italy and Spain in the round of 16 and quarter-finals, respectively, and thus became the first team outside Europe and the Americas to reach the semi-finals.

== Competitive record ==
| FIFA World Cup record | | | | | | | | | Qualification record | | | | | |
| Year | Round | Pld | W | D | L | GF | GA | Squad | Pld | W | D | L | GF | GA |
|---|---|---|---|---|---|---|---|---|---|---|---|---|---|---|
| 1930 to 1938 | Part of Japan | | | | | | | | Part of Japan | | | | | |
| (Brazil) 1950 | Did not enter | | | | | | | | Did not enter | | | | | |
| (Switzerland) 1954 | Group stage | 2 | 0 | 0 | 2 | 0 | 16 | Squad | 2 | 1 | 1 | 0 | 7 | 3 |
| (Sweden) 1958 | Did not enter | | | | | | | | Entry denied by FIFA | | | | | |
| (Chile) 1962 | Did not qualify | | | | | | | | 4 | 2 | 0 | 2 | 6 | 9 |
| (England) 1966 | Did not enter | | | | | | | | Did not enter | | | | | |
| (Mexico) 1970 | Did not qualify | | | | | | | | 4 | 1 | 2 | 1 | 6 | 5 |
| (West Germany) 1974 | Did not qualify | | | | | | | | 8 | 3 | 4 | 1 | 10 | 4 |
| (Argentina) 1978 | Did not qualify | | | | | | | | 12 | 5 | 6 | 1 | 16 | 9 |
| (Spain) 1982 | Did not qualify | | | | | | | | 3 | 2 | 0 | 1 | 7 | 4 |
| (Mexico) 1986 | Group stage | 3 | 0 | 1 | 2 | 4 | 7 | Squad | 8 | 7 | 0 | 1 | 17 | 3 |
| (Italy) 1990 | Group stage | 3 | 0 | 0 | 3 | 1 | 6 | Squad | 11 | 9 | 2 | 0 | 30 | 1 |
| (United States) 1994 | Group stage | 3 | 0 | 2 | 1 | 4 | 5 | Squad | 13 | 9 | 3 | 1 | 32 | 5 |
| (France) 1998 | Group stage | 3 | 0 | 1 | 2 | 2 | 9 | Squad | 12 | 9 | 2 | 1 | 28 | 8 |
| (South Korea) (Japan) 2002 | Fourth place | 7 | 3 | 2 | 2 | 8 | 6 | Squad | Qualified as hosts | | | | | |
| (Germany) 2006 | Group stage | 3 | 1 | 1 | 1 | 3 | 4 | Squad | 12 | 7 | 3 | 2 | 18 | 7 |
| (South Africa) 2010 | Round of 16 | 4 | 1 | 1 | 2 | 6 | 8 | Squad | 14 | 7 | 7 | 0 | 22 | 7 |
| (Brazil) 2014 | Group stage | 3 | 0 | 1 | 2 | 3 | 6 | Squad | 14 | 8 | 3 | 3 | 27 | 11 |
| (Russia) 2018 | Group stage | 3 | 1 | 0 | 2 | 3 | 3 | Squad | 18 | 12 | 3 | 3 | 38 | 10 |
| (Qatar) 2022 | Round of 16 | 4 | 1 | 1 | 2 | 5 | 8 | Squad | 16 | 12 | 3 | 1 | 35 | 4 |
| (Canada) (Mexico) (United States) 2026 | Group stage | 3 | 1 | 0 | 2 | 2 | 3 | Squad | 16 | 11 | 5 | 0 | 40 | 8 |
| (Morocco) (Portugal) (Spain) 2030 | To be determined | | | | | | | | To be determined | | | | | |
| (Saudi Arabia) 2034 | To be determined | | | | | | | | To be determined | | | | | |
| Total | Fourth place | 41 | 8 | 10 | 23 | 41 | 81 | 12/20 (Note: Statistics since 1948, when South Korea became a member of FIFA.) | 167 | 105 | 44 | 18 | 339 | 98 |

== Team records ==
=== General records ===
- First match: South Korea v. Hungary, 1954 FIFA World Cup, 17 June 1954
- Biggest win: 2–0, occurred on three occasions:
  - South Korea v. Poland, 2002 FIFA World Cup, 4 June 2002
  - South Korea v. Greece, 2010 FIFA World Cup, 12 June 2010
  - South Korea v. Germany, 2018 FIFA World Cup, 27 June 2018
- Biggest defeat: 0–9, South Korea v. Hungary, 1954 FIFA World Cup, 17 June 1954

=== World records ===
Fastest goal conceded from kickoff
11 seconds, Hakan Şükür (for Turkey against South Korea), 2002
Most goals conceded, one tournament
16, Hong Deok-young, 1954
Worst goal difference, one tournament
−16, South Korea, 1954
Biggest margin of loss
9, Hungary 9–0 South Korea, 1954 (joint record)
Biggest upset in the knockout stage, per FIFA rankings
+34 – South Korea (ranked 40) won 2–1 over Italy (ranked 6), 2002
Biggest upset of a defending champion, per FIFA rankings
+56 – South Korea (ranked 57) won 2–0 over Germany (ranked 1), 2018
Biggest upset of a top ranked team, per FIFA rankings
+56 – South Korea (ranked 57) won 2–0 over Germany (ranked 1), 2018

== Head-to-head record ==
| Opponent | Pld | W | D | L | GF | GA | GD | Confederation |
|---|---|---|---|---|---|---|---|---|
| Algeria | 1 | 0 | 0 | 1 | 2 | 4 | −2 | CAF |
| Argentina | 2 | 0 | 0 | 2 | 2 | 7 | −5 | CONMEBOL |
| Belgium | 3 | 0 | 1 | 2 | 1 | 4 | −3 | UEFA |
| Bolivia | 1 | 0 | 1 | 0 | 0 | 0 | 0 | CONMEBOL |
| Brazil | 1 | 0 | 0 | 1 | 1 | 4 | –3 | CONMEBOL |
| Bulgaria | 1 | 0 | 1 | 0 | 1 | 1 | 0 | UEFA |
| Czech Republic | 1 | 1 | 0 | 0 | 2 | 1 | +1 | UEFA |
| France | 1 | 0 | 1 | 0 | 1 | 1 | 0 | UEFA |
| Germany | 3 | 1 | 0 | 2 | 4 | 4 | 0 | UEFA |
| Ghana | 1 | 0 | 0 | 1 | 2 | 3 | −1 | CAF |
| Greece | 1 | 1 | 0 | 0 | 2 | 0 | +2 | UEFA |
| Hungary | 1 | 0 | 0 | 1 | 0 | 9 | −9 | UEFA |
| Italy | 2 | 1 | 0 | 1 | 4 | 4 | 0 | UEFA |
| Mexico | 3 | 0 | 0 | 3 | 2 | 6 | −4 | CONCACAF |
| Netherlands | 1 | 0 | 0 | 1 | 0 | 5 | −5 | UEFA |
| Nigeria | 1 | 0 | 1 | 0 | 2 | 2 | 0 | CAF |
| Poland | 1 | 1 | 0 | 0 | 2 | 0 | +2 | UEFA |
| Portugal | 2 | 2 | 0 | 0 | 3 | 1 | +2 | UEFA |
| Russia | 1 | 0 | 1 | 0 | 1 | 1 | 0 | UEFA |
| South Africa | 1 | 0 | 0 | 1 | 0 | 1 | –1 | CAF |
| Spain | 3 | 0 | 2 | 1 | 3 | 5 | −2 | UEFA |
| Sweden | 1 | 0 | 0 | 1 | 0 | 1 | −1 | UEFA |
| Switzerland | 1 | 0 | 0 | 1 | 0 | 2 | −2 | UEFA |
| Togo | 1 | 1 | 0 | 0 | 2 | 1 | +1 | CAF |
| Turkey | 2 | 0 | 0 | 2 | 2 | 10 | −8 | UEFA |
| United States | 1 | 0 | 1 | 0 | 1 | 1 | 0 | CONCACAF |
| Uruguay | 3 | 0 | 1 | 2 | 1 | 3 | −2 | CONMEBOL |
| Total | 41 | 8 | 10 | 23 | 41 | 81 | –40 | |

== Player records ==
=== Most appearances ===
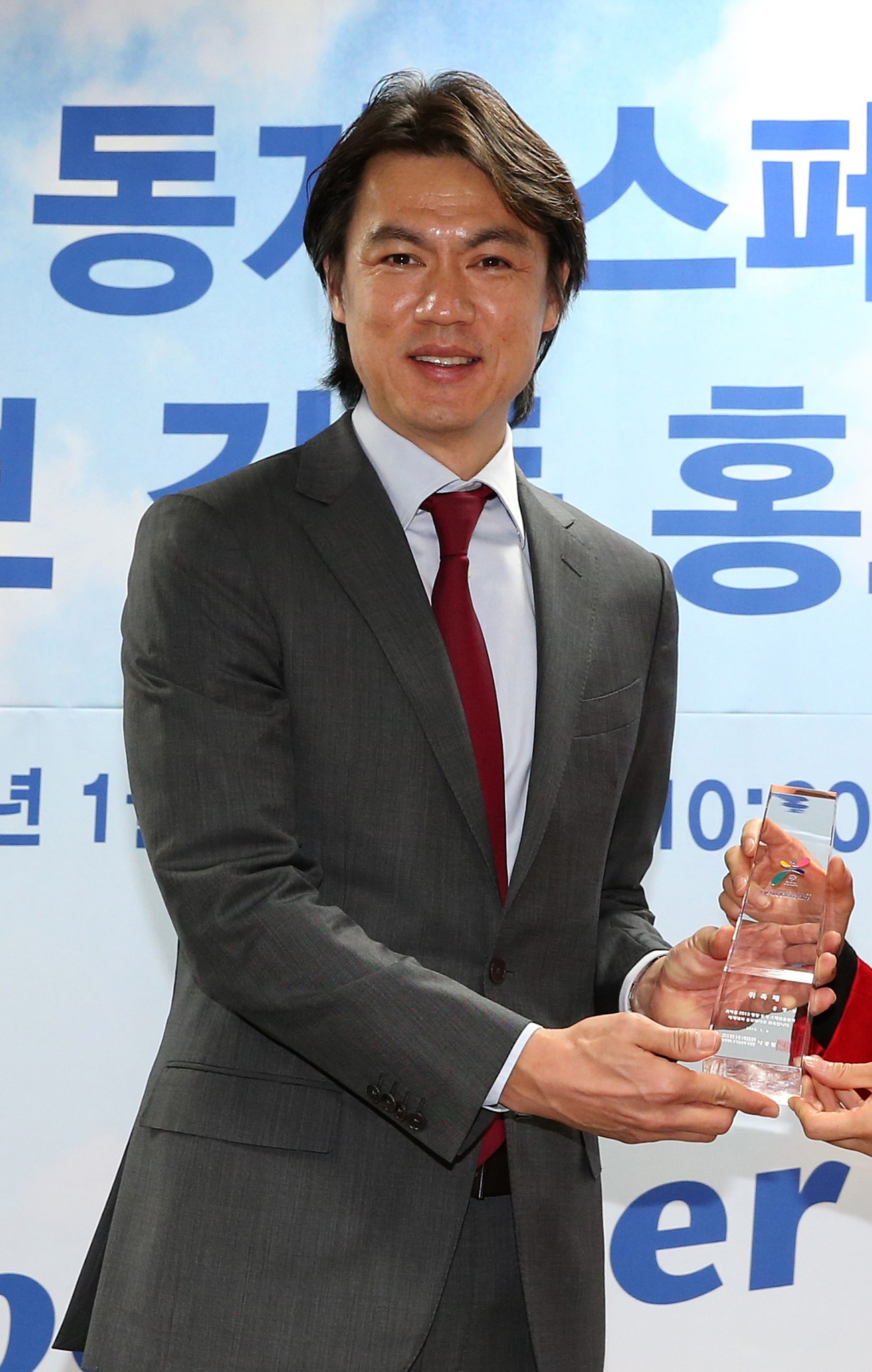
Hong Myung-bo is South Korea's most-capped player at the FIFA World Cup.

| Rank | Player | Appearances | World Cups |
|---|---|---|---|
| 1 | Hong Myung-bo | 16 | 1990, 1994, 1998 and 2002 |
| 2 | Park Ji-sung | 14 | 2002, 2006 and 2010 |
| 3 | Son Heung-min | 13 | 2014, 2018, 2022 and 2026 |
| 4 | Lee Young-pyo | 12 | 2002, 2006 and 2010 |
| 5 | Lee Woon-jae | 11 | 1994, 2002 and 2006 |
| 5 | Kim Nam-il | 11 | 2002, 2006 and 2010 |
| 7 | Hwang Sun-hong | 10 | 1990, 1994 and 2002 |
| 7 | Kim Tae-young | 10 | 1998 and 2002 |
| 7 | Yoo Sang-chul | 10 | 1998 and 2002 |
| 7 | Ahn Jung-hwan | 10 | 2002 and 2006 |
| 7 | Lee Chun-soo | 10 | 2002 and 2006 |
| 7 | Kim Young-gwon | 10 | 2014, 2018 and 2022 |

=== Top goalscorers ===
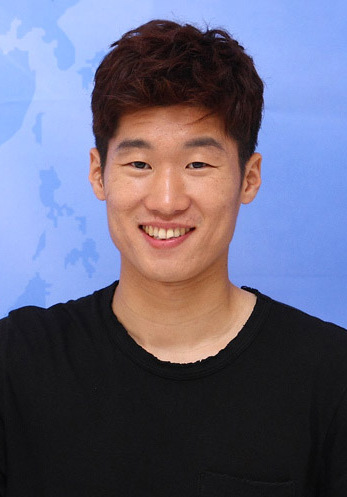
Park Ji-sung is the only South Korean player to score at three different FIFA World Cups.

| Rank | Player | Goals | World Cups |
|---|---|---|---|
| 1 | Ahn Jung-hwan | 3 | 2002 and 2006 |
| 1 | Park Ji-sung | 3 | 2002, 2006 and 2010 |
| 1 | Son Heung-min | 3 | 2014, 2018, 2022 and 2026 |
| 4 | Hong Myung-bo | 2 | 1990, 1994, 1998 and 2002 |
| 4 | Hwang Sun-hong | 2 | 1990, 1994 and 2002 |
| 4 | Yoo Sang-chul | 2 | 1998 and 2002 |
| 4 | Lee Chung-yong | 2 | 2010 and 2014 |
| 4 | Lee Jung-soo | 2 | 2010 |
| 4 | Kim Young-gwon | 2 | 2014, 2018 and 2022 |
| 4 | Cho Gue-sung | 2 | 2022 and 2026 |

== Awards ==
South Korea is the only Asian team to ever win a team award at a FIFA World Cup when they were voted the Most Entertaining Team in 2002 after finishing in fourth place. In the same year, Hong Myung-bo and Yoo Sang-chul were voted members of the All-star team. They are the only two Asians ever to be named in an All-star team. Hong also received the Bronze Ball award, becoming the first Asian player ever to receive the award.

== Details ==
=== 1954 (Switzerland) ===
South Korea made their World Cup debut in 1954, becoming the second Asian team after Indonesia to ever enter the World Cup. Qualifying occurred in March 1954, barely one year after the end of the Korean War. Only South Korea and Japan competed for the Asian spot at the World Cup, and as the Koreans refused to give visas to their rivals and former colonizers, both qualifier games were held in Tokyo. With a squad that consisted entirely of army personnel, South Korea eliminated Japan with a 5–1 victory followed by a 2–2 draw.

South Korea played games against Hungary and Turkey, losing 9–0 and 7–0 respectively. Hong Deok-young became the goalkeeper to concede the most goals in a single World Cup.

| 17 June Group 2 | Hungary | 9–0 | South Korea | Hardturm Stadium, Zürich |
| 18:00 UTC+1 | Puskás 12', 89'; Lantos 18'; Kocsis 24', 36', 50'; Czibor 59'; Palotás 75', 83' | Report | | Attendance: 18,000; Referee: Raymond Vincenti (France) |

| 20 June Group 2 | Turkey | 7–0 | South Korea | Charmilles Stadium, Geneva |
| 17:00 UTC+1 | Suat 10', 30'; Lefter 24'; Burhan 37', 64', 70'; Erol 76' | Report | | Attendance: 3,000; Referee: Esteban Marino (Uruguay) |

Group 2 table
| Pos | Team | Pld | W | D | L | GF | GA | GD | Pts | Qualification |
|---|---|---|---|---|---|---|---|---|---|---|
| 1 | Hungary | 2 | 2 | 0 | 0 | 17 | 3 | +14 | 4 | Advanced to knockout stage |
| 2 | West Germany | 2 | 1 | 0 | 1 | 7 | 9 | −2 | 2 (Note: Second place decided over through play-off: West Germany 7–2 Turkey.) | Advanced to knockout stage |
| 3 | Turkey | 2 | 1 | 0 | 1 | 10 | 11 | −1 | 2 | |
| 4 | South Korea | 2 | 0 | 0 | 2 | 0 | 16 | −16 | 0 | |

Source: FIFA

=== 1986 (Mexico) ===
South Korea started the first round of the Asian qualification against Malaysia and Nepal. After qualifying for the knockout stage as group winners of the first round, South Korea beat Indonesia and Japan in the second round and the final round, respectively. They received one of the two available World Cup spots for Asian teams.

In the World Cup finals, South Korea were allocated in group A with Argentina, Bulgaria and Italy. Their first match was against Argentina, who defeated them 3–1 with Diego Maradona playing a major role. In the match, Park Chang-sun scored the first South Korean goal in the World Cup history. South Korea drew the second match 1–1 with Bulgaria in a downpour, and lost the last group match 3–2 to defending champions Italy.

| 2 June Group A | Argentina | 3–1 | South Korea | Estadio Olímpico Universitario, Mexico City |
| 12:00 UTC−5 | Valdano 6', 46'; Ruggeri 18' | Report | Park Chang-sun 73' | Attendance: 60,000; Referee: Victoriano Sánchez Arminio (Spain) |

| 5 June Group A | South Korea | 1–1 | Bulgaria | Estadio Olímpico Universitario, Mexico City |
| 16:00 UTC−5 | Kim Jong-boo 70' | Report | Getov 11' | Attendance: 45,000; Referee: Fallaj Al Shanar (Saudi Arabia) |

| 10 June Group A | South Korea | 2–3 | Italy | Estadio Cuauhtémoc, Puebla |
| 12:00 UTC−5 | Choi Soon-ho 62'; Huh Jung-moo 83' | Report | Altobelli 17', 73'; Cho Kwang-rae 82' (o.g.) | Attendance: 20,000; Referee: David Socha (United States) |

Group A table
| Pos | Team | Pld | W | D | L | GF | GA | GD | Pts | Qualification |
|---|---|---|---|---|---|---|---|---|---|---|
| 1 | Argentina | 3 | 2 | 1 | 0 | 6 | 2 | +4 | 5 | Advanced to knockout stage |
| 2 | Italy | 3 | 1 | 2 | 0 | 5 | 4 | +1 | 4 | Advanced to knockout stage |
| 3 | Bulgaria | 3 | 0 | 2 | 1 | 2 | 4 | −2 | 2 | Advanced to knockout stage |
| 4 | South Korea | 3 | 0 | 1 | 2 | 4 | 7 | −3 | 1 | |

Source: FIFA

=== 1990 (Italy) ===
South Korea won the Asian qualifying competition with nine victories and two draws without a defeat. However, they lost all three group matches against Belgium, Spain and Uruguay. Hwangbo Kwan scored the only tournament goal for South Korea with a long-range shot against Spain.

| 12 June Group E | Belgium | 2–0 | South Korea | Stadio Marc'Antonio Bentegodi, Verona |
| 17:00 UTC+2 | Degryse 53'; De Wolf 64' | Report | | Attendance: 32,790; Referee: Vincent Mauro (United States) |

| 17 June Group E | South Korea | 1–3 | Spain | Stadio Friuli, Udine |
| 21:00 UTC+2 | Hwangbo Kwan 42' | Report | Míchel 22', 61', 81' | Attendance: 32,733; Referee: Elías Jácome (Ecuador) |

| 21 June Group E | South Korea | 0–1 | Uruguay | Stadio Friuli, Udine |
| 17:00 UTC+2 | | Report | Fonseca 90' | Attendance: 29,039; Referee: Tullio Lanese (Italy) |

Group E table
| Pos | Team | Pld | W | D | L | GF | GA | GD | Pts | Qualification |
|---|---|---|---|---|---|---|---|---|---|---|
| 1 | Spain | 3 | 2 | 1 | 0 | 5 | 2 | +3 | 5 | Advanced to knockout stage |
| 2 | Belgium | 3 | 2 | 0 | 1 | 6 | 3 | +3 | 4 | Advanced to knockout stage |
| 3 | Uruguay | 3 | 1 | 1 | 1 | 2 | 3 | −1 | 3 | Advanced to knockout stage |
| 4 | South Korea | 3 | 0 | 0 | 3 | 1 | 6 | −5 | 0 | |

Source: FIFA
Rules for classification: Group stage tiebreakers

=== 1994 (United States) ===
In the final round of the Asian qualification, the top two countries could advance to the 1994 FIFA World Cup, but South Korea was one point behind Japan and Saudi Arabia prior to playing the last qualifier against North Korea. South Korea couldn't qualify for the World Cup without a help of other countries. An Iraqi forward Jaffar Omran scored the equaliser in the last seconds of the match against Japan, and their match ended in a 2–2 draw. In their match, South Korea defeated North Korea 3–0, finishing with the same number of points as Japan. Conclusionally, South Korea succeeded in getting a World Cup ticket with a better goal difference than Japan, and this result was called the "Miracle of Doha" in South Korea.

At the 1994 World Cup, South Korea made tight games with Spain and Bolivia, but they were eliminated in the group stage after losing 3–2 to Germany.

| 17 June Group C | Spain | 2–2 | South Korea | Cotton Bowl, Dallas |
| 18:35 CDT (UTC–5) | Salinas 51'; Goikoetxea 55' | Report | Hong Myung-bo 85'; Seo Jung-won 90' | Attendance: 56,247; Referee: Peter Mikkelsen (Denmark) |

| 23 June Group C | South Korea | 0–0 | Bolivia | Foxboro Stadium, Foxborough |
| 19:35 EDT (UTC–4) | | Report | | Attendance: 54,453; Referee: Leslie Mottram (Scotland) |

| 27 June Group C | Germany | 3–2 | South Korea | Cotton Bowl, Dallas |
| 15:05 CDT (UTC–5) | Klinsmann 12', 37'; Riedle 20' | Report | Hwang Sun-hong 52'; Hong Myung-bo 63' | Attendance: 63,998; Referee: Joël Quiniou (France) |

Group C table
| Pos | Team | Pld | W | D | L | GF | GA | GD | Pts | Qualification |
|---|---|---|---|---|---|---|---|---|---|---|
| 1 | Germany | 3 | 2 | 1 | 0 | 5 | 3 | +2 | 7 | Advanced to knockout stage |
| 2 | Spain | 3 | 1 | 2 | 0 | 6 | 4 | +2 | 5 | Advanced to knockout stage |
| 3 | South Korea | 3 | 0 | 2 | 1 | 4 | 5 | −1 | 2 | |
| 4 | Bolivia | 3 | 0 | 1 | 2 | 1 | 4 | −3 | 1 | |

Source: FIFA

=== 1998 (France) ===
South Korea's former star player Cha Bum-kun managed the national team at the 1998 FIFA World Cup. In the first half of the first match against Mexico, Ha Seok-ju scored the opening goal with a free kick, but he was sent off for an ill-advised tackle three minutes later. In the second half, South Korea failed to defend their 1–0 lead as Mexico scored three goals. They lost 5–0 to the Netherlands in the following match, and Cha was fired after the match. The assistant manager Kim Pyung-seok replaced Cha, leading a 1–1 draw with Belgium.

| 13 June Group E | South Korea | 1–3 | Mexico | Stade Gerland, Lyon |
| 17:30 UTC+2 | Ha Seok-ju 28' | Report | Peláez 51'; Hernández 74', 84' | Attendance: 39,100; Referee: Günter Benkö (Austria) |

| 20 June Group E | Netherlands | 5–0 | South Korea | Stade Vélodrome, Marseille |
| 21:00 UTC+2 | Cocu 38'; Overmars 42'; Bergkamp 71'; van Hooijdonk 80'; R. de Boer 83' | Report | | Attendance: 55,000; Referee: Ryszard Wójcik (Poland) |

| 25 June Group E | Belgium | 1–1 | South Korea | Parc des Princes, Paris |
| 16:00 UTC+2 | Nilis 7' | Report | Yoo Sang-chul 71' | Attendance: 45,500; Referee: Márcio Rezende de Freitas (Brazil) |

Group E table
| Pos | Team | Pld | W | D | L | GF | GA | GD | Pts | Qualification |
|---|---|---|---|---|---|---|---|---|---|---|
| 1 | Netherlands | 3 | 1 | 2 | 0 | 7 | 2 | +5 | 5 | Advanced to knockout stage |
| 2 | Mexico | 3 | 1 | 2 | 0 | 7 | 5 | +2 | 5 | Advanced to knockout stage |
| 3 | Belgium | 3 | 0 | 3 | 0 | 3 | 3 | 0 | 3 | |
| 4 | South Korea | 3 | 0 | 1 | 2 | 2 | 9 | −7 | 1 | |

Source: FIFA

=== 2002 (South Korea and Japan) ===
South Korea was one of the host nations of the 2002 FIFA World Cup, along with Japan. Led by Dutch manager Guus Hiddink and his countryman Pim Verbeek, South Korean team won their first group match against Poland, achieving their first-ever World Cup victory. Afterwards, they drew 1–1 with the United States in the following match and furthermore, they defeated Portugal 1–0 in the last group match, qualifying for the knockout stage as the group winners.

In the round of 16, South Korea defeated Italy 2–1 after extra time, although there were controversial refereeing decisions including Francesco Totti's second yellow card and an offside decision against Damiano Tommasi. South Korea also defeated Spain on penalties in the quarter-finals, surpassing North Korea's result in 1966. However, their run was halted by losing 1–0 to Germany in the semi-finals. They finished fourth in the tournament after losing 3–2 to Turkey in the match for third place. Team captain Hong Myung-bo won the Bronze Ball award.

| 4 June Group D | South Korea | 2–0 | Poland | Busan Asiad Main Stadium, Busan |
| 20:30 UTC+9 | Hwang Sun-hong 26'; Yoo Sang-chul 53' | Report | | Attendance: 48,760; Referee: Oscar Ruíz (Colombia) |

| 10 June Group D | South Korea | 1–1 | United States | Daegu World Cup Stadium, Daegu |
| 15:30 UTC+9 | Ahn Jung-hwan 78' | Report | Mathis 24' | Attendance: 60,778; Referee: Urs Meier (Switzerland) |

| 14 June Group D | Portugal | 0–1 | South Korea | Incheon Munhak Stadium, Incheon |
| 20:30 UTC+9 | | Report | Park Ji-sung 70' | Attendance: 50,239; Referee: Ángel Sánchez (Argentina) |

Group D table
| Pos | Team | Pld | W | D | L | GF | GA | GD | Pts | Qualification |
|---|---|---|---|---|---|---|---|---|---|---|
| 1 | South Korea (H) | 3 | 2 | 1 | 0 | 4 | 1 | +3 | 7 | Advanced to knockout stage |
| 2 | United States | 3 | 1 | 1 | 1 | 5 | 6 | −1 | 4 | Advanced to knockout stage |
| 3 | Portugal | 3 | 1 | 0 | 2 | 6 | 4 | +2 | 3 | |
| 4 | Poland | 3 | 1 | 0 | 2 | 3 | 7 | −4 | 3 | |

Source: FIFA
Rules for classification: Group stage tiebreakers
(H) Hosts

| 18 June Round of 16 | South Korea | 2–1 (a.e.t.) | Italy | Daejeon World Cup Stadium, Daejeon |
| 20:30 UTC+9 | Seol Ki-hyeon 88'; Ahn Jung-hwan 117' | Report | Vieri 18' | Attendance: 38,588; Referee: Byron Moreno (Ecuador) |

| 22 June Quarter-finals | Spain | 0–0 (a.e.t.) (3–5 p) | South Korea | Gwangju World Cup Stadium, Gwangju |
| 15:30 UTC+9 | | Report | | Attendance: 42,114; Referee: Gamal Al-Ghandour (Egypt) |
| | Penalties |
| | Hierro (penalty scored); Baraja (penalty scored); Xavi (penalty scored); Joaquín (penalty missed) | | (penalty scored) Hwang Sun-hong; (penalty scored) Park Ji-sung; (penalty scored) Seol Ki-hyeon; (penalty scored) Ahn Jung-hwan; (penalty scored) Hong Myung-bo |

| 25 June Semi-finals | Germany | 1–0 | South Korea | Seoul World Cup Stadium, Seoul |
| 20:30 UTC+9 | Ballack 75' | Report | | Attendance: 65,256; Referee: Urs Meier (Switzerland) |

| 29 June Match for third place | South Korea | 2–3 | Turkey | Daegu World Cup Stadium, Daegu |
| 20:00 UTC+9 | Lee Eul-yong 9'; Song Chong-gug 90+3' | Report | Hakan Şükür 1'; İlhan 13', 32' | Attendance: 63,483; Referee: Saad Mane (Kuwait) |

=== 2006 (Germany) ===
Former manager Jo Bonfrère qualified for the 2006 FIFA World Cup, but failed to satisfy the expectations of the Korea Football Association. Dick Advocaat replaced Bonfrère to participate in the World Cup, but Advocaat secretly contracted with a Russian club Zenit Saint Petersburg just before the tournament, for which he was criticized.

Despite controversies about managers, South Korea defeated Togo 2–1 and drew 1–1 with eventual finalists France. However, they were eliminated in the group stage after losing 2–0 to Switzerland in the last match.

| 13 June Group G | South Korea | 2–1 | Togo | FIFA WM Stadion Frankfurt, Frankfurt |
| 15:00 UTC+2 | Lee Chun-soo 54'; Ahn Jung-hwan 72' | Report | Kader 31' | Attendance: 48,000; Referee: Graham Poll (England) |

| 18 June Group G | France | 1–1 | South Korea | Zentralstadion, Leipzig |
| 21:00 UTC+2 | Henry 9' | Report | Park Ji-sung 81' | Attendance: 43,000; Referee: Benito Archundia (Mexico) |

| 23 June Group G | Switzerland | 2–0 | South Korea | FIFA WM Stadion Hannover, Hanover |
| 21:00 UTC+2 | Senderos 23'; Frei 77' | Report | | Attendance: 43,000; Referee: Horacio Elizondo (Argentina) |

Group G table
| Pos | Team | Pld | W | D | L | GF | GA | GD | Pts | Qualification |
|---|---|---|---|---|---|---|---|---|---|---|
| 1 | Switzerland | 3 | 2 | 1 | 0 | 4 | 0 | +4 | 7 | Advanced to knockout stage |
| 2 | France | 3 | 1 | 2 | 0 | 3 | 1 | +2 | 5 | Advanced to knockout stage |
| 3 | South Korea | 3 | 1 | 1 | 1 | 3 | 4 | −1 | 4 | |
| 4 | Togo | 3 | 0 | 0 | 3 | 1 | 6 | −5 | 0 | |

Source: FIFA
Rules for classification: Group stage tiebreakers

=== 2010 (South Africa) ===
The South Korean FA appointed Hiddink's predecessor Huh Jung-moo as manager again after Pim Verbeek resigned due to mental stress at the 2007 AFC Asian Cup. Under Huh, South Korea won their group in the final round (fourth round) of the Asian qualifiers with four victories and four draws without a loss, easily qualifying for the 2010 tournament. Park Ji-sung, Park Chu-young, Lee Chung-yong, and Ki Sung-yueng were in charge of South Korea's attack in the qualifiers, and were evaluated as four key players among the squad of the time.

South Korea finished second in the Group B with four points, qualifying for the knockout stage. They were then eliminated from the tournament after losing to Uruguay in the round of 16.

| 12 June Group B | South Korea | 2–0 | Greece | Nelson Mandela Bay Stadium, Port Elizabeth |
| 13:30 UTC+2 | Lee Jung-soo 7'; Park Ji-sung 52' | Report | | Attendance: 31,513; Referee: Michael Hester (New Zealand) |

| 17 June Group B | Argentina | 4–1 | South Korea | Soccer City, Johannesburg |
| 13:30 UTC+2 | Park Chu-young 17' (o.g.); Higuaín 33', 76', 80' | Report | Lee Chung-yong 45+1' | Attendance: 82,174; Referee: Frank De Bleeckere (Belgium) |

| 22 June Group B | Nigeria | 2–2 | South Korea | Moses Mabhida Stadium, Durban |
| 20:30 UTC+2 | Uche 12'; Yakubu 69' (pen.) | Report | Lee Jung-soo 38'; Park Chu-young 49' | Attendance: 61,874; Referee: Olegário Benquerença (Portugal) |

Group B table
| Pos | Team | Pld | W | D | L | GF | GA | GD | Pts | Qualification |
|---|---|---|---|---|---|---|---|---|---|---|
| 1 | Argentina | 3 | 3 | 0 | 0 | 7 | 1 | +6 | 9 | Advanced to knockout stage |
| 2 | South Korea | 3 | 1 | 1 | 1 | 5 | 6 | −1 | 4 | Advanced to knockout stage |
| 3 | Greece | 3 | 1 | 0 | 2 | 2 | 5 | −3 | 3 | |
| 4 | Nigeria | 3 | 0 | 1 | 2 | 3 | 5 | −2 | 1 | |

Source: FIFA
Rules for classification: Group stage tiebreakers

| 26 June Round of 16 | Uruguay | 2–1 | South Korea | Nelson Mandela Bay Stadium, Port Elizabeth |
| 16:00 UTC+2 | Suárez 8', 80' | Report | Lee Chung-yong 68' | Attendance: 30,597; Referee: Wolfgang Stark (Germany) |

=== 2014 (Brazil) ===
Hong Myung-bo became the national team manager one year before the 2014 World Cup, and had to prepare for the competition in a short period of time. He called the bronze medalists of the 2012 Summer Olympics who had been led by him, but performed below par in the World Cup. They were pelted with yeot (a traditional Korean confectionery, which can sometimes be used to express insults) when they returned to South Korea.

| 17 June Group H | Russia | 1–1 | South Korea | Arena Pantanal, Cuiabá |
| 18:00 BRT–1 (UTC−4) | Kerzhakov 74' | Report | Lee Keun-ho 68' | Attendance: 37,603; Referee: Néstor Pitana (Argentina) |

| 22 June Group H | South Korea | 2–4 | Algeria | Estádio Beira-Rio, Porto Alegre |
| 16:00 BRT (UTC−3) | Son Heung-min 50'; Koo Ja-cheol 72' | Report | Slimani 26'; Halliche 28'; Djabou 38'; Brahimi 62' | Attendance: 42,732; Referee: Wilmar Roldán (Colombia) |

| 26 June Group H | South Korea | 0–1 | Belgium | Arena Corinthians, São Paulo |
| 17:00 BRT (UTC−3) | | Report | Vertonghen 78' | Attendance: 61,397; Referee: Ben Williams (Australia) |

Group H table
| Pos | Team | Pld | W | D | L | GF | GA | GD | Pts | Qualification |
|---|---|---|---|---|---|---|---|---|---|---|
| 1 | Belgium | 3 | 3 | 0 | 0 | 4 | 1 | +3 | 9 | Advanced to knockout stage |
| 2 | Algeria | 3 | 1 | 1 | 1 | 6 | 5 | +1 | 4 | Advanced to knockout stage |
| 3 | Russia | 3 | 0 | 2 | 1 | 2 | 3 | −1 | 2 | |
| 4 | South Korea | 3 | 0 | 1 | 2 | 3 | 6 | −3 | 1 | |

Source: FIFA
Rules for classification: Group stage tiebreakers

=== 2018 (Russia) ===
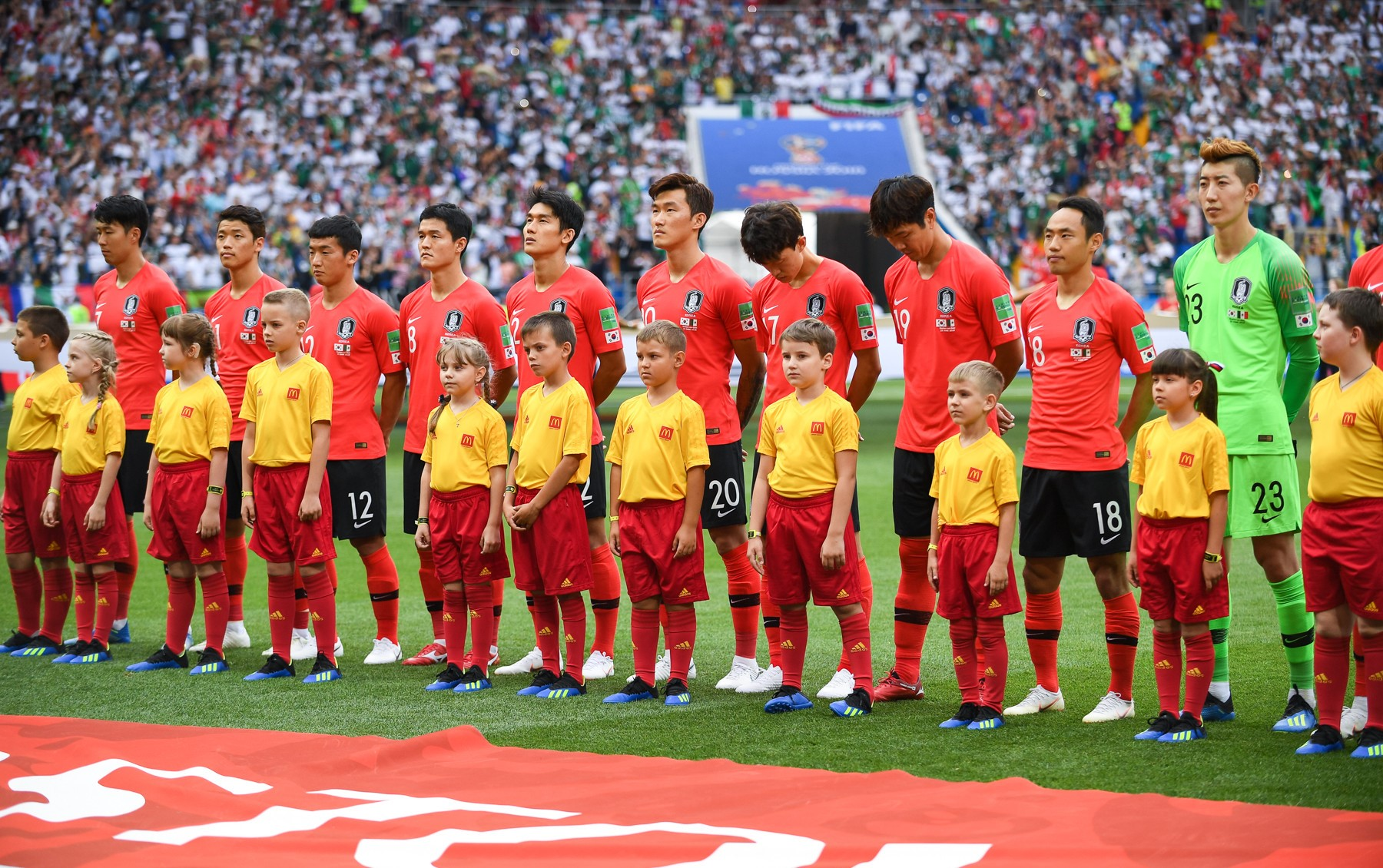
South Korea at the 2018 FIFA World Cup

For the combined qualification matches for the 2018 FIFA World Cup and the 2019 AFC Asian Cup, South Korea won all seven matches without conceding a goal in the second round but following a series of poor results in the third round of qualifiers, including losses to China and Qatar, the former manager Uli Stielike was sacked and was replaced by under-23 coach Shin Tae-yong for the remainder of the qualifying round. Under Shin Tae-yong, the team managed to qualify as the second-placed team in their group following two goalless draws against Iran and Uzbekistan, sending South Korea to the World Cup for the ninth consecutive time. Shin quickly tested various tactics after the qualifiers, but he had difficulty carrying out his plan due to injuries of many players. Some of them were eventually excluded from the team.

At the 2018 World Cup, they lost their first game against Sweden 1–0 after conceding from a penalty. They then faced Mexico and lost 2–1 after conceding another penalty. However, despite their two consecutive losses, South Korea was not eliminated just yet. To have any chance of advancing, South Korea would have to win their final group stage match against the defending champions Germany by at least two goals and Mexico would have to defeat Sweden in its last group stage game. South Korea for its part did what it had to do to stay in contention and won 2–0 against Germany with goals from Kim Young-gwon and Son Heung-min, causing them to be eliminated in the first round for the first time in 80 years. Germany had 28 shots with 6 on target, but the South Korea's defense, led by keeper Jo Hyeon-woo, did not concede once. However, Mexico lost to Sweden that same day and thus South Korea ultimately finished third in the group. As a result, South Korea saved Mexico from being eliminated and Mexican fans heavily praised the South Koreans and celebrated their victory in front of the South Korean embassy. The match is also called the "Miracle of Kazan" in South Korea although they dropped out of the tournament.

| 18 June Group F | Sweden | 1–0 | South Korea | Nizhny Novgorod Stadium, Nizhny Novgorod |
| 15:00 UTC+3 | Claesson (yellow card) 61'; Granqvist 65' (pen.) | Report | Kim Shin-wook (yellow card) 13'; Hwang Hee-chan (yellow card) 55' | Attendance: 42,300; Referee: Joel Aguilar (El Salvador) |

| 23 June Group F | South Korea | 1–2 | Mexico | Rostov Arena, Rostov-on-Don |
| 18:00 UTC+3 | Kim Young-gwon (yellow card) 58'; Lee Yong (yellow card) 63'; Lee Seung-woo (yellow card) 72'; Jung Woo-young (yellow card) 80'; Son Heung-min 90+3' | Report | Vela 26' (pen.); Hernández 66' | Attendance: 43,472; Referee: Milorad Mažić (Serbia) |

| 27 June Group F | South Korea | 2–0 | Germany | Kazan Arena, Kazan |
| 17:00 UTC+3 | Jung Woo-young (yellow card) 9'; Lee Jae-sung (yellow card) 23'; Moon Seon-min (yellow card) 48'; Son Heung-min (yellow card) 65' (goal) 90+6'; Kim Young-gwon 90+4' | Report | | Attendance: 41,835; Referee: Mark Geiger (United States) |

Group F table
| Pos | Team | Pld | W | D | L | GF | GA | GD | Pts | Qualification |
|---|---|---|---|---|---|---|---|---|---|---|
| 1 | Sweden | 3 | 2 | 0 | 1 | 5 | 2 | +3 | 6 | Advanced to knockout stage |
| 2 | Mexico | 3 | 2 | 0 | 1 | 3 | 4 | −1 | 6 | Advanced to knockout stage |
| 3 | South Korea | 3 | 1 | 0 | 2 | 3 | 3 | 0 | 3 | |
| 4 | Germany | 3 | 1 | 0 | 2 | 2 | 4 | −2 | 3 | |

Source: FIFA
Rules for classification: Group stage tiebreakers

=== 2022 (Qatar) ===
The South Korean team, led by manager Paulo Bento and captained by the reigning Premier League Golden Boot winner Son Heung-min, qualified for the World Cup as the second-placed team of the AFC qualifying group A. After a goalless draw against Uruguay and a narrow defeat against Ghana, South Korea defeated Portugal 2–1 in the final match of the group stage with a stoppage-time goal by Hwang Hee-chan. Uruguay defeated Ghana 2–0, which meant that South Korea advanced to the knockout stage for the first time since 2010 on virtue of scoring more goals than Uruguay, with the same number of points. In the round of 16, the team was eliminated after losing 4–1 to Brazil.

| 24 November Group H | Uruguay | 0–0 | South Korea | Education City Stadium, Al Rayyan |
| 16:00 UTC+3 | Cáceres (yellow card) 57' | Report | Cho Gue-sung (yellow card) 88' | Attendance: 41,663; Referee: Clément Turpin (France) |

| 28 November Group H | South Korea | 2–3 | Ghana | Education City Stadium, Al Rayyan |
| 16:00 UTC+3 | Jung Woo-young (yellow card) 27'; Cho Gue-sung 58', 61'; Kim Young-gwon (yellow card) 77' | Report | Amartey (yellow card) 21'; Salisu 24'; Kudus 34', 68'; Lamptey (yellow card) 73' | Attendance: 43,983; Referee: Anthony Taylor (England) |

| 2 December Group H | South Korea | 2–1 | Portugal | Education City Stadium, Al Rayyan |
| 18:00 UTC+3 | Kim Young-gwon 27'; Lee Kang-in (yellow card) 36'; Hwang Hee-chan 90+1' (yellow card) 90+2' | Report | Horta 5' | Attendance: 44,097; Referee: Facundo Tello (Argentina) |

Group H table
| Pos | Team | Pld | W | D | L | GF | GA | GD | Pts | Qualification |
|---|---|---|---|---|---|---|---|---|---|---|
| 1 | Portugal | 3 | 2 | 0 | 1 | 6 | 4 | +2 | 6 | Advanced to knockout stage |
| 2 | South Korea | 3 | 1 | 1 | 1 | 4 | 4 | 0 | 4 | Advanced to knockout stage |
| 3 | Uruguay | 3 | 1 | 1 | 1 | 2 | 2 | 0 | 4 | |
| 4 | Ghana | 3 | 1 | 0 | 2 | 5 | 7 | −2 | 3 | |

Source: FIFA
Rules for classification: Group stage tiebreakers

| 5 December Round of 16 | Brazil | 4–1 | South Korea | Stadium 974, Doha |
| 22:00 UTC+3 | Vinícius 7'; Neymar 13' (pen.); Richarlison 29'; Paquetá 36' | Report | Jung Woo-young (yellow card) 44'; Paik Seung-ho 76' | Attendance: 43,847; Referee: Clément Turpin (France) |

=== 2026 (Canada, Mexico and United States) ===
After previous manager Jürgen Klinsmann, directly appointed by KFA president Chung Mong-gyu, was sacked for his lack of capability at the 2023 AFC Asian Cup, the KFA established their committee in charge of finding the next manager. At first, the selection committee tried negotiating with foreign managers including Jesse Marsch, who met KFA executives before choosing Canada. However, they changed their targets to domestic managers despite some committeemen's opposition, and then selected Hong Myung-bo, who had managed South Korea at the 2014 World Cup. President Chung, who preferred foreign manager, refused this recommendation and arbitrarily authorized another executive Lee Lim-saeng to negotiate with other nominees including David Wagner and Gus Poyet, but Lee reached the same conclusion. The announcement of Hong's appointment caused great controversy due to his poor result of the past, and Park Joo-ho, a committeeman who disagreed with this announcement, disclosed problems about the selection process through YouTube.

Chung stood trial for the violation of procedure, but Hong's appointment was not reversed. Hong led South Korea to qualify for the 2026 World Cup without a defeat in the qualifiers, but did not show steady results in friendlies against World Cup participants prior to the tournament. In the group stage, South Korea made a good start by defeating Czech Republic 2–1. Afterwards, however, opposing managers easily made countermeasures against Hong's unchanging tactics, and South Korea shiftlessly lost 1–0 to both Mexico and South Africa. The Mexico game saw goalkeeper Kim Seung-gyu attempt to catch the ball, only to collide with his teammate Lee Gi-hyuk and spill the ball before it was tapped into the net by opposing player Luis Romo. South Korean forwards were still fruitless in finding a goal in their last group stage match against South Africa, although Hong decided to bench captain Son Heung-min, who showed poor performances with no goals in the previous two matches. Hong's lack of tactical change was questioned by South Korean media and fans, and he was strongly criticised for being eliminated in the group stage of the World Cup twice. Criticism included South Korean president Lee Jae Myung, who ordered an investigation into the KFA due to the amount of taxpayer money allocated. Hong resigned from his position shortly after.

| 11 June Group A | South Korea | 2–1 | Czech Republic | Estadio Akron, Zapopan |
| 20:00 UTC−6 | Hwang In-beom 67'; Oh Hyeon-gyu 80' | Report | Krejčí 59' | Attendance: 44,985; Referee: Amin Mohamed Omar (Egypt) |

| 18 June Group A | Mexico | 1–0 | South Korea | Estadio Akron, Zapopan |
| 19:00 UTC−6 | Romo 50' | Report | | Attendance: 45,522; Referee: Gustavo Tejera (Uruguay) |

| 24 June Group A | South Africa | 1–0 | South Korea | Estadio BBVA, Guadalupe |
| 19:00 UTC−6 | Maseko 63' | Report | | Attendance: 51,243; Referee: Facundo Tello (Argentina) |

Group A table
| Pos | Team | Pld | W | D | L | GF | GA | GD | Pts | Qualification |
|---|---|---|---|---|---|---|---|---|---|---|
| 1 | Mexico (H) | 3 | 3 | 0 | 0 | 6 | 0 | +6 | 9 | Advanced to knockout stage |
| 2 | South Africa | 3 | 1 | 1 | 1 | 2 | 3 | −1 | 4 | Advanced to knockout stage |
| 3 | South Korea | 3 | 1 | 0 | 2 | 2 | 3 | −1 | 3 | |
| 4 | Czech Republic | 3 | 0 | 1 | 2 | 2 | 6 | −4 | 1 | |

Source: FIFA
Rules for classification: Group stage tiebreakers
(H) Hosts

== See also ==
- History of the South Korea national football team
- Asian nations at the FIFA World Cup
- South Korea at the AFC Asian Cup
- South Korea at the CONCACAF Gold Cup
