= History of the South Korea national football team =

This article is about the history of South Korean national football teams, including youth and women's teams.

== Senior team ==
=== Early history ===
Korea (Joseon) was not introduced to the sport of association football until the late 19th century; it is often said that football in Korea dates to 1882, when Royal Navy sailors from HMS Flying Fish played a game while their vessel was visiting Incheon Port. Korea became a Japanese colony in 1905 and was annexed outright in 1910.

In 1921, the first All Joseon Football Tournament was held, and in 1928, the Joseon Football Association was organized, which created a foundation to disseminate and develop football in Korea. Korean teams participated in competitions with Japanese teams from around 1926; Joseon Football Club became a de facto national team for Koreans, and won the 1935 Emperor's Cup. Koreans also played for the Japan national team, most notably Kim Yong-sik, who played for Japan at the 1936 Summer Olympics.

The Joseon FA was reorganized in 1945 as Japanese occupation ended with the conclusion of World War II. Following the establishment of the South Korean state in the late 1940s, a new Korea Football Association (KFA) was founded in 1948 and joined FIFA, the international football governing body. The same year, the South Korean national team made its international debut and won 5–3 against Mexico at the 1948 Summer Olympics in London.

=== First World Cup team ===
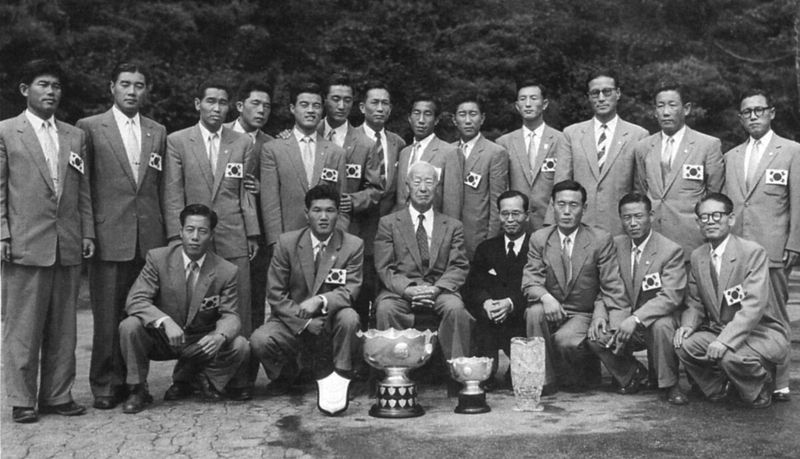
The South Korean team with the country's president Syngman Rhee after winning the 1956 AFC Asian Cup

In 1954, South Korea entered FIFA World Cup qualification for the first time, and qualified for the 1954 FIFA World Cup in Switzerland by beating Japan 7–3 on aggregate. South Korea were only the second Asian team to compete at a World Cup after the Dutch East Indies (Indonesia) in 1938, and the first fully-independent Asian nation to do so. South Korea lost their only two games by heavy margins: 9–0 against Hungary (the joint-heaviest defeat in World Cup history) and 7–0 against Turkey. Their third scheduled game, against West Germany, was never played because neither were seeded in their group, as per that tournament's rules. It would take thirty-two years before South Korea was able to participate at the World Cup again.

Two years later, South Korea won the inaugural AFC Asian Cup in 1956. They hosted the next edition in 1960 and successfully retained the title, beating South Vietnam, Israel, and Republic of China in the process. However, the South Korean players received fake medals, instead of the gold medals they had been promised, and returned them to the KFA. The KFA promised to give them real medals, but this did not occur until 2019. South Korea have not won the AFC Asian Cup since, something that has thus been attributed to the "curse of the fake gold medals."

=== Foundation of Yangzee ===
In 1965, the South Korean government was hesitant to play football matches against North Korea and thus withdrew from 1966 FIFA World Cup qualification to avoid possibly playing the northern neighbors. Kim Yong-sik, the KFA vice-president at that time, had evaluated North Korea as a world-class team. This would be proven true, as the North Koreans advanced to the quarter-finals at the 1966 FIFA World Cup in England.

In March 1967, the South Korean Central Intelligence Agency (KCIA) founded Yangzee FC, collecting footballers in South Korea to train them intensively. Yangzee players received benefits like exemption from military service, long-term overseas training and high salaries in return for intensive training. At the 1968 Summer Olympics qualification, South Korea was eliminated by goal difference, despite being tied with Japan, the group winners, on points. They also participated in the 1969 Asian Champion Club Tournament, finishing as runners-up. However, South Korea failed to qualify for the 1970 FIFA World Cup despite governmental support, and Yangzee was losing support as Kim Hyong-uk, the director of KCIA and supporter of the club, was dismissed from his post, and tensions between South and North Korea were beginning to subside. Yangzee was eventually dissolved in March 1970 without ever having played against North Korea, but players achieved a good result by winning the 1970 Asian Games.

=== Second World Cup team ===
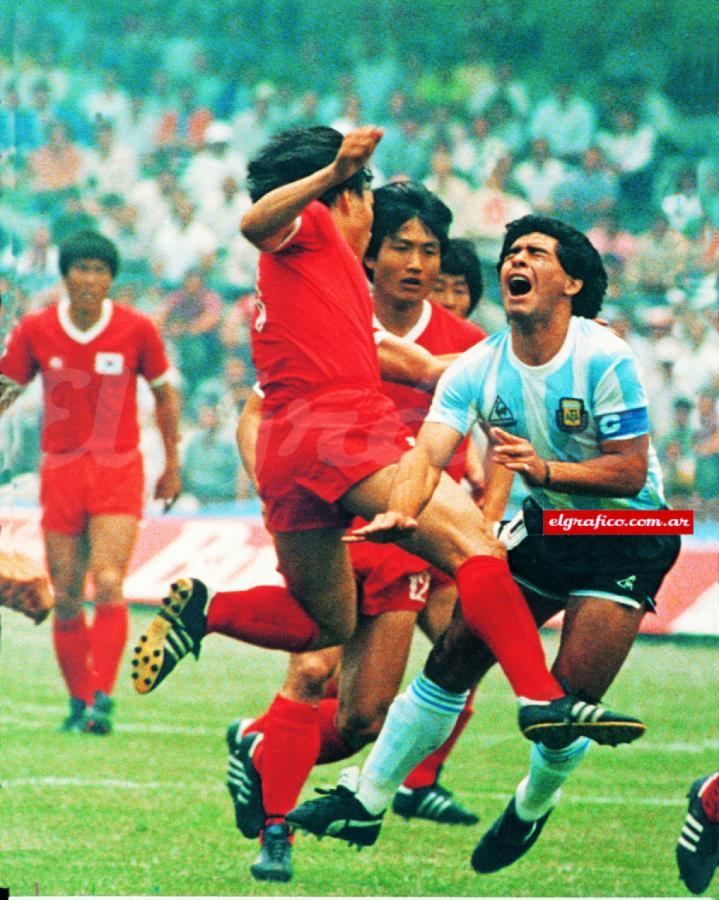
South Korean players marking Diego Maradona at the 1986 FIFA World Cup

In 1985, South Korea won the East Asian tournament of FIFA World Cup qualification including two victories against Japan in the final round, and sealed a spot at the World Cup for the first time since 1954. After one of the greatest forwards of German Bundesliga at the time, Cha Bum-kun, joined the existing champions, the South Korean squad for the 1986 FIFA World Cup was evaluated as the golden generation in their country.

South Korea lost 3–1 to the eventual champion Argentina but Park Chang-sun scored the first-ever South Korean World Cup goal in the first group match. They drew 1–1 with Bulgaria and faced the defending champion Italy in the last match. They conceded Alessandro Altobelli's opening goal, but Choi Soon-ho scored the equalizer outside the penalty area. However, Altobelli's second goal was followed by Cho Kwang-rae's fatal own goal, and South Korea lost 3–2 in the match despite Huh Jung-moo pulling one back. Afterwards, South Korean newscasts and journalists criticised the referee David Socha, claiming that his judgements about situations of the game were poor including the decision to award a penalty to Italy. South Korea redeemed their failure of World Cup success with a gold at the 1986 Asian Games.

=== Tragedy of Marseille ===
In 1997, Cha Bum-kun became the head coach going into FIFA World Cup qualification. South Korea consecutively won four early qualifiers against Kazakhstan, Uzbekistan, Japan, and the United Arab Emirates, and quickly solidified their position as first-place finishers of the group. At the 1998 FIFA World Cup in France, they lost their first match against Mexico 3–1. Ha Seok-ju scored a deflected free kick for the opening goal, but was then sent off only three minutes later for an ill-advised tackle. South Korea was then thoroughly outclassed by the Netherlands, managed by Guus Hiddink, losing 5–0 in Marseille. Cha was sacked in the middle of the group stage after the loss to the Netherlands. The only South Korean player to be praised from the match was the goalkeeper Kim Byung-ji, who conceded five of the Netherlands' 17 shots on target. The team then drew 1–1 against Belgium in their final group match.

=== Hiddink's magic ===
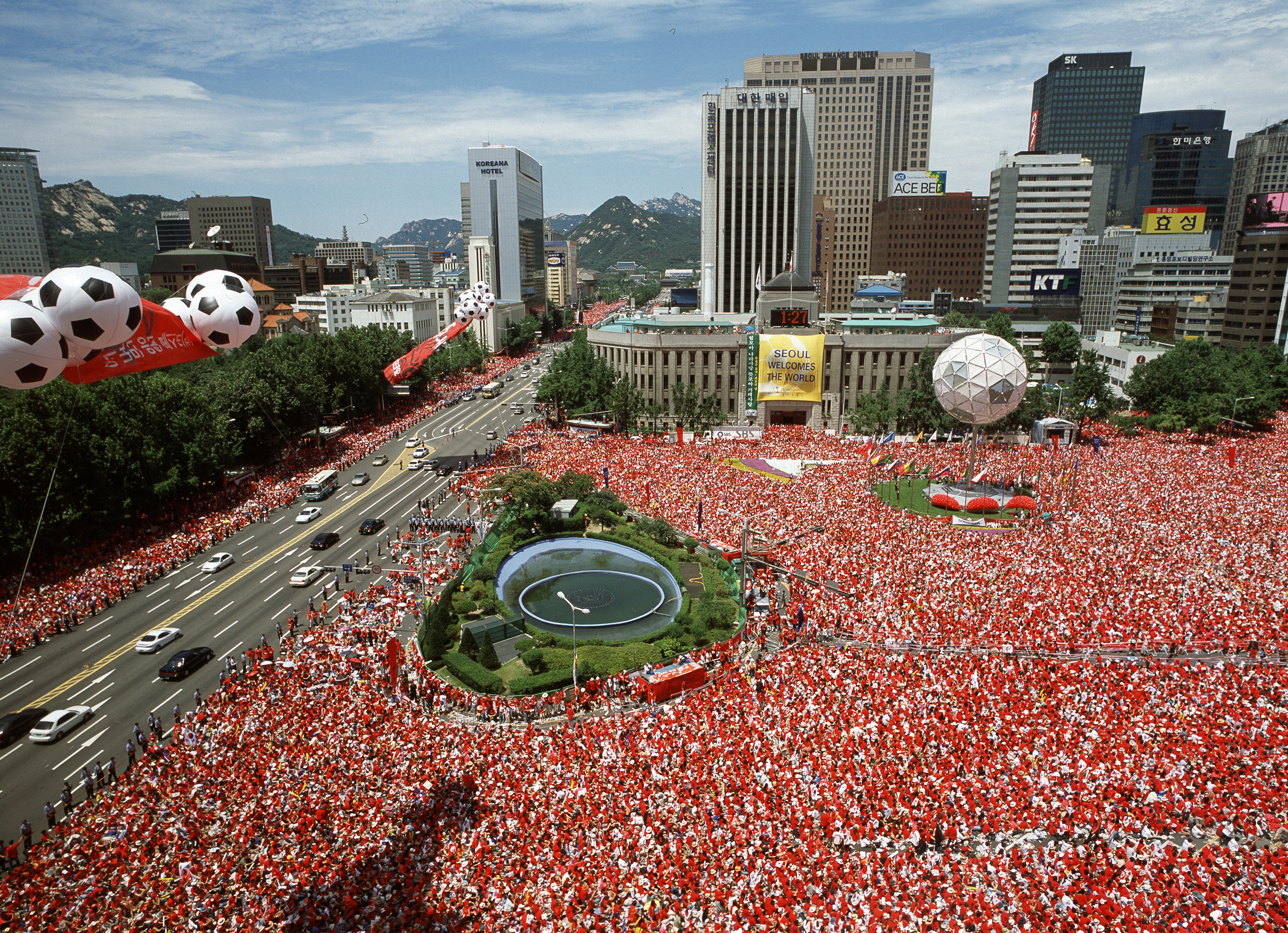

Seoul during the 2002 FIFA World Cup

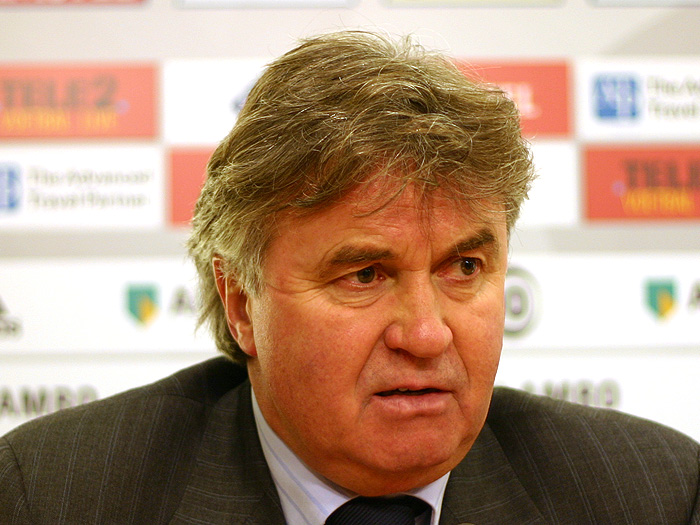
Guus Hiddink is widely regarded as the most successful manager in South Korean football history.

On 18 December 2000, the KFA named Dutch coach Guus Hiddink as the manager of the team for the 2002 FIFA World Cup, co-hosted in South Korea. At the 2001 FIFA Confederations Cup, they lost 5–0 against France, the eventual champions, and failed to advance to the semi-finals although defeating Australia and Mexico. South Korean journalists criticized Hiddink and gave him a nickname "Oh-dae-ppang", which means five to nothing in Korean, when South Korea lost 5–0 again in the friendly match against the Czech Republic after the Confederations Cup. At the 2002 CONCACAF Gold Cup, South Korea finished in fourth place with two draws and three losses without a win. However, they showed their improvement in friendly matches against European teams just before the World Cup.

South Korea co-hosted the 2002 World Cup tournament with Japan. Having never won a game in the World Cup previously, the South Korean team achieved their first ever victory in a World Cup with a 2–0 victory against Poland when the tournament began. Their next game was against the United States where they earned a 1–1 draw, with striker Ahn Jung-hwan scoring a late game equalizer. Their last game was against Portugal, who earned two red cards in the match, reducing them to nine men. Park Ji-sung scored in a 1–0 victory, allowing the South Korean team to qualify for the second round for the first time in their history. The team's success led to widespread euphoria from the South Korean public, with many people joining the Red Devils, which gained widespread attention with their passionate support of the team.

South Korea's second round opponents were Italy, who they defeated 2–1. The South Korean team was awarded an early penalty but Ahn Jung-hwan's effort was saved by Italian keeper Gianluigi Buffon. Christian Vieri then scored to put Italy ahead but Seol Ki-hyeon scored an equalizer in the 88th minute, allowing the game to go through to extra time. Francesco Totti was controversially sent off for an alleged dive and Ahn redeemed his missed penalty by scoring the winner with a headed golden goal, allowing them to advance to the quarter-final. South Korea faced Spain in the quarter-finals. Spain managed to score twice in this match, but both goals were disallowed by the referees. The game then went to the penalty shoot-out where South Korea won 5–3, thus becoming the first Asian team to reach the semi-finals. The South Korean team's run was halted by a 1–0 loss to Germany, and their tournament ended in fourth place after a loss to Turkey 3–2 in the third-place match.

Team captain Hong Myung-bo received the Bronze Ball as the third best player of the World Cup, the first Asian footballer to receive this award. In addition, Hong was named in the team of the tournament alongside teammate Yoo Sang-chul. This level of success was unprecedented for a country that had never won a World Cup match before. They went further than any Asian team, upsetting several established European teams in the process, leading to a rise in the popularity of football in the country. Hiddink became a national hero in South Korea and was granted honorary citizenship.

=== Era of Huh and Park ===
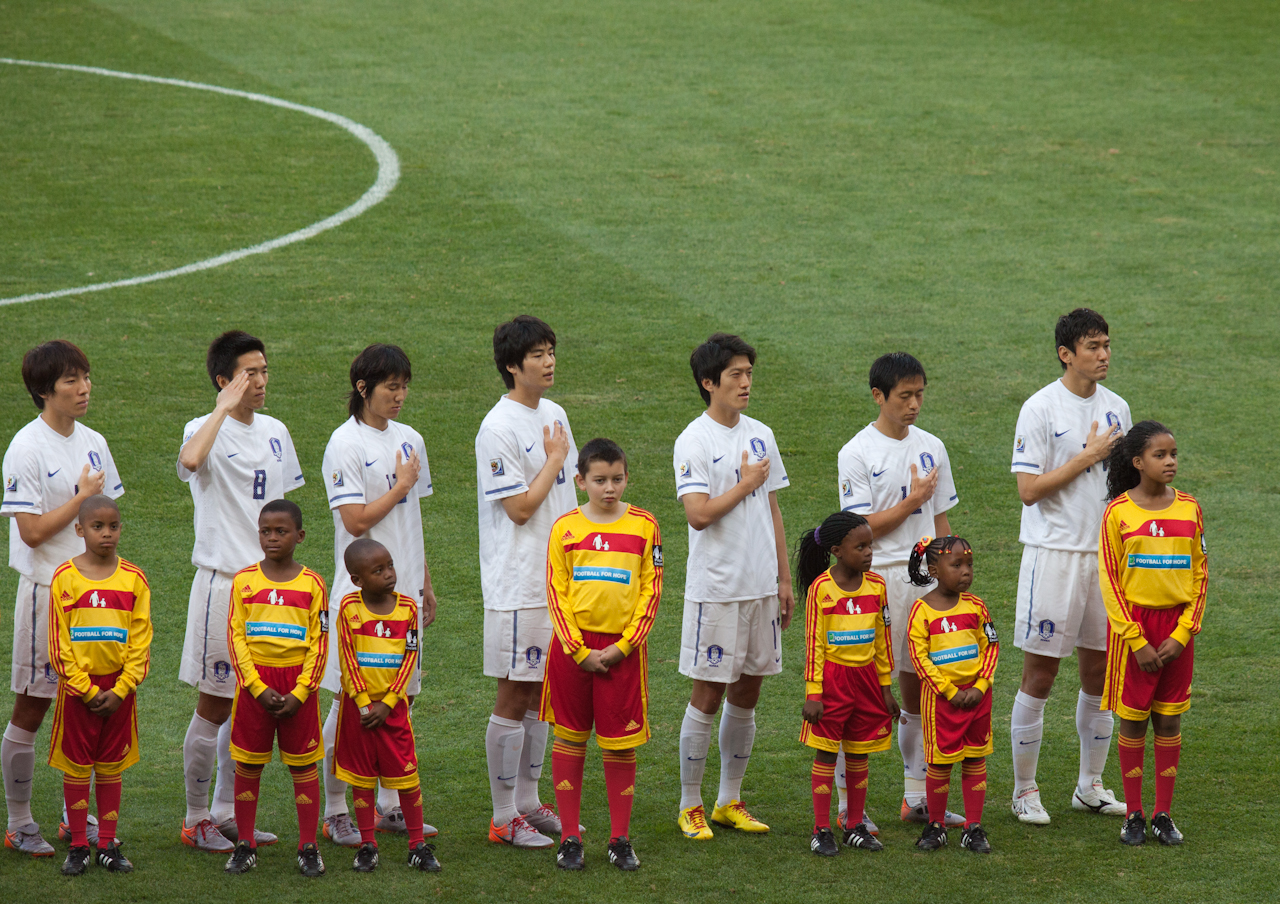
South Korean players saluting the national flag at the 2010 FIFA World Cup

In 2008, South Korea chose Hiddink's predecessor Huh Jung-moo as their manager again. Huh appointed Park Ji-sung, who got his international debut after being discovered by Huh in the past, as a new captain. Under Huh and Park, the South Korean team was undefeated for 27 consecutive games between 2008 and 2009. In the fourth round of the 2010 FIFA World Cup qualification, they recorded four wins and four draws without a loss against North Korea, Saudi Arabia, Iran and the United Arab Emirates.

At the 2010 FIFA World Cup in South Africa, they won their first game against Greece 2–0, with goals from Lee Jung-soo and Park Ji-sung. They then faced Argentina and suffered a 4–1 defeat, including an own goal by forward Park Chu-young. Their next result was a 2–2 draw in the match against Nigeria, with Lee Jung-soo and Park Chu-young scoring. This allowed them to make it to the knockout stage for the first time on foreign soil. In the round of 16 they met Uruguay, who took an early lead through Luis Suárez. South Korea equalized in the second half after Lee Chung-yong scored his second goal of the tournament but conceded to Suárez again in the 80th minute. Despite maintaining the majority of the possession in the second half, South Korea was unable to equalise again and were eliminated from the tournament.

=== Proactive football ===
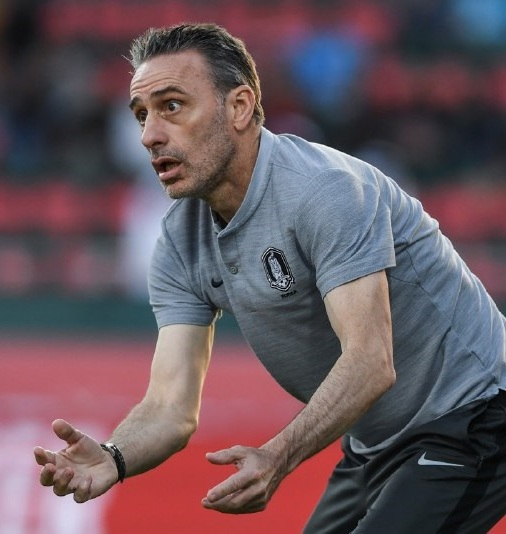
Paulo Bento was the longest-serving manager in South Korean national team history.

Kim Pan-gon, the KFA official in charge of finding a new manager, contracted Paulo Bento and his coaching team to set long-term goals after the 2018 FIFA World Cup. Bento showed a philosophy that wasn't dominated by the opposition's tactics and maintained his team's build-up play. However, South Korea had been familiar with reactive tactics that focus on defense. His style received negative assessments from a significant number of KFA's executives, and he came under fire from the South Korean media. Bento severed relations with the technical committee and managed the national team with only his coaching staff after Kim Pan-gon resigned from the association. Nevertheless, the national team players were attracted to his tactics and systematic training programs and strongly supported him.

Bento's team easily qualified for the 2022 FIFA World Cup in Qatar after scoring well against Asian teams, but the media still doubted that his proactive tactics would be effective against World Cup giants. Before the tournament, Son Heung-min, the Premier League Golden Boot winner and one of South Korea's key players, injured his eye socket and wasn't in optimal condition. At the World Cup, South Korea contested a goalless draw with Uruguay, and encountered a crisis after losing 3–2 to Ghana in the second match. Their defense failed to block all three of Ghana's shots on target, although their striker Cho Gue-sung scored two goals with headers. Bento was sent off for arguing with referee Anthony Taylor just after the match ended, and had to see South Korea's last group stage match against his homeland Portugal in the stands. However, South Korea defeated Portugal 2–1 with goals from Kim Young-gwon and Hwang Hee-chan, advancing to the knockout stage as Group H runners-up. Despite a 4–1 defeat to Brazil in the round of 16, the four-year challenge with Bento was finally appreciated by journalists and set a good direction for South Korean football.

== Reserve team ==
=== First world title ===
In August 1976, South Korean universities' national football team participated in the World University Football Championship, the football competition of the International University Sports Federation before the Universiade football was established. South Korea advanced to the knockout stage after defeating Brazil and Chile and drawing with France in the group stage. It also won against Senegal and the Netherlands in the quarter-finals and semi-finals respectively. In the final against Paraguay, South Korean forward Yoo Dong-choon scored the opening goal, but South Korea drew the first half after conceding a goal. During the second half, Cho Kwang-rae won a crucial penalty, and Paraguay gave up the match after two Paraguayan players who didn't accept the judgement were sent off for hitting the referee. This scene was a historic moment as South Korea won a world football competition for the first time, although it was not achieved in a professional tournament.

== Under-23 team ==
=== London Generation ===
Under manager Hong Myung-bo, the South Korean under-23 team participated at the 2012 Summer Olympics in London. In the group stage, South Korea qualified for the quarter-finals as runners-up of their group by beating Switzerland 2–1 and drawing with Mexico and Gabon in two goalless matches. In the quarter-finals, South Korea met hosts Great Britain. South Korean forward Ji Dong-won scored the opening goal, but British midfielder Aaron Ramsey scored a penalty equaliser. Ramsey once again had a penalty chance four minutes after his penalty goal, but South Korea's over-aged goalkeeper Jung Sung-ryong blocked it. However, Jung was injured in a collision with Micah Richards in the middle of the second half, and was replaced by Lee Bum-young. Nevertheless, Lee did not concede a goal until the end of extra time, and made a save from the shot of Britain's fifth kicker Daniel Sturridge in the penalty shoot-out. South Korea beat Great Britain 5–4 on penalties and Lee was praised by finishing the game successfully, but the compliments turned to criticisms after the semi-finals. He conceded three goals against Brazil, failing to perform his role. After being eliminated by a 3–0 loss to Brazil, South Korea competed with their historical rival Japan for a bronze medal. Their over-aged striker Park Chu-young scored the opening goal with a solo effort against three Japanese defenders, and Koo Ja-cheol scored an additional goal, a decisive one for the victory. South Korea won their first-ever medal in Olympic football after defeating Japan 2–0, and the medalists were exempted from mandatory military service according to the laws of the country. They were called the "London Generation" in South Korea, and most of them played for the senior team in the 2014 FIFA World Cup in Brazil, where they were eliminated after finishing last in their group.

== Under-20 team ==
=== Red Fury ===
South Korea's under-19 team, which finished third in the qualifying tournament, was initially ineligible to play in the final stage of the 1982 AFC Youth Championship. However, the North Korean FA was punished with a two-year suspension for assaulting a referee at the 1982 Asian Games by the Asian Football Confederation, so South Korea advanced to the final stage instead of North Korea, the runners-up. After winning the tournament, South Korea qualified for the 1983 FIFA World Youth Championship as Asian champions. Manager Park Jong-hwan trained his team with tactics that demanded a lot of endurance and teamwork for the World Youth Championship.

Drawn in a group with Scotland, Australia and the host Mexico, South Korea lost their first game against Scotland, but they advanced to the knockout stage by defeating the other two teams. In the quarter-finals, they faced Uruguay, and won the game 2–1 with two extra time goals by Shin Yon-ho. The news that they reached the semi-finals for the first time in a FIFA competition became a myth in South Korea, a weak country in sports at the time, although it was a youth competition. The foreign press was also interested in South Korea's achievement, describing it as the "Red Fury". South Korea finished the tournament in fourth place after losing to Brazil and Poland, and South Korean defender Kim Pan-keun was named in the official All-Star Team. The name of "Red Devils", the supporters' group for the South Korean national team, was inspired by this story.

=== Korean unified team ===
The Inter-Korean Sports Conferences were held on the recommendation of the International Olympic Committee since 1963, but the conferences always broke down until the 1980s because both sides had not seen eye to eye. In February 1991, however, they decided to make Korean unified teams in table tennis and football. In that same year, both South and North Korea qualified for the FIFA World Youth Championship as winners and runners-up of the 1990 AFC Youth Championship, so they urgently made allied under-20 football team for the world championship despite concerns about communication and teamwork. Their challenge was ended in the quarter-finals.

== Women's team ==
=== Early history ===
Less than a year after the government of the Republic of Korea was established in 1948, the first official women's football matches were held in Seoul on 28 and 29 June 1949, as a part of the National Girls' and Women's Sport Games. While women's basketball and volleyball won public recognition through the Games, football was seen as being unsuitable for women and unattractive to the public. As a result, the women's teams were disbanded soon after the event.

When women's football was officially adopted at the 1990 Asian Games in Beijing, the South Korean sports authorities decided to form a women's team with athletes from other sports and send the team to the Games. The result was defeat in all matches against Japan, North Korea, China and Chinese Taipei. Nevertheless, colleges and corporations started to launch women's football teams through the 1990s and the first annual national women's football event, the Queen's Cup, was held in 1993. When the 1999 FIFA Women's World Cup sparked interest worldwide, the South Korean ministry in charge of sports sponsored the foundation of new teams and tournaments for girls’ high school teams, university teams and company teams. To promote women's football, the Korea Women's Football Federation (KWFF) was established in March 2001, as an independent organization in association with the Korea Football Association (KFA).

=== World Cup debut ===
South Korea finished in third place at the 2003 AFC Women's Championship and qualified for the FIFA Women's World Cup for the first time. The Taegeuk Ladies were drawn in Group B with Norway, France and Brazil. Their first match played at the World Cup was a 3–0 loss to Brazil. They then lost 1–0 to France and 7–1 to Norway, with Kim Jin-hee scoring South Korea's first ever World Cup goal against the latter. They also won the inaugural EAFF Championship on home soil in 2005.

The notable talents in South Korea appeared in the late 2000s. They won the 2009 Summer Universiade and the 2010 FIFA U-17 Women's World Cup, as well as finishing third at the 2010 FIFA U-20 Women's World Cup. The number of Women's World Cup berths in Asia was increased from three to five in 2012, which saw South Korea qualify for the 2015 FIFA Women's World Cup as the fourth-placed team at the 2014 AFC Women's Asian Cup. They earned their first ever World Cup victory by defeating Spain 2–1 after a 2–0 loss to Brazil and a 2–2 draw with Costa Rica in Group E. They made it out of the group stage for the first time with the new generation, although losing 3–0 to France in the round of 16.

== See also ==
- Football in South Korea
- South Korea national football team
- South Korea national football B team
- South Korea national under-23 football team
- South Korea national under-20 football team
- South Korea women's national football team
- South Korea at the FIFA World Cup
- South Korea at the AFC Asian Cup
- South Korea at the CONCACAF Gold Cup
- South Korea at the FIFA Women's World Cup
