= List of Korea Cup winners =

This article is the list of national football cup champions in South Korea.

== History ==
The Korea Football Association (KFA) originally regarded the All Joseon Football Tournament, founded by the Joseon Sports Council in 1921, as the origin of the Korea Cup, but later changed the origin to All Joseon Football Championship founded by them in 1935. The All Joseon Championship was held until 1940 before being abolished by Japan, which entered World War II.

After the end of the Japanese occupation of Korea, the KFA operated two domestic cups contested by semi-professional clubs and university clubs. The two competitions were the Korean National Football Championship and the Korean President's Cup, and were annually held in autumn and spring respectively. (The President's Cup was not mentioned as a predecessor at first, but was later recognised by the KFA.)

Some semi-professional clubs converted their status into professional clubs following the establishment of the K League in 1983, and the KFA made an effort for the professional clubs' participations at the National Championship at the time, but it was fulfilled in only two editions (1988 and 1989). In 1996, the Korean FA Cup (renamed Korea Cup in 2024) was founded separately, starting to replace two semi-professional cups.

== Qualified teams ==
Club	All Joseon Championship	National Championship	President's Cup	Korea Cup
Fully professional club	—	1988–1989	—	1996–present
Semi-professional club Amateur club	1935–1940	1946–2000	1952–2009	1996–present
University club	1936–1940	1946–2000	1952–2009	1996–2019

== Champions by season ==
Season	Competition	Final		
Season	Competition	Champions	Score	Runners-up
1935	All Joseon Championship	Kyungsung FC (1)	1–0	Pyongyang FC
1936	All Joseon Championship	Bosung College (1)	1–0	Yonhi College
1937	All Joseon Championship	Bosung College (2)	6–1	Gyeongseong Medical College
1938	All Joseon Championship	Yonhi College (1)	6–4 (a.e.t.)	Bosung College
1939	All Joseon Championship	Bosung College (3)	1–0	Hamhung FC
1940	All Joseon Championship	Yonhi College (2)	1–0	Hamhung FC
1946	National Championship	Joil Brewery (1)	6–2	Seoul National University (Note: Commercial college of Seoul National University)
1948	National Championship	Yonhi University (3)	3–0	Sungkyunkwan University
1949	National Championship	Joseon Electrical Industry (1)	3–2	Yonhi University
1951	National Championship	Joseon Textile (1)	1–0	ROK Air Force
1952	President's Cup	ROK Army CIC (1)	Unknown	Joseon Textile
1952	National Championship	Joseon Textile (2)	4–0	ROK Military Police Command
1953	President's Cup	ROK Army CIC (2)	Unknown	Joseon Textile
1953	National Championship	ROK Army Quartermaster Corps (1)	2–0	ROK Marine Corps
1954	President's Cup	ROK Army HID (1)	4–1	Joseon Textile
1954	National Championship	ROK Military Police Command (1)	2–1	ROK Army CIC
1955	President's Cup	ROK Marine Corps (1)	2–1	ROK Army Quartermaster Corps
1956	President's Cup	ROK Army CIC (3)	Unknown	ROK Army Quartermaster Corps
1956	National Championship	ROK Army Quartermaster Corps (2)	Unknown	ROK Army OPMG
1957	President's Cup	ROK Army CIC (4)	2–0	ROK Army OPMG
1957	National Championship	ROK Army CIC (5)	Unknown	ROK Marine Corps
1958	President's Cup	Unknown	Unknown	Unknown
1958	National Championship	ROK Army Quartermaster Corps (3)	3–2 (a.e.t.)	ROK Army OPMG
1959	President's Cup	ROK Army CIC (6)	Unknown	ROK Marine Corps
1959	National Championship	ROK Army CIC (7)	Round-robin	ROK Marine Corps; ROK Army OPMG
1960	National Championship	Kyung Hee University (1)	1–0 (a.e.t.)	Korea Tungsten
1961	President's Cup	ROK Army CIC (8)	Awarded	Yonsei University
1961	National Championship	Kyung Hee University (2)	Unknown	ROK Army OPMG
1962	National Championship and President's Cup (Note: Combined tournament of National Championship and President's Cup)	Korea Electric Power (1)	1–0 (a.e.t.)	Korea Tungsten
1963	President's Cup	Cheil Industries (1)	2–0 (a.e.t.)	Seoul Police Department
1963	National Championship	Korea University (4)	1–1 (a.e.t.) (Note: Champions were decided by a draw.)	ROK Army Quartermaster Corps
1964	National Championship and President's Cup	Korea Coal Corporation (1)	3–2	Korea Electric Power
1965	President's Cup	Korea Tungsten (1)	Round-robin	ROK Army Quartermaster Corps
1965	National Championship	Korea Electric Power (2)	1–0	Keumsung Textile
1966	President's Cup	Korea Tungsten (2)	4–0	Seoul Police Department
1966	National Championship	Cheil Industries (2)	1–0	Chung-Ang University
1967	President's Cup	Cheil Industries (3)	2–1 (a.e.t.)	Korea Electric Power
1967	National Championship	Cheil Industries (4)	1–0	Korea Electric Power
1968	President's Cup	Yangzee (1)	2–2 (a.e.t.)	Cheil Industries
1968	President's Cup	Yangzee (1)	0–0 (a.e.t.)	Cheil Industries
1968	President's Cup	Yangzee (1)	1–0	Cheil Industries
1968	National Championship	Yangzee (2)	1–0 (a.e.t.)	Korea Tungsten
1969	President's Cup	ROK Marine Corps (2)	2–0	Yonsei University
1969	National Championship	ROK Army (1)	1–0	ROK Marine Corps
1970	President's Cup	Commercial Bank of Korea (1)	1–0	ROK Marine Corps
1970	National Championship	ROK Army (2)	0–0 (a.e.t.) (4–3 p)	Korea Housing Bank
1971	President's Cup	ROK Army (3)	2–0 (a.e.t.)	ROK Marine Corps
1971	National Championship	Korea University (5)	2–0	Korea Trust Bank
1972	President's Cup	Korea Housing Bank (1)	1–0	Korea Development Bank
1973	President's Cup	Kookmin Bank (1)	2–0	Commercial Bank of Korea
1973	National Championship	ROK Navy (3); Chohung Bank (1)	0–0 (a.e.t.)	—
1974	President's Cup	POSCO FC (1)	2–1	Sungkyunkwan University
1974	National Championship	Korea University (6)	Awarded	Yonsei University
1975	President's Cup	ROK Army (4)	1–0	Hanyang University
1975	National Championship	ROK Army (5)	1–0	Korea University
1976	President's Cup	Korea Automobile Insurance (1)	1–0	Korea University
1976	National Championship	Korea University (7)	2–1 (a.e.t.)	ROK Air Force
1977	President's Cup	Hanyang University (1)	2–1	Industrial Bank of Korea
1977	National Championship	Konkuk University (1)	2–0	POSCO FC
1978	President's Cup	Kyung Hee University (3)	1–0	ROK Navy
1978	National Championship	Kookmin Bank (2)	1–0	Chung-Ang University
1979	President's Cup	ROK Navy (4)	2–1	Korea University
1979	National Championship	ROK Army (6)	3–0	Myongji University
1980	President's Cup	Yonsei University (4)	2–0	ROK Army
1980	National Championship	Seoul City (1)	1–1 (a.e.t.)	Hanyang University
1980	National Championship	Seoul City (1)	1–1 (a.e.t.) (4–3 p)	Hanyang University
1981	President's Cup	Industrial Bank of Korea (1)	2–0	Daewoo FC
1981	National Championship	Konkuk University (2)	1–1 (a.e.t.)	Korea University
1981	National Championship	Konkuk University (2)	2–1	Korea University
1982	President's Cup	Korea University (8)	3–1	Kookmin Bank
1982	National Championship	Seoul City (2)	4–1	Korea Electric Power
1983	President's Cup	Kookmin Bank (3)	2–1 (a.e.t.)	Myongji University
1983	National Championship	Hanyang University (2)	2–0	Seoul Trust Bank
1984	President's Cup	Myongji University (1)	3–2	Sangmu FC
1984	National Championship	Yonsei University (5)	2–0	Chung-Ang University
1985	President's Cup	Seoul Trust Bank (1)	1–0	Sungkyunkwan University
1985	National Championship	Korea University (9)	2–0	POSCO Atoms B
1986	President's Cup	Kookmin Bank (4)	1–1 (a.e.t.) (4–1 p)	Commercial Bank of Korea
1986	National Championship	Seoul City (3)	3–1	Ajou University
1987	President's Cup	Myongji University (2)	2–1 (a.e.t.)	Kookmin Bank
1987	National Championship	Sungkyunkwan University (1)	2–1	Yonsei University
1988	President's Cup	Hallelujah FC (1)	0–0 (a.e.t.) (6–5 p)	Kookmin Bank
1988	National Championship (FA Cup)	Lucky-Goldstar Hwangso (1)	2–1	Daewoo Royals
1989	President's Cup	Yonsei University (6)	4–1	POSCO Atoms B
1989	National Championship (FA Cup)	Daewoo Royals (1)	1–0	Hyundai Horang-i
1989	National Championship (FA Cup)	Daewoo Royals (1)	1–1	Hyundai Horang-i
1990	President's Cup	Kookmin Bank (5)	1–0 (a.e.t.)	Hyundai Horang-i B
1990	National Championship	Daewoo Royals B (2)	3–2	Incheon National University
1991	President's Cup	Yeungnam University (1)	3–2	Kookmin Bank
1991	National Championship	Industrial Bank of Korea (2)	0–0 (a.e.t.) (4–2 p)	Hallelujah FC
1992	President's Cup	Korea Housing Bank (2)	1–0 (a.e.t.)	Hanil Bank
1992	National Championship	Hanyang University (3)	0–0 (a.e.t.) (3–2 p)	Daegu University
1993	President's Cup	Korea Housing Bank (3)	2–1	Korea Electric Power
1993	National Championship	Industrial Bank of Korea (3)	2–0	Daegu University
1994	President's Cup	E-Land Puma (1)	1–1 (a.e.t.) (4–2 p)	Hallelujah FC
1994	National Championship	E-Land Puma (2)	1–0	Hallelujah FC
1995	President's Cup	Kookmin Bank (6)	1–1 (a.e.t.) (4–2 p)	Korea Housing Bank
1995	National Championship	E-Land Puma (3)	2–1	Hallelujah FC
1996	Korea Cup (FA Cup)	Pohang Atoms (2)	0–0 (a.e.t.) (7–6 p)	Suwon Samsung Bluewings
1997	Korea Cup (FA Cup)	Jeonnam Dragons (1)	1–0	Cheonan Ilhwa Chunma
1998	Korea Cup (FA Cup)	Anyang LG Cheetahs (2)	2–1	Ulsan Hyundai Horang-i
1999	Korea Cup (FA Cup)	Cheonan Ilhwa Chunma (1)	3–0	Jeonbuk Hyundai Dinos
2000	Korea Cup (FA Cup)	Jeonbuk Hyundai Motors (1)	2–0	Seongnam Ilhwa Chunma
2001	Korea Cup (FA Cup)	Daejeon Citizen (1)	1–0	Pohang Steelers
2002	Korea Cup (FA Cup)	Suwon Samsung Bluewings (1)	1–0	Pohang Steelers
2003	Korea Cup (FA Cup)	Jeonbuk Hyundai Motors (2)	2–2 (a.e.t.) (4–2 p)	Jeonnam Dragons
2004	Korea Cup (FA Cup)	Busan I'Cons (3)	1–1 (a.e.t.) (4–3 p)	Bucheon SK
2005	Korea Cup (FA Cup)	Jeonbuk Hyundai Motors (3)	1–0	Hyundai Mipo Dockyard
2006	Korea Cup (FA Cup)	Jeonnam Dragons (2)	2–0	Suwon Samsung Bluewings
2007	Korea Cup (FA Cup)	Jeonnam Dragons (3)	3–2	Pohang Steelers
2007	Korea Cup (FA Cup)	Jeonnam Dragons (3)	3–1	Pohang Steelers
2008	Korea Cup (FA Cup)	Pohang Steelers (3)	2–0	Gyeongnam FC
2009	Korea Cup (FA Cup)	Suwon Samsung Bluewings (2)	1–1 (a.e.t.) (4–2 p)	Seongnam Ilhwa Chunma
2010	Korea Cup (FA Cup)	Suwon Samsung Bluewings (3)	1–0	Busan IPark
2011	Korea Cup (FA Cup)	Seongnam Ilhwa Chunma (2)	1–0	Suwon Samsung Bluewings
2012	Korea Cup (FA Cup)	Pohang Steelers (4)	1–0 (a.e.t.)	Gyeongnam FC
2013	Korea Cup (FA Cup)	Pohang Steelers (5)	1–1 (a.e.t.) (4–3 p)	Jeonbuk Hyundai Motors
2014	Korea Cup (FA Cup)	Seongnam FC (3)	0–0 (a.e.t.) (4–2 p)	FC Seoul
2015	Korea Cup (FA Cup)	FC Seoul (3)	3–1	Incheon United
2016	Korea Cup (FA Cup)	Suwon Samsung Bluewings (4)	2–1	FC Seoul
2016	Korea Cup (FA Cup)	Suwon Samsung Bluewings (4)	1–2 (a.e.t.) (10–9 p)	FC Seoul
2017	Korea Cup (FA Cup)	Ulsan Hyundai (1)	2–1	Busan IPark
2017	Korea Cup (FA Cup)	Ulsan Hyundai (1)	0–0	Busan IPark
2018	Korea Cup (FA Cup)	Daegu FC (1)	2–1	Ulsan Hyundai
2018	Korea Cup (FA Cup)	Daegu FC (1)	3–0	Ulsan Hyundai
2019	Korea Cup (FA Cup)	Suwon Samsung Bluewings (5)	0–0	Daejeon Korail
2019	Korea Cup (FA Cup)	Suwon Samsung Bluewings (5)	4–0	Daejeon Korail
2020	Korea Cup (FA Cup)	Jeonbuk Hyundai Motors (4)	1–1	Ulsan Hyundai
2020	Korea Cup (FA Cup)	Jeonbuk Hyundai Motors (4)	2–1	Ulsan Hyundai
2021	Korea Cup (FA Cup)	Jeonnam Dragons (4)	0–1	Daegu FC
2021	Korea Cup (FA Cup)	Jeonnam Dragons (4)	4–3 (a)	Daegu FC
2022	Korea Cup (FA Cup)	Jeonbuk Hyundai Motors (5)	2–2	FC Seoul
2022	Korea Cup (FA Cup)	Jeonbuk Hyundai Motors (5)	3–1	FC Seoul
2023	Korea Cup (FA Cup)	Pohang Steelers (6)	4–2	Jeonbuk Hyundai Motors
2024	Korea Cup	Pohang Steelers (7)	3–1 (a.e.t.)	Ulsan HD
2025	Korea Cup	Jeonbuk Hyundai Motors (6)	2–1 (a.e.t.)	Gwangju FC

== Statistics ==
=== All-time (since 1935) ===
==== Titles by club ====
In South Korea, Korea Cup era records are generally accepted. These all-time records are not mentioned generally.

Club	Champions	Runners-up	Seasons won
Korea University	9	5	1936, 1937, 1939, 1963, 1971, 1974, 1976, 1982, 1985
ROK Army CIC	8	1	1952, 1953, 1956, 1957 (2), 1959 (2), 1961
Pohang Steelers	7	6	1974, 1996, 2008, 2012, 2013, 2023, 2024
Yonsei University	6	6	1938, 1940, 1948, 1980, 1984, 1989
Kookmin Bank	6	4	1973, 1978, 1983, 1986, 1990, 1995
Jeonbuk Hyundai Motors	6	3	2000, 2003, 2005, 2020, 2022, 2025
ROK Army	6	1	1969, 1970, 1971, 1975 (2),1979
Suwon Samsung Bluewings	5	3	2002, 2009, 2010, 2016, 2019
ROK Navy	4	8	1955, 1969, 1973, 1979
Cheil Industries	4	1	1963, 1966, 1967 (2)
Jeonnam Dragons	4	1	1997, 2006, 2007, 2021
ROK Army Quartermaster Corps	3	4	1953, 1956, 1958
Busan IPark	3	4	1989, 1990, 2004
Seongnam FC	3	3	1999, 2011, 2014
FC Seoul	3	3	1988, 1998, 2015
Hanyang University	3	2	1977, 1983, 1992
Korea Housing Bank	3	2	1972, 1992, 1993
Industrial Bank of Korea	3	1	1981, 1991, 1993
Kyung Hee University	3	0	1960, 1961, 1978
Seoul City	3	0	1980, 1982, 1986
E-Land Puma	3	0	1994 (2), 1995
Korea Electric Power	2	5	1962, 1965
Joseon Textile	2	3	1951, 1952
Korea Tungsten	2	3	1965, 1966
Myongji University	2	2	1984, 1987
Yangzee	2	0	1968 (2)
Konkuk University	2	0	1977, 1981
ROK Army OPMG	1	6	1954
Ulsan HD	1	6	2017
Hallelujah FC	1	4	1988
Sungkyunkwan University	1	3	1987
Kyungsung FC	1	1	1935
Seoul Trust Bank	1	1	1985
Daegu FC	1	1	2018
Joil Brewery	1	0	1946
Joseon Electrical Industry	1	0	1949
ROK Army HID	1	0	1954
Korea Coal Corporation	1	0	1964
Chohung Bank	1	0	1973
Korea Automobile Insurance	1	0	1976
Yeungnam University	1	0	1991
Daejeon Citizen	1	0	2001

=== Korea Cup era (since 1996) ===
==== Titles by club ====
In accordance with the official K League policy, the current clubs inherit the history and records of the predecessor clubs.

Club	Champions	Runners-up	Seasons won
Pohang Steelers	6	3	1996, 2008, 2012, 2013, 2023, 2024
Jeonbuk Hyundai Motors	6	3	2000, 2003, 2005, 2020, 2022, 2025
Suwon Samsung Bluewings	5	3	2002, 2009, 2010, 2016, 2019
Jeonnam Dragons	4	1	1997, 2006, 2007, 2021
Seongnam FC	3	3	1999, 2011, 2014
FC Seoul	2	3	1998, 2015
Ulsan HD	1	4	2017
Busan IPark	1	2	2004
Daegu FC	1	1	2018
Daejeon Citizen	1	0	2001

==== Titles by city/province ====
City/Province	Titles	Club	Titles	Seasons won
Pohang	6	Pohang Atoms	1	1996
Pohang	6	Pohang Steelers	5	2008, 2012, 2013, 2023, 2024
Jeonbuk	6	Jeonbuk Hyundai Motors	6	2000, 2003, 2005, 2020, 2022, 2025
Suwon	5	Suwon Samsung Bluewings	5	2002, 2009, 2010, 2016, 2019
Jeonnam	4	Jeonnam Dragons	4	1997, 2006, 2007, 2021
Seongnam	2	Seongnam Ilhwa Chunma	1	2011
Seongnam	2	Seongnam FC	1	2014
Anyang	1	Anyang LG Cheetahs	1	1998
Busan	1	Busan I'Cons	1	2004
Cheonan	1	Cheonan Ilhwa Chunma	1	1999
Daegu	1	Daegu FC	1	2018
Daejeon	1	Daejeon Citizen	1	2001
Seoul	1	FC Seoul	1	2015
Ulsan	1	Ulsan Hyundai	1	2017

==== Titles by region ====
Region	Titles	City/Province	Titles
Honam region (Jeolla)	10	Jeonbuk	6
Honam region (Jeolla)	10	Jeonnam	4
Gyeonggi region (Seoul metropolitan area)	9	Suwon	5
Gyeonggi region (Seoul metropolitan area)	9	Seongnam	2
Gyeonggi region (Seoul metropolitan area)	9	Anyang	1
Gyeonggi region (Seoul metropolitan area)	9	Seoul	1
Yeongnam region (Gyeongsang)	9	Pohang	6
Yeongnam region (Gyeongsang)	9	Busan	1
Yeongnam region (Gyeongsang)	9	Daegu	1
Yeongnam region (Gyeongsang)	9	Ulsan	1
Hoseo region (Chungcheong)	2	Cheonan	1
Hoseo region (Chungcheong)	2	Daejeon	1

== See also ==
- Football in South Korea
- List of South Korean football champions
- Korean League Cup
