= Chung Jung-yong =

South Korean footballer

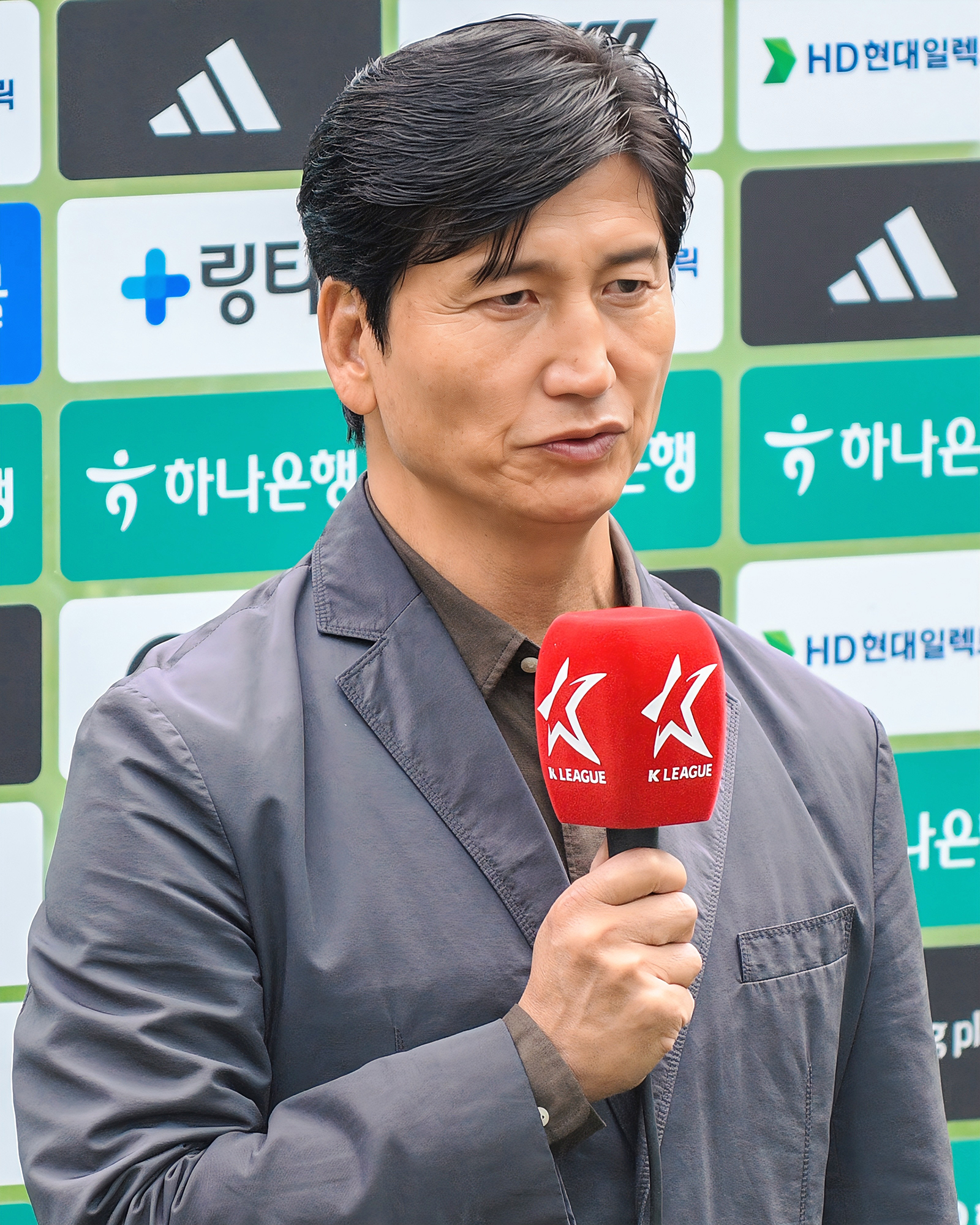
- Chung in 2026

Personal information
- Date of birth: 1 April 1969 (age 57)
- Place of birth: Daegu, South Korea
- Position: Centre-back

Team information
- Current team: Jeonbuk Hyundai Motors (head coach)

College career
Years	Team	Apps	(Gls)
1988–1992	Kyungil University		

Senior career*
Years	Team	Apps	(Gls)
1993–1997	E-Land Puma		

Managerial career
- 2012: South Korea U23 (caretaker)
- 2013: South Korea U17 (caretaker)
- 2016: South Korea U20 (caretaker)
- 2016: South Korea U17 (caretaker)
- 2017: South Korea U23 (caretaker)
- 2017–2019: South Korea U20
- 2020–2022: Seoul E-Land
- 2023–2025: Gimcheon Sangmu
- 2025–: Jeonbuk Hyundai Motors
Medal record
Men's football
Representing South Korea (as manager)
FIFA U-20 World Cup
Runner-up	2019 Poland
AFC U-19 Championship
Runner-up	2018 Indonesia
- * Club domestic league appearances and goals

Chung Jung-yong (Korean: 정정용, born 1 April 1969) is a South Korean association football manager and former player. He is currently a head coach of K League 1 club Jeonbuk Hyundai Motors.

== Honours ==
=== Player ===
E-Land Puma

- Korean National Semipro League (Spring): 1995, 1996
- Korean National Championship: 1994, 1995
- Korean National Semipro Championship: 1995
- Korean President's Cup: 1994

=== Manager ===
South Korea U20

- FIFA U-20 World Cup runner-up: 2019
- AFC U-19 Championship runner-up: 2018

Gimcheon Sangmu

- K League 2: 2023

Jeonbuk Hyundai Motors

- K League Super Cup: 2026

Individual

- AFC Coach of the Year: 2019
- Korean FA Coach of the Year: 2019
- K League Manager of the Month: October–December 2023
- K League All-Star: 2026
