= National Semi-professional Football League (South Korea) =

National Semipro Football League
- Founded: 1964
- Folded: 2002
- Country: South Korea
- Level on pyramid: 1 (1964–1982); 2–3 (1983); 2 (1984–2002)
- Domestic cup(s): National Championship; Korean FA Cup
- League cup: National Semipro Championship
- Most championships: Industrial Bank of Korea (11 titles)

The National Semi-professional Football League (Korean: 전국실업축구연맹전) was a football league contested between South Korean works teams, university teams and military teams from 1964 to 2002. It was the predecessor of the Korea National League founded in 2003.

== History ==
After the introduction of football from the UK navy in the late 19th century, football experienced a boom in Korea and many football clubs and school teams were formed in the 1910s. There were also many corporate football clubs especially in Seoul and Pyongyang, two big cities in Korea. The first corporate league appeared at Pyongyang's All Joseon Football Tournament in 1930, and Seoul Semi-professional Football League was founded in 1939, but both were stopped because of the Japanese government's policy during World War II. The Seoul League was reopened in 1949, but it was stopped again during the Korean War.

The National Semi-professional Football League was founded in 1964, and was the only football division in South Korea until 1982. It was divided into spring league and autumn league, being held twice a year except for four years in 1977 and 1982–1984 when it was held as a single league. It was mostly held in Seoul, where many headquarters of corporations were located. After South Korea's professional league, K League, was founded in 1983, the status of the Semipro League dropped to second division (but there was no promotion or relegation between them). It remained until 2002 before Korea National League was officially founded in 2003.

== Results ==
=== Champions by season ===
Season		Champions	Runners-up	Ref.
1964	Spring	Keumsung Textile; Cheil Industries	—	
1964	Autumn	Keumsung Textile	Korea Tungsten	
1965	Spring	Keumsung Textile; Korea Tungsten; Korea Electric Power	—	
1965	Autumn	Korea Tungsten	Korea Coal Corporation	
1966	Spring	Seoul Police Department	Korea Electric Power	
1966	Autumn	Korea Tungsten; Seoul Police Department	—	
1967	Spring	National Police Department	Ssangyong Cement	
1967	Autumn	Korea Electric Power	Cheil Industries	
1968	Spring	Korea Tungsten	Korea Electric Power	
1968	Autumn	Cheil Industries; ROK Army Quartermaster Corps	—	
1969	Spring	Korea Electric Power	Korea Tungsten	
1969	Autumn	Unknown (Note: There is an article about the second round of Autumn season, but no record after that. It might be stopped because of many international football matches.)		
1970	Spring	Cheil Industries	Korea Tungsten	
1970	Autumn	Chohung Bank	Korea Trust Bank	
1971	Spring	Korea Trust Bank	Korea Exchange Bank; Korea Housing Bank	
1971	Autumn	ROK Marine Corps	Korea Trust Bank; Chohung Bank	
1972	Spring	Korea Housing Bank	ROK Marine Corps	
1972	Autumn	Korea Housing Bank	ROK Marine Corps	
1973	Spring	ROK Marine Corps	Kookmin Bank	
1973	Autumn	Korea Trust Bank	ROK Army	
1974	Spring	Chohung Bank	ROK Army	
1974	Autumn	Commercial Bank of Korea; ROK Army	—	
1975	Spring	POSCO FC	ROK Army	
1975	Autumn	Industrial Bank of Korea	Korea Automobile Insurance	
1976	Spring	Korea Exchange Bank; Korea Trust Bank	—	
1976	Autumn	Ceased due to the schedule of the South Korea national team		
1977	—	ROK Army	POSCO FC	
1978	Spring	Seoul City; ROK Navy	—	
1978	Autumn	Korea Automobile Insurance	Seoul City	
1979	Spring	Industrial Bank of Korea	ROK Army	
1979	Autumn	Ceased due to the assassination of Park Chung Hee		
1980	Spring	Seoul City; ROK Army	—	
1980	Autumn	Korea Automobile Insurance; ROK Air Force	—	
1981	Spring	Daewoo FC	ROK Navy	
1981	Autumn	POSCO FC	ROK Army	
1982	—	POSCO FC	Kookmin Bank	
1983	—	Hanil Bank	ROK Army	
1984	—	Sangmu FC	Korea Housing Bank	
1985	Spring	Industrial Bank of Korea	Kookmin Bank	
1985	Autumn	Seoul City	Seoul Trust Bank	
1986	Spring	Korea Housing Bank	Hyundai Motor Company	
1986	Autumn	POSCO Atoms B	Hallelujah FC	
1987	Spring	Hanil Bank	Hallelujah FC	
1987	Autumn	Kookmin Bank	Sangmu FC	
1988	Spring	Seoul City	Industrial Bank of Korea	
1988	Autumn	POSCO Atoms B	Commercial Bank of Korea	
1989	Spring	Industrial Bank of Korea	POSCO Atoms B	
1989	Autumn	Seoul City	Korea First Bank	
1990	Spring	Industrial Bank of Korea	Korea Housing Bank	
1990	Autumn	Industrial Bank of Korea; Hallelujah FC	—	
1991	Spring	Industrial Bank of Korea	Hallelujah FC	
1991	Autumn	Sangmu FC	Kookmin Bank	
1992	Spring	Sangmu FC	Hallelujah FC	
1992	Autumn	Industrial Bank of Korea	Korea Electric Power	
1993	Spring	Hallelujah FC	Sangmu FC	
1993	Autumn	Korea Electric Power	Hallelujah FC	
1994	Spring	Sangmu FC	Industrial Bank of Korea	
1994	Autumn	Industrial Bank of Korea	Korea Housing Bank	
1995	Spring	E-Land Puma	Hallelujah FC	
1995	Autumn	Industrial Bank of Korea	Korea Railroad	
1996	Spring	E-Land Puma	Kookmin Bank	
1996	Autumn	Sangmu FC	Korea Electric Power	
1997	Spring	Industrial Bank of Korea	E-Land Puma	
1997	Autumn	Sangmu FC	Hanil Life Insurance	
1998	Spring	Korea Housing Bank	Hanil Life Insurance	
1998	Autumn	Sangmu FC	Korean Police	
1999	Spring	Hyundai Mipo Dockyard	Sangmu FC	
1999	Autumn	Sangmu FC	Korea Railroad	
2000	Spring	Korea Railroad	Sangmu FC	
2000	Autumn	Hyundai Mipo Dockyard	Gangneung City	
2001	Spring	Kookmin Bank	Korean Police	
2001	Autumn	Hyundai Mipo Dockyard	Korean Police	
2002	Spring	Sangmu FC	Hyundai Mipo Dockyard	
2002	Autumn	Korean Police	Gangneung City	

=== Titles by club ===
Club	Titles	Seasons won
Industrial Bank of Korea	11	1975, 1979, 1985, 1989, 1990 (2), 1991, 1992, 1994, 1995, 1997
Sangmu FC	9	1984, 1991, 1992, 1994, 1996, 1997, 1998, 1999, 2002
POSCO Atoms	5	1975, 1981, 1982, 1986, 1988
Seoul City	5	1978, 1980, 1985, 1988, 1989
Korea Tungsten	4	1965 (2), 1966, 1968
Korea Electric Power	4	1965, 1967, 1969, 1993
Korea Housing Bank	4	1972 (2), 1986, 1998
Keumsung Textile	3	1964 (2), 1965
National Police Department	3	1966 (2), 1967
Cheil Industries	3	1964, 1968, 1970
Korea Trust Bank	3	1971, 1973, 1976
ROK Navy	3	1971, 1973, 1978
ROK Army	3	1974, 1977, 1980
Hyundai Mipo Dockyard	3	1999, 2000, 2001
Chohung Bank	2	1970, 1974
Korea Automobile Insurance	2	1978, 1980
Hanil Bank	2	1983, 1987
Hallelujah FC	2	1990, 1993
E-Land Puma	2	1995, 1996
Kookmin Bank	2	1987, 2001
ROK Army Quartermasters	1	1968
Commercial Bank of Korea	1	1974
Korea Exchange Bank	1	1976
ROK Air Force	1	1980
Daewoo FC	1	1981
Korea Railroad	1	2000
Korean Police	1	2002

== Awards ==
Season		Best player	Top goalscorer	Best Manager	Ref.
1972	Spring	Unknown	Kim Jae-han (Korea Housing Bank, 8 goals)	Unknown	
1972	Autumn	Unknown	Unknown	Unknown	
1973	Spring	Unknown	Unknown	Unknown	
1973	Autumn	Jeong Kang-ji (Korea Trust Bank)	Choi Nak-seon (Korea Trust Bank, 3 goals)	Seo Yoon-chan (Korea Trust Bank)	
1974	Spring	Jeong Dong-hwan (Chohung Bank)	Jang Chang-ho (Chohung Bank, unknown)	Yoo Hyun-cheol (Korea Electric Power)	
1974	Autumn	Han Woong-soo (Commercial Bank of Korea)	Shin Dong-min (ROK Army, 9 goals)	Sung Nak-woon (ROK Army)	
1975	Spring	Lee Yi-woo (Korea Automobile Insurance)	Park Su-deok (Industrial Bank of Korea, 11 goals)	Han Hong-ki (POSCO FC)	
1975	Autumn	Kim Jin-kook (Industrial Bank of Korea)	Jo In-jae (Korea Automobile Insurance, 7 goals)	Kang Chan-woo (Industrial Bank of Korea)	
1976	Spring	Cha Bum-kun (Korea Trust Bank)	Yoon Young-woon (Korea Trust Bank, 5 goals)	Kim Kyu-hwan (Korea Exchange Bank); Lee Se-yeon (Korea Trust Bank)	
1977	—	Baek Joong-cheol (ROK Army)	Yoo Geon-soo (POSCO FC, 12 goals)	Sung Nak-woon (ROK Army)	
1978	Spring	Son Jong-seok (Seoul City)	Park Dae-je (Seoul City, 5 goals); Lee Gwang-seon (ROK Navy, 5 goals)	Park Jong-hwan (Seoul City; Park Se-hak (ROK Navy)	
1978	Autumn	Lee Kang-jo (Korea Automobile Insurance)	Not awarded (Note: Park Byung-chul (ROK Navy), Lee Kang-min (Korea Automobile Insurance) and Shin Dong-min (NongHyup FC) became joint-top goalscorers with three goals each, but the award was not presented officially.)	Moon Jung-sik (Korea Automobile Insurance)	
1979	Spring	Seo Deok-man (Industrial Bank of Korea)	Unknown	Choi Gil-soo (Industrial Bank of Korea)	
1980	Spring	Park Chang-sun (ROK Army)	Lee Tae-yeop (Seoul City, 5 goals)	Sung Nak-woon (ROK Army); Park Jong-hwan (Seoul City)	
1980	Autumn	Moon Da-yong (Korea Automobile Insurance); Jin Jang-sang-gon (ROK Air Force)	Choo Jong-soo (Korea Automobile Insurance, 3 goals); Yoo Jae-heung (NongHyup FC, 3 goals)	Huh Yoon-jung (ROK Air Force)	
1981	Spring	Choi Gyeong-sik (Daewoo FC)	Kang Sang-gil (Korea Housing Bank, 5 goals)	Chang Woon-soo (Daewoo FC)	
1981	Autumn	Kim Chul-soo (POSCO FC)	Lee Jung-il (Commercial Bank of Korea, 4 goals); Park Chang-sun (POSCO FC, 4 goals); Ha Deok-yoon (ROK Army, 4 goals)	Cho Yoon-ok (POSCO FC)	
1982	—	Park Chang-sun (POSCO FC)	Lee Tae-yeop (Seoul City, 13 goals)	Park Soo-il (POSCO FC)	
1983	—	Unknown	Wang Sun-jae (Hanil Bank, 6 goals)	Unknown	
1984	—	Han Young-soo (Sangmu FC)	Moon Min-ho (Sangmu FC, 6 goals)	Kim Young-bai (Sangmu FC)	
1985	Spring	Sim Gyo-bong (Industrial Bank of Korea)	Gu Han-sik (Seoul City, 5 goals)	Choi Gil-soo (Industrial Bank of Korea)	
1985	Autumn	Lee Chil-seong (Seoul City)	Unknown	Unknown	
1986	Spring	Unknown	Jeong Jeong-hwa (Hyundai Motor Company, 4 goals)	Unknown	
1986	Autumn	Unknown	Unknown	Unknown	
1987	Spring	Hwang Seok-keun (Hanil Bank)	Oh Seok-jae (Hallelujah FC, 6 goals)	Kim Ho (Hanil Bank)	
1987	Autumn	Kang Man-young (Kookmin Bank)	Unknown	Gil Gi-cheol (Kookmin Bank)	
1988	Spring	Go Tae-il (Seoul City)	Kim Young-joo (Seoul City, 5 goals)	Park Jong-hwan (Seoul City)	
1988	Autumn	Park Seok-ho (POSCO Atoms B)	Oh Seok-jae (Hallelujah FC, 3 goals)	Unknown	
1989	Spring	Oh Hee-cheon (Industrial Bank of Korea)	Lee Hyun-taek (Korea First Bank, 6 goals)	Choi Gil-soo (Industrial Bank of Korea)	
1989	Autumn	Heo Man-yeol (Seoul City)	Unknown	Kim Soo-deok (Seoul City)	
1990	Spring	Park Guk-chang (Industrial Bank of Korea)	Lee Jae-goon (Sangmu FC, 6 goals)	Choi Gil-soo (Industrial Bank of Korea)	
1990	Autumn	Choi Hong-sik (Hallelujah FC)	Byeon Il-woo (Hallelujah FC, 4 goals)	Unknown	
1991	Spring	Yoo Jin-hoe (Industrial Bank of Korea)	Seo Hyo-won (Industrial Bank of Korea, 7 goals)	Choi Gil-soo (Industrial Bank of Korea)	
1991	Autumn	Kim Byung-ji (Sangmu FC)	Kim Yong-ho (Sangmu FC, 4 goals)	Lee Kang-jo (Sangmu FC)	
1992	Spring	Shin Seong-hwan (Sangmu FC)	Hyeon Il-gwon (Samick FC, 5 goals)	Lee Kang-jo (Sangmu FC)	
1992	Autumn	Oh Se-eung (Industrial Bank of Korea)	Choi Dong-sik (Industrial Bank of Korea, 5 goals)	Choi Gil-soo (Industrial Bank of Korea)	
1993	Spring	Hwang Deuk-ha (Hallelujah FC)	Kim In-wan (Korea Electric Power, 4 goals)	Hwang Jae-man (Hallelujah FC)	
1993	Autumn	Choi Cheol-soo (Korea Electric Power)	Choi Dong-sik (Industrial Bank of Korea, 5 goals)	Yoo Hyun-cheol (Korea Electric Power)	
1994	Spring	Hwang Gyu-joon (Sangmu FC)	Kim Do-hoon (Sangmu FC, 3 goals); Lee Jae-goon (Industrial Bank of Korea, 3 goals)	Unknown	
1994	Autumn	Kim Nam-il (Industrial Bank of Korea)	Choi Dong-sik (Industrial Bank of Korea, 5 goals)	Unknown	
1995	Spring	Lee Gwang-cheol (E-Land Puma)	Lee Gwang-jin (Korea Railroad, 5 goals)	Unknown	
1995	Autumn	Park Doo-jeong (Industrial Bank of Korea)	Lee Gwang-jin (Korea Railroad, 6 goals)	Unknown	
1996	Spring	Je Yong-sam (E-Land Puma)	Oh Hyun-seok (Korea Electric Power, unknown)	Unknown	
1996	Autumn	Jeong Gwang-seok (Sangmu FC)	Oh Hyun-seok (Korea Electric Power, 7 goals)	Unknown	
1997	Spring	Yoo Jin-hoe (Industrial Bank of Korea)	Lee Woo-hyung (Kookmin Bank, 5 goals)	Unknown	
1997	Autumn	Park Nam-yeol (Sangmu FC)	Park Nam-yeol (Sangmu FC, 4 goals)	Lee Kang-jo (Sangmu FC)	
1998	Spring	Lee Soo-jae (Korea Housing Bank)	Ko Myung-gwon (Seoul City, 3 goals)	Unknown	
1998	Autumn	Park Chul (Sangmu FC)	Choi Yong-soo (Sangmu FC, 5 goals); Park Jong-gwan (Immanuel FC, 5 goals)	Unknown	
1999	Spring	Kim Dae-eui (Hyundai Mipo Dockyard)	Song Hong-seop (Suwon Samsung Bluewings B, unknown); Jang Min-seok (Jeonbuk Hyundai Dinos B, unknown)	Unknown	
1999	Autumn	Kim Gi-jong (Sangmu FC)	Lee Gwang-jin (Korea Railroad, unknown)	Unknown	
2000	Spring	Oh Jong-ryeol (Korea Railroad)	Kim Young-gi (Hyundai Mipo Dockyard, 6 goals)	Unknown	
2000	Autumn	Lee Gwang-cheol (Hyundai Mipo Dockyard)	Song Hong-seop (Hummel Korea, 4 goals)	Unknown	
2001	Spring	Kim Dong-joo (Kookmin Bank)	Baek Seung-woo (Kookmin Bank, 3 goals)	Unknown	
2001	Autumn	Kim Joon-hyup (Hyundai Mipo Dockyard)	Kim Joon-hyup (Hyundai Mipo Dockyard, 4 goals); Lee Seong-gil (Hallelujah FC (1999), 4 goals)	Unknown	
2002	Spring	Seo Ki-bok (Sangmu FC)	Lee Seong-rak (Hyundai Mipo Dockyard, 3 goals)	Lee Kang-jo (Sangmu FC)	
2002	Autumn	Kwon Dae-joon (Korean Police)	Ko Bong-hyun (Hyundai Mipo Dockyard, unknown)	Unknown	

== See also ==
- Korean National Football Championship
- Korean President's Cup
- National Semi-professional Football Championship (South Korea)
- Korea National League
- South Korean football league system
- List of South Korean football champions
