= Park Jong-hwan (footballer) =

South Korean football manager (1938–2023)

Personal information
- Date of birth: 9 February 1936
- Place of birth: Ongjin, Chūseinan-dō, Korea, Empire of Japan
- Date of death: 7 October 2023 (aged 87)
- Place of death: Seoul, South Korea
- Height: 1.71 m (5 ft 7 in)
- Position: Right-back

College career
Years	Team	Apps	(Gls)
1960–?	Kyung Hee University		

Senior career*
Years	Team	Apps	(Gls)
?–1965	Korea Tungsten		

International career
1960–1961	South Korea U20		
1962	South Korea B		

Managerial career
- 1976–1988: Seoul City
- 1980–1983: South Korea U20
- 1983: South Korea B
- 1983–1984: South Korea
- 1984–1986: South Korea B
- 1986–1988: South Korea
- 1988–1996: Ilhwa Chunma
- 1990: South Korea
- 1995: South Korea
- 1996: South Korea
- 1998: Wuhan Hongjinlong
- 2002–2006: Daegu FC
- 2014: Seongnam FC
Medal record
Men's football
Representing South Korea (as player)
AFC Youth Championship
Winner	1960 Malaya
Representing South Korea (as manager)
Asian Games
Bronze medal – third place	1990 Beijing
AFC Youth Championship
Winner	1980 Thailand
Winner	1982 Thailand
- * Club domestic league appearances and goals

Park Jong-hwan (Korean: 박종환; 9 February 1936 – 7 October 2023) was a South Korean football manager.

== Managerial career ==
Regarded as one of South Korea's greatest football managers of the 20th century, Park led the South Korean under-20 team to the semi-finals in the 1983 FIFA World Youth Championship, and guided Ilhwa Chunma to three consecutive K League titles from 1993 to 1995. He achieved these memorable results by implementing various tactics under players' great teamwork. However, he was also criticised for his oppressive style and violence against players, which earned him the nickname "Bat Park".

== Death ==
Park died in Seoul on 7 October 2023, at the age of 85.

== Honours ==
=== Player ===
South Korea U20

- AFC Youth Championship: 1960

=== Manager ===
Seoul City

- Korean National Semipro League (Spring): 1978, 1980, 1988
- Korean National Semipro League (Autumn): 1985
- Korean National Championship: 1980, 1982, 1986

South Korea U20

- AFC Youth Championship: 1980, 1982

South Korea

- Asian Games bronze medal: 1990

Ilhwa Chunma

- K League 1: 1993, 1994, 1995
- Korean League Cup: 1992
- Asian Club Championship: 1995

Individual

- Korean National Semipro League (Spring) Best Manager: 1978, 1980
- Korean National Championship Best Manager: 1980, 1982
- K League All-Star: 1991
- K League 1 Manager of the Year: 1993, 1994, 1995
- AFC Coach of the Year: 1995
