= 1999 National Semi-professional Football League (South Korea) =

National Semipro Football League
- Season: 1999
- Dates: Spring: 8–23 April 1999; Autumn: 2–16 September 1999
- Champions: Spring: Hyundai Mipo Dockyard (1st title); Autumn: Sangmu FC (8th title)
- Best Player: Spring: Kim Dae-eui; Autumn: Kim Gi-jong
- Top goalscorer: Spring: Song Hong-seop; Jang Min-seok; Autumn: Lee Gwang-jin

The 1999 National Semi-professional Football League (Korean: 1999년 전국실업축구연맹전) was the thirty-sixth season of the National Semi-professional Football League (South Korea).

== Spring season ==
=== Group stage ===
==== Group 1 ====
Pos	Team	Pld	W	D	L	Pts	Qualification
1	Hyundai Mipo Dockyard	4	3	0	1	9	Advance to knockout stage
2	Sangmu FC	4	3	0	1	9	Advance to knockout stage
3	Pohang Steelers B	4	2	1	1	7	
4	Cheonan Ilhwa Chunma B	4	0	2	2	2	
5	Seoul City	4	0	1	3	1	

Source: Report

==== Group 2 ====
Pos	Team	Pld	W	D	L	Pts	Qualification
1	Suwon Samsung Bluewings B	4	3	0	1	9	Advance to knockout stage
2	Korean Police	4	3	0	1	9	Advance to knockout stage
3	Jeonbuk Hyundai Dinos B	5	2	1	2	7	
4	Ulsan Hyundai Horang-i B	4	1	2	1	5	
5	Korea Railroad	5	1	1	3	4	
6	Hallelujah FC (1999)	4	1	0	3	3	

Source: Report

=== Knockout stage ===
==== Semi-finals ====
20 April 1999

Sangmu FC	2–0	Suwon Samsung Bluewings B
Kang Dae-hee 1', 4'	Report

Dongdaemun Stadium, Seoul

20 April 1999

Hyundai Mipo Dockyard	1–0	Korean Police
Lee Yoon-tae 58'	Report

Dongdaemun Stadium, Seoul

==== Final ====
23 April 1999

Sangmu FC	1–2	Hyundai Mipo Dockyard
Cheon Dae-won 6' (o.g.)	Report	Ahn Sun-jin 10' (pen.); Kim Dae-eui 60'

Dongdaemun Stadium, Seoul

== Autumn season ==
=== Group stage ===
The press at the time reported only part of the competition.

==== Group 1 ====
Home \ Away	SAN	CGM	ALC
Sangmu FC	—		
Cheonggu Marines		—	4–2
Anyang LG Cheetahs B		2–4	—

==== Group 2 ====
Home \ Away	HMD	CIC	HAL	SSB
Hyundai Mipo Dockyard	—	2–2		
Cheonan Ilhwa Chunma B	2–2	—		
Hallelujah FC (1999)			—	3–1
Suwon Samsung Bluewings B			1–3	—

==== Group 3 ====
Home \ Away	JHD	SEO
Jeonbuk Hyundai Dinos B	—	1–1
Seoul City	1–1	—

==== Group 4 ====
Home \ Away	KOR	POH	UHH
Korea Railroad	—	2–0	3–1
Pohang Steelers B	0–2	—	
Ulsan Hyundai Horang-i B	1–3		—

=== Knockout stage ===
==== Semi-finals ====
14 September 1999

Sangmu FC	2–1	Hyundai Mipo Dockyard
Kim Hyun-su 55'; Park Choong-kyun 79'	Report	? 69'

Mokdong Stadium, Seoul

14 September 1999

Korea Railroad	3–2	Jeonbuk Hyundai Dinos B
Oh Jong-youl (?); Lee Gwang-jin (?); Kim Kwang-ho (?)	Report	? (?); ? (?)

Mokdong Stadium, Seoul

==== Final ====
16 September 1999

Sangmu FC	1–1 (a.e.t.)	Korea Railroad
Kim Gi-jong 17'	Report	Heo Se-kyu 5'
Penalties
	4–3

Mokdong Stadium, Seoul

== See also ==
- 1999 in South Korean football
- 1999 Korean FA Cup
