= Noh Heung-seop =

South Korean footballer and manager (born 1947)

Noh Heung-seop 노흥섭
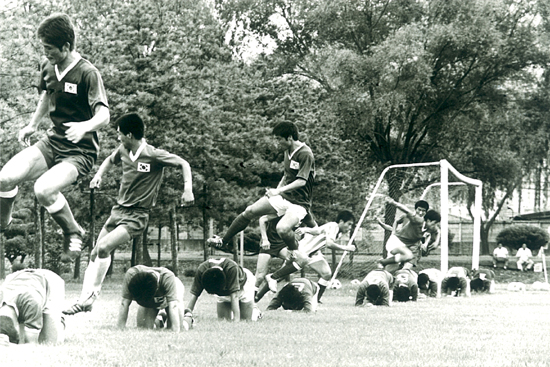
- Noh training with South Korea during the early 1970s.

Personal information
- Full name: Noh Heung-seop
- Date of birth: February 13, 1947 (age 79)
- Place of birth: Jinju, South Gyeongsang, South Korea
- Position: Defensive midfielder

Youth career
- 1966: Dongbuk High School
- 1966–1968: Hosei University

Senior career*
Years	Team	Apps	(Gls)
1969–1970	Kookmin Bank		
1971–1973	→ ROK Marine Corps (draft)		
1974–1978	Kookmin Bank		

International career
1966–1968	South Korea U20		
1968–1978	South Korea		

Managerial career
- 1978–1984: Kookmin Bank
Medal record
Men's football
Representing South Korea
AFC Asian Cup
Silver medal – second place	1972 Thailand	Team
- * Club domestic league appearances and goals

- Noh Heung-seop
- Hangul: 노흥섭
- Hanja: 盧興燮
- RR: No Heungseop
- MR: No Hŭngsŏp

Noh Heung-seop (Korean: 노흥섭; Hanja: 盧興燮, born February 13, 1947) is a South Korean former footballer, manager and accountant. He played for Kookmin Bank throughout the 1970s to where he was named the best player of the 1978 Korean National Football Championship. He also represented his home country internationally in the 1972 AFC Asian Cup, reaching runners-up. He also served as Vice President of the Korea Football Association throughout his later career as manager.

== Club career ==
Noh was born on February 13, 1947, at Jinju, South Gyeongsang. Noh attended high school at Dongbuk High School until his graduation in 1966 where he would graduate alongside fellow South Korean footballers Kim Jae-han and Heo Seung-pyo. From there, he would be successfully admitted at Hosei University based in Tokyo. He would continue to play for Hosei until the 1968 season. With the foundation of Kookmin Bank FC for the Autumn 1969 season, Noh would be a part of the club's very first roster. In the 1971 season, Noh would be conscripted to play for the Korea Marine Corps as he would play in the club's first ever victory in a domestic cup. He would continue to play for the Marine Corps in 1972 but would be discharged from military service on May 19, 1973, where he would then return to play for Kookmin Bank for the remainder of the season from recommendation and would continue to play for the club in the 1974 season. In 1977, Noh would still play for Kookmin Bank but would accidentally score an own goal in a match against First Bank. During the 1978 Korean National Football Championship, Kookmin Bank would reach the finals and would later reign as champions for that season with Noh being awarded the title of the best player of the team that year with this being his final season as a player.

== International career ==
Noh would first be listed in several preliminary rosters to play for the 1966 AFC Youth Championship held in the Philippines while he was still playing for Dongbuk. Later on, he would make the final roster for the 1967 edition. Noh would subsequently play in the match against Indonesia where he would injure his knee in the match and had to be replaced with the match ending in a 3–0 loss for South Korea against the Merah Putih. A year later, he would be called up to play in the 1968 Merdeka Tournament. After an international absence in 1970, he would be called up to play for the 1971 Far East Football Tournament sanctioned by the International Military Sports Council. During the tournament, he would play in the opening game against South Vietnam on June 7. Later that year, Noh would be selected as part of a preliminary squad for the upcoming 1974 FIFA World Cup qualifiers. Following South Korea's failure to qualify for the 1972 Summer Olympics, Noh would play for the reserve team against the youth team as part of an examination match where it would result in a 4–1 victory. Noh would be selected to play for the 1972 AFC Asian Cup as part of its final squad and although he wouldn't play in any matches, he would appear as a reserve in the final against Iran where South Korea would lose and be runners-up in the tournament.

After three years of dormancy from international football, Noh would return to play for South Korea after a minor restructure. In the following year, he would play in the 1978 FIFA World Cup qualifiers. Noh would also be praised as an exemplary player despite the rough performance of South Korea throughout their participation in 1978.

== Managerial career ==
Following his career as an active player, he would return to football four years later in the form of becoming the coach of Kookmin Bank in the same season in 1978 and would oversee the team going on to win the 1982 Korean President's Cup National Football Tournament. He would also represent the club as part of its delegation within South Korea for the 1982 Merdeka Tournament. He would continue to remain coach for the 1983 K League, becoming one of five initial coaches for the new league as well as the youngest coach at the mere age of 37. Noh's charisma and emphasis on teamwork would be cited as a beacon of mental strength for the players of the club throughout the season. He would also be noted for imploring unconventional strategies such as occasionally having starting lineups be mostly consisting of substitute players which would result in Kookmin Bank winning the 1983 Korean President's Cup National Football Tournament. During the 1983 K League, Noh would primarily emphasize in his players playing with physical strength and relying on players such as Lee Tae-hee, Lee Tae-yeop and Kim Su-gil to score goals from a middle range. Despite this though, Kookmin Bank suffered from a lack of solid defensive players which would contribute to serious losses for the team. Around the end of the season however, Noh would be replaced with former manager of Incheon National University Lim Chang-soo. Noh was then promoted to assistant director of Kookmin Bank. A few days later, he was made deputy director of the club. Following the disappointing performance of the club, in the following 1984 K League, Noh would reinforce Lim Chang-so's decision to replace around 10 players for the upcoming 1984 K League despite doubts over the club's upcoming performance. Despite this though, an internal rupture would occur between the two following the club's disappointing results to escape last place with Noh briefly assuming coaching responsibilities while now being vice manager of the club. By 1990, Noh would once again be the head coach of Kookmin Bank as part of the club's new management. He would then be made an auditor for the Korea Business Football Federation on March 7, 1992. On January 27, 1993, he would then be made a director of the Korea Football Association. In the same year, he'd also become the manager of the Doksan-dong branch of Kookmin Bank. He would remain in the company as an office manager in 1994 and was made vice chairman in 1998.

On January 18, 2004, Noh would be made executive director of the Korea Football Association following the resignation of Cho Jung-yeon. He would then selected as the general manager of Ulsan Hyundai Mipo Dockyard on January 4, 2006. By 2009, he was director of the Korea Football Association who would promote revitalization efforts to improve youth football within South Korea in response to the recent successes of Japan. Noh was then elected as vice president of the Korea Football Association by 2010, overseeing the South Korean squad in the 2010 FIFA World Cup beginning on March 31. He was then elected as becoming the new president of the Chung-Ang University Central Friendship Athletic Association in 2011. During his time as vice president, he would also attend the inaugural celebration of the creation of Gimpo Citizen in 2013. Following the resignation of Kim Hwi from the Korea Youth Football Federation, Noh was named acting president and would serve the remainder of Kim's term until December 2016. Throughout his tenure as president, he would be criticized for hastily hosting the annual National Youth Soccer Tournament due to misleading titles regarding the official status of matches as well as poor scheduling. On December 23, 2019, Jinju Citizen FC would officially be established with Noh attending the founding ceremony of the club. Noh, Cha Bum-kun, Lee Hoe-taik and Kim Jae-han would all reunite in 2021 to celebrate the recent successes of Son Heung-min at Tottenham Hotspur and the increasing reputation of Korean football that year.
