= Korean President's Cup National Football Tournament =

President's Cup
- Organiser(s): Korea Football Association
- Founded: 1952
- Abolished: 2010
- Region: South Korea
- Related competitions: Korea Cup
- Most championships: ROK Army CIC; Goyang KB Kookmin Bank; Korea Housing Bank (6 titles each)

The President's Cup National Football Tournament is a football competition, held by Korea Football Association, for South Korean semi-professional and amateur football clubs. This competition was originally one of major club competitions of South Korean football with Korean National Football Championship, but its status was undermined after the professional clubs appeared in South Korea according to the foundation of K League, the South Korean professional league. The tournament is usually held during the early months of the year, typically ending in March.

== Results ==
=== Finals ===
Season	Champions	Score	Runners-up	Ref.
1952	ROK Army CIC	Unknown	Joseon Textile	
1953	ROK Army CIC	Unknown	Joseon Textile	
1954	ROK Army HID	4–1	Joseon Textile	
1955	ROK Marine Corps	2–1	ROK Army Quartermaster Corps	
1956	ROK Army CIC	Unknown	ROK Army Quartermaster Corps	
1957	ROK Army CIC	2–0	ROK Army OPMG	
1958	Unknown	Unknown	Unknown	
1959	ROK Army CIC	Unknown	ROK Marine Corps	
1960	Not held			
1961	ROK Army CIC	Awarded (Note: Yonsei University abandoned the final.)	Yonsei University	
1962 (Note: Held in combination with Korean National Football Championship.)	Korea Electric Power	1–0 (a.e.t.)	Korea Tungsten	
1963	Cheil Industries	2–0 (a.e.t.)	Seoul Police Department	
1964	Korea Coal Corporation	3–2	Korea Electric Power	
1965	Korea Tungsten	Round-robin	ROK Army Quartermaster Corps	
1966	Korea Tungsten	4–0	Seoul Police Department	
1967	Cheil Industries	2–1 (a.e.t.)	Korea Electric Power	
1968	Yangzee	2–2 (a.e.t.)	Cheil Industries	
1968	Yangzee	0–0 (a.e.t.)	Cheil Industries	
1968	Yangzee	1–0	Cheil Industries	
1969	ROK Marine Corps	2–0	Yonsei University	
1970	Commercial Bank of Korea	1–0	ROK Marine Corps	
1971	ROK Army	2–0 (a.e.t.)	ROK Marine Corps	
1972	Korea Housing Bank	1–0	Korea Development Bank	
1973	Kookmin Bank	2–0	Commercial Bank of Korea	
1974	POSCO FC	2–1	Sungkyunkwan University	
1975	ROK Army	1–0	Hanyang University	
1976	Korea Automobile Insurance	1–0	Korea University	
1977	Hanyang University	2–1	Industrial Bank of Korea	
1978	Kyung Hee University	1–0	ROK Navy	
1979	ROK Navy	2–1	Korea University	
1980	Yonsei University	2–0	ROK Army	
1981	Industrial Bank of Korea	2–0	Daewoo FC	
1982	Korea University	3–1	Kookmin Bank	
1983	Kookmin Bank	2–1 (a.e.t.)	Myongji University	
1984	Myongji University	3–2	Sangmu FC	
1985	Seoul Trust Bank	1–0	Sungkyunkwan University	
1986	Kookmin Bank	1–1 (a.e.t.) (4–1 p)	Commercial Bank of Korea	
1987	Myongji University	2–1 (a.e.t.)	Kookmin Bank	
1988	Hallelujah FC	0–0 (a.e.t.) (6–5 p)	Kookmin Bank	
1989	Yonsei University	4–1	POSCO Atoms B	
1990	Kookmin Bank	1–0 (a.e.t.)	Hyundai Horang-i B	
1991	Yeungnam University	3–2	Kookmin Bank	
1992	Korea Housing Bank	1–0 (a.e.t.)	Hanil Bank	
1993	Korea Housing Bank	2–1	Korea Electric Power	
1994	E-Land Puma	1–1 (a.e.t.) (4–2 p)	Hallelujah FC	
1995	Kookmin Bank	1–1 (a.e.t.) (4–2 p)	Korea Housing Bank	
1996	Korea Housing Bank	2–0	Yeungnam University	
1997	Korea Housing Bank	2–1	Yonsei University	
1998	Korea Housing Bank	1–1 (a.e.t.) (8–7 p)	Hanil Life Insurance	
1999	Cheonan Ilhwa Chunma B	4–0	Jeonbuk Hyundai Dinos B	
2000	Korea University	1–0	Kyung Hee University	
2001	Kyung Hee University	2–0	University of Ulsan	
2002	Hongik University	1–0	Hallelujah FC (1999)	
2003	Gimpo Kookmin Bank	4–2	Korean Police	
2004	Suwon City	1–0	Incheon Korea Railroad	
2005	Hyundai Mipo Dockyard	2–1 (a.e.t.)	Goyang Kookmin Bank	
2006	Gimpo Hallelujah	2–1 (a.e.t.)	Busan Transportation Corporation	
2007	Suwon City	0–0 (a.e.t.) (6–5 p)	Konkuk University	
2008	Hyundai Mipo Dockyard	1–0	Goyang KB Kookmin Bank	
2009	Gangneung City	1–0 (a.e.t.)	Cheonan City	

=== Titles by club ===
Club	Champions	Runners-up	Seasons won
Goyang KB Kookmin Bank	6	6	1973, 1983, 1986, 1990, 1995, 2003
Korea Housing Bank	6	1	1972, 1992, 1993, 1996, 1997, 1998
ROK Army CIC	6	0	1952, 1953, 1956, 1957, 1959, 1961
ROK Navy	3	4	1955, 1969, 1979
Yonsei University	2	3	1980, 1989
Korea University	2	2	1982, 2000
Korea Tungsten	2	1	1965, 1966
Cheil Industries	2	1	1963, 1967
ROK Army	2	1	1971, 1975
Myongji University	2	1	1984, 1987
Kyung Hee University	2	1	1978, 2001
Suwon City	2	0	2004, 2007
Hyundai Mipo Dockyard	2	0	2005, 2008
Korea Electric Power	1	3	1962
Commercial Bank of Korea	1	2	1970
POSCO Atoms	1	1	1974
Hanyang University	1	1	1977
Industrial Bank of Korea	1	1	1981
Hallelujah FC	1	1	1988
Yeungnam University	1	1	1991
Gimpo Hallelujah	1	1	2006
ROK Army HID	1	0	1954
Korea Coal Corporation	1	0	1964
Yangzee	1	0	1968
Korea Automobile Insurance	1	0	1976
Seoul Trust Bank	1	0	1985
E-Land Puma	1	0	1994
Cheonan Ilhwa Chunma B	1	0	1999
Hongik University	1	0	2002
Gangneung City	1	0	2009

== Awards ==
Season	Best Player	Top goalscorer	Best Manager	Ref.
1965	Kim Jung-suk (Korea Tungsten)	Unknown	Han Hong-ki (Korea Tungsten)	
Unknown from 1966 to 1971
1972	Kim Joon-gi (Korea Housing Bank)	Kim Gyu-dae (Korea Automobile Insurance, 4 goals)	Min Byung-dae (Korea Housing Bank)	
1973	Jeong Gyu-poong (Kookmin Bank)	Jeong Gyu-poong (Kookmin Bank, 6 goals)	Jeong Hyung-sik (Kookmin Bank)	
1974	Lee Hoe-taik (POSCO FC)	Kim Chang-il (POSCO FC, 3 goals)	Han Hong-ki (POSCO FC)	
1975	Kim Jin-kook (ROK Army)	Jo Won-gyu (Korea University, 5 goals)	Sung Nak-woon (ROK Army)	
1976	Ha Tae-bong (Korea Automobile Insurance)	Lee Young-hang (Seoul Bank, 4 goals)	Moon Jung-sik (Korea Automobile Insurance)	
1977	Kim Jeong-hoon (Hanyang University)	Park Sung-hwa (Korea University, 5 goals)	Choi Eun-taek (Hanyang University)	
1978	Song Joon-bok (Kyung Hee University)	Unknown	Choi Yung-keun (Kyung Hee University)	
1979	Huh Jung-moo (ROK Navy)	Jeong Hyeon-bok (ROK Navy, 5 goals)	Park Se-hak (ROK Navy)	
1980	Chung Hae-won (Yonsei University)	Chung Hae-won (Yonsei University, 5 goals)	Chang Woon-soo (Yonsei University)	
1981	Shin Wu-seong (Industrial Bank of Korea)	Unknown	Choi Gil-soo (Industrial Bank of Korea)	
1982	Lee Kang-jo (Korea University)	Bae Jong-woo (Korea Electric Power, 5 goals)	Lee Cha-man (Korea University)	
1983	Noh In-ho (Myongji University)	Lee Tae-hee (Kookmin Bank, 7 goals) (Note: Hanil Bank player Lee Sang-yong scored one more goal than Lee Tae-hee, but was excluded due to his ill-advised foul in the 2–1 semi-final defeat to Kookmin Bank.)	Noh Heung-seop (Kookmin Bank)	
1984	Shin Dong-chul (Myongji University)	Choi Jin-han (Myongji University, 7 goals)	Yoo Pan-soon (Myongji University)	
1985	Han Ho-joon (Seoul Trust Bank)	Kim Young-cheol (Kookmin Bank, 5 goals)	Lee Se-yeon (Seoul Trust Bank)	
1986	An Seong-ryeol (Kookmin Bank)	Kim Moon-gyu (Commercial Bank of Korea, 4 goals); Kim Seong-nam (Industrial Bank of Korea, 4 goals)	Gil Gi-cheol (Kookmin Bank)	
1987	Kim Kyung-rae (Myongji University)	Yoo Seung-gwan (Konkuk University, 5 goals)	Yoo Pan-soon (Myongji University)	
1988	Oh Seok-jae (Hallelujah FC)	Oh Seok-jae (Hallelujah FC, 6 goals)	Hwang Jae-man (Hallelujah FC)	
1989	Yoo Soo-sang (Yonsei University)	Not awarded (Note: The KFA decided not to give awards to five joint-top goalscorers.)	Jung Byung-tak (Yonsei University)	
1990	Hwang Gwang-soon (Kookmin Bank)	Shin Ho-cheol (Samick FC, 5 goals)	Kim Jin-kook (Kookmin Bank)	
1991	Kim Dong-sik (Yeungnam University)	Cha Sang-hoon (Yeungnam University, 6 goals); Lee Tae-hong (Daegu University, 6 goals)	Park Su-deok (Yeungnam University)	
1992	Um Seong-yong (Korea Housing Bank)	Kim Gook-hwan (Cheongju University, 5 goals); Kim Hyeon-cheol (Kookmin Bank, 5 goals)	Chae Hee-young (Korea Housing Bank)	
1993	Kim Yong-gook (Korea Housing Bank)	Park Du-jeong (Sangmu FC, 6 goals)	Chae Hee-young (Korea Housing Bank)	
1994	Kim Du-ham (E-Land Puma)	Unknown	Unknown	
1995	Han Sang-man (Kookmin Bank)	Baek Soon-gi (Korea Housing Bank, 5 goals)	Unknown	
1996	Lee Su-jae (Korea Housing Bank)	Choi Moon-sik (Sangmu FC, 6 goals)	Unknown	
1997	Son Gi-young (Korea Housing Bank)	Unknown	Unknown	
1998	Choi Tae-ho (Korea Housing Bank)	Unknown	Unknown	
1999	Hwang Yeon-seok (Cheonan Ilhwa Chunma B)	Hwang Yeon-seok (Cheonan Ilhwa Chunma B, 11 goals)	Unknown	
2000	Kim Sang-rok (Korea University)	Lee Gwang-jae (Daegu University, 6 goals)	Unknown	
2001	Jeong Shung-hoon (Kyung Hee University)	Unknown	Unknown	
2002	Kim Jong-hoon (Hongik University)	Lee Jin-seok (Hongik University, 7 goals)	Unknown	
2003	Lee Young-min (Gimpo Kookmin Bank)	Kim Seung-ho (Seoul City, 10 goals)	Kim Hyung-yeol (Gimpo Kookmin Bank)	
2004	Yang Jong-hoo (Suwon City)	Han Dong-won (FC Seoul B, 8 goals)	Kim Chang-gyeom (Suwon City)	
2005	Jeon Sang-dae (Hyundai Mipo Dockyard)	Kim Young-sin (Yonsei University, 5 goals)	Cho Dong-hyun (Hyundai Mipo Dockyard)	
2006	Seong Ho-sang (Gimpo Hallelujah)	Unknown	Na Byung-soo (Gimpo Hallelujah)	
2007	Kim Dong-jin (Suwon City)	Kim Won-min (Konkuk University, unknown)	Kim Chang-gyeom (Suwon City)	
2008	Ahn Sung-nam (Hyundai Mipo Dockyard)	Unknown	Choi Soon-ho (Hyundai Mipo Dockyard)	
2009	Kim Jang-hyeon (Gangneung City)	Lee Yong-seung (Busan Transportation Corporation, 5 goals)	Park Moon-young (Gangneung City)	

== See also ==
- List of Korea Cup winners
- Korea Cup (domestic)
- All Joseon Football Championship
- Korean National Football Championship
- National Semi-professional Football League (South Korea)
