= Huh Jung-moo =

South Korean footballer

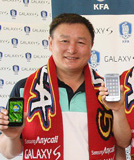
- Huh in 2010

Personal information
- Full name: Huh Jung-moo
- Date of birth: 13 January 1955 (age 71)
- Place of birth: Jindo, South Korea
- Height: 1.76 m (5 ft 9 in)
- Position: Midfielder

Youth career
- 1968–?: Mokpo Chungho Middle School
- ?–1971: Joongdong Middle School
- 1971–1974: Yongdungpo Technical High School

College career
Years	Team	Apps	(Gls)
1974–1977	Yonsei University		

Senior career*
Years	Team	Apps	(Gls)
1978–1980	Korea Electric Power		
1978–1980	→ ROK Navy (draft)		
1980–1983	PSV Eindhoven	77	(11)
1984–1986	Hyundai Horang-i	36	(4)
Total		113	(15)

International career
1973–1974	South Korea U20		
1974–1986	South Korea	104	(30)

Managerial career
- 1991–1992: POSCO Atoms (assistant)
- 1993–1995: Pohang Atoms
- 1993–1994: South Korea (assistant)
- 1995: South Korea (caretaker)
- 1996–1998: Jeonnam Dragons
- 1998–2000: South Korea
- 2004: South Korea (assistant)
- 2005–2007: Jeonnam Dragons
- 2008–2010: South Korea
- 2010–2012: Incheon United
Medal record
Men's football
Representing South Korea (as player)
Asian Games
Gold medal – first place	1978 Bangkok
Gold medal – first place	1986 Seoul
AFC Youth Championship
Bronze medal – third place	1973 Iran
Bronze medal – third place	1974 Thailand
Representing South Korea (as manager)
AFC Asian Cup
Bronze medal – third place	2000 Lebanon
EAFF Championship
Winner	2008 China
Runner-up	2010 Japan
- * Club domestic league appearances and goals

- Huh Jung-moo
- Hangul: 허정무
- Hanja: 許丁茂
- RR: Heo Jeongmu
- MR: Hŏ Chŏngmu

Huh Jung-moo (Korean: 허정무; Hanja: 許丁茂; born 13 January 1955) is a former South Korean football player and manager.

== Club career ==
Huh was one of the best South Korean college footballers before starting his semi-professional career. He was often compared with Korea University's Cha Bum-kun while playing for Yonsei University. After his graduation, he joined Korea Electric Power FC, and simultaneously enlisted in Marine Corps and Navy FC to do mandatory military service.

When Huh was discharged from the military service, European clubs were interested in Asian players thanks to Cha's performances at the Bundesliga. Motivated by Cha, Huh also wanted to leave for Europe, joining Eredivisie side PSV Eindhoven in August 1980. For three years at PSV, he mainly played as a defensive midfielder, making opposing teams' key players tired. After suffering from Huh's persistent defense, Johan Cruyff intentionally broke Huh's nose with his arm, and Willem van Hanegem made a "slant-eye" gesture to Huh. Huh decided to return to South Korea at the end of the 1982–83 season. His wife felt homesick at the time, and he also did not feel the need to live abroad after hearing the news that a professional league would be founded in his country. Huh joined newly-formed Hyundai Horang-i in 1984, playing for them for three years.

== International career ==
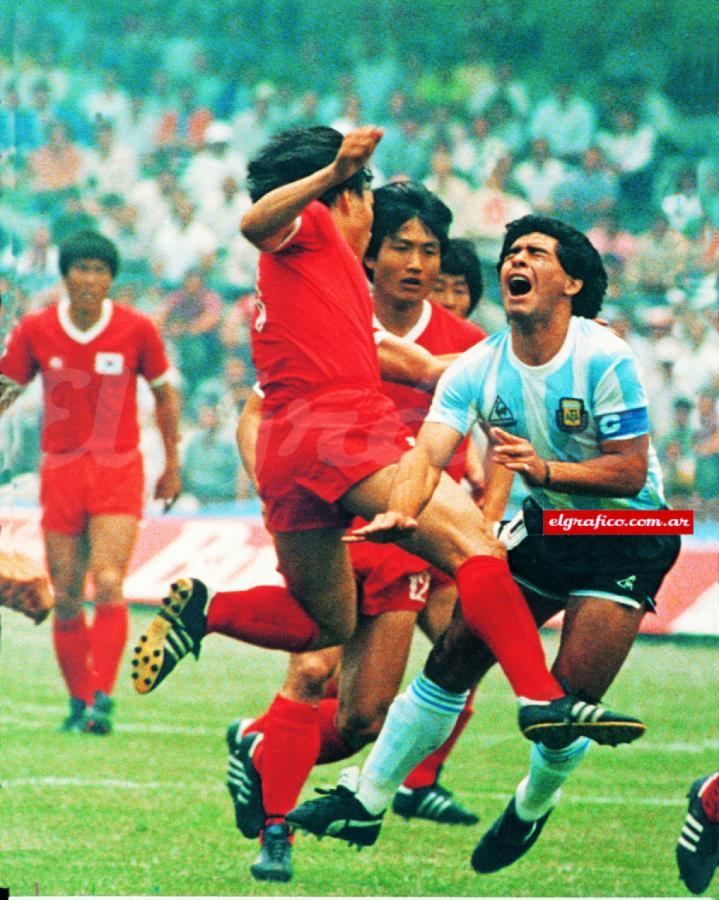
Huh marking Diego Maradona at the 1986 FIFA World Cup

Huh played for the South Korea national team between 1974 and 1986. He helped the team win two Asian Games titles and qualify for the 1986 FIFA World Cup.

Huh was famous for a scene of him making Diego Maradona grimace during the 1986 World Cup. His kick hit Maradona's leg instead of the ball when he attempted a clearance in the middle of South Korea's opener against Argentina. He then scored a goal against Italy.

== Style of play ==
Huh was nicknamed the "Jindo dog". He exhaustively performed his managers' orders, reminding others of the indigenous dog of his hometown Jindo County. Early in his career, Huh played as a striker, winger or attacking midfielder for South Korea, being in charge of offensive roles. He started to play as a defensive midfielder after joining PSV, and even played as a left-back at the World Cup. He did not have rapid pace, but showed great stamina and intelligent movements.

== Managerial career ==
=== Pohang Atoms ===
In April 1989, Huh was appointed a coach of the South Korea national team, beginning his coaching career. He was promoted to the assistant coach when manager Lee Hoe-taik left for K League club POSCO Atoms after the 1990 FIFA World Cup, but he decided to follow Lee the next month.

After working as assistant coach to Lee for about two years at POSCO Atoms (renamed Pohang Atoms in 1995), Huh was promoted to manager prior to the 1993 season. He led the team to win the Korean League Cup title in his first season as a manager. In 1995, his team advanced to the league's final by winning the second stage of the regular season, but conceded the golden goal in the rematch after drawing the two-legged final with Ilhwa Chunma. He left the club that year, although they suggested a contract extension.

=== Jeonnam Dragons ===
In May 1996, Huh started to manage Jeonnam Dragons at the same league. In 1997, Jeonnam finished runners-up at both the league and the Korean League Cup despite their 21-match unbeaten run under him. But his efforts bore fruit at the end of the season, with his team winning the Korean FA Cup.

=== South Korea ===
While managing POSCO Atoms, he simultaneously worked as the assistant coach of the South Korea national team between December 1993 and June 1994, and temporarily managed them in a 1–0 friendly defeat to Brazil on 12 August 1995. In August 1998, he was appointed South Korea's permanent manager, leaving Jeonnam Dragons.

During his first managerial career at the national team, Huh was criticised for his coercive acts and one-way communication towards players. His team was eliminated in the quarter-finals and the semi-finals at the 1998 Asian Games and the 2000 AFC Asian Cup respectively before he was replaced by Guus Hiddink in 2001. Despite these results, he was re-evaluated after a considerable number of young players discovered by him led the team to the semi-finals at the 2002 FIFA World Cup.

=== Return to Jeonnam ===
In June 2001, Huh became the director of the Yongin Football Center, newly formed to nurture young talents. He took charge of the center even after he was reappointed manager of Jeonnam Dragons in December 2004, but he then attempted to transfer the center's player Lee Seung-yeoul to Jeonnam through his acquaintance instead of an official agent before leaving there in November 2005.

During his second spell at Jeonnam, Huh won two Korean FA Cup titles, but K League fans made an imaginary standings, which awarded three points for a draw, one additional point for a goalless draw and no points for a win or a loss, with the name of "Huh Jung-moo Cup" to criticise his poor results at the league, which contained numerous draws.

=== Return to South Korea ===
After Hiddink's success at the 2002 World Cup, South Korea continuously employed foreign managers until 2007. When Pim Verbeek left the team after the 2007 AFC Asian Cup, they were interested in Mick McCarthy and Gérard Houllier, but their offers were refused. South Korea then chose Huh in December, recruiting a native manager for the first time in seven years. South Korea lost 1–0 to Chile in Huh's first match on 30 January 2008 before going on a 27-match unbeaten run until a 0–0 draw with Denmark on 14 November 2009. His team earned seven wins and seven draws without defeat in the 2010 FIFA World Cup qualifiers, qualifying for the tournament as group winners. He was named the AFC Coach of the Year thanks to these results, whereas the processes of the results caused controversy among South Korean fans, who nicknamed his style "Huhmoo (the Korean word for hollow) football".

Huh became the first-ever South Korean manager to win a FIFA World Cup match when South Korea defeated Greece 2–0 in their 2010 tournament opener. Afterwards, his team finished runners-up in the Group B by losing 4–1 to Argentina and drawing 2–2 with Nigeria. He led his country to advance to the World Cup knockout stage for the first time on foreign soil. They went out of the competition in the round of 16, where they lost 2–1 to Uruguay.

=== Incheon United ===
Between August 2010 and April 2012, Huh managed another K League club Incheon United. In the 2011 season, his team drew 14 out of 30 league matches, reminding fans of the "Huh Jung-moo Cup". Prior to the 2012 season, Incheon changed most of the players in their squad, and he promised fans a top-eight finish. However, he brought only one win in seven matches before resigning from the club early in the season.

== Administrative career ==
In March 2013, Huh was appointed a vice-president of the Korea Football Association (KFA) by president Chung Mong-gyu. In July 2014, he resigned from the association along with national team manager Hong Myung-bo for the team's poor performance at the 2014 FIFA World Cup.

Since 2015, Huh worked at the K League Federation as the vice-president before being selected as the director of K League 2 club Daejeon Hana Citizen in 2020.

After leaving Daejeon Hana Citizen in June 2023, Huh ran for KFA president in November 2024. He was one of three candidates along with existing president Chung Mong-gyu and another challenger Shin Moon-sun. In February 2025, he lost to Chung in the election.

== Career statistics ==
=== Club ===
Appearances and goals by club, season and competition
Club	Season	League			National cup		League cup		Continental		Total	
Club	Season	Division	Apps	Goals	Apps	Goals	Apps	Goals	Apps	Goals	Apps	Goals
Korea Electric Power	1978	National Semipro League	?	?	—		—		—		?	?
ROK Navy (draft)	1978	National Semipro League	?	?	? (Note: Appearance(s) in Korean National Championship, Korean President's Cup)	?	—		—		?	?
ROK Navy (draft)	1979	National Semipro League	?	?	?	?	—		—		?	?
ROK Navy (draft)	1980	National Semipro League	?	?	?	?	—		—		?	?
ROK Navy (draft)	Total		?	?	?	?	—		—		?	?
PSV Eindhoven	1980–81	Eredivisie	28	6	? (Note: Appearance(s) in KNVB Cup)	?	—		4	0	32	6
PSV Eindhoven	1981–82	Eredivisie	30	4	?	?	—		2	1	32	5
PSV Eindhoven	1982–83	Eredivisie	19	1	?	?	—		1	0	20	1
PSV Eindhoven	Total		77	11	?	?	—		7	1	84	12
Hyundai Horang-i	1984	K League	23	3	—		—		—		23	3
Hyundai Horang-i	1985	K League	5	1	—		—		—		5	1
Hyundai Horang-i	1986	K League	8	0	—		3	1	—		11	1
Hyundai Horang-i	Total		36	4	—		3	1	—		39	5
Career total			113	15	?	?	3	1	7	1	123	17

=== International ===
Appearances and goals by national team and year
National team	Year	Apps	Goals
South Korea	1974	5	1
South Korea	1975	8	1
South Korea	1976	9	1
South Korea	1977	24	11
South Korea	1978	19	4
South Korea	1979	6	5
South Korea	1980	8	2
South Korea	1984	9	0
South Korea	1985	7	4
South Korea	1986	9	1
Career total		104	30

Appearances and goals by competition
Competition	Apps	Goals
Friendlies	11	5
Minor competitions	33	14
Asian Games	12	1
AFC Asian Cup qualification	10	2
AFC Asian Cup	4	0
Summer Olympics qualification	12	2
FIFA World Cup qualification	19	5
FIFA World Cup	3	1
Total	104	30

Results list South Korea's goal tally first.

List of international goals scored by Huh Jung-moo
No.	Date	Venue	Cap	Opponent	Score	Result	Competition
1	20 December 1974	Bangkok, Thailand	4	Thailand	3–1	3–1 (a.e.t.)	1974 King's Cup
2	22 May 1975	Seoul, South Korea	10	Burma	1–0	1–0	1975 Korea Cup
3	4 November 1976	Tokyo, Japan	20	Japan	1–1	2–1	Japan–South Korea regular match
4	14 February 1977	Singapore	23	Singapore	3–0	4–0	Friendly
5	18 February 1977	Manama, Bahrain	24	Bahrain	1–0	4–1	Friendly
6	18 February 1977	Manama, Bahrain	24	Bahrain	4–1	4–1	Friendly
7	20 February 1977	Manama, Bahrain	25	Bahrain	1–0	1–1	Friendly
8	17 July 1977	Kuala Lumpur, Malaysia	33	Libya	1–0	4–0	1977 Pestabola Merdeka
9	17 July 1977	Kuala Lumpur, Malaysia	33	Libya	3–0	4–0	1977 Pestabola Merdeka
10	17 July 1977	Kuala Lumpur, Malaysia	33	Libya	4–0	4–0	1977 Pestabola Merdeka
11	26 July 1977	Kuala Lumpur, Malaysia	36	Malaysia	1–0	1–1	1977 Pestabola Merdeka
12	3 September 1977	Seoul, South Korea	40	Thailand	4–0	5–1	1977 Korea Cup
13	3 September 1977	Seoul, South Korea	40	Thailand	5–0	5–1	1977 Korea Cup
14	4 December 1977	Busan, South Korea	46	Hong Kong	2–0	5–2	1978 FIFA World Cup qualification
15	13 September 1978	Daegu, South Korea	55	Bahrain	1–1	3–1	1978 Korea Cup
16	12 December 1978	Bangkok, Thailand	57	Kuwait	2–0	2–0	1978 Asian Games
17	25 December 1978	Manila, Philippines	63	Macau	1–0	4–1	1980 AFC Asian Cup qualification
18	29 December 1978	Manila, Philippines	65	China	1–0	1–0	1980 AFC Asian Cup qualification
19	8 September 1979	Seoul, South Korea	68	Sudan	4–0	8–0	1979 Korea Cup
20	12 September 1979	Daegu, South Korea	69	Sri Lanka	1–0	6–0	1979 Korea Cup
21	16 September 1979	Incheon, South Korea	71	Bangladesh	1–0	9–0	1979 Korea Cup
22	16 September 1979	Incheon, South Korea	71	Bangladesh	5–0	9–0	1979 Korea Cup
23	16 September 1979	Incheon, South Korea	71	Bangladesh	7–0	9–0	1979 Korea Cup
24	22 March 1980	Kuala Lumpur, Malaysia	74	Japan	1–0	3–1	1980 Summer Olympics qualification
25	27 March 1980	Kuala Lumpur, Malaysia	76	Philippines	8–0	8–0	1980 Summer Olympics qualification
26	6 April 1985	Seoul, South Korea	91	Nepal	1–0	4–0	1986 FIFA World Cup qualification
27	6 April 1985	Seoul, South Korea	91	Nepal	4–0	4–0	1986 FIFA World Cup qualification
28	30 July 1985	Jakarta, Indonesia	94	Indonesia	3–0	4–1	1986 FIFA World Cup qualification
29	3 November 1985	Seoul, South Korea	95	Japan	1–0	1–0	1986 FIFA World Cup qualification
30	10 June 1986	Puebla, Mexico	99	Italy	2–3	2–3	1986 FIFA World Cup

== Honours ==
=== Player ===
Yonsei University

- Korean National Championship runner-up: 1974

ROK Navy

- Korean President's Cup: 1979

Hyundai Horang-i

- Korean League Cup: 1986

South Korea U20

- AFC Youth Championship third place: 1973, 1974

South Korea

- Asian Games: 1978, 1986

Individual

- Korean National Championship top goalscorer: 1974
- Korean FA Best XI: 1974, 1977, 1978, 1979, 1984, 1985, 1986
- Korean President's Cup Best Player: 1979
- Korean FA Most Valuable Player: 1984
- K League 1 Best XI: 1984
- K League '80s All-Star Team: 2003

=== Manager ===
POSCO Atoms

- Korean League Cup: 1993

Jeonnam Dragons

- Korean FA Cup: 1997, 2006, 2007
- Korean League Cup runner-up: 1997

South Korea

- AFC Asian Cup third place: 2000
- EAFF Championship: 2008

Individual

- K League All-Star: 1995, 2005, 2006
- AFC Coach of the Month: May 1999, October 1999
- Korean FA Cup Best Manager: 2006, 2007
- AFC Coach of the Year: 2009
