= Han Hong-ki =

South Korean football manager (1925–1996)

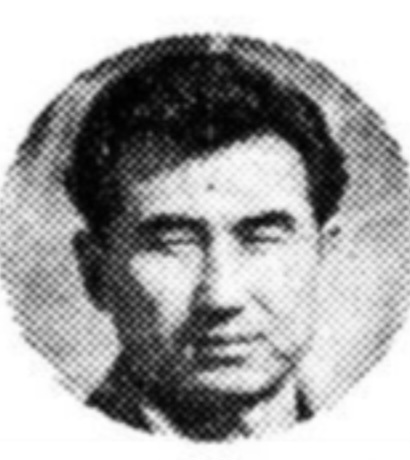
- Han in 1971

Personal information
- Date of birth: 9 June 1925
- Place of birth: Taedong, Korea, Empire of Japan
- Date of death: 7 July 1996 (aged 71)
- Place of death: Seongnam, South Korea

Senior career*
| Years | Team | Apps | (Gls) |
- Sangho Bank
- ROK Army HID
- Korea Tungsten

Managerial career
- 1962–1971: Korea Tungsten
- 1970–1971: South Korea
- 1973–1975: POSCO FC
- 1983–1984: POSCO Dolphins
Medal record
Men's football
Representing South Korea (as manager)
Asian Games
| Gold medal – first place | 1970 Bangkok |
- * Club domestic league appearances and goals

- Han Hong-ki
- Hangul: 한홍기
- RR: Han Honggi
- MR: Han Honggi

Han Hong-ki (Korean: 한홍기; 9 June 1925 – 7 July 1996) was a South Korean football player and manager. He won three Asian titles, namely Asian Games, Merdeka Tournament and King's Cup, while managing South Korea national team in 1970. He is the first professional manager of K League club Pohang Steelers (POSCO Dolphins at the time).

== Honours ==
=== Manager ===
Korea Tungsten

- Korean National Semipro League (Spring): 1965, 1968
- Korean National Semipro League (Autumn): 1965, 1966
- Korean President's Cup: 1965, 1966
- Korean National Championship runner-up: 1962, 1968

South Korea

- Asian Games: 1970

POSCO FC

- Korean National Semipro League (Spring): 1975
- Korean President's Cup: 1974

Individual

- Korean President's Cup Best Manager: 1965, 1974
- Korean National Semipro League (Spring) Best Manager: 1975
