= Ha Seok-ju =

South Korean footballer and manager

Personal information
- Full name: Ha Seok-ju
- Date of birth: 20 February 1968 (age 58)
- Place of birth: Hamyang, Gyeongnam, South Korea
- Height: 1.74 m (5 ft 8 1/2 in)
- Positions: Winger; left-back

Team information
- Current team: Ajou University (manager)

Youth career
- 1980–1982: Kyungshin Middle School
- 1983–1985: Kwangwoon Electronics; Technical High School

College career
Years	Team	Apps	(Gls)
1986–1989	Ajou University		

Senior career*
Years	Team	Apps	(Gls)
1990–1997	Daewoo Royals	158	(34)
1998	Cerezo Osaka	17	(2)
1998–2000	Vissel Kobe	65	(11)
2001–2003	Pohang Steelers	57	(3)
Total		297	(50)

International career
1996	South Korea U23	5 (Note: Appearances as an overage player (three appearances in Summer Olympics, two appearances and one goal in friendlies))	(1)
1991–2001	South Korea	94	(23)

Managerial career
- 2011–2012: Ajou University
- 2012–2014: Jeonnam Dragons
- 2015–: Ajou University
Medal record
Representing South Korea
Men's football
AFC Asian Cup
Bronze medal – third place	2000 Lebanon	Team
- * Club domestic league appearances and goals

- Ha Seok-ju
- Hangul: 하석주
- Hanja: 河錫舟
- RR: Ha Seokju
- MR: Ha Sŏkchu

Ha Seok-ju (Korean: 하석주; born 20 February 1968) is a South Korean football manager and former player.

== International career ==
He played for the South Korea national football team, and was a participant in 1994 and 1998 FIFA World Cup. In the 1998 World Cup, he played the first game against Mexico, scoring the opener with a free kick. However, he was sent off for an ill-advised tackle three minutes after his goal. South Korea conceded three goals after his exit. He also could not play the game against the Netherlands due to the punishment for his red card, and South Korea lost 5–0 during his absence. He came back for the last game against Belgium, assisting Yoo Sang-chul's equaliser with a free kick again. He contributed to all of South Korea's two goals in the 1998 World Cup, but due to the red card was hated among fans. He was also feeling guilty towards the manager Cha Bum-kun, who was sacked from the national team in the middle of the tournament, and so he avoided Cha for 20 years.

== Career statistics ==
=== Club ===
Appearances and goals by club, season and competition
Club	Season	League			National cup		League cup		Total	
Club	Season	Division	Apps	Goals	Apps	Goals	Apps	Goals	Apps	Goals
Daewoo Royals	1990	K League	24	4	? (Note: Appearances as a reserve player in Korean National Championship)	(5)	—		24	4
Daewoo Royals	1991	K League	34	7	—		—		34	7
Daewoo Royals	1992	K League	22	5	—		7	0	29	5
Daewoo Royals	1993	K League	9	0	—		2	0	11	0
Daewoo Royals	1994	K League	16	4	—		0	0	16	4
Daewoo Royals	1995	K League	27	3	—		7	4	34	7
Daewoo Royals	1996	K League	22	11	? (Note: Appearance(s) in Korean FA Cup)	?	4	0	26	11
Daewoo Royals	1997	K League	4	0	?	?	9	4	13	4
Daewoo Royals	Total		158	34	?	?	29	8	187	42
Cerezo Osaka	1998	J1 League	17	2	0	0	0	0	17	2
Vissel Kobe	1998	J1 League	9	2	2	1	0	0	11	3
Vissel Kobe	1999	J1 League	28	7	0	0	1	0	29	7
Vissel Kobe	2000	J1 League	28	2	4	0	1	0	33	2
Vissel Kobe	Total		65	11	6	1	2	0	73	12
Pohang Steelers	2001	K League	25	3	?	?	6	0	31	3
Pohang Steelers	2002	K League	26	0	?	?	8	0	34	0
Pohang Steelers	2003	K League	6	0	0	0	—		6	0
Pohang Steelers	Total		57	3	?	?	14	0	71	3
Career total			297	50	6	1	45	8	348	59

=== International ===
Appearances and goals by national team and year
National team	Year	Apps	Goals
South Korea	1991	5	5
South Korea	1992	4	0
South Korea	1993	17	9
South Korea	1994	18	2
South Korea	1995	2	0
South Korea	1996	12	1
South Korea	1997	19	3
South Korea	1998	6	1
South Korea	1999	2	0
South Korea	2000	5	1
South Korea	2001	4	1
Career total		94	23

Results list South Korea's goal tally first.

List of international goals scored by Ha Seok-ju
No.	Date	Venue	Cap	Opponent	Score	Result	Competition
1	9 June 1991	Seoul, South Korea	1	Indonesia	3–0	3–0	1991 Korea Cup
2	11 June 1991	Seoul, South Korea	2	Malta	1–0	1–1	1991 Korea Cup
3	16 June 1991	Seoul, South Korea	4	Egypt	1–0	2–0	1991 Korea Cup
4	16 June 1991	Seoul, South Korea	4	Egypt	2–0	2–0	1991 Korea Cup
5	27 July 1991	Nagasaki, Japan	5	Japan	1–0	1–0	Friendly
6	28 April 1993	Ulsan, South Korea	11	Iraq	1–0	2–2	Friendly
7	11 May 1993	Beirut, Lebanon	13	Lebanon	1–0	1–0	1994 FIFA World Cup qualification
8	13 May 1993	Beirut, Lebanon	14	India	3–0	3–0	1994 FIFA World Cup qualification
9	15 May 1993	Beirut, Lebanon	15	Hong Kong	1–0	3–0	1994 FIFA World Cup qualification
10	5 June 1993	Seoul, South Korea	16	Hong Kong	3–1	4–1	1994 FIFA World Cup qualification
11	7 June 1993	Seoul, South Korea	17	Lebanon	1–0	2–0	1994 FIFA World Cup qualification
12	9 June 1993	Seoul, South Korea	18	India	6–0	7–0	1994 FIFA World Cup qualification
13	16 October 1993	Doha, Qatar	22	Iran	2–0	3–0	1994 FIFA World Cup qualification
14	28 October 1993	Doha, Qatar	26	North Korea	3–0	3–0	1994 FIFA World Cup qualification
15	1 October 1994	Hiroshima, Japan	40	Nepal	1–0	11–0	1994 Asian Games
16	1 October 1994	Hiroshima, Japan	40	Nepal	8–0	11–0	1994 Asian Games
17	25 September 1996	Seoul, South Korea	52	China	3–1	3–1	Friendly
18	22 January 1997	Brisbane, Australia	60	Australia	1–2	1–2	1997 Opus Tournament
19	2 March 1997	Bangkok, Thailand	62	Thailand	2–1	3–1	1998 FIFA World Cup qualification
20	4 October 1997	Seoul, South Korea	73	United Arab Emirates	1–0	3–0	1998 FIFA World Cup qualification
21	13 June 1998	Lyon, France	82	Mexico	1–0	1–3	1998 FIFA World Cup
22	26 April 2000	Seoul, South Korea	86	Japan	1–0	1–0	Friendly
23	26 April 2001	Cairo, Egypt	92	Egypt	1–0	2–1	2001 LG Cup

== Honours ==
=== Player ===
Ajou University

- Korean National Championship runner-up: 1986

Daewoo Royals B

- Korean National Championship: 1990

Daewoo Royals

- K League 1: 1991, 1997
- Korean League Cup: 1997, 1997+

Pohang Steelers

- Korean FA Cup runner-up: 2001, 2002

South Korea

- AFC Asian Cup third place: 2000

Individual

- Korean National Championship Most Valuable Player: 1990
- Korean National Championship top goalscorer: 1990
- K League All-Star: 1991, 1995, 1997, 2001, 2002
- K League 1 Best XI: 1996
- FIFA World XI: 1997
- AFC Asian All-Star: 1997

=== Manager ===
Individual

- K League Manager of the Month: July 2014

=== Television personality ===
List of awards and nominations received by TV personality Ha Seok-ju
Award ceremony	Year	Category	Nominated work	Result	Ref.
SBS Entertainment Awards	2022	Leader of the Year Award (Note: Shared with Kim Byung-ji, Kim Tae-young, Choi Jin-cheul, Choi Sung-yong, Lee Eul-yong, Hyun Young-min, Lee Young-pyo, Oh Beom-seok, Cho Jae-jin and Baek Ji-hoon)	Kick a Goal	Won	
