= 2002 Korean FA Cup =

2002 Hana-Seoul Bank FA Cup

Tournament details
- Country: South Korea

Final positions
- Champions: Suwon Samsung Bluewings (1st title)
- Runners-up: Pohang Steelers

Tournament statistics
- Top goal scorer(s): Lee Dong-gook; Gong Oh-kyun; Tico Mineiro (3 goals each)

Awards
- Best player: Seo Jung-won

The 2002 Korean FA Cup, known as the 2002 Hana-Seoul Bank FA Cup, was the seventh edition of the Korean FA Cup.

== Qualifying rounds ==
=== First round ===
22 November	Daegu University	2–1	Sungkyunkwan University	Namhae Sports Park
	Ryu Jae-gwon 1'; Bae Jun-yeong 36'		Kim Gwan-ho 4'

22 November	Dong-Eui University	5–2	Gwangju Samsung Electronics	Namhae Sports Park
	Jeong Hong-yeon 13', 53'; Park Cheon-sin 16'; Kim Jun-min 47'; Kim Hyeong-min 80'		Gang Jun-hyeong 43'; Kim Jong-ok 86'

22 November	Korea University	5–1	Samik Musical Instruments	Gimcheon Stadium
	Choi Sung-kuk 4', 30'; Park Yeong-geun 26'; Ju Kwang-youn 69'; Lee Jeong-gyu 73'		Bae Jong-pil 71'

22 November	Chunnam Techno University	0–3	Hongik University	Gimcheon Stadium
			Choi Jae-yeong 45'; Kim Dong-hyun 76'; Kim Yun-sik 87'

=== Second round ===
23 November	Seoul City	3–1	Pai Chai University	Namhae Sports Park
	Kim Seung-ho 34', 90'; Gang Gyeong-hwan 54'		Lee Mu-hyeong 88'

23 November	University of Ulsan	2–1	Gwangju FC	Namhae Sports Park
	Kim Dong-hwan 10'; Chung Kyung-ho 68'		Kim Tae-hun 13'

23 November	Myongji University	7–0	Yong In University	Namhae Stadium
	Gwon Sang-tae 51', 62'; Kim Jin-du 68'; Kim Hyeong-hun 77'; Jeon Kwang-jin 86', 89'; Han Tae-you 88'

23 November	Korea Railroad	0–0 (5–4 p)	Konkuk University	Namhae Stadium

23 November	Hyundai Mipo Dockyard	3–0	Sunmoon University	Gimcheon Stadium
	Jo Yong-seok 9'; Go Bong-hyeon 14'; Kim Yeong-gi 67'

23 November	Hanyang University	2–0	Pohang City	Gimcheon Stadium
	Kim Sin-young 75', 81'

23 November	Hannam University	3–1	Korea National Open University	Gimcheon Stadium Subfield
	Park Jong-chan 13', 66'; Sin Chung-hui 63'		Kim Si-cheol 81'

23 November	Ajou University	1–1 (4–3 p)	Korean Police	Gimcheon Stadium Subfield
	Kim Jae-sung 84'		Kim Seong-gyeong 68'

24 November	LG-philips Display	1–2	Saekyung College	Namhae Sports Park
	Oh Yu-jin 56'		Sim Jae-won 18'; Park Jae-hun 55'

24 November	Sunghwa College	1–6	Daegu University	Namhae Sports Park
	Gil Su 75' (o.g.); Lim Hyeon-seung 80'		Bae Jun-yeong 15'; Kim Ji-un 40'; Kang Min-hyuk 54'; Ryu Jae-gwon 67', 79'

24 November	Kyung Hee University	0–4	Sangmu FC	Namhae Stadium
			Cho Jae-jin 21', 62'; Kim Hae-chul 39'; Oh Seung-bum 78'

24 November	Dong-Eui University	2–2 (4–3 p)	Kyungil University	Namhae Stadium
	Woo Ju-yeong 71'		Kim Jae-u 10'; Kim Gyeong-min 34' (o.g.); Kim Gyeong-do 61'

24 November	University of Incheon	4–0	Jeonbuk Gochang Dolmen	Gimcheon Stadium
	Hwang Jeong-hui 1', 38'; Gwon Deok-yong 11'; Na Gyeong-ho 67'

24 November	World Cyber College	0–8	Korea University	Gimcheon Stadium
			Lee Jin-woo 1', 68'; Jang Jae-wan 6'; Lee Kil-hoon 28'; Choi Sung-kuk 45'; Ju Kwang-youn 62'; Kim Tae-ryung 87'; Kim Young-sam 90'

24 November	Kangwon Tourism College	0–4	Gangneung City	Gimcheon Stadium Subfield
			Hwang Dong-su 13', 72'; An Hong-min 22'; Kim Hae-guk 78'

24 November	Hongik University	3–0	Jeonbuk National University	Gimcheon Stadium Subfield
	Kim Dong-hyun 37'; Lee Jin-seok 46', 79'

== Final rounds ==
=== Bracket ===
Round of 16
Daejeon Citizen	3
Korea Railroad	0
Hyundai Mipo Dockyard	2
Ulsan Hyundai Horang-i	3
Jeonbuk Hyundai Motors	2
Sangmu FC	1
Suwon Samsung Bluewings	2
Seoul City	0
Seongnam Ilhwa Chunma	3
Gangneung City	2
Busan I'Cons	5
Hannam University	1
Jeonnam Dragons	2
Bucheon SK	1
Pohang Steelers	3
Ajou University	1

Quarter-finals
Daejeon Citizen	3
Ulsan Hyundai Horang-i	1
Jeonbuk Hyundai Motors	0
Suwon Samsung Bluewings	1
Seongnam Ilhwa Chunma	3
Busan I'Cons	2
Jeonnam Dragons	1
Pohang Steelers	2

Semi-finals
Daejeon Citizen	0
Suwon Samsung Bluewings	1
Seongnam Ilhwa Chunma	1
Pohang Steelers	2

Final
Suwon Samsung Bluewings	1
Pohang Steelers	0

=== Third round ===
Six clubs won by default: Daejeon Citizen, Pohang Steelers, Seongnam Ilhwa Chunma, Suwon Samsung Bluewings, Jeonbuk Hyundai Motors and Busan I'Cons.

30 November	Korea Railroad	3–0	Saekyung College	Namhae Stadium
	Park Han-seok 49', 71'; Kim Chan-seok 60'

30 November	Anyang LG Cheetahs	0–1 (a.e.t.)	Hyundai Mipo Dockyard	Namhae Stadium
			Kim Yeong-gi 113'

30 November	Gangneung City	2–1 (a.e.t.)	University of Ulsan	Gimcheon Stadium
	Ahn Hong-min 30'; Oh Ju-po 120+'		Kim Hwi-hyeon 88'

30 November	Hannam University	0–0 (a.e.t.) (7–6 p)	Hanyang University	Gimcheon Stadium

1 December	Ulsan Hyundai Horang-i	3–2	Myongji University	Namhae Stadium
	Cleber Arildo 4'; Kim Hyun-seok 41'; Lee Chun-soo 53'		Jeon Kwang-jin 45+'; Na Kwang-hyun 68'

1 December	Sangmu FC	3–0	Korea University	Namhae Stadium
	Cho Jae-jin 34'; Kim Hae-chul 38'; Seo Ki-bok 88'

1 December	Daegu University	0–4	Jeonnam Dragons	Gimcheon Stadium
			Tico Mineiro 9'; Park Jong-woo 18'; Noh Byung-joon 76'; Kim Yo-hwan 88'

1 December	Hongik University	0–2	Bucheon SK	Gimcheon Stadium
			Park Seong-cheol 67'; Nam Ki-il 86'

2 December	Seoul City	3–1	Dong-Eui University	Namhae Stadium
	Kim Seung-ho 12', 47'; Sin Hae-myung 18'		Woo Joo-yung 90+'

2 December	University of Incheon	1–2	Ajou University	Gimcheon Stadium
	Na Gyeong-ho 83'		Jang Jong-gyung 78'; Song Jeong-woo 89'

=== Round of 16 ===
3 December	Daejeon Citizen	3–0	Korea Railroad	Namhae Sports Park
	Gong Oh-kyun 14', 19', 78'

3 December	Hyundai Mipo Dockyard	2–3	Ulsan Hyundai Horang-i	Namhae Sports Park
	Kim Jun-hyeop 70'; Ju Seung-jin 73'		Marquinhos 17', 65'; Lee Chun-soo 74'

3 December	Seongnam Ilhwa Chunma	3–2	Gangneung City	Gimcheon Stadium
	Shin Tae-yong 6'; Kim Dae-eui 39'; Alcir 51'		Kim Jang-hyeon 66'; Hwang Dong-su 81'

3 December	Hannam University	1–5	Busan I'Cons	Gimcheon Stadium
	Kim Yong-min 72'		Castillo 25', 53'; Woo Sung-yong 33', 81'; Ryu Byung-hoon 43'

4 December	Jeonbuk Hyundai Motors	2–1	Sangmu FC	Namhae Sports Park
	Kim Do-hoon 35'; Edmilson 42'		Song Hong-seop 14'

4 December	Seoul City	0–2	Suwon Samsung Bluewings	Namhae Sports Park
			Popescu 34'; Sandro Cardoso 51'

4 December	Jeonnam Dragons	2–1	Bucheon SK	Gimcheon Stadium
	Tico Mineiro 63'; Kim Do-keun 79'		Shin Hyeon-ho 75'

4 December	Ajou University	1–3	Pohang Steelers	Gimcheon Stadium
	Jang Jong-gyeong 90+'		Lee Dong-gook 42'; Yoon Bo-young 66'; Petreski 67'

=== Quarter-finals ===
8 December	Daejeon Citizen	3–1	Ulsan Hyundai Horang-i	Namhae Sports Park
	Kim Sung-keun 1'; Lee Kwan-woo 56'; Kim Eun-jung 74'		Kim Hyun-seok 90+'

8 December	Jeonbuk Hyundai Motors	0–1	Suwon Samsung Bluewings	Namhae Sports Park
			Cho Hyun-doo 29'

8 December	Seongnam Ilhwa Chunma	3–2	Busan I'Cons	Gimcheon Stadium
	Kim Dae-eui 8'; Baek Young-cheol 16'; Shin Tae-yong 68'		Jeon Woo-keun 35'; Yoon Hwi-jun 80'

8 December	Jeonnam Dragons	1–2	Pohang Steelers	Gimcheon Stadium
	Tico Mineiro 15'		Lee Dong-gook 80'; Petreski 89'

=== Semi-finals ===
12 December	Daejeon Citizen	0–1	Suwon Samsung Bluewings	Jeju World Cup Stadium
			Seo Jung-won 81'

12 December	Seongnam Ilhwa Chunma	1–2	Pohang Steelers	Jeju World Cup Stadium
	Kim Woo-jae 30'		Lee Dong-gook 7'; Leonard Bisaku 37'

=== Final ===
15 December	Suwon Samsung Bluewings	1–0	Pohang Steelers	Jeju World Cup Stadium
	Sandro Cardoso 19'

== See also ==
- 2002 K League
- 2002 Korean League Cup
