= Kim Jae-han =

South Korean footballer

Personal information
- Full name: Kim Jae-han
- Date of birth: 1 April 1947 (age 79)
- Place of birth: Gimcheon, Gyeongbuk, Korea
- Height: 1.91 m (6 ft 3 in)
- Position: Centre-forward

College career
Years	Team	Apps	(Gls)
1968–1971	Konkuk University		

Senior career*
Years	Team	Apps	(Gls)
1967	Cheil Industries		
1972–1975	Korea Housing Bank		
1976–1977	Seiko		
1977–1980	Korea Housing Bank		

International career
1972–1979	South Korea	57	(35)

Managerial career
- 1979–1989: Korea Housing Bank
- * Club domestic league appearances and goals

- Kim Jae-han
- Hangul: 김재한
- RR: Gim Jaehan
- MR: Kim Chaehan

Kim Jae-han (born 1 April 1947) is a former South Korean football player.

== Early life ==
Kim decided to be a baseball player in Daegu High School, but his baseball team was disbanded while he attended the school. He changed his career path late to football, and spent his youth career in Seonggwang High School and Konkuk University.

== Playing career ==
Kim joined Korea Housing Bank after graduating from university. In 1972, his team won four national titles, and he was selected for the South Korea national team for the first time.

Kim was picked as a member of the national team for the 1974 FIFA World Cup qualification. He scored against Thailand and Hong Kong, helping South Korea reach the final round. In the two-legged final against Australia, he scored a goal again, but South Korea had to play third game after the aggregate score was tied. They eventually lost the rematch 1–0, failing to qualify for the World Cup.

== Style of play ==
Kim played as a target man by utilising his height, jumping skills and positional sense. He also had the confidence to find the spot where the ball would fall.

== Honours ==
Cheil Industries

- Korean National Championship: 1967
- Korean President's Cup: 1967

Korea Housing Bank

- Korean National Semipro League (Spring): 1972
- Korean National Semipro League (Autumn): 1972
- Korean President's Cup: 1972

Seiko

- Hong Kong FA Cup: 1975–76
- Hong Kong Senior Challenge Shield: 1975–76, 1976–77
- Hong Kong Viceroy Cup runner-up: 1975–76, 1976–77

Individual

- Korean National Semipro League (Spring) top goalscorer: 1972
- Korean FA Best XI: 1972, 1973, 1977, 1978
- Korean FA Most Valuable Player: 1978
