= Kim Jin-kook =

South Korean footballer (born 1951)

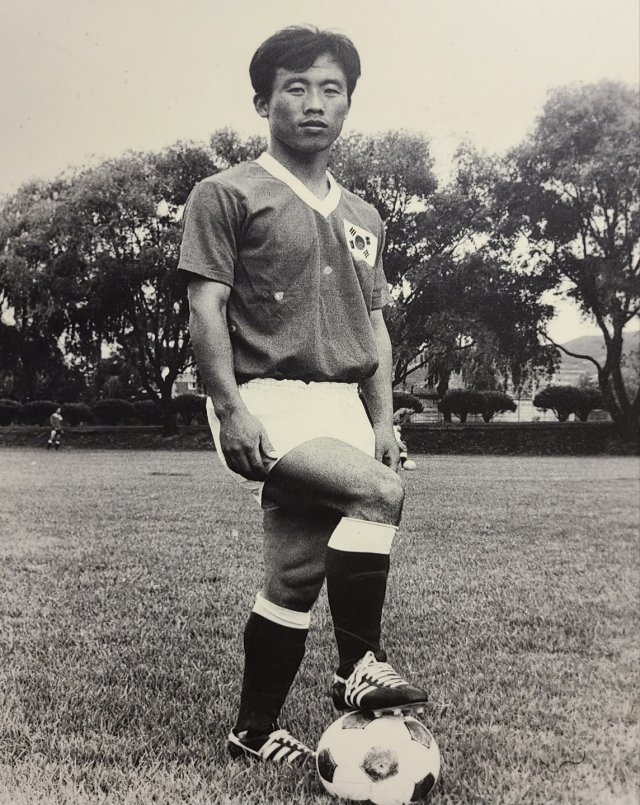
- Kim in 1972

Personal information
- Full name: Kim Jin-kook
- Date of birth: 14 September 1951 (age 75)
- Place of birth: South Korea
- Height: 1.65 m (5 ft 5 in)
- Position: Left winger

College career
Years	Team	Apps	(Gls)
1978–1979	Konkuk University		

Senior career*
Years	Team	Apps	(Gls)
1970–1977	Industrial Bank of Korea		
1973–1975	→ ROK Army (draft)		
1980	Darmstadt 98	4	(0)
1981–1982	Wormatia Worms	27	(0)
1984	Kookmin Bank	15	(2)
Total		46	(2)

International career
1971	South Korea U20		
1972–1977	South Korea	97	(27)

Managerial career
- 1990–1992: Kookmin Bank
Medal record
Men's football
Representing South Korea
AFC Asian Cup
Runner-up	1972 Thailand
AFC Youth Championship
Runner-up	1971 Japan
- * Club domestic league appearances and goals

- Kim Jin-kook
- Hangul: 김진국
- Hanja: 金鎭國
- RR: Gim Jinguk
- MR: Kim Chin'guk

Kim Jin-kook (Korean: 김진국; born on 14 September 1951) is a former South Korean footballer. While Cha Bum-kun played as a right winger for the South Korea national team in the 1970s, Kim was in charge of the left wing. He had a small body, but was skilled in changing directions and delivering crosses. His cross delivered to target man Kim Jae-han was one of South Korea's important tactics. He also played for 2. Bundesliga side Darmstadt 98 and Wormatia Worms in the later years of his career.

== Honours ==
ROK Army

- Korean National Semipro League (Autumn): 1974
- Korean President's Cup: 1975

Industrial Bank of Korea

- Korean National Semipro League (Autumn): 1975
- Korean President's Cup runner-up: 1977

South Korea U20

- AFC Youth Championship runner-up: 1971

South Korea

- AFC Asian Cup runner-up: 1972

Individual

- Korean President's Cup Best Player: 1975
- Korean National Semipro League (Autumn) Best Player: 1975
- Korean FA Best XI: 1975, 1976
