= National Semi-professional Football Championship (South Korea) =

National Semipro Football Championship
- Organiser(s): National Semipro League
- Founded: 1991
- Abolished: 2002
- Region: South Korea
- Most championships: Industrial Bank of Korea (3 titles)

The National Semi-professional Football Championship (Korean: 전국실업축구선수권대회) was an annual competition contested between South Korean semi-professional football clubs from 1991 to 2002. It was the league cup of the National Semi-professional Football League (South Korea), and was also known as the predecessor of the Korea National League Championship.

== Results ==
=== Finals ===
Season	Champions	Score	Runners-up	Ref.
1991	Seoul Trust Bank	2–1	Kookmin Bank	
1992	Industrial Bank of Korea	3–1	Seoul Trust Bank	
1993	Kookmin Bank	4–1 (a.e.t.)	Korea Housing Bank	
1994	Industrial Bank of Korea	1–1	E-Land Puma	
1994	Industrial Bank of Korea	2–0	E-Land Puma	
1995	E-Land Puma	2–0	Kookmin Bank	
1996	Kookmin Bank	1–0	Hanil Life Insurance	
1997	Industrial Bank of Korea	2–1 (a.e.t.)	Hanil Life Insurance	
1998	Hanil Life Insurance	2–1 (a.e.t.)	Hallelujah FC	
1999	Sangmu FC	1–0	Gangneung City	
2000	Gangneung City	1–0	Kookmin Bank	
2001	Sangmu FC	1–0	Gangneung City	
2002	Hyundai Mipo Dockyard	Unknown	Sangmu FC	

=== Titles by club ===
Club	Champions	Runners-up	Seasons won
Industrial Bank of Korea	3	0	1992, 1994, 1997
Kookmin Bank	2	3	1993, 1996
Sangmu FC	2	1	1999, 2001
Hanil Life Insurance	1	2	1998
Gangneung City	1	2	2000
Seoul Trust Bank	1	1	1991
E-Land Puma	1	1	1995
Hyundai Mipo Dockyard	1	0	2002

== Awards ==
Season	Best Player	Top goalscorer	Ref.
1991	Jo Chang-geun (Seoul Trust Bank)	Hwang Deuk-ha (Hallelujah FC, 4 goals)	
1992	Jo Jeong-ho (Industrial Bank of Korea)	Seo Hyo-won (Industrial Bank of Korea, 7 goals)	
1993	Hwang Gwang-soon (Kookmin Bank)	Baek Hyeong-jin (Kookmin Bank, 3 goals)	
1994	Yoo Dong-woo (Industrial Bank of Korea)	Park Doo-jeong (Industrial Bank of Korea, ? goals); Lee Gwang-cheol (E-Land Puma, ? goals)	
1995	Kim Doo-ham (E-Land Puma)	Lee Woo-hyung (Kookmin Bank, 3 goals)	
1996	Lee Hyeon-cheol (Kookmin Bank)	Hwang Gwang-soon (Kookmin Bank, 2 goals)	
1997	Choi Dong-sik (Industrial Bank of Korea)	Park Nam-yeol (Sangmu FC, 4 goals)	
1998	Kim Chang-han (Hanil Life Insurance)	Unknown	
1999	Noh Tae-gyeong (Sangmu FC)	Baek Byeong-joo (Gangneung City, ? goals)	
2000	Park Hyo-jin (Gangneung City)	Park Seong-woon (Gangneung City, 4 goals)	
2001	Jang Sang-won (Sangmu FC)	Kim Hong-gi (Korean Police, 5 goals)	
2002	Kim Young-gi (Hyundai Mipo Dockyard)	Ahn Hong-min (Gangneung City, 6 goals)	

== See also ==
- National Semi-professional Football League (South Korea)
- Korea National League Championship
- Korean League Cup
