= Chohung Bank FC =

1969–1983 South Korean football club

Chohung Bank
- Full name: Chohung Bank FC (조흥은행 축구단)
- Nickname: CH Bank
- Founded: 1969
- Dissolved: 1983

Chohung Bank FC (sometimes known as CH Bank) is a defunct South Korean semi-professional football club that was located in Seoul, South Korea. The club played at the highest level in South Korea in the 1970s, winning the national league on two occasions and the national cup once.

== History ==
Chohung Bank FC was founded on 19 March 1969 by the Chohung Bank, a commercial bank based in Seoul. The club competed in the Korea Semi-Professional Football League which at that time was the highest level league in the South Korean football league system. Many works, banks and military sides competed in the league which was run with Spring and Autumn stages each year. League records indicate that in 1970 Chohung Bank won the Autumn season title and a year later in Autumn 1971 finished runners-up. Their final title was in 1974 when they won the Spring season competition. The club were joint winners of the national cup competition, the Korean National Football Championship in 1973. In 1974, the club toured to India and participated in the DCM Trophy in New Delhi.

The club was disbanded in December 1983 but during its limited 14-year history it was for a short spell in the early 1970s one of the leading sides in South Korea. The club was affiliated to the Korea Football Association.

== Honours ==
- Korea Semi-Professional Football League
  - Champions (2): 1970a, 1974s
  - Runners-up (1): 1971a
- Korean National Football Championship (Former FA Cup)
  - Champions (1): 1973 (Joint)

== Notable players ==
Chohung Bank FC players that have played in the South Korea national team include:

- Hong In-woong
- Kim Jin-bok

== See also ==
- List of South Korean football champions
- List of Korean FA Cup winners
