= Kim Dae-eui =

South Korean footballer (born 1974)

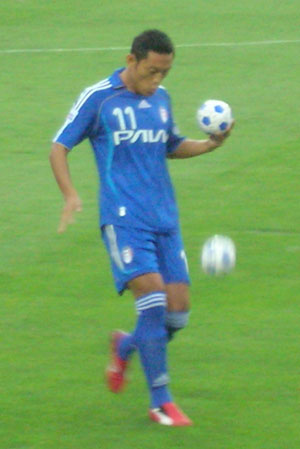
- Kim with Suwon Samsung Bluewings in 2007

Personal information
- Date of birth: 30 May 1974 (age 52)
- Place of birth: Suwon, Gyeonggi, South Korea
- Height: 1.74 m (5 ft 8 1/2 in)
- Position: Winger

Team information
- Current team: Nantong Zhiyun (manager)

College career
Years	Team	Apps	(Gls)
1993–1996	Korea University		

Senior career*
Years	Team	Apps	(Gls)
1997	Hanil Bank		
1998	JEF United Ichihara	4	(0)
1999	Hyundai Mipo Dockyard		
2000–2003	Seongnam Ilhwa Chunma	90	(17)
2004–2010	Suwon Samsung Bluewings	137	(15)
2011	Home United	14	(1)
Total		245	(33)

International career
1992–1993	South Korea U20	9	(1)
1995	South Korea U23	11	(2)
1997	South Korea B		
1997–2004	South Korea	13	(3)

Managerial career
- 2012: Home United
- 2017: Korea University
- 2017–2019: Suwon FC
- 2021–2023: Chengdu Rongcheng (assistant)
- 2024–2025: Suzhou Dongwu
- 2025–: Nantong Zhiyun
Medal record
Representing South Korea
Men's football
Summer Universiade
Silver medal – second place	1997 Sicily
AFC Youth Championship
Runner-up	1992 United Arab Emirates
EAFF Championship
Winner	2003 Japan
- * Club domestic league appearances and goals

- Kim Dae-eui
- Hangul: 김대의
- Hanja: 金大儀
- RR: Gim Daeui
- MR: Kim Taeŭi

Kim Dae-eui (Korean: 김대의; born 30 May 1974) is a South Korean football manager and former player, who is currently the manager of China League One club Nantong Zhiyun.

== Club career ==
South Korea's youth international between 1992 and 1995, Kim could become a professional player at the newly-founded Daejeon Citizen through the K League draft after graduating from Korea University in 1997, but he joined semi-professional club Hanil Bank instead of Daejeon Citizen due to the doubt about the new club's finance. However, the bank's football club was dissolved by the Asian financial crisis that year, and he moved to J.League club JEF United Ichihara the next year.

In the 1998 season, Kim made his professional debut, but he failed to adapt to the Japanese club. In 1999, he signed for another South Korean semi-professional club Hyundai Mipo Dockyard because he was being suspended from the K League for three years for refusing the draft.

In 2000, after his suspension was finished, Kim transferred to K League club Seongnam Ilhwa Chunma. He won the K League Most Valuable Player Award in 2002, while helping Seongnam win three consecutive K League titles from 2001 to 2003. He joined another K League club Suwon Samsung Bluewings in 2004, and won two more league titles.

== Career statistics ==
=== Club ===
Appearances and goals by club, season and competition
Club	Season	League			National cup		League cup		Continental		Other		Total	
Club	Season	Division	Apps	Goals	Apps	Goals	Apps	Goals	Apps	Goals	Apps	Goals	Apps	Goals
Hanil Bank	1997	National Semipro League					(Note: Appearance(s) in Korean National Semipro Championship)		—		—			
JEF United Ichihara	1998	J.League	4	0			2	1	—		—		6	1
Hyundai Mipo Dockyard	1999	National Semipro League							—		—			
Seongnam Ilhwa Chunma	2000	K League	17	4			5	1	(Note: Appearance(s) in Asian Cup Winners' Cup)		2 (Note: Appearances in K League Championship)	0	24	5
Seongnam Ilhwa Chunma	2001	K League	21	1			9	1	—		—		30	2
Seongnam Ilhwa Chunma	2002	K League	27	9			11	8	—				38	17
Seongnam Ilhwa Chunma	2003	K League	25	3			—		(Note: Appearance(s) in AFC Champions League)		(Note: Appearance(s) in A3 Champions Cup)		25	3
Seongnam Ilhwa Chunma	Total		90	17			25	10			2	0	117	27
Suwon Samsung Bluewings	2004	K League	23	3			10	4	—		3	0	36	7
Suwon Samsung Bluewings	2005	K League	18	3			7	2					25	5
Suwon Samsung Bluewings	2006	K League	22	3			11	2	—		3	0	36	5
Suwon Samsung Bluewings	2007	K League	20	4			7	1	—		0	0	27	5
Suwon Samsung Bluewings	2008	K League	21	1			7	0	—		2	0	30	1
Suwon Samsung Bluewings	2009	K League	26	1			0	0			2 (Note: Appearances in Pan-Pacific Championship)	0	28	1
Suwon Samsung Bluewings	2010	K League	7	0			4	0			—		11	0
Suwon Samsung Bluewings	Total		137	15			46	9			10	0	193	24
Home United	2011	S.League	14	1	1	0	0	0	—		0	0	15	1
Career total			245	33	1	0	73	20			12	0	331	53

=== International ===
Appearances and goals by national team and year
National team	Year	Apps	Goals
South Korea	1997	2	0
South Korea	2002	1	0
South Korea	2003	9	3
South Korea	2004	1	0
Total		13	3

Results list South Korea's goal tally first.

List of international goals scored by Kim Dae-eui
No.	Date	Venue	Opponent	Score	Result	Competition
1	25 September 2003	Incheon, South Korea	Vietnam	4–0	5–0	2004 AFC Asian Cup qualification
2	29 September 2003	Incheon, South Korea	Nepal	1–0	16–0	2004 AFC Asian Cup qualification
3	29 September 2003	Incheon, South Korea	Nepal	5–0	16–0	2004 AFC Asian Cup qualification

== Honours ==
JEF United Ichihara

- J.League Cup runner-up: 1998

Hyundai Mipo Dockyard

- Korean National Semipro League (Spring): 1999

Seongnam Ilhwa Chunma

- K League 1: 2001, 2002, 2003
- Korean League Cup: 2002
- Korean Super Cup: 2002
- Korean FA Cup runner-up: 2000

Suwon Samsung Bluewings

- K League 1: 2004, 2008
- Korean FA Cup: 2009
- Korean League Cup: 2005, 2008
- Korean Super Cup: 2005
- A3 Champions Cup: 2005
- Pan-Pacific Championship: 2009

Home United

- Singapore Cup: 2011

South Korea U20

- AFC Youth Championship runner-up: 1992

South Korea B

- Summer Universiade silver medal: 1997

South Korea

- EAFF Championship: 2003

Individual

- Korean National Semipro League (Spring) Best Player: 1999
- K League 1 Most Valuable Player: 2002
- K League 1 Best XI: 2002, 2004
- K League All-Star: 2005
