= Choi Duck-joo =

South Korean football manager

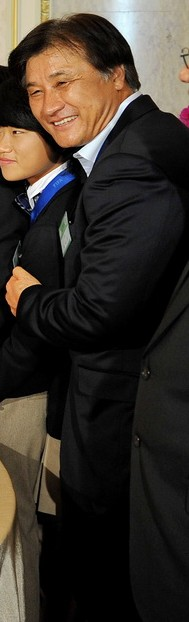
- Choi in 2010

Personal information
- Date of birth: 3 January 1960 (age 66)
- Place of birth: Tongyeong, South Gyeongsang, South Korea
- Height: 1.78 m (5 ft 10 in)
- Position: Forward

Team information
- Current team: Daegu FC

Youth career
- 1980–1983: Chungang University

Senior career*
Years	Team	Apps	(Gls)
1984	Hanil Bank	19	(7)
1985	POSCO Atoms	8	(0)
1987–1988	Matsushita Electric Industrial		

Managerial career
- 2009–2010: South Korea Women's U-17
- 2011: South Korea Women's U-20
- 2012–2013: South Korea (assistant)
- 2014–: Daegu FC
- * Club domestic league appearances and goals as of January 8, 2012 ‡ National team caps and goals as of January 8, 2012

- Choi Duck-joo
- Hangul: 최덕주
- Hanja: 崔德柱
- RR: Choe Deokju
- MR: Ch'oe Tŏkchu

Choi Duck-joo (Korean: 최덕주, born 3 January 1960) is a South Korean football former player, coach and current manager of Daegu FC. He managed South Korea women's U-17 team when they won the 2010 U-17 Women's World Cup.
