= Korean National Football Championship =

National Football Championship
- Organiser(s): Korea Football Association
- Founded: 1946
- Abolished: 2000
- Region: South Korea
- Related competitions: Korea Cup
- Most championships: Korea University (5 titles)

The National Football Championship (Korean: 전국축구선수권대회) was a South Korean football competition for semi-professional and amateur senior football clubs. It was held annually in the second half of the year. This competition was originally one of major club competitions of South Korean football, but its status was undermined after the professional clubs appeared in South Korea with the foundation of the K League.

== Results ==
=== Finals ===
Season	Champions	Score	Runners-up	Ref.
1946	Joil Brewery	6–2	Seoul National University (Note: Commercial college of Seoul National University)	
1947	Cancelled due to the death of Joseon Sports Council president			
1948	Yonhi University	3–0	Sungkyunkwan University	
1949	Joseon Electrical Industry	3–2	Yonhi University	
1950	Cancelled due to Korean War			
1951	Joseon Textile	1–0	ROK Air Force	
1952	Joseon Textile	4–0	ROK Military Police Command	
1953	ROK Army Quartermaster Corps	2–0	ROK Marine Corps	
1954	ROK Military Police Command	2–1	ROK Army CIC	
1955	Ceased due to controversial refereeing decisions			
1956	ROK Army Quartermaster Corps	Unknown	ROK Army OPMG	
1957	ROK Army CIC	Unknown	ROK Marine Corps	
1958	ROK Army Quartermaster Corps	3–2 (a.e.t.)	ROK Army OPMG	
1959	ROK Army CIC	Round-robin	ROK Marine Corps; ROK Army OPMG	
1960	Kyung Hee University	1–0 (a.e.t.)	Korea Tungsten	
1961	Kyung Hee University	Unknown	ROK Army OPMG	
1962 (Note: Held in combination with Korean President's Cup.)	Korea Electric Power	1–0 (a.e.t.)	Korea Tungsten	
1963	Korea University	1–1 (a.e.t.) (Note: Champions were decided by a draw.)	ROK Army Quartermaster Corps	
1964	Korea Coal Corporation	3–2	Korea Electric Power	
1965	Korea Electric Power	1–0	Keumsung Textile	
1966	Cheil Industries	1–0	Chung-Ang University	
1967	Cheil Industries	1–0	Korea Electric Power	
1968	Yangzee	1–0 (a.e.t.)	Korea Tungsten	
1969	ROK Army	1–0	ROK Marine Corps	
1970	ROK Army	0–0 (a.e.t.) (4–3 p)	Korea Housing Bank	
1971	Korea University	2–0	Korea Trust Bank	
1972	Cancelled due to financial problems of participating teams			
1973	ROK Navy; Chohung Bank	0–0 (a.e.t.)	—	
1974	Korea University	Awarded	Yonsei University	
1975	ROK Army	1–0	Korea University	
1976	Korea University	2–1 (a.e.t.)	ROK Air Force	
1977	Konkuk University	2–0	POSCO FC	
1978	Kookmin Bank	1–0	Chung-Ang University	
1979	ROK Army	3–0	Myongji University	
1980	Seoul City	1–1 (a.e.t.)	Hanyang University	
1980	Seoul City	1–1 (a.e.t.) (4–3 p)	Hanyang University	
1981	Konkuk University	1–1 (a.e.t.)	Korea University	
1981	Konkuk University	2–1	Korea University	
1982	Seoul City	4–1	Korea Electric Power	
1983	Hanyang University	2–0	Seoul Trust Bank	
1984	Yonsei University	2–0	Chung-Ang University	
1985	Korea University	2–0	POSCO Atoms B	
1986	Seoul City	3–1	Ajou University	
1987	Sungkyunkwan University	2–1	Yonsei University	
1988	Lucky-Goldstar Hwangso	2–1	Daewoo Royals	
1989	Daewoo Royals	1–0	Hyundai Horang-i	
1989	Daewoo Royals	1–1	Hyundai Horang-i	
1990	Daewoo Royals B	3–2	Incheon National University	
1991	Industrial Bank of Korea	0–0 (a.e.t.) (4–2 p)	Hallelujah FC	
1992	Hanyang University	0–0 (a.e.t.) (3–2 p)	Daegu University	
1993	Industrial Bank of Korea	2–0	Daegu University	
1994	E-Land Puma	1–0	Hallelujah FC	
1995	E-Land Puma	2–1	Hallelujah FC	
1996	Sangmu FC	3–2	E-Land Puma	
1997	Hanil Life Insurance	3–2 (a.e.t.)	Hallelujah FC	
1998	Hanil Life Insurance	2–1	Hallelujah FC	
1999	Ajou University	2–1 (a.e.t.)	Ulsan Hyundai Horang-i B	
2000	Hyundai Mipo Dockyard	3–0	Korea Railroad	

=== Titles by club ===
Year	Champions	Runners-up	Seasons won
Korea University	5	2	1963, 1971, 1974, 1976, 1985
ROK Army	4	0	1969, 1970, 1975, 1979
ROK Army Quartermaster Corps	3	1	1953, 1956, 1958
Seoul City	3	0	1980, 1982, 1986
Yonsei University	2	3	1948, 1984
Korea Electric Power	2	3	1962, 1965
ROK Army CIC	2	1	1957, 1959
Hanyang University	2	1	1983, 1992
Daewoo Royals	2	1	1989, 1990
E-Land Puma	2	1	1994, 1995
Joseon Textile	2	0	1951, 1952
Kyung Hee University	2	0	1960, 1961
Cheil Industries	2	0	1966, 1967
Konkuk University	2	0	1977, 1981
Industrial Bank of Korea	2	0	1991, 1993
Hanil Life Insurance	2	0	1997, 1998
ROK Army OPMG	1	5	1954
ROK Navy	1	4	1973
Sungkyunkwan University	1	1	1987
Ajou University	1	1	1999
Joil Brewery	1	0	1946
Joseon Electrical Industry	1	0	1949
Korea Coal Corporation	1	0	1964
Yangzee	1	0	1968
Chohung Bank	1	0	1973
Kookmin Bank	1	0	1978
Lucky-Goldstar Hwangso	1	0	1988
Sangmu FC	1	0	1996
Hyundai Mipo Dockyard	1	0	2000

== Awards ==
Season	Best Player	Top goalscorer	Best Manager	Ref.
1966	Kim Ki-bok (Chung-Ang University)	Unknown	Unknown	
Unknown from 1967 to 1971
1973	Hong In-woong (Chohung Bank)	Park Su-deok (ROK Navy, 3 goals)	Jo Nam-soo (Chohung Bank)	
1974	Choi Jong-duk (Korea University)	Huh Jung-moo (Yonsei University, 5 goals)	Park Dae-jong (Korea University)	
1975	Park Sang-in (ROK Army)	Shin Dong-min (ROK Army, 4 goals)	Sung Nak-woon (ROK Army)	
1976	Park Sung-hwa (Korea University)	Unknown	Park Young-hwan (Korea University)	
1977	Oh Seok-jae (Konkuk University)	Oh Seok-jae (Konkuk University, 6 goals)	Park Gyeong-hwa (Konkuk University)	
1978	Noh Heung-seop (Kookmin Bank)	Unknown	An Gyeong-cheol (Kookmin Bank)	
1979	Lee Young-moo (ROK Army)	Unknown	Unknown	
1980	Lee Tae-yeop (Seoul City)	Unknown	Park Jong-hwan (Seoul City)	
1981	Seo Seok-beom (Konkuk University)	Unknown	Jeong Jong-deok (Konkuk University)	
1982	Park Yoon-ki (Seoul City)	Lee Tae-hee (Seoul City, 4 goals)	Park Jong-hwan (Seoul City)	
1983	Baek Chi-soo (Hanyang University)	Han Young-soo (ROK Army, 3 goals)	Bae Gi-myeon (Hanyang University)	
1984	Choi Yong-gil (Yonsei University)	Choi Geon-taek (Chung-Ang University, 4 goals)	Jung Byung-tak (Yonsei University)	
1985	Park Yang-ha (Korea University)	Choi Jong-gap (Korea First Bank, 6 goals); Lee Yong-ju (Korea Electric Power, 6 goals)	Nam Dae-sik (Korea University)	
1986	Lee Chil-seong (Seoul City)	Kim Young-joo (Seoul City, 3 goals)	Shin Yoon-gi (Seoul City)	
1987	Shin Hyun-joon (Sungkyunkwan University)	Kim Bong-gil (Yonsei University, 5 goals)	Jeong Ho-seon (Sungkyunkwan University)	
1988	Cho Min-kook (Lucky-Goldstar Hwangso)	An Seong-il (Ajou University, 5 goals)	Ko Jae-wook (Lucky-Goldstar Hwangso)	
1989	Lee Tae-ho (Daewoo Royals)	Lee Tae-ho (Daewoo Royals, 5 goals)	Lee Cha-man (Daewoo Royals)	
1990	Ha Seok-ju (Daewoo Royals B)	Ha Seok-ju (Daewoo Royals B, 5 goals)	Cho Kwang-rae (Daewoo Royals B)	
1991	Jo Jeong-ho (Industrial Bank of Korea)	Park Guk-chang (Industrial Bank of Korea, 4 goals)	Choi Gil-soo (Industrial Bank of Korea)	
1992	Kim Seung-an (Hanyang University)	Hong Deok-jin (Dankook University, 4 goals)	Han Moon-bae (Hanyang University)	
1993	Park Guk-chang (Industrial Bank of Korea)	Park Guk-chang (Industrial Bank of Korea, 5 goals)	Choi Gil-soo (Industrial Bank of Korea)	
1994	Park Kun-ha (E-Land Puma)	Park Kun-ha (E-Land Puma, 6 goals)	Lee Young-moo (E-Land Puma)	
1995	Kim In-seong (E-Land Puma)	Park Kun-ha (E-Land Puma, 4 goals)	Unknown	
1996	Choi Moon-sik (Sangmu FC)	Unknown	Lee Kang-jo (Sangmu FC)	
1997	Ahn Seung-in (Hanil Life Insurance)	Jin Soon-jin (Hallelujah FC, 6 goals)	Unknown	
1998	Kim Chang-han (Hanil Life Insurance)	Unknown	Unknown	
1999	Unknown	Unknown	Unknown	
2000	Kim Young-gi (Hyundai Mipo Dockyard)	Kim Young-gi (Hyundai Mipo Dockyard, 7 goals)	Unknown	

== See also ==
- List of Korea Cup winners
- Korea Cup (domestic)
- All Joseon Football Championship
- Korean President's Cup
- National Semi-professional Football League (South Korea)
