= Yangzee FC =

1967–1970 South Korean football club

Yangzee
- Full name: Yangzee Football Club
- Founded: 1967
- Dissolved: 1970
- Owner: Korean Central Intelligence Agency
Home colours	Away colours

Yangzee Football Club (Korean: 양지 축구단) was a South Korean football club.

== History ==
Yangzee was a special football club aimed at anti-communism, and was founded by the Korean Central Intelligence Agency (KCIA) on 29 March 1967, after the North Korea national football team reached the quarter-finals in the 1966 FIFA World Cup. Under the then-head of the KCIA Kim Hyong-uk, the club was charged with improving the level of football in South Korea, recruiting the best talent of the time. Participation in the squad served as an alternative to the mandatory military service requirement for Korean nationals. During their time with the team, the players lived and trained at the headquarters of the Intelligence Agency. They also received high salaries and long-term overseas training in return for intensive training. The team dominated the domestic football scene at the time, and in 1969 reached the final of the Asian Club Championship, losing 1–0 to Maccabi Tel Aviv in the final. As Kim's grip on power at the Intelligence Agency slipped away, and interest in the football club waned as relations towards North Korea improved, the team was wound up on 17 March 1970.

== Managers ==
- (South Korea) Choi Chung-min
- (South Korea) Kim Yong-sik

== Honours ==
=== Continental ===
- Asian Champion Club Tournament

Runners-up: 1969

=== Domestic ===
- Korean National Championship

Champions: 1968

- Korean President's Cup

Champions: 1968

=== Minor competitions ===
- Pestabola Merdeka: 1967 (Note: Also recognised as the result of the South Korea national football team.)

== See also ==
- History of the South Korea national football team
- North Korea–South Korea football rivalry
