= Shin Moon-sun =

South Korean footballer (born 1958)

Shin Moon-Sun 신문선
Personal information
- Full name: Shin Moon-Sun
- Date of birth: March 11, 1958 (age 68)

Youth career
- 1980–1983: Yonsei University

Senior career*
Years	Team	Apps	(Gls)
1981–1982	Daewoo Royals	84	(7)
1983–1985	Yukong Elephants	18	(0)
- * Club domestic league appearances and goals as of 30 June 2017

Shin Moon-Sun (Korean: 신문선, born March 11, 1958) is a soccer player from South Korea. He is also a professor at the Graduate School of Record Information Science at Myung-ji University and also works as a sports commentator.

== Education ==
- Cheongpa Elementary School in Seoul.
- Seoul Physical Education Middle School.
- Seoul Physical Education High School.
- Majored in Physical Education at Yonsei University.
- Majored in Physical Education at graduate school of education Yonsei University.
- Majored in Sport Management at graduate school in Sejong University.

== Club career ==
He was the founding member of Yukong Kokkiri
