= E-Land Puma FC =

1992–1998 South Korean football club

E-Land Puma 이랜드 푸마
- Full name: E-Land Puma Football Club 이랜드 푸마 축구단
- Founded: 1992
- Dissolved: 1998

E-Land Puma FC (Korean: 이랜드 푸마) was a South Korean semi-professional football club. The club was officially founded in December 1992, by the E-Land.

The club played in the Korean FA Cup in 1996 and 1997 against top division teams.

== Honours ==
=== Domestic ===
==== Amateur ====
- Korean National Semi-Professional Football League: 1995 Spring, 1996 Spring
- Korean National Football Championship: 1994, 1995
- Korean National Semi-Professional Football Championship: 1995
- Korean President's Cup National Football Tournament: 1994

== Notable players ==
- Chung Jung-yong
- Park Kun-ha
- Je Yong-sam
- In Chang-soo

== See also ==
- Seoul E-Land FC
