= Lee Tae-yeop =

South Korean footballer

Personal information
- Date of birth: 16 June 1959 (age 67)
- Place of birth: South Korea
- Position: Forward

Youth career
- University of Seoul

Senior career*
Years	Team	Apps	(Gls)
1980–1981	Seoul FC		

International career
1980–1981	South Korea	6	(2)

Managerial career
- 2016–: Yeonggwang FC
- * Club domestic league appearances and goals

- Lee Tae-yeop
- Hangul: 이태엽
- Hanja: 李太燁
- RR: I Taeyeop
- MR: I T'aeyŏp

Lee Tae-yeop (born June 16, 1959) is a Korean football forward who played for South Korea in the 1980 President's Cup and the 1980 Asian Cup. He also played for Seoul City.

Since March 2016, he has been the manager of Yeonggwang FC in the K3 League.

== International record ==
Year	Apps	Goal
1980	3	1
1981	3	1
Total	6	2
