= Seo Ki-bok =

South Korean footballer (born 1979)

Personal information
- Date of birth: January 28, 1979 (age 47)
- Place of birth: Incheon, South Korea
- Height: 1.73 m (5 ft 8 in)
- Position: Midfielder

Youth career
- 1997–2000: Yonsei University

Senior career*
Years	Team	Apps	(Gls)
2001–2002	Sangmu (Army)		
2003	Jeonbuk Hyundai Motors	17	(0)
2004–2007	Incheon United	29	(1)

International career^{‡}
1996–1999	South Korea U-20	6	(2)
1998–1999	South Korea U-23	8	(2)
1998	South Korea	2	(0)

Managerial career
- 2008: Incheon United U-12
- * Club domestic league appearances and goals as of 4 July 2011 ‡ National team caps and goals as of 4 July 2007

- Seo Ki-bok
- Hangul: 서기복
- Hanja: 徐基復
- RR: Seo Gibok
- MR: Sŏ Kibok

Seo Ki-bok (Korean: 서기복; born January 28, 1979) is a former South Korean football player who plays at midfielder.

He played in 1999 FIFA World Youth Championship with Seol Ki-hyeon, Lee Dong-gook. And he scored against Mali.

He was part of the South Korea U-23 team, who finished third in Group A.

== Club career ==
- 2001–2002 Sangmu - army
- 2003 Jeonbuk Hyundai Motors
- 2004–2007 Incheon United
