= Industrial Bank of Korea FC =

1969–1997 South Korean football club

Industrial Bank of Korea
- Full name: Industrial Bank of Korea FC (중소기업은행 축구단)
- Founded: 1969
- Dissolved: 1997

Industrial Bank of Korea FC (Korean: 중소기업은행 축구단) was a South Korean semi-professional football club. The club was officially founded in 1969, by the Industrial Bank of Korea. The club played in the 1997 Korean FA Cup where they lost in the round of 16.

== Honours ==
=== Domestic ===
- Korea Semi-Professional Football League :
  - Champions (11): 1975a, 1979s, 1985s, 1989s, 1990s, 1990a, 1991s, 1992a, 1994a, 1995a, 1997s
  - Runners-up (2): 1988s, 1994s
- Korean National Football Championship (Former FA Cup):
  - Champions (2): 1991, 1993
- Korean President's Cup National Football Tournament :
  - Champions (1): 1981
  - Runners-up (1): 1977

=== Invitational ===
- DCM Trophy
  - Runners-up (1): 1987

== Notable players ==
- Kim Jin-kook
- Jung Jae-Kwon
