= Hanil Life Insurance FC =

1996–1998 South Korean football club

- Full name: Hanil Life Insurance Company FC (한일생명보험 축구단)
- Founded: 1996
- Dissolved: 1998

Hanil Life Insurance Company FC (Korean: 한일생명보험 축구단) was a South Korean semi-professional football club. They played in the Korean Cup in 1997, losing in the second round to Suwon Samsung Bluewings. They were dissolved in 1998.

== Honours ==
=== Domestic ===
- Korea Semi-Professional Football League Winners (2) : 1997 Autumn, 1998 Spring
- Korean National Football Championship Winners (2) : 1997, 1998
