= Choi Gil-soo =

South Korean football referee (born 1944)

- Born: November 12, 1944 (age 81)

International
Years	League	Role
1988–1991	FIFA	Referee

Choi Gil-Soo (born November 12, 1944) is a former football referee from South Korea. He officiated at the 1988 Olympic tournament in Seoul.
