= Housing & Commercial Bank FC =

1969–1998 South Korean football club

Housing & Commercial Bank
- Full name: Housing & Commercial Bank FC (한국주택은행 축구단)
- Founded: 1969
- Dissolved: 1998

Housing & Commercial Bank FC is defunct South Korean semi-professional football club. The club played in the 1997 Korean FA Cup, where they reached the quarter-finals.

== Honours ==
- Korea Semi-Professional Football League :
  - Champions (4): 1972s, 1972a, 1986s, 1998s
  - Runners-up (4): 1971s, 1984, 1990s, 1994a
- Korean National Football Championship (Former FA Cup):
  - Runners-up (1): 1994
- Korean President's Cup National Football Tournament :
  - Champions (4): 1972, 1992, 1996, 1997, 1998
  - Runners-up (1): 1995
