= Korea Tungsten Company FC =

1956–1972 South Korean football club

Korea Tungsten
- Full name: Korea Tungsten Company FC (대한중석 축구단)
- Founded: 1956
- Dissolved: 1972
- Ground: Yeongwol, Gangwon
- Chairman: (South Korea) Park Tae-joon
- Manager: (South Korea) Han Hong-gi

Korea Tungsten Company FC is a defunct South Korean semi-professional football club that was based in Yeongwol, Gangwon. The club was officially founded in 1956, by the Korea Tungsten Company.

Korea Tungsten Company is rated as predecessor of POSCO, and Daehan Tungsten FC is predecessor of POSCO Atoms, too.

== Honours ==
=== Domestic ===
- Korean President's Cup
  - Winner (2) : 1965, 1966
  - Runner-up (1) : 1962
- Korean National Football Championship
  - Runner-up (2) : 1962, 1968

=== Asia ===
- Asian Club Championship 1967: Semifinalist
