= Hanil Bank FC =

1970–1997 South Korean football club

- Full name: Hanil Bank Football Club 한일은행 축구단
- Founded: 1970
- Dissolved: 1997
- Manager: Kim Ho

Hanil Bank Football Club (Korean: 한일은행 축구단) is a defunct football club in South Korea. The side spent three seasons in the top-tier K League from 1984 to 1986. It was led by Kim Ho, who later coached the Daejeon Citizen and Suwon Samsung Bluewings. Hanil Bank was dissolved in December 1998.

== Statistics ==
| Season | K-League | | | | | | | | | | | Top scorer (League goals) | Manager |
| Season | Stage | Teams | P | W | D | L | GF | GA | GD | Pts | Position | Top scorer (League goals) | Manager |
|---|---|---|---|---|---|---|---|---|---|---|---|---|---|
| 1984 | First stage | 8 | 14 | 3 | 4 | 7 | 14 | 26 | −12 | 17 | 7th | (South Korea) Choi Deok-Ju (7) (South Korea) Wang Sun-jae (7) | (South Korea) Kim Ho |
| 1984 | Second stage | 8 | 14 | 2 | 7 | 5 | 12 | 19 | −7 | 17 | 6th | (South Korea) Choi Deok-Ju (7) (South Korea) Wang Sun-jae (7) | (South Korea) Kim Ho |
| 1985 | Full League | 8 | 21 | 3 | 10 | 8 | 18 | 30 | −12 | 16 | 7th | (South Korea) Cho Seong-kyu (3) (South Korea) Choi Yeong-hoi (3) | (South Korea) Kim Ho |
| 1986 | First stage | 6 | 10 | 3 | 3 | 4 | 9 | 10 | −1 | 9 | 5th | (South Korea) Yoon Sung-hyo (5) | (South Korea) Kim Ho |
| 1986 | Second stage | 6 | 10 | 1 | 1 | 8 | 8 | 23 | −15 | 3 | 6th | (South Korea) Yoon Sung-hyo (5) | (South Korea) Kim Ho |
| Total | | | 69 | 12 | 25 | 32 | 61 | 108 | −47 | 62 | | | |

== Managers ==
- 1970–1983: (South Korea) Kang Jun-young
- 1983–1987 (South Korea) Kim Ho
- 1993: (South Korea) Cho Seong-kyu
