= Seoul FC =

1946–2003 South Korean football club

Seoul Metropolitan Government FC 서울시청 FC
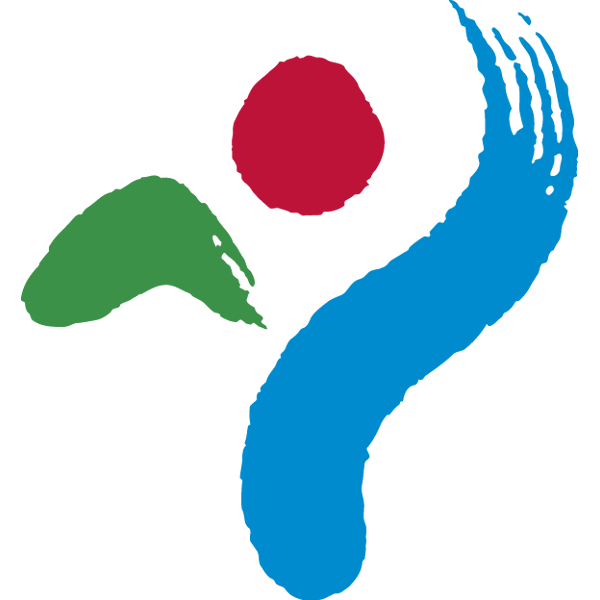
- Full name: Seoul Metropolitan Government Football Club 서울시청 축구단
- Founded: 1946 (original, dissolved in 1950); 1976 (refounded)
- Dissolved: 2003
- Ground: Mokdong Stadium
- Capacity: 21,500 Seats
- League: National League
- 2003 Season: 7th
Home colours	Away colours

Seoul Metropolitan Government Football Club was a South Korean semi-professional football club that competed for 27 years in the semi-professional division. It was owned and funded by Seoul Metropolitan Government.

The club was founded on January 15, 1976, and joined the second stage of the 2003 National League season as temporary replacements for Hallelujah FC. Despite a reasonable mid-table finish, the club withdrew from the league as Hallelujah wanted to return for the 2004 season, and Seoul City were officially wound up on December 31, 2003.

== Honours ==
=== Domestic competitions ===
==== League ====
- Korean National Semi-Professional Football League
  - Winners (5): 1978 Spring, 1980 Spring, 1985 Autumn, 1988 Spring, 1989 Autumn

==== Cups ====
- National Football Championship
  - Winners (3): 1980, 1982, 1986

=== Invitational ===
- Bangladesh President's Gold Cup
  - Champions (1): 1981

== See also ==
- Seoul WFC
