= South Korea national football team results (1970–1979) =

- Win Draw Loss

This is a list of football games played by the South Korea national football team between 1970 and 1979.

== Results by year ==
Year	Pld	W	D	L	Win %
1970	19	12	6	1	63.16
1971	17	9	5	3	52.94
1972	24	12	7	5	50.00
1973	17	10	5	2	58.82
1974	14	6	3	5	42.86
1975	23	18	1	4	78.26
1976	20	11	6	3	55.00
1977	26	16	9	1	61.54
1978	20	18	2	0	90.00
1979	6	5	0	1	83.33
Total	186	117	44	25	62.90

== Matches ==
=== 1970 ===
31 July 1970 Merdeka Tournament	South Korea	0–0	Thailand	Kuala Lumpur, Malaysia

2 August 1970 Merdeka Tournament	South Korea	1–1	Japan	Kuala Lumpur, Malaysia
	Park Lee-chun 89'		Kimura 60'

4 August 1970 Merdeka Tournament	South Korea	4–0	Singapore	Penang, Malaysia
	Lee Hoe-taik 44'; Jeong Kang-ji 51', 70'; Seo Yoon-chan 75'

6 August 1970 Merdeka Tournament	South Korea	2–1	Indonesia	Kuala Lumpur, Malaysia
	Kim Chang-il 49'; Jeong Kang-ji 68'		Kadir 62'

9 August 1970 Merdeka Tournament	South Korea	0–0	Hong Kong	Kuala Lumpur, Malaysia

13 August 1970 Merdeka Tournament	South Korea	3–2	India	Kuala Lumpur, Malaysia
	Jeong Kang-ji 65'; Park Lee-chun 67'; Lee Hoe-taik 76'		Bhowmick 16'; Habib 25'

16 August 1970 Merdeka Tournament	South Korea	1–0	Burma	Kuala Lumpur, Malaysia
	Lee Hoe-taik 43'

10 November 1970 King's Cup	South Korea	3–0	Hong Kong	Bangkok, Thailand
	Kim Ki-bok 71'; Lee Hoe-taik 73'; Park Lee-chun 76'

12 November 1970 King's Cup	South Korea	4–0	Laos	Bangkok, Thailand
	Seo Yoon-chan 58', 80'; Park Su-deok 60', 86'

14 November 1970 King's Cup	Thailand	0–0	South Korea	Bangkok, Thailand

16 November 1970 King's Cup	South Korea	4–0	Singapore	Bangkok, Thailand
	Park Su-deok 7', 79'; Park Lee-chun 71', 73'

18 November 1970 King's Cup	South Korea	2–0	Malaysia	Bangkok, Thailand
	Park Lee-chun 80'; Kim Ki-bok 87'

20 November 1970 King's Cup	Thailand	0–1	South Korea	Bangkok, Thailand
			Park Su-deok 80'

11 December 1970 Asian Games (Preliminary Group C)	South Korea	1–0	Iran	Bangkok, Thailand
	Lee Hoe-taik 52'

13 December 1970 Asian Games (Preliminary Group C)	South Korea	0–0	Indonesia	Bangkok, Thailand

15 December 1970 Asian Games (Group B)	Thailand	1–2	South Korea	Bangkok, Thailand
	Chatchai 65'		Park Lee-chun 8'; Park Soo-il 21'

17 December 1970 Asian Games (Group B)	South Korea	0–1	Burma	Bangkok, Thailand
			Maung Hla Htay 70'

18 December 1970 Asian Games (Semi-finals)	South Korea	2–1 (a.e.t.)	Japan	Bangkok, Thailand
	Jeong Kang-ji 40'; Park Lee-chun 114'		Ueda 73'

20 December 1970 Asian Games (Final)	South Korea	0–0 (a.e.t.)	Burma	Bangkok, Thailand

=== 1971 ===
10 February Friendly	Peru	4–0	South Korea	Lima, Peru
	Mifflin 21'; Sotil 55'; Cubillas 61', 75'

2 May 1971 Korea Cup	South Korea	1–0	Thailand	Seoul, South Korea
	Park Lee-chun 73'			Stadium: Dongdaemun Stadium

6 May 1971 Korea Cup	South Korea	5–1	Malaysia	Seoul, South Korea
	Jeong Kang-ji 15', 37'; Park Lee-chun 22'; Kim Ki-bok 44'; Jeong Gyu-poong 64'		Hamzah 48'	Stadium: Dongdaemun Stadium

9 May 1971 Korea Cup	South Korea	2–0	Khmer Republic	Seoul, South Korea
	Lee Hoe-taik 38', 67'			Stadium: Dongdaemun Stadium

11 May 1971 Korea Cup	South Korea	3–0	Indonesia	Seoul, South Korea
	Jeong Gyu-poong 12', 66'; 우쟈트 31' (o.g.)			Stadium: Dongdaemun Stadium

13 May 1971 Korea Cup	South Korea	0–0	Burma	Seoul, South Korea
				Stadium: Dongdaemun Stadium

15 May 1971 Korea Cup	South Korea	0–0 (a.e.t.)	Burma	Seoul, South Korea
				Stadium: Dongdaemun Stadium

10 September Friendly	South Korea	2–0	Iran	Seoul, South Korea
	Jeong Gyu-poong 8'; Park Lee-chun 12'

12 September Friendly	South Korea	0–2	Iran	Seoul, South Korea
			Khorshidi 38'; Kim Ho 41' (o.g.)

25 September 1972 Summer Olympics (Qualification)	South Korea	0–1	Malaysia	Seoul, South Korea
			Syed 51'

29 September 1972 Summer Olympics (Qualification)	South Korea	6–0	Philippines	Seoul, South Korea
	Park Su-deok 49', 55', 85'; Jeong Gyu-poong 60'; Choi Jae-mo 65' (pen.); Lee Cha-man 70'

2 October 1972 Summer Olympics (Qualification)	South Korea	2–1	Japan	Seoul, South Korea
	Park Su-deok 47'; Jeong Gyu-poong 83'		Nagai 51'

4 October 1972 Summer Olympics (Qualification)	South Korea	8–0	Republic of China	Seoul, South Korea
	Jeong Gyu-poong 7', 89'; Park Su-deok 11', 58'; Jeong Kang-ji 26'; Park Lee-chun 33'; Lee Cha-man 68'; Kim Gi-hyo 84'

8 November 1971 King's Cup	South Korea	2–2	Malaysia	Bangkok, Thailand
	Jeong Gyu-poong 16'; Park Su-deok 31'		Lun Tek 13'; Saharuddin 66'

12 November 1971 King's Cup	South Korea	0–0	Indonesia	Bangkok, Thailand

14 November 1971 King's Cup	South Korea	1–1 (a.e.t.) (2–1 p)	South Vietnam	Bangkok, Thailand
	Kim Chang-il 68'		Thiet An Tran 16'
	Penalties
	Park Lee-chun (penalty scored); Jeong Gyu-poong (penalty missed); Lee Cha-man (penalty missed); Kim Chang-il (penalty scored); Park Su-deok (penalty missed)		(penalty missed) Vo Ba Hung; (penalty scored) Tran Van Kinh; (penalty missed) Nguyen VanNgon; (penalty missed) Tran Tiet Anh; (penalty missed) Du Tan

16 November 1971 King's Cup	Thailand	0–1	South Korea	Bangkok, Thailand
			Jeong Gyu-poong 63'

=== 1972 ===
7 May 1972 AFC Asian Cup (Group allocation match)	South Korea	0–0 (2–4 p)	Iraq	Bangkok, Thailand
	Penalties
			(penalty scored) Aziz; (penalty scored) Nouri; (penalty scored) Kadhim; (penalty scored) Fathi

10 May 1972 AFC Asian Cup (Group B)	South Korea	4–1	Khmer Republic	Bangkok, Thailand
	Park Su-deok 37'; Lee Hoe-taik 60'; Cha Bum-kun 72'; Park Lee-chun 78' (pen.)		Doeur 82'

12 May 1972 AFC Asian Cup (Group B)	South Korea	1–2	Kuwait	Bangkok, Thailand
	Park Lee-chun 2' (pen.)		Al-Asfoor 24'; Duraiham 74'

17 May 1972 AFC Asian Cup (Semi-finals)	Thailand	1–1 (a.e.t.) (1–2 p)	South Korea	Bangkok, Thailand
	Niwatana 97'		Park Lee-chun 113'
	Penalties
	Chatchai (penalty missed); Prapon (penalty missed); Niwatana (penalty missed); Chirawat (penalty scored); Narong (penalty missed)		(penalty scored) Park Lee-chun; (penalty missed) Lee Cha-man; (penalty scored) Ko Jae-wook; (penalty missed) Kim Jin-kook; (penalty missed) Cha Bum-kun

19 May 1972 AFC Asian Cup (Final)	South Korea	1–2 (a.e.t.)	Iran	Bangkok, Thailand
	Park Lee-chun 65'		Jabbari 49'; Kalani 108'

15 July 1972 Merdeka Tournament	South Korea	0–0	Hong Kong	Kuala Lumpur, Malaysia

17 July 1972 Merdeka Tournament	South Korea	2–0	Thailand	Kuala Lumpur, Malaysia
	Park Lee-chun 51', 81' (pen.)

19 July 1972 Merdeka Tournament	South Korea	4–1	Singapore	Kuala Lumpur, Malaysia
	Ko Jae-wook 13'; Park Su-deok 30'; Cha Bum-kun 43'; Park Lee-chun 52'		Samad 44'

23 July 1972 Merdeka Tournament	South Korea	2–0	Indonesia	Kuala Lumpur, Malaysia
	Lee Hoe-taik 51'; Cha Bum-kun 56'

26 July 1972 Merdeka Tournament	South Korea	3–0	Japan	Kuala Lumpur, Malaysia
	Park Su-deok 27', 64'; Park Lee-chun 58'

29 July 1972 Merdeka Tournament	Malaysia	1–2	South Korea	Kuala Lumpur, Malaysia
	Chin Aun 68'		Chandra 44' (o.g.); Cha Bum-kun 49'

14 September Japan–Korea Regular Match	Japan	2–2	South Korea	Tokyo, Japan
	Kamamoto 18', 89'		Park Lee-chun 48'; Lee Cha-man 65'

20 September 1972 Korea Cup	South Korea	3–0	Thailand	Seoul, South Korea
	Park Lee-chun 14'; Park Su-deok 33'; Cha Bum-kun 70'

22 September 1972 Korea Cup	South Korea	3–1	Khmer Republic	Seoul, South Korea
	Park Lee-chun 26' (pen.); Kim Jin-kook 32', 61'		Tuy 85'

24 September 1972 Korea Cup	South Korea	2–0	Malaysia	Seoul, South Korea
	Park Lee-chun 20' (pen.), 80'

27 September 1972 Korea Cup	South Korea	0–1	Burma	Seoul, South Korea
			Ye Nyunt 23'

30 September 1972 Korea Cup	South Korea	1–0	Malaysia	Seoul, South Korea
	Park Su-deok 56'

22 October Friendly	South Korea	1–1	Australia	Seoul, South Korea
	Lee Cha-man 65'		Baartz 9'

24 October Friendly	South Korea	0–2	Australia	Seoul, South Korea
			Baartz 14'; Armstrong 41'

18 November 1972 King's Cup	South Korea	4–1	Malaysia	Bangkok, Thailand
	Kim Jin-kook 20'; Jeong Gyu-poong 53', 83'; Park Lee-chun 65' (pen.)		Affendi 64'

22 November 1972 King's Cup	South Korea	1–1	Indonesia	Bangkok, Thailand
	Cha Bum-kun 33'		Park Young-tae 34' (o.g.)

24 November 1972 King's Cup	South Korea	2–0	Singapore	Bangkok, Thailand
	Park Lee-chun 44', 65'

26 November 1972 King's Cup	Thailand	1–0	South Korea	Bangkok, Thailand
	Niwat 40'

28 November 1972 King's Cup	South Korea	0–0	Singapore	Bangkok, Thailand

=== 1973 ===
19 May 1974 FIFA World Cup (Qualification)	South Korea	4–0	Thailand	Seoul, South Korea
	Kim Jae-han 52'; Cha Bum-kun 60'; Jeong Gyu-poong 79', 84'

21 May 1974 FIFA World Cup (Qualification)	South Korea	0–0	Malaysia	Seoul, South Korea

23 May 1974 FIFA World Cup (Qualification)	South Korea	0–0	Israel	Seoul, South Korea

26 May 1974 FIFA World Cup (Qualification)	South Korea	3–1	Hong Kong	Seoul, South Korea
	Kim Jae-han 44'; Park Lee-chun 52'; Jeong Gyu-poong 72'		Yuen Kuen-chu 5'

28 May 1974 FIFA World Cup (Qualification)	South Korea	1–0 (a.e.t.)	Israel	Seoul, South Korea
	Cha Bum-kun 109'

23 June Japan–Korea Regular Match	South Korea	2–0	Japan	Seoul, South Korea
	Lee Cha-man 56'; Kim Jae-han 74'

22 September 1973 Korea Cup	South Korea	6–0	Khmer Republic	Seoul, South Korea
	Kim Jin-kook 5', 24'; Cha Bum-kun 14', 32'; Kim Jae-han 53'; Park Lee-chun 72' (pen.)			Stadium: Dongdaemun Stadium

24 September 1973 Korea Cup	South Korea	3–1	Indonesia	Seoul, South Korea
	Kim Jae-han 11', 79'; Kim Jin-kook 73'		Kadir 21'	Stadium: Dongdaemun Stadium

28 September 1973 Korea Cup	South Korea	0–1	Burma	Seoul, South Korea
			Tin Win 30'	Stadium: Dongdaemun Stadium

30 September 1973 Korea Cup	South Korea	2–0	Malaysia	Seoul, South Korea
	Cha Bum-kun 14'; Kang Tae-hyun 70'			Stadium: Dongdaemun Stadium

28 October 1974 FIFA World Cup (Qualification)	Australia	0–0	South Korea

10 November 1974 FIFA World Cup (Qualification)	South Korea	2–2	Australia	Seoul, South Korea
	Kim Jae-han 15'; Ko Jae-wook 27'		Buljevic 29'; Baartz 48'

13 November 1974 FIFA World Cup (Qualification)	South Korea	0–1	Australia	Hong Kong
			Mackay 70'

16 December 1973 King's Cup	South Korea	5–0	Khmer Republic	Bangkok, Thailand
	Jeong Gyu-poong 16', 75'; Park Lee-chun 23'; Kim Jae-han 40'; Cha Bum-kun 58'

18 December 1973 King's Cup	South Korea	0–0	Malaysia	Bangkok, Thailand

22 December 1973 King's Cup	South Korea	2–0	Burma	Bangkok, Thailand
	Park Lee-chun 58'; Cha Bum-kun 89'

25 December 1973 King's Cup	South Korea	2–1	Malaysia	Bangkok, Thailand
	Yoo Geon-soo 3'; Cha Bum-kun 12'	Report	Mokhtar 75'

=== 1974 ===
13 May 1974 Korea Cup	South Korea	0–1	Khmer Republic	Seoul, South Korea
			Doeur 9'	Stadium: Dongdaemun Stadium

18 May 1974 Korea Cup	South Korea	3–0	Burma	Seoul, South Korea
	Park Lee-chun 50'; Cha Bum-kun 71'; Kim Jae-han 74'			Stadium: Dongdaemun Stadium

4 September 1974 Asian Games (Preliminary Group A)	South Korea	1–0	Thailand	Tehran, Iran
	Ko Jae-wook 41'

6 September 1974 Asian Games (Preliminary Group A)	South Korea	0–4	Kuwait	Tehran, Iran
			Kamel 5', 24'; Yaqoub 30', 89'

9 September 1974 Asian Games (Group A)	South Korea	1–1	Iraq	Tehran, Iran
	Park Byung-chul 49'		Jassam 73'

12 September 1974 Asian Games (Group A)	Iran	2–0	South Korea	Tehran, Iran
	Mazloumi 75', 89'

14 September 1974 Asian Games (Group A)	South Korea	2–3	Malaysia	Tehran, Iran
	Lee Hoe-taik 12'; Park Lee-chun 81'		Harun 10', 22'; Isa 79'

28 September Japan–Korea Regular Match	Japan	4–1	South Korea	Tokyo, Japan
	Kamamoto 35', 53'; Yoshimura 39'; Arai 89'		Kim Jae-han 65'

11 December 1974 King's Cup	South Korea	4–0	Indonesia	Bangkok, Thailand
	Kim Jin-kook 7', 14'; Ko Jae-wook 11'; Park Lee-chun 83'

13 December 1974 King's Cup	South Korea	2–1	Khmer Republic	Bangkok, Thailand
	Park Byung-chul 75'; Kang Gi-wook 87'		Sea 72'

15 December 1974 King's Cup	South Korea	2–2	South Vietnam	Bangkok, Thailand
	Lee Cha-man 83'; Choi Jae-mo 85' (pen.)		La Van Tam 16'; Vo Thanh Son 79'

18 December 1974 King's Cup	South Korea	0–0 (a.e.t.) (5–3 p)	Malaysia	Bangkok, Thailand
	Penalties
	Choi Jae-mo (penalty scored); Kang Gi-wook (penalty scored); Park Byung-chul (penalty scored); Hwang Jae-man (penalty scored); Park Lee-chun (penalty scored)		(penalty scored) Mohd; (penalty scored) Mokhtar; (penalty scored) Harun; (penalty missed) ?; (penalty missed) ?

20 December 1974 King's Cup	Thailand	1–3 (a.e.t.)	South Korea	Bangkok, Thailand
	Niwat 19'		Park Lee-chun 22'; Kim Jin-kook 97'; Huh Jung-moo 110'

25 December Hong Kong Tournament	South Korea	3–1	Indonesia	Hong Kong
	Kim Jin-kook 4', 73'; Cha Bum-kun 55'		? 75'

=== 1975 ===
16 March 1976 AFC Asian Cup (Qualification)	South Korea	1–2	Malaysia	Bangkok, Thailand
	Cho Dong-hyun 33'		Isa 19'; ? 49' (pen.)

19 March 1976 AFC Asian Cup (Qualification)	South Korea	1–0	South Vietnam	Bangkok, Thailand
	Hwang Jae-man 79'

22 March 1976 AFC Asian Cup (Qualification)	South Korea	1–0	Indonesia	Bangkok, Thailand
	Ko Jae-wook 54'

24 March 1976 AFC Asian Cup (Qualification)	Thailand	1–0	South Korea	Bangkok, Thailand
	Sithiporn 10' (pen.)

16 May 1975 Korea Cup	South Korea	1–0	Lebanon	Seoul, South Korea
	Park Byung-chul 36'

22 May 1975 Korea Cup	South Korea	1–0	Burma	Seoul, South Korea
	Huh Jung-moo 8'

12 June 1975 Jakarta Anniversary Tournament	South Korea	2–0	Burma	Jakarta, Indonesia
	Cho Dong-hyun 15', 86'

16 June 1975 Jakarta Anniversary Tournament	South Korea	1–1 (a.e.t.) (3–4 p)	Malaysia	Jakarta, Indonesia
	Lee Young-moo 35'		Mokhtar 10'
	Penalties
	Lee Young-moo (penalty scored); Yoo Dong-chun (penalty scored); Choi Jong-duk (penalty scored); Park Gyeong-bok (penalty missed); Park Byung-chul (penalty missed); Cho Young-jeung (penalty missed)

18 June 1975 Jakarta Anniversary Tournament	Indonesia	3–2	South Korea	Jakarta, Indonesia
			Park Byung-chul 20'; Cho Dong-hyun 42'

29 July 1975 Merdeka Tournament	Malaysia	1–3	South Korea	Kuala Lumpur, Malaysia
	Mokhtar 90'		Kim Jin-kook 2'; Cha Bum-kun 38'; Park Sung-hwa 84'

1 August 1975 Merdeka Tournament	South Korea	1–0	Hong Kong	Kuala Lumpur, Malaysia
	Kim Jin-kook 70'

3 August 1975 Merdeka Tournament	South Korea	3–2	Burma	Kuala Lumpur, Malaysia
	Cho Dong-hyun 8'; Kim Jae-han 10'; Kim Ho-kon 49' (pen.)		Than Soe 22'; Maung Tin Khin 44'

7 August 1975 Merdeka Tournament	South Korea	6–0	Thailand	Kuala Lumpur, Malaysia
	Kim Jin-kook 14', 20', 43'; Cha Bum-kun 41'; Park Byung-chul 74'; Lee Young-moo 83'

9 August 1975 Merdeka Tournament	South Korea	3–1	Japan	Kuala Lumpur, Malaysia
	Cha Bum-kun 4', 42', 47'		Ochiai 17'

11 August 1975 Merdeka Tournament	South Korea	5–1	Indonesia	Kuala Lumpur, Malaysia
	Cha Bum-kun 22'; Cho Dong-hyun 39', 59'; Yoo Dong-chun 82'; Park Sung-hwa 84'		Abdillah 89' (pen.)

15 August 1975 Merdeka Tournament	South Korea	4–0	Bangladesh	Kuala Lumpur, Malaysia
	Kim Jin-kook 41'; Park Sung-hwa 57', 60'; Cha Bum-kun 87'

17 August 1975 Merdeka Tournament	Malaysia	0–1	South Korea	Kuala Lumpur, Malaysia
			Lee Young-moo 31'

8 September Japan–Korea Regular Match	South Korea	3–0	Japan	Seoul, South Korea
	Cho Dong-hyun 3'; Park Sang-in 20'; Lee Young-moo 30'

14 December 1976 Summer Olympics (Qualification)	Republic of China	0–2	South Korea	Kaohsiung, Republic of China
			Park Sang-in 35'; Lee Young-moo 62'

21 December 1975 King's Cup	South Korea	3–1	Burma	Bangkok, Thailand
	Cha Bum-kun 13', 17'; Kim Jin-kook 67'		Than Soe 24'

23 December 1975 King's Cup	Thailand	2–1	South Korea	Bangkok, Thailand
	Cherdsak 18'; Sawadi 31'		? 78'

27 December 1975 King's Cup	South Korea	2–0	Indonesia	Bangkok, Thailand
	Park Byung-chul 63'; Lee Young-moo 66'

30 December 1975 King's Cup	South Korea	5–0	Singapore	Bangkok, Thailand
	Cho Dong-hyun 4'; Lee Young-moo 20', 83', 89'; Kim Jin-kook 29'

=== 1976 ===
4 January 1975 King's Cup	South Korea	1–0	Burma	Bangkok, Thailand
	Cho Dong-hyun 19'

6 March 1976 Summer Olympics (Qualification)	South Korea	3–0	Republic of China	Seoul, South Korea
	Cha Bum-kun 16'; Kim Jin-kook 44'; Park Byung-chul 80'

21 March 1976 Summer Olympics (Qualification)	Japan	0–2	South Korea	Tokyo, Japan
			Lee Young-moo 2'; Park Sang-in 71'

27 March 1976 Summer Olympics (Qualification)	South Korea	2–2	Japan	Seoul, South Korea
	Kim Jin-kook 3'; Cha Bum-kun 77'		Kamamoto 40', 88'

4 April 1976 Summer Olympics (Qualification)	South Korea	1–3	Israel	Seoul, South Korea
	Kim Ho-kon 64' (pen.)		Schweitzer 19'; Damti 51', 72'

28 April 1976 Summer Olympics (Qualification)	Israel	0–0	South Korea	Tel Aviv, Israel

7 August 1976 Merdeka Tournament	Malaysia	2–1	South Korea	Kuala Lumpur, Malaysia
	Mokhtar ?'; Isa ?'		Choi Jong-duk 62'

10 August 1976 Merdeka Tournament	South Korea	8–0	India	Kuala Lumpur, Malaysia
	Cha Bum-kun 12', 45', 80'; Park Sang-in 15', 34'; Kim Jin-kook 18'; Kim Kang-nam 67'; Kim Ho-kon 76'

12 August 1976 Merdeka Tournament	South Korea	2–0	Indonesia	Kuala Lumpur, Malaysia
	Park Sang-in 36'; Choi Jong-duk 87'

15 August 1976 Merdeka Tournament	South Korea	2–2	Burma	Kuala Lumpur, Malaysia
	Park Yong-ju 43'; Cha Bum-kun 65'		Mya Kyiang 3'; Tin Win 58'

18 August 1976 Merdeka Tournament	South Korea	0–0	Japan	Kuala Lumpur, Malaysia

20 August 1976 Merdeka Tournament	South Korea	2–1	Thailand	Kuala Lumpur, Malaysia
	Kim Jin-kook 35'; Kang Byung-chan 54'		Witthaya 86'

11 September 1976 Korea Cup	South Korea	4–4	Malaysia	Seoul, South Korea
	Park Sang-in 69'; Cha Bum-kun 83', 87', 89'		Wan 12'; Isa 21'; Kim Chul-soo 32' (o.g.); Mokhtar 79'

13 September 1976 Korea Cup	South Korea	4–0	India	Seoul, South Korea
	Lee Young-moo 40', 53'; Cho Dong-hyun 42'; Cha Bum-kun 58'

17 September 1976 Korea Cup	South Korea	7–0	Singapore	Seoul, South Korea
	Cha Bum-kun 3', 85'; Kim Kang-nam 27'; Lee Young-moo 29'; Kim Jin-kook 36', 37'; Park Sang-in 76'

23 September 1976 Korea Cup	South Korea	2–0	New Zealand	Seoul, South Korea
	Kim Jin-kook 21'; Park Sang-in 39'

4 December Japan–Korea Regular Match	Japan	1–2	South Korea	Tokyo, Japan
	Nagai 33'		Huh Jung-moo 72'; Hwang Jae-man 76'

15 December 1976 King's Cup	Thailand	2–1	South Korea	Bangkok, Thailand
	Cherdsak 27'; Witthaya 71'		Choi Jong-duk 31'

17 December 1976 King's Cup	South Korea	4–0	Singapore	Bangkok, Thailand
	Choi Jong-duk 37'; Park Sung-hwa 46', 67', 73'

22 December 1976 King's Cup	South Korea	1–1 (a.e.t.) (2–3 p)	Malaysia	Bangkok, Thailand
	Cha Bum-kun 30'		Chee Keong 19'
	Penalties
	Kim Ho-kon (penalty missed); Kim Sung-nam (penalty scored); Choi Jong-duk (penalty missed); Cha Bum-kun (penalty scored); Kang Byung-chan (penalty missed)

=== 1977 ===
14 February Friendly	Singapore	0–4	South Korea	Singapore
			Cha Bum-kun 17'; Lee Young-moo 31'; Huh Jung-moo 75'; Kim Kang-nam 85'

18 February Friendly	Bahrain	1–4	South Korea	Manama, Bahrain
	Fahad 80'		Huh Jung-moo 2', 83'; Cha Bum-kun 8'; Cho Young-jeung 34'

20 February Friendly	Bahrain	1–1	South Korea	Manama, Bahrain
	Barham 74'		Huh Jung-moo 61'

27 February 1978 FIFA World Cup (Qualification)	Israel	0–0	South Korea	Tel Aviv, Israel

20 March 1978 FIFA World Cup (Qualification)	South Korea	3–1	Israel	Seoul, South Korea
	Cha Bum-kun 22'; Park Sang-in 87'; Choi Jong-duk 89'		Malmilian 76'

26 March Japan–Korea Regular Match	Japan	0–0	South Korea	Tokyo, Japan

3 April 1978 FIFA World Cup (Qualification)	South Korea	1–0	Japan	Seoul, South Korea
	Cha Bum-kun 83' (pen.)

15 June Japan–Korea Regular Match	South Korea	2–1	Japan	Seoul, South Korea
	Kim Jin-kook 21'; Kim Sung-nam 25'		Kaneda 55'

26 June 1978 FIFA World Cup (Qualification)	Hong Kong	0–1	South Korea	Hong Kong
			Cha Bum-kun 80'

3 July 1978 FIFA World Cup (Qualification)	South Korea	0–0	Iran	Busan, South Korea

17 July 1977 Merdeka Tournament	South Korea	4–0	Libya	Kuala Lumpur, Malaysia
	Huh Jung-moo 20', 61', 89'; Cha Bum-kun 50'

20 July 1977 Merdeka Tournament	South Korea	4–1	Thailand	Kuala Lumpur, Malaysia
	Kim Jae-han 55', 57', 66', 88'		Sawadi 14'

22 July 1977 Merdeka Tournament	South Korea	5–1	Indonesia	Kuala Lumpur, Malaysia
	Shin Hyun-ho 9'; Cho Kwang-rae 14'; Cha Bum-kun 50'; Kim Jae-han 61', 85'		Ismanto 35'

24 July 1977 Merdeka Tournament	South Korea	4–0	Burma	Kuala Lumpur, Malaysia
	Park Sang-in 5'; Cha Bum-kun 9'; Cho Kwang-rae 24'; Kim Jae-han 43'

26 July 1977 Merdeka Tournament	Malaysia	1–1	South Korea	Kuala Lumpur, Malaysia
	Mokhtar 70' (pen.)		Huh Jung-moo 5'

28 July 1977 Merdeka Tournament	South Korea	1–1	Iraq	Kuala Lumpur, Malaysia
	Kim Jae-han 30'		Saeed 66'

31 July 1977 Merdeka Tournament	South Korea	1–0	Iraq	Kuala Lumpur, Malaysia
	Cha Bum-kun 60'

27 August 1978 FIFA World Cup (Qualification)	Australia	2–1	South Korea	Sydney, Australia
	Kosmina 63', 70'		Cha Bum-kun 24'

3 September 1977 Korea Cup	South Korea	5–1	Thailand	Seoul, South Korea
	Kim Jae-han 23', 37'; Cha Bum-kun 50'; Huh Jung-moo 58', 68'		Sithipon 81'

5 September 1977 Korea Cup	South Korea	3–0	India	Daegu, South Korea
	Cha Bum-kun 56', 89'; Kim Jae-han 84'

13 September 1977 Korea Cup	South Korea	3–0	Malaysia	Seoul, South Korea
	Choi Jong-duk 19'; Cha Bum-kun 47'; Kim Sung-nam 49'

9 October 1978 FIFA World Cup (Qualification)	South Korea	1–0	Kuwait	Seoul, South Korea
	Park Sang-in 50'

23 October 1978 FIFA World Cup (Qualification)	South Korea	0–0	Australia	Busan, South Korea

5 November 1978 FIFA World Cup (Qualification)	Kuwait	2–2	South Korea	Kuwait City, Kuwait
	Al-Dakhil 48'; Al-Anberi 78'		Cha Bum-kun 20'; Choi Jong-duk 83'

11 November 1978 FIFA World Cup (Qualification)	Iran	2–2	South Korea	Tehran, Iran
	Rowshan 53', 68'		Lee Young-moo 28', 89'

4 December 1978 FIFA World Cup (Qualification)	South Korea	5–2	Hong Kong	Busan, South Korea
	Kim Ho-kon 23'; Huh Jung-moo 44'; Kim Jae-han 76', 80'; Park Sang-in 89'		Kwok Ka-ming 49'; Chan Fat-chi 77'

=== 1978 ===
12 July 1978 Merdeka Tournament	Malaysia	1–3	South Korea	Kuala Lumpur, Malaysia
	Abdah 46'		Kim Jae-han 27', 57'; Lee Young-moo 69'

14 July 1978 Merdeka Tournament	South Korea	3–0	Thailand	Kuala Lumpur, Malaysia
	Kim Jae-han 19', 73'; Lee Young-moo 78'

16 July 1978 Merdeka Tournament	South Korea	2–0	Singapore	Kuala Lumpur, Malaysia
	Shin Hyun-ho 12'; Kim Jae-han 82'

19 July 1978 Merdeka Tournament	South Korea	4–0	Japan	Kuala Lumpur, Malaysia
	Cho Kwang-rae 20'; Cha Bum-kun 44'; Park Sung-hwa 75'; Kim Ho-kon 88'

22 July 1978 Merdeka Tournament	South Korea	2–0	Iraq	Kuala Lumpur, Malaysia
	Choi Jong-duk 28'; Cha Bum-kun 70'

25 July 1978 Merdeka Tournament	South Korea	2–0	Indonesia	Kuala Lumpur, Malaysia
	Cha Bum-kun 70'; Kim Kang-nam 85'

27 July 1978 Merdeka Tournament	South Korea	2–0	Syria	Kuala Lumpur, Malaysia
	Park Sung-hwa 65', 84'

29 July 1978 Merdeka Tournament	South Korea	2–0	Iraq	Kuala Lumpur, Malaysia
	Lee Young-moo 16'; Kim Jae-han 20'

11 September 1978 Korea Cup	South Korea	2–2	Malaysia	Daegu, South Korea
	Kim Jae-han 67', 77'	Report 1 Report 2	Bakri 19'; Hamidon (Note: Korea Football Association documented Reduan Abdullah as Malaysian second goalscorer unlike newspapers of the time.) 47'

13 September 1978 Korea Cup	South Korea	3–1	Bahrain	Daegu, South Korea
	Huh Jung-moo 23'; Lee Young-moo 28'; Kim Sung-nam 64'		I. Farhan 16'

11 December 1978 Asian Games (Preliminary Group C)	South Korea	5–1	Bahrain	Bangkok, Thailand
	Cho Kwang-rae 52', 57'; Cha Bum-kun 67'; Oh Seok-jae 87', 88'		Shwayer 75'

13 December 1978 Asian Games (Preliminary Group C)	South Korea	2–0	Kuwait	Bangkok, Thailand
	Oh Seok-jae 57'; Huh Jung-moo 59'

15 December 1978 Asian Games (Preliminary Group C)	South Korea	3–1	Japan	Bangkok, Thailand
	Lee Young-moo 8'; Park Sung-hwa 28'; Oh Seok-jae 68'		Kato 87'

17 December 1978 Asian Games (Group B)	South Korea	1–0	China	Bangkok, Thailand
	Cha Bum-kun 47'

18 December 1978 Asian Games (Group B)	South Korea	1–0	Malaysia	Bangkok, Thailand
	Oh Seok-jae 18'

19 December 1978 Asian Games (Group B)	Thailand	1–3	South Korea	Bangkok, Thailand
	Jirasak 83'		Jirasak 27' (o.g.); Oh Seok-jae 33'; Kim Sung-nam 82'

20 December 1978 Asian Games (Final)	South Korea	0–0 (a.e.t.)	North Korea	Bangkok, Thailand

25 December 1980 AFC Asian Cup (Qualification)	South Korea	4–1	Macau	Manila, Philippines
	Huh Jung-moo 34'; Lee Young-moo 35', 44', 82'		Kon Chi-fat 83'

27 December 1980 AFC Asian Cup (Qualification)	Philippines	0–5	South Korea	Manila, Philippines
			Park Sang-in 30'; Kim Jae-han 43'; Park Sung-hwa 52'; Shin Hyun-ho 65'; Lee Kang-jo 78'

29 December 1980 AFC Asian Cup (Qualification)	South Korea	1–0	China	Manila, Philippines
	Huh Jung-moo 13'

=== 1979 ===
4 March Japan–Korea Regular Match	Japan	2–1	South Korea	Tokyo, Japan
	Usui 21'; Nakamura 25'		Oh Seok-jae 87'

16 June Japan–Korea Regular Match	South Korea	4–1	Japan	Seoul, South Korea
	Park Sung-hwa 15', 25', 54'; Shin Hyun-ho 73'		Nagai 47'

8 September 1979 Korea Cup	South Korea	8–0	Sudan	Seoul, South Korea
	Park Sung-hwa 2', 32'; Shin Hyun-ho 3', 88'; Mukhtar 12' (o.g.); Huh Jung-moo 22'; Cho Kwang-rae 34'; Yoo Geon-su 73'			Stadium: Dongdaemun Stadium

12 September 1979 Korea Cup	South Korea	6–0	Sri Lanka	Daegu, South Korea
	Huh Jung-moo 28'; Shin Hyun-ho 37', 40'; Lee Jung-il 62'; Yoo Geon-su 71'; Lee Young-moo 86'			Stadium: Daegu Civic Stadium

14 September 1979 Korea Cup	South Korea	5–1	Bahrain	Jeonju, South Korea
	Park Sung-hwa 1'; Lee Young-moo 8', 77'; Lee Jang-soo 83'; Lee Jung-il 88'		Jawed 57'	Stadium: Cheongju Sports Complex

16 September 1979 Korea Cup	South Korea	9–0	Bangladesh	Incheon, South Korea
	Huh Jung-moo 50', 66', 83'; Park Sung-hwa 52', 55'; Cho Kwang-rae 60', 78', 89'; Park Chang-sun 88'			Stadium: Incheon Sungui Stadium

== See also ==
- South Korea national football team results
- South Korea national football team
