= 1977 President Park's Cup Football Tournament =

1977 President Park's Cup
Tournament details
- Host country: South Korea
- Dates: 3–15 September
- Teams: 9

Final positions
- Champions: (Brazil) Paulista U21 (2nd title)
- Runners-up: South Korea
- Third place: Malaysia; Thailand

Tournament statistics
- Matches played: 18
- Goals scored: 72 (4 per match)
- Top scorer: (South Korea) Cha Bum-kun (6 goals)

The 1977 President Park's Cup Football Tournament (Korean: 제7회 박대통령컵 쟁탈 국제축구대회) was the seventh competition of Korea Cup. It was held from 3 to 15 September 1977, and was won by Paulista under-21 (São Paulo state) for the second time, who defeated South Korea in the final.

== Group stage ==
=== Group A ===
| Team | Pld | W | D | L | GF | GA | GD | Pts | Qualification |
|---|---|---|---|---|---|---|---|---|---|
| South Korea | 4 | 4 | 0 | 0 | 16 | 3 | +13 | 8 | Qualification to semi-finals |
| Thailand | 4 | 3 | 0 | 1 | 12 | 7 | +5 | 6 | Qualification to semi-finals |
| (Lebanon) Racing Beirut | 4 | 1 | 0 | 3 | 8 | 14 | −6 | 2 | |
| (England) Middlesex Wanderers | 4 | 1 | 0 | 3 | 4 | 10 | −6 | 2 | |
| India | 4 | 1 | 0 | 3 | 4 | 10 | −6 | 2 | |

3 September 1977

| South Korea | 5–1 | Thailand |
|---|---|---|
| Kim Jae-han 23', 37'; Cha Bum-kun 50'; Huh Jung-moo 58', 68' | Report; Newscast | Sithipon 81' |

Dongdaemun Stadium, Seoul

3 September 1977

| Racing Beirut (Lebanon) | 2–1 | (England) Middlesex Wanderers |
|---|---|---|
| Antonio 58'; Raffoul 89' | Report | Harris 62' (pen.) |

Dongdaemun Stadium, Seoul

5 September 1977

| South Korea | 3–0 | India |
|---|---|---|
| Cha Bum-kun 56', 89'; Kim Jae-han 84' | Report |

Daegu Civic Stadium, Daegu

5 September 1977

| Thailand | 2–1 | (England) Middlesex Wanderers |
|---|---|---|
| Daoyod 18'; ? (?) | Report | Abbey 9' |

Daegu Civic Stadium, Daegu

7 September 1977

| South Korea | 4–1 | (Lebanon) Racing Beirut |
|---|---|---|
| Cho Kwang-rae 33'; Cha Bum-kun 43'; Kim Jae-han 84', 85' | Report | ? 47' |

Busan Gudeok Stadium, Busan

7 September 1977

| Thailand | 4–0 | India |
|---|---|---|
| Chersak 12', 42', 72'; Pichai (?) | Report 1 Report 2 |

Busan Gudeok Stadium, Busan

9 September 1977

| Thailand | 5–3 | (Lebanon) Racing Beirut |
|---|---|---|
| Sompon 14'; Daoyod 20', 38'; Niwat 25'; Weerayudth 31' | Report | Anthony 44', 86'; Raffoul 51' |

Dongdaemun Stadium, Seoul

9 September 1977

| Middlesex Wanderers (England) | 1–0 | India |
|---|---|---|
| Brooks 82' | Report |

Dongdaemun Stadium, Seoul

11 September 1977

| South Korea | 6–1 | (England) Middlesex Wanderers |
|---|---|---|
| Kim Jin-kook 41', 83'; Shin Hyun-ho 51', 77', 86'; Cha Bum-Kun 54' | Report | Webb 60' |

Dongdaemun Stadium, Seoul

11 September 1977

| India | 4–2 | (Lebanon) Racing Beirut |
|---|---|---|
| Doraiswamy 15'; Kumar 50'; Ulaganathan 53'; H. Singh 80' | Report 1 Report 2 | Raffoul 33'; Antonio 81' |

Dongdaemun Stadium, Seoul

=== Group B ===
| Team | Pld | W | D | L | GF | GA | GD | Pts | Qualification |
|---|---|---|---|---|---|---|---|---|---|
| (Brazil) Paulista U21 | 3 | 2 | 1 | 0 | 8 | 2 | +6 | 5 | Qualification to semi-finals |
| Malaysia | 3 | 1 | 1 | 1 | 5 | 5 | 0 | 3 | Qualification to semi-finals |
| South Korea B | 3 | 0 | 3 | 0 | 3 | 3 | 0 | 3 | |
| Bahrain | 3 | 0 | 1 | 2 | 2 | 8 | −6 | 1 | |

4 September 1977

| Paulista U21 (Brazil) | 4–0 | Bahrain |
|---|---|---|
| Borges 15'; Baroninho 29'; ? 42'; Souza 79' | Report |

Dongdaemun Stadium, Seoul

4 September 1977

| South Korea B | 1–1 | Malaysia |
|---|---|---|
| Shin Dong-min 28' | Report | Isa 13' |

Dongdaemun Stadium, Seoul

6 September 1977

| Paulista U21 (Brazil) | 3–1 | Malaysia |
|---|---|---|
| Borges 16', 57'; Souza 50' | Report | Yip 24' |

Busan Gudeok Stadium, Busan

6 September 1977

| South Korea B | 1–1 | Bahrain |
|---|---|---|
| Park Min-jae 30' | Report | Farhan 75' |

Busan Gudeok Stadium, Busan

8 September 1977

| Malaysia | 3–1 | Bahrain |
|---|---|---|
| Santokh 4'; Yip 17'; Hassan Sani 90' | Report | Ali Hassan 63' |

Daegu Civic Stadium, Daegu

8 September 1977

| South Korea B | 1–1 | (Brazil) Paulista U21 |
|---|---|---|
| Kim Chang-ho 75' | Report | Araújo 85' |

Daegu Civic Stadium, Daegu

== Knockout stage ==
=== Bracket ===
Semi-finals
13 September – Seoul
South Korea | 3
Malaysia | 0
13 September – Seoul
(Brazil) Paulista U21 | 4
Thailand | 0

Final
15 September – Seoul
South Korea | 0
(Brazil) Paulista U21 | 1
Third place play-off
15 September – Seoul
Malaysia | 1
Thailand | 1

=== Semi-finals ===
13 September 1977

| South Korea | 3–0 | Malaysia |
|---|---|---|
| Choi Jong-duk 19'; Cha Bum-kun 47'; Kim Sung-nam 49' | Report |

Dongdaemun Stadium, Seoul

13 September 1977

| Paulista U21 (Brazil) | 4–0 | Thailand |
|---|---|---|
| Baroninho 25'; Souza 26', 54'; Gatãozinho 44' | Report |

Dongdaemun Stadium, Seoul

=== Third place play-off ===
15 September 1977

| Malaysia | 1–1 | Thailand |
|---|---|---|
| Bakri 48' | Report | Sompon 31' |

Dongdaemun Stadium, Seoul

=== Final ===
15 September 1977

| South Korea | 0–1 | (Brazil) Paulista U21 |
|---|---|---|
| | Report | Baroninho 13' |

Dongdaemun Stadium, Seoul

== See also ==
- Korea Cup
- South Korea national football team results
