= 1975 President's Cup Football Tournament =

1975 President's Cup
Tournament details
- Host country: South Korea
- City: Seoul
- Dates: 10–22 May
- Teams: 8

Final positions
- Champions: South Korea (3rd title)
- Runners-up: Burma
- Third place: (Iran) Homa
- Fourth place: Japan B

Tournament statistics
- Matches played: 20
- Goals scored: 48 (2.4 per match)

The 1975 President's Cup Football Tournament (Korean: 제5회 박대통령컵 쟁탈 아시아축구대회) was the fifth competition of Korea Cup. The competition was held from 10 to 22 May 1975, and was won by South Korea for the third time, who defeated Burma in the final.

== Group allocation matches ==
10 May 1975

| South Korea | 0–1 | (Iran) Homa |
|---|---|---|
| | Report | Nazmi 37' |

Dongdaemun Stadium, Seoul

10 May 1975

| Burma | 0–0 | Japan B |
Penalties
| | 1–4 |

Dongdaemun Stadium, Seoul

11 May 1975

| Thailand | 5–0 | Indonesia B |
|---|---|---|
| Jesdapon 47', ?', ?' | Report |

Dongdaemun Stadium, Seoul

11 May 1975

| Perak (Malaysia) | 1–3 | Lebanon |
|---|---|---|
| P. Umaparam 62' | Report | Shatila 40'; Hatoum 49' (pen.); Al Ghoul 70' |

Dongdaemun Stadium, Seoul

== Group stage ==
=== Group A ===
| Team | Pld | W | D | L | GF | GA | GD | Pts | Qualification |
|---|---|---|---|---|---|---|---|---|---|
| Burma | 3 | 2 | 1 | 0 | 7 | 2 | +5 | 5 | Qualification to semi-finals |
| (Iran) Homa | 3 | 1 | 2 | 0 | 5 | 2 | +3 | 4 | Qualification to semi-finals |
| Thailand | 3 | 0 | 2 | 1 | 5 | 8 | −3 | 2 | |
| (Malaysia) Perak | 3 | 0 | 1 | 2 | 3 | 8 | −5 | 1 | |

13 May 1975
18:00 UTC+9

| Thailand | 3–3 | (Malaysia) Perak |
|---|---|---|
| Sithipon 1', 67' (pen.); Weerayudth 80' | Report | Syed 2', 66'; Salleh 61' (pen.) |

Dongdaemun Stadium, Seoul

13 May 1975
19:40 UTC+9

| Homa (Iran) | 1–1 | Burma |
|---|---|---|
| Ahmad 36' | Report | Mya Kyiang 7' |

Dongdaemun Stadium, Seoul

15 May 1975
18:00 UTC+9

| Burma | 4–1 | Thailand |
|---|---|---|
| Mya Kyiang 28'; ? ?'; ? ?'; ? ?' | Report | Juta 90' |

Dongdaemun Stadium, Seoul

15 May 1975
19:40 UTC+9

| Homa (Iran) | 3–0 | (Malaysia) Perak |
|---|---|---|
| Nouraei 20', 80'; Habibullah 25' | Report |

Dongdaemun Stadium, Seoul

17 May 1975
15:00 UTC+9

| Burma | 2–0 | (Malaysia) Perak |
|---|---|---|
| Khin Maung Tin 25', 55' | Report |

Dongdaemun Stadium, Seoul

17 May 1975
16:40 UTC+9

| Homa (Iran) | 1–1 | Thailand |
|---|---|---|
| Mohammad 53' | Report | ? 7' |

Dongdaemun Stadium, Seoul

=== Group B ===
| Team | Pld | W | D | L | GF | GA | GD | Pts | Qualification |
|---|---|---|---|---|---|---|---|---|---|
| South Korea | 3 | 3 | 0 | 0 | 5 | 0 | +5 | 6 | Qualification to semi-finals |
| Japan B | 3 | 1 | 1 | 1 | 2 | 2 | 0 | 3 | Qualification to semi-finals |
| Lebanon | 3 | 1 | 0 | 2 | 4 | 2 | +2 | 2 | |
| Indonesia B | 3 | 0 | 1 | 2 | 1 | 8 | −7 | 1 | |

14 May 1975
18:00 UTC+9

| Indonesia B | 0–4 | Lebanon |
|---|---|---|
| | Report | Hatoum 17'; Kalfayan 33'; Sahili 59'; Al Ghoul 63' |

Dongdaemun Stadium, Seoul

14 May 1975
19:40 UTC+9

| South Korea | 1–0 | Japan B |
|---|---|---|
| Lee Cha-man 5' | Report |

Dongdaemun Stadium, Seoul

16 May 1975
18:00 UTC+9

| Japan B | 1–1 | Indonesia B |
|---|---|---|
| Nishino 38' | Report | Santoso 29' |

Dongdaemun Stadium, Seoul

16 May 1975
19:40 UTC+9

| South Korea | 1–0 | Lebanon |
|---|---|---|
| Park Byung-chul 36' | Report |

Dongdaemun Stadium, Seoul

18 May 1975
15:00 UTC+9

| Japan B | 1–0 | Lebanon |
|---|---|---|
| Nakayama 39' | Report |

Dongdaemun Stadium, Seoul

18 May 1975
16:40 UTC+9

| South Korea | 3–0 | Indonesia B |
|---|---|---|
| Cho Kwang-rae 6'; Shin Hyun-ho 10'; Park Byung-chul 17' | Report |

Dongdaemun Stadium, Seoul

== Knockout stage ==
=== Bracket ===
Semi-finals
20 May – Seoul
Burma | 1
Japan B | 0
20 May – Seoul
South Korea | 1
(Iran) Homa | 0

Final
22 May – Seoul
Burma | 0
South Korea | 1
Third place play-off
22 May – Seoul
(Iran) Homa | 3
Japan B | 0

=== Semi-finals ===
20 May 1975

| Burma | 1–0 | Japan B |
|---|---|---|
| Aye Maung 81' | Report |

Dongdaemun Stadium, Seoul

20 May 1975

| South Korea | 1–0 | (Iran) Homa |
|---|---|---|
| Huh Jung-moo 18' | Report |

Dongdaemun Stadium, Seoul

=== Third place play-off ===
22 May 1975

| Homa (Iran) | 3–0 | Japan B |

Dongdaemun Stadium, Seoul

=== Final ===
22 May 1975

| South Korea | 1–0 | Burma |
|---|---|---|
| Huh Jung-moo 8' | Report |

Dongdaemun Stadium, Seoul

== See also ==
- Korea Cup
- South Korea national football team results
