= Lee Hoe-taik =

South Korean footballer and manager

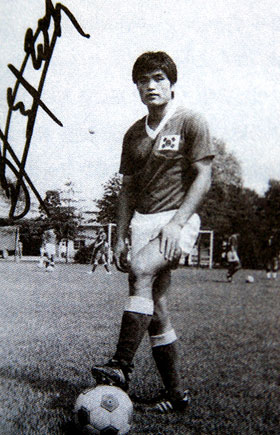
- Lee in 1972

Personal information
- Full name: Lee Hoe-taik
- Date of birth: 11 October 1946 (age 80)
- Place of birth: Gimpo, Gyeonggi, Korea
- Height: 1.67 m (5 ft 6 in)
- Position: Forward

Youth career
- 1963: Yongdungpo Technical High School
- 1963–1965: Dongbuk High School

College career
| Years | Team | Apps | (Gls) |
| 1966 | Sungkyunkwan University | | |
| 1970–1973 | Hanyang University | | |

Senior career*
| Years | Team | Apps | (Gls) |
| 1966 | Korea Coal Corporation | | |
| 1967–1969 | Yangzee | | |
| 1973–1977 | POSCO FC | | |
| 1977 | Sea Bee | | |
| 1977–1978 | POSCO FC | | |

International career
| 1965–1966 | South Korea U20 | | |
| 1966–1977 | South Korea | 82 | (21) |

Managerial career
- 1983–1985: Hanyang University
- 1987–1992: POSCO Atoms
- 1988–1990: South Korea
- 1998–2003: Jeonnam Dragons
Medal record
Men's football
Representing South Korea (as player)
Asian Games
| Gold medal – first place | 1970 Bangkok |
AFC Asian Cup
| Runner-up | 1972 Thailand |
Representing South Korea (as manager)
AFC Asian Cup
| Runner-up | 1988 Qatar |
- * Club domestic league appearances and goals

Lee Hoe-taik (Korean: 이회택, born 11 October 1946) is a former South Korean football player and manager. He is one of four players inducted into the Korean FA Hall of Fame.

== Early life ==
Lee started his youth career late in high school, but showed a fast development. He was selected for the South Korea national team three years after beginning football in earnest. On 10 December 1966, Lee made his senior international debut against Thailand at the 1966 Asian Games.

== Club career ==
Lee joined Yangzee, founded by the Korean Central Intelligence Agency to develop the national team.

At the 1967 Merdeka Tournament, Lee scored three goals, contributing to the club's title.

Yangzee also participated at the 1969 Asian Champion Club Tournament. Lee scored a hat-trick in the first group match against Mysore State. Lee was injured during the third group match against Bangkok Bank, but provided an assist for the winning goal in the next match against Vietnam Police. Yangzee won all five matches until the semi-finals, but they lost 1–0 to Maccabi Tel Aviv after extra time in the final.

== International career ==
Lee scored three goals in five matches of the 1968 Summer Olympics qualification. South Korea failed to qualify for the Olympics on goal difference, although their points were tied with Japan, the group winners.

Lee was lethargic while South Korea was eliminated in the group stage of the 1970 FIFA World Cup qualification, but he provided an assist for the winning goal in each of three matches against Laos, Malaysia, and Indonesia while winning the 1969 King's Cup after the failure in World Cup qualifiers.

Lee maintained the upturn at the 1970 Merdeka Tournament, scoring winning goals in a group stage match against Singapore, a semi-final match against India, and the final against Burma. On 5 September 1970, he scored the opener in a friendly against Benfica, which ended in a 1–1 draw after Eusébio's penalty equaliser. At the 1970 King's Cup, he had a goal against Hong Kong and two assists against Malaysia, helping South Korea defend their title.

At the 1970 Asian Games, Lee made efforts to won a major title. He scored the winning goal in a group stage match against Iran, and provided assists for all two of South Korea's goals in the semi-final win over Japan. After defeating their biggest rivals, South Korea shared the gold with Burma by drawing 0–0 in the final. That year, he was evaluated as the largest contributor to the national team's success including three Asian titles, being named the Korean FA Most Valuable Player.

Lee also played for South Korea at the 1972 AFC Asian Cup. He scored the winning goal in a group stage match against Khmer Republic. In the final against Iran, he provided an assist for the equaliser, but his team lost 2–1 after extra time.

On 2 June 1972, Lee scored a goal in a 3–2 friendly defeat to Santos, for which Pelé was playing.

== Style of play ==
Lee was nicknamed the "Leopard" in South Korea due to his innate stamina, rapid pace, and powerful shots. He was also proficient in creating chances, giving many key passes to other forwards in the middle.

== Managerial career ==
Lee managed POSCO Atoms from 1987 to 1992 and won two K Leagues. Lee also managed the South Korea national team from 1988 to 1990. He finished runner-up at the 1988 AFC Asian Cup, and earned nine wins and two draws without a defeat at the 1990 FIFA World Cup qualification. However, he lost all three matches in the group stage of the 1990 FIFA World Cup, struggling at world-class level.

== Administrative career ==
Between 2005 and 2013, Lee worked as a vice-president at the Korea Football Association. Lee recommended Cho Kwang-rae as a new manager of the national team in 2010, but started coming into conflict with him, who became manager. Lee was criticised for interfering in selection of the national team players. Without Cho's agreement, Lee arbitrarily moved some of senior team players to the Olympic team, and forcibly used players in a charity match prior to their travel to the 2011 AFC Asian Cup. According to Cho's claim, Lee also shouted at Cho when watching a list of the squad, which did not include players he recommended.

In 2023, he was appointed technical director of Gimpo FC, an honorary position, and has received salary.

In July 2024, when Park Ji-sung and Park Joo-ho criticised the KFA for keeping away from foreign managers through unfair procedure after hearing that Hong Myung-bo was appointed manager of the national team, Lee appealed to people employed in football to trust Hong, and demanded the two men respect their seniors and keep in mind that they will similarly become executives later. Lee was criticised for his remarks by fans.

== Career statistics ==
=== International ===
Appearances and goals by national team and year
| National team | Year | Apps | Goals |
|---|---|---|---|
| South Korea | 1966 | 1 | 0 |
| South Korea | 1967 | 18 | 8 |
| South Korea | 1968 | 6 | 2 |
| South Korea | 1969 | 8 | 1 |
| South Korea | 1970 | 18 | 5 |
| South Korea | 1971 | 9 | 2 |
| South Korea | 1972 | 11 | 2 |
| South Korea | 1974 | 8 | 1 |
| South Korea | 1977 | 3 | 0 |
| Career total | | 82 | 21 |

Appearances and goals by competition
| Competition | Apps | Goals |
|---|---|---|
| Friendlies | 8 | 0 |
| Minor competitions | 42 | 14 |
| Asian Games | 12 | 2 |
| AFC Asian Cup qualification | 4 | 1 |
| AFC Asian Cup | 4 | 1 |
| Summer Olympics qualification | 6 | 3 |
| FIFA World Cup qualification | 6 | 0 |
| Total | 82 | 21 |

Results list South Korea's goal tally first.

List of international goals scored by Lee Hoe-taik
| No. | Date | Venue | Cap | Opponent | Score | Result | Competition |
|---|---|---|---|---|---|---|---|
| 1 | 5 August 1967 | Taipei, Republic of China | 4 | Philippines | 1–0 | 7–0 | 1968 AFC Asian Cup qualification |
| 2 | 11 August 1967 | Kuala Lumpur, Malaysia | 6 | Indonesia | 3–1 | 3–1 | 1967 Pestabola Merdeka |
| 3 | 20 August 1967 | Kuala Lumpur, Malaysia | 9 | Singapore | 1–0 | 3–0 | 1967 Pestabola Merdeka |
| 4 | 23 August 1967 | Kuala Lumpur, Malaysia | 10 | Malaysia | 3–1 | 3–1 | 1967 Pestabola Merdeka |
| 5 | 28 September 1967 | Tokyo, Japan | 12 | Taiwan | 3–1 | 4–2 | 1968 Summer Olympics qualification |
| 6 | 7 October 1967 | Tokyo, Japan | 15 | Japan | 1–2 | 3–3 | 1968 Summer Olympics qualification |
| 7 | 9 October 1967 | Tokyo, Japan | 16 | Philippines | ?–0 | 5–0 | 1968 Summer Olympics qualification |
| 8 | 12 November 1967 | Saigon, South Vietnam | 18 | South Vietnam | 1–0 | 3–0 | 1967 South Vietnam Independence Cup |
| 9 | 12 August 1968 | Kuala Lumpur, Malaysia | 20 | Singapore | 1–2 | 3–2 | 1968 Pestabola Merdeka |
| 10 | 21 August 1968 | Kuala Lumpur, Malaysia | 23 | Thailand | 2–1 | 2–1 | 1968 Pestabola Merdeka |
| 11 | 21 November 1969 | Bangkok, Thailand | 31 | Malaysia | 2–0 | 2–0 | 1969 King's Cup |
| 12 | 4 August 1970 | Penang, Malaysia | 36 | Singapore | 1–0 | 4–0 | 1970 Pestabola Merdeka |
| 13 | 13 August 1970 | Kuala Lumpur, Malaysia | 39 | India | 3–2 | 3–2 | 1970 Pestabola Merdeka |
| 14 | 16 August 1970 | Kuala Lumpur, Malaysia | 40 | Burma | 1–0 | 1–0 | 1970 Pestabola Merdeka |
| 15 | 10 November 1970 | Bangkok, Thailand | 41 | Hong Kong | 2–0 | 3–0 | 1970 King's Cup |
| 16 | 11 December 1970 | Bangkok, Thailand | 46 | Iran | 1–0 | 1–0 | 1970 Asian Games |
| 17 | 9 May 1971 | Seoul, South Korea | 54 | Khmer Republic | 1–0 | 2–0 | 1971 Korea Cup |
| 18 | 9 May 1971 | Seoul, South Korea | 54 | Khmer Republic | 2–0 | 2–0 | 1971 Korea Cup |
| 19 | 10 May 1972 | Bangkok, Thailand | 61 | Khmer Republic | 2–0 | 4–1 | 1972 AFC Asian Cup |
| 20 | 23 July 1972 | Kuala Lumpur, Malaysia | 68 | Indonesia | 1–0 | 2–0 | 1972 Pestabola Merdeka |
| 21 | 13 September 1974 | Tehran, Iran | 78 | Malaysia | 1–1 | 2–3 | 1974 Asian Games |

== Honours ==
=== Player ===
Yangzee

- Korean National Championship: 1968
- Korean President's Cup: 1968
- Asian Champion Club Tournament runner-up: 1969

POSCO FC

- Korean National Semipro League (Spring): 1975
- Korean National Championship runner-up: 1977
- Korean President's Cup: 1974

South Korea

- Asian Games: 1970
- AFC Asian Cup runner-up: 1972

Individual

- Korean FA Best XI: 1969, 1970, 1971, 1972, 1974
- Korean FA Most Valuable Player: 1970
- Korean President's Cup Best Player: 1974
- Korean FA Hall of Fame: 2005

=== Manager ===
Hanyang University

- Korean National Championship: 1983

POSCO Atoms

- K League 1: 1988, 1992

South Korea

- AFC Asian Cup runner-up: 1988

Individual

- K League 1 Manager of the Year: 1988, 1992
- K League All-Star: 2000
