= 1972 President's Cup Football Tournament =

1972 President's Cup
Tournament details
- Host country: South Korea
- Dates: 20–30 September
- Teams: 8

Final positions
- Champions: Burma (2nd title)
- Runners-up: Indonesia
- Third place: South Korea
- Fourth place: Malaysia

Tournament statistics
- Matches played: 18
- Goals scored: 55 (3.06 per match)
- Top scorer(s): (Indonesia) Abdul Kadir (6 goals)

The 1972 President's Cup Football Tournament (Korean: 제2회 박대통령컵 쟁탈 아시아축구대회) was the second competition of Korea Cup. The competition was held from 20 to 30 September 1972, and was won by Burma for the second time, who defeated Indonesia in the final.

== Group stage ==
=== Group A ===
Team	Pld	W	D	L	GF	GA	GD	Pts	Qualification
South Korea	3	3	0	0	8	1	+7	6	Qualification to semi-finals
Malaysia	3	1	1	1	2	3	−1	3	Qualification to semi-finals
Thailand	3	0	2	1	1	4	−3	2	
Khmer Republic	3	0	1	2	1	4	−3	1	

20 September 1972
18:00

South Korea	3–0	Thailand
Park Lee-chun 14'; Park Su-deok 33'; Cha Bum-kun 70'	Report

Dongdaemun Stadium, Seoul

20 September 1972

Malaysia	1–0	Khmer Republic
Chin Aun 44'	Report

22 September 1972
18:40

South Korea	3–1	Khmer Republic
Park Lee-chun 26' (pen.); Kim Jin-kook 32', 61'	Report	Khath 85'

Dongdaemun Stadium, Seoul

22 September 1972

Thailand	1–1	Malaysia
Niwatana 50'	Report	Chin Aun 62'

24 September 1972
16:40

South Korea	2–0	Malaysia
Park Lee-chun 20' (pen.), 80'	Report

Dongdaemun Stadium, Seoul

24 September 1972

Thailand	0–0	Khmer Republic

=== Group B ===
Team	Pld	W	D	L	GF	GA	GD	Pts	Qualification
Indonesia	3	2	1	0	15	2	+13	5	Qualification to semi-finals
Burma	3	2	1	0	6	1	+5	5	Qualification to semi-finals
Singapore	3	1	0	2	6	3	+3	2	
Philippines	3	0	0	3	0	21	−21	0	

21 September 1972

Burma	4–0	Philippines
Win Maung 2', 14'; Ye Nyunt 33'; Tin Win 74'	Report

21 September 1972

Indonesia	2–1	Singapore
Kadir 26', 87' (pen.)	Report	M. Kumar 73'

23 September 1972

Burma	1–1	Indonesia
Aye Maung 88'	Report	Idris 54'

23 September 1972

Singapore	5–0	Philippines
Seak 11'; Arshad 15'; Lim 44'; Mohammed 78', 86'	Report

25 September 1972

Philippines	0–12	Indonesia
	Report	Sihasale 3'; Kadir ?', ?'; Santos ?', ?'; Idris ?', ?', ?'

25 September 1972

Singapore	0–1	Burma
	Report	Khin Win 57'

== Knockout stage ==
=== Bracket ===
Semi-finals
27 September – Seoul
South Korea	0
Burma	1
28 September – Seoul
Indonesia (a.e.t.)	3
Malaysia	1

Final
30 September – Seoul
Burma	3
Indonesia	1
Third place play-off
30 September – Seoul
South Korea	1
Malaysia	0

=== Seventh place play-off ===
27 September 1972

Khmer Republic	1–0	Philippines
Sea 84'	Report

=== Fifth place play-off ===
28 September 1972

Thailand	4–1	Singapore
Prapong 12', 69'; Kitboon 46', 57'	Report	Arshad 63'

=== Semi-finals ===
27 September 1972
19:40

South Korea	0–1	Burma
	Report	Ye Nyunt 23'

Dongdaemun Stadium, Seoul

28 September 1972

Indonesia	3–1 (a.e.t.)	Malaysia
Waskito 56'; Kadir 114', 118' (pen.)	Report	Shaharuddin 9'

=== Third place play-off ===
30 September 1972
15:00

South Korea	1–0	Malaysia
Park Su-deok 56'	Report

Dongdaemun Stadium, Seoul

=== Final ===
30 September 1972

Burma	3–1	Indonesia
Win Maung 35', 69', 78'	Report	Risdianto 53'

== See also ==
- Korea Cup
- South Korea national football team results
