= Hong Kong national football team results (1970–1979) =

- Win Draw Loss

This is a list of the Hong Kong national football team results from 1970 to 1979.

== 1970 ==
31 July 1970 Merdeka Tournament; Group 2	Japan	1–2	Hong Kong	Kuala Lumpur, Malaysia

2 August 1970 Merdeka Tournament; Group 2	Thailand	0–2	Hong Kong	Kuala Lumpur, Malaysia

4 August 1970 Merdeka Tournament; Group 2	Indonesia	3–1	Hong Kong	Kuala Lumpur, Malaysia

6 August 1970 Merdeka Tournament; Group 2	Singapore	2–3	Hong Kong	Kuala Lumpur, Malaysia

9 August 1970 Merdeka Tournament; Group 2	South Korea	0–0	Hong Kong	Kuala Lumpur, Malaysia

12 August 1970 Merdeka Tournament; Semi-finals	Hong Kong	0–5	Burma	Kuala Lumpur, Malaysia

15 August 1970 Merdeka Tournament; 3rd Place Match	India	3–2	Hong Kong	Kuala Lumpur, Malaysia

8 November 1970 King's Cup; Group A	Hong Kong	0–1	Singapore	Bangkok, Thailand

10 November 1970 King's Cup; Group A	South Korea	3–0	Hong Kong	Bangkok, Thailand

12 November 1970 King's Cup; Group A	Thailand	2–1	Hong Kong	Bangkok, Thailand

16 November 1970 King's Cup; Group A	Hong Kong	4–2	Laos	Bangkok, Thailand

== 1971 ==
2 May 1971 President's Cup; Group B	Hong Kong	2–0	South Vietnam	Seoul, Korea Republic
				Stadium: Seoul Stadium

4 May 1971 President's Cup; Group B	Burma	2–0	Hong Kong	Seoul, Korea Republic
				Stadium: Seoul Stadium

6 May 1971 President's Cup; Group B	Indonesia	2–1	Hong Kong	Seoul, Korea Republic
				Stadium: Seoul Stadium

22 May 1972 AFC Asian Cup; Qualification Central Zone; Allocation Match	Indonesia	2–1	Hong Kong	Bangkok, Thailand

24 May 1972 AFC Asian Cup; Qualification Central Zone; Group B	Khmer Republic	2–1	Hong Kong	Bangkok, Thailand

28 May 1972 AFC Asian Cup; Qualification Central Zone; Group B	Malaysia	2–1	Hong Kong	Bangkok, Thailand

7 August 1971 Merdeka Tournament; Group 2	Philippines	1–2	Hong Kong	Kuala Lumpur, Malaysia

8 August 1971 Merdeka Tournament; Group 2	Indonesia	3–0	Hong Kong	Kuala Lumpur, Malaysia

11 August 1971 Merdeka Tournament; Group 2	Hong Kong	0–4	Burma	Kuala Lumpur, Malaysia

14 August 1971 Merdeka Tournament; Group 2	Singapore	2–1	Hong Kong	Kuala Lumpur, Malaysia

17 August 1971 Merdeka Tournament; Group 2	India	1–2	Hong Kong	Kuala Lumpur, Malaysia

21 August 1971 Merdeka Tournament; 7th Place Match	South Vietnam	3–1	Hong Kong	Kuala Lumpur, Malaysia

== 1972 ==
25 July 1972 Merdeka Tournament; Group 2	Singapore	1–4	Hong Kong	Kuala Lumpur, Malaysia

30 July 1972 Merdeka Tournament; Group 2	Indonesia	0–1	Hong Kong	Kuala Lumpur, Malaysia

3 August 1972 Merdeka Tournament; Group 2	South Korea	0–0	Hong Kong	Kuala Lumpur, Malaysia

6 August 1972 Merdeka Tournament; Group 2	Thailand	2–2	Hong Kong	Kuala Lumpur, Malaysia

10 August 1972 Merdeka Tournament; 5th Place Match	Hong Kong	0–1	Khmer Republic	Kuala Lumpur, Malaysia

== 1973 ==
17 May 1974 FIFA World Cup; Qualification Zone A Classification Match	Hong Kong	1–0	Malaysia	Seoul, Korea Republic
	Lo Hung Hoi			Referee: Azam (India)

22 May 1974 FIFA World Cup; Qualification Zone A Group 1	Japan	0–1	Hong Kong	Seoul, Korea Republic
				Referee: Boskovic (Australia)

24 May 1974 FIFA World Cup; Qualification Zone A Group 1	Hong Kong	1–0	South Vietnam	Seoul, Korea Republic
				Referee: Aing Kim Ean (Khmer Republic)

26 May 1974 FIFA World Cup; Qualification Zona A Semi-finals	South Korea	3–1	Hong Kong	Seoul, Korea Republic
				Referee: Hatta (Indonesia

== 1974 ==
20 February International friendly	Hong Kong	0–0	Japan	British Hong Kong

23 July 1974 Merdeka Tournament; Allocation Match	Indonesia	5–2	Hong Kong	Kuala Lumpur, Malaysia

27 July 1974 Merdeka Tournament; Group Stage	India	2–2	Hong Kong	Kuala Lumpur, Malaysia

29 July 1974 Merdeka Tournament; Group Stage	Malaysia	1–0	Hong Kong	Kuala Lumpur, Malaysia

1 August 1974 Merdeka Tournament; Semi-finals	South Korea	3–3 (a.e.t.) (5–4 p)	Hong Kong	Kuala Lumpur, Malaysia

3 August 1974 Merdeka Tournament; 3rd Place Match	Thailand	0–1	Hong Kong	Kuala Lumpur, Malaysia
			Leung Kan Fat 30'

== 1975 ==
14 June 1976 AFC Asian Cup; Qualification Group 3 Allocation Match	Hong Kong	0–0 (a.e.t.) (4–3 p)	Japan	So Kon Po, British Hong Kong
				Stadium: Government Stadium; Attendance: 26,000; Referee: Watana (Thailand)

17 June 1976 AFC Asian Cup; Qualification Group 3A	Hong Kong	3–0	Brunei	So Kon Po, British Hong Kong
				Stadium: Government Stadium

21 June 1976 AFC Asian Cup; Qualification Group 3A	Hong Kong	0–1	China	So Kon Po, British Hong Kong
				Stadium: Government Stadium

24 June 1976 AFC Asian Cup; Qualification Group 3 Semi-finals	Hong Kong	3–3 (a.e.t.) (10–11 p)	North Korea	So Kon Po, British Hong Kong
				Stadium: Government Stadium

26 June 1976 AFC Asian Cup; Qualification Group 3; 3rd Place Match	Hong Kong	0–1	Japan	So Kon Po, British Hong Kong
18:30 (UTC+8)			Watanabe 6'	Stadium: Government Stadium; Attendance: 30,000; Referee: Hashita (Indonesia)

29 July 1975 Merdeka Tournament; Group Stage	South Korea	3–1	Hong Kong	Kuala Lumpur, Malaysia

30 July 1975 Merdeka Tournament; Group Stage	Japan	0–2	Hong Kong	Kuala Lumpur, Malaysia

31 July 1975 Merdeka Tournament; Group Stage	Malaysia	3–1	Hong Kong	Kuala Lumpur, Malaysia

4 August 1975 Merdeka Tournament; Group Stage	Hong Kong	9–1	Bangladesh	Kuala Lumpur, Malaysia

6 August 1975 Merdeka Tournament; Group Stage	Thailand	0–3	Hong Kong	Kuala Lumpur, Malaysia

9 August 1975 Merdeka Tournament; Group Stage	Hong Kong	0–5	Burma	Kuala Lumpur, Malaysia

14 August 1975 Merdeka Tournament; Group Stage	Indonesia	3–2	Hong Kong	Kuala Lumpur, Malaysia

== 1976 ==
11 August International friendly	Australia	0–1	Hong Kong	Canberra, Australia

18 August International friendly	Australia	2–0	Hong Kong	Gosford, Australia

24 October International friendly	Hong Kong	0–2	Australia	British Hong Kong

== 1977 ==
28 February 1978 FIFA World Cup; Qualification 1st Round Group 1	Hong Kong	4–1	Indonesia	Singapore
	Chung Chor Wai 61' (pen.); Wan Chi Keung 67'; Kwok Ka Ming 71'; Lau Wing Yip 83'		Waskito 12'	Referee: Namdar (Iran)

2 March 1978 FIFA World Cup; Qualification 1st Round Group 1	Hong Kong	2–2	Singapore	Singapore
	Quah Kim Song 37'; Dollah Kassim 70'		21'; 52'	Referee: Harries (New Zealand)

5 March 1978 FIFA World Cup; Qualification 1st Round Group 1	Thailand	1–2	Hong Kong	Singapore
				Referee: Kim Joo-Won (Korea Republic)

8 March 1978 FIFA World Cup; Qualification 1st Round Group 1	Malaysia	1–1	Hong Kong	Singapore
	Ibni 78'		Fung Chi Ming 15'	Referee: Harries (New Zealand)

12 March 1978 FIFA World Cup; Qualification 1st Round Playoff	Singapore	0–1	Hong Kong	Singapore
				Referee: Boskovic (Australia)

19 June 1978 FIFA World Cup; Qualification Final Round	Hong Kong	0–2	Iran	British Hong Kong
			Kazerani 22'; Jahani 77'	Referee: Gussoni (Italy)

26 June 1978 FIFA World Cup; Qualification Final Round	Hong Kong	0–1	South Korea	British Hong Kong
				Referee: Biwersi (West Germany)

10 July 1978 FIFA World Cup; Qualification Final Round	Australia	3–0	Hong Kong	Adelaide, Australia
	Kosmina; Barnes			Referee: Hungerbühler (Switzerland)

17 July 1978 Beijing International; Friendship Tournament	China	2–1	Hong Kong	Beijing, China

28 July 1978 Beijing International; Friendship Tournament	China	1–2	Hong Kong	Beijing, China

2 October 1978 FIFA World Cup; Qualification Final Round	Hong Kong	1–3	Kuwait	British Hong Kong
	Chung Chor Wai		Al-Dakheel; Bo-Homod; Yaqoub	Referee: Martinez (Spain)

30 October 1978 FIFA World Cup; Qualification Final Round	Hong Kong	2–5	Australia	British Hong Kong
	Tang Hung Cheong 65'; Chung Chor Wai 80'		Ollerton 19', 31', 65'; Abonyi 39'; Bennett 85'	Referee: Ponnet (Belgium)

12 November 1978 FIFA World Cup; Qualification Final Round	Kuwait	4–0	Hong Kong	Kuwait City, Kuwait
	Al-Dakheel 3', 17'; Al-Anbari 45'; Kameel 80'			Referee: Victor (Luxembourg)

18 November 1978 FIFA World Cup; Qualification Final Round	Iran	3–0	Hong Kong	Tehran, Iran
	Jahani 3', 35'; Kazerani 19'			Referee: Raus (Yugoslavia)

4 December 1978 FIFA World Cup; Qualification Final Round	South Korea	5–2	Hong Kong	Busan, Korea Republic
				Referee: Aldinger (West Germany)

== 1978 ==
No any matches were played in 1978.

== 1979 ==
2 May 1980 AFC Asian Cup; Qualification Group 3 Allocation Match	North Korea	3–0	Hong Kong	Bangkok, Thailand

4 May 1980 AFC Asian Cup; Qualification Group 3B	Hong Kong	3–1	Singapore	Bangkok, Thailand

6 May 1980 AFC Asian Cup; Qualification Group 3B	Hong Kong	5–0	Sri Lanka	Bangkok, Thailand

8 May 1980 AFC Asian Cup; Qualification Group 3B	Thailand	1–0	Hong Kong	Bangkok, Thailand

11 May 1980 AFC Asian Cup; Qualification Group 3 Semi-finals	Malaysia	0–0 (a.e.t.) (5–4 p)	Hong Kong	Bangkok, Thailand

22 May 1980 AFC Asian Cup; Qualification Group 3; 3rd place playoff	Thailand	1–2	Hong Kong	Bangkok, Thailand
