= 1971 President's Cup Football Tournament =

1971 President's Cup
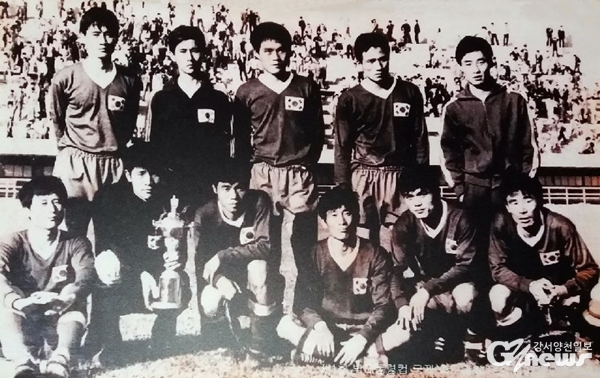
- The winning South Korean squad of the tournament

Tournament details
- Host country: South Korea
- Dates: 2–15 May
- Teams: 8

Final positions
- Champions: South Korea (1st title); Burma (1st title)
- Third place: Indonesia
- Fourth place: Malaysia

Tournament statistics
- Matches played: 17
- Goals scored: 64 (3.76 per match)
- Top scorer: (Indonesia) Iswadi Idris (7 goals)

The 1971 President's Cup Football Tournament (Korean: 제1회 박대통령컵 쟁탈 아시아축구대회) was the first competition of Korea Cup. The competition was held from 2 to 15 May 1971. South Korea and Burma played out a 0–0 draw and shared the trophy.

== Group stage ==
=== Group A ===
Team	Pld	W	D	L	GF	GA	GD	Pts	Qualification
South Korea	3	3	0	0	8	1	+7	6	Qualification to semi-finals
Malaysia	3	2	0	1	8	7	+1	4	Qualification to semi-finals
Thailand	3	1	0	2	5	8	−3	2	
Khmer Republic	3	0	0	3	4	9	−5	0	

2 May 1971
15:00 (UTC+9)

South Korea	1–0	Thailand
Park Lee-chun 73'	Report; Newscast

Dongdaemun Stadium, Seoul

3 May 1971
18:00 (UTC+9)

Malaysia	3–1	Khmer Republic
Ahmad 25', 80'; Salleh 33' (pen.)	Report	Doeur 65'

Dongdaemun Stadium, Seoul

5 May 1971
19:50 (UTC+9)

Thailand	4–3	Khmer Republic

Dongdaemun Stadium, Seoul

6 May 1971
19:50 (UTC+9)

South Korea	5–1	Malaysia
Jeong Kang-ji 15', 37'; Park Lee-chun 22'; Kim Ki-bok 44'; Chung Kyoo-Poong 64'	Report	Hamzah 48'

Dongdaemun Stadium, Seoul

8 May 1971
15:00 (UTC+9)

Thailand	1–4	Malaysia

Dongdaemun Stadium, Seoul

9 May 1971
16:50 (UTC+9)

South Korea	2–0	Khmer Republic
Lee Hoe-taik 38', 67'	Report

Dongdaemun Stadium, Seoul

=== Group B ===
Team	Pld	W	D	L	GF	GA	GD	Pts	Qualification
Burma	3	3	0	0	7	1	+6	6	Qualification to semi-finals
Indonesia	3	2	0	1	12	5	+7	4	Qualification to semi-finals
Hong Kong	3	1	0	2	3	4	−1	2	
South Vietnam	3	0	0	3	1	13	−12	0	

2 May 1971
16:30 (UTC+9)

Indonesia	9–1	South Vietnam

Dongdaemun Stadium, Seoul

3 May 1971
19:50 (UTC+9)

Burma	2–0	Hong Kong

Dongdaemun Stadium, Seoul

5 May 1971
18:00 (UTC+9)

Hong Kong	1–2	Indonesia
? 85'	Report	Junaeri 2'; Kadir 65'

Dongdaemun Stadium, Seoul

6 May 1971
18:00 (UTC+9)

South Vietnam	0–2	Burma

Dongdaemun Stadium, Seoul

8 May 1971
16:50 (UTC+9)

Burma	3–1	Indonesia
Maung Maung Tin 57' (pen.); Than Soe 75'; Win Maung 87'	Report	Kadir 11' (pen.)

Dongdaemun Stadium, Seoul

9 May 1971
15:00 (UTC+9)

Hong Kong	2–0	South Vietnam

Dongdaemun Stadium, Seoul

== Knockout stage ==
=== Bracket ===
Semi-finals
11 May – Seoul
South Korea	3
Indonesia	0
11 May – Seoul
Burma	6
Malaysia	1

Final
13 and 15 May – Seoul
South Korea (a.e.t.)	0 (0)
Burma	0 (0)
Third place play-off
13 May – Seoul
Indonesia	4
Malaysia	2

=== Semi-finals ===
11 May 1971

South Korea	3–0	Indonesia
Chung Kyu-poong 12', 66'; Mudayat 31' (o.g.)	Report

Dongdaemun Stadium, Seoul

11 May 1971

Burma	6–1	Malaysia

Dongdaemun Stadium, Seoul

=== Third place play-off ===
13 May 1971
17:00 (UTC+9)

Indonesia	4–2	Malaysia
Idris 20', 24'; Ghani (?); Sihasale (?)	Report	Namat 32'; Salleh (?)

Dongdaemun Stadium, Seoul

=== Final ===
13 May 1971
18:50 (UTC+9)

South Korea	0–0	Burma
	Report; Newscast

Dongdaemun Stadium, Seoul

Replay

15 May 1971
15:00 (UTC+9)

South Korea	0–0 (a.e.t.)	Burma
	Report; Newscast

Dongdaemun Stadium, Seoul

== See also ==
- Korea Cup
- South Korea national football team results
