= 1979 President's Cup Football Tournament =

1979 President's Cup
Tournament details
- Host country: South Korea
- Dates: 8–21 September
- Teams: 10

Final positions
- Champions: (Brazil) Vitória-ES (1st title)
- Runners-up: South Korea
- Third place: Bahrain
- Fourth place: South Korea B

Tournament statistics
- Matches played: 24
- Goals scored: 91 (3.79 per match)
- Top scorer: (Brazil) João Francisco (8 goals)

The 1979 President's Cup Football Tournament (Korean: 제9회 대통령배 국제축구대회) was the ninth competition of Korea Cup. It was held from 8 to 21 September 1979, and was won by a Brazilian club Vitória-ES for the first time, who defeated South Korea in the final.

== Group stage ==
=== Group A ===
Team	Pld	W	D	L	GF	GA	GD	Pts	Qualification
South Korea	4	4	0	0	28	1	+27	8	Qualification to semi-finals
Bahrain	4	3	0	1	5	5	0	6	Qualification to semi-finals
Sudan	4	2	0	2	5	10	−5	4	
Bangladesh	4	1	0	3	4	16	−12	2	
Sri Lanka	4	0	0	4	1	11	−10	0	

8 September 1979
15:30 UTC+9

South Korea	8–0	Sudan
Park Sung-hwa 2', 32'; Shin Hyun-ho 3', 88'; Mukhtar 12' (o.g.); Huh Jung-moo 22'; Cho Kwang-rae 34'; Yoo Keon-soo 73'	Report 1 Report 2 Newscast

Dongdaemun Stadium, Seoul

8 September 1979
17:15 UTC+9

Bahrain	2–0	Bangladesh
? 29'; Sultan 62'	Report

Dongdaemun Stadium, Seoul

10 September 1979
14:00 UTC+9

Sudan	4–1	Bangladesh
Mohamedin 7', 64'; El-Sayed 63', 85'	Report	Chunnu 66'

Dongdaemun Stadium, Seoul

10 September 1979
15:45 UTC+9

Bahrain	1–0	Sri Lanka
? 18'	Report

Dongdaemun Stadium, Seoul

12 September 1979
17:00 UTC+9

Sudan	0–1	Bahrain
	Report	Hassan 27' (o.g.)

Daegu Civic Stadium, Daegu

12 September 1979
18:45 UTC+9

South Korea	6–0	Sri Lanka
Huh Jung-moo 28'; Shin Hyun-ho 37', 40'; Lee Jung-il 62'; Yoo Keon-soo 71'; Lee Young-moo 86'	Report 1 Report 2

Daegu Civic Stadium, Daegu

14 September 1979
14:00 UTC+9

Bangladesh	3–1	Sri Lanka
Aslam (?); Chunnu (?); Yusuf (?)	Report	? (?)

Cheongju Sports Complex, Cheongju

14 September 1979
15:45 UTC+9

South Korea	5–1	Bahrain
Park Sung-hwa 1'; Lee Young-moo 8', 77'; Lee Jang-soo 83'; Lee Jung-il 88'	Report	Jawed 57'

Cheongju Sports Complex, Cheongju

16 September 1979
14:00 UTC+9

Sudan	1–0	Sri Lanka
Abyu 71'	Report

Incheon Sungui Stadium, Incheon

16 September 1979
15:45 UTC+9

South Korea	9–0	Bangladesh
Huh Jung-moo 50', 66', 83'; Park Sung-hwa 52', 55'; Cho Kwang-rae 60', 78', 89'; Park Chang-sun 88'	Report

Incheon Sungui Stadium, Incheon

=== Group B ===
Team	Pld	W	D	L	GF	GA	GD	Pts	Qualification
(Brazil) Vitória-ES	4	4	0	0	16	2	+14	8	Qualification to semi-finals
South Korea B	4	3	0	1	8	2	+6	6	Qualification to semi-finals
Thailand	4	1	1	2	3	9	−6	3	
Malaysia B	4	1	1	2	4	12	−8	3	
Indonesia	4	0	0	4	4	10	−6	0	

9 September 1979
14:00 UTC+9

Thailand	2–0	Indonesia
Pongthai 60'; Madard 73'	Report

Dongdaemun Stadium, Seoul

9 September 1979
15:45 UTC+9

South Korea B	1–2	(Brazil) Vitória-ES
Cho Kwan-sup 55'	Report	Francisco 25'; Naldo 54'

Dongdaemun Stadium, Seoul

11 September 1979
14:00 UTC+9

Vitória-ES (Brazil)	3–1	Indonesia
Naldo 2'; Mazini 10'; Francisco 55'	Report	Sumarno 87'

Dongdaemun Stadium, Seoul

11 September 1979
15:45 UTC+9

Thailand	1–1	Malaysia B
? 17'	Report	Ismail 9'

Dongdaemun Stadium, Seoul

13 September 1979
17:00 UTC+9

Vitória-ES (Brazil)	6–0	Thailand
Joadir Silva 19'; Francisco 32', 40', 63'; Isaias 50', 88'	Report

Busan Gudeok Stadium, Busan

13 September 1979
18:45 UTC+9

South Korea B	4–0	Malaysia B
Choi Jong-geol 31', 58' (pen.); Song Dae-sung 44'; Park Hang-seo 55'	Report

Busan Gudeok Stadium, Busan

15 September 1979
14:00 UTC+9

Vitória-ES (Brazil)	5–0	Malaysia B
Francisco (?)

Gwangju Mudeung Stadium, Gwangju

15 September 1979
15:45 UTC+9

South Korea B	2–0	Indonesia
Kim Myung-duk 28'; Chung Yong-an 65'	Report

Gwangju Mudeung Stadium, Gwangju

17 September 1979
17:00 UTC+9

Indonesia	2–3	Malaysia B
Muryanto 9'; ? 48'	Report	Ismail 22', 35'; Remeli 29'

Dongdaemun Stadium, Seoul

17 September 1979
18:45 UTC+9

South Korea B	1–0	Thailand
Chung Yong-an 18'	Report

Dongdaemun Stadium, Seoul

== Knockout stage ==
=== Bracket ===
Semi-finals
19 September – Seoul
South Korea	4
South Korea B	1
19 September – Seoul
(Brazil) Vitória-ES (p)	2 (5)
Bahrain	2 (4)

Final
21 September – Seoul
South Korea	1
(Brazil) Vitória-ES (a.e.t.)	2
Third place play-off
21 September – Seoul
South Korea B	0
Bahrain	1

=== Semi-finals ===
19 September 1979
16:00 UTC+9

Vitória-ES (Brazil)	2–2 (a.e.t.)	Bahrain
Isaias 18'; Naldo 25'	Report	Ahed 68'; Bushager 81'
Penalties
	5–4

Dongdaemun Stadium, Seoul

19 September 1979
17:45 UTC+9

South Korea	4–1	South Korea B
Cho Kwang-rae 52', 75'; Huh Jung-moo 64', 89'	Report	Park Hang-seo 31'

Dongdaemun Stadium, Seoul

=== Third place play-off ===
21 September 1979
16:00 UTC+9

South Korea B	0–1	Bahrain
	Report	? 42'

Dongdaemun Stadium, Seoul

=== Final ===
21 September 1979
17:45 UTC+9

South Korea	1–2 (a.e.t.)	(Brazil) Vitória-ES
Cho Kwang-rae 27'	Report	Castro 20'; Joadir Silva 95'

Dongdaemun Stadium, Seoul

== See also ==
- Korea Cup
- South Korea national football team results
