= Lee Young-moo =

South Korean footballer (born 1953)

Personal information
- Full name: Lee Young-moo
- Date of birth: 26 July 1953 (age 73)
- Place of birth: Goyang, Gyeonggi, South Korea
- Height: 1.65 m (5 ft 5 in)
- Position: Midfielder

Youth career
- Kyunghee Middle School
- Kyunghee High School

College career
Years	Team	Apps	(Gls)
1973–1976	Kyung Hee University		

Senior career*
Years	Team	Apps	(Gls)
1977–1978	POSCO FC		
1978–1980	ROK Army (draft)		
1981–1982	Hallelujah FC		

International career
1972–1973	South Korea U20		
1975–1981	South Korea	85	(27)

Managerial career
- 1983–1992: Immanuel FC
- 1992–1998: E-Land Puma
- 1999–2005: Gimpo Hallelujah
- 2009–2011: Ansan Hallelujah
- 2011–2012: TTM Phichit
- 2012–2014: Goyang Hi FC
- 2015: Goyang Hi FC
Medal record
Representing South Korea
Men's football
Asian Games
Gold medal – first place	1978 Bangkok
AFC Asian Cup
Silver medal – second place	1980 Kuwait
AFC Youth Championship
Runner-up	1972 Thailand
Bronze medal – third place	1973 Iran
- * Club domestic league appearances and goals

- Lee Young-moo
- Hangul: 이영무
- Hanja: 李栄武
- RR: I Yeongmu
- MR: I Yŏngmu

Lee Young-moo (Korean: 이영무, born 26 July 1953) is a former South Korean football player.

== Style of play ==
Lee did not have a great technique or physique, but he showed tremendous work rate, which made his role hard to distinguish. He was designated as an attacking midfielder in the starting line-up, but his movement on the field was wide ranging regardless of the placement. According to the introduction of the Korea Football Association, he left behind an unofficial record that he moved about 20 km in a match, although it needs more convincing evidence.

== Personal life ==
Lee is a committed Christian. He always did prayer ceremonies when he scored goals. His religious belief also helped his stamina and diligence.

== Career statistics ==
=== International ===
Appearances and goals by national team and year
National team	Year	Apps	Goals
South Korea	1975	19	9
South Korea	1976	18	4
South Korea	1977	9	3
South Korea	1978	17	8
South Korea	1979	5	3
South Korea	1980	14	0
South Korea	1981	3	0
Career total		85	27

Appearances and goals by competition
Competition	Apps	Goals
Friendlies	7	2
Minor competitions	45	17
Asian Games	6	1
AFC Asian Cup qualification	2	3
AFC Asian Cup	6	0
Summer Olympics qualification	11	2
FIFA World Cup qualification	8	2
Total	85	27

Results list South Korea's goal tally first.

List of international goals scored by Lee Young-moo
No.	Date	Venue	Cap	Opponent	Score	Result	Competition
1	16 June 1975	Jakarta, Indonesia	4	Malaysia	1–1	1–1 (a.e.t.) (3–4 p)	1975 Jakarta Anniversary Tournament
2	7 August 1975	Kuala Lumpur, Malaysia	9	Thailand	6–0	6–0	1975 Pestabola Merdeka
3	17 August 1975	Kuala Lumpur, Malaysia	13	Malaysia	1–0	1–0	1975 Pestabola Merdeka
4	8 September 1975	Seoul, South Korea	14	Japan	3–0	3–0	Friendly
5	14 December 1975	Kaohsiung, Republic of China	15	Taiwan	2–0	2–0	1976 Summer Olympics qualification
6	27 December 1975	Bangkok, Thailand	18	Indonesia	2–0	2–0	1975 King's Cup
7	30 December 1975	Bangkok, Thailand	19	Singapore	2–0	5–0	1975 King's Cup
8	30 December 1975	Bangkok, Thailand	19	Singapore	4–0	5–0	1975 King's Cup
9	30 December 1975	Bangkok, Thailand	19	Singapore	5–0	5–0	1975 King's Cup
10	21 March 1976	Tokyo, Japan	22	Japan	1–0	2–0	1976 Summer Olympics qualification
11	13 September 1976	Seoul, South Korea	32	India	1–0	4–0	1976 Korea Cup
12	13 September 1976	Seoul, South Korea	32	India	3–0	4–0	1976 Korea Cup
13	17 September 1976	Seoul, South Korea	33	Singapore	3–0	7–0	1976 Korea Cup
14	14 February 1977	Singapore	38	Singapore	2–0	4–0	Friendly
15	11 November 1977	Tehran, Iran	46	Iran	1–0	2–2	1978 FIFA World Cup qualification
16	11 November 1977	Tehran, Iran	46	Iran	2–2	2–2	1978 FIFA World Cup qualification
17	12 July 1978	Kuala Lumpur, Malaysia	47	Malaysia	3–1	3–1	1978 Pestabola Merdeka
18	14 July 1978	Kuala Lumpur, Malaysia	48	Thailand	3–0	3–0	1978 Pestabola Merdeka
19	29 July 1978	Kuala Lumpur, Malaysia	53	Iraq	1–0	2–0	1978 Pestabola Merdeka
20	13 September 1978	Daegu, South Korea	55	Bahrain	2–1	3–1	1978 Korea Cup
21	15 December 1978	Bangkok, Thailand	58	Japan	1–0	3–1	1978 Asian Games
22	25 December 1978	Manila, Philippines	62	Macau	2–0	4–1	1980 AFC Asian Cup qualification
23	25 December 1978	Manila, Philippines	62	Macau	3–0	4–1	1980 AFC Asian Cup qualification
24	25 December 1978	Manila, Philippines	62	Macau	4–0	4–1	1980 AFC Asian Cup qualification
25	12 September 1979	Daegu, South Korea	66	Sri Lanka	6–0	6–0	1979 Korea Cup
26	14 September 1979	Jeonju, South Korea	67	Bahrain	2–0	5–1	1979 Korea Cup
27	14 September 1979	Jeonju, South Korea	67	Bahrain	3–1	5–1	1979 Korea Cup

== Honours ==
=== Player ===
POSCO FC

- Korean National Championship runner-up: 1977

ROK Army

- Korean National Semipro League (Spring): 1980
- Korean National Championship: 1979
- Korean President's Cup runner-up: 1980

South Korea U20

- AFC Youth Championship runner-up: 1972

South Korea

- Asian Games: 1978
- AFC Asian Cup runner-up: 1980

Individual

- Korean FA Best XI: 1975, 1976, 1977, 1978, 1979, 1980
- Korean National Championship Best Player: 1979
- AFC Asian Cup Team of the Tournament: 1980
- Korean FA Most Valuable Player: 1980

=== Manager ===
E-Land Puma

- Korean National Semipro League (Spring): 1995, 1996
- Korean National Championship: 1994, 1995
- Korean National Semipro Championship: 1995
- Korean President's Cup: 1994

Hallelujah FC (1999)

- Korean President's Cup runner-up: 2002

Individual

- Korean National Championship Best Manager: 1994
