= Dongdaemun Baseball Stadium =

Stadium in Seoul (1959–2007)

- Interactive map of Dongdaemun Baseball Stadium
- Location: Gwanghui-dong, Jung-gu, Seoul, South Korea
- Coordinates: 37°34′0.22″N 127°0′33.29″E
- Operator: Seoul Sports Facilities Management
- Capacity: 26,874
- Surface: Natural grass (1959–1989); Artificial turf (1990–2007)
- Field size: Left Field – 98 metres (322 ft); Center Field – 118 metres (387 ft)

Construction
- Built: 1959
- Closed: December 2007
- Demolished: March 2008

Tenants
- OB Bears (1985); MBC Chungyong (1982)

Dongdaemun Baseball Stadium (Korean: 동대문야구장) was a multi-purpose stadium in Seoul, South Korea. It was used mostly for baseball games. The stadium held 26,874 people. The stadium was built in 1959 and was demolished in 2007, along with Dongdaemun Stadium. It has been replaced by Dongdaemun Design Plaza, which opened in 2014. A new baseball stadium, the Gocheok Sky Dome, was completed in the Guro district in 2015, and serves as a replacement to Dongdaemun Baseball Stadium.

== See also ==
- Jamsil Baseball Stadium
- Mokdong Baseball Stadium
- Gocheok Sky Dome
