= Jeong Kang-ji =

South Korean footballer (born 1943)

Jeong Kang-ji 정강지
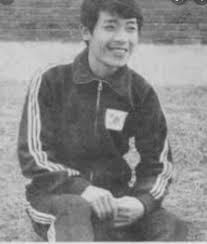

Personal information
- Full name: Jeong Kang-ji
- Date of birth: October 5, 1943 (age 83)
- Place of birth: Jinju, Keishōnan-dō, Chōsen, Japan
- Height: 1.67 m (5 ft 6 in)
- Position: Forward

Youth career
- 1962: Gaesung High School
- 1963–1964: Korea University

Senior career*
| Years | Team | Apps | (Gls) |
| 1968–1969 | Yangzee | | |
| 1969–1970 | → ROK Army (draft) | | |
| 1971–1974 | Korea Trust Bank | | |

International career
| 1962–1963 | South Korea U20 | 8 | (2) |
| 1964–1966 | South Korea B | 21 | (2) |
| 1966–1974 | South Korea | 21 | (3) |
Medal record
Men's football
Representing South Korea (as player)
Asian Games
| Gold medal – first place | 1970 Bangkok | Team |
- * Club domestic league appearances and goals

- Jeong Kang-ji
- Hangul: 정강지
- Hanja: 鄭康芝
- RR: Jeong Gangji
- MR: Chŏng Kangji

Jeong Kang-ji (Korean: 정강지; Hanja: 鄭康芝, born October 5, 1943) is a South Korean former footballer who played as a forward. He played for Yangzee and Korea Trust Bank on a club level and represented South Korea at the 1966 Asian Games and the 1970 Asian Games where he was part of the winning squad in the football tournament.

== Club career ==
Jeong would begin his football career by playing for Gaesung High School at Busan in around 1962. Beginning in 1963, Keong would play for Korea University and would enjoy success as a rising star within the university, being attributed to the successes of the club that year. He would continue to play for the university in 1964, 1965 and 1966. He would play his final season for the university in 1967 before signing up to play for Yangzee. He would later be part of the winning squad of the 1968 Korean National Football Championship. In the 1969 season, he would be part of the runners-up squad for the 1969 Asian Champion Club Tournament. However, he would be conscripted to play for the Republic of Korea Army and would play for them in both the 1969 and 1970 seasons.

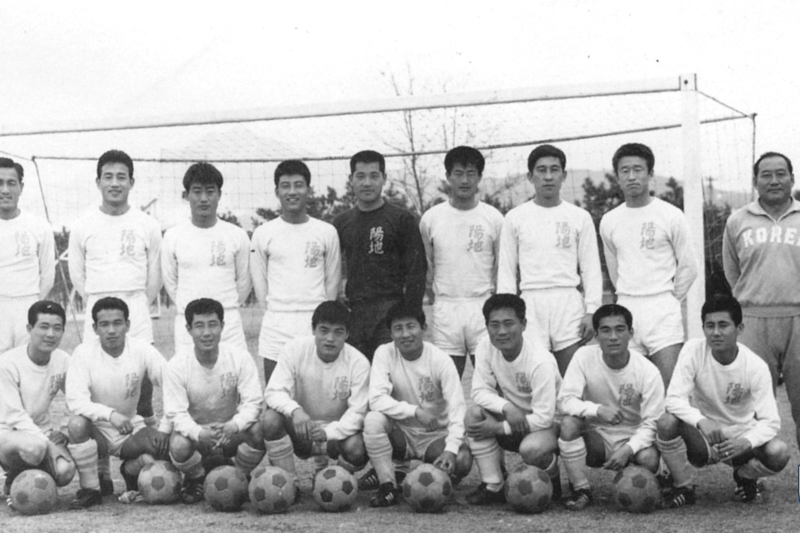
The Yangzee squad of 1967. Jeong is within the second row.

On December 14, 1973, Jeong was chosen by the Korea Business Football Federation as being the year's exemplary player. Jeong would then play for Korea Trust Bank in the 1971 Korean National Semi-Professional Football League where he would be part of the winning squad for the spring season of the year. And would be runners-up in the autumn season. Despite being initially cited as one of the main contributing players towards the clubs newfound success and strong teamwork found within its players, controversy would arise in June 1971 as along with several other domestic Korean players, would be criticized by fans for his poor performance and attitude on field. Regardless, he would continue to play for the club for the 1972 and 1973 season. In the autumn 1973 season, he would be part of the winning squad for Korea Trust Bank and would be awarded the title of All-Star Player by the Federation of Unemployed Footballers. Jeong's final season would occur in both 1974 seasons before he would announce his retirement as a player on November 11, 1974, having played for South Korea for 8 years.

== International career ==
Jeong would make his debut as part of the South Korea U20 team against the Thailand U20 team as part of a friendly. On 26 April 1963, Jeong would play in the 1963 AFC Youth Championship with his only match in the tournament against the South Vietnam U20 team where he would score only South Korean goal in the match as it would end in a draw. Later, Jeong was listed as part of the final South Korean roster for the 1964 Merdeka Tournament as part of the South Korean B team would later return for the 1965 Merdeka Tournament. Jeong would make his debut in the senior team by being part of the official South Korean roster for the 1966 Asian Games but the team would fail to advance beyond the group stage of the tournament. Jeong was also placed on the reserves of South Korea in preparation for subsequent tournament participation.

Jeong would represent his home country during the 1968 International Military Football Championship, scoring the first goal in a 2–0 victory against South Vietnam on April 20, 1968. During the 1968 Merdeka Tournament, Jeong would score against Japan B on August 18 with the match concluding in a 2–0 victory for the Taegeuk Warriors. He then participated in the 1970 FIFA World Cup qualifiers, he scoring two consecutive goals against Japan on October 18, 1969, making it the first time that the senior Korean team would win against Japan in eight years. Later in that year, Jeong would participate in the 1969 King's Cup where he would make an assist against Laos in the first day of the tournament. During the final against defending champions Indonesia, Jeong would score the deciding goal in the 14th minute and would give South Korea their first title in the tournament. Due to his international success, Jeong would be a part of the best XI at the 1969 KFA Awards.

On April 1, 1970, Jeong played a friendly with Brazilian club Flamengo and later in the year, would play in the 1970 Merdeka Tournament where he would score the winning goal against Indonesia. Despite Jeong also scoring against Hong Kong in the 3rd minute of the second half of the match, the referee ruled the goal as being offside and the match would ultimately end in a 0–0 draw. During the final of the tournament, the match would be briefly halted after a Burmese player would injure Jeong and several other Korean players throughout the match. Jeong would be selected to play in the 1970 King's Cup where South Korea would go on to successfully defend their title as champion during the tournament. He would also make the final roster of the South Korean squad for the 1970 Asian Games. He would score again during the semifinals against Japan at the 15th minute. During the final against Burma however, Jeong was unable to play for the majority of the match due to being injured. His successes in 1970 would again find himself being awarded as part of the best XI of 1970.

Jeong would partake in a series of friendlies across Latin America where he would play against several teams such as Mexico, El Salvador, Peru, Bolivia, Brazil, Paraguay, Argentina, and Uruguay from January 5 to March 6 in 16 different matches in preparation for future tournaments of the year. Throughout the tour, the team would experience varying results ranging from a 5–2 victory against Colombia to losing 4–0 against Peru. However, plans had to be postponed and reduced due to the poor conditions the Korean players would endure through as well as Jeong, credited as being the main goal scorer of the team at the time, suffering a leg injury and being unable to play a single match. During the 1971 President's Cup Football Tournament, Jeong would score the first goal against Malaysia in the 15th minute before scoring another goal in the 37th minute, leading to a 5–0 victory for South Korea. He would play in the finals where South Korea and Burma would share the title of champion after neither team could be able to score a goal. During the 1972 Summer Olympics qualifiers, Jeong would score the 3rd goal in the 26th minute in a 8–0 victory against the Republic of China on October 4, 1971. Jeong would also play in the 1971 King's Cup where South Korea would again defend their title as champions of the tournament. Due to South Korea's failure to qualify for the 1972 Munich Summer Olympics, the new Korean managers Park Byung-suk and Ham Heung-chul would replace many older players that had participated in the qualification process with newer and younger players to play for the 1972 AFC Asian Cup and the 1972 King's Cup.

His international career would be further reduced when alongside Kim Jung-nam, would end up being replaced before the 1974 FIFA World Cup qualifiers. This decision would be met with controversy however as the Korean Football Association would be criticized for readily replacing coaches and players whenever the team faced any setback. Despite this though, Jeong would still play in South Korea's first match against Thailand on May 19, 1973. He would also be listed in the final squad for the 1973 Merdeka Tournament. His final international appearance would occur within the match against India during the tournament on July 29, ending in a draw.

== Later career ==
In 1988, following a reconstruction of the Korea Football Association's executive committee, Jeong would be made a director. In 1898, Jeong was working as the deputy general manager at Seoul Trust Bank. Jeong later participated in the 1991 King's Cup as an observer of the talent of other Asian countries that had participated. Jeong would also make an appearance in a televised special by MBC dedicated to South Korean football history after their bid to host the 2002 FIFA World Cup was confirmed.
