= Kang Byung-chan =

South Korean association football player

Personal information
- Date of birth: 1951
- Place of birth: South Korea
- Date of death: 2002 (aged 50–51)
- Place of death: South Korea

Managerial career
- Years: Team
- Korea Housing & Commercial Bank FC
- 2000–2002: Bhutan

Kang Byung-chan (Korean: 강병찬; born 1951 in South Korea; died 2002 in South Korea) was a South Korean football manager who last worked as head coach of the Bhutan national football team. Besides South Korea, he managed in Bhutan. He was a former player.

== Career ==
Byung-chan started his managerial career with Korea Housing & Commercial Bank. In 2000, he was appointed head coach of the Bhutan national football team, a position he held until 2002.
