= Cho Dong-hyun =

South Korean footballer

Personal information
- Date of birth: March 12, 1951 (age 75)
- Place of birth: South Korea

Team information
- Current team: Police FC

Youth career
- 1968–1970: Kyunghee High School
- 1971–1974: Kyung Hee University

Senior career*
Years	Team	Apps	(Gls)
1978–1981	Industrial Bank of Korea		

International career
1971–1976	South Korea		

Managerial career
- 1985–1997: Industrial Bank of Korea FC
- 1998–2005: Ulsan Hyundai Mipo Dolphin FC
- 2005–2009: South Korea U-20
- 2011–2014: Ansan Police FC
- * Club domestic league appearances and goals

- Cho Dong-hyun
- Hangul: 조동현
- Hanja: 曺東鉉
- RR: Jo Donghyeon
- MR: Cho Tonghyŏn

Cho Dong-hyun (Korean: 조동현; born on March 12, 1951) is a former South Korean football player.

He was manager of South Korea U-20 in 2007 FIFA U-20 World Cup and then In 2010, he was appointed manager of Korean Police FC.
