= 1972 AFC Asian Cup final =

Association football match

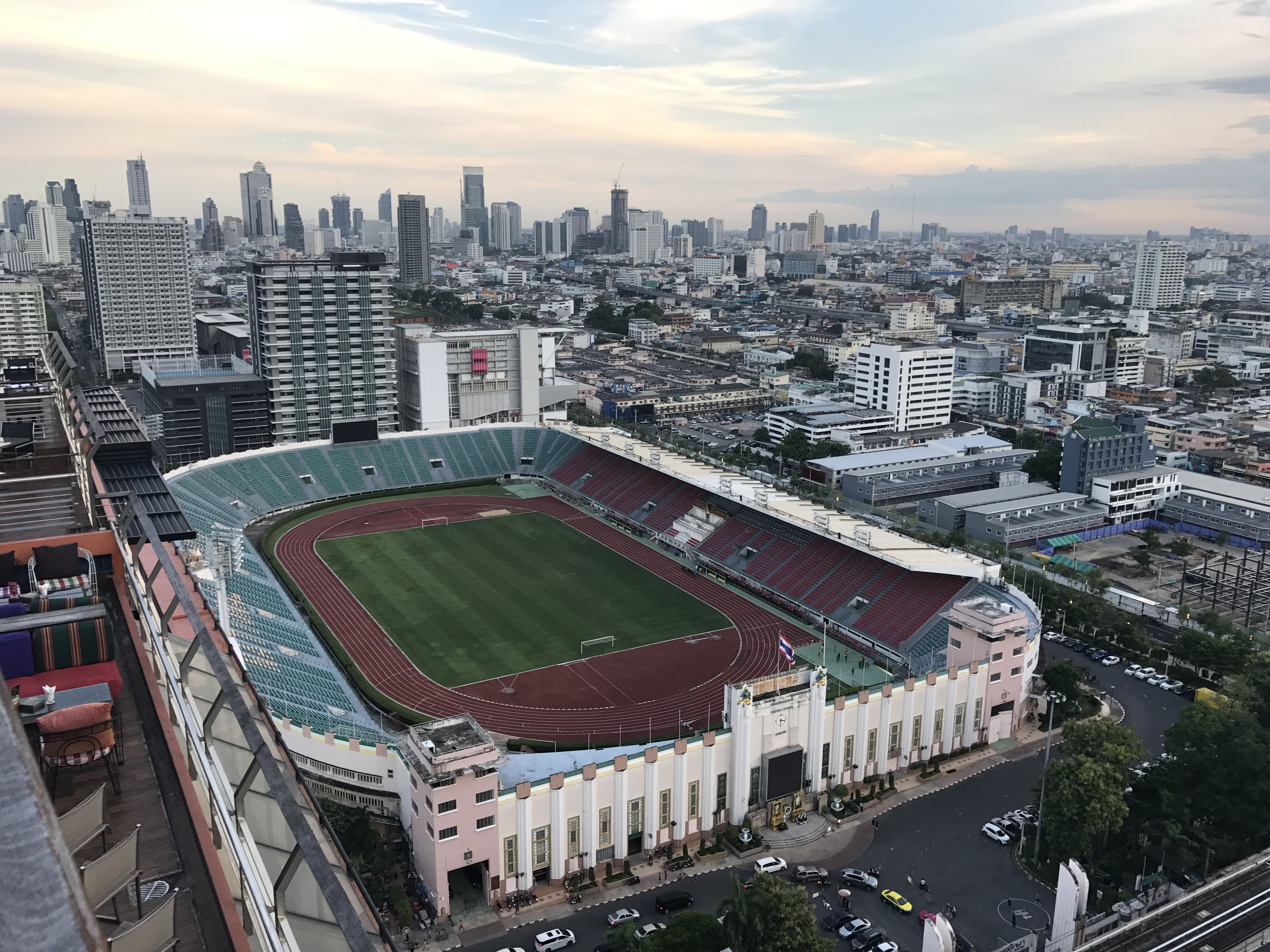
- National Stadium (pictured in 2017) held the final
- Event: 1972 AFC Asian Cup
| Iran | South Korea |
| (Iran) | (South Korea) |
| 2 | 1 |
- After extra time
- Date: 19 May 1972
- Venue: National Stadium, Bangkok
- Referee: Sivapalan Kathiravale (Malaysia)
- Attendance: 15,000

The 1972 AFC Asian Cup final was a football match which determined the winner of the 1972 AFC Asian Cup, the 5th edition of the AFC Asian Cup, a quadrennial tournament contested by the men's national teams of the member associations of the Asian Football Confederation. It was the first time that a final match was held in the AFC Asian Cup since the previous four editions were held in a round-robin format. The match was won by Iran, defeating South Korea 2–1 after extra time to win their second AFC Asian Cup.

== Venue ==
The National Stadium, located in Bangkok, Thailand, hosted the 1972 AFC Asian Cup Final. The 19,793-seat stadium was built in 1937. It was only stadium used to host the 1972 Asian Cup; all matches were played in this stadium.

== Route to the final ==
Iran
Round
South Korea
Opponents
Result
Group allocation matches
Opponents
Result
Khmer Republic
2–0

Iraq
0–0 (a.e.t.) (2–4 pen.)
Opponents
Result
Group stage
Opponents
Result
Iraq
3–0
Match 1
Khmer Republic
4–1
Thailand
3–2
Match 2
Kuwait
1–2
Group A winners

| Pos | Team | Pld | Pts |
|---|---|---|---|
| 1 | Iran | 2 | 4 |
| 2 | Thailand (H) | 2 | 1 |
| 3 | Iraq | 2 | 1 |

Source: RSSSF
(H) Hosts
Final standings
Group B winners

| Pos | Team | Pld | Pts |
|---|---|---|---|
| 1 | South Korea | 2 | 2 |
| 2 | Khmer Republic | 2 | 2 |
| 3 | Kuwait | 2 | 2 |

Source: RSSSF
Opponents
Result
Knockout stage
Opponents
Result
Khmer Republic
2–1
Semi-finals
Thailand
1–1 (a.e.t.) (2–1 pen.)

== Match ==
=== Details ===
19 May 1972

| Iran | 2–1 (a.e.t.) | South Korea |
|---|---|---|
| Jabbari 48'; Kalani 108' | | Park Lee-chun 65' |

National Stadium, Bangkok
Attendance: 15,000
Referee: Sivapalan Kathiravale (Malaysia)
