= Park Su-deok =

South Korean footballer (born 1948

Park Su-deok 박수덕
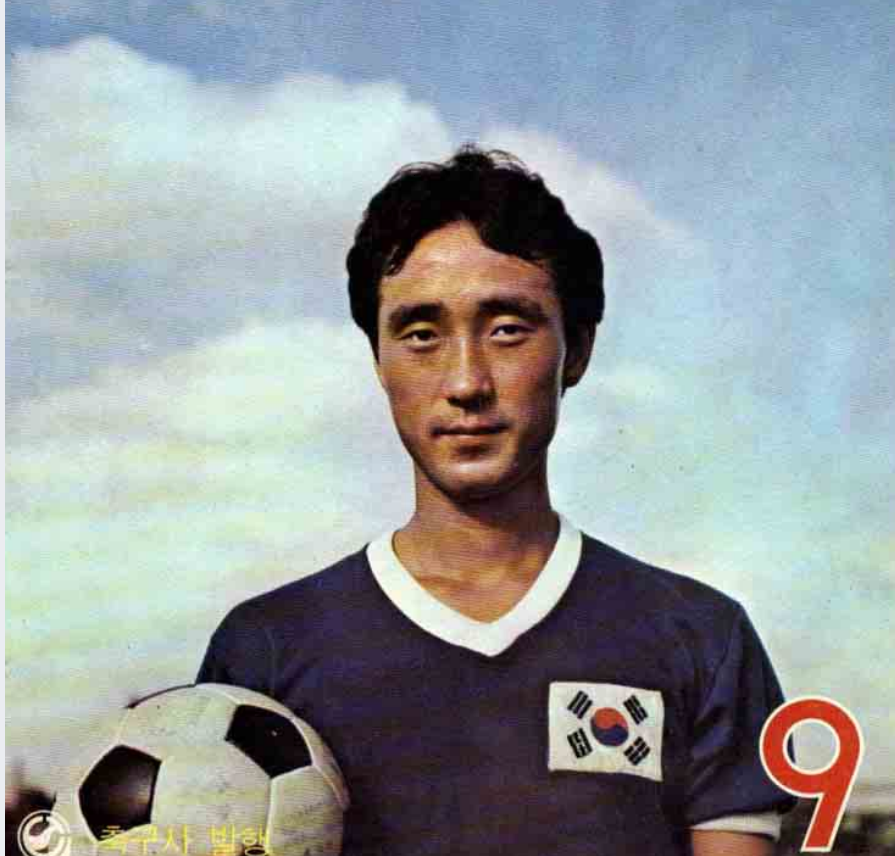
- Park in September 1971

Personal information
- Full name: Park Su-deok
- Date of birth: 7 July 1948 (age 78)
- Place of birth: Daejeon, Korea
- Height: 1.75 m (5 ft 9 in)
- Position: Forward

Youth career
- 1964–1966: Daejeon Commercial High School FC

College career
Years	Team	Apps	(Gls)
1967–1970	Kyung Hee University FC		

Senior career*
Years	Team	Apps	(Gls)
1971–???	Industrial Bank of Korea		
1975–1976	Seiko		

International career
1970–1973	South Korea	34	(18)

Managerial career
- 1976–1983: Hyungseong High School FC
- 1983-1987: Cheonggu High School FC
- 1987-2005: Yeungnam University FC
Medal record
Men's football
Representing South Korea (as player)
Asian Games
Gold medal – first place	1970 Bangkok	Team
AFC Asian Cup
Runner-up	1972 Thailand	Team
- * Club domestic league appearances and goals

Park Su-deok (Korean: 박수덕, born 7 July 1948) is a South Korean former football player and manager. He played as a forward and played in the 1970 Asian Games and the 1972 AFC Asian Cup.

== Club career ==
Born on 7 July 1948, in Daejeon as one of eight children, he began playing football in the first grade of Daejeon Commercial High School FC and enjoyed enough success to be scouted by Kyung Hee University FC in his third year. He displayed a strong scoring sensation and contributed to the team's 1969 Spring Collegiate Football League championship, and later, after graduating from Kyung Hee University, he played for the Industrial Bank of Korea before joining the Republic of Korea Marine Corps, performed military service, and after serving in the Marine Corps, he worked at a small and medium-sized business bank, and at the urging of Byun Ho-young, he played for Seiko SA in Hong Kong for one season with Kang Ki-wook.

== International career ==
Park made his international debut in the group stage of the 1970 King's Cup against Laos, playing for South Korea and scoring multiple goals in that match, followed by two goals against Singapore and the winning goal in the final against Thailand, contributing greatly to the team winning their second title. He then played in the 1970 Asian Games in the same year, helping the team win its first ever gold medal and also played in the 1972 Summer Olympics qualifiers and the 1972 AFC Asian Cup, where he helped the team reach runners-up. His career would abruptly end when in 1973, before the 1974 FIFA World Cup qualifiers, the new manager would base the new squad around forward Kim Jae-han, leaving no room for Park. After witnessing the success of the new roster, Park would retire from international football on his own terms.

== Managerial career ==
After retiring as a player, he began his coaching career in 1976 as the coach of the Hyungseong High School FC, and in 1983, he was appointed as the coach of the Cheonggu High School FC, and the following year, in 1984, he won the President's Cup National High School Football Championship.

After that, he took over as the head coach of Yeungnam University FC in 1987 and began to build a steady career by training the likes of Baek Seung-chul and Shin Tae-yong, being recognized as a capable manager in academy football, rising and falling in the reviews of K-League team managers. In 1995 however, he was arrested for scouting players for money from the head coach of a high school soccer club which ruptured his reputation but would continue to coach at Yeungnam University until 2005 before retiring.
