= Daoyod Dara =

Thai footballer

Personal information
- Full name: Daoyod Dara
- Date of birth: 9 February 1954 (age 72)
- Place of birth: Phitsanulok, Thailand
- Height: 1.72 m (5 ft 7 1/2 in)
- Position: Striker

Senior career*
Years	Team	Apps	(Gls)
19??–19??	Thai Port FC		

International career
1975–1986	Thailand	70	(28)

Managerial career
- 1996–2001: Thai Port
- * Club domestic league appearances and goals as of 29 July 2008

Daoyod Dara (Thai: ดาวยศ ดารา, RTGS: Dao-yot Dara; born February 9, 1954) is a Thai footballer and former Thailand national team player. He has played for national team since 1975-1986.

== Career ==
Dara played for Thailand in qualifying matches for the 1982 FIFA World Cup.

== Personal life ==
He is the son the former South Vietnam national football team player Nguyễn Văn Đức, who fled to Thailand in the 1950s and changed his name to Duan Dara after his naturalization to become a Thai citizen. He is the half-brother of Niwat Srisawat.
