= Hamzah Hussain =

Malaysian footballer

Hamzah Hussain (sometimes spelt as Hamzah Hussein or Hamzah Husin) (born 8 August 1948) is a former football player who represented the Malaysian national football team in the 1970s. He played for Kelantan FA, Pahang FA and Selangor FA in Malaysia Cup competition.

A midfielder, Hamzah played for the Malaysia team in the 1972 Munich Olympics football competition, playing all three group games. He also played for Malaysia in tournaments across Asia such as Merdeka Tournament. He retired from international tournaments in 1974. In 2004, he was inducted in Olympic Council of Malaysia's Hall of Fame for 1972 Summer Olympics football team.

Hamzah was a prison officer at Prison Department of Malaysia, his final rank before retiring from prison force was Deputy Superintendent of Prison.

== Honours ==
Kelantan

- Malaysia Cup runner-up: 1970
- Malaysia FAM Cup runner-up: 1971

Malaysia

- Merdeka Cup: 1973
