= Park Byung-chul =

South Korean footballer and manager

Personal information
- Date of birth: November 25, 1954 (age 71)
- Place of birth: Ulsan, South Korea
- Position: Attacking midfielder

Youth career
- 1970–1974: Hanyang University

Senior career*
Years	Team	Apps	(Gls)
1975–1976	Kookmin Bank	?	(?)
1977–1978	Navy FC (military service)	?	(?)
1979	Gyeongnam Bus	?	(?)
1980–1983	Sea Bee	90	(24)
1983–1984	Bulova SA	30	(8)
1984	Lucky-Goldstar Hwangso	16	(0)

International career
1974–1979	South Korea		
- * Club domestic league appearances and goals

- Park Byung-chul
- Hangul: 박병철
- Hanja: 朴炳澈
- RR: Bak Byeongcheol
- MR: Pak Pyŏngch'ŏl

Park Byung-chul (born November 25, 1954) is a former South Korean footballer and football manager.

He was a member in the South Korea national football team for five years in the 1970s. He played for the Hong Kong side Sea Bee and was a founding member of Lucky-Goldstar Hwangso (Currently FC Seoul).

== International tournaments ==
- 1978 VII Asian games
