= Cho Kwang-rae =

South Korean footballer (born 1954)

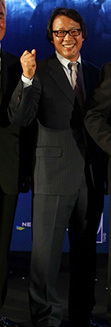
- Cho in 2013

Personal information
- Full name: Cho Kwang-rae
- Date of birth: 19 March 1954 (age 72)
- Place of birth: Jinju, Gyeongnam, South Korea
- Height: 1.71 m (5 ft 7 in)
- Position: Attacking midfielder

Youth career
- 1971–1973: Jinju High School

College career
Years	Team	Apps	(Gls)
1974–1977	Yonsei University		

Senior career*
Years	Team	Apps	(Gls)
1978–1979	POSCO FC		
1980–1981	ROK Army (draft)		
1982–1987	Daewoo Royals	44	(3)

International career
1976	South Korea B		
1977–1986	South Korea	100	(15)

Managerial career
- 1987–1992: Daewoo Royals (assistant)
- 1992: South Korea (assistant)
- 1992–1994: Daewoo Royals
- 1995–1997: Suwon Samsung Bluewings (assistant)
- 1999–2004: Anyang LG Cheetahs
- 2007–2010: Gyeongnam FC
- 2010–2011: South Korea
Medal record
Men's football
Representing South Korea (as player)
FISU World University Championships
Winner	1976 Uruguay
Asian Games
Gold medal – first place	1978 Bangkok
Gold medal – first place	1986 Seoul
AFC Asian Cup
Runner-up	1980 Kuwait
Representing South Korea (as manager)
AFC Asian Cup
Bronze medal – third place	2011 Qatar
- * Club domestic league appearances and goals

- Cho Kwang-rae
- Hangul: 조광래
- Hanja: 趙廣來
- RR: Jo Gwangrae
- MR: Cho Kwangnae

Cho Kwang-rae (Korean: 조광래, born March 19, 1954) is a former South Korean football player and manager. He played as a midfielder for the South Korea national team at the 1986 FIFA World Cup.

== International career ==
Cho was selected for the 1976 World University Football Championship in Uruguay. South Korea advanced to the final after defeating Brazil, Chile and the Netherlands. In the final against Paraguay, he won a crucial penalty and Paraguay forfeited the match after two players who did not accept the judgement were sent off for hitting the referee.

Cho played for the senior national team in the 1986 FIFA World Cup. Cho contributed to South Korea's draw by providing an assist against Bulgaria, but he scored a fatal own goal in the last match that South Korea lost 3–2 to Italy.

In the 1986 Asian Games, Cho consecutively scored team's first goals in the semi-finals and the final. South Korea won a gold medal in the tournament and Cho selected the final match against Saudi Arabia as the best match in his international career.

== Style of play ==
Nicknamed "The Computer" for his tactical acumen, Cho is regarded as one of the greatest South Korean midfielders ever.

== Managerial career ==
Cho began his coaching career in the K League after his retirement, winning the league with the Anyang LG Cheetahs and turning a young Gyeongnam FC side, known as "Cho's Kindergarten", into title contenders.

Cho assumed the South Korean national team head coach position after the 2010 FIFA World Cup and Huh Jung-moo's resignation. He tried to implement a tiki-taka-esque style of play on the Korean squad, which backfired badly. After losing to Lebanon in a 2014 World Cup qualifier, Cho was sacked.

== Career statistics ==
=== International ===
Appearances and goals by national team and year
National team	Year	Apps	Goals
South Korea	1977	20	2
South Korea	1978	15	3
South Korea	1979	5	4
South Korea	1980	16	4
South Korea	1981	11	0
South Korea	1982	10	0
South Korea	1985	13	0
South Korea	1986	10	2
Career total		100	15

Appearances and goals by competition
Competition	Apps	Goals
Friendlies	14	0
Minor competitions	40	7
Asian Games	14	4
AFC Asian Cup qualification	2	0
AFC Asian Cup	5	0
Summer Olympics qualification	6	4
FIFA World Cup qualification	16	0
FIFA World Cup	3	0
Total	100	15

Results list South Korea's goal tally first.

List of international goals scored by Cho Kwang-rae
No.	Date	Venue	Cap	Opponent	Score	Result	Competition
1	22 July 1977	Kuala Lumpur, Malaysia	9	Indonesia	2–0	5–1	1977 Pestabola Merdeka
2	26 July 1977	Kuala Lumpur, Malaysia	10	Burma	3–0	4–0	1977 Pestabola Merdeka
3	12 July 1978	Kuala Lumpur, Malaysia	24	Japan	1–0	4–0	1978 Pestabola Merdeka
4	10 December 1978	Bangkok, Thailand	29	Bahrain	1–0	5–1	1978 Asian Games
5	10 December 1978	Bangkok, Thailand	29	Bahrain	2–0	5–1	1978 Asian Games
6	8 September 1979	Seoul, South Korea	38	Sudan	6–0	8–0	1979 Korea Cup
7	16 September 1979	Incheon, South Korea	40	Bangladesh	4–0	9–0	1979 Korea Cup
8	16 September 1979	Incheon, South Korea	40	Bangladesh	6–0	9–0	1979 Korea Cup
9	16 September 1979	Incheon, South Korea	40	Bangladesh	9–0	9–0	1979 Korea Cup
10	22 March 1980	Kuala Lumpur, Malaysia	44	Japan	2–0	3–1	1980 Summer Olympics qualification
11	22 March 1980	Kuala Lumpur, Malaysia	44	Japan	3–0	3–1	1980 Summer Olympics qualification
12	31 March 1980	Kuala Lumpur, Malaysia	47	Brunei	1–0	3–0	1980 Summer Olympics qualification
13	3 April 1980	Kuala Lumpur, Malaysia	48	Indonesia	1–0	1–0	1980 Summer Olympics qualification
14	3 October 1986	Seoul, South Korea	99	Indonesia	1–0	4–0	1986 Asian Games
15	5 October 1986	Seoul, South Korea	100	Saudi Arabia	1–0	2–0	1986 Asian Games

== Honours ==
=== Player ===
Yonsei University

- Korean National Championship runner-up: 1974

ROK Army

- Korean National Semipro League (Spring): 1980
- Korean President's Cup runner-up: 1980

Daewoo Royals

- K League 1: 1984, 1987
- Korean League Cup runner-up: 1986
- Asian Club Championship: 1985–86

South Korea B

- FISU World University Championships: 1976

South Korea

- Asian Games: 1978, 1986
- AFC Asian Cup runner-up: 1980

Individual

- Korean FA Best XI: 1977, 1978, 1979, 1980, 1981, 1983, 1985, 1986
- Korean FA Most Valuable Player: 1981
- K League 1 Best XI: 1983
- K League '80s All-Star Team: 2003

=== Manager ===
Daewoo Royals B

- Korean National Championship: 1990

Anyang LG Cheetahs

- K League 1: 2000
- Korean League Cup runner-up: 1999
- Korean Super Cup: 2001
- Asian Club Championship runner-up: 2001–02

Gyeongnam FC

- Korean FA Cup runner-up: 2008

South Korea

- AFC Asian Cup third place: 2011

Individual

- Korean National Championship Best Manager: 1990
- K League 1 Manager of the Year: 2000
- K League All-Star: 2004
