= Shin Hyun-ho =

South Korean footballer (born 1953)

Personal information
- Date of birth: 21 September 1953 (age 73)
- Place of birth: South Korea
- Position: Midfielder

Youth career
- 1973–1976: Hanyang University

Senior career*
Years	Team	Apps	(Gls)
1977–1978	POSCO FC		
1979–1980	Chungui		
1981–1982	Hallelujah FC		
1983–1985	Hallelujah FC	36	(2)

International career
1975–1980	South Korea	47	(11)
- * Club domestic league appearances and goals

- Shin Hyun-ho
- Hangul: 신현호
- Hanja: 申鉉浩
- RR: Sin Hyeonho
- MR: Sin Hyŏnho

Shin Hyun-ho (born September 21, 1953) is a Korean football midfielder who played for South Korea in the 1980 Asian Cup. He also played for Hanyang University, Chungui and POSCO FC

== Club career ==
He played for POSCO FC, Chungui and Hallelujah FC.

== International career ==
He was part of the South Korea squad in the 1980 Asian Cup
