= Park Lee-chun =

South Korean footballer and manager

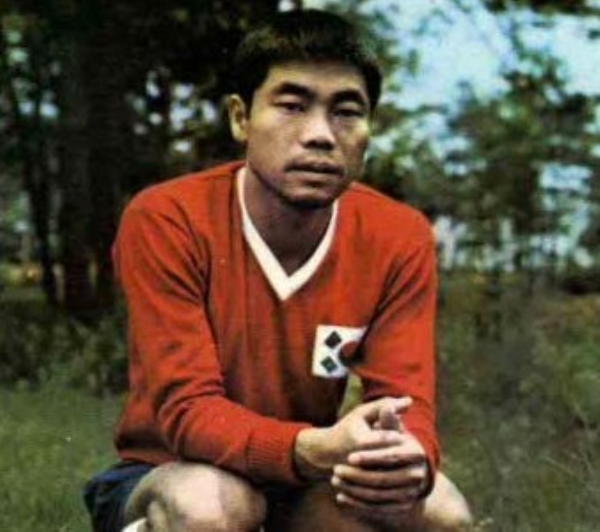
- Park with South Korea

Personal information
- Full name: Park Lee-chun
- Date of birth: 26 July 1947 (age 79)
- Place of birth: Wonsan, Gangwon, Korea
- Height: 1.68 m (5 ft 6 in)
- Position: Forward

College career
Years	Team	Apps	(Gls)
1967–1971	Chung-Ang University		

Senior career*
Years	Team	Apps	(Gls)
1968–1970	Yangzee		
1970–1971	ROK Army (draft)		
1972–1976	Kookmin Bank		
1976–1978	Sea Bee		
1978	South China		
1978–1980	Sea Bee		

International career
1967	South Korea U20		
1969–1974	South Korea	89	(36)

Managerial career
- 1996–1997: South Korea U20
- 2007: Incheon United (caretaker)
Medal record
Representing South Korea
Men's football
Asian Games
Gold medal – first place	1970 Bangkok	Team
AFC Asian Cup
Silver medal – second place	1972 Thailand	Team
- * Club domestic league appearances and goals

- Park Lee-chun
- Hangul: 박이천
- Hanja: 朴利天
- RR: Bak Icheon
- MR: Pak Ich'ŏn

Park Lee-chun (born July 26, 1947) is a former South Korean football player and manager. He played for the South Korea national football team from 1969 to 1974. In the 1972 AFC Asian Cup, he scored four goals and led South Korea to become runners-up. After retirement, he managed South Korean under-20 team in the 1997 FIFA World Youth Championship.

== Honours ==
Yangzee

- Korean National Championship: 1968
- Korean President's Cup: 1968
- Asian Champion Club Tournament runner-up: 1969

ROK Army

- Korean National Championship: 1970
- Korean President's Cup: 1971

Kookmin Bank

- Korean President's Cup: 1973

South Korea

- Asian Games: 1970
- AFC Asian Cup runner-up: 1972

Individual

- Korean FA Best XI: 1970, 1971, 1972, 1973, 1974
- Korean FA Most Valuable Player: 1972
- KASA Best Korean Footballer: 1972
