= South Korea national football team results =

This article shows the match statistics of the South Korea national football team.

== Results by year ==
=== 1950s ===
Year	Pld	W	D	L	Win %
1948	2	1	0	1	50.00
1949	2	1	1	0	50.00
1950	3	2	0	1	66.67
1951	Did not play				
1952	Did not play				
1953	5	3	1	1	60.00
1954	8	2	3	3	25.00
1955	Did not play				
1956	10	8	1	1	80.00
1957	Did not play				
1958	7	4	1	2	57.14
1959	11	7	2	2	63.64
Total	48	28	9	11	58.33

=== 1960s ===
Year	Pld	W	D	L	Win %
1960	11	7	3	1	63.64
1961	6	2	1	3	33.33
1962	7	6	0	1	85.71
1963	9	4	2	3	44.44
1964	9	4	1	4	44.44
1965	6	3	2	1	50.00
1966	7	3	0	4	42.86
1967	20	14	3	3	70.00
1968	6	4	0	2	66.67
1969	9	5	3	1	55.56
Total	90	52	15	23	57.78

=== 1970s ===
Year	Pld	W	D	L	Win %
1970	19	12	6	1	63.16
1971	17	9	5	3	52.94
1972	24	12	7	5	50.00
1973	17	10	5	2	58.82
1974	14	6	3	5	42.86
1975	23	18	1	4	78.26
1976	20	11	6	3	55.00
1977	26	16	9	1	61.54
1978	20	18	2	0	90.00
1979	6	5	0	1	83.33
Total	186	117	44	25	62.90

=== 1980s ===
Year	Pld	W	D	L	Win %
1980	17	12	2	3	70.59
1981	12	7	2	3	58.33
1982	13	5	5	3	38.46
1983	15	8	5	2	53.33
1984	16	7	4	5	43.75
1985	15	11	0	4	73.33
1986	10	4	3	3	40.00
1987	5	3	2	0	60.00
1988	10	7	3	0	70.00
1989	16	11	3	2	68.75
Total	129	75	29	25	58.14

=== 1990s ===
Year	Pld	W	D	L	Win %
1990	21	12	3	6	57.14
1991	6	3	3	0	50.00
1992	5	1	4	0	20.00
1993	21	11	6	4	52.38
1994	20	7	6	7	35.00
1995	9	2	4	3	22.22
1996	16	8	3	5	50.00
1997	23	15	5	3	65.22
1998	25	10	8	7	40.00
1999	5	1	3	1	20.00
Total	151	70	45	36	46.36

=== 2000s ===
Year	Pld	W	D	L	Win %
2000	22	12	8	2	54.55
2001	16	8	4	4	50.00
2002	22	6	8	8	27.27
2003	15	7	2	6	46.67
2004	17	10	5	2	58.82
2005	17	6	6	5	35.29
2006	22	9	6	7	40.91
2007	11	4	4	3	36.36
2008	16	8	7	1	50.00
2009	13	6	6	1	46.15
Total	171	76	56	39	44.44

=== 2010s ===
Year	Pld	W	D	L	Win %
2010	19	10	2	7	52.63
2011	16	10	4	2	62.50
2012	9	5	1	3	55.56
2013	15	5	4	6	33.33
2014	15	5	1	9	33.33
2015	19	15	3	1	78.95
2016	11	8	1	2	72.73
2017	13	4	5	4	30.77
2018	19	7	6	6	36.84
2019	18	12	4	2	66.67
Total	154	81	31	42	52.60

=== 2020s ===
Year	Pld	W	D	L	Win %
2020	2	1	0	1	50.00
2021	10	7	2	1	70.00
2022	20	12	3	5	60.00
2023	10	5	3	2	50.00
2024	17	10	6	1	58.82
2025	13	8	3	2	61.54
Total	72	43	17	12	59.72

== Largest margins ==
=== Biggest victories ===
As of 1 July 2022

Rank	Date	Opponent	Score	Competition
1	29 September 2003	Nepal	16–0	2004 AFC Asian Cup qualification
2	1 October 1994	Nepal	11–0	1994 Asian Games
3	16 September 1979	Bangladesh	9–0	1979 Korea Cup
3	25 May 1989	Nepal	9–0	1990 FIFA World Cup qualification
3	5 August 1996	Guam	9–0	1996 AFC Asian Cup qualification
3	5 April 2000	Laos	9–0	2000 AFC Asian Cup qualification
7	4 October 1971	Republic of China	8–0	1972 Summer Olympics qualification
7	10 August 1976	India	8–0	1976 Pestabola Merdeka
7	8 September 1979	Sudan	8–0	1979 Korea Cup
7	27 March 1980	Philippines	8–0	1980 Summer Olympics qualification
7	6 September 2006	Chinese Taipei	8–0	2007 AFC Asian Cup qualification
7	3 September 2015	Laos	8–0	2018 FIFA World Cup qualification
7	10 October 2019	Sri Lanka	8–0	2022 FIFA World Cup qualification

=== Heaviest defeats ===
As of 10 October 2025

Rank	Date	Opponent	Score	Competition
1	5 August 1948	Sweden	0–12	1948 Summer Olympics
2	16 October 1964	United Arab Republic	0–10	1964 Summer Olympics
3	17 June 1954	Hungary	0–9	1954 FIFA World Cup
4	20 June 1954	Turkey	0–7	1954 FIFA World Cup
5	12 October 1964	Czechoslovakia	1–6	1964 Summer Olympics
5	1 June 2016	Spain	1–6	Friendly
5	20 June 1998	Netherlands	0–5	1998 FIFA World Cup
5	30 May 2001	France	0–5	2001 FIFA Confederations Cup
5	15 August 2001	Czech Republic	0–5	Friendly
5	10 October 2025	Brazil	0–5	Friendly

== See also ==
- South Korea national football team
- South Korea national football team records and statistics
