= 1970 King's Cup =

Tournament details
- Host country: Thailand
- Dates: 9–20 November
- Teams: 9 (from 1 confederation)
- Venue: 1 (in 1 host city)

Final positions
- Champions: South Korea (2nd title)
- Runners-up: Thailand
- Third place: Malaysia
- Fourth place: Indonesia

Tournament statistics
- Matches played: 20
- Goals scored: 64 (3.2 per match)

The 1970 King's Cup (Thai: คิงส์คัพ 1970) was the third invitational international association football championship organised by the Football Association of Thailand. Staged in Bangkok, the competition ran from 8 to 20 November 1970 and was contested by the national teams of Hong Kong, Indonesia, Khmer Republic, Laos, Malaysia, Singapore, South Korea, South Vietnam and Thailand.

After two rounds of play, defending champions South Korea and hosts Thailand contested the final. In a tightly contested match, South Korea narrowly edged out Thailand 1–0 to win the competition. In the third-place play-off, Malaysia defeated Indonesia 1–0.

== Background ==
The King's Cup was founded in 1968 and was inspired by the success of the Merdeka Tournament – an annual invitational international association football championship founded in 1957 and held to celebrate Independence Day in Malaysia. South Korea were the defending champions after defeating Indonesia 1–0 in the final of the previous edition in 1969. Indonesia and South Korea were both the most successful teams in the competition, having won the title once each in the first two editions.

== Format ==
In total, nine teams took part in the competition. They were drawn into two single round robin groups – one of four teams and one of five teams. The group winners and runners-up would then contest the semi-finals which would determine the teams contesting the final and the third-place play-off.

=== Participants ===
- Hong Kong
- Indonesia
- Khmer Republic
- Laos
- Malaysia
- Singapore
- South Korea
- South Vietnam
- Thailand

== Group stage ==
=== Group A ===
South Korea and Thailand advanced to the semi-finals.

==== Table ====
Pos	Team	Pld	W	D	L	GF	GA	GAv	Pts	Qualification
1	South Korea	4	3	1	0	11	0	—	7	Advance to semi-finals
2	Thailand	4	3	1	0	6	2	3.000	7	Advance to semi-finals
3	Hong Kong	4	1	0	3	5	8	0.625	2	
4	Laos	4	1	0	3	5	9	0.556	2	
5	Singapore	4	1	0	3	2	10	0.200	2	

==== Matches ====
8 November 1970

Laos	0–1	Thailand

8 November 1970

Hong Kong	0–1	Singapore

10 November 1970

Singapore	1–3	Thailand

10 November 1970

South Korea	3–0	Hong Kong

12 November 1970

South Korea	4–0	Laos

12 November 1970

Hong Kong	1–2	Thailand

14 November 1970

Laos	3–0	Singapore

14 November 1970

South Korea	0–0	Thailand

16 November 1970

South Korea	4–0	Singapore

16 November 1970

Hong Kong	4–2	Laos

=== Group B ===
Indonesia and Malaysia advanced to the semi-finals.

==== Table ====
Pos	Team	Pld	W	D	L	GF	GA	GAv	Pts	Qualification
1	Indonesia	3	3	0	0	12	4	3.000	6	Advance to semi-finals
2	Malaysia	3	1	1	1	3	5	0.600	3	Advance to semi-finals
3	Khmer Republic	3	0	2	1	4	7	0.571	2	
4	South Vietnam	3	0	1	2	6	9	0.667	1	

==== Matches ====
9 November 1970

Khmer Republic	1–1	Malaysia

9 November 1970

Indonesia	5–3	South Vietnam

13 November 1970

Indonesia	3–0	Malaysia

13 November 1970

Khmer Republic	2–2	South Vietnam

15 November 1970

Malaysia	2–1	South Vietnam

15 November 1970

Khmer Republic	2–4	Indonesia

== Semi-finals ==
South Korea defeated Malaysia and Thailand defeated Indonesia to advance to the final.

18 November 1970

South Korea	2–0	Malaysia

18 November 1970

Indonesia	1–2	Thailand

== Third-place play-off ==
Malaysia defeated Indonesia to finish third.

20 November 1970

Malaysia	3–1	Indonesia

== Final ==
South Korea defeated Thailand to win the competition.

20 November 1970

Thailand	0–1	South Korea
