= Dongdaemun Stadium =

Sports complex in Seoul (1925–2008)

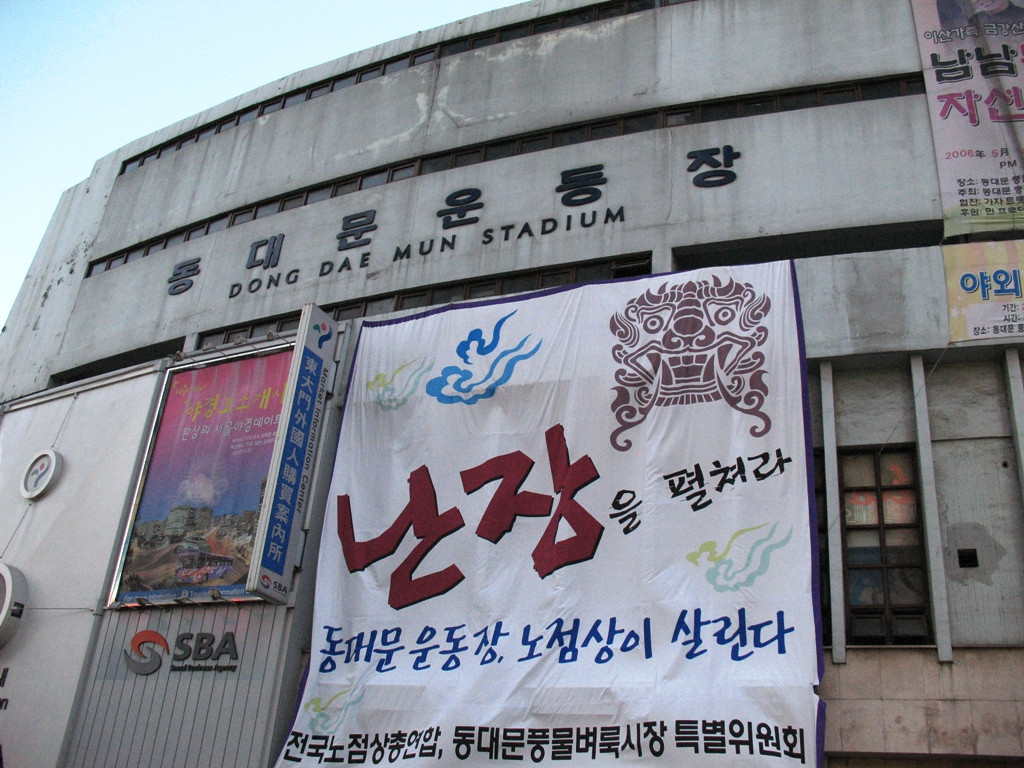
- Interactive map of Dongdaemun Stadium
- Former names: Gyeongseong Stadium; Seoul Stadium
- Location: Euljiro 7(chil)-ga, Jung-gu, Seoul, Korea
- Coordinates: 37.56758°N 127.010595°E
- Capacity: 22,706

Construction
- Groundbreaking: 24 May 1925
- Opened: 15 October 1925
- Expanded: 1962, 1966, 1968
- Closed: 2003
- Demolished: 2008

Tenants
- Ilhwa Chunma (1989–1995); LG Cheetahs (1990–1995); Yukong Elephants (1991–1995)

Korean name
- Hangul: 동대문운동장
- Hanja: 東大門運動場
- RR: Dongdaemun undongjang
- MR: Tongdaemun undongjang

Dongdaemun Stadium (Korean: 동대문운동장) was a sports complex in Seoul, South Korea, with a multi-purpose stadium, a baseball park and other sports facilities. It was located near Dongdaemun or Great East Gate. The surrounding Dongdaemun market had many vendors selling athletics-related goods. It was demolished in 2008 to make way for the Dongdaemun Design Plaza & Park.

== History ==
Construction on the main athletics stadium and baseball field began on 24 May 1925 and was opened for use on 15 October 1925 as Keijō Stadium. The venue was the main center for sports events in the city, and along with Kirim Stadium in Pyongyang, it was one of the two venues used in the Gyeongsung-Pyongyang inter-city soccer tournament in the 1930s.

The stadium was the location for mass celebrations of the end of Japanese colonial rule, as almost 250,000 citizens gathered at the venue on 15 August 1945, to celebrate the liberation of the peninsula.

Additional construction was undertaken in 1962 to modernize the two existing venues as well as to create a swimming pool, volleyball courts and soft clay tennis courts. Floodlights were added to the baseball venue in 1966 and to the athletics venue in 1968 to allow for nighttime sporting events.

Before its demolition, the athletics stadium was used as a flea market where all types of new and second-hand goods were sold. It formed part of the massive Dongdaemun shopping district, which had been active for 57 years.

== Facilities ==
=== Football ===
The main multi-purpose stadium remained the main center for sports events in Seoul until the Seoul Sports Complex was built for the 1988 Olympic Games. It was the home venue for the South Korea national football team from the 1950s to the late 1980s, though it continued to be used into the 1990s until the last international match was played there, against Myanmar in 2000.

The 30,000-seat main stadium also hosted some football matches including the quarter-finals at the 1988 Summer Olympics and many matches of the Korea Cup, an international football competition.

The inaugural match of the K League, the first professional football league in South Korea, was held at the athletics venue on 8 May 1983. Ilhwa Chunma (currently Seongnam FC), LG Cheetahs (currently FC Seoul), and Yukong Elephants (currently Jeju United FC) were based at the stadium until 1995, but with the decentralization policy in K League, they relocated away to their current stadiums in 1996.

=== Others ===
The inaugural match of the Korean baseball league was held at Dongdaemun Baseball Stadium in 1982.

== See also ==
- Seoul World Cup Stadium
- Jamsil Olympic Stadium
- Mokdong Stadium
- Hyochang Stadium
