= List of South Korean football champions =

The South Korean football champions are the winners of the highest league in South Korean football. Jeonbuk Hyundai Motors have won ten titles, the record for most titles won.

== History ==
Before a professional football league was founded in South Korea, there was a semi-professional league held twice a year. South Korean companies, banks and militaries' football clubs qualified for the National Semi-professional League, but university clubs could not participate at it unlike at the National Football Championship. Instead, they could enter the National University League.

The K League was founded as a professional league with the name of "Super League" in 1983. It was contested between both professional and semi-professional clubs until 1986, and started to accept only professional clubs in 1987. It was renamed as "Football Festival" in 1986, "Korean Professional Football League" in 1987, "Korean League" in 1994, "Professional Football League" in 1996, and current name "K League" in 1998.

The K League was split into two divisions in 2013. The first division was originally named "K League Classic" before being renamed "K League 1" in 2018.

== Champions by season ==
Season	Competition	Champions	Runners-up
1964	Spring National Semipro League	Keumsung Textile (1); Cheil Industries (1)	—
1964	Autumn National Semipro League	Keumsung Textile (2)	Korea Tungsten
1965	Spring National Semipro League	Keumsung Textile (3); Korea Tungsten (1); Korea Electric Power (1)	—
1965	Autumn National Semipro League	Korea Tungsten (2)	Korea Coal Corporation
1966	Spring National Semipro League	Seoul Police Department (1)	Korea Electric Power
1966	Autumn National Semipro League	Korea Tungsten (3); Seoul Police Department (2)	—
1967	Spring National Semipro League	National Police Department (3)	Ssangyong Cement
1967	Autumn National Semipro League	Korea Electric Power (2)	Cheil Industries
1968	Spring National Semipro League	Korea Tungsten (4)	Korea Electric Power
1968	Autumn National Semipro League	Cheil Industries (2); ROK Army Quartermaster Corps (1)	—
1969	Spring National Semipro League	Korea Electric Power (3)	Korea Tungsten
1969	Autumn National Semipro League	Unknown (Note: There is an article about the second round of Autumn season, but no record after that. It might be stopped because of many international football matches.)	
1970	Spring National Semipro League	Cheil Industries (3)	Korea Tungsten
1970	Autumn National Semipro League	Chohung Bank (1)	Korea Trust Bank
1971	Spring National Semipro League	Korea Trust Bank (1)	Korea Exchange Bank; Korea Housing Bank
1971	Autumn National Semipro League	ROK Marine Corps (1)	Korea Trust Bank; Chohung Bank
1972	Spring National Semipro League	Korea Housing Bank (1)	ROK Marine Corps
1972	Autumn National Semipro League	Korea Housing Bank (2)	ROK Marine Corps
1973	Spring National Semipro League	ROK Marine Corps (2)	Kookmin Bank
1973	Autumn National Semipro League	Korea Trust Bank (2)	ROK Army
1974	Spring National Semipro League	Chohung Bank (2)	ROK Army
1974	Autumn National Semipro League	Commercial Bank of Korea (1); ROK Army (1)	—
1975	Spring National Semipro League	POSCO FC (1)	ROK Army
1975	Autumn National Semipro League	Industrial Bank of Korea (1)	Korea Automobile Insurance
1976	Spring National Semipro League	Korea Exchange Bank (1); Korea Trust Bank (3)	—
1977	National Semipro League	ROK Army (2)	POSCO FC
1978	Spring National Semipro League	Seoul City (1); ROK Navy (3)	—
1978	Autumn National Semipro League	Korea Automobile Insurance (1)	Seoul City
1979	Spring National Semipro League	Industrial Bank of Korea (2)	ROK Army
1980	Spring National Semipro League	Seoul City (2); ROK Army (3)	—
1980	Autumn National Semipro League	Korea Automobile Insurance (2); ROK Air Force (1)	—
1981	Spring National Semipro League	Daewoo FC (1)	ROK Navy
1981	Autumn National Semipro League	POSCO FC (2)	ROK Army
1982	National Semipro League (Korean League)	POSCO FC (3)	Kookmin Bank
1983	K League (Super League)	Hallelujah FC (1)	Daewoo Royals
1984	K League (Super League)	Daewoo Royals (2)	Yukong Elephants
1985	K League (Super League)	Lucky-Goldstar Hwangso (1)	POSCO Atoms
1986	K League (Football Festival)	POSCO Atoms (4)	Lucky-Goldstar Hwangso
1987	K League (Korean Professional Football)	Daewoo Royals (3)	POSCO Atoms
1988	K League (Korean Professional Football)	POSCO Atoms (5)	Hyundai Horang-i
1989	K League (Korean Professional Football)	Yukong Elephants (1)	Lucky-Goldstar Hwangso
1990	K League (Korean Professional Football)	Lucky-Goldstar Hwangso (2)	Daewoo Royals
1991	K League (Korean Professional Football)	Daewoo Royals (4)	Hyundai Horang-i
1992	K League (Korean Professional Football)	POSCO Atoms (6)	Ilhwa Chunma
1993	K League (Korean Professional Football)	Ilhwa Chunma (1)	LG Cheetahs
1994	K League (Korean League)	Ilhwa Chunma (2)	Yukong Elephants
1995	K League (Korean League)	Ilhwa Chunma (3)	Pohang Atoms
1996	K League (Professional Football)	Ulsan Hyundai Horang-i (1)	Suwon Samsung Bluewings
1997	K League (Professional Football)	Busan Daewoo Royals (5)	Jeonnam Dragons
1998	K League	Suwon Samsung Bluewings (1)	Ulsan Hyundai Horang-i
1999	K League	Suwon Samsung Bluewings (2)	Busan Daewoo Royals
2000	K League	Anyang LG Cheetahs (3)	Bucheon SK
2001	K League	Seongnam Ilhwa Chunma (4)	Anyang LG Cheetahs
2002	K League	Seongnam Ilhwa Chunma (5)	Ulsan Hyundai Horang-i
2003	K League	Seongnam Ilhwa Chunma (6)	Ulsan Hyundai Horang-i
2004	K League	Suwon Samsung Bluewings (3)	Pohang Steelers
2005	K League	Ulsan Hyundai Horang-i (2)	Incheon United
2006	K League	Seongnam Ilhwa Chunma (7)	Suwon Samsung Bluewings
2007	K League	Pohang Steelers (7)	Seongnam Ilhwa Chunma
2008	K League	Suwon Samsung Bluewings (4)	FC Seoul
2009	K League	Jeonbuk Hyundai Motors (1)	Seongnam Ilhwa Chunma
2010	K League	FC Seoul (4)	Jeju United
2011	K League	Jeonbuk Hyundai Motors (2)	Ulsan Hyundai
2012	K League	FC Seoul (5)	Jeonbuk Hyundai Motors
2013	K League 1 (K League Classic)	Pohang Steelers (8)	Ulsan Hyundai
2014	K League 1 (K League Classic)	Jeonbuk Hyundai Motors (3)	Suwon Samsung Bluewings
2015	K League 1 (K League Classic)	Jeonbuk Hyundai Motors (4)	Suwon Samsung Bluewings
2016	K League 1 (K League Classic)	FC Seoul (6)	Jeonbuk Hyundai Motors
2017	K League 1 (K League Classic)	Jeonbuk Hyundai Motors (5)	Jeju United
2018	K League 1	Jeonbuk Hyundai Motors (6)	Gyeongnam FC
2019	K League 1	Jeonbuk Hyundai Motors (7)	Ulsan Hyundai
2020	K League 1	Jeonbuk Hyundai Motors (8)	Ulsan Hyundai
2021	K League 1	Jeonbuk Hyundai Motors (9)	Ulsan Hyundai
2022	K League 1	Ulsan Hyundai (3)	Jeonbuk Hyundai Motors
2023	K League 1	Ulsan Hyundai (4)	Pohang Steelers
2024	K League 1	Ulsan HD (5)	Gangwon FC
2025	K League 1	Jeonbuk Hyundai Motors (10)	Daejeon Hana Citizen
2026	K League 1	FC Seoul (7)	

== Statistics ==
=== All-time (since 1964) ===
==== Titles by club ====
In South Korea, professional era records are generally accepted.

Club	Champions	Runners-up	Seasons won
Jeonbuk Hyundai Motors	10	3	2009, 2011, 2014, 2015, 2017, 2018, 2019, 2020, 2021, 2025
Pohang Steelers	8	6	1975, 1981, 1982, 1986, 1988, 1992, 2007, 2013
FC Seoul	7	5	1985, 1990, 2000, 2010, 2012, 2016, 2026
Seongnam FC	7	3	1993, 1994, 1995, 2001, 2002, 2003, 2006
Ulsan HD	5	10	1996, 2005, 2022, 2023, 2024
Busan Daewoo Royals	5	3	1981, 1984, 1987, 1991, 1997
Suwon Samsung Bluewings	4	4	1998, 1999, 2004, 2008
Korea Tungsten	4	3	1965 (2), 1966, 1968
ROK Army	3	5	1974, 1977, 1980
ROK Navy	3	3	1971, 1973, 1978
Korea Electric Power	3	2	1965, 1967, 1969
Korea Trust Bank	3	2	1971, 1973, 1976
Cheil Industries	3	1	1964, 1968, 1970
Keumsung Textile	3	0	1964 (2), 1965
National Police Department	3	0	1966 (2), 1967
Korea Housing Bank	2	1	1972 (2)
Chohung Bank	2	1	1970, 1974
Seoul City	2	1	1978, 1980
Korea Automobile Insurance	2	1	1978, 1980
Industrial Bank of Korea	2	0	1975, 1979
Jeju United	1	5	1989
Korea Exchange Bank	1	1	1976
ROK Army Quartermaster Corps	1	0	1968
Commercial Bank of Korea	1	0	1974
ROK Air Force	1	0	1980
Hallelujah FC	1	0	1983

=== Professional era (since 1983) ===
==== Titles by club ====
In accordance with the official K League policy, the current clubs inherit the history and records of the predecessor clubs.

Club	Champions	Runners-up	Seasons won
Jeonbuk Hyundai Motors	10	3	2009, 2011, 2014, 2015, 2017, 2018, 2019, 2020, 2021, 2025
FC Seoul	7	5	1985, 1990, 2000, 2010, 2012, 2016, 2026
Seongnam Ilhwa Chunma	7	3	1993, 1994, 1995, 2001, 2002, 2003, 2006
Ulsan HD	5	10	1996, 2005, 2022, 2023, 2024
Pohang Steelers	5	5	1986, 1988, 1992, 2007, 2013
Suwon Samsung Bluewings	4	4	1998, 1999, 2004, 2008
Busan Daewoo Royals	4	3	1984, 1987, 1991, 1997
Jeju United	1	5	1989
Hallelujah FC	1	0	1983

==== Titles by city/province ====
In the early years, K League clubs were assigned hometowns, but these were purely nominal because teams travelled together to play matches at various stadiums. The current home-and-away system has been in use since the 1987 season.

City/Province	Titles	Club	Titles	Seasons won
Jeonbuk	10	Jeonbuk Hyundai Motors	10	2009, 2011, 2014, 2015, 2017, 2018, 2019, 2020, 2021, 2025
Seoul	8	Lucky-Goldstar Hwangso	1	1990
Seoul	8	FC Seoul	4	2010, 2012, 2016, 2026
Seoul	8	Ilhwa Chunma	3	1993, 1994, 1995
Ulsan	5	Ulsan Hyundai Horang-i	2	1996, 2005
Ulsan	5	Ulsan Hyundai	2	2022, 2023
Ulsan	5	Ulsan HD	1	2024
Pohang	4	POSCO Atoms	2	1988, 1992
Pohang	4	Pohang Steelers	2	2007, 2013
Suwon	4	Suwon Samsung Bluewings	4	1998, 1999, 2004, 2008
Seongnam	4	Seongnam Ilhwa Chunma	4	2001, 2002, 2003, 2006
Busan	2	Daewoo Royals	1	1991
Busan	2	Busan Daewoo Royals	1	1997
Busan–Gyeongnam	1	Daewoo Royals	1	1987
Incheon–Gyeonggi	1	Yukong Elephants	1	1989
Anyang	1	Anyang LG Cheetahs	1	2000

==== Titles by region ====
In the early years, K League clubs were assigned hometowns, but these were purely nominal because teams travelled together to play matches at various stadiums. The current home-and-away system has been in use since the 1987 season.

Region	Titles	City/Province	Titles
Gyeonggi region (Seoul metropolitan area)	18	Seoul	8
Gyeonggi region (Seoul metropolitan area)	18	Seongnam	4
Gyeonggi region (Seoul metropolitan area)	18	Suwon	4
Gyeonggi region (Seoul metropolitan area)	18	Anyang	1
Gyeonggi region (Seoul metropolitan area)	18	Incheon–Gyeonggi	1
Yeongnam region (Gyeongsang)	12	Ulsan	5
Yeongnam region (Gyeongsang)	12	Pohang	4
Yeongnam region (Gyeongsang)	12	Busan	2
Yeongnam region (Gyeongsang)	12	Busan–Gyeongnam	1
Honam region (Jeolla)	10	Jeonbuk	10

== See also ==
- Football in South Korea
- South Korean football league system
- List of Korea Cup winners
