= 1983 Daewoo Royals season =

Daewoo
1983 season
- Manager: Jang Woon-Soo
- KSL: Runner-up
- Top goalscorer: League: Lee Chun-Seok (8); All: Lee Chun-Seok (8)

The 1983 season was Daewoo's first ever season in the Korean Super League in South Korea. Daewoo competed in League.

== Players ==
=== Squad ===
Note: Flags indicate national team as defined under FIFA eligibility rules; some limited exceptions apply. Players may hold more than one non-FIFA nationality.

No.	Pos.	Nation	Player
1	GK	KOR	Kim Poong-Joo
2	GK	KOR	Jeong Seong-Gyo
3	MF	KOR	Cho Kwang-Rae
4	DF	KOR	Chang Woe-Ryong
5	FW	KOR	Lee Chun-Seok
6	DF	KOR	Kim Tae-Su
7	DF	KOR	Kim Min-Hye
8	FW	KOR	Kang Shin-Woo
9	FW	KOR	Min Jin-Hong
10	MF	KOR	Lee Tae-Ho
11	FW	KOR	Chung Hae-Won
12	DF	KOR	Kim Hee-Tae
13	MF	KOR	Hyun Ki-Ho

No.	Pos.	Nation	Player
16	DF	KOR	Lee Jae-Hee
17	FW	KOR	Byun Byung-Joo
18	MF	KOR	Lee Cheon-Heung
19	FW	KOR	Park Jong-Won
20	DF	KOR	Ko Eui-Seok
21	MF	KOR	Yoo Jong-Wan
22	DF	KOR	Yoo Tae-Mok
—	FW	KOR	Im Go-Seok
—	FW	KOR	Min Byung-Wook
—	DF	KOR	Park Bok-Jun
—	FW	KOR	Lee Yong-Seol
—	DF	KOR	Shin Jae-Heum
—	MF	KOR	Kang Young-Cheol

=== Squad stats ===
No.	Nat.	Pos.	Name	Korean Name	League		Total	
No.	Nat.	Pos.	Name	Korean Name	Apps	Goals	Apps	Goals
1	(South Korea)	GK	Kim Poong-Joo	김풍주	1 (0)	0	1	0
2	(South Korea)	GK	Jeong Seong-Gyo	정성교	15 (0)	0	15	0
3	(South Korea)	MF	Cho Kwang-Rae	조광래	15 (0)	2	15	2
4	(South Korea)	DF	Chang Woe-Ryong	장외룡	15 (0)	0	15	0
5	(South Korea)	FW	Lee Chun-Seok	이춘석	16 (0)	8	16	8
6	(South Korea)	DF	Kim Tae-Su	김태수	8 (4)	0	12	0
7	(South Korea)	DF	Kim Min-Hye	김민혜	8 (1)	0	9	0
8	(South Korea)	FW	Kang Shin-Woo	강신우	15 (1)	0	16	0
9	(South Korea)	FW	Min Jin-Hong	민진홍	1 (1)	0	2	0
10	(South Korea)	MF	Lee Tae-Ho	이태호	8 (0)	3	8	3
11	(South Korea)	FW	Chung Hae-Won	정해원	13 (0)	4	13	4
12	(South Korea)	DF	Kim Hee-Tae	김희태	2 (0)	0	2	0
13	(South Korea)	MF	Hyun Ki-Ho	현기호	6 (1)	1	7	1
16	(South Korea)	DF	Lee Jae-Hee	이재희	12 (1)	0	13	0
17	(South Korea)	FW	Byun Byung-Joo	변병주	4 (0)	1	4	1
18	(South Korea)	MF	Lee Cheon-Heung	이천흥	1 (0)	0	1	0
19	(South Korea)	FW	Park Jong-Won	박종원	7 (3)	0	10	0
20	(South Korea)	DF	Ko Eui-Seok	고의석	3 (1)	0	4	0
21	(South Korea)	MF	Yoo Jong-Wan	유종완	4 (3)	0	7	0
22	(South Korea)	DF	Yoo Tae-Mok	유태목	16 (0)	1	16	1
	(South Korea)	FW	Im Go-Seok	임고석	5 (4)	0	9	0
	(South Korea)	FW	Min Byung-Wook	민병욱	1 (4)	1	5	1
	(South Korea)	DF	Park Bok-Jun	박복준	2 (1)	0	3	0
	(South Korea)	FW	Lee Yong-Seol	이용설	1 (1)	0	2	0
	(South Korea)	DF	Shin Jae-Heum	신재흠	1 (0)	0	1	0
	(South Korea)	MF	Kang Young-Cheol	강영철	0 (1)	0	1	0

== Competition ==
=== Korean Super League ===
==== Standings ====
Pos	Team	Pld	W	D	L	GF	GA	GD	Pts
1	Hallelujah FC (C)	16	6	8	2	28	20	+8	20
2	Daewoo Royals	16	6	7	3	21	14	+7	19
3	Yukong Elephants	16	5	7	4	26	22	+4	17
4	POSCO Dolphins	16	6	4	6	21	21	0	16
5	Kookmin Bank	16	3	2	11	11	30	−19	8

Source: RSSSF
(C) Champions

== Matches ==
M	Date	Tournament	Round	Opponent	Ground	Result^{1}	Scorers	Attendance	Pos
1	05-08	KSL	1	POSCO	Seoul	1–1	Lee Chun-Seok 55'	22,420	1st
2	05-14	KSL	2	Kookmin Bank	Busan	2–0	Lee Tae-Ho 13', Lee Chun-Seok 18'	23,472	2nd
3	05-15	KSL	3	POSCO	Busan	1–1	Lee Chun-Seok 87'	23,810	3rd
4	05-22	KSL	4	Kookmin Bank	Daegu	3–0	Lee Chun-Seok 21', Byun Byung-Joo 22', Chung Hae-Won 82'	25,120	1st
5	05-23	KSL	5	Yukong	Daegu	0–0		22,199	1st
6	06-25	KSL	6	Yukong	Jeonju	2–1	Lee Chun-Seok 18', Lee Tae-Ho 59'	20,412	1st
7	06-26	KSL	7	Hallelujah	Jeonju	3–3	Chung Hae-Won 3', Lee Tae-Ho 67', Cho Kwang-Rae 75'	22,275	1st
8	07-02	KSL	8	Hallelujah	Daejeon	0–1		25,510	1st
9	08-25	KSL	9	Kookmin Bank	Seoul	2–1	Chung Hae-Won 34', 58'	21,046	1st
10	08-31	KSL	10	POSCO	Daegu	2–0	Cho Kwang-Rae 65', Lee Chun-Seok 75'	15,888	1st
11	09-07	KSL	11	Hallelujah	Busan	1–1	Hyun Ki-Ho 50'	20,376	1st
12	09-10	KSL	12	Kookmin Bank	Gwangju	1–1	Lee Chun-Seok 67'	22,252	1st
13	09-17	KSL	13	POSCO	Chuncheon	1–0	Lee Chun-Seok 5'	15,680	1st
14	09-20	KSL	14	Yukong	Seoul	1–2	Min Byung-Wook 69'	13,482	1st
15	09-22	KSL	15	Hallelujah	Seoul	1–2	Yoo Tae-Mok 46'(pen)	21,366	2nd
16	09-25	KSL	16	Yukong	Masan	0–0		32,617	2nd

Source : K-League
KSL : Korean Super League
^{1}Daewoo goals come first.
