= Hwang Jae-man =

South Korean footballer (1953–2010)

Hwang Jae-man 황재만
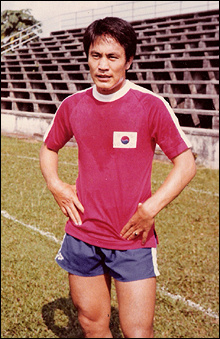

Personal information
- Full name: Hwang Jae-man
- Date of birth: January 1, 1953
- Place of birth: Hwaseong, Gyeonggi, South Korea
- Date of death: January 5, 2010 (aged 57)
- Place of death: Seoul, South Korea
- Height: 1.75 m (5 ft 9 in)
- Positions: Left-back; midfielder

Youth career
- Suwonbuk Middle School
- Joongdong Middle School
- Joongdong High School

College career
| Years | Team | Apps | (Gls) |
| 1971–1974 | Korea University | | |

Senior career*
| Years | Team | Apps | (Gls) |
| 1975–1976 | Seoul Trust Bank FC | | |
| 1977–1979 | ROK Air Force FC | | |
| 1980–1984 | Hallelujah | | |

International career
| 1971–1972 | South Korea U-20 | | |
| 1972–1979 | South Korea | 98 | (2) |

Managerial career
- Hallelujah (Coach)
- Hallelujah
- 1993: KUFF (Director)
Medal record
Men's football
Representing South Korea (as player)
AFC Asian Cup
| Runner-up | 1972 Thailand | Team |
Men's football
Representing South Korea (as player)
Asian Games
| Gold medal – first place | 1978 Bangkok | Team |
- * Club domestic league appearances and goals

Hwang Jae-man (Korean: 황재만, 1 January 1953 – 5 January 2010) was a South Korean former football player and manager, playing as a left-back and midfielder. He is known as a long throw-in during his playing days, and has scored on several occasions with mid-range shots based on powerful kicks. He also displayed solid defensive skills with strong man-to-man marks, and from his twilight years onwards, he captained the club and South Korea, demonstrating leadership.

== Club career ==
He was born in Orokcheonri, Anyongmyeon, Hwaseong, Gyeonggi (modern-day Omokcheondong, Suwon, Gyeonggi-do), and attended Suwonbuk Middle School, Joongdong Middle School, and Joongdong High School, and entered Korea University in 1971. He then scored several attacking goals in the 1974 Korean National Football Championship, contributing significantly to the team's victory in the tournament, and was awarded the Honorable Mention of the tournament for his performance. He then joined the Korea Trust Bank Football Club in 1975, and became a first-year member of the team after the team merged with the Seoul Bank Football Club in 1976 and was reorganized as the Seoul Trust Bank FC. He was also originally scheduled to join the Army Football Club in 1975, but his schedule was changed, and he joined the Republic of Korea Air Force FC in 1976.

Later in 1978, rumors of a move to Hyundai Football Club, which was preparing to be founded as a semi-professional team, were abandoned, and in 1979 he played in the All-Star Game as a member of the Military Unemployment All-Stars. He also played in the Goyeon OB All-Star Game in the same year, and was discharged from the Air Force that year and returned to Seoul Trust Bank. In 1980, he agreed to join the newly formed Hallelujah FC, and on September 9, 1979, he played in a charity match against Vitória in Brazil as part of Hallelujah, helping the club to a 3–0 victory. Later, on the 20th, he played in a charity match between Hallelujah and Eintracht Frankfurt, where he was awarded a penalty kick but would miss, failing to prevent the team from losing 0–2.

Rumors about Hwang playing overseas in the North American Soccer League would emerge but he would never make the transfer to any club there, instead continuing to play for Hallelujah, becoming an original member of the club when it was founded on December 12, 1980. He then made his official debut for the club on March 24, 1981, against Americano, contributing to the team's 2–1 win, and on April 22 he played in a match against South Korea, which the team lost 1–2. Lee Young-moo, took over as captain after he left the team without permission, and on June 26, he assisted Oh Seok-jae's equalizer with a long throw-in just before the end of the second half in a dramatic draw against Operário. In the quarter-finals of the tournament, he once again faced against South Korea, but again failed to qualify for the finals after losing 1–2, and on November 4 of that year, he changed his position as the team's manager.

After the K League's establishment in 1983, Hallelujah was selected to participate in the 1983 season but due to the shortage of players, Hwang would return to participate as a player and later coached the team during the All-Star Game in November of that year. At the age of 34, as the team's injuries increased, he was listed as a candidate player despite his coaching status and made a record of one appearance during the 1984 season.

== International career ==
He participated in the 1971 AFC Youth Championship as a part of the South Korea U-20 team, and was the team's final penalty kicker in the semi-final against Japan, leading the team to a runner-up finish. He then played again in the 1972 AFC Youth Championship, where he played well and contributed to the team's two consecutive runners-up finishes.

He was also selected for the 1972 AFC Asian Cup, and made his official debut for the South Korea national football team on May 5 in a group match against Iraq, but Hwang missed the penalty shootout and the team lost 7–2 on penalties. However, he played as a key player until the final, contributing to the team achieving the runner-up title, and was also selected for the 1972 Merdeka Tournament, where he played well as a key player and contributed to the team's victory. He also participated in the 21st Japan-Korea Regular Tournament and the 1972 President's Cup Football Tournament, but the team would perform poorly in both tournaments. However, he was given another opportunity in a friendly match against Australia and also played in the 1972 King's Cup, where he was well received despite the team's poor performance. For these performances, he would win his first title at the 1972 KFA Awards.

He was selected for South Korea at the 1973 Jakarta Anniversary Tournament, but his poor performance and the national team failed to win the title. Eventually, in July of that year, he was removed from the national team starting list due to a reshuffle of the South Korean squad, and he wouldn't play for the national team for a while.

He was then included in the standing army roster for the 1974 Asian Games and the Asian Football Cup, and returned to the national team after a good performance, including scoring the winning goal in an exhibition match. He was in good form in the same year, assisting Cha Bum-kun's equalizer in an exhibition match against Middlesex Wanderers, but was unable to get any further opportunities as he played a part in the team's defeat due to a poor performance in the third leg of the Asian Games group stage against Kuwait. He was absent from the 23rd Japan-Korea Regular Tournament held shortly afterwards due to his participation in the Koyeon Exhibition. He then participated in the 1973 King's Cup, and was involved in the team's winning goal with a long throw-in in the semi-final against Malaysia and a long throw-in in the final against Thailand, helping the team win their second consecutive title. For his performances for the national team and his affiliates, he won his second title at the 1974 KFA Awards.

In 1975, he was included in the standing army for the 1976 AFC Asian Cup qualifiers, and he scored the winning goal against South Vietnam. In the same year, he performed impressively, including being involved in the team's equalizer goal in the second exhibition match against Borussia Berlin, and was well received after three exhibition matches. In that year, he participated in the 1975 President's Cup Football Tournament and the 1975 Merdeka Tournament in succession, leading the national team to two further tournament titles. After winning the Merdeka International Football Tournament, he was awarded the Order of Sport Merit along with other members of the national team. He also competed in the 1975 King's Cup and the 1976 Summer Olympics qualifiers, where he would make a major contribution to the team's title in the former. For this performance, he won his third title at the 1976 KFA Awards.

He then impressed in an exhibition match against Homa in 1976, and also performed well in an exhibition match against the Army Football Club that followed, scoring the opening goal. However, he suffered a serious injury in the game, breaking his nose bone, and was unable to participate in the 1976 Summer Olympics qualifying match against Chinese Taipei shortly afterwards. On March 6, 1976, during a qualifier match against Japan for the 1976 Summer Olympics, Hwang would play in his 65th international football match at the age of 23 years and 65 days, became the second youngest player to reach the feat. He played in the second exhibition match against Manchester City in the same year, and shortly thereafter took part in the 1976 Merdeka Tournament. He was also listed as part of the South Korean squad for the 1976 President Park's Cup Football Tournament, and contributed to the tournament's victory by assisting Lee Young-moo's opening goal against India. He also played in the 29th Japan-Korea Regular Tournament and scored the winning goal to lead his team to victory. Hwang also played in the 1976 King's Cup, scoring the winning goal against Singapore, but the national team failed to qualify for the final. For his yearly performance, he would win his fourth title at the 1976 KFA Awards.

In 1977, he played in the 1978 FIFA World Cup qualifiers, and his performance was solid in the first round of home and away matches against Israel. He also played in the home and away first round home and final qualifying home matches against Iran, but was unable to play due to a thigh injury in the lead-up to the away match against Australia but the team would lose. He also missed the following home game against Kuwait due to injury, and after recovering from his injury, he played in an away game against Iran, but was unable to prevent his team from losing as he was embroiled in a controversy over a mistrial while he was playing defense.

In 1978, he participated in the 1978 Merdeka Tournament and helped the national team win the title, and also competed in the 1978 President Park's Cup Football Tournament, but was unable to play after the semi-finals due to injury. He also scored the opening goal from the penalty spot in an exhibition match against Sporting Cristal, and was included in the final roster for the 1978 Asian Games to lead the national team to victory. For this performance, he won his fifth title for the 1978 KFA Awards.

Later, in 1979, he participated in the 35th Japan-Korea Regular Tournament, but the team lost 1–2. He was included in the preliminary list of the national team announced shortly afterwards, but failed to impress in another exhibition match against Sporting Cristal and was moved to South Korea B. He later played for the national B team, captaining the team during the 1979 Merdeka Tournament, and helping the national team to a joint title. He also competed in the 1979 Summer Universiade, assisting Kim Ik-hyung's extra goal against Kuwait, but the team failed to qualify for the finals.

== Managerial career ==
After his retirement from playing in 1984, he became the coach of Hallelujah and led the team to gain their first title in the 1988 Korean President's Cup National Football Tournament. He later became the team's head coach and in 1991, won the team's two national sports championships and the military-unemployed football tournament, and won the military-unemployed football Coach of the Year Award. In 1992, he led the team to two consecutive military-unemployed football championships, where he once again won the 1992 Coach of the Year award. In 1993, he was appointed to the board of directors of the Korea Unemployed Football Federation, and in the same year, he led the team to the National Unemployed Football Federation Spring Tournament and won the Coach of the Year Award.

Later, in 1993, he handed over the directorship to Shin Hyun-ho, with Hwang Jae-man himself as the general manager. He later retired from managing in 1998 when the team disbanded due to the 1997 Asian financial crisis. From 2004 until his death, he had been president of the Korea Wheelchair Rugby Association.

== Family and personal life ==
On March 30, 1983, he married his spouse from Japan. His second son, Hwang Dae-gyun, is also a footballer.

After visiting Mexico in 1986, Hwang suffered from myelitis, a neurological disease, Upon initial return, Hwang would state that he still felt healthy but after a few days, started to feel symptoms of a severe cold, his body slowly reducing responsiveness and his toes going numb. He was later paralyzed from the lower body and spent rehabilitation at Severance Hospital in Sinchon-dong, Seoul, in parallel with his managerial career while in a wheelchair.

In 2000, a fundraising campaign for Hwang was held at the 2000 Ancient Athletes Day held by Korea University's Ko Woo Sports Association. In 2003, in commemoration of the 33rd anniversary of the founding of Best Eleven, he was included in the "Best 11 of the '70s" among the "55 players who shone through 100 years of Korean football". In 2006, in commemoration of the 100th anniversary of the opening of the Joongdong Middle School and the Joongdong High School, the General Alumni Association awarded Hwang Jae-man the Joongdong Award of Will. In 2008, the 1971 Dongsim Association, a group of football players who graduated from high school in 1971, including Cho Dong-hyun and Park Byung-chul, collected dues and donated the money.

Hwang died on July 7, 2010, due to worsening spinal nerve palsy, and his remains were interred in Seonyeong, Hwaseong, Gyeonggi.

Hwang and Cha Bum-kun had developed a friendship within their careers in Korea University, Seoul Trust Bank FC, Air Force Football Club, and South Korea by eating Korean pot rice together. When Cha performed the Ice Bucket Challenge in 2014, he thought about Hwang performing the challenge with him in tribute to his death.

== Career statistics ==
=== International goals ===
| No | Date | Venue | Opponent | Score | Result | Competition |
|---|---|---|---|---|---|---|
| 1. | March 19, 1975 | Rajamangala Stadium, Bangkok, Thailand | South Vietnam | 1–0 | 1–0 | 1976 AFC Asian Cup qualifiers |
| 2. | December 4, 1976 | National Stadium Tokyo, Japan | Japan | 2–1 | 2–1 | Friendly |
