= Choi Soon-Young =

South Korean businessman

- 최순영
- Born: 1939 (age 86–87); Sariwon, Hwanghae Province
- Education: Sungkyunkwan University
- Spouse: Lee Hyung-Ja
- Honours: Maengho Medal

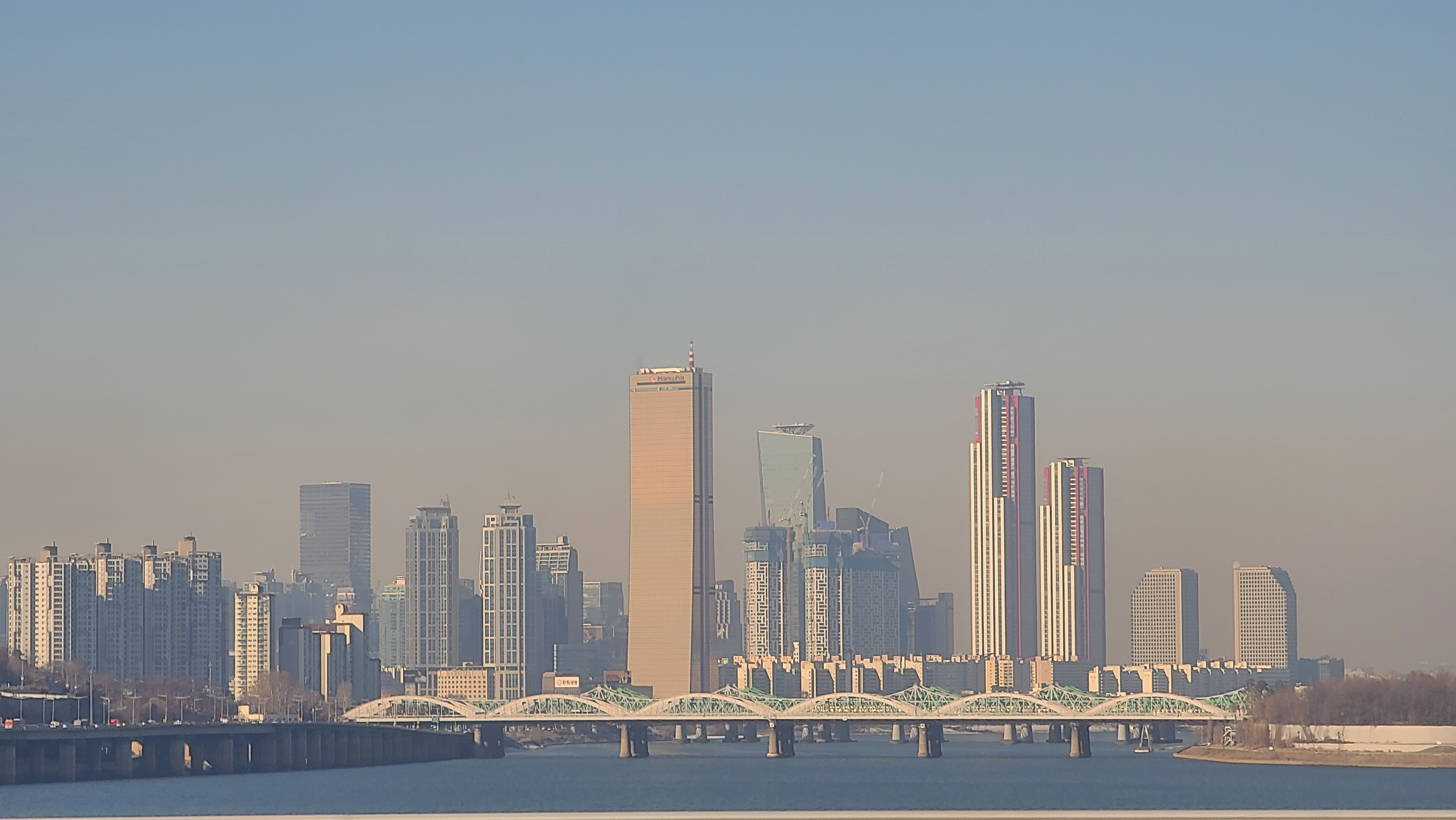
63 building (tallest) at the skyscrapers of Yeouido

Choi Soon-Young is a South Korean businessman who served as the chairman of the Shin Dong Ah Group and president of the Korea Football Association.

He led the group with 22 affiliates and built 63 Building, a Korean landmark, in 1985. However, Shin Dong Ah was disbanded in 1997 due to the 1997 Asian financial crisis

Choi founded the football club Hallelujah FC, one of the original K League teams. The team won the 1983 K League but turned into an amateur club in 1985 to focus on missionary work. The club was disbanded in 1998 due to the Asian financial crisis.

== Early life and education ==
Choi Soon-young attended the all-boys Kyunggi High School located in the Gangnam District of Seoul. He graduated from Sungkyunkwan University with a BA in Commerce.

== Career ==
=== Shin Dong Ah Group ===
Choi served as the chairman of the Shin Dong Ah Group from 1976 to 1999. During his tenure, the group was involved in the construction of Seoul's iconic 63 Building.

==== Tax evasion ====
With the disbandment of Shin Dong Ah Group, Choi Soon-young was questioned by prosecutors on charges of smuggling foreign currency worth 200 billion won. In February 1999, Choi was arrested on charges of smuggling foreign currency by setting up a ghost company Steve Young to smuggle foreign exchange out of the country. In 2003, an arrest warrant was issued for Choi which alleged that he had set up 'Steve Young' a fictitious company created in the Bahamas to embezzle 165 million dollars through Shin Ah Won Co., one of Shin Dong Ah Group's subsidiaries. He was sentenced in 2006 to five years in prison and fined 157.4 billion won. However, two years later, he was granted a special pardon after the inauguration of the Lee Myung-bak government.

Choi Soon-young was also ranked third in the cumulative ranking of delinquent taxes announced by the National Tax Service at the end of 2020. However, the Seoul Metropolitan Government delinquent tax collection team has seized 130 million won worth of land from him.

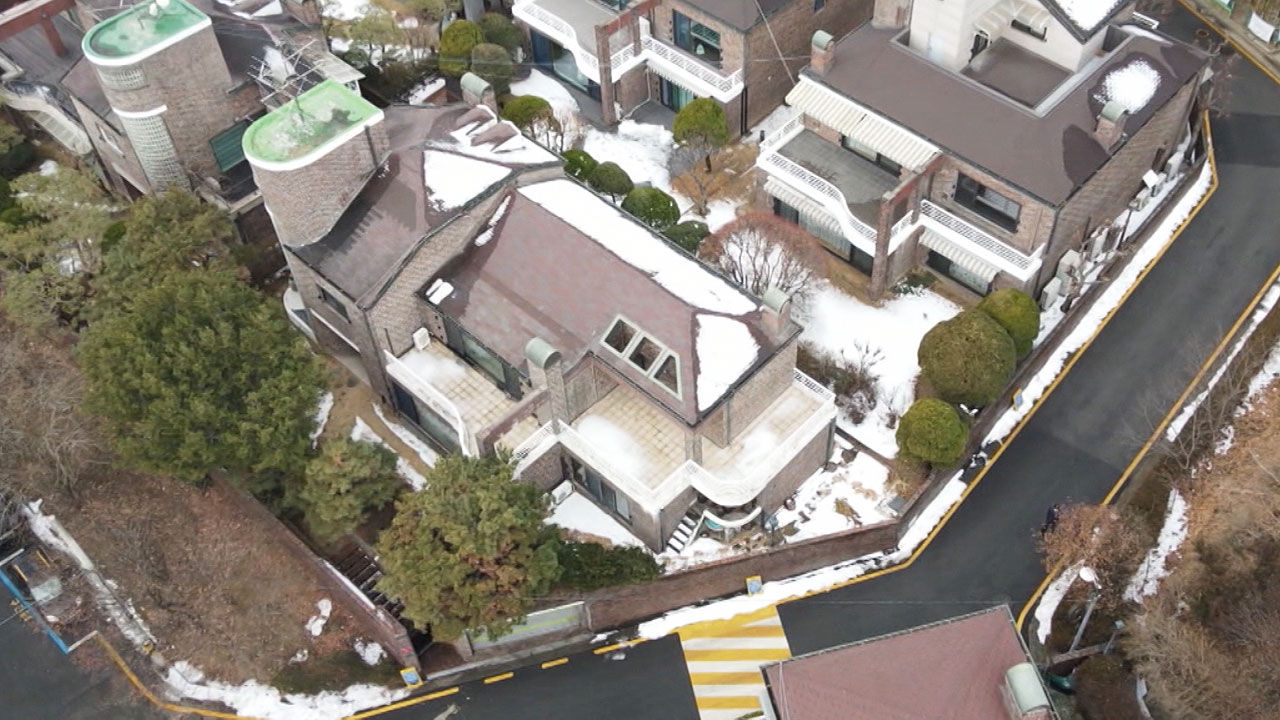
Choi Soon-Young's house in Yangjae-dong, Seoul

=== Korea Football Association ===
Choi served five terms as the president of the Korea Football Association, from 1979 to 1987. During his presidency, the K League was founded in 1983. He also founded and owned Hallelujah FC, the champions of the inaugural season of the K League.

South Korea finished runners-up in the 1980 AFC Asian Cup, losing 3-0 in the final to host Kuwait.

=== Hallelujah FC ===
Hallelujah FC was the first Christian missionary football team in South Korea. Four of its first players, Lee Young-moo, Shin Hyun-ho, Park Sung-hwa, and Hong Sung-ho played for the South Korea national football team. The team won the K League in the inaugural 1983 season.

The team was disbanded in 1998 as a result of the Asian financial crisis but reestablished in 1999. The team changed its name to Goyang Zaicro FC in 2012.

Goyang Zaicro participated in the 2013 K League Challenge, the second division of the K-League. However, it withdrew from the K-League Challenge at the end of the 2016 season.

=== Torch Foundation ===
The Torch Foundation is a Christian missionary group founded by Choi Soon-Young in 1988. It is chaired by Choi's wife, Lee Hyung-Ja, who receives an annual salary of 15 million won. "I live with the help of the church," he said. His wife also receives a salary of 15 million won from the Torch Foundation.

==== Torch Foundation assets ====
An SBS report published a list of the Torch Foundation's assets, valuing its mission center at more than 70 billion won, the land worth 38.4 billion won and the building at 35.1 billion won. Additionally, it stated that the foundation had leased the mission center to Onnuri Community Church and received more than 70 billion won in rent.

The foundation also owns three villas worth more than 10 billion won where the Choi family lives. The foundation also owns land worth 19.3 billion won in Anseong, Sokcho, and Yongin.

=== KAICAM ===
In 1972, Choi founded the Korean Association of Independent Churches And Missions (KAICAM) Christian missionary organization. In 1996, the position of chairman was transferred to his wife, Lee Hyung-ja. The organisation was renamed 'KAICAM' in June 2003. KAICAM advocates for a united community of pastors and missionary group leaders who want to be free from the politics of denominations and denominations. In 2020, it had 2,730 full-time pastors and serves as an influential organization of Christianity in Korea. Lee Hyung-ja served as chairman of the board of directors of the organization until 2011 and has remained a director until at least 2015.

==== The Torch Foundation's control of KAICAM ====
The court judged that the Torch Foundation dominated KAICAM. In 2017, the Suwon court ruled against it, and Ham, who participated in the ruling, once said, "The Torch Foundation has the right to appoint KAICAM, and KAICAM belongs to the Torch Foundation." In addition, it was revealed that the person in charge of accounting in KAICAM received accounting training from the Torch Foundation and that the person in charge of financial audit in KAICAM served as the director of the Torch Foundation's accounting bureau.

There is also content that KAICAM delivered tens of millions of won to the Torch Foundation. KAICAM delivered 50 million won (or 100 million won) in 2016 to the Torch Korean National Diaspora World Mission Competition, the largest event held by the Torch Foundation, the Suwon Court's ruling states.

== Awards and honors ==
Choi has received honorary doctorates from the Southwestern University and Sungkyunkwan University.

=== Profile ===
Career

- 1979 ~ Foundation of the Korean Christian Missionary Church (currently Torch Foundation)
- 1980 Far East Broadcasting Company chairman of the board
- 1983 Hoseo University chairman of the board
- 1984 Taking over the Eternal Academy and changing it to Shin Dong Ah Academy
- 1985 ~ 1988 Jeonju University chairman of the board
- 1986 Asia football Confederation Vice chairman
- 1996 Member of 2002 World Cup Organizing Committee

== See also ==
- Furgate
