= Ham Heung-chul =

South Korean footballer and manager

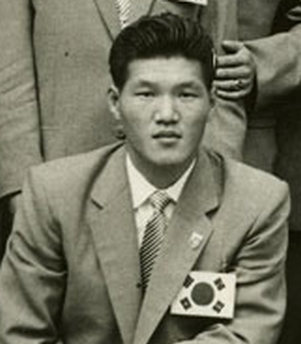
- Ham in 1956

Personal information
- Full name: Ham Heung-chul
- Date of birth: 17 November 1930
- Place of birth: Korea, Empire of Japan
- Date of death: 11 September 2000 (aged 69)
- Place of death: Inje, Gangwon, South Korea
- Height: 1.75 m (5 ft 9 in)
- Position: Goalkeeper

Senior career*
Years	Team	Apps	(Gls)
?–1963	ROK Army OPMG		
1964–1967	Korea Tungsten		

International career
1954–1965	South Korea	51	(0)

Managerial career
- 1972: South Korea
- 1974–1976: South Korea
- 1978–1979: South Korea
- 1982–1985: Hallelujah FC
Medal record
Men's football
Representing South Korea (as player)
AFC Asian Cup
Winner	1956 Hong Kong
Winner	1960 South Korea
Asian Games
Silver medal – second place	1954 Manila
Silver medal – second place	1958 Tokyo
Silver medal – second place	1962 Jakarta
Representing South Korea (as manager)
Asian Games
Gold medal – first place	1978 Bangkok
- * Club domestic league appearances and goals

- Ham Heung-chul
- Hangul: 함흥철
- Hanja: 咸興哲
- RR: Ham Heungcheol
- MR: Ham Hŭngch'ŏl

Ham Heung-chul (Korean: 함흥철; 17 November 1930 – 11 September 2000) was a South Korean football manager and former footballer who previously played as a goalkeeper. While playing for the South Korea national football team, Ham won two titles in the AFC Asian Cup and three silver medals at the Asian Games. He also participated in the 1964 Summer Olympics, but conceded 20 goals during three Olympic matches. After retirement, Ham managed the South Korea national team, winning the 1978 Asian Games. He also managed Hallelujah FC, and became the first manager to win the K League title.

Ham died on 11 September 2000, when he lost his footing and fell off a cliff while climbing Mt. Seorak.

== Honours ==
=== Player ===
ROK Army OPMG

- Korean National Championship: 1954
- Korean President's Cup runner-up: 1957

Korea Tungsten

- Korean National Semipro League (Spring): 1965
- Korean National Semipro League (Autumn): 1965, 1966
- Korean President's Cup: 1965, 1966

South Korea

- AFC Asian Cup: 1956, 1960
- Asian Games silver medal: 1954, 1958, 1962

Individual

- KASA Best Korean Footballer: 1961

=== Manager ===
South Korea

- Asian Games: 1978

Hallelujah FC

- K League 1: 1983

Individual

- K League 1 Manager of the Year: 1983
