= Presidency of Kim Dae-jung =

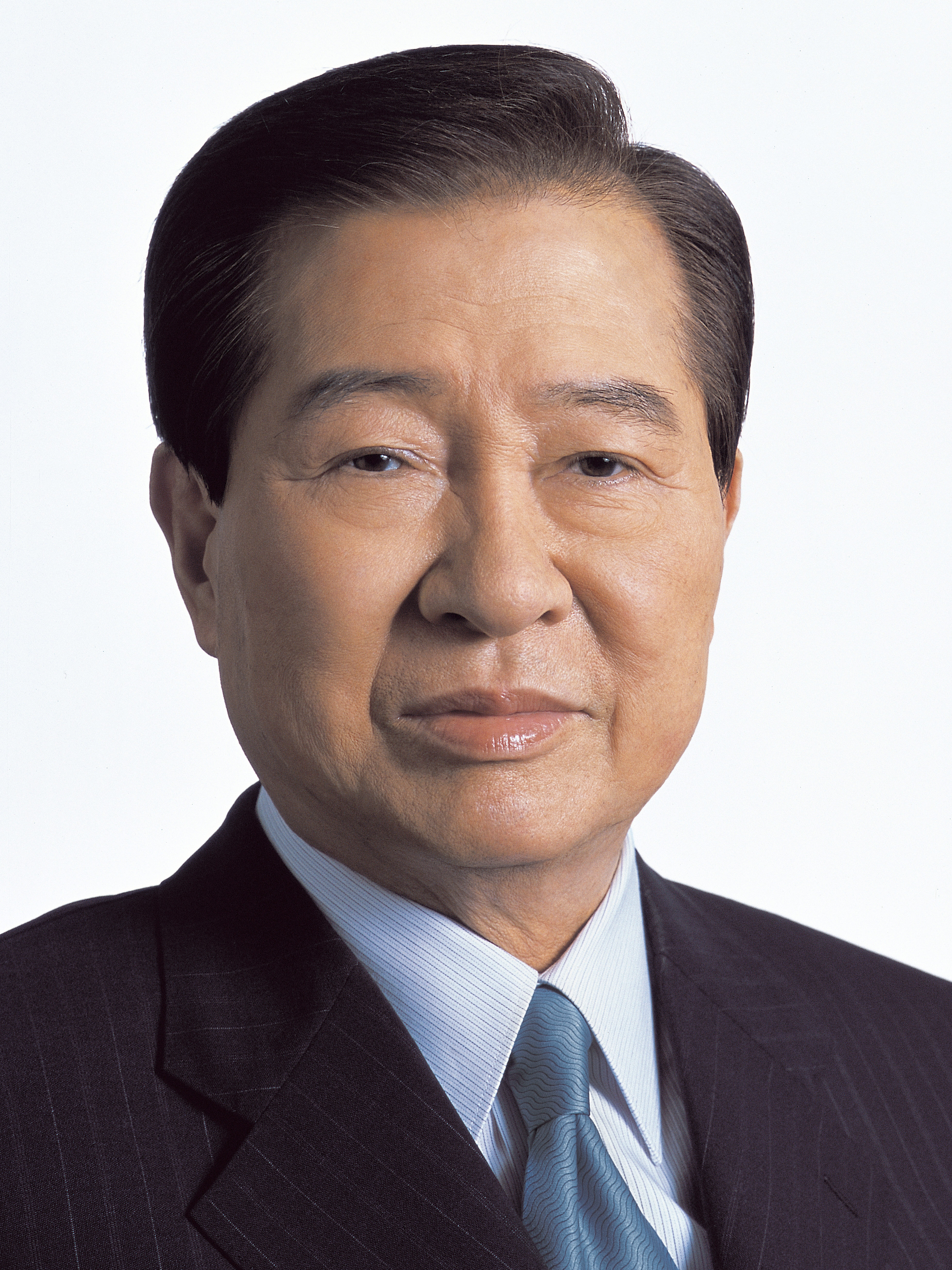
- Presidency of Kim Dae-jung; 25 February 1998 – 25 February 2003
- Prime Minister: Goh Kun; Kim Jong-pil; Park Tae-joon; Lee Han-dong; Chang Sang (acting); Chang Dae-whan (acting); Kim Suk-soo
- Cabinet: Full list
- Party: National Congress (1998–2000); Millennium Democratic (2000–2002); Independent (2002–2003)
- Election: 1997
- Seat: Seoul

The swearing-in of Kim Dae-jung as the eighth president of South Korea on 25 February 1998 marked the first time in Korean history that the ruling party peacefully transferred power to a democratically elected opposition candidate. In his inaugural address, Kim characterized his administration as a "government of the people".

Kim was elected when the 1997 Asian financial crisis hit South Korea hard, and he was "appointed in a time of crisis". In December 1997, shortly after being elected president, Kim Dae-jung consulted with Kim Young-sam to pardon Chun Doo-hwan and Roh Tae-woo, two old enemies who were imprisoned for corruption, and affirmed their contributions to the economic development of South Korea. Kim Dae-jung hoped to use this move to unite all parties in South Korea to deal with the financial crisis together. He advocated reforming the laws and systems that lead to corruption. Kim adhered to the national view of "unity of the people" and opposed narrow party and regional concepts. Under the IMF system, Kim Dae-jung coordinated the departments of all parties in South Korea to carry out sweeping reforms in the four areas of enterprises, finance, public utilities and labor employment. In order to overcome the foreign exchange crisis, Kim and his wife responded to the "gold donation campaign" launched by the Korean people and donated their treasured gold jewelry.

Kim also personally advertised Korean tourism with the HOT group. This was not only the first time in Korean history that a head of state personally filmed an advertisement for the tourism industry, but it was also an unprecedented situation in the international community. Under Kim's leadership, after the Korean economy shrank by 7% in 1998, it grew rapidly by 9.5% in 1999. His reforms not only enabled Korea to get out of the financial crisis in a relatively short period of time, but also transformed the Korean economy from a low-end product export-oriented economy to an information high-tech economy. The reforms also laid a good foundation for Korea's future economic development and enhanced Korea's ability to resist global financial crises such as the 2008 global financial crisis. Kim was therefore recognized by the international community as an "excellent student" in overcoming the financial crisis.

Kim's "Great Unity" national view is also reflected in his advocacy of national and ethnic unity. After taking office, Kim actively promoted reconciliation between the North and South and successfully held the first inter-Korean summit with North Korean leader Kim Jong Il, "bringing sunshine and warmth to the last Cold War region in the global village". In terms of foreign policy with the United States, Japan, China and Russia, Kim implemented "four-power coordination diplomacy", which promoted peace and stability on the Korean Peninsula and enhanced South Korea's international status and influence by strengthening the South Korea-US alliance, improving relations with Japan, China and Russia.

Kim's governing philosophy is the coordinated development of democratic system, market economy and social welfare. To this end, he abandoned the bureaucratic authoritarian system, reformed the chaebol economy and supported the development of small and medium-sized enterprises. He believed that cultivating a strong middle class and civil society is the prerequisite for the modernization of Korean politics. In June 1999, Kim was selected as one of the "50 Leaders Leading Reforms in Asia" by BusinessWeek.

== Economic reforms and recovery ==
The first task of the Kim administration was restoring investor confidence. The administration held a series of intensive meetings with foreign creditors and quickly succeeded in rescheduling one-quarter of Korea's short-term liabilities. He vigorously pushed economic reform and restructuring recommended by the International Monetary Fund, in the process significantly altering the landscape of South Korean economy. He commenced the gold-collecting campaign in South Korea to overcome the debt to the International Monetary Fund.

As a presidential candidate, Kim briefly questioned the conditions attached to the IMF loans and suggested that he might renegotiate it. However, upon his election, Kim quickly recognized the importance of the IMF agreement in restoring South Korea's economic health. Since then, he has implemented the most neoliberal policy among the major presidents of South Korea, leading to his nickname of "Neoliberal Revolutionist" (Korean: 신자유주의 혁명가).

Immediately after taking office, the Kim Dae-jung government pushed for revision of the Outside Auditor Law to facilitate the adoption of consolidated financial statements in accordance with international standards, beginning in 1999. Furthermore, as cross-guarantees allowed loss-making affiliates and subsidiaries with chaebol groups to continue to borrow from banks and drain financial resources from healthier firms, on 1 April 1998, the government prohibited any new intra-chaebol mutual payment guarantees and ordered the phasing-out of the existing guarantees by March 2000. Banks were directed to negotiate financial restructuring agreements with chaebol groups to reduce any outstanding debts, including closing insolvent firms. With the government's commitment to introduce internationally accepted accounting practices, including independent external audits, full disclosure, and consolidated statements by conglomerates, the Kim administration helped to improve the transparency of chaebol corporate balance-sheets and governance and bring Korea's economy to greater integration with the global economy.

In the last year of Kim Young-sam's term, the Asian financial crisis swept through South Korea, and the highly indebted South Korean chaebols suffered a devastating blow, with nine chaebols declaring bankruptcy one after another. The domino-like collapse of the chaebols caused a large amount of international capital to withdraw from South Korea, South Korea's foreign exchange reserves plummeted, and the Korean won depreciated rapidly. Economic reform to revitalize the South Korean economy became an urgent issue for Kim Dae-jung, who had just taken office. The main contents of Kim Dae-jung's reform of the chaebols included improving the transparency of corporate operations, prohibiting mutual debt guarantees, avoiding excessive debt operations, implementing specialized operations to avoid the "octopus claw" development model, strengthening the responsibility of controlling shareholders and operators, governing the non-bank financial institutions owned by the chaebols, stopping mutual investment within the chaebols and illegal internal transactions, and preventing improper wealth accumulation. After discussing with the heads of the five major chaebols in South Korea at the time, namely Hyundai, Daewoo, Samsung, LG, and SK, Kim Daejung introduced the "Five Tasks for Corporate Reform" and "Three Supplementary Tasks" for chaebol reform after taking office. Under the framework of the "5+3 Tasks", the Kim Daejung government adopted three approaches to deal with the chaebols: "closure, assistance, and exchange". For companies with no hope of survival, the government closed them down through bankruptcy, sale, merger, and court takeover.

The government also adopted a proactive foreign investment policy. Scores of banks were closed, merged or taken over by the government, and surviving banks were recapitalized. The chaebol were pressured to lower their perilously high debt-equity ratios and establish greater corporate transparency and accountability. Foreign direct investment, under Kim, was viewed as vital to the financial and corporate reform process as a form of secure, stable and long-term form of investment, and also able to acquire new technologies and managerial practices.

By June 1998, a total of 55 large companies, including Daewoo Group, the second largest chaebol in South Korea at the time, had been closed. The myth of "Daewoo never dies" was also broken with the collapse of Daewoo Group. For companies with heavy debts but hope of survival, the Kim Dae-jung government required creditor banks to provide financial assistance. By June 1998, a total of 83 companies benefited from this and embarked on the road to restructuring. Hyundai Group, the largest conglomerate in South Korea at the time, was also dissolved and reorganized during Kim Dae-jung's economic reforms. Kim's administration did not shy away from using strong-arm tactics to bring about desired results. For example, when LG Group objected to Hyundai taking the controlling share and decided to pull out in the midst of merger negotiations, the newly created Financial Supervisory Commission (FSC) immediately called in LG Group's creditors to discuss punitive measures, including immediate suspension of credit and recall of existing loans and threatened to conduct a tax probe. In the end, LG Group agreed to the merger, relinquishing management control and selling its semiconductor business to Hyundai. Similarly, Samsung was encouraged to sell its automotive operations to Daewoo. Despite worries of a second economic crisis in the wake of Daewoo's bankruptcy in July 1999 (after its chairman, Kim Woo-choong continued to raise the company's indebtedness and aggressively expand in spite of government restructuring and aid), the economic recovery remained on track. By also deciding not to bail out Daewoo, Kim's government conveyed a message to chaebols that no company was too big to fail.

In addition, the Kim Dae-jung government implemented a "large-scale business exchange" policy, which involved merging and reorganizing companies in the same industry under different conglomerates to allow the conglomerates to exchange businesses. This move was intended to solve the problems of redundant investment and excessive business scope of enterprises. However, due to the lobbying of the conglomerates and the government's lack of resolve, many transactions eventually became simple mergers or acquisitions of two companies, thus failing to achieve the goal of business exchange. This foreshadowed the incompleteness of the reforms. While reforming the conglomerate system, the Kim Dae-jung government fully supported small and medium-sized enterprises and venture enterprises to reduce the weight of conglomerates in South Korea's GDP.

In order to cope with the trend of world development, Kim Dae-jung proposed a development path of building a nation based on science and technology and elevated the development of information technology to a national strategy. He often said, "I hope to be the president who revitalizes the IT industry." Kim Dae-jung's support for the information technology industry has injected vitality and competitiveness into the development of the Korean economy. The Kim Dae-jung administration built up country-wide high-speed ICT infrastructure and fostered IT and venture businesses as the future source of growth. In his inaugural address, he expressed a vision for South Korea to advance "from the ranks of industrial societies...into the ranks of the knowledge and information-based societies where intangible knowledge and information will be the driving power for economic development". Today, South Korea is one of the most technologically developed countries in the world and has a well-connected cyberinfrastructure which began to be built and fostered under President Kim. In addition, Kim Dae-jung also advocated the development of the cultural industry, making important contributions to the rise of Korean culture on the global stage. In 1999, Kim Dae-jung increased the budget of the cultural sector by 40%, making the cultural budget account for 1% of the total budget for the first time. The Korean cultural industry benefited greatly during Kim Dae-jung's administration. The Korean Wave also emerged in Asia during this period.

For a long time, South Korea has implemented a "government-controlled financial system". The capital market is underdeveloped, the financial system is unsound, and banking institutions lack risk management awareness. Before the outbreak of the Asian financial crisis, South Korea opened up the financial industry in a disorderly manner when its own financial system was not mature and there was a lack of corresponding regulatory measures, which led to a rapid increase in short-term debt and ultimately caused the financial crisis in the country. In order to deal with the crisis, South Korea accepted US$58.3 billion in aid from the International Monetary Fund in December 1997. Based on the package of measures proposed by the IMF and the World Bank, the Kim Dae-jung government carried out a comprehensive reform of the South Korean financial system. On December 29, 1997, the National Assembly of South Korea passed thirteen financial reform measures. According to the new Bank of Korea Law, the governor of the central bank is directly appointed by the president after discussion by the National Assembly and is in charge of the monetary committee with the most policy-making power, thereby cutting off the Ministry of Finance's actual control over the central bank and enhancing the independence of the central bank.

Under the administration, expenditure on social protection was tripled. Outlays on social protection were increased from 2.6 trillion won (0.6 per cent of GDP) in 1997 to 9.1 trillion won (2.0 per cent of GDP) in 1999. The biggest policies that were introduced or expanded during Kim's term were:

- expansion of the unemployment insurance program by including all firms (originally, only firms with more than 30 employees were covered), shortening the contribution period required for eligibility, and extending the duration of unemployment benefits. Thus the eligible workforce was increased from 5.7 million workers at the beginning of 1998 to 8.7 million at the end of the year.
- introduction of a temporary public work program in May 1998, enrolling 76,000 workers. By January 1999, the program provided 437,000 jobs.
- temporary livelihood protection program covering 750,000 beneficiaries. It also introduced a means-tested noncontributory social pension for 600,000 elderly people.

In April 1998, the Financial Supervisory Commission (FSC), which was directly under the Blue House and responsible for supervising banks, securities companies and insurance companies, was established, marking a turning point in the development of the Korean financial regulatory system. The establishment of the FSC separated the financial regulatory function from the Ministry of Finance and the Bank of Korea. According to the Financial Industry Structure Improvement Act, the FSC was fully responsible for the restructuring of the Korean financial system. In terms of the deposit insurance system, on December 31, 1997, Korea further strengthened the deposit insurance system by revising the Act. On April 1, 1998, the scope of deposit insurance liability of the Korea Deposit Insurance Corporation was expanded to include all deposits of banks, securities companies, insurance companies, merchant banks, mutual savings banks and credit unions. In addition, in order to cope with the financial crisis, the functions of the Korea Asset Management Corporation (KAMCO) were also expanded, and it could purchase non-performing assets of troubled banks and other financial institutions by issuing bonds. In addition, the Kim Dae-jung government changed South Korea's previous passive and closed foreign investment policy and actively opened up to foreign investment, which greatly improved the foreign investment environment in South Korea. In 1999, the amount of foreign investment introduced by South Korea increased sharply from US$8.9 billion in 1998 to US$15.5 billion.

In terms of financial restructuring, the Kim Dae-jung government closed, merged, reorganized and privatized troubled banks and financial institutions at the request of the International Monetary Fund, and injected 55.6 billion won of public funds into the banking industry in 1998 to digest "non-performing loans". During the period from 1998 to early 2003, 32.4% of South Korean financial institutions were closed. Among them, the most serious non-performing loan problem was the comprehensive financial institutions, 93% of which were closed, and only three were still operating normally by 2003. In addition, the Kim Dae-jung government also actively introduced foreign investment to participate in the banking industry and increased the proportion of foreign ownership. According to statistics from the Central Bank of Korea, in 2003, foreign investors held a 38.6% stake in the South Korean banking industry. In order to enhance the security of the financial system, the Kim Dae-jung government also introduced the rapid corrective action (PCA) system based on the United States and formulated loan classification standards and institutional regulations that were more cautious than international standards. From July 1, 1998, South Korea began to tighten the reserve system. Since June 1998, South Korea has also raised the standards for financial accounting and government auditing. In addition, the Kim Dae-jung government has strengthened risk management of short-term foreign currency debt. The country uses international credit rating as a standard to reveal risks.

The reforms were modestly successful in getting the chaebols to change their ownership structure by separating ownership from management. Therefore, the largest changes made in this period were reforms in chaebol corporate governance through consolidated financial statements, independent external audits and reduction of intra-group mutual payment guarantees. Chaebols also streamlined their operations by reducing their excessive leverage and consolidating their many operations in a few core competencies. Some also reduced their debt burden and increased their profitability. After the economy shrank by 5.8 percent in 1998, it grew 10.2 percent in 1999, marking an impressive recovery. South Korea repaid the IMF loan in August 2001, 3 years ahead of schedule. Exports also recovered, led by exporting of semiconductors, automobiles, liquid crystal displays and mobile phones. Foreign investment during 1998 and 1999 exceeded that of the cumulative total for the previous 40 years. Foreign exchange reserves went from a perilously low $3.9 billion in December 1997 to $74.0 billion at the end of 1999, nearly double Korea's short-term external liabilities. The exchange rate strengthened quickly by 30% against the U.S. dollar, to the point of actually causing concern about eroding Korea's international competitiveness, and unemployment fell. The administration also amended the bankruptcy laws, simplifying legal proceedings for corporate rehabilitation and filing of bankruptcy and streamlining provisions for non-viable firms to exit markets.

With the active response of the Kim Dae-jung government, South Korea emerged from the shadow of the financial crisis in a very short time. On December 6, 1999, Kim Dae-jung officially announced the end of the financial crisis. South Korea became the first country in East Asia to recover from the impact of the financial crisis. By August 2001, South Korea's foreign exchange reserves had recovered from US$3.9 billion during the crisis to US$97.8 billion, ranking fifth in the world in terms of foreign exchange reserves; the exchange rate of the Korean won against the US dollar was basically stable at 11,300:1; the unemployment rate dropped from 5.9% in February 1998 to 3.4%; and foreign debt also decreased significantly, from US$180 billion at the end of 1997 to US$127 billion, and South Korea became a net creditor country. On August 23, 2001, South Korea repaid the US$19.5 billion emergency bailout loan from the International Monetary Fund three years ahead of schedule.

The government also adopted a proactive foreign investment policy. Scores of banks were closed, merged or taken over by the government, and surviving banks were recapitalized. The chaebol were pressured to lower their perilously high debt-equity ratios and establish greater corporate transparency and accountability. Foreign direct investment, under Kim, was viewed as vital to the financial and corporate reform process as a form of secure, stable and long-term form of investment, and also able to acquire new technologies and managerial practices.

== Administrative reform ==
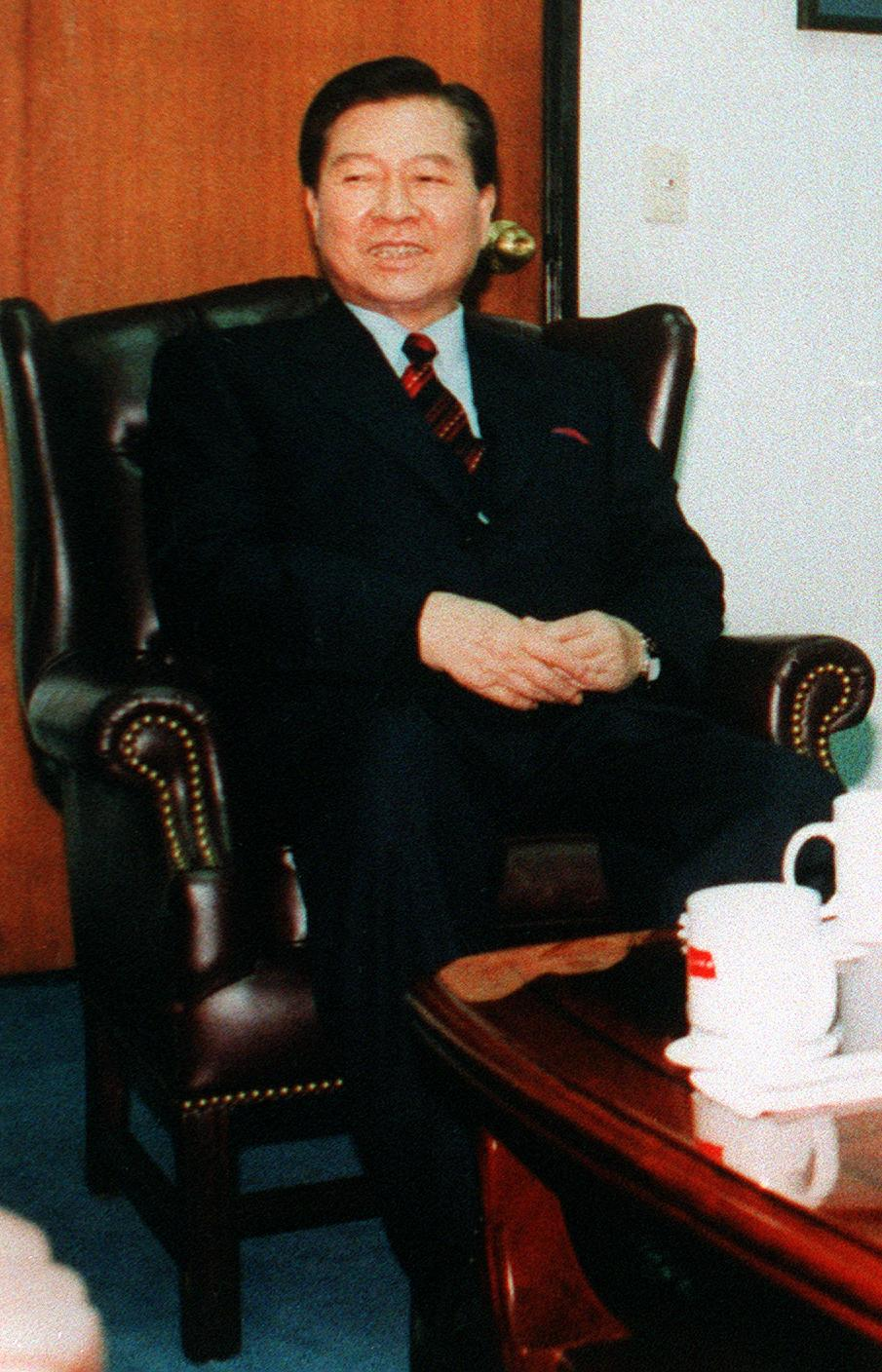
Kim in January 1998.

Kim Dae-jung's government also enhanced labour market flexibility as a key goal of structural reforms. Kim forged corporatist agreements between business, labour and government to get them to work together to resolve the country's financial woes. Kim's long history in the opposition, his pro-labour views and his overall populist, outsider credentials enabled him to get his mobilized and militant working-class voter base to make sacrifices to meet fiscal stabilization, while also asking businesses to make sacrifices at the same time.

After successful tripartite consultative negotiations between labor, business and government, the Labor Standards Act was amended by the National Assembly on 13 February 1998. Under the new accord, business promised to ensure transparency in its management and to take prudent measures when laying off its employees. Specifically, the law provided legal grounds for employment adjustment and permits layoffs only after a company has duly considered the interests of its workers. Labour, on the other hand, agreed to the implementation of flexible worker layoffs for restructuring, while pledging to work towards to enhancing productivity and cooperate with business on terms of wages and working hours. As for government, it committed itself to strengthening its support programs by providing vocational training and information on re-employment. New employment options such as temporary work, part-time employment and work at home were developed. To deal with the expected large-scale layoffs from the economic crisis and restructuring process, the government also pledged to strengthen and expand the coverage of unemployment insurance.

As the South Korean government has long been committed to supporting the development of large enterprises, there is an excessive non- market economic relationship between the government, enterprises and banks, bureaucracy and corruption have proliferated, and government efficiency is low. The outbreak of the Asian financial crisis has fully exposed this drawback. In order to cope with the socio-economic development under the new situation, Kim Dae-jung proposed the administrative reform goal of establishing a "small but efficient service-oriented government". To this end, he carried out administrative reforms in three aspects: adjusting the structure of the public sector, reforming the administrative operation system and improving services to the people.

Between 1998 and 2001, Kim Dae-jung carried out three institutional adjustments aimed at transforming government functions to adapt to changes in administrative needs. These adjustments strengthened presidential powers, enhanced the cabinet's ability to regulate the economy, and strengthened the supervision of social functions such as food and drug safety, women's rights protection, and human resource development and management. At the same time, Kim Dae-jung streamlined the number of government civil servants, reducing the number of South Korean civil servants to the level of 10 years before 1992. In 2002, the ratio of South Korean civil servants to the population was the lowest among OECD countries, making it a veritable "small government". In addition, Kim Dae-jung further narrowed the scope of the public sector by actively promoting the privatization of state-owned enterprises. By 2002, a total of 74 state-owned enterprises had completed the privatization process. In addition, Kim Dae-jung successively delegated 138 functions and powers originally belonging to the central government to local governments at all levels, effectively improving administrative efficiency.

In terms of administrative operation system reform, the government of Kim Dae-jung successively issued and revised the Law on the Establishment of Responsible Operation Agencies, the National Civil Servant Law, the Civil Servant Salary Regulations and the Open Position Operation Regulations, and carried out organizational and personnel operation system reform by introducing open appointment system, responsible operation agency system and result salary system. Twenty percent of the positions of bureau-level cadres were open to external recruitment, and non-governmental civil servants could compete with government civil servants for senior positions. The "open" personnel appointment system enabled the government to improve the level of professionalism by hiring professionals. The salary of civil servants was based on a combination of basic salary and performance bonus, which provided an incentive mechanism for improving the work enthusiasm and innovative spirit of civil servants. Some administrative functions were independently executed by establishing "responsible operation agencies". These agencies clarified their work objectives and personnel and financial status with the government departments under their jurisdiction through contracts, and had relaxed policies and personnel appointment rights. The work results of the "responsible operation agencies" were evaluated by the leaders of the government departments. According to the "results management" system, the government could return all or a certain percentage of the fiscal budget surplus based on its work results.

In terms of improving government services to the people, the Kim Dae-jung administration began to widely implement the administrative service charter system in the central and local governments in 1998, and carried out reforms to improve services in areas where the public was most dissatisfied, such as police, housing, transportation, education, environment, welfare and labor, food and health. In order to improve service quality and government efficiency and transparency, Kim Dae-jung also proposed a plan to realize e-government within five years. In 2001, the portal of Kim Dae-jung's e-government was rated as one of the top ten government portal websites in the world by the United Nations Department of Public Economics and Public Administration (UNDPEPA) and the American Association of Public Administration. Among them, the civil business disclosure system in Seoul was recognized internationally as a model of government anti-corruption construction. Kim Dae-jung's "e-government" plan was continued and developed by his successive governments. At present, South Korea has become a world leader in e-government.

Due to the long-term adherence to the development policy of "economic growth first, welfare second", South Korea's social security expenditure as a percentage of GDP is far lower than the average level of OECD countries. Faced with the large number of business failures and rising unemployment caused by the Asian financial crisis, building a social security system that is compatible with the free market economy has become another urgent problem for the Kim Dae-jung government. This is also one of the conditions for the IMF's financial assistance to South Korea. To this end, Kim Dae-jung took the development of "productive welfare" as the direction of reform. In order to accelerate the process of labor flexibility, the labor union, employers and government of South Korea established the Labor-Management-Government Committee in January 1998 and signed the "Tripartite Agreement" in February, which made it legal for financially distressed companies to lay off employees. At the same time, the state has assumed social responsibility in principle, including guaranteeing the minimum social standard of living.

In terms of social insurance, the Kim Dae-jung government expanded the coverage of social insurance. By 2000, all workers, regardless of the size of their enterprises, were legally entitled to unemployment insurance, work injury compensation insurance, national pension insurance, and medical insurance. The social insurance contribution rates of employers, employees, and government budgets were all increased. Kim Dae-jung also merged and consolidated the medical insurance systems that were previously operated separately in different regions of South Korea, and established a unified national medical insurance system in July 2000. He also promoted the separation of medicine and pharmacy in accordance with the revised Pharmacist Law. In terms of social relief, the National Minimum Living Standard Guarantee Law was introduced in 1999, which guaranteed the minimum living standard of the people and supported the self-reliance of the people by providing financial assistance to low-income groups through national finance. In addition, during Kim Dae-jung's tenure, South Korea also formulated or revised a series of social welfare laws and regulations, such as the Domestic Violence Prevention Law (1998), the Parents Welfare Law (2002), the Child Welfare Law (1999), and the Disability Welfare Law (1999).

== Domestic policy ==
During Kim Dae-jung's presidency, South Korea's human rights situation improved significantly. In January 2001, several human rights laws and regulations were passed by the National Assembly, including the Special Law on Correcting the Truth of Doubtful Deaths, the Law on Restoring the Reputation and Compensation of Individuals Related to the Democracy Movement, and the Law on Correcting the Truth of the Jeju "April 3rd" Incident and Restoring the Reputation of Victims. These laws led to the redress of wrongful convictions and miscarriages of justice in South Korea's past democratic movement, with victims and their families receiving compensation from the government. In May, at Kim Dae-jung's urging, the South Korean government enacted the National Human Rights Commission Law. In November, the National Human Rights Commission, an independent human rights body free from interference and control, was formally established. This provided legal and institutional guarantees for the development of human rights in South Korea. Due to strong opposition from the opposition parties and conservative institutions, the amendment to the much-criticized South Korean National Security Law failed to pass. However, a series of measures taken to revise the National Security Law emphasized the necessity of its careful implementation and strengthened human rights awareness during law enforcement. To protect the human rights of prisoners, the Kim Dae-jung administration amended the Criminal Code. The revised criminal law provides protection for the right of prisoners to appeal and improves the punishment system, prohibiting staff in correctional facilities from arbitrarily using restraints. The revised criminal law also allows prisoners to read newspapers, does not restrict prisoners' hairstyles, and allows unconvicted prisoners not to wear prison clothes. Released prisoners are entitled to basic living security assistance from the people.

The Kim Dae-jung government made many efforts to improve the social status of women and protect their rights. In July 1998, the Kim Dae-jung government began to implement the Special Act on Punishment of Domestic Violence Crimes and the Act on Prevention of Domestic Violence and Protection of Victims, which aimed to eliminate domestic violence ; in January 1999, the Act on Anti-Gender Discrimination and Victim Assistance was promulgated. In January 2001, the first Ministry of Women in South Korea was established. Democratic Party lawmaker Han Myung-sook was appointed by Kim Dae-jung as the first head (minister) of the Ministry of Women in South Korea. In addition, Kim Dae-jung appointed four female heads in the Ministry of Culture and Tourism, the Ministry of Environment and the Ministry of Health and Welfare. Lee In-ho, who was fluent in Russian, was appointed as the South Korean ambassador to Russia. On January 3, 2002, Army Colonel Yang Seung-sook was promoted to brigadier general, becoming the first female general in South Korean history. Kim Dae-jung awarded her the Three-Sword Technique. On January 29, Kim Dae-jung appointed Park Ji-won, the former chief policy planning representative, as the first female spokesperson for the Blue House On July 11, Kim Dae-jung appointed Jang Sang, the first female acting prime minister of South Korea.

== Foreign policy ==
=== North Korea policy ===
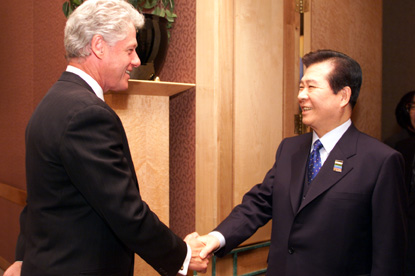
Dae-jung with U.S. president Bill Clinton in September 1999

Kim Dae-jung was born during the Japanese occupation and experienced the division of the Korean Peninsula after World War II. He firmly believed that North–South reconciliation was "the best way to end the tragedy of national division and unify the motherland", and a prerequisite for national peace and prosperity. As early as 1971, when Kim Dae-jung first ran for president of South Korea, he boldly proposed a "three-stage unification theory", advocating "North-South exchanges, opening the door to diplomacy with communist countries, and peaceful cooperation with the four major powers surrounding the Korean Peninsula." This caused a great stir at a time when the South Korean government was still advocating "unification by eliminating communism". In 1972, he also proposed that North and South Korea simultaneously join the United Nations and obtain cross-recognition from the international community. In the early 1980s, Kim Dae-jung adjusted the "three-stage unification theory" based on the international situation, proposing to achieve peaceful unification of North and South Korea through three stages: "peaceful coexistence and exchanges—confederation—complete unification." In 1993, Kim Dae-jung visited Germany to study the reunification of Germany, further enriching and perfecting the "three-stage unification theory". Kim Dae-jung's Three-Stage Unification Theory, published in August 1995, proposed a three-stage unification plan of "North-South Union", "Federalism" "a Unified State". After 30 years of research, he believed that the "Three-Stage Unification Theory" was correct, so he wanted to be the "Unification President".

After Kim Dae-jung took office as president in 1998, the inter-Korean reconciliation policy, known as the Sunshine Policy, was officially implemented. In his inaugural address, Kim Dae-jung proposed three guiding principles for the Sunshine Policy: First, South Korea would never tolerate any military provocations by North Korea that would disrupt peace; second, South Korea had no intention of annexing North Korea to achieve unification; and third, South Korea would expand reconciliation and cooperation with North Korea. On March 26, 1998, at a cabinet meeting chaired by President Kim Dae-jung, South Korean Unification Minister Kang In-deok presented a report on the new "Guidelines for North Korea Policy." The report pointed out that in order to achieve the goal of improving inter-Korean relations through peace, reconciliation and cooperation, the Kim Dae-jung government will implement the following specific policies: First, the North and South must faithfully implement the "Basic Agreement" reached by both sides in December 1991; Second, under the principle of separation of politics and economics, encourage the development of inter-Korean economic cooperation, increase investment in North Korea, and simplify the licensing procedures for economic cooperation; Third, urge the Red Cross to prioritize the reunification of separated families with North Korea, provide government subsidies for reunification expenses for separated families, and simplify the legal procedures for mutual visits; Fourth, help North Korea solve the food shortage problem through the development of agricultural and economic cooperation, as well as humanitarian aid ; Fifth, limit and eliminate weapons of mass destruction such as nuclear weapons and achieve arms control ; Sixth, support North Korea in normalizing relations with the United States, Japan and other Western countries.

On June 16, 1998, Chung Ju-yung, honorary chairman of Hyundai Group, led 500 cattle through Panmunjom into North Korea, initiating the famous "cattle diplomacy" and opening the prelude to North–South economic cooperation. The Sunshine Policy is not a simple policy of tolerance towards North Korea, but rather a policy based on firm security. On June 15, 1999, the North and South engaged in the First Battle of Yeonpyeong, with North Korean ships escorting North Korean fishing boats across the North Korean border. The two sides eventually engaged in armed combat, resulting in the sinking of one North Korean torpedo boat and damage to one patrol boat. In March 2000, based on the development of North–South civilian exchanges, South Korean Minister of Culture Park Ji-won and North Korean special envoy Song Ho-kyung held their first secret meeting in Singapore. On March 9, Kim Dae-jung, who was visiting Germany, delivered the "Berlin Declaration," urging North–South reconciliation. On April 8, the special envoys from the North and South reached a consensus in Beijing on their first summit meeting, namely the "April 8 Agreement".

On June 13, 2000, Kim Dae-jung made an official visit to Pyongyang and held a summit meeting with Kim Jong-il, the first meeting between the leaders of the two Koreas in more than half a century since the Korean Peninsula was divided. Upon his arrival in Pyongyang, Kim Dae-jung was greeted by Kim Jong-il, and other North Korean officials, as well as 600,000 Pyongyang citizens lining the streets to welcome him. From June 13 to 15, Kim Dae-jung and Kim Jong-il exchanged views frankly on issues such as reconciliation and unification between the two Koreas, family reunification, and bilateral exchanges and cooperation. The two sides reached consensus in all areas and issued the North-South Joint Declaration on June 15. The contents of the North-South Joint Declaration include: the North and South will resolve the national reunification on their own; the two sides will promote reunification in the common ground of their respective proposed "federal system" and "confederation system"; through economic cooperation, the national economy will be developed in a balanced way, and cooperation and exchanges in various fields such as society, culture, sports, health, and environment will be strengthened; the two sides will exchange visiting delegations of separated families before August 15; the two sides will hold inter-agency dialogue as soon as possible, and Kim Jong-il will visit South Korea at an appropriate time. The summit between the leaders of North and South Korea was of profound significance and provided an opportunity to create peace on the peninsula. On October 13, Kim Dae-jung was awarded the Nobel Peace Prize by the Norwegian Nobel Committee for his outstanding contributions to the cause of peace and democracy on the Korean Peninsula, becoming the first Nobel Prize winner in South Korea.

However, the historic event was tainted significantly by allegations that at least several hundred million dollars had been paid to North Korea, known as the cash-for-summit scandal. Hyundai transferred $500 million to the North just months before the summit, triggering criticism that the South Korean government paid for the summit. Hyundai claimed the money was a payment for exclusive business rights in electric power facilities, communication lines, an industrial park, cross-border roads and railway lines in North Korea. And in this regard, Park Jie-won was charged with violating domestic laws on foreign exchange trade and inter-Korean cooperation affairs while orchestrating covert money transfers by Hyundai to North Korea. Park played a pivotal role in arranging the first Inter-Korean summit. In May 2006, he was sentenced to three years in prison. Park was released in February 2007, and pardoned in December 2007. Also to persuade North Korea to attend the summit, several "unconverted long-term prisoners" kept by South Korea were released and returned to North Korea.

Kim Dae-jung's Sunshine Policy brought about an unprecedented reconciliation between North and South Korea. On August 15, 2000, Liberation Day, the two Koreas held a reunion of separated families after 15 years On September 15, at the opening ceremony of the Sydney Olympics, the sports delegations of North and South Korea entered the stadium together for the first time, carrying the flag of the Korean Peninsula. On September 24, a 13-member North Korean delegation led by Kim Il-chol, Minister of the People's Armed Forces of North Korea, crossed Panmunjom to participate in the North-South Defense Ministers' Meeting held on Jeju Island. After the meeting, Kim Dae-jung met with Kim Il-chol and his delegation at the Blue House. This was the first time that a North Korean military leader had crossed the Military Demarcation Line and visited the Blue House. The Mount Kumgang tourism project of Hyundai Asan Group of South Korea and the Asia-Pacific Peace Committee of North Korea, the Kaesong Industrial Complex, and the North–South railway connection project all began during Kim Dae-jung's administration. The Sunshine Policy also had a very positive impact on North Korea. In 2000, North Korea established or resumed diplomatic relations with more than 10 Western countries, including the United Kingdom and Italy. In 2002, North Korea began a relatively in-depth economic reform. The Sunshine Policy was continued and developed by the Roh Moo-hyun government after Kim Dae-jung. However, in 2003, a scandal was exposed regarding the Kim Dae-jung government's remittance to North Korea through Hyundai Asan before the inter-Korean summit. As a result, Kim Dae-jung's Sunshine Policy was questioned and criticized. After Lee Myung-bak became the President of South Korea in 2008, the Sunshine Policy was abandoned.

==== Four-power coordination diplomacy ====
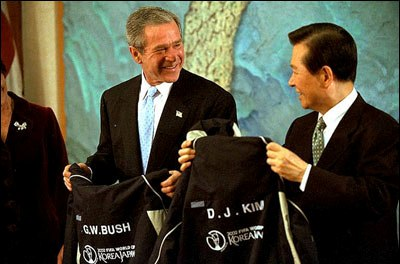
George W. Bush and Kim Dae-Jung at the Blue House, in Seoul, South Korea in 2002.

As a symbol of South Korean democracy, Kim Dae-jung received assistance from the United States on several occasions during the early democratic movement. During his tenure, Kim Dae-jung's policy toward the United States was to strengthen the South Korea-US alliance. Kim Dae-jung believed that the US military presence in South Korea was in the national interest of South Korea and hoped that the status of the US military in South Korea could be equal to that of the US military in Japan. In August 2000, Kim Dae-jung said in an interview with The Washington Post : "Even after the reunification of North and South Korea, the US military presence in Northeast Asia must be maintained. If the US military withdraws, there will be a large power vacuum in the region, which will lead to hostility among the countries in the region for hegemony." Kim Dae-jung's views on the US military presence in South Korea were also understood by Kim Jong-il. Regarding the anti-American sentiment in South Korea, Kim Dae-jung believed that it should be adjusted and resolved through the principles of reciprocity and peace. Kim Dae-jung also hoped that the United States and North Korea could improve their relations. During Bill Clinton's presidency, the United States gave great support to Kim Dae-jung's Sunshine Policy. The South Korea-US relationship improved to an unprecedented level. In October 2000,US President Clinton met with Kim Jong-il's special envoy, Cho Myong-rok, the first vice chairman of the National Defense Commission of North Korea, at the White House in Washington and issued the "US-North Korea Joint Communiqué" declaring that "the two governments will no longer be hostile to each other" and "will establish a new type of relationship that is different from the past hostile relationship". On October 23, then -US Secretary of State Albright visited North Korea at the invitation of Kim Jong-il and met with him to prepare for Clinton's visit to North Korea. At Kim Jong-il's invitation, Clinton originally planned to visit North Korea, but due to being busy with Middle Eastern affairs and the expiration of his term, he was unable to find the time to visit North Korea. In 2001, George W. Bush became the US president, leading ties with North Korea to deteriorate. After the September 11 attacks, Bush listed North Korea as part of the axis of evil, and relations between the United States and North Korea reached another extreme In order to repair the broken relationship between North Korea and the United States, Kim Dae-jung did his best to eliminate the gap between the Sunshine Policy and the axis of evil. In October 2003, Bush sent the Assistant Secretary of Defense for Asian and Pacific Affairs to North Korea to show that the United States treated North Korea differently than Iraq. However, North Korea took a tough stance against the US envoy, announcing that it possessed highly enriched uranium and claiming that this was to contain the US military threat. At the same time, North Korea hoped to reconcile with the United States through negotiations. However, the United States insisted that North Korea would give up its nuclear weapons before dialogue would take place.

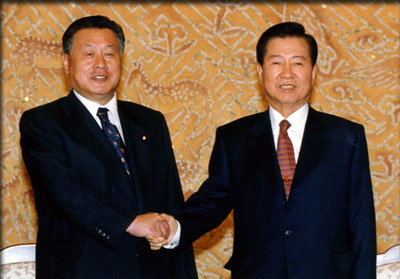
Yoshiro Mori and Kim Dae-jung in 2000

While strengthening the South Korea-US alliance, Kim also worked to improve relations with Japan. South Korea and Japan formally established diplomatic relations on June 22, 1965. At that time, South Korean President Park Chung-hee was eager to obtain funds and technology from Japan to develop the economy. Without resolving historical issues, he signed the Treaty on Basic Relations between South Korea and Japan despite strong domestic opposition. Despite that, South Korea-Japan relations did not develop smoothly. In 1998, Japanese Prime Minister Keizo Obuchi put forward the political view that "what happened in the 20th century should be resolved in the 20th century" and invited Kim Dae-jung to visit Japan. In October, during his visit to Japan, Kim Dae-jung signed the Joint Declaration on the South Korea-Japan Partnership, which established a new type of partnership for the 21st century. For the first time, Japan expressed "deep remorse and apology" to South Korea on historical issues in the form of a joint declaration. South Korea agreed to lift the ban on imports of Japanese cultural products in three phases over five years. South Korea and Japan also signed a new South Korea-Japan Fisheries Agreement, which improved bilateral relations. In 2002, South Korea and Japan jointly hosted the World Cup. Kim Dae-jung and Prime Minister Junichiro Koizumi attended the opening ceremony in Seoul and delivered speeches. On June 30, Kim attended the closing ceremony of the World Cup in Japan. Kim Dae-jung and his wife also watched the final match accompanied by the Emperor and Empress of Japan. 2002 was called the "Year of Japan-South Korea Exchange". The holding of the South Korea-Japan World Cup became an important historical event in the development of South Korea-Japan relations. While advocating for the improvement of relations between the United States and North Korea, Kim Dae-jung also hoped that Japan would improve relations with North Korea. On September 17, 2002, Koizumi visited North Korea and signed the Japan-North Korea Pyongyang Declaration with Kim Jong-il.

Kim Dae-jung visited China many times and was called an "old friend of the Chinese people" by the Chinese government. His first visit to China was in 1994 when he attended the opening ceremony of the Pacific Academic Symposium at the invitation of the Chinese Institute of Foreign Affairs. On 2 November 1994, during his visit to the Chinese Academy of Social Sciences, Kim Dae-jung was awarded the title of "Honorary Research Professor of the Chinese Academy of Social Sciences". On November 12, 1998, at the invitation of Chinese President Jiang Zemin, Kim Dae-jung visited China for the first time as President of South Korea. During the visit, Kim and Jiang announced that the relationship between South Korea and China would be upgraded from the "friendly and cooperative relationship" established when the two countries established diplomatic relations six years ago to a "South Korea-China partnership for the 21st century". This was a milestone in the history of the development of relations between the two countries. During Kim Dae-jung's tenure, the economic and trade development between South Korea and China continued the growth momentum since the establishment of diplomatic relations between the two countries. In 2002, the last year of Kim Dae-jung's term and the tenth anniversary of the establishment of diplomatic relations between the two countries, bilateral trade between South Korea and China reached US$31.5 billion, five times that at the beginning of the establishment of diplomatic relations. South Korea and China became each other's third largest trading partners. China also became the largest destination for South Korea's foreign investment. On the Korean Peninsula issue, the Chinese government supported the reconciliation between North and South Korea. The Kim Dae-jung government also supported China's accession to the World Trade Organization.

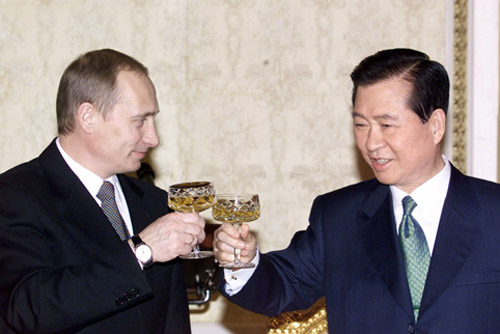
In February 2001, Russian president Vladimir Putin dined with Kim Dae-Jung.

After the collapse of the Soviet Union in 1991, Russia actively developed bilateral relations with South Korea in order to obtain economic assistance and cooperation from South Korea. During Kim Dae-jung's administration, the two countries continued to consolidate their friendly relations, and bilateral cooperation in the economic, technological and military fields continued to expand. In 1999, Kim Dae-jung made a state visit to Russia, and the two sides issued a joint statement on further developing a comprehensive and complementary partnership. In the same year, the Russian Minister of Defense visited South Korea, and the two sides decided to hold regular mutual visits between military leaders and consultation meetings on defense policy. On February 26, 2001, Russian President Vladimir Putin visited South Korea. The two countries reached agreements on a number of political and economic cooperation agreements and issued a joint statement. The two sides decided to hold regular high-level meetings of the president, prime minister and speaker of parliament to further develop the complementary partnership between the two countries. Russia supports further reconciliation between North and South Korea and the realization of peace on the Korean Peninsula. In 2001, the two countries signed the "Draft Agreement on South Korea-Russia Space Technology Cooperation". Russia will help South Korea build a launch station that can launch its own satellites (in May 2004, South Korea became the second country in the world, after Russia, to have the technology of vertical launch from a missile launch pad). The two countries also cooperate extensively in the joint development of Siberian resources. In addition, the Kim Dae-jung government proposed a blueprint for building a "steel Silk Road", planning to build a Eurasian land bridge from Busan, South Korea through North Korea to Europe (Kim Dae-jung had reached an agreement with North Korea on reconnecting the Korean Peninsula through the Gyeongui Line during the first inter-Korean summit in June 2000). This idea was put back on the agenda during Putin's visit to South Korea in 2013.

==== Other countries ====
Kim Dae-jung strongly supported the democratic cause in Myanmar and opposed the suppression of the independence of East Timor. On August 30, 1999, East Timor held a referendum under the supervision of the United Nations, and 78.5% of East Timor residents supported independence. In response, armed groups supported by the Indonesian military carried massacres in East Timor. Kim Dae-jung was extremely indignant about this human rights abuse. At the APEC summit held in Auckland, New Zealand on September 13, Kim Dae-jung lobbied the heads of state of the United States, Japan, China and other countries. On the eve of the closing of the conference, the leaders of South Korea (Kim Dae-jung), the United States (Bill Clinton ) and Japan (Keizo Obuchi) issued a statement supporting the independence of East Timor and demanding that the United Nations and Indonesia make a positive response. Kim Dae-jung also pressured the Indonesian finance minister attending the conference, demanding that the Indonesian government come up with a solution, otherwise he would mobilize all the heads of state attending the conference to issue an APEC statement. After midnight that night, the bloody crackdown in East Timor stopped. After the APEC meeting, the United Nations Evergreen Force began to enter East Timor, and South Korea also sent troops to support the operation. Later, the Evergreen Force was called "messengers of peace" by the East Timorese people, and the largest main road in the center of East Timor was named "Road of Korean Friends". When the vice president of the East Timorese Resistance Association visited the Blue House, he told Kim Dae-jung: "After Indonesia occupied East Timor, nearly 200,000 of its citizens lost their lives. If it weren't for President Kim, I'm afraid another 100,000 people would have lost their lives."

Regarding the human rights issue in Myanmar, Kim Dae-jung once wrote a joint letter with 100 members of parliament and wrote two personal letters to the Myanmar military government to protest and support Aung San Suu Kyi. In 1998, when then UN Secretary-General Kofi Annan came to South Korea to receive the Seoul Peace Prize, Kim Dae-jung also urged the United Nations to play a greater role in the Myanmar issue. In November 1999, during the ASEAN+3 meeting in Manila, Kim Dae-jung met with then Myanmar Prime Minister Than Shwe and persuaded the Myanmar military government to have a dialogue with Aung San Suu Kyi. Kim Dae-jung also actively developed relations with neighboring Asia-Pacific countries and discussed with leaders of Asia-Pacific countries how to deal with the financial crisis and maintain democracy and human rights in the Asia-Pacific region at international conferences in the Asia-Pacific region. During his presidency, Kim Dae-jung visited Malaysia, Vietnam, Mongolia, New Zealand and Australia, the Philippines, Brunei, Singapore and Indonesia.

The Kim Dae-jung government maintained good relations with the European Union and actively promoted the improvement of relations between the EU and North Korea. On October 20, 2000, South Korea hosted the Third Asia-Europe Meeting as the host country. 26 leaders from Asian and European countries attended the meeting and adopted the "2000 Asia-Europe Cooperation Framework" and the "Seoul Declaration on Peace on the Korean Peninsula". The United Kingdom was the first EU country to establish diplomatic relations with South Korea. On March 19, 1998, Queen Elizabeth II and Prince Philip of the United Kingdom visited South Korea. This was the first visit by the British royal family to South Korea in 100 years since the signing of the Treaty of Amity and Commerce between the two countries in 1883. During Kim Dae-jung's visit to the UK in December 2000, he was awarded the Order of St. Michael and St. George (GCMG) by Queen Elizabeth and Cambridge University also awarded him an honorary doctorate in law. After his visit to the UK, Kim Dae-jung made state visits to Norway and Hungary and attended the European Parliament in Strasbourg, France. Kim Dae-jung was the first Asian leader to deliver a speech at the European Parliament. The following year, the South Korea-EU summit began to be held regularly.

After the establishment of the Kim Dae-jung government in 1998, the first foreign leader to visit was German President Herzog. Germany affirmed and supported Kim Dae-jung's measures to deal with the Asian financial crisis and his Sunshine Policy towards North Korea. During his visit to Germany in March 2000, Kim Dae-jung issued the Berlin Declaration urging reconciliation between North and South Korea, which played a key role in facilitating the first inter-Korean summit. During this visit to Europe, Kim Dae-jung also visited Italy, the Vatican and France. Kim Dae-jung was the first South Korean president to visit Rome. He and his wife met with Pope John Paul II. During his visit to France, Kim Dae-jung proposed to French President Chirac that the two countries jointly build a "trans-Eurasian information network" so that Asia and Europe could become "network neighbors" through the "Silk Road of Light Speed".

On March 21, 2001, former South African President Nelson Mandela visited South Korea. Mandela and Kim Dae-jung had similar experiences, both winning the Nobel Peace Prize at the age of 75. When Kim Dae-jung ran for president for the last time, Mandela gave him the watch that had accompanied him for 27 years in prison. During his visit to South Korea, Mandela expressed his support for Kim Dae-jung's Sunshine Policy. The two issued an "Initiative for World Peace and Prosperity", deciding to work together for world peace and democracy, to protect human rights and to eliminate poverty.

== Relationship with former presidents ==
After Kim achieved the presidency and moved into the Blue House, there was uncertainty and considerable speculation about how he would deal with previous presidents: he had been sentenced to death under Chun Doo-hwan, Roh Tae-woo was Chun's number two and Kim Young-sam had been his political rival.

However, in December 1997 as president-elect, he advised outgoing president Kim Young-sam to pardon Chun and Roh who were imprisoned in 1996, in the spirit of national unity. Both Roh and Chun would attend Kim's inauguration ceremony in February 1998. Early in his term Kim invited Chun and Roh, both of whom attempted to have him killed, to the Blue House and refrained from seeking political vengeance. Subsequently, Kim organized gatherings with the former presidents to seek advice, an unprecedented move. After coming back from overseas visits, he invited them to the Blue House to explain the outcomes. During Kim's final days on his deathbed, the former presidents visited him and Chun met Lee Hee-ho, Kim's wife and former first lady, and recounted Kim's display of magnanimity towards him, even though he had once had him put on death row. On 10 August 2009, eight days before his death, Kim was visited by his predecessor and rival Kim Young-sam. Next Day, President Lee Myung-bak also visited at the hospital.

== Political developments ==
When Kim Dae-jung entered office, he appointed Kim Jong-pil, formerly part of the Park Chung Hee dictatorship and Park's prime minister, as his first prime minister in return for Jong-pil endorsing his candidacy in a power-sharing agreement before the 1997 election. Kim's National Congress for New Politics, and Jong-pil's United Liberal Democrats (ULD) formed a coalition, but did not have a majority in the National Assembly. Instead, the now opposition Grand National Party (GNP) of Lee Hoi-chang held a majority. During the first six months in 1998, most of the 100 major reform measures failed to materialize due to the lack of the legislative support and partisan compromise. It was only in September 1998 that the ruling coalition secured a majority in the National Assembly by enticing a large number of opposition GNP lawmakers to defect. Up to 25 GNP deputies left the party to join the governing coalition, after arm-twisting tactics by the government by launching corruption, campaign finance and tax audit investigations on them. The ULD and Kim Jong-pil subsequently left the coalition to join the opposition in January 2000, following disagreement with Kim's North Korea policy and the failure of the president to uphold his deal with Jong-pil to introduce a cabinet-style government.

Kim sought to nationalize his party's base and appeal and to introduce multi-member parliamentary constituencies with the ULD. Yet, Kim agreed with the GNP to implement a parallel voting system like in Japan, and the agreement collapsed amidst protests from civic groups. Thus the existing system was retained. In 1999, the Furgate scandal damaged Kim and his party's reputation. Also, in spite of his background as a democratic reformer, Kim was accused of spying on the opposition and being vindictive towards political opponents and even journalists critical of his government, such as strong-arm tactics against the opposition or reporters via politically motivated investigations. Kim's administration included more individuals from Jeolla, which led to charges of reverse discrimination. Many citizens, in the middle of his term, also did not feel that the economic recovery benefitted them. Finally, conservatives accused Kim of appeasing North Korea with his Sunshine Policy.

These factors, led to National Congress, now renamed the Millennium Democratic Party to suffer a setback as the party fell short behind the Grand National Party in the National Assembly during the 2000 South Korean legislative election. The decision to announce an inter-Korean summit 3 days before the election is said to have somewhat limited the governing party's losses as 79.6% of respondents in an opinion poll approved of the summit. Kim appointed Lee Han-dong, ULD president, as the new prime minister in a bid to mend fences and continue a governing majority against the GNP. Later, the ULD left the coalition for good in September 2001. ULD members sided with the GNP to pass a vote of no-confidence by 148 to 119 votes against key Cabinet member, Unification Minister Lim Dong-won, who was in charge of the Kim government's Sunshine Policy with North Korea. Kim effectively became a lame duck, and the political leverage that he had accumulated thanks to his summit diplomacy came to an abrupt end. Economic reform plans and engagement policies pursued by the administration simultaneously achieved mixed results until the end of his term one and a half years later.
