= 1983 K League =

Korean Super League
- Season: 1983
- Dates: 8 May – 25 September 1983
- Champions: Hallelujah FC (1st title)
- Matches played: 40
- Goals scored: 107 (2.68 per match)
- Best Player: Park Sung-hwa
- Top goalscorer: Park Yoon-ki (9 goals)
- Best goalkeeper: Cho Byung-deuk
- Highest scoring: Hallelujah 3–3 Yukong (14 May 1983); Daewoo 3–3 Hallelujah (26 June 1983); Yukong 2–4 POSCO (25 August 1983)
- Longest winning run: 3 matches POSCO Dolphins
- Longest unbeaten run: 7 matches Daewoo Royals; Hallelujah FC
- Longest winless run: 6 matches Kookmin Bank
- Longest losing run: 5 matches Kookmin Bank
- Total attendance: 419,478
- Average attendance: 20,974

The 1983 Korean Super League was the first ever season of the K League, the top football league in South Korea. A total of five teams participated in the league. Two of them were professional teams (Hallelujah FC and Yukong Elephants), and three of them were semi-professional teams (POSCO Dolphins, Daewoo Royals and Kookmin Bank). Each founding member had its mascot: eagle, elephant, dolphin, royal (crown) and magpie.

The season began on 8 May and ended on 25 September. It was played in two stages: the first stage was held in five cities (Seoul, Busan, Daegu, Jeonju, and Daejeon), and the second stage was held in nine cities (including Gwangju, Chuncheon, Masan, and Andong).

== Foreign players ==
Team	Player 1	Player 2
Daewoo Royals		
Hallelujah FC		
Kookmin Bank		
POSCO Dolphins	(Brazil) Roberto	(Brazil) Sergio
Yukong Elephants		

== League table ==
Pos	Team	Pld	W	D	L	GF	GA	GD	Pts
1	Hallelujah FC (C)	16	6	8	2	28	20	+8	20
2	Daewoo Royals	16	6	7	3	21	14	+7	19
3	Yukong Elephants	16	5	7	4	26	22	+4	17
4	POSCO Dolphins	16	6	4	6	21	21	0	16
5	Kookmin Bank	16	3	2	11	11	30	−19	8

Source: RSSSF
(C) Champions

== Positions by matchday ==
Team ╲ Round	1	2	3	4	5	6	7	8	9	10	11	12	13	14	15	16	17	18	19	20
Hallelujah FC	1	1	1	2	2	4	2	2	2	2	3	3	2	2	2	2	2	2	1	1
Daewoo Royals	1	4	2	3	1	1	1	1	1	1	1	1	1	1	1	1	1	1	2	2
Yukong Elephants	1	2	3	1	3	2	4	3	3	3	4	4	4	4	4	4	4	4	3	3
POSCO Dolphins	1	2	4	4	4	2	3	4	4	4	2	2	3	3	3	3	3	3	4	4
Kookmin Bank	5	5	5	5	5	5	5	5	5	5	5	5	5	5	5	5	5	5	5	5

Source: K League

== Results ==
8 May 1983 Seoul Series	Hallelujah FC	1–1	Yukong Elephants	Dongdaemun Stadium, Seoul
KST 15:30	Park Chang-sun 70'	Report	Park Yoon-ki 23'	Attendance: 22,420

8 May 1983 Seoul Series	Daewoo Royals	1–1	POSCO Dolphins	Dongdaemun Stadium, Seoul
KST 17:15	Lee Chun-seok 55'	Report	Lee Kil-yong 47'	Attendance: 22,420

9 May 1983 Seoul Series	Kookmin Bank	0–3	Hallelujah FC	Dongdaemun Stadium, Seoul
KST 14:00		Report	Park Sang-in 27', 34'; Park Sung-hwa 38'	Attendance: 11,630

9 May 1983 Seoul Series	POSCO Dolphins	1–1	Yukong Elephants	Dongdaemun Stadium, Seoul
KST 15:45	Lee Kil-yong 84'	Report	Kim Seok-won 4'	Attendance: 11,630

14 May 1983 Busan Series	Hallelujah FC	3–3	Yukong Elephants	Busan Gudeok Stadium, Busan
KST 15:00	Kim Hyun-bok 25'; Park Sung-hwa 40'; Oh Seok-jae 81'	Report	Park Yoon-ki 32', 75'; Kim Gang-nam 58'	Attendance: 23,472

14 May 1983 Busan Series	Kookmin Bank	0–2	Daewoo Royals	Busan Gudeok Stadium, Busan
KST 16:45		Report	Lee Tae-ho 13'; Lee Chun-seok 18'	Attendance: 23,472

15 May 1983 Busan Series	Yukong Elephants	1–0	Kookmin Bank	Busan Gudeok Stadium, Busan
KST 15:00	Shin Mun-seon 28'	Report		Attendance: 23,810

15 May 1983 Busan Series	POSCO Dolphins	1–1	Daewoo Royals	Busan Gudeok Stadium, Busan
KST 16:50	Lee Kil-yong 55'	Report	Lee Chun-seok 87'	Attendance: 23,810

22 May 1983 Daegu Series	Daewoo Royals	3–0	Kookmin Bank	Daegu Civic Stadium, Daegu
KST 14:30	Lee Chun-seok 21'; Byun Byung-joo 22'; Chung Hae-won 82'	Report		Attendance: 25,120

22 May 1983 Daegu Series	Hallelujah FC	2–2	POSCO Dolphins	Daegu Civic Stadium, Daegu
KST 16:30	Park Sung-hwa 34'; Kim Jung-hee 79'	Report	Choi Soon-ho 25'; Lee Kil-yong 65'	Attendance: 25,120

23 May 1983 Daegu Series	Yukong Elephants	0–0	Daewoo Royals	Daegu Civic Stadium, Daegu
KST 18:00		Report		Attendance: 22,199

23 May 1983 Daegu Series	POSCO Dolphins	1–0	Kookmin Bank	Daegu Civic Stadium, Daegu
KST 19:45	Choi Soon-ho 75'	Report		Attendance: 22,199

25 June 1983 Jeonju Series	Yukong Elephants	1–2	Daewoo Royals	Jeonju Sports Complex, Jeonju
KST 15:20	Kang Shin-woo 89' (o.g.)	Report	Lee Chun-seok 18'; Lee Tae-ho 59'	Attendance: 20,412

25 June 1983 Jeonju Series	Hallelujah FC	1–1	Kookmin Bank	Jeonju Sports Complex, Jeonju
KST 17:15	Lee Kang-seok 40'	Report	Kim Ki-hyo 66'	Attendance: 20,412

26 June 1983 Jeonju Series	Daewoo Royals	3–3	Hallelujah FC	Jeonju Sports Complex, Jeonju
KST 12:30	Chung Hae-won 3'; Lee Tae-ho 67'; Cho Kwang-rae 75'	Report	Kim Hyun-bok 38'; Oh Seok-jae 39'; Park Sang-in 73'	Attendance: 22,275

26 June 1983 Jeonju Series	Kookmin Bank	1–0	POSCO Dolphins	Jeonju Sports Complex, Jeonju
KST 14:30	Shin Dong-cheol 14'	Report		Attendance: 22,275

2 July 1983 Daejeon Series	Yukong Elephants	4–0	POSCO Dolphins	Daejeon Hanbat Stadium, Daejeon
KST 15:00	Lee Kang-jo 54'; Kim Yong-se 71'; Lee Jang-soo 76', 87'	Report		Attendance: 25,510

2 July 1983 Daejeon Series	Daewoo Royals	0–1	Hallelujah FC	Daejeon Hanbat Stadium, Daejeon
KST 16:50		Report	Oh Pil-hwan 23'	Attendance: 25,510

3 July 1983 Daejeon Series	Yukong Elephants	0–1	Kookmin Bank	Daejeon Hanbat Stadium, Daejeon
KST 14:30		Report	Lee Tae-hee 54' (pen.)	Attendance: 27,011

3 July 1983 Daejeon Series	Hallelujah FC	0–1	POSCO Dolphins	Daejeon Hanbat Stadium, Daejeon
KST 16:40		Report	Kim Hee-chul 22'	Attendance: 27,011

25 August 1983 Seoul Series 2	Yukong Elephants	2–4	POSCO Dolphins	Dongdaemun Stadium, Seoul
KST 17:00	Lee Jang-soo 7', 73'	Report	Kim Hee-chul 3', 74', 88'; Choi Sang-kuk 14'	Attendance: 21,046

25 August 1983 Seoul Series 2	Kookmin Bank	1–2	Daewoo Royals	Dongdaemun Stadium, Seoul
KST 19:20	Lee Bu-yeol 24'	Report	Chung Hae-won 34', 58'	Attendance: 21,046

27 August 1983 Andong Series	Hallelujah FC	2–2	Yukong Elephants	Andong Stadium, Andong
KST 14:00	Lee Jung-il 32', 82'	Report	Kim Seok-won 6'; Lee Kang-jo 57'	Attendance: 22,905

27 August 1983 Andong Series	POSCO Dolphins	4–0	Kookmin Bank	Andong Stadium, Andong
KST 16:25	Choi Sang-kuk 35'; Lee Kil-yong 61', 64'; Choi Chang-soo 76'	Report		Attendance: 22,905

31 August 1983 Daegu Series 2	Hallelujah FC	3–0	Kookmin Bank	Daegu Civic Stadium, Daegu
KST 17:00	Oh Seok-jae 65'; Park Sang-in 86'; Choi Jong-duk 89'	Report		Attendance: 15,888

31 August 1983 Daegu Series 2	POSCO Dolphins	0–2	Daewoo Royals	Daegu Civic Stadium, Daegu
KST 19:10		Report	Cho Kwang-rae 65'; Lee Chun-seok 75'	Attendance: 15,888

7 September 1983 Busan Series 2	Yukong Elephants	1–4	Kookmin Bank	Busan Gudeok Stadium, Busan
KST 17:00	Lee Jang-soo 38'	Report	Lim Seok-hyun 5', 39'; Kim Soo-kil 7', 66'	Attendance: 20,376

7 September 1983 Busan Series 2	Daewoo Royals	1–1	Hallelujah FC	Busan Gudeok Stadium, Busan
KST 19:00	Hyun Ki-ho 50'	Report	Lee Kang-seok 43'	Attendance: 20,376

10 September 1983 Gwangju Series	Kookmin Bank	1–1	Daewoo Royals	Gwangju Mudeung Stadium, Gwangju
KST 14:00	Kim Soo-gil 53'	Report	Lee Chun-seok 67'	Attendance: 22,252

10 September 1983 Gwangju Series	Yukong Elephants	2–0	POSCO Dolphins	Gwangju Mudeung Stadium, Gwangju
KST 16:10	Kim Seok-won 42'; Kim Hyung-nam 55' (o.g.)	Report		Attendance: 22,252

13 September 1983 Seoul Series 3	POSCO Dolphins	3–1	Kookmin Bank	Dongdaemun Stadium, Seoul
KST 17:00	Kim Hee-chul 8'; Kim Wan-soo 57', 75'	Report	Lee Tae-yeop 77'	Attendance: 10,007

13 September 1983 Seoul Series 3	Yukong Elephants	2–2	Hallelujah FC	Dongdaemun Stadium, Seoul
KST 18:45	Park Yoon-ki 25', 56'	Report	Park Chang-sun 8'; Kim Jung-hee 22'	Attendance: 10,007

17 September 1983 Chuncheon Series	POSCO Dolphins	0–1	Daewoo Royals	Chuncheon Civic Stadium, Chuncheon
KST 14:00		Report	Lee Chun-seok 5'	Attendance: 15,680

17 September 1983 Chuncheon Series	Hallelujah FC	1–0	Kookmin Bank	Chuncheon Civic Stadium, Chuncheon
KST 16:10	Oh Seok-jae 72'	Report		Attendance: 15,680

20 September 1983 Seoul Series 4	Yukong Elephants	2–1	Daewoo Royals	Dongdaemun Stadium, Seoul
KST 17:00	Kim Yong-se 10'; Park Yoon-ki 14'	Report	Min Byung-wook 69'	Attendance: 13,482

20 September 1983 Seoul Series 4	Hallelujah FC	2–3	POSCO Dolphins	Dongdaemun Stadium, Seoul
KST 18:45	Oh Pil-hwan 42'; Park Chang-sun 46'	Report	Cho Tae-chun 19'; Lee Kil-yong 23'; Kim Kyung-ho 51'	Attendance: 13,482

22 September 1983 Seoul Series 4	Hallelujah FC	2–1	Daewoo Royals	Dongdaemun Stadium, Seoul
KST 17:00	Oh Seok-jae 16'; Lee Jung-il 66'	Report	Yoo Tae-mok 46' (pen.)	Attendance: 21,366

22 September 1983 Seoul Series 4	Yukong Elephants	4–1	Kookmin Bank	Dongdaemun Stadium, Seoul
KST 19:00	Lee Jang-soo 37'; Park Yoon-ki 73', 83', 86'	Report	Lim Seok-hyun 51'	Attendance: 21,366

25 September 1983 Masan Series	Hallelujah FC	1–0	POSCO Dolphins	Masan Stadium, Masan
KST 14:00	Oh Seok-jae 80'	Report		Attendance: 32,617

25 September 1983 Masan Series	Yukong Elephants	0–0	Daewoo Royals	Masan Stadium, Masan
KST 15:45		Report		Attendance: 32,617

== Top scorers ==
Rank	Scorer	Club	Goals	Apps
1	(South Korea) Park Yoon-ki	Yukong Elephants	9	14
2	(South Korea) Lee Chun-seok	Daewoo Royals	8	16
3	(South Korea) Lee Kil-yong	POSCO Dolphins	7	13
4	(South Korea) Lee Jang-soo	Yukong Elephants	6	10
4	(South Korea) Oh Seok-jae	Hallelujah FC	6	16
6	(South Korea) Kim Hee-chul	POSCO Dolphins	5	13
7	(South Korea) Chung Hae-won	Daewoo Royals	4	13
7	(South Korea) Park Sang-in	Hallelujah FC	4	16

== Awards ==
=== Main awards ===
Award	Winner	Club
Most Valuable Player	(South Korea) Park Sung-hwa	Hallelujah FC
Top Goalscorer	(South Korea) Park Yoon-ki	Yukong Elephants
Top Assist Provider	(South Korea) Park Chang-sun	Hallelujah FC
Manager of the Year	(South Korea) Ham Heung-chul	Hallelujah FC
Best Goalkeeper	(South Korea) Cho Byung-deuk	Hallelujah FC
Exemplary Award	(South Korea) Lee Chun-seok	Daewoo Royals
Fighting Spirit Award	(South Korea) Lee Kang-jo	Yukong Elephants

=== Best XI ===
Position	Winner	Club
Goalkeeper	(South Korea) Cho Byung-deuk	Hallelujah FC
Defenders	(South Korea) Park Sung-hwa	Hallelujah FC
Defenders	(South Korea) Kim Chul-soo	POSCO Dolphins
Defenders	(South Korea) Chang Woe-ryong	Daewoo Royals
Defenders	(South Korea) Lee Kang-jo	Yukong Elephants
Midfielders	(South Korea) Cho Kwang-rae	Daewoo Royals
Midfielders	(South Korea) Park Chang-sun	Hallelujah FC
Forwards	(South Korea) Park Yoon-ki	Yukong Elephants
Forwards	(South Korea) Kim Yong-se	Yukong Elephants
Forwards	(South Korea) Lee Kil-yong	POSCO Dolphins
Forwards	(South Korea) Lee Chun-seok	Daewoo Royals
