= Cheil =

Cheil is the usual transliteration of the Korean word 제일. Meaning "best" and forming superlatives with other nouns, it is used in the names of several companies:

- Cheil Worldwide, a marketing company established in 1973 under the Samsung Group, headquartered in Seoul
- Cheil Industries, an affiliate of Samsung established in 1954 as a textile firm that expanded into fashion, chemicals and electronic chemical materials in the 1980s
- Cheil Industries FC, a defunct South Korean semi-professional football club located in Daegu
- CJ Group (씨제이㈜), from Cheil Jedang (제일 제당, "best sugar"), a South Korean conglomerate holding company headquartered in Seoul and separated from Samsung in the 1990s
  - CJ CheilJedang (씨제이제일제당), a food, pharmaceuticals and biotech company, headquartered in Seoul
  - CJ E&M (씨제이이앤엠 주식회사), an entertainment and media company, headquartered in Seoul
  - CJ CGV (씨제이 씨지브이㈜), the largest multiplex cinema chain in South Korea, with branches in China, Vietnam and the United States
