= Lee Kil-yong =

Lee Kil-yong (Korean: 이길용) is a Korean name consisting of the family name Lee and the given name Kil-yong. It may refer to:

- Lee Kil-yong (footballer, born 1959)
- Lee Kil-yong (footballer, born 1976)
