= 1966 National Semi-professional Football League (South Korea) =

National Semipro Football League
- Season: 1966
- Dates: Spring: 16 April – 1 May 1966; Autumn: 25 October – 13 November 1966
- Champions: Spring: Seoul Police Department (1st title); Autumn: Korea Tungsten (3rd title); Seoul Police Department (2nd title)

The 1966 National Semi-professional Football League (Korean: 1966년 전국실업축구연맹전) was the third season of the National Semi-professional Football League (South Korea). It was divided into spring season and autumn season.

== Spring season ==
=== Group stage ===
==== Group A ====
Pos	Team	Pld	W	D	L	GF	GA	GD	Pts	Qualification
1	Korea Tungsten	4	3	1	0	4	0	+4	7	Advance to knockout stage
2	Korea Coal Corporation	4	2	2	0	5	1	+4	6	Advance to knockout stage
3	Cheil Industries	4	2	0	2	3	3	0	4	
4	ROK Marine Corps	4	0	2	2	1	4	–3	2	
5	ROK Army Quartermaster Corps	4	0	1	3	0	5	–5	1	

==== Group B ====
Pos	Team	Pld	W	D	L	GF	GA	GD	Pts	Qualification
1	Seoul Police Department	4	2	2	0	3	1	+2	6	Advance to knockout stage
2	Korea Electric Power	4	2	1	1	6	2	+4	5	Advance to knockout stage
3	Keumsung Textile	4	1	2	1	3	2	+1	4	
4	ROK Army	4	2	0	2	4	5	–1	4	
5	National Railroad	4	0	1	3	0	6	–6	1	

=== Knockout stage ===
==== Semi-finals ====
30 April 1966

Korea Tungsten	1–2	Korea Electric Power
	Report

Seoul Stadium, Seoul

30 April 1966

Seoul Police Department	1–0	Korea Coal Corporation
	Report

Seoul Stadium, Seoul

==== Final ====
1 May 1966

Seoul Police Department	1–0	Korea Electric Power
Yoo Jong-lin 70'	Report

Seoul Stadium, Seoul

== Autumn season ==
=== Group stage ===
==== Group A ====
Pos	Team	Pld	W	D	L	GF	GA	GD	Pts	Qualification
1	Korea Coal Corporation	3	2	1	0	3	1	+2	5	Advance to final round
2	Seoul Police Department	3	1	1	1	5	4	+1	3	Advance to final round
3	ROK Marine Corps	3	1	0	2	3	4	–1	2	
4	ROK Army	3	0	2	1	3	5	–2	2	

==== Group B ====
Pos	Team	Pld	W	D	L	GF	GA	GD	Pts	Qualification
1	Korea Tungsten	4	3	0	1	8	1	+7	6	Advance to final round
2	ROK Army Quartermaster Corps	4	3	0	1	7	5	+2	6	Advance to final round
3	Keumsung Textile	4	2	0	2	7	6	+1	4	
4	Korea Electric Power	4	2	0	2	6	6	0	4	
5	National Railroad	4	0	0	4	4	14	–10	0	

=== Final round ===
The final round was held at Gwangju Mudeung Stadium.

Pos	Team	Pld	W	D	L	Pts
1	Korea Tungsten (C)	3	2	1	0	5
1	Seoul Police Department (C)	3	2	1	0	5
3	ROK Army Quartermaster Corps	3	1	1	1	3
4	Korea Coal Corporation	3	0	1	2	1
