= Chuncheon Songam Sports Town =

Stadium in South Korea

- Interactive map of Chuncheon Songam Sports Town
- Former names: Chuncheon Civic Stadium
- Location: 157 Songam-dong, Chuncheon, Gangwon-do, South Korea
- Coordinates: 37°51′21.87″N 127°41′27.79″E
- Owner: City of Chuncheon
- Operator: City of Chuncheon
- Capacity: 20,000
- Surface: Natural grass

Construction
- Groundbreaking: 2008
- Opened: 10 May 2009

Tenants
- Gangwon FC (2009–present); Chuncheon FC (2010–present)

Chuncheon Songam Sports Town is a sports complex in Chuncheon, South Korea. The former stadium was built in 1980 as Chuncheon Civic Stadium.

== Facilities ==
Songam Sports Town has a sports complex that accommodates 25,000 people, an 8,500-seat baseball stadium, 24 indoor and outdoor tennis courts, a Korean archery field with 21 units, and an ice rink and leisure facilities.

=== Chuncheon Songam Stadium ===
Newly established main stadium was opened in May 2009. It is used mostly for football matches. The stadium has a capacity for 20,000 spectators. It is home ground of Gangwon FC since June 2009.

== See also ==
- Chuncheon Civic Stadium
