= Park Yoon-ki =

South Korean footballer and manager

Park Yoon-Ki 박윤기
Personal information
- Full name: Park Yoon-Ki
- Date of birth: June 10, 1960 (age 66)
- Place of birth: Taebaek, Gangwon, South Korea
- Position: Forward

Senior career*
Years	Team	Apps	(Gls)
1979–1982	Seoul City FC (Amateur)		
1983–1986	Yukong Elephants	71	(19)
1987	Lucky-Goldstar Hwangso	13	(2)
1988	Mazda FC		

International career^{‡}
1979	South Korea U-20		

Managerial career
- 1991–1996: Seoul Technical High School
- 1994: South Korea U-20 (Coach)
- 1997–2002: Hansung University (Coach)
- 2003–2004: Gangneung Jeil High School
- 2004–2007: Seoul Technical High School
- 2008: Asan FC
- * Club domestic league appearances and goals as of 11 January 2008 ‡ National team caps and goals as of 11 January 2008

Park Yoon-Ki (Korean: 박윤기, in Taebaek, South Korea) is a former South Korean footballer.

He participated in the AFC Youth Championship in 1978, where South Korea U-20 team was the joint winner with the Iraq U-20 team. In the following year, he was a member of the South Korea U-20 team that competed in the 1979 FIFA World Youth Championship in Japan.

He played as a founding member of K-League side Yukong Elephants, and he played Lucky-Goldstar Hwangso in South Korea and one year at Japan regional leagues side Matzda FC.

He was a founding member of K-League, and he scored the league's first goal on May 8, 1983 against Hallelujah FC. In his first season, he was the best scorer by scoring 9 goals.

At the end of the 1986 season, he moved to Lucky-Goldstar Hwangso. At Lucky-Goldstar, he scored his last K-League goal and K-League's 1,000th goal. The following season he went to Matzda FC in Japan's regional league with Kang Shin-woo. One year later, he retired from professional football.

After retirement, he started his coaching career.

== Club career ==
- 1979-1982 Seoul City FC - amateur
- 1983-1986 Yukong Elephants
- 1987 Lucky-Goldstar Hwangso
- 1988 Matzda FC
