= 1964 National Semi-professional Football League (South Korea) =

National Semipro Football League
- Season: 1964
- Dates: Spring: 7–14 July 1964; Autumn: 10 October – 8 November 1964
- Champions: Spring: Keumsung Textile (1st title); Cheil Industries (1st title); Autumn: Keumsung Textile (2nd title)

The 1964 National Semi-professional Football League (Korean: 1964년 전국실업축구연맹전) was the first season of the National Semi-professional Football League (South Korea). It was divided into spring season and autumn season.

== Spring season ==
10 participating teams were divided into two groups, and each group winners advanced to the final.

=== Group stage ===
==== Group A ====
Pos	Team	Pld	W	D	L	GF	GA	GD	Pts	Qualification
1	Cheil Industries	4	3	1	0	7	2	+5	7	Advance to final
2	ROK Army Quartermaster Corps	4	1	2	1	3	3	0	4	
3	ROK Marine Corps	4	1	2	1	2	2	0	4	
4	Korea Coal Corporation	4	1	1	2	1	3	–2	3	
5	Korea Electric Power	4	0	2	2	3	6	–3	2	

==== Group B ====
Pos	Team	Pld	W	D	L	GF	GA	GD	Pts	Qualification
1	Keumsung Textile	4	3	1	0	4	0	+4	7	Advance to final
2	Korea Tungsten	4	2	1	1	4	3	+1	5	
3	Seoul Police Department	4	2	0	2	2	2	0	4	
4	ROK Army CIC	4	0	2	2	1	3	–2	2	
5	National Railroad	4	0	2	2	1	4	–3	2	

=== Final ===
Keumsung Textile and Cheil Industries shared the title after drawing in the final.

14 July 1964

Keumsung Textile	0–0	Cheil Industries
	Report

Seoul Stadium, Seoul
Attendance: 1,500

== Autumn season ==
7 participating teams played in a single league. Keumsung Textile won the title on goal difference.

Pos	Team	Pld	W	D	L	Pts
1	Keumsung Textile (C)	6	3	3	0	9
2	Korea Tungsten	6	3	3	0	9
3	Cheil Industries	6	3	2	1	8
4	ROK Army Quartermaster Corps	6	1	3	2	5
5	ROK Army CIC	6	1	3	2	5
6	National Railroad	6	1	2	3	4
7	ROK Marine Corps	6	0	2	4	2
