= Lee Jung-il =

South Korean footballer

Personal information
- Date of birth: 4 November 1956 (age 69)
- Place of birth: South Korea
- Position: Forward

Youth career
- Korea University

Senior career*
| Years | Team | Apps | (Gls) |
| 1979–1980 | Commercial Bank of Korea FC | | |

International career
| 1979–1980 | South Korea | 12 | |
- * Club domestic league appearances and goals

- Lee Jung-il
- Hangul: 이정일
- Hanja: 李正日
- RR: I Jeongil
- MR: I Chŏngil

Lee Jung-il (born November 4, 1956) is a Korean football forward who played for South Korea in the 1980 Asian Cup. He also played for Commercial Bank of Korea FC.

== International Record ==
| Year | Apps | Goal |
|---|---|---|
| 1979 | 1 | 0 |
| 1980 | 11 | 1 |
| Total | 12 | 1 |
