= Best Eleven =

South Korean football magazine

- Cover of the June 2025 issue
- Categories: Football magazine
- Frequency: Monthly
- First issue: April 1970
- Country: South Korea
- Language: Korean
- Website: besteleven.co.kr//

Best Eleven (Korean: 베스트일레븐) is the oldest monthly football magazine in South Korea. The first edition was published in April 1970. At that time, the magazine's name was Monthly Football. In April 1996, the name was changed to Best Eleven.
