= Suwonbuk Middle School =

- 수원북중학교
- Jangan-gu, Suwon; South Korea

Information
- Type: Public
- Motto: Faithfulness
- Established: 1 September 1951
- Authority: Gyeonggi-do Office of Education
- Principal: Shin Dong-chun (신동천)
- Faculty: 129 (as of 2010)
- Grades: 7–9
- Enrollment: 1,023 (as of 2010)
- Tree: Ginkgo biloba
- Flower: Rose
- Animal: Lion
- Website: suwonbuk.ms.kr

Suwonbuk Middle School (Korean: 수원북중학교; Hanja: 水原北中學校) is a middle school located in Suwon, South Korea. As of 2010, the school had 1,023 students enrolled. The school was established on 8 June 1936 and opened on 1 September 1951.

== Notable alumni ==
- Oh Hyun-kyu, conductor

== As a filming location ==
The school was used in the 2003 film The Classic, and 2007 TV series Lucifer.
