= 1965 National Semi-professional Football League (South Korea) =

National Semipro Football League
- Season: 1965
- Dates: Spring: 4 April – 23 May 1965; Autumn: 13–28 October 1965
- Champions: Spring: Keumsung Textile (3rd title); Korea Electric Power (1st title); Korea Tungsten (1st title); Autumn: Korea Tungsten (2nd title)

The 1965 National Semi-professional Football League (Korean: 1965년 전국실업축구연맹전) was the second season of the National Semi-professional Football League (South Korea). It was divided into spring season and autumn season.

== Spring season ==
Three teams shared the spring season title.

Pos	Team	Pld	W	D	L	Pts
1	Keumsung Textile (C)	7	4	2	1	10
1	Korea Electric Power (C)	7	4	2	1	10
1	Korea Tungsten (C)	7	4	2	1	10
4	Korea Coal Corporation	7	3	2	2	8
4	Seoul Police Department	7	2	4	1	8
6	ROK Marine Corps	7	1	2	4	4
7	ROK Army Quartermaster Corps	7	1	1	5	3
7	National Railroad	7	1	1	5	3

== Autumn season ==
Pos	Team	Pld	W	D	L	Pts
1	Korea Tungsten (C)	7	4	3	0	11
2	Korea Coal Corporation	7	4	2	1	10
3	Korea Electric Power	7	4	1	2	9
4	Keumsung Textile	7	4	0	3	8
5	ROK Army Quartermaster Corps	7	2	2	3	6
5	ROK Marine Corps	7	2	2	3	6
7	Seoul Police Department	7	2	2	3	6
8	National Railroad	7	0	0	7	0
