= Furgate =

1990s South Korean corruption scandal

- Native name: 옷로비 사건
- Date: Late 1990s
- Location: South Korea
- Also known as: Clothes bribery scandal
- Type: Bribery
- Participants: Senior South Korean government figures and their wives
- Outcome: $165 million loss
- Arrests: Multiple
- Convicted: Multiple

Furgate (Korean: 옷로비 사건; RR: onnobi sageon), also known as the clothes bribery scandal, or the clothes-for-lobbying scandal, refers to the late-1990s corruption and scandal involving senior South Korean government figures and their wives, who took bribes and spent the proceeds on luxury items, primarily furs and jewelry. The resulting scandal and trial that began in 1999 and ended in 2000. Since the 1990s it has been described in South Korea as one of the largest scandals ever. Estimated loss from bribery and corruption related to the Furgate scandal was approximately $165 million.

== History ==
The scandal surfaced in South Korea in May 1999 while prosecutors were investigating corruption charges related to the Shin Dong Ah company. Luxury items were used by wives of businessmen under investigation for corruption to gain favors of the wives of senior Korean politicians and judicial officials, in order to have those wives persuade their husbands towards leniency. The investigation into the scandal led to the first ever appointment of a special prosecutor in South Korea judicial history. Two ministers resigned over the scandal; a former Minister of Justice and a former presidential legal secretary were among the individuals arrested during the investigation. Individuals sentenced in the scandal included the wives of a former unification minister and of a former prosecutor general, found guilty of perjury before the Korean parliament (National Assembly).

== Impact ==
The scandal was revealed in the midst of the Korean economic crisis related to the 1997 Asian financial crisis, and led to moral outrage. The scandal damaged the reputation of Korean president Kim Dae-jung and his party (the Democratic Party), particularly when further information was revealed to suggest that the prosecutor office attempted to cover up the scandal.
