= Lee Kil-yong (footballer, born 1959) =

South Korean footballer

Lee Kil-Yong 이길용
Personal information
- Full name: Lee Kil-Yong
- Date of birth: September 29, 1959 (age 67)
- Place of birth: South Korea
- Height: 1.72 m (5 ft 7 1/2 in)
- Position: Forward

Youth career
- Korea University

Senior career*
Years	Team	Apps	(Gls)
1983–1989	POSCO Atoms	83	(16)

International career
1979	South Korea U-20	2	(0)
1983–1984	South Korea	11	(2)

Managerial career
- 1990–?: POSCO Atoms Reserves (coach)
- Shinhan High School: 2000-2003
- * Club domestic league appearances and goals

- Lee Kil-yong
- Hangul: 이길용
- RR: I Gilyong
- MR: I Kiryong

Lee Kil-Yong (Korean: 이길용; born September 29, 1959) is a South Korean former footballer who played as a forward.

He started professional career at POSCO Atoms in 1983. He was squad of South Korea national under-20 football team in 1979 FIFA World Youth Championship.
