= Chuncheon Civic Stadium =

Stadium in Gangwon-do, South Korea

Coordinates: 37°52′09″N 127°43′05″E

Chuncheon Stadium
- Interactive map of Chuncheon Stadium
- Location: Onui-dong, Chuncheon, Gangwon-do, South Korea
- Owner: City of Chuncheon
- Operator: City of Chuncheon
- Capacity: 35,000
- Surface: Natural grass

Construction
- Opened: 1980
- Demolished: 2008

Tenant
- Hyundai Horang-i (1987–1989)

Chuncheon Stadium (Korean: 춘천종합운동장) was a multi-purpose stadium located in Chuncheon, Gangwon-do, South Korea. It was built in 1980 to hold Korean Junior Sports Festival. It also held Korean National Sports Festival twice, in 1985 and 1996. The stadium had a capacity of 35,000 people. In December 2008, because of the deterioration of its equipment, the stadium was demolished, and a new stadium, Chuncheon Stadium, was built in another place.

== See also ==
- Chuncheon Songam Sports Town
