= Lee Chun-seok =

South Korean footballer (1959–2024)

Lee Chun-Seok 이춘석
Personal information
- Date of birth: February 3, 1959
- Place of birth: South Korea
- Date of death: June 3, 2024 (aged 65)
- Height: 1.77 m (5 ft 10 in)
- Position: Forward

Youth career
- Yonsei University

Senior career*
Years	Team	Apps	(Gls)
1983	Daewoo Royals	16	(8)
1985	→ Sangmu (army)	19	(5)
1986–1987	Daewoo Royals	26	(3)

Managerial career
- 1988–1989: Yonsei University (coach)
- 1990–1992: Daewoo Royals reserves
- 1993–1994: Daewoo Royals (assistant)
- 1995–1996: Geoje High School
- 1997–2003: Anyang LG Cheetahs (assistant)
- 2004–2005: South Korea (coach)
- 2009–: Daewol Middle School
- * Club domestic league appearances and goals

Lee Chun-Seok (Korean: 이춘석, February 3, 1959 – June 3, 2024) was a South Korean footballer who played as a forward in the K-League for the Daewoo Royals. He died on June 3, 2024, at the age of 65.

== Honours ==
K-League Best XI: 1983
