= Cheil Industries FC =

1962–1971 South Korean football club

Cheil Industries
- Full name: Cheil Industries FC 제일모직 축구단
- Founded: 1962
- Dissolved: 1971

Cheil Industries FC is a defunct South Korean semi-professional football club that was located in Daegu, South Korea. The club played at the highest level in South Korea in the 1960s, winning the national league on three occasions and the national cup twice.

== Background ==
Cheil Industries FC was founded in April 1962 by Cheil Industries of Samsung Group, and was based in Daegu in south-eastern Korea. The club competed in the Korea Semi-Professional Football League which at that time was the highest level league in the South Korean football league system. Many works, banks and military sides competed in the league which was run with Spring and Autumn stages each year. League records indicate that Cheil Industries shared the title in Spring 1964 after winning Group A and then drawing 0–0 with Keumseong Textile Company FC in the final at the Dongdaemun Stadium, Seoul on the 14 July 1964.

The club were also joint winners in Autumn 1968, this time with Army Logistics Command FC, and finished runners-up in Autumn 1967. They finally won the competition outright in Spring 1970 a year before the club disbanded. The club won the national cup competition, the Korean National Football Championship, in 1966 and 1967. The club also won the Korean President's Cup National Football Tournament in 1963 and 1967 and were runners-up in 1968.

The club was disbanded in December 1971 but during its short 9-year history it was one of the leading sides in South Korea, featuring players such as Kim Ho, Moon Jung-sik and Park Byung-joo. In 1964 Cheil Industries provided three players, Kim Hong-bok, Cha Tae-sung and Lee Yi-woo, for the South Korea Olympics squad in Tokyo. Other Cheil Industries players that represented their country were Chung Soon-choon, Lee Joon-ok, Seo Yoon-cha, An Won-nam and Hong In-woong. The club was affiliated to the Korea Football Association.

== Honours ==
- Korea Semi-Professional Football League:
  - Champions (3): 1964s, 1968a, 1970s
  - Runners-up (1): 1967a
- Korean National Football Championship (Former FA Cup):
  - Champions (2): 1966, 1967
- Korean President's Cup National Football Tournament:
  - Champions (2): 1963, 1967
  - Runners-up (1): 1968

== Notable players ==
Cheil Industries FC players that have played in the South Korea national team include:

- An Won-nam
- Cha Tae-sung
- Chung Soon-choon
- Hong In-woong
- Kim Jae-han
- Kim Ho
- Kim Hong-bok
- Lee Joon-ok
- Lee Yi-woo
- Moon Jung-sik
- Park Byung-joo
- Seo Yoon-cha

== See also ==
- List of South Korean football champions
- List of Korean FA Cup winners
