= Hallelujah FC =

1980–1998 South Korean football club

Hallelujah 할렐루야
- Full name: Hallelujah Football Club 할렐루야 축구단
- Nickname: Eagles
- Founded: 20 December 1980
- Dissolved: 1998; 28 years ago

Hallelujah FC is a defunct South Korean football club. The club was officially founded on 20 December 1980 as the first professional football club in South Korea.

== History ==
Hallelujah FC was founded in 1980 by Choi Soon-Young, then president of the Korea Football Association. It consisted of Christian (Catholic or Protestant) footballers and coaches. Hallelujah FC won the inaugural Korea Super League title in 1983. After 1985, Hallelujah FC became an amateur club dedicated to missionary work.

Hallelujah FC was dissolved in August 1998 due to the Asian financial crisis.

== Honours ==
=== Domestic competitions ===
==== League ====
- K League Classic
  - Winners (1): 1983

==== Cups ====
- National Football Championship
  - Runners-up (5): 1991, 1994, 1995, 1997, 1998
- President's Cup
  - Winners (1): 1988
  - Runners-up (1): 1994

=== International/Invitational ===
- Queen's Cup
  - Winners (1): 2009

== Notable players ==
- Park Sang-in
- Lee Young-woo
- Choi Jong-duk

== See also ==
- Goyang Hi FC
