= 1984 Daewoo Royals season =

Daewoo Royals
1984 season
- Manager: Cho Yoon-Ok
- KSL: Champions
- Top goalscorer: League: Lee Tae-Ho (11); All: Lee Tae-Ho (11)

The 1984 season was Daewoo Royals' second season in the Korean Super League in South Korea. Daewoo Royals competed in League.

== Players ==
=== Squad ===
Note: Flags indicate national team as defined under FIFA eligibility rules; some limited exceptions apply. Players may hold more than one non-FIFA nationality.

No.	Pos.	Nation	Player
1	GK	KOR	Kim Poong-Joo
2	GK	KOR	Jeong Seong-Gyo
3	MF	KOR	Cho Kwang-Rae
4	DF	KOR	Chang Woe-Ryong
6	DF	KOR	Kim Tae-Su
8	FW	KOR	Kang Shin-Woo
10	MF	KOR	Lee Tae-Ho
11	FW	KOR	Chung Hae-Won
12	DF	KOR	Chung Yong-Hwan
13	MF	KOR	Hyun Ki-Ho
16	DF	KOR	Lee Jae-Hee
17	FW	KOR	Byun Byung-Joo
18	MF	KOR	Lee Cheon-Heung

No.	Pos.	Nation	Player
19	FW	KOR	Park Jong-Won
21	MF	KOR	Yoo Jong-Wan
22	DF	KOR	Yoo Tae-Mok
24	FW	KOR	Lee Woo-Chan
25	DF	KOR	Jeon Deok-Chan
27	MF	KOR	Kim Ki-Yoon
—	FW	KOR	Park Yong-Ju
—	MF	KOR	Kim Gang-Nam
—	MF	KOR	Kim Seong-Nam
—	MF	KOR	Park Chang-Seon
—	MF	KOR	Jeong Jong-Sik
—	DF	KOR	Jeon In-Seok
—	FW	KOR	Im Go-Seok

=== Squad stats ===
No.	Nat.	Pos.	Name	Korean Name	League		Total	
No.	Nat.	Pos.	Name	Korean Name	Apps	Goals	Apps	Goals
1	(South Korea)	GK	Kim Poong-Joo	김풍주	17 (0)	0	17	0
2	(South Korea)	GK	Jeong Seong-Gyo	정성교	11 (0)	0	11	0
3	(South Korea)	MF	Cho Kwang-Rae	조광래	11 (2)	1	13	1
4	(South Korea)	DF	Chang Woe-Ryong	장외룡	18 (0)	0	18	0
6	(South Korea)	DF	Kim Tae-Su	김태수	2 (5)	0	7	0
8	(South Korea)	FW	Kang Shin-Woo	강신우	22 (5)	5	27	5
10	(South Korea)	MF	Lee Tae-Ho	이태호	20 (0)	11	20	11
11	(South Korea)	FW	Chung Hae-Won	정해원	23 (0)	5	23	5
12	(South Korea)	DF	Chung Yong-Hwan	정용환	22 (0)	0	22	0
13	(South Korea)	MF	Hyun Ki-Ho	현기호	16 (2)	1	18	1
16	(South Korea)	DF	Lee Jae-Hee	이재희	28 (0)	0	28	0
17	(South Korea)	FW	Byun Byung-Joo	변병주	15 (4)	4	19	4
18	(South Korea)	MF	Lee Cheon-Heung	이천흥	6 (4)	0	10	0
19	(South Korea)	FW	Park Jong-Won	박종원	6 (3)	1	9	1
21	(South Korea)	MF	Yoo Jong-Wan	유종완	2 (0)	0	2	0
22	(South Korea)	DF	Yoo Tae-Mok	유태목	21 (1)	2	22	2
24	(South Korea)	FW	Lee Woo-Chan	이우찬	0 (2)	0	2	0
25	(South Korea)	DF	Jeon Deok-Chan	전덕찬	0 (1)	0	1	0
27	(South Korea)	MF	Kim Ki-Yoon	김기윤	12 (3)	4	15	4
	(South Korea)	MF	Park Chang-Seon	박창선	28 (0)	6	28	6
	(South Korea)	FW	Im Go-Seok	임고석	5 (6)	4	11	4
	(South Korea)	FW	Park Yong-Ju	박용주	3 (1)	0	4	0
	(South Korea)	MF	Kim Gang-Nam	김강남	2 (1)	0	3	0
	(South Korea)	MF	Kim Seong-Nam	김성남	2 (4)	0	6	0
	(South Korea)	MF	Jeong Jong-Sik	정종식	0 (1)	0	1	0
	(South Korea)	DF	Jeon In-Seok	전인석	17 (1)	0	18	0

== Competition ==
=== Korean Super League ===
==== First stage ====
Pos	Team	Pld	W	D	0D	L	GF	GA	GD	Pts	Qualification
1	Yukong Elephants	14	9	2	0	3	21	9	+12	31	Qualification for the playoffs
2	Daewoo Royals	14	9	1	1	3	24	15	+9	30	
3	Hyundai Horang-i	14	6	4	2	2	21	9	+12	28	
4	Hallelujah FC	14	5	3	1	5	16	18	−2	22	
5	Lucky-Goldstar Hwangso	14	5	1	2	6	20	22	−2	19	

Source: RSSSF

==== Second stage ====
Pos	Team	Pld	W	D	0D	L	GF	GA	GD	Pts	Qualification
1	Daewoo Royals	14	8	1	3	2	23	8	+15	29	Qualification for the playoffs
2	Hyundai Horang-i	14	7	3	1	3	29	20	+9	28	
3	POSCO Dolphins	14	7	2	0	5	28	27	+1	25	
4	Hallelujah FC	14	5	3	2	4	18	17	+1	23	
5	Yukong Elephants	14	4	3	4	3	17	13	+4	22	

Source: RSSSF

==== Championship playoffs ====
First Leg

November 10

Yukong Elephants	0–1	Daewoo Royals

Dongdaemun Stadium, Seoul

Second Leg

November 11

Daewoo Royals	1–1	Yukong Elephants

Dongdaemun Stadium, Seoul

== Matches ==
M	Date	Tournament	Round	Opponent	Ground	Result^{1}	Scorers	Attendance	Pos
1	03-31	KSL 1st stage	1	Hanil Bank	Dongdaemun	2–0	Yoo Tae-Mok 29', 78'(pen)	19,000	
2	04-07	KSL 1st stage	2	Kookmin Bank	Busan	2–1	Im Go-Seok 40', Park Jong-Won 87'	12,000	
3	04-21	KSL 1st stage	3	POSCO	Dongdaemun	1–0	Im Go-Seok 26'	13,023	
4	04-28	KSL 1st stage	4	Hallelujah	Daejeon	1–2	Park Chang-Seon 56'	8,000	
5	05-05	KSL 1st stage	5	Hyundai	Cheongju	0–0		17,000	
6	05-12	KSL 1st stage	6	Lucky-Goldstar	Wonju	4–5	Own goal 61', Im Go-Seok 82', 90', Byun Byung-Joo 89'	12,767	
7	05-20	KSL 1st stage	7	Hanil Bank	Ulsan	1–0	Lee Tae-Ho 62'	24,587	
8	06-17	KSL 1st stage	8	Yukong	Jeonju	1–2	Hyun Ki-Ho 12'	11,608	
9	06-23	KSL 1st stage	9	Yukong	Gwangju	1–0	Chung Hae-Won	9,200	
10	06-28	KSL 1st stage	10	Hallelujah	Busan	1–1	Own goal 85'	7,000	
11	07-01	KSL 1st stage	11	Hyundai	Busan	1–0	Lee Tae-Ho 29'	14,280	
12	07-08	KSL 1st stage	12	POSCO	Hyochang	2–1	Lee Tae-Ho 14', 59'	10,602	
13	07-15	KSL 1st stage	13	Kookmin Bank	Gangneung	3–2	Kim Ki-Yoon 34', Chung Hae-Won 51', Lee Tae-Ho 72'	18,305	
14	07-22	KSL 1st stage	14	Lucky-Goldstar	Busan	4–1	Chung Hae-Won 15', 19', 65'(pen), Kim Ki-Yoon 20'	5,364	
15	07-28	KSL 2nd stage	1	Hanil Bank	Dongdaemun	3–1	Lee Tae-Ho 15', 41', 77'	6,000	
16	08-01	KSL 2nd stage	2	Kookmin Bank	Hyochang	4–0	Kim Ki-Yoon 26', 78', Byun Byung-Joo 66', Lee Tae-Ho 75'	3,000	
17	08-04	KSL 2nd stage	3	Yukong	Dongdaemun	0–0		5,000	
18	08-07	KSL 2nd stage	4	Hallelujah	Hyochang	1–0	Park Chang-Seon 74'	1,000	
19	08-11	KSL 2nd stage	5	Hyundai	Gangneung	0–1		2,000	
20	08-17	KSL 2nd stage	6	POSCO	Busan	1–2	Park Chang-Seon 44'	4,000	
21	08-25	KSL 2nd stage	7	Lucky-Goldstar	Ulsan	2–0	Kang Shin-Woo 23', 49'	8,000	
22	08-30	KSL 2nd stage	8	Hanil Bank	Daegu	3–1	Byun Byung-Joo 49', Lee Tae-Ho 52'(pen), Park Chang-Seon 69'	4,179	
23	09-02	KSL 2nd stage	9	Kookmin Bank	Andong	1–1	Kang Shin-Woo 75'	8,976	
24	09-09	KSL 2nd stage	10	Yukong	Masan	0–0		6,130	
25	09-16	KSL 2nd stage	11	Hallelujah	Gwangju	3–0	Park Chang-Seon 40', Byun Byung-Joo 42', Kang Shin-Woo 70'	4,083	
26	09-23	KSL 2nd stage	12	Hyundai	Incheon	0–0		15,514	
27	10-28	KSL 2nd stage	13	POSCO	Cheongju	4–2	Cho Kwang-Rae 42', Park Chang-Seon 49', Lee Tae-Ho 60', Kang Shin-Woo 77'	5,607	
28	11-04	KSL 2nd stage	14	Lucky-Goldstar	Dongdaemun	1–0	Own goal 53'	6,000	
29	11-10	Championship PO	1st leg	Yukong	Dongdaemun	1–0	Park Chang-Seon 41'		
30	11-11	Championship PO	2nd leg	Yukong	Dongdaemun	1–1	Chung Hae-Won 63'		

Source : K-League
KSL : Korean Super League
^{1}Daewoo Royals goals come first.
