= 1996–2005 Puchon Yukong / Bucheon SK seasons =

South Korean football club seasons

At the end of 1995 the side moved from the Dongdaemun Stadium in Seoul to the Mokdong Stadium on the western edge of Seoul, as part of K-League's decentralization policy.

Three clubs based in Seoul – the Yukong Elephants, LG Cheetahs, and Ilhwa Chunma – did not accept this policy, so the Seoul government gave an eviction order to the three clubs. However they guaranteed that if clubs built a soccer-specific stadium in Seoul, they could have a Seoul franchise and return to Seoul. As a result, the three clubs were evicted from Seoul to other cities. The Yukong Elephants moved to the city of Bucheon, a satellite city of Seoul, (25 km away). Mid-way through the 1997 season, the club re-branded itself as Bucheon SK. Because the city of Bucheon did not have a stadium, they used Mokdong Stadium in Seoul until 2000. At the start of the 2001 season, the team moved to the 35,545 seat Bucheon Leports Complex.

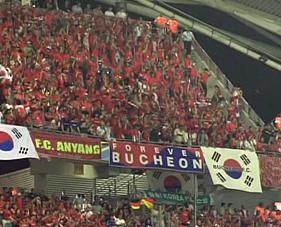
A Forever Bucheon banner, displayed by fans of the movement to create the new Bucheon Club at a 2006 FIFA World Cup match between South Korea and France, June 18, 2006

== Jeju United FC (Bucheon Yukong / Bucheon SK) seasons 1996-2005 statistics ==
Season	K-League	Played	W	D	L	F	A	PTS	League Cup	FA Cup	Manager
1996	4th	32	13	9	10	55	51	48	Winner	Semi Final	Valeri Nepomniachi
1997	10th	18	2	5	11	19	36	11	5th	Quarter Final	Valeri Nepomniachi
1998	7th	18	9	0	9	28	28	24	Runners-up	First Round	Valeri Nepomniachi
1999	3rd	29	18	0	11	48	41	47	5th	Quarter Final	Cho Yoon-Hwan
2000	Runners-up	32	18	0	14	54	45	41	Winner	Semi Final	Cho Yoon-Hwan
2001	7th	27	7	14	6	29	29	35	10th	Second Round	Cho Yoon-Hwan / Choi Yun-Gyeom
2002	8th	27	8	8	11	32	40	32	5th	Round of 16	Choi Yun-Gyeom / Tınaz Tırpan
2003	12th	44	3	12	29	39	73	21		Semi Final	Tınaz Tırpan / Ha Jae-Hoon
2004	13th	24	4	13	7	19	27	25	11th	Runners-up	Jung Hae-Seong
2005	5th	24	12	6	6	26	18	42	4th	Round of 16	Jung Hae-Seong
