= 2006 Jeju United FC season =

2006 Season is first year of new franchise Jeju

Jeju United FC season 2006 statistics

Season	K-League	Played	W	D	L	F	A	PTS	K-League Cup	FA Cup	Manager
2006	13th	26	5	10	11	23	30	25	8th	Round of 32	Jung Hae-Seong
