= Jae-hoon =

- Hangul: 재훈
- RR: Jaehun
- MR: Chaehun

Jae-hoon is a Korean given name. Notable people with the name include:

- Ahn Jae-hoon (born 1988), South Korean footballer
- Ha Jae-hoon (baseball) (born 1990), South Korean professional baseball player
- Ha Jae-hoon (footballer, born 1965) (born 1965), South Korea football player
- Ha Jae-hoon (footballer, born 1984) (born 1984), South Korean football player
- Jung Jae-hoon (born 1980), South Korean baseball pitcher
- Kim Jae-hoon (born 1988), South Korean footballer
- Lee Jae-hoon (athlete) (born 1976), South Korean middle-distance runner
- Lee Jae-hoon (singer) (born 1974), South Korean singer and television personality
- Tak Jae-hoon (born 1968), South Korean singer, actor and entertainer
- Yoo Jae-hoon (born 1984), Korean professional footballer

== See also ==
- Choi Jae-hoon (최제훈; born 1973), South Korean writer
