= Ha Jae-hoon =

Ha Jae-hoon may refer to:

- Ha Jae-hoon (footballer, born 1965), South Korean footballer who played for Yukong
- Ha Jae-hoon (footballer, born 1984), South Korean footballer who played for Gangwon FC
- Ha Jae-hoon (baseball) (born 1990), South Korean baseball player
