= Park Jong-won =

- Hangul: 박종원
- RR: Bak Jongwon
- MR: Pak Chongwŏn

Park Jong-won is a Korean name consisting of the family name Park and the given name Jong-won. It may refer to:

- Park Jong-won (director) (born 1960), South Korean film director and screenwriter
- Park Jong-won (footballer) (born 1955), South Korean footballer
