= Park Hang-seo =

South Korean footballer and manager

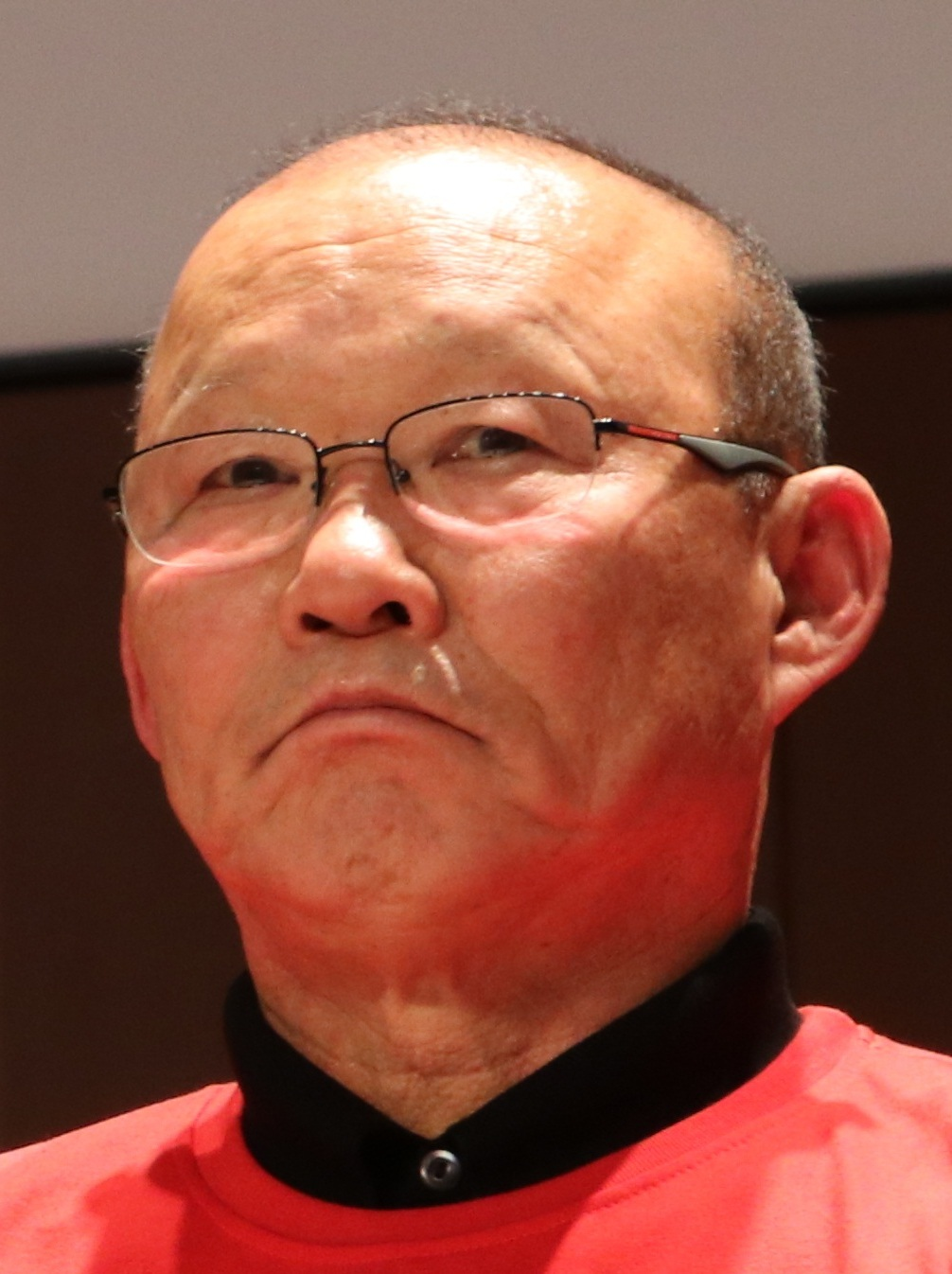
- Park in 2018

Personal information
- Full name: Park Hang-seo
- Date of birth: 1 October 1959 (age 67)
- Place of birth: Sancheong, Gyeongnam, South Korea
- Height: 1.65 m (5 ft 5 in)
- Position: Midfielder

Team information
- Current team: Kanchanaburi Power (head coach)

College career
Years	Team	Apps	(Gls)
1977–1980	Hanyang University		

Senior career*
Years	Team	Apps	(Gls)
1981	Korea First Bank		
1981–1983	ROK Army (draft)		
1984–1988	Lucky-Goldstar Hwangso	99	(15)

International career
1977–1978	South Korea U20		
1979–1980	South Korea B		
1981	South Korea	1	(0)

Managerial career
- 1996: Anyang LG Cheetahs (caretaker)
- 2000–2002: South Korea (assistant)
- 2002: South Korea U23
- 2005–2007: Gyeongnam FC
- 2008–2010: Jeonnam Dragons
- 2012–2015: Sangju Sangmu
- 2017: Changwon City
- 2017–2022: Vietnam U23
- 2017–2023: Vietnam
- 2026–: Kanchanaburi Power
Medal record
Men's football
Representing South Korea (as player)
AFC Youth Championship
Winner	1978 Bangladesh
Representing South Korea (as manager)
Asian Games
Bronze medal – third place	2002 Busan
Representing Vietnam (as manager)
AFC U-23 Championship
Runner-up	2018 China
AFF Championship
Winner	2018
Runner-up	2022
SEA Games
Gold medal – first place	2019 Philippines
Gold medal – first place	2021 Vietnam
- * Club domestic league appearances and goals

- Park Hang-seo
- Hangul: 박항서
- Hanja: 朴恒緖
- RR: Bak Hangseo
- MR: Pak Hangsŏ

Park Hang-seo (Korean: 박항서; Hanja: 朴恒緖; born 1 October 1959) is a South Korean football manager and former player, who is the head coach of Thai League 2 club Kanchanaburi Power.

== Playing career ==
Park was the captain of the South Korea under-20 squad which won the 1978 AFC Youth Championship.

On 8 March 1981, Park made his senior international debut in a 1–0 victory against Japan.

Park performed his mandatory military service in the football club of ROK Army after he joined the semi-professional club Korea First Bank.

From 1984 to 1988, Park played for Lucky-Goldstar Hwangso, and contributed to the 1985 K League title. He received the K League Best XI award in that season.

== Coaching career ==
After his retirement as a player, Park started a coaching career at Lucky-Goldstar Hwangso in 1989. In November 1996, he was appointed a caretaker manager and was in charge of one match in the 1996 Korean FA Cup.

From 1997 to February 2000, Park was a coach of Suwon Samsung Bluewings.

Park was one of the two assistant managers of Guus Hiddink at the 2002 FIFA World Cup.

== Managerial career ==
=== South Korea U23 ===
In August 2002, Park was appointed as manager of the South Korean side for the 2002 Asian Games by performing successfully as the senior team assistant. However, Korea Football Association (KFA) hadn't done any preparation for the 2002 Asian Games since there was no manager or coaching staff for 2 years. KFA had focused on the 2002 FIFA World Cup, which was co-hosted in South Korea, so Park had to prepare for the tournament in 2 months. In addition, KFA was criticized that Park worked without getting paid because they formally didn't sign with him. South Korea lost to Iran on penalties in the semi-finals, but won the bronze medal. Park was sacked after the tournament.

=== Clubs in South Korea ===
In August 2005, Park became the inaugural manager of the newly-formed Gyeongnam FC in the K League. Gyeongnam finished fourth in the 2007 K League season, but Park left the team due to internal conflict.

In December 2007, Park succeeded Huh Jung-moo as the manager of Jeonnam Dragons. The team finished as the runners-up of the 2008 League Cup and sixth in the 2009 K League. He later resigned due to poor performances in the 2010 season.

From 2012 to 2015, Park managed the military team Sangju Sangmu in South Korea. Under his guidance, his squad won the country's second-division league, K League Challenge, in 2013 and 2015. He left the team after his contract expired after the 2015 season.

In 2017, Park was appointed manager of Changwon City, a third-division team. Changwon won the 2017 Korea National League Championship, and he was named the tournament's best manager.

=== Vietnam ===
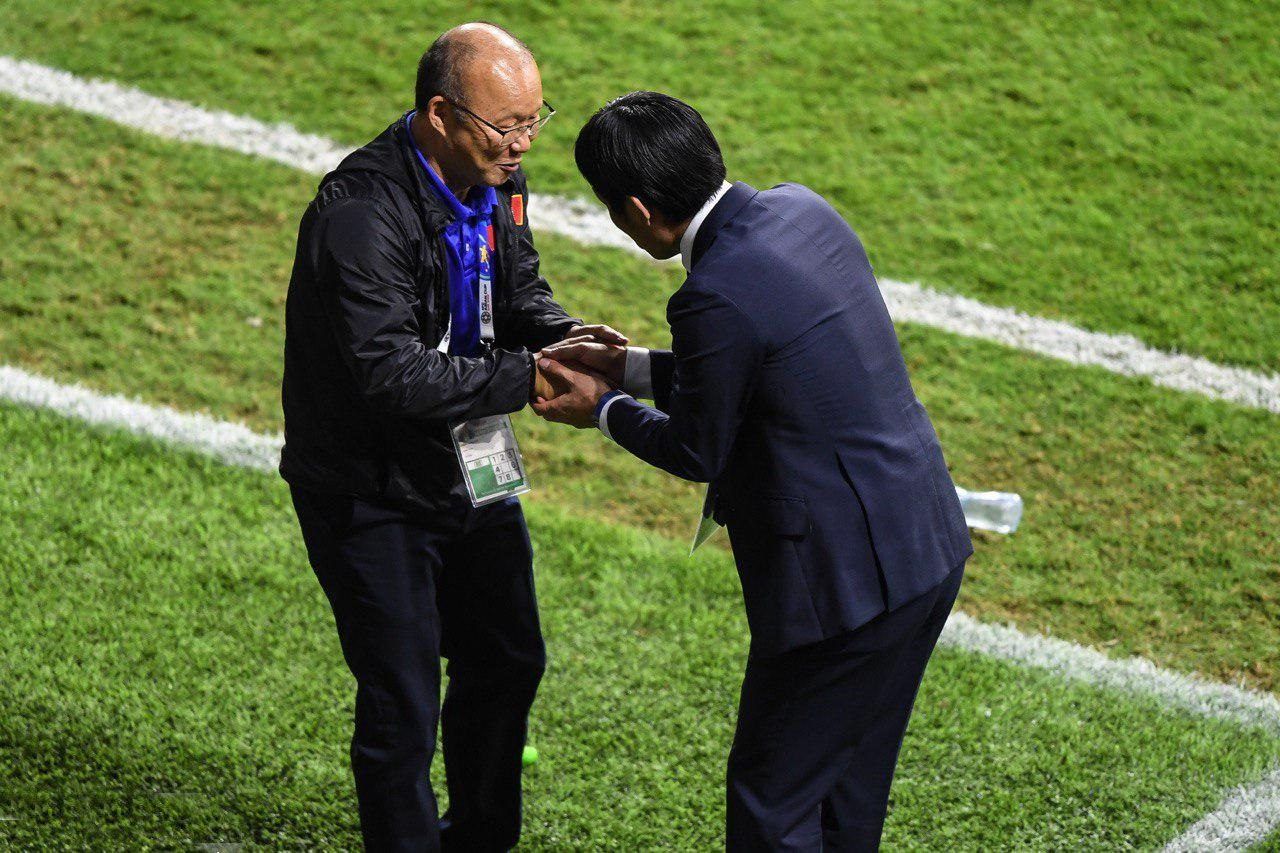
Park Hang-seo shakes hands with Japan coach, Hajime Moriyasu during the 2019 AFC Asian Cup quarter finals

On 29 September 2017, Park was appointed the manager of the Vietnam national football team. His debut match for Vietnam was a goalless draw against Afghanistan in the third round of the 2019 AFC Asian Cup qualification on 14 November 2017, which helped Vietnam qualified to the tournament since 2007. Also in charge of the under-23 side, the team reached the final of the 2018 AFC U-23 Championship, which is Vietnam's first-ever final in the official AFC competitions, but they lost 1–2 against Uzbekistan after extra time. He received Vietnam's third-class Labor Order after this achievement, although he lost the title.

At the 2018 Asian Games, his side also advanced to the semi-finals and finished fourth for the first time in 56 years, with Park earning praise for his management. On 15 December 2018, the Vietnamese team under Park won the AFF Championship after defeating Malaysia, 3–2 on aggregate, in the second leg of the finals in Mỹ Đình National Stadium of Hanoi. He received the Friendship Order from the Vietnamese government by bringing Vietnam's first regional championship in 10 years.

In the 2019 AFC Asian Cup, Vietnam reached the quarter-finals but lost to eventual runner-up Japan, 1–0. Vietnam also became the runner-up in the 2019 King's Cup as they lost 5–4 in a penalty shootout following a 1–1 draw in the final against Curaçao. Park won the gold medal at the 2019 Southeast Asian Games, thus winning the first football title for Vietnam as a united country at the games. He was awarded the second-class Labor Order by the Vietnamese government the next year. In the very next Southeast Asian games in 2022, he led Vietnam to the second straight title, before he resigned from the under-23 team.

In June 2021, for the second round of 2022 FIFA World Cup qualification, Vietnam was drawn in the same group as Thailand, Malaysia, Indonesia and the United Arab Emirates. With manager Park, the team finished as the runner-up of the group with 17 points from 8 games. Vietnam advanced to the final round of qualification for the first time ever. In the third round of the World Cup qualification, Vietnam earned 4 points by achieving a 3–1 victory to China and a 1–1 draw with Japan, although they lost eight out of ten matches. He decided to leave Vietnam after his contract expires on 31 January 2023, so the 2022 AFF Championship in December was Park's last tournament as manager of the Vietnam national football team. At this tournament, Vietnam came into the final but eventually lost to Thailand.

=== Kanchanaburi Power FC ===
In May 2026, Kanchanaburi Power FC officially appointed Park Hang-seo as head coach.

== Personal life ==
Park is a devout Methodist Protestant.

Just after the 2002 FIFA World Cup, Park received the Maengho Medal, the second-class Order of Sport Merit in South Korea, alongside other coaches and players of the national team, who reached the World Cup semi-finals. In December 2022, he also got the Heungin Medal, the second-class Order of Diplomatic Service Merit, due to his contribution to the relationship between South Korea and Vietnam.

During his tenure as Vietnam coach, he was nicknamed "Coach Terminator" by the Vietnamese media due to his supposed role in the resignation or sacking of more notable managers for losses against the lower-ranked Vietnam team. These managers include Guus Hiddink, Ján Kocian, Sven-Göran Eriksson, Antoine Hey, Simon McMenemy, Sirisak Yodyardthai, Alexandre Gama and Bert van Marwijk.

Ahead of the 2024 season, Park was appointed the sports advisor of Bắc Ninh, a Vietnamese third division team.

On 9 April 2025, Park was appointed vice-president of the Korea Football Association along with Shin Tae-yong and Kim Byung-ji by president Chung Mong-gyu.

== Managerial statistics ==
As of match played 22 November 2026

Managerial record by team and tenure
Team	From	To	Record					Ref.
Team	From	To	P	W	D	L	Win %	Ref.
Anyang LG Cheetahs (caretaker)	5 November 1996	1 December 1996	1	0	0	1	0.0	
South Korea (caretaker)	10 December 2000	20 December 2000	1	0	1	0	0.0	
South Korea U23	6 August 2002	18 October 2002	9	7	2	0	77.8	
Gyeongnam FC	22 August 2005	16 November 2007	81	31	18	32	38.3	
Jeonnam Dragons	27 December 2007	8 November 2010	110	38	28	44	34.5	
Sangju Sangmu (Note: Includes 14 matches given up in the 2012 K League.)	30 December 2011	11 December 2015	168	61	37	70	36.3	
Changwon City	11 November 2016	14 October 2017	34	8	11	15	23.5	
Vietnam	29 September 2017	31 January 2023	55	26	15	14	47.3	
Vietnam U23	11 October 2017	24 May 2022	49	32	11	6	65.3	
Kanchanaburi Power	25 May 2026	Present	13	5	6	2	38.5	
Total			521	208	129	184	39.9	

== Honours ==
=== Player ===
Hanyang University

- Korean National Championship runner-up: 1980
- Korean President's Cup: 1977

Lucky-Goldstar Hwangso

- K League 1: 1985

South Korea U20

- AFC Youth Championship: 1978

Individual

- K League 1 Best XI: 1985

=== Manager ===
Jeonnam Dragons

- Korean League Cup runner-up: 2008

Sangju Sangmu

- K League 2: 2013, 2015

Changwon City

- Korea National League Championship: 2017

South Korea U23

- Asian Games bronze medal: 2002

Vietnam U23

- AFC U-23 Championship runner-up: 2018
- SEA Games: 2019, 2021

Vietnam

- AFF Championship: 2018

Individual

- K League All-Star: 2007
- K League 2 Manager of the Year: 2013
- Korea National League Championship Best Manager: 2017
- Vietnamese Friendship Order: 2018
- AFF Coach of the Year: 2019

Sporting positions
Preceded by Kim Kwang-hoon	Lucky-Goldstar Hwangso captain 1986	Succeeded by Jung Hae-seong
