= 1984 K League Championship =

- Event: 1984 K League
| Yukong Elephants | Daewoo Royals |
| 1 | 2 |
- on aggregate

First leg
| Yukong Elephants | Daewoo Royals |
| 0 | 1 |
- Date: 10 November 1984
- Venue: Dongdaemun Stadium, Seoul

Second leg
| Daewoo Royals | Yukong Elephants |
| 1 | 1 |
- Date: 11 November 1984
- Venue: Dongdaemun Stadium, Seoul

The 1984 K League Championship was the first competition of the K League Championship, and was held to decide the second champions of the K League. It was contested between winners of two stages of the regular season, and was played over two legs.

== Qualified teams ==
| Club | Placement |
|---|---|
| Yukong Elephants | First stage winners |
| Daewoo Royals | Second stage winners |

== First leg ==
10 November 1984

| Yukong Elephants | 0–1 | Daewoo Royals |
|---|---|---|
| | | Park Chang-sun 41' |

Dongdaemun Stadium, Seoul

== Second leg ==
11 November 1984

| Daewoo Royals | 1–1 | Yukong Elephants |
|---|---|---|
| Chung Hae-won 63' | | Lee Sang-yong 87' |

Dongdaemun Stadium, Seoul

== See also ==
- 1984 K League
