= Oh Yun-kyo =

South Korean footballer

Personal information
- Full name: Oh Yun-kyo
- Date of birth: 25 May 1960
- Place of birth: Seosan, Chungnam, South Korea
- Date of death: 26 September 2000 (aged 40)
- Place of death: Seoul, South Korea
- Height: 1.85 m (6 ft 1 in)
- Position: Goalkeeper

College career
Years	Team	Apps	(Gls)
1979–1982	Hanyang University		

Senior career*
Years	Team	Apps	(Gls)
1983–1987	Yukong Elephants	45	(0)
1988–1990	Hyundai Horang-i	49	(0)
Total		94	(0)

International career
1979	South Korea U20	3	(0)
1982	South Korea B		
1984–1986	South Korea	10	(0)
- * Club domestic league appearances and goals

- Oh Yun-kyo
- Hangul: 오연교
- Hanja: 吳連敎
- RR: O Yeongyo
- MR: O Yŏn'gyo

Oh Yun-kyo (May 25, 1960 – September 26, 2000) was a South Korean football player and coach. He played as a goalkeeper for the South Korea national team at the 1986 FIFA World Cup. After retiring as a player, he worked as South Korea's goalkeeper coach at the 1994 FIFA World Cup. On 26 September 2000, Oh died from a chronic liver disease when serving as a goalkeeper coach of K League club Jeonnam Dragons.

== Honours ==
Hanyang University

- Korean National Championship runner-up: 1980

Hyundai Horang-i

- Korean National Championship runner-up: 1989

Individual

- K League 1 Best Goalkeeper: 1984, 1988
- K League 1 Best XI: 1984, 1988
