= Kwang-hoon =

- Hangul: 광훈
- RR: Gwanghun
- MR: Kwanghun

Kwang-hoon is a Korean given name.

People with this name include:

- Jeon Kwang-hoon (born 1956), South Korean pastor and politician
- Kim Kwang-hoon (weightlifter) (born 1982), South Korean weightlifter
- Kim Kwang-Hoon (footballer) (born 1961), South Korean footballer
- Lee Gwang-Hoon (born 1993), South Korean footballer
- Lee Kwang-hoon (born 1959), South Korean film director
- Shin Kwang-Hoon (born 1987), South Korean footballer

== See also ==
- List of Korean given names
