= Kim Kwang-hoon =

Kim Kwang-hoon may refer to:

- Kim Kwang-hoon (weightlifter)
- Kim Kwang-hoon (footballer)
