= 1984 K League =

Korean Super League
- Season: 1984
- Dates: Regular season: 31 March – 4 November 1984; Championship: 10–11 November 1984
- Champions: Daewoo Royals (1st title)
- Asian Club Championship: Daewoo Royals
- Matches: 112
- Goals: 301 (2.69 per match)
- Best Player: Park Chang-sun
- Top goalscorer: Baek Jong-chul (16 goals)
- Best goalkeeper: Oh Yun-kyo
- Highest scoring: Daewoo 4–5 Lucky-Goldstar (12 May 1984)

The 1984 Korean Super League was the second season of top football league in South Korea. A total of eight teams participated in the league. Six of them were professional teams (Hallelujah FC, Yukong Elephants, Daewoo Royals, POSCO Dolphins, Lucky-Goldstar Hwangso, Hyundai Horang-i), and the other teams were semi-professional teams (Hanil Bank and Kookmin Bank). It began on 31 March and ended on 11 November. It divided into two stages, and winners of each stage qualified for the championship playoffs. It gave 3 points for a win, 2 points for a draw, and 1 point for a draw without a goal.

== Schedule ==
| First stage | | | Second stage | | |
| Date | Place | Stadium | Date | Place | Stadium |
|---|---|---|---|---|---|
| 31 March – 1 April | Seoul | Dongdaemun Stadium | 28 July – 29 July | Seoul | Dongdaemun Stadium |
| 7 April – 8 April | Busan | Busan Gudeok Stadium | 1 August – 2 August | Seoul | Hyochang Stadium |
| 21 April – 22 April | Seoul | Dongdaemun Stadium | 4 August – 5 August | Seoul | Dongdaemun Stadium |
| 28 April – 29 April | Daejeon | Daejeon Hanbat Stadium | 7 August – 8 August | Seoul | Hyochang Stadium |
| 5 May – 6 May | Cheongju | Cheongju Stadium | 11 August – 12 August | Gangneung | Gangneung Stadium |
| 12 May – 13 May | Wonju | Wonju Stadium | 17 August – 18 August | Busan | Busan Gudeok Stadium |
| 19 May – 20 May | Ulsan | Ulsan Complex Stadium | 25 August – 26 August | Ulsan | Ulsan Complex Stadium |
| 16 June – 17 June | Jeonju | Jeonju Stadium | 29 August – 30 August | Daegu | Daegu Civic Stadium |
| 23 June – 24 June | Gwangju | Gwangju Mudeung Stadium | 1 September – 2 September | Andong | Andong Stadium |
| 27 June – 28 June | Busan | Busan Gudeok Stadium | 8 September – 9 September | Masan | Masan Stadium |
| 30 June – 1 July | Busan | Busan Gudeok Stadium | 15 September – 16 September | Gwangju | Gwangju Stadium |
| 7 July – 8 July | Seoul | Hyochang Stadium | 22 September – 23 September | Incheon | Incheon Sungui Stadium |
| 14 July – 15 July | Gangneung | Gangneung Stadium | 27 October – 28 October | Cheongju | Cheongju Stadium |
| 21 July – 22 July | Busan | Busan Gudeok Stadium | 3 November – 4 November | Seoul | Dongdaemun Stadium |

== Foreign players ==
| Team | Player 1 | Player 2 | Player 3 | Player 4 |
|---|---|---|---|---|
| Daewoo Royals | | | | |
| Hallelujah FC | | | | |
| Hanil Bank | | | | |
| Hyundai Horang-i | (Ghana) George Alhassan | (Netherlands) Rob Landsbergen | | |
| Kookmin Bank | | | | |
| Lucky-Goldstar Hwangso | (Thailand) Piyapong Pue-on | | | |
| POSCO Dolphins | (Brazil) Julio César | (Brazil) Luis | (Brazil) Wilsinho | (Brazil) Zézé Gomes |
| Yukong Elephants | | | | |

== Regular season ==
=== First stage ===
| Pos | Team | Pld | W | D | 0D | L | GF | GA | GD | Pts | Qualification |
|---|---|---|---|---|---|---|---|---|---|---|---|
| 1 | Yukong Elephants | 14 | 9 | 2 | 0 | 3 | 21 | 9 | +12 | 31 | Qualification for the playoffs |
| 2 | Daewoo Royals | 14 | 9 | 1 | 1 | 3 | 24 | 15 | +9 | 30 | |
| 3 | Hyundai Horang-i | 14 | 6 | 4 | 2 | 2 | 21 | 9 | +12 | 28 | |
| 4 | Hallelujah FC | 14 | 5 | 3 | 1 | 5 | 16 | 18 | −2 | 22 | |
| 5 | Lucky-Goldstar Hwangso | 14 | 5 | 1 | 2 | 6 | 20 | 22 | −2 | 19 | |
| 6 | POSCO Dolphins | 14 | 3 | 5 | 0 | 6 | 13 | 17 | −4 | 19 | |
| 7 | Hanil Bank | 14 | 3 | 4 | 0 | 7 | 14 | 26 | −12 | 17 | |
| 8 | Kookmin Bank | 14 | 1 | 2 | 2 | 9 | 12 | 25 | −13 | 9 | |

Source: RSSSF

=== Second stage ===
| Pos | Team | Pld | W | D | 0D | L | GF | GA | GD | Pts | Qualification |
|---|---|---|---|---|---|---|---|---|---|---|---|
| 1 | Daewoo Royals | 14 | 8 | 1 | 3 | 2 | 23 | 8 | +15 | 29 | Qualification for the playoffs |
| 2 | Hyundai Horang-i | 14 | 7 | 3 | 1 | 3 | 29 | 20 | +9 | 28 | |
| 3 | POSCO Dolphins | 14 | 7 | 2 | 0 | 5 | 28 | 27 | +1 | 25 | |
| 4 | Hallelujah FC | 14 | 5 | 3 | 2 | 4 | 18 | 17 | +1 | 23 | |
| 5 | Yukong Elephants | 14 | 4 | 3 | 4 | 3 | 17 | 13 | +4 | 22 | |
| 6 | Hanil Bank | 14 | 2 | 4 | 3 | 5 | 12 | 19 | −7 | 17 | |
| 7 | Lucky-Goldstar Hwangso | 14 | 3 | 2 | 1 | 8 | 18 | 23 | −5 | 14 | |
| 8 | Kookmin Bank | 14 | 2 | 4 | 0 | 8 | 15 | 33 | −18 | 14 | |

Source: RSSSF

=== Overall table ===
| Pos | Team | Pld | W | D | 0D | L | GF | GA | GD | Pts | Qualification |
|---|---|---|---|---|---|---|---|---|---|---|---|
| 1 | Daewoo Royals | 28 | 17 | 2 | 4 | 5 | 47 | 23 | +24 | 59 | Qualification for the Asian Club Championship |
| 2 | Hyundai Horang-i | 28 | 13 | 7 | 3 | 5 | 50 | 29 | +21 | 56 | |
| 3 | Yukong Elephants | 28 | 13 | 5 | 4 | 6 | 38 | 22 | +16 | 53 | |
| 4 | Hallelujah FC | 28 | 10 | 6 | 3 | 9 | 34 | 35 | −1 | 45 | |
| 5 | POSCO Dolphins | 28 | 10 | 7 | 0 | 11 | 41 | 44 | −3 | 44 | |
| 6 | Hanil Bank | 28 | 5 | 9 | 2 | 12 | 26 | 45 | −19 | 35 | |
| 7 | Lucky-Goldstar Hwangso | 28 | 8 | 3 | 3 | 14 | 38 | 45 | −7 | 33 | |
| 8 | Kookmin Bank | 28 | 3 | 6 | 2 | 17 | 27 | 58 | −31 | 23 | |

Source: RSSSF

== Championship playoffs ==
| Team 1 | Agg. | Team 2 | 1st leg | 2nd leg |
|---|---|---|---|---|
| Yukong Elephants | 1–2 | Daewoo Royals (C) | 0–1 | 1–1 |

== Top scorers ==
| Rank | Scorer | Club | Goals | Apps |
|---|---|---|---|---|
| 1 | (South Korea) Baek Jong-chul | Hyundai Horang-i | 16 | 28 |
| 2 | (South Korea) Choi Soon-ho | POSCO Dolphins | 14 | 24 |
| 2 | (South Korea) Kim Yong-se | Yukong Elephants | 14 | 28 |
| 4 | (South Korea) Lee Tae-ho | Daewoo Royals | 11 | 20 |
| 5 | (South Korea) Oh Seok-jae | Hallelujah FC | 9 | 22 |
| 5 | (Netherlands) Rob Landsbergen | Hyundai Horang-i | 9 | 27 |
| 5 | (South Korea) Cho Young-jeung | Lucky-Goldstar Hwangso | 9 | 28 |
| 8 | (South Korea) Lee Yong-soo | Lucky-Goldstar Hwangso | 8 | 25 |

== Awards ==
=== Main awards ===
| Award | Winner | Club |
|---|---|---|
| Most Valuable Player | (South Korea) Park Chang-sun | Daewoo Royals |
| Top goalscorer | (South Korea) Baek Jong-chul | Hyundai Horang-i |
| Top assist provider | (Netherlands) Rob Landsbergen | Hyundai Horang-i |
| Manager of the Year | (South Korea) Chang Woon-soo | Daewoo Royals |
| Best Goalkeeper | (South Korea) Oh Yun-kyo | Yukong Elephants |
| Exemplary Award | (South Korea) Cho Young-jeung | Lucky-Goldstar Hwangso |
| Fighting Spirit Award | (South Korea) Chung Yong-hwan | Daewoo Royals |
| Popularity Award | (South Korea) Huh Jung-moo | Hyundai Horang-i |
| Best Referee | (South Korea) Na Yoon-sik | — |

=== Best XI ===
| Position | Winner | Club |
|---|---|---|
| Goalkeeper | (South Korea) Oh Yun-kyo | Yukong Elephants |
| Defenders | (South Korea) Chung Yong-hwan | Daewoo Royals |
| Defenders | (South Korea) Park Kyung-hoon | POSCO Dolphins |
| Defenders | (South Korea) Park Sung-hwa | Hallelujah FC |
| Defenders | (South Korea) Chung Jong-soo | Yukong Elephants |
| Midfielders | (South Korea) Park Chang-sun | Daewoo Royals |
| Midfielders | (South Korea) Huh Jung-moo | Hyundai Horang-i |
| Midfielders | (South Korea) Cho Young-jeung | Lucky-Goldstar Hwangso |
| Forwards | (South Korea) Choi Soon-ho | POSCO Dolphins |
| Forwards | (South Korea) Lee Tae-ho | Daewoo Royals |
| Forwards | (South Korea) Baek Jong-chul | Hyundai Horang-i |

=== Monthly Golden Ball ===
| Month | Winner | Club |
|---|---|---|
| April | (South Korea) Yoo Tae-mok | Daewoo Royals |
| May | (South Korea) Lee Yong-soo | Lucky-Goldstar Hwangso |
| June | (South Korea) Hwang Seok-keun | Hanil Bank |
| July | (South Korea) Hong Seok-min | POSCO Dolphins |
| August | (South Korea) Choi Soon-ho | POSCO Dolphins |
| September | (Thailand) Piyapong Pue-on | Lucky-Goldstar Hwangso |
| October | (South Korea) Lee Tae-ho | Daewoo Royals |

== See also ==
- 1984 K League Championship
