= Park Chang-sun =

South Korean footballer (born 1954)

Personal information
- Full name: Park Chang-sun
- Date of birth: 2 February 1954 (age 72)
- Place of birth: Gimhae, Gyeongnam, South Korea
- Height: 1.70 m (5 ft 7 in)
- Position: Attacking midfielder

Youth career
- Donga High School

College career
Years	Team	Apps	(Gls)
1973–1976	Kyung Hee University		

Senior career*
Years	Team	Apps	(Gls)
1977–1982	POSCO FC		
1978–1980	→ ROK Army (draft)		
1983	Hallelujah FC	15	(3)
1984–1986	Daewoo Royals	43	(6)
1987	Yukong Elephants	13	(2)
Total		71	(11)

International career
1973–1974	South Korea U20		
1976	South Korea B		
1979–1986	South Korea	34	(9)

Managerial career
- 1993–2003: Kyung Hee University
- 1998: South Korea U20
Medal record
Men's football
Representing South Korea (as player)
FISU World University Championships
Gold medal – first place	1976 Uruguay	Team
Asian Games
Gold medal – first place	1986 Seoul	Team
AFC Youth Championship
Bronze medal – third place	1973 Iran	Team
Bronze medal – third place	1974 Thailand	Team
Representing South Korea (as manager)
AFC Youth Championship
Gold medal – first place	1998 Thailand	Team
- * Club domestic league appearances and goals

- Park Chang-sun
- Hangul: 박창선
- Hanja: 朴昌善
- RR: Bak Changseon
- MR: Pak Ch'angsŏn

Park Chang-sun (born 2 February 1954) is a South Korean former international footballer.

== Playing career ==
Park played for six clubs in South Korea and won domestic leagues with five teams. He played roles as the captain and the playmaker for South Korea at the 1986 FIFA World Cup, and scored the first South Korean goal of the FIFA World Cup against Argentina. He was selected as one of the FIFA World Stars after the World Cup, and played in the charity match. Lastly, he participated in the 1986 Asian Games and contributed to South Korea's gold medal.

== Style of play ==
Park is regarded as one of the greatest South Korean attacking midfielders of all time. He was originally noted for his powerful long-range shots, but he was also skilled in creating chances during his prime.

== Career statistics ==
=== International ===
Appearances and goals by national team and year
National team	Year	Apps	Goals
South Korea	1979	3	1
South Korea	1984	8	2
South Korea	1985	13	2
South Korea	1986	10	4
Career total		34	9

Results list South Korea's goal tally first.

List of international goals scored by Park Chang-sun
No.	Date	Venue	Cap	Opponent	Score	Result	Competition
1	16 September 1979	Incheon, South Korea	3	Bangladesh	8–0	9–0	1979 Korea Cup
2	4 October 1984	Seoul, South Korea	4	Cameroon	1–0	5–0	Friendly
3	19 October 1984	Kolkata, India	7	India	1–0	1–0	1984 AFC Asian Cup qualification
4	19 May 1985	Seoul, South Korea	13	Malaysia	1–0	2–0	1986 FIFA World Cup qualification
5	6 June 1985	Daejeon, South Korea	14	Thailand	2–1	3–2	1985 Korea Cup
6	2 June 1986	Mexico City, Mexico	26	Argentina	1–3	1–3	1986 FIFA World Cup
7	20 September 1986	Busan, South Korea	29	India	3–0	3–0	1986 Asian Games
8	28 September 1986	Busan, South Korea	31	China	1–0	4–2	1986 Asian Games
9	1 October 1986	Busan, South Korea	32	Iran	1–0	1–1 (a.e.t.) (5–4 p)	1986 Asian Games

== Honours ==
=== Player ===
POSCO FC

- Korean National Semipro League: 1982
- Korean National Semipro League (Autumn): 1981
- Korean National Championship runner-up: 1977

ROK Army

- Korean National Semipro League (Spring): 1980
- Korean National Championship: 1979
- Korean President's Cup runner-up: 1980

Hallelujah FC

- K League 1: 1983

Daewoo Royals

- K League 1: 1984
- Korean League Cup runner-up: 1986
- Asian Club Championship: 1985–86

South Korea U20

- AFC Youth Championship third place: 1973, 1974

South Korea B

- FISU World University Championships: 1976

South Korea

- Asian Games: 1986

Individual

- Korean National Semipro League (Spring) Best Player: 1980
- Korean National Semipro League (Autumn) top goalscorer: 1981
- Korean National Semipro League Best Player: 1982
- K League 1 top assist provider: 1983
- K League 1 Best XI: 1983, 1984
- K League 1 Most Valuable Player: 1984
- Korean FA Best XI: 1984, 1985, 1986
- FIFA World XI: 1986
- K League '80s All-Star Team: 2003

=== Manager ===
Kyung Hee University

- Korean President's Cup: 2001

South Korea U20

- AFC Youth Championship: 1998
