= Kim Min-hai =

South Korean footballer (born 1954)

Personal information
- Date of birth: April 12, 1954 (age 72)
- Place of birth: South Korea
- Height: 1.79 m (5 ft 10 1/2 in)
- Position: Midfielder

Youth career
- 1973–1975: Youngdong High School

Senior career*
Years	Team	Apps	(Gls)
1976–1979	Korea Electricity	?	(?)
1979–1981	SV Darmstadt 98	4	(0)
1981–1982	SV Waldhof Mannheim	1	(0)
1983	Daewoo Royals	9	(0)
1984–1985	Hallelujah FC	17	(0)
- * Club domestic league appearances and goals as of 11 August 2015 ‡ National team caps and goals as of 1 February 2012

- Kim Min-hai
- Hangul: 김민혜
- Hanja: 金敏慧
- RR: Gim Minhye
- MR: Kim Minhye

Kim Min-hai (Korean: 김민혜; born on 4 December 1954) is a South Korean footballer who played for SV Darmstadt 98, SV Waldhof Mannheim, and Daewoo Royals as a midfielder.

== Career ==
Kim Min-hai joined SV Darmstadt 98 in 1979 and transferred to SV Waldhof Mannheim in June 1981.

In May 1983, he returned to Korea and joined Daewoo Royals with Park Jong-won.
