= Rob Landsbergen =

Dutch footballer (1960–2022)

Personal information
- Date of birth: 25 February 1960
- Place of birth: Southern Rhodesia
- Date of death: 29 September 2022 (aged 62)
- Height: 1.97 m (6 ft 6 in)
- Position: Forward

Senior career*
Years	Team	Apps	(Gls)
1978–1984	PSV	68	(10)
1980–1981	→ Willem II (loan)	5	(0)
1984–1985	Hyundai Horangi	38	(11)
1986–1988	NAC Breda	13	(3)
1988–1990	Helmond Sport	32	(7)
Total		156	(31)
- * Club domestic league appearances and goals

Rob Landsbergen (25 February 1960 – 29 September 2022) was a Dutch footballer who played as a forward for PSV Eindhoven and South Korean Hyundai Horangi. He was the first Dutch football player to play for a Korean club.

Landsbergen died from complications of Alzheimer's disease on 29 September 2022, at the age of 62.

== Career statistics ==
Appearances and goals by club, season and competition
Club	Season	League			Cup (Note: Includes KNVB Cup, KFA Cup)		Continental		Total	
Club	Season	Division	Apps	Goals	Apps	Goals	Apps	Goals	Apps	Goals
PSV	1978–79	Eredivisie	3	0			0	0		
PSV	1979–80	Eredivisie	5	1			0	0		
PSV	1980–81	Eredivisie	9	2			0	0		
PSV	1981–82	Eredivisie	22	5			2	0		
PSV	1982–83	Eredivisie	21	1			2	0		
PSV	1983–84	Eredivisie	8	1			1	0		
PSV	Total		68	10			5	0		
Willem II (loan)	1980–81	Eredivisie	5	0			–			
Hyundai Horangi	1984	K-League	27	9	–		–		27	9
Hyundai Horangi	1985	K-League	11	2	–		–		11	2
Hyundai Horangi	Total		38	11	–		–		38	11
NAC Breda	1986–87	Eerste Divisie	13	3			–			
NAC Breda	1987–88	Eerste Divisie					–			
NAC Breda	Total									
Helmond Sport	1988–89	Eerste Divisie					–			
Helmond Sport	1989–90	Eerste Divisie	32	7			–			
Helmond Sport	Total									
Career total			156	28			5	0		

== Honors ==
PSV

- President's Cup: 1983

Individual

- K League Top Assists Award: 1984
