= Baek Jong-chul =

South Korean footballer

Baek Jong-Chul 백종철
Personal information
- Full name: Baek Jong-Chul
- Date of birth: March 9, 1961 (age 65)
- Place of birth: South Korea
- Position: Forward

Team information
- Current team: Daegu FC

Youth career
- 1980–1984: Kyung Hee University

Senior career*
Years	Team	Apps	(Gls)
1984–1988	Hyundai Horangi	83	(22)
1989–1991	Ilhwa Chunma	52	(12)

International career^{‡}
1985–1990	South Korea	?	(?)

Managerial career
- 1992: Honam University (assistant)
- 1993–1998: Ilhwa Chunma (assistant)
- 1999–2010: Yeungjin College
- 2004–2006: South Korea women's U-20
- 2011: Busan I'Park (assistant)
- 2013–: Daegu FC
- * Club domestic league appearances and goals as of December 2, 2011 ‡ National team caps and goals as of December 2, 2008

Baek Jong-Chul (Korean: 백종철, Korean pronunciation: [pɛ̝k̚.t͈ɕoŋ.tɕʰʌl] or [pɛ̝k̚] [tɕoŋ.tɕʰʌl]; born on March 9, 1961) is a former South Korea football player. He was top scorer of 1984 K-League campaign. He is currently manager of Daegu FC.

== Honors and awards ==
=== Player ===
Hyundai Horangi

- League Cup Winners (2) : 1986

=== Individual ===
- K League Regular Season Top Scorer Award (1): 1984
- K League Best XI (1) : 1984
