= Cho Yoon-hwan =

South Korean footballer (born 1961)

Cho Yoon-Hwan 조윤환
Personal information
- Full name: Cho Yoon-Hwan
- Date of birth: May 24, 1961 (age 65)
- Place of birth: Incheon, South Korea
- Height: 1.82 m (5 ft 11 1/2 in)
- Position: Defender

Youth career
- 1981–1985: Myongji University

Senior career*
Years	Team	Apps	(Gls)
1985	Hallelujah FC	14	(0)
1987–1990	Yukong Elephants	88	(9)

International career^{‡}
1983–1989	South Korea	11	(0)

Managerial career
- 1991–1998: Yukong Elephants / Bucheon SK (Coach)
- 1994: Yukong Elephants (caretaker manager)
- 1998: Bucheon SK (caretaker manager)
- 1999–2001: Bucheon SK
- 2001–2005: Jeonbuk Hyundai Motors
- 2007: Harbin Yiteng
- 2012–2013: Becamex Binh Duong F.C.
- * Club domestic league appearances and goals as of 18 June 2009 ‡ National team caps and goals as of 18 June 2009

- Cho Yoon-hwan
- Hangul: 조윤환
- Hanja: 趙允煥
- RR: Jo Yunhwan
- MR: Cho Yunhwan

Cho Yoon-Hwan (born May 24, 1961) is a South Korean football manager and former football defender.

He played in K-League side Hallelujah FC and Yukong Elephants in South Korea.

He was a member of the South Korea national football team. He played his first senior match against Thailand as a substitute in President's Cup on June 6, 1983. Cho also participated in the 1988 AFC Asian Cup and the 1990 FIFA World Cup qualification.

== Club career statistics ==
All-Time Club Performance
Club	Season	League			League Cup			AFC Champions League			Total
Club	Season	Apps	Goals	Assts	Apps	Goals	Assts	Apps	Goals	Assts	Apps	Goals	Assts
Hallelujah FC	1985	14	0	0	-	-	-	-	-	-	14	0	0
Hallelujah FC	Total	14	0	0	-	-	-	-	-	-	14	0	0
Yukong Elephants	1986	0	0	0	0	0	0	-	-	-	31	0	3
Yukong Elephants	1987	20	3	1	-	-	-	-	-	-	25	3	6
Yukong Elephants	1988	21	0	0	-	-	-	-	-	-	20	0	2
Yukong Elephants	1989	30	5	6	-	-	-	-	-	-	9	0	0
Yukong Elephants	1990	17	1	2	-	-	-	-	-	-	13	2	3
Yukong Elephants	Total	88	9	9	0	0	0	-	-	-	88	9	9
Career totals		102	9	9	0	0	0	-	-	-	102	9	9

== Honours ==
=== Club ===
==== Player ====
Yukong Elephants

- K-League (1): 1989

==== Manager ====
Jeonbuk Hyundai Motors

- Korean FA Cup (1): 2003

=== Country ===
South Korea

- AFC Asian Cup Runner-up (1): 1988

=== Individual ===
- K-League Best XI (1): 1989
