= Jung Hae-seong =

South Korean football manager and former player

Chung Hae-soung 정해성
Personal information
- Full name: Chung Hae-soung
- Date of birth: 4 March 1958 (age 68)
- Place of birth: Busan, South Korea
- Position: Defender

Youth career
- 1975–1977: Chung-Ang High School
- 1978–1981: Korea University

Senior career*
Years	Team	Apps	(Gls)
1982–1983	Korea First Bank FC		
1984–1989	Lucky-Goldstar FC	106	(2)

Managerial career
- 1990–1994: LG Cheetahs (assistant coach)
- 1995: Pohang Atoms (assistant coach)
- 1996: South Korea (assistant coach)
- 1996–1998: Jeonnam Dragons (assistant coach)
- 1999–2000: South Korea U-23 (Chief Assistant Coach)
- 2000–2002: South Korea (assistant coach)
- 2003–2007: Bucheon SK / Jeju United
- 2008–2010: South Korea (Chief Assistant Coach)
- 2010–2012: Jeonnam Dragons
- 2017: Chung-Ang High School (Technical Director)
- 2017: South Korea (Chief Assistant Coach)
- 2017–2018: Hoàng Anh Gia Lai (Technical Director)
- 2018–2020: Hồ Chí Minh City
- * Club domestic league appearances and goals as of 26 December 2018

- Jung Hae-seong
- Hangul: 정해성
- Hanja: 鄭海成
- RR: Jeong Haeseong
- MR: Chŏng Haesŏng

Chung Hae-soung (Korean: 정해성; Hanja: 鄭海成, born March 4, 1958, in Busan) is a South Korean football manager and former player.

== Club career ==
- 1984-1989 Lucky-Goldstar (currently FC Seoul)

== Managerial career ==
In 1989, Chung retired as a player and started his managerial career.

From 1990 to 1998, he was an assistant coach for teams such as LG Cheetahs, Pohang Atoms and Jeonnam Dragons.

In 2000, he was the chief assistant coach of Korea's national team for the Sydney Olympics. He was an assistant coach for Guus Hiddink's Korea national team with Park Hang-seo in 2002 Korea-Japan World Cup. Park and Chung are the same age and together support Hiddink.

In 2003, he debuted as the manager of Bucheon SK (currently Jeju United FC). His team finished in second place in the 2004 FA Cup, 4th place in the 2005 K League and were the semi-finalists in the 2007 FA Cup.

In 2008, he joined the Korea national team as a chief assistant coach. With Huh Jung-moo, he led the team to the round of 16 in 2010 South Africa World Cup.

After that, he was appointed as the Jeonnam Dragons FC manager to replace Park Hang-seo. The team conceded the fewest goals in the 2011 season.

Since 2014, he has taken charge of outside director of Korea Football Association. When Korea national team faced big problem their situation in 2017, he was picked as a fire fighter (chief assistant coach).

But, he resigned by himself for next coaching generation (current Shin tae Yong).

When Korea national team faced big problem their situation in 2017, he was mentioned for the manager of Korea national team with Huh jung moo, Shin tae yong.(Who could be the next manager of KNT?)

His philosophy is "There is no player above the team". He is known for his research and team building approach. He also managed his interaction with the media and public.

=== Coach & manager career list ===
- 1990-1994 LG Cheetahs (assistant coach)
- 1995 Pohang Atoms (assistant coach)
- 1996-1998 Jeonnam Dragons (assistant coach)
- 1999-2000 South Korea U-23 (chief assistant coach)
- 2000-2002 South Korea (assistant coach with Hiddink with Park Hang-seo)
- 2003-2007 Bucheon SK / Jeju United FC (manager)
- 2008-2010 South Korea (chief assistant coach)
- 2010-2012 Jeonnam Dragons (manager)
- 2017 Chung-Ang High School (technical director)
- 2017 South Korea (chief assistant coach)
- 2017-2018 Hoang Anh Gia Lai (technical director)
- 2019–2020 Hồ Chí Minh City (manager)

== Licenses ==
- P License by Asian Football confederation
- A License by Korean Football Association
- B License by Korean Football confederation
- Germany FC Schalke 04 & F.C. Hansa Rostock Coaching School

== Club career statistics ==
All-Time Club Performance
Club	Season	League		League Cup		AFC Champions League		Total
Club	Season	Apps	Goals	Apps	Goals	Apps	Goals	Apps	Goals
Lucky-Goldstar FC	1984	10	0	–	–	–	–	10	0
Lucky-Goldstar FC	1985	16	0	–	–	–	–	16	0
Lucky-Goldstar FC	1986	18	0	12	0			30	0
Lucky-Goldstar FC	1987	13	0	–	–			13	0
Lucky-Goldstar FC	1988	21	1	–	–	–	–	21	1
Lucky-Goldstar FC	1989	28	1	–	–	–	–	28	1
Lucky-Goldstar FC	Total	106	2	12	0	–	–	118	2
Career Totals		106	2	12	0	–	–	118	2

Sporting positions
Preceded by Park Hang-Seo	Lucky-Goldstar Hwangso captain 1986–1988	Succeeded by Choi Jin-Han
