= Kim Kwang-hoon (footballer) =

South Korean footballer (born 1961)

Personal information
- Full name: Kim Kwang-hoon
- Date of birth: February 20, 1961 (age 65)
- Place of birth: South Korea

Youth career
- 1975–1979: Hanyang University

Senior career*
Years	Team	Apps	(Gls)
1979–1982	Seoul Trust Bank FC		
1983	Yukong Elephants	2	(0)
1984–1985	Lucky-Goldstar Hwangso	36	(0)
- * Club domestic league appearances and goals

Kim Kwang-hoon (born February 20, 1961) is a former South Korean footballer.

He graduated at Hanyang University, and played for Lucky-Goldstar Hwangso, where he was the first club's captain.

== Club career ==
- 1983 Yukong Elephants
- 1984–1985 Lucky-Goldstar Hwangso

== Honours ==
=== Player ===
- Lucky-Goldstar Hwangso
- K-League Winner (1): 1985

=== Individual ===
Sporting positions
Preceded by Han Moon-bae	Lucky-Goldstar Hwangso captain 1985	Succeeded by Park Hang-seo
