= Tınaz Tırpan =

Turkish football manager

Personal information
- Date of birth: 28 April 1939 (age 87)
- Place of birth: Turkey

Managerial career
- Years: Team
- 1983–1985: Gençlerbirliği S.K.
- 1985–1987: Kayserispor
- 1987–1988: Gençlerbirliği S.K.
- 1988–1989: Turkey
- 1990: Fenerbahçe SK
- 1999: Ankaragücü
- 2002–2003: Bucheon SK

Tınaz Tırpan (born 28 April 1939 in Turkey) is a former coach of the Turkey national football team, Kayserispor and Fenerbahçe SK.

Tırpan was appointed as Turkey coach in 1988, succeeding Mustafa Denizli. Under him, the Turks came very close to qualifying for the 1990 World Cup, but missed out qualification when they lost their final game 2–0 to the USSR.

After his spell in charge of Turkey, Tırpan was appointed Fenerbahçe SK coach, but lasted only five weeks in the job.

He then coached Ankaragücü in the 1999–2000 season, and steered them to UEFA Cup qualification.

Tırpan then took a break from football for two years. In 2002, he was appointed coach of Bucheon SK in South-Korea. His stay lasted only for one season because of poor results.

== Managing career ==
- Turkish national football team 1988-1989
- Fenerbahçe SK 1990
- Ankaragücü 1999
- Bucheon SK 2002-2003
