= Kang Shin-woo =

South Korean footballer (born 1959)

Personal information
- Full name: Kang Shin-woo
- Date of birth: March 18, 1959 (age 67)

Youth career
- 1980–1983: Seoul National University

Senior career*
Years	Team	Apps	(Gls)
1982–1986	Daewoo Royals	84	(7)
1987	Lucky-Goldstar Hwangso	18	(0)

International career
1979–1985	South Korea	8	(2)
- * Club domestic league appearances and goals as of 30 June 2017

Kang Shin-woo (Korean: 강신우; born March 18, 1959) is a former South Korean football player. He joined Daewoo Royals in 1982. After retirement he became a football commentator.

== Club career ==
He was a founding member of the Daewoo Royals and transferred to Luckey-Goldstar Hwangso.
