= Park Jong-won (footballer) =

South Korean footballer (born 1955)

Personal information
- Date of birth: April 12, 1955 (age 71)
- Place of birth: South Korea
- Height: 1.79 m (5 ft 10 1/2 in)
- Position: Forward

Youth career
- 1975–1977: Yonsei University

Senior career*
Years	Team	Apps	(Gls)
1978	Hanil Bank	?	(?)
1979–1980	ROK Army FC (military service)	?	(?)
1981–1982	1. FC Kaiserslautern	0	(0)
1982–1983	Sint-Truidense V.V.		
1983–1985	Daewoo Royals	22	(1)

International career^{‡}
1972–1974	South Korea U-20		
1975–1980	South Korea B		
1976–1977	South Korea	7	(0)
- * Club domestic league appearances and goals as of 11 August 2015 ‡ National team caps and goals as of 1 February 2012

Park Jong-won (Korean: 박종원; born on April 12, 1955) is a South Korean footballer who played for 1. FC Kaiserslautern, K. Sint-Truidense V.V., and Daewoo Royals as a forward.

== Career ==
=== Early career ===
He joined Bundesliga side 1. FC Kaiserslautern in 1981.

In May 1983, he returned to Korea and joined Daewoo Royals with Kim Min-hai.

== Honours ==
- Daewoo Royals
  - K League 1: 1984
- Individual
  - 1980 King's Cup: Top goalscorer
