= Lee Yong-soo =

South Korean footballer and commentator

Lee Yong-Soo
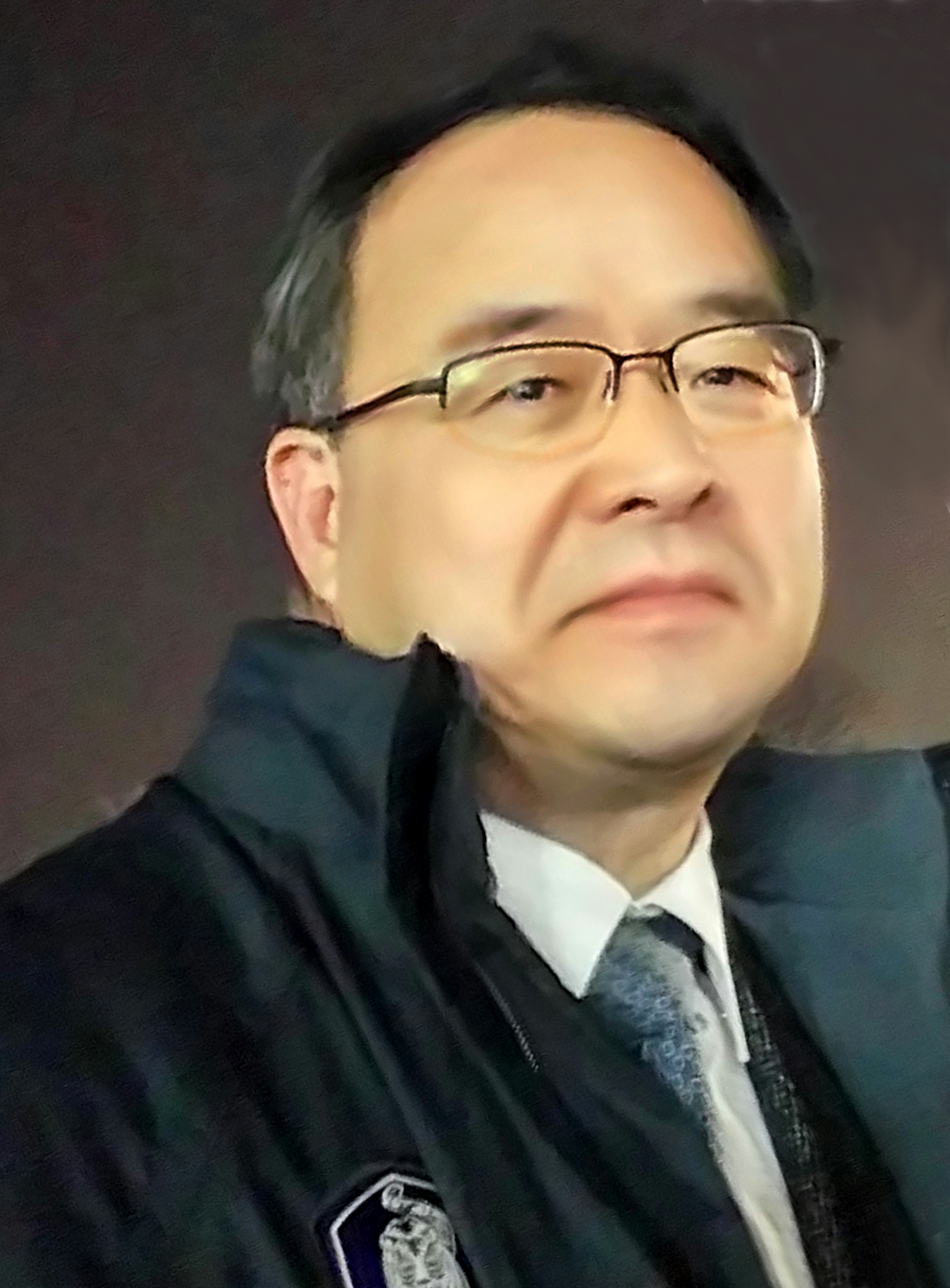

Personal information
- Full name: Lee Yong-Soo
- Date of birth: December 27, 1959 (age 66)

Youth career
- 1980–1983: Seoul University

Senior career*
Years	Team	Apps	(Gls)
1981–1982	Navy FC	?	(?)
1983	Commercial Bank of Korea FC	?	(?)
1984	Lucky-Goldstar Hwangso	25	(8)
1985	Hallelujah FC	10	(0)
- * Club domestic league appearances and goals as of 30 June 2017

Lee Yong-Soo is a South Korean football former player. After retirement, he became a famous football commentator.

== Club career ==
He was founding member of FC Seoul, then known as Lucky-Goldstar Hwangso
