= Andong Civic Stadium =

Sporting stadium in South Korea

Coordinates: 36°32′56.34″N 128°43′30.9″E

Andong Civic Stadium (Korean: 안동시민운동장) is a multi-purpose stadium located in Andong, South Korea. It was opened in 1979. Several K-League matches were played at Andong Stadium in 1983, 1984, 1986, 1990, 1995, 2001. It is used mostly for football matches and holds 17,500 people. It was renovated from October 1990 to May 1991.
