= Ha Jae-hoon (baseball) =

South Korean baseball player (born 1990)

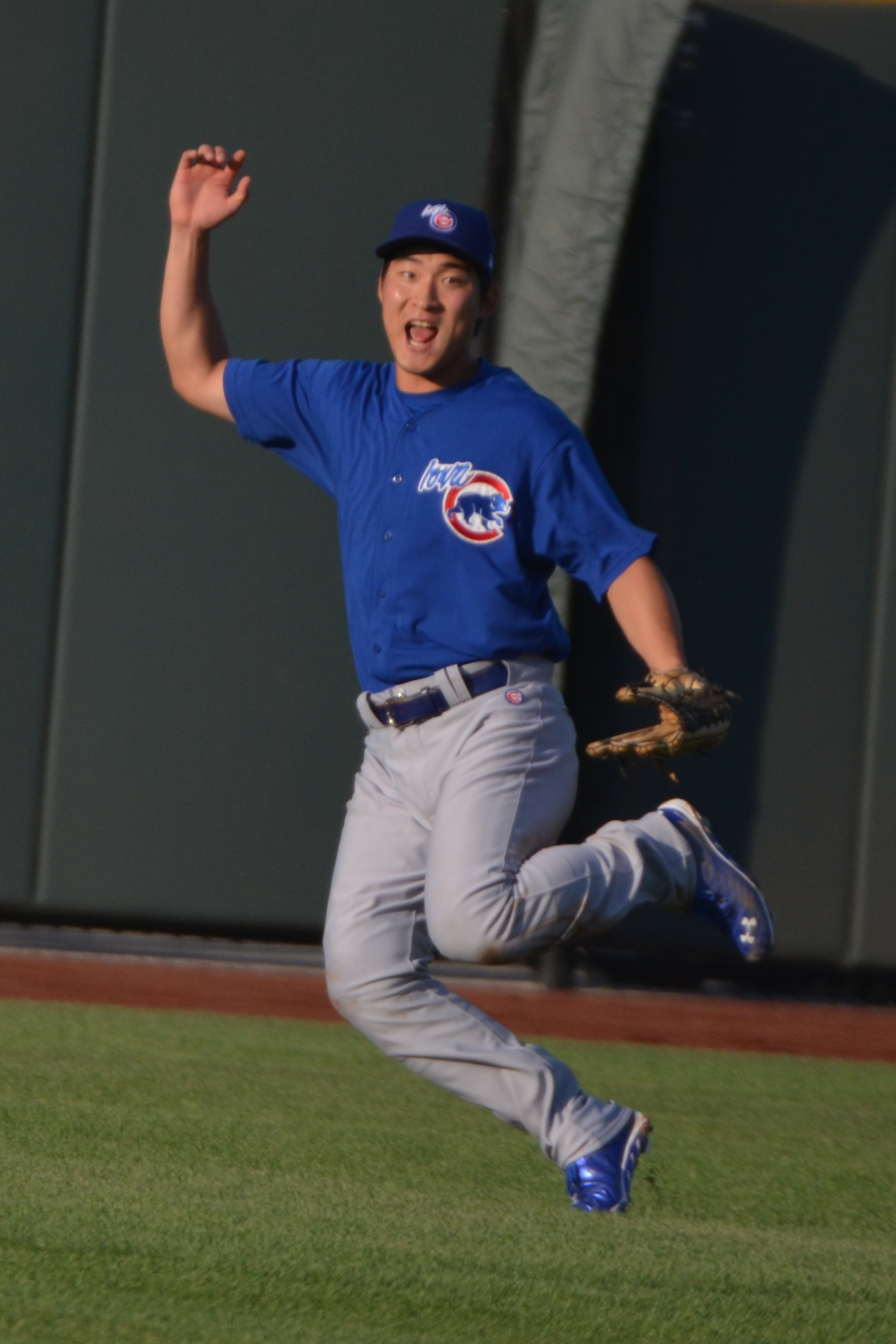
- Ha with the Iowa Cubs in 2013

SSG Landers – No. 13
- Outfielder / Pitcher
- Born: October 29, 1990 (age 36); Jinju, South Korea
- Bats: Right Throws: Right

Professional debut
- NPB: June 8, 2016, for the Tokyo Yakult Swallows
- KBO: March 23, 2019, for the SK Wyverns

NPB statistics (through 2016 season)
- Batting average: .225
- Home runs: 0
- Runs batted in: 2

KBO statistics (through 2025)
- Batting average: .251
- Home runs: 26
- Runs batted in: 92
- Win–loss record: 7–4
- Earned run average: 3.20
- Strikeouts: 82
- Stats at Baseball Reference

Teams
- Tokyo Yakult Swallows (2016); SK Wyverns / SSG Landers (2019–present)

Career highlights and awards
- Korean Series champion (2022); KBO saves leader (2019)

Ha Jae-Hoon (born October 29, 1990) is a South Korean professional baseball outfielder and pitcher for the SSG Landers of the KBO League. He was formerly an outfielder in Nippon Professional Baseball (NPB) for the Tokyo Yakult Swallows in 2016 but converted to pitching full-time when he joined the KBO.

== Career ==
=== Chicago Cubs ===
On June 17, 2009, Ha signed with the Chicago Cubs organization as an outfielder. He made his professional debut with the Low-A Boise Hawks, hitting .242 in 65 games. Ha spent 2010 with the Single-A Peoria Chiefs, playing in 77 games and batting .317/.334/.468 with seven home runs, 46 RBI, and nine stolen bases. He split 2011 between the High-A Daytona Cubs and Double-A Tennessee Smokies. In 132 games split between the two affiliates, Ha slashed .279/.315/.414 with 11 home runs, 72 RBI, and 13 stolen bases.

Ha spent the entire 2012 season with Tennessee, playing in 121 games and hitting .273/.352/.385 with six home runs, 47 RBI, and 11 stolen bases. He played in the All-Star Futures Game, homering off Gerrit Cole. Ha split the 2013 campaign between Tennessee and the Triple-A Iowa Cubs. In 90 games split between the two affiliates, he slashed .254/.318/.365 with six home runs, 35 RBI, and 15 stolen bases.

Ha returned to Tennessee and Iowa in 2014. In 125 combined appearances, he accumulated a .229/.274/.310 batting line with six home runs, 51 RBI, and five stolen bases. Ha converted into a pitcher prior to the 2015 season. In 16 relief appearances for the Low-A Eugene Emeralds, he compiled a 3–0 record, 2.33 ERA, and 29 strikeouts across 27 innings pitched. Ha elected free agency following the season on November 6, 2015.

=== Tokyo Yakult Swallows ===
Ha began the 2016 season playing for the Tokushima Indigo Socks of the independent Shikoku Island League Plus. On May 26, 2016, Ha signed with the Tokyo Yakult Swallows of Nippon Professional Baseball. He played in 17 games for the club, batting .225/.262/.275 with no home runs and two RBI. He spent the 2017 and 2018 seasons playing in an independent league in Japan.

=== SK Wyverns / SSG Landers ===
Prior to the 2019 season, Ha signed with the SK Wyverns of the KBO League. Ha took on the role of closer for the Wyverns and posted a 5-3 record and 1.98 ERA with 64 strikeouts and a league-leading 36 saves across 61 appearances. He made 15 appearances for the club in 2020 due to shoulder troubles, and struggled to a 7.62 ERA with 10 strikeouts and 4 saves across 13 innings of work.
