= Korea Football Association =

Governing body of association football in South Korea

AFC
- Founded: 19 September 1933; 93 years ago
- Headquarters: Cheonan, Chungnam
- FIFA affiliation: 21 May 1948; 78 years ago
- AFC affiliation: 21 May 1954; 72 years ago
- EAFF affiliation: 28 May 2002; 24 years ago
- President: Vacant
- Vice-President: Lee Yong-soo; Shin Jeong-sik; Kim Byung-ji
- Website: kfa.or.kr

- Korea Football Association
- Hangul: 대한축구협회
- Hanja: 大韓蹴球協會
- RR: Daehan chukgu hyeophoe
- MR: Taehan ch'ukku hyŏphoe

The Korea Football Association (KFA, Korean: 대한축구협회) is the governing body of football and futsal within South Korea. It sanctions professional, semi-professional and amateur football in South Korea. Founded in 1933, the governing body became affiliated with FIFA fifteen years later in 1948, and the Asian Football Confederation in 1954.

== History ==
In 1921, the first All Joseon Football Tournament was held, and in 1933, the Korea Football Association was organized (following the foundation of Joseon Referees' Association in 1928), which created a foundation to disseminate and develop the sport. Park Seung-bin was the first president of the KFA, charged with the task of promoting and spreading organised football in Korea.

The Korea Football Association was reinstated in 1948, following the establishment of the Republic of Korea. The KFA became a member of FIFA, the international football governing body that same year. It later joined the AFC (Asian Football Confederation) in 1954.

== Members ==
As of 6 July 2026

- President: Vacant
- Vice-presidents: Lee Yong-soo, Shin Jeong-sik, Kim Byung-ji
- Executive director: Kim Seung-hee
- General secretary: Jeon Han-jin
- Heads of departments

Fairness: So Jin
International: Jeon Han-jin
Technical: Vacant
Competition: Kim Hyun-tae
Communication: Wi Won-seok
Referee: Moon Jin-hee
Ethics: Kim Yoon-ju
Medical: Kim Gwang-jun
Development: Hyun Young-min

- Administrative inspector: Jeong Tae-seok, Lee Tae-ho

== Presidents ==
Shin Ki-jun was the president of the Joseon Referees' Association, but he is not officially recognized as the first president.

No.	President	Year
1	Park Seung-bin	1933–1934
2	Lyuh Woon-hyung	1934–1938
3	Ko Won-hoon	1938–1942
4	Ko Won-hoon (2)	1942–1945
5	Ha Kyung-deok	1945–1947
6	Ha Kyung-deok (2)	1947–1948
7	Shin Ik-hee	1948–1949
8	Hong Sung-ha	1949
9	Yun Bo-seon	1949–1950
10	Hong Sung-ha (2)	1950–1952
11	Hong Sung-ha (3)	1952
12	Chang Taek-sang	1952–1954
13	Lee Jong-lim	1954–1955
14	Hyun Jung-ju	1955
15	Kim Myung-hak	1955–1956
16	Kim Myung-hak (2)	1956–1957
17	Kim Yoon-ki	1957–1959
18	Kim Yoon-ki (2)	1959–1960
19	Jang Ki-young	1960
20	Jung Moon-ki	1960–1961

No.	President	Year
21	Jang Ki-young (2)	1961–1962
22	Kim Yoon-ki (3)	1962
23	Jang Ki-young (3)	1962–1963
24	Hwang Yeop	1963
25	Kim Yoon-ki (4)	1963–1964
26	Min Kwan-sik	1964
27	Choi Chi-hwan	1964–1967
28	Choi Chi-hwan (2)	1967–1968
29	Choi Chi-hwan (3)	1968–1969
30	Choi Chi-hwan (4)	1969–1970
31	Jang Deok-jin	1970–1972
32	Jang Deok-jin (2)	1972–1973
33	Ko Tae-jin	1973–1975
34	Ko Tae-jin (2)	1975
35	Kim Yoon-ha	1975–1977
36	Kim Yoon-ha (2)	1977–1978
37	Kim Yoon-ha (3)	1978
38	Park Joon-hong	1978–1979
39	Choi Soon-Young	1979–1980
40	Choi Soon-Young (2)	1980–1983

No.	President	Year
41	Choi Soon-Young (3)	1983–1985
42	Choi Soon-Young (4)	1985–1986
43	Choi Soon-Young (5)	1986–1987
44	Lee Jong-hwan	1987–1988
45	Kim Woo-choong	1988–1989
46	Kim Woo-choong (2)	1989–1993
47	Chung Mong-joon	1993–1997
48	Chung Mong-joon (2)	1997–2001
49	Chung Mong-joon (3)	2001–2005
50	Chung Mong-joon (4)	2005–2009
51	Cho Chung-yun	2009–2013
52	Chung Mong-gyu	2013–2017
53	Chung Mong-gyu (2)	2017–2021
54	Chung Mong-gyu (3)	2021–2025
55	Chung Mong-gyu (4)	2025–2026 (Note: Had been elected to a fourth consecutive term, which was scheduled to run until 2029, but resigned on 6 July 2026.)

== National teams ==
=== Men's teams ===
- South Korea national football B team (student)
- South Korea national under-23 football team
- South Korea national under-20 football team
- South Korea national under-17 football team
- South Korea national football team
- South Korea national futsal team

=== Women's teams ===
- South Korea women's national under-20 football team
- South Korea women's national under-17 football team
- South Korea women's national football team

=== Defunct team ===
- South Korea national beach soccer team

== Competitions ==
As of 2025

=== Current competitions ===
The K League, a professional league founded by the KFA in 1983, has been held by its independent association since July 1994.

Competition	Note	Current champions	Next season
Korea Cup (domestic)	National cup held since 1996.	Jeonbuk Hyundai Motors (2025)	2026–27 Korea Cup
K3 League	Men's semi-professional league held since 2020.	Gimhae FC (2025)	2026 K3 League
K4 League	Men's semi-professional league held since 2020.	Dangjin Citizen (2025)	2026 K4 League
WK League	Women's semi-professional league held since 2009.	Hwacheon KSPO (2025)	2026 WK League
U-League	Universities' league held since 2008.	Dankook University (2025)	2026 U-League

=== Defunct competitions ===
- All Joseon Football Tournament: National cup held from 1938 to 1940. (Editions from 1921 to 1937 were held by Joseon Sports Council.)
- Korean National Football Championship: National cup held from 1946 to 2000.
- Korean President's Cup: Cup competition contested between semi-professional and amateur clubs from 1952 to 2009.
- Korea Cup (international): International competition annually held from 1971 to 1999.

== Awards ==
=== Current awards ===
- Player of the Year
- Young Player of the Year
- Coach of the Year
- Goal of the Year
- Referee of the Year
- Club of the Year

=== Defunct awards ===
- Best XI
- Hall of Fame

== Controversies ==
=== 1992: B team's participation in Asian Cup qualifiers ===
In May 1992, the KFA decided to send their B team, which consisted of university players and semi-professional players to the 1992 AFC Asian Cup qualifiers in order to avoid disrupting the K League, causing controversy. The next month, South Korea failed to qualify for the 1992 AFC Asian Cup after losing 2–1 to Thailand. In September, president Kim Woo-choong announced his resignation five months beforehand ahead of the end of his tenure after the failure brought by executives including Shin Moon-sun, Lee Yong-soo and Huh Seung-pyo.

=== 2023: Attempted match-fixing pardons ===
On 28 March 2023, the KFA suddenly announced that they would pardon 100 current and former players, coaches, and referees, including 48 who were banned from Korean football after the 2011 match-fixing scandal. The decision was reportedly made in order to celebrate the national team reaching the round of 16 in the 2022 World Cup, which triggered an uproar from fans and journalists before the decision was reversed a few days later. The backlash resulted in the entire KFA board resigning, which included Lee Dong-gook, Lee Young-pyo and Cho Won-hee.

=== 2024: Reappointment of Hong Myung-bo ===
After Jürgen Klinsmann was sacked following the 2023 AFC Asian Cup, the men's national team cycled through two interim managers from February to July 2024. The head of the selection committee, Jung Hae-seong abruptly resigned just days before Ulsan HD manager Hong Myung-bo was reappointed as the manager heading into the 2026 FIFA World Cup. Hong's return sparked major controversy over the selection process and his previous tenure with the national team, which ended in South Korea exiting the 2014 World Cup without a single win. Furthermore, the announcement came in the middle of the K League season, prompting irate Ulsan fans to hold up banners saying "Get out!" directed at Hong while protesting in front of the KFA's headquarters.

The KFA threatened legal action against selection committee member and commentator Park Joo-ho over a video he uploaded on his YouTube channel on 8 July. In the middle of filming with fellow commentator Kim Hwan over the KFA's stalled managerial search, they learned of Hong's reappointment with their reactions being captured in real-time. Park goes on to reveal having no knowledge of the decision despite being part of the committee and shared his frustration with the disorganized process. His reaction was part of the full video uploaded later, garnering several million views. Park refused to retract his claims of cronyism and dysfunction within the KFA leadership, with Koo Ja-cheol among several players who publicly defended Park on social media. Hong's 2002 World Cup teammates Kim Nam-il and Ahn Jung-hwan, also corroborated Park's claims and revealed the issues have plagued the KFA since 2002.

After the revelations and public outcry, the KFA decided not to pursue legal action against Park, but the incident led to the Ministry of Culture, Sports and Tourism (MCST) conducting an independent probe by the Sports Ethics Center. Park resigned from his position and joined commentator Park Moon-sung in testifying before an inquiry at the National Assembly that September. It was reported that the KFA had shortlisted three candidates for the national team job: Gus Poyet, David Wagner, and Jesse Marsch, the latter later being hired by the Canadian national team. Jung's sudden resignation stalled the coaching search, leaving technical director Lee Im-saeng, despite not being part of the committee, interviewing Poyet and Wagner himself in Spain and Germany respectively, with Wagner going as far to preparing a 50-page report ranging from potential prospects to tactics for the upcoming World Cup. After returning from Europe, Lee went straight to Hong's residence and negotiated for his return and appointment, completely bypassing the KFA's own procedures. Both Poyet and Wagner did not learn of Hong's hiring until after the KFA made the announcement.

Public opinion of the KFA deteriorated further following revelations that the organization issued delayed responses to or failed to advocate for Korean players playing in European leagues over racist abuse, with commentators noting the stark contrast between that and their response to Park's YouTube video. Later that year, the MCST said that the KFA breached its own rules while hiring Jürgen Klinsmann and Hong Myung-bo, but found no evidence of illegal conduct.

=== 2026: Corruption investigation ===
Following South Korea's disastrous exit in the 2026 World Cup, South Korean president Lee Jae Myung called for an investigation into the KFA, citing the significant amount of taxpayer money allocated to Korean football. Hong resigned from the national team after but not before walking into Incheon Airport at 4 am local time, greeted by protests and jeers from angry fans. Chung also resigned after the tournament and was heckled by disgruntled fans at the airport.

On 6 August 2026, JTBC News reported that during the 2012 Summer Olympics and the 2014 World Cup qualifiers, the KFA allegedly used corporate credit cards to pay hundreds of thousands of won on massage-parlor services for foreign referees, including expenses involving sexual services. At the time, prosecutors dismissed the case without charges due to insufficient evidence. It was also reported that the services provided was customary practice.

== See also ==
- South Korea national football team
- K League
- Football in South Korea
- Women's football in South Korea
