= Ha Jae-hoon (footballer, born 1965) =

South Korean footballer

Ha Jae-Hoon
Personal information
- Full name: Ha Jae-Hoon
- Date of birth: August 15, 1965 (age 61)
- Place of birth: South Korea
- Height: 1.74 m (5 ft 9 in)
- Position: Defender

Senior career*
Years	Team	Apps	(Gls)
1987–1994	Yukong Elephants	127	(5)

Managerial career
- 2003: Bucheon SK
- 2008–2012: Cheonan City FC
- * Club domestic league appearances and goals as of December 2, 2008 ‡ National team caps and goals as of December 2, 2008

Ha Jae-Hoon (Korean: 하재훈, born on February 10, 1965) is a former South Korea football player and coach.

As a player, he won the K-League 1989 with Yukong Elephants. He was manager of Bucheon SK and Cheonan City FC.

== Honours ==
Yukong Elephants

- K League: 1989
