= Jeju SK FC =

South Korean football club

Jeju SK
- Full name: Jeju SK Football Club 제주SK축구단
- Founded: 1982; 44 years ago (as Yukong FC)
- Ground: Jeju World Cup Stadium
- Capacity: 29,791
- Owner: SK Energy
- Chairman: Koo Chang-yong
- Head coach: Sérgio Costa
- League: K League 1
- 2025: K League 1, 11th of 12
- Website: www.jejuskfc.com
| Home colours | Away colours |

Jeju SK FC (Korean: 제주 SK FC) is a South Korean professional football club based in Jeju Province that competes in the K League 1, the top division of the South Korean football league system. In the past, the club has been known as the Yukong Elephants, Bucheon SK, and Jeju United.

== History ==
The club was founded on 17 December 1982 as Yukong FC, becoming the second professional football club to be established in South Korea. The club's mascot was an elephant and the team became known as the Yukong Elephants. It was owned and financially supported by the Sunkyoung Group's subsidiary, Yukong (currently SK Group's "SK Energy"), along with Seoul, Incheon, and Gyeonggi as its franchise. Yukong FC was a founding member of the Korean Super League, South Korea's first professional football league and forerunner to the K League. Yukong Elephants won the league championship on only one occasion, in 1989.

When the Super League was established there was no home and away system, but following its implementation in 1987, Yukong FC was initially based within the Seoul Metropolitan Area. From 1990, the club shared Dongdaemun Stadium in Seoul with Ilhwa Chunma and LG Cheetahs. In 1992, the three clubs even allowed spectators to use their club memberships to watch each other's home matches.

As part of the K League's decentralization policy, in 1995 the Seoul government gave an eviction order to the three clubs based in Seoul (Yukong Elephants, LG Cheetahs and Ilhwa Chunma). However, they guaranteed that if clubs built a football-specific stadium in Seoul, they could have a Seoul franchise and return to Seoul. As a result, the three clubs were forced to move their home base from Seoul to other cities.

In 1996, Yukong moved to the city of Bucheon, a satellite city of Seoul. Mid-way through the 1997 season, the club re-branded itself as Bucheon SK. Because the city of Bucheon lacked a stadium, they used the Mokdong Stadium in Seoul until 2000. At the start of the 2001 season, the team moved to the 35,545-capacity Bucheon Leports Complex. In February 2006, Bucheon SK announced their move to Jeju without any fore notice, and renamed as Jeju United FC.

On 3 November 2007, head coach Jung Hae-seong announced his resignation after accepting the position of assistant coach for the South Korea national team. The club stated that they intended to appoint a foreign manager as his replacement. In January 2008, Artur Jorge was appointed as the new head coach. Artur's emphasis on passing play and entertaining football was well received by fans; however, the team finished 10th in the 2008 K League season and remained in the lower mid-table throughout the 2009 K League season. As a result, on 14 October 2009, he announced his resignation before the end of the season, and assistant coach Cho Jin-ho took over as interim manager. He was replaced shortly afterwards by former under-17 national team coach Park Kyung-hoon.

The club finished as runners-up in the 2010 season, allowing them to enter the 2011 AFC Champions League, where they were eliminated in the group stage. The club further qualified for the competition in its 2017 and 2018 editions, making it to the knockout stage in the former before being narrowly knocked out by eventual champions Urawa Red Diamonds in a match where three Jeju players were controversially sent off.

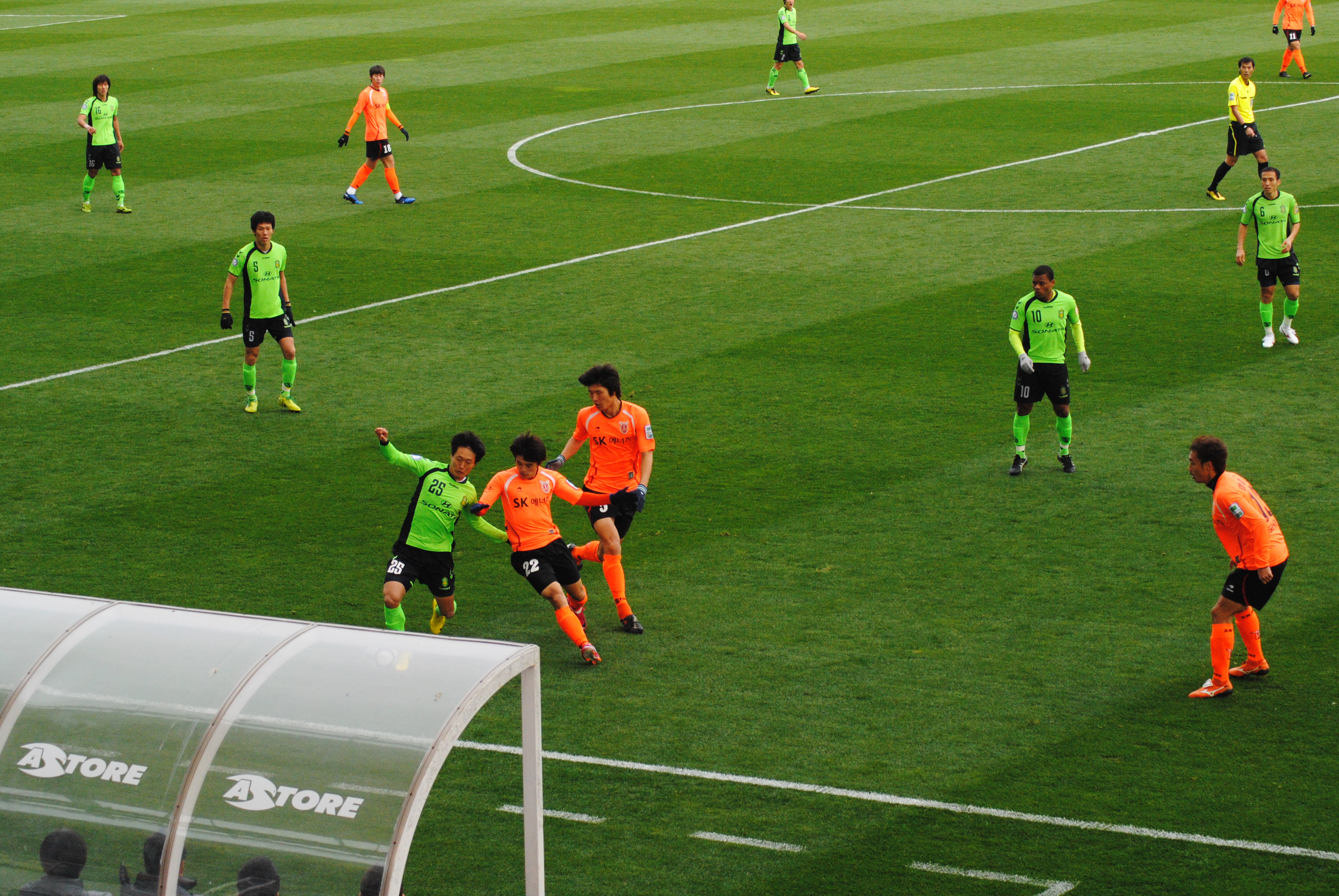
Jeju, runners-up of the 2010 season, face off against rivals Jeonbuk

At the beginning of the 2019 season, the team struggled with poor performances. As a result, they parted ways with head coach Jo Sung-hwan, who had led the team for nearly five years, and appointed Choi Yun-kyum as his successor. During the mid-season, the club attempted to turn things around by signing new players such as Yun Il-lok and Choi Kyu-baek, while Yoon Bit-garam returned to the team after completing his military service. However, despite these efforts, the team finished at the bottom of the league standings and was relegated to the second division for the first time since its establishment.

The club received promotion back to the top flight the following year by finishing first in the 2020 K League 2 season.

In 2025, the club rebranded as Jeju SK FC, reflecting a stronger commitment from the parent company SK Group.

=== Franchise relocation history ===
| Club name | City / Area | Period |
|---|---|---|
| Yukong Elephants | Seoul, Incheon, Gyeonggi | 1983 (Note: Between 1983 and 1986, K League didn't have a home and away system.) |
| Yukong Elephants | Seoul | 1984–1986 |
| Yukong Elephants | Incheon, Gyeonggi | 1987–1990 |
| Yukong Elephants | Seoul – Dongdaemun Stadium | 1991–1995 |
| Bucheon Yukong; Bucheon SK | Seoul – Mokdong Stadium (Note: Bucheon SK held all home matches at Mokdong Stadium in Seoul until 2000, because Bucheon Stadium was under construction.) | 1996 |
| Bucheon SK | Bucheon – Bucheon Stadium | 1997–2005 |
| Jeju United | Jeju – Jeju World Cup Stadium | 2006–2024 |
| Jeju SK | Jeju – Jeju World Cup Stadium | 2025–present |

== Stadiums and facilities ==
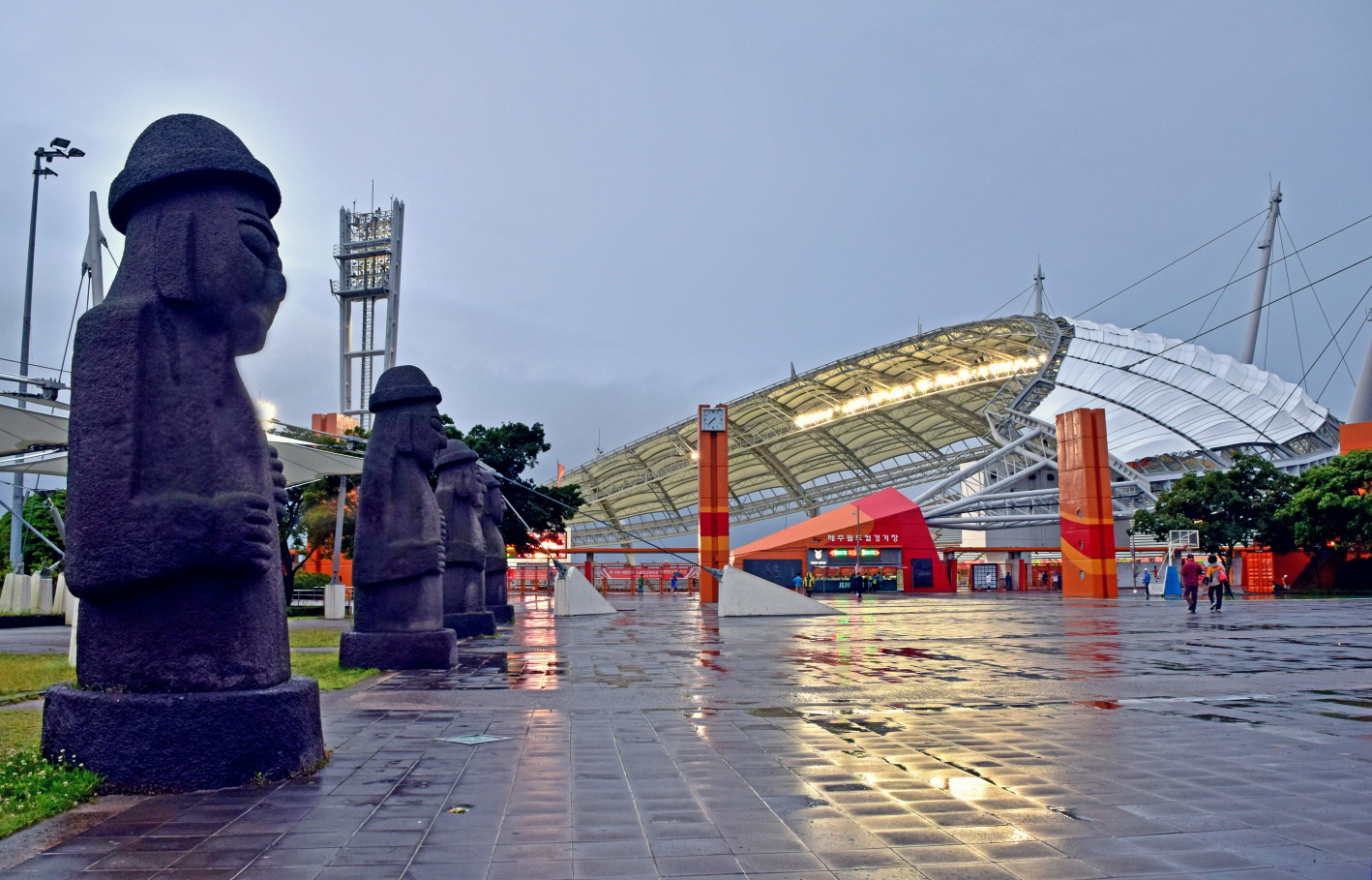
View from the outside of Jeju World Cup Stadium

Jeju SK play their home games at the 29,791 capacity Jeju World Cup Stadium in Seogwipo, the second largest city on Jeju Island. The club previously played at Mokdong Stadium in Seoul and Bucheon Stadium in Bucheon.

The club's training ground, the Jeju SK FC Club House, is also located in Seogwipo.

== Club culture ==
Jeju's mascots include Gam Gyuri, Hallahalbang, and Baeknogi. Among them, Gam Gyuri is the most representative mascot and is known for its strong sense of responsibility, leading the Gam Gyuri family and Jeju SK.

The club's supporters' group is called Pungbaek (풍백).

== Players ==
=== Current squad ===
As of 12 October 2026

Note: Flags indicate national team as defined under FIFA eligibility rules; some limited exceptions apply. Players may hold more than one non-FIFA nationality.

| No. | Pos. | Nation | Player |
|---|---|---|---|
| 1 | GK | KOR | Kim Dong-jun |
| 2 | DF | POR | Tobias Figueiredo |
| 3 | DF | FRA | Julien Célestine |
| 4 | DF | KOR | Heo Kang-jun |
| 5 | MF | BRA | Italo |
| 6 | DF | KOR | Kwon Gi-min |
| 7 | FW | KOR | Park Chang-jun |
| 8 | MF | KOR | Lee Chang-min (captain) |
| 9 | FW | BRA | Matheus Aiás |
| 10 | FW | KOR | Lee Kun-hee |
| 11 | FW | KOR | Shin Sang-eun |
| 13 | DF | KOR | Chung Woon (vice-captain) |
| 17 | DF | KOR | Yu In-soo |
| 18 | FW | KOR | Kim Sin-jin |
| 22 | FW | ALB | Eraldo Çinari |

| No. | Pos. | Nation | Player |
|---|---|---|---|
| 23 | DF | KOR | Rim Chang-woo |
| 24 | FW | KOR | Choi Byeong-wook |
| 30 | MF | KOR | Gu Bon-seo |
| 31 | GK | KOR | Joo Seung-min |
| 33 | MF | KOR | Park Soo-bin |
| 39 | MF | KOR | Kim Jae-min |
| 40 | DF | KOR | Kim Ryun-seong (vice-captain) |
| 41 | DF | KOR | Kim Jae-woo |
| 47 | DF | KOR | Park Min-jae |
| 55 | MF | KOR | Kang Dong-hwi |
| 71 | DF | KOR | Kim Tae-hwan |
| 81 | GK | KOR | Heo Ja-woong |
| 88 | DF | KOR | Jo In-jung |
| 94 | FW | BRA | Emerson Negueba |

=== Out on loan ===
Note: Flags indicate national team as defined under FIFA eligibility rules; some limited exceptions apply. Players may hold more than one non-FIFA nationality.

| No. | Pos. | Nation | Player |
|---|---|---|---|
| — | GK | KOR | An Chan-gi (at Gimcheon Sangmu for military service) |
| — | GK | KOR | Heo Jae-won (at Bayern Munich U19) |
| — | DF | KOR | Jang Min-gyu (at Gimcheon Sangmu for military service) |
| — | DF | KOR | Kim Jee-woon (at Jinju Citizen) |

| No. | Pos. | Nation | Player |
|---|---|---|---|
| — | MF | KOR | Kim Jun-ha (at Gimcheon Sangmu for military service) |
| — | MF | KOR | Oh Jae-hyeok (at Gimcheon Sangmu for military service) |
| — | FW | LTU | Gytis Paulauskas (at Jeonbuk Hyundai Motors) |
| — | FW | KOR | Yoo Seung-jae (at Los Angeles FC 2) |

== Backroom staff ==
=== Coaching staff ===
- Head coach: (Portugal) Sérgio Costa
- Assistant coach: (South Korea) Jung Jo-gook
- Goalkeeping coach: (South Korea) Kim Geun-bae
- Coaches: (South Korea) Jo Jae-cheol
- Fitness coach: (Portugal) Francisco Calvete
- Analysis coach: (Portugal) Nuno Ferreira

=== Support staff ===
- Rehabilitation trainers: (South Korea) Yoon Jae-young, (South Korea) Park Sun-ho, (South Korea) Ha Tae-jun
- Team manager: (South Korea) Kim Dong-geon
- Kit manager: (South Korea) Moon Seong-jun
- Interpreter: (South Korea) Moon Jun-ho
- Head driver: (South Korea) Oh Kyung-myung

Source: Official website

== Honours ==
- K League 1
  - Winners (1): 1989
  - Runners-up (5): 1984, 1994, 2000, 2010, 2017
- K League 2
  - Winners (1): 2020
- Korean FA Cup
  - Runners-up (1): 2004
- Korean League Cup
  - Winners (3): 1994, 1996, 2000s
  - Runners-up (2): 1998, 1998s

== Season-by-season records ==
=== Domestic record ===
| Season | Division | Tms. | Pos. | Korea Cup |
|---|---|---|---|---|
| 1983 | 1 | 5 | 3 | — |
| 1984 | 1 | 8 | 2 | — |
| 1985 | 1 | 8 | 5 | — |
| 1986 | 1 | 6 | 4 | — |
| 1987 | 1 | 5 | 3 | — |
| 1988 | 1 | 5 | 3 | — |
| 1989 | 1 | 6 | 1 | — |
| 1990 | 1 | 6 | 4 | — |
| 1991 | 1 | 6 | 4 | — |
| 1992 | 1 | 6 | 6 | — |
| 1993 | 1 | 6 | 5 | — |
| 1994 | 1 | 7 | 2 | — |
| 1995 | 1 | 8 | 4 | — |
| 1996 | 1 | 9 | 4 | Semi-final |
| 1997 | 1 | 10 | 10 | Quarter-final |
| 1998 | 1 | 10 | 7 | Round of 16 |
| 1999 | 1 | 10 | 3 | Quarter-final |
| 2000 | 1 | 10 | 2 | Semi-final |
| 2001 | 1 | 10 | 7 | Round of 16 |
| 2002 | 1 | 10 | 8 | Round of 16 |
| 2003 | 1 | 12 | 12 | Semi-final |
| 2004 | 1 | 13 | 13 | Runners-up |
| 2005 | 1 | 13 | 5 | Round of 16 |
| 2006 | 1 | 14 | 13 | Round of 32 |
| 2007 | 1 | 14 | 11 | Semi-final |
| 2008 | 1 | 14 | 10 | Round of 32 |
| 2009 | 1 | 15 | 14 | Quarter-final |
| 2010 | 1 | 15 | 2 | Semi-final |
| 2011 | 1 | 16 | 9 | Round of 16 |
| 2012 | 1 | 16 | 6 | Semi-final |
| 2013 | 1 | 14 | 9 | Semi-final |
| 2014 | 1 | 12 | 5 | Round of 32 |
| 2015 | 1 | 12 | 6 | Quarter-final |
| 2016 | 1 | 12 | 3 | Round of 32 |
| 2017 | 1 | 12 | 2 | Round of 16 |
| 2018 | 1 | 12 | 5 | Quarter-final |
| 2019 | 1 | 12 | 12 | Round of 16 |
| 2020 | 2 | 10 | 1 | Round of 16 |
| 2021 | 1 | 12 | 4 | Third round |
| 2022 | 1 | 12 | 5 | Round of 16 |
| 2023 | 1 | 12 | 9 | Semi-final |
| 2024 | 1 | 12 | 7 | Semi-final |
| 2025 | 1 | 12 | 11 | Third round |

=== AFC Champions League record ===
All results (home and away) list Jeju's goal tally first.

| Season | Round | Opposition | Home | Away | Agg. |
|---|---|---|---|---|---|
| 2011 | Group E | (China) Tianjin TEDA | 0–1 | 0–3 | 3rd |
| 2011 | Group E | (Australia) Melbourne Victory | 1–1 | 2–1 | 3rd |
| 2011 | Group E | (Japan) Gamba Osaka | 2–1 | 1–3 | 3rd |
| 2017 | Group H | (China) Jiangsu Suning | 0–1 | 2–1 | 2nd |
| 2017 | Group H | (Japan) Gamba Osaka | 2–0 | 4–1 | 2nd |
| 2017 | Group H | (Australia) Adelaide United | 1–3 | 3–3 | 2nd |
| 2017 | Round of 16 | (Japan) Urawa Red Diamonds | 2–0 | 0–3 (a.e.t.) | 2–3 |
| 2018 | Group G | (China) Guangzhou Evergrande | 0–2 | 3–5 | 4th |
| 2018 | Group G | (Japan) Cerezo Osaka | 0–1 | 1–2 | 4th |
| 2018 | Group G | (Thailand) Buriram United | 0–1 | 2–0 | 4th |

== Managerial history ==
| No. | Name | Start | End | Season(s) |
|---|---|---|---|---|
| 1 | (South Korea) Lee Jong-hwan | 1982/04/20 | 1985/07/21 | 1983–1985 |
| 2 | (South Korea) Kim Jung-nam | 1985/07/21 | 1992/05/12 | 1985–1992 |
| C | (South Korea) Park Young-hwan | 1986/??/?? | 1986/??/?? | 1986 |
| C | (South Korea) Choi Jong-duk | 1988/07/13 | 1988/09/14 | 1988 |
| C | (South Korea) Park Sung-hwa (South Korea) Ham Heung-chul | 1992/05/12 | 1992/12/19 | 1992 |
| 3 | (South Korea) Park Sung-hwa | 1992/12/20 | 1994/10/29 | 1993–1994 |
| C | (South Korea) Cho Yoon-hwan | 1994/10/30 | 1994/12/31 | 1994 |
| 4 | (Russia) Valeri Nepomniachi | 1995/01/01 | 1998/10/31 | 1995–1998 |
| C | (South Korea) Cho Yoon-hwan | 1998/11/01 | 1998/12/31 | 1998 |
| 5 | (South Korea) Cho Yoon-hwan | 1999/01/01 | 2001/08/14 | 1999–2001 |
| C | (South Korea) Choi Yun-kyum | 2001/08/14 | 2001/08/31 | 2001 |
| 6 | (South Korea) Choi Yun-kyum | 2001/09/01 | 2002/09/01 | 2001–2002 |
| 7 | (Turkey) Tınaz Tırpan | 2002/09/02 | 2003/05/14 | 2002–2003 |
| C | (South Korea) Ha Jae-hoon | 2003/05/14 | 2003/07/18 | 2003 |
| 8 | (South Korea) Ha Jae-hoon | 2003/07/19 | 2003/12/31 | 2003 |
| 9 | (South Korea) Jung Hae-seong | 2004/01/01 | 2007/11/03 | 2004–2007 |
| 10 | (Brazil) Arthur Bernardes | 2008/01/04 | 2009/10/14 | 2008–2009 |
| C | (South Korea) Cho Jin-ho | 2009/10/14 | 2009/10/29 | 2009 |
| 11 | (South Korea) Park Kyung-hoon | 2009/10/30 | 2014/12/03 | 2010–2014 |
| 12 | (South Korea) Jo Sung-hwan | 2014/12/19 | 2016/10/14 | 2014–2016 |
| 13 | (South Korea) Kim In-soo | 2016/10/14 | 2016/12/15 | 2016 |
| 14 | (South Korea) Jo Sung-hwan | 2016/12/30 | 2019/05/02 | 2017–2019 |
| 15 | (South Korea) Choi Yun-kyum | 2019/05/03 | 2019/11/30 | 2019 |
| 16 | (South Korea) Nam Ki-il | 2019/12/26 | 2023/09/26 | 2020–2023 |
| C | (South Korea) Jung Jo-gook | 2023/09/26 | 2023/12/04 | 2023 |
| 17 | (South Korea) Kim Hak-bum | 2023/12/05 | 2025/09/27 | 2024–2025 |
| C | (South Korea) Kim Jung-soo | 2025/09/27 | 2025/12/24 | 2025 |
| 18 | (Portugal) Sérgio Costa | 2025/12/24 | present | 2026– |
